= 2026–27 East Bengal FC season =

Indian football club season

East Bengal
2026–27 season
- Owner: East Bengal Football Club
- Head coach: Antonio Lopez Habas
- Stadium: Salt Lake Stadium; East Bengal Ground
- ACL Two: Group stage
- Indian Super League: 5th
- Calcutta Football League: Runner-up
- Durand Cup: Champions
- IFA Shield: Runner-up
- Sikkim Gold Cup: Quarter-final
- Super Cup: pre-season
- Biggest win: 8–0 vs CISF Protectors (Durand Cup)
- Biggest defeat: 0–1 vs Mohun Bagan (Durand Cup)
Home colours	Away colours	Third colours
- All statistics correct as of 8 October 2026.

The 2026–27 season is the 107th season of East Bengal Football Club and their seventh season in the Indian Super League, and the thirty-first consecutive season in the top flight of Indian football. East Bengal are the defending champions of India, having won the 2025–26 Indian Super League and would represent India in the 2026–27 AFC Champions League Two.

== Background ==
East Bengal became champions of the 2025–26 Indian Super League, winning their fourth top tier national league title, ending a wait of twenty-two years. East Bengal thus qualified for the preliminary round of the 2026–27 AFC Champions League Two, marking the seventeenth appearance for club in continental stage, a record amongst Indian clubs. Apart from the Indian Super League championship, East Bengal had also finished runner-up of the 2025 IFA Shield and 2025–26 AIFF Super Cup.

However, right after the end of the season, Spanish head coach Oscar Bruzon announced his departure from the club after his contract expired, along with his coaching staff. East Bengal roped in another Spaniard, the three times Indian Super League champion – Antonio Lopez Habas as the head coach of the team for the season.

== Transfers ==
=== Incoming ===
Date	No.	Pos.	Name	Signed from	Fee	Ref
1 June 2026	88	DF	(India) Mark Zothanpuia	(India) Jamshedpur	Loan Return	
6 July 2026	1	GK	(India) Phurba Lachenpa	(India) Mumbai City	Free Transfer	
7 July 2026	17	DF	(India) Boris Singh Thangjam	(India) Goa	Free Transfer	
8 July 2026	34	DF	(India) Sandip Mandi	(India) Inter Kashi	Free Transfer	
8 July 2026	19	MF	(India) Rohit Kumar	(India) Odisha	Free Transfer	
9 July 2026	11	MF	(Spain) Dani Ramírez	(India) Punjab	Free Transfer	
9 July 2026	12	MF	(India) Danish Farooq	(India) Kerala Blasters	Free Transfer	
9 July 2026	3	DF	(India) Hardik Bhatt	(India) Mumbai City	Free Transfer	
10 July 2026	19	FW	(India) Rohit Danu	(India) Inter Kashi	Free Transfer	
14 July 2026	24	DF	(Spain) Nacho Monsalve	(Spain) Hércules	Free Transfer	
17 July 2026		FW	(Nigeria) Effiong Nsungusi	(India) Punjab	Free Transfer	
27 July 2026	8	FW	(Australia) Chris Ikonomidis	(Australia) Macarthur	Free Transfer	
27 July 2026	18	DF	(India) Narender Gahlot	(India) Inter Kashi	Free Transfer	
30 July 2026	36	MF	(India) Mohammed Asif Khan	(India) Inter Kashi	Free Transfer	
24 August 2026	21	DF	(Croatia) Diego Živulić	(Croatia) Rudeš	Free Transfer	
30 August 2026	20	MF	(India) Raynier Fernandes	(India) Jamshedpur	Free Transfer	
1 September 2026	90	FW	(Ivory Coast) Aké Arnaud Loba	(Libya) Al-Shomooa SC	Free Transfer	
17 September 2026	99	FW	(Poland) Łukasz Zwoliński	(Turkey) Sakaryaspor	Free Transfer	

=== Outgoing ===
Exit Date	No.	Pos.	Name	Signed to	Fee	Ref
1 June 2026	8	MF	(Brazil) Miguel Figueira	(India) Mohun Bagan SG	Released	
1 June 2026	9	FW	(Spain) Youssef Ezzejjari	(United Arab Emirates) Al Hamriyah	Released	
1 June 2026	17	MF	(India) Jerry Mawihmingthanga	(India) Sreenidi Deccan	Released	
1 June 2026	21	MF	(Spain) Saúl Crespo	(Spain) Ponferradina	Released	
1 June 2026	77	FW	(Denmark) Anton Søjberg	(Indonesia) Bhayangkara Presisi	Released	
1 June 2026	84	MF	(India) Sayan Banerjee	(India) Mohun Bagan SG	Released	
1 June 2026	11	FW	(India) Nandhakumar Sekar	(India) Odisha	Released	
1 June 2026	24	GK	(India) Debjit Majumder	(India) Forca Kochi	Released	
1 June 2026	3	DF	(India) Provat Lakra	(India) Jamshedpur	Released	
1 June 2026	6	DF	(Argentina) Kevin Sibille	(Indonesia) Bhayangkara Presisi	Released	
5 August 2026	88	MF	(India) Mark Zothanpuia	(India) Northeast United	Released	

== Team ==
=== First-team squad ===
The below list contains the names and details of the players registered for the first-team squad for East Bengal. This list does not include any reserve player who has never played in the first-team squad.

As of 20 November 2026

No.	Name	Nat.	Pos.	Date of Birth (Age)	Signed From	Signed In	Contact Ends	Apps	Goals	Assists
Goalkeepers
1	Phurba Lachenpa	(India)	GK	4 February 1998 (age 28)	(India) Mumbai City FC	2026	2028	7	0	0
13	Prabhsukhan Singh Gill	(India)	GK	2 January 2001 (age 25)	(India) Kerala Blasters	2023	2028	96	0	0
33	Karan Makkar	(India)	GK	20 March 2007 (age 19)	(India) Jamshedpur	2025	2027	0	0	0
95	Gourab Shaw	(India)	GK	4 May 2004 (age 22)	(India) Calcutta Port Trust	2023	2028	20	0	0
Defenders
3	Hardik Bhatt	(India)	RB	17 April 1997 (age 29)	(India) Mumbai City	2026	2029	14	1	2
4	Anwar Ali	(India)	CB	28 August 2000 (age 26)	(India) Delhi FC	2024	2029	57	7	2
5	Lalchungnunga	(India)	CB	25 December 2000 (age 25)	(India) Sreenidi Deccan	2022	2028	111	3	3
16	Martand Raina	(India)	CB	10 September 2000 (age 26)	(India) Rajasthan United	2025	2028	7	0	0
17	Boris Singh	(India)	RB	3 January 2000 (age 26)	(India) FC Goa	2026	2029	3	0	1
18	Narender Gahlot	(India)	CB	24 April 2001 (age 25)	(India) Inter Kashi	2026	2028	4	0	0
21	Diego Živulić	(Croatia)	CB	23 March 1992 (age 34)	(Croatia) Rudeš	2026	2027	10	0	0
24	Nacho Monsalve	(Spain)	CB	27 April 1994 (age 32)	(Spain) Hércules	2026	2027	2	0	0
27	Jay Gupta	(India)	LB	27 September 2001 (age 25)	(India) FC Goa	2025	2029	33	2	1
34	Sandip Mandi	(India)	LB	11 June 2002 (age 24)	(India) Inter Kashi	2026	2028	14	0	1
Midfielders
6	Rohit Kumar	(India)	CM	1 April 1997 (age 29)	(India) Odisha	2026	2028	13	2	1
7	Vishnu PV	(India)	LW	24 December 2001 (age 24)	(India) Muthoot	2023	2028	115	28	25
11	Dani Ramírez	(Spain)	AM	18 June 1992 (age 34)	(India) Punjab	2026	2027	17	5	7
12	Danish Farooq	(India)	CM	9 May 1996 (age 30)	(India) Kerala Blasters	2026	2028	0	0	0
15	Naorem Mahesh Singh	(India)	LW	1 March 1999 (age 27)	(India) Kerala Blasters	2022	2027	115	16	19
20	Raynier Fernandes	(India)	CM	19 February 1996 (age 30)	(India) East Bengal	2026	2027	2	0	0
23	Souvik Chakrabarti	(India)	CM	12 July 1991 (age 35)	(India) Hyderabad	2022	2027	92	1	2
25	Jeakson Singh	(India)	DM	21 June 2001 (age 25)	(India) Kerala Blasters	2024	2028	64	4	1
29	Bipin Singh	(India)	LW	10 March 1995 (age 31)	(India) Mumbai City	2025	2027	43	11	10
36	Mohammed Asif Khan	(India)	AM	9 March 2001 (age 25)	(India) Inter Kashi	2026	2028	6	0	0
74	Mohammed Rashid	(Palestine)	DM	3 July 1995 (age 31)	(Indonesia) Persebaya Surabaya	2025	2027	41	6	6
Forwards
8	Chris Ikonomidis	(Australia)	FW	4 May 1995 (age 31)	(Australia) Macarthur	2026	2028	8	1	4
	Effiong Nsungusi	(Nigeria)	FW	4 November 1999 (age 27)	(India) Punjab	2026	2027	0	0	0
10	Edmund Lalrindika	(India)	FW	24 April 1999 (age 27)	(India) Inter Kashi	2025	2027	46	9	6
14	David Lalhlansanga	(India)	FW	27 November 2001 (age 24)	(India) Mohammedan Sporting	2024	2027	66	20	6
19	Rohit Danu	(India)	FW	10 July 2002 (age 24)	(India) Inter Kashi	2026	2028	11	2	1
22	Jesin TK	(India)	FW	19 February 2000 (age 26)	(India) Kerala United	2022	2028	57	31	15
90	Aké Arnaud Loba	(Ivory Coast)	FW	1 April 1998 (age 28)	(Libya) Al-Shomooa	2026	2027	9	5	2
99	Łukasz Zwoliński	(Poland)	FW	24 February 1993 (age 33)	(Turkey) Sakaryaspor	2026	2027	6	2	0

=== New contracts ===
No.	Pos.	Date	Name	Ref.
13	GK	6 July 2026	(India) Prabhsukhan Singh Gill	
74	MF	7 July 2026	(Palestine) Mohammed Rashid	
5	DF	8 July 2026	(India) Lalchungnunga	
59	FW	8 July 2026	(India) Jesin TK	

=== Current technical staff ===
Position	Name
Head of Football	(India) Thangboi Singto
Head coach	(Spain) Antonio López Habas
Assistant coach	(Spain) Carlos Fonseca
Assistant coach	(India) Bino George
Goalkeeping Coach	(India) Subhasish Roy Chowdhury
Strength & Conditioning Coach	(Spain) Alejandro Sanchez-Buitrago
Head of Physiotherapist	(India) Dr. Firoz Shaikh
Assistant Physiotherapist	(India) Arghya Bose
Assistant Physiotherapist	(India) Tejas Lasalkar
Performance Analyst	(India) Aromal Vijayan
Team Manager	(India) Pratim Kumar Saha
Team Doctor	(India) Dr. Deepak Babu
Masseur	(India) Rajesh Basak
Masseur	(India) Robin Das
Masseur	(India) Raju Bose

== Competitions ==
=== Overall record ===
Competition	First match	Last match	Starting round	Final position	Record							
Competition	First match	Last match	Starting round	Final position	Pld	W	D	L	GF	GA	GD	Win %
AFC Champions League Two	12 August 2026	7 December 2026	Preliminary round	Group stage	5	1	2	2	8	8	+0	20.00
Durand Cup	25 July 2026	23 August 2026	Group stage	Winners	6	4	1	1	18	2	+16	66.67
IFA Shield	24 September 2026	8 October 2026	Group stage	Runners-up	4	2	0	2	10	5	+5	50.00
Indian Super League	18 October 2026		Round 1		4	2	1	1	14	8	+6	50.00
Super Cup					0	0	0	0	0	0	+0	—
Calcutta Football League (Note: East Bengal fielded mostly their Reserve team for the tournament, with Archisman Biswas taking charge as the head coach.)	12 July 2026	19 September 2026	Group League	Runners-up	14	9	5	0	35	8	+27	64.29
Sikkim Gold Cup (Note: East Bengal fielded their Reserve team for the tournament, with Archisman Biswas taking charge as the head coach.)	11 October 2026		Quarter-final	Quarter-final	1	0	0	1	1	2	−1	0.00
K. C. Paul Memorial Tournament	18 November 2026	22 November 2026	Quarter-final		2	2	0	0	9	2	+7	100.00
Total					36	20	9	7	95	35	+60	55.56

Last updated: 20 November 2026
Source: Soccerway

=== Durand Cup ===
East Bengal will participate in the 2026 Durand Cup and was grouped into Group A alongside Mohun Bagan Super Giant, South United and CISF Protectors and would play their group stage matches in Kolkata.

Group stage

Pos	Team	Pld	W	D	L	GF	GA	GD	Pts	Qualification	MBG	EAB	SOU	CIS
1	Mohun Bagan (H)	3	3	0	0	15	0	+15	9	knockout stage		1–0	8–0	6–0
2	East Bengal (H)	3	2	0	1	13	1	+12	6	knockout stage			5–0	8–0
3	South United	3	1	0	2	2	13	−11	3					2–0
4	CISF Protectors	3	0	0	3	0	16	−16	0					

Source: DFTS
Legend: Blue = home team win; Yellow = draw; Red = away team win.
Rules for classification: Group stage tiebreakers
(H) Hosts

Knockout stage

Quarter-finals
16 Aug – Ranchi
Delhi	5
Raengdai	1
16 Aug – Kolkata
East Bengal	1
Indian Army	0
17 Aug – Kolkata
Mohun Bagan (p)	1 (9)
Jamshedpur	1 (8)
17 Aug – Shillong
NorthEast United	5
Shillong Lajong	2

Semi-finals
19 Aug – Kolkata
Delhi	0 (3)
East Bengal (p)	0 (5)
20 Aug – Shillong
Mohun Bagan (p)	0 (4)
NorthEast United	0 (3)

Final
23 Aug – Kolkata
East Bengal	4
Mohun Bagan	1

==== Matches ====
Win Draw Loss Void

25 July 2026^{(KD)} Group stage	East Bengal	0–1	Mohun Bagan	Kolkata
17:00 IST	Lalrindika (yellow card) 45'	Report	Nassiri (yellow card) 36'; Samad 53'; Bose (yellow card) 74'	Stadium: Salt Lake Stadium; Attendance: 32,870; Referee: Lakshay; Man of the Match: Vishal Kaith (Mohun Bagan SG)

31 July 2026 Group stage	CISF Protectors	0–8	East Bengal	Kolkata
19:30 IST	Bebetto (yellow card) 28'	Report	Vishnu 38', 46', 76'; Mohammad Khalid 42' (o.g.); Jeakson 45+3'; Bipin 64'; Jesin 70', 73'	Stadium: Kishore Bharati Krirangan; Attendance: 4,360; Referee: Jehrul Islam; Man of the Match: Vishnu P.V. (East Bengal)

7 August 2026 Group stage	East Bengal	5–0	South United	Kolkata
19:00 IST	Ramírez 7'; Rashid 24'; Hardik 73'; Bipin 81'; Lalhlansanga 90+5'	Report	Noel S (yellow card) 38'	Stadium: Salt Lake Stadium; Attendance: 4,196; Referee: Lalit Singh Rawat; Man of the Match: Mohammed Rashid (East Bengal)

16 August 2026 Quarter finals	Indian Army	0–1	East Bengal	Kolkata
19:00 IST	Abhi S Biju (yellow card) 53'; Muhammed Shanoos P P (yellow card) 90+3'	Report	Vishnu 39'; Lalrindika (yellow card) 90+5'	Stadium: Salt Lake Stadium; Attendance: 6,251; Referee: Jehrul Islam; Man of the Match: Bhabindra Thakuri (Indian Army)

19 August 2026 Semi finals	Delhi	0–0 (3–5 p)	East Bengal	Kolkata
19:00 IST	Rodriguinho (penalty missed) 35'; Azhar (yellow card) 56'; Lamgoulen (yellow card) 58'; Nora (yellow card)	Report	Mandi (yellow card) 33'; Lalhlansanga (yellow card) 79'; Gill (yellow card)	Stadium: Salt Lake Stadium; Attendance: 7,687; Referee: Venkatesh Ramachadran; Man of the Match: Prabhsukhan Singh Gill (East Bengal)
	Penalties
	(penalty missed) Juan Peña; (penalty scored) Rodriguinho; (penalty scored) Viáfara; (penalty scored) Aimen		Ali (penalty scored); Danu (penalty scored); Lalchungnunga (penalty scored); Ikonomidis (penalty scored); Rashid (penalty scored)

23 August 2026^{(KD)} Final	East Bengal	4–1	Mohun Bagan	Kolkata
17:00 IST	Bipin 10'; Lalrindika 11', 22', 44'; Ramírez (yellow card) 29'; Jeakson (yellow card) 60'	Report	Manvir 33'; Bose (yellow card) 43'; Apuia (yellow card) 56'; Abhishek (yellow card) 59'; Alberto (yellow card) 90+5'	Stadium: Salt Lake Stadium; Attendance: 60,129; Referee: Aditya Purkayastha; Man of the Match: Edmund Lalrindika (East Bengal)

=== AFC Champions League Two ===
East Bengal qualified for the 2026–27 AFC Champions League Two preliminary round after becoming champions of the 2025–26 Indian Super League. East Bengal faced the runner-up of the 2025–26 Kuwaiti Premier League: Al-Arabi in the preliminary round match on 12 August 2026 as the Salt Lake Stadium in a single-legged playoff match and defeated the Kuwaiti side 4–1 in an historic win to secure their place in the AFC Champions League Two group stages. On 18 August, the draw for the group stage took place and East Bengal was drawn in Group D alongside – Al-Hussein of Jordan, Al-Shorta of Iraq and Al-Seeb of Oman.

On 16 September, East Bengal started their AFC Champions League Two group stage campaign against Jordanian champions Al-Hussein away at the Amman International Stadium in Amman, Jordan and drew 2–2 to earn the first point for any Indian club in the AFC Champions League Two tournament since its rebranding in 2024. On 13 October, East Bengal faced Al-Shorta at home at the Salt Lake Stadium and suffered a 2–3 defeat.

==== Matches ====
Win Draw Loss Void

12 August 2026 Preliminary round	East Bengal (India)	4–1 (a.e.t.)	(Kuwait) Al-Arabi	Kolkata
19:00 IST	Bhatt (yellow card) 65'; Mandi (yellow card) 74'; Gupta 90'; Rashid (yellow card) 90+2' (goal) 108'; Gill (yellow card) 113'; Lalhlansanga 117'; Danu 120'	AFC Report; GSA Report	Iwuala 76' (pen.); Majed (yellow card) 84'; Al-Mershed (yellow card) 85'	Stadium: Salt Lake Stadium; Attendance: 17,567; Referee: Sadullo Gulmurodi (Tajikistan)

==== Group Stage ====
Pos	Team	Pld	W	D	L	GF	GA	GD	Pts	Qualification	SHO	HUS	SEE	EBG
1	(Iraq) Al-Shorta (A)	4	3	1	0	8	3	+5	10	Advance to round of 16	—	1–1	1–0	–
2	(Jordan) Al-Hussein	4	1	2	1	6	6	0	5	Advance to round of 16	0–3	—	–	2–2
3	(Oman) Al-Seeb	4	1	1	2	2	4	−2	4		–	0–3	—	0–0
4	(India) East Bengal	4	0	2	2	4	7	−3	2		2–3	–	0–2	—

Updated to match(es) played on 3 November 2026. Source: ACL2
Rules for classification: Tiebreakers
(A) Advance to a further round

==== Matches ====
Win Draw Loss Void

16 September 2026 Group stage	Al-Hussein (Jordan)	2–2	(India) East Bengal	Amman, Jordan
21:30 IST	Al-Haj (yellow card) 49'; Al-Mardi 61'; Assaf 87'	AFC Report; GSA Report	Ramírez 9'; Ali 40'; Jeakson (yellow card) 77'	Stadium: Amman International Stadium; Attendance: 1,645; Referee: Ahmad Alaeddin (Lebanon); Man of the Match: Al-Mardi (Al Hussein)

13 October 2026 Group stage	East Bengal (India)	2–3	(Iraq) Al-Shorta	Kolkata, India
19:15 IST	Lalhlansanga 8', 40' (yellow card) 47'; Bhatt (yellow card) 69'	AFC Report; GSA Report	Yahya 14'; Al-Saedi 51'; Kuku 53'	Stadium: Salt Lake Stadium; Attendance: 12,765; Referee: Majed Al-Shamrani (Saudi Arabia)

27 October 2026 Group stage	Al-Seeb (Oman)	0–0	(India) East Bengal	Seeb, Oman
21:30 IST	Khamis (yellow card) 48'	AFC Report; GSA Report	Gupta (yellow card) 11'; Kumar (yellow card) 61'; Lalrindika (yellow card) 67'	Stadium: Al Seeb Stadium; Attendance: 1,120; Referee: Alex King (Australia)

3 November 2026 Group stage	East Bengal (India)	0–2	(Oman) Al-Seeb	Kolkata, India
19:15 IST	Jeakson (yellow card) 22'; Lalchungnunga (yellow card) 36'; Ramírez (yellow card) 90+2'	AFC Report; GSA Report	Oladapo (yellow card) 14'; Méyé 85'; Al-Aghbari 90+1'	Stadium: Salt Lake Stadium; Attendance: 11,735; Referee: Thoriq Alkatiri (Indonesia)

24 November 2026 Group stage	East Bengal (India)	–	(Jordan) Al-Hussein	Kolkata, India
19:15 IST		[ AFC Report] GSA Report		Stadium: Salt Lake Stadium

8 December 2026 Group stage	Al-Shorta (Iraq)	–	(India) East Bengal	Baghdad, Iraq
21:30 IST		[ AFC Report] GSA Report		Stadium: Al-Zawraa Stadium

=== IFA Shield ===
East Bengal will participate in the 2026 IFA Shield and has been grouped alongside Punjab and Mohammedan in Group A. Later, Mohammedan withdrew, and Calcutta Customs was taken as a replacement. East Bengal qualified for the semi finals and would face NorthEast United on 5 October at the Kishore Bharati Krirangan.

Group stage

Pos	Team	Pld	W	D	L	GF	GA	GD	Pts	Qualification	PFC	EAB	CCC
1	Punjab	2	2	0	0	8	0	+8	6	Advance to the Semi-Final		1–0	7–0
2	East Bengal (H)	2	1	0	1	3	2	+1	3	Advance to the Semi-Final			3–1
3	Calcutta Customs	2	0	0	2	1	10	−9	0				

Source: IFA
Legend: Blue = home team win; Yellow = draw; Red = away team win.
Rules for classification: Group stage tiebreakers
(H) Hosts

Semi-finals
4 October – Kishore Bharati
Mohun Bagan (p)	0 (4)
Punjab	0 (3)
5 October – Kishore Bharati
East Bengal	7
NorthEast United	2

Final
8 October – Yuba Bharati
Mohun Bagan	1
East Bengal	0

==== Matches ====
Win Draw Loss Void

24 September 2026 Group stage	Calcutta Customs	1–3	East Bengal	Kolkata
15:00 IST	Riki Gharami 12'; Monoranjan Singh (yellow card) 33'; Zacharie Mbenda (yellow card) 45+5'	Report; PDF Report	Kumar 29'; Danu 52'; Chakladar (yellow card) 72'; Akash Hemram 85'	Stadium: East Bengal Ground; Attendance: 3,509; Referee: Mithun Kumar Kundu; Man of the Match: Rohit Kumar (East Bengal)

30 September 2026 Group stage	Punjab	1–0	East Bengal	Kolkata
15:00 IST	Diego Raposo 41'; Prabhu (yellow card) 44' (yellow-red card) 90+2'; Arshdeep Singh (yellow card) 45+5'; Bouli (yellow card) 86'	Report; PDF Report		Stadium: East Bengal Ground; Attendance: 1,234; Referee: Pratik Mondal; Man of the Match: Diego Raposo (Punjab)

5 October 2026 Semi final	East Bengal	7–2	NorthEast United	Kolkata
17:00 IST	Lalhlansanga 11', 46', 56'; Kumar 23' (yellow card) 82'; Jeakson (yellow card) 42'; Ikonomidis 43'; Ramirez (yellow card) 52'; Loba 85'; Zwoliński 90+1'	Report; PDF Report	Ajaraie 2', 84'; Tlang (yellow card) 10'; Ninkovic (yellow card) 49'; Moyano (yellow card) 59'; Buanthanglun Samte (yellow card) 78' (yellow-red card) 90+6'	Stadium: Kishore Bharati Krirangan; Attendance: 4,523; Referee: Surojit Das; Man of the Match: David Lalhlansanga (East Bengal)

8 October 2026 Final^{(KD)}	East Bengal	0–1	Mohun Bagan SG	Kolkata
18:30 IST	Mandi (yellow card) 58'; Jeakson (yellow card) 75'	Report; PDF Report	Chhangte (yellow card) 20'; Zeljković 45'; Alberto (yellow card) 82'; Kaith (yellow card) 90+2'	Stadium: Salt Lake Stadium; Attendance: 52,730; Referee: Pratik Mondal; Man of the Match: Dejan Dražić (Mohun Bagan SG)

=== Indian Super League ===
East Bengal are the defending champions of the Indian Super League having won the top tier national league last season.

==== League Table ====
Pos	Team	Pld	W	D	L	GF	GA	GD	Pts	Qualification
3	NorthEast United	5	3	2	0	8	2	+6	11	Qualification for the knockouts
4	Delhi	6	2	2	2	12	10	+2	8	Qualification for the knockouts
5	East Bengal	4	2	1	1	14	8	+6	7	Qualification for the knockouts
6	Punjab	4	2	1	1	7	5	+2	7	Qualification for the knockouts
7	Goa	4	1	2	1	5	5	0	5	

Updated to match(es) played on 7 November 2026. Source: Indian Super League
Rules for classification: 1) points; 2) goal difference; 3) number of goals scored; 4) head-to-head points; 5) head-to-head goal difference; 6) head-to-head goals scored; 7) fair play ranking; 8) drawing of lots
(Note: Head-to-head record is used only after all the matches between the teams in question have been played).

==== Result summary ====
Overall								Home						Away					
Pld	W	D	L	GF	GA	GD	Pts	W	D	L	GF	GA	GD	W	D	L	GF	GA	GD
4	2	1	1	14	8	+6	7	0	1	0	2	2	0	2	0	1	12	6	+6

==== Results by match ====
Match	1	2	3	4	5	6	7	8	9	10	11	12
Ground	A	A	A	H	H	H	A	A	H	H	H	A
Result	W	W	L	D								
Position	3	1	6	5								

Updated to match(es) played on 20 November 2026. Source: indiansuperleague.com
A = Away; H = Home; W = Win; D = Draw; L = Loss

==== Matches ====
18 October 2026 Round 1	Churchill Brothers	0–4	East Bengal	Fatorda
17:00 IST	Bora (yellow card) 5'; Anil Rama Gaonkar (yellow card) 8'; Maibam Deny Singh (yellow card) 20'	Report; PDF Report	Ramírez 2'; Lalrindika 45'; Bipin 85', 90+1'; Rashid (yellow card) 90+3'	Stadium: Fatorda Stadium; Attendance: 8,011; Referee: Harish Kundu; Man of the Match: Edmund Lalrindika (East Bengal)

23 October 2026 Round 2	Inter Kashi	1–5	East Bengal	Pune
17:00 IST	Lalchungnunga 28' (og.); Vaz (yellow card) 34'; Chowdhary (yellow card) 54'	Report; PDF Report	Ramírez 8'; Vishnu 16'; Loba 22' (pen.), 35' (yellow card) 58'; Rashid (yellow card) 34'; Zwoliński 81'	Stadium: Balewadi Stadium; Attendance: 2,362; Referee: Mrutyunjay L Amatya; Man of the Match: Dani Ramírez (East Bengal)

7 November 2026 Round 3	Chennaiyin	5–3	East Bengal	Chennai
19:30 IST	Fernandes 4', 18'; Tanque 41' (pen.); Yadwad 59', 67'	Report; PDF Report	Loba 29'; Rashid (yellow card) 40'; Ramírez (yellow card) 45+2' (goal) 48' (pen.); Lalhlansanga 90+1'	Stadium: Jawaharlal Nehru Stadium; Attendance: 5,233; Referee: Harish Kundu; Man of the Match: Irfan Yadwad (Chennaiyin)

20 November 2026 Round 4	East Bengal	2–2	SC Delhi	Kolkata
17:00 IST	Lalrindika 40'; Živulić (yellow card) 72'; Loba 83'; Gupta (yellow card) 84'	Report; PDF Report	Fortes 31' (pen.); Mehta 67'	Stadium: Salt Lake Stadium; Attendance: 4,251; Referee: Jehrul Islam; Man of the Match: Ashutosh Mehta (Delhi)

29 November 2026 Round 5^{KD}	East Bengal	–	Mohun Bagan SG	Kolkata
19:30 IST		Report		Stadium: Salt Lake Stadium

4 December 2026 Round 6	East Bengal	–	Punjab	Kolkata
19:30 IST		Report		Stadium: Salt Lake Stadium

13 December 2026 Round 7	Mumbai	–	East Bengal	Mumbai
17:00 IST		Report		Stadium: Mumbai Football Arena

17 December 2026 Round 8	Bengaluru	–	East Bengal	Bengaluru
19:30 IST		Report		Stadium: Sree Kanteerava Stadium

21 December 2026 Round 9	East Bengal	–	NorthEast United	Kolkata
19:30 IST		Report		Stadium: Salt Lake Stadium

3 January 2027 Round 10	East Bengal	–	Odisha	Kolkata
17:00 IST		Report		Stadium: Salt Lake Stadium

9 January 2027 Round 11	East Bengal	–	Goa	Kolkata
17:00 IST		Report		Stadium: Salt Lake Stadium

16 January 2027 Round 12	Kerala Blasters	–	East Bengal	Kochi
19:30 IST		Report		Stadium: Jawaharlal Nehru Stadium

=== Calcutta Football League ===
==== Summary ====
East Bengal participated in the 2026 CFL Premier Division and was drawn into group A for the first phase of the tournament where twenty-six teams were divided into two groups of thirteen. East Bengal fielded mostly the reserve squad led by head coach Bino George for the Calcutta Football League like the previous three seasons. East Bengal qualified for the Super Six round with two matches to spare after defeating Calcutta Customs. On 7 September, East Bengal team, consisting of the reserve team players, played against a superstar studded Mohun Bagan Super Giant team at the Barasat Stadium and drew 1–1, to finish as the toppers of the Group A.

==== Table ====
===== Group A =====
Pos	Team	Pld	W	D	L	GF	GA	GD	Pts	Qualification	EAB	BHA	MBG	CCU	UKS	KMS	RLY	KID	BSS	PTC	GGT	BMS
1	East Bengal	11	8	3	0	27	7	+20	27	Super Six round		1–1	1–1	2–0	3–0	1–0	1–0	2–0	3–3	5–1	3–0	5–1
2	Bhawanipore	11	8	3	0	21	5	+16	27	Super Six round			2–1	2–1	4–0	1–0	2–2	0–0	3–0	2–0	1–0	3–0
3	Mohun Bagan SG	11	7	2	2	26	6	+20	23	Super Six round				0–1	1–0	3–0	3–1	1–1	w/o (Note: Behala SS gave walkover to Mohun Bagan SG, as a result they were handed a 0–3 loss.)	4–0	6–0	3–0
4	Calcutta Customs	11	5	3	3	24	12	+12	18						2–2	0–1	4–0	2–2	1–1	4–2	6–0	3–0
5	United Kolkata	11	4	4	3	22	16	+6	16							1–1	3–1	1–1	2–0	4–0	7–1	2–2

Source: The Away End
Legend: Blue = home team win; Yellow = draw; Red = away team win.
Rules for classification: 1) points; 2) head-to-head points; 3) head-to-head goal difference; 4) goal difference; 5) number of goals scored; 6) drawing of lots

===== Super Six =====
Pos	Team	Pld	W	D	L	GF	GA	GD	Pts	Qualification	MBG	EAB	MDS	BHA	UTD	CLI
1	Mohun Bagan SG (C)	3	2	1	0	9	4	+5	7	Champions			3–2		1–1	5–1
2	East Bengal	3	1	2	0	8	1	+7	5				1–1		0–0	7–0
3	Mohammedan	3	1	1	1	5	4	+1	4					2–0		
4	Bhawanipore (Q)	3	1	1	1	3	2	+1	4	Eligible for I-League 3 (Note: East Bengal, Mohun Bagan SG, Mohammedan and United SC are already playing in national leagues while Coal India SPA is an institutional club making it ineligible to play in national leagues. Thus the next highest ranked team Bhawanipore is eligible for I-League 3.)					0–0	3–0
5	United SC	3	0	3	0	1	1	0	3							

Source: The Away End
Legend: Blue = home team win; Yellow = draw; Red = away team win.
Rules for classification: 1) points; 2) head-to-head points; 3) head-to-head goal difference; 4) goal difference; 5) number of goals scored; 6) drawing of lots
(C) Champions; (Q) Qualified for the phase indicated

==== Matches ====
Win Draw Loss Void

12 July 2026 1	East Bengal	3–0	George Telegraph	Kolkata
16:00 IST	Bijay Murmu (yellow card) 17'; Jesin 26'; Joseph Justin 45+3' (pen.); Mohamed Bilal 86'	Report	Pankaj Roy (yellow card) 23'; Diganta Mondal (yellow card) 85'	Stadium: East Bengal Ground; Attendance: 1,004; Referee: Dipu Roy; Man of the Match: Jay Baz (East Bengal)

15 July 2026 2	Bidhannagar MSA	1–5	East Bengal	Kolkata
15:00 IST	Sumit Mazumdar 14'; Sai Prakash (yellow card) 24'; Kuntal Mondal (yellow card) 45+3'; Somnath Yadav (yellow card) 76'	Report	Vishnu 10', 26', 45+1'; Tanmay Das (yellow card) 18'; Jesin 26'; Bijay Murmu 81'	Stadium: East Bengal Ground; Attendance: 150; Referee: Surojit Das; Man of the Match: P. V. Vishnu (East Bengal)

18 July 2026 3	East Bengal	1–0	Railway	Kolkata
15:00 IST	Jesin 49' (pen.); Joseph Justin (yellow card) 90+2'	Report	Jit Halder (yellow card) 75'	Stadium: East Bengal Ground; Attendance: 2000; Referee: Mithun Kumar Kundu; Man of the Match: Jay Baz (East Bengal)

28 July 2026 4	Pathachakra	1–5	East Bengal	Kolkata
15:00 IST	Souvik Adhikary 9'	Report	Akash Hemram 5', 62', (penalty missed) 18'; Uttam Hansda 21', 45+5'; Mohamed Bilal 88'	Stadium: East Bengal Ground; Attendance: 500; Referee: Tanmay Dhar; Man of the Match: Akash Hemram (East Bengal)

3 August 2026 5	BSS SC	3–3	East Bengal	Kolkata
15:00 IST	Shlok Tiwari 5', 37'; Avijit Kar (yellow card) 45+2'; Sukuram Sardar 47'; Austin Jijo (yellow card) 63'	Report	Bijay Murmu 31'; Mohamed Bilal 63'; Monotosh Maji 90+1'; Akash Hemram (yellow card) 90+7'	Stadium: East Bengal Ground; Attendance: 750; Referee: Shovan Roy; Man of the Match: Monotosh Maji (East Bengal)

14 August 2026 6	Bhawanipore	1–1	East Bengal	Kolkata
15:00 IST	Shyamal Besra 46'; Ieitland Syiemlieh (yellow card) 51'; Abhisek Halder (yellow card) 62'; Shibin Saad (yellow card) 82'; Sahil Harijan (yellow card) 90+4'	Report	Mohamed Bilal (yellow card) 18'; Ananthu NS 52'; Jay Baz (yellow card) 73'; Joseph Justin (yellow card) 90+4'	Stadium: East Bengal Ground; Attendance: 1500; Referee: Bimalendu Mondal; Man of the Match: Ananthu NS (East Bengal)

24 August 2026 7	Kalighat Milan Sangha	0–1	East Bengal	Kolkata
15:00 IST	Surajit Halder (yellow card) 47'; Samrat Duley (yellow card) 69'	Report	Monotosh Maji (yellow card) 48' (goal) 83' (pen.)	Stadium: East Bengal Ground; Attendance: 3,121; Referee: Rohan Dasgupta; Man of the Match: Ranjan Soren (Kalighat MS)

27 August 2026 8	Kidderpore	0–2	East Bengal	Kolkata
15:00 IST	Tushar Das (yellow card) 55'; Kiran Seikh (yellow card) 62'; Biswajit Oraon (yellow card) 68'	Report	Akash Hemram 27'; Bijay Murmu (yellow card) 51'; Mohamed Bilal 68'; Bikram Pradhan (yellow card) 86'; Robi Das (penalty missed) 90+3'	Stadium: East Bengal Ground; Attendance: 500; Referee: Dipu Roy; Man of the Match: Arnendu Dutta (Kidderpore)

30 August 2026 9	Calcutta Customs	0–2	East Bengal	Kolkata
15:00 IST	Monorajan Singh (yellow card) 10' (yellow-red card) 72'	Report	Manotos Maji 4'; Akash Hemram 36'; Ananthu N S (yellow card) 86'	Stadium: East Bengal Ground; Attendance: 1000; Referee: Surojit Das; Man of the Match: Batas Murmu (Calcutta Customs)

2 September 2026 10	United Kolkata	0–3	East Bengal	Naihati
15:00 IST	Pratik Lama (yellow card) 27'; Joy Bhattacharjee (yellow card) 62'; Babai Pailan (yellow card) 90+7'	Report	Akash Hemram 23', 86', 90+4'; Suman Dey (yellow card) 74'	Stadium: Bankimanjali Stadium; Attendance: 450; Referee: Rabin Biswas; Man of the Match: Akash Hemram (East Bengal)

7 September 2026^{(KD)} 11	East Bengal	1–1	Mohun Bagan SG	Kolkata
17:00 IST	Chaku Mandi (yellow card) 33'; Bijay Murmu (yellow card) 45+2'; Mohamed Bilal 65'; Jay Baz (yellow card) 83'	Report	Manvir 39'; Banerjee (yellow card) 49'	Stadium: Barasat Stadium; Attendance: 10,500; Referee: Surojit Das; Man of the Match: Mohamed Bilal (East Bengal)

11 September 2026 Super Six	United SC	0–0	East Bengal	Kolkata
15:00 IST	Jishnu KS (yellow card) 26'	Report	Monotosh Chakladar (yellow card) 47'; Mohamed Bilal (yellow card) 67'	Stadium: East Bengal Ground; Attendance: 1000; Referee: Mithun Kumar Kundu; Man of the Match: Sourav Samanta (United SC)

14 September 2026 Super Six	East Bengal	1–1	Mohammedan	Kolkata
15:00 IST	Suvo Biswas (yellow card) 29'; Suman Dey (yellow card) 57'; Akash Hemram 90+5'	Report	Arpit Chettri (yellow card) 45+1'; Nikjil Deka (yellow card) 68'; Lalthankima 69'	Stadium: Barasat Stadium; Attendance: 3,500; Referee: Dipu Roy; Man of the Match: Lalthankima (Mohammedan)

19 September 2026 Super Six	Coal India SPA	0–7	East Bengal	Kolkata
15:00 IST	Irfan Sardar (yellow card) 90+2'; Sanjoy Kumar Bhattacharyya (yellow card) 90+3'	Report	Mohamed Bilal 2'; Bijay Murmu 11', 60'; Akash Hemram 53', 90+9'; Tanmay Das 66' (pen.); Uttam Hansda 90+8'	Stadium: East Bengal Ground; Attendance: 2,000; Referee: Rabin Biswas; Man of the Match: Bijay Murmu (East Bengal)

=== Sikkim Gold Cup ===
East Bengal participated in the 2026 Sikkim Gold Cup and started the tournament from quarterfinals. East Bengal fielded mostly the reserve squad led by head coach Archisman Biswas for the Sikkim Gold Cup like the previous season.

==== Bracket ====
Pre-Qualifying
Sikkim Aakraman	2
Garhwal Heroes	0
Black Eagle SC	3
GTA XI	1

Pre-Quarter
Gokulam Kerala	4
Thunderbolt North United	1
Sikkim Aakraman (p)	0 (5)
Odisha XI	0 (3)
Singling FC	4
Oil India	1
Black Eagle SC	5
Banaras Baghpat	0

Quarterfinals
Gokulam Kerala	2
Sudeva Delhi	1
Sikkim Aakraman	2
East Bengal	1
NorthEast United	2 (5)
Singling FC (p)	2 (6)
Shillong Lajong	3
Black Eagle SC	1

Semifinals
Gokulam Kerala	2
Sikkim Aakraman	3
Singling FC	0 (4)
Shillong Lajong (p)	0 (6)

Final
Sikkim Aakraman	2
Shillong Lajong	5

==== Matches ====
Win Draw Loss Void

11 October 2026 Quarter final	Sikkim Aakraman	2–1	East Bengal	Gangtok
14:00 IST	Nuhu Seidu 12'; Tendon Lepcha 90+1'	Report	Jay Baz 75'	Stadium: Paljor Stadium; Man of the Match: Tendon Lepcha (Sikkim Aakraman)

== Statistics ==
=== Appearances ===
Players with no appearances are not included in the list.

As of 20 November 2026

Appearances for East Bengal in 2026–27 season
No.	Pos.	Nat.	Name	Durand Cup		Indian Super League		Super Cup		IFA Shield		AFC Champions League Two		Calcutta League		Total	
No.	Pos.	Nat.	Name	Apps	Starts	Apps	Starts	Apps	Starts	Apps	Starts	Apps	Starts	Apps	Starts	Apps	Starts
Goalkeepers
1	GK	(India)	Phurba Lachenpa	2	2	—		—		3	3	2	2	—		7	7
13	GK	(India)	Prabhsukhan Singh Gill	3	3	4	4	—		—		3	3	—		10	10
70	GK	(India)	Raunak Ghosh	—		—		—		—		—		3	1	3	1
95	GK	(India)	Gourab Shaw	1	1	—		—		1	1	—		13	13	15	15
Defenders
3	RB	(India)	Hardik Bhatt	4	4	3	2	—		3	2	4	3	—		14	11
4	CB	(India)	Anwar Ali	5	5	2	2	—		0	0	5	5	—		12	12
5	CB	(India)	Lalchungnunga	5	4	4	4	—		3	3	3	3	—		15	14
17	RB	(India)	Boris Singh Thangjam	1	1	—		—		2	2	—		—		3	3
18	CB	(India)	Narender Gahlot	1	1	—		—		2	2	1	0	—		4	3
21	CB	(Croatia)	Diego Živulić	—		3	3	—		3	3	4	4	—		10	10
24	CB	(Spain)	Nacho Monsalve	2	1	—		—		—		—		—		2	1
27	LB	(India)	Jay Gupta	5	4	4	4	—		1	1	5	5	—		15	14
34	LB	(India)	Sandip Mandi	6	5	2	1	—		2	2	4	2	—		14	10
55	LB	(India)	Suvo Biswas	—		—		—		—		—		4	2	4	2
63	CB	(India)	Monotosh Chakladar	—		—		—		1	1	—		9	9	10	10
68	CB	(India)	Ankan Bhattacharya	—		—		—		—		—		7	6	7	6
69	CB	(India)	Sonam Tsewang Lhokham	—		—		—		—		—		2	2	2	2
72	LB	(India)	Bikram Pradhan	—		—		—		1	1	—		7	7	8	8
77	RB	(India)	Jay Baz	—		—		—		1	0	—		14	14	15	14
78	RB	(India)	Soumik Koley	—		—		—		—		—		4	0	4	0
81	RB	(India)	Suman Dey	—		—		—		—		—		8	3	8	3
85	CB	(India)	Chaku Mandi	—		—		—		—		—		9	9	9	9
90	CB	(India)	Justin Joseph	—		—		—		—		—		6	6	6	6
Midfielders
6	CM	(India)	Rohit Kumar	4	2	3	1	—		3	3	3	0	—		13	6
7	LW	(India)	P. V. Vishnu	4	3	4	3	—		3	1	1	0	2	2	14	9
10	RW	(India)	Edmund Lalrindika	6	5	3	2	—		1	1	5	5	—		15	13
11	AM	(Spain)	Dani Ramírez	6	5	4	4	—		2	2	5	5	—		17	16
19	LW	(India)	Rohit Danu	4	1	2	1	—		3	2	2	0	—		11	4
20	CM	(India)	Raynier Fernandes	—		—		—		1	1	1	0	—		2	1
23	CM	(India)	Souvik Chakrabarti	0	0	—		—		1	1	0	0	—		1	1
25	CM	(India)	Jeakson Singh	6	5	4	3	—		3	2	5	5	—		18	15
29	LW	(India)	Bipin Singh	6	3	4	3	—		2	1	5	3	—		17	10
36	RW	(India)	Mohammed Asif Khan	2	0	—		—		2	1	2	1	—		6	2
50	CM	(India)	Uttam Hansda	—		—		—		—		—		11	8	11	8
53	CM	(India)	Ananthu N. S.	—		—		—		1	0	—		12	7	13	7
57	RW	(India)	Arunlal M.	—		—		—		—		—		5	0	5	0
58	CM	(India)	Sanjib Ghosh	—		—		—		—		—		8	3	8	3
61	CM	(India)	Tanmay Das	—		—		—		—		—		12	12	12	12
62	CM	(India)	Laikhuram Ricky Singh	—		—		—		1	0	—		5	5	6	5
66	CM	(India)	Akash Hemram	—		—		—		1	1	—		13	11	14	12
67	CM	(India)	Dilip Oraon	—		—		—		—		—		1	0	1	0
74	CM	(Palestine)	Mohammed Rashid	6	5	4	4	—		2	1	5	5	—		17	15
76	CM	(India)	Batas Murmu	—		—		—		1	0	—		2	1	3	1
80	MF	(India)	Rabi Das	—		—		—		—		—		3	0	3	0
87	RW	(India)	Bijay Murmu	—		—		—		1	1	—		12	12	13	13
88	CM	(India)	Debayan Hazra	—		—		—		—		—		2	1	2	1
Forwards
8	FW	(Australia)	Chris Ikonomidis	3	1	1	0	—		3	2	1	0	—		8	3
14	FW	(India)	David Lalhlansanga	5	2	4	2	—		2	2	5	3	—		16	9
22	FW	(India)	Jesin TK	6	3	—		—		1	1	1	1	3	3	11	8
56	FW	(India)	Monotos Maji	—		—		—		—		—		10	10	10	10
65	FW	(India)	Mohamed Bilal	—		—		—		2	0	—		14	3	16	3
75	FW	(India)	Arghya Sarkar	—		—		—		—		—		2	1	2	1
90	FW	(Ivory Coast)	Aké Arnaud Loba	—		4	3	—		2	0	3	0	—		9	3
99	FW	(Poland)	Łukasz Zwoliński	—		2	1	—		2	0	2	0	—		6	1
~~99~~	FW	(India)	Devadath S.	—		—		—		—		—		8	2	8	2

=== Goal scorers ===
As of 20 November 2026

Rank	No.	Pos.	Nat.	Name	Durand Cup	Indian Super League	Super Cup	IFA Shield	AFC Champions League Two	Calcutta League	Total
1	66	LW	(India)	Akash Hemram	—	—	—	1	—	10	11
2	7	LW	(India)	P. V. Vishnu	4	1	—	—	—	3	8
2	14	FW	(India)	David Lalhlansanga	1	1	—	3	3	—	8
4	65	FW	(India)	Mohamed Bilal	—	—	—	—	—	6	6
5	10	AM	(India)	Edmund Lalrindika	3	2	—	—	0	—	5
5	11	MF	(Spain)	Dani Ramírez	1	3	—	—	1	—	5
5	22	FW	(India)	Jesin TK	2	—	—	—	—	3	5
5	29	MF	(India)	Bipin Singh	3	2	—	—	—	—	5
5	90	FW	(Ivory Coast)	Aké Arnaud Loba	—	4	—	1	0	—	5
9	87	RW	(India)	Bijay Murmu	—	—	—	—	—	4	4
9	50	AM	(India)	Uttam Hansda	—	—	—	—	—	3	3
9	56	FW	(India)	Monotos Maji	—	—	—	—	—	3	3
12	6	MF	(India)	Rohit Kumar	0	—	—	2	0	—	2
12	19	LW	(India)	Rohit Danu	0	—	—	1	1	—	2
12	74	MF	(Palestine)	Mohammed Rashid	1	—	—	—	1	—	2
12	99	FW	(Poland)	Łukasz Zwoliński	—	1	—	1	0	—	2
15	3	DF	(India)	Hardik Bhatt	1	—	—	—	—	—	1
15	4	DF	(India)	Anwar Ali	0	—	—	—	1	—	1
15	8	FW	(Australia)	Chris Ikonomidis	0	—	—	1	0	—	1
15	25	MF	(India)	Jeakson Singh	1	—	—	—	—	—	1
15	27	LB	(India)	Jay Gupta	0	—	—	—	1	—	1
15	53	MF	(India)	Ananthu NS	—	—	—	—	—	1	1
15	61	MF	(India)	Tanmay Das	—	—	—	—	—	1	1
15	90	DF	(India)	Joseph Justin	—	—	—	—	—	1	1
Own Goals					1	0	0	0	0	0	0
Total					18	14	0	10	8	35	85

==== Hat-tricks ====
Player	Against	Result	Date	Competition
(India) Vishnu PV	Bidhannagar MSA	5–1	15 July 2026	Calcutta Football League
(India) Vishnu PV	CISF Protectors	8–0	31 July 2026	Durand Cup
(India) Edmund Lalrindika	Mohun Bagan Super Giant	4–1	23 August 2026	Durand Cup
(India) Akash Hemram	United Kolkata	3–0	2 September 2026	Calcutta Football League
(India) David Lalhlansanga	NorthEast United	7–2	5 October 2026	IFA Shield

=== Assists ===
As of 20 November 2026

Rank	No.	Pos.	Nat.	Name	Durand Cup	Indian Super League	Super Cup	IFA Shield	AFC Champions League Two	Calcutta League	Total
1	11	AM	(Spain)	Dani Ramírez	2	3	—	1	1	—	7
2	87	RW	(India)	Bijay Murmu	—	—	—	—	—	6	6
3	7	AM	(India)	P. V. Vishnu	0	1	—	3	—	1	5
3	66	LW	(India)	Akash Hemram	—	—	—	1	—	4	5
3	74	MF	(Palestine)	Mohammed Rashid	2	—	—	1	2	—	5
5	8	LW	(Australia)	Chris Ikonomidis	1	1	—	2	0	—	4
5	56	FW	(India)	Monotos Maji	—	—	—	—	—	4	4
7	53	MF	(India)	Ananthu N.S.	—	—	—	—	—	3	3
7	77	RB	(India)	Jay Baz	—	—	—	—	—	3	3
10	3	RB	(India)	Hardik Bhatt	1	—	—	—	1	—	2
10	14	FW	(India)	David Lalhlansanga	0	1	—	—	1	—	2
10	22	FW	(India)	Jesin TK	1	—	—	—	—	1	2
10	29	LW	(India)	Bipin Singh	1	1	—	—	—	—	2
10	61	CM	(India)	Tanmay Das	—	—	—	—	—	2	2
10	65	FW	(India)	Mohamed Bilal	—	—	—	1	—	1	2
10	90	FW	(Ivory Coast)	Aké Arnaud Loba	—	2	—	0	0	—	2
14	5	CB	(India)	Lalchungnunga	1	—	—	—	—	—	1
14	6	CM	(India)	Rohit Kumar	—	0	—	—	—	—	1
14	10	RW	(India)	Edmund Lalrindika	1	—	—	—	—	—	1
14	17	RB	(India)	Boris Singh Thangjam	0	—	—	1	—	—	1
14	19	LW	(India)	Rohit Danu	1	—	—	—	0	—	1
14	25	DM	(India)	Jeakson Singh	1	—	—	—	—	—	1
14	27	LB	(India)	Jay Gupta	1	—	—	—	—	—	1
14	34	LB	(India)	Sandip Mandi	1	—	—	—	—	—	1
Total					14	10	0	10	6	25	59

=== Clean sheets ===
As of 27 October 2026

No.	Nat.	Player	Durand Cup	Indian Super League	Super Cup	IFA Shield	AFC Champions League Two	Calcutta League	Total
1	(India)	Phurba Lachenpa	2	—	—	—	1	—	3
13	(India)	Prabhsukhan Singh Gill	1	1	—	—	0	—	2
70	(India)	Raunak Ghosh	—	—	—	—	—	0	0
95	(India)	Gourab Shaw	1	—	—	0	—	8	9

=== Disciplinary record ===
As of 20 November 2026

No.	Nat.	Name	Durand Cup				Indian Super League				Super Cup				IFA Shield				AFC Champions League			
No.	Nat.	Name	Yellow card	(yellow card) (red card)	(yellow card) (yellow-red card)	Red card	Yellow card	(yellow card) (red card)	(yellow card) (yellow-red card)	Red card	Yellow card	(yellow card) (red card)	(yellow card) (yellow-red card)	Red card	Yellow card	(yellow card) (red card)	(yellow card) (yellow-red card)	Red card	Yellow card	(yellow card) (red card)	(yellow card) (yellow-red card)	Red card
3	(India)	Hardik Bhatt	0	0	0	0	—				—				—				1	0	0	0
5	(India)	Lalchungnunga	0	0	0	0	0	0	0	0	—				0	0	0	0	1	0	0	0
6	(India)	Rohit Kumar	0	0	0	0	—				—				1	0	0	0	2	0	0	0
10	(India)	Edmund Lalrindika	1	0	0	0	—				—				—				1	0	0	0
11	(Spain)	Dani Ramírez	1	0	0	0	1	0	0	0	—				1	0	0	0	1	0	0	0
13	(India)	Prabhsukhan Singh Gill	1	0	0	0	—				—				—				1	0	0	0
14	(India)	David Lalhlansanga	1	0	0	0	—				—				—				1	0	0	0
90	(Croatia)	Diego Živulić	—				1	0	0	0	—				—				0	0	0	0
25	(India)	Jeakson Singh	1	0	0	0	—				—				2	0	0	0	2	0	0	0
27	(India)	Jay Gupta	0	0	0	0	1	0	0	0	—				0	0	0	0	1	0	0	0
34	(India)	Sandip Mandi	1	0	0	0	—				—				1	0	0	0	1	0	0	0
63	(India)	Monotosh Chakladar	—				—				—				1	0	0	0	—			
74	(Palestine)	Mohammed Rashid	0	0	0	0	3	0	0	0	—				—				1	0	0	0
90	(Ivory Coast)	Aké Arnaud Loba	—				1	0	0	0	—				—				0	0	0	0

== See also ==
- 2026–27 in Indian football
