= 2026 Durand Cup =

Football competition in India

IndianOil Durand Cup 2026

Tournament details
- Country: India
- Venue(s): Kolkata, Ranchi, Guwahati, Imphal & Shillong
- Dates: 25 July – 23 August
- Teams: 24

Final positions
- Champions: East Bengal (17th title)
- Runners-up: Mohun Bagan

Tournament statistics
- Matches played: 43
- Goals scored: 178 (4.14 per match)
- Attendance: 549,754 (12,785 per match)
- Top goal scorer(s): (Morocco) Alaaeddine Ajaraie (NorthEast United) (9 goals)

The 2026 Durand Cup (also known as the IndianOil Durand Cup due to sponsorship ties with the Indian Oil Corporation) was the 135th edition of the Durand Cup, the oldest football tournament in Asia, and the fifth edition since it was supported by the Asian Football Confederation. The tournament is hosted by the Durand Football Tournament Society in co-operation with the AIFF, Eastern Command of the Indian Army and the Government of West Bengal, supported by the governments of Assam, Meghalaya, Manipur and Jharkhand.

NorthEast United are the defending champions, having defeated Diamond Harbour in the 2025 final.

East Bengal won the final 4–1 to claim their 17th Durand Cup title.

== Teams ==
The edition will have seven debutants, including the Defenders FC from the Sri Lanka Armed Forces and the 2026 Meghalaya State League champions, Nongkseh SS&CC.

Locations of the participating teams
Location of the Kolkata teams tents and stadiums

Team	Head coach	Captain	Location
Indian Super League teams
Delhi	(Poland) Tomasz Tchórz	(India) Lamgoulen Hangshing	New Delhi, Delhi
East Bengal	(Spain) Antonio Lopez	(India) Anwar Ali	Kolkata, West Bengal
Jamshedpur	(India) Kaizad Ambapardiwalla	(India) Pronay Halder	Jamshedpur, Jharkhand
Mohun Bagan	(Greece) Panagiotis Dilmperis	(India) Subhasish Bose	Kolkata, West Bengal
NorthEast United	(Spain) Juan Pedro Benali	(India) Tondonba Singh	Guwahati, Assam
Indian Football League teams
Mohammedan	(India) Mehrajuddin Wadoo	(India) Mahitosh Roy	Kolkata, West Bengal
Shillong Lajong	(India) Birendra Thapa	(India) Kenstar Kharshong	Shillong, Meghalaya
I-League 2 teams
Banaras Baghpat	(India) Vivek Kumar	(India) Senthamil S	Baghpat, Uttar Pradesh
Morning Star	(India) C A Laldinsang Pudaite	(India) Komalson Rongphar	Diphu, Assam
Raengdai	(India) Birbal Singh Kshetrimayum	(India) Pantiga Kamei	Noney, Manipur
I-League 3 teams
Mumbay	(India) Ajay Gopal Acharya	(India) Mohammed Kaif Khan	Mumbai, Maharashtra
NEROCA	(India) Yumnam Raju Mangang	(India) Lourembam David Singh	Imphal, Manipur
Samaleswari	(India) Abdul Azim Siddique	(Ivory Coast) Armand Bazie	Sambalpur, Odisha
TRAU	(India) Thangjam Saran Singh	(India) Sapam Nongpokngnba	Imphal, Manipur
State league teams
Bodoland	(India) Vikash Panthi	(India) Halicharan Narzary	Kokrajhar, Assam
Srinagar FC1	(India) Khalid Qayoom	(India) Ikhlaq Fayaz	Srinagar, Jammu and Kashmir
Langsning	(India) Khlain Pyrkhat Syiemlieh	(India) Atlanson Kharmaw	Shillong, Meghalaya
Nongkseh SS&CC	(India) Joseph Naik	(India) Hardy Nongbri	Shillong, Meghalaya
South United	(India) Kaja Mohideen Bhadussa	(India) Noel S	Bengaluru, Karnataka
Indian Armed Forces teams
Indian Air Force	(India) Priya Darshan	(India) Jijo Jerone	New Delhi, Delhi
Indian Army	(India) Antony Ramesh	(India) Bhabindra Malla Thakuri	New Delhi, Delhi
Indian Navy	(India) Akash Kamble	(India) Bhaskar Roy	Kochi, Kerala
CISF Protectors	(India) Shehzad Khan	(India) Thangminlien Haokip	New Delhi, Delhi
Guest invitees/Foreign armed forces teams
Sri Lanka Army	(Sri Lanka) CP Wanigasooriya	(Sri Lanka) RAC Maadushan	Homagama, Sri Lanka

== Venues ==
Kolkata		Ranchi
Vivekananda Yuba Bharati Krirangan	Kishore Bharati Krirangan	Birsa Munda Stadium
Capacity: 68,000	Capacity: 12,000	Capacity: 40,000
Shillong	Guwahati	Imphal
Jawaharlal Nehru Stadium	Indira Gandhi Athletic Stadium	Khuman Lampak Main Stadium
Capacity: 17,500	Capacity: 21,600	Capacity: 35,285

== Group stage ==
=== Group A ===
Pos	Team	Pld	W	D	L	GF	GA	GD	Pts	Qualification	MBG	EAB	SOU	CIS
1	Mohun Bagan (H)	3	3	0	0	15	0	+15	9	knockout stage		1–0	8–0	6–0
2	East Bengal (H)	3	2	0	1	13	1	+12	6	knockout stage			5–0	8–0
3	South United	3	1	0	2	2	13	−11	3					2–0
4	CISF Protectors	3	0	0	3	0	16	−16	0					

Source: DFTS
Legend: Blue = home team win; Yellow = draw; Red = away team win.
Rules for classification: Group stage tiebreakers
(H) Hosts

=== Group B ===
Pos	Team	Pld	W	D	L	GF	GA	GD	Pts	Qualification	ARM	SFC	MSC	FBB
1	Indian Army	3	3	0	0	7	1	+6	9	knockout stage		1–0	2–1	4–0
2	Samaleswari	3	2	0	1	7	4	+3	6				3–2	4–1
3	Mohammedan (H)	3	1	0	2	7	5	+2	3					4–0
4	Banaras Baghpat	3	0	0	3	1	12	−11	0					

Source: DFTS
Legend: Blue = home team win; Yellow = draw; Red = away team win.
Rules for classification: Group stage tiebreakers
(H) Hosts

=== Group C ===
Pos	Team	Pld	W	D	L	GF	GA	GD	Pts	Qualification	SCD	JAM	IAF	DFC
1	Delhi	3	3	0	0	16	2	+14	9	knockout stage		2–1	7–1	7–0
2	Jamshedpur (H)	3	2	0	1	12	2	+10	6	knockout stage			6–0	5–0
3	Indian Air Force	3	1	0	2	3	14	−11	3					2–1
4	Sri Lanka Army	3	0	0	3	1	14	−13	0					

Source: DFTS
Legend: Blue = home team win; Yellow = draw; Red = away team win.
Rules for classification: Group stage tiebreakers
(H) Hosts

=== Group D ===
Pos	Team	Pld	W	D	L	GF	GA	GD	Pts	Qualification	RGD	TRA	NER	NVY
1	Raengdai (H)	3	2	0	1	6	6	0	6	knockout stage		4–3	1–3	1–0
2	TRAU (H)	3	1	1	1	5	5	0	4				0–0	2–1
3	NEROCA (H)	3	1	1	1	3	3	0	4					0–2
4	Indian Navy	3	1	0	2	3	3	0	3					

Source: DFTS
Legend: Blue = home team win; Yellow = draw; Red = away team win.
Rules for classification: Group stage tiebreakers
(H) Hosts

=== Group E ===
Pos	Team	Pld	W	D	L	GF	GA	GD	Pts	Qualification	SHI	LAN	NON	MUM
1	Shillong Lajong (H)	3	2	1	0	10	3	+7	7	knockout stage		3–3	2–0	5–0
2	Langsning (H)	3	1	2	0	10	5	+5	5				2–2	5–0
3	Nongkseh SS&CC (H)	3	1	1	1	9	4	+5	4					7–0
4	Mumbay	3	0	0	3	0	17	−17	0					

Source: DFTS
Legend: Blue = home team win; Yellow = draw; Red = away team win.
Rules for classification: Group stage tiebreakers
(H) Hosts

=== Group F ===
Pos	Team	Pld	W	D	L	GF	GA	GD	Pts	Qualification	NEU	BDO	FC1	KMS
1	NorthEast United (H)	3	3	0	0	13	2	+11	9	knockout stage		6–0	3–1	4–1
2	Bodoland (H)	3	2	0	1	9	6	+3	6				3–0	6–0
3	Srinagar FC1	3	1	0	2	3	7	−4	3					2–1
4	Morning Star (H)	3	0	0	3	2	12	−10	0					

Source: DFTS
Legend: Blue = home team win; Yellow = draw; Red = away team win.
Rules for classification: Group stage tiebreakers
(H) Hosts

=== Ranking of second-placed teams ===
Pos	Grp	Team	Pld	W	D	L	GF	GA	GD	Pts	Qualification
1	A	East Bengal	3	2	0	1	13	1	+12	6	knockout stage
2	C	Jamshedpur	3	2	0	1	12	2	+10	6	knockout stage
3	F	Bodoland	3	2	0	1	9	6	+3	6	
4	B	Samaleswari	3	2	0	1	7	4	+3	6	
5	E	Langsning	3	1	2	0	10	5	+5	5	
6	D	TRAU	3	1	1	1	5	5	0	4	

Source: DFTS

== Knockout stage ==
In the knockout stage, any draw matches would be directly decided by a penalty shootout.

Bracket

Quarter-finals
16 Aug – Ranchi
Delhi	5
Raengdai	1
16 Aug – Kolkata
East Bengal	1
Indian Army	0
17 Aug – Kolkata
Mohun Bagan (p)	1 (9)
Jamshedpur	1 (8)
17 Aug – Shillong
NorthEast United	5
Shillong Lajong	2

Semi-finals
19 Aug – Kolkata
Delhi	0 (3)
East Bengal (p)	0 (5)
20 Aug – Shillong
Mohun Bagan (p)	0 (4)
NorthEast United	0 (3)

Final
23 Aug – Kolkata
East Bengal	4
Mohun Bagan	1

=== Quarter-finals ===
16 August 2026
16:00 IST
Match 37 (1st Quarter-final)

Delhi	5–1	Raengdai
Joseph 57', 67'; Rodriguinho 81'; Juan Peña 90+3'; Lalrochana 90+7'	Report; PDF Report	Chongtham 9'

Birsa Munda Stadium, Ranchi
Attendance: 29,265
Referee: Jatinder Singh
Man of the Match: Joseph Sunny (Delhi)

16 August 2026
19:00 IST
Match 38 (2nd Quarter-final)

Indian Army	0–1	East Bengal
	Report; PDF Report	Vishnu 39'

Vivekananda Yuba Bharati Krirangan, Kolkata
Attendance: 6,251
Referee: Jehrul Islam
Man of the Match: Bhabindra Thakuri (Indian Army)

17 August 2026
16:00 IST
Match 39 (3rd Quarter-final)

Mohun Bagan	1–1	Jamshedpur
Samad 2'	Report; PDF Report	Murgaonkar 45'
Penalties
Bheke (penalty scored); Zeljković (penalty scored); Bose (penalty scored); Maclaren (penalty scored); Kiyan (penalty scored); Thapa (penalty scored); Alberto (penalty scored); Suhail (penalty scored); Tekcham (penalty scored)	9–8	(penalty scored) Lalhriatpuia; (penalty scored) R. Fernandes; (penalty scored) Aman; (penalty scored) Abhishek; (penalty scored) Pronoy; (penalty scored) Lakra; (penalty scored) Pratik; (penalty scored) Barla; (penalty missed) Lawmsangzuala

Vivekananda Yuba Bharati Krirangan, Kolkata
Attendance: 4,105
Referee: Lakshay
Man of the Match: Vishal Kaith (Mohun Bagan)

17 August 2026
19:00 IST
Match 40 (4th Quarter-final)

NorthEast United	5–2	Shillong Lajong
Ajaraie 11', 58', 69'; González 55'; Jithin 80'	Report; PDF Report	Syndai 20'; Morais 34'

Jawaharlal Nehru Stadium, Shillong
Attendance: 10,269
Referee: Pratik Mondal
Man of the Match: Alaaeddine Ajaraie (NorthEast United)

=== Semi-finals ===
19 August 2026
19:00 IST
Match 41 (1st Semi-final)

East Bengal	0–0	Delhi
	Report; PDF Report
Penalties
Ali (penalty scored); Danu (penalty scored); Lalchungnunga (penalty scored); Ikonomidis (penalty scored); Rashid (penalty scored)	5–3	(penalty missed) Peña; (penalty scored) Rodriguinho; (penalty scored) Viáfara; (penalty scored) Aimen

Vivekananda Yuba Bharati Krirangan, Kolkata
Attendance: 7,687
Referee: Venkatesh Ramachadran
Man of the Match: Prabhsukhan Singh Gill (East Bengal)

20 August 2026
19:00 IST
Match 42 (2nd Semi-final)

NorthEast United	0–0	Mohun Bagan
	Report; PDF Report
Penalties
Ninković (penalty scored); Ajaraie (penalty scored); González (penalty scored); R. Yadav (penalty missed); Gogoi (penalty missed)	3–4	(penalty scored) Bheke; (penalty scored) Bose; (penalty scored) Colaco; (penalty scored) Maclaren

Jawaharlal Nehru Stadium, Shillong
Attendance: 11,365
Referee: Harish Kundu
Man of the Match: Liston Colaco (Mohun Bagan)

=== Final ===
23 August 2026
19:00 IST
Match 43 (Final)

East Bengal	4–1	Mohun Bagan
Bipin 10'; Lalrindika 11', 22', 44'	Report; PDF Report	Manvir 33'

Vivekananda Yuba Bharati Krirangan, Kolkata
Attendance: 60,129
Referee: Aditya Purakayastha
Man of the Match: Edmund Lalrindika (East Bengal)

== Statistics ==
=== Goalscorers ===
There were 178 goals scored in 43 matches, for an average of 4.14 goals per match.

9 goals

- (Morocco) Alaaeddine Ajaraie (NorthEast United)

7 goals

- (Brazil) Rodriguinho (Delhi)

5 goals

- (India) Sahal Abdul Samad (Mohun Bagan)
- (India) Manvir Singh (Mohun Bagan)

4 goals

- (India) Halicharan Narzary (Bodoland)
- (India) Raynier Fernandes (Jamshedpur)
- (India) Everbrightson Sana (Shillong Lajong)
- (India) Syed Ahmed (Langsning)
- (India) Vishnu Puthiya Valappill (East Bengal)
- (India) Bipin Singh (East Bengal)
- (Colombia) Juan Peña (Delhi)

3 goals

- (India) Lawmsangzuala (Jamshedpur)
- (India) Basit Ahmed Bhat (Samaleswari)
- (India) Midul Doley (Raengdai)
- (India) Lalrinliana Hnamte (Delhi)
- (India) Christopher Kamei (Indian Army)
- (Brazil) Joao Vitor Morais (Shillong Lajong)
- (India) Edmund Lalrindika (East Bengal)

2 goals

- (India) Lalremsanga Fanai (Mohammedan)
- (Russia) Marat Tareck (Samaleswari)
- (India) Jesin Thonikkara (East Bengal)
- (India) Suhail Ahmad Bhat (Mohun Bagan)
- (India) Tremiki Lamurong (Shillong Lajong)
- (India) Figo Syndai (Shillong Lajong)
- (India) Afridi Buyamayum (Afridi Buyamayum)
- (India) Parthib Gogoi (NorthEast United)
- (Spain) Ethyan González (NorthEast United)
- (India) Hardy Nongbri (Nongkseh)
- (India) Dawanchwa Carlos Challam (Nongkseh)
- (India) Aman Kuzhiyil (Jamshedpur)
- (India) Devendra Murgaonkar (Jamshedpur)
- (India) Kyrmenskhem Mukhim (Langsning)
- (India) Chongtham Kishan Singh (Raengdai)

1 goal

- (Spain) Alberto Rodríguez (Mohun Bagan)
- (India) Rahul Bheke (Mohun Bagan)
- (India) Abhishek Tekcham (Mohun Bagan)
- (Australia) Jamie Maclaren (Mohun Bagan)
- (India) Rayan Chonkar (Jamshedpur)
- (India) Mohammed Sanan (Jamshedpur)
- (India) Samir Murmu (Indian Army)
- (India) Saikhom Borish Singh (Indian Army)
- (India) Shubham Rana (Indian Army)
- (India) Shafeel PP (Indian Army)
- (India) Israfil Dewan (Mohammedan)
- (India) Fardin Ali Molla (Mohammedan)
- (India) Lalthankima Khiangte (Mohammedan)
- (India) Lalngaihsaka (Mohammedan)
- (India) Lalthankima Rotluanga (Mohammedan)
- (India) Rinshid V (South United)
- (India) Ashish Chetry (South United)
- (India) Naorem Somananda Singh (Indian Air Force)
- (India) Samuel K Vanlalpeka (Indian Air Force)
- (India) Khaidem Amarjit Singh (Raengdai)
- (India) Jonah Kamei (Raengdai)
- (India) Crispin C Cleetus (Banaras Baghpat)
- (Ivory Coast) Gnohere Krizo (Samaleswari)
- (United States) Veer Joshi (Samaleswari)
- (India) Abhay Gurung (Shillong Lajong)
- NM Aflal (Sri Lanka Army)
- (India) Jeakson Singh (East Bengal)
- (India) David Lalhlansanga (East Bengal)
- (India) Hardik Bhatt (East Bengal)
- (Palestine) Mohammed Rashid (East Bengal)
- (Spain) Dani Ramírez (East Bengal)
- (India) Redeem Tlang (NorthEast United)
- (India) Lalrinzuala Lalbiaknia (NorthEast United)
- (India) Macarton Nickson (NorthEast United)
- (India) Jithin Madathil (NorthEast United)
- (Spain) Antonio Moyano (NorthEast United)
- (India) Chanam Akash Meitei (TRAU)
- (India) Afdal Varikkodan (TRAU)
- (Nigeria) Joseph Olaleye (Morning Star)
- (India) Hayat Bashir (Srinagar FC1)
- (India) Shakir Ahmad Sheikh (Srinagar FC1)
- (India) Mohmad Ilyas (Srinagar FC1)
- (India) Wadajied Kynsai Ryngkhlem (Langsning)
- (India) Dibormi Chanlang Kassar (Langsning)
- (India) Samuel Phawa (Langsning)
- (India) Mebanshngain Kurkalang (Langsning)
- (India) Muhammed Inayath (Indian Navy)
- (India) Khullakpam Zahir Khan (Indian Navy)
- (India) Roshan Panna (Indian Navy)
- (Colombia) Robinson Blandon Rendon (Bodoland)
- (India) Aron Thapa (Bodoland)
- (India) Rituraj Mohan (Bodoland)
- (India) Kaushik Daimari (Bodoland)
- (India) Gwgwmsar Gayary (Bodoland)
- (India) Kitboklang Pale (Nongkseh)
- (India) Chesterpoul Lyngdoh (Nongkseh)
- (India) Sheen Stevenson Sohktung (Nongkseh)
- (India) Mohammed Aimen (Delhi)
- (Colombia) Duván Viáfara (Delhi)
- (India) Clarence Fernandes (Delhi)
- (India) Augustine Lalrochana (Delhi)
- (Burundi) David Richard Ndayishimiye (Delhi)
- (India) Yumnam Renedy Meitei (NEROCA)
- (India) Chabungbam Linky Meitei (NEROCA)

Own goal

Player	Team	Opponent	Result	Date
(Sri Lanka) KDS Sankalpa	Sri Lanka Army	Indian Air Force	1–2	29 July 2026
(India) Mohammad Khalid	CISF Protectors	East Bengal	0–8	31 July 2026
(India) Lanchungrei Pamei	Raengdai	TRAU	4–3	3 August 2026
(India) Noel S	South United	Mohun Bagan	0–8	4 August 2026
(India) Thoudam Nani Singh	Raengdai	NEROCA	1–3	12 August 2026

=== Hat-tricks ===
Player	For	Against	Result	Date	Ref
(India) Raynier Fernandes	Jamshedpur	Sri Lanka Army	5–0	26 July 2026	
(India) Vishnu Puthiya Valappill	East Bengal FC	CISF Protectors	8–0	31 July 2026	
(Morocco) Alaaeddine Ajaraie	NorthEast United	Bodoland	6–0	1 August 2026	
(India) Midul Doley	Raengdai	TRAU	4–3	3 August 2026	
(India) Manvir Singh	Mohun Bagan	South United	8–0	4 August 2026	
(Brazil) Rodriguinho	Delhi	Sri Lanka Army	7–0	7 August 2026	
(India) Sahal Abdul Samad	Mohun Bagan	CISF Protectors	6–0	10 August 2026	
(India) Halicharan Narzary	Bodoland	Morning Star	6–0	13 August 2026	
(India) Lawmsangzuala	Jamshedpur	Indian Air Force	6–0	13 August 2026	
(Morocco) Alaaeddine Ajaraie	NorthEast United	Shillong Lajong	5–2	17 August 2026	
(India) Edmund Lalrindika	East Bengal FC	Mohun Bagan	4–1	23 August 2026	

=== Clean sheets ===
3 Clean sheets

- (India) Vishal Kaith (Mohun Bagan)

2 Clean sheets

- (India) Bhabindra Malla Thakuri (Indian Army)
- (India) Birkhang Daimary (Bodoland)
- (India) Albino Gomes (Jamshedpur)
- (India) Phurba Lachenpa (East Bengal)
- (India) Nora Fernandes (Delhi)

1 Clean sheets

- (India) Shubhadip Pandit (Mohammedan)
- (India) Sapam Nongpokngnba (TRAU)
- (India) Abujam Penand (NEROCA)
- (India) Sunil Singh (South United)
- (India) Pantiga Kamei (Raengdai)
- (India) Ranit Sarkar (Shillong Lajong)
- (India) Siwel Rymbai (Shillong Lajong)
- (India) Gourab Shaw (East Bengal)
- (India) Prabhsukhan Singh Gill (East Bengal)
- (India) Gurmeet Singh (NorthEast United)
- (India) Rajat Paul Lyngdoh (Langsning)
- (India) Bhaskar Roy (Indian Navy)
- (India) Syed Zahid Hussain Bukhari (Mohun Bagan)

== Awards ==
=== Prize money ===
The total pool of prize money for the 2026 edition is ₹3 crore (US$310,000).

Prize	Recipient	Amount
Champions	East Bengal	₹1.21 crore (US$130,000)
Runner-up	Mohun Bagan	₹60 lakh (US$62,000)
Golden glove	(India) Vishal Kaith (Mohun Bagan)	₹3 lakh (US$3,100) & a Car
Golden boot	(Morocco) Alaaeddine Ajaraie (NorthEast United)	₹3 lakh (US$3,100) & a Car
Golden ball	(India) Edmund Lalrindika (East Bengal)	₹3 lakh (US$3,100) & a Car
Semi-finalists	Delhi NorthEast United	₹25 lakh (US$26,000)
Quarter-finalists	Raengdai Indian Army Jamshedpur Shillong Lajong	₹15 lakh (US$16,000)

== Broadcasting ==
Sony Sports Network have acquired the broadcasting rights starting from 2023. The 2026 edition is being live streamed on the network's OTT platform SonyLIV as well as TV channels Sony Ten 2 and Sony Ten 2 HD.

== See also ==
- Men
  - 2026–27 ISL
  - 2026–27 IFL
  - 2026–27 I-League 2
  - 2026–27 I-League 3
  - 2026–27 Indian State Leagues
  - 2027 Federation Cup
  - 2027 RFD League
  - 2026 CFL League
- Women
  - 2026–27 IWL
  - 2026–27 IWL 2
