= 2026 Durand Cup knockout stage =

Tournament details
- Country: India
- Teams: 8

Tournament statistics
- Matches played: 7
- Goals scored: 20 (2.86 per match)
- Attendance: 129,071 (18,439 per match)

The 2026 Durand Cup knockout stage will begin with the quarter-finals on 16 August and conclude with the final match on 23 August 2026 at the Vivekananda Yuba Bharati Krirangan in Kolkata, West Bengal, which will be the 2026 Durand Cup. A total of 8 teams will compete in the knockout stage.

East Bengal won the final 4–1 to claim their 17th Durand Cup title.

== Qualified teams ==
The top-placed team and the two best runners-up from each of the six groups will qualify for the knockout stage.

Group	Winners	Best Runners-up (Best two qualify)
Group A	Mohun Bagan	East Bengal
Group B	Indian Army	—N/a
Group C	Delhi	Jamshedpur
Group D	Raengdai	—N/a
Group E	Shillong Lajong	—N/a
Group F	NorthEast United	—N/a

=== Ranking of second-placed teams ===
Pos	Grp	Team	Pld	W	D	L	GF	GA	GD	Pts	Qualification
1	A	East Bengal	3	2	0	1	13	1	+12	6	knockout stage
2	C	Jamshedpur	3	2	0	1	12	2	+10	6	knockout stage
3	F	Bodoland	3	2	0	1	9	6	+3	6	
4	B	Samaleswari	3	2	0	1	7	4	+3	6	
5	E	Langsning	3	1	2	0	10	5	+5	5	
6	D	TRAU	3	1	1	1	5	5	0	4	

Source: DFTS

== Schedule ==
The schedule was as follows.

Round	Dates
Quarter-finals	16–17 August 2026
Semi-finals	19–20 August 2026
Final	23 August 2026

== Bracket ==
In the knockout stage, for any draws matches would be directly decided by a penalty shootout.

Quarter-finals
16 Aug – Ranchi
Delhi	5
Raengdai	1
16 Aug – Kolkata
East Bengal	1
Indian Army	0
17 Aug – Kolkata
Mohun Bagan (p)	1 (9)
Jamshedpur	1 (8)
17 Aug – Shillong
NorthEast United	5
Shillong Lajong	2

Semi-finals
19 Aug – Kolkata
Delhi	0 (3)
East Bengal (p)	0 (5)
20 Aug – Shillong
Mohun Bagan (p)	0 (4)
NorthEast United	0 (3)

Final
23 Aug – Kolkata
East Bengal	4
Mohun Bagan	1

== Quarter-finals ==
16 August 2026
16:00 IST
Match 37 (1st Quarter-final)

Delhi	5–1	Raengdai
Joseph 57', 67'; Rodriguinho 81'; Juan Peña 90+3'; Lalrochana 90+7'	Report; PDF Report	Chongtham 9'

Birsa Munda Stadium, Ranchi
Attendance: 29,265
Referee: Jatinder Singh
Man of the Match: Joseph Sunny (Delhi)

16 August 2026
19:00 IST
Match 38 (2nd Quarter-final)

Indian Army	0–1	East Bengal
	Report; PDF Report	Vishnu 39'

Vivekananda Yuba Bharati Krirangan, Kolkata
Attendance: 6,251
Referee: Jehrul Islam
Man of the Match: Bhabindra Thakuri (Indian Army)

17 August 2026
16:00 IST
Match 39 (3rd Quarter-final)

Mohun Bagan	1–1	Jamshedpur
Samad 2'	Report; PDF Report	Murgaonkar 45'
Penalties
Bheke (penalty scored); Zeljković (penalty scored); Bose (penalty scored); Maclaren (penalty scored); Kiyan (penalty scored); Thapa (penalty scored); Alberto (penalty scored); Suhail (penalty scored); Tekcham (penalty scored)	9–8	(penalty scored) Lalhriatpuia; (penalty scored) R. Fernandes; (penalty scored) Aman; (penalty scored) Abhishek; (penalty scored) Pronoy; (penalty scored) Lakra; (penalty scored) Pratik; (penalty scored) Barla; (penalty missed) Lawmsangzuala

Vivekananda Yuba Bharati Krirangan, Kolkata
Attendance: 4,105
Referee: Lakshay
Man of the Match: Vishal Kaith (Mohun Bagan)

17 August 2026
19:00 IST
Match 40 (4th Quarter-final)

NorthEast United	5–2	Shillong Lajong
Ajaraie 11', 58', 69'; González 55'; Jithin 80'	Report; PDF Report	Syndai 20'; Morais 34'

Jawaharlal Nehru Stadium, Shillong
Attendance: 10,269
Referee: Pratik Mondal
Man of the Match: Alaaeddine Ajaraie (NorthEast United)

== Semi-finals ==
19 August 2026
19:00 IST
Match 41 (1st Semi-final)

East Bengal	0–0	Delhi
	Report; PDF Report
Penalties
Ali (penalty scored); Danu (penalty scored); Lalchungnunga (penalty scored); Ikonomidis (penalty scored); Rashid (penalty scored)	5–3	(penalty missed) Peña; (penalty scored) Rodriguinho; (penalty scored) Viáfara; (penalty scored) Aimen

Vivekananda Yuba Bharati Krirangan, Kolkata
Attendance: 7,687
Referee: Venkatesh Ramachadran
Man of the Match: Prabhsukhan Singh Gill (East Bengal)

20 August 2026
19:00 IST
Match 42 (2nd Semi-final)

NorthEast United	0–0	Mohun Bagan
	Report; PDF Report
Penalties
Ninković (penalty scored); Ajaraie (penalty scored); González (penalty scored); R. Yadav (penalty missed); Gogoi (penalty missed)	3–4	(penalty scored) Bheke; (penalty scored) Bose; (penalty scored) Colaco; (penalty scored) Maclaren

Jawaharlal Nehru Stadium, Shillong
Attendance: 11,365
Referee: Harish Kundu
Man of the Match: Liston Colaco (Mohun Bagan)

== Final ==
23 August 2026
19:00 IST
Match 43 (Final)

East Bengal	4–1	Mohun Bagan
Bipin 10'; Lalrindika 11', 22', 44'	Report; PDF Report	Manvir 33'

Vivekananda Yuba Bharati Krirangan, Kolkata
Attendance: 60,129
Referee: Aditya Purakayastha
Man of the Match: Edmund Lalrindika (East Bengal)
