= 2026–27 NorthEast United FC season =

2026–27 season of NorthEast United FC

NorthEast United
2026–27 season
- CEO: Mandar Tamhane
- Head Coach: Juan Pedro Benali
- Stadium: Indira Gandhi Athletic Stadium, Guwahati
- Indian Super League: 2nd
- Durand Cup: Semi-finalists
Home colours	Away colours	Third colours

The 2026–27 season was the club's 13th season in Indian Super League since its establishment in 2014. In addition to the league, they also competed in the Durand Cup and Federation Cup.

== Players ==
As of 29 July 2026

Note: Flags indicate national team as defined under FIFA eligibility rules; some limited exceptions apply. Players may hold more than one non-FIFA nationality.

No.	Pos.	Nation	Player
1	GK	IND	Gurmeet Singh
2	DF	IND	Dinesh Singh Soraisham
3	DF	IND	Tondonba Singh Ngasepam
4	DF	IND	Pramveer Singh
7	MF	IND	Abdul Rabeeh
8	MF	ESP	Antonio Moyano
9	FW	ESP	Ethyan González
10	MF	SRB	Nikola Ninković
11	FW	IND	Parthib Gogoi
12	DF	IND	Asheer Akhtar
13	MF	IND	Mayakkannan
14	FW	MAR	Alaeddine Ajaraie
15	MF	IND	Macarton Nickson
18	FW	IND	Lalrinzuala Lalbiaknia
19	DF	ESP	Eneko Satrústegui

No.	Pos.	Nation	Player
20	GK	IND	Dipesh Chauhan
21	DF	IND	Robin Yadav
22	MF	IND	Redeem Tlang
23	MF	IND	Bekey Oram
24	FW	IND	Lalbiakdika Vanlalvunga
29	MF	IND	Mohammed Arshaf
30	MF	IND	Danny Meitei Laishram
35	GK	IND	Arman Tamang
66	FW	IND	Fredy Chawngthansanga
77	DF	IND	Buanthanglun Samte
80	FW	IND	Jithin MS
99	FW	IND	Ankith Padmanabhan
—	GK	IND	Mohanraj K
—	DF	IND	Mark Zothanpuia

== Season overview ==
Competition	First match	Last match	Starting round	Final position	Record							
Competition	First match	Last match	Starting round	Final position	Pld	W	D	L	GF	GA	GD	Win %
Durand Cup	25 July 2026	21 August 2026	Group Stage	Semi-finals	5	4	1	0	18	4	+14	80.00
ISL	October 2026	April 2027	Matchday 1	TBD	0	0	0	0	0	0	+0	—
Federation Cup	April 2027	2027		TBD	0	0	0	0	0	0	+0	—
Total					5	4	1	0	18	4	+14	80.00

Source: Competitions

== Competitions ==
=== Durand Cup ===
==== Group stage ====
Pos	Team	Pld	W	D	L	GF	GA	GD	Pts	Qualification	NEU	BDO	FC1	KMS
1	NorthEast United (H)	3	3	0	0	13	2	+11	9	knockout stage		6–0	3–1	4–1
2	Bodoland (H)	3	2	0	1	9	6	+3	6				3–0	6–0
3	Srinagar FC1	3	1	0	2	3	7	−4	3					2–1
4	Morning Star (H)	3	0	0	3	2	12	−10	0					

Source: DFTS
Legend: Blue = home team win; Yellow = draw; Red = away team win.
Rules for classification: Group stage tiebreakers
(H) Hosts

1 August 2026 Match 12	NorthEast United	6–0	Bodoland	Guwahati, Assam
16:30 IST	Ajaraie 45+3', 67', 86'; Lalbiaknia 58'; Tlang 70'; Moyano 90+1'	Report; PDF Report		Stadium: Indira Gandhi Athletic Stadium; Attendance: 20,108; Referee: Kishore Gangaram Choudhuri; Man of the Match: Alaaeddine Ajaraie (NorthEast United)

8 August 2026 Match 26	NorthEast United	4–1	Morning Star	Guwahati, Assam
16:00 IST	Ajaraie 5', 49'; Nickson 83'; González 90+5'	Report; PDF Report		Stadium: Indira Gandhi Athletic Stadium; Attendance: 10,541; Referee: Shantan Agrawal; Man of the Match: Alaaeddine Ajaraie (NorthEast United)

11 August 2026 Match 30	NorthEast United	3–1	Srinagar FC1	Guwahati, Assam
19:00 IST	P. Gogoi 9', 55'; Ajaraie 68'	Report; PDF Report	Ilyas 71'	Stadium: Indira Gandhi Athletic Stadium; Attendance: 8,711; Referee: Kishore Gangaram Choudhuri; Man of the Match: Parthib Gogoi (NorthEast United)

==== Knockout stage ====
Quarter-finals
16 Aug – Ranchi
Delhi	5
Raengdai	1
16 Aug – Kolkata
East Bengal	1
Indian Army	0
17 Aug – Kolkata
Mohun Bagan (p)	1 (9)
Jamshedpur	1 (8)
17 Aug – Shillong
NorthEast United	5
Shillong Lajong	2

Semi-finals
19 Aug – Kolkata
Delhi	0 (3)
East Bengal (p)	0 (5)
20 Aug – Shillong
Mohun Bagan (p)	0 (4)
NorthEast United	0 (3)

Final
23 Aug – Kolkata
East Bengal	4
Mohun Bagan	1

17 August 2026 Match 40 (4th Quarter-final)	NorthEast United	5–2	Shillong Lajong	Shillong
19:00 IST	Ajaraie 11', 58', 69'; González 55'; Madathil 80'	Report; PDF Report	Syndai 20'; Morais 34'	Stadium: Jawaharlal Nehru Stadium; Attendance: 10,269; Referee: Pratik Mondal; Man of the Match: Alaaeddine Ajaraie (NorthEast United)

20 August 2026 Match 42 (2nd Semi-final)	NorthEast United	0–0 (3–4 p)	Mohun Bagan	Shillong
19:00 IST		Report; PDF Report		Stadium: Jawaharlal Nehru Stadium; Attendance: 11,365; Referee: Harish Kundu; Man of the Match: Liston Colaco (Mohun Bagan)
	Penalties
	P. Gogoi (penalty missed); Ninković (penalty scored); Ajaraie (penalty scored); González (penalty scored); R. Yadav (penalty missed)		(penalty scored) Bheke; (penalty scored) Bose; (penalty scored) Colaco; (penalty scored) Maclaren

=== Indian Super League ===
==== League table ====
Pos	Team	Pld	W	D	L	GF	GA	GD	Pts	Qualification
1	East Bengal	2	2	0	0	9	1	+8	6	League Shield Winners and qualification for the Challenge League preliminary stage and semi-finals
2	NorthEast United	2	2	0	0	5	1	+4	6	Qualification for the SAFF Club Championship and semi-finals
3	Bengaluru	2	2	0	0	5	2	+3	6	Qualification for the knockouts
4	Punjab	2	1	1	0	3	2	+1	4	Qualification for the knockouts
5	Mohun Bagan SG (Note: If Mohun Bagan SG, who are banned from AFC competitions until 2028–29 season. If they become Indian Super League champions, the ISL league runners-up will qualify for Challenge League preliminary stage.)	2	1	0	1	2	2	0	3	Qualification for the knockouts

Updated to match(es) played on 23 October 2026. Source: Indian Super League
Rules for classification: 1) points; 2) goal difference; 3) number of goals scored; 4) head-to-head points; 5) head-to-head goal difference; 6) head-to-head goals scored; 7) fair play ranking; 8) drawing of lots
(Note: Head-to-head record is used only after all the matches between the teams in question have been played).
