= 2026 Durand Cup group stage =

Group stage of 2026 Durand Cup

Tournament details
- Country: India
- Teams: 24

Tournament statistics
- Matches played: 36
- Goals scored: 158 (4.39 per match)
- Attendance: 420,683 (11,686 per match)

The 2026 IndianOil Durand Cup group stage will be played from 25 July to 13 August 2026. A total of 24 teams compete in the group stage to decide the 8 places in the knockout stage.

== Teams ==
As of 30 June 2026, the following teams from the Armed Forces, Central Police Forces and guest teams have confirmed their participation. The edition includes seven debutants.

Team	Location
Indian Super League teams
Delhi	New Delhi, Delhi
East Bengal	Kolkata, West Bengal
Jamshedpur	Jamshedpur, Jharkhand
Mohun Bagan	Kolkata, West Bengal
NorthEast United	Guwahati, Assam
Indian Football League teams
Shillong Lajong	Shillong, Meghalaya
Mohammedan	Kolkata, West Bengal
I-League 2 teams
Banaras Baghpat	Baghpat, Uttar Pradesh
Raengdai	Noney, Manipur
Morning Star	Diphu, Assam
I-League 3 teams
NEROCA	Imphal, Manipur
TRAU	Imphal, Manipur
Samaleswari	Sambalpur, Odisha
Mumbay	Mumbai, Maharashtra
State league teams
Bodoland	Kokrajhar, Assam
South United	Bengaluru, Karnataka
Nongkseh SS&CC	Shillong, Meghalaya
Langsning	Shillong, Meghalaya
Srinagar FC1	Srinagar, Jammu and Kashmir
Indian Armed Forces teams
Indian Air Force	New Delhi, Delhi
Indian Army	New Delhi, Delhi
Indian Navy	Kochi, Kerala
CISF Protectors	New Delhi, Delhi
Guest invitees/Foreign armed forces teams
(Sri Lanka) Sri Lankan Armed Forces	Homagama, Sri Lanka

== Format ==
In the group stage, each match is played on a single round-robin format. The table-toppers & two best second-placed teams advance to the knockout stage.

== Centralised venues ==
On 1 July, Durand Cup Organising Committee announced that the tournament would be played across 5 cities—Kolkata, Ranchi, Shillong, Guwahati and Imphal. The two venues in Kolkata will host two groups while rest of the city will host one group each. Each group has at least one team based in the host city.

- Group A & B: Vivekananda Yuba Bharati Krirangan, Kishore Bharati Krirangan
- Group C: Birsa Munda Stadium
- Group D: Khuman Lampak Main Stadium
- Group E: Jawaharlal Nehru Stadium
- Group F: Indira Gandhi Athletic Stadium

== Group A ==
Pos	Team	Pld	W	D	L	GF	GA	GD	Pts	Qualification	MBG	EAB	SOU	CIS
1	Mohun Bagan (H)	3	3	0	0	15	0	+15	9	knockout stage		1–0	8–0	6–0
2	East Bengal (H)	3	2	0	1	13	1	+12	6	knockout stage			5–0	8–0
3	South United	3	1	0	2	2	13	−11	3					2–0
4	CISF Protectors	3	0	0	3	0	16	−16	0					

Source: DFTS
Legend: Blue = home team win; Yellow = draw; Red = away team win.
Rules for classification: Group stage tiebreakers
(H) Hosts

=== Matches ===
25 July 2026 Match 1	East Bengal	0–1	Mohun Bagan	Kolkata, West Bengal
17:00 IST		Report; PDF Report	Samad 53'	Stadium: Vivekananda Yuba Bharati Krirangan; Attendance: 32,870; Referee: Lakshay; Man of the Match: Vishal Kaith (Mohun Bagan)

28 July 2026 Match 6	South United	2–0	CISF Protectors	Kolkata, West Bengal
19:30 IST	Rinshid 65'; Chetry 84'	Report; PDF Report		Stadium: Kishore Bharati Krirangan; Attendance: 62; Referee: Bimalendu Mondal; Man of the Match: Rinshid V (South United)

31 July 2026 Match 11	East Bengal	8–0	CISF Protectors	Kolkata, West Bengal
19:30 IST	Vishnu 38', 46', 76'; Mohammad Khalid 42' (o.g.); J. Thounaojam 45+3'; B. Thounaojam 64'; Jesin 70', 73'	Report; PDF Report		Stadium: Kishore Bharati Krirangan; Attendance: 4,360; Referee: Jehrul Islam; Man of the Match: Vishnu Puthiya Valappill (East Bengal)

4 August 2026 Match 18	Mohun Bagan	8–0	South United	Kolkata, West Bengal
19:00 IST	M. Singh 4', 22', 60'; Rodríguez 10'; Bheke 19'; Noel S. 69' (o.g.); S. Bhat 89', 90+1'	Report; PDF Report		Stadium: Vivekananda Yuba Bharati Krirangan; Attendance: 4,256; Referee: Jehrul Islam; Man of the Match: Manvir Singh (Mohun Bagan)

7 August 2026 Match 24	East Bengal	5–0	South United	Kolkata, West Bengal
19:00 IST	Ramírez 7'; Rashid 24'; Bhatt 73'; B. Thounaojam 81'; Lalhlansanga 90+5'	Report; PDF Report		Stadium: Vivekananda Yuba Bharati Krirangan; Attendance: Mohammed Rashid (East Bengal); Referee: Lalit Singh Rawat; Man of the Match: 4,196

10 August 2026 Match 28	Mohun Bagan	6–0	CISF Protectors	Kolkata, West Bengal
16:00 IST	Samad 17', 19', 37'; M. Singh 24'; Maclaren 69'; Tekcham 73'	Report; PDF Report		Stadium: Kishore Bharati Krirangan; Attendance: 3,547; Referee: Jarvish Macwan; Man of the Match: Sahal Abdul Samad (Mohun Bagan)

== Group B ==
Pos	Team	Pld	W	D	L	GF	GA	GD	Pts	Qualification	ARM	SFC	MSC	FBB
1	Indian Army	3	3	0	0	7	1	+6	9	knockout stage		1–0	2–1	4–0
2	Samaleswari	3	2	0	1	7	4	+3	6				3–2	4–1
3	Mohammedan (H)	3	1	0	2	7	5	+2	3					4–0
4	Banaras Baghpat	3	0	0	3	1	12	−11	0					

Source: DFTS
Legend: Blue = home team win; Yellow = draw; Red = away team win.
Rules for classification: Group stage tiebreakers
(H) Hosts

=== Matches ===
26 July 2026 Match 3	Indian Army	1–0	Samaleswari	Kolkata, West Bengal
19:30 IST	Kamei 47'	Report; PDF Report		Stadium: Kishore Bharati Krirangan; Attendance: 374; Referee: Lalit Singh Rawat; Man of the Match: Christopher Kamei (Indian Army)

27 July 2026 Match 4	Mohammedan	4–0	Banaras Baghpat	Kolkata, West Bengal
19:00 IST	Molla 29'; Fanai 73', 85'; Dewan 80'	Report; PDF Report		Stadium: Kishore Bharati Krirangan; Attendance: 3,240; Referee: Jarvish Macwan; Man of the Match: Lalremsanga Fanai (Mohammedan)

30 July 2026 Match 9	Samaleswari	4–1	Banaras Baghpat	Kolkata, West Bengal
19:00 IST	Tareck 10'; Krizo 45+1'; B. Bhat 56', 61'	Report; PDF Report	C. Cleetus 30'	Stadium: Vivekananda Yuba Bharati Krirangan; Attendance: 421; Referee: Mrutyunjay L Amatya; Man of the Match: Basit Ahmed Bhat (Samaleswari)

2 August 2026 Match 13	Mohammedan	2–3	Samaleswari	Kolkata, West Bengal
16:00 IST	Khiangte 60'; Lalngaihsaka 66'	Report; PDF Report	B. Bhat 11'; Tareck 27'; Joshi 81'	Stadium: Vivekananda Yuba Bharati Krirangan; Attendance: 3,968; Referee: Lakshay; Man of the Match: Basit Ahmed Bhat (Samaleswari)

5 August 2026 Match 20	Indian Army	4–0	Banaras Baghpat	Kolkata, West Bengal
19:00 IST	Murmu 12'; Saikhom 23'; Rana 35'; Kamei 45+2'	Report; PDF Report		Stadium: Kishore Bharati Krirangan; Attendance: 105; Referee: Bimalendu Mondal; Man of the Match: Christopher Kamei (Indian Army)

12 August 2026 Match 33	Mohammedan	1–2	Indian Army	Kolkata, West Bengal
19:00 IST	Rotluanga 35'	Report; PDF Report	Kamei 59'; Shafeel 90+2'	Stadium: Kishore Bharati Krirangan; Attendance: 7,289; Referee: Mrutyunjay L Amatya; Man of the Match: Christopher Kamei (Indian Army)

== Group C ==
Pos	Team	Pld	W	D	L	GF	GA	GD	Pts	Qualification	SCD	JAM	IAF	DFC
1	Delhi	3	3	0	0	16	2	+14	9	knockout stage		2–1	7–1	7–0
2	Jamshedpur (H)	3	2	0	1	12	2	+10	6	knockout stage			6–0	5–0
3	Indian Air Force	3	1	0	2	3	14	−11	3					2–1
4	Sri Lanka Army	3	0	0	3	1	14	−13	0					

Source: DFTS
Legend: Blue = home team win; Yellow = draw; Red = away team win.
Rules for classification: Group stage tiebreakers
(H) Hosts

=== Matches ===
26 July 2026 Match 2	Jamshedpur	5–0	Sri Lanka Army	Ranchi, Jharkhand
17:00 IST	Fernandes 4', 6', 79'; Aman 23'; Murgaonkar 39'	Report; PDF Report		Stadium: Birsa Munda Stadium; Attendance: 26,478; Referee: Jatinder Singh; Man of the Match: Raynier Fernandes (Jamshedpur)

29 July 2026 Match 7	Indian Air Force	2–1	Sri Lanka Army	Ranchi, Jharkhand
19:00 IST	Naorem 26'; Sankalpa 68' (o.g.)	Report; PDF Report	Aflal 70'	Stadium: Birsa Munda Stadium; Attendance: 23,360; Referee: Ajay Singh; Man of the Match: Naorem Somananda Singh (Indian Air Force)

4 August 2026 Match 17	Jamshedpur	1–2	Delhi	Ranchi, Jharkhand
16:00 IST	Sanan 22'	Report; PDF Report	Lalrinliana 51', 56'	Stadium: Birsa Munda Stadium; Attendance: 25,670; Referee: Surojit Das; Man of the Match: Lalrinliana Hnamte (Delhi)

7 August 2026 Match 23	Delhi	7–0	Sri Lanka Army	Ranchi, Jharkhand
16:00 IST	Rodriguinho 6', 8', 12', 89', 90+5'; Aimen 34'; Peña 90+2'	Report; PDF Report	Vanlalpeka 50'	Stadium: Birsa Munda Stadium; Attendance: 19,466; Referee: Ajay Singh; Man of the Match: Rodriguinho (Delhi)

10 August 2026 Match 29	Delhi	7–1	Indian Air Force	Ranchi, Jharkhand
19:00 IST	Rodriguinho 11'; Peña 39', 65'; Viáfara 55'; Lalrinliana 63'; C. Fernandes 79'; Ndayishimiye 90+5'	Report; PDF Report		Stadium: Birsa Munda Stadium; Attendance: 20,318; Referee: Surojit Das; Man of the Match: Mohammed Azhar (Delhi)

13 August 2026 Match 35	Jamshedpur	6–0	Indian Air Force	Ranchi, Jharkhand
16:00 IST	R. Fernandes 4'; Lawmsangzuala 55', 64', 80'; Aman 71'; Rayan 85'	Report; PDF Report		Stadium: Birsa Munda Stadium; Attendance: 24,056; Referee: Jatinder Singh; Man of the Match: Lawmsangzuala (Jamshedpur)

== Group D ==
Pos	Team	Pld	W	D	L	GF	GA	GD	Pts	Qualification	RGD	TRA	NER	NVY
1	Raengdai (H)	3	2	0	1	6	6	0	6	knockout stage		4–3	1–3	1–0
2	TRAU (H)	3	1	1	1	5	5	0	4				0–0	2–1
3	NEROCA (H)	3	1	1	1	3	3	0	4					0–2
4	Indian Navy	3	1	0	2	3	3	0	3					

Source: DFTS
Legend: Blue = home team win; Yellow = draw; Red = away team win.
Rules for classification: Group stage tiebreakers
(H) Hosts

=== Matches ===
28 July 2026 Match 5	TRAU	0–0	NEROCA	Imphal, Manipur
17:00 IST		Report; PDF Report		Stadium: Khuman Lampak Main Stadium; Attendance: 23,475; Referee: I Jamal Mohamed; Man of the Match: Sapam Nongpokngnba (TRAU)

30 July 2026 Match 8	Raengdai	1–0	Indian Navy	Imphal, Manipur
16:00 IST	Khaidem 59'	Report; PDF Report		Stadium: Khuman Lampak Main Stadium; Attendance: 22,510; Referee: Rohan Das Gupta; Man of the Match: Amarjit Singh Khaidem (Raengdai)

3 August 2026 Match 14	TRAU	3–4	Raengdai	Imphal, Manipur
16:00 IST	Chanam 43'; Varikkodan 47'; Lanchungrei 67' (o.g.)	Midul Doley (Raengdai) Report; PDF Report	Doley 14', 24', 79'; Chongtham 45+4'	Stadium: Khuman Lampak Main Stadium; Attendance: 16,757; Referee: Ajay Krishnan

5 August 2026 Match 19	NEROCA	0–2	Indian Navy	Imphal, Manipur
16:00 IST		Report; PDF Report	R. Panna 23'; Inayath 65'	Stadium: Khuman Lampak Main Stadium; Attendance: 7,713; Referee: Rohan Das Gupta; Man of the Match: Roshan Panna (Indian Navy)

9 August 2026 Match 27	TRAU	2–1	Indian Navy	Imphal, Manipur
16:00 IST	A. Buyamayum 16', 61'	Report; PDF Report	Khullakpam 46'	Stadium: Khuman Lampak Main Stadium; Attendance: 12,114; Referee: I Jamal Mohamed; Man of the Match: Afridi Buyamayum (TRAU)

12 August 2026 Match 32	NEROCA	3–1	Raengdai	Imphal, Manipur
16:00 IST	Thoudam 26' (o.g.); Chabungbam 89'; Yumnam 90+4'	Report; PDF Report	Kamei 19'	Stadium: Khuman Lampak Main Stadium; Attendance: 24,276; Referee: Ajay Krishnan; Man of the Match: Chabungbam Linky Meitei (NEROCA)

== Group E ==
Pos	Team	Pld	W	D	L	GF	GA	GD	Pts	Qualification	SHI	LAN	NON	MUM
1	Shillong Lajong (H)	3	2	1	0	10	3	+7	7	knockout stage		3–3	2–0	5–0
2	Langsning (H)	3	1	2	0	10	5	+5	5				2–2	5–0
3	Nongkseh SS&CC (H)	3	1	1	1	9	4	+5	4					7–0
4	Mumbay	3	0	0	3	0	17	−17	0					

Source: DFTS
Legend: Blue = home team win; Yellow = draw; Red = away team win.
Rules for classification: Group stage tiebreakers
(H) Hosts

=== Matches ===
31 July 2026 Match 10	Shillong Lajong	2–0	Nongkseh SS&CC	Shillong, Meghalaya
17:00 IST	Sana 70'; Lamurong 86'	Report; PDF Report		Stadium: Jawaharlal Nehru Stadium; Attendance: 11,234; Referee: Mohammed Junaid Saijad Tanji; Man of the Match: Phrangki Buam (Shillong Lajong)

3 August 2026 Match 16	Langsning	5–0	Mumbay	Shillong, Meghalaya
19:00 IST	S. Ahmed 50', 65'; Mukhim 89'; Kassar 90+5'; Phawa 90+6'	Report; PDF Report		Stadium: Jawaharlal Nehru Stadium; Attendance: 7,353; Referee: K Ramdasan; Man of the Match: Syed Ahmed (Langsning)

6 August 2026 Match 22	Nongkseh SS&CC	2–2	Langsning	Shillong, Meghalaya
19:00 IST	Tariang 29'; Nongbri 38'	Report; PDF Report	Kurkalang 48'; S. Ahmed 50'	Stadium: Jawaharlal Nehru Stadium; Attendance: 7,891; Referee: Pratik Mondal; Man of the Match: Mebanshngain Kurkalang (Langsning)

8 August 2026 Match 25	Shillong Lajong	5–0	Mumbay	Shillong, Meghalaya
19:00 IST	A. Gurung 45+1'; Lamurong 45+3'; Sana 52', 64'; Syndai 88'	Report; PDF Report		Stadium: Jawaharlal Nehru Stadium; Attendance: 7,890; Referee: K. Ramdasan

11 August 2026 Match 31	Nongkseh SS&CC	7–0	Mumbay	Shillong, Meghalaya
16:00 IST	Nongbri 11' (pen.), 79'; Pale 41'; Lyngdoh 56'; Challam 77', 82'; Sohktung 89'	Report; PDF Report		Stadium: Jawaharlal Nehru Stadium; Attendance: 3,909; Referee: Pratik Mondal; Man of the Match: Nongbri (Nongkseh)

13 August 2026 Match 36	Shillong Lajong	3–3	Langsning	Shillong, Meghalaya
19:00 IST	Morais 26', 30'; Sana 83'	Report; PDF Report	Mukhim 49'; Ryngkhlem 63'; S. Ahmed 90+2'	Stadium: Jawaharlal Nehru Stadium; Attendance: 11,279; Referee: K. Ramdasan; Man of the Match: Joao Vitor (Shillong Lajong)

== Group F ==
Pos	Team	Pld	W	D	L	GF	GA	GD	Pts	Qualification	NEU	BDO	FC1	KMS
1	NorthEast United (H)	3	3	0	0	13	2	+11	9	knockout stage		6–0	3–1	4–1
2	Bodoland (H)	3	2	0	1	9	6	+3	6				3–0	6–0
3	Srinagar FC1	3	1	0	2	3	7	−4	3					2–1
4	Morning Star (H)	3	0	0	3	2	12	−10	0					

Source: DFTS
Legend: Blue = home team win; Yellow = draw; Red = away team win.
Rules for classification: Group stage tiebreakers
(H) Hosts

=== Matches ===
1 August 2026 Match 12	NorthEast United	6–0	Bodoland	Guwahati, Assam
16:30 IST	Ajaraie 45+3', 67', 86'; Lalbiaknia 58'; Tlang 70'; Moyano 90+1'	Report; PDF Report		Stadium: Indira Gandhi Athletic Stadium; Attendance: 20,108; Referee: Kishore Gangaram Choudhuri; Man of the Match: Alaaeddine Ajaraie (NorthEast United)

3 August 2026 Match 15	Morning Star	1–2	Srinagar FC1	Guwahati, Assam
16:00 IST	Olaleye 27'	Report; PDF Report	Shakir 40'; H. Bashir 53'	Stadium: Indira Gandhi Athletic Stadium; Attendance: 4,125; Referee: Shantan Agrawal; Man of the Match: Huzafah Ahmad Dar (Srinagar FC1)

6 August 2026 Match 21	Bodoland	3–0	Srinagar FC1	Guwahati, Assam
16:00 IST	Blandon 57'; Rituraj 78'; Thapa 82'	Report; PDF Report		Stadium: Indira Gandhi Athletic Stadium; Attendance: 7,653; Referee: Mithun Kumar Kundu; Man of the Match: Halicharan Narzary (Bodoland)

8 August 2026 Match 26	NorthEast United	4–1	Morning Star	Guwahati, Assam
16:00 IST	Ajaraie 5', 49'; Nickson 83'; González 90+5'	Report; PDF Report		Stadium: Indira Gandhi Athletic Stadium; Attendance: 10,541; Referee: Shantan Agrawal; Man of the Match: Alaaeddine Ajaraie (NorthEast United)

11 August 2026 Match 30	NorthEast United	3–1	Srinagar FC1	Guwahati, Assam
19:00 IST	P. Gogoi 9', 55'; Ajaraie 68'	Report; PDF Report	Ilyas 71'	Stadium: Indira Gandhi Athletic Stadium; Attendance: 8,711; Referee: Kishore Gangaram Choudhuri; Man of the Match: Parthib Gogoi (NorthEast United)

13 August 2026 Match 34	Bodoland	6–0	Morning Star	Guwahati, Assam
16:00 IST	Narzary 11', 28', 85', 90+4'; Daimari 51'; Gayary 89'	Report; PDF Report		Stadium: Indira Gandhi Athletic Stadium; Attendance: 9,108; Referee: Mithun Kumar Kundu; Man of the Match: Halicharan Narzary (Bodoland)

== Ranking of 2nd placed teams ==
Pos	Grp	Team	Pld	W	D	L	GF	GA	GD	Pts	Qualification
1	A	East Bengal	3	2	0	1	13	1	+12	6	knockout stage
2	C	Jamshedpur	3	2	0	1	12	2	+10	6	knockout stage
3	F	Bodoland	3	2	0	1	9	6	+3	6	
4	B	Samaleswari	3	2	0	1	7	4	+3	6	
5	E	Langsning	3	1	2	0	10	5	+5	5	
6	D	TRAU	3	1	1	1	5	5	0	4	

Source: DFTS
