= 2026 Durand Cup final =

Final of the 135th edition of the Durand Cup

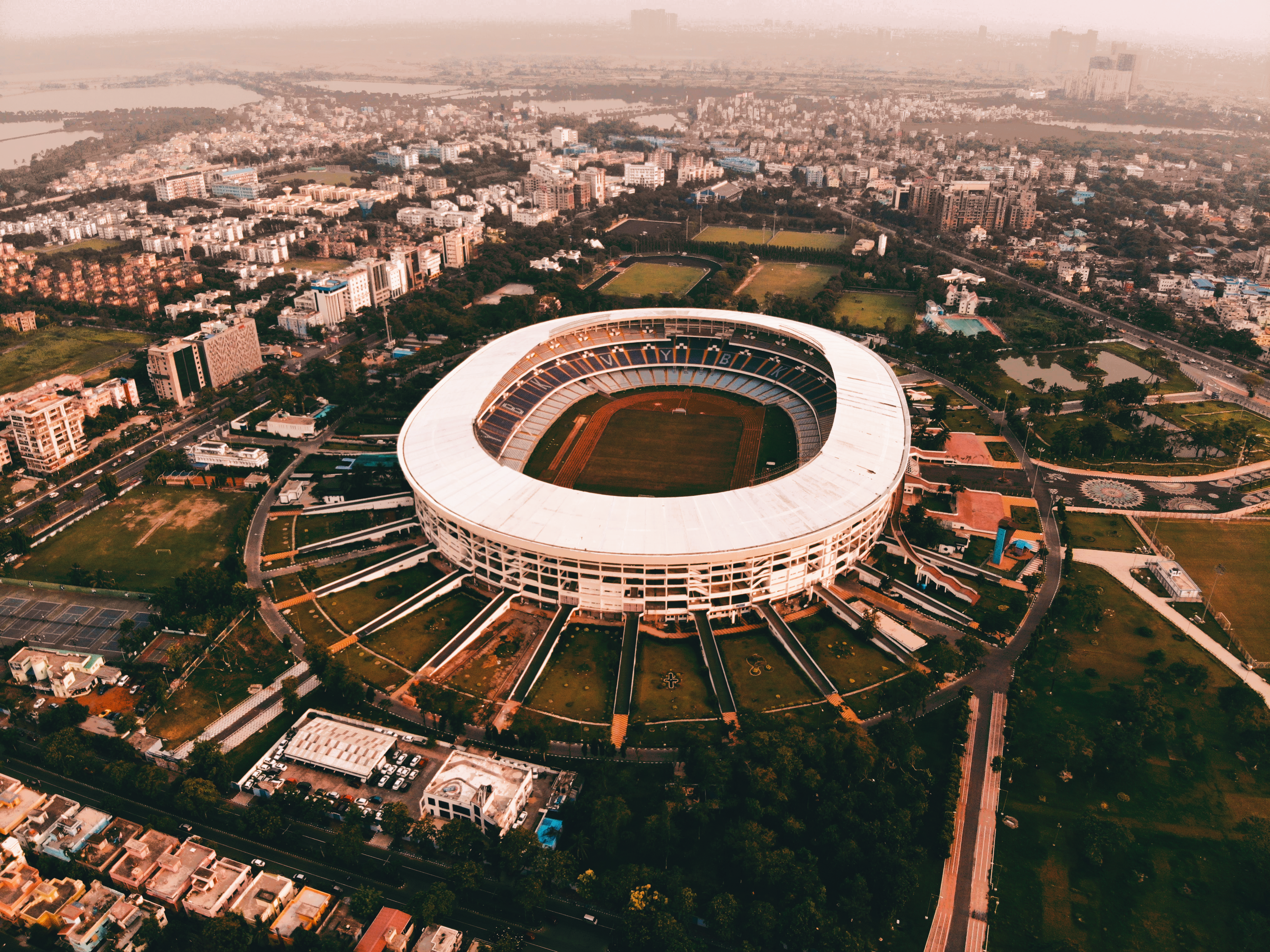
- The final match was held at the Vivekananda Yuba Bharati Krirangan in Kolkata.
- Event: 2026 Durand Cup
East Bengal	Mohun Bagan
4	1
- Date: 23 August 2026
- Venue: Vivekananda Yuba Bharati Krirangan, Kolkata
- Man of the Match: Edmund Lalrindika (East Bengal)
- Referee: Aditya Purakayastha
- Attendance: 60,129
- Weather: Rains with Humidity; 31 °C (88 °F); 52% humidity

The 2026 Durand Cup final was the final match of the 2026 Durand Cup, the 135th edition of Asia's oldest football tournament. The tournament is organised by the Durand Football Tournament Society (DFTS) in co-operation with the AIFF, the Eastern Command of the Indian Armed Forces and the Government of West Bengal, supported by the governments of Assam, Meghalaya, Manipur and Jharkhand. It was held on 23 August 2026 at the Vivekananda Yuba Bharati Krirangan in Kolkata, West Bengal, India.

East Bengal won the final 4–1 to claim their 17th Durand Cup title.

== Route to the final ==
Note: In all results below, the score of the finalist is given first.

East Bengal		Round	Mohun Bagan	
Opponent	Result	Group stage	Opponent	Result
Mohun Bagan	0–1	Matchday 1	East Bengal	1–0
CISF Protectors	8–0	Matchday 2	South United	8–0
South United	5–0	Matchday 3	CISF Protectors	6–0
Group A Runners-up: Pos / Team / Pld / Pts; 1 / Mohun Bagan (H) / 3 / 9; 2 / East Bengal (H) / 3 / 6; 3 / South United / 3 / 3; 4 / CISF Protectors / 3 / 0; Source: DFTS (H) Hosts		Final standings	Group A Winners: Pos / Team / Pld / Pts; 1 / Mohun Bagan (H) / 3 / 9; 2 / East Bengal (H) / 3 / 6; 3 / South United / 3 / 3; 4 / CISF Protectors / 3 / 0; Source: DFTS (H) Hosts	
Opponent	Result	Knockout stage	Opponent	Result
Indian Army	1–0	Quarter-finals	Jamshedpur	1–1 (9–8 p)
Delhi	0–0 (5–3 p)	Semi-finals	NorthEast United	0–0 (4–3 p)

== Match ==
=== Details ===
23 August 2026
19:00 IST
Match 43 (Final)

East Bengal	4–1	Mohun Bagan
Bipin 10'; Lalrindika 11', 22', 44'	Report; PDF Report	Manvir 33'

Vivekananda Yuba Bharati Krirangan, Kolkata
Attendance: 60,129
Referee: Aditya Purakayastha
Man of the Match: Edmund Lalrindika (East Bengal)

East Bengal	Mohun Bagan

Man of the Match:
Edmund Lalrindika (East Bengal)

Assistant referees:
Parasuraman Vairamuthu
Sumanta Dutta
Fourth official:
Venkatesh Ramachadran
Commissioner:
Abhishek Kumar Yadav
Referee assessor:
Sankar Komaleeswaran

Match rules

- 90 minutes.
- 30 minutes of extra time if necessary.
- Penalty shoot-out if scores still level.
- Maximum of ten named substitutes.
- Maximum of five substitutions,
  with a sixth allowed in extra time.

== See also ==
- 2026–27 East Bengal season
- 2026–27 Mohun Bagan season
- Kolkata Derby
- 2026–27 in Indian football
