= Samaleswari SC =

Indian association football club

Samaleswari Sporting
- Full name: Samaleswari Sporting Club
- Nickname: The Goddess's XI
- Short name: SSC
- Founded: 30 March 2006; 20 years ago
- Ground: Birsa Munda Athletic Stadium; Sambalpur FA Ground
- Capacity: 15,000; 9,000
- Owner: Jayanarayan Mishra
- Head coach: Abdul Azim Siddique
- League: Indian Football League
- 2026–27: TBA
- Website: sambalpurfootballacademy.org
Home colours	Away colours	Third colours

Samaleswari Sporting Club, also known as Samaleswari Sporting Odisha, is an Indian professional football club based in Sambalpur, Odisha. They participated in the 2025–26 I-League 3, the fourth tier of the Indian football league system. In the 2012 season, they participated in the I-League 2nd Division, the then second tier of football in India. The club has been confirmed to make its Indian Football League debut in the 2026–27 season, taking the place of Delhi FC.

== History ==
Sambalpur Football Academy

Logo till 2026

The club was founded on 3 March 2006 at Pitapali located near Hirakud Reservoir, about 15 kms from the city of Sambalpur. The club's academy, known as Sambalpur Football Academy, was established on 22 November 2008. The academy was the initiative of the area's MLA Jayanarayan Mishra, Gouri Shankar Sahani and former Chief Minister Rajendra Narayan Singh Deo. Mishra serves as the Managing Trustee and Administrator of the academy. Samaleswari Sporting have played in state and regional level tournaments such as Churachand Singh Trophy, All-India knockout tournaments, Sambalpur Cup, and Biju Patnaik Memorial Trophy.

In January 2012, they were officially certified by the All India Football Federation to participate in the I-League 2nd Division, marking its official transition to professionalism. Samaleswari finished fifth in the group A and thus did not qualify for the next round. In the 2013 I-League 2nd Division, Samaleswari won once, drew once, and lost six times, which saw them second-last in their group.

Samaleswari played their first match in the 135th Durand Cup on 26 July, against Indian Army FC, under lights at the Kishore Bharati Krirangan in Kolkata. On 2 August 2026, they pulled off a historic upset against Mohammedan SC in the same tournament, beating the Indian Super League side 3-2.

== Players ==
=== First-team squad ===
As of October 2025

Note: Flags indicate national team as defined under FIFA eligibility rules; some limited exceptions apply. Players may hold more than one non-FIFA nationality.

No.	Pos.	Nation	Player
1	GK	IND	Aaryan Saroha
3	DF	LBR	Jamal Arago
4	DF	IND	Kartik Choudhury
7	FW	IND	Lalthanmawia Renthlei
8	MF	IND	Bekey Oram
9	FW	USA	Veer Joshi
10	FW	IND	Sahil Harijan
11	FW	IND	Ankith P.
13	GK	IND	Md. Rafique Ali Sardar
14	MF	IND	Jayesh Rane
18	DF	IND	Shahid Nazir
20	MF	GHA	Kamal Issah
21	MF	IND	Sukham Yoihenba Meitei
23	MF	IND	Basit Ahmed Bhat (captain)

No.	Pos.	Nation	Player
25	DF	IND	Lalhmangaihsanga
26	FW	IND	Ishan Pandita
30	FW	ARG	Jorge Pereyra Díaz
32	MF	IND	Amarjit Singh Kiyam
34	MF	IND	Sahil Murmu
45	DF	IND	Tankadhar Bag
47	DF	IND	Raunak Nagul
60	FW	IND	Roshan Panna
66	FW	IND	Fredy Chawngthansanga
91	DF	IND	Calvin Rosario Baretto
94	DF	MAR	Mohammed El Jaaouani

=== Out on loan ===
Note: Flags indicate national team as defined under FIFA eligibility rules; some limited exceptions apply. Players may hold more than one non-FIFA nationality.

No.	Pos.	Nation	Player

== Honours ==
=== Regional ===
- All-India Knock-out Football Tournament
  - Winners: 2012
- Sambalpur Cup
  - Runners-up: 2011
- Biju Patnaik Memorial Trophy
  - Runners-up: 2011
