= 2024–25 Aizawl FC season =

Indian football club season

Aizawl
2024–25 season
- Chairman: Robert Romawia Royte
- Manager: Victor Lalbiakmawia; Stojkoski Bobi
- Stadium: Rajiv Gandhi Stadium
- I-League: TBD
| Home colours | Away colours |

The 2024–25 season will be Aizawl's 41st competitive season and its eight competitive season in the I-League.

== Technical staff ==
| Position | Name |
|---|---|
| Head coach | (India) Victor Lalbiakmawia |
| Assistant coach | (India) R. Lalruatfela |
| Manager | (India) F. Lalrinmawia |
| Manager | (North Macedonia) Stojkoski Bobi |

== Squad information ==
=== First-team players ===
As of 03 December 2024

Note: Flags indicate national team as defined under FIFA eligibility rules; some limited exceptions apply. Players may hold more than one non-FIFA nationality.

| No. | Pos. | Nation | Player |
|---|---|---|---|
| 1 | GK | IND | Vanlalhriatpuia |
| 3 | DF | IND | Supriyo Ghosh |
| 4 | DF | IND | Lalmuanawma |
| 6 | MF | IND | Lalawmpuia Sailo |
| 8 | MF | IND | Lalthankhuma |
| 9 | MF | IND | Samuel Lalmuanpuia |
| 13 | DF | IND | Lalchhawnkima (Captain) |
| 15 | FW | IND | Malsawmzuala Tlangte |
| 16 | DF | IND | Lalfemkima |
| 17 | MF | IND | Lalramsanga |
| 18 | FW | IND | Lalrinzuala Lalbiaknia |
| 19 | DF | IND | H Lalrempuia |
| 20 | GK | IND | Joel B Lalramchhana |

| No. | Pos. | Nation | Player |
|---|---|---|---|
| 21 | MF | IND | Peter Lalrinhlua |
| 22 | FW | IND | Zomuansanga |
| 27 | FW | IND | Joseph Lalvenhima |
| 28 | GK | IND | Gurmeet Singh |
| 29 | FW | IND | Augustine Lalrochana |
| 32 | FW | IND | Lalbiakdika |
| 36 | DF | IND | Rohmingthanga |
| 37 | MF | IND | Aditya Saha |
| 39 | DF | IND | Lalruatthara |

== Transfers ==
=== In ===
| Position | Player | Previous club | Date | Ref |
|---|---|---|---|---|
| FW | (India) Malsawmzuala Tlangte | (India) Rajasthan United | 30 June 2024 | |
| MF | (India) Peter lalrinhlua | | 18 July 2024 | |
| MF | (India) Samuel Lalmuanpuia | (India) Mohammedan | 18 July 2024 | |
| DF | (India) Lalruatthara | (India) Inter Kashi | 4 August 2024 | |
| MF | (India) Lalawmpuia Sailo | (India) Churchill Brothers | 29 August 2024 | |
| FW | (India) Zomuansanga | (India) Aizwawl FC 2 | 1 September 2024 | |

=== Loans in ===
| Date | Pos | Nationality | Player | Loaned from | Until | Ref |
|---|---|---|---|---|---|---|
| 17 July 2024 | FW | (India) | Laltlanzova | (India) FC Goa | 31 May 2025 | |

=== Out ===
| Date | No. | Position | Player | To | Ref |
|---|---|---|---|---|---|
| 2024 | 11 | FW | (India) HK Lalhruaitluanga | Chanmari FC | |
| 2024 | 21 | FW | (India) Bawlte Rohmingthanga | Kalighat Sports Lovers Association | |
| 1 June 2024 | 30 | MF | (India) Sheikh Sahil | (India) Jamshedpur | Loan return |
| 1 June 2024 | 42 | DF | (India) Laldanmawia | (India) Hyderabad | Loan return |
| 1 June 2024 | 44 | DF | (India) Lalhrezuala Sailung | (India) Odisha | Loan return |
| 2 June 2024 | 33 | MF | (India) Subhanil Ghosh | (India) Peerless SC | |
| 24 June 2024 | 07 | MF | (India) R. Lalthanmawia | (India) Kerala Blasters | |
| 27 June 2024 | 20 | GK | (India) Nora Fernandes | (India) Kerala Blasters | |
| 15 July 2024 | 17 | MF | (India) KC Larchhuakmawia | (India) Kerala United FC | |
| 29 July 2024 | 33 | DF | (Serbia) Ivan Marić | (Indonesia) Adhyaksa | |
| 16 August 2024 | 05 | MF | (Brazil) Gustavo | (Thailand) Kamphaengphet | |
| 21 August 2024 | 09 | FW | (India) Tharpuia | (India) Gokulam Kerala | |
| 25 August 2024 | 14 | DF | (India) Joe Zoherliana | (India) Mohammedan SC | |
| 29 August 2024 | | MF | (Poland) Rafał Zaborowski | (Poland) Szczakowianka Jaworzno | |
| 6 September 2024 | 10 | MF | (India) K Lalrinfela | (India) Mohammedan SC | |
