= Augustine Lalrochana =

Indian footballer

Personal information
- Full name: Augustine Lalrochana
- Date of birth: 8 August 2004 (age 22)
- Place of birth: Vairengte, Mizoram, India
- Position: Forward

Team information
- Current team: SC Delhi
- Number: 19

Youth career
- Aizawl Academy
- Chhinga Veng
- Bethlehem Vengthlang
- 2022–2023: Aizawl Reserve

Senior career*
Years	Team	Apps	(Gls)
2023–2025	Aizawl	23	(1)
2025–	SC Delhi	2	(1)
- * Club domestic league appearances and goals as of 21 February 2026

Augustine Lalrochana (born 8 August 2004) is an Indian professional footballer who plays as a forward for Indian Super League club SC Delhi.

== Career ==
Lalrochana stated playing at the Aizawl FC Academy in Mizoram. After graduating from Aizawl FC he played for Chhinga Veng and then Bethlehem Vengthlang FC. During that period, he also represented Mizoram, at the Khelo India Youth Games, where the team won the gold medal. In 2023, he signed for Aizawl FC of the second-tier I-League. He played three seasons for Aizawl from 2022 to 2025. On 18 January 2025, he scored his first goal of his professional career in a 4–3 victory against Inter Kashi during the 2024–25 I-League.

In 2025, Lalrochana signed for then ISL club Hyderabad FC, now rebranded as SC Delhi. On 27 November 2025, he made his debut for the club in the 2025 AIFF Super Cup in a 1–4 defeat against Mumbai City FC. On 17 February 2026, he made his debut in the ISL, the top-tier league of India. On 21 February 2026, he scored his first goal in the ISL in a 1–4 defeat to East Bengal.

== Career statistics ==
=== Club ===
As of 21 February 2026

Club	Season	League			Cup		Other		AFC		Total	
Club	Season	Division	Apps	Goals	Apps	Goals	Apps	Goals	Apps	Goals	Apps	Goals
Aizawl	2022–23	I-League	—		3 (Note: Appearance(s) in Super Cup)	0	—		—		3	0
Aizawl	2023–24	I-League	5	0	—		—		—		5	0
Aizawl	2024–25	I-League	18	1	—		—		—		18	1
Aizawl	Total		23	1	3	0	0	0	0	0	26	1
SC Delhi	2025–26	Indian Super League	2	1	3	0	—		—		5	1
SC Delhi	Total		2	1	3	0	0	0	0	0	5	1
Career total			25	2	6	0	0	0	0	0	31	2
