= Lalchungnunga =

Indian footballer (born 2000)

Lal Chungnunga
Personal information
- Date of birth: 25 December 2000 (age 25)
- Place of birth: Aizawl, Mizoram, India
- Height: 1.83 m (6 ft 0 in)
- Positions: Centre-back; left-back

Team information
- Current team: East Bengal
- Number: 5

Youth career
- 2019: Aizawl

Senior career*
Years	Team	Apps	(Gls)
2019–2021	Aizawl	4	(0)
2021–2022	Sreenidi Deccan	17	(1)
2022–2023	→ East Bengal (loan)	19	(0)
2023–	East Bengal	39	(2)

International career^{‡}
2023–2024	India U23	3	(0)
2023	India	1	(0)
- * Club domestic league appearances and goals as of 21:33, 5 March 2026 (UTC) ‡ National team caps and goals as of 15:12, 22 November 2023 (UTC)

Lalchungnunga (born 25 December 2000) is an Indian professional footballer who plays as a defender for Indian Super League club East Bengal.

== Club career ==
=== Aizawl ===
Lalchungnunga joined Aizawl on 1 July 2019 from their U18 club. He made his first appearance on 30 January 2021, against NEROCA. He played four matches for the club in 2020–21.

=== Sreenidi Deccan ===
In August 2021, Sreenidi Deccan roped in Lalchungnunga, on a two-year deal with an option to extend by another year. On 27 December 2021, he made his debut for the club against NEROCA, in a 3–2 loss.

=== East Bengal ===
In August 2022, Indian Super League club East Bengal announced the signing of Lalchungnunga, on loan from I-League club Sreenidi Deccan. On 22 August, he made his debut against Indian Navy in the Durand Cup, which ended in a 0–0 stalemate. Lalchungnunga made his league debut for East Bengal on 7 October against Kerala Blasters in a 1–3 defeat. On 25 December 2022, East Bengal announced that Lalchungnunga has signed permanently for the club, effective from 1 June 2023, until 2026.

In the 2023–24 season, Lalchungnunga led the East Bengal defence to the Durand Cup final where they finished runners-up, and was part of the 2024 Indian Super Cup winning team as he came on as a substitute in the final against Odisha as East Bengal became champions at the Kalinga Stadium.

== International career ==
Lalchungnunga was selected in the India U23 squad for the 2022 Asian Games and played three matches as India got knocked out in the Round of 16 against Saudi Arabia.

On 21 November 2023, Lalchungnunga made his senior international debut when he came on as a substitution for Sandesh Jhingan in the 91st minute against Qatar in the 2026 FIFA World Cup qualification – AFC second round match at the Kalinga Stadium in Bhubaneshwar.

== Career statistics ==
=== Club ===
As of 16 August 2026

Club	Season	League			National Cup (Note: Includes Super Cup)		AFC		Others (Note: Includes Durand Cup)		Total	
Club	Season	Division	Apps	Goals	Apps	Goals	Apps	Goals	Apps	Goals	Apps	Goals
Aizawl	2019–20	I-League	0	0	0	0	–		–		0	0
Aizawl	2020–21	I-League	4	0	0	0	–		–		4	0
Aizawl	Total		4	0	0	0	0	0	0	0	4	0
Sreenidi Deccan	2021–22	I-League	17	1	0	0	–		–		17	1
East Bengal (loan)	2022–23	Indian Super League	19	0	3 (Note: Appearance(s) in the Super Cup)	0	–		4	0	26	0
East Bengal	2023–24	Indian Super League	17	0	1	0	–		6	0	24	0
East Bengal	2024–25	Indian Super League	18	2	1	0	6 (Note: One appearance(s) in AFC Champions League Two and Five appearance(s) in AFC Challenge League)	0	3	0	28	2
East Bengal	2025–26	Indian Super League	7	0	4	0	–		7 (Note: Four appearance(s) in the Durand Cup and Three appearance(s) in the IFA Shield)	1	18	1
East Bengal	2026–27	Indian Super League	0	0	0	0	0	0	3 (Note: Three appearance(s) in the Durand Cup.)	0	3	0
East Bengal	Total		61	2	9	0	6	0	23	1	99	3
Career total			82	3	9	0	6	0	23	1	120	4

== Honours ==
East Bengal

- Indian Super League: 2025-26
- Super Cup: 2024
