= Joseph Sunny =

Indian footballer (born 2003)

Personal information
- Date of birth: 13 October 2003 (age 23)
- Place of birth: Kerala, India
- Position: Forward

Team information
- Current team: SC Delhi
- Number: 23

Youth career
- Golden Threads
- Kerala
- 2021–2022: Hyderabad Youth

Senior career*
Years	Team	Apps	(Gls)
2022–2023	Hyderabad B	6	(0)
2023–2025	Hyderabad	23	(2)
2025–	SC Delhi	5	(2)

International career^{‡}
2025–	India U23	1	(0)
- * Club domestic league appearances and goals as of 22:00, 22 May 2025 (UTC) ‡ National team caps and goals as of 22:00, 21 June 2025 (UTC)

Joseph Sunny (born 13 October 2003) is an Indian professional footballer who plays as a forward for Indian Super League club SC Delhi.

== Club career ==
Sunny started playing football with Golden Threads, a football club based in Kochi, Kerala. Then he moved to FC Kerala before joing Hyderabad FC. He represented Hyderabad youth team at the RD Development League for 2021–22 season. He played six matches and scored a goal. He also represented Calicut University, his alma mater.

=== Hyderabad ===
In 2022, he was promoted to the reserve team of Hyderabad (as Hyderabad B). He played the 2022–23 season for Hyderabad B at the 2022–23 I-League 2nd Division, the third-tier league of Indian football. For 2023–24 season, he was promoted to the main team and made his debut at the Indian Super League (ISL), the top-tier league of Indian football. He played eleven matches in this season. In the next season he played 13 matches for Hyderabad and scored twice. His first goal in ISL came in a 3–1 victory against Mohammedan on 8 February 2025.

== International ==
In May 2025, India under-23 head coach Naushad Moosa listed Sunny in the 29-members probable squad for two friendlies that will be held in Tajikistan in June 2025.

== Career statistics ==
=== Club ===
As of 22 May 2025

Club	Season	League			Cup		AFC		Total	
Club	Season	Division	Apps	Goals	Apps	Goals	Apps	Goals	Apps	Goals
Hyderabad B	2022–23	I-League 2	6	0	0	0	–		–	
Hyderabad B	Total		6	0	0	0	–		6	0
Hyderabad	2023–24	Indian Super League	10	0	1 (Note: Appearance(s) in Super Cup)	0	–		11	0
Hyderabad	2024–25	Indian Super League	13	2	0	0	–		13	2
Hyderabad	Total		23	2	1	0	0	0	24	2
Career total			29	2	1	0	0	0	30	2
