= Hardik Bhatt =

Indian football player

Personal information
- Date of birth: 17 April 1997 (age 29)
- Place of birth: Mumbai, Maharashtra, India
- Position: Right back

Team information
- Current team: East Bengal

Youth career
- ARA

Senior career*
Years	Team	Apps	(Gls)
2018–2019	ARA	1	(0)
2019–2020	Bengaluru United	8	(2)
2021–2022	Hyderya Sports	0	(0)
2022–2024	Rajasthan United	27	(0)
2023	→ Mumbai City (loan)	0	(0)
2024–2025	Mumbai City	1	(0)
2025	→ Sreenidi Deccan (loan)	9	(0)
2025–2026	Sreenidi Deccan	12	(0)
2026–	East Bengal	0	(0)
- * Club domestic league appearances and goals as of 7:00, 10 May 2026 (UTC)

Hardik Bhatt (born 17 April 1997) is an Indian professional footballer who plays as a defender for Indian Super League club East Bengal.

== Career ==
Bhatt started his career with ARA. In 2019, he signed for Bengaluru United. On 30 January 2023, he signed for Mumbai City on a six-month loan deal. He was mainly used as a reserve player by head coach Des Buckingham. He made his only appearance during his loan spell on 19 February 2023, starting in the last league game of the season where a heavily rotated Mumbai team lost 0-1 to East Bengal at home. With this loan spell, he won the first ISL League Shield of his career.

On 17 July 2024, following the expiry of his Rajasthan United FC contract, he returned to Mumbai City on a one-year contract until the end of the 2024-25 season. He made his second debut for the club at home against NorthEast United FC on 30 December 2024, playing the full 90 minutes in an eventual 0-3 loss for the club.

On 15 Jan 2025, Hardik joined I-League club Sreenidi Deccan FC on loan until the end of the season.

== Honours ==
Mumbai City

- Indian Super League (Premiership): 2022–23
