= Birsa Munda Football Stadium =

Stadium in India

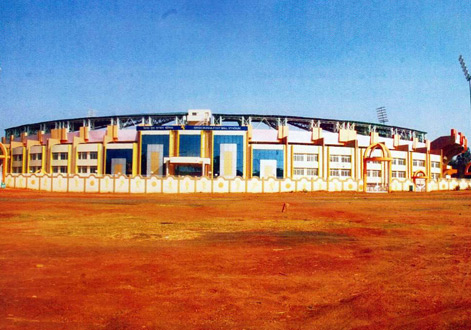
- Interactive map of Birsa Munda Football Stadium
- Location: Ranchi, Jharkhand, India
- Owner: Government of Jharkhand
- Operator: Jharkhand Football Association
- Capacity: 40,000
- Surface: Grass
- Scoreboard: Yes

Construction
- Opened: 2009

Tenant
- Inter Kashi FC

The Birsa Munda Football Stadium is a stadium in Ranchi, India. Opened in 2009, it can host 40,000 spectators. It is the home venue of Jharkhand football team and Jharkhand women's football team.

== Tournaments hosted ==
- Durand Cup
  - 2026 Durand Cup
