= Central Industrial Security Force football team =

Indian association football club

CISF Protectors
- Full name: Central Industrial Security Force football team
- Nickname: The Protectors
- Short name: CISF
- Ground: Ambedkar Stadium
- Capacity: 30,000
- Owner: Central Industrial Security Force
- Head coach: Shehzad Khan
- League: Delhi Premier League
- Website: CISF.in
Home colours	Away colours	Third colours

Central Industrial Security Force football team, also known as CISF or CISF Protectors football team, is the football section representing the Central Industrial Security Force. The team regularly participates in the Durand Cup, Delhi Premier League and various regional tournaments.

== Honours ==
=== League ===
- Delhi Premier League
  - Champions (1): 2024–25
- Delhi Senior Division League
  - Champions (1): 2022–23
- Delhi A-Division League
  - Champions (1): 2021–22

=== Cup ===
- All India Police Games
  - Champions (2): 2025, 2026

== See also ==
- Army Red
- Army Green
- Indian Air Force
- Indian Navy
- Services football team
- Railways football team
- Assam Rifles
- Punjab Police FC
- Border Security Force FC
- Central Reserve Police Force SC
- List of football clubs in India
- Indian Army Service Corps
