= Raynier Fernandes =

Indian footballer (born 1996)

Personal information
- Full name: Raynier Raymond Fernandes
- Date of birth: 19 February 1996 (age 30)
- Place of birth: Mumbai, India
- Height: 1.74 m (5 ft 9 in)
- Position: Central midfielder

Team information
- Current team: East Bengal

Youth career
- 2014–2016: Air India
- 2016: Maharashtra

Senior career*
| Years | Team | Apps | (Gls) |
| 2016–2018 | Mohun Bagan | 19 | (0) |
| 2018–2023 | Mumbai City | 70 | (3) |
| 2022–2023 | → Odisha (loan) | 20 | (0) |
| 2023–2026 | Goa | 30 | (0) |
| 2024–2025 | → Odisha (loan) | 16 | (0) |
| 2026 | Jamshedpur | 0 | (0) |
| 2026– | East Bengal | 0 | (0) |

International career^{‡}
| 2019–2021 | India | 5 | (0) |
- * Club domestic league appearances and goals as of 21:57, 9 May 2026 (UTC) ‡ National team caps and goals as of 7 June 2024

Raynier Raymond Fernandes (born 19 February 1996) is an Indian professional footballer who plays as a central midfielder for Indian Super League club East Bengal.

== Career ==
Born in Mumbai, Fernandes began his career with Air India. He stayed with the club, playing in the MDFA Elite Division, until 2016. He also represented Maharashtra in the Santosh Trophy in 2016.

=== Mohun Bagan ===
On 5 August 2016 it was announced that Fernandes had signed with Mohun Bagan of the I-League. He made his debut for the first-team of Mohun Bagan not long after signing on 10 August in their Calcutta Football League opener against George Telegraph. He then made his professional debut for the club in the I-League on 13 January 2017 against Shillong Lajong. He started and played 69 minutes as Mohun Bagan won 2–0.

=== Odisha ===
In June 2022, Fernandes moved to Odisha on loan from fellow Indian Super League club Mumbai City. On 17 August, he made his debut for the club against NorthEast United in the Durand Cup, in a thumping 6–0 win.

== International career ==
On 5 June 2019, he made his senior international debut for India in a 3–1 defeat against Curaçao at the 2019 King's Cup in Thailand.

== Career statistics ==
=== Club ===
As of 21 April 2025

| Club | Season | League | | | National Cup | | Continental | | Other | | Total | |
| Club | Season | Division | Apps | Goals | Apps | Goals | Apps | Goals | Apps | Goals | Apps | Goals |
|---|---|---|---|---|---|---|---|---|---|---|---|---|
| Mohun Bagan | 2016–17 | I-League | 2 | 0 | 5 (Note: Appearance(s) in Federation Cup) | 0 | 5 (Note: Appearance(s) in AFC Cup) | 0 | — | | 12 | 0 |
| Mohun Bagan | 2017–18 | I-League | 17 | 0 | 3 (Note: Appearance(s) in Super Cup) | 0 | — | | — | | 20 | 0 |
| Mohun Bagan | Mohun Bagan total | | 19 | 0 | 8 | 0 | 5 | 0 | | | 32 | 0 |
| Mumbai City | 2018–19 | Indian Super League | 17 | 2 | 1 | 0 | — | | — | | 18 | 2 |
| Mumbai City | 2019–20 | Indian Super League | 16 | 1 | — | | — | | — | | 16 | 1 |
| Mumbai City | 2020–21 | Indian Super League | 21 | 0 | — | | — | | — | | 21 | 0 |
| Mumbai City | 2021–22 | Indian Super League | 16 | 0 | — | | 5 (Note: Appearance(s) in AFC Champions League) | 0 | — | | 21 | 0 |
| Mumbai City | Mumbai City total | | 70 | 3 | 1 | 0 | 5 | 0 | | | 76 | 3 |
| Odisha (loan) | 2022–23 | Indian Super League | 20 | 0 | 2 | 0 | — | | 4 (Note: Appearance(s) in Durand Cup) | 0 | 26 | 0 |
| Goa | 2023–24 | Indian Super League | 19 | 0 | 2 | 0 | — | | 4 | 0 | 25 | 0 |
| Goa | 2025–26 | Indian Super League | 0 | 0 | 0 | 0 | — | | 0 | 0 | 0 | 0 |
| Goa | Total | | 19 | 0 | 2 | 0 | 0 | 0 | 4 | 0 | 25 | 0 |
| Odisha (loan) | 2024–25 | Indian Super League | 16 | 0 | 1 | 0 | — | | 0 | 0 | 17 | 0 |
| Career total | | | 144 | 3 | 14 | 0 | 10 | 0 | 8 | 0 | 176 | 3 |

=== International ===
As of match played till 29 March 2021

| National team | Year | Apps | Goals |
|---|---|---|---|
| India | 2019 | 3 | 0 |
| India | 2021 | 2 | 0 |
| Total | | 5 | 0 |

== Honours ==
Mumbai City

- Indian Super League: 2020–21
- Indian Super League premiership: 2020–21

Odisha

- Indian Super Cup: 2023
