= Alberto Rodríguez (footballer, born 1992) =

Spanish footballer

Personal information
- Full name: Alberto Rodríguez Martín
- Date of birth: 31 December 1992 (age 33)
- Place of birth: Las Palmas, Spain
- Height: 1.91 m (6 ft 3 in)
- Position: Centre-back

Team information
- Current team: Mohun Bagan
- Number: 21

Youth career
- Santidad Banot
- Universidad Las Palmas
- –2011: Arucas

Senior career*
Years	Team	Apps	(Gls)
2011–2016	Arucas		
2016–2017	Villarrubia	32	(0)
2017–2021	Tamaraceite	100	(9)
2021–2023	Lugo	51	(4)
2023–2024	Persib Bandung	33	(0)
2024–	Mohun Bagan	37	(6)
- * Club domestic league appearances and goals as of 15:48, 5 November 2026 (UTC)

Alberto Rodríguez Martín (born 31 December 1992) is a Spanish professional footballer who plays as a defender for Indian Super League club Mohun Bagan.

== Club career ==
Born in Las Palmas, Canary Islands, Alberto played as a youth for Santidad Banot, Universidad Las Palmas and Arucas, and made his senior debut with the latter in the 2011–12 campaign in the Primera Regional. He helped the club to achieve two promotions before signing for Tercera División side Villarrubia in August 2016.

In June 2017, Alberto returned to his native region after joining Tamaraceite in the Interinsular Preferente. He achieved promotion to the fourth tier in his first season, and was also a regular starter as his side promoted to the Segunda División B for the first time ever in 2020.

On 9 July 2021, Alberto went on a trial at Segunda División side Lugo. Late in the month, he signed a one-year contract with the club. He made his club debut on 2 December, starting in a 2–2 draw at Unión Adarve in the season's Copa del Rey, as his side won 4–3 on penalties.

made his professional debut on 5 December 2021 at the age of 28, coming on as a second-half substitute for Carlos Pita in a 0–0 home draw against Ibiza. He scored his first professional goal the following 19 March, netting the opener in a 1–1 home draw against Real Oviedo.

=== Persib Bandung ===
Alberto had a short stint for the Indonesian Liga 1 club, and on 2 July 2023 made his debut in a 1-1 draw against Madura United. Alberto became an important player behind Persib Bandung's 2023–24 Liga 1 title.

=== Mohun Bagan ===
Alberto made his debut for the club in the Indian Super League in September 2024. He scored his first goal for the Mariners against Mumbai City. Later, in a match against Kerala Blasters, he scored a stunner from 25 yards out in the dying moments of the game to clinch victory for his side by 3-2. He scored a brace against Punjab FC and was named the player of the match. Alberto became the most important player for the club. He won the Indian Super League Shield & the Indian Super League Cup in his debut season for Mohun Bagan.

In his next season on 18 October 2025 he won the IFA Shield by defeating his clubs arch city rivals East Bengal in the final.

On 6 March 2026 he scored his first goal in 2025-26 ISL season against Odisha FC and his team won the match by 5-1.

== Honours ==
Persib Bandung

- Liga 1: 2023–24

Mohun Bagan

- Indian Super League Shield: 2024–25
- Indian Super League Cup: 2024–25
- IFA Shield: 2025, 2026

Individual

- Liga 1 Team of the Season:2023–24
- Indian Super League Team of the Season:2024–25
