= Rodriguinho (footballer, born 2001) =

Brazilian footballer

Personal information
- Full name: Rodrigo Araújo da Silva Filho
- Date of birth: 17 April 2001 (age 25)
- Place of birth: Belo Horizonte, Brazil
- Height: 1.79 m (5 ft 10 in)
- Position: Forward

Team information
- Current team: Delhi
- Number: 7

Youth career
- 2011–2019: Atlético Mineiro
- 2019–2020: Avaí
- 2021: Chapecoense

Senior career*
Years	Team	Apps	(Gls)
2022–2024	Chapecoense	23	(3)
2022	→ Joinville (loan)	9	(2)
2023	→ CSA (loan)	9	(1)
2023	→ Concórdia (loan)	13	(5)
2024	Chiangrai United	19	(3)
2024–2025	Confiança	9	(4)
2025	Ethnikos	14	(2)
2025–2026	Lagarto	10	(4)
2026	Ponte Preta	9	(0)
2026–	Delhi	3	(1)
- * Club domestic league appearances and goals as of 28 October 2026

Rodrigo Araújo da Silva Filho (born 17 April 2001), commonly known as Rodriguinho, is a Brazilian professional footballer who plays as a forward for Indian Super League club Delhi.

== Club career ==
Born in Belo Horizonte, Minas Gerais, Rodriguinho joined Atlético Mineiro's youth setup at the age of ten. He left the club in 2019 to join Avaí, and moved to Chapecoense ahead of the 2021 season.

After impressing with the under-20s, Rodriguinho made his first team – and Série A – debut on 3 October 2021, coming on as a half-time substitute for Anselmo Ramon in a 1–1 home draw against São Paulo. He scored his first professional goal thirteen days later, netting the equalizer in a 1–2 home loss against Fortaleza.

== Career statistics ==
As of 25 October 2021

Club	Season	League			State League		Cup		Continental		Other		Total	
Club	Season	Division	Apps	Goals	Apps	Goals	Apps	Goals	Apps	Goals	Apps	Goals	Apps	Goals
Chapecoense	2021	Série A	5	1	0	0	0	0	—		—		5	1
Career total			5	1	0	0	0	0	0	0	0	0	5	1
