= Ethyan González =

Spanish footballer

Ethyan
Personal information
- Full name: Etyan Jesús González Morales
- Date of birth: 6 June 2002 (age 24)
- Place of birth: Santa Cruz de Tenerife, Spain
- Height: 1.85 m (6 ft 1 in)
- Position: Forward

Team information
- Current team: NorthEast United
- Number: 9

Youth career
- –2014: Cruz Santa
- 2014–2021: Tenerife

Senior career*
Years	Team	Apps	(Gls)
2021–2025	Tenerife B	74	(38)
2021–2025	Tenerife	12	(0)
2022–2023	→ Atlético Madrid B (loan)	30	(5)
2025	Torreense	15	(4)
2025–2026	Muaither	12	(4)
2026–	NorthEast United	5	(0)
- * Club domestic league appearances and goals as of 5 November 2026

Ethyan Jesús González Morales (born 6 June 2002), simply known as Ethyan, is a Spanish professional footballer who plays as a forward for Indian Super League club NorthEast United.

== Club career ==
Born in Santa Cruz de Tenerife, Canary Islands, Ethyan joined CD Tenerife's youth setup in 2014, from UD Cruz Santa. He made his senior debut with the reserves on 17 February 2021, coming on as a second-half substitute in a 1–1 Tercera División away draw against CD Buzanada.

Ethyan scored his first senior goals on 20 February 2021, netting a brace for the B's in a 3–4 home loss against CD Vera. On 7 March, he scored four goals in a 5–1 home routing of Buzanada, and ended the campaign with 14 goals in only 16 appearances for the side as they missed out promotion in the play-offs.

Ethyan made his first-team debut on 15 August 2021, replacing Álex Bermejo late into a 2–1 away win against CF Fuenlabrada, in the Segunda División championship. On 1 September of the following year, he was loaned to Segunda Federación side Atlético Madrid B, for one year.

On 4 February 2025, Ethyan signed a two-and-a-half-year contract with Torreense in Portugal.

On 20 July 2026, Ethyan signed for Indian Super League club NorthEast United.
