= 2025–26 Mohun Bagan Super Giant season =

136th football season of Mohun Bagan

Mohun Bagan Super Giant
2025–26 season
- Head coach: José Francisco Molina (until 26 November); Sergio Lobera (from 26 November)
- Stadium: Salt Lake Stadium; Mohun Bagan Ground
- Indian Super League: 2nd
- ACL Two: Group Stage
- Durand Cup: Quarter-finals
- Calcutta Football League: Group Stage
- IFA Shield: Champions
- AIFF Super Cup: Group Stage
- Top goalscorer: League: Jamie Maclaren ( 10 goals); All: Jamie Maclaren ( 15 goals)
- Highest home attendance: 62,201 vs East Bengal FC; ISL (17th May,2026)
- Average home league attendance: 25,533
- Biggest win: 5–1 vs Diamond Harbour FC (Durand Cup); 5–1 vs Gokulam Kerala FC (IFA Shield); 5–1 vs Mohammedan SC (ISL); 5–1 vs Odisha FC (ISL)
- Biggest defeat: 2–3 vs East Bengal FC (Calcutta Football League)
Home colours	Away colours
- All statistics correct as of 21 May 2026.

The 2025–26 Mohun Bagan Super Giant season is the club's 136th year of existence and 30th consecutive year in the top tier national league of India, since the inception of national league in 1996. The 2025–26 season will run from 1st July 2025 until 31st May 2026 and it will be the club's 6th season in ISL.

In the previous season, the Mariners won the Indian Super League double, becoming the second team after Mumbai City FC to do so, and they were runners up in Durand Cup.

== Team management ==
=== Current Technical Staff ===
Position	Name
Head coach	(Spain) Sergio Lobera
Assistant coach	(Serbia) Igor Taševski
Assistant coach	(India) Bastob Roy
Goalkeeping coach	(Spain) Francisco J. Martinez
Fitness coach	(Spain) Sergio Garcia Toribo
Team Doctor	(India) Nelson Pinto
Team Manager	(India) Abhishek Bhattacharjee
Physiotherapist	(India) Abhinandan Chatterjee
Physiotherapist	(India) Kaushik Bhuiya
Youth/Reserve team Head coach	(India) Deggie Cardozo

== Squad ==
As of 21 May 2026

First team players
No.	Name	Position	Nat	Date of Birth (Age)	Date signed	Contract end	App	Goals	Assists	Transfer notes
Goalkeepers
1	Vishal Kaith	GK	(India)	22 July 1996 (age 30)	8 July 2022	2029	122	0	0	Signed from Chennaiyin FC
24	Syed Zahid	GK	(India)	16 April 2003 (age 23)	1 September 2023	2027	7	0	0	Signed from Indian Arrows
Defenders
4	Amey Ranawade	RB	(India)	7 March 1998 (age 28)	2 July 2024	2026	14 (Note: Has Previously played for Mohun Bagan(2018-19))	0	0	Signed from Kerala Blasters
5	Tom Aldred	CB	(Scotland)	11 September 1990 (age 36)	2 July 2024	2026	54	4	1	Signed from Brisbane Roar
15	Subhasish Bose (Captain)	CB / LB	(India)	15 August 1995 (age 31)	13 August 2020	2027	186 (Note: Has Previously played for Mohun Bagan(2016-17))	11	9	Signed from Mumbai City
21	Alberto Rodríguez	CB	(Spain)	31 December 1992 (age 33)	5 July 2024	2026	45	7	1	Signed from Persib Bandung
27	Abhishek Tekcham Singh	LB/RB	(India)	2 January 2005 (age 21)	24 July 2025	2028	21	0	2	Signed From Punjab FC
32	Dippendu Biswas	CB / RB	(India)	24 April 2003 (age 23)	1 January 2024	2027	41	2	3	Youth system
44	Asish Rai	RB / RM	(India)	27 January 1999 (age 27)	20 June 2022	2027	98	2	8	Signed from Hyderabad FC
53	Leewan Castanha	RB / RM	(India)	15 April 2003 (age 23)	12 June 2024	2026	19	0	0	Youth system
55	Mehtab Singh	CB / RB	(India)	5 June 1998 (age 28)	23 August 2025	2030	16	0	0	Signed from Mumbai City
77	Thangjam Roshan Singh	LB	(India)	2 January 2007 (age 19)	1 June 2025	2027	8	0	1	Youth system
Midfielders
6	Anirudh Thapa	DM / CM	(India)	15 January 1998 (age 28)	23 June 2023	2028	79	6	5	Signed from Chennaiyin FC
9	Dimitri Petratos	AM / SS	(Australia)	10 November 1992 (age 33)	18 July 2022	2026	107	36	24	Signed from Al Wehda FC
16	Abhishek Suryavanshi	CM	(India)	12 March 2001 (age 25)	14 August 2021	2027	65	0	0	Youth system
18	Sahal Abdul Samad	AM	(India)	1 April 1997 (age 29)	14 July 2023	2028	71	8	14	Signed from Kerala Blasters
22	Deepak Tangri	CB / DM / CM	(India)	1 February 1999 (age 27)	29 June 2021	2026	104	2	2	Signed from Chennaiyin FC
25	Kiyan Nassiri	AM	(India)	17 November 2000 (age 25)	4 July 2025	2028	88 (Note: Has Previously played for Mohun Bagan (2019-2024))	12	3	Signed from Chennaiyin FC
33	Glan Martins	DM / CM	(India)	1 July 1994 (age 32)	23 January 2023	2026	41	0	0	Signed from FC Goa
45	Apuia	DM / CM	(India)	7 October 2000 (age 26)	25 June 2024	2029	45	2	0	Signed from Mumbai City
81	Thumsol Tongsin	CM	(India)	28 February 2005 (age 21)	2023	2027	19	1	4	Youth system
Attackers
7	Liston Colaco	ST / LM / LW	(India)	12 November 1998 (age 27)	9 June 2021	2027	147	34	29	Signed from Hyderabad FC
10	Robinho	AM / LW	(Brazil)	21 July 1995 (age 31)	30 August 2025	2027	17	4	3	Signed from Água Santa
11	Manvir Singh	ST /RW/ RM	(India)	6 November 1995 (age 30)	25 August 2020	2027	164	33	28	Signed from FC Goa
23	Pasang Dorjee Tamang	ST	(India)	14 June 2004 (age 22)	10 January 2025	2026	11	3	1	Youth system
29	Jamie Maclaren	ST	(Australia)	29 July 1993 (age 33)	22 July 2024	2028	47	27	3	Signed from Melbourne City
35	Jason Cummings	ST/SS	(Australia)	1 August 1995 (age 31)	1 July 2023	2026	89	34	12	Signed from Central Coast Mariners FC
72	Suhail Bhat	ST	(India)	8 April 2005 (age 21)	1 June 2023	2028	54	21	0	Youth system
98	Karan Rai	ST	(India)	11 August 1999 (age 27)	20 June 2025	2025	10	5	1	Youth system
Players who left mid -season
71	Salahudheen Adnan	RW	(India)	26 May 2001 (age 25)	12 June 2024	2026	19	6	2	Muthoot FA

== Transfers ==
=== Contract Extension ===
Position	Name	Year
Centre Back	(Scotland) Tom Aldred	2026
Striker	(India) Suhail Bhat	2028

=== In ===
No.	Pos.	Name	Signed From	Fee	Date	Ref
17	AM	(India) Kiyan Nassiri	(India) Chennaiyin FC	30L	4 July 2025	
27	LB	(India) Abhishek Singh Tekcham	(India) Punjab FC	1.8 Cr	24 July 2025	
55	CB	(India) Mehtab Singh	(India) Mumbai City	Undisclosed Fee	23 August 2025	
10	FW	(Brazil) Robinho	(Brazil) Água Santa	Free Transfer	30 August 2025	
4	RB	(India) Amey Ranawade	(India) Kerala Blasters	Loan Transfer	8 February 2026	
▼ Spending: ₹2.1 crore (US$220,000)

=== Out ===
Exit Date	No.	Pos.	Name	Signed to	Fee	Ref
14 June 2025	31	GK	(India) Arsh Anwer Shaikh	(India) Kerala Blasters FC	Free Transfer	
1 July 2026	63	CB	(India) Saurabh Bhanwala	(India) Odisha FC	Free Transfer	
24 July 2025	36	CB/LB	(India) Amandeep Vrish Bhan	(India) Mumbai City FC	Free Transfer	
25 August 2025	66	CM	(India) Sibajit Singh	(India) Gokulam Kerala FC	Free Transfer	
24 September 2025	4	CB	(Portugal) Nuno Reis	(Portugal) União de Santarém	Free Transfer	
3 October 2025	19	LW	(India) Ashique Kuruniyan	(India) Bengaluru FC	Free Transfer	
29 November 2025	10	AM	(Scotland) Greg Stewart	(Scotland) Cove Rangers	Free Transfer	
3 February 2026	71	RW	(India) Salahudheen Adnan	(India) Kerala Blasters	Free Transfer	
▲ Income: ₹0

== Friendlies (Senior Team) ==
Mohun Bagan played against FC Goa in a friendly at Kolkata on Sept 9, ahead of their AFC Champions League Two Campaign.

9 September 2025	Mohun Bagan	0–0	FC Goa	Kolkata
10:00 IST				Stadium: Kishore Bharati Krirangan

Mohun Bagan played a friendly match against Diamond Harbour FC on 19th December, 2025 under new coach Sergio Lobera.

19 December 2025	Mohun Bagan	6–2	Diamond Harbour	Kolkata
18:30 IST	Maclaren; Cummings; Manvir; Liston Colaco			Stadium: Kishore Bharati Krirangan

== Competitions (Senior Team) ==
=== Overview ===
Competition	First match (round)	Latest match (round)	Final position
Durand Cup	31 July; Group stage	17 August; Quarter Finals	Quarter Finals
AFC Champions League Two	16 September; Matchday 1		Withdrawn
IFA Shield	9 October; Matchday 1	18 October; Final	Champions
Super Cup	25 October; Group Stage	31 October; Group Stage	Group Stage
Indian Super League	14 February; Matchday 1	21 May; Matchday 13	Runners up

Competition	Record							
Competition	Pld	W	D	L	GF	GA	GD	Win %
Durand Cup	4	3	0	1	13	4	+9	75.00
AFC Champions League Two	1	0	0	1	0	1	−1	0.00
IFA Shield	3	3	0	0	8	2	+6	100.00
Super Cup	3	1	2	0	2	0	+2	33.33
Indian Super League	13	7	5	1	23	9	+14	53.85
Total	24	14	7	3	46	16	+30	58.33

Last updated: complete
Source: Competitions

== Matches ==
=== Durand Cup ===
Group stage

Pos	Team	Pld	W	D	L	GF	GA	GD	Pts	Qualification	MBG	DIH	MSC	BSF
1	Mohun Bagan (H)	3	3	0	0	12	2	+10	9	knockout stage		5–1	3–1	4–0
2	Diamond Harbour	3	2	0	1	11	7	+4	6	knockout stage			2–1	8–1
3	Mohammedan (H)	3	1	0	2	5	5	0	3					3–0
4	Border Security Force	3	0	0	3	1	15	−14	0					

Source: DFTS
Legend: Blue = home team win; Yellow = draw; Red = away team win.
Rules for classification: Group stage tiebreakers
(H) Hosts

31 July 2025 Group stage	Mohun Bagan	3–1	Mohammedan	Kolkata, India
19:00 IST	Liston Colaco 23', 90+6' (pen.); Asish Rai (yellow card) 37'; Apuia (red card) 43'; Dippendu Biswas (yellow card) 44'; Suhail Bhat 63'	AIFF; I-League	Tangva Ragui (yellow card) 43'; Ashley Alban Koli 50'; Pukhrambam Dinesh Meitei (yellow card) 90+6'	Stadium: Vivekananda Yuba Bharati Krirangan; Attendance: 6,584; Referee: Aditya Purkayastha; Man of the Match: Liston Colaco (Mohun Bagan SG)

4 August 2025 Group stage	Mohun Bagan	4–0	BSF	Kolkata, India
19:00 IST	Manvir Singh 24'; Liston Colaco 53', 58'; Sahal Abdul Samad 61'; Dippendu Biswas (yellow card) 88'	AIFF; I-League	Mohammed Asif Khan (yellow card) 87'	Stadium: Kishore Bharati Krirangan; Attendance: 3,121; Referee: Ashwin; Man of the Match: Liston Colaco (Mohun Bagan SG)

9 August 2025 Group stage	Diamond Harbour	1–5	Mohun Bagan	Kolkata, West Bengal
19:00 IST	Majcen 24'; Melroy Melwin Assisi (yellow card) 40'; Paul Ramfangzauva (yellow card) 45'; Naresh Singh Y (red card) 50'; Lalliansanga Renthlei (yellow card) 90+2'	AIFF; I-League	Thapa 19'; Maclaren 35'; Apuia (yellow card) 38'; Liston 51' (pen.); Sahal 64'; Cummings 80'	Stadium: Vivekananda Yuba Bharati Krirangan; Attendance: 8,592; Referee: Ashwin; Man of the Match: Liston Colaco (Mohun Bagan SG)

Knockout stage

Quarter-finals
16 Aug – Shillong
Shillong Lajong	2
Indian Navy	1
16 Aug – Kokrajhar
Bodoland	0
NorthEast United	4
17 Aug – Jamshedpur
Jamshedpur	0
Diamond Harbour	2
17 Aug – Kolkata
East Bengal	2
Mohun Bagan	1

Semi-finals
19 Aug – Shillong
Shillong Lajong	0
NorthEast United	1
20 Aug – Kolkata
Diamond Harbour	2
East Bengal	1

Final
23 Aug – Kolkata
NorthEast United	6
Diamond Harbour	1

17 August 2025 Quarter final	Mohun Bagan	1–2	East Bengal	Kolkata, West Bengal
19:00 IST	Apuia (yellow card) 45+3'; Anirudh Thapa 68'; Deepak Tangri (yellow card) 90+4'; Dimi Petratos (yellow card) 90+4'	AIFF; I-League	Dimitrios Diamantakos 38' (pen.), 52', (yellow card) 52'; Saúl Crespo (yellow card) 45+3'; Miguel Figueira (yellow card) 45+2'; Mohammad Rakip (yellow card) 71'	Stadium: Vivekananda Yuba Bharati Krirangan; Attendance: 58,676; Referee: R. Venkatesh; Man of the Match: Dimitrios Diamantakos (Emami East Bengal)

=== AFC Champions League Two ===
Group stage
(Group C)

Pos	Team	Pld	W	D	L	GF	GA	GD	Pts	Qualification	ALH	SEP	AHA	MBG
1	(Jordan) Al-Hussein	4	3	0	1	8	4	+4	9	Advance to round of 16	—	1–0	3–1	~~21 Oct~~
2	(Iran) Sepahan	4	2	1	1	5	3	+2	7	Advance to round of 16	2–0	—	2–2	~~30 Sep~~
3	(Turkmenistan) Ahal	4	0	1	3	4	10	−6	1		1–4	0–1	—	~~25 Nov~~
4	(India) Mohun Bagan	0	0	0	0	0	0	0	0	Withdrew (Note: On 27 September 2025, AFC announced that Mohun Bagan SG were considered to have withdrawn from the AFC Champions League Two after they failed to travel to Iran to play their fixture against Sepahan in Isfahan, citing security concerns. Their single match played, a 1–0 defeat to Ahal, was annulled and all their remaining matches were cancelled. This was the second year in a row that Mohun Bagan had been withdrawn from the competition for refusing to fulfill a fixture in Iran. In December 2025 the AFC banned them from entering the following season's AFC competitions, meaning they will not be eligible to re-enter the Champions League until the 2027–28 season)	~~4 Nov~~	~~23 Dec~~	~~0–1~~	—

Source: ACL2
Rules for classification: Tiebreakers
Notes:

16 September 2025 Group Stage	Mohun Bagan (India)	Voided (0–1)	(Turkmenistan) Ahal	Kolkata, India
19:15 UTC+5:30	Tom Aldred (yellow card) 45+1'	Report	N. Tovakelov (yellow card) 70'; Enver Annayev 83'	Stadium: Salt Lake Stadium; Attendance: 41,003; Referee: Clifford Daypuyat (Philippines)

30 September 2025 Group Stage	Sepahan (Iran)	Cancelled (Note: On 27 September 2025, AFC announced that Mohun Bagan SG were considered to have withdrawn from the AFC Champions League Two after they failed to appear for their fixture against Sepahan in Isfahan. Their single match was voided.)	(India) Mohun Bagan	Isfahan, Iran
21:30 IST		Report		Stadium: Naghsh-e-Jahan Stadium

21 October 2025 Group Stage	Al-Hussein (Jordan)	Cancelled	(India) Mohun Bagan	Amman, Jordan
23:45 IST		Report		Stadium: Amman International Stadium

4 November 2025 Group Stage	Mohun Bagan (India)	Cancelled	(Jordan) Al-Hussein	Kolkata, India
19:15 IST		Report		Stadium: Salt Lake Stadium

25 November 2025 Group Stage	Ahal (Turkmenistan)	Cancelled	(India) Mohun Bagan	Isfahan, Iran
		Report		Stadium: Naghsh-e-Jahan Stadium

23 December 2025 Group Stage	Mohun Bagan (India)	Cancelled	(Iran) Sepahan	Kolkata, India
19:15 IST		Report		Stadium: Salt Lake Stadium

=== IFA Shield ===
On 27 September, Mohun Bagan confirmed their participation in the 2025 IFA Shield and are clubbed with Gokulam Kerala FC and United SC in group B.

==== Group Stage ====
Pos	Team	Pld	W	D	L	GF	GA	GD	Pts	Qualification	MBG	USC	GOK
1	Mohun Bagan	2	2	0	0	7	1	+6	6	Advance to the Final		2–0	5–1
2	United SC	2	1	0	1	1	2	−1	3				1–0
3	Gokulam Kerala	2	0	0	2	1	6	−5	0				

Source: IFA
Legend: Blue = home team win; Yellow = draw; Red = away team win.
Rules for classification: Group stage tiebreakers

9 October 2025 1	Gokulam Kerala FC	1–5	Mohun Bagan	Kolkata
15:00 IST	Emil Benny (yellow card) 24'; Athul Unnikrishnan (yellow card) 35'; Lalengmawia Ralte 48' (o.g.)	AIFF; I-League	Rishad 11' (o.g.); Subhasish Bose (yellow card) 23'; Jamie Maclaren 27', 75'; Alberto Rodríguez 51'; Robson Robinho 54'; Lalengmawia Ralte (yellow card) 71'	Stadium: Kishore Bharati Krirangan; Attendance: 1,400; Referee: Surojit Das; Man of the Match: Jamie Maclaren (Mohun Bagan)

15 October 2025 2	Mohun Bagan	2–0	United SC	Kolkata
14:30 IST	Dimi Petratos 45'; Jason Cummings 49'	AIFF; I-League	Seila Toure (yellow card) 38'	Stadium: Kishore Bharati Krirangan; Attendance: 2,667; Referee: Mithun Kumar Kundu; Man of the Match: Robson Robinho (Mohun Bagan)

==== Final ====
18 October 2025 Final	East Bengal	1–1 (a.e.t.) (4–5 p)	Mohun Bagan	Kolkata
18:00 IST	Anwar Ali (yellow card) 4'; Hamid Ahadad 35'; Lalchungnunga (yellow card) 63'; Naorem Mahesh (yellow card) 111'	AIFF; I-League	Jason Cummings (penalty missed) 34'; Apuia 45+3'; Alberto Rodríguez (yellow card) 49'; Robson Robinho (yellow card) 91'; Subhasish Bose (yellow card) 109'	Stadium: Vivekananda Yuba Bharati Krirangan; Attendance: 50,236; Referee: Venkatesh Ramachadran; Man of the Match: Naorem Mahesh (East Bengal)
	Penalties
	(penalty scored) Miguel Figueira; (penalty scored) Kevin Sibille; (penalty scored) Naorem Mahesh; (penalty missed) Jay Gupta; (penalty scored) Hiroshi Ibusuki		(penalty scored) Robson Robinho; (penalty scored) Manvir Singh; (penalty scored) Liston Colaco; (penalty scored) Dimitri Petratos; (penalty scored) Mehtab Singh

=== AIFF Super Cup ===
2024–25 Indian Super League champions Mohun Bagan have been designated as the top-seeded team and will be placed at the top of Group A as A1, for next month’s Super Cup in Goa.
The virtual official draw ceremony of the Super Cup will be held on Sept 25 at 4pm. According to the tentative draw, Mohun Bagan will play on the opening day – October 25, and the remaining group stage games on October 28 and October 31 respectively.

Group stage

Pos	Team	Pld	W	D	L	GF	GA	GD	Pts	Qualification	EAB	MBG	DEM	CFC
1	East Bengal	3	1	2	0	6	2	+4	5	Advance to knockout stage		0–0	2–2	4–0
2	Mohun Bagan	3	1	2	0	2	0	+2	5				0–0	2–0
3	Dempo (H)	3	0	3	0	3	3	0	3					1–1
4	Chennaiyin	3	0	1	2	1	7	−6	1					

Source: AIFF
Legend: Blue = home team win; Yellow = draw; Red = away team win.
Rules for classification: 1) points; 2) head-to-head points; 3) head-to-head goal difference; 4) goal difference; 5) number of goals scored; 6) Penalty shoot-out if only two teams are tied and they met in the last round of the group; 7) Disciplinary points; 8) drawing of lots
(H) Hosts

25 October 2025 1	Mohun Bagan	2–0	Chennaiyin	Fatorda
19:30 IST	Jamie Maclaren 38', 67'; Anirudh Thapa (yellow card) 45+1'; Alberto Rodriguez (yellow card) 47'	AIFF; I-League	Vignesh Dakshinamurthy (yellow card) 33'	Stadium: Fatorda Stadium; Attendance: 323; Referee: TV Nagvenkar; Man of the Match: Jamie Maclaren (Mohun Bagan)

28 October 2025 2	Mohun Bagan	0–0	Dempo	Fatorda
19:30 IST	Dippendu Biswas (yellow card) 26'	AIFF; I-League	Md Ali (yellow card) 34'	Stadium: Fatorda Stadium; Attendance: 576; Referee: Crystal John; Man of the Match: Ashish Sibi (Dempo)

31 October 2025 3	Mohun Bagan	0–0	East Bengal	Fatorda
19:30 IST	Subhasish Bose (yellow card) 26'	AIFF; I-League	Miguel Figueira (yellow card) 26'; Naorem Mahesh (yellow card) 26'; Jay Gupta (yellow card) 62'	Stadium: Fatorda Stadium; Attendance: 1,245; Referee: Harish Kundu; Man of the Match: Alberto Rodriguez (Mohun Bagan)

=== Indian Super League ===
==== League table ====
Pos	Team	Pld	W	D	L	GF	GA	GD	Pts	Qualification
1	East Bengal (C)	13	7	5	1	30	11	+19	26	Champions and Qualification for the Champions League Two qualifying playoffs (Note: As per Article 4 of entry regulations for AFC’s club competitions, each club needs to play a minimum of 24 matches per season in the domestic top division that runs for at least eight months, to receive direct slots in AFC club competitions. Since Indian clubs will play just 13 games, the ISL winners will enter the qualifying stage of the ACL2 instead of the group stage.)
2	Mohun Bagan	13	7	5	1	23	9	+14	26	
3	Mumbai City	13	7	4	2	17	9	+8	25	
4	Bengaluru	13	6	5	2	18	12	+6	23	
5	Jamshedpur	13	6	4	3	15	10	+5	22 (Note: Head-to-head points: Jamshedpur 3, Punjab 0.)	

Source: Indian Super League
Rules for classification: 1) points; 2) goal difference; 3) number of goals scored; 4) head-to-head points; 5) head-to-head goal difference; 6) head-to-head goals scored; 7) fair play ranking; 8) drawing of lots.
(Note: Head-to-head record is used only after all the matches between the teams in question have been played).
(C) Champions

==== Result summary ====
Overall								Home						Away					
Pld	W	D	L	GF	GA	GD	Pts	W	D	L	GF	GA	GD	W	D	L	GF	GA	GD
13	7	5	1	23	9	+14	26	6	2	1	20	7	+13	1	3	0	3	2	+1

==== Results by round ====
Round	1	2	3	4	5	6	7	8	9	12	10	11	13
Home/Away	H	H	H	H	A	H	A	H	A	A	H	H	H
Result	W	W	W	W	D	L	D	W	W	D	D	D	W
Position	3	2	1	1	1	2	2	2	1	2	2	2	2
Points	3	6	9	12	13	13	14	17	20	21	22	23	26

Updated to match(es) played on 21 May 2026. Source: Indian Super League
A = Away; H = Home; W = Win; D = Draw; L = Loss; P = Postponed

14 February 2026 1	Mohun Bagan	2–0	Kerala Blasters FC	Kolkata, India
17:00 IST	Maclaren 36'; Alberto (yellow card) 51'; Aldred 90+7'	Report	Farooq (yellow card) 30'; Naocha (yellow card) 48'; Bikash (yellow card) 82'	Stadium: Vivekananda Yuba Bharati Krirangan; Attendance: 29,110; Referee: Aditya Purkayastha; Man of the Match: Jamie Maclaren (Mohun Bagan)

23 February 2026 2	Mohun Bagan	2–0	Chennaiyin FC	Kolkata, India
19:30 IST	Tekcham (yellow card) 36'; Maclaren 45+3'; Petratos 65' , (yellow card) 84'; Aldred (yellow card) 80'	Report	Gurkirat (yellow card) 71'	Stadium: Vivekananda Yuba Bharati Krirangan; Attendance: 22,765; Referee: Ashwin; Man of the Match: Dimi Petratos (Mohun Bagan)

28 February 2026 3	Mohun Bagan	5–1	Mohammedan SC	Kolkata, India
19:30 IST	Robinho 22', 27'; Maclaren 35'; Manvir 62'; Petratos 70'	Report	Lalthankima 12'; Tangva Ragui (yellow card) 64'; Mahitosh Roy (yellow card) 87'	Stadium: Salt Lake Stadium; Attendance: 30,047; Referee: Senthil Nathan S Man of the Match: Robinho (Mohun Bagan)

6 March 2026 4	Mohun Bagan	5–1	Odisha FC	Kolkata, India
17:00 IST	Maclaren 14', 24', 45+1', 88'; Petratos (yellow card) 16'; Alberto 42'	Report	Bhanwala (yellow card) 18'; Rahim Ali 43'; Khawlhring (yellow card) 44'; Rahul KP (yellow card) 62'	Stadium: Salt Lake Stadium; Attendance: 19,727; Referee: I Jamal Mohammed; Man of the Match: Jamie Maclaren (Mohun Bagan)

14 March 2026 5	Bengaluru FC	0–0	Mohun Bagan	Bengaluru, India
19:30 IST	Sanchez (yellow card) 60'	Report	Apuia (yellow card) 86'	Stadium: Sree Kanteerava Stadium; Attendance: 20,214; Referee: Lakshay; Man of the Match: Dimi Petratos (Mohun Bagan)

20 March 2026 6	Mohun Bagan	0–1	Mumbai City FC	Kolkata, India
19:30 IST	Tangri (yellow card) 48'; Petratos (yellow card) 62'	Report	Díaz (yellow card) 2'; Noufal 28'; Hmingthanmawia (yellow card) 45+3'; Akash (yellow card) 63'; Vikram (yellow card) 80'	Stadium: Vivekananda Yuba Bharati Krirangan; Attendance: 26,997; Referee: Venkatesh R Man of the Match: Phurba Lachenpa (Mumbai City FC)

4 April 2026 7	Jamshedpur FC	1–1	Mohun Bagan	Jamshedpur, India
17:00 IST	Eze (yellow card) 72'; Ritwik Das 90+5'	Report	Colaco 15'; Alberto (yellow card) 38'; Apuia (yellow card) 50'	Stadium: JRD Tata Sports Complex; Attendance: 12789; Referee: Harish Kundu; Man of the Match: Ritwik Das (Jamshedpur FC)

12 April 2026 8	Mohun Bagan	3–2	Punjab FC	Kolkata, India
19:30 IST	Maclaren 29' , (yellow card) 90+8'; Bose (yellow card) 40'; Sahal 74'; Cummings 90+1' , (yellow card) 90+4'	Report	Ramírez 12'; Pramveer (yellow card) 42'; Effiong 60' , (yellow card) 67'; Rakesh Meitei (yellow card) 90'; Arshdeep (yellow card) 90+2'; Ricky (yellow card) 90+2'	Stadium: Vivekananda Yuba Bharati Krirangan; Attendance: 12,222; Referee: Venkatesh R Man of the Match: Jamie Maclaren (Mohun Bagan)

19 April 2026 9	NorthEast United FC	0–1	Mohun Bagan	Guwahati, India
19:30 IST	Samperio (yellow card) 1'; Thoi Singh (yellow card) 49'; Samte (yellow card) 90+8'	Report	Robinho 5'; Kaith (yellow card) 25'; Bose (yellow card) 45+2'	Stadium: Indira Gandhi Athletic Stadium; Attendance: 3,847; Referee: Crystal John; Man of the Match: Robinho (Mohun Bagan)

9 May 2026 12	FC Goa	1–1	Mohun Bagan	Panaji, India
17:00 IST	Sangwan (yellow card) 4'; Boris (yellow card) 44'; Ronney 67'	Report	Alberto (yellow card) 45+1'; Maclaren 56'	Stadium: Fatorda Stadium; Attendance: 2,354; Referee: Aditya Purkayastha; Man of the Match: Bob Jackson Raj (FC Goa)

~~26 April 2026~~; 12 May 2026 10	Mohun Bagan	0–0	Inter Kashi	Kolkata, India
19:30 IST	Sahal (yellow card) 59'; Bose (yellow card) 90'	Report	Shubham (yellow card) 60'	Stadium: Vivekananda Yuba Bharati Krirangan; Attendance: 20,004; Referee: Ashwin; Man of the Match: Deepak Tangri (Mohun Bagan)

~~3 May 2026~~; 17 May 2026 11	Mohun Bagan	1–1	East Bengal	Kolkata, India
19:30 IST	Alberto (yellow card) 25'; Cummings 90'	Report	Gill (yellow card) 59'; Edmund 85', (yellow card) 86' (yellow-red card) 90+7'	Stadium: Vivekananda Yuba Bharati Krirangan; Attendance: 62,201; Referee: Venkatesh R Man of the Match: Miguel Figueira (East Bengal)

21 May 2026 13	Mohun Bagan	2–1	SC Delhi	Kolkata, India
19:30IST	Manvir 90', (yellow card) 90+9'; Maclaren 90+9', (yellow card) 90+9'	Report	Manoj (yellow card) 52'; Clarence 62', (red card) 90+10'; Fané (yellow card) 76'; Nora (yellow card) 88'	Stadium: Vivekananda Yuba Bharati Krirangan; Attendance: 26,732; Referee: Venkatesh R Man of the Match: Jamie Maclaren (Mohun Bagan)

== Player Statistics ==
=== Appearances ===
Players with no appearances are not included in the list.

As of 21 May 2026

Appearances for Mohun Bagan in 2025–26 season
No.	Pos.	Nat.	Name	Durand Cup		Indian Super League		Super Cup		ACL TWO		IFA Shield		Calcutta League		Total	
No.	Pos.	Nat.	Name	Apps	Starts	Apps	Starts	Apps	Starts	Apps	Starts	Apps	Starts	Apps	Starts	Apps	Starts
Goalkeepers
1	GK	(India)	Vishal Kaith	4	4	13	13	3	3	1	1	2	2	—		23	23
24	GK	(India)	Syed Zahid	—		—		—		—		1	1	—		1	1
61	GK	(India)	Deeprobhat Ghosh	—		—		—		—		—		10	10	10	10
Defenders
4	DF	(India)	Sahil Inamdar	—		—		—		—		—		6	5	6	5
4	DF	(India)	Amey Ranawade	—		8	2	—		—		—		—		8	2
5	CB	(Scotland)	Tom Aldred	3	3	12	8	3	3	1	1	3	3	—		22	18
15	LB	(India)	Subhasish Bose	—		12	11	2	2	1	0	2	2	—		17	15
21	CB	(Spain)	Alberto Rodríguez	2	1	10	10	3	2	1	1	3	2	—		19	16
27	LB	(India)	Abhishek Tekcham	4	3	13	12	1	1	1	1	2	1	—		21	18
32	CB	(India)	Dippendu Biswas	3	2	—		1	1	—		1	0	1	1	6	4
32 (Note: CFL Jersey No.)	DF	(India)	Aditya Mondal	—		—		—		—		—		9	3	9	3
36	DF	(India)	Muhammad Bilal CV	—		—		—		—		—		10	9	10	9
44	RB	(India)	Asish Rai	3	3	—		1	1	1	1	2	1	—		7	6
53	RB	(India)	Leewan Castanha	3	1	—		—		—		—		7	7	10	8
55	RB	(India)	Mehtab Singh	—		10	8	3	2	—		3	3	—		16	13
65	DF	(India)	Marshal Kisku	—		—		—		—		—		8	7	8	7
73	DF	(India)	Umer Muhthar	—		—		—		—		—		1	1	1	1
77	DF	(India)	Thangjam Roshan Singh	2	1	—		—		—		—		6	4	8	5
78	DF	(India)	Piush Thakuri	—		—		—		—		—		7	2	7	2
96	DF	(India)	Pabitra Mandi	—		—		—		—		—		2	1	2	1
Midfielders
6	MF	(India)	Anirudh Thapa	4	4	13	12	2	2	1	0	3	2	—		23	20
9	AM/ SS	(Australia)	Dimi Petratos	1	0	12	7	2	1	—		2	1	—		17	9
16	MF	(India)	Abhishek Suryavanshi	3	2	2	0	1	1	—		2	1	—		8	4
17	MF	(India)	Muhammad Niyaj	—		—		—		—		—		2	0	2	0
18	AM	(India)	Sahal Abdul Samad	3	2	11	5	3	3	1	1	1	1	—		19	12
22	MF	(India)	Deepak Tangri	4	3	10	3	3	1	1	1	1	0	—		19	8
30	MF	(India)	Pallujam Rohan Singh	—		—		—		—		—		2	1	2	1
42	MF	(India)	Gurnaj Singh Grewal	—		—		—		—		—		3	1	3	1
44	MF	(India)	Nishar	—		—		—		—		—		4	3	4	3
45	MF	(India)	Apuia	3	3	9	9	3	2	1	1	2	2	—		18	17
50	MF	(India)	Gogocha Chungkham	—		—		—		—		—		4	2	4	2
55	MF	(India)	Rohit Singh	—		—		—		—		—		3	0	3	0
56	MF	(India)	Sandeep Malik	—		—		—		—		—		7	7	7	7
63	MF	(India)	Aditya Adhikary	—		—		—		—		—		3	1	3	1
71	MF	(India)	Salahudheen Adnan K	—		—		—		—		—		4	4	4	4
74	MF	(India)	Sahil Kar	—		—		—		—		—		2	0	2	0
79	MF	(India)	Taibangnganba Pangambam	—		—		—		—		—		2	1	2	1
80	MF	(India)	Mingma Sherpa	—		—		—		—		—		8	8	8	8
81	MF	(India)	Thumsol Tongsin	—		—		—		—		1	1	9	7	10	8
Forwards
7	LW	(India)	Liston Colaco	4	4	13	11	2	2	1	1	1	1	—		21	19
10	LW	(Brazil)	Robson Robinho	—		11	8	2	1	1	0	3	2	—		17	11
11	RW	(India)	Manvir Singh	1	1	13	7	3	2	—		2	1	—		17	11
17	RW	(India)	Kiyan Nassiri	2	1	4	0	—		1	1	2	2	1	1	10	5
23	FW	(India)	Pasang Dorjee Tamang	3	2	—		—		—		—		8	7	11	9
25	FW	(India)	Tushar Biswakarma	—		—		—		—		—		7	4	7	4
27	FW	(India)	Bharat Lairenjam	—		—		—		—		—		1	0	1	0
29	ST	(Australia)	Jamie Maclaren	2	2	13	12	3	2	1	0	3	2	—		22	18
35	FW	(Australia)	Jason Cummings	2	0	13	7	3	1	1	1	3	2	—		22	11
43	FW	(India)	Shibam Munda	—		—		—		—		—		8	4	8	4
62	FW	(India)	Bivan Jyoti Laskar	—		—		—		—		—		1	0	1	0
72	FW	(India)	Suhail Bhat	3	2	—		2	0	—		1	0	1	1	7	3
90	FW	(India)	Adil Abdullah	—		—		—		—		—		4	0	4	0
98	FW	(India)	Karan Rai	2	0	—		—		—		—		8	8	10	8

=== Goals ===
As of 21 May 2026

Rank	No.	Nat.	Name	Durand Cup	Indian Super League	IFA Shield	Super Cup	Calcutta League	Total
1	29	(Australia)	Jamie Maclaren	1	10	2	2	—	15
2	7	(India)	Liston Colaco	5	1	—	—	—	6
3	98	(India)	Karan Rai	—	—	—	—	5	5
4	10	(Brazil)	Robson Robinho	—	3	1	—	—	4
4	43	(India)	Shivam Munda	—	—	—	—	4	4
4	35	(Australia)	Jason Cummings	1	2	1	—	—	4
5	9	(Australia)	Dimi Petratos	—	2	1	—	—	3
5	11	(India)	Manvir Singh	1	2	—	—	—	3
5	18	(India)	Sahal Abdul Samad	2	1	—	—	—	3
5	23	(India)	Pasang Tamang	—	—	—	—	3	3
6	6	(India)	Anirudh Thapa	2	—	—	—	—	2
6	21	(Spain)	Alberto Rodríguez	—	1	1	—	—	2
6	56	(India)	Sandeep Malik	—	—	—	—	2	2
7
7	5	(Australia)	Tom Aldred	—	1	—	—	—	1
7	17	(India)	Kiyan Nassiri	—	—	—	—	1	1
7	25	(India)	Tushar Biswakarma	—	—	—	—	1	1
7	45	(India)	Apuia	—	—	1	—	—	1
7	53	(India)	Leewan Castanha	—	—	—	—	1	1
7	63	(India)	Aditya Adhikari	—	—	—	—	1	1
7	72	(India)	Suhail Bhat	1	—	—	—	—	1
7	78	(India)	Piyush Thakuri	—	—	—	—	1	1
7	90	(India)	Adil Abdullah	—	—	—	—	1	1
Own Goal(s)				—	—	1	—	1	2
Total				13	23	8	2	21	67

=== Assists ===
As of 21 May 2026

Rank	No.	Nat.	Name	Durand Cup	Indian Super League	IFA Shield	Super Cup	Calcutta League	Total
1	7	(India)	Liston Colaco	2	4	1	1	—	8
2	18	(India)	Sahal Abdul Samad	4	1	—	—	—	5
3	81	(India)	Thumsol Tongsin	—	—	—	—	4	4
4	9	(Australia)	Dimi Petratos	—	3	—	—	—	3
4	10	(Brazil)	Robson Robinho	—	1	2	—	—	3
4	15	(India)	Subhasish Bose	—	3	—	—	—	3
5	6	(India)	Anirudh Thapa	—	2	—	—	—	2
5	11	(India)	Manvir Singh	—	1	—	1	—	2
5	27	(India)	Abhishek Singh Tekcham	—	1	1	—	—	2
5	53	(India)	Leewan Castanha	—	—	—	—	2	2
6	4	(India)	Sahil Imandar	—	—	—	—	1	1
6	22	(India)	Dipendu Biswas	—	—	—	—	1	1
6	23	(India)	Pasang Dorjee Tamang	—	—	—	—	1	1
6	25	(India)	Kiyan Nassiri	1	—	—	—	—	1
6	29	(Australia)	Jamie Maclaren	—	—	1	—	—	1
6	30	(India)	Pallujam Rohan Singh	—	—	—	—	1	1
6	35	(Australia)	Jason Cummings	—	—	1	—	—	1
6	43	(India)	Shivam Munda	—	—	—	—	1	1
6	44	(India)	Asish Rai	1	—	—	—	—	1
6	50	(India)	Gogocha Chungkham	—	—	—	—	1	1
6	56	(India)	Sandeep Malik	—	—	—	—	1	1
6	71	(India)	Salahudheen Adnan K	—	—	—	—	1	1
6	77	(India)	Thangjam Roshan Singh	1	—	—	—	—	1
6	80	(India)	Mingma Sherpa	—	—	—	—	1	1
6	98	(India)	Karan Rai	—	—	—	—	1	1

=== Cleansheets ===
As of 21 May 2026

Rank	No.	Pos.	Nat.	Name	Durand Cup	Indian Super League	IFA Shield	Super Cup	Calcutta League	Total
1	1	GK	(India)	Vishal Kaith	1	5	0	3	—	9
2	61	GK	(India)	Deepprobhat Ghosh	—	—	—	—	3	3
3	24	GK	(India)	Syed Zahid	—	—	1	—	—	1

== Disciplinary Record ==
As of 21 May 2026

No.	Nat.	Name	Durand Cup			Indian Super League			ACL TWO			IFA Shield			Super Cup			Calcutta League			Total		
No.	Nat.	Name	Yellow card	(yellow card) (yellow-red card)	Red card	Yellow card	(yellow card) (yellow-red card)	Red card	Yellow card	(yellow card) (yellow-red card)	Red card	Yellow card	(yellow card) (yellow-red card)	Red card	Yellow card	(yellow card) (yellow-red card)	Red card	Yellow card	(yellow card) (yellow-red card)	Red card	Yellow card	(yellow card) (yellow-red card)	Red card
45	(India)	Apuia	2	0	1	2	0	0	—			1	0	0	—			—			5	0	1
15	(India)	Subhasish Bose	—			3	0	0	—			2	0	0	1	0	0	—			6	0	0
21	(Spain)	Alberto Rodríguez	—			4	0	0	—			1	0	0	1	0	0	—			6	0	0
9	(Australia)	Dimi Petratos	1	0	0	3	0	0	—			—			—			—			4	0	0
32	(India)	Dippendu Biswas	2	0	0	—			—			—			1	0	0	—			3	0	0
53	(India)	Leewan Castanha	—			—			—			—			—			3	0	0	3	0	0
65	(India)	Marshal Kisku	—			—			—			—			—			3	0	0	3	0	0
5	(Scotland)	Tom Aldred	—			1	0	0	1	0	0	—			—			—			2	0	0
22	(India)	Deepak Tangri	1	0	0	1	0	0	—			—			—			—			2	0	0
29	(Australia)	Jamie Maclaren	—			2	0	0	—			—			—			—			2	0	0
71	(India)	Salahudheen Adnan K	—			—			—			—			—			0	0	1	0	0	1
1	(India)	Vishal Kaith	—			1	0	0	—			—			—			—			1	0	0
4	(India)	Sahil Inamdar	—			—			—			—			—			1	0	0	1	0	0
6	(India)	Anirudh Thapa	—			—			—			—			1	0	0	—			1	0	0
10	(Brazil)	Robson Robinho	—			—			—			1	0	0	—			—			1	0	0
11	(India)	Manvir Singh	—			1	0	0	—			—			—			—			1	0	0
18	(India)	Sahal Abdul Samad	—			1	0	0	—			—			—			—			1	0	0
27	(India)	Abhishek Singh Tekcham	—			1	0	0	—			—			—			—			1	0	0
35	(Australia)	Jason Cummings	—			1	0	0	—			—			—			—			1	0	0
44	(India)	Ashish Rai	1	0	0	—			—			—			—			—			1	0	0
44 (Note: CFL Jersey No.)	(India)	Nishar	—			—			—			—			—			1	0	0	1	0	0
61	(India)	Deeprobhat Ghosh	—			—			—			—			—			1	0	0	1	0	0
78	(India)	Piyush Thakuri	—			—			—			—			—			1	0	0	1	0	0
80	(India)	Mingma Sherpa	—			—			—			—			—			1	0	0	1	0	0
81	(India)	Thumsol Tongsin	—			—			—			—			—			1	0	0	1	0	0
98	(India)	Karan Rai	—			—			—			—			—			1	0	0	1	0	0
Total			7	0	1	21	0	0	1	0	0	5	0	0	3	0	0	13	0	1	50	1	1

== Manager Stats ==
=== José Francisco Molina ===
Competition	Record							
Competition	Pld	W	D	L	GF	GA	GD	Win %
Durand Cup	3	2	0	1	10	3	+7	66.67
AFC Champions League 2	1	0	0	1	0	1	−1	0.00
IFA Shield	3	3	0	0	8	2	+6	100.00
Super Cup	3	1	2	0	2	0	+2	33.33
Total	10	6	2	2	20	6	+14	60.00

Last updated: 31 October 2025
Source: Competitions

- Includes Only The Games Played Under José Francisco Molina

=== Bastob Roy ===
Competition	Record							
Competition	Pld	W	D	L	GF	GA	GD	Win %
Durand Cup	1	1	0	0	3	1	+2	100.00
Total	1	1	0	0	3	1	+2	100.00

Last updated: 31 July 2025
Source: Competitions

- Includes Only The Games Played Under Bastob Roy (Asst of José Francisco Molina)

=== Sergio Lobera ===
Competition	Record							
Competition	Pld	W	D	L	GF	GA	GD	Win %
ISL	13	7	5	1	23	9	+14	53.85
Total	13	7	5	1	23	9	+14	53.85

Last updated: 21 May 2026
Source: Competitions

- Includes Only The Games Played Under Sergio Lobera

== Youth Teams ==
For Detailed Stats and Information refer to 2025–26 Mohun Bagan SG Youth and Academy

== Overview ==
Competition	First match (round)	Latest match (round)	Final position
Calcutta Football League	30 June 2025; Group stage	30 August 2025; Round 12	6/12 Group stage
RFDL	16 January; Regional Group Stage	23 March; National Group Stage	4th of 6 in National Group
AIFF U18 League	17 November; Zonal Group stage	21 April 2026; National Group Stage	3rd of 4 in National Group
AIFF Junior League (U16)	13 January; Zonal Group Stage	8 May; National Group Stage	3rd of 4 in National Group
AIFF Sub Junior League (U14)	15 January; Zonal Group Stage	9 May; Quarter Finals	Quarter Finals

=== Calcutta Football League ===
==== Summary ====
Mohun Bagan participated in the 2025 CFL Premier Division and was drawn into group A for the first phase of the tournament where twenty-six teams were divided into two groups of thirteen. Mohun Bagan fielded mostly the reserve squad led by head coach Deggie Cardozo for the Calcutta Football League like the previous three seasons.
Mohun Bagan began its Calcutta Football League 2025–26 campaign with a slender 0–1 loss against Police AC on 30.06.2025 at the Naihati Stadium.

=== Group A ===
Pos	Team	Pld	W	D	L	GF	GA	GD	Pts	EAB	SUS	CCU	PAC	PTC	MBG	BSS	KSL	GGT	MEA	KMS	RLY	ARM (Note: Army Red didn't field their team in group stage, thus IFA gave free 3 points to all other teams of Group A with 3–0 victory.)
4	Police AC	12	7	3	2	24	8	+16	24					5–0		4–1			2–1	1–1		3–0
5	Pathachakra	12	6	1	5	15	16	−1	19	1–0	0–1								1–0			3–0
6	Mohun Bagan SG	12	6	2	4	24	14	+10	18 (Note: Mohun Bagan were deducted 2 points as punishment for not playing match vs Measurers.)		1–1	0–1	0–1	5–2			4–0	0–0				
7	BSS	12	5	2	5	15	21	−6	17	0–6	1–2			2–0	2–5		1–0			1–0	0–0	
8	Kalighat SLA	12	5	1	6	10	14	−4	16				0–0	0–2					1–0	2–1	2–0	3–0

Source: The Away End
Legend: Blue = home team win; Yellow = draw; Red = away team win.
Rules for classification: 1) points; 2) head-to-head points; 3) head-to-head goal difference; 4) goal difference; 5) number of goals scored; 6) drawing of lots

=== Matches ===
30 June 2025 1	Mohun Bagan	0–1	Police AC	Kolkata, India
15:00 IST		AIFF; I-League	Md Amil Naim 45+3'	Stadium: Bankimanjali Stadium, Naihati; Attendance: 2000; Referee: Debabrata Naskar

3 July 2025 2	Kalighat SLA	0–4	Mohun Bagan	Kolkata, India
15:00 IST	Pravakar Naskar (yellow card) 28'	AIFF; I-League	Sandeep Malik 21'; Lenminlun Doungel 30' (o.g.); Pasang Tamang 51'; Adil Abdullah 73'; Leewan Castanha (yellow card) 79'	Stadium: Bankimanjali Stadium, Naihati; Attendance: 2790; Referee: Rabin Biswas; Man of the Match: Pasang Dorjee Tamang (Mohun Bagan SG)

7 July 2025 3	Railways FC	0–2	Mohun Bagan	Kolkata, India
15:00 IST	Soumik Koley (yellow card) 45+2' (red card) 60'; Abhishek Aich (red card) 60'; Sudipta Banerjee (red card) 60'	AIFF; I-League	Sandeep Malik 6'; Mingma Sherpa (yellow card) 28'; Marshal Kisku (yellow card) 35'; Sahil Inamdar (yellow card) 60'; Salahudheen Adnan K (red card) 60'; Shibam Munda 90'	Stadium: Bibhutibhushan Bandyopadhyay Stadium, Barrackpore; Attendance: 600; Referee: Bimalendu Mondal; Man of the Match: Sandeep Malik (Mohun Bagan SG)

11 July 2025 4	George Telegraph	0–0	Mohun Bagan	West Bengal, India
15:00 IST	Rakesh Bahadur (yellow card) 76'	AIFF; I-League	Leewan Castanha (yellow card) 90+2'	Stadium: Bankimanjali Stadium, Naihati; Attendance: 250; Referee: Rohan DasGupta; Man of the Match: Rakesh Bahadur (George Telegraph)

16 July 2025 5	Kalighat MS	1–2	Mohun Bagan	West Bengal, India
15:00 IST	Surajit Halder 18'; Sourav Chowdhury (yellow card) 45+3'; Amritpal Singh (yellow card) 90+8'	AIFF; I-League	Pasang Tamang 4'; Karan Rai 65'	Stadium: Kalyani Stadium; Attendance: 1000; Referee: Suvajit Pramanik; Man of the Match: Pasang Dorjee Tamang (Mohun Bagan)

26 July 2025 6	East Bengal	3–2	Mohun Bagan	Kolkata, India
17:30 IST	Jesin TK 9'; Sayan Banerjee 45+6'; Martand Raina (yellow card) 45+7'; Suman Dey (yellow card) 53'; Aman CK (yellow card) 63' (yellow-red card) 90+8'; David 69', (yellow card) 70'; Debjit Majumder (yellow card) 90+8'	AIFF; I-League	Karan Rai (yellow card) 31'; Deeprobhat Ghosh (yellow card) 45'; Leewan Castanha 55'; Kiyan Nassiri 67'	Stadium: Kalyani Stadium; Attendance: 14,350; Referee: Aditya Purkayastha; Man of the Match: Sayan Banerjee (East Bengal FC)

13 August 2025 7	Mohun Bagan	0–3 w/o	Measurers Club	Kolkata, India
15:00 IST		Report		Stadium: Mohun Bagan Ground
Note: Mohun Bagan didn't field their team and as a result, they were deducted 2 points and IFA counted it as a 3–0 victory to Measurers.

21 August 2025 8	Mohun Bagan	1–1	Suruchi Sangha	Kolkata, India
15:00 IST	Leewan Castanha (yellow card) 22'; Marshal Kisku (yellow card) 41'; Thumsol Tongisn (yellow card) 74'; Tushar Biswakarma 87'	AIFF; I-League	Balaram Mandi (yellow card) 19'; Tapan Halder (yellow card) 39'; Seijoseph Haokip 45+3'; Debjit Basak (yellow card) 74'	Stadium: Naihati Stadium; Attendance: 500; Referee: Dipu Roy; Man of the Match: Tanmoy Ghosh (Suruchi Sangha)

24 August 2025 9	Behala SS Sporting Club	2–5	Mohun Bagan	Kolkata, India
15:00 IST	Romin Goldar 48'; Tuhin Pore 50'; Vijay Kumar (yellow card) 52'	AIFF; I-League	Shivam Munda 29', 41', 54'; Aditya Adhikary 63'; Karan Rai 88'	Stadium: Naihati Stadium; Attendance: 300; Referee: Dipak Singha; Man of the Match: Shivam Munda (Mohun Bagan)

27 August 2025 10	Mohun Bagan	0–1	Calcutta Customs Club	Kolkata, India
15:00 IST	Piush Thakuri (yellow card) 24'; Marshal Kisku (yellow card) 90+6'	AIFF; I-League	Bishal Roy (yellow card) 25'; Zahid Yousif (yellow card) 61'; Batas Murmu (yellow card) 71'; Rahul Soren (yellow card) 76'; Rounak Pal 90+6'	Stadium: Naihati Stadium; Attendance: 700; Referee: Tarun Kumar Biswas; Man of the Match: Rounak Pal (Calcutta Customs)

30 August 2025 11	Pathachakra	2–5	Mohun Bagan	Kolkata, India
15:00 IST	David Motla 14'; Sagun Soren (yellow card) 29'; Soumyajit Tarafder 69'; Ronaldo Murmu (yellow card) 82'	AIFF; I-League	Pasang Dorjee Tamang 6'; Karan Rai 24', 48', 65'; Nishar (yellow card) 37'; Piyush Thakuri 45'	Stadium: Naihati Stadium; Attendance: 300; Referee: Rohan Das Gupta; Man of the Match: Karan Rai (Mohun Bagan)

— 12	Mohun Bagan	3–0 w/o	Army Red
Note: Army Red didn't field their team in group stage, thus IFA gave free 3 points to all other teams of Group A with 3–0 victory.
