= 2026 IFA Shield =

২০২৬ আইএফএ শিল্ড

Tournament details
- Country: India
- Dates: 23 September – 8 October
- Teams: 6

Final positions
- Champions: Mohun Bagan (22nd title)

Tournament statistics
- Matches played: 9
- Goals scored: 33 (3.67 per match)
- Attendance: 73,331 (8,148 per match)
- Top goal scorer(s): David Lalhlansanga; Lallianzuala Chhangte; Raphaël Messi Bouli; Alaeddine Ajaraie (3 goals each)

The 2026 IFA Shield was the 126th edition of the IFA Shield hosted by the Indian Football Association. The tournament will be held between 22 September–8 October before the start of the Indian Football League and Indian Super League.

The tournament will feature domestic teams from the Indian Super League and Indian Football League. Defending champions Mohun Bagan along with East Bengal, Mohammedan, NorthEast United, Punjab and Sreenidhi Deccan were confirmed as the 6 participants by the IFA.

== Teams ==
Here is the list of confirmed teams: However, Mohammedan withdrew their name and Calcutta Customs was taken in as a replacement.

Locations of 2026 IFA Shield clubs

Club	Location
Indian Super League teams
East Bengal	Kolkata, West Bengal
Mohun Bagan	Kolkata, West Bengal
NorthEast United	Guwahati, Assam
Punjab	Ludhiana, Punjab
Indian Football League teams
Sreenidi Deccan	Hyderabad, Telangana
Calcutta Football League teams
Calcutta Customs	Kolkata, West Bengal

== Venues ==
- East Bengal Ground, Kolkata
- Kishore Bharati Krirangan, Santoshpur
- Mohun Bagan Ground, Kolkata
- Vidyasagar Krirangan, Barasat
- Vivekananda Yuba Bharati Krirangan, Kolkata (Final)

== Format ==
6 teams will be divided into two groups of 3 teams. After a group stage consisting of single round-robin matches, top two teams from each group will qualify for the semi-final.

=== Rules ===
- Each team can register 6 foreign players.
- 6 foreign players can play on the field at a time.

== Group stage ==
=== Group A ===
Pos	Team	Pld	W	D	L	GF	GA	GD	Pts	Qualification	MBG	NEU	SDC
1	Mohun Bagan (H)	2	1	1	0	7	1	+6	4	Advance to the Semi-Final		1–1	6–0
2	NorthEast United	2	1	1	0	4	1	+3	4	Advance to the Semi-Final			3–0
3	Sreenidi Deccan	2	0	0	2	0	9	−9	0				

Source: IFA
Legend: Blue = home team win; Yellow = draw; Red = away team win.
Rules for classification: Group stage tiebreakers
(H) Hosts
23 September 2026
15:00 IST

Sreenidi Deccan	0–6	Mohun Bagan
	Report; PDF Report	Suryavanshi 8'; Chhangte 44', 52', 57'; Malik 80'; Erwin 82'

Mohun Bagan Ground, Kolkata
Attendance: 11,327
Referee: Surojit Das
Man of the Match: Lallianzuala Chhangte (Mohun Bagan)

26 September 2026
14:30 IST

Sreenidi Deccan	0–3	NorthEast United
	Report; PDF Report	Jithin 7'; Laishram 32'; Ajaraie 60'

Barasat Stadium, Barasat
Attendance: 500
Referee: Dipu Roy
Man of the Match: Alaeddine Ajaraie (NorthEast United)

29 September 2026
14:30 IST

NorthEast United	1–1	Mohun Bagan
Ethyan 71'	Report; PDF Report	Erwin 49'

Mohun Bagan Ground, Kolkata
Attendance: 15,748
Referee: Rabin Biswas
Man of the Match: Dipesh Chauhan (NorthEast United)

=== Group B ===
Pos	Team	Pld	W	D	L	GF	GA	GD	Pts	Qualification	PFC	EAB	CCC
1	Punjab	2	2	0	0	8	0	+8	6	Advance to the Semi-Final		1–0	7–0
2	East Bengal (H)	2	1	0	1	3	2	+1	3	Advance to the Semi-Final			3–1
3	Calcutta Customs	2	0	0	2	1	10	−9	0				

Source: IFA
Legend: Blue = home team win; Yellow = draw; Red = away team win.
Rules for classification: Group stage tiebreakers
(H) Hosts
24 September 2026
15:00 IST

Calcutta Customs	1–3	East Bengal
Gharami 12'	Report; PDF Report	Kumar 29'; Danu 52'; Hemram 85'

East Bengal Ground, Kolkata
Attendance: 3,509
Referee: Mithun Kumar Kundu
Man of the Match: Rohit Kumar (East Bengal)

27 September 2026
14:30 IST

Calcutta Customs	0–7	Punjab
	Report; PDF Report	Messi Bouli 6', 8', 45'; Konsam 20'; Sharma 30'; Planas 43'; G. Singh 62'

Barasat Stadium, Barasat
Attendance: 175
Referee: Sarnendu Bagchi
Man of the Match: Raphaël Messi Bouli (Punjab)

30 September 2026
14:30 IST

Punjab	1–0	East Bengal
Raposo 41'	Report; PDF Report

East Bengal Ground, Kolkata
Attendance: 1234
Referee: Pratik Mondal
Man of the Match: Diego Raposo (Punjab)

== Semi Finals ==
The draws for the semi finals were held at the Indian Football Association on 30 September 2026.

=== Bracket ===
In the knockout stage, for any draws matches would be directly decided by a penalty shootout.

Semi-finals
4 October – Kishore Bharati
Mohun Bagan (p)	0 (4)
Punjab	0 (3)
5 October – Kishore Bharati
East Bengal	7
NorthEast United	2

Final
8 October – Yuba Bharati
Mohun Bagan	1
East Bengal	0

=== Matches ===
4 October 2026
17:00 IST

Mohun Bagan SG	0–0 (a.e.t.)	Punjab
	Report; PDF Report
Penalties
Bheke (penalty scored); Bose (penalty scored); Rodríguez (penalty scored); Dražić (penalty missed); Figueira (penalty scored)	4–3	Messi Bouli (penalty scored); A. Singh (penalty scored); Shaiza (penalty missed); Yadav (penalty missed); Laishram (penalty scored)

Kishore Bharati Krirangan, Kolkata
Attendance: 7,067
Referee: Bimalendu Mondal
Man of the Match: Vishal Kaith (Mohun Bagan SG)

5 October 2026
17:00 IST

East Bengal	7–2	NorthEast United
Lalhlansanga 11', 46', 56'; R. Kumar 23'; Ikonomidis 43'; Arnaud Loba 85'; Zwoliński 90+1'	Report; PDF Report	Ajaraie 2', 84'

Kishore Bharati Krirangan, Kolkata
Attendance: 4,563
Referee: Surojit Das
Man of the Match: David Lalhlansanga (East Bengal)

== Final ==
8 October 2026
18:15 IST

Mohun Bagan	1–0	East Bengal
Zeljković 44'	Report; PDF Report

Vivekananda Yuba Bharati Krirangan, Kolkata
Attendance: 52,730
Referee: Pratik Mondal
Man of the Match: Dejan Dražić (Mohun Bagan SG)

Mohun Bagan	East Bengal

GK	1	(India) Vishal Kaith
DF	2	(India) Rahul Bheke
DF	5	(India) Mehtab Singh
MF	8	(Bosnia and Herzegovina) Samir Zeljković
FW	9	(India) Lallianzuala Chhangte
MF	18	(India) Sahal Abdul Samad
FW	19	(Scotland) Lee Erwin
MF	22	(India) Deepak Tangri
DF	21	(Spain) Alberto Rodríguez
DF	27	(India) Abhishek Singh
FW	71	(Serbia) Dejan Dražić
Substitutes:
MF	6	(India) Anirudh Thapa
FW	7	(India) Liston Colaco
MF	10	(Brazil) Miguel Figueira
FW	11	(India) Manvir Singh
FW	14	(India) Sayan Banerjee
DF	15	(India) Subhasish Bose
MF	16	(India) Abhishek Suryavanshi
GK	24	(India) Syed Zahid Hussain
DF	40	(India) Alex Saji
FW	72	(India) Suhail Bhat
Head coach:
(Greece) Panagiotis Dilmperis

GK	1	(India) Phurba Lachenpa
DF	3	(India) Hardik Bhatt
DF	5	(India) Lalchungnunga
FW	10	(India) Edmund Lalrindika
MF	11	(Spain) Dani Ramírez
DF	21	(Croatia) Diego Živulić
MF	25	(India) Jeakson Singh
DF	27	(India) Jay Gupta
FW	29	(India) Bipin Singh
DF	34	(India) Sandip Mandi
MF	74	(Palestine) Mohammed Rashid
Substitutes:
DF	4	(India) Anwar Ali
MF	6	(India) Rohit Kumar
FW	7	(India) PV Vishnu
MF	8	(Australia) Chris Ikonomidis
GK	13	(India) Prabhsukhan Gill
FW	14	(India) Lalhlansanga
MF	19	(India) Rohit Danu
MF	36	(India) Asif Khan
FW	90	(Ivory Coast) Aké Arnaud Loba
FW	99	(Poland) Łukasz Zwoliński
Head coach:
(Spain) Antonio López Habas

Player of the Match

- Dejan Dražić
  (Mohun Bagan)

Match rules

- 90 minutes.
- 30 minutes of extra time if necessary.
- Penalty shoot-out if scores still level.
- Ten named substitutes.
- Maximum of five substitutions.

== Statistics ==
=== Goalscorers ===
There were 32 goals scored in 8 matches, for an average of 4 goals per match.

3 goals

- (India) David Lalhlansanga (East Bengal)
- (India) Lallianzuala Chhangte (Mohun Bagan)
- (Cameroon) Raphaël Messi Bouli (Punjab)
- (Morocco) Alaeddine Ajaraie (NorthEast United)

2 goals

- (Scotland) Lee Erwin (Mohun Bagan)
- (India) Rohit Kumar (East Bengal)

1 goal

- (India) Abhishek Suryavanshi (Mohun Bagan)
- (Ivory Coast) Aké Arnaud Loba (East Bengal)
- (Australia) Chris Ikonomidis (East Bengal)
- (Poland) Łukasz Zwoliński (East Bengal)
- (India) Sandeep Malik (Mohun Bagan)
- (India) Rohit Danu (East Bengal)
- (India) Akash Hemram (East Bengal)
- (India) Riki Gharami (Calcutta Customs)
- (India) Jithin MS (NorthEast United)
- (India) Danny Meitei Laishram (NorthEast United)
- (India) Konsam Sanathoi Singh (Punjab)
- (India) Bishu Sharma (Punjab)
- (Spain) Alfred Planas (Punjab)
- (India) Gurkirat Singh (Punjab)
- (Spain) Ethyan González (NorthEast United)
- (Brazil) Diego Raposo (Punjab)
- (Bosnia and Herzegovina) Samir Zeljković (Mohun Bagan)

=== Hat-tricks ===
Player	For	Against	Result	Date	Ref
(India) David Lalhlansanga	East Bengal	NorthEast United	7–2	5 October 2026	
(India) Lallianzuala Chhangte	Mohun Bagan	Sreenidhi Deccan	6–0	23 September 2026	
(Cameroon) Raphaël Messi Bouli	Punjab	Calcutta Customs	7–0	27 September 2026	

=== Clean sheets ===
2 Clean sheets

- (India) Arshdeep Singh (Punjab)

3 Clean sheet

- (India) Vishal Kaith (Mohun Bagan)

1 Clean sheet

- (India) Gurmeet Singh (NorthEast United)

== See also ==
- 2026 CFL Premier Division
- 2026–27 East Bengal season
- 2026–27 Mohun Bagan season
