= 2026–27 Mohun Bagan Super Giant season =

136th football season of Mohun Bagan

Mohun Bagan
2026–27 season
- Head coach: (Greece) Panagiotis Dilmperis
- Stadium: Salt Lake Stadium; Mohun Bagan Ground
- Indian Super League: 2nd
- Durand Cup: Runners-up
- Calcutta Football League: Champions
- IFA Shield: Champions
- Top goalscorer: League: Lee Erwin; Dejan Dražić (3 Goals Each); All: Manvir Singh (11 Goals)
- Highest home attendance: 29,797 vs Odisha; ISL
- Lowest home attendance: 18,005 vs Punjab; ISL
- Average home league attendance: 22,078
- Biggest win: 8–0 vs South United (Durand Cup)
- Biggest defeat: 1–4 vs East Bengal (Durand Cup)
Home colours	Away colours
- All statistics correct as of 5 November 2026.

The 2026–27 Mohun Bagan football season is the club's 137th year of existence and 31st consecutive year in the top tier national league of India, since the inception of national league in 1996. The 2026–27 season will run from 1st July 2026 until 31st May 2027 and it will be the club's 7th season in ISL.

In the previous season, the Mariners won the IFA Shield and came second in ISL only by goal difference. This is the first season since the modern day club legend, Dimitri Petratos, departed after his contract expired after four years (2022–26).

== Team Management ==
Position	Name
Head coach	(Greece) Panagiotis Dilmperis
Assistant coach	(Greece) Konstantinos Katsaras
Assistant coach	(India) Bastab Roy
Goalkeeping coach	(India) Abhra Mondal
Fitness coach	(Greece) Komninos Batzakas
Team Doctor	(India) Nelson Pinto
Physiotherapist	(India) Abhinandan Chatterjee
Physiotherapist	(India) Kaushik Bhuiya
Youth/Reserve team Head coach	(India) Bastab Roy
Team Analyst	(India) Anwit Banerjee
Team Manager	(India) Abhishek Bhattacharjee

== Squad ==
As of 5 November 2026

First team players
No.	Name	Position	Nat	Date of Birth (Age)	Date signed	Contract end	App	Goals	Assists	Transfer notes
Goalkeepers
1	Vishal Kaith	GK	(India)	22 July 1996 (age 30)	8 July 2022	2029	137	0	0	Signed from Chennaiyin FC
24	Syed Zahid	GK	(India)	16 April 2003 (age 23)	1 September 2023	2027	15	0	0	Signed from Indian Arrows
Defenders
2	Rahul Bheke	CB/RB	(India)	6 December 1990 (age 35)	18 June 2026	2027	18	1	1	Signed from Bengaluru FC
5	Mehtab Singh	CB/RB	(India)	5 June 1998 (age 28)	23 August 2025	2030	24	0	0	Signed from Mumbai City
15	Subhasish Bose (Captain)	CB/LB	(India)	15 August 1995 (age 31)	13 August 2020	2027	204 (Note: Has Previously played for Mohun Bagan (2016–17))	11	8	Signed from Mumbai City
21	Alberto Rodríguez	CB	(Spain)	31 December 1992 (age 33)	5 July 2024	2028	60	8	1	Signed from Persib Bandung
27	Abhishek Tekcham	LB/RB	(India)	2 January 2005 (age 21)	24 July 2025	2028	36	1	5	Signed From Punjab FC
40	Alex Saji	CB	(India)	9 May 2000 (age 26)	19 July 2026	2029	8	1	0	Signed from SC Delhi
44	Asish Rai	RB/RM	(India)	27 January 1999 (age 27)	20 June 2022	2027	102	2	8	Signed from Hyderabad FC
77	Thangjam Roshan Singh	LB	(India)	2 January 2007 (age 19)	1 June 2025	2027	10	0	1	Youth system
Midfielders
6	Anirudh Thapa	DM/CM	(India)	15 January 1998 (age 28)	23 June 2023	2028	92	6	9	Signed from Chennaiyin FC
8	Samir Zeljković	DM	(Bosnia and Herzegovina)	4 September 1997 (age 29)	11 June 2026	2028	11	1	0	Signed from Punjab FC
10	Miguel Figueira	AM/CM	(Brazil)	22 April 2000 (age 26)	10 July 2026	2028	7	1	2	Signed from East Bengal
16	Abhishek Suryavanshi	DM	(India)	12 March 2001 (age 25)	14 August 2021	2027	77	2	0	Youth system
18	Sahal Abdul Samad	AM	(India)	1 April 1997 (age 29)	14 July 2023	2028	88	16	21	Signed from Kerala Blasters
22	Deepak Tangri	CB/DM	(India)	1 February 1999 (age 27)	29 June 2021	2028	119	2	2	Signed from Chennaiyin FC
45	Apuia	DM/CM	(India)	7 October 2000 (age 26)	25 June 2024	2029	53	2	3	Signed from Mumbai City
81	Thumsol Tongsin	AM	(India)	28 February 2005 (age 21)	2023	2027	22	1	4	Youth system
Attackers
7	Liston Colaco	LM/LW	(India)	12 November 1998 (age 28)	9 June 2021	2027	164	34	32	Signed from Hyderabad FC
9	Lallianzuala Chhangte	RW	(India)	8 June 1997 (age 29)	July 2026	2029	12	3	3	Signed from Mumbai City
11	Manvir Singh	RW/RM	(India)	6 November 1995 (age 31)	25 August 2020	2027	182	44	29	Signed from FC Goa
14	Sayan Banerjee	LW	(India)	8 June 2003 (age 23)	4 June 2026	2028	17	2	6	Signed from East Bengal
17	Kiyan Nassiri	LW	(India)	17 November 2000 (age 26)	4 July 2025	2028	107 (Note: Has Previously played for Mohun Bagan (2019–2024))	17	14	Signed from Chennaiyin FC
19	Lee Erwin	ST	(Scotland)	19 March 1994 (age 32)	30 August 2026	2027	9	5	1	Signed from Al-Faisaly SC
29	Jamie Maclaren	ST	(Australia)	29 July 1993 (age 33)	22 July 2024	2028	54	28	5	Signed from Melbourne City
71	Dejan Dražić	LW	(Serbia)	26 September 1995 (age 31)	19 July 2026	2028	13	3	4	Signed from FC Goa
72	Suhail Bhat	ST	(India)	8 April 2005 (age 21)	1 June 2023	2028	75	29	1	Youth system

== Transfers ==
=== Contract Extension ===
Position	Name	Year
Centre Back	(Spain) Alberto Rodríguez	2028
Midfielder	(India) Deepak Tangri	2028

=== In ===
No.	Pos.	Name	Signed From	Fee	Date
14	FW	(India) Sayan Banerjee	(India) East Bengal FC	Free Transfer	4 June 2026
34	DM	(India) Tanmoy Ghosh	(India) Goalorious Mothers	Free Transfer	1 June 2026
3	RB	(India) Raj Basfore	(India) Chennaiyin FC	Free Transfer	1 June 2026
8	CDM	(Bosnia and Herzegovina) Samir Zeljković	(India) Punjab FC	Free Transfer	11 June 2026
2	CB/RB	(India) Rahul Bheke	(India) Bengaluru FC	Free Transfer	18 June 2026
10	MF	(Brazil) Miguel Figueira	(India) East Bengal FC	Free Transfer	10 July 2026
71	FW	(Serbia) Dejan Dražić	(India) FC Goa	Free Transfer	19 July 2026
40	DF	(India) Alex Saji	(India) SC Delhi	Undisclosed Fee	19 July 2026
9	FW	(India) Lallianzuala Chhangte	(India) Mumbai City	Free Transfer	1 August 2026
19	FW	(Scotland) Lee Erwin	(Jordan) Al-Faisaly SC	Free Transfer	30 August 2026

=== Out ===
Exit Date	No.	Pos.	Name	Signed to	Fee
1 June 2025	4	RB	(India) Amey Ranawade	(India) Kerala Blasters	Loan Return
11 June 2026	5	CB	(Scotland) Tom Aldred	(Australia) Brisbane Roar	Free Transfer
9 July 2026	9	AM	(Australia) Dimi Petratos	(Australia) Sydney Olympic	Free Transfer
16 July 2026	33	DM	(India) Glan Martins	(India) Chennaiyin FC	Free Transfer
12 August 2026	35	FW	(Australia) Jason Cummings	(Vietnam) Ho Chi Minh City	Free Transfer
14 August 2026	32	CB	(India) Dippendu Biswas	(India) Chennaiyin FC	Free Transfer
30 August 2026	10	LW	(Brazil) Robinho	(Bangladesh) Bashundhara Kings	Free Transfer

== Competitions ==
Competition	First match	Last match	Starting round	Final position	Record							
Competition	First match	Last match	Starting round	Final position	Pld	W	D	L	GF	GA	GD	Win %
Durand Cup	25 July 2026	23 August 2026	Group Stage	Runners-up	6	3	2	1	17	5	+12	50.00
ISL	12 October 2026	May 2027	Matchday 1	TBD	6	5	0	1	10	6	+4	83.33
Federation Cup	April 2027	2027		TBD	0	0	0	0	0	0	+0	—
CFL	13 July 2026	19 September 2026	League phase	Champions	14	9	3	2	35	10	+25	64.29
IFA Shield	23 September 2026	8 October 2026	Group Stage	Champions	4	2	2	0	8	1	+7	50.00
Total					30	19	7	4	70	22	+48	63.33

Source: Competitions

== Matches ==
=== Durand Cup ===
Group stage

Pos	Team	Pld	W	D	L	GF	GA	GD	Pts	Qualification	MBG	EAB	SOU	CIS
1	Mohun Bagan (H)	3	3	0	0	15	0	+15	9	knockout stage		1–0	8–0	6–0
2	East Bengal (H)	3	2	0	1	13	1	+12	6	knockout stage			5–0	8–0
3	South United	3	1	0	2	2	13	−11	3					2–0
4	CISF Protectors	3	0	0	3	0	16	−16	0					

Source: DFTS
Legend: Blue = home team win; Yellow = draw; Red = away team win.
Rules for classification: Group stage tiebreakers
(H) Hosts

25 July 2026^{(KD)} Group stage	East Bengal	0–1	Mohun Bagan	Kolkata, West Bengal
17:00 IST	Edmund (yellow card) 45'	Report	Kiyan (yellow card) 36'; Sahal 54'; Bose (yellow card) 74'	Stadium: Vivekananda Yuba Bharati Krirangan; Attendance: 32,870; Referee: Lakshay; Man of the Match: Vishal Kaith (Mohun Bagan)

4 August 2026 Group stage	Mohun Bagan	8–0	South United	Kolkata, West Bengal
19:00 IST	Manvir 4', 22', 60'; Alberto 10'; Bheke 19' , (yellow card) 36'; Noel 70' (o.g.); Suhail 90', 90+1'	Report		Stadium: Vivekananda Yuba Bharati Krirangan; Attendance: 4,256; Referee: Jehrul Islam; Man of the Match: Manvir Singh (Mohun Bagan)

10 August 2026 Group stage	Mohun Bagan	6–0	CISF Protectors	Kolkata, West Bengal
16:00 IST	Sahal 17', 19', 37'; Manvir 24'; Thapa (yellow card) 35'; Mehtab (yellow card) 46'; Maclaren 69'; Tekcham 73'	Report	Sonu (yellow card) 5'	Stadium: Kishore Bharati Krirangan; Attendance: 3,547; Referee: Jarvish Macwan; Man of the Match: Sahal Abdul Samad (Mohun Bagan)

Knockout stage

17 August 2026 Knockout stage	Mohun Bagan	1–1 (9–8 p)	Jamshedpur	Kolkata, West Bengal
16:00 IST	Sahal 2'; Alberto (yellow card) 54'	Report	Rashithoi (yellow card) 30'; Devendra 45+1'	Stadium: Vivekananda Yuba Bharati Krirangan; Attendance: 4,105; Referee: Lakshay; Man of the Match: Vishal Kaith (Mohun Bagan)
	Penalties
	Bheke (penalty scored); Zeljković (penalty scored); Bose (penalty scored); Maclaren (penalty scored); Kiyan (penalty scored); Thapa (penalty scored); Alberto (penalty scored); Suhail (penalty scored); Tekcham (penalty scored)		Hriata (penalty scored); Fernandes (penalty scored); Aman (penalty scored); Abhishek (penalty scored); Halder (penalty scored); Lakra (penalty scored); Chaudhari (penalty scored); Barla (penalty scored); Mama (penalty missed)

20 August 2026 Knockout stage	Mohun Bagan	0–0 (4–3 p)	North East United	Shillong, Meghalaya
19:00 IST	Apuia (yellow card) 39'; Sahal (yellow card) 42'; Bose (yellow card) 79'; Tekcham (yellow card) 81'	Report	Yadav (yellow card) 90+1'; González (yellow card) 90+3'	Stadium: Jawaharlal Nehru Stadium; Attendance: 11,365; Referee: Harish Kundu; Man of the Match: Liston Colaco (Mohun Bagan)
	Penalties
	Bheke (penalty scored); Bose (penalty scored); Colaco (penalty scored); Maclaren (penalty scored)		Ninković (penalty scored); Ajaraie (penalty scored); González (penalty scored); Yadav (penalty missed); Gogoi (penalty missed)

23 August 2026^{(KD)} Final	East Bengal	4–1	Mohun Bagan	Kolkata, West Bengal
17:00 IST	Bipin 10'; Edmund 12', 22', 44'; Ramírez (yellow card) 29'; Jeakson (yellow card) 60'	Report	Manvir 33'; Bose (yellow card) 43'; Apuia (yellow card) 56'; Tekcham (yellow card) 59'; Alberto (yellow card) 90+5'	Stadium: Vivekananda Yuba Bharati Krirangan; Attendance: 60,129; Referee: Aditya Purkayastha; Man of the Match: Edmund Lalrindika (East Bengal FC)

=== IFA Shield ===
Group stage

Pos	Team	Pld	W	D	L	GF	GA	GD	Pts	Qualification	MBG	NEU	SDC
1	Mohun Bagan (H)	2	1	1	0	7	1	+6	4	Advance to the Semi-Final		1–1	6–0
2	NorthEast United	2	1	1	0	4	1	+3	4	Advance to the Semi-Final			3–0
3	Sreenidi Deccan	2	0	0	2	0	9	−9	0				

Source: IFA
Legend: Blue = home team win; Yellow = draw; Red = away team win.
Rules for classification: Group stage tiebreakers
(H) Hosts

Semi-finals
4 October – Kishore Bharati
Mohun Bagan (p)	0 (4)
Punjab	0 (3)
5 October – Kishore Bharati
East Bengal	7
NorthEast United	2

Final
8 October – Yuba Bharati
Mohun Bagan	1
East Bengal	0

23 September 2026 1	Sreenidi Deccan	0–6	Mohun Bagan	Kolkata, India
15:00 IST	Kotal (yellow card) 43'; Gassama (yellow card) 51'; Chhetri (yellow card) 86'; Kumar (yellow card) 90+3'	Report	Suryavanshi 9'; Chhangte 44', 52', 57'; Sandeep Malik 80'; Erwin 83'	Stadium: Mohun Bagan Ground; Attendance: 789; Referee: Surojit Das; Man of the Match: Lallianzuala Chhangte (Mohun Bagan)

29 September 2026 2	North East United	1–1	Mohun Bagan	Kolkata, India
15:00 IST	Ethyan 71'; Ninković (yellow card) 88'	Report	Erwin 49'; Miguel (penalty missed) 70'; Bose (yellow card) 82'; Kiyan (yellow card) 88'	Stadium: Mohun Bagan Ground; Attendance: 2,764; Referee: Rabin Biswas; Man of the Match: Dipesh Chauhan (NorthEast United FC)

==== Semi Final ====
4 October 2026 Semi-Final	Mohun Bagan	0–0 (a.e.t.) (4–3 p)	Punjab	Kolkata, India
17:00 IST		Report	Arshdeep (yellow card) 9'	Stadium: Kishore Bharati Krirangan; Attendance: 7,067; Referee: Bimalendu Mondal; Man of the Match: Vishal Kaith (Mohun Bagan)
	Penalties
	Bheke (penalty scored); Bose (penalty scored); Alberto (penalty scored); Dražić (penalty missed); Miguel (penalty scored)		Messi Bouli (penalty scored); Arshvir (penalty scored); Shaiza (penalty missed); Yadav (penalty missed); Rishikanta (penalty scored)

==== Final ====
8 October 2026 Final	East Bengal	0–1	Mohun Bagan	Kolkata, India
18:15 IST	Mandi (yellow card) 58'; Jeakson (yellow card) 75'	Report	Chhangte (yellow card) 20'; Zeljković 45'; Alberto (yellow card) 82'; Kaith (yellow card) 90+2'	Stadium: Salt Lake Stadium; Attendance: 52,730; Referee: Pratik Mondal; Man of the Match: Dejan Dražić (Mohun Bagan)

=== Indian Super League ===
==== League table ====
Pos	Team	Pld	W	D	L	GF	GA	GD	Pts	Qualification
1	Mohun Bagan (Note: If Mohun Bagan SG, who are banned from AFC competitions until 2028–29 season. If they become Indian Super League champions, the ISL league runners-up will qualify for Challenge League preliminary stage.)	6	5	0	1	10	6	+4	15	League Shield Winners and qualification for the Challenge League preliminary stage and semi-finals
2	Bengaluru	5	4	1	0	10	4	+6	13	Qualification for the SAFF Club Championship and semi-finals
3	NorthEast United	6	3	2	1	8	3	+5	11	Qualification for the knockouts
4	Delhi	6	2	2	2	12	10	+2	8	Qualification for the knockouts
5	Punjab	5	2	2	1	8	7	+1	8	Qualification for the knockouts

Updated to match(es) played on 21 November 2026. Source: Indian Super League
Rules for classification: 1) points; 2) goal difference; 3) number of goals scored; 4) head-to-head points; 5) head-to-head goal difference; 6) head-to-head goals scored; 7) fair play ranking; 8) drawing of lots
(Note: Head-to-head record is used only after all the matches between the teams in question have been played).

==== Result summary ====
Overall								Home						Away					
Pld	W	D	L	GF	GA	GD	Pts	W	D	L	GF	GA	GD	W	D	L	GF	GA	GD
6	5	0	1	10	6	+4	15	3	0	0	6	3	+3	2	0	1	4	3	+1

==== Results by round ====
Round	1	2	3	4	5	6	7	8	9	10	11	12	13	14	15	16	17	18	19	20	21	22	23	24
Home/Away	A	A	H	H	H	A	A	A	H	A	A	H	A	A	H	H	H	H	H	A	H	A	H	A
Result	L	W	W	W	W	W																		
Position	12	5	5	1	2																			
Points	0	3	6	9	12	15																		

Updated to match(es) played on 10 October 2026. Source: Indian Super League
A = Away; H = Home; W = Win; D = Draw; L = Loss; P = Postponed

12 October 2026 1	NorthEast United	1–0	Mohun Bagan	Guwahati, India
19:30 IST	Macarton (yellow card) 13'; Pramveer (yellow card) 70'; Jithin 90+2' , (yellow card) 90+3'; Ajaraie (yellow card) 90+3'	Report; ISL Report	Suhail (yellow card) 90+4'	Stadium: Indira Gandhi Athletic Stadium; Attendance: 9,637; Referee: Aditya Purkayastha; Man of the Match: Jithin M. S. (NorthEast United FC)

16 October 2026 2	SC Delhi	1–2	Mohun Bagan	Delhi, India
19:30 IST	Hnamte 23'; Viáfara (yellow card) 68'; Clarence (yellow card) 89'	Report; ISL Report	Tekcham (yellow card) 15'; Rodríguez (yellow card) 28'; Erwin 56'; Miguel (yellow card) 57', (goal) 60'; Apuia (yellow card) 70'	Stadium: Jawaharlal Nehru Stadium, Delhi; Attendance: 14,791; Referee: Jehrul Islam; Man of the Match: Miguel Figueira (Mohun Bagan)

26 October 2026 3	Mohun Bagan	1–0	Chennaiyin	Kolkata, India
19:30 IST	Manvir 86'; Colaco (yellow card) 87'	Report; ISL Report		Stadium: Vivekananda Yuba Bharati Krirangan; Attendance: 18,432; Referee: Shantan Agarwal; Man of the Match: Madih Talal (Chennaiyin FC)

31 October 2026 4	Mohun Bagan	2–1	Punjab	Kolkata, India
19:30 IST	Manvir (yellow card) 12'; Erwin 18'; Dražić 42'; Tangri (yellow card) 80'; Alberto (yellow card) 90+6'	Report; ISL Report	Bouli (yellow card) 1'; Planas 3'; Varghese (yellow card) 71'; Lhungdim (yellow card) 76'; Malsa (yellow card) 90+7'	Stadium: Vivekananda Yuba Bharati Krirangan; Attendance: 18,005; Referee: Crystal John; Man of the Match: Lee Erwin (Mohun Bagan)

5 November 2026 5	Mohun Bagan	3–2	Odisha	Kolkata, India
19:30 IST	Alberto (yellow card) 8'; Dražić 47', 74'; Zeljković (yellow card) 66'; Erwin 87'	Report; ISL Report	Eid 52'; Everton 79'	Stadium: Vivekananda Yuba Bharati Krirangan; Attendance: 29,797; Referee: TV Nagvenkar; Man of the Match: Dejan Dražić (Mohun Bagan)

22 November 2026 6	Churchill Brothers	1–2	Mohun Bagan	Panaji, India
19:30 IST	Melroy (yellow card) 33'; Kingslee (yellow card) 45'; Salou (yellow card) 72'; Gutiérrez 86' (pen.)	Report; ISL Report	Chhangte 27'; Thapa 62'	Stadium: Fatorda Stadium; Attendance: Aditya Purkayastha; Referee: 4,013; Man of the Match: Apuia (Mohun Bagan)

29 November 2026 7	East Bengal FC	–	Mohun Bagan	Kolkata, India
19:30 IST				Stadium: Vivekananda Yuba Bharati Krirangan; Man of the Match:

5 December 2026 8	Inter Kashi	–	Mohun Bagan	Pune, India
19:30 IST				Stadium: Shree Shiv Chhatrapati Sports Complex; Man of the Match:

9 December 2025 9	Mohun Bagan	–	Bengaluru	Kolkata, India
19:30 IST				Stadium: Vivekananda Yuba Bharati Krirangan; Man of the Match:

17 December 2026 10	Mumbai City	–	Mohun Bagan	Mumbai, India
17:00 IST				Stadium: Mumbai Football Arena; Man of the Match:

22 December 2026 11	Goa	–	Mohun Bagan	Panaji, India
19:30 IST				Stadium: Fatorda Stadium; Man of the Match:

10 January 2027 12	Mohun Bagan	–	Kerala Blasters	Kolkata, India
17:00 IST				Stadium: Vivekananda Yuba Bharati Krirangan; Man of the Match:

23 January 2027 13	Kerala Blasters	–	Mohun Bagan	Kerala, India
19:30 IST				Stadium: Jawaharlal Nehru Stadium; Man of the Match:

30 January 2027 14	Chennaiyin	–	Mohun Bagan	Chennai, India
17:00 IST				Stadium: Jawaharlal Nehru Stadium; Man of the Match:

6 February 2027 15	Mohun Bagan	–	Delhi	Kolkata, India
17:00 IST				Stadium: Vivekananda Yuba Bharati Krirangan; Man of the Match:

12 February 2027 16	Mohun Bagan	–	Goa	Kolkata, India
19:30 IST				Stadium: Vivekananda Yuba Bharati Krirangan; Man of the Match:

20 February 2027 17	Mohun Bagan	–	North East United	Kolkata, India
17:00 IST				Stadium: Vivekananda Yuba Bharati Krirangan; Man of the Match:

28 February 2027 18	Mohun Bagan	–	East Bengal FC	Kolkata, India
19:30 IST				Stadium: Vivekananda Yuba Bharati Krirangan; Man of the Match:

5 March 2027 19	Mohun Bagan	–	Inter Kashi	Kolkata, India
17:00 IST				Stadium: Vivekananda Yuba Bharati Krirangan; Man of the Match:

14 March 2027 20	Bengaluru	–	Mohun Bagan	Bengaluru, India
19:30 IST				Stadium: Sree Kanteerava Stadium; Man of the Match:

20 March 2027 21	Mohun Bagan	–	Churchill Brothers	Kolkata, India
17:00 IST				Stadium: Vivekananda Yuba Bharati Krirangan; Man of the Match:

4 April 2027 22	Punjab	–	Mohun Bagan	Delhi, India
17:00 IST				Stadium: Jawaharlal Nehru Stadium, Delhi; Man of the Match:

10 April 2027 23	Mohun Bagan	–	Mumbai City	Kolkata, India
19:30 IST				Stadium: Vivekananda Yuba Bharati Krirangan; Man of the Match:

April 2027 24	Odisha	–	Mohun Bagan	Odisha, India
: IST				Stadium: Kalinga Stadium; Man of the Match:

=== Calcutta Football League ===
==== Summary ====
Mohun Bagan participated in the 2026 CFL Premier Division and were potted into group A for the first phase of the tournament where twenty-six teams were divided into two groups of thirteen. Mohun Bagan fielded a squad composed of senior Indian players and the reserve squad led by head coach Bastob Roy for the Calcutta Football League.

==== Group A ====
Pos	Team	Pld	W	D	L	GF	GA	GD	Pts	Qualification	EAB	BHA	MBG	CCU	UKS	KMS	RLY	KID	BSS	PTC	GGT	BMS
1	East Bengal	11	8	3	0	27	7	+20	27	Super Six round		1–1	1–1	2–0	3–0	1–0	1–0	2–0	3–3	5–1	3–0	5–1
2	Bhawanipore	11	8	3	0	21	5	+16	27	Super Six round			2–1	2–1	4–0	1–0	2–2	0–0	3–0	2–0	1–0	3–0
3	Mohun Bagan SG	11	7	2	2	26	6	+20	23	Super Six round				0–1	1–0	3–0	3–1	1–1	w/o (Note: Behala SS gave walkover to Mohun Bagan SG, as a result they were handed a 0–3 loss.)	4–0	6–0	3–0
4	Calcutta Customs	11	5	3	3	24	12	+12	18						2–2	0–1	4–0	2–2	1–1	4–2	6–0	3–0
5	United Kolkata	11	4	4	3	22	16	+6	16							1–1	3–1	1–1	2–0	4–0	7–1	2–2

Source: The Away End
Legend: Blue = home team win; Yellow = draw; Red = away team win.
Rules for classification: 1) points; 2) head-to-head points; 3) head-to-head goal difference; 4) goal difference; 5) number of goals scored; 6) drawing of lots

13 July 2026 1	Mohun Bagan	4–0	Pathachakra	Kolkata, India
16:30 IST	Kiyan 21'; Suhail 65'; Raj Basfore (yellow card) 76'; Sayan Banerjee 90+2'; Bivan 90+5'	Report	Gokul Krishna (yellow card) 75'; Souvik (yellow card) 77'	Stadium: Mohun Bagan Ground; Attendance: 2,000; Referee: Rohan Das Gupta; Man of the Match: Sayan Banerjee (Mohun Bagan)

16 July 2026 2	Kidderpore	1–1	Mohun Bagan	Kolkata, India
15:00 IST	Biswajit Oraon (yellow card) 13'; Tuhin 48'; Suvam Sarkar (yellow card) 76'; Gourav Chunari (yellow card) 81'; Sourav Das (yellow card) 83'; Ismail (yellow card) 90+7'	Report	Sandeep 27', (yellow card) 81'; Dippendu Biswas (yellow card) 77'	Stadium: Mohun Bagan Ground; Attendance: 5,201; Referee: Tanmoy Dhar; Man of the Match: Raj Basfore (Mohun Bagan)

19 July 2026 3	Mohun Bagan	3–0	Kalighat MS	Kolkata, India
15:00 IST	Manvir 75' (pen.); Tanmoy Ghosh 82'; Dippendu 87'	Report		Stadium: Mohun Bagan Ground; Attendance: 2,526; Referee: Surojit Das; Man of the Match: Tanmoy Ghosh (Mohun Bagan)

28 July 2026 4	United Kolkata SC	0–1	Mohun Bagan	Kolkata, India
15:00 IST	Jobby (yellow card) 30' (yellow-red card) 90+6'; Amit Tudu (yellow card) 60' (yellow-red card) 87'; Narayan Das (yellow card) 68'	Report	Gogocha (yellow card) 19'; Suhail 43'; Sandeep (yellow card) 58'; Tanmoy (yellow card) 80'	Stadium: Mohun Bagan Ground; Attendance: 400; Referee: Dipu Roy; Man of the Match: Suhail Bhat (Mohun Bagan)

1 August 2026 5	Calcutta Customs	1–0	Mohun Bagan	Kolkata, India
15:00 IST	Monoranjan Singh (yellow card) 67'; Rahul Soren 86' (pen.); Somnath Dutta (yellow card) 90+2'	Report		Stadium: Mohun Bagan Ground; Attendance: 2,500; Referee: Suvajit Pramanik; Man of the Match: Rahul Soren (Calcutta Customs

7 August 2026 6	Mohun Bagan	1–2	Bhawanipore	Kolkata, India
15:00 IST	Umer Muhthar (yellow card) 39'; Dippendu (yellow card) 59'; Bivan 86'; Raj (yellow card) 89'	Report	Lalhmangaihsanga (yellow card) 45+3'; Sahil Harijan 80'; Robi Hansda 88'; Kuntal Pakira (yellow card) 90+4'	Stadium: Mohun Bagan Ground; Attendance: 350; Referee: Tarun Kumar Biswas; Man of the Match: Sahil Harijan; Bhawanipore FC

13 August 2026 7	Bidhannagar MSA	0–3	Mohun Bagan	Kolkata, India
15:00 IST	Milan Mandi (yellow card) 87'	Report	Kiyan 14', 45+2', 65'	Stadium: Mohun Bagan Ground; Attendance: 2,756; Referee: Debabrata Naskar; Man of the Match: Kiyan Nassiri (Mohun Bagan)

26 August 2026 8	George Telegraph	0–6	Mohun Bagan	Kolkata, India
15:00 IST	Ranojoy (yellow card) 22' (yellow-red card) 28'	Report	Suhail 13', 62', 74'; Saji 24'; Sandeep 46'; Abhishek 51'	Stadium: Mohun Bagan Ground; Attendance: 540; Referee: Shovan Roy; Man of the Match: Suhail Bhat (Mohun Bagan)

29 August 2026 9	Railway FC	1–3	Mohun Bagan	Kolkata, India
15:00 IST	Abhishek Aich (yellow card) 19'; Umesh Marandi 40'; Sk. Golap (yellow card) 70'; Sayan Das (yellow card) 73'	Report	Abhishek (yellow card); Manvir 45+4' (pen.); Robilal 51'; Suhail 79'	Stadium: Mohun Bagan Ground; Attendance: 1,200; Referee: Suvankar Das; Man of the Match: Sahal Abdul Samad (Mohun Bagan)

1 September 2026 10	Behala SS	0–3 w/o	Mohun Bagan	Kolkata, India
15:00 IST		Report		Stadium: Mohun Bagan Ground; Man of the Match:

7 September 2026 11	East Bengal	1–1	Mohun Bagan	Kolkata, India
15:00 IST	Chaku Mandi (yellow card) 33'; Bijay Murmu (yellow card) 45+2'; Md Bilal 65'; Jay Baz (yellow card) 83'	Report	Manvir 39'; Sayan (yellow card) 49'	Stadium: Barasat Stadium; Attendance: 10,500; Referee: Surojit Das; Man of the Match: Mohamed Bilal (East Bengal FC)

==== Super Six ====
Pos	Team	Pld	W	D	L	GF	GA	GD	Pts	Qualification	MBG	EAB	MDS	BHA	UTD	CLI
1	Mohun Bagan SG (C)	3	2	1	0	9	4	+5	7	Champions			3–2		1–1	5–1
2	East Bengal	3	1	2	0	8	1	+7	5				1–1		0–0	7–0
3	Mohammedan	3	1	1	1	5	4	+1	4					2–0		
4	Bhawanipore (Q)	3	1	1	1	3	2	+1	4	Eligible for I-League 3 (Note: East Bengal, Mohun Bagan SG, Mohammedan and United SC are already playing in national leagues while Coal India SPA is an institutional club making it ineligible to play in national leagues. Thus the next highest ranked team Bhawanipore is eligible for I-League 3.)					0–0	3–0
5	United SC	3	0	3	0	1	1	0	3							

Source: The Away End
Legend: Blue = home team win; Yellow = draw; Red = away team win.
Rules for classification: 1) points; 2) head-to-head points; 3) head-to-head goal difference; 4) goal difference; 5) number of goals scored; 6) drawing of lots
(C) Champions; (Q) Qualified for the phase indicated

10 September 2026 1	Coal India SPA	1–5	Mohun Bagan	Kolkata, India
15:00 IST	Irfan 75' (pen.); Pandit (yellow card) 90+1'	Report	Manvir 21', 44' (pen.); Sahal 35'; Sandeep 36'; Kiyan 39'; Tangri (yellow card) 90+2'	Stadium: Mohun Bagan Ground; Attendance: 504; Referee: Bimalendu Mondal; Man of the Match: Sandeep Malik (Mohun Bagan)

14 September 2026 2	United SC	1–1	Mohun Bagan	Kolkata, India
15:00 IST	Aman Yadav (yellow card) 21' (yellow-red card) 90+3'; Susovan Ghosh (yellow card) 29'; Amit Basak (yellow card) 71'; Sourav Samanta (yellow card) 89'; Sumay Shome 90+7'	Report	Mandi (yellow card) 74'; Sandeep 90+1'; Bose (yellow card) 90+11'	Stadium: Mohun Bagan Ground; Attendance: 3,000; Referee: Rohan Das Gupta; Man of the Match: Sandeep Malik (Mohun Bagan)

19 September 2026 3	Mohun Bagan	3–2	Mohammedan SC	Kolkata, India
15:00 IST	Sahal 26', 70'; Tangri (yellow card) 37'; Deeprobhat (red card) 59'; Mandi (yellow card) 68'; Sayan 74'; Suryavanshi (yellow card) 90+1'	Report	Lalremsanga 42'; Mahitosh Roy 63' (pen.); Rahul Naskar (yellow card) 72'	Stadium: Barasat Stadium; Attendance: 7,100; Referee: Pratik Mondal; Man of the Match: Sahal Abdul Samad (Mohun Bagan)

== Player Statistics ==
=== Appearances ===
Players with no appearances are not included in the list.

As of 5 November 2026

Appearances for Mohun Bagan in 2026–27 season
No.	Pos.	Nat.	Name	Durand Cup		Indian Super League		Federation Cup		IFA Shield		Calcutta League		Total	
No.	Pos.	Nat.	Name	Apps	Starts	Apps	Starts	Apps	Starts	Apps	Starts	Apps	Starts	Apps	Starts
Goalkeepers
1	GK	(India)	Vishal Kaith	5	5	5	5	—		4	4	1	1	15	15
24	GK	(India)	Syed Zahid	1	1	—		—		—		7	6	8	7
61	GK	(India)	Deeprobhat Ghosh	—		—		—		—		6	6	6	6
Defenders
2	CB / RB	(India)	Rahul Bheke	5	5	4	4	—		4	4	5	5	18	18
3	RB	(India)	Raj Basfore	—		—		—		—		13	13	13	13
5	RB	(India)	Abhishek Mondal	—		—		—		—		1	0	1	0
5	RB	(India)	Mehtab Singh	2	2	4	4	—		1	1	1	1	8	8
15	LB	(India)	Subhasish Bose	6	6	4	2	—		3	3	5	5	18	16
20	RB	(India)	Sahajid Gazi	—		—		—		—		4	3	4	3
21	CB	(Spain)	Alberto Rodríguez	6	5	5	5	—		4	4	—		15	14
27	LB	(India)	Abhishek Tekcham	6	6	5	5	—		1	1	3	1	15	13
30	LB	(India)	Pallujam Rohan Singh	—		—		—		—		1	0	1	0
32	CB	(India)	Dippendu Biswas	—		—		—		—		6	6	6	6
40	CB	(India)	Alex Saji	1	0	—		—		2	0	5	4	8	4
44	CB	(India)	Asish Rai	2	0	—		—		2	1	—		4	1
66	LB	(India)	Robilal Mandi	—		—		—		—		12	10	12	10
71	RB	(India)	Subal Tudu	—		—		—		—		1	0	1	0
73	CB	(India)	Umer Muhthar	—		—		—		—		4	4	4	4
77	LB	(India)	Roshan Singh	—		—		—		—		2	1	2	1
Midfielders
6	MF	(India)	Anirudh Thapa	6	5	5	2	—		1	0	1	1	13	8
8	MF	(Bosnia and Herzegovina)	Samir Zeljković	3	2	5	4	—		3	3	—		11	9
10	MF	(Brazil)	Miguel Figueira	2	0	2	1	—		3	1	—		7	2
16	MF	(India)	Abhishek Suryavanshi	2	0	1	0	—		3	2	6	3	12	5
18	AM	(India)	Sahal Abdul Samad	6	5	4	2	—		1	1	6	6	17	14
22	MF	(India)	Deepak Tangri	4	2	3	2	—		4	4	4	4	15	12
34	MF	(India)	Tanmoy Ghosh	—		—		—		—		8	7	8	7
45	MF	(India)	Apuia	4	4	2	2	—		—		2	1	8	7
50	MF	(India)	Gogocha Chungkham	—		—		—		—		7	2	7	2
55	MF	(India)	Y. Rohit Singh	—		—		—		—		5	5	5	5
56	MF	(India)	Sandeep Malik	—		—		—		1	0	13	10	14	10
81	MF	(India)	Thumsol Tongsin	—		—		—		—		3	0	3	0
Forwards
7	LW	(India)	Liston Colaco	6	6	5	1	—		4	3	2	1	17	11
9	LW	(India)	Lallianzuala Chhangte	2	0	5	3	—		4	4	1	1	12	8
11	RW	(India)	Manvir Singh	6	6	5	3	—		1	0	6	5	18	14
14	LW	(India)	Sayan Banerjee	3	0	—		—		1	0	13	10	17	10
17	RW	(India)	Kiyan Nassiri	6	2	—		—		2	0	11	11	19	13
19	ST	(Scotland)	Lee Erwin	—		5	5	—		4	3	—		9	8
29	ST	(Australia)	Jamie Maclaren	4	1	1	0	—		2	1	—		7	2
62	FW	(India)	Bivan Jyoti Laskar	—		—		—		—		8	2	8	2
71	FW	(Serbia)	Dejan Dražić	4	3	5	5	—		4	4	—		13	12
72	FW	(India)	Suhail Ahmad Bhat	3	0	1	0	—		4	0	13	8	21	8
97	FW	(India)	Rajdeep Paul	—		—		—		—		2	0	2	0

=== Goals ===
As of 5 November 2026

Rank	No.	Nat.	Name	Durand Cup	Indian Super League	Federation Cup	IFA Shield	Calcutta League	Total
1	11	(India)	Manvir Singh	5	1	—	—	5	11
2	18	(India)	Sahal Abdul Samad	5	—	—	—	3	8
2	72	(India)	Suhail Bhat	2	—	—	—	6	8
3	17	(India)	Kiyan Nassiri	—	—	—	—	5	5
3	19	(Scotland)	Lee Erwin	—	3	—	2	—	5
3	56	(India)	Sandeep Malik	—	—	—	1	4	5
4	9	(India)	Lallianzuala Chhangte	—	—	—	3	—	3
4	71	(Serbia)	Dejan Dražić	—	3	—	—	—	3
5	14	(India)	Sayan Banerjee	—	—	—	—	2	2
5	16	(India)	Abhishek Suryavanshi	—	—	—	1	1	2
5	62	(India)	Bivan Jyoti Laskar	—	—	—	—	2	2
6	2	(India)	Rahul Bheke	1	—	—	—	—	1
6	8	(Bosnia and Herzegovina)	Samir Zeljković	—	—	—	1	—	1
6	10	(Brazil)	Miguel Figueira	—	1	—	—	—	1
6	21	(Spain)	Alberto Rodríguez	1	—	—	—	—	1
6	27	(India)	Abhishek Tekcham Singh	1	—	—	—	—	1
6	29	(Australia)	Jamie Maclaren	1	—	—	—	—	1
6	32	(India)	Dippendu Biswas	—	—	—	—	1	1
6	34	(India)	Tanmoy Ghosh	—	—	—	—	1	1
6	40	(India)	Alex Saji	—	—	—	—	1	1
6	66	(India)	Robilal Mandi	—	—	—	—	1	1
Own Goal(s)				1	—	—	—	—	1
Total				17	8	—	8	32	65

=== Assists ===
As of 5 November 2026

Rank	No.	Nat.	Name	Durand Cup	Indian Super League	IFA Shield	Federation Cup	Calcutta League	Total
1	17	(India)	Kiyan Nassiri	1	—	1	—	9	11
2	18	(India)	Sahal Abdul Samad	4	—	1	—	2	7
3	14	(India)	Sayan Banerjee	1	—	—	—	5	6
4	6	(India)	Anirudh Thapa	2	2	—	—	—	4
4	71	(Serbia)	Dejan Dražić	3	—	1	—	—	4
5	7	(India)	Liston Colaco	2	1	—	—	—	3
5	9	(India)	Lallianzuala Chhangte	—	1	1	—	1	3
5	27	(India)	Abhishek Singh	1	—	—	—	2	3
5	45	(India)	Apuia	1	1	—	—	1	3
6	10	(Brazil)	Miguel Figueira	—	—	2	—	—	2
6	29	(Australia)	Jamie Maclaren	—	—	2	—	—	2
6	62	(India)	Bivan Jyoti Laskar	—	—	—	—	2	2
6	66	(India)	Robilal Mandi	—	—	—	—	2	2
7	2	(India)	Rahul Bheke	—	1	—	—	—	1
7	19	(Scotland)	Lee Erwin	—	1	—	—	—	1
7	55	(India)	Y. Rohit Singh	—	—	—	—	1	1
7	56	(India)	Sandeep Malik	—	—	—	—	1	1
7	72	(India)	Suhail Bhat	—	—	—	—	1	1
Total				15	7	8	—	28	57

=== Cleansheets ===
As of 22 November 2026

Rank	No.	Nat.	Name	Durand Cup	Indian Super League	Federation Cup	IFA Shield	Calcutta League	Total
1	1	(India)	Vishal Kaith	3	1	—	3	1	8
2	24	(India)	Syed Zahid	1	—	—	—	4	5
Total				4	1	—	3	5	13

== Disciplinary record ==
As of 22 November 2026

No.	Nat.	Name	Durand Cup			Indian Super League			Federation Cup			IFA Shield			Calcutta League			Total		
No.	Nat.	Name	Yellow card	(yellow card) (yellow-red card)	Red card	Yellow card	(yellow card) (yellow-red card)	Red card	Yellow card	(yellow card) (yellow-red card)	Red card	Yellow card	(yellow card) (yellow-red card)	Red card	Yellow card	(yellow card) (yellow-red card)	Red card	Yellow card	(yellow card) (yellow-red card)	Red card
21	(Spain)	Alberto Rodríguez	2	0	0	3	0	0	—			1	0	0	—			6	0	0
15	(India)	Subhasish Bose	3	0	0	—			—			1	0	0	1	0	0	5	0	0
22	(India)	Deepak Tangri	—			1	0	0	—			—			2	0	0	3	0	0
27	(India)	Abhishek Tekcham	2	0	0	1	0	0	—			—			—			3	0	0
45	(India)	Apuia	2	0	0	1	0	0	—			—			—			3	0	0
3	(India)	Raj Basfore	—			—			—			—			2	0	0	2	0	0
16	(India)	Abhishek Suryavanshi	—			—			—			—			2	0	0	2	0	0
17	(India)	Kiyan Nassiri	1	0	0	—			—			1	0	0	—			2	0	0
32	(India)	Dippendu Biswas	—			—			—			—			2	0	0	2	0	0
56	(India)	Sandeep Malik	—			—			—			—			2	0	0	2	0	0
66	(India)	Robilal Mandi	—			—			—			—			2	0	0	2	0	0
1	(India)	Vishal Kaith	—			—			—			1	0	0	—			1	0	0
2	(India)	Rahul Bheke	1	0	0	—			—			—			—			1	0	0
5	(India)	Mehtab Singh	1	0	0	—			—			—			—			1	0	0
6	(India)	Anirudh Thapa	1	0	0	—			—			—			—			1	0	0
7	(India)	Liston Colaco	—			1	0	0	—			—			—			1	0	0
8	(Bosnia and Herzegovina)	Samir Zeljković	—			1	0	0	—			—			—			1	0	0
9	(India)	Lallianzuala Chhangte	—			—			—			1	0	0	—			1	0	0
10	(Brazil)	Miguel Figueira	—			1	0	0	—			—			—			1	0	0
11	(India)	Manvir Singh	—			1	0	0	—			—			—			1	0	0
14	(India)	Sayan Banerjee	—			—			—			—			1	0	0	1	0	0
18	(India)	Sahal Abdul Samad	1	0	0	—			—			—			—			1	0	0
34	(India)	Tanmoy Ghosh	—			—			—			—			1	0	0	1	0	0
50	(India)	Gogocha Chunkgam	—			—			—			—			1	0	0	1	0	0
61	(India)	Deeprobhat Ghosh	—			—			—			—			0	0	1	0	0	1
72	(India)	Suhail Bhat	—			1	0	0	—			—			—			1	0	0
73	(India)	Umer Muhthar	—			—			—			—			1	0	0	1	0	0
Total			14	0	0	11	0	0	—			5	0	0	17	0	1	47	0	1

== See also ==
- 2026–27 in Indian football
- 2026–27 Indian Super League
- 2026 Durand Cup
