= Dejan Dražić =

Serbian footballer (born 1995)

Personal information
- Date of birth: 26 September 1995 (age 31)
- Place of birth: Sombor, FR Yugoslavia
- Height: 1.78 m (5 ft 10 in)
- Positions: Left winger; attacking midfielder

Team information
- Current team: Mohun Bagan
- Number: 71

Youth career
- 2008–2010: Partizan
- 2010–2012: Teleoptik
- 2012–2013: Partizan

Senior career*
Years	Team	Apps	(Gls)
2013–2015	OFK Beograd	52	(9)
2015–2018	Celta Vigo	6	(0)
2016–2017	→ Real Valladolid (loan)	13	(0)
2017–2018	→ Celta Vigo B	40	(8)
2018–2022	Slovan Bratislava	62	(12)
2020	→ Zagłębie Lubin (loan)	10	(2)
2020–2021	→ Zagłębie Lubin (loan)	22	(1)
2022	→ Honvéd Budapest (loan)	10	(0)
2022–2023	Bodrumspor	4	(0)
2023	Radnik Surdulica	16	(0)
2023–2024	Ethnikos Achna	37	(6)
2024–2026	Goa	32	(7)
2026–	Mohun Bagan	5	(3)

International career
2013–2014	Serbia U19	8	(0)
2014–2015	Serbia U20	4	(0)
2016	Serbia U21	1	(0)
- * Club domestic league appearances and goals as of 26 October 2026

Dejan Dražić (Serbian Cyrillic: Дејан Дражић; born 26 September 1995) is a Serbian professional footballer who plays as a forward for Indian Super League club Mohun Bagan.

== Club career ==
=== OFK Beograd ===
Born in Sombor, Dražić spent his formative years with Teleoptik and Partizan. He subsequently went on trial at Russian club Rubin Kazan, before returning to Serbia and signing his first professional contract with OFK Beograd at the age of 18.

Dražić made his official debut for the club on 21 September 2013, coming on as a second-half substitute for Aleksandar Čavrić in a 0–2 away loss to his former side Partizan. He scored his first professional goal on 19 October, netting his team's first in a 2–3 home loss against Radnički Kragujevac.

On 9 November 2013, Dražić scored a brace in a 3–2 home win over Jagodina. He finished his first senior season with four league goals from 23 appearances.

=== Celta ===
On 7 August 2015, Dražić signed a five-year deal with Spanish La Liga side Celta de Vigo. He made his first appearance as a substitute, coming on for Theo Bongonda in a 1–1 draw against Eibar.

On 30 August 2016, Dražić was loaned to Real Valladolid in Segunda División, for one year.

== International career ==
Dražić represented Serbia at the 2014 UEFA Under-19 Championship, making three appearances.

== Career statistics ==
As of match played 5 November 2026

Appearances and goals by club, season and competition
Club	Season	League			National cup (Note: Includes Serbian Cup, Copa del Rey, Slovak Cup, Polish Cup, Magyar Kupa, Turkish Cup, Cypriot Cup, AIFF Super Cup, Durand Cup)		Continental		Other		Total	
Club	Season	Division	Apps	Goals	Apps	Goals	Apps	Goals	Apps	Goals	Apps	Goals
OFK Beograd	2013–14	Serbian SuperLiga	23	4	4	0	—		—		27	4
OFK Beograd	2014–15	Serbian SuperLiga	26	4	1	0	—		—		27	4
OFK Beograd	2015–16	Serbian SuperLiga	3	1	—		—		—		3	1
OFK Beograd	Total		52	9	5	0	—		—		57	9
Celta Vigo	2015–16	La Liga	6	0	4	1	—		—		10	1
Real Valladolid (loan)	2016–17	Segunda División	13	0	2	2	—		—		15	2
Celta Vigo B	2017–18	Segunda División B	40	8	—		—		—		40	8
Slovan Bratislava	2018–19	Slovak Super Liga	31	7	1	0	6 (Note: Appearance(s) in UEFA Europa League)	0	—		38	7
Slovan Bratislava	2019–20	Slovak Super Liga	16	1	4	6	8 (Note: Two appearances in UEFA Champions League, six appearances in UEFA Europa League)	0	—		28	7
Slovan Bratislava	2020–21	Slovak Super Liga	1	0	1	0	1	0	—		3	0
Slovan Bratislava	2021–22	Slovak Super Liga	14	4	3	5	8 (Note: One appearance in UEFA Champions League, two appearances in UEFA Europa League, five appearances in UEFA Europa Conference League)	0	—		25	9
Slovan Bratislava	Total		62	12	9	11	23	0	—		94	23
Zagłębie Lubin (loan)	2019–20	Ekstraklasa	10	2	—		—		—		10	2
Zagłębie Lubin (loan)	2020–21	Ekstraklasa	22	1	2	2	—		—		24	3
Zagłębie Lubin (loan)	Total		32	3	2	2	—		—		34	5
Honvéd Budapest (loan)	2021–22	Nemzeti Bajnokság I	10	0	2	0	—		—		12	0
Bodrumspor	2022–23	TFF First League	4	0	1	0	—		—		5	0
Radnik Surdulica	2022–23	Serbian SuperLiga	16	0	1	0	—		—		17	0
Ethnikos Achna	2023–24	Cypriot First Division	37	6	2	0	—		—		39	6
Goa	2024–25	Indian Super League	23	1	4	1	—		—		27	2
Goa	2025–26	Indian Super League	12	6	4	2	7 (Note: Appearances in AFC Champions League Two)	2	—		23	10
Goa	Total		35	7	8	3	7	2	0	0	50	12
Mohun Bagan	2026–27	Indian Super League	5	3	4	0	—		4 (Note: Appearances in 2026 IFA Shield)	0	13	3
Career total			312	48	40	19	30	2	4	0	386	69

== Honours ==
Mohun Bagan

• IFA Shield: 2026

Slovan Bratislava

- Slovak Super Liga: 2018–19, 2019–20
- Slovak Cup: 2019–20

Goa

- Bandodkar Trophy: 2024
- Indian Super Cup: 2025 April, 2025 Oct-Dec
