= Lee Erwin (footballer) =

Scottish footballer (born 1994)

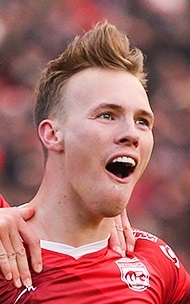
- Erwin with Tractor in 2019

Personal information
- Full name: Lee Harry Erwin
- Date of birth: 19 March 1994 (age 32)
- Place of birth: Bellshill, Scotland
- Height: 6 ft 2 in (1.88 m)
- Position: Striker

Team information
- Current team: Mohun Bagan
- Number: 19

Youth career
- 2006–2012: Motherwell

Senior career*
Years	Team	Apps	(Gls)
2012–2015	Motherwell	34	(5)
2013–2014	→ Arbroath (loan)	11	(8)
2015–2017	Leeds United	11	(0)
2015–2016	→ Bury (loan)	3	(0)
2016–2017	→ Oldham Athletic (loan)	34	(8)
2017–2018	Kilmarnock	34	(5)
2018–2019	Tractor	6	(4)
2019–2020	Ross County	21	(1)
2020–2022	St Mirren	30	(3)
2022	Haka	28	(20)
2022–2024	Al Ahed	30	(15)
2024–2025	HJK	11	(5)
2025	Gostivari	11	(3)
2025–2026	Al-Faisaly	20	(6)
2026–	Mohun Bagan	5	(3)

International career
2010–2011	Scotland U17	5	(1)
2012	Scotland U18	2	(0)
2012	Scotland U19	3	(0)
- * Club domestic league appearances and goals as of 16 October 2026

Lee Harry Erwin (born 19 March 1994) is a Scottish professional footballer who plays as a striker for Indian Super League club Mohun Bagan.

He is a Scottish youth international, having played at the under-17, under-18 and under-19 levels. Erwin has played for various sides in Scotland (namely Motherwell, Arbroath, Kilmarnock, Ross County and St Mirren) and England (Leeds United, Bury and Oldham Athletic). He also played in Iran for Tractor in 2018–19, in Finland for Haka in 2022 and in Lebanon for Ahed in 2022–23.

== Club career ==
=== Motherwell ===
Erwin is a product of the Motherwell Academy. In the summer of 2012, he signed a three-year contract with the club.

On 30 August 2013, Erwin joined Scottish League One club Arbroath on an initial one-month loan deal The following day, he scored twice on his debut as Arbroath beat Brechin City 2–1; the loan period was twice extended for a further month. He left the Gayfield Park club having scored eight goals in 11 appearances.

Shortly after returning to Motherwell, Erwin suffered a serious knee injury in a Scottish Youth Cup match against Kilmarnock that looked like it could end his involvement that season, although he returned to feature for the under-20s before the end of the season.

On 17 July 2014, Erwin made his senior debut for Motherwell as a substitute in a 2–2 draw against Stjarnan in the UEFA Europa League Second qualifying round first leg after being promoted to the first team by Manager Stuart McCall. He scored his first goal for the club on his league debut, a 1–0 win against St Mirren on 9 August 2014.

On 29 April 2015, with Erwin's contract set to expire at the end of the 2014–15 season, Motherwell offered him a new three-year deal, however Erwin advised he would be concentrating on helping keep Motherwell in the Scottish Premiership before looking into his own future. After becoming a regular starter under new manager Ian Baraclough, who played Erwin as a central striker, he ended the 2014–15 season in fine form, scoring five goals in his last nine games of the season.

Erwin scored on the 28 May for Motherwell in a 3–1 victory over Rangers at Ibrox in the first leg of the SPFL Premiership relegation/promotion playoff. On 31 May, during the second leg against Rangers, Erwin won a penalty which was converted by John Sutton to help Motherwell record a 3–0 win and a 6–1 on aggregate victory to stay in the Premiership. However, after the match, Erwin was involved in an incident when he went to shake Rangers defender Bilel Mohsni's hand, Mohsni refused, which resulted in Erwin pushing Mohsni who reacted by kicking, then punching, Erwin, causing a mass brawl between the players. On 1 June, Police Scotland announced an investigation into the incident at Fir Park. After initial reports that Erwin had been sent off after the game, the Scottish Football Association revealed that Erwin had only received a yellow card from referee Craig Thomson after the game for his part in the incident. He ended the season with six goals in 36 appearances (including the playoff matches) with 22 of the 36 games as a starter, and 14 coming off the bench.

On 2 June, Motherwell confirmed that they had offered Erwin a new three-year contract, but it was also reported that he had been offered a contract by Football League Championship club Leeds United, with compensation due to Motherwell should Erwin accept Leeds' offer instead.

=== Leeds United ===
After much speculation, on 10 June 2015 Erwin signed a three-year deal with Football League Championship club Leeds United. On 31 July, he was given the number 19 shirt for the upcoming 2015–16 season. After being an unused substitute under Uwe Rosler, in October 2015 Erwin moved to Bury on a 28-day loan. After playing three games, he returned to Leeds in November 2015, upon expiry of his loan, with new Leeds head coach Steve Evans stating he wanted to give Erwin a bigger opportunity to play. He made his Leeds debut on 21 November 2015, against Rotherham United in a controversial 1–0 defeat.

On 9 July 2016, Erwin signed for Oldham Athletic on a season-long loan. He scored his first goal for Oldham in a 3–2 loss against Shrewsbury Town on 3 September 2016.

In 40 appearances in all competitions for Oldham Athletic during the 2016–17 season, Erwin scored 10 goals (8 in the league), finishing the club's top goalscorer for the season.

Despite scoring four goals in his first two pre-season games back at Leeds United, on 13 July 2017 he and Toumani Diagouraga were deemed surplus to requirements at the club by new head coach Thomas Christiansen and were not named as part of Leeds' travelling squad to Kufstein in Austria.

=== Kilmarnock ===
Erwin signed a two-year contract with Kilmarnock in July 2017. He scored on his debut against Dumbarton on 21 July 2017, in the Scottish League Cup.

=== Tractor ===
Erwin moved to Iranian football in August 2018, signing with Tractor. On 9 November 2018, in Tractor's game against Zob Ahan, Erwin came on after 53 minutes and got the fastest hat-trick in Iran Pro League history in seven minutes.

=== Ross County ===
On 23 July 2019, Erwin signed for Scottish Premiership side Ross County on a two-year deal. He made his debut against Partick Thistle in the Scottish League Cup in a 3–2 defeat. His first goal for the club would come against Kilmarnock in the Scottish Premiership, a late winner in a 1–0 victory.

=== St Mirren ===
On 10 September 2020, Erwin signed a two-year contract with Scottish Premiership side St Mirren after the striker was allowed to leave Ross County due to 'family reasons'. On 17 February 2022, St Mirren confirmed that Erwin had left the club after his contract was terminated by mutual consent.

=== Haka ===
Later that same day, Erwin signed a one-year deal with Haka in Finnish top-tier Veikkausliiga. Erwin recorded a successful 2022 season, scoring 20 goals in the league and winning the golden boot. His goals helped Haka finish 4th in Veikkausliiga and eventually qualify for the 2023–24 UEFA Europa Conference League qualifiers.

=== Ahed ===
In November 2022, Lebanese Premier League club Ahed announced the signing of Erwin. Ahed announced departure of Erwin in June 2024.

=== HJK ===
On 2 July 2024, Erwin returned to Finland and signed with reigning champions HJK Helsinki for the rest of the 2024 season. Erwin has yet to start a league game in which he has not scored, recording five goals in eight appearances. Erwin scored his first brace in the Conference League Play off round first leg match against Klaksvik, which ended 2–2. He also scored HJK's 2–1 stoppage time tie-winning goal in the second leg, clinching his team a spot in the Conference League. Erwins contract with HJK expired on 31 December 2024.

=== Gostivari ===
In February 2025, Macedonian First League club Gostivari announced the signing of Erwin.

=== Al-Faisaly ===
In June 2025, Erwin joined Jordanian Pro League club Al-Faisaly.

=== Mohun Bagan ===
In September 2026, Erwin joined Indian Super League club Mohun Bagan. He scored on his debut coming off the bench in opening match of IFA Shield, one of the oldest competitions in Club Football, against Sreenidi Deccan at Mohun Bagan Ground.

== International career ==
Erwin has been capped by Scotland at under-17, under-18 and under-19 levels.

== Personal life ==
His father, Harry, made 351 appearances in the Scottish Football League, playing for Airdrie, Stenhousemuir, Alloa and East Stirlingshire between 1978 and 1991.

== Career statistics ==
As of match played 5 November 2026

Appearances and goals by club, season and competition
Club	Season	League			National cup (Note: Includes Scottish Cup, FA Cup, Iranian Hazfi Cup, Suomen Cup, Lebanese FA Cup, Macedonian Cup)		League cup (Note: Includes Scottish League Cup, EFL League Cup, Finnish League Cup and Lebanese Federation Cup)		Continental		Other		Total	
Club	Season	Division	Apps	Goals	Apps	Goals	Apps	Goals	Apps	Goals	Apps	Goals	Apps	Goals
Motherwell	2013–14	Scottish Premiership	0	0	0	0	0	0	0	0	—		0	0
Motherwell	2014–15	Scottish Premiership	34	5	1	0	0	0	1 (Note: Appearance in UEFA Europa League)	0	2 (Note: Appearances in Scottish Premiership play-offs)	1	38	6
Motherwell	Total		34	5	1	0	0	0	1	0	2	1	38	6
Arbroath (loan)	2013–14	Scottish League One	11	8	0	0	0	0	—		0	0	11	8
Leeds United	2015–16	Championship	11	0	1	0	0	0	—		0	0	12	0
Leeds United	2016–17	Championship	0	0	0	0	0	0	—		0	0	0	0
Leeds United	Total		11	0	1	0	0	0	—		0	0	12	0
Bury (loan)	2015–16	League One	3	0	0	0	0	0	—		0	0	3	0
Oldham Athletic (loan)	2016–17	League One	34	8	2	0	2	0	—		2 (Note: Appearances in the EFL Trophy)	2	40	10
Kilmarnock	2017–18	Scottish Premiership	34	5	4	1	2	1	—		—		40	7
Kilmarnock	2018–19	Scottish Premiership	0	0	0	0	4	1	—		—		4	1
Kilmarnock	Total		34	5	4	1	6	2	—		—		44	8
Tractor	2018–19	Persian Gulf Pro League	6	4	1	0	—		—		—		7	4
Ross County	2019–20	Scottish Premiership	17	1	1	0	1	0	—		—		19	1
Ross County	2020–21	Scottish Premiership	4	0	0	0	0	0	—		—		4	0
Ross County	Total		21	1	1	0	1	0	—		—		23	1
St Mirren	2020–21	Scottish Premiership	27	3	3	0	5	0	—		—		35	3
St Mirren	2021–22	Scottish Premiership	3	0	0	0	4	1	—		—		7	1
St Mirren	Total		30	3	3	0	9	1	—		—		42	4
Haka	2022	Veikkausliiga	28	20	4	1	3	0	—		—		35	21
Al Ahed	2022–23	Lebanese Premier League	10	6	3	2	—		—		—		13	8
Al Ahed	2023–24	Lebanese Premier League	20	9	1	0	4	5	8 (Note: Appearances in AFC Champions League Two)	3	1 (Note: Appearance in Lebanese Super Cup)	0	34	17
Al Ahed	Total		30	15	4	2	4	5	8	3	1	0	47	25
HJK	2024	Veikkausliiga	11	5	0	0	0	0	12 (Note: Two appearances and one goal in UEFA Champions League, ten appearances and five goals in UEFA Conference League)	6	—		23	11
Gostivari	2024–25	Macedonian First League	11	3	1	0	—		—		—		12	3
Al-Faisaly	2025–26	Jordanian Pro League	20	6	2	3	—		—		—		22	9
Mohun Bagan	2026–27	Indian Super League	5	3	0	0	0	0	—		4 (Note: Appearances in IFA Shield)	2	9	5
Career total			289	86	24	7	25	8	21	9	9	5	368	115

== Honours ==
Mohun Bagan

• IFA Shield : 2026

Ahed

- Lebanese Premier League: 2022–23
- Lebanese Federation Cup: 2023
- Lebanese FA Cup runner-up: 2022–23, 2023–24
- Lebanese Super Cup runner-up: 2023
- AFC Champions League Two runner-up: 2023–24

Individual

- Veikkausliiga Player of the Year: 2022
- Veikkausliiga Striker of the Year: 2022
- Veikkausliiga Team of the Year: 2022
- Veikkausliiga top goalscorer: 2022
- Veikkausliiga Player of the Month: September 2022, October 2022
- Lebanese Federation Cup top goalscorer: 2023
