= Subhasish Bose =

Indian footballer (born 1995)

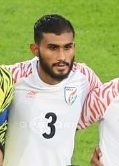
- Bose at the 2019 AFC Asian Cup

Personal information
- Full name: Subhasish Bose
- Date of birth: 18 August 1995 (age 31)
- Place of birth: Subhashgram, Kolkata, West Bengal, India
- Height: 1.86 m (6 ft 1 in)
- Positions: Left-back; centre-back

Team information
- Current team: Mohun Bagan
- Number: 15

Youth career
- 2012–2016: Pune
- 2016: → Churchill Brothers (loan)

Senior career*
Years	Team	Apps	(Gls)
2016	Sporting Goa	11	(2)
2016–2017	Mohun Bagan	10	(0)
2017–2018	Bengaluru	18	(0)
2018–2020	Mumbai City	34	(1)
2020–	Mohun Bagan	115	(9)

International career^{‡}
2017–	India	45	(0)
Medal record
Men's football
Representing India
SAFF Championship
Winner	2021 Maldives
Winner	2023 India
- * Club domestic league appearances and goals as of 12 April 2025 ‡ National team caps and goals as of 22:00, 3 November 2025 (UTC)

Subhasish Bose (Bengali: শুভাশীষ বসু; born 18 August 1995) is an Indian professional footballer who plays as a defender for Indian Super League club Mohun Bagan, which he captains, and the India national team.

== Club career ==
Bose made his professional debut for Sporting Goa in the I-League on 6 February 2016 against Bengaluru. He came on as a 57th-minute substitute for Nicholas Fernandes as Sporting Goa won 2–1.

On 8 July 2016, it was announced that Bose had signed for Sporting Goa on a permanent basis from Pune.

On 23 July 2017, he was drafted to Bengaluru for the 2017–18 Indian Super League season. Over the season he became an important players in Albert Roca's squad alongside Rahul Bheke. His efforts as a left-back earned him a spot on Stephen Constantine's list of probables for India's upcoming AFC Cup qualifier clash against the Kyrgyz Republic.

Bose signed for Mumbai City on a two-year contract ahead of the 2018–19 season.

=== Mohun Bagan SG ===
On 13 August 2020, he signed a five-year contract with Mohun Bagan SG.

== Personal life ==
Subhasish married Indian actor-model Kasturi Chhetri in 2021, after being in a relationship for several years.

== Career statistics ==
=== Club ===
As of 5 November 2026

Club	Season	League			Super Cup		Durand Cup		AFC		Other		Total	
Club	Season	Division	Apps	Goals	Apps	Goals	Apps	Goals	Apps	Goals	Apps	Goals	Apps	Goals
Sporting Goa	2015–16	I-League	11	2	—		—		—		4 (Note: Appearances in Federation Cup)	1	15	3
Sporting Goa	Total		11	2	0	0	0	0	0	0	4	1	15	3
Mohun Bagan	2016–17	I-League	10	0	—		—		4 (Note: Appearance in AFC Cup)	0	5	0	19	0
Mohun Bagan	2020–21	Indian Super League	20	0	—		—		–		—		20	0
Mohun Bagan	2021–22	Indian Super League	22	1	—		—		4	1	—		26	2
Mohun Bagan	2022–23	Indian Super League	23	1	3	0	4	0	6	1	1 (Note: Appearance in Indian club qualifiers for 2023–24 AFC competitions)	0	37	2
Mohun Bagan	2023–24	Indian Super League	25	1	0	0	5	0	7	0	—		37	1
Mohun Bagan	2024–25	Indian Super League	25	6	0	0	4	0	1 (Note: Appearance(s) in AFC Champions League Two)	0	—		30	6
Mohun Bagan	2025–26	Indian Super League	12	0	2	0	0	0	1	0	2 (Note: Appearance(s) in IFA Shield)	0	17	0
Mohun Bagan	2026–27	Indian Super League	4	0	0	0	6	0	—		8 (Note: 5 Appearance(s) in 2026 Calcutta League and 3 Appearance(s) in 2026 IFA Shield)	0	18	0
Mohun Bagan	Total		141	9	5	0	19	0	23	2	16	0	204	11
Bengaluru	2017–18	Indian Super League	18	0	4	0	—		12	0	—		34	0
Bengaluru	Total		18	0	4	0	0	0	12	0	0	0	34	0
Mumbai City	2018–19	Indian Super League	16	0	0	0	—		—		—		16	0
Mumbai City	2019–20	Indian Super League	18	1	0	0	—		—		—		18	1
Mumbai City	Total		34	1	0	0	—		—		—		34	1
Career total			204	12	9	0	19	0	35	2	20	1	287	15

=== International ===
As of 3 November 2025

National team	Year	Apps	Goals
India	2018	11	0
India	2019	7	0
India	2021	9	0
India	2022	2	0
India	2023	6	0
India	2024	7	0
India	2025	3	0
Total		45	0

== Honours ==
=== Club Level ===
Mohun Bagan

- Indian Super League Shield: 2023–24, 2024–25
- Indian Super League Cup: 2022–23, 2024–25
- Durand Cup: 2023
- IFA Shield: 2025, 2026
- Calcutta Football League: 2026

=== National Level ===
India

- SAFF Championship: 2021, 2023
- Intercontinental Cup: 2018, 2023
