= Abhishek Singh Tekcham =

Indian footballer

Abhishek Singh
Personal information
- Full name: Abhishek Singh Tekcham
- Date of birth: 2 January 2005 (age 21)
- Place of birth: Manipur, India
- Height: 1.70 m (5 ft 7 in)
- Position: Left-back

Team information
- Current team: Mohun Bagan

Youth career
- 2010–2019: Minerva Academy

Senior career*
Years	Team	Apps	(Gls)
2019–2022	Punjab B	4	(2)
2022–2025	Punjab	38	(1)
2025–	Mohun Bagan	13	(0)

International career^{‡}
2022–2024	India U20	5	(0)
2024–2025	India U23	8	(0)
2025–	India	7	(0)
- * Club domestic league appearances and goals as of 17:38, 10 March 2025 (UTC) ‡ National team caps and goals as of 22:00, 6 October 2026 (UTC)

Abhishek Singh Tekcham (Meitei: Tekcham Abhishek Singh, born 2 January 2005) is an Indian professional footballer who plays as a defender for Indian Super League club Mohun Bagan and the India national team.

== Club career ==
Abhishek Singh started his career with Minerva Academy, based in Punjab. In 2020, Minerva Academy parted away with Punjab FC. Some players from Minerva moved to Punjab FC, including Abhishek Singh before the 2021–22 I-League. He won the 2022–23 I-League, the then second division league of Indian football, with Punjab FC.

== International career ==
Singh was part of the India under-20 squad for the 2023 AFC U-20 Asian Cup qualification and played all the three matches of the qualifiers. On 11 March 2025, the then India national team head coach Manolo Márquez announced Singh's inclusion in the squad for the third round of AFC Asian Cup qualification matches. He made his debut in a friendly against the Maldives before the qualifiers.

On 3 October 2026, in an international friendly between Brazil and India, Singh received widespread praise for effectively checking Real Madrid winger, the Brazilian Vinicius Jr. for 45 minutes, rendering him inactive for the entire first half.

== Career statistics ==
=== Club ===
As of 8 October 2026

Club	Season	League			Super Cup		Continental		Durand Cup		Other(s)		Total	
Club	Season	Division	Apps	Goals	Apps	Goals	Apps	Goals	Apps	Goals	Apps	Goal	Apps	Goal
Punjab B	2019–20	I-League 2nd Division	1	0	–								1	0
Punjab B	2024	RFDL	3	2	–								3	2
Punjab B	Total		4	2	0	0	0	0	0	0	0	0	4	2
Punjab	2022–23	I-League	4	1	–								4	1
Punjab	2023–24	Indian Super League	12	0	3	0	–		1	0	-		16	0
Punjab	2024–25	Indian Super League	22	0	2	0	–		3	0	–		27	0
Punjab	Total		38	1	5	0	0	0	4	0	0	0	47	1
Mohun Bagan	2025–26	Indian Super League	13	0	1	0	1 (Note: Appearance(s) inAFC Champions League Two)	0	4	0	2 (Note: Appearance(s) in IFA Shield)	0	21	0
Mohun Bagan	2026–27	Indian Super League	5	0	0	0	–		6	0	4 (Note: 3 Appearance(s) in 2026 Calcutta League and 1 Appearance in 2026 IFA Shield)	0	15	0
Mohun Bagan	Mohun Bagan Total		18	0	1	0	1	0	10	1	6	0	36	1
Career total			60	3	6	0	1	0	14	1	6	0	87	4

=== International ===
As of 6 October 2026

National team	Year	Apps	Goals
India	2025	3	0
India	2026	4	0
Total		7	0

== Honours ==
Punjab FC

- I-League: 2022–23

Mohun Bagan

- IFA Shield: 2025, 2026
- Calcutta Football League: 2026
