= Mehtab Singh (footballer) =

Indian footballer

Personal information
- Date of birth: 5 June 1998 (age 28)
- Place of birth: Khemkaran, Punjab, India
- Height: 1.84 m (6 ft 0 in)
- Position: Centre-back

Team information
- Current team: Mohun Bagan SG
- Number: 5

Youth career
- 2009–2016: Mahilpur Football Academy
- 2016–2017: East Bengal

Senior career*
Years	Team	Apps	(Gls)
2016–2020	East Bengal	17	(0)
2019	→ Gokulam Kerala (loan)	5	(0)
2020–2025	Mumbai City	92	(5)
2025–	Mohun Bagan	11	(0)

International career^{‡}
2019–2022	India U23	2	(0)
2023–	India	12	(0)
Medal record
Men's football
Representing India
SAFF Championship
Winner	2023 India
- * Club domestic league appearances and goals as of 12 October 2026 ‡ National team caps and goals as of 16:06, 3 October 2026 (UTC)

Mehtab Singh (Punjabi: ਮਹਿਤਾਬ ਸਿੰਘ; born 5 June 1998) is an Indian professional footballer who plays as a centre-back for Indian Super League club Mohun Bagan SG and the India national team.

== Career ==
=== Early career ===
Mehtab Singh was born in Khemkaran village in Punjab. He travelled around 165 kilometres from Khemkaran to Mahilpur football academy to learn to play football. He later represented the East Bengal U18 side in the 2017–18 U18 I-League.

On 13 December 2017, he scored a goal to help his team to a victory over Mohun Bagan in a crucial under-18 I-League match.

=== East Bengal ===
He was promoted to the senior squad and played in the 2017–18 Calcutta Premier Division for the club. On 28 November 2017, he made I-League debut in a 2–2 draw against Aizawl.

On 14 November 2018, he suffered a head injury due to an collision with Siddharth Singh during the practice when the duo jumped for an aerial ball as their heads clashed against each other. Mehtab was the worst affected as he was seen with a bloody forehead and lay unconscious for sometime before being rushed to the hospital where he had 18 stitches.

=== Gokulam Kerala ===
On 31 January 2019, he was loaned to Gokulam Kerala for the rest of the season. He made a total of 5 appearances for the Kerala side.

=== Mumbai City ===
==== 2020-21 season ====
In 2020, Singh moved to Mumbai City on a 3-year contract ahead of the 2020–21 season. During this season, coach Sergio Lobera used Mehtab as a squad player, only starting five games during the course of the season. However, this season, Mumbai became the first ever team to win both the ISL Shield and the ISL Cup in one season. However, Mehtab was on the bench for the shield deciding match on the final day of the league season, and the ISL Cup final.

==== 2021-22 season ====
Despite Mehtab being left on the bench for the early part of the season under new coach Des Buckingham, he established his place during the second part of the season, starting 10 out of the last 13 games of the season. He scored his first goal against FC Goa on 26 February 2022, heading in a free-kick from Cássio Gabriel.

Later in March 2022, he was included in club's 2022 AFC Champions League squad. During that campaign, Mehtab started in four out of Mumbai's six games. He came off the bench for the closing minutes in Mumbai's win over Air Force Club on 11 April 2022, where Mumbai became the first team from India to win a game in the AFC Champions League. He also played the full 90 minutes in a scoreless draw against UAE's Al Jazira Club, and in Mumbai's 1–0 win over Air Force Club in the reverse fixture as well.

==== 2022-23 season ====
Mehtab was again used as a rotation player in Mumbai's run to the final of the 2022 Durand Cup. However, when the ISL season began, Mehtab retained his place in the team from the previous season, playing the full match in 20 out of the 22 games the club played. Despite coming off the bench as a substitute in the first game of the season against Hyderabad FC, he started the next three games against Odisha FC, Jamshedpur FC, and Kerala Blasters FC, winning the Man Of the Match award in all three games He scored his first goal of the season in the Kerala Blasters match as well. This season, Mumbai won the league shield in record-breaking fashion, with an 18-match unbeaten run.

In the play-offs, Mumbai were knocked out in the play-off semi final against Bengaluru FC. After a 1–0 loss in the first leg, Mehtab scored Mumbai's second goal in the second leg with a header from a corner, equalizing the score 2–2 on aggregate. However, he ended up missing his penalty during sudden death. Defender Sandesh Jhingan subsequently scored his penalty for Bengaluru FC, knocking The Islanders out of the playoffs.

==== 2023-24 season ====
Mehtab was once again part of Mumbai's AFC Champions League squad, starting 3 out of Mumbai's 6 games in the competition. In Mumbai's fourth game, a home match versus Al Hilal, Mehtab put in a strong defensive performance but got a red card in the 54th minute, reducing Mumbai to ten men. The club went on to lose 0–2 in a spirited performance.

Mehtab scored his first goal of the season against NorthEast United FC, in an eventual 1–2 away win for the club. Despite coach Des Buckingham leaving the club mid-season, Mehtab kept his place under new coach Petr Kratky. He remained a regular starter as the club lost the ISL Shield on the final day against Mohun Bagan Super Giant, but took revenge in the ISL Cup final, where this time the club won 3–1 against Mohun Bagan Super Giant.

==== 2024-25 season ====
Mehtab began the 2024–25 season strongly. He scored his first goal of the season in a hard-fought 1–0 win over Hyderabad FC, heading in from a Lallianzuala Chhangte corner.

=== Mohun Bagan Super Giant ===
On 23 August 2025, Mehtab Singh completed a permanent transfer from Mumbai City FC to Mohun Bagan Super Giant, signing 5-year contract ahead of the 2025–26 Indian Super League season.

== International ==
On 13 February 2019, Singh was called up to the India under-23 side which participated in the 2020 AFC U-23 Championship qualifiers. He made his debut for the side in a friendly match against Qatar U23 ahead of the competition.

On 14 March 2023, Singh was called up to the Indian senior squad for the first time. He made his debut in the Hero Tri-Nation International Football Tournament against Myanmar on 22 March, as one of the starters in a 1–0 victory.

== Personal life ==
In December 2022, Mehtab married his long-time girlfriend Shauli Sarkar.

== Career statistics ==
=== Club ===
As of 5 November 2026

Club	Season	League			Super Cup		Durand Cup		AFC		Other(s)		Total	
Club	Season	Division	Apps	Goals	Apps	Goals	Apps	Goals	Apps	Goals	Apps	Goals	Apps	Goals
East Bengal
East Bengal	2016–17	I-League	0	0	–		–		–		–		0	0
East Bengal	2017–18	I-League	6	0	–		–		–		–		6	0
East Bengal	2019–20	I-League	11	0	–		2	0	–		–		13	0
East Bengal	Total	I-League	17	0	0	0	2	0	0	0	0	0	19	0
Gokulam Kerala (loan)	2018–19	I-League	5	0	–		–		–		–		5	0
Gokulam Kerala (loan)	Total		5	0	0	0	0	0	0	0	0	0	5	0
Mumbai City	2020–21	Indian Super League	12	0	–		–		–		–		12	0
Mumbai City	2021–22	Indian Super League	13	1	–		–		6 (Note: Appearance(s) in AFC Champions League)	0	–		19	1
Mumbai City	2022–23	Indian Super League	21	2	3 (Note: Appearance(s) in Super Cup)	1	5 (Note: Appearance(s) in Durand Cup)	1	1 (Note: Appearance in playoff for AFC Champions League)	0	–		30	4
Mumbai City	2023–24	Indian Super League	23	1	1	0	4	1	4	0	–		32	2
Mumbai City	2024–25	Indian Super League	23	1	3	0	–		–		–		26	1
Mumbai City	Total		92	5	7	1	9	2	11	0	0	0	119	8
Mohun Bagan	2025–26	Indian Super League	10	0	3	0	–		–		3 (Note: Appearance(s) in IFA Shield)	0	16	0
Mohun Bagan	2026–27	Indian Super League	4	0	0	0	2	0	–		2 (Note: 1 Appearance in Calcutta Football League and 1Appearance in 2026 IFA Shield)	0	8	0
Mohun Bagan	Total		14	0	3	0	2	0	0	0	5	0	24	0
Career total			128	5	10	1	13	2	11	0	5	0	167	8

=== International ===
As of 3 October 2026

National team	Year	Apps	Goals
India	2023	9	0
India	2024	1	0
India	2025	1	0
India	2026	1	0
Total		12	0

== Honours ==
Mohun Bagan

- IFA Shield: 2025, 2026
- Calcutta Football League: 2026

East Bengal

- Calcutta Football League: 2017–18

Mumbai City

- Indian Super League Shield: 2020–21, 2022–23
- Indian Super League Cup: 2020–21, 2023–24

India

- SAFF Championship: 2023
- Tri-Nation Series: 2023
- Intercontinental Cup: 2023
