= Abhishek Suryavanshi =

Indian footballer (born 2001)

Personal information
- Full name: Abhishek Dhananjay Suryavanshi
- Date of birth: 12 March 2001 (age 25)
- Place of birth: Budh, Satara, Maharashtra, India
- Position: Midfielder

Team information
- Current team: Mohun Bagan
- Number: 16

Youth career
- 2017–2018: DSK Shivajians
- 2018–2020: ATK B

Senior career*
| Years | Team | Apps | (Gls) |
| 2020– | Mohun Bagan | 29 | (0) |

International career^{‡}
| 2023–2024 | India U23 | 2 | (0) |
- * Club domestic league appearances and goals as of 16:47, 1 March 2026 (UTC) ‡ National team caps and goals as of 11:33, 25 March 2024 (UTC)

Abhishek Dhananjay Suryavanshi (born 12 March 2001) is an Indian professional footballer who plays as a midfielder for Indian Super League club Mohun Bagan.

== Career statistics ==
=== Club ===
As of 1 September 2026

| Club | Season | League | | | Durand Cup | | Super Cup | | AFC | | Other | | Total | |
| Club | Season | Division | Apps | Goals | Apps | Goals | Apps | Goals | Apps | Goals | Apps | Goals | Apps | Goals |
|---|---|---|---|---|---|---|---|---|---|---|---|---|---|---|
| ATK B | 2020 | I-League 2nd Division | 0 | 0 | — | | — | | — | | — | | 0 | 0 |
| ATK B | ATK Total | | 0 | 0 | 0 | 0 | 0 | 0 | 0 | 0 | 0 | 0 | 0 | 0 |
| Mohun Bagan | 2021–22 | Indian Super League | 2 | 0 | — | | – | | 2 (Note: Appearance(s) in 2021 AFC Cup) | 0 | — | | 4 | 0 |
| Mohun Bagan | 2022–23 | Indian Super League | 0 | 0 | 1 | 0 | — | | 2 (Note: Appearance(s) in 2022 AFC Cup) | 0 | — | | 3 | 0 |
| Mohun Bagan | 2023–24 | Indian Super League | 14 | 0 | 2 | 0 | 2 | 0 | 1 (Note: Appearance(s) in 2023 AFC Cup) | 0 | 8 (Note: Appearances in Calcutta Football League) | 0 | 27 | 0 |
| Mohun Bagan | 2024–25 | Indian Super League | 11 | 0 | 5 | 0 | 2 | 0 | 1 (Note: Appearance(s) in 2024 ACL Two) | 0 | 4 | 0 | 23 | 0 |
| Mohun Bagan | 2025–26 | Indian Super League | 2 | 0 | 3 | 0 | 1 | 0 | - | | 2 (Note: Appearance(s) in 2025 IFA Shield) | 0 | 8 | 0 |
| Mohun Bagan | 2026–27 | Indian Super League | 0 | 0 | 2 | 0 | 0 | 0 | - | | 5 | 1 | 7 | 1 |
| Mohun Bagan | Mohun Bagan Total | | 29 | 0 | 13 | 0 | 5 | 0 | 6 | 0 | 19 | 1 | 72 | 1 |
| Career Total | | | 29 | 0 | 13 | 0 | 5 | 0 | 6 | 0 | 19 | 1 | 72 | 1 |

== Honours ==
Mohun Bagan

- Indian Super League Cup: 2022–23, 2023–24
- Durand Cup: 2023

India

- SAFF Championship: 2026

Individual

- Indian Super League Emerging Player of the Month: April 2024
