= Leewan Castanha =

Indian footballer (born 2003)

Personal information
- Date of birth: 15 April 2003 (age 23)
- Place of birth: Curtorim, Goa, India
- Height: 1.78 m (5 ft 10 in)
- Positions: Centre-back; right back

Team information
- Current team: Inter Kashi
- Number: 19

Youth career
- 2014–2021: Goa Academy

Senior career*
Years	Team	Apps	(Gls)
2021–2024	Goa B	9	(1)
2021–2022	→ Indian Arrows (loan)	18	(0)
2024–2026	Mohun Bagan SG B	12	(0)
2026	Jamshepdur	0	(0)
2026–	Inter Kashi	0	(0)

International career^{‡}
2022	India U20	0	(0)
- * Club domestic league appearances and goals as of 23:15, 8 March 2026 (IST) ‡ National team caps and goals as of 16:54, 18 October 2022 (IST)

Leewan Castanha (born 15 April 2003) is an Indian professional footballer who plays as a defender for Indian Super League club Inter Kashi.

== Career ==
Leewan Castanha made up his first professional appearance for Indian Arrows on 10 January 2021 against Churchill Brothers.

== Career statistics ==
=== Club ===
As of 18 April 2022

Club	Season	League			Cup		AFC		Total	
Club	Season	Division	Apps	Goals	Apps	Goals	Apps	Goals	Apps	Goals
Indian Arrows (loan)	2020–21	I-League	10	0	0	0	—		10	0
Indian Arrows (loan)	2021–22	I-League	8	0	2 (Note: Appearance(s) in IFA Shield)	0	—		10	0
Goa II	2022-23	I-League 2	1	0	—		—		1	0
Goa II	2022-23	RFDL	4	1	—		—		4	1
Goa II	2023-24	RFDL	4	0	—		—		4	0
Career total			27	1	2	0	0	0	29	1
