= Clarence Fernandes =

Indian footballer (born 2004)

Personal information
- Full name: Clarence Savio Fernandes
- Date of birth: 25 July 2004 (age 22)
- Place of birth: Goa, India
- Positions: Midfielder; defender

Team information
- Current team: Hyderabad

Youth career
- 2019–2020: Churchill Brothers Youth
- 2020–2023: Dempo Youth
- 2023–2024: Bengaluru Youth

Senior career*
Years	Team	Apps	(Gls)
2023–2024	Bengaluru B	1	(0)
2024–	Hyderabad	0	(0)
2025	→ Sporting Bengaluru (loan)	11	(3)

International career^{‡}
2025–	India U23		
- * Club domestic league appearances and goals as of 14:00, 26 May 2025 (UTC) ‡ National team caps and goals as of 14:00, 26 May 2025 (UTC)

Clarence Savio Fernandes (born 25 July 2004) is an Indian professional footballer who plays as a defensive midfielder for the Indian Super League (ISL) club Hyderabad.

== Club career ==
Fernandes started his youth career with Churchill Brothers' under 16 team in 2019. In 2020, he transferred to Dempo, played almost three year with their age group teams. In 2023, he joined Bengaluru. From 2023 to 2024, he represented the youth team of Bengaluru in the Development League. He won the 2023 Development League with Bengaluru.

For 2022–23 season he played one match for Bengaluru B in the 2022–23 I-League 2nd Division.This was the first match of his senior career. He played another match during 2024 Durand Cup for the main team of Bengaluru. In 2024, he left Bengaluru and joined Hyderabad, but during 2024–25 season, he was transferred on loan to Sporting Bengaluru. He played eleven matches for the club in the 2024–25 I-League until his loan expired. He rejoined Hyderabad and yet to make a debut in the ISL.

== International career ==
Fernandes was part of the India under-15 squad during 2017 exposure tour in UAE and Saudi Arabia but never played any matches. In May 2025, India under-23 head coach Naushad Moosa listed Fernandes in the 29-members probable squad for two friendlies that will be held in Tajikistan in June 2025.

== Career statistics ==
=== Club ===
As of 26 May 2025

Appearances and goals by club, season and competition
Club	Season	League			Super Cup		Durand Cup		Continental		Total	
Club	Season	Division	Apps	Goals	Apps	Goals	Apps	Goals	Apps	Goals	Apps	Goal
Bengaluru B	2022–23	I-League 2	1	0	–		–		–		1	0
Bengaluru B	Total		1	0	–		–		–		1	0
Bengaluru B	2024–25	Indian Super League	0	0	0	0	1	0	0	0	1	0
Bengaluru B	Total		–		–		1	0	–		1	0
Sporting Bengaluru (loan)	2024–25	I League	11	3	0	0	0	0	0	0	11	3
Sporting Bengaluru (loan)	Total		11	3	0	0	0	0	0	0	11	3
Career total			12	3	0	0	1	0	0	0	13	3

== Honours ==
Bengaluru FC B

- Development League: 2023
