= 2026–27 I-League 3 =

4th season of the I-League 3

I-League 3
- Season: 2026–27
- Dates: 22 October 2026 – 14 December 2026
- Teams: 19
- Matches: 36
- Goals: 116 (3.22 per match)
- Highest scoring: Lakecity 3–5 Godavari (22 October 2026)
- Longest losing run: Kuppuraj (4 matches)
- Highest attendance: 1,981
- Total attendance: 12,908
- Average attendance: 359

The 2026–27 I-League 3 is the 4th season of the I-League 3 since its establishment in 2023 as the fourth tier of the Indian football league system. The season commenced on 22 October 2026, featuring 19 clubs divided across four groups for the group stage.

== Format ==
The tournament begins with a single round-robin group stage hosted across four centralized venues.

- Group Stage: 19 clubs were split into four groups. Matches are played from 22 October to 9 November 2026.
- Play-offs: The four group winners and the two best second placed teams advance to the six team play-offs.
- Promotion: The top two teams from the play-offs earn promotion to the 2027-28 I-League 2.

== Club changes ==
- The number of participating clubs has been reduced to 19, down from 20 in the previous season.

#	Club	Path
Entered I-League 3
1	NEROCA	Relegation from I-League 2 ▼
2–16	15 clubs	Nomination from State Leagues ▲
Exited I-League 3
1	Banaras Baghpat	Promotion to I-League 2 ▲
2	Raengdai	Promotion to I-League 2 ▲
3–16	14 clubs	Returned to State Leagues ▼

== Clubs ==
Locations of 2025–26 I-League 3 group stage clubs
Group A
Group B
Group C
Group D

No.	Club	City	State	League	Position
1	NEROCA	Imphal	Manipur	2025–26 I-League 2	9th
2	KLASA	Bishnupur	Manipur	2025–26 I-League 3	4th
3	TRAU	Imphal	Manipur	2025–26 I-League 3	5th
4	Chhaygaon	Chhaygaon	Assam	2025–26 I-League 3	6th
5	Garhwal Heroes	New Delhi	Delhi	2025–26 Delhi Premier League	1st
6	Lakecity	Bhopal	Madhya Pradesh	2025–26 Madhya Pradesh Premier League	1st
7	Kuppuraj	Pondicherry	Pondicherry	2025 Pondicherry Men's League	1st
8	Nongkseh SS&CC	Shillong	Meghalaya	2025 Meghalaya State League	1st
9	Zinc FA	Udaipur	Rajasthan	2025–26 R-League A Division	1st
10	Techtro Swades United	Una	Himachal Pradesh	2026 Himachal Football League	1st
11	Corbett FC	Rudrapur	Uttarakhand	2026 Uttarakhand Super League	1st
12	Kickstart	Bengaluru	Karnataka	2025–26 BDFA Super Division	1st
13	Ghaziabad City FC	Ghaziabad	Uttar Pradesh	2026 Uttar Pradesh Football Sangh League	2nd
14	Sher-e-Punjab	Mohali	Punjab	2025–26 Punjab State Super League	1st
15	Southern Sporting Union	Imphal	Manipur	2025-26 Manipur Premier League	1st
16	Godavari FC	Rajahmundry	Andhra Pradesh	2026 AP Super Cup	1st
17	Salgaocar	Vasco	Goa	2025–26 Goa Professional League	3rd
18	RT Boys FC	Hyderabad	Telangana	2025–26 Telangana A Division Rahim League	1st
19	Game of Goals FCC	Pune	Maharashtra	2026 Maharashtra State Senior Men's Football League	1st

== Venues ==
Stage	Group	City	Stadium	Capacity
Group stage	A	Imphal	SAI Natural Ground	NA
Group stage	B	Rudrapur	Amenity Football Academy	NA
Group stage	C	Shillong	SSA Football Stadium	5,000
Group stage	D	Mapusa	Duler Stadium	10,000
Final round		Shillong	SSA Football Stadium	5,000

== Group stage ==
=== Group A ===
Pos	Team	Pld	W	D	L	GF	GA	GD	Pts	Qualification	NER	TRA	SSU	KLA
1	NEROCA	3	2	1	0	4	2	+2	7	Advance to Play-offs			1–0	3–2
2	TRAU	3	1	2	0	6	4	+2	5		0–0			3–1
3	Southern Sporting Union	3	0	2	1	4	5	−1	2			3–3		
4	KLASA	3	0	1	2	4	7	−3	1				1–1	

Source: IFL
Rules for classification: 1) points; 2) head-to-head points; 3) goal difference; 4) goals scored; 5) goal difference vs. qualified club 6) toss of coin

=== Group B ===
Pos	Team	Pld	W	D	L	GF	GA	GD	Pts	Qualification	GAR	COR	TEC	SEP	GHZ
1	Garhwal Heroes	4	2	2	0	3	1	+2	8	Advance to Play-offs		0–0		1–1	
2	Corbett	4	2	1	1	5	5	0	7				0–3		3–1
3	Techtro Swades (H)	4	1	2	1	5	3	+2	5		0–1				0–0
4	Sher-e-Punjab SC	4	0	3	1	4	5	−1	3			1–2	2–2		
5	Ghaziabad City	4	0	2	2	1	4	−3	2		0–1			0–0	

Source: IFL
Rules for classification: 1) points; 2) head-to-head points; 3) goal difference; 4) goals scored; 5) goal difference vs. qualified club 6) toss of coin
(H) Hosts

=== Group C ===
Pos	Team	Pld	W	D	L	GF	GA	GD	Pts	Qualification	NON	GOD	LKC	CHA	KUP
1	Nongkseh SS&CC (H)	4	3	0	1	11	3	+8	9	Advance to Play-offs			0–1		4–1
2	Godavari FC	4	3	0	1	14	8	+6	9	Advance to Play-offs	1–3				5–1
3	Lakecity	4	3	0	1	9	7	+2	9			3–5		2–1	
4	Chhaygaon	4	1	0	3	9	9	0	3		0–4	1–3			
5	Kuppuraj	4	0	0	4	3	19	−16	0				1–3	0–7	

Source: IFL
Rules for classification: 1) points; 2) head-to-head points; 3) goal difference; 4) goals scored; 5) goal difference vs. qualified club 6) toss of coin
(H) Hosts

=== Group D ===
Pos	Team	Pld	W	D	L	GF	GA	GD	Pts	Qualification	SAL	KST	GOG	ZIN	RTB
1	CD Salgaocar (H)	4	3	0	1	9	4	+5	9 (Note: Head-to-head points: CD Salgaocar 3, Kickstart 0.)	Advance to Play-offs				1–0	5–1
2	Kickstart	4	3	0	1	11	5	+6	9	Advance to Play-offs	1–2		3–1		
3	GOG FCC	4	2	1	1	7	6	+1	7		2–1			2–0	
4	Zinc FA	4	1	0	3	3	5	−2	3			1–2			2–0
5	RT Boys FC	4	0	1	3	4	14	−10	1			1–5	2–2		

Source: IFL
Rules for classification: 1) points; 2) head-to-head points; 3) goal difference; 4) goals scored; 5) goal difference vs. qualified club 6) toss of coin
(H) Hosts

=== Ranking of 2nd placed teams ===
Due to the uneven number of teams across the groups, matches played against the last-placed team in five-teams groups are not taken into account.

Pos	Grp	Team	Pld	W	D	L	GF	GA	GD	Pts	Qualification
1	C	Godavari FC	3	2	0	1	9	7	+2	6	Advance to Play-offs
2	D	Kickstart	3	2	0	1	6	4	+2	6	Advance to Play-offs
3	A	TRAU	3	1	2	0	6	4	+2	5	
4	B	Corbett FC	3	1	1	1	2	4	−2	4	

Source: IFL
Rules for classification: 1) points; 2) head-to-head points; 3) goal difference; 4) goals scored; 5) goal difference vs. qualified club 6) toss of coin

== Play-offs ==
Pos	Team	Pld	W	D	L	GF	GA	GD	Pts	Promotion	SAL	GRH	GOD	KST	NER	NON
1	CD Salgaocar	0	0	0	0	0	0	0	0	Promotion to I-League 2						
2	Garhwal Heroes	0	0	0	0	0	0	0	0	Promotion to I-League 2						
3	Godavari FC	0	0	0	0	0	0	0	0							
4	Kickstart	0	0	0	0	0	0	0	0							
5	NEROCA	0	0	0	0	0	0	0	0							
6	Nongkseh SS&CC	0	0	0	0	0	0	0	0							

Source: IFL
Legend: Blue = home team win; Yellow = draw; Red = away team win.
Rules for classification: 1) points; 2) head-to-head points; 3) head-to-head goal difference; 4) goal difference; 5) number of goals scored; 6) drawing of lots

== Attendances ==
=== Group stage ===
Match No.	Group A		Match no.	Group B	
Match No.	Fixture	Attendance	Match no.	Fixture	Attendance
1	TRAU–KLASA	300	1	Corbett–Techtro Swades	500
2	NEROCA–Southern Sporting Union	400	2	Ghaziabad City–Sher-e-Punjab	150
3	KLASA–Southern Sporting Union	200	3	Techtro Swades–Ghaziabad City	250
4	TRAU–NEROCA	250	4	Garhwal Heroes–Corbett	150
5	NEROCA–KLASA	200	5	Ghaziabad City–Garhwal Heroes	150
6	Southern Sporting Union–TRAU	200	6	Sher-e-Punjab–Techtro Swades	150
			7	Garhwal Heroes–Sher-e-Punjab	150
			8	Corbett–Ghaziabad City	150
			9	Sher-e-Punjab–Corbett	300
			10	Techtro Swades–Garhwal Heroes	200
Group A Total		1,550	Group B Total		2,150
Match No.	Group C		Match No.	Group D	
Match No.	Fixture	Attendance	Match No.	Fixture	Attendance
1	Lakecity FC–Godavari FC	0	1	CD Salgaocar–Zinc FA	250
2	Nongkseh SS&CC–Kuppuraj FC	1,981	2	RT Boys FC–GOG FCC	230
3	Kuppuraj FC–Lakecity FC	105	3	Zinc FA–RT Boys FC	159
4	Chhaygaon FC–Nongkseh SS&CC	1,521	4	Kickstart–CD Salgaocar	580
5	Lakecity FC–Chhaygaon FC	0	5	RT Boys FC–Kickstart	150
6	Godavari FC–Kuppuraj FC	0	6	GOG FCC–Zinc FA	250
7	Chhaygaon FC–Godavari FC	0	7	Kickstart–GOG FCC	150
8	Nongkseh SS&CC–Lakecity FC	1,345	8	CD Salgaocar–RT Boys FC	450
9	Kuppuraj FC–Chhaygaon FC	0	9	Zinc FA–Kickstart	125
10	Godavari FC–Nongkseh SS&CC	1,532	10	GOG FCC–CD Salgaocar	380
Group C Total		6,484	Group D Total		2,724

== See also ==
- Men
  - 2026–27 ISL
  - 2026–27 Indian Football League
  - 2026–27 I-League 2
  - 2026–27 Indian State Leagues
  - 2026 Durand Cup
  - 2027 Federation Cup
- Women
  - 2026–27 IWL
  - 2026–27 IWL 2
