= 2026–27 in Indian football =

Competitive association football season

Football in India
- Season: 2026–27

Men's football
- ISL: TBD
- IFL: TBD
- I-League 2: TBD
- I-League 3: TBD
- Federation Cup: TBD
- Durand Cup: East Bengal

Women's football
- IWL: TBD
- IWL 2: TBD

The 2026–27 season will be the 139th competitive association football season in India. The domestic season began in July 2026.

Legend

Win Draw Loss Possible qualification Void or postponed Fixtures

The following is a list of match results in the 2026–27 season, as well as any future matches that have been scheduled in the season.

== Men's national football team ==
=== Senior team ===
==== 2026 ====
FIFA Asean Cup

25 September 2026 FIFA ASEAN Cup	Malaysia	Withdrew	India	Jakarta, Indonesia
15:00 UTC+7		Report		Stadium: Gelora Bung Karno Stadium

28 September 2026 FIFA ASEAN Cup	India	Withdrew	Singapore	Jakarta, Indonesia
15:00 UTC+7		Report		Stadium: Gelora Bung Karno Stadium

1 October 2026 FIFA ASEAN Cup	Indonesia	Withdrew	India	Jakarta, Indonesia
18:30 UTC+7		Report		Stadium: Gelora Bung Karno Stadium

Friendly matches

25 September Friendly	India	1–1	Panama	Bengaluru, India
19:00 UTC+5:30	Williams 41'	Report	O. Valencia 68'	Stadium: Sree Kanteerava Stadium; Attendance: 9,039; Referee: Nazmi Nasaruddin (Malaysia)

3 October Friendly	India	0–4	Brazil	Kolkata, India
19:30 UTC+5:30		AIFF; FIFA	Estêvão 28'; Pedro 42'; Lino 58', 90+5'	Stadium: Salt Lake Stadium; Attendance: 51,402; Referee: Ilgiz Tantashev (Uzbekistan)

6 October Friendly	India	1–6	Uruguay	Kolkata, India
19:30 UTC+5:30	Thapa 22'	AIFF; FIFA	Núñez 12' (pen.); Araújo 28', 59'; Zalazar 53'; Sanabria 71'; Aguirre 86'	Stadium: Salt Lake Stadium; Attendance: 37,307; Referee: Rustam Lutfullin (Uzbekistan)

12 November Friendly	New Zealand	5–0	India	Auckland, New Zealand
19:00 +13:00	Varghese 5' (o.g.); Randall 34', 43'; Wood 57'; Bayliss 75'	AIFF; NZF		Stadium: Go Media Stadium; Attendance: 10,379; Referee: Adam Kersey (Australia)

15 November Friendly	New Zealand	3–0	India	Christchurch, New Zealand
16:30 +13:00	Surman 22'; McGarry 40'; Wood 44'	AIFF; NZF		Stadium: One New Zealand Stadium; Referee: Tim Danaskos (Australia)

SAFF Championship

Pos	Team	Pld	W	D	L	GF	GA	GD	Pts	Qualification
1	India	2	2	0	0	4	2	+2	6	Advanced to the Knockout stage
2	Pakistan	2	1	0	1	5	3	+2	3	Advanced to the Knockout stage
3	Maldives	2	0	0	2	0	4	−4	0	

Source: SAFF

5 November 2026 SAFF Championship Group B	India	3–2	Pakistan	Dhaka, Bangladesh
15:00 IST	Suhail 13', 19'; Kipgen 32'	SAFF; FIFA	Najeeb 90+1'; Ghazi 90+4'	Stadium: National Stadium; Attendance: 2,300; Referee: Ngô Duy Lân (Vietnam)

11 November 2026 SAFF Championship Group B	Maldives	0–1	India	Dhaka, Bangladesh
15:00 IST		SAFF; FIFA	Suhail 38' (pen.)	Stadium: National Stadium; Referee: Mohammed Khalfan Al Manai (Oman)

14 November 2026 SAFF Championship Semi-finals	India	2–1	Bhutan	Dhaka, Bangladesh
15:00 IST	Vishnu 8'; Konsham 27'	Report	Tobden 48'	Stadium: National Stadium; Referee: Thoriq Alkatiri (Indonesia)

17 November 2026 SAFF Championship Final	India	2–1	Pakistan	Dhaka, Bangladesh
20:00 IST	Bhat 61'; Mandi 88'	Report	Ghazi 45+1'	Stadium: National Stadium; Attendance: 9,348; Referee: Mohammed Khalfan Al Manai (Oman)

=== Under-20 ===
==== 2026 ====
Friendly matches

3 August 2026 Friendly	India	3–0	Singapore	Bengaluru, India
	Ningthoukhongjam 45+2'; Shami 63'; ?? , 83' (o.g.)	Report		Stadium: Centre For Sports Excellence

6 August 2026 Friendly	India	1–0	Singapore	Bengaluru, India
	Brahmacharimayum 5'	Report		Stadium: Centre For Sports Excellence

20 August 2026 Friendly	India	0–0	Yemen	Bengaluru, India
		Report		Stadium: Centre For Sports Excellence

23 August 2026 Friendly	India	1–0	Yemen	Bengaluru, India
	Gunleiba Wangkheirakpam 89'	Report		Stadium: Centre For Sports Excellence

Asian Cup qualifiers

Pos	Team	Pld	W	D	L	GF	GA	GD	Pts	Qualification or relegation
1	Uzbekistan (H)	3	3	0	0	9	0	+9	9	Qualified for the final tournament
2	India	3	2	0	1	4	4	0	6	Qualified for the final tournament
3	Syria	3	1	0	2	3	4	−1	3	
4	Bangladesh	3	0	0	3	0	8	−8	0	Relegation to development phase

Source: AFC
Rules for classification: Qualification tiebreakers
(H) Hosts

31 August 2026 2027 AFC U20 Qualifiers	Syria	0–1	India	Tashkent, Uzbekistan
16:30 IST		Report	Singamayum 86'	Stadium: Do'stlik Stadium; Referee: Du Jianxin (China)

3 September 2026 2027 AFC U20 Qualifiers	India	0–4	Uzbekistan	Tashkent, Uzbekistan
19:30 IST		Report	Maratov 29'; Kuvonchbek 34'; Shorakhmedov 67'; Sersenbaev 90'	Stadium: Do'stlik Stadium; Referee: Morteza Mansourian (Iran)

6 September 2026 2027 AFC U20 Qualifiers	India	3–0	Bangladesh	Tashkent, Uzbekistan
16:30 IST	Laishram 25'; Yadav 60'; Arbash 79'	Report		Stadium: Do'stlik Stadium; Referee: Yudi Nurcahya (Indonesia)

=== Under-17 ===
==== 2026 ====
Friendly matches

4 October 2026 Friendly	Myanmar	1–1	India	Thanlyin, Myanmar
15:30 MST	Aung Myat Thar 42'	Report	Dallalmoun Gangte 73' (pen.)	Stadium: StarCity Sports Club Ground

7 October 2026 Friendly	Myanmar	0–4	India	Thanlyin, Myanmar
15:30 MST		Report	Sharry Singh 40'; Kyi Thar 53' (o.g.); Kamgouhao Doungel 60'; Hrishikesh Charan Manavathi 72'	Stadium: StarCity Sports Club Ground

1 November 2026 Friendly	United Arab Emirates	0–0	India	Ras Al Khaimah, United Arab Emirates
20:30 IST		Report		Stadium: Emirates Football Club Stadium

4 November 2026 Friendly	United Arab Emirates	1–4	India	Ras Al Khaimah, United Arab Emirates
20:30 IST	Jayden Adetiba 71'	Report	Dallalmuon Gangte 12' 61'; Sharry Singh 83'; Abhishek Kumar Mondal 50'	Stadium: Saud bin Saqr Al Qasimi Stadium

AFC U17 Qualifiers

Pos	Team	Pld	W	D	L	GF	GA	GD	Pts	Qualification
1	India	4	3	1	0	20	3	+17	10	Final tournament
2	Palestine	4	3	0	1	11	6	+5	9	
3	Malaysia (H)	4	2	1	1	12	3	+9	7	
4	Singapore	4	1	0	3	11	9	+2	3	
5	Guam	4	0	0	4	0	33	−33	0	

Source: AFC
(H) Hosts

11 November 2026 2027 AFC U17 ACQ	Singapore	2–4	India	Kuala Lumpur, Malaysia
18:30 IST	Izzan 26', 64'	Report	Gangte 29', 61' (pen.), 82'; Maity 88'	Stadium: Kuala Lumpur Stadium; Referee: Dan Ning (China)

14 November 2026 2027 AFC U17 ACQ	India	12–0	Guam	Kuala Lumpur, Malaysia
15:30 UTC+8	Thongbam 5'; Gangte 13', 27', 32'; Manavathi 20'; Irom 53'; Wahengbam 55', 73', 84', 85'; Saikhom 56'; Maity 87'	Report		Stadium: Kuala Lumpur Stadium; Referee: Lin Te-en (Chinese Taipei)

17 November 2026 2027 AFC U17 ACQ	Palestine	1–4	India	Kuala Lumpur, Malaysia
15:30 UTC+8	Khalifah 33' (pen.)	Report	Doungel 7'; Ningthoujam 51'; Gangte 58'; Lalhunmawia 88'	Stadium: Kuala Lumpur Stadium; Referee: Ko Min-gook (South Korea)

20 November 2026 2027 AFC U17 ACQ	India	0–0	Malaysia	Kuala Lumpur, Malaysia
21:00 UTC+8		Report		Stadium: Kuala Lumpur Stadium; Referee: Mario Cheung Wai Lung (Hong Kong)

=== Under-15 ===
==== 2026 ====
Friendly matches

13 October 2026 Friendly	Qatar	4–1	India	Doha, Qatar
		Report

11–17 October 2026 Friendly	Aspire Academy U-15 (Qatar)	2–2	India	Doha, Qatar
		Report		Stadium: Aspire Academy

11–17 October 2026 Friendly	Aspire Academy U-15 (Qatar)	2–2	India	Doha, Qatar
		Report		Stadium: Aspire Academy

2026 FIFA U-15 World Cup

Group K

24 October 2026 2026 FIFA U15 WC&F QS	Laos	2–4	India	Hovsan, Azerbaijan
11:45 IST	Anavin Xayyasone 12'; Souksavanh Siliseng 24'; Khansy Sengsouly (yellow card) 38'	Report	Macdonnish Ngairangbam 7'; R Lalremruatfela 11', 31'; Birjit Amom (yellow card) 25'; Soumojit Sarkar 33'	Stadium: Hovsan Competition Complex (Pitch 1B)

25 October 2026 2026 FIFA U15 WC&F QS	India	2–1	Cameroon	Hovsan, Azerbaijan
10:30 IST	Fareil Ngobo 1' (o.g.); R Lalremruatfela 27'	Report	Muhammad Sohil Khan 20' (o.g.)	Stadium: Hovsan Competition Complex (Pitch 1B)

25 October 2026 2026 FIFA U15 WC&F QS	Grenada	3–3	India	Hovsan, Azerbaijan
17:15 IST		Report		Stadium: Hovsan Competition Complex (Pitch 1B)

26 October 2026 2026 FIFA U15 WC&F QS	Bahrain	3–4	India	Hovsan, Azerbaijan
14:15 IST		Report		Stadium: Hovsan Competition Complex (Pitch 9A)

26 October 2026 2026 FIFA U15 WC&F QS	India	1–6	Senegal	Hovsan, Azerbaijan
21:00 IST		Report		Stadium: Hovsan Competition Complex (Pitch 8A)

Tier C playoffs

28 October 2026 2026 FIFA U15 WC&F TS	India	1–2	Honduras	Hovsan, Azerbaijan
13:00 IST		Report		Stadium: Hovsan Competition Complex (Pitch 8A)

28 October 2026 2026 FIFA U15 WC&F TS	India	3–2	Trinidad and Tobago	Hovsan, Azerbaijan
13:00 IST		Report		Stadium: Hovsan Competition Complex (Pitch 8A)

29 October 2026 2026 FIFA U15 WC&F TS	India	1–2	Afghanistan	Hovsan, Azerbaijan
13:00 IST		Report		Stadium: Hovsan Competition Complex (Pitch 1A)

29 October 2026 2026 FIFA U15 WC&F TS	India	5–5 (4–5 p)	Kazakhstan	Hovsan, Azerbaijan
19:45 IST		Report		Stadium: Hovsan Competition Complex (Pitch 6A)

30 October 2026 2026 FIFA U15 WC&F TS	India	6–4	Cuba	Hovsan, Azerbaijan
14:15 IST		Report		Stadium: Hovsan Competition Complex (Pitch 1A)

== Women's national football team ==
=== Senior team ===
==== 2026 ====
Friendly matches

8 October Friendly	India	0–4	Russia	Kolkata, India
18:00 (IST)		AIFF RFU	Sheina 41'; Petukhova 60', 65'; Svistunova 81'	Stadium: Kishore Bharati Krirangan; Referee: Virendra Rai (India)

11 October Friendly	India	0–8	Russia	Kolkata, India
18:00 (IST)		AIFF; RFU	Ishmukhametova 21', 43' (pen.); Achoian 25', 45+1'; Kishmakhova 29'; Mashina 50', 51'; Semenova 74'	Stadium: Kishore Bharati Krirangan; Referee: Virendha Rai (Bhutan)

=== Under-17 ===
==== 2026 ====
Friendly matches

27 August 2026 Friendly	Uzbekistan	0–0	India	Tashkent, Uzbekistan
17:00 IST		Report		Stadium: UFA National Football Centre

30 August 2026 Friendly	Uzbekistan	0–0	India	Tashkent, Uzbekistan
17:00 IST		Report		Stadium: UFA National Football Centre

26 September 2026 Friendly	India	2–4	Philippines	Goa, India
16:00 IST	A. Kumari 85'; Joya 89'	Report	47', 50', 68', 79'	Stadium: Vagator Football Ground

29 September 2026 Friendly	India	2–0	Philippines	Goa, India
16:00 IST	A. Kumari 26' (pen.), 50'	Report		Stadium: Vagator Football Ground

AFC U17 Qualifiers

Pos	Team	Pld	W	D	L	GF	GA	GD	Pts	Qualification
1	India	3	3	0	0	20	0	+20	9	Final tournament
2	Malaysia (H)	3	2	0	1	5	4	+1	6	
3	Syria	3	1	0	2	1	3	−2	3	
4	Iraq	3	0	0	3	0	19	−19	0	

Source: AFC
Rules for classification: Qualification tiebreakers
(H) Hosts

5 October 2026 2027 AFC U17 WACQ	India	14–0	Iraq	Selayang, Malaysia
16:00 UTC+8	A. Kumari 9', 12', 39', 47', 71'; Baskey 14'; Sorokhaibam 21', 30'; Longjam 42'; Barman 49'; Basnett 70', 86'; Hasan 78'; Senjam 90+3'	Report		Stadium: MP Selayang Stadium; Referee: Lê Thị Ly (Vietnam)

8 October 2026 2027 AFC U17 WACQ	India	0–2	Syria	Kuala Lumpur, Malaysia
16:00 UTC+8	A. Kumari 5', 55'	Report		Stadium: Kuala Lumpur Stadium; Referee: Supiree Testhomya (Thailand)

11 October 2026 2027 AFC U17 WACQ	India	4–0	Malaysia	MP Selayang Stadium, Selayang
20:00 UTC+8	Chingkhamayum 28'; Barman 50'; A. Kumari 56'; Kumar 86'	Report		Referee: Hanine Merhi (Lebanon)

== AFC club competitions (men's) ==
=== AFC Champions League 2 ===
==== Qualifying play-offs ====
12 August 2026 Preliminary round	East Bengal (India)	4–1 (a.e.t.)	(Kuwait) Al-Arabi	Kolkata
19:00 UTC+5:30	Gupta 90'; Rashid 108'; Lalhlansanga 117'; Danu 120'	AFC Report; GSA Report	Iwuala 76' (pen.)	Stadium: Salt Lake Stadium; Attendance: 17,567; Referee: Sadullo Gulmurodi (Tajikistan)

12 August 2026 Preliminary round	Arkadag (Turkmenistan)	3–0	(India) Goa	Arkadag
20:00 UTC+5	Diniýew 61'; Myratberdiýew 65'; Sapargulýyew 75'	AFC Report; GSA Report		Stadium: Arkadag Stadium; Attendance: 10,000; Referee: Abdullah Jamali (Kuwait)

==== Group stage ====
Pos	Team	Pld	W	D	L	GF	GA	GD	Pts	Qualification	SHO	HUS	SEE	EBG
1	(Iraq) Al-Shorta (A)	4	3	1	0	8	3	+5	10	Advance to round of 16	—	1–1	1–0	–
2	(Jordan) Al-Hussein	4	1	2	1	6	6	0	5	Advance to round of 16	0–3	—	–	2–2
3	(Oman) Al-Seeb	4	1	1	2	2	4	−2	4		–	0–3	—	0–0
4	(India) East Bengal	4	0	2	2	4	7	−3	2		2–3	–	0–2	—

Updated to match(es) played on 3 November 2026. Source: ACL2
Rules for classification: Tiebreakers
(A) Advance to a further round

16 September 2026 Group stage	Al-Hussein (Jordan)	2–2	(India) East Bengal	Amman, Jordan
21:30 IST	Al-Mardi 61'; Assaf 87'	AFC Report; GSA Report	Ramírez 9'; Ali 40'	Stadium: Amman International Stadium; Referee: Ahmad Alaeddin (Lebanon)

13 October 2026 Group stage	East Bengal (India)	2–3	(Iraq) Al-Shorta	Kolkata, India
19:15 IST	Lalhlansanga 8', 40'	AFC Report; GSA Report	Yahya 14'; Al-Saedi 51'; Kuku 53'	Stadium: Salt Lake Stadium; Attendance: 12,765; Referee: Majed Al-Shamrani (Saudi Arabia)

27 October 2026 Group stage	Al-Seeb (Oman)	0–0	(India) East Bengal	Seeb, Oman
21:30 IST		AFC Report; GSA Report		Stadium: Al Seeb Stadium; Attendance: 1,120; Referee: Alex King (Australia)

3 November 2026 Group stage	East Bengal (India)	0–2	(Oman) Al-Seeb	Kolkata, India
19:15 IST		AFC Report; GSA Report	Méyé 85'; Al-Aghbari 90+1'	Stadium: Salt Lake Stadium; Attendance: 11,735; Referee: Thoriq Alkatiri (Indonesia)

24 November 2026 Group stage	East Bengal (India)	–	(Jordan) Al-Hussein	Kolkata, India
19:15 IST		[ AFC Report] GSA Report		Stadium: Salt Lake Stadium

8 December 2026 Group stage	Al-Shorta (Iraq)	–	(India) East Bengal	Baghdad, Iraq
21:30 IST		[ AFC Report] GSA Report		Stadium: Al-Zawraa Stadium

=== AFC Challenge League ===
==== Group stage ====
Pos	Team	Pld	W	D	L	GF	GA	GD	Pts	Qualification	QAD	FOR	GOA	REG
1	(Kuwait) Al-Qadsia (H)	3	3	0	0	6	1	+5	9	Quarter-finals		3–0	2–1	1–0
2	(Bangladesh) Fortis	3	1	0	2	4	6	−2	3 (Note: Head-to-head goals scored: Fortis 1, Goa 0, Regar-TadAZ –1.)				1–2	3–1
3	(India) Goa	3	1	0	2	4	5	−1	3					1–2
4	(Tajikistan) Regar-TadAZ	3	1	0	2	3	5	−2	3					

Source: AFC
Rules for classification: Group stage tiebreakers
(H) Hosts
Notes:

17 October 2026 Group stage	Goa (India)	1–2	(Tajikistan) Regar-TadAZ	Hawally, Kuwait
21:55 UTC+5:30	Chiki 7'	AFC Report; GSA Report	Davlatov 85', 90'	Stadium: Mohammed Al-Hamad Stadium; Attendance: 298; Referee: Wissam Rabbie (Syria)

20 October 2026 Group stage	Fortis (Bangladesh)	1–2	(India) Goa	Hawally, Kuwait
18:55 UTC+5:30	Tudu 78'	AFC Report; GSA Report	Ortiz 6'; Chiki 85'	Stadium: Mohammed Al-Hamad Stadium; Attendance: 120; Referee: Mohamed Javiz (Maldives)

23 October 2026 Group stage	Goa (India)	1–2	(Kuwait) Al-Qadsia	Hawally, Kuwait
23:00 UTC+5:30	Chiki 21'	AFC Report; GSA Report	Khabba 10', 49'	Stadium: Mohammed Al-Hamad Stadium; Attendance: 3,000; Referee: Izzul Fikri (Malaysia)

== AFC club competitions (women's) ==
=== AFC Women's Champions League ===
==== Preliminary Group A ====
Pos	Team	Pld	W	D	L	GF	GA	GD	Pts	Qualification
1	(India) East Bengal	3	3	0	0	18	0	+18	9	Advance to group stage
2	(Malaysia) Sabah (H)	3	2	0	1	15	3	+12	6	
3	(Bangladesh) Rajshahi Stars	3	1	0	2	9	6	+3	3	
4	(Guam) Rovers	3	0	0	3	0	33	−33	0	

Source: AFC
Rules for classification: Tiebreakers
(H) Hosts

17 August 2026 Preliminary Round	East Bengal (India)	4–0	(Bangladesh) Rajshahi Stars	Sabah, Malaysia
13:30 IST	Anokye 9' (pen.), 38'; Oraon 26'; Guguloth 71'	AFC Report; GSA Report		Stadium: Likas Stadium; Attendance: 80; Referee: Mu Mingxin (China)

20 August 2026 Preliminary Round	Rovers (Guam)	0–12	(India) East Bengal	Sabah, Malaysia
13:30 IST		AFC Report; GSA Report	Naorem 6', 23'; Oraon 15'; Anokye 48', 58'; Antwi 49'; Raul 51'; Hemam 56'; Opoku 64', 70'; Kayenpaibam 73'; Guguloth 90+3'	Stadium: Likas Stadium; Attendance: 40; Referee: Hanine Merhi (Lebanon)

23 August 2026 Preliminary Round	East Bengal (India)	2–0	(Malaysia) Sabah	Sabah, Malaysia
17:30 IST	Anokye 68'; Guguloth 87'	AFC Report; GSA Report		Stadium: Likas Stadium; Attendance: 548; Referee: Mu Mingxin (China)

==== Main Group B ====
Pos	Team	Pld	W	D	L	GF	GA	GD	Pts	Qualification
1	(North Korea) April 25	3	3	0	0	10	1	+9	9	Advance to Quarter-finals
2	(South Korea) Hwacheon KSPO	3	2	0	1	8	4	+4	6	Advance to Quarter-finals
3	(India) East Bengal (H)	3	1	0	2	3	7	−4	3	Advance to Quarter-finals
4	(Vietnam) Hồ Chí Minh City	3	0	0	3	2	11	−9	0	

Source: AFC
Rules for classification: Tiebreakers
(H) Hosts

1 November 2026 Group stage	Hồ Chí Minh City (Vietnam)	1–2	(India) East Bengal	Kolkata, India
20:00 IST	Đậu Nguyễn Quỳnh Anh 60'	AFC Report; GSA Report	Ikwaput 21' (pen.), 34'	Stadium: Kishore Bharati Krirangan; Attendance: 522; Referee: Yoshimi Yamashita (Japan)

4 November 2026 Group stage	East Bengal (India)	1–4	(South Korea) Hwacheon KSPO	Kolkata, India
20:00 IST	Ikwaput 17'	AFC Report; GSA Report	Lee Su-bin 26'; Wie Jae-eun 53' (pen.), 76'; Mun Eun-ju 56'	Stadium: Kishore Bharati Krirangan; Referee: Mu Mingxin (China)

7 November 2026 Group stage	East Bengal (India)	0–2	(North Korea) April 25	Kolkata, India
20:00 IST		AFC Report; GSA Report	Han Jin-hong 2'; Oh Sol-song 43'	Stadium: Kishore Bharati Krirangan; Referee: Mahnaz Zokaee (Iran)

==== Quarter-finals ====
27–28 March 2027 Quarter-finals	TBD	v	(India) East Bengal
--:-- IST		[ AFC Report] [ GSA Report]

== Men's club football ==
=== Indian Super League ===
The Indian Super League will start on 4 September 2026 February and will end in April 2027.

Pos	Team	Pld	W	D	L	GF	GA	GD	Pts	Qualification
1	Bengaluru	5	4	1	0	10	4	+6	13	League Shield Winners and qualification for the Challenge League preliminary stage and semi-finals
2	Mohun Bagan (Note: If Mohun Bagan SG, who are banned from AFC competitions until 2028–29 season. If they become Indian Super League champions, the ISL league runners-up will qualify for Challenge League preliminary stage.)	5	4	0	1	8	5	+3	12	Qualification for the SAFF Club Championship and semi-finals
3	NorthEast United	5	3	2	0	8	2	+6	11	Qualification for the knockouts
4	Delhi	6	2	2	2	12	10	+2	8	Qualification for the knockouts
5	East Bengal	4	2	1	1	14	8	+6	7	Qualification for the knockouts
6	Punjab	4	2	1	1	7	5	+2	7	Qualification for the knockouts
7	Goa	4	1	2	1	5	5	0	5	
8	Chennaiyin	5	1	2	2	6	7	−1	5	
9	Kerala Blasters	4	1	2	1	3	4	−1	5	
10	Churchill Brothers	4	1	0	3	4	10	−6	3	
11	Odisha	4	0	2	2	4	6	−2	2	
12	Mumbai City	5	0	2	3	4	8	−4	2	
13	Inter Kashi	5	0	1	4	3	13	−10	1	
14	Diamond Harbour (R)	0	0	0	0	0	0	0	0	Barred and relegated to 2027–28 IFL

Updated to match(es) played on 7 November 2026. Source: Indian Super League
Rules for classification: 1) points; 2) goal difference; 3) number of goals scored; 4) head-to-head points; 5) head-to-head goal difference; 6) head-to-head goals scored; 7) fair play ranking; 8) drawing of lots
(Note: Head-to-head record is used only after all the matches between the teams in question have been played).
(R) Relegated

=== Indian Football League ===
The Indian Football League will start on 16 October 2026 and will end on 30 May 2027.

Pos	Team	Pld	W	D	L	GF	GA	GD	Pts	Qualification
1	Gokulam Kerala	4	4	0	0	10	4	+6	12	Promotion to 2027-28 ISL
2	Dempo	4	3	0	1	6	4	+2	9	
3	Chanmari	3	2	1	0	7	3	+4	7	
4	Shillong Lajong	4	2	1	1	5	4	+1	7	
5	Nagaland United	3	2	0	1	6	3	+3	6	
6	Bengaluru United	4	1	2	1	8	8	0	5	
7	Sreenidi Deccan	4	1	2	1	5	5	0	5	
8	Rajasthan United	4	1	0	3	3	6	−3	3	
9	Real Kashmir	3	0	2	1	4	6	−2	2	
10	Mohammedan	3	0	0	3	4	9	−5	0	Relegation to 2027-28 IL2
11	Samaleswari	4	0	0	4	3	9	−6	0	Relegation to 2027-28 IL2

Updated to match(es) played on 20 November 2026. Source: IFL
Rules for classification: 1) Points; 2) Head-to-head points; 3) Head-to-head goal difference; 4) Total goal difference; 5) Total number of goals scored; 6) drawing of lots
(Note: Head-to-head record is used only after all the matches between the teams in question have been played)

=== I-League 2 ===
The I-League 2 will start in October 2026 and will end on 11 April 2027.

Pos	Team	Pld	W	D	L	GF	GA	GD	Pts	Promotion or relegation
1	Banaras Baghpat	0	0	0	0	0	0	0	0	Promotion to IFL
2	Morning Star	0	0	0	0	0	0	0	0	Promotion to IFL
3	MYJ–GMSC	0	0	0	0	0	0	0	0	
4	Namdhari	0	0	0	0	0	0	0	0	
5	Raengdai	0	0	0	0	0	0	0	0	
6	Sporting Bengaluru	0	0	0	0	0	0	0	0	
7	Sporting Goa	0	0	0	0	0	0	0	0	
8	Sudeva Delhi	0	0	0	0	0	0	0	0	
9	United	0	0	0	0	0	0	0	0	Relegation to IL3

Source: IFL AIFF
Rules for classification: 1) points; 2) Head-to-head result; 3) goal difference; 4) goals scored; 5) fair play ranking; 6) drawing of lots.

== Cup competitions (men's) ==
=== Durand Cup ===
The Durand Cup started on 25 July and ended on 23 August 2026.

Group stage

This phase starts from 25 July and ends on 13 August 2026.

Group A
Pos	Team	Pld	Pts
1	Mohun Bagan (H)	3	9
2	East Bengal (H)	3	6
3	South United	3	3
4	CISF Protectors	3	0

Source: DFTS
(H) Hosts

Group B
Pos	Team	Pld	Pts
1	Indian Army	3	9
2	Samaleswari	3	6
3	Mohammedan (H)	3	3
4	Banaras Baghpat	3	0

Source: DFTS
(H) Hosts

Group C
Pos	Team	Pld	Pts
1	Delhi	3	9
2	Jamshedpur (H)	3	6
3	Indian Air Force	3	3
4	Sri Lanka Army	3	0

Source: DFTS
(H) Hosts

Group D
Pos	Team	Pld	Pts
1	Raengdai (H)	3	6
2	TRAU (H)	3	4
3	NEROCA (H)	3	4
4	Indian Navy	3	3

Source: DFTS
(H) Hosts

Group E
Pos	Team	Pld	Pts
1	Shillong Lajong (H)	3	7
2	Langsning (H)	3	5
3	Nongkseh SS&CC (H)	3	4
4	Mumbay	3	0

Source: DFTS
(H) Hosts

Group F
Pos	Team	Pld	Pts
1	NorthEast United (H)	3	9
2	Bodoland (H)	3	6
3	Srinagar FC1	3	3
4	Morning Star (H)	3	0

Source: DFTS
(H) Hosts

Ranking of second-placed teams

Pos	Team	Pld	Pts
1	East Bengal	3	6
2	Jamshedpur	3	6
3	Bodoland	3	6
4	Samaleswari	3	6
5	Langsning	3	5
6	TRAU	3	4

Source: DFTS

Bracket

This phase starts from 16 August and the competition concluded with the final match on 23 August 2026.

Quarter-finals
16 Aug – Ranchi
Delhi	5
Raengdai	1
16 Aug – Kolkata
East Bengal	1
Indian Army	0
17 Aug – Kolkata
Mohun Bagan (p)	1 (9)
Jamshedpur	1 (8)
17 Aug – Shillong
NorthEast United	5
Shillong Lajong	2

Semi-finals
19 Aug – Kolkata
Delhi	0 (3)
East Bengal (p)	0 (5)
20 Aug – Shillong
Mohun Bagan (p)	0 (4)
NorthEast United	0 (3)

Final
23 Aug – Kolkata
East Bengal	4
Mohun Bagan	1

Final

23 August 2026
19:00 IST
Match 43 (Final)

East Bengal	4–1	Mohun Bagan
Bipin 10'; Lalrindika 11', 22', 44'	Report; PDF Report	Manvir 33'

Vivekananda Yuba Bharati Krirangan, Kolkata
Attendance: 60,129
Referee: Aditya Purakayastha
Man of the Match: Edmund Lalrindika (East Bengal)

== Women's club football ==
=== Indian Women's League ===
The Indian Football League will start on 16 October 2026.

Pos	Team	Pld	W	D	L	GF	GA	GD	Pts	Qualification or relegation
1	Juba Sangha	1	1	0	0	2	0	+2	3	Qualification for AFC Champions League
2	Sethu	1	1	0	0	2	1	+1	3	
3	Nita	1	1	0	0	2	1	+1	3	
4	East Bengal	1	1	0	0	1	0	+1	3	
5	Garhwal United	1	0	0	1	1	2	−1	0	
6	Kickstart	1	0	0	1	1	2	−1	0	
7	Gokulam Kerala	1	0	0	1	0	1	−1	0	Relegation to Indian Women's League 2
8	HOPS	1	0	0	1	0	2	−2	0	Relegation to Indian Women's League 2

Updated to match(es) played on 17 November 2026. Source: IFL
Rules for classification: 1) points; 2) head-to-head points; 3) head-to-head goal difference; 4) goal difference; 5) number of goals scored; 6)drawing of lots

=== Indian Women's League 2 ===
Final round

Pos	Team	Pld	W	D	L	GF	GA	GD	Pts	Promotion
1	Jakrem	0	0	0	0	0	0	0	0	Promotion to IWL
2	Kemp	0	0	0	0	0	0	0	0	Promotion to IWL
3	Sesa	0	0	0	0	0	0	0	0	
4	Sporting Bacaim	0	0	0	0	0	0	0	0	
5	United Kolkata	0	0	0	0	0	0	0	0	
6	Youth Welfare Club	0	0	0	0	0	0	0	0	

Updated to match(es) played on unknown. Source: IFL
Rules for classification: 1) points; 2) head-to-head points; 3) head-to-head goal difference; 4) goal difference; 5) number of goals scored; 6) drawing of lots

== Youth football ==
=== U17 Women's Youth League ===
This was a historic first edition of a club youth tournament organised in the Indian women's football.

Group A
Pos	Team	Pld	Pts
1	Zinc FA	3	9
2	DFA Raisen	3	4
3	KMP Aspire FC	3	4
4	Roots FC	3	0

Source: Football.in

Group C
Pos	Team	Pld	Pts
1	NITA FA	3	9
2	Kickstart	3	6
3	Mumbai Knights	3	3
4	DKR FA	3	0

Source: Football.in

Group B
Pos	Team	Pld	Pts
1	Garhwal United	3	9
2	RKM Academy	3	4
3	Kemp FC	3	2
4	PFC Kerala	3	1

Source: Football.in

Group D
Pos	Team	Pld	Pts
1	HOPS	3	9
2	Sethu	3	6
3	Krida Prabodhini FA	3	3
4	MGM Ambush FC	3	0

Source: Football.in

==== Knockout stage ====
Quarter-finals
24 July 2026 – Narayanpur
Zinc FA	3
RKM FA	2
25 July 2026 – Narayanpur
NITA FA	3
Sethu FC	1
24 July 2026 – Narayanpur
Garhwal United	1
DFA Raisen	0
25 July 2026 – Narayanpur
HOPS	3
Kickstart	2

Semi-finals
27 July 2026 – Narayanpur
Zinc FA	0
NITA FA	2
27 July 2026 – Narayanpur
Garhwal United	0
HOPS	2

Final
29 July 2026 – Narayanpur
NITA FA	1(2)
HOPS	1(4)

== See also ==
- Football in India
- 2027 in Indian sports
- 2026 in Indian sports
