= 2026–27 I-League 2 =

5th season of the Indian football third tier

- Season: 2026–27
- Dates: 1 February – 11 April 2027

The 2026–27 I-League 2 will be the 5th season of the I-League 2, the third tier of the Indian football league system. Delhi FC were the defending champions, having won the 2025–26 I-League 2.

== Club changes ==
The following clubs changed since last season.

#	Club	Path
Entered I-League 2
1	Namdhari	Relegated from IFL 2025–26 ▼
2	FC Banaras Baghpat	Promoted from I-League 3 2025–26 ▲
3	FC Raengdai	Promoted from I-League 3 2025–26 ▲
Exited I-League 2
1	Delhi FC	Promoted to IFL 2026–27 ▲
2	Bengaluru United	Promoted to IFL 2026–27 ▲
3	NEROCA	Relegated to I-League 3 2026-27 ▼
4	SA Tirur	Relegated to I-League 3 2026-27 ▼

== Clubs ==
2026 Indian Football league 2 group stage clubs

Club	Location	Stadium	Capacity
MYJ–GMSC	Mumbai, Maharashtra	Cooperage Ground	5,000
Morning Star	Diphu, Assam	KASA Stadium	9,000
Sporting Goa	Panaji, Goa	Bambolim Stadium	3,000
Raengdai	Noney, Manipur	Khuman Lampak Stadium	35,285
Sudeva Delhi	New Delhi, Delhi	Sudeva Residential Academy	TBC
Namdhari	Bhaini Sahib, Punjab	Namdhari Stadium	1,000
United	Kalyani, West Bengal	Kalyani Stadium	20,000
Banaras Baghpat	Baghpat, Uttar Pradesh		
Sporting Bengaluru	Bengaluru, Karnataka	HAL Stadium	TBC

== League table ==
Pos	Team	Pld	W	D	L	GF	GA	GD	Pts	Promotion or relegation
1	Banaras Baghpat	0	0	0	0	0	0	0	0	Promotion to IFL
2	Morning Star	0	0	0	0	0	0	0	0	Promotion to IFL
3	MYJ–GMSC	0	0	0	0	0	0	0	0	
4	Namdhari	0	0	0	0	0	0	0	0	
5	Raengdai	0	0	0	0	0	0	0	0	
6	Sporting Bengaluru	0	0	0	0	0	0	0	0	
7	Sporting Goa	0	0	0	0	0	0	0	0	
8	Sudeva Delhi	0	0	0	0	0	0	0	0	
9	United	0	0	0	0	0	0	0	0	Relegation to IL3

Source: IFL AIFF
Rules for classification: 1) points; 2) Head-to-head result; 3) goal difference; 4) goals scored; 5) fair play ranking; 6) drawing of lots.

== Results ==
Home \ Away	FCB	FCR	KAM	MYJ	NAM	SCB	SCG	SUD	USC
Banaras Baghpat	—								
Raengdai		—							
Morning Star			—						
MYJ–GMSC				—					
Namdhari					—				
Sporting Bengaluru						—			
Sporting Goa							—		
Sudeva Delhi								—	
United									—

Source: IFL
Legend: Blue = home team win; Yellow = draw; Red = away team win.

=== Form ===
Team ╲ Round	1	2	3	4	5	6	7	8	9	10
Banaras Baghpat										
Raengdai										
Morning Star										
MYJ–GMSC										
Namdhari										
Sporting Bengaluru										
Sporting Goa										
Sudeva Delhi										
United										

Source: IFL
W = Win; D = Draw; L = Loss; × = No match scheduled in the round

=== Standings by Rounds ===
Team ╲ Round	1	2	3	4	5	6	7	8	9	10
Banaras Baghpat										
Raengdai										
Morning Star										
MYJ–GMSC										
Namdhari										
Sporting Bengaluru										
Sporting Goa										
Sudeva Delhi										
United										

= Promotion; = Relegation
Notes: * indicates a team that did not play during the gameweek

== See also ==
- Men
  - 2026–27 ISL
  - 2026–27 IFL
  - 2026–27 I-League 3
  - 2026–27 Indian State Leagues
  - 2026 Super Cup
  - 2026 Durand Cup
  - 2027 RFD League
- Women
  - 2026–27 IWL
  - 2026–27 IWL 2
