= Abdul Hannan =

Abdul Hannan may refer to:

- Abdul Hannan (footballer) (born 2004), Indian football defender
- Abdul Hannan (politician) (1938–2009), Bangladeshi politician
- Md Abdul Hannan, Bangladeshi diplomat
- Md. Abdul Hannan (politician)
