= 2026–27 Indian Football League =

Indian Football League
- Season: 2026–27
- Dates: 30 October 2026 – 30 May 2027
- Country: India
- Teams: 11
- Matches: 20
- Goals: 61 (3.05 per match)
- Top goalscorer: Crislan (6 goals)
- Biggest home win: Gokulam Kerala 3–2 Samaleswari (31 October 2026); Dempo 1–0 Bengaluru United (1 November 2026); Bengaluru United 4–3 Mohammedan (6 November 2026); Shillong Lajong 2–1 Sreenidi Deccan (13 November 2026); Dempo 2–1 Shillong Lajong (19 November 2026)
- Biggest away win: Rajasthan United 1–4 Chanmari (20 November 2026); Mohammedan 1–4 Gokulam Kerala (20 November 2026)
- Highest scoring: Bengaluru United 4–3 Mohammedan (6 November 2026)
- Longest winning run: Gokulam Kerala (4 games)
- Longest unbeaten run: Gokulam Kerala (4 games)
- Longest winless run: Samaleswari (4 games)
- Longest losing run: Samaleswari (4 games)
- Highest attendance: 9,786; Real Kashmir 1–3 Nagaland United (30 October 2026)
- Lowest attendance: 200; Bengaluru United 4–3 Mohammedan (6 November 2026); Dempo 1–2 Chanmari (15 November 2026)
- Total attendance: 54,569
- Average attendance: 2,728
- All statistics correct as of 20 October 2026.

The 2026–27 Indian Football League is the fifth season of the Indian Football League as the second tier of the Indian football league system, which started on October 30, 2026. Diamond Harbour were the reigning champions, having won the 2025–26 I-League.

== Developments ==
=== July ===
- On 27 July 2026, the All India Football Federation (AIFF) confirmed that the season would begin on 16 October 2026. The governing body also approved a regulation permitting a maximum of three foreign players in each starting line-up, aimed at increasing playing time for Indian players.
- The Indian Football League (IFL) clubs collectively agreed to enrol in the AIFF Academy Accreditation Programme, with each club committing to attain a minimum two-star accreditation before the 2027–28 season. The clubs also committed to developing their academies to achieve a minimum three-star accreditation by 2030, as part of a long-term effort to strengthen youth development and player pathways.
- Among the clubs, Sreenidi Deccan received a four-star rating, Dempo SC three stars, Shillong Lajong and Rajasthan United two stars each, and Gokulam Kerala one star. Minerva Academy, which has a partnership with Delhi FC as part of the latter's youth development structure, received a five-star rating. Aizawl FC, Chanmari FC, Mohammedan SC, Bengaluru United and Real Kashmir did not appear among the accredited academies listed for the 2026–27 cycle.

=== August ===
- In early August 2026, Aizawl FC reached an agreement to transfer its IFL sporting rights to Nagaland United, subject to approval from the AIFF. The proposed move would see Nagaland United play its home matches in Dimapur, while Aizawl would continue operating in Mizoram.
- In August 2026, several IFL clubs raised concerns over the financial contribution required to participate in the competition. The proposed contribution was reported to have increased substantially from approximately ₹30 lakh (US$32,000) in the previous season to around ₹1.3 crore (US$140,000) for the 2026–27 season, prompting concerns over the financial sustainability of participation.
- Earlier in August, Dempo SC informed the AIFF that it could reconsider its future participation in the IFL if the substantial increase in the financial contribution was not reconsidered.
- On 16 August 2026, Samaleswari SC were reported to be in the final stages of negotiations to acquire Delhi FC's sporting licence and enter the league.
- Rajasthan United began considering Kokrajhar as an alternative home venue for the 2026–27 season due to floodlight-related challenges at Vidyadhar Nagar Stadium. The club was reported to be exploring a possible arrangement with the Bodoland administration.

=== September ===
- On 8 September 2026, it was reported that the season would begin on 30 October, later than previously. The officials also met Prasar Bharati CEO Gaurav Dwivedi in New Delhi to discuss a potential broadcast partnership, with DD Sports among the possible outlets for broadcasting.
- On 23 September 2026, the AIFF significantly reduced the participation fee for the season to ₹20 lakh (US$21,000). The initial fee had been proposed at around ₹1.3 crore (US$140,000), but participating clubs had raised concerns over the financial burden. The reduction followed discussions between the clubs and the federation, with sponsorship-related support also reportedly linked to the reduction.
- On 30 September 2026, it was reported that the IFL would open the season in Srinagar for the first time, with Real Kashmir hosting debutants Nagaland United at the TRC Football Stadium on 30 October.

== Club changes ==
The following clubs have changed division since the 2025–26 season:

#	Club	Path	Notes
Entered IFL
1	Bengaluru United	Promoted from 2025–26 IL2 ▲	
2	Mohammedan	Relegated from 2025–26 ISL ▼	
3	Samaleswari	Ownership transfer ▲	License acquired from Delhi
4	Nagaland United	License acquired from Aizawl ▲	Last played and finished third in the 2025 Nagaland Super League
Exited IFL
1	Delhi	Ownership transferred to Samaleswari	Promoted from 2025–26 IL2 as champions, but transferred their IFL license and ownership to Samaleswari
2	Aizawl	Withdrew and voluntarily relegated to Mizoram Premier League ▼	Transferred their IFL sporting license to Nagaland United
3	Diamond Harbour	Promoted to 2026–27 ISL ▲	After promotion, the club was barred from participation in the ISL due to non-payment of outstanding participation fee
4	Namdhari	Relegated to 2026–27 IL2 ▼	

== Clubs ==
Locations of the Indian Football League clubs

Club	Location	Stadium	Capacity
Bengaluru United	Bengaluru, Karnataka	Bangalore Football Stadium	8,400
Chanmari	Aizawl, Mizoram	Rajiv Gandhi Stadium	20,000
Dempo	Margao, Goa	Fatorda Stadium	19,000
Gokulam Kerala	Kozhikode, Kerala	EMS Stadium	50,000
Mohammedan	Kolkata, West Bengal	Kalyani Stadium	20,000
Mohammedan	Kolkata, West Bengal	Kishore Bharati Krirangan	12,000
Nagaland United	Chümoukedima, Nagaland	Chümoukedima Football Stadium	5,000
Rajasthan United	Jaipur, Rajasthan	Vidyadhar Nagar Stadium	3,000
Real Kashmir	Srinagar, Jammu & Kashmir	TRC Turf Ground	10,000
Samaleswari	Rourkela, Odisha	Birsa Munda Athletic Stadium	9,000
Shillong Lajong	Shillong, Meghalaya	SSA Stadium	5,000
Sreenidi Deccan	Hyderabad, Telangana	Deccan Arena	1,500

== Personnel and sponsorship ==
Team	Head coach	Captain	Kit manufacturer	Kit sponsors	
Team	Head coach	Captain	Kit manufacturer	Main	Other(s)
Bengaluru United	(India) Nallappan Mohanraj	(India) Lalramdinsanga Ralte	HYVE Sports	Nimida	List: Front: None; Back: None; Sleeves: None; Shorts: None
Chanmari	(India) Steven Dias	(India) Zothanmawia	Shiv Naresh	None	List: Front: None; Back: None; Sleeves: None; Shorts: None
Dempo	(India) Samir Naik	(Ghana) Richmond Owusu	Shiv Naresh	Dempo	List: Front: None; Back: None; Sleeves: None; Shorts: None
Gokulam Kerala	(Brazil) Carlos Eduardo Parreira	(India) Shighil Nambrath	MS Sportswear	Bandhan Bank	List: Front: None; Back: None; Sleeves: None; Shorts: None
Mohammedan	(India) Saheed Ramon	(India) Mahitosh Roy	Trak Only	None	List: Front: None; Back: Luxury Living Furniture; Sleeves: None; Shorts: None
Nagaland United	(India) Kaizad Ambapardiwalla	(India) Rohmingthanga	Made by club	Visit Nagaland	List: Front: None; Back: None; Sleeves: None; Shorts: None
Rajasthan United	(Italy) Giuseppe Cristaldi	(Brazil) Diego Maurício	King Sports	Vertak Group	List: Front: None; Back: None; Sleeves: None; Shorts: None
Real Kashmir	(India) Ishfaq Ahmed	(Trinidad and Tobago) Marcus Joseph	Hummel	Livpure	List: Front: None; Back: Lava; Sleeves: None; Shorts: None
Samaleswari	(India) Abdul Azim Siddique	(India) Basit Ahmed Bhat	Nivia	None	List: Front: None; Back: None; Sleeves: None; Shorts: None
Shillong Lajong	(India) Birendra Thapa	(India) Kenstar Kharshong	King Sports	Meghalaya Tourism	List: Front: Star Cement; Back: None; Sleeves: None; Shorts: None
Sreenidi Deccan	(Spain) Antonio Rueda	(Colombia) David Castañeda	HYVE Sports	Sreenidhi University	List: Front: None; Back: Sreenidhi Sports School; Sleeves: Apollo Hospitals Hyderabad, CSSH; Shorts: Origin Nutrition, SNIST

== Coaching changes ==
Club	Outgoing coach	Manner of departure	Date of vacancy	Position in the table	Incoming coach	Date of appointment
Gokulam Kerala	(India) Renjith CM	End of interim spell	29 July 2026	Pre-season	(Brazil) Carlos Parreira	30 July 2026
Sreenidi Deccan	(Portugal) Carlos Vaz Pinto	End of contract	30 July 2026	Pre-season	(Spain) Antonio Rueda	4 August 2026
Chanmari	(India) Dipankur Sharma	Signed by Sporting Clube de Goa	26 August 2026	Pre-season	(India) Steven Dias	15 September 2026
Mohammedan	(India) Mehrajuddin Wadoo	Signed by AIFF for India U17	2 September 2026	Pre-season	(Nigeria) Saheed Ramon	2 September 2026
Rajasthan United	(India) Vikas Rawat	End of interim spell	13 October 2026	Pre-season	(Italy) Giuseppe Cristaldi	13 October 2026

== Foreign players ==
Bold denotes the player was signed mid-season.

Beginning this season, the Governing Council approved a regulation permitting a maximum of three foreign players on the pitch at a time, down from four from last season.

Club	Player 1	Player 2	Player 3	Player 4	Player 5	Player 6	Unregistered player(s)	Former player(s)
Bengaluru United	(Colombia) Maikoll Herrera	(Colombia) Brayan Cundumí	(Russia) Marat Tarek					
Chanmari	(Brazil) Denilson	(Brazil) Gabriel Paz	(Senegal) Seila Toure					
Dempo	(Brazil) Dé	(Ghana) Asonaning Budu	(Ghana) Richmond Owusu	(Brazil) Jonathan Pereira Silva				
Gokulam Kerala	(Brazil) Crislan	(Brazil) Victor	(Ghana) Denny Antwi	(Spain) Mikel Kortazar	(Brazil) Raniel		(Spain) Hugo Diáz (Portugal) João Rodrigues	
Mohammedan								
Nagaland United	(Nepal) Kiran Chemjong							
Rajasthan United	(Brazil) Diego Maurício	(The Gambia) Foday Trawally	(Ghana) Evans Osei Wusu	(Spain) Adri Castellano	(Trinidad and Tobago) Judah García	(Nigeria) Sabir Isah Musa		
Real Kashmir	(Burkina Faso) Eric Traoré	(Cameroon) Alain Eyenga	(Lesotho) Thabiso Brown	(Trinidad and Tobago) Marcus Joseph				
Samaleswari	(Argentina) Jorge Pereyra Díaz	(Liberia) Jamal Arago	(Ghana) Kamal Issah	(Morocco) Mohamed El Jaaouani	(United States) Veer Joshi			
Shillong Lajong	(Brazil) Arthur Pangaro	(Brazil) Joedson dos Santos	(Brazil) Jota					
Sreenidi Deccan	(Brazil) Vitinho	(Colombia) David Castañeda	(Portugal) Adriano Castanheira	(Senegal) Pape Gassama	(Togo) Hadi Idrissou	(Paraguay) Nicolás Morínigo		

== Regular season ==
=== League table ===
Pos	Team	Pld	W	D	L	GF	GA	GD	Pts	Qualification
1	Gokulam Kerala	4	4	0	0	10	4	+6	12	Promotion to 2027-28 ISL
2	Dempo	4	3	0	1	6	4	+2	9	
3	Chanmari	3	2	1	0	7	3	+4	7	
4	Shillong Lajong	4	2	1	1	5	4	+1	7	
5	Nagaland United	3	2	0	1	6	3	+3	6	
6	Bengaluru United	4	1	2	1	8	8	0	5	
7	Sreenidi Deccan	4	1	2	1	5	5	0	5	
8	Rajasthan United	4	1	0	3	3	6	−3	3	
9	Real Kashmir	3	0	2	1	4	6	−2	2	
10	Mohammedan	3	0	0	3	4	9	−5	0	Relegation to 2027-28 IL2
11	Samaleswari	4	0	0	4	3	9	−6	0	Relegation to 2027-28 IL2

Updated to match(es) played on 20 November 2026. Source: IFL
Rules for classification: 1) Points; 2) Head-to-head points; 3) Head-to-head goal difference; 4) Total goal difference; 5) Total number of goals scored; 6) drawing of lots
(Note: Head-to-head record is used only after all the matches between the teams in question have been played)

== Results ==
=== Match by match ===
Home \ Away	BGU	CHN	DEM	GOK	MSC	NAG	RAJ	REK	SAM	SHL	SRD
Bengaluru United					4–3			2–2			2–2
Chanmari											
Dempo	1–0	1–2								2–1	
Gokulam Kerala									3–2		
Mohammedan				1–4						0–1	
Nagaland United				1–2							
Rajasthan United		1–4		0–1							0–1
Real Kashmir						1–3					1–1
Samaleswari			1–2			0–2	0–2				
Shillong Lajong		1–1									2–1
Sreenidi Deccan											

Updated to match(es) played on 20 November 2026. Source: IFL Fixtures
Legend: Blue = home team win; Yellow = draw; Red = away team win.

=== Form ===
Team ╲ Round	1	2	3	4	5	6	7	8	9	10	11	12	13	14	15	16	17	18	19	20	21	22
Bengaluru United	L	W	D	D		×																
Chanmari	×	D	W	W																		
Dempo	W	W	L	W				×														
Gokulam Kerala	W	W	W	W	×																	
Mohammedan	L	L	×	L																		
Nagaland United	W	×	L	W																		
Rajasthan United	L	L	W	L							×											
Real Kashmir	L	D	D	×																		
Samaleswari	L	L	L	L					×													
Shillong Lajong	W	D	W	L						×												
Sreenidi Deccan	W	D	L	D			×															

Updated to match(es) played on 19 November 2026. Source: IFL
W = Win; D = Draw; L = Lose; × = No match scheduled in the round

=== Position by gameweek ===
Team ╲ Round	1	2	3	4	5	6	7	8	9	10	11	12	13	14	15	16	17	18	19	20	21	22
Bengaluru United	7	6	5	6																		
Chanmari	6^{*}	7	4	3																		
Dempo	5	2	3	2																		
Gokulam Kerala	2	1	1	1																		
Mohammedan	10	10	10^{*}	10																		
Nagaland United	1	5^{*}	7	5																		
Rajasthan United	8	11	8	8																		
Real Kashmir	11	8	9	9^{*}																		
Samaleswari	9	9	11	11																		
Shillong Lajong	3	3	2	4																		
Sreenidi Deccan	4	4	6	7																		

Updated to match(es) played on 15 November 2026. Source: IFL
= Promotion; = Relegation
Notes: * indicates a team that did not play during the gameweek

== Season statistics ==
As of 20 November 2026

=== Top scorers ===
Rank	Player	Club	Goals
1	(Brazil) Crislan	Gokulam Kerala	6
2	(India) Laximanrao Rane	Dempo	3
2	(India) Zomuansanga	Nagaland United	3
4	(Russia) Marat Tarek	Bengaluru United	2
4	(India) Ngangbam Naocha	Bengaluru United	2
4	(Colombia) David Castañeda	Sreenidi Deccan	2
4	(India) Lalthanzuala	Chanmari	2
4	(India) Vanlalhriatzuala K	Nagaland United	2
9	(India) JH Remlala	Nagaland United	1
9	(India) Nelson Rymbai	Shillong Lajong	1
9	(India) Abelson Jachi	Shillong Lajong	1
9	(Brazil) Joedson dos Santos	Shillong Lajong	1
9	(India) Tremiki Lamurong	Shillong Lajong	1
9	(India) Damaitphang Lyngdoh	Shillong Lajong	1
9	(India) Makan Chothe	Gokulam Kerala	1
9	(Brazil) Victor	Gokulam Kerala	1
9	(India) Joby Justin	Gokulam Kerala	1
9	(India) Shighil Nambrath	Gokulam Kerala	1
9	(Argentina) Jorge Pereyra Díaz	Samaleswari	1
9	(India) Kartik Choudhary	Samaleswari	1
9	(India) Nishu Kumar	Sreenidi Deccan	1
9	(Hungary) Nicolás Morínigo	Sreenidi Deccan	1
9	(India) Lalromawia	Sreenidi Deccan	1
9	(Ghana) Asonaning Budu	Dempo	1
9	(Ghana) Richmond Kwasi Owusu	Dempo	1
9	(Brazil) Dé	Dempo	1
9	(India) Gautam Virwani	Bengaluru United	1
9	(India) Akshunna Tyagi	Bengaluru United	1
9	(India) Abdul Hannan	Bengaluru United	1
9	(Colombia) Maikol Herrera	Bengaluru United	1
9	(Russia) Maharabam Maxion	Mohammedan	1
9	(India) Lalthankima	Mohammedan	1
9	(India) Lalremsanga Fanai	Mohammedan	1
9	(India) Jeremy Laldinpuia	Mohammedan	1
9	(Lesotho) Thabiso Brown	Real Kashmir	1
9	(India) Shanid Valan	Real Kashmir	1
9	(India) Zahir Khan K	Real Kashmir	1
9	(India) R. Ramdinthara	Chanmari	1
9	(Brazil) Denilson	Chanmari	1
9	(Brazil) Gabriel Paz	Chanmari	1
9	(India) Thomyo Shimray	Rajasthan United	1
9	(India) Brijesh Giri	Rajasthan United	1
9	(Nigeria) Sabir Isah Musa	Rajasthan United	1

=== Clean sheets ===
Rank	Player	Club	Clean sheets
1	(India) Ranit Sarkar	Shillong Lajong	1
1	(India) Kamaljit Singh	Sreenidi Deccan	1
1	(India) Subhajit Bhattacharjee	Dempo	1
1	(India) Shibinraj Kunniyil	Gokulam Kerala	1
1	(India) Amrit Gope	Rajasthan United	1
1	(India) Vanlalhriatpuia	Nagaland United	1

== Awards ==
=== Match awards ===
Player of the Match
Match	Player of the Match		Match	Player of the Match		Match	Player of the Match		Match	Player of the Match	
Match	Player	Club	Match	Player	Club	Match	Player	Club	Match	Player	Club
1	(India) Vanlalhriatzuala K	Nagaland United	29			57			84		
2	(India) Nelson Rymbai	Shillong Lajong	30			58			85		
3	(Brazil) Crislan	Gokulam Kerala	31			59			86		
4	(India) Nishu Kumar	Sreenidi Deccan	32			60			87		
5	(Ghana) Asonaning Budu	Dempo	33			61			88		
6	(Ghana) Richmond Kwasi Owusu	Dempo	34			62			89		
7	(Russia) Marat Tarek	Bengaluru United	35			63			90		
8	(India) Abelson Jachi	Shillong Lajong	36			64			91		
9	(Brazil) Crislan (2)	Gokulam Kerala	37			65			92		
10	(Lesotho) Thabiso Brown	Real Kashmir	38			66			93		
11	(Brazil) Joedson dos Santos	Shillong Lajong	39			67			94		
12	(India) Shanid Valan	Real Kashmir	40			68			95		
13	(Brazil) Crislan (3)	Gokulam Kerala	41			69			96		
14	(India) Lalthanzuala	Chanmari	42			70			97		
15	(India) Brijesh Giri	Rajasthan United	43			71			98		
16	(India) Ngangbam Naocha	Bengaluru United	44			72			99		
17	(India) Laximanrao Rane	Dempo	45			73			100		
18	(India) Zomuansanga	Nagaland United	46			74			101		
19	(India) Zothanmawia	Chanmari	47			75			102		
20	(Brazil) Crislan (4)	Gokulam Kerala	48			76			103		
21			49			77			104		
22			50			78			105		
23			51			79			106		
24			52			80			107		
25			53			81			108		
26			54			82			109		
27			55			83			110		
28			56								

== Attendance ==
=== Regular season ===
Pos	Team	Total	High	Low	Average	Change
1	Gokulam Kerala	7,543	7,543	7,543	7,543	n/a
2	Samaleswari	17,048	9,438	2,437	5,683	n/a
3	Real Kashmir	13,272	9,786	3,486	6,636	n/a
4	Shillong Lajong	9,472	5,012	4,460	4,736	n/a
5	Nagaland United	3,197	3,197	3,197	3,197	n/a
6	Mohammedan	781	560	221	391	−76.2%^{ǂ}
7	Rajasthan United	1,183	483	300	394	n/a
8	Bengaluru United	600	400	200	300	+67.6%^{†}
9	Dempo	900	400	200	300	n/a
10	Chanmari					n/a
11	Sreenidi Deccan	573	573	573	573	n/a
	League total	54,569	9,786	200	2,728	n/a

Source: ISL
Notes:
^{*} Attendance figures for the 2025–26 Indian Football League season are unavailable.
^{†} Bengaluru United played in the I-League 2 in the 2025–26 season.
^{ǂ} Mohammedan played in the Indian Super League in the 2025–26 season.

=== By home matches ===
Team \ Home Game	1	2	3	4	5	6	7	8	9	10	Total
Bengaluru United	200	400									600
Chanmari											
Dempo	400	200	300								900
Gokulam Kerala	7,543										7,543
Mohammedan	560	221									781
Nagaland United	3,197										3,197
Rajasthan United	400	300	483								1,183
Real Kashmir	9,786	3,486									13,272
Samaleswari	9,438	5,173	2,437								17,048
Shillong Lajong	5,012	4,460									9,472
Sreenidi Deccan	573										573

Legend: Highest Lowest

== See also ==
- Men
  - 2026–27 ISL
  - 2026–27 I-League 2
  - 2026–27 I-League 3
  - 2026–27 Indian State Leagues
  - 2026 Durand Cup
  - 2027 Federation Cup
- Women
  - 2026–27 IWL
  - 2026–27 IWL 2
