= 2026–27 Indian Super League =

Football league season in India

MG Indian Super League
- Season: 2026–27
- Dates: 10 October 2026 – 8 May 2027
- Country: India
- Teams: 14
- Relegated: Diamond Harbour
- Matches: 33
- Goals: 94 (2.85 per match)
- Top goalscorer: Aké Arnaud Loba; Borja Martínez; Messi Bouli (4)
- Biggest home win: NorthEast United 4–1 Kerala Blasters (18 October 2026)
- Biggest away win: Churchill Brothers 0–4 East Bengal (18 October 2026); Inter Kashi 1–5 East Bengal (23 October 2026)
- Highest scoring: Chennaiyin 5–3 East Bengal (7 November 2026)
- Longest winning run: 5 Matches; Mohun Bagan SG
- Longest unbeaten run: 5 Matches; NorthEast United; Bengaluru; Mohun Bagan SG
- Longest winless run: 5 Matches; Inter Kashi; Mumbai City
- Longest losing run: 3 Matches; Churchill Brothers; Inter Kashi
- Highest attendance: 40,014; Kerala Blasters 0-0 Mumbai City (25 October 2026)
- Lowest attendance: 1,026; Inter Kashi 0–3 SC Delhi (7 November 2026)
- Total attendance: 272,973
- Average attendance: 9,099
- All statistics correct as of 21 November 2026.

The 2026–27 Indian Super League, also known as the MG Indian Super League (due to sponsorship reasons with MG Motor), is the 13th season of the Indian Super League (ISL) and the 31st season of top-tier Indian football. The season began on 10 October 2026. Sony Sports and Google have acquired the league's media rights for the next two seasons. Sony Sports holds the satellite television rights for the Indian subcontinent, and streams matches on SonyLIV in India, while Google streams every match live on YouTube in India and worldwide.

East Bengal are the defending champions, having won their maiden Super League title and their fourth overall top-tier league title.

== Developments ==
=== March ===
- On 2 March 2026, the All India Football Federation (AIFF) invited bids for the commercial rights to its men's and women's club competitions for a minimum term of 15 years beginning with the 2026–27 season. The tender covered media, digital, data, sponsorship and other commercial assets attached to the Indian Super League (ISL) and Federation Cup, and was structured as a 15-year agreement with an optional five-year extension, a right of first refusal for the successful bidder and a five per cent annual increase in value.
- Three companies submitted bids. London-based Genius Sports and FanCode bid for the ISL and Federation Cup package.
- On 27 March 2026, the AIFF opened the technical bids in the morning and the commercial bids later the same day. Genius Sports emerged as the highest bidder for the men's package at approximately ₹64.39 crore (US$6.9 million) per year, or about ₹2,129 crore (US$230 million) across 20 years, while FanCode offered ₹36 crore (US$3.8 million) in the first year, amounting to roughly ₹1,190 crore (US$130 million) over the same period. The figures marked a sharp rise on the existing cycle, in which FanCode had acquired the 2025–26 ISL media rights for ₹8.62 crore (US$920,000) and production costs had left the federation with net revenue of about ₹3.4 crore (US$360,000).
- Under the model set out in the tender, the AIFF was to receive a fifth of the committed annual spend in advance, with 70 per cent of net revenue shared with the federation at the end of each season and 60 per cent of that sum distributed among the participating clubs. The two bids divided the stakeholders: the federation favoured Genius Sports for its larger guaranteed payments, while the clubs preferred FanCode's lower upfront commitment, which they argued left more scope for central revenue to reach them.
- On 28 March 2026, the ISL clubs wrote jointly to the AIFF asking it not to take a binding decision at the Executive Committee meeting scheduled for the following day, stating that the tender documents had been made available less than 12 hours before the bids were opened and seeking detailed presentations from both bidders.

=== May ===
- On 14 May 2026, the ISL clubs proposed that they take over the commercial running of the league themselves under a club-led model. The AIFF did not accept the proposal outright at that stage.
- On 17 May 2026, the AIFF Club Licensing Committee–First Instance Body granted the Premier 1 licence, with sanctions, to seven clubs — NorthEast United, East Bengal, Jamshedpur, Mumbai City, Bengaluru, Goa and Punjab. The applications of SC Delhi, Odisha, Mohun Bagan SG, Chennaiyin, Kerala Blasters, Mohammedan and Inter Kashi were rejected.
- On 23 May 2026, the Genius Sports bid for the league's commercial rights could not be approved at a Special General Meeting in Kolkata after several clubs sought greater clarity on the associated revenue-sharing model.
- Following the meeting, the AIFF set 15 June 2026 as the deadline for clubs to confirm participation for the 2026–27 season with a ₹1 crore (US$110,000) fee. The federation also outlined plans to begin the 2026–27 season with the Durand Cup in July before starting a 14-team double round-robin league by early September. The clubs presented a counter-proposal promising to generate approximately ₹60 crore (US$6.4 million) annually to operate the league and cup competitions while matching most of the commitments made by Genius Sports, which had offered ₹67 crore (US$7.2 million) annually for 15+5 years.

=== June ===
- By early June 2026, with the calendar still unresolved, more than 150 ISL players were out of contract, several of them internationals, and most clubs had not opened renewal talks. Óscar Bruzón left East Bengal shortly after guiding the club to its first national league title in 22 years, while Goa and East Bengal, both due to appear in AFC competitions, were unable to begin preparations.
- In early June 2026, following meetings between club owners in Mumbai, the clubs emailed AIFF deputy secretary general M. Satyanarayan a revised proposal for a two-year club-led pilot model under which the federation would receive ₹15 crore (US$1.6 million) annually for the league's commercial rights.
- The proposal exceeded the approximately ₹12.4 crore (US$1.3 million) that Genius Sports had committed as administrative fees for the 2026–27 season. Writing on behalf of the clubs, FC Goa chief executive Ravi Puskur argued that prevailing market conditions undervalued the league and that none of the clubs would pay the proposed ₹1 crore (US$110,000) participation fee under a Genius Sports-led commercial model.
- On 8 June 2026, Union Sports Minister Mansukh Mandaviya met AIFF officials, club representatives and former AIFF president Praful Patel at the Sports Authority of India office in New Delhi. He assured the clubs that the 2026–27 season would proceed as scheduled and asked both sides to establish a task force to prepare a structured roadmap for the league.
- The meeting resulted in a four-year club-led proposal under which each of the 14 clubs would contribute ₹1.1 crore (US$120,000) annually, generating ₹15.4 crore (US$1.6 million) in administration fees for the AIFF. On 9 June, the federation announced that it had agreed to the proposal in principle, with the season expected to begin on 4 September while the Durand Cup would run from 25 June to 25 July.
- On 20 June 2026, an AIFF Special General Meeting approved a proposal permitting clubs in the ISL and the Indian Football League (IFL) to field a starting eleven containing three foreign players and one player holding Overseas Citizenship of India (OCI). At least 12 of the 14 clubs opposed the measure, while Mohun Bagan SG later submitted recommendations including making OCI selection optional and limiting registrations.

=== July ===
- On 2 July 2026, after accepting the clubs' proposal in principle, the AIFF sought clarification on three provisions before formally transferring the league's commercial rights: audit rights over the ISL special purpose vehicle, a 10% share of the league's net profits, and the clubs' right to terminate the agreement after two years.
- The AIFF instead proposed a renegotiation mechanism after two seasons, with any termination requiring sufficient notice to allow alternative arrangements for the league's continued operation.
- On 8 July 2026, the AIFF and the ISL Managing Committee formally signed a four-year club-led agreement after resolving outstanding issues relating to independent auditing, profit-sharing and the termination clause.
- Under the agreement, clubs would hold the league's commercial rights through a special purpose vehicle while the AIFF retained regulatory control. Participation fees were fixed at ₹1.1 crore (US$120,000), ₹1.15 crore (US$120,000), ₹1.2 crore (US$130,000) and ₹1.25 crore (US$130,000) over four seasons, with promotion and relegation continuing and the league reverting to a full home-and-away format.
- In mid-July 2026, Satyanarayan wrote to all 14 clubs requiring written confirmation of participation together with the first instalment of ₹55 lakh (US$59,000) by 20 July, with the second ₹55 lakh (US$59,000) due before 14 August.
- By the 20 July 2026 deadline, 12 of the 14 clubs had completed the first instalment, with Jamshedpur and Inter Kashi the only two outstanding; both had written to the AIFF seeking an extension on operational grounds. The first instalments of East Bengal, Mohun Bagan SG and Diamond Harbour were adjusted against prize money owed to them from the previous season.
- On 25 July 2026, the AIFF, together with the clubs, released a Request for Proposal (RFP) for the media rights of the season under the new club-led commercial model. The RFP offered two packages: Package A combined media rights with live production responsibilities, while Package B offered media rights without production, with the clubs responsible for arranging live production.
- On 31 July 2026, the league signed a new four-year agreement with Swiss sports technology company Sportradar to remain the league's official Data and Integrity Partner until the end of the 2029–30 season. The agreement was valued at ₹57 crore (US$6.1 million), equivalent to ₹15 crore (US$1.6 million) per season, representing an increase of approximately 21% over the previous full-season agreement for the 2024–25 season.
- On 31 July 2026, Jamshedpur announced that it would not participate in the 2026–27 season, ending its nine-year association with the competition after being a member since the 2017–18 season. The club had failed to pay the ₹55 lakh (US$59,000) participation fee by the extended deadline after previously seeking additional time to complete internal shareholder approval procedures. Inter Kashi paid its instalment on the same day. The withdrawal reduced the number of participating clubs from 14 to 13 for the 2026–27 season.

=== August ===
- On 13 August 2026, the Indian Super League secured a new two-year agreement with Nivia Sports, which retained its position as the league's official ball and equipment partner from the 2026–27 season. Nivia will supply official match balls to the league and its participating clubs, as well as referee kits and apparel for the league's central team.
- On 14 August 2026, Tata Steel agreed to transfer its entire equity stake in Jamshedpur Football and Sporting Private Limited (JFSPL) to Churchill Brothers for a token consideration of ₹100 (US$1.10). The agreement included the transfer of Jamshedpur FC's league sporting licence and the contracts of 12 players and two coaches. Churchill Brothers agreed to take over the contracts of players and coaching staff from September 2026, subject to AIFF approval and other applicable conditions.
- On 14 August 2026, 13 of the 14 participating clubs completed the second instalment of the ISL participation fee for the 2026–27 season. Churchill Brothers, following its agreement to acquire Jamshedpur FC's sporting licence and the ownership of JFSPL, also completed the full participation fee payment. Diamond Harbour were the only club yet to make the second payment.
- On 18 August 2026, Diamond Harbour sought additional time from the AIFF to clear its outstanding final instalment of the ISL participation fee and confirm its participation in the 2026–27 season. The AIFF had set 14 August as the deadline for clubs to complete the ₹1.1 crore (US$120,000) participation fee in two instalments of ₹55 lakh (US$59,000) each.
- On 19 August 2026, the AIFF, on behalf of the federation and the participating clubs, confirmed that the season would proceed with 13 clubs after Diamond Habour failed to complete its outstanding participation-fee payment by the extended deadline. The season will be played in a double round-robin format on a home-and-away basis.
- On 19 August 2026, the clubs opened direct discussions with Zee and Sony Sports over the league's media rights for the upcoming four-season cycle after the tender attracted only one bid. Google also held discussions with the clubs regarding potential support for making the matches available live on YouTube.
- On 22 August 2026, the AIFF was reported to be considering a one-season suspension of relegation from the league following the reduction in participating clubs from 14 to 13, subject to approval from the league governing council and the executive committee. Diamond Harbour FC's failure to complete its participation-fee payment left the league with 13 teams, while Mohammedan had already been relegated after finishing bottom of the previous season.

=== September ===
- On 2 September 2026, the AIFF informed the clubs that relegation would continue to apply at the conclusion of the 2026–27 season despite the reduction in participating clubs from 14 to 13. Diamond Harbour FC, which had won the IFL in 2025–26 and earned promotion to the ISL, did not take up its promoted slot. The AIFF therefore ruled that they would be deemed to finish at the bottom of the table, would not be eligible to earn points during the season, and would not retain ISL status for 2027–28, meaning the club would compete in the IFL in that season.
- The AIFF also confirmed the return of the Indian Super League playoff system, with six teams competing for the league championship.
- On 29 September 2026, the UAE-based sports consortium Al Fursan Group signed a definitive agreement to acquire 100% of Kerala Blasters FC from Magnum Sports. The ownership transfer is to be completed in phases over eight months, subject to regulatory and league requirements. The transaction was reportedly valued at around ₹120 crore (US$13 million). Ofioh Sports is to serve as the club's operational partner under the new ownership.
- On 30 September 2026, MG Motor agreed to become the title sponsor of the ISL for two seasons in a deal worth more than ₹25 crore (US$2.7 million), with the competition to be renamed the MG Indian Super League. MG cars were also to be awarded to the league's best players at the end of the season. The ISL had been without a title sponsor since Hero MotoCorp ended its association with the competition after the 2022–23 season.

=== October ===
- On 1 October 2026, the ISL was reported to have reached an agreement with Sony Sports and Google over the league's media rights for the next two seasons. Sony Sports acquired the satellite television rights for the Indian subcontinent and stream matches on SonyLIV in India, while Google will stream every match on YouTube in India and worldwide. The arrangement would also reportedly give ISL clubs access to broadcast and streaming data, including overall and state-wise reach, for the first time. Pre-match, half-time and post-match analysis returns to the ISL after three seasons. With regional feeds tied to the teams in action, Malayalam commentary will be on for Kerala Blasters matches, Tamil for Chennaiyin FC and Bengali for Mohun Bagan SG and East Bengal.

== Changes from last season ==
- After losing AFC Champions League Two slots owing to India's drop to 15th in the West Zone of the AFC rankings, this is the first season to feature the champion or the best eligible club earning a slot for the AFC Challenge League preliminary round, the Asian third-tier continental competition.
- The ISL Cup playoffs make a comback after being absent from the 2025–26 Indian Super League.

== Teams ==
13 teams from 11 cities are competing in the 13th season of Indian Super League.

#	Team	Path	Notes
Entered ISL
1	Churchill Brothers	Ownership transfer ▲	License transferred from Jamshedpur
Exited ISL
1	Mohammedan	Relegated to 2026–27 IFL ▼	
2	Jamshedpur	Withdrew	License transferred to Churchill Brothers
3	Diamond Harbour	Barred from participation and relegated to 2027–28 IFL ▼	The 2025–26 IFL Champions failed to pay the outstanding participation fee and will be relegated to the 2027–28 IFL without playing a game

=== Stadiums and locations ===
Locations of Indian Super League teams

Team	Location	Stadium	Capacity
Bengaluru	Bengaluru	Sree Kanteerava Stadium	25,810
Chennaiyin	Chennai	Marina Arena	40,000
Churchill Brothers	Margao	Fatorda Stadium	19,000
Delhi	New Delhi	Jawaharlal Nehru Stadium	60,254
East Bengal	Kolkata	Vivekananda Yuba Bharati Krirangan	68,000
Goa (Note: The club moved to GMC Athletic Stadium, Bambolim for the second half of the season.)	Margao	Fatorda Stadium	19,000
Goa	Panaji	GMC Athletic Stadium	3,000
Inter Kashi (Note: The club is based in Varanasi, Uttar Pradesh, but will play its home games in Shree Shiv Chhatrapati Sports Complex in Pune due to ongoing construction on their own stadium getting built in Varanasi, Uttar Pradesh.)	Varanasi	Shree Shiv Chhatrapati Sports Complex	11,900
Kerala Blasters	Kochi	Kaloor Stadium	40,000
Mohun Bagan SG	Kolkata	Vivekananda Yuba Bharati Krirangan	68,000
Mumbai City	Mumbai	Mumbai Football Arena	7,000
NorthEast United	Guwahati	Sarusajai Stadium	21,600
NorthEast United	Imphal	Khuman Lampak Stadium	29,877
Odisha	Bhubaneswar	Kalinga Stadium	15,000
Punjab (Note: The club is based in Mohali, Punjab, but played its home games in New Delhi.)	Mohali	Jawaharlal Nehru Stadium	60,254
~~Diamond Harbour~~	~~Diamond Harbour~~	~~Kishore Bharati Krirangan~~	~~12,000~~

== Personnel and kits ==
Team	Head coach	Captain	Kit manufacturer	Kit sponsors	
Team	Head coach	Captain	Kit manufacturer	Main	Other(s)
Bengaluru	(Spain) Pep Muñoz	(India) Sunil Chhetri	Puma	JSW	List: Front: White Gold; Back: Century Real Estate; Sleeves: BGauss, Flamingo Health, Ditto Insurance; Shorts: None
Chennaiyin	(India) Clifford Miranda	(India) Mohammad Nawaz	Six5Six	None	List: Front: SSVM Institutions, ISGL.in; Back: None; Sleeves: Zebronics; Shorts: None
Churchill Brothers	(Cyprus) Dimitris Dimitriou	(India) Kingslee Fernandes	Nivia	None	List: Front: None; Back: None; Sleeves: Accompany; Shorts: None
Delhi	(Poland) Tomasz Tchórz	(India) Lamgoulen Hangshing	Six5Six	None	List: Front: GD Goenka Group; Back: None; Sleeves: Omega Seiki Mobility; Shorts: None
East Bengal	(Spain) Antonio López Habas	(Palestine) Mohammed Rashid	Trak Only	None	List: Front: Emami; Back: Kingfisher; Sleeves: None; Shorts: None
Goa	(Spain) Ángel Viadero	(India) Sandesh Jhingan	Trak Only	None	List: Front: None; Back: None; Sleeves: None; Shorts: None
Inter Kashi	(Portugal) Carlos Vaz Pinto	(India) Sumeet Passi	Ambition Sports	ISGL.in	List: Front: None; Back: None; Sleeves: None; Shorts: None
Kerala Blasters	(England) Ashley Westwood	(India) Vibin Mohanan	Six5Six	None	List: Front: AVT Premium; Back: None; Sleeves: Suryadev TMT Rebar; Shorts: None
Mohun Bagan SG	(Greece) Panagiotis Dilmperis	(India) Subhasish Bose	Skechers	CESC	List: Front: SRMB TMT, Freemans; Back: Arun Icecreams; Sleeves: CESC; Shorts: Kingfisher
Mumbai City	(England) Ashvir Singh Johal	(India) Akash Mishra	Puma	None	List: Front: Matix; Back: ISGL.in; Sleeves: None; Shorts: EA Sports FC
NorthEast United	(Spain) Juan Pedro Benali	(Morocco) Alaaeddine Ajaraie	Reebok	Meghalaya Tourism	List: Front: IndianOil; Back: Swoofi, Coal India Limited; Sleeves: OPUL, Indian Superbike League, Hubtown; Shorts: JA Racing
Odisha	(India) TG Purushothaman	(India) Puitea	Kaidos Sports	Odisha Tourism	List: Front: GMS Leadership, Lila Global; Back: RFK Shipping; Sleeves: Hi-Tech Medical College and Hospital, Fast&Up; Shorts: None
Punjab	(Greece) Pavlos Dermitzakis	(India) Nikhil Prabhu	Shiv Naresh	Roundglass Living	List: Front: None; Back: Roundglass; Sleeves: None; Shorts: JioSaavn

== Coaching changes ==
Team	Outgoing coach	Manner of departure	Date of vacancy	Position	Incoming coach	Date of appointment
East Bengal	(Spain) Óscar Bruzón	Contract expired	4 May 2026	Pre-season	(Spain) Antonio López Habas	7 July 2026
Goa	(Spain) Manolo Márquez	Signed by Mumbai City	19 June 2026	Pre-season	(India) Gouramangi Singh	24 July 2026
Mohun Bagan SG	(Spain) Sergio Lobera	Contract expired	16 June 2026	Pre-season	(Greece) Panagiotis Dilmperis	7 July 2026
Mumbai City	(Czech Republic) Petr Kratky	Contract expired	10 June 2026	Pre-season	(Spain) Manolo Márquez	18 July 2026
Punjab	(Greece) Panagiotis Dilmperis	Signed by Mohun Bagan SG	7 July 2026	Pre-season	(Greece) Pavlos Dermitzakis	18 July 2026
Churchill Brothers	—N/a	—N/a	—N/a	Pre-season	(Cyprus) Dimitris Dimitriou	18 July 2026
Inter Kashi	(India) Abhijit Mondal	End of interim period	7 October 2026	Pre-season	(Portugal) Carlos Vaz Pinto	7 October 2026
Mumbai City	(Spain) Manolo Márquez	Resigned	6 November 2026	11th	(England) Ashvir Singh Johal	14 November 2026
Goa	(India) Gouramangi Singh	Mutual consent	13 November 2026	7th	(Spain) Ángel Viadero	15 November 2026

== Foreign players ==
The AIFF allows teams to register a maximum of six foreign players. A maximum of four can be fielded in a match at a time.

Team	Player 1	Player 2	Player 3	Player 4	Player 5	Player 6	Unregistered player(s)	Former player(s)
Bengaluru	(Argentina) Manuel de Iriondo	(Montenegro) Mihailo Perović	(Netherlands) Menno Koch	(Portugal) Sandro Sakho	(Spain) Borja Martínez			
Chennaiyin	(Brazil) Ramon Tanque	(France) Madih Talal	(Portugal) Nuno Reis	(Rwanda) Emmanuel Imanishimwe	(Serbia) Nikola Stojanović			
Churchill Brothers	(Burkina Faso) Dramane Salou	(Colombia) Sebastián Gutiérrez	(Ivory Coast) Alexandre Yeoulé	(Nigeria) John Okoli	(Nigeria) Joseph Okoro	(South Africa) Wayde Lekay	(Serbia) Bogdan Mandic	
Delhi	(Brazil) Rodriguinho	(Burundi) David Richard Ndayishimiye	(Cape Verde) Carlos Fortes	(Colombia) Duván Viáfara	(Colombia) Juan Peña	(Nigeria) Nduka Junior		
East Bengal	(Australia) Chris Ikonomidis	(Croatia) Diego Živulić	(Ivory Coast) Aké Loba	(Palestine) Mohammed Rashid	(Poland) Łukasz Zwoliński	(Spain) Dani Ramírez	(Nigeria) Effiong Nsungusi (Spain) Nacho Monsalve	
Goa	(Argentina) Franchu	(Spain) Álex Vallejo	(Spain) Álex Zalaya	(Spain) Chiki	(Spain) Jorge Ortiz			
Inter Kashi								
Kerala Blasters	(England) Andre Green	(England) James Bolton	(Guinea) Momo Yansané	(Montenegro) Nebojša Kosović	(Senegal) Fallou Ndiaye	(Uruguay) Adrián Luna		
Mohun Bagan SG	(Australia) Jamie Maclaren	(Bosnia and Herzegovina) Samir Zeljković	(Brazil) Miguel Figueira	(Scotland) Lee Erwin	(Serbia) Dejan Dražić	(Spain) Alberto Rodríguez		
Mumbai City	(Brazil) Hadrian dos Santos	(Colombia) Wilmar Jordán	(Serbia) Lazar Ćirković	(Slovenia) Luka Majcen	(Spain) Carlos Delgado	(Spain) Sergio Llamas	(Uruguay) Leandro Otormín	
NorthEast United	(Morocco) Alaaeddine Ajaraie	(Serbia) Nikola Ninković	(Spain) Antonio Moyano	(Spain) Eneko Satrústegui	(Spain) Ethyan González			
Odisha	(Brazil) Everton	(Georgia (country)) Giorgi Aburjania	(Nigeria) Stephen Eze	(Palestine) Mahmoud Eid	(Spain) Manu Molina			
Punjab	(Brazil) Diego Raposo	(Cameroon) Patrick Bahanack	(Cameroon) Raphaël Messi Bouli	(Martinique) Mickaël Malsa	(Spain) Alfred Planas			

=== Foreign players by confederation ===
Foreign players by confederation
UEFA (32)	Spain (14), Serbia (4), England (2), Montenegro (2), Portugal (2), Bosnia and Herzegovina (1), Croatia (1), France (1), Georgia (1), Netherlands (1), Poland (1), Scotland (1), Slovenia (1)
CAF (16)	Nigeria (4), Cameroon (2), Ivory Coast (2), Burkina Faso (1), Burundi (1), Cape Verde (1), Guinea (1), Morocco (1), Rwanda (1), South Africa (1), Senegal (1)
CONMEBOL (13)	Brazil (5), Colombia (4), Argentina (2), Uruguay (2)
AFC (4)	Australia (2), Palestine (2)
CONCACAF (1)	Martinique (1)
Total foreign players: 67 (3 unregistered)

== Regular season ==
=== League table ===
Pos	Team	Pld	W	D	L	GF	GA	GD	Pts	Qualification
1	Mohun Bagan (Note: If Mohun Bagan SG, who are banned from AFC competitions until 2028–29 season. If they become Indian Super League champions, the ISL league runners-up will qualify for Challenge League preliminary stage.)	6	5	0	1	10	6	+4	15	League Shield Winners and qualification for the Challenge League preliminary stage and semi-finals
2	Bengaluru	5	4	1	0	10	4	+6	13	Qualification for the SAFF Club Championship and semi-finals
3	NorthEast United	6	3	2	1	8	3	+5	11	Qualification for the knockouts
4	Delhi	6	2	2	2	12	10	+2	8	Qualification for the knockouts
5	Punjab	5	2	2	1	8	7	+1	8	Qualification for the knockouts
6	Goa	5	2	2	1	6	5	+1	8	Qualification for the knockouts
7	East Bengal	4	2	1	1	14	8	+6	7	
8	Chennaiyin	6	1	3	2	7	8	−1	6	
9	Kerala Blasters	4	1	2	1	3	4	−1	5	
10	Churchill Brothers	5	1	0	4	5	12	−7	3	
11	Odisha	4	0	2	2	4	6	−2	2	
12	Mumbai City	5	0	2	3	4	8	−4	2	
13	Inter Kashi	5	0	1	4	3	13	−10	1	
14	Diamond Harbour (R)	0	0	0	0	0	0	0	0	Barred and relegated to 2027–28 IFL

Updated to match(es) played on 21 November 2026. Source: Indian Super League
Rules for classification: 1) points; 2) goal difference; 3) number of goals scored; 4) head-to-head points; 5) head-to-head goal difference; 6) head-to-head goals scored; 7) fair play ranking; 8) drawing of lots
(Note: Head-to-head record is used only after all the matches between the teams in question have been played).
(R) Relegated

== Results ==
=== Match by match ===
Home \ Away	BEN	CHE	CBG	DEL	EAB	GOA	INK	KEB	MBG	MCI	NEU	ODI	PUN
Bengaluru		2–0		3–2						2–0			
Chennaiyin					5–3			0–0					1–1
Churchill Brothers					0–4				1–2	2–1	0–2		2–3
Delhi									1–2				
East Bengal				2–2									
Goa	1–2	1–1		1–1									
Inter Kashi				0–3	1–5	1–2		0–2				1–1	
Kerala Blasters										0–0			
Mohun Bagan SG		1–0										3–2	2–1
Mumbai City				2–3									
NorthEast United	1–1					0–1		4–1	1–0				
Odisha											0–0		
Punjab										1–1		2–1	

Updated to match(es) played on 20 November 2026. Source: ISL Fixtures
Legend: Blue = home team win; Yellow = draw; Red = away team win.

=== Form ===
Team ╲ Round	1	2	3	4	5	6	7	8	9	10	11	12	13	14	15	16	17	18	19	20	21	22	23	24	25	26
Bengaluru	W	W	×	D	W	W	×																			
Chennaiyin	D	L	L	D	W	D					×	×														
Churchill Brothers	W	L	L	×	L	L				×		×			×											×
Delhi	L	L	D	W	W		×	×				×				×						×				
East Bengal	×	W	W	×	L	D																		×		
Goa	D	×	D	W	L	W				×		×			×	×							×			
Inter Kashi	L	D	L	L	L	×						×								×			×			
Kerala Blasters	W	L	D	D	×	×										×			×							
Mohun Bagan SG	L	W	W	W	W	W						×		×												
Mumbai City	L	D	D	L	×	L						×									×					
NorthEast United	W	W	D	D	W					×		×	×			×										
Odisha	L	D	D	×	L	×	×								×											
Punjab	W	D	W	L	×	D			×			×				×		×								

Updated to match(es) played on 21 November 2026. Source: ISL
W = Win; D = Draw; L = Lose; × = No match scheduled in the round

=== Position by Gameweek ===
Team ╲ Round	1	2	3	4	5	6	7	8	9	10	11	12	13	14	15	16	17	18	19	20	21	22	23	24
Bengaluru	2	2	4^{*}	3	3																			
Chennaiyin	6	11	12	12	8	8																		
Churchill Brothers	3	7	7	9	10	10																		
Delhi	9	13	11	8	4																			
East Bengal	8^{*}	4	3	5^{*}	6	7																		
Goa	7	8^{*}	8	6	7																			
Inter Kashi	13	12	13	13	13	13^{*}																		
Kerala Blasters	1	6	6	7	9^{*}	9																		
Mohun Bagan SG	12	5	5	1	1	1																		
Mumbai City	10	9	9	11	11^{*}	12																		
NorthEast United	5	1	1	2	2																			
Odisha	11	10	10	10	12	11^{*}																		
Punjab	4	3	2	4	5^{*}																			

Updated to match(es) played on 21 November 2026. Source: Indian Super League
= Champions/Challenge League Preliminary stage/Knockout; = SAFF Club Championship/Knockout; = Knockout
Notes: * indicates a team that did not play during the gameweek; # indicates a team that did play multiple matches during the gameweek

== Season statistics ==
As of 21 November 2026

=== Top scorers ===
Rank	Player	Team	Goals
1	(Spain) Borja Martínez	Bengaluru	4
1	(Cameroon) Raphaël Messi Bouli	Punjab	4
1	(Ivory Coast) Aké Arnaud Loba	East Bengal	4
4	(Spain) Dani Ramírez	East Bengal	3
4	(Colombia) Sebastián Gutiérrez	Churchill Brothers	3
4	(Scotland) Dejan Dražić	Mohun Bagan SG	3
4	(Serbia) Lee Erwin	Mohun Bagan SG	3
4	(Colombia) Juan Peña	Delhi	3
4	(Cape Verde) Carlos Fortes	Delhi	3
4	Irfan Yadwad	Chennaiyin	3

=== Top assists ===
Rank	Player	Team	Assists
1	(Spain) Dani Ramírez	East Bengal	3
2	(Ivory Coast) Aké Arnaud Loba	East Bengal	2
2	Konsam Sanathoi Singh	Punjab	2
2	Noufal P. N.	Mumbai City	2
2	Lallianzuala Chhangte	Mohun Bagan SG	2
2	Muhammed Nemil	Goa	2
2	(Brazil) Rodriguinho	Delhi	2
2	Manoj Mohammed	Delhi	2
9	Lalrinliana Hnamte	Delhi	1
9	Ashutosh Mehta	Delhi	1
9	(Burundi) David Richard Ndayishimiye	Delhi	1
9	David Lalhlansanga	East Bengal	1
9	Vishnu P. V.	East Bengal	1
9	Bipin Singh Thounaojam	East Bengal	1
9	(Australia) Chris Ikonomidis	East Bengal	1
9	Rohit Kumar	East Bengal	1
9	Ryan Williams	Bengaluru	1
9	(Montenegro) Mihailo Perović	Bengaluru	1
9	Soham Varshneya	Bengaluru	1
9	(Spain) Borja Martínez	Bengaluru	1
9	Sunil Chhetri	Bengaluru	1
9	Lalremtluanga Fanai	Bengaluru	1
9	Ashique Kuruniyan	Bengaluru	1
9	Monirul Molla	Bengaluru	1
9	Namgyal Bhutia	Chennaiyin	1
9	Irfan Yadwad	Chennaiyin	1
9	(France) Madih Talal	Chennaiyin	1
9	Lalhriatpuia Chawngthu	Chennaiyin	1
9	(Brazil) Ramon Tanque	Chennaiyin	1
9	Aakash Sangwan	Goa	1
9	Tomba Singh Haobam	Goa	1
9	Isak Vanlalruatfela	Goa	1
9	Korou Singh Thingujam	Kerala Blasters	1
9	Mohammed Sanan	Kerala Blasters	1
9	(Uruguay) Adrián Luna	Kerala Blasters	1
9	Stendly Fernandes	Churchill Brothers	1
9	Vincy Barretto	Churchill Brothers	1
9	Muhammad Uvais	Punjab	1
9	Bishu Sharma	Punjab	1
9	(Cameroon) Raphaël Messi Bouli	Punjab	1
9	Puitea	Odisha	1
9	Nihal Sudeesh	Odisha	1
9	Rahul Bheke	Mohun Bagan SG	1
9	Apuia	Mohun Bagan SG	1
9	Liston Colaço	Mohun Bagan SG	1
9	Anirudh Thapa	Mohun Bagan SG	1
9	(Scotland) Lee Erwin	Mohun Bagan SG	1
9	(Spain) Eneko Satrústegui	NorthEast United	1
9	(Morocco) Alaaeddine Ajaraie	NorthEast United	1
9	(Spain) Antonio Moyano	NorthEast United	1
9	Macarton Nickson	NorthEast United	1
9	(Spain) Ethyan González	NorthEast United	1
9	Jithin M. S.	NorthEast United	1
9	Abdul Rabeeh	NorthEast United	1
9	Rosenberg Gabriel	Inter Kashi	1

=== Clean sheets ===
Rank	Player	Team	Clean sheets
1	Gurmeet Singh Chahal	NorthEast United	3
2	Gurpreet Singh Sandhu	Bengaluru	2
2	Amrinder Singh	Kerala Blasters	2
4	Arsh Anwer Shaikh	Kerala Blasters	1
4	Prabhsukhan Singh Gill	East Bengal	1
4	Hrithik Tiwari	Odisha	1
4	Rehenesh T. P.	Mumbai City	1
4	Vishal Kaith	Mohun Bagan SG	1
4	Mohammad Nawaz	Chennaiyin	1
4	Nora Fernandes	Delhi	1
4	Bob Jackson	Goa	1

=== Discipline ===
==== Player ====
- Most yellow cards: 4
  - Raphaël Messi Bouli (Punjab)
- Most red cards: 1
  - Emmanuel Imanishimwe (Chennaiyin)
  - Andre Green (Kerala Blasters)

==== Club ====
- Most yellow cards: 16
  - NorthEast United
- Most red cards: 1
  - Chennaiyin
  - Kerala Blasters

== Awards ==
=== Match awards ===
Player of the Match
Match	Player of the Match		Match	Player of the Match		Match	Player of the Match		Match	Player of the Match	
Match	Player	Club	Match	Player	Club	Match	Player	Club	Match	Player	Club
1	(Spain) Chiki	Goa	40			79			118		
2	(Spain) Borja Martínez	Bengaluru	41			80			119		
3	(India) Gaurav Bora	Churchill Brothers	42			81			120		
4	(India) Vibin Mohanan	Kerala Blasters	43			82			121		
5	(India) Jithin M. S.	NorthEast United	44			83			122		
6	(Cameroon) Messi Bouli	Punjab	45			84			123		
7	(Brazil) Miguel Figueira	Mohun Bagan	46			85			124		
8	(India) Huidrom Thoi Singh	Inter Kashi	47			86			125		
9	(Spain) Borja Martínez (2)	Bengaluru	48			87			126		
10	(Morocco) Alaaeddine Ajaraie	NorthEast United	49			88			127		
11z	(India) Edmund Lalrindika	East Bengal	50			89			128		
12	(Serbia) Lazar Ćirković	Mumbai City	51			90			129		
13	(Spain) Dani Ramírez	East Bengal	52			91			130		
14	(India) Jeremy Zohminghlua	Odisha	53			92			131		
15	(India) Amrinder Singh	Kerala Blasters	54			93			132		
16	(India) Konsam Sanathoi Singh	Punjab	55			94			133		
17	(France) Madih Talal	Chennaiyin	56			95			134		
18	(India) Mohammed Azhar	Delhi	57			96			135		
19	(India) Jithin M. S. (2)	NorthEast United	58			97			136		
20	(Serbia) Nikola Stojanović	Chennaiyin	59			98			137		
21	(Scotland) Lee Erwin	Mohun Bagan	60			99			138		
22	(Colombia) Juan Peña	Delhi	61			100			139		
23	(Argentina) Franchu	Goa	62			101			140		
24	(India) Pramveer Singh	NorthEast United	63			102			141		
25	(Serbia) Dejan Dražić	Mohun Bagan	64			103			142		
26	(India) Ricky Meetei	Bengaluru	65			104			143		
27	(Colombia) Juan Peña (2)	Delhi	66			105			144		
28	(India) Irfan Yadwad	Chennaiyin	67			106			145		
29	(India) Ashutosh Mehta	Delhi	68			107			146		
30	(Portugal) Sandro Sakho	Bengaluru	69			108			147		
31	(Cameroon) Messi Bouli (2)	Punjab	70			109			148		
32	(India) Sandesh Jhingan	Goa	71			110			149		
33			72			111			150		
34			73			112			151		
35			74			113			152		
36			75			114			153		
37			76			115			154		
38			77			116			155		
39			78			117			156		

== ISL Cup playoffs ==
The ISL Cup Play-offs is a knockout tournament held after the regular league season.

- Format:
  - Top six teams from the league qualify for the playoffs.
  - The top two teams advance directly to the two-legged semi-finals.
  - Teams ranked 3rd to 6th play a single-legged knockout round, hosted by the higher-ranked team.
- Progression:
  - Winners of the knockout stage join the top two teams in the semi-finals.
  - Semi-finals are played over two legs to determine the finalists.
  - The tournament culminates in a single-leg final hosted by the higher-ranked league side to crown the ISL Cup winner.

=== Bracket ===
Knockout
4
5
3
6

Semifinals
1
4/5
2
3/6

Finals
1/4/5
2/3/6

=== Knockout ===
Team 1	Score	Team 2
3rd Place	–	6th Place
4th Place	–	5th Place

=== Semi-finals ===
Team 1	Agg.	Team 2	1st leg	2nd leg
1st Place	–	KO	–	–
2nd Place	–	KO	–	–

== Attendance ==
=== Regular season ===
Pos	Team	Total	High	Low	Average	Change
1	Mohun Bagan	66,236	29,797	18,007	22,079	−20.8%
2	Bengaluru	20,834	17,796	10,211	12,877	−16.2%
3	East Bengal	4,251	4,251	4,251	4,251	−70.7%
4	Kerala Blasters	40,014	40,014	40,014	40,014	+408.2%
5	SC Delhi	14,791	14,791	14,791	14,791	+99.3%
6	NorthEast United	30,851	11,377	9,637	10,284	+148.1%
7	Chennaiyin	14,554	9,321	5,233	6,824	+86.5%
8	Mumbai City	4,522	4,522	4,522	4,522	+34.2%
9	FC Goa	10,779	4,531	3,001	3,593	+15.4%
10	Punjab	6,510	3,845	2,665	3,255	+6.4%
11	Inter Kashi	12,183	3,489	1,026	2,436	+17.1%
12	Odisha	5,341	5,341	5,341	5,341	+207.3%
13	Churchill Brothers	24,311	8,011	4,832	6,077	+284.9%
	League total	272,973	40,014	1,026	9,099	+5.4%

Source: ISL

=== By home matches ===
Team \ Home Game	1	2	3	4	5	6	7	8	9	10	11	12	Total
Bengaluru	10,623	10,211	17,796										38,631
Chennaiyin	9,321	5,233	5,919										20,473
Delhi	14,791												14,791
Churchill Brothers	6,359	8,011	5,109	4,832									24,311
East Bengal	4,251												4,251
Goa	4,531	3,247	3,001										10,779
Inter Kashi	3,459	1,847	2,362	3,489	1,026								12,183
Kerala Blasters	40,014												40,014
Mohun Bagan	18,432	18,007	29,797										66,236
Mumbai City	4,522												4,522
NorthEast United	9,637	9,837	11,377										30,851
Odisha	5,341												5,341
Punjab	2,665	3,845											6,510

Legend: Highest Lowest

== See also ==
- Men
  - 2026–27 IFL
  - 2026–27 I-League 2
  - 2026–27 I-League 3
  - 2026–27 Indian State Leagues
  - 2027 Federation Cup
  - 2026 Durand Cup
  - 2027 RFD League
- Women
  - 2026–27 IWL
  - 2026–27 IWL 2
