= 2025–26 I-League 3 =

3rd season of the I-League 3

I-League 3
- Season: 2025–26
- Dates: 27 April – 24 May 2026
- Champions: Banaras Baghpat (1st title)
- Promoted: Banaras Baghpat; Raengdai
- Relegated: 18 clubs
- Matches: 40
- Goals: 114 (2.85 per match)
- Top goalscorer: Ningombam Engson Singh (6 goals)
- Biggest win: New Friends 0–9 Banaras Baghpat (5 May 2026)
- Highest scoring: New Friends 0–9 Banaras Baghpat (5 May 2026)
- Longest unbeaten run: KLASA; Banaras Baghpat (7 matches)
- Longest losing run: Techtro Swades United (4 matches)

The 2025–26 I-League 3 was the 3rd season of the I-League 3 since its establishment in 2023 as the fourth tier of the Indian football league system.

== Club changes ==
The following clubs have changed division since the 2024–25 season:

#	Club	Path
Entered I-League 3
1	TRAU	Relegation from I-League 2 ▼
2	KLASA	Relegation from I-League 2 ▼
3–20	18 clubs	Nomination from State leagues ▲
Exited I-League 3
1	Morning Star	Promotion to I-League 2 ▲
2	MYJ–GMSC	Promotion to I-League 2 ▲
3	Kupuraj	Withdrew
4–21	19 clubs	Returned to State leagues ▼

== Clubs ==
Locations of 2025–26 I-League 3 group stage clubs
Group A
Group B
Group C
Group D

No.	Club	City	State	League	Position
1	TRAU	Imphal	Manipur	2024–25 I-League 2	8th
2	KLASA	Bishnupur	Manipur	2024–25 I-League 2	9th
3	Royal Rangers	Delhi	Delhi	2024–25 Delhi Premier League	3rd
4	BLG – The Diamond Rock	Balaghat	Madhya Pradesh	2024–25 Madhya Pradesh Premier League	2nd
5	Kuppuraj	Pondicherry	Pondicherry	2024 Pondicherry Men's League	1st (withdrew)
6	ARA	Ahmedabad	Gujarat	2024 Gujarat SFA Club Championship	1st
7	Sunrise	Cuttack	Odisha	2024 FAO League	1st
8	New Friends	Dantewada	Chhattisgarh	2024 Chhattisgarh State Men's Football League Championship	2nd
9	Zinc FA	Udaipur	Rajasthan	2024–25 R-League A Division	1st
10	Techtro Swades United	Una	Himachal Pradesh	2025 Himachal Football League	1st
11	Mawlai	Shillong	Meghalaya	2024 Meghalaya State League	1st
12	Agniputhra	Bengaluru	Karnataka	2024–25 BDFA Super Division	1st
13	Samaleswari	Sambalpur	Odisha	2025 FAO League	1st
14	Sikkim Brotherhood	Gangtok	Sikkim	2024 Sikkim Football League	2nd
15	Raengdai	Noney	Manipur	2024–25 Manipur Premier League	1st
16	Citadel Godavari Legends	Rajahmundry	Andhra Pradesh	2025 AP Super Cup	1st
17	CD Salgaocar	Vasco	Goa	2024–25 Goa Professional League	3rd
18	Mumbay	Mumbai	Maharashtra	2024–25 Maharashtra State Senior Men's Football League	1st
19	Chhaygaon	Chhaygaon	Assam	2024–25 Assam State Premier League	1st
20	Banaras Baghpat	Baghpat	Uttar Pradesh	2025 Uttar Pradesh Football Sangh League	1st

== Venues ==
Stage	Group	City	Stadium	Capacity
Group stage	A	Imphal	Khuman Lampak Main Stadium	38,285
Group stage	B	Imphal	SAI Turf Ground	TBC
Group stage	C	Balaghat	Mulna Stadium	15,000
Group stage	D	Bengaluru	Padukone–Dravid CSE Arena 1	250
Final round	—	Imphal	Khuman Lampak Main Stadium	38,285
Final round	—	Imphal	SAI Turf Ground	TBC

== Personnel ==
Club	Head coach	Captain
Agniputhra	(India) Rajan Mani	(India) Ahmed Faiz Khan
ARA	(India) Salim Pathan	(India) Moinuddin
Banaras Baghpat	(India) Vivek Kumar	(India) Subham Chetry
Chhaygaon	(India) Akash Basu	(India) Stephan Kyrsian
CD Salgaocar	(India) Keenan Almeida	(India) Denil Rebello
Diamond Rock	(India) Raghu N. B.	(India) Mohit Gudi
Godavari Legends	(India) Shabbir Ali	(India) Tikkam Dharaneswar Reddy
KLASA	(India) Kamei Joy Rongmei	(India) Sanaton Singh Salam
Mawlai	(India) Herring Shangpliang	(India) Damanbhalang Chyne
Mumbay	(England) (Bulgaria) Georgi Kostadinov Raev	(India) Bikramjit Singh
New Friends	(India) Abhishek Malik	(India) Sanjay Vishwakarma
Raengdai	(India) Birbal Singh Kshetrimayum	(India) Kamei Pantiga
Royal Rangers	(India) Paritosh Sharma	(India) Karmanya Bansal
Samaleswari	(Nigeria) (India) Saheed Ramon	(India) Salman Kalliyath
Sikkim Brotherhood	(India) Gyaltshen Dorjee Moktan	(India) Narayan Chettri
Sunrise	(India) Niyaz Rehman Pullat	(India) Unise K.
Techtro Swades	(India) Akshay Sawant	(India) Abhishek Calvin
TRAU	(India) Saran Singh Thangjam	(India) Chingkheinganba Thiyam
Zinc FA	(India) Kiran Gopalakrishnan	(India) Naro Hari Shrestha

== Group stage ==
=== Group A ===
Pos	Team	Pld	W	D	L	GF	GA	GD	Pts	Qualification	SUN	RAE	MAW	ARA	SIK
1	Sunrise	4	3	0	1	10	5	+5	9	Advanced to Final round			3–1	2–3	4–1
2	Raengdai (H)	4	2	1	1	6	3	+3	7	Advanced to Final round	0–1			3–0	
3	Mawlai	4	1	2	1	6	6	0	5			1–1			3–1
4	ARA FC	4	1	1	2	6	9	−3	4				1–1		
5	Sikkim Brotherhood	4	1	0	3	6	11	−5	3			1–2		3–2	

Source: IFL
Rules for classification: 1) points; 2) head-to-head points; 3) goal difference; 4) goals scored; 5) goal difference vs. qualified club 6) toss of coin
(H) Hosts

=== Group B ===
Pos	Team	Pld	W	D	L	GF	GA	GD	Pts	Qualification	TRA	SAM	ZIN	SAL	MUM
1	TRAU (H)	4	3	1	0	7	3	+4	10	Advanced to Final round				2–0	2–2
2	Samaleswari	4	2	0	2	6	5	+1	6		0–1		1–3		
3	Zinc FA	4	1	2	1	7	6	+1	5		1–2				2–2
4	CD Salgaocar	4	1	1	2	2	4	−2	4			0–1	1–1		1–0
5	Mumbay	4	0	2	2	5	9	−4	2			1–4			

Source: IFL
Rules for classification: 1) points; 2) head-to-head points; 3) goal difference; 4) goals scored; 5) goal difference vs. qualified club 6) toss of coin
(H) Hosts

=== Group C ===
Pos	Team	Pld	W	D	L	GF	GA	GD	Pts	Qualification	KLA	CHA	DIA	GOD	KUP
1	KLASA	3	3	0	0	5	1	+4	9	Advanced to Final round					~~3 May~~
2	Chhaygaon	3	2	0	1	6	1	+5	6	Advanced to Final round	0–1		4–0		
3	Diamond Rock (H)	3	1	0	2	3	6	−3	3		1–2			2–0	
4	Godavari Legends	3	0	0	3	0	6	−6	0		0–2	0–2			~~29 Apr~~
5	Kuppuraj	0	0	0	0	0	0	0	0	Withdrew		~~27 Apr~~	~~5 May~~		

Source: IFL
Rules for classification: 1) points; 2) head-to-head points; 3) goal difference; 4) goals scored; 5) goal difference vs. qualified club 6) toss of coin
(H) Hosts

=== Group D ===
Pos	Team	Pld	W	D	L	GF	GA	GD	Pts	Qualification	BAG	AGN	NEW	ROY	TEC
1	Banaras Baghpat	4	3	1	0	15	3	+12	10	Advanced to Final round		0–0			3–1
2	Agniputhra (H)	4	2	1	1	5	2	+3	7				2–0		3–0
3	New Friends	4	2	0	2	5	12	−7	6		0–9			3–1	2–0
4	Royal Rangers	4	2	0	2	7	7	0	6		2–3	2–0			
5	Techtro Swades	4	0	0	4	2	10	−8	0					1–2	

Source: IFL
Rules for classification: 1) points; 2) head-to-head points; 3) goal difference; 4) goals scored; 5) goal difference vs. qualified club 6) toss of coin
(H) Hosts

== Ranking of second-placed clubs ==
Pos	Grp	Team	Pld	W	D	L	GF	GA	GD	Pts	Qualification
1	C	Chhaygaon	3	2	0	1	6	1	+5	6	Advanced to Final round
2	A	Raengdai	3	1	1	1	4	2	+2	4	Advanced to Final round
3	D	Agniputhra	3	1	1	1	2	2	0	4	
4	B	Samaleswari	3	1	0	2	2	3	−1	3	

Source: IFL
Rules for classification: 1) points; 2) goal difference; 3) goals scored
(Note: In groups with 5 teams, results of matches played with the last ranked teams are excluded)

== Final round ==
The top clubs from each group, and the two best second-placed, progress to the final round, conducted in a centralised single round-robin format. The top two clubs at the end of the final round earn promotion to the 2026–27 I-League 2.

Pos	Team	Pld	W	D	L	GF	GA	GD	Pts	Promotion	BAG	RAE	SUN	KLA	TRA	CHA
1	Banaras Baghpat (C, P)	5	3	1	1	8	4	+4	10	Promotion to I-League 2		3–1				4–2
2	Raengdai (P, H)	5	3	1	1	9	6	+3	10	Promotion to I-League 2					2–0	4–2
3	Sunrise	5	2	3	0	9	2	+7	9		1–0	1–1		0–0	0–0	
4	KLASA (H)	5	1	3	1	4	3	+1	6		0–0	0–1			1–1	
5	TRAU (H)	5	0	3	2	3	6	−3	3		0–1					2–2
6	Chhaygaon	5	0	1	4	8	20	−12	1				1–7	1–3		

Source: IFL
Legend: Blue = home team win; Yellow = draw; Red = away team win.
Rules for classification: 1) points; 2) head-to-head points; 3) head-to-head goal difference; 4) goal difference; 5) number of goals scored; 6) drawing of lots
(C) Champions; (H) Hosts; (P) Promoted

== Attendances ==
=== Group stage ===
Match No.	Group A		Match No.	Group B	
Match No.	Fixture	Attendance	Match No.	Fixture	Attendance
1	Raengdai–ARA FC	750	1	TRAU–Mumbay	250
2	Mawlai–Sikkim Brotherhood	150	2	Samaleswari–Zinc FA	100
3	Sunrise–Mawlai	100	3	CD Salgaocar–Samaleswari	100
4	Sikkim Brotherhood–ARA FC	200	4	Zinc FA–Mumbay	80
5	Sikkim Brotherhood–Raengdai	800	5	Zinc FA–TRAU	250
6	Sunrise–ARA FC	200	6	CD Salgaocar–Mumbay	40
7	ARA FC–Mawlai	150	7	Mumbay–Samaleswari	50
8	Raengdai–Sunrise	4,250	8	TRAU–CD Salgaocar	300
9	Sunrise–Sikkim Brotherhood	150	9	CD Salgaocar–Zinc FA	40
10	Mawlai–Raengdai	2,150	10	Samaleswari–TRAU	400
Group A Total		8,900	Group B Total		1,610
Match No.	Group C		Match No.	Group D	
Match No.	Fixture	Attendance	Match No.	Fixture	Attendance
1	Diamond Rock–Godavari Legends	150	1	Agniputhra–Techtro Swades	300
2	Chhaygaon–KLASA	150	2	Royal Rangers–Banaras Baghpat	350
3	KLASA–Diamond Rock	150	3	New Friends–Royal Rangers	275
4	Chhaygaon–Godavari Legends	150	4	Banaras Baghpat–Techtro Swades	150
5	KLASA–Godavari Legends	150	5	Banaras Baghpat–Agniputhra	275
6	Diamond Rock–Chhaygaon	150	6	New Friends–Techtro Swades	275
			7	Techtro Swades–Royal Rangers	100
			8	Agniputhra–New Friends	2,753
			9	New Friends–Banaras Baghpat	125
			10	Royal Rangers–Agniputhra	150
Group C Total		900	Group D Total		4,753

=== Playoffs ===
Match No.	Final Round	
Match No.	Fixture	Attendance
1	KLASA–Banaras Baghpat	250
2	Sunrise–TRAU	250
3	Raengdai–Chhaygaon	3,462
4	Chhaygaon–KLASA	285
5	Sunrise–Raengdai	1,548
6	TRAU–Banaras Baghpat	250
7	Chhaygaon–Sunrise	250
8	Banaras Baghpat–Raengdai	895
9	KLASA–TRAU	1,034
10	Sunrise–KLASA	1,000
11	Raengdai–TRAU	2,768
12	Banaras Baghpat–Chhaygaon	120
13	TRAU–Chhaygaon	126
14	KLASA–Raengdai	2,387
15	Sunrise–Banaras Baghpat	450
Final Round Total		15,069

Legend: Highest Lowest
Updated to game(s) played on 24 May 2026

== See also ==
- Men
  - 2025–26 Indian Super League (Tier I)
  - 2025–26 Indian Football League (Tier II)
  - 2025–26 I-League 2 (Tier III)
  - 2025–26 Indian State Leagues (Tier V)
  - 2025–26 AIFF Super Cup
  - 2025 Durand Cup
- Women
  - 2025–26 Indian Women's League (Tier I)
  - 2025–26 Indian Women's League 2 (Tier II)
