= Abdul Hannan (footballer) =

Indian footballer (born 2004)

Personal information
- Full name: Abdul Hannan
- Date of birth: 4 September 2004 (age 22)
- Place of birth: Punjab, India
- Height: 1.82 m (6 ft 0 in)
- Position: Centre-back

Team information
- Current team: Bengaluru United
- Number: 4

Youth career
- –2019: Sri Dashmesh Martial SA

Senior career*
Years	Team	Apps	(Gls)
2020–2022	Indian Arrows	14	(0)
2022–2024	Chennaiyin	0	(0)
2022–2023	Chennaiyin B	8	(0)
2024	Downtown Heroes	7	(0)
2025	SAT Tirur	15	(1)
2025–	Bengaluru United	11	(1)
- * Club domestic league appearances and goals as of 17 November 2026

Abdul Hannan (born 4 September 2004) is an Indian professional footballer who plays as a defender for Indian Football League club Bengaluru United.

== Career ==
=== Youth and Indian Arrows ===
Hannan began his football development at Sri Dashmesh Martial Sports Academy before joining the Indian Arrows, the developmental team operated by the All India Football Federation. He made his professional debut on 10 January 2021 in an I-League match against Churchill Brothers.

During his time with Indian Arrows, Hannan made 14 league appearances across the 2020–21 and 2021–22 I-League seasons.

=== Chennaiyin and subsequent clubs ===
In February 2023, Hannan moved from Indian Arrows to Chennaiyin FC. He also featured for Chennaiyin's reserve side, Chennaiyin B, in the I-League 2.

In August 2024, he joined Downtown Heroes, before moving to SAT Tirur in January 2025. He made appearances in the I-League 3 and I-League 2 competitions during the 2024–25 season.

=== FC Bengaluru United ===
On 1 July 2025, Hannan joined Bengaluru United from SAT Tirur on a free transfer. He featured for Bengaluru United in the 2025–26 I-League 2 season, making eight appearances as the club finished runners-up and secured promotion to the Indian Football League.

Hannan made his IFL club debut on 1 November 2026 against Dempo SC. He subsequently scored his first goal in the competition on 14 November 2026, heading in a 90th-minute equaliser against Real Kashmir in a 2–2 draw at the Bangalore Football Stadium. The goal was assisted by Lalramdinsanga Ralte.

== Career statistics ==
=== Club ===
As of 17 November 2026

Club	Season	League			National Cup		League Cup		AFC		Total	
Club	Season	Division	Apps	Goals	Apps	Goals	Apps	Goals	Apps	Goals	Apps	Goals
Indian Arrows	2020–21	I-League	9	0	—		—		—		9	0
Indian Arrows	2021–22	I-League	5	0	—		—		—		5	0
Indian Arrows	Total		14	0	0	0	0	0	0	0	14	0
Chennaiyin B	2022–23	I-League 2	4	0	—		—		—		4	0
Chennaiyin B	2024	RFDL	4	0	—		—		—		4	0
Chennaiyin B	Total		8	0	0	0	0	0	0	0	8	0
Downtown Heroes	2024–25	I-League 3	7	0	—		—		—		7	0
SAT Tirur	2024–25	I-League 2	15	1	—		—		—		15	1
Bengaluru United	2025–26	I-League 2	8	0	—		—		—		8	0
Bengaluru United	2026–27	Indian Football League	3	1	—		—		—		3	1
Bengaluru United	Total		11	1	0	0	0	0	0	0	11	1
Career total			55	2	0	0	0	0	0	0	55	2
