= SRMB Steel =

Steel manufacturer in Asia

SRMB Steel Pvt. Ltd.
- Company type: Private
- Industry: Building materials
- Headquarters: Kolkata, West Bengal, India
- Revenue: ▲₹1,554.54 crore (US$160 million) (2021)
- Net income: ▲₹75.08 crore (US$7.8 million) (2021)
- Website: www.srmbsteel.com

The SRMB Steel Pvt. Ltd. is one of the leading steel manufacturers in Asia. It was established in 1951 in Kolkata, India.It was founded by Radha Kishan Beriwala.

SRMB Group has been witnessing continuous growth with a turnover of over Rs.1500 crores in financial year 2020-21. In addition to a wide project base, the SRMB group has a pan India presence in retail market at present. The group has more than 700 distributors, dealers and C&F agents. With 19 working branches across India, SRMB Group has a list of clients which include DLF, Hindalco, Indian Railways, Larsen A& Toubro, NTPC, Reliance, Simplex, Shapoorji Paloonji, Unitech and Wipro.

== Overview ==
The SRMB group has been promoted by the late Radha Kishan Beriwala, the father of SRMB Group's chairman Shri Brij Mohan Beriwala. The SRMB Group, as the group is popularly known today, manufactures Fe:500&550 D TMT Bars which are seismic resistant. The group is the first to introduce "X" pattern Ribs on Fe 500, IS :1786 grade steel bars. Additionally, SRMB Group is one of the manufacturers who is a TEMPCORE Licensee from CRM Belgium, in India, with the grade certification of Fe 550 grade.

The Mumbai-Pune Expressway, Metro Railway projects in Kolkata and Mumbai, Vidyasagar Setu and Nivedita Setu in Kolkata, Haldia Petrochemicals, NPCIL Kudankulam and Kota are some important projects which have been undertaken by the SRMB Group.

== Sponsorships ==
=== Clubs ===
- ATK (2015–20)
- Mohun Bagan SG (2020–present)
- Kolkata Knight Riders (2016)

=== Players ===
- Kapil Dev
- Mahendra Singh Dhoni
- Rohit Sharma

== See also ==
- Steel companies of India
