= Hövsan =

- Municipality

- Location within Azerbaijan
- Coordinates: 40°22′28″N 50°05′07″E
- Country: Azerbaijan
- City: Baku
- Rayon: Surakhany

Population (2013)
  - Total: 85,000
- Time zone: UTC+4 (AZT)
  - Summer (DST): UTC+5 (AZT)
- Area code: +994 12

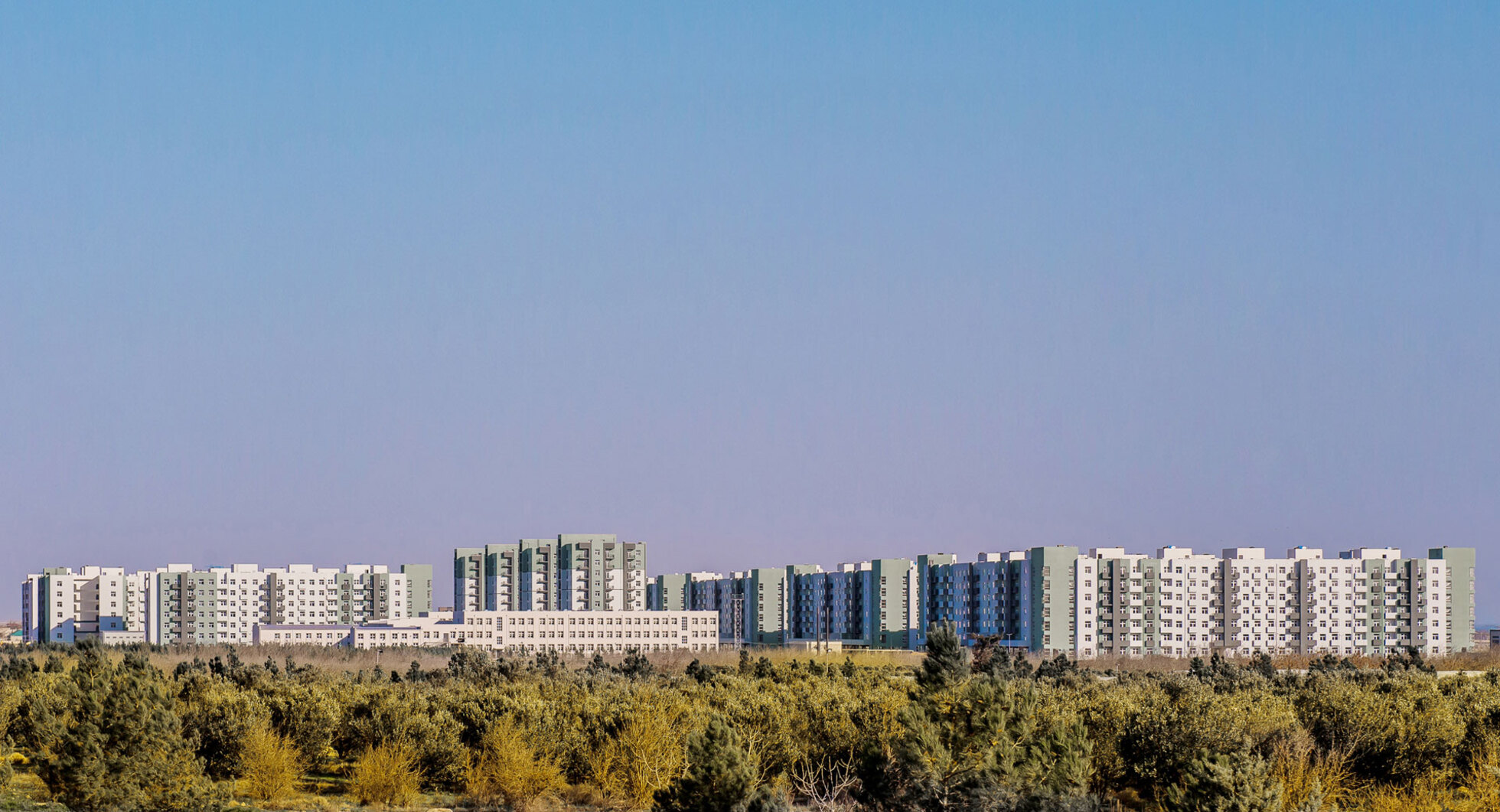
Hovsan Skyline

Hövsan is a municipality in the eastern part of Baku, Azerbaijan. It has a population of 85,000.

== Road ==
Zikh Baku Airport Highway.

== Rail ==
Baku suburban railway station is planned here.

== Notable natives ==
- Mirzaagha Aliyev — actor, People's Artist of USSR (1949).
- Namig Islamzadeh is an Azerbaijani military officer, major general serving in the Azerbaijani Armed Forces.
