= Denilson (footballer, born 2000) =

Brazilian footballer

Personal information
- Full name: Denilson Rodrigues Roldão
- Date of birth: 17 March 2000 (age 26)
- Place of birth: Rio de Janeiro, Brazil
- Height: 1.77 m (5 ft 10 in)
- Position: Midfielder

Team information
- Current team: Chanmari

Youth career
- 2016–2021: Fluminense

Senior career*
Years	Team	Apps	(Gls)
2021–2022	Bangladesh Police	10	(1)
2022–2023	Sertanense	22	(1)
2023–2024	Phnom Penh Crown	25	(7)
2024–2025	Bahrain SC		
2025	Atenas	11	(0)
2026	PSIS Semarang	10	(0)
2026–	Chanmari	0	(0)

International career
2015	Brazil U15	3	(0)
2016	Brazil U17	1	(0)
- * Club domestic league appearances and goals as of 3 May 2026

Denilson Rodrigues Roldão (born 17 March 2000), simply known as Denilson, is a Brazilian professional footballer who plays as a midfielder for Indian Football League club Chanmari.

== Career ==
He made his professional debut in the Bangladesh Football League for Bangladesh Police on 4 February 2022 in a game against Saif SC.

=== PSIS Semarang ===
On 30 December 2025, Denilson joins PSIS Semarang for the 2025–26 Championship. Denilson made his debut on 24 January 2026 in a match against Persela Lamongan at the Jatidiri Stadium, Semarang.
