= 2025–26 I-League 2 =

4th season of the Indian football third tier

- Season: 2025–26
- Dates: 27 March – 15 May 2026
- Teams: 10
- Champions: Delhi (2nd title)
- Promoted: Delhi; Bengaluru United
- Relegated: SA Tirur; NEROCA
- Matches: 36
- Goals: 95 (2.64 per match)
- Top goalscorer: Himanshu Jangra (13 goals)
- Biggest home win: Delhi 6–1 MYJ-GMSC (26 April 2026)
- Biggest away win: Sporting Bengaluru 3–5 NEROCA (21 April 2026)
- Highest scoring: Sporting Bengaluru 3–5 NEROCA (21 April 2026)
- Longest winning run: Delhi (4 matches)
- Longest unbeaten run: Delhi (5 matches)
- Longest winless run: MYJ-GMSC (4 matches)
- Longest losing run: MYJ-GMSC (4 matches)

The 2025–26 I-League 2 was the 4th season of I-League 2, the third tier of the Indian football league system. Diamond Harbour were the defending champions, having won the 2024–25 I-League 2.

The season started with Morning Star taking on Sudeva Delhi on 27th March 2026 at KASA Stadium, Diphu, Assam. On 15 May 2026, the final last matchday of the league, Delhi were crowned as champions while Bengaluru United finished as runners-up, with both earning promotion to the 2026–27 Indian Football League. SA Tirur and NEROCA were relegated to the 2026–27 I-League 3.

== Developments ==
- On 6 January 2026, the AIFF announced that due to shortened season, the 7 I-League 2 clubs and 26 2024–25 I-League 3 clubs would be merged, along with additional 7 clubs to form a 40-member league for this season. However, on 20 February, the federation did a u-turn, declaring that the 2026 Indian Football League 2 would possibly be a 10-club single-leg tournament.
- Nine clubs will participate in I-League 2, which will be played in a home-and-away single-leg format, with each team playing all opponents once, four at home and four away. Sporting are expected to choose Atal Stadium, Bambolim.
- SA Tirur withdrew from the tournament citing a lack of funds for travel expenses.

== Club changes ==
The following clubs changed since last season.

#	Club	Path
Entered I-League 2
1	Sporting Bengaluru	Relegation from I-League ▼
2	Delhi	Relegation from I-League ▼
3	Morning Star	Promotion from I-League 3 ▲
4	MYJ–GMSC	Promotion from I-League 3 ▲
5	Sudeva Delhi	Administratively admitted
Exited I-League 2
1	Diamond Harbour	Promotion to IFL ▲
2	Chanmari	Promotion to IFL ▲
3	TRAU	Relegation to I-League 3 ▼
4	KLASA	Relegation to I-League 3 ▼

== Clubs ==
2026 Indian Football league 2 group stage clubs

Club	Location	Stadium	Capacity
Bengaluru United	Bengaluru, Karnataka	Padukone–Dravid CSE Arena 1	250
MYJ–GMSC	Mumbai, Maharashtra	Cooperage Ground	5,000
Morning Star	Diphu, Assam	KASA Stadium	9,000
NEROCA	Imphal, Manipur	Khuman Lampak Stadium	35,285
Sporting Goa	Panaji, Goa	Bambolim Stadium	3,000
Sudeva Delhi	New Delhi, Delhi	Sudeva Residential Academy	TBC
United	Kalyani, West Bengal	Kalyani Stadium	20,000
Sporting Bengaluru	Bengaluru, Karnataka	HAL Stadium	TBC
Delhi	New Delhi, Delhi	Minerva Academy Ground	TBC

== Personnel and sponsorship ==
Club	Head coach	Captain	Kit manufacturer	Shirt sponsor
Bengaluru United	(India) Nallappan Mohanraj	(India) Faiz Khan	Hyve	Nimidia
NEROCA	(India) Gift Raikhan	(India) Waikhom Rohit Meitei	Vamos	
Sporting Goa	(India) Armando Colaco	(India) Joel Colaco	Six5Six	Models
MYJ–GMSC	(India) Vijith Shetty	(India) Kamlesh Nadar		
United	(India) Lal Kamal Bhowmick	(India) Tarak Hembram	Trak-Only	Aahar Caterer
Sporting Bengaluru	(India) Alex Praveen	(India) Manoj Kannan		
Delhi	(Bhutan) Lobzang Dorji	(India) Himanshu Jangra		
Morning Star	(India) Khogen Singh Wangkhem	(India) Komalson Rongphar		
Sudeva Delhi	(India) Zahid Shafi Mir	(India) Seiminmang Manchong		

== League table ==
Pos	Team	Pld	W	D	L	GF	GA	GD	Pts	Promotion or relegation
1	Delhi (C, P)	8	5	2	1	20	10	+10	17	Promotion to IFL
2	Bengaluru United (P)	8	4	3	1	12	6	+6	15 (Note: Tied on head-to-head result and head-to-head goal difference. Total goal difference: Bengaluru United +6, United +2.)	Promotion to IFL
3	United	8	4	3	1	7	5	+2	15	
4	Sporting Bengaluru	8	3	2	3	13	15	−2	11	
5	Morning Star	8	2	4	2	10	7	+3	10	
6	Sudeva Delhi	8	3	1	4	6	7	−1	10	
7	Sporting Goa	8	3	1	4	8	11	−3	10	
8	MYJ–GMSC	8	1	2	5	8	19	−11	5 (Note: Head-to-head result: MYJ-GMSC 2–1 NEROCA.)	
9	NEROCA (R)	8	1	2	5	11	15	−4	5	Relegation to IL3
10	SA Tirur (R)	0	0	0	0	0	0	0	0	Withdrew

Source: IFL AIFF
Rules for classification: 1) points; 2) Head-to-head result; 3) goal difference; 4) goals scored; 5) fair play ranking; 6) drawing of lots.
(C) Champions; (P) Promoted; (R) Relegated

== Fixtures and results ==
Home \ Away	DEL	BEN	USC	KAM	SCG	SCB	SUD	NER	MYJ
Delhi	—			2–1	2–1	5–1			6–1
Bengaluru United	3–1	—	1–1		4–1	0–0		2–1	
United	1–1		—	1–1			1–0	1–0	
Morning Star		0–1		—	1–1		0–0		4–0
Sporting Goa			0–1		—	1–2	1–0		2–1
Sporting Bengaluru			2–0	0–1		—		3–5	
Sudeva Delhi	1–2	1–0				0–2	—		1–0
NEROCA	1–1			2–2	0–1		1–3	—	
MYJ–GMSC		1–1	0–1			3–3		2–1	—

Source: IFL
Legend: Blue = home team win; Yellow = draw; Red = away team win.

=== Results by games ===
Match	1	2	3	4	5	6	7	8
Bengaluru United	D	D	W	W	L	W	W	D
Morning Star	D	L	D	W	L	W	D	D
Sporting Bengaluru	D	D	W	L	L	W	L	W
United SC	W	W	D	L	W	D	W	D
NEROCA	D	L	L	L	W	L	D	L
MYJ–GMSC	D	L	W	L	L	L	L	D
Delhi	D	W	W	W	W	L	W	D
Sudeva Delhi	D	L	L	W	W	L	L	W
Sporting Goa	L	W	D	W	L	W	L	L

Source: IFL
W = Win; D = Draw; L = Loss

== Statistics ==
=== Top scorers ===
As of 15 May 2026

Rank	Player	Club	Goals
1	(India) Himanshu Jangra	Delhi	13
2	(India) Phijam Sanathoi Meitei	NEROCA FC	6
3	(India) Akshunna Tyagi	Bengaluru United	4
3	(India) Devadath S	Sporting Bengaluru	4
5	(India) Kevisanyu Peseyie	Morning Star	3
5	(India) Rahul Paswan	Morning Star	3
5	(India) Akash Tirkey	Delhi	3
5	(India) Lijo K	Bengaluru United	3
5	(India) Karthick Thirumalai	Sporting Bengaluru	3
10	(India) Aravindraj Rajan	MYJ–GMSC	2
10	(India) Shravan Shetty	MYJ–GMSC	2
10	(India) Alocious Muthayyan	NEROCA FC	2
10	(India) Lalsiem Chongloi	Morning Star	2
10	(India) Asif O M	Sporting Bengaluru	2
10	(India) Alister Anthony	Sporting Goa	2
10	(India) Joyson Regan Gauncar	Sporting Goa	2
10	(India) Singte George Kom	United	2
10	(India) Sumay Shome	United	2
10	(India) Wungshung Lungleng	Delhi	2
10	(India) Md Ejaj Ahamad	Sudeva Delhi	2

=== Hat-tricks ===
Player	For	Against	Result	Date	Ref
(India) Phijam Sanathoi Meetei	NEROCA	Sporting Bengaluru	5–3 (A)	20 April 2026	
(India) Himanshu Jangra	Delhi	MYJ-GMSC	6–1 (H)	26 April 2026	
(India) Himanshu Jangra	Delhi	Sporting Bengaluru	5–1 (H)	9 May 2026	

== Overall attendances ==
Pos	Team	Total	High	Low	Average	Change
1	Morning Star	19,500	9,300	2,700	5,433	n/a^{††}
2	NEROCA	4,655	1,679	687	1,163	+72.0%
3	MYJ–GMSC	2,755	1,150	200	688	n/a^{††}
4	United	2,600	1,200	400	650	+136.4%
5	Sporting Goa	1,421	500	300	355	+21.6%
6	Sporting Bengaluru	617	452	65	205	−59.2%^{†}
7	Bengaluru United	898	293	100	179	−19.7%
8	Delhi	715	375	70	178	−97.6%^{†}
9	Sudeva Delhi	600	250	0	150	−41.6%
	League total	33,761	9,300	0	937	+27.5%

Source: I-League
Notes:
^{†} Delhi and Sporting Bengaluru played in the I-League in the 2024–25 season.
^{††} Attendance count for MYJ–GMSC and Morning Star starts from this season.

=== Attendance by home matches ===
Team \ Match played	1	2	3	4	5	Total
Bengaluru United	293	100	175	130	200	898
Delhi	375	170	70	100	—N/a	715
Morning Star	9,300	2,700	4,300	3,200	—N/a	19,500
MYJ–GMSC	823	582	1,150	200	—N/a	2,755
NEROCA	1,539	1,679	687	750	—N/a	4,655
Sporting Goa	500	300	321	300	—N/a	1,421
Sporting Bengaluru	452	100	65	—N/a		617
Sudeva Delhi	200	0	250	150	—N/a	600
United	400	700	300	1,200	—N/a	2,600

Legend: Highest Lowest
Updated to game(s) played on 15 May 2026
Source: I-League

== See also ==
- Men
  - 2025–26 Indian Super League (Tier I)
  - 2025–26 Indian Football League (Tier II)
  - 2025–26 I-League 3 (Tier IV)
  - 2025–26 Indian State Leagues (Tier V)
  - 2025–26 AIFF Super Cup
  - 2025 Durand Cup
  - 2026 Reliance Foundation Development League
- Women
  - 2025–26 Indian Women's League (Tier I)
  - 2025–26 Indian Women's League 2 (Tier II)
