= Chhaygaon FC =

Chhaygaon
- Full name: Chhaygaon Football Club
- Short name: CFC
- Founded: October 2, 2024; 2 years ago
- Ground: Chhaygaon Mini Stadium
- Owner: Biswajit Das
- Head coch: Shantanu Basu
- League: Assam State Premier League; I-League 3
- 2024–25: Assam State Premier League, champions
Home colours	Away colours

Chhaygaon Football Club is an Indian professional football club based in Chhaygaon, Assam. The club was officially registered with the All India Football Federation on 2 October 2024.

== History ==
The club rose to prominence during the 2024–25 football season. Competing in the Assam State Premier League (ASPL), the team demonstrated significant dominance under the coaching of Shantanu Basu. On 10 June 2025, Chhaygaon secured the state championship by defeating Eleven Star Club 4–0 in the final held at Dhakuakhana. Following this victory, the club earned promotion to the I-League 3, the fourth tier of the Indian football league system.

== Crest and colours ==
The club's primary colors had been red and white. The club is representative of the Kamrup district and maintains a strong local following in the Chhaygaon region.

== Honours ==
=== State ===
- Assam State Premier League
  - (gold) Champions (1): 2024–25
