= FC Banaras Baghpat =

Association football club in Uttar Pradesh, India

Banaras Baghpat
- Full name: Football Club Banaras Baghpat
- Nickname: The Warriors
- Short name: FCBB
- Founded: 2025; 1 year ago
- President: Akhilesh Kumar Singh
- Head coach: Vivek Singh
- League: Uttar Pradesh Football Sangh League (reserves); Baghpat District League; I-League 2
- 2025–26: I-League 3, champions
| Home colours | Away colours | Third colours |

Football Club Banaras Baghpat, commonly known as Banaras or Banaras Baghpat, is a professional football club based in Baghpat, Uttar Pradesh, India. They are registered with the All India Football Federation (AIFF). The club won the 2025–26 I-League 3 championship, earning promotion to the I-League 2 for the 2026–27 season.

== History ==
FC Banaras is based in Baghpat, a district in western Uttar Pradesh. The club participated in the I-League 3 for the 2025–26 season, making their debut at the national level. Ahead of the season, Vivek Singh was appointed as head coach. The club also brought in Kivilu Kiba from Nagaland as assistant coach.

The 2025–26 I-League 3 began on 27 April 2026. FC Banaras Baghpat were placed in group D alongside FC Agniputhra, New Friends Club, Techtro Swades United, and Royal Rangers, with matches held at the Padukone-Dravid Centre for Sports Excellence in Bengaluru. FC Banaras Baghpat won the 2025–26 I-League 3 title, earning promotion to the I-League 2 for the 2026–27 season.

== Technical staff ==
As of May 2026

| Title | Name |
|---|---|
| President | (India) Akhilesh Kumar Singh |
| Head coach | (India) Vivek Singh |
| Assistant coach | (India) Kivilu Kiba |

== Honours ==
=== Domestic ===
League

- Uttar Pradesh Football Sangh League
  - Champions (1): 2025
- I-League 3
  - Champions (1): 2025–26

== See also ==
- Football in India
- Indian football league system
- Uttar Pradesh Football Sangh
