= FC Raengdai =

Association football club in Manipur, India

Raengdai
- Full name: Football Club Raengdai
- Short name: FCR
- Founded: 2022; 4 years ago
- Ground: Various
- President: Gangmei Angam
- Head coach: Birbal Singh Kshetrimayum
- League: Manipur State League; I-League 2
- 2025–26: I-League 3, runners-up (promoted)
Home colours	Away colours

Football Club Raengdai is a professional football club based in Noney, Manipur, India. They are registered with the All India Football Federation (AIFF). The club earned promotion to the I-League 2 after finishing runners-up in the 2025–26 I-League 3.

== History ==
FC Raengdai is based in Noney, a district in the western part of Manipur. The club participated in the I-League 3 for the 2025–26 season, marking their debut at the national level. Ahead of the season, Birbal Singh Kshetrimayum was appointed as head coach.

The 2025–26 I-League 3 began on 27 April 2026. FC Raengdai were placed in Group A alongside ARA FC, Mawlai SC, Sikkim Brotherhood and Sunrise Club Orissa, with matches held at Khuman Lampak Stadium in Imphal. The club advanced to the final round and eventually finished runners-up in the competition, earning promotion to the I-League 2 for the 2026–27 season.

== Honours ==
=== Domestic ===
League

- I-League 3
  - Runners-up (1): 2025–26

== See also ==
- Football in India
- Indian football league system
- Manipur State League
