= 2024–25 Mohun Bagan Super Giant season =

Indian football club season

Mohun Bagan Super Giant
2024–25 season
- Head coach: José Francisco Molina
- Stadium: Vivekananda Yuba Bharati Krirangan; Mohun Bagan Ground
- Indian Super League: Champions
- ISL Playoffs: Champions
- ACL Two: withdrawn
- Super Cup: Semi Finals
- Durand Cup: Runners-up
- Calcutta Football League: First Stage
- Top goalscorer: League: Jamie Maclaren (11); All: Jamie Maclaren (12)
- Highest home attendance: 61,591 vs FC Goa, Indian Super League
- Lowest home attendance: 6,925 vs Indian Air Force, Durand Cup
- Average home league attendance: 35,743
- Biggest win: 8–1 vs Railways FC, Calcutta Football League
- Biggest defeat: 3–0 vs Bengaluru FC Indian Super League
Home colours	Away colours
- All statistics correct as of 30 April 2025.

The 2024–25 Mohun Bagan Super Giant season is the club's 5th season in Indian Super League and 135th season since its establishment in 1889.

In the 2024–25 Indian Super League Mohun Bagan became the first team to successfully defend their League title as they won their 2nd consecutive League Shield and 7th Indian League title with a 1–0 win against Odisha FC with two matches left. Mohun Bagan ended their league stage campaign with a win over FC Goa with 2–0, shattering numerous ISL and Indian football team records, notably being the first Indian club to reach 1000 points in cummulative Indian top division leagues competitions.

== Team management ==
Position	Name
Head coach	(Spain) José Francisco Molina
Assistant coach	(Serbia) Igor Taševski
Assistant coach	(India) Bastob Roy
Goalkeeping coach	(Spain) Francisco J. Martinez
Fitness coach	(Spain) Sergio Garcia Toribo
Team Doctor	(India) Nelson Pinto
Team Manager	(India) Abhishek Bhattacharjee
Physiotherapist	(India) Abhinandan Chatterjee
Physiotherapist	(India) Kaushik Bhuiya
Youth/Reserve team Head coach	(India) Deggie Cardozo

== Squad ==
As of 19 July 2024

=== Promoted from youth system ===
No.	Name	Position	Date of Birth (Age)
3	Raj Basfore	RB	15 March 2003 (age 23)
32	Dippendu Biswas	CB	24 April 2003 (age 23)
36	Amandeep Vrish Bhan	LB	3 August 2004 (age 22)
30	Taison Singh	RW	11 August 2004 (age 22)
63	Saurabh Bhanwala	CB	18 December 1999 (age 26)
71	Salahudheen Adnan K	RW	21 May 2001 (age 25)
80	Serto Worneilen Kom	SS	5 March 2004 (age 22)

First team players
No.	Name	Position	Nat	Date of Birth (Age)	Date signed	Contract end	App	Goals	Assists	Transfer notes
Goalkeepers
1	Vishal Kaith	GK	(India)	22 July 1996 (age 30)	8 July 2022	2029	99	0	0	Signed from Chennaiyin FC
12	Dheeraj Singh	GK	(India)	4 July 2000 (age 26)	24 July 2024	2025	4	0	0	Signed from FC Goa
24	Syed Zahid	GK	(India)	16 April 2003 (age 23)	1 September 2023	2027	2	0	0	Signed from Indian Arrows
31	Arsh Anwer Shaikh	GK	(India)	9 July 2002 (age 24)	1 June 2020	2025	12	0	0	Signed from ATK
Defenders
2	Sumit Rathi	CB / LB	(India)	26 August 2001 (age 25)	15 August 2020	2025	26	0	0	Signed from ATK
3	Raj Basfore	CB / LB / RB	(India)	15 March 2003 (age 23)	2022	2025	6	0	0	Signed from United SC
4	Nuno Reis	CB	(Portugal)	31 January 1991 (age 35)	15 September 2024	2026	2	0	0	Signed from Melbourne City FC
5	Tom Aldred	CB	(Scotland)	11 September 1990 (age 36)	2 July 2024	2026	32	3	1	Signed from Brisbane Roar FC
15	Subhasish Bose (Captain)	CB / LB	(India)	15 August 1995 (age 31)	13 August 2020	2025	169 (Note: Has Previously Played for Mohun Bagan (2016-17))	11	6	Signed from Mumbai City FC
21	Alberto Rodríguez	CB	(Spain)	31 December 1992 (age 33)	5 July 2024	2026	26	5	1	Signed from Persib Bandung
32	Dippendu Biswas	CB / RB	(India)	24 April 2003 (age 23)	1 January 2024	2027	24	1	2	Youth system
36	Amandeep Vrish Bhan	CB / LB	(India)	3 August 2004 (age 22)	20 January 2024	2025	8	0	0	Signed from Indian Arrows
44	Asish Rai	RB / RM	(India)	27 January 1999 (age 27)	20 June 2022	2027	91	2	7	Signed from Hyderabad FC
63	Saurabh Bhanwala	CB	(India)	18 December 1999 (age 26)	1 December 2024	2025	6	0	0	Youth system
77	Ravi Bahadur Rana	RB / LB	(India)	15 October 2002 (age 24)	1 August 2021	2025	15	0	0	Signed from Jamshedpur FC
Midfielders
6	Anirudh Thapa	DM / CM	(India)	15 January 1998 (age 28)	23 June 2023	2028	56	4	3	Signed from Chennaiyin FC
9	Dimitri Petratos	AM / RW / SS / ST / LW	(Australia)	10 November 1992 (age 34)	18 July 2022	2026	90	33	21	Signed from Al Wehda FC
10	Greg Stewart	AM	(Scotland)	17 March 1990 (age 36)	19 July 2024	2025	25	4	6	Signed from Kilmarnock F.C.
16	Abhishek Suryavanshi	CM	(India)	12 March 2001 (age 25)	14 August 2021	2027	45	0	0	Youth system
18	Sahal Abdul Samad	AM / LW / RW / LM / RM	(India)	1 April 1997 (age 29)	14 July 2023	2028	52	5	9	Signed from Kerala Blasters FC
22	Deepak Tangri	CB / DM / CM	(India)	1 February 1999 (age 27)	29 June 2021	2026	84	2	2	Signed from Chennaiyin FC
33	Glan Martins	DM / CM	(India)	1 July 1994 (age 32)	23 January 2023	2026	41	0	0	Signed from FC Goa
45	Lalengmawia Ralte	DM / CM	(India)	7 October 2000 (age 26)	25 June 2024	2029	27	1	0	Signed from Mumbai City FC
71	Salahudheen Adnan K	DM	(India)	26 May 2001 (age 25)	12 June 2024	2026	3	0	1	Youth system
Attackers
11	Manvir Singh	ST /RW/ RM	(India)	6 November 1995 (age 31)	25 August 2020	2027	145	30	27	Signed from FC Goa
13	Ningomba Engson Singh	LW / RW	(India)	2 January 2003 (age 23)	29 October 2020	2025	8	0	0	Signed from ATK
17	Liston Colaco	ST / LM / LW	(India)	12 November 1998 (age 28)	9 June 2021	2027	126	28	21	Signed from Hyderabad FC
19	Ashique Kuruniyan	LW / RW	(India)	14 June 1997 (age 29)	20 June 2022	2025	52	1	5	Signed from Bengaluru FC
27	Md. Fardin Ali Molla	ST	(India)	10 April 2002 (age 24)	9 November 2021	2025	16	1	2	Signed from Mohammedan SC
29	Jamie Maclaren	ST	(Australia)	29 July 1993 (age 33)	22 July 2024	2028	25	12	2	Signed from Melbourne City FC
35	Jason Cummings	ST/SS	(Australia)	1 August 1995 (age 31)	1 July 2023	2026	67	30	11	Signed from Central Coast Mariners FC
50	Taison Singh	RW/RM	(India)	11 August 2004 (age 22)	2022	2025	5	0	0	Signed from Indian Arrows
72	Suhail Bhat	ST	(India)	8 April 2005 (age 21)	1 June 2023	2025	31	5	0	Signed from Indian Arrows

== Transfers ==
=== In ===
No.	Pos.	Player	Transferred from	Fee	Date
45	DM	(India) Lalengmawia Ralte	(India) Mumbai City FC	Undisclosed	25 June 2024
5	CB	(Scotland) Tom Aldred	(Australia) Brisbane Roar FC	Free Agent	2 July 2024
21	CB	(Spain) Alberto Rodríguez	(Indonesia) Persib Bandung	Free Agent	5 July 2024
10	FW	(Scotland) Greg Stewart	(Scotland) Kilmarnock F.C.	Free Agent	19 July 2024
29	FW	(Australia) Jamie Maclaren	(Australia) Melbourne City FC	Free Agent	22 July 2024
12	GK	(India) Dheeraj Singh	(India) FC Goa	Free Agent	24 July 2024
4	CB	(Portugal) Nuno Reis	(Australia) Melbourne City FC	Free Agent	15 September 2024

=== Out ===
No.	Pos.	Player	Transferred to	Fee	Date
25	AM	(India) Kiyan Nassiri	(India) Chennaiyin FC	Contract expiration	14 June 2024
23	GK	(India) Debnath Mondal		Contract expiration	17 June 2024
14	CM	(India) Lalrinliana Hnamte	(India) Chennaiyin FC	Contract expiration	27 June 2024
5	CB	(Australia) Brendan Hamill	(Australia) Melbourne Victory FC	Contract expiration	28 June 2024
8	CM	(Finland) Joni Kauko	(India) Inter Kashi	Contract expiration	28 June 2024
26	CB	(Spain) Héctor Yuste	(India) East Bengal FC	Contract expiration	28 June 2024
99	ST	(Albania) Armando Sadiku	(India) FC Goa	Contract expiration	28 June 2024
4	CB	(India) Anwar Ali	(India) Delhi FC	Loan termination (Note: Mohun Bagan had signed a 4-year loan deal with Delhi for the transfer of Anwar Ali in 2023–24 season, but he decided to end it prematurely to return to his parent club and join East Bengal on a subsequent permanent transfer, followed by an appeal to the AIFF Players Status and Registration Committee. Following the committee's interim order of 3 August, that the loan termination was "without a just cause", Ali was allowed to join East Bengal at his own risk and Mohun Bagan issued a NOC to Ali on 10 August for his transfer to East Bengal.)	10 August 2024
2	ST	(India) Sumit Rathi	(India) Northeast United FC	Mutual Termination	5 February 2025

== Preseason and Midseason friendly ==
=== Chief Minister's Cup ===
On 2 September 2024, East Bengal and Mohun Bagan Super Giant played an exhibition Kolkata Derby match for the promotion of football in the state of Uttar Pradesh at the K. D. Singh Babu Stadium, Lucknow.

2 September 2024 Chief Ministers Cup	Mohun Bagan SG	1–1 (3–2 p)	East Bengal	Lucknow, India
18:00 IST	Suhail Bhat 18'		72' Muhammed K. Ashique	Stadium: KD Singh Babu Stadium; Referee: Ashwin K.
	Penalties
	Serto Worneilen Kom (penalty scored); Sibajit Singh (penalty missed); Adil Abdulla (penalty scored); Leewan Castanha (penalty missed); Ravi Bahadur Rana (penalty scored)		(penalty missed) Tanmay Das; (penalty missed) Vishnu; (penalty scored) Muhammed K. Ashique; (penalty missed) Muhammed Musharaf; (penalty scored) Chaku Mandi

=== Mid-season Friendly ===
22 April 2025 Super Cup friendly	Mohun Bagan SG	5–1	City AC	Kolkata, India
18:00 IST	Suhail Bhat; Serto Worneilen Kom; Salahudheen Adnan			Stadium: Salt Lake Stadium Practice ground 1 Man of the Match: Suhail Bhat

== Competitions (Senior Team) ==
=== Overview ===
Competition	First match (round)	Latest match (round)	Final position
AFC Champions League Two	18 September; Group Stage	18 September; Group Stage	Considered Withdrawn
Durand Cup	27 July; Group stage	31 August; Final	Runners-up
Indian Super League	13 September; Matchday 1	8 March; Matchday 24	Champions (1st of 13)
Indian Super League Playoffs	3 April; Semi Final Leg 1	12 April; Final	Champions
Super Cup	26 April Quarter-finals	30 April Semi Finals	Semi Finals

Competition	Record							
Competition	Pld	W	D	L	GF	GA	GD	Win %
Durand Cup	4	3	0	1	13	7	+6	75.00
Indian Super League	24	17	5	2	47	16	+31	70.83
ISL Playoffs	3	2	0	1	5	3	+2	66.67
AFC Champions League Two	1	0	1	0	0	0	+0	0.00
Total	32	22	6	4	65	26	+39	68.75

Last updated: 12 April 2025
Source: Competitions

- Includes Only The Games Played Under José Francisco Molina

Competition	Record							
Competition	Pld	W	D	L	GF	GA	GD	Win %
Durand Cup	1	1	0	0	1	0	+1	100.00
Super Cup	2	1	0	1	3	4	−1	50.00
Total	3	2	0	1	4	4	+0	66.67

Last updated: 30 April 2025
Source: Competitions

- Includes Only The Games Played Under Bastob Roy (Asst of José Francisco Molina)

== Matches ==
=== Durand Cup ===
==== Group stage ====
Pos	Team	Pld	W	D	L	GF	GA	GD	Pts	Qualification	MBG	EAB	DTH	IAF
1	Mohun Bagan (H)	3	2	1	0	7	0	+7	7	Advanced to knockout stage		CAN (Note: The match was cancelled by the organising body on security grounds and both teams were awarded 1 point each.)	1–0	6–0
2	East Bengal (H)	3	2	1	0	6	2	+4	7	Advanced to knockout stage			3–1	3–1
3	Downtown Heroes	3	1	0	2	3	4	−1	3					
4	Indian Air Force	3	0	0	3	1	11	−10	0				0–2	

Source: Twitter
Rules for classification: Group stage tiebreakers
(H) Hosts
Notes:

27 July 2024 Match 1	Mohun Bagan	1–0	Downtown Heroes	Kolkata, West Bengal
16:00 IST	Suhail 73'	Report		Stadium: Vivekananda Yuba Bharati Krirangan; Attendance: 8,356; Referee: Crystal John; Man of the Match: Suhail Bhat (Mohun Bagan SG)

8 August 2024 Match 2	Mohun Bagan	6–0	Indian Air Force	Kolkata, West Bengal
16:00 IST	Cummings 4', 76'; Aldred 10'; Colaco 38'; Thapa 65'; Stewart 90+1'	Report		Stadium: Vivekananda Yuba Bharati Krirangan; Attendance: 6,925; Referee: Aditya Purkayastha; Man of the Match: Jason Cummings (Mohun Bagan SG)

18 August 2024 Match 3	Mohun Bagan	Cancelled	East Bengal	Kolkata, West Bengal
19:00 IST				Stadium: Vivekananda Yuba Bharati Krirangan
Note: The match was cancelled by the organising body on security grounds and both teams were awarded 1 point each.

==== Knockout stage ====
Quarter-finals
21 August – Kokrajhar
NorthEast United	2
Indian Army	0
21 August – Shillong
Shillong Lajong	2
East Bengal	1
23 August – Jamshedpur
Mohun Bagan	3(6)
Punjab	3(5)
23 August – Kolkata
Bengaluru	1
Kerala Blasters	0

Semi-finals
26 August – Shillong
NorthEast United	3
Shillong Lajong	0
27 August – Kolkata
Mohun Bagan	2(4)
Bengaluru	2(3)

Final
31 August – Kolkata
NorthEast United	2(4)
Mohun Bagan	2(3)

23 August 2024 Quarter-finals	Mohun Bagan	3–3 (6–5 p)	Punjab	Jamshedpur
16:00	Suhail 45'; Manvir 48'; Cummings 79'	Report	Majcen 17'; Filip 62'; Vidal 71'	Stadium: JRD Tata Sports Complex; Attendance: 3,759; Referee: Mrutyunjay L Amatya; Man of the Match: Ezequiel Vidal (Punjab FC)
	Penalties
	Cummings (penalty missed); Manvir (penalty scored); Liston (penalty scored); Petratos (penalty scored); Greg (penalty scored); Subhasish (penalty scored); Aldred (penalty scored)		Vinit (penalty scored); Vidal (penalty scored); Bakenga (penalty scored); Filip (penalty scored); Novoselec (penalty missed); Melroy (penalty scored); Denechandra (penalty missed)

27 August 2024 Semi-finals	Mohun Bagan	2–2 (4–3 p)	Bengaluru	Kolkata, West Bengal
17:30 IST	Petratos 68' (pen.); Thapa 84'	Report	Chhetri 43' (pen.); Venkatesh 51'	Stadium: Vivekananda Yuba Bharati Krirangan; Attendance: 28.405; Referee: Venkatesh R Man of the Match: Vishal Kaith (Mohun Bagan)
	Penalties
	Cummings (penalty scored); Manvir (penalty scored); Colaco (penalty scored); Petratos (penalty scored); Stewart (penalty missed)		(penalty scored) Méndez; (penalty scored) Bheke; (penalty scored) Pedro; (penalty missed) Narzary; (penalty missed) Jovanović

31 August 2024 Final	Mohun Bagan	2–2 (3–4 p)	NorthEast United	Kolkata
17:30	Cummings 11' (pen.); Sahal 45+5'	Report	Ajaraie 55'; Guillermo 58'	Stadium: Salt Lake Stadium; Attendance: 52,391; Referee: Harish Kundu; Man of the Match: Gurmeet Singh (NorthEast United)
	Penalties
	Cummings (penalty scored); Manvir (penalty scored); Colaco (penalty missed); Petratos (penalty scored); Subhasish (penalty missed)		Guillermo (penalty scored); Zabaco (penalty scored); Parthib (penalty scored); Ajaraie (penalty scored)

=== AFC Champions League Two ===
==== Group stage ====
Pos	Team	Pld	W	D	L	GF	GA	GD	Pts	Qualification	TRA	WAK	RAV	MBSG
1	(Iran) Tractor	4	3	1	0	16	4	+12	10	Advance to round of 16	—	3–3	7–0	~~2 Oct~~
2	(Qatar) Al-Wakrah	4	1	1	2	4	8	−4	4	Advance to round of 16	0–3	—	0–2	~~6 Nov~~
3	(Tajikistan) Ravshan Kulob	4	1	0	3	3	11	−8	3		1–3	0–1	—	~~27 Nov~~
4	(India) Mohun Bagan SG	0	0	0	0	0	0	0	0	Withdrew, record expunged (Note: On 7 October 2024, AFC announced that Mohun Bagan SG were considered to have withdrawn from the AFC Champions League Two after they failed to appear for their fixture against Tractor in Tabriz due to safety concerns. Their single match was expunged.)	~~4 Dec~~	~~23 Oct~~	~~0–0~~	—

Source: AFC
Rules for classification: Tiebreakers
Notes:

18 September 2024	Mohun Bagan (India)	Voided (0–0)	(Tajikistan) Ravshan Kulob	Vivekananda Yuba Bharati Krirangan Stadium, Kolkata
19:30 UTC+5:30		Report		Attendance: 18,908; Referee: Ahmed Issa (United Arab Emirates)

2 October 2024	Tractor (Iran)	Cancelled	(India) Mohun Bagan	Yadegar-e Emam Stadium, Tabriz
19:30 UTC+3:30		The match on 02 October 2024 was cancelled by Asian Football Confederation as Mohan Bagan SG refused to travel to Tabriz, Iran citing security reasons followed by the current advisory by the Embassy of The Republic of India in Tehran, Iran due to the process of state mourning for Hezbollah leader Hassan Nasrallah. Consequently on 7 October, AFC announced that Mohun Bagan SG were considered to have withdrawn from the AFC Champions League Two.

23 October 2024	Mohun Bagan (India)	Cancelled	(Qatar) Al-Wakrah	Vivekananda Yuba Bharati Krirangan Stadium, Kolkata
19:30 UTC+5:30

6 November 2024	Al-Wakrah (Qatar)	Cancelled	(India) Mohun Bagan	Al Janoub Stadium, Al Wakrah
19:00 UTC+3

27 November 2024	Ravshan Kulob (Tajikistan)	Cancelled	(India) Mohun Bagan	Central Republican Stadium, Dushanbe (Note: Ravshan Kulob played their home matches at Central Republican Stadium, Dushanbe, instead of their regular home stadium Kulob Markazii Stadium, Kulob, which did not meet AFC requirements.)
19:00 UTC+5

4 December 2024	Mohun Bagan (India)	Cancelled	(Iran) Tractor	Vivekananda Yuba Bharati Krirangan Stadium, Kolkata
21:30 UTC+5:30

=== Indian Super League ===
==== League table ====
Pos	Team	Pld	W	D	L	GF	GA	GD	Pts	Qualification
1	Mohun Bagan (C, W)	24	17	5	2	47	16	+31	56	Qualification for the Champions League Two group stage and semi-finals
2	Goa	24	14	6	4	43	27	+16	48	Qualification for the Champions League Two preliminary stage and semi-finals (Note: Goa qualified for the AFC Champions League Two preliminary stage by winning the 2025 Super Cup.)
3	Bengaluru	24	11	5	8	40	31	+9	38 (Note: Head-to-head points: Bengaluru 7, NorthEast 7, Jamshedpur 3; Head-to-head goal difference: Bengaluru +2, NorthEast -2.)	Qualification for the knockouts
4	NorthEast United	24	10	8	6	46	29	+17	38	Qualification for the knockouts
5	Jamshedpur	24	12	2	10	37	43	−6	38	Qualification for the knockouts

Source: ISL
Rules for classification: 1) points; 2) goal difference; 3) number of goals scored; 4) head-to-head points; 5) head-to-head goal difference; 6) head-to-head goals scored; 7) fair play ranking; 8) drawing of lots
(Note: Head-to-head record is used only after all the matches between the teams in question have been played).
(C) Champions; (W) ISL Cup winners

==== Result summary ====
Overall								Home						Away					
Pld	W	D	L	GF	GA	GD	Pts	W	D	L	GF	GA	GD	W	D	L	GF	GA	GD
24	17	5	2	47	16	+31	56	11	1	0	26	6	+20	6	4	2	21	10	+11

==== Results by round ====
Round	1	2	3	4	5	6	7	8	9	10	11	12	13	14	15	16	17	18	19	20	21	22	23	24
Position	6	4	8	4	3	2	2	2	1	1	1	1	1	1	1	1	1	1	1	1	1	1	1	1

Updated to match(es) played on 13 September 2024. Source: Indian Super League
A = Away; H = Home; W = Win; D = Draw; L = Loss

13 September 2024 1	Mohun Bagan	2–2	Mumbai City FC	Kolkata, India
19:30 IST	Tiri 09' (o.g.) Alberto Rodriguez 28'	Report	Tiri 70' Thaer Krouma 90'	Stadium: Vivekananda Yuba Bharati Krirangan; Attendance: 41002; Man of the Match: Tiri (Mumbai City FC)

23 September 2024 2	Mohun Bagan	3–2	NorthEast United FC	Kolkata, India
19:30 IST	Dipendu Biswas 10'; Subhasish Bose 61'; Jason Cummings 87'	Report		Stadium: Vivekananda Yuba Bharati Krirangan; Attendance: 23055; Man of the Match: Greg Stewart (Mohun Bagan SG)

28 September 2024 3	Bengaluru FC	3–0	Mohun Bagan	Bengaluru, India
19:30 IST	Édgar Méndez 9'; Suresh Singh Wangjam 18'; Sunil Chettri (P) 52'	Report		Stadium: Sree Kanteerava Stadium; Attendance: 15,323; Man of the Match: Sunil Chettri (Bengaluru FC)

5 October 2024 4	Mohun Bagan	3–0	Mohammedan SC	Kolkata, India
19:30 IST	Jamie Maclaren 8'; Subhasish Bose 31'; Greg Stewart 36'	Report		Stadium: Vivekananda Yuba Bharati Krirangan; Attendance: 40,001; Man of the Match: Subhasish Bose (Mohun Bagan SG)

19 October 2024 5	East Bengal FC	0–2	Mohun Bagan	Kolkata, India
19:30 IST		Report	Jamie Maclaren 42'; Dimi Petratos 89' (pen.)	Stadium: Vivekananda Yuba Bharati Krirangan; Attendance: 59,782; Man of the Match: Greg Stewart (Mohun Bagan SG)

30 October 2024 6	Hyderabad FC	0–2	Mohun Bagan	Hyderabad, India
19:30 IST		Report	Manvir Singh 37'; Subhasish Bose 55'	Stadium: G. M. C. Balayogi Athletic Stadium; Man of the Match: Manvir Singh (Mohun Bagan SG)

10 November 2024 7	Odisha FC	1–1	Mohun Bagan	Bhubaneswar, India
19:30 IST	Hugo Boumous 04'	Report	Manvir Singh 36'	Stadium: Kalinga Stadium; Referee: Crystal John; Man of the Match: Lalengmawia Ralte (Mohun Bagan SG)

23 November 2024 8	Mohun Bagan	3–0	Jamshedpur FC	Kolkata, India
19:30 IST	Tom Aldred 15'; Liston Colaco 45+2'; Jamie Maclaren 75'	Report		Stadium: Vivekananda Yuba Bharati Krirangan; Attendance: 31,035; Man of the Match: Manvir Singh (Mohun Bagan SG)

30 November 2024 9	Mohun Bagan	1–0	Chennaiyin FC	Kolkata, India
19:30 IST	Jason Cummings 86'	Report		Stadium: Vivekananda Yuba Bharati Krirangan; Attendance: 29,456; Man of the Match: Greg Stewart (Mohun Bagan SG)

8 December 2024 10	NorthEast United FC	0–2	Mohun Bagan	Guwahati, India
19:30 IST		Report	Manvir Singh 65'; Liston Colaco 71'	Stadium: Indira Gandhi Athletic Stadium; Attendance: 15,379; Man of the Match: Asish Rai (Mohun Bagan SG)

14 December 2024 11	Mohun Bagan	3–2	Kerala Blasters FC	Kolkata, India
19:30 IST	Jamie Maclaren 33'; Jason Cummings 86'; Alberto Rodriguez 90+5'	Report	Jesús Jiménez 51'; Miloš Drinčić 77'	Stadium: Vivekananda Yuba Bharati Krirangan; Attendance: 35,598; Man of the Match: Ashique Kuruniyan (Mohun Bagan SG)

20 December 2024 12	FC Goa	2–1	Mohun Bagan	Panaji, India
19:30 IST	Brison Fernandez 12', 68'	Report	Dimi Petratos 55' (pen.)	Stadium: Fatorda Stadium; Man of the Match: Brison Fernandez (FC GOA)

26 December 2024 13	Punjab FC	1–3	Mohun Bagan	Delhi, India
19:30 IST	Ricky Shabong 12'	Report	Alberto Rodríguez 48', 69'; Jamie Maclaren 64' (pen.)	Stadium: Jawaharlal Nehru Stadium, Delhi; Man of the Match: Alberto Rodríguez (Mohun Bagan SG)

2 January 2025 14	Mohun Bagan	3–0	Hyderabad FC	Kolkata, India
19:30 IST	Stefan Šapić 09' (o.g.); Tom Aldred 41'; Jason Cummings 51'	Report		Stadium: Vivekananda Yuba Bharati Krirangan; Attendance: 36,889; Man of the Match: Liston Colaco (Mohun Bagan SG)

11 January 2025 15	Mohun Bagan	1–0	East Bengal FC	Guwahati, India
19:30 IST	Jamie Maclaren 2'	Report		Stadium: Indira Gandhi Athletic Stadium; Attendance: 2,567; Man of the Match: Jamie Maclaren (Mohun Bagan SG)

17 January 2025 16	Jamshedpur FC	1–1	Mohun Bagan	Jamshedpur, India
19:30 IST	S.Eze 60'	Report	Subhasish Bose 25'	Stadium: JRD Tata Sports Complex; Attendance: 13,875; Man of the Match: S.Eze (Jamshedpur FC)

21 January 2025 17	Chennaiyin FC	0–0	Mohun Bagan	Chennai, India
19:30 IST		Report		Stadium: Jawaharlal Nehru Indoor Stadium; Man of the Match: Irfan Yadwad (Chennaiyin FC)

27 January 2025 18	Mohun Bagan	1–0	Bengaluru FC	Kolkata, India
19:30 IST	Liston Colaco 74'	Report		Stadium: Vivekananda Yuba Bharati Krirangan; Attendance: 41,925; Man of the Match: Lalengmawia Ralte (Mohun Bagan SG)

1 February 2025 19	Mohammedan SC	0–4	Mohun Bagan	Kolkata, India
19:30 IST		Report	Subhasish Bose 12', 43'; Manvir Singh 20', 53'	Stadium: Vivekananda Yuba Bharati Krirangan; Attendance: 10,189; Man of the Match: Jason Cummings (Mohun Bagan SG)

5 February 2025 20	Mohun Bagan	3–0	Punjab FC	Kolkata, India
19:30 IST	Jamie Maclaren 56', 90'; Greg Stewart 63'	Report		Stadium: Vivekananda Yuba Bharati Krirangan; Attendance: 28,817; Man of the Match: Jamie Maclaren (Mohun Bagan SG)

15 February 2025 21	Kerala Blasters FC	0–3	Mohun Bagan	Kerala, India
19:30 IST		Report	Jamie Maclaren 28', 40'; Alberto Rodriguez 66'	Stadium: Jawaharlal Nehru International Stadium; Man of the Match: Jamie Maclaren (Mohun Bagan SG)

23 February 2025 22	Mohun Bagan	1–0	Odisha FC	Kolkata, India
19:30 IST	Dimi Petratos 90+3'	Report		Stadium: Vivekananda Yuba Bharati Krirangan; Attendance: 56,997; Man of the Match: Dimi Petratos (Mohun Bagan SG)

1 March 2025 23	Mumbai City FC	2–2	Mohun Bagan	Mumbai, India
17:00 IST	Jon Toral 57'; Nathan Asher Rodrigues 89'; Vikram Pratap Singh (yellow card) 43' (yellow-red card) 58'; Jayesh Rane (yellow card) 82'; Yoëll van Nieff (yellow card) 84'	Report	Jamie Maclaren 32'; Dimi Petratos 41'; Tom Aldred (yellow card) 24'; Dippendu Biswas (yellow card) 45'; Subhashish Bose (yellow card) 61'; Abhishek Suryavanshi (yellow card) 67'; Deepak Tangri (yellow card) 90+6'	Stadium: Mumbai Football Arena

8 March 2025 24	Mohun Bagan	2–0	FC Goa	Kolkata, India
19:30 IST	Boris Singh Thangjam 62' (o.g.); Greg Stewart 90+4'; Asish Rai (yellow card) 50'; Alberto Rodriguez (yellow card) 64'; Ashique Kuruniyan (yellow card) 64'	Report	Aakash Sangwan (yellow card) 6'; Boris Singh Thangjam (yellow card) 62'	Stadium: Vivekananda Yuba Bharati Krirangan; Attendance: 61,591; Referee: Rahul Kumar Gupta; Man of the Match: Tom Aldred (Mohun Bagan SG)

=== ISL Playoffs ===
Knockout
4	NorthEast United	0
5	Jamshedpur	2
3	Bengaluru	5
6	Mumbai City	0

Semifinals
1	Mohun Bagan	1	2	3
5	Jamshedpur	2	0	2
2	Goa	0	2	2
3	Bengaluru	2	1	3

Finals
1	Mohun Bagan (a.e.t.)	2
3	Bengaluru	1

==== Semi Finals ====
3 April 2025 Leg 1	Jamshedpur	2–1	Mohun Bagan	Jamshedpur
19:30 IST	Javier Siverio 24'; Javi Herenendez 90+1'; Ashutosh Mehta (yellow card) 36'; Javier Siverio (yellow card) 54'; Stephen Eze (yellow card) 90+5'	ISL; AIFF; I-League	Jason Cummings 37'; Jamie Maclaren (yellow card) 90+4'	Stadium: JRD Tata Sports Complex; Attendance: 20,968; Referee: Ashwin; Man of the Match: Javi Herenendez (Jamshedpur FC)

7 April 2025 Leg 2	Mohun Bagan	2–0 (3–2 agg.)	Jamshedpur	Kolkata
19:30 IST	Cummings 51' (pen.); Apuia 90+4'; Tom Aldred (yellow card) 28'	ISL; AIFF; I-League	Nikhil Barla (yellow card) 25'; Seiminlen Doungel (yellow card) 45+2'; Javi Hernández (yellow card) 56'	Stadium: Vivekananda Yuba Bharati Krirangan; Attendance: 58,123; Referee: Tejas Visvasrao Nagvenkar; Man of the Match: Apuia (Mohun Bagan SG)

==== Final ====
12 April 2025 Final	Mohun Bagan	2–1 (a.e.t.)	Bengaluru	Kolkata
19:30 IST	Jason Cummings 72' (pen.); Jamie Maclaren 96'; Apuia (yellow card) 90'; Deepak Tangri (yellow card) 106'; Greg Stewart (yellow card) 111'; Ashique Kuruniyan (yellow card) 111'	ISL; AIFF; I-League	Alberto Rodriguez 49' (o.g.); Jorge Pereyra Díaz (yellow card) 85'; Pedro Capó (yellow card) 88'; Sivasakthi Narayanan (yellow card) 118'	Stadium: Vivekananda Yuba Bharati Krirangan; Attendance: 59,112; Man of the Match: Jamie Maclaren (Mohun Bagan SG)

=== Super Cup ===
Round of 16
20 April
8	Kerala Blasters	2
9	East Bengal	0
21 April
2	Goa	3
IL4	Gokulam Kerala	0
21 April
7	Odisha	0
10	Punjab	3
23 April
3	Bengaluru	1 (3)
IL2	Inter Kashi (p)	1 (5)
23 April
6	Mumbai City	4
11	Chennaiyin	0
24 April
4	Northeast United	6
13	Mohammedan	0
24 April
5	Jamshedpur	2
12	Hyderabad	0

Quarter-finals
26 April
8	Kerala Blasters	1
1	Mohun Bagan	2
26 April
2	Goa	2
10	Punjab	1
27 April
IL2	Inter Kashi	0
6	Mumbai City	1
27 April
4	Northeast United	0 (4)
5	Jamshedpur (p)	0 (5)

Semi-finals
30 April
1	Mohun Bagan	1
2	Goa	3
30 April
6	Mumbai City	0
5	Jamshedpur	1

Final
3 May
2	Goa	3
5	Jamshedpur	0

==== Matches ====
26 April 2025 Quarter-finals	Kerala Blasters	1–2	Mohun Bagan	Bhubaneswar, Odisha, India
16:30 IST (UTC+05:30)	Sreekuttan M S 90+4'; Milos Drincic (yellow card) 89'	AIFF; I-League	Sahal Abdul Samad 22'; Suhail 51'; Ashique Kuruniyan (yellow card) 45'; Saurabh Bhanwala (yellow card) 90+5'	Stadium: Kalinga Stadium; Attendance: 1,103; Referee: Venkatesh Ramachadran; Man of the Match: Salahudheen Adnan (Mohun Bagan SG)

30 April 2025 Semi-Final	Mohun Bagan	1–3	FC Goa	Bhubaneswar, Odisha, India
16:30 IST (UTC+05:30)	Suhail 23' (yellow card) 79'; Sahal Abdul Samad (yellow card) 89'	AIFF; I-League	Brison Fernandez 17'; Boris Singh (yellow card) 48'; Iker Guarrotxena 51'; Borja 58'; Aakash Sangwan (yellow card) 90'	Stadium: Kalinga Stadium; Referee: Harish Kundu; Man of the Match: Borja Herrera (FC Goa)

== Player Statistics ==
=== Appearances ===
As of 30 April 2025

Appearances for Mohun Bagan in 2024–25 season
No.	Pos.	Nat.	Name	Durand Cup		Indian Super League		ISL Playoffs		Super Cup		Calcutta Football League		ACL TWO		Total	
No.	Pos.	Nat.	Name	Apps	Starts	Apps	Starts	Apps	Starts	Apps	Starts	Apps	Starts	Apps	Starts	Apps	Starts
Goalkeepers
1	GK	(India)	Vishal Kaith	4	4	23	23	3	3	—				1	1	31	31
12	GK	(India)	Dheeraj Singh	1	0	1	1	—		2	2	—		0	0	4	3
24	GK	(India)	Syed Zahid Bukhari	1	1	—						0	0	—		1	1
41	GK	(India)	Abhishek Balowary	—								3	3	—		3	3
42	GK	(India)	Raja Barman	—								9	9	—		9	9
Defenders
2	CB / LB	(India)	Sumit Rathi	1	1	—						8	7	—		9	8
3	CB / LB / RB	(India)	Raj Basfore	1	1	—						10	10	—		11	11
5	CB	(Portugal)	Nuno Reis	—						2	2	—				2	2
5	CB	(Scotland)	Tom Aldred	5	5	23	22	3	3	—				1	1	32	31
15	CB / LB	(India)	Subhasish Bose	4	3	22	22	3	3	—				1	1	30	29
21	CB	(Spain)	Alberto Rodríguez	4	3	19	19	3	3	—				—		26	25
32	CB / RB	(India)	Dippendu Biswas	2	1	14	11	—		2	2	1	1	1	1	20	16
36	LB	(India)	Amandeep	—						2	2	8	7	1	0	11	9
44	RB	(India)	Asish Rai	5	2	21	19	3	3	—				1	1	30	25
52	DF	(India)	Brijesh Giri	—								11	5	—		11	5
55	DF	(India)	Pritam Meetei	—								3	1	—		3	1
63	CB	(India)	Saurabh Bhanwala	1	0	3	1	—		2	2	5	5	—		11	8
77	RB / LB	(India)	Ravi Bahadur Rana	1	1	—						12	8	—		13	9
84	DF	(India)	Sayan Das	—								7	6	—		7	6
Midfielders
06	CM	(India)	Anirudh Thapa	3	2	15	8	3	3	—				1	1	22	14
9	AM / RW / SS / ST / LW	(Australia)	Dimitri Petratos	3	1	21	12	3	0	—				1	1	28	14
10	AM	(Scotland)	Greg Stewart	4	2	18	11	2	1	—				1	0	25	14
11	ST /RW/ RM	(India)	Manvir Singh	4	3	23	21	2	1	—				1	1	30	26
13	LW / RW	(India)	Engson Singh	—								9	9	—		9	9
16	CM	(India)	Abhishek Suryavanshi	5	3	11	4	—		2	2	4	4	1	0	23	13
17	ST / LM / LW	(India)	Liston Colaco	4	4	24	21	3	3	—				1	0	32	28
18	AM / LW / RW / LM / RM	(India)	Sahal Abdul Samad	4	4	17	8	2	1	2	2	—		1	1	26	16
19	LW / RW	(India)	Ashique Kuruniyan	1	0	15	2	3	1	2	2	—				21	5
22	CB / DM / CM	(India)	Deepak Tangri	2	2	17	11	2	1	2	2	—		1	1	24	17
33	DM / CM	(India)	Glan Martins	1	1	—				1	0	1	1	—		3	2
45	DM / CM	(India)	Lalengmawia Ralte	4	3	20	20	2	2	—				1	0	27	25
50	RW/RM	(India)	Taison Singh	1	1	—				1	0	9	7	—		11	8
53	MF	(India)	Leewan Castanha	—								9	6	—		9	6
56	MF	(India)	Sandeep Malik	—								5	5	—		5	5
59	MF	(India)	Satgougun Kipgen	—								1	0	—		1	0
66	MF	(India)	Sibajit Singh	—								5	3	—		5	3
70	MF	(India)	Tapan Halder	—								5	0	—		5	0
71	RW	(India)	Salahudheen Adnan K	1	1	—				2	2	12	8	—		15	11
74	MF	(India)	Sahil Kar	—								2	0	—		2	0
81	MF	(India)	Thumsol Tongsin	—								7	2	—		7	2
Forwards
27	ST	(India)	Fardin Ali Molla	—								10	8	—		10	8
29	ST	(Australia)	Jamie Maclaren	—		22	19	3	2	—						25	21
35	ST/SS	(Australia)	Jason Cummings	4	3	22	8	3	3	—				1	1	30	15
61	FW	(India)	Uttam Hansda	—								7	0	—		7	0
62	FW	(India)	Serto Kom	—						1	0	10	6	—		11	6
65	FW	(India)	Vian Vinay	—								8	1	—		8	1
72	ST	(India)	Suhail Bhat	3	3	11	1	—		2	2	6	6	—		22	12
90	FW	(India)	Adil Abdullah	—								4	3	—		4	3

=== Goal Scorers ===
As of 30 April 2025

Pos	No.	Name	Nat	Durand Cup	Indian Super League	ISL Playoffs	Super Cup	Total
1	29	Jamie Maclaren	(Australia)	0	11	1	0	12
2	35	Jason Cummings	(Australia)	4	4	3	0	11
3	11	Manvir Singh	(India)	1	5	0	0	6
3	15	Subhasish Bose	(India)	0	6	0	0	6
4	09	Dimi Petratos	(Australia)	1	4	0	0	5
4	21	Alberto Rodríguez	(Spain)	0	5	0	0	5
5	10	Greg Stewart	(Scotland)	1	3	0	0	4
5	72	Suhail Bhat	(India)	2	0	0	2	4
5	17	Liston Colaco	(India)	1	3	0	0	4
6	05	Tom Aldred	(Scotland)	1	2	0	0	3
7	7	Anirudh Thapa	(India)	2	0	0	0	2
7	18	Sahal Abdul Samad	(India)	1	0	0	1	2
8	45	Apuia	(India)	0	0	1	0	1
8	32	Dippendu Biswas	(India)	0	1	0	0	1
Own Goal(s)				0	3	0	0	3
Total				14	47	5	3	69

=== Most Assists ===
As of 30 April 2025

Pos	Name	Nationality	Durand	ISL	ISL Playoffs	Super Cup	Total
1	Jason Cummings	(Australia)	1	6	0	0	7
2	Greg Stewart	(Scotland)	1	5	0	0	6
2	Manvir Singh	(India)	2	4	0	0	6
3	Sahal Abdul Samad	(India)	3	1	0	0	4
3	Ashish Rai	(India)	1	3	0	0	4
3	Liston Colaco	(India)	2	2	0	0	4
4	Dimi Petratos	(Australia)	0	3	0	0	3
4	Anirudh Thapa	(India)	0	2	1	0	3
5	Jamie Maclaren	(Australia)	0	2	0	0	2
5	Ashique Kuruniyan	(India)	0	0	0	2	2
5	Dippendu Biswas	(India)	0	2	0	0	2
6	Subhasish Bose	(India)	0	1	0	0	1
6	Alberto Rodríguez	(Spain)	0	1	0	0	1
6	Tom Aldred	(Scotland)	0	1	0	0	1
6	Salahudheen Adnan	(India)	0	0	0	1	1

=== Clean sheets ===
As of 30 April 2025

Pos	Name	Durand Cup	ISL	ISL Playoffs	Super Cup	Total
1	(India) Vishal Kaith	1	14	1	0	16
2	(India) Dheeraj Singh	1	1	0	0	2
3	(India) Syed Zahid Bukhari	1	0	0	0	1

== Youth teams ==
=== Overview ===
Competition	First match (round)	Latest match (round)	Final position
Calcutta Football League	2 July; Group stage	8 September; Round 12	7/12 Group stage
UP CM CUP	2 September; Final	2 September; Final	Champions
Bhadreshwar Gold Cup	6 January; Semi Final	9 January; Final	Champions
2025 RFDL	14 January; Regional Group stage	14 April; National Championship Final	Champions
2025 Dream Sports Championship u17	5 February; Regional Qualifiers	15 April; National Championship Final	Runners-up
AIFF U17 League	5 January; Regional Group stage	8 May; National Championship Round	Quarter Finals
AIFF Junior League (U15)	8 February; Regional Group Stage	22 May; National Championship Round	Quarter Finals
AIFF Junior League (U13)	9 February; Regional Group Stage	18 May; National Group Stage	National Group Stage

=== U23, U21, U17 (Deggie Cardozo) ===
Competition	Record							
Competition	Pld	W	D	L	GF	GA	GD	Win %
RFDL	20	12	5	3	34	14	+20	60.00
Calcutta Football League	12	4	4	4	28	15	+13	33.33
U-17 League	10	9	1	0	24	3	+21	90.00
Dream Sports Championship u17 Zonal	3	2	1	0	5	3	+2	66.67
UP CM Cup	1	0	1	0	1	1	+0	0.00
Bhadreshwar Gold Cup	2	2	0	0	2	0	+2	100.00
Total	48	29	12	7	94	36	+58	60.42

Last updated: 14 April 2025
Source: Competitions

- Includes Only U23, U21, U17 (Under Deggie Cardozo)

Competition	Record							
Competition	Pld	W	D	L	GF	GA	GD	Win %
Dream Sports Championship u17 National Round	4	3	0	1	8	2	+6	75.00
U-17 League National Round	4	2	0	2	7	8	−1	50.00
Total	8	5	0	3	15	10	+5	62.50

Last updated: 08 May 2025
Source: Competitions

- Includes Only The Games Played Under Biswajit Ghoshal (Asst of Deggie Cardozo)

=== U15, U13 ===
Competition	Record							
Competition	Pld	W	D	L	GF	GA	GD	Win %
2025 Reliance Foundation Youth Sports (U15)	12	10	1	1	55	11	+44	83.33
AIFF JUNIOR LEAGUE (U15)	14	11	1	2	54	22	+32	78.57
Total	26	21	2	3	109	33	+76	80.77

Last updated: 20 May 2025
Source: Competitions

- U15: Tanumoy Basu

Competition	Record							
Competition	Pld	W	D	L	GF	GA	GD	Win %
2025 AIFF SUB JUNIOR LEAGUE (U13)	13	8	1	4	43	24	+19	61.54
Total	13	8	1	4	43	24	+19	61.54

Last updated: 18 May 2025
Source: Competitions

- U13: Chanchal Saha

== U23 ==
=== Group B ===
Pos	Team	Pld	W	D	L	GF	GA	GD	Pts
5	Kalighat SLA	12	6	1	5	21	17	+4	19
6	Calcutta Police	12	5	3	4	13	12	+1	18
7	Mohun Bagan SG	12	4	4	4	28	15	+13	16
8	George Telegraph	12	5	0	7	12	20	−8	15
9	ASOS Rainbow	12	2	7	3	15	17	−2	13

Source: The Away End
Rules for classification: 1) points; 2) head-to-head points; 3) head-to-head goal difference; 4) goal difference; 5) number of goals scored; 6) drawing of lots

=== Matches ===
2 July 2024 Match 1	Bhawanipore	1–1	Mohun Bagan	Barrackpore, India
15:00 IST	Jiten Murmu 27'; Safiul Rahaman (yellow card) 41'; Bikram Pradhan (yellow card) 46'; Madan Mandi (yellow card) 90'	Report	Sibajit Singh 7'	Stadium: Bibhutibhushan Bandopadhyay Stadium; Attendance: 1,000; Referee: Suvankar Das; Man of the Match: Sibajit Singh (Mohun Bagan SG)

6 July 2024 Match 2	ASOS Rainbow	2–2	Mohun Bagan	Barrackpore, India
15:00 IST	Aniket Ghosh (yellow card) 13'; Sourav Dasgupta 44', (yellow card) 80'; Rajon Barman 45+1', (yellow card) 90+6'; Rounak Pal (yellow card) 45+4'; Shilton Pal (yellow card) 90+7' (yellow-red card) AM'	Report	Suhail 14', 26'; Sayan Das (yellow card) 45+1'	Stadium: Bibhutibhushan Bandopadhyay Stadium; Attendance: 3,000; Referee: Debabrata Naskar; Man of the Match: Pankaj Moula (Rainbow AC)

13 July 2024 Match 3	Mohun Bagan	1–2	East Bengal	Kolkata, India
IST	Suhail 90+6'	Report	Aman CK (yellow card) 43'; PV Vishnu 51'; Jesin TK 64'; Joseph Justin (yellow card) 46' (yellow-red card) 77'; Debjit Majumder (yellow card) 90+5'	Stadium: Salt Lake Stadium; Attendance: 26,000; Referee: Pranjal Banerjee; Man of the Match: PV Vishnu (East Bengal FC)

18 July 2024 Match 4	Peerless	0–1	Mohun Bagan	Naihati, India
15:00 IST	Arlangky Nongsiej (yellow card) 43'; Amar Nath Baskey (yellow card) 65'	Report	Thumsol Tongsin 22'; Sumit Rathi (yellow card) 87'	Stadium: Naihati Stadium; Attendance: 1,632; Referee: Mithun Kumar Kundu; Man of the Match: Thumsol Tongsin (Mohun Bagan)

23 July 2024 Match 5	Calcutta Police	1–1	Mohun Bagan	Kalyani, India
15.00 IST	Sk Abdul Touhid (yellow card) 16' (yellow-red card) 90+2'; Samir Bayen (yellow card) 27'; Sk. Sahil Rahman (yellow card) 35'; Rabi Das 55'; Babai Jana (yellow card) 90+7'	Report	Suhail 40'; Suryavanshi (yellow card) 44' (yellow-red card) 90+4'; Fardin Ali Molla (yellow card) 69'	Stadium: Kalyani Stadium; Attendance: 1,000; Referee: Pratik Mondal; Man of the Match: Rabi Das (Calcutta Police)

30 July 2024 Match 6	Mohun Bagan	5–1	Tollygunge Agragami	Naihati, India
15.00 IST	Pritam Khatua 51' (o.g.); Suhail 59', 63', 70'; Leewan Castanha (yellow card) 80'; Salahudheen Adnan 90+4'	Report	Pritam Khatua (yellow card) 55'; Saurabh Bhanwala 75' (o.g.); Surojit Kundu (yellow card) 76'	Stadium: Naihati Stadium; Attendance: 1,000; Referee: Bimalendu Mondal; Man of the Match: Suhail Bhat (Mohun Bagan)

5 September 2024 Match 7	Mohun Bagan	1–2	Kalighat SLA	Barrackpore, India
IST	Adil 51' (pen.)	Report	Khanngam Horam 36'; Jp Goldenson (yellow card) 39'; Ashish Chhetri (yellow card) 45'; Bishal Chhetri (yellow card) 47'; Saikat Sarkar 71'	Stadium: Bibhutibhushan Bandopadhyay Stadium; Attendance: 150; Referee: Subhankar Khamri; Man of the Match: Irungbam Aboy Singh (Kalighat SLA)
Note: Match was postponed from 2 August due to unsuitable weather and playing conditions.

5 August 2024 Match 8	Mohun Bagan	5–0	Eastern Railway	Naihati, India
15.00 IST	Fardin 32'; Salahudheen Adnan 66', 82', 90+4'; Raj Basfore 80'	Report		Stadium: Naihati Stadium; Attendance: 1,540; Referee: Rohan DasGupta; Man of the Match: Salahudheen Adnan K (Mohun Bagan)

11 August 2024 Match 9	Mohun Bagan	1–2	George Telegraph	Kalyani, India
15.00 IST	Raj Basfore (yellow card) 12'; Serto Kom 30' (pen.); Sumit Rathi (yellow card) 45+3'	Report	Juwel Ahmed Mazumder (yellow card) 12'; Amit Ekka 52', 57'	Stadium: Kalyani Stadium; Attendance: 845; Referee: Nripen Halder; Man of the Match: Amit Ekka (George Telegraph)

14 August 2024 Match 10	Mohun Bagan	0–0	Calcutta Customs Club	Kalyani, India
15.00 IST	Salahudheen Adnan K (yellow card) 65'	Report	Akash Mondal (yellow card) 49'; Amit Chakraborty (yellow card) 63'; Babua Singh (yellow card) 67'; David Lalchhuanawma (yellow card) 79'	Stadium: Kalyani Stadium; Attendance: 250; Referee: Mithun Kumar Kundu; Man of the Match: Suvam Sen (Calcutta Customs Club)

25 August 2024 Match 11	Mohun Bagan	8–1	Railway FC	Barrackpore, India
15.00 IST	Serto Kom 21', 34' (pen.); Adil Abdullah 23'; Ravi Rana 30'; Salahudheen Adnan 38', 45+4'; Uttam Hansda 74'; Halder 88'	Report	Rahul Halder 6'	Stadium: Bibhutibhushan Bandopadhyay Stadium; Attendance: 250; Referee: Tanumoy Sarkar; Man of the Match: Salahudheen Adnan K (Mohun Bagan)
Note: Match was postponed from 23 August due to scheduling conflict with Durand Cup Quarter-Final.

9 September 2024 Match 12	Mohun Bagan	2–3	Police AC	Barrackpore, India
IST	Serto 88'; Vian 90+7'	Report	Sk Asif Ahmed 14'; Biswajit Chakraborty 32'; Sajjak Hossen (yellow card) 38'; Asish Bakshi 70'; Suraj Ali (yellow card) 90+6'	Stadium: Bibhutibhushan Bandopadhyay Stadium; Attendance: 800; Referee: Subhankar Khamri; Man of the Match: Sk Asif Ahmed (Police Ac)
Note: Match was postponed from 27 August due to scheduling conflict with Durand Cup Semi-Final.

=== Goals ===
As of 10 September 2024

Pos	Name	Goal
1	Suhail Bhat	7
2	Salahudheen Adnan	6
3	Serto Kom	4
4	Adil Abdullah	2
5	Uttam Hansda	1
5	Ravi Rana	1
5	Tapan Halder	1
5	Vian Murgod	1
5	Fardin Ali Molla	1
5	Raj Basfore	1
5	Thumsol Tongsin	1
5	Sibajit Singh	1

=== Assists ===
As of 14 July 2024

Pos	Name	Assists
1	Taison Singh	3
2	Fardin Ali Molla	1
2	Ravi Rana	1

== U21 ==
=== Squad ===
Note: Flags indicate national team as defined under FIFA eligibility rules; some limited exceptions apply. Players may hold more than one non-FIFA nationality.

No.	Pos.	Nation	Player
24	GK	IND	Syed Zahid
51	GK	IND	Nandan Roy
91	GK	IND	Priyansh Dubey
55	RB	IND	Pritam Meetei
77	RB	IND	Ravi Bahadur Rana (U-23)
79	LB	IND	Jetlee Singh
65	LB	IND	Marshal Kisku
36	LB	IND	Amandeep Vrish Bhan
3	CB	IND	Raj Basfore
4	CB	IND	Sahil Inamdar
73	CB	IND	Umer Muhther
78	CB	IND	Abhishek Mondal
53	CB	IND	Leewan Castanha
54	LM	IND	Dev Mal
43	LM	IND	Shibam Munda
72	LM	IND	Pasang Tamang
50	RM	IND	Taison Singh
37	RM	IND	Rahul Halder

No.	Pos.	Nation	Player
40	RM	IND	Haodamlian Vaiphei
44	CM	IND	Nishar
74	CM	IND	Sahil Kar
66	CM	IND	Sibajit Singh
30	CM	IND	Ningomba Engson Singh (U-23)
56	CM	IND	Sandeep Malik
81	CM	IND	Thumsol Tongsin
93	CM	IND	Lungoulal Kipgen
70	AM	IND	Tapan Halder
25	AM	IND	Tushar Biswakarma
10	FW	IND	Serto Kom
90	FW	IND	Adil Abdullah
99	FW	IND	Prem Hansdak
27	FW	IND	Fardin Ali Molla (U-23)
62	FW	IND	Vian Vinay Murgod
7	FW	IND	Suhail Bhat
80	FW	IND	Thangngaisang Haokip

=== RFDL Youth League ===
==== Regional Qualifiers [East Region] ====
Pos	Team	Pld	W	D	L	GF	GA	GD	Pts	Qualification
1	Mohun Bagan SG	5	3	2	0	8	1	+7	11	Advance to Zonal group stage
2	East Bengal	5	2	2	1	6	5	+1	8	Advance to Zonal group stage
3	Diamond Harbour	5	2	2	1	11	6	+5	8	Advance to Zonal group stage
4	Odisha	5	2	2	1	8	7	+1	8	
5	Mohammedan	5	2	0	3	6	8	−2	6	
6	United SC	5	0	0	5	2	14	−12	0	

Source: RFDL

14 January 2025 1	Odisha FC	1–1	Mohun Bagan SG	India
14:30 IST	Kartik Hantal 50'; Yumkhaibam Indranath (yellow card) 66'; Sahil Tamang (yellow card) 90+6'	Report	Pasang Dorjee Tamang 10'; Priyansh Dubey (yellow card) 31'; Sahil Inamdar (yellow card) 46'	Stadium: Kalyani Stadium; Attendance: 600; Referee: Simanta Kahar; Man of the Match: Pasang Dorjee Tamang (Mohun Bagan)

19 January 2025 2	Mohammedan SC	0–3	Mohun Bagan SG	India
14:30 IST	Kv Salman Faris (yellow card) 18'; Yash Chickro (yellow card) 35'; Lalngaihsaka (yellow card) 45+3' (yellow-red card) 81'; Pukhrambam Dinesh Meitei (yellow card) 53'	Report	Sandeep Malik (yellow card) 7'; Serto 45+4' (pen.), 48'; Tongsin 63'; Amandeep (yellow card) 73'	Stadium: Naihati Stadium; Attendance: 600; Referee: Dipu Roy; Man of the Match: Serto Kom (Mohun Bagan)

23 January 2025 3	Mohun Bagan SG	2–0	United Sports Club	India
14:30 IST	Taison Singh 25'; Pasang Dorjee Tamang 36'; Sahil Inamdar (yellow card) 76'	Report	Rajesh Rajbhar (yellow card) 31'; Nitesh Kumar Mondal (yellow card) 62'; Sumit Goswami (yellow card) 75'; Tushar Patra (yellow card) 87'	Stadium: Naihati Stadium; Attendance: 300; Referee: Shovan Roy; Man of the Match: Taison Singh (Mohun Bagan)

26 January 2025 4	Mohun Bagan SG	2–0	Diamond Harbour FC	India
11:30 IST	Umer Muhthar (yellow card) 38'; Serto Kom 40'; Haodamlian Vaiphei 79'; Pasang Dorjee Tamang (yellow card) 90+1'	Report	Benjamin Lalnunpuia (yellow card) 34'; Rajanbir Singh (yellow card) 90'	Stadium: Naihati Stadium; Attendance: 500; Referee: Rohan Das Gupta; Man of the Match: Serto Kom (Mohun Bagan)

29 January 2025 5	East Bengal FC	0–0	Mohun Bagan SG	India
14:30 IST	Sonam Tsewang Lhokham (yellow card) 72'	Report	Raj Basfore (yellow card) 37'; Tushar Biswakarma (yellow card) 45'	Stadium: Naihati Stadium; Attendance: 725; Referee: Bimalendu Mondal; Man of the Match: Suhail Bhat (Mohun Bagan)

=== Zonal Round ===
==== Kolkata–North region ====
Pos	Team	Pld	W	D	L	GF	GA	GD	Pts	Qualification	EAB	MBG	DHB	SUD	GRH
1	East Bengal	8	6	1	1	19	8	+11	19	Advance to National group stage		2–1	4–2	4–1	4–1
2	Mohun Bagan SG	8	4	2	2	12	8	+4	14	Advance to National group stage	1–0		0–0	3–2	0–1
3	Diamond Harbour	8	3	1	4	13	16	−3	10	Advance to National group stage	0–2	1–3		0–2	2–1
4	Sudeva Delhi	8	2	2	4	10	14	−4	8		1–1	0–2	1–2		0–0
5	Garhwal Heroes	8	1	2	5	11	19	−8	5		1–2	2–2	3–6	2–3	

Source: RFDL

7 February 2025 1	Mohun Bagan SG	0–0	Diamond Harbour	India
14:30 IST				Stadium: Naihati Stadium

10 February 2025 2	Mohun Bagan SG	1–0	East Bengal FC	India
14:30 IST	Tongsin			Stadium: Naihati Stadium

18 February 2025 3	East Bengal FC	2–1	Mohun Bagan SG	India
14:30 IST	Aromal 34'; Shyamal 72'		Pasang 77'	Stadium: Barrackpore Stadium

24 February 2025 4	Diamond Harbour	1–3	Mohun Bagan SG	India
14:30 IST		Report	Taison 64'; Shibam 76'; Tongsin 84'	Stadium: Barrackpore Stadium

4 March 2025 5	Sudeva Delhi	0–2	Mohun Bagan SG	India
10:00 IST			Pasang Dorjee Tamang; Umer Muhthar	Stadium: Naihati Stadium

7 March 2025 6	Garhwal Heroes	2–2	Mohun Bagan SG	India
14:30 IST			Vian; Raj Basfore	Stadium: Naihati Stadium

12 March 2025 7	Mohun Bagan SG	3–2	Sudeva Delhi	India
14:30 IST	Vaiphei 28'; Vian 76', 78' (pen.)			Stadium: Naihati Stadium

15 March 2025 8	Mohun Bagan SG	0–1	Garhwal Heroes	India
10:00 IST				Stadium: Naihati Stadium

=== National Group Stage ===
==== Group B ====
Pos	Team	Pld	W	D	L	GF	GA	GD	Pts	Qualification	CFA	MBG	MFA	DEM	SDE	MCI
1	Classic FA	5	3	1	1	6	3	+3	10	Advance to National Championship		0–0	0–1	2–0		
2	Mohun Bagan SG	5	3	1	1	6	4	+2	10	Advance to National Championship			2–1	0–2		
3	Muthoot FA	5	3	0	2	9	4	+5	9					3–1	0–1	
4	Dempo SC	5	2	1	2	7	6	+1	7							
5	Sreenidi Deccan	5	1	2	2	6	8	−2	5		2–3	0–2		1–1		
6	Mumbai City	5	0	1	4	3	12	−9	1		0–1	1–2	0–4	0–3	2–2	

Source: RFDL

24 March 2025 1	Mumbai City FC	1–2	Mohun Bagan u21	Navi Mumbai, India
16:00 IST	Sayyam Desai (yellow card) 40'; Mohammd Jaffer Altaf Mansoori 71'; Ayush Chhikara (yellow card) 78'	Report	Sibajit 43'; Vian 55'	Stadium: Reliance Corporate Park, (Artificial Pitch); Attendance: 100; Referee: Dinesh Shivnarayan Yadav; Man of the Match: Vian Vinay Murgod (Mohun Bagan)

27 March 2025 2	Mohun Bagan u21	2–1	Muthoot FA	Navi Mumbai, India
08:00 IST	Vian 19'; Sibajit 49' (pen.)	Report	Abith K B 34' (pen.); Mohammed Anas (yellow card) 48'	Stadium: Reliance Corporate Park, (Natural Pitch); Attendance: 100; Referee: Dinesh Shivnarayan Yadav; Man of the Match: Vian Vinay Murgod (Mohun Bagan)

30 March 2025 3	Sreenidi Deccan	0–2	Mohun Bagan u21	Navi Mumbai, India
16:00 IST		Report	Tongsin 12'; Ningombam Engson Singh (yellow card) 74'; Serto 80' (pen.)	Stadium: Reliance Corporate Park, (Artificial Pitch); Attendance: 50; Referee: Sahil Prakash Bhostekar; Man of the Match: Thumsol Tongsin (Mohun Bagan)

2 April 2025 4	Mohun Bagan u21	0–2	Dempo SC	Navi Mumbai, India
08:00 IST	Sahil Inamdar (yellow card) 49'; Vian Vinay Murgod (yellow card) 57'; Leewan Castanha (yellow card) 73'	Report	Swavel Cristiano Furtado 20'; Pratik Naik (yellow card) 41'; Velanco Elisson Rodrigues (yellow card) 43'; Sairon Albuquerque (yellow card) 90+3'	Stadium: Reliance Corporate Park, (Natural Pitch); Attendance: 50; Referee: Manbeer Singh Harwinder Singh Kalyan; Man of the Match: Rahul Peter Rodrigues (Dempo SC)

5 April 2025 5	Classic FA	0–0	Mohun Bagan u21	Navi Mumbai, India
19:00 IST	Punit Thangjam (yellow card) 30'	Report	Sibajit Singh (yellow card) 65'	Stadium: Reliance Corporate Park,(Natural Pitch); Attendance: 80; Referee: Dinesh Shivnarayan Yadav; Man of the Match: Khullakpam Zahir Khan (Classic Football Academy)

=== National Championship Round ===
All matches to be played at Reliance Corporate Park, Navi Mumbai.

Semifinals
A1	Jamshedpur	1
B2	Mohun Bagan SG	5
B1	Classic FA	3
A2	Goa	0

Final
SF1	Mohun Bagan SG	3
SF2	Classic FA	0
Third place
SF1	Jamshedpur	0
SF2	Goa	1

==== Semi Final ====
10 April 2025 Semi Final	Jamshedpur FC	1–5	Mohun Bagan u21	Navi Mumbai, India
08:00 IST	Laskar 13'	AIFF; I-League	Sahil Inamdar 18'; Leewan Castanha (yellow card) 19'; Taison 33'; Serto 45', 72'; Sibajit Singh (yellow card) 67'; Shibam 78'	Stadium: Reliance Corporate Park; Attendance: 225; Referee: Jarvish Macwan; Man of the Match: Serto Kom (Mohun Bagan)

==== Final ====
14 April 2025 Final	Mohun Bagan u21	3–0	Classic FA	Navi Mumbai, India
18:00 IST	Pasang Tamang 8', 23', 54'; Serto Kom (yellow card) 75'; Sibajit Singh (yellow card) 81'	Report	Punit Thangjam (yellow card) 60'	Stadium: Reliance Corporate Park; Attendance: 130; Referee: Jarvish Macwan; Man of the Match: Pasang Dorjee Tamang (Mohun Bagan)

=== Top Goalscorers ===
As of 14 April 2025

Pos	Name	RFDL Regional	RFDL Zonal	RFDL National Group	RFDL National Championship	Total
1	Pasang	2	2	0	3	7
2	Serto	3	0	1	2	6
3	Vian	0	3	2	0	5
4	Tongsin	1	2	1	0	4
5	Taison Singh	1	1	0	1	3
6	Vaiphei	1	1	0	0	2
6	Sibajit	0	0	2	0	2
6	Shibam	0	1	0	1	2
7	Umer Muhthar	0	1	0	0	1
7	Raj Basfore	0	1	0	0	1
7	Sahil	0	0	0	1	1
Total		8	12	6	8	34

== U17 ==
=== Squad ===
Note: Flags indicate national team as defined under FIFA eligibility rules; some limited exceptions apply. Players may hold more than one non-FIFA nationality.

No.	Pos.	Nation	Player
1	GK	IND	Suva Barai
51	GK	IND	Nandan Roy
99	GK	IND	Seiminlal Haokip
24	DF	IND	Jetlee Singh
4	DF	IND	Rupam Barik
28	DF	IND	Adrito Mahato
3	DF	IND	Aditya Mondal
44	DF	IND	Jayanta Mondal
21	DF	IND	Monu Rajbanshi
2	DF	IND	Abhishek Mondal
40	DF	IND	Rajdeep Kshetrapal
26	DF	IND	Mahammad Sarfaraz
29	MF	IND	Abrar Ali
7	MF	IND	Anish Das
33	MF	IND	Rintu Malik

No.	Pos.	Nation	Player
10	MF	IND	Bobby Singh
6	MF	IND	Sainak Ghosh
22	MF	IND	Rajib Bauldas
15	MF	IND	Aniket Biswas
16	MF	IND	Sabyasachi Dhar
19	MF	IND	Ali Hossain Khan
8	MF	IND	Stephen Doungle
27	MF	IND	Lungoulal Kipgen
31	MF	IND	Khaiminlal Khongsai
85	FW	IND	Thangngaisang Haokip
86	FW	IND	Prem Hansdak
87	FW	IND	Sagun Hembram
88	FW	IND	Akash Singh
89	FW	IND	Pritam Gain

=== Group Stage ===
Pos	Team	Pld	W	D	L	GF	GA	GD	Pts	MBSG	BFA	EBFC	AUSA	MSC	BMSA
1	Mohun Bagan SG	10	9	1	0	24	3	+21	28		1–0	1–0	1–0	2–1	3–2
2	Bengal Football Academy	10	8	0	2	27	7	+20	24	0–1		5–0	5–1	3–0	2–0
3	East Bengal FC	10	4	2	4	15	16	−1	14	0–0	1–5		1–2	3–2	2–0
4	Adamas United Sports Academy	10	2	3	5	7	16	−9	9	0–1	2–3	0–4		0–0	1–0
5	Mohammedan SC	10	2	2	6	8	19	−11	8	0–5	0–1	0–3	1–1		2–1
6	Bidhannagar Municipal Sports Academy	10	0	2	8	5	25	−20	2	0–9	1–3	1–1	0–0	0–2	

Updated to match(es) played on 27 January 2025. Source: AIFF

==== Group A ====
5 January 2025 1	Mohammedan SC u17	0–5	Mohun Bagan u17	Kolkata, India
14:00 IST			Prem Hansdak 14', 37', 82'; Thangngaslang Haokip 25'; Ali Hossain 89'	Stadium: Mohammedan Ground

8 January 2025 2	Mohun Bagan u17	1–0	Bengal Football Academy	Kolkata, India
10:30 IST	Kipgen 79'			Stadium: Mohun Bagan Ground

11 January 2025 3	Adamas United Sports Academy	0–1	Mohun Bagan u17	Kolkata, India
10:30 IST			Jayanta Mondal 21'	Stadium: Barrackpore Stadium

15 January 2025 4	Mohun Bagan u17	1–0	East Bengal u17	Kolkata, India
10:30 IST	Aditya Mondal 79'			Stadium: Mohun Bagan Ground

17 January 2025 5	Mohun Bagan u17	3–2	Bidhannagar Municipal Sports Academy	Kolkata, India
10:30 IST	Bobby 10', 46' (pen.); Haokip 39'			Stadium: Mohun Bagan Ground

20 January 2025 6	East Bengal u17	0–0	Mohun Bagan u17	Kolkata, India
10:30 IST				Stadium: East Bengal Ground

24 January 2025 7	Bengal Football Academy	0–1	Mohun Bagan u17	West Bengal, India
14:00 IST			Sarfaraz	Stadium: Khardah

27 January 2025 8	Bidhannagar Municipal Sports Academy	0–9	Mohun Bagan u17	West Bengal, India
14:00 IST		Report	Thangngaisang Haokip 13'; Prem Hansdak 15', 31', 34', 90'; Aditya Mondal 36'; Ali Hossain Khan 62', 85'; Pritam Gain 57'	Stadium: BMSA Ground

30 January 2025 9	Mohun Bagan u17	2–1	Mohammedan SC u17	Kolkata, India
10:30 IST	Kipgen 55'; Titas 58' (o.g.)			Stadium: Mohun Bagan Ground

2 February 2025 10	Mohun Bagan u17	1–0	Adamas United Sports Academy	West Bengal, India
10:30 IST	Kipgen 77'			Stadium: Mohun Bagan Ground

=== National Round (Group Stage) ===
Pos	Team	Pld	W	D	L	GF	GA	GD	Pts	BFA	MBSG	RFYC	KBFC
1	Bengal Football Academy	3	3	0	0	8	1	+7	9			5–1	
2	Mohun Bagan SG u17	3	2	0	1	7	3	+4	6	0–2			4–0
3	RF Young Champs	3	1	0	2	4	8	−4	3		1–3		
4	Kerala Blasters FC	3	0	0	3	0	7	−7	0	0–1		0–2	

Updated to match(es) played on 4 May 2025. Source: AIFF

2 May 2025 1	RF Young Champs	1–3	Mohun Bagan u17	Guwahati, Assam, India
15:30 IST	Roshan Xavier (yellow card) 75'; Vanlalthazuala 58'; Ahaan Kapoor (yellow card) 90'	Report	Prem Hansdak 13', 27', 33'; Jayanta Mondal (yellow card) 24'; Sarfaraz (yellow card) 84'; Aditya Mondal (yellow card) 90'	Stadium: LNIPE

4 May 2025 2	Mohun Bagan u17	4–0	Kerala Blasters FC	Guwahati, Assam, India
15:30 IST	Aditya Mondal (yellow card) 30'; Prem Hansdak 42'; Kipgen 45+2' (yellow card) 82'; Rajdwip Khatrapal (yellow card) 77'; Pritam Gain 86'; Bobby Singh 90+2' (yellow card) 90+4'	Report	Shaheeb Ali Karayil (yellow card) 41'; Muhammed Shamil K S (yellow card) 85'	Stadium: SAI Ground

6 May 2025 3	Mohun Bagan u17	0–2	Bengal Football Academy	Guwahati, Assam, India
15:30 IST		Report	Mrityunjay Sardar (yellow card) 13'; Deb Dhara 44'; Arel Murmu (yellow card) 53'; Tanbir Dey 66'	Stadium: SAI Ground

=== National Championship Round ===
Quarterfinals
A1	AIFF FIFA Talent Academy	5
B2	Mohun Bagan SG	0
C1	Northeast United	1
D2	Jamshedpur	2
B1	Bengal Football Academy	2
A2	Punjab FC	6
D1	Muthoot Football Academy	0
C2	FC Madras	5

Semifinals
QF1	AIFF FIFA Talent Academy	0
QF2	Jamshedpur	5
QF3	Punjab FC	3
QF4	FC Madras	2

Finals
SF1	Jamshedpur	1
SF2	Punjab FC	4

8 May 2025 Quarter Finals	AIFF FIFA Talent Academy	5–0	Mohun Bagan u17	Guwahati, Assam, India
08:30 IST	Tongbram Luxmikanta Singh 21', 56'; Thokchom Diamond Singh 82', 85'; Rahan Ahmed 87'; Malsawmtluanga (yellow card) 87'	Report		Stadium: Indira Gandhi Athletic Stadium

=== Top Goalscorers ===
As of 8 May 2025

Pos	Name	Regional	National	Total
1	Prem Hansdak	7	4	11
2	Kipgen	3	1	4
3	Ali Hossain	3	0	3
3	Thangngaslang Haokip	3	0	3
3	Bobby	2	1	3
4	Pritam Gain	1	1	2
4	Aditya Mondal	2	0	2
5	Jayanta Mondal	1	0	1
5	Sarfaraz	1	0	1
Total		23	7	30

=== Dream Sports Championship u17 ===
==== Kolkata Zone Qualifiers ====
Pos	Team	Pld	W	D	L	GF	GA	GD	Pts	MBSG	BFA	BMSA
1	Mohun Bagan SG u17	2	1	1	0	3	2	+1	4			0–0
2	Bengal Football Academy	2	1	0	1	5	4	+1	3	2–3		
3	Bidhannagar Municipal Sports Academy	2	0	1	1	1	3	−2	1		1–3	

Updated to match(es) played on 6 February 2025. Source:

5 February 2025 1	Mohun Bagan u17	0–0	Bidhannagar Municipal Sports Academy	Kolkata, India
09:00 IST				Stadium: NCE, Newtown.

6 February 2025 2	Bengal Football Academy	2–3	Mohun Bagan u17	West Bengal, India
09:00 IST			Prem 64'; Sarfaraz 90'; Kipgen 90+5'	Stadium: NCE, Newtown

==== Kolkata Zone Final ====
8 February 2025 3	Mohun Bagan u17	2–1	Mohammedan SC	Kolkata, India
09:00 IST	Prem Hansdak 49', 59'			Stadium: NCE, Newtown.

==== National Round (Group Stage) ====
Pos	Team	Pld	W	D	L	GF	GA	GD	Pts	MBSG	RFYC	CFC	DSC
1	Mohun Bagan SG u17	3	3	0	0	8	0	+8	9			3–0	
2	RF Young Champs	3	1	1	1	7	4	+3	4	0–2			
3	Chennaiyin FC	3	1	1	1	4	5	−1	4		2–2		2–0
4	Dempo SC	3	0	0	3	0	10	−10	0	0–3	5–0		

Updated to match(es) played on 12 April 2025. Source:

8 April 2025 1	RF Young Champs	0–2	Mohun Bagan u17	Goa, India
8:30 IST	Faris Ameerkannu (yellow card) 57'; Atul B Pulipra (yellow card) 66'; Jeffin James (yellow card) 76'	Report	Bobby Singh (yellow card) 17'; Monu Rajbanshi 39'; Thangngaisang Haokip 90'	Stadium: SAG Benaulim Ground

10 April 2025 2	Mohun Bagan u17	3–0	Chennaiyin FC	Goa, India
IST	Aditya Mondal 21'; Prem Hansdak 22'; Thangngaisang Haokip 90+4'; Ali Hossain Khan (yellow card) 81'; Jayanta Mondal (yellow card) 89'	Report	Potshangbam Abinash Singh (red card); James Thongmin Chongloi (yellow card) 81'	Stadium: Utorda Sports Complex

12 April 2025 3	Dempo SC	0–3	Mohun Bagan u17	Goa, India
IST		Report	Thangngaisang Haokip 1'; Khaiminlal Khongsai 60'; Thounaojam Jetlee Singh 68'	Stadium: SAG Benaulim Ground

==== National Championship (Final) ====
15 April 2025 Final	Mohun Bagan u17	0–2	Punjab FC	Goa, India
20:00 IST	Bobby Singh (yellow card) 10'	AIFF; Dream Sports	Subham Gurung 10'; Ashish Lohar 64'	Stadium: Raia Sports Ground

==== Top Goalscorers ====
As of 15 April 2025

Pos	Name	Zonal	National	Total
1	Prem Hansdak	3	1	4
2	Thangngaisang Haokip	0	3	3
3	Sarfaraz	1	0	1
3	Kipgen	1	0	1
3	Aditya Mondal	0	1	1
3	Monu Rajbanshi	0	1	1
3	Khaiminlal Khongsai	0	1	1
3	Jetlee Singh	0	1	1
Total		5	8	13

== U15 ==
- AIFF Junior League
- Reliance Foundation Youth Sports

=== Squad ===
Note: Flags indicate national team as defined under FIFA eligibility rules; some limited exceptions apply. Players may hold more than one non-FIFA nationality.

No.	Pos.	Nation	Player
1	GK	IND	Ranjan Malo
21	GK	IND	Priyanshu Das
31	GK	IND	Debayan Dutta Roy
18	DF	IND	Paban Das
48	DF	IND	Rupam Mahi
4	DF	IND	Papu Sarkar
25	DF	IND	Naim Mondal
17	DF	IND	Dipra Sarkar
16	DF	IND	Mikael Besra
23	DF	IND	Tapas Mondal
20	DF	IND	Sayan Paswan
3	DF	IND	Sandip Karmakar
22	DF	IND	Biswajit Debnath

No.	Pos.	Nation	Player
15	MF	IND	Roki Das
6	MF	IND	Akash SK
42	MF	IND	Hans Biswas
19	MF	IND	Dipanjan Das
2	MF	IND	Rohit Barman
11	MF	IND	Arko Bhaskar
12	MF	IND	Sahid Chowdhury
14	MF	IND	Joy Chakraborty
7	MF	IND	Oyshik Roy Chowdhury
9	FW	IND	Sumit Singh
8	FW	IND	Suroj Halder
10	FW	IND	Rajdeep Paul

=== Group Stage ===
Pos	Team	Pld	W	D	L	GF	GA	GD	Pts	MBSG	EBFC	BFA	BMSA	AUSA	MSC
1	Mohun Bagan	10	10	0	0	50	9	+41	30		3–1	6–2	10–1	2–0	5–0
2	East Bengal	10	5	1	4	26	17	+9	16	2–4		4–0	1–1	3–0	7–1
3	Bengal Football Academy	10	5	0	5	28	27	+1	15	1–4	4–3		1–0	7–1	7–3
4	Bidhannagar Municipal Sports Academy	10	4	2	4	16	24	−8	14	1–4	2–3	3–2		1–1	1–0
5	Adamas United Sports Academy	10	2	2	6	8	26	−18	8	1–7	1–0	0–3	1–2		3–1
6	Mohammedan	10	1	1	8	10	35	−25	4	0–5	1–2	3–1	1–4	0–0	

Updated to match(es) played on 7 March 2025. Source:

8 February 2025 1	East Bengal U15	2–4	Mohun Bagan U15	Kolkata, India
14:00 IST		Report	Rajdeep 25', 42', 60'; Rohit 47'	Stadium: Kalyani Stadium

11 February 2025 2	Mohun Bagan U15	5–0	Mohammedan SC U15	Kolkata, India
10:30 IST	Rajdeep 35', 56', 76', 90+1'; Oyshik Ray Chowdhury 89'	Report		Stadium: Bansberia Kishore Sangha Ground

14 February 2025 3	Bengal Football Academy	1–4	Mohun Bagan U15	Kolkata, India
14:00 IST		Report	Rohit 5', 17'; Sandip Karmakar 12'; Chowdhury Sahid 52'	Stadium: Vivekananda Stadium, Khardah

17 February 2025 4	Mohun Bagan U15	10–1	Bidhannagar Municipal Sports Academy	Kolkata, India
10:30 IST	Dipra 16'; Rajdeep 24', 41', 59', 68', 90'; Rohit 34', 90+1'; Oyshik 80'; Suroj 90'	Report		Stadium: Bansberia Kishore Sangha Ground

20 February 2025 5	Mohun Bagan U15	2–0	Adamas United Sports Academy	Kolkata, India
10:30 IST	Rohit 27', 66'	Report		Stadium: Bansberia Kishore Sangha Ground

23 February 2025 6	Bidhannagar Municipal Sports Academy	1–4	Mohun Bagan U15	Kolkata, India
14:30 IST		Report	Rajdeep 7', 57', 67', 88'	Stadium: BMSA Ground

26 February 2025 7	Mohammedan U15	0–5	Mohun Bagan U15	West Bengal, India
12:00 IST		Report	Rajdeep 6', 44'; Chowdhury Sahid 36'; Arko Bhaskar 51', 71'	Stadium: Sonarpur Kamalgazi Netaji Sports Complex

1 March 2025 8	Adamas United Sports Academy	1–7	Mohun Bagan U15	West Bengal, India
10:30 IST		Report	Rajdeep 35', 46'; Paban Das 45+3'; Roki Das 77'; Rohit 81', 90+1'; Akash SK 87'	Stadium: Vivekananda Stadium, Khardah

4 March 2025 9	Mohun Bagan U15	3–1	East Bengal U15	Kolkata, India
10:30 IST	Rohit Barman 45', 56'; Akash SK 88'	Report		Stadium: Bansberia Kishore Sangha Ground

7 March 2025 10	Mohun Bagan U15	6–2	Bengal Football Academy	West Bengal, India
10:30 IST	Rajdeep Paul 16', 36', 47', 57', 64'; Rohit Barman 44'	Report		Stadium: Bansberia Kishore Sangha Ground

=== National Round ===
==== Group B ====
Pos	Team	Pld	W	D	L	GF	GA	GD	Pts	MCFC	MBSG	SDE	FCG
1	Mumbai City FC	3	2	1	0	8	0	+8	7			3–0	5–0
2	Mohun Bagan SG	3	1	1	1	3	3	0	4	0–0		2–1	
3	Sreenidi Deccan	3	1	0	2	4	7	−3	3				3–2
4	FC Goa	3	1	0	2	4	9	−5	3		2–1		

Updated to match(es) played on 20 May 2025. Source:

16 May 2025 1	FC Goa	2–1	Mohun Bagan U15	Jamshedpur, India
16:00 IST	Trinsly Menezes 36'; Shlok Vishwas Govekar 50'; Aarush Sunil Sawant (yellow card) 65'	Report	Rajdeep Paul 56'	Stadium: JRD Tata Stadium

18 May 2025 2	Mohun Bagan U15	2–1	Sreenidi Deccan	Jamshedpur, India
16:00 IST	Rajdeep Paul 64', 82'; Sandip Karmakar (yellow card) 67'	Report	Faisal Khan Mustafakhan (yellow card) 9'; Konsam Alison Meitei 85'	Stadium: Flatlet Football Ground

20 May 2025 3	Mumbai City FC	0–0	Mohun Bagan U15	Jamshedpur, India
16:00 IST		Report		Stadium: Flatlet Football Ground

=== National Championship Round ===
==== Quarter Final ====
22 May 2025 QF	Bengaluru FC	10–1	Mohun Bagan U15	Jamshedpur, India
08:00 IST	Hrishikesh Charan Manavathi 1', 4', 37', 48'; Adith Issac Benny 14'; Mohammad Sohil Khan 24'; Thiyam Sambay 39'; Arvidrian Samwanki Lato 42'; Dhruv Shyam 52'; Akash Mondal 58'	Report	Paban Das (yellow card) 70'; Sumit Singh (yellow card) 72'; Rajdeep Paul (yellow card) 65', (goal) 75'	Stadium: JRD Tata Sports Complex

==== Top Goalscorers ====
As of 22 May 2025

Pos	Name	Group	National	Total
1	Rajdeep	25	4	29
2	Rohit	12	0	12
3	Oyshik Ray Chowdhury	2	0	2
3	Chowdhury Sahid	2	0	2
3	Arko Bhaskar	2	0	2
3	Akash SK	2	0	2
4	Sandip Karmakar	1	0	1
4	Paban Das	1	0	1
4	Rocky	1	0	1
4	Suroj	1	0	1
4	Dipra	1	0	1
Total		50	4	54

=== Reliance Foundation Youth Sports ===
==== Group F ====
13 December 2024 1	Mohun Bagan U15	12–2	Ariadaha Sports Club U15	Kolkata, India
10:30 IST				Stadium: Kalyani B3 Ground

18 December 2024 2	Mohun Bagan U15	11–0	Aditya Academy Secondary U15	Kolkata, India
08:30 IST				Stadium: Kalyani B3 Ground

20 December 2024 3	Mohun Bagan U15	4–2	Purba Barasat Adarsha Vidyapeeth HS U15	Kolkata, India
12:30 IST				Stadium: Kalyani B3 Ground

==== Zonal Qualification Round (Round 2) ====
28 December 2024 1	Mohun Bagan U15	4–0	Bengal Football Academy U15	Kolkata, India
IST

2 January 2025 2	Mohun Bagan U15	3–0	Bhawanipore FC U15	Kolkata, India
IST	Rajdip Pal, Amit Rajbangshi Raja Rajbangshi

6 January 2025 3	Mohun Bagan U15	3–1	Chowbaga High School U15	Kolkata, India
	Rohit Barman, Jay Shaiful Rajdip Pal

=== Final Round (Round 3) ===
Pos	Team	Pld	W	D	L	GF	GA	GD	Pts	Qualification	MBSG	BFA	EBFC	USC
1	Mohun Bagan	6	4	1	1	18	11	+7	13	Champions		4–1	3–0	3–2
2	Bengal Football Academy	6	4	1	1	17	10	+7	13		5–4		1–1	5–0
3	East Bengal	6	1	1	4	8	12	−4	4		1–2	1–2		5–2
4	United Sports Club	6	1	1	4	8	18	−10	4		2–2	0–3	2–0	

Updated to match(es) played on 22 January 2025. Source:

9 January 2025 1	United Sports Club	2–2	Mohun Bagan U15	India
10:30 IST		Report	Rajdip Pal x2	Stadium: Kalyani B3 Ground

11 January 2025 2	East Bengal	1–2	Mohun Bagan U15	India
11:00 IST		Report	Rajdeep Pal x2	Stadium: Kalyani B3 Ground

13 January 2025 3	Mohun Bagan U15	4–1	Bengal Football Academy	India
12:00 IST	Rajdip Pal Jayak Sanju	Report		Stadium: Kalyani B3 Ground

16 January 2025 4	Mohun Bagan U15	3–2	United Sports Club	India
08:30 IST	Rajdip	Report		Stadium: Kalyani B3 Ground

20 January 2025 5	Mohun Bagan U15	3–0	East Bengal	India
10:35 IST	Jayak 32'; Tanay 55'; Sanju 81'	Report		Stadium: Amal Dutta Stadium

22 January 2025 6	Bengal Football Academy	5–4	Mohun Bagan U15	India
12:40 IST		RFYS; YT	Rajdeep; Sanju; Jayak	Stadium: Amal Dutta Stadium

== U13 ==
=== Squads ===
Note: Flags indicate national team as defined under FIFA eligibility rules; some limited exceptions apply. Players may hold more than one non-FIFA nationality.

No.	Pos.	Nation	Player
1	GK	IND	Sayan Debnath
21	GK	IND	Hiranmoy Das
31	GK	IND	Rupam Biswas
2	DF	IND	Ishan Manna
3	DF	IND	Gourav Sil
4	DF	IND	Jishu Chakraborty
5	DF	IND	Srijan Koley
27	DF	IND	Ali Hussain
32	DF	IND	Souvik Sikdar
6	MF	IND	Nirab Roy
7	MF	IND	Kartick Hembram
8	MF	IND	Syed Bashir Anowar
11	MF	IND	Jiyon Hansda
12	MF	IND	Eshan Mondal
28	MF	IND	Lorence Kisku

No.	Pos.	Nation	Player
29	MF	IND	Bijoy Das
33	MF	IND	Ronny Karmakar
34	MF	IND	Subrato Mandi
42	MF	IND	Rupam Manna
45	MF	IND	SK Sakib
46	MF	IND	SK Sakibuddin
48	MF	IND	Bakibillah
49	MF	IND	Abhijit Hansda
9	FW	IND	Shagnik Kundu
10	FW	IND	Sidu Soren
30	FW	IND	Archisman Paul
35	FW	IND	Annubrata Baul Das
36	FW	IND	Raj Mudi
37	FW	IND	Sandip Roy

=== AIFF SUB Junior league ===
==== Group Stage ====
Pos	Team	Pld	W	D	L	GF	GA	GD	Pts	MBSG	EBFC	BFA	AUSA	BMSA	MSC
1	Mohun Bagan	10	7	1	2	36	14	+22	22		1–4	1–3	4–1	3–1	11–0
2	East Bengal	10	6	2	2	17	7	+10	20	0–1		0–0	3–1	1–0	3–1
3	Bengal Football Academy	10	5	4	1	32	6	+26	19	0–2	0–0		3–0	1–1	12–0
4	Adamas United Sports Academy	10	4	1	5	17	18	−1	13	1–4	3–0	1–3		3–1	6–0
5	Bidhannagar Municipal Sports Academy	10	2	4	4	17	14	+3	10	2–2	0–3	1–1	0–0		6–0
6	Mohammedan	10	0	0	10	3	63	−60	0	2–7	0–3	0–9	0–1	0–5	

9 February 2025 1	East Bengal U13	0–1	Mohun Bagan U13	Kolkata, India
10:30 IST		Report	Shagnik Kundu 08'	Stadium: BMSA Ground

12 February 2025 2	Mohun Bagan U13	11–0	Mohammedan U13	Kolkata, India
10:30 IST	Nirab 3', 9'; Kartick 12'; Raj 19', 29'; Sidu 22'; Sagnik 35'; Basir 41'; Anubrata 44'; Jiyon 60'; Archisman 69'	Report		Stadium: Bansberia Kishore Sangha Ground

15 February 2025 3	Bengal Football Academy	0–2	Mohun Bagan U13	Kolkata, India
11:00 IST		Report	Shagnik 3'; Kartick 54'	Stadium: Adamas University Sports Ground

18 February 2025 4	Bidhannagar Municipal Sports Academy	2–2	Mohun Bagan U13	Kolkata, India
14:30 IST		Report	Shagnik Kundu 14'; Raj Mudi 37'	Stadium: BMSA Ground

21 February 2025 5	Adamas United Sports Academy	1–4	Mohun Bagan U13	Kolkata, India
14:00 IST		Report	Gourab Sil 4'; Md Arman Ali 40' (o.g.); Nirab Roy 50'; Raj Mudi 52'	Stadium: Adamas University Sports Ground

24 February 2025 6	Mohun Bagan U13	3–1	Bidhannagar Municipal Sports Academy	Kolkata, India
10:30 IST	Shagnik Kundu 13', 33'; Raj Mudi 48'	Report		Stadium: Bansberia Kishore Sangha Ground

27 February 2025 7	Mohammedan U13	2–7	Mohun Bagan U13	West Bengal, India
14:00 IST		Report	Sidu Soren 14', 45', 70+4'; Nirab Roy 24'; Jiyon Hansda 35+1'; Raj Mudi 36', 41'	Stadium: Bansberia Kishore Sangha Ground

2 March 2025 8	Mohun Bagan U13	4–1	Adamas United Sports Academy	West Bengal, India
10:30 IST	Sidu Soren 17'; Shagnik 42', 55'; Raj Mudi 43'	Report		Stadium: Bansberia Kishore Sangha Ground

5 March 2025 9	Mohun Bagan U13	1–4	East Bengal U13	Kolkata, India
10:30 IST	Shagnik 40'	Report		Stadium: Bansberia Kishore Sangha Ground

8 March 2025 10	Mohun Bagan U13	1–3	Bengal Football Academy	West Bengal, India
10:30 IST	Shagnik Kundu 3'	Report		Stadium: Bansberia Kishore Sangha Ground

==== National Group Stage ====
Pos	Team	Pld	W	D	L	GF	GA	GD	Pts	F4C	FCM	MBSG	FCC
1	FOOTBALL 4 Change	3	3	0	0	10	3	+7	9				4–1
2	FC Madras	3	2	0	1	10	4	+6	6	0–1		3–2	
3	Mohun Bagan	3	1	0	2	7	10	−3	3	2–5			3–2
4	FC Corbett	3	0	0	3	4	14	−10	0		1–7		

14 May 2025 1	Mohun Bagan U13	2–5	FOOTBALL 4 Change	Tamil Nadu, India
07:00 IST	Nirab Roy 19'; Shagnik Kundu 31'; Jiyon Hansda (yellow card) 37'; Sayan Debnath (yellow card) 70+2'	Report	Letgoumang Haokip 3'; Mangminhao Vaiphei 5', 39'; Augustine Janggoumang Kipgen 10', 23'	Stadium: Ground 1

16 May 2025 2	FC Madras	3–2	Mohun Bagan U13	Tamil Nadu, India
16:00 IST	Kunchapu Nikhil Tej (yellow card) 7', (goal) 31'; Rithik Senthilkumar 18'; Mayengbam Tenison Singh 49'	Report	Nirab Roy 4'; Raj Mudi 24'; Jishu Chakraborty (yellow card) 27'; Kartick Hembram (yellow card) 53'	Stadium: Ground 1

18 May 2025 3	Mohun Bagan U13	3–2	Corbett FC	Tamil Nadu, India
07:00 IST	Sidu Soren 51'; Shagnik Kundu 60', 70+2'; Ali Hussain (yellow card) 66'; Jishu Chakraborty (yellow card) 70+4'	Report	Tanuj 9'; Gourav Sil 62' (o.g.)	Stadium: Ground 1

==== Top Goalscorers ====
As of 18 May 2025

Pos	Name	Group Stage	Nationals	Total
1	Shagnik Kundu	10	3	13
2	Raj Mudi	8	1	9
3	Nirab	4	2	6
3	Sidu	5	1	6
4	Kartick	2	0	2
4	Jiyon	2	0	2
5	Anubrata	1	0	1
5	Basir	1	0	1
5	Archisman	1	0	1
5	Gourab Sil	1	0	1
Own Goal(s)		1	0	1
Total		36	7	43

== Youth Friendlies ==
=== Chief Minister's Cup ===
2 September 2024 Chief Ministers Cup	Mohun Bagan	1–1 (3–2 p)	East Bengal	Lucknow, India
18:00 IST	Suhail Bhat 18'		72' Muhammed K. Ashique	Stadium: KD Singh Babu Stadium; Referee: Ashwin K.

=== Bhadreswar Gold Cup ===
4 January 2025 Semi-Finals	Mohun Bagan	1–0	Kalighat MS	Burdwan
14:00	Serto 70'

6 January 2025 Finals	Mohun Bagan	1–0	Mohammedan	Burdwan
14:00	Amandeep

=== U15 ===
22 April 2025 Junior League friendly	Mohun Bagan u15	5–2	Serampore Chittaranjan AC	Bansberia, India
18:00 IST	Rajdeep; Biswajit; Sandip			Stadium: Bansberia Kishore Sangha Ground

== Derbies ==
Competition	Record							
Competition	Pld	W	D	L	GF	GA	GD	Win %
Senior Team	2	2	0	0	3	0	+3	100.00
U23	2	1	0	1	2	3	−1	50.00
U21	3	1	1	1	2	2	+0	33.33
U17	2	1	1	0	1	0	+1	50.00
U15	4	4	0	0	12	4	+8	100.00
U13	2	1	0	1	2	4	−2	50.00
Total	15	10	2	3	22	13	+9	66.67

Last updated: 12 April 2025
Source: Competitions

=== Senior team ===
==== Durand Cup ====
18 August 2024 Match 3	Mohun Bagan	Cancelled	East Bengal	Kolkata, West Bengal
19:00 IST				Stadium: Vivekananda Yuba Bharati Krirangan
Note: The match was cancelled by the organising body on security grounds and both teams were awarded 1 point each.

==== Indian Super League ====
19 October 2024 5	East Bengal	0–2	Mohun Bagan	Kolkata, India
19:30 IST			Jamie Maclaren 42'; Dimi Petratos 89' (pen.)	Stadium: Vivekananda Yuba Bharati Krirangan; Attendance: 59,782; Man of the Match: Greg Stewart

11 January 2025 15	Mohun Bagan	1–0	East Bengal	Guwahati, India
19:30 IST	Jamie Maclaren 2'			Stadium: Indira Gandhi Athletic Stadium; Attendance: 2,567; Man of the Match: Jamie Maclaren

=== U23 ===
==== Calcutta Football League ====
13 July 2024 Match 3	Mohun Bagan SG U23	1–2	East Bengal U23	Kolkata, India
IST	Suhail 90+5'	Report	PV Vishnu 51'; Jesin TK 64'; Justin (red card) 77'	Stadium: Salt Lake Stadium

==== Chief Minister's Cup ====
2 September 2024 Chief Ministers Cup	Mohun Bagan SG U23	1–1 (3–2 p)	East Bengal U23	Lucknow, India
18:00 IST	Suhail Bhat 18'		72' Muhammed K. Ashique	Stadium: KD Singh Babu Stadium; Referee: Ashwin K.

=== RFDL Youth League ===
==== Regional Qualifiers ====
29 January 2025 5	East Bengal U21	0–0	Mohun Bagan U21	India
14:30 IST

==== Zonal Round ====
10 February 2025 2	Mohun Bagan U21	1–0	East Bengal U21	India
14:30 IST	Tongsin			Stadium: Naihati Stadium

18 February 2025 4	East Bengal U21	2–1	Mohun Bagan U21	India
14:30 IST	Aromal 34'; Shyamal 72'		Pasang 76'	Stadium: Barrackpore Stadium

=== U17 ===
==== AIFF Indian Youth League ====
15 January 2025 4	Mohun Bagan U17	1–0	East Bengal U17	Kolkata, India
10:30 IST	Aditya Mondal 79'			Stadium: Mohun Bagan Ground

20 January 2025 6	East Bengal U17	0–0	Mohun Bagan U17	Kolkata, India
10:30 IST				Stadium: East Bengal Ground

=== U15 ===
==== Reliance Foundation Youth Sports Final Round(Round 3) ====
11 January 2025 2	East Bengal U15	1–2	Mohun Bagan U15	India
IST			Rajdeep Pal x2

20 January 2025 5	Mohun Bagan U15	3–0	East Bengal U15	India
IST	Jayak 32' Tanay 55' Sanju 81'

==== AIFF Junior League ====
8 February 2025 1	East Bengal U15	2–4	Mohun Bagan U15	Kolkata, India
14:00 IST		Report	Rajdeep 25', 42', 60'; Rohit 47'	Stadium: Kalyani Stadium

4 March 2025 9	Mohun Bagan U15	3–1	East Bengal U15	Kolkata, India
10:30 IST	Rohit Barman 45', 56'; Akash SK 88'	Report		Stadium: Bansberia Kishore Sangha Ground

=== U13 ===
==== AIFF SUB Junior League ====
9 February 2025 1	East Bengal U13	0–1	Mohun Bagan U13	Kolkata, India
10:30 IST		Report	Shagnik Kundu 08'	Stadium: BMSA Ground

5 March 2025 9	Mohun Bagan U13	1–4	East Bengal U13	Kolkata, India
10:30 IST	Shagnik 40'	Report		Stadium: Bansberia Kishore Sangha Ground
