= 2024 Durand Cup =

133rd edition of the Durand Cup

IndianOil Durand Cup
- Logo of the 133rd Durand Cup, 2024

Tournament details
- Country: India
- Venue(s): Kolkata, Jamshedpur, Shillong and Kokrajhar
- Dates: 27 July – 31 August
- Teams: 24

Final positions
- Champions: NorthEast United (1st title)
- Runners-up: Mohun Bagan

Tournament statistics
- Matches played: 43
- Goals scored: 144 (3.35 per match)
- Attendance: 272,212 (6,331 per match)
- Top goal scorer: (Morocco) Noah Sadaoui (Kerala Blasters) (6 goals)

The 2024 Durand Cup (also known as IndianOil Durand Cup due to sponsorship ties with the Indian Oil Corporation) was the 133rd edition of Durand Cup, the oldest football tournament in Asia, and the third edition since it was supported by the Asian Football Confederation. The tournament is hosted by the Durand Football Tournament Society in co-operation with the AIFF, Eastern Command of the Indian Armed Forces and the Government of West Bengal, supported by the governments Assam and Meghalaya.

This is the third season of the tournament wherein all the clubs in the top tier Indian Super League have been mandated to participate (but later Hyderabad FC withdrew), along with I-League, I-League 2 (Hyderabad FC was replaced by Meghalaya State League club Rangdajied United), I-League 3 and state leagues clubs, and guest invitees representing armed forces.

Mohun Bagan were the defending champions, having defeated the East Bengal in the 2023 final.

The 2024 Durand Cup final saw NorthEast United beat the defending champions Mohun Bagan to win this tournament and the club's first ever trophy in their history.

== Teams ==
Locations of the participating teams

Team	Head coach	Captain	Location
Indian Super League teams
Bengaluru	(Spain) Gerard Zaragoza	(India) Sunil Chhetri	Bengaluru, Karnataka
East Bengal	(Spain) Carles Cuadrat	(Spain) Saúl Crespo	Kolkata, West Bengal
Chennaiyin	(India) Noel Wilson	(India) Bikash Yumnam	Chennai, Tamil Nadu
Goa	(India) Israil Gurung	(India) Leander D'Cunha	Margao, Goa
Jamshedpur	(India) Khalid Jamil	(India) Seiminlen Doungel	Jamshedpur, Jharkhand
Kerala Blasters	(Sweden) Mikael Stahre	(Uruguay) Adrián Luna	Kochi, Kerala
Mohammedan	(Uganda) Hakim Ssengendo	(India) Thokchom James Singh	Kolkata, West Bengal
Mohun Bagan	(Spain) José Francisco Molina	(India) Subhasish Bose	Kolkata, West Bengal
Mumbai City	(India) Mohan Dass	(India) Nikhil Shinde	Mumbai, Maharashtra
NorthEast United	(Spain) Juan Pedro Benali	(Morocco) Mohammed Ali Bemammer	Guwahati, Assam
Odisha	(India) Amit Rana	(India) Lalliansanga Renthlei	Bhubaneswar, Odisha
Punjab	(Greece) Panagiotis Dilmperis	(Slovenia) Luka Majcen	Mohali, Punjab
I-League teams
Inter Kashi	(India) Arata Izumi	(India) Sumeet Passi	Varanasi, Uttar Pradesh
Shillong Lajong	(Spain) José Hevia	(India) Hardy Nongbri	Shillong, Meghalaya
I-League 3 teams
Downtown Heroes	(India) Hilal Rasool Parray	(Morocco) Rédah Atassi	Srinagar, Jammu & Kashmir
State League teams
Bodoland	(India) Khlain Syiemlieh	(India) Danswrang Basumatary	Kokrajhar, Assam
Rangdajied United	(India) Aibanjop Shadap	(India) Balamlynti Khongjee	Shillong, Meghalaya
Indian Armed Forces teams
Assam Rifles	(India) Vikash Panthi	(India) David Lalrinchhana	Dispur, Assam
BSF	(India) Gurjit Singh Atwal	(India) Md. Aasif	Jalandhar, Punjab
CISF Protectors	(India) Ajit Kumar	(India) Rahul Aswal	New Delhi, Delhi
Indian Air Force	(India) Priya Darshan	(India) Ashok Kumar	New Delhi, Delhi
Indian Army	(India) Manish Wahi	(India) Bhabindra Malla Thakuri	New Delhi, Delhi
Indian Navy	(India) Raman Rai	(India) Novin Gurung	Kochi, Kerala
Guest invitees/Foreign armed forces teams
(Nepal) Tribhuvan Army	(Nepal) Meghraj KC	(Nepal) Bharat Khawas	Kathmandu, Nepal

== Venues ==
Kolkata		Jamshedpur
Salt Lake Stadium	Kishore Bharati Krirangan	JRD Tata Sports Complex
Capacity: 68,000	Capacity: 12,000	Capacity: 24,424
Shillong	Kokrajhar	
Jawaharlal Nehru Stadium	SAI Stadium	
Capacity: 17,500	Capacity: 10,000	

== Broadcasting ==
Sony Sports Network have acquired the broadcasting rights starting from 2023. The 2024 edition is being live streamed on the network's OTT platform SonyLIV as well as TV channels Sony Ten 2 and Sony Ten 2 HD.

== Group stage ==
=== Group A ===
Pos	Team	Pld	W	D	L	GF	GA	GD	Pts	Qualification	MBG	EAB	DTH	IAF
1	Mohun Bagan (H)	3	2	1	0	7	0	+7	7	Advanced to knockout stage		CAN (Note: The match was cancelled by the organising body on security grounds and both teams were awarded 1 point each.)	1–0	6–0
2	East Bengal (H)	3	2	1	0	6	2	+4	7	Advanced to knockout stage			3–1	3–1
3	Downtown Heroes	3	1	0	2	3	4	−1	3					
4	Indian Air Force	3	0	0	3	1	11	−10	0				0–2	

Source: Twitter
Rules for classification: Group stage tiebreakers
(H) Hosts

=== Group B ===
Pos	Team	Pld	W	D	L	GF	GA	GD	Pts	Qualification	BEN	MSC	IKA	INV
1	Bengaluru	3	3	0	0	10	2	+8	9	Advanced to knockout stage			3–0	4–0
2	Mohammedan (H)	3	1	1	1	4	4	0	4		2–3		1–1	1–0
3	Inter Kashi	3	1	1	1	3	5	−2	4					
4	Indian Navy	3	0	0	3	1	7	−6	0				1–2	

Source: Twitter
Rules for classification: Group stage tiebreakers
(H) Hosts

=== Group C ===
Pos	Team	Pld	W	D	L	GF	GA	GD	Pts	Qualification	KER	PUN	CIS	MCI
1	Kerala Blasters	3	2	1	0	16	1	+15	7	Advanced to knockout stage		1–1	7–0	
2	Punjab	3	2	1	0	7	1	+6	7	Advanced to knockout stage				3–0
3	CISF Protectors	3	1	0	2	2	10	−8	3			0–3		
4	Mumbai City	3	0	0	3	0	13	−13	0		0–8		0–2	

Source: Twitter
Rules for classification: Group stage tiebreakers

=== Group D ===
Pos	Team	Pld	W	D	L	GF	GA	GD	Pts	Qualification	ARM	JAM	CHN	ASR
1	Army Red	3	3	0	0	7	2	+5	9	Advanced to knockout stage				3–0
2	Jamshedpur (H)	3	2	0	1	7	4	+3	6		2–3		2–1	3–0
3	Chennaiyin	3	1	0	2	3	4	−1	3		0–1			2–1
4	Assam Rifles	3	0	0	3	1	8	−7	0					

Source: Twitter
Rules for classification: Group stage tiebreakers
(H) Hosts

=== Group E ===
Pos	Team	Pld	W	D	L	GF	GA	GD	Pts	Qualification	NEU	BDO	OFC	BSF
1	NorthEast United	3	3	0	0	11	1	+10	9	Advanced to knockout stage			5–1	4–0
2	Bodoland (H)	3	2	0	1	6	5	+1	6		0–2		2–0	4–3
3	Odisha	3	1	0	2	6	7	−1	3					5–0
4	BSF	3	0	0	3	3	13	−10	0					

Source: Twitter
Rules for classification: Group stage tiebreakers
(H) Hosts

=== Group F ===
Pos	Team	Pld	W	D	L	GF	GA	GD	Pts	Qualification	SHI	GOA	(Nepal) TRI	RDU
1	Shillong Lajong (H)	3	2	1	0	4	1	+3	7	Advanced to knockout stage			1–0	2–0
2	Goa	3	2	1	0	7	5	+2	7		1–1		2–1	4–3
3	(Nepal) Tribhuvan Army	3	1	0	2	5	3	+2	3					
4	Rangdajied United (H)	3	0	0	3	3	10	−7	0				0–2	

Source: Twitter
Rules for classification: Group stage tiebreakers
(H) Hosts

=== Ranking of second-placed teams ===
Pos	Grp	Team	Pld	W	D	L	GF	GA	GD	Pts	Qualification
1	C	Punjab	3	2	1	0	7	1	+6	7	Advanced to knockout stage
2	A	East Bengal	3	2	1	0	6	2	+4	7	Advanced to knockout stage
3	F	Goa	3	2	1	0	7	5	+2	7	
4	D	Jamshedpur	3	2	0	1	7	4	+3	6	
5	E	Bodoland	3	2	0	1	6	5	+1	6	
6	B	Mohammedan	3	1	1	1	4	4	0	4	

Source: Twitter

== Knockout stage ==
=== Qualified teams ===
Group	Winners (6)
A	Mohun Bagan
B	Bengaluru
C	Kerala Blasters
D	Indian Army
E	NorthEast United
F	Shillong Lajong

Group	Best second-placed teams (2)
C	Punjab
A	East Bengal

In the knockout stage matches (quarter-finals, semi-finals, and final), no extra time would be played and for any draws, matches would be directly decided by a penalty shootout.

=== Bracket ===
Quarter-finals
21 August – Kokrajhar
NorthEast United	2
Indian Army	0
21 August – Shillong
Shillong Lajong	2
East Bengal	1
23 August – Jamshedpur
Mohun Bagan	3(6)
Punjab	3(5)
23 August – Kolkata
Bengaluru	1
Kerala Blasters	0

Semi-finals
26 August – Shillong
NorthEast United	3
Shillong Lajong	0
27 August – Kolkata
Mohun Bagan	2(4)
Bengaluru	2(3)

Final
31 August – Kolkata
NorthEast United	2(4)
Mohun Bagan	2(3)

=== Quarter-finals ===
21 August 2024
16:00

NorthEast United	2–0	Indian Army
Néstor 54'; Guillermo 73'	Report

SAI Stadium, Kokrajhar
Attendance: 7,290
Referee: Surojit Das

21 August 2024
19:00

Shillong Lajong	2–1	East Bengal
Marcos 8'; Figo 84'	Report	Nandha 77'

Jawaharlal Nehru Stadium, Shillong
Attendance: 14,988
Referee: K Ramdasan

23 August 2024
16:00

Mohun Bagan	v	Punjab
Suhail 45'; Manvir 48'; Cummings 79'	Report	Majcen 17'; Mrzljak 62'; E. Vidal 71'
Penalties
Cummings (penalty missed); Manvir (penalty scored); Liston (penalty scored); Petratos (penalty scored); Stewart (penalty scored); Subhasish (penalty scored); Aldred (penalty scored)	6–5	(penalty scored) Vinit; (penalty scored) E. Vidal; (penalty scored) Bakenga; (penalty scored) Filip; (penalty missed) Novoselec; (penalty scored) Melroy; (penalty missed) Denechandra

JRD Tata Sports Complex, Jamshedpur
Attendance: 3,759
Referee: Mrutyunjay L Amatya

23 August 2024
19:00

Bengaluru	1-0	Kerala Blasters
Diaz 90+4'	Report

Salt Lake Stadium, Kolkata
Attendance: 638
Referee: Aditya Purkayastha

=== Semi-finals ===
26 August 2024
17:30

NorthEast United	3–0	Shillong Lajong
Thoi Singh 13'; Ajaraie 32'; Parthib 90+3'	Report

Jawaharlal Nehru Stadium, Shillong
Attendance: 15,915
Referee: Crystal John

27 August 2024
17:30

Mohun Bagan	2–2	Bengaluru
Petratos 68' (pen.); Thapa 84'	Report	Chhetri 43' (pen.); Venkatesh 51'
Penalties
Cummings (penalty scored); Manvir (penalty scored); Colaco (penalty scored); Petratos (penalty scored); Stewart (penalty missed)	4–3	(penalty scored) Méndez; (penalty scored) Bheke; (penalty scored) Pedro; (penalty missed) Narzary; (penalty missed) Jovanović

Salt Lake Stadium, Kolkata
Attendance: 18,342
Referee: Venkatesh R

=== Final ===
31 August 2024
17:30

Mohun Bagan	2–2	NorthEast United
Cummings 11' (pen.); Sahal 45+5'	Report	Ajaraie 55'; Guillermo 58'
Penalties
Cummings (penalty scored); Manvir (penalty scored); Colaco (penalty missed); Petratos (penalty scored); Subhasish (penalty missed)	3–4	Guillermo (penalty scored); Zabaco (penalty scored); Parthib (penalty scored); Ajaraie (penalty scored)

Salt Lake Stadium, Kolkata
Attendance: 52,391
Referee: Harish Kundu

== Season statistics ==
As of 31 August 2024

=== Top scorers ===
#	Golden Boot Winner

Rank	Player	Team	Goals
1	(Morocco) Noah Sadaoui ^{#}	Kerala Blasters	6
2	(Spain) Guillermo Fernández	NorthEast United	5
3	(Ghana) Kwame Peprah	Kerala Blasters	4
3	(India) Jithin M. S.	NorthEast United	4
3	(Slovenia) Luka Majcen	Punjab	4
3	(Australia) Jason Cummings	Mohun Bagan	4
7	(Morocco) Alaeddine Ajaraie	NorthEast United	3
7	(Argentina) Jorge Pereyra Diaz	Bengaluru	3
7	(India) Sunil Chhetri	Bengaluru	3
10	(Croatia) Filip Mrzljak	Punjab	2
10	(Norway) Mushaga Bakenga	Punjab	2
10	(Serbia) Nikola Stojanović	Inter Kashi	2
10	(Spain) Saúl Crespo	East Bengal	2
10	(Spain) Javier Siverio	Jamshedpur	2
10	(India) Anirudh Thapa	Mohun Bagan	2
10	(India) Mohammed Aimen	Kerala Blasters	2
10	(India) Ishan Pandita	Kerala Blasters	2
10	(India) Mohammed Sanan	Jamshedpur	2
10	(India) Suhail Bhat	Mohun Bagan	2
10	(Nepal) Gillespye Jung Karki	Tribhuwan Army	2
10	(India) Givson Singh	Odisha	2
10	(Liberia) Darius Snorton Perwood	Downtown Heroes	2
10	(Brazil) Marcos Rudwere	Shillong Lajong	2
10	(India) Huidrom Thoi Singh	NorthEast United	2
10	(India) Vinith Venkatesh	Bengaluru	2
10	(India) Lalthangliana	Goa	2
10	(India) Alan Thapa	Indian Army	2
10	(India) Jwngbla Brahma	Bodoland	2
10	(India) Kishori	BSF	2
10	(India) Devendra Dhaku Murgaokar	Goa	2

=== Hat-tricks ===
Sl No.	Player	For	Against	Result	Date
1	(Morocco) Noah Sadaoui	Kerala Blasters	Mumbai City	0–8	01 August 2024
2	(Ghana) Kwame Peprah	Kerala Blasters	Mumbai City	0–8	01 August 2024
3	(Morocco) Noah Sadaoui	Kerala Blasters	CISF Protectors	7–0	10 August 2024

=== Clean sheets ===
As of 31 August 2024

#	Golden Glove Winner

Rank	Player	Club	Clean sheets
1	(India) Gurmeet Singh ^{#}	NorthEast United	3
1	(India) Gurpreet Singh Sandhu	Bengaluru	3
3	(India) Som Kumar (Note: Played only one half against CISF Protectors)	Kerala Blasters	2
3	(India) Bhabindra Malla Thakuri	Indian Army	2
3	(India) Ravi Kumar	Punjab	2
6	(India) Syed Zahid	Mohun Bagan	1
6	(India) Albino Gomes	Jamshedpur	1
6	(India) Manas Dubey	Shillong Lajong	1
6	(India) Umaid Hussain	Downtown Heroes	1
6	(India) Niraj Kumar	Odisha	1
6	(India) Raj Kumar Mahato	CISF Protectors	1
6	(India) Daoga Brahma	Bodoland	1
6	(India) Dheeraj Singh	Mohun Bagan	1
6	(India) Vishal Kaith	Mohun Bagan	1
6	(India) Vishnu VK	Indian Navy	1
6	(India) Neithovilie Chalieu	Shillong Lajong	1
6	(India) Dipesh Chauhan	NorthEast United	1
6	(India) Nora Fernandes	Kerala Blasters	1
6	(Nepal) Bikesh Kuthu	Tribhuwan Army	1
6	(India) Nikhil Deka	Mohammedan	1

== Awards ==
=== Prize money ===
The total pool of prize money for the 2024 edition is ₹1.05 crore (US$110,000).

Prize	Recipient	Amount
Champions	NorthEast United	₹60 lakh (US$62,000)
Runner-up	Mohun Bagan	₹30 lakh (US$31,000)
Golden glove	Gurmeet Singh (Northeast United FC)	₹5 lakh (US$5,200)
Golden boot	Noah Sadaoui (Kerala Blasters FC)	₹5 lakh (US$5,200)
Golden ball	Jithin M. S. (Northeast United FC)	₹5 lakh (US$5,200)

=== Man of the match ===
Match	Man of the Match		Match	Man of the match		Match	Man of the match	
Match	Player	Team	Match	Player	Team	Match	Player	Team
Match 1	(India) Suhail Bhat	Mohun Bagan	Match 16	(India) Chandra Kumar Karketta	CISF Protectors	Match 31	(India) Sujit Singh	Mohammedan
Match 2	(India) Imran Khan	Jamshedpur	Match 17	(India) Vellington Fernandes	Goa	Match 32	(Nepal) Gillespye Jung Karki	(Nepal) Tribhuvan Army
Match 3	(Japan) Anand Usuda	Inter Kashi	Match 18	(India) Wanboklang Lyngkhoi	Bodoland	Match 33	(Nepal) Alan Thapa	Indian Army
Match 4	(France) Madih Talal	East Bengal	Match 19	(India) Vinith Venkatesh	Bengaluru	Match 34	(India) Jithin M. S.	NorthEast United
Match 5	(India) Jithin M. S.	NorthEast United	Match 20	(India) Sunil B	Indian Army	Match 35	(India) Balkaran Singh	Goa
Match 6	(Slovenia) Luka Majcen	Punjab	Match 21	(France) Madih Talal	East Bengal	Match 36	Cancelled	
Match 7	(India) Liton Shil	Indian Army	Match 22	(Australia) Jason Cummings	Mohun Bagan	Match 37	(Spain) Néstor Albiach	NorthEast United
Match 8	(India) Rahul Bheke	Bengaluru	Match 23	(India) Leander D'Cunha	Goa	Match 38	(India) Manas Dubey	Shillong Lajong
Match 9	(Morocco) Noah Sadaoui	Kerala Blasters	Match 24	(Serbia) Nikola Stojanović	Inter Kashi	Match 39	(Argentina) Ezequiel Vidal	Punjab
Match 10	(India) Wadajied Ryngkhlem	Shillong Lajong	Match 25	(Spain) Guillermo Fernández	NorthEast United	Match 40	(Argentina) Pereyra Díaz	Bengaluru
Match 11	(Liberia) Darius Snorton Perwood	Downtown Heroes	Match 26	(India) Hardy Nongbri	Shillong Lajong	Match 41	(India) Thoi Singh	NorthEast United
Match 12	(India) Givson Singh	Odisha	Match 27	(Morocco) Noah Sadaoui	Kerala Blasters	Match 42	(India) Vishal Kaith	Mohun Bagan
Match 13	(Spain) Alberto Noguera	Bengaluru	Match 28	(India) Vinit Rai	Punjab	Match 43	(India) Gurmeet Singh	NorthEast United
Match 14	(India) Freddy Lallawmawma	Kerala Blasters	Match 29	(India) Shobhan Dev Biswas	Assam Rifles			
Match 15	(India) Imran Khan	Jamshedpur	Match 30	(India) Jwngbla Brahma	Bodoland			

== See also ==
- Men
  - 2024–25 Indian Super League (Tier I)
  - 2024–25 I-League (Tier II)
  - 2024–25 I-League 2 (Tier III)
  - 2024–25 I-League 3 (Tier IV)
  - 2024–25 Indian State Leagues (Tier V)
  - 2025 Super Cup (April)
- Women
  - 2024–25 Indian Women's League
  - 2024–25 Indian Women's League 2
