= 2024 Durand Cup group stage =

Group stage of 2024 Durand Cup

Tournament details
- Country: India
- Teams: 24

The 2024 IndianOil Durand Cup group stage will be played from July to 31 August 2024. A total of 24 teams, consisting of 13 ISL clubs, 2 I-League clubs, 2 regional league team, 6 Indian Armed Forces teams and 1 Foreign armed force teams, compete in the group stage to decide the 8 places in the knockout stage.

== Format ==
In the group stage, each group is played on a single round-robin format. The table-toppers from each group & two best second-placed teams from group stage advances to the knockout stage.

=== Tiebreakers ===
The teams are ranked according to points (3 points for a win, 1 point for a draw, 0 points for a loss). If tied on points, tiebreakers are applied in the following order:

1. Points in head-to-head matches among tied teams;
2. Goal difference in head-to-head matches among tied teams;
3. Goals scored in head-to-head matches among tied teams;
4. If more than two teams are tied, and after applying all head-to-head criteria above, a subset of teams are still tied, all head-to-head criteria above are reapplied exclusively to this subset of teams;
5. Goal difference in all group matches;
6. Goals scored in all group matches;
7. Drawing of lots.

== Centralised venues ==
On 4 July, Durand Cup Organising Committee announced that the tournament would be played across more than one city—4 cities—Kolkata, Jamshedpur, Shillong and Kokrajhar. The six groups were assigned one or more than one centralised venue, with five out of the six groups having at least one of the teams in the group based from the host city, except Group C.

- Group A: Kolkata, West Bengal (Vivekananda Yuba Bharati Krirangan and Kishore Bharati Krirangan)
- Group B: Kolkata, West Bengal (Vivekananda Yuba Bharati Krirangan and Kishore Bharati Krirangan)
- Group C: Kolkata, West Bengal (Vivekananda Yuba Bharati Krirangan and Kishore Bharati Krirangan)
- Group D: Jamshedpur, Jharkhand (JRD Tata Sports Complex)
- Group E: Kokrajhar, Assam (SAI Stadium)
- Group F: Shillong, Meghalaya (Jawaharlal Nehru Stadium)

== Groups ==
=== Group A ===
Pos	Team	Pld	W	D	L	GF	GA	GD	Pts	Qualification	MBG	EAB	DTH	IAF
1	Mohun Bagan (H)	3	2	1	0	7	0	+7	7	Advanced to knockout stage		CAN (Note: The match was cancelled by the organising body on security grounds and both teams were awarded 1 point each.)	1–0	6–0
2	East Bengal (H)	3	2	1	0	6	2	+4	7	Advanced to knockout stage			3–1	3–1
3	Downtown Heroes	3	1	0	2	3	4	−1	3					
4	Indian Air Force	3	0	0	3	1	11	−10	0				0–2	

Source: Twitter
Rules for classification: Group stage tiebreakers
(H) Hosts

==== Matches ====
27 July 2024	Mohun Bagan	1–0	Downtown Heroes	Kolkata, West Bengal
16:00 IST	Bhat 73'	Report		Stadium: Vivekananda Yuba Bharati Krirangan; Attendance: 8,356; Referee: Crystal John; Man of the Match: Suhail Bhat (Mohun Bagan)

29 July 2024	Indian Air Force	1–3	East Bengal	Kolkata, West Bengal
19:00 IST	Somananda 18'	Report	David 43'; Diamantakos 61'; Crespo 68'	Stadium: Vivekananda Yuba Bharati Krirangan; Attendance: 9,469; Referee: Aditya Purkayastha; Man of the Match: Madih Talal (East Bengal)

2 August 2024	Indian Air Force	0–2	Downtown Heroes	Kolkata, West Bengal
19:00 IST		Report	Snorton 29', 84'	Stadium: Vivekananda Yuba Bharati Krirangan; Attendance: 131; Referee: Ashish Tiwari; Man of the Match: Darius Snorton Perwood (Downtown Heroes)

7 August 2024	East Bengal	3–1	Downtown Heroes	Kolkata, West Bengal
19:00 IST	Talal 23'; Crespo 36'; Jesin 90+3'	Report	Parray 28'	Stadium: Kishore Bharati Krirangan; Attendance: 8,245; Referee: Williams Joy Koshy; Man of the Match: Madih Talal (East Bengal)

8 August 2024	Mohun Bagan	6–0	Indian Air Force	Kolkata, West Bengal
16:00 IST	Cummings 4'; Aldred 10'; Liston 38'; Thapa 65'; Cummings 76'; Stewart 90+1'	Report		Stadium: Vivekananda Yuba Bharati Krirangan; Attendance: 6,925; Referee: Aditya Purkayastha; Man of the Match: Jason Cummings (Mohun Bagan)

18 August 2024	Mohun Bagan	Cancelled	East Bengal	Kolkata, West Bengal
19:00 IST		Report		Stadium: Vivekananda Yuba Bharati Krirangan; Referee: Harish Kundu

=== Group B ===
Pos	Team	Pld	W	D	L	GF	GA	GD	Pts	Qualification	BEN	MSC	IKA	INV
1	Bengaluru	3	3	0	0	10	2	+8	9	Advanced to knockout stage			3–0	4–0
2	Mohammedan (H)	3	1	1	1	4	4	0	4		2–3		1–1	1–0
3	Inter Kashi	3	1	1	1	3	5	−2	4					
4	Indian Navy	3	0	0	3	1	7	−6	0				1–2	

Source: Twitter
Rules for classification: Group stage tiebreakers
(H) Hosts

==== Matches ====
28 July 2024	Mohammedan	1–1	Inter Kashi	Kolkata, West Bengal
19:00 IST	Ashley 66'	Report	Nikola 39'	Stadium: Kishore Bharati Krirangan; Attendance: 4,829; Referee: Senthil Nathan Sekaran; Man of the Match: Anand Usuda (Inter Kashi)

31 July 2024	Bengaluru	4–0	Indian Navy	Kolkata, West Bengal
19:00 IST	Bheke 11'; Chhetri 42' (pen.); Díaz 80', 90+1'	Report		Stadium: Vivekananda Yuba Bharati Krirangan; Attendance: 184; Referee: Lakshay; Man of the Match: Rahul Bheke (Bengaluru)

3 August 2024	Bengaluru	3–0	Inter Kashi	Kolkata, West Bengal
19:00 IST	Édgar 17' (pen.); Ripoll 77'; Chhetri 82'	Report		Stadium: Kishore Bharati Krirangan; Attendance: 435; Referee: Crystal John; Man of the Match: Alberto Noguera Ripoll (Bengaluru FC)

6 August 2024	Mohammedan	2–3	Bengaluru	Kolkata, West Bengal
19:00 IST	Israfil 77'; Mahitosh 90+3'	Report	Jovanović 7'; Dipu 22' (a.g.); Vinith 60'	Stadium: Vivekananda Yuba Bharati Krirangan; Attendance: 4,143; Referee: Venkatesh R Man of the Match: Vinith Venkatesh (Bengaluru FC)

9 August 2024	Indian Navy	1–2	Inter Kashi	Kolkata, West Bengal
16:00 IST	Novin 53'	Report	Nikola 65'; Tomba 66'	Stadium: Kishore Bharati Krirangan; Attendance: 112; Referee: Ashish Tiwari; Man of the Match: Nikola Stojanović (Inter Kashi)

13 August 2024	Mohammedan	1–0	Indian Navy	Kolkata, West Bengal
16:00 IST	Sujit 24'	Report		Stadium: Kishore Bharati Krirangan; Attendance: 1,236; Referee: Aditya Purkayastha; Man of the Match: Sujit Singh (Mohammedan)

=== Group C ===
Pos	Team	Pld	W	D	L	GF	GA	GD	Pts	Qualification	KER	PUN	CIS	MCI
1	Kerala Blasters	3	2	1	0	16	1	+15	7	Advanced to knockout stage		1–1	7–0	
2	Punjab	3	2	1	0	7	1	+6	7	Advanced to knockout stage				3–0
3	CISF Protectors	3	1	0	2	2	10	−8	3			0–3		
4	Mumbai City	3	0	0	3	0	13	−13	0		0–8		0–2	

Source: Twitter
Rules for classification: Group stage tiebreakers

==== Matches ====
30 July 2024	CISF Protectors	0–3	Punjab	Kolkata, West Bengal
19:00 IST		Report	Majcen 29', 58'; Vinit Rai 76'	Stadium: Kishore Bharati Krirangan; Attendance: 172; Referee: Williams Joy Koshy; Man of the Match: Luka Majcen

1 August 2024	Mumbai City	0–8	Kerala Blasters	Kolkata, West Bengal
19:00 IST		Report	Sadaoui 32', 50', 76'; Peprah 39', 45', 53'; Pandita 86', 87'	Stadium: Kishore Bharati Krirangan; Attendance: 145; Referee: Venkatesh R Man of the Match: Noah Sadaoui (Kerala Blasters)

4 August 2024	Kerala Blasters	1–1	Punjab	Kolkata, West Bengal
16:00 IST	Aimen 56'	Report	Majcen 45+2'	Stadium: Vivekananda Yuba Bharati Krirangan; Attendance: 351; Referee: Senthil Nathan Sekaran; Man of the Match: Freddy Lallawmawma (Kerala Blasters)

5 August 2024	Mumbai City	0–2	CISF Protectors	Kolkata, West Bengal
16:00 IST		Report	Santosh Kumar 3'; Sahil Kumar 90+7'	Stadium: Kishore Bharati Krirangan; Attendance: 121; Referee: Lakshay; Man of the Match: Chandra Kumar Karketta (CISF Protectors)

10 August 2024	Kerala Blasters	7–0	CISF Protectors	Kolkata, West Bengal
19:00 IST	Peprah 6'; Sadaoui 9', 20', 89'; Aimen 16'; Naocha 25'; Azhar 16'	Report		Stadium: Vivekananda Yuba Bharati Krirangan; Attendance: 346; Referee: Crystal John; Man of the Match: Noah Sadaoui (Kerala Blasters)

11 August 2024	Punjab	3–0	Mumbai City	Kolkata, West Bengal
16:00 IST	Bakenga 62', 90+8' (pen.); Mrzljak 90+2'	Report		Stadium: Kishore Bharati Krirangan; Attendance: 212; Referee: Senthil Nathan Sekaran; Man of the Match: Vinit Rai (Punjab FC)

=== Group D ===
Pos	Team	Pld	W	D	L	GF	GA	GD	Pts	Qualification	ARM	JAM	CHN	ASR
1	Army Red	3	3	0	0	7	2	+5	9	Advanced to knockout stage				3–0
2	Jamshedpur (H)	3	2	0	1	7	4	+3	6		2–3		2–1	3–0
3	Chennaiyin	3	1	0	2	3	4	−1	3		0–1			2–1
4	Assam Rifles	3	0	0	3	1	8	−7	0					

Source: Twitter
Rules for classification: Group stage tiebreakers
(H) Hosts

==== Matches ====
28 July 2024	Jamshedpur	3–0	Assam Rifles	Jamshedpur, Jharkhand
16:00 IST	Mohammed Sanan 45+2', 68'; Imran 86'	Report		Stadium: JRD Tata Sports Complex; Attendance: 14,217; Referee: Harish kundu Man of the Match: Mohammed Sanan K (Jamshedpur FC)

31 July 2024	Chennaiyin	0–1	Army Red	Jamshedpur, Jharkhand
16:00 IST		Report	Liton Shil 42'	Stadium: JRD Tata Sports Complex; Attendance: 2,042; Referee: Harish Kundu; Man of the Match: Liton Shil (Indian Army)

4 August 2024	Jamshedpur	2–1	Chennaiyin	Jamshedpur, Jharkhand
19:00 IST	Wungngayam 32'; Murray 65'	Report	Barretto 90+2'	Stadium: JRD Tata Sports Complex; Attendance: 6,137; Referee: Mrutyunjay L Amatya; Man of the Match: Imran (Jamshedpur FC)

7 August 2024	Army Red	3–0	Assam Rifles	Jamshedpur, Jharkhand
16:00 IST	Alan 7'; Pardeep Singh 68' (pen.); Sunil 90'	Report		Stadium: JRD Tata Sports Complex; Attendance: 1,287; Referee: Jatinder Singh; Man of the Match: Sunil B (Indian Army)

11 August 2024	Chennaiyin	2–1	Assam Rifles	Jamshedpur, Jharkhand
19:00 IST	Jesuraj 89'; Praful Kumar 90+6'	Report	Jefferson Nongrud 76'	Stadium: JRD Tata Sports Complex; Attendance: 1012; Referee: Harish Kundu; Man of the Match: Shobhan Dev Biswas (Assam Rifles)

14 August 2024	Jamshedpur	2–3	Army Red	Jamshedpur, Jharkhand
19:00 IST	Siverio 41' (pen.), 45+3'	Report	Rahul 70'; Alan Thapa 77'; Bikash Thapa 83'	Stadium: JRD Tata Sports Complex; Attendance: 7,828; Referee: Jatinder Singh; Man of the Match: Alan Thapa (Army Red)

=== Group E ===
Pos	Team	Pld	W	D	L	GF	GA	GD	Pts	Qualification	NEU	BDO	OFC	BSF
1	NorthEast United	3	3	0	0	11	1	+10	9	Advanced to knockout stage			5–1	4–0
2	Bodoland (H)	3	2	0	1	6	5	+1	6		0–2		2–0	4–3
3	Odisha	3	1	0	2	6	7	−1	3					5–0
4	BSF	3	0	0	3	3	13	−10	0					

Source: Twitter
Rules for classification: Group stage tiebreakers
(H) Hosts

==== Matches ====
30 July 2024	Bodoland	0–2	NorthEast United	Kokrajhar, Assam
15:00 IST		Report	Jithin 49'; Ankith P. 90+2'	Stadium: SAI Stadium; Attendance: 12,210; Referee: I Jamal Mohamed; Man of the Match: Jithin Madathil Subran (NorthEast United)

3 August 2024	Odisha	5–0	BSF	Kokrajhar, Assam
16:00 IST	Rahul 50'; Ashangbam 56'; Givson 58', 79'; Roshan 78'	Report		Stadium: SAI Stadium; Attendance: 1,400; Referee: Surojit Das; Man of the Match: Givson Singh (Odisha FC)

6 August 2024	Bodoland	2–0	Odisha	Kokrajhar, Assam
16:00 IST	Sanyasi 42'; Arjun 88'	Report		Stadium: SAI Stadium; Attendance: 7,338; Referee: Lalit Singh Rawat; Man of the Match: Wanboklang Lyngkhoi (Bodoland FC)

9 August 2024	NorthEast United	4–0	BSF	Kokrajhar, Assam
19:00 IST	Guillermo 8', 48'; Jithin 20'; Alaeddine 90+7'	Report		Stadium: SAI Stadium; Attendance: 1,635; Referee: Surojit Das; Man of the Match: Guillermo Fernández (NorthEast United FC)

12 August 2024	Bodoland	4–3	BSF	Kokrajhar, Assam
19:00 IST	Mitinga 2'; Jwngbla 54' (pen.), 79'; Sibra 62'	Report	Kishori 50', 69'; Asif 89'	Stadium: SAI Stadium; Attendance: 10,963; Referee: Lalit Singh Rawat; Man of the Match: Jwngbla Brahma (Bodoland FC)

16 August 2024	NorthEast United	5–1	Odisha	Kokrajhar, Assam
19:00 IST	Jithin M. S. 17', 20'; Tankadhar (o.g.) 56'; Guillermo 76'; Thoi 85'	Report	Singson 64'	Stadium: SAI Stadium; Attendance: 3,240; Referee: I Jamal Mohamed; Man of the Match: Jithin M. S. (NorthEast United FC)

=== Group F ===
Pos	Team	Pld	W	D	L	GF	GA	GD	Pts	Qualification	SHI	GOA	(Nepal) TRI	RDU
1	Shillong Lajong (H)	3	2	1	0	4	1	+3	7	Advanced to knockout stage			1–0	2–0
2	Goa	3	2	1	0	7	5	+2	7		1–1		2–1	4–3
3	(Nepal) Tribhuvan Army	3	1	0	2	5	3	+2	3					
4	Rangdajied United (H)	3	0	0	3	3	10	−7	0				0–2	

Source: Twitter
Rules for classification: Group stage tiebreakers
(H) Hosts

==== Matches ====
2 August 2024	Shillong Lajong	1–0	(Nepal) Tribhuvan Army	Shillong, Meghalaya
16:00 IST	Wadajied 7'	Report		Stadium: Jawaharlal Nehru Stadium; Attendance: 9,000; Referee: Jehrul Islam; Man of the Match: Wadajied Ryngkhlem (Shillong Lajong)

5 August 2024	Goa	4–3	Rangdajied United	Shillong, Meghalaya
19:00 IST	D'Cunha 48'; Murgaonkar 58'; Lalthangliana 79'; Fernandes 90+6'	Report	Owanijuh Pajuh 19'; Pynbhalang Suting 61'; Apborlang Kurbah 85'	Stadium: Jawaharlal Nehru Stadium; Attendance: 4,125; Referee: Ashwin; Man of the Match: Vellington Fernandes (FC Goa)

8 August 2024	Goa	2–1	(Nepal) Tribhuvan Army	Shillong, Meghalaya
19:00 IST	Lalthangliana 1'; Carvalho 50'		Basant 66'	Stadium: Jawaharlal Nehru Stadium; Attendance: 2,134; Referee: K Ramdasan; Man of the Match: Leander D'Cunha (FC Goa)

10 August 2024	Shillong Lajong	2–0	Rangdajied United	Shillong, Meghalaya
16:00 IST	Kharbudon 22'; Kharshong 48'	Report		Stadium: Jawaharlal Nehru Stadium; Attendance: 13,661; Referee: Ashwin; Man of the Match: Ronney Willson Kharbudon (Shillong Lajong)

13 August 2024	Rangdajied United	0–2	(Nepal) Tribhuvan Army	Shillong, Meghalaya
19:00 IST		Report	Gillespye 21', 66' (pen.)	Stadium: Jawaharlal Nehru Stadium; Attendance: 1,000; Referee: K Ramdasan; Man of the Match: Gillespye Jung Karki (Tribhuvan Army)

17 August 2024	Shillong Lajong	1–1	Goa	Shillong, Meghalaya
19:00 IST	Rudwere 30'	Report	Murgaonkar 33'	Stadium: Jawaharlal Nehru Stadium; Attendance: 14,248; Referee: Jehrul Islam; Man of the Match: Balkaran Singh (FC Goa)

== Ranking of 2nd placed teams ==
Pos	Grp	Team	Pld	W	D	L	GF	GA	GD	Pts	Qualification
1	C	Punjab	3	2	1	0	7	1	+6	7	Advanced to knockout stage
2	A	East Bengal	3	2	1	0	6	2	+4	7	Advanced to knockout stage
3	F	Goa	3	2	1	0	7	5	+2	7	
4	D	Jamshedpur	3	2	0	1	7	4	+3	6	
5	E	Bodoland	3	2	0	1	6	5	+1	6	
6	B	Mohammedan	3	1	1	1	4	4	0	4	

Source: Twitter
