= Rédah Atassi =

Moroccan footballer (born 1991)

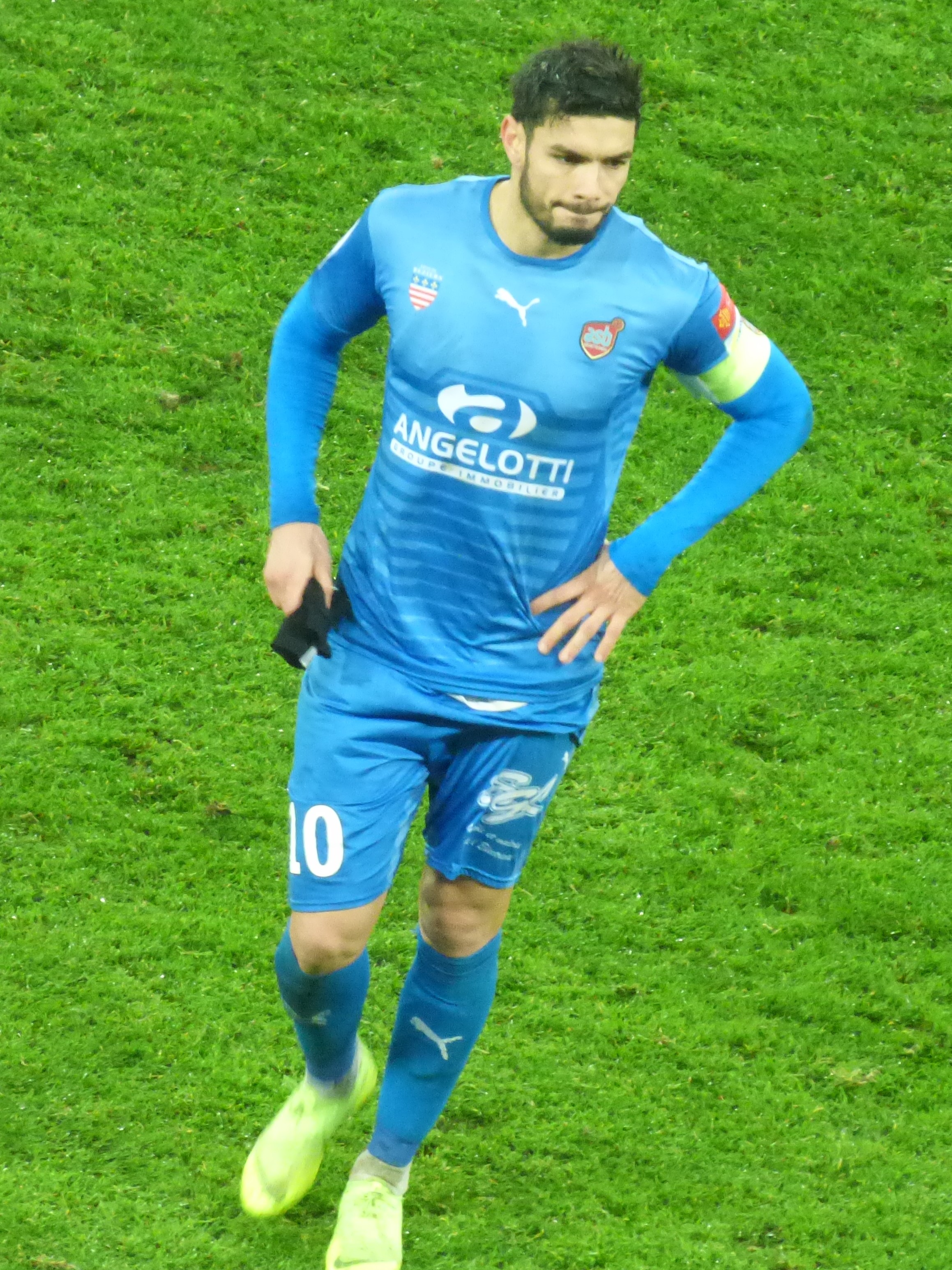
- Atassi in 2019

Personal information
- Full name: Rédah Atassi
- Date of birth: 16 March 1991 (age 35)
- Place of birth: Agen, France
- Height: 1.87 m (6 ft 2 in)
- Position: Centre-back

Team information
- Current team: TFC

Youth career
- 1998–2011: Toulouse

Senior career*
Years	Team	Apps	(Gls)
2011–2012	Getafe B	12	(0)
2012–2013	FUS	0	(0)
2013–2020	Béziers	141	(4)
2020	Hassania Agadir	14	(3)
2020–2021	Al-Adalah	33	(2)
2021–2023	Al Urooba	25	(1)
2024–2025	Downtown Heroes		
2025	Colomiers	2	(0)
2025–	TFC	25	(1)

International career
2010–2012	Morocco U20	8	(0)
- * Club domestic league appearances and goals as of 19:50, 2 August 2020 (UTC)

Rédah Atassi (born 16 March 1991) is a Moroccan professional footballer who plays UAE Third Division League club TFC a centre-back.

== Professional career ==
A youth product of Toulouse FC since the age of 8, Atassi was captain of their reserve side in 2011. He began his career with brief spells with Getafe CF B and Fath Union Sport from 2011 to 2013.

Atassi joined AS Béziers when they were in the Championnat de France amateur, and helped them with successive promotions to the professional Ligue 2 in 2018. He made his professional debut with Béziers in a 2–0 Ligue 2 win over AS Nancy on 27 July 2018.

== International career ==
Atassi was born in France, and is of Moroccan descent. He represented the Morocco U20s in various friendlies in 2011 and the 2012 Toulon Tournament.
