= Nadiya Nighat =

Indian football manager

Personal information
- Full name: Nadiya Nighat
- Place of birth: Jammu and Kashmir, India

Team information
- Current team: Downtown Heroes FC

Managerial career
- Years: Team
- Downtown Heroes FC
- Real Kashmir FC

Nadiya Nighat is an Indian professional football manager and former footballer from Jammu and Kashmir. She is currently the head coach of Downtown Heroes FC's women's team.

== Career ==
Nadiya began playing football in 2007 after joining training sessions at the Amar Singh College ground in Srinagar. She initially trained alongside boys under coach Mohammad Abdullah and later represented Jammu and Kashmir in youth and national-level competitions. In 2010, she made her first national-level appearance through Ministry of Youth Affairs and Sports.

Nadiya subsequently became involved in coaching and she obtained an AIFF D Licence in 2015 and completed a football coaching course at the National Institute of Sports patiala. She later obtained an Asian Football Confederation "C" Licence and completed a Level 1 scouting course through IPSO.
