= Gillespye Jung Karki =

Nepali footballer (born 1998)

Personal information
- Full name: Gillespye Jung Karki
- Date of birth: 19 November 1998 (age 27)
- Place of birth: Dhulikhel, Nepal
- Height: 1.85 m (6 ft 1 in)
- Position: Striker

Team information
- Current team: Kathmandu Rayzrs
- Number: 7

Youth career
- 2021–2022: Tribhuwan Army

Senior career*
Years	Team	Apps	(Gls)
2022–2023	Tushal Youth Club	11	(4)
2023–	Tribhuwan Army	22	(6)
2023	→ Butwal Lumbini (loan)	8	(0)
2025–	Kathmandu Rayzrs		

International career^{‡}
2023–	Nepal	18	(3)
- * Club domestic league appearances and goals ‡ National team caps and goals as of 14 October 2025

Gillespye Jung Karki (Nepali: जिलेस्पी जंग कार्की; born 19 November 1998) is a Nepalese professional footballer who plays as a striker for Nepal Super League club Kathmandu Rayzrs and the Nepal national team.

== Personal life ==
Karki is the younger brother of Nepal national team striker George Prince Karki.

== Club career ==
Karki began his career with the reserves team of Tribhuwan Army, before joining Tushal Youth Club in the B-Division League for the 2022 season. He scored 4 goals in 11 games in his first season at the club.

In 2023, he rejoined Tribhuwan Army and was made the club captain. He scored 6 goals in 22 games in his debut season in the top-flight. On May 10, 2023, he scored the only goal as the Army secured a victory against title contenders, Church Boys United.

== International career ==
On 8 September 2023, Karki made his international debut for Nepal during a goalless draw with Myanmar.

On 11 June 2024, Karki scored his maiden goal against Yemen during a 2–2 draw in the 2026 FIFA World Cup qualification – AFC second round.

== Career statistics ==
=== Club ===
As of 9 June 2023.

Club	Season	Division	League		Other		Total	
Club	Season	Division	Apps	Goals	Apps	Goals	Apps	Goals
Tushal Youth Club	2022	Martyr's Memorial B-Division League	11	4	0	0	11	4
Tribhuwan Army	2023	Martyr's Memorial A-Division League	22	6	0	0	22	6
Career total			33	10	0	0	33	10

=== International ===
As of 14 October 2025.

Nepal national team
Year	Apps	Goals
2023	6	0
2024	5	2
2025	7	1
Total	18	3

=== International goals ===
Scores and results list Nepal's goal tally first.

No.	Date	Venue	Opponent	Score	Result	Competition
1.	11 June 2024	Prince Mohamed bin Fahd Stadium, Dammam, Saudi Arabia	Yemen	2–1	2–2	2026 FIFA World Cup qualification
2.	16 November 2024	Central Republican Stadium, Dushanbe, Tajikistan	Afghanistan	1–0	2–0	Friendly
3.	21 March 2025	National Stadium, Kallang, Singapore	Singapore	1–0	1–0	Friendly
