= Vellington Fernandes =

Indian footballer (born 2003)

Personal information
- Full name: Vellington Marcos Fernandes
- Date of birth: 2 March 2003 (age 23)
- Place of birth: Goa, India
- Position: Midfielder

Team information
- Current team: FC Goa
- Number: 46

Youth career
- Churchill Brothers
- 2019–2020: Indian Arrows

Senior career*
Years	Team	Apps	(Gls)
2020–2022	Indian Arrows	13	(0)
2022–2025	FC Goa B	0	(0)
2024–	FC Goa	0	(0)
- * Club domestic league appearances and goals as of 09:32, 12 February 2026 (UTC)

Vellington Marcos Fernandes (born 2 March 2003) is an Indian professional footballer who plays as a midfielder for Indian Super League club FC Goa.

== Career ==
Vellington Fernandes made his first professional appearance for Indian Arrows on 10 January 2021 against Churchill Brothers as substitute on 55th minute.

== Career statistics ==
As of 10 January 2021

Club	Season	League			Federation Cup		Durand Cup		AFC		Total	
Club	Season	Division	Apps	Goals	Apps	Goals	Apps	Goals	Apps	Goals	Apps	Goals
Indian Arrows	2020–21	I-League	1	0	0	0	0	0	—	—	1	0
Career total			1	0	0	0	0	0	0	0	1	0
