= Downtown Heroes FC =

Indian association football club

Downtown Heroes
- Full name: Downtown Heroes Football Club
- Nickname: The Heroes
- Short name: DHFC
- Founded: 2020; 6 years ago
- Ground: TRC Turf Ground
- Capacity: 11,000
- Chairman: Mushtaq Bashir
- Head coach: Hilal Rasool Parray
- League: JKFA Professional League
Home colours	Away colours	Third colours

Downtown Heroes Football Club is an Indian professional football club based in Srinagar, Jammu and Kashmir. It currently competes in the JKFA Professional League. It has also competed in the I-League 2, the I-League 3 and the Durand Cup.

== History ==
The club was founded in 2020 by a group of young professionals with the aim of promoting sports culture and steering the youth away from drug addiction. The club's philosophy is to nurture football talent at the grassroots level, provide high quality training facilities and coaching. Their motto is "Players are bred, not born". The club is named after the downtown area of Srinagar, where the founders started holding practices and scouting. The club participated in the 2023 and 2024 editions of the Durand Cup, where they finished at the group stage.

== Current technical staff ==
Position	Name
Head coach	(India) Hilal Rasool Parray
Head coach (Women's team)	(India) Nadiya Nighat
Goalkeeping coach	(India)
Team manager	(India) Nadeem Ul Islam
Physio	(India)
