= 2019–20 BDFA Super Division =

BDFA Super Division
- Season: 2019–20
- Dates: 2 November 2019 – 4 January 2020
- Champions: Bengaluru FC 'B' (2nd title)
- Relegated: AGORC; Students Union
- Matches: 91
- Highest scoring: AGORC 0–7 Bengaluru FC 'B' (27 December 2019)
- Longest winning run: Bengaluru FC 'B' (9 games)
- Longest unbeaten run: Kickstart FC (13 games)
- All statistics correct as of 4 January 2020.

The 2019–20 BDFA Super Division was the seventeenth season of the BDFA Super Division which is the third tier of the Indian association football system and the top tier of the Karnataka football system. The season started on 2 November 2019. Bengaluru FC 'B' were the defending champions. All games were played at Bangalore Football Stadium. The league was contested by top 12 teams from 2018 to 2019 season as well as Income Tax and AGORC who were promoted from 2018 to 2019 BDFA 'A' division. They replaced Jawahar Union and CIL who were relegated to 2019–20 BDFA 'A' Division.

Bengaluru FC 'B' defended the title won in 2018–19 season. At the end of the season, Students Union and AGORC were relegated to 'A' Division.

== Teams ==
Fourteen teams complete in the league.

Club
Army Service Corps (ASC)
ADE
Accountants General's Office Recreation Club (AGORC)
Bangalore Dream United
Bangalore Eagles
Bangalore Independents
Bengaluru FC 'B'
Bengaluru United
Income Tax
Kickstart
Madras Engineer Group (MEG)
Ozone FC
South United
Students Union

=== Personnel and kits ===
Team	Manager	Captain	Kit manufacturer
ASC		(India) Jotin Singh	
Bengaluru FC 'B'	(India) Naushad Moosa	(India) Roshan Singh	
Bengaluru United	(India) Gouramangi Singh	(India) Mohammad Asrar Rehbar	
Income Tax		(India) A. D. Kumar	
Kickstart FC	(Denmark) Lars Sørensen	(India) Vignesh G.	
Ozone	(India) Noel Wilson	(India) Gunashekar Vignesh	
South United	(India) Alfred Fernandes	(India) Magesh Selva	Vector X

== Table ==
Pos	Team	Pld	W	D	L	GF	GA	GD	Pts	Qualification or relegation
1	Bengaluru FC 'B' (C)	13	11	1	1	40	6	+34	34	Champions
2	Kickstart FC	13	10	3	0	45	8	+37	33	
3	Bengaluru United	13	7	5	1	23	7	+16	26	
4	Army Service Corps	13	7	4	2	32	17	+15	25	
5	South United	13	7	2	4	23	17	+6	23	
6	Ozone	13	6	3	4	16	11	+5	21	
7	MEG	13	5	5	3	18	20	−2	20	
8	Bangalore Independents	13	5	0	8	17	27	−10	15	
9	Bangalore Dream United	13	4	2	7	12	36	−24	14	
10	Bangalore Eagles	13	2	7	4	13	15	−2	13	
11	ADE	13	2	5	6	12	26	−14	11	
12	Income Tax	13	1	4	8	7	19	−12	7	
13	Students Union (R)	13	1	2	10	8	22	−14	5	Relegation to BDFA A Division
14	AGORC (R)	13	0	3	10	4	39	−35	3	Relegation to BDFA A Division

Source: Garden City Soccer
Rules for classification: 1) points; 2) goal difference; 3) number of goals scored
(C) Champions; (R) Relegated

== Results ==
Home \ Away	ASC	ADE	AGORC	DU	BE	BI	BFC	BU	IT	KFC	MEG	OFC	SUFC	SU
ASC	—	1–1	0–5	8–1	2–1	3–0	3–2	1–4	4–2	0–2	1–1	2–2	1–1	1–0
ADE	—	—	0–0	3–2	0–0	5–4	0–1	0–2	2–2	0–4	0–3	0–2	0–4	1–1
AGORC	—	—	—	0–1	2–2	0–2	0–7	0–4	0–0	0–6	0–3	0–2	0–4	2–3
Bangalore Dream United	—	—	—	—	0–0	2–1	0–8	0–2	0–1	0–5	2–2	1–2	1–5	1–0
Bangalore Eagles	—	—	—	—	—	1–3	0–1	0–0	0–0	2–2	2–2	1–0	1–2	3–1
Bangalore Independents	—	—	—	—	—	—	0–1	0–4	3–0	0–6	1–2	0–2	2–1	1–0
Bengaluru FC 'B'	—	—	—	—	—	—	—	2–1	3–0	1–1	6–1	3–0	4–0	1–0
Bengaluru United	—	—	—	—	—	—	—	—	1–0	2–2	0–0	1–0	1–1	1–1
Income Tax	—	—	—	—	—	—	—	—	—	1–2	1–2	0–0	0–1	1–0
Kickstart FC	—	—	—	—	—	—	—	—	—	—	4–0	2–1	4–0	5–1
MEG	—	—	—	—	—	—	—	—	—	—	—	1–1	0–2	1–0
Ozone	—	—	—	—	—	—	—	—	—	—	—	—	2–0	2–0
South United	—	—	—	—	—	—	—	—	—	—	—	—	—	2–1
Students Union	—	—	—	—	—	—	—	—	—	—	—	—	—	—

Source: Garden City Soccer
Legend: Blue = home team win; Yellow = draw; Red = away team win.

== Matches ==
2 November 2019	Bengaluru United	4–1	Army Service Corps	Bangalore
13:30 IST	Rehbar 29', 34'; Bhatkal 36'; Bhatt 81'		J. Singh 13'	Stadium: Bangalore Football Stadium

2 November 2019	South United	2–1	Students Union	Bangalore
15:30 IST	Muinao 45'; Vaz 60'		Lokur 78'	Stadium: Bangalore Football Stadium

3 November 2019	Bangalore Independents	3–1	Bangalore Eagles	Bangalore
13:30 IST	Gopi 9', 46'; Subhash 45+1'	Report	Vishnu 81'	Stadium: Bangalore Football Stadium

3 November 2019	ADE	3–2	Bangalore Dream United	Bangalore
15:30 IST	Anoop C. 25'; Stephen Rajkiran L. 72'; Bibin Babu 78'	Report	Rahul Acharya 32'; Udith Rajashekar 71'	Stadium: Bangalore Football Stadium

4 November 2019	AGORC	0–0	Income Tax	Bangalore
15:30 IST				Stadium: Bangalore Football Stadium

5 November 2019	South United	0–2	Ozone	Bangalore
15:30 IST		Report	G. Singh 59'; Bhat 80'	Stadium: Bangalore Football Stadium

6 November 2019	ADE	1–1	Students Union	Bangalore
15:30 IST	Babu 83'	Report	Das 55'	Stadium: Bangalore Football Stadium

7 November 2019	AGORC	2–2	Bangalore Eagles	Bangalore
13:30 IST	Aayush David Koshy 81'; Jaikumar V. 87'	Report	Appu 37'; Vignesh S. 39'	Stadium: Bangalore Football Stadium

7 November 2019	MEG	2–1	Income Tax	Bangalore
15:30 IST	Shubam Rana 81'; Parthiban K. 90'	Report	AD Kumar 45+1'	Stadium: Bangalore Football Stadium

8 November 2019	Ozone	0–1	Bengaluru United	Bangalore
15:30 IST			Rehber 45+1'	Stadium: Bangalore Football Stadium

9 November 2019	ASC	3–0	Bangalore Independents	Bangalore
15:30 IST	Thiyagarajan 25'; Anthony Jay Praksham 34' (o.g.); J. Singh 66'			Stadium: Bangalore Football Stadium

11 November 2019	Bangalore Eagles	0–0	Bengaluru United	Bangalore
13:30 IST		Report		Stadium: Bangalore Football Stadium

11 November 2019	Bangalore Dream United	1–5	South United	Bangalore
15:30 IST	Rautela 15'	Report	Harijan 23', 88'; Muinao 36' (pen.); Vaz 67'; Venkatachalam 90'	Stadium: Bangalore Football Stadium

12 November 2019	Bangalore Independents	3–0	Income Tax	Bangalore
13:30 IST	Abdul 40'; Satish Kumar Jr 45+2'; Gopi 90+4'	Report		Stadium: Bangalore Football Stadium

12 November 2019	Ozone	2–0	ADE	Bangalore
15:30 IST	Mattummal 65'; Bhatt 75'	Report		Stadium: Bangalore Football Stadium

13 November 2019	Kickstart FC	6–0	AGORC	Bangalore
13:30 IST	Rossario 24'; Shelton Paul 37'; Echebiri 40'; Nikhil Raj 43'; Sudheer Kotikela 79'; Pradeep R. 81'	Report		Stadium: Bangalore Football Stadium

13 November 2019	ASC	3–2	Bengaluru FC 'B'	Bangalore
15:30 IST	Thiyagarajan 16'; J. Singh 85'; Niraj Singh 90+3' (pen.)	Report	Lalrindika 52'; Augustine 74' (pen.)	Stadium: Bangalore Football Stadium

14 November 2019	Students Union	0–1	MEG	Bangalore
15:30 IST		Report	Khongsai 28'	Stadium: Bangalore Football Stadium

16 November 2019	Bangalore Independents	0–6	Kickstart FC	Bangalore
13:30 IST			Echebiri 17', 62'; Sudheer 34'; Nikhil Raj 43', 53', 73'	Stadium: Bangalore Football Stadium

16 November 2019	ADE	1–1	ASC	Bangalore
15:30 IST	Saleem 64'		Arunjith Meitei 22'	Stadium: Bangalore Football Stadium

17 November 2019	Students Union	3–2	AGORC	Bangalore
13:30 IST	Das 5'; Obem Sunday Junior 33'; Tamba Ibrahim Idi 84'	Report	Pradeep 44'; Manju 58'	Stadium: Bangalore Football Stadium

17 November 2019	MEG	2–2	Bangalore Dream United	Bangalore
15:30 IST	Shaikh Muzeeb 60'; Lethaolen Khongsai 88'	Report	Aditya Rauela 8'; Mohammed Niyas 78'	Stadium: Bangalore Football Stadium

18 November 2019	Bengaluru United	1–0	Income Tax	Bangalore
13:30 IST	Rehbar 36'	Report		Stadium: Bangalore Football Stadium

20 November 2019	Bangalore Eagles	0–1	Bengaluru FC 'B'	Bangalore
13:30 IST		Report	Lalrindika 49'	Stadium: Bangalore Football Stadium

21 November 2019	Income Tax	0–1	South United	Bangalore
13:30 IST		Report	Muinao 89'	Stadium: Bangalore Football Stadium

21 November 2019	Ozone	2–0	Bangalore Independents	Bangalore
15:30 IST	Aloysious M. 45+2'; Gagandeep Singh 76'			Stadium: Bangalore Football Stadium; Referee: Chinnappan Leo

22 November 2019	Kickstart FC	4–0	ADE	Bangalore
13:30 IST	Solaimalai 15'; Abilash 26'; Vzoch Emmanuel 51'; Sudheer Kotikela 55'	Report		Stadium: Bangalore Football Stadium

22 November 2019	ASC	5–0	AGORC	Bangalore
15:30 IST	J. Singh 20' (pen.), 47'; Thiyagarajan 24'; Sharath Kumar 81'; Deepak Singh 88'	Report		Stadium: Bangalore Football Stadium

23 November 2019	Bengaluru FC 'B'	1–0	Students Union	Bangalore
13:30 IST	Suresh 90+4'			Stadium: Bangalore Football Stadium

23 November 2019	Bangalore Eagles	2–2	MEG	Bangalore
15:30 IST	Vignesh Srinivas 45+2'; Sunil Christopher 63'		Ahmed Asurul Huq 1'; Prabin Tigga 4' (o.g.)	Stadium: Bangalore Football Stadium

24 November 2019	Bangalore Dream United	0–2	Bengaluru United	Bangalore
15:30 IST			Thomya L. Shimray 17'; Kiran Saravana 90+1' (pen.)	Stadium: Bangalore Football Stadium

25 November 2019	Kickstart FC	4–0	South United	Bangalore
15:30 IST	Sudheer Kotikela 17', 22', 49'; Uzochi Emmanuel Echebiri 47'			Stadium: Bangalore Football Stadium

26 November 2019	ASC	1–1	MEG	Bangalore
15:30 IST	Jotin Singh 29'		Lalthaolen Khongsai 90+4' (pen.)	Stadium: Bangalore Football Stadium

27 November 2019	Bangalore Independents	1–2	Bangalore Dream United	Bangalore
13:30 IST	Narendra 90+1' (pen.)		Shafeeq Thekkumpat 46'; Vishnu 61'	Stadium: Bangalore Football Stadium

27 November 2019	ADE	2–2	Income Tax	Bangalore
15:30 IST	Bibin Babu 28', 77'		Austin 24'; Amal Dhungat 56'	Stadium: Bangalore Football Stadium

28 November 2019	Bangalore Eagles	1–2	South United	Bangalore
13:30 IST	Cletus Paul 30'		Rungsing Muinao 13'; Abhilash Mundanmaril Krishnan 85'	Stadium: Bangalore Football Stadium

28 November 2019	AGORC	0–2	Ozone FC	Bangalore
15:30 IST			Manju 4' (o.g.); Allocious 22'	Stadium: Bangalore Football Stadium

30 November 2019	Bengaluru FC 'B'	1–1	Kickstart FC	Bangalore
13:30 IST	Biswa Dorjee 83'		Sairuat Kima 12' (o.g.)	Stadium: Bangalore Football Stadium

30 November 2019	Bengaluru United	1–1	Students Union	Bangalore
15:30 IST	Hardik Bhat 16'		Pravruth 29'	Stadium: Bangalore Football Stadium

1 December 2019	Ozone FC	2–1	Bangalore Dream United	Bangalore
13:30 IST	Allocious 1'; Harpreet Rulbir 90+4'		Avhishek Singh 30'	Stadium: Bangalore Football Stadium

1 December 2019	ASC	4–2	Income Tax	Bangalore
15:30 IST	Jerin Francies K 33'; Jotin Singh 57'; Singnam Arunjit Mettei 78' (pen.); Oinam Gautham Singh 90+1'		J Prasad 9'; D Ahamed 84'	Stadium: Bangalore Football Stadium

2 December 2019	ADE	0–3	MEG	Bangalore
13:30 IST			Pawan Kumar 37' (o.g.); Saikh Mujeeb 50'; Subham Rana 79'	Stadium: Bangalore Football Stadium

2 December 2019	Bengaluru FC 'B'	4–0	South United	Bangalore
15:30 IST	Ajay Chhetri 22'; Biswa Dorjee 45', 84'; Lalnunsiama 70' (o.g.)			Stadium: Bangalore Football Stadium

3 December 2019	Bangalore Eagles	2–2	Kickstart FC	Bangalore
13:30 IST	Prabin Tigga 35'; Vingnesh Srinivas 51'		K Raymond Stephen 7'; Sudheer Kotikela 80'	Stadium: Bangalore Football Stadium

3 December 2019	Students Union	0–1	Bangalore Independents	Bangalore
15:30 IST			Anthony Xavier 3'	Stadium: Bangalore Football Stadium

5 December 2019	Income Tax	0–1	Bangalore Dream United	Bangalore
15:30 IST			Ajmal Riyaz Puthusseri 8'	Stadium: Bangalore Football Stadium

6 December 2019	Students Union	1–3	Bangalore Eagles	Bangalore
13:30 IST	Sujikumar M 10'		Shivakumar 25'; Sarath 55'; Cletus Paul 60'	Stadium: Bangalore Football Stadium

6 December 2019	Bengaluru FC 'B'	6–1	MEG	Bangalore
15:30 IST	Augustine 35', 41', 67'; Ajay Chhetri 45+1'; Suresh 83'; Lalrindika 89'		Shaik Muzeeb 50'	Stadium: Bangalore Football Stadium

7 December 2019	South United	1–2	Bangalore Independents	Bangalore
13:30 IST	Rungsing Muinao 42' (pen.)		Subhash R 57'; Maria Nelson R 90+2'	Stadium: Bangalore Football Stadium

7 December 2019	Bengaluru United	2–2	Kickstart FC	Bangalore
15:30 IST	Mohammed Asrar 55'; Amey Bhatkal 58'		Emmanuel Echebiri 64'; Edwin Rossario 90+6'	Stadium: Bangalore Football Stadium

8 December 2019	Ozone FC	2–2	ASC	Bangalore
15:30 IST	Kapil Bhat 38'; Harpreet Rubair 90+4'		Jerin Francis 41'; Deepak Singh 79'	Stadium: Bangalore Football Stadium

9 December 2019	Bengaluru FC 'B'	8–0	Bangalore Dream United	Bangalore
15:30 IST	Advait Shinde 30', 39', 90'; Biswa Darjee 55'; Augustine 62'; Mohammed Rafi 64'; Fredy Chawngthangsanga 77'; Namgyal Bhutia 90+2'			Stadium: Bangalore Football Stadium

11 December 2019	Kickstart FC	2–1	Income Tax	Bangalore
13:30 IST	Emmanuel 22'; Surya 26'	Report	Syed Ahmed 21'	Stadium: Bangalore Football Stadium

11 December 2019	Bangalore Eagles	1–0	Ozone	Bangalore
15:30 IST	Sarath Mohan 89'	Report		Stadium: Bangalore Football Stadium

12 December 2019	ADE	0–2	Bengaluru United	Bangalore
13:30 IST		Report	Bhatkal 10'; Dosapati 12'	Stadium: Bangalore Football Stadium

12 December 2019	AGORC	0–3	MEG	Bangalore
15:30 IST		Report	Nitin 1', 22'; Lethaolen Khongsai 90+2'	Stadium: Bangalore Football Stadium

13 December 2019	Army Service Corps	1–1	South United	Bangalore
13:30 IST	J. Singh 13'	Report	Lalnunsiama 41'	Stadium: Bangalore Football Stadium

13 December 2019	Dream United	1–0	Students Union	Bangalore
15:30 IST	Murshid KP 84'	Report		Stadium: Bangalore Football Stadium

14 December 2019	Bangalore Independents	0–1	Bengaluru FC 'B'	Bangalore
15:30 IST		Report	Mohammed Rafi 62'	Stadium: Bangalore Football Stadium

16 December 2019	South United	4–0	ADE	Bangalore
13:30 IST	Harijan 33'; Vikram 34', 60'; Vaz 90+1'	Report		Stadium: Bangalore Football Stadium

16 December 2019	ASC	0–2	Kickstart FC	Bangalore
15:30 IST		Report	Rossario 32'; Johnson A. 62'	Stadium: Bangalore Football Stadium

17 December 2019	Income Tax	0–3	Bengaluru FC 'B'	Bangalore
13:30 IST		Report	Lalthangliana 8'; Shinde 69'; Lalrindika 71' (pen.)	Stadium: Bangalore Football Stadium

17 December 2019	Dream United	0–0	Bangalore Eagles	Bangalore
15:30 IST		Report		Stadium: Bangalore Football Stadium

18 December 2019	Bengaluru United	0–0	MEG	Bangalore
13:30 IST		Report		Stadium: Bangalore Football Stadium

18 December 2019	Bangalore Independents	2–0	AGORC	Bangalore
15:30 IST	Satish Kumar Jr 31'; V. Surendra Prasad 60'	Report		Stadium: Bangalore Football Stadium

19 December 2019	Ozone	2–0	Students Union	Bangalore
15:30 IST	Alocious M. 17'; Shahajas T. 80'	Report		Stadium: Bangalore Football Stadium

21 December 2019	Bangalore Dream United	0–1	AGORC	Bangalore
13:30 IST			Avishek 43'	Stadium: Bangalore Football Stadium

21 December 2019	Bangalore Independents	0–4	Bengaluru United	Bangalore
15:30 IST			Rehbar 23', 68', 71'; Brandon Pinto 43'	Stadium: Bangalore Football Stadium

22 December 2019	Income Tax	1–0	Students Union	Bangalore
13:30 IST	Austin Chukwuka Uluocha 55'	Report		Stadium: Bangalore Football Stadium

22 December 2019	Kickstart FC	2–1	Ozone	Bangalore
15:30 IST	Keith Raymond Stephen 52'; Sudheer Kotikela 75'	Report	Shahajas T. 50'	Stadium: Bangalore Football Stadium

23 December 2019	ASC	2–1	Bangalore Eagles	Bangalore
13:30 IST	J. Singh 52'; Niraj Singh 78'	Report	Celtus Dominic 55'	Stadium: Bangalore Football Stadium

23 December 2019	AGORC	0–0	ADE	Bangalore
15:30 IST		Report		Stadium: Bangalore Football Stadium

24 December 2019	MEG	0–2	South United	Bangalore
13:30 IST		Report	Abilash M. Krishna 37'; Mahesh 90+2'	Stadium: Bangalore Football Stadium

24 December 2019	Bengaluru United	1–2	Bengaluru FC 'B'	Bangalore
15:30 IST	Bhatkal 38'	Report	R. Singh 14'; Lalrindika 44'	Stadium: Bangalore Football Stadium

26 December 2019	Kickstart FC	5–0	Bangalore Dream United	Bangalore
15:30 IST	Nikhil Raj 15', 26'; Echebiri 16'; Sudheer Kotikela 35'; Rossario 60'	Report		Stadium: Bangalore Football Stadium

27 December 2019	AGORC	0–7	Bengaluru FC 'B'	Bangalore
13:30 IST		Report	Augustine 5'; Advait Shinde 25', 63'; Lalrindika 26', 31', 51'; Morajkar 69'	Stadium: Bangalore Football Stadium

27 December 2019	Students Union	0–1	ASC	Bangalore
15:30 IST		Report	Niraj Singh 58'	Stadium: Bangalore Football Stadium

28 December 2019	Income Tax	0–0	Ozone	Bangalore
13:30 IST		Report		Stadium: Bangalore Football Stadium

28 December 2019	MEG	2–1	Bangalore Independents	Bangalore
15:30 IST	Abdul Jiyad KA 27', 64'	Report	K. Gopi 11'	Stadium: Bangalore Football Stadium

29 December 2019	ADE	0–0	Bangalore Eagles	Bangalore
13:30 IST		Report		Stadium: Bangalore Football Stadium; Referee: Suresh Devaraj

29 December 2019	Bengaluru United	4–0	AGORC	Bangalore
15:30 IST	Thomya L. Shimray 3', 87'; Arun Kumar D. 20'; Amey Bhatkal 28'	Report		Stadium: Bangalore Football Stadium

30 December 2019	Bengaluru FC 'B'	1–0	ADE	Bangalore
15:30 IST	Biswa Kr. Darjee 27'	Report		Stadium: Bangalore Football Stadium

31 December 2019	South United	4–0	AGORC	Bangalore
13:30 IST	Vaz 4', 80'; Avinash 27' (o.g.); Sathish Kumar MR 90+1'	Report		Stadium: Bangalore Football Stadium; Referee: Vinod Dhanraj

31 December 2019	MEG	1–1	Ozone	Bangalore
15:30 IST	Shaik Muzeeb 83'	Report	Dangmei Gaipuilan 86' (pen.)	Stadium: Bangalore Football Stadium

1 January 2020	ADE	5–4	Bangalore Independents	Bangalore
13:30 IST	P Mani 17'; Saleem A 18', 74' (pen.); Muhammed Arfas 21'; Pavankumar 76'	Report	V Surendra Prasad 8'; Lijith S 45+4'; Murali 62'; Sathishkumar 69'	Stadium: Bangalore Football Stadium

1 January 2020	Kickstart FC	5–1	Students Union	Bangalore
15:30 IST	Solaimalai 2', 80'; Emmanuel Echebiri 7', 25'; Nikhil Raj 33'	Report	Sunday Junior Obem 55'	Stadium: Bangalore Football Stadium

2 January 2020	Bangalore Dream United	1–8	ASC	Bangalore
13:30 IST	Avhishek 69'	Report	Jotin Singh 22', 47', 51' (pen.), 59', 78', 90+1'; Ramachandran MG 45+1', 84'	Stadium: Bangalore Football Stadium

2 January 2020	Income Tax	0–0	Bangalore Eagles	Bangalore
15:30 IST		Report		Stadium: Bangalore Football Stadium

3 January 2020	South United	1–1	Bengaluru United	Bangalore
15:30 IST	Hardik Bhat 51' (o.g.)	Report	Amey Bhatkal 59'	Stadium: Bangalore Football Stadium

4 January 2020	Bengaluru FC 'B'	3–0	Ozone	Bangalore
13:30 IST	Suresh 31'; Lalrindika 39'; A. Chhetri 74'	Report		Stadium: Bangalore Football Stadium

4 January 2020	MEG	0–4	Kickstart FC	Bangalore
15:30 IST		Report	Nikhil Raj 30', 77'; Sudheer Kotikela 39', 45'	Stadium: Bangalore Football Stadium

== Statistics ==
=== Hat-tricks ===
Player	For	Against	Result	Date	Ref
Nikhil Raj	Kickstart FC	Bangalore Independents	6–0	16 November 2019	
Sudheer Kotikela	Kickstart FC	South United	4–0	25 November 2019	
Leon Augustine	Bengaluru FC 'B'	MEG	6–1	6 December 2019	
Advait Shinde	Bengaluru FC 'B'	Bangalore Dream United	8–0	9 December 2019	
Mohammad Asrar Rehbar	FC Bengaluru United	Bangalore Independents	4–0	21 December 2019	
Edmund Lalrindika	Bengaluru FC 'B'	AGORC	7–0	27 December 2019	
