= 2026–27 Karnataka Super Division =

Karnataka Super Division
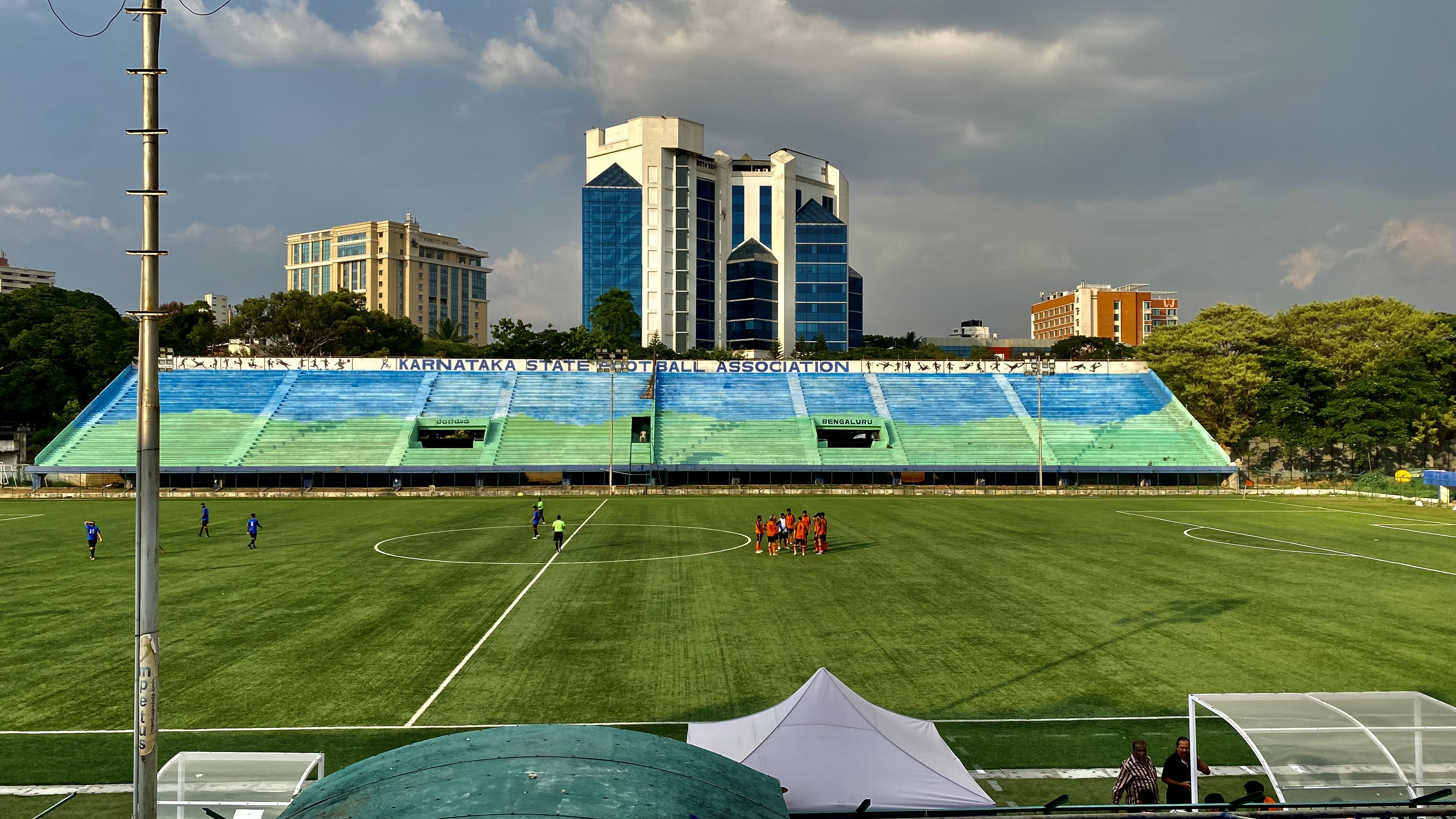
- Bengaluru Football Stadium on a matchday in May 2023.
- Season: 2025–26
- Dates: 10 September 2026 — 5 October 2026
- Champions: TBD
- Promoted: TBD
- Relegated: TBD
- Matches: 33
- Goals: 107 (3.24 per match)
- All statistics correct as of 28 September 2026.

The 2026–27 Karnataka Super Division formerly known as BDFA Super Division, is the 24th season of the Karnataka Super Division, the fifth-tier league in the Indian football system, and Karnataka's top-tier football league. Kickstart FC are the defending champions, having won the 2025-26 BDFA Super Division. Nineteen teams competed in the league in the 2026–27 season.

After being runners-up of 2020–21 and 2024–25 seasons, the previous season saw Kickstart FC clinching their first ever Super Division title.

== Changes from previous season ==
=== Relegated to A Division ===
- Students Union
- Bharat Bengaluru FC

=== Promoted from A Division ===
- Stride Sports FC
- Technico Football Foundation

== Teams ==
Host venue's location of the 2026–27 Karnataka Super Division.

Competing teams in the 2026–27 Karnataka Super Division League
Team	Location	Region	Stadium
ASC & C FC	Dommaluru	Central	Bangalore Football Stadium
Bangalore City FC	Kasturinagara	East	Bangalore Football Stadium
Bangalore Dream United FC	Unknown	—N/a	Bangalore Football Stadium
Bengaluru FC B	Halasuru	Central	Bangalore Football Stadium
FC Agniputhra	Basavanagara	East	Bangalore Football Stadium
FC Bengaluru United	Unknown	—N/a	Bangalore Football Stadium
FC Real Bengaluru	Yemaluru	East	Bangalore Football Stadium
HAL SC	Vibhutipura	East	Bangalore Football Stadium
Kickstart	Horamavu	East	Bangalore Football Stadium
Kodagu FC	Kushalanagar, Kodagu district	—N/a	Bangalore Football Stadium
MEG & C FC	Kasturinagara	Central	Bangalore Football Stadium
Parikrma FC	Byatarayanapura	North	Bangalore Football Stadium
Rebels FC	Mahalakshmi Layout	West	Bangalore Football Stadium
Roots FC	Dommaluru	Central	Bangalore Football Stadium
SC Bengaluru	VV puram	Central	Bangalore Football Stadium
South United	Halasuru	Central	Bangalore Football Stadium
Stride Sports FC	Unknown	—N/a	Bangalore Football Stadium
Technico Football Foundation	Cox Town	Central	Bangalore Football Stadium
United Stars FC	Malleshwaram	West	Bangalore Football Stadium

== Regular season ==
=== League table ===
Pos	Team	Pld	W	D	L	GF	GA	GD	Pts	Qualification or relegation
1	FC Bengaluru United^{IFL}	11	10	1	0	36	5	+31	31	Champions
2	South United	13	9	2	2	31	9	+22	29	Promotion to 2026–27 I-League 3
3	Kodagu FC	13	9	2	2	32	19	+13	29	
4	Bengaluru B^{ISL}	11	7	4	0	35	8	+27	25	
5	MEG & C FC	12	7	4	1	31	21	+10	25	
6	SC Bengaluru^{IL2}	13	5	4	4	22	13	+9	19	
7	Kickstart	11	5	4	2	15	12	+3	19	
8	Bangalore City	13	5	4	4	14	14	0	19	
9	FC Real Bengaluru	11	5	3	3	25	17	+8	18	
10	United Stars	12	5	2	5	17	26	−9	17	
11	Roots FC	14	4	2	8	15	21	−6	14	
12	FC Agniputhra^{IL3}	12	4	2	6	13	23	−10	14	
13	Stride Sports	11	3	3	5	13	18	−5	12	
14	Parikrma FC	10	3	3	4	11	16	−5	12	
15	Technico FF	13	3	0	10	13	49	−36	9	
16	Bangalore Dream United	12	2	2	8	8	26	−18	8	
17	Rebels FC	12	1	4	7	12	25	−13	7	
18	HAL SC	12	1	3	8	23	28	−5	6	Relegation to 2026–27 BDFA A Division
19	ASC & C FC	12	0	3	9	8	24	−16	3	Relegation to 2026–27 BDFA A Division

Source: The Away End
Rules for classification: 1) points; 2) goal difference; 3) number of goals scored

== See also ==
- Men
  - 2026–27 Indian Super League (Tier I)
  - 2026–27 Indian Football League (Tier II)
  - 2026–27 I-League 2 (Tier III)
  - 2026–27 I-League 3 (Tier IV)
  - 2026–27 Indian State Leagues (Tier V)
  - 2026-27 Super Cup
  - 2026 Durand Cup
- Women
  - 2026–27 Indian Women's League
  - 2026–27 Indian Women's League 2
