= 2016–17 BDFA Super Division =

BDFA Super Division
- Season: 2016–17
- Champions: Madras Engineer Group (2nd title)
- Relegated: AGORC; DYES
- Top goalscorer: Dada Nabeel (8 goals)

The 2016–17 BDFA Super Division was the fourteenth season of the BDFA Super Division which is the third tier of the Indian association football system and the top tier of the Karnataka football system. The season started on 23 January 2017 and ended on 19 March. Ozone FC were the defending champions. AGORC were promoted to Super Division after winning 'A' Division in 2015–16.

Madras Engineer Group (MEG) won the league securing 22 points in the league. MEG also won George Hoover cup defeating the runner-up Students Union 2–0. Dada Nabeel of Accountants General's Office Recreation Club, with eight goals, emerged as the top-scorer of the season. In the awards at the end of the season, Nardesh of Students Union was named the Best goalkeeper and MEG's Sukesh Leon, the Best playmaker. AGORC and DYES were relegated to A division for the next season.

== Teams ==
Club
Accountants General's Office Recreation Club (AGORC)
Army Service Corps (ASC)
Bengaluru FC
Controllerate of Inspection Electronics (CIL)
Department of Youth Empowerment and Sports (DYES)
Madras Engineer Group (MEG)
Ozone FC
Railway Wheel Factory (RWF)
South United
Students Union

== Table ==
Pos	Team	Pld	W	D	L	GF	GA	GD	Pts	Qualification or relegation
1	MEG (C)	9	7	1	1	19	14	+5	22	Champions
2	Students Union	9	6	2	1	22	16	+6	20	
3	Ozone FC	9	5	2	2	20	8	+12	17	
4	ASC	9	5	2	2	17	14	+3	17	
5	Bengaluru FC	9	4	3	2	16	13	+3	15	
6	South United	9	3	3	3	24	15	+9	12	
7	CIL	9	2	4	3	15	12	+3	10	
8	RWF	9	1	3	5	13	23	−10	6	
9	AGORC (R)	9	1	1	7	9	21	−12	4	Relegated to A Division
10	DYES (R)	9	0	1	8	42	26	+16	1	Relegated to A Division

Updated to match(es) played on unknown. Source: GCS Stars
Rules for classification: 1) points; 2) goal difference; 3) number of goals scored.
(C) Champions; (R) Relegated

== Results ==
=== Fixtures ===
23 January
IST

Students Union	2–0	DYES
Emmanuel 43'; Praveen 45+2'	Report

Bangalore Football Stadium, Bangalore
24 January
IST

CIL	3–0	AGORC
Edjique Landry 1', 45+2', 77'	Report

Bangalore Football Stadium, Bangalore
25 January
IST

South United	2–2	RWF
Magesh 14'; Subhash 51'	Report	Nandakumar 34', 81'

Bangalore Football Stadium, Bangalore
28 January
IST

AGORC	2–2	DYES
Nabeel 13'; Abhishek 59'	Report Archived 2024-12-27 at the Wayback Machine(subscription required)	Gangadhar 71'; Vikas 88'

Bangalore Football Stadium, Bangalore
29 January
IST

Bengaluru FC	1–3	ASC
Vignesh 80'	Report	Jotin Singh 11', 54', 71'

Bangalore Football Stadium, Bangalore
30 January
IST

South United	1–2	MEG
Subhash 70'	Report	Mutath 13'; Surai Singh 89'

Bangalore Football Stadium, Bangalore
31 January
IST

Ozone FC	2–3	Students Union
Akshay 70', 89'	Report	Sudhir 50'; Emmanuel 61'; Praveen 90+5'

Bangalore Football Stadium, Bangalore
1 February
IST

Bengaluru FC	2–2	RWF
Sourav 47', 86'	Report	Jayavandan 69' (pen.); Madan 71'

Bangalore Football Stadium, Bangalore
2 February
IST

ASC	2–0	DYES
Jotin Singh 19', 30'	Report

Bangalore Football Stadium, Bangalore
3 February
15:15 IST

MEG	2–1	CIL
Ayush 24'; Christopher 55'	Report	Dhanji 54' (o.g.)

Bangalore Football Stadium, Bangalore
4 February
IST

Bengaluru FC	3–2	South United
Vignesh 13'; Sourav 45'; Ajay Chetri 88' (pen.)	Report	Subhash 18' (pen.); Manivannan 27'

Bangalore Football Stadium, Bangalore
Referee: Arun
6 February
IST

Students Union	3–1	RWF
Praveen 50'; Nanda 58'; Michael 81'	Report	Samanth 74'

Bangalore Football Stadium, Bangalore
7 February
IST

CIL	1–1	ASC
Lokesh 71'	Report	Jotin Singh 27'

Bangalore Football Stadium, Bangalore
8 February
IST

MEG	2–0	DYES
Ramu 7'; Chiranjeevi 27'	Report

Bangalore Football Stadium, Bangalore
Referee: Vijay Kumar
11 February
IST

RWF	1–4	ASC
Prakash 81'	Report Archived 2024-12-27 at the Wayback Machine(subscription required)	Neeraj 17', 52', 78'; Jotin Singh 31'

Bangalore Football Stadium, Bangalore
12 February
IST

Students Union	2–2	MEG
Praveen 55'; Akshay 80'	Report	Christopher 7'; Dhanji Singh 36'

Bangalore Football Stadium, Bangalore
13 February
IST

Bengaluru FC	1–1	CIL
Beingaichho 82'	Report	Edjique Landry 26'

Bangalore Football Stadium, Bangalore
Referee: Suman
14 February
IST

South United	6–0	DYES
Subhash 9', 54'; Santhosh 17'; Satish 31'; Senthil 78', 83'	Report

Bangalore Football Stadium, Bangalore
17 February
IST

Bengaluru FC	2–3	Students Union
Beingaichho 15'; Sourav 56'	Report	Emmanuel 68', 79'; Naveen 89'

Bangalore Football Stadium, Bangalore
18 February
IST

AGORC	1–0	RWF
Pradeep Kumar 34'	Report

Bangalore Football Stadium, Bangalore
Referee: Vijay Kumar
19 February
IST

South United	6–0	ASC
Subhash 30', 69'; Satish 36', 82'; Solaimalai 85'; Manivannan 86'	Report

Bangalore Football Stadium, Bangalore
20 February
IST

Ozone FC	0–1	MEG
	Report	Liton Shil 81'

Bangalore Football Stadium, Bangalore
21 February
15:15 IST

Students Union	2–1	CIL
Sudhir 9'; Michael 29'	Report	Vignesh 90+1'

Bangalore Football Stadium, Bangalore
22 February
15:15 IST

AGORC	1–2	ASC
Nabeel 12'	Report	Sonu 86'; Neeraj Singh 90+2' (pen.)

Bangalore Football Stadium, Bangalore
Referee: Lawrence
24 February
15:15 IST

Bengaluru FC	2–1	MEG
Sampingiraj 15' (pen.); Beingaichho 71'	Report	Liton Shil 39'

Bangalore Football Stadium, Bangalore
25 February
15:15 IST

RWF	3–3	CIL
Satish Kumar 23'; Mithun 48', 83'	Report	Stalin 5'; Lokesh M. 7'; Vignesh 45+1'

Bangalore Football Stadium, Bangalore
26 February
15:15 IST

AGORC	2–4	Students Union
Nabeel 61', 84'	Report	Emmanuel 12', 64', 77'; Sudhir 13'

Bangalore Football Stadium, Bangalore
27 February
15:30 IST

Bengaluru FC	1–1	Ozone FC
Lalhlimpuia 39'	Report	Vivekananda 19'

Bangalore Football Stadium, Bangalore
28 February
15:30 IST

South United	2–2	CIL
Magesh 43', 66'	Report	Lokesh M. 39', 70'

Bangalore Football Stadium, Bangalore
Referee: Arun
1 March
15:30 IST

Ozone FC	0–0	ASC
	Report

Bangalore Football Stadium, Bangalore
2 March
15:30 IST

Bengaluru FC	3–0	AGORC
Doungel 30', 45+3' (pen.), 79'	Report

Bangalore Football Stadium, Bangalore
3 March
15:30 IST

MEG	3–2	RWF
Liton Shil 47'; Ayush 81'; Dipan Thapa 84'	Report	Nandakumar 2'; Shamanth 79'

Bangalore Football Stadium, Bangalore
4 March
15:30 IST

Ozone FC	6–2	DYES
Sabeeth 22' (pen.), 71', 78'; Mark Anthory 44'; Anup 62' (pen.), 90'	Report	Santosh 50'; Sarvana 85'

Bangalore Football Stadium, Bangalore
5 March
15:30 IST

South United	2–2	Students Union
Magesh 4'; Santhosh 88'	Report	Nanda 11'; Akshay 77'

Bangalore Football Stadium, Bangalore
6 March
15:30 IST

Bengaluru FC	1–0	DYES
Ajay Chhetri 6' (pen.)	Report

Bangalore Football Stadium, Bangalore
7 March
15:30 IST

Ozone FC	1–0	CIL
Vignesh G. 10'	Report

Bangalore Football Stadium, Bangalore
8 March
15:30 IST

RWF	2–0	DYES
Nandakumar 44', 48'	Report Archived 2025-10-18 at the Wayback Machine(subscription required)

Bangalore Football Stadium, Bangalore
Referee: Stanley Jones
10 March
15:30 IST

ASC	4–1	Students Union
Sreejith 22'; Diwakar 24'; Neeraj 83', 90+1'	Report	Nanda 51'

Bangalore Football Stadium, Bangalore
11 March
15:30 IST

Ozone FC	3–1	AGORC
Vignesh D. 28'; Anto Xavier 37', 74'	Report	Nabeel 79'

Bangalore Football Stadium, Bangalore
13 March
15:30 IST

CIL	3–0	DYES
Stalin 29', 42', 45+1'	Report

Bangalore Football Stadium, Bangalore
14 March
15:30 IST

Ozone FC	5–0	RWF
Madan 11', 64' (o.g.); Shilton 45+2'; Kapil 81', 87'	Report

Bangalore Football Stadium, Bangalore
15 March
15:30 IST

South United	2–1	AGORC
Subhash 54'; Pawan 73'	Report Archived 2024-12-27 at the Wayback Machine(subscription required)	Nabeel 90+1'

Bangalore Football Stadium, Bangalore
16 March
15:30 IST

ASC	1–3	MEG
Deepak Singh 21'	Report	Liton Shil 36'; Dipan Thapa 67'; Christopher 76' (pen.)

Bangalore Football Stadium, Bangalore
Referee: Sugandher
17 March
15:30 IST

Ozone FC	3–1	South United
Anto Xavier 31'; Akshay 35'; Vivekananda 42'	Report	Mani Dinho 23'

Bangalore Football Stadium, Bangalore
Referee: Suresh Babu
18 March
15:30 IST

MEG	3–2	AGORC
Asif 11'; Christopher 39'; Vishnu 78'	Report	Nabeel 13', 81'

Bangalore Football Stadium, Bangalore

=== Results table ===
Home \ Away	AGO	ASC	BFC	CIL	DYE	MEG	OFC	RWF	SUFC	SU
AGORC		1–2	0–3	0–3	2–2	2–3	1–3	1–0	1–2	2–4
ASC			3–1	1–1	2–0	1–3	0–0	4–1	0–6	4–1
Bengaluru FC				1–1	1–0	2–1	1–1	2–2	3–2	2–3
CIL					3–0	1–2	0–1	3–3	2–2	1–2
DYES						0–2	2–6	0–2	0–6	0–2
MEG							1–0	3–2	2–1	2–2
Ozone FC								5–0	3–1	2–3
RWF									2–2	1–3
South United										2–2
Students Union										

Source: GCSStars
Legend: Blue = home team win; Yellow = draw; Red = away team win.

== Season statistics ==
=== Top scorers ===
Rank	Player	Club	Goals
1	Dada Nabeel	AGORC	8
2	Subhash	South United	7
2	Emmanuel	Students Union	7
2	Jotin Singh	ASC	7
5	Neeraj Singh	ASC	6
6	Nandakumar	RWF	5
7	Edjique Landry	CIL	4
7	Magesh	Students Union	4
7	Neeraj Singh	ASC	4
7	Praveen	Students Union	4
7	Liton Shil	MEG	4

== Awards ==
Award	Recipient
Best Goalkeeper	Nardesh (Students Union)
Best Goal	Nanda (Students Union)
Best Playmaker	Sukesh Leon (Madras Engineer Group)
Top goalscorer	Dada Nabeel (8 goals)
