= 2025–26 BDFA Super Division =

BDFA Super Division
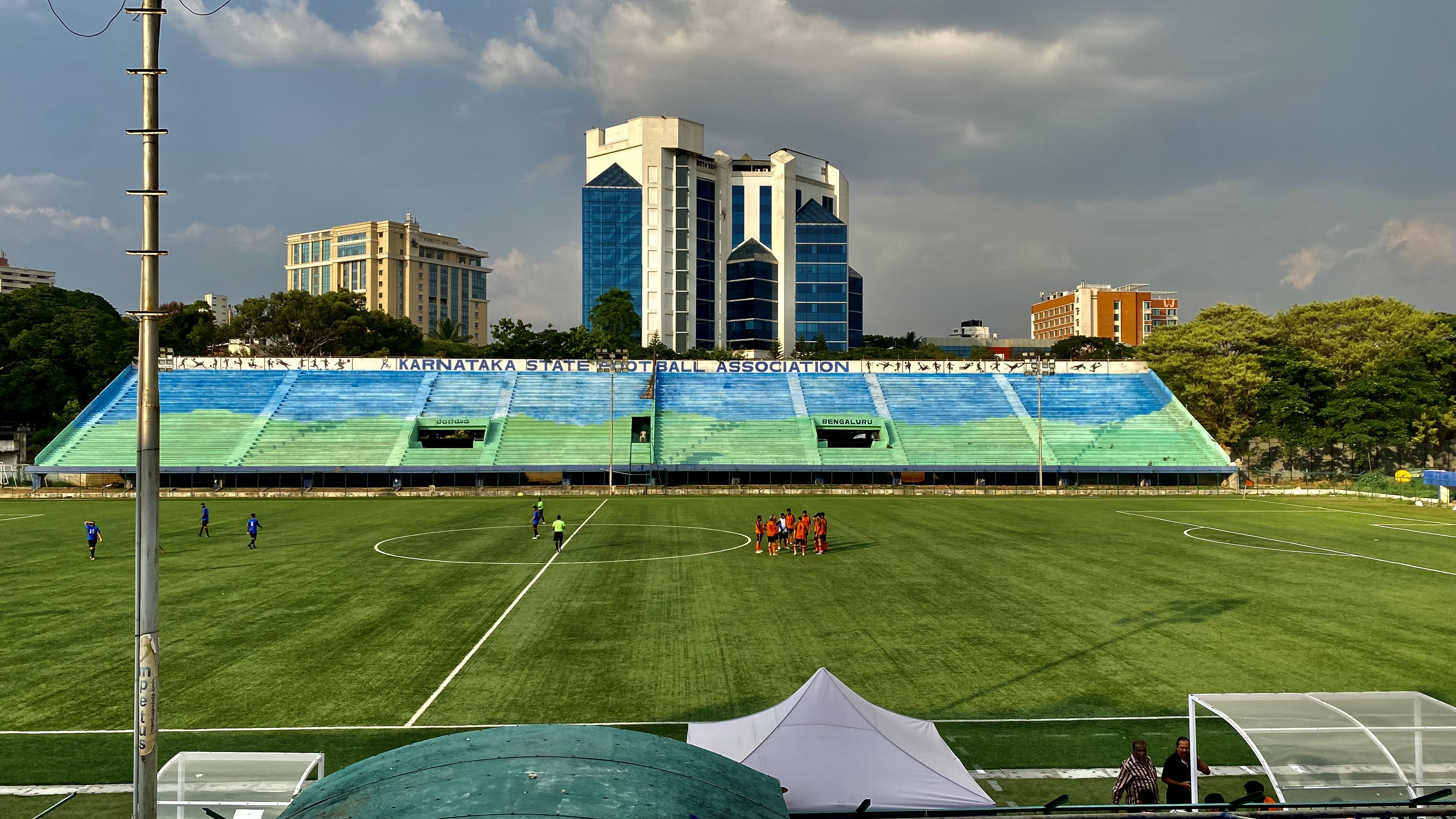
- Bangalore Football Stadium on a matchday in May 2023.
- Season: 2025–26
- Dates: 10 September 2025 — 24 November 2025
- Champions: Kickstart FC
- Promoted: Kickstart FC
- Relegated: Students Union FC and Bharat Bengaluru FC
- Matches: 171
- Goals: 528 (3.09 per match)
- Top goalscorer: Ngairangbam Rakesh Singh (20 goals; Kickstart FC)
- All statistics correct as of 30 April 2026.

The 2025–26 BDFA Super Division was the 23rd season of the BDFA Super Division, the fifth-tier league in the Indian football system, and Karnataka's top-tier football league. FC Agniputhra were the defending champions, having won the 2024-25 BDFA Super Division. Nineteen teams competed in the league in the 2025-26 season, one more than the previous season.

After being runners-up of 2020–21 and 2024–25 seasons, this season saw Kickstart FC clinching their first ever Super Division title.

== Changes from previous season ==
=== Relegated to A Division ===
- Bangalore United FC
- Real Chikkamagaluru

=== Withdrew ===
- Bangalore Independents

=== Promoted from A Division ===
- Bangalore Dream United
- Bangalore City FC

=== Direct entrants ===
- Bharat Bengaluru FC
- United Stars FC

== Teams ==
Location of the host venue of the 2025-26 BDFA Super Division.

Competing teams in the 2025-26 BDFA Super Division League
Team	Location	Region	Stadium
ASC & C FC	Dommaluru	Central	Bangalore Football Stadium
Bangalore City FC	Kasturinagara	East	Bangalore Football Stadium
Bangalore Dream United FC	Unknown	—N/a	Bangalore Football Stadium
Bengaluru FC B	Halasuru	Central	Bangalore Football Stadium
Bharat Bengaluru FC	Fraser Town	North	Bangalore Football Stadium
FC Agniputhra	Basavanagara	East	Bangalore Football Stadium
FC Bengaluru United	Unknown	—N/a	Bangalore Football Stadium
FC Real Bengaluru	Yemaluru	East	Bangalore Football Stadium
HAL SC	Vibhutipura	East	Bangalore Football Stadium
Kickstart	Horamavu	East	Bangalore Football Stadium
Kodagu FC	Kushalanagar, Kodagu district	—N/a	Bangalore Football Stadium
MEG & C FC	Kasturinagara	Central	Bangalore Football Stadium
Parikrma FC	Byatarayanapura	North	Bangalore Football Stadium
Rebels FC	Mahalakshmi Layout	West	Bangalore Football Stadium
Roots FC	Dommaluru	Central	Bangalore Football Stadium
SC Bengaluru	VV puram	Central	Bangalore Football Stadium
South United	Halasuru	Central	Bangalore Football Stadium
Students Union FC	Unknown	—N/a	Bangalore Football Stadium
United Stars FC	Malleshwaram	West	Bangalore Football Stadium

== Regular season ==
=== League table ===
Pos	Team	Pld	W	D	L	GF	GA	GD	Pts	Qualification or relegation
1	Kickstart (C)	18	15	3	0	43	8	+35	48	Champions and promotion to 2026–27 I-League 3
2	FC Bengaluru United^{IL2}	18	13	3	2	40	3	+37	42	
3	Kodagu FC	18	12	3	3	52	16	+36	39	
4	Bengaluru B^{ISL}	18	11	5	2	45	16	+29	38	
5	South United	18	10	4	4	36	16	+20	34	
6	SC Bengaluru^{IL2}	18	10	4	4	27	19	+8	34	
7	FC Agniputhra^{IL3}	18	7	4	7	33	23	+10	25	
8	United Stars	18	7	4	7	30	35	−5	25	
9	MEG & C FC	18	6	6	6	32	33	−1	24	
10	Parikrma FC	18	6	5	7	23	28	−5	23	
11	FC Real Bengaluru	18	6	4	8	23	33	−10	22	
12	Rebels FC	18	7	1	10	21	31	−10	22	
13	Bangalore City	18	6	3	9	20	27	−7	21	
14	ASC & C FC	18	5	6	7	21	30	−9	21	
15	Roots FC	18	5	5	8	13	18	−5	20	
16	HAL SC	18	4	3	11	16	27	−11	15	
17	Bangalore Dream United	18	4	2	12	22	47	−25	14	
18	Students Union (R)	18	3	1	14	21	58	−37	10	Relegation to 2026–27 BDFA A Division
19	Bharat Bengaluru (R)	18	1	0	17	10	60	−50	3	Relegation to 2026–27 BDFA A Division

Source: The Away End
Rules for classification: 1) points; 2) goal difference; 3) number of goals scored
(C) Champions; (R) Relegated

== Awards ==
Champions Kickstart FC were awarded the George Hoover Trophy while the Runners-up FC Bengaluru United were presented with thw GMH Basha Cup. Individual awards for the season are as follows:

Award	Winner	Team
Best Goalkeeper	Srijith R	FC Bengaluru United
Best Defender	Arjun Gouda M	SC Bengaluru
Best Midfielder	Shreyas Ketkar	Bengaluru FC B
Top Scorer	Nagairangbam Rakesh Singh (20 Goals)	Kickstart FC

== See also ==
- Men
  - 2025–26 Indian Super League (Tier I)
  - 2025–26 Indian Football League (Tier II)
  - 2025–26 I-League 2 (Tier III)
  - 2025–26 I-League 3 (Tier IV)
  - 2025–26 Indian State Leagues (Tier V)
  - 2025-26 Super Cup
  - 2025 Durand Cup
- Women
  - 2025–26 Indian Women's League
  - 2025–26 Indian Women's League 2
