= 2022–23 BDFA Super Division =

BDFA Super Division
- Season: 2022–23
- Dates: August – December 2022
- Champions: SC Bengaluru (1st title)
- Promoted: SC Bengaluru; Kickstart FC
- Relegated: Bangalore Eagles; ADE
- Matches played: 6
- Goals scored: 29 (4.83 per match)
- Biggest away win: Jawahar Union 0–17 Bengaluru United
- Highest scoring: Jawahar Union 0–17 Bengaluru United

The 2022–23 BDFA Super Division was the 20th season of the BDFA Super Division, the fourth tier league in India, and Karnataka's top-tier football league. Bengaluru United were the defending champions.

== Changes from last season ==
=== Relegated to A Division ===
- ADE (reinstated for league expansion)

=== Promoted from A Division ===
- Rebels FC
- Friends United FC

=== Direct entrants ===
- Roots FC
- FC Agniputhra
- SC Bengaluru

== Regular season ==
=== League table ===
Pos	Team	Pld	W	D	L	GF	GA	GD	Pts	Qualification or relegation
1	SC Bengaluru (C, P)	18	15	1	2	53	11	+42	46	Champions and Qualification to 2023-24 I-League 3
2	Bengaluru United	18	14	3	1	66	12	+54	45	
3	Kickstart (P)	18	13	3	2	54	17	+37	42	Qualification to 2023-24 I-League 3
4	Rebels	18	11	3	4	41	17	+24	36	
5	Bengaluru B	18	10	3	5	52	16	+36	33	
6	Students Union	18	9	4	5	33	24	+9	31	
7	Deccan	18	8	5	5	31	19	+12	29	
8	Bangalore Independents	18	9	1	8	35	29	+6	28	
9	MEG	18	8	4	6	25	20	+5	28	
10	ASC	18	5	7	6	33	29	+4	22	
11	Friends United	18	5	7	6	28	36	−8	22	
12	Bangalore Dream United	18	6	4	8	24	41	−17	22	
13	Agniputhra	18	6	3	9	29	35	−6	21	
14	Kodagu	18	5	5	8	23	20	+3	20	
15	Roots	18	5	5	8	18	23	−5	20	
16	Bangalore United FC	18	4	3	11	18	47	−29	15	
17	Young Challengers	18	4	1	13	13	56	−43	13	
18	Bangalore Eagles (R)	18	1	4	13	11	50	−39	7	Relegation to 2023-24 BDFA A Division
19	ADE (R)	18	0	0	18	7	92	−85	0	Relegation to 2023-24 BDFA A Division
20	Jawahar Union (W)	0	0	0	0	0	0	0	0	Withdrew

Rules for classification: 1) points; 2) goal difference; 3) number of goals scored
(C) Champions; (P) Promoted; (R) Relegated; (W) ?

== Matches ==
August
Match	Date	Home	Result	Away	Ref.
1	23 August	Jawahar Union	0–17*	Bengaluru United	
2	23 August	Bangalore Eagles	0–2	Bangalore United FC	
3	23 August	MEG	0–1	Roots	
4	24 August	ADE	0–2	Students Union	
5	24 August	ASC	1–1	Friends United	
6	24 August	Rebels FC	2–3	SC Bengaluru	
7	26 August	Kickstart	1–0	Deccan	
8	26 August	Bangalore Dream United	1–1	Kodagu	
9	27 August	Bengaluru B	8–0	Young Challengers	
10	27 August	Bangalore Independents	2–1	Agniputhra	
11	28 August	Bengaluru United	0–0	MEG	
12	30 August	Kickstart	6–0	Bangalore United	
13	30 August	Roots	1–1	Deccan	
14	30 August	Kodagu	Postponed	Jawahar Union	
15	31 August	Rebels	2–1	Bengaluru B	
16	31 August	Young Challengers	2–2	Bangalore Eagles	
17	31 August	Students Union	2–1	Bangalore Independents	
September
Match	Date	Home	Result	Away	Ref.
18	1 September	SC Bengaluru	0–1	Friends United	
19	1 September	ADE	0–5	Bangalore Dream United	
20	6 September	Agniputhra	2–1	ASC	
21	6 September	Bengaluru United	6–0	Bangalore United FC	

^{*}Jawahar Union withdrew

== See also ==
- 2022–23 Indian State Leagues
  - 2022–23 Chennai Senior Division
  - 2022–23 Kerala Premier League
