= Sivasakthi Narayanan =

Indian footballer

Personal information
- Full name: Sivasakthi Narayanan
- Date of birth: 9 July 2001 (age 25)
- Place of birth: Karaikudi, Tamil Nadu, India
- Height: 1.65 m (5 ft 5 in)
- Position: Striker

Team information
- Current team: Bengaluru
- Number: 39

Youth career
- 2013–2018: Nobal Football Academy
- 2018–2020: Raman Vijayan Soccer School

Senior career*
Years	Team	Apps	(Gls)
2020–2021	Bengaluru B	11	(18)
2021–	Bengaluru	46	(8)

International career^{‡}
2023–2024	India U23	4	(0)
- * Club domestic league appearances and goals as of 19:00, 11 April 2024 (UTC) ‡ National team caps and goals as of 19:00, 25 March 2024 (UTC)

Sivasakthi Narayanan (born 9 July 2001) is an Indian professional footballer who plays as a forward for Indian Super League club Bengaluru.

== Club career ==
=== Youth ===
Sivasakthi's youth career began when he was picked up by a NFA team during trials in Karaikudi. Sivasakthi was scouted by Hamed Vijan Soccer School and he was the top scorer in the 2018-19 season of Elite League with 22 goals for the club. He then joined Bengaluru FC's B team, where he played for the club in the 2020-21 Bangalore Super Division. He emerged as the top goal scorer after scoring 15 goals for the club, including two hat-tricks.

=== Bengaluru FC ===
On 22 April 2021, Bengaluru FC announced their squad for their AFC Cup campaign, which saw the 20-year-old getting maiden call up for the senior team. He made his senior team debut when he replaced Suresh Singh in the game against Bashundhara Kings at the group stage of 2021 AFC Cup. He scored his first goal for Bengaluru, ten minutes after being substituted against Maziya S&RC.

== Personal life ==
Hailing from a football frenzy district of Karaikudi, Sivasakthi picked up football as an interest and went on to get selected for the trials held in his hometown, when he was in 7th grade at school. When he and his friends began to pick their favourite ISL teams, Sivasakthi chose to be a fan of Bengaluru FC. Sivasakthi lost his father when he was young and is now survived by his mother, who according to Sivasakthi, raised and supported him to follow his passion. During the 2020-21 Bangalore Super Division season, Bengaluru FC B team's Head Coach, Sandesh Bhoite said that Sivasakthi is short, lanky and has the kind of core weakness that gets him past even the smallest challenges.

== Career statistics ==
=== Club ===
As of 23 August 2024

Appearances and goals by club, season and competition
Club	Season	League			National Cup (Note: Includes Super Cup)		Asia		Other		Total	
Club	Season	Division	Apps	Goals	Apps	Goals	Apps	Goals	Apps	Goals	Apps	Goals
Bengaluru B	2020–21	Bangalore Super Division	11	15	—		—		—		11	15
Bengaluru	2021–22	Indian Super League	7	0	—		2 (Note: Appearances in AFC Cup)	1	5 (Note: Appearances in Durand Cup)	3	14	4
Bengaluru	2022–23	Indian Super League	21	6	2	0	—		6	5	29	11
Bengaluru	2023–24	Indian Super League	18	2	3	0	—		—		21	2
Bengaluru	2024–25	Indian Super League	0	0	0	0	—		3	0	3	0
Bengaluru	Total		46	8	5	0	2	1	11	8	64	17
Career total			57	23	5	0	2	1	14	8	78	32

== Honours ==
Bengaluru

- Indian Super League runner-up: 2022–23
- Durand Cup: 2022
- Indian Super Cup runner-up: 2023

Individual

- Indian Super League Emerging Player of the League: 2022–23
- 2018–19 Indian Elite League – Top goal scorer
- 2020–21 Bangalore Super Division – Top goal scorer and Best forward of the season award
- FPAI Young Player of the Year: 2023
