= Vijay Nagappan =

Indian footballer

Personal information
- Full name: Vijay Nagappan
- Date of birth: 13 July 1995 (age 31)
- Place of birth: Chennai, Tamil Nadu
- Positions: Striker; attacking midfielder

Team information
- Current team: Kickstart
- Number: 17

Senior career*
Years	Team	Apps	(Gls)
2019–2021	Chennai City	15	(2)
2022–2023	Kenkre	8	(1)
2023–	Kickstart		
- * Club domestic league appearances and goals

Vijay Nagappan (born 13 July 1995) is an Indian professional footballer who plays as a forward for Kickstart in the I-League 3.

== Early life ==
Vijay was born on 13 July 1995 in Chennai, Tamil Nadu.

== Career ==
=== Chennai City FC ===
==== 2019–20 ====
Vijay signed his first senior contract with Chennai City FC that competes in I-League. He was signed for 2019–20 I-League season. Vijay played his debut match on 31 January 2020 against the Kolkata giants Mohun Bagan. Vijay came in as a substitute for Jan Muzangu in the 61st minute. He scored his debut goal in his debut match in 65th minute while Chennai City was trailing 3–0. The match was finished with the scoreline 2–3, where Mohun Bagan took the win. Vijay started for the first time in line-up in the next matchday against Indian Arrows on 5 February 2020. The match finished 1–0 in favour of Chennai City. Vijay started again in the next match against Churchill Brothers on 9 February 2020 where he found his first assist in his career for the goal set by Jan Muzangu. The match ended 1–2 in favour of Chennai. Vijay started in the next match against South Indian rivals Gokulam Kerala on 12 February 2020 which they lost 1–0. Vijay consecutively started for the team for a streak of 7 games and started as a substitute in his debut which make up all his 8 appearances for the club in the 2019–20 I-League season. Vijay also appeared for the club in their AFC Cup 2020 group stage match against Maldivian football club Maziya S&RC on 11 March 2020. The match resulted in a 2–2 draw.

==== 2020–21 ====
Vijay stayed at the club for the 2020-21 I-League season. He played his first match of the season in the club's first match of the season against Gokulam Kerala FC on 9 January 2021. He was started in the lineup for the match. Vijay scored a goal in the 50th minute of the match. The match ended 1–2 in favour of Chennai City.

== Career statistics ==
=== Club ===
As of 15 April 2022

Club	Season	League			Cup		AFC		Total	
Club	Season	Division	Apps	Goals	Apps	Goals	Apps	Goals	Apps	Goals
Chennai City	2019–20	I-League	8	1	0	0	1 (Note: Appearance(s) in AFC Cup)	0	9	1
Chennai City	2020–21	I-League	7	1	0	0	–		7	1
Kenkre	2021–22	I-League	8	1	0	0	–		8	1
Career total			23	3	0	0	1	0	24	3
