= 2014–15 BDFA Super Division =

BDFA Super Division
- Season: 2014–15
- Champions: ASC (1st title)
- Relegated: ADE
- Matches: 36
- Goals: 128 (3.56 per match)

The 2014–15 BDFA Super Division was the twelfth season of the BDFA Super Division which is the third tier of the Indian football system and the top tier of the Karnataka football system. ASC won the championship. It was their first title.

== Teams ==
Pos	Team	Pld	W	D	L	GF	GA	GD	Pts	Qualification or relegation
1	ASC (C)	8	7	0	1	26	6	+20	21	Champions
2	South United	8	6	1	1	24	13	+11	19	
3	CIL	8	4	2	2	11	10	+1	14	
4	Bengaluru FC	8	4	1	3	15	12	+3	13	
5	Students Union	8	3	1	4	18	16	+2	10	
6	MEG	8	2	3	3	9	14	−5	9	
7	RWF	8	2	1	5	11	19	−8	7	
8	DYES	8	1	2	5	11	20	−9	5	
9	ADE (R)	8	1	1	6	7	22	−15	4	Relegated to A Division

Source: GCS Stars
Rules for classification: 1) points; 2) goal difference; 3) number of goals scored.
(C) Champions; (R) Relegated

== Results ==
Home \ Away	ADE	ASC	BFC	CIL	DYES	MEG	RWF	SUFC	SU
ADE		0–7	2–1	1–1	1–4	1–2	1–2	1–4	0–1
ASC			0–1	3–1	4–1	3–0	4–2	3–0	2–1
Bengaluru FC				1–2	3–0	2–2	3–1	2–4	2–1
CIL					1–0	1–0	3–0	1–1	1–4
DYES						1–1	3–3	1–3	1–4
MEG							1–0	1–4	2–2
RWF								0–3	3–1
South United									5–4
Students Union									

Updated to match(es) played on 28 March 2015. Source: GCSStars
Legend: Blue = home team win; Yellow = draw; Red = away team win.
