= 2015–16 BDFA Super Division =

BDFA Super Division
- Season: 2015–16
- Champions: Ozone (1st title)
- Relegated: Income Tax; SAI

The 2015–16 BDFA Super Division is the thirteenth season of the BDFA Super Division which is the third tier of the Indian football system and the top tier of the Karnataka football system. SAI and Income Tax were promoted from BDFA 'A' Division, whereas Ozone FC, a new team launched by Ozone group, also competed in the season. Ozone emerged the champions and Income Tax and SAI were relegated to A division.

== Teams ==
- ASC
- Bengaluru FC
- CIL
- DYES
- Income Tax
- MEG
- Ozone FC
- RWF
- SAI
- South United
- Students Union

== Table ==
| Pos | Team | Pld | W | D | L | GF | GA | GD | Pts | Qualification or relegation |
|---|---|---|---|---|---|---|---|---|---|---|
| 1 | Ozone FC (C) | 9 | 8 | 1 | 0 | 27 | 7 | +20 | 25 | Champions |
| 2 | South United | 10 | 7 | 2 | 1 | 18 | 4 | +14 | 23 | |
| 3 | MEG | 9 | 5 | 3 | 1 | 16 | 10 | +6 | 18 | |
| 4 | Bengaluru FC | 10 | 4 | 2 | 4 | 25 | 11 | +14 | 14 | |
| 5 | ASC | 9 | 4 | 1 | 4 | 23 | 12 | +11 | 13 | |
| 6 | RWF | 9 | 4 | 0 | 5 | 13 | 24 | −11 | 12 | |
| 7 | Students Union | 9 | 3 | 1 | 5 | 6 | 10 | −4 | 10 | |
| 8 | DYES | 10 | 2 | 4 | 4 | 9 | 18 | −9 | 10 | |
| 9 | CIL | 9 | 2 | 2 | 5 | 9 | 14 | −5 | 8 | |
| 10 | SAI (R) | 10 | 2 | 2 | 6 | 11 | 19 | −8 | 8 | Relegated to A Division |
| 11 | Income Tax (R) | 10 | 1 | 2 | 7 | 8 | 36 | −28 | 5 | Relegated to A Division |

Source: GCS Stars
Rules for classification: 1) points; 2) goal difference; 3) number of goals scored.
(C) Champions; (R) Relegated

== Results ==
| Home \ Away | ASC | BFC | CIL | DYES | IT | MEG | OFC | RWF | SAI | SUFC | SU |
|---|---|---|---|---|---|---|---|---|---|---|---|
| ASC | | 0–1 | 1–1 | 5–0 | 4–1 | 0–1 | 0–3 | 7–1 | 4–1 | 2–3 | 2–0 |
| Bengaluru FC | | | 0–1 | 1–1 | 11–0 | 6–1 | 1–1 | 1–2 | 2–3 | 0–2 | 2–0 |
| CIL | | | | 2–3 | 0–0 | 1–3 | 2–4 | | 2–0 | 0–2 | 0–1 |
| DYES | | | | | 1–2 | 0–0 | 3–0 | 0–2 | 1–1 | 1–1 | 2–1 |
| Income Tax | | | | | | 1–4 | 2–4 | 1–0 | 1–1 | 0–7 | 1–3 |
| MEG | | | | | | | 2–3 | 4–1 | 3–1 | 0–0 | 0–0 |
| Ozone FC | | | | | | | | 7–2 | 1–0 | 1–0 | 3–0 |
| RWF | | | | | | | | | 3–4 | 0–1 | 1–0 |
| SAI | | | | | | | | | | 0–1 | 0–1 |
| South United | | | | | | | | | | | 1–0 |
| Students Union | | | | | | | | | | | |

Updated to match(es) played on 14 March 2016. Source: GCSStars
Legend: Blue = home team win; Yellow = draw; Red = away team win.
