= Gunashekar Vignesh =

Indian footballer (born 1988)

Personal information
- Full name: Gunashekar Vignesh
- Date of birth: 30 September 1988 (age 38)
- Place of birth: Bangalore, Karnataka, India
- Height: 1.73 m (5 ft 8 in)
- Position: Midfielder

Team information
- Current team: Bengaluru United
- Number: 30

Senior career*
Years	Team	Apps	(Gls)
2008–2011	Pune		
2011–2012	Chirag United Kerala		
2012–2014	South United		
2014–2015	Bharat	11	(0)
2015	Delhi Dynamos	0	(0)
2016–2018	Ozone		
2019	Bangalore Eagles		
2020–	Bengaluru United		
- * Club domestic league appearances and goals as of 20:29, 22 March 2018 (UTC)

Gunashekar Vignesh (born 30 September 1988) is an Indian professional footballer who plays as a midfielder for Bengaluru United in the I-League 2nd Division.

== Career ==
Born in Karnataka, Bangalore, Vignesh began his career with I-League club Pune before moving to Chirag United Kerala in 2011. After spending a season in Kerala, Vignesh signed with South United. After spending time with South United, Vignesh returned to the I-League, signing with Bharat. After spending a season with Bharat, Vignesh signed for Ozone of the Bangalore Super Division.

On 22 March 2018, Vignesh was captain of the Karnataka squad for the Santosh Trophy as they defeated Goa in their first match. He also scored the first goal for his state in the 54th minute as Karnataka won 4–1.

In 2019, Vignesh played for Bangalore Eagles in the Bangalore Super Division. A few months later, Vignesh began playing for Bengaluru United in the I-League 2nd Division. For the 2019–20 season, Vignesh was the captain of Bengaluru United.
