= KGF Academy =

Indian association football club in Bangalore

- Founded: 2011
- Ground: Bangalore Football Stadium (not used for I-League 2nd division matches but for local league matches)
- Capacity: 15,000
- League: I-League 2nd Division
- 2013: Second season

KGF Academy (formerly known as BEML FC) is an Indian professional football club from Bangalore. Formed in 2011 went straight into professional football and got accepted into the I-League 2nd Division, the second tier of football in India.

== History ==
KGF Academy was founded in 2011 in Bangalore. In January 2012 they were officially certified by the All India Football Federation to participate in the I-League 2nd Division, the second tier of football in India.

== Honours ==
- BDFA Super Division
  - Champions (1): 2011–12

== See also ==
- List of football clubs in India
