= 2008–09 BDFA Super Division =

BDFA Super Division
- Season: 2008–09
- Champions: HASC (6th title)
- Highest scoring: BEML (Earth Movers) 12–0 Southern Blues (21 March 2009)

The 2008–09 BDFA Super Division was the eighth season of the BDFA Super Division, the third tier of the Indian football system and the top tier of the Karnataka football system. It began on 19 February 2009 and concluded on 9 May.

A total of 15 teams competed in the league. HASC emerged as champion.
