= Robert Primus =

Trinidadian international footballer (born 1990)

Personal information
- Full name: Robert Alfred Junior Primus
- Date of birth: 10 November 1990 (age 36)
- Place of birth: Morvant, Trinidad and Tobago
- Height: 1.91 m (6 ft 3 in)
- Position: Centre-back

Team information
- Current team: Port of Spain
- Number: 21

Senior career*
Years	Team	Apps	(Gls)
2008–2010	San Juan Jabloteh	11	(5)
2011–2015	Aktobe	56	(6)
2016	Morvant Caledonia United		
2016–2017	Central		
2018	Slutsk	11	(0)
2019	Minerva Punjab	0	(0)
2019–2020	Churchill Brothers	12	(2)
2020–2021	Bengaluru United	4	(0)
2022	Aizawl	12	(0)
2022	Druk Lhayul		
2023	Port of Spain		
2024	Police		
2025–	Port of Spain		

International career^{‡}
2007	Trinidad and Tobago U17	3	(0)
2009	Trinidad and Tobago U20	3	(0)
2009–	Trinidad and Tobago	8	(0)
- * Club domestic league appearances and goals as of 31 December 2024 ‡ National team caps and goals as of 9 June 2021

Robert Primus (born 10 November 1990) is a Trinidadian professional footballer who plays as a defender for Port of Spain.

== Club career ==
Primus made his senior debut for San Juan Jabloteh in the 2008 season.

=== Aktobe ===
In February 2011, Primus moved to Kazakhstan Premier League side Aktobe, signing a three-year contract.

After tearing his anterior Cruciate ligament against FC Astana on 21 September 2013 against FC Astana, Primus underwent surgery in the USA which ruled him out for the remainder of the 2013 season and the first of the 2014 season. In his first game back following the surgery and rehabilitation, Primus injured his Cruciate ligaments again against FC Kaisar on 22 June 2014, ruling him out for the remainder of the season.

=== Morvant Caledonia United ===
In February 2016, Primus returned to Trinidad and Tobago, signing a contract till the end of the 2015–16 season with Morvant Caledonia United.

=== Central ===
In summer 2016, Primus left Morvant Caledonia United and joined Central.

=== Slutsk ===
In March 2018, Primus joined Belarusian club FC Slutsk.

=== India ===
In March 2019 he signed for Indian club Minerva Punjab. In September 2019 he moved to Churchill Brothers.

In September 2020, he signed with FC Bengaluru United. He with his compatriot Daniel Carr won the 2020–21 Bangalore Super Division tournament.

=== Aizawl ===
On 22 February 2022, Primus moved to another I-League club Aizawl on a season-long deal.

He made his debut for the club, on 3 March 2022, against Mohammedan, which ended in a 2–0 defeat.

== International career ==
Primus represented the respective youth teams of Trinidad and Tobago at the 2007 FIFA U-17 World Cup and the 2009 FIFA U-20 World Cup. He made his debut for the senior team on 18 March 2009, in a friendly game against Panama.

== Career statistics ==
=== Club ===
As of 1 May 2022

Club	Season	League			Cup		Continental		Total	
Club	Season	Division	Apps	Goals	Apps	Goals	Apps	Goals	Apps	Goals
Aktobe	2011	Premier League	22	1	0	0	4 (Note: Appearance(s) in UEFA Europa League)	0	26	1
Aktobe	2012	Premier League	12	1	4 (Note: Appearance(s) in Kazakhstan Cup)	1	5	0	21	2
Aktobe	2013	Premier League	21	4	2	0	8	0	31	4
Aktobe	2014	Premier League	1	0	0	0	–		1	0
Slutsk	2018	Premier League	11	0	2 (Note: Appearance(s) in Belarusian Cup)	0	–		13	0
Minerva Punjab	2018–19	I-League	0	0	0	0	6 (Note: Appearance(s) in AFC Cup)	0	6	0
Churchill Brothers	2019–20	I-League	12	2	0	0	–		12	2
Bengaluru United	2020	I-League 2nd Division	4	0	0	0	–		4	0
Aizawl	2021–22	I-League	12	0	0	0	–		12	0
Career total			95	8	8	1	23	0	126	9

=== International ===
As of match played 9 September 2013

Trinidad and Tobago football team
Year	Apps	Goals
2009	2	0
2010	1	0
2012	1	0
2013	2	0
Total	6	0
