= 2020–21 BDFA Super Division =

BDFA Super Division
- Season: 2020–21
- Dates: 12 January 2021 – 16 March 2021
- Champions: Bengaluru United (1st title)
- Relegated: Income Tax
- Matches played: 74
- Goals scored: 277 (3.74 per match)
- Top goalscorer: Sivasakthi Narayanan (15 goals)
- Biggest home win: Kickstart 10–0 Income Tax
- Biggest away win: Income Tax 0–11 FC Deccan
- Highest scoring: Income Tax 0–11 FC Deccan

The 2020–21 BDFA Super Division was the 18th season of the BDFA Super Division, the fourth tier of the Indian association football system and the top tier of the Karnataka football system. The season started on 12 January 2021. Bengaluru FC 'B' were the defending champions. All games were played at Bangalore Football Stadium. The league was contested by top 12 teams from 2019–20 season as well as Young Challengers and FC Deccan who were promoted from 2019–20 BDFA 'A' division. AGORC were relegated to 2020–21 BDFA A Division.

== Teams ==
Thirteen teams competed in the league.

After withdrawal of Ozone FC and South United FC from the league, Students Union who were supposed to be relegated along with last placed AGORC FC were allowed to continue in the top division while Young Challengers and FC Deccan joined after gaining promotion from BDFA A Division League.

Club
Army Service Corps (ASC)
ADE
Bangalore Dream United
Bangalore Eagles
Bangalore Independents
Bengaluru FC 'B'
Bengaluru United
FC Deccan
Income Tax
Kickstart FC
Madras Engineer Group (MEG)
Students Union
Young Challengers

=== Foreign players ===
Team	Player 1	Player 2
ASC		
ADE		
Bangalore Dream United		
Bangalore Eagles		
Bangalore Independents		
Bengaluru FC B		
Bengaluru United	(Trinidad and Tobago) Daniel Carr	(Trinidad and Tobago) Robert Primus
FC Deccan		
Income Tax		
Kickstart FC	(Nigeria) Uzochi Emmanuel Echebiri	
MEG		
Students Union	(Japan) Taiki Yoshida	
Young Challengers		

== Table ==
Pos	Team	Pld	W	D	L	GF	GA	GD	Pts	Qualification or relegation
1	Bengaluru United (C)	12	10	1	1	38	7	+31	31	Champions and qualification for 2021 I-League Qualifiers
2	Bengaluru FC B	12	10	0	2	38	10	+28	30	
3	MEG	12	8	2	2	28	17	+11	26	
4	Kickstart FC	12	8	1	3	35	7	+28	25	Nominated for 2021 I-League Qualifiers
5	Bangalore Eagles	12	7	3	2	19	11	+8	24	
6	Students Union	12	6	2	4	18	15	+3	20	
7	ASC	12	5	3	4	20	12	+8	18	
8	FC Deccan	12	4	3	5	28	18	+10	15	
9	Bangalore Independents	12	3	2	7	15	21	−6	11	
10	Young Challengers	12	3	1	8	21	30	−9	10	
11	Bangalore Dream United	12	2	2	8	6	27	−21	8	
12	ADE	12	1	2	9	4	30	−26	5	
13	Income Tax	12	0	0	12	7	72	−65	0	Relegation to BDFA A Division

Source: Garden City Soccer
Rules for classification: 1) points; 2) goal difference; 3) number of goals scored
(C) Champions

== Matches ==
=== January ===
11 January 2021 1	Kickstart FC	2–1	Young Challengers FC	Bangalore
	Magesh Selva 43'; Sudheer Kotikela 48'	Report	Ankith P 65'	Stadium: Bangalore Football Stadium

11 January 2021 2	ASC	2–0	FC Deccan	Bangalore
	Dip Majumder 40'; Gautam Singh 87'	Report		Stadium: Bangalore Football Stadium

12 January 2021 3	FC Bengaluru United	8–1	Income Tax FC	Bangalore
	Asrar Rehber 23' (pen.); Ronaldo Oliveira 32', 39'; Jaison Jordon Vaz 64' *Brandon Green 78'; Chaitan Komar Pant 8', 90'; Naro Hari Shrestha 88'	Report	Austin 21'	Stadium: Bangalore Football Stadium

12 January 2021 4	MEG	1–0	Students Union FC	Bangalore
	Lethaolen Khjongsai 27'	Report		Stadium: Bangalore Football Stadium

13 January 2021 5	Bangalore Independents	3–1	ADE	Bangalore
	Tijo Job 45'; Vinod 49'; Manivannan 55' (pen.)	Report	Clinton 9'	Stadium: Bangalore Football Stadium

13 January 2021 6	Bangalore Eagles	2–0	Bangalore Dream United	Bangalore
	Gopi 35', 41'	Report		Stadium: Bangalore Football Stadium

15 January 2021 7	Young Challengers	0–3	Bengaluru FC B	Bangalore
		Report	Lalthangliana 13'; Sivasakthi 32 '; Ratanbi Singh 84'	Stadium: Bangalore Football Stadium

15 January 2021 8	FC Deccan	1–1	Kickstart FC	Bangalore
	Sujesh 10'	Report	Sudheer Kotikela 45+4'	Stadium: Bangalore Football Stadium

18 January 2021 9	Income Tax	0–8	ASC	Bangalore
		Report	Gautam S 17', 30', 54'; Deepak S 45', 84'	Stadium: Bangalore Football Stadium

18 January 2021 10	FC Deccan	1–1	Kickstart FC	Bangalore
	Sujesh 10'	Report	Sudheer Kotikela 45+4'; D Majumdar 80' (82), 89'	Stadium: Bangalore Football Stadium

18 January 2021 11	Students United	0–1	FC Bengaluru United	Bangalore
		Report	Oliverira 55'	Stadium: Bangalore Football Stadium

19 January 2021 12	MEG	0–3	ADE	Bangalore
		Report	Rahul 18'; Ajay Alex Antony 55'; Lethalo 82'	Stadium: Bangalore Football Stadium

20 January 2021 13	Bengaluru FC B	4–2	FC Deccan	Bangalore
	Kamalesh ?'; Akashdeep Singh ?'; Thoi Singh ?'; Omega Vanlalruaituanga ?'	Report	Kaviarasan ?'; Sajeesh ?'	Stadium: Bangalore Football Stadium

21 January 2021 14	Kickstart FC	10–0	Income Tax FC	Bangalore
	Nikhil Raj 1', 61'; Tharun M 11', oh'; Sudheer Kotekela 25' *Satish Kumar 35'; Luckey Kelechukukwa 4', 59', 83'; Harpreet Singh 50'; Vignesh 88'	Report		Stadium: Bangalore Football Stadium

21 January 2021 15	ASC	2–2	Students Union	Bangalore
	Thiyagarajan 33'; Shafeel PP 90+4'	Report		Stadium: Bangalore Football Stadium

22 January 2021 16	FC Bengaluru United	4–0	ADE	Bangalore
	Jaison Jordon Vaz 9'; Chaitain K 30'; Meitei KM 72'; Ronaldo Oliveira 79'	Report		Stadium: Bangalore Football Stadium

25 January 2021 17	FC Deccan	6–2	Young Challengers	Bangalore
	Sajeesh 10', 70'; Surya 26'; Kaviarasan 47'; Satlin 82'; Antony 90+1'	Report	D Prakash 50'; Anthony 50'	Stadium: Bangalore Football Stadium

25 January 2021 18	Students Union	1–0	Kickstart FC	Bangalore
	Lokesh 28'	Report		Stadium: Bangalore Football Stadium

27 January 2021 19	Income Tax FC	1–8	Bengaluru FC B	Bangalore
	Anthony Leonard 33'	Report	Sivasakthi 3', 15', 29', 32', 50'; Ratanbi Singh ?'; Bekey Oram ?'; Shashidharan ?' (O.G.)	Stadium: Bangalore Football Stadium

27 January 2021 20	ADE	0–1	ASC	Bangalore
		Report	Dip Majumder 40'	Stadium: Bangalore Football Stadium

28 January 2021 21	Bangalore Dream United	0–6	FC Bengaluru United	Bangalore
		Report	Ronaldo Oliveira 15'; Chaitan K 26', 41', 65'; M Meitei 33'; Standly Fernandes 35'	Stadium: Bangalore Football Stadium

28 January 2021 22	Bangalore Eagles FC	2–3	MEG	Bangalore
	Shashikumar 43'; Shivakumar 45'	Report	Deepak Kumar 61' (O.G.); L Khong 79'; Akbar 80'	Stadium: Bangalore Football Stadium

=== February ===
1 February 2021 24	Kickstart FC	7–0	ADE FC	Bangalore
	Nikhil Raj 3', 61', 74'; Vignesh 31'; Uzochi Emmanel 45', 54'; Karthik 71'	Report		Stadium: Bangalore Football Stadium

1 February 2021 25	ASC	0–1	Bangalore Dream United	Bangalore
		Report	Dorjee 11'	Stadium: Bangalore Football Stadium

2 February 2021 26	FC Bengaluru United	1–1	Bangalore Eagles FC	Bangalore
	Meitei 31'	Report	K Gopi 64'	Stadium: Bangalore Football Stadium

2 February 2021 27	Bengaluru FC B	5–2	Students Union	Bangalore
	Akashdeep Singh 10' (pen.); Sivasakthi 44'	Report	Taiki Yoshida 6'; Akshay K 89'	Stadium: Bangalore Football Stadium

3 February 2021 28	MEG	2–1	Bangalore Independents	Bangalore
	Ajay Anthony 65'; Letholen 82'	Report	Sathish 83'	Stadium: Bangalore Football Stadium

3 February 2021 29	Young Challengers	5–1	Income Tax FC	Bangalore
	Nihal Colaco 24' (71); Murali Joseph 60', 72'; Abhishek Panchamiya 63' (pen.)	Report	Austin 87' (pen.)	Stadium: Bangalore Football Stadium

4 February 2021 30	ADE	0–3	Bengaluru FC B	Bangalore
		Report	Damaitphang Lyngdoh 52'; Huidrom Thoi Singh 56'; Jagadeep Singh 64'	Stadium: Bangalore Football Stadium

5 February 2021 31	Bengaluru Eagles	1–1	ASC	Bangalore
	Deepak Pant 59' (o.g.)	Report	Shafeel PP 53'	Stadium: Bangalore Football Stadium

8 February 2021 32	Students Union	3–2	Young Challengers	Bangalore
	Vignesh Srinivas 44'; Murali Srinivas 72' (pen.)	Report		Stadium: Bangalore Football Stadium

8 February 2021 33	Income Tax	0–11	FC Deccan	Bangalore
		Report	Shervin D 4'; Surya UK 14'; Ashik AS 16', 29', 50'; Sajeesh E 25', 45'; Akhil P 43'; Syed Ahmed 64', 85'; Stalin Daniel 84'	Stadium: Bangalore Football Stadium

9 February 2021 34	Bengaluru Independents	0–1	Bengaluru United	Bangalore
		Report	M. Meitei 55'	Stadium: Bangalore Football Stadium

9 February 2021 35	Bengaluru FC B	4–0	Dream United	Bangalore
	Robin Yadav 11'; Sivasakthi 51'; Akashdeep Singh 81'; M. Molla 88'	Report		Stadium: Bangalore Football Stadium

10 February 2021 36	Kickstart FC	5–0	Bangalore Eagles	Bangalore
	Sudhir Kotikela 55'; Uzochi Emmanel Echebiri 56'; Nikhil Raj 73', 90+3' (90+5)	Report		Stadium: Bangalore Football Stadium

11 February 2021 37	FC Deccan	0–0	Students Union	Bangalore
		Report		Stadium: Bangalore Football Stadium

11 February 2021 38	Young Challengers	3–0	ADE	Bangalore
	Nikhil Colaco 42'; Ankith 50', 62'	Report		Stadium: Bangalore Football Stadium

12 February 2021 39	ASC	3–0	Bangalore Independents	Bangalore
	Shafeel 23' (pen.); T. Krishnakanta 63'; Dip Majumder 90+3'	Report		Stadium: Bangalore Football Stadium

12 February 2021 40	Bengaluru United	4–0	MEG	Bangalore
	N. Meitei 33'; Oliveira 38'; V. Gunashekhar 74'; Chaitan Komar 83'	Report		Stadium: Bangalore Football Stadium

15 February 2021 41	Bangalore Eagles	1–0	Bengaluru FC B	Bangalore
	Dominic Jacob Paul 86'	Report		Stadium: Bangalore Football Stadium

15 February 2021 42	Bangalore Independents	2–0	Kickstart FC	Bangalore
	Sudhir Kotikela 86'; Solaimalai 69' (pen.)	Report		Stadium: Bangalore Football Stadium

16 February 2021 43	MEG	1–1	ASC	Bangalore
	Lalthaolen Khongsai 6'	Report	Dip Majumder 42'	Stadium: Bangalore Football Stadium

16 February 2021 44	Students Union	2–0	Income Tax	Bangalore
	Murali Srinivas 70' *Ramu Srikanth 79'	Report		Stadium: Bangalore Football Stadium

17 February 2021 45	Dream United	0–2	Young Challengers	Bangalore
		Report	Ankith P 58', 73'	Stadium: Bangalore Football Stadium

17 February 2021 46	ADE	1–1	FC Deccan	Bangalore
	Santosh V 78'	Report	Syed Ahmed 21'	Stadium: Bangalore Football Stadium

18 February 2021 47	Bangalore Independents	Match Abandoned	Bangalore Eagles	Bangalore
		Report		Stadium: Bangalore Football Stadium

22 February 2021 48	Kickstart FC	0–1	MEG	Bangalore
		Report	Shubham Rana 90+3'	Stadium: Bangalore Football Stadium

22 February 2021 49	Bengaluru FC B	3–0	Bangalore Independents	Bangalore
	Sivasakthi 6', 9', 32'	Report		Stadium: Bangalore Football Stadium

23 February 2021 50	ASC	1–2	Bengaluru United	Bangalore
	Thiyagarajan 11'	Report	Chaitan Komar 75'; Asrar Rehbar 90+4'	Stadium: Bangalore Football Stadium

24 February 2021 51	FC Deccan	3–0	Dream United	Bangalore
	Sunil Joshua 11'; Sherwin 38'; Surya 53'	Report		Stadium: Bangalore Football Stadium

24 February 2021 52	Income Tax	0–2	ADE	Bangalore
		Report	Rayesab Benakatti 1', 69'	Stadium: Bangalore Football Stadium

26 February 2021 52	ASC	0–3	Bengaluru FC B	Bangalore
	Thoi Singh 56'; Sivasakthi 65', 80'	Report		Stadium: Bangalore Football Stadium

26 February 2021 53	Bengaluru United	6–0	Young Challengers	Bangalore
	Naro Hari Shrestha 12', 86'; Ronaldo Oliveira 26'; Kiran Saravanan 56'; Anup Theres Raj 59'; Roland Singh 62'	Report		Stadium: Bangalore Football Stadium

=== March ===
1 March 2021 54	MEG	4–2	FC Deccan	Bangalore
	Rahul R 6', 47'; Akbar S 14'; Ahmed A 41'	Report	Akhil P 38' (pen.); Sajaeesh E 72'	Stadium: Bangalore Football Stadium

1 March 2021 55	Bangalore Independents	4–1	Income Tax	Bangalore
	Surendra P 36'; Manivanan 65'; Narendra 85'; Ignatius J 90+2'	Report	Amal D 20'	Stadium: Bangalore Football Stadium

2 March 2021 56	Bangalore Eagles	1–0	Students Union	Bangalore
	Appu 21'	Report		Stadium: Bangalore Football Stadium

2 March 2021 57	Dream United	0–0	ADE	Bangalore
		Report		Stadium: Bangalore Football Stadium

3 March 2021 58	Bengaluru United	1–2	Kickstart FC	Bangalore
	Satish Kumar 1' (o.g.)	Report	Sudhir Kotikela 20'; Johnson 40'	Stadium: Bangalore Football Stadium

4 March 2021 59	Bangalore Independents	3–2	Young Challengers	Bangalore
	Narendra Prasad 3'; Surendra Prasad 25'; Ignatius John 41'; Ankith 72'	Report	Kishudharan M 86'	Stadium: Bangalore Football Stadium

4 March 2021 59	MEG	0–1	Bengaluru FC B	Bangalore
		Report	Sivasakthi 90+3'	Stadium: Bangalore Football Stadium

5 March 2021 60	ADE	0–3	Students Union	Bangalore
		Report	Pawan Kumar 5'; Sunil 79' (o.g.); Murali Srinivas 89'	Stadium: Bangalore Football Stadium

5 March 2021 61	Bangalore Eagles	2–0	FC Deccan	Bangalore
	Ananthu Murali 54'; Pratik Swami 88 '	Report		Stadium: Bangalore Football Stadium

7 March 2021 62	Bangalore Independents	0–0	Bangalore Eagles	Bangalore
		Report		Stadium: Bangalore Football Stadium

8 March 2021 63	Dream United	2–1	Income Tax	Bangalore
	Dorjee 52'; Jacob John 54'	Report	Amal 17' (pen.)	Stadium: Bangalore Football Stadium

8 March 2021 64	Bengaluru FC B	2–3	Bengaluru United	Bangalore
	Sivasakthi 58'; D Lyngdoh 90+3'	Report	Daniel Carr 17'; Robert Primus 75'; Ronaldo Oliveira 90+5'	Stadium: Bangalore Football Stadium

11 March 2021 65	FC Deccan	0–1	Bengaluru United	Bangalore
	Robert Primus 4'	Report		Stadium: Bangalore Football Stadium

11 March 2021 66	Students Union	2–1	Dream United	Bangalore
	Vignesh Srinivas 4'; Taki Yoshida 25'	Report	Dorjee 29'	Stadium: Bangalore Football Stadium

12 March 2021 67	Kickstart FC	2–0	ASC	Bangalore
	Sudhir Kotikela 55'; Magnesh Selva 87'	Report		Stadium: Bangalore Football Stadium

12 March 2021 68	Young Challengrts	3–3	MEG	Bangalore
	Nihal Colaco 24', 32'; Ankith 62'	Report	Reagan Singh 16'; Rahul Ramakrishna 48'; Imaanakuna 61'	Stadium: Bangalore Football Stadium

13 March 2021 69	Income Tax	0–5	Bangalore Eagles	Bangalore
		Report	Niyas Nankuth 11 '; Cletus Dominic John 26', 57', 69'; Seenu S 85'	Stadium: Bangalore Football Stadium

14 March 2021 70	Students Union	3–2	Bangalore Independents	Bangalore
	Vignesh 25'; Sunil Kumar 51'; Taki Yoshida 80'	Report	Narendra 22'; Sridhar 42'	Stadium: Bangalore Football Stadium

15 March 2021 71	Income Tax	2–7	MEG	Bangalore
	Austin 21'; Rayan 24'	Report	Nitin 9', 65'; Asif Khan 61', 68', 86'; Akbar Siddiqui 71'; Rahul Ramakrishna 85'	Stadium: Bangalore Football Stadium

15 March 2021 72	ADE	0–2	Bangalore Eagles	Bangalore
		Report	Nitin 32', 66'	Stadium: Bangalore Football Stadium

16 March 2021 73	Young Challengers	0–1	ASC	Bangalore
		Report	Laishram Prem 77'	Stadium: Bangalore Football Stadium

16 March 2021 74	Bengaluru FC B	2–1	Kickstart FC	Bangalore
	Emboklang Nongkhlaw 20'; Inayath 90+5'	Report	Satish Kumar 82'	Stadium: Bangalore Football Stadium

== Season statistics ==
=== Top scorers ===
As of 16 March 2021.

Rank	Player	Club	Goals
1	(India) Sivasakthi Narayanan	Bengaluru FC B	15
2	(India) Ankith P	Young Challengers	10
3	(India) Magesh Selva	Kickstart FC	9
3	(India) Sudheer Kotikela	Kickstart FC	9
4	(India) Ronaldo Oliveira	Bengaluru United	8
4	(India) Dip Majumder	ASC	8
5	(India) Chaitan Komar Pant	Bengaluru United	7
5	(India) Akashdeep Singh	Bengaluru FC B	7
6	(India) Nihal Colaco	Young Challengers	6
5	(India) Meitei KM	Bengaluru United	5
5	(India) Letholen Khongsai	MEG	5
5	(India) Rahul Ramakrishna	MEG	5
5	(India) Akbar Siddique	MEG	5
5	(India) Dominic Jacob Paul	Bangalore Eagles	5

== Awards ==
=== BDFA Super Division Outstanding players of the week award ===
Week 1
Player	Position	Club
Dilip Velu	Goalkeeper	Young Challengers FC
Vivekananda Sagayraj	Defender	Kickstart FC
Ajay Alex Antony	Midfielder	MEG FC
Sivasakthi Narayanan	Forward	Bengaluru FC 'B'

=== BDFA Super Division League 2020-21 best player awards ===
Player	Position	Club
Nihal Hussain	Goalkeeper	Bangalore Eagles FC
Shafeel	Defender	ASC
Nikhil Raj	Midfielder	Kickstart FC
Sivasakthi Narayanan	Forward	Bengaluru FC 'B'
