= Aeronautical Development Establishment (football club) =

- Full name: Aeronautical Development Establishment
- Short name: ADE
- Founded: 1982; 43 years ago
- Ground: Bangalore Football Stadium, Bengaluru, Karnataka
- League: BDFA Super Division
- 2020–21: BSD, 12th of 13

Aeronautical Development Establishment, often abbreviated as ADE, was an Indian professional football club based in Bangalore, Karnataka, that last competed in the Bangalore Super Division, a fifth tier league in the Indian football league system. It was sponsored by the Aeronautical Development Establishment.

== History ==
ADE first played professional football in 1982, when it competed in the Bangalore C Division, then the third tier of Bangalore's football league system. They first played in the Super Division in 2000, and won the league for the first time in the 2013–14 season. After a brief hiatus, the team returned for the 2018–19 season.

== Honours ==
- BDFA Super Division
  - Champions (1): 2013–14
  - Third place (1): 2011–12
