= 2013–14 BDFA Super Division =

BDFA Super Division
- Season: 2013–14
- Champions: ADE (1st title)
- Relegated: Jawahar Union

The 2013–14 BDFA Super Division was the eleventh season of the BDFA Super Division which is the third tier of the Indian football system and the top tier of the Karnataka football system. ADE won the title by managing a draw against CIL on 9 June 2014. Jawahar Union were relegated to Bangalore A Division for 2014–15 season.

== Teams ==
Club
ADE
ASC
Bengaluru FC
CIL
HAL
Jawahar Union
MEG
RWF
South United

== Table ==
Pos	Team	Pld	W	D	L	GF	GA	GD	Pts	Qualification or relegation
1	ADE (C)	8	5	2	1	12	6	+6	17	Champions
2	South United	8	4	2	2	12	8	+4	14	
3	CIL	8	4	2	2	13	11	+2	14	
4	MEG	8	2	4	2	11	7	+4	10	
5	ASC	8	2	4	2	12	9	+3	10	
6	RWF	8	2	3	3	12	15	−3	9	
7	Bengaluru FC	8	2	3	3	10	13	−3	9	
8	HAL	8	2	2	4	5	6	−1	8	
9	Jawahar Union (R)	8	1	2	5	6	18	−12	5	Relegated to A Division

Updated to match(es) played on 10 June 2014. Source: Dream United
Rules for classification: 1) points; 2) goal difference; 3) number of goals scored.
(C) Champions; (R) Relegated

== Fixtures and results ==
5 May 2014	Bengaluru FC	1–1	South United	Bangalore Football Stadium, Bangalore
16:00 IST	Sawhney 43'	Report	Sunil 88'

6 May 2014	CIL	1–1	RWF	Bangalore Football Stadium, Bangalore
16:00 IST	Nirmal 15'	Report	Rajesh 32'

7 May 2014	ASC	1–1	Jawahar Union	Bangalore Football Stadium, Bangalore
16:00 IST	Rajeeb Dey 59'	Report	Desai 11'

8 May 2014	Bengaluru FC	0–1	ADE	Bangalore Football Stadium, Bangalore
16:00 IST		Report	Rajkiran 45'

9 May 2014	HAL	0–1	RWF	Bangalore Football Stadium, Bangalore
16:00 IST		Report	Rajesh 45+2'

11 May 2014	Bengaluru FC	2–1	MEG	Bangalore Football Stadium, Bangalore
16:00 IST	Sawhney 4', 23'	Report	Dipen Thapa 52'

12 May 2014	CIL	3–1	Jawahar Union	Bangalore Football Stadium, Bangalore
16:00 IST	Nirmal Kumar 39', 85' (pen.); Chand 90+2'	Report	Desai 28'

13 May 2014	South United	0–1	ADE	Bangalore Football Stadium, Bangalore
16:00 IST		Report	Vijay Karthik 55'

14 May 2014	HAL	1–1	ASC	Bangalore Football Stadium, Bangalore
16:00 IST	Xavier Vijay Kumar 61'	Report	Saikh 46'

15 May 2014	Bengaluru FC	1–1	RWF	Bangalore Football Stadium, Bangalore
16:00 IST	Anto Rushi 15'	Report Archived 2014-05-18 at the Wayback Machine(subscription required)	Rajesh 70'

16 May 2014	MEG	0–2	CIL	Bangalore Football Stadium, Bangalore
16:00 IST			Nirmal Kumar 79'; Pradeep Kumar 83'

17 May 2014	ADE	3–0	Jawahar Union	Bangalore Football Stadium, Bangalore
16:00 IST	Madan 59'; Rajkiran 80'; Deepak 90+2'	Report

18 May 2014	Bengaluru FC	2–1	ASC	Bangalore Football Stadium, Bangalore
16:00 IST	Santosh 6'; Vishal Kumar 88'	Report	Ramachandran 45+2'

19 May 2014	HAL	2–1	South United	Bangalore Football Stadium, Bangalore
16:00 IST	Gopi 14'; Karthigeyan 68'	Report	Senthil 88'

20 May 2014	MEG	5–1	RWF	Bangalore Football Stadium, Bangalore
16:00 IST	Girish 13', 41'; Dipan Thapa 15', 28'; Hamar 54'	Report Archived 2014-05-21 at the Wayback Machine(subscription required)	Satish Kumar 37' (pen.)

21 May 2014	Bengaluru FC	3–5	CIL	Bangalore Football Stadium, Bangalore
16:00 IST	Sawhney 34'; Vijay 60' (o.g.); Rushi Anto 61'	Report	Pradeep Kumar 53', 90'; Prakash B 76'; Nagaraj 83'; Nirmal Kumar 88'

22 May 2014	South United	2–1	Jawahar Union	Bangalore Football Stadium, Bangalore
16:00 IST	Sunil 18'; RajaPandi 76'	Report	Desai 89'

23 May 2014	MEG	0–0	ADE	Bangalore Football Stadium, Bangalore
16:00 IST

24 May 2014	CIL	0–2	ASC	Bangalore Football Stadium, Bangalore
16:00 IST		Report Archived 2014-06-02 at the Wayback Machine(subscription required)	Majumdar 21'; Lakpa Tamang 24'

25 May 2014	Bengaluru FC	0–2	HAL	Bangalore Football Stadium, Bangalore
16:00 IST		Report	AD Kumar 57'; Mahendra Mani 75'

26 May 2014	RWF	5–1	Jawahar Union	Bangalore Football Stadium, Bangalore
16:00 IST	Ajzar Jamal 36'; Prakash 38'; Mani 50'; Satish 79'; Rajesh 88'		Desai 47'

27 May 2014	South United	2–1	ASC	Bangalore Football Stadium, Bangalore
16:00 IST	Subash 28'; Murugappan 46'	Report	Deepak Panth 90+1'

28 May 2014	Bengaluru FC	1–1	Jawahar Union	Bangalore Football Stadium, Bangalore
16:00 IST	Suhas S 89'	Report	Dhruv 82'

29 May 2014	HAL	0–1	ADE	Bangalore Football Stadium, Bangalore
16:00 IST		Report	Kavi Arasan 83'

30 May 2014	ASC	1–1	MEG	Bangalore Football Stadium, Bangalore
16:00 IST	Amit Roy 90+1'	Report	Nguerninal Hamal 35'

31 May 2014	South United	3–0	CIL	Bangalore Football Stadium, Bangalore
16:00 IST	Senthil 53'; Subash 72', 75'	Report

1 June 2014	HAL	0–0	MEG	Bangalore Football Stadium, Bangalore
16:00 IST		Report

2 June 2014	RWF	1–4	ADE	Bangalore Football Stadium, Bangalore
16:00 IST	Prakash 67'	Report	Deepak 24', 86'; Jaivandan 26' (pen.); Dany Chiru 90+1'

3 June 2014	Jawahar Union	1–0	HAL	Bangalore Football Stadium, Bangalore
16:00 IST	Chintan 4'	Report

4 June 2014	ADE	1–4	ASC	Bangalore Football Stadium, Bangalore
16:00 IST	Kavi Arasan 9'	Report	P Majumdar 29'; Aroj Saikh 41'; Lakpa Tamang 47'; Rajib 78'

5 June 2014	South United	2–1	RWF	Bangalore Football Stadium, Bangalore
16:00 IST	Manivanan 31'; Tony 64'	Report	Rajesh 68'

6 June 2014	HAL	0–1	CIL	Bangalore Football Stadium, Bangalore
16:00 IST			Nikhil Das 70'

7 June 2014	MEG	3–0	Jawahar Union	Bangalore Football Stadium, Bangalore
16:00 IST	V.K. Girish 66', 70'; Gabriel 89'	Report Archived 2025-01-25 at the Wayback Machine(subscription required)

8 June 2014	RWF	1–1	ASC	Bangalore Football Stadium, Bangalore
16:00 IST	Rajesh 58'	Report Archived 2025-01-24 at the Wayback Machine(subscription required)	Ramchandran 55'

9 June 2014	ADE	1–1	CIL	Bangalore Football Stadium, Bangalore
16:00 IST	Raju 49'	Report	Pradeep 68'

10 June 2014	MEG	1–1	South United	Bangalore Football Stadium, Bangalore
16:00 IST	Ramu 79'	Report Archived 2024-11-27 at the Wayback Machine(subscription required)	Sharath 9'
