= Kickstart FC =

Indian association football club based in Karnataka

Kickstart
- Full name: Kickstart Football Club Karnataka
- Short name: KFC
- Founded: 9 July 2016; 10 years ago
- Ground: Kickstart Football Arena
- Capacity: 800
- Owner: Shekar Rajan; Laxman Bhattarai
- Head coach: Raghu Kumar
- League: I-League 3 Karnataka Super Division
- Website: www.kickstartfc.com
| Home colours | Away colours |

Active departments of Kickstart FC
- Football (men's): Football (women's)

Kickstart Football Club is an Indian professional football club from Karnataka. Their women's team participate in Indian Women's League and the men's side competes in the Karnataka Super Division. The club was nominated for I-League 2 in 2019 and 2021 but didn't make it to the final list approved by the AIFF.

== History ==
Kickstart FC was founded on 9 July 2016 by Shekar Rajan and Laxman Bhattarai to develop grassroot level football in Karnataka. In 2019–20 Santosh Trophy, 10 players from Kickstart FC played for senior state team of Karnataka, the most of any football club in India. In 2020–21 and 2021–22 season, Kickstart were the runners up of BDFA Super Division and were nominated for 2nd Division I-League. In 2023, the club participated in Stafford Challenge Cup.

Later in 2023, the club secured participation in the newly formed I-League 3.

== Men's team ==
=== Technical staff ===
| Title | Name |
|---|---|
| Chairman | Shekar Rajan |
| CEO | Laxman Bhattarai |
| Head coach | Raghu Kumar |
| Assistant coach | A. Tirunaukkarasu |
| Goalkeeping coach | Keisham Narayan |
| General manager | Saravana D |

=== Current squad ===
Note: Flags indicate national team as defined under FIFA eligibility rules; some limited exceptions apply. Players may hold more than one non-FIFA nationality.

| No. | Pos. | Nation | Player |
|---|---|---|---|
| 1 | GK | IND | Kabir Toufik |
| 2 | DF | IND | Aibiang Mame Nongneng |
| 3 | DF | IND | Harikrishnan M |
| 9 | FW | IND | Alocious Muthayyan |
| 10 | FW | IND | Abhishekh Shankar Powar |
| 12 | DF | IND | Johnson A |
| 15 | MF | IND | Sheltohn Paul |
| 17 | MF | IND | Vijay Nagappan |
| 18 | FW | IND | Pangambam Naoba Meitei |
| 25 | DF | IND | Michael Regin |

| No. | Pos. | Nation | Player |
|---|---|---|---|
| 27 | MF | IND | Khanngam Horam |
| 30 | FW | IND | Alister Anthony |
| 6 | DF | IND | Evan Thapa |
| — | MF | IND | Solaimalai |
| — | DF | IND | Ganesan |
| — | FW | IND | Shelton Nickson |
| — | MF | IND | Ajay A |
| — | DF | IND | Arvind Babu |
| — | FW | IND | Lijo K |
| — | GK | IND | Manikandan M |

=== Kit manufacturers and shirt sponsors ===
| Period | Kit manufacturer | Shirt sponsor |
|---|---|---|
| 2016–2020 | — | — |
| 2021–2022 | SIX5SIX | |
| 2024-Present | SWEAT | |

== Honours ==
=== Domestic league ===
- BDFA Super Division
  - Champions (1) (KSFA Super Division): 2025–26
  - Runners-up (2): 2019–20, 2020–21,2024–25

=== Cup ===
- Puttaiah Memorial Cup
  - Winners (1): 2022
- All-India Football Tournament Kolhapur
  - Runners-up (1): 2022

== Affiliated clubs ==
- (Netherlands) VV SBC (2021–present)
- (England) Tottenham Hotspur (2023–present)
