= Jan Muzangu =

Swiss footballer (born 2000)

Personal information
- Date of birth: 31 May 2000 (age 26)
- Place of birth: Basel, Switzerland
- Height: 1.73 m (5 ft 8 in)
- Position: Midfielder

Team information
- Current team: BSC Old Boys

Youth career
- Black Stars Basel
- Basel
- Concordia Basel

Senior career*
| Years | Team | Apps | (Gls) |
| 2018–2021 | Basel U21 | 13 | (0) |
| 2020 | → Chennai City (loan) | 6 | (1) |
| 2021–2022 | Black Stars Basel | 30 | (5) |
| 2022–2023 | Rapperswil-Jona | | |
- * Club domestic league appearances and goals

Jan Muzangu (born 31 May 2000) is a Swiss footballer who plays as a midfielder.

== Club career ==
=== Chennai City ===
Muzangu penned a deal for loan transfer for I-League side Chennai City F.C. and made his first appearance against East Bengal F.C. whereby they suffered a loss of 0–2. On February 9, 2020 he scored his first goal for Chennai City against Churchill Brothers S.C. and won the contest by 2–1.

=== Black Stars Basel ===
In 2021, Muzangu signed with Swiss Promotion League side Black Stars Basel.
