= 2011–12 BDFA Super Division =

BDFA Super Division
- Season: 2011–12
- Champions: KGF Academy (1st title)
- Relegated: BEL; CIL

The 2011–12 BDFA Super Division was the ninth season of the BDFA Super Division which is the third tier of the Indian football system and the top tier of the Karnataka football system.

At the end of the season it was KGF Academy who finished as the champions, while BEL and CIL were relegated to A Division.

== Teams ==
Club
ADE
ASC
BEL
CIL
HAL
KGF Academy
KSP
MEG
Postal Department
Students Union

== Table ==
Pos	Team	Pld	W	D	L	GF	GA	GD	Pts	Qualification or relegation
1	KGF Academy (C)	9	7	1	1	26	9	+17	22	Champions
2	HAL	9	6	2	1	17	9	+8	20	
3	ADE	9	5	2	2	14	6	+8	17	
4	MEG	9	4	3	2	12	6	+6	15	
5	KSP	9	4	2	3	9	9	0	14	
6	ASC	9	3	3	3	14	9	+5	12	
7	Postal Department	9	3	2	4	12	10	+2	11	
8	Students Union	9	3	0	6	13	22	−9	9	
9	CIL (R)	9	2	1	6	5	15	−10	7	Relegated to A Division
10	BEL (R)	9	0	0	9	3	30	−27	0	Relegated to A Division

Updated to match(es) played on 19 July 2012. Source: Dream United
Rules for classification: 1) points; 2) goal difference; 3) number of goals scored.
(C) Champions; (R) Relegated
