= 2024–25 BDFA Super Division =

BDFA Super Division
- Season: 2024–25
- Dates: 7 October 2024 — 20 February 2025
- Champions: FC Agniputhra
- Promoted: FC Agniputhra
- Relegated: Bangalore United FC (BUFC); Real Chikkamagaluru

The 2024–25 BDFA Super Division was the 22nd season of the BDFA Super Division, the fifth-tier league in the Indian football system, and Karnataka's top-tier football league. Bengaluru FC 'B' were the current defending champions, having won the 2023-24 BDFA Super Division without losing a game. Eighteen teams competed in the league in the 2024-25 season, one less than the previous season.

== Changes from previous season ==
=== Relegated to A Division ===
- FC Deccan
- Bangalore Dream United
- Young Challengers

=== Promoted from A Division ===
- Parikrma FC

=== Direct entrants ===
- Real Bengaluru FC

== Teams ==
- ASC & C FC
- FC Agniputhra
- Bangalore Independents
- Bengaluru B
- Bangalore United FC (BUFC)
- Real Chikkamagaluru
- FC Bengaluru United
- FC Real Bengaluru
- HAL SC
- Kickstart
- Kodagu FC
- MEG & C FC
- Parikrma FC
- Rebels FC
- Roots FC
- SC Bengaluru
- South United
- Students Union

== Regular season ==
=== League table ===
Pos	Team	Pld	W	D	L	GF	GA	GD	Pts	Qualification or relegation
1	FC Agniputhra (C, P)	17	14	0	3	38	19	+19	42	Champions and qualification for 2025–26 I-League 3
2	Kickstart	17	12	4	1	52	12	+40	40	
3	FC Bengaluru United	17	11	5	1	45	13	+32	38	
4	Kodagu FC	17	11	2	4	40	14	+26	35	
5	Bengaluru B	17	10	4	3	48	18	+30	34	
6	South United	17	9	3	5	31	19	+12	30	
7	MEG & C FC	17	8	2	7	22	27	−5	26	
8	HAL SC	17	8	2	7	16	21	−5	26	
9	SC Bengaluru	17	7	4	6	26	17	+9	25	
10	Students Union	17	6	4	7	22	26	−4	22	
11	FC Real Bengaluru	17	4	6	7	19	24	−5	18	
12	Roots FC	17	4	5	8	20	24	−4	17	
13	ASC & C FC	17	4	4	9	18	42	−24	16	
14	Parikrma FC	17	4	2	11	24	37	−13	14	
15	Rebels FC	17	4	2	11	22	36	−14	14	
16	Bangalore Independents	17	3	5	9	17	48	−31	14	Withdrew
17	Bangalore United FC (R)	17	3	2	12	13	38	−25	11	Relegation to 2025-26 BDFA A Division
18	Real Chikkamagaluru (R)	17	1	4	12	11	49	−38	7	Relegation to 2025-26 BDFA A Division

Source: The Away End
Rules for classification: 1) points; 2) goal difference; 3) number of goals scored
(C) Champions; (P) Promoted; (R) Relegated

== See also ==
- Men
  - 2024–25 Indian Super League (Tier I)
  - 2024–25 I-League (Tier II)
  - 2024–25 I-League 2 (Tier III)
  - 2024–25 I-League 3 (Tier IV)
  - 2024–25 Indian State Leagues (Tier V)
  - 2025 Super Cup
  - 2024 Durand Cup
- Women
  - 2024–25 Indian Women's League
  - 2024–25 Indian Women's League 2
