= Alfred Fernandes =

Indian footballer and coach

Personal information
- Full name: Alfred Joaquim Fernandes
- Date of birth: 10 April 1966 (age 60)
- Place of birth: Goa, India

Managerial career
- Years: Team
- 2016: Goa
- 2016–2017: Churchill Brothers
- 2019–2020: South United

Alfred Fernandes (born 10 April 1966) is an Indian football coach and former professional player.

== Coaching career ==
Born in Goa, Fernandes was previously a youth development coach for Churchill Brothers. He was in charge of Churchill Brothers at the under-17 and under-14 levels before eventually being promoted to the under-20s. In 2016, Fernandes coached Goa during the Santosh Trophy. He was then promoted to coach the Churchill Brothers senior team in the Goa Professional League. Fernandes then coached Churchill Brothers in their first I-League game of the 2016–17 season, on 8 January 2017 against Mohun Bagan.

== Managerial statistics ==
As of 1 October 2019

Team	From	To	Record				
Team	From	To	G	W	D	L	Win %
Goa	9 February 2016	11 March 2016	9	7	1	1	77.78
Churchill Brothers	August 2016	September 2019	19	3	4	12	15.79
South United	September 2019	2020					
