= Noel Wilson =

Indian footballer

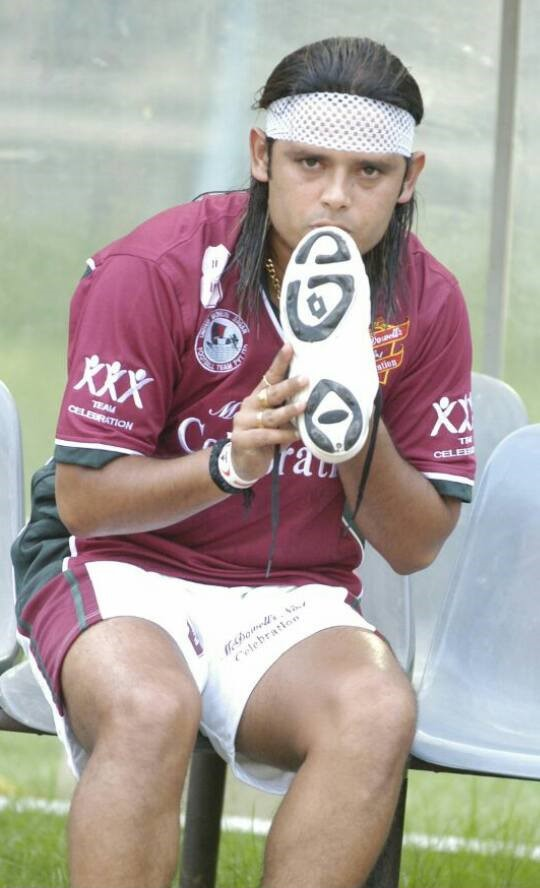
- Wilson with Mohun Bagan in 2005

Personal information
- Full name: Noel Anthony Wilson
- Date of birth: 24 December 1979 (age 46)
- Place of birth: Bangalore, India
- Height: 1.77 m (5 ft 9 1/2 in)
- Position: Midfielder

Team information
- Current team: Chennaiyin (assistant)

Youth career
- 1996–1998: Tata Football Academy

Senior career*
Years	Team	Apps	(Gls)
1998–2000	FC Kochin	44	(4)
2000–2004	Churchill Brothers	110	(24)
2004–2006	Mohun Bagan	48	(4)
2006–2007	Mohamedan Sporting	28	(2)
2007–2011	Mumbai FC	108	(26)

International career
1994-1996	India U23	14	(2)
1998 - 2002	India	20 (Note: Does not include his appearance against Uruguay B on 15 January 2001.)	(4)

Managerial career
- 2018–2020: South United FC
- 2020–2024: Jamshedpur FC Reserves and Academy
- 2024–: Chennaiyin (assistant)
- * Club domestic league appearances and goals

Noel Anthony Wilson (born 24 December 1979) is an Indian football coach and former professional footballer who played as a midfielder for FC Kochin, Churchill Brothers, Mohun Bagan, Mohamedan Sporting and Mumbai FC, in the I-League. He has represented the India national team on numerous occasions and also is a former graduate of Tata Football Academy.He currently the assistant coach of Indian Super League club Chennaiyin FC.

Wilson is former head coach of Jamshedpur FC B and also the Assistant Coach of the Jamshedpur FC senior team.

Wilson represented India B in the Bristol Freedom Cup in 1998. He made four appearances for India in 2001, competing in Millennium Soccer Super Cup matches against Iceland and Uruguay B, and in qualification games for the 2002 FIFA World Cup against Iceland and the United Arab Emirates.

Wilson completed his AFC C License in August 2014. He is a coach at Roots Football Academy, and has been involved in coaching with the Real Madrid Foundation in India.

== Club career ==
=== Tata Football Academy ===
Wilson began attending the Tata Football Academy in 1996, graduating in 1998 as part of the third batch of cadets alongside Mahesh Gawli and Deepak Kumar Mondal.

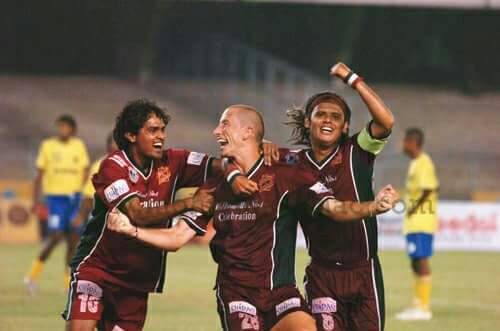
Wilson celebrating a goal with teammates Dipendu Biswas & Du

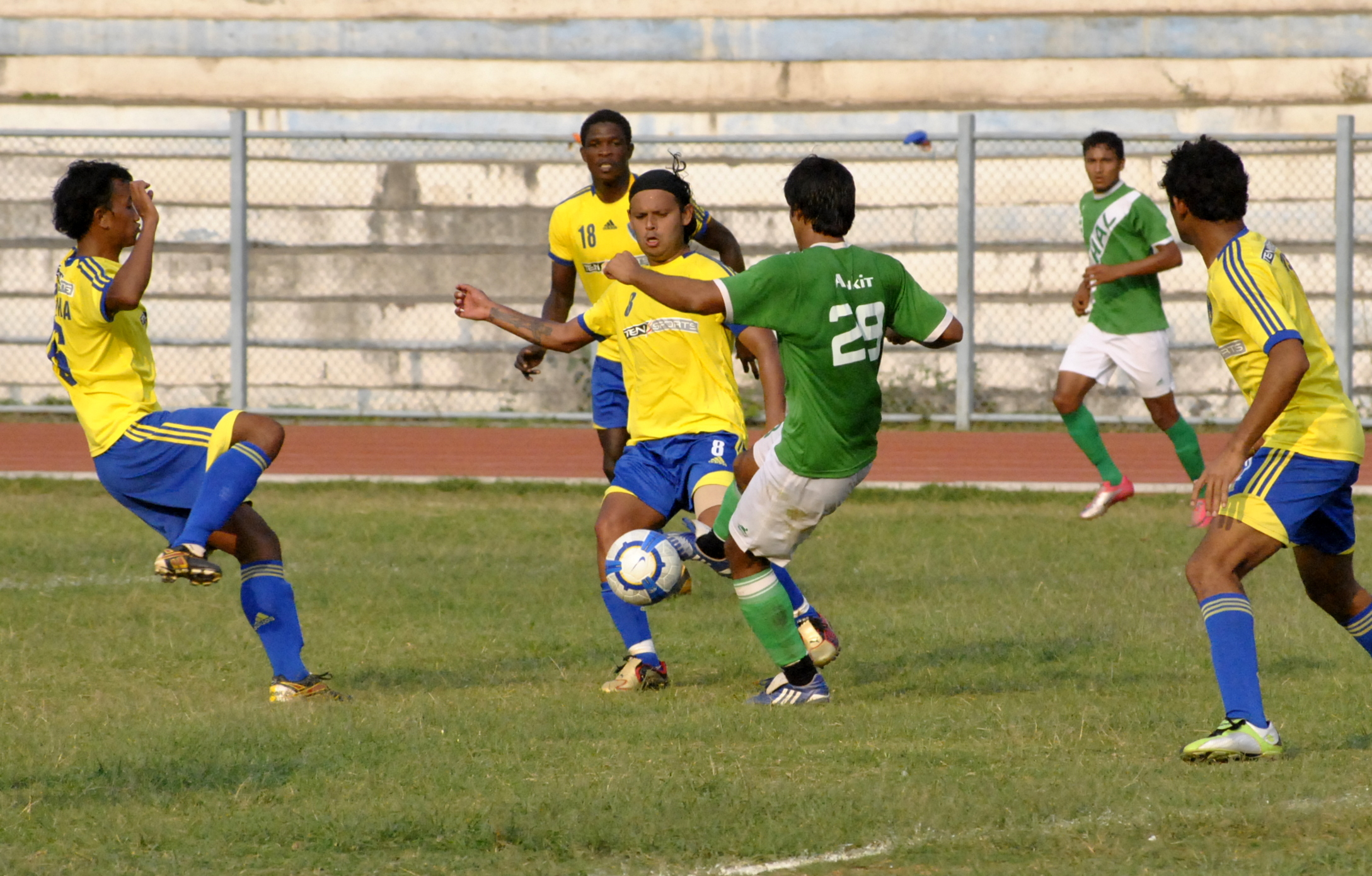
Noel Wilson in action with Mumbai FC against HAL SC in an I-League encounter

== International career ==
Wilson represented the Blue Tigers in the late 1990s and early 2000s. His debut came in the AFC Qualifying tournament in Bangalore in the year 1998. The qualifiers also consisted of Pakistan, Kyrgyzstan, Sri Lanka, and Bhutan. Upon qualifying and reaching the final round which was held in Thailand, India had to fend off strong teams like Qatar, Thailand, Kuwait & Uzbekistan. Wilson was a regular starter in this tournament.

Wilson then went onto representing the senior team in the 50yrs Independence Cup held in Sri Lanka in 1999. India played against Sri Lanka, Maldives, Malaysia. India had then played Sri Lanka in the final of the tournament. Wilson then played the SAFF Games held in Nepal in 1999.

After playing the Pre Olympics between Thailand in 2000, Wilson was a part of the team that played the Millennium Cup in Kochi in 2000. It involved teams such as Uruguay, Iceland and Indonesia.

He also played the World Cup Qualifiers held in Bangalore in 2001 vs UAE, Yemen, and Brunei, playing both the home and away legs.

== Managerial career ==
After retiring from football, Wilson started to work as a mentor and youth coach at SUFC in March 2013.

Currently he is a regular at Roots Football Academy in Bangalore.

After successfully completing AFC C licence and AFC B licenses he is now an AFC A licence holder which only a handful of Indian coaches possess. Wilson was recently appointed as the head coach of South United FC, he took over from the Spanish coach Miki Lladó. His first managerial victory came against Fateh Hyderabad AFC when his side beat the later 1–0. This was also SUFC's first victory in 2018-19 I-League 2nd Division.

Wilson was appointed as Jamshedpur FC B Head Coach in January 2020. The team participated in the I-League 2nd Division and were on a good trajectory before the COVID-19 Pandemic stopped all football activities. Later in the year, Wilson was added to the senior team Technical Staff of Jamshedpur FC as Assistant Coach to Owen Coyle. Wilson also led the Jamshedpur FC B team in the 2021 Durand Cup in September 2021.

== Honours ==
India

- South Asian Games Bronze medal: 1999
