= Ozone FC =

Indian association football club based in Bangalore

Ozone
- Full name: Ozone Football Club Bengaluru
- Nickname: OFCB
- Founded: 2015; 11 years ago
- Ground: Bangalore Football Stadium
- Capacity: 8,400
- Owner: Ozone Group
- League: BDFA Super Division

Ozone Football Club Bengaluru (simply known as Ozone FC) was an Indian professional football club based in Bengaluru, Karnataka. Founded in 2015, the club competed in BDFA Super Division, the top division of football in the state. Ozone reached the final round of the I-League 2nd Division in the 2017–18, 2018–19 seasons respectively and were also the winner's of the BDFA Super Division in 2017–18.

== History ==
Ozone Football Club was launched on 3 November 2015 by the Ozone Group with the goal of making the I-League by 2017. The club were quick to make a mark on the local football scene, winning the BDFA Super Division in December 2015, within their first month of existence.

On 2 August 2016, the club roped former Trinidadian international Cornell Glen as their foreign recruit who represented his country at the 2006 FIFA World Cup. Thus he became the Ozone's first ever world cup player.

On 17 December 2016, it was revealed that the club would participate in the 2016–17 I-League 2nd Division. Ozone were included in Group C along with Pride Sports, Fateh Hyderabad and Kenkre. However, they could not advance beyond group stage.

In the 2017–18 season, after winning the BDFA Super Division under the guidance of David Booth, Ozone FC continued their form in the I-League Second Division, reaching the final stages, eventually falling short of qualifying for the I-League, where they finished on the third position.

== Stadium ==
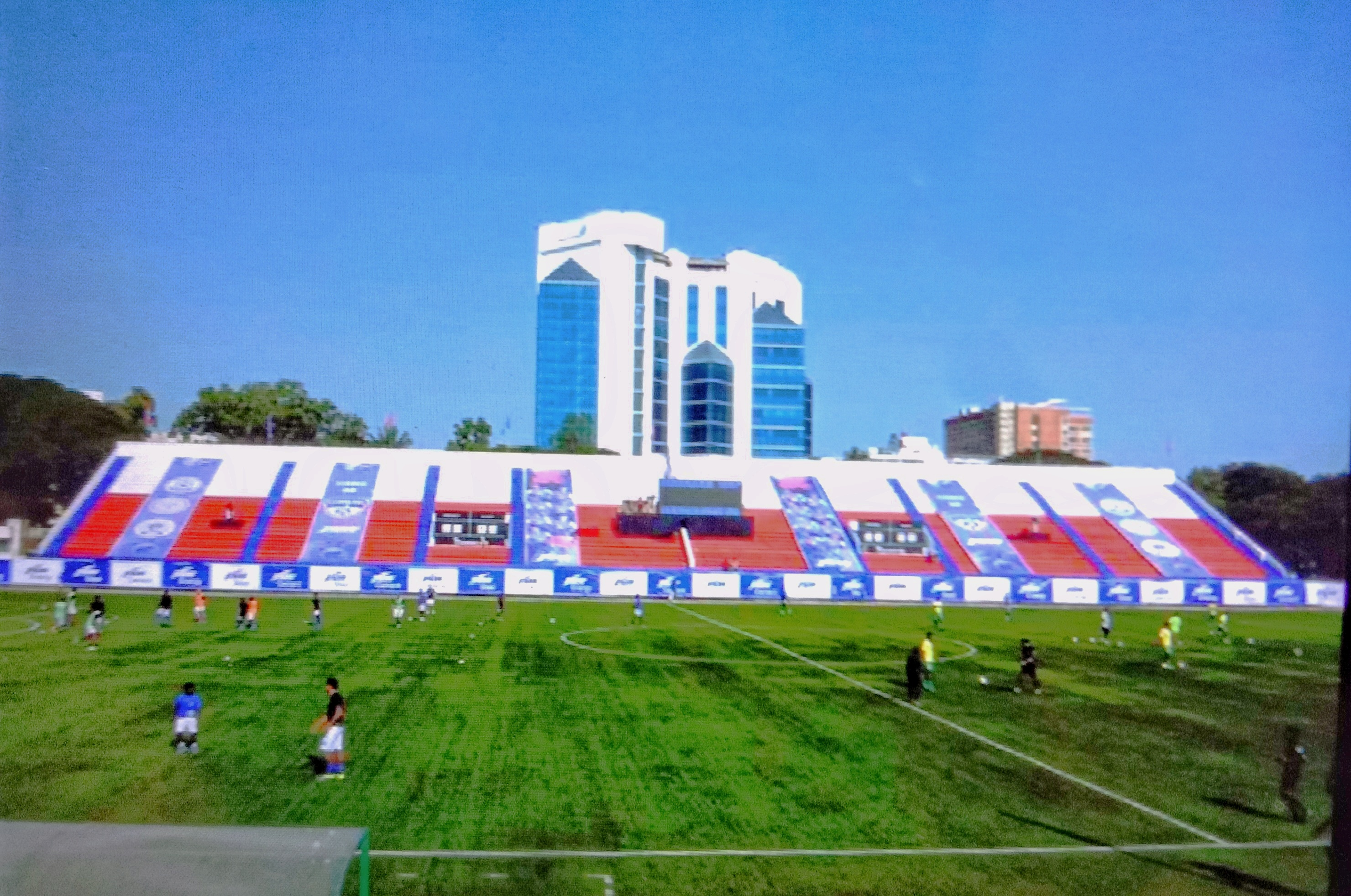
New Bengaluru Football Stadium in Karnataka, used as home ground of Ozone FC.

Ozone FC plays their home matches of BDFA Super Division at the New Bangalore Football Stadium, which has a capacity of 8,400 spectators. They have also used the stadium for their previous I-League 2nd Division matches.

== Players ==
As of 14 January 2019

Note: Flags indicate national team as defined under FIFA eligibility rules; some limited exceptions apply. Players may hold more than one non-FIFA nationality.

No.	Pos.	Nation	Player
1	GK	IND	Dharminder Guru
3	DF	IND	Keith Raymond Stephan
4	DF	IND	John Peter
5	DF	IND	Oinam Sanatomba Singh
7	MF	IND	Rinreithan Shaiza
8	MF	IND	A. Mohammed Moinuddin
15	MF	IND	Anto Rashith
18	MF	IND	Ayush Adhikari
19	FW	IND	Aniket Varekar

No.	Pos.	Nation	Player
20	MF	IND	Umashankar
21	GK	IND	Sheldon Raghwan
22	MF	IND	Prabin Subba
24	DF	IND	D. Mark Anthony
25	FW	IND	Harpreet
28	DF	IND	Gurmeet Singh
29	DF	IND	Manoj Swamy Kannan
30	MF	IND	Gunashekar Vignesh
32	DF	IND	Azharuddeen
40	MF	IND	Sampath Kuttymani
42	MF	IND	Shamanth D Gowda
47	FW	IND	C. S. Sabeeth

== Managerial history ==
- (Netherlands) Bert Zuurman (2016–2017)
- (England) Dave Booth (2017–2019)
- (India) Noel Wilson (2019–2020)

== Season statistics ==
Season	Div.	Tms.	Pos.	Attendance/G	Federation Cup/Super Cup	BDFA Super Division	AFC Champions League	AFC Cup
2016–17	I-League 2nd Division	12	Group stage	2,567	DNP	3	DNP	DNP
2017–18	I-League 2nd Division	18	3	780	DNP	1	DNP	DNP

Key

- Tms. = Number of teams
- Pos. = Position in league
- Attendance/G = Average league attendance

== Team records ==
=== Seasons ===
As of 24 February 2017

Year	League								Federation Cup	Top Scorer(s)	
Year	P	W	D	L	GF	GA	Pts	Pos.	Federation Cup	Player(s)	Goals
2016–17	6	3	2	13	8	10	10	Group stage	DNQ	Anto Xavier	7
2017–18	13	5	6	2	23	8	21	Final Round	DNQ	Robert de Souza Ribeiro	20

== Notable former players ==
For all former notable players of Ozone FC with a Wikipedia article, see: Ozone FC players.

World Cup player

- (Trinidad and Tobago) Cornell Glen (2016–2017)

Foreign international(s)

- (Honduras) Roby Norales (2016–2017)
- (India) Deepak Mondal (2016–2017)

== Honours ==
=== Domestic (league) ===
- I-League 2nd Division
  - Third place (2): 2017–18, 2018–19
- BDFA Super Division
  - Champions (2): 2015–16, 2017–18
  - Runners-up (1): 2018–19

== See also ==
- List of football clubs in India
- BDFA Super Division
