= Bangalore Football League =

- Organising bodies: Bangalore District Football Association (BDFA)
- Country: India
- Divisions: 5 (Karnataka Super Division; KSFA A Division; KSFA B Division; KSFA C Division; KSFA D Division)
- Number of clubs: Various
- Level on pyramid: 5–9
- Promotion to: I-League 3
- Relegation to: Various
- Domestic cup: Stafford Challenge Cup
- League cup: C. Puttaiah shata Memorial Cup
- Current champions: Bengaluru FC B (3rd title)
- Most championships: HAL (8 titles)
- Broadcaster: SportsCast India (YouTube)
- Current: 2026–27 Karnataka Super Division

The Bangalore Football League is organised by the Bangalore District Football Association (BDFA), which is affiliated to the Karnataka State Football Association (KSFA) as a ladder-based state football competition involving a total of four divisions and over 130 teams in the Indian state of Karnataka. Karnataka Super Division is the top-division, started in 2001. The winner is awarded the George Hoover Cup. Prior to 2001, the BDFA A Division was the top tier, which currently act as 2nd tier of the state leagues ladder.

== League structure ==
Bangalore Football League
Tier	Division
I _{(5 on Indian Football Pyramid)}	Karnataka Super Division _{↑promote (to I-League 3) ↓relegate}
II _{(6 on Indian Football Pyramid)}	KSFA A Division _{↑promote ↓relegate}
III _{(7 on Indian Football Pyramid)}	KSFA B Division _{↑promote ↓relegate}
IV _{(8 on Indian Football Pyramid)}	KSFA C Division _{↑promote}

== Karnataka Super Division ==
Karnataka Super Division formerly known as BDFA Super Division is the top state-level football league in the Indian state of Karnataka, started in 2001. The winner is awarded George Hoover Cup. Prior to 2001, the BDFA A Division was the top tier.

Karnataka Super Division
- Organising bodies: Bangalore District Football Association (BDFA)
- Founded: 2001; 25 years ago
- Country: India
- Divisions: 5
- Number of clubs: 20
- Level on pyramid: 5
- Promotion to: I-League 3
- Relegation to: KSFA A Division
- Domestic cup: Puttaiah Memorial Cup (invitational)
- Current champions: Kickstart FC (1st title)
- Most championships: HAL (7 titles)
- Current: 2026–27 Karnataka Super Division

=== Teams ===
Eighteen teams participated in the 2024-25 BDFA Super Division.

- ASC & C FC
- FC Agniputhra
- Bangalore City FC
- Bangalore Independents
- Bangalore Dream United FC
- Bengaluru B
- FC Bengaluru United
- FC Real Bengaluru
- Real Chikkamagaluru
- HAL SC
- Kickstart
- Kodagu FC
- MEG & C FC
- Parikrma FC
- Rebels FC
- Roots FC
- SC Bengaluru
- South United
- Students Union

=== Winners ===
Season	Champion	Runners-up
2001	Hindustan Aeronautics	Karnataka State Police
2002	Hindustan Aeronautics	
2003	Controllerate of Inspection Electronics	
2004	Hindustan Aeronautics	
2005	Hindustan Aeronautics	
2006–07	Madras Engineer Group	
2007	Hindustan Aeronautics	
2008–09	Hindustan Aeronautics	
2011–12	Madras Engineer Group	Hindustan Aeronautics
2012–13	Hindustan Aeronautics Limited	South United
2013–14	Aeronautical Development Establishment	South United
2014–15	Army Service Corps	South United
2015–16	Ozone	South United
2016–17	Madras Engineer Group	Students Union
2017–18	Ozone	Students Union
2018–19	Bengaluru B	Ozone
2019–20	Bengaluru B	Kickstart
2020–21	Bengaluru United	Bengaluru B
2021–22	Bengaluru United	Kickstart
2022–23	SC Bengaluru	Bengaluru United
2023–24	Bengaluru B	SC Bengaluru
2024–25	FC Agniputhra	Kickstart
2025–26	Kickstart	

=== Most successful clubs ===
Club	Titles	Winning years
Hindustan Aeronautics Limited	7	2001, 2002, 2004, 2005, 2007, 2008–09, 2012–13
Bengaluru FC B	3	2018–19, 2019–20, 2023–24
Madras Engineer Group	2	2006–07, 2016–17
Ozone	2	2015–16, 2017–18
Bengaluru United	2	2020–21, 2021–22
Controllerate of Inspection Electronics	1	2003
KGF Academy	1	2011–12
ADE	1	2013–14
Army Service Corps	1	2014–15
Sporting Bengaluru	1	2022–23

== KSFA A Division ==
KSFA A Division
- Organising bodies: Bangalore District Football Association (BDFA)
- Founded: 1994; 32 years ago
- Country: India
- Number of clubs: 10
- Level on pyramid: 7
- Promotion to: Karnataka Super Division
- Relegation to: KSFA B Division
- Current champions: Bangalore Eagles (2023–24)

KSFA A Division formerly known as BDFA A Division is the third tier football league in the Indian state of Karnataka. Prior to 2001, it was the top-tier league. The league has 10–12 teams contesting and the top two teams gain promotion to the Karnataka Super Division.

=== League champions ===
Season	Champions	Ref.
1994–95	Indian Telephone Industries	
1995–96	Indian Telephone Industries	
1996–97	Indian Telephone Industries	
1997–98	Indian Telephone Industries	
1998–99	Indian Telephone Industries	
1999–00	Indian Telephone Industries	
2000	Hindustan Aeronautics Limited	
2005–06	Postal Department	
2006–07	Army Service Corps	
2007–08	Rail Wheel Factory	
2008–09	Dharmaraja Union	
2011–12	District Youth Sports Hostel	
2012–13	Jawahar Union	
2013–14	Department of Youth Empowerment and Sports	
2014–15	Income Tax	
2015–16	Accountants General's Office Recreation Club	
2016–17	Bangalore Independents	
2017–18	Bangalore Eagles	
2018–19	AGORC	
2019–20	FC Deccan	
2020–21	Bangalore United FC	
2023–24	Bangalore Eagles	

== KSFA B Division ==
KSFA B Division
- Organising body: Bangalore District Football Association (BDFA)
- Country: India
- Number of clubs: 14
- Level on pyramid: 8
- Promotion to: KSFA A Division
- Relegation to: KSFA C Division
- Current champions: Vijayanagara FC (2023–24)

The KSFA B Division formerly known as BDFA B Division is the fourth tier football league in the Indian state of Karnataka.

A total of 14 teams feature in this division, while the best 2 teams qualify for KSFA A Division.

=== League champions ===
Season	Champions	Ref.
2018–19	Bangalore Gunners	
2019–20		
2020–21	HAL	
2023–24	Vijayanagara FC	

== KSFA C Division ==
KSFA C Division
- Organising body: Bangalore District Football Association (BDFA)
- Country: India
- Number of clubs: 14
- Level on pyramid: 8
- Promotion to: KSFA B Division
- Relegation to: KSFA D Division

KSFA C Division formerly known as BDFA C Division is the fourth tier football league of Karnataka and forms the eighth tier in Indian football. Until 2024–25 season, the league was the lowest tier in Karnataka before the introduction of KSFA D Division in the 2025–26 season.

The league is conducted in two zones; North Bengaluru Zone and South Bengaluru Zone. Alchemy FA were crowned as the champions of North Bengaluru Zone in the 2025–26 edition of the KSFA C Divison league. While Bengaluru Champs won the South Zone in the same season.

== KSFA D Division ==
KSFA D Division
- Organising body: Bangalore District Football Association (BDFA)
- Country: India
- Number of clubs: Variable
- Level on pyramid: 9
- Promotion to: KSFA C Division
- Current champions: Zenit IFA (2026-27)

KSFA D Division introduced in 2025-26 season is the fifth tier football league in Karnataka and forms a ninth tier in Indian football. The league forms the absolute lowest tier in Karnataka and India.

== See also ==
- Karnataka State Football Association
