= Rail Wheel Factory =

Manufacturing unit of Indian Railways

Coordinates: 13.10149°N 77.58755°E

Rail Wheel Factory, Yelehanka Bangalore
- Company type: Manufacturing unit
- Industry: Wheels, coaches and locomotives
- Founded: 1984
- Headquarters: Yelahanka, Bangalore, India
- Owner: Indian Railways

Rail Wheel Factory, Yelahanka (RWF) (also known as Wheel and Axle Plant) is a manufacturing unit of the Indian Railways located in Yelahanka, Bangalore, Karnataka. It produces wheels, axles, and wheel sets for railway wagons, coaches, and locomotives, serving both Indian Railways and international customers. The unit was commissioned by C. K. Jaffer Sharief, the then Railway Minister, in 1984.

This factory uses cast steel technology in the manufacturing of wheels which utilizes scrap steel collected from Railways' own workshops as raw material. The products (Wheels, Axles and wheel sets) are engineered with little scope for human errors. It has a planned capacity to manufacture of about 70,000 wheels of different sizes, 23,000 axles and to assemble 23,000 wheel sets. It employs over 2000 personnel and has an annual turnover of about 82 crores. It is an ISO 9001:2000 and ISO 14001 certified unit for its business processes. It was the first unit of Indian Railways to receive ISO 9001:2008 accreditation.

== See also ==
- Banaras Locomotive Works, Varanasi
- Diesel Locomotive Factory, Marhowrah
- Chittaranjan Locomotive Works, Asansol
- Electric Locomotive Factory, Madhepura
- Integral Coach Factory, Chennai
- Modern Coach Factory, Raebareli
- Rail Coach Factory, Kapurthala
- Rail Wheel Plant, Bela
- Titagarh Wagons, Titagarh
- List of locomotive builders by countries
