= South United FC =

Indian association football club based in Bangalore

South United
- Full name: South United Football Club
- Nickname: SUFC
- Founded: 16 August 2012; 14 years ago
- Ground: South United Football Club, Ulsoor
- Owner: Sharan Parikh
- Head coach: Kaja Mohideen Bhadussa
- League: Karnataka Super Division
- Website: www.sufcindia.com
Home colours	Away colours

South United Football Club is an Indian professional football club based in Bangalore, Karnataka, that competes in the Karnataka Super Division. They have also competed in the I-League 2nd Division, then the second tier of the Indian football league system.

== History ==
South United Football Club was founded on 16 August 2012 in Bangalore with the long-term goal of providing a base for youngsters in the southern region to take up football as a professional career. In 2013, South United roped in Raman Vijayan as new head coach and Noel Wilson as their mentor. They began their league journey on 6 December 2012 in the 2012–13 BDFA Super Division, at the Bangalore Football Stadium against Army Service Corps, where the club won by 2–0. The former I-League player Gunashekar Vignesh scored the first ever goal for the club. South United then competed for the first time in the 2013 I-League 2nd Division. They started their journey in the country's second division by 3–4 loss to Luangmual FC on March 11. This followed by two 1–0 defeats against Vasco S.C. and Southern Samity. South United won their first match in the second division by beating Hindustan F.C. 2–0 on March 20. The club failed to go further, finishing fifth with two wins, a draw and four losses in qualifying group C. South United pulled out of second division next season after AIFF decided to end financial support. South United was the runner-up of the 2014–15 BDFA Super Division. In April 2015, the club was taken over by Sharan Parikh, a Mumbai-based businessman. They returned to the second division in the 2018–19 season. In August 2019, former Manchester City player Terry Phelan was appointed as technical director.

== Home ground ==
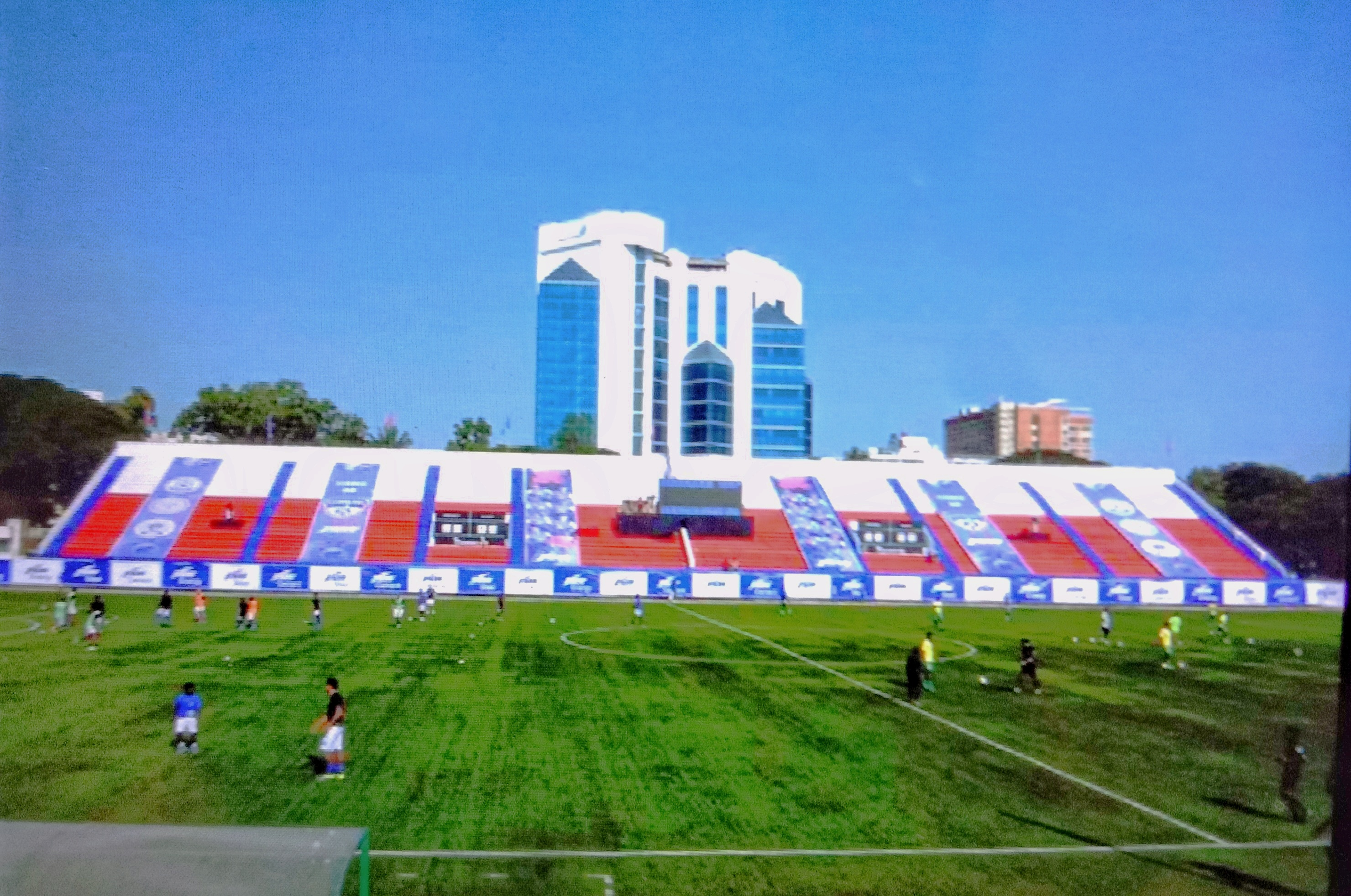
New Bengaluru Football Stadium in Karnataka, used as home ground of South United.

South United plays its home matches at the Bangalore Football Stadium, an astroturf stadium located in the Garden City. South United also has its own state-of-the-art facility in Ulsoor.

== Records ==
Season	Division	Teams	Position	Federation Cup/Super Cup	AFC Champions League Elite	AFC Cup
2013	2	26	17	DNQ	DNQ	DNQ
2014–2018	Did not participate				DNQ	DNQ
2018–19	2	16	Group stage		DNQ	DNQ

Key

- DNQ = did not qualify
- DNP = Did not play
- TBD = To be decided
- TBA = To be added
- PR = Preliminary Round

=== Season ===
As of 13 January 2018

Year	Division	League								League Cup	Top scorer(s)	
Year	Division	Pos.	P	W	D	L	GF	GA	Pts	League Cup	Player(s)	Goals
2013	2	PR	7	2	1	4	12	12	7	DNQ	(India) Amoes Do	5
2014–18	Did not participate											
2018–19	2	4th	8	1	4	3	6	12	5			

== Managerial history ==
As of 9 October 2023

Name	Nationality	From	To	P	W	D	L	GF	GA	Win%	Ref.
Raman Vijayan	India	2012	2014	7	2	1	4	12	12	28.57	
Miki Lladó	Spain	2018	2019	5	0	2	3	5	12	0.00	
Noel Wilson	India	2019	2019	3	1	2	0	1	0	33.33	
Alfred Fernandes	India	2019	2020								
Sachin Badadhe	India	2022	present								

== Honours ==
=== League ===
- BDFA Super Division
  - Runners-up (4): 2012–13, 2013–14, 2014–15, 2015–16
- Bangalore 'A' Division
  - Champions: 2022–23

=== Others ===
- Kedari Redekar Football Tournament
  - Champions (1): 2012
- South Indian Inter-state Invitational Cup
  - Champions (1): 2015
- Gadhinglaj United Cup
  - Third place (1): 2015
