= 2023–24 Indian State Leagues =

2023–24 season in the state football leagues of India

State leagues in India
- Season: 2023–24
- Dates: 5 July 2023 – 6 June 2024
- Promoted: 21 clubs

The 2023–24 Indian State leagues season represented the fifth tier of the Indian football league system, a series of state-level football tournaments played as qualifiers to determine teams for the 2024–25 I-League 3.

== Overview ==
Zone	State	League	Teams	League dates	Duration (months)	Champions	Runners-up	I-League 3 qualification
North	Delhi	Delhi Premier League	11	16 Nov 2023–19 Feb 2024	3	Garhwal Heroes	Royal Rangers	Garhwal Heroes
North	Punjab	Punjab State Super Football League	15	14 Aug–10 Dec 2023	4	Namdhari FC	Young FC	Dalbir FA
North	Haryana	Haryana Men’s Football League	8	10 May–5 June 2024	1	Bhuna	Heroes United	Bhuna
North-East
North-East	Manipur	Manipur Premier League	9	13 Dec 2023–29 Jan 2024	1	Southern SU	-	Southern SU
North-East	Manipur	Manipur Premier League	9	13 Dec 2023–29 Jan 2024	1	Asufii FA	-	Southern SU
North-East	Manipur	Manipur State League	15	7 Apr–22 May 2024	1.5	NISA	Liwachangning YCC	-
North-East	Mizoram	Mizoram Premier League	8	25 Aug–22 Dec 2023	4	Mizoram Police	Chanmari	Chanmari
North-East	Sikkim	Sikkim Premier Division League	8	3 Feb–4 Mar 2024	1	Singling SC	Thunderbolt North United	-
North-East	Assam	Assam State Premier League	8	01 Nov 2023–8 Jan 2024	2	Karbi Anglong Morning Star	United Chirang Duar	Karbi Anglong Morning Star
East
East	Odisha	2023 FAO League	8	5 July–30 Aug 2023	2	Sunrise Club	Sports Odisha	Sports Odisha
East	West Bengal (Kolkata)	2023 CFL Premier Division	26	25 June–30 Nov 2023	5	Mohammedan	East Bengal B	Diamond Harbour
East	Chhattisgarh	2024 Chhattisgarh Football League	7	18 April–6 June 2024	2	RKM	Brahmavid FA	RKM
West	Goa	2023–24 Goa Professional League	13	27 Aug 2023–1 May 2024	8	Sporting Goa	SESA	SESA
West	Gujarat	Gujarat SFA Club Championship	9	19 Nov 2023–31 Mar 2024	4	Charutar Vidya Mandal	Baroda FA	Charutar Vidya Mandal
West	Madhya Pradesh	Madhya Pradesh Premier League	6	10 Dec 2023–17 Jan 2024	1	Lake City	The Diamond Rock	Lake City
West	Maharashtra (Mumbai)	2023–24 Mumbai Premier League	16	30 Oct 2023–7 May 2024	6	MYJ–GMSC	Maharashtra Oranje	MYJ-GMSC
West	Rajasthan	2023-24 R-League A Division	9	8 Mar 2024–28 May 2024	2	Jaipur Elite	Brothers United	Jaipur Elite
South	Karnataka (Bengaluru)	2023–24 Bangalore Super Division	19	15 Aug–22 Nov 2023	3	Bengaluru B	Sporting Bengaluru	HAL SC
South	Kerala	2023–24 Kerala Premier League	20	25 Nov 2023–11 Feb 2024	2.5	Kerala United	SAT	SAT

== State leagues and standings ==
=== Goa ===
Pos	Team	Pld	W	D	L	GF	GA	GD	Pts	Qualification
1	Sporting Goa (C)	24	15	4	5	54	16	+38	49	
2	SESA	24	15	3	6	55	24	+31	48	Eligible for 2024-25 I-League 3 (Note: Since Sporting Goa and Dempo have already qualified for I-League 2 and I-League respectively, the next highest ranked team(s) are eligible for I-League 3.)
3	Dempo	24	13	7	4	43	21	+22	46	
4	Pax of Nagoa	24	13	5	6	46	22	+24	44	
5	FC Goa B	24	11	6	7	46	22	+24	39	
6	Cortalim Villagers	24	11	6	7	34	25	+9	39	
7	Geno SC	24	11	6	7	33	26	+7	39	
8	Calangute Association	24	10	4	10	40	33	+7	34	
9	Churchill Brothers	24	7	8	9	30	32	−2	29	
10	Guardian Angel	24	7	8	9	27	39	−12	29	
11	Vasco	24	6	4	14	22	49	−27	22	
12	Panjim Footballers	24	1	6	17	16	59	−43	9	
13	Young Boys of Tonca (R)	24	1	3	20	13	91	−78	6	Relegation to GFA First Division League

Source: Goa Professional League Official The Away End - Goa Pro League
Rules for classification: 1) points; 2) goal difference; 3) number of goals scored
(C) Champions; (R) Relegated

=== Karnataka ===
Pos	Team	Pld	W	D	L	GF	GA	GD	Pts	Qualification or relegation
1	Bengaluru B (Note: Bengaluru FC B being a reserve side are ineligible for promotion and will instead participate in the RFDL.) (C)	18	16	2	0	57	9	+48	50	Champions
2	SC Bengaluru (Note: SC Bengaluru have qualified for the 2023–24 I-League 2 via finishing in the top three of 2023–24 I-League 3 play-offs round.)	18	16	0	2	61	7	+54	48	
3	Bengaluru United (Note: FC Bengaluru United are in the 2023–24 I-League 2, the third tier of Indian football league system.)	18	14	3	1	51	16	+35	45	
4	HAL SC	18	10	3	5	31	19	+12	33	Eligible for 2024-25 I-League 3
5	Roots	18	10	2	6	30	19	+11	32	
6	South United	18	9	4	5	38	23	+15	31	
7	Kodagu	18	8	6	4	37	22	+15	30	
8	MEG	18	8	6	4	33	22	+11	30	
9	Kickstart	18	9	2	7	36	27	+9	29	
10	Agniputhra	18	9	2	7	39	42	−3	29	
11	Students Union	18	7	4	7	38	31	+7	25	
12	Bangalore Independents	18	7	3	8	27	28	−1	24	
13	ASC	18	6	2	10	32	38	−6	20	
14	Bangalore United FC	18	5	2	11	25	43	−18	17	
15	Real Chikkamagaluru	18	1	4	13	26	38	−12	7	
16	Rebels	18	4	2	12	20	46	−26	14	
17	Deccan (R)	18	3	5	10	15	36	−21	14	Relegation to 2024-25 BDFA A Division
18	Bangalore Dream United (R)	18	2	1	15	7	69	−62	7	Relegation to 2024-25 BDFA A Division
19	Young Challengers (R)	18	0	1	17	13	81	−68	1	Relegation to 2024-25 BDFA A Division

Source: BDFA Instagram
Rules for classification: 1) points; 2) goal difference; 3) number of goals scored
(C) Champions; (R) Relegated

=== Maharashtra ===
Pos	Team	Pld	W	D	L	GF	GA	GD	Pts	Qualification
1	MYJ–GMSC (C)	14	12	2	0	46	9	+37	38	2024–25 I-League 3 and 2024-25 MSSMFL
2	Maharashtra Oranje	14	10	2	2	50	12	+38	32	2024-25 MSSMFL
3	Hope United (KSA)	14	9	3	2	38	13	+25	30	
4	Millat	14	8	3	3	35	12	+23	27	
5	Reliance FYC	13	9	0	4	26	14	+12	27	
6	Kalina Rangers	13	8	1	4	41	19	+22	25	
7	Iron Born–Rudra	14	7	3	4	21	18	+3	24	
8	Mumbai Kenkre	13	7	1	5	31	18	+13	22	
9	DK Pharma	14	6	2	6	32	27	+5	20	
10	ICL Mumbai	14	4	2	8	26	25	+1	14	
11	CFCI	14	4	1	9	19	32	−13	13	
12	Silver Innings (Protrack)	14	3	0	11	9	54	−45	9	
13	Ambernath United–Bombay Muslims	14	2	0	12	6	40	−34	6	
14	Sellebrity	12	1	2	9	4	41	−37	5	
15	PIFA	14	0	2	12	4	57	−53	2	
16	Mumbai Knights (JMJ) (W)	0	0	0	0	0	0	0	0	Relegation to Mumbai Super League

Updated to match(es) played on 6 May 2024. Source: MFA official The Away End Football Counter
Rules for classification: 1) points; 2) goal difference; 3) number of goals scored
(C) Champions; (W) Withdrew

=== Kerala ===
Pos	Team	Pld	W	D	L	GF	GA	GD	Pts	
1	Kerala Police	5	4	1	0	9	1	+8	13	Advanced to Semi Finals
2	Kerala United	5	3	0	2	6	5	+1	9	Advanced to Semi Finals
3	Muthoot FA	5	2	2	1	5	3	+2	8	Advanced to Semi Finals
4	SAT Tirur	5	2	0	3	8	13	−5	6	Advanced to Semi Finals
5	Wayanad United	5	1	1	3	4	8	−4	4	
6	KSEB	5	1	0	4	6	9	−3	3	

Source: KFA
11 February 2024
19:00 IST

SAT Tirur	1–3	Kerala United
Yadhu		Lalsiem 90+3' (pen.); Vanlalmalsawma 90+8'; Muheeb 90+9'

Jawahar Stadium, Kannur

=== Odisha ===
Pos	Team	Pld	W	D	L	GF	GA	GD	Pts	Qualification
1	Sunrise Club (C)	7	6	1	0	16	3	+13	19	Qualification to 2023 FAO Super Cup, and eligible for 2023–24 I-League 3
2	Sports Odisha	7	4	2	1	14	11	+3	14	Qualification to 2023 FAO Super Cup, and eligible for 2023–24 I-League 3
3	Radha Raman Club	7	4	1	2	13	6	+7	13	Qualification to 2023 FAO Super Cup
4	Young Utkal Club	7	2	4	1	10	9	+1	10	Qualification to 2023 FAO Super Cup
5	Bidanasi Club	7	2	1	4	7	7	0	7	
6	Rising Student Club	7	2	0	5	11	15	−4	6	
7	Rovers Athletic Club	7	1	2	4	9	18	−9	5	
8	Odisha Police (R)	7	1	1	5	10	21	−11	4	Relegation to 2024 FAO Gold League

Source: Orisports
Rules for classification: 1) points; 2) head-to-head points; 3) head-to-head goal difference; 4) goal difference; 5) number of goals scored; 6) drawing of lots
(C) Champions; (R) Relegated

2023 FAO Super Cup Final

29 August 2023
17:00

Sunrise Club	0–1	Sports Odisha
	Report	Jagannath Tudu 78'

Barabati Stadium, Cuttack

=== Rajasthan ===
Pos	Team	Pld	W	D	L	GF	GA	GD	Pts	Qualification
1	Jaipur Elite (C)	16	13	2	1	53	6	+47	41	Eligible for 2024–25 I-League 3
2	Brothers United	16	12	2	2	45	7	+38	38	
3	Zinc Football	16	11	3	2	61	15	+46	36	
4	Aviva Sports Foundation	16	10	4	2	41	15	+26	34	
5	Royal FC Jaipur	16	5	3	8	19	33	−14	18	
6	Jaipur Futsal	16	3	3	10	9	31	−22	12	
7	Sunrise FC	16	2	4	10	13	45	−32	10	
8	ASL FC	16	2	2	12	13	55	−42	8	
9	Champion Maker Club	16	2	1	13	8	55	−47	7	

Updated to match(es) played on 28 May 2024. Source:
(C) Champions

=== West Bengal ===
Pos	Team	Pld	W	D	L	GF	GA	GD	Pts	Qualification
1	Mohammedan (C)	17	14	2	1	44	11	+33	44	Champions
2	East Bengal	17	13	3	1	50	10	+40	42	
3	Diamond Harbour (Q)	16	10	3	3	32	12	+20	33	Eligible for 2024–25 I-League 3 (Note: If the top teams are already playing in national leagues, then the next highest ranked team(s) would be eligible for I-League 3.)
4	Bhawanipore	16	8	4	4	26	18	+8	28	Eligible for 2024–25 I-League 3
5	Mohun Bagan SG	15	8	3	4	33	18	+15	25 (Note: Mohun Bagan Super Giant was deducted 2 points for not fielding a team against East Bengal on 30 November 2023.)	
6	Kidderpore	15	8	1	6	17	29	−12	25	

Source: The Away End
Rules for classification: 1) points; 2) goal difference; 3) number of goals scored; 4) head-to-head points; 5) head-to-head goal difference; 6) fair play ranking; 7) drawing of lots
(C) Champions; (Q) Qualified for the phase indicated

== See also ==
- 2023–24 Indian Super League (Tier I)
- 2023–24 I-League (Tier II)
- 2023–24 I-League 2 (Tier III)
- 2023–24 I-League 3 (Tier IV)
