= 2024–25 I-League 3 =

2nd season of the I-League 3

I-League 3
- The I-League 3 trophy
- Season: 2024–25
- Dates: 3 September – 6 October 2024
- Champions: Diamond Harbour
- Promoted: 2024–25 I-League 2: Diamond Harbour; Chanmari; SAT; KLASA; 2025–26 I-League 2: KAMS; MYJ–GMSC
- Relegated: 19 clubs
- Matches: 71
- Goals: 228 (3.21 per match)
- Top goalscorer: Himanshu Patil (7 goals)
- Biggest win: KLASA 8–0 Bhuna (5 September); Bhuna 0–8 KAMS (11 September)
- Highest scoring: KLASA 8–0 Bhuna (5 September); Bhuna 0–8 KAMS (11 September)
- Longest winning run: Chanmari (8 matches)
- Longest unbeaten run: Chanmari (8 matches)
- Longest winless run: Dalbir FA; Downtown Heroes (5 matches)
- Longest losing run: RKM (4 matches)
- Highest attendance: 11,160; Jaipur Elite–Karbi Anglong (7 September)
- Lowest attendance: 10; MYJ–GMSC–Abbas Union (3 October); Karbi Anglong–Downtown Heroes (2 October)
- Total attendance: 51,516
- Average attendance: 725

The 2024–25 I-League 3 was the 2nd season of the I-League 3 since its establishment in 2023, as the fourth tier of the Indian football league system. The top four clubs secured spot in the 2024–25 I-League 2. The winner of the tournament was Diamond Harbour winning 1–0 against Chanmari.

== Over view ==
The second season of I-League 3, 25 clubs were participated. Kerala United and KLASA were reinstated from 2023-24 I-League 3 and Maharashtra Oranje and Kenkre Fc were relegated from 2023-24 I-League 2. 21 clubs were promoted or nominated from State Football League 2023-24 season.

Total 25 clubs were participated in 5 group of 5 team. Each group champions and runner's up were promoted to final round group stages.A total of 10 teams that were promoted from the preliminary round were divided into 2 final round groups of 5 teams each. Each group champions and runner's up were promoted to 2024-25 I-League 2. Each group third place team were promoted to 2025-26 I-League 2. The rest of all teams were relegated to their State football league.

== Club changes ==
The following clubs have changed division since the 2023–24 season:

=== To I-League 3 ===
Promoted from State leagues

- 21 clubs

Reinstated from playoffs

- Kerala United
- KLASA

Relegated from I-League 2

- Maharashtra Oranje
- Kenkre

=== From I-League 3 ===
Relegated to State leagues

- 20 clubs

== Clubs ==
Locations of 2024-25 I-League 3 Group stage clubs
Group A
Group B
Group C
Group D
Group E

On 10 July 2024, the AIFF announced the list of 20 clubs that will participate in the season. The list consisted of 2 clubs relegated from 2023–24 I-League 2, 2 clubs retained from 2023–24 I-League 3 play-off, and 16 clubs nominated by state FAs. On 27 July, 4 more clubs were approved by the AIFF as a "one-time exception." Later, Southern Sporting Union from Imphal was added to the list, having topped the 2023-24 Manipur Premier League.

No.	Club	City	State	League	Position
1	Kerala United FC	Malappuram	Kerala	2023–24 I-League 3 Play-offs	4th
2	KLASA FC	Bishnupur	Manipur	2023–24 I-League 3 Play-offs	5th
3	Karbi Anglong Morning Star FC	Diphu	Assam	2023–24 Assam State Premier League	1st
4	Garhwal Heroes FC	New Delhi	Delhi	2023–24 Delhi Premier League	1st
5	Charutar Vidya Mandal FC	Vallabh Vidyanagar	Gujarat	2024 Gujarat SFA Club Championship	1st
6	Sesa FA	Sanquelim	Goa	2023–24 Goa Professional League	2nd
7	Bhuna FC	Bhuna	Haryana	2024 Haryana Men's Football League	1st
8	Diamond Harbour FC	Diamond Harbour	West Bengal	2023 Calcutta Football League	3rd
9	HAL SC	Bengaluru	Karnataka	2023–24 Bangalore Super Division	4th
10	SAT	Tirur	Kerala	2023–24 Kerala Premier League	Runners-Up
11	Lakecity FC	Bhopal	Madhya Pradesh	2023–24 Madhya Pradesh Premier League	1st
12	Chanmari FC	Aizawl	Mizoram	2023–24 Mizoram Premier League	Runners-Up
13	Sports Odisha	Bhubaneswar	Odisha	2023 FAO Super Cup	Champions
14	Dalbir FA	Patiala	Punjab	2023–24 Punjab State Super League	3rd
15	Jaipur Elite FC	Jaipur	Rajasthan	2023-24 R–League A Division	1st
16	Ghaziabad City FC	Ghaziabad	Uttar Pradesh	2024 Ghaziabad District League	1st
17	MYJ–GMSC	Mumbai	Maharashtra	2023–24 Mumbai Premier League	1st
18	RKM FA	Narainpur	Chhattisgarh	2024 Chhattisgarh Football League	1st
19	Maharashtra Oranje FC	Mumbai	Maharashtra	2023–24 I-League 2	7th
20	Kenkre FC	Mumbai	Maharashtra	2023–24 I-League 2	8th
21	Abbas Union FC	Hyderabad	Telangana	–	–
22	Downtown Heroes FC	Srinagar	Jammu and Kashmir	–	–
23	Coramandal FC	Vishakhapatnam	Andhra Pradesh	–	–
24	Corbett FC	Rudrapur	Uttarakhand	–	–
25	Southern SU	Imphal	Manipur	2023–24 Manipur Premier League	1st

== Venues ==
Group	City	Stadium	Capacity
A	Naihati	Naihati Stadium	25,000
B	Old Goa	Ella Ground	2,000
B	Mapusa	Duler Stadium	10,000
C	Aizawl	Rajiv Gandhi Stadium	20,000
D	Diphu	KASA Stadium	9,000
E	Srinagar	TRC Stadium	10,000
Playoffs A	Naihati	Naihati Stadium	25,000
Playoffs B	Kalyani	Kalyani Stadium	20,000

== Group stage ==
=== Group A ===
Pos	Team	Pld	W	D	L	GF	GA	GD	Pts	Qualification	DHB	SAT	LKC	SPO	GHZ
1	Diamond Harbour (H)	4	3	0	1	11	4	+7	9	Advanced to Play-offs			3–0		3–0
2	SAT	4	2	1	1	7	6	+1	7 (Note: Head-to-head points: SAT 1, Lakecity 1. Goal difference: SAT +1, Lakecity +1. Goals scored: SAT 7, Lakecity 7. Goal difference vs Diamond Harbour: SAT -2, Lakecity -3.)	Advanced to Play-offs	2–4			2–0	
3	Lakecity	4	2	1	1	7	6	+1	7	Relegated to State leagues		1–1		3–1	3–1
4	Sports Odisha	4	1	1	2	4	7	−3	4	Relegated to State leagues	2–1				1–1
5	Ghaziabad City	4	0	1	3	3	9	−6	1	Relegated to State leagues		1–2			

Source: i-league.org The Away End
Rules for classification: 1) points; 2) head-to-head points; 3) goal difference; 4) goals scored; 5) goal difference vs. qualified club 6) toss of coin
(H) Hosts

=== Group B ===
Pos	Team	Pld	W	D	L	GF	GA	GD	Pts	Qualification	SES	DAL	GAR	KUN	MOJ
1	Sesa (H)	4	2	2	0	6	4	+2	8	Advanced to Play-offs			2–1		2–2
2	Dalbir	4	2	0	2	4	6	−2	6 (Note: Head-to-head points: Dalbir 3, Garhwal 0.)	Advanced to Play-offs	1–2			0–3	
3	Garhwal Heroes	4	2	0	2	6	6	0	6	Relegated to State leagues		0–1		1–0	4–3
4	Kerala United	4	1	2	1	5	3	+2	5	Relegated to State leagues	0–0				2–2
5	Maharashtra Oranje	4	0	2	2	8	10	−2	2	Relegated to State leagues		1–2			

Source: i-league.org The Away End
Rules for classification: 1) points; 2) head-to-head points; 3) goal difference; 4) goals scored; 5) goal difference vs. qualified club 6) toss of coin
(H) Hosts

=== Group C ===
Pos	Team	Pld	W	D	L	GF	GA	GD	Pts	Qualification	CFC	MYJ	HAL	COR	RKM
1	Chanmari (H)	4	4	0	0	12	2	+10	12	Advanced to Play-offs		1–0		3–1	
2	MYJ–GMSC	4	2	1	1	10	3	+7	7 (Note: Head-to-head points: MYJ 1, HAL 1. Goal difference: MYJ +7, HAL +6.)	Advanced to Play-offs			1–1	4–0	5–1
3	HAL	4	2	1	1	9	3	+6	7	Relegated to State leagues	1–2				2–0
4	Coramandal	4	1	0	3	4	12	−8	3	Relegated to State leagues			0–5		
5	RKM	4	0	0	4	1	16	−15	0	Relegated to State leagues	0–6			0–3	

Source: i-league.org The Away End
Rules for classification: 1) points; 2) head-to-head points; 3) goal difference; 4) goals scored; 5) goal difference vs. qualified club 6) toss of coin
(H) Hosts

=== Group D ===
Pos	Team	Pld	W	D	L	GF	GA	GD	Pts	Qualification	KLA	KAM	KEN	JEL	BHU
1	KLASA	4	3	1	0	12	2	+10	10	Advanced to Play-offs			1–1	1–0	8–0
2	Karbi Anglong Morning Star (H)	4	3	0	1	16	3	+13	9	Advanced to Play-offs	1–2		3–1		
3	Kenkre	4	2	1	1	8	8	0	7	Relegated to State leagues					3–2
4	Jaipur Elite	4	0	1	3	3	9	−6	1	Relegated to State leagues		0–4	2–3		
5	Bhuna	4	0	1	3	3	20	−17	1	Relegated to State leagues		0–8		1–1	

Source: i-league.org The Away End
(H) Hosts

=== Group E ===
Pos	Team	Pld	W	D	L	GF	GA	GD	Pts	Qualification	ABU	DTH	CVM	SSU	CFC
1	Abbas Union	4	3	0	1	4	2	+2	9	Advanced to Play-offs				1–0	
2	Downtown Heroes (H)	4	2	1	1	10	5	+5	7	Advanced to Play-offs	2–0				1–2
3	CVM	4	2	0	2	5	8	−3	6	Relegated to State leagues	0–1	1–5			
4	Southern Sporting	4	1	1	2	5	5	0	4	Relegated to State leagues		2–2	1–2		
5	Corbett	4	1	0	3	3	7	−4	3	Relegated to State leagues	0–2		1–2	0–2	

Source: i-league.org The Away End
(H) Hosts

== Playoffs ==
The top two clubs from each group qualified for the playoffs. Matches took place from 25 September to 6 October in Naihati and Kalyani, West Bengal.

=== Group A ===
Pos	Team	Pld	W	D	L	GF	GA	GD	Pts	Promotion	DHB	KLA	KAM	SES	DTH
1	Diamond Harbour (H)	4	4	0	0	10	2	+8	12	24/25 I-League 2 and Final		2–0	4–1		
2	KLASA	4	2	1	1	4	4	0	7	24/25 I-League 2			2–1	0–0	2–1
3	Karbi Anglong Morning Star	4	2	0	2	11	8	+3	6	25/26 I-League 2					6–0
4	Sesa	4	1	1	2	5	7	−2	4	Relegated to State leagues	0–3		2–3		
5	Downtown Heroes	4	0	0	4	3	12	−9	0	Relegated to State leagues	1–2			1–3	

(H) Hosts

=== Group B ===
Pos	Team	Pld	W	D	L	GF	GA	GD	Pts	Promotion	CFC	SAT	MYJ	ABU	DAL
1	Chanmari	4	4	0	0	10	1	+9	12	24/25 I-League 2 and Final				2–1	3–0
2	SAT	4	2	1	1	8	6	+2	7	24/25 I-League 2	0–3		3–1		3–0
3	MYJ–GMSC	4	2	0	2	4	5	−1	6	25/26 I-League 2	0–2			1–0	
4	Abbas Union	4	0	2	2	4	6	−2	2	Relegated to State leagues		2–2			1–1
5	Dalbir	4	0	1	3	1	9	−8	1	Relegated to State leagues			0–2		

== Final ==
6 October 2024
15:00 IST

Diamond Harbour	1–0	Chanmari
Ragav Gupta 30'	Report

Naihati Stadium, Naihati
Attendance: 500
Referee: Ashwin

== Statistics ==
=== Top scorers ===
Rank	Player	Club	Goals
1	(India) Naro Hari Shrestha	Diamond Harbour	8
1	(India) Kevisanyu Peseyie	Karbi Anglong Morning Star	8
1	(India) Himanshu Patil	MYJ–GMSC	8
4	(India) Vincent Lalduhawma	Chanmari	6
5	(India) Aimar Adam	Diamond Harbour	5
5	(India) H Robinson Khongsai	Karbi Anglong Morning Star	5

== Attendances ==
=== Group Stage ===
Match No.	Group A		Match No.	Group B		Match No.	Group C	
Match No.	Fixture	Attendance	Match No.	Fixture	Attendance	Match No.	Fixture	Attendance
1	Diamond Harbour–Ghaziabad City	100	1	Sesa–Maharashtra Oranje	50	1	HAL–RKM	152
2	SAT–Sports Odisha	75	2	Dalbir–Kerala United	50	2	Chanmari–Coramandal	273
3	Lakecity–SAT	75	3	Garhwal Heroes–Dalbir	50	3	MYJ–GMSC–HAL	123
4	Sports Odisha–Ghaziabad City	75	4	Kerala United–Maharashtra Oranje	50	4	RKM–Coramandal	223
5	Sports Odisha–Diamond Harbour	100	5	Kerala United–Sesa	50	5	MYJ–GMSC–Coramandal	109
6	Lakecity–Ghaziabad City	75	6	Garhwal Heroes–Maharashtra Oranje	50	6	RKM–Chanmari	152
7	Ghaziabad City–SAT	75	7	Maharashtra Oranje–Dalbir	50	7	Coramandal–HAL	108
8	Diamond Harbour–Lakecity	100	8	Sesa–Garhwal Heroes	50	8	Chanmari–MYJ–GMSC	532
9	Lakecity–Sports Odisha	75	9	Garhwal Heroes–Kerala United	40	9	MYJ–GMSC–RKM	42
10	SAT–Diamond Harbour	150	10	Dalbir–Sesa	80	10	HAL–Chanmari	852
Group A Total		900	Group B Total		520	Group C Total		2,566
Match No.	Group D		Match No.	Group E				
Match No.	Fixture	Attendance	Match No.	Fixture	Attendance			
1	Bhuna–Jaipur Elite	1,250	1	Downtown Heroes–Abbas Union	50			
2	Karbi Anglong–Kenkre	9,600	2	Southern Sporting–CVM	20			
3	KLASA–Bhuna	350	3	Corbett–Southern Sporting	20			
4	Jaipur Elite–Kenkre	750	4	CVM–Abbas Union	30			
5	KLASA–Kenkre	125	5	CVM–Downtown Heroes	50			
6	Jaipur Elite–Karbi Anglong	11,160	6	Corbett–Abbas Union	30			
7	Kenkre–Bhuna	50	7	Abbas Union–Southern Sporting	20			
8	Karbi Anglong–KLASA	10,600	8	Downtown Heroes–Corbett	100			
9	KLASA–Jaipur Elite	185	9	Corbett–CVM	20			
10	Bhuna–Karbi Anglong	10,820	10	Southern Sporting–Downtown Heroes	200			
Group D Total		44,890	Group E Total		540			

=== Playoffs ===
Match No.	Group A		Match No.	Group B	
Match No.	Fixture	Attendance	Match No.	Fixture	Attendance
1	Diamond Harbour–Karbi Anglong	120	1	Abbas Union–Dalbir	150
2	Downtown Heroes–Sesa	50	2	MYJ–GMSC–Chanmari	30
3	KLASA–Downtown Heroes	120	3	SAT–MYJ–GMSC	15
4	Sesa–Karbi Anglong	200	5	Chanmari–Abbas Union	70
5	Sesa–Diamond Harbour	250	4	Chanmari–Dalbir	60
6	KLASA–Karbi Anglong	50	6	SAT–Dalbir	25
7	Karbi Anglong–Downtown Heroes	10	7	Dalbir–MYJ–GMSC	30
8	Diamond Harbour–KLASA	200	8	Abbas Union–SAT	70
9	KLASA–Sesa	25	9	SAT–Chanmari	15
10	Downtown Heroes–Diamond Harbour	200	10	MYJ–GMSC–Abbas Union	10
Group A Total		1,125	Group B Total		475

Final	Attendance
Diamond Harbour–Chanmari	500

Legend: Highest Lowest
Updated to game(s) played on 6 October 2024
Source: I-League

== See also ==
- Men
  - 2024–25 Indian Super League (Tier I)
  - 2024–25 I-League (Tier II)
  - 2024–25 I-League 2 (Tier III)
  - 2024–25 Indian State Leagues (Tier V)
  - 2025 Super Cup (April)
  - 2024 Durand Cup
- Women
  - 2024–25 Indian Women's League
  - 2024–25 Indian Women's League 2
