= 2023–24 in Indian football =

Football in India
- Season: 2023–24

Men's football
- ISL: Shield: Mohun Bagan SG; Cup: Mumbai City
- I-League: Mohammedan
- I-League 2: Sporting Bengaluru
- I-League 3: Sporting Goa
- Super Cup: East Bengal
- Durand Cup: Mohun Bagan SG

Women's football
- IWL: Odisha
- IWL 2: Sreebhumi

The 2023–24 season was the 136th competitive association football season in India. The domestic season begins in August 2023, while the national team season commences in July 2023.

== National teams ==
=== Indian national football team ===
Results and fixtures

==== Friendlies ====
9 June 2023 2023 Intercontinental Cup	India	2–0	Mongolia	Bhubaneswar, India
19:30 UTC+5:30	Samad 2'; Chhangte 14'	Report		Stadium: Kalinga Stadium; Referee: Songkran Bunmeekiart (Thailand)

12 June 2023 2023 Intercontinental Cup	Vanuatu	0–1	India	Bhubaneswar, India
19:30 UTC+5:30		Report	Chhetri 81'	Stadium: Kalinga Stadium; Referee: Virendha Rai (Bhutan)

15 June 2023 2023 Intercontinental Cup	India	0–0	Lebanon	Bhubaneswar, India
19:30 UTC+5:30		Report		Stadium: Kalinga Stadium; Referee: Javiz Mohamed (Maldives)

18 June 2023 2023 Intercontinental Cup Final	India	2–0	Lebanon	Bhubaneswar, India
19:30 UTC+5:30	Chhetri 46'; Chhangte 65'	Report		Stadium: Kalinga Stadium; Attendance: 12,600; Referee: Virendha Rai (Bhutan)

7 September 2023 2023 King's Cup SF	Iraq	2–2 (5–4 p)	India	Chiang Mai, Thailand
16:00 UTC+5:30	Al-Hamadi 28' (pen.); Hussein 80' (pen.)	Report	N. M. Singh 16'; Hassan 51' (o.g.)	Stadium: 700th Anniversary Stadium; Attendance: 2,884; Referee: Wiwat Jumpaoon (Thailand)
	Penalties
	Doski (penalty scored); Kadhim (penalty scored); Al-Saedi (penalty scored); Al-Hamawi (penalty scored); Resan (penalty scored)		(penalty missed) Fernandes; (penalty scored) Jhingan; (penalty scored) Wangjam; (penalty scored) A. Ali; (penalty scored) R. Ali
Note: Iraq wins on penalties

10 September 2023 2023 King's Cup 3rd	Lebanon	1–0	India	Chiang Mai, Thailand
16:00 UTC+5:30	Kassem 77'	Report		Stadium: 700th Anniversary Stadium; Attendance: 13,567; Referee: Torpong Somsingha (Thailand)

13 October 2023 2023 Merdeka Tournament SF	Malaysia	4–2	India	Kuala Lumpur, Malaysia
18:30 UTC+5:30	Cools 7'; Hanapi 20' (pen.); Halim 42'; Corbin-Ong 61'	Report	N. M. Singh 13'; Chhetri 51'	Stadium: Bukit Jalil National Stadium; Referee: Mongkolchai Pechhri (Thailand)

==== 2023 SAFF Championship ====
21 June 2023 2023 SAFF Championship GS	India	4–0	Pakistan	Bangalore, India
19:30 UTC+5:30	Chhetri 10', 16' (pen.), 74' (pen.); Udanta 81'	Report		Stadium: Sree Kanteerava Stadium; Attendance: 22,860; Referee: Prajwol Chhetri (Nepal)

24 June 2023 2023 SAFF Championship GS	Nepal	0–2	India	Bangalore, India
19:30 UTC+5:30		Report	Chhetri 61'; Mahesh 70'	Stadium: Sree Kanteerava Stadium; Attendance: 12,642; Referee: Sinan Hussain (Maldives)

27 June 2023 2023 SAFF Championship GS	India	1–1	Kuwait	Bangalore, India
19:30 UTC+5:30	Chhetri 45+2'	Report	A. Ali 90+2' (o.g.)	Stadium: Sree Kanteerava Stadium; Attendance: 9,562; Referee: Md Alamgir Sarker (Bangladesh)

1 July 2023 2023 SAFF Championship SF	Lebanon	0–0 (a.e.t.) (2–4 p)	India	Bangalore, India
19:30 UTC+5:30		Report		Stadium: Sree Kanteerava Stadium; Attendance: 19,640; Referee: Sinan Hussain (Maldives)
	Penalties
	Maatouk (penalty missed); Shour (penalty scored); Sadek (penalty scored); Bader (penalty missed)		(penalty scored) Chhetri; (penalty scored) A. Ali; (penalty scored) Mahesh; (penalty scored) Udanta
Note: India wins on penalties

4 July 2023 2023 SAFF Championship Final	Kuwait	1–1 (a.e.t.) (4–5 p)	India	Bangalore, India
19:30 UTC+5:30	Al-Khaldi 14'	Report	Chhangte 36'	Stadium: Sree Kanteerava Stadium; Attendance: 26,380; Referee: Prajwol Chhetri (Nepal)
	Penalties
	Daham (penalty missed); Al Otaibi (penalty scored); Al-Dhefiri (penalty scored); Naji (penalty scored); Al-Khaldi (penalty scored); Hajeyah (penalty missed)		(penalty scored) Chhetri; (penalty scored) Jhingan; (penalty scored) Chhangte; (penalty missed) Udanta; (penalty scored) S. Bose; (penalty scored) Mahesh
Note: India wins on penalties

==== 2026 FIFA World Cup qualification / 2027 AFC Asian Cup qualification ====
16 November 2023 2026 WCQ R2 / 2027 ACQ R2	Kuwait	0–1	India	Kuwait City, Kuwait
19:30 UTC+3		Report	Manvir 75'	Stadium: Jaber Al-Ahmad International Stadium; Attendance: 32,786; Referee: Shaun Evans (Australia)

21 November 2023 2026 WCQ R2 / 2027 ACQ R2	India	0–3	Qatar	Bhubaneswar, India
19:00 UTC+5:30		Report	Meshaal 4'; Ali 47'; Abdurisag 86'	Stadium: Kalinga Stadium; Attendance: 11,389; Referee: Sivakorn Pu-udom (Thailand)

21 March 2024 2026 WCQ R2 / 2027 ACQ R2	Afghanistan	0–0	India	Damac, Saudi Arabia
00:30 IST UTC+05:30				Stadium: Damac Stadium; Attendance: 6000

26 March 2024 2026 WCQ R2 / 2027 ACQ R2	India	1–2	Afghanistan	Guwahati, India
19:00 IST UTC+05:30	Chettri 38' (pen.)		Akbari 70'; Mukhammad 88' (pen.)	Stadium: Indira Gandhi Athletic Stadium; Attendance: 8,932

==== 2023 AFC Asian Cup ====
Pos	Team	Pld	W	D	L	GF	GA	GD	Pts	Qualification
1	Australia	3	2	1	0	4	1	+3	7	Advance to knockout stage
2	Uzbekistan	3	1	2	0	4	1	+3	5	Advance to knockout stage
3	Syria	3	1	1	1	1	1	0	4	Advance to knockout stage
4	India	3	0	0	3	0	6	−6	0	

Source: AFC

13 January 2024 2023 AFC Asian Cup GS	Australia	2–0	India	Al Rayyan, Qatar
17:00 UTC+5:30		Report		Stadium: Ahmad bin Ali Stadium; Attendance: 36253; Referee: Yoshimi Yamashita

18 January 2024 2023 AFC Asian Cup GS	India	0–3	Uzbekistan	Doha, Qatar
20:00 UTC+5:30				Stadium: Abdullah bin Khalifa Stadium; Attendance: 38491; Referee: Ming Fu

23 January 2024 2023 AFC Asian Cup GS	Syria	1–0	India	Al Wakrah, Qatar
17:00 UTC+5:30		Report		Stadium: Al Janoub Stadium; Attendance: 42787; Referee: Sivakorn Pu-udom

=== U-23 ===
==== 2024 AFC U-23 Asian Cup qualifiers ====
6 September 2023 2024 AFC U23 Q	India	Cancelled	Maldives	Dalian, China
		Report		Stadium: Dalian Sports Centre Stadium

9 September 2023 2024 AFC U23 Q	China	2–1	India	Dalian, China
19:35	Tao Qianglong 68' (pen.); Nebijan 90+6'	Report	Hu Hetao 90+3' (o.g.)	Stadium: Dalian Sports Centre Stadium; Referee: Mohammad Arafah (Jordan)

12 September 2023 2024 AFC U23 Q	United Arab Emirates	3–0	India	Dalian, China
16:30	Al Baloushi 26'; Al Ameeri 33'; Khalfan 64'	Report		Stadium: Dalian Sports Centre Stadium

==== 2022 Asian Games ====
19 September 2023 2022 Asian Games	China	5–1	India	Hangzhou, China
17:00 UTC+5:30	Tianyi 17'; Wai Tsun 51'; Qianglonh 72', 75'; Hao 90+2'	Report	Praveen 45'	Stadium: Huanglong Sports Centre Stadium; Attendance: 34,513; Referee: Thoriq Alkatiri (Indonesia)

21 September 2023 2022 Asian Games	India	1–0	Bangladesh	Xiaoshan, China
13:30 UTC+5:30	Chhetri 85' (pen.)	Report		Stadium: Xiaoshan Sports Centre; Attendance: 5,232; Referee: Clifford Daypuyat (Philippines)

24 September 2023 2022 Asian Games	Myanmar	1–1	India	Xiaoshan, China
17:00 UTC+5:30	Kyaw Htwe 74'	Report	Chhetri 23'	Stadium: Xiaoshan Sports Centre; Attendance: 6,315; Referee: Qasim Matar Al Hatmi (Oman)

28 September 2023 2022 Asian Games	India	0–2	Saudi Arabia	Hangzhou, China
17:00 UTC+5:30		Report	Maran 52', 58'	Stadium: Huanglong Sports Centre Stadium; Attendance: 37,066; Referee: Shen Yinhao (China)

=== U-20 ===
==== 2023 SAFF U-19 Championship ====
21 September 2023 2023 SAFF U-19 GS	Bangladesh	0–3	India	Kathmandu, Nepal
13:30 UTC+05:45		Report	Goyary 1' N. Meetei 45+5' Oinam 90'	Stadium: Dashrath Stadium; Attendance: 201; Referee: Nadheem Ali (Maldives)

25 September 2023 2023 SAFF U-19 GS	India	2–1	Bhutan	Kathmandu, Nepal
17:30 UTC+05:45	Goyary 37'; R. Meetei 64'	Report	J. Namgyel 20'	Stadium: Dashrath Stadium; Attendance: 425; Referee: Nabin Maharjan (Nepal)

27 September 2023 2023 SAFF U-19 SF	India	1–1 (3–2 p)	Nepal	Kathmandu, Nepal
17:30	Sahil Khurshid 26'	Report	Samir Tamang 74'	Stadium: Dashrath Stadium; Attendance: 12,656; Referee: Adnan Anjum (Pakistan)
	Penalties
	Oinam (penalty scored); Soubam (penalty missed); Goyary (penalty scored); R. Meetei (penalty missed); Kipgen (penalty scored)		Ghorasainee (penalty scored); Laksam (penalty missed); Deuba (penalty scored); L. Thapa (penalty missed); B. Tamang (penalty missed)

30 September 2023 2023 SAFF U-19 Final	Pakistan	0–3	India	Kathmandu, Nepal
17:30		Report	Kipgen 64', 85'; Goyary 90+5'	Stadium: Dashrath Stadium; Attendance: 1,615; Referee: Nadheem Ali (Maldives)

=== U-17 ===
==== Friendlies ====
6 June 2023 Hybrid Friendly	Muangthong United U17 (Thailand)	0–3	India	Khoyai, Thailand
14:30 UTC+5:30		Report	Korou 11'; Meetei 77'; Guite 79'	Stadium: Kirin Valley Sports Complex

9 June 2023 Hybrid Friendly	Nakhon Ratchasima U17 (Thailand)	0–6 (Note: Closed door friendly)	India	Thailand

==== 2023 AFC U-17 Asian Cup ====
17 June 2023 2023 AFC U-17 AC GS	India	1–1	Vietnam	Pathum Thani, Thailand
17:30 UTC+5:30	M. S. Thokchom 69'	Report	Long Vũ 44'	Stadium: Thammasat Stadium; Attendance: 108; Referee: Nasrullo Kabirov (Tajikistan)

20 June 2023 2023 AFC U-17 AC GS	Uzbekistan	1–0	India	Pathum Thani, Thailand
17:30 UTC+5:30	Reimov 81'	Report		Stadium: Thammasat Stadium; Attendance: 98; Referee: Yinhao Shen (China)

23 June 2023 2023 AFC U-17 AC GS	Japan	8–4	India	Bangkok, Thailand
17:30 UTC+5:30	Kawamura 13' (penalty missed) 68'; Nawata 41', 45'; Nagano 52'; Mochizuki 54'; Nakajima 74'; Yamaguchi 90+6'; Sugiura 90+8'	Report	Panwar 47'; Meitei 62'; Miyagawa 69' (o.g.); Thingujam 79'	Stadium: Rajamangala Stadium; Referee: Nasrullo Kabirov (Tajikistan)

==== 2023 SAFF U-16 Championship ====
2 September 2023 2023 SAFF U-16 GS	Bangladesh	0–1	India	Thimphu, Bhutan
15:00 UTC+06:00		Report	T. Singh 75'	Stadium: Changlimithang Stadium; Attendance: 720; Referee: Penjor Ugyen (Bhutan)

6 September 2023 2023 SAFF U-16 GS	India	1–0	Nepal	Thimphu, Bhutan
15:00 UTC+06:00	Arbash 33'	Report		Stadium: Changlimithang Stadium; Attendance: 545; Referee: Hussain Zaheer (Maldives)

8 September 2023 2023 SAFF U-16 SF	India	8–0	Maldives	Thimphu, Bhutan
13:30 UTC+06:00	Yadav 22'; Kaif 36'; Zangminlun 53'; Kharthangmaw 62' 82'; Malngiang 70'; Arbash 77' 84'	Report		Stadium: Changlimithang Stadium; Attendance: 260; Referee: Byanjankar Kabin (Nepal)

10 September 2023 2023 SAFF U-16 Final	India	2–0	Bangladesh	Thimphu, Bhutan
18:00 UTC+06:00	Lairenjam 9'; Zangminlun 74'	Report		Stadium: Changlimithang Stadium; Attendance: 4,700; Referee: Hussain Zaheer (Maldives)

=== Indian women's national football team ===
==== 2022 Asian Games ====
21 September 2023 2022 Asian Games	Chinese Taipei	2–1	India	Wenzhou, China
17:00 UTC+5:30	Li-chin 68'; Yu-hsuan 84'	Report	Tamang 46'	Stadium: Wenzhou Olympic Stadium; Attendance: 5,681; Referee: Casey Reibelt (Australia)

24 September 2023 2022 Asian Games	India	0–1	Thailand	Wenzhou, China
13:30 UTC+5:30		Report	Thongrong 51'	Stadium: Wenzhou Olympic Stadium; Attendance: 16,047; Referee: Le Thi Ly (Vietnam)

==== 2024 Olympic qualifiers ====
26 October 2023 2024 Olympic Q 2R	Japan	7–0	India	Tashkent, Uzbekistan
15:30 UTC+5:30	Nakashima 17', 46'; Hayashi 53'; Tanaka 54'; Moriya 56'; Seike 73'; Naomoto 81'	Report		Stadium: Lokomotiv Stadium; Attendance: 100; Referee: Yang Shu-ting (Chinese Taipei)

29 October 2023 2024 Olympic Q 2R	India	1–3	Vietnam	Tashkent, Uzbekistan
15:30 UTC+5:30	R. Sandhiya 80'	Report	Huỳnh Như 4'; Trần Thị 22'; Phạm Hải Yến 73'	Stadium: Lokomotiv Stadium; Referee: Pansa Chaisanit (Thailand)

1 November 2023 2024 Olympic Q 2R	Uzbekistan	3–0	India	Tashkent, Uzbekistan
17:30 UTC+5:30	Kudratova 2'; Karachik 51', 83'	Report		Stadium: Bunyodkor Stadium; Referee: Veronika Bernatskaya (Kyrgyz Republic)

==== 2024 Turkish Women's Cup ====
21 February 2024 2024 Turkish Women's Cup	India	4–3	Estonia	Alanya, Turkey
19:00 UTC+5:30	Kalyan 17', 81'; Kathiresan 62'; Xaxa 79'	Report	Tammik 32'; Kubassova 88'; Lillemäe 90'	Stadium: Gold City Sport Complex

24 February 2024 2024 Turkish Women's Cup	India	2–0	Hong Kong	Alanya, Turkey
19:00 UTC+5:30	Tamang 19'; Guguloth 79'	Report		Stadium: Gold City Sport Complex

27 February 2024 2024 Turkish Women's Cup	Kosovo	1–0	India	Alanya, Turkey
16:00 UTC+5:30	Memeti 90+2'	Report		Stadium: Gold City Sport Complex

=== U-20 ===
==== 2024 SAFF U-19 Women's Championship ====
2 February 2024 SAFF U-19 GS	India	10–0	Bhutan	Dhaka, Bangladesh
15:00 BST (UTC+06:00)	Sibani Devi 8', 19', 36'; Pooja 31', 58', 59', 90+4'; Sulanjana Raul 52'; Menaka Devi 61'; Arina Devi 73'	Report		Stadium: BSSS M. Kamal Stadium

4 February 2024 SAFF U-19 GS	Bangladesh	1–0	India	Dhaka, Bangladesh
19:00 BST (UTC+06:00)	Mst. Sagorika 90+2'	Report		Stadium: BSSS M. Kamal Stadium

6 February 2024 SAFF U-19 GS	India	4–0	Nepal	Dhaka, Bangladesh
15:00 BST (UTC+06:00)	Neha 54', 81'; Sulanjana Raul 86'; Cindy Remruatpuii Colney 90+3'	Report		Stadium: BSSS M. Kamal Stadium

8 February 2024 SAFF U-19 GS	Bangladesh	1–1 (11–11 p)	India	Dhaka, Bangladesh
18:00 BST (UTC+06:00)	Mst. Sagorika 90+3'	Report	Sibani Devi 8'	Stadium: BSSS M. Kamal Stadium
	Penalties
	Afeida Khandaker (penalty scored); Mst Surma Jannat (penalty scored); Mst Joynob Bibi Rita (penalty scored); Sapna Rani (penalty scored); Munki Akhter (penalty scored); Mst Eity Khatun (penalty scored); Mst Sultana Akter (penalty scored); Umehla Marma (penalty scored); Mst. Sagorika (penalty scored); Kanon Rani Bahadur (penalty scored); Swarna Rani Mandal (penalty scored)		(penalty scored) Neha; (penalty scored) Nitu Linda; (penalty scored) Sibani Devi Nongmeikapam; (penalty scored) Lalita Boypai; (penalty scored) Thoibisana Chanu Toijam; (penalty scored) Sulanjana Raul; (penalty scored) Viskit Bara; (penalty scored) Pooja; (penalty scored) Heena Khatun; (penalty scored) Sonibia Devi Irom; (penalty scored) Anika Devi Sharubam

=== U-17 ===
==== 2024 AFC U-17 Women's Asian Cup qualifiers Round 2 ====
19 September 2023 AFC U-17 Q 2R	South Korea	8–0	India	Buriram, Thailand
15:00 UTC+5:30	Ju–ha 13'; Jueun 28' (pen.), 47', 65'; Guk–hee 76'; Toppo 83' (o.g.); Min–Jeong 84', 89'	Report		Stadium: Buriram City Stadium

21 September 2023 AFC U-17 Q 2R	India	0–4	Thailand	Buriram, Thailand
19:00 UTC+5:30		Report	Rinyaphat 17' (pen.); Julaiporn 19'; Madison 23' (pen.), 71'	Stadium: Buriram City Stadium

23 September 2023 AFC U-17 Q 2R	Iran	0–3	India	Buriram, Thailand
15:00 UTC+5:30			Raul 37', 44', 88'	Stadium: Buriram City Stadium

=== Indian national futsal team ===
==== Friendlies ====
12 August 2023 Friendly	Bahrain	3–0	India	Isa Town, Bahrain
20:30 UTC+5:30	J. Saleh 19'; A. Saleh (??); Al-Sandi (??)	Report		Stadium: Khalifa Sports City Stadium

14 August 2023 Friendly	Bahrain	4–0	India	Isa Town, Bahrain
20:30 UTC+5:30	Mukhallaf 4'; Maula 15'; Ali Myad 38'; Mali 38' (o.g.)	Report		Stadium: Khalifa Sports City Stadium

==== 2024 AFC Futsal Asian Cup qualification ====
7 October 2023 2024 AFAC Q	Tajikistan	6–3	India	Dushanbe, Tajikistan
19:30 UTC+5:30	Umed 2'; Favazai 14', 35'; Muhamadjon 31'	Report	Laltlansanga 6', 14', 17'	Stadium: Dushanbe Indoor Hall

9 October 2023 2024 AFAC Q	India	2–5	Myanmar	Dushanbe, Tajikistan
16:30 UTC+5:30	Roluahpuia 11'; Laltlansanga 39'	Report	T.P. Aung 3'; M.T. Aung 13', 40'; Laltlansanga 19' (o.g.); H.M. Tun 40'	Stadium: Dushanbe Indoor Hall

11 October 2023 2024 AFAC Q	Palestine	6–5	India	Dushanbe, Tajikistan
16:30 UTC+5:30	Harara 3'; Alsamahi 6'; Mohammed 20', 34'; Massriea 23'	Report	Laltlansanga 6', 16'; Mali 14', 16'; Roluahpuia 28'	Stadium: Dushanbe Indoor Hall

== International Competitions ==
=== Group A ===
Pos	Team	Pld	W	D	L	GF	GA	GD	Pts	Qualification	(South Africa) STB	(England) WHAM	(India) ATKMB	(India) BEN
1	(South Africa) Stellenbosch FC	3	2	1	0	6	3	+3	7	Advance to final	—	3–3	—	—
2	(England) West Ham United	3	1	2	0	8	4	+4	5	Advance to third-place playoff	—	—	1–1	4–0
3	(India) Mohun Bagan SG	3	0	2	1	1	3	−2	2	Advance to fifth-place playoff	0–2	—	—	0–0
4	(India) Bengaluru	3	0	1	2	0	5	−5	1	Advance to seventh-place playoff	0–1	—	—	—

Source: RFDL, PL

=== Group B ===
Pos	Team	Pld	W	D	L	GF	GA	GD	Pts	Qualification	(England) WOL	(England) EVE	(India) RFYC	(India) SUD
1	(England) Wolverhampton Wanderers	3	3	0	0	10	0	+10	9	Advance to final	—	—	2–0	4–0
2	(England) Everton	3	2	0	1	3	5	−2	6	Advance to third-place playoff	0–4	—	2–1	—
3	(India) RFYC	3	1	0	2	2	4	−2	3	Advance to fifth-place playoff	—	—	—	—
4	(India) Sudeva Delhi	3	0	0	3	0	6	−6	0	Advance to seventh-place playoff	—	1–0	0–1	—

Source: RFDL, PL

=== Placement matches ===
7th place play-off
Team 1	Score	Team 2
Bengaluru (India)	2–1	(India) Sudeva Delhi

5th place play-off
Team 1	Score	Team 2
Mohun Bagan SG (India)	0–4	(India) RFYC

== AFC competitions ==
=== AFC Champions League ===
==== Group stage ====
Pos	Team	Pld	W	D	L	GF	GA	GD	Pts	Qualification	HIL	NAV	NAS	MUM
1	(Saudi Arabia) Al-Hilal	6	5	1	0	16	2	+14	16	Advance to round of 16	—	1–1	2–1	6–0
2	(Uzbekistan) Navbahor	6	4	1	1	11	6	+5	13	Advance to round of 16	0–2	—	2–1	3–0
3	(Iran) Nassaji Mazandaran	6	2	0	4	7	10	−3	6		0–3	1–3	—	2–0
4	(India) Mumbai City	6	0	0	6	1	17	−16	0		0–2	1–2	0–2	—

Source: AFC
Rules for classification: Tiebreakers

18 September 2023 1	Mumbai City (India)	0–2	(Iran) Nassaji Mazandaran	Pune, Maharashtra
19:30 IST		Report	Hosseini 34'; Azadi 62'	Stadium: Shree Shiv Chhatrapati Sports Complex; Attendance: 1,529; Referee: Shaun Evans (Australia)

3 October 2023 2	Navbahor (Uzbekistan)	3–0	(India) Mumbai City	Namangan, Uzbekistan
19:00 UZT (19:30 IST)	Iskanderov 52'; Yakhshiboev 58'; Yuldoshev (yellow card) 62'; Abdumannopov 88'; Akhmedov (yellow card) 90+6'	Report	Stewart (penalty missed) 43'; Díaz (yellow card) 66'	Stadium: Markaziy Stadium; Attendance: 8,230; Referee: Nazmi Nasaruddin (Malaysia)

23 October 2023 3	Al-Hilal (Saudi Arabia)	6–0	(India) Mumbai City	King Fahd International Stadium, Riyadh
21:00 UTC+3	Mitrović 5', 67', 80'; Milinković-Savić 75'; Al-Breik 82'; Al-Malki 90+5'	Report		Attendance: 10,046; Referee: Muhammad Taqi (Singapore)

6 November 2023 4	Mumbai City (India)	0–2	(Saudi Arabia) Al-Hilal	DY Patil Stadium, Navi Mumbai
19:30 UTC+5:30		Report	Michael 62'; Mitrović 85'	Referee: Adham Makhadmeh (Jordan)

28 November 2023 5	Nassaji Mazandaran (Iran)	2–0	(India) Mumbai City	Tehran, Iran
19:30 IRST (21:30 IST)	Reza Azadi 14'; Nongtdu 32' (o.g.)	Report		Stadium: Azadi Stadium; Attendance: 375; Referee: Hanna Hattab (Syria)

4 December 2023 6	Mumbai City (India)	1–2	(Uzbekistan) Navbahor	Pune, Maharashtra
21:30 IST	El Khayati 15'	Report	Iskanderov 29'; Đokić 45+3'	Stadium: Shree Shiv Chhatrapati Sports Complex; Attendance: 476; Referee: Nazmi Nasaruddin (Malaysia)

=== AFC Cup ===
==== Qualifying play-offs ====
16 August 2023 Preliminary round 2	(India) Mohun Bagan SG	3–1	(Nepal) Machhindra	Kolkata, India
19:00 UTC+5:30	Ali 39', 86'; Cummings 59'	Report	Oloumou 78'	Stadium: Vivekananda Yuba Bharati Krirangan; Attendance: 2,892; Referee: (United Arab Emirates) Ahmed Eisa Mohamed; Man of the Match: Anwar Ali

22 August 2023 Play-off round	(India) Mohun Bagan SG	3–1	(Bangladesh) Dhaka Abahani	Kolkata, India
19:00 UTC+5:30	Cummings 37' (pen.); Soleimani 58' (o.g.); Sadiku 60'	Report	Stewart 17'	Stadium: Vivekananda Yuba Bharati Krirangan; Attendance: 10,625; Referee: Bijan Heydari (Iran); Man of the Match: Jason Cummings

==== Group Stage ====
Pos	Team	Pld	W	D	L	GF	GA	GD	Pts	Qualification
1	(India) Odisha	6	4	0	2	17	12	+5	12	Inter-zone play-off semi-finals
2	(Bangladesh) Bashundhara Kings	6	3	1	2	10	10	0	10	
3	(India) Mohun Bagan SG	6	2	1	3	11	11	0	7	
4	(Maldives) Maziya	6	2	0	4	9	14	−5	6	

Source: AFC
Rules for classification: Group stage tiebreakers

19 September 2023	Odisha (India)	0–4	(India) Mohun Bagan SG	Kalinga Stadium, Bhubaneswar
19:30 UTC+5:30		Report	Sahal 46'; Petratos 68', 82'; Liston 79'	Attendance: 5,218; Referee: Omar Al-Yaqoubi (Oman)

2 October 2023	Mohun Bagan SG (India)	2–1	(Maldives) Maziya	Vivekananda Yuba Bharati Krirangan, Kolkata
19:30 UTC+5:30	Cummings 28', 90+2'	Report	Wada 45'

2 October 2023	Bashundhara Kings (Bangladesh)	3–2	(India) Odisha	Bashundhara Kings Arena, Dhaka
18:00 UTC+6	Figueira 39'; Dori 45', 54'	Report	Maurício 19'; Jerry 66'

24 October 2023	Odisha (India)	6–1	(Maldives) Maziya	Kalinga Stadium, Bhubaneswar
17:30 UTC+5:30	Puitea 3'; Delgado 15'; Fall 19'; Ranawade 58'; Vanlalruatfela 62'; Panwar 90+5'	Report	Jočić 13'	Attendance: 2,218; Referee: Thoriq Alkatiri (Indonesia)

24 October 2023	Mohun Bagan SG (India)	2–2	(Bangladesh) Bashundhara Kings	Kalinga Stadium, Bhubaneswar
21:30 UTC+5:30	Petratos 29'; Rai 54'	Report	Dorielton 33'; Robinho 70' (pen.)	Attendance: 150; Referee: Clifford Postanes Daypuyat (Philippines)

7 November 2023	Bashundhara Kings (Bangladesh)	2–1	(India) Mohun Bagan SG	Bashundhara Kings Arena, Dhaka
20:00 UTC+6	Figueira 44'; Robinho 80'	Report	Liston 17'	Referee: Suhaizi Shukri (Malaysia)

7 November 2023	Maziya (Maldives)	2–3	(India) Odisha	National Football Stadium, Malé
15:00 UTC+5	Hassan 2'; Balabanovic 26'	Report	Fall 65'; Maurício 72'; Krishna 85'	Referee: Mohammad Hasan Mahmoud Arafah (Jordan)

27 November 2023	Mohun Bagan SG (India)	2–5	(India) Odisha	Vivekananda Yuba Bharati Krirangan, Kolkata
19:30 UTC+5:30	Boumous 17'; Nassiri 63'	Report	Krishna 29'; Maurício 32'; Goddard 41'; Jadhav 90+2'; Vanlalruatfela 90+5'	Referee: Gamini Nivon Robesh (Sri Lanka)

11 December 2023	Odisha (India)	1–0	(Bangladesh) Bashundhara Kings	Kalinga Stadium, Bhubaneswar
19:30 UTC+5:30	Fall 61'	Report		Referee: Ngô Duy Lân (Vietnam)

11 December 2023	Maziya (Maldives)	1–0	(India) Mohun Bagan SG	National Football Stadium, Malé
15:00 UTC+5	Raif 40'	Report		Referee: Daiyrbek Abdyldaev (Kyrgyzstan)

==== Knockout stage ====
7 March 2024 Inter-zone semi-finals	Central Coast Mariners (Australia)	4–0	(India) Odisha	Gosford, Australia
19:00 AEDT	Doka 36', 77' (pen.); Roux 52'; Barcellos 89'	Report		Stadium: Central Coast Stadium; Referee: Qasim Al-Hatmi (Oman)

14 March 2024 Inter-zone semi-finals	Odisha (India)	0–0 (0-4 agg.)	(Australia) Central Coast Mariners	Bhubaneswar, India
15:00 IST				Stadium: Kalinga Stadium

=== AFC Women's Club Championship ===
==== Group stage ====
Pos	Team	Pld	W	D	L	GF	GA	GD	Pts	Qualification
1	(Japan) Urawa Red Diamonds	3	3	0	0	20	1	+19	9	Advance to final
2	(India) Gokulam Kerala FC	3	1	1	1	5	12	−7	4	
3	(Thailand) Bangkok FC (H)	3	1	0	2	6	10	−4	3	
4	(Chinese Taipei) Hualien	3	0	1	2	1	9	−8	1	

Source: AFC
(H) Hosts

6 November 2023 1	Urawa Red Diamonds (Japan)	8–0	(India) Gokulam Kerala FC	Chonburi Stadium, Chonburi
16:30 UTC+7	Shibata 2'; Kurishima 16'; Shimada 38'; Ito 48', 82'; Nishio 83'; Seike 87'; Ando 90+2'	Report		Attendance: 100; Referee: Yu Hong (China)

9 November 2023 2	Gokulam Kerala FC (India)	1–1	(Chinese Taipei) Hualien	Chonburi Stadium, Chonburi
16:30 UTC+7	Kumari 19'		Lin Jing-Xuan 42'

12 November 2023 3	Bangkok FC (Thailand)	3–4	(India) Gokulam Kerala FC	Chonburi Stadium, Chonburi
20:30 UTC+7	Ploychompoo 26'; Kanyanat 45+1', 49'		Dabbaghi 45'; Appiah 47', 77', 80'

== League Competitions (Men's) ==
League	Promoted to league ▲	Relegated from league ▼
Indian Super League	Punjab ▲	
I-League	Delhi FC ▲; Shillong Lajong ▲	Mumbai Kenkre ▼; Sudeva Delhi ▼
I-League 2	Sporting Goa ▲; Dempo ▲; Sporting Bengaluru ▲	
I-League 3	25 clubs ▲	

=== Indian Super League ===
==== Regular season ====
Pos	Team	Pld	W	D	L	GF	GA	GD	Pts	Qualification
1	Mohun Bagan (C)	22	15	3	4	47	26	+21	48	Qualification for the Champions League Two group stage and semi-finals
2	Mumbai City (W)	22	14	5	3	42	19	+23	47	Qualification for the semi-finals
3	Goa	22	13	6	3	39	21	+18	45	Qualification for the knockouts
4	Odisha	22	11	6	5	35	23	+12	39	Qualification for the knockouts
5	Kerala Blasters	22	10	3	9	32	31	+1	33	Qualification for the knockouts
6	Chennaiyin	22	8	3	11	26	36	−10	27	Qualification for the knockouts
7	NorthEast United	22	6	8	8	28	32	−4	26	
8	Punjab	22	6	6	10	28	35	−7	24 (Note: Head-to-head points: Punjab 4, East Bengal 1.)	
9	East Bengal	22	6	6	10	27	29	−2	24	Qualification for the Champions League Two preliminary stage (Note: East Bengal qualified for the AFC Champions League Two preliminary stage by winning the 2024 Super Cup.)
10	Bengaluru	22	5	7	10	20	34	−14	22	
11	Jamshedpur	22	5	6	11	27	32	−5	21	
12	Hyderabad	22	1	5	16	10	43	−33	8	

Source: Indian Super League
Rules for classification: 1) points; 2) head-to-head points; 3) head-to-head goal difference; 4) head-to-head goals scored; 5) goal difference; 6) number of goals scored; 7) fair play ranking
(C) Champions; (W) ISL Cup winners

==== Playoffs ====
Knockout
4	Odisha (a.e.t.)	2
5	Kerala	1
3	Goa	2
6	Chennaiyin	1

Semifinals
1	Mohun Bagan SG	1	2	3
4	Odisha	2	0	2
2	Mumbai City	3	2	5
3	Goa	2	0	2

Finals
1	Mohun Bagan SG	1
2	Mumbai City	3

==== Final ====
4 May 2024
19:30 IST

Mohun Bagan SG	1–3	Mumbai City
Cummings 44'	Report	Pereyra Díaz 53'; Bipin 81'; Vojtuš 90+7'

Vivekananda Yuba Bharati Krirangan, Kolkata
Attendance: 62,007
Referee: Venkatesh R

=== I-League ===
Pos	Team	Pld	W	D	L	GF	GA	GD	Pts	Qualification
1	Mohammedan (C, P)	24	15	7	2	44	22	+22	52	Promotion to Indian Super League
2	Sreenidi Deccan	24	14	6	4	54	26	+28	48	
3	Gokulam Kerala	24	12	6	6	55	34	+21	42	
4	Inter Kashi	24	11	8	5	47	41	+6	41	
5	Real Kashmir	24	11	7	6	36	19	+17	40	
6	Delhi	24	11	2	11	44	40	+4	35	
7	Churchill Brothers	24	9	6	9	40	31	+9	33	
8	Shillong Lajong	24	8	7	9	36	37	−1	31	
9	Namdhari	24	7	6	11	29	40	−11	27	
10	Aizawl	22	6	7	9	36	35	+1	25	
11	Rajasthan United	24	6	7	11	40	63	−23	25	
12	NEROCA (R)	23	4	2	17	26	61	−35	14	Relegation to I-League 2
13	TRAU (R)	23	4	1	18	26	64	−38	13	Relegation to I-League 2

Source: I-League
Rules for classification: 1) Points; 2) Head-to-head points; 3) Head-to-head goal difference; 4) Total goal difference; 5) Total number of goals scored; 6) drawing of lots
(Note: Head-to-head record is used only after all the matches between the teams in question have been played).
(C) Champions; (P) Promoted; (R) Relegated

=== I-League 2 ===
Pos	Team	Pld	W	D	L	GF	GA	GD	Pts	Qualification
1	Sporting Bengaluru (C)	14	11	0	3	28	12	+16	33	Promotion to I-League
2	Dempo	14	8	3	3	21	13	+8	27	Promotion to I-League
3	Sudeva Delhi	14	7	2	5	17	19	−2	23	
4	Bengaluru United	14	6	2	6	21	19	+2	20	
5	Sporting Goa	14	6	1	7	19	18	+1	19	
6	United	14	4	3	7	18	21	−3	15	
7	Maharashtra Oranje	14	4	3	7	20	25	−5	15	Relegation to I-League 3
8	Kenkre	14	3	0	11	17	34	−17	9	Relegation to I-League 3

Source: I-League 2 AIFF
Rules for classification: 1) points; 2) head-to-head points; 3) head-to-head goal difference; 4) head-to-head goals scored; 5) goal difference; 6) number of goals scored; 7) fair play ranking; 8) drawing of lots
(C) Champions

=== I-League 3 ===
==== Play-offs ====
Pos	Team	Pld	W	D	L	GF	GA	GD	Pts	Promotion	SPG	DEM	SCB	KUN	KLA
1	Sporting Goa (C, H)	4	2	1	1	4	3	+1	7	Promoted to I-League 2		1–0	1–0		
2	Dempo (H)	4	2	1	1	6	2	+4	7	Promoted to I-League 2			1–1	1–0	4–0
3	Sporting Bengaluru	4	2	1	1	6	5	+1	7	Promoted to I-League 2				2–1	
4	Kerala United	4	2	0	2	5	5	0	6		2–1				2–1
5	KLASA	4	0	1	3	4	10	−6	1		1–1		2–3		

Updated to match(es) played on 30 December 2023. Source:
(C) Champions; (H) Hosts

=== State football leagues ===
Zone	State	League	Teams	League dates	Duration (months)	Champions	Runners-up	I-League 3 qualification
North	Delhi	Delhi Premier League	11	16 Nov 2023–19 Feb 2024	3	Garhwal Heroes	Royal Rangers	Garhwal Heroes
North	Punjab	Punjab State Super Football League	15	14 Aug–10 Dec 2023	4	Namdhari FC	Young FC	Dalbir FA
North	Haryana	Haryana Men’s Football League	8	10 May–5 June 2024	1	Bhuna	Heroes United	Bhuna
North-East
North-East	Manipur	Manipur Premier League	9	13 Dec 2023–29 Jan 2024	1	Southern SU	-	Southern SU
North-East	Manipur	Manipur Premier League	9	13 Dec 2023–29 Jan 2024	1	Asufii FA	-	Southern SU
North-East	Manipur	Manipur State League	15	7 Apr–22 May 2024	1.5	NISA	Liwachangning YCC	-
North-East	Mizoram	Mizoram Premier League	8	25 Aug–22 Dec 2023	4	Mizoram Police	Chanmari	Chanmari
North-East	Sikkim	Sikkim Premier Division League	8	3 Feb–4 Mar 2024	1	Singling SC	Thunderbolt North United	-
North-East	Assam	Assam State Premier League	8	01 Nov 2023–8 Jan 2024	2	Karbi Anglong Morning Star	United Chirang Duar	Karbi Anglong Morning Star
East
East	Odisha	2023 FAO League	8	5 July–30 Aug 2023	2	Sunrise Club	Sports Odisha	Sports Odisha
East	West Bengal (Kolkata)	2023 CFL Premier Division	26	25 June–30 Nov 2023	5	Mohammedan	East Bengal B	Diamond Harbour
East	Chhattisgarh	2024 Chhattisgarh Football League	7	18 April–6 June 2024	2	RKM	Brahmavid FA	RKM
West	Goa	2023–24 Goa Professional League	13	27 Aug 2023–1 May 2024	8	Sporting Goa	SESA	SESA
West	Gujarat	Gujarat SFA Club Championship	9	19 Nov 2023–31 Mar 2024	4	Charutar Vidya Mandal	Baroda FA	Charutar Vidya Mandal
West	Madhya Pradesh	Madhya Pradesh Premier League	6	10 Dec 2023–17 Jan 2024	1	Lake City	The Diamond Rock	Lake City
West	Maharashtra (Mumbai)	2023–24 Mumbai Premier League	16	30 Oct 2023–7 May 2024	6	MYJ–GMSC	Maharashtra Oranje	MYJ-GMSC
West	Rajasthan	2023-24 R-League A Division	9	8 Mar 2024–28 May 2024	2	Jaipur Elite	Brothers United	Jaipur Elite
South	Karnataka (Bengaluru)	2023–24 Bangalore Super Division	19	15 Aug–22 Nov 2023	3	Bengaluru B	Sporting Bengaluru	HAL SC
South	Kerala	2023–24 Kerala Premier League	20	25 Nov 2023–11 Feb 2024	2.5	Kerala United	SAT	SAT

=== Charity Football Match for Cyclone Victims ===
The Mizoram Football Association in collaboration with Mizo Professional Footballers Association held a charity football match on June 21, 202. This match featured ISL vs I-League players from Mizoram to raise funds for Cyclone Remal victims.

21 June 2024
17:00 IST

ISL XI (Mizo)	2-2	I-League XI (Mizo)
	Report

Rajiv Gandhi Stadium, Aizawl

== Cup competitions (Men's) ==
=== Super Cup ===
Semifinals
A1	East Bengal	2
B1	Jamshedpur	0
C1	Mumbai City	0
D1	Odisha	1

Final
SFW1	East Bengal (a.e.t.)	3
SFW2	Odisha	2

==== Final ====
28 January 2024
19:30 IST
Final

East Bengal	3–2 (a.e.t.)	Odisha
Sekar 51'; Crespo 62' (pen.); Silva 111'	Report	Maurício 39'; Jahouh 90+9' (pen.)

Kalinga Stadium, Bhubaneswar
Attendance: 10,121
Referee: Venkatesh R.

=== Durand Cup ===
Quarter-finals
24 August – Guwahati
Indian Army	0
NorthEast United	1
25 August – Kolkata
East Bengal	2
Gokulam Kerala	1
26 August – Guwahati
Goa	4
Chennaiyin	1
27 August – Kolkata
Mumbai City	1
Mohun Bagan	3

Semi-finals
29 August – Kolkata
NorthEast United	2(3)
East Bengal	2(5)
31 August – Kolkata
Goa	1
Mohun Bagan	2

Final
3 September – Kolkata
East Bengal	0
Mohun Bagan	1

==== Final ====
3 September 2023
16:00 IST

East Bengal	0–1	Mohun Bagan
	Report	Dimitri Petratos 71'

Vivekananda Yuba Bharati Krirangan, Kolkata
Attendance: 55,423
Referee: Rahul Kumar Gupta

== League Competitions (Women's) ==
=== Indian Women's League ===
Pos	Team	Pld	W	D	L	GF	GA	GD	Pts	Qualification
1	Odisha (C)	12	10	1	1	31	4	+27	31	Qualification for the Champions League preliminary stage
2	Gokulam Kerala	12	9	2	1	33	5	+28	29	
3	Kickstart	12	6	3	3	16	18	−2	21	
4	Sethu	12	5	2	5	16	14	+2	17	
5	HOPS	12	5	1	6	15	19	−4	16	
6	East Bengal	12	1	1	10	8	31	−23	4	
7	Sports Odisha	12	0	2	10	3	31	−28	2	

Source: AIFF
Rules for classification: 1) points; 2) head-to-head points; 3) head-to-head goal difference; 4) goal difference; 5) number of goals scored; 6) drawing of lots
(C) Champions

=== Indian Women's League 2 ===
==== Final round ====
Pos	Team	Pld	W	D	L	GF	GA	GD	Pts	Qualification
1	Sreebhumi	5	3	1	1	13	5	+8	10	Promotion to Indian Women's League
2	Nita	5	3	1	1	15	7	+8	10	Promotion to Indian Women's League
3	Garhwal United	5	3	0	2	15	6	+9	9	
4	Pudhuvai Unicorns	5	2	1	2	7	5	+2	7	
5	Tuem (H)	5	1	3	1	5	4	+1	6	
6	SAG	5	0	0	5	2	30	−28	0	

Source: I-League
Rules for classification: 1) points; 2) head-to-head points; 3) head-to-head goal difference; 4) goal difference; 5) number of goals scored; 6) drawing of lots
(H) Hosts

== Men's club futsal ==
=== Futsal Club Championship ===
Quarter-finals
3 July
Corbett FC	11
Delhi FC	1
3 July
Minerva Academy FC	2
Ambelim SC	8
3 July
FC Thyrstior	6
Electric Veng FC	3
3 July
Golazo FC	8
Millat FC	0

Semi-finals
3 July
Corbett FC	6
Ambelim SC	5
3 July
FC Thyrstior	3
Golazo FC	5

Final
3 July
Corbett FC	3
Golazo FC	2

==== Final ====
7 July 2024
17:00 IST

Corbett FC	3–2	Golazo FC
Lalbiakzuala 9'; Pc Lalruatsanga 37', 50'	Report	Stephen Satarkar 13'; Jayesh Sutar 37'

Swarnim Gujarat Sports University

== Youth football ==
=== Elite League ===
Quarterfinals
A1	Sudeva Delhi FC	3
D2	Chennayin FC	1
C1	Zinc Football Academy	1
B2	Corbett FC	2
B1	Kerala Blasters FC	0
C2	Football 4 Change Academy	2
D2	Classic Football Academy	1
A1	Punjab FC	0

Semifinals
A1	Sudeva Delhi FC	4
B2	Corbett FC	0
C2	Football 4 Change Academy	0
D1	Classic Football Academy	2

Finals
A1	Sudeva Delhi FC	1
D1	Classic Football Academy	2

==== Final ====
25 May 2024
16:00 IST
Final

Sudeva Delhi FC	1-2	Classic Football Academy
Gaurav 60'	Report	Samson 56'; Rishi Singh 49'

Nagoa Panchayat Ground, Nagoa, Goa
Attendance: 150
Referee: Ritesh Rajaram Parsekar

=== Reliance Foundation Development League ===
All matches to be played at Reliance Corporate Park Football Ground, Ghansoli, Navi Mumbai.

Semifinals
A1	Bengaluru	0 (2)
D1	Punjab (p)	0 (4)
C1	East Bengal (p)	3 (4)
B1	Muthoot FA	3 (3)

Final
D1	Punjab	3
C1	East Bengal	2
Third place
A1	Bengaluru	2 (4)
B1	Muthoot FA (p)	2 (5)

==== Final ====
18 May 2024
14:00 IST

East Bengal	2–3	Punjab
Guite 41'; Joseph 50'		Omang 10'; Yendrembam 60'; Harmanpreet 73'

Reliance Corporate Park Football Ground, Ghansoli, Navi Mumbai

== See also ==
- Football in India
