= 2023–24 I-League 3 =

1st season of the I-League 3

I-League 3
- Season: 2023–24
- Dates: 9 November – 30 December 2023
- Champions: Sporting Goa
- Promoted: Sporting Goa; Dempo; Sporting Bengaluru
- Relegated: 20 clubs
- Matches: 60
- Goals: 182 (3.03 per match)
- Top goalscorer: (India) Arif Shaikh (5 goals)
- Biggest win: Sporting Goa 10–0 New Friends Club (13 November)
- Highest scoring: Sporting Goa 10–0 New Friends Club (13 November)
- Total attendance: 18,580
- Average attendance: 309

The 2023–24 I-League 3 was the 1st season of the I-League 3, and the national fourth tier of the Indian football league system. The top three clubs qualified for 2023–24 I-League 2.

== Over view ==
The AIFF was launched National Football Division -3 for the first time in the 2006-2007 season. The NFL3 was folded after first season. After 17 years, the AIFF reintroduced this league as I-League 3. The inaugural season 25 clubs were participated in 5 group of 5 team in each group. 5 group champions were promoted to final round. 3 top teams from the final round were promoted to Ileague-2. Sporting Goa, Dempo Sc, Sporting Club Bengaluru were promoted to 2023-24 I-League 2. Bottom 2 teams from final round Kerala United and KLASA were reinstated 2024-25 I-League 3 group stage.

== Clubs ==
On 22 August 2023, 15 clubs were nominated for the I-League 3rd Division by nine state FAs (Chhattisgarh, Delhi, Goa, Gujarat, Bengaluru, Madhya Pradesh, Punjab, Rajasthan, and Mumbai). Nominations from 10 other states (Manipur, Dadra and Nagar Haveli and Daman and Diu, Kerala, Pondicherry, Sikkim, Assam, Odisha, Telangana, and West Bengal) were assessed after due diligence.

Locations of 2023-24 I-League 3 Group stage clubs

Group A Group B Group C Group D

Group E

No.	Club	City	State	League	Position
1	RKM	Narayanpur	Chhattisgarh	2023 Chhattisgarh State Men's Football League Championship	1st
2	New Friends	Bade Bacheli	Chhattisgarh	2023 Chhattisgarh State Men's Football League Championship	2nd
3	Vatika	New Delhi	Delhi	2022–23 Delhi Premier League	1st
4	Garhwal	New Delhi	Delhi	2022–23 Delhi Premier League	3rd
5	Dempo	Panaji	Goa	2022–23 Goa Professional League	1st
6	Sporting Goa	Panaji	Goa	2022–23 Goa Professional League	2nd
7	Baroda	Vadodara	Gujarat	2022–23 Gujarat SFA Club Championship	1st
8	ARA	Ahemedabad	Gujarat	2022–23 Gujarat SFA Club Championship	2nd
9	Sporting Bengaluru	Bengaluru	Karnataka	2022–23 Bangalore Super Division	1st
10	Kickstart	Bengaluru	Karnataka	2022–23 Bangalore Super Division	3rd
11	Lake City	Bhopal	Madhya Pradesh	2022–23 Madhya Pradesh Premier League	1st
12	International	Phagwara	Punjab	2022 Punjab State Super Football League	3rd
13	Doaba United	Jalandhar	Punjab	2022 Punjab State Super Football League	4th
14	Jaipur Elite	Jaipur	Rajasthan	2022 R-League A Division	1st
15	Millat	Mumbai	Maharashtra	2022–23 MFA Elite Division	3rd
16	Bhawanipore	Kolkata	West Bengal	2022 Calcutta Premier Division	2nd
17	Diamond Harbour	Diamond Harbour	West Bengal	2022 Calcutta First Division	3rd
18	Kerala United	Malappuram	Kerala	2022–23 Kerala Premier League	Champions (Note: The club qualified via a cup or knock-out tournament after the conclusion of the league stage)
19	Rangdajied United	Shillong	Meghalaya	2022-23 Meghalaya State League	1st
20	KLASA	Bishnupur	Manipur	2022 Manipur State League	Champions
21	KIYC	Imphal	Manipur	2022 Manipur State League	Semifinalist
22	United Chirang Duar	Chirang	Assam	2023 ATPA Shield	Champions (Note: No state or district league conducted.)
23	Sports Odisha	Cuttack	Odisha	2023 FAO Super Cup	Champions
24	Abbas Union	Hyderabad	Telangana	Rahim League “A” Division	-
25	Jeppiaar Institute of Technology	Pondicherry	Pondicherry	Pondicherry Men's League Championship	-

== Venues ==
Group	City	Stadium	Capacity
A	Bhopal	Jagran Lakecity University Stadium	1,800
B	Vadodra	VMC Sports Complex	3,500
C	Panjim	Dempo Academy Ground	500
D	Bangalore	Bangalore Football Stadium	8,400
D	Bangalore	HAL Sports Club Ground	2,000
E	Narainpur	Ramakrishna Mission Sports Complex	1,000
Playoffs	Vasco	Tilak Maidan	5,000
Playoffs	Nagoa	Nagoa Ground	1,000

== Changes from last season ==
Until the previous season, the AIFF allowed only state champions to feature in the qualifiers, but with the removal of the ISL reserve teams and the creation of the I-League 3 from where teams would move to I-League 2 in the same season, state FAs were allowed to nominate a second team.

== Group stage ==
25 teams are divided into five groups of five each. Each team will play the teams in the same group in single-legged fixtures.

=== Group A ===
Pos	Team	Pld	W	D	L	GF	GA	GD	Pts	Qualification	SPG	LKC	INT	ARA	NFC
1	Sporting Goa	4	3	1	0	13	0	+13	10	Advanced to Play-offs				2–0	
2	Lake City (H)	4	2	2	0	10	4	+6	8	Relegated to State leagues	0–0				7–2
3	International	4	2	0	2	5	3	+2	6	Relegated to State leagues	0–1	1–2			
4	ARA	4	1	1	2	7	4	+3	4	Relegated to State leagues		1–1	0–1		
5	New Friends	4	0	0	4	2	26	−24	0	Relegated to State leagues	0–10		0–3	0–6	

Source: i-league.org The Away End
(H) Hosts

=== Group B ===
Pos	Team	Pld	W	D	L	GF	GA	GD	Pts	Qualification	KLA	ODI	CHD	BAR	JPE
1	KLASA	4	3	1	0	4	1	+3	10	Advanced to Play-offs			2–1		
2	Sports Odisha	4	2	1	1	6	3	+3	7	Relegated to State leagues	0–1		1–1		3–1
3	United Chirang Duar	4	1	2	1	5	5	0	5	Relegated to State leagues				2–1	1–1
4	Baroda (H)	4	1	0	3	3	5	−2	3	Relegated to State leagues	0–1	0–2			
5	Jaipur Elite	4	0	2	2	2	6	−4	2	Relegated to State leagues	0–0			0–2	

Source: i-league.org The Away End
(H) Hosts

=== Group C ===
Pos	Team	Pld	W	D	L	GF	GA	GD	Pts	Qualification	DEM	RGD	KST	JIT	MIL
1	Dempo (H)	4	3	1	0	5	0	+5	10	Advanced to Play-offs			2–0	2–0	
2	Rangdajied United	4	2	2	0	8	2	+6	8	Relegated to State leagues	0–0				5–0
3	Kickstart	4	2	1	1	15	4	+11	7	Relegated to State leagues		2–2		7–0	6–0
4	JIT	4	1	0	3	2	11	−9	3	Relegated to State leagues		0–1			
5	Millat	4	0	0	4	1	14	−13	0	Relegated to State leagues	0–1			1–2	

Source: i-league.org The Away End
(H) Hosts

=== Group D ===
Pos	Team	Pld	W	D	L	GF	GA	GD	Pts	Qualification	SCB	DHB	VAT	DUN	ABU
1	Sporting Bengaluru (H)	4	3	1	0	13	3	+10	10	Advanced to Play-offs				6–0	3–1
2	Diamond Harbour	4	3	1	0	8	2	+6	10	Relegated to State leagues	2–2		3–0		
3	Vatika	4	2	0	2	5	7	−2	6	Relegated to State leagues	0–2				3–2
4	Doaba United	4	1	0	3	3	11	−8	3	Relegated to State leagues		0–2	0–2		3–1
5	Abbas Union	4	0	0	4	4	10	−6	0	Relegated to State leagues		0–1			

Source: i-league.org The Away End
(H) Hosts

=== Group E ===
Pos	Team	Pld	W	D	L	GF	GA	GD	Pts	Qualification	KUN	BHW	GRH	KYC	RKM
1	Kerala United	4	2	2	0	10	6	+4	8	Advanced to Play-offs			3–0		2–1
2	Bhawanipore	4	2	1	1	8	6	+2	7	Relegated to State leagues	3–3		0–1	2–1	
3	Garhwal	4	2	0	2	5	8	−3	6	Relegated to State leagues				1–4	
4	KIYC	4	1	1	2	8	7	+1	4	Relegated to State leagues	2–2				1–2
5	RKM (H)	4	1	0	3	5	9	−4	3	Relegated to State leagues		1–3	1–3		

Source: i-league.org The Away End
(H) Hosts

== Play-offs ==
Pos	Team	Pld	W	D	L	GF	GA	GD	Pts	Promotion	SPG	DEM	SCB	KUN	KLA
1	Sporting Goa (C, H)	4	2	1	1	4	3	+1	7	Promoted to I-League 2		1–0	1–0		
2	Dempo (H)	4	2	1	1	6	2	+4	7	Promoted to I-League 2			1–1	1–0	4–0
3	Sporting Bengaluru	4	2	1	1	6	5	+1	7	Promoted to I-League 2				2–1	
4	Kerala United	4	2	0	2	5	5	0	6		2–1				2–1
5	KLASA	4	0	1	3	4	10	−6	1		1–1		2–3		

Updated to match(es) played on 30 December 2023. Source:
(C) Champions; (H) Hosts

== Broadcast ==
Matches are broadcast by AIFF, SportsKPI and SportsCast India on their official YouTube channels.

== Statistics ==
30 December 2023

=== Top scorers ===
Bold indicates the player is currently active in the tournament.

Rank	Player	Club	Goals
1	(India) Arif Shaikh	Sporting Bengaluru	5
2	(India) Khanngam Horam	Kickstart	4
2	(India) Bijoy ghosh	KIYC	4
2	(India) Lloyd Cardozo	Sporting Goa	4
5	14 Players		3

=== Clean sheets ===
Rank	Player	Club	Clean sheets
1	(India) Bhaskar Jalmi	Sporting Goa	6
2	(India) Wellyster Mendes	Dempo	4
3	(India) Golmei Rongmei	KLASA	3
3	(India) Susnata Malik	Diamond Harbour	3
5	(India) Dylan D'Silva	Dempo	2
5	(India) Banshanskhem Kharsyntiew	Rangdajied United	2
5	(India) Kabir Toufik	Kickstart	2

=== Discipline ===
==== Player ====
- Most yellow cards: **4**
  - (India) Dhiraj Chouhan
- Most red cards: **1**
  - 6 players

==== Club ====
- Most yellow cards: **18**
  - Sporting Bengaluru
- Most red cards: **2**
  - Kerala United

== Attendances ==
=== Group Stage ===
Match No.	Group A		Match No.	Group B		Match No.	Group C	
Match No.	Fixture	Attendance	Match No.	Fixture	Attendance	Match No.	Fixture	Attendance
1	Lake City-Sporting Goa	200	1	Baroda-KLASA	350	1	Dempo-JIT	100
2	ARA-International	50	2	United Chirang Duar-Jaipur Elite	175	2	Rangdajied United-Millat	100
3	New Friends-ARA	20	3	Sports Odisha-United Chirang Duar	75	3	Kickstart-Rangdajied United	100
4	International-Sporting Goa	20	4	Jaipur Elite-KLASA	375	4	Millat-JIT	50
5	International-Lake City	10	5	Jaipur Elite-Baroda	250	5	Millat-Dempo	100
6	New Friends-Sporting Goa	10	6	Sports Odisha-KLASA	180	6	Kickstart-JIT	50
7	Sporting Goa-ARA	10	7	KLASA-United Chirang Duar	280	7	JIT-Rangdajied United	50
8	Lake City-New Friends	10	8	Baroda-Sports Odisha	315	8	Dempo-Kickstart	100
9	New Friends-International	10	9	Sports Odisha-Jaipur Elite	45	9	Kickstart-Millat	50
10	ARA -Lake City	20	10	United Chirang Duar-Baroda	65	10	Rangdajied United-Dempo	100
Group A Total		360	Group B Total		2,110	Group C Total		800
Match No.	Group D		Match No.	Group E				
Match No.	Fixture	Attendance	Match No.	Fixture	Attendance			
1	Diamond Harbour-Vatika	120	1	RKM-Garhwal	3,100			
2	Sporting Bengaluru-Abbas Union	180	2	KIYC-Kerala United	1,600			
3	Doaba United-Diamond Harbour	75	3	Garhwal-KIYC	800			
4	Vatika-Abbas Union	250	4	RKM-Bhawanipore	2,100			
5	Doaba United-Abbas Union	250	5	Kerala United-RKM	1,100			
6	Vatika-Sporting Bengaluru	50	6	Bhawanipore-Garhwal	800			
7	Abbas Union-Diamond Harbour	75	7	Bhawanipore-KIYC	400			
8	Sporting Bengaluru-Doaba United	50	8	Kerala United-Garhwal	500			
9	Doaba United-Vatika	60	9	Bhawanipore-Kerala United	800			
10	Diamond Harbour-Sporting Bengaluru	150	10	KIYC-RKM	1,100			
Group D Total		1,260	Group E Total		12,300			

=== Playoffs ===
Match No.	Playoffs	
Match No.	Fixture	Attendance
1	Sporting Goa-Sporting Bengaluru	50
2	Kerala United-KLASA	150
3	Dempo-Kerala United	150
4	KLASA-Sporting Bengaluru	250
5	KLASA-Sporting Goa	100
6	Dempo-Sporting Bengaluru	250
7	Sporting Bengaluru-Kerala United	50
8	Sporting Goa-Dempo	250
9	Dempo-KLASA	250
10	Kerala United-Sporting Goa	250
Total		1,750

Source: I-League

== See also ==
- **Men**
  - 2023–24 Indian Super League (Tier I)
  - 2023–24 I-League (Tier II)
  - 2023–24 I-League 2 (Tier III)
  - 2023–24 Indian State Leagues (Tier V)
  - 2023 Durand Cup
  - 2024 Super Cup
  - 2024 Reliance Foundation Development League
- **Women**
  - 2023–24 Indian Women's League
  - 2023–24 Indian Women's League 2
