= Kishan Singh Chongtham =

Indian footballer (born 1998)

Kishan Singh
Personal information
- Full name: Kishan Singh Chongtham
- Date of birth: 10 June 1998 (age 28)
- Place of birth: Matai, Manipur, India
- Position: Midfielder

Team information
- Current team: SC Bengaluru
- Number: 6

Senior career*
Years	Team	Apps	(Gls)
2016–2017	NEROCA	10	(0)
2018–2023	TRAU	47	(1)
2023	KLASA	8	(1)
2023–	SC Bengaluru	18	(2)
- * Club domestic league appearances and goals as of 21:33, 13 December 2024 (UTC)

Kishan Singh Chongtham (Meitei: Chongtham Kishan Singh, born 10 June 1998) is an Indian professional footballer who plays as a midfielder for the I-League club SC Bengaluru.

== Club career ==
On 1 January 2018, Kishan joined then I-League 2nd Division club TRAU. On 12 March 2022, he scored his first goal for the club against Churchill Brothers, in a 2–0 win.

== Career statistics ==
=== Club ===
As of 13 December 2024

Club	Season	League			Cup		AFC		Total	
Club	Season	Division	Apps	Goals	Apps	Goals	Apps	Goals	Apps	Goals
NEROCA	2015–16	I-League 2nd Division	8	0	0	0	—		8	0
NEROCA	2016–17	I-League 2nd Division	2	0	0	0	—		2	0
NEROCA	Total		10	0	0	0	0	0	10	0
TRAU	2017–18	I-League 2nd Division	5	0	0	0	—		5	0
TRAU	2020–21	I-League	12	0	0	0	—		12	0
TRAU	2021–22	I-League	14	1	0	0	—		14	1
TRAU	2022–23	I-League	16	0	3 (Note: Appearance(s) in Durand Cup)	0	—		19	0
TRAU	Total		47	1	3	0	0	0	50	1
KLASA	2023–24	I-League 3	8	1	0	0	—		8	1
SC Bengaluru	2023–24	I-League 2	13	2	0	0	—		13	2
SC Bengaluru	2024–25	I-League	5	0	0	0	—		5	0
SC Bengaluru	Total		18	2	0	0	0	0	18	2
Career total			73	4	3	0	0	0	76	4
