= Bangalore Football Stadium =

Football stadium in Bengaluru, India

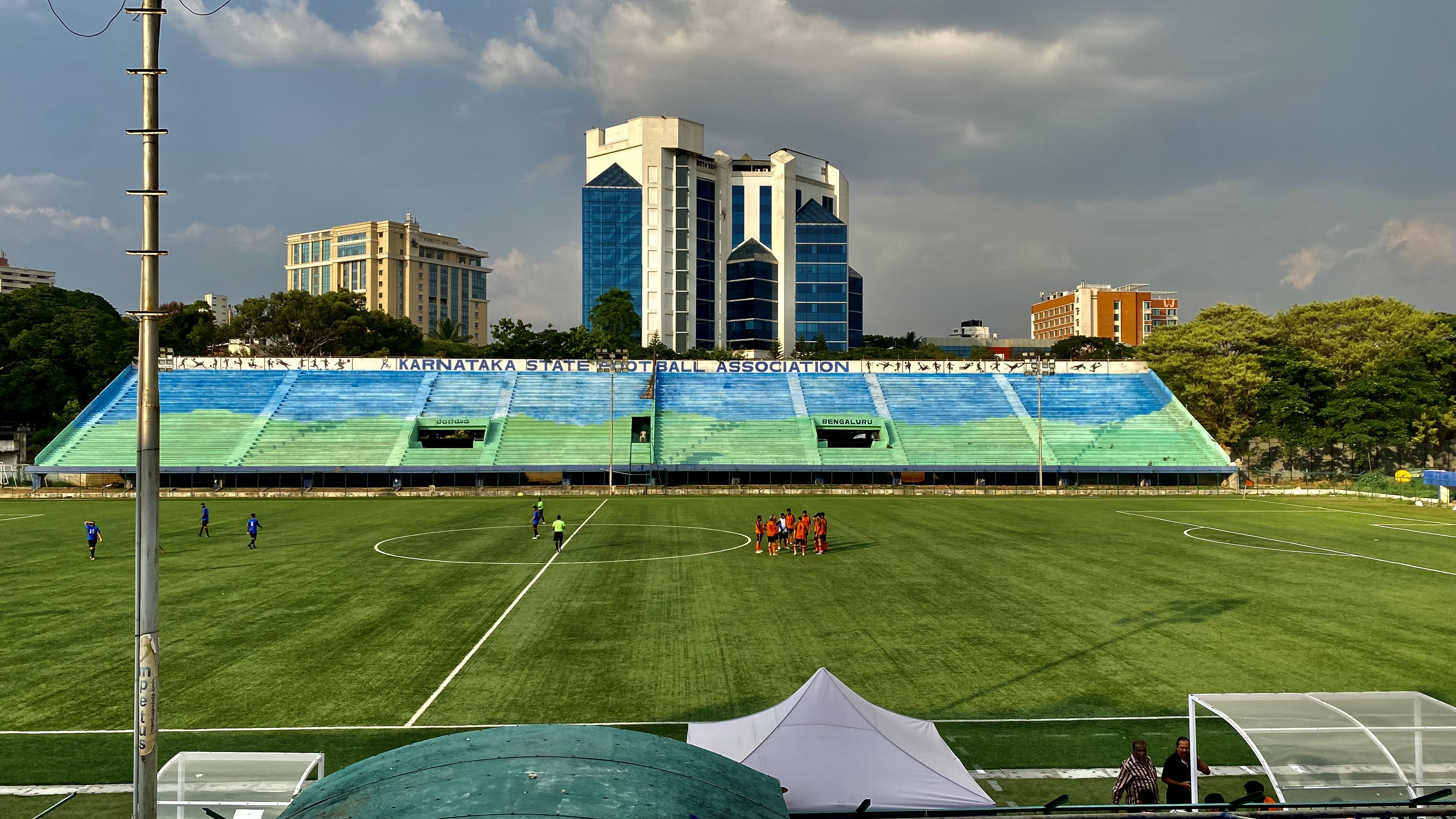
- Stadium on a matchday
- Interactive map of Bangalore Football Stadium
- Location: Magrath Road, Bengaluru, Karnataka
- Coordinates: 12°58′08″N 77°36′42″E
- Owner: Karnataka State Football Association
- Capacity: 15,000 to 40,000 (1969–2013); 8,400 (2013–)
- Surface: Artificial turf
- Public transit: Purple at MG Road

Construction
- Groundbreaking: 1967
- Opened: 1970–1971

Tenants
- Bengaluru FC B; Bengaluru United; Sporting Bengaluru; Karnataka football team; Bangalore Football League; Karnataka Women's League

The Bangalore Football Stadium is a football stadium in Bengaluru, Karnataka. It has served as a venue in three editions of the I-League, then top-tier football league in the country. The stadium was the home of Bengaluru FC for one season, when they won the I-League trophy in their first attempt. Now the stadium is currently used by FC Bengaluru United for Indian Football League home matches which also hosted I-League 2 matches for SC Bengaluru.

== History ==
=== Construction and early history ===
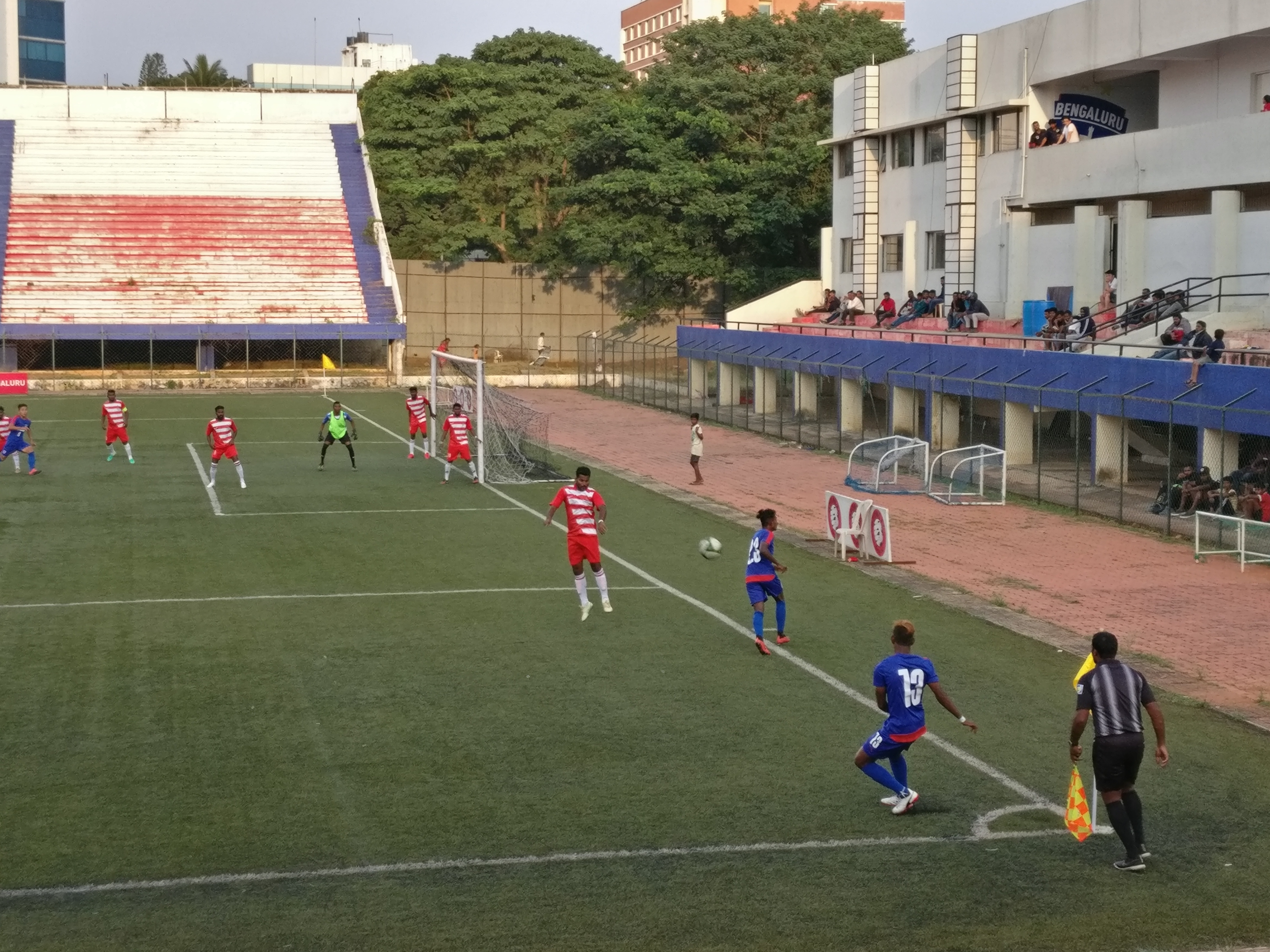
The stadium during a Bangalore Super Division match between Bengaluru FC and CIL in 2013.

Construction of the stadium began in 1967. Initially the stadium was going to be based on the famed Estádio do Maracanã in Brazil which had a capacity of 250,000 back then. The idea was to design and construct the Bengaluru Football Stadium like that but with a final capacity of 90,000 instead. After the first stands were completed around 1970 and 1971 then FIFA president João Havelange made the trip to Bengaluru to see the progress and start of the construction of the main stands. He was left happy with what he heard about the stadium and reportedly said he would bring South American teams to India to play in the stadium.

However, eventually, problems started to arise about the cost of constructing the stadium skyrocketed. Materials such as steel and cement were stolen and due to the rise of costs the state football federation, the Karnataka State Football Association (KSFA), were left without the needed funds to complete the stadium. Even though an enquiry was started, the results were never published due to corruption within the Bengaluru system.

In order to raise some funds a leasing agreement was made with a private builder for two corner areas for his own buildings. The lease was revealed to be an 88-year agreement for 1 crore a year being given to the KSFA. Despite the agreement, the delay in construction meant one of the stands had to be re-constructed while slum dwellers moved into the area where the southern stand would be. This led to problems with fans and players who found it tough to retrieve the ball from the area once it landed there.

In 1996–97, in an effort to have the National Games of India hosted in Bengaluru the high court ordered the slum area of the stadium cleared, which thus happened. On 5 December 2004, the stadium was the site of the death of Brazilian footballer Cristiano Júnior during a Federation Cup match between his Dempo and Mohun Bagan. He collided with the Bagan and India international goalkeeper Subrata Pal while scoring his second goal for Dempo before collapsing to the ground. He was announced dead on arrival at the hospital.

In 2006 the AFC Youth Championship was held at the stadium partially.

=== I-League era (2010–2014) ===
In 2010 the I-League 2nd Division was hosted by the Bangalore Football Stadium which saw local Bengaluru side HAL Bangalore promoted to the I-League, the top-tier football league in the country. The first ever I-League match at the stadium was held on 3 January 2011 in which HAL Bangalore took on Salgaocar. The match ended 1–0 for Salgaocar. After two seasons of being in the I-League the Bangalore Football Stadium was removed as a venue for the league when HAL Bangalore were relegated and thus not included in the 2012–13 season.

However, on 28 May 2013 it was officially announced that Bengaluru FC would be formed in the city for the 2013–14 season. Then on 20 July the stadium hosted a mega-event which officially launched the club and the stadium was officially announced as the home for the club for the upcoming season. The team then played their first ever match against Mohun Bagan at the stadium. Ending in a 1–1 draw, the encounter was made memorable by the crowd which was almost full to capacity.

The final I-League match to be played at the stadium was between Bengaluru FC and Pune on 28 March 2014. The match ended 1–1 with Anthony D'Souza scoring the final goal at the stadium. Overall, the average home attendance for Bengaluru FC at the stadium was 7,500.

The stadium in 2023, hosted matches of prestigious Stafford Challenge Cup.

== Redevelopment ==
On 5 December 2013 it was officially announced by FIFA that India would be the hosts of the 2017 FIFA U-17 World Cup, the country's first FIFA international competition. It was also announced that Bangalore would be among the choices for being a host city for the tournament. In March 2014 it was announced that at the end of the 2013–14 I-League season the stadium would be demolished and then a new stadium would be built on that exact spot.

However, as of 2023 the stadium had not built, having been postponed to a 2027 opening.

== National League records ==
=== Hindustan Aeronautics Limited ===
Season	League	P	W	D	L	F	A	Win %
2010–11	I-League	13	2	4	7	7	20	15%
2011–12	I-League	13	0	1	12	13	40	0%
Total		26	2	5	19	20	60	8%

=== Bengaluru FC ===
Season	League	P	W	D	L	F	A	Win %
2013–14	I-League	12	7	4	1	19	9	58%
Total		12	7	4	1	19	9	58%

=== FC Bengaluru United ===
Season	League	P	W	D	L	F	A	Win %
2019-20	I-League 2	8	4	2	2	12	6	50%
2020-21	I-League 2	3	0	2	1	4	6	0%
2022-23	I-League 2	12	7	2	3	24	8	58%
2023-24	I-League 2	14	6	2	6	21	19	43%
2024-25	I-League 2							
Total		8	8	0	0	20	7	100%

=== Sporting Club Bengaluru ===
Season	League	P	W	D	L	F	A	Win %
2023-24	I-League 3	1	1	0	0	3	1	100%
2023-24	I-League 2	7	7	0	0	17	6	100%
2024-25	I-League							
Total		8	8	0	0	20	7	100%

=== Diamond Harbour FC ===
Season	League	P	W	D	L	F	A	Win %
2023-24	I-League 3	2	1	1	0	5	2	50%
Total		2	1	1	0	5	2	50%

=== Doaba United FC ===
Season	League	P	W	D	L	F	A	Win %
2023-24	I-League 3	2	0	0	2	0	4	0%
Total		2	0	0	2	0	4	0%

=== Vatika FC ===
Season	League	P	W	D	L	F	A	Win %
2023-24	I-League 3	1	1	0	0	3	2	100%
Total		1	1	0	0	3	2	100%

== See also ==
- Sree Kanteerava Stadium
- New Bangalore Football Stadium
