= 2023–24 Mumbai Premier League =

111th season of the Mumbai Football League

Mumbai Premier League
- Season: 2023–24
- Dates: 30 October 2023 – May 2024
- Champions: MYJ–GMSC
- Promoted: MYJ–GMSC
- Relegated: JMJ (Mumbai Knights)
- Matches: 118
- Goals: 370 (3.14 per match)
- Highest scoring: MYJ–GMSC 11–0 JMJ

The 2023–24 Mumbai Premier League was the 111th season of the top-tier football league run by the Mumbai Football Association in Mumbai, representing the fifth tier of the Indian football league system.

Before the season began, the trophy was taken on a tour of Mumbai's most iconic locations such as the Gateway of India, Bandra railway station, Chhatrapati Shivaji Terminus, Shiv Sena Bhavan, and the Municipal Corporation Building.

Ambernath United Atlanta were the defending champions.

== Venues ==
Matches are played at the Neville D'Souza Football Turf in Bandra.

== Teams ==
Sixteen teams are participating in the 2023–24 edition of the Mumbai Premier League.

2023–24 Mumbai Premier League teams

Teams	Location
Ambernath United–Bombay Muslims	Ambernath
Ambernath United–Bombay Muslims	Mumbai Central
Mighty Young Joe–Goalorious Mother	Malad
Mighty Young Joe–Goalorious Mother	Borivali
PIFA Colaba	Colaba
Maharashtra Oranje	Powai
Community Football Club India (CFCI)	Dahisar
Hope United (Karnataka Sports Association)	Churchgate
Sellebrity	Bandra
Mumbai Kenkre	Mahim
Millat FC	Jogeshwari
DK Pharma	Badlapur
Mumbai Knights (JMJ Sports)	Bandra
Silver Innings (Protrack)	Mira Road
Iron Born–Rudra	Andheri
Kalina Rangers CFF	Santacruz
Reliance FYC	Navi Mumbai
ICL Payyade Mumbai FC	Borivali

=== Promoted/relegated teams ===
▲ from 2022 Super Division	▼ to 2023-24 Mumbai Super League
Kalina Rangers; Reliance FYC	Mumbai Strikers; India Rush

== League table ==
=== Mumbai Premier League ===
Pos	Team	Pld	W	D	L	GF	GA	GD	Pts	Qualification
1	MYJ–GMSC (C)	14	12	2	0	46	9	+37	38	2024–25 I-League 3 and 2024-25 MSSMFL
2	Maharashtra Oranje	14	10	2	2	50	12	+38	32	2024-25 MSSMFL
3	Hope United (KSA)	14	9	3	2	38	13	+25	30	
4	Millat	14	8	3	3	35	12	+23	27	
5	Reliance FYC	13	9	0	4	26	14	+12	27	
6	Kalina Rangers	13	8	1	4	41	19	+22	25	
7	Iron Born–Rudra	14	7	3	4	21	18	+3	24	
8	Mumbai Kenkre	13	7	1	5	31	18	+13	22	
9	DK Pharma	14	6	2	6	32	27	+5	20	
10	ICL Mumbai	14	4	2	8	26	25	+1	14	
11	CFCI	14	4	1	9	19	32	−13	13	
12	Silver Innings (Protrack)	14	3	0	11	9	54	−45	9	
13	Ambernath United–Bombay Muslims	14	2	0	12	6	40	−34	6	
14	Sellebrity	12	1	2	9	4	41	−37	5	
15	PIFA	14	0	2	12	4	57	−53	2	
16	Mumbai Knights (JMJ) (W)	0	0	0	0	0	0	0	0	Relegation to Mumbai Super League

Updated to match(es) played on 6 May 2024. Source: MFA official The Away End Football Counter
Rules for classification: 1) points; 2) goal difference; 3) number of goals scored
(C) Champions; (W) Withdrew

== See also ==
- 2023–24 Mumbai Super League
- 2023–24 in Indian football
- 2023–24 I-League 3
- 2023–24 Indian State Leagues
