= Arif Shaikh =

Indian footballer (born 1993)

Personal information
- Date of birth: 11 November 1993 (age 32)
- Place of birth: Mumbai, Maharashtra, India
- Height: 1.74 m (5 ft 8 1/2 in)
- Position: Striker

Team information
- Current team: SC Bengaluru
- Number: 32

Youth career
- Pune

Senior career*
| Years | Team | Apps | (Gls) |
| 2016–2017 | DSK Shivajians | | |
| 2017–2018 | Gokulam Kerala FC | 8 | (0) |
| 2019–2020 | ONGC FC | | |
| 2021–2022 | Corbett FC | 4 | (0) |
| 2022–2023 | Ambernath United Atlanta | 12 | (5) |
| 2023– | SC Bengaluru | 16 | (7) |
- * Club domestic league appearances and goals as of 28 December 2023

Arif Shaikh (born 11 November 1993) is an Indian professional footballer who plays as a striker for SC Bengaluru in the I-League.

== Career ==
Born in Mumbai, Maharashtra, Shaikh played in the Pune F.C. Academy during the I-League U19. After spending time with Pune, Shaikh signed with DSK Shivajians. He made his professional debut for the club on the final match day of the I-League season on 24 April 2016 against Mumbai. He came on as a 69th-minute substitute for Sampath Kuttimani as DSK Shivajians lost 4–0.

== Career statistics ==
As of 29 March 2024

| Club | Season | League | | | League Cup | | Domestic Cup | | Continental | | Total | |
| Club | Season | Division | Apps | Goals | Apps | Goals | Apps | Goals | Apps | Goals | Apps | Goals |
|---|---|---|---|---|---|---|---|---|---|---|---|---|
| DSK Shivajians | 2015–16 | I-League | 1 | 0 | — | — | — | — | — | — | 1 | 0 |
| DSK Shivajians | 2016–17 | I-League | 0 | 0 | — | — | — | — | — | — | 0 | 0 |
| Gokulam Kerala FC | 2017–18 | I-League | 8 | 0 | — | — | — | — | — | — | 8 | 0 |
| Corbett FC | 2021 | I-League 2 | 4 | 0 | — | — | — | — | — | — | 4 | 0 |
| Ambernath United Atlanta | 2022–23 | I-League 2 | 12 | 5 | — | — | — | — | — | — | 12 | 5 |
| Sporting Bengaluru | 2023–24 | I-League 3 | 8 | 5 | — | — | — | — | — | — | 8 | 5 |
| Sporting Bengaluru | 2023–24 | I-League 2 | 8 | 2 | — | — | — | — | — | — | 8 | 2 |
| Career total | | | 41 | 12 | 0 | 0 | 0 | 0 | 0 | 0 | 41 | 12 |
