= 2023 Chhattisgarh State Men's Football League Championship =

Chhattisgarh State Men's Football League Championship
- Season: 2022–23
- Dates: 11 March – 19 May 2023
- Matches played: 45
- Goals scored: 176 (3.91 per match)
- Biggest home win: RKM Academy 13–0 Mahamaya FC
- Biggest away win: ATK Champion FC 0–9 RKM Academy
- Highest scoring: RKM Academy 13–0 Mahamaya FC
- All statistics correct as of 17 May 2023.

The 2023 Chhattisgarh State Men's Football League Championship was the 2nd season of the Chhattisgarh State Men's Football League Championship, the fourth tier league in Indian football system, and Chhattisgarh's top-tier football league. RKM Academy were the defending champions.

== Teams ==
- ATK Champion FC
- Brahmavid Football Academy
- Mahamaya FC
- New Friends Club
- North East Institute
- RKM Football Academy
- Rajhara Mines FC
- Shera FC Academy
- Youth Boys

== Regular season ==
=== League table ===
Pos	Team	Pld	W	D	L	GF	GA	GD	Pts	Qualification or relegation
1	RKM Football Academy	16	13	3	0	63	4	+59	42	Champions and eligible for 2023-24 I-League 3
2	New Friends Dantewada	16	10	3	3	30	14	+16	33	Possible qualification for 2023-24 I-League 3
3	Youth Boys	16	9	4	3	28	13	+15	31	
4	Rajhara Mines	16	8	4	4	32	16	+16	28	
5	North East Institute	16	7	5	4	22	16	+6	26	
6	Brahmavid FA	16	3	4	9	7	29	−22	13	
7	Shera FA	16	3	3	10	12	32	−20	12	
8	Mahamaya	16	3	2	11	12	52	−40	11	
9	ATK Champion	16	1	2	13	11	41	−30	5	

Source: The Away End
Rules for classification: 1) points; 2) goal difference; 3) number of goals scored

== See also ==
- 2022–23 Indian State Leagues
