= Jagran Lakecity University =

Private university in Madhya Pradesh

- जागरण लेकसिटी विश्वविद्यालय
- Motto: Igniting Minds, Changing Lives
- Type: Private
- Established: 24 April 2013
- Affiliations: UGC, AICTE, CII, AIMA, IALS, BCI, AUAP
- Chancellor: Hari Mohan Gupta
- Vice-Chancellor: Prof. (Dr.) Nilanjan Chattopadhyay
- Faculty: 250+
- Students: 2,500+
- Location: Bhopal, Madhya Pradesh, India
- Campus: 40 Acres; Semi Urban
- Nickname: JLU Bhopal
- Website: jlu.edu.in

Jagran Lakecity University (JLU) is a private university established under Section 2(f) of UGC Act 1956 and is based out of Bhopal, Madhya Pradesh. The university offers 50+ degree programs to more than 2,500 students.

JLU was ranked 30th best private university in India by the Education World in 2021, and also got the E-Learning Excellence for Academic Digitisation (E-Lead) Certification 2020–21 by QS I–Gauge.

== History ==
The institute was initially set up in 2009 as the first Leeds Beckett University partner in India, with the support of Jagran Social Welfare Society. In 2013, the institute was renamed to Jagran Lakecity University after it gained UGC accreditation and became a government approved state private university.

== JLU Student Enrichment Hub ==
The Chandanpur campus is spread in an area of 40 acres. It has 8 academic blocks with classrooms, media center, administrative building, several labs and library with more than 35,000 books and journals. The library is subscribed to DELNET and other internet libraries and has audio/video recordings of various academic books.

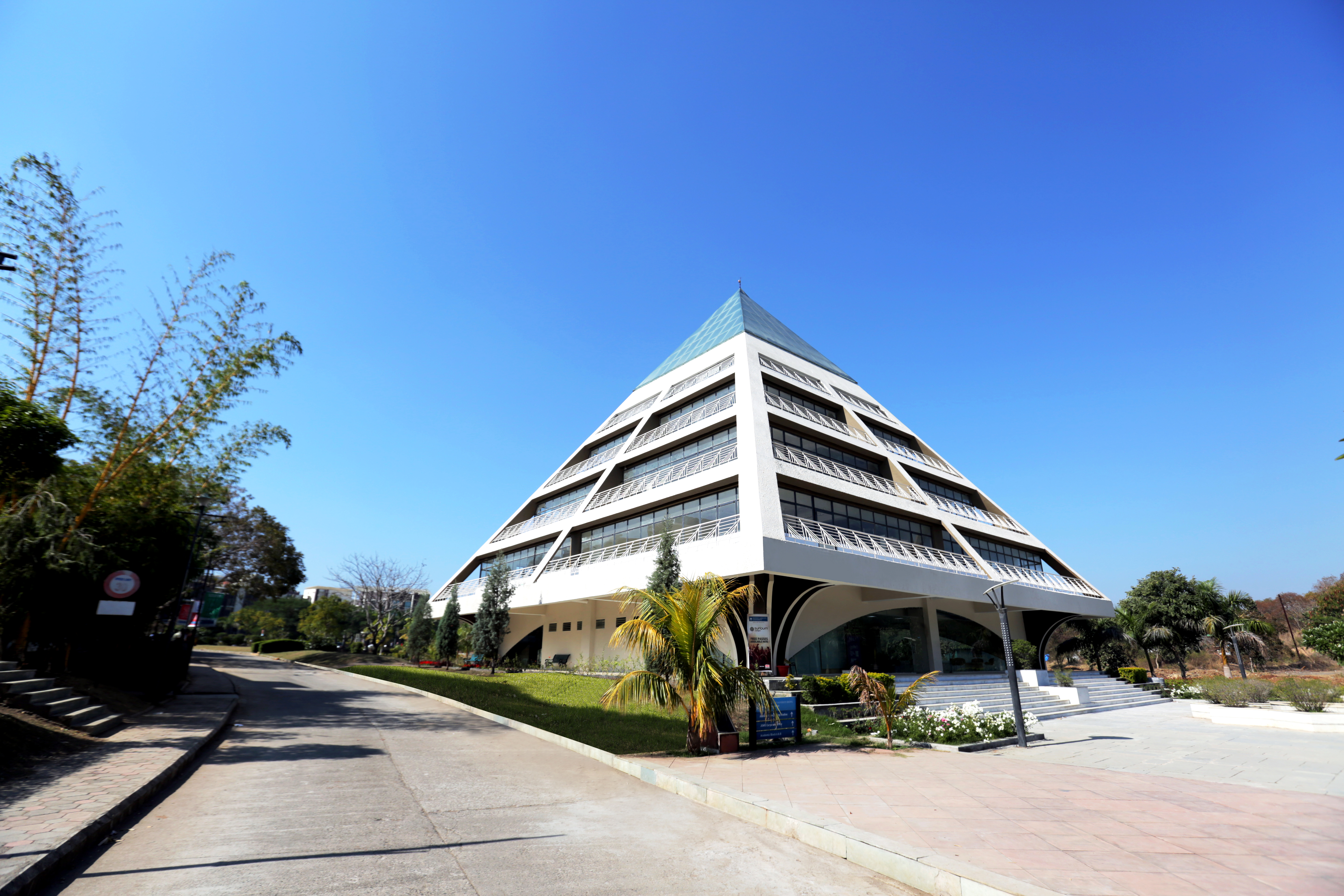
Pyramid, the admission block, JLU Bhopal

== Academics ==
Jagran Lakecity University offers undergraduate, postgraduate, and diploma courses in law, economics, engineering, journalism, management, design, filmmaking and animation, culinary arts, advertising and PR, English literature, international relations, psychology and sports. The university also publishes its own journal titled "Jagran International Journal on Contemporary Research", where research papers prepared by academicians worldwide are published.

The university has MOUs with many national and international institutions, including University of Lincoln, University College London, Indo Euro Synchronization, APS Mechatronik, United Nations Association of Australia, RMIT University, University of West Los Angeles, Imperial College London, and Guizhou University.

== Schools ==
Jagran Lakecity University has 10 schools for various courses:

- School of Engineering and Technology (SOET)
- School of Law (SOL)
- School of Commerce and Economics (SOCE)
- Jagran Lakecity Business School (JLBS)
- School of Hospitality and Tourism (SOHT)
- Jagran School of Public Policy and International Affairs (JSPPIA)
- Jagran School of Journalism and Communication (JSJC)
- School of Humanities and Social Science (SOHSS)
- School of Sports Science and Physical Education (SOSSPH)
- Jagran School of Visual Arts & Design (JSVAD)

== See also ==
- Lakecity FC
