= KLASA FC =

Association football club in Manipur, India

KLASA
- Full name: Keinou Library and Sports Association Football Club
- Founded: 1972; 54 years ago
- Ground: Khuman Lampak Main Stadium
- Capacity: 35,285
- Owner: KLASA Pvt Ltd
- Head coach: Abu Osama Shaikh
- League: Manipur State League; I-League 3
- Website: klasafc.com
Home colours	Away colours

KLASA Football Club (known fully as Keinou Library and Sports Association Football Club) is an Indian professional football club based in Keinou, Bishnupur, Manipur. It was the 2022 season champion of Manipur State League, but not granted the I-League 2 nomination. However, they joined the newly-established I-League 3.

== History ==
=== Beginning ===
The Keinou Library and Sports Association, known as KLASA FC at the present day, was registered in 1972. KLASA aimed to look for development in the library and sports field in Keinou and adjoining areas. One of the pioneering personalities of KLASA was Chanambam Prakash Singh, a player of Indian Air Force. He started conducting training at Keinou Kangjeibung, and KLASA emerged as district champion in the consecutive years of 1976, 1977, and 1978. KLASA also claimed victories among the various inter-district tournaments. Thus, the club's popularity increased yearly.

=== Manipur State League ===
KLASA first got promoted to the Manipur State League, the top tier league of Manipur, in 2014. In the 2017 season, KLASA FC staged a league upset by finishing at the top of the table. However, they lost to NEROCA FC in the final and end up being the runners-up.

MSL came back after a hiatus due to the COVID-19 pandemic in the 2021 season. KLASA finished the league toppers and qualified for the final stage. KLASA beat Sagolband United 2-1 in the semi-final and emerged as champions after defeating SSU 1-0 in the final, grabbing the title of the champions of Manipur for the first time.

In the 15th edition of the Manipur State League, KLASA finished second in the group stage. In the semi-final match, KLASA faced KIYC and entered the final after beating them comfortably. KLASA FC defeated RAU 3-0 in the final match and became the consecutive champions of Manipur.

=== I-League 2 ===
After winning the 2022 Manipur State League, KLASA qualified for the I-League 2. Instead of nominating them as per the AIFF regulations, the state association nominated another team, KIYC who went out in the quarter final. After a series of appeals by the club and protests against the unfair treatment to its league champions, no team from Manipur played in the following I-League 2 season.

=== I-League 3 ===
KLASA's dream of playing in the national stage finally started to take shape after they got nominated for the 2023–24 inaugural I-League 3 season. In the first round, they were placed in Group B along with Baroda, Sports Odisha, Jaipur Elite, and United Chirang Duar. KLASA became the table toppers without losing a single match, winning 1–0 against Baroda in the first match, drawing 0–0 with Jaipur Elite, winning 1–0 against Sports Odisha, and beating United Chirang Duar by 2–1 in their final match. As table toppers, KLASA became the first team to reach the playoffs, but could not progress any further. In the final round (play-offs), the club finished their campaign in fifth place.

== Honours ==
=== Domestic league ===
- Manipur State League
  - Champions (2): 2021–22, 2022–23

=== Domestic cups ===
- Shirui Lily Cup
  - Runners-up (1): 2021
- K. Shantibala (AJSA) Football Tournament
  - Winners (3): 1997–98, 2003–04, 2009–10
- Jiri Cup
  - Winners (2): 2015–16, 2017–18

== See also ==
- List of football clubs in Manipur
- Sports in Manipur
- Northeast Derby (India)
