= Karbi Anglong Morning Star FC =

Association football club in Assam, India

Karbi Anglong Morning Star
- Full name: Karbi Anglong Morning Star Football Club
- Nicknames: The Blue Giant; The Morning Star
- Short name: KAMS
- Founded: 8 November 2008; 17 years ago (as Morning Star FC)
- Ground: KASA Stadium
- Capacity: 9,000
- President: Sengkan Ronghang
- Head coach: Khogen Singh Wangkhem
- League: I-League 2 Assam State Premier League
- Website: karbianglongsportsassociation.com
Home colours	Away colours	Third colours

Karbi Anglong Morning Star Football Club, simply referred to as Morning Star, is an Indian professional football club based in Diphu, Assam that competes in the Assam State Premier League. Karbi Anglong Morning Star represents two districts of Assam, consisting of Karbi Anglong and West Karbi Anglong.

== History ==
The club was founded in 2008 with the vision of elevating the standard of football in the region and providing a platform for local talent. The club's inception was driven by a group of passionate football enthusiasts and local sports officials who recognized the need for a professional football identity in Karbi Anglong. In its initial years, the club focused on building a competitive squad and fostering local talent, participating in various regional competitions.

== Stadium ==
Karbi Anglong Morning Star FC plays its home matches at the KASA Stadium in Diphu, which boasts a capacity of 9,000 spectators. The stadium is equipped with modern facilities and serves as a focal point for sports and community events in the region.

== Honours ==
- Assam State Premier League
  - Champions (2): 2015, 2023–24

== See also ==
- Northeast Derby
