= SC Bengaluru =

Indian association football club based in Bangalore

Sporting Club Bengaluru
- Full name: Sporting Club Bengaluru
- Nickname: The Golden Tigers
- Short name: SCB
- Founded: 2022; 4 years ago
- Ground: Bangalore Football Stadium
- Capacity: 8,400
- CEO: Kishore S. Reddy
- Head coach: Vacant
- League: I-League 2; Karnataka Super Division
- 2024–25: I-League, 12th of 13
- Website: scbengaluru.com
Home colours	Away colours	Third colours

Sporting Club Bengaluru, also known as Sporting Bengaluru, (nicknamed The Golden Tigers) is an Indian professional football club based in Bangalore, Karnataka. The club currently competes in the I-League 2, the third tier of the Indian football league system, and the Karnataka Super Division. The club was founded in 2022 by Tony Sohi (UK), Kulbir Sohi (UK), Adrian Wright (UK) and Kishore S Reddy (India).

== History ==
SC Bengaluru made its debut in the 2022–23 BDFA Super Division. They clinched the title in their inaugural season ahead of their closest rivals FC Bengaluru United, attaining 46 points in 18 games. With their win, they closed on a spot in the 2023–24 I-League 3, the newly formed fourth tier of the Indian football league system. The club managed to qualify for the I-League 2 after beating Kerala United by 2–1 in the playoffs. The club clinched back-to-back titles in the 2023–24 season as they won the I-League 2, earning promotion to the 2024–25 I-League.

== Kit manufacturers and shirt sponsors ==
Since forming in April 2022, SCB signed sports agency Sporting Group International as its principal partner, and Meyba as its official kit partner. They also struck up a partnership with MuscleBlaze as nutrition partner.

Period	Kit manufacturer	Shirt sponsor
2022	Meyba	Sporting Group International
2023	MS Sports	Sporting Group International
2024–present	MS Sports	Sporting Group International

== Stadium ==
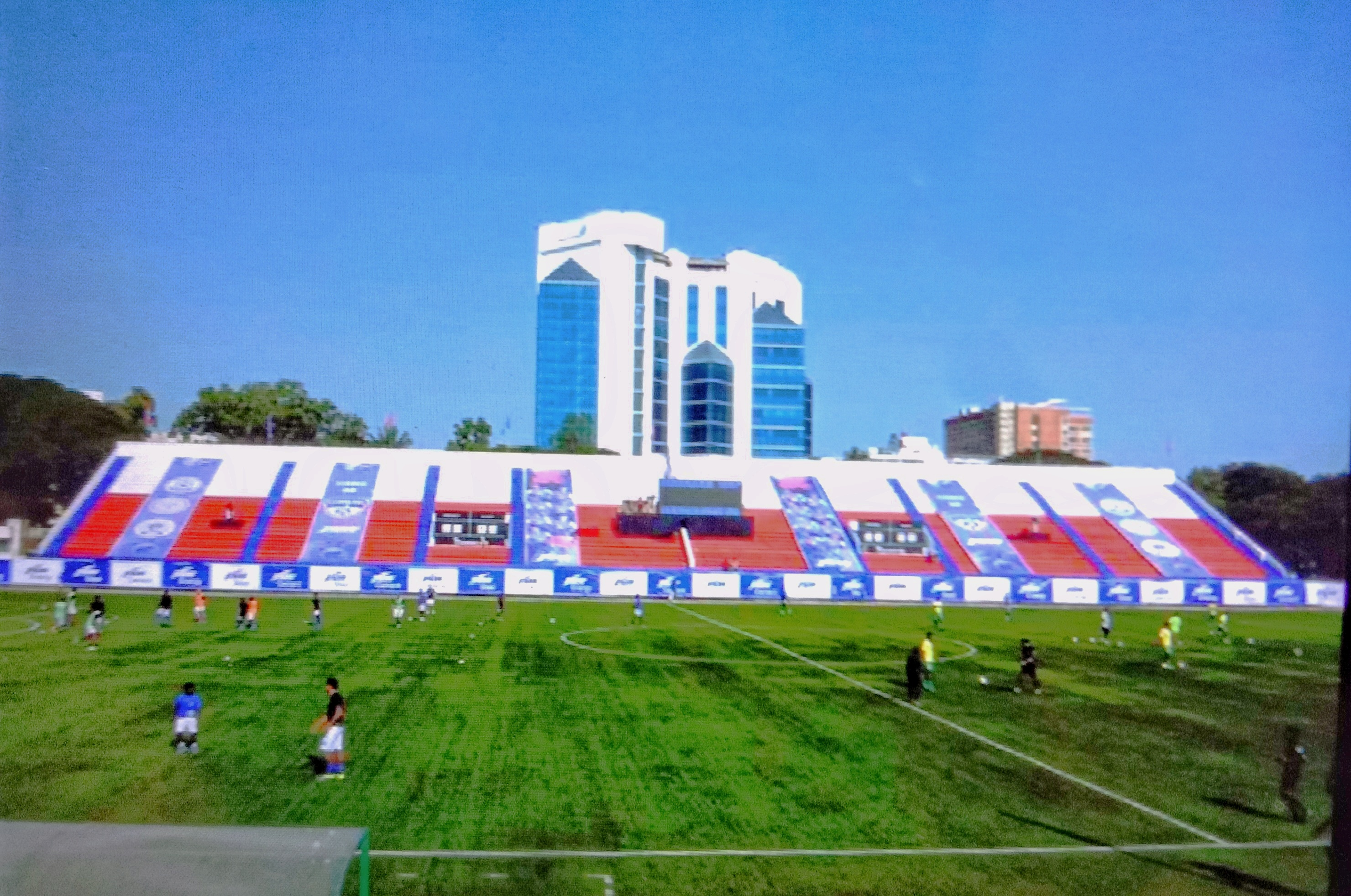
Bangalore Football Stadium

Sporting Club Bengaluru plays its home matches at the Bangalore Football Stadium.

== Players ==
=== First-team squad (2025) ===
Note: Flags indicate national team as defined under FIFA eligibility rules; some limited exceptions apply. Players may hold more than one non-FIFA nationality.

No.	Pos.	Nation	Player
1	GK	IND	Satyajit Bordoloi
4	DF	SRB	Slavko Lukić
5	DF	IND	Manoj Kannan
6	MF	IND	Kishan Singh
7	FW	IND	Krishananda Singh
8	FW	UGA	Henry Kisekka
9	FW	IND	Salam Johnson Singh (on loan from Bengaluru)
10	FW	ESP	Jordan Lamela
11	FW	IND	Thomyo Shimray
12	DF	IND	Shafeel PP
14	MF	IND	Vignesh V
15	DF	IND	Arjun Gouda
16	DF	IND	Shankar Sampingiraj
17	FW	IND	Ishaan Raghunanda
20	MF	IND	Sk Sahil

No.	Pos.	Nation	Player
21	DF	IND	Shravan Shetty
22	DF	POR	Carlos Lomba (captain)
23	FW	IND	Ashish Jha
25	DF	IND	Oinam Sanatomba Singh
27	FW	IND	Saiyyad Umar
29	FW	IND	Aadarsh Narayanapuram
30	MF	IND	Jibin Devassy
32	FW	IND	Arif Shaikh
33	FW	IND	Shanid Valan
34	GK	IND	Bishal Lama
37	GK	JPN	Yuya Kuriyama
38	FW	ESP	Álex Sánchez
40	GK	IND	Pranav S
77	DF	IND	R Neil Joseph
88	MF	IND	Tangva Ragui (on loan from Mohammedan)

== Technical staff ==
As of 5 April 2026

Role	Name
Team manager	(India) Sujan Subramanya
Head coach	(India) M. G. Ramachandran
Assistant coach	(India) Alex Praveen
Physiotherapist	(India) A. R. Dileep Kumar
Goalkeeper coach	(India) Nikhil Bernard

== Records and statistics ==
=== Season by season ===
Season	League									Playoffs	Super Cup	Other competitions	Top scorer(s)	
Season	Division	Pld	W	D	L	GF	GA	Pts	Pos	Playoffs	Super Cup	Durand Cup	Player(s)	Goals
2023–24	I-League 3	8	5	2	1	19	8	17	1st	3rd ▲	Did not participate	Did not participate	(India) Arif Shaikh	5
2023–24	I-League 2	14	11	0	3	28	12	33	Champions ▲	–	Did not participate	Did not participate	(India) Thomyo Shimray	11
2024–25	I-League	5	1	1	3	6	9	4	–	–	Did not participate	Did not participate	–	–

=== Managerial record ===
Name	Nationality	From	To	P	W	D	L	GF	GA	Win%
Chinta Chandrashekar Rao	India	1 October 2023	present	27	17	3	7	53	29	62.96

== Honours ==
=== League ===
- I-League 2
  - Champions (1): 2023–24
- I-League 3 Playoffs
  - Third place (1): 2023–24
- BDFA Super Division
  - Champions (1): 2022–23

== See also ==
- List of football clubs in India
- FC Bengaluru United
