= I-League 3 =

Fourth division men's association football league in India

- Organising body: AIFF
- Founded: 13 June 2023; 3 years ago
- Country: India
- Confederation: AFC
- Number of clubs: 20 (tentatively)
- Level on pyramid: 4
- Promotion to: I-League 2
- Relegation to: Indian State Leagues (provisionally)
- Domestic cup: Durand Cup (Note: Participation via an invitation)
- Current champions: Banaras Baghpat (1st title)
- Most championships: Banaras Baghpat; Diamond Harbour; Sporting Goa (1 title each)
- Broadcasters: AIFF; SportsKPI; TGS Live; M&P Sports (online streaming)
- Website: indianfootballleague.in
- Current: 2026–27

The I-League 3 is an Indian men's professional football league. It forms the fourth tier of the Indian football league system, below the I-League 2 and above the Indian State Leagues, which teams get promoted from through a nomination from the state board.

== History ==
=== National Football League NFL3 ===
The National Football League Third Division (NFL 3rd Division) was the men's third-tier of the Indian football league system from 2006 to 2007. Founded by the All India Football Federation (AIFF) in 2006, the NFL was the first third division football league in India to be organized on a national scale. The league was played from 25 November up to 18 December 2006 as a promotional tournament for Indian National Football League Second Division. Five teams were promoted to the second division. AIFF folded the league in 2007 after the first edition.

=== I-League 3 ===
For the first time, the AIFF introduced qualifiers for the I-League 2 in the 2022–23 season. On 13 June 2023, the AIFF league committee announced introducing a new league below the I-League 2, where champions of State leagues and nominated clubs will play. State FAs have to nominate a team before July 31. The AIFF wants to create a competitive pyramid with a concrete progression pathway, aimed to allow even the smallest of clubs to get promoted to the higher divisions.

== All-time clubs ==
Currently in I-League 3
Currently in Indian Super League, Indian Football League or I-League 2
Currently in State leagues
Defunct clubs

As of May 2026

Pos.	Club	City	S	P	W	D	L	GF	GA	GD	Pts	Appearances
1	KLASA	Bishnupur, Manipur	3	24	12	7	5	33	21	12	43	2023–24, 2024–25, 2025–26
2	Diamond Harbour	Diamond Harbour, West Bengal	2	13	11	1	1	30	8	22	34	2023–24, 2024–25
3	Chanmari	Aizawl, Mizoram	1	9	8	0	1	22	4	18	24	2024–25
4	Banaras Baghpat	Baghpat, Uttar Pradesh	1	9	6	2	1	23	7	16	20	2025–26
5	Kerala United	Malappuram, Kerala	2	12	5	4	3	20	14	6	19	2023–24, 2024–25
6	Sunrise Club	Cuttack, Odisha	1	9	5	3	1	19	7	12	18	2025–26
7	Sporting Goa	Panaji, Goa	1	8	5	3	1	17	3	14	17	2023–24
8	Sporting Bengaluru	Bengaluru, Karnataka	1	8	5	3	1	19	8	11	17	2023–24
9	Dempo	Panaji, Goa	1	8	5	3	1	11	2	9	17	2023–24
10	Raengdai	Noney, Manipur	1	9	5	2	2	15	9	6	17	2025–26
11	Karbi Anglong Morning Star	Diphu, Assam	1	8	5	0	3	27	11	16	15	2024–25
12	Lakecity	Bhopal, Madhya Pradesh	2	8	4	3	1	17	10	7	15	2023–24, 2024–25
13	SAT	Tirur, Kerala	1	8	4	2	2	15	12	3	14	2024–25
14	MYJ–GMSC	Mumbai, Maharashtra	1	8	4	1	3	14	8	6	13	2024–25
15	TRAU	Imphal, Manipur	1	9	3	4	2	10	9	1	13	2025–26
16	Sesa	Sanquelim, Goa	1	8	3	3	2	11	11	0	12	2024–25
17	Garhwal Heroes	New Delhi, Delhi	2	8	4	0	4	11	14	-3	12	2023–24, 2024–25
18	Sports Odisha	Cuttack, Odisha	2	8	3	2	3	10	10	0	11	2023–24, 2024–25
19	Abbas Union	Hyderabad, Telangana	2	12	3	2	7	12	18	-6	11	2023–24, 2024–25
20	Rangdajied United	Shillong, Meghalaya	1	4	2	2	0	8	2	6	8	2023–24
21	ARA	Ahemedabad, Gujarat	2	8	2	2	4	13	13	0	8	2023–24, 2025–26
22	Kickstart	Bengaluru, Karnataka	1	4	2	1	1	15	4	11	7	2023–24
23	HAL	Bengaluru, Karnataka	1	4	2	1	1	9	3	6	7	2024–25
24	Agniputhra	Bengaluru, Karnataka	1	4	2	1	1	5	2	3	7	2025–26
25	Bhawanipore	Kolkata, West Bengal	1	4	2	1	1	8	6	2	7	2023–24
26	Kenkre	Mumbai, Maharashtra	1	4	2	1	1	8	8	0	7	2024–25
27	Downtown Heroes	Srinagar, Jammu and Kashmir	1	8	2	1	5	13	17	-4	7	2024–25
28	Chhaygaon	Chaygaon, Assam	1	8	2	1	5	14	21	-7	7	2025–26
29	Dalbir	Patiala, Punjab	1	8	2	1	5	5	15	-10	7	2024–25
30	International	Phagwara, Punjab	1	4	2	0	2	5	3	2	6	2023–24
31	Samaleswari	Sambalpur, Odisha	1	4	2	0	2	6	5	1	6	2025–26
32	Royal Rangers	Delhi	1	4	2	0	2	7	7	0	6	2025–26
33	Vatika	Gurgaon, Haryana	1	4	2	0	2	5	7	-2	6	2023–24
34	Charutar Vidya Mandal	Vallabh Vidyanagar, Gujarat	1	4	2	0	2	5	8	-3	6	2024–25
35	BLG – The Diamond Rock	Balaghat, Madhya Pradesh	1	3	1	0	2	3	6	-3	6	2025–26
36	New Friends	Bade Bacheli, Chhattisgarh	2	8	2	0	6	7	38	-31	6	2023–24, 2025–26
37	Zinc FA	Udaipur, Rajasthan	1	4	1	2	1	7	6	1	5	2025–26
38	Mawlai	Shillong, Meghalaya	1	4	1	2	1	6	6	0	5	2025–26
39	United Chirang Duar	Chirang, Assam	1	4	1	2	1	5	5	0	5	2023–24
40	KIYC	Imphal, Manipur	1	4	1	1	2	8	7	1	4	2023–24
41	Southern Sporting	Imphal, Manipur	1	4	1	1	2	5	5	0	4	2024–25
42	CD Salgaocar	Vasco, Goa	1	4	1	1	2	2	4	-2	4	2025–26
43	Baroda	Vadodara, Gujarat	1	4	1	0	3	3	5	-2	3	2023–24
44	Corbett	Rudrapur, Uttarakhand	1	4	1	0	3	3	7	-4	3	2024–25
45	Sikkim Brotherhood	Gangtok, Sikkim	1	4	1	0	3	6	11	-5	3	2025–26
46	Coramandal	Vishakhapatnam, Andhra Pradesh	1	4	1	0	3	4	12	-8	3	2024–25
47	Doaba United	Jalandhar, Punjab	1	4	1	0	3	3	11	-8	3	2023–24
48	JIT	Pondicherry	1	4	1	0	3	2	11	-9	3	2023–24
49	Jaipur Elite	Jaipur, Rajasthan	2	8	0	3	5	5	15	-10	3	2023–24, 2024–25
50	RKM	Narayanpur, Chhattisgarh	2	8	1	0	7	6	25	-19	3	2023–24, 2024–25
51	Maharashtra Oranje	Mumbai, Maharashtra	1	4	0	2	2	8	10	-2	2	2024–25
52	Mumbay	Mumbai, Maharashtra	1	4	0	2	2	5	9	-4	2	2025–26
53	Ghaziabad City	Ghaziabad, Uttar Pradesh	1	4	0	1	3	3	9	-6	1	2024–25
54	Bhuna FC	Bhuna, Haryana	1	4	0	1	3	3	20	-17	1	2024–25
55	Citadel Godavari Legends	Rajahmundry, Andhra Pradesh	1	3	0	0	3	0	6	-6	0	2025–26
56	Techtro Swades	Una, Himachal Pradesh	1	4	0	0	4	2	10	-8	0	2025–26
57	Millat	Mumbai, Maharashtra	1	4	0	0	4	1	14	-13	0	2023–24
58	NEROCA	Imphal, Manipur										2026–27
59	Sher-e-Punjab SC	Ropar, Punjab										2026–27
60	Godavari FC	Rajahmundry, Andhra Pradesh										2026–27
61	Kuppuraj FC	Pondicherry										2026–27
62	Nongkseh SS&CC	Shillong, Meghalaya										2026–27
63	GOG FCC	Pune, Maharashtra										2026–27
64	RT Boys FC	Hyderabad, Telangana										2026–27

=== Relegated to I-League 3 ===
Relegated clubs from I-League 2 to I-League 3
Season	Clubs
2023–24	Kenkre, Maharashtra Oranje
2024–25	TRAU, KLASA

=== Clubs promoted from I-League 3 ===
Promoted clubs from I-League 3 to I-League 2
Season	Clubs
2023–24	Sporting Goa, Dempo, Sporting Bengaluru
2024–25	Diamond Harbour, Chanmari, SAT, KLASA
2025–26	Karbi Anglong Morning Star, MYJ–GMSC

== Results ==
Season	Champions	Runners-up	Third place	No. of clubs
2023–24	Sporting Goa	Dempo	Sporting Bengaluru	25
2024–25	Diamond Harbour	Chanmari	SAT	25
2025–26	Banaras Baghpat	Raengdai	Sunrise	19
2026–27				19

== Media coverage ==
Period	TV telecast	Online streaming
2023–present		YouTube

== See also ==
- Football in India
- History of Indian football
- List of football clubs in India
- NFL Second Division
- NFL Third Division
- Santosh Trophy
