= Lakecity FC =

Indian association football club based in Bhopal

Lakecity
- Full name: Lakecity Football Club
- Short name: LFC; LCFC
- Founded: 2022; 4 years ago
- Ground: Jagran Lakecity University Stadium
- Capacity: 1,800
- Owner: HMG Centre for Sports Excellence
- Chairman: Abhishek Mohan Gupta
- Head coach: Mangesh Desai
- League: I-League 3 Madhya Pradesh Premier League
- Website: hmgsports.org
Home colours	Away colours	Third colours

Lakecity Football Club is an Indian professional football club based in Bhopal, Madhya Pradesh. The club currently competes in the Madhya Pradesh Premier League. After winning the 2023–24 MPPL season, they earned promotion to the I-League 3.

== History ==
Lakecity Football Club was founded in 2022 by Jagran Lakecity University. In 2023, Lakecity was nominated by the Madhya Pradesh Football Association for the 2023–24 I-League 3 season as being the champions of the Madhya Pradesh Premier League. Lakecity finished 2nd in group A, thus failing to qualify for the playoffs.

== Kit manufacturers and shirt sponsors ==
Period	Kit manufacturer	Shirt sponsor
2022—2024	Nivia Sports	Jagran Lakecity University
2024—present	Nivia Sports	Shrewsbury

== Personnel ==
Position	Name
Chairman	(India) Abhishek Mohan Gupta
Head coach	(India) Prashant Thapa
Team manager	(India) Sourabh Velvanshi
Physio	(India) Roopesh Gurjar

== Honours ==
=== League ===
- Madhya Pradesh Premier League
  - Champions (3): 2022–23, 2023–24, 2024–25
- Bhopal League
  - Champions (1): 2022
  - Runners up (1): 2023
- U19 DFA Bhopal League
  - Champions (1): 2024

== See also ==
Madan Maharaj FC
