= KASA Stadium =

Multipurpose stadium in Assam, India

- Interactive map of KASA Stadium
- Full name: Karbi Anglong Sports Association Stadium
- Location: Diphu, Karbi Anglong, Assam, India
- Coordinates: 25.84653°N 93.4393168°E
- Owner: Karbi Anglong Sports Association
- Capacity: 9,000
- Surface: Astroturf

Construction
- Opened: 2018

Tenants
- Karbi Anglong Morning Star FC; Assam State Premier League

KASA Stadium or Karbi Anglong Sports Association (KASA) Stadium is a multi-purpose stadium in Diphu, Karbi Anglong, Assam, India. It is used mainly for football and athletics.

== Stadium ==
The stadium has capacity of 9,000 spectators. The inaugural friendly match was held between the then champions of the Assam State Premier League, Karbi Anglong Morning Star, and Asaduzzaman FC from Bangladesh.

== Competitive sports ==
The stadium hosts the CEM Gold Cup football tournament, organised jointly by the Karbi Anglong Sports Association, West Karbi Anglong Sports Association, and Karbi Anglong Autonomous Council (KAAC). The 5th edition of the tournament was won by Karbi Anglong Morning Star FC by defeating Hyderabad Reserves and Academy 4—2 in the penalty shootout.

== Facility ==
The wider KASA Sports Complex features indoor badminton and basketball halls, a gymnasium, guest rooms, and an aquatic arena adjacent to the main stadium.
