= RKM Football Academy =

Indian association football club

- Full name: Ramakrishna Mission Football Academy
- Short name: RKMFA
- Founded: 2017; 8 years ago
- Ground: Ramakrishna Mission Sports Complex
- Capacity: 1,000
- League: Chhattisgarh State Men's Football League Championship; I-League 3
| Home colours | Away colours | Third colours |

Ramakrishna Mission Football Academy derived as RKM FA is an Indian professional football club and academy based in Narainpur, Chhattisgarh. It is also the first football club from the state to participate in the U17 Youth Cup and the I-League 2.

== History ==
RKM Football Academy became the champion of the inaugural season of Chhattisgarh State Men's Club Championship and qualified for the 2022–23 I-League 2. They retained their title in 2023 and qualified for the inaugural season of the I-League 3.

== Players (2023) ==
Note: Flags indicate national team as defined under FIFA eligibility rules; some limited exceptions apply. Players may hold more than one non-FIFA nationality.

| No. | Pos. | Nation | Player |
|---|---|---|---|
| 1 | GK | (India) IND | Ayan Bhattacharya |
| 2 | DF | (India) IND | Munnaram Karma |
| 3 | DF | (India) IND | Dinesh Nureti |
| 4 | DF | (India) IND | Manoj Kumar Dorpa |
| 5 | DF | (India) IND | Suresh Kumar Dhruv (captain) |
| 6 | MF | (India) IND | Sanjay Halder |
| 7 | FW | (India) IND | Abhijit Pramanik |
| 8 | FW | (India) IND | Jaypal Singh Sirka |
| 11 | FW | (India) IND | Amit Nag |
| 12 | MF | (India) IND | Sursingh Nureti |
| 13 | FW | (India) IND | Anil Kumar Potai |
| 14 | FW | (India) IND | Manoj Kumar Lekam |
| 15 | DF | (India) IND | Akhilesh Kumar Uikey |
| 16 | DF | (India) IND | Prakash Potai |
| 17 | DF | (India) IND | Somnath Das |
| 18 | DF | (India) IND | Baldev Karanga |
| 19 | FW | (India) IND | Rajesh Kumar Korram |
| 20 | FW | (India) IND | Ankur Nureti |
| 22 | FW | (India) IND | Shankar Salam |

| No. | Pos. | Nation | Player |
|---|---|---|---|
| 23 | FW | (India) IND | Lalboilen Kilong |
| 24 | DF | (India) IND | Manish Kumar Kowachi |
| 25 | DF | (India) IND | Shashikant Kumeti |
| 26 | FW | (India) IND | Debjit Basak |
| 27 | DF | (India) IND | Sayif Ali Mullick |
| 28 | FW | (India) IND | Sudip Sarma Sarkar |
| 29 | GK | (India) IND | Debajyoti Singh |
| 30 | GK | (India) IND | Rakesh Bahadur |
| — | GK | (India) IND | Tirath Das Vaishnav |
| — | GK | (India) IND | Shyamsingh Nureti |
| — | DF | (India) IND | Rajuram Karanga |
| — | DF | (India) IND | Pilesh Kumar Uikey |
| — | DF | (India) IND | Ramesh Kumar Nureti |
| — | MF | (India) IND | Mehatar Korrm |
| — | MF | (India) IND | Wacham Venkateshwar |
| — | MF | (India) IND | Sukhdev Varda |
| — | MF | (India) IND | Nitesh Kumar Karanga |
| — | FW | (India) IND | Dhan Singh Korram |

== Honours ==
=== Domestic ===
- Chhattisgarh State Men's Football League Championship
  - Champions (3): 2022, 2023, 2024

=== Women ===
- Chhattisgarh State Women's Football League
  - Runners-up (1): 2024
