= Baroda FA =

Indian association football club based in Vadodara

Baroda
- Full name: Baroda Football Academy
- Short name: BFA
- Founded: 2008; 17 years ago
- Ground: VMC Sports Complex
- Capacity: 3,500
- President: Vimal Upadhyay
- Head coach: Naresh Auer (Men's)
- League: Men's: I-League 3 Gujarat SFA Club Championship; Women's: Gujarat State Women's League
- Website: www.barodafootballacademy.co.in
Home colours	Away colours

Baroda Football Academy is an Indian professional football academy-club based in Vadodara, Gujarat. It is part of the homonymous multi-sports club. The men's team of BFA participates in Gujarat SFA Club Championship.

== History ==
Baroda Football Academy is one of the largest and most successful football academies in Gujarat. Since its establishing, it has endowed nearly 9,000 children between 5 and 19 years of age with professional training.

Baroda Football Academy is accredited by the All India Football Federation, giving its players an opportunity for U13, U15 & U18 youth tournaments. Its senior team is member of the I-League 3.

Baroda FA won the Gujarat State Women's League in 2019.

In 2021, Baroda FA participated in Futsal Club Championship, after winning Gujrat Futsal Championship.
