= Narayanpur, Chhattisgarh =

Town in Chhattisgarh, India

Coordinates: 19.7167°N 81.2500°E

Narayanpur is the administrative headquarters of Narayanpur district of the Indian state of Chhattisgarh. It is one of two new districts created on 11 May 2007, originating from the Bastar district.
