= 2023–24 Shillong Lajong FC season =

2024–25 season of Shillong Lajong FC

Shillong Lajong FC
2024–25 season
- Owner: Shillong Lajong Pvt. Ltd.
- Manager: Jose Carlos Rodriguez Hevia
- Stadium: SSA Stadium
- I-League: 5th
- Durand Cup: Semifinals
- Super Cup: Group stage
- Top goalscorer: League: Douglas Tardin (11); All: Figo Syndai; Daniel Goncalves (4 each)
- Highest home attendance: 7,816 (v. Mohammedan, 6 April 2024)
- Lowest home attendance: 4,891 (v. Namdhari, 23 December 2023)
- Average home league attendance: 6,316
| Home colours | Away colours |

The 2024–25 season was Shillong Lajong's 41st season in existence and their tenth season in the I-League, and first since 2018–19. In addition to the league, they also competed in the Super Cup and Durand Cup tournaments.

== Current technical staff ==
| Position | Name |
|---|---|
| Head Coach | (Spain) Jose Carlos Rodriguez Hevia |
| Assistant Coach | (India) Birendra Thapa |
| Fitness and conditioning Coach | (India) George Vannie Lyngdoh Nongrang |
| Technical Director | (India) Habamutlang Lyngdoh |
| Goalkeeping Coach | (India) Soraisham Premjit Meitei |
| Physiotherapist | (India) Duyu Radhe |

== Players ==
=== First-team squad ===
As of 30 January 2025

Note: Flags indicate national team as defined under FIFA eligibility rules; some limited exceptions apply. Players may hold more than one non-FIFA nationality.

| No. | Pos. | Nation | Player |
|---|---|---|---|
| 22 | GK | (India) IND | Nikhil Deka |
| 1 | GK | (India) IND | Ranit Sarkar |
| 3 | DF | (India) IND | Aman Ahlawat |
| 4 | DF | (India) IND | Ronney Willson Kharbudon |
| 15 | DF | (India) IND | Saveme Tariang |
| 6 | DF | (India) IND | Kynsailang Khongsit |
| 20 | DF | (Brazil) BRA | Daniel Gonçalves |
| 26 | DF | (India) IND | Kenstar Kharshong |
| 17 | DF | (India) IND | Kitboklang Khriem |
| 8 | MF | (India) IND | Damaitphang Lyngdoh |
| 11 | MF | (India) IND | Hardy Cliff Nongbri |
| 12 | MF | (India) IND | Everbrightson Sana Mylliempdah |
| 5 | MF | (Brazil) BRA | Renan Paulino De Souza |
| 45 | MF | (India) IND | Batskhemlang Thangkhiew |
| 18 | MF | (India) IND | Gladdy Nelcen Kharbuli |

| No. | Pos. | Nation | Player |
|---|---|---|---|
| 21 | MF | (India) IND | Wadajied Kynsai Ryngkhlem |
| 25 | MF | (India) IND | Maxderidoff Wahlang |
| 27 | MF | (India) IND | Tremiki Lamurong |
| 16 | FW | (India) IND | Phrangki Buam |
| 7 | FW | (India) IND | Figo Syndai |
| 9 | FW | (Brazil) BRA | Douglas Rosa Tardin |
| 77 | FW | (India) IND | Sheen Stevenson Sohktung |
| 10 | FW | (Brazil) BRA | Marcos Rudwere Genar E Silva |

=== Reserve squad ===
Note: Flags indicate national team as defined under FIFA eligibility rules; some limited exceptions apply. Players may hold more than one non-FIFA nationality.

| No. | Pos. | Nation | Player |
|---|---|---|---|
| — | MF | (India) IND | Samchaphrang Lato |
| — | MF | (India) IND | Damonlang Pathaw |
| — | FW | (India) IND | Loanis Suchen |
| — | FW | (India) IND | Chanmitre Thma |
| — | MF | (India) IND | Babysunday Marngar |
| — | DF | (India) IND | Pynche Tyngkan |
| — | DF | (India) IND | Ronald Kharkongor |
| — | GK | (India) IND | Pranav S |
| 33 | GK | (India) IND | Wanteilang Malngiang |
| 50 | GK | (India) IND | Rajat Paul Lyngdoh |
| — | FW | (India) IND | Istarbor Marngar |
| 3 | DF | (India) IND | Abhay Chetri |

== Transfers ==
Players transferred in

| Date | Pos. | Player | Club | Fee | Ref. |
|---|---|---|---|---|---|
| 15 July 2023 | MF | (India) Batskhemlang Thangkhiew | (India) Rangdajied United FC | Free transfer | |
| 15 July 2023 | MF | (India) Neithovilie Chalieu | (India) Mawlai SC | Free transfer | |
| 15 July 2023 | MF | (India) Ronnie Wilson Kharbudon | (India) Academy | Free transfer | |
| 15 July 2023 | DF | (India) Kenstar Kharshong | (India) Mawlai SC | Free transfer | |
| 15 July 2023 | MF | (India) Kynsaibor Lhuid | (India) Academy | Free transfer | |
| 25 July 2023 | MF | (India) Ronaldkydon Lyngdoh Nonglait | (India) Academy | Free transfer | |
| 25 July 2023 | MF | (India) Kynsailang Khongsit | (India) Mumbai Kenkre | Free transfer | |
| 25 July 2023 | MF | (India) Laiwang Bohham | (India) Gokulam Kerala B | Free transfer | |
| 25 July 2023 | FW | (India) Istarbor Marngar | (India) Academy | Free transfer | |
| 31 July 2023 | FW | (India) Phrangki Buam | (India) Real Kashmir | Free transfer | |
| 2 September 2023 | DF | (Brazil) Daniel Gonçalves | | Free transfer | |
| 6 September 2023 | FW | (Senegal) Abdou Karim Samb | (Morocco) Ittihad Khemisset | Free transfer | |
| 7 September 2023 | MF | (Brazil) Renan Paulino | (Lithuania) Banga | Free transfer | |
| 8 September 2023 | MF | (India) Damaitphang Lyngdoh | (India) Bengaluru FC | Free transfer | |
| 22 September 2023 | DF | (India) Kongbrailatpam Manjit Sharma | (India) Bengaluru United | Free transfer | |
| 25 September 2023 | FW | (Japan) Takuto Miki | (Mongolia) FC Ulaanbaatar | Free transfer | |
| 28 October 2023 | GK | (India) Bishal Lama | (India) Gokulam Kerala | Free transfer | |
| 3 January 2024 | FW | (India) Denzil Kharshandi | (India) Mohammedan | Free transfer | |
| 4 January 2024 | FW | (Brazil) Douglas Tardin | (Thailand) Suphanburi | Free transfer | |
| 18 January 2024 | MF | (Nepal) Arik Bista | (Nepal) Butwal Lumbini | Free transfer | |
| 30 January 2024 | FW | (Brazil) Marcos Rudwere | (Slovenia) Slovan Hlohovec | Free transfer | |

Players transferred out

| Date | Pos. | No | Player | Club | Fee | Ref. |
|---|---|---|---|---|---|---|
| 13 July 2023 | GK | 40 | (India) Bishal Lama | (India) Gokulam Kerala | Free Agent | |
| 1 August 2023 | GK | | (India) Guidle Syiemlieh | | Free Agent | |
| 1 August 2023 | DF | | (India) Aman Ahlawat | | Free Agent | |
| 1 August 2023 | DF | | (India) Sambor Kharshnoh | | Free Agent | |
| 1 August 2023 | FW | | (India) Amon Lepcha | | Free Agent | |
| 1 December 2023 | FW | 9 | (Japan) Takuto Miki | | Free Agent | |
| 25 January 2024 | FW | 19 | (Senegal) Abdou Karim Samb | | Free Agent | |

== Competitions ==
=== Overview ===
| Competition | First match | Last match | Starting round | Final position | Record | | | | | | | |
| Competition | First match | Last match | Starting round | Final position | Pld | W | D | L | GF | GA | GD | Win % |
|---|---|---|---|---|---|---|---|---|---|---|---|---|
| I-League | 3 November 2023 | 13 April 2024 | Match day 1 | 8th | 24 | 8 | 7 | 9 | 36 | 37 | −1 | 33.33 |
| Super Cup | 10 January 2024 | 20 January 2024 | Group stage | Group stage | 3 | 0 | 0 | 3 | 2 | 7 | −5 | 0.00 |
| Durand Cup | 4 August 2023 | 13 August 2023 | Group stage | Group stage | 3 | 1 | 0 | 2 | 2 | 11 | −9 | 33.33 |
| Total | | | | | 30 | 9 | 7 | 14 | 40 | 55 | −15 | 30.00 |

Source: Competitions

=== I-League ===
==== League table ====
| Pos | Team | Pld | W | D | L | GF | GA | GD | Pts |
|---|---|---|---|---|---|---|---|---|---|
| 6 | Dempo | 22 | 8 | 5 | 9 | 35 | 33 | +2 | 29 (Note: Head-to-head: Dempo 4, Namdhari 1) |
| 7 | Namdhari | 22 | 8 | 5 | 9 | 28 | 30 | −2 | 29 (Note: Namdhari was deducted three points for fielding an ineligible player, then awarded three in another ruling, which was also later overturned.) |
| 8 | Shillong Lajong | 22 | 7 | 7 | 8 | 46 | 45 | +1 | 28 |
| 9 | Sreenidi Deccan | 22 | 7 | 7 | 8 | 34 | 37 | −3 | 28 |
| 10 | Aizawl | 22 | 6 | 5 | 11 | 35 | 46 | −11 | 23 (Note: Aizawl was awarded two points after Churchill Brothers fielded an ineligible player.) |

Source: I-League
Rules for classification: 1) Points; 2) Head-to-head points; 3) Head-to-head goal difference; 4) Total goal difference; 5) Total goals scored; 6) Drawing of lots
(Note: Head-to-head applies only after all relevant matches are played)

==== Matches ====
Note: I-League announced the fixtures for the 2023–24 season on 6 October 2023.

| 3 November 2023 1 | Mohammedan | 1–1 | Shillong Lajong | Kolkata |
| 19:00 IST | David Lalhlansanga 53' | Report | Takuto Miki 45+1' | Stadium: Naihati Stadium; Attendance: 3,786; Referee: Anand Rana; Man of the Match: Daniel Gonçalves(Shillong Lajong) |

| 9 November 2023 2 | Shillong Lajong | 1–1 | NEROCA | Shillong |
| 14:00 IST | Daniel Gonçalves 34' | Report | Fabian Reid 79' | Stadium: SSA Stadium; Attendance: 5,585; Referee: Lakshay; Man of the Match: Renan Paulino (Shillong) |

| 14 November 2023 3 | Shillong Lajong | 2–2 | Sreenidi Deccan | Shillong |
| 14:00 IST | Ronnie Kharbudon 28'; Takuto Miki 34' | Report | Rosenberg Gabriel 7', 63' | Stadium: SSA Stadium; Attendance: 5,248; Referee: Jehrul Islam; Man of the Match: Rosenberg Gabriel |

| 19 November 2023 4 | Shillong Lajong | 3–1 | Gokulam Kerala | Shillong |
| 14:00 IST | Daniel Gonçalves 29'; Renan Paulino 75' (pen.); Hardy Nongbri 90+7' | Report | Nili Perdomo 43' | Stadium: SSA Stadium; Attendance: 5,987; Referee: Surojit Das; Man of the Match: Hardy Nongbri (Shillong Lajong) |

| 22 November 2023 5 | Shillong Lajong | 2–1 | Delhi | Shillong |
| 16.30 IST | Abdou Karim 24'; Phrangki Buam 82' | Report | Gaurav Rawat 60' | Stadium: SSA Stadium; Attendance: 6,425; Referee: Williams Joy Koshy; Man of the Match: Phrangki Buam (Shillong) |

| 25 November 2023 6 | Shillong Lajong | 2–1 | TRAU | Shillong |
| 16.30 IST | Hardy Nongbri 18' (pen.); Thounaojam Thomas 86' (o.g.) | Report | Soraisam Robinson Singh 13' | Stadium: SSA Stadium; Attendance: 6,718; Referee: Ashish Tiwari; Man of the Match: Hardy Nongbri (Shillong) |

| 3 December 2023 7 | Rajasthan United | 1–1 | Shillong Lajong | Hyderabad |
| 16.30 IST | Richardson Denzell 10' | Report | Daniel Gonçalves 90+5' | Stadium: Deccan Arena; Man of the Match: Ibrahim Morro (Rajasthan) |

| 6 December 2023 8 | Shillong Lajong | 2–0 | Churchill Brothers | Shillong |
| 19:00 IST | Laiwang Bohham 45+1'; Renan Paulino 51' (pen.) | Report | | Stadium: SSA Stadium; Attendance: 6,115; Referee: Anand Rana |

| 10 December 2023 9 | Shillong Lajong | 0–3 | Aizawl | Shillong |
| 14:00 IST | | Report | Lalrinzuala Lalbiaknia 5'; Tharpuia 17'; Joe Zoherliana 57' | Stadium: SSA Stadium; Attendance: 7,438; Referee: Ashish Tiwari |

| 16 December 2023 10 | Real Kashmir | 3–1 | Shillong Lajong | Srinagar |
| 14:00 IST | Kamal Isaah 5'; Gnohere Krizo 55'; Mohammad Inam 69' | Report | Abdou Karim Samb 16' | Stadium: TRC Turf Ground; Man of the Match: Mohammad Inam (Real Kashmir) |

| 23 December 2023 11 | Shillong Lajong | 3–0 | Namdhari | Shillong |
| 19:00 IST | Abdou Karim Samb 27'; Renan Paulino 54'; Kenstar Kharshong 90+8' | | | Stadium: SSA Stadium; Attendance: 4,891; Referee: Joyshing Monsang Thumli |

| 4 February 2024 12 | Shillong Lajong | 0–1 | Inter Kashi | Shillong |
| 19:00 IST | | | Gianni dos Santos 23' | Stadium: SSA Stadium; Attendance: 5,812; Referee: Jehrul Islam |

| 9 February 2024 13 | Gokulam Kerala | 2–0 | Shillong Lajong | Kozhikode |
| 19:00 IST | Sourav K 45+4'; Matija Babović 72' | Report | | Stadium: EMS Stadium; Attendance: 2,500; Referee: Williams Joy Koshiy; Man of the Match: Sourav K (Gokulam Kerala) |

| 18 February 2024 14 | NEROCA | 0–2 | Shillong Lajong | Shillong |
| 16.30 IST | | | Kynsaibor Lhuid 52', 62' | Stadium: SSA Stadium; Man of the Match: Kynsaibor Lhuid (Shillong Lajong) |

| 25 February 2024 15 | TRAU | 1–2 | Shillong Lajong | Imphal |
| 19:00 IST | Issahak Nuhu Seidu 47' | Report | Allen Lyngdoh 59'; Marcos Silva 72' | Stadium: Khuman Lampak Main Stadium; Attendance: 259; Referee: Suresh Devaraj; Man of the Match: Manash Gogoi (TRAU) |

| 28 February 2024 16 | Shillong Lajong | 4–4 | Rajasthan United | Shillong |
| 19:00 IST | Kynsaibor Lhuid 24'; Douglas Tardin 45+3' (pen.); Daniel Goncalves 80'; Phrangki Buam 85' | Report | Naoba Meitei 12'; Ragav Gupta 51'; Richardson Denzell 90+3'; Lalchungnunga Chhangte 90+5' | Stadium: SSA Stadium; Attendance: 6,617; Referee: Surojit Das; Man of the Match: Daniel Goncalves (Shillong Lajong) |

| 4 March 2024 17 | Churchill Brothers | 2–1 | Shillong Lajong | Vasco |
| 19:00 IST | Stendly Fernandes 15'; Martín Cháves 80' | | Phrangki Buam 42' | Stadium: Tilak Maidan |

| 9 March 2024 18 | Aizawl | 1–2 | Shillong Lajong | Aizawl |
| 19:00 IST | Lalrinzuala Lalbiaknia 81' (pen.) | Report | Phrangki Buam 27'; Damaitphang Lyngdoh 90+4' | Stadium: Rajiv Gandhi Stadium; Attendance: 2,056; Referee: Surojit Das; Man of the Match: Phrangki Buam (Shillong Lajong) |

| 13 March 2024 19 | Shillong Lajong | 1–1 | Real Kashmir | Shillong |
| 19:00 IST | Renan Paulino 90+7' | Report | Adnan Ayub 11' | Stadium: SSA Stadium; Attendance: 7,151; Referee: Akashkumar Mehta; Man of the Match: Adnan Ayub (Real Kashmir) |

| 16 March 2024 20 | Namdhari | 1-1 | Shillong Lajong | Bhaini Ala |
| 14:00 IST | | | | Stadium: Namdhari Stadium |

| 22 March 2024 21 | Inter Kashi | 2–1 | Shillong Lajong | Kalyani |
| 19:00 IST | Barco 32'; Tejas Krishna 45' | Report | Paulino 55' (pen.) | Stadium: Kalyani Stadium; Attendance: 232; Referee: Pratik Mondal; Man of the Match: Arindam Bhattacharya (Inter Kashi) |

| 28 March 2024 22 | Delhi | 3–1 | Shillong Lajong | Bhaini Ala |
| 15:30 IST | Barboza 65' (pen.), 75', 90+3' | Report | Lyngdoh 90+5' | Stadium: Namdhari Stadium; Attendance: 200; Referee: Mrutyunjay Amatya; Man of the Match: Sérgio Barboza (Delhi) |

| 6 April 2024 23 | Shillong Lajong | 1–2 | Mohammedan | Shillong |
| 19:00 IST | Tardin 15' (pen.) | Report | Gómez 1'; Kozlov 63' | Stadium: SSA Stadium; Attendance: 7,816; Referee: Senthil Nathan S. Man of the Match: Padam Chettri (Mohammedan) |

| 13 April 2024 24 | Sreenidi Deccan | 3–2 | Shillong Lajong | Hyderabad |
| 18:00 IST | Alves 4'; Gabriel 16'; Castañeda 84' (pen.) | Report | Buam 46', 87' | Stadium: Deccan Arena; Attendance: 190; Referee: Williams Joy Koshy; Man of the Match: Mayakkannan (Sreenidi Deccan) |

=== Group D ===
| Pos | Team | Pld | W | D | L | GF | GA | GD | Pts | Qualification | GOA | NEU | SHI | DTH |
|---|---|---|---|---|---|---|---|---|---|---|---|---|---|---|
| 1 | Goa | 3 | 2 | 1 | 0 | 11 | 2 | +9 | 7 | Qualify for the knockout stage | — | — | 6–0 | 3–0 |
| 2 | NorthEast United (H) | 3 | 2 | 1 | 0 | 9 | 3 | +6 | 7 | Qualify for the knockout stage | 2–2 | — | 4–0 | 3–1 |
| 3 | Shillong Lajong | 3 | 1 | 0 | 2 | 2 | 11 | −9 | 3 | | — | — | — | — |
| 4 | Downtown Heroes | 3 | 0 | 0 | 3 | 2 | 8 | −6 | 0 | | — | — | 1–2 | — |

Source: Twitter
Rules for classification: Group stage tiebreakers
(H) Hosts

==== Matches ====
| 4 August 2023 1 | NorthEast United | 4–0 | Shillong Lajong | Guwahati |
| 18.00 IST | Gogoi 26', 65', 70'; Philippoteaux 35' (pen.) | Report | | Stadium: Indira Gandhi Athletic Stadium; Attendance: 13,450; Referee: Senthil Nathan S Man of the Match: Parthib Gogoi (NorthEast United) |

| 8 August 2023 2 | Goa | 6–0 | Shillong Lajong | Guwahati |
| 15.00 IST | Borges 15'; Sadaoui 20', 27', 86'; Rodríguez 68'; Martínez 83' | Report | | Stadium: Indira Gandhi Athletic Stadium; Man of the Match: Noah Sadaoui (Goa) |

| 13 August 2023 3 | Downtown Heroes | 1–2 | Shillong Lajong | Kokrajhar |
| 16.45 IST | R. Kharbudon 24' (o.g.) | Report | N. Haokip (red card) 10'; R. Kharbudon 36', 52' | Stadium: SAI Stadium; Man of the Match: Ronney Kharbudon (Shillong Lajong) |

=== Group B ===
| Pos | Team | Pld | W | D | L | GF | GA | GD | Pts | Qualification | JAM | NEU | KER | SHL |
|---|---|---|---|---|---|---|---|---|---|---|---|---|---|---|
| 1 | Jamshedpur | 3 | 3 | 0 | 0 | 7 | 3 | +4 | 9 | Advance to knockout stage | — | 2–1 | 2–3 | 2–0 |
| 2 | NorthEast United | 3 | 2 | 0 | 1 | 7 | 4 | +3 | 6 | | — | — | 4–1 | 2–1 |
| 3 | Kerala Blasters | 3 | 1 | 0 | 2 | 6 | 8 | −2 | 3 | | — | — | — | 3–1 |
| 4 | Shillong Lajong | 3 | 0 | 0 | 3 | 2 | 7 | −5 | 0 | | — | — | — | — |

Source: AIFF
Rules for classification: 1) points; 2) head-to-head points; 3) head-to-head goal difference; 4) goal difference; 5) number of goals scored; 6) drawing of lots

==== Matches ====
Note: The group stage fixtures to the tournament were announced on 20 December 2023 by the AIFF.

| 10 January 2024 1 | Kerala Blasters | 3-1 | Shillong Lajong | Bhubaneswar |
| 14:00 IST | Peprah 15', 27'; Aimen 46' | | Paulino 30' (pen.) | Stadium: Kalinga Stadium Pitch 1 Man of the Match: Peprah |

| 15 January 2024 2 | NorthEast United | 2–1 | Shillong Lajong | Bhubaneswar |
| 14:00 IST | Néstor 59', 67' (pen.) | Report | Tardin 17' | Stadium: Kalinga Stadium Pitch 1 Man of the Match: Néstor Albiach (NorthEast United) |

| 20 January 2024 3 | Jamshedpur | 2–0 | Shillong Lajong | Bhubaneswar |
| 14:00 IST | Sanan 45+1'; Haokip 73' | Report | | Stadium: Kalinga Stadium Pitch 1 Man of the Match: Sanan Mohammed K (Jamshedpur) |

== Squad statistics ==
=== Goal Scorers ===
| Rank | No. | Pos. | Nat. | Name | I League | Super Cup | Durand Cup | Total |
|---|---|---|---|---|---|---|---|---|
| 1 | 95 | MF | (Brazil) | Renan Paulino | 3 | 1 | 0 | 4 |
| 2 | 3 | MF | (India) | Ronnie Kharbudon | 1 | 0 | 2 | 3 |
| 2 | 19 | MF | (Senegal) | Abdou Karim Samb | 3 | 0 | 0 | 3 |
| 2 | 20 | DF | (Brazil) | Daniel Gonçalves | 3 | 0 | 0 | 3 |
| 5 | 9 | FW | (Japan) | Takuto Miki | 2 | 0 | 0 | 2 |
| 5 | 11 | FW | (India) | Hardy Nongbri | 2 | 0 | 0 | 2 |
| 7 | 13 | MF | (India) | Laiwang Bohham | 1 | 0 | 0 | 1 |
| 7 | 16 | FW | (India) | Phrangki Buam | 1 | 0 | 0 | 1 |
| 7 | 26 | DF | (India) | Kenstar Kharshong | 1 | 0 | 0 | 1 |
| 7 | 90 | FW | (Brazil) | Douglas Tardin | 0 | 1 | 0 | 1 |
| Own Goals | | | | | 1 | 0 | 0 | 1 |
| Total | | | | | 18 | 2 | 2 | 22 |
