= Naro Hari Shrestha =

Indian footballer

Personal information
- Full name: Naro Hari Shrestha
- Date of birth: 12 May 1996 (age 30)
- Place of birth: West Bengal, India
- Height: 1.86 m (6 ft 1 in)
- Position: Striker

Team information
- Current team: Diamond Harbour
- Number: 29

Youth career
- 2014–2015: Salgaocar

Senior career*
Years	Team	Apps	(Gls)
2015–2016	Salgaocar		
2016–2017	DSK Shivajians	3	(0)
2017–2018	Mohun Bagan	4	(0)
2018	Peerless	7	(2)
2018–2019	Fateh Hyderabad	8	(3)
2019–2020	Peerless		
2020–2022	Bengaluru United	2	(0)
2022	Calcutta Customs	8	(8)
2023	ARA	8	(6)
2023	Gokulam Kerala		
2023–	Diamond Harbour	26	(15)
2025–2026	→ Sundarban Bengal Auto FC (loan)		

International career
2013–2014	India U-18		
- * Club domestic league appearances and goals as of 23:22, 19 April 2025 (UTC)

Naro Hari Shrestha (born 12 May 1996) is an Indian professional footballer who plays as a forward for I-League club Diamond Harbour.

== Career ==
=== Youth career ===
Born in West Bengal, Shrestha represented his state in the Santosh Trophy. Shrestha started his youth career playing for India U-18 Elite Academy. He then signed a two-year contract with Salgaocar in 2014. He played a crucial role in Salgaocar junior teams various title victories. Soon the following year Shrestha joined Salgaocar F.C Senior team.

=== Senior career ===
Shrestha began his senior career with Salgaocar. He played for the club in the Goa Professional League. After the Pro League season, he signed with I-League club DSK Shivajians. Shrestha started his DSK Shivajians career by helping his side win the DSK Cup and in the process he became the Golden Boot winner of the tournament. He also played the PDFA Pune Super League 2017 scoring 9 goals in 5 matches in which DSK Shivajians gained comfortable victories over their rival teams.

He made his I-League debut for the club on 11 February 2017 against Shillong Lajong. He came on as an 86th-minute substitute for Kim Song-Yong as DSK Shivajians won 2–1.

In 2020, he moved to FC Bengaluru United and won the 2021–22 Bangalore Super Division title.

In 2022, he represented West Bengal football team at the 36th National Games of India in Gujarat, in which they clinched gold defeating Kerala 5–0 in final. In 2024 he joined Bengal Club Diamond Harbour under I-league winer coach Coach Kibu Vicuna.

Club	Season	League			Cup		AFC		Total	
Club	Season	Division	Apps	Goals	Apps	Goals	Apps	Goals	Apps	Goals
DSK Shivajians	2016–17	I-League	3	0	0	0	—		3	0
Mohun Bagan	2017–18	I-League	4	0	0	0	—		4	0
Peerless	2018	Calcutta Football League	7	2	0	0	—		7	0
Fateh Hyderabad	2018–19	I-League 2nd Division	8	3	0	0	—		8	3
Bengaluru United	2020	I-League 2nd Division	2	0	0	0	—		2	0
Calcutta Customs	2022	Calcutta Football League	3	3	0	0	—		3	3
ARA	2022-23	I-League 2	8	6	0	0	—		8	6
Gokulam Kerala	2023-24	I-League	0	0	1 (Note: Appearance(s) in Durand Cup)	0	—		1	0
Diamond Harbour	2024-25	I-League 3	4	4	0	0	—		4	4
Career total			35	14	1	0	0	0	36	14

== Honours ==
Bengaluru United

- Bangalore Football League: 2021–22

West Bengal

- National Games Gold medal: 2022
- Santosh Trophy: 2024–25
