= 2023–24 I-League 2 =

16th season of the I-League 2

I-League 2
- Season: 2023–24
- Dates: 20 January – 27 April 2024
- Champions: Sporting Bengaluru
- Promoted: Sporting Bengaluru; Dempo
- Relegated: Kenkre; Maharashtra Oranje
- Matches: 56
- Goals: 161 (2.88 per match)
- Top goalscorer: Thomyo L Shimray; Sahil Harijan (11 goals)
- Biggest home win: Maharashtra Oranje 3-0 Sudeva Delhi (1 Feb 2024); Bengaluru United 3-0 Sudeva Delhi (12 Feb 2024); Dempo 4-1 Maharashtra Oranje (30 Mar 2024); Sporting Bengaluru 3-0 Dempo (6 Apr 2024); Maharashtra Oranje 3-0 Sporting Goa (14 Apr 2024)
- Biggest away win: Kenkre 0-4 Dempo (15 Apr 2024); Kenkre 0-4 Sporting Bengaluru (21 Apr 2024)
- Highest scoring: Kenkre 3-5 Sudeva Delhi (11 Apr 2024); United 5-3 Bengaluru United (14 Apr 2024)
- Longest winning run: 7 matches Sporting Bengaluru
- Longest unbeaten run: 7 matches Sporting Bengaluru
- Longest winless run: 7 matches Maharashtra Oranje
- Longest losing run: 6 matches Maharashtra Oranje
- Highest attendance: 1,235; Sporting Bengaluru 1–0 Sporting Goa (24 Mar 2024)
- Lowest attendance: 10; Bengaluru United 1-2 Dempo (3 Apr 2024)
- Total attendance: 11,798
- Average attendance: 210

2023–24 I-League 2 was the 16th season of the I-League 2 since its establishment in 2008. It was also the 2nd season as the third tier of the Indian football league system. The top two clubs on the league table will secure a place in the 2024–25 I-League season.

This was the first edition where the clubs have been reinstated from the previous season, after approval from the league committee on 13 January 2023.

== Changes from last season ==
=== Teams ===
==== Promotion from 2023–24 I-League 3 ====
- Sporting Goa ▲
- Dempo ▲
- Sporting Bengaluru ▲

==== Reinstatement from 2022–23 I-League 2 Final Round ====
- Ambernath United Atlanta (now, Maharashtra Oranje)
- Bengaluru United
- United

==== Relegation from 2022–23 I-League ====
- Kenkre ▼
- Sudeva Delhi ▼

==== Promotion to 2023–24 I-League ====
- Delhi ▲
- Shillong Lajong ▲

With the introduction of the 4th tier I-League 3, the teams participating in I-League 2 have been reduced to 8.

== Clubs ==
- Clubs relegated from 2022–23 I-League enter I-League 2.
- Clubs not promoted to 2023–24 I-League in the previous season are reinstated.
- Clubs promoted from 2023–24 I-League 3 enter I-League 2.

=== 2023–24 I-League 2 clubs ===
Locations of I-League 2 clubs

| Club | State | City | Stadium | Capacity |
|---|---|---|---|---|
| United | West Bengal | Kalyani | Kalyani Stadium | 20,000 |
| Maharashtra Oranje | Maharashtra | Mumbai | COE Kharghar | 5,000 |
| Kenkre | Maharashtra | Mumbai | COE Kharghar | 5,000 |
| Sudeva Delhi | Delhi | New Delhi | Ambedkar Stadium | 15,000 |
| Bengaluru United | Karnataka | Bengaluru | Padukone & Dravid COE | 250 |
| Sporting Bengaluru | Karnataka | Bengaluru | Bangalore Football Stadium | 8,400 |
| Sporting Goa | Goa | Panaji | Tilak Maidan | 5,000 |
| Dempo | Goa | Panaji | Ella Ground | 500 |

=== Personnel and sponsorship ===
| Team | Head coach | Captain | Kit manufacturer | Shirt sponsor |
|---|---|---|---|---|
| Bengaluru United | (Spain) Fernando Varela | (India) Faiz Khan | (India) HYVE | NIMIDA |
| Dempo | (India) Samir Naik | (India) Ariston Costa | (India) Shiv-Naresh | Dempo |
| Maharashtra Oranje | (India) Augusto Wilson Da Silva | (India) Manish Malyadri Siddha | (United States) KING | AWSCA |
| Kenkre | (India) Akhil Kothari | (India) Raul Almeida | (Germany) Hummel | Kenkre Sports Foundation |
| Sporting Bengaluru | (India) Chinta Chandrashekar Rao | (India) Manoj Swamy Kannan | (India) MS Sportswear | Sporting Group International |
| Sporting Goa | (India) Armando Colaco | (India) Joel Colaco | | Models |
| Sudeva Delhi | (Bhutan) Chencho Dorji | (India) Ashray Bhardwaj | (India) Shiv-Naresh | HCL |
| United | (Belgium) Steve Herbots | (India) Sanjib Mondal | (India) Trak Only | |

== League table ==
| Pos | Team | Pld | W | D | L | GF | GA | GD | Pts | Qualification |
|---|---|---|---|---|---|---|---|---|---|---|
| 1 | Sporting Bengaluru (C) | 14 | 11 | 0 | 3 | 28 | 12 | +16 | 33 | Promotion to I-League |
| 2 | Dempo | 14 | 8 | 3 | 3 | 21 | 13 | +8 | 27 | Promotion to I-League |
| 3 | Sudeva Delhi | 14 | 7 | 2 | 5 | 17 | 19 | −2 | 23 | |
| 4 | Bengaluru United | 14 | 6 | 2 | 6 | 21 | 19 | +2 | 20 | |
| 5 | Sporting Goa | 14 | 6 | 1 | 7 | 19 | 18 | +1 | 19 | |
| 6 | United | 14 | 4 | 3 | 7 | 18 | 21 | −3 | 15 | |
| 7 | Maharashtra Oranje | 14 | 4 | 3 | 7 | 20 | 25 | −5 | 15 | Relegation to I-League 3 |
| 8 | Kenkre | 14 | 3 | 0 | 11 | 17 | 34 | −17 | 9 | Relegation to I-League 3 |

Source: I-League 2 AIFF
Rules for classification: 1) points; 2) head-to-head points; 3) head-to-head goal difference; 4) head-to-head goals scored; 5) goal difference; 6) number of goals scored; 7) fair play ranking; 8) drawing of lots
(C) Champions

== Results ==
=== Fixtures and results ===
| Home \ Away | SCB | DEM | SUD | BEN | SCG | USC | MAO | KEN |
|---|---|---|---|---|---|---|---|---|
| Sporting Bengaluru | — | 3–0 | 2–1 | 2–0 | 1–0 | 3–1 | 2–1 | 4–3 |
| Dempo | 1–0 | — | 3–1 | 0–1 | 2–1 | 1–1 | 4–1 | 0–2 |
| Sudeva Delhi | 0–1 | 0–0 | — | 1–0 | 1–0 | 1–0 | 3–2 | 2–1 |
| Bengaluru United | 0–1 | 1–2 | 3–0 | — | 1–0 | 2–2 | 2–1 | 4–2 |
| Sporting Goa | 4–3 | 0–1 | 1–1 | 1–0 | — | 1–2 | 2–0 | 2–1 |
| United | 1–0 | 0–1 | 0–1 | 5–3 | 0–2 | — | 1–1 | 0–1 |
| Maharashtra Oranje | 0–2 | 2–2 | 3–0 | 2–2 | 3–0 | 2–5 | — | 1–0 |
| Kenkre | 0–4 | 0–4 | 3–5 | 0–2 | 2–5 | 2–0 | 0–1 | — |

Updated to match(es) played on 27 April 2024. Source: I-League
Legend: Blue = home team win; Yellow = draw; Red = away team win.

=== Results by games ===
| Team ╲ Round | 1 | 2 | 3 | 4 | 5 | 6 | 7 | 8 | 9 | 10 | 11 | 12 | 13 | 14 |
|---|---|---|---|---|---|---|---|---|---|---|---|---|---|---|
| Maharashtra Oranje | D | L | W | W | L | L | L | L | L | L | D | W | D | W |
| Bengaluru United | W | W | W | L | D | W | W | W | L | L | D | L | L | L |
| United | W | L | L | L | D | W | L | L | L | L | D | W | D | W |
| Kenkre | L | L | W | L | W | L | L | L | L | W | L | L | L | L |
| Sudeva Delhi | D | W | L | L | L | W | D | W | W | W | W | L | W | L |
| Sporting Goa | D | W | L | W | W | L | L | L | W | W | W | L | L | L |
| Dempo | D | L | W | L | W | W | D | W | W | L | D | W | W | W |
| Sporting Bengaluru | L | W | L | W | W | W | W | W | W | W | L | W | W | W |

Updated to match(es) played on 27 Apr 2024. Source: I-League
W = Win; D = Draw; L = Lose

== Statistics ==
=== Top scorers ===
As of 27 April 2024

| Rank | Player | Club | Goals |
|---|---|---|---|
| 1 | (India) Thomyo L Shimray | Sporting Bengaluru | 11 |
| 1 | (India) Sahil Harijan | United | 11 |
| 3 | (India) Sanchit Singh | Maharashtra Oranje | 9 |
| 4 | (India) Alister Anthony | Sporting Goa | 8 |
| 5 | (India) Ramesh Chhetri | Sudeva Delhi | 5 |

=== Hat-tricks ===
| Player | For | Against | Result | Date | Ref |
|---|---|---|---|---|---|
| (India) Sahil Harijan | United | Maharashtra Oranje | 5–2 (A) | 12 February 2024 | |
| (India) Alister Anthony | Sporting Goa | Kenkre | 5–2 (A) | 2 April 2024 | |
| (India) Thomyo L Shimray | Sporting Bengaluru | Kenkre | 4–0 (A) | 21 April 2024 | |

=== Clean sheets ===
As of 27 April 2024

| Rank | Player | Club | Clean sheets |
|---|---|---|---|
| 1 | (India) Ashish Sibi | Sudeva Delhi | 5 |
| 2 | (India) Vishal Joon | Bengaluru United | 4 |
| 2 | (India) Satyajit Bordoloi | Sporting Bengaluru | 4 |
| 2 | (India) Mukunthan Ravi Kumar | Maharashtra Oranje | 4 |
| 5 | (India) Niraj Kumar | Sporting Bengaluru | 3 |
| 5 | (India) Dylan D'Silva | Sporting Goa | 3 |
| 5 | (India) Harsh Rajesh Patil | Kenkre | 3 |
| 5 | (India) Sangramjit Roy Chowdhury | Dempo | 3 |
| 9 | (India) Wellyster Mendes | Dempo | 2 |
| 10 | (India) Suvam Sen | United SC | 1 |

== Broadcast ==
Home games of Maharashtra Oranje are broadcast by SportsCast India while all games of Sporting Goa and Dempo are broadcast by SportsKPI on their respective official YouTube channels.

| Club | Broadcaster | Reference |
|---|---|---|
| Maharashtra Oranje | SportsCast India | |
| Sporting Goa | SportsKPI | |
| Dempo | SportsKPI | |

== Attendances ==
=== Overall statistical table ===
| Pos | Team | Total | High | Low | Average | Change |
|---|---|---|---|---|---|---|
| 1 | Sporting Bengaluru | 3,412 | 1,235 | 50 | 487 | n/a^{††} |
| 2 | Sporting Goa | 1,900 | 500 | 50 | 271 | n/a^{††} |
| 3 | Sudeva Delhi | 1,805 | 500 | 100 | 257 | −68.3%^{†} |
| 4 | United | 1,606 | 500 | 26 | 229 | −53.0% |
| 5 | Dempo | 1,195 | 350 | 50 | 170 | +6.3% |
| 6 | Maharashtra Oranje | 855 | 250 | 50 | 122 | −89.5% |
| 7 | Bengaluru United | 615 | 245 | 10 | 87 | −65.1% |
| 8 | Kenkre | 410 | 100 | 40 | 58 | −94.6%^{†} |
| | League total | 11,798 | 1,235 | 10 | 210 | −55.8% |

Notes:
^{†} Kenkre and Sudeva Delhi played in the I-League in the 2022–23 season.
^{††} Attendance count for Sporting Goa and Sporting Bengaluru starts from this season.

==== Attendances by home matches ====
| Team \ Match played | 1 | 2 | 3 | 4 | 5 | 6 | 7 | Total |
|---|---|---|---|---|---|---|---|---|
| Sporting Bengaluru | 400 | 400 | 400 | 527 | 1,235 | 400 | 50 | 3,412 |
| Sporting Goa | 400 | 120 | 50 | 280 | 250 | 500 | 300 | 1,900 |
| Sudeva Delhi | 100 | 500 | 125 | 350 | 200 | 300 | 230 | 1,805 |
| United | 500 | 300 | 300 | 300 | 50 | 26 | 130 | 1,606 |
| Dempo | 125 | 150 | 50 | 220 | 200 | 100 | 350 | 1,195 |
| Maharashtra Oranje | 100 | 250 | 130 | 75 | 150 | 100 | 50 | 855 |
| Bengaluru United | 125 | 100 | 50 | 45 | 40 | 10 | 245 | 615 |
| Kenkre | 50 | 65 | 100 | 60 | 40 | 45 | 50 | 410 |

Legend: Highest Lowest
Updated to game(s) played on 27 April 2024
Source: I-League.org

== See also ==
- Men
  - 2023–24 Indian Super League (Tier I)
  - 2023–24 I-League (Tier II)
  - 2023–24 I-League 3 (Tier IV)
  - 2023–24 Indian State Leagues (Tier V)
  - 2024 Super Cup
  - 2023 Durand Cup
  - 2024 Reliance Foundation Development League
- Women
  - 2023–24 Indian Women's League
  - 2023–24 Indian Women's League 2
