= 2022–23 I-League 2nd Division =

15th season of the I-League 2

I-League 2nd Division
- Season: 2022–23
- Dates: Qualifying: 12 – 16 February; Competition proper: 13 March – 26 May
- Champions: Delhi
- Promoted: Delhi; Shillong Lajong
- Matches: 88
- Goals: 243 (2.76 per match)
- Top goalscorer: Irfan Yadwad (13 goals)
- Biggest home win: Bengaluru United 5–0 Chennaiyin (R) (14 April); East Bengal (R) 5–0 The Diamond Rock (23 April); Shillong Lajong 5–0 East Bengal (R) (29 April)
- Biggest away win: Chennaiyin (R) 0–5 Bengaluru United (31 March); Mumbai City (R) 0–5 Delhi (9 April)
- Highest scoring: United 4–3 Ambernath United Atlanta (21 May)
- Longest winless run: 8 matches Mumbai City (R)
- Longest losing run: 6 matches The Diamond Rock
- Highest attendance: 5,275; Shillong Lajong 2–1 Bengaluru United (21 May)
- Lowest attendance: 25; Chennaiyin (R) 2–1 RKM FA (10 April)
- Total attendance: 39,800
- Average attendance: 452

2022–23 Hero I-League 2nd Division (known as Hero 2022–23 2nd Division League) was the 15th season of the I-League 2nd Division since its establishment in 2008. This was the first season of I-League 2nd Division since rebranding as the third tier of Indian football league system. The league's group stage has been played from March to May 2023, parallel to the remaining part of both I-League and Indian Super League seasons. The top two teams on the league table, Delhi and Shillong Lajong, secured a place in the 2023–24 I-League season.

On 27 September 2022, the league committee meeting presided by Lalnghinglova Hmar was held. It was initially decided that 15 teams would participate in the upcoming season, including the reserve sides of ISL teams. The final phase of the league will be played on a home-and-away basis.

However, on 16 December, the league committee decided that 20 teams would play in I-League 2, consisting of 12 state league champions along with 6 ISL reserve sides and two qualification tournament winners.

On 13 January, the League committee decided that two clubs would be promoted to I-League, and two relegated clubs, along with the remaining three final-round clubs, would directly qualify for the final round of next season.

== Changes from last season ==
- The league will have state league champions or other eligible teams nominated by their respective state football associations besides the six reserve teams of the Indian Super League.
- Teams will be divided into zones to minimize the travel, and the winners from each zone will qualify for the final phase.
- The final round will be played on a home and away basis, consisting of 5 teams.
- The two among five teams who finish at the top of the table after the final phase is promoted to the l-League.
- The two relegated I-League teams and the other three final phase teams will directly qualify for the I-League 2 final phase next season.
- Mandatory club licensing criteria are removed for participating in the league.

== Qualification ==
=== Selection criteria ===
1. State association can nominate the state league champions or other clubs based on the conducted state leagues in the previous season.
2. State association can also nominate other clubs for the qualifier tournament without the state league.
3. Nominated institutional clubs are ineligible for participation in the league.

=== Teams selection through state leagues ===
As per AIFF, teams will be selected to participate in I-League 2 through state leagues nominations. Only the top-qualified team can be nominated from the state league. KLASA FC was the champions of the Manipur state league, but the All Manipur Football Association didn't nominate it but instead nominated the 5th position KIYC. AIFF decided not to allow any club from Manipur in the competition. The following clubs were confirmed by their state football associations for the 2022–23 season of I-League 2.

No.	State	Qualifying tournament		Selected	City	Position
No.	State	Name	Season	Selected	City	Position
1	Chhattisgarh	Chhattisgarh State Men's Football League Championship	2021–22	RKM FA	Narainpur	Champions
2	Delhi	Delhi Football League	2021–22	Delhi FC	New Delhi	Champions
3	Goa	Goa Professional League	2021–22	Dempo SC	Panjim	Champions
4	Gujarat	Gujarat SFA Club Championship	2021–22	ARA FC	Ahmedabad	Runners-up
5	Himachal Pradesh	Himachal Football League	2022	Techtro Swades United FC	Una	Champions
6	Karnataka	Bangalore Football League	2021–22	FC Bengaluru United	Bengaluru	Champions
7	Kerala	Kerala Premier League	2021–22	Golden Threads FC	Kochi	Champions
8	Madhya Pradesh	Madhya Pradesh Premier League	2021–22	The Diamond Rock FC	Balaghat	3rd place
9	Maharashtra	Mumbai Football League	2021–22	Ambernath United Atlanta FC	Ambernath	Champions
10	Punjab	Punjab State Super Football League	2021–22	Jagat Singh Palahi FC	Phagwara	3rd place
11	West Bengal	Calcutta Football League	2021–22	United SC	Kolkata	Semi-finalist

The following clubs were not allowed to participate by the state football associations for the 2022–23 season of I-League 2.

No.	State	Qualifying tournament		Selected	City	Position
No.	State	Name	Season	Selected	City	Position
1	Manipur	Manipur State League	2021–22	KLASA FC	Bishnupur	Champions

=== Reserve teams ===
The reserve teams of the 6 Indian Super League clubs will participate. However, they would not be eligible for promotion.

No.	Club	City	State
1	Bengaluru FC Reserves	Bengaluru	Karnataka
2	Chennaiyin FC Reserves	Chennai	Tamil Nadu
3	East Bengal Club Reserves	Kolkata	West Bengal
4	FC Goa Reserves	Margao	Goa
5	Hyderabad FC Reserves	Hyderabad	Telangana
6	Mumbai City FC Reserves	Mumbai	Maharashtra

=== Qualification tournament ===
The states that did not conduct their leagues in the previous season nominated respective clubs to participate in the qualification tournament. The top 2 teams qualified for I-league 2.

No	Teams Selected	City	State
1	Corbett	Rudrapur	Uttarakhand
2	Downtown Heroes	Srinagar	Jammu and Kashmir
3	Shillong Lajong	Shillong	Meghalaya
4	United Chirang Duar	Kokrajhar	Assam

=== Qualifier group ===
Pos	Team	Pld	W	D	L	GF	GA	GD	Pts	Qualification	SHL	DTH	UCD	COR
1	Shillong Lajong	3	2	1	0	9	2	+7	7	Group stage	—	1–1	6–1	—
2	Downtown Heroes	3	2	1	0	8	3	+5	7	Group stage	—	—	—	2–1
3	United Chirang Duar	3	1	0	2	4	12	−8	3		—	1–5	—	2–1
4	Corbett	3	0	0	3	2	6	−4	0		0–2	—	—	—

Source: AIFF
Rules for classification: 1) points; 2) head-to-head points; 3) head-to-head goal difference; 4) goal difference; 5) number of goals scored; 6) drawing of lots

12 February 2023	Corbett	0–2	Shillong Lajong	Kokrajhar, Assam
10:00 IST	Sarkar (yellow card) 36'	Report	Lepcha 37', 77'; Wahlang (yellow card) 45+3' (yellow-red card) 75'; Nongbri (yellow card) 66'	Stadium: SAI STC Ground; Attendance: 100; Referee: Simanta Kahar; Man of the Match: Amon Lepcha (Shillong Lajong)

12 February 2023	United Chirang Duar	1–5	Downtown Heroes	Kokrajhar, Assam
14:00 IST	Hazowary (yellow card) 37'; Lalbiakdika 90+4'	Report	Bhuiya 3'; Dar 26', 62', 68', 83'; Tariq (yellow card) 40'; Hilal Dar (yellow card) 65'; Yousif (yellow card) 77'	Stadium: SAI STC Ground; Attendance: 250; Referee: Thomas Melbin Parappalliyil; Man of the Match: Ateeb Ahmed Dar (Downtown Heroes)

14 February 2023	Shillong Lajong	6–1	United Chirang Duar	Kokrajhar, Assam
10:00 IST	Kharsahnoh 4'; Tariang 27'; Nongbri 31', 81' (yellow card) 81'; Lepcha (yellow card) 45+3'; Shianglong 84'; Marngar 90'	Report	Basumatary 20' (yellow card) 71'	Stadium: SAI STC Ground; Attendance: 100; Referee: A Arun Chakkaravarthi; Man of the Match: Sangti Janai Shianglong (Shillong Lajong)

14 February 2023	Downtown Heroes	2–1	Corbett	Kokrajhar, Assam
14:00 IST	Terang (yellow card) 13'; Manisana Singh 50'; Yousuf (yellow card) 63'; Dar 85'	Report	Mehra (yellow card) 12'; Oraon 16'; Nomuk (yellow card) 55'; Rafi (yellow card) 75'	Stadium: SAI STC Ground; Attendance: 100; Referee: Dipak Singha; Man of the Match: Ateeb Ahmed Dar (Downtown Heroes)

16 February 2023	Shillong Lajong	1–1	Downtown Heroes	Kokrajhar, Assam
10:00 IST	Chhetri (yellow card) 12'; Kharsahnoh 51'	Report	Yousif 12'; Yousuf (yellow card) 32'; Manisana Singh (yellow card) 35'; Bhuiya (yellow card) 43'; Tariq (yellow card) 55'; Terang (yellow card) 90+5'	Stadium: SAI STC Ground; Attendance: 50; Referee: A Arun Chakkaravarthi; Man of the Match: Sambor Oneel Kharsahnoh (Shillong Lajong)

16 February 2023	United Chirang Duar	2–1	Corbett	Kokrajhar, Assam
14:00 IST	Lalbiakdika 74', 86'	Report	Ghogale 76'; Negi (yellow card) 84'	Stadium: SAI STC Ground; Attendance: 150; Referee: Dipak Singha; Man of the Match: Lalbiakdika (United Chirang Duar)

== Clubs ==
=== Stadiums and locations ===
Locations of current I-League 2 clubs

Club	State/UT	City	Stadium	Capacity
ARA	Gujarat	Ahmedabad	Shahibaug Police Stadium	20,000
Ambernath United Atlanta	Maharashtra	Mumbai	Cooperage Ground	5,000
Delhi	Delhi	Delhi	Minerva Academy Ground	
Dempo	Goa	Panjim	Dempo Academy Ground	3,000
Downtown Heroes	Jammu & Kashmir	Srinagar	TRC Turf Ground	11,000
Bengaluru United	Karnataka	Bengaluru	Bangalore Football Stadium	8,400
Golden Threads	Kerala	Kochi	Panampally Ground	2,500
Jagat Singh Palahi	Punjab	Phagwara	Hargobind Stadium	
RKM FA	Chhattisgarh	Narainpur	Ramakrishna Mission Sports Complex	
Shillong Lajong	Meghalaya	Shillong	SSA Stadium	5,000
Techtro Swades United	Himachal Pradesh	Una	Minerva Academy Ground	
The Diamond Rock	Madhya Pradesh	Balaghat	Mulna Stadium	15,000
United	West Bengal	Kalyani	Kalyani Stadium	20,000
Bengaluru (R)	Karnataka	Bengaluru	Bangalore Football Stadium	8,400
Chennaiyin (R)	Tamil Nadu	Chennai	SSN College Ground	
East Bengal (R)	West Bengal	Kolkata	Naihati Stadium	25,000
Goa (R)	Goa	Margao	Nagoa Football Ground	
Hyderabad (R)	Telangana	Hyderabad	Bangalore Football Stadium	8,400
Mumbai City (R)	Maharashtra	Mumbai	Cooperage Ground	5,000

=== Personnel and kits ===
Team	Manager	Captain	Kit manufacturer	Shirt sponsor
ARA	(India) Vivek Nagul	(India) Naro Hari Shrestha	SEVEN	Amul
Ambernath United Atlanta	(India) Steven Dias	(India) Himanshu Patil		Ambernath United Atlanta
Delhi	(India) Surinder Singh	(India) Gurtej Singh	Astro	Colordesign India
Dempo	(India) Samir Naik	(India) Shallum Pires	Shiv Naresh	Dempo
Downtown Heroes	(India) Hilal Rasool Parray	(India) Zubair Ahad Akhoon	Chinar	J&K Bank
Bengaluru United	(Spain) Fernando Varela	(India) Sushil Meitei	Hummel	NIMIDA
Golden Threads	(India) Samuel Geevarghese	(India) Bibake Thapa	Nivia	Wayna
Jagat Singh Palahi	(India) Sukhwinder Kumar	(India) Shamsher Singh Mahala	JB Sports	JSP Football Academy
RKM FA	(India) Jahar Das	(India) Suresh Kumar Dhruv	Nivia	
Shillong Lajong	(India) Bobby Nongbet	(India) Atlanson Kharmaw	Nivia	
Techtro Swades United	(India) Vipin Thapa	(India) Janio Fernandas	King	
The Diamond Rock	(India) Chandan Rathod	(India) Sujit Hansda	Nivia	Apollo Tyres
United	(Belgium) Steve Herbots	(India) Sanjib Mondal	Trak Only	
Bengaluru (R)	(India) Kaizad Ambapardiwala	(India) Harmanpreet Singh (India) Lara Sharma	Puma	JSW
Chennaiyin (R)	(India) Cleofas Alex	(India) Aqib Nawab	Nivia	
East Bengal (R)	(India) Bino George	(India) Sanjib Ghosh	Trak Only	Emami
Goa (R)	(India) Sugitesh Mandrekar	(India) Mevan Dias	T10 Sports	Parimatch News
Hyderabad (R)	(India) Renjith Ajithkumar	(India) Mark Zothanpuia	Hummel	Stake News
Mumbai City (R)	(India) Anthony Fernandes	(India) Ahan Prakash	Puma	

== Group stage ==
6 Indian Super League reserve sides play in this round, along with 12 state champions and two state qualification tournament winners.

Twenty teams are divided into four groups of 5, where each team plays each other twice in a home and away format. Each group winner along with the best second placed team qualify for the final round.

=== Group A ===
Pos	Team	Pld	W	D	L	GF	GA	GD	Pts	Qualification	DEL	DTH	JSP	TSU	MCI
1	Delhi	8	5	1	2	20	5	+15	16	Advance to Final round	—	3–0	2–0	0–1	4–0
2	Downtown Heroes	8	4	2	2	7	5	+2	14		1–1	—	1–0	1–0	0–0
3	Jagat Singh Palahi	8	4	1	3	10	9	+1	13		2–1	1–0	—	0–1	3–3
4	Techtro Swades United	8	4	0	4	9	8	+1	12		1–4	0–2	0–1	—	2–0
5	Mumbai City (R)	8	0	2	6	4	23	−19	2		0–5	0–2	1–3	0–4	—

Source: AIFF

13 March 2023 1	Delhi	0–1	Techtro Swades United	Mohali, Punjab
15.30 IST	Bhandari (yellow card) 17'	Report	Thakur 12'; Rakshit (yellow card) 50'	Stadium: Minerva Academy Ground; Attendance: 150; Referee: Diwakar Kumar; Man of the Match: Hemant Thakur (Techtro Swades United)

13 March 2023 2	Jagat Singh Palahi	1–0	Downtown Heroes	Phagwara, Punjab
15.30 IST	Singh (yellow card) 30'; Ishwar (yellow card) 59'; Bhattarai 90+3'	Report		Stadium: Hargobind Stadium; Attendance: 500; Referee: Vishal; Man of the Match: Shamsher Singh Mahala (Jagat Singh Palahi)

17 March 2023 3	Delhi	3–0	Downtown Heroes	Mohali, Punjab
15.30 IST	Rawat 6' (yellow card) 49'; Bisht 56'; Inam 78'	Report	Nazir (yellow card) 59'	Stadium: Minerva Academy Ground; Attendance: 60; Referee: Jatinder Singh; Man of the Match: Gaurav Rawat (Delhi)

17 March 2023 4	Jagat Singh Palahi	3–3	Mumbai City (R)	Phagwara, Punjab
15.30 IST	Bahadur Singh 20'; Rattu 56'; Slathia 58'	Report	Chhikara 32', 52'; Asif 83'	Stadium: Hargobind Stadium; Attendance: 300; Referee: Anil Gulia; Man of the Match: Ayush Chhikara (Mumbai City (R))

21 March 2023 5	Techtro Swades United	2–0	Mumbai City (R)	Mohali, Punjab
14.30 IST	Thapa 1' (yellow card) 65'; Pariyar 78'	Report	Nikum (yellow card) 20'; Rohlupuia (yellow card) 90+4'	Stadium: Minerva Academy Ground; Attendance: 200; Referee: Vishal; Man of the Match: Ranjeet Pariyar (Techtro Swades United)

21 March 2023 6	Jagat Singh Palahi	2–1	Delhi	Phagwara, Punjab
15.30 IST	Bahadur Singh (yellow card) 23'; Goyal (yellow card) 42'; Jaiswar (yellow card) 50'; Virwani 55'; Rasheed 90+8'	Report	Vanlalhriatzuala 90+4'	Stadium: Hargobind Stadium; Attendance: 250; Referee: Rohan Das Gupta; Man of the Match: Mohammed Rasheed (Jagat Singh Palahi)

27 March 2023 7	Downtown Heroes	1–0	Techtro Swades United	Srinagar, Jammu and Kashmir
15.30 IST	Bhat (yellow card) 21'; Hilal Dar 31'; Bhuiya (yellow card) 90+4'	Report		Stadium: TRC Turf Ground; Attendance: 2,000; Referee: Aditya Purkayastha; Man of the Match: Parvaj Bhuiya (Downtown Heroes)

2 April 2023 8	Downtown Heroes	0–0	Mumbai City (R)	Srinagar, Jammu and Kashmir
15.30 IST	Pandya (yellow card) 41'; Fayaz (yellow card) 59'; Tariq (yellow card) 79'	Report		Stadium: TRC Turf Ground; Attendance: 350; Referee: Anil Gulia; Man of the Match: Ahan Prakash (Mumbai City (R))

2 April 2023 9	Techtro Swades United	0–1	Jagat Singh Palahi	Mohali, Punjab
15.30 IST	Chaudhary (yellow card) 33'	Report	Rattu 55'	Stadium: Minerva Academy Ground; Attendance: 250; Referee: Anand Rana; Man of the Match: Dinesh Choudhary (Techtro Swades United)

5 April 2023 10	Delhi	4–0	Mumbai City (R)	Mohali, Punjab
15.30 IST	Gurung 66', 90+5'; Manvir 81'; Temuri 83'	Report		Stadium: Minerva Academy Ground; Attendance: 150; Referee: Diwakar Kumar; Man of the Match: Abhay Gurung (Delhi)

7 April 2023 11	Techtro Swades United	0–2	Downtown Heroes	Mohali, Punjab
15.30 IST	Rakshit (red card) 71'	Report	Ahmed Dar 25'; Yousuf (yellow card) 35'; Pandya (yellow card) 37'; Shaikh 73' (pen.); Ahmad Dar (yellow card) 86'	Stadium: Minerva Academy Ground; Attendance: 100; Referee: Ankush Chakraborty; Man of the Match: Ateeb Ahmed Dar (Downtown Heroes)

9 April 2023 12	Mumbai City (R)	0–5	Delhi	Mumbai, Maharashtra
16.00 IST	Shaikh (yellow card) 45+2'	Report	Vanlalhriatzuala 10'; Rawat 24'; Balwant 66', 84' (pen.); Gurung 72'	Stadium: Cooperage Ground; Attendance: 523; Referee: Thomas Melbin Parappalliyil; Man of the Match: Balwant Singh (Delhi)

12 April 2023 13	Mumbai City (R)	0–2	Downtown Heroes	Mumbai, Maharashtra
16.00 IST	D'Souza (yellow card) 90+4'	Report	Ahmed Dar 44'; Shaiza 45+2'	Stadium: Cooperage Ground; Attendance: 220; Referee: Deepraj Damodar Sangelkar; Man of the Match: Parvaj Bhuiya (Downtown Heroes)

15 April 2023 14	Mumbai City (R)	1–3	Jagat Singh Palahi	Mumbai, Maharashtra
16.00 IST	Shaikh 28'	Report	Jaiswar 12'; Bahadur Singh (yellow card) 17'; Singh 24', 43'	Stadium: Cooperage Ground; Attendance: 200; Referee: Anil Gulia; Man of the Match: Balkar Singh (Jagat Singh Palahi)

15 April 2023 15	Techtro Swades United	1–4	Delhi	Mohali, Punjab
15.30 IST	Priyanshu 39'; Yadav (yellow card) 76'; Gaurab (yellow card) 79'	Report	Vanlalhriatzuala 11'; Gagandeep 17'; Balwant 45+1'; Singh 70'	Stadium: Minerva Academy Ground; Attendance: 90; Referee: Nayakappu Kurumaiah; Man of the Match: Balwant Singh (Delhi)

20 April 2023 16	Downtown Heroes	1–0	Jagat Singh Palahi	Srinagar, Jammu and Kashmir
15.30 IST	Bhuiya 64'; Tariq (yellow card) 76'; Fayaz (yellow card) 90+2'	Report	Rattu (yellow card) 35'	Stadium: TRC Turf Ground; Attendance: 50; Referee: Lakshay; Man of the Match: Parvaj Bhuiya (Downtown Heroes)

21 April 2023 17	Mumbai City (R)	0–4	Techtro Swades United	Mumbai, Maharashtra
16.00 IST		Report	Brar 45+2'; Thapa 82'; Thakur 85'; D'Souza 87' (o.g.)	Stadium: Cooperage Ground; Attendance: 200; Referee: Surojit Das; Man of the Match: Himanshu Thapa (Techtro Swades United)

24 April 2023 18	Delhi	2–0	Jagat Singh Palahi	Mohali, Punjab
15.30 IST	Kartik (yellow card) 34'; Balwant 49'; Rawat (yellow card) 54'; Fahad 76'	Report		Stadium: Minerva Academy Ground; Attendance: 240; Referee: Diwakar Kumar; Man of the Match: Balwant Singh (Delhi)

29 April 2023 19	Downtown Heroes	1–1	Delhi	Srinagar, Jammu and Kashmir
15:30 IST	Bhuiya 31' (yellow card) 31'; Yousif (yellow card) 52' (yellow-red card) 85'; Dar (yellow card) 65'	Report	Balwant (yellow card) 17' (goal) 58' (pen.); Kartik (yellow card) 44'; Inam (yellow card) 83' (yellow-red card) 90+6'; Mehra (yellow card) 89'	Stadium: TRC Turf Ground; Attendance: 300; Referee: Nayakappu Kurumaiah; Man of the Match: Parvaj Bhuiya (Downtown Heroes)

29 April 2023 20	Jagat Singh Palahi	0–1	Techtro Swades United	Phagwara, Punjab
16:00 IST	Rasheed (yellow card) 26'; Jaiswar (red card) 90+3'	Report	Thapa 10'; Singh (yellow card) 55'; Chaudhary (yellow card) 90+3'	Stadium: Hargobind Stadium; Attendance: 200; Referee: Lakshay; Man of the Match: Dinesh Choudhary (Techtro Swades United)

=== Group B ===
Pos	Team	Pld	W	D	L	GF	GA	GD	Pts	Qualification	USC	SHI	EAB	TDR
1	United	6	4	2	0	9	4	+5	14	Advance to Final round	—	2–1	1–0	2–0
2	Shillong Lajong	6	4	1	1	13	3	+10	13	Advance to Final round	1–1	—	5–0	4–0
3	East Bengal (R)	6	2	1	3	8	8	0	7		0–0	0–1	—	5–0
4	The Diamond Rock	6	0	0	6	3	18	−15	0		2–3	0–1	1–3	—

Source: AIFF

4 April 2023 1	United	2–0	The Diamond Rock	Kalyani, West Bengal
15.00 IST	Mondal (yellow card) 33'; Murmu 41'; Chakraborty 90+5'	Report	Ghosh (yellow card) 82'	Stadium: Kalyani Stadium; Attendance: 205; Referee: Shantan Agrawal; Man of the Match: Amarendu Chakraborty (United)

4 April 2023 2	East Bengal (R)	0–1	Shillong Lajong	Naihati, West Bengal
15.00 IST	Roy (yellow card) 43'; Kiyam (yellow card) 73'; Mandi (yellow card) 90+4'	Report	Pursunep 50'	Stadium: Naihati Stadium; Attendance: 300; Referee: Ashish Tiwari; Man of the Match: Sambor Oneel Kharsahnoh (Shillong Lajong)

9 April 2023 3	East Bengal (R)	0–0	United	Naihati, West Bengal
15.00 IST	Vishnu (yellow card) 37'; Roy (yellow card) 54'	Report	Murmu (yellow card) 79'	Stadium: Naihati Stadium; Attendance: 1,000; Referee: Nishant Bhengra

9 April 2023 4	The Diamond Rock	0–1	Shillong Lajong	Balaghat, Madhya Pradesh
15.00 IST	Ghosh (yellow card) 90'	Report	Nongbri 68'	Stadium: Mulna Stadium; Attendance: 27; Referee: Ashish Tiwari; Man of the Match: Hardy Nongbri (Shillong Lajong)

14 April 2023 5	Shillong Lajong	1–1	United	Shillong, Meghalaya
14.00 IST	Mylliempdah 23'	Report	Murmu 33'; Das (yellow card) 74'; Mandi (yellow card) 75'	Stadium: SSA Stadium, 1st Ground; Attendance: 700; Referee: Jehrul Islam; Man of the Match: Everbrightson Sana Mylliempdah (Shillong Lajong)

14 April 2023 6	The Diamond Rock	1–3	East Bengal (R)	Balaghat, Madhya Pradesh
15.00 IST	Mangana 61'; Negi (yellow card) 90+5'	Report	Jesin 13'; Ghosh 80'; Bhowmick (yellow card) 87'; Saha 90+6'	Stadium: Mulna Stadium; Attendance: 54; Referee: V Eshwar Rao; Man of the Match: Sanjib Ghosh (East Bengal (R))

19 April 2023 7	Shillong Lajong	4–0	The Diamond Rock	Shillong, Meghalaya
14.00 IST	Nongbri 19' (pen.), 61'; Nonglait (yellow card) 36'; Marngar (yellow card) 45+1'; Kharbudon 70'; Ryngkhlem 90+1'	Report	Singh (yellow card) 50'; Malviya (yellow card) 68'	Stadium: SSA Stadium, 1st Ground; Attendance: 500; Referee: Jehrul Islam; Man of the Match: Hardy Nongbri (Shillong Lajong)

19 April 2023 8	United	1–0	East Bengal (R)	Kalyani, West Bengal
15.45 IST	Murmu 78'	Report	Vishnu (yellow card) 44'; Mondal (yellow card) 48'	Stadium: Kalyani Stadium; Attendance: 230; Referee: Ashish Tiwari; Man of the Match: Jiten Murmu (United)

23 April 2023 9	East Bengal (R)	5–0	The Diamond Rock	Naihati, West Bengal
15.30 IST	Angousana 26', 55'; Kiyam 38'; Gulzar 45+1' (o.g.); Singh 76'	Report		Stadium: Naihati Stadium; Attendance: 350; Referee: Priyobarta Singh Langpoklakpam; Man of the Match: Wahengbam Angousana (East Bengal (R))

24 April 2023 10	United	2–1	Shillong Lajong	Kalyani, West Bengal
15.00 IST	Mandi (yellow card) 16'; Chakraborty 23'; Tudu (yellow card) 66' (goal) 79'; Ghosh (yellow card) 67'; Das (yellow card) 75'; Murmu (yellow card) 90'	Report	Kharmaw (yellow card) 30'; Mylliempdah 59'; Marngar (yellow card) 67'; Lama (yellow card) 90'; Tariang (yellow card) 90'	Stadium: Kalyani Stadium; Attendance: 500; Referee: Joyshing Monsang Thumli; Man of the Match: Amit Tudu (United)

29 April 2023 11	Shillong Lajong	5–0	East Bengal (R)	Shillong, Meghalaya
14.00 IST	Nongneng (yellow card) 33'; Shianglong 42', 75'; Ryngkhlem 85'; Nonglait 90'; Nongbri 90+5'	Report	Vishnu (yellow card) 33'; Mondal (yellow card) 86' (red card) 87'; Khan (yellow card) 86' (red card) 87'	Stadium: SSA Stadium, 1st Ground; Attendance: 400; Referee: Prabhat Kalita; Man of the Match: Sangti Janai Shianglong (Shillong Lajong)

29 April 2023 12	The Diamond Rock	2–3	United	Balaghat, Madhya Pradesh
15.00 IST	Sarkar (yellow card) 33'; Rajak 36'; Rupnath (yellow card) 45+1' (goal) 90+3'	Report	Tudu (yellow card) 53'; Hembram 64'; Chakraborty 67'; Murmu 87' (pen.); Ghising (yellow card) 90+2'	Stadium: Mulna Football Stadium; Attendance: 125; Referee: Shantan Agrawal; Man of the Match: Tarak Hembram (United)

=== Group C ===
Pos	Team	Pld	W	D	L	GF	GA	GD	Pts	Qualification	FCBU	GTFC	BFC	CFC	RKM
1	Bengaluru United	8	5	2	1	21	5	+16	17	Advance to Final round	—	2–2	1–2	5–0	4–0
2	Golden Threads	8	3	3	2	13	11	+2	12		1–1	—	1–2	3–2	3–1
3	Bengaluru (R)	8	3	2	3	10	11	−1	11		0–2	1–1	—	2–1	2–2
4	Chennaiyin (R)	8	3	0	5	7	17	−10	9		0–5	0–1	1–0	—	2–1
5	RKM FA	8	2	1	5	8	15	−7	7		0–1	2–1	2–1	0–1	—

Source: AIFF

13 March 2023 1	Bengaluru United	1–2	Bengaluru (R)	Bengaluru, Karnataka
15.30 IST	Rawat (yellow card) 67'; Yadwad 77' (pen.); Iawphniaw (yellow card) 81'	Report	Yadav (yellow card) 36'; Gope (red card) 38'; Augustine 41'; Bhutia 69' (pen.); Sharma (yellow card) 80'; Singh (yellow card) 90+7'	Stadium: Bangalore Football Stadium; Attendance: 300; Referee: Ritesh Parsekar; Man of the Match: Robin Yadav (Bengaluru (R))

13 March 2023 2	Chennaiyin (R)	0–1	Golden Threads	Thiruporur, Tamil Nadu
15.30 IST		Report	Pradeesh (yellow card) 36' (yellow-red card) 87'; Thapa 45+3'; Au (yellow card) 57'	Stadium: SSN College Ground; Attendance: 50; Referee: Arvind Sekhar; Man of the Match: Bibake Thapa (Golden Threads)

17 March 2023 3	Bengaluru (R)	1–1	Golden Threads	Bengaluru, Karnataka
15.30 IST	Jha 5'; Kamalesh (yellow card) 49'	Report	Babu (yellow card) 59'; Thapa 68'	Stadium: Bangalore Football Stadium; Attendance: 300; Referee: Manjeet Singh; Man of the Match: Bibake Thapa (Golden Threads)

18 March 2023 4	Bengaluru United	4–0	RKM FA	Bengaluru, Karnataka
15.30 IST	Yadwad 3'; Meitei 20,90+8'; Franklin 26'; Kannan (yellow card) 90+6'	Report	Dhruw (yellow card) 11'; Sarkar (yellow card) 59'	Stadium: Bangalore Football Stadium; Attendance: 500; Referee: Irfan Imtiyaz Shaikh; Man of the Match: Ahongsghangbam Sushil Meitei (Bengaluru United)

22 March 2023 5	Golden Threads	3–1	RKM FA	Kochi, Kerala
16.00 IST	Boban 52,68'; Abdullah 70'; Dipin (yellow card) 87'	Report	Dhruw (yellow card) 65'; Kilomg 82'; Pramanik (yellow card) 87'	Stadium: Panampally Ground; Attendance: 275; Referee: Mrutyunjay L Amatya; Man of the Match: Bibin Boban (Golden Threads)

23 March 2023 6	Bengaluru (R)	2–1	Chennaiyin (R)	Bengaluru, Karnataka
15.30 IST	Yadav 45+3'; Lyngdoh 56'	Report	Himbahadur 13'; Nawab (yellow card) 63'	Stadium: Bangalore Football Stadium; Attendance: 200; Referee: Shantan Agrawal; Man of the Match: Shreyas Ketkar (Bengaluru (R))

27 March 2023 7	RKM FA	0–1	Chennaiyin (R)	Narayanpur, Chhattisgarh
16.00 IST	Halder (yellow card) 84'	Report	Himbahadur 3'; Niketh (yellow card) 28'; Mohanraj (yellow card) 90+2'; Manjula (yellow card) 90+6'	Stadium: Ramakrishna Mission Sports Complex; Attendance: 750; Referee: Shubhankar Khamri; Man of the Match: Gulab Rauth Himbahadur (Chennaiyin (R))

27 March 2023 8	Golden Threads	1–1	Bengaluru United	Kochi, Kerala
16.00 IST	Boban (yellow card) 27'; Sajeesh 83'	Report	Yadwad 45+1'; Sharma (yellow card) 69'	Stadium: Panampally Ground; Attendance: 250; Referee: Manjeet Singh; Man of the Match: Shajan Franklin (Bengaluru United)

31 March 2023 9	Chennaiyin (R)	0–5	Bengaluru United	Thiruporur, Tamil Nadu
15.30 IST	Solaimalai (yellow card) 30'	Report	Yadwad 11', 24', 85'; Meitei (yellow card) 45+3'; Franklin 62', 83' (yellow card) 69'	Stadium: SSN College Ground; Attendance: 60; Referee: Ajay Krishnan; Man of the Match: Irfan Yadwad (Bengaluru United)

31 March 2023 10	RKM FA	2–1	Bengaluru (R)	Narayanpur, Chhattisgarh
16.00 IST	Pramanik 22', 71'; Sarkar (yellow card) 31'	Report	Das 48' (o.g.); Kamalesh (yellow card) 69'	Stadium: Ramakrishna Mission Sports Complex; Attendance: 1,500; Referee: Simanta Kahar; Man of the Match: Abhijit Pramanik (RKM FA)

4 April 2023 11	Chennaiyin (R)	1–0	Bengaluru (R)	Thiruporur, Tamil Nadu
15.30 IST	Meitei 18' (yellow card) 79'; Roy (yellow card) 90+6'	Report	Jha (yellow card) 37'; Fernandes (yellow card) 51'; Lyngdoh (yellow card) 58'	Stadium: SSN College Ground; Attendance: 100; Referee: Sreekumar Narayana Pillai; Man of the Match: Mohanraj K (Chennaiyin (R))

5 April 2023 12	RKM FA	2–1	Golden Threads	Narayanpur, Chhattisgarh
16.00 IST	Khan 36' (pen.); Nureti (yellow card) 52'; Pramanik 79'	Report	Aliyar (yellow card) 18'; Manobin (yellow card) 35'; Madhu 90+4'; Timung (yellow card) 90+5'	Stadium: Ramakrishna Mission Sports Complex; Attendance: 1,500; Referee: Simanta Kahar

9 April 2023 13	Bengaluru United	2–2	Golden Threads	Bengaluru, Karnataka
15.30 IST	Yadwad 45+2' (pen.); Sharma 84'; Poojary (yellow card) 89'	Report	Muheeb (yellow card) 25'; Thapa 32'; Madhu 74' (yellow card) 74'; Aliyar (yellow card) 77'; Joshy (yellow card) 88'; Antony (yellow card) 90+2'	Stadium: Bangalore Football Stadium; Attendance: 200; Referee: K Ramdasan; Man of the Match: Manjit Sharma (Bengaluru United)

10 April 2023 14	Chennaiyin (R)	2–1	RKM FA	Thiruporur, Tamil Nadu
15.30 IST	Lalvenhima 69' (pen.); Niketh (yellow card) 73'; Zomuansanga 75'	Report	Dhruw (yellow card) 43'; Sarkar 50'	Stadium: SSN College Ground; Attendance: 25; Referee: Bagavath Sundhar Jee S Man of the Match: Zomuansanga (Chennaiyin (R))

13 April 2023 15	Bengaluru (R)	2–2	RKM FA	Bengaluru, Karnataka
15.30 IST	Yadav 61', 73'; Venkatesh (yellow card) 80'	Report	Khan 47' (pen.) (yellow card) 68'; Dhruw 75'; Karanga (yellow card) 89'	Stadium: Bangalore Football Stadium; Attendance: 150; Referee: Bimalendu Mondal; Man of the Match: Ayan Bhattacharya (RKM FA)

14 April 2023 16	Bengaluru United	5–0	Chennaiyin (R)	Bengaluru, Karnataka
15.30 IST	Mali 19'; Farooque (yellow card) 34'; Yadwad 42', 70'; Miranda (yellow card) 47'; Franklin 54'; Iawphniaw 75'	Report	Roy (yellow card) 26'; Lalchhanchhuaha (yellow card) 30'; Bebetto (yellow card) 79' (yellow-red card) 87'	Stadium: Bangalore Football Stadium; Attendance: 200; Referee: Manjeet Singh

18 April 2023 17	Golden Threads	3–2	Chennaiyin (R)	Kochi, Kerala
16.00 IST	Madhu 42' (pen.); Thapa 45'; Muheeb (yellow card) 54'; Abdullah 66'; Vishnu (yellow card) 80'; Babu (yellow card) 90+4'	Report	Borah 26'; Niketh (yellow card) 41'; Vivek 45+4'	Stadium: Panampally Ground; Attendance: 75; Referee: Mrutyunjay L Amatya

18 April 2023 18	Bengaluru (R)	0–2	Bengaluru United	Bengaluru, Karnataka
15.30 IST	Jha (yellow card) 34'	Report	Yadwad 57', 84' (pen.)	Stadium: Bangalore Football Stadium; Attendance: 300; Referee: K Ramdasan; Man of the Match: Irfan Yadwad (Bengaluru United)

24 April 2023 19	RKM FA	0–1	Bengaluru United	Narayanpur, Chhattisgarh
15.30 IST	Sirka (yellow card) 43'; Pramanik (yellow card) 51'; Mullick (yellow card) 59' (red card) 60'; Khan (yellow card) 59'; Sarkar (yellow card) 84'	Report	Mali 13'; Laishram (yellow card) 67'	Stadium: Ramakrishna Mission Sports Complex; Attendance: 980; Referee: Avisekh Saha; Man of the Match: Anil Chawan (Bengaluru United)

24 April 2023 20	Golden Threads	1–2	Bengaluru (R)	Kochi, Kerala
16.00 IST	Sahim 21'; Faseen (yellow card) 44'; Joshy (yellow card) 45+3'	Report	Yadav 35'; Kamalesh (yellow card) 42'; Singh 68'	Stadium: Panampally Ground; Attendance: 67; Referee: Ashwin; Man of the Match: Wungngayam Muirang (Bengaluru (R))

=== Group D ===
Pos	Team	Pld	W	D	L	GF	GA	GD	Pts	Qualification	AMB	ARA	DEM	HYD	GOA
1	Ambernath United Atlanta	8	5	2	1	17	9	+8	17 (Note: Head-to-head points: Ambernath United Atlanta 4, ARA 1.)	Advance to Final round	—	1–1	3–1	2–1	2–0
2	ARA FC	8	5	2	1	13	5	+8	17		1–2	—	2–1	2–1	3–0
3	Dempo	8	4	2	2	9	6	+3	14		2–1	0–0	—	1–0	1–0
4	Hyderabad (R)	8	1	1	6	4	10	−6	4		0–3	0–1	0–0	—	0–1
5	Goa (R)	8	1	1	6	4	17	−13	4		3–3	0–3	0–3	0–2	—

Source: AIFF
Notes:

15 March 2023 1	Dempo	1–0	Goa (R)	Ella, Goa
16.00 IST	Faria 45+1' (yellow card) 51'	Report	Fernandes (yellow card) 76'	Stadium: Dempo Academy Ground; Attendance: 163; Referee: Mohammed Junaid Saijad Tanji; Man of the Match: Brian Faria (Dempo)

15 March 2023 2	ARA FC	2–1	Hyderabad (R)	Ahmedabad, Gujarat
16.00 IST	Bhanwala (yellow card) 24' (goal) 72'; Shrestha 48'	Report	Dutta 89' (pen.)	Stadium: Shahibaug Police Stadium; Attendance: 850; Referee: Lalit Singh Rawat; Man of the Match: Naro Hari Shrestha (ARA FC)

19 March 2023 3	Ambernath United Atlanta	2–1	Hyderabad (R)	Mumbai, Maharashtra
16.00 IST	Perambra (yellow card) 1'; Shaikh 55'; Tawhare 76'	Report	Joshy (yellow card) 21'; Vanlalrinchhana 36'; Dutta (yellow card) 60'	Stadium: Cooperage Ground; Attendance: 2,150; Referee: Akashkumar Kamleshkumar Mehta; Man of the Match: Arif Shaikh (Ambernath United Atlanta)

19 March 2023 4	ARA FC	3–0	Goa (R)	Ahmedabad, Gujarat
16.00 IST	Jacob 22'; Valan 24', 36'; Sagayaraj (yellow card) 45+3'	Report		Stadium: Shahibaug Police Stadium; Attendance: 350; Referee: Kishor Gangaram Choudhari; Man of the Match: Shanid Valan (ARA FC)

25 March 2023 5	Ambernath United Atlanta	1–1	ARA FC	Mumbai, Maharashtra
16.00 IST	Patil (yellow card) 67'; Mathews 79'; Koli (yellow card) 82'	Report	Bhanwala (yellow card) 40'; Shrestha 45+2'; Sagayaraj (yellow card) 67'; Chowdhury (yellow card) 90+3'	Stadium: Cooperage Ground; Attendance: 300; Referee: Ritesh Rajaram Parsekar; Man of the Match: Johnson Joseph Mathews (Ambernath United Atlanta)

25 March 2023 6	Hyderabad (R)	0–0	Dempo	Bengaluru, Karnataka
15.30 IST	Joshy (yellow card) 77'; Vanlalrinchhana (yellow card) 90+6'	Report	Vaz (yellow card) 64'	Stadium: Bangalore Football Stadium; Attendance: 550; Referee: Arvind Sekhar A Man of the Match: Abhijith PA (Hyderabad (R))

29 March 2023 7	Dempo	0–0	ARA FC	Ella, Goa
16.00 IST	Ali (yellow card) 90+3'	Report		Stadium: Dempo Academy Ground; Attendance: 250; Referee: Rohan Das Gupta; Man of the Match: Beneston Barretto (Dempo)

30 March 2023 8	Goa (R)	3–3	Ambernath United Atlanta	Nagoa, Goa
16.00 IST	Colaco 9'; Borges 27'; Pereira 75'	Report	Patil 14' (yellow card) 21'; Koli 16'; Shaikh 62'; Perambra (yellow card) 85'	Stadium: Nagoa Panchayat Ground; Attendance: 350; Referee: Surojit Das; Man of the Match: Delton Colaco (Goa (R))

2 April 2023 9	Dempo	2–1	Ambernath United Atlanta	Ella, Goa
16.00 IST	Pires 51'; Fernandes 60'	Report	Koli 17'; Mathews (yellow card) 66'; Viegas (yellow card) 89'	Stadium: Dempo Academy Ground; Attendance: 190; Referee: Sanilkumar KG; Man of the Match: Shallum Pires (Dempo)

3 April 2023 10	Hyderabad (R)	0–1	Goa (R)	Bengaluru, Karnataka
15.30 IST	Lalnundanga (yellow card) 29'	Report	Colaco 77'	Stadium: Bangalore Football Stadium; Attendance: 200; Referee: Mrutyunjay L Amatya; Man of the Match: Delton Colaco (Goa (R))

7 April 2023 11	Ambernath United Atlanta	2–0	Goa (R)	Mumbai, Maharashtra
16.00 IST	Shetty 58'; Patil 90+4'; Murali (yellow card) 90+7'	Report	Salgaonkar (yellow card) 56'; Dias (yellow card) 90+5' (yellow-red card) 90+7'	Stadium: Cooperage Ground; Attendance: 1,000; Referee: A Arun Chakkaravarthi

7 April 2023 12	ARA FC	2–1	Dempo	Ahmedabad, Gujarat
16.00 IST	Lalthankhuma (yellow card) 36'; Shrestha 45+3'; Singh 79'	Report	Fernandes 21'; Pires (yellow card) 90+1'	Stadium: Shahibaug Police Stadium; Attendance: 120; Referee: Mohammed Junaid Saijad Tanji; Man of the Match: Manvir Singh (ARA FC)

11 April 2023 13	Ambernath United Atlanta	3–1	Dempo	Mumbai, Maharashtra
16.00 IST	Shetty 56'; Patil (yellow card) 59' (goal) 60'; Ravindra (yellow card) 69'; Shaikh 81'	Report	Kuldeep (yellow card) 30'; Barreto 37'; Colaco (yellow card) 71' (yellow-red card) 90+4'	Stadium: Cooperage Ground; Attendance: 400; Referee: Jarvish Macwan; Man of the Match: Arif Shaikh (Ambernath United Atlanta)

15 April 2023 14	Goa (R)	0–3	Dempo	Nagoa, Goa
16.00 IST	Fernandes (red card) 50'; Passanha (yellow card) 64'; Fernandes (yellow card) 88'	Report	Barretto 12', 36'; Kankonkar (yellow card) 15' (yellow-red card) 51'; Ali 66'	Stadium: Nagoa Panchayat Ground; Attendance: 500; Referee: Ashwin; Man of the Match: Beneston Piecton Barretto (Dempo SC)

16 April 2023 15	Hyderabad (R)	0–1	ARA FC	Bengaluru, Karnataka
15.30 IST	Vanlalrinchhana (yellow card) 45+2'; Chhetry (yellow card) 67'	Report	Lalthankhuma (yellow card) 45+3'; Kattookaren (yellow card) 54'; Shrestha 64' (yellow card) 67'	Stadium: Bangalore Football Stadium; Attendance: 120; Referee: Arvind Sekhar A Man of the Match: Sangramjit Roy Chowdhury (ARA FC)

20 April 2023 16	Hyderabad (R)	0–3	Ambernath United Atlanta	Bengaluru, Karnataka
15.30 IST	Laldanmawia (yellow card) 25'; Rafi (yellow card) 80'	Report	Khan 9', 27'; Murali (yellow card) 74'; Shaikh 77'; Mathews (yellow card) 90+2'; Azavedo (yellow card) 90+6'	Stadium: Bangalore Football Stadium; Attendance: 125; Referee: K Ramdasan; Man of the Match: Adil Khan (Ambernath United Atlanta)

20 April 2023 17	Goa (R)	0–3	ARA FC	Nagoa, Goa
16.00 IST	Castanha (yellow card) 55'	Report	Singh 5'; Shrestha 9', 60'; Kattookaren (yellow card) 54'	Stadium: Nagoa Panchayat Ground; Attendance: 47; Referee: Irfan Imtiyaz Shaikh; Man of the Match: Naro Hari Shrestha (ARA FC)

23 April 2023 18	Goa (R)	0–2	Hyderabad (R)	Nagoa, Goa
16.00 IST	Paes (red card) 23'	Report	Fernandes 12' (o.g.); Vanlalhriatpuia (yellow card) 29'; Vanlalrinchhana 35' (pen.); Chhetry (yellow card) 45+4'	Stadium: Nagoa Panchayat Ground; Attendance: 40; Referee: Anand Rana; Man of the Match: Crespo Vanlalhriatpuia (Hyderabad (R))

27 April 2023 19	Dempo	1–0	Hyderabad (R)	Ella, Goa
16.00 IST	Ali (yellow card) 15'; Bagkar 85'; Kuldeep (yellow card) 90'; Harji (yellow card) 90+5'		Joshy (yellow card) 30'; Vanlalrinchhana (yellow card) 73' (yellow-red card) 87'; Zohminghlua (yellow card) 89'; Rafi (yellow card) 90+2'	Stadium: Dempo Academy Ground; Attendance: 40; Referee: Mohammed Junaid Sajjad Tanji; Man of the Match: Saiesh Bagkar (Dempo)

27 April 2023 20	ARA FC	1–2	Ambernath United Atlanta	Ahmedabad, Gujarat
16.30 IST	Singh 13'; Bhanwala (yellow card) 35'; Rana (yellow card) 55'; Chowdhury (yellow card) 90+6'	Report	Patil 21'; Shetty 90+6'	Stadium: Shahibaug Police Stadium; Attendance: 200; Referee: Lalit Singh Rawat; Man of the Match: Saurabh Bhanwala (ARA FC)

=== Ranking of second-placed teams ===
Since Group B has fewer teams, the result against fifth-placed teams in other groups will not be counted for the table ranking below.

Pos	Grp	Team	Pld	W	D	L	GF	GA	GD	Pts	Qualification
1	B	Shillong Lajong	6	4	1	1	13	3	+10	13	Advanced to Final round
2	D	ARA	6	3	2	1	7	5	+2	11	
3	A	Downtown Heroes	6	3	1	2	5	5	0	10	
4	C	Golden Threads	6	2	3	1	9	8	+1	9	

Updated to match(es) played on unknown. Source: AIFF

== Final round ==
The top 5 teams from the group stage will play each other in the final round in a single-leg format. The top 2 teams will qualify for the I-League.

Pos	Team	Pld	W	D	L	GF	GA	GD	Pts	Qualification
1	Delhi	4	2	1	1	6	4	+2	7	Champions and Promotion to 2023–24 I-League
2	Shillong Lajong	4	2	1	1	5	7	−2	7	Promotion to 2023–24 I-League
3	Ambernath United Atlanta	4	2	0	2	10	8	+2	6	2023–24 I-League 2
4	Bengaluru United	4	2	0	2	3	3	0	6	2023–24 I-League 2
5	United	4	1	0	3	7	9	−2	3	2023–24 I-League 2

Source: AIFF
Rules for classification: 1) points; 2) head-to-head points; 3) head-to-head goal difference; 4) head-to-head goals scored; 5) goal difference; 6) number of goals scored; 7) fair play ranking; 8) drawing of lots

6 May 2023 1	Shillong Lajong	2–1	United	Shillong, Meghalaya
15.00 IST	Nongbri 33'; Nongneng (yellow card) 37'; Nonglait (yellow card) 44'; Syndai 45+2'; Tariang (yellow card) 90+5'	Report	Hembram (yellow card) 18'; Mondal 38'	Stadium: SSA Stadium; Attendance: 2,000; Referee: Jehrul Islam

6 May 2023 2	Bengaluru United	1–0	Delhi	Bengaluru, Karnataka
16.00 IST	Nickson (yellow card) 45+2'; Sharma (yellow card) 49'; Poojary (yellow card) 56'; Yadwad 76' (yellow card) 76'	Report	Rawat (yellow card) 24'; Vanlalhriatzuala (yellow card) 75'; Balwant (yellow card) 90+4'	Stadium: Bangalore Football Stadium; Attendance: 147; Referee: K Ramdasan; Man of the Match: Irfan Yadwad (FC Bengaluru United)

11 May 2023 3	Delhi	0–0	Shillong Lajong	Mohali, Punjab
16.00 IST	Temuri (yellow card) 89'	Report		Stadium: Minerva Sports Complex; Attendance: 180; Referee: Dipu Roy; Man of the Match: Munmun Timothy Lugun (Delhi FC)

11 May 2023 4	Ambernath United Atlanta	1–0	Bengaluru United	Mumbai, Maharashtra
16.30 IST	Ravindra (yellow card) 45+2'; Tawhare 82'	Report	Yadwad (yellow card) 44'	Stadium: Cooperage Ground; Attendance: 2,100; Referee: Williams Joy Koshy; Man of the Match: Ashley Alban Koli (Ambernath United Atlanta)

16 May 2023 5	United	2–3	Delhi	Kalyani, West Bengal
15.15 IST	Ghising (yellow card) 45'; Roy 68'; Hembram 79'	Report	Balwant 4', 45+6'; Manvir (yellow card) 39'; Rawat (yellow card) 45' (yellow-red card) 84'; Gagandeep 52'; Hazra (yellow card) 90+4'	Stadium: Kalyani Stadium; Attendance: 1,000; Referee: Ashish Tiwari

16 May 2023 6	Ambernath United Atlanta	5–1	Shillong Lajong	Mumbai, Maharashtra
16.00 IST	Shaikh 22'; Khan 44'; Shetty 56'; Raut (yellow card) 73'; Matthews 87'; Patil 88'	Report	Nongbri 67'	Stadium: Cooperage Ground; Attendance: 1,000; Referee: Mithun Kumar Kundu; Man of the Match: Himanshu Patil (Ambernath United Atlanta)

21 May 2023 7	Shillong Lajong	2–1	Bengaluru United	Shillong, Meghalaya
15.00 IST	Mylliempdah 43' (yellow card) 44'; Syndai 82'; Lyngdoh (yellow card) 90+6'	Report	Nickson (yellow card) 35'; Sharma 51'; Rawat (yellow card) 66' (yellow-red card) 90+3'; Meitei (yellow card) 67'	Stadium: SSA Stadium; Attendance: 5,275; Referee: Lakshay; Man of the Match: Figo Syndai (Shillong Lajong)

21 May 2023 8	United	4–3	Ambernath United Atlanta	Kalyani, West Bengal
15.30 IST	Hembram 38'; Roy 56'; Raut 63' (o.g.); Mondal (yellow card) 74'; Subrata 90+4'	Report	Koli (yellow card) 34' (goal) 57'; Shetty (yellow card) 45'; Patil (yellow card) 76' (goal) 90+7'; Multani 90+2'	Stadium: Kalyani Stadium; Attendance: 500; Referee: Priyobarta Singh Langpoklakpam; Man of the Match: Tarak Hembram (United SC)

26 May 2023 9	Bengaluru United	1–0	United	Bengaluru, Karnataka
15.30 IST	Yadwad 13'; Sharma (yellow card) 47'; Ghosh (yellow card) 88'	Report	Ghising (yellow card) 49'	Stadium: Bangalore Football Stadium; Attendance: 147; Referee: Tejas Visvasrao Nagvenkar; Man of the Match: Irfan Yadwad (FC Bengaluru United)

26 May 2023 10	Delhi	3–1	Ambernath United Atlanta	Mohali, Punjab
16.00 IST	Gagandeep 33', 56'; Temuri (yellow card) 45+1'; Gurtej (yellow card) 72'; Lalrinzuala (yellow card) 76'; Vanlalhriatzuala 86'	Report	Monde (yellow card) 20'; Patil 48'	Stadium: Minerva Sports Complex; Attendance: 250; Referee: Pranjal Banerjee; Man of the Match: Bali Gagandeep (Delhi FC)

== Season statistics ==
=== Top scorers ===
As of 26 May 2023

Rank	Player	Club	Goals
1	(India) Irfan Yadwad	Bengaluru United	13
2	(India) Hardy Nongbri	Shillong Lajong	8
3	(India) Balwant Singh	Delhi	7
3	(India) Ateeb Ahmed Dar	Downtown Heroes	7
3	(India) Himanshu Patil	Ambernath United Atlanta	7

==== Hat-tricks ====
Player	For	Against	Result	Date	Ref
(India) Irfan Yadwad	Bengaluru United	Chennaiyin (R)	0–5 (A)	31 March 2023	

=== Clean sheets ===
As of 26 May 2023

Rank	Player	Club	Clean sheets
1	(India) Bishal Lama	Shillong Lajong	6
2	(India) Furqan Ahmad Dar	Downtown Heroes	5
2	(India) Antonio Da Silva	Dempo	5
2	(India) Srijith R	Bengaluru United	5
5	(India) Sangramjit Roy Chowdhury	ARA	4
5	(India) Nitish Mehra	Delhi	4

=== Discipline ===
==== Player ====
- Most yellow cards: 4
  - (India) Gaurav Rawat
  - (India) Himanshu Patil
  - (India) Shahmeer Tariq
  - (India) Aron Vanlalrinchhana
- Most red cards: 1
  - 18 players

==== Club ====
- Most yellow cards: 21
  - FC Bengaluru United
- Most red cards: 3
  - FC Goa (R)

== Attendances ==
=== Overall statistical table ===
Pos	Team	Total	High	Low	Average	Change
1	Shillong Lajong	8,875	5,275	400	1,775	n/a
2	RKM FA	4,730	1,500	750	1,182	n/a
3	Ambernath United Atlanta	6,950	2,150	300	1,158	n/a
4	Downtown Heroes	2,700	2,000	50	675	n/a
5	East Bengal (R)	1,650	1,000	300	550	n/a
6	United	2,435	1,000	205	487	n/a
7	ARA	1,520	850	120	380	n/a
8	Jagat Singh Palahi	1,250	500	200	312	n/a
9	Mumbai City (R)	1,143	523	200	285	n/a
10	Bengaluru United	1,494	500	147	249	n/a
11	Hyderabad (R)	995	550	120	248	n/a
12	Goa (R)	937	500	40	234	n/a
13	Bengaluru (R)	850	300	150	212	n/a
14	Delhi	1,030	250	60	171	n/a
15	Golden Threads	667	275	67	166	n/a
16	Dempo	643	250	40	160	n/a
17	Techtro Swades United	640	250	90	160	n/a
18	The Diamond Rock	206	125	27	68	n/a
19	Chennaiyin (R)	235	100	25	58	n/a
	League total	38,950	5,275	25	475	n/a

Source: I-League.org

== See also ==
- 2022–23 Indian Super League
- 2022–23 I-League
- 2022–23 Elite Youth League
- 2023 RF Development League
