= Hardy Nongbri =

Indian footballer

Personal information
- Full name: Hardy Cliff Nongbri
- Date of birth: 17 August 1997 (age 29)
- Place of birth: Meghalaya, India
- Position: Attacking midfielder

Team information
- Current team: Shillong Lajong
- Number: 11

Youth career
- –2016: Shillong Lajong

Senior career*
Years	Team	Apps	(Gls)
2016–2019	Shillong Lajong	25	(0)
2019–2020	Southern Samity	6	(0)
2020–2022	Ryntih	3	(0)
2022–2023	Bengaluru United	18	(2)
2023–	Shillong Lajong	48	(12)
- * Club domestic league appearances and goals as of 23:55, 16 March 2025 (UTC)

Hardy Cliff Nongbri (born 17 August 1997) is an Indian professional footballer who plays as a midfielder for Shillong Lajong.

== Career ==
Born in Meghalaya, Nongbri started his footballing career with Shillong Lajong, playing for the team in the local Shillong leagues and the I-League U19 league. Eventually, before the 2015–16 I-League, Nongbri was promoted to the first-team.

He made his professional debut for the club on 10 April 2016 against Sporting Goa. He came on as an 88th-minute substitute for Zodingliana Ralte as Shillong Lajong lost 5–2.

== Career statistics ==
=== Club ===
As of 16 March 2025

Club	Season	League			Cup		AFC		Others		Total	
Club	Season	Division	Apps	Goals	Apps	Goals	Apps	Goals	Apps	Goals	Apps	Goals
Shillong Lajong	2015–16	I-League	1	0	–		–		–		1	0
Shillong Lajong	2016–17	I-League	3	0	1 (Note: Appearance(s) in Federation Cup)	0	–		–		4	0
Shillong Lajong	2017–18	I-League	16	0	–		–		–		16	0
Shillong Lajong	2018–19	I-League	5	0	–		–		–		5	0
Shillong Lajong	Total		25	0	1	0	0	0	0	0	26	0
Ryntih	2021	I-League 2nd Division	3	0	–		–		–		3	0
Shillong Lajong	2022–23	I-League 2nd Division	12	8	–		–		–		12	8
Shillong Lajong	2023–24	I-League	19	2	1 (Note: Appearance(s) in Super Cup)	0	–		3 (Note: Appearance(s) in Durand Cup)	0	23	2
Shillong Lajong	2024–25	I-League	17	2	–		–		5	0	22	2
Shillong Lajong	Total		48	12	1	0	0	0	8	0	57	12
Total			76	12	2	0	0	0	8	0	86	12

== Honours ==
Shillong Lajong

- I-League 2: 2022–23
