= Saurabh Bhanwala =

Indian footballer

Personal information
- Date of birth: 18 December 1999 (age 26)
- Place of birth: Uttar Pradesh, India
- Height: 1.90 m (6 ft 3 in)
- Position: Centre-back

Team information
- Current team: Mohun Bagan Super Giant
- Number: 63

Youth career
- Minerva Academy

Senior career*
Years	Team	Apps	(Gls)
2018–2022	RoundGlass Punjab	11	(0)
2020	Minerva Punjab B	5	(1)
2019	→ Calcutta Customs (loan)	6	(1)
2022–2023	Rajasthan United		
2023	ARA	7	(1)
2023	Diamond Harbour	12	(4)
2023-2024	Namdhari FC	20	(1)
2024 - 2026	Mohun Bagan	2	(0)
2026 -	Odisha	0	(0)
- * Club domestic league appearances and goals as of 4/5/24 @ 17:30(AEST)

Saurabh Bhanwala (born 18 December 1999) is an Indian professional footballer who plays as a defender for Indian super league club Mohun Bagan Super Giant.

== Career ==
Saurabh Bhanwala as a child started playing in New Delhi and playing U-14 nationals representing Delhi state held at Kalyani in 2012. Bhanwala is a product of Minerva Punjab youth system where he had an outstanding season in U-18 I-league which was held at Shillong, Bhanwala stayed with minerva next season where he was part of their senior team in I-League. After Bhanwala went on loan to CFL (Calcutta Football League) to Calcutta Custom, after it bhanwala returned to minerva playing for Punjab II where he played 2nd div i-league, after Bhanwala joined senior I-League team Roundglass Punjab FC, Saurabh Bhanwala made his first professional appearance in senior I-League for RoundGlass Punjab on 9 January 2021 against Aizawl FC. He played several games for roundglass in 2020–21 season and also won the title for "Defensive action of the season " award.

== Career statistics ==
=== Club ===
As of 27 April 2023

Club	Season	League			Cup		AFC		Total	
Club	Season	Division	Apps	Goals	Apps	Goals	Apps	Goals	Apps	Goals
RoundGlass Punjab	2020–21	I-League	8	0	3	0	–		11	0
RoundGlass Punjab	2021–22	I-League	3	0	0	0	–		3	0
RoundGlass Punjab	Total		11	0	3	0	0	0	14	0
Minerva Punjab B	2020	I-League 2nd Division	5	1	0	0	—		5	1
Rajasthan United	2022–23	I-League	0	0	0	0	–		0	0
ARA	2022–23	I-League 2	7	1	0	0	–		7	1
Career total			23	2	3	0	0	0	26	2

Mohun Bagan Super Giant 2024–25 
Odisha FC 2025-currently

== Honours ==
Rajasthan United

- Baji Rout Cup: 2022
