= Vinil Poojary =

Indian footballer

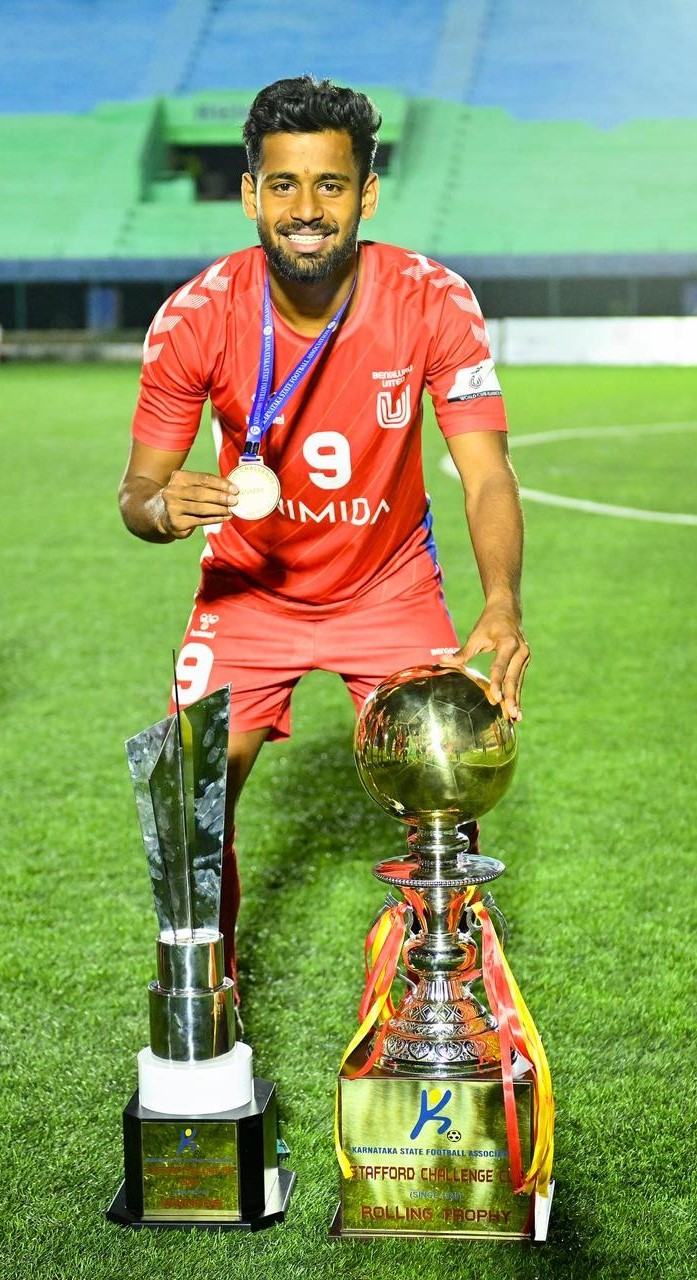

Personal information
- Date of birth: 27 August 1997 (age 29)
- Place of birth: Mangalore, Karnataka, India
- Height: 1.72 m (5 ft 7 1/2 in)
- Position: Winger

Team information
- Current team: Delhi
- Number: 9

Senior career*
| Years | Team | Apps | (Gls) |
| 2017–2018 | Ozone | 10 | (0) |
| 2018–2022 | Churchill Brothers | 33 | (2) |
| 2022–2023 | Jamshedpur B | 4 | (0) |
| 2023 | Bengaluru United | 11 | (1) |
| 2023– | Delhi | 0 | (0) |
- * Club domestic league appearances and goals as of 16:33, 26 May 2023 (UTC)

Vinil Poojary (born 27 August 1997) is an Indian professional footballer who plays as a winger for I-League club Delhi.

== Career ==
Poojary made his professional debut for the Churchill Brothers against Punjab F.C. on 28 October 2018, He was brought in the 52nd minute as Churchill Brothers drew 0–0.

=== Jamshedpur B ===
In August 2022, Poojary signed for Jamshedpur B from Churchill Brothers.

=== FC Bengaluru United ===
In January 2023, Poojary signed for FC Bengaluru United from Jamshedpur B. He scored a crucial freekick goal in the Stafford Cup finals against Chennaiyin FC and now he's playing in the Hero 2nd Division I-League 2023.

== Career statistics ==
=== Club ===
As of 1 September 2022

| Club | Season | League | | | Cup | | AFC | | Total | |
| Club | Season | Division | Apps | Goals | Apps | Goals | Apps | Goals | Apps | Goals |
|---|---|---|---|---|---|---|---|---|---|---|
| Ozone | 2017–18 | I-League 2nd Division | 10 | 0 | 0 | 0 | — | | 10 | 0 |
| Churchill Brothers | 2018–19 | I-League | 4 | 0 | 0 | 0 | — | | 4 | 0 |
| Churchill Brothers | 2019–20 | I-League | 10 | 2 | 0 | 0 | — | | 10 | 2 |
| Churchill Brothers | 2020–21 | I-League | 10 | 0 | 0 | 0 | — | | 10 | 0 |
| Churchill Brothers | 2021–22 | I-League | 9 | 0 | 0 | 0 | — | | 9 | 0 |
| Churchill Brothers | Total | | 33 | 2 | 0 | 0 | 0 | 0 | 33 | 2 |
| Jamshedpur | 2022–23 | Indian Super League | 0 | 0 | 4 (Note: Appearance(s) in Durand Cup) | 0 | — | | 4 | 0 |
| Bengaluru United | 2022–23 | I-League 2 | 9 | 0 | 0 | 0 | — | | 9 | 0 |
| Delhi | 2023–24 | I-League | 0 | 0 | 0 | 0 | — | | 0 | 0 |
| Career total | | | 52 | 2 | 4 | 0 | 0 | 0 | 56 | 2 |
