= Mohamed Ali (footballer) =

Indian professional footballer (born 1992)

Personal information
- Date of birth: 13 July 1992 (age 34)
- Place of birth: Caranzalem, Goa
- Height: 1.78 m (5 ft 10 in)
- Position: Centre-back

Team information
- Current team: Dempo
- Number: 37

Youth career
- Goa United
- Dempo
- Sporting Goa

Senior career*
Years	Team	Apps	(Gls)
2015–2017	Dempo	10	(0)
2017	NEROCA	8	(0)
2017–2022	Goa	34	(0)
2023–	Dempo		
- * Club domestic league appearances and goals

Mohamed Ali (born 13 July 1992) is an Indian professional footballer who plays as a defender for Dempo in the I-League.

Ali has won promotion from the I-League 2nd Division twice in two consecutive seasons, with Dempo and NEROCA.

== Career ==
=== Early life ===
Ali was born in Caranzalem, Goa, and raised in poverty by his single mother, Dilshad Bi Ali. As a child, Ali grew an affinity towards football and would play whenever he could. His brother, Niyazuddin, saw Ali's ability to play football as unnerving and wanted Mohamed to focus on studies, rather than football. The principal at his school, Don Bosco, and his physical education teacher, Francis Raposo, however, encouraged Ali to play and develop his game.

Ali started playing organized football for Goa United's under-18 side before moving to the professional side Dempo. He played for the side during the Taca Goa Under-20 league. In search of establishing his professional career, and wanting first-team minutes, Ali soon moved on to Sporting Goa. However, after finding game time hard to earn, Ali moved again to Goa Professional League side Santa Cruz Club of Cavelossim. He then spent a season with another Goa Professional League club, Laxmi Prasad, before signing back with Dempo.

=== Dempo ===
Before the 2015–16 Goa Professional League, it was announced that Ali had returned to Dempo. He also played for the side during their 2015–16 I-League 2nd Division campaign. In May 2016, after forming a partnership at center-back with Chika Wali, Ali helped Dempo earn promotion back to the I-League after being relegated the previous season.

After the season ended, Ali was selected to be part of the Goa football team that would participate in the Santosh Trophy. Ali helped guide the Goa team to an unbeaten run through the group stages but couldn't prevent Goa from being defeated during extra-time against Services in the semi-finals. Ali conceded an own goal as extra-time was finishing while trying to clear a shot from Arjun Tudu as Goa lost 1–0.

=== NEROCA ===
On 9 March 2017, it was announced that Ali would join I-League 2nd Division side NEROCA before the final round of the 2016–17 season. Once again, like he did the previous season with Dempo, Ali helped guide NEROCA to promotion to the I-League.

=== Goa ===
On 23 July 2017, Ali was selected in the 10th round of the 2017–18 ISL Players Draft by Goa for the 2017–18 Indian Super League. Before the draft, Ali had already spoken to Goa, along with other Indian Super League sides NorthEast United, Jamshedpur, and Mumbai City, but was not surprised he was selected by Goa. "I always imagined being part of the team and hoped of getting the opportunity to prove myself. I had always wished to play for my home club and I'm sure that every player in Goa has that dream to get there. I found myself lucky to be picked by the Gaurs," he said after being selected.

Ali made his professional debut for Goa during their first match of the season against Chennaiyin on 19 November 2017. He started the match as Goa won 3–2. A week later, after starting in Goa's defeat against Mumbai City, Ali started and helped Goa earn a 4–3 victory over Bengaluru on 30 November. After the match he was awarded the Emerging Player of the Match for his performance at centerback.

On 24 January 2018, Ali signed a new contract with the Goa keeping him at the club until 2020.

== Career statistics ==
=== Club ===
As of 29 March 2023

Club	Season	League			Cup		AFC		Total	
Club	Season	Division	Apps	Goals	Apps	Goals	Apps	Goals	Apps	Goals
Dempo	2015–16	I-League 2nd Division	10	0	0	0	–		10	0
NEROCA	2016–17	I-League 2nd Division	8	0	0	0	–		8	0
Goa	2017–18	Indian Super League	17	0	1 (Note: Appearance(s) in Super Cup)	0	–		18	0
Goa	2018–19	Indian Super League	6	0	0	0	–		6	0
Goa	2019–20	Indian Super League	1	0	0	0	–		1	0
Goa	2020–21	Indian Super League	5	0	0	0	1 (Note: Appearance(s) in AFC Champions League)	0	6	0
Goa	2021–22	Indian Super League	4	0	0	0	–		4	0
Goa	Goa total		33	0	1	0	1	0	35	0
Dempo	2022–23	I-League 2	3	0	0	0	–		3	0
Career total			54	0	1	0	1	0	56	0

== Honours ==
FC Goa

- Indian Super Cup: 2019
