= Luka Majcen =

Slovenian footballer (born 1989)

Personal information
- Date of birth: 25 July 1989 (age 37)
- Height: 1.76 m (5 ft 9 in)
- Position: Striker

Team information
- Current team: Mumbai City
- Number: 99

Youth career
- –2008: Interblock

Senior career*
Years	Team	Apps	(Gls)
2008–2011	Interblock	74	(11)
2008	→ Livar (loan)	7	(0)
2011–2012	Rudar Velenje	31	(10)
2012–2013	Koper	22	(0)
2013–2014	Triglav Kranj	26	(6)
2014–2015	Gorica	29	(7)
2016–2017	Krka	14	(2)
2017–2020	Triglav Kranj	96	(33)
2020–2021	Churchill Brothers	15	(11)
2021	Bengaluru United	12	(15)
2022	Gokulam Kerala	13	(13)
2022–2025	Punjab	62	(34)
2025–2026	Diamond Harbour	12	(4)
2026–	Mumbai City	0	(0)

International career
2007	Slovenia U18	5	(0)
2007	Slovenia U19	7	(1)
2009	Slovenia U20	3	(0)
2009	Slovenia U21	3	(1)
- * Club domestic league appearances and goals as of 12 November 2026

Luka Majcen (born 25 July 1989) is a Slovenian professional footballer who plays as a striker for Indian Super League club Mumbai City.

== Club career ==
=== Early career ===
Majcen started his senior career with Interblock.

=== Churchill Brothers ===
In 2020, Majcen moved to India and signed with Churchill Brothers in the I-League. He was the second best goalscorer of the 2020–21 I-League season with 11 goals in 15 matches.

=== Bengaluru United ===
In August 2021, Majcen moved to I-League 2nd Division side Bengaluru United. He made his debut on 6 September in a 1–0 win against Central Reserve Police Force in the group stage of the 2021 Durand Cup, but their journey ended with a 4–2 defeat to Mohammedan Sporting in the semi-finals.

With Bengaluru United, he won the 2021–22 Bangalore Super Division title, in which he emerged as the league's top scorer with 15 goals and provided five assists.

=== Gokulam Kerala ===
On 9 January 2022, it was announced that I-League defending champions Gokulam Kerala have signed Majcen for the remainder of the season.

On 3 March 2022, he made his debut for the club in I-League match against NEROCA, which ended in a 0–0 stalemate. Majcen scored his first goals for Gokulam Kerala on 7 March, in their 5–1 win against Real Kashmir. He scored his first hat-trick on 12 March in their 6–2 win against Kenkre. With Gokulam Kerala, Majcen won the league title in the 2021–22 season, defeating Mohammedan Sporting 2–1 in the final game at the Salt Lake Stadium on 14 May, as Gokulam became the first club in fifteen years to defend the title. Overall, Majcen scored thirteen league goals during the season.

In the 2022 AFC Cup group stage opener, Majcen scored a brace in Gokulam's 4–2 win against ATK Mohun Bagan. He also appeared in the remaining two matches when Gokulam was defeated 1–0 by Maldivian side Maziya S&RC, and 2–1 by Bashundhara Kings of Bangladesh, respectively, and was eliminated from the tournament.

=== Punjab ===
On 23 September 2022, Majcen joined another I-League side RoundGlass Punjab on a one-year deal. With Punjab, Majcen won the 2022–23 I-League title, his second consecutive I-League championship, and helped the team gain promotion to the Indian Super League. He was also named the player of the season and was the league's top scorer with 16 goals.

Majcen made his Indian Super League debut on 23 September 2023, in their 3–1 away defeat to Mohun Bagan, in which he scored the club's first ever goal in India's top division. He was part of the team's historic first win in the Super League on 18 December, when Punjab defeated Chennaiyin 1–0 at home to end their ten-match winless streak.

== Career statistics ==
=== Club ===
As of 10 March 2025

Appearances and goals by club, season and competition
Club	Season	League			National cup (Note: Includes Slovenian Football Cup, Super Cup)		Continental		Other		Total	
Club	Season	Division	Apps	Goals	Apps	Goals	Apps	Goals	Apps	Goals	Apps	Goals
Interblock	2007–08	Slovenian PrvaLiga	6	0	1	0	—		—		7	0
Interblock	2008–09	Slovenian PrvaLiga	23	1	3	0	—		—		26	1
Interblock	2009–10	Slovenian PrvaLiga	20	1	1	0	1 (Note: Appearances in UEFA Europa League)	0	—		22	1
Interblock	2010–11	Slovenian Second League	25	9	6	3	—		—		31	12
Interblock	Total		74	11	11	3	1	0	—		86	14
Livar (loan)	2008–09	Slovenian Second League	7	0	0	0	—		—		7	0
Rudar Velenje	2011–12	Slovenian PrvaLiga	31	10	3	2	—		—		34	12
Koper	2012–13	Slovenian PrvaLiga	22	0	4	2	—		—		26	2
Triglav	2013–14	Slovenian PrvaLiga	26	6	0	0	—		—		26	6
Gorica	2014–15	Slovenian PrvaLiga	29	7	2	2	2	1	—		33	10
Krka	2015–16	Slovenian PrvaLiga	14	2	0	0	—		—		14	2
Triglav	2016–17	Slovenian Second League	6	4	0	0	—		—		6	4
Triglav	2017–18	Slovenian PrvaLiga	30	3	3	1	—		—		33	4
Triglav	2018–19	Slovenian PrvaLiga	33	17	1	0	—		—		34	17
Triglav	2019–20	Slovenian PrvaLiga	27	9	1	0	—		—		28	9
Triglav	Total		96	33	5	1	—		—		101	34
Churchill Brothers	2020–21	I-League	15	11	—		—		—		15	11
Bengaluru United	2021–22	Bangalore Super Division	12	15	—		—		7 (Note: Four appearances and one goal in Durand Cup, three appearances in I-League qualifiers)	1	19	16
Gokulam Kerala	2021–22	I-League	13	13	—		3 (Note: Appearances in AFC Cup)	2	—		16	15
Punjab	2022–23	I-League	20	16	3	0	—		—		23	16
Punjab	2023–24	Indian Super League	22	8	3	2	—		3 (Note: Appearances in Durand Cup)	0	28	10
Punjab	2024–25	Indian Super League	20	10	0	0	—		4	4	24	14
Punjab	Total		62	34	6	2	—		7	4	75	40
Career total			401	142	31	12	6	3	14	5	452	162

== Honours ==
Interblock

- Slovenian Cup: 2007–08, 2008–09
- Slovenian Supercup: 2008

Triglav Kranj

- Slovenian Second League: 2016–17

Churchill Brothers

- I-League runner-up: 2020–21

Bengaluru United

- Bangalore Super Division: 2021–22

Gokulam Kerala

- I-League: 2021–22

RoundGlass Punjab

- I-League: 2022–23

Individual

- I-League Player of the Season: 2022–23
- I-League top scorer: 2022–23
