= Manjit Sharma Kongbrailatpam =

Indian footballer

Manjit Sharma
Personal information
- Full name: Manjit Sharma Kongbrailatpam
- Date of birth: 3 March 1996 (age 30)
- Place of birth: Manipur, India
- Position: Centre-back

Team information
- Current team: Bengaluru United
- Number: 3

Senior career*
Years	Team	Apps	(Gls)
2019–2022	NEROCA	22	(0)
2022–2023	Sudeva Delhi	10	(0)
2023–	Bengaluru United	1	(0)
- * Club domestic league appearances and goals as of 21:09, 27 March 2023 (UTC)

Manjit Sharma Kongbrailatpam (Meitei: Kongbrailatpam Manjit Sharma, born 3 March 1996) is an Indian professional football player who plays as a defender for I-League 2 club Bengaluru United.

== Early life ==
Sharma was born on 3 March 1996 in India's northeastern state of Manipur.

== Career ==
=== NEROCA FC ===
==== 2019-20 ====
Sharma signed his first senior contract with I-League side NEROCA F.C. He would represent the club in 2019-20 I-League season. Sharma played his debut match on 14 March 2020 against Chennai City F.C. Sharma was started in the lineup for the match. He played the full 90 minutes. The game finished in a 2–2 draw. Sharma played just one game in total for the club at the end of the season.

==== 2020-21 ====
Sharma stayed with club for the 2020-21 I-League season. He played his first match of the season on 15 January 2021 against TRAU FC in a 1–1 draw as a substitute for Khaiminthang Lhungdim. He started in the lineup for the first time the season against Mohammedan SC on 3 February which ended in a 0–0 draw.

== Club statistics ==
=== Club ===
As of 27 March 2023

Club	Season	League			Cup		AFC		Total	
Club	Season	Division	Apps	Goals	Apps	Goals	Apps	Goals	Apps	Goals
NEROCA	2019–20	I-League	1	0	0	0	—		1	0
NEROCA	2020–21	I-League	9	0	0	0	—		9	0
NEROCA	2021–22	I-League	12	0	0	0	—		12	0
NEROCA	NEROCA total		22	0	0	0	0	0	22	0
Sudeva Delhi	2022–23	I-League	10	0	0	0	—		10	0
Bengaluru United	2022–23	I-League 2	1	0	0	0	—		1	0
Career total			33	0	0	0	0	0	33	0
