= Ambernath United Atlanta FC =

Indian association football club

Ambernath United
- Full name: Ambernath United
- Founded: 2011; 15 years ago
- Ground: Cooperage Ground, Mumbai
- Capacity: 5,000
- Owner: Deepu K.
- League: Mumbai Super League
- 2024–25: Mumbai Premier League, relegated
Home colours	Away colours

Ambernath United is an Indian professional football club based in Mumbai, Maharashtra. Previously created from a merger of Ambernath United and Atlanta, they competed in the MFA Elite Division. In 2023, Maharashtra Oranje FC took over Atlanta Football Club and earned the I-League 2 spot. Ambernath United later joined hands with Bombay Muslims to form Ambernath United-Bombay Muslims and competed in the Mumbai Premier League.

== History ==
Ambernath United Atlanta FC was created by a merger between Deepu K.'s Ambernath United and Allen Contractor's Atlanta FC in 2022. Atlanta FC Mumbai was playing in Elite Division before the merger, while Ambernath United was playing in local tournaments. Ambernath United Atlanta won the MFA Elite Division in their first year with a very dominant performance under coach Steven Dias, who was assistant coach of Odisha FC and interim coach of Jamshedpur FC, among others.

In the 2022–23 I-League 2, the club moved to championship round. They achieved third place, and failed to secure I-League promotion. In September 2023, Atlanta FC, which was 50% of Ambernath United Atlanta, was completely taken over by Oranje FC and renamed Maharashtra Oranje FC. Ambernath United later formed a union with Bombay Muslims to participate in the 2023–24 Mumbai Premier League.

== Women's team ==
Ambernath United women's team has been participating in the MDFA Women's League, under the name Mumbai Knights FC.

== Honours ==
=== Domestic league ===
- MFA Elite Division
  - Champions (2): 2021–22, 2022–23
- Harwood Champions League
  - Champions (1): 2021–22

=== Domestic cup ===
- Nadkarni Cup
  - Champions (1): 2023
