= 2021–22 BDFA Super Division =

BDFA Super Division
- Season: 2021–22
- Champions: Bengaluru United (2nd title)
- Biggest home win: Bangalore Eagles 6–1 ADE
- Biggest away win: ASC 0–8 Bengaluru United
- Highest scoring: ASC 0–8 Bengaluru United

The 2021–22 BDFA Super Division was the 19th season of the BDFA Super Division, the fourth tier league in Indian football system, and Karnataka's top-tier football league. Bengaluru United were the defending champions.

== Changes from last season ==
=== Relegated to A Division ===
- Income Tax FC

=== Promoted from A Division ===
- Kodagu FC
- Jawahar Union
- Bangalore United FC

== Regular season ==
=== League table ===
Pos	Team	Pld	W	D	L	GF	GA	GD	Pts	Qualification or relegation
1	Bengaluru United	14	12	2	0	54	2	+52	38	Champions and qualification to 2022–23 I-League 2
2	Kickstart FC	14	11	1	2	48	13	+35	34	
3	Bangalore Eagles	14	9	3	2	26	14	+12	30	
4	Bengaluru FC	14	7	4	3	38	17	+21	25	
5	Jawahar Union	14	6	5	3	18	10	+8	23	
6	MEG	14	6	5	3	29	23	+6	23	
7	ASC	14	6	3	5	22	25	−3	21	
8	Bangalore United FC	14	5	3	6	19	26	−7	18	
9	Kodagu FC	14	4	4	6	21	22	−1	16	
10	FC Deccan	14	4	4	6	12	29	−17	16	
11	Bangalore Independents	14	4	2	8	16	30	−14	14	
12	Students Union	14	2	7	5	15	20	−5	13	
13	Bangalore Dream United	14	3	2	9	10	20	−10	11	
14	Young Challengers	14	3	0	11	14	40	−26	9	
15	ADE	14	0	1	13	6	57	−51	1	Relegated to BDFA A Division, reinstated later to expand the league

Source: The Away End
Rules for classification: 1) points; 2) goal difference; 3) number of goals scored

== Statistics ==
=== Top scorers ===
Rank	Name	Club	Goals
1	(India) Anktih P	Kickstart FC	4
2	(India) Subhash Singh	FC Bengaluru United	3
3	(Slovenia) Luka Majcen	FC Bengaluru United	2
3	(India) Cletus Jacob	Bangalore Eagles	2
3	(India) Sudheer	Kickstart FC	2

=== Hat-tricks ===
Rank	Name	Club	Hat-tricks
1	(India) Anktih P	Kickstart FC	1
1	(India) Subhash	FC Bengaluru United	1

=== Clean sheets ===
Rank	Name	Club	Clean sheets
1	(India) Jayanth Kumar Krishnamurthy	Kickstart FC	1
1	(India) Srijith R	FC Bengaluru United	1

== See also ==
- 2021–22 season in state football leagues of India
  - 2021–22 Chennai Senior Division
  - 2021–22 Kerala Premier League
