= Damaitphang Lyngdoh =

Indian footballer

Personal information
- Date of birth: 7 October 2003 (age 23)
- Place of birth: Umlyngka, Meghalaya, India
- Height: 1.72 m (5 ft 8 in)
- Position: Midfielder

Team information
- Current team: Shillong Lajong
- Number: 8

Youth career
- 2017: Meghalaya
- 2017–2019: Bengaluru U16
- 2019–2020: Bengaluru U18

Senior career*
Years	Team	Apps	(Gls)
2020–2023	Bengaluru B	23	(2)
2021–2023	Bengaluru	3	(0)
2023–	Shillong Lajong	30	(1)
- * Club domestic league appearances and goals as of 23:44, 16 March 2025 (UTC)

Damaitphang Lyngdoh (born 7 October 2003) is an Indian professional footballer who plays as a midfielder for I-League club Shillong Lajong.

== Youth ==
=== Meghalaya State Team ===
Damaitphang and his friends made their way to the trails for Meghalaya state football team, much to his surprise the then 14-year-old got selected to represent his state in the sub-junior nationals which were being held in Kerala.

=== Bengaluru FC U-15, U-18 and B team ===
During the sub-junior national tournament of 2017, Damaitphang was caught by the eyes of then Bengaluru FC U-15 team's African head coach Suker (Abu Buker Sadiq) from Ghana, Africa and By the Head of Youth Development John kila. His goals tallied at 9, putting him among the joint top six scorers of the Junior League. As the season progressed, he kept on attracting more eyes and later was to promoted to the U-18 team and then to the B team.

== Career ==
=== Bengaluru FC ===
It was in March 2021 when the 17-year-old did enough in the B team to impress the new coach at helm, Marco Pezzaiuoli. He was soon asked to train with the senior team before being handed a ticket to Goa, as part of the squad for the 2021 AFC Cup campaign.

Damaitphang made his debut for the club on 14 April 2021 after he came as a substitute on 71st minute of the game against Tribhuvan Army, and became the youngest player to represent senior team of Bengaluru FC at the age of 17 years 190 days.

=== Shillong Lajong ===
In September 2023, Lyngdoh parted ways with Bengaluru FC and joined I-League side Shillong Lajong F.C. on 2-year contract.

== Personal life ==
The third of four sons, Damaitphang hails from Umlyngka, a tiny village in the East Khasi Hills of Meghalaya. His mother works a government job, while his father operates a taxi in the village. On days that went long, young Lyngdoh made his way to the only nine-a-side ground in his locality.

== Career statistics ==
=== Club ===
As of 29 July 2025

Club	Season	League			Cup		AFC		Others		Total	
Club	Season	Division	Apps	Goals	Apps	Goals	Apps	Goals	Apps	Goals	Apps	Goals
Bengaluru B	2019–20	I-League 2nd Division	4	0	–		–		–		4	0
Bengaluru B	2022	RFDL	7	0	–		–		–		7	0
Bengaluru B	2022–23	I-League 2nd Division	6	1	–		–		–		6	1
Bengaluru B	2023	RFDL	6	1	–		–		–		6	1
Bengaluru B	Total		23	2	0	0	0	0	0	0	23	2
Bengaluru	2020–21	Indian Super League	0	0	–		1 (Note: Appearance(s) in AFC Cup)	0	–		1	0
Bengaluru	2021–22	Indian Super League	3	0	–		–		5 (Note: Appearance(s) in Durand Cup)	0	8	0
Bengaluru	Total		3	0	0	0	1	0	5	0	9	0
Shillong Lajong	2023–24	I-League	13	1	–		–		–		13	1
Shillong Lajong	2024–25	I-League	17	0	–		–		3	0	20	0
Shillong Lajong	2025–26	I-League	0	0	–		–		2	1	2	1
Shillong Lajong	Total		30	1	0	0	0	0	5	1	35	2
Total			56	3	0	0	1	0	10	1	67	4
