= Shallum Pires =

Indian footballer

Personal information
- Date of birth: 24 August 1992 (age 34)
- Place of birth: Sanvordem, Goa, India
- Height: 1.70 m (5 ft 7 in)
- Position: Defender

Team information
- Current team: Churchill Brothers

Youth career
- Salcete
- Fransa-Pax
- 2006–2011: Dempo

Senior career*
Years	Team	Apps	(Gls)
2011–16	Dempo	113	(1)
2017–2018	Mumbai FC	5	(0)
2018–	Churchill Brothers		

International career
2005	India U13		
2006	India U14		
2007–2008	India U16		
- * Club domestic league appearances and goals

Shallum Pires (born 24 August 1992) is an Indian footballer who plays as a defender for Churchill Brothers in the I-League and the Goa Professional League.

== Career ==
Pires made his debut for Dempo in the I-League on 16 April 2011 against Pailan Arrows at the Fatorda Stadium. He scored the first goal of the match in the 5th minute to give Dempo the lead in a match they would go on to win 5–2. He then did not make his second appearance for the club for over a year till 15 December 2012 against Pune F.C. in which Dempo lost 5–1 and Pires came on as a substitute.

He appeared in 2024 Bhausaheb Bandodkar Memorial Cup in Goa, scored the only goal for Dempo in their opening match against A-League Men club Brisbane Roar on 24 August, in their 5–1 defeat.

== Career statistics ==
As of 27 April 2014

Club	Season	League		Federation Cup		Durand Cup		AFC		Total	
Club	Season	Apps	Goals	Apps	Goals	Apps	Goals	Apps	Goals	Apps	Goals
Dempo	2010–11	1	1	0	0	0	0	—	—	1	1
Dempo	2011–12	0	0	0	0	0	0	—	—	0	0
Dempo	2012–13	1	0	0	0	0	0	0	0	1	0
Dempo	2013-14	1	0	0	0	0	0	0	0	1	0
Dempo	2014-15	0	0	1	0	0	0	0	0	0	
Career total		3	1	0	0	0	0	0	0	3	1
