= FC Bengaluru United =

Indian association football club based in Bangalore

Bengaluru United
- Full name: Football Club Bengaluru United
- Nickname: The Red Ramparts
- Short name: FCBU
- Founded: 2018; 8 years ago
- Ground: Bangalore Football Stadium; Padukone – Dravid CSE
- Capacity: 8,400; 250
- Owner: Gaurav Manchanda
- Head coach: Nallappan Mohanraj
- League: Indian Football League; Karnataka Super Division
Home colours	Away colours	Third colours

Football Club Bengaluru United is an Indian professional football club based in Bangalore, Karnataka. The club currently competes in the Indian Football League, the second tier of the Indian football league system. Founded in 2018, the club mainly participated in local competitions, including the Karnataka Super Division.

Bengaluru United took part in the I-League 2nd Division for the first time in 2019–20 season. The club achieved its best ever finish in 2025-26 season, finishing second and earning promotion to the Indian Football League.

United Pro Football Schools (UPFS) is the academy and grassroots development program of FC Bengaluru United. UPFS focuses on technical, tactical, physical and mental development while providing players with structured pathway towards competitive and professional football.

== History ==
Bengaluru United was founded in 2018 and began playing in the BDFA Super Division for the 2018–19 season. Their first match was on 25 October 2018 against Kickstart FC where they were defeated 4–2. The club earned their first victory in their next match on 30 October against South United 3–0. After 13 matches, Bengaluru United finished their first season in fifth place on 23 points, 11 behind Bengaluru FC. Prior to the next season, Bengaluru United signed former India international Gouramangi Singh as a first-team coach under Richard Hood. The team started the Super Division 2019–20 season with a 4–1 victory over ASC. This time the club finished as runners-up, behind Bengaluru FC on goal difference.

In January 2020, it was announced that Bengaluru United would participate in the I-League 2nd Division, India's third-tier competition. The club were placed into Group C, alongside ARA, FC Kerala, and the reserve teams for Indian Super League clubs Goa, Kerala Blasters, and Mumbai City. Their first match in the national league was on 29 January 2020 against Goa at the Nagoa Ground. A goal from striker Amey Bhatkal gave Bengaluru United a 1–0 victory. Despite the performance, the COVID-19 pandemic in India managed to postpone the 2nd Division season from being concluded. The club were in second in the table from eight matches.

In March 2021, Bengaluru United was crowned champions of the 2020–21 season of the BDFA Super Division. The club finished atop the points table with 31 points, having won 10 out of their 12 matches.

"Kudos to our FC Bengaluru United boys who stayed on top of their game and remained steadfast in their commitment right through the league. Credit to all the coaches, support staff, and everyone who worked tirelessly behind the scenes to ensure game plans were in place, training sessions were on point, and the focus on winning was unwavering. I would also like to thank the KSFA for successfully organizing the league in what are undoubtedly unique and challenging circumstances. We had 13 teams participating and the league was extremely competitive, making it a great experience for players and those who watched the games as well!"

— Gaurav Manchanda, owner of FC Bengaluru United, after the team's historic BDFA Super Division win.

Ahead of the 2021–22 I-League Qualifiers, Bengaluru roped in Slovenian Luka Majcen as their third foreigner after the Trinidadian duo Robert Primus and Daniel Carr. They began 2021–22 season journey, with a 1–0 win against Central Reserve Police Force at the 2021 Durand Cup, but the journey ended after a 4–2 defeat to Mohammedan Sporting in semi-finals.

Bengaluru United retain the BDFA Super Division title, after winning the 2021–22 season, stacking up 13 wins and a draw. In May 2022, the club appointed Khalid Jamil as new head coach. In 2023, the club participated in Stafford Challenge Cup and clinched title defeating Chennaiyin FC (R) 2–1 in the final. In 2022–23 I-League 2, showcasing good form, the club progressed to the championship round, in which they failed to secure promotion to the I-League, finishing fourth. In 2023–24 season of BDFA Super Division League, Bengaluru United sealed third-place finish. The club later competed in 2023–24 I-League 2, achieved fourth place, earned 20 points and 6 wins in 14 matches.

== Kit manufacturers and shirt sponsors ==
Period	Kit manufacturer	Shirt sponsor
2019—2020	MS Sportswear	The Organic World
2020—2021	MS Sportswear	Nimida Group
2021—2022	SIX5SIX	Nimida Group
2022—2024	Hummel	Nimida Group
2025—	Hyve Sports	Nimida Group

== Stadium ==
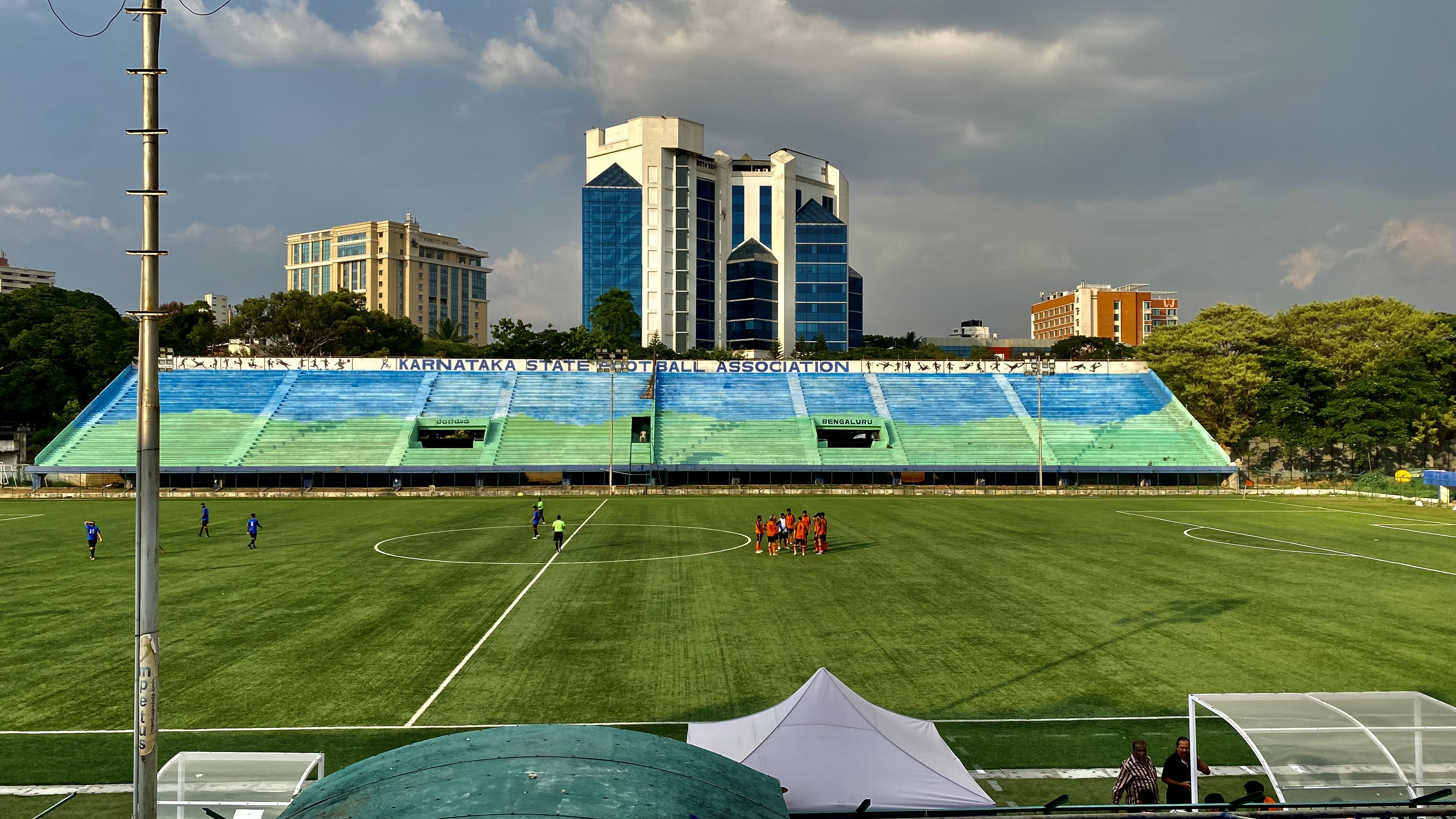
Bangalore Football Stadium on matchday in 2023

Bengaluru United initially played its home matches at the Bangalore Football Stadium. The stadium previously had a capacity of nearly 40,000 spectators. Opened in 1971, it currently has artificial turf.

In January 2024, the club announced to use Padukone – Dravid Centre for Sports Excellence as home venue for the I-League 2.

== Ownership ==
Bengaluru United has been owned by Gaurav Manchanda since its incorporation. The club is currently owned by Nimida United Sports Development Pvt Ltd.

== Rivalry ==
Bengaluru United shares rivalry with SC Bengaluru, a local outfit formed in 2022, whom they faced in matches of the BDFA Super Division League and the I-League 2.

== Players ==
=== First-team squad ===
As of 17 November 2026

Note: Flags indicate national team as defined under FIFA eligibility rules; some limited exceptions apply. Players may hold more than one non-FIFA nationality.

No.	Pos.	Nation	Player
1	GK	IND	Manjunath Hirekurbar
3	DF	IND	Arjun Gouda M
4	DF	IND	Abdul Hannan
5	DF	COL	Brayan Cundumí
6	MF	IND	Gautam Virwani
7	MF	IND	Chunsaba Bariam
8	MF	IND	Ribhav Sardesai
9	MF	IND	Naocha Singh Ngangbam
10	FW	IND	Akshunna Tyagi
11	FW	IND	Harmanpreet Singh
12	MF	IND	Dhruv Sharma
14	DF	IND	Lalhrezuala Sailung
15	MF	IND	Bidyananda Singh
16	DF	IND	Vijay Marandi

No.	Pos.	Nation	Player
17	MF	IND	Lalramdinsanga Ralte
18	GK	IND	R Srijith
19	FW	IND	Jakob Vanlalhlimpuia
21	MF	IND	Vinil Poojary
23	DF	IND	Nitesh Darjee
26	DF	IND	Shunjanthan Ragui
27	MF	IND	Jojo Zaihmingthanga
29	MF	COL	Maikol Herrera Casseres
31	GK	IND	Arman Tamang
34	FW	IND	Lijo K
45	GK	IND	Sangramjit Roy Chowdhury
82	DF	IND	Daniel Muthu
99	FW	RUS	Marat Tarek

== Coaching staff ==
Position	Name
Head coach	(India) Nallappan Mohanraj
Assistant coach	(India) Sibi Kumar
Goalkeeping coach	(India) Sunil Kumar HS
Strength and conditioning coach	(India) Vivek P
Physiotherapist	(India) Pehzaan Safarbadi

== Statistics and records ==
=== Season-by-season ===
As of 26 May 2023

Season	League									Finals	Cup	Asia	Top Scorer	
Season	Division	P	W	D	L	GF	GA	Pts	Position	Finals	Cup	Asia	Player	Goals
2018–19	BDFA Super Division	13	6	5	2	21	12	23	5th	—	—	—	—	
2019–20	BDFA Super Division	13	7	5	1	23	7	26	3rd	—	—	—	—	
2019–20	I-League 2nd Division	8	4	2	2	12	6	14	2nd	—	—	—	(India) Asrar Rehbar	3
2020–21	BDFA Super Division	12	10	1	1	38	7	31	Champions	—	—	—	—	
2020–21	I-League 2nd Division	3	0	2	1	4	6	2	4th	—	—	—	—	
2021–22	BDFA Super Division	14	12	2	0	54	2	38	Champions	—	—	—	(Slovenia) Luka Majcen	13
2022–23	I-League 2nd Division	12	7	2	3	24	8	23	4th	—	—	—	(India) Irfan Yadwad	13
2023-24	I-League 2	14	6	2	6	21	19	20	4th	—	—	—	(India) Jerry Pulamte	4
2024-25	I-League 2													

== Affiliated clubs ==
The following club is currently associated with FC Bengaluru United:

- (Spain) Sevilla FC (2021–present)

== Notable players ==
=== Past and present internationals ===
The following foreign players of Bengaluru United have been capped at senior/youth international level with their respective countries. Years in brackets indicate their spells at the club.

- (Trinidad and Tobago) Robert Primus (2020–2021)
- (Ghana) William Opoku (2020–2021)
- (Trinidad and Tobago) Daniel Clive Carr (2021)
- (Slovenia) Luka Majcen (2021)
- (Lebanon) Mohamad Kdouh (2022–2023)

== Managerial history ==
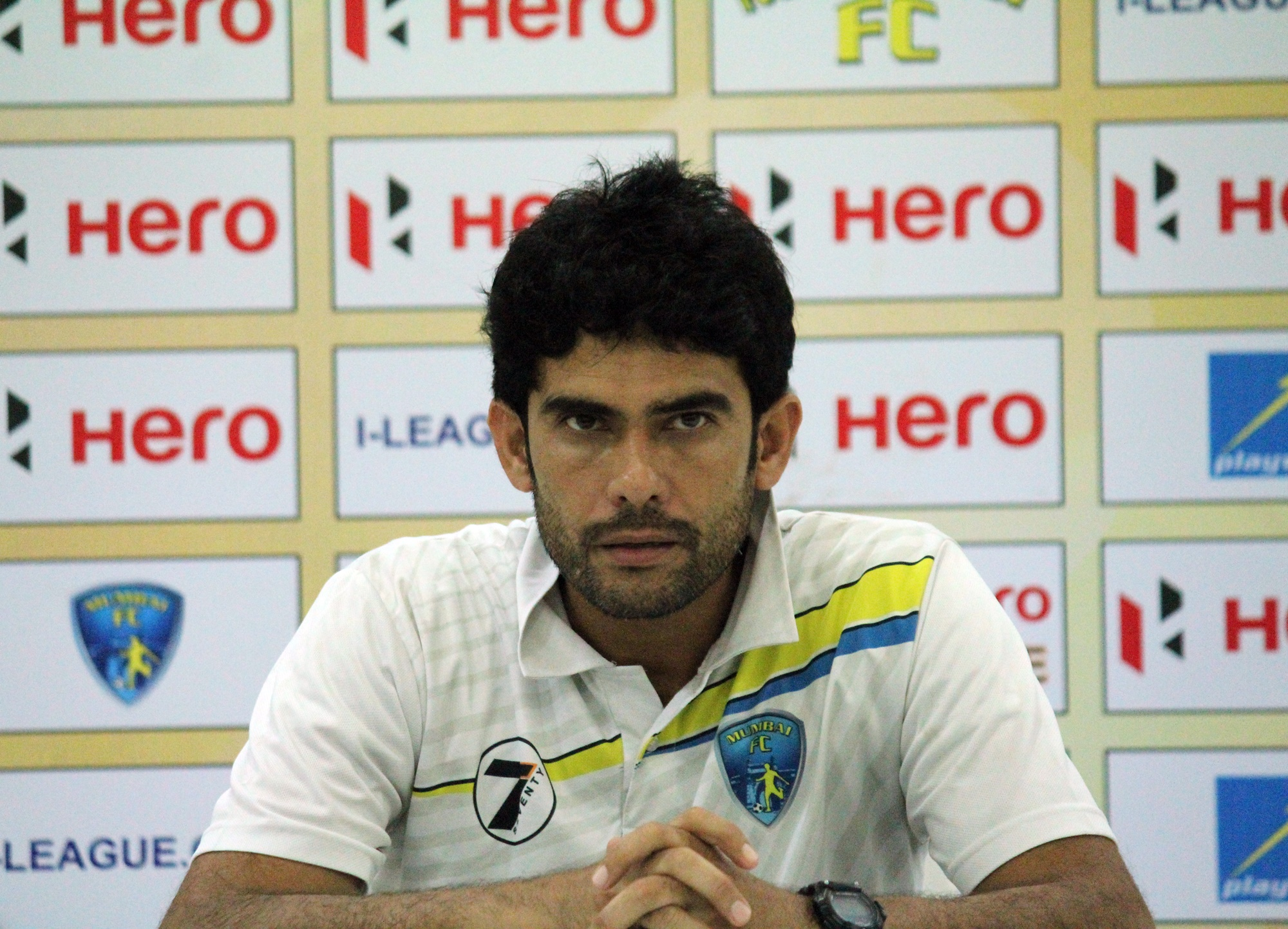
Khalid Jamil coached Bengaluru United in 2022–23 season

- (India) D. Manivannan (2018–2019)
- (India) Richard Reginald Hood (2019–2020; 2020–2022)
- (India) Gouramangi Singh (2020)
- (India) Khalid Jamil (2022–2023)
- (Spain) Fernando Santiago Varela (2023)
- (India) Sankarlal Chakraborty (2023–2024)
- (India) Samuel Sylvester (2024)
- (India) Nallappan Mohanraj (2024–present)

== Partnership ==
In 2021, FC Bengaluru United and La Liga side Sevilla FC have formalized their agreement to collaborate for the next five years. With this partnership agreement, Sevilla FC look to strengthen their presence in the Indian football market, one of the fastest growing markets in the world. They will also explore opportunities to establish shared football schools. Sevilla FC will assist the Indian club in various aspects, including sports management, data analysis, talent spotting, player development and performance optimization, and the use of sports technology.

For Bengaluru United, owned by Gaurav Manchanda, the agreement is intended to draw on the sporting experience of Sevilla. As part of the agreement, fans will see FC Bengaluru United and their academy players in the traditional white and red colours of Sevilla from the start of the 2021–22 season at the I-League 2nd Division.

== Other departments ==
=== Women's team ===
In March 2022, FC Bengaluru United marked their foray into women's football with the launch of their Women's team for KSFA B Division League. The team was launched on 8 March on Women's day and they represent the best in local talent and marks an important milestone in the growth and development of women's football in the state.

"The launch of the IWL marked an important step in the development of women's football in the country."

— —John Kenneth Raj, Technical director of FC Bengaluru United, after launching the teams women's side.

=== Youth men's ===
Bengaluru United has a youth men's football section, that competes primarily in the KSFA Youth League. Club's academy teams usually play under three age categories, U12, U14, and U17. Their U21 team participated in "south zone" qualifiers of the 2023 Reliance Foundation Development League.

== Honours ==
=== League ===
- I-League 2nd Division
  - Third place (1): 2019–20
- BDFA Super Division
  - Champions (2): 2020–21, 2021–22
  - Runners-up (1): 2022–23
  - Third place (2): 2019–20, 2023–24

=== Cup ===
- Stafford Challenge Cup
  - Champions (1): 2023

=== Award ===
- World Football Summit Award: 2021

== See also ==
- List of football clubs in India
