= East Bengal FC Reserves and Academy =

Reserve team and youth system of East Bengal FC

East Bengal Reserves
- Full name: East Bengal Football Club Reserves and Academy
- Nicknames: Lal Holud Brigade (The Red and Yellow Brigade); Moshal Bahini (The Torch Bearers); Bangal Brigade
- Short name: EBFC
- Ground: East Bengal Ground
- Capacity: 23,500
- Owner: East Bengal Club
- President: Murari Lal Lohia
- Head coach: Archisman Biswas (reserves)
- League: CFL Premier Division (reserves); RF Development League; AIFF Elite League
- Website: emamieastbengal.com
Home colours	Away colours

East Bengal Football Club Reserves and Academy, commonly referred to as East Bengal B, is the reserve team and youth system of the Indian Super League side East Bengal FC. Reserves generally consist of younger players, but at times senior players also play, if recuperating from injury or not getting first team game time. Apart from the I-League 2 (formerly), the reserve side plays in the Calcutta Football League.

== History ==
East Bengal FC Reserves and Academy are the under-21, under-17, under-15 and under-13 teams of East Bengal. The under-21 team is often the last stage before the promotion into the first team. The youth teams participate in the Elite league of various age groups. The East Bengal Academy was re-instated on 20 June 2016 with the motive to establish a strong footprint in Indian football by producing quality professional players. The main objective of this project has been to supply professional quality players to the East Bengal senior team & Indian national team.

The East Bengal Academy was founded in the early part of the 21st century and had a major success initially as the U-19 East Bengal team won the first two U-19 National Football leagues held in 2001-02 and 2002-03 and then the club's Under-15 team qualified for the Manchester United Premier Cup after being champions of India defeating Mahindra United 1–0 in the final, and becoming South–East Asian regional runners up in 2007. The Junior team faced the youth teams of Manchester United, A.S. Roma and Shandong Luneng and FK Austria Wien in the final round held in Manchester, however, they lost all the games in the group stages. In the 17–20th place play-off semi-finals, the team defeated Bukit Jalil of Malaysia by 3-1, but lost to Central United of New Zealand in the 17th place play-offs by 5-3 via tiebreakers, after the game ended goalless. The U-15 team finished 18th among the 20 teams who had reached the world final stage and is to date the best finish by any Indian club in the Nike Premier Cup. The East Bengal U-19 team was the primary youth team before the Elite League started in 2010. Players like Israil Gurung, Saikat Saha Roy etc. were part of the East Bengal youth setup in the mid 2000s. In 2006, former East Bengal legend and National League winning coach Monoranjan Bhattacharya was appointed as the head coach of the East Bengal U-19 team.

The East Bengal Academy started with new endeavours in 2016 as they brought in Ranjan Chowdhury as head of the project with an aim to produce Indian talents and build up the supply line for the main team of East Bengal. The team finished runners-up in the 2016–17 I-League U18, losing 2-1 to AIFF Elite Academy in the final. The team also reached the semi-final in 2017–18. The team was disbanded after the 2019–20 Indian Elite League was called off due to COVID-19 pandemic in India. In 2022, after the new investors Emami Group joined the club, the youth teams have been revived

== Reserve team ==
East Bengal officially did not have a reserve team prior to 2020. However, the club formed a reserve team composed of academy players and few senior team members to participate in minor tournaments like Bordoloi Trophy. In 2018, the East Bengal Reserves team coached by Ranjan Chowdhury won the Darjeeling Gold Cup, defeating another Kolkata giant Mohammedan Sporting in the final.

The reserve team was formed in 2020 and intended to play in the I-League 2, along with the Calcutta Football League from the 2020–21 season. However, due to the COVID-19 pandemic in India, the team was scrapped and after new investors Emami group tied up with the club, the reserve team was once again launched in 2022. Former Kerala football team coach Bino George was appointed as the head coach of the reserve team. The club also recruited former captain Sangram Mukherjee as the goalkeeper coach for the team. The club also bolstered the squad by making some top signings from the Santosh Trophy teams, including five players from Kerala, the champions of the 2021–22 edition. The reserve participated in the 2022 Calcutta Premier Division and finished fourth in the Super Six. The reserve team also participated in the 2022–23 I-League 2 along with the reserve teams of other Indian Super League sides – Bengaluru FC, Chennaiyin FC, FC Goa, Hyderabad FC and Mumbai City FC. The club also roped in AFC A license holder Archisman Biswas as the assistant coach for the reserve side. In the first season, East Bengal reserves side finished third in the group behind United and Shillong Lajong.

== Reserve squad ==
The below list contains the names and details of the reserve team squad for East Bengal. Some of the players are also part of the first team squad.
As of 25 November 2025

No.	Name	Nat.	Pos.	Date of birth (age)	Signed from	Signed in	Contact ends	Apps	Goals
Goalkeepers
27	Aditya Patra (captain)	(India)	GK	27 April 2000 (age 26)	(India) Bengaluru	2022	2026	29	0
50	Julfikar Gazi	(India)	GK	6 May 2006 (age 20)	(India) Bengal Football Academy	2024	2027	0	0
95	Gourab Shaw	(India)	GK	4 May 2004 (age 22)	(India) Calcutta Port Trust	2023	2026	5	0
Defenders
54	Adil Amal	(India)	CB	31 January 2002 (age 24)	(India) Mar Athanasius FA	2022	2026	14	2
57	Bathala Sunil	(India)	CB	20 August 2003 (age 23)	(India) Sreenidhi Deccan	2024	2027	7	1
63	Monotosh Chakladar	(India)	CB	4 April 1998 (age 28)	(India) Diamond Harbour	2024	2026	16	0
69	Sonam Tsewang Lhokham	(India)	LB	28 November 2006 (age 19)	(India) Jamshedpur	2025	2027	2	0
72	Bikram Pradhan	(India)	RB	2 April 1999 (age 27)	(India) Bhawanipore	2025	2027	13	0
85	Chaku Mandi	(India)	CB	11 May 2000 (age 26)	(India) Bhawanipore	2024	2027	18	1
90	Joseph Justin	(India)	CB	30 October 2004 (age 21)	(India) Parappur FC	2023	2026	19	0
Midfielders
30	Vanlalpeka Guite	(India)	AM	26 October 2006 (age 19)	(India) Aizawl	2023	2026	24	7
54	Ananthu N. S.	(India)	AM	20 September 2004 (age 22)	(India) Parappur FC	2024	2027	12	2
58	Sanjib Ghosh	(India)	RW	31 July 2000 (age 26)	(India) Mohammedan Sporting	2022	2025	31	1
61	Tanmay Das (vice–captain)	(India)	CM	2 May 2001 (age 25)	(India) Railway FC	2022	2027	44	3
64	Naseeb Rahman	(India)	RW	19 October 2002 (age 23)	(India) FC Areacode	2023	2026	22	3
66	Shyamal Besra	(India)	CM	25 September 2004 (age 22)	(India) Calcutta FC	2022	2027	27	6
68	Kush Chhetry	(India)	CM	28 November 2004 (age 21)	(India) Muvanlai Athletics	2023	2026	10	0
70	Muhammed K. Ashique	(India)	RW	6 December 2004 (age 21)	(India) Muthoot FA	2023	2026	10	2
71	Muhammed Roshal P. P.	(India)	RW	8 March 2003 (age 23)	(India) Wayanad United	2023	2026	20	0
75	Aman C. K.	(India)	RW	19 March 2003 (age 23)	(India) Mumbai City	2022	2026	47	10
77	Sanjoy Oraw	(India)	CM	12 April 2002 (age 24)	(India) Suruchi Sangha	2025	2028	3	0
79	Abinash Shagolsem	(India)	AM	2 July 2007 (age 19)	(India) FC Mangalore	2024	2027	2	0
80	Ajad Saheem T.	(India)	AM	15 December 2002 (age 23)	(India) Golden Threads	2024	2026	13	1
81	Suman Dey	(India)	LM	10 February 2003 (age 23)	(India) Kasba Samannoy	2023	2026	18	1
83	Koustav Dutta	(India)	RW	18 April 2002 (age 24)	(India) Kalighat MS	2023	2026	3	0
84	Sayan Banerjee	(India)	LW	14 January 2003 (age 23)	(India) Kalighat MS	2023	2026	44	11
87	Bijay Murmu	(India)	RW	2 December 2000 (age 25)	(India) Bhawanipore	2024	2027	11	0
Forwards
52	Debojit Roy	(India)	FW	26 November 2007 (age 18)	(India) East Bengal U-17	2024	2029	1	0
55	Muhammed Ashiq S	(India)	FW		(India) Kerala United	2025	2026	4	1
56	Monotos Maji	(India)	FW	13 September 1999 (age 27)	(India) Bhawanipore	2025	2027	5	2
59	Jesin TK	(India)	FW	19 February 2000 (age 26)	(India) Kerala United	2022	2026	46	26
73	Anthony Andrews	(India)	FW	24 December 2005 (age 20)	(India) SAI Centre Kollam	2022	2026	1	0

== Coaching staff ==
Role	Name
Head coach	(India) Archisman Biswas
Assistant coach	(India) Barun Sengupta
Goalkeeper coach	(India) Sangram Mukherjee
Physiotherapist	(India) MD Shakil
Head of performance & video analyst	(India) Aromal Vijayan
Team manager	(India) Pratim K. Saha

== Under-21 ==
The East Bengal U-21 team participates in the Reliance Foundation Development League, the national U-21 tournament from 2023. The reserve team head coach Bino George has been in charge of the U-21 squad. On 14 March 2024, in the first RFDL game, East Bengal defeated United SC. On 21 April 2023, East Bengal defeated arch-rivals Mohun Bagan U-21 2–0 to become the East zone champions and qualify for the national group stage in their very first season in the RFDL. East Bengal finished second in the national group stage and ended their maiden campaign. In 2024, East Bengal once again became the East Zone champions, and finished runner-up in the 2024 RFDL losing 3–2 in the final against Punjab. East Bengal U-21 qualified for the 2024 Next Gen Cup to be held in Birmingham, United Kingdom along with Punjab and Muthoot FA from India.

=== Squad ===
As of 14 April 2024

Note: Flags indicate national team as defined under FIFA eligibility rules; some limited exceptions apply. Players may hold more than one non-FIFA nationality.

No.	Pos.	Nation	Player
1	GK	IND	Rohit Goyat
4	DF	IND	Prajjal Saha
10	FW	IND	Debojit Roy
13	GK	IND	Prabhsukhan Singh Gill (U-23)
30	MF	IND	Vanlalpeka Guite
35	MF	IND	Gurnaj Singh Grewal
40	DF	IND	Tingku Kangujam (U-23)
53	DF	IND	Arpan Polley (U-23)
54	DF	IND	Adil Amal (U-23)
61	MF	IND	Tanmay Das (U-23)
62	MF	IND	Aman C. K.
63	MF	IND	Muhammed Roshal P P
64	MF	IND	Naseeb Rahman (U-23)
65	DF	IND	Rahul Naskar (U-23)
66	MF	IND	Shyamal Besra
67	FW	IND	Sourav Biswas (U-23)
70	FW	IND	Avishek Kunjam
73	MF	IND	Razibul Mistry

No.	Pos.	Nation	Player
74	DF	IND	Bunando Singh Khangembam
75	GK	IND	Ranit Sarkar
80	DF	IND	Malsawmtluanga Hrasel
81	FW	IND	Suman Dey
82	FW	IND	Vishnu P. V. (U-23)
84	MF	IND	Sayan Banerjee
85	DF	IND	Nayan Tudu
86	DF	IND	Tuhin Paul
87	FW	IND	Faizan Waheed
88	DF	IND	Abhishek Baxla
89	MF	IND	Muhammed Musharaf
90	DF	IND	Joseph Justin
92	DF	IND	Naorem Borish Singh
93	DF	IND	Priyoka Thounaojam
94	DF	IND	Manabir Basumatary
95	GK	IND	Gourab Shaw
96	FW	IND	Chabungbam Linky Meitei
97	FW	IND	Kartick Oraon

=== Performance record ===
As of 28 January 2026

Performance of East Bengal Academy in Reliance Foundation Development League
Year	Regional Qualifiers	Zonal Group Stage	National Group Stage	National Championship	Next Gen Cup	Ref
2022	Did not participate					
2023	—	Champions	2nd	Did not qualify	Did not qualify	
2024	—	Champions	Champions	Runner-up	8th	
2025	2nd	Champions	6th	Did not qualify	Did not qualify	
2026	Champions	2nd	to be decided	to be decided	to be decided	

== Under-18 ==
The under-18 team participates in the U17 Youth Cup.

The National Football League U-19 was launched in 2001 and the East Bengal U-19 team won the inaugural edition defeating India sub-juniors 3–2 in the final. The U-19 team defended the title the following year as they defeated JCT Football Academy 1–0 in the final. The team also finished runners-up in the 2003–04 edition as they lost to their rivals Mohun Bagan U-19 3–1 in the penalty shoot-out after the final ended 0–0 in regulation time. After the tournament was restarted as the I-League U19 in 2008 and later renamed to Elite League, the East Bengal team became runners-up four times, failing to win to the title. In 2022, the tournament was redesigned as a U-17 category, after not being held for two seasons due to the COVID-19 pandemic. In 2024, the team clinched Kolkata leg of the Dream Sports Championship title defeating United SC in final.

=== Squad ===
As of 28 January 2026

Note: Flags indicate national team as defined under FIFA eligibility rules; some limited exceptions apply. Players may hold more than one non-FIFA nationality.

No.	Pos.	Nation	Player
1	GK	IND	Aniket Kar
2	DF	IND	MD Yusuf
4	DF	IND	Prajjal Saha
5	DF	IND	Haru Roy
7	MF	IND	Ajay Sahani
8	MF	IND	Mohammed Yasin
9	FW	IND	Raj Jyoti Majhi
10	FW	IND	Debojit Roy
11	MF	IND	Sumit Durlov
12	DF	IND	Ashish Roy
13	MF	IND	Pradip Mishra
14	MF	IND	Md Afjal
15	MF	IND	Sujoy Pal
16	MF	IND	Mainak Saha
17	MF	IND	Roktim Jana

No.	Pos.	Nation	Player
18	MF	IND	Dipu Sardar
19	MF	IND	Nababrata Baul Das
20	DF	IND	Naorem Ibungo Singh
21	MF	IND	Salman Dewan
22	MF	IND	Debobrato Roy Choudhary
23	MF	IND	Ranit Mondal
24	DF	IND	Sk Riyajul Islam
25	MF	IND	Alfred Lalrinpuia
26	DF	IND	Kartik Hansda
27	GK	IND	Deep Barman
28	MF	IND	Gopal Das
35	MF	IND	Gunraj Singh Grewal
55	GK	IND	Sutirtha Das
99	GK	IND	Koushik Chhatui

=== Coaching staff ===
As of 18 December 2023

Role	Name
Head coach	(India) Barun Sengupta
Assistant coach	(India) Hirak Saha
Physiotherapist	(India) Ankan Roy Chowdhury
Team manager	(India) Aritra Dutta
Assistant team manager	(India) Arun Kumar Jaiswal

=== Performance record ===
As of 15 January 2024

Performance of East Bengal Academy in Youth Leagues
Year	Tournament	Final Position	Ref
2001	National Football League U-19	Champions	
2002–03	National Football League U-19	Champions	
2003–04	National Football League U-19	Not Held	
2004–05	National Football League U-19	Runners-up	
2005–07	National Football League U-19	Not Held	
2008	I-League U19	Quarter-Finals	
2009	I-League U19	Not Held	
2010	I-League U19	Runners-up	
2011	I-League U19	Runners-up	
2012	I-League U-20	Group Stages	
2013	I-League U-20	Final Round	
2014	I-League U19	Runners-up	
2014–15	I-League U19	Group Stages	
2015–16	I-League U-18	Final Round	
2016–17	I-League U-18	Runners-up	
2017–18	Youth League U-18	Semi-Finals	
2018–19	Elite League U-18	Quarter-Finals	
2019–20	Elite League U-18	Abandoned (Note: League called-off due to the COVID-19 pandemic.)	
2020–22	Elite League U-18	Not Held	
2022–23	U17 Youth Cup	Group Stages	
2023–24	U-17 Youth League	Disqualified (Note: East Bengal was disqualified after fielding an overaged player in the league.)	
2024–25	U-17 Youth League	Group Stages	
2025–26	Elite League U-18	Group Stages	

== Under-15 ==
The under-15 team participates in the Elite Youth League.

=== Squad ===
As of 26 July 2019

Note: Flags indicate national team as defined under FIFA eligibility rules; some limited exceptions apply. Players may hold more than one non-FIFA nationality.

No.	Pos.	Nation	Player
1		IND	Firaz Molla
2		IND	Avigit Hansda
3		IND	Susobhan Naskar
4		IND	Shafik Sk.
5		IND	Sagar Porel
6		IND	Shib Sundar Tudu
7		IND	Akhay Dey
8		IND	Chiranjit Ghosh
9		IND	Kinkar Golui
10		IND	Rupam Biswas
11		IND	Jit Halder
12		IND	Soumyadip Jyoti
13		IND	Sagnik Ray
14		IND	Toufik Islam

No.	Pos.	Nation	Player
15		IND	Argha Manna
16		IND	Rohit Singh
17		IND	Tohit Laskar
18		IND	Baburam Mandi
19		IND	Ajibur Rahaman Molla
20		IND	Tritam Lodh
21		IND	Rajkumar Kisku
22		IND	Silton Bhattacharjee
23		IND	Ayan Das
24		IND	Mohammad Taha Tanvir
25		IND	Barun Sarma
26		IND	Sattwick Mandal
27		IND	Preetam Roy
28		IND	Kaioum Ali

=== Performance record ===
Performance of East Bengal Academy in U-15 Youth Leagues
Year	Tournament	Final Position
2005-06	U-15 Nike Premier Cup	Runners
2006-07	U-15 Nike Premier Cup	Champions
2015-16	U-15 Nike Premier Cup	Zonal Round
2016-17	U-15 Nike Premier Cup	Zonal Round
2017-18	U-15 Nike Premier Cup	National Finals
2018-19	U-15 Hero Junior League	National Playoffs
2019-20	U-15 Hero Junior League	Disqualified (League called-off due to the COVID-19 pandemic)

==== Matches at the 2007 Nike Premier Cup ====
Win Draw Loss

1 August 2007 Group stage	Manchester United U15	5–0	East Bengal U15	Manchester
09:30 BST	Nicholas Jackson 11'; David Mellor 17', 28', 38'; Rory Gorman 20'	Report		Stadium: Carrington

1 August 2007 Group stage	Shandong Luneng U15	3–0	East Bengal U15	Manchester
14:30 BST	??	Report		Stadium: Carrington

2 August 2007 Group stage	FK Austria Wien U15	2–0	East Bengal U15	Manchester
09:30 BST	David 11'; Christoph 15'	Report		Stadium: Carrington

2 August 2007 Group stage	AS Roma U15	2–0	East Bengal U15	Manchester
15:30 BST	Mattia Montini 2', 42'	Report		Stadium: Carrington

3 August 2007 17-20th Semi Final	East Bengal U15	3–1	Bukit Jalil U15	Manchester
09:30 BST	Suprovan Dhar 4'; Ajoy Ray 7', 20'	Report	Fouzan 30'	Stadium: Carrington

3 August 2007 17-20th Final	East Bengal U15	0–0 (3–5 p)	Central United U15	Manchester
11:30 BST		Report		Stadium: Carrington
	Penalties
	Rakesh Roy (penalty scored); Supravan Dhar (penalty scored); Joydeb Chakraborty (penalty scored); Pintu Dutta (penalty missed)		Penalty scored

== Under–13 ==
The under–13 team participates in the Elite Youth League.

=== Squad ===
As of 20 April 2024

Note: Flags indicate national team as defined under FIFA eligibility rules; some limited exceptions apply. Players may hold more than one non-FIFA nationality.

No.	Pos.	Nation	Player
1	GK	IND	Sayan Sarkar
13	GK	IND	Sk Samim
30	GK	IND	Ayush Ghosh
2	DF	IND	Koustav Das
5	DF	IND	Raj Limbu
20	DF	IND	Sanjit Sardar
22	DF	IND	Sisir Sarkar
7	MF	IND	Arnab Halder
17	MF	IND	Abhara Dey
25	MF	IND	Rimo Saha

No.	Pos.	Nation	Player
8	MF	IND	Jeet Samanta
24	MF	IND	Raktiam Roy
29	MF	IND	Dipak Mondal
21	MF	IND	Sayan Paik
28	MF	IND	Bijay Bala
11	MF	IND	Anuruddha Das
16	MF	IND	Ranajit Ghosh
18	MF	IND	Saptadeep Das
9	FW	IND	Manab Marjit
19	FW	IND	Chand Khatrapal

=== Performance record ===
Performance of SC East Bengal Academy in U-13 Youth Leagues
Year	Tournament	Zonal Round	National Finals	Top Scorer	Goals	Ref
2017–18	U-13 Hero Sub Junior League	4th	Did not qualify	Souvik Dari; Jit Sarkar	2	
2018–19	U-13 Hero Sub Junior League	2nd	Did not qualify	Rajibul Halder	3	
2019–20	U-13 Hero Sub Junior League	League called-off due to the COVID-19 pandemic		Avijit Kotal	3	
2023–24	U-13 Sub Junior Youth League	Champions	To be decided	Sisir Sarkar	12	

== Noted graduates ==
=== Those who made it at the club ===
East Bengal's youth system has been successful over the last few years; many players who have come through it have gone on to feature in the first-team. The following players have risen up the ranks from the under age teams and gone on to play over ten competitive matches for the first team.

Players who have represented the National team are in Bold.

**2000s**

- (India) **Anupam Sarkar**
- (India) Kingshuk Debnath
- (India) Priyant Singh
- (India) Saikat Saha Roy
- (India) Gouranga Biswas
- (India) Budhiram Tudu
- (India) **Gurpreet Singh Sandhu**

**2010s**

- (India) Abhinas Ruidas
- (India) **Seiminlen Doungel**
- (India) Jiten Murmu
- (India) **Mehtab Singh**
- (India) Prakash Sarkar
- (India) Manoj Mohammed
- (India) Bidyashagar Singh
- (India) PC Rohlupuia

**2020s**

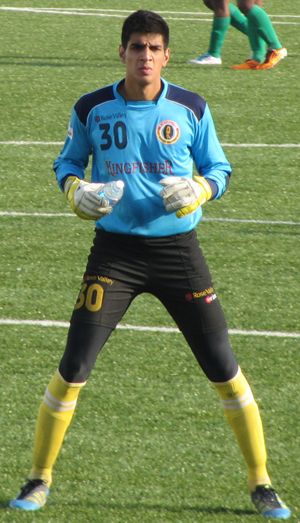
Gurpreet Singh Sandhu playing for East Bengal senior team

- (India) Ankit Mukherjee
- (India) Hira Mondal
- (India) Dip Saha

=== Those who made it elsewhere ===
East Bengal FC academy graduates who didn't make it at the club but made it somewhere else and even went on to play for the national team:

Players who have represented the National team are in Bold.

**2000s**

- (India) Arup Debnath
- (India) Israil Gurung

**2010s**

- (India) **Milan Singh**
- (India) Pankaj Moula
- (India) Ankit Mukherjee
- (India) Rafique Ali Sardar

**2020s**

- (India) Telem Suranjit Singh
- (India) Salam Johnson Singh
- (India) Bikash Singh Sagolshem
- (India) Saurav Mandal

== Honours ==
=== Reserves ===
- Darjeeling Gold Cup (1): (gold) 2018
- Madhyamgram MLA Cup (1): (gold) 2023
- Kulodakanta Memorial Shield (1): (gold) 2023
- Chief Minister's Cup (1): (silver) 2024
- Dream Sports Championship runners-up: 2024

=== Academy U18 ===
- IFA Shield (Note: Under-19 Tournament from 2015–2018) (1): (gold) 2018
- National Football League U-19 (2): (gold) 2001, (gold) 2002–03
- AIFF Youth Leagues (Runners up) (4): (silver) 2010, (silver) 2011, (silver) 2014, (silver) 2016-17
- Zee Bangla Football League (U-19) (1): (gold) 2019(Joint Winners)
- SRMB Cup (U-18) (1): (gold) 2019
- All Bengal Knockout Tournament (U-19) (1): (gold) 2019

=== Academy U-16 ===
- Gothia Cup: (silver) 1996

=== Academy U-15 ===
- Manchester United Premier Cup India: (gold) 2007
