= 2023–24 Bengaluru FC B season =

7th season in the existence of Bengaluru FC B

Bengaluru FC B
2023–24 season
- Chairman: Parth Jindal
- Manager: Bibiano Fernandes
- Stadium: Bangalore Football Stadium
- Bangalore Super Division: Champions (3rd title)
- Puttaiah Memorial Cup: Round of 16
- Development League: Fourth
- Top goalscorer: League: Malemngamba Thokchom (11 goals); All: Malemngamba Thokchom (17 goals)
- Biggest win: 11–0 (vs Rebels FC)
- Biggest defeat: 3–0 (vs South United)
Home colours	Away colours
- All statistics correct as of 18 March 2024.

The 2023–24 season was Bengaluru FC B's seventh season as a reserve side of Bengaluru FC since its establishment in 2017. The club began its season with defeat at the Puttaiah Memorial Cup's round of 16 in August, before going on to win the Bangalore Super Division title for the third time in history.

Later in the season, Bengaluru B participated in the Developmental League as defending champions for the second consecutive time, for a place in the Premier League's Next Gen Cup.

== Background ==
After finishing fifth in the Bangalore Super Division, Bengaluru B then participated in the 2023 Reliance Foundation Development League as defending champions and with only single defeat to their record, they were successful in defending the title after beating Sudeva Delhi in the final on penalties.

In this season, Bengaluru B underwent through changes with the likes of head coach Jan Van Loon departing for the Director of Bengaluru FC Academy role. Replacing him was Bibiano Fernandes who led India national under-17 teams in the two AFC U-17 Asian Cups.

=== Transfers in ===
No.	Position	Player	Previous club	Date	Fee
	DF	(India) Manjot Singh Dhami	(India) Shri Dashmesh Sports Academy	1 June 2023	Free
61	FW	(India) Shashwat Panwar	(India) BBFS U-18	1 June 2023	Free
58	DF	(India) Suraj Kumar Singh	(India) SAI Guwahati	1 June 2023	Free
59	DF	(India) Ricky Meetei	(India) Eastern Sporting Union	1 June 2023	Free
57	MF	(India) Malemngamba Singh Thokchom	(India) SAI Utlou	1 June 2023	Free

==== Promoted from youth system ====
No.	Position	Player	Previous club	Date	Fee
55	MF	(India) Lalpekhlua	(India) Bengaluru FC U-18	1 June 2023	Internal transfer (Youth system)

=== Transfers out ===
After the departure of Mandar Tamhane, the former CEO of Bengaluru FC to NorthEast United, the team saw a number of players signing for NorthEast United. Some of the players signed for I-League clubs in search for more game time, while five players were promoted to the senior side.

No.	Position	Player	Outgoing club	Date	Fee	Ref
9	FW	(India) Rahul Raju	(India) Gokulam Kerala	22 June 2023	Free agent	
3	DF	(India) Harpreet Singh	(India) Namdhari	1 July 2023	Free agent	
66	FW	(India) Fredy	(India) NorthEast United	27 July 2023	Free agent	
12	MF	(India) Shighil Nambrath	(India) NorthEast United	27 July 2023	Undisclosed	
6	MF	(India) Kamalesh P	(India) Bengaluru United	1 August 2023	Free agent	
1	GK	(India) Dipesh Chauhan	(India) NorthEast United	18 August 2023	Free agent	
42	FW	(India) Akashdeep Singh	(India) Namdhari	26 August 2023	Undisclosed	
8	FW	(India) Bekey Oram	(India) NorthEast United	31 August 2023	Free agent	

==== Promoted to Bengaluru FC ====
No.	Position	Player	Outgoing club	Date	Fee	Ref
44	DF	(India) Robin Yadav	(India) Bengaluru FC	1 June 2023	Internal transfer (Youth system)	
38	FW	(India) Ankith Padmanabhan	(India) Bengaluru FC	1 August 2023	Internal transfer (Youth system)	
49	MF	(India) Harsh Patre	(India) Bengaluru FC	31 August 2023	Internal transfer (Youth system)	
51	DF	(India) Chingambam Shivaldo Singh	(India) Bengaluru FC	1 December 2023	Internal transfer (Youth system)	
41	FW	(India) Monirul Molla	(India) Bengaluru FC	1 June 2023	Internal transfer (Youth system)	

== Players ==
Bengaluru B has 53 players under contract with 28 of them being selected for Super Division and 15 of them for Development League; the following list of players is subject to change during the transfer season.

=== Players under contract ===
No.	Name	Nationality	Position	Date of Birth (Age)	Since	Until	Picked for BSD	Picked for RFDL
Goalkeepers
30	Sahil Poonia	(India)	GK	8 March 2006 (age 20)	2023	2024	Yes	Yes
33	Vikram Lakhbir Singh	(India)	GK	6 July 1993 (age 32)	2023	2024	Yes	No
60	Ishan Gyan	(India)	GK				Yes	Yes
72	Rohen Narengbam	(India)	GK	1 February 2008 (age 18)	2022	2024	Yes	Yes
85	Shuhaid Koya Thangal	(India)	GK				No	Yes
88	Prithviraj Dash	(India)	GK				No	Yes
Defenders
42	Clarence Fernandes	(India)	DF	25 July 2004 (age 21)	2022	2025	Yes	Yes
43	Felixson Conny Fernandes	(India)	CB	28 January 2003 (age 23)	2022	2025	Yes	Yes
50	Vinith Venkatesh	(India)	DF	31 July 2005 (age 20)	2023	2025	Yes	Yes
51	Chingambam Shivaldo Singh	(India)	CB	13 June 2004 (age 21)	2023	2025	Yes	Yes
53	Ashik Adhikari	(India)	DF	17 January 2007 (age 19)	2022	2024	No	Yes
58	Suraj Kumar Singh	(India)	DF	28 June 2006 (age 19)	2023	2026	Yes	Yes
59	Ricky Meetei	(India)	DF	30 August 2006 (age 19)	2023	2026	Yes	Yes
62	Manjot Singh Dhami	(India)	DF	25 October 2006 (age 19)	2023	2026	Yes	Yes
67	Niwash Limbu	(India)	DF	29 June 2008 (age 17)			No	Yes
73	Newton Ningthoujam	(India)	DF	28 February 2008 (age 18)	2022	2024	Yes	Yes
79	Atharv Ranadevi	(India)	DF				No	Yes
Midfielders
28	Amay Morajkar	(India)	DMF	20 June 2000 (age 25)	2019	2024	Yes	No
45	Lalremtluanga Fanai	(India)	DMF	17 September 2004 (age 21)	2020	2026	Yes	Yes
46	Sai Yashwant Reddy Panthy	(India)	RMF	19 November 2003 (age 22)	2022	2025	Yes	Yes
47	Rashid CK	(India)	AMF	12 June 2004 (age 21)	2022	2026	Yes	Yes
49	Harsh Shailesh Patre	(India)	DMF	25 January 2003 (age 23)	2023	2025	No	Yes
52	Lalhmingchhuanga Fanai	(India)	MF	11 January 2006 (age 20)	2022	2024	Yes	Yes
54	Basudev CM	(India)	MF	30 January 2007 (age 19)	2022	2024	Yes	Yes
55	Lalpekhlua	(India)	MF	30 April 2007 (age 19)	2023	2026	Yes	Yes
56	Oinam Ronex Meitei	(India)	MF	25 July 2007 (age 18)	2019	2024	Yes	Yes
57	Malemngamba Singh Thokchom	(India)	MF	15 October 2007 (age 18)	2023	2024	Yes	Yes
64	Aarav Gharat	(India)	MF	26 January 2008 (age 18)	2022	2024	No	Yes
69	Bankitlyngkor Diengdoh	(India)	MF	16 December 2007 (age 18)	2022	2024	No	Yes
78	Arnav Raghavan	(India)	MF				No	Yes
83	Swastik Chand	(India)	MF				No	Yes
Forwards
24	Rohit Danu	(India)	CF	10 July 2002 (age 23)	2023	2026	No	Yes
29	Ashish Jha	(India)	LW	15 July 1999 (age 26)	2023	2025	Yes	No
37	Taorem Kelvin Singh	(India)	FW	22 November 2005 (age 20)	2023	2024	No	Yes
38	Ankith Padmanabhan	(India)	CF	16 August 2001 (age 24)	2023	2025	Yes	Yes
41	Monirul Molla	(India)	CF	1 May 2005 (age 21)	2023	2026	Yes	Yes
48	Satendra Yadav	(India)	CF	30 March 2003 (age 23)	2022	2025	Yes	Yes
61	Shashwat Panwar	(India)	CF	21 December 2006 (age 19)	2023	2026	Yes	Yes
63	Cyrus Abhilash	(India)	CF	31 December 2008 (age 17)	2022	2024	Yes	Yes
68	Tomthinganba Sanjenbam	(India)	CF	28 December 2007 (age 18)	2022	2024	Yes	Yes
70	Vivaan Dey	(India)	FW	9 March 2007 (age 19)			No	Yes
74	Muhammad Zahan	(India)	FW				No	Yes
82	Saarang Srinivasan Chary	(India)	FW				No	Yes

== Personnel ==
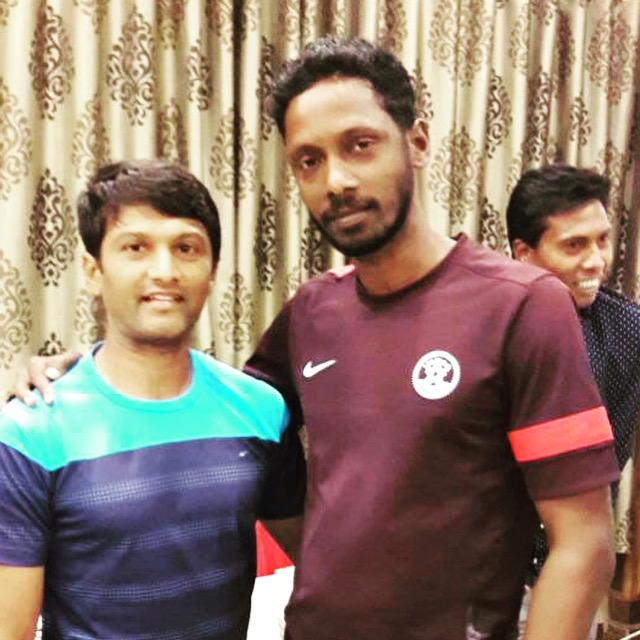
Bibiano Fernandes with a youth player.

Position	Name
Head coach	(India) Bibiano Fernandes
Assistant coach	(India) Kaizad Ambapardiwalla
Physiotherapist	(India) Rahul CR
Video analyst	(India) Prateek Chopra
Goalkeeping Coach	(India) Parshuram Salwadi
S&C Coach	(India) Nishad Nagaraj
Kit Manager	(India) Krishna Khati

== Competitions ==
=== Overview ===
Competition	First match	Last match	Starting round	Final position	Record							
Competition	First match	Last match	Starting round	Final position	Pld	W	D	L	GF	GA	GD	Win %
Super Division	1 September 2023	21 November 2023	Matchday 1	Champions	18	16	2	0	57	9	+48	88.89
Puttaiah Memorial Cup	5 August 2023		Round of 16	Round of 16	1	0	0	1	0	3	−3	0.00
RFDL	19 February 2024	TBD	Regional qualifiers	TBD	14	10	2	2	36	7	+29	71.43
Total					33	26	4	3	93	19	+74	78.79

Last updated: 21 April 2024
Source: Competitions

=== Bangalore Super Division ===
==== League Table ====
Pos	Team	Pld	W	D	L	GF	GA	GD	Pts	Qualification or relegation
1	Bengaluru B (Note: Bengaluru FC B being a reserve side are ineligible for promotion and will instead participate in the RFDL.) (C)	18	16	2	0	57	9	+48	50	Champions
2	SC Bengaluru (Note: SC Bengaluru have qualified for the 2023–24 I-League 2 via finishing in the top three of 2023–24 I-League 3 play-offs round.)	18	16	0	2	61	7	+54	48	
3	Bengaluru United (Note: FC Bengaluru United are in the 2023–24 I-League 2, the third tier of Indian football league system.)	18	14	3	1	51	16	+35	45	
4	HAL SC	18	10	3	5	31	19	+12	33	Eligible for 2024-25 I-League 3
5	Roots	18	10	2	6	30	19	+11	32	

Source: BDFA Instagram
Rules for classification: 1) points; 2) goal difference; 3) number of goals scored
(C) Champions

==== Results by round ====
Matchday	1	2	3	4	5	6	7	8	9	10	11	12	13	14	15	16	17	18
Result	W	W	W	D	W	W	W	W	W	W	W	W	W	W	W	W	W	D
Position	15	9	5	7	7	6	2	1	1	1	1	1	1	1	1	1	1	1

Source: KSFA
A = Away; H = Home; W = Win; D = Draw; L = Loss

==== Matches ====
1 September 2023 1	MEG	0–1	Bengaluru B	Bengaluru
15:30 IST		Report	Lalpekhlua 90'	Stadium: Bangalore Football Stadium

7 September 2023 2	Bengaluru B	2–1	HAL SC	Bengaluru
13:30 IST	Clarence 14'; Satendra 59'	Report	Austin 51' (pen.)	Stadium: Bangalore Football Stadium

10 September 2023 3	Bengaluru B	6–0	Deccan	Bengaluru
13:30 IST	Rashid 24', 29', 32'; Lalpekhlua 65'; Monirul 74'; Amay 80'	Report	Austin 51' (pen.)	Stadium: Bangalore Football Stadium

17 September 2023 4	Bengaluru B	2–2	South United	Bengaluru
13:30 IST	Rashid 21'; Satendra 90+4'	Report	Suraj 30'; Altab 72'	Stadium: Bangalore Football Stadium

24 September 2023 5	Kickstart	0–2	Bengaluru B	Bengaluru
15:30 IST		Report	Shivaldo 53'; Satendra 83'	Stadium: Bangalore Football Stadium

2 October 2023 6	ASC & CFC	0–3	Bengaluru B	Bengaluru
13:30 IST		Report	Satendra 8'; Rashid 16'; Amay 90+5'	Stadium: Bangalore Football Stadium

5 October 2023 7	SC Bengaluru	1–2	Bengaluru B	Bengaluru
13:30 IST	Shaikh 45+1'	Report	Ankith 13'; Ronex 83'	Stadium: Bangalore Football Stadium

9 October 2023 8	Bengaluru B	4–0	Bangalore Dream United	Bengaluru
13:30 IST	Ankith 1'; Thockhom 30'; Amay 51'; Satendra 90+1'	Report		Stadium: Bangalore Football Stadium

12 October 2023 9	Real Chikkamagaluru	1–4	Bengaluru B	Bengaluru
15:30 IST	Praful 15'	Report	Thockhom 45+2', 54', 74'; Rashid 81'	Stadium: Bangalore Football Stadium

15 October 2023 10	FC Agniputhra	0–2	Bengaluru B	Bengaluru
13:30 IST		Report	Amay 2', 42'	Stadium: Bangalore Football Stadium

19 October 2023 11	Bengaluru B	2–0	Roots FC	Bengaluru
15:30 IST	Thokchom 3'; Amay 28'	Report		Stadium: Bangalore Football Stadium

25 October 2023 12	Bangalore United FC	1–2	Bengaluru B	Bengaluru
13:30 IST	Konthoujam 90+3'	Report	Satendra 10'; Thokchom 13'	Stadium: Bangalore Football Stadium

30 October 2023 13	Bengaluru B	2–1	Students Union	Bengaluru
15:30 IST	Satendra 18'; Clarence 62'	Report	Pratik 45+6'	Stadium: Bangalore Football Stadium

3 November 2023 14	Kodagu FC	1–4	Bengaluru B	Bengaluru
13:30 IST	Shlok 45+2'	Report	Satendra 6'; Thokchom 11', 46'; Vinith 17'	Stadium: Bangalore Football Stadium

9 November 2023 15	Bengaluru B	6–0	Young Challengers	Bengaluru
9:30 IST	Satendra 27', 47'; Shreyas 36'; Amay 38'; Thokchom 40', 65'	Report		Stadium: Bangalore Football Stadium

14 November 2023 16	Bangalore Independents	1–2	Bengaluru B	Bengaluru
13:30 IST	Pradison 63'	Report	Thokchom 19'; Rashid 74'	Stadium: Bangalore Football Stadium

17 November 2023 17	Bengaluru B	11–0	Rebels FC	Bengaluru
15:30 IST	Ankith 17', 39', 59'; Clarence 26'; Amay 34', 69'; Thokchom 44'; Lalpekhlua 76'; Ronex 78'; Shashwat 87'	Report		Stadium: Bangalore Football Stadium

21 November 2023 18	Bengaluru B	0–0	Bengaluru United	Bengaluru
15:30 IST		Report		Stadium: Bangalore Football Stadium

=== Puttaiah Memorial Cup ===
==== Round of 16 ====
5 August 2023 Round of 16	South United	3–0	Bengaluru B	Bengaluru
13:45 IST	Hussain 45'; Ronex 62' (o.g.); Zimik 88'	Report		Stadium: Bangalore Football Stadium

=== Reliance Foundation Development League ===
==== South zone ====
Pos	Team	Pld	W	D	L	GF	GA	GD	Pts	Qualification
1	Bengaluru	10	7	1	2	28	6	+22	22	Advance to National group stage
2	Roots FC	10	6	1	3	15	7	+8	19	Advance to National group stage
3	Chennaiyin	10	6	1	3	17	13	+4	19	Advance to National group stage
4	Sreenidi Deccan	10	5	2	3	17	10	+7	17	
5	Kickstart FC	10	2	3	5	16	23	−7	9	
6	Snipers FC	6	0	1	5	4	20	−16	1	
7	Rebels FC	6	0	1	5	3	21	−18	1	

Source: RFDL

19 February 2024 Stage 1, Match 1	Bengaluru B	6–0	Kickstart B	Bengaluru
09:15 IST	Malemngamba 8', 51', 62'; Kelvin 41'; Danu 47'; Newton 61'			Stadium: HAL Football Ground

22 February 2024 Stage 1, Match 2	Bengaluru B	4–0	Snipers B	Bengaluru
09:15 IST	Monirul 28', 44', 62'; Suraj 43'; Thokchom 90+1'			Stadium: HAL Football Ground

26 February 2024 Stage 1, Match 3	Roots B	0–1	Bengaluru B	Bengaluru
12:30 IST			B.P. Aniket 57' (o.g.)	Stadium: HAL Football Ground

1 March 2024 Stage 1, Match 4	Bengaluru B	6–0	Rebels B	Bengaluru
09:30 IST	Satendra 13'; Kelvin 29', 56'; Monirul 40'; Malemngamba 83', 88'			Stadium: HAL Football Ground

4 March 2024 Stage 1, Match 5	Sreenidi Deccan B	1–1	Bengaluru B	Bengaluru
12:30 IST	Sunil 84'		Monirul 58'	Stadium: HAL Football Ground

11 March 2024 Stage 1, Match 6	Chennaiyin B	0–2	Bengaluru B	Bengaluru
09:15 IST			Rashid 63'; Kelvin 75'	Stadium: HAL Football Ground

18 March 2024 Stage 2, Match 1	Bengaluru B	4–1	Kickstart B	Bengaluru
09:15 IST	Clarence 18'; Monirul 56'; Kelvin 65'; Ronex 80'		Borish 45+2'	Stadium: HAL Football Ground

21 March 2024 Stage 2, Match 2	Bengaluru B	1–2	Chennaiyin B	Bengaluru
12:45 IST	Monirul 59'		Lijo 6'; Prakadeswaran 34'	Stadium: HAL Football Ground

24 March 2024 Stage 2, Match 3	Sreenidi Deccan B	1–3	Bengaluru B	Bengaluru
12:45 IST	Ningkhlaw 82'		Molla 36', 40'; Rashid 70'	Stadium: HAL Football Ground

27 March 2024 Stage 2, Match 4	Roots B	1–0	Bengaluru B	Bengaluru
09:15 IST	Mukunthan 49'		Molla 36', 40'; Rashid 70'	Stadium: HAL Football Ground

==== Nationals ====
Pos	Team	Pld	W	D	L	GF	GA	GD	Pts	Qualification	BFC	RYC	DEM	CFC	KRB
1	Bengaluru (Q)	4	3	1	0	8	1	+7	10	Advance to National championship stage	—	0–0	—	2–0	—
2	RFYC (H)	4	3	1	0	8	2	+6	10		—	—	4–1	3–1	—
3	Dempo SC	4	1	1	2	2	6	−4	4		0–2	—	—	1–0	—
4	Chennaiyin	4	1	0	3	3	7	−4	3		—	—	—	—	2–1
5	Kerala Blasters	4	0	1	3	2	7	−5	1		1–4	0–1	0–0	—	—

Source: RFDL
Rules for classification: 1) Points; 2) Goal difference; 3) Head-to-head points; 4) Head-to-head goal difference
(H) Hosts; (Q) Qualified for the phase indicated

===== Group A =====
12 April 2024 Match 1	Bengaluru B	4–1	Kerala Blasters B	Navi Mumbai
19:30 IST	Monirul 19', 23', 75'; Satendra 90+11'		Korou 59'	Stadium: Reliance Corporate Park

15 April 2024 Match 2	Bengaluru B	0–0	RFYC	Navi Mumbai
16:00 IST				Stadium: Reliance Corporate Park

18 April 2024 Match 3	Dempo B	0–2	Bengaluru B	Navi Mumbai
16:00 IST			Monirul 81'; Kelvin 83'	Stadium: Reliance Corporate Park

21 April 2024 Match 4	Bengaluru B	2–0	Chennaiyin B	Navi Mumbai
16:00 IST	Monirul 43'; Malemngamba 90+2'			Stadium: Reliance Corporate Park

===== Championship stage =====
14 May 2024 Semifinal 2	Bengaluru B	–	Punjab B	Navi Mumbai
17:00 IST				Stadium: Reliance Corporate Park

== Statistics ==
=== Goalscorer ===
Rank	No.	Pos	Nat	Player	BSD	PMC	RFDL	Total
1	57	MF	(India)	Malemngamba Thokchom	11	0	7	18
2	41	CF	(India)	Monirul Molla	1	0	13	14
2	48	CF	(India)	Satendra Yadav	10	0	2	12
3	48	DMF	(India)	Amay Morajkar	9	0	0	9
3	47	AMF	(India)	Rashid CK	7	0	2	9
4	38	CF	(India)	Ankith Padmanabhan	5	0	0	5
4	37	FW	(India)	Kelvin Singh	0	0	6	6
5	42	DF	(India)	Clarence Fernandes	3	0	1	4
7	26	CF	(India)	Oinam Ronex	2	0	1	3
6	55	MF	(India)	Lalpekhlua	2	0	0	2
7	51	CB	(India)	Chingambam Shivaldo Singh	1	0	0	1
7	50	DF	(India)	Vinith Venkatesh	1	0	0	1
7	61	CF	(India)	Shashwat Panwar	1	0	0	1
7	24	FW	(India)	Rohit Danu	0	0	1	1
7	73	DF	(India)	Newton Singh	0	0	1	1
7	58	MF	(India)	Suraj Kumar Singh	0	0	1	1
Own goals					0	0	1	1
TOTALS					57	0	36	93

Updated: 21 April 2024

=== Clean sheets ===
Rank	No.	Pos	Nat	Player	BSD	PMC	RFDL	Total
1	30	GK	(India)	Sahil Poonia	7	0	6	13
2	46	GK	(India)	Rohen Narengbam	2	0	0	2
2	88	GK	(India)	Prithviraj Dash	0	0	2	2
3	48	GK	(India)	Vikram Lakhbir Singh	1	0	0	1
TOTALS					10	0	5	15

Updated: 21 April 2024

== See also ==
- 2023–24 Bengaluru FC season
- List of Bengaluru FC seasons
