= 2023–24 Indian Youth League =

U17 football league in India

Youth League
- Season: 2023–24
- Dates: 13 December 2023 – 25 May 2024
- Champions: Classic FA (2nd title)
- Matches: 192
- Goals: 768 (4 per match)
- Top goalscorer: Md Mahmad Sami (Sudeva Delhi) (11 goals)
- Biggest home win: Zinc Football Academy 11–0 SAG Football Academy (23 December); Rajasthan United 11–0 SAG Football Academy (18 January)
- Biggest away win: Kenkre 0-13 Mumbai City (24 January)
- Highest scoring: Kenkre 0-13 Mumbai City (24 January)

The 2023–24 Youth League, also known as the 2023–24 U-17 Youth League, was the fourteenth season of the Indian Youth League and the second season of the under-17 category.

== Changes in format ==
- 54 teams were divided into eleven groups based on the zones.
  - Groups A, C, D, E, F, and H had 5 teams.
  - Groups B and G had 6 teams.
  - Groups I, J, and K had 4 teams.
- The tournament would take place in home and away round-robin format (except in centralized I and J groups) in the group stage.
- After group stage, group winners from A-H groups and runners-up from B and G groups directly advance to the final round.
- Group winners from I-K groups and runners-up from A, C, D, E, F, and H groups advance to Playoff round split into three single round-robin groups of three clubs each.
- After playoff-round, three Playoff group winners and runners-up; advance to final round which is further split into four single round-robin groups of 4 clubs each.
- After Final round, the group winners and runners-up advance to knockout round.

== Teams ==
Club	State/Region	Group	Home
Brothers Sports Association	Maharashtra	A	Barnes school and Junior College, Nashik, Maharashtra
Kenkre FC	Maharashtra	A	CPOE, Kharghar, Navi Mumbai
Reliance Foundation Young Champs	Maharashtra	A	Reliance Corporate Park, Ghansoli, Navi Mumbai
Mumbai City	Maharashtra	A	Cooperage Ground, Churchgate, Mumbai
Oranje FC	Maharashtra	A	Cooperage Ground, Churchgate, Mumbai
Mohun Bagan SG	West Bengal	B	Mohun Bagan Ground, Maidan, Kolkata
United SC	West Bengal	B	Kalyani Stadium, Kalyani, West Bengal
East Bengal Club	West Bengal	B	Bibhutibhushan Bandyopadhyay Stadium, Barrackpur Cantonment, West Bengal
Mohammedan SC	West Bengal	B	Mohammedan Sporting Ground, Kolkata, West Bengal
Odisha FC	Odisha	B	OSAP 7th Battalion, Bhubaneswar, Odisha
Sports Odisha	Odisha	B	Capital Ground, Bhubaneswar, Odisha
Football 4 Change Academy	Manipur	C	MFA Ground, Shillong, Meghalaya
NorthEast United	Assam	C	Polo Ground, Shillong, Meghalaya
Harisinga Town Club	Assam	C	Kokrajhar DSA Stadium, Kokrajhar, Assam
Shillong Lajong	Meghalya	C	SSA Stadium, Shillong, Meghalaya
Aizawl FC	Mizoram	C	MFA Ground, Shillong, Meghalaya
FC Goa	Goa	D	Monte de Guirim Football Ground, Guirim, Goa
Churchill Brothers FC	Goa	D	Benaulim Football ground, Benaulim, Goa
Dempo SC	Goa	D	Dempo Sports Ground, Goa
Belagavi United Football Academy	Karnataka	D	Sporting planet sports complex, Belagavi, Karnataka
Football Club Mangalore	Karnataka	D	Yenepoya University ground, Mangalore, Karnataka
Muthoot Football Academy	Kerala	E	Muthoot Football Academy, Mongam, Malappuram, Kerala
Parappur FC	Kerala	E	Thrissur Corporation Stadium, Thrissur, Kerala
Gokulam Kerala	Kerala	E	EMS Corporation stadium, Kozhikode, Kerala
Kerala Blasters	Kerala	E	Panampilly Nagar Ground, Panampilly Nagar, Kochi
Snipers Football Club	Karnataka	E	HAL, Bengaluru, Karnataka
Alchemy International FA	Karnataka	F	Padukone Dravid Centre for Sports Excellence, Bettahalasur, Bengaluru
Bengaluru FC	Karnataka	F	Bangalore Football Stadium, Bengaluru, Karnataka
Kickstart FC	Karnataka	F	Bangalore Football Stadium, Bengaluru, Karnataka
Chennaiyin FC	Tamil Nadu	F	Sri Ramachandra Medical College, Porur, Chennai, Tamil Nadu
FC Madras	Tamil Nadu	F	FC Madras Academy, Mahabalipuram, Tamil Nadu
Sudeva Delhi FC	Delhi	G	Sudeva Football Academy, Civil Lines, Delhi
Delhi FC	Delhi	G	Minerva Academy, Mohali, Punjab
Bhaichung Bhutia Football Schools	Delhi	G	Vedas International School, Sohna, Haryana
Namdhari Sports Academy	Punjab	G	Sri Bhaini Sahib Ground, Ludhiana, Punjab
Punjab FC	Punjab	G	SUS Football Ground, Tangori, Punjab
Bunkerhill	Haryana	G	Bunkerhill MSC Soccer Schools, Darbaripur, Haryana
Baroda Football Academy	Gujarat	H	VMC Sports Complex, Manjalpur, Gujarat
SAG Football Academy	Gujarat	H	SRPF Group II Football Ground, Naroda, Gujarat
ARA FC	Gujarat	H	SRPF Group II Football Ground, Naroda, Gujarat
Rajasthan United	Rajasthan	H	Poornima University, Jaipur, Rajasthan
Zinc Football Academy	Rajasthan	H	MKM Stadium, Zawar, Rajasthan
Corbett FC	Uttarakhand	I	Amenity Sport Academy Ground, Rudrapur, Uttarakhand
K.R Football Leaders Club	Uttarakhand	I	Amenity Sport Academy Ground, Rudrapur, Uttarakhand
Madan Maharaj	Madhya Pradesh	I	Amenity Sport Academy Ground, Rudrapur, Uttarakhand
Himalayan FC	Himachal Pradesh	I	Amenity Sport Academy Ground, Rudrapur, Uttarakhand
Subroto XI	Delhi	J	Kishore Bharati Krirangan, Kolkata, West Bengal
Sreenidi Deccan	Telangana	J	Kishore Bharati Krirangan, Kolkata, West Bengal
Jamshedpur	Jharkhand	J	Kishore Bharati Krirangan, Kolkata, West Bengal
Bengal Football Academy	West Bengal	J	Kishore Bharati Krirangan, Kolkata, West Bengal
Classic Football Academy	Manipur	K	Loitang Football Arena, Imphal, Manipur
NEROCA	Manipur	K	Khuman Lampak Main Stadium, Imphal, Manipur
TRAU	Manipur	K	Khuman Lampak Main Stadium, Imphal, Manipur
TYDA	Manipur	K	Toubul Mamang Playground, Toubul, Manipur

== Group stage ==
=== Group A ===
Pos	Team	Pld	W	D	L	GF	GA	GD	Pts	Qualification	RFYC	MCI	BRO	KFC	TOFC
1	Reliance Foundation Young Champs	8	7	1	0	35	1	+34	22	Final round	—	0–0	2–0	9–1	9–0
2	Mumbai City	8	6	1	1	24	5	+19	19	Playoff round	0–2	—	2–1	3–1	3–1
3	Brothers Sports Association	8	4	0	4	15	8	+7	12		0–2	0–1	—	6–0	4–0
4	Kenkre FC	8	1	1	6	12	43	−31	4		0–9	0–13	1–2	—	8–0
5	Oranje FC	8	0	1	7	2	31	−29	1		0–2	0–2	0–2	1–1	—

Updated to match(es) played on 14 January 2024. Source: AIFF

=== Group B ===
Pos	Team	Pld	W	D	L	GF	GA	GD	Pts	Qualification	EBFC	MBSG	USC	OFC	MSC	SOD
1	East Bengal Club	10	8	1	1	27	9	+18	25	Disqualified (Note: Disqualified from league on grounds of age fraud.)	—	0–0	3–2	3–2	3–2	6–0
2	Mohun Bagan SG	10	7	1	2	13	6	+7	22	Final round	0–4	—	1–0	3–0	1–0	2–0
3	United SC	10	6	2	2	18	9	+9	20	Final round	2–1	2–0	—	2–2	3–0	1–1
4	Odisha FC	10	4	1	5	16	18	−2	13		0–3	0–2	1–2	—	2–1	5–2
5	Mohammedan SC	10	2	0	8	8	19	−11	6		0–2	0–1	0–3	0–2	—	3–1
6	Sports Odisha	10	0	1	9	6	27	−21	1		1–2	0–3	0–1	0–2	1–2	—

Updated to match(es) played on 14 January 2024. Source: AIFF

=== Group C ===
Pos	Team	Pld	W	D	L	GF	GA	GD	Pts	Qualification	F4C	SHI	NEU	AIZ	HTC
1	Football 4 Change Academy	8	5	1	2	25	9	+16	16	Final round	—	1–0	3–1	2–3	4–0
2	Shillong Lajong	8	4	2	2	21	11	+10	14	Playoff round	3–3	—	5–2	1–0	6–1
3	NorthEast United	8	3	3	2	14	13	+1	12		2–1	2–2	—	1–1	2–1
4	Aizawl FC	8	3	2	3	13	14	−1	11		0–4	1–4	0–0	—	4–2
5	Harisinga Town Club	8	1	0	7	5	31	−26	3		0–7	1–0	0–4	0–4	—

Updated to match(es) played on 14 February 2024. Source: AIFF

=== Group D ===
Pos	Team	Pld	W	D	L	GF	GA	GD	Pts	Qualification	DSC	GOA	FCM	BUFA	CBFC
1	Dempo SC	8	6	2	0	17	3	+14	20	Final round	—	2–1	5–1	2–0	4–0
2	FC Goa	8	4	1	3	16	8	+8	13	Playoff round	0–1	—	4–1	4–1	4–1
3	Football Club Mangalore	8	3	3	2	9	12	−3	12		0–0	1–0	—	2–2	0–0
4	Belgaum United Football Academy	8	1	2	5	9	16	−7	5		0–2	1–1	0–2	—	4–1
5	Churchill Brothers FC	8	1	2	5	6	18	−12	5		1–1	0–2	1–2	2–1	—

Updated to match(es) played on 25 January 2024. Source: AIFF

=== Group E ===
Pos	Team	Pld	W	D	L	GF	GA	GD	Pts	Qualification	MUT	KER	SNI	GOK	PAR
1	Muthoot Football Academy	8	6	1	1	30	10	+20	19	Disqualified (Note: Disqualified from league on grounds of age fraud.)	—	2–3	3–1	5–0	10–0
2	Kerala Blasters FC	8	5	1	2	23	12	+11	16	Final round	3–4	—	2–0	4–1	6–0
3	Snipers Football Club	8	2	2	4	11	13	−2	8	Playoff round	1–2	2–2	—	0–0	5–1
4	Gokulam Kerala	8	2	2	4	11	18	−7	8		2–2	2–3	1–2	—	2–1
5	Parappur FC	8	2	0	6	6	28	−22	6		0–2	1–0	2–0	1–3	—

Updated to match(es) played on 11 January 2024. Source: AIFF

=== Group F ===
Pos	Team	Pld	W	D	L	GF	GA	GD	Pts	Qualification	BEN	CHE	MAD	ALC	KIC
1	Bengaluru FC	8	6	1	1	21	6	+15	19	Final round	—	2–1	3–0	0–0	1–0
2	Chennaiyin FC	8	5	2	1	17	9	+8	17	Playoff round	2–1	—	1–1	3–2	5–0
3	FC Madras	8	3	2	3	14	18	−4	11		0–4	0–1	—	4–3	3–2
4	Alchemy International FA	8	2	2	4	14	18	−4	8		1–5	1–1	1–3	—	2–1
5	Kickstart FC	8	0	1	7	11	26	−15	1		2–5	2–3	3–3	1–4	—

Updated to match(es) played on 11 January 2024. Source: AIFF

=== Group G ===
Pos	Team	Pld	W	D	L	GF	GA	GD	Pts	Qualification	PUN	SUD	DEL	BHA	BHK	NAM
1	Punjab FC	10	8	1	1	33	8	+25	25	Final round	—	1–4	3–1	3–0	5–0	9–0
2	Sudeva Delhi FC	10	6	2	2	33	10	+23	20	Final round	9–0	—	1–0	1–1	8–2	1–0
3	Delhi FC	10	6	0	4	30	11	+19	18		0–2	6–1	—	3–0	4–0	2–2
4	Bhaichung Bhutia Football Schools	10	5	1	4	28	18	+10	16		4–2	2–3	4–2	—	6–3	1–0
5	Bunkerhill	10	2	0	8	11	46	−35	6		0–2	0–8	0–6	0–4	—	3–2
6	Namdhari Sports Academy	10	1	0	9	7	49	−42	3		0–5	0–6	2–1	2–1	1–3	—

Updated to match(es) played on 25 January 2024. Source: AIFF

=== Group H ===
Pos	Team	Pld	W	D	L	GF	GA	GD	Pts	Qualification	ZIN	RAJ	BAR	ARA	SAG
1	Zinc Football Academy	8	6	2	0	41	1	+40	20	Final round	—	0–0	4–0	10–0	11–0
2	Rajasthan United	8	6	2	0	31	3	+28	20	Playoff round	0–0	—	4–3	0–8	11–0
3	Baroda Football Academy	8	4	0	4	16	16	0	12		1–4	0–2	—	4–0	2–0
4	ARA FC	8	2	0	6	5	29	−24	6		0–4	0–6	2–3	—	2–1
5	SAG Football Academy	8	0	0	8	1	45	−44	0		1–0	0–7	3–0	0–1	—

Updated to match(es) played on 11 January 2024. Source: AIFF

=== Group I ===
Pos	Team	Pld	W	D	L	GF	GA	GD	Pts	Qualification	CFC	HFC	KRFL	MMA
1	Corbett FC	6	6	0	0	31	1	+30	18	Playoff round	—	5–1	6–0	4–0
2	Himalayan FC	6	2	1	3	9	12	−3	7		0–2	—	0–0	0–4
3	K.R Football Leaders Club	6	0	2	4	1	19	−18	2		0–5	0–4	—	1–1
4	Madan Maharaj	6	2	1	3	9	18	−9	7		0–9	1–4	3–0	—

Updated to match(es) played on 30 April 2024. Source: AIFF

=== Group J ===
Pos	Team	Pld	W	D	L	GF	GA	GD	Pts	Qualification	SRD	JFC	BFA	SXI
1	Sreenidi Deccan	6	4	2	0	11	5	+6	14	Playoff round	—	1–0	2–1	1–1
2	Jamshedpur	6	2	3	1	9	6	+3	9		2–2	—	1–1	1–0
3	Bengal Football Academy	6	0	4	2	8	12	−4	4		0–3	2–2	—	3–3
4	Subroto XI	6	0	3	3	6	11	−5	3		1–2	0–3	1–1	—

Updated to match(es) played on 30 April 2024. Source: AIFF

=== Group K ===
Pos	Team	Pld	W	D	L	GF	GA	GD	Pts	Qualification	CFA	TYDA	TRAU	NER
1	Classic Football Academy	6	4	1	1	16	4	+12	13	Playoff round	—	2–2	3–1	7–0
2	TYDA	6	3	1	2	23	10	+13	10		0–3	—	5–1	6–0
3	TRAU	6	3	0	3	11	13	−2	9		0–1	4–3	—	2–1
4	NEROCA	6	1	0	5	2	25	−23	3		1–0	0–7	0–3	—

Updated to match(es) played on 4 February 2024. Source: AIFF

== Playoff round ==
All matches to be played at Tilak Maidan, Vasco da Gama and Utorda Ground, Mormugoa.

=== Group 1 ===
Pos	Team	Pld	W	D	L	GF	GA	GD	Pts	Qualification	CHE	CFC	FCG
1	Chennaiyin FC	2	2	0	0	5	1	+4	6	Final round	—	3–0	—
2	Corbett FC	2	1	0	1	1	3	−2	3	Final round	—	—	1–0
3	FC Goa	2	0	0	2	1	3	−2	0		1–2	—	—

Updated to match(es) played on 30 April 2024. Source: AIFF

=== Group 2 ===
Pos	Team	Pld	W	D	L	GF	GA	GD	Pts	Qualification	SNI	SHL	MCI
1	Snipers Football Club	2	2	0	0	7	3	+4	6	Final round	—	—	3–1
2	Shillong Lajong	2	1	0	1	4	5	−1	3	Final round	2–4	—	—
3	Mumbai City	2	0	0	2	2	5	−3	0		—	1–2	—

Updated to match(es) played on 30 April 2024. Source: AIFF

=== Group 3 ===
Pos	Team	Pld	W	D	L	GF	GA	GD	Pts	Qualification	CFA	RAJ	SRD
1	Classic Football Academy	2	2	0	0	3	0	+3	6	Final round	—	—	2–0
2	Rajasthan United	2	1	0	1	3	3	0	3	Final round	0–1	—	—
3	Sreenidi Deccan	2	0	0	2	2	5	−3	0		—	2–3	—

Updated to match(es) played on 30 April 2024. Source: AIFF

== Final round ==
=== Final Group A ===
All matches to be played at Tilak Maidan, Vasco da Gama.

Pos	Team	Pld	W	D	L	GF	GA	GD	Pts	Qualification	SUD	PUN	MBSG	RAJ
1	Sudeva Delhi FC	3	3	0	0	5	1	+4	9	Knockouts	—	1–0	—	—
2	Punjab FC	3	1	1	1	6	3	+3	4	Knockouts	—	—	2–2	4–0
3	Mohun Bagan SG	3	0	2	1	5	7	−2	2		0–2	—	—	—
4	Rajasthan United	3	0	1	2	4	9	−5	1		1–2	—	3–3	—

Updated to match(es) played on 30 April 2024. Source: AIFF

=== Final Group B ===
All matches to be played at Utorda Ground, Mormugoa.

Pos	Team	Pld	W	D	L	GF	GA	GD	Pts	Qualification	KER	CFC	RFYC	USC
1	Kerala Blasters FC	3	2	0	1	4	1	+3	6	Knockouts	—	—	3–0	—
2	Corbett FC	3	1	1	1	5	5	0	4	Knockouts	0–1	—	3–3	—
3	Reliance Foundation Young Champs	3	1	1	1	5	6	−1	4		—	—	—	0–2
4	United SC	3	1	0	2	2	4	−2	3		0–1	1–2	—	—

Updated to match(es) played on 30 April 2024. Source: AIFF

=== Final Group C ===
All matches to be played at Utorda Ground, Mormugoa.

Pos	Team	Pld	W	D	L	GF	GA	GD	Pts	Qualification	ZIN	F4C	SNI	BEN
1	Zinc Football Academy	3	3	0	0	10	1	+9	9	Knockouts	—	3–0	—	—
2	Football 4 Change Academy	3	2	0	1	5	4	+1	6	Knockouts	—	—	3–1	2–0
3	Snipers Football Club	3	1	0	2	4	7	−3	3		0–2	—	—	3–2
4	Bengaluru FC	3	0	0	3	3	10	−7	0		1–5	—	—	—

Updated to match(es) played on 30 April 2024. Source: AIFF

=== Final Group D ===
All matches to be played at Tilak Maidan, Vasco da Gama.

Pos	Team	Pld	W	D	L	GF	GA	GD	Pts	Qualification	CFA	CHE	SHL	DSC
1	Classic Football Academy	3	3	0	0	8	1	+7	9	Knockouts	—	3–1	—	1–0
2	Chennaiyin FC	3	2	0	1	11	7	+4	6	Knockouts	—	—	4–3	—
3	Shillong Lajong	3	1	0	2	5	9	−4	3		0–4	—	—	2–1
4	Dempo SC	3	0	0	3	2	9	−7	0		—	1–6	—	—

Updated to match(es) played on 30 April 2024. Source: AIFF

== Knockouts ==
=== Bracket ===
Quarterfinals
A1	Sudeva Delhi FC	3
D2	Chennayin FC	1
C1	Zinc Football Academy	1
B2	Corbett FC	2
B1	Kerala Blasters FC	0
C2	Football 4 Change Academy	2
D2	Classic Football Academy	1
A1	Punjab FC	0

Semifinals
A1	Sudeva Delhi FC	4
B2	Corbett FC	0
C2	Football 4 Change Academy	0
D1	Classic Football Academy	2

Finals
A1	Sudeva Delhi FC	1
D1	Classic Football Academy	2

=== Quarterfinals ===
21 May 2024
07:30 IST
QF1

Sudeva Delhi FC	3–1	Chennaiyin FC
Ginminhao 7'; Md Sami 46'; Bhanja 74' (pen.)	Report	Daniyal 9'

Tilak Maidan, Vasco, Goa
Attendance: 100
Referee: Ritesh Rajaram Parsekar

21 May 2024
16:00 IST
QF2

Zinc Football Academy	1–2	Corbett FC
Ashish 6'	Report	Animesh 62'; Rodu 90+2'

Tilak Maidan, Vasco, Goa
Attendance: 75
Referee: Nisar K

21 May 2024
07:30 IST
QF3

Kerala Blasters	0–2	Football 4 Change Academy
	Report	Seiboilal 41'; Janggunhao 77'

Utorda Ground, Mormugao, Goa
Attendance: 20
Referee: C Suman Kumar

21 May 2024
16:00 IST
QF4

Classic Football Academy	1–0	Punjab FC
Sumit 69'	Report

Utorda Ground, Mormugao, Goa
Attendance: 40
Referee: Diwakar Kumar

=== Semi-finals ===
23 May 2024
07:30 IST
SF1

Sudeva Delhi FC	4–0	Corbett FC
Md Sami 23' (pen.); Animesh 35' (o.g.); Bhanja 78'; Zidane 89'	Report

Nagoa Panchayat Ground, Nagoa, Goa
Attendance: 75
Referee: Tobias Mervin A

23 May 2024
16:00 IST
SF2

Football 4 Change Academy	0–2	Classic Football Academy
	Report	Bharat 17'; Yaipharemba 37'

Nagoa Panchayat Ground, Nagoa, Goa
Attendance: 80
Referee: Diwakar Kumar

=== Final ===
25 May 2024
16:00 IST
Final

Sudeva Delhi FC	1-2	Classic Football Academy
Gaurav 60'	Report	Samson 56'; Rishi Singh 49'

Nagoa Panchayat Ground, Nagoa, Goa
Attendance: 150
Referee: Ritesh Rajaram Parsekar

== Statistics ==
As of 28 December 2023

=== Top scorers ===
Rank	Player	Club	Goals
1	Md Mahmad Sami	Sudeva Delhi FC	16
1	Prem Hansdak	Zinc Football Academy	16
3	Omang Dodum	Punjab FC	12
3	Iashanbok Buhphang	Bhaichung Bhutia Football Schools	12
6	Sujin S	Kerala Blasters	11

== See also ==
- 2024 Reliance Foundation Development League
