= David Booth (football manager) =

English football player and manager (born 1948)

Personal information
- Date of birth: 2 October 1948 (age 78)
- Place of birth: Darton, England
- Position: Left back

Senior career*
Years	Team	Apps	(Gls)
1968–1972	Barnsley	164	(8)
1972–1978	Grimsby Town	200	(7)
Total		364	(15)

Managerial career
- 1982–1985: Grimsby Town
- 1987–1989: Darlington
- 1989: Peterborough United (caretaker)
- 1990–1991: Peterborough United
- 1991–1994: Ashanti Gold
- 1996–1999: Brunei
- 2000–2003: Myanmar
- 2003–2004: Mahindra United
- 2005: Khatoco Khánh Hòa
- 2006: BEC Tero Sasana
- 2007: Club Valencia
- 2007–2009: Mumbai
- 2009–2010: Mahindra United
- 2010: Laos
- 2011: Sisaket
- 2011–2012: Phnom Penh Crown
- 2012–2013: Salgaocar
- 2014–2015: Lao Toyota
- 2016: Khon Kaen United
- 2016: Lanexang United
- 2017–2019: Ozone
- * Club domestic league appearances and goals

David Booth (born 2 October 1948) is an English football manager and former player.

== Early years ==
Booth was brought up in Darton near Barnsley and attended Queen Elizabeth Grammar School, Wakefield where he played rugby and cricket. Football was not played at his school. Dave joined Barnsley and made his first team debut at 19 years of age at left back where he played most of his career. He was later signed by Laurie McMenemy, later of Southampton and the England coaching staff, who was then manager of Grimsby Town.

== Managerial career ==
David Booth became manager of Grimsby Town in January 1982 with the club at the bottom of the Second Division, following the dismissal of George Kerr. A late upturn in form enabled Grimsby to escape relegation, and good form continued into the 1982–83 season with Grimsby as high as 4th after two-thirds of the season. However, failure to win their last 14 games meant that Grimsby only narrowly avoided relegation.

The 1983–84 season, however, would see Grimsby emerge as serious promotion contenders for the majority of the season. They were third in the table at the end of February 1984, but a late dip in form meant they finished in fifth place and ten points off the top three, but it was and remains their highest finish in the league since relegation from the First Division in 1948. Good form continued the following season with a tenth-place finish, and deposing Everton from the League Cup, but Booth resigned in November 1985 to participate in a property developing venture abroad, and was replaced by Mick Lyons.

He later managed Darlington but could not prevent relegation from the Third Division. The initial challenge for promotion was not sustained and the side was facing relegation from the League when Booth was sacked in February 1989. Following this he became Assistant Manager and latterly Caretaker Manager at Peterborough United after the sacking of Mark Lawrenson. He was sacked after a brief spell and some poor performances with Chris Turner becoming manager who earned successive promotions to the second division.

In 1991, Booth moved to Ghana first coached at Obuasi Ashanti Gold and led them to the championship. He was recommended by Bobby Charlton when Charlton's company, BCI, worked as consultants for the Ashanti Goldfields Corporation who funded the football club. 'I had never been to Africa before I took a short-term contract at Obuasi and I treated it like an adventure,' said Booth. He signed up for four weeks and stayed for four years; moved on to Brunei, then moved back after Ghana after long time Asante Kotoko S.C. as a technical director.

He moved to India in 2003 to manage Mumbai-based club Mahindra United guiding them to win Federation Cup, Super Cup and the Mumbai Football League. But then there was an apparent falling out with Chairman Alan Durante, and he departed for South-East Asia.

In South East Asia, he was the coach of the Myanmar national football team in 2003 guiding them to the semi-finals of the 2003 SEA Games.

Upon returning to India with newly formed Mumbai FC to join his friends Henry Menezes and Arshad, he promoted the club from second division and ensured Mumbai FC as a mid-table I-League club. With the relative success of Booth, Menezes and Arshad, Mahindra United was quick to offer better contracts to the trio. with Booth signing a three-year deal with Mahindra United starting from August 2009.

After his brief successful spell in India, he was appointed coach of Laos national football team from July 2010 till December 2010. He also had a small stint in Sisaket F.C. of Thai Premier League. He then moved to Phnom Penh Crown FC in the Cambodian League from 2011 to 2012 winning Cambodian League, also becoming runner's up in 2011 AFC President's Cup. He again returned to India and had a one-year stint at Salgaocar F.C. between 2012 and 2013. After his unsuccessful return to India, he was again appointed as Laos national football team from August 2014.

On 1 November 2017, he was appointed as the head coach of I-League 2nd Division side Ozone. The club won 2017–18 Bangalore Super Division under his coaching.

== Honours ==
=== As a manager ===
Grimsby Town

- Football League Group Cup: 1981–82
- Lincolnshire Senior Cup: 1983–84

Ashanti Gold

- Ghana Premier League:1993–94

Mahindra United

- Federation Cup: 2003
- The Mumbai League: 2002–03

Mumbai

- 2008 I-League 2nd Division: 2007–08

Phnom Penh Crown

- Cambodian League: 2011
- 2011 AFC President's Cup runner-up: 2011

Lao Toyota

- Lao Premier League: 2015; runner-up 2014
- Lao FF Cup runner-up: 2014

Ozone

- Bangalore Super Division: 2017–18

== Managerial stats ==
Team	Nat	From	To	Record				
Team	Nat	From	To	G	W	L	D	Win %
Grimsby Town	(England)	January 1982	October 1985	177	64	63	50	36.2
Darlington	(England)	March 1987	February 1989	101	25	46	30	24.8
Mahindra United	(India)	2003	2004					
Mumbai FC	(India)	2007	2009	32	12	10	10	37.5
Mahindra United	(India)	2009	2010	10	4	0	6	40.0
Laos national football team	(Laos)	2010	2010	6	1	3	2	40.5
Sisaket	(Thailand)	2011	2011					
Phnom Penh Crown	(Cambodia)	2011	2012	36	22	8	6	
Salgaocar	(India)	2012	2013	10	2	2	6	20.0
Lao Toyota FC	(Laos)	2014	2015	17	12	3	3	
Laos national football team	(Laos)	2014	2015					
Khon Kaen United	(Thailand)	2016	2016	2	0	0	2	0
Lanexang United	(Laos)	2016	2016					
