= Bengaluru FC Reserves and Academy =

Reserves and youth teams of Bengaluru FC

Bengaluru FC B
- Full name: Bengaluru FC B
- Nickname: The Blue Colts
- Founded: October 12, 2017; 9 years ago
- Ground: Bangalore Football Stadium, Bengaluru
- Capacity: 8,400
- Owner: JSW Group
- Chairman: Sajjan Jindal
- Head coach: Bibiano Fernandes
- League: Karnataka Super Division; Reliance Foundation Development League; Youth League
- Website: www.bengalurufc.com
Home colours	Away colours	Third colours

Bengaluru FC Reserves and Academy, also known as Bengaluru FC B, is Bengaluru FC's most senior youth team, and also acting as a reserve team. It participates in Karnataka Super Division and Reliance Foundation Development League. Bengaluru FC Academy is the youth setup of Bengaluru FC. Its teams participate in Youth League, Junior League and Sub Junior League tournaments.

In July 2020, Asian Football Confederation conferred two-star Academy status to Bengaluru FC Academy, one of only two academies in India.

== Reserves ==
In October 2017, Bengaluru FC announced 28-member squad, which would act as a reserve side called Bengaluru FC 'B', led by Naushad Moosa and would compete in I-League 2nd Division for 2017–18 season. Reserve team would also act as a bridge between the BFC Academy and the first team. Reserves team made their first appearance in the annual G.V. Raja football tournament in Thiruvananthapuram.

The reserves team participated in 2017–18 BDFA Super Division and were placed fourth in the league, following the conclusion of the tournament, the team also participated in 2017–18 I-League 2nd Division and finished second in the group stage. Bengaluru FC 'B' won their first trophy under Naushad Moosa when they won 2018 Puttaiah Memorial Cup. The same season reserves team also won 2018–19 BDFA Super Division for the first time, and remained undefeated with 7 wins and 1 draw in 2018–19 I-League 2nd Division. In 2023–24 season of BDFA Super Division League, they emerged as unbeaten champion.

=== Squad ===
As of 3 August 2024

Note: Flags indicate national team as defined under FIFA eligibility rules; some limited exceptions apply. Players may hold more than one non-FIFA nationality.

No.	Pos.	Nation	Player
2	DF	IND	Johnson Singh Laishain
4	DF	IND	Lalhmunmawia
5	DF	IND	Likmabam Rakesh
6	MF	IND	Freddy Chawngthansanga
7	FW	IND	Lalthangliana
8	FW	IND	Advait Shinde
10	MF	IND	Emanuel Lalchhanchhuaha
11	FW	IND	Ronik Singh Moirangthem
12	FW	IND	Ngangom Guenendro
13	GK	IND	Raj Biswas
14	MF	IND	Damaitphang Lyngdoh
16	MF	IND	Biswa Kumar Darjee
18	DF	IND	Robin Yadav

No.	Pos.	Nation	Player
19	MF	IND	Amay Morajkar
20	MF	IND	Shighil NS
22	FW	IND	Akashdeep Singh
23	DF	IND	Namgyal Bhutia
29	FW	IND	Sridarth Nongmeikapam
30	GK	IND	Sahil Poonia
38	DF	IND	Mohammed Rafi
41	FW	IND	Monirul Molla
47	MF	IND	Rashid CK
53	DF	IND	Ashik Adhikari
55	MF	IND	Lalpekhlua Lalnuntluanga
57	MF	IND	Sai Yashwant Reddy Panthy

=== Results ===
Season	Tournament	Zone	Final result
2017–18	BDFA Super Division	—	4th
2017–18	2nd Division	Group C	Group stage – 2nd
2018–19	Puttaiah Memorial Cup	—	Winners
2018–19	BDFA Super Division	—	Winners
2018–19	2nd Division	Group A	Group stage – 1st
2019–20	BDFA Super Division	—	Winners
2019–20	2nd Division	Group B	League suspended
2020–21	BDFA Super Division	—	Runners-up
2021–22	BDFA Super Division	—	4th
2021–22	RF Development League	—	Winners
2021–22	Next Gen Cup	Midlands	4th
2022–23
2022–23	Puttaiah Memorial Cup	Group B	Semifinals
2022–23	BDFA Super Division	—	5th
2022–23	2023 Stafford Challenge Cup	Group C	Group stage – 4th
2022–23	I-League 2	Group C	Group stage – 3rd
2022–23	RF Development League	—	Winners
2022–23	Next Gen Cup	Group A	7th
2023–24
2023–24	Puttaiah Memorial Cup	—	Round of 16
2023–24	BDFA Super Division	—	Winners
2024-25
2024-25	Puttaiah Memorial Cup	—	Runners-up
2024-25	BDFA Super Division	—	5th

=== Coaching staff ===
Position	Name
Head coach	Vacant
Assistant coach	(India) Kaizad Ambapardiwalla
Physiotherapist	(India) Rahul CR
Video analyst	(India) Prateek Chopra
Goalkeeping Coach	(India) Parshuram Salwadi
S&C Coach	(India) Nishad Nagaraj
Kit Manager	(India) Krishna Khati
Kit Manager	(India) Ravi
U 15 coach	(Wales) Jason Brindley
Goalkeeper coach	(India) Rashid Nalakath
Coach U13	(India) Jeevan Jayaraj
S&C Coach	(India) Dhruv Balaram
Physiotherapist	(India) Girish Raj
Asst. Physiotherapist	(India) Roy

=== Coaches ===
- (India) Naushad Moosa (2017–2022)
- (Netherlands) Jan Van Loon (2022–2023)
- (India) Bibiano Fernandes (2023–2025)

== Academy ==
With the inception of Bengaluru FC in 2013, Bengaluru FC also started youth academy with the aim of "nurturing talent within the lower age groups with the possibility of creating players who are fit to represent the Blues’ first team." under Richard Hood as Head of Youth Development. Three years later in July 2016, Bengaluru FC started a residential academy at Vijaynagar, near Bellary under John Killa.

=== Under–18 ===
Bengaluru FC youth team first participated in 2014 I-League U19, in Rest of India zone along with Hindustan, Aizawl, and Garhwal, where they placed second in the group stage and could not advance. In 2014–15 I-League U19 season, they were placed last in the group stage of Rest of India zone. In 2015–16 I-League U18, they were placed third in the group stage. After the set up of residential academy, U18 team convincingly won their group in Rest of India zone in 2016–17 season defeating Ozone FC and Fateh Hyderabad, while remaining unbeaten. In final round the U18 team finished third in the group failed to advance to the semifinals.

==== Squad ====
As of 22 September 2019

Note: Flags indicate national team as defined under FIFA eligibility rules; some limited exceptions apply. Players may hold more than one non-FIFA nationality.

No.	Pos.	Nation	Player
1	GK	IND	Dipesh Chauhan
2	DF	IND	Johnson Singh Laishain
4	DF	IND	FC Lalhmunmawia
5	DF	IND	Likmabam Rakesh
6	MF	IND	Fredy Chawngthansanga
7	FW	IND	Lalthangliana
9	MF	IND	Bekey Oram
10	MF	IND	Emanuel Lalchhanchhuaha
11	FW	IND	Ronik Singh Moirangthem
12	FW	IND	Ngangom Gunendro
13	GK	IND	Raj Biswa

No.	Pos.	Nation	Player
14	MF	IND	Damaitphang Lyngdoh
17	DF	IND	Jagdeep Singh
18	MF	IND	Robin Yadav
20	MF	IND	Shighil NS
22	FW	IND	Akashdeep Singh
29	FW	IND	Sridarth Nongmeikapam
32	MF	IND	Vinith Venkatesh
33	DF	IND	Joshua Wilson
35	FW	IND	Macarton Louis Nickson
36	DF	IND	Sarath Rajkumar
38	DF	IND	Mohammed Rafi

=== Under–15 ===
Bengaluru FC participated in the first ever U15 Youth League tournament and were placed in Rest of India II zone with Ozone FC, Fateh Hyderabad, Boca Juniors FS, Kovalam FC, Mahogany FC. Bengaluru finished second behind Ozone to qualify for national finals. In final round Bengaluru U15 drawn into Group A along with United, Aizawl and Sporting Goa. Bengaluru U15 placed third in the group stage and failed to advance. In 2016–17 season Under–16 team, playing in Rest of India zone (Goa) also won the group stage, winning all three games against Dempo, Salgaocar and Sporting Goa, however they lost to eventual champions, Minerva Punjab in the semifinals.

In 2017–18 season Under–15 team, won the Karnataka zone to qualify for national finals. In final round the team was clubbed with MSP FA, SAI Guwahati and FC Goa. Bengaluru topped the group and entered the semifinals, where they lost in penalty shoot-out to DSK Shivajians.

=== Notable alumni ===
In November 2016, Calvin Abhishek became the first academy graduate to be selected for the senior team. In August 2017 Bengaluru FC added two academy graduates, defender Prashanth Kalinga and forward Leon Augustine, to the squad for 2017 AFC Cup knockout rounds.

Name	Position	Bengaluru Career	League Appearances	League Goals
Calvin Abhishek	Goalkeeper	2016–2018	0	0
Prashanth Kalinga	Defender	2015–2017	0	0
Leon Augustine	Forward	2017–present	14	2
Paikhomba Meitei Khumanthem	Midfielder	2021–present		
Lalpekhkua	Forward	2021–present		

=== Soccer schools ===
In April 2014, the academy also started the initiative of Soccer schools to conduct summer camps, provide training and scout young talents. Soccer schools are currently operated at 5 locations in various parts of Bengaluru.

=== Coaches ===
- Richard Hood (2013–2015)
- John Killa (2015–2018)
- John Kenneth Raj (2018–present)

=== Results ===
Season	Tournament	Zone	Final Result
2014	Under-19	Rest of India	Zonal Group stage
2014–15	Under-19	Rest of India	Zonal Group stage
2015–16	Under-15	Rest of India II (Bengaluru)	Group stage
2015–16	Under-18	Rest of India	Zonal Group stage
2016–17	Under-16	Rest of India (Goa)	Semi–finals
2016–17	Under-18	Rest of India	Group Stage
2017–18	Under-13	Karnataka	Disqualified
2017–18	Under-15	Karnataka	Semi–finals
2017–18	Under-18	Chennai–Karnataka	Final round
2018–19	Sub-Junior	Bengaluru Group B	Runners Up
2018–19	Junior	Bengaluru Group A	Runners Up
2018–19	Elite	Karnataka–Andhra	Final round
2019–20	Sub-Junior	Bengaluru Group A	Suspended due to COVID-19 pandemic in India
2019–20	Junior	Karnataka Group B	Suspended due to COVID-19 pandemic in India
2019–20	Elite	Chennai & Bengaluru	Suspended due to COVID-19 pandemic in India
2022–23	Elite	Group J	Group stage
2023–24	Elite	Group F	TBD

== Honours ==
- Reliance Foundation Development League
  - Champions (2): 2022, 2023
- BDFA Super Division
  - Champions (3): 2018–19, 2019–20, 2023–24
- Puttaiah Memorial Cup
  - Champions (1): 2019

== See also ==
- Bengaluru FC Futsal
