= 2018–19 BDFA Super Division =

BDFA Super Division
- Season: 2018–19
- Champions: Bengaluru FC 'B' (1st title)
- Relegated: Jawahar Union; CIL

The 2018–19 BDFA Super Division was the sixteenth season of the BDFA Super Division which is the third tier of the Indian association football system and the top tier of the Karnataka football system. The season started on 21 October 2018. Ozone F.C. were the defending champions. The league was contested by top 9 teams from 2017–18 season as well as ADE and Bangalore Eagles who were promoted from 2017–18 BDFA 'A' division. They replaced Jawahar Union and CIL who were relegated to 2019–20 BDFA 'A' Division. Kickstart FC, Bengaluru United and Bangalore Dream United were direct entry teams, thus bringing total number of teams to 14.

Bengaluru FC 'B' won their first title with a game to spare. At the end of the season, Jawahar Union and CIL were relegated to 'A' Division.

== Teams ==
Club
Army Service Corps (ASC)
ADE
Bangalore Dream United
Bangalore Eagles
Bangalore Independents
Bengaluru FC 'B'
Controllerate of Inspection Electronics (CIL)
Bengaluru United
Jawahar Union
Kickstart FC
Madras Engineer Group (MEG)
Ozone FC
South United
Students Union

== Table ==
Pos	Team	Pld	W	D	L	GF	GA	GD	Pts	Qualification or relegation
1	Bengaluru FC 'B' (C)	13	11	1	1	46	4	+42	34	Champions
2	Ozone	13	9	0	4	20	7	+13	27	
3	MEG	13	7	4	2	21	12	+9	25	
4	Kickstart FC	13	7	3	3	24	16	+8	24	
5	Bengaluru United	13	6	5	2	21	12	+9	23	
6	Army Service Corps	13	6	3	4	27	17	+10	21	
7	South United	13	6	3	4	22	13	+9	21	
8	Students Union	13	5	2	6	21	33	−12	17	
9	Bangalore Independents	13	4	3	6	16	21	−5	15	
10	Bangalore Eagles	13	4	2	7	12	22	−10	14	
11	ADE	13	4	1	8	15	22	−7	13	
12	Bangalore Dream United	13	3	2	8	17	21	−4	11	
13	Jawahar Union (R)	13	2	5	6	9	17	−8	11	Relegation to 2019–20 BDFA A Division
14	CIL (R)	13	0	0	13	4	58	−54	0	Relegation to 2019–20 BDFA A Division

Source: Garden City Soccer
Rules for classification: 1) points; 2) goal difference; 3) number of goals scored
(C) Champions; (R) Relegated
