= Poornima College of Engineering =

Engineering college in Jaipur, India

- Other name: PCE
- Type: Engineering college and research institution
- Established: 2000
- Parent institution: Poornima Group of Institutions (PGI)
- Affiliations: Shanti Education Society (SES)
- Academic affiliations: AICTE, Rajasthan Technical University, National Board of Accreditation (NBA)
- Chairman: Er. Parth Porwal
- Director: ER. Lalu porwal
- Faculty: 500
- Students: 5000
- Location: ISI-6, RIICO Institutional Area, Sitapura, Poornima Marg, Sitapura, Jaipur, Rajasthan 302022, India and 26.765574°N 75.8510681°E
- Campus: Urban
- Nickname: PCE
- Website: poornima.org

Poornima College of Engineering (PCE) is the main campus of Poornima Group of Colleges based in Jaipur, Rajasthan and established in 1999. It now has three institutions and has grown to 10,000 students.

== History ==
Poornima College of Engineering was founded in 1999 by the Shanti Education Society.

Poornima Group of Colleges comprises Poornima College of Engineering (established 2000), Poornima Institute of Engineering & Technology (established 2007), and Poornima Group of Institutions (established 2009). It is a member of the IBM Software Centre of Excellence. Rajasthan.

== Organisation and administration ==
=== Departments ===
- Computer Science and Engineering
- Electrical Engineering
- Electronics and Communication Engineering
- Mechanical Engineering
- Information Technology
- Civil Engineering
- Agriculture Engineering

=== Sister Colleges ===
- Poornima University
- Poornima Institute of Engineering and Technology
- Jodhpur Institute of Engineering and Technology

== Student life ==
=== Technical Clubs ===
==== Society of Automotive Engineers (SAE Club) ====
SAE Club provide many benefits to members like tangible contact with their future profession & various objectives on engineering education. SAE Club is a Chapter of Society of Automotive Engineers (SAE-INDIA), Northern Section established in 2018. Currently this collegiate club has more than 90 members from various departments.

==== Zircon Club ====
Zircon Club was established in year 2010 at Poornima College of Engineering. Every year zircon club organizes various technical events and workshops for all the engineering students. Zircon Club guides the student of 1st year of Poornima College of Engineering in making various projects. Members of zircon club have won various prizes by participating in technical event of many IITs, NITs and reputed colleges.

==== Udaan Aeromodelling Club ====
It is an Aeromodelling Club of Poornima Group of Colleges.

=== Formula Student Teams ===
==== Crusade Motorsports ====
Crusade Motorsports is a Formula Student team of PCE, Jaipur involved in designing, manufacturing and racing a Formula prototype racecar. This Formula Student team participates in national level student competition Supra SAEINDIA organized by SAE International.

==== Team Hayagriva ====
Hayagriva is a student organization. 30+ students with a formal 3-tier team structure spread across various disciplines design, engineer and race their vehicles at various competitions. The team has always operated independently, transferring the knowledge obtained from year to year. Team Hayagriva participates in Formula Imperial competition organized by ISIE.

== See also ==
- List of universities in India
- Universities and colleges in India
- Education in India
- University Grants Commission (India)
