= 2010 I-League U19 =

- Champions: Sporting Clube de Goa (1st title)

The 2010 I-League U19 was the second edition of the I-League U19.

The tournament was held in May 2010 in Phagwara, Kolkata and Goa with the I-League and I-League 2nd Division youth teams and academies.

All teams played the other teams in their group once and the group winners (3 group winners) and second placed (3 second placed) played in two qualification groups. The winners qualifies for the final. The Sporting Clube de Goa won the edition of the youth league.

== Group stage ==
The 14 participating teams were divided into three groups and played against each other. The group winner and the second placed made it to the next round. Group A was held in Goa, while Group B in Paghwara and Group C in Kolkata.

=== Group A ===
- Mahindra United
- Air India
- Mumbai FC
- Pune FC
- JCT

=== Group B ===
- Dempo
- Sporting Clube de Goa
- Viva Kerala
- Churchill Brothers
- Salgaocar

=== Group C ===
- Mohun Bagan
- East Bengal
- United SC
- Shillong Lajong

== Final round ==
=== Champions Group Stage ===
The group winners qualified for the final.

| Team | Pld | W | D | L | GF | GA | GD | Pts |
|---|---|---|---|---|---|---|---|---|
| Sporting Clube de Goa | 2 | 1 | 1 | 0 | 5 | 3 | +2 | 4 |
| Mohun Bagan | 2 | 1 | 1 | 0 | 3 | 1 | +2 | 4 |
| JCT | 2 | 0 | 0 | 2 | 2 | 6 | -4 | 0 |

| Team | Pld | W | D | L | GF | GA | GD | Pts |
|---|---|---|---|---|---|---|---|---|
| East Bengal | 2 | 1 | 0 | 1 | 5 | 4 | +1 | 3 |
| Pune FC | 2 | 1 | 0 | 1 | 3 | 2 | +1 | 3 |
| Dempo | 2 | 1 | 0 | 1 | 4 | 6 | -2 | 3 |

=== Finals ===
31 May 2010

| SC Goa | 4–2 | East Bengal |

East Bengal Ground
