= 2022 Reliance Foundation Development League =

First season of RFDL

Reliance Foundation Development League
- Season: 2022
- Dates: 15 April – 12 May 2022
- Champions: Bengaluru FC (1st title)
- Runner up: Kerala Blasters
- Matches: 28
- Top goalscorer: Rahul Raju (Bengaluru); 7 goals
- Highest scoring: Bengaluru 5–2 Jamshedpur
- Longest winning run: Bengaluru (6 wins)
- Longest unbeaten run: Bengaluru (7 games)
- Longest winless run: Mumbai City (7 games)
- Longest losing run: Mumbai City (7 games)

The 2022 Reliance Foundation Development League was the inaugural season of the Reliance Foundation Development League, the first developmental association football league organised by Reliance Foundation in technical support with AIFF. The season featured eight teams, each playing 7 matches during the season, which was held in Goa from 15 April to 12 May 2022. Bengaluru FC Reserves and Kerala Blasters Reserves were the champions and runners up of the season respectively with both the teams qualifying for the Next Gen Cup to be held in United Kingdom.

== Background ==
In June 2021 it was proposed by the organisers of ISL after a meeting with the CEOs of all the ISL clubs, that a new developmental league, called Reliance Foundation Development League, would be introduced in 2022. This new league would consist of the youth and reserve teams of all the ISL clubs, with aim to develop young players as there has been limited number of competitions and leagues outside the ISL since the pandemic.

The inaugural season of the proposed two-month league will be held in Goa inside a bio-secure bubble between January and March, following the same medical and safety procedures for 2021–22 ISL season, but got postponed to April 15. The league was confirmed on 7 April 2022.

== Format ==
The teams would predominantly feature U-21 players with few overage players allowed as well. Each team will play seven matches again each other on a single round basis. A total of 28 matches will be played.

=== Qualification ===
The top-two teams will play in the 2022 Next Gen Cup. Bengaluru FC and Kerala Blasters FC confirmed their top-two finish and qualified for the NextGen Cup.

== League table ==
Pos	Team	Pld	W	D	L	GF	GA	GD	Pts	Qualification
1	Bengaluru (C)	7	6	1	0	19	4	+15	19	Advance to Next Gen Cup
2	Kerala Blasters	7	6	1	0	11	3	+8	19	Advance to Next Gen Cup
3	Hyderabad	7	4	1	2	14	9	+5	13	
4	Goa	7	4	1	2	11	10	+1	13	
5	Young Champs	7	2	1	4	4	10	−6	7	
6	Jamshedpur	7	2	1	4	12	12	0	7	
7	Chennaiyin	7	1	2	4	7	12	−5	5	
8	Mumbai City	7	0	0	7	2	20	−18	0	

Rules for classification: 1) points; 2) head-to-head points; 3) head-to-head goal difference; 4) goal difference; 5) number of goals scored; 6) play-off match
(C) Champions

=== Matches ===
==== Matchday – 1 ====
15 April 2022 1	Chennaiyin	0–1	Goa	Nagoa, Goa
08.00 IST	Pasha (yellow card) 62'	Report	B. Fernandes (yellow card) 43'; Dias 72'; Tiwari (yellow card) 88'	Stadium: Nagoa Panchayat Ground; Man of the Match: Jovial Dias (Goa)

15 April 2022 2	Bengaluru	2–0	RFYC	Benaulim, Goa
16.30 IST	T. Singh (yellow card) 14'; Oram 24'; Raju 90+3'	Report		Stadium: Benaulim Ground; Man of the Match: Robin Yadav (Bengaluru)

16 April 2022 3	Kerala Blasters	2–0	Hyderabad	Nagoa, Goa
08.00 IST	Barretto 17'; Das (yellow card) 27'; Singson 36' (o.g.); Salari (yellow card) 90+5'	Report	Rafi (yellow card) 25'	Stadium: Nagoa Panchayat Ground; Man of the Match: Ayush Adhikari (Kerala Blasters)

16 April 2022 4	Mumbai City	0–3	Jamshedpur	Benaulim, Goa
16.30 IST	D'Souza (yellow card) 37'	Report	Thakuri 26', 89'; Meitei 65'	Stadium: Benaulim Ground; Man of the Match: Lalruatmawia (Jamshedpur)

==== Matchday – 2 ====
19 April 2022 5	Bengaluru	2–1	Goa	Nagoa, Goa
08.00 IST	Oram 11'; Sharon (yellow card) 66'; Raju 87'	Report	Fernandes 17' (yellow card) 83'	Stadium: Nagoa Panchayat Ground; Man of the Match: Bekey Oram (Jamshedpur)

19 April 2022 6	Chennaiyin	2–2	Jamshedpur	Benaulim, Goa
16.30 IST	Solaimalai (yellow card) 10'; Lalvenhima 51'; Mathews (yellow card) 80'; Pasha 88'	Report	Meitei 45'; Yadav (yellow card) 87'; Lalruatmawia 90+5'	Stadium: Benaulim Ground; Man of the Match: Syed Suhail Pasha (Chennaiyin)

20 April 2022 7	Kerala Blasters	1–0	Mumbai City	Nagoa, Goa
08.00 IST	Adhikari 5'; Sudeesh (yellow card) 79'	Report	Vanveru (yellow card) 61'; Fernandes (yellow card) 70'	Stadium: Nagoa Panchayat Ground; Man of the Match: Shreyas Vatekar (Mumbai City)

20 April 2022 8	Hyderabad	2–1	RFYC	Benaulim, Goa
16.30 IST	Singh 62' (o.g.); Bordoloi 64'; Jongte (yellow card) 80'; Chhetry (yellow card) 90+2'	Report	Mistry 32'; Sarkar (yellow card) 61'; Rashid (yellow card) 90+3'	Stadium: Benaulim Ground; Man of the Match: Mark Zothanpuia (Hyderabad)

==== Matchday – 3 ====
23 April 2022 9	Chennaiyin	0–1	Kerala Blasters	Nagoa, Goa
08.00 IST	Nawab (yellow card) 8'; Tony A (yellow card) 72'	Report	Adhikari (yellow card) 14'; Barretto 86'	Stadium: Nagoa Panchayat Ground; Man of the Match: Devansh Dabas (Chennayin)

23 April 2022 10	Mumbai City	0–2	RFYC	Benaulim, Goa
16.30 IST	Ruivah (yellow card) 82'	Report	Himbahadur 7'; Rashid 45'; Nazareth (yellow card) 62'; Fernandes (yellow card) 71'	Stadium: Benaulim Ground; Man of the Match: Sanan Mohammed K (RFYC)

24 April 2022 11	Goa	1–5	Jamshedpur	Nagoa, Goa
08.00 IST	Tiwari (yellow card) 5'; Kalegar 14'	Report	Singh 6', 90+4'; Ali 11' (yellow card) 28'; Lalruatmawia 40'; Meitei 78'	Stadium: Nagoa Panchayat Ground; Man of the Match: Phijam Vikash Singh (Jamshedpur)

24 April 2022 12	Bengaluru	2–1	Hyderabad	Benaulim, Goa
16.30 IST	Raju 14' (yellow card) 90+3'; Yadav (yellow card) 65'; Bhutia (yellow card) 87'; Molla 90+2' (yellow card) 90+2'	Report	Zothanpuia (yellow card) 19'; Singh 46'; Singson (yellow card) 53'; Bordoloi (yellow card) 72'	Stadium: Benaulim Ground; Man of the Match: Sharon Padattil (Bengaluru)

==== Matchday – 4 ====
27 April 2022 13	Chennaiyin	0–0	RFYC	Nagoa, Goa
08.00 IST		Report		Stadium: Nagoa Panchayat Ground; Man of the Match: Solaimalai R (Chennayin)

27 April 2022 14	Kerala Blasters	2–0	Jamshedpur	Benaulim, Goa
16.30 IST	Barretto (yellow card) 11'; Sudeesh 27', 84'	Report	Tamang (yellow card) 38'	Stadium: Benaulim Ground; Man of the Match: Nihal Sudeesh (Kerala Blasters)

28 April 2022 15	Bengaluru	5–0	Mumbai City	Nagoa, Goa
08.00 IST	Mawphniang 5'; Raju 17', 45+1'; Virwani 79' (o.g.); Yadav 87'	Report	D'Souza (yellow card) 69'	Stadium: Nagoa Panchayat Ground; Man of the Match: Rahul Raju (Bengaluru)

28 April 2022 16	Goa	2–2	Hyderabad	Benaulim, Goa
16.30 IST	Rebello 21'; Menezes (yellow card) 70'; Fernandes (yellow card) 90+4'; Inamdar 90+4'	Report	Vanlalhriatpuia (yellow card) 40'; C Lalchungnunga 89'; Dutta 90+6'	Stadium: Benaulim Ground; Man of the Match: C Lalchungnunga (Hyderabad)

==== Matchday – 5 ====
3 May 2022 17	Jamshedpur	1–0	RFYC	Benaulim, Goa
8.00 IST		Report	Rashid 16'	Stadium: Benaulim Ground

3 May 2022 18	Bengaluru	3–0	Chennaiyin	Nagoa, Goa
16.30 IST	Mawphniang 25', 69'; Oram 68'; Bhutia (yellow card) 90+1'	Report		Stadium: Nagoa Panchayat Ground; Man of the Match: Bekey Oram (Bengaluru)

4 May 2022 19	Mumbai	0–5	Hyderabad	Nagoa, Goa
08.00 IST	Kaif (yellow card) 13'; Virwani (yellow card) 35'; Pinto (yellow card) 35'	Report	Sunny 12'; Dutta 14'; Pa 19'; Vanlalhriatpuia 88'; Bordoli 90'	Stadium: Nagoa Panchayat Ground; Man of the Match: Abhijith Pa (Hyderabad)

4 May 2022 20	Goa	3–1	Kerala Blasters	Benaulim, Goa
16.30 IST	Dias 42', 85'; Fernandes (yellow card) 70'; Inamdar (yellow card) 78'; B. Fernandes 89'; Rebello (yellow card) 90+2'	Report	Adhikari (yellow card) 11'; Sudeesh 20'; Varghese (yellow card) 42'; Barretto (yellow card) 90+2'	Stadium: Benaulim Ground; Man of the Match: Jovial Dias (Goa)

==== Matchday – 6 ====
7 May 2022 21	Bengaluru	5–2	Jamshedpur	Benaulim, Goa
8.00 IST	Raju 17', 52'; Mawphniang 25', 69'; Oram 47'; Jagdeep 60'	Report	L. Singh 4'; Barla 70'; Meitei (yellow card) 73'; Mukhi (yellow card) 90+1'	Stadium: Benaulim Ground; Man of the Match: Rahul Raju (Bengaluru)

7 May 2022 22	Chennaiyin	2–3	Hyderabad	Nagoa, Goa
16.30 IST	Mathews 29'; Solaimalai 57'	Report	Pa 21'; Lalchungnunga 39'; Ahmed (yellow card) 54'; Rafi 85'; Zothanpuia (yellow card) 89'	Stadium: Nagoa Panchayat Ground; Man of the Match: Mohmmad Rafi (Hyderabad)

8 May 2022 23	Goa	1–0	Mumbai City	Nagoa, Goa
08.00 IST	B. Fernandes (yellow card) 45+2' (goal) 64'; V. Fernandes (yellow card) 45+2'	Report		Stadium: Nagoa Panchayat Ground; Man of the Match: Brison Deuben Fernandes (Goa)

8 May 2022 24	Kerala Blasters	4–0	RFYC	Benaulim, Goa
16.30 IST	Basith 42'; Sudeesh 47'; Barretto 76'; Azhar (yellow card) 79'; Sreekuttan 90+5'	Report		Stadium: Benaulim Ground; Man of the Match: Mohammed Azhar (Kerala Blasters)

==== Matchday – 7 ====
11 May 2022 25	Goa	2–0	RFYC	Benaulim, Goa
8.00 IST	Lemruata (yellow card) 64'; Nazareth 25', 69'; Menzes 77'; Dias 88'	Report	Nazareth (yellow card) 65'; Mistry 80'	Stadium: Benaulim Ground; Man of the Match: Ryan Roger Menzes (Goa)

11 May 2022 26	Chennaiyin	3–2	Mumbai City	Nagoa, Goa
16.30 IST	Shaikh 19'; Lalvenhima 24', 58'; Mitra (yellow card) 74'; Nawab (yellow card) 90+5'	Report	Asif 21', 80' (yellow card) 31'	Stadium: Nagoa Panchayat Ground; Man of the Match: Joseph Lalvenhima (Chennaiyin)

12 May 2022 27	Jamshedpur	0-1	Hyderabad	Nagoa, Goa
08.00 IST	Beyong (yellow card) 53'; Rishi (yellow card) 90'	Report	Rabeeh 90+1'; A. Singh (yellow card) 90+2'	Stadium: Nagoa Panchayat Ground; Man of the Match: Abdul Rabeeh A.K. (Jamshedpur)

12 May 2022 28	Bengaluru	0–0	Kerala Blasters	Benaulim, Goa
16.30 IST	Vanlalhruaitluanga	Report	Sudeesh (yellow card) 22'; Krishna (yellow card) 83'; Barretto 76'; Varghese (yellow card) 90+8'	Stadium: Benaulim Ground; Man of the Match: Amay Morajkar (Bengaluru)

== See also ==
- Elite League
