= FC Deccan =

Indian association football club based in Bangalore

Deccan
- Full name: Football Club Deccan
- Nickname: The Greyellows
- Founded: 30 September 2017; 9 years ago
- Ground: Bangalore Football Stadium
- Capacity: 8,400
- Head coach: Haris Edathirinji
- League: Karnataka Super Division
Home colours	Away colours	Third colours

Football Club Deccan is an Indian professional football club based out of Bangalore, Karnataka. The team participates in the Karnataka Super Division, the fifth tier of the Indian football league system (first in the state of Karnataka).

== History ==
FC Deccan was founded on 30 September 2017 in Bangalore with a vision of promoting professional football among youngsters in the entire Deccan Plateau region. Hundreds of talented footballers aspiring to play in the top tier of the Bangalore District Football Association (BDFA) have got another avenue with the unveiling of new city-based club FC Deccan. FC Deccan has overseas partners in Germany who are bringing in technical expertise and European style of football to India. The club made headlines in November 2017 when it was announced that the side had completed the signings of former I-League midfielder Raju D. of Churchill Brothers and former Premier Futsal player Jonathan Piers of Bangalore franchise Bengaluru Royals.

FC Deccan played their first season in 2017–18 BDFA Super Division. They ended the season at the bottom of the table and were relegated to 'A' division.

In July 2018, FC Deccan started its "Academy" and "Soccer School" in Bangalore supported by Faimo Sports GmbH, Germany which is headed by Martin Monnerjahn. The program aims to build local talent from U-6 to U-18 who aspire to become professional players.

FC Deccan finished in third position in 'A' Division with 17 points (5W-2D-2L)for the season 2018–19.

FC Deccan finished first and won the championship of 'A' Division with 22 points (7W-1D-1L) for the season 2019–20, along with Young Challengers FC who finished in second place with 22 points but former had better goal difference. Both teams are promoted to Super Division for the season 2020–21.

== Colours and crest ==
The bull or "Nandi" in local language – on the crest defines strength and courage, the colour yellow signifies radiant nature of the club, with colour grey signifying maturity and responsibility.
