= National Football League (under-19) =

- Founded: 2001
- Folded: 2005
- Country: India
- Confederation: AFC
- Most championships: East Bengal (2 titles)

The National Football League (under-19) (NFL under-19) was an annual played a youth league competition featuring football clubs from India. Founded in 2001 through the All India Football Federation (AIFF), the NFL was the first youth football league in India to be organized on a national scale. The U19 teams of the National Football League teams took part in the competition. The I-League U19 was founded in 2008 as new youth league.

== Champions ==
Season	Champions	Runners-up	Results	Teams
2001–02	East Bengal	India U16	3–2	8
2002–03	East Bengal (2)	JCT Football Academy	1–0	9
2004–05	Mohun Bagan	East Bengal	0–0 (3–1 p)	12

== See also ==
- AIFF
- I-League
- I-League 2nd Division
- Indian Super League
