= 2023–24 BDFA Super Division =

BDFA Super Division
- Season: 2023–24
- Dates: 15 August 2023 — 22 November 2023
- Champions: Bengaluru FC 'B' (3rd title)
- Promoted: HAL SC
- Relegated: FC Deccan; Bangalore Dream United; Young Challengers
- Matches played: 171
- Goals scored: 596 (3.49 per match)
- Top goalscorer: Shlok Tiwari (Kodagu FC) (19 goals)
- All statistics correct as of 7 October 2024.

The 2023–24 BDFA Super Division was the 21st season of the BDFA Super Division, the fifth-tier league in the Indian football system, and Karnataka's top-tier football league. Bengaluru FC 'B' were crowned champions on 17 November 2023. They won the title without losing a game, and this was their third title.

== Changes from last season ==
=== Relegated to A Division ===
- Bangalore Eagles
- ADE

=== Promoted from A Division ===
- South United
- HAL

=== Direct entrants ===
- Real Chikkamagaluru

== Regular season ==
=== League table ===
| Pos | Team | Pld | W | D | L | GF | GA | GD | Pts | Qualification or relegation |
|---|---|---|---|---|---|---|---|---|---|---|
| 1 | Bengaluru B (Note: Bengaluru FC B being a reserve side are ineligible for promotion and will instead participate in the RFDL.) (C) | 18 | 16 | 2 | 0 | 57 | 9 | +48 | 50 | Champions |
| 2 | SC Bengaluru (Note: SC Bengaluru have qualified for the 2023–24 I-League 2 via finishing in the top three of 2023–24 I-League 3 play-offs round.) | 18 | 16 | 0 | 2 | 61 | 7 | +54 | 48 | |
| 3 | Bengaluru United (Note: FC Bengaluru United are in the 2023–24 I-League 2, the third tier of Indian football league system.) | 18 | 14 | 3 | 1 | 51 | 16 | +35 | 45 | |
| 4 | HAL SC | 18 | 10 | 3 | 5 | 31 | 19 | +12 | 33 | Eligible for 2024-25 I-League 3 |
| 5 | Roots | 18 | 10 | 2 | 6 | 30 | 19 | +11 | 32 | |
| 6 | South United | 18 | 9 | 4 | 5 | 38 | 23 | +15 | 31 | |
| 7 | Kodagu | 18 | 8 | 6 | 4 | 37 | 22 | +15 | 30 | |
| 8 | MEG | 18 | 8 | 6 | 4 | 33 | 22 | +11 | 30 | |
| 9 | Kickstart | 18 | 9 | 2 | 7 | 36 | 27 | +9 | 29 | |
| 10 | Agniputhra | 18 | 9 | 2 | 7 | 39 | 42 | −3 | 29 | |
| 11 | Students Union | 18 | 7 | 4 | 7 | 38 | 31 | +7 | 25 | |
| 12 | Bangalore Independents | 18 | 7 | 3 | 8 | 27 | 28 | −1 | 24 | |
| 13 | ASC | 18 | 6 | 2 | 10 | 32 | 38 | −6 | 20 | |
| 14 | Bangalore United FC | 18 | 5 | 2 | 11 | 25 | 43 | −18 | 17 | |
| 15 | Real Chikkamagaluru | 18 | 1 | 4 | 13 | 26 | 38 | −12 | 7 | |
| 16 | Rebels | 18 | 4 | 2 | 12 | 20 | 46 | −26 | 14 | |
| 17 | Deccan (R) | 18 | 3 | 5 | 10 | 15 | 36 | −21 | 14 | Relegation to 2024-25 BDFA A Division |
| 18 | Bangalore Dream United (R) | 18 | 2 | 1 | 15 | 7 | 69 | −62 | 7 | Relegation to 2024-25 BDFA A Division |
| 19 | Young Challengers (R) | 18 | 0 | 1 | 17 | 13 | 81 | −68 | 1 | Relegation to 2024-25 BDFA A Division |

Source: BDFA Instagram
Rules for classification: 1) points; 2) goal difference; 3) number of goals scored
(C) Champions; (R) Relegated

== Statistics ==
=== Top scorers ===
| No. | Player | Club | Goals |
|---|---|---|---|
| 1 | Shlok Tiwari | Kodagu FC | 19 |
| 2 | Pratik Swami | Students Union | 17 |
| 3 | Shaik Muzeeb | MEG | 15 |
| 4 | Arif Shaikh | SC Bengaluru | 14 |
| 5 | Nikhil Raj | FC Agniputhra | 10 |
| 5 | Lalnunzama | FC Agniputhra | 10 |
| 5 | Chesterpoul Lyngdoh | FC Bengaluru United | 10 |
| 6 | Jaison Jordan Vaz | FC Bengaluru United | 7 |

== Awards ==
- Fairplay: HAL SC

== See also ==
- 2023–24 Indian State Leagues
