= Manchester United Premier Cup =

- Founded: 1993
- Region: Worldwide
- Current champions: (Ghana) Right to Dream Academy (1st title)
- Most championships: (Spain) Barcelona (3 titles)

The Manchester United Premier Cup is a global youth football tournament that was established by Nike in 1993.

== History ==
The tournament was established by Nike in 1993 as the Nike Premier Cup and featured 624 teams from 15 European countries. The following year, the tournament expanded into the Asian continent, increasing the number of teams to 1,067, before adding a further 284 teams from the Latin American region in 1995 to reach 1,351 competing clubs. Chile hosted the first South American tournament that year as Universidad de Chile were crowned the first Latin American champions of the competition.

In 1996, the tournament was reorganised to include a World Finals stage following the regional tournaments. The regional tournaments served to whittle down the competing teams from over 2,500 to just 12 for the finals tournament held in Cape Town, South Africa in 1997. This structure was followed from 1996 to 2001, when it was decided that the host team and the national champions from 13 countries would be given direct qualification to the finals tournament, with the remaining six places in the 20-team tournament given to the teams from the Europe, Middle East, Latin America, South East Asia and Africa regions. In 1998, Athletic Bilbao won the tournament final in Paris and the winning players were rewarded with seats in the Stade de France for the final of the World Cup as hosts France defeated Brazil 3−0.

In 2003, to coincide with Nike replacing Umbro as kit sponsors of Manchester United, the tournament was re-branded as the Manchester United Premier Cup. The following year, Manchester City became the first English champions of the youth tournament, defeating hosts and city rivals Manchester United through a goal from Daniel Sturridge.

Dinamo Zagreb became the first Croatian and Eastern European side to win the tournament, defeating Milan 2−1 at Old Trafford on 9 August 2013. The following year, Dynamo Moscow became the first Russian club to win the tournament, beating Valencia 1−0 in the final on 9 August 2014. The tournament has continued to grow since its formation as a regional tournament in 1993 and, in 2014, over 8,000 teams and 1 million players competed in Premier Cup tournaments from 43 countries to gain one of 20 places available at the Premier Cup World Finals in Manchester.

== Premier Cup World Champions ==
Season	Winners	Host country	Venue city
1993–94	(Portugal) Porto (European)		
1994–95	(Spain) Real Madrid (European); Malaysia (Asia-Pacific)		
1995–96	(Spain) Espanyol (European) (Malaysia) Bukit Jalil Academy (Asia-Pacific); Universidad de Chile (Latin America)		
1996–97	(Argentina) Platense	South Africa	Cape Town
1997–98	(Spain) Athletic Bilbao	France	Paris
1998–99	(Spain) Barcelona	Spain	Barcelona
1999–2000	(Brazil) Internacional	Netherlands	Amsterdam
2000–01	(Brazil) Vitória	Germany	Berlin
2001–02	(Brazil) São Paulo	Portugal	Lisbon
2002–03	(Brazil) Corinthians	United States	Portland, Oregon
2003–04	(England) Manchester City	England	Manchester
2004–05	(Brazil) Fluminense	Hong Kong	Hong Kong
2005–06	(Mexico) Guadalajara	England	Manchester
2006–07	(Spain) Barcelona	England	Manchester
2007–08	(Brazil) Fluminense	England	Manchester
2008–09	(Brazil) São Paulo	England	Manchester
2009–10	(Spain) Barcelona	England	Manchester
2010–11	(Mexico) Pachuca	England	Manchester
2011–12	(Chile) Universidad Católica	China	Shanghai
2012–13	(Croatia) Dinamo Zagreb	England	Manchester
2013–14	(Russia) Dynamo Moscow	England	Manchester
2014–15	(Ghana) Right to Dream Academy	England	Manchester
