= Poornima University =

Private university in Rajasthan, India

- Other name: PU
- Motto: Your Dreams Our Goal
- Type: Private
- Established: 1 August 2012; 14 years ago
- Parent institution: Poornima Group of Institutions (PGI)
- Affiliations: UGC, COA, NCHMCT, AICTE
- Academic affiliations: Shanti Education Society (SES)
- Chairperson: Ar. Shashikant Singhi
- President: Dr. Suresh Chandra Padhy
- Director: Ar. Rahul Singhi
- Location: IS-2027-2031, Ramchandrapura, P.O. Vidhani Vatika, Sitapura Extension, Jaipur, Rajasthan, 303905, India; 26.7796°N 75.8771°E
- Campus: 32 acres (13 ha); Urban
- Colors: Sky blue, White
- Website: poornima.edu.in

Poornima University, established in 2012, is a private university in Jaipur, Rajasthan. The university was established by Rajasthan State Legislature vide Act No. 16/2012 and is recognized under section 22(1) of the University Grants Commission (India) Act, 1956.

== Affiliations and approval ==
Poornima University is approved by the Council of Architecture and the University of Grant Commission. The Indian Institute of Architects, Young Indians and Confederation of Indian Industry are its industrial partners.

== Faculty and institutes ==
=== Departments ===
- Faculty of Engineering and Technology
- Faculty of Computer Science & Engineering
- Faculty of Planning & Architecture
- Faculty of Design & Arts
- Faculty of Management & Commerce
- Faculty of Science & Humanities
- Faculty of Public Health
- Poornima Institute of Hotel Management
- Advanced Studies & Research Centre

=== Sister Colleges ===
- Poornima College of Engineering
- Poornima Institute of Engineering and Technology
- Jodhpur Institute of Engineering and Technology

== Campus and facilities ==
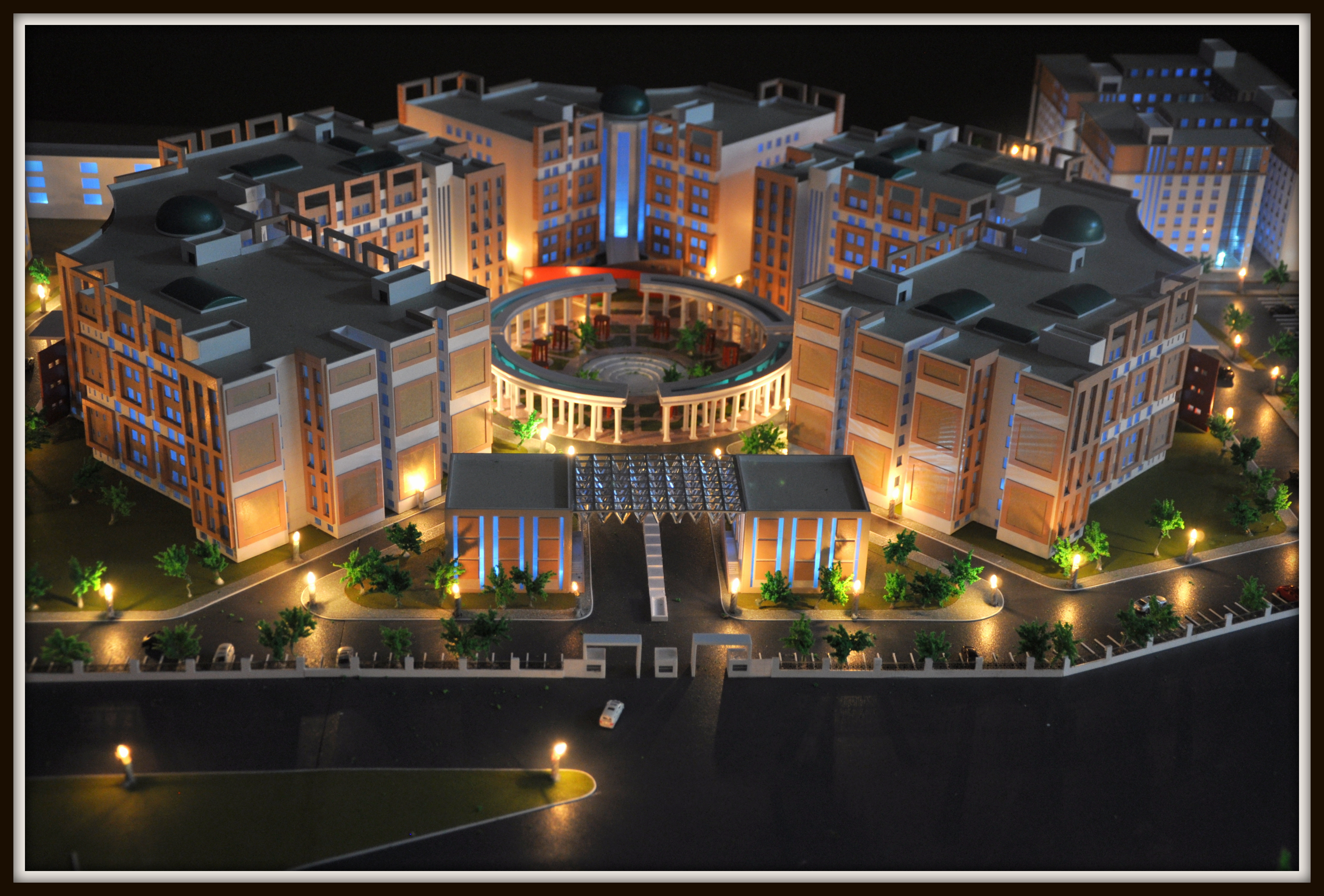
Poornima University Model in 2012

=== Research and Development ===
The university has a research and development lab, which allows students to publish their research papers in different national and international conferences like IEEE, CCWC, etc.

=== Extracurricular ===
Annual fest (named Lakshya), cultural fest, sports festivals, football leagues, etc. are held every year at university level.

Apart from these, a three-day project exhibition (named Prayogam) is held every year at the university.

PU also organized NASA-2019 convention.

=== Social Work ===
Poornima University runs a social welfare program that offer computer literacy education and basic education to underprivileged kids in society. Poornima Pathshala (nonprofit owned by PU) is also run by Nobel Prize winner Kailash Satyarthi on the university campus.

=== Other Facilities ===
The university has cricket, football, tennis, handball and basketball grounds. There is a small metrological observatory to observe geographical and climatological phenomena which is open to all students.

Other than that, 32 acres of land is dedicated to the sewerage treatment plant and the university also has a 100 KW solar plant.

== Partnerships ==
=== I-League club (Football) ===
I-League club from Rajasthan and Rajasthan United FC launched a residential football academy in Bhilwara (in 2021) collaborating with Poornima University.

=== Rajasthan Royals (IPL 2024) ===
In February 2024, Rajasthan Royals (for IPL 2024) announced Poornima University as their official University Partner. University's logo was displayed on cap and helmet of Rajasthan Royals's players.

== See also ==
- List of institutions of higher education in Rajasthan
