= Nagoa (Bardez) =

Coordinates: 15.555°N 73.780°E

Nagoa is a village in the Bardez sub-district of Goa, and lies between the North Goa headquarters town of Mapusa and the tourist-destination and former fishing village of Calangute. It is not to be mixed-up with a village of the same name which lies in the South Goa sub-district of Salcete.

== Area, population ==
According to the official 2011 Census, Nagoa has an area of 154.57 hectares, a total of 351 households, a population of 1,455 (comprising 732 males and 723 females) with an under-six years population of 124 (comprising 64 boys and 60 girls).

== Location ==
The village of Nagoa lies close to Arpora, Saligao and Parra villages of Bardez.

== Tourism destination ==
In recent times, Nagoa in Bardez has become home to many starred tourism. It lies close to Arpora, a region once known for its traditional salt-pans, at times when Goa's salt production was famous and exported far and wide.

== Recent issues ==
The spurt of tourism in the area has also brought in issues like narcotic drugs.

There have been issues of illegal road construction.
