= Bibiano Fernandes (footballer) =

Indian football manager (born 1976)

- Fernandes in 2022

Personal information
- Date of birth: 2 December 1976 (age 49)
- Place of birth: Mapusa, Goa, India
- Height: 1.85 m (6 ft 1 in)
- Position: Midfielder

Team information
- Current team: India U17 (head coach)

Senior career*
Years	Team	Apps	(Gls)
1997–1998	Churchill Brothers	34	(8)
1998–1999	Dempo	32	(10)
1999–2001	Vasco	56	(18)
2001–2002	Fransa-Pax	30	(4)
2002–2006	Sporting Goa	126	(28)
2006–2007	East Bengal	32	(4)
2007–2011	Sporting Goa	130	(28)
2011–2014	Santa Cruz	118	(36)

International career
2000–2012	India	64	(8)

Managerial career
- 2017–2023: India U17
- 2023–2025: Bengaluru B
- 2025–2026: India U20
- 2025–2026: India U17
- 2026–: India U15
- 2026–: India B (assistant)
- * Club domestic league appearances and goals

Bibiano Fernandes (born 2 December 1976) is an Indian football manager and former football player who serves as the head coach of the India U15 national team. He also served as the coach of the Bengaluru B team. Under his coaching India won SAFF under-15 championship in 2017 and 2019. India U16 had also reached the 2018 AFC U-16 Championship Quarter finals eventually losing out to South Korea U16 in his reign. He is regarded as one of the great coaches in India. Under his tenure, India qualified for AFC Under-16 Championship for two times, which is India's ninth appearance in the Championship.

== Playing career ==
Bibiano mostly played all his stints at Goan clubs, from Churchill Brothers to Santa Cruz FC. He once signed for East Bengal in 2006 for a year contract.

He made only one appearance for India in 2005 internationally.

In 2025, a charity match was organized between India All Stars vs Brazil All Stars in Chennai where he scored a goal. India All Stars lost by 2–1.

== Coaching career ==
=== India U-17 ===
After departure of Luis Norton de Matos, head coach of India for FIFA U-17 World Cup 2017 hosted by India, Bibiano took charge of India U-17 and led them to SAFF Under-15 Championships with three back-to-back titles in 2017, 2019 and 2023.

Under his tenure, India qualified for AFC Under-17 Asian Cups thrice consecutively (2020 edition got cancelled due to COVID-19 still India qualified for the tournament). The team had witnessed a brilliant run in various tournaments and was lauded by various pundits. In 2018 AFC Under-16 Championship in Malaysia, he led India to Quarter-Finals after 16 years, since they last made up to 2002 and narrowly missed a FIFA U-17 World Cup spot losing to South Korea by 1–0.

=== Bengaluru Reserves and Academy ===
Bibiano was signed up by Bengaluru FC as Reserves Coach for a 3-year deal. There he won titles in BDFA and Puttaiah Memorial Cups and once reached semi-finals in Reliance Foundation Development League in 2024 where BFC "B" lost to Muthoot FA in penalties. He left the club in 2025.

=== India U-20 ===
AIFF called back Fernandes for taking up the head coach role for India U-20 team considering his splendid performance with U-17 team in 7 years. India won the 2025 SAFF U-19 Championship hosted in Arunachal Pradesh, India after he took charge in no time.
