= 2017–18 BDFA Super Division =

BDFA Super Division
- Season: 2017–18
- Champions: Ozone (2nd title)
- Relegated: RWF; FC Deccan
- Matches: 55

The 2017–18 BDFA Super Division was the fifteenth season of the BDFA Super Division which is the third tier of the Indian association football system and the top tier of the Karnataka football system. The season started on 10 November 2017. Madras Engineering Group (MEG) were the defending champions. Bangalore Independents and Jawahar Union were promoted from 'A' Division, whereas a new team FC Deccan was a direct entry team. AGORC and DYES teams were relegated to 'A' Division. Bengaluru FC fielded their newly launched reserve team, Bengaluru FC 'B'. All games were played at Bangalore Football Stadium.

Ozone F.C. won their second title, winning all ten games, whereas RWF and FC Deccan were relegated to 'A' division.

== Teams ==
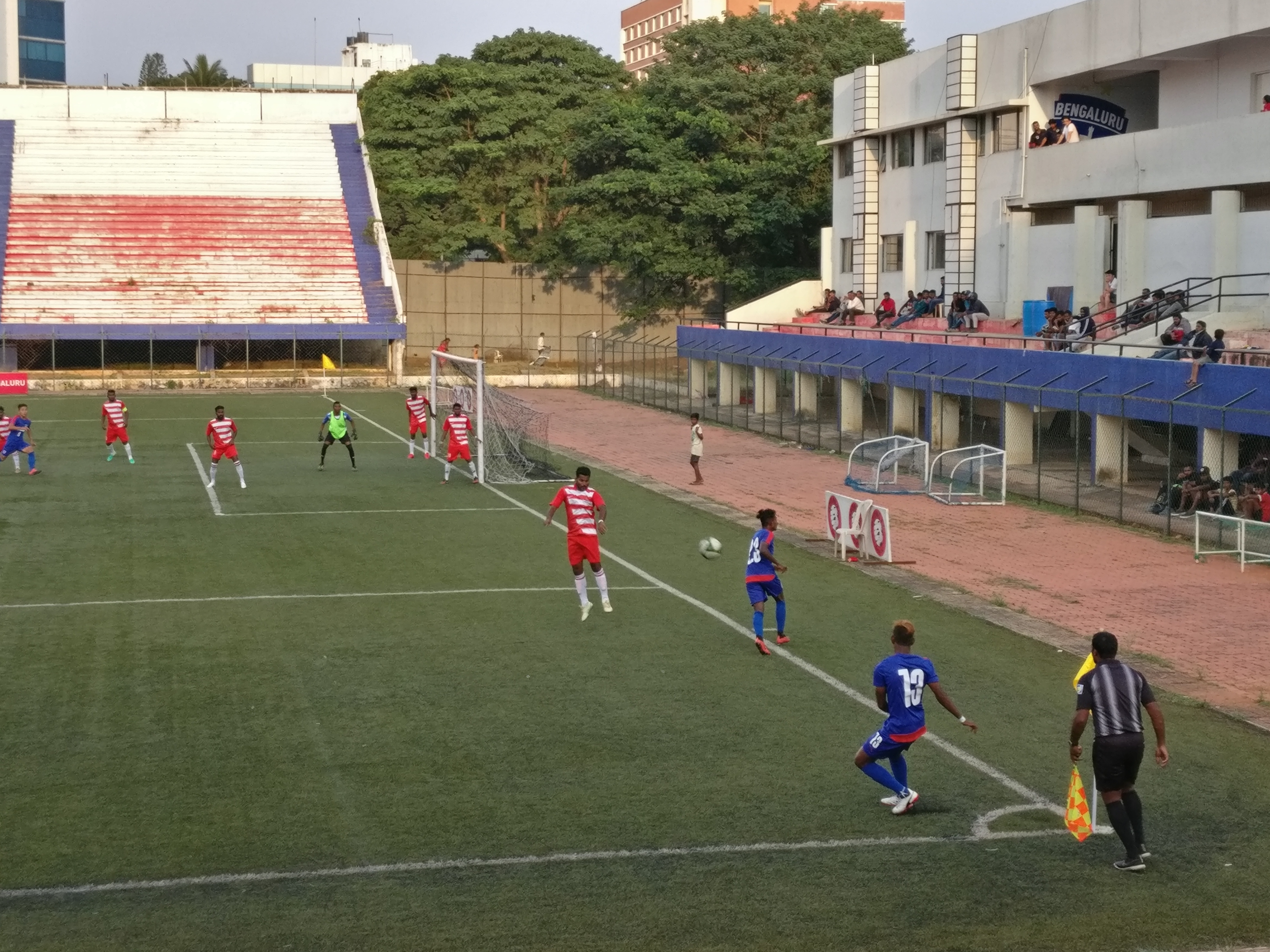
Bengaluru FC vs CIL kicked off 2017–18 edition.

Club
Army Service Corps (ASC)
Bangalore Independents
Bengaluru FC 'B'
Controllerate of Inspection Electronics (CIL)
FC Deccan
Jawahar Union
Madras Engineer Group (MEG)
Ozone FC
Railway Wheel Factory (RWF)
South United
Students Union

== Table ==
Pos	Team	Pld	W	D	L	GF	GA	GD	Pts	Qualification or relegation
1	Ozone (C)	10	10	0	0	33	5	+28	30	Champions
2	Students Union	10	7	1	2	30	14	+16	22	
3	MEG	10	7	1	2	28	15	+13	22	
4	Bengaluru FC 'B'	10	7	1	2	19	7	+12	22	
5	South United	10	5	1	4	24	20	+4	16	
6	Bangalore Independents	10	4	1	5	16	13	+3	13	
7	ASC	10	3	2	5	13	14	−1	11	
8	CIL	10	3	0	7	12	25	−13	9	
9	Jawahar Union	10	2	2	6	20	18	+2	8	
10	RWF (R)	10	1	1	8	12	40	−28	4	Relegation to 'A' Division
11	FC Deccan (R)	10	1	0	9	7	43	−36	3	Relegation to 'A' Division

Source: Garden City Soccer
Rules for classification: 1) points; 2) goal difference; 3) number of goals scored
(C) Champions; (R) Relegated

== Results ==
Home \ Away	ASC	BFC	BI	CIL	FCD	JU	MEG	OFC	RWF	SUFC	SU
ASC	—	0–1	1–2	3–1	3–0	2–0	1–2	0–3	2–2	0–2	1–1
Bengaluru FC 'B'	—	—	3–1	2–0	1–0	0–0	2–1	0–1	6–0	3–2	1–2
Bangalore Independents	—	—	—	0–1	6–0	2–1	0–1	0–1	3–2	1–1	1–2
CIL	—	—	—	—	1–3	3–2	1–2	1–4	3–0	1–6	0–3
FC Deccan	—	—	—	—	—	0–4	1–3	1–8	1–3	0–5	1–9
Jawahar Union	—	—	—	—	—	—	2–2	1–3	8–0	0–3	2–3
MEG	—	—	—	—	—	—	—	2–4	4–1	7–1	4–2
Ozone	—	—	—	—	—	—	—	—	5–0	3–1	1–0
RWF	—	—	—	—	—	—	—	—	—	2–3	2–5
South United	—	—	—	—	—	—	—	—	—	—	1–3
Students Union	—	—	—	—	—	—	—	—	—	—	—

Source: Garden City Soccer
