= 2019–20 Indian Elite League =

U18 football league in India

Elite League
- Season: 2019–20
- Dates: 25 November 2019 – 11 March 2020
- Champions: –
- Matches played: 248 (Matches after 14 March 2020 were cancelled)
- Goals scored: 734 (2.96 per match)
- Biggest home win: RF Young Champs 9–0 Oscar SSE (21 January 2020)
- Biggest away win: Oscar SSE 0–7 RF Young Champs (15 December 2019)
- Highest scoring: RF Young Champs 9–0 Oscar SSE (21 January 2020)
- All statistics correct as of 18 April 2020. Season postponed

The 2019–20 Elite League, also known as 2019–20 Hero Elite League for sponsorship reasons, was the twelfth season of the Indian Elite League and the fifth season of the competition as an under-18 one. Punjab F.C. were the defending champions.

On 18 April 2020, All India Football Federation, the organising body of the league announced that the league would be called off due to coronavirus pandemic.

== Zonal round ==
Tiebreakers
The teams are ranked according to points (3 points for a win, 1 point for a draw, 0 points for a loss). If two or more teams are equal on points on completion of the group matches, the following criteria are applied in the order given to determine the rankings:
1. Greater number of points obtained in the matches between the Teams concerned
2. Goal difference resulting from the matches between the Teams concerned
3. Greater number of goals scored in the matches between the Teams concerned
4. Goal difference in all the matches
5. Greater number of goals scored in all the matches
6. Drawing of lots

As of 18 April 2020

=== Maharashtra zone ===
The matches of Maharashtra zone kicked off on 25 November 2019 with Kenkre defeating Mumbaikars 5–1 in the opening game.

Pos	Team	Pld	W	D	L	GF	GA	GD	Pts	Qualification	RFYC	IB	IFA	FSI	IRS	KFC	FCM	OS
1	RF Young Champs	14	13	0	1	47	7	+40	39	Advanced to zonal round	—	1–0	2–1	5–0	5–1	2–0	3–0	9–0
2	Iron Born FC	14	8	5	1	19	8	+11	29	Advanced to zonal round	1–0	—	0–0	0–0	1–0	3–2	1–0	4–1
3	Indian Football Academy	14	8	3	3	28	10	+18	27		1–2	1–1	—	2–0	4–0	2–1	6–0	1–1
4	Football School of India	14	5	4	5	18	18	0	19		1–3	1–1	2–1	—	0–2	2–2	1–0	3–0
5	India Rush Steadfast	14	4	3	7	19	24	−5	15		2–3	2–3	0–4	0–3	—	1–0	1–1	6–0
6	Kenkre	14	3	4	7	15	18	−3	13		0–3	0–0	1–2	0–0	0–0	—	0–1	1–0
7	FC Mumbaikars	14	3	1	10	11	30	−19	10		0–2	0–1	0–1	0–4	0–4	1–5	—	5–1
8	Oscar SSE	14	1	2	11	6	48	−42	5		0–7	0–3	0–2	2–1	0–0	1–3	0–3	—

Source: Soccerway

=== Chennai & Bengaluru zone ===
Pos	Team	Pld	W	D	L	GF	GA	GD	Pts	Qualification	BFC	RVSS	OFB	SSF	CFC	BJFS	FCM
1	Bengaluru FC	12	11	1	0	43	6	+37	34	Advanced to Final round	—	3–2	1–0	2–0	0–0	7–0	7–0
2	Raman Vijayan Soccer School	12	8	0	4	32	20	+12	24	Advanced to Final round	2–5	—	4–3	3–1	2–1	5–0	5–1
3	Ozone FC	12	5	3	4	26	12	+14	18		0–1	2–0	—	1–1	4–0	4–0	7–1
4	Stadium Sports Foundation	12	5	3	4	22	15	+7	18		0–3	1–2	1–0	—	0–0	1–0	5–1
5	Chennaiyin	12	4	4	4	16	14	+2	16		1–5	0–2	0–0	0–0	—	3–0	2–0
6	Boca Juniors Football School	12	2	2	8	14	39	−25	8		0–5	3–2	1–1	2–5	0–3	—	6–1
7	FC Madras	12	0	1	11	11	58	−47	1		1–4	0–3	2–4	1–7	1–6	2–2	—

Source: Soccerway

=== Delhi, Jaipur & Punjab zone ===
Pos	Team	Pld	W	D	L	GF	GA	GD	Pts	Qualification	PFC	OFC	SFC	BBFS	YFC	UPFC	CF	MPS
1	Punjab	14	10	4	0	33	3	+30	34	Advanced to Final round	—	0–0	1–0	1–1	5–0	4–0	3–0	7–0
2	Odisha FC	14	9	4	1	45	12	+33	31	Advanced to Final round	2–2	—	1–3	1–1	2–0	4–0	6–0	5–0
3	Sudeva	14	9	1	4	33	13	+20	28		0–3	0–2	—	4–1	5–0	1–0	4–1	3–1
4	Bhaichung Bhutia Football Schools	14	5	3	6	20	21	−1	18		0–1	2–5	1–6	—	1–1	4–0	0–1	3–0
5	Youth Football Club	14	5	2	7	12	29	−17	17		0–1	1–7	0–4	1–0	—	1–1	1–0	2–0
6	United Punjab	14	4	4	6	13	24	−11	16		0–3	0–0	0–0	0–2	3–2	—	1–1	3–1
7	Conscient Football	14	4	2	8	13	25	−12	14		0–0	3–5	1–0	0–2	0–1	1–2	—	2–0
8	Maximus Prime Sports	14	0	0	14	3	45	−42	0		0–2	0–5	1–3	0–2	0–2	0–3	0–3	—

Source: Soccerway

=== Goa zone ===
The matches of Goa zone kicked off on 21 December 2019 with a 2–2 draw between Sesa Football Academy and Sporting Goa.

Pos	Team	Pld	W	D	L	GF	GA	GD	Pts	Qualification	FCG	DSC	SFC	SCG	SFA
1	FC Goa	8	5	2	1	13	5	+8	17	Advanced to Final round	—	1–1	3–1	1–0	1–0
2	Dempo	8	5	2	1	12	4	+8	17	Advanced to Final round	0–3	—	6–0	2–0	1–0
3	Salgaocar	8	4	0	4	7	11	−4	12		1–0	0–1	—	2–0	1–0
4	Sporting Goa	8	1	3	4	4	10	−6	6		0–0	0–0	0–2	—	2–1
5	Sesa Football Academy	8	1	1	6	6	12	−6	4		2–4	0–1	1–0	2–2	—

Source: Soccerway

=== Kolkata zone ===
Pos	Team	Pld	W	D	L	GF	GA	GD	Pts	Qualification	ATK	USC	QEB	BFA	SAI	BM	MB	BSC
1	ATK	13	12	0	1	36	6	+30	36	Advanced to Final round	—	1–0	4–0	2–0	5–1	5–1	5–1	3–0
2	United SC	14	10	1	3	25	6	+19	31	Advanced to Final round	2–1	—	1–0	2–0	5–0	1–1	2–0	1–0
3	East Bengal	14	10	0	4	23	11	+12	30		0–1	2–0	—	4–0	2–0	2–0	2–1	3–0
4	Bengal Football Academy	14	6	1	7	16	22	−6	19		0–1	0–4	2–1	—	0–3	1–0	2–0	3–0
5	SAI-Kolkata	14	4	1	9	11	24	−13	13		0–2	0–3	0–1	2–3	—	0–0	1–0	2–0
6	Bidhannagar Municipal SA	14	2	5	7	9	17	−8	11		1–2	0–2	0–1	2–0	0–1	—	1–1	2–0
7	Mohun Bagan	12	2	3	7	7	17	−10	9			1–0	0–1	1–1	2–1	0–0	—	
8	Baranagar SC	13	2	1	10	5	29	−24	7		0–4	0–2	2–4	0–4	1–0	1–1	1–0	—

Updated to match(es) played on 7 March 2020. Source: Soccerway

=== Shillong & Assam zone ===
Pos	Team	Pld	W	D	L	GF	GA	GD	Pts	Qualification	NFA	RDU	SAI	SLG
1	NRL Football Academy	0	0	0	0	0	0	0	0	Advanced to Final round	—			
2	Rangdajied United	0	0	0	0	0	0	0	0	Advanced to Final round		—		
3	SAI-Guwahati	0	0	0	0	0	0	0	0				—	
4	Shillong Lajong	0	0	0	0	0	0	0	0					—

Updated to match(es) played on unknown. Source: AIFF

=== Jharkhand & Odisha zone ===
The matches of Jharkhand & Odisha zone kicked off on 15 February 2020 with a 2–2 draw between SAIL Football Academy Bokaro and Dhanbad Football Academy.

Pos	Team	Pld	W	D	L	GF	GA	GD	Pts	Qualification	JFC	SHO	DFA	SAJ	SFA	FAO
1	Jamshedpur	6	5	1	0	20	3	+17	16	Advanced to Final round	—			6–0	4–1	5–0
2	Sports Hostel Odisha	6	4	2	0	13	3	+10	14	Advanced to Final round	0–0	—	2–1			7–0
3	Dhanbad Football Academy	7	3	1	3	11	10	+1	10		0–2		—	2–0	3–2	
4	Sports Authority of Jharkhand	7	3	0	4	5	11	−6	9			0–1	2–0	—	2–1	1–0
5	SAIL Football Academy Bokaro	7	1	1	5	11	17	−6	4		2–3	2–3	2–2		—	
6	FAO Academy	7	1	1	5	1	17	−16	4			0–0	0–3	1–0	0–1	—

Updated to match(es) played on 11 March 2020. Source: Soccerway

== Statistics ==
=== Top scorers ===
As of 18 April 2020

Rank	Player	Club	Goals
1	Akshunna Tyagi	Odisha FC	20
2	Rishabh Dobriyal	Odisha FC	18
3	Sivasakthi Narayanan	Raman Vijayan SS	17
4	Shubho Paul	Sudeva FC	14
4	Akashdeep Singh	Bengaluru FC	14
6	Bishnu Bordoloi	ATK	13
7	Ashangam Aphoaba Singh	Punjab FC	11
7	Ojas Kamat	Ozone	11
9	Kamalesh P	Raman Vijayan SS	9
9	Deepak Chetri	United SC	9

=== Cleansheets ===
As of 18 April 2020

Rank	Player	Club	Clean sheets
1	Jaskaranvir Singh	Punjab FC	12
2	Deep Nandy	United	9
3	Dipesh Chauhan	Bengaluru FC	8
4	Bacchu Das	East Bengal	7
5	Khoirom Jackson Singh	Reliance Foundation YC	6
5	Ryan Souza	Dempo	6
