= 2025–26 Inter Kashi season =

Inter Kashi
2025–26 season
- Owner: RDB Group of Companies
- Head coach: Abhijit Mondal (Super Cup); Deepak Deshwal (Gold Cup); Antonio López Habas (Indian Super League); Abhijit Mondal (Indian Super League)
- Stadium: Indira Gandhi Athletic Stadium (Pre 2026); Scamper Park (Post 2026-Beginning of Indian Super League); Kalinga Stadium (Indian Super League) Jawaharlal Nehru Stadium (Indian Super League) Kishore Bharati Krirangan (Indian Super League)
- Indian Super League: Ongoing
- Super Cup: Group stage
- Gold Cup: Quarter-finals
- Biggest defeat: 3–0 v FC Goa, 29 October 2025 (Super Cup)
Home colours	Away colours	Third colours

The 2025–26 season is the third season of Inter Kashi in existence and the first season in the top tier of Indian football. The club is currently participated in Super Cup and their reserve team participated in Sikkim Gold Cup and will compete in the Indian Super League, the top tier of the Indian football pyramid.

== Current staff ==
Position	Name
Head coach	(India) Abhijit Mondal
Goalkeeping coach	(India) Arindam Bhattacharya
Goalkeeping coach	(India) Abhijit Mondal
Player Care Manager	(India) Abdeali Fatema Deesawala
Media Manager	(India) Bhaswar Dey

== Players ==
=== First-team squad ===
As of 17 April 2026

Note: Flags indicate national team as defined under FIFA eligibility rules; some limited exceptions apply. Players may hold more than one non-FIFA nationality.

No.	Pos.	Nation	Player
1	GK	IND	Shubham Dhas
2	DF	IND	Nishchal Chandan
3	DF	IND	Aritra Das
4	MF	ESP	David Humanes
5	DF	IND	Wayne Vaz
6	MF	IND	Tomba Singh
7	FW	ESP	Alfred Planas
8	MF	IND	Prasanth K
9	MF	IND	Rohit Danu
10	MF	IND	Jayesh Rane
11	FW	LTU	Nauris Petkevičius
12	FW	IND	Seiminlen Doungel

No.	Pos.	Nation	Player
13	GK	ESP	Lluis Tarres
14	MF	IND	Karthik Panicker
15	DF	IND	Ashray Bhardwaj
16	DF	IND	Sandip Mandi
17	DF	IND	Anil Chawan
18	DF	IND	Narender Gahlot
19	FW	IND	Ashish Jha
20	MF	IND	Mohammed Asif Khan
21	GK	IND	Mohit Singh Dhami
22	DF	IND	Nishu Kumar
23	MF	ESP	Sergio Llamas
24	DF	IND	Prabir Das
25	FW	IND	Sumeet Passi (captain)

== Transfers ==
=== Transfers in ===
Date	Position	Nationality	Name	From	Fee	Ref.
1 June 2025	FW	(India)	Harmanpreet Singh	(Andorra) Inter Club d'Escaldes	Loan Return	
24 October 2025	DF	(India)	Prabir Das	(India) Kerala Blasters	None	
25 October 2025	DF	(India)	Nishchal Chandan	(India) Churchill Brothers		
26 October 2025	DF	(India)	Wayne Vaz	(India) Rajasthan United	None	
26 October 2025	GK	(India)	Mohit Singh Dhami	(India) Diamond Harbour	None	
26 October 2025	FW	(India)	Ashish Jha	(India) SC Bengaluru	None	
7 January 2026	GK	(Spain)	Lluis Tarres	(Spain) Getafe CF B		
14 January 2026	MF	(Spain)	Sergio Llamas	(Italy) Gravina		
16 January 2026	FW	(Spain)	Alfred Planas	(India) Gokulam Kerala		
16 January 2026	DF	(India)	Nishu Kumar	(India) Jamshedpur		
16 January 2026	MF	(Spain)	David Humanes	(Andorra) Inter Club d'Escaldes		
16 January 2026	FW	(India)	Seiminlen Doungel	(India) Calicut FC		
16 January 2026	MF	(India)	Jayesh Rane			
28 January 2026	FW	(Lithuania)	Nauris Petkevičius	(Lithuania) FK Sūduva	None	
30 January 2026	DF	(India)	Narender Gahlot	(India) Odisha FC		
30 January 2026	DF	(India)	Rohit Danu	(India) Bengaluru FC		
13 February 2026	MF	(India)	Prasanth Mohan	(India) Calicut FC		
13 February 2026	MF	(India)	Mohammed Asif Khan	(India) Calicut FC		

=== Transfers Out ===
Date	Position	Nationality	Name	To	Ref.
1 June 2025	FW	(India)	Bryce Miranda	(India) Kerala Blasters	Loan Return
1 June 2025	FW	(India)	Bidyashagar Singh	(India) Bhawanipore FC	
10 June 2025	MF	(Spain)	David Humanes	(Andorra) Inter Club d'Escaldes	
25 June 2025	MF	(India)	Sk Sahil	(India) Police AC	
28 June 2025	DF	(India)	Narayan Das	(India) United Kolkata Sports Club	
14 July 2025	DF	(India)	Sarthak Golui	(India) Jamshedpur FC	
15 July 2025	DF	(India)	Bijoy Varghese	(India) Punjab FC	
15 July 2025	MF	(Finland)	Joni Kauko	(Finland) FC KTP	
30 August 2025	FW	(India)	Prasanth Mohan	(India) Calicut FC	
8 September 2025	GK	(India)	Sharon P	(India) Calicut FC	
16 September 2025	MF	(India)	Mohammed Asif Khan	(India) Calicut FC	
4 October 2025	MF	(Serbia)	Nikola Stojanović	(India) Jamshedpur FC	
1 January 2026	FW	(Serbia)	Matija Babovic	(India) SC Delhi	
3 January 2026	FW	(India)	Yaman Sheoran	(Japan) Tokyo 23 FC	
30 January 2026	FW	(India)	Harmanpreet Singh		
30 January 2026	DF	(India)	Deepak Devrani		
13 February 2026	MF	(India)	Phijam Vikash Siingh	(India) Morning Star FC	
13 February 2026	MF	(India)	Sweden Fernandes	(India) SC de Goa	
13 February 2026	FW	(India)	Chirag Bhujel		
13 February 2026	DF	(India)	Kojam Beyong		
15 April 2026	FW	(Spain)	Mario Barco	Retired	

== Pre-season ==
Win Draw Loss Fixtures

4 February 2026 Friendly	FC Madras Reserves and Academy	0-0	Inter Kashi	Chennai
				Stadium: Scamper Park; Attendance: 0 (Note: Closed door friendly match.)

9 February 2026 Friendly	Inter Kashi	2–0	Chennaiyin FC	Chennai
	Rohit Danu (?); Sergio Llamas (?)			Stadium: Scamper Park; Attendance: 0

== Competitions ==
Competition	First match	Last match	Starting round	Final position	Record							
Competition	First match	Last match	Starting round	Final position	Pld	W	D	L	GF	GA	GD	Win %
Super Cup	26 October 2025	1 November 2025	Group stage	Group stage	3	0	1	2	2	7	−5	0.00
Sikkim Gold Cup (Note: Inter Kashi fielded their reserve squad for the tournament.)	22 November 2025	22 November 2025	Quarter-finals	Quarter-finalists	1	0	0	1	1	3	−2	0.00
Indian Super League	14 February 2026	17 May 2026	Group Stage	TBD	3	1	2	0	3	2	+1	33.33
Total					7	1	3	3	6	12	−6	14.29

Last updated: 4 March 2026
Source: https://www.the-aiff.com/competitions/super-cup https://www.sofascore.com/football/tournament/india-amateur/sikkim-gold-cup/30850 https://www.fotmob.com/en-GB/teams/1562126/fixtures/inter-kashi,players

=== Super Cup ===
Inter Kashi participated in their 3rd edition of Super Cup held in Goa.

Pos	Team	Pld	W	D	L	GF	GA	GD	Pts	Qualification	GOA	NEU	JFC	INK
1	Goa (H)	3	2	0	1	6	2	+4	6	Advance to knockout stage		1–2	2–0	3–0
2	NorthEast United	3	1	2	0	6	5	+1	5				2–2	2–2
3	Jamshedpur	3	1	1	1	4	4	0	4					2–0
4	Inter Kashi	3	0	1	2	2	7	−5	1					

Source: AIFF
Rules for classification: 1)1) points; 2) head-to-head points; 3) head-to-head goal difference; 4) goal difference; 5) number of goals scored; 6) Penalty shoot-out if only two teams are tied and they met in the last round of the group; 7) Disciplinary points; 8) drawing of lots
(H) Hosts

==== Matches ====
26 October 2025	North East	2–2	Inter Kashi	Bambolim
16:30 IST	S.Ajaraie 18'; Zabaco 40'; Dinesh (yellow card) 45+1'	I-League; PDF Report	Harmanpreet Singh 5' (yellow card) 42'; Wayne Vaz (yellow card) 30'; Karthik Panicker 74'; Deepak Devrani (yellow card) 90+7'	Stadium: GMC Athletic Stadium; Attendance: 226; Referee: Harish Kundu; Man of the Match: Karthik Panicker (Inter Kashi)

29 October 2025	Goa	3–0	Inter Kashi	Fatorda
19:30 IST	Dražić 4'; Borja 38', 42'	I-League; PDF Report		Stadium: Jawaharlal Nehru Stadium; Attendance: 893; Referee: Ashwin; Man of the Match: Borja Herrera (Goa)

1 November 2024	Inter Kashi	0–2	Jamshedpur	Bambolim
16:30 IST		I-League; PDF Report	Messi Bouli 38'; Manvir 82'	Stadium: GMC Athletic Stadium; Attendance: 136; Referee: K Ramdasan

=== Sikkim Gold Cup ===
Inter Kashi also participated in the 41st Sikkim Gold Cup held at Paljor Stadium, Gangtok and fielded their reserve squad for the tournament. Inter Kashi started the tournament directly from the quarter-finals stage.

==== Bracket ====
Pre-Qualifying
(India) Sikkim Brotherhood	1
(India) Sikkim Himalayan	3
(Tibet) Tibetan NFA	0
(India) Sikkim Dragons	4
(India) GTA XI	1
(India) Sikkim Police	3
(India) Services	3
(India) Sikkim Aakraman	0

Pre-Quarter
(India) Rajasthan United	3
(India) Sikkim Himalayan	0
(India) Sikkim Dragons	2
(India) NEROCA	0
(India) Diamond Harbour	3
(India) Sikkim Police	1
(India) Services	1
(India) Sudeva Delhi	0

Quarterfinals
(Nepal) Church Boys United	1
(India) Rajasthan United	3
(India) Sikkim Dragons	2
(India) NorthEast United (R)	1
(India) Inter Kashi	1
(India) Diamond Harbour	3
(India) Services	1
(India) East Bengal (R)	0

Semifinals
(India) Rajasthan United	3
(India) Sikkim Dragons	2
(India) Diamond Harbour	0
(India) Services	2

Final
(India) Rajasthan United	1
(India) Services	0

22 November 2025 Quarter-final	Inter Kashi (India)	1–3	Diamond Harbour	Gangtok
14:00 IST	Sheoran 48'		Naro 33', 56'; Nawab 45+3'	Stadium: Paljor Stadium

=== Indian Super League ===
==== League table ====
Pos	Team	Pld	W	D	L	GF	GA	GD	Pts
8	Kerala Blasters	13	5	2	6	15	17	−2	17
9	NorthEast United	13	4	4	5	16	21	−5	16
10	Inter Kashi	13	3	4	6	11	17	−6	13
11	Odisha	13	2	5	6	14	22	−8	11 (Note: Head-to-head points: Odisha 3, Delhi 0.)
12	Delhi	13	2	5	6	13	17	−4	11

Source: Indian Super League
Rules for classification: 1) points; 2) goal difference; 3) number of goals scored; 4) head-to-head points; 5) head-to-head goal difference; 6) head-to-head goals scored; 7) fair play ranking; 8) drawing of lots.
(Note: Head-to-head record is used only after all the matches between the teams in question have been played).

==== Results summary ====
Overall								Home						Away					
Pld	W	D	L	GF	GA	GD	Pts	W	D	L	GF	GA	GD	W	D	L	GF	GA	GD
8	3	2	3	7	9	−2	11	1	0	2	2	5	−3	2	2	1	5	4	+1

Source: Indian Super League

==== Results by match ====
Match	1	2	3	4	5	6	7	8	9	10	11	12	13
Ground	A	A	A	A	H	H	A	H					
Result	D	D	W	L	L	L	W	W					
Position	7	7	6	7	9	11	8	8	8	8	8	9	10

Source: indiansuperleague.com
A = Away; H = Home; W = Win; D = Draw; L = Loss

==== Matches ====
Win Draw Loss Fixtures

14 February 2026 Round 1	FC Goa	1–1	Inter Kashi	Goa
19:30 IST	Drazic 84' (pen.); Rabeeh (yellow card) 86'	Report	Prasanth (yellow card) 22', (goal) 45+2'; Vaz (yellow card) 69'; Lluis Tarres (red card) 80'; Humanes (yellow card) 90+6'	Stadium: Jawaharlal Nehru Stadium; Attendance: 1,577; Referee: Crystal John; Man of the Match: Dejan Drazic (FC Go)

24 February 2026 Round 2	Odisha	0-0	Inter Kashi	Bhubaneswar
19:30 IST		Report		Stadium: Kalinga Stadium; Attendance: 2,421; Referee: K Ramdasan; Man of the Match: Amrinder Singh (Odisha FC)

28 February 2026 Round 3	Kerala Blasters	1–2	Inter Kashi	Kochi
17:00 IST	Muhammed Saheef (yellow card) 30'; Huidrom Naocha Singh (yellow card) 63'; Víctor Bertomeu 84'; Marlon Roos-Trujillo (yellow card) 88'	Report	Nauris Petkevicius 34'; Sandip Mandi (yellow card) 43'; Sumeet Passi (yellow card) 56'; Alfred Planas 78'	Stadium: Jawaharlal Nehru Stadium; Attendance: 7,586; Referee: Tejas Nagvenkar; Man of the Match: Nauris Petkevicius (Kashi)

6 March 2026 Round 4	Jamshedpur	1-0	Inter Kashi	Jamshedpur
19:30 IST	Vincy Barretto (red card) 19'; Messi Bouli (yellow card) 34'; Nikola Stojanovic (yellow card) 48'; Stephen Eze 57'; Mark Zothanpuia (yellow card) 83'; Manvir Singh (yellow card) 90+3'	Report	Rohit Danu (yellow card) 9'; Sergio Llamas (yellow card) 55'; Mohammed Asif Khan (yellow card) 83'	Stadium: JRD Tata Sports Complex; Attendance: 7,856; Referee: Pratik Mondal; Man of the Match: Stephen Eze (Jamshedpur FC)

15 March 2026 Round 5	Inter Kashi	1–2	Mumbai City	Kolkata
19:30 IST	Sumeet Passi (yellow card) 8'; Antonio Lopez (Manager) (red card) 45+2'; Prabir Das (yellow card) 45+4'; Rohit Danu 51'; Nauris Petkevicius (yellow card) 90+4'; Nishchal Chandan (yellow card) 90+10'	Report	Noufal PN 45+6'; Lallianzuala Chhangte 53'; Joni Kauko (yellow card) 80'; Valpuia (red card) 90+4'	Stadium: Kishore Bharati Krirangan; Attendance: 10; Referee: Surojit Das; Man of the Match: Noufal PN (Mumbai City FC)

22 March 2026 Round 6	Inter Kashi	1–3	Bengaluru	Kolkata
19:30 IST	Alfred Planas 38'; Prasanth (yellow card) 68'; Nishu Kumar (yellow card) 85'	Report	Lalremtluanga Fanai (yellow card) 8'; Ashique Kuruniyan 20'; Braian Sánchez 69', 90+8'; Monirul Molla (yellow card) 87'	Stadium: Kishore Bharati Krirangan; Attendance: 65; Referee: Aditya Purkayastha; Man of the Match: Braian Sánchez (Bengaluru FC)

7 April 2026 Round 7	Chennaiyin	1–2	Inter Kashi	Chennai
17:00 IST	Imran Khan (footballer) (yellow card) 24'; Farukh Choudhary (yellow card) 52'; Vignesh Dakshinamurthy (yellow card) 56'; Daniel Chima Chukwu 90+6'	Report	Alfred Planas (yellow card) 3', (goal) 46', 54'; Sergio Llamas (yellow card) 52'; Shubham Dhas (yellow card) 90+2'	Stadium: Jawaharlal Nehru Stadium; Attendance: 2,966; Referee: Ashwin Kumar; Man of the Match: Alfred Planas (Inter Kashi)

12 April 2026 Round 8	Inter Kashi	1–0	Mohemmadan	Kolkata
17:00 IST	Mohammed Asif Khan 16'; Sandip Mandi (yellow card) 88'; Narender Gahlot (yellow card) 90'	Report	Pukhrambam Dinesh Meitei (yellow card) 52'; Gaurav Bora (yellow card) 90+5'	Stadium: Kishore Bharati Krirangan; Attendance: 215; Referee: Senthil Nathan; Man of the Match: Mohammed Asif Khan (Inter Kashi)

20 April 2026 Round 9	East Bengal	3–0	Odisha	Margao
19:30 IST	Bipin 11'; Crespo (yellow card) 45'; Chakrabarti (yellow card) 52'; Søjberg (yellow card) 57'; Ezzejjari 70', 83'; Gupta (yellow card) 90+4'	Report	Sharma (yellow card) 28'; Thoiba (yellow card) 45+1'	Stadium: Fatorda Stadium; Attendance: 233; Referee: Lakshay; Man of the Match: Bipin Singh (East Bengal)
Note: The home match for East Bengal was shifted to Goa due to elections in West Bengal.

8 May 2026 Round 12	Mumbai City	1–2	East Bengal	Mumbai
19:30 IST	Brandon 8'; Zothanpuia (yellow card) 22'; Rehenesh (yellow card) 37'; Lachenpa (yellow card) 57'	Report	Chakrabarti (yellow card) 51'; Ezzejjari 58' (pen.); Sekar 71'; Vishnu (yellow card) 84'; Gill (yellow card) 88'; Sibille (yellow card) 90+7'	Stadium: Mumbai Football Arena; Attendance: 3,649; Referee: Lakshay; Man of the Match: Kevin Sibille (East Bengal)

11 May 2026 Round 9	East Bengal	0–0	Punjab	Kolkata
19:30 IST	Chakrabarti (yellow card) 15'; Rashid (yellow card) 31'; Miguel (yellow card) 45+1'	Report		Stadium: Salt Lake Stadium; Attendance: 17,435; Referee: Crystal John; Man of the Match: Prabhsukhan Singh Gill (East Bengal)

17 May 2026 Round 11	Mohun Bagan	1–1	East Bengal	Kolkata
19:30 IST	Alberto (yellow card) 25'; Cummings 90'	Report	Gill (yellow card) 59'; Lalrindika 85' (yellow card) 86' (yellow-red card) 90+8'	Stadium: Salt Lake Stadium; Attendance: 62,201; Referee: Venkatesh R. Man of the Match: Miguel Figueira (East Bengal)

21 May 2026 Round 13	Inter Kashi	1–2	East Bengal	Kolkata
19:30 IST	Moya 15'; Passi (yellow card) 54'; Doungel (yellow card) 82'	Report	Gupta (yellow card) 38'; Ezzejjari 50'; Rashid 73'; Gill (yellow card) 82'; Sekar (yellow card) 90+5'	Stadium: Kishore Bharati Krirangan; Attendance: 8,112; Referee: Aditya Purkayastha; Man of the Match: Mohammed Rashid (East Bengal)

Note: AIFF announced the 2025-26 season of Indian Super League's fixtures on 6 January 2025.

== Statistics ==
=== Goalscorers ===
Rank	Nat.	Player	Super Cup	Gold Cup	ISL	Total
1	(India)	Harmanpreet Singh	1	0	0	1
1	(India)	Karthik Panicker	1	0	0	1
1	(India)	Yaman Sheoran	0	1	0	1
