= 2024–25 Inter Kashi season =

Inter Kashi
2024–25 season
- Owner: RDB Group of Companies
- Head coach: Antonio López Habas (I-League); Carlos Fonseca (I-League, Super Cup); Arata Izumi (Durand Cup)
- Stadium: Kalyani Stadium
- I-League: Winners
- Super Cup: Quarter final
- Durand Cup: Group Stage
- Top goalscorer: League: Nikola Stojanović; All: Nikola Stojanović
- Highest home attendance: 1051
- Lowest home attendance: 115
- Average home league attendance: 691
- Biggest win: 5–1 v Delhi FC, 1 December 2024 (I-League)
- Biggest defeat: 6–2 v Gokulam Kerala, 24 January 2025 (I-League)
Home colours	Away colours	Third colours

The 2024–25 season was the second season of Inter Kashi in existence. The club participated in the Durand Cup and Super Cup and competed in I-League, the second tier of Indian football and finished as winners to get a promotion for the Indian Super League, the top tier of Indian football.

== Current staff ==
Position	Name
Head coach	(Spain) Antonio Lopez Habas
Assistant coaches	(Spain) Carlos Fonseca
Strength & conditioning coach	(Spain) Alberto Santana
Goalkeeping coach	(Spain) Fernando Llopis
Goalkeeping coach	(Spain) Luis García
Goalkeeping coach	(India) Abhijit Mondal
Player Care Manager	(India) Abdeali Fatema Deesawala
Media Manager	(India) Bhaswar Dey

== Players ==
=== First-team squad ===
As of May 2025

Note: Flags indicate national team as defined under FIFA eligibility rules; some limited exceptions apply. Players may hold more than one non-FIFA nationality.

No.	Pos.	Nation	Player
1	GK	IND	Shubham Dhas
2	MF	IND	Mohammed Asif Khan
3	DF	IND	Aritra Das
3	DF	IND	Bijoy Varghese
4	DF	ESP	David Humanes
7	MF	FIN	Joni Kauko
8	MF	IND	Phijam Vikash Singh
9	FW	ESP	Mario Barco
11	FW	IND	Bidyashagar Singh
13	GK	IND	Sharon Padattil
14	MF	IND	Karthik Panicker
15	MF	IND	Sweden Fernandes
16	DF	IND	Sandip Mandi
17	DF	IND	Anil Chawan

No.	Pos.	Nation	Player
18	MF	IND	Tomba Singh
19	FW	IND	Chirag Bhujel
20	MF	SRB	Nikola Stojanović
21	DF	IND	Narayan Das
22	DF	IND	Ashray Bhardwaj
23	DF	IND	Sarthak Golui
24	DF	IND	Kojam Beyong
25	FW	IND	Sumeet Passi (captain)
25	FW	SRB	Matija Babović
26	DF	IND	Deepak Devrani
28	FW	IND	Prasanth Mohan
29	GK	IND	Arindam Bhattacharya
-	MF	IND	Sk Sahil

== New contracts ==
Date	Position	No.	Player	Ref.
24 July 2024	DF	3	(Japan) Anand Usuda	

== Transfers ==
=== Loans In ===
Date from	Position	Nationality	Name	From	Date until	Ref.
20 July 2024	DF	(India)	Dettol Moirangthem	(India) Classic FA	31 August 2024	
16 January 2025	FW	(India)	Bryce Miranda	(India) Kerala Blasters	31 May 2025	

=== Transfers in ===
Date	Position	Nationality	Name	From	Fee	Ref.
1 July 2024	DF	(India)	Deepak Devrani	(India) Punjab FC	None	
15 July 2024	FW	(India)	Chirag Bhujel	(India) Lakecity FC	None	
22 July 2024	MF	(Serbia)	Nikola Stojanović	(India) Gokulam Kerala	None	
22 July 2024	FW	(India)	Harmanpreet Singh	(India) Namdhari	None	
23 July 2024	MF	(India)	Karthik Panicker	(India) Garhwal FC	None	
26 July 2024	DF	(India)	Ashray Bhardwaj	(India) Sudeva Delhi	None	
27 July 2024	MF	(India)	Prasanth Mohan	(India) Punjab	None	
29 July 2024	FW	(India)	Sweden Fernandes	(India) Chennaiyin	None	
30 July 2024	DF	(India)	Aritra Das	(India) Kerala Blasters	Undisclosed fee + Buy-back clause	
31 July 2024	MF	(India)	William Pauliankhum	(India) Rajasthan United	None	
2 August 2024	FW	(India)	Bidyashagar Singh	(India) Punjab	None	
19 August 2024	MF	(Finland)	Joni Kauko	(India) Mohun Bagan	None	
4 September 2024	DF	(India)	Narayan Das	(India) Goa	None	
6 September 2024	DF	(India)	Sarthak Golui	(India) East Bengal	None	
12 September 2024	DF	(Spain)	David Humanes	(Spain) Antequera	None	
3 October 2024	GK	(India)	Rakshit Dagar	(India) Jamshedpur	None	
6 October 2024	FW	(Morocco)	Domi Berlanga	(Andorra) Inter d'Escaldes	None	
12 January 2025	MF	(India)	Sheikh Sahil	(India) SC Bengaluru		
13 January 2025	FW	(Serbia)	Matija Babović	(India) Dempo SC		
28 January 2025	DF	(India)	Bijoy Varghese	(India) Kerala Blasters	None	
29 January 2025	DF	(India)	Sachu Siby	(Andorra) Inter Club d'Escaldes	Loan Return	

=== Loans To ===
Date from	Position	Nationality	Name	To	Date until	Ref.
29 August 2024	DF	(India)	Sachu Siby (Note: Due to his visa not being approved, he couldn't go to Andorra for a loan transfer.)	(Andorra) Inter Club d'Escaldes	28 January 2025	
29 August 2024	FW	(India)	Harmanpreet Singh	(Andorra) Inter Club d'Escaldes	31 May 2025	

=== Transfers Out ===
Date	Position	Nationality	Name	To	Ref.
1 June 2024	FW	(India)	Muhammad Ajsal	(India) Kerala Blasters	Loan Return
1 June 2024	MF	(India)	Gyamar Nikum	(India) Mumbai City	Loan Return
1 June 2024	DF	(India)	Bijoy Varghese	(India) Kerala Blasters	Loan Return
1 June 2024	DF	(India)	Deepak Devrani	(India) Punjab	Loan Return
1 June 2024	DF	(India)	Tejas Krishna	(India) Punjab	Loan Return
1 June 2024	MF	(Spain)	Fran Gómez	(Spain) Atlético Madrid B	Loan Return
1 June 2024	DF	(India)	Sanson Pereira	(India) Goa	Loan Return
30 June 2024	MF	(India)	Jackichand Singh		
30 June 2024	DF	(India)	Lalruatthara	(India) Aizawl	
30 June 2024	GK	(India)	Nikhil Deka	(India) Mohammedan SC Reserves	Free Transfer
1 July 2024	FW	(India)	Ishan Dey		
7 July 2024	FW	(Cape Verde) (Netherlands)	Gianni dos Santos		
7 July 2024	DF	(England)	Peter Hartley		Retired
22 August 2024	DF	(India)	Keisam Angelo Singh	(India) KLASA	Free Transfer
30 August 2024	DF	(Japan)	Anand Usuda		
31 August 2024	DF	(India)	Dettol Moirangthem	(India) Classic FA	Loan Return
31 October 2024	FW	(Spain)	Jordan Lamela	(India) SC Bengaluru	
1 September 2024	MF	(India)	William Pauliankhum	(India) Rajasthan United FC	Free Transfer
29 January 2025	DF	(India)	Sachu Siby	(India) Mohammedan SC	
31 January 2025	GK	(India)	Rakshit Dagar	(India) Gokulam Kerala FC	
1 February 2025	MF	(Spain)	Julen Pérez del Pino		Mutually Terminated
19 March 2025	FW	(Morocco)	Domi Berlanga		Sacked
14 May 2025	FW	(India)	Edmund Lalrindika	(India) East Bengal FC	Undisclosed fee

== Pre-season ==
Win Draw Loss Fixtures

20 July 2024 Friendly	East Bengal	2–1	Inter Kashi	Kolkata
18:00 IST	Mahesh ?'; Lalhlansanga ?' (pen.)	Report	Chirag Bhujel ?'	Stadium: Center of Excellence Ground; Attendance: 0 (Note: Closed door friendly match.)

21 September 2024 Friendly	Inter Kashi	9-0	Sefali Basu'r Swapno Suru Football Academy	Kolkata
IST		Report		Stadium: Kalyani Stadium

28 September 2024 Friendly	Inter Kashi	6-1	Shankhanagar Milan Sangh	Kolkata
IST		Report		Stadium: Kalyani Stadium

4 October 2024 Friendly	Inter Kashi	12-0	Dakshindari Sports Club	Kolkata
IST		Report		Stadium: Kalyani Stadium

10 October 2024 Friendly	Inter Kashi	8-0	City Athletic Club	Kolkata
IST	Domingo Berlanga; Mario Barco; Joni Kauko; Kojam Beyong; Bidyashagar Singh	Report		Stadium: Kalyani Stadium

22 October 2024 Friendly	Inter Kashi	4-1	Mohammedan SC	Kolkata
IST	Joni Kauko ?'; Narayan Das ?'; Karthik Panicker ?'; Mario Barco ?'	Report	? ?'	Stadium: Kalyani Stadium

3 November 2024 Friendly	Inter Kashi	10-0	Pyarabagan Sports Club	Kolkata
IST		Report		Stadium: Kalyani Stadium

8 November 2024 Friendly	Santosh Trophy West Bengal	0-2	Inter Kashi	Kolkata
IST		Report	Sumeet Passi 47'; Domingo Berlanga 88'	Stadium: Kalyani Stadium

11 November 2024 Friendly	Adamas United SA	v	Inter Kashi	Kolkata
IST		Report		Stadium: Adamas United Sports Academy

16 November 2024 Friendly	Inter Kashi	13-0	Airport Boys	Kolkata
IST		Report		Stadium: Kalyani Stadium

== Mid-season ==
Win Draw Loss

Fixtures

15 March 2024 Practice Match	Inter Kashi	4-0	Bally Athletic Club	Kolkata
				Stadium: Kalyani Stadium

== Competitions ==
=== Super Cup ===
Round of 16
20 April
8	Kerala Blasters	2
9	East Bengal	0
21 April
2	Goa	3
IL4	Gokulam Kerala	0
21 April
7	Odisha	0
10	Punjab	3
23 April
3	Bengaluru	1 (3)
IL2	Inter Kashi (p)	1 (5)
23 April
6	Mumbai City	4
11	Chennaiyin	0
24 April
4	Northeast United	6
13	Mohammedan	0
24 April
5	Jamshedpur	2
12	Hyderabad	0

Quarter-finals
26 April
8	Kerala Blasters	1
1	Mohun Bagan	2
26 April
2	Goa	2
10	Punjab	1
27 April
IL2	Inter Kashi	0
6	Mumbai City	1
27 April
4	Northeast United	0 (4)
5	Jamshedpur (p)	0 (5)

Semi-finals
30 April
1	Mohun Bagan	1
2	Goa	3
30 April
6	Mumbai City	0
5	Jamshedpur	1

Final
3 May
2	Goa	3
5	Jamshedpur	0

==== Matches ====
Win Draw Loss Fixtures

23 April 2025 Round of 16	Bengaluru	1—1 (3–5 p)	Inter Kashi	Bhubaneswar
16:30 IST (UTC+5:30)	Williams 62'	AIFF; I-League; PDF	Babović 87'	Stadium: Kalinga Stadium; Attendance: 3,216; Referee: Venkatesh Ramachadran; Man of the Match: Nikola Stojanović (Inter Kashi)
	Penalties
	Díaz (penalty scored); Williams (penalty scored); Noguera (penalty missed); Chhetri (penalty scored)		(penalty scored) Babović; (penalty scored) Varghese; (penalty scored) Muñoz; (penalty scored) Das; (penalty scored) Stojanović

27 April 2025 Quarter final	Inter Kashi	0—1	Mumbai City	Bhubaneswar
16:30 IST (UTC+5:30)		Report; PDF	Chhangte 72'	Stadium: Kalinga Stadium; Attendance: 1,120; Referee: Tejas Visvasrao Nagvenkar; Man of the Match: Jorge Ortiz (Mumbai City)

=== I-League ===
==== League table ====
Pos	Team	Pld	W	D	L	GF	GA	GD	Pts	Promotion or relegation
1	Inter Kashi (C, P)	22	12	6	4	42	31	+11	42 (Note: Inter Kashi was awarded and then stripped of points in multiple rulings. The Court of Arbitration for Sport ultimately ruled in their favor, restoring four deducted points.)	Promotion to ISL and qualification for Super Cup (April) and (October)
2	Churchill Brothers	22	11	7	4	45	25	+20	40 (Note: Churchill Brothers were deducted one point and awarded two, which were later revoked by the Court of Arbitration for Sport. Churchill Brothers challenged this decision in Federal Supreme Court of Switzerland, which was dismissed, preventing further changes in points table.)	
3	Real Kashmir	22	10	7	5	31	25	+6	37 (Note: The forfeit win originally awarded to Real Kashmir was revoked by CAS in favor of Inter Kashi.)	
4	Gokulam Kerala	22	11	4	7	45	29	+16	37 (Note: Head-to-head: Real Kashmir 4, Gokulam Kerala 1)	Qualification for Super Cup (April) and (October)
5	Rajasthan United	22	9	6	7	34	33	+1	33	Qualification for Super Cup (October)

Source: I-League
Rules for classification: 1) Points; 2) Head-to-head points; 3) Head-to-head goal difference; 4) Total goal difference; 5) Total goals scored; 6) Drawing of lots
(Note: Head-to-head applies only after all relevant matches are played)
(C) Champions; (P) Promoted

==== Matches ====
Win Draw Loss Fixtures

Note: I-League announced the 2024–25 season fixtures on 24 October 2024.

22 November 2024 1	Inter Kashi	1–0	Sporting Club Bengaluru	Nadia
19:00 UTC+5:30	Nikola (yellow card) 34'; David (yellow card) 62'; Narayan (yellow card) 69'; Edmund 72'; Kauko (yellow card) 90+4'	Report	Shravan Shetty (yellow card) 90'	Stadium: Kalyani Stadium; Attendance: 1,051; Referee: Surojit Das (India); Man of the Match: Edmund (Inter Kashi)

1 December 2024 2	Inter Kashi	5–1	Delhi	Nadia
19:00 UTC+5:30	Passi (C) (yellow card) 30'; Domingo Berlanga Ouggouti 32', 57', 59'; Lalrindika 62'; Nikola Stojanović 68'	Report	Stephen Acquah (yellow card) 41'; Himanshu Jangra 71' (pen.); Vanlalhriatzuala K (yellow card) 90+4'	Stadium: Kalyani Stadium; Attendance: 1,033; Referee: Mohammed Junaid Saijad Tanji (India); Man of the Match: Domingo Berlanga Ouggouti (Inter Kashi)

5 December 2024 3	Shillong Lajong FC	0–0	Inter Kashi	East Khasi Hills
19:00 UTC+5:30	Ken (yellow card) 10'; Ronney Willson Kharbudon (yellow card) 41'; Daniel Gonçalves (yellow card) 90'	Report	Domingo Berlanga Ouggouti (yellow card) 90'; Passi (C) (yellow card) 90+3'	Stadium: SSA Stadium; Attendance: 3,922; Referee: Mithun Kumar Kundu (India); Man of the Match: Phrangki Buam (Shillong Lajong FC)
Note: Antonio Lopez Habas (Coach) (yellow card) 55' (Inter Kashi)

9 December 2024 4	Real Kashmir FC	1–1	Inter Kashi	Srinagar
14:00 UTC+5:30	M.Inam (yellow card) 4'; Lalramsanga 8', (yellow card) 25'; Ocran Conney Idan (yellow card) 37'; Issah (C) (yellow card) 59'	Report	Domingo Berlanga Ouggouti (yellow card) 34', (goal) 70'	Stadium: TRC Football Turf; Attendance: 4,000; Referee: I Jamal Mohamed (India); Man of the Match: Domingo Berlanga Ouggouti (Inter Kashi)
Note: Ishfaq Ahmed (Coach) (yellow card) 26' (Real Kashmir FC)

14 December 2024 5	Inter Kashi	1–3	Churchill Brothers FC Goa	Nadia
19:00 UTC+5:30	Narayan (yellow card) 38'; Arindam (GK) (yellow card) HT'; Sumeet Passi (C) 50'; Julen Perez Del Pino (yellow card) 63'; Lalrindika (yellow card) 70'; Mario Barco (yellow card) 72'	Report	Wayde Lekay 18'; Pape Gassama 39' (pen.); Lamgoulen Semkholun 69'; Sayad Bin Abdul Kadir (GK) (yellow card) 90+1'	Stadium: Kalyani Stadium; Attendance: 797; Referee: Arvind Sekhar A (India); Man of the Match: Sebastián Gutiérrez (Churchill Brothers FC Goa)
Note: Alberto Santana (Strength and conditioning coach) (yellow card) 60' (Inter Kashi)

20 December 2024 6	Inter Kashi	3–1	Sreenidi Deccan Football Club	Nadia
19:00 UTC+5:30	Mario Barco 47', 59' (pen.); Karthik Panicker (yellow card) 73' (yellow card) 84' (yellow-red card); Arindam (GK) (yellow card) 81'; Kauko 90+5'	Report	Rosenberg Gabriel (yellow card) 7'; D. Castaneda 33'; Emboklang Nongkhlaw (yellow card) 57'; Shayesteh (C) (yellow card) 57'	Stadium: Kalyani Stadium; Attendance: 115; Referee: Shantan Agrawal (India); Man of the Match: Mario Barco (Inter Kashi)
Note: Antonio López Habas (Coach) (yellow card) 85' (Inter Kashi)

10 January 2025 7	Dempo Sports Club	0–1	Inter Kashi	South Goa
15:30 UTC+5:30	Vieri Colaco (yellow card) 4'; Pruthvesh Pednekar (yellow card) 38'; Ali (C) (yellow card) 50'	Report	Kauko 88'; Narayan (yellow card) 63'	Stadium: PJN Stadium; Attendance: 500; Referee: Kishor Gangaram Choudhary (India); Man of the Match: Joni Kauko (Inter Kashi)

13 January 2025 8	Namdhari FC	0-3 (Note: Inter Kashi were awarded three points after Namdhar fielded an ineligible player in Match 45. Initially Namdhari won the match by 2–0. However, later AIFF Appeal Committee reverted the decision later that was again reverted back in favour of Inter Kashi by an appeal to Court of Arbitration of Sports.) (Initial 2–0 Voided)	Inter Kashi	Ludhiana
14:00 UTC+5:30	Bhupinder Singh 13'; Francis Nuer Addo 85'; Lamine (yellow card) 22' (yellow card) 54' (yellow-red card)	Report	Sarthak (yellow card) 7'; Anil Chawan (yellow card) 45+4'; Karthik Panicker (yellow card) 58'; Nikola (yellow card) 78'	Stadium: Namdhari Stadium; Attendance: 500; Referee: Dipu Roy (India); Man of the Match: Bhupinder Singh
Note: Harpreet Singh (Coach) (yellow card) 72' (Namdhari FC); Amrinder Singh (Staff) (red card) 90+4' (Namdhari FC); Carlos Agustin Fonseca (Assistant Coach) (red card) 90+4' (Inter Kashi)

18 January 2025 9	Inter Kashi	4–3	Aizawl FC	Nadia
19:00 UTC+5:30	Danmawia 61' (o.g.); Bryce 65'; Nikola 70'; Edmund 83'	Report	Augustine Lalrochana 5'; Rinzuala 22', 82' (pen.)	Stadium: Kalyani Stadium; Attendance: 650; Referee: Mohammed Junaid Saijad Tanji (India); Man of the Match: Nikola Stojanović (Inter Kashi)
Note: R Lalruatfela (Assistant Coach) (yellow card) 90' (Aizawl FC)

24 January 2025 10	Gokulam Kerala FC	6–2	Inter Kashi	Kozhikode
19:00 UTC+5:30	Siniša Stanisavić 10', 30', 73'; Labeledo 45+3', 90+5'; S Llamas (C) 51' (yellow card) 77'	Report	Bryce 3'; Matija Babović 27'; Kojam Beyong (yellow card) 33'; Julen Pérez del Pino (yellow card) 40'	Stadium: EMS Corporation Stadium; Attendance: 3210; Referee: K Ramdasan (India); Man of the Match: Nacho Abeledo (Gokulam Kerala FC)

28 January 2025 11	Rajasthan United FC	1–1	Inter Kashi	Jaipur
15:30 UTC+5:30	Amangeldiev (yellow card) 27'; Martand Raina 45+2'; Luis Mateo Caprile Redes (yellow card) 90+5'	Report	Bidyashagar 31'	Stadium: Vidhyadhar Nagar Stadium; Attendance: 700; Referee: I Jamal Mohamed (India); Man of the Match: Martand Raina (Rajasthan United FC)

1 February 2025 12	Inter Kashi	3–2	Gokulam Kerala FC	Nadia
19:00 UTC+5:30	Sumeet Passi (C) (yellow card) 19'; Domingo Berlanga Ouggouti 43', 65'; Narayan (yellow card) 46'; Nikola 70' (pen.)	Report	Abhijith K (yellow card) 23' (goal) 40'; Siniša Stanisavić 74'; Sebastian Zo (yellow card) 85'	Stadium: Kalyani Stadium; Attendance: 279; Referee: Surojit Das (India); Man of the Match: Domingo Berlanga Ouggouti (Inter Kashi)

7 February 2025 13	Inter Kashi	0-2	Dempo	Nadia
19:00 UTC+5:30	Mandi (yellow card) 23', (yellow card) 36' (yellow-red card); Sarthak (yellow card) 54'; Mohammed Asif (yellow card) 90+3'	Report	Kapil (yellow card) 39'; Cristian Damián Pérez Roa 42', 81'; Pruthvesh Pednekar (yellow card) 90+2'	Stadium: Kalyani Stadium; Attendance: 800; Referee: Lalit Singh Rawat (India); Man of the Match: Cristian Damián Pérez Roa (Dempo SC)

11 February 2025 14	Aizawl FC	0-3	Inter Kashi	Aizawl
19:00 UTC+5:30	Kimkima (C) (yellow card) 45'; H Lalrempuia (yellow card) 45+1'; Rinzuala (yellow card) 59'; Lalthankhuma (yellow card) 62'	Report	Nikola 14' (pen.), 90'; Kauko 19'; Sarthak (yellow card) 45+4'; Bryce (yellow card) 74'	Stadium: RG Stadium; Attendance: 1150; Referee: Pratik Mondal (India); Man of the Match: Nikola Stojanović (Inter Kashi)
Note: F Lalrinmawia (Manager) (red card) 43' (Aizawl FC)

18 February 2025 15	SC Bengaluru	0–0	Inter Kashi	Bangalore
16:00 UTC+5:30	Thomyo L Shimray (yellow card) 67'	Report	Mario Barco (yellow card) 90+4'	Stadium: Bangalore Football Stadium; Attendance: 354; Referee: Mithun Kumar Kundu (India); Man of the Match: Clarence Savio Fernandes (SC Bengaluru)

26 February 2025 16	Delhi FC	0–1	Inter Kashi	Hoshiarpur
14:00 UTC+5:30	Gill (yellow card) 19'; Debnath Mondal (GK) (red card) 45+3'; Lalmuansanga (GK) (yellow card) 70'; Laken (yellow card) 89'; Vinil Poojary (C) (yellow card) 89'	Report	BijoyVB (yellow card) 26'; Nikola 77'; Domingo Berlanga Ouggouti (yellow card) 89'; Mario Barco (yellow card) 90+10'	Stadium: Mahilpur Football Stadium; Attendance: 8650; Referee: Mrutyunjay L Amatya (India); Man of the Match: Nikola Stojanović (Inter Kashi)
Note: Ranjit Bajaj (Owner) (yellow card) 81' (Delhi FC)

2 March 2025 17	Inter Kashi	1-3 (Note: The match was forfeited in favour of Real Kashmir as Inter Kashi fielded an ineligible player. Initially Real Kashmir already won the match by 1-3. On 18 July 2025, the Court of Arbitration for Sport ruled in favour of Inter Kashi, revoked the forfeiture previously awarded to Real Kashmir.)	Real Kashmir FC	Nadia
19:00 UTC+5:30	Bijoy V (yellow card) 45+1'; Kauko (yellow card) 59'; Narayan (yellow card) 85'; Mario Barco 90+5'	Report	Elhadji Abdou Karim Samb 37'; Hyder Yousuf (yellow card) 44'; Paulo Cezar Pereira dos Santos 45+5'; Muhammad Hammad (C) (yellow card) 56'; Aminou Bouba (yellow card) 74'; Gnohere Krizo 90+6'	Stadium: Kalyani Stadium; Attendance: 300; Referee: Lakshay (India); Man of the Match: Elhadji Abdou Karim Samb (Real Kashmir FC)

6 March 2025 18	Inter Kashi	3-2 (Note: Inter Kashi were deducted three points and given to Namdhari for fielding an ineligible player. Initially Inter Kashi won the match by 3-2. On 18 July 2025, the Court of Arbitration for Sport ruled in favour of Inter Kashi, revoked the three points previously awarded to Namdhari in the return leg.)	Namdhari FC	Nadia
19:00 UTC+5:30	Humanes (yellow card) 41'; Nikola 48'; Passi (C) 70'; Edmund 71'; Mario Barco (yellow card) 76'; Mohammed Asif (yellow card) 86'	Report	Harpreet (yellow card) 54'; Akashdeep (yellow card) 64'; Degol 67' (pen.); Francis Nuer Addo (yellow card) 73'; Dharmpreet Singh 82'	Stadium: Kalyani Stadium; Attendance: 923; Referee: Harish Kundu (India); Man of the Match: Nikola Stojanović (Inter Kashi)

19 March 2025 19	Sreenidi Deccan FC	2–2	Inter Kashi	Hyderabad
19:00 UTC+5:30	Eli Sabia (yellow card) 22'; B Tluanga (yellow card) 45+2'; D Castaneda 48'; Brandon 72'; Romawia (yellow card) 90+3'; Shayesteh (C) (yellow card) 90+7'	Report	Prasanth 17'; Passi (C) (yellow card) 45+1'; Bidyashagar 90+1'; Arindam (GK) (yellow card) 90+3'	Stadium: Deccan Arena; Attendance: 450; Referee: Aditya Purkayastha (India); Man of the Match: Brandon Vanlalremdika (Sreenidi Deccan FC)

24 March 2025 20	Inter Kashi	2–1	Shillong Lajong FC	Nadia
19:00 UTC+5:30	Passi (C) (yellow card) 31'; Nikola 32' (yellow card) 80'; Mario Barco 39'	Report	Batskhemlang Thangkhiew 77'	Stadium: Kalyani Stadium; Attendance: 657; Referee: Jehrul Islam (India); Man of the Match: Mario Barco (Inter Kashi)

30 March 2025 21	Churchill Brothers FC Goa	2-2 (Note: Inter Kashi were deducted one point and two points were given to Churchill Brothers, after Inter Kashi fielded an ineligible player. Initially the match was drawn by 2–2. On 18 July 2025, the Court of Arbitration for Sport revoked the two points previously awarded to Churchill Brothers from Inter Kashi match.)	Inter Kashi	South Goa
16:30 UTC+5:30				Stadium: Raia Panchayat Ground; Referee: (India)

6 April 2025 22	Inter Kashi	3-1	Rajasthan United FC	Nadia
19:00 UTC+5:30				Stadium: Kalyani Stadium; Referee: (India)

=== Durand Cup ===
The 133rd edition of Durand Cup saw first appearance of Inter Kashi. They were placed with hosts Mohammedan, Bengaluru FC and Indian Navy in Group B.

==== Group stage ====
Pos	Team	Pld	W	D	L	GF	GA	GD	Pts	Qualification	BEN	MSC	IKA	INV
1	Bengaluru	3	3	0	0	10	2	+8	9	Advanced to knockout stage			3–0	4–0
2	Mohammedan (H)	3	1	1	1	4	4	0	4		2–3		1–1	1–0
3	Inter Kashi	3	1	1	1	3	5	−2	4					
4	Indian Navy	3	0	0	3	1	7	−6	0				1–2	

Source: Twitter
Rules for classification: Group stage tiebreakers
(H) Hosts

===== Matches =====
28 July 2024	Mohammedan	1–1	Inter Kashi FC	Kolkata
19:00 IST	Dipu (yellow card) 31'; Ashley Koli 66'; Joseph Lalmuanawma (yellow card) 71'; Jasim (yellow card) 90+3'; Soraisam Robinson Singh (yellow card) 90+4'	Report	Nikola 39'; Dettol Moirangthem (yellow card) 84'; Mohammed Asif (yellow card) 90+5'	Stadium: Kishore Bharati Krirangan; Attendance: 4,829; Referee: Senthil Nathan S Man of the Match: Anand Usuda (Inter Kashi)

3 August 2024	Bengaluru FC	3–0	Inter Kashi FC	Kolkata
19:00 IST	Nikhil (yellow card) 5'; Édgar 17' (pen.); Ripoll (yellow card) 51', (goal) 77'; Sana (yellow card) 57'; Chhetri 82'	Report	Anand Usuda (yellow card) 85'	Stadium: Kishore Bharati Krirangan; Attendance: 435; Referee: Crystal John; Man of the Match: Noguera (Bengaluru FC)

9 August 2024	Indian Navy	1–2	Inter Kashi FC	Kolkata
16:00 IST	Pradeesh C (yellow card) 7'; Pintu (yellow card) 32'; Novin 53'	Report	Mandi (yellow card) 52'; Nikola 65'; Tomba 66'	Stadium: Kishore Bharati Krirangan; Attendance: 112; Referee: Ashish Tiwari; Man of the Match: Nikola Stojanović (Inter Kashi FC)
