= 2023–24 Inter Kashi season =

2023–24 season of Inter Kashi

Inter Kashi
2023–24 season
- Owner: RDB Group of Companies
- Head coach: Carlos Santamarina
- Stadium: Various
- I-League: 4th
- Super Cup: Group stage
- Top goalscorer: League: Mario Barco (12); All: Mario Barco (14)
- Highest home attendance: 2,687 (v. Mohammedan, 21 November 2023)
- Lowest home attendance: 123 (v. Gokulam Kerala, 9 February 2024)
- Average home league attendance: 524
- Biggest win: 5–0 v Rajasthan United, 8 January 2024 (Super Cup)
- Biggest defeat: 4–0 v Real Kashmir, (Away); 28 November 2023 (I-League)
Home colours	Away colours

The 2023–24 season was the first season of Inter Kashi in existence. The club participated in the I-League, the second level of Indian football.

In May 2023, the All India Football Federation, the governing body of football in India, announced they would accept bids for new clubs to join 2023–24 I-League season onwards. On 29 June 2023, it was announced that agreement for the Varanasi franchise had been reached between Kolkata-based RDB Group of Companies and European clubs Atlético Madrid and Inter Escaldes. FC Andorra had an association with Inter Escaldes, but did not have any direct role with Inter Kashi. The moniker of "Inter" was added because of the tie-up with Inter Escaldes.

== Current staff ==
Position	Name
Head coach	(Spain) Carlos Santamarina
Assistant coaches	(Spain) Javier Broch
Assistant coaches	(India) Arata Izumi
Fitness coach	(Spain) Dani Lorenzo

== Players ==
=== First-team squad ===
As of 1 January 2024

Note: Flags indicate national team as defined under FIFA eligibility rules; some limited exceptions apply. Players may hold more than one non-FIFA nationality.

No.	Pos.	Nation	Player
1	GK	IND	Shubham Dhas
3	DF	IND	Bijoy Varghese (on loan from Kerala Blasters)
4	DF	IND	Klusner Pereira
5	DF	ENG	Peter Hartley
6	MF	IND	Keisam Angelo Singh
7	FW	ESP	Jordan Lamela
8	MF	IND	Phijam Vikash Singh
9	FW	ESP	Mario Barco
10	MF	ESP	Julen Pérez
11	FW	IND	Ishan Dey
16	DF	IND	Sandip Mandi
17	FW	IND	Edmund Lalrindika (on loan from Bengaluru)
18	DF	IND	Tejas Krishna (on loan from Punjab)
20	DF	IND	Kojam Beyong

No.	Pos.	Nation	Player
21	FW	CPV	Gianni dos Santos
22	MF	IND	Jackichand Singh
24	MF	ESP	Fran Gómez (on loan from Atlético Madrid B)
25	FW	IND	Sumeet Passi
26	DF	IND	Deepak Devrani (on loan from Punjab)
27	DF	IND	Anil Chawan
28	MF	IND	Sehnaj Singh
29	GK	IND	Arindam Bhattacharya (captain)
33	FW	IND	Muhammad Ajsal (on loan from Kerala Blasters)
36	MF	IND	Asif Khan
39	DF	IND	Lalruatthara
43	GK	IND	Nikhil Deka
44	MF	IND	Haobam Singh
77	MF	IND	Gyamar Nikum (on loan from Mumbai City)
—	DF	IND	Sanson Pereira (on loan from Goa)

== Transfers ==
=== Transfers in ===
Date	Position	Nationality	Name	From	Fee	Ref.
1 August 2023	DF	(England)	Peter Hartley	(England) Hartlepool United	None	
1 August 2023	DF	(India)	Klusner Pereira	(India) Dempo SC	None	
4 August 2023	MF	(India)	Sehnaj Singh	(India) NorthEast United	None	
28 August 2023	FW	(India)	Ishan Dey	(India) Sudeva Delhi	None	
1 September 2023	FW	(India)	Sumeet Passi	(India) East Bengal	None	
5 September 2023	FW	(Spain)	Jordan Lamela	(Spain) Antoniano	None	
8 September 2023	FW	(Spain)	Mario Barco	(Spain) Numancia	None	
9 September 2023	DF	(India)	Anil Chawan	(India) Bengaluru United	None	
11 September 2023	GK	(India)	Sharon Padattil	(India) Bengaluru	None	
12 September 2023	GK	(India)	Arindam Bhattacharya	(India) NorthEast United	None	
13 September 2023	MF	(India)	Jackichand Singh	(India) Mumbai City	None	
15 September 2023	MF	(India)	Asif Khan	(India) Mumbai City	None	
16 September 2023	DF	(India)	Kojam Beyong	(India) Rajasthan United	None	
16 September 2023	DF	(India)	Sandip Mandi	(India) Diamond Harbour	None	
16 September 2023	MF	(India)	Haobam Singh	(India) East Bengal	None	
16 September 2023	MF	(India)	Keisam Angelo Singh	(India) Jamshedpur B	None	
16 September 2023	MF	(India)	Phijam Vikash Singh	(India) Jamshedpur FC	None	
20 September 2023	MF	(Spain)	Julen Pérez	(Spain) Las Palmas B	None	
11 October 2023	DF	(India)	Lalruatthara	(India) Odisha	None	
13 October 2023	GK	(India)	Nikhil Deka	(India) NorthEast United	None	
1 January 2024	FW	(Cape Verde) (Netherlands)	Gianni dos Santos	(Canada) Atlético Ottawa	None	
26 March 2024	FW	(India)	Edmund Lalrindika	(India) Bengaluru FC	Undisclosed Transfer Fee	

=== Loans in ===
Date from	Position	Nationality	Name	From	Date until	Ref.
17 August 2023	FW	(India)	Muhammad Ajsal	(India) Kerala Blasters	31 May 2024	
2 September 2023	FW	(India)	Edmund Lalrindika	(India) Bengaluru	31 May 2024	
3 September 2023	MF	(India)	Gyamar Nikum	(India) Mumbai City	31 May 2024	
15 September 2023	DF	(India)	Bijoy Varghese	(India) Kerala Blasters	31 May 2024	
14 October 2023	DF	(India)	Deepak Devrani	(India) Punjab	31 May 2024	
14 October 2023	DF	(India)	Tejas Krishna	(India) Punjab	31 May 2024	
4 January 2024	MF	(Spain)	Fran Gómez	(Spain) Atlético Madrid B	31 May 2024	
14 January 2024	DF	(India)	Sanson Pereira	(India) Goa	31 May 2024	

=== Transfers Out ===
Date	Position	Nationality	Name	To	Ref.
19 January 2024	DF	(India)	Klusner Pereira	(India) SC de Goa	

== Pre-season ==
Win Draw Loss Fixtures

18 September 2023 Friendly	East Bengal	2–2	Inter Kashi	Kolkata
16:00 IST

22 September 2023 Friendly	Goa	4–1	Inter Kashi	Margao
16:00 IST			Lalrindika ?'	Stadium: Fatorda Stadium

4 October 2023 Friendly	Dempo	0–0	Inter Kashi	Panjim
16:00 IST				Stadium: Dempo Academy Ground

14 October 2023 Friendly	Pax of Nagoa SC	2–6	Inter Kashi	Verna
16:00 IST			Barco ??', ??', ??'; Lalrindika ??'; Dey ??'	Stadium: Nagoa Football Ground

== Competitions ==
=== I-League ===
==== League table ====
Pos	Team	Pld	W	D	L	GF	GA	GD	Pts
2	Sreenidi Deccan	24	14	6	4	54	26	+28	48
3	Gokulam Kerala	24	12	6	6	55	34	+21	42
4	Inter Kashi	24	11	8	5	47	41	+6	41
5	Real Kashmir	24	11	7	6	36	19	+17	40
6	Delhi	24	11	2	11	44	40	+4	35

Source: I-League
Rules for classification: 1) Points; 2) Head-to-head points; 3) Head-to-head goal difference; 4) Total goal difference; 5) Total number of goals scored; 6) drawing of lots
(Note: Head-to-head record is used only after all the matches between the teams in question have been played).

==== Matches ====
Win Draw Loss Fixtures

Note: I-League announced the fixtures for the 2023–24 season on 6 October 2023.

28 October 2023 1	Gokulam Kerala	2–2	Inter Kashi	Kozhikode
19:00 UTC+5:30	Álex Sánchez 8'; Noufal PN 54'	Report	Lalrindika 29'; Asif 90+2'	Stadium: EMS Stadium; Attendance: 19,764; Referee: Mrutyunjay Amatya (India); Man of the Match: Álex Sánchez (Gokulam Kerala)

3 November 2023 2	Sreenidi Deccan	4–1	Inter Kashi	Hyderabad
16:30 UTC+5:30	Rosenberg Gabriel 38'; Pawan Kumar 56'; Lalnuntluanga Bawitlung 77'; R Lalbiakliana 85'	Report	Mario Barco 90+3'	Stadium: Deccan Arena; Referee: K. Ramdasan (India); Man of the Match: Rosenberg Gabriel (Sreenidi Deccan)

6 November 2023 3	Namdhari	2–4	Inter Kashi	Bhaini Sahib
14:00 UTC+5:30	Harmanpreet Singh 14'; Imanol Arana 90+3'	Report	Jordan Lamela 52'; Mario Barco 56', 84'; Haobam Singh 90+5'	Stadium: Namdhari Stadium; Referee: Akashkumar Mehta (India); Man of the Match: Mario Barco (Inter Kashi)

17 November 2023 4	Churchill Brothers	1–2	Inter Kashi	Vasco
19:00 UTC+5:30	Ricardo Dichiara 38'	Report	Jackichand Singh 52'; Gyamar Nikum 87'	Stadium: Tilak Maidan; Referee: Lakshay (India); Man of the Match: Gyamar Nikum (Inter Kashi)

21 November 2023 5	Inter Kashi	0–2	Mohammedan	Lucknow
14:00 UTC+5:30		Report	Eddie Hernández 44'; Wahengbam Angousana 50'	Stadium: Ekana Football Stadium; Referee: Tejas Nagvenkar (India); Man of the Match: Wahengbam Angousana (Mohammedan)

28 November 2023 6	Real Kashmir	4–0	Inter Kashi	Srinagar
14:00 UTC+5:30	Mohammad Inam Wani 30'; Carlos Lomba 66'; Gnohere Krizo 83'; Mohamad Maksoud 90+5'	Report		Stadium: TRC Turf Ground; Referee: Anand Rana (India); Man of the Match: Mohammad Inam (Real Kashmir)

1 December 2023 7	NEROCA	1–3	Inter Kashi	Kalyani
19:00 UTC+5:30	Meitei 63'	Report	Lamela 28', 45+5'; J. Singh 90+4'	Stadium: Kalyani Stadium; Referee: Kynsanphar Lyngdoh Nongum (India); Man of the Match: Jordan Lamela (Inter Kashi)

6 December 2023 8	Rajasthan United	2–2	Inter Kashi	Hyderabad
16:30 UTC+5:30	Denzell 40' (pen.); Mandi 51' (o.g.)	Report	Passi 4'; Nikum 24'	Stadium: Deccan Arena; Referee: Mrutyunjay Amatya (India); Man of the Match: Richard Gadze (Rajasthan)

10 December 2023 9	TRAU	3–0	Inter Kashi	Kalyani
16:30 UTC+5:30	Danish Aribam 9'; Deepak Singh 22'; Abraham Okyere 76'	Report		Stadium: Kalyani Stadium; Referee: Lalit Singh Rawat (India); Man of the Match: Danish Aribam (TRAU)

15 December 2023 10	Inter Kashi	2–0	Delhi	Kalyani
14:00 UTC+5:30	Md. Asif 14'; Lamela 36'	Report		Stadium: Kalyani Stadium; Referee: Dipu Roy (India); Man of the Match: Jordan Lamela (Inter Kashi)

21 December 2023 11	Aizawl	1–1	Inter Kashi	Aizawl
19:00 UTC+5:30	Md. Asif 43'	Report	Lalhmangaihkima 88'	Stadium: Rajiv Gandhi Stadium; Referee: Mithun Kumar (India); Man of the Match: Nora Fernandes (Aizawl)

3 February 2024 12	Shillong Lajong	0–1	Inter Kashi	Shillong
19:00 UTC+5:30		Report	Gianni dos Santos 24'	Stadium: SSA Stadium; Attendance: 5,812; Referee: Jehrul Islam; Man of the Match: Gianni dos Santos (Inter Kashi)

9 February 2024 13	Inter Kashi	2–4	Gokulam Kerala	Kalyani
19:00 UTC+5:30	Phijam Vikash Singh 23'; Mario Barco 86'	Report	Álex Sánchez 30'; Abhijith Kurungodan 39'; Nikola Stojanović 74', 90+3'	Stadium: Kalyani Stadium; Attendance: 123; Referee: Pranjal Banerjee; Man of the Match: Nikola Stojanović (Gokulam Kerala)

14 February 2024 14	Inter Kashi	1–1	Churchill Brothers	Kalyani
19:00 UTC+5:30	Muhammad Ajsal 56'	Report	Emmanuel Essien 52'	Stadium: Kalyani Stadium; Attendance: 259; Referee: K. Lyngdoh Nongum; Man of the Match: Muhammad Ajsal (Inter Kashi)

18 February 2024 15	Inter Kashi	4–1	Namdhari	Kalyani
19:00 UTC+5:30	Lalrindika 3'; Deepak Devrani 15'; Mario Barco 52'; Haobam Singh 80'	Report	Stephen 36'	Stadium: Kalyani Stadium; Attendance: 127; Referee: Lalit Singh Rawat; Man of the Match: Gyamar Nikum (Inter Kashi)

24 February 2024 16	Inter Kashi	1–1	Real Kashmir	Kalyani
16:30 UTC+5:30	Mario Barco 77'	Report	Henry Kisekka 90+6'	Stadium: Kalyani Stadium; Attendance: 447; Referee: Ashish Tiwari; Man of the Match: Mohammad Inam (Real Kashmir)

27 February 2024 17	Inter Kashi	3–1	NEROCA	Kalyani
16:30 UTC+5:30	Lalrindika 45+3'; Md. Asif 67'; Mario Barco 73'	Report	Lourembam David Singh 53'	Stadium: Kalyani Stadium; Attendance: 187; Referee: Williams Joy Koshy; Man of the Match: Edmund Lalrindika (Inter Kashi)

2 March 2024 18	Inter Kashi	1–1	Rajasthan United	Kalyani
16:30 UTC+5:30	Mario Barco 40'	Report	Lalchungnunga Chhangte 28'	Stadium: Kalyani Stadium

8 March 2024 19	Inter Kashi	6–3	TRAU	Kalyani
19:00 UTC+5:30	Nikum 12'; Ajsal 26', 55'; Lamela 78'; Mohammed Asif 90'; Gianni dos Santos 90+8'	Report	Sardor Jakhonov 43' (pen.); Issahak Nuhu Seidu 63', 85'	Stadium: Kalyani Stadium; Attendance: 752; Referee: Jatinder Singh; Man of the Match: Muhammad Ajsal (Inter Kashi)

13 March 2024 20	Delhi	0–2	Inter Kashi	Bhaini Ala
15:30 UTC+5:30		Report	Haobam 76'; Hartley 79'	Stadium: Namdhari Stadium; Referee: Surojit Das; Man of the Match: Peter Hartley (Delhi)

18 March 2024 21	Inter Kashi	5–4	Aizawl	Kalyani
19:00 IST	Lalrindika 3'; Nikum 14'; Jordan Garrido 33'; Barco 86', 89'	Report	Passi 29' (o.g.); Lalrinzuala Lalbiaknia 44', 61'; Lalbiakdika Vanlalvunga 83'	Stadium: Kalyani Stadium; Attendance: 325; Referee: Ajay Krishnan; Man of the Match: Mario Barco (Inter Kashi)

22 March 2024 22	Inter Kashi	2–1	Shillong Lajong	Kalyani
19:00 UTC+5:30	Barco 32'; Tejas Krishna 45'	Report	Paulino 55' (pen.)	Stadium: Kalyani Stadium; Attendance: 232; Referee: Pratik Mondal; Man of the Match: Arindam Bhattacharya (Inter Kashi)

30 March 2024 23	Mohammedan	1–1	Inter Kashi	Naihati
18:30 UTC+5:30	Gómez 8'	Report	Barco 83'	Stadium: Naihati Stadium; Attendance: 2,000; Referee: Jehrul Islam; Man of the Match: Mario Barco (Inter Kashi)

8 April 2024 24	Inter Kashi	1–1	Sreenidi Deccan	Kalyani
19:00 UTC+5:30	Pérez 87' (pen.)	Report	Castañeda 41'	Stadium: Kalyani Stadium; Attendance: 455; Referee: Dipu Roy; Man of the Match: Julen Pérez (Inter Kashi)

=== Indian Super Cup ===
Inter Kashi entered the competition in the play-off round. Inter Kashi defeated Rajasthan United in the qualification round by 5–0 on 8 January, the fixtures were announced on 18 December 2023.

Pos	Team	Pld	W	D	L	GF	GA	GD	Pts	Qualification	OFC	FCG	BEN	IKA
1	Odisha	3	3	0	0	7	2	+5	9	Advance to knockout stage	—	3–2	1–0	3–0
2	Goa	3	2	0	1	5	4	+1	6		—	—	1–0	2–1
3	Bengaluru	3	0	1	2	1	3	−2	1		—	—	—	1–1
4	Inter Kashi	3	0	1	2	2	6	−4	1		—	—	—	—

Source: AIFF
Rules for classification: 1) points; 2) head-to-head points; 3) head-to-head goal difference; 4) goal difference; 5) number of goals scored; 6) drawing of lots

8 January 2024 2024 Indian Super Cup qualifier	Inter Kashi	5–0	Rajasthan United	Bhubaneswar
14:00 UTC+5:30	Barco 10', 75'; Lalrindika 58'; Haobam 87'; Ajsal 88'	Report		Stadium: Kalinga Stadium; Referee: Pranjal Banerjee (India); Man of the Match: Mario Barco (Inter Kashi)

8 January 2024 2024 Indian Super Cup GS	Goa	2–1	Inter Kashi	Bhubaneswar
14:00 UTC+5:30	Noah 58'; Martínez 66'	Report	Nikum 78'	Stadium: Kalinga Stadium; Man of the Match: Noah Sadaoui (Goa)

17 January 2024 2024 Indian Super Cup GS	Odisha	3–0	Inter Kashi	Bhubaneswar
19:30 UTC+5:30	Lalthathanga 45+2'; Maurício 60'; Vanlalruatfela 80'	Report		Stadium: Kalinga Stadium; Man of the Match: Diego Maurício (Odisha)

22 January 2024 2024 Indian Super Cup GS	Bengaluru	1–1	Inter Kashi	Bhubaneswar
14:00 UTC+5:30	Javi 58' (pen.)	Report	Lalrindika 15'	Stadium: Kalinga Stadium; Man of the Match: Ryan Williams (Bengaluru)

== Statistics ==
=== Goalscorers ===
As of 02 March 2024

The list is sorted by shirt number when total goals are equal.

Rnk	Pos	No.	Player	I League	Super Cup	Total
1	FW	9	(Spain) Mario Barco	9	2	11
2	MF	7	(Spain) Jordan Lamela	5	0	5
2	FW	17	(India) Edmund Lalrindika	3	2	5
2	DF	36	(India) Asif Khan	5	0	5
5	MF	77	(India) Gyamar Nikum	3	1	4
6	FW	33	(India) Muhammad Ajsal	2	1	3
6	MF	44	(India) Haobam Singh	2	1	3
8	FW	21	(Cape Verde) Gianni dos Santos	2	0	2
8	MF	22	(India) Jackichand Singh	2	0	2
10	MF	8	(India) Phijam Vikash Singh	1	0	1
10	FW	25	(India) Sumeet Passi	1	0	1
10	DF	26	(India) Deepak Devrani	1	0	1
Total				36	7	43
