= List of Inter Kashi FC managers =

Managers of football club

Inter Kashi FC (commonly referred to as Inter Kashi) is an Indian association football club based in Varanasi, Uttar Pradesh. Founded in 2023, it is one of the newest and stood itself as the fastest-growing football club in India. The club competes in Indian Super League, the top tier of Indian football league system

== List ==
Name	Nationality	From	To	Duration	Honours	No. of honours	Ref
Carlos Santamarina	Spain	7 July 2023	31 May 2024	329 days		0	
Antonio Habas	Spain	5 July 2024	Present	646 days	Champions 2024–25 I-League	1	
Arata Izumi	India	27 July 2024	31 August 2024	35 days		0	
Abhijit Mondal	India	26 October 2025	1 November 2025	7 days		0	
Deepak Deshwal	India	22 November 2025	22 November 2025	1 days		0	
