= Muhammad Ajsal =

Indian footballer (born 2003)

Personal information
- Date of birth: 28 March 2003 (age 23)
- Place of birth: Kozhikode, Kerala, India
- Height: 1.72 m (5 ft 8 in)
- Positions: Striker; winger

Team information
- Current team: Mumbai City
- Number: 22

Youth career
- MA Football Academy
- –2022: Kerala Blasters

Senior career*
Years	Team	Apps	(Gls)
2022–2026	Kerala Blasters	10	(1)
2023–2024	→ Inter Kashi (loan)	12	(3)
2024–2025	→ Gokulam Kerala (loan)	0	(0)
2025–2026	→ Calicut (loan)	11	(7)
2026–	Mumbai City	0	(0)

International career^{‡}
2026–	India U23	2	(1)
- * Club domestic league appearances and goals as of 17:20, 10 May 2026 (UTC) ‡ National team caps and goals as of 21:36, 28 March 2026 (UTC)

Muhammad Ajsal (born 28 March 2003) is an Indian professional footballer who plays as a forward for Indian Super League club Mumbai City.

== Club career ==
=== Club career ===
==== Kerala Blasters ====
Having joined Indian Super League club Kerala Blasters in 2022, Ajsal was included in the squad for the 2022 Durand Cup. On 19 August 2022, he made his debut for the club and scored his first goal in a 1–1 draw against Sudeva Delhi.

On 22 February 2026, Ajsal made his ISL debut in a 0–1 loss against Mumbai City FC. On 15 March 2026, he scored a 90+2 minute equalizer against East Bengal, earning the club's first point of the season.

==== Inter Kashi (loan) ====
On 17 August 2023, Blasters announced that Ajsal had been loaned to Inter Kashi on a season-long loan deal.

==== Gokulam Kerala (loan) ====
On 3 September 2024, Ajsal joined Gokulam Kerala on a season-long loan.

==== Calicut FC (loan) ====
On 10 September 2025, Ajsal signed for Super League Kerala club Calicut FC on a season-long loan. He socred seven goals in the 2025 Super League Kerala and awarded the Player of the Tournament.

=== Mumbai City FC ===
On 1 August 2026, fellow ISL side Mumbai City announced the arrival of Ajsal on a two-year contract.

=== International career ===
==== India Under-23 ====
On 22 March 2026, India U-23 head coach Naushad Moosa listed Ajsal in the 24-members squad for the 2026 Tri-Nation Series.

== Career statistics ==
=== Club ===
As of match played 14 March 2026

Appearances and goals by club, season and competition
Club	Season	League			National cup (Note: Includes AIFF Super Cup)		AFC		Other		Total	
Club	Season	Division	Apps	Goals	Apps	Goals	Apps	Goals	Apps	Goals	Apps	Goals
Kerala Blasters	2022–23	Indian Super League	0	0	—		—		5 (Note: Appearances in Durand Cup)	2	5	2
Kerala Blasters	2025–26	Indian Super League	4	1	0	0	—		—		4	1
Kerala Blasters	Total		4	1	0	0	—		5	2	9	3
Inter Kashi (loan)	2023–24	I-League	12	3	2	1	—		—		14	4
Calicut (loan)	2025	Super League Kerala	11	7	0	0	—		—		11	7
Career total			27	11	2	1	0	0	5	2	34	14

== Honours ==
Individual

- Super League Kerala Player of the Tournament: 2025
