= Tomba Singh Haobam =

Indian footballer (born 2003)

Tomba Singh
Personal information
- Full name: Tomba Singh Haobam
- Date of birth: 1 February 2004 (age 22)
- Place of birth: Manipur, India
- Height: 1.77 m (5 ft 10 in)
- Position: Defensive midfielder

Team information
- Current team: Goa
- Number: 8

Youth career
- 2020: Classic FA

Senior career*
Years	Team	Apps	(Gls)
2020–2021	East Bengal	4	(0)
2022–2023	Classic FA	3	(0)
2023–2026	Inter Kashi	45	(3)
2026–	Goa	2	(0)

International career
2026–	India U23	0	(0)
- * Club domestic league appearances and goals as of 28 October 2026

Tomba Singh Haobam (Meitei: Haobam Tomba Singh, born 17 February 2003) is an Indian professional footballer who plays as a midfielder for the Indian Super League club Goa.

== Career ==
Born in Manipur, Tomba began his career with East Bengal in the Indian Super League. He made his professional debut for Indian Super league side on 20 December 2020 against Kerala Blasters. He started and played 70 minutes as East Bengal drew the match 1–1.

=== Inter Kashi ===
On 16 September 2023, Tomba signed for I-League club Inter Kashi. He made his debut for the club on 28 October 2023 against Gokulam Kerala, which ended in a 2–2 draw. He came on as a substitute for Gyamar Nikum under head coach Carlos Santamarina.

On 6 November 2023, he scored his first goal for the club in a 4–2 away victory against Namdhari. During the 2023–24 season, Tomba established himself as a regular member of the squad, featuring consistently across competitions and scoring four goals.

In the following season, he made nine league appearances under head coach Antonio López Habas, featuring less frequently in the side.

After Inter Kashi's promotion to the Indian Super League, Habas deployed Tomba in a deeper midfield role. He began the campaign with an assist in a 1–1 draw against Goa, delivering a chipped through ball for the opening goal of the match. During the season, Habas praised Tomba's performances, describing him as the best Indian midfielder in the league.

=== Goa ===
On 22 July 2026, Tomba terminated his contract with Inter Kashi after the club defaulted on salary payments and joined Indian Super League club FC Goa. The move was approved by the AIFF under Article 17 of the Regulations on the Status and Transfer of Players, which allows a player to terminate their contract for just cause in cases of non-payment of wages.

== International career ==
=== India U23 ===
In March 2026, Tomba was named in the India U23 squad by head coach Naushad Moosa for the Tri-Nation friendly tournament held in Yupia, Arunachal Pradesh.

== Career statistics ==
=== Club ===
As of 21 May 2026

Club	Season	League			National Cup		League Cup		AFC		Total	
Club	Season	Division	Apps	Goals	Apps	Goals	Apps	Goals	Apps	Goals	Apps	Goals
East Bengal	2020–21	Indian Super League	4	0	–		–		–		4	0
Classic FA	2023	RFDL	3	0	–		–		–		3	0
Inter Kashi	2023–24	I-League	23	3	4 (Note: Appearance(s) in Super Cup)	1	–		–		27	4
Inter Kashi	2024–25	I-League	9	0	2	0	2 (Note: Appearance(s) in Durand Cup)	1	–		13	1
Inter Kashi	2025–26	Indian Super League	13	0	2	0	–		–		15	0
Inter Kashi	Total		45	3	8	1	2	1	0	0	55	5
FC Goa	2026–27	Indian Super League	0	0	–		–		–		0	0
Career total			52	3	8	1	2	1	0	0	62	5

== Honours ==
Inter Kashi

- I-League: 2024–25
