= Anil Chawan =

Indian footballer

Personal information
- Full name: Anil Chawan
- Date of birth: 27 April 1999 (age 27)
- Place of birth: Karnataka, India
- Height: 1.82 m (6 ft 0 in)
- Positions: Centre-back; right-back

Team information
- Current team: Inter Kashi
- Number: 27

Youth career
- 2012: Sporting Goa
- 2013: Dempo
- 2014–2017: Sesa FA youth
- 2017: Bardez

Senior career*
Years	Team	Apps	(Gls)
2017–2019	Sesa	12	(2)
2019–2020	ATK	0	(0)
2019–2020	→ ATK B (loan)	11	(0)
2020–2021	East Bengal	0	(0)
2021–2022	Rajasthan United	14	(1)
2023	Bengaluru United	12	(0)
2023–	Inter Kashi	8	(0)
- * Club domestic league appearances and goals as of 07:28, 20 March 2024 (UTC)

Anil Chawan, born 27 April 1999 is an Indian professional footballer who plays as a defender for I-League club Inter Kashi.

== Club career ==
=== Youth ===
Hailing from Karnataka, Chawan's professional career journey began in the neighbouring state of Goa, where the then fifteen-year-old was selected for Sesa Football Academy. As a defender, he was regarded as one of the bright talents from the Sesa Academy's batch by the coaches which soon led to his promotion to the Sesa's senior squad two years later.

=== Sesa ===
At the age of eighteen, Chawan was promoted to the senior side of Sesa which participated in the Goa First Division League, the second-tier league of Goa. He captained the Sesa's side in the 2018–19 season where he delivered a notable performance with two goals and five assists to his name over twelve games played, thus helping the team in promotion to Goa Professional League, the top-tier league of the state. In the league's campaign, Chawan also bagged three man of the match awards. The 2018–19 season with Sesa was noticed by the Indian Super League side ATK who signed him for the 2019–20 season, marking a leap in the Chawan's career.

=== ATK ===
On 24 July 2019, Chawan was signed by the then ISL side ATK for the 2019–20 season of club's campaign. Marking him as the only second player after Denzil Franco from Sesa to have ever signed for ATK. He was registered into the ATK squad led by Antonio Habas for the club's preseason and was on the bench for ATK's opening game against Kerala Blasters away at Kochi. He was then selected for ATK's Reserve side where he was handed over the captain's armband for I-League 2nd Disvision. He also played all three matches in the 2019 Durand Cup for ATK including the famous victory over one of the Kolkata giants, Mohammmedan SC. He made eleven appearances in total for the ATK Reserves side and was also part of the ATK senior squad that clinched the 2019–20 Indian Super League title.

=== East Bengal ===
After his stint at three-time champions ATK and their Reserve side, Chawan then signed for East Bengal and was announced to be part of the squad in 2020–21 season. Like the previous stint, Chawan in East Bengal lacked of any match time in the senior team and spent his time with reserves side. However, not much is known of his time at the club. In the next season he would then move to I-League side Rajasthan United.

=== Rajasthan United ===
Chawan signed for Rajasthan United in December 2021 as part of the club's winter signings in the 2021-22 I-League campaign. Chawan made fourteen appearances for the club and scored his first I-League goal that came in a winning encounter against Sreenidi Deccan.

=== Bengaluru United ===
Returning to his state in 2023, Chawan signed for Bengaluru United and captained the side four times in the club's I-League 2nd Division where the club went on to qualify for the final round but was unable to make a cut for the I-League promotion.

=== Inter Kashi ===
Although Chawan was unable to taste the success of I-League promotion with Bengaluru United, he was then signed by Inter Kashi which enabled him to return to the league after a season's gap. Chawan has made eleven appearances so far for the Varanasi-based club in the ongoing season of I-League.
