= Nikola Stojanović =

Nikola Stojanović may refer to:

- Nikola Stojanović (politician, born 1880), a Serbian writer and politician (died 1964)
- Nikola Stojanović (politician, born 1933), a Serbian communist who served as the Secretary of the Presidency of the League of Communists of Yugoslavia (died 2020)
- Nikola Stojanović (film director) (1942–2021), a Serbian director
- Nikola Stojanović (footballer, born 1983), Macedonian football defender
- Nikola Stojanović (footballer, born 1995), Serbian football midfielder and forward
