= Mario Barco =

Spanish footballer (born 1992)

Personal information
- Full name: Mario Barco Vilar
- Date of birth: 23 December 1992 (age 33)
- Place of birth: Calahorra, Spain
- Height: 1.83 m (6 ft 0 in)
- Position: Striker

Youth career
- –2006: Peña Sport
- 2006–2007: Athletic Bilbao
- 2007–2011: Calahorra

Senior career*
Years	Team	Apps	(Gls)
2011–2012	Calahorra	30	(20)
2012–2013	Logroñés	33	(9)
2013–2015	Bilbao Athletic	43	(5)
2015	Barakaldo	13	(6)
2015–2018	Lugo	23	(5)
2015–2016	→ Somozas (loan)	33	(8)
2016–2017	→ Pontevedra (loan)	25	(12)
2018–2019	Cádiz	8	(0)
2019–2021	Mirandés	30	(3)
2021–2022	Castellón	31	(8)
2022–2023	Numancia	23	(0)
2023–2026	Inter Kashi	29	(16)
- * Club domestic league appearances and goals as of 10:21,14 February 2026 (UTC)

Mario Barco Vilar (born 23 December 1992) is a Spanish professional footballer who plays as a striker.

== Club career ==
Born in Estella-Lizarra, Navarre, Barco finished his formation with CD Calahorra, after representing Peña Sport FC and Athletic Bilbao. He made his senior debuts with the former in the 2011–12 campaign, scoring 20 goals in Tercera División.

In August 2012 Barco signed for UD Logroñés in Segunda División B, after impressing in a trial basis. On 10 July of the following year he returned to the Lions, being assigned to the reserves also in the third level.

On 28 January 2015 Barco rescinded his contract, and moved to fellow league team Barakaldo CF hours later. On 5 July he signed a three-year deal with CD Lugo in Segunda División, but was loaned to UD Somozas on 10 August.

On 8 August 2016 Barco joined Pontevedra CF in the third tier, also in a temporary deal. He scored 12 goals for the club during the campaign, but missed the play-offs due to injury.

Barco made his professional debut on 12 October 2017, coming on as a substitute for Francisco Fydriszewski and scoring the last in a 2–0 home win against Córdoba CF. The following 25 June, he signed a three-year contract with Cádiz CF also in the second division.

On 23 July 2019, after being rarely used, Barco terminated his contract with the Andalusians, and joined fellow second division side CD Mirandés on a two-year deal the following day. After two years used mainly as a substitute, he moved to Primera División RFEF side CD Castellón on 21 July 2021.

On 8 September 2023, Barco signed for newly formed I-League club Inter Kashi.

== Career statistics ==
As of match played 14 February 2026

Appearances and goals by club, season and competition
Club	Season	League			Cup (Note: Includes Copa del Rey, Super Cup, Durand Cup)		Total	
Club	Season	Division	Apps	Goals	Apps	Goals	Apps	Goals
Calahorra	2011–12	Tercera División	30	20	—		30	20
Logroñés	2012–13	Segunda División B	33	9	1	0	34	9
Bilbao Athletic	2013–14	Segunda División B	32	5	—		32	5
Bilbao Athletic	2014–15	Segunda División B	11	0	—		11	0
Bilbao Athletic	Total		43	5	0	0	43	5
Barakaldo	2014–15	Segunda División B	13	6	—		13	6
Lugo	2017–18	Segunda División	23	5	—		23	5
Somozas (loan)	2015–16	Segunda División B	33	8	—		33	8
Pontevedra (loan)	2016–17	Segunda División B	25	12	—		25	12
Cádiz	2018–19	Segunda División	8	0	1	0	9	0
Mirandés	2019–20	Segunda División	17	3	2	0	19	3
Mirandés	2020–21	Segunda División	13	0	—		13	0
Mirandés	Total		30	3	2	0	32	3
Castellón	2021–22	Primera División RFEF	31	8	0	0	31	8
Numanica	2022–23	Primera Federación	23	0	—		23	0
Inter Kashi	2023–24	I-League	20	12	4	2	24	14
Inter Kashi	2024–25	I-League	9	4	5	0	14	4
Inter Kashi	Total		29	16	9	2	38	18
Career total			321	92	13	2	334	94
