= Ashray Bhardwaj =

Indian footballer (born 2001)

Personal information
- Date of birth: 12 January 2001 (age 25)
- Place of birth: Chandigarh, India
- Height: 1.84 m (6 ft 0 in)
- Position: Centre-back

Youth career
- Chandigarh State Team
- RoundGlass Sports

Senior career*
| Years | Team | Apps | (Gls) |
| –2020 | Punjab B | 2 | (0) |
| 2020–2022 | Punjab | 3 | (0) |
| 2022 | Young Boys | | |
| 2022–2023 | Sudeva Delhi | 4 | (0) |
| 2023–2024 | Bengaluru United | 0 | (0) |
| 2024 | Sudeva Delhi | 14 | (4) |
| 2024–2026 | Inter Kashi | 2 | (0) |
- * Club domestic league appearances and goals as of 10:21, 17 May 2026 (UTC)

Ashray Bhardwaj (born 12 January 2001) is an Indian professional footballer who plays as a centre-back.

== Career ==
Born in Chandigarh, Ashray started his professional football career with Round Glass Sports and Chandigarh State Team. On 29 November 2020, Ashray was promoted to senior team of Punjab FC. Ashray made his professional debut for club in I-League on 9 January 2020.

== Style of play ==
Ashray Bharadwaj has been a reliable presence at the back, keeping the opponents at bay and containing any potential threats.

== Career statistics ==
=== Club ===
As of 30 January 2024

| Club | Season | League | | | Cup | | AFC | | Total | |
| Club | Season | Division | Apps | Goals | Apps | Goals | Apps | Goals | Apps | Goals |
|---|---|---|---|---|---|---|---|---|---|---|
| RoundGlass; Punjab B | 2019–20 | I-League 2 | 2 | 0 | 0 | 0 | — | | 2 | 0 |
| RoundGlass; Punjab | 2020–21 | I-League | 3 | 0 | 0 | 0 | — | | 3 | 0 |
| Sudeva Delhi | 2022–23 | I-League | 4 | 0 | 1 (Note: Appearance(s) in Durand Cup) | 0 | — | | 5 | 0 |
| Sudeva Delhi | 2023–24 | I-League 2 | 2 | 1 | — | | — | | 2 | 1 |
| Career total | | | 11 | 1 | 1 | 0 | 0 | 0 | 12 | 1 |
