= Ekana Football Stadium =

Association football stadium in Lucknow, Uttar Pradesh, India

Ekana International Football Stadium
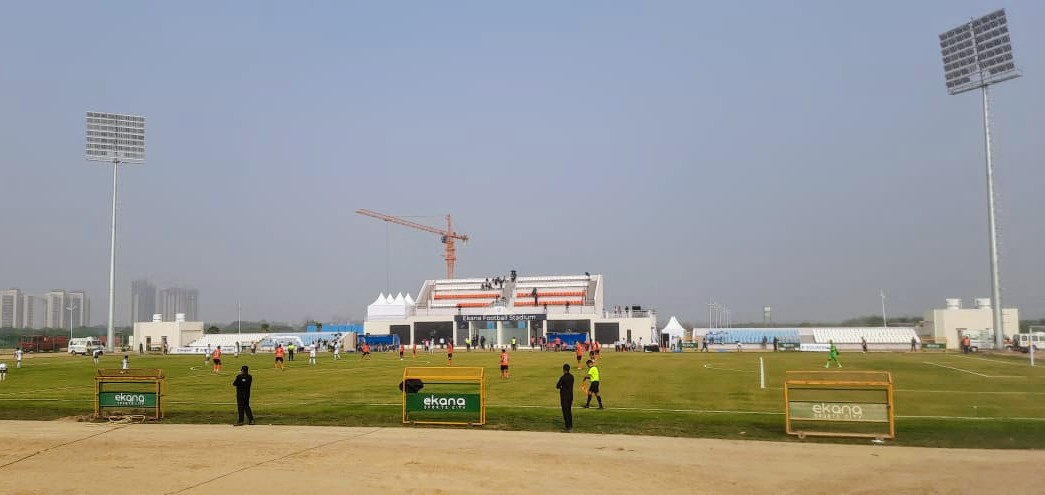
- Ground view of the stadium
- Interactive map of Ekana International Football Stadium
- Address: Ekana Sports City, Gomti Nagar Extension; Lucknow; India
- Location: Lucknow, Uttar Pradesh
- Coordinates: 26.8131°N 81.0201°E
- Owner: Ekana Sports City
- Operator: Ekana Sports City
- Capacity: 2,000
- Surface: Grass

Tenant
- Lucknow Super Division

Website
- https://ekana.com/stadiums

Ekana International Football Stadium is a football stadium in Lucknow, Uttar Pradesh. The stadium is built as per FIFA and AIFF standards.

== History ==
This facility hosts a range of cultural and entertainment events. On 21 November 2023, Inter Kashi played their first I-League home match against Mohammedan SC at the stadium.

== Facilities ==
A new football stadium was constructed next to Bharat Ratna Shri Atal Bihari Vajpayee Ekana Cricket Stadium in Ekana Sports City Lucknow. The stadium facilities matches all international football standards.

This stadium provides youth of Lucknow with good opportunities in football also people in and around Lucknow can watch football matches in international level dedicated football stadium.
