= Arindam Bhattacharya (footballer) =

Indian footballer

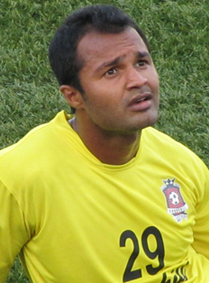
- Bhattacharya with Churchill Brothers in 2011

Personal information
- Date of birth: 11 December 1989 (age 36)
- Place of birth: Kolkata, India
- Height: 1.90 m (6 ft 3 in)
- Position: Goalkeeper

Team information
- Current team: Inter Kashi
- Number: 29

Youth career
- 2004–2006: Tata Football Academy

Senior career*
Years	Team	Apps	(Gls)
2011–2012	Churchill Brothers	22	(0)
2012–2013	Mohun Bagan	34	(0)
2013–2014	Churchill Brothers	88	(0)
2014–2017	Pune City	16	(0)
2015	→ Bharat (loan)	17	(0)
2015-2016	→ Sporting Goa (loan)	22	(0)
2016-2017	→ Bengaluru (loan)	24	(0)
2017–2018	Mumbai City	32	(0)
2018–2020	ATK	38	(0)
2020–2021	Mohun Bagan	26	(0)
2021–2022	East Bengal	24	(0)
2022–2023	NorthEast United	28	(0)
2023–2026	Inter Kashi	42	(0)
2009–2014	India	6	(0)
- * Club domestic league appearances and goals as of 21:34, 8 April 2024 (UTC)

Arindam Bhattacharya (Bengali: অরিন্দম ভট্টাচার্য; born 11 December 1989) is an Indian professional footballer who plays as a goalkeeper for Indian Super League club Inter Kashi.

== Club career ==
Bhattacharya played football for Surya Sen Sporting Club in Khardah, he then joined SAI senior team in 2006 where he stayed for 2 years before joining Churchill Brothers.

Bhattacharya joined the Tata Football Academy and was selected for the India under-19 after his performance in the Subroto Cup. After a short spell with the Sports Authority of India, Bhattacharya joined Churchill Brothers, with whom he won the Hero I-League in 2008-09. He moved to Mohun Bagan in the 2012–13 season only to return to Churchill Brothers and win the Federation Cup in 2014. Bhattacharya then joined FC Pune City from 2014 to 2017 before switching to Mumbai City for the 2017–18 season. Bhattacharya made his debut for FC Pune City against Kerala Blasters on 30 October 2014 at the home stadium Shree Shiv Chhatrapati Sports Complex in Pune.

For the 2015 I-League season, he joined Bharat FC. In 2018 Bhattacharya joined Kolkata based club and two time Indian Super League winners ATK. and immediately established himself as the first choice goalkeeper, playing every game that season. In 2020, Arindam Bhattacharya kept 10 clean sheets and was awarded the Golden Gloves. In October 2020, Bhattacharya extended his contract with ATK Mohun Bagan till 2022.

In September 2021, after mutually terminating the contract with ATK Mohun Bagan, Arindam joined East Bengal on a free transfer.

In late June 2022, it was officially announced that Bhattacharya will head to Spain for a month-long training stint with Tercera División (Group 9) side Marbella FC, as part of his preparations ahead of the 2022–23 Indian Super League.

On 23 August 2022, Arindam joined NorthEast United on a free transfer.

== International career ==
Seeing his performance in Subroto Cup, Stephen Constantine called Bhattacharya up for the Indian U-19 team. His first matches where against Sri Lanka and Myanmar. He made his debut for India U23 team on 5 December 2009 against Afghanistan in Dhaka in the 2009 SAFF Championship.

== Personal life ==
On 13 April 2021, Arindam joined the Bharatiya Janata Party in the presence of Union ministers Amit Malviya and Mithun Chakraborty.

On 30 April 2022, he married his long-time girlfriend Blossom Themudo, a Goan dentist.

== Career statistics ==
=== Club ===
As of 1 June 2025

Club	Season	League			Cup (Note: Includes Federation Cup, Durand Cup and Super Cup)		Continental (Note: Includes AFC Champions League and AFC Cup)		Other		Total	
Club	Season	Division	Apps	Goals	Apps	Goals	Apps	Goals	Apps	Goals	Apps	Goals
Churchill Brothers	2008–09	I-League	22	0	0	0	—		1 (Note: Appearance in Indian Super Cup)	0	23	0
Churchill Brothers	2009–10	I-League	0	0	0	0	6	0	0	0	6	0
Churchill Brothers	2010–11	I-League	0	0	0	0	—		0	0	0	0
Churchill Brothers	2011–12	I-League	0	0	0	0	—		0	0	0	0
Churchill Brothers	2013–14	I-League	12	0	0	0	2 (Note: Appearance(s) in AFC Cup)	0	6 (Note: Appearances in Goa Professional League)	0	20	0
Churchill Brothers	Churchill Brothers Total		34	0	0	0	8	0	7	0	49	0
Mohun Bagan	2012–13	I-League	7	0	2	0	—		9 (Note: 7 Appearances in Calcutta Football League and 2 Appearances in IFA Shield)	0	18	0
Mohun Bagan	2020–21	Indian Super League	23	0	0	0	—		—		23	0
Mohun Bagan	Mohun Bagan Total		30	0	2	0	0	0	9	0	41	0
Pune City	2014	Indian Super League	11	0	0	0	—		—		11	0
Pune City	2015	Indian Super League	4	0	0	0	—		—		4	0
Pune City	2016	Indian Super League	1	0	0	0	—		—		1	0
Pune City	Pune City Total		16	0	0	0	0	0	0	0	16	0
Bharat (loan)	2014–15	I-League	17	0	0	0	—		—		17	0
Bharat (loan)	Bharat FC Total		17	0	0	0	0	0	0	0	17	0
Sporting Goa (loan)	2015–16	I-League	16	0	0	0	—		—		16	0
Sporting Goa (loan)	Sporting Club de Goa Total		16	0	0	0	0	0	0	0	16	0
Bengaluru (loan)	2016–17	I-League	6	0	0	0	1	0	—		7	0
Bengaluru (loan)	Bengaluru FC Total		6	0	0	0	1	0	0	0	7	0
Mumbai City	2017–18	Indian Super League	2	0	0	0	—		—		2	0
Mumbai City	Mumbai City FC Total		2	0	0	0	0	0	0	0	2	0
ATK	2018–19	Indian Super League	18	0	0	0	—		—		18	0
ATK	2019–20	Indian Super League	20	0	0	0	—		—		20	0
ATK	ATK Total		38	0	0	0	0	0	0	0	38	0
East Bengal	2021–22	Indian Super League	11	0	0	0	—		—		11	0
East Bengal	East Bengal Total		11	0	0	0	0	0	0	0	11	0
NorthEast United	2022–23	Indian Super League	10	0	0	0	—		—		10	0
NorthEast United	North East Total		10	0	0	0	0	0	0	0	10	0
Inter Kashi	2023–24	I-League	21	0	3	0	—		—		24	0
Inter Kashi	2024–25	I-League	21	0	—		—		—		21	0
Inter Kashi	Kashi Total		42	0	3	0	0	0	0	0	45	0
Career total			222	0	5	0	9	0	16	0	251	0

== Honours ==
India U23

- SAFF Championship: 2009
