= Joni Kauko =

Finnish footballer (born 1990)

Personal information
- Full name: Joni Ensio Kauko
- Date of birth: 12 July 1990 (age 36)
- Place of birth: Turku, Finland
- Height: 1.86 m (6 ft 1 in)
- Position: Midfielder

Team information
- Current team: SalPa
- Number: 18

Youth career
- 1995–2001: Runosmäen Nappulat
- 2002–2005: TPS
- 2006–2009: Inter Turku

Senior career*
Years	Team	Apps	(Gls)
2008–2012	Inter Turku	98	(10)
2013	Lahti	9	(0)
2013–2015	FSV Frankfurt	48	(3)
2015–2016	Energie Cottbus	34	(4)
2016–2018	Randers	51	(3)
2018–2021	Esbjerg	91	(22)
2021–2024	Mohun Bagan	40	(6)
2024–2025	Inter Kashi	18	(3)
2025–2026	KTP	9	(0)
2026	Mumbai City	13	(0)
2026–	SalPa	6	(2)

International career
2006	Finland U16	5	(0)
2007–2008	Finland U18	11	(0)
2009	Finland U19	4	(0)
2009–2012	Finland U21	23	(3)
2012–2021	Finland	28	(0)
Medal record
Men's football
Representing Finland
Third place	Baltic Cup	2014
- * Club domestic league appearances and goals as of 7 November 2026

Joni Ensio Kauko (born 12 July 1990) is a Finnish professional footballer who plays as a midfielder for Ykkönen club SalPa.

Kauko made his international debut for Finland in January 2012, at the age of 21. He was a regular member of the team that won League C group 2 in 2018–19 UEFA Nations League.

== Club career ==
=== Finland ===
==== Inter Turku ====
A product of local Inter Turku's youth system, Kauko signed his professional contract on 27 November 2007 at the age of 17. He made his Veikkausliiga debut six months later on 26 June 2008 against IFK Mariehamn. During his first season with the Turku-based club, he made only eight appearances, but helped his team to win the Finnish championship. He scored his first senior goal for Inter on 3 May 2009 against MYPA.

==== Lahti ====
After representing Inter for five seasons, Kauko declined a contract extension after the 2012 season and he signed with FC Lahti for one season.

=== Germany ===
==== FSV Frankfurt ====
Six months after signing with Lahti, it was announced that Kauko had signed a two-year contract with an option to a third, with German 2. Bundesliga side FSV Frankfurt.

==== Energie Cottbus ====
Upon expiry of his contract with FSV Frankfurt Kauko signed a two-year contract with German 3. Liga side FC Energie Cottbus.

=== Denmark ===
==== Randers ====
In July 2016, Kauko signed a two-year contract with Danish Superliga club Randers.

==== Esbjerg ====
Two years later, on 28 June 2018, Kauko signed a contract with Esbjerg fB ahead of the 2018–19 Danish Superliga season.

=== Mohun Bagan ===
On 24 June 2021, Kauko joined Indian Super League club Mohun Bagan on a two-year deal. He was included in the twenty-two men squad by head coach Antonio Lopez Habas for the team's 2021 AFC Cup inter-zonal semifinal match against Uzbek side Nasaf, but they lost 6–0 and were eliminated from the tournament, in which he made his debut for the club.

On 19 November, Kauko made his Indian Super League debut against Kerala Blasters, in a 4–2 win. He scored his first goal for the club against NorthEast United, on 12 February, in a 3–1 win. He ended the league season with three goals in twenty appearances, as Mohun Bagan finished third in the standings and were eliminated in the semi-final playoffs.

Kauko scored a brace each against Blue Star, on 12 April, and against Maziya S&RC on 24 May in AFC Cup Preliminary round and Group stage respectively. As 2022–23 season began, he appeared with the club on 20 August against Rajasthan United at the 131st edition of Durand Cup, but lost the match by 3–2. Kauko suffered a serious knee injury in the match against FC Goa on 20 November 2022 at the Jawaharlal Nehru Stadium in Margao and was brought off the field in the 59th minute of the match as the Mohun Bagan lost the match 0–3.

After being out for nearly 16 months due to injury, Kauko rejoined Mohun Bagan, replacing Hugo Boumous in the squad for the second half of the 2023–24 season. He returned to the pitch as a 61st-minute substitute in a 2–0 home win against Hyderabad FC. On 17 February 2024, Kauko provided a hat-trick of assists in a 4–2 home win over NorthEast United. On 31 March 2024, Kauko scored his first goal after the injury, in a 3–2 loss against Chennaiyin.

=== Inter Kashi ===
For the 2024–25 season, Kauko signed with Indian I-League club Inter Kashi. Kauko made his official debut for his new club on 22 November, as a starter in a 1–0 home victory over SC Bengaluru. He scored his first goal for Inter Kashi on 20 December, in a 3–1 home win over Sreenidi Deccan.

=== Mumbai City ===
After a short stint at KTP in Finland, Kauko returned to India to sign for Mumbai City on a contract until the end of the 2026 season. Following the expiry of his contract, Kauko left the club.

=== SalPa ===
After leaving Mumbai City, Kauko returned to Finnish league system, joining Ykkösliiga club SalPa on a contract until the end of the 2027 season.

== International career ==
Kauko was a regular member for the Finland's U21 during 2009–2012, making in total of 23 appearances and scoring three goals. He has also served as a captain for the Finland U-21 team.

He made his senior debut on 22 January 2012, in a friendly against Trinidad and Tobago. During Finland's qualification campaign for the UEFA Euro 2016 he was a member of the team in 8 matches but remained as an unused substitute. In 2018–19 UEFA Nations League he gained four caps and was in the starting line up on 15 November 2018 in a match against Greece.

Kauko was called up for the UEFA Euro 2020 pre-tournament friendly match against Sweden on 29 May 2021.

== Career statistics ==
=== Club ===
As of 26 October 2025

Appearances and goals by club, season and competition
Club	Season	Division	League		Cup (Note: Includes Suomen Cup, DFB-Pokal, Danish Cup and Durand Cup.)		League cup (Note: Includes Finnish League Cup and Brandenburg Cup.)		Continental		Total	
Club	Season	Division	Apps	Goals	Apps	Goals	Apps	Goals	Apps	Goals	Apps	Goals
Sinimustat	2008	Kakkonen	16	7	–		–		–		16	7
Inter Turku	2008	Veikkausliiga	8	0	0	0	–		–		8	0
Inter Turku	2009	Veikkausliiga	19	3	4	1	6	0	2 (Note: Appearance(s) in UEFA Champions League)	0	31	4
Inter Turku	2010	Veikkausliiga	16	0	0	0	7	0	2 (Note: Appearance(s) in UEFA Europa League)	0	25	0
Inter Turku	2011	Veikkausliiga	31	3	0	0	6	1	–		37	4
Inter Turku	2012	Veikkausliiga	24	4	0	0	6	1	2	0	32	5
Inter Turku	Total		98	10	4	1	25	2	6	0	133	13
FC Lahti	2013	Veikkausliiga	9	0	1	0	7	0	–		17	0
FSV Frankfurt	2013–14	2. Bundesliga	27	0	2	0	–		–		29	0
FSV Frankfurt	2014–15	2. Bundesliga	21	3	1	0	–		–		22	3
FSV Frankfurt	Total		48	3	3	0	0	0	0	0	51	3
Energie Cottbus	2015–16	3. Liga	34	4	1	0	2	1	–		37	5
Randers	2016–17	Danish Superliga	22	1	0	0	–		–		22	1
Randers	2017–18	Danish Superliga	29	2	1	0	–		–		30	2
Randers	Total		51	3	1	0	0	0	0	0	52	3
Esbjerg	2018–19	Danish Superliga	35	8	2	1	–		–		37	9
Esbjerg	2019–20	Danish Superliga	30	6	2	1	–		2	0	34	7
Esbjerg	2020–21	Danish 1st Division	26	8	0	0	–		–		26	8
Esbjerg	Total		91	22	4	2	0	0	2	0	97	24
Mohun Bagan	2021–22	Indian Super League	20	3	0	0	–		6 (Note: Appearance(s) in AFC Cup)	4	26	7
Mohun Bagan	2022–23	Indian Super League	6	2	3	0	–		1	0	10	2
Mohun Bagan	2023–24	Indian Super League	14	1	0	0	–		0	0	14	1
Mohun Bagan	Total		40	6	3	0	0	0	7	4	50	10
Inter Kashi	2024–25	I-League	18	3	0	0	–		–		18	3
KTP	2025	Veikkausliiga	9	0	0	0	–		–		9	0
Mumbai City	2025–26	Indian Super League	0	0	0	0	–		–		0	0
Career total			414	58	17	3	34	3	15	4	480	68

=== International ===
As of 21 June 2021

National team	Year	Competitive		Friendly		Total	
National team	Year	Apps	Goals	Apps	Goals	Apps	Goals
Finland	2012	0	0	1	0	1	0
Finland	2013	0	0	2	0	2	0
Finland	2014	0	0	2	0	2	0
Finland	2015	0	0	1	0	1	0
Finland	2016	0	0	1	0	1	0
Finland	2017	0	0	2	0	2	0
Finland	2018	4	0	0	0	4	0
Finland	2019	5	0	0	0	5	0
Finland	2020	2	0	2	0	4	0
Finland	2021	5	0	1	0	6	0
Total		16	0	12	0	28	0

== Honours ==
Inter Turku

- Finnish League Cup: 2008
- Veikkausliiga: 2008
- Finnish Cup: 2009

FC Lahti

- Finnish League Cup: 2013

Mohun Bagan

- Indian Super League Cup: 2022–23; runner-up: 2023–24
- Indian Super League Shield: 2023–24

Inter Kashi

- I-League: 2024–25

Finland

- Baltic Cup third-place: 2014
- UEFA Nations League: 2018-19 League C Winner
