= Nauris Petkevičius =

Lithuanian footballer (born 2000)

Personal information
- Date of birth: 19 February 2000 (age 26)
- Place of birth: Kaunas, Lithuania
- Height: 1.82 m (6 ft 0 in)
- Position: Forward

Team information
- Current team: FK Panevėžys
- Number: 24

Senior career*
Years	Team	Apps	(Gls)
2016–2017	Stumbras	13	(0)
2017–2020	Lille B	0	(0)
2020–2021	Hegelmann	41	(17)
2022–2023	Charleroi	4	(0)
2022–2023	Zébra Élites	4	(0)
2022–2023	→ Beerschot (loan)	3	(0)
2023	→ Žalgiris (loan)	9	(0)
2023	Hegelmann	15	(1)
2024	FA Šiauliai	20	(3)
2025–2026	FK Sūduva	35	(8)
2026	Inter Kashi	11	(1)
2026–	Panevėžys	10	(0)

International career^{‡}
2018	Lithuania U19	1	(0)
2020–2022	Lithuania U21	10	(1)
2022–	Lithuania	3	(0)
- * Club domestic league appearances and goals as of 8 September 2026 (UTC) ‡ National team caps and goals as of 17:55, 9 October 2025 (UTC)

Nauris Petkevičius (born 19 February 2000) is a Lithuanian professional footballer who plays as a forward for TOPLYGA club Panevėžys Club and the Lithuania national team.

== Career ==
In 2017, Petkevičius signed for the reserves of French Ligue 1 side Lille after trialing for the youth academy of Brentford in the English second tier. In 2020, he signed for Lithuanian second-tier club Hegelmann, helping them earn promotion to the Lithuanian top flight. Before the second half of 2021–11, he signed for Charleroi in the Belgian top flight. On 22 January 2022, Petkevičius debuted for Charleroi during a 0–0 draw with AA Gent.

On 3 February 2023, Petkevičius was loaned to Žalgiris.

On 6 July 2023, Petkevičius returned to Hegelmann.

On 16 December 2023 he signed with FA Šiauliai.

On 15 January 2025 he signed with Sūduva Club.

=== Inter Kashi ===
On 28 January 2026, he signed for Indian Super League club Inter Kashi. He made his league debut against Goa on 14 February 2026. He scored his first goal for the club against Kerala Blasters on 28 February, and also recorded his first assist for the club in the same match, assisting Alfred Planas' second half goal.
