= Sarthak Golui =

Indian footballer

Personal information
- Date of birth: 3 November 1997 (age 29)
- Place of birth: Kolkata, West Bengal, India
- Height: 1.83 m (6 ft 0 in)
- Positions: Right-back; centre-back

Team information
- Current team: Gokulam Kerala

Youth career
- AIFF Elite Academy

Senior career*
Years	Team	Apps	(Gls)
2015–2017	Mohun Bagan	2	(0)
2017–2019	Pune City	27	(1)
2019–2021	Mumbai City	17	(1)
2021	East Bengal	5	(1)
2021–2022	Bengaluru	3	(0)
2022–2024	East Bengal	13	(1)
2023–2024	→ Chennaiyin (loan)	10	(0)
2024–2025	Inter Kashi	20	(0)
2025–2026	Jamshedpur	0	(0)
2026–	Gokulam Kerala	0	(0)

International career^{‡}
2011–2013	India U16		
2014	India U19	6	(1)
2018–2019	India	4	(0)
- * Club domestic league appearances and goals as of 21:45, 6 April 2025 (UTC) ‡ National team caps and goals as of 21:10, 19 November 2019 (UTC)

Sarthak Golui (Bengali: সার্থক গোলুই; born 3 November 1997) is an Indian professional footballer who plays as a defender for Indian Football League club Gokulam Kerala.

== Club career ==
=== Early career and Mohun Bagan ===
Born in Kolkata, West Bengal, Golui was a part of the AIFF Elite Academy before trialing with I-League side, Mohun Bagan. On 9 January 2016, Golui made his professional debut with Mohun Bagan in the opening game of the I-League season against Aizawl. He came on in the last minute for Kean Lewis as Mohun Bagan won 3–1.

== International career ==
Golui has represented India at both the under-16 and under-19 level. He played AFC cup qualifying round 2017 against Maldives club.

== Personal life ==
Golui's father, Deb Kumar, was a former football player.

== Career statistics ==
=== Club ===
As of 6 April 2025

Club	Season	League			Cup		AFC		Total	
Club	Season	Division	Apps	Goals	Apps	Goals	Apps	Goals	Apps	Goals
Mohun Bagan	2015–16	I-League	2	0	0	0	–		2	0
Mohun Bagan	2016–17	I-League	0	0	0	0	3 (Note: Appearance(s) in AFC Cup)	0	3	0
Mohun Bagan	Total		2	0	0	0	3	0	5	0
Pune City	2017–18	Indian Super League	15	1	1 (Note: Appearance(s) in Super Cup)	0	–		16	1
Pune City	2018–19	Indian Super League	12	0	1	0	–		13	0
Pune City	Total		27	1	2	0	0	0	29	1
Mumbai City	2019–20	Indian Super League	13	1	0	0	–		13	1
Mumbai City	2020–21	Indian Super League	4	0	0	0	–		4	0
Mumbai City	Total		17	1	0	0	0	0	17	1
East Bengal	2020–21	Indian Super League	5	1	0	0	–		5	1
Bengaluru	2021–22	Indian Super League	3	0	0	0	4	0	7	0
East Bengal	2022–23	Indian Super League	13	1	4 (Note: Appearance(s) in Durand Cup)	0	–		17	1
Chennaiyin (loan)	2023–24	Indian Super League	10	0	2	0	–		12	0
Inter Kashi	2024–25	I-League	20	0	2	0	–		22	0
Jamshedpur	2025–26	Indian Super League	0	0	0	0	–		0	0
Career total			97	4	10	0	7	0	114	4

== Honours ==
India

- SAFF Championship runner-up: 2018
