= Sandip Mandi =

Indian footballer

Personal information
- Date of birth: 11 June 2002 (age 24)
- Place of birth: Kalyani, West Bengal, India
- Height: 1.76 m (5 ft 9 in)
- Position: Left-back

Team information
- Current team: East Bengal
- Number: 16

Youth career
- DSK Shivajians
- 2018–2020: Tata Football Academy

Senior career*
| Years | Team | Apps | (Gls) |
| 2020–2023 | Jamshedpur B | 9 | (0) |
| 2020–2023 | Jamshedpur | 12 | (0) |
| 2023 | Mohammedan | 10 | (0) |
| 2023–2026 | Inter Kashi | 34 | (0) |
| 2026– | East Bengal | 0 | (0) |

International career^{‡}
| 2018 | India U17 | 2 | (0) |
| 2024 | India U23 | 2 | (0) |
| 2026 | India | 0 | (0) |
- * Club domestic league appearances and goals as of 15:04, 22 March 2026 (UTC) ‡ National team caps and goals as of 17 November 2026 (UTC)

Sandip Mandi (born 11 June 2002) is an Indian professional footballer who plays as a defender for Indian Super League club East Bengal.

== Career ==
Mandi started his journey in Kalyani Municipal Football Academy. He represented the Bengal junior team. His impressive performance earned him a call-up to the India U-14 training camp. He subsequently secured a place in the India U-16 team. In 2018, he was selected to join the Tata Football Academy. Mandi made his senior debut for Jamshedpur at the age of 17 in February 2020 against ATK.

== Career statistics ==
=== Club ===
As of 8 April 2024

| Club | Season | League | | | Cup | | AFC | | Total | |
| Club | Season | Division | Apps | Goals | Apps | Goals | Apps | Goals | Apps | Goals |
|---|---|---|---|---|---|---|---|---|---|---|
| Jamshedpur | 2019–20 | Indian Super League | 3 | 0 | 1 (Note: Appearance(s) in Durand Cup) | 0 | — | | 4 | 0 |
| Jamshedpur | 2020–21 | Indian Super League | 4 | 0 | 0 | 0 | — | | 4 | 0 |
| Jamshedpur | 2021–22 | Indian Super League | 5 | 0 | 3 | 0 | — | | 8 | 0 |
| Jamshedpur | 2022–23 | Indian Super League | 0 | 0 | 4 | 0 | — | | 4 | 0 |
| Jamshedpur | Total | | 12 | 0 | 8 | 0 | 0 | 0 | 20 | 0 |
| Jamshedpur B | 2019–20 | I-League 2nd Division | 4 | 0 | — | | — | | 4 | 0 |
| Jamshedpur B | 2022 | RF Development League | 5 | 0 | — | | — | | 5 | 0 |
| Jamshedpur B | Total | | 9 | 0 | 0 | 0 | 0 | 0 | 9 | 0 |
| Mohammedan | 2022–23 | I-League | 10 | 0 | 1 (Note: Appearance(s) in Super Cup) | 0 | — | | 11 | 0 |
| Inter Kashi | 2023–24 | I-League | 17 | 0 | 4 | 0 | — | | 21 | 0 |
| Career total | | | 48 | 0 | 13 | 0 | 0 | 0 | 61 | 0 |

== Honours ==
India

- SAFF Championship: 2026
