= Sumeet Passi =

Indian footballer (born 1994)

Personal information
- Full name: Sumeet Jai Passi
- Date of birth: 12 September 1994 (age 32)
- Place of birth: Yamuna Nagar, Haryana, India
- Height: 1.79 m (5 ft 10 in)
- Position: Forward

Team information
- Current team: Inter Kashi
- Number: 25

Youth career
- Chandigarh FA
- Chandigarh U15

Senior career*
Years	Team	Apps	(Gls)
2013	Indian Arrows	3	(0)
2015–2016	Sporting Goa	9	(3)
2016	Northeast United	4	(0)
2017	→ DSK Shivajians (loan)	6	(0)
2018–2020	Jamshedpur	28	(3)
2021–2022	Punjab	22	(2)
2022–2023	East Bengal	11	(0)
2023–	Inter Kashi	55	(3)

International career^{‡}
2011–2012	India U19	1	(1)
2015	India U23	1	(0)
2016–2019	India	9	(4)
- * Club domestic league appearances and goals as of 21:44, 21 May 2026 (UTC) ‡ National team caps and goals as of 7 January 2020

Sumeet Jai Passi (born 12 September 1994) is an Indian professional footballer who plays as a forward for Inter Kashi.

== Club career ==
=== Early career ===
Passi began playing the game at a very young age and thanks his father, Jai Prakash Passi who is a former Railways player, as the man who motivated him to become a dedicated footballer. Passi then began his footballing career as a training with Chandigarh Football Academy. In 2007 it was announced that Passi would be the captain of the Chandigarh football team at the under-14s level for the 53rd National School Games.

=== Senior career ===
Passi made his professional debut in football on 2 February 2013 against East Bengal in which he came on in the 77th minute for Dhanpal Ganesh as Pailan Arrows lost the match 2–1.

=== Jamshedpur ===
On 23 July 2017, Passi was selected in the 12th round of the 2017–18 ISL Players Draft by Jamshedpur for the 2017–18 Indian Super League. He made his debut for the club on 18 February 2018 against Chennaiyin. He started the match and played 90 minutes as Jamshedpur drew 1–1.

=== East Bengal ===
In August 2022, Indian Super League club East Bengal announced the signing of Passi, on a one-year deal.

On 22 August, he made his debut against Indian Navy in the Durand Cup, which ended in a 0–0 stalemate. On 28 August, he scored a defining own goal against Kolkata derby rival ATK Mohun Bagan, when a seemingly harmless corner bounced awkwardly in front of him, to deflect inside. Six days later, he scored his first two goals for the club against Mumbai City, in a thrilling 4–3 win.

== International career ==
Passi made his debut for India against Laos on 2 June 2016. He scored his first international goal against Laos on 7 June 2016 with an assist from Jackichand Singh.

== Career statistics ==
=== Club ===
As of 25 February 2023

Club	Season	League			Cup		AFC		Total	
Club	Season	Division	Apps	Goals	Apps	Goals	Apps	Goals	Apps	Goals
Palian Arrows	2012–13	I-League	3	0	0	0	—		3	0
Sporting Goa	2014–15	I-League	4	0	0	0	—		4	0
Sporting Goa	2015–16	I-League	5	3	4 (Note: Appearance(s) in Federation Cup)	2	—		9	5
NorthEast United	2016	Indian Super League	4	0	0	0	—		4	0
DSK Shivajians (loan)	2016–17	I-League	6	0	0	0	—		6	0
Jamshedpur	2017–18	Indian Super League	2	0	1 (Note: Appearance(s) in Super Cup)	0	—		3	0
Jamshedpur	2018–19	Indian Super League	12	2	1	0	—		13	2
Jamshedpur	2019–20	Indian Super League	14	1	0	0	—		14	1
Jamshedpur	Jamshedpur total		28	3	2	0	0	0	30	3
RoundGlass; Punjab	2020–21	I-League	5	0	0	0	—		5	0
RoundGlass; Punjab	2021–22	I-League	17	2	0	0	—		17	2
RoundGlass; Punjab	RoundGlass Punjab total		22	2	0	0	0	0	22	2
East Bengal	2022–23	Indian Super League	11	0	4 (Note: Appearance(s) in Durand Cup)	2	—		15	2
Career total			83	8	10	4	0	0	93	12

=== International ===
As of matches played till 17 November 2018

National team	Year	Apps	Goals
India	2016	3	1
India	2018	5	2
Total		8	3

==== International goals ====
Scores and results list India's goal tally first

No.	Date	Venue	Cap	Opponent	Score	Result	Competition	Ref.
1.	7 June 2016	Indira Gandhi Athletic Stadium, Guwahati, India	2	Laos	2–1	6–1	2019 AFC Asian Cup qualification	
2.	13 August 2016	Changlimithang Stadium, Thimphu, Bhutan	3	Bhutan	3–0	3–0	Friendly	(Note: Non-FIFA match)
3.	12 September 2018	Bangabandhu National Stadium, Dhaka, Bangladesh	7	Pakistan	3–0	3–1	2018 SAFF Championship	
4.	15 September 2018	Bangabandhu National Stadium, Dhaka, Bangladesh	8	Maldives	1–2	1–2	2018 SAFF Championship Final	

== Honours ==
India

- SAFF Championship runner-up: 2018
