= Harmanpreet Singh (footballer) =

Indian footballer (born 2001)

Personal information
- Full name: Harmanpreet Singh
- Date of birth: 2 September 2001 (age 25)
- Place of birth: Punjab, India
- Positions: Striker; right winger

Youth career
- United Punjab FC

Senior career*
Years	Team	Apps	(Gls)
2018–2020	Indian Arrows	14	(0)
2020–2021	East Bengal	7	(0)
2021–2023	Bengaluru	1	(0)
2023	Bengaluru B	12	(2)
2023–2024	Namdhari	20	(5)
2024-2026	Inter Kashi	4	(1)
2024–2025	Inter Club d'Escaldes ( Loan )	0	(0)

International career
2018–2020	India U20	14	(0)
- * Club domestic league appearances and goals

Harmanpreet Singh (Punjabi: ਹਰਮਨਪ੍ਰੀਤ ਸਿੰਘ; born 2 September 2001) is an Indian professional footballer who plays as a winger.

== Career ==
Harmanpreet was signed by Indian Arrows from United Punjab FC. He made his professional debut for the Indian Arrows side against Punjab F.C. on 1 December 2018, He was brought in 86th minute as Indian Arrows lost 1–0.

=== East Bengal ===
In November 2020, Harmanpreet was signed by Indian Super League side East Bengal. He made his debut for the club on 3 January 2021 in a 3–1 win against Odisha as he came on as a substitute in the 72nd minute.

=== Bengaluru FC ===
It was announced on 18 July 2021 that Bengaluru FC had acquired him on a two-year contract.

=== Inter Club d'Escaldes ===
In October 2024, Singh joined Primera Divisió outfit Inter Club d'Escaldes on a loan deal from Inter Kashi.

== Career statistics ==
=== Club ===
As of 14 May 2023

Club	Season	League			Cup		Continental		Total	
Club	Season	Division	Apps	Goals	Apps	Goals	Apps	Goals	Apps	Goals
Indian Arrows	2018–19	I-League	1	0	0	0	—		1	0
Indian Arrows	2019–20	I-League	13	0	0	0	—		13	0
Indian Arrows	Total		14	0	0	0	0	0	14	0
East Bengal	2020–21	Indian Super League	7	0	0	0	—		7	0
Bengaluru	2021–22	Indian Super League	0	0	5 (Note: Appearance(s) in Durand Cup)	2	—		5	2
Bengaluru	2022–23	Indian Super League	1	0	0	0	—		1	0
Bengaluru	Total		1	0	5	2	0	0	6	2
Bengaluru B	2022–23	I-League 2	3	0	4 (Note: Appearance(s) in Reliance Foundation Development League)	0	—		7	0
Namdhari	2023–24	I-League	0	0	0	0	—		0	0
Career total			25	0	9	2	0	0	34	2
