= Abhijit Mondal =

Indian footballer and coach

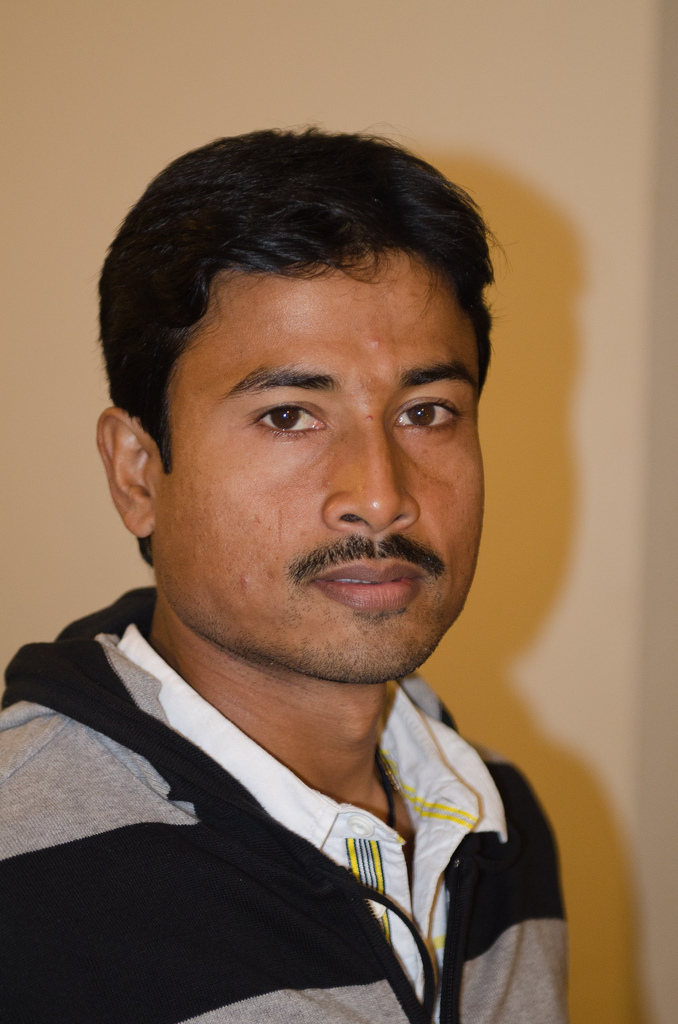
- Mondal in 2011

Personal information
- Full name: Abhijit Mondal
- Date of birth: 1 February 1978 (age 48)
- Place of birth: Balurghat, West Bengal, India
- Height: 1.76 m (5 ft 9 1/2 in)
- Position: Goalkeeper

Team information
- Current team: Inter Kashi (goalkeeper coach)

Senior career*
Years	Team	Apps	(Gls)
2002–2010	Dempo	225	(4)
2010–2012	United S.C.	42	(0)
2012–2014	East Bengal	38	(0)
2013–2014	→ Chennaiyin FC (loan)	24	(0)
2014–2015	United	28	(0)
2015–2016	Mohammedan	24	(0)

International career^{‡}
2006–2012	India	42	(0)

Managerial career
- 2016–2017: East Bengal (goalkeeper coach)
- 2017–2020: ATK Reserves (goalkeeper coach)
- 2019–2020: India U20 (goalkeeper coach)
- 2021–2022: Indian Arrows (goalkeeper coach)
- 2022–2024: Mohan Bagan SG Reserves (goalkeeper coach)
- 2024–2026: Inter Kashi (goalkeeper coach)
- 2026–: Inter Kashi
- * Club domestic league appearances and goals as of 26 October 2025 ‡ National team caps and goals as of 26 October 2025

Abhijit Mondal (born 1 February 1978) is a former Indian professional footballer who played as a goalkeeper, currently acting as the goalkeeping coach of Inter Kashi.

== Managerial career ==
Mondal worked as the goalkeeping coach of India U-20 team at the 2022 SAFF U-20 Championship in Bhubaneswar, and won the tournament.

== Honours ==
=== Player ===
Dempo

- I-League: 2007–08, 2009–10
- Durand Cup: 2006
- Federation Cup: 2004

East Bengal

- IFA Shield: 2012
- Federation Cup: 2012

=== Manager ===
India U-20

- SAFF U-20 Championship: 2022

Inter Kashi

- I-League: 2024–25
