= Bijoy Varghese =

Indian footballer

Personal information
- Date of birth: 14 March 2000 (age 26)
- Place of birth: Pulluvila, Thiruvananthapuram, Kerala, India
- Height: 1.84 m (6 ft 0 in)
- Position: Centre-back

Team information
- Current team: Punjab

Youth career
- 2017–2018: Kovalam FC
- 2018–2020: SAI Thiruvananthapuram

Senior career*
Years	Team	Apps	(Gls)
2020–2023	Kerala Blasters B	10	(0)
2021–2025	Kerala Blasters	6	(0)
2023–2024	→ Inter Kashi (loan)	10	(0)
2025	Inter Kashi	12	(0)
2025–	Punjab	9	(0)

International career^{‡}
2026–	India	6	(0)
- * Club domestic league appearances and goals as of 16:31, 2 May 2026 (UTC) ‡ National team caps and goals as of 22:00, 6 October 2026 (UTC)

Bijoy Varghese (born 14 March 2000) is an Indian professional footballer who plays as a defender for Indian Super League club Punjab and the India national team.

== Early career ==
Bijoy was born in Pulluvila, a coastal village located in the Thiruvananthapuram district, Kerala. Bijoy started playing football during his school days and was a member of his school football team. He initially played as a striker and later switched into central defensive position.

At his 15, Bijoy joined Kovalam Football Club and played for their youth team. In 2018, he became part of the Kerala team, who reached the finals of the International School Championship, where Bijoy won the 'Best Defender of the Tournament' award. After his performance for the Kerala team, Bijoy was selected into the Indian team for Asian school Championship. He was later selected into the SAI football team that participated in the youth league held at Shillong.

Bijoy was included in the final squad of the Kerala team for the 2019–20 Santosh Trophy. However the tournament was cancelled due to COVID-19 pandemic in India.

== Club career ==
=== Kerala Blasters ===
In 2021, he was signed by the Indian Super League club Kerala Blasters to his first ever professional contract and were put into their reserve side. After an impressive performance in the 2020–21 season of Kerala Premier League, Bijoy was promoted to the club's senior side in that year itself to participate in the 2021–22 ISL season. He made his debut for the Blasters against Delhi FC in the 2021 Durand Cup match on 21 September 2021. which they lost 1–0 at full-time. Bijoy made his Indian Super League debut on 19 November 2021 against ATK Mohun Bagan FC, which they lost 4–2.

On 21 April 2022, the Blasters announced that they had extended the contract of Bijoy until 2025. He was given a New Jersey number 21, which the club had retired after Sandesh Jhingan's departure in 2020. He made his first appearance in the 2022–23 Indian Super League season against Hyderabad FC on 26 February 2023 as a substitute for Hormipam Ruivah in the 85th minute but the Blasters lost the match 0–1 at full-time. Bijoy made his first appearance of the season in the 2023 Indian Super Cup match against reigning I-League champions RoundGlass Punjab FC, where he made it to the first team, and the Blasters won the match 3–1 at full-time.

After making just two appearance in the previous season, Bijoy played his first match of the 2023–24 season in the 2023 Durand Cup group stage match against Gokulam Kerala FC on 13 August 2023, which they lost 3–4.

=== Inter Kashi (loan) ===
On 1 September, Kerala Blasters announced that Bijoy has been loaned out to Inter Kashi on a season long deal. He made his debut for the club on 28 October against Gokulam Kerala which ended in 1–1 draw.

=== Punjab ===
On 15 July 2025, Punjab announced the signing of Bijoy, on a multi-year contract running until 2028.

== Career statistics ==
=== Club ===
As of 27 April 2025

Club	Season	League			National Cup		League Cup		AFC		Total	
Club	Season	Division	Apps	Goals	Apps	Goals	Apps	Goals	Apps	Goals	Apps	Goals
Kerala Blasters	2021–22	Indian Super League	5	0	–		1 (Note: Appearance(s) in Durand Cup)	0	–		6	0
Kerala Blasters	2022–23	Indian Super League	1	0	1 (Note: Appearance(s) in Super Cup)	0	–		–		2	0
Kerala Blasters	2023–24	Indian Super League	0	0	–		2	0	–		2	0
Kerala Blasters	Total		6	0	1	0	3	0	0	0	10	0
Kerala Blasters B	2022	RFDL	7	0	–		–		–		7	0
Kerala Blasters B	2023	RFDL	3	0	–		–		–		3	0
Kerala Blasters B	Total		10	0	0	0	0	0	0	0	10	0
Inter Kashi (loan)	2023–24	I-League	10	0	0	0	–		–		10	0
Inter Kashi	2024–25	I-League	12	0	2	0	–		–		14	0
Punjab	2025–26	Indian Super League	0	0	–		0	0	–		0	0
Career total			38	0	3	0	3	0	0	0	44	0

=== International ===
As of 6 October 2026

National team	Year	Apps	Goals
India	2026	6	0
Total		6	0

== Honours ==
Kerala Blasters

- Indian Super League runner up: 2021–22.

India

- SAFF Championship: 2026
