= Inter Kashi FC =

Association football club in India

Inter Kashi
- Full name: Inter Kashi Football Club
- Nicknames: Inter; Kaashee ke Yoddhas (Warriors of Kashi)
- Short name: IKA, IKFC, KSHI
- Founded: 29 June 2023; 3 years ago
- Ground: Shree Shiv Chhatrapati Sports Complex (Balewadi Stadium)
- Capacity: 12,000
- Owner: RDB Group of Companies
- Chairman: Vinod Dugar
- Head coach: Carlos Vaz Pinto
- League: Indian Super League
- 2025–26: Indian Super League, 10th of 14
| Home colours | Away colours | Third colours |

Inter Kashi Football Club, commonly referred to as Inter Kashi, is an Indian professional football club based in Varanasi, Uttar Pradesh. The club currently competes in the Indian Super League (ISL), the top tier of the Indian football league system, after gaining promotion from the I-League in the 2024–25 season.

Founded in 2023, it is the first professional club from the state of Uttar Pradesh to compete in a national-level league. Inter Kashi is affiliated with the Spanish club Atlético Madrid and the Andorran clubs Inter Club d'Escaldes and FC Andorra.

Inter Kashi was also the official Event App Sponsor and Event Partner of Soccerex Miami on 14 November 2024 marking their leap in CONCACAF footballing sector after getting associated with multiple UEFA clubs.

The club finished fourth in the 2023–24 I-League. They later finished as runners-up; however, following a series of appeals before the AIFF Appeal Committee and the Court of Arbitration for Sports, Inter Kashi was declared champions on 18 July 2025, and promoted to the Indian Super League.

== History ==
In May 2023, the All India Football Federation, the governing body of football in India, announced they would accept bids for new clubs to join 2023–24 I-League season onwards. On 29 June 2023, it was announced that agreement for the Varanasi franchise had been reached between Kolkata-based RDB Group of Companies and European clubs Atlético Madrid and Inter Escaldes. FC Andorra has an association with Inter Escaldes, but does not have any direct role with Inter Kashi. The moniker of "Inter" was added because of the tie up with Inter Escaldes.

The club also announced creation of the Atlético de Bharat Academy for the development of grassroots football in the state. Spaniard Carlos Santamarina was chosen as the first head coach of the club, while Javier Broch and Arata Izumi were roped in as assistant coach. English footballer Peter Hartley was the first player signed by the club.

On 28 October 2023, Inter Kashi played their first ever official match against Gokulam Kerala in the I-League. Edmund Lalrindika scored the club's first goal, and Mohammed Asif Khan scored the equalizer to earn the maiden point in a 2–2 draw. Their first win came against Namdhari on 6 November 2023. On 21 November, Inter Kashi played their first I-League home match against Mohammedan in the Ekana Football Stadium in Lucknow. In October 2024, Inter Kashi's two players Sachu Siby and Harmanpreet Singh joined Primera Divisió outfit Inter Club d'Escaldes but Sachu Siby was not able to pursue it because of visa restrictions.

The second season for them remains controversial and is also their first season playing out of Uttar Pradesh after their previous home venue Ekana Football Stadium was declared unfit to play and they had to shift to Kalyani Stadium in Nadia. On 22nd November 2024, they played their first match on their new home ground which also remained the league opener match against SC Bengaluru. Inter Kashi proposed to shift their home stadium from Kalyani Stadium, Nadia to Indira Gandhi Athletic Stadium, Guwahati till their new stadium in Varanasi gets built.

After getting promoted from the I-league, Inter Kashi played their first match of the 2025-26 Indian Super League season on 14 February 2026 against FC Goa, which they drew 1-1.

=== 2024-25 season controversy ===
The second season of Inter Kashi remained controversial while having remarks from various members of Indian football, and allegations by Delhi FC's recent owner Ranjit Bajaj, who also owns Minerva Academy. Inter Kashi appealed against Namdhari FC playing an ineligible player, leading to the AIFF Disciplinary Committee voiding the match and awarded 3 points to Inter Kashi. However, this order was later stayed by the order of AIFF Appeal Committee.

Churchill Alemao, the owner of Churchill Brothers, accused Inter Kashi and the AIFF of pre-match disruptions among the controversial row. Inter Kashi on the other hand raised serious concerns regarding disparity and clarity from the AIFF.

The club also raised concerns regarding rules and mismanagement that happened towards them in the build-up to the match between the two teams, which was set to be a season-decider. The Varanasi-based club made allegations against Churchill Brothers for not letting them practice on the match venue ground the day before the match, which is mandated the in AIFF rule book. This match remained so controversial that the AIFF had to invite referees to officiate the match from Nepal.

The eventual match saw eight yellow cards, one red card and a controversial goal for Churchill, which Kashi claimed to be a handball but was given by the referees. Later, Namdhari FC also appealed against Inter Kashi for breaking foreigner registration rules in the I-League, relating to the re-registration of Spanish forward Mario Barco.

After the season ended, the AIFF eventually declared Churchill Brothers as winners, and Inter Kashi as runners-up. In response, on 27 April 2025, Inter Kashi went to CAS against the AIFF Appeals Committee's decision to award the I-League title to Churchill Brothers. This decision was made after the AIFF Appeals Committee reversed an earlier decision that awarded the title to Inter Kashi. CAS proceeded to issue an order staying the AIFF Appeals Committee's decision. The court also issued an order to prevent AIFF from declaring a winner, or holding a medal ceremony until the CAS arbitration is concluded.

However, the AIFF still conducted the ceremony disregarding CAS's decision, and awarded the trophy and medals to Churchill's players. The ceremony was also conducted without the presence of State Football Association in the ceremony. This action drew criticism from the Goa Football Association, and raised questions about the AIFF's credibility and its relationship with state associations.

The AIFF later acknowledged the CAS stay order and asked Churchill Brothers to return the trophy. The AIFF's decision was eventually overturned by a CAS ruling on 18 July 2025, which crowned Inter Kashi champions of the I-League 2024–25.

== Stadium ==
In January 2026, Inter Kashi signed a MoU with C.M. Anglo Bengali College to build a 5,500 capacity AFC-rated dedicated football stadium at the cost of ₹60 crore.

== Inter Kashi FC (women) ==
The women team took part in the 2024–25 Indian Women's League 2, marking their debut season in female football.

== Junior section ==
Inter Kashi fielded their junior section in Under 17 2024–25 Indian Youth League and Under 13 Sub Junior Youth League.

=== Under 17 ===
The Under 17 side finished last in their debut season winning against SKM Sporting Foundation. It was their first season in any league playing in their home city Varanasi on BLW Railways Ground.

==== Coaching history ====
As of 1 April 2025

| Name | Nationality | From | To | P | W | D | L | Win% | Ref. |
|---|---|---|---|---|---|---|---|---|---|
| Devan Daniel Kalathil Palankandi | Italy | 4 January 2025 | 29 March 2025 | 10 | 1 | 2 | 7 | 10% | |
| Deepak Deshwal | India | 31 April 2025 | present | | | | | | |

=== Under 13 ===
==== Coaching history ====
As of 1 April 2025

| Name | Nationality | From | To | P | W | D | L | Win percentage | Ref. |
|---|---|---|---|---|---|---|---|---|---|
| Bimlesh Yadav | India | 28 April 2025 | present | 3 | 1 | 0 | 1 | 33.33% | |

== Atlético de Bharat Academy ==
The club announced opening of Atlético de Bharat Residential Academy in Sant Atulanand Convent School with partnership of Dr. Vandana Singh, the school director, for U13, U15 and U17 batch in Varanasi on 25th March 2025. The club has already hosted a futsal tournament Futsal For All Day on 27 August 2024, with partnership of Sant Atulanand Convent School, Uttar Pradesh Football Sangh and the All India Football Federation with 21 teams competing across 5 categories. The club also hosted Inter Kashi Purnima Masik Pratiyogita in the same venue on 17 September 2024, as a tournament where 120 children from two NGOs (Meera Foundation and Sewa Samarpan Sansthan) participated. The club has also announced pan-India trials for their academy happening in 10 states and 1 union territory.

== Club crest and kits ==
=== Crest ===
In the Inter Kashi's crest, Tripundra (three horizontal lines on the top of the crest) resembles Lord Shiva's threefold power of will (icchāśakti), knowledge (jñānaśakti), and action (kriyāśakti). The graphical image below the club name on the crest portraits Manikarnika Ghat.

Their third kit was released on 18 January 2025 as a tribute to Maha Kumbh held on Prayagraj.

=== Kit manufacturers and shirt sponsors ===
| Period | Kit manufacturer | Shirt sponsor | Back sponsor |
|---|---|---|---|
| 2023–24 | SIX5SIX | Cello | Uttar Pradesh Tourism |
| 2024–25 | Hummel | UCO Bank | IndiaShoppe |
| 2025–26 | Hummel | UCO Bank | InsureFirst |
| 2026–27 | Ambition | ISGL | |

== Players ==
=== First-team squad ===
As of 1 October 2026

Note: Flags indicate national team as defined under FIFA eligibility rules; some limited exceptions apply. Players may hold more than one non-FIFA nationality.

| No. | Pos. | Nation | Player |
|---|---|---|---|
| 1 | GK | IND | Shubham Dhas |
| 2 | DF | IND | Nishchal Chandan |
| 3 | DF | IND | Aritra Das |
| 4 | DF | IND | Pratik Chaudhari |
| 5 | MF | IND | Wayne Vaz |
| 6 | DF | IND | Sajad Hussain Parray |
| 9 | FW | IND | Manvir Singh |
| 11 | FW | IND | Ashangbam Aphaoba Singh |
| 14 | MF | IND | Jitendra Singh |
| 15 | MF | IND | Karthik Panicker |
| 16 | DF | IND | Tanush Pandey |

| No. | Pos. | Nation | Player |
|---|---|---|---|
| 17 | FW | IND | Rosenberg Gabriel |
| 18 | MF | IND | Hitesh Sharma |
| 19 | DF | IND | Leewan Castanha |
| 20 | FW | IND | Thoi Singh Huidrom |
| 25 | FW | IND | Sumeet Passi (captain) |
| 26 | DF | IND | Laldinliana Renthlei |
| 28 | FW | IND | Ayush Chhikara |
| 31 | GK | IND | Mohit Singh Dhami |
| 32 | GK | IND | Albino Gomes |
| 33 | DF | IND | Gursimrat Singh Gill |
| 41 | FW | IND | Sreekuttan VS |

== Staff and management ==
=== Current staff ===
| Position | Name |
|---|---|
| Head coach | (India) Abhijit Mondal |
| Assistant coach | (India) Arindam Bhattacharya |
| Goalkeeping coach | (India) Abhijit Mondal |
| Team manager | (India) Abdeali Fatema Deesawala |
| Media manager | (India) Bhaswar Dey |

=== Management ===
| Position | Name |
|---|---|
| Chairman | (India) Vinod Dugar |
| President | (India) Prithijit Das |
| Co-founder | (India) Aryaman Shukla |
| Chief Operations Officer | (India) Bhaskar Basu |

== Records and statistics ==
=== Season by season ===
Correct as the end of the 2024–25 season.

| Season | League | | | | | | | | | Super Cup | Durand Cup | Top scorer(s) | |
| Season | Division | Pld | W | D | L | GF | GA | Pts | Pos | Super Cup | Durand Cup | Player(s) | Goals |
|---|---|---|---|---|---|---|---|---|---|---|---|---|---|
| 2023–24 | I-League | 24 | 11 | 8 | 5 | 47 | 41 | 41 | 4th | Group stage | — | (Spain) Mario Barco | 12 |
| 2024–25 | I-League ↑ | 22 | 12 | 6 | 4 | 42 | 31 | 42 | 1st | Quarter-finals | Group stage | (Serbia) Nikola Stojanović | 9 |
| 2025–26 | ISL | 8 | 3 | 2 | 3 | 8 | 9 | 11 | 8th | Group stage | DNP | TBD | TBD |

== Coaching history ==
As of 11 May 2026

| Name | Nationality | From | To | P | W | D | L | Win% | Ref. |
|---|---|---|---|---|---|---|---|---|---|
| Carlos Santamarina | Spain | 7 July 2023 | 31 May 2024 | 26 | 10 | 9 | 7 | 38.46 | |
| Antonio López | Spain | 25 July 2024 | 11 May 2026 | 32 | 15 | 8 | 9 | 46.88 | |
| Arata Izumi (caretaker) (Note: In charge of the 2024 Durand Cup) | India | 27 July 2024 | 31 August 2024 | 3 | 1 | 1 | 1 | 33.33 | |
| Carlos Fonseca (caretaker) (Note: In charge of the 2025 AIFF Super Cup) | Spain | 23 April 2025 | 27 April 2025 | 2 | 0 | 1 | 1 | 0.00 | |
| Abhijit Mondal (caretaker) (Note: In charge of the 2025–26 AIFF Super Cup) | India | 26 October 2025 | 1 November 2025 | 3 | 0 | 1 | 2 | 0.00 | |
| Abhijit Mondal | India | 11 May 2026 | Current | | | | | | |

=== Top scorers ===
As of 14 February 2026

Bold denotes players still playing for Inter Kashi.

| # | Player | Period | I-League / ISL | Super Cup | Durand Cup | Total |
|---|---|---|---|---|---|---|
| 1 | (Spain) **Mario Barco** | 2023– | 16 | 2 | 0 | 18 |
| 2 | (Serbia) Nikola Stojanović | 2024–2025 | 9 | 0 | 2 | 11 |
| 3 | (India) Edmund Lalrindika | 2023–2025 | 8 | 2 | 0 | 10 |
| 4 | (Spain) Jordan Lamela | 2023–24 | 6 | 0 | 0 | 6 |
| 4 | (Morocco) Domi Berlanga | 2024–2025 | 6 | 0 | 0 | 6 |
| 6 | (India) Mohammed Asif Khan | 2023–2025 | 5 | 0 | 0 | 5 |
| 6 | (India) Gyamar Nikum | 2023–2024 | 4 | 1 | 0 | 5 |
| 6 | (India) **Tomba Singh Haobam** | 2023– | 3 | 1 | 1 | 5 |
| 9 | (India) Muhammad Ajsal | 2023–2024 | 3 | 1 | 0 | 4 |
| 10 | (India) **Prasanth K** | 2025– | 3 | 0 | 0 | 3 |
| 10 | (Finland) Joni Kauko | 2024–2025 | 3 | 0 | 0 | 3 |
| 10 | (India) **Sumeet Passi** | 2023– | 3 | 0 | 0 | 3 |
| 10 | (Serbia) Matija Babović | 2025 | 2 | 1 | 0 | 3 |

=== Club captains ===
| Period | Name |
|---|---|
| 2023–2024 | (India) Arindam Bhattacharya |
| 2024– | (India) Sumeet Passi |

== Honours ==
=== Domestic ===
League

- I-League
  - Champions (1): 2024–25

== Notable players ==
The following Inter Kashi players have been capped at senior/youth international level. Years in brackets indicate their spells at the club.

- (India) Sehnaj Singh (2023)
- (Spain) Fran Gómez (2023–2024)
- (India) Jackichand Singh (2023–2024)
- (India) Deepak Devrani (2023–2024), (2024–2026)
- (India) Lalruatthara (2023–2024)
- (India) Edmund Lalrindika (2023–2025)
- (India) Bijoy Varghese (2023–2024), (2025)
- (India) Arindam Bhattacharya (2023–2026)
- (India) Sumeet Passi (2023–)
- (India) Tomba Singh Haobam (2023–)
- (India) Sandip Mandi (2023–)
- (Cape Verde) Gianni dos Santos (2024)
- (Finland) Joni Kauko (2024–2025)
- (India) Narayan Das (2024–2025)
- (India) Sarthak Golui (2024–2025)
- (India) Harmanpreet Singh (2024–2026)
- (India) Prasanth K (2024–2025), (2026–)
- (India) Bryce Miranda (2025)
- (Serbia) Matija Babović (2025–2026)
- (India) Prabir Das (2025–)
- (India) Mohit Singh Dhami (2025–)
- (India) Nishu Kumar (2026–)
- (India) Seiminlen Doungel (2026–)
- (India) Jayesh Rane (2026–)
- (Lithuania) Nauris Petkevičius (2026–)
- (India) Narender Gahlot (2026–)
- (India) Rohit Danu (2026–)

== Affiliated clubs ==
The following clubs are affiliated with Inter Kashi:

- (Spain) Atlético Madrid
- (Andorra) Inter Club d'Escaldes
- FC Andorra

== See also ==
- List of football clubs in India
