= Nikola Stojanović (footballer, born 1995) =

Serbian footballer (born 1995)

Personal information
- Full name: Nikola Stojanović
- Date of birth: 17 February 1995 (age 31)
- Place of birth: Belgrade, FR Yugoslavia
- Height: 1.84 m (6 ft 1/2 in)
- Position: Central midfielder

Team information
- Current team: Chennaiyin

Youth career
- –2014: Partizan
- 2014–2015: Ergotelis

Senior career*
Years	Team	Apps	(Gls)
2015	Ergotelis	3	(0)
2015–2016	Sinđelić Beograd	4	(0)
2016–2017	OFK Beograd	6	(2)
2017	Sloboda Užice	12	(2)
2018	Minsk	9	(0)
2018	Sparta PAE	10	(1)
2019–2020	Bačka Palanka	7	(0)
2020	Dečić Tuzi	9	(0)
2020	Petrovac	15	(0)
2021–2023	Mohammedan	30	(5)
2024	Gokulam Kerala	9	(5)
2024–2025	Inter Kashi	22	(9)
2025–2026	Jamshedpur	13	(2)
2026–	Chennaiyin	2	(0)
- * Club domestic league appearances and goals as of 26 October 2026

Nikola Stojanović (Никола Стојановић; born 17 February 1995) is a Serbian professional footballer who plays as a central midfielder for Indian Super League club Chennaiyin.

== Playing career ==
=== Mohammedan Sporting ===
In June 2021, Stojanović moved to India and signed with Mohammedan Sporting that competes in the I-League. On 18 August, he debuted for the club in 2021 CFL Premier Division, with a 3–0 win against Southern Samity. He scored a goal in that match. He was part of the team's 2021 Durand Cup campaign, in which he captained all their matches, and reached to the final, defeating FC Bengaluru United 4–2. On 3 October 2021, they lost the title winning match 1–0 to ISL side FC Goa.

He also appeared in the 2021 CFL Premier Division league, in which Mohammedan reached to the final, defeating United SC 1–0. On 18 November, Mohammedan clinched their 12th Calcutta Football League title after forty long years, defeating Railway FC 1–0 under his captaincy. Under Stojanović's captaincy, Mohammedan for the first time, ran for their maiden national league title in 2021–22 I-League season, but finished as runners-up after a 2–1 defeat to Gokulam Kerala at the end. After leaving the club in early season, Stojanović rejoined Mohammedan on 6 November 2022.

=== Gokulam Kerala ===
Nikola Stojanovic returns to India to join the Malabarians.

== Career statistics ==
=== Club ===
As of 07 April 2024

Club	Season	League			National Cup (Note: Includes Greek Cup, Serbian Cup, Super Cup)		Others		Continental		Total	
Club	Season	Division	Apps	Goals	Apps	Goals	Apps	Goals	Apps	Goals	Apps	Goals
Ergotelis	2014–15	Super League	3	0	1	0	0	0	–		4	0
Sinđelić Beograd	2015–16	Serbian League	4	0	0	0	0	0	–		4	0
OFK Beograd	2016–17	Serbian League	6	2	0	0	0	0	0	0	6	2
Sloboda Užice	2017–18	Serbian League	12	2	1	0	0	0	0	0	13	2
Minsk	2018	Belarusian League	9	0	0	0	0	0	–		9	0
Sparta	2018–19	Gamma Ethniki	10	1	1	0	0	0	–		11	1
Bačka Palanka	2019–20	Serbian League	7	0	0	0	0	0	–		7	0
Dečić Tuzi	2019–20	Montenegrin League 2	9	0	0	0	0	0	–		9	0
Petrovac	2020–21	Montenegrin League	15	0	1	0	0	0	–		16	0
Mohammedan	2021–22	I-League	17	2	0	0	6 (Note: Appearance(s) in Durand Cup)	1	—		23	3
Mohammedan	2022–23	I-League	13	3	1	0	0	0	—		14	3
Mohammedan	Total		30	5	1	0	6	1	0	0	37	6
Gokulam Kerala	2023–24	I-League	9	5	2	0	0	0	—		11	5
Inter Kashi	2024–25	I-League	22	9	2	0	3	2	—		27	11
Jamshedpur	2025–26	Indian Super League	13	2	2	0	0	0	—		15	2
Chennaiyin	2026–27	Indian Super League	0	0	0	0	0	0	—		0	0
Career total			156	26	11	0	9	3	0	0	176	29

== Honours ==
Mohammedan Sporting

- Calcutta Football League: 2021

Inter Kashi

- I-League: 2024–25
