= 2025–26 East Bengal FC season =

Indian football club season

East Bengal
2025–26 season
- Owner: East Bengal Football Club
- Head coach: Óscar Bruzón
- Stadium: Salt Lake Stadium; East Bengal Ground
- Indian Super League: Champions
- Calcutta Football League: Champions
- Durand Cup: Semi Finals
- IFA Shield: Runner-up
- Super Cup: Runner-up
- Oil India Gold Cup: Quarter Finals
- Sikkim Gold Cup: Quarter Finals
- Top goalscorer: League: Youssef Ezzejjari (11 goals); All: Youssef Ezzejjari (11 goals)
- Highest home attendance: 22,899 vs Jamshedpur (27 February 2026, ISL)
- Lowest home attendance: 11,213 vs Mohammedan (23 March 2026, ISL)
- Average home league attendance: 18,693
- Biggest win: 7–0 Mohammedan (23 March 2026, ISL)
- Biggest defeat: 0–2 Police AC (3 August 2025, CFL)
Home colours	Away colours	Third colours

The 2025–26 season was the 106th season of East Bengal Football Club and their sixth season in the Indian Super League, and the thirtieth consecutive season in the top flight of Indian football. The club finished as the champions of the 2025–26 Indian Super League ending a twenty-two year wait for a national league title for the club.

Before the start of the season, East Bengal was very active in the transfer market. The club roped in some quality domestic and international players and started their preseason early in July. The season began with a semi-final exit in the Durand Cup, followed by two final defeats via penalty-shootout in the IFA Shield and AIFF Super Cup. The club then began the Indian Super League campaign with two victories in the first two matches. The club suffered only one defeat in the campaign followed by a ten-match undefeated run till the final match against Inter Kashi where East Bengal won 2–1 to lift the title. Youssef Ezzejjari won the golden-boot of the league with eleven goals and Miguel Figueira was awarded with the best player of the league golden-ball award.

== Background ==
East Bengal finished ninth in the 2024–25 Indian Super League. Just after the season finished, East Bengal appointed former Hyderabad and Shillong Lajong manager Thangboi Singto as the Head of Football at the club. The club became active right after the end of the previous season, roping in Indian wingers Bipin Singh Thounaojam from Mumbai City for free, and Edmund Lalrindika from Inter Kashi for ₹1.45 crore (US$150,000) transfer-fee ahead of the start of the new season. East Bengal also roped in Martand Raina from Rajasthan United for ₹25 lakh (US$27,000). The club also signed Ramsanga Tlaichhun from Real Kashmir on a free transfer. East Bengal also renewed the contract of head coach Oscar Bruzon for one more season keeping him at the club till the end of the 2025–26 season. On 12 June, the club announced the departure of three foreign players: Richard Celis, Messi Bouli and Héctor Yuste as their contract were not renewed.

== Transfers ==
=== Incoming ===
Date	No.	Pos.	Name	Signed from	Fee	Ref
9 July 2025	16	DF	(India) Martand Raina	(India) Rajasthan United	Undisclosed (Note: Reported as ₹25 lakh (US$27,000).)	
11 July 2025	31	MF	(India) Ramsanga Tlaichhun	(India) Real Kashmir	Free Transfer	
13 July 2025	29	MF	(India) Bipin Singh Thounaojam	(India) Mumbai City	Free Transfer	
13 July 2025	10	MF	(India) Edmund Lalrindika	(India) Inter Kashi	Undisclosed (Note: Reported as ₹1.45 crore (US$150,000).)	
15 July 2025	27	DF	(India) Jay Gupta	(India) FC Goa	Undisclosed (Note: Reported as ₹1.6 crore (US$170,000).)	
18 July 2025	8	MF	(Brazil) Miguel Figueira	(Bangladesh) Bashundhara Kings	Free Transfer	
18 July 2025	74	MF	(Palestine) Mohammed Rashid	(Indonesia) Persebaya Surabaya	Free Transfer	
18 July 2025	6	DF	(Argentina) Kevin Sibille	(Spain) Ponferradina	Free Transfer	
29 July 2025	17	FW	(Morocco) Hamid Ahadad	(Morocco) Raja CA	Free Transfer	
17 September 2025	9	FW	(Japan) Hiroshi Ibusuki	(Australia) Western United	Free Transfer	
29 January 2026	17	FW	(India) Jerry Mawihmingthanga	(India) Odisha	Free Transfer	
6 February 2026	9	FW	(Spain) Youssef Ezzejjari	(Singapore) Tanjong Pagar United	Free Transfer	
18 February 2026	77	FW	(Denmark) Anton Søjberg	(United States) Monterey Bay	Free Transfer	
▼ Spending: ₹3.3 crore (US$350,000)

=== Outgoing ===
Exit Date	No.	Pos.	Name	Signed to	Fee	Ref
16 April 2025	10	FW	(Brazil) Cleiton Silva	—	Released	
12 June 2025	7	FW	(Venezuela) Richard Celis	(Ecuador) Técnico Universitario	Released	
12 June 2025	28	FW	(Cameroon) Messi Bouli	(India) Jamshedpur FC	Released	
12 June 2025	44	DF	(Spain) Héctor Yuste	—	Released	
14 July 2025	22	DF	(India) Nishu Kumar	(India) Jamshedpur FC	Released	
17 July 2025	19	DF	(Jordan) Hijazi Maher	(Jordan) Al-Faisaly	Released	
1 September 2025	9	FW	(Greece) Dimitrios Diamantakos	(Cyprus) APOEL FC	Released	
4 September 2025	33	DF	(India) Gursimrat Singh Gill	(India) Rajasthan United FC	Released	
28 September 2025	8	MF	(France) Madih Talal	(India) Jamshedpur FC	Released	
1 October 2025	88	MF	(India) Mark Zothanpuia	(India) Jamshedpur FC	Released	
5 January 2026	17	FW	(Morocco) Hamid Ahadad	(Morocco) Hassania Agadir	Released	
15 January 2026	9	FW	(Japan) Hiroshi Ibusuki	(Australia) Western Sydney Wanderers	Released	
▲ Income: ₹0

== Team ==
=== First-team squad ===
The below list contains the names and details of the players registered for the first-team squad for East Bengal. This list does not include any reserve player who has never played in the first-team squad.

As of 21 May 2026

No.	Name	Nat.	Pos.	Date of Birth (Age)	Signed From	Signed In	Contact Ends	Apps	Goals	Assists
Goalkeepers
13	Prabhsukhan Singh Gill (vice–captain)	(India)	GK	2 January 2001 (age 25)	(India) Kerala Blasters	2023	2026	86	0	0
24	Debjit Majumder	(India)	GK	6 March 1988 (age 38)	(India) Chennaiyin	2024	2026	32	0	0
26	Aaryan Anjaneya	(India)	GK	8 December 2000 (age 25)	(India) Thiruvanant. Kombans	2025	2026	0	0	0
95	Gourab Shaw	(India)	GK	4 May 2004 (age 22)	(India) Calcutta Port Trust	2023	2026	5	0	0
Defenders
3	Provat Lakra	(India)	RB	12 August 1997 (age 29)	(India) Jamshedpur	2024	2026	30	1	1
4	Anwar Ali	(India)	CB	28 August 2000 (age 26)	(India) Delhi FC	2024	2029	45	6	2
5	Lalchungnunga	(India)	CB	25 December 2000 (age 25)	(India) Sreenidi Deccan	2022	2026	96	3	2
6	Kevin Sibille	(Argentina)	CB	15 September 1998 (age 28)	(Spain) Ponferradina	2025	2026	19	2	2
12	Mohammad Rakip	(India)	RB	14 May 2000 (age 26)	(India) Mumbai City	2022	2026	94	0	0
16	Martand Raina	(India)	CB	10 September 2000 (age 26)	(India) Rajasthan United	2025	2028	7	0	0
27	Jay Gupta	(India)	LB	27 September 2001 (age 25)	(India) FC Goa	2025	2029	18	1	0
Midfielders
7	Vishnu PV	(India)	LW	24 December 2001 (age 24)	(India) Muthoot	2023	2028	101	21	19
8	Miguel Figueira	(Brazil)	CM	22 April 2000 (age 26)	(Bangladesh) Bashundhara Kings	2025	2026	24	3	9
15	Naorem Mahesh Singh (captain)	(India)	LW	1 March 1999 (age 27)	(India) Kerala Blasters	2022	2027	115	16	19
17	Jerry Mawihmingthanga	(India)	FW	9 March 1997 (age 29)	(India) Odisha	2026	2026	2	0	0
21	Saúl Crespo	(Spain)	CM	23 July 1996 (age 30)	(India) Odisha	2024	2026	68	17	9
23	Souvik Chakrabarti	(India)	CM	12 July 1991 (age 35)	(India) Hyderabad	2022	2027	91	1	2
25	Jeakson Singh	(India)	DM	21 June 2001 (age 25)	(India) Kerala Blasters	2024	2028	46	3	0
29	Bipin Singh	(India)	LW	10 March 1995 (age 31)	(India) Mumbai City	2025	2027	26	6	8
31	Ramsanga Tlaichhun	(India)	DM	24 April 2000 (age 26)	(India) Real Kashmir	2025	2028	5	0	0
74	Mohammed Rashid	(Palestine)	DM	3 July 1995 (age 31)	(Indonesia) Persebaya Surabaya	2025	2026	24	4	1
84	Sayan Banerjee	(India)	LW	14 January 2003 (age 23)	(India) Kalighat MS	2023	2026	45	11	6
Forwards
9	Youssef Ezzejjari	(Spain)	FW	10 May 1993 (age 33)	(Singapore) Tanjong Pagar United	2026	2026	13	11	0
10	Edmund Lalrindika	(India)	FW	24 April 1999 (age 27)	(India) Inter Kashi	2025	2027	31	4	5
11	Nandhakumar Sekar	(India)	FW	20 December 1995 (age 30)	(India) Odisha	2023	2026	68	15	6
14	David Lalhlansanga	(India)	FW	27 November 2001 (age 24)	(India) Mohammedan Sporting	2024	2027	50	12	4
59	Jesin TK	(India)	FW	19 February 2000 (age 26)	(India) Kerala United	2022	2026	46	26	13
77	Anton Søjberg	(Denmark)	FW	21 December 2000 (age 25)	(United States) Monterey Bay FC	2026	2026	10	1	0

=== New contracts ===
No.	Pos.	Date	Name	Ref.
23	MF	5 July 2024	(India) Souvik Chakrabarti	
82	RW/LW	7 July 2024	(India) Vishnu PV	

=== Current technical staff ===
Position	Name
Head of Football Operations	(India) Thangboi Singto
Head coach	(Spain) Óscar Bruzón
Assistant coach	(Spain) Adrian Rubio Martinez
Assistant coach	(India) Bino George
Goalkeeping Coach	(India) Felix D'Souza
Strength & Conditioning Coach	(Spain) Javier Sánchez Flores
Head of Physiotherapist	(India) Dr. Firoz Shaikh
Assistant Physiotherapist	(India) Arghya Bose
Assistant Physiotherapist	(India) Tejas Lasalkar
Performance Analyst	(India) Aromal Vijayan
Team Manager	(India) Pratim Kumar Saha
Team Doctor	(India) Dr. Mustufa Poonawalla
Masseur	(India) Rajesh Basak
Masseur	(India) Robin Das
Masseur	(India) Raju Bose

== Preseason and Friendlies ==
East Bengal started their senior team preseason under coach Óscar Bruzón on 13 July 2025 with two weeks in hand for the 2025 Durand Cup. On 30 July, East Bengal played a friendly match against Bhawanipore FC and won the match 4–2. Miguel scored a brace while Diamantakos and Hamid scored one each in the match. On 28 November, East Bengal played a friendly match with Dempo in preparation for their semi-final encounter in the Super Cup, scheduled a week later. East Bengal won the match 4–1 with a brace from Hiroshi and one goal each by Hamid and Saúl.

=== Matches ===
Win Draw Loss

30 July 2025 Friendly	East Bengal	4–2	Bhawanipore	Kolkata
10:00 IST	Diamantakos (?); Figueira (?); Ahadad (?)		Ricky Lallawmawma (?); na (?)	Stadium: AIFF National Center of Excellence; Attendance: 0 (Note: Closed door friendly match.)

28 November 2025 Friendly	East Bengal	4–1	Dempo	Bambolim
16:30 IST	Hiroshi (?); Ahadad (?); Saúl (?)		na (?)	Stadium: GMC Athletic Stadium; Attendance: 0

13 January 2026 Friendly	East Bengal	4–0	Bengal	Kolkata
09:30 IST	Lalhlansanga (?); Mahesh (?); Vishnu (?); Lalrindika (?)			Stadium: Salt Lake Stadium; Attendance: 0

3 February 2026 Friendly	East Bengal	2–1	Sreenidi Deccan	Kolkata
09:30 IST	Vishnu (?); Gupta (?)			Stadium: AIFF National Center of Excellence; Attendance: 0

8 February 2026 Friendly	East Bengal	2–0	Mohammedan	Kolkata
15:00 IST	Lalhlansanga (?); Sekar (?)	Report		Stadium: East Bengal Ground; Attendance: 1000

== Competitions ==
=== Overall record ===
Note: Penalty shoot-out wins or losses are counted as draws, as per the official standard.

Competition	First match	Last match	Starting round	Final position	Record							
Competition	First match	Last match	Starting round	Final position	Pld	W	D	L	GF	GA	GD	Win %
Durand Cup	23 July 2025	20 August 2025	Group stage	Semi-final	5	4	0	1	15	4	+11	80.00
IFA Shield	8 October 2025	18 October 2025	Group stage	Runners-up	3	2	1	0	7	1	+6	66.67
Super Cup	25 October 2025	7 December 2025	Group stage	Runners-up	5	2	3	0	9	3	+6	40.00
Indian Super League	16 February 2026	21 May 2026	Matchday 1	Winners	13	7	5	1	30	11	+19	53.85
Calcutta Football League (Note: East Bengal fielded mostly their Reserve squad for the tournament, with Bino George taking charge as the head coach.) (Note: Later 26 points from 12 matches, as Army Red didn't field their team in group stage, thus IFA gave free 3 points to all other teams of Group A with 3–0 victory.)	27 June 2025	22 September 2025	Group League	Winners	15	11	2	2	41	12	+29	73.33
Oil India Challenge Gold Cup (Note: East Bengal fielded their Reserve squad for the tournament, with Archisman Biswas taking charge as the head coach.)	25 October 2025		Quarter-final	Quarter-final	1	0	0	1	0	1	−1	0.00
Sikkim Gold Cup	25 November 2025		Quarter-final	Quarter-final	1	0	0	1	0	1	−1	0.00
Total					43	26	11	6	102	33	+69	60.47

Source: Soccerway

=== Durand Cup ===
East Bengal participated in the 2025 Durand Cup and was grouped into Group A alongside Namdhari, South United and Indian Air Force and would play their group stage matches in Kolkata. On 23 July, East Bengal began their campaign with a 5–0 victory over South United at the Salt Lake Stadium. East Bengal faced Namdhari in their second fixture of the Durand Cup. The match ended in a 1–0 victory as Hamid Ahadad found the back of the net from a corner kick taken by Miguel Figueira. In the third fixture, East Bengal defeated Indian Air Force 6–1 with goals as East Bengal topped the group with three wins and qualify for the quarter-finals. East Bengal were drawn with Mohun Bagan Super Giant in the quarter-final played on 17 August 2025. East Bengal sealed a 2–1 win courtesy a brace by Dimitrios Diamantakos. On 20 August, East Bengal faced Diamond Harbour in the semi final of the Durand Cup and suffered a shock defeat as Diamond Harbour won 2–1 in an unprecedented result as East Bengal crashed out of the tournament.

==== Group stage ====
Pos	Team	Pld	W	D	L	GF	GA	GD	Pts	Qualification	EAB	NAM	IAF	SOU
1	East Bengal (H)	3	3	0	0	12	1	+11	9	knockout stage		1–0	6–1	5–0
2	Namdhari	3	2	0	1	6	3	+3	6				4–2	2–0
3	Indian Air Force	3	0	1	2	5	12	−7	1					3–3
4	South United	3	0	1	2	3	10	−7	1					

Source: DFTS
Legend: Blue = home team win; Yellow = draw; Red = away team win.
Rules for classification: Group stage tiebreakers
(H) Hosts

==== Bracket ====
Quarter-finals
16 Aug – Shillong
Shillong Lajong	2
Indian Navy	1
16 Aug – Kokrajhar
Bodoland	0
NorthEast United	4
17 Aug – Jamshedpur
Jamshedpur	0
Diamond Harbour	2
17 Aug – Kolkata
East Bengal	2
Mohun Bagan	1

Semi-finals
19 Aug – Shillong
Shillong Lajong	0
NorthEast United	1
20 Aug – Kolkata
Diamond Harbour	2
East Bengal	1

Final
23 Aug – Kolkata
NorthEast United	6
Diamond Harbour	1

==== Matches ====
Win Draw Loss Void

23 July 2025 Group stage	East Bengal	5–0	South United	Kolkata
17:30 IST	Lalchungnunga 12'; Saúl 38' (pen.); Lakra (yellow card) 76'; Bipin 80'; Diamantakos 88'; Mahesh 90'	Report	Rowan James (yellow card) 51'; Hyzafah Ahmad Dar (yellow card) 62'; Talib Nazir (yellow card) 86'	Stadium: Salt Lake Stadium; Attendance: 18,546; Referee: Aditya Purkayastha; Man of the Match: Naorem Mahesh Singh (East Bengal)

6 August 2025 Group stage	East Bengal	1–0	Namdhari	Kolkata
19:00 IST	Mahesh (yellow card) 42'; Hamid 68'; Miguel (yellow card) 71'	Report	Dé (yellow card) 36'; Akashdeep (yellow card) 38'	Stadium: Salt Lake Stadium; Attendance: 6,292; Referee: Lakshay; Man of the Match: Mohammed Rashid (East Bengal)

10 August 2025 Group stage	East Bengal	6–1	Indian Air Force	Kolkata
19:00 IST	Hamid 7'; Bipin 26'; Anwar 64'; Rashid 68'; Saúl 85'; David 90+1'	Report	Aman Khan 36'; Md. Aqib (yellow card) 67'	Stadium: Kishore Bharati Krirangan; Attendance: 8,395; Referee: Shantan Agrawal; Man of the Match: Subhajit Basu (Indian Air Force)

17 August 2025^{(KD)} Quarter-final	Mohun Bagan SG	1–2	East Bengal	Kolkata
19:00 IST	Thapa 68'; Apuia (yellow card) 45+3'; Tangri (yellow card) 90+4'; Petratos (yellow card) 90+4'	Report	Diamantakos 38' (pen.), 52' (yellow card) 52'; Saúl (yellow card) 43'; Miguel (yellow card) 45+2'; Rakip (yellow card) 71'; Lalchungnunga (yellow card) 90+4'; Souvik (yellow card) 90+4'	Stadium: Salt Lake Stadium; Attendance: 58,676; Referee: Venkatesh R Man of the Match: Dimitrios Diamantakos (East Bengal)

20 August 2025 Semi-final	Diamond Harbour	2–1	East Bengal	Kolkata
19:00 IST	Sairuat Kima (yellow card) 23'; Melroy (yellow card) 66'; Kortazar 66'; Jobby 83'	Report	Lalchungnunga (yellow card) 33'; Anwar 67'	Stadium: Salt Lake Stadium; Attendance: 18,960; Referee: Harish Kundu; Man of the Match: Mirshad Michu (Diamond Harbour)

=== IFA Shield ===
East Bengal will participate in the IFA Shield and was grouped into Group A alongside Namdhari and Sreenidi Deccan. In the opening match on 8 October at the Kalyani Stadium, East Bengal defeated Sreenidhi Deccan by 4–0 with goals from Jay Gupta, Saúl Crespo, Hamid Ahadad and Jeakson Singh. East Bengal faced Namdhari in the all-important group A decider which they won 2–0 with goals from Mohammed Rashid and P.V. Vishnu and sealed a spot in the final held on 18 October. In the final, East Bengal faced Mohun Bagan SG and took the lead in 36th minute courtesy a goal from Hamid Ahadad, but Apuia scored in 45+3rd minute to take the game to extra time and penalties. Jay Gupta missed the crucial penalty and East Bengal lost the match.

==== Group stage ====
Pos	Team	Pld	W	D	L	GF	GA	GD	Pts	Qualification	EAB	NAM	SDC
1	East Bengal	2	2	0	0	6	0	+6	6	Advance to the Final		2–0	4–0
2	Namdhari	2	1	0	1	3	2	+1	3				3–0
3	Sreenidi Deccan	2	0	0	2	0	7	−7	0				

Source: IFA
Legend: Blue = home team win; Yellow = draw; Red = away team win.
Rules for classification: Group stage tiebreakers

==== Matches ====
Win Draw Loss Void

8 October 2025 Group stage	East Bengal	4–0	Sreenidi Deccan	Kalyani
15:00 IST	Gupta 21'; Crespo 38'; Ahadad 48'; Jeakson 51'	AIFF; I-League	Jaydev Sharma (yellow card) 27'	Stadium: Kalyani Stadium; Attendance: 8,000; Referee: Dipu Roy; Man of the Match: Saúl Crespo (East Bengal)

14 October 2025 Group stage	Namdhari	0–2	East Bengal	Kolkata
14:30 IST	Karandeep Singh (yellow card) 40'; Moro (yellow card) 45'; Kamalpreet (yellow card) 55'; Michael Osei (yellow card) 72'; Sehajdeep Singh (yellow card) 90+6'	AIFF; I-League	Rashid 19'; Vishnu 41'; Lalhlansanga (yellow card) 49'; Lalchungnunga (yellow card) 79'	Stadium: Kishore Bharati Krirangan; Attendance: 2,659; Referee: Rohan Das Gupta; Man of the Match: Mohammed Rashid (East Bengal)

18 October 2025 Final	East Bengal	1–1 (a.e.t.) (4–5 p)	Mohun Bagan SG	Kolkata
18:00 IST	Hamid 36'; Lalchungnunga (yellow card) 63'; Mahesh (yellow card) 111'	AIFF; I-League	Apuia 45+3'; Alberto (yellow card) 49'; Robson (yellow card) 91'; Subhasish (yellow card) 109'	Stadium: Salt Lake Stadium; Attendance: 50,236; Referee: Venkatesh R Man of the Match: Naorem Mahesh Singh (East Bengal)
	Penalties
	Miguel (penalty scored); Kevin (penalty scored); Mahesh (penalty scored); Jay (penalty missed); Hiroshi (penalty scored)		(penalty scored) Robson; (penalty scored) Manvir; (penalty scored) Liston; (penalty scored) Petratos; (penalty scored) Mehtab

=== Super Cup ===
East Bengal will participate in the Super Cup and was grouped into Group A alongside Mohun Bagan Super Giants, Chennaiyin and Real Kashmir. However, on 15 October, Real Kashmir withdrew and Dempo were announced as their replacement. East Bengal faced their old rivals Dempo in the opening match of the tournament. Mohamed Ali gave Dempo an early lead in the game. However, East Bengal scored twice in quick succession and took the lead. Laximanrao scored the equaliser for Dempo in the 89th minute as the match ended in a 2–2 draw. On 28 October, East Bengal faced Chennaiyin in a do-or-die match and comfortably won 4–0 with a brace from Bipin Singh and first goals for East Bengal by Kevin and Hiroshi. East Bengal needed a draw against their arch-rivals Mohun Bagan SG in the final match of Group A to qualify for the semi-finals. The match eventually ended in a 0–0 draw despite East Bengal controlling the proceedings for the major part of the game and qualified for semi-finals as Group A toppers. In the semi-final, East Bengal faced Punjab and won comfortably 3–1 with goals from Rashid, Kevin and Saúl thus sealing a spot in the final against Goa.

==== Group stage ====
Pos	Team	Pld	W	D	L	GF	GA	GD	Pts	Qualification	EAB	MBG	DEM	CFC
1	East Bengal	3	1	2	0	6	2	+4	5	Advance to knockout stage		0–0	2–2	4–0
2	Mohun Bagan	3	1	2	0	2	0	+2	5				0–0	2–0
3	Dempo (H)	3	0	3	0	3	3	0	3					1–1
4	Chennaiyin	3	0	1	2	1	7	−6	1					

Source: AIFF
Legend: Blue = home team win; Yellow = draw; Red = away team win.
Rules for classification: 1) points; 2) head-to-head points; 3) head-to-head goal difference; 4) goal difference; 5) number of goals scored; 6) Penalty shoot-out if only two teams are tied and they met in the last round of the group; 7) Disciplinary points; 8) drawing of lots
(H) Hosts

==== Bracket ====
Semifinals
A1	East Bengal	3
C1	Punjab	1
B1	Goa	2
D1	Mumbai City	1

Final
SF1	East Bengal	0 (5)
SF2	Goa (p)	0 (6)

==== Matches ====
Win Draw Loss Void

25 October 2025 Group stage	East Bengal	2–2	Dempo	Bambolim
16:30 IST	Anwar (yellow card) 45+4'; Mahesh 46'; Miguel 57'; Lalchungnunga (yellow card) 59'; Kevin (yellow card) 90+1'	AIFF; I-League	Mohamed 27' (yellow card) 51'; Vinay (yellow card) 66'; Nestor (yellow card) 84' (yellow-red card) 90+4'; Knerkitalang (yellow card) 84'; Laximanrao 89'	Stadium: GMC Athletic Stadium; Attendance: 934; Referee: Ashwin; Man of the Match: Laximanrao Rane (Dempo)

28 October 2025 Group stage	Chennaiyin	0–4	East Bengal	Bambolim
16:30 IST	Jiteshwor (yellow card) 6'; Hnamte (yellow card) 43'; Irfan (yellow card) 55'	AIFF; I-League	Kevin 36'; Bipin 40', 45+1'; Hiroshi 90+4' (pen.)	Stadium: GMC Athletic Stadium; Attendance: 247; Referee: Aditya Purkayastha; Man of the Match: Naorem Mahesh Singh (East Bengal)

31 October 2025^{(KD)} Group stage	Mohun Bagan SG	0–0	East Bengal	Fatorda
19:30 IST	Bose (yellow card) 26'	AIFF; I-League	Mahesh (yellow card) 26'; Miguel (yellow card) 26'; Gupta (yellow card) 62'	Stadium: Fatorda Stadium; Attendance: 1,245; Referee: Harish Kundu; Man of the Match: Alberto Rodríguez (Mohun Bagan SG)

4 December 2025 Semi final	East Bengal	3–1	Punjab	Fatorda
16:00 IST	Rashid 12' (yellow card) 35'; Kevin 45+3'; Saúl 70'	AIFF; I-League	Ramírez 34' (pen.); Pramveer (yellow card) 38'; Prabhu (yellow card) 59'; Nsungusi (yellow card) 75'	Stadium: Fatorda Stadium; Attendance: 300; Referee: Ashwin

7 December 2025 Final	East Bengal	0–0 (a.e.t.) (5–6 p)	Goa	Fatorda
19:30 IST	Rashid (yellow card) 84'; Gill (yellow card) 120'	AIFF; I-League	Boris (yellow card) 6'; Dražić (yellow card) 67'	Stadium: Fatorda Stadium; Attendance: 9,400; Referee: Harish Kundu; Man of the Match: Hrithik Tiwari (Goa)
	Penalties
	Sibille (penalty scored); Saúl (penalty scored); Miguel (penalty scored); Rashid (penalty missed); A. Ali (penalty scored); Ahadad (penalty scored); PV Vishnu (penalty missed)		(penalty missed) Borja; (penalty scored) Siverio; (penalty scored) Dejan; (penalty scored) Nemil; (penalty scored) Timor; (penalty scored) Udanta; (penalty scored) Tavora

=== Indian Super League ===
==== Summary ====
East Bengal confirmed their participation along with the thirteen other teams for the 2025–26 Indian Super League season, which was delayed due to various administrative issue with the AIFF and their exiting commercial partner FSDL. East Bengal would play their home matches at the Salt Lake Stadium in Kolkata.

==== League table ====
Pos	Team	Pld	W	D	L	GF	GA	GD	Pts	Qualification
1	East Bengal (C)	13	7	5	1	30	11	+19	26	Champions and Qualification for the Champions League Two qualifying playoffs (Note: As per Article 4 of entry regulations for AFC’s club competitions, each club needs to play a minimum of 24 matches per season in the domestic top division that runs for at least eight months, to receive direct slots in AFC club competitions. Since Indian clubs will play just 13 games, the ISL winners will enter the qualifying stage of the ACL2 instead of the group stage.)
2	Mohun Bagan	13	7	5	1	23	9	+14	26	
3	Mumbai City	13	7	4	2	17	9	+8	25	
4	Bengaluru	13	6	5	2	18	12	+6	23	
5	Jamshedpur	13	6	4	3	15	10	+5	22 (Note: Head-to-head points: Jamshedpur 3, Punjab 0.)	

Source: Indian Super League
Rules for classification: 1) points; 2) goal difference; 3) number of goals scored; 4) head-to-head points; 5) head-to-head goal difference; 6) head-to-head goals scored; 7) fair play ranking; 8) drawing of lots.
(Note: Head-to-head record is used only after all the matches between the teams in question have been played).
(C) Champions

==== Result summary ====
Overall								Home						Away					
Pld	W	D	L	GF	GA	GD	Pts	W	D	L	GF	GA	GD	W	D	L	GF	GA	GD
13	7	5	1	30	11	+19	26	4	4	1	22	7	+15	3	1	0	8	4	+4

==== Results by match ====
Match	1	2	3	4	5	6	7	8	9	10	11	12	13
Ground	H	H	H	H	H	A	A	H	H	H	A	A	A
Result	W	W	L	D	D	W	W	D	W	W	D	D	W
Position	1	1	3	4	4	4	3	3	4	1	1	1	1

Source: indiansuperleague.com
A = Away; H = Home; W = Win; D = Draw; L = Loss

==== Matches ====
16 February 2026 Round 1	East Bengal	3–0	NorthEast United	Kolkata
19:30 IST	Rashid (yellow card) 53'; Youssef 65', 70'; Edmund (yellow card) 87'; Miguel 90+2'	Report	Jithin (yellow card) 35'; Zabaco (yellow card) 90+6'	Stadium: Salt Lake Stadium; Attendance: 18,636; Referee: Venkatesh R Man of the Match: Youssef Ezzejjari (East Bengal)

21 February 2026 Round 2	East Bengal	4–1	SC Delhi	Kolkata
17:00 IST	Edmund 7'; Youssef 12', 40'; Jay (yellow card) 87'; Miguel 90+5'	Report	Lalrochana 4'; Clarence (yellow card) 11'	Stadium: Salt Lake Stadium; Attendance: 20,386; Referee: Crystal John; Man of the Match: Youssef Ezzejjari (East Bengal)

27 February 2026 Round 3	East Bengal	1–2	Jamshedpur	Kolkata
17:00 IST	Lalchungnunga (yellow card) 17'; Edmund 41'; Miguel (yellow card) 86'	Report	Sanan (yellow card) 2'; Eze 61' (yellow card) 90+1'; Nikhil (yellow card) 71'; Tachikawa 87'	Stadium: Salt Lake Stadium; Attendance: 22,899; Referee: Aditya Purkayastha; Man of the Match: Stephen Eze (Jamshedpur)

5 March 2026 Round 4	East Bengal	0–0	Goa	Kolkata
17:00 IST	Vishnu (yellow card) 90'	Report	Dejan (yellow card) 23'; Ayush (yellow card) 25'; Boris (yellow card) 49'	Stadium: Salt Lake Stadium; Attendance: 12,853; Referee: Lakshay; Man of the Match: Miguel Figueira (East Bengal)

14 March 2026 Round 5	East Bengal	1–1	Kerala Blasters	Kolkata
17:00 IST	Ezzejjari 10' (pen.)	Report	Dohling (yellow card) 10'; Ndiaye (yellow card) 86'; Ajsal 90+6'	Stadium: Salt Lake Stadium; Attendance: 13,379; Referee: Harish Kundu; Man of the Match: Muhammad Ajsal (Kerala Blasters)

23 March 2026 Round 6	East Bengal	7–0	Mohammedan	Kolkata
19:30 IST	Anwar 6', 79'; Ezzejjari 14' (pen.), 55' (pen.); Crespo 38' (pen.); Vishnu 75'; Sekar 90+6'	Report	Joseph Lalmuanawma (yellow card) 33' (yellow-red card) 36'	Stadium: Salt Lake Stadium; Attendance: 11,213; Referee: Crystal John; Man of the Match: Anwar Ali (East Bengal)

11 April 2026 Round 7	Chennaiyin	1–3	East Bengal	Chennai
17:00 IST	Kotal (yellow card) 3'; Yadwad 28'	Report	Lalrindika 7'; Miguel (yellow card) 34'; Sibille (yellow card) 65'; Bipin 83'; Sekar 90+6'	Stadium: Jawaharlal Nehru Stadium; Attendance: 2,947; Referee: Harish Kundu; Man of the Match: Bipin Singh (East Bengal)

16 April 2026 Round 8	East Bengal	3–3	Bengaluru	Kolkata
19:30 IST	Sibille (yellow card) 16'; Souvik Chakrabarti (yellow card) 18'; Anwar 21'; Lalrindika (yellow card) 23'; Miguel (red card) 24'; Crespo 56'; Søjberg 90+7' (yellow card) 90+7'	Report	Bheke (yellow card) 6'; Ashique 12'; Roshan (yellow card) 36'; Suresh 40'; Williams (yellow card) 45+2' (goal) 72'; Soham Varshneya (yellow card) 86'	Stadium: Salt Lake Stadium; Attendance: 13,244; Referee: Ashwin; Man of the Match: Saúl Crespo (East Bengal)

28 April 2026 Round 10	East Bengal	3–0	Odisha	Margao
19:30 IST	Bipin 11'; Crespo (yellow card) 45'; Chakrabarti (yellow card) 52'; Søjberg (yellow card) 57'; Ezzejjari 70', 83'; Gupta (yellow card) 90+4'	Report	Sharma (yellow card) 28'; Thoiba (yellow card) 45+1'	Stadium: Fatorda Stadium; Attendance: 233; Referee: Lakshay; Man of the Match: Bipin Singh (East Bengal)
Note: The home match for East Bengal was shifted to Goa due to elections in West Bengal.

8 May 2026 Round 12	Mumbai City	1–2	East Bengal	Mumbai
19:30 IST	Brandon 8'; Zothanpuia (yellow card) 22'; Rehenesh (yellow card) 37'; Lachenpa (yellow card) 57'	Report	Chakrabarti (yellow card) 51'; Ezzejjari 58' (pen.); Sekar 71'; Vishnu (yellow card) 84'; Gill (yellow card) 88'; Sibille (yellow card) 90+7'	Stadium: Mumbai Football Arena; Attendance: 3,649; Referee: Lakshay; Man of the Match: Kevin Sibille (East Bengal)

11 May 2026 Round 9	East Bengal	0–0	Punjab	Kolkata
19:30 IST	Chakrabarti (yellow card) 15'; Rashid (yellow card) 31'; Miguel (yellow card) 45+1'	Report		Stadium: Salt Lake Stadium; Attendance: 17,435; Referee: Crystal John; Man of the Match: Prabhsukhan Singh Gill (East Bengal)

17 May 2026^{(KD)} Round 11	Mohun Bagan	1–1	East Bengal	Kolkata
19:30 IST	Alberto (yellow card) 25'; Cummings 90'	Report	Gill (yellow card) 59'; Lalrindika 85' (yellow card) 86' (yellow-red card) 90+8'	Stadium: Salt Lake Stadium; Attendance: 62,201; Referee: Venkatesh R. Man of the Match: Miguel Figueira (East Bengal)

21 May 2026 Round 13	Inter Kashi	1–2	East Bengal	Kolkata
19:30 IST	Moya 15'; Passi (yellow card) 54'; Doungel (yellow card) 82'	Report	Gupta (yellow card) 38'; Ezzejjari 50'; Rashid 73'; Gill (yellow card) 82'; Sekar (yellow card) 90+5'	Stadium: Kishore Bharati Krirangan; Attendance: 8,112; Referee: Aditya Purkayastha; Man of the Match: Mohammed Rashid (East Bengal)

=== Calcutta Football League ===
==== Summary ====
East Bengal participated in the 2025 CFL Premier Division and was drawn into group A for the first phase of the tournament where twenty-six teams were divided into two groups of thirteen. East Bengal fielded mostly the reserve squad led by head coach Bino George for the Calcutta Football League like the previous three seasons. East Bengal opened their group stage campaign on 27 June against Measurers Club at the Bankimanjali Stadium in Naihati and won 7–1, repeating the same scoreline from the opening fixture of the previous season. East Bengal qualified for the Super Six stage being the toppers of Group A with 23 points from 11 matches. In the super-six round, East Bengal first defeated United Kolkata 3–0 and then Diamond Harbour 3–1, as East Bengal cruise their way closer to the league championship title. On 22 September, East Bengal faced United SC in the title decider, as a draw would suffice for East Bengal to win the tournament. East Bengal won the match 2–1 and won the Calcutta Football League for the record 41st time.

==== Table ====
Pos	Team	Pld	W	D	L	GF	GA	GD	Pts	Qualification	EAB	SUS	CCU	PAC	PTC	MBG	BSS	KSL	GGT	MEA	KMS	RLY	ARM (Note: Army Red didn't field their team in group stage, thus IFA gave free 3 points to all other teams of Group A with 3–0 victory.)
1	East Bengal	12	8	2	2	33	10	+23	26	Super Six round		1–1	2–2	0–2		3–2		1–0	4–0				
2	Suruchi Sangha	12	7	4	1	27	8	+19	25	Super Six round			2–2	2–2				0–1	3–0	6–0		2–0	3–0
3	Calcutta Customs	12	7	4	1	21	10	+11	25	Super Six round				1–0	3–1		0–0	2–1		1–2			
4	Police AC	12	7	3	2	24	8	+16	24						5–0		4–1			2–1	1–1		3–0
5	Pathachakra	12	6	1	5	15	16	−1	19		1–0	0–1								1–0			3–0

Source: The Away End
Legend: Blue = home team win; Yellow = draw; Red = away team win.
Rules for classification: 1) points; 2) head-to-head points; 3) head-to-head goal difference; 4) goal difference; 5) number of goals scored; 6) drawing of lots

Super Six

Pos	Team	Pld	W	D	L	GF	GA	GD	Pts	Qualification	EAB^{(EAB)}	UTD^{(UTD)}	SUS	DIH^{(DIH)}	UKS	CCU
1	East Bengal^{(ISL)} (C)	3	3	0	0	8	2	+6	9	Champions				3–1	3–0	
2	United SC^{(IL2)}	3	1	1	1	5	4	+1	4		1–2		2–2			
3	Suruchi Sangha (Q)	3	1	1	1	5	6	−1	4	Eligible for I-League 3 (Note: If the top teams are already playing in national leagues, then the next highest ranked team(s) would be eligible for I-League 3.)				0–4		
4	Diamond Harbour^{(IL)}	3	1	0	2	5	5	0	3							0–2
5	United Kolkata (Q)	3	1	0	2	5	6	−1	3	Eligible for I-League 3 (Note: If the top teams are already playing in national leagues, then the next highest ranked team(s) would be eligible for I-League 3.)			0–3			

Source: The Away End
Legend: Blue = home team win; Yellow = draw; Red = away team win.
Rules for classification: 1) points; 2) head-to-head points; 3) head-to-head goal difference; 4) goal difference; 5) number of goals scored; 6) drawing of lots
(C) Champions; (Q) Qualified for the phase indicated

==== Matches ====
Win Draw Loss Void

27 June 2025 1	Measurers Club	1–7	East Bengal	Naihati
15:00 IST	Andy Zakhary Mawthoh 69'	Report	Monotos Maji 23'; Banerjee 35'; Vanlalpeka Guite 38'; Tanmay Das 48'; Suman Dey (yellow card) 50' (goal) 90+4'; Jesin 64', 66'	Stadium: Bankimanjali Stadium; Attendance: 1,593; Referee: Rahul Karmakar; Man of the Match: Jesin (East Bengal)

4 July 2025 2	East Bengal	1–1	Suruchi Sangha	Naihati
17:00 IST	Vanlalpeka Guite 45+1'; Banerjee (yellow card) 60'; Suman Dey (yellow card) 70'	AIFF; I-League	Karmanya Bansal 48'; Bablu Oraon (red card) 70'; Subham Roy (yellow card) 81'; Sk. Golap (yellow card) 90+1'; Seijoseph Haokip (yellow card) 90+5'	Stadium: Bankimanjali Stadium; Attendance: 2000; Referee: Nripen Haldar; Man of the Match: Chaku Mandi (East Bengal)

12 July 2025 4	East Bengal	2–2	Calcutta Customs	Kalyani
15:00 IST	Joseph Justin (yellow card) 35'; Ananthu NS 61'; Provat Lakra 71'; Tanmay Das (yellow card) 90+8'	AIFF; I-League	Shlok Tiwari 18'; Sourav Sen 22'; Zahid Yousif (yellow card) 69'; Arkaprabha Das (yellow card) 90+7'	Stadium: Kalyani Stadium; Attendance: 200; Referee: Surojit Das; Man of the Match: Ricki Gharami (Calcutta Customs)

15 July 2025 5	Pathachakra	1–0	East Bengal	Barrackpore
15:00 IST	David Motla (yellow card) 43', (goal) 87'; Avijit Kar (yellow card) 60'; Shibsankar Kujur (yellow card) 75'	AIFF; I-League	Chaku Mandi (yellow card) 35'; Provat Lakra (yellow card) 90+3'	Stadium: Bibhutibhusan Stadium; Attendance: 700; Referee: Rohan DasGupta

26 July 2025 6	East Bengal	3–2	Mohun Bagan SG	Kalyani
17:30 IST	Jesin 9'; Banerjee 45+6'; Martand (yellow card) 45+7'; Suman (yellow card) 53'; Aman (yellow card) 63' (yellow-red card) 90+8'; Lalhlansanga 69', (yellow card) 70'; Majumder (yellow card) 90+8'	AIFF; I-League	Karan (yellow card) 31'; Deeprobhat (yellow card) 45'; Castanha 53'; Nassiri 67'	Stadium: Kalyani Stadium; Attendance: 14,350; Referee: Aditya Purkayastha; Man of the Match: Sayan Banerjee (East Bengal FC)

29 July 2025 3	BSS Sporting Club	0–6	East Bengal	Barrackpore
15:00 IST	Sourav Ram (yellow card) 43'; Ayan Nag (yellow card) 68'	AIFF; I-League	Chaku Mandi 18'; Lalhlansanga 30'; Muhammed Ashiq S 33'; Shyamal Besra (yellow card) 56'; Naseeb Rahman 72'; Zothanpuia 74'; Vanlalpeka Guite 75'	Stadium: Bibhutibhusan Stadium; Attendance: 500; Referee: Rabin Biswas; Man of the Match: Chaku Mandi (East Bengal)

3 August 2025 7	Police AC	2–0	East Bengal	Barrackpore
15:00 IST	Mohammed Amil Naim 11'; Mrinmoy Mahapatra (yellow card) 46' (goal) 75'	AIFF; I-League	Lakra (yellow card) 31'; Lalhlansanga (yellow card) 48'	Stadium: Bibhutibhusan Stadium; Attendance: 700; Referee: Tarun Kumar Biswas; Man of the Match: Ujjal Howladar (Police AC)

8 August 2025 8	East Bengal	1–0	Kalighat SLA	Naihati
15:00 IST	Majumder (yellow card) 4'; Bikram Pradhan (yellow card) 47'; Vanlalpeka Guite 55'; Muhammed Ashiq (yellow card) 57'; Ajad Saheem (yellow card) 88'	AIFF; I-League	Lenminlun Doungel (yellow card) 21'; Najmul Molla (yellow card) 59'	Stadium: Bankimanjali Stadium; Attendance: 800; Referee: Suvankar Das; Man of the Match: Vanlalpeka Guite (East Bengal)

12 August 2025 9	East Bengal	3–0	Railway FC	Naihati
15:00 IST	Banerjee 25', 28'; Chaku Mandi (yellow card) 59' (yellow-red card) 71'; Naseeb Rahman 90+1'	AIFF; I-League	Sourav Das (yellow card) 53'; Sayan Das (yellow card) 61'; Abhishek Aich (yellow card) 68'; Masum Robbani (yellow card) 68'	Stadium: Bankimanjali Stadium; Attendance: 250; Referee: Sandip Das; Man of the Match: Sayan Banerjee (East Bengal)

26 August 2025 10	East Bengal	4–0	George Telegraph	Barrackpore
15:00 IST	Bikram Pradhan (yellow card) 48'; Lakra (yellow card) 65'; Vishnu 68', 88'; Majumder (yellow card) 71'; Lalhlansanga (penalty missed) 77'; Banerjee 83'; Monotosh Maji 90+3'	AIFF; I-League	Jeet Nandi (yellow card) 71'; Tuhin Dey Talukdar (yellow card) 76'	Stadium: Bibhutibhusan Stadium; Attendance: 450; Referee: Bimalendu Mondal; Man of the Match: P. V. Vishnu (East Bengal)

29 August 2025 11	East Bengal	3–1	Kalighat MS	Naihati
15:00 IST	Lalhlansanga 25'; Guite Vanlalpeka 53'; Majumder (yellow card) 69'; Souvik (yellow card) 82'; Shyamal Besra 88'; Sayan (yellow card) 90'	AIFF; I-League	Samaresh Das (yellow card) 41'; Sahajid Gazi (yellow card) 41'; Devadath S 71' (pen.)	Stadium: Bankimanjali Stadium; Attendance: 300; Referee: Simanta Kahar; Man of the Match: Vanlalpeka Guite (East Bengal)

— 12	East Bengal	3–0 (Note: Walkover)	Army Red
Note: Army Red didn't field their team in group stage, thus IFA gave free 3 points to all other teams of Group A with 3–0 victory.

11 September 2025 Super Six	East Bengal	3–0	United Kolkata	Kolkata
15:00 IST	Chaku Mandi (yellow card) 40'; Naseeb Rahman 45+2'; Vishnu 48'; Vanlalpeka Guite 69'	AIFF; I-League	Murmu (yellow card) 28'; Suvo Biswas (yellow card) 47'; Debayan Hazra (yellow card) 85'	Stadium: East Bengal Ground; Attendance: 2,000; Referee: Rohan Das Gupta; Man of the Match: Provat Lakra (East Bengal)

14 September 2025 Super Six	East Bengal	3–1	Diamond Harbour	Kolkata
15:00 IST	Tanmay Das (yellow card) 5'; Chaku Mandi (yellow card) 13'; Lalhlansanga 27' (yellow card) 56'; Jesin 75', 90+6' (yellow card) 90+7'; Naseeb Rahman (yellow card) 90+5'	AIFF; I-League	Kima (yellow card) 43' (goal) 71'; Suprodip Hazra (yellow card) 90+2'	Stadium: Kishore Bharati Krirangan; Attendance: 1,000; Referee: Surojit Das; Man of the Match: Chaku Mandi (East Bengal)

22 September 2025 Super Six	United Sports	1–2	East Bengal	Kolkata
15:00 IST	Rafique (yellow card) 50'; Susovan Ghosh (yellow card) 70'; Amit Basak 88'	AIFF; I-League	Lalhlansanga 37'; Shyamal Besra 88'	Stadium: East Bengal Ground; Attendance: 5,000; Referee: Rabin Biswas; Man of the Match: Bikram Pradhan (East Bengal)

=== Oil India Challenge Gold Cup ===
East Bengal also participated in the 8th Oil India Challenge Gold Cup held at Duliajan, Assam and fielded mostly their reserve squad for the tournament. East Bengal started the tournament directly from the quarter-final. Oil India scored in the 89th minute and East Bengal suffered a 0–1 loss, thus crashing out of the tournament.

==== Bracket ====
Quarter-finals
24 Oct
Shillong Lajong	3
Assam Police	1
25 Oct
East Bengal II	0
Oil India	1
23 Oct
NorthEast United II	0
United Chirang Duar	4
26 Oct
Diamond Harbour	1
TRAU	0

Semi-finals
27 Oct
Shillong Lajong	1
Oil India	0
28 Oct
United Chirang Duar	1
Diamond Harbour	4

Final
30 Oct
Shillong Lajong	0
Diamond Harbour	2

==== Matches ====
Win Draw Loss Void

25 October 2025 Quarter-final	East Bengal	0–1	Oil India	Duliajan
17:30 IST	Ajad (yellow card) 43'; Sayan (yellow card) 58'	Report	Akrang 89'	Stadium: Nehru Maidan; Attendance: 4,000; Referee: Baju Tussoh; Man of the Match: Akrang Narzary (Oil India)

=== Sikkim Gold Cup ===
East Bengal also participated in the 41st Sikkim Gold Cup held at Paljor Stadium, Gangtok and fielded mostly their reserve squad for the tournament. East Bengal started the tournament directly from the quarter-final.

==== Bracket ====
Pre-Qualifying
(India) Sikkim Brotherhood	1
(India) Sikkim Himalayan	3
(Tibet) Tibetan NFA	0
(India) Sikkim Dragons	4
(India) GTA XI	1
(India) Sikkim Police	3
(India) Services	3
(India) Sikkim Aakraman	0

Pre-Quarter
(India) Rajasthan United	3
(India) Sikkim Himalayan	0
(India) Sikkim Dragons	2
(India) NEROCA	0
(India) Diamond Harbour	3
(India) Sikkim Police	1
(India) Services	1
(India) Sudeva Delhi	0

Quarterfinals
(Nepal) Church Boys United	1
(India) Rajasthan United	3
(India) Sikkim Dragons	2
(India) NorthEast United (R)	1
(India) Inter Kashi	1
(India) Diamond Harbour	3
(India) Services	1
(India) East Bengal (R)	0

Semifinals
(India) Rajasthan United	3
(India) Sikkim Dragons	2
(India) Diamond Harbour	0
(India) Services	2

Final
(India) Rajasthan United	1
(India) Services	0

==== Matches ====
Win Draw Loss Void

25 November 2025 Quarter-final	Services	1–0 (a.e.t.)	East Bengal	Gangtok
16:30 IST	Abhishek Pawar 93'	Report	Joesph Justin (yellow card) 15'; Bikram Pradhan (yellow card) 26' (yellow-red card) 46'; Lalramsanga (yellow card) 60'; Debojit Roy (yellow card) 118'	Stadium: Paljor Stadium

== Statistics ==
=== Appearances ===
Players with no appearances are not included in the list.

As of 21 May 2026

Appearances for East Bengal in 2025–26 season
No.	Pos.	Nat.	Name	Durand Cup		Indian Super League		Super Cup		IFA Shield		Calcutta League		Oil India Gold Cup		Sikkim Gold Cup		Total	
No.	Pos.	Nat.	Name	Apps	Starts	Apps	Starts	Apps	Starts	Apps	Starts	Apps	Starts	Apps	Starts	Apps	Starts	Apps	Starts
Goalkeepers
13	GK	(India)	Prabhsukhan Singh Gill	4	4	13	13	4	4	2	2	—		—		—		23	23
24	GK	(India)	Debjit Majumder	1	1	0	0	1	1	2	1	5	5	—		—		9	8
27	GK	(India)	Aditya Patra	—		—		—		—		5	5	1	1	—		6	6
95	GK	(India)	Gourab Shaw	—		0	0	—		0	0	4	4	—		1	1	5	5
Defenders
3	RB	(India)	Provat Lakra	3	1	0	0	—		—		11	11	—		—		14	12
4	CB	(India)	Anwar Ali	5	5	12	12	5	5	1	1	—		—		—		23	23
5	CB	(India)	Lalchungnunga	4	4	7	5	4	2	3	3	—		—		—		18	14
6	CB	(Argentina)	Kevin Sibille	4	3	7	7	5	5	3	2	—		—		—		19	17
12	RB	(India)	Mohammad Rakip	5	5	11	8	5	5	3	3	—		—		—		24	21
16	CB	(India)	Martand Raina	2	2	2	0	—		1	1	2	2	—		—		7	5
27	LB	(India)	Jay Gupta	—		10	5	5	3	3	2	—		—		—		18	10
54	CB	(India)	Adil Amal	—		—		—		—		0	0	1	0	—		1	0
63	CB	(India)	Monotosh Chakladar	—		—		—		—		3	3	1	1	1	1	5	5
69	LB	(India)	Sonam Tsewang Lhokham	—		—		—		—		1	1	—		1	0	2	1
72	LB	(India)	Bikram Pradhan	—		—		—		0	0	11	10	1	1	1	1	13	12
81	RB	(India)	Suman Dey	0	0	—		—		0	0	7	7	—		1	0	8	7
85	CB	(India)	Chaku Mandi	—		—		—		—		10	8	1	1	1	1	12	10
90	CB	(India)	Justin Joseph	—		0	0	—		—		11	11	—		1	1	12	12
Midfielders
7	LW	(India)	P. V. Vishnu	4	1	13	9	4	0	3	2	6	6	—		—		30	18
8	CM	(Brazil)	Miguel Figueira	4	4	12	11	5	4	3	2	—		—		—		24	21
10	RW	(India)	Edmund Lalrindika	5	4	11	9	4	0	3	1	6	3	—		—		29	17
15	CM	(India)	Naorem Mahesh Singh	5	5	4	1	5	5	1	1	—		—		—		15	12
17	RW	(India)	Jerry Mawihmingthanga	—		2	1	—		—		—		—		—		2	1
21	CM	(Spain)	Saúl Crespo	5	4	7	7	5	5	3	3	—		—		—		20	19
23	CM	(India)	Souvik Chakrabarti	3	0	11	3	1	0	2	0	4	4	—		—		21	7
25	CM	(India)	Jeakson Singh	3	1	13	12	1	0	2	0	—		—		—		19	13
29	LW	(India)	Bipin Singh	5	4	13	13	5	5	3	3	—		—		—		26	25
30	AM	(India)	Vanlalpeka Guite	—		0	0	—		—		14	6	1	0	1	0	16	6
31	AM	(India)	Lalramsanga	—		0	0	—		—		4	1	—		1	1	5	2
53	CM	(India)	Ananthu NS	—		—		—		—		4	1	—		1	0	5	1
58	CM	(India)	Sanjib Ghosh	—		—		—		—		4	2	1	1	—		5	3
61	CM	(India)	Tanmay Das	—		—		—		—		14	13	—		—		14	13
62	CM	(India)	Laikhuram Ricky Singh	—		—		—		—		—		1	0	1	1	2	1
64	CM	(India)	Naseeb Rahman	—		—		—		—		11	10	1	1	—		12	11
66	CM	(India)	Shyamal Besra	—		—		—		—		8	2	1	1	1	1	10	4
68	CM	(India)	Kush Chhetry	—		—		—		—		1	1	—		—		1	1
71	RW	(India)	Muhammed Roshal PP	—		—		—		—		6	2	—		—		6	2
74	CM	(Palestine)	Mohammed Rashid	4	2	12	11	5	5	3	3	—		—		—		24	21
~~75~~	LW	(India)	Aman C. K.	—		—		—		—		10	7	1	0	—		11	7
~~77~~	CM	(India)	Sanjoy Oraw	—		—		—		—		3	0	—		—		3	0
80	AM	(India)	Ajad Saheem T	—		—		—		—		5	1	1	1	—		6	2
83	AM	(India)	Koustav Dutta	—		—		—		—		3	0	—		—		3	0
84	LW	(India)	Sayan Banerjee	—		0	0	—		1	0	12	10	1	1	1	1	15	12
87	RW	(India)	Bijay Murmu	—		—		—		—		4	2	1	1	1	1	6	4
~~88~~	MF	(India)	Mark Zothanpuia	—		—		—		—		3	2	—		—		3	2
Forwards
~~9~~	FW	(Greece)	Dimitrios Diamantakos	4	2	—		—		—		—		—		—		4	2
~~9~~	FW	(Japan)	Hiroshi Ibusuki	—		—		5	3	1	0	—		—		—		6	3
9	FW	(Spain)	Youssef Ezzejjari	—		13	9	—		—		—		—		—		13	9
11	FW	(India)	Nandhakumar Sekar	2	0	10	3	1	0	—		—		—		—		13	3
14	FW	(India)	David Lalhlansanga	4	1	8	0	3	0	2	1	8	8	—		—		25	10
~~17~~	FW	(Morocco)	Hamid Ahadad	3	2	—		4	3	3	2	—		—		—		10	7
52	FW	(India)	Debojit Roy	—		—		—		—		—		—		1	0	1	0
55	FW	(India)	Muhammed Ashiq S	—		—		—		—		4	2	—		—		4	2
56	FW	(India)	Monotos Maji	—		—		—		—		4	1	1	1	—		5	2
59	FW	(India)	Jesin TK	0	0	—		—		1	0	7	1	—		1	1	9	2
70	FW	(India)	Muhammad K Ashique	—		—		—		—		4	2	—		—		4	2
73	FW	(India)	Andrews Albert	—		—		—		—		1	0	—		—		1	0
77	FW	(Denmark)	Anton Søjberg	—		10	4	—		—		—		—		—		10	4

=== Goal scorers ===
As of 21 May 2026

Rank	No.	Pos.	Nat.	Name	Durand Cup	Indian Super League	Super Cup	IFA Shield	Calcutta League	Oil India Gold Cup	Sikkim Gold Cup	Total
1	9	FW	(Spain)	Youssef Ezzejjari	—	11	—	—	—	—	—	11
2	14	FW	(India)	David Lalhlansanga	1	—	0	—	5	—	—	6
2	21	CB	(Spain)	Saúl Crespo	2	2	1	1	—	—	—	6
2	29	LW	(India)	Bipin Singh	2	2	2	0	—	—	—	6
2	30	AM	(India)	Vanlalpeka Guite	—	—	—	—	6	—	—	6
6	4	CB	(India)	Anwar Ali	2	3	0	0	—	—	—	5
6	7	RW	(India)	P. V. Vishnu	0	1	0	1	3	—	—	5
6	59	FW	(India)	Jesin TK	0	—	—	—	5	—	—	5
6	84	RW	(India)	Sayan Banerjee	—	—	—	—	5	—	—	5
10	10	AM	(India)	Edmund Lalrindika	0	4	0	0	0	—	—	4
10	17	FW	(Morocco)	Hamid Ahadad	2	—	0	2	—	—	—	4
10	74	CM	(Palestine)	Mohammed Rashid	1	1	1	1	—	—	—	4
13	8	AM	(Brazil)	Miguel Figueira	0	2	1	0	—	—	—	3
13	9	FW	(Greece)	Dimitrios Diamantakos	3	—	—	—	—	—	—	3
13	11	FW	(India)	Nandhakumar Sekar	0	3	0	0	—	—	—	3
13	64	MF	(India)	Naseeb Rahman	—	—	—	—	3	—	—	3
16	6	CB	(Argentina)	Kevin Sibille	0	—	2	0	—	—	—	2
16	15	CM	(India)	Naorem Mahesh Singh	1	—	1	0	—	—	—	2
16	56	FW	(India)	Monotos Maji	—	—	—	—	2	—	—	2
16	66	MF	(India)	Shyamal Besra	—	—	—	—	2	—	—	2
21	3	RB	(India)	Provat Lakra	0	—	—	—	1	—	—	1
21	5	CB	(India)	Lalchungnunga	1	—	0	0	—	—	—	1
21	9	FW	(Japan)	Hiroshi Ibusuki	—	—	1	0	—	—	—	1
21	25	CM	(India)	Jeakson Singh	0	—	0	1	—	—	—	1
21	27	LB	(India)	Jay Gupta	—	—	0	1	—	—	—	1
21	53	MF	(India)	Ananthu NS	—	—	—	—	1	—	—	1
21	55	FW	(India)	Muhammed Ashiq S	—	—	—	—	1	—	—	1
21	61	MF	(India)	Tanmay Das	—	—	—	—	1	—	—	1
21	77	FW	(Denmark)	Anton Søjberg	—	1	—	—	—	—	—	1
21	81	RB	(India)	Suman Dey	—	—	—	—	1	—	—	1
21	85	CB	(India)	Chaku Mandi	—	—	—	—	1	—	—	1
21	88	CM	(India)	Mark Zothanpuia	0	—	—	—	1	—	—	1
Own Goals					0	0	0	0	0	0	0	0
Total					15	30	9	7	38	0	0	99

=== Assists ===
As of 21 May 2026

Rank	No.	Pos.	Nat.	Name	Durand Cup	Indian Super League	Super Cup	IFA Shield	Calcutta League	Oil India Gold Cup	Sikkim Gold Cup	Total
1	8	CM	(Brazil)	Miguel Figueira	2	5	2	0	—	—	—	9
2	29	LW	(India)	Bipin Singh	1	5	—	2	—	—	—	8
3	7	AM	(India)	P. V. Vishnu	0	3	—	0	4	—	—	7
3	15	FW	(India)	Naorem Mahesh Singh	2	1	3	1	—	—	—	7
5	10	AM	(India)	Edmund Lalrindika	1	1	—	0	2	—	—	4
5	64	CM	(India)	Naseeb Rahman	—	—	—	—	4	—	—	4
6	14	FW	(India)	David Lalhlansanga	0	—	—	1	2	—	—	3
6	30	AM	(India)	Vanlalpeka Guite	—	—	—	—	3	—	—	3
6	75	RW	(India)	Aman C. K.	—	—	—	—	3	—	—	3
10	4	CB	(India)	Anwar Ali	0	2	0	0	—	—	—	2
10	6	CB	(Argentina)	Kevin Sibille	1	1	—	0	—	—	—	2
10	21	CM	(Spain)	Saúl Crespo	0	1	—	1	—	—	—	2
10	66	AM	(India)	Shyamal Besra	—	—	—	—	2	—	—	2
10	84	LW	(India)	Sayan Banerjee	0	—	—	—	2	—	—	2
15	5	CB	(India)	Lalchungnunga	0	—	1	0	—	—	—	1
15	9	FW	(Greece)	Dimitrios Diamantakos	1	—	—	—	—	—	—	1
15	23	CM	(India)	Souvik Chakrabarti	0	1	0	0	—	—	—	1
15	59	FW	(India)	Jesin TK	0	—	—	—	1	—	—	1
15	61	CM	(India)	Tanmay Das	0	—	—	—	1	—	—	1
15	70	LW	(India)	Muhammed Ashique K	—	—	—	—	1	—	—	1
15	74	CM	(Palestine)	Mohammed Rashid	0	1	0	0	—	—	—	1
15	80	AM	(India)	Ajad Saheem T	—	—	—	—	1	—	—	1
15	85	CB	(India)	Chaku Mandi	0	—	—	—	1	—	—	1
Total					8	21	6	5	27	0	0	65

=== Clean sheets ===
As of 21 May 2026

No.	Nat.	Player	Durand Cup	Indian Super League	Super Cup	IFA Shield	Calcutta League	Oil India Gold Cup	Sikkim Gold Cup	Total
13	(India)	Prabhsukhan Singh Gill	1	5	2	1	—	—	—	9
24	(India)	Debjit Majumder	1	0	0	1	2	—	—	4
27	(India)	Aditya Patra	—	—	—	—	0	0	—	0
95	(India)	Gourab Shaw	—	—	—	—	3	—	0	3

=== Disciplinary record ===
As of 21 May 2026

No.	Nat.	Name	Durand Cup				Indian Super League				Super Cup				IFA Shield				Calcutta League			
No.	Nat.	Name	Yellow card	(yellow card) (red card)	(yellow card) (yellow-red card)	Red card	Yellow card	(yellow card) (red card)	(yellow card) (yellow-red card)	Red card	Yellow card	(yellow card) (red card)	(yellow card) (yellow-red card)	Red card	Yellow card	(yellow card) (red card)	(yellow card) (yellow-red card)	Red card	Yellow card	(yellow card) (red card)	(yellow card) (yellow-red card)	Red card
3	(India)	Provat Lakra	1	0	0	0	—				—				—				3	0	0	0
4	(India)	Anwar Ali	0	0	0	0	—				1	0	0	0	0	0	0	0	—			
5	(India)	Lalchungnunga	2	0	0	0	1	0	0	0	1	0	0	0	2	0	0	0	—			
6	(Argentina)	Kevin Sibille	0	0	0	0	3	0	0	0	1	0	0	0	0	0	0	0	—			
7	(India)	P. V. Vishnu	0	0	0	0	1	0	0	0	0	0	0	0	0	0	0	0	0	0	0	0
8	(Brazil)	Miguel Figueira	2	0	0	0	3	0	0	1	1	0	0	0	—				—			
9	(Greece)	Dimitrios Diamantakos	1	0	0	0	—				—				—				—			
10	(India)	Edmund Lalrindika	0	0	0	0	3	0	1	0	0	0	0	0	0	0	0	0	0	0	0	0
11	(India)	Nandhakumar Sekar	—				1	0	0	0	—				—				—			
12	(India)	Mohammad Rakip	1	0	0	0	—				—				—				—			
13	(India)	Prabhsukhan Singh Gill	0	0	0	0	3	0	0	0	1	0	0	0	0	0	0	0	—			
14	(India)	David Lalhlansanga	—				—				—				1	0	0	0	3	0	0	0
15	(India)	Naorem Mahesh Singh	1	0	0	0	—				1	0	0	0	1	0	0	0	—			
16	(India)	Martand Raina	—				—				—				—				1	0	0	0
21	(Spain)	Saúl Crespo	1	0	0	0	1	0	0	0	—				—				—			
23	(India)	Souvik Chakrabarti	1	0	0	0	4	0	0	0	—				—				1	0	0	0
24	(India)	Debjit Majumder	—				—				—				—				4	0	0	0
27	(India)	Jay Gupta	—				3	0	0	0	1	0	0	0	—				—			
55	(India)	Muhammed Ashiq S	—				—				—				—				1	0	0	0
59	(India)	Jesin TK	—				—				—				—				1	0	0	0
61	(India)	Tanmay Das	—				—				—				—				2	0	0	0
64	(India)	Naseeb Rahman	—				—				—				—				1	0	0	0
66	(India)	Shyamal Besra	—				—				—				—				1	0	0	0
72	(India)	Bikram Pradhan	—				—				—				—				2	0	0	0
74	(Palestine)	Mohammed Rashid	0	0	0	0	2	0	0	0	2	0	0	0	0	0	0	0	—			
75	(India)	Aman C. K.	—				—				—				—				1	0	1	0
77	(Denmark)	Anton Søjberg	—				2	0	1	0	—				—				—			
80	(India)	Ajad Saheem T	—				—				—				—				1	0	0	0
81	(India)	Suman Dey	—				—				—				—				3	0	0	0
84	(India)	Sayan Banerjee	—				—				—				—				2	0	0	0
85	(India)	Chaku Mandi	—				—				—				—				4	0	1	0
90	(India)	Justin Joseph	—				—				—				—				1	0	0	0

== See also ==
- 2025–26 in Indian football
- 2025–26 East Bengal FC Women season
