= 2025 IFA Shield =

২০২৫ আইএফএ শিল্ড

Tournament details
- Country: India
- Dates: 8–18 October
- Teams: 6

Final positions
- Champions: Mohun Bagan (21st title)
- Runners-up: East Bengal

Tournament statistics
- Matches played: 7
- Goals scored: 20 (2.86 per match)
- Attendance: 65,880 (9,411 per match)
- Top goal scorer(s): Jamie Maclaren; Hamid Ahadad (2 goals)

The 2025 IFA Shield was the 125th edition of the IFA Shield hosted by the Indian Football Association. The tournament was planned to held in March 2025 but was pushed to October due to clash of fixtures from I-League and Indian Super League.

The tournament will feature domestic teams from the Indian Super League and I-League. At first, international invitees like Paro FC (Bhutan) were invited but later the plan was withdrawn.

Defending champions Real Kashmir were also invited to take part, but they denied. On 3 October, 6 participants were confirmed by IFA.

== Teams ==
Here is the list of confirmed teams:

Locations of 2025 IFA Shield clubs

Club	Location
Indian Super League teams
East Bengal	Kolkata, West Bengal
Mohun Bagan	Kolkata, West Bengal
I-League teams
Gokulam Kerala	Kozhikode, Kerala
Namdhari	Sri Bhaini Sahib, Punjab
Sreenidi Deccan	Hyderabad, Telangana
I-League 2 team
United SC	Kalyani, West Bengal

== Venues ==
- Vivekananda Yuba Bharati Krirangan, Salt Lake City
- Kishore Bharati Krirangan, Santoshpur
- Kalyani Stadium, Kalyani

== Format ==
6 teams will be divided into two groups of 3 teams. After a group stage consisting of single round-robin matches, top teams from each group will qualify for final.

=== Rules ===
- Each team can register 6 foreign players.
- 4 foreign players can play on the field at a time, and 2 can be used as substitutes.

=== Tiebreakers ===
Teams are ranked according to points (3 points for a win, 1 point for a draw, 0 points for a loss), and if tied on points, the following tie-breaking criteria are applied, in the order given, to determine the rankings.

1. Points in head-to-head matches among tied teams;
2. Goal difference in head-to-head matches among tied teams;
3. Goals scored in head-to-head matches among tied teams;
4. If more than two teams are tied, and after applying all head-to-head criteria above, a subset of teams are still tied, all head-to-head criteria above are reapplied exclusively to this subset of teams;
5. Goal difference in all group matches;
6. Goals scored in all group matches;
7. Disciplinary points (yellow card = 1 point, red card as a result of two yellow cards = 3 points, direct red card = 3 points, yellow card followed by direct red card = 4 points);
8. Drawing of lots.

== Group stage ==
=== Group A ===
Pos	Team	Pld	W	D	L	GF	GA	GD	Pts	Qualification	EAB	NAM	SDC
1	East Bengal	2	2	0	0	6	0	+6	6	Advance to the Final		2–0	4–0
2	Namdhari	2	1	0	1	3	2	+1	3				3–0
3	Sreenidi Deccan	2	0	0	2	0	7	−7	0				

Source: IFA
Legend: Blue = home team win; Yellow = draw; Red = away team win.
Rules for classification: Group stage tiebreakers
8 October 2025
15:00 IST

East Bengal	4–0	Sreenidi Deccan
Gupta 21'; Crespo 38'; Ahadad 48'; Thounaojam 51'	AIFF; I-League; PDF Report

Kalyani Stadium, Kalyani
Attendance: 8,000
Referee: Dipu Roy
Man of the Match: Saúl Crespo (East Bengal)

11 October 2025
14:30 IST

Sreenidi Deccan	0–3	Namdhari
	AIFF; I-League; PDF Report	Moro 9'; Gomes 11'; B. Singh 39'

Kishore Bharati Krirangan, Kolkata (Note: At first the venue was announced as Kalyani Stadium, but IFA later changed it to Kishore Bharati Krirangan.)
Attendance: 150
Referee: Tanumoy Sarkar
Man of the Match: Moro Lamine (Namdhari)

14 October 2025
14:30 IST

Namdhari	0–2	East Bengal
	AIFF; I-League; PDF Report	Rashid 19'; PV Vishnu 41'

Kishore Bharati Krirangan, Kolkata
Attendance: 2,659
Referee: Rohan Das Gupta
Man of the Match: Mohammed Rashid (East Bengal)

=== Group B ===
Pos	Team	Pld	W	D	L	GF	GA	GD	Pts	Qualification	MBG	USC	GOK
1	Mohun Bagan	2	2	0	0	7	1	+6	6	Advance to the Final		2–0	5–1
2	United SC	2	1	0	1	1	2	−1	3				1–0
3	Gokulam Kerala	2	0	0	2	1	6	−5	0				

Source: IFA
Legend: Blue = home team win; Yellow = draw; Red = away team win.
Rules for classification: Group stage tiebreakers
9 October 2025
15:00 IST

Gokulam Kerala	1–5	Mohun Bagan
Apuia 48' (o.g.)	AIFF; I-League; PDF Report	Rishad 11' (o.g.); Maclaren 27', 75'; Rodríguez 51'; Robson 54'

Kishore Bharati Krirangan, Kolkata
Attendance: 1,400
Referee: Surojit Das
Man of the Match: Jamie Maclaren (Mohun Bagan)

12 October 2025
14:30 IST

United SC	1–0	Gokulam Kerala
Amit Basak 54'	AIFF; I-League; PDF Report

Kalyani Stadium, Kalyani
Attendance: 768
Referee: Pratik Mondal
Man of the Match: Amit Basak (United SC)

15 October 2025
14:30 IST

Mohun Bagan	2–0	United SC
Petratos 45'; Cummings 49'	AIFF; I-League; PDF Report

Kishore Bharati Krirangan, Kolkata
Attendance: 2,667
Referee: Mithun Kumar Kundu
Man of the Match: Robson (Mohun Bagan)

== Final ==
The group toppers will qualify for the final directly. The match is going to be held on 18 October 2025 at Vivekananda Yuba Bharati Krirangan.

=== Match ===
18 October 2025
18:00 IST

Mohun Bagan	1–1 (a.e.t.)	East Bengal
Cummings (penalty missed) 34'; Apuia 45+3'	AIFF; I-League; PDF Report	Hamid 36'
Penalties
(penalty scored) Robson; (penalty scored) Manvir; (penalty scored) Liston; (penalty scored) Petratos; (penalty scored) Mehtab	5–4	(penalty scored) Miguel; (penalty scored) Sibille; (penalty scored) Mahesh; (penalty missed) Jay; (penalty scored) Ibusuki

Vivekananda Yuba Bharati Krirangan, Kolkata
Attendance: 50,236
Referee: Venkatesh Ramachadran
Man of the Match: Naorem Mahesh (East Bengal)

Mohun Bagan	East Bengal

GK	1	(India) Vishal Kaith
DF	15	(India) Subhasish Bose
DF	5	(Scotland) Tom Aldred
DF	55	(India) Mehtab Singh
MF	17	(India) Liston Colaco
DF	21	(Spain) Alberto Rodríguez
MF	45	(India) Apuia
MF	11	(India) Manvir Singh
MF	6	(India) Anirudh Thapa
FW	35	(Australia) Jason Cummings
FW	29	(Australia) Jamie Maclaren
Substitutes:
DF	27	(India) Abhishek Singh
DF	32	(India) Dippendu Biswas
DF	44	(India) Asish Rai
MF	10	(Brazil) Robson Robinho
MF	22	(India) Deepak Tangri
MF	9	(Australia) Dimitri Petratos
MF	11	(India) Manvir Singh
GK	24	(India) Zahid Hussain
MF	16	(India) Abhishek Suryavanshi
FW	72	(India) Suhail Bhat
Head coach:
(Spain) Jose Francisco Molina

GK	13	(India) Prabhsukhan Gill
DF	5	(India) Lalchungnunga
DF	4	(India) Anwar Ali
DF	12	(India) Mohammad Rakip
DF	6	(Argentina) Kevin Sibille
MF	74	(Palestine) Mohammed Rashid
MF	21	(Spain) Saúl Crespo
FW	15	(India) Naorem Mahesh
FW	17	(Morocco) Hamid Ahadad
FW	29	(India) Bipin Singh
FW	10	(India) Edmund Lalrindika
Substitutes:
GK	24	(India) Debjit Majumder
MF	23	(India) Souvik Chakrabarti
MF	25	(India) Jeakson Singh
DF	16	(India) Martand Raina
MF	8	(Brazil) Miguel Figueira
FW	9	(Japan) Hiroshi Ibusuki
FW	82	(India) PV Vishnu
FW	14	(India) Lalhlansanga
DF	27	(India) Jay Gupta
FW	84	(India) Sayan Banerjee
Head coach:
(Spain) Oscar Bruzon

Player of the Match

- Naorem Mahesh
  (East Bengal)

Match rules

- 90 minutes.
- 30 minutes of extra time if necessary.
- Penalty shoot-out if scores still level.
- Ten named substitutes.
- Maximum of five substitutions.

== Statistics ==
=== Goalscorers ===
As of 18 October 2025

Rank	Player	Club	Goals
1	(Morocco) Hamid Ahadad	East Bengal	2
1	(Australia) Jamie Maclaren	Mohun Bagan	2
2	(India) Jay Gupta	East Bengal	1
2	(India) Jeakson Singh	East Bengal	1
2	(Palestine) Mohammed Rashid	East Bengal	1
2	(India) PV Vishnu	East Bengal	1
2	(Spain) Saúl Crespo	East Bengal	1
2	(Spain) Alberto Rodríguez	Mohun Bagan	1
2	(India) Apuia	Mohun Bagan	1
2	(Australia) Dimi Petratos	Mohun Bagan	1
2	(Australia) Jason Cummings	Mohun Bagan	1
2	(Brazil) Robson Robinho	Mohun Bagan	1
2	(India) Bhupinder Singh	Namdhari	1
2	(Brazil) Guilherme Gomes	Namdhari	1
2	(Ghana) Lamine Moro	Namdhari	1
2	(India) Amit Basak	United SC	1
Own Goal(s)			2
Total			18

=== Clean sheets ===
As of 18 October 2025

Rank	Player	Club	Clean Sheets
1	(India) Debjit Majumder	East Bengal	1
1	(India) Niraj Kumar Singh	Namdhari	1
1	(India) Prabhsukhan Singh Gill	East Bengal	1
1	(India) Suraj Ali	United SC	1
1	(India) Syed Zahid Hussain	Mohun Bagan	1

== Prize money ==
Place	Prize money (₹)
Champions	₹5 lakh
Runners-up	₹3 lakh

== Broadcasting ==
All matches were broadcast on a virtual platform of Shrachi Sports Entertainment Network (SSEN) app. No television broadcasting was done.

== See also ==
- 2025 CFL Premier Division
- 2025 Bengal Super League
- 2025–26 AIFF Super Cup
