= 2022–23 Bashundhara Kings season =

Bashundhara Kings 2022–23 football season

Bashundhara Kings
2022–23 season
- Owner: Bashundhara Group
- President: Imrul Hassan
- Head coach: Óscar Bruzón
- Stadium: Bashundhara Kings Arena
- Bangladesh Premier League: 1st
- Bangladesh Federation Cup: Third Place
- Independence Cup: Winners
- Top goalscorer: League: (Brazil) Dorielton (20 goals); All: (Brazil) Dorielton (33 goals)
- Biggest win: 14–0 Vs Fakirerpool YMC (14 November 2022)
Home colours	Away colours

The 2022–23 season was the Bashundhara Kings's 10th competitive professional season since its creation in 2013, and 5th consecutive season in the Bangladesh Premier League, the country's top-tier football league. In addition to the domestic league, Bashundhara Kings participated in this season's edition of the Federation Cup and Independence Cup. This season covered the period from October 2022 to 22 July 2023. This season didn't include any AFC competitions, as the Asian club competitions switched to a two-year (autumn-to-spring) schedule from 2023.

== Players ==
As of 1 July 2023

No.	Nat.	Player	Position(s)	Date of birth	Year signed	Previous club
Goalkeepers
1	(Bangladesh)	Anisur Rahman Zico (3rd captain)	GK	10 August 1997 (age 29)	2018	(Bangladesh) Saif Sporting Club
22	(Bangladesh)	Sultan Ahmed Sakhil	GK	14 September 1990 (age 36)	2021	(Bangladesh) Abahani Ltd. Dhaka
27	(Bangladesh)	Mehedi Hasan	GK	2 January 2004 (age 22)	2020	Youth team
30	(Bangladesh)	SK Saiful Islam	GK	3 March 1992 (age 34)	2023	(Bangladesh) Chittagong Abahani
36	(Bangladesh)	Hamidur Rahman Remon	GK	20 October 1990 (age 36)	2019	(Bangladesh) Rahmatganj MFS
42	(Bangladesh)	Darius Faris Rahman	GK		2023	(Finland) FC LaPa
Defenders
2	(Bangladesh)	Yeasin Arafat	LB	5 January 2003 (age 23)	2021	(Bangladesh) Saif Sporting Club
3	(Iran)	Mohammad Reza Khanzadeh	CB	11 May 1991 (age 35)	2022	(Iran) Gol Gohar Sirjan
4	(Bangladesh)	Topu Barman (captain)	CB	20 December 1994 (age 31)	2019	(Bangladesh) Abahani Ltd. Dhaka
5	(Bangladesh)	Tutul Hossain Badsha	CB	20 August 1999 (age 27)	2022	(Bangladesh) Abahani Ltd. Dhaka
12	(Bangladesh)	Bishwanath Ghosh	RB	30 May 1999 (age 27)	2019	(Bangladesh) Sheikh Russel KC
22	(Bangladesh)	Md Saad Uddin	RB/RM/RW	1 September 1998 (age 28)	2022	(Bangladesh) Sheikh Russel KC
40	(Bangladesh)	Tariq Kazi	RWB/LWB/CB	6 October 2000 (age 26)	2019	(Finland) Ilves
66	(Bangladesh)	Mahamudul Hasan Kiron	RB	1 September 2001 (age 25)	2022	(Bangladesh) Rahmatganj MFS
71	(Bangladesh)	Rimon Hossain	LB/LM	1 July 2005 (age 21)	2019	(Bangladesh) Arambagh FA
Midfielders
7	(Bangladesh)	Masuk Mia Jony	DM/CM	16 January 1998 (age 28)	2018	(Bangladesh) Saif Sporting Club
13	(Bangladesh)	Atiqur Rahman Fahad	DM	15 September 1995 (age 31)	2019	(Bangladesh) Abahani Ltd. Dhaka
15	(Bangladesh)	Biplu Ahmed	AM/RW	5 May 1999 (age 27)	2019	(Bangladesh) Sheikh Russel KC
17	(Bangladesh)	Sohel Rana	CM/DM/AM	27 March 1995 (age 31)	2021	(Bangladesh) Abahani Ltd. Dhaka
24	(Brazil)	Miguel Figueira	AM	22 April 2000 (age 26)	2022	(Brazil) Goias
33	(Bangladesh)	Shekh Morsalin	CM/AM	25 November 2005 (age 20)	2021	(Bangladesh) Alamgir Somaj Kollayan KS
52	(Bangladesh)	Md Sabbir Hossain	AM	28 June 2003 (age 23)	2022	(Bangladesh) Swadhinata KS
77	(Uzbekistan)	Asror Gofurov	AM/RW	30 January 1995 (age 31)	2022	(Bangladesh) Saif Sporting Club
Forwards
9	(Brazil)	Dorielton	CF	7 March 1990 (age 36)	2022	(Bangladesh) Abahani Ltd. Dhaka
10	(Brazil)	Robinho (vice-captain)	LW/RW/AM	21 July 1995 (age 31)	2020	(Brazil) Fluminense FC
11	(Bangladesh)	Tawhidul Alam Sabuz	CF/SS	14 September 1990 (age 36)	2018	(Bangladesh) Saif Sporting Club
20	(Bangladesh)	Rakib Hossain	RW/SS	18 November 1998 (age 27)	2022	(Bangladesh) Abahani Ltd. Dhaka
29	(Bangladesh)	Motin Mia	CF/RW/SS	20 December 1998 (age 27)	2018	(Bangladesh) Saif Sporting Club
99	(Bangladesh)	Sumon Reza	CF/SS	15 June 1995 (age 31)	2021	(Bangladesh) Uttar Baridhara Club

== Pre-season friendly ==
4 November 2022 Friendly	Bangladesh Police FC	0–2	Bashundhara Kings	Dhaka
14:00			Dorielton 16', 33'	Stadium: Bashundhara Kings Arena

== Transfer ==
=== In ===
No.	Pos	Player	Previous club	Fee	Date	Source
	MF	(Bangladesh) Tutul Hossain Badsha	(Bangladesh) Abahani Limited Dhaka	Free transfer	6 August 2022	
	FW	(Brazil) Dorielton Gomez Nascimento	(Bangladesh) Bashundhara Kings	Free transfer	7 August 2022	
	MF	(Bangladesh) Md Saad Uddin	(Bangladesh) Sheikh Russel KC	Free transfer	26 August 2022	
	DF	(Iran) Reza Khanzadeh	(Iran) Gol Gohar Sirjan	Free transfer	8 October 2022	
77	MF	(Uzbekistan) Asror Gafurov	(Bangladesh) Saif Sporting Club	Free transfer	8 October 2022	

=== Out ===
No.	Pos	Player	Moved to	Fee	Date	Source
	MF	(Bangladesh) Fahim Morshed	Bangladesh Police FC	Free transfer	4 August 2022	
	FW	(Bangladesh) Eleta Kingsley	(Bangladesh) Abahani Limited Dhaka	Free transfer	7 August 2022	
	MF	(Bangladesh) Alamgir Kabir Rana	(Bangladesh) Mohammedan SC	Free transfer	23 August 2022	
	FW	(Spain) Nuha Marong	(India) Rajasthan United FC	Free transfer	4 October 2022	
	FW	(Bosnia and Herzegovina) Stojan Vranjes	(Bosnia and Herzegovina) FK Sloboda Tuzla	Free transfer	1 September 2022	
3	DF	(Iran) Reza Khanzadeh	(Iran) Malavan F.C.	Free transfer	10 July 2023	

== Competitions ==
Win Draw Loss Fixtures

=== Overall ===
Competition	First match	Last match	Final Position
BPL	9 December 2022	14 July 2023	Winners
Federation Cup	27 December 2022	23 May 2023	Third place
Independence Cup	14 November 2022	5 December 2022	Champions

=== Overview ===
Competition	Record							
Competition	Pld	W	D	L	GF	GA	GD	Win %
BPL	20	18	1	1	51	13	+38	90.00
Independence Cup	6	6	0	0	26	3	+23	100.00
Federation Cup	6	5	0	1	14	7	+7	83.33
Total	32	29	1	2	91	23	+68	90.63

Source: Competitions

=== Premier League ===
==== League table ====
Pos	Team	Pld	W	D	L	GF	GA	GD	Pts	Qualification or relegation
1	Bashundhara Kings (C, Q)	20	18	1	1	51	13	+38	55	Qualification for the AFC Challenge League play-off round
2	Dhaka Abahani	20	12	4	4	45	18	+27	40	
3	Bangladesh Police FC	20	10	5	5	39	21	+18	35	
4	Mohammedan SC	20	9	5	6	38	21	+17	32	
5	Sheikh Russel KC	20	8	6	6	33	30	+3	30	

Source: Soccerway
Rules for classification: 1) Points; 2) Goal difference; 3) Goals scored.
(C) Champion; (Q) Qualify for the AFC competition

==== Results summary ====
Overall								Home						Away					
Pld	W	D	L	GF	GA	GD	Pts	W	D	L	GF	GA	GD	W	D	L	GF	GA	GD
20	18	1	1	51	13	+38	55	10	0	0	25	3	+22	8	1	1	26	10	+16

Source: Soccerway

==== Results by round ====
Round	1	2	3	4	5	6	7	8	9	10	11	12	13	14	15	16	17	18	19	20	21
Ground	H	A	H	A	H	A	H	A	H	A	(Note: No Bashundhara Kings matchday in this round.)	A	H	A	H	A	H	A	H	A	H
Result	W	W	W	W	W	W	W	W	W	W	–	D	W	W	W	L	W	W	W	W	W
Position	1	1	1	1	1	1	1	1	1	1	1	1	1	1	1	1	1	1	1	1	1

Source: Matches
A = Away; H = Home; W = Win; D = Draw; L = Loss; P = Postponed

=== Matches ===
9 December 2022 1	Bashundhara Kings	3–0	AFC Uttara	Dhaka
14:30 BST (UTC+6)	Robinho 4'; Dorielton 19'; Rakib 38'; Rimon (yellow card) 38'; Morsalin (yellow card) 90+5'	Report	S. Bepari (yellow card) 36'	Stadium: Bashundhara Kings Arena; Referee: Md Alamgir Sarkar

23 December 2022 2	Fortis FC	0–2	Bashundhara Kings	Rajshahi
14:30 BST (UTC+6)		Report	Tariq (yellow card) 40'; Figueira 45+3'; Mohamed Ariful Islm 51' (o.g.)	Stadium: Rajshahi District Stadium; Referee: Bhubon Mohon Tarafder

31 December 2022 3	Bashundhara Kings	2–0	Rahmatganj MFS	Dhaka
14:30 BST (UTC+6)	Dorielton 11'; Rakib (yellow card) 47'; Tutul (yellow card) 51'; Robinho 60'	Report	Akkas Ali (yellow card) 43'; Jhoaho Hinestroza (yellow card) 51'; Mohamed Tanvir Hossain (yellow card) 88'; Shokhrukhbek Kholmatov (yellow card) 90+4'	Stadium: Bashundhara Kings Arena; Referee: Mohammed Nasiruddin

6 January 2023 4	Muktijoddha Sangsad KC	1–3	Bashundhara Kings	Gopalganj
14:45 BST (UTC+6)	Ndikumana 10'; Mohammad Roman (yellow card) 24'	Report	Dorielton 35', 45+2'; Motin 88'	Stadium: Sheikh Fazlul Haque Mani Stadium; Referee: Mohan Bhaban

13 January 2023 5	Bashundhara Kings	1–0	Bangladesh Police FC	Dhaka
14:45 BST (UTC+6)	Saad (yellow card) 22'; Dorielton 28'; Sohel (yellow card) 30' (yellow-red card) 76'; Rimon (yellow card) 71'	Report	Robiul (yellow card) 6'	Stadium: Bashundhara Kings Arena; Referee: Jasim Akther

21 January 2023 6	Chittagong Abahani	0–3	Bashundhara Kings	Munshigonj
15:00 BST (UTC+6)	Shaker Ullah (yellow card) 49'; Ifeagwu Ojukwu David (yellow card) 58'	Report	Rakib 4'; Dorielton 11'; Robinho (yellow card) 49'; Saad (yellow card) 50'; Yeasin 71'	Stadium: Shaheed Bir Sreshtho Flight Lt. Matiur Rahman Stadium; Referee: Mohammed Jalaluddin

28 January 2023 7	Bashundhara Kings	3–1	Sheikh Russel KC	Dhaka
15:00 BST (UTC+6)	Tutul (yellow card) 28'; Reza Khanzadeh (yellow card) 57'; Robinho 65' (pen.), 90+7' (yellow card) 90+4'; Dorielton (yellow card) 72'; Asror Gafurov 73'	Report	Jamal (yellow card) 63'; Monir Alam (yellow card) 64'; Mfon 82' (yellow card) 90'; Brossou (yellow card) 90+6'	Stadium: Bashundhara Kings Arena; Referee: Nasir Uddin

3 February 2023 8	Dhaka Mohammedan	0–1	Bashundhara Kings	Cumilla
15:45 BST (UTC+6)		Report	Rakib (yellow card) 33'; Robinho (yellow card) 45'; Fahad (yellow card) 45+6'; Dorielton (yellow card) 67' (goal) 90+6'	Stadium: Shaheed Dhirendranath Datta Stadium; Referee: Md Alamgir Sarker

11 February 2023 9	Bashundhara Kings	3–0	Sheikh Jamal DC	Dhaka
15:45 BST (UTC+6)	Asror Gafurov 37'; Dorielton 60', 74'; Rimon (yellow card) 61'	Report	Sohanur Rahman (yellow card) 52'; Otabek Valizhonov (yellow card) 58'	Stadium: Bashundhara Kings Arena; Referee: Md Anisur Rahman Sagor

17 February 2023 10	Dhaka Abahani	1–2	Bashundhara Kings	Comilla
15:45 BST (UTC+6)	Nworah (yellow card) 12'; Rezaul 37' (yellow card) 59'	Report	Tariq (yellow card) 17'; Figueira 26', 77' (yellow card) 90+3'; Asror Gafurov (yellow card) 73'	Stadium: Shaheed Dhirendranath Datta Stadium; Referee: Pema Tshewang (Bhutan)

7 April 2023 12	AFC Uttara	1–1	Bashundhara Kings	Mymensingh
15:45 BST (UTC+6)	Sarower Zaman Nipu (yellow card) 8'; Sajon Mia (yellow card) 45+5'; Rayhan Ahmed (yellow card) 56'; Mohammad Abdullah Tofel (yellow card) 56'; Sakib Bepari 90+6' (yellow card) 90+7'	Report	Masuk (yellow card) 48'; Robinho 57'; Tariq (yellow card) 63'; Saad (yellow card) 67'	Stadium: Rafiq Uddin Bhuiyan Stadium; Referee: Md Saymoon Hasan Sany

15 April 2023 13	Bashundhara Kings	4–1	Fortis FC	Dhaka
15:45 BST (UTC+6)	Robinho 33', 45+3'; Figueira (yellow card) 57'; Dorielton 59', 70'; Yeasin (yellow card) 83'	Report	Abdullah Omar Sajib (yellow card) 17'; Sahin Mia (yellow card) 32'; Borhan Uddin (yellow card) 45+6'; Garcia Joof 90+3'	Stadium: Bashundhara Kings Arena; Referee: Md Nasir Uddin

28 April 2023 14	Rahmatganj MFS	0–4	Bashundhara Kings	Munshigonj
15:45 BST (UTC+6)	Fatkhulloyev (yellow card) 58'; Mohamed Tanvir Hossain (yellow card) 80'	Report	Robinho (penalty missed) 6' 10'; Asror Gafurov 30'; Figueira 45', 90+1'	Stadium: Shaheed Bir Sreshtho Flight Lt. Matiur Rahman Stadium; Referee: Md Alamgir Sarkar

5 May 2023 15	Bashundhara Kings	4–0	Muktijoddha Sangsad KC	Dhaka
16:00 BST (UTC+6)	Figueira 42', 80'; Dorielton 52', 76'	Report	Alfaj Miah (yellow card) 18'	Stadium: Bashundhara Kings Arena; Referee: Bhubon Mohon Tarafder

12 May 2023 16	Bangladesh Police FC	2–1	Bashundhara Kings	Mymensingh
16:00 BST (UTC+6)	Monaem (yellow card) 11'; Edward Morillo 32', 62'; Robiul (yellow card) 89'; Syed Shah Quazem Kirmane (yellow card) 90+3'	Report	Rakib (yellow card) 9' (goal) 47'	Stadium: Rafiq Uddin Bhuiyan Stadium; Attendance: 2,012; Referee: Md Anisur Rahman Sagor; Man of the Match: Edward Morillo

19 May 2023 17	Bashundhara Kings	2–0	Chittagong Abahani	Dhaka
16:00 BST (UTC+6)	Tariq (yellow card) 12'; Figueira 18' (pen.) (yellow card) 30'; Sohel (yellow card) 45+4'; Dorielton 51'; Robinho (penalty missed) 61'	Report	Ekbal Hossain (yellow card) 13'; Forhad Mia (yellow card) 17' (yellow-red card) 18'; Ifegwu (yellow card) 55'; Mohamed Rockey (yellow card) 73'	Stadium: Bashundhara Kings Arena; Referee: Saymoon Hasan Sany

26 May 2023 18	Sheikh Russel KC	4-6	Bashundhara Kings	Dhaka
16:00 BST (UTC+6)	Sujon Biswas 26'; Dipok Roy 38'; Kenneth 69', 90' (pen.)	Report	Dorielton 6', 50', 65', 76'; Robinho 45+3'; Morsalin 45+5', (yellow card) 40+6'; Badsha (yellow card) 89'	Stadium: Bashundhara Kings Arena; Referee: Md Alamgir Sarker; Man of the Match: Dorielton

2 June 2023 19	Bashundhara Kings	2–1	Dhaka Mohammedan	Dhaka
16:00 BST (UTC+6)	Figueira 10' (yellow card) 45+3'; Rakib 40' (yellow card) 70'; Mahmudul Hasan Kiron (yellow card) 73'; Sohel (yellow card) 87'; Bishwanath (yellow card) 90+1'	Report	Emmanuel 2'; Muzaffar Muzaffarov (red card) 86'	Stadium: Bashundhara Kings Arena; Attendance: 9,474; Referee: Md Anisur Rahman Sagor

7 July 2023 20	Sheikh Jamal DC	1–3	Bashundhara Kings	Gopalganj
16:00 BST (UTC+6)	Abu Shaeid 90'	Report	Figueira 4'; Dorielton 42'; Topu (yellow card) 45+2'; Md Sabbir Hossen (yellow card) 53'; Morsalin (yellow card) 72'; Robinho 77' (pen.)	Stadium: Sheikh Fazlul Haque Mani Stadium; Referee: Md Nasiruddin

14 July 2023 21	Bashundhara Kings	1–0	Dhaka Abahani	Dhaka
16:00 BST (UTC+6)	Dorielton 21'; Tripura (yellow card) 33'; Badsha (yellow card) 45+4'; Bishwanath (yellow card) 50'; Rakib (yellow card) 70'	Report	Sohel (yellow card) 27'; Fahim (yellow card) 41'; Colindres (yellow card) 54'	Stadium: Bashundhara Kings Arena; Attendance: 12,125; Referee: Md Alamgir Sarkar

=== Federation Cup ===
==== Group stage ====
Pos	Team	Pld	W	D	L	GF	GA	GD	Pts	Qualification
1	Bashundhara Kings	3	3	0	0	8	3	+5	9	Advance to knockout phase
2	Chittagong Abahani	3	1	1	1	1	2	−1	4	Advance to knockout phase
3	Muktijoddha Sangsad KC	3	1	0	2	5	6	−1	3	Advance to knockout phase
4	Fortis FC	3	0	1	2	1	4	−3	1	

Source: Footystats
Rules for classification: Group stage tiebreakers

27 December 2022	Bashundhara Kings	2–0	Fortis FC	Munshigonj
14:30 BST (UTC+6)	Rimon (yellow card) 22'; Asror Gafurov 53', 94'; Mahmudul Hasan Kiron (yellow card) 80'	Report	Shahdat Hossain Manik (yellow card) 3'	Stadium: Shaheed Bir Sreshtho Flight Lt. Matiur Rahman Stadium; Referee: Md Nasir Uddin

17 January 2023	Bashundhara Kings	4–3	Muktijoddha Sangsad KC	Gopalganj
15:00 BST (UTC+6)	Robinho 15'; Asror Gafurov 36'; Sumon (yellow card) 22' (goal) 49'; Dorielton 82'	Report	Emmanuel 38', 90' (pen.); Saidul Haque (yellow card) 15'; Ndikumana 87'	Stadium: Sheikh Fazlul Haque Mani Stadium; Referee: Md Alamgir Sarkar

7 February 2023	Bashundhara Kings	2–0	Chittagong Abahani	Cumilla
15:15 BST (UTC+6)	Topu (yellow card) 34' (goal) 40'; Miguel 55' (pen.); Fahim Morshed (yellow card) 67'	Report		Stadium: Shaheed Dhirendranath Datta Stadium; Referee: Bhubon Mohon Tarofder

==== Knockout stages ====
4 April 2023 Quarter-finals	Bashundhara Kings	3–1	Muktijoddha Sangsad KC	Munshigonj
15:15 BST (UTC+6)	Dorielton 42', 79'; Robinho (yellow card) 18' (goal) 81'	Report	Emmanuel 34'; Md Roman (yellow card) 39'; Bishal Das (yellow card) 87'	Stadium: Shaheed Bir Sreshtho Flight Lt. Matiur Rahman Stadium; Referee: Md Anisur Rahman Sagor

9 May 2023 Semi-finals	Bashundhara Kings	1–2	Dhaka Mohammedan	Gopalganj
15:15 BST (UTC+6)	Dorielton 43'; Asror Gafurov (yellow card) 78'; Bishwanath (yellow card) 84'	Report	Emmanuel 3'; Diabate 55'	Stadium: Sheikh Fazlul Haque Mani Stadium; Referee: Bhubon Mohon Tarafder

23 May 2023 Third-place	Bashundhara Kings	2–1	Sheikh Russel KC	Dhaka
15:15 BST (UTC+6)	Mohammed Khalekuzzaman Sabuj 85' (o.g.); Figueira 90+1'	Report	Brossou 7'; Mohiuddin Mahi (yellow card) 54'; Robiul Alam (yellow card) 80'	Stadium: Bashundhara Kings Arena; Referee: Md Nasir Uddin

=== Independence Cup ===
==== Group stage ====
Pos	Team	Pld	W	D	L	GF	GA	GD	Pts	Qualification
1	Bashundhara Kings (C)	3	3	0	0	19	0	+19	9	Advance to Knockout stage
2	Chittagong Abahani	3	2	0	1	6	3	+3	6	Advance to Knockout stage
3	Fakirerpool YMC	3	1	0	2	3	19	−16	3	
4	AFC Uttara	3	0	0	3	2	8	−6	0	

Source: GSA
(C) Champions

14 November 2022	Bashundhara Kings	14–0	Fakirerpool YMC	Comilla
14:00 BST (UTC+6)	Biplu 6'; Tariq 10'; Robinho 12', 24', 61'; Miguel 21'; Dorielton 27', 44', 48', 84', 85', 90'; Jony 67'; Yeasin 68'	Report		Stadium: Comilla District Stadium; Referee: Md Nasiruddin

18 November 2022	AFC Uttara	0–3	Bashundhara Kings	Gopalganj
14:00 BST (UTC+6)		Report	Rakib 11'; Dorielton 57' (pen.), 90+1'	Stadium: Sheikh Fazlul Haque Mani Stadium; Referee: Md Anisur Rahman Sagor

22 November 2022	Bashundhara Kings	2–0	Chittagong Abahani	Munshigonj
13:00 BST (UTC+6)	Miguel 75'; Rakib 76'	Report		Stadium: Munshigonj District Stadium; Referee: Md Alamgir Sarker

==== Knockout stages ====
26 November 2021 Quarter-finals	Bashundhara Kings	2–0	Dhaka Mohammedan	Munshigonj
13:00 BST (UTC+6)	Rakib 34'; Robinho 84'	Report		Stadium: Munshigonj District Stadium; Referee: Md Anisur Rahman Sagor

1 December 2022 Semi-finals	Bashundhara Kings	3–1	Bangladesh Police FC	Gopalganj
13:00 BST (UTC+6)	Robino 13' (pen.); Rakib 55'; Dorielton 71'	Report	Edward 90+1'	Stadium: Sheikh Fazlul Haque Mani Stadium; Referee: Md Alamgir Sarker

5 December 2022 Final	Sheikh Russel KC	2–2 (a.e.t.) (1–4 p)	Bashundhara Kings	Comilla
13:00 BST (UTC+6)	Mfon 12', 32' (pen.)	Report	Miguel 1'; Robson 45' (pen.)	Stadium: Comilla District Stadium; Referee: Golam Mourshed Chowdhury Nayan

== Statistics ==
=== Goalscorers ===
Rank	Player	Position	Total	BPL	Independence Cup	Federation Cup
1	(Brazil) Dorielton	FW	33	20	9	4
2	(Brazil) Robinho	FW	18	10	6	2
3	(Brazil) Miguel Figueira	MF	15	10	3	2
4	(Bangladesh) Rakib Hossain	MF	8	4	4	0
5	(Uzbekistan) Asror Gafurov	MF	6	3	0	3
6	(Bangladesh) Yeasin Arafat	MF	2	1	1	0
7	(Bangladesh) Biplu Ahmed	MF	1	0	1	0
7	(Bangladesh) Motin Mia	FW	1	1	0	0
7	(Bangladesh) Sumon Reza	FW	1	0	0	1
7	(Bangladesh) Tariq Kazi	DF	1	0	1	0
7	(Bangladesh) Topu Barman	DF	1	0	0	1
7	(Bangladesh) Masuk Mia Jony	MF	1	0	1	0
7	(Bangladesh) Shekh Morsalin	MF	1	1	0	0
Own goal			2	1	0	1
Total			91	51	26	13

Source: Matches
