= Tariq Kazi =

Bangladeshi football player (born 2000)

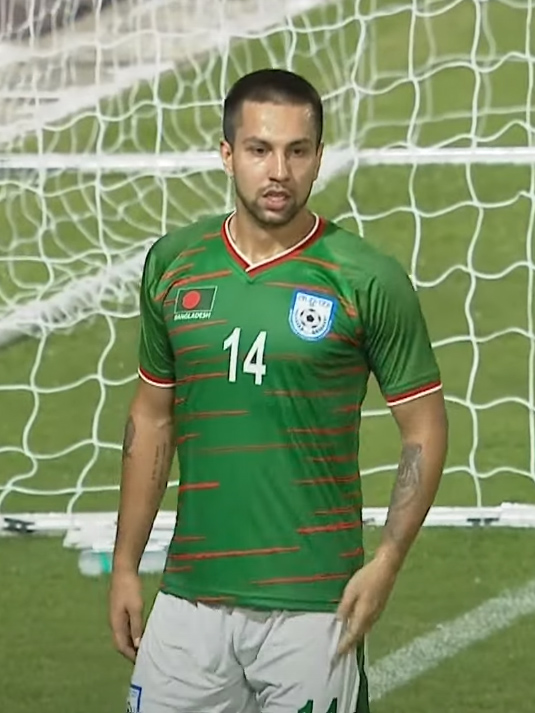
- Tariq with Bangladesh in 2023

Personal information
- Full name: Tariq Raihan Kazi
- Date of birth: 6 October 2000 (age 26)
- Place of birth: Tampere, Finland
- Height: 1.79 m (5 ft 10 1/2 in)
- Positions: Centre back; right-back

Team information
- Current team: Paro
- Number: 40

Youth career
- 2012–2017: Ilves

Senior career*
Years	Team	Apps	(Gls)
2017–2019	Ilves	15	(0)
2018–2019	→ HJS (loan)	8	(0)
2019	→ Ilves II	12	(0)
2020–2025	Bashundhara Kings	61	(0)
2026	Paro	17	(0)

International career^{‡}
2016	Finland U16	1	(0)
2017	Finland U17	3	(0)
2017–2018	Finland U18	4	(0)
2018	Finland U19	1	(0)
2021–	Bangladesh	44	(2)
- * Club domestic league appearances and goals as of October 2026 ‡ National team caps and goals as of 14 November 2026

Tariq Raihan Kazi (Bengali: তারিক রাইহান কাজী; born 6 October 2000) is a professional footballer who plays as a defender. Born in Finland, and a former Finnish youth international, he represents the Bangladesh national team.

Kazi represented Finland at under-17 and under-19 levels internationally, before switching national sides. He is the second non-resident Bangladeshi footballer to represent Bangladesh internationally after Danish-born Jamal Bhuyan.

== Club career ==
=== Ilves ===
Kazi began his career with Ilves, making his Veikkausliiga debut for the club in June 2018 as a substitute in a 3–1 loss to KuPS. On 19 July 2018, Kazi became the first ever Bangladeshi footballer to play in a Europa League match. He came on as a substitute in the 76th minute for Jani Tanska, as Ilves defeated Bulgarian club PFC Slavia Sofia 2–1.

Tariq spent the 2018–19 season on loan at Finnish club HJS Akatemia who played in the Kakkonen, which was the third level in the league system of Finnish football. During the season Tariq managed to make eight appearances for the club.

=== Bashundhara Kings ===
In November 2019, Kazi joined Bangladesh Premier League side Bashundhara Kings on a three-year deal.

On 17 October 2025, Kazi announced that he had terminated his contract with Bashundhara Kings due to outstanding salary payments.

=== Paro ===
In April 2026, Kazi joined Bhutanese champions Paro ahead of the Bhutan Premier League season. He won his first season there with Paro.

== International career ==
Having represented Finland at youth international level, in November 2020, Kazi was called up to the Bangladesh squad for their friendlies against Nepal but had to withdraw from the squad due to injury.

On 3 June 2021, Kazi made his senior international debut for Bangladesh against Afghanistan in the country's 2022 FIFA World Cup qualifier, playing full 90 minutes.

Kazi scored his first international goal on 25 March 2023 against Seychelles in a friendly at the Sylhet District Stadium.

== Personal life ==
Kazi was born to a Finnish mother and a Bangladeshi father in Tampere. Kazi, who has represented Finland in the U17, U18, U19 national team, also has a Bangladeshi passport due to his family roots. His father Sahidul Kazi is a teacher of Tampare University of applied science. Kazi is the grandson of a freedom fighter and school teacher of Naogaon, Abdul Jabber Kazi, who was martyred in the battlefield of 1971 liberation war. He is one of four siblings, with a brother and two sisters.

== Career statistics ==
=== Club ===
As of match played 10 October 2026.

Appearances and goals by club, season and competition
Club	Season	League			National Cup		Continental		Total	
Club	Season	Division	Apps	Goals	Apps	Goals	Apps	Goals	Apps	Goals
Ilves	2017	Veikkausliiga	0	0	0	0	—		0	0
Ilves	2018	Veikkausliiga	12	0	1 (Note: Includes Finnish Cup)	0	1 (Note: Appearance in UEFA Europa League qualifying round)	0	14	0
Ilves	2019	Veikkausliiga	3	0	5	0	—		8	0
Ilves	Total		15	0	6	0	1	0	22	0
HJS (loan)	2018	Kakkonen	8	0	—		—		8	0
Ilves II	2019	Kakkonen	12	0	—		—		12	0
Bashundhara Kings	2019–20	Bangladesh Premier League	2	0	0	0	0	0	2	0
Bashundhara Kings	2020–21	Bangladesh Premier League	16	0	0	0	3 (Note: Appearances in AFC Cup)	0	19	0
Bashundhara Kings	2021–22	Bangladesh Premier League	16	0	0	0	2	0	18	0
Bashundhara Kings	2022–23	Bangladesh Premier League	14	0	3 (Note: Appearance(s) in Bangladesh Federation Cup)	0	0	0	17	0
Bashundhara Kings	2023–24	Bangladesh Premier League	6	0	0	0	6	0	12	0
Bashundhara Kings	2024–25	Bangladesh Premier League	6	0	0	0	1 (Note: Appearance in AFC Challenge League)	0	7	0
Bashundhara Kings	2025–26	Bangladesh Premier League	1	0	0	0	—		1	0
Bashundhara Kings	Total		61	0	3	0	12	0	76	0
Career total			96	0	9	0	13	0	118	0

=== International ===
As of 14 November 2026.

National team	Year	Apps	Goals
Bangladesh	2021	9	0
Bangladesh	2022	4	0
Bangladesh	2023	12	2
Bangladesh	2024	2	0
Bangladesh	2025	8	0
Bangladesh	2026	9	0
Total		44	2

Scores and results list Bangladesh's goal tally first.

List of international goals scored by Tariq Kazi
#	Date	Venue	Opponent	Score	Result	Competition
1.	25 March 2023	Sylhet District Stadium, Sylhet, Bangladesh	Seychelles	1–0	1–0	Friendly
2.	25 June 2023	Sree Kanteerava Stadium, Bangalore, India	Maldives	2–1	3–1	2023 SAFF Championship

== Honours ==
Ilves

- Finnish Cup: 2019

Bashundhara Kings

- Bangladesh Football League: 2021, 2022, 2023–24
- Federation Cup: 2020
- Independence Cup: 2022, 2023; runner-up: 2021

Paro

- Bhutan Premier League: 2026
