= Mahesh Singh Naorem =

Indian footballer

Mahesh Singh
Personal information
- Full name: Mahesh Singh Naorem
- Date of birth: 3 March 1999 (age 27)
- Place of birth: Nambol, Manipur, India
- Height: 1.75 m (5 ft 9 in)
- Position: Winger

Team information
- Current team: East Bengal
- Number: 15

Youth career
- Birchandra Memorial Sporting Club
- 2017–2018: Shillong Lajong

Senior career*
Years	Team	Apps	(Gls)
2018–2020	Shillong Lajong	20	(4)
2020	Kerala Blasters B	3	(1)
2020–2022	Kerala Blasters	0	(0)
2020–2021	→ Sudeva Delhi (loan)	14	(1)
2021–2022	→ East Bengal (loan)	18	(2)
2022–	East Bengal	64	(8)

International career^{‡}
2023–	India	30	(3)
Medal record
Men's football
Representing India
SAFF Championship
Winner	2023 India
CAFA Nations Cup
Third place	2025 Tajikistan–Uzbekistan	Team
- * Club domestic league appearances and goals as of 14:15, 2 March 2025 (UTC) ‡ National team caps and goals as of 22:00, 18 November 2025 (UTC)

Mahesh Singh Naorem (Meitei: Naorem Mahesh Singh, born 3 March 1999) is an Indian professional footballer who plays as a forward for Indian Super League club East Bengal and the India national team.

== Club career ==
=== Early career ===
Born in Manipur, Singh began his career in his home state with Birchandra Memorial Sporting Club. He soon joined the youth side of Shillong Lajong, playing for the club in the Shillong Premier League.

=== Shillong Lajong ===
Prior to the 2018–19 season, Singh was promoted to the first-team. He made his professional debut for Shillong Lajong on 28 October 2018 against Aizawl. He scored a brace, two goals in the 20th and 51st minutes, as Shillong Lajong won 2–1.

=== Kerala Blasters ===
In 2018, it was announced that Naorem had signed for the Indian Super League club Kerala Blasters from Shillong Lajong F.C. Mahesh was part of Reserve squad of the club. Even though he impressed then Blasters assistant coach Ishfaq Ahmed, Mahesh never made an appearance for Kerala Blasters. He was loaned out to different clubs during his stint at Blasters.

==== Sudeva FC (loan) ====
In 2021, Mahesh was loaned to the I league side Sudeva Delhi for a season-long deal for getting enough playing time. He made 14 appearances and scored two goals for the club.

=== East Bengal ===
==== On loan from Kerala ====
Mahesh was loaned to Kolkata based club East Bengal in 2021. He made 18 appearances and scored 2 goals for them in the 2021–22 Indian Super League season.

==== Permanent transfer ====
On 4 August 2022, Kerala Blasters announced the transfer of Mahesh to East Bengal for an undisclosed transfer fee. On 18 November 2022, he scored against Odisha at the Salt Lake Stadium in a 2–4 loss for East Bengal. He bragged man of the match against Jamshedpur on 27 November 2022 after becoming the first Indian player to get three assists in a single Indian Super League game. He scored again on 19 February 2023, against the Shield Champions Mumbai City at the Mumbai Football Arena in a 1–0 win for East Bengal.

In the 2023–24 season, Mahesh became runner-up in the 2023 Durand Cup, and on 23 September 2023, it was announced that Mahesh had signed a three-year extension with East Bengal till 2027. He scored his first goal of the 2023 Indian Super League against Bengaluru on 3 October in a 2–1 defeat away at the Sree Kanteerava Stadium. He scored again on 21 October 2023 against Goa in a 1–2 loss at the Kalinga Stadium. Mahesh won the 2024 Indian Super Cup with East Bengal, having returned from the national team in time for the final of the tournament, and provide an assist for Nandhakumar Sekar as East Bengal won 3–2 against Odisha to end a twelve-year wait for a major domestic trophy for the club. In the 2024–25 season, Mahesh made his one hundredth appearance for East Bengal on 20 April 2025 against Kerala Blasters in the 2025 Indian Super Cup April edition match.

==== Announced as Captain ====
In the 2025–26 season, Naorem Mahesh Singh was announced as the captain for the East Bengal squad.

== International career ==
On 14 March 2023, Singh was named amongst the eleven reserves for Indian senior squad for upcoming Hero Tri-Nation International Football Tournament. Five days later, he was called up to the Indian senior camp for the first time, in place of Sivasakthi Narayanan, who withdrew through an injury. He made his debut against Myanmar on 22 March, replacing Lallianzuala Chhangte after 70 minutes in a 1–0 victory. Mahesh got his second appearance against Kyrgyzstan on 28 March, replacing Brandon Fernandes after 56 minute in a 2–0 victory.

On 24 June 2023, Mahesh got his first goal for the national team against Nepal in a 2–0 victory. On 7 September, he scored his second goal in a 2(4)–2(5) semi-final loss against Iraq at the 2023 King's Cup. On 13 October 2023, Mahesh got his third goal against Malaysia in the 2023 Merdeka Tournament in a 2–4 loss in the semi-final.

== Career statistics ==
=== Club ===
As of 11 April 2026

Club	Season	League			Cup (Note: Includes Super Cup)		Continental		Others		Total	
Club	Season	Division	Apps	Goals	Apps	Goals	Apps	Goals	Apps	Goals	Apps	Goals
Shillong Lajong	2018–19	I-League	20	4	0	0	—		—		20	4
Kerala Blasters B	2020	I-League 2	3	1	0	0	—		—		3	1
Kerala Blasters	2020–21	Indian Super League	0	0	0	0	—		—		0	0
Sudeva Delhi (loan)	2020–21	I-League	14	1	0	0	—		—		14	1
East Bengal (loan)	2021–22	Indian Super League	18	2	0	0	—		—		18	2
East Bengal	2022–23	Indian Super League	19	2	3	3	—		2 (Note: Appearance(s) in Durand Cup.)	0	24	5
East Bengal	2023–24	Indian Super League	21	4	1	0	—		6	1	28	5
East Bengal	2024–25	Indian Super League	20	2	1	0	6 (Note: One appearance in AFC Champions League Two and Five appearances in AFC Challenge League.)	0	3	0	30	2
East Bengal	2025–26	Indian Super League	4	0	5	1	—		6 (Note: Five appearances in the Durand Cup; One appearance in the IFA Shield.)	1	15	2
East Bengal	Total		64	8	10	4	6	0	17	2	97	14
Career total			119	16	10	4	6	0	17	2	152	22

=== International ===
As of 18 November 2025

National team	Year	Apps	Goals
India	2023	15	3
India	2024	6	0
India	2025	9	0
Total		30	3

==== International goals ====
India score listed first, score column indicates score after each Singh's goal.

List of international goals scored by Naorem Mahesh Singh
No.	Date	Venue	Cap	Opponent	Score	Result	Competition	Ref.
1	24 June 2023	Sree Kanteerava Stadium, Bengaluru, India	8	Nepal	2–0	2–0	2023 SAFF Championship	
2	7 September 2023	700th Anniversary Stadium, Chiang Mai, Thailand	12	Iraq	1–0	2–2 (4–5)	2023 King's Cup	
3	13 October 2023	Bukit Jalil National Stadium, Kuala Lumpur, Malaysia	14	Malaysia	1–1	2–4	2023 Merdeka Tournament	

== Honours ==
India

- Tri-Nation Friendly Series: 2023
- Intercontinental Cup: 2023
- SAFF Championship: 2023

Kerala Blasters B

- Kerala Premier League: 2019–20

East Bengal

- Super Cup: 2024
- Durand Cup runner-up: 2023
- IFA Shield runner-up: 2025
- Indian Super League: 2025–26

Individual

- Indian Super League Emerging Player of the Month: November 2022
