= Jay Gupta =

Indian footballer (born 2001)

Personal information
- Date of birth: 27 September 2001 (age 25)
- Place of birth: Pune, India
- Height: 1.85 m (6 ft 1 in)
- Positions: Left-back; centre-back

Team information
- Current team: East Bengal
- Number: 27

Youth career
- 2017–2019: Pune City
- 2019–2020: GDS Cascais

Senior career*
Years	Team	Apps	(Gls)
2021–2023	Estoril	34	(3)
2023	Ebre Escola Esportiva	4	(0)
2023–2025	Goa	42	(2)
2025–	East Bengal	10	(0)

International career^{‡}
2024–	India	5	(0)
- * Club domestic league appearances and goals as of 16:30, 6 April 2025 (UTC) ‡ National team caps and goals as of 22:00, 3 October 2026 (UTC)

Jay Gupta (born 27 September 2001) is an Indian professional footballer who plays as a defender for Indian Super League club East Bengal and the India national team.

He spent most of his career abroad, predominantly in Portugal and Spain, between 2019 and 2023.

== Club career ==
=== Earlier career ===
Gupta went to Portugal in 2019, after training with former Indian Super League outfit Pune City for two seasons. He became part of youth system of Lisbon-based club GDS Cascais, appearing with their U19 team in 2019–20 AF Lisboa Jun. A 1ª Divisão. Gupta began his senior club career with AF Lisboa 2ª Divisão side G.D. Estoril B in 2021. His first goal came on 26 September 2020, against Atlético Malveira, in their 4–1 defeat in quarter-final of 2020–21 AF Lisboa Taça. He then featured in trials of Odisha in the mid-season, impressed coach Josep Gombau, but the deal fall through due to technical reasons. After spending two seasons at G.D. Estoril Praia B, Gupta went on to sign with Spanish Tercera Federación club Ebre Escola Esportiva in 2023 and appeared in Segona Catalana matches.

=== FC Goa ===
On 7 August 2023, it was officially announced that Indian Super League club FC Goa roped him in as their new addition to the defence. He earned caps for Manolo Márquez managed Goa in 2023 Durand Cup, in which they reached semi-finals, until going down to Mohun Bagan. He made his competitive league debut on 2 October against newly promoted side Punjab, in their 1–0 victory.

On 7 October, he scored first goal for the club with a curler right at the death in the campaign against Odisha, in their 3–2 win at home. Ahead of the international break in November, he was awarded the ISL Emerging Player of the Month award for October, with one goal and one assist in the five matches he played, and a crucial role in Goa's unbeaten run. On 9 February 2024, he scored his second league goal against Odisha in an 1–1 tie in Bhubaneswar.

=== East Bengal ===
On 15 July 2025, Gupta moved to East Bengal for a transfer fee of ₹1.5 crore, plus ₹10 lakh in appearance-based bonuses. This made it the highest fee FC Goa had ever received for an Indian player, surpassing the club's previous record set by Aibanbha Dohling in 2023.

== International career ==
On 7 March 2024, Gupta was called up to the national squad of India as one of the 35 probables by head coach Igor Štimac, for the two matches against Afghanistan in round 2 of the 2026 FIFA World Cup qualifiers.

Gupta made his debut on 6 June 2024 in a World Cup qualifier against Kuwait at the Salt Lake Stadium. He started the game and played 83 minutes as the game ended 0–0, in which team captain Sunil Chhetri bid adieu his long international career. On 11 June, he appeared in their last game of the qualification stage against Qatar at the Jassim Bin Hamad Stadium as starter until being substituted due to an injury, in which India lost 1–2 and failed to move to the third round.

== Personal life ==
Gupta was born in Pune, Maharashtra.

== Style of play ==
Playing primarily as a left-back, Gupta is also capable of playing any role in the defensive area. He can play the role of a venture forward, contributing in attack, in addition into defensive duties.

== Career statistics ==
=== Club ===
As of 3 May 2025

Club	Season	League			National Cup		League Cup		AFC		Total	
Club	Season	Division	Apps	Goals	Apps	Goals	Apps	Goals	Apps	Goals	Apps	Goals
Goa	2023–24	Indian Super League	25	2	3 (Note: Appearance(s) in Super Cup)	0	3 (Note: Appearance(s) in Durand Cup)	0	–		31	2
Goa	2024–25	Indian Super League	17	0	4	0	–		–		21	0
Goa	Career total		42	2	7	0	3	0	0	0	52	2
East Bengal	2025–26	Indian Super League	0	0	0	0	0	0	–		0	0
Career total			42	2	7	0	3	0	0	0	52	2

=== International ===
As of 3 October 2026

National team	Year	Apps	Goals
India	2024	3	0
India	2025	0	0
India	2026	2	0
Total		5	0

== Honours ==
FC Goa

- Super Cup: 2025

East Bengal FC

- Indian Super League: 2025–26

Individual

- Indian Super League Emerging Player of the Month: October 2023

== See also ==
- List of Indian expatriate footballers
