= Miguel Figueira =

Brazilian footballer

Personal information
- Full name: Miguel Figueira Damasceno
- Date of birth: 22 April 2000 (age 26)
- Place of birth: Santana, Amapá, Brazil
- Height: 1.88 m (6 ft 2 in)
- Position: Attacking midfielder

Team information
- Current team: Mohun Bagan
- Number: 10

Senior career*
Years	Team	Apps	(Gls)
2019–2022	Goiás Esporte Clube	35	(5)
2022–2025	Bashundhara Kings	48	(31)
2025–2026	East Bengal	26	(3)
2026–	Mohun Bagan	2	(1)
- * Club domestic league appearances and goals as of 16 October 2026

Miguel Figueira Damasceno (born 22 April 2000) is a Brazilian professional footballer who plays as a midfielder for Indian Super League club Mohun Bagan.

== Career ==
=== Goias ===
Figueira made his professional debut with Goiás in a 3–0 Campeonato Brasileiro Série A win over Fluminense on 22 September 2019.

=== Bashundhara Kings ===
On 14 April 2022, Figueira joined defending Bangladesh Premier League champions Bashundhara Kings on a five month deal. He won the league in his first season with the club.

In the following year's 2022 AFC Cup, his club won a maiden victory over Mohun Bagan. In the next match, his goal helped the club to win a match over Maziya.

Miguel's goal helped the club win the 2024–25 Federation Cup.

=== East Bengal ===
On 18 July 2025, Indian Super League club East Bengal announced the signing of Figueira on a season-long contract. In his debut season, he won the Indian Super League Golden Ball as East Bengal secured their first ISL title.

== Career statistics ==
As of match played 21 May 2026

Appearances and goals by club, season and competition
Club	Season	League			State league (Note: Includes Campeonato Goiano)		National cup (Note: Includes Copa do Brasil, Federation Cup (Bangladesh), AIFF Super Cup)		Continental		Other		Total	
Club	Season	Division	Apps	Goals	Apps	Goals	Apps	Goals	Apps	Goals	Apps	Goals	Apps	Goals
Goiás Esporte Clube	2019	Série A	1	0	1	0	—		—		2 (Note: Appearance(s) in Copa Verde)	0	4	0
Goiás Esporte Clube	2020	Série A	23	1	9	2	—		1 (Note: Appearance(s) in Copa Sudamericana)	0	—		33	3
Goiás Esporte Clube	2021	Série B	7	0	9	1	1	0	—		—		17	1
Goiás Esporte Clube	2022	Série A	0	0	2	0	0	0	—		—		2	0
Goiás Esporte Clube	Total		31	1	21	3	1	0	1	0	2	0	56	4
Bashundhara Kings	2021–22	Bangladesh Premier League	10	8	—		0	0	3 (Note: Appearance(s) in AFC Cup)	0	—		13	8
Bashundhara Kings	2022–23	Bangladesh Premier League	15	10	—		2	2	—		6 (Note: Appearance (s) in Independence Cup)	3	23	15
Bashundhara Kings	2023–24	Bangladesh Premier League	14	8	—		2	1	6 (Note: One appearance in AFC Champions League, five appearances and three goals in AFC Cup)	3	4	2	26	14
Bashundhara Kings	2024–25	Bangladesh Premier League	9	5	—		2	2	3 (Note: Appearances in AFC Challenge League)	0	—		14	7
Bashundhara Kings	Total		48	31	—		6	5	12	3	10	5	76	44
East Bengal	2025–26	Indian Super League	12	2	—		5	1	—		4 (Note: Appearance(s) in Durand Cup)	0	21	3
Career total			91	34	21	3	12	6	13	3	16	5	153	51

== Honours ==
Mohun Bagan SG

• IFA Shield: 2026

Bashundhara Kings

- Bangladesh Premier League: 2021–22, 2022–23, 2023–24
- Independence Cup: 2022–23, 2023–24
- Bangladesh Federation Cup: 2024–25; third place: 2022–23
- Bsngladesh Challenge Cup: 2024

East Bengal

- ISL Cup: 2025–26

Individual

- Indian Super League Golden Ball: 2025–26
