= Edmund Lalrindika =

Indian footballer (born 1999)

Personal information
- Date of birth: 24 April 1999 (age 27)
- Place of birth: Lunglei, Mizoram, India
- Height: 1.76 m (5 ft 9 in)
- Position: Winger

Team information
- Current team: East Bengal
- Number: 10

Youth career
- –2017: AIFF Elite Academy
- 2017: Bengaluru

Senior career*
Years	Team	Apps	(Gls)
2017–2019	Bengaluru B	4	(2)
2017–2018	→ Indian Arrows (loan)	13	(1)
2019–2024	Bengaluru	13	(0)
2020	→ East Bengal (loan)	2	(0)
2023–2024	→ Inter Kashi (loan)	22	(4)
2024–2025	Inter Kashi	21	(5)
2025–	East Bengal	10	(4)

International career^{‡}
2017	India U20	6	(2)
2024–	India	13	(0)
- * Club domestic league appearances and goals as of 17:30, 6 April 2025 (UTC) ‡ National team caps and goals as of 22:00, 6 October 2026 (UTC)

Edmund Lalrindika (born 24 April 1999) is an Indian professional footballer who plays as a forward for Indian Super League club East Bengal and the Indian national football team.

== Club career ==
Born in Lunglei, Mizoram, Lalrindika was announced as part of the Bengaluru reserve side for the 2017–18 season. A month later, Lalrindika was selected to play for the Indian Arrows, an All India Football Federation-owned team that would consist of India under-20 players to give them playing time. He made his professional debut for the side in the Arrow's first match of the season against Chennai City. He started and played 90 minutes as Indian Arrows won 3–0.

=== Inter Kashi ===
On 2 September 2023, Bengaluru confirmed that Lalrindika would join newly formed club Inter Kashi on a 12-month loan until the end of the 2023–24 season. On 28 October 2023, Inter Kashi played their first ever official match against Gokulam Kerala in the I-League. Lalrindika scored the club's first goal, in a 2–2 draw.

On 26 March 2024, Lalrindika terminated his contract with Bengaluru and signed permanently with Inter Kashi, on a two-year deal. He made 22 league appearances for the club on loan, scoring 4 goals and delivered 8 assists.

=== East Bengal ===
On 14 May 2025, Indian Super League outfit East Bengal roped in Lalrindika for an undisclosed transfer fee from Inter Kashi.

On 17 May 2026, Lalrindika scored in the 85th minute of the title-deciding Kolkata Derby in Indian Super League thereby taking off his shirt with the match resulting in 1-1. He eventually got sent off after a second yellow card in the 90+8th minute.

== International career ==
Lalrindika represented the India under-20 side. He made his first debut for the senior national team also on 6 June 2024 in a match against Kuwait, where his aggressive approach game caught attention by many viewers.

== Career statistics ==
=== Club ===
As of 8 October 2025

Club	Season	League			National Cup		League Cup		Others		AFC		Total	
Club	Season	Division	Apps	Goals	Apps	Goals	Apps	Goals	Apps	Goals	Apps	Goals	Apps	Goals
Bengaluru	2017–18	Indian Super League	0	0	—		—		—		—		0	0
Bengaluru	2018–19	Indian Super League	5	0	—		—		—		—		5	0
Bengaluru	2019–20	Indian Super League	2	0	—		3 (Note: Appearance(s) in Durand Cup)	0	—		—		5	0
Bengaluru	2020–21	Indian Super League	3	0	—		—		—		1 (Note: Appearance(s) in AFC Cup)	0	4	0
Bengaluru	2021–22	Indian Super League	3	0	—		—		—		—		3	0
Bengaluru	2023–24	Indian Super League	0	0	—		3	0	—		—		3	0
Bengaluru	Total		13	0	0	0	6	0	0	0	1	0	20	0
Indian Arrows (loan)	2017–18	I-League	13	1	1 (Note: Appearance(s) in Super Cup)	0	—		—		—		14	1
Bengaluru B	2018–19	I-League 2nd Division	4	2	—		—		—		—		4	2
East Bengal (loan)	2019–20	I-League	2	0	—		—		—		—		2	0
Inter Kashi (loan)	2023–24	I-League	22	4	4	2	—		—		—		26	6
Inter Kashi	2023–24	I-League	2	0	—		—		—		—		2	0
Inter Kashi	2024–25	I-League	19	4	2	0	3	0	—		—		24	4
Inter Kashi	Total		21	4	2	0	3	0	0	0	0	0	26	4
East Bengal	2025–26	Indian Super League	1	0	0	0	6 (Note: Five appearances in the Durand Cup and one appearance in the IFA Shield)	0	6 (Note: Appearance(s) in the Calcutta Football League.)	0	—		13	0
Career total			76	11	7	2	15	0	6	0	1	0	105	13

=== International ===
As of 6 October 2026

National team	Year	Apps	Goals
India	2024	5	0
India	2025	1	0
India	2026	7	0
Total		13	0

== Honours ==
Bengaluru

- Indian Super League: 2018–19

East Bengal FC

- Indian Super League: 2025–26
