= Anton Søjberg =

Danish footballer (born 2000)

Personal information
- Full name: Anton Søjberg Horup
- Date of birth: 21 December 2000 (age 25)
- Place of birth: Aarhus, Denmark
- Height: 1.86 m (6 ft 1 in)
- Position: Centre-forward

Team information
- Current team: Bhayangkara Presisi
- Number: 9

Youth career
- –2016: VSK Aarhus
- 2017: AGF Aarhus
- 2017: Brabrand IF

Senior career*
Years	Team	Apps	(Gls)
2018–2021	Brabrand IF	38	(12)
2021	Skive IK	3	(1)
2021–2023	Vendsyssel FF	32	(7)
2023	HK Kópavogur	9	(4)
2024	B36 Tórshavn	26	(9)
2025	Monterey Bay	26	(8)
2026	East Bengal	10	(1)
2026–	Bhayangkara Presisi	6	(0)
- * Club domestic league appearances and goals as of 22:30, 11 September 2026 (UTC)

Anton Søjberg (born 21 December 2000) is a Danish professional footballer who plays as a forward for Super League club Bhayangkara Presisi. He has previously played for HK Kópavogur in Úrvalsdeildin, the Icelandic top division, Vendsyssel FF in the Danish first division

== Career ==
Søjberg spent his youth career in VSK Aarhus. As a 16-year-old he moved to the top-tier club AGF Aarhus, but was not able to gain a professional contract. He then decided to move to the suburban club Brabrand IF in Aarhus, where his father was coach. Anton Søjberg soon managed to establish himself as a senior player in Brabrand IF. He enjoyed great success, and soon attracted interest from bigger clubs in the area.

In 2021 he left Brabrand IF for professional football. After a short intermezzo as parttimer in Skive IK he gained a full time contract in Vendsyssel FF. Anton Søjberg played in Vendsyssel FF for two years, and was then offered a new contract. He turned the offer down, and moved to Iceland to play for HK Kópavogur. After a few months in Iceland it became clear to him, that the club could not match his ambitions, and he decided to use a clause in his contract to have it terminated.

A short time before the transfer deadline Anton Søjberg moved to B36 Tórshavn, who is a regular participant in European club competitions. He had a convincing debut by scoring both goals in the match against KÍ Klaksvik, who have been champions for the last two seasons, and also participated in the 2023 group stage in UEFA Europa Conference League.

On 30 December 2024, Monterey Bay FC in the American USL Championship announced they had signed Søjberg to a one-year contract. Søjberg departed the club following the 2025 season after his contract option was not activated.

On 17 February 2026, East Bengal FC of the Indian Super League announced the signing of Søjberg.

On 27 August 2026, Søjberg completed a transfer to Southeast Asia, officially signing with Indonesian top-flight side Bhayangkara Presisi ahead of the 2026–27 Super League campaign.

== Honours ==
East Bengal FC

- ISL Cup: 2025–26
