= Mohammed Rashid =

Palestinian footballer

Personal information
- Full name: Mohammed Bassim Ahmed Rashid
- Date of birth: 3 July 1995 (age 31)
- Place of birth: Ramallah, Palestine
- Height: 1.82 m (6 ft 0 in)
- Position: Defensive midfielder

Team information
- Current team: East Bengal
- Number: 74

College career
Years	Team	Apps	(Gls)
2013–2017	Saint Francis Fighting Saints	64	(18)

Senior career*
Years	Team	Apps	(Gls)
2017–2018	Hilal Al-Quds	15	(3)
2018–2020	Shabab Al-Bireh	29	(4)
2020–2021	Al-Jeel	26	(7)
2021–2022	Persib Bandung	27	(6)
2022	Smouha	1	(0)
2023	Jabal Al-Mukaber	18	(0)
2023–2024	Bali United	32	(2)
2024–2025	Persebaya Surabaya	33	(6)
2025–	East Bengal	12	(1)

International career^{‡}
2018	Palestine U23	4	(0)
2018–2024	Palestine	53	(2)
- * Club domestic league appearances and goals as of 21 May 2026 ‡ National team caps and goals as of 19 November 2024

Mohammed Bassim Ahmed Rashid (Arabic: مُحَمَّد بَاسِم أَحْمَد رَاشِد; born 3 July 1995) is a Palestinian professional footballer who plays as a defensive midfielder for Indian Super League club East Bengal and the Palestine national team.

== Club career ==
=== Persib Bandung ===
On 17 June 2021, he signed a one-year contract with Indonesian Liga 1 club Persib Bandung. He made his professional debut for the club, in a 1–0 win against Barito Putera on 4 September 2021.

On 11 September 2021, Rashid made his first goals for the club when he scored a brace in 2021–22 Liga 1, earning them a 2–1 win over Persita Tangerang.

== International career ==
Rashid played at the 2019 AFC Asian Cup in the United Arab Emirates and the 2023 AFC Asian Cup in Qatar.

== Career statistics ==
=== International ===
As of 19 November 2024

Palestine
Year	Apps	Goals
2018	11	0
2019	11	0
2021	6	1
2022	3	1
2023	6	0
2024	16	0
Total	53	2

=== International goals ===
Goal	Date	Venue	Opponent	Score	Result	Competition
1.	4 December 2021	Education City Stadium, Al Rayyan, Qatar	Saudi Arabia	1–0	1–1	2021 FIFA Arab Cup
2.	11 June 2022	MFF Football Centre, Ulaanbaatar, Mongolia	Yemen	2–0	5–0	2023 AFC Asian Cup qualification

== Honours ==
East Bengal FC

- Indian Super League: 2025–26

Jabal Al-Mukaber

- West Bank Premier League: 2023

Individual

- APPI Indonesian Football Award Fans Favourite Footballer: 2021–22
- Persib Bandung Celebration of the Year 2021–22
- Liga 1 Goal of the Month: March 2024
