= Debjit Majumder =

Indian footballer (born 1988)

Personal information
- Full name: Debjit Majumder
- Date of birth: 6 March 1988 (age 38)
- Place of birth: Hindmotor, West Bengal, India
- Height: 1.75 m (5 ft 9 in)
- Position: Goalkeeper

Team information
- Current team: East Bengal
- Number: 24

Youth career
- Uttarpara Netaji Brigade
- Food Corporation of India FC

Senior career*
Years	Team	Apps	(Gls)
2008–2010	FCI FC		
2010–2011	Kalighat MS		
2011	→ United Sikkim (loan)		
2011–2012	East Bengal	0	(0)
2012–2014	Bhawanipore		
2014–2017	Mohun Bagan	45	(0)
2015	→ Mumbai City (loan)	2	(0)
2016	→ ATK (loan)	15	(0)
2017–2020	ATK	12	(0)
2019–2020	→ Mohun Bagan (loan)	2	(0)
2020–2021	East Bengal	15	(0)
2021–2024	Chennaiyin	38	(0)
2024–	East Bengal	26	(0)
- * Club domestic league appearances and goals as of 19:29, 20 April 2024 (UTC)

Debjit Majumder (Bengali: দেবজিৎ মজুমদার; born 6 March 1988) is an Indian professional footballer who plays as a goalkeeper for Indian Super League club East Bengal.

== Early life and career ==
Majumder hails from Hindmotor, known for Hindustan Motors factory(now closed), in Hooghly district. Majumder spent early years at Uttarpara Netaji Brigade team under coach Anup Nag. He started his career at Calcutta Football League (CFL) with the Food Corporation of India FC (FCI) football team. He went on to play for teams like United Sikkim and Kalighat MS.

== Career ==
=== East Bengal ===
Majumder joined East Bengal for the 2011–12 season and made 4 appearances.

=== Bhawanipore ===
Majumder played for I-League 2nd Division team, Bhawanipore F.C. for two seasons and the team came close to promotion during 2014 season.

=== Mohun Bagan ===
Majumder was signed as replacement keeper by Mohun Bagan in 2014, as Shilton Paul was loaned to Chennaiyin FC. Majumder was awarded man of the match for his performance against East Bengal on 28 March 2015 in Kolkata derby. As a result of his stellar performances during the current season, he was selected the Best Goalkeeper of I-League 2015. In 2015-16 I-League season, Majumder used as the number 1 goalkeeper and also played AFC Champions League Qualifier game against Tampines Rovers FC & Shandong Luneng Taishan. He was also awarded the FPAI Fans Player of the Year award in the 2015–16 season.

==== Mumbai City (loan) ====
In July 2015 Majumder was drafted to play for Mumbai City FC in the 2015 Indian Super League.

==== Atlético de Kolkata (loan) ====
On 4 July 2016, Atlético de Kolkata confirmed that Debjit has signed on the dotted lines on loan from Mohun Bagan for third season of Hero ISL.

=== ATK ===
In July 2017, ATK has retained AIFF Goalkeeper of the year Debjit Majumder for 3 years.

=== East Bengal ===
In 2020, Debjit Majumder has signed for his former club East Bengal and will play in the 2020–21 Indian Super League.

=== Chennaiyin ===
He was signed by Chennaiyin in 2021–22 ISL.

== Career statistics ==
=== Club ===
As of 20 April 2024

Club	Season	League			Cup		AFC		Total	
Club	Season	Division	Apps	Goals	Apps	Goals	Apps	Goals	Apps	Goals
Mohun Bagan	2014–15	I-League	14	0	0	0	—		14	0
Mohun Bagan	2015–16	I-League	14	0	1 (Note: Appearance(s) in Federation Cup)	0	4 (Note: Appearance(s) in AFC Champions League) (Note: Appearance(s) in AFC Cup)	0	19	0
Mohun Bagan	2016–17	I-League	17	0	4	0	2	0	23	0
Mumbai City (loan)	2015	Indian Super League	2	0	0	0	—		2	0
ATK (loan)	2016	Indian Super League	15	0	0	0	—		15	0
ATK	2017–18	Indian Super League	12	0	0	0	—		12	0
ATK	2018–19	Indian Super League	0	0	3 (Note: Appearance(s) in Super Cup)	0	—		3	0
Mohun Bagan (loan)	2019–20	I-League	2	0	2 (Note: Appearance(s) in Durand Cup)	0	—		4	0
East Bengal	2020–21	Indian Super League	15	0	0	0	—		15	0
Chennaiyin	2021–22	Indian Super League	10	0	0	0	—		10	0
Chennaiyin	2022–23	Indian Super League	9	0	4	0	—		13	0
Chennaiyin	2023–24	Indian Super League	19	0	3	0	—		22	0
Chennaiyin	Total		38	0	7	0	0	0	45	0
East Bengal	2024–25	Indian Super League	0	0	0	0	—		0	0
Career total			129	0	17	0	6	0	152	0

== Honours ==
Bhawanipore

- Bordoloi Trophy: 2013

Mohun Bagan

- I-League: 2014–15, 2019–20
- Federation Cup: 2015–16

Atletico de Kolkata

- Indian Super League: 2016

East Bengal FC

- Indian Super League: 2025-26

Individual

- Bordoloi Trophy player of the tournament: 2013
- Best goalkeeper of I-League: 2014–15
- Best goalkeeper of I-League: 2016–17
