= Sayan Banerjee =

Indian footballer (born 2003)

Personal information
- Date of birth: 14 January 2003 (age 23)
- Place of birth: Asansol, West Bengal, India
- Height: 1.70 m (5 ft 7 in)
- Position: Winger

Team information
- Current team: Mohun Bagan Super Giant
- Number: 84

Youth career
- 2023: Kalighat MS

Senior career*
| Years | Team | Apps | (Gls) |
| 2022 | Goalorious Mother SC | 20 | (4) |
| 2022–2023 | City FC | 9 | (4) |
| 2023 | Kalighat Milan Sangha | 11 | (3) |
| 2023–2026 | East Bengal | 38 | (10) |
| 2026– | Mohun Bagan | 0 | (0) |
- * Club domestic league appearances and goals as of 19:55, 16 May 2024 (UTC)

Sayan Banerjee (born 14 January 2003), is an Indian professional footballer who plays as a winger for Indian Super League club Mohun Bagan.

== Club career ==
=== GMSC ===
Sayan scored four goals and made three assists for Goalorious Mother SC playing in the 2021–22 MFA Elite Division.

=== City FC ===
The following season, Sayan signed for City FC, a club of Senior Division League, second tier of Delhi Football League. He scored four goals in nine games.

=== Kalighat MS ===
Sayan joined Kalighat Milan Sangha FC for 2023 CFL Premier Division. He had a brilliant season and scored three goals in eleven games. He scored a brace against Dalhousie AC where he also scored the fastest goal of the season in 53 seconds.

=== East Bengal ===
Sayan signed for East Bengal in 2023 on a three-year contract after impressing in the 2023 CFL Premier Division for Kalighat Milan Sangha. Sayan was registered into the East Bengal squad for the 2024 Indian Super Cup and made his debut for the club on 19 January 2024 in the Kolkata Derby against Mohun Bagan SG in a 3–1 victory when he came in as a substitute for Nandhakumar Sekar in the 97th minute of the match. Sayan also made an appearance in the final as East Bengal became champions of the 2024 Indian Super Cup defeating Odisha 3–2. Sayan made his Indian Super League debut on 3 February 2024 in the Kolkata Derby once again against Mohun Bagan SG, when he came in as a substitute for P. V. Vishnu in the 63rd minute of the match. Sayan made his first start on 10 February 2024 against NorthEast United.

== Career statistics ==
=== Club ===
As of 5 November 2026

| Club | Season | League | | | Super Cup | | Durand Cup | | AFC | | Other | | Total | |
| Club | Season | Division | Apps | Goals | Apps | Goals | Apps | Goals | Apps | Goals | Apps | Goals | Apps | Goals |
|---|---|---|---|---|---|---|---|---|---|---|---|---|---|---|
| GMSC | 2021–22 | MFA Elite Division | ? | 4 | – | | | | | | | | ? | 4 |
| City FC | 2022–23 | Senior Division League | 9 | 4 | – | | | | | | | | 9 | 4 |
| Kalighat MS | 2023–24 | Calcutta Premier Division | 11 | 3 | – | | | | | | | | 11 | 3 |
| East Bengal | 2023–24 | Indian Super League | 7 | 1 | 3 (Note: Appearances in the Super Cup.) | 0 | – | | | | | | 10 | 1 |
| East Bengal | 2024–25 | Indian Super League | 8 | 0 | 0 | 0 | – | | | | 12 (Note: Appearances in the Calcutta Football League) | 5 | 20 | 5 |
| East Bengal | 2025–26 | Indian Super League | 0 | 0 | 0 | 0 | – | | | | 15 (Note: 12 Appearances and 5 Goals in 2025 Calcutta League, 1 Appearance each in 2025 IFA Shield, 2025 Oil India Gold Cup, 2025 Sikkim Gold Cup) | 5 | 15 | 5 |
| East Bengal | East Bengal total | | 15 | 1 | 3 | 0 | 0 | 0 | 0 | 0 | 27 | 10 | 45 | 11 |
| Mohun Bagan | 2026–27 | Indian Super League | 0 | 0 | – | | 3 | 0 | – | | 14 (Note: 13 Appearance(s) and 2 Goals in 2026 Calcutta League and 1 Appearance in 2026 IFA Shield) | 2 | 17 | 2 |
| Career total | | | 35 | 12 | 3 | 0 | 3 | 0 | 0 | 0 | 41 | 12 | 82 | 24 |

== Honours ==
Mohun Bagan

- IFA Shield: 2026
- Calcutta Football League: 2026

East Bengal

• Calcutta Football League: 2024, 2025

- Indian Super League: 2025-26
- Super Cup: 2024
