= 2024–25 East Bengal FC season =

Indian football club season

East Bengal
2024–25 season
- Owner: Emami East Bengal FC Pvt. Ltd.
- Head coach: Carles Cuadrat (until 30 September 2024); Bino George (interim) (30 September 2024 to 8 October 2024); Óscar Bruzón (from 8 October 2024)
- Stadium: Salt Lake Stadium; East Bengal Ground
- Indian Super League: 9th
- Calcutta Football League: Champions
- Durand Cup: Quarter-Final
- Super Cup: Round of 16
- AFC CL2: Preliminary Round
- AFC CGL: Quarter-Final
- Top goalscorer: League: P. V. Vishnu (4 goals); All: Jesin TK (14 goals)
- Highest home attendance: 59,782 vs Mohun Bagan SG (19 October 2024, ISL)
- Lowest home attendance: 9,987 vs Hyderabad (26 February 2025, ISL)
- Average home league attendance: 18,431
- Biggest win: 7–1 Tollygunge Agragami (30 June 2024, CFL)
- Biggest defeat: 0–4 NorthEast United (8 March 2025, ISL)
Home colours	Away colours	Third colours

The 2024–25 season is the 105th season of East Bengal Football Club and their fifth season in the Indian Super League, and the twenty-ninth consecutive season in the top flight of Indian football.

== Background ==
East Bengal was active at the end of the previous season, roping in French attacking midfielder Madih Talal from Punjab. The club also roped in four Indian players – David Lalhlansanga, Provat Lakra, Debjit Majumder, and Mark Zothanpuia to bolster the ranks. The club also got Premier 1 club licensing for the 2024–25 season, announced by the AIFF. The club also extended the contract of Mohammad Rakip and signed Nishu Kumar on a permanent basis. The club also roped in the Golden Boot winner of the 2023–24 Indian Super League – Dimitrios Diamantakos on a two-year contract from Kerala Blasters. The club also announced that Cleiton Silva would continue as the captain of the side and Naorem Mahesh Singh would be the vice captain for the team. East Bengal also roped in the Indian national team midfielder Jeakson Singh on a record breaking transfer amount from Kerala Blasters on a four-year deal. On 12 August 2024, after a long saga, East Bengal signed Indian national team defender Anwar Ali from Delhi FC on a 5-year permanent deal, making him one of the highest paid Indian footballers.

=== Anwar Ali Controversy ===
The controversial transfer of Anwar Ali from Mohun Bagan Super Giant to Delhi FC and thereafter to East Bengal was appealed and heard by the AIFF Players Status Committee (PSC) on 3 August 2024 and stated that the termination of contract by Anwar Ali with Mohun Bagan Super Giant was 'unjust'. On 10 August, all three parties were again summoned and heard by the PSC and AIFF PSC provided the No Objection Certificate (NOC), at his own risk, for purposes of player registration and registration on the AIFF CRS (Central Registration System). On 12 August, Anwar officially completed his transfer from Delhi to East Bengal. On 10 September, the AIFF PSC announced their verdict on the case where Anwar Ali was handed a suspension of four months, with Mohun Bagan Super Giant to receive a compensation of ₹12.9 crore (US$1.4 million) from Anwar Ali, East Bengal and Delhi and both East Bengal and Delhi have been handed a two-window transfer ban. On 12 September, East Bengal filed a writ petition in Delhi High Court asking for a stay order on the decision of the AIFF PSC. On 13 September, Justice Sanjeev Narula directed AIFF PSC to withdraw its order of September 10 and asked for a fresh hearing of the case on 14 September. After hearing the matter, the committee would pass a detailed order. On 19 September, the AIFF PSC officially handed Anwar Ali the NOC allowing him to play for East Bengal in the Indian Super League until the next meeting on the issue.

== Transfers ==
=== Incoming ===
Date	No.	Pos.	Name	Signed from	Fee	Ref
14 June 2024	9	FW	(Greece) Dimitrios Diamantakos	(India) Kerala Blasters	Free Transfer	
18 June 2024	14	FW	(India) David Lalhlansanga	(India) Mohammedan Sporting	Free Transfer	
22 June 2024	88	MF	(India) Mark Zothanpuia	(India) Hyderabad	Free Transfer	
27 June 2024	8	MF	(France) Madih Talal	(India) Punjab	Free Transfer	
28 June 2024	22	DF	(India) Nishu Kumar	(India) Kerala Blasters	Free Transfer	
2 July 2024	3	DF	(India) Provat Lakra	(India) Jamshedpur	Free Transfer	
3 July 2024	24	GK	(India) Debjit Majumder	(India) Chennaiyin	Free Transfer	
19 July 2024	6	MF	(India) Jeakson Singh	(India) Kerala Blasters	Undisclosed (Note: Reported as ₹3.2 crore (US$340,000), a record breaking transfer amount in Indian football.)	
1 August 2024	44	DF	(Spain) Héctor Yuste	(India) Mohun Bagan SG	Free Transfer	
13 August 2024	4	CB	(India) Anwar Ali	(India) Delhi FC	Undisclosed (Note: Reported as ₹2.5 crore (US$270,000))	
7 January 2025	7	LW	(Venezuela) Richard Celis	(Venezuela) Academia Puerto Cabello	Free Transfer	
5 February 2025	28	FW	(Cameroon) Messi Bouli	(China) Shijiazhuang Gongfu	Free Transfer	

=== Outgoing ===
Exit Date	No.	Pos.	Name	Signed to	Fee	Ref
1 June 2024	6	MF	(India) Ajay Chhetri	(India) Bengaluru	End of Loan	
1 June 2024	7	DF	(India) Harmanjot Singh Khabra	—	Released	
1 June 2024	9	MF	(Spain) Víctor Vázquez	—	Released	
1 June 2024	17	DF	(India) Mandar Rao Dessai	(India) Chennaiyin	Free Transfer	
1 June 2024	28	DF	(Serbia) Aleksandar Pantić	—	Released	
1 June 2024	40	DF	(India) Tingku Kangujam	—	Released	
1 June 2024	91	FW	(Germany) Felicio Brown Forbes	(Thailand) Muangthong United	Free Transfer	
5 July 2024	15	MF	(India) Mobashir Rahman	(India) Jamshedpur	Free Transfer	
3 September 2024	16	DF	(India) Sarthak Golui	(India) Inter Kashi	Free Transfer	
4 September 2024	1	GK	(India) Kamaljit Singh	(India) Odisha FC	Free Transfer	
13 September 2024	20	FW	(India) VP Suhair	(India) Gokulam Kerala	Released	
13 September 2024	8	CM	(India) Edwin Sydney Vanspaul	(India) Chennaiyin	Released	

== Team ==
=== First-team squad ===
The below list contains the names and details of the players registered for the first-team squad for East Bengal. This list does not include any reserve player who has never played in the first-team squad.

As of 20 April 2025

No.	Name	Nat.	Pos.	Date of birth (age)	Signed from	Signed In	Contact Ends	Apps	Goals
Goalkeepers
13	Prabhsukhan Singh Gill	(India)	GK	2 January 2001 (age 25)	(India) Kerala Blasters	2023	2026	63	0
24	Debjit Majumder	(India)	GK	6 March 1988 (age 38)	(India) Chennaiyin	2024	2026	23	0
27	Aditya Patra	(India)	GK	27 April 2000 (age 26)	(India) Bengaluru	2022	2026	23	0
51	Kamaludheeen A. K.	(India)	GK	9 October 2004 (age 22)	(India) Kerala	2024	2027	0	0
Defenders
3	Provat Lakra	(India)	RB	12 August 1997 (age 29)	(India) Jamshedpur	2024	2026	16	0
4	Anwar Ali	(India)	CB	28 August 2000 (age 26)	(India) Delhi FC	2024	2029	22	1
5	Lalchungnunga	(India)	CB	25 December 2000 (age 25)	(India) Sreenidi Deccan	2022	2026	78	2
12	Mohammad Rakip	(India)	RB	14 May 2000 (age 26)	(India) Mumbai City	2022	2026	70	0
19	Hijazi Maher	(Jordan)	CB	20 September 1997 (age 29)	(Jordan) Al-Hussein	2023	2026	42	4
22	Nishu Kumar	(India)	LB	5 November 1997 (age 29)	(India) Kerala Blasters	2023	2025	44	1
33	Gursimrat Singh Gill	(India)	CB	2 November 1997 (age 29)	(India) Mumbai City	2023	2026	15	0
38	Hira Mondal	(India)	LB	31 August 1996 (age 30)	(India) NorthEast United	2024	2025	29	0
44	Héctor Yuste	(Spain)	CB	12 January 1988 (age 38)	(India) Mohun Bagan SG	2024	2025	25	0
63	Monotosh Chakladar	(India)	CB	4 April 1998 (age 28)	(India) Diamond Harbour	2024	2026	11	0
88	Mark Zothanpuia	(India)	LB	22 April 2002 (age 24)	(India) Hyderabad	2024	2027	11	0
Midfielders
6	Jeakson Singh	(India)	DM	21 June 2001 (age 25)	(India) Kerala Blasters	2024	2028	27	2
8	Madih Talal	(France)	AM	17 August 1997 (age 29)	(India) Punjab	2024	2026	17	3
21	Saúl Crespo	(Spain)	DM	23 July 1996 (age 30)	(India) Odisha	2023	2026	48	11
23	Souvik Chakrabarti	(India)	CM	12 July 1991 (age 35)	(India) Hyderabad	2022	2025	70	1
29	Naorem Mahesh Singh (vice–captain)	(India)	LW	1 March 1999 (age 27)	(India) Kerala Blasters	2022	2027	100	14
30	Vanlalpeka Guite	(India)	AM	26 October 2006 (age 20)	(India) Aizawl	2023	2026	8	1
35	Gunraj Singh Grewal	(India)	DM	9 January 2007 (age 19)	(India) Chandigarh FA	2023	2026	9	0
61	Tanmay Das	(India)	CM	2 May 2001 (age 25)	(India) Railway FC	2022	2027	30	2
62	Aman C. K.	(India)	RW	19 March 2003 (age 23)	(India) Mumbai City	2022	2026	36	10
66	Shyamal Besra	(India)	CM	25 September 2004 (age 22)	(India) Calcutta FC	2022	2027	17	4
80	Ajad Saheem T	(India)	AM	15 December 2002 (age 23)	(India) Golden Threads	2024	2026	7	1
82	P. V. Vishnu	(India)	AM	24 December 2001 (age 24)	(India) Muthoot FA	2023	2026	71	16
84	Sayan Banerjee	(India)	LW	14 January 2003 (age 23)	(India) Kalighat MS	2023	2026	30	6
Forwards
7	Richard Celis	(Venezuela)	FW	23 April 1996 (age 30)	(Venezuela) Academia Puerto Cabello	2025	2025	9	0
9	Dimitrios Diamantakos	(Greece)	FW	5 March 1993 (age 33)	(India) Kerala Blasters	2024	2026	28	9
10	Cleiton Silva (captain)	(Brazil)	FW	3 February 1987 (age 39)	(India) Bengaluru	2022	2025	80	27
11	Nandhakumar Sekar	(India)	FW	20 December 1995 (age 30)	(India) Odisha	2023	2026	55	12
14	David Lalhlansanga	(India)	FW	27 November 2001 (age 24)	(India) Mohammedan Sporting	2024	2027	25	6
59	Jesin TK	(India)	FW	19 February 2000 (age 26)	(India) Kerala United	2022	2026	37	21
28	Messi Bouli	(Cameroon)	FW	23 April 1992 (age 34)	(China) Shijiazhuang Gongfu	2025	2025	8	3

=== New contracts ===
No.	Pos.	Date	Name	Ref.
21	MF	11 June 2024	(Spain) Saúl Crespo	
10	FW	20 June 2024	(Brazil) Cleiton Silva	
19	MF	25 June 2024	(Jordan) Hijazi Maher	
12	DF	28 June 2024	(India) Mohammad Rakip	

=== Current technical staff ===
Position	Name
Head coach	(Spain) Óscar Bruzón
Assistant coach	(India) Bino George
Goalkeeping Coach	(Spain) Javier Pinillos
Strength & Conditioning Coach	(Spain) Javier Sánchez
Physiotherapist	—
Head of Football	(India) Thangboi Singto
Assistant Physiotherapist	(India) Tejas Lasalkar
Performance Analyst	(India) Aromal Vijayan
Team Manager	(India) Pratim Kumar Saha
Team Doctor	(India) Dr. Mustufa Poonawalla
Masseur	(India) Rajesh Basak
Masseur	(India) Robin Das

== Preseason and friendlies ==
East Bengal started their preseason under coach Carles Cuadrat on 3 July 2024 with six weeks in hand before the AFC Champions League Two preliminary match as the prime target. On 13 July, East Bengal played a friendly match against Kalighat MS and won 4–3. They then won 2–1 against Inter Kashi. However, they lost 1–3 to Army Red, with Dimitrios Diamantakos the only scorer for East Bengal.

=== Matches ===
Win Draw Loss

13 July 2023 Friendly	East Bengal	4–3	Kalighat MS	Kolkata
10:00 IST	Nandhakumar (?); Souvik (?); Ananthu NS (?)	Report	na	Stadium: East Bengal Ground; Attendance: 0 (Note: Closed door friendly match.)

20 July 2023 Friendly	East Bengal	2–1	Inter Kashi	Kolkata
18:00 IST	Mahesh (?); Lalhlansanga (?)	Report	Chirag Bhujel (?)	Stadium: Center of Excellence Ground; Attendance: 0

24 July 2023 Friendly	East Bengal	1–3	Army Red	Kolkata
09:00 IST	Diamantakos (?)	Report	na	Stadium: Center of Excellence Ground; Attendance: 0

=== Exhibition Match: Chief Minister's Cup ===
On 2 September 2024, East Bengal and Mohun Bagan Super Giant played an exhibition Kolkata Derby match for the promotion of football in the state of Uttar Pradesh at the K. D. Singh Babu Stadium, Lucknow. East Bengal lost 3–2 on penalties after the match ended 1–1 in regulation time with Suhail Bhat scoring first for Mohun Bagan Super Giant and Muhammed K. Ashique scoring the equaliser for East Bengal in the second half.

2 September 2024 Friendly	Mohun Bagan	1–1 (3–2 p)	East Bengal	Lucknow
18:00 IST	Bhat 18'	Report	Muhammed K. Ashique 71'; Banerjee (yellow card) 60' (yellow-red card) 79'	Stadium: K. D. Singh Babu Stadium; Referee: K. Ashwin
	Penalties
	Serto Worneilen Kom (penalty scored); Sibajit Singh (penalty missed); Adil Abdulla (penalty scored); Leewan Castanha (penalty missed); Ravi Bahadur Rana (penalty scored)		(penalty missed) Tanmay Das; (penalty missed) Vishnu; (penalty scored) Muhammed K. Ashique; (penalty missed) Muhammed Musharaf; (penalty scored) Chaku Mandi

== Competitions ==
=== Overall record ===
Competition	First match	Last match	Starting round	Final position	Record							
Competition	First match	Last match	Starting round	Final position	Pld	W	D	L	GF	GA	GD	Win %
AFC Champions League Two	14 August 2024		Preliminary round	Preliminary round	1	0	0	1	2	3	−1	0.00
Durand Cup	29 July 2024	21 August 2024	Group stage	Quarter-Final	4	2	1	1	7	4	+3	50.00
Indian Super League	14 September 2024	8 March 2025	Matchday 1	9th	24	8	4	12	27	33	−6	33.33
Super Cup	20 April 2025		Round of 16	Round of 16	1	0	0	1	0	1	−1	0.00
AFC Challenge League	26 October 2024	12 March 2025	Group stage	Quarter-final	5	2	1	2	10	7	+3	40.00
Calcutta Football League (Note: East Bengal fielded mostly their Reserve team for the tournament, with Bino George taking charge as the head coach.)	30 June 2024	13 February 2025	Round Robin	Winners	17	15	2	0	52	7	+45	88.24
Total					52	27	8	17	98	55	+43	51.92

Last updated: 20 April 2025
Source: Soccerway

=== AFC Champions League Two ===
East Bengal qualified for the 2024–25 AFC Champions League Two preliminary round after being champions of the 2024 Indian Super Cup. East Bengal faced Altyn Asyr of Turkmenistan in the preliminary round match on 14 August 2024 as the Salt Lake Stadium in a single-legged playoff match, however, they lost 3–2 with David Lalhlansanga and Saúl Crespo scoring for East Bengal. The winners progressed into the AFC Champions League Two group stages while East Bengal progressed to the 2024–25 AFC Challenge League group stage.

==== Matches ====
Win Draw Loss Void

14 August 2024 Preliminary round	(India) East Bengal	2–3	(Turkmenistan) Altyn Asyr	Kolkata
19:00 IST	David 7'; Souvik (yellow card) 27'; Lalchungnunga (yellow card) 45+5'; Saúl (yellow card) 58' (goal) 59'; Hijazi (yellow card) 60'	Report	Myrat 18'; Selim 28' (yellow card) 63'; Mihail 52'; Tajivew (yellow card) 65'; Myradow (yellow card) 65'; Mirsultanov (yellow card) 65'	Stadium: Salt Lake Stadium; Attendance: 27,892; Referee: (Australia) Alexander King

=== AFC Challenge League ===
East Bengal qualified for the 2024–25 AFC Challenge League group stages directly after losing to Altyn Asyr in the preliminary round of the 2024–25 AFC Champions League Two. On 22 August, the group stage draw was held at Kuala Lumpur, Malaysia and East Bengal was grouped in Group A along with hosts Paro from Bhutan, Bashundhara Kings from Bangladesh and Nejmeh from Lebanon with all matches of the group stage being played at the Changlimithang Stadium in Thimphu, Bhutan. On 26 October, East Bengal opened their campaign with a 2–2 draw against host Paro with Madih Talal and Dimitrios Diamantakos scoring for East Bengal. On 29 October, East Bengal faced Basundhara Kings and won 4–0 with goals from Dimitrios Diamantakos, Souvik Chakrabarti, Nandhakumar Sekar and Anwar Ali. On 1 November, East Bengal faced the Lebanon champions Nejmeh in a must win tie and won 3–2 with Dimitrios Diamantakos scoring a brace apart from an own goal from Baba Abdulai Musah as East Bengal finished top of the table to qualify for the quarter-finals of the tournament.

==== Group stage ====
Pos	Team	Pld	W	D	L	GF	GA	GD	Pts	Qualification	EAB	NJM	PAR	BSK
1	(India) East Bengal	3	2	1	0	9	4	+5	7	Advance to Quarter-finals		3–2	2–2	
2	(Lebanon) Nejmeh	3	2	0	1	5	4	+1	6					1–0
3	(Bhutan) Paro (H)	3	1	1	1	5	5	0	4			1–2		
4	(Bangladesh) Bashundhara Kings	3	0	0	3	1	7	−6	0		0–4		1–2	

Source: AFC
(H) Hosts

==== Knockout stage ====
Quarter-finals
E2	(Cambodia) Svay Rieng	6	1	7
D1	(Myanmar) Shan United	2	2	4
East Region
D2	(Chinese Taipei) Tainan City	0	0	0
E1	(Indonesia) Madura United	0	3	3
B2	(Kuwait) Al-Arabi (a.e.t.)	1	2	3
C1	(Oman) Al-Seeb	0	2	2
West Region
A1	(India) East Bengal	0	1	1
B1	(Turkmenistan) Arkadag	1	2	3

Semi-finals
(Cambodia) Svay Rieng	3	3	6
(Indonesia) Madura United	0	3	3
(Kuwait) Al-Arabi	2	0	2
(Turkmenistan) Arkadag	0	3	3

Final
(Cambodia) Svay Rieng	1
(Turkmenistan) Arkadag (a.e.t.)	2

==== Matches ====
Win Draw Loss Void

26 October 2024 Group stage	East Bengal (India)	2–2	(Bhutan) Paro	Thimphu, Bhutan
16:30 IST	Talal 5'; Maher (yellow card) 60'; Ali (yellow card) 63'; Lalchungnunga (yellow card) 68'; Diamantakos 69'; Silva (yellow card) 89'	Report	Opoku 9' (pen.) (yellow card) 38'; Marko Ivanovic (yellow card) 30'; Karma Chetrim (yellow card) 45'; Evans Asante 45+4'; Čupić (yellow card) 90+2'	Stadium: Changlimithang Stadium; Attendance: 3,800; Referee: (Jordan) Md. Mofeed Ghabayen

29 October 2024 Group stage	Bashundhara Kings (Bangladesh)	0–4	(India) East Bengal	Thimphu, Bhutan
20:30 IST	Figueira (yellow card) 90+5'	Report	Diamantakos 1'; Chakrabarti 20'; Sekar 26'; Ali 33'; Lalchungnunga (yellow card) 44'	Stadium: Changlimithang Stadium; Attendance: 200; Referee: (Bahrain) Mohamed Khaled Tarrar Deham

1 November 2024 Group stage	East Bengal (India)	3–2	(Lebanon) Nejmeh	Thimphu, Bhutan
16:30 IST	Musah 8' (o.g.); Diamantakos 15', 77' (pen.); Yuste (yellow card) 36'; Mahesh (yellow card) 80'; Gill (yellow card) 90+6'	Report	Zein (yellow card) 16'; Collins Opare 18'; Hussain Monther 43'; Ataya (yellow card) 90+4'	Stadium: Changlimithang Stadium; Attendance: 437; Referee: (Thailand) Songkran Bunmeekiart

5 March 2025 Quarter-final	East Bengal (India)	0–1	(Turkmenistan) Arkadag	Kolkata, India
19:00 IST	Messi Bouli (yellow card) 41'; Yuste (yellow card) 57'; Cleiton (yellow card) 89'	Report	Gurbanow 10'; Hojaýew (yellow card) 44'; Ballakow (yellow card) 79'; Ataýew (yellow card) 89'	Stadium: Salt Lake Stadium; Attendance: 25,497; Referee: (Qatar) Mohammed Ahmed Al Shammari

12 March 2025 Quarter-final	Arkadag (Turkmenistan)	2–1	(India) East Bengal	Arkadag, Turkmenistan
16:00 IST	Durdyýew (yellow card) 41'; Rejebow (yellow card) 45'; Saparow (yellow card) 55'; Annadurdyýew 89' (pen.), 90+8'; Çaryýew (yellow card) 90+3'; Beknazarow (yellow card) 90+5'	Report	Messi Bouli 1' (yellow card) 57'; Lalchungnunga (yellow card) 11' (yellow-red card) 33'	Stadium: Arkadag Stadium; Attendance: 10,000; Referee: (Lebanon) Sheikh Ahmad Alaeddin

=== Durand Cup ===
East Bengal participated in the 2024 Durand Cup and was grouped into Group A alongside Mohun Bagan Super Giant, Downtown Heroes and Indian Air Force and would play their group stage matches in Kolkata. East Bengal started their campaign on 29 July against Indian Air Force and won 3–1 with goals from David Lalhlansanga, Dimitrios Diamantakos and Saúl Crespo after conceding early in the first half. On 7 August, East Bengal faced Downtown Heroes in the second match of the campaign and won 3–1 again with goals from Madih Talal, Saúl Crespo and Jesin TK. On 18 August, East Bengal was supposed to face Mohun Bagan Super Giant in the Kolkata Derby match however, the game was cancelled due to security reasons and both teams were awarded a point each as East Bengal finished as one of the best runner-up to qualify for the quarterfinals of the Durand Cup. On 21 August, East Bengal faced Shillong Lajong in the quarter-final of the Durand Cup and suffered a 2–1 defeat. Brazilian forward Marcos Rudwere opened the scoring for Lajong, but Nandhakumar Sekar equalised for East Bengal. However, Figo Syndai scored the winner for Lajong as East Bengal was eliminated from the tournament.

==== Group stage ====
Pos	Team	Pld	W	D	L	GF	GA	GD	Pts	Qualification	MBG	EAB	DTH	IAF
1	Mohun Bagan (H)	3	2	1	0	7	0	+7	7	Advanced to knockout stage		CAN (Note: The match was cancelled by the organising body on security grounds and both teams were awarded 1 point each.)	1–0	6–0
2	East Bengal (H)	3	2	1	0	6	2	+4	7	Advanced to knockout stage			3–1	3–1
3	Downtown Heroes	3	1	0	2	3	4	−1	3					
4	Indian Air Force	3	0	0	3	1	11	−10	0				0–2	

Source: Twitter
Rules for classification: Group stage tiebreakers
(H) Hosts

==== Knockout stage ====
Quarter-finals
21 August – Kokrajhar
NorthEast United	2
Indian Army	0
21 August – Shillong
Shillong Lajong	2
East Bengal	1
23 August – Jamshedpur
Mohun Bagan	3(6)
Punjab	3(5)
23 August – Kolkata
Bengaluru	1
Kerala Blasters	0

Semi-finals
26 August – Shillong
NorthEast United	3
Shillong Lajong	0
27 August – Kolkata
Mohun Bagan	2(4)
Bengaluru	2(3)

Final
31 August – Kolkata
NorthEast United	2(4)
Mohun Bagan	2(3)

==== Matches ====
Win Draw Loss Void

29 July 2024 Group stage	East Bengal	3–1	Indian Air Force	Kolkata
19:00 IST	Lalhlansanga 43'; Chakrabarti (yellow card) 54'; Diamantakos 61'; Crespo 68'	Report	Naorem Somananda 19'; Mohammad Danish (yellow card) 30'	Stadium: Salt Lake Stadium; Attendance: 9,469; Referee: Aditya Purkayastha; Man of the Match: Madih Talal (East Bengal)

7 August 2024 Group stage	East Bengal	3–1	Downtown Heroes	Kolkata
19:00 IST	Talal 23'; Crespo 36' (pen.); Lalchungnunga (yellow card) 75'; Lalhlansanga (yellow card) 82'; Jesin 90+3'	Report	Aafreen Basharat Parray 28'; Zahid Yousif (yellow card) 50' (yellow-red card) 80'; Imad Ud Din (yellow card) 57'; Hyder Yousuf (yellow card) 57'; Shahmeer Tariq (yellow card) 75'; Atassi (yellow card) 90+1'; Zubair Ahad Akhoon (yellow card) 90+5'	Stadium: Kishore Bharati Krirangan; Attendance: 8,245; Referee: Williams Joy Koshy; Man of the Match: Madih Talal (East Bengal)

18 August 2024^{(KD)} Group stage	Mohun Bagan SG	cancelled	East Bengal	Kolkata
19:00 IST		Report		Stadium: Salt Lake Stadium; Referee: Harish Kundu
Note: Match was cancelled due to security reasons.

21 August 2024 Quarter—final	Shillong Lajong	2–1	East Bengal	Shillong
19:00 IST	Marcos 8'; Wahlang (yellow card) 10'; Kharbudon (yellow card) 54'; Aman (yellow card) 59'; Figo 84'; Goncalves (yellow card) 90+2'	Report	Crespo (yellow card) 33'; Talal (yellow card) 45'; Lalchungnunga (yellow card) 45+1'; Sekar 77'	Stadium: Jawaharlal Nehru Stadium; Attendance: 14,988; Referee: K Ramdasan; Man of the Match: Manas Dubey (Shillong Lajong)

=== Indian Super League ===
==== Summary ====
East Bengal began their Indian Super League campaign away from home against Bengaluru on 14 September at the Sree Kanteerava Stadium with a 1–0 defeat with Vinith Venkatesh scoring the solitary goal of the match while, East Bengal defender Lalchungnunga was sent off for double caution. On 22 September, East Bengal faced Kerala Blasters away at Kochi and lost 2–1 with P. V. Vishnu scoring for East Bengal, however East Bengal conceded twice and faced their second defeat of the campaign. On 27 September, East Bengal faced Goa at the Salt Lake Stadium and lost 2–3 with Madih Talal and David Lalhlansanga on the scoresheet for East Bengal while Borja Herrera scored a hattrick for Goa as East Bengal succumbed to a third straight defeat in the Indian Super League. On 30 September, coach Carles Cuadrat resigned as the head coach after a string of poor performance and Bino George had been appointed as the interim head coach.

On 5 October, under the tutelage of interim head coach Bino George, East Bengal faced Jamshedpur away at the JRD Tata Sports Complex and suffered a 2–0 defeat, making it four consecutive defeats in a row for the red and gold brigade. On 8 October, East Bengal announced Óscar Bruzón as the new head coach of the team until the end of the season. On 19 October, East Bengal faced Mohun Bagan SG at the Salt Lake Stadium and suffered their fifth straight defeat of the campaign as Mohun Bagan Super Giant won 2–0. On 22 October, East Bengal faced Odisha at the Kalinga Stadium in Bhubaneshwar and lost 2–1 with Dimitrios Diamantakos scoring for East Bengal, as they suffered their sixth consecutive defeats of the campaign.

==== League table ====
Pos	Team	Pld	W	D	L	GF	GA	GD	Pts
7	Odisha	24	8	9	7	44	37	+7	33
8	Kerala Blasters	24	8	5	11	33	37	−4	29
9	East Bengal	24	8	4	12	27	33	−6	28 (Note: Head-to-head points: East Bengal 6, Punjab 0.)
10	Punjab	24	8	4	12	34	38	−4	28
11	Chennaiyin	24	7	6	11	34	39	−5	27

Source: ISL
Rules for classification: 1) points; 2) goal difference; 3) number of goals scored; 4) head-to-head points; 5) head-to-head goal difference; 6) head-to-head goals scored; 7) fair play ranking; 8) drawing of lots
(Note: Head-to-head record is used only after all the matches between the teams in question have been played).

==== Result summary ====
Overall								Home						Away					
Pld	W	D	L	GF	GA	GD	Pts	W	D	L	GF	GA	GD	W	D	L	GF	GA	GD
24	8	4	12	27	33	−6	28	5	2	5	16	17	−1	3	2	7	11	16	−5

==== Results by match ====
Match	1	2	3	4	5	6	7	8	9	10	11	12	13	14	15	16	17	18	19	20	21	22	23	24
Ground	A	A	H	A	H	A	H	H	A	H	H	H	A	H	H	A	H	A	H	H	A	H	H	A
Result	L	L	L	L	L	L	D	W	W	L	W	W	D	L	L	L	W	D	L	W	W	W	D	L
Position	12	12	12	13	13	13	13	13	11	11	11	10	11	11	11	11	11	10	11	11	9	8	8	9

Updated to match(es) played on 8 March 2025. Source: indiansuperleague.com
A = Away; H = Home; W = Win; D = Draw; L = Loss

==== Matches ====
The league fixtures were announced on 25 August 2024, with the season starting on 13 September.

Win Draw Loss Void

14 September 2024 Round 1	Bengaluru	1–0	East Bengal	Bengaluru
19:30 IST	Venkatesh 25'; Roshan (yellow card) 82'; Wangjam (yellow card) 90+7'; Sandhu (yellow card) 90+7'	Report	Sekar (yellow card) 4'; Lalchungnunga (yellow card) 8' (yellow-red card) 87'; Yuste (yellow card) 22'; Maher (yellow card) 51'; Silva (yellow card) 87'	Stadium: Sree Kanteerava Stadium; Attendance: 11,923; Referee: Crystal John; Man of the Match: Vinith Venkatesh (Bengaluru)

22 September 2024 Round 2	Kerala Blasters	2–1	East Bengal	Kochi
19:30 IST	Drinčić (yellow card) 45+3'; Sadaoui 63'; Peprah 88'	Report	Mahesh (yellow card) 38'; Diamantakos (yellow card) 48'; Vishnu 59'; Crespo (yellow card) 63'; Silva (yellow card) 81'	Stadium: Jawaharlal Nehru Stadium; Attendance: 24,911; Referee: Tejas Nagvenkar; Man of the Match: Noah Sadaoui (Kerala Blasters)

27 September 2024 Round 3	East Bengal	2–3	Goa	Kolkata
19:30 IST	Talal 29'; Yuste (yellow card) 34'; Mahesh (yellow card) 45+2'; David 85'; Aman (yellow card) 90+4'	Report	Borja 13', 20', 71'; McHugh (yellow card) 43' (yellow-red card) 80'; Udanta (yellow card) 45+2'; Boris (yellow card) 90+2'	Stadium: Salt Lake Stadium; Attendance: 11,312; Referee: Ashwin; Man of the Match: Borja Herrera (Goa)

5 October 2024 Round 4	Jamshedpur	2–0	East Bengal	Jamshedpur
17:00 IST	Tachikawa 21'; Eze (yellow card) 30'; Lalchungnunga 70' (o.g.); Aniket (yellow card) 87'	Report	Nandha (yellow card) 15'; Cleiton (yellow card) 30'; Héctor (yellow card) 42'; Talal (yellow card) 67'	Stadium: JRD Tata Sports Complex; Attendance: 20,257; Referee: I Jamal Mohamed; Man of the Match: Albino Gomes (Jamshedpur)

19 October 2024^{(KD)} Round 5	East Bengal	0–2	Mohun Bagan Super Giant	Kolkata
19:30 IST	Souvik (yellow card) 36'; Provat (yellow card) 78'	Report	Jamie 41'; Apuia (yellow card) 48'; Alberto (yellow card) 57'; Petratos 89' (pen.); Jason Cummings (yellow card) 90+6'	Stadium: Salt Lake Stadium; Attendance: 59,782; Referee: Tejas Nagvenkar; Man of the Match: Greg Stewart (Mohun Bagan SG)

22 October 2024 Round 6	Odisha	2–1	East Bengal	Bhubaneshwar
19:30 IST	Roy Krishna 22'; Thoiba (yellow card) 45+2'; Mourtada 69'	Report	Hijazi (yellow card) 11'; Diamantakos 45+4' (pen.); Provat (yellow card) 68' (yellow-red card) 75'	Stadium: Kalinga Stadium; Attendance: 7,649; Referee: K Ramdasan; Man of the Match: Roy Krishna (Odisha)

9 November 2024 Round 7	East Bengal	0–0	Mohammedan	Kolkata
19:30 IST	Mahesh (yellow card) 7' (yellow-red card) 29'; Hijazi (yellow card) 15'; Nandhakumar (red card) 28'; Saúl (yellow card) 40'	Report	Amarjit (yellow card) 28'; Manzoki (yellow card) 90+2'	Stadium: Salt Lake Stadium; Attendance: 21,119; Referee: Harish Kundu; Man of the Match: Lalchungnunga (East Bengal)

29 November 2024 Round 8	East Bengal	1–0	NorthEast United	Kolkata
19:30 IST	Diamantakos 23'; Lalchungnunga (yellow card) 35' (yellow-red card) 87'; Saúl (yellow card) 69'; Rakip (yellow card) 74'; Gill (yellow card) 90'	Report	Mayakkannan (yellow card) 19'; Oram (yellow card) 69'; Bemammer (yellow card) 69' (yellow-red card) 72'	Stadium: Salt Lake Stadium; Attendance: 12,819; Referee: Rahul Kumar Gupta; Man of the Match: Madih Talal (East Bengal)

7 December 2024 Round 9	Chennaiyin	0–2	East Bengal	Chennai
17:00 IST	Renthlei (yellow card) 71'	Report	Vishnu 54'; Saúl (yellow card) 76'; Rakip (yellow card) 79'; Jeakson 84' (yellow card) 90+3'	Stadium: Jawaharlal Nehru Stadium; Attendance: 8,427; Referee: Crystal John; Man of the Match: P. V. Vishnu (East Bengal)

12 December 2024 Round 10	East Bengal	1–2	Odisha	Kolkata
19:30 IST	Jeakson (yellow card) 7' (yellow-red card) 43'; Lalchungnunga 53' (yellow card) 90+4'	Report	Thoiba (yellow card) 3'; Jerry (yellow card) 25' (goal) 56'; Boumous 80' (yellow card) 83'; Gama (yellow card) 84'; Khawlhring (yellow card) 87'	Stadium: Salt Lake Stadium; Attendance: 13,422; Referee: Tejas Nagvenkar; Man of the Match: Isak Vanlalruatfela (Odisha)

17 December 2024 Round 11	East Bengal	4–2	Punjab	Kolkata
19:30 IST	Nandha (yellow card) 14'; Hijazi 46'; Vishnu 54' (yellow card) 74'; Suresh 60' (o.g.); David 67'	Report	Asmir 21'; Vidal 39'; Lhungdim (yellow card) 45+3' (yellow-red card) 43'	Stadium: Salt Lake Stadium; Attendance: 9,989; Referee: Aditya Purkayastha; Man of the Match: David Lalhlansanga (East Bengal)

21 December 2024 Round 12	East Bengal	1–0	Jamshedpur	Kolkata
19:30 IST	Diamantakos 60'; Souvik (yellow card) 77'; David (yellow card) 88'; Yuste (yellow card) 90+1'	Report	Sourav (yellow card) 11'; Pronay (yellow card) 21'; Imran (yellow card) 72'; Shubham (yellow card) 90+4'	Stadium: Salt Lake Stadium; Attendance: 16,564; Referee: Harish Kundu; Man of the Match: PV Vishnu (East Bengal)

28 December 2024 Round 13	Hyderabad	1–1	East Bengal	Hyderabad
17:00 IST	Jeakson 64'	Report	Manoj 90'	Stadium: G.M.C. Balayogi Athletic Stadium; Attendance: 1,463; Referee: K Ramdasan; Man of the Match: Edmilson Correia (Hyderabad)

6 January 2025 Round 14	East Bengal	2–3	Mumbai City	Kolkata
19:30 IST	Jeakson (yellow card) 38'; Vishnu (yellow card) 49'; Lalchungnunga (yellow card) 65'; Sahil 66' (o.g.); Gill (yellow card) 79'; David 83'; Anwar (yellow card) 90+3'; Souvik (yellow card) 90+4'	Report	Sahil (yellow card) 24'; Chhangte 39'; Karelis 43', 87'; Vikram (yellow card) 73'	Stadium: Salt Lake Stadium; Attendance: 16,899; Referee: Rahul Kumar Gupta; Man of the Match: Lallianzuala Chhangte (Mumbai City)

11 January 2025^{(KD)} Round 15	Mohun Bagan Super Giant	1–0	East Bengal	Guwahati
19:30 IST	Maclaren 2'; Rai (yellow card) 30'	Report	Souvik (yellow card) 39' (yellow-red card) 64'; Nishu (yellow card) 50'; Lalchungnunga (yellow card) 59'	Stadium: Indira Gandhi Athletic Stadium; Attendance: 2,567; Referee: Venkatesh Ramachandran; Man of the Match: Jamie Maclaren (Mohun Bagan SG)

19 January 2025 Round 16	Goa	1–0	East Bengal	Fatorda
19:30 IST	Brison 13'; Sahil (yellow card) 23'; Sadiku (red card) 90+3'	Report	Jeakson (yellow card) 50'; Sayan (yellow card) 90+5'; Nandha (yellow card) 90+8'	Stadium: Jawaharlal Nehru Stadium; Attendance: 10,832; Referee: Crystal John; Man of the Match: Sandesh Jhingan (Goa)

24 January 2025 Round 17	East Bengal	2–1	Kerala Blasters	Kolkata
19:30 IST	Vishnu 20'; Celis (yellow card) 70'; Hijazi Maher 72'; Jeakson (yellow card) 83'	Report	Hormipam (yellow card) 40'; Freddy (yellow card) 69'; Danish 84'	Stadium: Salt Lake Stadium; Attendance: 14,431; Referee: Ashwin; Man of the Match: PV Vishnu (East Bengal)

31 January 2025 Round 18	Mumbai City	0–0	East Bengal	Mumbai
19:30 IST	Souvik (yellow card) 41'; Diamantakos (yellow card) 45'; Nandha (yellow card) 73'; Celis (yellow card) 75'	Report	Chhangte (yellow card) 75'; Vikram (yellow card) 89'	Stadium: Mumbai Football Arena; Attendance: 2,068; Referee: Harish Kundu; Man of the Match: Naorem Mahesh Singh (East Bengal)

8 February 2025 Round 19	East Bengal	0–3	Chennaiyin	Kolkata
19:30 IST	Lalchungnunga (yellow card) 90+3' (yellow-red card) 90+4'	Report	Kumar 13' (o.g.); Gil 21'; Laldinpuia (yellow card) 41'; Choudhary (yellow card) 72'; Nassiri (yellow card) 90+2'; Elsinho (yellow card) 90+6'; Chukwu 90+9'	Stadium: Salt Lake Stadium; Attendance: 16,791; Referee: Rahul Kumar Gupta; Man of the Match: Wilmar Jordan Gil (Chennaiyin)

16 February 2025 Round 20	Mohammedan	1–3	East Bengal	Kolkata
19:30 IST	Alexis (yellow card) 45+2'; França 68'	Report	Mahesh 27'; Crespo 65'; Rakip (yellow card) 72'; Vishnu (yellow card) 87'; David 89'; Lakra (yellow card) 90+6'	Stadium: Salt Lake Stadium; Attendance: 6,126; Referee: Crystal John; Man of the Match: Naorem Mahesh Singh (East Bengal)

22 February 2025 Round 21	Punjab	1–3	East Bengal	Delhi
19:30 IST	Novoselec (yellow card) 36'; Vidal (yellow card) 51' (goal) 62'	Report	Diamantakos 15'; Mahesh 47'; Lalchungnunga 54'; Messi (yellow card) 60'; Lakra (yellow card) 90+9'	Stadium: Jawaharlal Nehru Stadium; Attendance: 2,606; Referee: Venkatesh R Man of the Match: Lalchungnunga (East Bengal)

26 February 2025 Round 22	East Bengal	2–0	Hyderabad	Kolkata
19:30 IST	Lalchungnunga (yellow card) 21'; Manoj 86' (o.g.); Messi 90+4'	Report	Saji (yellow card) 37'	Stadium: Salt Lake Stadium; Attendance: 9,987; Referee: Senthil Nathan S Man of the Match: Raphaël Messi Bouli (East Bengal)

2 March 2025 Round 23	East Bengal	1–1	Bengaluru	Kolkata
19:30 IST	Messi 11' (yellow card) 48'; Lakra (yellow card) 41'; Diamantakos (red card) 45+2'; Celis (yellow card) 90+1'	Report	Namgyal Bhutia (yellow card) 43'; Noguera (yellow card) 45+2'; Venkatesh (yellow card) 64'; Chhetri 90+1' (pen.)	Stadium: Salt Lake Stadium; Attendance: 17,964; Referee: Harish Kundu; Man of the Match: Souvik Chakrabarti (East Bengal)

8 March 2025 Round 24	NorthEast United	4–0	East Bengal	Shillong
17:00 IST	Dinesh (yellow card) 21'; Néstor 59'; Ajaraie 65', 79' (pen.); Bemammer 89'	Report	Suman (yellow card) 51'; Tanmay (yellow card) 65' (yellow-red card) 83'	Stadium: Jawaharlal Nehru Stadium; Attendance: 9,927; Referee: Aditya Purkayastha; Man of the Match: Alaaeddine Ajaraie (NorthEast United)

=== Super Cup (April) ===
==== Bracket ====
Round of 16
20 April
8	Kerala Blasters	2
9	East Bengal	0
21 April
2	Goa	3
IL4	Gokulam Kerala	0
21 April
7	Odisha	0
10	Punjab	3
23 April
3	Bengaluru	1 (3)
IL2	Inter Kashi (p)	1 (5)
23 April
6	Mumbai City	4
11	Chennaiyin	0
24 April
4	Northeast United	6
13	Mohammedan	0
24 April
5	Jamshedpur	2
12	Hyderabad	0

Quarter-finals
26 April
8	Kerala Blasters	1
1	Mohun Bagan	2
26 April
2	Goa	2
10	Punjab	1
27 April
IL2	Inter Kashi	0
6	Mumbai City	1
27 April
4	Northeast United	0 (4)
5	Jamshedpur (p)	0 (5)

Semi-finals
30 April
1	Mohun Bagan	1
2	Goa	3
30 April
6	Mumbai City	0
5	Jamshedpur	1

Final
3 May
2	Goa	3
5	Jamshedpur	0

==== Matches ====
Win Draw Loss Void

20 April 2025 Round of 16	Kerala Blasters	2–0	East Bengal	Bhubaneshwar
16:30 IST	Hormipam (yellow card) 24'; Jiménez 40' (pen.); Sadaoui 64'; Yumnam (yellow card) 75'	Report	Diamantakos (yellow card) 39'	Stadium: Kalinga Stadium; Attendance: 4,367; Referee: Aditya Purkayastha; Man of the Match: Noah Sadaoui (Kerala Blasters)

=== Calcutta Football League ===
East Bengal participated in the 2024 Calcutta Premier Division and was drawn into group B for the first phase of the tournament where twenty-six teams were divided into two groups of thirteen. East Bengal fielded mostly the reserve squad led by head coach Bino George for the Calcutta Football League like the previous two seasons. East Bengal started the campaign on 30 June against Tollygunge Agragami at the Barrackpore Stadium and won 7–1, equaling a 46-year-old record of scoring the most goals in the opening fixture of the Calcutta Football League since a 7–0 win over Police AC back in 1978. Jesin TK, Shyamal Besra, Aman C. K., Subrata Murmu, Ananthu N. S. and Sayan Banerjee scored the goals for East Bengal. On 7 July, East Bengal faced George Telegraph at the East Bengal Ground and won 3–1 with goals from Jesin TK and Sayan Banerjee, who scored a brace, thus making it two wins from the first two matches of the campaign. On 13 July, East Bengal faced arch-rivals Mohun Bagan SG at the Salt Lake Stadium and won 2–1 with goals from P. V. Vishnu and Jesin TK, making it three consecutive wins in three matches of the Calcutta League campaign. On 16 July, East Bengal faced Calcutta Customs at the Bankimanjali Stadium in Naihati and was held onto a goalless draw, hence dropping the first points of the campaign. On 19 July, East Bengal faced Police AC and won 6–0 with goals from Jesin TK, Sayan Banerjee, P. V. Vishnu, Shyamal Besra and Aman CK. On 24 July, East Bengal faced Railway FC and won 2–0 with goals from Muhammed Musharaf and Adil Amal. On 9 August, East Bengal faced Eastern Railway and won 3–0 with goals from Muhammed Musharaf, Aman C.K. and Jesin TK. On 12 August, East Bengal faced Bhawanipore and won 1–0 with a solitary penalty goal from Jesin TK to continue the unbeaten run and solidify the top spot in the group. On 17 August, East Bengal faced Kalighat Sports Lovers Association and won 4–0 with goals from Jesin TK, Ajad Saheem T and Edwin Sydney Vanspaul, who scored a brace as East Bengal confirmed their spot for the Super-six phase. On 20 August, East Bengal faced ASOS Rainbow and won 2–0 with goals from Sanjib Ghosh and Muhammed K. Ashique as East Bengal continued the winning streak. On 25 August, East Bengal faced Peerless in the penultimate match of the group phase and won 2–1 with goals from Muhammed K. Ashique and Jesin TK and thus confirming top spot in Group B with a match in hand. On 6 September, East Bengal played the final match of the group phase against Calcutta Police Club and won 3–0 with goals from Bathala Sunil, Tanmay Das and Sayan Banerjee, as East Bengal remained undefeated and topped the group.

On 12 September, East Bengal faced Calcutta Customs in the first match of the Super-Six phase and won 4–1 with P.V. Vishnu scoring a brace and the other two being scored by Shyamal Besra and Adil Amal. On 17 September, East Bengal faced Suruchi Sangha in the second match of the super-six phase and won 5–0 with Aman CK scoring a brace while P. V. Vishnu, Jesin TK, and Muhammed Roshal scored the other three. On 20 September, East Bengal faced Mohammedan and played a 2–2 draw at the Bankimanjali Stadium in Naihati with Jesin scoring a brace for East Bengal, however, East Bengal lodged a complaint to the IFA stating that Mohammedan broke the "son of the soil" rule of fielding at least four players of Bengal origin for the entirety of the match. Hence, IFA granted all three points to East Bengal from the match. However, after some controversy regarding the allotment of full points and Diamond Harbour threatening to pull out of the tournament, the IFA on 28 October announced that only a monetary fine would be imposed on Mohammedan and no points would be awarded or deducted from the disputed match. On 15 February 2025, after a lot of debacle, the IFA organised the final title decider match between East Bengal and Diamond Harbour, however, Diamond Harbour did not show up for the match and East Bengal were set to be given a walkover and announced as champions. However, Diamond Harbour management went to court and filed for a stay order and on 19 February 2025 the district court issued an interim injunction in favor of Diamond Harbour, which provided a temporary halt to the championship declaration. Finally, on 19 September 2025, the Calcutta High Court overruled the stay order issued by the district court and stated that there is no obstacle to declaring East Bengal champions of 2024 Calcutta Football League. On 20 September 2025, the Indian Football Association officially announced East Bengal as the champions of the 2024 Calcutta Football League.

==== League table ====
===== Group B =====
Pos	Team	Pld	W	D	L	GF	GA	GD	Pts	Qualification
1	East Bengal	12	11	1	0	35	4	+31	34	Qualified for the Super Six round
2	Bhawanipore	12	10	1	1	35	4	+31	31	Qualified for the Super Six round
3	Calcutta Customs	12	7	3	2	22	13	+9	24	Qualified for the Super Six round
4	Peerless	12	6	1	5	20	14	+6	19	
5	Kalighat SLA	12	6	1	5	21	17	+4	19	

Source: The Away End
Rules for classification: 1) points; 2) head-to-head points; 3) head-to-head goal difference; 4) goal difference; 5) number of goals scored; 6) drawing of lots

===== Super Six =====
Pos	Team	Pld	W	D	L	GF	GA	GD	Pts	Qualification
1	East Bengal^{ISL} (C)	17	15	2	0	52	7	+45	47	Champions
2	Diamond Harbour^{IL2}	17	12	3	2	39	14	+25	39	
3	Bhawanipore	17	11	3	3	38	13	+25	36	
4	Calcutta Customs	17	8	5	4	32	25	+7	29	
5	Suruchi Sangha	17	8	4	5	23	22	+1	28	
6	Mohammedan^{ISL}	17	7	5	5	33	20	+13	26	

Source: The Away End
Rules for classification: 1) points; 2) goal difference; 3) number of goals scored; 4) head-to-head points; 5) head-to-head goal difference; 6) fair play ranking; 7) drawing of lots
(C) Champions

==== Matches ====
Win Draw Loss Void

30 June 2024 1	East Bengal	7–1	Tollygunge Agragami	Barrackpore
15:00 IST	Shyamal Besra 12'; Muhammed Roshal PP (yellow card) 22'; Aman 43'; Jesin 65' (pen.), 67'; Subrata Murmu 79'; Ananthu N.S. 87'; Banerjee 90+2'	Report	Firoj Ali (yellow card) 17'; Sanjay Sharma 47'; Bhawani Jaiswar (yellow card) 48'; Sanju Santra (yellow card) 49'; Malsawmkima Chhangte (yellow card) 65'	Stadium: Bibhutibhushan Krirangan; Attendance: 5,000; Referee: Dipu Roy; Man of the Match: Sayan Banerjee (East Bengal)

7 July 2024 2	George Telegraph	1–3	East Bengal	Kolkata
15:00 IST	Amit Ekka 34'; Rakes Karmakar (yellow card) 40'	Report	Jesin 47'; Banerjee 66', 90'	Stadium: East Bengal Ground; Attendance: 5,000; Referee: Dipak Singha; Man of the Match: Sayan Banerjee (East Bengal)

13 July 2024 3	Mohun Bagan SG	1–2	East Bengal	Kolkata
15:15 IST	Bhat 90+6'	Report	Aman (yellow card) 43'; Joseph Justin (yellow card) 46' (yellow-red card) 77'; Vishnu 51'; Jesin 65'; Majumder (yellow card) 90+5'	Stadium: Salt Lake Stadium; Attendance: 26,000; Referee: Pranjal Banerjee; Man of the Match: P. V. Vishnu (East Bengal)

16 July 2024 4	Calcutta Customs	0–0	East Bengal	Naihati
15:00 IST	Batas Murmu (yellow card) 74'; Sen (yellow card) 90+5'; Ranojoy Samanta (yellow card) 90+6'	Report	Sanjib Ghosh (yellow card) 32'; Banerjee (yellow card) 67'	Stadium: Bankimanjali Stadium; Attendance: 1,549; Referee: Rabin Biswas; Man of the Match: Naseeb Rahman (East Bengal)

19 July 2024 5	Police AC	0–6	East Bengal	Kolkata
15:00 IST	Avijit Pradhan (yellow card) 24'; Samray Hansda (yellow card) 32'	Report	Banerjee 17'; Joseph Justin (yellow card) 25'; Vishnu 41'; Shyamal Besra 64'; Jesin 67', 72'; Aman 83'	Stadium: East Bengal Ground; Attendance: 3,000; Referee: Bimalendu Mondal; Man of the Match: Sayan Banerjee (East Bengal)

24 July 2024 6	Railway	0–2	East Bengal	Kolkata
15:00 IST	Mithun Saha (yellow card) 73'	Report	Muhammed Musharaf 45+2'; Adil Amal 69'; Ananthu N. S. (yellow card) 85'	Stadium: East Bengal Ground; Attendance: 1,800; Referee: Dipu Roy; Man of the Match: Jesin TK (East Bengal)

9 August 2024 7	Eastern Railway	0–3	East Bengal	Kolkata
15:00 IST	Swarup Sarkar (yellow card) 43'	Report	Muhammed Musharaf 33'; Aman C. K. 42'; Jesin TK 78'; Ananthu N.S. (yellow card) 88'	Stadium: East Bengal Ground; Attendance: 1,000; Referee: Dipu Roy; Man of the Match: Jesin TK (East Bengal)

12 August 2024 8	Bhawanipore	0–1	East Bengal	Kolkata
15:00 IST	Umer Muhthar KP (yellow card) 80'	Report	Jesin 7' (pen.) (yellow card) 19'; Suman Dey (yellow card) 36'; Muhammed Roshal PP (yellow card) 47'	Stadium: East Bengal Ground; Attendance: 1,500; Referee: Tanumay Sarkar; Man of the Match: Aditya Patra (East Bengal)

17 August 2024 9	East Bengal	4–0	Kalighat Sports Lovers Association	Kolkata
15:00 IST	Jesin TK 26' (yellow card) 68'; Vanspaul 56', 79'; Chaku Mandi (yellow card) 67'; Ajad 75'	Report	Bisal Chhetri (yellow card) 65'	Stadium: East Bengal Ground; Attendance: 3,000; Referee: Tarun Kumar Biswas; Man of the Match: Edwin Sydney Vanspaul (East Bengal)

20 August 2024 10	ASOS Rainbow	0–2	East Bengal	Kolkata
15:00 IST	Soubik Bal (yellow card) 16'; Enjamul Hoque (yellow card) 24'; Rajon Barman (yellow card) 61'; Shilton Paul (yellow card) 71'	Report	Sanjib Ghosh 74'; Muhammed K. Ashique 90+4'	Stadium: East Bengal Ground; Attendance: 2,000; Referee: Bimalendu Mondal; Man of the Match: Sanjib Ghosh (East Bengal)

25 August 2024 11	East Bengal	2–1	Peerless	Kolkata
13:00 IST	Aman (yellow card) 63'; Muhammad K. Ashique 77'; Jesin 83'; Abinash Shagolsem (yellow card) 90+5'	Report	Amar Nath Baskey (yellow card) 63'; Damanbhalang Chyne 87'	Stadium: East Bengal Ground; Attendance: 1,000; Referee: Mithun Kumar Kundu; Man of the Match: Jesin TK (East Bengal)

6 September 2024 12	Calcutta Police Club	0–3	East Bengal	Kolkata
15:00 IST	Pritam Kundu (yellow card) 26'	Report	Bathala Sunil 5'; Tanmay Das 35'; Jesin (penalty missed) 69'; Banerjee 88'	Stadium: East Bengal Ground; Attendance: 2,000; Referee: Tanumoy Sarkar; Man of the Match: Sayan Banerjee (East Bengal)

12 September 2024 Super 6	East Bengal	4–1	Calcutta Customs	Kolkata
15:00 IST	Chaku Mandi (yellow card) 13'; Aman (yellow card) 20'; Naseeb Rahman (yellow card) 24'; Shyamal Besra 45'; Vishnu 45+2', 51'; Adil Amal 73'; Muhammed Roshal PP (yellow card) 89'; Jesin (yellow card) 90+3'	Report	Paritosh Seal (yellow card) 21'; Robi 25'; Batas Murmu (yellow card) 39'; Rudranath Samanta (yellow card) 90+1'	Stadium: East Bengal Ground; Attendance: 500; Referee: Surojit Das; Man of the Match: PV Vishnu (East Bengal)

17 September 2024 Super 6	East Bengal	5–0	Suruchi Sangha	Kolkata
15:00 IST	Aman 9', 41'; Vishnu 16'; Jesin 26'; Sanjib Ghosh (yellow card) 54'; Muhammed Roshal PP 73'	Report		Stadium: East Bengal Ground; Attendance: 700; Referee: Rohan Das Gupta; Man of the Match: Aman C. K. (East Bengal)

20 September 2024 Super 6	Mohammedan	2–2	East Bengal	Naihati
15:00 IST	Dinesh Meitei (yellow card) 16'; Bamiya Samad 21'; Soraisam Robinson Singh 51'; Dipu Halder (yellow card) 81'; Shubhadip Pandit (yellow card) 90+4'	Report	Aman (yellow card) 32'; Jesin 40', 77'	Stadium: Bankimanjali Stadium; Attendance: 2,000; Referee: Dipu Roy; Man of the Match: Soraisam Robinson Singh (Mohammedan SC)

TBD Super 6	Bhawanipore	0–3 (Note: Walkover)	East Bengal
Note: Bhawanipore decided not to field a team hence, East Bengal was awarded a walkover.

13 February 2025 Super 6	East Bengal	3–0 (Note: Walkover)	Diamond Harbour	Kolkata
14:00 IST		Report		Stadium: Kishore Bharati Krirangan
Note: Diamond Harbour decided not to field a team hence, East Bengal was awarded a walkover.

== Statistics ==
=== Appearances ===
Players with no appearances are not included in the list.

As of 20 April 2025

Appearances for East Bengal in 2024–25 season
No.	Pos.	Nat.	Name	Durand Cup		Indian Super League		Super Cup		AFC CL Two		AFC Challenge League		Calcutta League		Total	
No.	Pos.	Nat.	Name	Apps	Starts	Apps	Starts	Apps	Starts	Apps	Starts	Apps	Starts	Apps	Starts	Apps	Starts
Goalkeepers
13	GK	(India)	Prabhsukhan Singh Gill	3	3	21	21	1	1	1	1	5	5	—		31	31
24	GK	(India)	Debjit Majumder	0	0	4	3	0	0	0	0	0	0	1	1	5	4
27	GK	(India)	Aditya Patra	0	0	0	0	0	0	0	0	0	0	14	14	14	14
71	GK	(India)	Sangramjit Roy Chowdhury	—										1	0	1	0
Defenders
3	RB	(India)	Provat Lakra	1	1	13	7	—		0	0	2	1	—		16	9
4	CB	(India)	Anwar Ali	—		18	17	1	1	3	3	—		—		22	21
5	CB	(India)	Lalchungnunga	3	3	18	16	1	1	1	1	5	4	—		28	25
12	RB	(India)	Mohammad Rakip	2	2	15	15	1	1	1	1	3	2	—		22	21
16	CB	(India)	Sarthak Golui	—										3	2	3	2
19	CB	(Jordan)	Hijazi Maher	3	3	13	13	—		1	1	3	3	—		20	20
22	RB	(India)	Nishu Kumar	0	0	13	8	1	0	0	0	1	0	—		15	8
33	CB	(India)	Gursimrat Singh Gill	3	0	1	0	—		0	0	0	0	—		4	0
38	LB	(India)	Hira Mondal	—		1	1	—						12	12	13	13
44	CB	(Spain)	Héctor Yuste	1	0	18	16	1	1	0	0	5	5	—		25	22
54	CB	(India)	Adil Amal	—										8	6	8	6
57	CB	(India)	Bathala Sunil	—										7	6	7	6
60	LB	(India)	Tonmoy Ghosh	—										3	2	3	2
63	CB	(India)	Monotosh Chakladar	0	0	0	0	—		0	0	0	0	10	9	10	9
74	RB	(India)	Bunando Singh Khangembam	—										1	1	1	1
81	RM	(India)	Suman Dey	—		1	1	0	0	—				6	4	7	5
85	CB	(India)	Chaku Mandi	—		1	1	0	0	—				6	6	7	7
88	LB	(India)	Mark Zothanpuia	3	3	7	3	0	0	1	1	—		0	0	12	8
90	CB	(India)	Justin Joseph	—										7	5	7	5
Midfielders
6	CM	(India)	Jeakson Singh	2	2	18	12	1	1	1	0	5	3	—		27	18
8	AM	(France)	Madih Talal	3	3	10	9	—		1	1	3	3	—		17	16
8	CM	(India)	Edwin Sydney Vanspaul	—										8	7	8	7
21	CM	(Spain)	Saúl Crespo	3	3	13	12	1	0	1	1	5	5	—		23	21
23	CM	(India)	Souvik Chakrabarti	2	2	20	18	1	0	1	1	4	4	—		28	25
29	LW	(India)	Naorem Mahesh Singh	3	2	20	16	1	1	1	1	5	5	—		30	25
53	CM	(India)	Ananthu N. S.	—		1	0	—						6	0	7	0
58	LW	(India)	Sanjib Ghosh	—										12	7	12	7
61	CM	(India)	Tanmay Das	1	0	1	1	—		0	0	—		15	15	17	17
62	LW	(India)	Aman C. K.	2	0	5	0	—		1	0	—		13	11	21	11
64	CM	(India)	Naseeb Rahman	—								0	0	7	6	7	6
66	CM	(India)	Shyamal Besra	0	0	0	0	—				0	0	10	7	10	7
68	AM	(India)	Kush Chhetry	—										2	0	2	0
78	LW	(India)	Muhammed K. Ashique	—										5	0	5	0
79	RW	(India)	Abinash Shagolsem	—										2	0	2	0
80	AM	(India)	Ajad Saheem T	1	0	—				0	0	—		6	2	7	2
82	AM	(India)	P. V. Vishnu	3	1	22	16	1	1	1	0	4	0	9	8	40	26
84	LW	(India)	Sayan Banerjee	0	0	8	0	—				0	0	12	8	20	8
86	RW	(India)	Muhammed Roshal PP	—		1	0	—						9	4	10	4
87	RW	(India)	Bijay Murmu	—										5	1	5	1
89	LW	(India)	Muhammed Musharaf	—										11	7	11	7
Forwards
7	FW	(Venezuela)	Richard Celis	—		6	4	1	1	—		2	2	—		9	7
9	FW	(Greece)	Dimitrios Diamantakos	2	1	19	18	1	1	1	0	5	5	—		28	25
10	FW	(Brazil)	Cleiton Silva	1	0	18	11	—		1	0	5	0	—		25	11
11	FW	(India)	Nandhakumar Sekar	1	1	18	14	1	0	1	1	3	3	—		24	19
14	FW	(India)	David Lalhlansanga	3	3	17	6	1	0	1	1	2	0	1	1	25	11
20	FW	(India)	V. P. Suhair	—		0	0	—						4	2	4	2
28	FW	(Cameroon)	Messi Bouli	—		5	4	1	1	—		2	2	—		8	7
59	FW	(India)	Jesin TK	2	0	4	1	—				0	0	14	13	20	14
70	FW	(India)	Avishek Kunjam	—										2	0	2	0
72	FW	(India)	Subrata Murmu	—										6	0	6	0

=== Goal scorers ===
As of 12 March 2025

Rank	No.	Pos.	Nat.	Name	Durand Cup	Indian Super League	Super Cup	AFC CL Two	AFC Challenge League	Calcutta League	Total
1	59	FW	(India)	Jesin TK	1	0	—		0	13	14
2	9	FW	(Greece)	Dimitrios Diamantakos	1	4	—	0	4	—	9
2	82	FW	(India)	P. V. Vishnu	0	4	—	0	0	5	9
4	14	FW	(India)	David Lalhlansanga	1	4	—	1	0	—	6
5	62	LW	(India)	Aman C. K.	0	0	—	0	—	5	5
5	84	LW	(India)	Sayan Banerjee	0	0	—		0	5	5
7	21	CM	(Spain)	Saúl Crespo	2	1	—	1	0	—	4
8	8	AM	(France)	Madih Talal	1	1	—	0	1	—	3
8	66	CM	(India)	Shyamal Besra	0	0	—		0	3	3
8	28	CF	(Cameroon)	Messi Bouli	—	2	—	—	1	—	3
11	5	DF	(India)	Lalchungnunga	0	2	—	0	0	—	2
11	6	CM	(India)	Jeakson Singh Thounaojam	0	2	—	0	0	—	2
11	8	CM	(India)	Edwin Sydney Vanspaul	0	—				2	2
11	11	FW	(India)	Nandhakumar Sekar	1	0	—	0	1	—	2
11	19	CB	(Jordan)	Hijazi Maher	0	2	—	0	0	—	2
11	29	LW	(India)	Naorem Mahesh Singh	0	2	—	0	0	—	2
11	54	CB	(India)	Adil Amal	—					2	2
11	78	LW	(India)	Muhammed K. Ashique	—					2	2
11	89	LW	(India)	Muhammed Musharaf	—					2	2
20	4	DF	(India)	Anwar Ali	—	0	—	—	1	—	1
20	23	CM	(India)	Souvik Chakrabarti	0	0	—	0	1	—	1
20	53	CM	(India)	Ananthu N. S.	—					1	1
20	57	CB	(India)	Bathala Sunil	—					1	1
20	58	RW	(India)	Sanjib Ghosh	—					1	1
20	61	CM	(India)	Tanmay Das	0	0	—	0	—	1	1
20	72	FW	(India)	Subrata Murmu	—					1	1
20	80	AM	(India)	Ajad Saheem T	0	—				1	1
20	86	RW	(India)	Muhammed Roshal PP	—					1	1
Own Goals					0	3	—	0	1	0	4
Total					7	27	0	2	9	46	91

=== Assists ===
As of 12 March 2025

Rank	No.	Pos.	Nat.	Name	Durand Cup	Indian Super League	Super Cup	AFC CL Two	AFC Challenge League	Calcutta League	Total
1	59	FW	(India)	Jesin TK	0	0	—		0	8	8
2	82	FW	(India)	P. V. Vishnu	1	4	—	0	0	1	6
3	21	CM	(Spain)	Saúl Crespo	0	4	—	0	1	—	5
4	8	AM	(France)	Madih Talal	1	1	—	0	2	—	4
4	38	LB	(India)	Hira Mondal	—					4	4
4	61	CM	(India)	Tanmay Das	0	0	—	0	—	4	4
4	84	LW	(India)	Sayan Banerjee	0	0	—		0	4	4
7	9	FW	(Greece)	Dimitrios Diamantakos	1	1	—	1	0	—	3
7	11	LW	(India)	Nandhakumar Sekar	0	2	—	0	1	—	3
7	58	RW	(India)	Sanjib Ghosh	—					3	3
7	62	LW	(India)	Aman C. K.	0	0	—	0	—	3	3
12	10	FW	(Brazil)	Cleiton Silva	0	2	—	0	0	—	2
12	29	LW	(India)	Naorem Mahesh Singh	0	1	—	0	1	—	2
12	78	LW	(India)	Muhammed K. Ashique	—					2	2
12	87	RW	(India)	Bijay Murmu	0	—				2	2
12	89	LW	(India)	Muhammed Musharaf	—					2	2
16	3	RB	(India)	Provat Lakra	0	1	—	0	0	—	1
16	5	CB	(India)	Lalchungnunga	0	0	—	0	1	—	1
16	14	FW	(India)	David Lalhlansanga	0	1	—	0	0	0	1
16	16	CB	(India)	Sarthak Golui	—					1	1
16	28	FW	(Cameroon)	Messi Bouli	0	1	—	0	0	—	1
16	44	CB	(Spain)	Héctor Yuste	0	1	—	0	0	—	1
16	57	CB	(India)	Bathala Sunil	—					1	1
16	60	LB	(India)	Tonmoy Ghosh	—					1	1
16	63	CB	(India)	Monotosh Chakladar	0	—		0	—	1	1
16	64	CM	(India)	Naseeb Rahman	—					1	1
16	66	AM	(India)	Shyamal Besra	—					1	1
16	72	FW	(India)	Subrata Murmu	—					1	1
16	81	RM	(India)	Suman Dey	—					1	1
16	88	LB	(India)	Mark Zothanpuia	1	0	—	0	—		1
Total					4	19	0	1	6	41	71

=== Clean sheets ===
As of 12 March 2025

No.	Nat.	Player	Durand Cup	Indian Super League	Super Cup	AFC CL Two	AFC Challenge League	Calcutta League	Total
13	(India)	Prabhsukhan Singh Gill	0	6	—	0	1	—	7
24	(India)	Debjit Majumder	0	0	—	0	0	0	0
27	(India)	Aditya Patra	0	—		0	0	9	9
71	(India)	Sangramjit Roy Chowdhury	—					1	1

=== Disciplinary record ===
As of 12 March 2025

No.	Nat.	Name	Durand Cup				Indian Super League				Super Cup				AFC CL Two				AFC Challenge League				Calcutta League			
No.	Nat.	Name	Yellow card	(yellow card) (red card)	(yellow card) (yellow-red card)	Red card	Yellow card	(yellow card) (red card)	(yellow card) (yellow-red card)	Red card	Yellow card	(yellow card) (red card)	(yellow card) (yellow-red card)	Red card	Yellow card	(yellow card) (red card)	(yellow card) (yellow-red card)	Red card	Yellow card	(yellow card) (red card)	(yellow card) (yellow-red card)	Red card	Yellow card	(yellow card) (red card)	(yellow card) (yellow-red card)	Red card
3	(India)	Provat Lakra	0	0	0	0	4	0	1	0	—				0	0	0	0	0	0	0	0	—			
4	(India)	Anwar Ali	—				1	0	0	0	—				—				1	0	0	0	—			
5	(India)	Lalchungnunga	2	0	0	0	7	0	3	0	—				1	0	0	0	2	0	1	0	—			
6	(India)	Jeakson Singh Thounaojam	0	0	0	0	5	0	1	0	—				0	0	0	0	0	0	0	0	—			
7	(Venezuela)	Richard Celis	—				3	0	0	0	—				—				0	0	0	0	—			
8	(France)	Madih Talal	1	0	0	0	1	0	0	0	—				0	0	0	0	0	0	0	0	—			
9	(Brazil)	Dimitrios Diamantakos	0	0	0	0	2	0	0	1	—				0	0	0	0	0	0	0	0	—			
10	(Brazil)	Cleiton Silva	0	0	0	0	3	0	0	0	—				0	0	0	0	2	0	0	0	—			
11	(India)	Nandhakumar Sekar	0	0	0	0	5	0	0	1	—				0	0	0	0	0	0	0	0	—			
12	(India)	Mohammad Rakip	0	0	0	0	5	0	0	0	—				0	0	0	0	0	0	0	0	—			
13	(India)	Prabhsukhan Singh Gill	0	0	0	0	2	0	0	0	—				0	0	0	0	1	0	0	0	—			
14	(India)	David Lalhlansanga	1	0	0	0	1	0	0	0	—				0	0	0	0	0	0	0	0	1	0	0	0
19	(Jordan)	Hijazi Maher	0	0	0	0	3	0	0	0	—				1	0	0	0	1	0	0	0	—			
21	(Spain)	Saúl Crespo	1	0	0	0	4	0	0	0	—				1	0	0	0	0	0	0	0	—			
21	(India)	Nishu Kumar	0	0	0	0	1	0	0	0	—				0	0	0	0	0	0	0	0	—			
23	(India)	Souvik Chakrabarti	1	0	0	0	5	0	1	0	—				1	0	0	0	0	0	0	0	—			
24	(India)	Debjit Majumder	0	0	0	0	0	0	0	0	—				0	0	0	0	0	0	0	0	1	0	0	0
28	(Cameroon)	Messi Bouli	—				2	0	0	0	—				—				2	0	0	0	—			
29	(India)	Naorem Mahesh Singh	0	0	0	0	3	0	1	0	—				0	0	0	0	1	0	0	0	—			
44	(Spain)	Héctor Yuste	0	0	0	0	4	0	0	0	—				0	0	0	0	2	0	0	0	—			
53	(India)	Ananthu N. S.	—				—				—				—				—				2	0	0	0
58	(India)	Sanjib Ghosh	—				—				—				—				—				2	0	0	0
59	(India)	Jesin TK	0	0	0	0	0	0	0	0	—				—				0	0	0	0	3	0	0	0
61	(India)	Tanmay Das	0	0	0	0	1	0	1	0	—				—				0	0	0	0	0	0	0	0
62	(India)	Aman C. K.	0	0	0	0	1	0	0	0	—				0	0	0	0	—				4	0	0	0
64	(India)	Naseeb Rahman	—				—				—				—				0	0	0	0	1	0	0	0
79	(India)	Abinash Shagolsem	—				—				—				—				—				1	0	0	0
81	(India)	Suman Dey	—				1	0	0	0	—				—				—				1	0	0	0
82	(India)	P. V. Vishnu	0	0	0	0	3	0	0	0	—				0	0	0	0	0	0	0	0	0	0	0	0
84	(India)	Sayan Banerjee	0	0	0	0	1	0	0	0	—				—				0	0	0	0	1	0	0	0
85	(India)	Chaku Mandi	—				—				—				—				—				2	0	0	0
86	(India)	Muhammed Roshal PP	—				—				—				—				—				3	0	0	0
90	(India)	Joseph Justin	—				—				—				—				—				2	0	1	0

== See also ==
- 2024–25 in Indian football
