= Aman C. K. =

Indian footballer (born 2003)

Personal information
- Full name: Aman Chama Kuzhiyil
- Date of birth: 19 March 2003 (age 23)
- Place of birth: Kerala, India
- Height: 1.75 m (5 ft 9 in)
- Position: Winger

Team information
- Current team: NorthEast United

Youth career
- 2021–2022: Mumbai City B
- 2022–2023: East Bengal B

Senior career*
Years	Team	Apps	(Gls)
2021–2022	Mumbai City B	4	(0)
2022–2025	East Bengal B	13	(3)
2023–2026	East Bengal	9	(0)
2026	Gokulam Kerala	4	(0)
2026	Jamshedpur		(0)
2026–	NorthEast United	2	(1)
- * Club domestic league appearances and goals as of 5 November 2026

Aman Chama Kuzhiyil (born 19 March 2003) is an Indian professional footballer who plays as a forward for Indian Super League club NorthEast United.

== Club career ==
=== East Bengal ===
Aman joined East Bengal U-21 in 2023 after trials ahead of the Reliance Foundation Development League. Aman impressed and was part of the squad for the 2023 CFL Premier Division where Aman scored 5 goals in 10 matches in the Calcutta League and East Bengal finished runner-up. The impressive performance in the Calcutta League allowed Aman to get promoted into the Indian Super League squad and Aman made his professional debut on 9 December 2023 against Punjab at the Salt Lake Stadium when he came on as a substitute for Naorem Mahesh Singh in the ninety-second minute. Aman was also part of the 2024 Indian Super Cup campaign and made one appearance against Hyderabad on 9 January 2024, as East Bengal went onto become champions. Aman made his second Indian Super League appearance on 3 April 2024 against Kerala Blasters at Kochi when he came in as a substitute for P. V. Vishnu in the sixty-sixth minute and provided his first assist for Saúl Crespo as East Bengal won 4–2.

== Career statistics ==
=== Club ===
As of 27 September 2024

Club	Season	League			Cup		Others		AFC		Total	
Club	Season	Division	Apps	Goals	Apps	Goals	Apps	Goals	Apps	Goals	Apps	Goals
East Bengal	2023–24	Indian Super League	4	0	1 (Note: Appearances in the Super Cup.)	0	10 (Note: Appearances in the Calcutta Football League.)	5	–		15	5
East Bengal	2024–25	Indian Super League	3	0	2 (Note: Appearances in the Durand Cup.)	0	13	5	1 (Note: 1 Appearance in the AFC Champions League Two.)	0	19	5
East Bengal	East Bengal total		7	0	3	0	23	10	1	0	34	10
Career total			7	0	3	0	23	10	1	0	34	10

== Honours ==
East Bengal

- Super Cup: 2024
- Calcutta Football League runner-up: 2023
