= 2024–25 CFL Premier Division =

126th edition of CFL Premier Division

CFL Premier Division
- Season: 2024
- Dates: 25 June 2024 – 18 February 2025
- Champions: East Bengal (40th title)
- Relegated: Eastern Railway; Tollygunge Agragami
- Matches: 186
- Goals: 539 (2.9 per match)
- Top goalscorer: Jesin TK (13 goals)
- Biggest home win: Mohun Bagan SG 8–1 Railway; 25 August 2024
- Biggest away win: Army Red 0–6 Aryan; 27 June 2024
- Highest scoring: Mohun Bagan SG 8–1 Railway; 25 August 2024
- Longest winning run: East Bengal (10 matches)
- Longest unbeaten run: East Bengal (17 matches)
- Longest winless run: Police AC (11 matches)
- Highest attendance: 26,000; East Bengal vs Mohun Bagan SG (13 July 2024)

The 2024–25 CFL Premier Division was the 126th overall season of the Calcutta Football League – highest state-level football division of West Bengal. The 2024-25 edition had 26 teams divided into two groups of 12 in the first phase, with top 6 qualifying for the championship round and bottom 6 heading into the relegation round.

== Changes from last season ==
▼ Relegated to 2024 CFL First Division

- West Bengal Police FC
- Calcutta FC
- FCI
- Dalhousie AC

▲ Promoted to 2024–25 CFL Premier Division

- Suruchi Sangha
- Kalighat Sports Lovers Association
- Measurers Club
- Calcutta Police Club

== Format ==
The 2024-25 CFL Premier Division, like the 2023 CFL Premier Division, will have twenty-six teams divided into two groups in the first phase, where each team will play twelve matches in a round robin format. After that, the top three teams from the two groups shall proceed to the championship round, where each team shall play five more matches to determine the champion. The bottom three teams from both groups will play the relegation round.

== Rule changes ==
From 2024 to 25 season IFA introduced Son of Soil (ভূমিপুত্র) rule, where each team must field at least 4 West Bengal born footballers in the playing XI at all time.

== Venues ==
- Amal Datta Krirangan, Dum Dum
- Bankimanjali Stadium, Naihati
- Bibhutibhushan Bandyopadhyay Stadium, Barrackpore
- Bidhannagar Municipal Sports Complex
- East Bengal/Aryan Ground, Kolkata
- Eastern Ground, Chinsurah
- Kalyani Stadium, Kalyani
- Kishore Bharati Krirangan, Kolkata
- Mohammedan/Howrah Union Ground, Kolkata
- Mohun Bagan/Calcutta FC Ground, Kolkata
- Netaji Sports Complex, Kamalgazi
- Rabindra Sarobar Stadium, Kolkata
- Uluberia Stadium, Howrah
- Vivekananda Yuba Bharati Krirangan, Kolkata

== Teams ==
Locations of CFL teams

Group A			Group B		
Team	Head coach	Captain	Team	Head coach	Captain
Army Red	(India) Sudhir Mishra	(India) Renzong Lepcha	Bhawanipore	(Nigeria) Shahid Raman	(India) Jiten Murmu
Aryan	(India) Rajdeep Nandy	(India) Sandip Patra	Calcutta Customs	(India) Biswajit Bhattacharya	(India) Amit Chakraborty
BSS	(India) Souren Dutta	(India) Subhankar Das	Calcutta Police Club	(India) Bijoy Ghosh	(India) Koushik Goala
Diamond Harbour	(Spain) Kibu Vicuna	(India) Raju Gaikwad	East Bengal	(India) Bino George	(India) Aditya Patra
Kalighat MS	(India) Patham Thapa	(India) Koushik Sarkar	Eastern Railway	(India) Subhagato Roy	(India) Antoni Soren
Kidderpore	(India) Sayantan Das Roy	(India) Prosenjit Chakroborty	George Telegraph	(India) Goutam Ghosh	(India) Sourish Lodh Chowdhury
Measurers Club	(India) Rajib Dey	(India) Chattu Mondal	Kalighat Sports Lovers Association	(India) Jahar Das	(India) Bishal Chhetri
Mohammedan	(Ghana) Hakim Ssengendo	(India) Samad Ali Mallick	Mohun Bagan SG	(India) Deggie Cardozo	(India) Suhail Bhat
Pathachakra	(India) Lalkamal Bhowmick	(India) Subhajit Mandi	Peerless	(India) Hemanta Dora	(India) Donlad Diengdoh
Southern Samity	(India) Dipankar Biswas	(India) Rajesh Rajbhar	Police AC	(India) Rajesh Rajbhar	(India) Deep Dey
Suruchi Sangha	(India) Ranjan Bhattacharya	(India) Amit Tudu	Railway	(India) Amit Tudu	(India) Sudipta Banerjee
United	(Belgium) Steven Herbots	(India) Tarak Hembram	Rainbow	(India) Aditya Chatterjee	(India) Sourav Dasgupta
Wari	(India) Swapan Biswas	(India) Kamran Farooque	Tollygunge Agragami	(India) Arindam Deb	(India) Avinabo Bag

== First stage ==
=== Group A ===
Pos	Team	Pld	W	D	L	GF	GA	GD	Pts	Qualification
1	Diamond Harbour	12	10	2	0	32	7	+25	32	Qualified for the Super Six round
2	Suruchi Sangha	12	7	3	2	19	9	+10	24	Qualified for the Super Six round
3	Mohammedan	12	5	4	3	24	14	+10	19	Qualified for the Super Six round
4	Kidderpore	12	5	4	3	16	15	+1	19	
5	United SC	12	5	3	4	15	10	+5	18	
6	BSS	12	3	6	3	11	16	−5	15	
7	Southern Samity	12	4	2	6	16	15	+1	14	
8	Pathachakra	12	4	2	6	14	16	−2	14	
9	Aryan	12	3	3	6	15	15	0	12	
10	Measurers Club	12	3	3	6	14	23	−9	12	
11	Wari	12	3	3	6	15	29	−14	12	Relegation round
12	Kalighat MS	12	2	5	5	6	12	−6	11	Relegation round
13	Army Red	12	2	4	6	12	28	−16	10	Relegation round

Source: The Away End
Rules for classification: 1) points; 2) head-to-head points; 3) head-to-head goal difference; 4) goal difference; 5) number of goals scored; 6) drawing of lots

=== Group B ===
Pos	Team	Pld	W	D	L	GF	GA	GD	Pts	Qualification
1	East Bengal	12	11	1	0	35	4	+31	34	Qualified for the Super Six round
2	Bhawanipore	12	10	1	1	35	4	+31	31	Qualified for the Super Six round
3	Calcutta Customs	12	7	3	2	22	13	+9	24	Qualified for the Super Six round
4	Peerless	12	6	1	5	20	14	+6	19	
5	Kalighat SLA	12	6	1	5	21	17	+4	19	
6	Calcutta Police	12	5	3	4	13	12	+1	18	
7	Mohun Bagan SG	12	4	4	4	28	15	+13	16	
8	George Telegraph	12	5	0	7	12	20	−8	15	
9	ASOS Rainbow	12	2	7	3	15	17	−2	13	
10	Railway FC	12	3	1	8	11	29	−18	10	
11	Eastern Railway	12	2	2	8	5	28	−23	8	Relegation round
12	Police AC	12	1	4	7	8	25	−17	7	Relegation round
13	Tollygunge Agragami	12	1	2	9	13	40	−27	5	Relegation round

Source: The Away End
Rules for classification: 1) points; 2) head-to-head points; 3) head-to-head goal difference; 4) goal difference; 5) number of goals scored; 6) drawing of lots

== Super Six ==
The top three teams from both groups qualified for the Super Six round with the points from the group stage being carried over.

=== Qualified teams ===
The six qualified teams for the Super Six phase from both the groups:

Group A	Group B
Diamond Harbour	East Bengal
Suruchi Sangha	Bhawanipore
Mohammedan	Calcutta Customs

=== Standings ===
Pos	Team	Pld	W	D	L	GF	GA	GD	Pts	Qualification
1	East Bengal^{ISL} (C)	17	15	2	0	52	7	+45	47	Champions
2	Diamond Harbour^{IL2}	17	12	3	2	39	14	+25	39	
3	Bhawanipore	17	11	3	3	38	13	+25	36	
4	Calcutta Customs	17	8	5	4	32	25	+7	29	
5	Suruchi Sangha	17	8	4	5	23	22	+1	28	
6	Mohammedan^{ISL}	17	7	5	5	33	20	+13	26	

Source: The Away End
Rules for classification: 1) points; 2) goal difference; 3) number of goals scored; 4) head-to-head points; 5) head-to-head goal difference; 6) fair play ranking; 7) drawing of lots
(C) Champions

=== Fixtures ===
Team 1 \ Team 2	EAB	DHB	BHA	CCM	SUS	MDS
East Bengal	—	3–0 (Note: Walkover)	3–0 (Note: Walkover since Bhawanipore FC confirmed that they shall not field team.)	4–1	5–0	2–2
Diamond Harbour	—	—	1–1	4–0	2–0	0–3 (Note: Walkover)
Bhawanipore	—	—	—	2–2	4–1	0–2
Calcutta Customs	—	—	—	—	1–1	2–1
Suruchi Sangha	—	—	—	—	—	2–1
Mohammedan	—	—	—	—	—	—

Source: The Away End
Legend: Blue = left column team win; Yellow = draw; Red = top row team win.

12 September 2024 Super 6	Mohammedan	2–0	Bhawanipore	Barrackpore
15:00 IST	Lalngaihsaka 73'; Israfil 90+5'	Report		Stadium: Bibhutibhushan Bandyopadhyay Stadium

12 September 2024 Super 6	East Bengal	4–1	Calcutta Customs	Kolkata
15:00 IST	Shyamal 45'; Vishnu 45+2', 51'; Adil 73'	Report	Robi 25'	Stadium: East Bengal Ground

14 September 2024 Super 6	Suruchi Sangha	0–2	Diamond Harbour	Naihati
15:00 IST		Report	R. Paswan 19', 23'	Stadium: Bankimanjali Stadium

15 September 2024 Super 6	Mohammedan	1-2	Calcutta Customs	Naihati
15:00 IST	Suraj 71'	Report	Robi 30'; Ujjal 45'	Stadium: Bankimanjali Stadium; Referee: Dipak Singha

17 September 2024 Super 6	East Bengal	5–0	Suruchi Sangha	Kolkata
15:00 IST	Aman 9', 41'; Vishnu 17'; Jesin 26'; Roshal 73'	Report		Stadium: East Bengal Ground

18 September 2024 Super 6	Bhawanipore	1–1	Diamond Harbour	Barrackpore
15:00 IST	Naro Hari 68' (pen.)	Report	Jiten 72' (pen.)	Stadium: Bibhutibhushan Bandyopadhyay Stadium

20 September 2024 Super 6	Mohammedan	2–2	East Bengal	Naihati
15:00 IST	Bamiya 21'; Robinson 51'	Report	Jesin TK 40', 77'	Stadium: Bankimanjali Stadium; Attendance: 2.000; Referee: Dipu Roy

21 September 2024 Super 6	Suruchi Sangha	1–4	Bhawanipore	Barrackpore
15:00 IST	Jaideep 88'	Report	Jojo 29', 34'; Junain 48'; Sougata 71'	Stadium: Bibhutibhushan Bandyopadhyay Stadium

22 September 2024 Super 6	Diamond Harbour	4–0	Calcutta Customs	Naihati
15:00 IST	Rahul 45+3'; Jobby 90+1'; Girik 90+3'; Naro Hari 90+6'	Report		Stadium: Bankimanjali Stadium

24 September 2024 Super 6	Suruchi Sangha	2–1	Mohammedan	Barrackpore
15:00 IST	Abusufian 75'; Sanjoy 85'	Report	Lalngaihsaka 39'	Stadium: Bibhutibhushan Bandyopadhyay Stadium

26 September 2024 Super 6	Calcutta Customs	2–2	Bhawanipore	Barrackpore
15:00 IST		Report		Stadium: Bibhutibhushan Bandyopadhyay Stadium

30 September 2024 Super 6	Suruchi Sangha	1–1	Calcutta Customs	Uluberia
15:00 IST	Jaideep 20'	Report	Samrat 35'	Stadium: Uluberia Ground

– Super 6	East Bengal	3–0	Bhawanipore	Kolkata
15:00 IST				Stadium: East Bengal Ground

13 February 2025 Super 6	East Bengal	3–0	Diamond Harbour	Kolkata
14:00 IST		Report		Stadium: Kishore Bharati Krirangan

18 February 2025 Super 6	Diamond Harbour	0–3	Mohammedan	Naihati
14:00 IST				Stadium: Bankimanjali Stadium

== Relegation round ==
The bottom teams from both groups qualified for the Relegation round with the points from the group stage being carried over. The bottom 3 teams in the relegation round will be relegated to First Division.

=== Qualified teams ===
The six teams for the Relegation phase from both the groups are:

Group A	Group B
Wari	Eastern Railway
Kalighat MS	Police AC
Army Red	Tollygunge Agragami

=== Standings ===
Pos	Team	Pld	W	D	L	GF	GA	GD	Pts	Qualification
1	Army Red	17	6	5	6	20	29	−9	23	
2	Kalighat MS	17	4	7	6	15	16	−1	19	
3	Wari	17	5	3	9	25	38	−13	18	
4	Police AC	17	4	5	8	15	27	−12	17	
5	Eastern Railway (R)	17	4	2	11	13	39	−26	14	Relegated to First Division
6	Tollygunge Agragami (R)	17	1	2	14	13	54	−41	5	Relegated to First Division

Source: The Away End
Rules for classification: 1) points; 2) goal difference; 3) number of goals scored; 4) head-to-head points; 5) head-to-head goal difference; 6) fair play ranking; 7) drawing of lots
(R) Relegated

=== Fixtures ===
Team 1 \ Team 2	WAR	KMS	ARM	ERL	PAC	TAG
Wari	—	1–4	0–1	5–1	1–3	3–0 (Note: Walkover since Tollygunge Agragami FC withdrew their team from Relegation Round.)
Kalighat MS	—	—	0–0	2–3	0–0	3–0
Army Red	—	—	—	3–1	1–0	3–0
Eastern Railway	—	—	—	—	0–1	3–0
Police AC	—	—	—	—	—	3–0
Tollygunge Agragami	—	—	—	—	—	—

Source: The Away End
Legend: Blue = left column team win; Yellow = draw; Red = top row team win.

== Season statistics ==
=== Top scorers ===
As of September 3rd, 2024

Rank	Player	Team	Goals
1	(India) Jesin TK	East Bengal	13
2	(India) Jiten Murmu	Bhawanipore	8
2	(India) Jobby Justin	Diamond Harbour	8
4	(India) David Lalchhuanawma	Calcutta Customs	7
4	(India) Suhail Bhat	Mohun Bagan SG	7
6	(India) Jaideep Singh	Suruchi Sangha	6
6	(India) Rajon Barman	Rainbow	6
6	(India) Robi Hansda	Calcutta Customs	6
6	(India) Sujal Munda	United	6
10	(India) Israfil Dewan	Mohammedan Sporting	5
10	(India) Jojo Zaihmingthanga	Bhawanipore	5
10	(India) Ngairangbam Rakesh Singh	Kidderpore	5

== See also ==
- 2024–25 I-League 3
- 2024–25 Indian State Leagues
- 2024–25 in Indian football
