= 2023 CFL Premier Division =

125th edition of CFL Premier Division

CFL Premier Division
- Season: 2023
- Dates: 25 June – 30 November
- Champions: Mohammedan (14th title)
- Relegated: West Bengal Police FC; Calcutta FC; FCI; Dalhousie AC
- Matches: 196
- Goals: 579 (2.95 per match)
- Top goalscorer: David Lalhlansanga (21)
- Highest scoring: East Bengal 10–1 Kidderpore (26 September); George Telegraph 10-1 FCI (20 November)
- Longest unbeaten run: 12 matches (East Bengal)

The 2023 CFL Premier Division is the 125th overall season of the Calcutta Football League – highest state-level football divisions of West Bengal. The 2023 edition saw two top tiers merged, with 26 teams participating in the tournament for the first time since its inception.

== Format ==
The 2023 CFL Premier Division merged the top two tiers, Premier A and B, to form an expanded 26-team competition. Two groups of thirteen teams were divided, with each team playing every other in the group once. The top three teams proceeded to the Super Six round, where they vied for the championship with the points from group stage being carried over. Each group's bottom four teams enter the relegation round. As per the rules set by AIFF, this year, no foreign players will be participating in the league.

== Venues ==
- Amal Datta Krirangan, Dum Dum
- Aryan Town Club Ground, Durgapur
- Bankimanjali Stadium, Naihati
- Bidhannagar Municipal Sports Complex
- Canning Stadium, Canning
- East Bengal-Aryan Ground, Kolkata
- Eastern Ground, Chinsurah
- Kalyani Stadium, Kalyani
- Kishore Bharati Krirangan, Kolkata
- Mohammedan Sporting Ground, Kolkata
- Mohun Bagan-Calcutta FC Ground, Kolkata
- Netaji Sports Complex, Kamalgazi
- Rabindra Sarobar Stadium, Kolkata
- Rishi Aurobindo Maidan, Konnagar
- Royal Park Stadium, Barrackpore
- Sailen Manna Stadium, Howrah
- Salt Lake Stadium, Kolkata
- Vidyasagar Krirangan, Barasat
- Vivekananda Stadium, Khardah

== Teams ==
The 26 teams were divided into two groups based on a draw held on 5 June 2023.

Group A			Group B		
Team	Head coach	Captain	Team	Head coach	Captain
Army Red	(India) L Antony Ramesh	(India) Suresh Meitei	Aryan	(India) Rajdeep Nandy	(India) Laltu Mondal
Calcutta FC	(India) Jamshid Nassiri	(India) Surojit Das	Bhawanipore	(India) Ranjan Chaudhuri	(India) Jiten Murmu
Dalhousie AC	(India) Mridul Banerjee	(India) Karan Gomes	BSS	(India) Subrata Biswas	(India) Surajit Seal
Diamond Harbour FC	(Spain) Kibu Vicuna	(India) Abhishek Das	Calcutta Customs	(India) Biswajit Bhattacharya	(India) Amit Chakraborty
FCI (East Zone)	(India) Arun Saha	(India) Dhananjoy Adhikari	East Bengal	(India) Bino George	(India) Subhendu Mandi
Kalighat MS	(India) Patam Bahadur Thapa	(India) Madan Mandi	Eastern Railway	(India) Prasanta Chakraborty	(India) Sumit Orao
Mohammedan Sporting	(India) Mehrajuddin Wadoo	(India) Samad Ali Mallick	George Telegraph	(India) Goutam Ghosh	(India) Sourish Lodh Chowdhury
Mohun Bagan SG	(India) Bastab Roy	(India) Sumit Rathi	Kidderpore	(India) Sayantan Das Roy	(India) Gurmeet Singh
Pathachakra	(India) Rajarshi Ghosh	(India) Ankan Bhattacharjee	Police AC	(India) Supriya Dasgupta	(India) Suraj Bahadur Gurung
Peerless	(India) Hemanta Dora	(India) Amit Tudu	Railway	(India) Kaushik Paul	(India) Monish Majumder
Southern Samity	(India) Ranjan Bhattacharjee	(India) Debayan Hazra	Rainbow	(India) Aditya Chatterjee	(India) Debayan Saha
Tollygunge Agragami	(India) Arindam Deb	(India) Sujoy Mondal	Wari	(India) Micky Fernandes	(India) Swarup Sarkar
United	(Belgium) Steven Herbots	(India) Sanjib Mondal	West Bengal Police FC	(India) Ashok Chakraborty	(India) Subrata Biswas

== First stage ==
=== Group A ===
Pos	Team	Pld	W	D	L	GF	GA	GD	Pts	Qualification
1	Mohammedan SC	12	9	2	1	33	9	+24	29	Qualified for the Super Six round
2	Diamond Harbour FC	12	9	2	1	26	5	+21	29	Qualified for the Super Six round
3	Mohun Bagan SG	12	7	3	2	30	13	+17	24	Qualified for the Super Six round
4	Kalighat MS	12	7	3	2	21	8	+13	24	
5	Army Red	12	5	6	1	18	11	+7	21	
6	Peerless SC	12	5	5	2	22	9	+13	20	
7	United SC	12	6	1	5	25	8	+17	19	
8	Southern Samity	12	4	3	5	14	17	−3	15	
9	Tollygunge Agragami FC	12	2	2	8	9	28	−19	8	
10	Pathachakra	12	1	4	7	13	28	−15	7	Relegation round
11	Calcutta FC	12	1	4	7	8	38	−30	7	Relegation round
12	FCI (East Zone)	12	1	3	8	8	32	−24	6	Relegation round
13	Dalhousie AC	12	0	4	8	8	29	−21	4	Relegation round

Source: The Away End
Rules for classification: 1) points; 2) head-to-head points; 3) head-to-head goal difference; 4) goal difference; 5) number of goals scored; 6) drawing of lots

=== Group B ===
Pos	Team	Pld	W	D	L	GF	GA	GD	Pts	Qualification
1	East Bengal	12	9	3	0	29	6	+23	30	Qualified for the Super Six round
2	Bhawanipore	12	8	3	1	23	8	+15	27	Qualified for the Super Six round
3	Kidderpore	12	8	1	3	16	11	+5	25	Qualified for the Super Six round
4	Aryan	12	8	0	4	28	12	+16	24	
5	Calcutta Customs	12	6	1	5	13	13	0	19	
6	ASOS Rainbow	12	5	2	5	11	10	+1	17	
7	Wari	12	5	1	6	16	23	−7	16	
8	Railway FC	12	3	3	6	12	21	−9	12	
9	BSS	12	2	5	5	12	14	−2	11	
10	George Telegraph	12	3	2	7	11	19	−8	11	Relegation round
11	Eastern Railway	12	3	2	7	16	26	−10	11	Relegation round
12	Police AC	12	3	1	8	10	22	−12	10	Relegation round
13	West Bengal Police	12	2	2	8	12	24	−12	8	Relegation round

Source: The Away End
Rules for classification: 1) points; 2) head-to-head points; 3) head-to-head goal difference; 4) goal difference; 5) number of goals scored; 6) drawing of lots

== Super Six ==
The top three teams from both groups qualified for the Super Six round with the points from group stage being carried over.

=== Standings ===
Pos	Team	Pld	W	D	L	GF	GA	GD	Pts	Qualification
1	Mohammedan (C)	17	14	2	1	44	11	+33	44	Champions
2	East Bengal	17	13	3	1	50	10	+40	42	
3	Diamond Harbour (Q)	16	10	3	3	32	12	+20	33	Eligible for 2024–25 I-League 3 (Note: If the top teams are already playing in national leagues, then the next highest ranked team(s) would be eligible for I-League 3.)
4	Bhawanipore	16	8	4	4	26	18	+8	28	Eligible for 2024–25 I-League 3
5	Mohun Bagan SG	15	8	3	4	33	18	+15	25 (Note: Mohun Bagan Super Giant was deducted 2 points for not fielding a team against East Bengal on 30 November 2023.)	
6	Kidderpore	15	8	1	6	17	29	−12	25	

Source: The Away End
Rules for classification: 1) points; 2) goal difference; 3) number of goals scored; 4) head-to-head points; 5) head-to-head goal difference; 6) fair play ranking; 7) drawing of lots
(C) Champions; (Q) Qualified for the phase indicated

=== Fixtures ===
Team 1 \ Team 2	BHA	DHB	EAB	KID	MOH	MBG
Bhawanipore	—	2–2	0–3*	DNP	1–2	0–3*
Diamond Harbour		—	1–4	3–0	0–2	DNP
East Bengal			—	10–1	1–2	3–0*
Kidderpore				—	0–5	DNP
Mohammedan					—	2–0
Mohun Bagan SG						—

Source: The Away End
Legend: Blue = left column team win; Yellow = draw; Red = top row team win.
- * = Walkover

== Relegation Round ==
=== Points table ===
Pos	Team	Pld	W	D	L	GF	GA	GD	Pts	Qualification
1	Pathachakra	19	6	5	8	30	36	−6	23	
2	George Telegraph	19	6	4	9	32	27	+5	22	
3	Police A.C.	19	6	4	9	22	33	−11	22	
4	Eastern Railway	19	5	5	9	23	33	−10	20	
5	Dalhousie AC	19	3	7	9	17	36	−19	16	Relegated to the First Division
6	FCI	19	3	4	12	16	52	−36	13	Relegated to the First Division
7	WB Police	19	3	3	13	18	39	−21	12	Relegated to the First Division
8	Calcutta FC	19	1	8	10	16	50	−34	11	Relegated to the First Division

Source: The Away End
Rules for classification: 1) points; 2) goal difference; 3) number of goals scored; 4) head-to-head points; 5) head-to-head goal difference; 6) fair play ranking; 7) drawing of lots

=== Fixtures ===
Team 1 \ Team 2	CFC	DAL	EAR	FCI	GET	PTC	PAC	WBP
Calcutta FC	—	1–2	2–2	0–1	2–2	2–4	1–1	0–0
Dalhousie AC		—	2–3	1–0	1–1	0–0	2–2	1–0
Eastern Railway			—	0–0	0–1	2–0	0–0	0–2
FCI				—	1–10	2–4	1–3	3–2
George Telegraph					—	2–3	0–1	5–0
Pathachakra						—	5–0	1–0
Police A.C.							—	5–2
WB Police								—

Source: The Away End
Legend: Blue = left column team win; Yellow = draw; Red = top row team win.
- * = Walkover

== Season statistics ==
=== Top scorers ===
As of 30 December 2023

Rank	Player	Club	Goals
1	(India) David Lalhlansanga	Mohammedan SC	21
2	(India) Rahul Paswan	Diamond Harbour FC	12
2	(India) Sahil Harijan	Pathachakra	12
4	(India) Sagar Kumar Khamaru	Eastern Railway	9
5	(India) Suhail Ahmad Bhat	Mohun Bagan SG	8
5	(India) Jiten Murmu	Bhawanipore	8
7	(India) Muhammed Ashiq Shoukathali	Kidderpore	7
8	(India) Anubrata Maity	Pathachakra	6
8	(India) Dipesh Murmu	United	6
8	(India) Mandeep Singh Multani	Wari	6
8	(India) Liton Shil	Army Red	6
8	(India) Aman C. K.	East Bengal FC	6
8	(India) Jesin TK	East Bengal FC	6
8	(India) Achinta Ghosh	Aryan FC	6
8	(India) Vishnu P.V.	East Bengal FC	6

=== Hat-tricks ===
Note: In the result, the score of the player's team is mentioned before.

Player	For	Against	Result	Date
(India) Saikat Sarkar	Aryan	Police AC	4–1	1 July 2023
(India) David Lalhlansanga	Mohammedan SC	Calcutta FC	7–0	12 July 2023
(India) Beneston Piecton Barretto	Mohammedan SC	Calcutta FC	7–0	12 July 2023
(India) Lalrinliana Hnamte	Mohun Bagan SG	Tollygunge Agragami	5–1	12 July 2023
(India) Suhail Ahmad Bhat	Mohun Bagan SG	Dalhousie	5–2	16 July 2023
(India) Dipesh Murmu	United	Calcutta FC	8–0	25 July 2023
(India) Liton Shil	Army Red	Southern Samity	3–2	25 July 2023
(India) Md Amirul	Aryan	Kidderpore SC	4–0	26 July 2023
(India) Jesin TK	East Bengal	George Telegraph SC	4–0	7 September 2023
(India) Vishnu PV	East Bengal	Kidderpore SC	10–1	26 September 2023
(India) Mahitosh Roy	East Bengal	Kidderpore SC	10–1	26 September 2023
