= Vishnu P. V. =

Indian footballer (born 2001)

Personal information
- Full name: Vishnu Puthiya Valappill
- Date of birth: 24 December 2001 (age 24)
- Place of birth: Kasaragod, Kerala, India
- Height: 1.78 m (5 ft 10 in)
- Positions: Right winger; left winger

Team information
- Current team: East Bengal
- Number: 7

Youth career
- –2021: Gokulam Kerala B
- 2021–2023: Luca SC
- 2023: Muthoot FA

Senior career*
Years	Team	Apps	(Gls)
2023–	East Bengal	49	(6)

International career^{‡}
2024	India U23	2	(0)
- * Club domestic league appearances and goals as of 14:15, 16 April 2026 (UTC) ‡ National team caps and goals as of 11:22, 16 April 2026 (UTC)

Vishnu Puthiya Valappill (born 24 December 2001) is an Indian professional footballer who plays as a forward for Indian Super League club East Bengal.

== Club career ==
=== East Bengal ===
Vishnu signed for East Bengal in 2023 on a three-year contract and debuted in the 2023 CFL Premier Division against Railway FC on 9 August 2023. He scored his first goal for East Bengal against Police AC on 14 August in a 2–1 victory. Vishnu again scored against George Telegraph on 7 September in a 4–0 win and then Vishnu scored four goals in a single match against Kidderpore as East Bengal won 10–1 equalling the most goals ever scored in a Calcutta League match by the club. Vishnu was thus promoted and registered for the Indian Super League squad and on 4 October 2023, Vishnu made his senior league debut for East Bengal against Bengaluru in a 2–1 defeat at the Sree Kanteerava Stadium when he came on as a substitute for Naorem Mahesh Singh in the 88th minute of the match. Vishnu was also part of the 2024 Indian Super Cup winning squad, having played all five matches in the tournament as East Bengal became champions defeating Odisha in the final at the Kalinga Stadium. On 29 February, Vishnu scored his first ever goal in the Indian Super League when he scored the fifth fastest goal ever in the tournament within 32 seconds against Odisha in a 2–1 defeat at the Kalinga Stadium.

== International career ==
Vishnu was selected in the India U23 squad for the friendlies against Malaysia U23 in March 2024.

== Career statistics ==
=== Club ===
As of 7 August 2026

Club	Season	League			Cup		Others		AFC		Total	
Club	Season	Division	Apps	Goals	Apps	Goals	Apps	Goals	Apps	Goals	Apps	Goals
East Bengal	2023–24	Indian Super League	19	1	5 (Note: Appearances in the Super Cup.)	0	7 (Note: Appearances in the Calcutta Football League.)	6	–		31	7
East Bengal	2024–25	Indian Super League	22	4	4 (Note: Three appearances in the Durand Cup and One appearance(s) in the Super Cup.)	0	9	5	5 (Note: One appearance in the AFC Champions League Two and Four appearances in the AFC Challenge League.)	0	40	9
East Bengal	2025–26	Indian Super League	13	1	11 (Note: Four appearances in the Durand Cup; Three appearances in the IFA Shield and Four appearances in the Super Cup.)	1	6	3	–		30	5
East Bengal	2026–27	Indian Super League	0	0	3 (Note: Three appearances in the Durand Cup.)	3	2	3	0	0	5	6
East Bengal	East Bengal total		54	6	23	4	24	17	5	0	106	27
Career total			54	6	23	4	24	17	5	0	106	27

== Honours ==
East Bengal

- ISL Cup: 2025-26
- Super Cup: 2024; runner-up: 2025–26
- CFL: 2024, 2025
- IFA Shield runner-up: 2025

India

- SAFF Championship: 2026
