= Mohammad Rakip =

Indian footballer (born 2000)

Personal information
- Full name: Mohammad Rakip
- Date of birth: 14 May 2000 (age 26)
- Place of birth: Imphal, Manipur, India
- Height: 1.73 m (5 ft 8 in)
- Position: Right back

Team information
- Current team: East Bengal
- Number: 12

Youth career
- AIFF Elite Academy

Senior career*
Years	Team	Apps	(Gls)
2017–2018	Kerala Blasters B	6	(0)
2018–2020	Kerala Blasters	26	(0)
2020–2022	Mumbai City	13	(0)
2022–	East Bengal	74	(0)

International career^{‡}
2015–2017	India U17	18	(0)
2017–2019	India U19	4	(0)
- * Club domestic league appearances and goals as of 16:03, 27 May 2024 (UTC) ‡ National team caps and goals as of 29 November 2017

Mohammad Rakip (born 14 May 2000) is an Indian professional footballer who plays as a defender for Indian Super League club East Bengal. He also represented India at the FIFA U-17 World Cup in 2017.

== Club career ==
=== Early career ===
Rakip is a product of AIFF Elite Academy. In 2016 he was selected to play for the Indian Arrows, a team consisting of Indian under 17 players. Rakip was shortlisted in the probable list for the 2017 FIFA Under 17 World Cup, but didn't make it to the final squad.

=== Kerala Blasters ===
In 2017, Rakip became the first Indian U17 player to sign for an Indian Super League. He was first put into the reserve team of the Blasters and played in 8 games for the club with I-League 2nd Division. After an impressive performance there, he was promoted into the senior side in 2018. He made his debut for the club against ATK on 29 October 2019, which ended 2–1 in favour for the Blasters. He totally made 11 appearances for the club during that season. After making 15 appearances for the blasters during the 2019–20 Indian Super League season, it was rumoured that Rakip did not want to sign a contract extension with the Blasters as he had offers from other ISL sides.

=== Mumbai City FC ===
On 20 October 2020, Mumbai City FC announced that they have signed Rakip on a two-year deal. He made his debut for the club on 25 November 2020 against FC Goa. In March 2022, he was included in club's 2022 AFC Champions League squad.

== Career statistics ==
=== Club ===
As of 31 October 2024

Club	Season	League			Cup		Other		AFC		Total	
Club	Season	Division	Apps	Goals	Apps	Goals	Apps	Goals	Apps	Goals	Apps	Goals
Kerala Blasters B	2017–18	I-League 2nd Division	6	0	0	0	—		—		6	0
Kerala Blasters	2018–19	Indian Super League	11	0	1 (Note: Appearance(s) in Super Cup)	0	—		—		12	0
Kerala Blasters	2019–20	Indian Super League	15	0	0	0	—		—		15	0
Kerala Blasters	Kerala Blasters total		26	0	1	0	0	0	0	0	27	0
Mumbai City	2020–21	Indian Super League	9	0	0	0	—		—		9	0
Mumbai City	2021–22	Indian Super League	4	0	0	0	—		2 (Note: Appearance(s) in AFC Champions League)	0	6	0
Mumbai City	Mumbai City total		13	0	0	0	0	0	2	0	15	0
East Bengal	2022–23	Indian Super League	6	0	4 (Note: Three appearance(s) in Durand Cup and One appearance in the Super Cup.)	0	2 (Note: Appearance(s) in Calcutta Football League)	0	—		12	0
East Bengal	2023–24	Indian Super League	19	0	9 (Note: Four appearance(s) in Durand Cup and Five appearances in the Super Cup.)	0	8	0	—		36	0
East Bengal	2024–25	Indian Super League	15	0	3 (Note: Two appearances in Durand Cup and One appearance(s) in the Super Cup.)	0	0	0	4 (Note: One appearance in AFC Champions League Two and Three appearances in AFC Challenge League.)	0	22	0
East Bengal	2025–26	Indian Super League	0	0	11 (Note: Five appearance(s) in Durand Cup, Three appearances in the IFA Shield and Three appearances in the Super Cup.)	0	0	0	—		11	0
East Bengal	East Bengal total		40	0	27	0	10	0	4	0	81	0
Career total			85	0	28	0	10	0	6	0	129	0

== Honours ==
East Bengal FC

- Indian Super League: 2025-26
- Super Cup: 2024
- Durand Cup runner-up: 2023

== External sources ==
- Mohammad Rakip at Soccerway
- Mohammad Rakip at Global Sports Archive
