= Jesin TK =

Indian footballer

Personal information
- Full name: Jesin Thonikkara
- Place of birth: Kerala, India
- Height: 1.85 m (6 ft 1 in)
- Position: Striker

Team information
- Current team: East Bengal
- Number: 59

Senior career*
Years	Team	Apps	(Gls)
2021–2022	Kerala United		
2022–	East Bengal	47	(29)
- * Club domestic league appearances and goals as of 22 January 2023

Jesin Thonikkara is an Indian professional footballer from Malappuram, Kerala who plays for East Bengal. He has represented Kerala State Football Team in Santosh Trophy. He scored five goals in Semi-final of Santosh Trophy 2021–22 against Karnataka to gain acclaim and attention. He played for Kerala United in Kerala Premier League before joining East Bengal.

== Career statistics ==
=== Club ===
As of 22 September 2025

Club	Season	League			Cup		Others		AFC		Total	
Club	Season	Division	Apps	Goals	Apps	Goals	Apps	Goals	Apps	Goals	Apps	Goals
East Bengal II	2022–23	I-League 2	4	1	–						4	1
East Bengal	2022–23	Indian Super League	0	0	0	0	4 (Note: Appearances in the Calcutta Football League.)	1	–		4	1
East Bengal	2023–24	Indian Super League	2	0	1 (Note: Appearances in the Super Cup.)	0	10	6	–		13	6
East Bengal	2024–25	Indian Super League	4	0	2 (Note: Appearances in the Durand Cup.)	1	14	13	0	0	18	14
East Bengal	2025–26	Indian Super League	0	0	0	0	7	5	0	0	7	5
East Bengal	East Bengal total		6	0	3	1	35	25	0	0	44	26
Career total			10	1	3	1	35	25	0	0	44	26

== Honours ==
East Bengal

- Super Cup: 2024
- Calcutta Football League: 2024, 2025

Individual

- Calcutta Football League Golden boot: 2024
