= Mark Zothanpuia =

Indian footballer (born 2003)

Personal information
- Date of birth: 22 April 2002 (age 24)
- Place of birth: Serchhip, Mizoram, India
- Height: 1.75 m (5 ft 9 in)
- Positions: Left-back; midfielder

Team information
- Current team: NorthEast United

Youth career
- 2017–2019: Pune City B

Senior career*
Years	Team	Apps	(Gls)
2019–2023	Hyderabad B	16	(0)
2020–2024	Hyderabad	23	(0)
2024–2026	East Bengal	7	(0)
2025–2026	→ Jamshedpur (loan)	10	(0)
2026–	NorthEast United	2	(0)

International career^{‡}
2024	India U23	2	(0)
- * Club domestic league appearances and goals as of 30 October 2026 ‡ National team caps and goals as of 07:55, 25 March 2024 (UTC)

Mark Zothanpuia (born 22 April 2002) is an Indian professional footballer who plays as a defender or midfielder for Indian Super League club NorthEast United.

== Club career ==
=== Hyderabad ===
Mark made his professional debut for Hyderabad in the Indian Super League in the 2020–21 season. He was part of the 2021–22 Indian Super League championship Hyderabad team.

== Career statistics ==
=== Club ===
As of 8 March 2025

Club	Season	League			National Cup		League Cup		AFC		Total	
Club	Season	Division	Apps	Goals	Apps	Goals	Apps	Goals	Apps	Goals	Apps	Goals
Hyderabad B	2019–20	I-League 2nd Division	5	0	–		–		–		5	0
Hyderabad B	2022	RFDL	7	0	–		–		–		7	0
Hyderabad B	2022–23	I-League 2nd Division	4	0	–		–		–		4	0
Hyderabad B	Total		16	0	0	0	0	0	0	0	16	0
Hyderabad	2021–22	Indian Super League	3	0	–		3 (Note: Appearance(s) in Durand Cup)	0	–		6	0
Hyderabad	2022–23	Indian Super League	2	0	2 (Note: Appearance(s) in Super Cup)	0	2	0	–		6	0
Hyderabad	2023–24	Indian Super League	18	0	3	0	3	0	–		24	0
Hyderabad	Total		23	0	5	0	8	0	0	0	36	0
East Bengal	2024–25	Indian Super League	7	0	–		3	0	1 (Note: Appearance(s) in AFC Champions League Two)	0	11	0
Jamshedpur	2025–26	Indian Super League	0	0	–		–		–		0	0
Career total			46	0	5	0	11	0	1	0	63	0

== Honours ==
Hyderabad

- Indian Super League: 2022–23
