= Richard Celis =

Venezuelan footballer (born 1996)

Personal information
- Full name: Richard Enrique Celis Sánchez
- Date of birth: 23 April 1996 (age 30)
- Place of birth: Maracaibo, Venezuela
- Height: 1.78 m (5 ft 10 in)
- Position: Forward

Team information
- Current team: Zamora

Senior career*
Years	Team	Apps	(Gls)
2013–2014	Atlético Venezuela	2	(0)
2016–2018	Deportivo JBL	47	(6)
2018	→ Senica (loan)	14	(0)
2019–2023	Caracas	118	(36)
2022	Millonarios (on loan)	19	(1)
2024–2025	Academia Puerto Cabello	25	(4)
2025	East Bengal	6	(0)
2025	Tecnico Universitario	5	(0)
2026-	Zamora	4	(1)

International career
2021–	Venezuela	4	(0)
- * Club domestic league appearances and goals as of 13:07, 9 February 2025 (UTC)

Richard Enrique Celis Sánchez (born 23 April 1996) is a Venezuelan professional footballer as a forward for Zamora.

== International career ==
He made his debut for Venezuela national football team on 8 June 2021 in a World Cup qualifier against Uruguay. He substituted Jefferson Savarino in the 83rd minute.

He was also selected for Venezuela's 2021 Copa América squad and appeared in their opening 0–3 loss to Brazil.
