= Hijazi Maher =

Jordanian footballer (born 1997)

Personal information
- Full name: Hijazi Maher Saleh Abu Saeed
- Date of birth: 20 September 1997 (age 29)
- Place of birth: Amman, Jordan
- Height: 1.88 m (6 ft 2 in)
- Position: Centre-back

Senior career*
Years	Team	Apps	(Gls)
2016–2017	Al-Ahli	28	(0)
2017–2022	Shabab Al-Ordon	116	(12)
2022–2023	Al-Hussein	29	(5)
2023	→ Zakho (loan)	12	(1)
2023–2025	East Bengal	30	(2)
2025–2026	Al-Faisaly	9	(0)

International career^{‡}
2023–	Jordan	9	(0)
- * Club domestic league appearances and goals as of 8 May 2026 ‡ National team caps and goals as of 3 October 2024

Hijazi Maher Saleh Abu Saeed (Arabic: حِجَازِيّ مَاهِر صَالِح أَبُو سَعِيد; born 20 September 1997) is a Jordanian professional footballer who plays as a centre-back. He most recently played for Jordanian Pro League club Al-Faisaly. He can also operate as left-back.

== Club career ==
=== East Bengal ===
Hijazi Maher joined Indian Super League side East Bengal on a free transfer on 28 September 2023. He was part of the team that lifted 2024 Indian Super Cup title, defeating defending champions Odisha 3–2.

=== Al-Faisaly ===
On 17 July 2025, Al-Faisaly announced the signing of Hijazi Maher to a three-year contract.

== Honours ==
East Bengal

- Super Cup: 2024
