= Killing of Amit Chakraborty =

2014 killing in Dubrajpur, West Bengal, India

Amit Chakraborty, a sub-inspector of Dubrajpur, West Bengal, was injured by bomb splinters during a clash between supporters of the Communist Party of India (Marxist) and Trinamool Congress at Aoulia-Gopalpur village in 2014. He succumbed to injuries after 50 days.

In 2018, all 18 accused were acquitted in Suri court. The judge accused the West Bengal Police for carrying out a lax and incompetent investigation, due to which the accused were acquitted due to lack of evidence. The widow of Amit Chakraborty accused political pressure on the police, for not investigating the case properly.

In 2014, he was injured in the stomach, when he and three other police officers were allegedly attacked by TMC men with a bomb. Bengal police denied the accusation of not taking action. After the acquittal of 18 accused, CID West Bengal took over the investigation. In 2016, Birbhum public prosecutor, on behalf of the West Bengal government, appealed on the court to free all accused before judgment. After protests from police, the victim's family, and opposition, the West Bengal government withdrew the appeal. Most of the accused were Trinamool Congress leaders and supporters.

Government of West Bengal was criticized for the appeal to withdraw all cases and free all accused; a majority of them were TMC members. The police made the deceased police officer Amit Chakraborty as the main witness in his own murder case. Police accepted their mistake on the court.
