= Hemanta Dora =

Indian football manager and former footballer

Personal information
- Full name: Hemanta Dora
- Date of birth: 4 December 1973 (age 52)
- Place of birth: Baidyabati, West Bengal , India
- Position: Goalkeeper

Senior career*
Years	Team	Apps	(Gls)
- East Bengal
- Mohun Bagan

International career
- India

Managerial career
- 2023–: Peerless
- * Club domestic league appearances and goals

Hemanta Dora (born 4 December 1973) is an Indian football manager and former international football player who played as a goalkeeper. He is the current Head coach of the Calcutta Premier Division side Peerless. Dora has played for Mohun Bagan and won the 1997-98 National Football League. He played for India national team including the Nehru Cup in 1997, and the 1998 Bangkok Asian Games.

== Honours ==
India

- SAFF Championship: 1993
- South Asian Games Gold medal: 1995

East Bengal

- Federation Cup: 1996

Mohun Bagan

- National Football League: 1997–98
