= Kidderpore SC =

Association football club in West Bengal, India

Kidderpore
- Full name: Kidderpore Sporting Club
- Founded: 1917; 109 years ago
- Ground: Braun Field Square
- Owner: Akash Das
- Head coach: Sayantan Das Roy
- League: CFL Premier Division
Home colours	Away colours

Kidderpore Sporting Club (Bengali: খিদিরপুর স্পোর্টিং ক্লাব) is an Indian professional multi-sports club based in Kidderpore in South Kolkata, West Bengal. Its association football team competes in the Calcutta Football League Premier Division A, alongside taking part in IFA Shield. They also have a futsal section.

== History ==
Initially incorporated in 1917, the club was founded by a Britisher Napier McDonald and assumed the current name after Indian independence in 1947. The club used to play its matches at the premises of the Bhukailash Rajbari in Kidderpore, before shifting its current base to the Kolkata Maidan. The club came into limelight during the coaching days of Achyut Banerjee, who managed Kidderpore in the 1950s–60s. They took part in numerous editions of IFA Shield; at the 1985 tournament, they faced Uruguayan champions Peñarol.

Notable players who have played or have started their careers at the club include Sheoo Mewalal, Mangal Purakayastha, Dipu Das, Gautam Sarkar, Surajit Sengupta, Prasun Banerjee, Amit Bagchi, and Arun Kumar Ghosh. In May 2022, the club roped in Managya Nakarmi from Nepal, their first ever Asian footballer. In June 2023, Indian Football Association (IFA) made an announcement that the merger of both Premier Division A and B of the Calcutta Football League have done ahead of its 125th edition, in which Kidderpore allowed to compete in Group II. In September, the club qualified for CFL "Super Six" round.

== Honours ==
- Bordoloi Trophy
  - Champions (1): 1987
  - Runners-up (1): 1970
- Independence Day Cup
  - Runners-up (1): 2004

== Other departments ==
=== Men's cricket ===
Kidderpore SC also operates men's team, which is affiliated to the Cricket Association of Bengal (CAB), and competes in domestic tournaments including CAB First Division League and P. Sen Memorial Trophy.

=== Men's futsal ===
Kidderpore runs futsal section and men's team competes in the IFA Futsal Club Championship.

== See also ==
- Football in Kolkata
- List of football clubs in West Bengal
