= 2024 AIFF Super Cup =

2024 Super Cup
Kalinga Super Cup
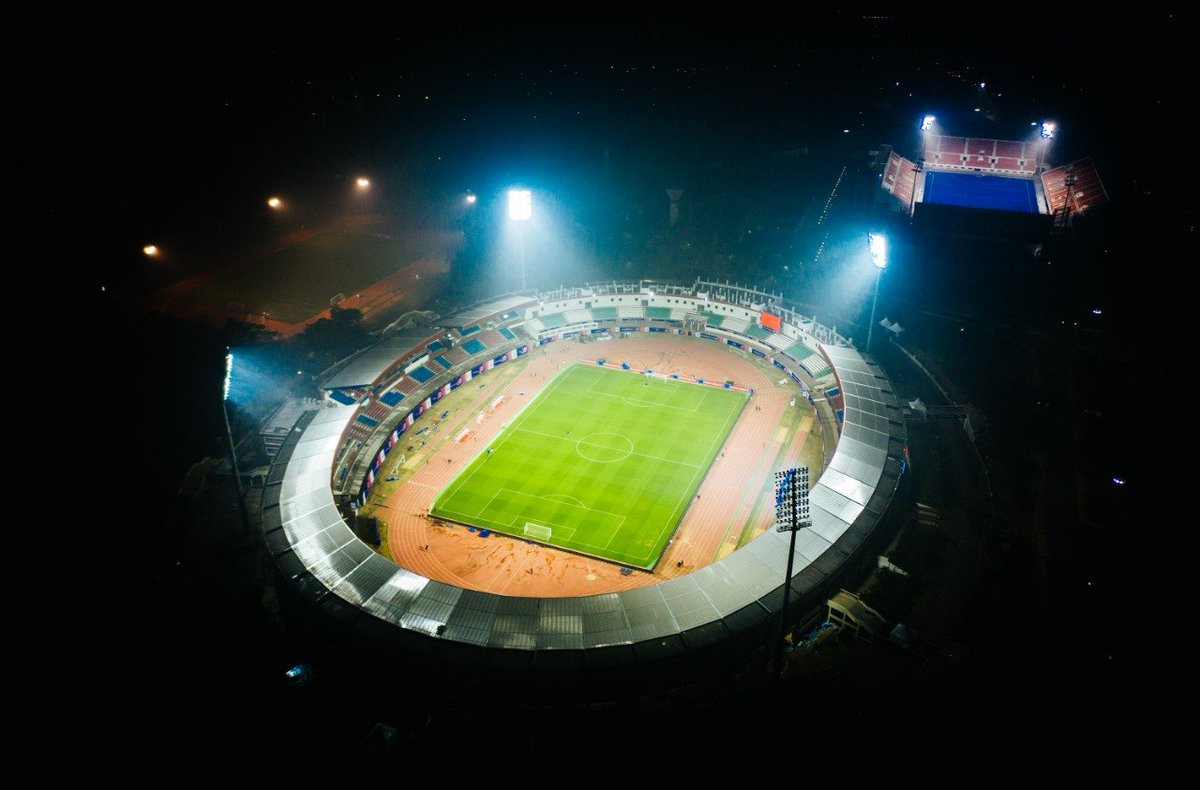
- Kalinga Stadium hosted the final on 28 January

Tournament details
- Country: India
- Venue(s): Kalinga Stadium (main pitch, pitch 1), Bhubaneswar
- Dates: Qualifying: 8 January; Competition proper: 9 – 28 January
- Teams: Competition proper: 16; Total (maximum): 17

Final positions
- Champions: East Bengal (1st title)
- Runners-up: Odisha
- AFC Champions League Two: East Bengal

Tournament statistics
- Matches played: 28
- Goals scored: 86 (3.07 per match)
- Top goal scorer: Cleiton Silva (5 goals)

Awards
- Best player: Isak Vanlalruatfela

The 2024 AIFF Super Cup, officially known as the 2024 Kalinga Super Cup for sponsorship reasons, was the fourth edition of the Super Cup and the 42nd season of the national knockout football competition in India.

Odisha were the defending champions, having defeated Bengaluru in the 2023 final.

East Bengal defeated the defending champions Odisha 3–2 in the final to win their first national title in 12 years. As the winners, East Bengal have qualified for the 2024–25 AFC Champions League Two preliminary stage.

== Format ==
Competition format consists of a Qualifying round, Group stage and a knock-out stage. Group stage featured 16 teams across the top two divisions of Indian football. All 12 from the ISL qualify directly for the group stage. Among the I-League teams confirming their participation (Gokulam Kerala FC, Sreenidi Deccan FC, Shillong Lajong FC, Inter Kashi, and Rajasthan United FC), the top three per 2023–24 standings on 24 December qualify for the group stage. The remaining two teams contested a single-leg qualifying play-off to determine the fourth and final I-League team in the group stage.

The 16 qualified teams were drawn into four groups of four each, competing in a single round-robin format, with group winners making it through to the semi-finals.

== Teams ==
Locations of the Super Cup teams

Group stage direct entrants:
Team	League	App (last)
Bengaluru	Indian Super League	4th (2023)
Chennaiyin	Indian Super League	4th (2023)
East Bengal	Indian Super League	3rd (2023)
Goa	Indian Super League	4th (2023)
Hyderabad	Indian Super League	2nd (2023)
Jamshedpur	Indian Super League	4th (2023)
Kerala Blasters	Indian Super League	4th (2023)
Mohun Bagan SG	Indian Super League	3rd (2023)
Mumbai City	Indian Super League	4th (2023)
NorthEast United	Indian Super League	4th (2023)
Odisha	Indian Super League	2nd (2023)
Punjab	Indian Super League	2nd (Note: Previously played in 2023 as Roundglass Punjab) (2023)
Gokulam Kerala	I-League	3rd (2023)
Shillong Lajong	I-League	2nd (2018)
Sreenidi Deccan	I-League	2nd (2023)

Qualification entrants:
Team	League	App (last)
Inter Kashi	I-League	1st
Rajasthan United	I-League	2nd (2023)

== Schedule ==
Phase	Round	Match dates
Qualification round	Qualifier	8 January 2024
Main tournament	Group stage	9–22 January 2024
Main tournament	Semi-finals	24–25 January 2024
Main tournament	Final	28 January 2024

== Venues ==
The matches were held in two different Kalinga Stadium pitches in Odisha.

Bhubaneswar
Kalinga Stadium
Main Pitch (Note: Center)	Pitch 1 (Note: Top left)
Capacity: 15,000	Capacity: ~1000 (Note: It is a practice pitch with temporary stands)

== Qualification round ==
Team 1	Score	Team 2
Inter Kashi	5–0	Rajasthan United

8 January 2024	Inter Kashi	5–0	Rajasthan United	Bhubaneswar
14:00 IST	Barco 10', 75'; Lalrindika 58'; Haobam 87'; Ajsal 88'	Report		Stadium: Kalinga Stadium Pitch 1 Attendance: 250; Referee: Pranjal Banerjee; Man of the Match: Mario Barco

== Group stage ==
=== Group A ===
Pos	Team	Pld	W	D	L	GF	GA	GD	Pts	Qualification	EAB	MBG	SRD	HYD
1	East Bengal	3	3	0	0	8	4	+4	9	Advance to knockout stage	—	3–1	2–1	3–2
2	Mohun Bagan	3	2	0	1	5	5	0	6		—	—	2–1	2–1
3	Sreenidi Deccan	3	1	0	2	6	5	+1	3		—	—	—	4–1
4	Hyderabad	3	0	0	3	4	9	−5	0		—	—	—	—

Source: AIFF
Rules for classification: 1) points; 2) head-to-head points; 3) head-to-head goal difference; 4) goal difference; 5) number of goals scored; 6) drawing of lots

=== Group B ===
Pos	Team	Pld	W	D	L	GF	GA	GD	Pts	Qualification	JAM	NEU	KER	SHL
1	Jamshedpur	3	3	0	0	7	3	+4	9	Advance to knockout stage	—	2–1	2–3	2–0
2	NorthEast United	3	2	0	1	7	4	+3	6		—	—	4–1	2–1
3	Kerala Blasters	3	1	0	2	6	8	−2	3		—	—	—	3–1
4	Shillong Lajong	3	0	0	3	2	7	−5	0		—	—	—	—

Source: AIFF
Rules for classification: 1) points; 2) head-to-head points; 3) head-to-head goal difference; 4) goal difference; 5) number of goals scored; 6) drawing of lots

=== Group C ===
Pos	Team	Pld	W	D	L	GF	GA	GD	Pts	Qualification	MCI	CHE	PFC	GOK
1	Mumbai City	3	3	0	0	6	3	+3	9	Advance to knockout stage	—	1–0	3–2	2–1
2	Chennaiyin	3	1	1	1	3	2	+1	4		—	—	1–1	2–0
3	Punjab	3	0	2	1	3	4	−1	2		—	—	—	0–0
4	Gokulam Kerala	3	0	1	2	1	4	−3	1		—	—	—	—

Source: AIFF
Rules for classification: 1) points; 2) head-to-head points; 3) head-to-head goal difference; 4) goal difference; 5) number of goals scored; 6) drawing of lots

=== Group D ===
Pos	Team	Pld	W	D	L	GF	GA	GD	Pts	Qualification	OFC	FCG	BEN	IKA
1	Odisha	3	3	0	0	7	2	+5	9	Advance to knockout stage	—	3–2	1–0	3–0
2	Goa	3	2	0	1	5	4	+1	6		—	—	1–0	2–1
3	Bengaluru	3	0	1	2	1	3	−2	1		—	—	—	1–1
4	Inter Kashi	3	0	1	2	2	6	−4	1		—	—	—	—

Source: AIFF
Rules for classification: 1) points; 2) head-to-head points; 3) head-to-head goal difference; 4) goal difference; 5) number of goals scored; 6) drawing of lots

== Knockout stage ==
=== Bracket ===
Semifinals
A1	East Bengal	2
B1	Jamshedpur	0
C1	Mumbai City	0
D1	Odisha	1

Final
SFW1	East Bengal (a.e.t.)	3
SFW2	Odisha	2

=== Semi-finals ===
24 January 2024
19:30 IST
SF1

East Bengal	2–0	Jamshedpur
Maher 19'; Siverio 47'	Report

Kalinga Stadium, Bhubaneswar
Attendance: 1,080
Referee: Rahul Kumar Gupta

25 January 2024
19:30 IST
SF2

Mumbai City	0–1	Odisha
	Report	Mauricio 44' (pen.)

Kalinga Stadium, Bhubaneswar
Attendance: 3,348
Referee: Harish Kundu

=== Final ===
28 January 2024
19:30 IST
Final

East Bengal	3–2 (a.e.t.)	Odisha
Sekar 51'; Crespo 62' (pen.); Silva 111'	Report	Maurício 39'; Jahouh 90+9' (pen.)

Kalinga Stadium, Bhubaneswar
Attendance: 10,121
Referee: Venkatesh R.

== Top scorers ==
Rank	Player	Club	Goals
1	(Brazil) Cleiton Silva	East Bengal	5
2	(Morocco) Ahmed Jahouh	Odisha	3
2	(Spain) Carlos Martínez	Goa	3
2	(Spain) Néstor Albiach	NorthEast United	3
2	(Brazil) Diego Maurício	Odisha	3
2	(Nigeria) Daniel Chima Chukwu	Jamshedpur	3
2	(India) Ayush Chhikara	Mumbai City	3
2	(Greece) Dimitrios Diamantakos	Kerala Blasters	3
3	(Ghana) Kwame Peprah	Kerala Blasters	2
3	(Spain) Mario Barco	Inter Kashi	2
3	(India) Ramhlunchhunga	Hyderabad	2
3	(Brazil) William Alves	Sreenidi Deccan	2
3	(Slovenia) Luka Majcen	Punjab	2
3	(Senegal) Mourtada Fall	Odisha	2
3	(India) Edmund Lalrindika	Inter Kashi	2
3	(Spain) Saúl Crespo	East Bengal	2
3	(India) Nandhakumar Sekar	East Bengal	2
3	(Spain) Javier Siverio	East Bengal	2
3	(Jordan) Hijazi Maher	East Bengal	2

== Awards ==
Award	Winner	Club	Prize
Best Goalkeeper	Lalthuammawia Ralte	Odisha	₹ 2,50,000
Best Defender	Hijazi Maher	East Bengal	₹ 2,50,000
Best Midfielder	Ahmed Jahouh	Odisha	₹ 2,50,000
Highest Goalscorer	Cleiton Silva	East Bengal	₹ 2,50,000
Player of the Tournament	Isak Vanlalruatfela	Odisha	₹ 2,50,000
Runners-up	Odisha		₹ 15,00,000
Champions	East Bengal		₹ 25,00,000
Source: AIFF

== Broadcasting ==
The 2024 Kalinga Super Cup is streaming live on JioCinema.

== See also ==
- Men
  - 2023-24 Indian Super League (Tier I)
  - 2023–24 I-League (Tier II)
  - 2023–24 I-League 2 (Tier III)
  - 2023–24 I-League 3 (Tier IV)
  - 2023–24 Indian State Leagues (Tier V)
  - 2023 Durand Cup
  - 2024 Reliance Foundation Development League
- Women
  - 2023–24 Indian Women's League
  - 2023–24 Indian Women's League 2
