= 2025–26 Bengal Super League =

1st season of the Bengal Super League

Bengal Super League
- Season: 2025–26
- Dates: 14 December 2025 – 1 February 2026
- Champions: Howrah Hooghly Warriors (1st title)
- Matches: 61
- Goals: 163 (2.67 per match)
- Top goalscorer: Paulo Cezar Richmond Kwasi (11 goals each)
- Best goalkeeper: Sourav Samanta
- Highest scoring: 8–1; North Bengal United vs Medinipur
- Longest winning run: 4 matches Burdwan Blasters; Sundarban Bengal Auto
- Longest unbeaten run: 12 matches JHR Royal City
- Longest winless run: 11 matches Kopa Tigers Birbhum
- Longest losing run: 7 matches Medinipur

The 2025–26 Bengal Super League was the inaugural season of the Bengal Super League, a men's professional franchise football league in West Bengal, India. It is organised by the Indian Football Association (IFA) and Shrachi Sports. It featured 8 clubs and held matches across West Bengal.

== Clubs ==
Locations of the BSL clubs

Club	City	Stadium	Capacity
Burdwan Blasters (Note: The club is based in Bardhaman but will play its home games in Bolpur.)	Bardhaman	Spandan Stadium	4,000
Howrah Hooghly Warriors (Note: The club is based in Howrah but will play two home games in Kalyani.)	Howrah	Sailen Manna Stadium	15,000
JHR Royal City (Note: The club will play first four home games in Malda and last three in Berhampore.)	Malda	DSA Malda Stadium	15,000
JHR Royal City	Berhampore	Berhampore Stadium	5,000
Kopa Tigers Birbhum (Note: The club is based in Bolpur but will play one home game in Kalyani.)	Bolpur	Bolpur Stadium	15,000
Medinipur	Midnapore	Sri Aurobindo Stadium	10,000
North 24 Parganas	Naihati	Bankimanjali Stadium	25,000
North Bengal United	Siliguri	Kanchenjunga Stadium	40,000
Sundarban Bengal Auto	Canning	Canning Sports Complex	12,000

== Personnel and sponsorship ==
Club	Head coach	Captain	Kit manufacturer	Shirt sponsor
Burdwan Blasters	(India) Sandip Nandy	(India) Deep Halder		
Howrah Hooghly Warriors	(Brazil) José Barreto	(India) Avilash Paul	(India) Trak Only	Jaya Industries
JHR Royal City	(India) (Nigeria) Saheed Ramon	(India) Salman Kalliyath	(India) Hanzala Interior Designer	JHR Group
Kopa Tigers Birbhum	(England) (Bulgaria) Georgi Raev	(Tajikistan) Komron Tursunov	(India) Trak Only	Accompany Group
Medinipur	(India) Jayanta Sen	(Ghana) Nuhu Seidu Issahak	(India) Trak Only	
North 24 Parganas	(India) Goutam Ghosh	(India) Tarak Hembram	(India) Trak Only	
North Bengal United	(India) Biswajit Bhattacharya	(India) Amit Chakraborty	(India) Silco	
Sundarban Bengal Auto	(India) Mehtab Hossain	(India) Sena Ralte	(India) Trak Only	TVS Apache Series

== Foreign players ==
Clubs must include a minimum of seven state-grown players, including under-19 footballers, along with up to two foreign and two outstation players in the playing XI.

Club	Player 1	Player 2	Player 3	Player 4
Burdwan Blasters	(Ghana) Komenan Issifou	(Senegal) Modou Mbengue	(Nigeria) Christopher Chizoba	(Uganda) Latif Kiyemba
Howrah Hooghly Warriors	(Brazil) Paulo Cézar	(Ivory Coast) William Sessegnon	(Senegal) Seila Toure	
JHR Royal City	(Ivory Coast) Adama Coulibaly	(Brazil) Alê Júnior	(Brazil) João Vitor De Paula	(Brazil) Tchê Tchê
Kopa Tigers Birbhum	(Tajikistan) Komron Tursunov			
Medinipur	(Ghana) Nuhu Seidu Issahak	(Ghana) Kwame Oppong	(Ivory Coast) Sie Outtara	(Uganda) Raymond Onyai
North 24 Parganas	(Argentina) Joshua Quintana Ortuzar			
North Bengal United	(Ghana) Ebenezer Amoh	(Ghana) Abdul Samed Ango		
Sundarban Bengal Auto	(Ghana) Suleman Mohammed	(Ghana) Richmond Kwasi	(Uganda) Henry Kisekka	

== League table ==
Pos	Team	Pld	W	D	L	GF	GA	GD	Pts	Qualification
1	JHR Royal City	14	7	6	1	22	5	+17	27	Advance to semi-finals
2	Howrah Hooghly Warriors	14	8	3	3	29	16	+13	27	Advance to semi-finals
3	Sundarban Bengal Auto	14	7	3	4	20	11	+9	24	Advance to semi-finals
4	North 24 Parganas	14	6	5	3	19	13	+6	23	Advance to semi-finals
5	North Bengal United	14	6	2	6	18	12	+6	20	
6	Burdwan Blasters	14	5	4	5	18	16	+2	19	
7	Medinipur	14	2	2	10	11	39	−28	8	
8	Kopa Tigers Birbhum	14	1	3	10	10	35	−25	6	

Source: Bengal Super League

== Penalty shootout table ==
Pos	Team	Pld	W	D	L	GF	GA	GD	Pts	Qualification
1	North 24 Parganas	14	8	5	1	0	0	0	29	Penalty shoot-out Cup Winners
2	North Bengal United	14	7	3	4	0	0	0	24	
3	Howrah Hooghly Warriors	14	6	5	3	0	0	0	23	
4	Medinipur	14	4	5	5	0	0	0	17	
5	Sundarban Bengal Auto	14	4	5	5	0	0	0	17	
6	Burdwan Blasters	14	4	4	6	0	0	0	16	
7	JHR Royal City	14	4	4	6	0	0	0	16	
8	Kopa Tigers Birbhum	14	1	5	8	0	0	0	8	

Source: Bengal Super League

== Results ==
Home \ Away	BUB	HHW	JRC	KTB	MED	NPG	NBU	SBA
BUB	—	4–1	0–1	1–1	1–1	0–0	0–2	1–2
HHW	2–1	—	0–0	3–0	3–1	3–2	0–1	1–2
JRC	3–0	1–1	—	2–0	6–1	2–0	3–1	0–1
KTB	1–3	0–4	1–4	—	5–1	1–1	1–2	0–7
MED	1–4	0–5	0–0	1–0	—	1–2	1–8	0–2
NPG	1–1	1–2	0–2	4–0	2–1	—	2–1	1–1
NBU	0–1	1–2	0–0	0–0	1–0	0–1	—	1–0
SBA	0–1	2–2	0–0	2–0	0–2	0–2	1–0	—

Source: Bengal Super League
Legend: Blue = home team win; Yellow = draw; Red = away team win.

=== Results by match ===
Match	1	2	3	4	5	6	7	8	9	10	11	12	13	14
Burdwan Blasters	L	D	L	L	L	W	W	W	W	D	W	D	L	D
JHR Royal City	W	L	W	W	W	D	D	W	D	D	D	W	W	D
Howrah Hooghly Warriors	W	W	L	W	W	L	D	W	W	W	D	L	W	D
Kopa Tigers Birbhum	L	L	L	D	L	D	L	L	L	L	L	D	L	W
Medinipur	L	D	L	L	W	D	W	L	L	L	L	L	L	L
North 24 Parganas	W	L	W	L	D	D	W	L	W	D	W	D	D	W
North Bengal United	L	W	W	D	L	W	L	L	D	W	W	L	W	L
Sundarban Bengal Auto	W	W	W	W	D	L	L	W	L	D	W	L	W	D

Source: Bengal Super League
W = Win; D = Draw; L = Loss

=== Positions by round ===
Team ╲ Round	1	2	3	4	5	6	7	8	9	10	11	12	13	14
Burdwan Blasters	5	6	7	7	7	7	7	5	5	5	5	6	6	6
JHR Royal City	3	4	3	2	2	1	1	1	2	2	2	2	2	2
Howrah Hooghly Warriors	2	1	4	3	3	3	3	2	1	1	1	3	1	1
Kopa Tigers Birbhum	8	8	8	8	8	8	8	8	8	8	8	8	8	8
Medinipur	6	7	6	6	6	6	6	7	7	7	7	7	7	7
North 24 Parganas	1	3	2	5	4	5	4	4	4	4	4	4	4	4
North Bengal United	7	5	5	4	5	4	5	6	6	6	6	5	5	5
Sundarban Bengal Auto	4	2	1	1	1	2	2	3	3	3	3	1	3	3

Source: Bengal Super League

== Matches ==
=== Round 1 ===
14 December 2025	JHR Royal City	3–1	North Bengal United	Malda
16:00	Hansda 30', 90+7' (pen.); João Vitor De Paula 26'	Report	Adama Coulibaly 50' (o.g.)	Stadium: DSA Malda Stadium; Player of the Match: Robi Hansda (JHR Royal City)

15 December 2025	Burdwan Blasters	1–2	Sundarban Bengal Auto	Bolpur
13:00	Bedashwor 55'	Report	Richmond Kwasi 72'; Aqib Nawab 77'	Stadium: Bolpur Stadium; Player of the Match: Aqib Nawab (Sundarban Bengal Auto)

15 December 2025	North 24 Parganas	4–0	Kopa Tigers Birbhum	Naihati
16:00	Tanmoy Ghosh 16'; Mrinmoy Mahapatra 29'; Zomuansanga 85'; Kuntal Pakhira 86'	Report		Stadium: Bankimanjali Stadium; Player of the Match: Tanmoy Ghosh (North 24 Parganas)

16 December 2025	Howrah Hooghly Warriors	3–1	Medinipur	Howrah
13:00	Paulo Cézar 55', 67' (pen.); Koustav Dutta 85'	Report	Sudip Das 1'	Stadium: Sailen Manna Stadium; Player of the Match: Paulo Cézar (Howrah Hooghly Warriors)

=== Round 2 ===
17 December 2025	Kopa Tigers Birbhum	1–2	North Bengal United	Bolpur
13:00	Akash Mondal 43'	Report	Shlok Tiwari 18', 38'	Stadium: Bolpur Stadium; Player of the Match: Shlok Tiwari (North Bengal United)

17 December 2025	JHR Royal City	0–1	Sundarban Bengal Auto	Malda
16:00		Report	Richmond Kwasi 79'	Stadium: DSA Malda Stadium; Player of the Match: Richmond Kwasi (Sundarban Bengal Auto)

18 December 2025	Burdwan Blasters	1–1	Medinipur	Bolpur
13:00	Mbengue Modou 44'	Report	Somnath Pramanick 63'	Stadium: Bolpur Stadium; Player of the Match: Sudip Kumar Das (Medinipur)

19 December 2025	North 24 Parganas	1–2	Howrah Hooghly Warriors	Naihati
13:00	Kuntal Pakhira 13'	Report	Akash Das 45+3'; Sahil Harijan 81'	Stadium: Bankimanjali Stadium; Player of the Match: Kuntal Pakhira (North 24 Parganas)

=== Round 3 ===
19 December 2025	JHR Royal City	2–0	Kopa Tigers Birbhum	Malda
16:00	Sajan Sahani 32'; Hansda 66' (pen.)	Report		Stadium: DSA Malda Stadium; Player of the Match: Sajan Sahani (JHR Royal City)

20 December 2025	Burdwan Blasters	0–2	North Bengal United	Bolpur
13:00		Report	Sanju Santra 26'; David Motla 61'	Stadium: Bolpur Stadium; Player of the Match: Sanju Santra (North Bengal United)

21 December 2025	North 24 Parganas	2–1	Medinipur	Naihati
16:00	Tarak Hembram 12', 76'	Report	Asish 44'	Stadium: Bankimanjali Stadium; Player of the Match: Tarak Hembram (North 24 Parganas)

22 December 2025	Howrah Hooghly Warriors	1–2	Sundarban Bengal Auto	Kalyani
16:00	Jiyabul Hossain 20'	Report	Aquib Nawab 29' (pen.); Kwasi Richmond 37'	Stadium: Kalyani Stadium; Player of the Match: Subrata Santra (Sundarban Bengal Auto)

=== Round 4 ===
22 December 2025	JHR Royal City	3–0	Burdwan Blasters	Malda
13:00	Hansda 8'; Jota 50', 52'	Report		Stadium: DSA Malda Stadium; Player of the Match: Jota (JHR Royal City)

23 December 2025	North Bengal United	0–0	Kopa Tigers Birbhum	Siliguri
13:00		Report		Stadium: Kanchenjunga Stadium; Player of the Match: Ebenezer Amoh (North Bengal United)

24 December 2025	Medinipur	0–2	Sundarban Bengal Auto	Midnapore
13:00		Report	Md. Tafique 5'; Richmond Kwasi 9'	Stadium: Aurobindo Stadium; Player of the Match: Md. Tafique (Sundarban Bengal Auto)

25 December 2025	Howrah Hooghly Warriors	3–2	North 24 Parganas	Kalyani
16:00	Sahil Harijan 27'; William Sessegnon 44'; Paulo Cézar 90+4'	Report	Quintana Ortuzar 33'; Ankan Bhattacharjee 57'	Stadium: Kalyani Stadium; Player of the Match: Paulo Cézar (Howrah Hooghly Warriors)

=== Round 5 ===
26 December 2025	Burdwan Blasters	0–1	JHR Royal City	Bolpur
13:00	Hansda 90+3' (pen.)	Report		Stadium: Bolpur Stadium; Player of the Match: Adama Coulibaly (JHR Royal City)

27 December 2025	North 24 Parganas	1–1	Sundarban Bengal Auto	Naihati
13:00	Zomuansanga 90+1'	Report	Aquib Nawab 47'	Stadium: Bankimanjali Stadium; Player of the Match: Zomuansanga (North 24 Parganas)

27 December 2025	Medinipur	1–0	Kopa Tigers Birbhum	Midnapore
16:00	Arpan Seth 49'	Report		Stadium: Aurobindo Stadium; Player of the Match: Arpan Seth (Medinipur)

28 December 2025	North Bengal United	1–2	Howrah Hooghly Warriors	Siliguri
13:00	Ebenezer Amoh 19'	Report	Paulo Cézar 49'; David Singh Lourembam 78'	Stadium: Kanchenjunga Stadium; Player of the Match: David Singh Lourembam (Howrah Hooghly Warriors)

=== Round 6 ===
29 December 2025	Medinipur	0–0	JHR Royal City	Midnapore
13:00		Report		Stadium: Aurobindo Stadium; Player of the Match: Sudip Kumar Das (Medinipur)

30 December 2025	North Bengal United	1–0	Sundarban Bengal Auto	Siliguri
13:00	Abdul Samed Ango 90+4'	Report		Stadium: Kanchenjunga Stadium; Player of the Match: Raja Barman (North Bengal United)

30 December 2025	Kopa Tigers Birbhum	1–1	North 24 Parganas	Bolpur
16:00	Marshal Hembram 42'	Report	Rohmingthanga 29'	Stadium: Bolpur Stadium; Player of the Match: Tarak Hembram (North 24 Parganas)

31 December 2025	Burdwan Blasters	4–1	Howrah Hooghly Warriors	Bolpur
13:00	Chizoba 2', 28'; Gautam Virwani 4'; Howladar 19'	Report	Faiz Khan 80'	Stadium: Bolpur Stadium; Player of the Match: Christopher Chizoba (Burdwan Blasters)

=== Round 7 ===
1 January 2026	Sundarban Bengal Auto	0–2	Medinipur	Canning
13:00		Report	Sudip Kumar Das 45+3'; Kush 81'	Stadium: Canning Sports Complex; Player of the Match: Sayan Roy (Medinipur)

2 January 2026	Howrah Hooghly Warriors	0–0	JHR Royal City	Howrah
13:00		Report		Stadium: Sailen Manna Stadium; Player of the Match: Avilash Paul (Howrah Hooghly Warriors)

2 January 2026	Kopa Tigers Birbhum	1–3	Burdwan Blasters	Bolpur
16:00	Marshal Hembram 8'	Report	Latif Kiyemba 50', 74'; Chizoba 58'	Stadium: Bolpur Stadium; Player of the Match: Latif Kiyemba (Burdwan Blasters)

3 January 2026	North Bengal United	0–1	North 24 Parganas	Siliguri
13:00		Report	Zomuansanga 81'	Stadium: Kanchenjunga Stadium; Player of the Match: Zomuansanga (North 24 Parganas)

=== Round 8 ===
4 January 2026	Sundarban Bengal Auto	2–0	Kopa Tigers Birbhum	Canning
13:00	Richmond Kwasi 6'; Aquib Nawab 38'	Report		Stadium: Canning Sports Complex; Player of the Match: Richmond Kwasi (Sundarban Bengal Auto)

5 January 2026	North 24 Parganas	0–2	JHR Royal City	Naihati
13:00		Report	Hansda 21'; Riswan Shoukath 51'	Stadium: Bankimanjali Stadium; Player of the Match: Sourav Samanta (JHR Royal City)

5 January 2026	North Bengal United	0–1	Burdwan Blasters	Siliguri
16:00		Report	Latif Kiyemba 28'	Stadium: Kanchenjunga Stadium; Player of the Match: Latif Kiyemba (Burdwan Blasters)

6 January 2026	Medinipur	0–5	Howrah Hooghly Warriors	Midnapore
13:00		Report	Koustav Dutta 16', 72'; Paulo Cézar 26'; Mallick 61'; Subhradip 90+3'	Stadium: Aurobindo Stadium; Player of the Match: Koustav Dutta (Howrah Hooghly Warriors)

=== Round 9 ===
7 January 2026	North Bengal United	0–0	JHR Royal City	Siliguri
16:00		Report		Stadium: Kanchenjunga Stadium; Player of the Match: David Motla (North Bengal United)

8 January 2026	Medinipur	1–2	North 24 Parganas	Midnapore
13:00	Sie Outtara 9'	Report	Amit 14'; Zoumansanga 35'	Stadium: Aurobindo Stadium; Player of the Match: Ankan Bhattacharya (North 24 Parganas)

8 January 2026	Sundarban Bengal Auto	0–1	Burdwan Blasters	Canning
16:00		Report	Chizoba 9'	Stadium: Canning Sports Complex

9 January 2026	Howrah Hooghly Warriors	3–0	Kopa Tigers Birbhum	Howrah
13:00	Faiz Iftikar 74'; Adarsh Tamang 78' (pen.); Sk. Jiyabul 89'	Report		Stadium: Sailen Manna Stadium; Player of the Match: Adarsh Tamang (Howrah Hooghly Warriors)

=== Round 10 ===
10 January 2026	North Bengal United	1–0	Medinipur	Siliguri
13:00	David Motla 55'	Report		Stadium: Kanchenjunga Stadium; Player of the Match: Raja Barman (North Bengal United)

11 January 2026	Sundarban Bengal Auto	0–0	JHR Royal City	Canning
13:00		Report		Stadium: Canning Sports Complex; Player of the Match: Faisal Ali (JHR Royal City)

11 January 2026	Kopa Tigers Birbhum	0–4	Howrah Hooghly Warriors	Bolpur
16:00		Report	Toure 10'; Paswan 63'; Lourembam David Singh 73'; Aman 87'	Stadium: Bolpur Stadium

12 January 2026	Burdwan Blasters	0–0	North 24 Parganas	Bolpur
16:00		Report		Stadium: Bolpur Stadium

=== Round 11 ===
13 January 2026	Kopa Tigers Birbhum	0–7	Sundarban Bengal Auto	Bolpur
13:00		Report		Stadium: Bolpur Stadium

14 January 2026	JHR Royal City	1–1	Howrah Hooghly Warriors	Kalyani
13:00		Report		Stadium: Kalyani Stadium

26 January 2026	North 24 Parganas	2–1	North Bengal United	Naihati
13:00		Report		Stadium: Bankimanjali Stadium

15 January 2026	Medinipur	1–4	Burdwan Blasters	Midnapore
13:00		Report		Stadium: Aurobindo Stadium

=== Round 12 ===
16 January 2026	Howrah Hooghly Warriors	0–1	North Bengal United	Howrah
13:00		Report		Stadium: Sailen Manna Stadium

17 January 2026	JHR Royal City	6–1	Medinipur	Kalyani
13:00		Report		Stadium: Kalyani Stadium

17 January 2026	Burdwan Blasters	1–1	Kopa Tigers Birbhum	Bolpur
16:00		Report		Stadium: Bolpur Stadium

18 January 2026	Sundarban Bengal Auto	0–2	North 24 Parganas	Canning
13:00		Report		Stadium: Canning Sports Complex

=== Round 13 ===
19 January 2026	Kopa Tigers Birbhum	1–4	JHR Royal City	Bolpur
13:00		Report		Stadium: Bolpur Stadium

24 January 2026	Medinipur	1–8	North Bengal United	Kalyani
13:00		Report		Stadium: Kalyani Stadium

20 January 2026	Howrah Hooghly Warriors	2–1	Burdwan Blasters	Naihati
13:00		Report		Stadium: Sailen Manna Stadium

21 January 2026	JHR Royal City	0–0	North 24 Parganas	Naihati
13:00		Report		Stadium: Sailen Manna Stadium

=== Round 14 ===
21 January 2026	Sundarban Bengal Auto	1–0	North Bengal United	Canning
16:00		Report		Stadium: Canning Sports Complex

22 January 2026	Kopa Tigers Birbhum	5–1	Medinipur	Bolpur
13:00		Report		Stadium: Bolpur Stadium

23 January 2026	North 24 Parganas	1–1	Burdwan Blasters	Naihati
13:00		Report		Stadium: Bankimanjali Stadium

23 January 2026	Sundarban Bengal Auto	2–2	Howrah Hooghly Warriors	Canning
16:00		Report		Stadium: Canning Sports Complex

== Knockout stage ==
=== Bracket ===
Semi-finals
1	JHR Royal City	0	3	3
4	North 24 Parganas	1	0	1
2	Howrah Hooghly Warriors	4	0	4
3	Sundarban Bengal Auto	3	0	3

Final
1	JHR Royal City	2
2	Howrah Hooghly Warriors	3

=== Semi-finals ===
The first legs were played on 28 January, and the second legs were played on 30 January 2026.

Team 1	Agg.	Team 2	1st leg	2nd leg
JHR Royal City	3–1	North 24 Parganas	0–1	3–0
Howrah Hooghly Warriors	4–3	Sundarban Bengal Auto	4–3	0–0

=== Leg 1 ===
28 January
13:00 IST

JHR Royal City	0–1	North 24 Parganas
	Report

East Bengal Ground, Kolkata

28 January
16:00 IST

Howrah Hooghly Warriors	4–3	Sundarban Bengal Auto
Paulo 41' (pen.), 45+4', 88'; Faiz 66'	Report	Kwasi 54', 74'; Kipgen 89'

Kalyani Stadium, Kalyani

=== Leg 2 ===
30 January
13:00 IST

Sundarban Bengal Auto	0–0	Howrah Hooghly Warriors
	Report

East Bengal Ground, Kolkata

30 January
16:00 IST

North 24 Parganas	0–3	JHR Royal City
	Report	Sourav 24'; Jota 80'; Amil Naim 90'

Kalyani Stadium, Kalyani

=== Final ===
01 February
16:00 IST

JHR Royal City	2–3 (a.e.t.)	Howrah Hooghly Warriors
Sukchand Kisku 45'; Sumit 90+2'	Report	Seila Toure 33'; Deep Gayen 58'; Koustav 120'

Kalyani Stadium, Kalyani

== Season awards ==
Award	Player	Club
Top scorer	Paulo Cézar	Howrah Hooghly Warriors
Top scorer	Richmond Kwasi	Sundarban Bengal Auto
Best player	Adama Coulibaly	JHR Royal City
Best emerging player (U19)	Aman Yadav	Howrah Hooghly Warriors
Best goalkeeper	Sourav Samanta	JHR Royal City
Penalty shoot-out cup	—N/a	North 24 Parganas
Fair play	—N/a	North Bengal United

== Season statistics ==
=== Top goalscorers ===
As of February 2025

Rank	Player	Club	Goals
1	Paulo Cezar		11
1	Richmond Kwasi		11

== See also ==
- 2025 CFL Premier Division
- 2025 IFA Shield
