= North Bengal United FC =

Football franchise in West Bengal

North Bengal United
- Full name: North Bengal United Football Club
- Short name: NBUFC
- Founded: July 2025; 8 months ago
- Ground: Kanchenjunga Stadium
- Capacity: 40,000
- Owner: Narayan Vijan
- Head coach: Biswajit Bhattacharya
- League: Bengal Super League
- 2025–26: Bengal Super League, 5th of 8
Home colours	Away colours

North Bengal United Football Club is an Indian professional football club based in Siliguri, West Bengal, that competes in the Bengal Super League (BSL). Founded in July 2025, the club represents the North Bengal region in the BSL, a district-centric league organized by the Indian Football Association (IFA) in collaboration with Shrachi Sports.

The club is led by former Indian international Biswajit Bhattacharya who has previously coached Kolkata giants East Bengal and Mohun Bagan.

== History ==
North Bengal United's identity was unveiled in July 2025 as part of the mission to bridge the gap between district talent and national-level professional football. In their inaugural campaign, North Bengal United established themselves as a competitive force. Although they lost the opening match 1–3 to JHR Royal City FC on 14 December, they bounced back with consecutive victories. They defeated Kopa Tigers Birbhum 2–1 on 17 December and secured a dominant 2–0 win over Burdwan Blasters on 20 December.

== Stadium ==
The club plays its home matches at the Kanchenjunga Stadium in Siliguri, which is the largest venue in the league with a capacity of 40,000.

== Players ==
=== First-team squad ===
As of 24 December 2025

Note: Flags indicate national team as defined under FIFA eligibility rules; some limited exceptions apply. Players may hold more than one non-FIFA nationality.

No.	Pos.	Nation	Player
—	GK	IND	Sangramjit Roy Chowdhury
—	GK	IND	Raja Barman
1	GK	IND	Debjit Ghoshal
18	DF	IND	Amit Chakraborty (captain)
—	DF	IND	Sonam Zangpo Bhutia
33	DF	GHA	Abdul Samed Ango
—	DF	IND	Rohit Tamang
20	DF	IND	Rajibul Halder
—	DF	IND	Tanmoy Mondal
—	DF	IND	Sudip Hansda
32	MF	GHA	Ebenezer Amoh
—	MF	IND	Rupam Pal

No.	Pos.	Nation	Player
16	MF	IND	Rudra Tudu
19	MF	IND	Sanju Santra
—	MF	IND	Rounak Paul
48	MF	IND	Riki Gharami
—	MF	IND	Andy Mawthigh
—	MF	IND	Abhishek Thapa
—	MF	IND	Arjun Singh Oinam
—	FW	IND	Jhantu Prasad
27	FW	IND	David Motla
—	FW	IND	Rahul Roy
4	FW	IND	Sonam Lepcha
7	FW	IND	Shlok Tiwari

== See also ==
- Football in West Bengal
- Indian Football Association
- Calcutta Football League
