= Sundarban Bengal Auto FC =

Football franchise in West Bengal

Sundarban Bengal Auto
- Full name: Sundarban Bengal Auto Football Club
- Short name: SBAFC
- Founded: July 2025; 8 months ago
- Ground: Canning Sports Complex
- Capacity: 12,000
- Head coach: Mehtab Hossain
- League: Bengal Super League
- 2025–26: Bengal Super League, 3rd of 8 (regular season)
Home colours	Away colours

Sundarban Bengal Auto Football Club is an Indian professional football club based in Canning, West Bengal, that competes in the Bengal Super League (BSL). Founded in July 2025, the club represents the Sundarbans region and is one of the eight inaugural franchises of the BSL, a district-centric professional league organized by the Indian Football Association (IFA) in collaboration with Shrachi Sports.

The club is coached by former Indian national team midfielder and East Bengal legend Mehtab Hossain, who returned to the dugout to lead the franchise in its debut season.

== History ==
Sundarban Bengal Auto FC was established as part of a ten-year vision by the IFA and Shrachi Sports to professionalize football across the districts of West Bengal. The franchise identity was unveiled on 8 July 2025, celebrating the regional pride of the mangrove delta region.

Under the tactical guidance of Mehtab Hossain, the club enjoyed a stellar start to their inaugural campaign. They won their opening match 2–1 against Burdwan Blasters FC on 15 December 2025, with Ghanaian striker Richmond Kwasi scoring the decisive goal from the penalty spot. The club followed this with a 1–0 victory over JHR Royal City FC on 17 December and a 2–1 comeback win against Howrah Hooghly Warriors FC on 22 December.

== Stadium ==
The club's home ground is the Canning Sports Complex in South 24 Parganas, which has a capacity of 12,000. The club also played selected matches at Bolpur Stadium and Naihati Stadium due to the league's centralized fixture schedule.

== Players ==
=== First-team squad ===
As of January 2026

Note: Flags indicate national team as defined under FIFA eligibility rules; some limited exceptions apply. Players may hold more than one non-FIFA nationality.

No.	Pos.	Nation	Player
1	GK	IND	Sanjiban Ghosh
33	GK	IND	Subrata Santra
12	DF	IND	Naba Kumar Das
5	DF	IND	Pawan Pattan
14	DF	GHA	Suleman Mohammed
—	DF	IND	Debdyut
—	DF	IND	Md Mezanur
3	DF	IND	Lalhmangaihsanga
8	MF	IND	Mohammed Rafique (captain)
—	MF	IND	Souvik Ghosal
—	MF	IND	Pradip

No.	Pos.	Nation	Player
—	MF	IND	Kiran
15	MF	IND	Rajesh Rajbhar
19	MF	IND	Md. Yasin
18	MF	IND	Aquib Nawab
—	MF	IND	Lalsiem Chonglai
—	MF	IND	Sahil Mondol
—	MF	IND	Pranendra Singh Thakur
—	MF	IND	Rahul Dowary
27	MF	IND	Md Tafique
—	FW	IND	Naro Hari Shrestha
—	FW	IND	Prateek
9	FW	GHA	Richmond Kwasi
7	FW	IND	Subhonil Ghosh
44	FW	UGA	Henry Kisekka

== Personnel ==
=== Current technical staff ===
Position	Name
Head coach	(India) Mehtab Hossain
Advisor	(India) Ashim Biswas
Goalkeeping coach	(India) Subhasish Roy Chowdhury

== See also ==
- Football in West Bengal
- Indian Football Association
- Calcutta Football League
