= North 24 Parganas FC =

Football franchise in West Bengal

North 24 Parganas
- Full name: North 24 Parganas Football Club
- Short name: N24P FC
- Founded: July 2025; 7 months ago
- Ground: Bankimanjali Stadium
- Capacity: 25,000
- Head coach: Gautam Ghosh
- League: Bengal Super League
- 2025–26: Bengal Super League, 4th of 8 (regular season)
Home colours	Away colours

North 24 Parganas Football Club is an Indian professional football club based in Naihati, West Bengal, that competes in the Bengal Super League (BSL). Founded in July 2025, it is one of the eight inaugural franchises of the BSL, a district-based league sanctioned by the Indian Football Association (IFA) in partnership with Shrachi Sports.

The club represents the North 24 Parganas district and is coached by Gautam Ghosh, a seasoned tactical veteran of the Bengal football circuit.

== History ==
The club was established in mid-2025 to harness the footballing potential of North 24 Parganas, a region traditionally known as a "cradle of Bengali football".

In the inaugural season, North 24 Parganas FC enjoyed a dominant start. On 15 December 2025, they secured a convincing 4–0 victory over Kopa Tigers Birbhum at the Naihati Stadium. They followed this with a hard-fought 2–1 win over FC Medinipur on 21 December.

== Stadium ==
The club's home ground is the Bankimanjali Stadium in Naihati, which has a capacity of 25,000. The stadium is one of the premier venues for the Bengal Super League, frequently hosting matches for other franchises due to its high-quality lighting and playing surface.

== Players ==
=== First-team squad ===
As of 24 December 2025

Note: Flags indicate national team as defined under FIFA eligibility rules; some limited exceptions apply. Players may hold more than one non-FIFA nationality.

No.	Pos.	Nation	Player
—	GK	IND	Suraj Ali
—	GK	IND	Rakesh Bahadur
—	DF	IND	Lalrempuia
—	DF	IND	Rohmingthanga
—	DF	IND	Susovan Ghosh
—	DF	IND	Ankan Bhattacharjee
—	DF	IND	Mohan Sarkar
—	DF	IND	Hritik Rawat
—	MF	IND	Tarak Hembram
—	MF	IND	Tanmoy Ghosh

No.	Pos.	Nation	Player
—	MF	IND	Kuntal Pakhira
—	MF	IND	Aditya Thapa
—	MF	IND	Tushar Ghosh
—	MF	IND	Debojyoti Das
—	MF	IND	Abhisek Bhujel
—	FW	IND	Sk. Samir
—	FW	IND	Sujal Munda
—	FW	IND	Mrinmoy Mahapatra
—	FW	IND	Lalremruata
—	FW	IND	Shohel Mandal
—	FW	IND	Zoumansanga
—	FW	ARG	Joshua Quintana Ortuzar

== See also ==
- Football in West Bengal
- Indian Football Association
- Calcutta Football League
