= 2025 CFL Premier Division =

127th edition of CFL Premier Division

CFL Premier Division
- Season: 2025
- Dates: Group stage: 25 June – 6 September 2025; Super Six: 11–22 September 2025; Relegation round: 10–15 September 2025
- Champions: East Bengal (41st title)
- Relegated: Southern Samity; Army Red
- Matches: 174
- Goals: 471 (2.71 per match)
- Top goalscorer: Bidyashagar Singh (9 goals)
- Biggest home win: Suruchi Sangha 6–0 Measurers (7 July 2025)
- Biggest away win: Measurers 1–7 East Bengal (27 June 2025); Behala SS 0–6 East Bengal (29 July 2025)
- Highest scoring: Measurers 1–7 East Bengal (27 June 2025); Southern Samity 2–6 Kidderpore (21 August 2025)
- Longest winning run: United SC; United Kolkata (5 matches)
- Longest unbeaten run: Peerless (10 matches)
- Longest winless run: Southern Samity (12 matches)

The 2025 CFL Premier Division was the 127th overall season of the Calcutta Football League – highest state-level football division of West Bengal. The 2025-26 edition has 26 teams divided into two groups of 13 in the first phase, with top 6 qualifying for the championship round and bottom 6 heading into the relegation round.

The tournament began with match between BSS Sporting Club and Kalighat Milan Sangha in Bankimanjali Stadium, Naihati on 25 June 2025 after few prolific hours of opening ceremony.

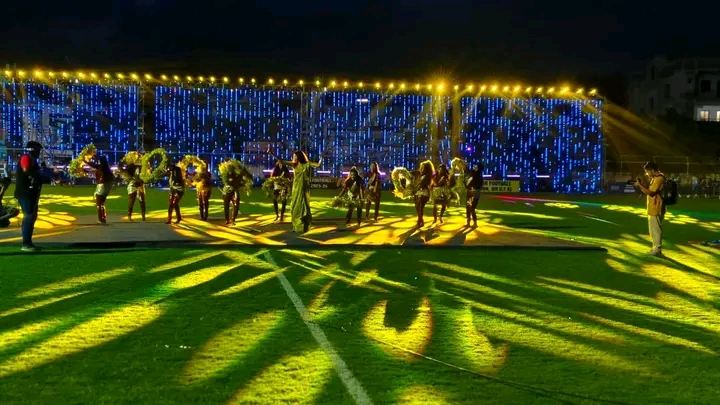
Naihati stadium during CFL opening ceremony

This year's Calcutta Premier Division is having a trophy for the champions named after legendary footballer Pradip Kumar Banerjee.

== Changes from last season ==
▼ Relegated to 2025 CFL 1st Division

- Eastern Railway FC
- Tollygunge Agragami FC

▲ Promoted to 2025 CFL Premier Division

- Sribhumi FC
- United Kolkata SC

== Format ==
The 2025 CFL Premier Division, like the 2024–25 CFL Premier Division, will have twenty-six teams divided into two groups in the first phase, where each team will play twelve matches in single round robin format. After that, top three teams from the two groups shall proceed to the championship round, where each team shall play five more matches to determine the champion. The bottom three teams from both groups will play the relegation round.

Draw for the group division was done on 28th May 2025 at Calcutta Rowing Club Auditorium by Indian Football Association.

== Venues ==
- Amal Datta Krirangan, Dum Dum
- Bankimanjali Stadium, Naihati
- Bibhutibhushan Bandyopadhyay Stadium, Barrackpore
- Bidhannagar Municipal Sports Complex, Bidhannagar
- Chakdaha Stadium, Chakdaha
- East Bengal/Aryan Ground, Kolkata
- Eastern Ground, Chinsurah
- Kalyani Stadium, Kalyani
- Kishore Bharati Krirangan, Kolkata
- Mohammedan/Howrah Union Ground, Kolkata
- Mohun Bagan/Calcutta FC Ground, Kolkata
- Netaji Sports Complex, Kamalgazi
- Rabindra Sarobar Stadium, Kolkata
- Uluberia Stadium, Howrah
- Vivekananda Yuba Bharati Krirangan, Kolkata

== Teams ==
Group A			Group B		
Team	Head coach	Captain	Team	Head coach	Captain
Army Red	(India) Sudhir Mishra	(India) Renzong Lepcha	Bhawanipore	(Nigeria) Shahid Raman	(India) Jiten Murmu
Calcutta Customs	(India) Biswajit Bhattacharya	(India) Amit Chakraborty	Aryan	(India) Rajdeep Nandy	(India) Sandip Patra
BSS	(India) Souren Dutta	(India) Subhankar Das	Calcutta Police Club	(India) Bijoy Ghosh	(India) Koushik Goala
East Bengal	(India) Bino George	(India) Aditya Patra	Diamond Harbour	(Spain) Kibu Vicuna	(India) Bikramjit Singh
Kalighat MS	(India) Patham Thapa	(India) Koushik Sarkar	United Kolkata SC	(India) Yan Law	(India) Narayan Das
George Telegraph	(India) Goutam Ghosh	(India) Sourish Lodh Chowdhury	Sribhumi	(India) Goutam Ghosh	(India) Rana Gharami
Measurers Club	(India) Rajib Dey	(India) Chattu Mondal	Wari	(India) Swapan Biswas	(India) Kamran Farooque
Mohun Bagan SG	(India) Deggie Cardozo	(India) Suhail Bhat	Mohammedan Sporting	(India) Alison Kharsyntiew	(India) Samad Ali Mallick
Pathachakra	(India) Partha Sen	(India) Subhajit Mandi	Peerless	(India) Hemanta Dora	(India) Donlad Diengdoh
Police AC	(India) Rajesh Rajbhar	(India) Deep Dey	Southern Samity	(India) Sujata Kar	(India) Rajesh Rajbhar
Railway	(India) Amit Tudu	(India) Sudipta Banerjee	United SC	(India) Lalkamal Bhowmick	(India) Tarak Hembram
Suruchi Sangha	(India) Ranjan Bhattacharya	(India) Amit Tudu	Rainbow	(India) Aditya Chatterjee	(India) Sourav Dasgupta
Kalighat Sports Lovers Association	(India) Jahar Das	(India) Bishal Chhetri	Kidderpore	(India) Sayantan Das Roy	(India) Prosenjit Chakroborty

== Group stage ==
=== Group A ===
Pos	Team	Pld	W	D	L	GF	GA	GD	Pts	Qualification	EAB	SUS	CCU	PAC	PTC	MBG	BSS	KSL	GGT	MEA	KMS	RLY	ARM (Note: Army Red didn't field their team in group stage, thus IFA gave free 3 points to all other teams of Group A with 3–0 victory.)
1	East Bengal	12	8	2	2	33	10	+23	26	Super Six round		1–1	2–2	0–2		3–2		1–0	4–0				
2	Suruchi Sangha	12	7	4	1	27	8	+19	25	Super Six round			2–2	2–2				0–1	3–0	6–0		2–0	3–0
3	Calcutta Customs	12	7	4	1	21	10	+11	25	Super Six round				1–0	3–1		0–0	2–1		1–2			
4	Police AC	12	7	3	2	24	8	+16	24						5–0		4–1			2–1	1–1		3–0
5	Pathachakra	12	6	1	5	15	16	−1	19		1–0	0–1								1–0			3–0
6	Mohun Bagan SG	12	6	2	4	24	14	+10	18 (Note: Mohun Bagan were deducted 2 points as punishment for not playing match vs Measurers.)			1–1	0–1	0–1	5–2			4–0	0–0				
7	BSS	12	5	2	5	15	21	−6	17		0–6	1–2			2–0	2–5		1–0			1–0	0–0	
8	Kalighat SLA	12	5	1	6	10	14	−4	16					0–0	0–2					1–0	2–1	2–0	3–0
9	George Telegraph	12	4	2	6	16	20	−4	14				1–2	0–3	0–2		3–2	3–0		3–0	1–2		
10	Measurers Club	12	4	1	7	12	23	−11	13		1–7					3–0 (Note: Mohun Bagan didn't field their team, though players of Measurers Club were present at the ground. IFA counted it as a 3–0 victory to Measurers.)	1–2				1–0	0–0	3–0
11	Kalighat MS	12	3	3	6	12	16	−4	12	Relegation round	1–3	0–4	1–1		0–0	1–2						2–0	
12	Railway FC	12	2	3	7	7	20	−13	9	Relegation round	0–3		0–3	2–1	0–3	0–2			2–2				3–0
13	Army Red (Note: Army Red didn't field their team in group stage, thus IFA gave free 3 points to all other teams of Group A with 3–0 victory.)	12	0	0	12	0	36	−36	0	Relegation round	0–3		0–3			0–3	0–3		0–3		0–3		

Source: The Away End
Rules for classification: 1) points; 2) head-to-head points; 3) head-to-head goal difference; 4) goal difference; 5) number of goals scored; 6) drawing of lots

=== Group B ===
Pos	Team	Pld	W	D	L	GF	GA	GD	Pts	Qualification	UTD	DIH	UKS	BHA	PRL	RNB	SRB	KID	WAR	ARY	MDS	CPC	SOU
1	United SC	12	8	3	1	18	6	+12	27	Super Six round			0–1		1–1	2–1			2–0	2–1	3–0	2–1	
2	Diamond Harbour	12	7	4	1	16	5	+11	25	Super Six round	0–2		0–0				0–0	2–0	1–0	1–0	1–0	4–0	
3	United Kolkata SC	12	7	3	2	21	7	+14	24	Super Six round				1–2		1–0				3–0	1–1		
4	Bhawanipore	12	6	4	2	21	7	+14	22		0–0	0–1						5–0	3–0				
5	Peerless	12	5	6	1	14	6	+8	21			1–1	1–0	0–0			4–0						2–1
6	Rainbow	12	5	5	2	22	9	+13	20			2–2		1–1	0–0		1–1			4–0	2–1	3–0	
7	Sribhumi	12	4	6	2	19	15	+4	18		1–1		0–0	2–2				3–0			1–3	3–1	
8	Kidderpore	12	5	1	6	18	26	−8	16		0–1		0–4		1–1	1–4			1–0	2–0	3–2	4–2	
9	Wari	12	4	1	7	10	26	−16	13				0–5		1–1	0–4	1–5			3–2			1–0
10	Aryan	12	4	0	8	9	18	−9	12					1–0	1–0		0–1					1–0	3–1
11	Mohammedan	12	3	2	7	14	19	−5	11	Relegation round				1–2	0–1				1–2	1–0			
12	Calcutta Police Club	12	1	1	10	8	28	−20	4	Relegation round			0–1	0–4	0–2				1–2		2–2		
13	Southern Samity	12	0	2	10	10	28	−18	0 (Note: Southern Samity were deducted 2 points as punishment for not playing match vs Diamond Harbour.)	Relegation round	0–2	0–3 (Note: Southern Samity gave walkover, resulting a 0–3 victory for Diamond Harbour.)	3–4	0–2		0–0	2–2	2–6			1–2	0–1	

Source: The Away End
Rules for classification: 1) points; 2) head-to-head points; 3) head-to-head goal difference; 4) goal difference; 5) number of goals scored; 6) drawing of lots

== Super Six ==
The top three teams from both groups qualified for the Super Six round with the points from the group stage being not carried over. Each team will be playing three matches against the qualified teams from the other group. Team getting highest points will be adjudged as champions.

Indian Super League, I-League 2, I-League 3 and institutional teams are ineligible for 2026–27 I-League 3 season.

=== Qualified teams ===
The six qualified teams for the Super Six phase from both the groups:

Group A	Group B
East Bengal	United SC
Suruchi Sangha	Diamond Harbour
Calcutta Customs	United Kolkata SC

=== Standings & Fixtures ===
Pos	Team	Pld	W	D	L	GF	GA	GD	Pts	Qualification	EAB^{(EAB)}	UTD^{(UTD)}	SUS	DIH^{(DIH)}	UKS	CCU
1	East Bengal^{(ISL)} (C)	3	3	0	0	8	2	+6	9	Champions				3–1	3–0	
2	United SC^{(IL2)}	3	1	1	1	5	4	+1	4		1–2		2–2			
3	Suruchi Sangha (Q)	3	1	1	1	5	6	−1	4	Eligible for I-League 3 (Note: If the top teams are already playing in national leagues, then the next highest ranked team(s) would be eligible for I-League 3.)				0–4		
4	Diamond Harbour^{(IL)}	3	1	0	2	5	5	0	3							0–2
5	United Kolkata (Q)	3	1	0	2	5	6	−1	3	Eligible for I-League 3 (Note: If the top teams are already playing in national leagues, then the next highest ranked team(s) would be eligible for I-League 3.)			0–3			
6	Calcutta Customs	3	1	0	2	2	7	−5	3			0–2			0–5	

Source: The Away End
Rules for classification: 1) points; 2) head-to-head points; 3) head-to-head goal difference; 4) goal difference; 5) number of goals scored; 6) drawing of lots
(C) Champions; (Q) Qualified for the phase indicated

== Relegation Round ==
The bottom teams from both groups qualified for the Relegation round with the points from the group stage being carried over. The bottom 2 teams in the relegation round will be relegated to First Division.

=== Qualified teams ===
The six teams for the Relegation phase from both the groups are:

Group A	Group B
Kalighat MS	Mohammedan
Railway FC	Calcutta Police Club
Army Red	Southern Samity

=== Standings & Fixtures ===
Pos	Team	Pld	W	D	L	GF	GA	GD	Pts	Qualification	MDS	KMS	RLY	CPC	SOU (Note: Southern Samity gave walkover against Mohammedan and Kalighat MS respectively and subsequently withdrew from competition after no chance of exempting relegation; IFA cancelled all other remaining matches.)	AR (Note: Army Red didn't field their team in Relegation stage, thus IFA gave free 3 points to all other teams of Group A with 3–0 victory.)
1	Mohammedan	14	5	2	7	23	20	+3	17			ABN	6–1	ABN	3–0	
2	Kalighat MS	13	4	3	6	15	16	−1	15				ABN	ABN	3–0	
3	Railway FC	13	1	4	8	5	26	−21	7					0–0	ABN	
4	Calcutta Police Club	13	1	2	10	8	28	−20	5						ABN	
5	Southern Samity (Note: Southern Samity gave walkover against Mohammedan and Kalighat MS respectively and subsequently withdrew from competition after no chance of exempting relegation; IFA cancelled all other remaining matches.) (R)	14	0	2	12	10	34	−24	0 (Note: Southern Samity were deducted 2 points as punishment for not playing match vs Diamond Harbour.)	Relegated to First Division						
6	Army Red (Note: Army Red didn't field their team in Relegation stage, thus IFA gave free 3 points to all other teams of Group A with 3–0 victory.) (R)	0	0	0	0	0	0	0	0	Relegated to First Division						

Source: The Away End
Rules for classification: 1) points; 2) head-to-head points; 3) head-to-head goal difference; 4) goal difference; 5) number of goals scored; 6) drawing of lots
(R) Relegated

== See also ==
- 2025 Bengal Super League
- 2025–26 I-League 3
- 2025–26 Indian State Leagues
- 2025–26 in Indian football
- 2025 IFA Shield
