= JHR Royal City FC =

Football franchise in West Bengal

JHR Royal City
- Full name: JHR Royal City Football Club
- Short name: JRCFC
- Founded: July 2025; 11 months ago
- Ground: Malda DSA Stadium; Berhampore Stadium
- Capacity: 15,000
- Head coach: Saheed Ramon
- League: Bengal Super League
- 2025–26: Bengal Super League, 2nd of 8 (regular season)
Home colours	Away colours

JHR Royal City Football Club is an Indian professional football club based in Malda, West Bengal, that competes in the Bengal Super League (BSL). Established in July 2025, the club is one of the eight franchises of the BSL, a district-based professional league organized by the Indian Football Association (IFA) in partnership with Shrachi Sports.

== History ==
The club was founded to represent the footballing heritage of the Malda region. In July 2025, it was announced as a participant in the inaugural Bengal Super League season. The team is led by Saheed Ramon who formerly coached Mohammedan SC and FC Bengaluru United.

In their debut season, JHR Royal City emerged as a title contender early on. As of late December 2025, they were ranked among the top teams in the league table, having secured key victories against Burdwan Blasters and Kopa Tigers Birbhum.

== Stadium ==
The club plays its home matches at the DSA Stadium in Malda, which has a capacity of 15,000 spectators. The stadium also serves as a hub for football development in North Bengal.

== Players ==
=== First-team squad ===
Note: Flags indicate national team as defined under FIFA eligibility rules; some limited exceptions apply. Players may hold more than one non-FIFA nationality.

No.	Pos.	Nation	Player
—	GK	IND	Priyant Singh
—	GK	IND	Suraj Mallick
1	GK	IND	Sourav Samanta
—	GK	IND	Miraj Ali
33	DF	IND	Amit Tudu
25	DF	IND	Sukhchand Kisku
26	DF	CIV	Adama Coulibaly
—	DF	IND	Karan Chand Hurmo
12	MF	IND	Salman K
8	MF	IND	Sajan Sahani
19	MF	IND	Riswan Shoukath
7	MF	BRA	De Paula
—	MF	IND	Mehedi Hasan

No.	Pos.	Nation	Player
—	MF	IND	Sayan Dutta
9	FW	IND	Robi Hansda
7	FW	BRA	Alê Júnior
—	FW	IND	Md Amil Naim
—	FW	BRA	Tchê Tchê
17	FW	IND	Irfan Sardar
5	DF	IND	Karan Chand Murmu
—		IND	Surajit
15	MF	IND	Md Sumit
—		IND	Samir
—		IND	Tuhin
—		CIV	Kamo Stephane Bayi

== Personnel ==
=== Current technical staff ===
Position	Name
Head coach	(Nigeria) Saheed Ramon

== See also ==
- Football in West Bengal
- Indian Football Association
- Calcutta Football League
