= FC Medinipur =

Football franchise in West Bengal

Medinipur
- Full name: Football Club Medinipur
- Short name: FCM
- Founded: July 2025; 11 months ago
- Ground: Sri Aurobindo Stadium
- Capacity: 10,000
- Head coach: Jayanta Sen
- League: Bengal Super League
- 2025–26: Bengal Super League, 7th of 8
Home colours	Away colours

Football Club Medinipur is an Indian professional football club based in Midnapore, West Bengal, that competes in the Bengal Super League (BSL). Founded in July 2025, the club is one of the eight inaugural franchises of the district-centric professional league organized by the Indian Football Association (IFA) in partnership with Shrachi Sports.

The club represents the Paschim Medinipur region and is coached by former East Bengal and Mohun Bagan midfielder Jayanta Sen.

== History ==
FC Medinipur was established as part of the IFA's initiative to professionalize district-level football in West Bengal. The franchise was officially unveiled on 8 July 2025, during the league's launch at the Great Eastern Hotel in Kolkata.

In their inaugural season, the club faced a challenging start. They played their first match on 16 December 2025 against Howrah Hooghly Warriors FC, losing 1–3. The club secured its first competitive point on 18 December 2025 in a 1–1 draw against Burdwan Blasters, with Somnath Pramanick scoring the equalizer.

== Stadium ==
The club's primary home ground is the Sri Aurobindo Stadium in Midnapore, which has a capacity of 10,000. Due to the league's centralized format, some matches are also played at other BSL venues.

== Players ==
=== First-team squad ===
As of 24 December 2025

Note: Flags indicate national team as defined under FIFA eligibility rules; some limited exceptions apply. Players may hold more than one non-FIFA nationality.

No.	Pos.	Nation	Player
1	GK	IND	Tuhin Dey Talukder
—	GK	IND	Abhisek Balowary
—	GK	IND	Kailash Bera
4	DF	IND	Nongthongbam Japes
19	DF	IND	Bapan Dey
28	DF	GHA	Kwame Oppong
45	DF	IND	Babai Pailan
—	DF	IND	Snehmoy Bhumij
—	DF	IND	Sumrit Dalui
—	DF	IND	Tamas Hembram
44	MF	IND	Rajesh Das

No.	Pos.	Nation	Player
35	MF	IND	Sagun Soren
69	MF	IND	Sudip Kumar Das
20	MF	IND	Somnath Pramanick
—	MF	IND	Anup Singh
—	MF	IND	Somnath Hembram
—	MF	CIV	Sie Ouattara
7	FW	IND	S Johny Kom
37	FW	GHA	Seidu Nuhu Issahak (captain)
—	FW	IND	Mainak Saha
—	FW	IND	Surchandra Singh
—	FW	UGA	Raymond Onyai

== See also ==
- Football in West Bengal
- Indian Football Association
- Calcutta Football League
