= List of things named after Rajendra Prasad =

Rajendra Prasad was an Indian independent activist, lawyer, and statesman who served as the first President of India from 1950 to 1962. Places and institutions named after him include:

== Localities ==
- Rajendra Nagar, Delhi
- Rajendra Nagar, Indore
  - Rajendra Nagar railway station
- Rajendra Nagar, Lucknow
- Rajendra Nagar, Patna
  - Rajendra Nagar Terminal railway station
- Rajendranagar mandal
- Rajendra Place
  - Rajendra Place metro station

== Stadiums ==
- Dr. Rajendra Prasad Stadium
- Rajendra Stadium

== Educational institutions ==
- Dr. Rajendra Prasad Central Agriculture University
- Dr. Rajendra Prasad Government Medical College
- Rajendra College, Chapra
- Rajendra Institute of Medical Sciences
- Rajendra Memorial Research Institute of Medical Sciences

== Others ==
- Rajendra Setu
- Rajendra Smriti Sangrahalaya

== See also ==
- List of things named after presidents of India
