= List of football stadiums in India =

This is a list of football stadiums in India that have been used for major international football matches.

List of international football stadiums in India

== Current stadiums ==
#	Image	Stadium	Capacity	City	State	Home team(s)	Sport(s)
1		Salt Lake Stadium †	85,000	Kolkata (Bidhannagar)	West Bengal	East Bengal, Mohun Bagan, ATK (formerly), Mohammedan	
2		Jawaharlal Nehru Stadium †	60,254	Delhi	Delhi	Punjab FC, SC Delhi	
3		Greenfield International Stadium †	50,000	Thiruvananthapuram	Kerala		
4		EMS Stadium †	50,000	Kozhikode	Kerala	Gokulam Kerala	
5		DY Patil Stadium †	45,300	Navi Mumbai	Maharashtra		
6		Jawarhalal Nehru International Stadium, Kaloor †	41,000	Kochi	Kerala	Kerala Blasters	
7		Birsa Munda Football Stadium	40,000	Ranchi	Jharkhand		
8		Jawaharlal Nehru Stadium †	40,000	Chennai	Tamil Nadu	Chennaiyin FC	
9		Lal Bahadur Shastri Stadium	40,000	Kollam	Kerala		
10		Mangala Stadium	40,000	Mangalore	Karnataka		
11		Kanchenjunga Stadium †	40,000	Siliguri	West Bengal		
12		JRD Tata Sports Complex	40,000	Jamshedpur	Jharkhand	Jamshedpur FC	
13		East Bengal Ground	40,000	Kolkata	West Bengal	Aryan FC	
14		Khuman Lampak Main Stadium †	35,285	Imphal	Manipur	NEROCA FC, TRAU FC, KLASA FC	
15		Ambedkar Stadium †	35,000	Delhi	Delhi	Delhi FC, HOPS FC, Sudeva Delhi	
16		Birsa Munda Athletics Stadium	35,000	Ranchi	Jharkhand		
17		Chhatrapati Shahu Stadium	30,000	Kolhapur	Maharashtra		
18		Guru Nanak Stadium	30,000	Ludhiana	Punjab		
19		Baichung Stadium	30,000	Namchi	Sikkim		
20		Bakhshi Stadium	30,000	Srinagar	Jammu and Kashmir		
21		Malappuram District Sports Complex Stadium	30,000	Malappuram	Kerala	Kerala United FC, Malappuram FC	
22		Paljor Stadium	30,000	Gangtok	Sikkim	United Sikkim	
23		Jawaharlal Nehru Stadium	30,000	Coimbatore	Tamil Nadu		
24		Lal Bahadur Shastri Stadium	30,000	Hyderabad	Telangana		
25		Sree Kanteerava Stadium †	25,810	Bangalore	Karnataka	Bengaluru FC	
26		Bankimanjali Stadium	25,000	Naihati	West Bengal	Diamond Harbour	
27		KD Singh Babu Stadium	25,000	Lucknow	Uttar Pradesh		
28		Guru Gobind Singh Stadium	22,000	Jalandhar	Punjab		
29		Rabindra Sarobar Stadium †	22,000	Kolkata	West Bengal		
30		Indira Gandhi Athletic Stadium †	21,600	Guwahati	Assam	Inter Kashi, NorthEast United	
31		Ekana Football Stadium	20,000	Lucknow	Uttar Pradesh		
32		Kalyani Stadium	20,000	Kalyani	West Bengal		
33		The Arena by Transtadia †	20,000	Ahmedabad	Gujarat		
34		Indira Gandhi Stadium	20,000	Kohima	Nagaland		
35		Mohun Bagan Ground †	20,000	Kolkata	West Bengal		
36		Rajiv Gandhi Stadium	20,000	Aizawl	Mizoram		
37		Silli Stadium	20,000	Silli	Jharkhand		
38		Lal Bahadur Shastri Stadium	20,000	Akola	Maharashtra		
39		Fatorda Stadium †	19,000	Margao	Goa	FC Goa	
40		GMC Balayogi Athletic Stadium †	18,000	Hyderabad	Telangana	Sreenidi Deccan	
41		Jawaharlal Nehru Stadium †	17,000	Shillong	Meghalaya	Rangdajied United FC, Shillong Lajong	
42		Bangalore Football Stadium	15,000	Bangalore	Karnataka	Bengaluru United, SC Bengaluru	
43		Vidyasagar Krirangan	15,000	Barasat	West Bengal		
44		Kalinga Stadium	15,000	Bhubaneswar	Odisha		
45		Calicut Medical College Stadium	15,000	Kozhikode	Kerala		
46		Golden Jubilee Stadium	15,000	Yupia	Arunachal Pradesh		
47		Mulna Stadium	15,000	Balaghat	Madhya Pradesh		
48		Nehru Stadium	15,000	Guwahati	Assam		
49		Rajendra Stadium	15,000	Siwan	Bihar		
50		Sailen Manna Stadium	15,000	Howrah	West Bengal		
51		Sumant Moolgaokar Stadium	15,000	Jamshedpur	Jharkhand		
52		Thrissur Municipal Corporation Stadium	15,000	Thrissur	Kerala		
53		Mohammedan Sporting Ground	14,000	Kolkata	West Bengal		
54		SAI Stadium	12,000	Kokrajhar	Assam		
55		Jorhat Stadium	12,000	Jorhat	Assam		
56		Kishore Bharati Krirangan	12,000	Jadavpur	West Bengal		
57		Shree Shiv Chhatrapati Sports Complex †	11,900	Pune	Maharashtra		
58		Dr. Rajendra Prasad Football Stadium	10,000	Neemuch	Madhya Pradesh		
59		Duler Stadium	10,000	Mapusa	Goa	Dempo SC	
60		Jorethang Ground	10,000	Jorethang	Sikkim		
61		Kottappadi Football Stadium	10,000	Malappuram	Kerala		
62		Mela Ground	10,000	Kalimpong	West Bengal		
63		TRC Turf Ground	10,000	Srinagar	Jammu & Kashmir		
64		KASA Stadium	9,000	Diphu	Assam		
65		Mumbai Football Arena †	7,000	Andheri, Mumbai	Maharashtra	Mumbai City FC	
66		Cooperage Football Stadium	5,000	Mumbai	Maharashtra		
67		Fr. Agnel Stadium	5,000	Navi Mumbai	Maharashtra		
68		Lammual Stadium	5,000	Aizawl	Mizoram		
69		Santipur Municipality Stadium	5,000	Santipur	West Bengal		
70		Tilak Maidan Stadium	5,000	Vasco da Gama	Goa		
71		Nehru Maidan	4,000	Duliajan	Assam		
72		GMC Athletic Stadium	3,000	Bambolim	Goa		
73		Nehru Maidan	2,000	Mangalore	Karnataka		

Note. † denotes stadiums that have hosted international football matches.

== Football-specific stadiums ==
This section lists stadiums in India that are used primarily or exclusively for football, as opposed to multi-purpose venues shared with athletics or cricket. Stadiums are ordered by capacity, largest first.

Legend
Has hosted international football matches (†)
Under construction (‡)
Operational, no international matches hosted

#	Image	Stadium	Capacity	City	State	Home team(s)	Status
1		Mawkhanu Football Stadium ‡	40,000	New Shillong	Meghalaya		Under construction; completion expected late 2028
2		Ambedkar Stadium †	35,000	Delhi	Delhi	Delhi FC, HOPS FC, Sudeva Delhi	Operational
3		Paljor Stadium	30,000	Gangtok	Sikkim	United Sikkim	Operational
4		Bhaichung Stadium	30,000	Namchi	Sikkim		Operational
5		Nehru Stadium ‡	25,000	Guwahati	Assam		Redevelopment into a football stadium
6		Bankimanjali Stadium	25,000	Naihati	West Bengal	Diamond Harbour, North 24 Parganas FC	Operational
7		East Bengal Ground	23,500	Kolkata	West Bengal	East Bengal, Aryan FC	Operational
8		EKA Arena †	20,000	Ahmedabad	Gujarat		Operational
9		Mohun Bagan Ground †	20,000	Kolkata	West Bengal	Mohun Bagan, Calcutta FC	Operational
10		Bangalore Football Stadium	15,000	Bangalore	Karnataka	Bengaluru United, SC Bengaluru	Operational
11		Sailen Manna Stadium	15,000	Howrah	West Bengal		Operational
12		Mohammedan Sporting Ground	14,000	Kolkata	West Bengal		Operational
13		Duler Stadium	10,000	Mapusa	Goa	Dempo SC	Operational
14		TRC Turf Ground	10,000	Srinagar	Jammu & Kashmir		Operational
15		Mumbai Football Arena †	7,000	Mumbai	Maharashtra	Mumbai City FC	Operational
16		Cooperage Football Stadium	5,000	Mumbai	Maharashtra		Operational
17		Chümoukedima Football Stadium	5,000	Chümoukedima	Nagaland	Nagaland United	Operational

Note. † denotes stadiums that have hosted international football matches. ‡ denotes stadiums under construction; capacity is the planned figure.

== 2017 FIFA U-17 World Cup venues ==
The initial shortlist of nine host cities was New Delhi, Pune, Mumbai, Margao, Bengaluru, Kolkata, Kochi, Guwahati, and Navi Mumbai. Following the reception of FIFA's technical report, the AIFF cleared Kochi, Delhi, Navi Mumbai, Guwahati, Margao and Kolkata as the venues for the 2017 FIFA U-17 World Cup. The Jawaharlal Nehru Stadium (Kochi) was the first venue to be announced.

Stadium	Capacity	City
Salt Lake Stadium	85,000	Kolkata
Jawaharlal Nehru Stadium	60,000	Delhi
DY Patil Stadium	45,300	Navi Mumbai
Jawaharlal Nehru Stadium	41,000	Kochi
Indira Gandhi Athletic Stadium	25,000	Guwahati
Jawaharlal Nehru Stadium	19,500	Margao

== 2022 FIFA U-17 Women's World Cup venues ==
Kalinga Stadium in the city of Bhubaneswar got provisional clearance as the first venue for the 2020 FIFA U-17 Women's World Cup. In November 2019, FIFA local organising committee after second inspection of Vivekananda Yuba Bharati Krirangan in Kolkata, Indira Gandhi Athletic Stadium in Guwahati and Kalinga Stadium in Bhubaneswar, expressed their satisfaction with the preparation of infrastructure and the training facilities as the provisional venues for the tournament. On 18 February 2020, all the five venues were finalised and announced together with the official schedule. Ahmedabad, Bhubaneswar, Guwahati and Kolkata will host the group-stage matches, where as the knockout matches will be played in four cities except Guwahati.

Stadium	Capacity	City/State
Kalinga Stadium	15,000	Bhubaneswar, Odisha
DY Patil Stadium	45,300	Navi Mumbai, Maharashtra
Fatorda Stadium	19,500	Margao, Goa

== See also ==
- List of cricket grounds in India
- List of stadiums in India
- List of international cricket grounds in India
- List of golf courses in India
- List of Field hockey venues in India
- Venues of the 2010 Commonwealth Games
- List of association football stadiums by country
- List of sports venues by capacity
- Lists of stadiums
- Football in India
