= Burdwan Blasters =

Football franchise in West Bengal

- Full name: Burdwan Blasters
- Short name: BB
- Founded: 8th July 2025; 14 months ago
- Ground: Bolpur Stadium (temporary)
- Capacity: 15,000
- Head coach: Sandip Nandy
- League: Bengal Super League
- 2025–26: Bengal Super League, 6th of 8
Home colours	Away colours	Third colours

Burdwan Blasters is an Indian professional football club based in Burdwan, West Bengal, that competes in the Bengal Super League (BSL). Founded on 8th July 2025, the club is one of the eight inaugural franchises of West Bengal's first district-centric professional football league, organized by the Indian Football Association (IFA) in collaboration with Shrachi Sports.

== History ==
The club was established to represent the Bardhaman region in the newly formed Bengal Super League. The franchise was unveiled on 8 July 2025 as part of a ten-year agreement between the IFA and Shrachi Sports to professionalize district football. Burdwan Blasters played their first competitive match on 15 December 2025 against Sundarban Bengal Auto FC, narrowly losing 1–2. They secured their first point of the season in a 1–1 draw against FC Medinipur on 18 December.

== Stadium ==
While the club represents Burdwan and was originally slated to play at the Spandan Stadium, their home matches for the inaugural season were hosted at the Bolpur Stadium in Birbhum. The venue, which has a capacity of 15,000, is shared with Kopa Tigers Birbhum.

== Players ==
=== First-team squad ===
As of 24 December 2025

Note: Flags indicate national team as defined under FIFA eligibility rules; some limited exceptions apply. Players may hold more than one non-FIFA nationality.

No.	Pos.	Nation	Player
—	GK	IND	Nabakumar Ghosh
—	GK	IND	Hemanta Ghosh
—	DF	IND	Deep Haldar (captain)
—	DF	UGA	Latif Kiyemba
—	DF	IND	Aveek Orawa
—	DF	IND	Debasish Pramanik
—	DF	IND	Sourav Das
—	DF	IND	Aditya Hati
—	DF	IND	Tanmoy Baidya
—	DF	IND	Khalid Molla
—	MF	IND	Bedashwor Singh Laishram
—	MF	IND	Subhankar Das
—	MF	IND	Gautam Virwani

No.	Pos.	Nation	Player
—	MF	IND	Rajesh Hembram
—	MF	IND	Harsha Parui
—	MF	IND	Aniket Panchal
—	MF	IND	Sourav Sen
—	MF	IND	Jackson
—	FW	IND	Tushar Hembram
—	FW	NGA	Christopher Chizoba
—	FW	IND	Ujjal Howladar
—	FW	IND	Tanmoy Roy
—	FW	GHA	Komenan Issifou
—	FW	SEN	Modou Mbengue

== Personnel ==
=== Current technical staff ===
Position	Name
Head coach	(India) Sandip Nandy
Assistant coach	(India) Gautam Ghosh

== Managerial history ==
=== Head coach's record ===
As of 17 January 2026

Name	Nationality	From	To	P	W	D	L	Win%
Sandip Nandy	India	11 December 2025	Present	12	5	3	4	41.67

== See also ==
- Football in West Bengal
- Indian Football Association
- Calcutta Football League
