= Rajendra Nagar =

Rajendra Nagar or Rajendranagar is the name of several localities and towns in India, most of them named after the country's first president Rajendra Prasad. It may refer to:

- Rajendra Nagar, Delhi, residential neighborhood in Central Delhi, India
  - Major Mohit Sharma Rajendra Nagar metro station, metro station of the Delhi Metro
  - Rajinder Nagar Assembly constituency
- Rajendra Nagar, Indore
  - Rajendra Nagar railway station
- Rajendra Nagar, Lucknow, locality in Lucknow
- Rajendra Nagar, Patna, neighbourhood of Patna, Bihar
  - Rajendra Nagar Terminal railway station, railway station in Rajendra Nagar, Patna which is serviced by these trains
    - Rajendra Nagar-New Delhi Tejas Rajdhani Express
    - Rajendra Nagar Patna–Indore Express
    - Rajendra Nagar-Lokmanya Tilak Terminus Janta Express
    - Rajendranagar Anand Vihar Jan Sadharan Express
    - Rajendranagar Express
  - Rajendra Nagar metro station, of the Patna Metro
- Rajendra Nagar, Raxaul, residential area of Raxaul, Bihar
- Rajendranagar mandal, in Ranga Reddy District, Telangana
  - Rajendranagar Assembly constituency
- A locality in Gwalior, Madhya Pradesh
- A locality in Hyderabad
- A locality in Mysore, Karnataka

== See also ==
- Rajendra (disambiguation)
- Nagar (disambiguation)
