= Rajendra =

Rajendra may refer to:

- Rajendra (name), an Indian male given name (including a list of persons with the name)
  - Rajendra Prasad, first president of India, served from 1950 to 1962
- Rajendra (moth), a moth genus
- Rajendra Nagar (disambiguation), several places in India named after the president
- Rajendra Place, commercial complex in New Delhi, India
  - Rajendra Place metro station, on the Delhi Metro
- Rajendra (radar system), a phased array radar

== See also ==
- Rajinder, alternative form of the Indian male given name
  - Rajinder Kumar (disambiguation)
  - Rajinder Singh (disambiguation)
