= Spandan Stadium =

Stadium in West Bengal

- Interactive map of Spandan Stadium
- Location: Burdwan (Bardhaman), Purba Bardhaman, West Bengal, India
- Coordinates: 23.2487°N 87.8680°E
- Owner: Local municipal authority
- Capacity: c. 8,000–10,000
- Surface: Grass

Construction
- Opened: c. 2010s

Burdwan Spandan Stadium is a sports stadium located in Burdwan, in the Purba Bardhaman of West Bengal, India. The stadium is primarily used for local football matches and district-level sporting events. It has been associated with the Bengal Super League, though it has not regularly hosted professional league matches due to infrastructural limitations.

== History ==
The stadium was developed to promote football and other sports in the Bardhaman region. In 2025, it was initially considered as the home venue for Burdwan Blasters, a club participating in the inaugural season of the Bengal Super League. However, due to concerns regarding pitch conditions and overall readiness, the club's home matches were relocated to Bolpur Stadium in the neighbouring Birbhum.

== Location ==
The stadium is situated in the city of Burdwan (officially Bardhaman), which serves as the administrative headquarters of Purba Bardhaman district in West Bengal.

== Facilities ==
Burdwan Spandan Stadium features a grass playing surface and basic spectator seating. The venue is used mainly for local competitions and training activities. Compared to larger stadiums in West Bengal, the facilities are limited and do not consistently meet the standards required for professional football matches.

== Capacity ==
There is no officially published seating capacity for the stadium. Local estimates suggest it can accommodate approximately 8,000–10,000 spectators, though this figure has not been independently verified by league authorities or government sources.

== Notable events ==
- Hosted matches of the Bhadreswar Gold Cup 2025, a regional football tournament featuring clubs such as Mohammedan Sporting Club.
- Initially scheduled to host home matches of Burdwan Blasters in the Bengal Super League, which were later shifted to Bolpur due to pitch-related issues.

== Challenges ==
Local media have reported concerns regarding the stadium’s infrastructure, particularly the playing surface, which was deemed unfit for professional league matches during the 2025–26 Bengal Super League season. Efforts to improve the facility have been discussed by local authorities.

== See also ==
- Burdwan Blasters
- Bengal Super League
