= Bengal Super League =

Franchise-based football league in West Bengal, India

Bengal Super League বেঙ্গল সুপার লিগ
- Organising body: Indian Football Association; Shrachi Sports
- Founded: 2025
- First season: 2025–26
- Country: India
- Number of clubs: 8
- Current champions: Howrah Hooghly Warriors (1st title)
- Most championships: Howrah Hooghly Warriors (1 title)
- Broadcaster(s): Zee BanglaSonar; ZEE5
- Website: bengalsuperleague.com
- Current: 2025–26 Bengal Super League

The Bengal Super League (BSL) is a professional football league in the Indian state of West Bengal, organized by the Indian Football Association. Established in July 2025, the league features district-based franchise teams and is aimed at developing grassroots football, creating a structured pathway for district talents, professionalizing the sport in Bengal, establishing a feeder system for national leagues, and boosting infrastructure, fan engagement, and commercial investment in rural ecosystems.

== History ==
The league was officially launched on 8 July 2025 at the Great Eastern Hotel, by the Indian Football Association in association with sports management company Shrachi Sports, under a ten-year agreement between the two organizations. In October 2025, the BSL announced Lothar Matthäus as the league ambassador.

== Format ==
The BSL follows a model similar to the ISL. Eight teams representing different districts were announced for the inaugural season. Each team is allowed a 25-member squad. The competition features a total of 61 matches, including double round-robin fixtures, semifinals, and a final. Each team builds its squad through a player draft system. Teams are required to field at least seven state-grown players, including U-19 footballers, in their playing XI. Only two foreign players and two national-level outstation players are permitted in each team.

== Teams ==
Locations of the BSL teams

Team	City
Burdwan Blasters	Bardhaman
Howrah Hooghly Warriors	Howrah
JHR Royal City	Malda
Kopa Tigers Birbhum	Bolpur
Medinipur	Midnapore
North 24 Parganas	Naihati
North Bengal United	Siliguri
Sundarban Bengal Auto	Canning

== Stadiums ==
Burdwan Blasters	Howrah Hooghly Warriors	JHR Royal City		Kopa Tigers Birbhum
Spandan Stadium	Sailen Manna Stadium	DSA Stadium	Berhampore Stadium	Bolpur Stadium
Capacity: 4,000	Capacity: 15,000	Capacity: 15,000	Capacity: 5,000	Capacity: 15,000
Medinipur	North 24 Parganas	North Bengal United	Kopa Tigers Birbhum, Howrah Hooghly Warriors	Sundarban Bengal Auto
Sri Aurobindo Stadium	Bankimanjali Stadium	Kanchenjunga Stadium	Kalyani Stadium	Canning Sports Complex
Capacity: 10,000	Capacity: 25,000	Capacity: 40,000	Capacity: 20,000	Capacity: 12,000

== Broadcasting ==
The league announced broadcast deal with Zee, including digital streaming on ZEE5.

== Results ==
Season	Champions	Runners-up	Teams
2025–26	Howrah Hooghly Warriors	JHR Royal City	8

== See also ==
- Football in West Bengal
- Calcutta Football League
- Premier League Soccer
