= Howrah Hooghly Warriors FC =

Football franchise in West Bengal

Howrah Hooghly Warriors
- Full name: Howrah Hooghly Warriors Football Club
- Nickname: The Warriors
- Short name: HHWFC
- Founded: July 2025; 15 months ago
- Ground: Sailen Manna Stadium
- Capacity: 15,000
- Owner: Nikhil Shaw
- Head coach: José Barreto
- League: Bengal Super League
- 2025–26: Champions
Home colours	Away colours

Howrah Hooghly Warriors Football Club is an Indian professional football club representing the districts of Howrah and Hooghly in West Bengal. Founded in July 2025, the club competes in the Bengal Super League (BSL), the state's premier district-based franchise football competition organized by the Indian Football Association (IFA) in partnership with Shrachi Sports.

The club is coached by Mohun Bagan legend and record goalscorer José Barreto, marking his return to Bengal football.

== History ==
Howrah-Hooghly Warriors was established as one of the eight founding franchises of the Bengal Super League in July 2025. Under the guidance of Jose Ramirez Barreto, the Warriors built a squad combining experienced professional campaigners with young prospects from the twin districts. The team made its competitive debut in December 2025.

== Stadium ==
The club's primary home ground is the Sailen Manna Stadium (also known as Howrah Municipal Stadium) in Howrah, which has a capacity of 15,000. During the 2025–26 season, the club also utilized the Kalyani Stadium for certain home fixtures as part of the league's centralized scheduling.

== Players ==
=== First-team squad ===
As of 24 December 2025

Note: Flags indicate national team as defined under FIFA eligibility rules; some limited exceptions apply. Players may hold more than one non-FIFA nationality.

No.	Pos.	Nation	Player
1	GK	IND	Avilash Paul (captain)
—	GK	IND	Ranjan Soren
37	DF	IND	Shallum Pires
24	DF	IND	Anish Mazumder
—	DF	IND	Soumik Koley
—	DF	IND	Faiz Khan
4	DF	IND	Suman Roy
—	DF	IND	Baban Pakray
99	DF	IND	Swarup Das
—	DF	IND	Aman Yadav
—	DF	IND	Rajdip Das
—	DF	SEN	Seila Toure
—	MF	IND	Sk Sahil

No.	Pos.	Nation	Player
44	MF	IND	Koustav Dutta
15	MF	IND	Adarsh Lama Tamang
—	MF	IND	Dipesh Murmu
21	MF	IND	Deep Gain
—	MF	IND	Arit
—	MF	CIV	William Sessegnon
10	FW	BRA	Paulo Cézar
—	FW	IND	Azharuddin Mallick
14	FW	IND	Lourembam David Singh
10	FW	IND	Sk Jiyabul Hossain
—	FW	IND	Sahil Harijan
—	FW	IND	Akash Das

== Personnel ==
=== Current technical staff ===
Position	Name
Head coach	(Brazil) José Barreto
Assistant coach	(India) Sanjay Palandar
Assistant coach	(India) Suman Dutta
Goalkeeping coach	(India) Sangram Mukherjee

== See also ==
- Football in West Bengal
- Indian Football Association
- Calcutta Football League
