= Avilash Paul =

Indian footballer (born 1994)

Personal information
- Full name: Avilash Paul
- Date of birth: 26 December 1994 (age 31)
- Place of birth: West Bengal, India
- Height: 1.85 m (6 ft 1 in)
- Position: Goalkeeper

Team information
- Current team: United Kolkata
- Number: 1

Youth career
- 2011–2014: Pune FC

Senior career*
Years	Team	Apps	(Gls)
2014–2015	Pune FC	0	(0)
2015–2016	→ Gangtok Himalayan SC (loan)	13	(0)
2016–2017	East Bengal FC	0	(0)
2017	→ Kenkre FC (Loan)	9	(0)
2017–2018	Aizawl	21	(0)
2018–2020	ATK	3	(0)
2020–2023	Mohun Bagan SG		
2023–2024	Gokulam Kerala	13	(0)
2025–2026	Howrah Hooghly Warriors		
- * Club domestic league appearances and goals

Avilash Paul (born 26 December 1994) is an Indian professional footballer who plays as a goalkeeper.

== Career ==
Paul began his career in Pune FC's Academy. A year later, he joined Second Division League side Gangtok Himalayan SC before joining Kolkata giants East Bengal. He then joined Kenkre FC on Loan from East Bengal to play in the I-League Second Division in 2017 final round.

=== Aizawl FC ===
At the start of the 2017–2018 season he was picked up by Aizawl FC after Albino had left to join Delhi Dynamos, He Proved out to be an Outstanding Goalkeeper for the team appearing 21 times across I-League, AFC Champions League, AFC Cup in 2017–18.

=== ATK ===
After having a successful season with Aizawl FC he joined ATK for season 2018–19 and become 3rd choice keeper behind Arindam and Debjit.
