= Rajinder Kumar =

Rajinder Kumar may refer to:

- Rajinder Kumar (footballer) (born 1993), Indian footballer
- Rajinder Kumar (chemical engineer) (born 1934), Indian chemical engineer
- Rajinder Kumar Dhanger (born 1961), Indian judoka
