= Sandip Nandy =

Indian footballer

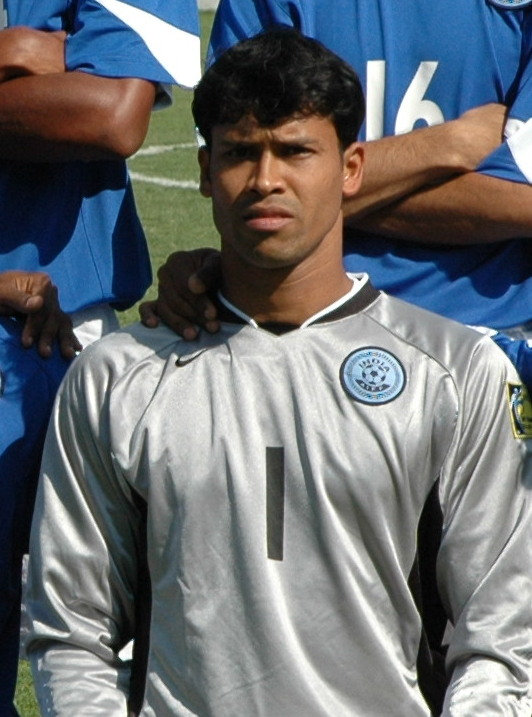
- Nandy with India in 2007

Personal information
- Full name: Sandip Nandy
- Date of birth: 15 January 1975 (age 51)
- Place of birth: Bardhaman, West Bengal, India
- Height: 1.77 m (5 ft 10 in)
- Position: Goalkeeper

Senior career*
| Years | Team | Apps | (Gls) |
| 1999–2001 | Mohun Bagan | 38 | (0) |
| 2001–2002 | Tollygunge Agragami | 34 | (0) |
| 2002–2004 | East Bengal | 64 | (0) |
| 2004–2009 | Mahindra United | 146 | (0) |
| 2009–2010 | Chirag United | 32 | (0) |
| 2010–2012 | East Bengal | 94 | (0) |
| 2012–2013 | Churchill Brothers | 34 | (0) |
| 2013–2014 | Mohun Bagan | 26 | (0) |
| 2014–2016 | Kerala Blasters | 24 | (0) |
| 2016–2017 | Mumbai | 18 | (0) |
| 2017–2018 | Kerala Blasters | 16 | (0) |
| 2018–2019 | Southern Samity | 32 | (0) |

International career^{‡}
| 2004–2006 | India U23 | 12 | (0) |
| 2004–2013 | India | 54 | (0) |

Managerial career
- 2019–2020: NorthEast United (goalkeeping coach)
- 2020–2022: Mohammedan (goalkeeping coach)
- 2022–2023: Gokulam Kerala (goalkeeping coach)
- 2023–2024: India U20 (goalkeeping coach)
- 2024–2025: East Bengal (goalkeeping coach)
- 2025–2026: India U23 (goalkeeping coach)
- 2025–: Burdwan Blasters
- 2026–: India U20 (goalkeeping coach)
- 2026–: Gokulam Kerala (goalkeeping coach)
- * Club domestic league appearances and goals as of 19:30, 8 January 2018 (UTC) ‡ National team caps and goals as of 2 January 2017

Sandip Nandy (born 15 January 1975) is an Indian football manager and former player who is the goalkeeping coach of the Indian Football League club Gokulam Kerala.

He played as a goalkeeper. He has served as the goalkeeping coach of India national under-23 football team and currently is the goalkeeping coach of India national under-20 football team.

Nandy also appeared with West Bengal team in the 46th edition (2009–10 season) of Santosh Trophy after being drafted by Spanish manager Vicente Maroto. In the final on 8 August 2010, they clinched the title edging past Punjab 2–1 at the Vivekananda Yuba Bharati Krirangan. Sandip gained popularity due to his brief mention in the Spanish comedy series La que se avecina season 4 episode 53.

== Statistics ==
=== International ===
Statistics accurate as of 27 March 2013.

| National team | Year | Apps |
|---|---|---|
| India | 2004 | 2 |
| India | 2005 | 4 |
| India | 2006 | 7 |
| India | 2007 | 1 |
| India | 2013 | 2 |
| India | Total | 16 |

== Honours ==
India

- SAFF Championship: 2005; runner-up: 2013

East Bengal

- ASEAN Club Championship: 2003
