= Rajendra Stadium =

Stadium in Katihar, Bihar, India

- District Stadium
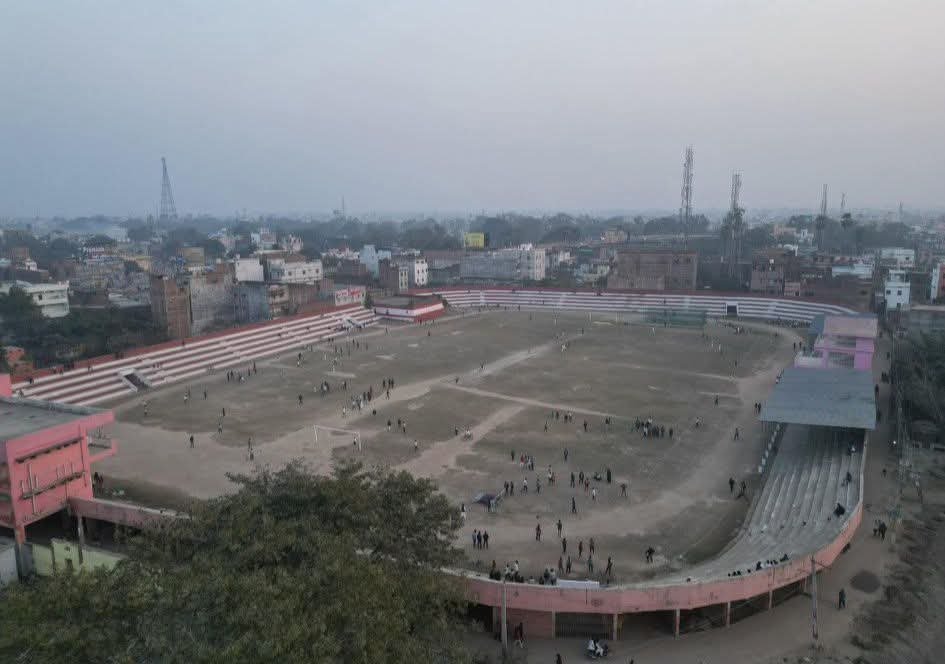
- Full name: Rajendra Stadium
- Location: Shanti Nagar, Siwan, Bihar, India
- Owner: Siwan Nagar Nigam
- Operator: Siwan Nagar Nigam
- Capacity: 15,000
- Surface: Grass

Construction
- Opened: 2024

The Rajendra Stadium is a multi-purpose stadium located in Siwan, Bihar. The stadium has a capacity of 15,000 spectators. The stadium has been a venue for football tournaments, fairs and exhibitions. It is used mostly for association football matches and the stadium is named after the first President of India Dr. Rajendra Prasad. Tenants RK Steel FC sometimes drew crowds above 10,000 for their association football matches at the Rajendra Stadium.

== See also ==
- Bihar Football Association
- List of football stadiums in India
- List of association football stadiums by country
