= Rajendra Nagar, Lucknow =

Rajendra Nagar
- Neighbourhood of Lucknow
- Interactive map of Rajendra Nagar
- Coordinates: 26°50′41″N 80°55′12″E
- Country: India
- State: Uttar Pradesh
- District: Lucknow
- Named for: Rajendra Prasad

Government
  - Body: Lucknow Development Authority

Languages
  - Official: Hindi
- Time zone: UTC+5:30 (IST)
- PIN Code: 226004
- Vehicle registration: UP-32
- Telephone code: 91-522
- Civic agency: Lucknow Municipal Corporation
- 11KM from Airport and 2KM from Railway Station

Rajendra Nagar is a residential colony in Lucknow, India. It is bordered by Moti Nagar on the south, Tilak Nagar on the west, and Dugawan and Raniganj on the east.

== Etymology ==
It is named after the first President of India, Shri (Dr) Rajendra Prasad. The area is located on the same place where the famous Lucknow Session of Congress was held in 1916. After which the plotting of the space was done as a residential place. The neighbouring areas are Moti Nagar, Nehru Nagar, etc all named after Freedom Fighters of India.

== Educational institutions ==
- Navyug Kanya Vidyalaya
- Navyuga Degree College
- Pioneer Montessori School
- City Montessori School
