= Kopa Tigers Birbhum =

Football franchise in West Bengal

- Full name: Kopa Tigers Birbhum
- Nickname: The Tigers
- Short name: KTB
- Founded: July 2025; 7 months ago
- Ground: Bolpur Stadium
- Capacity: 15,000
- Owner: Abhijit Roy
- Head coach: Georgi Raev Kostadinov
- League: Bengal Super League
- 2025–26: Bengal Super League, 8th of 8
Home colours	Away colours

Kopa Tigers Birbhum is an Indian professional football club based in Birbhum, West Bengal, that competes in the Bengal Super League (BSL). Founded in July 2025, the club represents the "Ranga Matir Desh" (land of red soil) and is one of the eight franchises of the BSL, organized by the Indian Football Association (IFA) and Shrachi Sports.

The club is owned by entrepreneur Abhijit Roy and coached by Bulgarian Georgi Raev Kostadinov.

== History ==
Kopa Tigers Birbhum's identity is deeply rooted in local heritage, taking its name from the Kopai River that flows through Bolpur. In their inaugural campaign, the Tigers made headlines by signing Tajikistan international and I-League winner Komron Tursunov as their marquee player. The team played its first competitive match on 15 December 2025 against North 24 Parganas FC at Naihati Stadium.

== Stadium ==
The club plays its home matches at the Bolpur Stadium, which has a capacity of 15,000. For the inaugural season, the stadium also temporarily served as the home ground for Burdwan Blasters.

== Players ==
=== First-team squad ===
As of 24 December 2025

Note: Flags indicate national team as defined under FIFA eligibility rules; some limited exceptions apply. Players may hold more than one non-FIFA nationality.

No.	Pos.	Nation	Player
—	GK	IND	Iprotip Das
—	GK	IND	Aftab Alam
21	GK	IND	Mahanta Mandal
—	GK	IND	Akib Sheikh
2	DF	IND	Akash Mondal
—	DF	IND	Pritam Kundu
99	DF	IND	Shubhankar Adhikary
25	DF	IND	Sourish Lodh Chowdhury
—	DF	IND	Gourab Das
38	DF	IND	Jagai Konar
—	DF	IND	Malsawma

No.	Pos.	Nation	Player
7	MF	IND	SK Rintu
—	MF	IND	Marshal Hembram
—	MF	IND	Lalruatsanga
13	MF	IND	Tapan Haldar
—	MF	IND	Jayanta Das
—	MF	IND	Samir Shikdar
—	MF	IND	Diganta Mandal
10	FW	TJK	Komron Tursunov (captain)
19	FW	IND	Abhishek Roy
11	FW	IND	Manav Mullick
34	MF	IND	SK Golap

== Personnel ==
=== Current technical staff ===
Position	Name
Head coach	(Bulgaria) Georgi Raev Kostadinov
Goalkeeper coach	(India) Sanju Sarkar
Physio	(India) Aditya Kumar

== See also ==
- Football in West Bengal
- Indian Football Association
- Calcutta Football League
