= Dugawan =

- Neighbourhood of Lucknow
- Interactive map of Dugawan
- Coordinates: 26°50′41″N 80°55′12″E
- Country: India
- State: Uttar Pradesh
- District: Lucknow
- Settled: 19th century
- Named after: Acronym for 'Two(Do) Villages(Gaon)', hence, 'Dugawan'

Government
  - Body: Lucknow Development Authority

Languages
  - Official: Hindi, English, Urdu
- Time zone: UTC+5:30 (IST)
- PIN Code: 226018
- Vehicle registration: UP-32
- Telephone code: 91-522
- Civic agency: Lucknow Municipal Corporation
- 11KM from Airport and 2KM from Railway Station

Dugawan (Hindi: दुगावां, Urdu: دگاواں), is a neighbourhood of Lucknow, located north of the Charbagh Railway Station. Its name is a blend of 'Do Gaon', meaning 'Two Villages'.

It was established in the 19th century by the Sheikhs. The Sheikhs were given this piece of land (seven hundred acres) to settle in. This land comprised two villages.

== Localities ==
- Hata -e- Sheikhan
