= Premier League Soccer (India) =

- Founded: 2011
- Folded: 2013
- Country: India
- Number of clubs: 6

Premier League Soccer (PLS) was an Indian football league competition established on 1 January 2012, which was to take place in the state of West Bengal. The league was expected to begin its first season on 25 February 2012, with the aim to increase interest in football in West Bengal. It was modelled on the lines of the United States' Major League Soccer and the Indian Premier League.

== Structure ==
The league was organised by Celebrity Management Group, who had signed a 30-year deal with the Indian Football Association, the apex body of football in West Bengal. There would have been six teams in the inaugural 2012 season; they were to have been owned by franchises, who would have to bid for the team for 10 years and pay a yearly franchisee fee. They were to be based in Kolkata, and five regional centres: Howrah, Barasat, Durgapur and Siliguri. Each team was to play every other team twice (once at home and once away). Three points were to have been awarded for a win, one for a draw and zero for a loss. At the end of the season a table of the final League standings was to have been determined, based on the following criteria in this order: points obtained, goal difference, and goals scored. After the regular season the teams would have played in a play-off style tournament in which there would have been semi-finals and a final. The tournament would have been played across seven weeks, from 24 March to 6 May 2012.

== Media coverage ==
As of February 2012, there had been no television deal for the 2012 PLS season announced.

== Clubs and stadiums ==
A list of clubs for the 2012 season was to have been decided after an auction on 10 to 12 February 2011.

Club	Price	Owner	Icon players	Overseas players	Asian origin players	Coach
Barasat Euro Musketeers	Rs 25.15 crore	Uro Infra Reality India	Hernán Crespo $840,000	Christian Lara $200,000; Joaquin Botero $180,000	Park Byoung-Gyu $90,000	Teitur Thordarson $210,000
Bengal Tuskers	Rs 18 crore	Aajay Consultants	Fabio Cannavaro $830,000	Santino Quaranta $180,000; Limberg Gutierrez $180,000;	Hwang Gyu-Hwan $90,000	Marco Etcheverry $200,000
Kolkata Camelians	Rs 11.5 crore	Camelia Group	Robbie Fowler	Robert Egbeta $350,000; Daniel Varela $120,000	Park Ji-Seung $140,000	Peter Reid $200,000
Manchester Howrah	Rs 9 crore	Syncsys Infotech	Robert Pires $715,000	Jose Gabriel Rios $180,000, Diego Madrigal $120,000	Byun Yoon-Chul $115,000	Fernando Couto $240,000
Durgapur Vox Champions	Rs 7.6 crore	Tulip Infonet	Jay Jay Okocha $550,000	José Carlos Castillo $80,000; Alonso Solís $200,000	Kim Bong-Kyeom $150,000	Samson Siasia $210,000
Haldia Heroes	base tag of Rs 70 lakh	Grey Mind Communications	Juan Pablo Sorín	-	-	John Barnes

== Postponement and cancellation ==
In the last week of February 2012, Utpal Ganguli, the secretary of the Indian Football Association, announced that the league had been postponed. He did not reveal the new dates or the causes of postponement. It is believed that financial hurdles and lack of venues were the major reasons.

In January 2013, the Indian Football Association announced that it had withdrawn support for the venture, citing financial problems, the lack of suitable venues, and the unavailability of overseas players in the period the competition was to have been played.

== See also ==
- Calcutta Football League
- Bengal Super League
