= Robi Hansda =

Indian football player

Personal information
- Full name: Robi Hansda
- Date of birth: 9 June 1999 (age 27)
- Place of birth: Mongalkote, India
- Position: Forward

Team information
- Current team: JHR Royal City
- Number: 9

Youth career
- Mohan Bagan Academy Fortapur
- Nongthymmai Sport & Cultural Club
- Cossipore Saraswati Club

Senior career*
Years	Team	Apps	(Gls)
2021–	West Bengal State Team	47	(19)
–2022	ASOS	20	(7)
2022–2025	Calcutta Customs Club	17	(4)
2025	→ Mohammedan SC	14	(2)
2025–	JHR Royal City	7	(1)
- * Club domestic league appearances and goals as of 21:53, 8 January 2025 (IST)

Robi Hansda (Bengali: রবি হাঁসদা; born 9 June 1999) is an Indian professional footballer who plays as a forward. He currently plays for JHR Royal City. He gained national prominence during the 2024–25 Santosh Trophy, where he emerged as the tournament's top scorer, leading West Bengal to victory.

== Club career ==
Hansda began his career with Cossipore Saraswati Club before moving to Rainbow Athletic Club. He later joined Calcutta Customs Club, signing a two-year contract.

In the 2024–25 Santosh Trophy, Hansda became a key player for the West Bengal team, scoring a record-breaking 12 goals in the tournament, breaking a longstanding record and earning the Player of the Championship award.

In the winter transfer session of the AIFF, Hansda was picked by Indian Super League club Mohammedan SC on loan, while other teams like East Bengal also were on the lookout for him.

== Personal life ==
From a young age, Hansda displayed a passion for football, with his parents encouraging him despite their modest circumstances. In 2024 his father died unexpectedly, creating a major personal and emotional setback. This loss left Hansda contemplating quitting football to focus on supporting his family. He dedicated his success to his father.

== Honours ==
=== State ===
West Bengal

- Santosh Trophy: 2024–25
- National Games Gold medal: 2022
