= Uttarbanga Cup =

Association football tournament in India

- Organiser(s): Indian Football Association (West Bengal)
- Founded: 2021; 5 years ago
- Region: India (West Bengal)
- Teams: 20
- Current champions: Murshidabad Police (1st title)

The Uttarbanga Cup is an Indian Football Association tournament organised in North Bengal Region to scout talent from different parts of West Bengal.

== Formation ==
This tournament started on 27 February 2021. Uttarbanga Cup is an initiative to develop football and scout young, talented football players in North Bengal region.

== Results ==
Year	Winners	Score	Runners-up	Ref
2021	Murshidabad Police FC	3–2	Georgian FC, Kalimpong	
