= Biswajit Bhattacharya =

Indian footballer and manager

Personal information
- Full name: Biswajit Bhattacharya
- Date of birth: 1964 (age 61–62)
- Place of birth: Calcutta, West Bengal, India
- Position: Forward

Senior career*
Years	Team	Apps	(Gls)
1984-88	East Bengal Club		(49)

International career
- India

Managerial career
- 2010: Mohun Bagan
- 2011–2012: Chirag United Club Kerala
- 2015–2016: East Bengal
- 2017–2018: Mohammedan
- 2018–2019: Paro
- 2021–2022: Southern Samity
- 2022: Calcutta Customs
- 2022–: West Bengal
- 2025–: North Bengal United
- * Club domestic league appearances and goals

Biswajit Bhattacharya is a retired Indian football manager and former footballer who serves as the head coach of the Bengal Super League club North Bengal United. He also managed the Calcutta Football League club Calcutta Customs and also serves as the head coach of the West Bengal football team.

== Playing career ==
=== East Bengal ===
Bhattacharya played as a striker in the India national football team and played for both the Calcutta Football League clubs East Bengal and Mohun Bagan. In 1985, he won Federation Cup with East Bengal and went on to play at the 1985–86 Asian Club Championship in Saudi Arabia. Managed by P. K. Banerjee, East Bengal was part of Central Asia Zone, and the tournament was named "Coca-Cola Cup" where they defeated multiple teams to win it. In the opener against New Road Team of Nepal, they earned a massive 7–0 win, where Bhattacharya netted four goals. They also defeated Dhaka Abahani 1–0, thrashed Club Valencia of Maldives 9–0 (the biggest margin of victory by an Indian team over any foreign opponents).

=== India ===
He represented India at the 1984 AFC Asian Cup in Singapore. He scored a goal against Poland in 1984 Nehru Cup. That was India's only goal in the tournament. After a bike accident, Bhattacharya left his playing career and entered into coaching.

== Managerial career ==
=== Chirag Kerala ===
In February 2012, after sacking Sri Lankan manager Pakir Ali, Chirag United Kerala roped in Bhattacharya as technical director. The club finished in twelfth position on league table of 2011–12 season, and relegated. He left the club, and soon they got dissolved.

=== East Bengal ===
He later managed East Bengal in the 2015–16 season, and helped them winning prestigious Calcutta Football League.

=== Mohammedan ===
In 2017–18, he managed Mohammedan Sporting. With Mohammedan, he won Bordoloi Trophy, defeating Oil India Limited by 3–1 margin in final.

=== Peerless ===
In 2018, he was appointed head coach of Peerless in the Calcutta Football League.

=== Paro (Bhutan) ===
In 2019, he moved abroad and managed Bhutan Premier League club Paro. In that year, they won league title.

=== Southern Samity ===
On 1 July 2021, Southern Samity appointed Bhattacharya as their new head coach. The club began their 2021 CFL Premier Division campaign with a 3–0 defeat against Mohammedan Sporting, and Bhattacharya was succeeded by Nigerian-Indian manager Saheed Ramon in September. He later managed century-old club Calcutta Customs.

=== West Bengal ===
In 2022, Bhattacharya took charge of West Bengal and helped the team clinching gold at the 36th National Games of India, defeating Kerala 5–0 in final in Ahmedabad. He later guided the team in 2022–23 Santosh Trophy, but they failed to break into the semi-finals hosted in Saudi Arabia.

== Honours ==
=== Player ===
East Bengal

- Federation Cup: 1984–85
- Coca Cola Cup: 1985

Bengal

- Santosh Trophy: 1981-82, 1986-87

=== Manager ===
East Bengal

- Calcutta Football League: 2015–16

Mohammedan Sporting

- Bordoloi Trophy: 2018
- Bodoland Martyrs Gold Cup: 2018
- Darjeeling Gold Cup runner-up: 2018

Paro

- Bhutan Premier League: 2019
- Jigme Dorji Wangchuk Memorial Gold Cup: 2019

West Bengal

- National Games Gold medal: 2022

== See also ==
- List of East Bengal Club coaches
- List of India national football team captains
