= Bankimanjali Stadium =

Football stadium in Naihati, West Bengal

- বঙ্কিমাঞ্জলী স্টেডিয়াম
- Naihati Stadium নৈহাটি স্টেডিয়াম
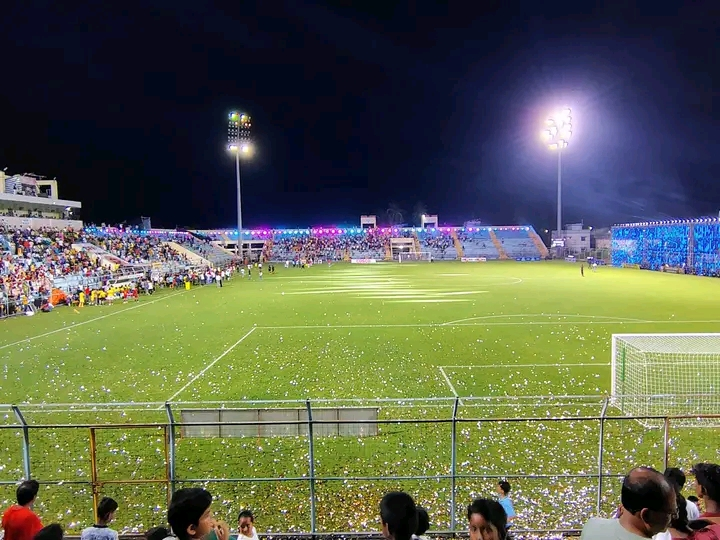
- Interactive map of Bankimanjali Stadium
- Location: Naihati, West Bengal
- Coordinates: 22.89304°N 88.42594°E
- Owner: Naihati Municipality
- Operator: Indian Football Association
- Capacity: 25,000
- Surface: Bermuda grass

Construction
- Opened: 2019; 7 years ago

Tenants
- Diamond Harbour FC; Bengal Super League

Bankimanjali Stadium, commonly known as Naihati Stadium, is a football stadium located in a municipality of Naihati in North 24 Parganas district in the Indian state of West Bengal. Named after Bankim Chandra Chatterjee, the stadium is owned by Naihati Municipality and has a capacity of 25,000 spectators. The stadium has hosted games of the Calcutta Football League, the IFA Shield, the I-League, and the Durand Cup. The stadium is the official ground of the friendly club tournament Naihati Gold Cup.

== See also ==
- List of football stadiums in India
