= Sailen Manna Stadium =

Stadium in Howrah, West Bengal

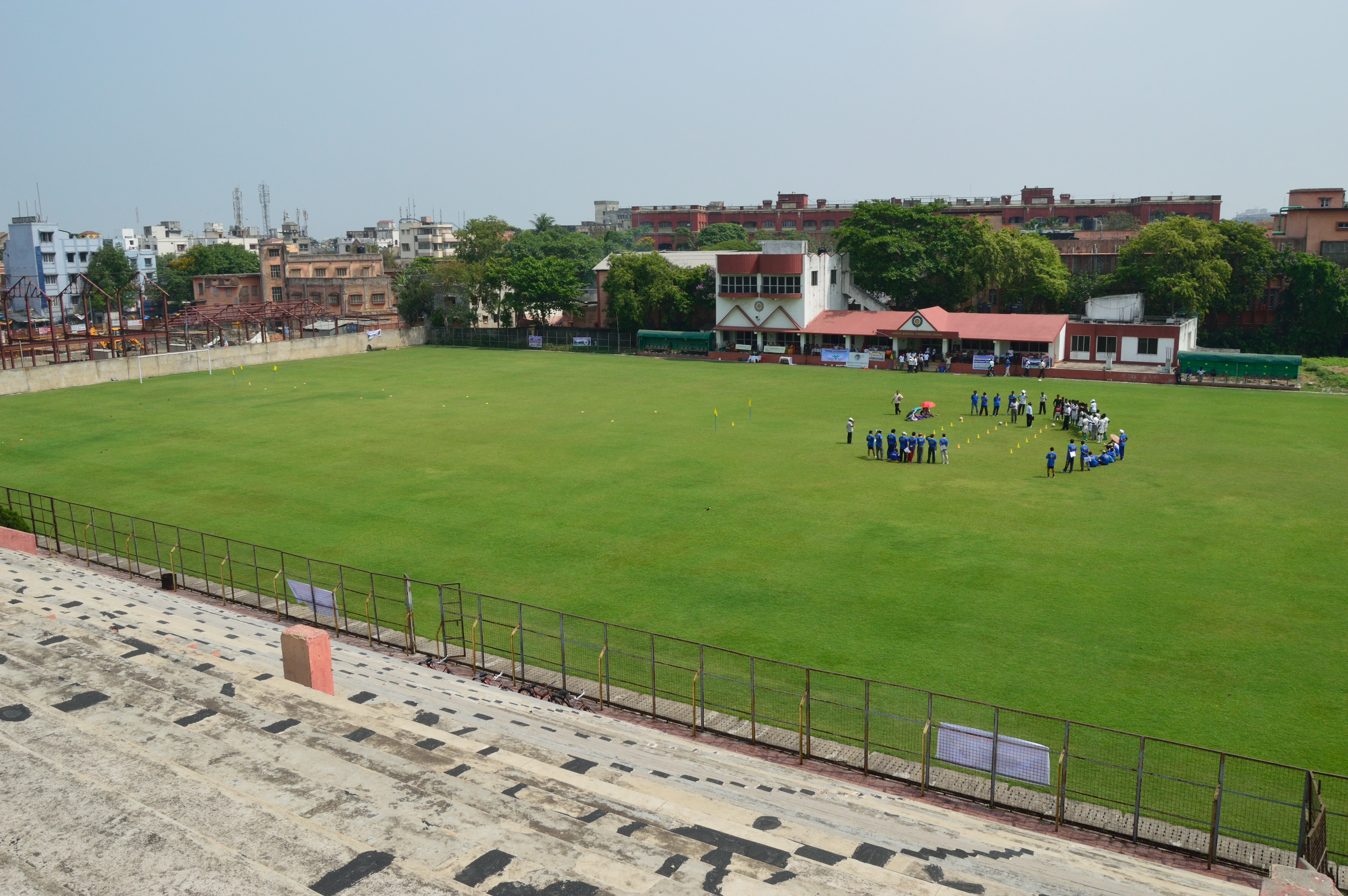
- Howrah Municipal Corporation Stadium
- Interactive map of Sailen Manna Stadium
- Location: Howrah Maidan, Howrah
- Owner: Howrah Municipal Corporation
- Capacity: 15,000
- Surface: Grass
- Public transit: Howrah railway station, Howrah Maidan metro station Green Line

Tenant
- Various

Sailen Manna Stadium (also known as Howrah Municipal Corporation Stadium) is a multi-use stadium in Howrah, West Bengal, India. Mainly used for football, it has hosted some matches during the 2006 AFC Youth Championship. The stadium can host 15,000 spectators. Howrah Rugby Crows and several football clubs (most notably Howrah Hooghly Warriors) use the venue for home games.

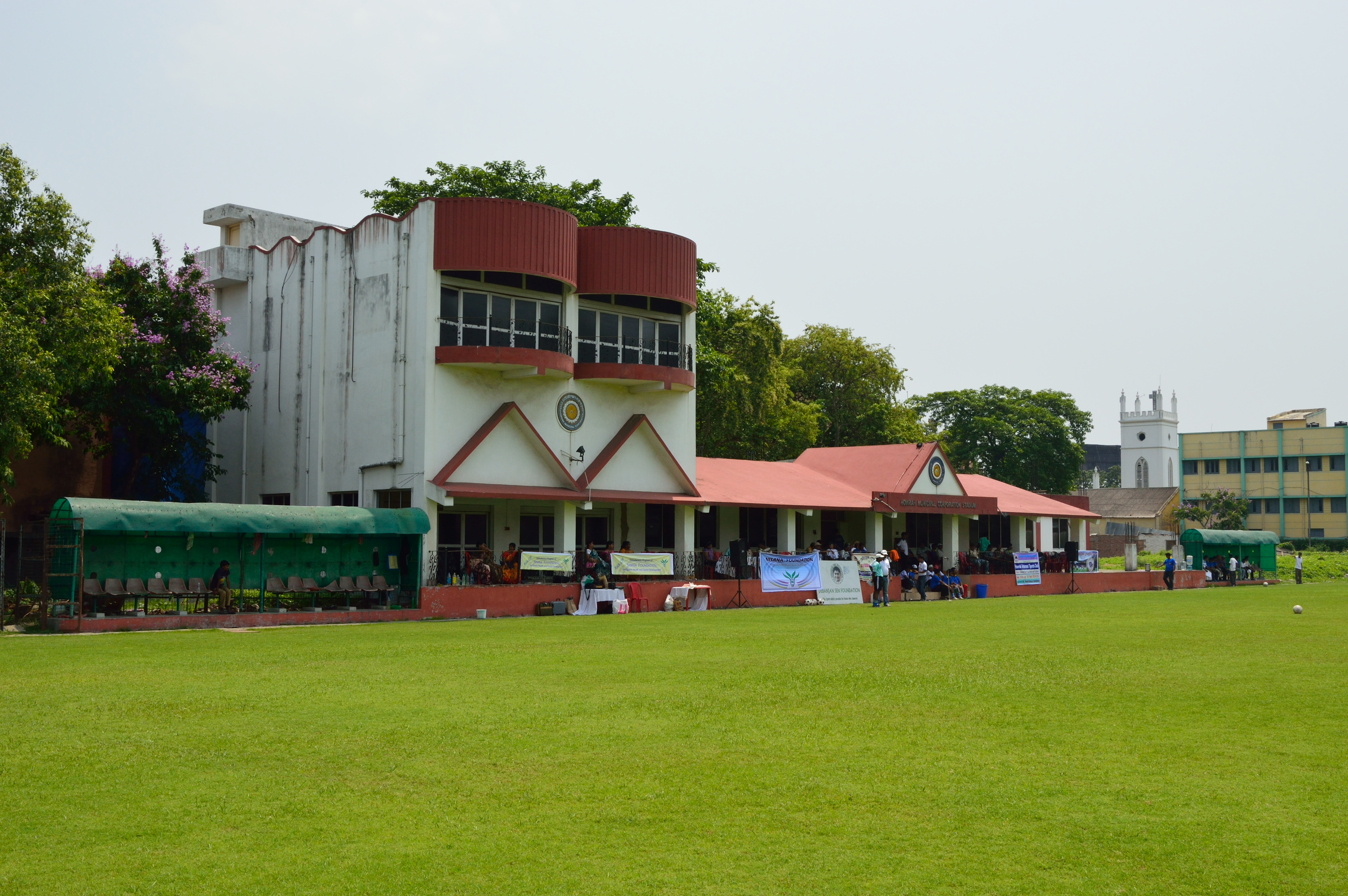
A view of the pavilion
