= Football in West Bengal =

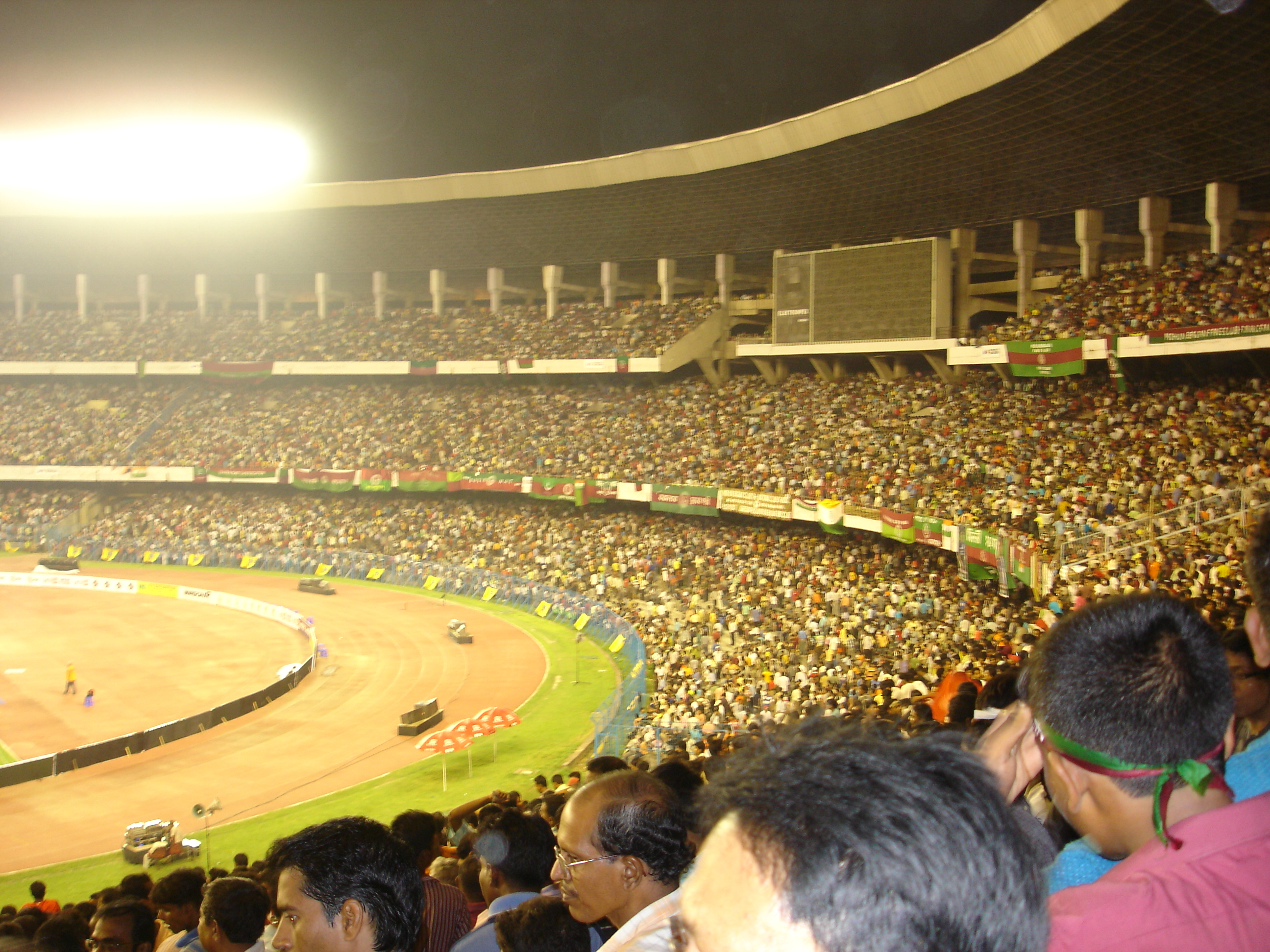
- Indian crowd during the match between FC Bayern Munich and Mohun Bagan, May 27, 2008
- Governing body: Indian Football Association (IFA) (formed in 1893)

Audience records
- Single match: 131,781 (1997 Federation Cup Semifinal: East Bengal F.C. VS Mohun Bagan A.C. at Salt Lake Stadium, 1997)

Association football is one of the two most-popular sports in West Bengal, the other being cricket. East Bengal, Mohun Bagan and Mohammedan are the heart of West Bengal football. The rivalry between Mohun Bagan and East Bengal, originating from the Calcutta Football League as the Kolkata derby, is one of the fiercest in the world and considered among the flagship events in the Indian footballing calendar. West Bengal is known to be the Mecca of Indian football, with the two most supported teams in the country being based within the city – Mohun Bagan and East Bengal.

The IFA had organised many historical tournaments like the Trades Cup, the Gladstone Cup, the Cooch Behar Cup and the coveted IFA Shield, prior to the incorporation of Calcutta Football League in 1898. The Trades Cup is the oldest tournament in Kolkata, being instituted in 1889.

== State teams ==
State teams of West Bengal
- Football (Men's): Football (Women's)

The following list includes the performance of West Bengal's state teams at major competitions.

=== Men's team ===
Tournament	Best performance
Santosh Trophy	Champions (1941–42, 1945–46, 1947–48, 1949–50, 1950–51, 1951–52, 1953–54, 1955–56, 1958–59, 1959–60, 1962–63, 1969–70, 1971–72, 1972–73, 1975–76, 1976–77, 1977–78, 1978–79, 1979–80, 1981–82, 1982–83 (Shared with Goa), 1986–87, 1988–89, 1993–94, 1994–95, 1995–96, 1996–97, 1997–98, 1998–99, 2009–10, 2010–11, 2016–17)
National Games	Gold (1994, 2011, 2022)
B.C. Roy Trophy	Champions (1961–62, 1966–67, 1967–68, 1969–70, 1973–74, 1974–75, 1976–77, 1977–78, 1980–81, 1981–82, 1983–84, 1984–85, 1986–87, 1989–90, 1994–95, 1995–96, 2003–04, 2024–25)
Mir Iqbal Hussain Trophy	Champions (1965–66, 1978–79, 1985–86, 1989–90, 1993–94, 1994–95, 1998–99, 1999–00, 2000–01, 2003–04, 2007–08, 2015–16)
M. Dutta Ray Trophy	Champions (1992, 1996, 2000, 2002, 2004, 2005)

=== Women's team ===
Tournament	Best performance
Rajmata Jijabai Trophy	Champions (1991–92, 1996–97)
National Games	Silver (1999, 2002)
Junior Girl's National Football Championship	Champions (2011–12)
Sub–Junior Girl's National Football Championship	Champions (2010–11)

== Affiliated district associations ==
The 23 district associations affiliated with the Indian Football Association.

No.	Association	District/Region
1	Alipurduar District Sports Association	Alipurduar
2	Bankura District Sports Association	Bankura
3	Burdwan District Sports Association	Paschim Bardhaman and Purba Bardhaman
4	Birbhum District Sports Association	Birbhum
5	Chandernagore Sporting Association	Chandannagar (Hooghly)
6	Cooch Behar District Sports Association	Cooch Behar
7	Darjeeling Gorkha Hill Sports Association	Darjeeling (Darjeeling)
8	Dakshin Dinajpur District Sports Association	Dakshin Dinajpur
9	Hooghly District Sports Association	Hooghly
10	Howrah District Sports Association	Howrah
11	Jalpaiguri District Sports Association	Jalpaiguri
12	Jhargram District Sports Association	Jhargram
13	Kalimpong District Sports Association	Kalimpong
14	Malda District Sports Association	Malda
15	Manbhum Sports Association	Purulia
16	Murshidabad District Sports Association	Murshidabad
17	Nadia District Sports Association	Nadia
18	North 24 Parganas District Sports Association	North 24 Parganas
19	Paschim Medinipur District Sports Association	Paschim Medinipur
20	Purba Medinipur District Sports Association	Purba Medinipur
21	Siliguri Mahakuma Krira Parishad	Siliguri (Darjeeling)
22	South 24 Parganas District Sports Association	South 24 Parganas
23	Uttar Dinajpur District Sports Association	Uttar Dinajpur

== Organisation of football in West Bengal ==
=== Men's ===
- Calcutta Football League
- IFA Shield
- Trades Cup
- Uttarbanga Cup
- Jayanta Chatterjee Inter District Football Tournament
- IFA Futsal Championship

=== Women's ===
- Calcutta Women's Football League
- Women's IFA Shield

=== Youth ===
- CFL 5th Division Group B
- IFA Nursery League

=== Evolution of the football system ===
Years		1889–1893	1893	1893–1993	1993–2019	2019–2021	2021–2023	2023–present
Level		1889–1893	1893	1893–1993	1993–2019	2019–2021	2021–2023	2023–present
Men's
State leagues	1	None	Formation of Indian Football Association (IFA)	CFL Premier Division				
State leagues	2	None	Formation of Indian Football Association (IFA)	None		CFL 1st Division		
State leagues	3	None	Formation of Indian Football Association (IFA)	None				CFL 2nd Division
State leagues	4	None	Formation of Indian Football Association (IFA)	None				CFL 3rd Division
State leagues	5	None	Formation of Indian Football Association (IFA)	None				CFL 4th Division
State leagues	6	None	Formation of Indian Football Association (IFA)	None				CFL 5th Division Group A
State leagues	7	None	Formation of Indian Football Association (IFA)	None				CFL 5th Division Group B
Cup competitions		Trades Cup				Discontinued		
Cup competitions				IFA Shield			Not continued	
Women's
State leagues	1			None	Kanyashree Cup Premier Division A			
State leagues	2			None				Kanyashree Cup Premier Division B
Cup competitions				None				Women's IFA Shield

== Notable footballers visits ==
Because it is often called India's football capital, many international footballing personalities have visited Kolkata, West Bengal. In 1977, Mohun Bagan played a friendly match against the famous North American Soccer League club New York Cosmos, which featured Pelé. The match, which took place at Eden Gardens, had an attendance of 80,000. The match ended 2–2. Others who have visited Kolkata are Argentinean footballing legend Diego Maradona and current star Lionel Messi. Lionel Messi made his captaincy debut for his national side in Kolkata's, West Bengal Vivekananda Yuba Bharati Krirangan on 2 September 2011 against Venezuela. German legends, including Franz Beckenbauer and Oliver Kahn, have also visited. The best goalkeeper in football history, Russian Lev Yashin, visited in 1955 and 1973. English World Cup–winning legend Bobby Moore was the chief guest during the 1984 Nehru Cup. Emeka Ezuego, the Nigerian World Cup player, played for East Bengal and Mohammedan Sporting. Majid Bishkar, the Iranian World Cup player, played for East Bengal and Mohammedan Sporting from 1980 to 1986. Cameroon footballing legend Roger Milla played for Diamond Club in some exhibition matches in the Centenary Celebration of Mohun Bagan. Uruguay football captain Diego Forlan visited Kolkata in 2010. Karl-Heinz Rummenigge visited in 2010. Julian Caminho visited Kolkata, West Bengal twice—first in 1988 to play for East Bengal and again in 2011. MacDonald Mukansi played for East Bengal in 2007.

Others who have also visited are Terry Paine, Carlos Alberto Torres, Enzo Francescoli, Valencia Ramos, Jorge Burruchaga, Ricardo Gareca, László Kiss, Nicky Butt, Włodzimierz Smolarek, Andrzej Buncol, Eusébio, Ronald Koeman, Paul Breitner, and Swansea City's Neil Taylor.

In July 2023, Argentine World Cup and World Cup Golden Gloves winner Emiliano Martinez also visited the city of Joy, courtesy to Satadru Dutta's initiative. He was grandly welcomed by the citizens and Mohun Bagan and East Bengal.

== Footballers from West Bengal ==
The state of West Bengal has contributed many legends to Indian football, such as:

- Chuni Goswami, first Padma Shri awardee, awarded best striker of Asia in 1962.
- Gostho Pal, footballer, who was member of the Mohun Bagan team that won the IFA shield against a British team in the pre-independence period.
- Krishanu Dey, footballer, known as the "Indian Maradona".
- Mohammed Salim, first player from the Indian subcontinent to play overseas, in the year 1936 for the Scottish Club Celtic FC.
- P. K. Banerjee, named Indian Footballer of the 20th century by, and awardee of the FIFA Order of Merit.
- Shailen Manna, footballer, the only Asian Footballer ever to be named among the 10 best Captains in the world by the English FA in 1953.
- Subrata Paul, member of Indian team, first Indian goalkeeper to play professionally for a foreign club in 1st division (Danish Superliga).
- Sudip Chatterjee, footballer, considered among the finest in Indian football, declared AIFF player of the decade in 1994.

== International players origin ==
- Robin Dutt, former manager of Bundesliga club, Werder Bremen.
- Neil Taylor, Welsh footballer of half-Bengali origin.

== Arjuna award winners ==
- P. K. Banerjee
- Chuni Goswami
- Arun Lal Ghosh
- Prasun Banerjee
- Sudhir Karmakar
- Shanti Mullick
- Subrata Bhattacharya
- Deepak Kumar Mondal
- Subrata Pal

== See also ==
- Bengal Super League
- Premier League Soccer
- History of Indian football
- Football in Kolkata
