= Indian Football Association =

Governing body of association football in West Bengal, India

Indian Football Association (West Bengal)
- Sport: Football
- Jurisdiction: West Bengal
- Membership: 23 district associations
- Abbreviation: IFA
- Founded: 1893; 133 years ago
- Affiliation: All India Football Federation (AIFF)
- Headquarters: Kolkata, West Bengal
- President: Ajit Banerjee
- Secretary: Anirban Dutta

Official website
- ifawb.in

The Indian Football Association, abbreviated as IFA, is the organisation that administers football in the Indian state of West Bengal. It is the oldest football association in India and was founded in 1893. Among the founders was former English international Elphinstone Jackson.

The IFA organises tournaments such as the Calcutta Football League, the IFA Shield, the Calcutta Women's Football League and the Women's IFA Shield. In 2021, the IFA also took an initiative to start its own futsal league. It also sends state teams for Santosh Trophy and Rajmata Jijabai Trophy.

== History ==
Contrary to the name, the association does not administer the game in India, a task that falls to the All India Football Federation (AIFF), instead governs the game in the state of West Bengal. However, before the formation of the AIFF, the IFA was in de facto control of football in India by virtue of its administration by Englishmen as well as its affiliation to the Football Association. Hence, all foreign tours were conducted by the IFA and also foreign teams negotiated with the IFA for visits to India. In its formative years, the only Indian representative in the English dominated executive committee was Kalicharan Mitra from the Sovabazar Club. By vigorously promoting the game in Bengal, the IFA became undivided India's premier football body in the early decades of the 20th century.

Through the efforts of Nagendra Prasad Sarbadhikari (the father of Indian football), A.R. Brown and B.C. Lindsay of Dalhousie AC, and Watson of Calcutta FC, the IFA was established in 1893. A.R. Brown was the first Secretary of the IFA. Norman Prichard, the first Indian to win an Olympic medal, was the Secretary of the IFA in 1900.The most remarkable person to head the IFA was the Maharaja of Santosh, Sir Manmatha Nath Roy Chowdhury. During his six year tenure as President, the IFA played an instrumental role in the formation of the AIFF.

The IFA had organised many historical tournaments like the Trades Cup, the Gladstone Cup, the Cooch Behar Cup and the coveted IFA Shield, prior to the incorporation of Calcutta Football League in 1898. The Trades Cup is the oldest tournament in Kolkata, being instituted in 1889.

Clubs outside Bengal complained about the lack of neutrality in the affairs of the IFA. This disillusionment of clubs and patrons led to the formation of associations such as the Western India Football Association, which preferred to be governed by themselves rather than by the IFA. After years of numerous conferences and meetings, the IFA along with other five regional football associations broke their mutual deadlock to form the AIFF in 1937.

== State teams ==
=== Men ===
- West Bengal football team
- West Bengal under-20 football team
- West Bengal under-15 football team
- West Bengal under-13 football team

=== Women ===
- West Bengal women's football team
- West Bengal women's under-19 football team
- West Bengal women's under-17 football team

== Affiliated district associations ==
The 23 district associations affiliated with the Indian Football Association.

No.	Association	District/Region
1	Alipurduar District Sports Association	Alipurduar
2	Bankura District Sports Association	Bankura
3	Burdwan District Sports Association	Paschim Bardhaman and Purba Bardhaman
4	Birbhum District Sports Association	Birbhum
5	Chandernagore Sporting Association	Chandannagar (Hooghly)
6	Cooch Behar District Sports Association	Cooch Behar
7	Darjeeling Gorkha Hill Sports Association	Darjeeling (Darjeeling)
8	Dakshin Dinajpur District Sports Association	Dakshin Dinajpur
9	Hooghly District Sports Association	Hooghly
10	Howrah District Sports Association	Howrah
11	Jalpaiguri District Sports Association	Jalpaiguri
12	Jhargram District Sports Association	Jhargram
13	Kalimpong District Sports Association	Kalimpong
14	Malda District Sports Association	Malda
15	Manbhum Sports Association	Purulia
16	Murshidabad District Sports Association	Murshidabad
17	Nadia District Sports Association	Nadia
18	North 24 Parganas District Sports Association	North 24 Parganas
19	Paschim Medinipur District Sports Association	Paschim Medinipur
20	Purba Medinipur District Sports Association	Purba Medinipur
21	Siliguri Mahakuma Krira Parishad	Siliguri (Darjeeling)
22	South 24 Parganas District Sports Association	South 24 Parganas
23	Uttar Dinajpur District Sports Association	Uttar Dinajpur

== Competitions ==
=== Men's ===
- Calcutta Football League
- IFA Shield
- Bengal Super League (franchise)
- Uttarbanga Cup
- Jayanta Chatterjee Inter District Football Tournament
- IFA Futsal Championship

=== Women's ===
- Calcutta Women's Football League
- Women's IFA Shield

=== Youth ===
- CFL 5th Division Group B
- IFA Nursery League

== West Bengal Football League pyramid ==
=== Men's ===
Calcutta Football League
Tier	Division
1 _{(Level 5 on Indian Football pyramid)}	CFL Premier Division _{↑promote (I-League 3) ↓relegate 4}
2 _{(Level 6 on Indian Football pyramid)}	CFL 1st Division _{↑promote 2 ↓relegate 2}
3 _{(Level 7 on Indian Football pyramid)}	CFL 2nd Division _{↑promote 2 ↓relegate 2}
4 _{(Level 8 on Indian Football pyramid)}	CFL 3rd Division _{↑promote 2 ↓relegate 2}
5 _{(Level 9 on Indian Football pyramid)}	CFL 4th Division _{↑promote 2 ↓relegate 2}
6 _{(Level 10 on Indian Football pyramid)}	CFL 5th Division Group A _{↑promote 2 ↓relegate 2}
7 _{(Level 11 on Indian Football pyramid)}	CFL 5th Division Group B _{↑promote 2}

=== Women's ===
Calcutta Women's Football League
Tier	Division
I _{(Level 3 on Indian Women's Football pyramid)}	CWFL Premier Division A _{↑promote (to Indian Women's League 2) ↓relegate}
II _{(Level 4 on Indian Women's Football pyramid)}	CWFL Premier Division B _{↑promote}

== Evolution ==
Years		1889–1893	1893	1893–1993	1993–2019	2019–2021	2021–2023	2023–present
Level		1889–1893	1893	1893–1993	1993–2019	2019–2021	2021–2023	2023–present
Men's
State leagues	1	None	Formation of Indian Football Association (IFA)	CFL Premier Division				
State leagues	2	None	Formation of Indian Football Association (IFA)	None		CFL 1st Division		
State leagues	3	None	Formation of Indian Football Association (IFA)	None				CFL 2nd Division
State leagues	4	None	Formation of Indian Football Association (IFA)	None				CFL 3rd Division
State leagues	5	None	Formation of Indian Football Association (IFA)	None				CFL 4th Division
State leagues	6	None	Formation of Indian Football Association (IFA)	None				CFL 5th Division Group A
State leagues	7	None	Formation of Indian Football Association (IFA)	None				CFL 5th Division Group B
Cup competitions		Trades Cup				Discontinued		
Cup competitions				IFA Shield			Not continued	
Women's
State leagues	1			None	Kanyashree Cup Premier Division A			
State leagues	2			None				Kanyashree Cup Premier Division B
Cup competitions				None				Women's IFA Shield

== Management ==
As of 2022

Office	Name
President	Ajit Banerjee
Chairman	Subrata Dutta
Vice-president(s)	Sudeshna Mukherjee
Vice-president(s)	Saurav Pal
Vice-president(s)	Swarup Biswas
Secretary	Anirban Dutta
Assistant Secretary(s)	Rakesh Kumar Jha
Assistant Secretary(s)	MD Jamal
Assistant Secretary(s)	Biswajit Bhaduri
Treasurer	Debasish Sarkar

== Past office bearers ==
List of Presidents of the IFA:

=== Presidents ===
Presidents	Tenure
William Macpherson	1893 – 1900
Francis McLean	1901 – 1908
Lawrence Jenkins	1909 – 1915
Lancelot Sanderson	1916 – 1919
Ewart Greaves	1920 – 1926
Philip Lindsay Buckland	1927 – 1928
Thomas Lamb	1928 – 1929
J. Reid Kay	1930 – 1931
Manmatha Nath Roy Chowdhury	1932 – 1933
Thomas Howard Elderton	1934 – 1935
Manmatha Nath Roy Chowdhury	1935 – 1938
H. H. Nicholls	1939 – 1940
S. N. Banerjee	1940 – 1941
H. R. Norton	1941 – 1942
B. C. Ghose	1942 – 1944
Khwaja Nazimuddin	1945 – 1946
H. Stanhape	1946 – 1947
S. K. Gupta	1947 – 1950
S. M. Basu	1955 – 1956
Niren Dey	1956 – 1961
Atulya Ghosh	1962 – 1966
S. K. Acharya	1967 – 1968
N. C. Talukdar	1969 – 1975
Gourinath Mitra	1976
Ashoke Kumar Sen	1976 – 1977
Samarendra Chandra Deb	1978 – 1980
H. K. Dey	1981 – 1984
Ashoke Ghosh	1985
H. K. Dey	1986 – 1987
R. N. Dey	1988
Ajit Kumar Sengupta	1989
No data	?
Ranjit Gupta	2002
No data	?
Aditya Kashyap	2006 – 2007
Satyabrata Ganguly	2007 – 2014
Subroto Dutta	2014 – 2018
Ajit Banerjee	2018 – present

== See also ==
- List of Indian state football associations
- Football in Kolkata
- Football in West Bengal
- Football in India
- Premier League Soccer
