= 2026 Reliance Foundation Development League =

Reliance Foundation Development League
- Season: 2026
- Dates: 15 December 2025 – 18 April 2026
- Champions: Bengaluru FC (3rd title)
- Next Gen Cup: Bengaluru FC
- Matches: 255
- Goals: 870 (3.41 per match)

The 2025–26 Reliance Foundation Development League was the fifth season of the Reliance Foundation Development League, developmental football league organised by the Reliance Foundation.

The season features 54 teams divided into nine regions, held across multiple regions from 15 December 2025. Mohun Bagan SG are the defending champions.

== Exposure trip to Japan ==
In July 2026, the top three teams — Bengaluru FC, FC Goa, and Punjab FC were invited to participate in an international exposure tour in Fukuoka, Japan. The initiative aimed to provide India's leading under-21 players with experience against high-level Japanese youth opposition while exposing coaches and players to different tactical and developmental philosophies.

Each Indian club played a series of friendly matches against Japanese sides including Avispa Fukuoka, Sagan Tosu, Giravanz Kitakyushu, and FC Baleine Shimonoseki. In addition to the matches, the three clubs' coaching staff attended a football workshop in Fukuoka where coaching methods, tactical approaches, youth development systems, and competition structures were discussed with their Japanese counterparts.

The tour followed previous international opportunities provided through the RFDL, including participation in the Premier League Next Generation Cup, and formed part of the league's broader objective of increasing international exposure for Indian youth footballers.

14 July 2026 Friendly	(India) Goa	0–1	(Japan) Sagan Tosu U18	Fukuoka, Japan
11:30 IST		Report	Ono 6'	Stadium: Saga Field

15 July 2026 Friendly	(India) Bengaluru	3–2	(Japan) Giravanz Kitakyushu U18	Fukuoka, Japan
12:30 IST	R. Anil 61'; S. Kom 75'; Arbash 90'	Report	Imai 40'; Samson 69' (o.g.)	Stadium: Field C

15 July 2026 Friendly	(India) Punjab	5–0	(Japan) Avispa Fukuoka U18	Fukuoka, Japan
12:30 IST	Shami 3', 28'; Dodum 42'; Shaiza 55'; V. Yadav 90+2'	Report		Stadium: Global Arena

== Format ==
The whole competition was divided into 4 phases: Regional Qualifiers, Zonal Group Stage, National Group Stage, National Championship Stage.

54 teams were divided into 9 regions for the regional qualifiers, each containing 6 teams. Top 3 teams from each group qualified (except Meghalaya-Assam, ROI-1 and ROI-2, where 2 teams qualified) for Zonal group stage.

The qualified 24 teams were divided into 4 groups of 6 zones, from which top 3 teams from each group qualified for National group stage.

Phase	Name	Groups	Teams
I	Regional Qualifiers	9	54
II	Zonal Group Stage	4	24
III	National Group Stage	2	12
IV	National Championship Stage	—N/a	4

== Teams ==
Teams are divided into 9 zones for the regional qualifiers, each containing 6 teams.

State/Region	Venue	Clubs	App (last)
Goa	Duler Football Stadium, Mapusa; Guirim Football Ground, Guirim	Churchill Brothers	3rd (2024–25)
Goa	Duler Football Stadium, Mapusa; Guirim Football Ground, Guirim	CD Salgaocar	3rd (2024–25)
Goa	Duler Football Stadium, Mapusa; Guirim Football Ground, Guirim	Dempo SC	4th (2024–25)
Goa	Duler Football Stadium, Mapusa; Guirim Football Ground, Guirim	FC Goa	5th (2024–25)
Goa	Duler Football Stadium, Mapusa; Guirim Football Ground, Guirim	SESA FA	4th (2024–25)
Goa	Duler Football Stadium, Mapusa; Guirim Football Ground, Guirim	SC de Goa	3rd (2024–25)
Kerala	TMK Arena, Vadakkencherry	Kerala Blasters	5th (2024–25)
Kerala	TMK Arena, Vadakkencherry	Kerala United	2nd (2024–25)
Kerala	TMK Arena, Vadakkencherry	Kovalam FC	3rd (2024)
Kerala	TMK Arena, Vadakkencherry	Parappur Kerala	4th (2024–25)
Kerala	TMK Arena, Vadakkencherry	Real Malabar	Debut
Kerala	TMK Arena, Vadakkencherry	SAI Kollam	2nd (2024)
Kolkata	Kalyani Stadium A, Kalyani; Barrackpore Stadium, Barrackpore	Bengal Future Champs	Debut
Kolkata	Kalyani Stadium A, Kalyani; Barrackpore Stadium, Barrackpore	Diamond Harbour	2nd (2024–25)
Kolkata	Kalyani Stadium A, Kalyani; Barrackpore Stadium, Barrackpore	East Bengal	4th (2024–25)
Kolkata	Kalyani Stadium A, Kalyani; Barrackpore Stadium, Barrackpore	Mohun Bagan	4th (2024–25)
Kolkata	Kalyani Stadium A, Kalyani; Barrackpore Stadium, Barrackpore	United SC	4th (2024–25)
Kolkata	Kalyani Stadium A, Kalyani; Barrackpore Stadium, Barrackpore	Victoria SC	Debut
Meghalaya–Mizoram	MFA Ground, Shillong, Meghalaya	4ForAll FC	3rd (2024–25)
Meghalaya–Mizoram	MFA Ground, Shillong, Meghalaya	Greenfield FA	2nd (2024–25)
Meghalaya–Mizoram	MFA Ground, Shillong, Meghalaya	Langsning	Debut
Meghalaya–Mizoram	MFA Ground, Shillong, Meghalaya	NorthEast United	4th (2024–25)
Meghalaya–Mizoram	MFA Ground, Shillong, Meghalaya	Rangdajied United	3rd (2024–25)
Meghalaya–Mizoram	MFA Ground, Shillong, Meghalaya	Shillong Lajong	4th (2024–25)
Mumbai	Reliance Corporate Park, Navi Mumbai	CFCI	2nd (2024)
Mumbai	Reliance Corporate Park, Navi Mumbai	Iron Born FC	3rd (2024)
Mumbai	Reliance Corporate Park, Navi Mumbai	Maharashtra Oranje	3rd (2024–25)
Mumbai	Reliance Corporate Park, Navi Mumbai	MYJ–GMSC	3rd (2024–25)
Mumbai	Reliance Corporate Park, Navi Mumbai	Millat FC	3rd (2024–25)
Mumbai	Reliance Corporate Park, Navi Mumbai	RFYC	5th (2024–25)
North	Frontier FC Ground, Chhawla, Delhi; Sudeva FC Ground, Civil Lines, Delhi	Downtown Heroes	Debut
North	Frontier FC Ground, Chhawla, Delhi; Sudeva FC Ground, Civil Lines, Delhi	Inter Kashi	Debut
North	Frontier FC Ground, Chhawla, Delhi; Sudeva FC Ground, Civil Lines, Delhi	Punjab FC	4th (2024–25)
North	Frontier FC Ground, Chhawla, Delhi; Sudeva FC Ground, Civil Lines, Delhi	Rajasthan United	4th (2024–25)
North	Frontier FC Ground, Chhawla, Delhi; Sudeva FC Ground, Civil Lines, Delhi	Sporting Club Delhi	2nd (2022) (Note: Previously played as Hyderabad FC)
North	Frontier FC Ground, Chhawla, Delhi; Sudeva FC Ground, Civil Lines, Delhi	Sudeva Delhi	4th (2024–25)
ROI–1	SAI Ground, Imphal, Manipur	ASUFII FA	Debut
ROI–1	SAI Ground, Imphal, Manipur	Chhaygaon FC	Debut
ROI–1	SAI Ground, Imphal, Manipur	Classic FA	3rd (2024–25)
ROI–1	SAI Ground, Imphal, Manipur	Imphal Youth FC	Debut
ROI–1	SAI Ground, Imphal, Manipur	SAI-RC	3rd (2024–25)
ROI–1	SAI Ground, Imphal, Manipur	Subansiri United FC	Debut
ROI–2	JRD Tata Sports Complex, Jamshedpur, Jharkhand; Flatlets Ground, Jamshedpur, Jharkhand	Bidhannagar Municipal SA	Debut
ROI–2	JRD Tata Sports Complex, Jamshedpur, Jharkhand; Flatlets Ground, Jamshedpur, Jharkhand	Chhattisgarh United FC	Debut
ROI–2	JRD Tata Sports Complex, Jamshedpur, Jharkhand; Flatlets Ground, Jamshedpur, Jharkhand	Football 4 Change Academy	3rd (2024–25)
ROI–2	JRD Tata Sports Complex, Jamshedpur, Jharkhand; Flatlets Ground, Jamshedpur, Jharkhand	Jamshedpur FC	5th (2024–25)
ROI–2	JRD Tata Sports Complex, Jamshedpur, Jharkhand; Flatlets Ground, Jamshedpur, Jharkhand	Sports Odisha	Debut
ROI–2	JRD Tata Sports Complex, Jamshedpur, Jharkhand; Flatlets Ground, Jamshedpur, Jharkhand	Zinc FA	2nd (2024)
South	HAL SC Ground, Bengaluru, Karnataka	Alchemy IFA	Debut
South	HAL SC Ground, Bengaluru, Karnataka	Bengaluru FC	5th (2024–25)
South	HAL SC Ground, Bengaluru, Karnataka	Kickstart FC	4th (2024–25)
South	HAL SC Ground, Bengaluru, Karnataka	Roots FC	4th (2024–25)
South	HAL SC Ground, Bengaluru, Karnataka	South United	Debut
South	HAL SC Ground, Bengaluru, Karnataka	Sreenidi Deccan	4th (2024–25)

== Regional qualifiers ==
=== Goa Region ===
Pos	Team	Pld	W	D	L	GF	GA	GD	Pts	Qualification	DEM	SESA	FCG	SFC	SCG	CBFC
1	Dempo	5	5	0	0	14	0	+14	15	Advance to Zonal group stage		1–0		2–0		
2	SESA	5	3	1	1	12	4	+8	10	Advance to Zonal group stage				1–0		
3	Goa	5	3	1	1	9	5	+4	10	Advance to Zonal group stage	0–2	2–2		3–1	3–0	1–0
4	Salgaocar	5	2	0	3	8	9	−1	6							
5	Sporting Goa	5	1	0	4	5	14	−9	3		0–4	1–3		2–3		
6	Churchill Brothers	5	0	0	5	2	18	−16	0		0–5	0–6		1–4	1–2	

Source: RFDL
Legend: Blue = home team win; Yellow = draw; Red = away team win.

==== Top scorers ====
Rank	Player	Club	Goals
1	Royson Colaco	Salgaocar	4
1	Swavel Cristiano Furtado	Dempo	4
3	Murphy Fernandes	Dempo	3
3	Saish Gaunkar	SESA	3
3	Likson Rebelo	SESA	3

==== Clean sheets ====
Rank	Player	Club	Clean sheets
1	Deep Singh	Dempo	5
2	Lionel Daryl Rymmei	Goa	2
2	Micky Dias	SESA	2

=== North Region ===
Pos	Team	Pld	W	D	L	GF	GA	GD	Pts	Qualification	PFC	SUD	RUFC	SCD	DWN	IKFC
1	Punjab	5	4	0	1	18	4	+14	12	Advance to Zonal group stage			5–0		4–0	5–0
2	Sudeva Delhi	5	3	1	1	14	7	+7	10	Advance to Zonal group stage	3–2		1–3		5–1	
3	Rajasthan United	5	2	2	1	11	12	−1	8	Advance to Zonal group stage				3–1	2–2	3–3
4	SC Delhi	5	2	1	2	8	6	+2	7		1–2	1–1				
5	Downtown Heroes	5	1	1	3	5	13	−8	4					0–2		2–0
6	Inter Kashi	5	0	1	4	3	17	−14	1			0–4		0–3		

Source: RFDL
Legend: Blue = home team win; Yellow = draw; Red = away team win.

==== Top scorers ====
Rank	Player	Club	Goals
1	Omang Dodum	Punjab	6
2	Sachin	Sudeva Delhi	4
2	Pangambam Naoba Meitei	Rajasthan United	4
4	Alan Saji	SC Delhi	3

==== Clean sheets ====
Rank	Player	Club	Clean sheets
1	Naveen Saini	Punjab	3
2	Mohammed Fizaan Jabir	Punjab	2

=== South Region ===
Pos	Team	Pld	W	D	L	GF	GA	GD	Pts	Qualification	BFC	SUFC	SRE	KIC	ALC	ROOT
1	Bengaluru	5	5	0	0	16	0	+16	15	Advance to Zonal group stage					3–0	3–0
2	South United	5	4	0	1	18	6	+12	12	Advance to Zonal group stage	0–4		3–2			
3	Sreenidi Deccan	5	3	0	2	10	5	+5	9	Advance to Zonal group stage	0–1			2–0		
4	Kickstart	5	1	1	3	4	18	−14	4		0–5	0–8				
5	Alchemy IFA	5	1	0	4	5	11	−6	3			0–2	1–4	1–2		
6	Roots	5	0	1	4	2	15	−13	1			0–5	0–2	2–2	0–3	

Source: RFDL
Legend: Blue = home team win; Yellow = draw; Red = away team win.

==== Top scorers ====
Rank	Player	Club	Goals
1	Md Altab Hussain	South United	6
2	Md Arbash	Bengaluru	4
2	Aiborlang Kharthangmaw	Sreenidi Deccan	4
2	Makakmayum Daniyal	South United	4
5	Nirupam Gowda H	South United	3
5	Prajwal V Gowda	South United	3
5	Rakshit P Anil	Bengaluru	3
5	Serto Worneilen Kom	Bengaluru	3

==== Clean sheets ====
Rank	Player	Club	Clean sheets
1	Aheibam Suraj Singh	Bengaluru	5
2	Khulakpam Saroj	South United	3
3	Shuhaid Koya Thangal	Sreenidi Deccan	2
4	Arun M	South United	1

=== Kerala Region ===
Pos	Team	Pld	W	D	L	GF	GA	GD	Pts	Qualification	PFC	MFC	KBFC	KUFC	SAI	KOV
1	PFC Kerala	5	5	0	0	9	2	+7	15	Advance to Zonal group stage						1–0
2	Real Malabar	5	3	1	1	5	4	+1	10	Advance to Zonal group stage	0–2		1–0	2–1		
3	Kerala Blasters	5	3	0	2	13	6	+7	9	Advance to Zonal group stage	1–2				4–1	5–0
4	Kerala United	5	2	0	3	11	7	+4	6		1–2		2–3		2–0	5–0
5	SAI Kollam	5	1	1	3	4	10	−6	4		0–2	1–1				
6	Kovalam	5	0	0	5	1	14	−13	0			0–1			1–2	

Source: RFDL
Legend: Blue = home team win; Yellow = draw; Red = away team win.

==== Top scorers ====
Rank	Player	Club	Goals
1	Sreekuttan MS	Kerala Blasters	5
2	Mohammed Adhnan K	Kerala Blasters	4
3	Ibrahim AN	Kerala United	3

==== Clean sheets ====
Rank	Player	Club	Clean sheets
1	Farhan KB	PFC Kerala	3
2	Saviyol Varghese	Real Malabar	2
2	Aadil VS	Kerala United	2
4	Alsabith ST	Kerala Blasters	1
4	Mohamed Fayiz	PFC Kerala	1

=== Rest Of India 1 ===
Pos	Team	Pld	W	D	L	GF	GA	GD	Pts	Qualification	ASU	CFA	SUB	CHH	SAI	IUFC
1	Asufii FA	5	3	1	1	15	8	+7	10	Advance to Zonal group stage		1–1			6–3	
2	Classic FA	5	2	3	0	7	4	+3	9	Advance to Zonal group stage			1–1	2–0		
3	Subansiri United FC	5	2	2	1	6	5	+1	8		3–2			1–0	0–1	1–1
4	Chhayagaon FC	5	2	0	3	6	9	−3	6 (Note: Head-to-head points: Chhayagaon FC 3, SAI RC 0)		1–4				2–0	3–2
5	SAI RC	5	2	0	3	9	11	−2	6			1–2				4–1
6	Imphal Youth FC	5	0	2	3	5	11	−6	2		0–2	1–1				

Source: RFDL
Legend: Blue = home team win; Yellow = draw; Red = away team win.

==== Top scorers ====
Rank	Player	Club	Goals
1	Wangkheirakpam John Singh	ASUFII FA	6
2	Oinam Romio Singh	SAI-RC	3
2	Ngararshing Raikhan	ASUFII	3

==== Clean sheets ====
Rank	Player	Club	Clean sheets
1	Rohit Deka	Chhayagaon	1
1	Shrinivas Keisham	Classic	1
1	Khaidem Amarjit Singh	SAI-RC	1
1	Eziio	ASUFII	1
1	Nur Alam Gazi	Subansiri United	1

=== Rest Of India 2 ===
Pos	Team	Pld	W	D	L	GF	GA	GD	Pts	Qualification	JFC	BSA	ZNF	SOD	F4C	CHU
1	Jamshedpur FC	5	4	0	1	38	3	+35	12	Withdrew from Zonal group stage		0–1	2–0	9–0	7–2	20–0
2	Bidhannagar Municipal SA	5	3	2	0	15	5	+10	11	Advance to Zonal group stage			1–1			7–0
3	Zinc FA	5	2	2	1	10	5	+5	8							6–0
4	Sports Odisha	5	2	0	3	10	16	−6	6			1–3	0–1			6–1
5	Football 4 Change	5	1	2	2	20	18	+2	5			3–3	2–2	2–3		11–3
6	Chhattisgarh United	5	0	0	5	4	50	−46	0							

Source: RFDL
Legend: Blue = home team win; Yellow = draw; Red = away team win.

==== Top scorers ====
Rank	Player	Club	Goals
1	Rayan C	Jamshedpur	10
2	Heerangamba Seram	Jamshedpur	9
3	Lawmsangzuala	Jamshedpur	7
4	Henjoimang Khongsai	Football 4 Change	6
4	Lalminlun Khongsai	Football 4 Change	6
6	Rabi Mondal	Bidhannagar	4

==== Clean sheets ====
Rank	Player	Club	Clean sheets
1	Ritabrata Sarkar	Jamshedpur	3
2	Piti Baskey	Jamshedpur	2
2	Axay	Zinc	2
2	Deba Baski	Bidhannagar	2

=== Kolkata Region ===
Pos	Team	Pld	W	D	L	GF	GA	GD	Pts	Qualification	EAB	MBSG	DHB	USC	VIC	IFA
1	East Bengal	5	4	0	1	14	2	+12	12 (Note: Head-to-head points: East Bengal 3, Mohun Bagan 0)	Advance to Zonal group stage				0–1	3–1	8–0
2	Mohun Bagan SG	5	4	0	1	17	2	+15	12	Advance to Zonal group stage	0–2		2–0			1–0
3	Diamond Harbour	5	3	0	2	9	3	+6	9	Advance to Zonal group stage	0–1			1–0	5–0	
4	United SC	5	2	1	2	5	11	−6	7	Advance to Zonal group stage		0–8				
5	Victoria Sporting Club	5	1	0	4	3	16	−13	3			0–6		0–2		
6	IFA Bengal Future Champs	5	0	1	4	2	16	−14	1				0–3	2–2	0–2	

Source: RFDL
Legend: Blue = home team win; Yellow = draw; Red = away team win.

==== Top scorers ====
Rank	Player	Club	Goals
1	Suhail Ahmad Bhat	Mohun Bagan SG	5
2	Debojit Roy	East Bengal	4
2	Vanlalpeka Guite	East Bengal	4
4	Kazi Talal Ibtida	Diamond Harbour	3

==== Clean sheets ====
Rank	Player	Club	Clean sheets
1	Priyansh Dubey	Mohun Bagan SG	4
2	Mohd Arbaz	Diamond Habour	3
2	Julfikar Gazi	East Bengal	3

=== Mumbai Region ===
Pos	Team	Pld	W	D	L	GF	GA	GD	Pts	Qualification	RFYC	ORA	CFCI	MYJ	MIL	IBF
1	RFYC	5	4	1	0	9	1	+8	13	Advance to Zonal group stage				1–0	1–0	5–0
2	Maharashtra Oranje	5	3	1	1	11	3	+8	10	Advance to Zonal group stage	1–1			3–1		
3	Community FC India	5	3	0	2	7	8	−1	9	Advance to Zonal group stage	0–1	0–4				3–1
4	MYJ-GMSC	5	1	1	3	7	8	−1	4 (Note: Head-to-head points: MYJ-GSM 1, Millat FC 1)				1–2			
5	Millat	5	1	1	3	7	11	−4	4			0–3	1–2	2–2		
6	Iron Born	5	1	0	4	5	15	−10	3			1–0		0–3	3–4	

Source: RFDL , AIFF
Legend: Blue = home team win; Yellow = draw; Red = away team win.

==== Top scorers ====
Rank	Player	Club	Goals
1	Mayur Jadhav	Millat	6
2	Kaustubh Ajitkumar Shinde	Maharashtra Oranje	4
2	Nirvaan Bhatt	Community FC India	4

==== Clean sheets ====
Rank	Player	Club	Clean sheets
1	Abhinand PB	RFYC	3
2	Aaryan Mhatre	Maharashtra Oranje	2

=== Meghalaya-Mizoram Region ===
Pos	Team	Pld	W	D	L	GF	GA	GD	Pts	Qualification	NEUTD	RFC	LFC	SLFC	GFA	4FA
1	NorthEast United	5	3	2	0	22	3	+19	11 (Note: Head-to-head points: NEUTD 1, Rangdajied 1)	Advance to Zonal group stage						
2	Rangdajied United	5	3	2	0	11	5	+6	11	Advance to Zonal group stage	0–0		2–2		2–0	4–1
3	Langsning	5	3	1	1	15	8	+7	10		2–4					6–0
4	Shillong Lajong	5	2	0	3	13	9	+4	6		1–2	2–3	1–3		3–0	6–1
5	Greenfield FA	5	1	1	3	7	8	−1	4		0–0		1–2			
6	4 For All FA	5	0	0	5	3	38	−35	0		0–16				1–6	

Source: RFDL , AIFF
Legend: Blue = home team win; Yellow = draw; Red = away team win.

==== Top scorers ====
Rank	Player	Club	Goals
1	Tanbir Dey	NorthEast United	7
1	Mocha Irom	NorthEast United	7
3	Emanbha Marbaniang	Shillong Lajong	5
4	Pasborlang Khonglikong	Rangdajied United	3
4	Samuel Phawa	Langsning	3
4	Banlamkupar Rynjah	Shillong Lajong	3
4	Kyrmenskhem Mukhim	Langsning	3

==== Clean sheets ====
Rank	Player	Club	Clean sheets
1	Divyaj Thakkar	NorthEast United	3
2	Meshan Banjop Sumer	Rangdajied United	2

== Zonal group stage ==
A total of 24 teams progressed to the Zonal group stage.

=== Qualified teams ===
No.	Club	Qualified as
1	East Bengal	East region champions
2	Mohun Bagan	East region runners-up
3	Diamond Harbour	East region 3rd
4	Dempo SC	Goa region champions
5	SESA FA	Goa region runners-up
6	FC Goa	Goa region 3rd
7	Parappur FC Kerala	Kerala region champions
8	Real Malabar FC	Kerala region runners-up
9	Kerala Blasters	Kerala region 3rd
10	NorthEast United	Meghalaya–Assam region champions
11	Rangdajied United	Meghalaya–Mizoram region runners-up
12	RFYC	Mumbai region champions
13	Maharashtra Oranje	Mumbai region runners-up
14	CFCI	Mumbai region 3rd
15	Punjab FC	North region champions
16	Sudeva Delhi	North region runners-up
17	Rajasthan United	North region 3rd
18	Asufii FA	Rest Of India 1 region champions
19	Classic FA	Rest Of India 1 runners-up
20	~~Jamshedpur~~; United SC	~~Rest Of India 2 region champions~~ East region 4th
21	Bidhannagar Municipal SA	Rest Of India 2 runners-up
22	Bengaluru FC	South region champions
23	South United	South region runners-up
24	Sreenidi Deccan	South region 3rd

=== Group A ===
Pos	Team	Pld	W	D	L	GF	GA	GD	Pts	Qualification	SRE	KBFC	BFC	SUFC	PFC	MFC
1	Sreenidi Deccan	5	3	2	0	12	4	+8	11	Advance to National group stage			3–0			
2	Kerala Blasters	5	3	1	1	12	5	+7	10	Advance to National group stage	1–1		1–3	4–0	3–0	
3	Bengaluru	5	3	0	2	12	9	+3	9	Advance to National group stage				1–2		5–1
4	South United	5	2	1	2	12	15	−3	7		3–3					5–4
5	PFC Kerala	5	1	1	3	5	11	−6	4		0–3		2–3	3–2		
6	Real Malabar	5	0	1	4	6	15	−9	1		0–2	1–3			0–0	

Source: RFDL , AIFF
Legend: Blue = home team win; Yellow = draw; Red = away team win.

==== Top scorers ====
Rank	Player	Club	Goals
1	Makakmayum Daniyal	South United	5
1	Sreekuttan MS	Kerala Blasters	5
3	Dinesh Singh Soubam	Sreenidi Deccan	4
4	Serto Worneilen Kom	Bengaluru	3
4	R Lawmnasangzuala	Sreenidi Deccan	3
4	Md Altab Hussain	South United	3
4	Vivek KS	Real Malabar	3
4	Md Arshad	PFC Kerala	3

==== Clean sheets ====
Rank	Player	Club	Clean sheets
1	Shuhaid Koya Thangal	Sreenidi Deccan	3
2	Alsabith ST	Kerala Blasters	2
3	Saviyol Varghese	Real Malabar	1
3	Mohamed Fayiz	PFC Kerala	1

=== Group B ===
Pos	Team	Pld	W	D	L	GF	GA	GD	Pts	Qualification	SESA	FCG	DEM	RFYC	ORA	CFCI
1	SESA	5	4	1	0	9	1	+8	13	Advance to National group stage		2–1				
2	FC Goa	5	3	1	1	7	4	+3	10	Advance to National group stage			2–1			
3	Dempo	5	2	1	2	11	4	+7	7	Advance to National group stage	0–1					
4	RF Young Champs	5	1	3	1	5	4	+1	6		0–0	1–3	1–1			3–0
5	Maharashtra Oranje	5	1	1	3	3	6	−3	4		0–2	0–1	0–3	0–0		
6	Community FC India	5	0	1	4	0	16	−16	1		0–4	0–0	0–6		0–3	

Source: RFDL , AIFF
Legend: Blue = home team win; Yellow = draw; Red = away team win.

=== Group C ===
Pos	Team	Pld	W	D	L	GF	GA	GD	Pts	Qualification	PFC	SUD	NEUTD	CFA	RUFC	ASU
1	Punjab	5	4	1	0	13	2	+11	13	Advance to National group stage						
2	Sudeva Delhi	5	3	1	1	11	7	+4	10 (Note: Head-to-head points: Delhi 3, NEUTD 0)	Advance to National group stage	1–3		2–1		1–1	
3	North East United	5	3	1	1	14	5	+9	10	Advance to National group stage	0–0					3–0
4	Classic FA	5	2	0	3	3	9	−6	6		1–2	0–3	0–4			1–0
5	Rangdajied United	5	1	1	3	6	9	−3	4		0–1		3–6	0–1		2–0
6	Asufii FA	5	0	0	5	2	17	−15	0		0–7	2–4				

Source: RFDL , AIFF
Legend: Blue = home team win; Yellow = draw; Red = away team win.

=== Group D ===
Pos	Team	Pld	W	D	L	GF	GA	GD	Pts	Qualification	DHB	EAB	MBSG	BMSA	RUFC	USC
1	Diamond Harbour	5	4	1	0	10	2	+8	13	Advance to National group stage		1–0		3–0	3–1	2–0
2	East Bengal	5	4	0	1	11	3	+8	12	Advance to National group stage					1–0	6–2
3	Mohun Bagan	5	2	2	1	8	5	+3	8	Advance to National group stage	1–1	0–1				2–2
4	Bidhannagar MSA	5	2	0	3	3	9	−6	6			0–3	0–2		2–1	
5	Rajasthan United	5	1	0	4	6	9	−3	3				1–3			3–0
6	United SC	5	0	1	4	4	14	−10	1					0–1		

Source: RFDL
Legend: Blue = home team win; Yellow = draw; Red = away team win.

== National group stage ==
A total of twelve teams progressed to the National group stage from zonal stage.

=== Group A ===
Pos	Team	Pld	W	D	L	GF	GA	GD	Pts	Qualification	BFC	FCG	SUD	MBG	SRE	DHB
1	Bengaluru	10	5	4	1	17	8	+9	19	Advance to National Championship		1–1	0–2	0–0	6–2	1–1
2	Goa	10	4	2	4	10	11	−1	14	Advance to National Championship	0–2		1–0	1–0	1–3	1–3
3	Sudeva Delhi	10	4	2	4	13	16	−3	14		0–3	0–0		3–2	1–3	1–1
4	Mohun Bagan	10	3	4	3	10	7	+3	13		0–1	1–0	2–0		2–2	0–0
5	Sreenidi Deccan	10	3	3	4	21	23	−2	12		2–2	0–2	2–3	0–3		4–0
6	Diamond Harbour	10	1	5	4	11	17	−6	8		0–1	1–3	2–3	0–0	3–3	

Source: RFDL
Legend: Blue = home team win; Yellow = draw; Red = away team win.

=== Group B ===
Pos	Team	Pld	W	D	L	GF	GA	GD	Pts	Qualification	PFC	KBFC	DSC	SESA	NEUTD	EBFC
1	Punjab	10	7	2	1	22	9	+13	23	Advance to National Championship		1–2	3–0	2–0	2–2	4–2
2	Kerala Blasters	10	7	2	1	19	10	+9	23	Advance to National Championship	0–1		3–2	2–0	3–2	1–1
3	Dempo	10	4	3	3	11	12	−1	15		0–2	1–1		2–0	1–0	2–1
4	SESA	10	2	3	5	9	15	−6	9		1–1	1–2	0–0		3–2	1–1
5	North East United	10	2	2	6	13	21	−8	8		1–4	3–0	1–1	2–1		2–0
6	East Bengal	10	1	2	7	11	18	−7	5		1–2	1–2	1–2	1–2	3–1	

Source: RFDL
Legend: Blue = home team win; Yellow = draw; Red = away team win.

== National Championship ==
=== Qualification ===
Club	Qualified as
Bengaluru FC	Group A Champions
Punjab FC	Group B Champions
FC Goa	Group A Runners-up
Kerala Blasters FC	Group B Runners-up

- Top 3 teams from this stage will qualify for Next Gen Cup.

=== Bracket ===
All matches to be played at GMC Athletic Stadium, Bambolim, Goa.

Semifinals
A1	Bengaluru FC	7	3	10
B2	Kerala Blasters	0	0	0
B1	Punjab FC	0	2	2
A2	FC Goa	4	1	5

Final
SF1W	Bengaluru FC	1
SF2W	FC Goa	0
Third place
SF1L	Kerala Blasters	0
SF2L	Punjab FC	6

=== Semi-finals 1st legs ===
12 April 2026
08:00 IST

Bengaluru FC	7–0	Kerala Blasters
Kom 10', 34'; Adil 24'; Abhilash 29'; Anil 72'; Subba 75'; Aheibam 81'	Report

GMC Athletic Stadium, Goa
Referee: Manvir Singh Kalyan
12 April 2026
16:00 IST

Punjab	0–4	Goa
	Report	35' Rodrigues; 56' Gaonkar; 60' Konsam; 70' Ismail

GMC Athletic Stadium, Goa
Referee: Abdul Majid Choudhury

=== Semi-finals 2nd legs ===
15 April 2026
08:00 IST

Kerala Blasters	0–3	Bengaluru FC
	Report	10', 14' Kom; 22' Adhikari

GMC Athletic Stadium, Goa
Referee: Manvir Singh Kalyan
15 April 2026
16:00 IST

Goa	1–2	Punjab
Katkar 24'	Report	2' Yadav; 83' Konsam

GMC Athletic Stadium, Goa
Referee: Vivek Chhetri

=== Third-place play-off ===
18 April 2026
08:00 IST

Kerala Blasters	0–6	Punjab FC
Baiju (yellow card) 10'; Adnan (yellow card) 21'; Sharma (yellow card) 50'; Rajeev (yellow card) 56'; Khurshid (yellow card) 79'; Daniyal (yellow card) 90+5'	Report	6' Sahil; 9', 26' A. Singh; 34' B. Singh; 57', 65' Konsam; (yellow card) 71' Meitei; (yellow card) 79' Thounaojam

GMC Athletic Stadium, Goa
Referee: Vivek Chhetri

=== Final ===
18 April 2026
16:00 IST

Bengaluru FC	1–0	FC Goa
Samson (yellow card) 10'; Meetei 81'; K. Singh (yellow card) 90+1'	Report	(yellow card) 84' Fernandes

GMC Athletic Stadium, Goa

== Final standing ==
Final standing of 2026 Reliance Foundation Development League
Rank	Team	Pld	W	D	L	GF	GA	GD	Pts
1st place, gold medalist(s)	Bengaluru FC	23	16	4	3	56	17	+39	52
2nd place, silver medalist(s)	FC Goa	23	11	4	8	31	23	+8	37
3rd place, bronze medalist(s)	Punjab FC	23	17	3	2	60	18	+42	54
4	Kerala Blasters	23	12	3	7	41	35	+6	39
Eliminated in the National group stage
5	Dempo SC	20	11	4	5	36	16	+20	37
6	Sudeva Delhi	20	10	4	6	38	30	+8	34
7	Mohun Bagan	20	9	6	5	35	14	+21	33
8	Sreenidi Deccan	20	9	5	6	43	32	+11	32
9	SESA	20	9	5	6	30	20	+10	32
10	Diamond Harbour	20	8	6	6	30	22	+8	30
11	NorthEast United	20	8	5	7	49	29	+20	29
12	East Bengal	20	9	2	9	36	23	+13	29
Eliminated in the Zonal group stage
13	South United	10	6	1	3	30	21	+9	19
14	RF Young Champs	10	5	4	1	14	5	+9	19
15	PFC Kerala	10	6	1	3	14	13	+1	19
16	Bidhannagar Municipal SA	10	5	2	3	18	14	+4	17
17	Rangdajied United	10	4	3	3	17	14	+3	15
18	Classic FA	10	4	3	3	10	13	-3	15
19	Rajasthan United	10	3	2	5	17	21	-4	11
20	Real Malabar FC	10	3	2	5	11	19	-8	11
21	Maharashtra Oranje	10	4	2	4	14	9	+5	10
22	Asufii FA	10	3	1	6	17	25	-8	10
23	Community FC India	10	3	1	6	7	24	-17	10
24	United SC	10	2	2	6	9	25	-16	8
Eliminated in the Regional qualifiers
25	Jamshedpur FC (Note: Qualified but withdrew from Zonal group stage.)	5	4	0	1	38	3	+35	12
26	Langsning SC	5	3	1	1	15	8	+7	10
27	Zinc FA	5	2	2	1	10	5	+5	8
28	Subansiri United FC	5	2	2	1	6	5	+1	8
29	SC Delhi	5	2	1	2	8	6	+2	7
30	Shillong Lajong	5	2	0	3	13	9	+4	6
31	Kerala United	5	2	0	3	11	7	+4	6
32	Salgaocar FC	5	2	0	3	8	9	-1	6
33	SAI RC	5	2	0	3	9	11	-2	6
34	Chhayagaon FC	5	2	0	3	6	9	-3	6
35	Sports Odisha	5	2	0	3	10	16	-6	6
36	Football 4 Change	5	1	2	2	20	18	+2	5
37	MYJ-GSM	5	1	1	3	7	8	-1	4
38	Greenfield FA	5	1	1	3	7	8	-1	4
39	Millat FC	5	1	1	3	7	11	-4	4
40	SAI Kollam	5	1	1	3	4	10	-6	4
41	Downtown Heroes	5	1	1	3	5	13	-8	4
42	Kickstart FC	5	1	1	3	4	18	-14	4
43	Alchemy FA	5	1	0	4	5	11	-6	3
44	SC de Goa	5	1	0	4	5	14	-9	3
45	Iron Born FC	5	1	0	4	5	15	-10	3
46	Victoria SC	5	1	0	4	3	16	-13	3
47	Imphal Youth	5	0	2	3	5	11	-6	2
48	Roots	5	0	1	4	2	15	-13	1
49	Inter Kashi	5	0	1	4	3	17	-14	1
50	IFA Bengal Future Champs	5	0	1	4	2	16	-14	1
51	Kovalam	5	0	0	5	1	14	-13	0
52	Churchill Brothers	5	0	0	5	2	18	-16	0
53	4 For All FA	5	0	0	5	3	38	-35	0
54	Chhatisgarh United	5	0	0	5	4	50	-46	0

== See also ==
- 2025–26 AIFF Elite Youth League
- 2025–26 Indian Super League
- 2025–26 Indian Women's League
- 2025–26 Indian Football League
- 2025–26 Indian State Leagues
