= 2024–25 Indian Youth League =

U17 football league in India

Youth League
- Season: 2024–25
- Dates: 4 January 2025 – 14 May 2025
- Champions: Punjab FC (1st title)
- Matches: 368
- Goals: 1,515 (4.12 per match)
- Top goalscorer: Mohammed Shamil VPP (FC Madras) (21 goals)
- Biggest home win: Raman Sports Academy 15–0 Artz N India Football Club (10 January 2025)
- Biggest away win: Delhi FC 0-17 Minerva Academy (16 January 2025)
- Highest scoring: Delhi FC 0-17 Minerva Academy (16 January 2025)

The 2024–25 Youth League, also known as the 2024–25 U-17 Youth League, is the fifteenth season of the Indian Youth League and the third season of the under-17 category.

== Changes in format ==
- Number of participating teams increased to 71.
- The teams were divided into 12 groups.
  - All except group J had 6 teams.
- The tournament took place in home and away round-robin format (except in centralized groups J and L) in the group stage.

== Teams ==
Club	State/Region	Home
Group A
Adamas United Sports Academy	West Bengal	Barakpore Stadium, Kolkata
Bengal Football Academy	West Bengal	Vivekanand Stadium, Khardaha
Bidhannagar Municipal Sports Academy	West Bengal	Bidhannagar Municipal Sports Academy Ground, Kolkata
East Bengal FC	West Bengal	East Bengal Ground, Kolkata
Mohammedan SC	West Bengal	Mohammedan Sporting Ground, Kolkata
Mohun Bagan SG	West Bengal	Mohun Bagan Ground, Kolkata
Group B
Mumbai City FC	Maharashtra	Cooperage Ground, Churchgate, Mumbai
Reliance Foundation Young Champs	Maharashtra	Reliance Corporate Park, Ghansoli, Navi Mumbai
Community Football Club	Maharashtra	Neville D'Souza Ground, Bandra
SSE BFC Soccer Schools	Maharashtra	Yashwantrao Ground, Nerul
Brothers Sports Association	Maharashtra	Barnes School and Junior College, Nashik
Thane City FC	Maharashtra	All Saints Ground, Bhiwandi
Group C
Altius International Football Academy	Kerala	Altius International Football Academy, Koppam, Pattambi
MSP Football Academy	Kerala	Kottappadi Football Stadium, Malappuram
Parappur FC	Kerala	Thrissur Cooperation Stadium, Thrissur
Don Bosco Vaduthala	Kerala	Maharaja's College Ground, Kochi
Gokulam Kerala FC	Kerala	EMS Corporation Stadium, Kozhikode
Kerala Blasters Football Club	Kerala	Panampilly Sports Ground, Panampilly
Group D
Artz N India Football Club	Tamil Nadu	SDAT Ground, Dindigul
Chennaiyin FC	Tamil Nadu	Sri Ramachandra Medical College, Porur, Chennai
FC Madras	Tamil Nadu	FC Madras Academy, Mahabalipuram
First Kick School of Soccer Academy	Tamil Nadu	First Kick School of Soccer, Coimbatore
BBFS, Bengaluru	Karnataka	Maharishi Vidya Mandir School, Hosur, Tamil Nadu
Raman Sports Academy	Karnataka	Padukone Dravid Center of Excellence, Bengaluru
Group E
Alchemy International FA	Karnataka	Padukone Dravid Centre for Sports Excellence, Bengaluru
Bengaluru FC	Karnataka	Padukone Dravid Centre for Sports Excellence, Bengaluru
Kickstart FC	Karnataka	Bangalore Football Stadium, Bengaluru
Roots Football Club	Karnataka	HAL Sports Club, Bengaluru
Sporting Club Bengaluru	Karnataka	Padukone Dravid Centre for Sports Excellence, Bengaluru
Muthoot Football Academy	Kerala	Muthoot FA, Malappuram
Group F
Minerva Academy	Punjab	Minerva Academy, Mohali
Punjab FC	Punjab	SUS Tangori Football Ground, Mohali
Sri Dashmesh Martial Sports Academy	Punjab	Sri Dashmesh Martial SA, Anandpur Sahib
BBFS, Delhi	Delhi	Vedas International School, Sohna, Haryana
Delhi FC	Delhi	Minerva Academy, Mohali
Sudeva Delhi FC	Delhi	Sudeva Football Academy, Delhi
Group G
NorthEast United	Assam	MFA turf, Shillong, Meghalaya
Numaligarh Refinery Limited Football Academy	Assam	NRL Township Ground, Numaligarh
ASUFII FA	Manipur	KASA Stadium, Diphu, Assam
Football 4 Change Academy	Manipur	Assam Rifles Ground, Laitkor, Shillong, Meghalaya
BBFS, Shillong	Meghalaya	Assam Rifles Ground, Laitkor, Shillong, Meghalaya
Shillong Lajong	Meghalaya	MFA turf, Shillong
Group H
Rajasthan United	Rajasthan	LIET, Alwar
Zinc Football Academy	Rajasthan	Debari, Udaipur
ARA FC	Gujarat	Adani Shantigram Football Ground, Ahmedabad
Charutar Vidya Mandal FC	Gujarat	CVM FC Ground, Anand
Oranje FC	Maharashtra	CIDCO, Kharghar
Sports Mania	Maharashtra	Sports Mania, Pimpri-Chinchwad
Group I
Churchill Brothers FC	Goa	Holy Trinity Ground, Benaulim
Dempo SC	Goa	Ella Ground, Old Goa
FC Goa	Goa	Monte de Guirim Football Ground, Guirim
Sesa Football Academy	Goa	SFA, Sircaim
Belgaum United Football Academy	Karnataka	Sporting Planet Sports Complex, Belgaum
Football Club Mangalore	Karnataka	FC Mangalore ground, Mangaluru
Group J
Classic Football Academy	Manipur	Ramakrishna Mission Sports Complex, Narayanpur, Chhattisgarh
TYDA	Manipur	Ramakrishna Mission Sports Complex, Narayanpur, Chhattisgarh
Aizawl FC	Mizoram	Ramakrishna Mission Sports Complex, Narayanpur, Chhattisgarh
RKM FA	Chhattisgarh	Ramakrishna Mission Sports Complex, Narayanpur, Chhattisgarh
Premier Sporting Football Academy	Bihar	Ramakrishna Mission Sports Complex, Narayanpur, Chhattisgarh
Group K
AIFF FIFA Talent Academy	Odisha	OSAP 7th Battalion, Bhubaneswar
Odisha FC	Odisha	SAI International Residential School, Nuagan, Cuttack
SKM Sports Foundation	West Bengal	Aghornath Park Stadium, Kalna
United SC	West Bengal	Naihati Stadium, Kolkata
Inter Kashi	Uttar Pradesh	BLW Football Ground, Varanasi
Jamshedpur	Jharkhand	JRD Tata Sports Complex, Jamshedpur
Group L
Corbett FC	Uttarakhand	Deccan Arena, Hyderabad, Telangana
Juba Sangha FC	Delhi	Deccan Arena, Hyderabad, Telangana
Madan Maharaj	Madhya Pradesh	Deccan Arena, Hyderabad, Telangana
MUM - Dsouza Football Academy	Maharashtra	Deccan Arena, Hyderabad, Telangana
Real Kashmir	Jammu and Kashmir	Deccan Arena, Hyderabad, Telangana
Sreenidi Deccan	Telangana	Deccan Arena, Hyderabad, Telangana

== Group stage ==
=== Group A ===
Pos	Team	Pld	W	D	L	GF	GA	GD	Pts	Qualification	MBSG	BFA	EBFC	AUSA	MSC	BMSA
1	Mohun Bagan SG	10	9	1	0	24	3	+21	28	Final round		1–0	1–0	1–0	2–1	3–2
2	Bengal Football Academy	10	8	0	2	27	7	+20	24	Playoff round	0–1		5–0	5–1	3–0	2–0
3	East Bengal FC	10	4	2	4	15	16	−1	14		0–0	1–5		1–2	3–2	2–0
4	Adamas United Sports Academy	10	2	3	5	7	16	−9	9		0–1	2–3	0–4		0–0	1–0
5	Mohammedan SC	10	2	2	6	8	19	−11	8		0–5	0–1	0–3	1–1		2–1
6	Bidhannagar Municipal Sports Academy	10	0	2	8	5	25	−20	2		0–9	1–3	1–1	0–0	0–2	

Source: AIFF

=== Group B ===
Pos	Team	Pld	W	D	L	GF	GA	GD	Pts	Qualification	RFYC	MCFC	BSA	SBSS	CFCI	TCFC
1	Reliance Foundation Young Champs	10	9	0	1	48	5	+43	27	Final round		2–0	6–0	8–0	3–0	10–0
2	Mumbai City FC	10	8	1	1	32	4	+28	25	Playoff round	3–0		3–0	5–0	2–0	7–0
3	Brothers Sports Association	10	4	2	4	19	19	0	14		0–1	2–2		2–2	4–0	4–1
4	SSE BFC Soccer Schools	10	3	2	5	9	29	−20	11		0–6	0–5	3–1		0–1	1–0
5	Community Football Club	10	3	1	6	11	23	−12	10		1–7	0–1	1–4	0–0		2–1
6	Thane City FC	10	0	0	10	5	44	−39	0		1–5	0–4	0–2	1–3	1–6	

Source: AIFF

=== Group C ===
Pos	Team	Pld	W	D	L	GF	GA	GD	Pts	Qualification	KBFC	GOK	MSP	AIFA	PFCK	DBV
1	Kerala Blasters	10	9	1	0	45	7	+38	28	Final round		1–0	7–2	3–0	2–0	8–1
2	Gokulam Kerala	10	7	1	2	38	7	+31	22	Playoff round	2–3		1–1	7–1	6–0	8–0
3	MSP Football Academy	10	6	2	2	38	23	+15	20		2–2	1–7		4–1	3–2	3–1
4	Altius International Football Academy	10	3	0	7	14	42	−28	9		0–6	0–4	2–8		2–0	2–1
5	Parappur FC	10	2	1	7	15	26	−11	7		0–4	0–1	0–4	6–2		7–2
6	Don Bosco Vaduthala	10	0	1	9	8	53	−45	1		0–9	0–2	0–10	3–4	0–0	

Source: AIFF

=== Group D ===
Pos	Team	Pld	W	D	L	GF	GA	GD	Pts	Qualification	FCM	CFC	RSA	FKSSA	BBFS-B	AIFC
1	FC Madras	10	9	1	0	64	3	+61	28	Final round		1–0	9–0	4–0	15–1	10–0
2	Chennaiyin FC	10	8	1	1	51	5	+46	25	Playoff round	1–1		5–0	5–0	11–0	9–0
3	Raman Sports Academy	10	6	0	4	43	28	+15	18		1–7	3–4		6–0	2–0	15–0
4	First Kick School of Soccer Academy	10	3	1	6	14	27	−13	10		0–3	0–4	2–3		2–1	6–0
5	BBFS Bengaluru	10	2	1	7	10	46	−36	7		0–4	0–3	0–3	1–1		3–2
6	Artz N India Football Club	10	0	0	10	6	79	−73	0		0–10	0–9	1–10	0–3	3–4	

Source: AIFF

=== Group E ===
Pos	Team	Pld	W	D	L	GF	GA	GD	Pts	Qualification	MFA	AIA	BFC	KFK	RFC	SCB
1	Muthoot Football Academy	10	8	1	1	36	8	+28	25	Final round		1–1	2–1	4–2	13–0	4–0
2	Alchemy International FA	10	6	3	1	17	9	+8	21	Playoff round	1–0		1–5	1–0	4–1	2–0
3	Bengaluru FC	10	6	1	3	32	12	+20	19		2–3	0–0		0–1	6–3	6–0
4	Kickstart FC	10	5	1	4	16	12	+4	16		1–2	1–1	1–4		3–0	2–0
5	Roots Football Club	10	2	0	8	10	40	−30	6		0–4	0–2	1–5	0–3		3–0
6	Sporting Club Bengaluru	10	0	0	10	1	31	−30	0		0–3	1–4	0–3	0–2	0–2	

Source: AIFF

=== Group F ===
Pos	Team	Pld	W	D	L	GF	GA	GD	Pts	Qualification	PFC	SUD	MAFC	SDMSA	BBFS-D	DFC
1	Punjab FC	10	7	2	1	40	4	+36	23	Final round		0–1	1–1	1–1	1–0	9–0
2	Sudeva Delhi FC	10	7	1	2	30	5	+25	22	Playoff round	0–2		1–2	3–0	4–0	12–0
3	Minerva Academy	10	6	2	2	40	12	+28	20		0–4	0–0		1–0	5–0	8–0
4	Sri Dashmesh Martial Sports Academy	10	5	1	4	17	15	+2	16		0–3	0–2	4–3		3–0	4–1
5	BBFS, Delhi	10	2	0	8	10	29	−19	6		1–9	1–2	2–3	1–2		4–0
6	Delhi FC	10	0	0	10	1	73	−72	0		0–10	0–5	0–17	0–3	0–1	

Source: AIFF

=== Group G ===
Pos	Team	Pld	W	D	L	GF	GA	GD	Pts	Qualification	NEU	F4C	ASU	SHI	BBFS-S	NRL
1	NorthEast United	10	7	2	1	19	5	+14	23	Final round		3–1	4–2	0–1	2–0	6–0
2	Football 4 Change Academy	10	6	1	3	24	10	+14	19	Playoff round	1–1		1–2	2–1	1–2	5–0
3	ASUFII FA	10	6	1	3	21	15	+6	19		0–1	1–2		4–4	2–0	5–1
4	Shillong Lajong	10	4	2	4	16	15	+1	14		0–1	0–2	1–2		3–1	1–0
5	BBFS, Shillong	10	2	2	6	12	18	−6	8		0–1	0–3	1–2	3–3		4–0
6	Numaligarh Refinery Limited Football Academy	10	0	2	8	2	31	−29	2		0–0	0–6	0–1	0–2	1–1	

Source: AIFF

=== Group H ===
Pos	Team	Pld	W	D	L	GF	GA	GD	Pts	Qualification	ZFA	SM	RUFC	ARA	MOFC	CVM
1	Zinc Football Academy	10	10	0	0	29	4	+25	30	Final round		3–0	3–1	2–0	2–0	7–1
2	Sports Mania	10	6	1	3	11	12	−1	19	Playoff round	1–4		0–0	2–1	2–1	1–2
3	Rajasthan United	10	5	2	3	17	6	+11	17		0–1	0–1		3–0	1–1	3–0
4	ARA FC	10	3	0	7	8	16	−8	9		0–2	1–2	0–3		1–0	1–0
5	Oranje FC	10	2	1	7	9	18	−9	7		1–2	0–1	0–1	1–0		0–5
6	Charutar Vidya Mandal FC	10	2	0	8	12	30	−18	6		0–3	0–1	0–5	1–4	3–5	

Source: AIFF

=== Group I ===
Pos	Team	Pld	W	D	L	GF	GA	GD	Pts	Qualification	FCG	FCM	DEM	SESA	BUFA	CHB
1	FC Goa	10	5	4	1	30	14	+16	19	Final round		4–0	1–1	2–2	3–2	9–1
2	Football Club Mangalore	10	5	3	2	20	10	+10	18	Playoff round	3–1		2–1	2–3	2–1	6–0
3	Dempo SC	10	3	6	1	16	11	+5	15		2–2	0–0		1–1	2–2	2–1
4	Sesa Football Academy	10	4	3	3	16	12	+4	15		1–3	0–0	0–1		0–2	4–1
5	Belgaum United Football Academy	10	3	4	3	24	12	+12	13		2–2	0–0	1–1	0–1		7–0
6	Churchill Brothers FC	10	0	0	10	5	52	−47	0		0–3	0–5	1–5	0–4	1–7	

Source: AIFF

=== Group J ===
Pos	Team	Pld	W	D	L	GF	GA	GD	Pts	Qualification	CLA	RKM	TYDA	AIZ	PSFA
1	Classic Football Academy	4	4	0	0	13	1	+12	12	Final round		2–0		6–1	
2	RKM FA	4	2	1	1	4	4	0	7	Playoff round			1–0		
3	TYDA	4	2	0	2	10	5	+5	6		0–2			4–1	6–1
4	Aizawl FC	4	1	0	3	11	12	−1	3			1–2			8–0
5	Premier Sporting Football Academy	4	0	1	3	2	18	−16	1		0–3	1–1			

Source: AIFF

=== Group K ===
Pos	Team	Pld	W	D	L	GF	GA	GD	Pts	Qualification	AFTA	JAM	USC	OFC	SKM	IKA
1	AIFF FIFA Talent Academy	10	8	1	1	42	8	+34	25	Final round		7–0	6–0	7–1	6–1	5–1
2	Jamshedpur	10	8	0	2	37	12	+25	24	Playoff round	2–1		0–2	10–0	9–1	4–0
3	United SC	10	6	1	3	20	14	+6	19		1–2	0–5		4–0	5–0	2–1
4	Odisha FC	10	2	2	6	15	43	−28	8		2–6	0–2	0–5		3–3	5–3
5	SKM Sports Foundation	10	1	2	7	10	34	−24	5		0–2	0–2	0–0	1–2		1–5
6	Inter Kashi	10	1	2	7	13	26	−13	5		0–0	1–3	0–1	2–2	0–3	

Source: AIFF

=== Group L ===
Pos	Team	Pld	W	D	L	GF	GA	GD	Pts	Qualification	COR	SRD	JSFC	REK	MDFA	MMFC
1	Corbett FC	5	3	2	0	21	2	+19	11	Final round		1–1	0–0		4–0	
2	Sreenidi Deccan	5	3	1	1	10	7	+3	10	Playoff round			2–1		0–2	5–2
3	Juba Sangha FC	5	3	1	1	12	2	+10	10					5–0	2–0	
4	Real Kashmir	5	2	0	3	7	14	−7	6		1–7	1–2				
5	MUM - Dsouza Football Academy	5	1	0	4	3	11	−8	3					0–3		1–2
6	Madan Maharaj	5	1	0	4	4	21	−17	3		0–9		0–4	0–2		

Source: AIFF

== Playoff round ==
All matches will be played at centralized venues.

=== Playoff Group A ===
Pos	Team	Pld	W	D	L	GF	GA	GD	Pts	Qualification	SUD	RKM	GOK
1	Sudeva Delhi FC	2	2	0	0	6	1	+5	6	Final round		3–1	3–0
2	RKM FA	2	1	0	1	2	3	−1	3				
3	Gokulam Kerala	2	0	0	2	0	4	−4	0			0–1	

Updated to match(es) played on 27 April 2025. Source: AIFF

=== Playoff Group B ===
Pos	Team	Pld	W	D	L	GF	GA	GD	Pts	Qualification	BFA	SRD	AIA
1	Bengal Football Academy	2	1	1	0	5	4	+1	4	Final round		3–2	
2	Sreenidi Deccan	2	1	0	1	6	5	+1	3				4–2
3	Alchemy International FA	2	0	1	1	4	6	−2	1		2–2		

Updated to match(es) played on 27 April 2025. Source: AIFF

=== Playoff Group C ===
Pos	Team	Pld	W	D	L	GF	GA	GD	Pts	Qualification	FCM	CFC	SM
1	Football Club Mangalore	2	1	1	0	6	1	+5	4	Final round			5–0
2	Chennaiyin FC	2	1	1	0	5	1	+4	4		1–1		
3	Sports Mania	2	0	0	2	0	9	−9	0			0–4	

Updated to match(es) played on 27 April 2025. Source: AIFF

=== Playoff Group D ===
Pos	Team	Pld	W	D	L	GF	GA	GD	Pts	Qualification	JAM	F4C	MCFC
1	Jamshedpur	2	1	1	0	6	2	+4	4	Final round		2–2	
2	Football 4 Change Academy	2	1	1	0	5	3	+2	4				3–1
3	Mumbai City FC	2	0	0	2	1	7	−6	0		4–0		

Updated to match(es) played on 27 April 2025. Source: AIFF

== Final round ==
=== Final Group A ===
Pos	Team	Pld	W	D	L	GF	GA	GD	Pts	Qualification	AIFF	PUN	SUD	FCG
1	AIFF FIFA Talent Academy	3	2	1	0	11	9	+2	7	Knockout round		5–4		2–2
2	Punjab FC	3	2	0	1	15	5	+10	6	Knockout round			5–0	
3	Sudeva Delhi FC	3	1	0	2	6	11	−5	3		3–4			
4	FC Goa	3	0	1	2	4	11	−7	1			0–6	2–3	

Updated to match(es) played on 4 May 2025. Source: AIFF

=== Final Group B ===
Pos	Team	Pld	W	D	L	GF	GA	GD	Pts	Qualification	BFA	MBSG	RFYC	KBFC
1	Bengal Football Academy	3	3	0	0	8	1	+7	9	Knockout round			5–1	
2	Mohun Bagan SG	3	2	0	1	7	3	+4	6	Knockout round	0–2			4–0
3	RF Young Champs	3	1	0	2	4	8	−4	3			1–3		
4	Kerala Blasters FC	3	0	0	3	0	7	−7	0		0–1		0–2	

Updated to match(es) played on 6 May 2025. Source: AIFF

=== Final Group C ===
Pos	Team	Pld	W	D	L	GF	GA	GD	Pts	Qualification	NEU	FCM	ZIN	FKM
1	Northeast United	3	2	1	0	16	5	+11	7	Knockout round			2–2	9–1
2	FC Madras	3	2	0	1	14	6	+8	6	Knockout round	2–5		3–0	
3	Zinc Football Academy	3	1	1	1	4	5	−1	4					2–0
4	Football Club Mangalore	3	0	0	3	2	20	−18	0			1–9		

Updated to match(es) played on 4 May 2025. Source: AIFF

=== Final Group D ===
Pos	Team	Pld	W	D	L	GF	GA	GD	Pts	Qualification	MFA	JFC	CFC	CFA
1	Muthoot Football Academy	3	2	1	0	3	1	+2	7	Knockout round				1–0
2	Jamshedpur	3	1	1	1	3	3	0	4	Knockout round	0–1		1–0	
3	Corbett FC	3	1	1	1	2	2	0	4		1–1			1–0
4	Classic Football Academy	3	0	1	2	2	4	−2	1			2–2		

Updated to match(es) played on 4 May 2025. Source: AIFF

== Knockouts ==
=== Bracket ===
Quarterfinals
A1	AIFF FIFA Talent Academy	5
B2	Mohun Bagan SG	0
C1	Northeast United	1
D2	Jamshedpur	2
B1	Bengal Football Academy	2
A2	Punjab FC	6
D1	Muthoot Football Academy	0
C2	FC Madras	5

Semifinals
QF1	AIFF FIFA Talent Academy	0
QF2	Jamshedpur	5
QF3	Punjab FC	3
QF4	FC Madras	2

Finals
SF1	Jamshedpur	1
SF2	Punjab FC	4

=== Quarterfinals ===
8 May 2025
08:30 IST
QF 1

AIFF FIFA Talent Academy	5–0	Mohun Bagan
Tongbram Luxmikanta Singh 21', 56'; Thokchom Diamond Singh 82', 85'; Rahan Ahmed 87'; Malsawmtluanga (yellow card) 87'	Report; Summary

Indira Gandhi Athletic Stadium, Guwahati, Assam, India
Referee: Mechievilie Yashu

8 May 2025
15:30 IST
QF 2

Bengal Football Academy	2–6	Punjab
Tanbir Dey 10'; Karish Soram 57' (o.g.); Subhodeep Halder (yellow card) 80'; Subhodip Sardar (yellow card) 90+5'	Report; Summary	Vishal Yadav 9', 23'; Sameer 30', 70', 87'; Usham Thoungamba Singh 55'

Indira Gandhi Athletic Stadium, Guwahati, Assam, India
Referee: Bagavath Sundhar Jee S

9 May 2025
08:30 IST
QF 3

North East United	1–2	Jamshedpur
Dallalmuon Gangte 35'; Ngamgouhou Mate (yellow card) 48'	Report; Summary	Lawmsangzuala 47', 68'

Indira Gandhi Athletic Stadium, Guwahati, Assam, India
Referee: Mayank Pandey

9 May 2025
15:30 IST
QF 4

Muthoot Football Academy	0–5	FC Madras
	Report; Summary	Mugilan Krishnan 22'; Mohammed Hafeezun 32', 36'; Rajesh Raju 68'; Lalthlamuanpuia H 73' Mohammed Iqbal Shaikh (yellow card) 90+3'

Indira Gandhi Athletic Stadium, Guwahati, Assam, India
Referee: Debabrata Naskar

=== Semifinals ===
12 May 2025
08:30 IST
SF 1

AIFF FIFA Talent Academy	0–5	Jamshedpur
	Report; Summary	Gopal Munda 24'; Thingbaijam Sachin Singh 41'; R Vanlaltanpuia 46' (o.g.); Lawmsangzuala (yellow card) 54'; Mars Ningthoujam 77'; Heerangamba Seram 82' (yellow card) 51'

Indira Gandhi Athletic Stadium, Guwahati, Assam, India
Referee: Mechievilie Yashu

12 May 2025
15:30 IST
SF 2

Punjab	3–2	FC Madras
Ashish Lohar 11'; Vishal Yadav 47'; Thongram Rishikanta Singh 77'; Usham Thoungamba Singh (yellow card) 83'	Report; Summary	Mugilan Krishnan (yellow card) 15'; Mohammed Shamil Vpp 34', 45+2'

Indira Gandhi Athletic Stadium, Guwahati, Assam, India
Referee: Mayank Pandey

=== Finals ===
14 May 2025
15:00 IST
Final

Jamshedpur	1–4	Punjab
Heerangamba Seram 84'	Report; Summary	Karish Soram 28'; Ashish Lohar 34'; Vikash Kisku 37'; Usham Thoungamba Singh 39'

Indira Gandhi Athletic Stadium, Guwahati, Assam, India
Referee: Bagavath Sundhar Jee S

== Statistics ==
As of 14 May 2025

=== Top scorers ===
Rank	Player	Team	Goals
1	(India) Mohammed Shamil VPP	FC Madras	21
2	(India) Rakshit P Anil	Raman Sports Academy	19
2	(India) Potshangbam Abinash Singh	Chennaiyin FC	19
2	(India) Tanbir Dey	Bengal Football Academy	19
5	(India) Vishal Yadav	Punjab FC	17
6	(India) Hemneichung Lunkim	Minerva Academy	15
6	(India) Rahan Ahmed	AIFF FIFA Talent Academy	15
6	(India) Thokchom Diamond Singh	AIFF FIFA Talent Academy	15
6	(India) Mohammed Hafeezun	FC Madras	15
10	(India) Mohammed Nafin	MSP Football Academy	14

== See also ==
- 2025 Reliance Foundation Development League
