= 2025–26 AIFF Elite Youth League =

U18 football league in India

Youth League
- Season: 2025–26
- Dates: 1 October 2025 – 28 April 2026
- Champions: Punjab FC (2nd title)
- Matches: 530
- Goals: 2,153 (4.06 per match)
- Top goalscorer: Md Mahmad Sami(Sudeva Delhi) (34 goals)
- Biggest home win: Minerva Academy 13–0 Himalayan FC (31 January 2026)
- Biggest away win: Himachal FC 0–13 Punjab FC (28 November 2025)
- Highest scoring: Thadam FC 11–2 Sirukalathur Galatipet Football Club (14 October 2025); Minerva Academy 13–0 Himalayan FC (31 January 2026); Himachal FC 0–13 Punjab FC (28 November 2025)

The 2025–26 AIFF Elite Youth League, also known as the 2025–26 AIFF U-18 Elite League, was the sixteenth season of the Indian Youth League and marks a return to the under-18 category.

== Changes in format ==
- Number of participating teams increased to 121.
- Qualifier and pre-qualification rounds were added
- The zonal group stage was divided into 10 groups.
  - Groups B,E,G, and H had 8 teams each.
  - Group J had 6 teams.
  - The rest of the groups had 7 teams each.
- The tournament took place in home and away round-robin format.

== Teams ==
A total of 75 teams participated in the zonal group stage.

| Club | State/Region | Home |
Group A
| Corbett FC | Uttarakhand | Amenity Sports Complex, Rudrapur |
| Himachal FC | Himachal Pradesh | Minerva Academy, Mohali |
| Himalayan FC | Himachal Pradesh | Sri Dashmesh Martial SA, Anandpur Sahib |
| Minerva Academy | Punjab | Minerva Academy, Mohali |
| Punjab FC | Punjab | Roundglass Sports Academy, Mohali |
| Sri Dashmesh Martial Sports Academy | Punjab | Sri Dashmesh Martial SA, Anandpur Sahib |
| Real Kashmir | Jammu and Kashmir | TRC, Srinagar |
Group B
| Delhi FC | Delhi | Minerva Academy, Mohali |
| Juba Sangha FC | Delhi | Juba Sangh, Noida |
| Sudeva Delhi | Delhi | Sudeva Football Academy, Delhi |
| Lucknow Falcons Football Club (Note: The club withdrew from the competition during the zonal group stage.) | Uttar Pradesh | Ekana Sportz City Stadium, Lucknow |
| Techtro Lucknow FC | Uttar Pradesh | Techtro Football Arena, Lucknow |
| Lakecity FC | Madhya Pradesh | Delhi Public School, Bhopal |
| Rajasthan United | Rajasthan | Vidhyadhar Nagar Stadium, Jaipur |
| Zinc Football Academy | Rajasthan | Zawar Mine Stadium, Zawar |
Group C
| ARA FC | Gujarat | Adani Shantigram Ground, Ahmedabad |
| SGVP Football Club, Junagadh | Gujarat | SGVP Ground, Ahmedabad |
| MUM-Dsouza Football Academy | Maharashtra | Reliance Corporate park, Mumbai |
| Pune-UKM Kothrud FC | Maharashtra | Ganga Legend, Bavdhan, Pune |
| Reliance Foundation Young Champs | Maharashtra | Reliance Corporate park, Mumbai |
| Sports Mania | Maharashtra | Sports Mania Ground, Pimpri-Chinchwad |
| SSE BFC Soccer Schools, Mumbai | Maharashtra | Cooperage Ground, Mumbai |
Group D
| Churchill Brothers | Goa | Utorda Sports Complex, Utorda |
| Dempo SC | Goa | Dempo Academy, Gandaulim |
| FC Goa | Goa | Monte de Guirim Ground, Guirim |
| Guardian Angel SC | Goa | Nagoa Football Ground, Nagoa |
| Sesa Football Academy | Goa | SFA, Sircaim |
| South Goa United Club of Sports & Culture | Goa | Don Bosco Ground, Fatorda |
| Football Club Mangalore | Karnataka | Yenepoya University, Mangalore |
Group E
| AC Milan Academy Kerala | Kerala | BBM Spotland 11-a-side Turf, Kozhikode |
| Gokulam Kerala | Kerala | Kottappadi Football Stadium, Malappuram |
| Kerala Blasters | Kerala | TMK Arena, Wadakkancherry |
| Muthoot Football Academy | Kerala | Muthoot FA, Malappuram |
| Alchemy International FA | Karnataka | Padukone Dravid Centre for Sports Excellence, Bengaluru |
| Bengaluru FC | Karnataka | Centre of Excellence, Bengaluru |
| Kickstart FC | Karnataka | Kickstart Kannuru Ground, Bengaluru |
| South United FC | Karnataka | SUFC Ground, Bengaluru |
Group F
| FC Madras | Tamil Nadu | FC Madras Academy, Mahabalipuram |
| FC Marina Academy, Chennai | Tamil Nadu | FC Marina Centre for Excellence, Chennai |
| FC Tamilions | Tamil Nadu | Home Game Sports Arena, Chennai |
| Murugappa Youth Football Academy | Tamil Nadu | Murugappa Sports Centre, Chennai |
| Thadam FC | Tamil Nadu | Vinayaka Mission Research Foundation Ground, Chennai |
| LFP Football Academie | Pondicherry | Home Game Sports Arena, Chennai |
| Sreenidi Deccan | Telangana | Deccan Arena, Hyderabad |
Group G
| AIFF Bhubaneswar Academy (Note: The club withdrew from the competition during the zonal group stage.) | Odisha | Odisha Football Academy, Bhubaneshwar |
| FAO Academy | Odisha | 7th Battalion Ground, Bhubaneswar |
| YAFC,Choudwar | Odisha | Capital Ground, Bhubaneswar |
| Alpha Sports Academy (Note: The club withdrew from the competition during the zonal group stage.) | Bihar | Alpha Sports Academy, Patna |
| Inter Kashi | Uttar Pradesh | BLW Inter College Football Ground, Varanasi |
| Jamshedpur FC | Jharkhand | Flatlets, Jameshpur FC, Jamshedpur |
| SAIL Football Academy, Bokaro | Jharkhand | Mohan Kumar Mangalam Stadium, Bokaro |
| RKM Football Academy | Chhattisgarh | RKM Football Academy, Narayanpur |
Group H
| AIFF FIFA Talent Academy (Note: The club withdrew from the competition during the zonal group stage.) | Odisha | Odisha Football Academy, Bhubaneshwar |
| Diamond Harbour | West Bengal | Bidhannagar Municipality Sports Complex, Kolkata |
| East Bengal FC | West Bengal | East Bengal Ground, Kolkata |
| Keshab-Uma Charitable Trust FA (Note: The club withdrew from the competition during the zonal group stage.) | West Bengal | Gangadharpur College Ground, Howrah |
| Mohammedan | West Bengal | Mohammedan Sporting Ground, Kolkata |
| Mohun Bagan | West Bengal | Mohun Bagan Ground, Kolkata |
| SKM Sports Foundation | West Bengal | Aghornath Park Stadium, Kalna |
| United SC | West Bengal | Kalyani B Stadium, Kalyani |
Group I
| ASUFII FA | Manipur | ASUFII FAI FA Ground, Senapati |
| Football 4 Change Academy | Manipur | Senapati Multi Purpose Ground, Senapati |
| Lamka FA | Manipur | Senapati Multi Purpose Ground, Senapati |
| Pehlum Lamhil Lawm | Manipur | ASUFII FAI FA Ground, Senapati |
| KASA Football Coaching Center | Assam | Karbi Anglong Stadium, Karbi Anglong |
| NorthEast United | Assam | Indira Gandhi Athletic Stadium, Guwahati |
| Shillong Lajong | Meghalaya | SSA Stadium, Shillong |
Group J
| Classic Football Academy | Manipur | Loitang Football Arena, Imphal |
| Elite FA | Manipur | St. Anthony School Ground, Imphal |
| Regular Football Coaching Center | Manipur | DSA Ground, Bishnupur |
| Sang-Gai Heroes | Manipur | Angtha WPC Ground, Imphal |
| TYDA | Manipur | TYDA Football Ground, Toubul |
| Numaligarh Refinery Limited Football Academy | Assam | NRL Township Ground, Numaligarh |

== Qualifier Round ==
=== Qualifier Group A ===
| Pos | Team | Pld | W | D | L | GF | GA | GD | Pts | Qualification | TLFC | LFFC | NUFC |
|---|---|---|---|---|---|---|---|---|---|---|---|---|---|
| 1 | Techtro Lucknow FC | 2 | 1 | 1 | 0 | 5 | 0 | +5 | 4 | Zonal Group Stage | | 0–0 | |
| 2 | Lucknow Falcons Football Club | 2 | 0 | 2 | 0 | 0 | 0 | 0 | 2 | Zonal Group Stage | | | 0–0 |
| 3 | Northern United Football Club | 2 | 0 | 1 | 1 | 0 | 5 | −5 | 1 | | 0–5 | | |

Source: AIFF

=== Qualifier Group B ===
| Pos | Team | Pld | W | D | L | GF | GA | GD | Pts | Qualification | ZFA | BBFSD | CONF |
|---|---|---|---|---|---|---|---|---|---|---|---|---|---|
| 1 | Zinc Football Academy | 2 | 2 | 0 | 0 | 8 | 0 | +8 | 6 | Zonal Group Stage | | 2–0 | |
| 2 | Bhaichung Bhutia Football Schools- Delhi | 2 | 1 | 0 | 1 | 7 | 3 | +4 | 3 | | | | |
| 3 | Conscient Football | 2 | 0 | 0 | 2 | 1 | 13 | −12 | 0 | | 0–6 | 1–7 | |

Source: AIFF

=== Qualifier Group C ===
| Pos | Team | Pld | W | D | L | GF | GA | GD | Pts | Qualification | SBSS | MSSA | HHSC | KENFC |
|---|---|---|---|---|---|---|---|---|---|---|---|---|---|---|
| 1 | SSE BFC Soccer Schools, Mumbai | 3 | 2 | 1 | 0 | 20 | 2 | +18 | 7 | Pre-qualification Round | | | | 7–0 |
| 2 | MUM-Somaiya Sports Academy | 3 | 2 | 1 | 0 | 12 | 2 | +10 | 7 | | 2–2 | | | |
| 3 | Hungry Hearts Soccer School | 3 | 1 | 0 | 2 | 3 | 18 | −15 | 3 | | 0–11 | 0–6 | | |
| 4 | Kenkre FC | 3 | 0 | 0 | 3 | 1 | 14 | −13 | 0 | | | 0–4 | 1–3 | |

Source: AIFF

=== Qualifier Group D ===
| Pos | Team | Pld | W | D | L | GF | GA | GD | Pts | Qualification | MOFC | SSFCA | TCFC |
|---|---|---|---|---|---|---|---|---|---|---|---|---|---|
| 1 | Maharashtra Oranje | 2 | 2 | 0 | 0 | 9 | 2 | +7 | 6 | Pre-qualification Round | | 2–1 | |
| 2 | Savvy Swaraaj FC, Ahmedabad | 2 | 1 | 0 | 1 | 7 | 3 | +4 | 3 | | | | 6–1 |
| 3 | Thane City FC | 2 | 0 | 0 | 2 | 2 | 13 | −11 | 0 | | 1–7 | | |

Source: AIFF

=== Qualifier Group E ===
| Pos | Team | Pld | W | D | L | GF | GA | GD | Pts | Qualification | BSA | CFCI | TSA |
|---|---|---|---|---|---|---|---|---|---|---|---|---|---|
| 1 | Brothers Sports Association | 2 | 2 | 0 | 0 | 5 | 1 | +4 | 6 | Pre-qualification Round | | | 2–0 |
| 2 | Community Football Club India | 2 | 1 | 0 | 1 | 11 | 4 | +7 | 3 | | 1–3 | | |
| 3 | The Soccer Academy | 2 | 0 | 0 | 2 | 1 | 12 | −11 | 0 | | | 1–10 | |

Source: AIFF

=== Qualifier Group F ===
| Pos | Team | Pld | W | D | L | GF | GA | GD | Pts | Qualification | MSP | BRAF | IRSC | CONM |
|---|---|---|---|---|---|---|---|---|---|---|---|---|---|---|
| 1 | Mumbai Soccer Prodigies | 3 | 1 | 2 | 0 | 8 | 6 | +2 | 5 | Pre-qualification Round | | 1–1 | 4–2 | |
| 2 | Bravo Football | 3 | 1 | 2 | 0 | 5 | 3 | +2 | 5 | | | | | 2–0 |
| 3 | India Rush Soccer Club | 3 | 0 | 2 | 1 | 4 | 6 | −2 | 2 | | | 2–2 | | 0–0 |
| 4 | Conscient Football Mumbai | 3 | 0 | 2 | 1 | 3 | 5 | −2 | 2 | | 3–3 | | | |

Source: AIFF

=== Qualifier Group G ===
| Pos | Team | Pld | W | D | L | GF | GA | GD | Pts | Qualification | SPFC | ADRS | PPFC |
|---|---|---|---|---|---|---|---|---|---|---|---|---|---|
| 1 | Snigmay Pune Football Club | 2 | 2 | 0 | 0 | 11 | 1 | +10 | 6 | Pre-qualification Round | | | 7–0 |
| 2 | Adrenaline Sports | 2 | 1 | 0 | 1 | 9 | 7 | +2 | 3 | | 1–4 | | |
| 3 | Pune Pioneers FC | 2 | 0 | 0 | 2 | 3 | 15 | −12 | 0 | | | 3–8 | |

Source: AIFF

=== Qualifier Group H ===
| Pos | Team | Pld | W | D | L | GF | GA | GD | Pts | Qualification | PUKFC | SFA | RPFC |
|---|---|---|---|---|---|---|---|---|---|---|---|---|---|
| 1 | Pune-UKM Kothrud FC | 2 | 1 | 1 | 0 | 4 | 1 | +3 | 4 | Pre-qualification Round | | | 4–1 |
| 2 | Sportiqo Football Academy | 2 | 0 | 2 | 0 | 1 | 1 | 0 | 2 | | 0–0 | | |
| 3 | Rising Pune FC | 2 | 0 | 1 | 1 | 2 | 5 | −3 | 1 | | | 1–1 | |

Source: AIFF

=== Qualifier Group K ===
| Pos | Team | Pld | W | D | L | GF | GA | GD | Pts | Qualification | PFCK | ACMK | KFTC | NFCK |
|---|---|---|---|---|---|---|---|---|---|---|---|---|---|---|
| 1 | PFC Kerala | 3 | 3 | 0 | 0 | 9 | 1 | +8 | 9 | Pre-qualification Round | | | | 2–1 |
| 2 | AC Milan Academy Kerala | 3 | 2 | 0 | 1 | 12 | 4 | +8 | 6 | Pre-qualification Round | 0–4 | | | 11–0 |
| 3 | KFTC Football Academy Kozhikode | 3 | 1 | 0 | 2 | 7 | 4 | +3 | 3 | | 0–3 | 0–1 | | |
| 4 | New Football Club Kerala | 3 | 0 | 0 | 3 | 1 | 20 | −19 | 0 | | | | 0–7 | |

Source: AIFF

=== Qualifier Group L ===
| Pos | Team | Pld | W | D | L | GF | GA | GD | Pts | Qualification | DBV | SSC | AIFA |
|---|---|---|---|---|---|---|---|---|---|---|---|---|---|
| 1 | Don Bosco Vaduthala | 2 | 2 | 0 | 0 | 4 | 2 | +2 | 6 | Pre-qualification Round | | 2–1 | |
| 2 | Sportto Soccer Club | 2 | 0 | 1 | 1 | 2 | 3 | −1 | 1 | | | | 1–1 |
| 3 | Altius International Football Academy | 2 | 0 | 1 | 1 | 2 | 3 | −1 | 1 | | 1–2 | | |

Source: AIFF

=== Qualifier Group N ===
| Pos | Team | Pld | W | D | L | GF | GA | GD | Pts | Qualification | RFC | TSS | SNIP |
|---|---|---|---|---|---|---|---|---|---|---|---|---|---|
| 1 | Roots Football Club | 2 | 1 | 0 | 1 | 6 | 3 | +3 | 3 | Pre-qualification Round | | 5–1 | |
| 2 | The Sports School | 2 | 1 | 0 | 1 | 4 | 5 | −1 | 3 | | | | 3–0 |
| 3 | Snipers Football Club | 2 | 1 | 0 | 1 | 2 | 4 | −2 | 3 | | 2–1 | | |

Source: AIFF

=== Qualifier Group O ===
| Pos | Team | Pld | W | D | L | GF | GA | GD | Pts | Qualification | BCFC | SUFC | RSA |
|---|---|---|---|---|---|---|---|---|---|---|---|---|---|
| 1 | Bangalore City FC | 2 | 1 | 1 | 0 | 3 | 2 | +1 | 4 | Pre-qualification Round | | | 1–1 |
| 2 | South United FC | 2 | 1 | 0 | 1 | 9 | 2 | +7 | 3 | Pre-qualification Round | 1–2 | | |
| 3 | Raman Sports Academy | 2 | 0 | 1 | 1 | 1 | 9 | −8 | 1 | | | 0–8 | |

Source: AIFF

=== Qualifier Group Q ===
| Pos | Team | Pld | W | D | L | GF | GA | GD | Pts | Qualification | THDFC | SGFC | FPPSA |
|---|---|---|---|---|---|---|---|---|---|---|---|---|---|
| 1 | Thadam FC | 2 | 2 | 0 | 0 | 12 | 0 | +12 | 6 | Pre-qualification Round | | 5–0 | |
| 2 | Sirukalathur Galatipet Football Club | 2 | 1 | 0 | 1 | 6 | 6 | 0 | 3 | Pre-qualification Round | | | 6–1 |
| 3 | Football Plus Professional Soccer Academy | 2 | 0 | 0 | 2 | 1 | 13 | −12 | 0 | | 0–7 | | |

Source: AIFF

=== Qualifier Group R ===
| Pos | Team | Pld | W | D | L | GF | GA | GD | Pts | Qualification | VFC | SPFA | PFCA |
|---|---|---|---|---|---|---|---|---|---|---|---|---|---|
| 1 | Vels Football Club | 2 | 2 | 0 | 0 | 7 | 0 | +7 | 6 | Pre-qualification Round | | | 6–0 |
| 2 | SP FOOTBALL ACADEMY | 2 | 1 | 0 | 1 | 3 | 3 | 0 | 3 | | 0–1 | | |
| 3 | Puzhal Football Coaching Association | 2 | 0 | 0 | 2 | 2 | 9 | −7 | 0 | | | 2–3 | |

Source: AIFF

=== Qualifier Group T ===
| Pos | Team | Pld | W | D | L | GF | GA | GD | Pts | Qualification | MYFA | RVSS | ANSS |
|---|---|---|---|---|---|---|---|---|---|---|---|---|---|
| 1 | Murugappa Youth Football Academy | 2 | 2 | 0 | 0 | 10 | 0 | +10 | 6 | Pre-qualification Round | | | 6–0 |
| 2 | Raman Vijayan Soccer School | 2 | 0 | 1 | 1 | 2 | 6 | −4 | 1 | | 0–4 | | |
| 3 | A & N Soccer School | 2 | 0 | 1 | 1 | 2 | 8 | −6 | 1 | | | 2–2 | |

Source: AIFF

=== Qualifier Group U ===
| Pos | Team | Pld | W | D | L | GF | GA | GD | Pts | Qualification | DBSSI | RFC | FKSSA |
|---|---|---|---|---|---|---|---|---|---|---|---|---|---|
| 1 | Dream Big Soccer School India, Karur | 2 | 1 | 0 | 1 | 6 | 3 | +3 | 3 | Pre-qualification Round | | | 4–0 |
| 2 | Reeds FC | 2 | 1 | 0 | 1 | 4 | 4 | 0 | 3 | Pre-qualification Round | 3–2 | | |
| 3 | First Kick School of Soccer Academy | 2 | 1 | 0 | 1 | 2 | 5 | −3 | 3 | | | 2–1 | |

Source: AIFF

=== Qualifier Group X ===
| Pos | Team | Pld | W | D | L | GF | GA | GD | Pts | Qualification | SKM | BMSA | BFA | IFSA |
|---|---|---|---|---|---|---|---|---|---|---|---|---|---|---|
| 1 | SKM Sports Foundation, Kalna | 3 | 1 | 2 | 0 | 7 | 4 | +3 | 5 | Zonal Group Stage | | 2–2 | 2–2 | |
| 2 | Bidhannagar Municipal Sports Academy | 3 | 1 | 2 | 0 | 6 | 5 | +1 | 5 | | | | | 2–2 |
| 3 | Bengal Football Academy | 3 | 1 | 1 | 1 | 8 | 5 | +3 | 4 | | | 1–2 | | |
| 4 | Infocus Sports Academy | 3 | 0 | 1 | 2 | 3 | 10 | −7 | 1 | | 0–3 | | 1–5 | |

Source: AIFF

=== Qualifier Group Y ===
| Pos | Team | Pld | W | D | L | GF | GA | GD | Pts | Qualification | F4C | PLL | BBFS-S | 4FA |
|---|---|---|---|---|---|---|---|---|---|---|---|---|---|---|
| 1 | Football 4 Change Academy | 3 | 2 | 1 | 0 | 9 | 4 | +5 | 7 | Zonal Group Stage | | 1–1 | | 5–1 |
| 2 | Pehlum Lamhil Lawm | 3 | 2 | 1 | 0 | 5 | 2 | +3 | 7 | Zonal Group Stage | | | 3–1 | |
| 3 | BBFS Shillong | 3 | 1 | 0 | 2 | 7 | 7 | 0 | 3 | | 2–3 | | | |
| 4 | 4 For All Football Academy | 3 | 0 | 0 | 3 | 2 | 10 | −8 | 0 | | | 0–1 | 1–4 | |

Source: AIFF

=== Qualifier Group Z ===
| Pos | Team | Pld | W | D | L | GF | GA | GD | Pts | Qualification | ASU | LAM | MUVA | SHFA | CHIK |
|---|---|---|---|---|---|---|---|---|---|---|---|---|---|---|---|
| 1 | ASUFII FA | 4 | 4 | 0 | 0 | 22 | 4 | +18 | 12 | Zonal Group Stage | | | 8–2 | | 8–0 |
| 2 | Lamka FA | 4 | 3 | 0 | 1 | 18 | 6 | +12 | 9 | Zonal Group Stage | 1–3 | | 3–1 | | |
| 3 | Muvanlai Athletics | 4 | 1 | 1 | 2 | 6 | 13 | −7 | 4 | | | | | | 2–2 |
| 4 | Sadar Hills FA | 4 | 1 | 0 | 3 | 8 | 10 | −2 | 3 | | 1–3 | 2–6 | 0–1 | | |
| 5 | Chikim FA | 4 | 0 | 1 | 3 | 2 | 23 | −21 | 1 | | | 0–8 | | 0–5 | |

Source: AIFF

== Pre-qualification Round ==
=== Pre-qualification Group I ===
| Pos | Team | Pld | W | D | L | GF | GA | GD | Pts | Qualification | MOFC | PUKFC | SBSS | BSA | SPFC | MSP |
|---|---|---|---|---|---|---|---|---|---|---|---|---|---|---|---|---|
| 1 | Maharashtra Oranje | 1 | 1 | 0 | 0 | 4 | 2 | +2 | 3 | Pre-qualification Group J | | | | 4–2 | | |
| 2 | Pune-UKM Kothrud FC | 1 | 1 | 0 | 0 | 3 | 1 | +2 | 3 | Pre-qualification Group J | | | | | | |
| 3 | SSE BFC Soccer Schools, Mumbai | 1 | 1 | 0 | 0 | 2 | 0 | +2 | 3 | Pre-qualification Group J | | | | | | 2–0 |
| 4 | Brothers Sports Association | 1 | 0 | 0 | 1 | 2 | 4 | −2 | 0 | | | | | | | |
| 5 | Snigmay Pune Football Club | 1 | 0 | 0 | 1 | 1 | 3 | −2 | 0 | | | 1–3 | | | | |
| 6 | Mumbai Soccer Prodigies | 1 | 0 | 0 | 1 | 0 | 2 | −2 | 0 | | | | | | | |

Source: AIFF

=== Pre-qualification Group J ===
| Pos | Team | Pld | W | D | L | GF | GA | GD | Pts | Qualification | PUKFC | SBSS | MOFC |
|---|---|---|---|---|---|---|---|---|---|---|---|---|---|
| 1 | Pune-UKM Kothrud FC | 2 | 1 | 0 | 1 | 4 | 3 | +1 | 3 | Zonal Group Stage | | | 4–1 |
| 2 | SSE BFC Soccer Schools, Mumbai | 2 | 1 | 0 | 1 | 4 | 4 | 0 | 3 | Zonal Group Stage | 2–0 | | |
| 3 | Maharashtra Oranje | 2 | 1 | 0 | 1 | 5 | 6 | −1 | 3 | | | 4–2 | |

Source: AIFF

=== Pre-qualification Group M ===
| Pos | Team | Pld | W | D | L | GF | GA | GD | Pts | Qualification | ACMK | PFCK | DBV |
|---|---|---|---|---|---|---|---|---|---|---|---|---|---|
| 1 | AC Milan Academy Kerala | 2 | 2 | 0 | 0 | 5 | 2 | +3 | 6 | Zonal Group Stage | | | 3–1 |
| 2 | PFC Kerala | 2 | 1 | 0 | 1 | 3 | 3 | 0 | 3 | | 1–2 | | |
| 3 | Don Bosco Vaduthala | 2 | 0 | 0 | 2 | 2 | 5 | −3 | 0 | | | 1–2 | |

Source: AIFF

=== Pre-qualification Group P ===
| Pos | Team | Pld | W | D | L | GF | GA | GD | Pts | Qualification | BCFC | SUFC | RFC |
|---|---|---|---|---|---|---|---|---|---|---|---|---|---|
| 1 | Bangalore City FC | 2 | 2 | 0 | 0 | 7 | 3 | +4 | 6 | Disqualified | | | 3–1 |
| 2 | South United FC | 2 | 0 | 1 | 1 | 3 | 5 | −2 | 1 | Zonal Group Stage | 2–4 | | |
| 3 | Roots Football Club | 2 | 0 | 1 | 1 | 2 | 4 | −2 | 1 | | | 1–1 | |

Source: AIFF

=== Pre-qualification Group S ===
| Pos | Team | Pld | W | D | L | GF | GA | GD | Pts | Qualification | THDFC | VFC | SGFC |
|---|---|---|---|---|---|---|---|---|---|---|---|---|---|
| 1 | Thadam FC | 2 | 2 | 0 | 0 | 14 | 3 | +11 | 6 | Zonal Group Stage | | | 11–2 |
| 2 | Vels Football Club | 2 | 1 | 0 | 1 | 2 | 3 | −1 | 3 | | 1–3 | | |
| 3 | Sirukalathur Galatipet Football Club | 2 | 0 | 0 | 2 | 2 | 12 | −10 | 0 | | | 0–1 | |

Source: AIFF

=== Pre-qualification Group V ===
| Pos | Team | Pld | W | D | L | GF | GA | GD | Pts | Qualification | MYFA | DBSSI | RFC |
|---|---|---|---|---|---|---|---|---|---|---|---|---|---|
| 1 | Murugappa Youth Football Academy | 2 | 2 | 0 | 0 | 10 | 0 | +10 | 6 | Zonal Group Stage | | | 6–0 |
| 2 | Dream Big Soccer School India, Karur | 2 | 1 | 0 | 1 | 4 | 4 | 0 | 3 | | 0–4 | | |
| 3 | Reeds FC | 2 | 0 | 0 | 2 | 0 | 10 | −10 | 0 | | | 0–4 | |

Source: AIFF

== Zonal Group Stage ==
=== Zonal Group A ===
| Pos | Team | Pld | W | D | L | GF | GA | GD | Pts | Qualification | PFC | MAFC | CORB | REK | SDMSA | HLYN | HIFC |
|---|---|---|---|---|---|---|---|---|---|---|---|---|---|---|---|---|---|
| 1 | Punjab FC | 12 | 10 | 1 | 1 | 58 | 9 | +49 | 31 | Final round | | 3–2 | 7–1 | 4–0 | 1–0 | 7–0 | 10–0 |
| 2 | Minerva Academy | 12 | 7 | 4 | 1 | 43 | 10 | +33 | 25 | | 2–2 | | 3–1 | 1–1 | 0–0 | 13–0 | 5–0 |
| 3 | Corbett FC | 12 | 7 | 1 | 4 | 26 | 19 | +7 | 22 | Final round playoff | 2–0 | 1–2 | | 0–0 | 0–2 | 5–0 | 4–1 |
| 4 | Real Kashmir | 12 | 3 | 6 | 3 | 17 | 18 | −1 | 15 | | 1–3 | 1–1 | 1–3 | | 1–1 | 2–2 | 4–0 |
| 5 | Sri Dashmesh Martial Sports Academy | 12 | 4 | 2 | 6 | 11 | 14 | −3 | 14 | | 0–4 | 1–2 | 0–1 | 1–3 | | 2–1 | 2–0 |
| 6 | Himalayan FC | 12 | 2 | 3 | 7 | 12 | 40 | −28 | 9 | | 1–4 | 0–2 | 1–2 | 2–2 | 1–0 | | 3–0 |
| 7 | Himachal FC | 12 | 0 | 1 | 11 | 4 | 61 | −57 | 1 | | 0–13 | 0–10 | 2–6 | 0–1 | 0–2 | 1–1 | |

Source: AIFF

=== Zonal Group B ===
| Pos | Team | Pld | W | D | L | GF | GA | GD | Pts | Qualification | SUD | ZFA | JSFC | RUFC | LCFC | TLFC | DEL | LFFC |
|---|---|---|---|---|---|---|---|---|---|---|---|---|---|---|---|---|---|---|
| 1 | Sudeva Delhi | 12 | 10 | 1 | 1 | 41 | 7 | +34 | 31 | Final round | | 1–0 | 1–0 | 1–0 | 8–0 | 9–1 | 2–0 | 12–0 |
| 2 | Zinc Football Academy | 12 | 9 | 2 | 1 | 51 | 4 | +47 | 29 | Final round | 5–0 | | 3–0 | 2–0 | 7–0 | 6–0 | 11–0 | - |
| 3 | Juba Sangha FC | 12 | 7 | 3 | 2 | 32 | 13 | +19 | 24 | | 0–0 | 2–2 | | 0–0 | 2–0 | 6–4 | 5–0 | 8–1 |
| 4 | Rajasthan United | 12 | 5 | 2 | 5 | 20 | 23 | −3 | 17 | | 1–5 | 0–7 | 2–3 | | 2–1 | 3–0 | 3–1 | - |
| 5 | Lakecity FC | 12 | 4 | 0 | 8 | 18 | 43 | −25 | 12 | | 0–5 | 0–3 | 1–6 | 0–3 | | 4–3 | 5–2 | 3–2 |
| 6 | Techtro Lucknow FC | 12 | 2 | 2 | 8 | 20 | 40 | −20 | 8 | | 0–3 | 0–0 | 0–1 | 3–3 | 2–4 | | 4–0 | - |
| 7 | Delhi FC | 12 | 0 | 0 | 12 | 5 | 57 | −52 | 0 | | 0–6 | 1–5 | 0–7 | 0–3 | 0–3 | 1–3 | | 1–5 |
| 8 | Lucknow Falcons Football Club | 0 | 0 | 0 | 0 | 0 | 0 | 0 | 0 | Withdrew | 1–5 | 0–5 | 0–5 | 1–7 | 0–1 | 1–1 | 5–1 | |

Source: AIFF

=== Zonal Group C ===
| Pos | Team | Pld | W | D | L | GF | GA | GD | Pts | Qualification | RFYC | ARA | MDSA | SGVP | SPM | PUKFC | SBSS |
|---|---|---|---|---|---|---|---|---|---|---|---|---|---|---|---|---|---|
| 1 | Reliance Foundation Young Champs | 12 | 12 | 0 | 0 | 45 | 9 | +36 | 36 | Final round | | 3–1 | 8–0 | 2–0 | 4–2 | 2–0 | 2–1 |
| 2 | ARA FC | 12 | 7 | 1 | 4 | 28 | 15 | +13 | 22 | Final round playoff | 2–3 | | 3–2 | 1–2 | 2–0 | 1–0 | 2–2 |
| 3 | MUM-Dsouza Football Academy | 12 | 7 | 0 | 5 | 25 | 38 | −13 | 21 | | 0–9 | 0–4 | | 2–1 | 1–0 | 1–0 | 4–3 |
| 4 | SGVP Football Club, Junagadh | 12 | 4 | 2 | 6 | 14 | 17 | −3 | 14 | | 0–3 | 1–0 | 1–4 | | 0–1 | 2–0 | 0–0 |
| 5 | Sports Mania | 11 | 4 | 0 | 7 | 19 | 23 | −4 | 12 | | 0–2 | 0–3 | 7–2 | 2–1 | | 2–4 | |
| 6 | Pune-UKM Kothrud FC | 12 | 3 | 1 | 8 | 12 | 21 | −9 | 10 | | 2–3 | 0–2 | 0–2 | 1–1 | 1–3 | | 2–1 |
| 7 | SSE BFC Soccer Schools, Mumbai | 11 | 1 | 2 | 8 | 17 | 37 | −20 | 5 | | 1–4 | 2–7 | 2–7 | 1–5 | 3–2 | 1–2 | |

Updated to match(es) played on 21 March 2026. Source: AIFF

=== Zonal Group D ===
| Pos | Team | Pld | W | D | L | GF | GA | GD | Pts | Qualification | FCG | FCM | DEM | SGUC | SESA | GASC | CHB |
|---|---|---|---|---|---|---|---|---|---|---|---|---|---|---|---|---|---|
| 1 | FC Goa | 12 | 8 | 3 | 1 | 28 | 11 | +17 | 27 | Final round | | 1–5 | 1–1 | 1–1 | 2–0 | 4–0 | 6–0 |
| 2 | Football Club Mangalore | 12 | 7 | 3 | 2 | 24 | 9 | +15 | 24 | Final round playoff | 1–1 | | 1–0 | 1–0 | 4–0 | 1–1 | 6–1 |
| 3 | Dempo SC | 12 | 6 | 4 | 2 | 17 | 9 | +8 | 22 | | 1–2 | 2–1 | | 2–0 | 1–1 | 1–0 | 1–0 |
| 4 | South Goa United Club of Sports & Culture | 12 | 4 | 3 | 5 | 17 | 14 | +3 | 15 | | 1–2 | 2–0 | 0–2 | | 1–1 | 1–1 | 4–0 |
| 5 | Sesa Football Academy | 12 | 3 | 4 | 5 | 13 | 15 | −2 | 13 | | 0–1 | 0–0 | 2–2 | 1–3 | | 3–0 | 1–0 |
| 6 | Guardian Angel SC | 12 | 3 | 3 | 6 | 13 | 23 | −10 | 12 | | 1–5 | 1–2 | 0–3 | 3–1 | 1–0 | | 0–0 |
| 7 | Churchill Brothers FC | 12 | 0 | 2 | 10 | 4 | 35 | −31 | 2 | | 0–2 | 0–2 | 1–1 | 0–3 | 0–4 | 2–5 | |

Source: AIFF

=== Zonal Group E ===
| Pos | Team | Pld | W | D | L | GF | GA | GD | Pts | Qualification | BFC | GOK | KSFC | AIA | MFA | KBFC | SUFC | ACMK |
|---|---|---|---|---|---|---|---|---|---|---|---|---|---|---|---|---|---|---|
| 1 | Bengaluru FC | 14 | 12 | 1 | 1 | 50 | 9 | +41 | 37 | Final round | | 3–0 | 0–2 | 3–2 | 2–1 | 3–0 | 6–0 | 11–0 |
| 2 | Gokulam Kerala | 14 | 9 | 1 | 4 | 46 | 18 | +28 | 28 | Final round | 0–3 | | 1–2 | 6–0 | 2–1 | 2–0 | 7–1 | 8–0 |
| 3 | Kickstart FC | 14 | 8 | 2 | 4 | 32 | 13 | +19 | 26 | | 1–1 | 2–1 | | 1–3 | 1–2 | 2–0 | 11–0 | 5–2 |
| 4 | Alchemy International FA | 14 | 7 | 3 | 4 | 30 | 23 | +7 | 24 | | 1–4 | 1–1 | 0–0 | | 3–1 | 2–0 | 2–1 | 4–0 |
| 5 | Muthoot Football Academy | 14 | 7 | 1 | 6 | 27 | 23 | +4 | 22 | | 0–2 | 2–3 | 2–1 | 3–1 | | 2–1 | 4–3 | 5–0 |
| 6 | Kerala Blasters | 14 | 5 | 1 | 8 | 27 | 28 | −1 | 16 | | 2–3 | 1–7 | 1–0 | 2–2 | 1–0 | | 5–0 | 5–2 |
| 7 | South United FC | 14 | 1 | 2 | 11 | 16 | 62 | −46 | 5 | | 0–6 | 2–4 | 0–3 | 1–6 | 3–3 | 2–1 | | 2–2 |
| 8 | AC Milan Academy Kerala | 14 | 1 | 1 | 12 | 9 | 61 | −52 | 4 | | 0–3 | 0–4 | 0–1 | 0–3 | 0–1 | 1–8 | 2–1 | |

Source: AIFF

=== Zonal Group F ===
| Pos | Team | Pld | W | D | L | GF | GA | GD | Pts | Qualification | FCM | SRD | FCMA | MYFA | THDFC | LFP | FCT |
|---|---|---|---|---|---|---|---|---|---|---|---|---|---|---|---|---|---|
| 1 | FC Madras | 12 | 12 | 0 | 0 | 78 | 2 | +76 | 36 | Final round | | 2–0 | 6–0 | 11–0 | 7–0 | 11–0 | 8–0 |
| 2 | Sreenidi Deccan | 11 | 8 | 1 | 2 | 34 | 9 | +25 | 25 | Final round playoff | 0–1 | | 7–1 | 2–0 | 5–0 | | 4–0 |
| 3 | FC Marina Academy, Chennai | 12 | 5 | 3 | 4 | 23 | 26 | −3 | 18 | | 1–3 | 1–2 | | 3–0 | 3–3 | 1–0 | 2–0 |
| 4 | Murugappa Youth Football Academy | 12 | 5 | 2 | 5 | 25 | 25 | 0 | 17 | | 0–2 | 0–2 | 1–1 | | 2–0 | 3–2 | 8–0 |
| 5 | Thadam FC | 12 | 4 | 3 | 5 | 26 | 43 | −17 | 15 | | 1–11 | 2–4 | 2–2 | 2–2 | | 4–3 | 5–1 |
| 6 | LFP Football Academie | 11 | 1 | 1 | 9 | 14 | 49 | −35 | 4 | | 0–9 | 2–2 | 2–6 | 0–7 | 2–3 | | 1–0 |
| 7 | FC Tamilions | 12 | 1 | 0 | 11 | 5 | 51 | −46 | 3 | | 0–7 | 0–6 | 0–2 | 0–2 | 1–4 | 3–2 | |

Updated to match(es) played on 22 Feb 2026. Source: AIFF

=== Zonal Group G ===
| Pos | Team | Pld | W | D | L | GF | GA | GD | Pts | Qualification | JAM | FAO | IKA | RKM | SAIL | YAFC | ABA | ALPH |
|---|---|---|---|---|---|---|---|---|---|---|---|---|---|---|---|---|---|---|
| 1 | Jamshedpur FC | 10 | 8 | 2 | 0 | 42 | 3 | +39 | 26 | Final round | | 3–0 | 4–0 | 1–1 | 5–0 | 9–0 | 2–0 | - |
| 2 | FAO Academy | 10 | 6 | 0 | 4 | 22 | 12 | +10 | 18 (Note: Head-to-head: FAO Academy 4–3 Inter Kashi) | Final round | 0–2 | | 1–2 | 0–1 | 3–0 | 3–0 | 1–8 | 2–2 |
| 3 | Inter Kashi | 10 | 5 | 3 | 2 | 26 | 15 | +11 | 18 | | 2–2 | 1–3 | | 6–0 | 3–2 | 5–0 | 2–2 | 4–1 |
| 4 | RKM Football Academy | 10 | 3 | 4 | 3 | 14 | 19 | −5 | 13 | | 0–4 | 2–3 | 2–2 | | 3–2 | 4–0 | - | - |
| 5 | SAIL Football Academy, Bokaro | 10 | 2 | 2 | 6 | 11 | 31 | −20 | 8 | | 0–6 | 0–7 | 1–1 | 1–1 | | 2–0 | 0–1 | - |
| 6 | YAFC,Choudwar | 10 | 0 | 1 | 9 | 3 | 38 | −35 | 1 | | 0–6 | 1–2 | 0–4 | 0–0 | 2–3 | | 0–5 | 3–1 |
| 7 | AIFF Bhubaneswar Academy | 0 | 0 | 0 | 0 | 0 | 0 | 0 | 0 | Withdrew | 1–1 | 0–3 | 4–2 | 4–2 | 5–1 | 4–0 | | 9–0 |
| 8 | Alpha Sports Academy | 0 | 0 | 0 | 0 | 0 | 0 | 0 | 0 | Withdrew | 0–3 | - | - | 0–1 | 1–1 | 4–1 | - | |

Source: AIFF

=== Zonal Group H ===
| Pos | Team | Pld | W | D | L | GF | GA | GD | Pts | Qualification | EBFC | MBSG | USC | DHB | SKM | MSC | AFTA | KUCT |
|---|---|---|---|---|---|---|---|---|---|---|---|---|---|---|---|---|---|---|
| 1 | East Bengal FC | 10 | 8 | 1 | 1 | 24 | 5 | +19 | 25 | Final round | | 2–0 | 3–1 | 3–0 | 4–0 | 4–1 | - | 5–0 |
| 2 | Mohun Bagan | 10 | 6 | 2 | 2 | 32 | 10 | +22 | 20 | Final round | 1–1 | | 2–3 | 0–0 | 4–2 | 7–1 | 2–0 | - |
| 3 | United SC | 10 | 6 | 2 | 2 | 13 | 7 | +6 | 20 | | 2–0 | 0–1 | | 2–0 | 1–1 | 1–0 | 4–2 | - |
| 4 | Diamond Harbour | 10 | 2 | 4 | 4 | 8 | 16 | −8 | 10 | | 0–2 | 0–5 | 0–0 | | 1–1 | 3–1 | 1–1 | 0–0 |
| 5 | SKM Sports Foundation | 10 | 1 | 3 | 6 | 9 | 21 | −12 | 6 | | 0–2 | 0–3 | 0–1 | 1–3 | | 1–1 | 3–0 | 1–0 |
| 6 | Mohammedan | 10 | 0 | 2 | 8 | 7 | 34 | −27 | 2 | | 0–3 | 1–9 | 0–2 | 1–1 | 1–3 | | 0–3 | - |
| 7 | AIFF FIFA Talent Academy | 0 | 0 | 0 | 0 | 0 | 0 | 0 | 0 | Withdrew | 1–0 | 1–2 | 1–0 | 1–1 | 2–2 | 4–1 | | 4–0 |
| 8 | Keshab-Uma Charitable Trust FA | 0 | 0 | 0 | 0 | 0 | 0 | 0 | 0 | Withdrew | 1–2 | 0–6 | 1–3 | - | 1–1 | - | 2–1 | |

Source: AIFF

=== Zonal Group I ===
| Pos | Team | Pld | W | D | L | GF | GA | GD | Pts | Qualification | F4C | ASU | NEU | PLL | LAM | SHI | KASA |
|---|---|---|---|---|---|---|---|---|---|---|---|---|---|---|---|---|---|
| 1 | Football 4 Change Academy | 12 | 9 | 1 | 2 | 38 | 15 | +23 | 28 | Final round | | 3–1 | 3–2 | 2–3 | 5–1 | 3–1 | 1–1 |
| 2 | ASUFII FA | 12 | 7 | 2 | 3 | 26 | 18 | +8 | 23 | Final round playoff | 2–0 | | 1–1 | 1–1 | 2–0 | 1–2 | 4–2 |
| 3 | NorthEast United | 12 | 5 | 2 | 5 | 32 | 30 | +2 | 17 | | 2–4 | 1–2 | | 4–4 | 4–0 | 5–0 | 3–0 |
| 4 | Pehlum Lamhil Lawm | 12 | 4 | 3 | 5 | 27 | 28 | −1 | 15 | | 1–3 | 5–4 | 0–2 | | 2–3 | 3–2 | 3–0 |
| 5 | Lamka FA | 12 | 5 | 0 | 7 | 20 | 37 | −17 | 15 | | 1–8 | 1–4 | 5–3 | 2–1 | | 1–3 | 2–0 |
| 6 | Shillong Lajong | 12 | 4 | 1 | 7 | 24 | 32 | −8 | 13 | | 0–3 | 1–2 | 2–5 | 4–3 | 3–4 | | 5–1 |
| 7 | KASA Football Coaching Center | 12 | 2 | 3 | 7 | 18 | 25 | −7 | 9 | | 0–3 | 1–2 | 9–0 | 1–1 | 2–0 | 1–1 | |

Source: AIFF

=== Zonal Group J ===
| Pos | Team | Pld | W | D | L | GF | GA | GD | Pts | Qualification | CLA | TYDA | SGH | RFCC | NRL | ELIT |
|---|---|---|---|---|---|---|---|---|---|---|---|---|---|---|---|---|
| 1 | Classic Football Academy | 10 | 9 | 1 | 0 | 33 | 4 | +29 | 28 | Final round | | 1–1 | 3–0 | 4–2 | 7–0 | 2–0 |
| 2 | TYDA | 10 | 7 | 2 | 1 | 19 | 6 | +13 | 23 | Final round playoff | 0–1 | | 3–1 | 1–0 | 3–1 | 2–0 |
| 3 | Sang-Gai Heroes | 10 | 3 | 2 | 5 | 16 | 21 | −5 | 11 | | 0–3 | 2–2 | | 1–4 | 4–1 | 3–0 |
| 4 | Regular Football Coaching Center | 10 | 3 | 1 | 6 | 18 | 16 | +2 | 10 | | 0–2 | 0–1 | 1–2 | | 1–2 | 3–1 |
| 5 | Numaligarh Refinery Limited Football Academy | 10 | 2 | 2 | 6 | 9 | 25 | −16 | 8 | | 1–4 | 0–2 | 1–1 | 2–2 | | 1–0 |
| 6 | Elite FA | 10 | 2 | 0 | 8 | 5 | 28 | −23 | 6 | | 0–6 | 0–4 | 3–2 | 0–5 | 1–0 | |

Source: AIFF

== Final Round Playoff ==
=== Playoff Group A ===
| Pos | Team | Pld | W | D | L | GF | GA | GD | Pts | Qualification | TYDA | ARA | FCM |
|---|---|---|---|---|---|---|---|---|---|---|---|---|---|
| 1 | TYDA | 2 | 2 | 0 | 0 | 12 | 3 | +9 | 6 | Final round | | | 8–2 |
| 2 | ARA FC | 2 | 1 | 0 | 1 | 3 | 5 | −2 | 3 | | 1–4 | | |
| 3 | Football Club Mangalore | 2 | 0 | 0 | 2 | 3 | 10 | −7 | 0 | | | 1–2 | |

Updated to match(es) played on 13 April 2026. Source: AIFF

=== Playoff Group B ===
| Pos | Team | Pld | W | D | L | GF | GA | GD | Pts | Qualification | ASU | SRD | CORB |
|---|---|---|---|---|---|---|---|---|---|---|---|---|---|
| 1 | ASUFII FA | 2 | 2 | 0 | 0 | 6 | 3 | +3 | 6 | Final round | | | 4–2 |
| 2 | Sreenidi Deccan | 2 | 1 | 0 | 1 | 3 | 3 | 0 | 3 | | 1–2 | | |
| 3 | Corbett FC | 2 | 0 | 0 | 2 | 3 | 6 | −3 | 0 | | | 1–2 | |

Updated to match(es) played on 13 April 2026. Source: AIFF

== Final Round ==
=== Qualification ===
| Club | Qualified as |
|---|---|
| Punjab FC | Zonal Group A Champions |
| Sudeva Delhi | Zonal Group B Champions |
| Zinc Academy | Zonal Group B Runners-up |
| Reliance Young Champs | Zonal Group C Champions |
| FC Goa | Zonal Group D Champions |
| Bengaluru FC | Zonal Group E Champions |
| Gokulam Kerala | Zonal Group E Runners-up |
| FC Madras | Zonal Group F Champions |
| Jamshedpur FC | Zonal Group G Champions |
| FAO Academy | Zonal Group G Runners-up |
| East Bengal | Zonal Group H Champions |
| Mohun Bagan | Zonal Group H Runners-up |
| Football 4 Change | Zonal Group I Champions |
| Classic FA | Zonal Group J Champions |
| TYDA | Final Round Playoff Group A Champions |
| ASUII FA | Final Round Playoff Group B Champions |

=== Group A ===
| Pos | Team | Pld | W | D | L | GF | GA | GD | Pts | Qualification | F4C | BEN | SUD | GOA |
|---|---|---|---|---|---|---|---|---|---|---|---|---|---|---|
| 1 | Football 4 Change | 3 | 2 | 0 | 1 | 8 | 3 | +5 | 6 | Knockout-stage | | 2–3 | | |
| 2 | Bengaluru FC | 3 | 2 | 0 | 1 | 8 | 5 | +3 | 6 | Knockout-stage | | | 2–3 | 3–0 |
| 3 | Sudeva Delhi | 3 | 2 | 0 | 1 | 5 | 8 | −3 | 6 | | 0–5 | | | 2–1 |
| 4 | FC Goa | 3 | 0 | 0 | 3 | 1 | 6 | −5 | 0 | | 0–1 | | | |

Source: AIFF

=== Group B ===
| Pos | Team | Pld | W | D | L | GF | GA | GD | Pts | Qualification | JAM | CFA | MBSG | GOK |
|---|---|---|---|---|---|---|---|---|---|---|---|---|---|---|
| 1 | Jamshedpur FC | 3 | 1 | 2 | 0 | 6 | 5 | +1 | 5 | Knockout-stage | | | | |
| 2 | Classic FA | 3 | 1 | 2 | 0 | 4 | 3 | +1 | 5 | Knockout-stage | 2–2 | | 1–1 | |
| 3 | Mohun Bagan SG | 3 | 0 | 3 | 0 | 4 | 4 | 0 | 3 | | 2–2 | | | |
| 4 | Gokualm Kerala | 3 | 0 | 1 | 2 | 2 | 4 | −2 | 1 | | 1–2 | 1–0 | 1–1 | |

Source: AIFF

=== Group C ===
| Pos | Team | Pld | W | D | L | GF | GA | GD | Pts | Qualification | RFYC | ZFA | ASU | EB |
|---|---|---|---|---|---|---|---|---|---|---|---|---|---|---|
| 1 | Reliance Young Champs | 3 | 2 | 1 | 0 | 3 | 1 | +2 | 7 | Knockout-stage | | | 2–1 | 1–0 |
| 2 | Zinc FA | 3 | 1 | 2 | 0 | 4 | 3 | +1 | 5 | Knockout-stage | 0–0 | | 4–3 | |
| 3 | ASUFII FA | 3 | 1 | 0 | 2 | 8 | 8 | 0 | 3 | | | | | 3–1 |
| 4 | East Bengal | 3 | 0 | 1 | 2 | 1 | 4 | −3 | 1 | | | 0–0 | | |

Source: AIFF

=== Group D ===
| Pos | Team | Pld | W | D | L | GF | GA | GD | Pts | Qualification | TYDA | PUN | FCM | FAO |
|---|---|---|---|---|---|---|---|---|---|---|---|---|---|---|
| 1 | TYDA | 3 | 2 | 1 | 0 | 9 | 4 | +5 | 7 | Knockout-stage | | 3–3 | 3–0 | |
| 2 | Punjab FC | 3 | 2 | 1 | 0 | 7 | 5 | +2 | 7 | Knockout-stage | | | | 3–2 |
| 3 | FC Madras | 3 | 1 | 0 | 2 | 6 | 5 | +1 | 3 | | | 0–1 | | 6–1 |
| 4 | FAO Academy | 3 | 0 | 0 | 3 | 4 | 12 | −8 | 0 | | 1–3 | | | |

Source: AIFF

== Knockouts ==
=== Bracket ===
Quarterfinals
A1 | Football 4 Change | 2 (4)
B2 | Classic FA | 2 (3)
C1 | Young Champs | 1
D2 | Punjab FC | 6
B1 | Jamshedpur FC | 2 (1)
A2 | Bengaluru FC | 2 (4)
D1 | TYDA | 0
C2 | Zinc FA | 3

Semifinals
QF1 | Football 4 Change | 1
QF2 | Punjab FC | 2
QF3 | Bengaluru FC | 0
QF4 | Zinc FA | 4

Finals
SF1 | Punjab FC | 3
SF2 | Zinc FA | 0

=== Quarterfinals ===
23 April 2026
07:30 IST
QF 1

| Football 4 Change | 2–2 | Classic FA |
|---|---|---|
| Vaiphei 45'; T. Touthang; 88' | Report | 43' Kasar; 22' K. Singh |
Penalties
| Khongsai (penalty scored); O. Touthang (penalty missed); T. Touthang (penalty scored); Lalchhuaha (penalty scored); Tiwari (penalty scored) | 4–3 | (penalty scored) Kasar; (penalty missed) Thiumai; (penalty scored) Katwal; (penalty scored) M. Singh; (penalty missed) V. Singh |

Ramsar Sahib Sports Stadium, Garhshankar, Punjab, India

23 April 2026
16:30 IST
QF 3

| Jamshedpur | 2–2 | Bengaluru |
|---|---|---|
| Khyriem 45'; Das 87' | Report | 16' Chingakham; 64' Arbash |
Penalties
| Lawmsangzuala (penalty scored); Rayan (penalty missed); A. Meitei (penalty missed) | 1–4 | (penalty scored) Samson; (penalty scored) Ningthoujam; (penalty scored) Subba; (penalty scored) R. Singh |

Ramsar Sahib Sports Stadium, Garhshankar, Punjab, India

24 April 2026
16:30 IST
QF 2

| Young Champs | 1–6 | Punjab FC |
|---|---|---|
| Faris 66' | Report | 1', 59' Sameer; 11', 12' Yadav; 20' S. Singh; 84' Y. Singh |

Ramsar Sahib Sports Stadium, Garhshankar, Punjab, India

24 April 2026
16:30 IST
QF 4

| TYDA | 0–3 | Zinc FA |
|---|---|---|
| | Report | 17' Chetry; 62' Gope; 82' Ansari |

Ramsar Sahib Sports Stadium, Garhshankar, Punjab, India

=== Semifinals ===
26 April 2026
7:30 IST
SF 1

| Football 4 Change | 1–2 | Punjab FC |
|---|---|---|
| Touthang (yellow card) 38'; Kipgen 53' (yellow card) 80'; Bishwakarma (red card) | Report | 22' Sameer; 50' Yadav; (yellow card) 53' S. Singh; (yellow card) 55' T. Singh |

Ramsar Sahib Sports Stadium, Garhshankar, Punjab, India

26 April 2026
16:30 IST
SF 2

| Bengaluru FC | 0–4 | Zinc FA |
|---|---|---|
| (yellow card) 27' Takhellambam Bobbish; (yellow card) 76' Khuraijam Thomas Meitei; (yellow card) 88' Asem Nerjit Singh | Report | 13' Yash; (yellow card) 17' Bryant Dihingia; 34' Ashish Chetry; 34' Himanshu; 72' Himesh Meena |

Ramsar Sahib Sports Stadium, Garhshankar, Punjab, India

=== Final ===
28 April 2026
16:30 IST
Final

| Punjab FC | 3–0 | Zinc FA |
|---|---|---|
| 69' Karish Soram; 70' Vishal Yadav; 80' Thongram Rishikanta Singh | Report | (yellow card) 68' Yash |

Ramsar Sahib Sports Stadium, Garhshankar, Punjab, India

== Statistics ==
As of 28 April 2026

=== Top scorers ===
| Rank | Player | Team | Goals |
|---|---|---|---|
| 1 | (India) Md Mahmad Sami | Sudeva Delhi | 34 |
| 2 | (India) Ashish Chetry | Zinc FA | 25 |
| 3 | (India) Rohit | Thadam FC | 23 |
| 4 | (India) Wangkheirakpam John Singh | ASUFII FA | 22 |
| 5 | (India) Hemneichung Lunkim | Minerva Academy | 19 |
| 6 | (India) Yaman Sheoran | Inter Kashi | 18 |
| 6 | (India) Vishal Yadav | Punjab | 18 |
| 8 | (India) Daksh Agarwal | ARA FC | 17 |
| 9 | (India) Lamminthang Kipgen | ASUFII FA | 16 |
| 9 | (India) Lawmsangzuala | Jamshedpur | 16 |

== See also ==
- 2026 Reliance Foundation Development League
