= 2024 Reliance Foundation Development League =

Reliance Foundation Development League
- Season: 2024
- Dates: 14 February – 18 May
- Champions: Punjab (1st title)
- Next Gen Cup: East Bengal; Punjab; Muthoot FA
- Matches: 289
- Goals: 1,054 (3.65 per match)
- Top goalscorer: Omang Dodum; Monirul Molla (13 goals)

The 2024 Reliance Foundation Development League was the third season of the Reliance Foundation Development League, developmental football league organised by the Reliance Foundation and the AIFF.

The season features 57 teams divided into eight regions, each playing around 10 matches during the regional qualifiers held across multiple regions from 14 February to 10 April. Bengaluru FC are the defending champions.

== Format ==
The teams would predominantly feature U-21 players, with few overage players allowed as well. Participants in the league must have been born on or after January 1, 2003. Each team will play at least 10 matches in the regional qualifiers. 20 teams will qualify for the National group stage from the regional qualifiers. The top-three teams will play the National Championship Stage and the 2024 Next Gen Cup.

== Regional qualifiers ==
=== East region ===
Pos	Team	Pld	W	D	L	GF	GA	GD	Pts	Qualification
1	East Bengal	10	5	3	2	17	12	+5	18	Advance to National group stage
2	Mohun Bagan SG	10	4	3	3	22	13	+9	15	Advance to National group stage
3	Adamas United SA	10	3	4	3	9	13	−4	13	Advance to National group stage
4	Jamshedpur	10	2	6	2	15	13	+2	12	
5	United SC	7	2	3	2	10	8	+2	9	
6	Mohammedan	7	2	2	3	7	10	−3	8	
7	Kalighat MS	7	2	2	3	5	7	−2	8	
8	Odisha	7	1	3	3	7	16	−9	6	

Source: RFDL

=== Goa region ===
Pos	Team	Pld	W	D	L	GF	GA	GD	Pts	Qualification
1	FC Goa	10	7	2	1	36	8	+28	23	Advance to National group stage
2	Dempo SC	10	7	1	2	41	8	+33	22	Advance to National group stage
3	Pax of Nagoa SC	10	6	0	4	25	18	+7	18	Advance to National group stage
4	SC de Goa	10	5	0	5	23	17	+6	15	
5	Geno FC	7	2	3	2	28	10	+18	9	
6	SESA FA	7	2	2	3	17	9	+8	8	
7	Siddheshwar SCC	7	1	0	6	2	56	−54	3	
8	FC Mardol	7	0	0	7	1	47	−46	0	

Source: RFDL

=== Kerala region ===
Pos	Team	Pld	W	D	L	GF	GA	GD	Pts	Qualification
1	Muthoot FA	10	8	0	2	27	13	+14	24	Advance to National group stage
2	Kerala Blasters	10	6	1	3	23	18	+5	19	Advance to National group stage
3	Parappur FC	10	6	0	4	17	13	+4	18	Advance to National group stage
4	Gokulam Kerala	10	5	1	4	26	18	+8	16	
5	Wayanad United FC	7	3	1	3	11	14	−3	10	
6	Kovalam FC	7	1	2	4	7	14	−7	5	
7	SAI Kollam	7	1	1	5	9	17	−8	4	
8	LiFFA	7	1	0	6	7	20	−13	3	

Source: RFDL

=== Meghalaya-Assam region ===
Pos	Team	Pld	W	D	L	GF	GA	GD	Pts	Qualification
1	NorthEast United	10	10	0	0	30	2	+28	30	Advance to National group stage
2	Shillong Lajong	10	8	0	2	23	7	+16	24	
3	Mawlai SC	10	4	1	5	20	14	+6	13	
4	4ForAll FC	10	3	1	6	12	16	−4	10	
5	PFR FA	10	2	1	7	7	30	−23	7	
6	Little Stars Academy	10	1	1	8	9	32	−23	4	

Source: RFDL

=== Mizoram region ===
Pos	Team	Pld	W	D	L	GF	GA	GD	Pts	Qualification
1	Home Missions FC	10	8	2	0	27	10	+17	26	Advance to National group stage
2	Inkhel FC	10	5	3	2	16	14	+2	18	
3	Muthi FC	10	3	3	4	15	17	−2	12	
4	1st Bn MAP FA	8	3	0	5	19	17	+2	9	
5	Kulikawn FC	8	0	0	8	7	26	−19	0	

Source: RFDL

=== Mumbai region ===
Pos	Team	Pld	W	D	L	GF	GA	GD	Pts	Qualification
1	RFYC	10	9	1	0	25	8	+17	28	Advance to National group stage
2	MYJ–GMSC	10	7	0	3	19	15	+4	21	Advance to National group stage
3	Mumbai City	10	6	0	4	29	17	+12	18	Advance to National group stage
4	Iron Born FC	8	5	0	3	17	11	+6	15	
5	Oranje FC	8	3	1	4	16	13	+3	10	
6	Millat FC	8	2	3	3	8	13	−5	9	
7	CFCI	8	2	1	5	12	17	−5	7	
8	Kenkre FC	8	1	1	6	5	16	−11	4	
9	India Rush SC	8	0	1	7	5	26	−21	1	

Source: RFDL

=== North region ===
Pos	Team	Pld	W	D	L	GF	GA	GD	Pts	Qualification
1	Punjab	10	9	1	0	33	7	+26	28	Advance to National group stage
2	Delhi FC	10	5	4	1	36	11	+25	19	Advance to National group stage
3	Sudeva Delhi	10	5	2	3	22	14	+8	17	Advance to National group stage
4	Zinc FA	10	3	2	5	10	31	−21	11	
5	Rajasthan United	10	2	1	7	8	29	−21	7	
6	AIPL FC	10	0	2	8	6	23	−17	2	

Source: RFDL

=== South region ===
Pos	Team	Pld	W	D	L	GF	GA	GD	Pts	Qualification
1	Bengaluru	10	7	1	2	28	6	+22	22	Advance to National group stage
2	Roots FC	10	6	1	3	15	7	+8	19	Advance to National group stage
3	Chennaiyin	10	6	1	3	17	13	+4	19	Advance to National group stage
4	Sreenidi Deccan	10	5	2	3	17	10	+7	17	
5	Kickstart FC	10	2	3	5	16	23	−7	9	
6	Snipers FC	6	0	1	5	4	20	−16	1	
7	Rebels FC	6	0	1	5	3	21	−18	1	

Source: RFDL

==== Regional Stage Top scorers ====
Rank	Player	Club	Goals
1	Omang Dodum	Punjab	12
2	Samson Keishing	Delhi FC	10
2	Gwgwmsar Gayary	Delhi FC	10
2	Sreekuttan M S	Kerala Blasters	10
5	Nandhu Krishna A	Parappur FC	9
5	Alan Saji	RFYC	9
7	Monirul Molla	Bengaluru	8
8	Laishram Danny Meitei	NorthEast United	7
8	Akshat Mehra	NorthEast United	7
8	Ismael Khawpuimawia	Muthi FC	7

== National group stage ==
Top 20 teams qualified from the regional qualifiers to the National group stage. National group stage is divided into 4 groups of 5 teams, with each group winners advancing to the National Championship stage.

=== Qualified teams ===
No.	Club	Qualified as
1	East Bengal	East region champions
2	Mohun Bagan SG	East region runners-up
3	Adamas United SA	East region 3rd
4	FC Goa	Goa region champions
5	Dempo SC	Goa region runners-up
6	Pax of Nagoa SC	Goa region 3rd
7	Muthoot FA	Kerala region champions
8	Kerala Blasters	Kerala region runners-up
9	Parappur FC	Kerala region 3rd
10	NorthEast United	Meghalaya-Assam region champions
11	Home Missions FC	Mizoram region champions
12	RFYC	Mumbai region champions
13	MYJ–GMSC	Mumbai region runners-up
14	Mumbai City	Mumbai region 3rd
15	Punjab FC	North region champions
16	Delhi FC	North region runners-up
17	Sudeva Delhi	North region 3rd
18	Bengaluru FC	South region champions
19	Roots FC	South region runners-up
20	Chennaiyin FC	South region 3rd

=== Group A ===
All matches to be played at Reliance Corporate Park Football Ground, Ghansoli, Navi Mumbai.

Pos	Team	Pld	W	D	L	GF	GA	GD	Pts	Qualification	BFC	RYC	DEM	CFC	KRB
1	Bengaluru (Q)	4	3	1	0	8	1	+7	10	Advance to National championship stage	—	0–0	—	2–0	—
2	RFYC (H)	4	3	1	0	8	2	+6	10		—	—	4–1	3–1	—
3	Dempo SC	4	1	1	2	2	6	−4	4		0–2	—	—	1–0	—
4	Chennaiyin	4	1	0	3	3	7	−4	3		—	—	—	—	2–1
5	Kerala Blasters	4	0	1	3	2	7	−5	1		1–4	0–1	0–0	—	—

Source: RFDL
Rules for classification: 1) Points; 2) Goal difference; 3) Head-to-head points; 4) Head-to-head goal difference
(H) Hosts; (Q) Qualified for the phase indicated

=== Group B ===
All matches to be played at EMS Stadium, Kozhikode.

Pos	Team	Pld	W	D	L	GF	GA	GD	Pts	Qualification	MUT	RFC	PAR	FCG	GSC–GSC
1	Muthoot FA (H, Q)	4	3	1	0	14	0	+14	10	Advance to National championship stage	—	0–0	—	5–0	1–0
2	Roots FC	4	3	1	0	5	0	+5	10		—	—	1–0	—	3–0
3	Parappur FC (H)	4	1	1	2	8	11	−3	4		0–8	—	—	—	—
4	FC Goa	4	1	1	2	3	8	−5	4		—	0–1	1–1	—	—
5	MYJ–GMSC	4	0	0	4	2	13	−11	0		—	—	1–7	1–2	—

Source: RFDL
Rules for classification: 1) Points; 2) Goal difference; 3) Head-to-head points; 4) Head-to-head goal difference
(H) Hosts; (Q) Qualified for the phase indicated

=== Group C ===
All matches to be played at University of Delhi Stadium, Delhi.

Pos	Team	Pld	W	D	L	GF	GA	GD	Pts	Qualification	EAB	NEU	DEL	HOM	ADM
1	East Bengal (Q)	4	3	0	1	5	2	+3	9	Advance to National championship stage	—	—	0–2	—	2–0
2	NorthEast United	3	1	1	1	7	3	+4	4		0–1	—	—	26 Apr	5–0
3	Delhi FC (H)	3	1	1	1	5	4	+1	4		—	2–2	—	—	—
4	Home Missions FC	3	1	1	1	2	3	−1	4		0–2	—	2–1	—	—
5	Adamas United SA	3	0	1	2	1	8	−7	1		—	—	26 Apr	1–1	—

Source: RFDL
Rules for classification: 1) Points; 2) Goal difference; 3) Head-to-head points; 4) Head-to-head goal difference
(H) Hosts; (Q) Qualified for the phase indicated

=== Group D ===
All matches to be played at Duler Football Stadium, Mapusa.

Pos	Team	Pld	W	D	L	GF	GA	GD	Pts	Qualification	PFC	SUD	MBS	MCI	PAX
1	Punjab FC (Q)	4	3	1	0	11	1	+10	10	Advance to National championship stage	—	1–1	2–0	5–0	—
2	Sudeva Delhi	4	3	1	0	13	4	+9	10		—	—	3–1	—	7–1
3	Mohun Bagan SG	4	2	0	2	6	6	0	6		—	—	—	2–1	3–0
4	Mumbai City	4	1	0	3	4	10	−6	3		—	1–2	—	—	2–1
5	Pax of Nagoa SC (H)	4	0	0	4	2	15	−13	0		0–3	—	—	—	—

Source: RFDL
Rules for classification: 1) Points; 2) Goal difference; 3) Head-to-head points; 4) Head-to-head goal difference
(H) Hosts; (Q) Qualified for the phase indicated

==== National Stage Top scorers ====
Rank	Player	Club	Goals
1	Monirul Molla	Bengaluru	5
1	Mohammed Rishad Gafoor	Muthoot FA	5
3	Prajal Tushir	Sudeva Delhi	3
3	Serto Worneilen Kom	Sudeva Delhi	3
3	Hafis P A	Parappur FC	3
3	Anandhu Nambrath Sundran	Parappur FC	3
3	Salahudheen Adnan K	Muthoot FA	3
3	Macarton Louis Nickson	NorthEast United	3
3	Vishnu PV	East Bengal	3
3	Manglenthang Kipgen	Punjab FC	3

== National championship stage ==
=== Qualification ===
Club	Qualified as
Bengaluru	Group A champions
Muthoot FA	Group B champions
East Bengal	Group C champions
Punjab	Group D champions

- Top 3 teams from this stage will qualify for Next Gen Cup.

=== Bracket ===
All matches to be played at Reliance Corporate Park Football Ground, Ghansoli, Navi Mumbai.

Semifinals
A1	Bengaluru	0 (2)
D1	Punjab (p)	0 (4)
C1	East Bengal (p)	3 (4)
B1	Muthoot FA	3 (3)

Final
D1	Punjab	3
C1	East Bengal	2
Third place
A1	Bengaluru	2 (4)
B1	Muthoot FA (p)	2 (5)

=== Semi-finals ===
14 May 2024
Semi-final 1

Bengaluru	0–0	Punjab
Penalties
Penalty missed Penalty scored	2–4	Penalty scored

Reliance Corporate Park Football Ground, Ghansoli, Navi Mumbai

14 May 2024
Semi-final 2

East Bengal	3–3	Muthoot FA
Shyamal 57'; Vishnu 59'; Suman 76'		Ashar 12'; Umer 25'; Adil 90+1'
Penalties
Vishnu (penalty scored); Guite (penalty scored); Joseph (penalty scored); Shyamal (penalty missed); Suman (penalty scored)	4–3	Penalty missed Penalty scored

Reliance Corporate Park Football Ground, Ghansoli, Navi Mumbai

=== Third place ===
17 May 2024

Bengaluru	2–2	Muthoot FA
Ankith 27, 40'		Salahudheen 2'; Adil 46'
Penalties
Penalty scored Penalty missed	4–5	Penalty scored

Reliance Corporate Park Football Ground, Ghansoli, Navi Mumbai

=== Final ===
18 May 2024
14:00 IST

East Bengal	2–3	Punjab
Guite 41'; Joseph 50'		Omang 10'; Yendrembam 60'; Harmanpreet 73'

Reliance Corporate Park Football Ground, Ghansoli, Navi Mumbai
