= Reliance Foundation Development League =

Reserve football league in India

- Organising bodies: Reliance Foundation
- Founded: 7 April 2022; 4 years ago
- Country: India
- Number of clubs: 54
- Level on pyramid: Youth
- International cup: Next Gen Cup
- Current champions: Bengaluru (3rd title)
- Most championships: Bengaluru (3 titles)
- Website: RFDL
- Current: 2026–27

The Reliance Foundation Development League (RFDL) is a youth football league in India organised by the Reliance Foundation. A total of 60+ teams participates in the tournament. The league was founded to offer opportunities to the young players across the country.

== Background ==
In June 2021 it was proposed after a meeting of the FSDL and CEOs of all the ISL clubs that a new developmental competition called Reliance Foundation Development League would be introduced in 2022. This new league would consist of the youth and reserve teams of all the ISL clubs, with aim to develop young players as there has been limited number of competitions and leagues outside the ISL since the pandemic. The teams would predominantly feature U-21 players with few overage players allowed as well. The inaugural season of the proposed two-month league will be held in Goa inside a bio-secure bubble between January and March, following the same medical and safety procedures for 2021–22 ISL season, but got postponed to April 15.

== Player eligibility ==
- should be under-21
- should be at least 15 at the time of registration
- permission to include five players aged 21-23, no more than three players are allowed in the playing XI
- maximum of 24 players
- no foreign nationals

== Seasons ==
Season	Zones	Clubs	Champions	Runners-up	Third place
2022	1	8	Bengaluru (1)	Kerala Blasters	Hyderabad
2023	9	59	Bengaluru (2)	Sudeva Delhi	Mohun Bagan SG
2024	8	57	Punjab	East Bengal	Muthoot FA
2024–25	9	54	Mohun Bagan	Classic FA	FC Goa
2025–26	9	54	Bengaluru (3)	FC Goa	Punjab FC

== Teams ==
=== 2022 season ===
A total of eight teams competed in a single round basis. A total of 28 matches were played.

Clubs
Bengaluru FC	Kerala Blasters FC
Chennaiyin FC	Mumbai City FC
FC Goa	Hyderabad FC
Jamshedpur FC	Reliance Foundation Young Champs

=== 2023 season ===
59 Teams were divided into 9 zones for the regional qualifiers, each containing 4–8 teams.

Clubs
Assam-Meghalaya Zone
Malki SC	Mawlai SC	NorthEast United FC
Rangdajied United FC	Ryntih FC	Shillong Lajong FC
East Zone
Mohun Bagan SG	East Bengal FC	Jamshedpur FC
Mohammedan SC	New Alipore Suruchi Sangha	Odisha FC
United SC		
Goa Zone
Churchill Brothers FC Goa	Dempo SC	FC Goa
Salgaocar FC	SESA FA	Velsao SCC
Kerala Zone
FC Areekode	Gokulam Kerala FC	FC Kerala
Kerala Blasters FC	Kovalam FC	LIFFA
Muthoot FA	Parappur FC	
Manipur Zone
Classic FA	Football 4 Change Academy	North Eastern Sporting Union
Pehlum Lamhil Lawm	Poloi FC	SAI-RC
Social Development Club	Wangoi FA	
Mizoram Zone
1st Bn MAP Football Academy	Chanmari FC	Chanmari West FC
Chawnpui FC	Ramthar Veng FC	SYS Football Club
Mumbai Zone
India Rush Soccer Club	Iron Born FC	Kenkre FC
Mumbai City FC	PIFA Sports FC	Reliance Foundation Young Champs
North Zone
Garhwal FC	Rajasthan United FC	RoundGlass Punjab FC
Sudeva Delhi FC		
South Zone
Bengaluru FC	FC Bengaluru United	Chennaiyin FC
Kickstart FC	FC Mangalore	Mohammden Sporting FC
Roots FC	Sreenidi Deccan	

=== 2024 season ===
57 Teams were divided into 8 zones for the regional qualifiers, each containing 5–9 teams.

Clubs
East Zone
Adamas United SA	East Bengal FC	Jamshedpur FC
Kalighat Milan Sangha	Mohammedan SC	Mohun Bagan SG
Odisha FC	United SC	
Goa Zone
Dempo SC	FC Goa	FC Mardol
Geno FC	Pax of Nagoa SC	SESA FA
Siddheshwar SCC	Sporting Goa	
Kerala Zone
Gokulam Kerala	Kerala Blasters	Kovalam FC
LiFFA	Muthoot FA	Parappur FC
SAI Kollam	Wayanad United FC	
Meghalaya-Assam Zone
4 for all FA	Little Stars Academy	Mawlai SC
NorthEast United FC	Pay for right FA	Shillong Lajong FC
Mizoram Zone
1st Bn MAP Football Academy	Home Missions FC	Inkhel FC
Kulikawn FC	Muthi FC	
Mumbai Zone
Community Football Club India	Glorious Mothers FC	India Rush Soccer Club
Iron Born FC	Kenkre FC	Millat
Mumbai City	Oranje	RFYC
North Zone
AIPL FC	Delhi FC	Punjab FC
Rajasthan United FC	Sudeva Delhi FC	ZINC FA
South Zone
Bengaluru FC	Chennaiyin FC	Kickstart FC
Rebels FC	Roots FC	Snipers FC
Sreenidi Deccan		

== Performance ==
Club	Titles	Runners-up	Third place	Winning seasons	Runners-up seasons	Third place seasons
Bengaluru	3	0	0	2022, 2023, 2025–26	—N/a	—N/a
Mohun Bagan	1	0	1	2024–25	—N/a	2023
Punjab	1	0	1	2024	—N/a	2025–26
FC Goa	0	1	1	—N/a	2025–26	2024–25
Kerala Blasters	0	1	0	—N/a	2022	—N/a
Sudeva Delhi	0	1	0	—N/a	2023	—N/a
East Bengal	0	1	0	—N/a	2024	—N/a
Classic FA	0	1	0	—N/a	2024–25	—N/a
Hyderabad	0	0	1	—N/a	—N/a	2022
Muthoot FA	0	0	1	—N/a	—N/a	2024

== See also ==
- Junior National Football Championship
- Football in India
- Indian football league system
- Youth League
- History of Indian football
- Indian Arrows
- AIFF Elite Academy
- Subroto Cup
