= Punjab FC Reserves and Academy =

Reserve team and youth system of Punjab FC

Punjab Reserves
- Full name: Punjab Football Club Reserves and Academy
- Nickname: The Shers
- Short name: PFC
- Founded: 2020; 6 years ago
- Ground: Tau Devi Lal Stadium; Guru Nanak Stadium
- Capacity: 12,000; 30,000
- Owner: RoundGlass Foundation
- League: Punjab State Super Football League (Reserves); Punjab Youth Football League; Youth League (Academy)
- Website: thepunjabfc.com
Home colours	Away colours	Third colours

Punjab FC Reserves and Academy are the youth teams of Punjab FC, founded in Mohali, Punjab.

== History ==
RoundGlass Punjab FC was incorporated after the Roundglass Sports Pvt. Ltd. acquired 100% ownership stake of Punjab FC in 2020. Club's youth section was at first incorporated from Minerva Academy FC players, known as one of best national football academies for years.

== Honours ==
=== Reserves ===
- Punjab Super League
  - Champions (2): 2022–23, 2025-26
  - Runners-up (1): 2024-25
- Mastuana Sahib Football Tournament
  - Champions (3): 2023,2024,2025
- All India Principal Harbhajan Singh Memorial Cup
  - Champions (1): 2025
- Sarabha Gold Cup Football Tournament
  - Runners-up (1): 2025
- Oil India Gold Cup
  - Champions (1): 2026

=== Academy ===
- AIFF Elite Youth League
  - Winners (2): 2024–25, 2025–26
- Reliance Foundation Development League
  - Winners (1): 2024
- AIFF Junior League (U-15)
  - Winners (2): 2024-25, 2025-26
- JSW U-18 Youth Cup
  - Winners (1): 2022
- JSW U-13 Youth Cup
  - Winners (1): 2023
  - Runners-up (1): 2022
- KBN Youth Cup
  - Winners (1): 2022
- Administrator's Challenge Cup
  - Champions (1): 2022
- Premier League Next Gen Cup
  - Third place (1): 2024
- All India Principal Harbhajan Singh Memorial Cup (U-17 Category)
  - Champions (1): 2023
  - Runners-up (2): 2024, 2025
- Dream Sports Championship (U-17)
  - Champions (2): 2024, 2025
- Mastuana Sahib Football Tournament
  - Runners-up (1): 2025
