= Mumbai City FC Reserves and Academy =

Indian association football club

Mumbai City Reserves
- Full name: Mumbai City FC Reserves and Academy
- Nickname: The Islanders
- Ground: Mumbai Football Arena
- Capacity: 6,600
- Owner(s): City Football Group (65%); Mumbai City Football India Private Limited: (35%); Ranbir Kapoor (18%); Bimal Parekh (17%)
- Head coach: Mohan Dass
- League: Reliance Foundation Development League; Mumbai Football League
- Website: http://www.mumbaicityfc.com
Home colours	Away colours

Mumbai City FC Reserves and Academy is the reserve side and youth setup of Mumbai City. As of the 2023–24 season, the reserve team competes in the Reliance Foundation Development League and the Mumbai Football League.

== History ==
After several seasons of gradual expansion, the I-League announced that its 2nd Division would incorporate the reserve sides of seven of the ten ISL sides for the 2017–18 season, with no right of promotion for the ISL reserve sides. Mumbai City FC elected not take up the opportunity and were one of the three sides not represented. Two years later, Mumbai City were announced to be entering a team in the 2019–20 competition. In 2022, AIFF and FSDL the governing body of Indian Super League announced that they are introducing a new development league to develop country's young players and it was said that the reserve side of each Indian Super League club will participate in this newly introduced reserve league. From 2021 to 2022 season, the reserve side of Mumbai City participates in this league.

== Reserves ==
As of 15 April 2022

Note: Flags indicate national team as defined under FIFA eligibility rules; some limited exceptions apply. Players may hold more than one non-FIFA nationality.

No.	Pos.	Nation	Player
1	GK	IND	Manav Baraskar
2	DF	IND	Sheldon D'souza
3	DF	IND	Advait Rai
4	DF	IND	Mohammed Kaif Khan
5	MF	IND	Kevin D'Souza
6	DF	IND	Pratham Ghatnur
7	FW	IND	Sarvesh Bangar
8	MF	IND	Nakul Shelke
9	MF	IND	Keegan Pinto
10	MF	IND	Shreyas Vatekar
11	MF	IND	Vincent Rayan
12	FW	IND	Bhuvnesh Shendre

No.	Pos.	Nation	Player
13	DF	IND	Gautam Virwani
14	DF	IND	Yash Vanveru
15	DF	IND	Twain Fernandez
16	FW	IND	Aryan Vinod
17	MF	IND	Pranav Pillai
18	MF	IND	Nolen Pinto
19	FW	IND	Aman CK
20	FW	IND	Aman Sayyed
21	MF	IND	Kuivao Ruivah
25	DF	IND	Umer Muhthar KP
30	GK	IND	Nishit Shetty
31	GK	IND	Vishal Lama

=== Other players under contract ===
Note: Flags indicate national team as defined under FIFA eligibility rules; some limited exceptions apply. Players may hold more than one non-FIFA nationality.

No.	Pos.	Nation	Player
29	FW	IND	Gaurav Swaminathan
32	MF	IND	Karsten Joshua D'Souza
33	FW	IND	Ashley Alban Koli

No.	Pos.	Nation	Player
34	FW	IND	Aashish Lalge
35	DF	IND	Nascimanto Alfanso Santiago

== Under-19s ==
As of 28 August 2023

Note: Flags indicate national team as defined under FIFA eligibility rules; some limited exceptions apply. Players may hold more than one non-FIFA nationality.

No.	Pos.	Nation	Player
1	GK	IND	Kamran Shaikh
2	DF	IND	Tanush Pandey
3	DF	IND	Arsh Bagwan
4	DF	IND	Sharry Miki Singh
5	DF	IND	Nikhil Shinde
6	MF	IND	Eashan Sartape
7	FW	IND	Omkar Talkar
8	DF	IND	Steiner D'Souza
10	MF	IND	Aadil Sheikh
11	FW	IND	Kunal Raghav

No.	Pos.	Nation	Player
12	FW	IND	Harsh Patil
14	FW	IND	Mohammed Jaffer Mansoori
15	DF	IND	Parvez Shah
16	MF	IND	Reagan Pereira
17	FW	IND	Divyang Sheram
18	MF	IND	Kshitij Maral
19	FW	IND	Sayyam Desai
21	DF	IND	Atharva Aher
23	GK	IND	Shaury Sharma
24	GK	IND	Harsh Kadam

== Honours ==
=== Domestic ===
- MFA Independence Cup
  - Champions (1): 2022
- Nadkarni Cup
  - Runner-Up (1) : 2024
- WIFA Youth League U13
  - Champions (1): 2023
- MFA Yuva President's League U15
  - Champions (1): 2023
- DPDL Mumbai U14
  - Champions (1): 2023
- DPDL Mumbai U12
  - Champions (1): 2023

== See also ==
- Mumbai City FC
