= Reliance Foundation Youth Sports =

Program promoting youth sports in India

- Inaugurated: August 2016 to February 2017
- Founder and Chairperson: Nita Ambani
- Website: www.rfyouthsports.com

Reliance Foundation Youth Sports (RFYS) is a program spearheaded by the Reliance Foundation, the non-profit and CSR arm of Reliance Industries. It focuses on promoting youth sports in India, particularly at the school and collegiate levels. Currently, eight cities are participating in this initiative, with the long-term goal of creating a sports association similar to the NCAA in the United States. In 2015, the Reliance Foundation also launched Reliance Foundation Young Champs (RFYC), a program to develop football talent in India. The program is linked to the eight cities participating in the Indian Super League, and the respective teams conduct grassroots initiatives to support RFYC.

== Launch ==
Reliance Foundation Youth Sports was digitally launched on 23 July 2016 by Narendra Modi, the current Prime Minister of India. The launch was live-streamed on the official website. The Prime Minister also interacted with young footballers from eight cities via video conference.

== Reliance Foundation Young Champs ==
Reliance Foundation Young Champs
- Full name: Reliance Foundation Young Champs Academy
- Short name: RFYC
- Founded: 2015; 11 years ago
- Owner: Nita Ambani
- League: Mumbai Premier League; Reliance Foundation Development League
- Website: https://www.rfyoungchamps.org/

Reliance Foundation Young Champs (RFYC) is an academy launched in 2015 to provide a pathway for talented young players across India to build successful professional careers in football. In July 2020, the academy based at Navi Mumbai conferred the Two-Star Academy status by the Asian Football Confederation. In October 2020, the first ever batch graduated from the academy and nine among them were signed by various Indian clubs. Aritra Das, Muhammed Basith PT and Birendra Singh were signed by Kerala Blasters while G Balaji and Aqib Nawab joined Chennaiyin FC. The other recruitment consisted Muhammeded Nemil at FC Goa, Thoi Singh at Bengaluru FC, Ayush Chhikara at Mumbai City and Koustav Dutta at Hyderabad FC. Balaji and Nawab's deals are for two years while the other seven players agreed to three-year contracts. They currently participate in the MFA Elite Division.

== Reliance Foundation Development League ==
The Reliance Foundation Development League is India's first U-21 developmental football league organised by Reliance Foundation in technical support with AIFF. A total of eight teams participated in the first tournament which was held in South Goa from 15 April to 12 May 2022. Participants in the league must have been born on or after January 1, 2002. Several Indian Super League reserve teams joined Reliance Foundation Young Champs for the inaugural edition.

== Structure ==
The Indian School College Sports, or ISCS, under the aegis of Reliance Foundation will be the overseeing body for all school and collegiate sports; organizing, promoting and executing championships at all levels. Starting with football in 2016–2017, RFYS focuses on expanding in the coming years by organizing more sporting events.

The RFYS legislative structure has cabinets and committee members consisting of various members from participating schools and colleges, overlooking the process of participation.

== Eligibility ==
Schools and colleges willing to participate in the initiative start by filling the participation form online, available on the official RFYS website. Post enrolment, the institutions are accepted or rejected based on their eligibility criteria. However, in some cases the right to admission remains with the organisers.

== Advisory board ==
RFYS has a six-member advisory board consisting of eminent personalities to guide the thought and growth of this initiative. This board consists of Nita Ambani, Sachin Tendulkar, Leander Paes, Saina Nehwal, Professor Dipak Jain and Ranbir Kapoor.
