= Jamshedpur FC Reserves and Academy =

- Full name: Jamshedpur Football Club Reserves and Academy
- Founded: March 10, 2018; 8 years ago
- Dissolved: 17 August 2026; 1 day ago
- Ground: JRD Tata Sports Complex
- Capacity: 24,424
- Owner: Tata Steel
- Chairman: Chanakya Chaudhary
- Head coach: Kaizad Ambapardiwalla
- Website: www.fcjamshedpur.com
Home colours	Away colours

Jamshedpur Football Club Reserves and Academy was the reserve side and youth tier setup of Indian Super League side Jamshedpur. Based in Jamshedpur, Jharkhand, the side was founded on 10 March 2018 and participated in I-League 2nd Division, the second division of Indian football. Jamshedpur also has academy teams of various age groups which operate under the Tata Football Academy and participate in the Elite League.

== History ==
On 20 February 2018, it was announced by the All India Football Federation, the organizing body for Indian football, that Jamshedpur, along with six other Indian Super League sides, would field a reserve team in the I-League 2nd Division, India's second division football league. The reserve side squad and coaches were then unveiled a few weeks later, on 10 March 2018. Hilal Rasool Parray was confirmed as the reserve side's first head coach. It was also stated that the squad would be composed of players from the Tata Football Academy and five players selected from trials who had played in the local football league, the JSA Premier Division. On 18 May, the Men of Steel announced that they have been granted ICLS Premier 1 license by the All India Football Federation — the governing body of association football in India.

== Statistics and records ==
=== Season-by-season ===
As of 11 March 2018

Season	I-League 2nd Division								Top Scorer	
Season	P	W	D	L	GF	GA	Pts	Position	Player	Goals
2017–18	0	0	0	0	0	0	0	TBD	TBD	TBD

=== Head coaches record ===
As of 11 March 2018

Name	Nationality	From	To	P	W	D	L	GF	GA	Win%
Kundan Chandra	India	20 January 2019	Present		1	1	1	1	1	50.00

== Honours ==
- AIFF U-17 Elite Youth League
  - Runners-up (1): 2025

== See also ==
- Jamshedpur FC
- Tata Football Academy
- Feeder's Centre
- Growth Premier League
