= 2022–23 ATK Mohun Bagan FC season =

Indian football club season

ATK Mohun Bagan
2022–23 season
- Head coach: Juan Ferrando
- Stadium: Vivekananda Yuba Bharati Krirangan
- Indian Super League: 3rd
- CFL Premier Division A: Withdrew
- ISL Playoffs: Champions
- AFC Cup: Inter-zone play-off semi-finalist
- Durand Cup: Group stage
- Super Cup: Group stage
- Top goalscorer: League: Dimitri Petratos (12); All: Dimitri Petratos (13)
- Highest home attendance: 62,542 (vs East Bengal)
- Lowest home attendance: 14,533 (vs Kerala Blasters)
- Average home league attendance: 25,072
- Biggest win: 5–1 v Gokulam Kerala 10 April 2023 Super Cup
- Biggest defeat: 3–0 v Goa (A) 20 November 2022 Indian Super League; 0–3 v Jamshedpur FC 14 April 2023 Super Cup
Home colours	Away colours
- All statistics correct as of 14 April 2023.

The 2022–23 ATK Mohun Bagan FC season was the club's 3rd season in Indian Super League and 133rd season since its establishment in 1889. Due to lengthened schedule of 2022 AFC Cup, the knockout stage is moved to 2022–23 season from 2021–22 season as it is to be played in September 2022. Club also took part in 2022 Durand Cup and 2023 Indian Super Cup. The principle team owner, Sanjeev Goenka, announced after winning the 2023 Indian Super League Final that ATK Mohun Bagan will be rebranded as Mohun Bagan Super Giant from the next season.

== Squad ==
=== First-team squad ===
As of 8 March 2023

Note: Flags indicate national team as defined under FIFA eligibility rules; some limited exceptions apply. Players may hold more than one non-FIFA nationality.

No.	Pos.	Nation	Player
1	GK	IND	Vishal Kaith
2	DF	IND	Sumit Rathi
3	DF	MNE	Slavko Damjanović
5	DF	AUS	Brendan Hamill
8	MF	IRL	Carl McHugh
9	FW	AUS	Dimitri Petratos
10	MF	FRA	Hugo Boumous
11	FW	IND	Manvir Singh
13	MF	IND	Ravi Bahadur Rana
14	MF	IND	Lalrinliana Hnamte
15	DF	IND	Subhasish Bose (2nd captain)
16	MF	IND	Abhishek Suryavanshi
17	FW	IND	Liston Colaco

No.	Pos.	Nation	Player
18	MF	IND	Ningomba Engson Singh
19	FW	IND	Ashique Kuruniyan
20	DF	IND	Pritam Kotal (1st captain)
21	MF	URU	Federico Gallego
22	MF	IND	Deepak Tangri
23	GK	IND	Debnath Mondal
25	FW	IND	Kiyan Nassiri
27	FW	IND	Md. Fardin Ali Molla
29	MF	IND	Ricky Shabong
31	GK	IND	Arsh Anwer Shaikh
32	MF	IND	Lalthathanga Khawlhring
33	MF	IND	Glan Martins
44	DF	IND	Asish Rai

=== Other players under contract ===
As of 8 March 2023

Note: Flags indicate national team as defined under FIFA eligibility rules; some limited exceptions apply. Players may hold more than one non-FIFA nationality.

No.	Pos.	Nation	Player
12	GK	IND	Avilash Paul (Out due to injury)
4	DF	ESP	Tiri (Out due to injury)
7	MF	FIN	Joni Kauko (Out due to injury)
—	DF	GUI	Florentin Pogba (Out due to injury)

=== Reserve squad ===
As of 11 March 2023

Note: Flags indicate national team as defined under FIFA eligibility rules; some limited exceptions apply. Players may hold more than one non-FIFA nationality.

No.	Pos.	Nation	Player
31	GK	IND	Arsh Anwer Shaikh
—	GK	IND	Syed Zahid Hussain Bukhari
41	GK	IND	Abhishek Balowary
51	GK	IND	Nandan Roy
—	DF	IND	Sumit Rathi
77	DF	IND	Ravi Bahadur Rana
12	DF	IND	Brijesh Giri
—	DF	IND	Pritam meetei Sorokhaibam
5	DF	IND	Amandeep
28	DF	IND	Raj Basfore
—	DF	IND	Joshua Rohan Rae
22	DF	IND	Dippendu Biswas
24	DF	IND	Deep Biswas
—	DF	IND	Rahul Kumar
—	DF	IND	Balraj Singh
4	DF	IND	Chandan Yadav
—	MF	IND	Lalrinliana Hnamte
16	MF	IND	Abhishek Suryavanshi

No.	Pos.	Nation	Player
29	MF	IND	Ricky Shabong
6	MF	IND	Sibajit Singh Leimapokpam
—	MF	IND	Babai Jana
9	MF	IND	Akash Mondal
13	MF	IND	Thumsol Tongsin
30	MF	IND	Kaushik Das
—	MF	IND	Shiba Mandi
35	MF	IND	Swarnadip Das
—	MF	IND	Satvik Sharma
—	FW	IND	Kiyan Nassiri
27	FW	IND	Fardin Ali Molla
18	FW	IND	Ningomba Engson Singh
17	FW	IND	Nongdamba Naorem
—	FW	IND	Milan Mandi
11	FW	IND	Uttam Hansda
7	FW	IND	Suhail Ahmad Bhat
10	FW	IND	Loitongbam Taison Singh

== Transfers ==
=== In ===
No.	Pos.	Player	Transferred from	Fee	Date
14	MF	(India) Lalrinliana Hnamte	East Bengal	Free transfer	26 April 2022
30	MF	(India) Pronay Halder	Jamshedpur	Loan return	16 June 2022
44	DF	(India) Ashish Rai	Hyderabad	₹1,30,00,000	20 June 2022
19	FW	(India) Ashique Kuruniyan	Bengaluru	Swap deal	20 June 2022
5	DF	(Australia) Brendan Hamill	(Australia) Melbourne Victory	Undisclosed	23 June 2022
6	DF	(Guinea) Florentin Pogba	(France) Sochaux-Montbéliard	Undisclosed	24 June 2022
1	GK	(India) Vishal Kaith	Free agent	Free transfer	8 July 2022
9	MF	(Australia) Dimitri Petratos	(Saudi Arabia) Al Wehda	Undisclosed	18 July 2022
23	GK	(India) Debnath Mondal	Free agent	Free transfer	17 August 2022
3	DF	(Montenegro) Slavko Damjanović	(Serbia) Novi Pazar	Free transfer	21 December 2022
21	MF	(Uruguay) Federico Gallego	Free agent	Free transfer	31 December 2022
32	MF	(India) Puitea	Kerala Blasters	₹30,00,000	31 December 2022
33	MF	(India) Glan Martins	Goa	Swap deal	23 January 2023

=== Promotion from B team ===
No.	Pos.	Player	Date of birth (Age in years)
18	MF	Ningomba Engson Singh	2 January 2003 (19)
27	FW	Md. Fardin Ali Molla	10 April 2002 (20)
31	GK	Arsh Anwer Sheikh	9 July 2002 (20)
13	MF	Ravi Bahadur Rana	15 October 2002 (20)
16	MF	Abhishek Suryavanshi	12 March 2001 (21)
2	DF	Sumit Rathi	26 August 2001 (21)
25	FW	Kiyan Nassiri	17 November 2000 (22)

=== Out ===
No.	Pos.	Player	Transferred to	Fee	Date
9	FW	(Australia) David Williams	Mumbai City	Contract expiration	28 May 2022
23	MF	(India) Michael Soosairaj	Odisha	Undisclosed	28 May 2022
21	FW	(Fiji) Roy Krishna	Bengaluru	Contract expiration	3 June 2022
27	MF	(India) Sk. Sahil	Jamshedpur	Contract expiation	10 June 2022
19	MF	(India) Bidyananda Singh	None	Contract expiration	12 June 2022
28	GK	(India) Subrata Paul	Jamshedpur	Loan expiration	13 June 2022
33	DF	(India) Prabir Das	Bengaluru	Swap deal	20 June 2022
5	DF	(India) Sandesh Jhingan	Bengaluru	Contract expiration	28 July 2022
3	DF	(India) Ashutosh Mehta	None	Contract terminated (Note: Ashutosh Mehta was suspended for 2 years by Anti-Doping Disciplinary Panel (ADDP) for failing a dope test performed last season.)	2 September 2022
3	DF	(India) Gursimrat Singh Gill	Mumbai City	Undisclosed	2 September 2022
1	GK	(India) Amrinder Singh	Odisha	Contract terminated	8 September 2022
30	MF	(India) Pronay Halder	Jamshedpur	Undisclosed	6 January 2023
24	MF	(India) Lenny Rodrigues	Goa	Swap deal	24 January 2022

== Pre-season ==
6 August 2022 Naihati Gold Cup	ATK Mohun Bagan	2–1	Mohammedan	Naihati, India
17.30 IST	Kauko 68' (pen.), 90+1'	Report	Halder 40' (pen.)	Stadium: Bankimanjali Stadium; Attendance: 7,000; Referee: Pranjal Banerjee; Man of the Match: Joni Kauko (ATK Mohun Bagan)

14 August 2022 Friendly	ATK Mohun Bagan	Cancelled	Chennaiyin	Kolkata, India
18.00 IST		Report		Stadium: Mohun Bagan Ground

== Competitions ==
=== Overview ===
Competition	First match (round)	Latest match (round)	Final position
AFC Cup	7 September 2022 (Inter-zone play-off semi-finals)	7 September 2022 (Inter-zone play-off semi-finals)	Inter-zone play-off semi-finalist
Durand Cup	20 August 2022 (Group stage)	31 August 2022 (Group stage)	3rd of 5
Indian Super League	10 October 2022 (Round 1)	18 March 2023 (Final)	3rd of 11; Champions
Super Cup	10 April 2023 (Group stage)	14 April 2023 (Group stage)	3rd of 4
Play–offs for AFC Cup	3 May 2023	3 May 2023	Winners

Competition	Record							
Competition	Pld	W	D	L	GF	GA	GD	Win %
AFC Cup	1	0	0	1	1	3	−2	0.00
Durand Cup	4	2	1	1	6	4	+2	50.00
Indian Super League	24	13	5	6	28	19	+9	54.17
Super Cup	3	1	0	2	5	5	+0	33.33
play–offs for AFC Cup	1	1	0	0	1	1	+0	100.00
Total	33	17	6	10	41	32	+9	51.52

Last updated: 3 May 2023
Source: Competitions

=== Durand Cup ===
==== Group stage ====
===== Group table =====
Pos	Team	Pld	W	D	L	GF	GA	GD	Pts	Qualification	MCI	RUN	AMB	EAB	INA
1	Mumbai City	4	2	1	1	13	7	+6	7 (Note: Head-to-head points: Mumbai City 4, Rajasthan United 3, Mohun Bagan 1.)	Qualify for the Knockout stage	—	5–1	—	—	4–1
2	Rajasthan United	4	2	1	1	6	7	−1	7	Qualify for the Knockout stage	—	—	—	—	2–0
3	Mohun Bagan (H)	4	2	1	1	6	4	+2	7		1–1	2–3	—	—	2–0
4	East Bengal (H)	4	1	2	1	4	4	0	5		4–3	0–0	0–1	—	0–0
5	Indian Navy	4	0	1	3	1	8	−7	1		—	—	—	—	—

Source: Sportstar
Rules for classification: 1) points; 2) head-to-head points; 3) head-to-head goal difference; 4) goal difference; 5) number of goals scored; 6) drawing of lots
(H) Hosts

===== Matches =====
20 August 2022 1	ATK Mohun Bagan	2–3	Rajasthan United	Kolkata
18.00 IST	Hnamte (yellow card) 41'; Nassiri 43'; Kuruniyan 46'; Rathi (yellow card) 56'	Report	Amangeldiev 45+1'; Fanai 60'; Nikum 90+5'	Stadium: Vivekananda Yuba Bharati Krirangan; Attendance: 2,820; Referee: Crystal John; Man of the Match: Niraj Kumar (Rajasthan United)

24 August 2022 2	ATK Mohun Bagan	1–1	Mumbai City	Kolkata
18.00 IST	Colaco 40'; Boumous (yellow card) 61'	Report	Ranawade (yellow card) 37'; Jahouh (yellow card) 61'; Díaz 77'	Stadium: Vivekananda Yuba Bharati Krirangan; Attendance: 5,661; Referee: Rahul Kumar Gupta; Man of the Match: Liston Colaco (ATK Mohun Bagan)

28 August 2022 6	East Bengal	0–1	ATK Mohun Bagan	Kolkata
18:00 IST	González (yellow card) 90+1'	Report	Boumous (yellow card) 39'; McHugh (yellow card) 45'; Passi 45+3' (o.g.); Rai (yellow card) 47'; Manvir (yellow card) 78'	Stadium: Vivekananda Yuba Bharati Krirangan; Attendance: 61,789; Referee: C R Srikrishna; Man of the Match: Carl McHugh (ATK Mohun Bagan)

31 August 2022 8	ATK Mohun Bagan	2–0	Indian Navy	Kolkata
18.00 IST	Rodrigues 18'; Nassiri 28'; Tangri (yellow card) 39'; Rana (yellow card) 68'; Suryavanshi (yellow card) 90+1'	Report		Stadium: Kishore Bharati Krirangan; Attendance: 5,326; Referee: Lakshay Tushir; Man of the Match: Lenny Rodrigues (ATK Mohun Bagan)

=== 2022 AFC Cup ===
==== Knockout stage ====
===== Match =====
7 September 2022 Inter-zone play-off semi-final	ATK Mohun Bagan (India)	1–3	(Malaysia) Kuala Lumpur City	Kolkata, India
1900 UTC+5:30	Pogba (yellow card) 73'; Md. Fardin Ali Molla 90+1'; Bose (yellow card) 90+2'	Report	Azizi (yellow card) 30'; Josué 60'; Gallifuoco (yellow card) 79'; Aiman 90+2'; Mintah (yellow card) 90+4'; Morales 90+5'	Stadium: Vivekananda Yuba Bharati Krirangan; Attendance: 18,594; Referee: (Saudi Arabia) Khaled Al Teris; Man of the Match: Paulo Josué (Kuala Lumpur City)

=== Indian Super League ===
==== League table ====
Pos	Team	Pld	W	D	L	GF	GA	GD	Pts	Qualification
1	Mumbai City (C)	20	14	4	2	54	21	+33	46	ISL Cup Semi-finals, Playoffs for 2023–24 ACL group stage and 2023–24 ACL group stage (Note: Qualified via winning the Indian club qualifiers for 2023–24 AFC competitions) (Note: It was announced by AIFF that 2022-23 will be the last season in which the defending Cup Winners will wear the Champions badge. Starting from 2023-24 season it will be the defending League Shield Winners that will wear the Champions badge hereafter.)
2	Hyderabad	20	13	3	4	36	16	+20	42	ISL Cup Semi-finals
3	ATK Mohun Bagan (W)	20	10	4	6	24	17	+7	34 (Note: Head-to-head points: ATK Mohun Bagan 3, Bengaluru 3. Head-to-head goal difference: ATK Mohun Bagan 0, Bengaluru 0. Head-to-head goal scored: ATK Mohun Bagan 4, Bengaluru 4. Goal difference: ATK Mohun Bagan +7, Bengaluru +4.)	ISL Cup Knockouts, Playoffs for 2023–24 AFC Cup qualifiers (Note: Qualified via winning the 2023 Indian Super League playoffs) and 2023–24 AFC Cup qualifiers (Note: Qualified via winning the Indian club qualifiers for 2023–24 AFC competitions) (Note: It was announced by AIFF that 2022-23 will be the last season in which the reigning Cup Winners will wear the Champions badge. Starting from 2023-24 season it will be the reigning League Shield Winners that will wear the Champions badge thereafter.)
4	Bengaluru	20	11	1	8	27	23	+4	34	ISL Cup Knockouts
5	Kerala Blasters	20	10	1	9	28	28	0	31	ISL Cup Knockouts
6	Odisha	20	9	3	8	30	32	−2	30	ISL Cup Knockouts, Playoffs for 2023–24 AFC Cup group stage (Note: Qualified via winning the 2023 Super Cup) and 2023–24 AFC Cup group stage (Note: Qualified via winning the Indian club qualifiers for 2023–24 AFC competitions)
7	Goa	20	8	3	9	36	35	+1	27 (Note: Head-to-head points: Goa 3, Chennaiyin 3. Head-to-head goal difference: Goa +1, Chennaiyin -1.)	
8	Chennaiyin	20	7	6	7	36	37	−1	27	
9	East Bengal	20	6	1	13	22	38	−16	19 (Note: Head-to-head points: East Bengal 3, Jamshedpur 3. Head-to-head goal difference: East Bengal +1, Jamshedpur -1.)	
10	Jamshedpur	20	5	4	11	21	32	−11	19	
11	NorthEast United	20	1	2	17	20	55	−35	5	

Source: Indian Super League
Rules for classification: 1) points; 2) head-to-head points; 3) head-to-head goal difference; 4) head-to-head goals scored; 5) goal difference; 6) number of goals scored; 7) fair play ranking; 8) drawing of lots
(C) Champions; (W) ISL Cup winners

==== Result summary ====
Overall								Home						Away					
Pld	W	D	L	GF	GA	GD	Pts	W	D	L	GF	GA	GD	W	D	L	GF	GA	GD
20	10	4	6	24	17	+7	34	7	0	3	14	8	+6	3	4	3	10	9	+1

==== Results by round ====
Round	1	2	3	4	5	6	7	8	9	10	11	12	13	14	15	16	17	18	19	20
Venue	H	A	H	A	H	A	H	A	H	A	A	H	H	A	H	H	A	A	H	A
Result	L	W	W	D	W	L	W	W	W	D	L	W	L	D	W	L	D	L	W	W
Position	9	5	4	6	2	4	4	4	3	3	4	4	4	4	4	4	4	5	3	3

Updated to match(es) played on 28 February 2023. Source: Indian Super League
A = Away; H = Home; W = Win; D = Draw; L = Loss

==== Matches ====
10 October 2022 1	ATK Mohun Bagan	1–2	Chennaiyin	Kolkata, West Bengal
19:30 IST	Manvir 27'	Report	Kamraj (yellow card) 38'; Karikari 64' (pen.); Narayan (yellow card) 79'; Rahim 83'	Stadium: Vivekananda Yuba Bharati Krirangan; Attendance: 22,236; Referee: Crystal John; Man of the Match: Kwame Karikari (Chennaiyin)

16 October 2022 2	Kerala Blasters	2–5	ATK Mohun Bagan	Kochi, Kerala
19:30 IST	Ivan 6'; Harmanjot (yellow card) 46'; Rahul 81'	Report	Petratos 26', 62', 90'; Kauko 38'; Kaith (yellow card) 78'; Rodrigues 88' (yellow card) 89'	Stadium: Jawaharlal Nehru Stadium; Attendance: 34,984; Referee: R Venkatesh; Man of the Match: Dimitri Petratos (ATK Mohun Bagan)

29 October 2022 3	ATK Mohun Bagan	2–0	East Bengal	Kolkata, West Bengal
19:30 IST	Boumous 56'; Manvir 65'	Report	Kyriakou (yellow card) 27'	Stadium: Vivekananda Yuba Bharati Krirangan; Attendance: 62,542; Referee: C. R. Srikrishna; Man of the Match: Hugo Boumous (ATK Mohun Bagan)

6 November 2022 4	Mumbai City	2–2	ATK Mohun Bagan	Mumbai, Maharashtra
19:30 IST	LZ Chhangte 4'; Lachenpa (yellow card) 35'; Jahouh (yellow card) 63'; Griffiths 72'; Stewart (yellow card) 81'	Report	Tangri (yellow card) 40'; Joni Kauko 48'; Lenny (red card) 75'; McHugh 89'	Stadium: Mumbai Football Arena; Attendance: 5,869; Referee: Rowan Arumughan; Man of the Match: Ahmed Jahouh (Mumbai City)

10 November 2022 5	ATK Mohun Bagan	2–1	NorthEast United	Kolkata, West Bengal
19:30 IST	Liston 35'; Petratos (yellow card) 57'; Hamill (yellow card) 78'; Kauko (yellow card) 85'; Subhasish 90'	Report	Jakobsen (yellow card) 52'; Mashoor (yellow card) 58'; Evans (yellow card) 60' (goal) 81'; Gaztañaga (yellow card) 67'	Stadium: Vivekananda Yuba Bharati Krirangan; Attendance: 26,425; Referee: Tejas Nagavenkar; Man of the Match: Subhasish Bose (ATK Mohun Bagan)

20 November 2022 6	Goa	3–0	ATK Mohun Bagan	Margao, Goa
19:30 IST	Brandon Fernandes (yellow card) 22'; Ayush Chhetri (yellow card) 47'; Aibanbha Dohling 50'; Marc Valiente Hernandez (yellow card) 61'; Fares Arnaout 76'; Noah Sadaoui (yellow card) 82' , (goal) 82'	Report	Manvir (yellow card) 21'; Deepak Tangri (yellow card) 22'; Subhasish Bose (yellow card) 45'; Carl McHugh (yellow card) 90+4'	Stadium: Pandit Jawaharlal Nehru Stadium; Referee: Venkatesh R. Man of the Match: Anwar Ali (FC Goa)

26 November 2022 7	ATK Mohun Bagan	1–0	Hyderabad	Kolkata, West Bengal
19:30 IST	Hugo Boumous 11'; Pritam Kotal (yellow card) 18'; Carl McHugh (yellow card) 84'; Hamill (yellow card) 85'	Report	Chinglensana Singh (yellow card) 11'; Hitesh Sharma (yellow card) 41'; Odei Onaindia Zabala (yellow card) 85'; Javier Siverio (yellow card) 90+'	Stadium: Vivekananda Yuba Bharati Krirangan; Attendance: 26,493; Referee: Kundu H. Man of the Match: Subhasish Bose (Mohun Bagan)

3 December 2022 8	Bengaluru	0–1	ATK Mohun Bagan	Bangalore, Karnataka
19:30 IST		Report	Hamill (yellow card) 40'; Dimitri Petratos 66'; Lenny Rodrigues (yellow card) 76'; Subhasish Bose (yellow card) 82'; Ashique Kuruniyan (yellow card) 90+2'	Stadium: Sree Kanteerava Stadium; Referee: Kanojia A. Man of the Match: Ashique Kuruniyan (Mohun Bagan)

8 December 2022 9	ATK Mohun Bagan	1–0	Jamshedpur	Kolkata, West Bengal
19:30 IST	Ashique Kuruniyan (yellow card) 81'; Hugo Boumous 90+1' (P), (yellow card) 90+4'	Report	Boris Singh (yellow card) 81'; Peter William Hartley (yellow card) 87' (yellow-red card) 89'; Daniel Chima Chukwu (yellow card) 90'	Stadium: Vivekananda Yuba Bharati Krirangan; Attendance: 15,217; Referee: Rahul Kumar Gupta

15 December 2022 10	Odisha	0–0	ATK Mohun Bagan	Bhubaneswar, Odisha
19:30 IST	Sahil Panwar (yellow card) 80'; Narender (yellow card) 90+2'; Pedro Jose Martin Moreno (yellow card) 90+5'	Report	Subhasish Bose (yellow card) 14'; Carl McHugh (yellow card) 80'; Ashique Kuruniyan (yellow card) 89'	Stadium: Kalinga Stadium; Attendance: 7,019; Referee: C. R. Srikrishna; Man of the Match: Narender (Odisha FC)

24 December 2022 11	NorthEast United	1–0	ATK Mohun Bagan	Guwahati, Assam
19:30 IST	Pragyan Sundar Gogoi (yellow card) 34'; Arindam Bhattacharya (yellow card) 56'; Rochharzela (yellow card) 68'; Wilmar Jordan Gil 70'; Gazta (yellow card) 82'	Report		Stadium: Indira Gandhi Athletic Stadium; Attendance: 504; Referee: Aditya Purkayastha; Man of the Match: Wilmar Jordan Gil (Northeast United)

28 December 2022 12	ATK Mohun Bagan	2–1	Goa	Kolkata, West Bengal
19:30 IST	Dimitri Petratos 9'; Hugo Boumous (yellow card) 42', (goal) 52'; Hamill (yellow card) 66'; Lenny Rodrigues (yellow card) 90'	Report	Anwar Ali 25'; Eduardo Bedia Pelaez (yellow card) 69'; Aibanbha Kupar Dohling (yellow card) 84'	Stadium: Vivekananda Yuba Bharati Krirangan; Attendance: 19,873; Referee: Harish Kundu; Man of the Match: Dimitri Petratos (Mohun Bagan)

14 January 2023 13	ATK Mohun Bagan	0-1	Mumbai City	Kolkata, West Bengal
19:30 IST	Ashique Kuruniyan (yellow card) 68'	Report	Rowllin Borges (yellow card) 17'; LZ Chhangte 29'; Vikram Pratap Singh (yellow card) 89'	Stadium: Vivekananda Yuba Bharati Krirangan; Attendance: 29,857; Referee: Tejas Visvasrao Nagvenkar; Man of the Match: LZ Chhangte (Mumbai City FC)

21 January 2023 14	Chennaiyin	0-0	ATK Mohun Bagan	Chennai, Tamil Nadu
19:30 IST	Fallou Diagne (yellow card) 29'; Ajith Kumar K (yellow card) 48'; Julius Vincent Duker (yellow card) 60'	Report	Puitea (yellow card) 11'; Hugo Boumous (yellow card) 26'; Asish Rai (yellow card) 50'	Stadium: Jawaharlal Nehru Stadium; Attendance: 8,489; Referee: Rahul Kumar Gupta; Man of the Match: Julius Vincent Duker (Chennaiyin FC)

28 January 2023 15	ATK Mohun Bagan	2-0	Odisha	Kolkata, West Bengal
19:30 IST	Petratos 3', 80'; Asish Rai (yellow card) 75'; Hugo Boumous (yellow card) 78'; Kuruniyan (red card) 90+4'	Report	Osama Malik (yellow card) 45+2'; Saul Crespo (yellow card) 45+3'; Nikhil Prabhu (yellow card) 64'; Carlos Delgado (yellow card) 90+3'	Stadium: Vivekananda Yuba Bharati Krirangan; Attendance: Crystal John; Referee: 14,950; Man of the Match: Dimitri Petratos (Mohun Bagan)

5 February 2023 16	ATK Mohun Bagan	1-2	Bengaluru	Kolkata, West Bengal
19:30 IST	Pritam Kotal (yellow card) 5'; Kiyan Nassiri (yellow card) 86'; Hamill (yellow card) 88'; Petratos 90+3'; Liston Colaco (yellow card) 90+4'	Report	Suresh Singh Wangjam (yellow card) 30'; Javi Hernández 78'; Roy Krishna 90+1'	Stadium: Vivekananda Yuba Bharati Krirangan; Attendance: 18,594; Referee: Aditya Purkayastha; Man of the Match: Javi Hernández (Bengaluru FC)

9 February 2023 17	Jamshedpur	0-0	ATK Mohun Bagan	Jamshedpur, Jharkhand
19:30 IST	Jitendra Singh (yellow card) 5'	Report	Subhasish Bose (yellow card) 40'; Pritam Kotal (yellow card) 65'; Vishal Kaith (yellow card) 80'	Stadium: JRD Tata Sports Complex; Attendance: 9669; Referee: Umesh Bora; Man of the Match: Jay Thomas (Jamshedpur FC)

14 February 2023 18	Hyderabad	1-0	ATK Mohun Bagan	Hyderabad, Telangana
19:30 IST	Bartholomew Ogbeche 86'; Joel Joseph Chianese (yellow card) 90+5'	Report	Slavko Damjanović (yellow card) 21'	Stadium: G.M.C. Balayogi Athletic Stadium; Attendance: 4873; Referee: C. R. Srikrishna; Man of the Match: Bartholomew Ogbeche (Hyderabad FC)

18 February 2023 19	ATK Mohun Bagan	2-1	Kerala Blasters	Kolkata, West Bengal
19:30 IST	Subhasish Bose (yellow card) 21'; Carl McHugh 23', 71'; Hamill (yellow card) 58'	Report	Dimitrios Diamantakos 16', (yellow card) 49'; Rahul KP (yellow card) 27' (yellow-red card) 64'	Stadium: Vivekananda Yuba Bharati Krirangan; Attendance: 14,533; Referee: Rahul Kumar Gupta; Man of the Match: Carl McHugh (Mohun Bagan)

25 February 2023 20	East Bengal	0-2	ATK Mohun Bagan	Kolkata, West Bengal
19:30 IST	VP Suhair (yellow card) 36'; Alexandre Monterio De Lima (yellow card) 41'; Cleiton Silva (yellow card) 70'; Sumeet Passi (yellow card) 90+1'	Report	Hugo Boumous (yellow card) 38'; Slavko Damjanović 68', (yellow card) 69'; Petratos 90'	Stadium: Vivekananda Yuba Bharati Krirangan; Attendance: 60,102; Referee: Crystal John; Man of the Match: Slavko Damjanović (Mohun Bagan)

=== ISL Playoffs ===
==== Knockout ====
4 March 2023 Knockout	ATK Mohun Bagan	2-0	Odisha	Kolkata, West Bengal
19:30 IST	Hugo Boumous 36'; Dimitri Petratos 58'; Carl McHugh (yellow card) 90+4'	Report	Raynier Fernandes (yellow card) 8'; Saul Crespo Prieto (yellow card) 16'; Sahil Panwar (yellow card) 38'	Stadium: Vivekananda Yuba Bharati Krirangan; Attendance: 35256; Referee: Rahul Kumar Gupta; Man of the Match: Carl McHugh (Mohun Bagan)

==== Semifinals ====
9 March 2023 Leg 1	Hyderabad	0-0	ATK Mohun Bagan	Hyderabad, Telangana
19:30 IST		Report		Stadium: G.M.C. Balayogi Athletic Stadium; Attendance: 12926; Referee: Harish Kundu; Man of the Match: Slavko Damjanović (Mohun Bagan)

13 March 2023 Leg 2	ATK Mohun Bagan	0-0 (0–0 agg.) (4-3 p)	Hyderabad FC	Kolkata, West Bengal
19:30 IST	Pritam Kotal (yellow card) 45+1'; Glan Martins (yellow card) 80'	Report	Joel Joseph Chianese (yellow card) 52'; Sahil Tavora (yellow card) 81'	Stadium: Vivekananda Yuba Bharati Krirangan; Attendance: 52507; Referee: Ramaswamy Srikrishna; Man of the Match: Vishal Kaith
	Penalties
	D. Petratos (penalty scored); F. Gallego (penalty scored); Manvir (penalty scored); Hamill (penalty missed); Pritam (penalty scored)		(penalty scored) João MJT; (penalty missed) Siverio; (penalty missed) Ogbeche; (penalty scored) Danu; (penalty scored) Reagan

==== Final ====
18 March 2023 Final	Bengaluru FC	2–2 (a.e.t.) (3-4 p)	ATK Mohun Bagan	Margao Goa
19:30 IST	Prabir Das (yellow card) 30'; Naorem Roshan Singh (yellow card) 37'; Chhetri (yellow card) 37', (goal) 45+4' (pen.); Krishna 78'; Pérez (yellow card) 118'	Report	Petratos 14' (pen.), 85' (pen.); Carl McHugh (yellow card) 68'; Lalrinliana Hnamte (yellow card) 90+1'	Stadium: Fatorda Stadium; Attendance: 11879; Referee: Harish Kundu; Man of the Match: Petratos
	Penalties
	(penalty scored) Alan Costa; (penalty scored) Krishna; (penalty missed) B. Ramires; (penalty scored) Chhetri; (penalty missed) Pérez		D. Petratos (penalty scored); Liston (penalty scored); Kiyan (penalty scored); Manvir (penalty scored)

=== Super Cup ===
==== Group stage ====
===== Group C =====
Pos	Team	Pld	W	D	L	GF	GA	GD	Pts	Qualification	JAM	FCG	AMB	GOK
1	Jamshedpur	3	3	0	0	11	5	+6	9	Advance to knockout stage	—	—	3–0	3–2
2	Goa	3	2	0	1	5	5	0	6		3–5	—	—	—
3	ATK Mohun Bagan	3	1	0	2	5	5	0	3		—	0–1	—	5–1
4	Gokulam Kerala (H)	3	0	0	3	3	9	−6	0		—	1–0	—	—

Source: AIFF
Rules for classification: 1) points; 2) head-to-head points; 3) head-to-head goal difference; 4) goal difference; 5) number of goals scored; 6) drawing of lots
(H) Hosts

10 April 2023	ATK Mohun Bagan	5–1	Gokulam Kerala	Kozhikode
17.00 IST	Colaco 6', 27'; Boumous 45'; Manvir 63'; Bose (yellow card) 70'; Nassiri 90+3'	Report	Jassim (yellow card) 38'; Mendigutxia 72'; Bouba (yellow card) 87'	Stadium: EMS Stadium; Attendance: 1,743; Referee: Venkatesh R Man of the Match: Liston Colaco (ATK Mohun Bagan)

14 April 2023	Jamshedpur	3–0	ATK Mohun Bagan	Kozhikode
20.30 IST	Boris 22', 43' (yellow card) 66'; Chukwu (yellow card) 33'; Renthlei (yellow card) 58'; Crivellaro (yellow card) 66'; Sabiá (yellow card) 66'; Sawyer 90+3'	Report	Damjanović (yellow card) 36'; Martins (yellow card) 43'	Stadium: EMS Stadium; Attendance: 2,225; Referee: Tejas Visvasrao Nagvenkar; Man of the Match: Pratik Chaudhari (Jamshedpur)

18 April 2023	ATK Mohun Bagan	0–1	Goa	Kozhikode
20:30 IST	McHugh (yellow card) 60'; Martins (yellow card) 62'; Khawlhring (yellow card) 87'	Report	Guarrotxena (yellow card) 12'; Tlang (yellow card) 17'; Arnaout 89'	Stadium: EMS Stadium; Attendance: 2,156; Referee: Rahul Datta; Man of the Match: Fares Arnaout (Goa)

=== Indian Additional Club Qualifiers For AFC Cup ===
3 May 2023	Hyderabad	1–1 (a.e.t.) (1–3 p)	ATK Mohun Bagan	Kozhikode, Kerala
19.00 IST	Reagan (yellow card) 10'; Chinglensana (yellow card) 23'; Chianese 44'; Tavora (yellow card) 61'; João MJT (yellow card) 112'; Mishra (yellow card) 120'	Report	Boumous (yellow card) 6'; Petratos 20', (yellow card) 23'; Damjanović (yellow card) 100'	Stadium: EMS Stadium; Attendance: 750; Referee: Venkatesh R Man of the Match: Carl McHugh (ATK Mohun Bagan)
	Penalties
	João MJT (penalty scored); (penalty missed) Tavora; (penalty missed) Chianese; (penalty missed) Odei		(penalty scored) D. Petratos; (penalty missed) McHugh; (penalty scored) Liston; (penalty scored) Kiyan

== Statistics ==
As of 3 May 2023

=== Appearances ===
Players with no appearances are not included in the list.

Appearances for Mohun Bagan in 2022–23 season
No.	Pos.	Nat.	Name	Durand Cup		Indian Super League		ISL Playoffs		AFC Cup		Super Cup		Hero Club Playoff		Total	
No.	Pos.	Nat.	Name	Apps	Starts	Apps	Starts	Apps	Starts	Apps	Starts	Apps	Starts	Apps	Starts	Apps	Starts
Goalkeepers
1	GK	(India)	Vishal Kaith	3	3	20	20	4	4	1	1	2	2	1	1	31	31
31	GK	(India)	Arsh Anwer Shaikh	2	1	—		1	0	—		1	1	—		4	2
Defenders
2	CB	(India)	Sumit Rathi	2	2	—		1	0	—		2	0	—		5	2
3	CB	(Montenegro)	Slavko Damjanović	—		6	2	4	4	—		3	3	1	0	14	9
4	CB	(Spain)	Tiri	—								2	0	—		2	0
5	CB	(Australia)	Brendan Hamill	1	0	18	18	2	0	1	1	—		1	1	23	20
6	CB	(France)	Florentin Pogba	3	3	2	0	—		1	1	—				6	4
13	RB	(India)	Ravi Rana	2	1	1	0	—								3	1
15	LB	(India)	Subhasish Bose	4	2	19	18	4	4	1	1	3	3	1	1	32	29
20	CB	(India)	Pritam Kotal	4	4	20	20	4	4	1	1	2	2	1	1	33	33
44	RB	(India)	Ashish Rai	3	2	20	20	4	4	1	0	2	2	—		30	28
Midfielders
7	CM	(Finland)	Joni Kauko	3	3	6	6	—		1	1	—				10	10
8	CDM	(Republic of Ireland)	Carl McHugh	3	3	17	12	4	4	1	1	3	3	1	1	29	24
10	AM	(France)	Hugo Boumous	3	3	16	15	4	4	—		3	2	1	1	27	25
14	CDM	(India)	Lalrinliana Hnamte	3	2	9	0	4	0	—		2	1	1	1	19	4
16	CDM	(India)	Abhishek Suryavanshi	1	1	—										1	1
18	CM	(India)	Engson Singh	1	0	—										1	0
21	AM	(Uruguay)	Federico Gallego	—		8	4	4	0	—		3	2	1	0	16	6
22	CDM	(India)	Deepak Tangri	3	3	11	10	—		1	1	—				15	14
24	CDM	(India)	Lenny Rodrigues	2	1	9	3	—								11	4
29	CM	(India)	Ricky Shabong	1	0	1	0	—								2	0
30	CM	(India)	Pronoy Halder	1	0	2	1	—								3	1
32	CDM	(India)	Puitea	—		6	3	2	2	—		2	0	—		10	5
33	CDM	(India)	Glan Martins	—		6	6	2	2	—		2	2	1	1	11	11
Forwards
9	SS/CF	(Australia)	Dimi Petratos	—		19	19	4	4	—		3	2	1	1	27	26
11	RW	(India)	Manvir Singh	4	1	14	14	4	4	1	1	3	2	1	1	27	23
17	LW	(India)	Liston Colaco	3	3	20	15	4	1	1	1	3	3	1	0	32	23
19	LW	(India)	Ashique Kuruniyan	3	3	16	12	2	2	1	1	2	1	1	1	25	20
25	SS/RW	(India)	Kiyan Nassiri	4	2	14	1	2	1	1	0	3	2	1	0	25	6
27	CF	(India)	Fardin Ali Molla	2	1	10	1	—		1	0	—				13	2

=== Goals ===
Rank	No.	Nat.	Name	Durand Cup	Indian Super League	ISL Playoffs	Super Cup	Hero Club Playoff	AFC Cup	Total
1	9	(Australia)	Dimitri Petratos	—	9	3	—	1	—	13
2	10	(France)	Hugo Boumous	—	4	1	1	—	—	6
3	17	(India)	Liston Colaco	1	1	—	2	—	—	4
4	8	(Republic of Ireland)	Carl McHugh	—	3	—	—	—	—	3
4	11	(India)	Manvir Singh	—	2	—	1	—	—	3
4	25	(India)	Kiyan Nassiri	2	—	—	1	—	—	3
5	7	(Finland)	Joni Kauko	—	2	—	—	—	—	2
5	24	(India)	Lenny Rodrigues	1	1	—	—	—	—	2
6	3	(Montenegro)	Slavko Damjanović	—	1	—	—	—	—	1
6	15	(India)	Subhasish Bose	—	1	—	—	—	—	1
6	19	(India)	Ashique Kuruniyan	1	—	—	—	—	—	1
6	27	(India)	Fardin Ali Molla	—	—	—	—	—	1	1
Own Goal(s)				1	—	—	—	—	—	1
Total				6	24	4	5	1	1	41

=== Assists ===
Rank	No.	Nat.	Name	Durand Cup	Indian Super League	ISL Playoffs	Super Cup	Hero Club Playoff	AFC Cup	Total
1	10	(France)	Hugo Boumous	1	4	—	2	1	—	8
2	9	(Australia)	Dimitri Petratos	—	7	—	—	—	—	7
3	11	(India)	Manvir Singh	—	3	1	—	—	—	4
3	17	(India)	Liston Colaco	—	4	—	—	—	—	4
4	19	(India)	Ashique Kuruniyan	1	1	—	—	—	—	2
4	27	(India)	Fardin Ali Molla	2	—	—	—	—	—	2
4	44	(India)	Asish Rai	—	1	—	1	—	—	2
5	8	(Republic of Ireland)	Carl McHugh	—	—	1	—	—	—	1
5	25	(India)	Kiyan Nassiri	—	—	—	1	—	—	1

=== Clean Sheets ===
Rank	No.	Nat.	Name	Durand Cup	Indian Super League	ISL Playoffs	Super Cup	Hero Club Playoff	AFC Cup	Total
1	1	(India)	Vishal Kaith (Note: (ISL Golden Glove))	2	9	3	—			14
2	31	(India)	Arsh Anwer Shaikh	1	—	1	—			2

=== Hat-tricks ===
Player	Against	Result	Date	Competition
(Australia) Dimitri Petratos	Kerala Blasters	2-5	16 October 2022	2022–23 Indian Super League

== Youth team ==
Competition	First match (round)	Latest match (round)	Final position
Reliance Foundation Development League	14 March 2023 (Regional qualifiers)	14 May 2023 (Third place match)	3rd
Next Gen Cup	17 May 2023 (Group stage)	26 May 2023 (Fifth place match)	6th

=== Regional stage (East Region) ===
Pos	Team	Pld	W	D	L	GF	GA	GD	Pts	Qualification
1	East Bengal FC (Q)	10	7	2	1	18	8	+10	23	Qualify for the National group stage
2	Mohun Bagan (Q)	10	6	3	1	19	7	+12	21	Qualify for the National group stage
3	Mohammedan SC	10	3	1	6	11	19	−8	10	
4	United SC	6	3	1	2	7	6	+1	10	
5	Jamshedpur FC	6	2	1	3	10	11	−1	7	
6	Odisha FC	6	2	0	4	9	8	+1	6	
7	New Alipore Suruchi Sangha	6	0	0	6	5	19	−14	0	

Source: RFYS
(Q) Qualified for the phase indicated

14 March 2023 1	Mohammedan SC U21	1-6	Mohun Bagan U21	Naihati, West Bengal
15:00 IST	William Lalgoulien 16 ' Arghya Roy (red card) 85'	Report	Ricky John Shabong 36'; Engson Singh 54'; Md Fardin Ali Molla 57'; Suhail Ahmad Bhat 89', 90+3', 90+7'; Brijesh Giri (yellow card) 90+1'	Stadium: Bankimanjali Stadium; Attendance: 700; Referee: Rohan Das Gupta; Man of the Match: Suhail Bhat (Mohun Bagan)

17 March 2023 2	Mohun Bagan U21	2-0	Odisha FC U21	Kalyani, West Bengal
15:00 IST	Engson Singh 3'; Suhail Ahmad Bhat 69'; Akash Mondal (yellow card) 87'		Rahul Mukhi (yellow card) 46'; Tankadhar Bag (yellow card) 55'; Samir Kerketta (yellow card) 68'	Stadium: Kalyani Stadium; Attendance: 2000; Referee: Bimalendu Mondal; Man of the Match: Brijesh Giri (Mohun Bagan)

20 March 2023 3	Mohun Bagan U21	1-1	United SC 21	Naihati, West Bengal
15:00 IST	Ricky Shabong 13'; Arsh Anwer Shaikh (yellow card) 39'	Report	Subrata Murmu 51'	Stadium: Bankimanjali Stadium; Attendance: 500; Referee: Suvankar Das; Man of the Match: Subrata Murmu (United SC)

23 March 2023 4	East Bengal U21	0-0	Mohun Bagan U21	Naihati, West Bengal
15:00 IST	Tuhin Das (yellow card) 10'	Report	Amandeep (yellow card) 55'; Sumit Rathi (yellow card) 60'	Stadium: Bankimanjali Stadium; Attendance: 4000; Referee: Rabin Biswas; Man of the Match: Aditya Patra (East Bengal)

26 March 2023 5	New Alipore Suruchi Sangha	0-2	Mohun Bagan U21	Naihati, West Bengal
15:00 IST	Bholanath Orao (yellow card) 78'; Samir Bayen (yellow card) 90+2'	Report	Ravi Bahadur Rana (yellow card) 41'; Abhishek Suryavanshi 63' (pen.); Suhail Ahmad Bhat 73'; Amandeep (yellow card) 86'	Stadium: Bankimanjali Stadium; Attendance: 200; Referee: Dipak Singha; Man of the Match: Suhail Ahmad Bhat (Mohun Bagan)

29 March 2023 6	Mohun Bagan U21	2-1	Jamshedpur FC U21	Kalyani, West Bengal
15:00 IST	Suhail Ahmad Bhat 6'; Raj Basfore (yellow card) 23' (red card) 90'; Nongdamba Naorem 29'; Brijesh Giri (yellow card) 53'; Taison Singh (red card) 90'; Arsh Anwar Sheikh (red card) 90'	Report	Nikhil Barla 4'; Amzard Khan (red card) 90'; Pallujam Rohan Singh (red card) 90'	Stadium: Kalyani Stadium; Attendance: 500; Referee: Abhishek Saha

=== Second round ===
7 April 2023 1	Mohun Bagan U21	1 - 1	East Bengal FC U21	Naihati, West Bengal
15:00 IST	Sumit Rathi (yellow card) 38' (yellow-red card) 82'; Ricky John Shabong (yellow card) 45+4'; Fardin Ali Molla 79'	Report	Sourav Biswas (yellow card) 36'; Dip Saha 41'; Rupam Roy (yellow card) 89'	Stadium: Naihati Stadium; Attendance: 6000; Referee: Debabrata Naskar; Man of the Match: Aditya Patra (East Bengal)

14 April 2023 2	Mohammedan SC U21	0-1	Mohun Bagan U21	Barrackpore, West Bengal
15:30 IST	Ganesh Besra (yellow card) 24'	Report	Engson Singh 10'; Rahul Kumar (yellow card) 40'; Fardin Ali Molla (yellow card) 61'; Abhishek Suryawanshi (yellow card) 65'; Syed Zahid Hussain Bukhari (yellow card) 89'	Stadium: Barrackpore Stadium; Attendance: 200; Referee: Kanika Barman; Man of the Match: Engson Singh (Mohun Bagan)

18 April 2023 3	Mohun Bagan U21	4-1	Mohammedan SC U21	Barrackpore, West Bengal
15:30 IST	Engson Singh 19', 35'; Ricky Shabong (yellow card) 45+1', (goal) 47'; Uttam Hansda (yellow card) 75'; Loitongbam Taison Singh 87'; Rahul Kumar (yellow card) 88'	Report	Soyeb Khan 64'	Stadium: Barrackpore Stadium; Attendance: 200; Referee: Suvajit Pranik

21 April 2023 4	East Bengal FC U21	2-0	Mohun Bagan U21	Naihati, West Bengal
15:30 IST	Kush Chhetri 34', 60'; Arpan Polley (yellow card) 37'; Muhammed Roshal (yellow card) 45+2'; Aditya Patra (yellow card) 65'	Report	Ricky Shabong (yellow card) 45+2'; Brijesh Giri (yellow card) 56'; Dippendu Biswas (yellow card) 77'	Stadium: Naihati Stadium; Attendance: 3000; Referee: Tanumoy Sarkar; Man of the Match: Kush Chhetri (Mohun Bagan)

=== National Group stage (Imphal Group) ===
Pos	Team	Pld	W	D	L	GF	GA	GD	Pts	Qualification
1	Mohun Bagan U21 (Q)	3	3	0	0	9	1	+8	9	Next Gen Cup 2023 & National Championship stage
2	Classic Football Academy	3	1	2	0	7	3	+4	5	
3	NorthEast United FC	4	1	2	1	6	6	0	5	
4	SAI-RC	3	0	1	2	2	6	−4	1	
5	Shillong Lajong FC	3	0	1	2	1	9	−8	1	

Source: RFYS
(Q) Qualified for the phase indicated

27 April 2023 1	NorthEast United FC U21	1-2	Mohun Bagan U21	Imphal Manipur
10:00 IST	Khraw Kupar Jana (yellow card) 23'; Nikhil Deka (yellow card) 45+2'; Parthib 90+4'	Report	Loitongbam Taison Singh 3', 63'; Abhishek Suryavanshi (yellow card) 12' (yellow-red card) 48'	Stadium: SAI Complex; Attendance: 500; Referee: Ranjita Devi Tekcham; Man of the Match: Suhail Ahmad Bhat (Mohun Bagan)

30 April 2023 2	ATK Mohun Bagan U21	3-0	SAI-RC	Imphal Manipur
10:00 IST	Engson Singh 46'; Taison Singh 53'; Dippendu Biswas (yellow card) 66'; Suhail Ahmad Bhat 69'; Thumsol Tongsin (yellow card) 69'	Report	Kayenpaibam Robinson Singh (yellow card) 8'; Kharibam Pravananda Meitei (yellow card) 66'	Stadium: SAI Complex; Attendance: 1000; Referee: Joyshing Monsang Thumli; Man of the Match: Engson Singh (Mohun Bagan)

3 May 2023 3	ATK Mohun Bagan U21	4-0	Shillong Lajong FC U21	Imphal Manipur
14:00 IST	Taison Singh 3', 59'; Abhishek Suryavanshi (yellow card) 9'; Nongdamba Naorem 19', 21'; Engson Singh (yellow card) 62'; Sibajit Singh (yellow card) 88'	Report	Rimankhraw Kharumnuid (yellow card) 30'; Badondor Marbaniang (yellow card) 69'; Damonlang Pathaw (yellow card) 88'	Stadium: SAI Complex; Attendance: 1000; Referee: Priyobarta Singh; Man of the Match: Nongdamba Naorem (Mohun Bagan)

6 May 2023 4	Classic Football Academy U19	cancelled	ATK Mohun Bagan U21	Imphal Manipur
14:00 IST				Stadium: SAI Complex

=== National Championship Stage ===
==== Semifinal ====
11 May 2023 SF1	Mohun Bagan U21	1–1 (6–7 p)	Bengaluru U21	Mumbai, Maharashtra
19.00 IST	R. Basfore (yellow card) 5'; Engson (yellow card) 69' (goal) 87'	Report	H. Thoi 61'	Stadium: Reliance Corporate Park; Attendance: 200; Referee: K Ramdasan; Man of the Match: Huidrom Thoi Singh (Bengaluru)
	Penalties
	Suryavanshi (penalty scored); Nassiri (penalty scored); Bhat (penalty scored); Engson (penalty scored); Rana (penalty scored); R. Basfore (penalty scored); T. Tongsin (penalty missed)		C. Fernandes (penalty scored); Akashdeep (penalty scored); Harpreet (penalty scored); Harmanpreet (penalty scored); H. Thoi (penalty scored); Lyngdoh (penalty scored); Ketkar (penalty scored)

==== Third place ====
14 May 2023	Mohun Bagan U21	5–1	RFYC U20	Mumbai, Maharashtra
08:00 IST	Nassiri 18'; Giri 58'; Uttam Hansda 68'; Dippendu Biswas 89'; Amandeep 90+2'	Report	S. Mohammed K 26' (yellow card) 65'	Stadium: Reliance Corporate Park; Attendance: 10; Referee: Akashkumar Kamleshkumar Mehta; Man of the Match: Kiyan Nassiri (Mohun Bagan)

==== Appearances ====
Players with no appearances are not included in the list.

As of 14 May 2023

Appearances for Mohun Bagan in RFDL 2023 season
No.	Pos.	Nat.	Name	Regional		Zonal		National Group		National Championship		Total	
No.	Pos.	Nat.	Name	Apps	Starts	Apps	Starts	Apps	Starts	Apps	Starts	Apps	Starts
Goalkeepers
1	GK	(India)	Syed Zahid Hussain	—		3	3	3	3	1	1	7	7
31	GK	(India)	Arsh Anwar Sheikh	5	5	1	1	—		—		6	6
41	GK	(India)	Abhishek Balowary	1	1	1	0	—		1	1	3	2
Defenders
2	DF	(India)	Sumit Rathi	1	1	1	0	—		—		2	2
4	DF	(India)	Chandan Yadav	—		—		2	0	—		2	0
5	DF	(India)	Amandeep	6	6	3	3	3	3	2	2	14	14
12	DF	(India)	Brijesh Giri	6	5	3	3	2	0	2	1	13	9
20	DF	(India)	Rahul Kumar	—		1	1	—		—		1	1
22	DF	(India)	Dippendu Biswas	2	0	2	1	3	3	2	2	9	6
28	DF	(India)	Raj Basfore	6	6	3	3	3	3	2	2	14	14
77	DF	(India)	Ravi Bahadur Rana	6	6	4	4	3	3	2	2	15	15
Midfielders
6	MF	(India)	Sibajit Singh	4	3	3	1	3	3	2	2	12	9
9	MF	(India)	Akash Mondal	3	1	1	0	—		—		4	1
10	MF	(India)	Taison Singh	5	2	2	1	3	3	1	1	11	7
13	MF	(India)	Thumsol Tongsin	4	1	—		3	1	2	1	9	3
14	MF	(India)	Sibajit Singh	1	1	—		—		—		1	1
16	MF	(India)	Abhishek Suryavanshi	6	6	4	4	2	2	2	1	14	13
29	MF	(India)	Ricky Shabong	6	6	4	4	—		—		10	10
30	MF	(India)	Kaushik Das	2	0	2	0	1	0	1	0	6	0
30	MF	(India)	Swarnadip Das	2	0	1	0	1	0	1	0	5	0
Forwards
7	LW	(India)	Suhail Ahmad Bhat	6	2	3	3	3	3	2	2	14	10
11	LW	(India)	Uttam Hansda	3	0	3	0	3	0	2	0	11	10
17	LW	(India)	Nongdamba Singh Naorem	6	2	3	3	3	3	2	1	14	9
18	LW	(India)	Engson Singh	6	6	3	3	3	3	2	2	14	14
25	LW	(India)	Kiyan Nassiri	1	1	1	1	—		2	1	4	3
26	LW	(India)	Milan Mandi	1	0	2	0	2	0	—		5	0
27	LW	(India)	Fardin Ali Molla	5	5	3	3	—		—		8	8

=== Group stage ===
==== Group A ====
Pos	Team	Pld	W	D	L	GF	GA	GD	Pts	Qualification
1	(South Africa) Stellenbosch FC	2	2	0	0	3	0	+3	6	Final
2	(England) West Ham United	2	1	1	0	5	1	+4	4	Third place match
3	(India) ATK Mohun Bagan	2	0	1	1	3	1	+2	1	Fifth place match
4	(India) Bengaluru	2	0	0	2	0	5	−5	0	Seventh place match

Source: RFDL, PL

17 May 2023	(England) West Ham United U19	1-1	(India) ATK Mohun Bagan U21	Mumbai, Maharashtra
16:00 IST	Favour Fawunmi 63'		Suhail Ahmad Bhat 9'	Stadium: Reliance Corporate Park

20 May 2023	(India) ATK Mohun Bagan U21	0-2	(South Africa) Stellenbosch FC U21	Mumbai, Maharashtra
20:00IST				Stadium: Reliance Corporate Park

23 May 2023	(India) ATK Mohun Bagan U21	0-0	(India) Bengaluru U21	Mumbai, Maharashtra
16:00IST				Stadium: Reliance Corporate Park

=== Fifth-Place Playoff ===
25 May 2023	(India) ATK Mohun Bagan U21	0-4	(India) RFYC U20	Mumbai, Maharashtra
IST				Stadium: Reliance Corporate Park

=== Stats ===
Position	Name	Matches	Goals
1	(India) Suhail Bhat	15	8
2	(India) Ningomba Engson Singh	15	7
3	(India) Loitongbam Taison Singh	10	6
4	(India) Ricky Shabong	13	3
4	(India) Nongdamba Naorem	10	3
5	(India) Fardin Ali Molla	10	2
6	(India) Abhishek Suryavanshi	15	1
6	(India) Brijesh Giri	9	1
6	(India) Kiyan Nassiri	11	1
6	(India) Uttam Hansda	3	1
6	(India) Amandeep	8	1
6	(India) Dippendu Biswas	9	1

Position	Name	Matches	Clean sheet
1	(India) Syed Zahid Hussain Bukhari	8	3
2	(India) Arsh Anwer Shaikh	7	2
3	(India) Abhishek Balowary	1	1

=== Hat-tricks ===
Player	Against	Result	Date	Competition
(India) Suhail Bhat	Mohammedan SC	1–6	14 March	2023 Reliance Foundation Development League
