= 2023 Reliance Foundation Development League =

Second season of RFDL

Reliance Foundation Development League
- Season: 2023
- Dates: 27 February – 14 May
- Champions: Bengaluru FC (2nd title)
- Next Gen Cup: Bengaluru FC; Sudeva Delhi; Mohun Bagan SG; RFYC
- Matches: 42
- Goals: 148 (3.52 per match)
- Best Player: Thoi Singh (Bengaluru)
- Top goalscorer: Taison Singh (Mohun Bagan SG) (5 goals)
- Best goalkeeper: Sachin Jha (Sudeva Delhi)

The 2023 Reliance Foundation Development League was the second season of the Reliance Foundation Development League, developmental football league organised by the Reliance Foundation and the AIFF. The season features 59 teams divided into nine regions, each playing around 10 matches during the regional qualifiers held across multiple regions from 27 February to 23 April. 4 teams qualified for the Next Gen Cup to be held in Mumbai.

Bengaluru FC successfully defended their title against Sudeva Delhi FC in the final. Both teams, including Mohun Bagan SG and RFYC, qualified for the Next Gen Cup.

== Background ==
Reliance Foundation Youth Sports announced the second season of the RFDL to be started from 27 February with regional qualifiers in Kerala.

== Format ==
The teams would predominantly feature U-21 players, with few overage players allowed as well. Participants in the league must have been born on or after January 1, 2002. Each team will play at least 10 matches in the regional qualifiers. A total of 250+ matches will be played in entire league. 20 teams will qualify for the National group stage from the regional qualifiers. The top-four teams will play the National Championship Stage and the 2023 Next Gen Cup.

== Teams ==
Teams are divided into 9 zones for the regional qualifiers, each containing 4–8 teams.

State/Region	Venue	Clubs
Assam-Meghalaya	Meghalaya Football Ground, Shillong	Malki SC
Assam-Meghalaya	Meghalaya Football Ground, Shillong	Mawlai SC
Assam-Meghalaya	Meghalaya Football Ground, Shillong	NorthEast United FC
Assam-Meghalaya	Meghalaya Football Ground, Shillong	Rangdajied United FC
Assam-Meghalaya	Meghalaya Football Ground, Shillong	Ryntih FC
Assam-Meghalaya	Meghalaya Football Ground, Shillong	Shillong Lajong FC
East	Barrackpore Stadium, Barrackpore; Kalyani Stadium, Kalyani; Naihati Stadium, Naihati	Mohun Bagan SG
East	Barrackpore Stadium, Barrackpore; Kalyani Stadium, Kalyani; Naihati Stadium, Naihati	East Bengal FC
East	Barrackpore Stadium, Barrackpore; Kalyani Stadium, Kalyani; Naihati Stadium, Naihati	Jamshedpur FC
East	Barrackpore Stadium, Barrackpore; Kalyani Stadium, Kalyani; Naihati Stadium, Naihati	Mohammedan SC
East	Barrackpore Stadium, Barrackpore; Kalyani Stadium, Kalyani; Naihati Stadium, Naihati	New Alipore Suruchi Sangha
East	Barrackpore Stadium, Barrackpore; Kalyani Stadium, Kalyani; Naihati Stadium, Naihati	Odisha FC
East	Barrackpore Stadium, Barrackpore; Kalyani Stadium, Kalyani; Naihati Stadium, Naihati	United SC
Goa	Monte de Guirim Ground, Guirim; SESA Football Ground, Sirsaim; Dempo Academy Ground, Ella	Churchill Brothers FC Goa
Goa	Monte de Guirim Ground, Guirim; SESA Football Ground, Sirsaim; Dempo Academy Ground, Ella	Dempo SC
Goa	Monte de Guirim Ground, Guirim; SESA Football Ground, Sirsaim; Dempo Academy Ground, Ella	FC Goa
Goa	Monte de Guirim Ground, Guirim; SESA Football Ground, Sirsaim; Dempo Academy Ground, Ella	Salgaocar FC
Goa	Monte de Guirim Ground, Guirim; SESA Football Ground, Sirsaim; Dempo Academy Ground, Ella	SESA FA
Goa	Monte de Guirim Ground, Guirim; SESA Football Ground, Sirsaim; Dempo Academy Ground, Ella	Velsao SCC
Kerala	Maharajas College Stadium, Ernakulam; Panampilly Ground, Kochi	FC Areekode
Kerala	Maharajas College Stadium, Ernakulam; Panampilly Ground, Kochi	Gokulam Kerala FC
Kerala	Maharajas College Stadium, Ernakulam; Panampilly Ground, Kochi	FC Kerala
Kerala	Maharajas College Stadium, Ernakulam; Panampilly Ground, Kochi	Kerala Blasters FC
Kerala	Maharajas College Stadium, Ernakulam; Panampilly Ground, Kochi	Kovalam FC
Kerala	Maharajas College Stadium, Ernakulam; Panampilly Ground, Kochi	LIFFA
Kerala	Maharajas College Stadium, Ernakulam; Panampilly Ground, Kochi	Muthoot FA
Kerala	Maharajas College Stadium, Ernakulam; Panampilly Ground, Kochi	Parappur FC
Manipur	Loitang Football Arena, Imphal; Artificial Turf Ground, Lamlong Thongkhong; SAI Ground, Takyel	Classic FA
Manipur	Loitang Football Arena, Imphal; Artificial Turf Ground, Lamlong Thongkhong; SAI Ground, Takyel	Football 4 Change Academy
Manipur	Loitang Football Arena, Imphal; Artificial Turf Ground, Lamlong Thongkhong; SAI Ground, Takyel	North Eastern Sporting Union
Manipur	Loitang Football Arena, Imphal; Artificial Turf Ground, Lamlong Thongkhong; SAI Ground, Takyel	Pehlum Lamhil Lawm
Manipur	Loitang Football Arena, Imphal; Artificial Turf Ground, Lamlong Thongkhong; SAI Ground, Takyel	Poloi FC
Manipur	Loitang Football Arena, Imphal; Artificial Turf Ground, Lamlong Thongkhong; SAI Ground, Takyel	SAI-RC
Manipur	Loitang Football Arena, Imphal; Artificial Turf Ground, Lamlong Thongkhong; SAI Ground, Takyel	Social Development Club
Manipur	Loitang Football Arena, Imphal; Artificial Turf Ground, Lamlong Thongkhong; SAI Ground, Takyel	Wangoi FA
Mizoram	Rajiv Gandhi Stadium, Aizawl; AR Lammual, Aizawl	1st Bn MAP Football Academy
Mizoram	Rajiv Gandhi Stadium, Aizawl; AR Lammual, Aizawl	Chanmari FC
Mizoram	Rajiv Gandhi Stadium, Aizawl; AR Lammual, Aizawl	Chanmari West FC
Mizoram	Rajiv Gandhi Stadium, Aizawl; AR Lammual, Aizawl	Chawnpui FC
Mizoram	Rajiv Gandhi Stadium, Aizawl; AR Lammual, Aizawl	Ramthar Veng FC
Mizoram	Rajiv Gandhi Stadium, Aizawl; AR Lammual, Aizawl	SYS Football Club
Mumbai	Neville D'Souza Football Turf, Bandra	India Rush Soccer Club
Mumbai	Neville D'Souza Football Turf, Bandra	Iron Born FC
Mumbai	Neville D'Souza Football Turf, Bandra	Kenkre FC
Mumbai	Neville D'Souza Football Turf, Bandra	Mumbai City FC
Mumbai	Neville D'Souza Football Turf, Bandra	PIFA Sports FC
Mumbai	Neville D'Souza Football Turf, Bandra	Reliance Foundation Young Champs
North	21 Raj Niwas, Civil Lines, Delhi	Garhwal FC
North	21 Raj Niwas, Civil Lines, Delhi	Rajasthan United FC
North	21 Raj Niwas, Civil Lines, Delhi	RoundGlass Punjab FC
North	21 Raj Niwas, Civil Lines, Delhi	Sudeva Delhi FC
South	Bangalore Football Stadium, Bengaluru	Bengaluru FC
South	Bangalore Football Stadium, Bengaluru	FC Bengaluru United
South	Bangalore Football Stadium, Bengaluru	Chennaiyin FC
South	Bangalore Football Stadium, Bengaluru	Kickstart FC
South	Bangalore Football Stadium, Bengaluru	FC Mangalore
South	Bangalore Football Stadium, Bengaluru	Mohammden Sporting FC
South	Bangalore Football Stadium, Bengaluru	Roots FC
South	Bangalore Football Stadium, Bengaluru	Sreenidi Deccan

== Regional stage ==
=== Assam-Meghalaya region ===
Pos	Team	Pld	W	D	L	GF	GA	GD	Pts	Qualification
1	Shillong Lajong	10	7	3	0	32	6	+26	24	Advance to National group stage
2	NorthEast United	10	7	3	0	25	5	+20	24	Advance to National group stage
3	Rangdajied United	10	5	3	2	17	5	+12	18	
4	Ryntih FC	10	2	2	6	12	19	−7	8	
5	Malki SC	10	2	0	8	12	37	−25	6	
6	Mawlai SC	10	1	1	8	6	32	−26	4	

Source: RFYS

==== Top scorers ====
Rank	Player	Club	Goals
1	Alfred Lalroutsang	NorthEast United	12
2	Samchaphrang Lato	Shillong Lajong	6
2	Freddy Jyrwa	Malki SC	6
4	Mebannangkiew Thabah	Shillong Lajong	4
4	Parthib Gogoi	NorthEast United	4

=== East region ===
Pos	Team	Pld	W	D	L	GF	GA	GD	Pts	Qualification
1	East Bengal	10	7	2	1	18	8	+10	23	Advance to National group stage
2	Mohun Bagan SG	10	6	3	1	19	7	+12	21	Advance to National group stage
3	Mohammedan	10	3	1	6	11	20	−9	10	
4	United SC	6	3	1	2	7	6	+1	10	
5	Jamshedpur	6	2	1	3	10	11	−1	7	
6	Odisha	6	2	0	4	9	8	+1	6	
7	NA Suruchi Sangha	6	0	0	6	5	19	−14	0	

Source: RFYS

==== Top scorers ====
Rank	Player	Club	Goals
1	William Lalgoulien	Mohammedan	6
1	Suhail Bhat	Mohun Bagan SG	6
3	Ningomba Engson Singh	Mohun Bagan SG	5
4	Muhammed Roshal PP	East Bengal	4
4	Surajit Ghosh	United SC	4

=== Goa region ===
Pos	Team	Pld	W	D	L	GF	GA	GD	Pts	Qualification
1	FC Goa	10	8	2	0	19	3	+16	26	Advance to National group stage
2	Velsao S&CC	10	5	2	3	9	13	−4	17	Advance to National group stage
3	Dempo SC	10	4	3	3	16	11	+5	15	
4	SESA FA	10	3	3	4	8	10	−2	12	
5	Salgaocar FC	10	2	2	6	11	14	−3	8	
6	Churchill Brothers	10	1	2	7	8	20	−12	5	

Source: RFYS

==== Top scorers ====
Rank	Player	Club	Goals
1	Saish Gaunkar	FC Goa	4
2	Necio Maristo Fernandes	Dempo SC	3
2	Laximanrao Rane	Dempo SC	3
2	Shrine Clemente	Churchill Brothers	3
2	Laitonjam Lemba Singh	FC Goa	3

=== Kerala region ===
Pos	Team	Pld	W	D	L	GF	GA	GD	Pts	Qualification
1	Muthoot FA	10	8	1	1	23	6	+17	25	Advance to National group stage
2	LiFFA	10	7	1	2	18	7	+11	22	Advance to National group stage
3	Kerala Blasters	10	6	2	2	25	12	+13	20	Advance to National group stage
4	Kovalam FC	10	3	0	7	9	22	−13	9	
5	Parappur FC	7	2	2	3	12	6	+6	8	
6	Gokulam Kerala	7	2	2	3	12	13	−1	8	
7	FC Areekode	7	1	0	6	4	18	−14	3	
8	FC Kerala	7	1	0	6	5	24	−19	3	

Source: RFYS

==== Top scorers ====
Rank	Player	Club	Goals
1	Salahudheen Adnan K	Muthoot FA	7
2	Muhammad Ajsal	Kerala Blasters	6
3	Saivin Ericson E	LiFFA	5
4	Vineeth A	LiFFA	4
4	Naresh Bhagyanathan	Muthoot FA	4

=== Manipur region ===
Pos	Team	Pld	W	D	L	GF	GA	GD	Pts	Qualification
1	Classic FA	10	7	2	1	31	3	+28	23	Advance to National group stage
2	SAI-RC	10	5	3	2	17	15	+2	18	Advance to National group stage
3	North Eastern Sporting Union	10	6	0	4	30	13	+17	18	
4	Wangoi FA	10	4	0	6	17	34	−17	12	
5	Football 4 Change Academy	7	3	3	1	14	7	+7	12	
6	Poloi FC	7	1	2	4	10	14	−4	5	
7	Pehlum Lamhil Lawm	7	1	1	5	13	22	−9	4	
8	Social Development Club	7	1	1	5	4	28	−24	4	

Source: RFYS

==== Top scorers ====
Rank	Player	Club	Goals
1	Kharibam Meitei	SAI-RC	10
1	Serto Worneilen Kom	Classic FA	10
3	Thokchom Singh	North Eastern Sporting Union	8
4	Sonjalen Haokip	Pehlum Lamhil Lawm	6
4	Abujam Singh	North Eastern Sporting Union	6

=== Mizoram region ===
Pos	Team	Pld	W	D	L	GF	GA	GD	Pts	Qualification
1	Chawnpui FC	10	6	2	2	34	13	+21	20	Advance to National group stage
2	Chanmari FC	10	6	2	2	33	15	+18	20	Advance to National group stage
3	Ramthar Veng	10	6	1	3	19	15	+4	19	Advance to National group stage
4	SYS FC	10	3	5	2	22	15	+7	14	
5	1st Bn MAP FA	10	1	3	6	8	29	−21	6	
6	Chanmari West	10	1	1	8	14	43	−29	4	

Source: RFYS

==== Top scorers ====
Rank	Player	Club	Goals
1	Suanngaihmuana	Chawnpui FC	10
2	PC Lalruatsanga	Ramthar Veng	9
3	Laltlanzova	Chanmari FC	7
3	Lalthangliana	Chanmari FC	7
5	Ephraim Lalremtluanga	Chawnpui FC	6

=== Mumbai region ===
Pos	Team	Pld	W	D	L	GF	GA	GD	Pts	Qualification
1	RFYC	10	10	0	0	33	3	+30	30	Advance to National group stage
2	Mumbai City	10	6	1	3	19	16	+3	19	Advance to National group stage
3	Iron Born FC	10	4	1	5	14	13	+1	13	
4	India Rush Soccer Club	10	4	0	6	13	16	−3	12	
5	PIFA Sports	10	2	2	6	8	22	−14	8	
6	Kenkre FC	10	1	2	7	11	28	−17	5	

Source: RFYS

==== Top scorers ====
Rank	Player	Club	Goals
1	Vian Vinay Murgod	RFYC	7
2	Ayush Chhikara	Mumbai City	5
3	Dipu Neupane	India Rush SC	4
3	Alex Konthoujam	RFYC	4
3	Mohammed Khatib	Iron Born FC	4

=== North region ===
Pos	Team	Pld	W	D	L	GF	GA	GD	Pts	Qualification
1	Sudeva Delhi	10	6	2	2	19	9	+10	20	Advance to National group stage
2	Garhwal FC	10	5	2	3	17	8	+9	17	Advance to National group stage
3	RoundGlass Punjab	9	3	2	4	10	9	+1	11	
4	Rajasthan United	9	1	2	6	6	26	−20	5	

Source: RFYS

==== Top scorers ====
Rank	Player	Club	Goals
1	Shubho Paul	Sudeva Delhi	5
2	Ashangbam Aphaoba Singh	RoundGlass Punjab	4
3	Sunil Soren	Garhwal FC	2
3	Iashanbok Buhphang	Garhwal FC	2

=== South region ===
Pos	Team	Pld	W	D	L	GF	GA	GD	Pts	Qualification
1	Bengaluru	10	6	3	1	25	9	+16	21	Advance to National group stage
2	Sreenidi Deccan	10	6	1	3	17	10	+7	19	Advance to National group stage
3	Chennaiyin	10	5	3	2	18	6	+12	18	
4	Kickstart FC	10	5	2	3	24	11	+13	17	
5	FC Mangalore	7	3	1	3	9	11	−2	10	
6	Roots FC	7	2	2	3	8	8	0	8	
7	Mohammden Sporting	7	1	0	6	8	35	−27	3	
8	FC Bengaluru United	7	0	0	7	2	21	−19	0	

Source: RFYS

==== Top scorers ====
Rank	Player	Club	Goals
1	Finto	Kickstart FC	8
2	Senthamil S	Chennaiyin	6
2	Satendra Singh Yadav	Bengaluru	6
4	Udit G	Kickstart FC	4
4	Jonathan Ian Franco	Roots FC	4

=== Ranking Of Third-Placed Teams ===
Due to fewer number of teams in North Region, Third placed Team is not taken into account from North Region.

Pos	Grp	Team	Pld	W	D	L	GF	GA	GD	Pts	Qualification
1	Kerala	Kerala Blasters	10	6	2	2	25	12	+13	20	Advance to National group stage
2	Mizoram	Ramthar Veng	10	6	1	3	19	15	+4	19	Advance to National group stage
3	Manipur	North Eastern Sporting Union	10	6	0	4	30	13	+17	18	
4	South	Chennaiyin	10	5	3	2	18	6	+12	18	
5	Assam-Meghalaya	Rangdajied United	10	5	3	2	17	5	+12	18	
6	Goa	Dempo SC	10	4	3	3	16	11	+5	15	
7	Mumbai	Iron Born FC	10	4	1	5	14	13	+1	13	
8	East	Mohammedan	10	3	1	6	11	20	−9	10	

First match(es) will be played: March 2023. Source: RFYS

== National group stage ==
Top 20 teams will qualify from the regional qualifiers to the National group stage. National group stage is divided into 4 groups of 5 teams, with winners advancing to the National Championship stage.

=== Qualification ===
No.	Club	Qualified as
1	Shillong Lajong	Assam-Meghalaya region champions
2	NorthEast United	Assam-Meghalaya region runners-up
3	East Bengal	East region champions
4	Mohun Bagan SG	East region runners-up
5	FC Goa	Goa region champions
6	Velsao S&CC	Goa region runners-up
7	Muthoot FA	Kerala region champions
8	LiFFA	Kerala region runners-up
9	Classic FA	Manipur region champions
10	SAI-RC	Manipur region runners-up
11	Chawnpui FC	Mizoram region champions
12	Chanmari FC	Mizoram region runners-up
13	RFYC	Mumbai region champions
14	Mumbai City	Mumbai region runners-up
15	Sudeva Delhi	North region champions
16	Garhwal FC	North region runners-up
17	Bengaluru	South region champions
18	Sreenidi Deccan	South region runners-up
19	Kerala Blasters	Best 3rd-placed team
20	Ramthar Veng FC	Second-best 3rd-placed team

=== Delhi group ===
All matches to be played at 21 Raj Niwas, Civil Lines, Delhi.

Pos	Team	Pld	W	D	L	GF	GA	GD	Pts	Qualification	SUD	MFA	CHW	GAR	CHA
1	Sudeva Delhi	4	3	1	0	11	4	+7	10	Advance to Next Gen Cup & National championship stage	—	1–0	4–2	2–2	—
2	Muthoot FA	4	2	1	1	7	4	+3	7		—	—	—	—	3–0
3	Chawnpui FC	4	1	1	2	6	7	−1	4		—	1–1	—	2–0	—
4	Garhwal FC	4	1	1	2	6	7	−1	4		—	2–3	—	—	2–0
5	Chanmari FC	4	1	0	3	2	10	−8	3		0–4	—	2–1	—	—

Source: RFYS

=== Imphal group ===
All matches to be played at SAI Complex, Imphal. With the last round being cancelled, Mohun Bagan SG advanced to the National championship stage.

Pos	Team	Pld	W	D	L	GF	GA	GD	Pts	Qualification	AMB	CFA	NEU	SAI	SHL
1	Mohun Bagan SG	3	3	0	0	9	1	+8	9	Advance to Next Gen Cup & National championship stage	—	—	—	3–0	4–0
2	Classic FA	3	1	2	0	7	3	+4	5		—	—	2–2	1–1	—
3	NorthEast United	4	1	2	1	6	6	0	5		1–2	—	—	2–1	—
4	SAI-RC	3	0	1	2	2	6	−4	1		—	—	—	—	—
5	Shillong Lajong	3	0	1	2	1	9	−8	1		—	0–4	1–1	—	—

Source: RFYS

=== Mumbai group ===
All matches to be played at Reliance Corporate Park Football Ground, Ghansoli, Navi Mumbai.

Pos	Team	Pld	W	D	L	GF	GA	GD	Pts	Qualification	RYC	EAB	MCI	RVE	VEL
1	RFYC	4	3	1	0	13	5	+8	10	Advance to Next Gen Cup & National Championship stage	—	—	0–0	—	—
2	East Bengal	4	3	0	1	14	6	+8	9		2–3	—	2–0	—	7–2
3	Mumbai City	4	2	1	1	7	5	+2	7		—	—	—	—	—
4	Ramthar Veng	4	1	0	3	4	7	−3	3		1–2	1–3	0–2	—	2–0
5	Velsao S&CC	4	0	0	4	7	22	−15	0		2–8	—	3–5	—	—

Source: RFYS

=== Bengaluru group ===
All matches to be played at Bangalore Football Stadium, Bengaluru.

Pos	Team	Pld	W	D	L	GF	GA	GD	Pts	Qualification	BEN	GOA	KEB	SDE	LIF
1	Bengaluru	4	3	1	0	9	3	+6	10	Advance to Next Gen Cup & National championship stage	—	—	—	2–0	2–1
2	FC Goa	4	3	0	1	6	4	+2	9		1–4	—	—	3–0	—
3	Kerala Blasters	4	2	1	1	9	5	+4	7		1–1	0–1	—	—	—
4	Sreenidi Deccan	4	1	0	3	7	8	−1	3		—	—	2–3	—	5–0
5	LiFFA	4	0	0	4	2	13	−11	0		—	0–1	1–5	—	—

Source: RFYS

=== Top scorers ===
Rank	Player	Club	Goals
1	Loitongbam Taison Singh	Mohun Bagan SG	5
1	Muhammad Ajsal	Kerala Blasters	5
3	Chirag Bhujel	RFYC	4
3	Himanshu Jangra	East Bengal	4
3	Meuton Fernandes	Velsao S&CC	4
3	Serto Kom	Classic FA	4

== National championship stage ==
Top 4 teams will qualify from the National group stage to the National championship knockout stage, with winners being crowned champions.

=== Qualification ===
No.	Club	Qualified as
1	Sudeva Delhi	Delhi group champions
2	Mohun Bagan SG	Imphal group champions
3	RFYC	Mumbai group champions
4	Bengaluru	Bengaluru group champions

=== Bracket ===
Semifinals
1	Mohun Bagan SG	1 (6)
2	Bengaluru	1 (7)
3	RFYC	0
4	Sudeva Delhi	1

Final
2	Bengaluru	2 (4)
4	Sudeva Delhi	2 (3)
Third place
1	Mohun Bagan SG	5
3	RFYC	1

=== Semi-finals ===
11 May 2023
19.00 IST
SF1

Mohun Bagan SG	1–1	Bengaluru
R. Basfore (yellow card) 5'; Engson (yellow card) 69' (goal) 87'	Report	H. Thoi Singh 61'
Penalties
Suryavanshi (penalty scored); Nassiri (penalty scored); Bhat (penalty scored); Engson (penalty scored); Rana (penalty scored); R. Basfore (penalty scored); T. Tongsin (penalty missed)	6–7	C. Fernandes (penalty scored); Akashdeep (penalty scored); Harpreet (penalty scored); Harmanpreet (penalty scored); H. Thoi Singh (penalty scored); Lyngdoh (penalty scored); Ketkar (penalty scored)

Reliance Corporate Park, Mumbai, Maharashtra
Attendance: 200
Referee: K Ramdasan

11 May 2023
21.00 IST
SF2

RFYC	0–1	Sudeva Delhi
A. Kamath (yellow card) 65'	Report	C. Jackson (yellow card) 51' (yellow-red card) 85'; S. Lotjem 66'; K. Panicker (yellow card) 74'; P. Tushir (yellow card) 90+9'

Reliance Corporate Park, Mumbai, Maharashtra
Attendance: 10
Referee: Mrutyunjay L Amatya

=== Third place ===
14 May 2023
08:00 IST

Mohun Bagan SG	5–1	RFYC
Nassiri 18'; Giri 58'; U. Hansda 68'; D. Biswas 89'; Amandeep 90+2'	Report	S. Mohammed K 26' (yellow card) 65'

Reliance Corporate Park, Mumbai, Maharashtra
Attendance: 10
Referee: Akashkumar Kamleshkumar Mehta

=== Final ===
14 May 2023
19:00 IST

Bengaluru	2–2	Sudeva Delhi
H. Thoi Singh 23' (pen.); S. Singh Yadav 67'	Report	S. Lotjem 17'; D. Gurung 49'
Penalties
C. Fernandes (penalty scored); S. Singh Yadav (penalty scored); Harpreet (penalty scored); Harmanpreet (penalty scored); H. Thoi Singh (penalty missed)	4–3	Paul (penalty scored); S. Lotjem (penalty scored); Bhardwaj (penalty scored); K. Panicker (penalty missed); R. Chhetri (penalty missed)

Reliance Corporate Park, Mumbai, Maharashtra
Attendance: 50
Referee: Surojit Das

== See also ==
- 2022–23 U-17 Youth Cup
