= 2020–21 ATK Mohun Bagan FC season =

Indian football club season

ATK Mohun Bagan
2020–21 season
- Head coach: Antonio López Habas
- Stadium: Fatorda Stadium (for 2020–21 season only) (Note: Due to the COVID-19 pandemic in India, the 2020–21 Indian Super League would be held entirely in Goa, behind closed doors and ATK Mohun Bagan was allotted the Fatorda Stadium as their home ground for the season.)
- Indian Super League: 2nd
- ISL Play-offs: Runners-up
- AFC Cup: (moved to 2021–22 season due to schedule delays)
- Top goalscorer: League: Roy Krishna (14); All: Roy Krishna (14)
- Average home league attendance: 🔒 Closed Doors
- Biggest win: 4–1 vs Odisha
- Biggest defeat: 0–2 vs Mumbai City FC
Home colours	Away colours	Third colours
- All statistics correct as of 18 August 2021.

The 2020–21 ATK Mohun Bagan FC season was the club's 1st season in Indian Super League and 131st season since its establishment in 1889. The club under a merged company competed in ISL, one of the top flights of Indian football, as well as in the AFC Cup (because of delays, the AFC Cup campaign has been moved to 2021–22 season).

== Players ==
First team players
No.	Name	Nat	Pos	Date of birth (Age)	App	Goals
Goalkeepers
12	Avilash Paul	(India)	GK	26 December 1994 (age 31)	0	0
29	Arindam Bhattacharya (Captain) (Note: Coach Habas announced five players will be given the captain's armband in rotation.)	(India)	GK	11 December 1989 (age 36)	41 (Note: Has Previously played for Mohun Bagan (2012-13))	0
Defenders
2	Sumit Rathi	(India)	CB	26 August 2001 (age 24)	6	0
5	Sandesh Jhingan (Captain)	(India)	CB	21 July 1993 (age 32)	22	0
15	Subhasish Bose	(India)	LB	18 August 1995 (age 30)	39 (Note: Has Previously played for Mohun Bagan (2016-17))	0
20	Pritam Kotal (Captain)	(India)	CB	8 September 1993 (age 32)	103 (Note: Has Previously played for Mohun Bagan (2013-17))	4
24	Ranjan Singh Salam	(India)	DF	4 December 1995 (age 30)	1	0
27	Boris Singh Thangjam	(India)	DF	3 January 2000 (age 26)	0	0
33	Prabir Das	(India)	RB	20 December 1993 (age 32)	63 (Note: Has Previously played for Mohun Bagan (2015-17))	1
44	Tiri	(Spain)	CB	14 July 1991 (age 34)	21	0
Midfielders
7	Komal Thatal	(India)	LW/CM	18 September 2000 (age 25)	5	0
8	Carl McHugh	(Republic of Ireland)	CDM	5 February 1993 (age 33)	21	0
10	Edu García (Captain)	(Spain)	AM	24 April 1990 (age 36)	11	1
16	Jayesh Rane	(India)	CM	20 February 1993 (age 33)	16	0
17	Pronay Halder	(India)	CDM	25 February 1993 (age 33)	45 (Note: Has Previously played for Mohun Bagan (2015-17))	0
18	Sheikh Sahil	(India)	CM	28 April 2000 (age 26)	27 (Note: Has Previously played for Mohun Bagan (2019-20))	0
19	Javi Hernández	(Spain)	CM	6 June 1989 (age 36)	17	1
23	Michael Soosairaj	(India)	LW/CM	25 December 1994 (age 31)	1	0
25	Michael Regin	(India)	MF	9 May 1988 (age 38)	3	0
30	Engson Singh	(India)	CM	2 January 2003 (age 23)	1	0
42	Lenny Rodrigues	(India)	CDM	10 May 1987 (age 39)	28 (Note: Has Previously played for Mohun Bagan (2015-16))	0
Forwards
6	Manvir Singh	(India)	RW	6 November 1995 (age 30)	23	6
9	David Williams	(Australia)	ST	26 February 1988 (age 38)	20	6
21	Roy Krishna (Captain)	(Fiji)	ST	30 August 1987 (age 38)	23	14
90	Marcelinho	(Brazil)	FW	22 June 1987 (age 38)	8	2
Left Mid-Season
11	Brad Inman	(Australia)	CM	10 December 1991 (age 34)	7	0
14	Glan Martins	(India)	CDM	1 July 1994 (age 31)	7	0

Source: ATK Mohun Bagan Squad

== Management team ==
Position	Name
Head coach	(Spain) Antonio López Habas
Assistant coach	(Spain) Manuel Cascallana
Goalkeeping coach	(Spain) Ángel Pindado
Head of Youth Development/Assistant Manager	(India) Sanjoy Sen

Last updated: 25 September 2020
Source: themohunbaganac.com

== Competitions ==
=== Overview ===
Competition	Record							
Competition	Pld	W	D	L	GF	GA	GD	Win %
Indian Super League	23	13	5	5	32	19	+13	56.52
Total	23	13	5	5	32	19	+13	56.52

Last updated: 13 March 2021
Source: Competitions

=== Indian Super League ===
==== Regular season ====
===== League table =====
Pos	Team	Pld	W	D	L	GF	GA	GD	Pts	Qualification
1	Mumbai City (L, C)	20	12	4	4	35	18	+17	40	Qualification to ISL playoffs and 2022 AFC Champions League group stage
2	ATK Mohun Bagan (Note: As the Premiers Mumbai City won the ISL playoffs, the regular season runners-up qualified for 2022 AFC Cup play-off round.)	20	12	4	4	28	15	+13	40	Qualification to ISL playoffs and 2022 AFC Cup play-off round
3	NorthEast United	20	8	9	3	31	25	+6	33	Qualification to ISL playoffs
4	Goa	20	7	10	3	31	23	+8	31	Qualification to ISL playoffs
5	Hyderabad	20	6	11	3	27	19	+8	29	
6	Jamshedpur	20	7	6	7	21	22	−1	27	
7	Bengaluru	20	5	7	8	26	28	−2	22	
8	Chennaiyin	20	3	11	6	17	23	−6	20	
9	East Bengal	20	3	8	9	22	33	−11	17	
10	Kerala Blasters	20	3	8	9	23	36	−13	17	
11	Odisha	20	2	6	12	25	44	−19	12	

Source: Indian Super League
Rules for classification: 1) points; 2) head-to-head points; 3) head-to-head goal difference; 4) head-to-head goals scored; 5) goal difference; 6) number of goals scored; 7) fair play ranking; 8) drawing of lots
(C) Champions; (L) League Winners' Shield Winners

===== Results by matchday =====
Matchday	1	2	3	4	5	6	7	8	9	10	11	12	13	14	15	16	17	18	19	20
Ground	A	A	H	A	H	H	H	A	H	H	A	H	A	H	A	A	H	H	A	A
Result	W	W	W	L	D	W	W	D	W	L	D	W	L	W	W	W	W	W	D	L
Position	1	1	1	2	2	2	2	1	1	2	2	2	2	2	2	2	1	1	1	2

Updated to match(es) played on 28 February 2021. Source: Indian Super League
A = Away; H = Home; W = Win; D = Draw; L = Loss

===== Matches =====
20 November 2020 1	Kerala Blasters	0–1	ATK Mohun Bagan	Bambolim
19:30 IST	Samad (yellow card) 78'; Pereyra (yellow card) 89'	Report	Halder (yellow card) 38'; García (yellow card) 43'; Krishna 68'	Stadium: GMC Athletic Stadium; Attendance: 0 (Note: Match was played behind closed doors due to government restrictions regarding the COVID-19 pandemic in India.); Referee: Crystal John; Man of the Match: Roy Krishna (ATK Mohun Bagan)

27 November 2020 2	East Bengal	0–2	ATK Mohun Bagan	Vasco
19:30 IST	Singh (yellow card) 22'; Maghoma (yellow card) 53'; Fox (yellow card) 75'	Report	Rane (yellow card) 45'; Krishna 49'; Kotal (yellow card) 70'; Singh 85'	Stadium: Tilak Maidan Stadium; Attendance: 0 Referee: C. R. Srikrishna; Man of the Match: Carl McHugh (ATK Mohun Bagan)

3 December 2020 3	ATK Mohun Bagan	1–0	Odisha	Margao
19:30 IST	Tiri (yellow card) 8'; Krishna 90+5'	Report	Hendry (yellow card) 50'	Stadium: Fatorda Stadium; Attendance: 0 Referee: L. Ajitkumar Meitei; Man of the Match: Roy Krishna (ATK Mohun Bagan)

7 December 2020 4	Jamshedpur	2–1	ATK Mohun Bagan	Vasco
19:30 IST	Lallawmawma (yellow card) 14'; Valskis 30', 66'; de Lima (yellow card) 45'; Eze (yellow card) 69'; Renthlei (yellow card) 85'	Report	Krishna 80'	Stadium: Tilak Maidan Stadium; Attendance: 0 Referee: C. R. Srikrishna; Man of the Match: Nerijus Valskis (Jamshedpur)

11 December 2020 5	ATK Mohun Bagan	1–1	Hyderabad	Margao
19:30 IST	Rathi (yellow card) 39'; Das (yellow card) 45+3'; Bhattacharya (yellow card) 45+5'; Singh 54'	Report	Chakrabarti (yellow card) 16'; Victor (yellow card) 45+5'; Victor 65' (pen.)	Stadium: Fatorda Stadium; Attendance: 0 Referee: Harish Kundu; Man of the Match: Liston Colaco (Hyderabad)

16 December 2020 6	ATK Mohun Bagan	1–0	Goa	Margao
19:30 IST	Tiri (yellow card) 15'; Williams (yellow card) 23'; Krishna 85' (pen.); Kotal (yellow card) 88'	Report		Stadium: Fatorda Stadium; Attendance: 0 Referee: Rahul Kumar Gupta; Man of the Match: Carl McHugh (ATK Mohun Bagan)

21 December 2020 7	ATK Mohun Bagan	1–0	Bengaluru	Margao
19:30 IST	Williams 33'	Report	Juanan (yellow card) 5'; Bheke (yellow card) 43'	Stadium: Fatorda Stadium; Attendance: 0 Referee: C. R. Srikrishna; Man of the Match: David Williams (ATK Mohun Bagan)

29 December 2020 8	Chennaiyin	0–0	ATK Mohun Bagan	Bambolim
19:30 IST	Lalrinzuala (yellow card) 80'	Report	Halder (yellow card) 63'	Stadium: GMC Athletic Stadium; Attendance: 0 Referee: A Rowan; Man of the Match: Arindam Bhattacharya (ATK Mohun Bagan)

3 January 2021 9	ATK Mohun Bagan	2–0	NorthEast United	Margao
19:30 IST	Williams (yellow card) 25'; Bose (yellow card) 39'; McHugh (yellow card) 45+2'; Krishna 51'; Lambot 57' (o.g.); Das (yellow card) 58'; Halder (yellow card) 68'	Report	Gallego (yellow card) 62'	Stadium: Fatorda Stadium; Attendance: 0 Referee: Tejas Nagvenkar; Man of the Match: Roy Krishna (ATK Mohun Bagan)

11 January 2021 10	ATK Mohun Bagan	0–1	Mumbai City	Margao
19:30 IST	Halder (yellow card) 47'; Hernándes (yellow card) 62'; Bose (yellow card) 90+4'	Report	Mandar (yellow card) 49'; Ogbeche 69'; Hernán (yellow card) 90+4'	Stadium: Fatorda Stadium; Attendance: 0 Referee: C. R. Srikrishna; Man of the Match: Bartholomew Ogbeche (Mumbai City)

17 January 2021 11	Goa	1–1	ATK Mohun Bagan	Margao
19:30 IST	González (yellow card) 62'; Donachie (yellow card) 74'; Pandita 84'	Report	McHugh (yellow card) 61'; García 75'	Stadium: Fatorda Stadium; Attendance: 0 Referee: L. Ajit Metei; Man of the Match: Saviour Gama (Goa)

21 January 2021 12	ATK Mohun Bagan	1–0	Chennaiyin	Margao
19:30 IST	McHugh (yellow card) 45+1'; Rathi (yellow card) 63'; Tiri (yellow card) 88'; Williams 90+1'	Report	Singh (yellow card) 82'	Stadium: Fatorda Stadium; Attendance: 0 Referee: A Rowan; Man of the Match: David Williams (ATK Mohun Bagan)

26 January 2021 13	NorthEast United	2–1	ATK Mohun Bagan	Margao
19:30 IST	Kumar (yellow card) 49'; Machado 60'; Gallego 81'; Tamang (yellow card) 90+6'	Report	Krishna 72'; Halder (yellow card) 74'; Rane (yellow card) 90+1'	Stadium: Fatorda Stadium; Attendance: 0 Referee: Crystal John; Man of the Match: Federico Gallego (NorthEast United)

31 January 2021 14	ATK Mohun Bagan	3–2	Kerala Blasters	Margao
19:30 IST	Marcelinho 59'; Krishna 65' (pen.), 87'; McHugh (yellow card) 74'; Krishna (yellow card) 87'; Halder (yellow card) 90'; Kotal (yellow card) 90'	Report	Hooper 14'; Nhamoinesu 51'; Nhamoinesu (yellow card) 75'; Hooper (yellow card) 90'; Praveen (yellow card) 90'; Samad (yellow card) 90+4'	Stadium: Fatorda Stadium; Attendance: 0 Referee: L. Ajitkumar Meitei; Man of the Match: Roy Krishna (ATK Mohun Bagan)

6 February 2021 15	Odisha	1–4	ATK Mohun Bagan	Bambolim
19:30 IST	Tratt (yellow card) 2'; Bora (yellow card) 41'; Alexander 45+1'; Onwu (yellow card) 58'; Alexander (yellow card) 85'	Report	Singh 11', 54'; Halder (yellow card) 64'; Bose (yellow card) 80'; Krishna 83' (pen.), 86'; Kotal (yellow card) 90'	Stadium: GMC Athletic Stadium; Attendance: 0 Referee: Tejas Nagvenkar; Man of the Match: Manvir Singh (ATK Mohun Bagan)

9 February 2021 16	Bengaluru	0–2	ATK Mohun Bagan	Margao
19:30 IST	Chaudhari (yellow card) 36'; Khabra (yellow card) 44'; Chhetri (yellow card) 90+2'	Report	Krishna 44' (pen.); Marcelinho 37'	Stadium: Fatorda Stadium; Attendance: 0 Referee: A Rowan; Man of the Match: Marcelinho Leite Pereira (ATK Mohun Bagan)

14 February 2021 17	ATK Mohun Bagan	1–0	Jamshedpur	Margao
19:30 IST	McHugh (yellow card) 51'; Krishna 85'	Report	de Lima (yellow card) 87'	Stadium: Fatorda Stadium; Attendance: 0 Referee: Harish Kundu; Man of the Match: Roy Krishna (ATK Mohun Bagan)

19 February 2021 18	ATK Mohun Bagan	3–1	East Bengal	Margao
19:30 IST	Krishna 15'; McHugh (yellow card) 31'; Jhingan (yellow card) 64'; Williams 72'; Williams (yellow card) 88'; Hernández 89'	Report	Enobakhare (yellow card) 18'; Tiri 41' (o.g.); Pilkington (yellow card) 62'; Maghoma (yellow card) 68'; Mukherjee (yellow card) 90+3'; Fox (yellow card) 90+4'	Stadium: Fatorda Stadium; Attendance: 0 Referee: Tejas Nagvenkar; Man of the Match: Roy Krishna (ATK Mohun Bagan)

22 February 2021 19	Hyderabad	2–2	ATK Mohun Bagan	Vasco
19:30 IST	Konsham (red card) 5'; Aridane 8'; Chianese (yellow card) 45+1'; Aridane (yellow card) 70'; Alberg 74'; Kattimani (yellow card) 86'	Report	Singh (yellow card) 14'; Jhingan (yellow card) 54'; Singh 57'; Bose (yellow card) 62'; Thatal (yellow card) 82'; Kotal 90+3'	Stadium: Tilak Maidan Stadium; Attendance: 0 Referee: L. Ajitkumar Meitei; Man of the Match: Aridane Santana (Hyderabad)

28 February 2021 20	Mumbai City	2–0	ATK Mohun Bagan	Bambolim
19:30 IST	Fall 7'; Fernandes (yellow card) 14'; Ranawade (yellow card) 26'; Ogbeche 39'; Santana (yellow card) 74'; Pratap (yellow card) 79'	Report	Kotal (yellow card) 37'; Halder (yellow card) 77'	Stadium: GMC Athletic Stadium; Attendance: 0 Referee: Tejas Nagvenkar; Man of the Match: Mourtada Fall (Mumbai City)

==== ISL play-offs ====
6 March 2021 Semi-finals 1st leg	NorthEast United	1–1	ATK Mohun Bagan	Bambolim
19:30 IST	Sylla 90+4'	Report	Williams 34'	Stadium: GMC Stadium; Attendance: 0 Referee: Crystal John

9 March 2021 Semi-finals 2nd leg	ATK Mohun Bagan	2–1 (3–2 agg.)	NorthEast United	Margao
19:30 IST	Williams 38'; Singh 68'	Report	Suhair 74'	Stadium: Fatorda Stadium; Attendance: 0 Referee: Rahul Kumar Gupta

13 March 2021 Final	Mumbai City	2–1	ATK Mohun Bagan	Margao
19:30 IST	Tiri 29' (o.g.); Singh 90'	Report	Williams 18'	Stadium: Fatorda Stadium; Attendance: 0 Referee: Tejas Nagavenkar

== Statistics ==
As of 13 March 2021

=== Appearances ===
Players with no appearances are not included in the list.

Appearances for Mohun Bagan in 2020–21 season
No.	Pos.	Nat.	Name	Indian Super League		ISL Playoffs		Total	
No.	Pos.	Nat.	Name	Apps	Starts	Apps	Starts	Apps	Starts
Goalkeepers
29	GK	(India)	Arindam Bhattacharya	20	20	3	3	23	23
Defenders
2	CB	(India)	Sumit Rathi	6	3	0	0	6	3
5	CB	(India)	Sandesh Jhingan	20	20	2	2	22	22
15	LB	(India)	Subhasish Bose	17	15	3	3	20	18
20	CB	(India)	Pritam Kotal	19	19	3	3	22	22
24	DF	(India)	Ranjan Singh Salam	1	0	0	0	1	0
33	RB	(India)	Prabir Das	18	10	2	1	20	11
44	CB	(India)	Tiri	19	19	2	2	21	21
Midfielders
7	LW/CM	(India)	Komal Thatal	5	0	0	0	5	0
8	CDM	(Republic of Ireland)	Carl McHugh	18	18	3	3	21	21
10	AM	(Spain)	Edu García	11	9	0	0	11	9
12	AM	(Australia)	Brad Inman	7	2	0	0	7	2
14	CDM	(India)	Glan Martins	7	3	0	0	7	3
16	CM	(India)	Jayesh Rane	14	4	2	0	16	4
17	CDM	(India)	Pronoy Halder	15	7	1	0	16	7
18	CM	(India)	Sheikh Sahil	7	4	0	0	7	4
19	CM	(India)	Javi Hernández	14	8	3	3	17	11
23	LW/CM	(India)	Michael Soosairaj	1	1	0	0	1	1
25	CDM	(India)	Michael Regin	3	0	0	0	3	0
30	CM	(India)	Engson Singh	1	0	0	0	1	0
42	CDM	(India)	Lenny Rodrigues	6	6	3	3	9	9
Forwards
6	RW	(India)	Manvir Singh	20	13	3	3	23	16
9	ST	(Australia)	David Williams	17	13	3	3	20	16
21	ST	(Fiji)	Roy Krishna	20	20	3	3	23	23
90	FW	(Brazil)	Marcelinho Leite Pereira	6	6	2	1	8	7

=== Goal scorers ===
Rank	No.	Pos.	Name	Indian Super League	ISL Playoffs	Total
1	21	FW	(Fiji) Roy Krishna	14	0	8
2	6	FW	(India) Manvir Singh	5	1	6
2	9	FW	(Australia) David Williams	3	3	6
4	90	FW	(Brazil) Marcelinho Pereira	2	0	2
5	10	MF	(Spain) Edu García	1	0	1
5	19	MF	(Spain) Javi Hernández	1	0	1
5	20	DF	(India) Pritam Kotal	1	0	1
Own goals				1	0	1
Total				28	4	32

Last updated: 13 March 2021.
Source: Fbref

=== Assists ===
Rank	No.	Pos.	Name	Indian Super League	ISL Playoffs	Total
1	21	FW	(Fiji) Roy Krishna	4	4	8
2	6	FW	(India) Manvir Singh	2	0	2
2	8	MF	(Republic of Ireland) Carl McHugh	2	0	2
2	9	FW	(Australia) David Williams	2	0	2
2	11	MF	(Australia) Brad Inman	2	0	2
2	44	DF	(Spain) Tiri	2	0	2
3	14	MF	(India) Glan Martins	1	0	1
3	17	MF	(India) Pronay Halder	1	0	1
3	19	MF	(Spain) Javi Hernández	1	0	1
3	33	DF	(India) Prabir Das	1	0	1

=== Clean sheets ===
Rank	No.	Pos.	Name	Indian Super League	ISL Playoffs	Total
1	29	GK	(India) Arindam Bhattacharya	10	0	10
Total				10	0	10

Last updated: 13 March 2021.
Source: FBref

== See also ==
- 2020–21 in Indian football
