= Carl McHugh =

Irish footballer (born 1993)

Personal information
- Full name: Carl Gerard McHugh
- Date of birth: 5 February 1993 (age 33)
- Place of birth: Lettermacaward, Ireland
- Height: 1.82 m (6 ft 0 in)
- Positions: Defensive midfielder; centre-back; left-back

Team information
- Current team: Sligo Rovers
- Number: 16

Youth career
- –2009: Dungloe Town
- 2009–2011: Reading

Senior career*
Years	Team	Apps	(Gls)
2011–2012	Reading	0	(0)
2011	→ Swindon Supermarine (loan)	7	(2)
2011	→ Dundalk (loan)	12	(0)
2012–2014	Bradford City	30	(2)
2014–2016	Plymouth Argyle	81	(5)
2016–2019	Motherwell	82	(3)
2019–2020	ATK	6	(1)
2020–2023	Mohun Bagan	51	(3)
2023–2025	Goa	41	(2)
2026–	Sligo Rovers	28	(1)

International career^{‡}
2009–2010	Republic of Ireland U17	7	(0)
2010–2011	Republic of Ireland U19	5	(0)
2013	Republic of Ireland U21	2	(0)
- * Club domestic league appearances and goals as of 11:30, 10 November 2026 (UTC) ‡ National team caps and goals as of 13:49, 27 March 2013 (UTC)

Carl Gerard McHugh (born 5 February 1993) is an Irish professional footballer who plays as a defensive midfielder for League of Ireland Premier Division club Sligo Rovers. He can also play as a centre-back or left-back.

== Club career ==
=== Early career ===
Born in Lettermacaward, County Donegal, McHugh left Donegal club Dungloe Town to sign a scholarship with English club Reading at the age of 16. He spent loan spells at Swindon Supermarine and Dundalk. He spent one year as a professional at Reading before being released in the summer of 2012.

=== Bradford City ===
McHugh signed for Bradford City in August 2012. He made his professional debut for Bradford City on 28 August 2012, in a League Cup match against Watford. He made his debut in The Football League on 27 October 2012, coming on as a substitute in the 1–0 defeat away at Burton Albion.

In November, he starred and scored an equalising header for Bradford City in their FA Cup victory over Northampton Town. Earlier that month, McHugh had been praised by his manager for his performance against Wigan Athletic in the League Cup, and he later commented that his recent spell of first-team games had been a "huge learning curve" for him. McHugh's performances were praised by teammate Rory McArdle.

Following Bradford City's elimination of Aston Villa in the League Cup semi-final, McHugh was photographed waving the flag of his native county on the pitch at Villa Park. He later said, "That was the highlight of the night for me. Back in Bradford they might have thought it was the Irish flag, but they know now that it is the Donegal flag." In the run-up to the 2013 Football League Cup Final, which McHugh played in, he was cited as an "unsung hero" of the Bradford City team. In the latter stages of the 2012–13 season, he began to be played more as a left-back. In June 2013, McHugh was praised by former Bradford City left-back Wayne Jacobs. In July 2013, McHugh signed a new one-year contract with Bradford City, and later that month he spoke about his fight to become a first-team member in the forthcoming season.

In November 2013, McHugh publicly spoke about his lack of first-team football. By 17 January 2014, however, he had played three of the club's last four games, and he credited a sports psychologist for helping him regain his first-team spot.

=== Plymouth Argyle ===
On 16 June 2014, McHugh signed a two-year contract with Plymouth Argyle. He played 50 games for Plymouth in his first season at the club, mainly at centre-back alongside Peter Hartley and Curtis Nelson. During the 2014–15 season Plymouth had one of the best defensive records in the league.

Following the arrival of new Plymouth manager Derek Adams in the summer of 2015, McHugh was moved further up the field into a midfield role. He played all season in midfield, earning a lot of praise for his performances throughout the season.

=== Motherwell ===
On 5 July 2016, McHugh signed a two-year contract with Motherwell. His signing was met with much controversy, signing for Motherwell despite previously agreeing terms to extend his contract with previous club Plymouth Argyle in writing. McHugh suffered a serious head injury – a two inch deep gash above his right eye – on the opening day of the season against Kilmarnock on 6 August 2016. Motherwell manager Mark McGhee later said that the nature of the injury meant the club could not put a timescale on McHugh's return. He made his comeback on 28 December 2016, away to Inverness Caledonian Thistle. On 4 February 2017, McHugh was sent off during a Scottish Premiership match with Hearts following a challenge on Don Cowie. Motherwell went on to lose the game 3–0, with Mark McGhee blaming the McHugh red card for losing the game. On 4 March 2017, he scored his first Motherwell goal in a 2–1 win away to Kilmarnock. In June 2017 it was announced that McHugh would be Motherwell's new captain, before signing a new two-year contract with the club on 27 July 2017. Ahead of the 2018–19 season McHugh gave up his role as captain, saying it was best for both himself and the club.

=== ATK ===
In May 2019 McHugh signed for Indian club ATK. He scored on his debut. He said he chose to play in India because of its improving standards. McHugh's debut season with ATK ended early for him due to injury, although the club secured the ISL championship title.

=== Mohun Bagan ===
He joined ATK Mohun Bagan after ATK merged with Mohun Bagan in 2020. With the club, he began 2022–23 season on 20 August 2022 against Rajasthan United at the 131st edition of Durand Cup as his team lost the match 3–2.

=== Goa ===
On 28 July 2023, McHugh signed for Goa after he mutually parted ways with Mohun Bagan. In September 2025 he was rumoured to be joining Chennaiyin.

=== Sligo Rovers ===
On 17 November 2025, it was announced that McHugh would sign for League of Ireland Premier Division club Sligo Rovers on a two-year-contract, from the 2026 season. McHugh scored 2 goals in 31 appearances in all competitions during his first season with the club as they finished bottom of the league and were relegated to play in the League of Ireland First Division for the first time since 2006.

== International career ==
Having previously played for them at under-17 and under-19 levels, McHugh was called up to the Republic of Ireland under-21 squad in January 2013. He made his debut for the under-21 on 6 February 2013, appearing as a second-half substitute in a 3–0 victory over the Netherlands. McHugh was recalled to the Irish under-21 squad in March 2013, and he earned a second cap for the under-21s on 25 March 2013. He was re-called to the under-21 squad in October 2013 for two Euro Championship qualifiers.

== Personal life ==
McHugh played Gaelic football for Na Rossa, where he was coached by All-Ireland winner Declan Bonner. He is a close friend of Donegal Gaelic footballer Patrick McBrearty. McHugh's footballing hero is Shay Given, who also comes from Donegal.

== Career statistics ==
As of match played on 9 October 2026

Appearances and goals by club, season and competition
Club	Season	League			National Cup (Note: Includes FA Cup, FAI Cup, Scottish Cup & Super Cup)		League Cup (Note: Includes EFL Cup, League of Ireland Cup, Scottish League Cup & Durand Cup)		Other		Total	
Club	Season	Division	Apps	Goals	Apps	Goals	Apps	Goals	Apps	Goals	Apps	Goals
Reading	2010–11	EFL Championship	0	0	0	0	0	0	0	0	0	0
Reading	2011–12	EFL Championship	0	0	0	0	0	0	–		0	0
Reading	Total		0	0	0	0	0	0	0	0	0	0
Swindon Supermarine (loan)	2010–11	Southern League Premier Division	7	2	0	0	—		0	0	7	2
Dundalk (loan)	2011	League of Ireland Premier Division	12	0	4	0	0	0	0	0	16	0
Bradford City	2012–13	League Two	16	1	3	1	6	1	3 (Note: Appearances in Football League Trophy)	0	28	3
Bradford City	2013–14	League One	14	1	0	0	1	0	1	0	16	1
Bradford City	Total		30	2	3	1	7	1	4	0	44	4
Plymouth Argyle	2014–15	League Two	44	2	1	0	1	1	4 (Note: Two appearances in the Football League Trophy and two in League Two play-offs)	0	50	3
Plymouth Argyle	2015–16	League Two	37	3	1	0	1	0	5 (Note: Two appearances and one goal in Football League Trophy; three appearances in League Two play-offs)	1	44	4
Plymouth Argyle	Total		81	5	2	0	2	1	9	1	94	7
Motherwell	2016–17	Scottish Premiership	19	2	1	0	2	0	—		22	2
Motherwell	2017–18	Scottish Premiership	35	0	4	1	8	0	—		47	1
Motherwell	2018–19	Scottish Premiership	28	1	1	0	6	0	—		34	1
Motherwell	Total		82	3	6	1	16	0	0	0	104	4
ATK	2019–20	Indian Super League	6	1	—		—		0	0	6	1
Mohun Bagan	2020–21	Indian Super League	18	0	—		—		7 (Note: Four appearances in AFC Cup; Three appearances in Indian Super League playoffs)	0	25	0
Mohun Bagan	2021–22	Indian Super League	16	0	—		—		5 (Note: Three appearances, one goal in AFC Cup; Two appearances in Indian Super League playoffs)	1	21	1
Mohun Bagan	2022–23	Indian Super League	17	3	3	0	3	0	4 (Note: Appearances in Indian Super League playoffs)	0	27	3
Mohun Bagan	Total		51	3	3	0	3	0	16	1	73	4
Goa	2023–24	Indian Super League	21	1	3	0	2	1	3	0	29	2
Goa	2024–25	Indian Super League	20	1	4	0	0	0	2	0	26	1
Goa	Total		41	2	7	0	2	1	5	0	55	3
Sligo Rovers	2026	League of Ireland Premier Division	28	1	3	1	—		—		31	2
Career total			338	19	28	3	30	3	34	2	430	27

== Honours ==
Bradford City

- Football League Two play-offs: 2013
- Football League Cup runner-up: 2012–13

ATK

- Indian Super League: 2019–20

Mohun Bagan

- ISL Cup: 2022–23
- Indian Super League runner-up: 2020–21
