= Kiyan Nassiri =

Indian footballer (born 2000)

Personal information
- Full name: Kiyan Nassiri Giri
- Date of birth: 17 November 2000 (age 25)
- Place of birth: Kolkata, West Bengal, India
- Height: 1.80 m (5 ft 11 in)
- Position: Winger

Team information
- Current team: Mohun Bagan

Youth career
- 2016–2017: CC&FC
- 2017–2018: Mohammedan
- 2018–2019: Mohun Bagan

Senior career*
| Years | Team | Apps | (Gls) |
| 2019–2024 | Mohun Bagan | 46 | (4) |
| 2024–2025 | Chennaiyin | 15 | (0) |
| 2025– | Mohun Bagan | 4 | (0) |
- * Club domestic league appearances and goals as of 14:20, 28 June 2025 (UTC)

Kiyan Nassiri Giri (born 17 November 2000) is an Indian professional footballer who plays as a forward for Indian Super League club Mohun Bagan SG.

== Personal life ==
Kiyan is the son of former Iran national youth team player and East Bengal legend Jamshid Nassiri. His mother Suzanne Giri hails from Shillong. He grew up in Queens Mansion at Park Street. He was a student of St. James' School, where he led the school team to victory in the Debanjan Cup Interschool Tournament in 2015.

== Career ==
=== Early career ===
Kiyan is the son of East Bengal legend Jamshid Nassiri. He was always passionate about football and during his school days he was called up for the Bengal U14 camp in Kalyani in 2014. During the U14 camp in Kalyani, in which he made 5 appearances and scored 6 goals. He went on to play for the Mohammedan Sporting U16 I-league squad. During the 2017–18 season, he joined Calcutta Football Club, and was the highest scorer in the league helping the team to promotion that season.

=== Mohun Bagan ===
In 2019, he joined Mohun Bagan to play for their U-19 side in the Zee Bangla Football League and was sent on trial for the senior team. Kibu Vicuna was impressed by his performance at 2019–20 pre-season trial in Goa and promoted him to the senior team. He made his professional debut on 1 March 2020, by coming as a seventy ninth-minute substitute against TRAU in a 3–1 win.

=== Mohun Bagan SG ===
Following the merger of ATK and Mohun Bagan in 2020 to become Mohun Bagan, he signed a long-term contract with the club and was included in senior squad for the 2021–22 Indian Super League season. Ahead of the team's inter-zonal semifinal match against Uzbek side FC Nasaf in the 2021 AFC Cup, Kiyan was called up in twenty-two member squad. He debuted for the side against Nasaf.

He scored a hat-trick for Mohun Bagan in their 3–1 derby win against East Bengal on 29 January 2022, and became the youngest ever player in the Indian Super League to do so. As 2022–23 season began, Nassiri appeared with the club on 20 August against Rajasthan United at the 131st edition of Durand Cup, in which he scored the opener but lost the match by 3–2.

=== Chennaiyin ===
On 14 June 2024, Nassiri signed a three-year contract with Chennaiyin. Nassiri appeared in 15 league matches, starting six times and registered one assist during the season. Despite seeking more game time, he did not score during his stint with the club.

=== Mohun Bagan SG ===
On 4 July 2025, Nassiri departed Chennaiyin after one year at the club and rejoined Mohun Bagan SG, on a three-year contract.

== International ==
=== India ===
On 21 August 2024, Nassiri received his first call-up to the senior Indian national team, being named in the 26-man provisional squad for the 2024 Intercontinental Cup under head coach Manolo Márquez. However, he did not make an on-field appearance during the competition.

== Career statistics ==
=== Club ===
As of 5 November 2026

| Club | Season | League | | | Durand Cup | | Super Cup | | AFC | | Other | | Total | |
| Club | Season | Division | Apps | Goals | Apps | Goals | Apps | Goals | Apps | Goals | Apps | Goals | Apps | Goals |
|---|---|---|---|---|---|---|---|---|---|---|---|---|---|---|
| Mohun Bagan | 2019–20 | I-League | 1 | 0 | 0 | 0 | — | | — | | 1 (Note: Appearances in Calcutta Football League) | — | 2 | 0 |
| Mohun Bagan | 2020–21 | Indian Super League | 0 | 0 | — | | — | | — | | — | | 0 | 0 |
| Mohun Bagan | 2021–22 | Indian Super League | 13 | 3 | — | | — | | 4 (Note: 1 in AFC Cup 2021, 2 in AFC Cup 2022 Qualifiers, 1 in AFC Cup 2022 Group Stage) | 0 | — | | 17 | 3 |
| Mohun Bagan | 2022–23 | Indian Super League | 16 | 0 | 4 | 2 | 3 | 1 | 1 (Note: AFC Cup 2022, Inter-Zonal SF) | 0 | 1 (Note: Appearance in playoff for the AFC Cup qualifying play-off) | 0 | 25 | 3 |
| Mohun Bagan | 2023–24 | Indian Super League | 16 | 1 | 3 | 1 | 3 | 0 | 5 (Note: AFC Cup 2023-24) | 1 | 7 | 2 | 34 | 5 |
| Mohun Bagan | 2025–26 | Indian Super League | 4 | 0 | 2 | 0 | — | | 1 | 0 | 3 (Note: 2 Appearance(s) and 0 Goals in IFA Shield and 1 Appearance and 1 Goal in 2025 CFL Premier Division) | 1 | 10 | 1 |
| Mohun Bagan | 2026–27 | Indian Super League | — | | 6 | 0 | — | | — | | 13 (Note: 11 Appearances and 5 Goals in 2026 Calcutta League and 2 Appearances in 2026 IFA Shield) | 5 | 19 | 5 |
| Mohun Bagan | Total | | 50 | 4 | 15 | 3 | 6 | 1 | 11 | 1 | 25 | 8 | 107 | 17 |
| Chennaiyin | 2024–25 | Indian Super League | 15 | 0 | — | | 0 | 0 | — | | — | | 15 | 0 |
| Career total | | | 65 | 4 | 15 | 3 | 6 | 1 | 11 | 1 | 25 | 8 | 122 | 17 |

== Honours ==
Mohun Bagan

- I-League: 2019–20
- Indian Super League Cup: 2022–23
- Durand Cup: 2023
- Indian Super League Shield: 2023–24
- IFA Shield: 2025, 2026
- Calcutta Football League: 2026

Individual

- Mohun Bagan Best Forward Award: 2022
