= Sumit Rathi =

Indian footballer (born 2001)

Personal information
- Date of birth: 26 August 2001 (age 25)
- Place of birth: Muzaffarnagar, Uttar Pradesh
- Height: 1.76 m (5 ft 9 in)
- Position: Centre-back

Youth career
- AIFF Elite Academy

Senior career*
Years	Team	Apps	(Gls)
2017–2018	Indian Arrows	0	(0)
2018–2019	ATK B	10	(0)
2019–2020	ATK	14	(0)
2020–2025	Mohun Bagan SG	12	(0)
2025	NorthEast United	1	(0)
2025	Thrissur Magic	0	(0)

International career^{‡}
2019–2021	India U20	8	(1)
2021–2023	India U23	3	(0)
- * Club domestic league appearances and goals as of 8 March 2025 ‡ National team caps and goals as of 19 September 2023

Sumit Rathi (born 26 August 2001) is an Indian professional footballer who plays as a defender.

== Career ==
=== Early career ===
He started his career at AIFF Elite Academy, later joining Indian Arrows who play in the I-League for the 2017–18 season.

==== ATK ====
He was signed by ATK Reserves team for 2018–19 season, where he turned out for 10 matches in the season.

For the 2019–20 season, Rathi was called up to the senior team by manager Antonio Lopez Habas. He was declared 'Hero of the Match' in the match against Mumbai City in the 11th round of the season. After making 14 appearances in his breakthrough season and impressing throughout, as well as helping ATK to their 3rd ISL trophy, he was declared the Emerging Player of the Season for 2019–20.

=== 2020–2021 season ===
On 14 August Sumit Rathi signed a five-year contract for Mohun Bagan SG keeping him till 2025.

== Career statistics ==
=== Club ===
As of 12 December 2022

Club	Season	League			Cup		AFC		Total	
Club	Season	Division	Apps	Goals	Apps	Goals	Apps	Goals	Apps	Goals
Indian Arrows	2017–18	I-League	0	0	0	0	–		0	0
ATK B	2018–19	I-League 2nd Division	10	0	0	0	–		10	0
ATK	2019–20	Indian Super League	14	0	0	0	–		14	0
Mohun Bagan SG	2020–21	Indian Super League	6	0	0	0	–		6	0
Mohun Bagan SG	2021–22	Indian Super League	1	0	0	0	3 (Note: Appearance(s) in AFC Cup)	0	4	0
Mohun Bagan SG	2022–23	Indian Super League	0	0	2 (Note: Appearance(s) in Durand Cup)	0	1	0	3	0
Career total			31	0	2	0	4	0	37	0

== Honours ==
ATK

- Indian Super League: 2019–20

Mohan Bagan

- Indian Super League: 2022–23

India U19

- OFC Youth Development Tournament: 2019

Individual

- ISL Emerging Player of the League: 2019–20
