= Glan Martins =

Indian footballer (born 1994)

Personal information
- Full name: Glan Peter Martins
- Date of birth: 1 July 1994 (age 32)
- Place of birth: Velsao, Goa
- Height: 1.80 m (5 ft 11 in)
- Position: Defensive midfielder

Team information
- Current team: Chennaiyin

Youth career
- SESA FA
- 2014–2015: Sporting Goa

Senior career*
Years	Team	Apps	(Gls)
2015–2019	Sporting Goa	13	(0)
2019–2020	Churchill Brothers	14	(0)
2020–2021	ATK Mohun Bagan	7	(0)
2021–2024	Goa	28	(1)
2023–2024	→ Mohun Bagan SG (loan)	16	(0)
2024–2026	Mohun Bagan SG	0	(0)
2026–	Chennaiyin	1	(0)

International career^{‡}
2021–2022	India	13	(0)
Medal record
Representing India
SAFF Championship
Winner	2021 Maldives
- * Club domestic league appearances and goals as of 10 October 2026 ‡ National team caps and goals as of 14:02, 14 June 2022 (UTC)

Glan Peter Martins (born 1 July 1994) is an Indian professional footballer who plays as a midfielder for Indian Super League club Chennaiyin.

== Club career ==
Martins started his career at the SESA Football Academy. In 2014, Martins went to the United States to participate in the USL Pro combine with Combine Rush Soccer Academy where he failed to grab the eye of scouts. He then signed for Sporting Clube de Goa for their Goa Professional League campaign where he played in four matches. Then, on 18 March 2015, it was announced that Martins would be added to Sporting Goa's squad for the remainder of the I-League season as the club were fighting for survival.

He made his professional debut for the club on 2 May 2015 against Bharat. Martins came on as an 88th-minute substitute for Brandon Fernandes as Sporting Goa won 2–0.

== International career ==
He made his international debut for India on 3 June 2021 in the 2022 world cup qualifier against Qatar. He played for 68 minutes in his debut match.

== Career statistics ==
=== Club ===
As of 27 July 2024

Club	Season	League			Cup		AFC		Total	
Club	Season	Division	Apps	Goals	Apps	Goals	Apps	Goals	Apps	Goals
Sporting Goa	2014–15	I-League	3	0	0	0	–		3	0
Sporting Goa	2015–16	I-League	10	0	0	0	–		10	0
Sporting Goa	Total		13	0	0	0	0	0	13	0
Churchill Brothers	2019–20	I-League	14	0	0	0	–		14	0
ATK Mohun Bagan	2020–21	Indian Super League	7	0	0	0	–		7	0
Goa	2020–21	Indian Super League	8	1	0	0	6 (Note: Appearance(s) in AFC Champions League)	0	14	1
Goa	2021–22	Indian Super League	11	0	4 (Note: Appearance(s) in Durand Cup)	0	–		15	0
Goa	2022–23	Indian Super League	9	0	0	0	–		9	0
Goa	Total		28	1	4	0	6	0	38	1
Mohun Bagan SG (loan)	2022–23	Indian Super League	8	0	2 (Note: Appearance(s) in Super Cup)	0	1 (Note: Appearance in play-offs for AFC Cup qualifying play-off)	0	11	0
Mohun Bagan SG (loan)	2023–24	Indian Super League	8	0	6	0	7 (Note: Appearance(s) in AFC Cup)	0	21	0
Mohun Bagan SG	2024–25	Indian Super League	0	0	1	0	–		1	0
Career total			78	1	13	0	14	0	105	1

=== International ===
As of 14 June 2022

National Team	Year	Apps	Goals
India	2021	9	0
India	2022	4	0
Total		13	0

== Honours ==
Mohun Bagan

- Durand Cup: 2023
- Indian Super League: Winner 2022–23

=== International ===
India

- SAFF Championship: 2021
