= Pronay Halder =

Indian footballer (born 1993)

Personal information
- Date of birth: 25 February 1993 (age 33)
- Place of birth: Barrackpore, West Bengal, India
- Height: 1.80 m (5 ft 11 in)
- Position: Defensive midfielder

Team information
- Current team: Jamshedpur
- Number: 14

Youth career
- 2007–2010: Tata Football Academy

Senior career*
Years	Team	Apps	(Gls)
2011–2013	Pailan Arrows	24	(1)
2013–2016	Dempo	20	(0)
2015	→ Goa (loan)	8	(0)
2016–2017	Mohun Bagan	20	(0)
2016	→ Mumbai City (loan)	5	(0)
2017–2018	Goa	13	(0)
2018–2020	ATK	22	(1)
2020–2023	Mohun Bagan SG	18	(0)
2021–2022	→ Jamshedpur (loan)	14	(1)
2023–	Jamshedpur	20	(0)

International career^{‡}
2011–2012	India U19	4	(1)
2012–2016	India U23	5	(0)
2015–2022	India	23	(1)
- * Club domestic league appearances and goals as of 19:30, 7 April 2025 (UTC) ‡ National team caps and goals as of 17:29, 8 June 2022 (UTC)

Pronay Halder (Bengali: প্রণয় হালদার; born 25 February 1993) is an Indian footballer who plays as a defensive midfielder for Indian Super League club Jamshedpur.

== Club career ==
Born in Barrackpore, West Bengal, Halder started his youth career with Tata Football Academy in 2007 and got graduated in 2010.

=== Pailan Arrows ===
Halder signed for Pailan Arrows in the I-League for the 2011-12 season in the summer of 2011. He then played in Pailan's second victory of the season in a Round 23 match against HAL.

=== Dempo ===
On 26 October 2013, Halder signed for Dempo with three other players Alwyn George, Holicharan Narzary and Narayan Das. He made his debut for Dempo in the I-League on 1 November 2013 against Mohun Bagan at the Duler Stadium and played the whole match which ended in a 0–0 draw.

==== FC Goa (loan) ====
Halder represented FC Goa during the 2014 Indian Super League but did not feature in any game, due to an injury, which kept him out of most of the 2014-15 I-League season. Halder was signed up by FC Goa again on loan from Dempo for the 2015 ISL.

=== Mohun Bagan ===
On 30 December 2015, Halder signed two-year contract with Mohun Bagan. Coach Sanjoy Sen said in a press conference later in the week that Halder was an "inspirational young talent".

==== 2015-16 season ====
On 16 January 2016, Halder made his debut for Mohun Bagan against Salgaocar which Bagan won 4–2. Halder has made a total of 10 appearances in I-League season and was awarded Man of the Match twice. He was the first choice defensive midfielder in Bagan but due to knee injury it kept him sidelined for 2 weeks. On 24 February 2016, Halder started for Bagan in AFC Cup against Maldives club Maziya S&RC.

==== 2016-2017 season ====
On 8 January 2017, Halder played against Churchill Brothers in first game of the season. He has also played in AFC Cup for Bagan in most of the group stage matches.

==== Mumbai City (loan) ====
Halder signed for Mumbai City for 2016 ISL season.

=== FC Goa ===
On 23 July 2017, Halder got picked by Goa in ISL Draft for 2017–18 season.

=== ATK ===
In June 2018, ATK has signed Halder on a two-year deal. He became the number one choice for coach Steve Coppell in midfield.

=== Jamshedpur ===
In September 2021, Jamshedpur loaned in Pronay for the upcoming season. He returned to the city where he made his start as a football player with Tata Football Academy.

He made his debut for the club against East Bengal, on 21 November, in a 1–1 stalemate. On 15 March, he scored his only goal of the season in the playoffs semi-final second leg, against Kerala Blasters in a 1–1 (1–2 agg) draw.

== International ==
=== Youth ===
Halder played for India U19, and was involved in three matches and scored against Uzbekistan U19.

He was the part of India U23 for 2013 AFC U-22 Asian Cup qualification which was held in Oman from 23 June 2012. Halder played 4 matches during the tournament.

=== Senior ===
Halder became the 496th player to earn a senior cap for India on 31 August 2015 against Nepal in an International friendly. Halder scored a stunning long ranger on his debut for India against Chinese Taipei in Intercontinental Cup in Mumbai.

== Career statistics ==
=== Club ===
As of 22 May 2023

Club	Season	League			Cup		AFC		Total	
Club	Season	Division	Apps	Goals	Apps	Goals	Apps	Goals	Apps	Goals
Pailan Arrows	2011–12	I-League	3	0	0	0	—		3	0
Pailan Arrows	2012–13	I-League	21	1	4 (Note: Appearance(s) in Federation Cup) (Note: Appearance(s) in Durand Cup)	0	—		25	1
Pailan Arrows	Palian Arrows total		24	1	4	0	0	0	28	1
Dempo	2013–14	I-League	17	0	4	0	—		21	0
Dempo	2014–15	I-League	3	0	0	0	—		3	0
Dempo	Dempo total		20	0	4	0	0	0	24	0
Mohun Bagan	2015–16	I-League	11	0	1	0	7 (Note: Appearance(s) in AFC Champions League) (Note: Appearance(s) in AFC Cup)	0	19	0
Mohun Bagan	2016–17	I-League	9	0	0	0	1	0	10	0
Mohun Bagan	Mohun Bagan total		20	0	1	0	8	0	29	0
Goa (loan)	2015	Indian Super League	8	0	0	0	—		8	0
Mumbai City (loan)	2016	Indian Super League	5	0	0	0	—		5	0
Goa	2017–18	Indian Super League	13	0	2 (Note: Appearance(s) in Super Cup)	0	—		15	0
ATK	2018–19	Indian Super League	14	0	2	0	—		16	0
ATK	2019–20	Indian Super League	8	1	0	0	—		8	1
ATK	ATK total		22	1	2	0	0	0	24	1
Mohun Bagan	2020–21	Indian Super League	16	0	0	0	—		16	0
Mohun Bagan	2022–23	Indian Super League	2	0	0	0	—		2	0
Mohun Bagan	ATKMB total		18	0	0	0	0	0	18	0
Jamshedpur (loan)	2021–22	Indian Super League	14	1	0	0	—		14	1
Jamshedpur	2022–23	Indian Super League	7	0	2	0	1 (Note: Appearance in playoff for AFC Champions League)	0	10	0
Career total			151	3	15	0	9	0	175	3

=== International ===
As of 7 June 2021

National team	Year	Apps	Goals
India	2015	5	0
India	2016	5	0
India	2017	0	0
India	2018	4	1
India	2019	6	0
India	2021	2	0
Total		22	1

Scores and results list India's goal tally first.

Goal	Date	Venue	Opponent	Score	Result	Competition	Ref.
1.	1 June 2018	Mumbai Football Arena, Mumbai, India	Chinese Taipei	5–0	5–0	2018 Intercontinental Cup	

== Honours ==
India

- SAFF Championship: 2015
- Intercontinental Cup: 2018
- King's Cup third place: 2019

Jamshedpur

- Indian Super League Premiers: 2021–22
