= Ravi Bahadur Rana =

Indian footballer (born 2002)

Ravi Rana
Personal information
- Full name: Ravi Bahadur Rana
- Date of birth: 15 October 2002 (age 24)
- Place of birth: Jammu, Jammu and Kashmir, India
- Position: Right back

Youth career
- 2016–2017: Tata Football Academy

Senior career*
Years	Team	Apps	(Gls)
2018–2020	Jamshedpur B	6	(0)
2020–2021	Himalayan Sherpa Club		
2021–2025	Mohun Bagan	4	(0)

International career
2017	India U15	4	(4)
2019	India U18	7	(1)
- * Club domestic league appearances and goals as of 20:34, 23 December 2023 (UTC)

Ravi Bahadur Rana (born 15 October 2002) is an Indian professional footballer who plays as a defender.

== Club career ==
Born in Jammu, Rana joined Tata Football Academy in Jamshedpur in 2016. He is the first player from Jammu and Kashmir to join the academy. Over the years, he was promoted from Jamshedpur FC U18s to Jamshedpur FC Reserves.

He had a short stint with Napali side Himalayan Sherpa Club after the 2019 SAFF U-18 Championship.

In 2021, Rana signed for Mohun Bagan. He made his debut on 1 December 2022, as an 89th-minute substitute in a 5–1 defeat against Mumbai City in the Indian Super League. He was included in the Mohun Bagan squad for the 2022 AFC Cup. He made his AFC Cup debut in a 5–0 win over Blue Star SC on 12 August 2022. On 10 July 2022, Mohun Bagan SG announced a three-year contract extension with Rana.

== International career ==
In July 2017, Rana was called up to the India national under-15 team squad for the 2017 SAFF U-15 Championship. He scored four goals in the championship, including a hat-trick against Maldives. He scored the winner for the India national under-18 team in the 2019 SAFF U-18 Championship final.

== Career statistics ==
=== Club ===
As of 24 December 2023

Club	Season	League			National cup (Note: Includes Super Cup)		AFC		Other		Total	
Club	Season	Division	Apps	Goals	Apps	Goals	Apps	Goals	Apps	Goals	Apps	Goals
Jamshedpur B	2020	I-League 2nd Division	6	0	0	0	–		–		6	0
Mohun Bagan	2021–22	Indian Super League	1	0	–		3 (Note: Appearances in AFC Cup)	0	0	0	4	0
Mohun Bagan	2022–23	Indian Super League	1	0	0	0	0	0	2 (Note: Appearances in Durand Cup)	0	3	0
Mohun Bagan	2023–24	Indian Super League	2	0	2	0	1	0	–		5	0
Mohun Bagan	Total		4	0	2	0	4	0	2	0	12	0
Career total			10	0	2	0	4	0	2	0	18	0

== Honours ==
India U15

- SAFF U-15 Championship: 2017

India U18

- SAFF U-18 Championship: 2019

Mohun Bagan

- Indian Super League: 2022–23
