= Manuel Cascallana =

Spanish football manager (born 1983)

Personal information
- Full name: Manuel Pérez Cascallana De Ramón
- Date of birth: 21 May 1983 (age 43)
- Place of birth: Madrid, Spain

Youth career
- Las Rozas

Senior career*
Years	Team	Apps	(Gls)
2007–2010	Las Rozas		

Managerial career
- 2007–2010: Las Rozas (youth)
- 2010–2011: West Ham united U16 (assistant)
- 2011–2013: Rayo Majadahonda (youth)
- 2014–2015: Amistad
- 2018–2019: FPA Las Rozas (youth)
- 2019–2020: ATK (assistant)
- 2020: ATK (interim)
- 2020–2021: Mohun Bagan (assistant)
- 2021–2022: Mohun Bagan (interim)
- 2022: Persib Bandung (assistant)
- 2024: Mohun Bagan (assistant)
- * Club domestic league appearances and goals

Manuel Pérez-Cascallana de Ramón (born 21 May 1983) is a Spanish football coach and former player.

== Career ==
Cascallana was a Las Rozas CF youth graduate, breaking into the first team in 2007; while involved with the first team squad, he also managed the youth categories. In 2010, he moved abroad to complete his studying qualifications, and joined West Ham United's Academy as an assistant manager of the under-16 squad.

Returning to Spain in 2011, Cascallana worked at CF Rayo Majadahonda and Atlético Madrid before being appointed manager of CDE Amistad in August 2014. He subsequently returned to Atleti to work with the club's campus in Spain and abroad.

In 2018, Cascallana joined CDE FPA Las Rozas as a sporting director, also managing the club's Alevín C squad. In August 2019, he was named Antonio López's assistant at Indian Super League club ATK.

In January 2020, as López was suspended, Cascallana took over ATK for two matches, a 2–0 success over FC Goa and 1–0 win over NorthEast United FC.

== Personal life ==
Cascallana's father Carlos was also involved with football, notably working as an assistant at Fenerbahçe SK and Beşiktaş JK.
