= Shreyas Ketkar =

Indian footballer (born 2003)

Personal information
- Date of birth: 1 November 2003 (age 23)
- Place of birth: Bengaluru, India
- Position: Central midfielder

Team information
- Current team: Bengaluru
- Number: 46

Youth career
- Roots FC
- 2019–2020: Bengaluru United

Senior career*
Years	Team	Apps	(Gls)
2020–2021	Bengaluru United	1	(0)
2020–2021	→ Indian Arrows (loan)	14	(0)
2021–2022	Indian Arrows	6	(0)
2022-23	Bengaluru B	20	(3)
2023–	Bengaluru	20	(2)
- * Club domestic league appearances and goals as of 12:20, 7 July 2024 (UTC)

Shreyas Ketkar (born 1 November 2003) is an Indian professional footballer who plays as a central midfielder for Indian Super League club Bengaluru.

== Career ==
Shreyas Ketkar made his first professional appearance for Indian Arrows on 10 January 2021 against Churchill Brothers.

== Career statistics ==
=== Club ===
As of 08 July 2024

Club	Season	League			Cup		AFC		Total	
Club	Season	Division	Apps	Goals	Apps	Goals	Apps	Goals	Apps	Goals
Bengaluru United	2020	I-League 2nd Division	1	0	0	0	—		1	0
Indian Arrows (loan)	2020–21	I-League	14	0	0	0	—		14	0
Indian Arrows	2021–22	I-League	6	0	2 (Note: Appearance(s) in IFA Shield)	0	—		8	0
Bengaluru B	2023-24	Reliance Foundation Development League	20	3	0	0	—		20	0
Career total			41	3	2	0	0	0	43	3
