= Brijesh Giri =

Indian footballer (born 2003)

Personal information
- Full name: Brijesh Giri
- Date of birth: 7 January 2003 (age 23)
- Place of birth: Darjeeling, West Bengal, India
- Position: Left back

Team information
- Current team: Rajasthan United
- Number: 77

Youth career
- Indian Arrows

Senior career*
Years	Team	Apps	(Gls)
2021–2022	Indian Arrows	22	(2)
2022–	Mohun Bagan SG		

International career
2022–	India U20		
- * Club domestic league appearances and goals as of 19:40, 4 May 2022 (UTC)

Brijesh Giri (born 7 January 2003) is an Indian professional footballer who plays as a defender for Indian Football League club Rajasthan United.

== Club career ==
Born in Darjeeling, West Bengal, Giri made his professional debut for I-League side Indian Arrows on 14 January 2021 against Sudeva Delhi. He came on as a second-half stoppage time substitute as Indian Arrows were defeated 0–3.

== Career statistics ==
=== Club ===
As of 4 May 2022

Club	Season	League			Cup		AFC		Total	
Club	Season	Division	Apps	Goals	Apps	Goals	Apps	Goals	Apps	Goals
Indian Arrows	2020–21	I-League	6	0	0	0	—		6	0
Indian Arrows	2021–22	I-League	16	2	0	0	—		16	2
Career total			22	2	0	0	0	0	22	2

== Honours ==
India U20

- SAFF U-20 Championship: 2022
