= Next Generation Cup =

PL and ISL Joint Tournament

- Organiser(s): (England) Premier League (India) Indian Super League (South Africa) SA Premiership
- Founded: 2020; 6 years ago
- Teams: 6–8
- Related competitions: (England) Premier League 2 (India) Development League (South Africa) PSL Reserve League
- Current champions: (England) Wolverhampton Wanderers (1st title)
- Most championships: (South Africa) Stellenbosch (2 titles)
- Broadcaster: YouTube (live streaming)

The Premier League Next Generation Cup or Prem NXT Gen Cup, is a youth football tournament organised by the Premier League in collaboration with Indian Super League and South African Premier Division, as part of the Premier League Youth Games initiative.

== History ==
In 2019, as a part of the Premier League Youth Games initiative, youth players of Arsenal F.C. and Leicester City FC visited India to play against RFYC and Mumbai City FC youth teams. First edition of the Next Generation Cup was organised at Reliance Corporate Park in Navi Mumbai. 6 teams took part in the competition, three Indian Super League U-15 teams and three Premier League U-14 teams.

== Winners ==
| Year | Host | Winners | Ref. |
|---|---|---|---|
| 2020 | (India) Navi Mumbai | (England) Chelsea | |
| 2022 | (England) Leicester (Midlands/Group A) | (South Africa) Stellenbosch | |
| 2022 | (England) London (London/Group B) | (England) West Ham United | |
| 2023 | (India) Navi Mumbai | (England) Wolverhampton Wanderers | |
| 2024 | (England) London | (South Africa) Stellenbosch (2) | |

== 2020 tournament ==
=== Teams ===
Under–14 and under–15 tournament
| (England) English teams | (India) Indian teams |
|---|---|
| Manchester United | RFYC |
| Chelsea | FC Goa |
| Southampton | Bengaluru FC |

=== League stage ===
All matches played at Reliance Corporate Park, Ghansoli, Navi Mumbai, Maharashtra, India.

| Pos | Team | Pld | W | D | L | GF | GA | GD | Pts | Qualification | (England) CHE | (England) MNU | (India) RFYC | (India) FCG | (England) SOU | (India) BEN |
|---|---|---|---|---|---|---|---|---|---|---|---|---|---|---|---|---|
| 1 | (England) Chelsea | 5 | 5 | 0 | 0 | 15 | 1 | +14 | 15 | Champions | — | 1–0 | — | 5–0 | 2–0 | 4–0 |
| 2 | (England) Manchester United | 5 | 3 | 0 | 2 | 12 | 4 | +8 | 9 | | — | — | 0–1 | — | — | 5–1 |
| 3 | (India) RFYC | 5 | 3 | 0 | 2 | 7 | 4 | +3 | 9 | | 1–3 | — | — | 0–1 | — | — |
| 4 | (India) FC Goa | 5 | 3 | 0 | 2 | 4 | 10 | −6 | 9 | | — | 0–4 | — | — | 1–0 | — |
| 5 | (England) Southampton | 5 | 0 | 1 | 4 | 2 | 10 | −8 | 1 | | — | 1–3 | 0–3 | — | — | 1–1 |
| 6 | (India) Bengaluru FC | 5 | 0 | 1 | 4 | 3 | 14 | −11 | 1 | | — | — | 0–2 | 1–2 | — | — |

Source: KhelNow

== 2022 tournament ==
=== Teams ===
Under-21 tournament
| (England) English teams | Group | (India) Indian teams | Group | (South Africa) South African team | Group |
|---|---|---|---|---|---|
| Tottenham Hotspur | London (B) | Kerala Blasters | London (B) | Stellenbosch FC | Midlands (A) |
| Leicester City | Midlands (A) | Bengaluru | Midlands (A) | | |
| West Ham United | London (B) | | | | |
| Crystal Palace | London (B) | | | | |
| Nottingham Forest | Midlands (A) | | | | |

=== Midlands (Group A) ===
All matches played at Leicester City F.C. Training Ground, Leicester, East Midlands, United Kingdom.

Semifinals
1 | (England) Leicester City | 6
2 | (India) Bengaluru | 3
3 | (England) Nottingham Forest | 1
4 | (South Africa) Stellenbosch l | 4

Final
1 | (England) Leicester City | 2
4 | (South Africa) Stellenbosch | 7
Third place
2 | (India) Bengaluru | 1
3 | (England) Nottingham Forest | 6

=== London (Group B) ===
All matches played at Hotspur Way, Tottenham, London, United Kingdom.

Semifinals
1 | (England) Tottenham Hotspur | 7
2 | (India) Kerala Blasters | 0
3 | (England) Crystal Palace | 3
4 | (England) West Ham United | 4

Final
1 | (England) Tottenham Hotspur | 0
4 | (England) West Ham United | 8
Third place
2 | (India) Kerala Blasters | 1
3 | (England) Crystal Palace | 4

== 2023 tournament ==
=== Teams ===
Under-21 tournament
| (India) Indian teams | Group | (England) English teams | Group | (South Africa) South African team | Group |
|---|---|---|---|---|---|
| Mohun Bagan SG | A | Everton | B | Stellenbosch FC | A |
| Bengaluru | A | West Ham United | A | | |
| RFYC | B | Wolverhampton Wanderers | B | | |
| Sudeva Delhi | B | | | | |

=== Group stage ===
All matches played at Reliance Corporate Park, Ghansoli, Navi Mumbai, Maharashtra, India.

=== Group A ===
| Pos | Team | Pld | W | D | L | GF | GA | GD | Pts | Qualification | (South Africa) STB | (England) WHAM | (India) MBSG | (India) BEN |
|---|---|---|---|---|---|---|---|---|---|---|---|---|---|---|
| 1 | (South Africa) Stellenbosch FC | 3 | 2 | 1 | 0 | 6 | 3 | +3 | 7 | Advance to final | — | 3–3 | — | — |
| 2 | (England) West Ham United | 3 | 1 | 2 | 0 | 8 | 4 | +4 | 5 | Advance to third-place playoff | — | — | 1–1 | 4–0 |
| 3 | (India) Mohun Bagan SG | 3 | 0 | 2 | 1 | 1 | 3 | −2 | 2 | Advance to fifth-place playoff | 0–2 | — | — | 0–0 |
| 4 | (India) Bengaluru | 3 | 0 | 1 | 2 | 0 | 5 | −5 | 1 | Advance to seventh-place playoff | 0–1 | — | — | — |

Source: RFDL, PL

=== Group B ===
| Pos | Team | Pld | W | D | L | GF | GA | GD | Pts | Qualification | (England) WOL | (England) EVE | (India) RFYC | (India) SUD |
|---|---|---|---|---|---|---|---|---|---|---|---|---|---|---|
| 1 | (England) Wolverhampton Wanderers | 3 | 3 | 0 | 0 | 10 | 0 | +10 | 9 | Advance to final | — | — | 2–0 | 4–0 |
| 2 | (England) Everton | 3 | 2 | 0 | 1 | 3 | 5 | −2 | 6 | Advance to third-place playoff | 0–4 | — | 2–1 | — |
| 3 | (India) RFYC | 3 | 1 | 0 | 2 | 2 | 4 | −2 | 3 | Advance to fifth-place playoff | — | — | — | — |
| 4 | (India) Sudeva Delhi | 3 | 0 | 0 | 3 | 0 | 6 | −6 | 0 | Advance to seventh-place playoff | — | 1–0 | 0–1 | — |

Source: RFDL, PL

=== Placement matches ===
All matches played at Reliance Corporate Park, Ghansoli, Navi Mumbai, Maharashtra, India.

7th place play-off
| Team 1 | Score | Team 2 |
|---|---|---|
| Bengaluru (India) | 2–1 | (India) Sudeva Delhi |

5th place play-off
| Team 1 | Score | Team 2 |
|---|---|---|
| Mohun Bagan SG (India) | 0–4 | (India) RFYC |

3rd place play-off
| Team 1 | Score | Team 2 |
|---|---|---|
| West Ham United (England) | 3–0 | (England) Everton |

Grand Final
| Team 1 | Score | Team 2 |
|---|---|---|
| Stellenbosch (South Africa) | 1–1 (4–5 p) | (England) Wolverhampton Wanderers |

Sources: RFDL, PL

== 2024 tournament ==
=== Teams ===
| No. | Teams | Group | Qualifiers |
|---|---|---|---|
| 1 | (India) Muthoot | B | 2024 RFDL Championship stage |
| 2 | (India) Punjab | B | 2024 RFDL Championship stage |
| 3 | (India) East Bengal | B | 2024 RFDL Championship stage |
| 4 | (England) Aston Villa | A | 2023–24 Premier League 2 |
| 5 | (England) Everton | A | 2023–24 Premier League 2 |
| 6 | (England) Tottenham Hotspur | A | 2023–24 Premier League 2 |
| 7 | (England) Crystal Palace | A | 2023–24 Premier League 2 |
| 8 | (South Africa) Stellenbosch | B | 2023–24 PSL Reserve League |

=== League stage ===
All matches played at main and secondary pitches of Bodymoor Heath Training Ground, Tamworth, Staffordshire, London, England. The league stage consists of eight teams with each team playing against any three of the seven other teams only. These teams are pre-seeded into two groups and the placement matches are decided via their positions in those respective groups. Aside from regular match and scoring system, a penalty shootout is held after each match, irrespective of the regular match. The winner of the penalty shootout gets an additional bonus point in their points table.

| Pos | Grp | Team | Pld | W | PW | D | PL | L | GF | GA | GD | Pts | Qualification | (England) TOT | (England) ASV | (South Africa) STB | (England) EVT | (England) CRP | (India) PUN | (India) MUT | (India) EAB |
|---|---|---|---|---|---|---|---|---|---|---|---|---|---|---|---|---|---|---|---|---|---|
| 1 | A | (England) Tottenham | 6 | 2 | 3 | 0 | 0 | 1 | 7 | 1 | +6 | 9 | Advance to final | — | — | — | — | — | 3–0 (6–5 P) | 4–0 (3–2 P) | — |
| 2 | A | (England) Aston Villa (H) | 6 | 2 | 3 | 0 | 0 | 1 | 7 | 3 | +4 | 9 | Advance to third-place playoff | — | — | 0–1 (4–3 P) | — | — | — | — | 4–0 (4–2 P) |
| 3 | B | (South Africa) Stellenbosch | 6 | 3 | 0 | 0 | 3 | 0 | 3 | 0 | +3 | 9 | Advance to final | 1–0 (4–5 P) | — | — | — | — | — | — | — |
| 4 | A | (England) Everton | 6 | 2 | 2 | 0 | 1 | 1 | 8 | 2 | +6 | 8 | Advance to fifth-place playoff | — | — | — | — | — | 1–2 (3–4 P) | 1–0 (4–2 P) | — |
| 5 | A | (England) Crystal Palace | 6 | 2 | 2 | 0 | 1 | 1 | 4 | 1 | +3 | 8 | Advance to seventh-place playoff | — | — | 0–1 (5–4 P) | — | — | — | — | 1–0 (4–2 P) |
| 6 | B | (India) Punjab | 6 | 1 | 1 | 0 | 2 | 2 | 4 | 7 | −3 | 4 | Advance to third-place playoff | — | 2–3 (5–3 P) | — | — | — | — | — | — |
| 7 | B | (India) Muthoot | 6 | 0 | 1 | 0 | 2 | 3 | 0 | 8 | −8 | 1 | Advance to fifth-place playoff | — | — | — | — | 0–3 (5–4 P) | — | — | — |
| 8 | B | (India) East Bengal | 6 | 0 | 0 | 0 | 3 | 3 | 0 | 11 | −11 | 0 | Advance to seventh-place playoff | — | — | — | 0–6 (1–4 P) | — | — | — | — |

(H) Host

=== Placement matches ===
All matches played at main and secondary pitches of Bodymoor Heath Training Ground, Tamworth, Staffordshire, London, England with the final to take place at Loughborough University Stadium, Loughborough, Leicestershire, England.

7th place play-off
| Team 1 | Score | Team 2 |
|---|---|---|
| (England) Crystal Palace | 7–1 | (India) East Bengal |

5th place play-off
| Team 1 | Score | Team 2 |
|---|---|---|
| (England) Everton | 6–1 | (India) Muthoot |

3rd place play-off
| Team 1 | Score | Team 2 |
|---|---|---|
| (England) Aston Villa | 0–2 | (India) Punjab |

Grand Final
| Team 1 | Score | Team 2 |
|---|---|---|
| (England) Tottenham | 0–2 | (South Africa) Stellenbosch |

Sources: RFDL, PL

== 2025 tournament ==
=== Teams ===
| No. | Teams | Group | Qualifiers |
|---|---|---|---|
| 1 | (India) Mohun Bagan | | 2024–25 RFDL Championship stage |
| 2 | (India) Goa | | 2024–25 RFDL Championship stage |
| 3 | (India) Jamshedpur | | 2024–25 RFDL Championship stage |
