= 2025 Reliance Foundation Development League =

2024-25 RFDL season

Reliance Foundation Development League
- Season: 2024–25
- Dates: 25 November 2024 – 14 April 2025
- Champions: Mohun Bagan SG; 1st RFDL title
- Next Gen Cup: Mohun Bagan SG; Goa; Jamshedpur
- Matches: 278
- Goals: 959 (3.45 per match)
- Best Player: Md Arbash (Classic FA)
- Top goalscorer: Lawmsangzuala (16 goals)
- Best goalkeeper: Priyansh Dubey (10 clean sheets)

The 2024–25 Reliance Foundation Development League was the fourth season of the Reliance Foundation Development League, developmental football league organised by the Reliance Foundation and the AIFF.

The season features 54 teams divided into nine regions, held across multiple regions from 25 November 2024. Punjab FC are the defending champions.

== Format ==
The teams may include up to four players born on or after January 1, 2002, in their matchday squads, with no more than two on the playing XI at a time. Participants in the league must have been born on or after January 1, 2004.

This season features the league's most extensive outreach, divided into four phases: Regional qualifiers, Zonal group stage, National group stage and the National championship. With the introduction of a Zonal stage that will see the top teams from each region play more matches versus higher quality opposition.

Each team will play at least 5 matches in the regional qualifiers. 24 teams will qualify for the Zonal group stage from the regional qualifiers. 12 sides from pan India that top the Zonal stage progress to the National group stage. The National group stage will feature 30 matches across 2 groups with the winners & runners-up from each group booking their spot for the National Championship.

== Teams ==
Teams are divided into 9 zones for the regional qualifiers, each containing 6 teams.

State/Region	Venue	Clubs	App (last)
East	Kalyani Stadium B, Kalyani; Naihati Stadium, Naihati	Diamond Harbour FC	Debut
East	Kalyani Stadium B, Kalyani; Naihati Stadium, Naihati	East Bengal FC	3rd (2024)
East	Kalyani Stadium B, Kalyani; Naihati Stadium, Naihati	Mohammedan SC	3rd (2024)
East	Kalyani Stadium B, Kalyani; Naihati Stadium, Naihati	Mohun Bagan SG	3rd (2024)
East	Kalyani Stadium B, Kalyani; Naihati Stadium, Naihati	Odisha FC	3rd (2024)
East	Kalyani Stadium B, Kalyani; Naihati Stadium, Naihati	United SC	3rd (2024)
Goa	Duler Stadium, Mapusa	Churchill Brothers FC Goa	2nd (2023)
Goa	Duler Stadium, Mapusa	Clube de Salgaocar	2nd (2023) (Note: Previously played as Salgaocar FC)
Goa	Duler Stadium, Mapusa	Dempo SC	3rd (2024)
Goa	Duler Stadium, Mapusa	FC Goa	4th (2024)
Goa	Duler Stadium, Mapusa	SESA FA	3rd (2024)
Goa	Duler Stadium, Mapusa	Sporting Clube de Goa	2nd (2024)
Kerala	Maharajas College Stadium, Ernakulam	Gokulam Kerala FC	3rd (2024)
Kerala	Maharajas College Stadium, Ernakulam	Kerala Blasters FC	4th (2024)
Kerala	Maharajas College Stadium, Ernakulam	Kerala United FC	Debut
Kerala	Maharajas College Stadium, Ernakulam	Muthoot FA	3rd (2024)
Kerala	Maharajas College Stadium, Ernakulam	Parappur FC Kerala	3rd (2024)
Kerala	Maharajas College Stadium, Ernakulam	Wayanad United FC	2nd (2024)
Meghalaya–Assam	Meghalaya Football Ground, Shillong	4ForAll FC	2nd (2024)
Meghalaya–Assam	Meghalaya Football Ground, Shillong	Little Star Academy	2nd (2024)
Meghalaya–Assam	Meghalaya Football Ground, Shillong	NorthEast United FC	3rd (2024)
Meghalaya–Assam	Meghalaya Football Ground, Shillong	PRYCC Shillong	Debut
Meghalaya–Assam	Meghalaya Football Ground, Shillong	Rangdajied United FC	2nd (2023)
Meghalaya–Assam	Meghalaya Football Ground, Shillong	Shillong Lajong FC	3rd (2024)
Mizoram	1st Bn. MAP Ground, Aizawl	Aizawl FC	Debut
Mizoram	1st Bn. MAP Ground, Aizawl	Greenfield FA	Debut
Mizoram	1st Bn. MAP Ground, Aizawl	Kanan SC	Debut
Mizoram	1st Bn. MAP Ground, Aizawl	Kulikawn FC	2nd (2024)
Mizoram	1st Bn. MAP Ground, Aizawl	Mizoram YFF	Debut
Mizoram	1st Bn. MAP Ground, Aizawl	Zemabawk North FC	Debut
Mumbai	Neville D'Souza Football Turf, Bandra, Mumbai	Kenkre FC	3rd (2024)
Mumbai	Neville D'Souza Football Turf, Bandra, Mumbai	Maharashtra Oranje FC	2nd (2024)
Mumbai	Neville D'Souza Football Turf, Bandra, Mumbai	MYJ–GMSC	2nd (2024)
Mumbai	Neville D'Souza Football Turf, Bandra, Mumbai	Millat FC	2nd (2024)
Mumbai	Neville D'Souza Football Turf, Bandra, Mumbai	Mumbai City FC	4th (2024)
Mumbai	Neville D'Souza Football Turf, Bandra, Mumbai	RFYC	4th (2024)
North	Sudeva Academy, Civil Lines, Delhi; Frontier FC Ground, Chhawla, Delhi	Delhi FC	2nd (2024)
North	Sudeva Academy, Civil Lines, Delhi; Frontier FC Ground, Chhawla, Delhi	Garhwal Heroes FC	2nd (2023)
North	Sudeva Academy, Civil Lines, Delhi; Frontier FC Ground, Chhawla, Delhi	Namdhari FC	Debut
North	Sudeva Academy, Civil Lines, Delhi; Frontier FC Ground, Chhawla, Delhi	Punjab FC	3rd (2024)
North	Sudeva Academy, Civil Lines, Delhi; Frontier FC Ground, Chhawla, Delhi	Rajasthan United FC	3rd (2024)
North	Sudeva Academy, Civil Lines, Delhi; Frontier FC Ground, Chhawla, Delhi	Sudeva Delhi FC	3rd (2024)
ROI–NorthEast	Meghalaya Football Ground, Shillong	Classic FA	2nd (2023)
ROI–NorthEast	Meghalaya Football Ground, Shillong	Football 4 Change Academy	2nd (2023)
ROI–NorthEast	Meghalaya Football Ground, Shillong	Jamshedpur FC	4th (2024)
ROI–NorthEast	Meghalaya Football Ground, Shillong	SAI-RC	2nd (2023)
ROI–NorthEast	Meghalaya Football Ground, Shillong	Senapati FC	Debut
ROI–NorthEast	Meghalaya Football Ground, Shillong	Todo United FC	Debut
South	Bangalore Football Stadium, Bengaluru; HAL SC Stadium, Bengaluru	BIFA	Debut
South	Bangalore Football Stadium, Bengaluru; HAL SC Stadium, Bengaluru	Bengaluru FC	4th (2024)
South	Bangalore Football Stadium, Bengaluru; HAL SC Stadium, Bengaluru	Chennaiyin FC	4th (2024)
South	Bangalore Football Stadium, Bengaluru; HAL SC Stadium, Bengaluru	Kickstart FC	3rd (2024)
South	Bangalore Football Stadium, Bengaluru; HAL SC Stadium, Bengaluru	Roots FC	3rd (2024)
South	Bangalore Football Stadium, Bengaluru; HAL SC Stadium, Bengaluru	Sreenidi Deccan FC	3rd (2024)

== Season summary ==
The fourth season of the Reliance Foundation Development League kicked off in Goa, on 25 November 2024. A total of 12 teams were making their debut appearance in the competition. Sporting Clube de Goa and Dempo SC played the opening game of the Regional qualifiers at the Duler Stadium.

After 135 matches, a total of 24 teams qualified to the Zonal group stage from the Regional qualifiers. Shillong Lajong scored the most goals in the stage, netting 23 times, and also recorded the highest number of clean sheets with 4, a feat they shared with Mohun Bagan SG and NorthEast United. Seiminthang Khongsai of Delhi FC emerged as the top scorer of the stage, finding the net eight times.

The National group stage began on 23 March 2025, with two groups comprising six teams each locked horns at the Reliance Corporate Park, Navi Mumbai.

== Regional qualifiers ==
=== East region ===
Pos	Team	Pld	W	D	L	GF	GA	GD	Pts	Qualification
1	Mohun Bagan SG	5	3	2	0	8	1	+7	11	Advance to Zonal group stage
2	East Bengal	5	2	2	1	6	5	+1	8	Advance to Zonal group stage
3	Diamond Harbour	5	2	2	1	11	6	+5	8	Advance to Zonal group stage
4	Odisha	5	2	2	1	8	7	+1	8	
5	Mohammedan	5	2	0	3	6	8	−2	6	
6	United SC	5	0	0	5	2	14	−12	0	

Source: RFDL

==== Top scorers ====
Rank	Player	Club	Goals
1	Kartik Hantal	Odisha	5
2	Benjamin Lalnunpula	Diamond Harbour	3
2	Bamiya Samad	Mohammedan SC	3
2	Serto Worneilen Kom	Mohun Bagan SG	3
5	Andrews A	East Bengal	2

=== Goa region ===
Pos	Team	Pld	W	D	L	GF	GA	GD	Pts	Qualification
1	Dempo SC	5	3	2	0	13	3	+10	11	Advance to Zonal group stage
2	FC Goa	5	3	0	2	13	6	+7	9	Advance to Zonal group stage
3	SESA FA	5	2	2	1	9	6	+3	8	Advance to Zonal group stage
4	Clube de Salgaocar	5	1	2	2	8	7	+1	5	
5	SC de Goa	5	1	2	2	9	14	−5	5	
6	Churchill Brothers	5	1	0	4	6	22	−16	3	

Source: RFDL

==== Top scorers ====
Rank	Player	Club	Goals
1	Francisco Fernandes	SC de Goa	6
2	Mevan Shawn Dias	Dempo	5
3	Isac Zomuanpuia	Clube de Salgaocar	4
4	Lalthangliana	FC Goa	3
4	Sankalp Sandeep Kankonkar	SESA FA	3
4	Likson Rebelo	FC Goa	3

=== Kerala region ===
Pos	Team	Pld	W	D	L	GF	GA	GD	Pts	Qualification
1	Muthoot FA	5	4	1	0	15	4	+11	13	Advance to Zonal group stage
2	Gokulam Kerala	5	4	0	1	10	5	+5	12	Advance to Zonal group stage
3	Kerala Blasters	5	3	0	2	10	8	+2	9	Advance to Zonal group stage
4	Parappur FC Kerala	5	1	1	3	6	8	−2	4	
5	Kerala United	5	1	0	4	6	10	−4	3	
6	Wayanad United	5	1	0	4	6	18	−12	3	

Source: RFDL

==== Top scorers ====
Rank	Player	Club	Goals
1	Sujin S	Kerala Blasters	5
2	Abith KB	Muthoot FA	4
2	Harshal Rahman	Muthoot FA	4
4	Ebindas Yesudas	Kerala Blasters	3
4	Muhammed Sanad P	Gokulam Kerala	3
4	Chabungbam Linky Meitei	Kerala United	3

=== Meghalaya–Assam region ===
Pos	Team	Pld	W	D	L	GF	GA	GD	Pts	Qualification
1	NorthEast United	5	5	0	0	18	1	+17	15	Advance to Zonal group stage
2	Shillong Lajong	5	4	0	1	23	2	+21	12	Advance to Zonal group stage
3	Rangdajied United	5	3	0	2	7	10	−3	9	
4	4ForAll FC	5	2	0	3	11	11	0	6	
5	Little Star Academy	5	1	0	4	5	10	−5	3	
6	PRYCC Shillong	5	0	0	5	1	31	−30	0	

Source: RFDL

==== Top scorers ====
Rank	Player	Club	Goals
1	Gunleiba Wangkheirakpam	NorthEast United	5
1	Samborlang Langte	4ForAll FC	5
1	Babysunday Marngar	Shillong Lajong	5
1	Emanbha Marbaniang	Shillong Lajong	5
5	Yohaan Benjamin	Shillong Lajong	4
5	Freddy Banteilang Jyrwa	Rangdajied United	4

=== Mizoram region ===
Pos	Team	Pld	W	D	L	GF	GA	GD	Pts	Qualification
1	Mizoram YFF	5	4	0	1	17	8	+9	12	Advance to Zonal group stage
2	Aizawl	5	4	0	1	17	7	+10	12	Advance to Zonal group stage
3	Kanan SC	5	3	0	2	15	10	+5	9	
4	Greenfield FA	5	2	0	3	11	15	−4	6	
5	Zemabawk North FC	5	1	0	4	8	19	−11	3	
6	Kulikawn FC	5	1	0	4	6	15	−9	3	

Source: RFDL

==== Top scorers ====
Rank	Player	Club	Goals
1	Lalrinhlua	Aizawl	5
2	Elisa Lalchamliana	Aizawl	4
2	Simon Lalnilien Zote	Kanan SC	4
2	Lalbiaktluanga	Mizoram YFF	4
2	Emanuel Lalhruaizela	Mizoram YFF	4

=== Mumbai region ===
Pos	Team	Pld	W	D	L	GF	GA	GD	Pts	Qualification
1	Maharashtra Oranje	5	4	1	0	13	4	+9	13	Advance to Zonal group stage
2	RFYC	5	3	1	1	9	6	+3	10	Advance to Zonal group stage
3	Millat FC	5	3	1	1	7	6	+1	10	
4	MYJ–GMSC	5	1	2	2	7	8	−1	5	
5	Mumbai City	5	1	1	3	8	8	0	4	Advance to Zonal group stage
6	Kenkre FC	5	0	0	5	1	13	−12	0	

Source: RFDL

==== Top scorers ====
Rank	Player	Club	Goals
1	Pratham Ghatnur	Maharashtra Oranje	3
1	Gyamar Nikum	Mumbai City	3
1	F Vanlalchhanchhuaha	RFYC	3
1	Mohammed Khatib	Maharashtra Oranje	3
1	Ansh Tembulkar	RFYC	3
6	Aditya Gopireddy	MYJ-GMSC	2

=== North region ===
Pos	Team	Pld	W	D	L	GF	GA	GD	Pts	Qualification
1	Delhi FC	5	4	1	0	22	5	+17	13	Advance to Zonal group stage
2	Garhwal Heroes	5	3	1	1	13	6	+7	10	Advance to Zonal group stage
3	Sudeva Delhi	5	3	0	2	14	4	+10	9	Advance to Zonal group stage
4	Punjab	5	2	1	2	8	8	0	7	
5	Namdhari	5	1	1	3	4	13	−9	4	
6	Rajasthan United	5	0	0	5	2	26	−24	0	

Source: RFDL

==== Top scorers ====
Rank	Player	Club	Goals
1	Seiminthang Khongsai	Delhi	8
2	Omang Dodum	Punjab	4
2	Jajo Prashan	Sudeva Delhi	4
2	Gwgwmsar Gayary	Delhi	4
5	Iashanbok Buhphang	Garhwal Heroes	3

=== ROI–NorthEast region ===
Pos	Team	Pld	W	D	L	GF	GA	GD	Pts	Qualification
1	Jamshedpur	5	4	1	0	20	2	+18	13	Advance to Zonal group stage
2	Classic FA	5	4	1	0	12	2	+10	13	Advance to Zonal group stage
3	SAI-RC	5	3	0	2	9	8	+1	9	
4	Football 4 Change Academy	5	2	0	3	9	10	−1	6	
5	Todo United	5	1	0	4	5	23	−18	3	
6	Senapati FC	5	0	0	5	2	12	−10	0	

Source: RFDL

==== Top scorers ====
Rank	Player	Club	Goals
1	Lalhriatpuia Chawngthu	Jamshedpur	6
2	Lawmsangzuala	Jamshedpur	5
3	Kishor Tiwari	Football 4 Change Academy	4
4	Ningthoujam Remson Singh	Jamshedpur	3
4	Yendrembam Rohit Singh	Classic FA	3
4	Punit Thangjam	Classic FA	3

=== South region ===
Pos	Team	Pld	W	D	L	GF	GA	GD	Pts	Qualification
1	Sreenidi Deccan	5	3	1	1	15	4	+11	10	Advance to Zonal group stage
2	Kickstart FC	5	2	3	0	5	2	+3	9	Advance to Zonal group stage
3	Roots FC	5	2	2	1	5	4	+1	8	Advance to Zonal group stage
4	Chennaiyin	5	2	1	2	6	4	+2	7	
5	Bengaluru	5	1	3	1	12	5	+7	6	
6	BIFA	5	0	0	5	0	24	−24	0	

Source: RFDL

==== Top scorers ====
Rank	Player	Club	Goals
1	R Lalbiakliana	Sreenidi Deccan	4
1	Lalfamkima	Sreenidi Deccan	4
3	Soham Varshneya	Bengaluru	3
3	Taorem Kelvin Singh	Bengaluru	3
5	Rashid CK	Bengaluru	2
5	Deepak DP	Sreenidi Deccan	2

== Zonal group stage ==
=== Qualified teams ===
No.	Club	Qualified as
1	Mohun Bagan SG	East region champions
2	East Bengal	East region runners-up
3	Diamond Harbour	East region 3rd
4	Dempo SC	Goa region champions
5	FC Goa	Goa region runners-up
6	SESA FA	Goa region 3rd
7	Muthoot FA	Kerala region champions
8	Gokulam Kerala	Kerala region runners-up
9	Kerala Blasters	Kerala region 3rd
10	NorthEast United	Meghalaya–Assam region champions
11	Shillong Lajong	Meghalaya–Assam region runners-up
12	Mizoram YFF	Mizoram region champions
13	Aizawl	Mizoram region runners-up
14	Maharashtra Oranje	Mumbai region champions
15	RFYC	Mumbai region runners-up
16	Mumbai City	Mumbai region 3rd
17	Delhi FC	North region champions
18	Garhwal Heroes	North region runners-up
19	Sudeva Delhi	North region 3rd
20	Jamshedpur	ROI–NorthEast region champions
21	Classic FA	ROI–NorthEast region runners-up
22	Sreenidi Deccan	South region champions
23	Kickstart FC	South region runners-up
24	Roots FC	South region 3rd

=== Goa–Mumbai region ===
Pos	Team	Pld	W	D	L	GF	GA	GD	Pts	Qualification
1	Dempo SC	10	7	2	1	20	3	+17	23	Advance to National group stage
2	FC Goa	10	6	4	0	20	5	+15	22	Advance to National group stage
3	Mumbai City	10	3	2	5	24	27	−3	11	Advance to National group stage
4	RFYC	10	2	4	4	19	23	−4	10	
5	Maharashtra Oranje	10	2	2	6	13	27	−14	8	
6	SESA FA	10	1	4	5	8	19	−11	7	

Source: RFDL

==== Top scorers ====
Rank	Player	Club	Goals
1	Lalthangliana	FC Goa	6
1	Jovial Dias	FC Goa	6
1	Mohammed Kaif	Mumbai City	6
4	Ayush Chhikara	Mumbai City	5
5	Shreyash Gajanan Naik	Dempo	4

=== Kerala–South region ===
Pos	Team	Pld	W	D	L	GF	GA	GD	Pts	Qualification
1	Muthoot FA	10	5	4	1	21	7	+14	19	Advance to National group stage
2	Kickstart FC	10	4	4	2	19	12	+7	16	Advance to National group stage
3	Sreenidi Deccan	10	3	5	2	10	14	−4	14	Advance to National group stage
4	Kerala Blasters	10	3	4	3	17	13	+4	13	
5	Roots FC	10	3	2	5	7	12	−5	11	
6	Gokulam Kerala	10	1	3	6	6	22	−16	6	

Source: RFDL

==== Top scorers ====
Rank	Player	Club	Goals
1	Abith KB	Muthoot FA	10
2	Sreekuttan MS	Kerala Blasters	6
3	Lalfamkima	Sreenidi Deccan	4
3	Yohann Victor Britto	Roots FC	4
3	Crispin C Cleetus	Kickstart	4

=== NorthEast region ===
Pos	Team	Pld	W	D	L	GF	GA	GD	Pts	Qualification
1	NorthEast United	10	7	2	1	32	9	+23	23	Advance to National group stage
2	Classic FA	10	7	1	2	33	11	+22	22	Advance to National group stage
3	Jamshedpur	10	5	1	4	23	15	+8	16	Advance to National group stage
4	Aizawl	10	3	3	4	12	17	−5	12	
5	Mizoram YFF	10	2	1	7	14	35	−21	7	
6	Shillong Lajong	10	2	0	8	12	39	−27	6	

Source: RFDL

==== Top scorers ====
Rank	Player	Club	Goals
1	Laishram Danny Meitei	NorthEast United	10
2	Aditya Kalloli	NorthEast United	7
2	Ningthoujam Remson Singh	Jamshedpur	7
2	Md Arbash	Classic FA	7
5	Lawmsangzuala	Jamshedpur	6

=== Kolkata–North region ===
Pos	Team	Pld	W	D	L	GF	GA	GD	Pts	Qualification
1	East Bengal	8	6	1	1	19	8	+11	19	Advance to National group stage
2	Mohun Bagan	8	4	2	2	12	8	+4	14	Advance to National group stage
3	Diamond Harbour	8	3	1	4	13	16	−3	10	Advance to National group stage
4	Sudeva Delhi	8	2	2	4	10	14	−4	8	
5	Garhwal Heroes	8	1	2	5	11	19	−8	5	

Source: RFDL

==== Top scorers ====
Rank	Player	Club	Goals
1	Benjamin Lalnunpuia	Diamond Harbour	5
2	Akash Hemram	Diamond Harbour	4
3	Vian Vinay Murgod	Mohun Bagan SG	3
4	Thumsol Tongsin	Mohun Bagan SG	2
4	Surajit Dutta	East Bengal	2
4	Iashanbok Buhphang	Garwhal Heroes	2
4	Pasang Dorjee Tamang	Mohun Bagan SG	2

== National group stage ==
=== Group A ===
Pos	Team	Pld	W	D	L	GF	GA	GD	Pts	Qualification	JAM	GOA	KIC	NEU	DHB	EAB
1	Jamshedpur	5	3	1	1	13	7	+6	10	Advance to National Championship	—	—	—	5–2	1–1	3–0
2	FC Goa	5	3	0	2	7	4	+3	9	Advance to National Championship	4–0	—	2–0	0–1	0–3	1–0
3	Kickstart FC	5	3	0	2	5	6	−1	9		0–4	—	—	1–0	3–0	—
4	NorthEast United	5	2	1	2	5	6	−1	7		—	—	—	—	—	—
5	Diamond Harbour	5	1	2	2	4	6	−2	5		—	—	—	0–0	—	0–2
6	East Bengal	5	1	0	4	2	7	−5	3		—	—	0–1	0–2	—	—

Source: RFDL

==== Top scorers ====
Rank	Player	Club	Goals
1	Bivan Jyoti Laskar	Jamshedpur	5
2	Likson Rebelo	FC Goa	3
3	Laishram Danny Meitei	NorthEast United	2
3	Akash Hemram	Diamond Harbour	2
3	Vellington Fernandes	FC Goa	2

=== Group B ===
Pos	Team	Pld	W	D	L	GF	GA	GD	Pts	Qualification	CFA	MBG	MFA	DEM	SDE	MCI
1	Classic FA	5	3	1	1	6	3	+3	10	Advance to National Championship	—	0–0	0–1	2–0	—	—
2	Mohun Bagan SG	5	3	1	1	6	4	+2	10	Advance to National Championship	—	—	2–1	0–2	—	—
3	Muthoot FA	5	3	0	2	9	4	+5	9		—	—	—	3–1	0–1	—
4	Dempo SC	5	2	1	2	7	6	+1	7		—	—	—	—	—	—
5	Sreenidi Deccan	5	1	2	2	6	8	−2	5		2–3	0–2	—	1–1	—	—
6	Mumbai City	5	0	1	4	3	12	−9	1		0–1	1–2	0–4	0–3	2–2	—

Source: RFDL

==== Top scorers ====
Rank	Player	Club	Goals
1	Febil K	Muthoot FA	3
1	Bharat Lairenjam	Classic FA	3
3	Salgeo Dias	Dempo	2
3	Leimapokpam Sibajit Singh	Mohun Bagan SG	2
3	Levis Zangminlun	Sreenidi Deccan	2

== National Championship ==
=== Qualification ===
Club	Qualified as
Jamshedpur	Group A champions
Classic FA	Group B champions
FC Goa	Group A runners-up
Mohun Bagan SG	Group B runners-up

- Top 3 teams from this stage will qualify for Next Gen Cup. As Classic FA backed out of Next Gen Cup due to scheduling challenges, Jamshedpur replaced them in Next Gen Cup.

=== Bracket ===
All matches to be played at Reliance Corporate Park, Navi Mumbai.

Semifinals
A1	Jamshedpur	1
B2	Mohun Bagan SG	5
B1	Classic FA	3
A2	Goa	0

Final
SF1	Mohun Bagan SG	3
SF2	Classic FA	0
Third place
SF1	Jamshedpur	0
SF2	Goa	1

=== Semi-finals ===
10 April 2025
08:00 IST
Semi Final 1

Jamshedpur	1–5	Mohun Bagan SG
Laskar 13'	Report	Sahil 18'; Taison 23'; Serto 45', 72'; Munda 78'

Reliance Corporate Park, Navi Mumbai, India
Attendance: 225

10 April 2025
18:00 IST
Semi Final 2

Classic FA	3–0	Goa
Thangjam 30'; Arbash 38'; Rishi 78'	Report

Reliance Corporate Park, Navi Mumbai, India
Attendance: 300

=== 3rd place match ===
14 April 2025
08:00 IST
3rd Place

Jamshedpur	0–1	Goa
	Report	Gaunkar 15'

Reliance Corporate Park, Navi Mumbai, India
Attendance: 200

=== Final ===
14 April 2025
18:00 IST
Final

Mohun Bagan SG	3–0	Classic FA
Tamang 8', 23', 52'	Report

Reliance Corporate Park, Navi Mumbai, India
Attendance: 130

== See also ==
- 2024–25 Indian Youth League
