= 2025–26 Mohun Bagan SG Youth and Academy season =

Indian youth football team season

Mohun Bagan Youth
- Nickname: The Mariners
- Short name: MBSG
- Founded: 2002; 24 years ago
- Ground: Mohun Bagan Ground
- Capacity: 22,000
- Owners: RPSG Mohun Bagan Pvt. Ltd.: RPSG Group (80%); Mohun Bagan Football Club (India) Pvt. Ltd. (20%)
- Chairman: Sanjiv Goenka
- Head coach: Deggie Cardozo (Reserves)
- League: CFL Premier Division (Reserves); RF Development League; AIFF Elite League
Home colours	Away colours

Mohun Bagan SG Under-23s, Under-21s, Under-17s, Under-15s, and Under-13s generally known as Mohun Bagan, is the reserve team and youth system of the Indian Super League side Mohun Bagan SG. The U-21 and the reserve teams are generally referred to as last stage of progression into the senior squad. The reserve team participates in the Calcutta Football League. Youth teams also participate in the RF Development League and the AIFF Elite League. The concept for a youth team was conceived and materialised under the leadership of Balai Das Chattopadhyay in 1944.

== Overview ==
Competition	First match (round)	Latest match (round)	Final position
Calcutta Football League	30 June 2025; Group stage	30 August 2025; Round 12	6/12 Group stage
RFDL	16 January; Regional Group Stage	23 March; National Group Stage	4th of 6 in National Group
AIFF U18 League	17 November; Zonal Group stage	21 April 2026; National Group Stage	3rd of 4 in National Group
AIFF Junior League (U16)	13 January; Zonal Group Stage	8 May; National Group Stage	3rd of 4 in National Group
AIFF Sub Junior League (U14)	15 January; Zonal Group Stage	9 May; Quarter Finals	Quarter Finals

=== Reserves,U18 (Deggie Cardozo) ===
Competition	Record							
Competition	Pld	W	D	L	GF	GA	GD	Win %
RFDL	20	9	6	5	35	14	+21	45.00
Calcutta Football League	10	5	2	3	21	11	+10	50.00
U-18 League	14	8	5	1	35	11	+24	57.14
Total	44	22	13	9	91	36	+55	50.00

Last updated: 21 April 2026
Source: Competitions

- Includes Only Reserves,U18 (Under Deggie Cardozo)

=== U18 (Biswajit Ghoshal) ===
Competition	Record							
Competition	Pld	W	D	L	GF	GA	GD	Win %
U-18 League	2	1	0	1	11	4	+7	50.00
Total	2	1	0	1	11	4	+7	50.00

Last updated: 28 February 2026
Source: Competitions

- Includes Only Reserves,U16 (Under Biswajit Ghoshal), Assistant Coach of Deggie Cardozo

=== U16 (Tanumoy Basu & Chanchal Saha) ===
Competition	Record							
Competition	Pld	W	D	L	GF	GA	GD	Win %
RFYS	6	5	1	0	20	3	+17	83.33
AIFF u16 Junior League	14	10	2	2	43	12	+31	71.43
Total	20	15	3	2	63	15	+48	75.00

Last updated: 8 May 2026
Source: Competitions

- Includes Only U16 (Under Tanumoy Basu & Chanchal Saha)

=== U14 (Pratam Bahadur Thapa) ===
Competition	Record							
Competition	Pld	W	D	L	GF	GA	GD	Win %
AIFF u14 Sub Junior League	17	12	3	2	63	8	+55	70.59
Total	17	12	3	2	63	8	+55	70.59

Last updated: 9 May 2026
Source: Competitions

- Includes Only U14 (Under Pratam Bahadur Thapa)

== U21 Reserves (RFDL) ==
The team participated in the 2026 Reliance Foundation Development League as the defending champions.
In the Regional Round they finished 2nd with four wins and a loss, and qualified for the Zonals.
In the zonal round they finished 3rd with two wins, two draws and a loss against their arch rivals East Bengal FC.
They qualified for the National Round and finished 4th in the group, as a result they failed to qualify for the National Championship.

They played a total of 20 matches and finished the tournament with 9 wins, 6 draws and 5 losses, Suhail Ahmad Bhat scored the most goals (9) for Mohun Bagan this season, and Bagan goal keeper Priyansh Dubey won the golden glove award for the second consecutive season.

=== Squad ===
Note: Flags indicate national team as defined under FIFA eligibility rules; some limited exceptions apply. Players may hold more than one non-FIFA nationality.

No.	Pos.	Nation	Player
31	GK	IND	Priyansh Dubey
51	GK	IND	Nandan Roy
91	GK	IND	Aniket Ghosh
3	DF	IND	Lengunhao Koch
4	DF	IND	Sahil Inamdar
20	DF	IND	Sahajid Gazi
22	DF	IND	Aditya Mondal
25	DF	IND	Ngamchinlen Kilong
26	DF	IND	Md Sarfaraz
30	DF	IND	Pallujam Rohan Singh
36	DF	IND	Muhammed Bilal CV
45	DF	IND	Sahil Tamang
53	DF	IND	Leewan Castanha
73	CB	IND	Umer Muhthar KP
77	DF	IND	Thangjam Roshan Singh
96	DF	IND	Pabitra Mandi
17	MF	IND	Lungoulal Kipgen
21	MF	IND	Khaiminlal Khongsai
34	MF	IND	N Remson Singh
39	MF	IND	Punit Thangjam
42	MF	IND	Gurnaj Singh Grewal

No.	Pos.	Nation	Player
44	MF	IND	Nishar
47	MF	IND	Paonam Govin Singh
50	MF	IND	Gogocha Chungkham
55	MF	IND	Yendrembam Rohit Singh
63	MF	IND	Aditya Adhikari
66	MF	IND	Barun Khangembam
74	MF	IND	Sahil Kar
80	MF	IND	Mingma Sherpa
81	MF	IND	Thumsol Tongsin
7	FW	IND	Pasang Tamang
10	FW	IND	Bharat Lairenjam
11	FW	IND	Oinam Donald Singh
75	FW	IND	Rajkumar Lanchenba Singh
43	FW	IND	Shibam Munda
62	FW	IND	Bivan Jyoti Laskar
72	FW	IND	Suhail Ahmad Bhat
75	FW	IND	Rajkumar Lanchenba Singh
99	FW	IND	Prem Hansdak
79	FW	IND	T Pangambam

=== RFDL Youth League ===
==== Regional Qualifiers [East Region] ====
Pos	Team	Pld	W	D	L	GF	GA	GD	Pts	Qualification	EAB	MBSG	DHB	USC	VIC	IFA
1	East Bengal	5	4	0	1	14	2	+12	12 (Note: Head-to-head points: East Bengal 3, Mohun Bagan 0)	Advance to Zonal group stage				0–1	3–1	8–0
2	Mohun Bagan	5	4	0	1	17	2	+15	12	Advance to Zonal group stage	0–2		2–0			1–0
3	Diamond Harbour	5	3	0	2	9	3	+6	9	Advance to Zonal group stage	0–1			1–0	5–0	
4	United SC	5	2	1	2	5	11	−6	7	Advance to Zonal group stage		0–8				
5	Victoria Sporting Club	5	1	0	4	3	16	−13	3			0–6		0–2		
6	IFA Bengal Future Champs	5	0	1	4	2	16	−14	1				0–3	2–2	0–2	

Source: RFDL
Notes:

16 January 2025 1	Mohun Bagan u21	1 – 0	IFA Bengal Future Champs	India
10:30 IST	Yendrembam Rohit Singh 86'	Report		Stadium: Barrackpore Stadium; Attendance: 150; Referee: Dwiptak Chaktraborty; Man of the Match: Nishant Toppoo (IFA Bengal Future Champs)

19 January 2026 2	Victoria Sporting Club	0 – 6	Mohun Bagan u21	India
14:30 IST	Shuva Naskar (yellow card) 32'; Sujay Mondal (yellow card) 54'; Sk Riyajul Islam (yellow card) 90+3'	Report	Thumsol Tongsin 10'; Punit Thangjam 43'; Aditya Adhikari (yellow card) 45', (goal) 72'; Leewan Castanha 55'; Gurnaj Singh (yellow card) 67'; Pasang Dorjee Tamang 70'; Yendrembam Rohit Singh (yellow card) 85', (goal) 90+3' (pen.)	Stadium: Barrackpore Stadium; Attendance: 500; Referee: Suvajit Pramanik; Man of the Match: Pasang Dorjee Tamang (Mohun Bagan)

21 January 2026 3	United Sports Club	0 – 8	Mohun Bagan u21	India
14:30 IST	Lalremruata (yellow card) 55'; Arnab Das (yellow card) 67'; Aman Yadav (yellow card) 90+1'	Report	Pabitra Mandi (yellow card) 6'; Suhail Ahmad Bhat 16', 68' (pen.), 85', 90+3', (yellow card) 45+1'; Pasang Dorjee Tamang 19'; Aditya Adhikari 21'; Mingma Sherpa 42'; Ningthoujam Remson Singh 78'; Sahil Inamdar (yellow card) 86'	Stadium: Barrackpore Stadium; Attendance: 100; Referee: Tarun Kumar Biswas; Man of the Match: Suhail Ahmad Bhat (Mohun Bagan)

23 January 2026 4	Mohun Bagan u21	2 – 0	Diamond Harbour FC	India
11:30 IST	Thumsol Tongsin 10'; Leewan Castanha (yellow card) 26'; Sahil Tamang (yellow card) 32'; Suhail Ahmad Bhat 46'; Priyansh Dubey (yellow card) 50'; Aditya Adhikari (red card) 63'	Report	Sahil Harijan (yellow card) 33'; Chopel Lhendup Bhutia (red card) 63'; Kazi Talal Ibtida (yellow card) 66'	Stadium: Barrackpore Stadium; Attendance: 200; Referee: Rahul Karmakar; Man of the Match: Pallujam Rohan Singh (Mohun Bagan)

25 January 2026 5	Mohun Bagan u21	0 – 2	East Bengal u21	India
14:30 IST	Muhammed Bilal CV (yellow card) 12'; Suhail Ahmad Bhat (yellow card) 45'; Pasang Dorjee Tamang (yellow card) 89'	Report	Irfan Sardar (yellow card) 36'; Sonam Tsewang Lhokham (yellow card) 45'; Laikhuram Ricky Singh 47', 90+4'; Thingujam Mask Khuman (yellow card) 81'; Guite Vanlalpeka (red card) 84'	Stadium: Naihati Stadium; Attendance: 6,856; Referee: Dipu Roy; Man of the Match: Laikhuram Ricky Singh (East Bengal)

==== Zonal Round ====
Pos	Team	Pld	W	D	L	GF	GA	GD	Pts	Qualification	DHB	EAB	MBSG	BMSA	RUFC	USC
1	Diamond Harbour	5	4	1	0	10	2	+8	13	Advance to National group stage		1–0		3–0	3–1	2–0
2	East Bengal	5	4	0	1	11	3	+8	12	Advance to National group stage					1–0	6–2
3	Mohun Bagan	5	2	2	1	8	5	+3	8	Advance to National group stage	1–1	0–1				2–2
4	Bidhannagar Municipal SA	5	2	0	3	3	9	−6	6			0–3	0–2		2–1	
5	Rajasthan United	5	1	0	4	6	9	−3	3				1–3			3–0
6	United SC	5	0	1	4	4	14	−10	1					0–1		

Source: RFDL

29 January 2026 1	Mohun Bagan u21	1 – 1	Diamond Harbour	Kolkata
10:30 IST	Yendrembam Rohit Singh (yellow card) 45+1'; Aditya Adhikari 54'; Suhail Ahmad Bhat (yellow card) 90+6'	Report	Nayan Tudu (yellow card) 11'; Sahil Harijan 42'; Rohit Das (yellow card) 48'	Stadium: Barrackpore Stadium; Attendance: 500; Referee: Dwiptak Chakraborty; Man of the Match: Sahil Harijan (Diamond Harbour FC)

1 February 2026 2	Rajasthan United	1 – 3	Mohun Bagan u21	Kolkata
15:00 IST	Rajkumar Lanchenba Singh 30'	Report	Suhail Ahmad Bhat 4', 20', 63'; Punit Thangjam (yellow card) 76' (yellow-red card) 80'	Stadium: Barrackpore Stadium; Attendance: 670; Referee: Sandip Das; Man of the Match: Suhail Ahmad Bhat (Mohun Bagan)

4 February 2026 3	Bidhannagar Municipal SA	0 – 2	Mohun Bagan u21	Kolkata
15:00 IST	Gourab Rajbanshi (yellow card) 6'; Sohon Dey (yellow card) 49'; Pritam Biswas (yellow card) 57'; Santanu Naskar (yellow card) 90+3'	Report	Nishar 24'; Md Bilal CV 51'; Pabitra Mandi (yellow card) 82'; Rohan Singh (yellow card) 85'	Stadium: Barrackpore Stadium; Attendance: 40; Referee: Rohan Das Gupta; Man of the Match: Thumsol Tongsin (Mohun Bagan)

7 February 2026 4	Mohun Bagan u21	0 – 1	East Bengal u21	Kolkata
15:00 IST	Thangjam Roshan Singh (yellow card) 11'	Report	Romin Goldar 57'; Robert Thokchom (yellow card) 60'; Lalnuntluanga (yellow card) 68'; Debojit Roy (yellow card) 68'; Ananthu N S (yellow card) 90+2'; Thingujam Mask Khuman (yellow card) 90+6'	Stadium: Barrackpore Stadium; Attendance: 3129; Referee: Debabrata Naskar; Man of the Match: Romin Goldar (East Bengal)

10 February 2026 5	Mohun Bagan u21	2 – 2	United SC	Kolkata
10:30 IST	Bharat Lairenjam 34'; Bivan Jyoti Laskar 45+2'	Report	Ronaldo Murmu 21' , (yellow card) 35'; Klalruatfela (yellow card) 60'; Rahul Rai 89'	Stadium: Barrackpore Stadium; Attendance: 251; Referee: Suvankar Das; Man of the Match: Bharat Lairenjam (Mohun Bagan)

==== National Round ====
Pos	Team	Pld	W	D	L	GF	GA	GD	Pts	Qualification	BFC	FCG	SDFC	MBG	DEC	DHB
1	Bengaluru FC	10	5	4	1	17	8	+9	19	Advance to National Championship		1–1	0–2	0–0	6–2	1–1
2	Goa	10	4	2	4	10	11	−1	14	Advance to National Championship	0–2		1–0	1–0	1–3	1–3
3	Sudeva Delhi FC	10	4	2	4	13	16	−3	14		0–3	0–0		3–2	1–3	1–1
4	Mohun Bagan	10	3	4	3	10	7	+3	13		0–1	1–0	2–0		2–2	0–0
5	Sreenidi Deccan	10	3	3	4	21	23	−2	12		2–2	0–2	2–3	0–3		4–0
6	Diamond Harbour	10	1	5	4	11	17	−6	8		0–1	1–3	2–3	0–0	3–3	

Source: RFDL

24 February 2026 1	Bengaluru	0 – 0	Mohun Bagan u21	Shillong, India
15:00 IST	Ahongshangbam Samson (yellow card) 12'; Md Arbash (yellow card) 58'	Report	Thumsol Tongsin (yellow card) 4'; Rajkumar Lanchenba (yellow card) 38'; Gurnaj Singh Grewal (yellow card) 90+6'	Stadium: SSA Stadium, Shillong; Attendance: 100; Referee: Manish Vashisht; Man of the Match: Cyrus Abhilash (Bengaluru FC)

27 February 2026 2	Mohun Bagan u21	0 – 0	Diamon Harbour	Shillong, India
11:30 IST		Report	Rajibul Halder (yellow card) 61'; Arnab Ghosh (yellow card) 90+5'	Stadium: MFA Ground; Attendance: 50; Referee: Abdul Mazid CHoudhury; Man of the Match: Oinam Donald Singh (Mohun Bagan)

2 March 2026 3	Mohun Bagan u21	1 – 0	FC Goa	Shillong, India
08:00 IST	Oinam Donald Singh (yellow card) 16'; Bivan Jyoti Laskar 86'	Report	Konsam Akash Singh (yellow card) 64'	Stadium: SSA Stadium; Attendance: 50; Referee: Manish Vashisht; Man of the Match: Bivan Jyoti Laskar (Mohun Bagan)

5 March 2026 4	Mohun Bagan u21	2 – 2	Sreenidi Deccan	Shillong, India
15:00 IST	Muhammed Bilal CV (yellow card) 15'; Oinam Donald Singh 45+3', 51'; Priyansh Dubey (red card) 86'	Report	Lamgunlal Kipgen (yellow card) 22'; R Lawmnasangzuala (yellow card) 26' , (goal) 86' (pen.); Dinesh Singh 68'	Stadium: SSA Stadium; Attendance: 100; Referee: Rajkumar Angousana Singh; Man of the Match: Oinam Donald Singh (Mohun Bagan)

8 March 2026 5	Sudeva Delhi	3 – 2	Mohun Bagan u21	Shillong, India
08:00 IST	Sankhil Tuishang 29'; Wahengbam Legend Singh (yellow card) 45+1'; Md Ejaj Ahamad 45+3', 76' (pen.); Mayengbam Lamjingba (yellow card) 48'; Dishan Shabir (yellow card) 90+3'	Report	Yendrembam Rohit Singh 12'; Suhail 45'; Subal Tudu (yellow card) 56'	Stadium: MFA Ground; Attendance: 30; Referee: Abdul Mazid Chowdhury; Man of the Match: Md Ejaj Ahamad (Sudeva Delhi)

11 March 2026 6	FC Goa	1 – 0	Mohun Bagan u21	Shillong, India
15:00 IST	Kavya Sunil Katkar 48', (yellow card) 48'; Malsawmtluanga (yellow card) 54'	Report		Stadium: SSA Stadium; Attendance: 50; Referee: Rajkumar Angousana Singh; Man of the Match: Lionel Daryl Rymmei (FC Goa)

14 March 2026 7	Diamond Harbour	0 – 0	Mohun Bagan u21	Shillong, India
15:00 IST	Amzard Khan (yellow card) 25'; Mohd Arbaz (yellow card) 86'; Arnab Ghosh (yellow card) 90+6'	Report	Thumsol Tongsin (yellow card) 18'; Muhammed Bilal CV (yellow card) 70'	Stadium: MFA Ground; Attendance: 75; Referee: Manish Vashisht; Man of the Match: Mohd Arbaz (Diamond Harbour)

17 March 2026 8	Mohun Bagan u21	0 – 1	Bengaluru	Shillong, India
11:30 IST	Sahajid Gazi (yellow card) 14'	Report	Vumlenlal Hangshing 28'; Ahongshangbam Samson (yellow card) 61'; Adil (yellow card) 89'; Yaipharemba Chingakham (yellow card) 90+7'	Stadium: SSA Stadium; Attendance: 30; Referee: Rajkumar Angousana Singh; Man of the Match: Vumlenlal Hangshing (Bengaluru FC)

20 March 2026 9	Sreenidi Deccan	0 – 3	Mohun Bagan u21	Shillong, India
11:30 IST	Jaydev Sharma (yellow card) 2'	Report	Bivan Jyoti Laskar 22'; Bharat Lairenjam 25'; Rohit Singh 65'; Thangjam Roshan Singh (yellow card) 88'	Stadium: SSA Stadium; Attendance: 20; Referee: Manish Vashisht; Man of the Match: Bivan Jyoti Laskar (Mohun Bagan)

23 March 2026 10	Mohun Bagan u21	2 – 0	Sudeva Delhi	Shillong, India
08:00 IST	Bivan Jyoti Laskar 21'; Gogocha Chungkham 59'	Report	Jajo Prashan (yellow card) 28'; Rajeshwor Singh (yellow card) 41'	Stadium: SSA Stadium; Attendance: 50; Referee: Abdul Mazid Chowdhury; Man of the Match: Aditya Adhikari (Mohun Bagan)

=== Appearances ===
Players with no appearances are not included in the list.

As of 23 March 2026

Appearances for Mohun Bagan in 2025–26 season
No.	Pos.	Nat.	Name	Regional		Zonal		National		Total	
No.	Pos.	Nat.	Name	Apps	Starts	Apps	Starts	Apps	Starts	Apps	Starts
Goalkeepers
31	GK	(India)	Priyansh Dubey	5	5	4	4	8	8	17	17
91	GK	(India)	Aniket Ghosh	—		1	1	3	2	4	3
Defenders
3	DF	(India)	Lengunhao Koch	1	0	1	0	4	3	6	3
4	DF	(India)	Sahil Inamdar	1	0	—		—		1	0
20	DF	(India)	Sahajit Gazi	—		—		9	7	9	7
30	DF	(India)	Pallujam Rohan Singh	5	5	5	5	8	8	18	18
36	DF	(India)	Muhammad Bilal CV	5	5	5	5	9	9	19	19
45	DF	(India)	Sahil Tamang	3	1	2	1	1	0	6	2
53	DF	(India)	Leewan Casthana	5	5	4	2	6	5	15	12
71	DF	(India)	Subal Tudu	—		5	5	8	4	13	9
77	DF	(India)	Thangjam Roshan Singh	5	5	3	3	7	6	15	14
96	DF	(India)	Pabitra Mandi	2	1	3	1	2	0	7	2
Midfielders
17	MF	(India)	Lungoulal Kipgen	—		2	0	—		2	0
34	MF	(India)	Ningthoujam Remson Singh	3	0	1	0	2	0	6	0
39	MF	(India)	Punit Thangjam	4	1	4	0	4	1	12	2
42	MF	(India)	Gurnaj Singh Grewal	5	5	5	4	9	7	19	16
44	MF	(India)	Nishar	2	0	2	2	—		4	2
47	MF	(India)	Paonav Govin Singh	3	3	2	2	—		5	5
50	MF	(India)	Gogocha Chungkham	—		—		5	2	5	2
55	MF	(India)	Yendrembam Rohit Singh	4	0	3	2	9	7	16	9
63	MF	(India)	Aditya Adhikari	4	4	5	4	10	7	19	15
66	MF	(India)	Barun Khangembam	3	0	1	0	1	0	5	0
74	MF	(India)	Sahil Kar	—		1	0	—		1	0
80	MF	(India)	Mingma Sherpa	5	5	5	3	4	1	14	9
81	MF	(India)	Thumsol Tongsin	5	5	3	3	10	10	18	18
Forwards
7	FW	(India)	Pasang Dorjee Tamang	4	1	3	3	6	3	13	7
10	FW	(India)	Bharat Lairenjam	—		1	1	4	3	5	4
11	FW	(India)	Oinam Donald Singh	1	1	3	0	8	6	12	7
43	FW	(India)	Shibam Munda	2	1	—		4	1	6	2
62	FW	(India)	Bivan Jyoti Laskar	—		2	1	10	3	12	4
72	FW	(India)	Suhail Ahmad Bhat	3	3	3	3	2	2	8	8
75	FW	(India)	Rajkumar Lanchenba	—		—		6	4	6	4
79	FW	(India)	Taibangnganba Pangambam	—		1	0	—		1	0

=== Goals ===
As of 23 March 2026

Rank	No.	Nat.	Name	Regional	Zonal	National	Total
1	72	(India)	Suhail Ahmad Bhat	5	3	1	9
2	55	(India)	Yendrembam Rohit Singh	2	0	2	4
2	62	(India)	Bivan Jyoti Laskar	0	1	3	4
3	63	(India)	Aditya Adhikari	2	1	0	3
4	7	(India)	Pasang Dorjee Tamang	2	0	0	2
4	10	(India)	Bharat Lairenjam	0	1	1	2
4	11	(India)	Oinam Donald Singh	0	0	2	2
4	81	(India)	Thumsol Tongsin	2	0	0	2
5	34	(India)	Remson Singh	1	0	0	1
5	36	(India)	Muhammad Bilal CV	0	1	0	1
5	39	(India)	Punit Thangjam	1	0	0	1
5	44	(India)	Nishar	0	1	0	1
5	50	(India)	Gogocha Chungkham	0	0	1	1
5	53	(India)	Leewan Castanha	1	0	0	1
5	80	(India)	Mingma Sherpa	1	0	0	1
Total				17	8	10	35

=== Cleansheets ===
As of 23 March 2026

Rank	No.	Nat.	Name	Regional	Zonal	National	Total
1	31	(India)	Priyansh Dubey	4	1	6	11
Total				4	1	6	11

=== Disciplinary Record ===
As of 23 March 2026

No.	Nat.	Name	Regional			Zonal			National			Total		
No.	Nat.	Name	Booked	(yellow card) (yellow-red card)	Sent off (straight red)	Booked	(yellow card) (yellow-red card)	Sent off (straight red)	Booked	(yellow card) (yellow-red card)	Sent off (straight red)	Booked	(yellow card) (yellow-red card)	Sent off (straight red)
36	(India)	Muhammad Bilal CV	1	0	0	—			2	0	0	3	0	0
72	(India)	Suhail Ahmad Bhat	2	0	0	1	0	0	—			3	0	0
31	(India)	Priyash Dubey	1	0	0	—			0	0	1	1	0	1
63	(India)	Aditya Adhikari	1	0	1	—			—			1	0	1
42	(India)	Gurnaj Singh Grewal	1	0	0	—			1	0	0	2	0	0
55	(India)	Yendrembam Rohit Singh	1	0	0	1	0	0	—			2	0	0
77	(India)	Thangjam Roshan Singh	—			1	0	0	1	0	0	2	0	0
81	(India)	Thumsol Tongsin	—			—			2	0	0	2	0	0
96	(India)	Pabitra Mandi	1	0	0	1	0	0	—			2	0	0
39	(India)	Punit Thangjam	—			0	1	0	—			0	1	0
4	(India)	Sahil Inamdar	1	0	0	—			—			1	0	0
7	(India)	Pasang Dorjee Tamang	1	0	0	—			—			1	0	0
11	(India)	Oinam Donald Singh	—			—			1	0	0	1	0	0
20	(India)	Sahajid Gazi	—			—			1	0	0	1	0	0
30	(India)	Pallujam Rohan Singh	—			1	0	0	—			1	0	0
45	(India)	Sahil Tamang	1	0	0	—			—			1	0	0
53	(India)	Leewan Castanha	1	0	0	—			—			1	0	0
71	(India)	Subal Tudu	—			—			1	0	0	1	0	0
75	(India)	Rajkumar Lanchenba	—			—			1	0	0	1	0	0
Total			12	0	1	5	1	0	10	0	1	27	1	2

== U18 ==
The team participated in the sixteenth season of the Indian Youth League which marked a return to the under-18 category.

=== Squad ===
Note: Flags indicate national team as defined under FIFA eligibility rules; some limited exceptions apply. Players may hold more than one non-FIFA nationality.

No.	Pos.	Nation	Player
1	GK	IND	Rohit
31	GK	IND	Suva Barai
51	GK	IND	Nandan Roy
4	DF	IND	Achouba Huidrom
5	DF	IND	Abhishek Kumar Mondal
20	DF	IND	Khundongbam Shatish Singh
22	DF	IND	Md Aziz Dorjee
26	DF	IND	Mahammad Sarfaraz
32	DF	IND	Aditya Mondal
44	DF	IND	Jayanta Mondal
66	DF	IND	Md Musharaf
8	MF	IND	Paogunthang Stephen Doungel
14	MF	IND	Thounaojam Jetlee Singh
16	MF	IND	Sabyasachi Dhar

No.	Pos.	Nation	Player
17	MF	IND	Lungoulal Kipgen
19	MF	IND	Monu Rajbanshi
21	MF	IND	Khaiminlal Khongsai
27	MF	IND	Md Jeheruddin
33	MF	IND	Rintu Malik
40	MF	IND	Rajdwip Khatrapal
41	MF	IND	Rihan Abdul Azeez
77	MF	IND	Abrar Ali Baba
88	MF	IND	Vineet Rajbanshi
7	FW	IND	Prem Hansdak
10	FW	IND	Bobby Singh
11	FW	IND	Thangngasiang Haokip
99	FW	IND	Bharat Lairenjam

=== Group Stage ===
Pos	Team	Pld	W	D	L	GF	GA	GD	Pts	EBFC	MBSG	USC	DHFC	SKM	MSC	AIFF	KUCT
1	East Bengal u18	10	8	1	1	24	5	+19	25		2–0	3–1	3–0	4–0	4–1	~~18 Mar~~	~~5-0~~
2	Mohun Bagan u18	10	6	2	2	32	10	+22	20	1–1		2–3	0–0	4–2	7–1	~~2-0~~	~~3 Mar~~
3	United SC	10	6	2	2	13	7	+6	20	2–0	0–1		2–0	1–1	1–0	~~4-2~~	~~15 Feb~~
4	Diamond Harbour	10	2	4	4	8	16	−8	10	0–2	0–5	0–0		1–1	3–1	~~1-1~~	~~0-0~~
5	SKM Sports Foundation	10	1	3	6	9	21	−12	6	0–2	0–3	0–1	1–3		1–1	~~3-0~~	~~1-0~~
6	Mohammedan SC	10	0	2	8	7	34	−27	2	0–3	1–9	2–0	1–1	1–3		~~0-3~~	~~15 Dec~~
7	AIFF Academy	0	0	0	0	0	0	0	0	~~1-0~~	~~1-2~~	~~1-0~~	~~1-1~~	~~2-2~~	~~4-1~~		~~4-0~~
8	Keshab Uma Charitable Trust FA	0	0	0	0	0	0	0	0	~~1-2~~	~~0-6~~	~~1-3~~	~~25 Feb~~	~~1-1~~	~~7 Feb~~	~~2-1~~	

Updated to match(es) played on 7 March. Source: AIFF

==== Group H ====
17 November 2025 1	Mohun Bagan u18	1 – 1	East Bengal u18	Kolkata, India
10:30 IST	Md Sarfaraz (yellow card) 21'; Jetlee Singh (yellow card) 57'; Prem Hansdak 58', (yellow card) 76'; Khaiminlal Khongsai (yellow card) 71'	AIFF	Saurav Pradhan (yellow card) 42'; Pritam Gain 45+2' (pen.); Samuel Haokip (yellow card) 63'; Pradip Mishra (yellow card) 73'; Gingoungam Hmangte (yellow card) 76'	Stadium: Mohun Bagan Ground; Attendance: 100; Referee: Dipu Roy

5 December 2025 3	Mohun Bagan u18	0 – 0	Diamond Harbour u18	Kolkata, India
10:30 IST	Lungoulal Kipgen (yellow card) 47'	Report	Surya Sarkar (yellow card) 25'	Stadium: Mohun Bagan Ground; Attendance: 270; Referee: Shovan Roy; Man of the Match: Vivek Yadav; Diamond Harbour

14 December 2025 4	SKM Sports Foundation	0 – 3	Mohun Bagan u18	Kalna, India
14:00 IST	Sudeb Murmu (yellow card) 5'; Jayanta Tudu (yellow card) 58'	Report	Prem Hansdak 24', 65'; Monu Rajbanshi 39'; Khaiminlal Khongsai (yellow card) 40'	Stadium: Aghornath Ground; Attendance: 2,000; Referee: Sarnendu Bagchi; Man of the Match: Prem Hansdak (Mohun Bagan)

22 December 2025 5	Mohun Bagan u18	2 – 0	AIFF Academy	Kolkata, India
10:30 IST	Jayanta Mondal 35'; Aditya Mondal (yellow card) 41'; Thangngaisang Haokip 43'; Bobby Singh (yellow card) 90+5'	Report	Priyanshu Khaskel (yellow card) 9'; Luchingba Laikhuram (yellow card) 90+5'	Stadium: Mohun Bagan Ground; Attendance: 200; Referee: Subhajit Dhara

29 December 2025 6	United SC u18	0 – 1	Mohun Bagan u18	Kalyani, India
: IST		Report	Aditya Mondal 90+1'	Stadium: Kalyani Stadium; Attendance: 150; Referee: Shovan Roy; Man of the Match: Nandan Roy

6 January 2026 7	Keshab Uma Charitable Trust FA	0 – 6	Mohun Bagan u18	Gangadharpur, India
: IST	Rupam Das (yellow card) 19'; Utsab Mandal (yellow card) 45+1'	Report	Lungoulal Kipgen 22', 54'; Monu Rajbanshi 27'; Khaiminlal Khongsai 39'; Bharat Lairenjam 45+3' (pen.); Prem Hansdak 90'	Stadium: Gangadharpur B.Ed College Ground; Attendance: 400; Referee: Avisekh Saha

15 January 2026 8	East Bengal u18	2 – 0	Mohun Bagan u18	Kolkata, India
14:00 IST	Raj Gazi (yellow card) 39'; Chesam Yahiya 56'; Pradip Mishra (yellow card) 74'; Pritam Gain 88'	Report	Lungoulal Kipgen (red card) 19'; Aditya Mondal (yellow card) 45'; Mahammad Sarfaraz (yellow card) 45+1'	Stadium: East Bengal Ground; Attendance: 2,154; Referee: Tanumoy Sarkar; Man of the Match: Chesam Yahiya (East Bengal)

22 January 2026 9	Mohun Bagan u18	7 – 1	Mohammedan SC u18	Kolkata, India
10:30 IST	Md Musharaf 11'; Bharat Lairenjam 22', 26', 89', 90+3'; Prem Hansdak 33'; Thounaojam Jetlee Singh 77'	Report	Sekh Kaiub 32'	Stadium: Mohun Bagan Ground; Attendance: 358; Referee: Dipu Roy; Man of the Match: Bharat Lairenjam (Mohun Bagan)

30 January 2026 10	Diamond Harbour u18	0 – 5	Mohun Bagan u18	Kolkata, India
14:00 IST	Shuva Mahali (yellow card) 44'; Amir Sohel Molla (yellow card) 78'	Report	Bharat Lairenjam 37', 52'; Prem Hansdak 41'; Khaiminlal Khongsai 42'; Thangngaisang Haokip 87'	Stadium: Bidhannagar; Attendance: 50; Referee: Sandip Das; Man of the Match: Khaiminlal Khongsai (Mohun Bagan)

8 February 2026 11	Mohun Bagan u18	4 – 2	SKM Sports Foundation	Kolkata, India
10:30 IST	Thangngaisang Haokip 13'; Prem Hansdak 23', 51'; Vineet Rajbanshi (yellow card) 83'; Malsawmtluanga 90+4'	Report	Ajay Tudu 45+2'; Shyam Marandi 89'	Stadium: Mohun Bagan Ground; Attendance: 100; Referee: Dwiptak Chakraborty; Man of the Match: Prem Hansdak (Mohun Bagan)

15 February 2026 12	AIFF Academy	1 – 2	Mohun Bagan u18	Kolkata, India
15:00 IST	Aheibam Ronandev 7'; Thiyam Famous (yellow card) 35'; Luchingba Laikhuram (yellow card) 48'	Report	Lungoulal Kipgen 45+2'; Abrar Ali 72'; Khaiminlal Khongsai (yellow card) 73'; Bharat Lairenjam (yellow card) 85'	Stadium: Aditya School of Sports, Kadambagach; Attendance: 400; Referee: Shovan Roy; Man of the Match: Abrar Ali (Mohun Bagan)

24 February 2026 13	Mohun Bagan u18	2 – 3	United SC u18	Kolkata, India
10:30 IST	Rajdwip Khatrapal (yellow card) 40'; Prem Hansdak 57', 71'	Report	Sahil Sk (yellow card) 26'; Roushan Kumar 31', 90+4'; Pradip Bag (yellow card) 48'; Md Miraj Hasan 72'; Sudipta Bera (yellow card) 77'	Stadium: Mohun Bagan Ground; Attendance: 200; Referee: Suvajit Pramanik; Man of the Match: Roushan Kumar (United SC)

~~24 November 2025~~; 28 February 2026 2	Mohammedan SC u18	1 – 9	Mohun Bagan u18	Kolkata, India
14:00 IST	Debadrita Roy (yellow card) 27'; Debashish Roy 37'	Report	Prem Hansdak 5'; Lungoulal Kipgen 10', 84'; Khaiminlal Khongsai (yellow card) 43'; Abrar Ali Baba 50', 53', 65' (pen.), 70'; Mahammad Sarfaraz 62'; Thangngaisang Haokip 79'; Bobby Singh (yellow card) 90+2'	Stadium: Mohammedan Sporting Ground; Attendance: 100; Referee: Shovan Roy; Man of the Match: Abrar Ali Baba (Mohun Bagan)

3 March 2026 14	Mohun Bagan u18	v	Keshab Uma Charitable Trust FA	Kolkata, India
: IST				Stadium: Mohun Bagan Ground

=== National Group ===
Pos	Team	Pld	W	D	L	GF	GA	GD	Pts	JFC	CFA	MBSG	GKFC
1	Jamshedpur	3	1	2	0	6	5	+1	5		2–2	2–2	2–1
2	Classic FA	3	1	2	0	4	3	+1	5			1–1	1–0
3	Mohun Bagan	3	0	3	0	4	4	0	3				1–1
4	Gokulam Kerala	3	0	1	2	2	4	−2	1				

Source: AIFF u18

17 April 2026 1	Mohun Bagan u18	1 – 1	Gokulam Kerala u18	Mahilpur, India
16:00 IST	Aditya Mondal (yellow card) 13'; Bharat Lairenjam 53'	Report	Sheril Shaji Thomas 45'; Sreekanth S (yellow card) 47'	Stadium: Mahilpur Football Stadium; Attendance: 50; Referee: Dhanesh Sah; Man of the Match: Sheril Shaji Thomas (Gokulam Kerala FC)

19 April 2026 2	Classic Football Academy	1 – 1	Mohun Bagan u18	Mahilpur, India
16:00 IST	Langamba Singh (yellow card) 45+4'; Maisongthonbou Thiumai (yellow card) 52'; Bishorjit Singh 90'	Report	Bharat Lairenjam 88'	Stadium: Ramsar Sahib Sports Stadium; Man of the Match: Bishorjit Singh (Classic FA)

21 April 2026 3	Mohun Bagan u18	2 – 2	Jamshedpur u18	Mahilpur, India
07:30 IST	Lungoulal Kipgen (yellow card) 32' (yellow-red card) 90'; Khaiminlal Khongsai 56'; Md Sarfaraz 85'; Abrar Ali Baba (yellow card) 90+3'	Report	Mars Ningthoujam 2'; Gopal Munda 56'; Rashithoi Meetei (yellow card) 70'; Rayan C (yellow card) 90+3'	Stadium: Mahilpur Football Stadium; Attendance: 30; Referee: Sachin Sharma; Man of the Match: Mars Ningthoujam (Jamshedpur FC)

=== Appearances ===
Players with no appearances are not included in the list.

As of 21 April 2026

Appearances for Mohun Bagan in 2025–26 season
No.	Pos.	Nat.	Name	AIFF U18 Zonal		AIFF U18 National		Total	
No.	Pos.	Nat.	Name	Apps	Starts	Apps	Starts	Apps	Starts
Goalkeepers
1	GK	(India)	Rohit	3	3	—		3	3
51	GK	(India)	Nandan Roy	10	10	3	3	13	13
Defenders
4	DF	(India)	Achouba Huidrom	1	0	—		1	0
20	DF	(India)	Khundongbam Satish Singh	13	13	3	3	16	16
22	DF	(India)	Md Aziz Dorjee	10	8	—		10	8
26	DF	(India)	Mahammmad Sarafaraz	12	12	3	3	15	15
32	DF	(India)	Aditya Mondal	12	12	3	3	15	15
44	DF	(India)	Jayanta Mondal	13	13	1	0	14	13
66	DF	(India)	Md Musharaf	1	1	—		1	1
Midfielders
8	MF	(India)	Paogunthang Stephen Doungel	12	9	—		12	9
14	MF	(India)	Jetlee Singh	5	2	—		5	2
16	MF	(India)	Sabyasachi Dhar	1	0	—		1	0
17	MF	(India)	Lungoulal Kipgen	12	12	3	3	15	15
19	MF	(India)	Monu Rajbanshi	12	10	2	0	14	10
21	MF	(India)	Khaiminlal Khongsai	12	12	3	3	15	15
27	MF	(India)	Md Jeheruddin	5	0	3	1	8	1
33	MF	(India)	Rintu Malik	3	0	—		3	0
40	MF	(India)	Rajdwip Khatrapal	10	4	3	3	13	7
72	MF	(India)	Malswamtluanga	3	0	3	3	6	3
77	MF	(India)	Abrar Ali	11	10	3	3	14	13
81	MF	(India)	Sanju Sikdar	1	0	—		1	0
88	MF	(India)	Vineet Rajbanshi	1	0	—		1	0
Forwards
7	LW	(India)	Prem Hansdak	13	10	2	2	15	12
10	LW	(India)	Bobby Singh	8	0	3	0	11	0
11	LW	(India)	Thangngasiang Haokip	12	1	2	0	14	1
99	LW	(India)	Bharat Lairenjam	12	10	3	3	15	13

=== Goals ===
As of 21 April 2026

Rank	No.	Nat.	Name	AIFF U18 Zonal	AIFF U18 National	Total
1	7	(India)	Prem Hansdak	11	0	11
2	99	(India)	Bharat Lairenjam	7	2	9
3	17	(India)	Lungoulal Kipgen	5	0	5
3	77	(India)	Abrar Ali	5	0	5
4	11	(India)	Thangngaisang Haokip	4	0	4
5	21	(India)	Khaiminlal Khongsai	2	1	3
6	19	(India)	Monu Rajbanshi	2	0	2
6	26	(India)	Mahammad Sarfaraz	1	1	2
7	14	(India)	Jetlee Singh	1	0	1
7	32	(India)	Aditya Mondal	1	0	1
7	44	(India)	Jayanta Mondal	1	0	1
7	66	(India)	Md Musharaf	1	0	1
7	72	(India)	Malsawmtluanga	1	0	1
Total				42	4	46

=== Cleansheets ===
As of 21 April 2026

Rank	No.	Nat.	Name	AIFF U18 Zonal	AIFF U18 National	Total
1	51	(India)	Nandan Roy	6	0	6
Total				6	0	6

=== Disciplinary Record ===
As of 21 April 2026

No.	Nat.	Name	AIFF U18 Zonal			AIFF U18 National			Total		
No.	Nat.	Name	Booked	(yellow card) (yellow-red card)	Sent off (straight red)	Booked	(yellow card) (yellow-red card)	Sent off (straight red)	Booked	(yellow card) (yellow-red card)	Sent off (straight red)
21	(India)	Khaiminlal Khongsai	4	0	0	—			4	0	0
17	(India)	Lungoulal Kipgen	1	0	1	0	0	1	1	0	2
32	(India)	Aditya Mondal	2	0	0	1	0	0	3	0	0
10	(India)	Bobby Singh	2	0	0	—			2	0	0
26	(India)	Mahammad Sarfaraz	2	0	0	—			2	0	0
7	(India)	Prem Hansdak	1	0	0	—			1	0	0
14	(India)	Jetlee Singh	1	0	0	—			1	0	0
40	(India)	Rajdwip Khatrapal	1	0	0	—			1	0	0
77	(India)	Abrar Ali Baba	—			1	0	0	1	0	0
88	(India)	Vineet Rajbanshi	1	0	0	—			1	0	0
99	(India)	Bharat Lairenjam	1	0	0	—			1	0	0
Total			16	0	1	2	0	1	18	0	2

== U16 ==
=== Squad ===
Note: Flags indicate national team as defined under FIFA eligibility rules; some limited exceptions apply. Players may hold more than one non-FIFA nationality.

No.	Pos.	Nation	Player
1	GK	IND	Argho Sarkar
21	GK	IND	Ranjan Malo
31	GK	IND	Rahul Das
4	DF	IND	Avranil Biswas
5	DF	IND	Sandeep Karmakar
14	DF	IND	Jay Soren
16	DF	IND	Sumit Singh
20	DF	IND	Sital Pal
25	DF	IND	Pappu Sarkar
26	DF	IND	Rohit Murmu
2	MF	IND	Suroj Halder
3	MF	IND	Paulbious Tariang
6	MF	IND	Samuel Lalrinzuala
7	MF	IND	Rohit Barman
8	MF	IND	Sayan Halder

No.	Pos.	Nation	Player
11	MF	IND	Prantik Hansda
12	MF	IND	Arko Bhaskar
17	MF	IND	Chowdhury Sahid
18	MF	IND	Abir Moulik
22	MF	IND	Biswajit Debnath
23	MF	IND	Ebenezer Sun
24	MF	IND	Akash SK
30	MF	IND	Manab Marjit
32	MF	IND	Ramjan SK
33	MF	IND	Raj Kerketta
9	FW	IND	Rishi Das
10	FW	IND	Rajdeep Pal
15	FW	IND	Sumit Mandi
19	FW	IND	Abhro Dey
27	FW	IND	Ahon Banerjee

=== Reliance Foundation Youth Sports U17 ===
==== Round 1 ====
Mohun Bagan U16 boys participated in the RFYS U17 Championship 2025-26.They started the 1st Round campaign on 18th December, 2025 with a 4-0 victory against SKM Sports Academy with Malswam Tulunga scoring a hattrick and Prantick scoring the other one. In the second match, points were shared between Bagan and Vivekananda Football Academy in a 1-1 draw. Malswam scored again for Bagan. In the final group game Mohun Bagan Boys' beat Chinsurah Junior Football Coaching Camp - boys' by 6-1 and qualified for the 2nd Round Reliance Foundation Youth Sports U17 Championship as Table Toppers.

Pos	Team	Pld	W	D	L	GF	GA	GD	Pts	MBSG	MVFA	SKM	CCC
1	Mohun Bagan u16	3	2	1	0	11	2	+9	7		1–1	4–0	
2	Manbazar Vivekananda FA u17	3	2	1	0	4	1	+3	7			2–0	1–0
3	SKM Sports Foundation u17	3	1	0	2	4	6	−2	3				
4	Chinsurah Junior Football Coaching Camp u17	3	0	0	3	1	11	−10	0	1–6		0–4	

Updated to match(es) played on 23 December. Source:

18 December 2025 1	Mohun Bagan u16	4 – 0	SKM Sports Academy u17	Kolkata, India
08:30 IST	Malswam Tulunga; Prantick	Report		Stadium: Bansberia Kishore Sangha Ground

20 December 2025 2	Mohun Bagan u16	1 – 1	Manbazar Vivekananda FA u17	Kolkata, India
08:30 IST	Malswam Tulunga	Report		Stadium: Bansberia Kishore Sangha Ground

23 December 2025 3	Chinsurah Junior Football Coaching Camp u17	1 – 6	Mohun Bagan u16	Kolkata, India
08:30 IST		Report	Rajdeep Pal; Rohit; Riju; Malswam Tulunga; Rishi	Stadium: Kanchrapara Rail Math

==== Round 2 ====
Rajdeep, Malswam scored, as Mohun Bagan U16 Boys defeated Admas United SA 2-0 in the first match of the 2nd Round of RFYS U17 Championship. In the second match Mohun Bagan Boys' defeated Manbazar Vivekananda FA by 4-1 with Samuel, Malswam, Rajdeep Prantik scoring the four goals for Bagan. In the final game Mohun Bagan U16 Boys defeated The Nabadwip Athletic 3-0, courtesy to the goals from Malswam, Rishi and Riju. With that victory, Mohun Bagan qualified for the Final Round as Table Toppers.

Pos	Team	Pld	W	D	L	GF	GA	GD	Pts	MBSG	AUSA	MVFA	TNA
1	Mohun Bagan u16	3	3	0	0	9	1	+8	9		2–0		
2	Adamas United Sports Academy u17	3	2	0	1	4	2	+2	6			3–0 (Note: Walkover)	
3	Manbazar Vivekananda FA u17	3	1	0	2	4	8	−4	3	1–4			3–1
4	The Nabadwip Athletic	3	0	0	3	1	7	−6	0	0–3	0–1		

Updated to match(es) played on 6 January. Source:

3 January 2026 1	Mohun Bagan u16	2 – 0	Adamas United SA u17	Kolkata, India
14:30 IST	Malswam Tulunga; Rajdeep Pal	Report

5 January 2026 2	Manbazar Vivekananda FA u17	1 – 4	Mohun Bagan u16	Kalyani, India
14:30 IST		Report	Samuel; Malswam Tulunga; Rajdeep Pal; Prantik	Stadium: Kalyani B Block (B3) Ground

6 January 2026 3	The Nabadwip Athletic	0 – 3	Mohun Bagan u16	Kalyani, India
14:30 IST		Report	Malswam Tulunga; Rishi; Riju	Stadium: Kalyani B Block (B3) Ground

==== Round 3 ====
Due to the clash of fixtures with the AIFF u16 Junior League, Mohun Bagan withdrew their name from the competition and didnot participate in the final round.

=== Group Stage ===
Pos	Team	Pld	W	D	L	GF	GA	GD	Pts	EBFC	MBSG	BFA	BFC	BMSA	AUSA	MSC
1	East Bengal	12	9	2	1	40	7	+33	29		2–2	1–0	1–0	7–2	5–0	9–0
2	Mohun Bagan	12	9	2	1	40	10	+30	29	0–3		6–0	2–1	5–1	1–0	6–0
3	Bengal Football Academy	12	7	2	3	30	17	+13	23	0–2	2–2		2–0	1–1	1–0	7–0
4	Bhawanipore Club	12	6	0	6	17	16	+1	18	3–1	0–4	1–2		2–1	2–0	4–0
5	Bidhannagar Municipal Sports Academy	12	3	3	6	13	28	−15	12	0–0	0–7	2–3	0–1		2–2	2–0
6	Adamas United Sports Academy	12	3	1	8	12	27	−15	10	0–3	1–3	2–8	2–1	0–1		3–0
7	Mohammedan	12	0	0	12	1	48	−47	0	0–6	0–2	0–4	1–2	0–1	0–2	

Updated to match(es) played on 11 April 2026. Source: AIFF u16

13 January 2026 1	Mohun Bagan U16	6 – 0	Mohammedan SC U16	Kolkata, India
11:30 IST	Rajdeep Paul 18', 60', 74'; Samuel Lalrinzuala 72'; Rishi Das 78', 87'	Report	Shibnath Mondal (yellow card) 23'; Arian Sekh (yellow card) 50'; Soumyajit Mondal (yellow card) 55'	Stadium: Bansberia Kishore Sangha Ground; Attendance: 156; Referee: Onkar Biswas; Man of the Match: Samuel Lalrinzuala (Mohun Bagan)

16 January 2026 2	Mohammedan U16	0 – 2	Mohun Bagan U16	West Bengal, India
14:00 IST		Report	Rajdeep Pal 45+1'; Samuel Lalrinzuala 83'	Stadium: Mohammedan Sporting Ground; Attendance: 1025; Referee: Sarnendu Bagchi; Man of the Match: Rajdeep Paul (Mohun Bagan)

1 February 2026 3	East Bengal U16	2 – 2	Mohun Bagan U16	Kolkata, India
14:00 IST	Pritam Adhikari (yellow card) 55'; Arnaav Chettri 67', 90+2' (pen.)	Report	Sandip Karmakar (yellow card) 25'; Rajdeep Paul 55', 89'; Suroj Halder (yellow card) 56'; Sayan Halder (yellow card) 62'; Samuel Lalrinzuala (red card) 63'	Stadium: East Bengal Ground; Attendance: 70; Referee: SK Safick

9 February 2026 4	Bengal Football Academy	2 – 2	Mohun Bagan U16	Kolkata, India
14:00 IST	Subhajeet Rajbanshi (yellow card) 15' , (goal) 50'; Tapas Mondal (yellow card) 64'; Kartik Bishui (yellow card) 66'; Santiram Hansda 90'	Report	Rajdeep Paul 28', 80'; Prantik Hansda (yellow card) 45+1'	Stadium: Vivekananda Stadium, Khardah; Attendance: 100; Referee: Saikat Dey; Man of the Match: Santiram Hansda (BFA)

17 February 2026 5	Mohun Bagan U16	2 – 1	Bhawanipore Club	Kolkata, India
11:30 IST	Rajdeep Paul 1', 11' , (yellow card) 40' (yellow-red card) 81'; Rishi Das (yellow card) 70' (yellow-red card) 80'; Arko Bhaskar (yellow card) 90+4'	Report	Sk Sajid (yellow card) 14'; Bikash Sardar (yellow card) 31'; Sukdev Mohali (yellow card) 45'; Sahalam Molla (yellow card) 48'; Sk Mohasin 85'	Stadium: Bansberia Kishore Sangha Ground; Attendance: 200; Referee: Saikat Dey

25 February 2026 6	Mohun Bagan U16	1 – 0	Adamas United Sports Academy	Kolkata, India
11:30 IST	Sayan Halder (yellow card) 27'; Samuel Lalrinzuala 89'	Report	Abhraneel Hansda (yellow card) 52'; Anisur Badsha (yellow card) 55'	Stadium: Bansberia Kishore Sangha Ground; Attendance: 250; Referee: Onkar Biswas; Man of the Match: Samuel Lalrinzuala (Mohun Bagan)

5 March 2025 7	Adamas United Sports Academy	1 – 3	Mohun Bagan U16	West Bengal, India
14:00 IST	Debanshu Kayal (yellow card) 42'; Prantik Basu 90+3'	Report	Rishi Das (yellow card) 54'; Samuel Lalrinzuala 66'; Rajdeep Paul 76', 80'	Stadium: Barrackpore Bibhutibhushan Krirangan; Attendance: 100; Referee: Subrata Das; Man of the Match: Rajdeep Paul (Mohun Bagan)

11 March 2026 8	Mohun Bagan U16	6 – 0	Bengal Football Academy	West Bengal, India
11:30 IST	Rishi Das (yellow card) 40'; Arko Bhaskar 45+3'; Avranil Biswas 52'; Rajdeep Paul 58', 63' (pen.), 78'; Sayan Halder 82'	Report	Ankush Paul (yellow card) 62'	Stadium: Bansberia Kishore Sangha Ground; Attendance: 150; Referee: CHaran Kumar Hembram

17 March 2026 9	Mohun Bagan U16	5 – 1	Bidhannagar Municipal Sports Academy	Kolkata, India
11:30 IST	Samuel Lalrinzuala 28'; Rajdeep Paul 62', 63', 78', 83'; Ahon Banerjee (yellow card) 90+3'	Report	Subhrodeep Nandi (yellow card) 41'; Rajib Shikari 50'; Miraj Mondal (yellow card) 59'	Stadium: Bansberia Kishore Sangha Ground; Attendance: 300; Referee: Avisekh Saha

24 March 2026 10	Bidhannagar Municipal Sports Academy	0 – 7	Mohun Bagan U16	Kolkata, India
14:00 IST	Abhi Prasad (yellow card) 33'; Rajib Shikari (yellow card) 76'	Report	Rajdeep Paul 2', 15', 45', 48'; Sayan Halder 67'; Arko Bhaskar 79'; Avranil Biswas 85'	Stadium: BMSA Ground; Attendance: 273; Referee: SK Safick; Man of the Match: Rajdeep Paul (Mohun Bagan)

30 March 2026 11	Bhawanipore Club	0 – 4	Mohun Bagan U16	Kolkata, India
14:00 IST	Sk Mohasin (yellow card) 66'	Report	Samuel Lalrinzuala 41', (yellow card) 84'; Sayan Halder 56'; Rajdeep Paul 85'; Ebenezer Sun 89'	Stadium: Uluberia Stadium; Attendance: 30; Referee: Santosh Yadav

4 April 2026 12	Mohun Bagan U16	0 – 3	East Bengal U16	Kolkata, India
11:30 IST	Sayan Halder (yellow card) 56'	Report	Sisir Sarkar 28', 48'; Romit Das (yellow card) 59'; Akash Mondal 86'	Stadium: Bansberia Kishore Sangha Ground; Attendance: 3 Referee: Shovan Roy; Man of the Match: Sisir Sarkar (East Bengal FC)

=== National Group Stage ===
Pos	Team	Pld	W	D	L	GF	GA	GD	Pts	AFA	PFC	MBSG	RFYC
1	Alchemy International FA	3	2	1	0	5	1	+4	7		1–1	1–0	3–0
2	Punjab FC	3	1	2	0	4	3	+1	5			0–0	3–2
3	Mohun Bagan u16	3	1	1	1	3	2	+1	4				3–1
4	RF Young Champs	3	0	0	3	3	9	−6	0				

Source: AIFF u16

4 May 2026 1	Alchemy International FA	1 – 0	Mohun Bagan U16	Goa, India
16:00 IST	Sourish Nair 42'; Rahul Sachdeva (yellow card) 50'	Report		Stadium: Raia Football Stadium; Attendance: 80; Referee: Satvir Singh; Man of the Match: Eliayash (Alchemy International FA)

6 May 2026 2	Mohun Bagan U16	3 – 1	RF Young Champs	Goa, India
16:00 IST	Sayan Halder 27'; Samuel Lalrinzuala (yellow card) 46'; Rajdeep Paul 47', 90+2'	Report	Subhrajit Pramanick 73'; Ayman Bilalpm (yellow card) 90+4'	Stadium: Don Bosco Football Ground; Attendance: 120; Referee: Yerramreddy Krishna Reddy; Man of the Match: Rajdeep Paul (Mohun Bagan)

8 May 2026 3	Mohun Bagan U16	0 – 0	Punjab	Goa, India
16:00 IST	Avranil Biswas (yellow card) 61'	Report	Kamlesh Chand (yellow card) 42'	Stadium: Raia Football Stadium; Attendance: 346; Referee: Shihabudheen P Man of the Match: Ranjan Malo (Mohun Bagan)

=== Appearances ===
Players with no appearances are not included in the list.

As of 8 May 2026

Appearances for Mohun Bagan in 2025–26 season
No.	Pos.	Nat.	Name	AIFF U16 Zonal		AIFF U16 National		Total	
No.	Pos.	Nat.	Name	Apps	Starts	Apps	Starts	Apps	Starts
Goalkeepers
1	GK	(India)	Argho Sarkar	7	6	—		6	6
21	GK	(India)	Ranjan Malo	7	6	3	3	10	9
Defenders
4	DF	(India)	Avranil Biswas	12	12	3	3	15	15
5	DF	(India)	Sandeep Karmakar	12	12	3	3	15	15
14	DF	(India)	Jay Soren	2	0	3	3	5	3
25	DF	(India)	Papu Sarkar	1	0	—		1	0
Midfielders
2	MF	(India)	Suroj Halder	12	12	3	3	15	15
3	MF	(India)	Paulbious Tariang	7	6	—		7	6
6	MF	(India)	Samuel Lalrinzuala	11	11	3	3	14	14
7	MF	(India)	Rohit Barman	12	12	3	3	15	15
8	MF	(India)	Sayan Halder	11	11	3	3	14	14
11	MF	(India)	Prantik Hansda	10	9	3	3	13	12
12	MF	(India)	Arko Bhaskar	12	1	1	0	13	1
17	MF	(India)	Chowdhury Sahid	3	0	—		3	0
18	MF	(India)	Abir Moulick	2	0	—		2	0
23	MF	(India)	Ebenezer Sun	12	12	3	3	15	15
24	MF	(India)	Akash SK	9	5	—		9	5
30	MF	(India)	Manab Marjit	4	0	—		4	0
Forwards
9	LW	(India)	Rishi Das	9	3	2	0	11	3
10	LW	(India)	Rajdeep Pal	11	11	3	3	14	14
19	LW	(India)	Abhra Dey	9	4	2	0	11	4
27	LW	(India)	Ahon Banerjee	1	0	—		1	0

=== Goals ===
As of 8 May 2026

Rank	No.	Nat.	Name	AIFF U16 Zonal	AIFF U16 National	Total
1	10	(India)	Rajdeep Paul	24	2	26
2	6	(India)	Samuel Lalrinzuala	6	0	6
3	8	(India)	Sayan Halder	3	1	4
4	4	(India)	Avranil Biswas	2	0	2
4	9	(India)	Rishi Das	2	0	2
4	12	(India)	Arko Bhaskar	2	0	2
5	23	(India)	Ebenezer Sun	1	0	1
Total				40	3	43

=== Cleansheets ===
As of 8 May 2026

Rank	No.	Nat.	Name	AIFF U16 Zonal	AIFF U16 National	Total
1	21	(India)	Ranjan Malo	3	1	4
2	1	(India)	Eklas Molla	3	0	3
Total				6	1	7

=== Disciplinary Record ===
As of 8 May 2026

No.	Nat.	Name	AIFF U16 Zonal			AIFF U16 National			Total		
No.	Nat.	Name	Booked	(yellow card) (yellow-red card)	Sent off (straight red)	Booked	(yellow card) (yellow-red card)	Sent off (straight red)	Booked	(yellow card) (yellow-red card)	Sent off (straight red)
9	(India)	Rishi Das	2	1	0	—			2	1	0
6	(India)	Samuel Lalrinzuala	1	0	1	1	0	0	2	0	1
8	(India)	Sayan Halder	3	0	0	—			3	0	0
10	(India)	Rajdeep Pal	0	1	0	—			0	1	0
2	(India)	Suraj Halder	1	0	0	—			1	0	0
4	(India)	Avranil Biswas	—			1	0	0	1	0	0
5	(India)	Sandeep Karmakar	1	0	0	—			1	0	0
11	(India)	Prantik Hansda	1	0	0	—			1	0	0
12	(India)	Arko Bhaskar	1	0	0	—			1	0	0
27	(India)	Ahon Banerjee	1	0	0	—			1	0	0
Total			9	2	1	2	0	0	11	2	1

== U14 ==
=== Squad ===
Note: Flags indicate national team as defined under FIFA eligibility rules; some limited exceptions apply. Players may hold more than one non-FIFA nationality.

No.	Pos.	Nation	Player
1	GK	IND	Somnath Tudu
21	GK	IND	Siddhartha Ganguly
31	GK	IND	Rupam Biswas
2	DF	IND	Jiyon Hansda
3	DF	IND	Bikash Halder
4	DF	IND	Agni Kuiley
5	DF	IND	Dorpon Hatiburuah
6	DF	IND	Jishu Chakraborty
14	DF	IND	Irfan Biswas
26	DF	IND	Rahul Balmiki
8	MF	IND	J Kavin Jei
9	MF	IND	P Today
11	MF	IND	Kartick Hembram
12	MF	IND	Jit Mondal

No.	Pos.	Nation	Player
15	MF	IND	Shreyan Dey
16	MF	IND	Subhankar Malakar
17	MF	IND	P. Tyson Sharma
18	MF	IND	Akash SK
19	MF	IND	Sahil Uddin
22	MF	IND	Rahul Roy
23	MF	IND	Nirab Roy
24	MF	IND	Anubrata Baul Das
7	FW	IND	Sidu Soren
10	FW	IND	Shagnik Kundu
20	FW	IND	Raju Mudi
25	FW	IND	Aritra Chatterjee
27	FW	IND	SK Nur Wairif
28	FW	IND	Archisman Paul

=== Zonal Group Stage ===
Pos	Team	Pld	W	D	L	GF	GA	GD	Pts	Qualification	MBSG	EBFC	BFA	SKM	BFC	AUSA	BMSA	MSC
1	Mohun Bagan u14	12	9	3	0	31	4	+27	30	Advance to National group stage		1–0	2–0	2–0	1–0	2–1	5–1	~~27 Feb~~
2	East Bengal u14	12	8	3	1	31	7	+24	27	Advance to National group stage	1–1		2–2	7–2	2–0	2–1	3–0	~~14-0~~
3	Bengal Football Academy	12	7	4	1	28	9	+19	25		0–0	0–0		2–1	3–1	5–0	1–1	~~6 Apr~~
4	SKM Sports Foundation	12	5	1	6	21	18	+3	16		1–1	0–3	0–1		0–1	2–0	3–0	~~13 Apr~~
5	Bhawanipore Club	12	4	0	8	13	26	−13	12		0–4	0–4	2–3	1–3		2–0	4–3	~~10-0~~
6	Adamas United Sports Academy	12	2	0	10	8	40	−32	6		0–7	0–6	0–5	0–3	3–1		2–1	~~14 Mar~~
7	Bidhannagar Municipal Sports Academy	12	1	1	10	10	38	−28	4		0–5	0–1	0–6	0–6	0–1	4–1		~~19 Feb~~
8	Mohammedan SC u14	0	0	0	0	0	0	0	0	Withdrew	~~0-23~~	~~19 Mar~~	~~0-12~~	~~0-16~~	~~1 Apr~~	~~26 Mar~~	~~8 Mar~~	

Updated to match(es) played on 12 April, 2026. Source: AIFF u14

15 January 2026 1	Mohun Bagan U14	2 – 1	Adamas United Sports Academy	Kolkata, India
11:30 IST	Agni Kuiley 13'; Jishu Chakraborty 24'; P Today (yellow card) 27'	Report	Hrisov Das (yellow card) 30'; Kazi Sakibul Islam (yellow card) 34'; Rohit Patra 50'	Stadium: Bansberia Kishore Sangha Ground; Attendance: 150; Referee: SK Safick

19 January 2026 2	Mohun Bagan U14	2 – 0	SKM Sports Foundation	Kolkata, India
11:30 IST	P Today 9'; Dorpon Hatiboruah (yellow card) 31' , (goal) 54'; Shagnik Kundu (yellow card) 72'	Report		Stadium: Bansberia Kishore Sangha Ground; Attendance: 55; Referee: Prithwiraj Dutta; Man of the Match: Dorpon Hatiboruah (Mohun Bagan)

3 February 2026 4	Bengal Football Academy	0 – 0	Mohun Bagan U14	Kolkata, India
14:00 IST	Rik Baskey (yellow card) 72'; Kushan Soren (yellow card) 90+1'	Report	P Today (yellow card) 70'	Stadium: Vivekananda Stadium, Khardah; Attendance: 80; Referee: Jeet Rajbanshi; Man of the Match: Rohit Tudu (BFA)

11 February 2026 5	Mohammedan U14	0 – 23	Mohun Bagan U14	West Bengal, India
14:00 IST	Farhanuddin Mallick (yellow card) 87'	Report	Dorpon Hatiboruah 1', 17', 26', 58', 64', 74'; Anubrata Baul Das 10', 11', 13', 21', 39', 52', 79', 90+3'; Kartick Hembram 19', 45+1'; Sidu Soren 30', 48'; Jishu Chakraborty 34'; Jiyon Hansda 37'; Shagnik Kundu 46', 56'; Sk Sakib Uddin 87'	Stadium: Mohammedan Sporting Ground; Attendance: 50; Referee: Dipak De

19 February 2026 6	Mohun Bagan U14	1 – 0	Bhawanipore Club	Kolkata, India
11:30 IST	Kartick Hembram (yellow card) 90+1'; Annubrata Baul Das 90+3'	Report		Stadium: Bansberia Kishore Sangha Ground; Attendance: 250; Referee: Prithwiraj Dutta

27 February 2026 7	Mohun Bagan U14	v	Mohammedan SC U14	Kolkata, India
11:30 IST				Stadium: Bansberia Kishore Sangha Ground

7 March 2026 8	Bhawanipore Club	0 – 4	Mohun Bagan U14	Kolkata, India
14:00 IST		Report	Jishu Chakraborty 27', 45+3'; Anubrata Baul Das 36'; Shagnik Kundu 59'	Stadium: Uluberia Stadium; Attendance: 1,000; Referee: Dipak De; Man of the Match: Jiyon Hansda (Mohun Bagan)

14 March 2026 9	Bidhannagar Municipal Sports Academy	0 – 5	Mohun Bagan U14	Kolkata, India
15:00 IST		Report	Jishu Chakraborty 32'; Shagnik Kundu 52', 78', 90+2'; Dorpon Hatiboruah 57'	Stadium: BMSA Ground; Attendance: 150; Referee: Suman Chowdhury

20 March 2026 10	SKM Sports Foundation	1 – 1	Mohun Bagan U14	Kolkata, India
15:00 IST	Sudip Murmu 39'; Aman Chhetri (yellow card) 87'	Report	Jishu Chakraborty (yellow card) 63' (yellow-red card) 89'; Shagnik Kundu 90+2'	Stadium: Aghornath Park Stadium, Kalna; Attendance: 100; Referee: Ranjan Halder; Man of the Match: Shagnik Kundu (Mohun Bagan)

25 March 2026 11	Mohun Bagan U14	5 – 1	Bidhannagar Municipal Sports Academy	Kolkata, India
11:30 IST	Annubrata Baul Das 14', 79', 87'; Tyson Sharma (yellow card) 49'; Bikash Halder 53'; Shreyan Dey 90+1'	Report	Supen Barman 18'; Subhas Saren (yellow card) 87'	Stadium: Bansberia Kishore Sangha Ground; Attendance: 200; Referee: Mrinal Majumder; Man of the Match: Rahul Roy (Mohun Bagan)

~~26 January 2026~~; 28 March 2026 3	East Bengal U14	1 – 1	Mohun Bagan U14	Kolkata, India
14:00 IST	Sudipto Mandi (yellow card) 18'; Bhola Rajwar 58'	Report	Dorpon Hatiboruah 48'	Stadium: East Bengal Ground; Attendance: 900; Referee: Prithwiraj Dutta; Man of the Match: Bhola Rajwar (East Bengal)

31 March 2025 12	Adamas United Sports Academy	0 – 7	Mohun Bagan U14	West Bengal, India
14:00 IST	Rajat Biswas (yellow card) 1' (yellow-red card) 70'; Rupam Paul (yellow card) 44'	Report	Shagnik Kundu 20'; Rahul Balmiki (yellow card) 21'; Tyson Sharma 29', 45', 59'; Annubrata Das 35'; Subhankar Malakar (yellow card) 50'; Rahul Roy 86'; Jishu Chakraborty 90+2'	Stadium: Barrackpore Bibhutibhushan Krirangan; Attendance: 100; Referee: SK Safick

6 April 2026 13	Mohun Bagan U14	1 – 0	East Bengal U14	Kolkata, India
11:30 IST	Tyson Sharma 44' (pen.); Jiyon Hansda (yellow card) 90+3'	Report	Mamen Wangkheirakpam (yellow card) 25'; Kartick Soren (yellow card) 49'; Bhola Rajwar (yellow card) 51'	Stadium: Bansberia Kishore Sangha Ground; Attendance: 150; Referee: Prithwiraj Dutta; Man of the Match: Tyson Sharma (Mohun Bagan)

12 April 2026 14	Mohun Bagan U14	2 – 0	Bengal Football Academy	West Bengal, India
11:30 IST	Rahul Balmiki (yellow card) 10'; Jiyon Hansda (yellow card) 24'; Jishu Chakraborty 29'; Kartick Hembram 90+2'	Report	Sabuj Mondal (yellow card) 77' (yellow-red card) 89'; Rohit Gazi (yellow card) 84'; Suman Guin (yellow card) 90+3'	Stadium: Bansberia Kishore Sangha Ground; Attendance: 200; Referee: Sayani Roy; Man of the Match: Jishu Chakraborty (Mohun Bagan)

=== National Group Stage ===
Pos	Team	Pld	W	D	L	GF	GA	GD	Pts	BFC	MBSG	SUD	SRE
1	Bengaluru FC	3	3	0	0	8	3	+5	9		2–0	4–3	2–0
2	Mohun Bagan u14	3	2	0	1	8	4	+4	6			5–1	3–1
3	Sudeva Delhi	3	1	0	2	5	9	−4	3				2–1
4	Sreenidi Deccan	3	0	0	3	2	7	−5	0				

Source: AIFF u14

3 May 2026 1	Mohun Bagan U14	0 – 2	Bengaluru	Madras, India
16:00 IST		Report	Asif Khan 36'; Leishemba Singh (yellow card) 83'; Rengbek Sekho 84'	Stadium: Furry Field; Attendance: 35; Referee: Harkomal Singh Duhra

5 May 2026 2	Sreenidi Deccan	1 – 3	Mohun Bagan U14	Madras, India
08:00 IST	Rajkumar Lanchenba 24' , (yellow card) 52'; Nivash Singh (yellow card) 45'; Jackson Meitei (yellow card) 76'	Report	Anubrata Baul Das 19'; Jiyon Hansda 73'; Jishu Chakraborty 80'	Stadium: Furry Field; Attendance: 20; Referee: Nandagopal Dharmaraj; Man of the Match: Jishu Chakraborty (Mohun Bagan)

7 May 2026 3	Sudeva Delhi	1 – 5	Mohun Bagan U14	Madras, India
08:00 IST	Seiboigun Haokip (yellow card) 78'; Maiya Kamkara 90+4'	Report	Bikash Halder 18'; Dorpon Hatiboruah 39'; Nirab Roy 63', 85', 90+3'; Jit Mondal (yellow card) 86'	Stadium: Furry Field; Attendance: 20; Referee: Alok Britto; Man of the Match: Nirab Roy (Mohun Bagan)

=== Quarter Finals ===
9 May 2026 Quarter Final	RF Young Champs	1 – 1 (5 – 4 p)	Mohun Bagan U14	Madras, India
07:30 IST	Shatish Singh 85'	Report	Rahul Balmiki (yellow card) 54'; Jiyon Hansda 58'	Stadium: Scamper Park, FC Madras Academy Ground; Attendance: 75; Referee: Alok Britto; Man of the Match: Mohit Sarkar (RFYC)
	Penalties
	(penalty scored) Shatish Singh; (penalty missed) Md Ahmad Wadoo; (penalty scored) Om Mangesh Shinde; (penalty scored) Umar Shaikh; (penalty scored) Jacob Malsawmsanga; (penalty scored) Divyansh Singhel		(penalty scored) Tyson Sharma; (penalty scored) Kartick Hembram; (penalty scored) Rahul Balmiki; (penalty missed) Jiyon Hansda; (penalty scored) Jishu Chakraborty; (penalty missed) P Today

=== Appearances ===
Players with no appearances are not included in the list.

As of 9 May 2026

Appearances for Mohun Bagan in 2025–26 season
No.	Pos.	Nat.	Name	AIFF U14 Zonal		AIFF U14 National		Total	
No.	Pos.	Nat.	Name	Apps	Starts	Apps	Starts	Apps	Starts
Goalkeepers
1	GK	(India)	Somnath Tudu	2	2	3	2	5	4
21	GK	(India)	Siddharta Ganguly	11	11	2	2	13	13
Defenders
2	DF	(India)	Jiyon Hansda	13	13	3	3	16	16
3	DF	(India)	Bikash Halder	13	12	4	4	17	16
4	DF	(India)	Agni Kuiley	8	3	—		8	3
5	DF	(India)	Dorpon Hatiboruah	13	13	4	4	17	17
14	DF	(India)	Irfan Biswas	1	0	—		1	0
24	DF	(India)	Anubrata Baul Das	12	9	4	4	16	13
26	DF	(India)	Rahul Balmiki	11	11	3	3	14	14
Midfielders
6	MF	(India)	Jishu Chakraborty	12	12	4	4	16	16
8	MF	(India)	J Kavin Jei	5	0	—		5	0
9	MF	(India)	P Today	11	7	3	0	14	7
11	MF	(India)	Kartick Hembram	13	9	3	1	16	10
12	MF	(India)	Jit Mondal	1	0	4	0	5	0
15	MF	(India)	Shreyan Dey	9	1	—		9	1
16	MF	(India)	Subhankar Malakar	5	4	4	4	9	8
17	MF	(India)	Phurailatpam Tyson Sharma	13	13	4	1	17	14
18	MF	(India)	Akash SK	1	0	—		1	0
19	MF	(India)	Sk Sakib Uddin	1	0	—		1	0
22	MF	(India)	Rahul Roy	7	1	4	4	11	5
23	MF	(India)	Nirab Roy	4	4	4	4	8	8
Forwards
7	FW	(India)	Sidu Soren	13	10	4	1	17	11
10	FW	(India)	Shagnik Kundu	13	8	4	3	17	11
27	FW	(India)	SK Nur Warif	1	0	—		1	0

=== Goals ===
As of 9 May 2026

Rank	No.	Nat.	Name	AIFF U14 Zonal	AIFF U14 National	Total
1	4	(India)	Anubrata Baul Das	14	1	15
2	5	(India)	Dorpon Hatiboruah	9	1	10
3	6	(India)	Jishu Chakraborty	7	1	8
3	10	(India)	Shagnik Kundu	8	0	8
4	17	(India)	Tyson Sharma	4	0	4
5	2	(India)	Jiyon Hansda	1	2	3
5	11	(India)	Karthik Hembram	3	0	3
5	23	(India)	Nirab Roy	0	3	3
6	3	(India)	Bikash Halder	1	1	2
6	7	(India)	Sidu Soren	2	0	2
7	4	(India)	Agni Kuiley	1	0	1
7	9	(India)	P Today	1	0	1
7	15	(India)	Shreyan Dey	1	0	1
7	19	(India)	Sk Sakib Uddin	1	0	1
7	24	(India)	Rahul Roy	1	0	1
Total				54	9	63

=== Cleansheets ===
As of 9 May 2026

Rank	No.	Nat.	Name	AIFF U16 Zonal	AIFF U16 National	Total
1	21	(India)	Siddhartha Ganguly	8	0	8
2	1	(India)	Somnath Tudu	1	0	1
Total				9	0	9

=== Disciplinary Record ===
As of 9 May 2026

No.	Nat.	Name	AIFF U14 Zonal			AIFF U14 National			Total		
No.	Nat.	Name	Booked	(yellow card) (yellow-red card)	Sent off (straight red)	Booked	(yellow card) (yellow-red card)	Sent off (straight red)	Booked	(yellow card) (yellow-red card)	Sent off (straight red)
26	(India)	Rahul Balmiki	2	0	0	1	0	0	3	0	0
2	(India)	Jiyon Hansda	2	0	0	—			2	0	0
9	(India)	P Today	2	0	0	—			2	0	0
6	(India)	Jishu Chakraborty	0	1	0	—			0	1	0
5	(India)	Dorpon Hatiboruah	1	0	0	—			1	0	0
10	(India)	Shagnik Kundu	1	0	0	—			1	0	0
11	(India)	Kartick Hembram	1	0	0	—			1	0	0
12	(India)	Jit Mondal	—			1	0	0	1	0	0
16	(India)	Subhankar Malakar	1	0	0	—			1	0	0
17	(India)	Phurailatpam Tyson Sharma	1	0	0	—			1	0	0
Total			11	1	0	2	0	0	13	1	0

== Youth Friendlies ==
=== Reserves ===
21 June 2025 1	Mohun Bagan	3–1	Behala SS	Kolkata, India
IST	Shibam Munda; Bharat Lairenjam; Chaitu

25 June 2025 2	Mohun Bagan	4–0	Bidhannagar Municipal SA	Kolkata, India
IST	Tushar Biswakarma; Sandeep; Own goal (o.g.)

16 August 2025 3	United Kolkata SC	2–1	Mohun Bagan	Kolkata, India
IST		Report
