= Mohun Bagan SG Youth and Academy =

Reserve team and youth system of Mohun Bagan Super Giant

Mohun Bagan Youth
- Nicknames: The Mariners; The Green and Maroons; Sobuj Maroon
- Short name: MBSG
- Founded: 2002; 24 years ago
- Ground: Mohun Bagan Ground
- Capacity: 22,000
- Owners: RPSG Mohun Bagan Pvt. Ltd.: RPSG Group (80%); Mohun Bagan Football Club (India) Pvt. Ltd. (20%)
- Chairman: Sanjiv Goenka
- Head coach: Bastab Roy
- League: CFL Premier Division (Reserves); RF Development League; AIFF Elite League
Home colours	Away colours

Mohun Bagan SG Under-23s, Under-21s, Under-17s, Under-15s, and Under-13s generally known as Mohun Bagan, is the reserve team and youth system of the Indian Super League side Mohun Bagan SG. The U-21 and the reserve teams are generally referred to as last stage of progression into the senior squad. The reserve team participates in the Calcutta Football League. Youth teams also participate in the RF Development League and the AIFF Elite League. The concept for a youth team was conceived and materialised under the leadership of Balai Das Chattopadhyay in 1944.

== History ==
Mohun Bagan collaborated with Steel Authority of India Ltd. (SAIL) to establish a residential academy for youth development in 2002. On 20 July 2002 Mohun Bagan SAIL Football Academy was set up in Durgapur, and the primary objective of the academy was "Spot and Groom the Youth", with the best of training using modern techniques, tactics, physical and psychological conditioning, and related inputs, so that in near future, India could see them in the national platform.

In 2007 the club had appointed a famous Brazilian football expert Prof. Luiz Greco, as the Technical Director of the youth teams of Mohun Bagan SAIL Football Academy.

The academy teams won various trophies across the country. The academy's greatest feat was achieved in 2006 when the club's U14 team qualified for the Final Round of Nike Premier Cup (Under-14), a worldwide club tournament hosted by Manchester United, by beating East Bengal in the National Qualifier and Singapore Sports School in the final of South-East Asia Qualifier. Till then no Indian team had ever participated at the premier level since independence. The team faced some of the top clubs like Manchester United, São Paulo, Athletic Bilbao and Ferencvárosi in the group stage and, Brussels and Universidad Católica in the 17-20th place play-offs semi-finals and 19th place play-off final respectively. Unfortunately the team didn't win any match and ranked 20th in the tournament among the 20 qualified teams over the world.

From 2015 to 2018 the U-19 team participated in the prestigious IFA Shield, which was organised as an U-19 tournament due to the busy schedules of the clubs' senior teams. Mohun Bagan was the runners-up for two consecutive seasons, 2017 and 2018.

In 2017 the U-15 team defeated ATK by a record 13–0 scoreline in the opening match of AIFF U15 Youth League.

In 2019 the U-19 team also participated in a regional franchise-based Talent Hunt league called Zee Bangla Football League that featured the top 4 clubs of West Bengal (Mohun Bagan, East Bengal, Mohammedan and Aryan) along with 16 franchise teams representing various districts of the state. The organisers declared both Mohun Bagan and East Bengal as the winners after the final match was abandoned due to fan unrest.

In 2020, after KGSPL, owners of ATK FC, disbanded ATK and acquired an 80% stake in the footballing section of Mohun Bagan, the youth academy team was disbanded for the next two seasons.

In June 2022, fresh trials were conducted under senior team head coach Juan Ferrando to set up new under-13, under-15 and under-18 teams, and UEFA Pro License holder Spanish coach Josep Maria Roma Gilbert was appointed from Al Hilal to take charge of the U-21 team. In the 2022–23 U-17 Youth Cup, the team failed to qualify for the knockout stages. The reserve team of Mohun Bagan participated in the Reliance Foundation Development League for the first time. This competition is predominantly for the under-21 age group, with five under-23 players allowed in the squad and three in the playing XI. They successfully secured a third place and qualified for Next Gen Cup where they ranked 6th. The reserve side also participated in the CFL Premier Division under the senior team's assistant coach Bastob Roy who replaced Gilbert from the new season.

As of the 2024–25 season, the Mohun Bagan Youths team participates in various age group Regional and National level tournaments -

- AIFF Sub Junior League (U13)
- AIFF Junior League (U15)
- Reliance Foundation Youth Sports (U15)
- Indian Youth League (U17)
- Dream Sports Championship (U17)
- Chief Minister's Cup (U21/Reserves)
- Bhadreshwar Gold Cup (U21/Reserves)
- Reliance Foundation Development League (U21/Reserves)
- Calcutta Premiere Division (U23/Reserves)

== U23 ==
=== Squad ===
As of 29 June 2025

Note: Flags indicate national team as defined under FIFA eligibility rules; some limited exceptions apply. Players may hold more than one non-FIFA nationality.

No.	Pos.	Nation	Player
61	GK	IND	Deeprobhat Ghosh
51	GK	IND	Nandan Roy
91	GK	IND	Priyansh Dubey
70	DF	IND	Achinta Das
78	DF	IND	Piyush Thakuri
96	DF	IND	Pabitra Mandi
65	DF	IND	Marshal Kisku
32	DF	IND	Aditiya Mondal
4	DF	IND	Sahil Inamdar
73	DF	IND	Umer Muhther
36	DF	IND	Muhammad Bilal CV
77	DF	IND	Thangjam Roshan Singh
44	MF	IND	Nishar
74	MF	IND	Sahil Kar
56	MF	IND	Sandeep Malik

No.	Pos.	Nation	Player
80	MF	IND	Mingma Sherpa
17	MF	IND	Muhammad Niyaj
81	MF	IND	Thumsol Tongsin
25	MF	IND	Tushar Biswakarma
50	MF	IND	Gogocha Chungkham
42	MF	IND	Gurnaj Singh Grewal
30	MF	IND	Pallujam Rohan Singh
55	MF	IND	Yendrembam Rohit Singh
79	MF	IND	Taibangnganba Pangabam
98	FW	IND	Karan Rai
90	FW	IND	Adil Abdullah
43	FW	IND	Shibam Munda
27	FW	IND	Bharat Lairenjam
62	FW	IND	Bivan Jyoti Laskar
71	FW	IND	Salahudheen Adnan K
72	FW	IND	Pasang Tamang

=== Performance record ===
As of 30 August 2025

Performance of Mohun Bagan in Calcutta Football League
Season	Result	Played	Won	Draw	Lose	GF	GA
2023	5th of 6 in super six	15	8	3	4	33	16
2024	7th of 13 in Group Stage	12	4	4	4	28	15
2025	6th of 13 in Group Stage	12	6	2	4	24	14
2026	2nd of 13 in Group Stage	3	2	1	0	8	1

== U21 ==
=== Squad ===
As of 14 January 2025

Note: Flags indicate national team as defined under FIFA eligibility rules; some limited exceptions apply. Players may hold more than one non-FIFA nationality.

No.	Pos.	Nation	Player
24	GK	IND	Syed Zahid
51	GK	IND	Nandan Roy
91	GK	IND	Priyansh Dubey
55	RB	IND	Pritam Meetei
77	RB	IND	Ravi Bahadur Rana (U-23)
79	LB	IND	Jetlee Singh
65	LB	IND	Marshal Kisku
36	LB	IND	Amandeep Vrish Bhan
3	CB	IND	Raj Basfore
4	CB	IND	Sahil Inamdar
73	CB	IND	Umer Muhther
78	CB	IND	Abhishek Mondal
53	CB	IND	Leewan Castanha
54	LM	IND	Dev Mal
43	LM	IND	Shibam Munda
72	LM	IND	Pasang Tamang
50	RM	IND	Taison Singh
37	RM	IND	Rahul Halder

No.	Pos.	Nation	Player
40	RM	IND	Haodamlian Vaiphei
44	CM	IND	Nishar
74	CM	IND	Sahil Kar
66	CM	IND	Sibajit Singh
30	CM	IND	Ningomba Engson Singh (U-23)
56	CM	IND	Sandeep Malik
81	CM	IND	Thumsol Tongsin
93	CM	IND	Lungoulal Kipgen
70	AM	IND	Tapan Halder
25	AM	IND	Tushar Biswakarma
10	FW	IND	Serto Kom
90	FW	IND	Adil Abdullah
99	FW	IND	Prem Hansdak
27	FW	IND	Fardin Ali Molla (U-23)
62	FW	IND	Vian Vinay Murgod
7	FW	IND	Suhail Bhat
80	FW	IND	Thangngaisang Haokip

=== Performance record ===
As of 23 March 2026

Performance of Mohun Bagan in Reliance Foundation Development League
Season	Result	Played	Won	Draw	Lose	Reference
2022	Did not participate					
2023	3rd	15	10	3	2	
2024	3rd of 5 in National Group	14	6	3	5	
2025	Champions	20	12	5	3	
2026	4th of 6 in National Group	20	9	6	5	

Performance of Mohun Bagan in Next Gen Cup
Season	Result	Played	Won	Draw	Lose
2022	Did not participate				
2023	6th	4	0	2	2
2024	Did not qualify				
2025	Not Held				

== U17 ==
=== Squad ===
As of 5 January 2025

Note: Flags indicate national team as defined under FIFA eligibility rules; some limited exceptions apply. Players may hold more than one non-FIFA nationality.

No.	Pos.	Nation	Player
1	GK	IND	Argho Sarkar
51	GK	IND	Nandan Roy
99	GK	IND	Seiminlal Haokip
24	DF	IND	Jetlee Singh
4	DF	IND	Rupam Barik
28	DF	IND	Adrito Mahato
3	DF	IND	Aditya Mondal
44	DF	IND	Jayanta Mondal
21	DF	IND	Monu Rajbanshi
2	DF	IND	Abhishek Mondal
40	DF	IND	Rajdeep Kshetrapal
26	DF	IND	Mahammad Sarfaraz
29	MF	IND	Abrar Ali
7	MF	IND	Anish Das
33	MF	IND	Rintu Malik

No.	Pos.	Nation	Player
10	MF	IND	Bobby Singh
6	MF	IND	Sainak Ghosh
22	MF	IND	Rajib Bauldas
15	MF	IND	Aniket Biswas
16	MF	IND	Sabyasachi Dhar
19	MF	IND	Ali Hossain Khan
8	MF	IND	Stephen Doungle
27	MF	IND	Lungoulal Kipgen
31	MF	IND	Khaiminlal Khongsai
85	FW	IND	Thangngaisang Haokip
86	FW	IND	Prem Hansdak
87	FW	IND	Sagun Hembram
88	FW	IND	Akash Singh
89	FW	IND	Pritam Gain

=== Performance record ===
As of 21 April 2026

Performance of Mohun Bagan in Youth Leagues
Season	Tournament	Result	Reference
2002–03	NFL U-19	??	
2003–04	NFL U-19	Not Held	
2004–05	NFL U-19	Champions	
2005–06	NFL U-19	Not Held	
2006–07	NFL U-19	Not Held	
2008	I-League U19	Semi Finals	
2009	I-League U19	Not Held	
2010	I-League U19	Championship Group Stage	
2011	I-League U19	Group Stage	
2012	I-League U20	Group Stage	
2013	I-League U20	5th of 6th in Final Round	
2014	I-League U19	Group Stage	
2014-15	I-League U19	6th of 8th in Final Round	
2015–16	I-League U-18	Group Stage	
2016–17	I-League U-18	Disqualified (Note: Mohun Bagan disqualified for fielding over-age player.)	
2017–18	Youth League U-18	Zonal Group Stage	
2018–19	Elite League U-18	Quarter Finals	
2019–20	Elite League U-18	Abandoned (Note: League called-off due to the COVID-19 pandemic.)	
2020-21	Elite League U-18	Not Held	
2021-22	Elite League U-18	Not Held	
2022–23	U17 Youth Cup	Group Stages	
2023–24	U17 Youth Cup	National Group Stage	
2024–25	U17 Youth Cup	Quarter Finals	
2025–26	U18 Elite League	National Group Stage	

== U15 ==
=== Squad ===
As of 8 February 2025

Note: Flags indicate national team as defined under FIFA eligibility rules; some limited exceptions apply. Players may hold more than one non-FIFA nationality.

No.	Pos.	Nation	Player
1	GK	IND	Ranjan Malo
21	GK	IND	Priyanshu Das
31	GK	IND	Debayan Dutta Roy
18	DF	IND	Paban Das
48	DF	IND	Rupam Mahi
4	DF	IND	Papu Sarkar
25	DF	IND	Naim Mondal
17	DF	IND	Dipra Sarkar
16	DF	IND	Mikael Besra
23	DF	IND	Tapas Mondal
20	DF	IND	Sayan Paswan
3	DF	IND	Sandip Karmakar
22	DF	IND	Biswajit Debnath

No.	Pos.	Nation	Player
15	MF	IND	Roki Das
6	MF	IND	Akash SK
42	MF	IND	Hans Biswas
19	MF	IND	Dipanjan Das
2	MF	IND	Rohit Barman
11	MF	IND	Arko Bhaskar
12	MF	IND	Sahid Chowdhury
14	MF	IND	Joy Chakraborty
7	MF	IND	Oyshik Roy Chowdhury
9	FW	IND	Sumit Singh
8	FW	IND	Suroj Halder
10	FW	IND	Rajdeep Paul

=== Performance record ===
Performance of Mohun Bagan in U-15 Youth Leagues
Year	Tournament	Final Position	Played	Won	Draw	Loss	GF	GA
2005-06	U-15 Nike Premier Cup Indian Qualifiers	Champions	4	4	0	0	7	2
2006-07	U-15 Nike Premier Cup Indian Qualifiers	Semi Finals	3	1	1	1	9	2
2007-08	U-15 Nike Premier Cup Indian Qualifiers	Group Stage	2	0	2	0	2	2
2008-09	U-15 Nike Premier Cup Indian Qualifiers	Disqualified						
2015-16	U-15 Youth League	Zonal Round	10	2	1	7	11	17
2016-17	U-16 Youth League	National Finals	13	8	3	2	24	4
2017-18	Nike Premier Cup	Zonal Round	10	6	2	2	26	7
2018-19	U-15 Hero Junior League	National Group Stage	9	6	1	2	24	16
2019-20	U-15 Hero Junior League	League called-off due to the COVID-19 pandemic	10	8	2	0	31	7
2020-21	U-15 Hero Junior League	Not Held						
2021-22	U-15 Hero Junior League	Not Held						
2022-23	U-15 Hero Junior League	Not Held						
2023-24	U-15 Hero Junior League	Quarter Finals	14	9	2	3	26	13
2024-25	U-15 Hero Junior League	Quarter Finals	14	11	1	2	54	22
2025-26	AIFF u16 Junior League	National Group Stage	14	10	2	2	43	12

== U13 ==
=== Squad ===
As of 2 March 2025

Note: Flags indicate national team as defined under FIFA eligibility rules; some limited exceptions apply. Players may hold more than one non-FIFA nationality.

No.	Pos.	Nation	Player
1	GK	IND	Sayan Debnath
21	GK	IND	Hiranmoy Das
31	GK	IND	Rupam Biswas
2	DF	IND	Ishan Manna
3	DF	IND	Gourav Sil
4	DF	IND	Jishu Chakraborty
5	DF	IND	Srijan Koley
27	DF	IND	Ali Hussain
32	DF	IND	Souvik Sikdar
6	MF	IND	Nirab Roy
7	MF	IND	Karthik Hembram
8	MF	IND	Syed Bashir Anowar
11	MF	IND	Jiyon Hansda
12	MF	IND	Ehsan Mondal
28	MF	IND	Lorence Kishku

No.	Pos.	Nation	Player
29	MF	IND	Bijoy Das
33	MF	IND	Rony Karmakar
34	MF	IND	Subrata Mandi
42	MF	IND	Rupam Manna
45	MF	IND	Sk Sakib
46	MF	IND	Sk Sakibuddin
48	MF	IND	Bakibillah
49	MF	IND	Abhijit Hansda
9	FW	IND	Shagnik Kundu
10	FW	IND	Sidu Soren
30	FW	IND	Archisman Paul
35	FW	IND	Anubrata Baul Das
36	FW	IND	Raj Mudi
37	FW	IND	Sandip Roy

=== Performance record ===
Performance of Mohun Bagan in U-13 Youth Leagues
Season	Tournament	Result	Played	Won	Draw	Loss	GF	GA	Top Scorer (Goals)
2017-18	U13- Hero Sub Junior League	Zonal Group Stage (3rd)	10	3	4	3	9	6	Dip Mahata (4)
2018-19	U13- Hero Sub Junior League	Zonal Group Stage (2nd)	8	5	1	2	13	5	Miraj Mullick (4)
2019-20	U13- Hero Sub Junior League	Abandoned (Note: League called-off due to the COVID-19 pandemic.)	8	2	2	4	5	9	Ajoy Oraw(2)
2020-21	U13- Hero Sub Junior League	Not Held							
2021-22	U13- Hero Sub Junior League	Not Held							
2022-23	U13- Hero Sub Junior League	Not Held							
2023-24	U13 AIFF Sub Junior League	Group Stage (3rd)	10	5	2	3	32	22	Dipra Sarkar (10)
2024-25	U13 AIFF Sub Junior League	National Group Stage	13	8	1	4	43	24	Shagnik Kundu (13)

== Honours ==
=== Global ===
- South-East Asia Qualifiers for Manchester United Premier Cup: 2006

=== National ===
- National Football League U-19 (1): (gold) 2004–05
- Reliance Foundation Development League: (gold) 2024–25, (bronze) 2023–24
- Chief Minister's Cup (1): (gold) 2024–25
- Dream Sports Championship U17: (silver) 2024–25

=== Regional ===
- Zee Bangla U-19 Football League (1): (gold) 2019 (Note: Joint winners with East Bengal)
- Bhadreshwar Gold Cup (1): (gold) 2024-25

== Notable players ==
- (India) Sunil Chhetri
- (India) Subrata Pal
- (India) Sandip Nandy
- (India) Subhankar Adhikari
- (India) Abhash Thapa
- (India) Pintu Mahata
- (India) Deepak Tangri
- (India) Souvik Chakrabarti
- (India) Subha Ghosh
- (India) Deep Saha
- (India) Rahim Ali
- (India) Sourav Das
- (India) Akshunna Tyagi
- (India) Sheikh Sahil
- (India) Kiyan Nassiri
- (India) Suhail Bhat
- (India) Arsh Anwer Shaikh
- (India) Lalrinliana Hnamte
- (India) Mahroos siddiquee Nadim
