= 2017–18 Youth League U18 =

Youth League U18
- Season: 2017–18
- Champions: Shillong Lajong
- Matches: 235
- Goals: 797 (3.39 per match)
- Top goalscorer: Manvir Singh (14 goals)
- Biggest home win: Pune City 16–0 Kenkre
- Biggest away win: Raman Vijayan Football School 2–16 Bengaluru
- Highest scoring: Chennaiyin 15–4 Raman Vijayan Football School

The 2017–18 Youth League U18 (formerly known as I-League U18) was the tenth season of the Indian Youth League U18 and the third season of the competition as an under-18 one. AIFF announced that the zonal rounds for the league that started from 20 November 2017 in Chennai, Maharashtra, Kolkata and Delhi. AIFF Elite Academy were three-time defending champions, but did not participate in the tournament. Shillong Lajong won their first title by defeating Kerala Blasters 2–0 in the final on 26 May 2018.

== Qualifiers ==
=== Kolkata zone ===
Pos	Team	Pld	W	D	L	GF	GA	GD	Pts	Qualification	SAI	USC	BFA
1	SAI (East Zone)	4	2	2	0	4	2	+2	8	Advanced to zonal round	—	1–1	1–0
2	United	4	1	2	1	5	4	+1	5	Advanced to zonal round	1–2	—	2–0
3	Bengal Football Academy	4	0	2	2	1	4	−3	2		0–0	1–1	—

Source: I league.org

== Zonal round ==
Tiebreakers
The teams are ranked according to points (3 points for a win, 1 point for a draw, 0 points for a loss). If two or more teams are equal on points on completion of the group matches, the following criteria are applied in the order given to determine the rankings:
1. Greater number of points obtained in the matches between the Teams concerned
2. Goal difference resulting from the matches between the Teams concerned
3. Greater number of goals scored in the matches between the Teams concerned
4. Goal difference in all the matches
5. Greater number of goals scored in all the matches
6. Drawing of lots

=== Delhi zone ===
Pos	Team	Pld	W	D	L	GF	GA	GD	Pts	Qualification	SDV	BBFS	DDFC	IYSA	DU	HIN
1	Sudeva Moonlight	10	8	2	0	25	8	+17	26	Advance to final round	—	1–0	4–1	2–0	2–2	4–0
2	Bhaichung Bhutia FS	10	8	0	2	26	6	+20	24	Advance to final round	1–2	—	1–0	6–0	2–0	5–1
3	Delhi Dynamos	10	4	2	4	18	15	+3	14		1–5	1–2	—	3–0	3–0	4–0
4	India Youth Soccer Association	10	2	3	5	10	19	−9	9		1–2	0–2	2–2	—	1–1	3–0
5	Delhi United	10	1	4	5	10	23	−13	7		2–2	0–4	0–0	0–2	—	2–5
6	Hindustan	10	1	1	8	11	29	−18	4		0–1	1–3	1–3	1–1	2–3	—

Source: soccerway

=== Kolkata zone ===
Pos	Team	Pld	W	D	L	GF	GA	GD	Pts	Qualification	KEB	SAI	MB	USC	MSC	ATK
1	East Bengal	10	7	2	1	18	1	+17	23	Advance to final round	—	0–0	0–1	5–0	5–0	2–1
2	SAI (East Zone)	10	6	3	1	19	6	+13	21	Advance to final round	0–1	—	1–1	2–0	1–1	3–2
3	Mohun Bagan	10	6	3	1	16	6	+10	21		0–0	0–3	—	3–0	1–1	2–1
4	United	10	3	0	7	12	21	−9	9		0–1	1–3	0–1	—	0–2	2–1
5	Mohammedan	10	2	2	6	8	23	−15	8		0–3	0–4	0–2	1–4	—	2–1
6	ATK	10	1	0	9	9	25	−16	3		0–1	0–2	0–5	2–5	2–1	—

Source: soccerway

=== Maharashtra zone ===
Pos	Team	Pld	W	D	L	GF	GA	GD	Pts	Qualification	DSK	FCPC	FSI	PIFA	KEN	SF
1	DSK Shivajians	10	9	1	0	44	3	+41	28	Advance to final round	—	1–1	8–0	7–0	4–0	3–0
2	Pune City	10	8	1	1	46	7	+39	25	Advance to final round	1–2	—	4–0	3–2	16–0	4–0
3	Football School of India	10	4	2	4	21	22	−1	14		0–4	0–2	—	7–0	4–0	6–1
4	PIFA	10	3	2	5	15	35	−20	11		0–5	1–8	1–1	—	1–1	3–2
5	Kenkre	10	1	2	7	7	41	−34	5		0–4	1–4	1–2	1–4	—	2–1
6	Steadfast – Mumbai Rush	10	0	2	8	7	32	−25	2		1–6	0–3	1–1	0–3	1–1	—

Source: soccerway

=== Chennai–Karnataka zone ===
Pos	Team	Pld	W	D	L	GF	GA	GD	Pts	Qualification	BFC	OFC	CFC	RVSS	CCFC
1	Bengaluru	8	6	2	0	54	7	+47	20	Advance to final round	—	1–1	2–1	9–1	5–0
2	Ozone	8	5	2	1	29	10	+19	17	Advance to playoffs	0–7	—	1–1	9–0	4–0
3	Chennaiyin	8	4	2	2	27	14	+13	14		2–2	0–3	—	14–5	5–0
4	Raman Vijayan Soccer School	8	2	0	6	17	60	−43	6		2–16	0–6	0–2	—	6–4
5	Chennai City	8	0	0	8	6	42	−36	0		0–12	1–5	1–2	0–3	—

Source: soccerway

=== Shillong–Guwahati zone ===
Pos	Team	Pld	W	D	L	GF	GA	GD	Pts	Qualification	SLFC	RUFC	NEUFC	SAIG
1	Shillong Lajong	6	5	1	0	14	2	+12	16	Advance to final round	—	4–0	2–1	1–0
2	Rangdajied United	6	2	1	3	7	11	−4	7		1–1	—	1–0	2–1
3	NorthEast United	6	2	0	4	8	9	−1	6		0–2	2–1	—	3–0
4	SAI (Guwahati)	6	2	0	4	7	14	−7	6		0–4	3–2	3–2	—

Source: soccerway

=== Goa zone ===
Pos	Team	Pld	W	D	L	GF	GA	GD	Pts	Qualification	FCG	SCG	SFC	DSC	SESA	CBSC
1	Goa	10	5	2	3	17	7	+10	17	Advance to final round	—	0–1	1–1	1–1	0–1	5–1
2	Sporting Goa	10	5	2	3	10	10	0	17	Advance to final round	0–2	—	2–1	0–1	1–0	1–1
3	Salgaocar	10	4	4	2	14	8	+6	16		1–2	0–0	—	1–0	0–0	0–0
4	Dempo	10	4	2	4	12	8	+4	14		0–1	0–1	0–2	—	4–1	2–1
5	SESA	10	3	3	4	10	14	−4	12		1–0	4–2	0–3	0–0	—	1–2
6	Churchill Brothers	10	1	3	6	11	27	−16	6		0–5	1–2	3–5	0–4	2–2	—

Source: soccerway

=== Playoff Qualifiers ===
==== Group A - Rest Of India Zone ====
Pos	Team	Pld	W	D	L	GF	GA	GD	Pts	Qualification	AIZ	TFA	NER	SHO	FH	ASA
1	Aizawl	5	5	0	0	20	1	+19	15	Advance to playoffs	—	2–0	3–0	2–0	5–1	8–0
2	Tata Football Academy	5	4	0	1	10	7	+3	12	Advance to playoffs	—	—	2–1	2–0	3–2	3–2
3	NEROCA	5	3	0	2	12	6	+6	9		—	—	—	4–1	5–0	2–0
4	Sports Hostel Odisha	5	1	1	3	8	11	−3	4		—	—	—	—	3–3	4–0
5	Fateh Hyderabad	5	1	1	3	7	16	−9	4		—	—	—	—	—	1–0
6	Ananthapur Sports Academy	5	0	0	5	2	18	−16	0		—	—	—	—	—	—

Source: soccerway

==== Group B - Punjab/Kashmir/Ladakh Zone ====
All matches played at Minerva Training Ground, Ludhiana.

Pos	Team	Pld	W	D	L	GF	GA	GD	Pts	Qualification	MP	YNG	JK	RK	UP
1	Minerva Punjab	4	4	0	0	12	0	+12	12	Advance to playoffs	—	1–0	6–0	3–0	2–0
2	Youngsters Club	4	3	0	1	8	3	+5	9	Advance to playoffs	—	—	2–0	4–1	2–1
3	J&K State FA	4	1	1	2	2	9	−7	4		—	—	—	1–1	1–0
4	Real Kashmir	4	0	2	2	3	9	−6	2		—	—	—	—	1–1
5	United Punjab FA	4	0	1	3	2	6	−4	1		—	—	—	—	—

Source: soccerway

==== Group C - Gujarat Zone ====
Pos	Team	Pld	W	D	L	GF	GA	GD	Pts	Qualification	SAG	KAH	BFA
1	SAG Football Academy	2	2	0	0	5	2	+3	6	Advance to playoffs	—	3–1	2–1
2	Kahaani FC	2	1	0	1	4	4	0	3		—	—	3–1
3	Baroda Football Academy	2	0	0	2	2	5	−3	0		—	—	—

Source: soccerway

==== Group D - Kerala Zone ====
All matches played at Panampally Ground, Kochi.

Pos	Team	Pld	W	D	L	GF	GA	GD	Pts	Qualification	SAI	KB	MSP	GK	FCK
1	SAI (Thiruvananthapuram)	4	2	1	1	9	3	+6	7	Advance to playoffs	—	1–2	3–0	1–1	4–0
2	Kerala Blasters	4	2	1	1	9	4	+5	7	Advance to playoffs	—	—	1–0	0–0	7–2
3	MSP Football Academy	4	2	1	1	4	5	−1	7		—	–	—	1–1	2–1
4	Gokulam Kerala	4	1	3	0	9	2	+7	6		—	—	—	—	7–0
5	Kerala	4	0	0	4	3	20	−17	0		—	—	—	—	—

Source: soccerway

== Playoffs ==
=== Group A ===
All matches played at Jawaharlal Nehru Stadium (Shillong).

Pos	Team	Pld	W	D	L	GF	GA	GD	Pts	Qualification	AFC	KB	MP	SAG
1	Aizawl	3	2	1	0	9	2	+7	7	Advance to final round	—	2–0	1–1	6–1
2	Kerala Blasters	3	2	0	1	5	3	+2	6	Advance to final round	—	—	2–1	3–0
3	Minerva Punjab	3	0	2	1	3	4	−1	2	Advance to final round	—	—	—	1–1
4	SAG Football Academy	3	0	1	2	2	10	−8	1		—	—	—	—

Source: Soccerway

=== Group B ===
All matches played at MFA Turf, Shillong.

Pos	Team	Pld	W	D	L	GF	GA	GD	Pts	Qualification	SAIT	TFA	OFC	YC
1	SAI (Thiruvananthapuram)	3	3	0	0	8	3	+5	9	Advance to final round	—	3–1	2–1	3–1
2	Tata Football Academy	3	1	1	1	2	3	−1	4	Advance to final round	—	—	1–0	0–0
3	Ozone	3	1	0	2	2	3	−1	3	Advance to final round	—	—	—	1–0
4	Youngsters Club	3	0	1	2	1	4	−3	1		—	—	—	—

Source: soccerway

== Final round ==
=== Group A ===
Pos	Team	Pld	W	D	L	GF	GA	GD	Pts	Qualification	SAIK	TFA	SFC	SCG
1	SAI (Kolkata)	3	2	1	0	5	0	+5	7	Advance to knockout stage	—	0–0	3–0 (Note: SAI (Kolkata) were awarded 3–0 win against Sudeva Moonlight as a result of Sudeva Moonlight fielding the ineligible player Mohit Singh. The match initially ended in a 0–0 draw.)	2–0
2	Tata Football Academy	3	2	1	0	5	1	+4	7		—	—	1–0	4–1
3	Sudeva Moonlight	3	1	0	2	3	5	−2	3		—	—	—	3–1
4	Sporting Goa	3	0	0	3	2	9	−7	0		—	—	—	—

Source: Soccerway

=== Group B ===
Pos	Team	Pld	W	D	L	GF	GA	GD	Pts	Qualification	KEB	SAIT	FCP	MP
1	East Bengal	3	2	1	0	5	0	+5	7	Advance to knockout stage	—	2–0	0–0	3–0
2	SAI (Thiruvananthapuram)	3	2	0	1	4	3	+1	6		—	—	2–0	2–1
3	Pune City	3	0	2	1	1	3	−2	2		—	—	—	1–1
4	Minerva Punjab	3	0	1	2	2	6	−4	1		—	—	—	—

Source: Soccerway

=== Group C ===
Pos	Team	Pld	W	D	L	GF	GA	GD	Pts	Qualification	KBFC	BFC	DSK	BBF
1	Kerala Blasters	3	2	1	0	6	4	+2	7	Advance to knockout stage	—	0–0	3–2	3–2
2	Bengaluru	3	2	1	0	3	1	+2	7		—	—	2–1	1–0
3	DSK Shivajians	3	1	0	2	5	6	−1	3		—	—	—	2–1
4	Bhaichung Bhutia FS	3	0	0	3	3	6	−3	0		—	—	—	—

Source: Soccerway

=== Group D ===
Pos	Team	Pld	W	D	L	GF	GA	GD	Pts	Qualification	SLFC	FCG	AFC	OFC
1	Shillong Lajong	3	3	0	0	5	1	+4	9	Advance to knockout stage	—	2–1	1–0	2–0
2	Goa	3	1	1	1	4	2	+2	4		—	—	3–0	0–0
3	Aizawl	3	1	0	2	3	4	−1	3		—	—	—	2–0
4	Ozone	3	0	1	2	0	4	−4	1		—	—	—	—

Source: Soccerway

== Knockout stage ==
=== Bracket ===
Semi-Finals
Kerala Blasters	2
SAI (Kolkata)	1
East Bengal	0
Shillong Lajong	2

Final
Kerala Blasters	0
Shillong Lajong	2

=== Semi-finals ===
24 May 2018
15:00 IST

Kerala Blasters	2–1	SAI (Kolkata)
Abdullah K S 39', 50'	Report	Injaman Molla 41'

Jawaharlal Nehru Stadium, Shillong
Attendance: 100
Referee: Aditya Purkayastha
24 May 2018
19:00 IST

East Bengal	0–2	Shillong Lajong
	Report	Phrangki Buam 76', 86'

Jawaharlal Nehru Stadium, Shillong
Attendance: 1,750
Referee: Mrutyunjay Amatya

=== Final ===
26 May 2018
13:30 IST

Kerala Blasters	0–2	Shillong Lajong
	Report	Lins P Poulose 4' (o.g.); Khongsit 90+1'

Jawaharlal Nehru Stadium, Shillong
Attendance: 2,000
Referee: Harish Kundu

== Top scorers ==
Rank	Player	Club	Goals
1	Manvir Singh	Ozone	14
2	Joe Massey	Bhaichung Bhutia FS	11
2	Rohit Tigga	SAI (Kolkata)	11
4	Bishnu Bordoloi	DSK Shivajians	9
4	Ishan V Dey	Pune City	9
4	B Rohmingthanga	Chennaiyin	9
7	Rohan Harish Shukla	Football School of India	8
7	Dingku Sharma	DSK Shivajians	8
7	Syed Suhail Pasha	Chennaiyin	8
7	Jhantu Prasad	East Bengal	8
7	Adarsh AS	Kerala Blasters	8
12	Supratip Barui	United	7
12	B Lalnuntluanga	Bengaluru	7
12	Omega Vanlalhruaitluanga	Pune City	7
12	Ragav Gupta	Bengaluru	7
12	Umair Saiyyad	DSK Shivajians	7
12	Yash Sanjay Angre	Bhaichung Bhutia FS	7
12	Shijin T	SAI (Thiruvananthapuram)	7
12	Paul Ramfangzauva	Aizawl	7
12	Phrangki Buam	Shillong Lajong	7
