= 2013 I-League U20 =

- League: 2013 I-League U20
- Sport: Association football
- Duration: 2013
- Teams: 15

I-League U20 season
- Champions: Pune U20
- Top scorer: William Lalnunfela (Pune U20) (7 goals)

I-League U20 seasons
- ← 2012 2014 →

The 2013 I-League U20 was the fifth season of the Indian I-League U20 competition. The season took place during the I-League break between February and March. The tournament began on 6 March in Jamshedpur at the facilities which are currently used by Tata Football Academy. The stadiums were officially announced on 29 January 2013 as the JRD Tata Sports Complex and the Gopal Maidan.

Then on 6 February 2013 it was announced by I-League club Pune F.C. that the I-League U20 would be played between 15 clubs separated into 3 groups of five each with former I-League 2nd Division clubs SESA Football Academy and Tata Football Academy joining the U20 league while Pailan Arrows would not send an under-20 side to the tournament as they are already a developmental side in the I-League.

Each team played each other once in the group stage and then after 4 games the top 2 teams qualified for the Final Round in which the top team was crowned champion. The final round began on 16 March 2013.

== Teams ==
Group A	Group B	Group C
Prayag United U20; Pune U20; Salgaocar U20; Sporting Goa U20; United Sikkim U20	Dempo U20; East Bengal U20; Mumbai U20; ONGC U20; Tata U20	Air India U20; Churchill Brothers U20; Mohun Bagan U20; SESA U20; Shillong Lajong U20

== Group stage ==
=== Group A ===
Team	Pld	W	D	L	GF	GA	GD	Pts	Qualification
Salgaocar U20	4	3	1	0	8	2	+6	10	Final Round
Pune U20	4	3	0	1	15	2	+13	9	Final Round
Prayag United U20	4	1	2	1	4	5	-1	5	
Sporting Goa U20	4	0	2	2	2	7	-5	2	
United Sikkim U20	4	0	1	3	2	15	-13	1	

5 March 2013	Pune U20	2 – 0	Prayag United U20	Gopal Ground, Jamshedpur
	Lalnunfela 60'; Lalrempuia 90+3'	Report

5 March 2013	Sporting Goa U20	1 – 1	United Sikkim U20	JRD Tata Sports Complex, Jamshedpur
	Chopdekar 30'	Report	Tamang 78'

7 March 2013	Salgaocar U20	2 – 1	Pune U20	JRD Tata Sports Complex, Jamshedpur
	Silva 2'; Pereira 4'	Report	Lalnunfela 68'

7 March 2013	Prayag United U20	1 – 1	Sporting Goa U20	Gopal Ground, Jamshedpur
	Barman	Report	Ningthounjam

9 March 2013	Pune U20	3 – 0	Sporting Goa U20	Gopal Ground, Jamshedpur
	Kadam 7'; Bose 27'; Karthik 80'	Report

9 March 2013	United Sikkim U20	0 – 3	Salgaocar U20	Jamshedpur
		Report	Fernandes 24'; Silva 35', 49'

11 March 2013	Prayag United U20	2 – 1	United Sikkim U20	JRD Tata Sports Complex, Jamshedpur
	Bala 8'; Oraow 78'		Tamang 33'

11 March 2013	Salgaocar U20	2 – 0	Sporting Goa U20	JRD Tata Sports Complex, Jamshedpur
	R. Fernandes 53'; M. Fernandes 60'	Report

13 March 2013	United Sikkim U20	0 – 9	Pune U20	Gopal Stadium, Jamshedpur
		Report	Bose 10', 28'; Lalrempuia 19', 25'; Haokip 31'; Laununfela 45+1', 57', 69'; Kadam 54'

13 March 2013	Prayag United U20	1 – 1	Salgaocar U20	Gopal Stadium, Jamshedpur
	Mahato 49'	Report	Fernandes 56'

=== Group B ===
Team	Pld	W	D	L	GF	GA	GD	Pts	Qualification
Tata U20	4	3	1	0	6	1	+5	10	Final Round
East Bengal U20	4	3	1	0	5	1	+4	10	Final Round
Dempo U20	4	2	0	2	5	6	-1	6	
Mumbai U20	4	1	0	3	4	7	-3	3	
ONGC U20	4	0	0	4	3	8	-5	0	

6 March 2013	Mumbai U20	1 – 2	Dempo U20	Jamshedpur
	Paul 52'	Report	Pinto 13'; M. Fernandes 61'

6 March 2013	East Bengal U20	1 – 0	ONGC U20	Jamshedpur
	Das 29'	Report

8 March 2013	Tata U20	2 – 0	Mumbai U20	Jamshedpur
	Sarkar 3', 22'	Report

8 March 2013	Dempo U20	1 – 2	East Bengal U20	Jamshedpur
	A. Fernandes 25'	Report	Murmu 55', 88'

10 March 2013	ONGC U20	1 – 2	Tata U20	JRD Tata Sports Complex, Jamshedpur
	Khan 11'	Report	Singh 74'; Nag 84'

10 March 2013	Mumbai U20	0 – 2	East Bengal U20	JRD Tata Sports Complex, Jamshedpur
		Report	Murmu 29'; Das 68'

12 March 2013	ONGC U20	1 – 2	Dempo U20	Jamshedpur
	Thakur 15'	Report	Pinto 46'; Fernandes 55'

12 March 2013	East Bengal U20	0 – 0	Tata U20	Jamshedpur
		Report

14 March 2013	ONGC U20	1 – 3	Mumbai U20	Jamshedpur
	K 58'	Report	Paul 43', 54', 89'

14 March 2013	Dempo U20	0 – 2	Tata U20	Jamshedpur
		Report	Sarkar; Singh 86'

=== Group C ===
Team	Pld	W	D	L	GF	GA	GD	Pts	Qualification
SESA U20	4	2	2	0	7	3	+4	8	Final Round
Mohun Bagan U20	4	2	1	1	4	3	+1	7	Final Round
Shillong Lajong U20	4	1	3	0	6	4	+2	6	
Churchill Brothers U20	4	0	2	2	3	6	-3	2	
Air India U20	4	0	2	2	3	7	-4	2	

6 March 2013	Shillong Lajong U20	0 – 0	Churchill Brothers U20	Jamshedpur
		Report

6 March 2013	Air India U20	0 – 2	Mohun Bagan U20	Jamshedpur
		Report	Kaping 50'; Roy 82'

8 March 2013	Sesa U20	1 – 1	Shillong Lajong U20	Jamshedpur
	D'Souza 46'	Report	Lalruatfela 76'

8 March 2013	Churchill Brothers U20	1 – 1	Air India U20	Jamshedpur
	Sawant 50'	Report	Unknown

10 March 2013	Mohun Bagan U20	0 – 0	Sesa U20	Gopal Maidan, Jamshedpur
		Report

10 March 2013	Shillong Lajong U20	2 – 2	Air India U20	Gopal Maidan, Jamshedpur
	Singh 36'; Lalrammuana 77'	Report	Khokyar 6', 12'

12 March 2013	Mohun Bagan U20	1 – 0	Churchill Brothers U20	Jamshedpur
	Roy 51'	Report

12 March 2013	Air India U20	0 – 2	Sesa U20	Jamshedpur
		Report	Borges 50'; Cardozo 86'

14 March 2013	Mohun Bagan U20	1 – 3	Shillong Lajong U20	JRD Tata Sports Complex, Jamshedpur
	Roy 25'	Report	Liana 44'; Munna 50', 64'

14 March 2013	Churchill Brothers U20	2 – 4	Sesa U20	Jamshedpur
	R. Fernandes 18'; Singh 90'	Report	Cardozo 10', 26'; Colaco 80', 83'

== Final round ==
Team	Pld	W	D	L	GF	GA	GD	Pts	Champions
Pune U20	5	4	1	0	10	3	+7	13	Champions
Tata U20	5	3	2	0	8	4	+4	11	
Sesa U20	5	2	1	2	8	6	+2	7	
Salgaocar U20	5	1	2	2	6	8	-2	5	
Mohun Bagan U20	5	1	1	3	6	8	-2	4	
East Bengal U20	5	0	1	4	2	11	-9	1	

16 March 2013	Salgaocar U20	1 – 1	Mohun Bagan U20	Jamshedpur
	Pereira 33'	Report	Kaping 85'

16 March 2013	Pune U20	2 – 1	Sesa U20	JRD Tata Sports Complex, Jamshedpur
	Bose 9'; Haokip 31'	Report	D'Souza 3'

16 March 2013	Tata U20	1 – 1	East Bengal U20	Jamshedpur
	Udant 90'	Report	Somnath 24'

18 March 2013	Salgaocar U20	2 – 3	Pune U20	Gopal Stadium, Jamshedpur
	Pereira 44'; Fernandes 85'	Report	Lalnunfela 22', 50'; Kadam 60'

18 March 2013	Sesa U20	1 – 2	Tata U20	Jamshedpur
	Borges 66'	Report	Singh 76' (pen.); Das 83'

18 March 2013	Mohun Bagan U20	2 – 0	East Bengal U20	Jamshedpur
	Roy; Pradhan	Report

20 March 2013	East Bengal U20	0 – 3	Sesa U20	Jamshedpur
		Report	Cardozo 32'; Borgez 64', 74'

20 March 2013	Pune U20	2 – 0	Mohun Bagan U20	JRD Tata Sports Complex, Jamshedpur
	Singh (o.g.); Kadam 32'	Report

20 March 2013	Tata U20	2 – 0	Salgaocar U20	Jamshedpur
	U. Singh; J. Singh	Report; Report (Hindi)

22 March 2013	Mohun Bagan U20	1 – 2	Sesa U20	Jamshedpur
	Tamang 88'		Cardozo 25'; Borges 45' (pen.)

22 March 2013	Salgaocar U20	2 – 1	East Bengal U20	Jamshedpur
	Silva 42'; Pereira 86'		Chatterjee 88'

22 March 2013	Pune U20	0 – 0	Tata U20	Gopal Stadium, Jamshedpur

24 March 2013	Tata U20	3 – 2	Mohun Bagan U20	Jamshedpur
	Sardar 31', 53'; Singh 89'	Report	Marandi 33'

24 March 2013	East Bengal U20	0 – 3	Pune U20	JRD Tata Sports Complex, Jamshedpur
		Report	Monsang 38', 53'; Lalrempuia 89'

24 March 2013	Sesa U20	1 – 1	Salgaocar U20	Jamshedpur
	Vaz 55'	Report	Silva 19'

== Top scorers ==
=== Final round ===
Total	Player		Club	Goals per Game				
Total	Player		Club	1	2	3	4	5
4	(India)	Mauvin Borges	Sesa U20		1	2	1	
4	(India)	Udanta Singh	Tata U20	1	1	1		1
3	(India)	Albino Pereira	Salgaocar U20	1	1		1	
2	(India)	William Lalnunfela	Pune U20		2			
2	(India)	Nikhil Kadam	Pune U20		1	1		
2	(India)	Olivin Cardozo	Sesa U20			1	1	
2	(India)	Biswajit Sardar	Tata U20					2
2	(India)	Godfrey Silva	Salgaocar U20				1	1
2	(India)	Henry Monsang	Pune U20					2
1	(India)	Subhasish Bose	Pune U20	1				
1	(India)	Thongkhosiem Haokip	Pune U20	1				
1	(India)	George D'Souza	Sesa U20	1				
1	(India)	Mayon Kaping	Mohun Bagan U20	1				
1	(India)	Somnath	East Bengal U20	1				
1	(India)	Melwin Fernandes	Salgaocar U20		1			
1	(India)	Baidyanath Das	Tata U20		1			
1	(India)	Prohlad Roy	Mohun Bagan U20		1			
1	(India)	Dipankar Pradhan	Mohun Bagan U20		1			
1	(India)	Jarman Jeet Singh	Tata U20			1		
1	(India)	Adarsh Lama Tamang	Mohun Bagan U20				1	
1	(India)	Anirban Chatterjee	East Bengal U20				1	
1	(India)	Gorachand Marandi	Mohun Bagan U20					1
1	(India)	Jaison Vaz	Sesa U20					1
1	(India)	Fanai Lalrempuia	Pune U20					1

=== Group stage ===
Total	Player		Club	Goals per Game				
Total	Player		Club	1	2	3	4	5
5	(India)	William Lalnunfela	Pune U20	1	1		X	3
4	(India)	Cletus Paul	Mumbai U20	1			X	3
3	(India)	Jiten Murmu	East Bengal U20		2	1		X
3	(India)	Subasish Bose	Pune U20			1	X	2
3	(India)	Fanai Lalrempuia	Pune U20	1			X	2
3	(India)	Lalram Muana	Shillong Lajong U20			1	X	2
3	(India)	Prohlad Roy	Mohun Bagan U20	1	X		1	1
3	(India)	Godfrey Silva	Salgaocar U20	X	1	2		
3	(India)	Olvin Cardozo	Sesa U20	X			1	2
3	(India)	Manash Sarkar	Tata U20	X	2			1
2	(India)	Biswajit Das	East Bengal U20	1		1		X
2	(India)	Yungrei Khokyar	Air India U20			2		X
2	(India)	Nikhil Kadam	Pune U20			1	X	1
2	(India)	Clencio Pinto	Dempo U20	1		X	1	
2	(India)	Myron Fernandes	Dempo U20	1		X	1	
2	(India)	Robin Tamang	United Sikkim U20	1	X		1	
2	(India)	Rayman Fernandes	Salgaocar U20	X		1	1	
2	(India)	Stephen Colaco	Sesa U20	X				2
2	(India)	Udanta Singh	Tata U20	X		1		1
1	(India)	Pandhari Chopdekar	Sporting Goa U20	1				X
1	(India)	Pritam Ningthounjam	Sporting Goa U20		1			X
1	(India)	G Karthick	Pune U20			1	X	
1	(India)	Thongkhosiem Haokip	Pune U20				X	1
1	(India)	Lalruatfela	Shillong Lajong U20		1		X	
1	(India)	Bipin Singh	Shillong Lajong U20			1	X	
1	(India)	Zoding Liana	Shillong Lajong U20				X	1
1	(India)	Rajon Barman	Prayag United U20		1	X		
1	(India)	Bidhan Bala	Prayag United U20			X	1	
1	(India)	Jagannath Oraow	Prayag United U20			X	1	
1	(India)	Amit Mahato	Prayag United U20			X		1
1	(India)	Aniston Fernandes	Dempo U20		1	X		
1	(India)	Alesh Sawant	Churchill Brothers U20		1	X		
1	(India)	Romario Fernandes	Churchill Brothers U20			X		1
1	(India)	Satish Singh	Churchill Brothers U20			X		1
1	(India)	Mayon Kaping	Mohun Bagan U20	1	X			
1	(India)	Kamaluddin Khan	ONGC U20		X	1		
1	(India)	Pawan Thakur	ONGC U20		X		1	
1	(India)	Prudhuvi K	ONGC U20		X			1
1	(India)	Albino Pereira	Salgaocar U20	X	1			
1	(India)	Mario Fernandes	Salgaocar U20	X			1	
1	(India)	Melwin Fernandes	Salgaocar U20	X				1
1	(India)	George D'Souza	Sesa U20	X	1			
1	(India)	Mauvin Borges	Sesa U20	X			1	
1	(India)	Rajak Nag	Tata U20	X		1		

Player's team did not have a game in this round.

- The goalscorer during the Churchill Brothers - Air India match for Air India is not officially known yet.

== See also ==
- I-League
