= Thongkhosiem Haokip =

Indian footballer (born 1993)

Personal information
- Date of birth: 13 March 1993 (age 33)
- Place of birth: Gangpijang, Manipur, India
- Height: 1.83 m (6 ft 0 in)
- Position: Forward

Team information
- Current team: Jamshedpur
- Number: 19

Youth career
- United Sports Association
- 2011–2013: Pune

Senior career*
Years	Team	Apps	(Gls)
2013–2016	Pune	36	(11)
2015	→ Goa (loan)	6	(4)
2016	→ Salgaocar (loan)	12	(2)
2016	Kerala Blasters	1	(0)
2017	→ East Bengal (loan)	8	(1)
2017–2021	Bengaluru	28	(2)
2021–2023	East Bengal	27	(3)
2023–	Jamshedpur	7	(0)

International career^{‡}
2014	India U23	3	(0)
- * Club domestic league appearances and goals as of 15:33, 4 April 2024 (UTC) ‡ National team caps and goals as of 27 March 2020

Thongkosiem Haokip (born 13 March 1993), commonly known as Semboi, is an Indian professional footballer who plays as a forward.

== Career ==
=== Early career ===
Born in the village of Gangpijang in Manipur, Haokip began playing football for his state side at the youth levels in the national school games. He then joined local side United Sports Association in Khurai. He stayed with the side until he was spotted by Pune. He joined the Pune F.C. Academy in 2011 and played for the side in the I-League U20 and other tournaments. While part of the academy set-up at Pune, Haokip helped his side to two consecutive I-League U20 titles, in 2012 and 2013.

=== Pune ===
==== 2013–14 season ====
Before the start of the 2013–14 I-League season, it was announced that Haokip would be promoted to the Pune first-team. He made his professional debut for the club on 29 September 2013, appearing as a late-match substitute during a 0–0 draw against Shillong Lajong. Then, in the very next match, against Mohun Bagan, Haokip scored his first professional goal. His 72nd-minute goal opened the scoring for Pune as the club went on to win 2–0. His goal made him only the second ever Pune Academy player to score for the senior team after Nikhil Kadam. After scoring, Haokip gave credit to the Pune head coach, Mike Snoei, for motivating him: "The coach simply says; 'play aggressively, be strong and be confident in what I do when out on the field. He also told me 'don't worry'. I am a learner."

Haokip scored the second goal of his career in the return fixture against Mohun Bagan on 21 December 2013. His 79th-minute goal being the sole goal for his side as Pune lost 3–1. Haokip then made his international club debut on 29 January 2014 in a qualifying match for the AFC Champions League against Vietnamese side Hanoi T&T. He came on as a 74th-minute substitute for Arata Izumi as Pune lost the qualifier 3–0. Two weeks later, Haokip scored goals in back-to-back matches against Sporting Goa and Mohammedan. He then scored his final goal of the season on 8 April 2014 in an AFC Cup match against Nay Pyi Taw of Myanmar. The match ended 3–3.

==== 2014–15 season ====
Haokip began the 2014–15 season by participating in the Durand Cup with Pune. Haokip found the net early, scoring in Pune's first match in the cup against former I-League side Churchill Brothers. His 65th-minute strike helped Pune to a 3–0 opening victory. The next month, during a match against Assam State Electricity Board in a Bhutan King's Cup pre-season tournament, Haokip scored a hat-trick as Pune booked their place into the semi-finals with a 5–0 victory.

Haokip was then part of the 20–member Pune squad that would participate in the Federation Cup. Haokip only managed to find the net once during the Federation Cup, on 5 January 2015 against Bengaluru FC. Pune were thus knocked-out early from the competition. After the Federation Cup, the club returned to I-League play and on 24 January 2015 Haokip scored his first goal of the I-League season, against the reigning champions Bengaluru FC. His goal helped further increase Pune's lead as they ran out 3–1 winners over the trophy holders.

In the next match, Haokip managed to score the first hat-trick of the I-League season against Shillong Lajong. His first goal came in only the second minute of the match and his third came in the 15th minute, making the hat-trick take only 13 minutes to be complete. Haokip then continued his good form with a goal against Sporting Goa on 21 February 2015 and then another goal in the next match against Royal Wahingdoh. His goal against Royal Wahingdoh was the only one during the match and thus propelled Pune to the top of the I-League table. Haokip then scored his seventh and final goal of the season against East Bengal on 17 May 2015. His 65th-minute goal was the winning goal for Pune as they won 2–1.

Haokip went on to finish the 2014–15 season as the top scorer among all Indians with seven goals. In late September 2015, after his performance the previous season, Haokip was nominated for the FPAI Young Player of the Season award. A few days later it was announced that he had won the award.

==== Goa (loan) ====
On 10 July 2015, Haokip was drafted by Goa for the 2015 Indian Super League. Despite his performance in the I-League the previous season, Haokip was nervous about not being selected in the draft: "At that time, I told myself, 'if I get picked up, it's good, if not I will have to work even harder.' Sometimes, I got this feeling that I won't be picked. There are many Indian and foreign players in the strikers position."

Haokip did not make his debut for the side until 30 October 2015, when injuries forced head coach Zico's hand, against Pune City. Despite being forced into the line-up, Haokip managed to play the full match as Goa drew with Pune City 1–1. A few weeks later, on 17 November, Haokip made history in the league when he became on the second Indian in ISL history to score a hattrick. His three goals came against Mumbai City as Goa bulldozed the Maharashtra side 7–0. Following the hattrick and subsequent victory, Zico was full of praise for Haokip: "Haokip is a player who has a good technique and is very smart to play with. You can see the way he passes the ball and controls it during the game. He always wants to learn. He trains more than his team mates and is very receptive to information."

Haokip then contributed greatly for Goa during the 2015 Indian Super League final against Chennaiyin. He scored the equalizer for the team in 58th minute to tie the match at 1–1 and despite eventually taking the lead 2–1, Goa fell through two late goals to lose 3–2.

==== Salgaocar (loan) ====
After the 2015 ISL season, Haokip signed on loan with Salgaocar from Pune, after the Maharashtra club themselves withdrew from the I-League. He made his debut for the club on 16 January 2016 against Mohun Bagan. He came on as a 34th-minute substitute for Alesh Sawant but then came off himself in the 78th minute for Manandeep Singh as Salgaocar lost 4–2. He scored his only two goals of the season on 1 March 2016 against East Bengal. His 4th and 95th-minute strikes were enough to secure a 3–1 victory for Salgaocar.

=== Kerala Blasters ===
On 7 July 2016, it was announced that Haokip had signed with Kerala Blasters of the Indian Super League.

==== East Bengal (loan) ====
Semboi was loaned to East Bengal from Kerala Blasters for the 2016–17 where he played eight times, scoring once.

=== Bengaluru ===
On 24 July 2017, Haokip was drafted by Indian Super League debutantes Bengaluru. He made his debut for bengaluru fc in their 2018 AFC Cup preliminary round match against Transport United.He came as 76th-minute substitute for Daniel Lalhlimpuia.He started for bengaluru in the home leg of Preliminary round and scored his first goal for the club in 62nd minute. Bengaluru won the match 3-0 and qualified for the 2018 AFC Cup qualifying play-offs. He made his ISL debut for the club in a 2–0 home win against FC Goa.

Haokip played a key role in a season where Roca rotated his squad heavily owing the fixture pile up. Playing nine games in the Asian campaign of 2018, Haokip struck a total of three goals in the qualifying stages, which included a match winning brace in the play-off stage game against TC Sports Club from Maldives as Bengaluru booked a berth in the group stages of the competition.

On 29 May 2018 He extended his contract with Bengaluru fc for two more years. which will keep him with bfc till the end of 2020 season.

On 12 February 2020 He became the first Bengaluru FC player to score 4 goals in AFC Cup.

=== Return to East Bengal ===
On 7 September 2021, East Bengal announced Hoakip's return to the club on a one-year deal, ahead of the 2021–22 Indian Super League. On 30 November, he scored his first goal from a header against Odisha FC but lost the game by 6–4. On 4 January 2022, Haokip scored his second goal for the club in a 1–1 draw against Bengaluru. On 30 August 2022, East Bengal announced the extension of contract with Haokip for the 2022–23 season.

== International ==
In July 2014, it was announced that Haokip had been called up to the India under-23 30-man squad to participate in a preparatory camp for the 2014 Asian Games in South Korea. He made his official international debut for the under-23 side on 20 August 2014 during a friendly against Pakistan. He could not help the team as India U23 fell 2–0 to their rivals. Despite not showing much against Pakistan, Haokip managed to make it into the final squad for the Asian Games. Haokip did not make an appearance during the tournament, however, staying on the bench in both matches against the United Arab Emirates and Jordan.

== Career statistics ==
As of 9 December 2022

Club	Season	League			Federation Cup/Super Cup		Durand Cup		Continental		Total	
Club	Season	Division	Apps	Goals	Apps	Goals	Apps	Goals	Apps	Goals	Apps	Goals
Pune	2013–14	I-League	18	4	0	0	0	0	6	1	24	5
Pune	2014–15	I-League	18	7	3	1	1	1	—	—	22	9
Pune	Pune Total		36	11	3	1	1	1	6	1	46	14
Goa (loan)	2015	Indian Super League	6	4	—	—	—	—	—	—	6	4
Salgaocar (loan)	2015–16	I-League	12	2	0	0	—	—	0	0	12	2
Kerala Blasters	2016	Indian Super League	1	0	0	0	—	—	—	—	1	0
East Bengal (loan)	2016–17	I-League	8	1	0	0	—	—	—	—	8	1
Bengaluru	2017–18	Indian Super League	2	0	0	0	—	—	8	3	10	3
Bengaluru	2018–19	Indian Super League	7	1	0	0	—	—	2	0	9	1
Bengaluru	2019–20	Indian Super League	14	1	0	0	—	—	3	5	17	6
Bengaluru	2020–21	Indian Super League	5	0	0	0	—	—	—	—	5	0
Bengaluru	Bengaluru Total		28	2	0	0	0	0	13	8	45	10
East Bengal	2021–22	Indian Super League	12	2	—	—	—	—	—	—	12	2
East Bengal	2022–23	Indian Super League	9	1	0	0	1	0	—	—	10	1
Career total			112	23	3	1	2	1	19	9	136	34

== Honours ==
FC Goa

- Indian Super League: runner-up 2018–19

Bengaluru

- Indian Super League: 2018–19

Kerala Blasters

- Indian Super League: runner-up 2016

Individual

- FPAI Young Player of the Year: 2015
