= David Lalbiakzara =

Indian footballer (born 1994)

Personal information
- Full name: David Lalbiakzara
- Date of birth: 12 October 1994 (age 32)
- Place of birth: Champhai, Mizoram, India
- Height: 1.72 m (5 ft 8 in)
- Positions: Winger; centre midfielder

Youth career
- 2009: Shillong Lajong F.C.
- 2010: Mohun Bagan
- 2011: Pune F.C.

Senior career*
Years	Team	Apps	(Gls)
2012	Pune F.C.	0	(0)
2013	Rangdajied United F.C.	1	(0)
2014–16	DSK Shivajians F.C.	5	(0)
2016–18	NEROCA	14	(2)
2018-19	Aizawl F.C.		
2018-19	South United F.C. (On Loan)		
2022	Guwahati Town Club		
- * Club domestic league appearances and goals

David Lalbiakzara (born 12 October 1994) is an Indian footballer who recently played for NEROCA in the I-League.

== Club career ==
=== Early years ===
Born in Champhai, Mizoram, David's talent was unearth by the neighbour state, Shillong's premier club Shillong Lajong F.C. where he joined as an Youth Player. Upon impressing in the youth rank tournaments, David was invited & brought on to Mohun Bagan as a full-time Academy player.

=== Mohun Bagan A.C. ===
David was one of the few Academy members to be inherited to the senior side of Mohun Bagan A.C. for the 2010/11, Calcutta Football League where he played two matches as a substitute before switching sides to the rival club, Pune F.C.

=== Pune F.C. ===
David was offered a role of both U19 & senior squad membership. Although he was used as a sporadic team member in the senior level for zonal tournaments but he did win the 2012 I-League U20 with Pune F.C. in its inception season & was named the U19 Player of the Year, 2010/11. Unable to breakthrough for regular appearances into the senior side, he left the club in 2013 for Rangdajied United F.C.

=== Rangdajied United F.C. ===
David found a limited role in a star-studded Rangdjied United team in their inaugural run in the I-League & was only left with one single substitute appearance in the I-League.

=== DSK Shivajians F.C. ===
Biakzara did find success in DSK Shivajians F.C. where he was reunited with former Pune F.C. Coach, Derrick Pereira, he was one of their consistent performers in the DSK Cup. After impressing at DSK Shivajians F.C., he was offered a first-team role at NEROCA.

=== NEROCA ===
==== 2016/17 ====
Biakzara's most fruitful taste in the senior level football was found at NEROCA. He went on a spree to win the Durand Cup 2016 beating Aizawl F.C. in the finals. He was one of the penalty takers in the finals & found the net twice in the tournament. He then tasted success in the I-League 2nd Division, 2017 where he played an important role scoring against both Southern Samity & Delhi United S.C. in the preliminary round. He was offered a one-year extension by the I-League 2nd Division champions.

==== 2017/18 ====
David was used as a substitute in the I-League matches. He assisted the winner versus his home-town side, Aizawl F.C. providing a cross at the near-post from the left. He was also drafted as a squad role player in the Super Cup, 2018.

== International career ==
He was in the preliminary squad of India national under-23 football team for the 2012/13 AFC Cup Qualifiers.
