= Udanta Singh Kumam =

Indian footballer (born 1996)

Udanta Singh
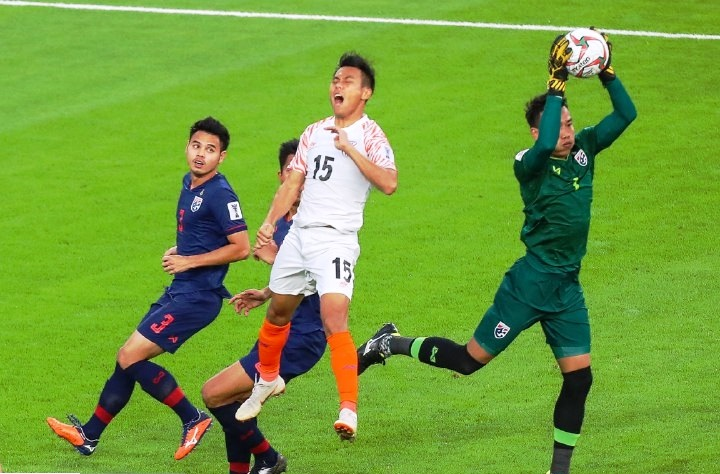
- Udanta (middle) trying a header during 2019 AFC Asian Cup group match against Thailand

Personal information
- Full name: Udanta Singh Kumam
- Date of birth: 14 June 1996 (age 30)
- Place of birth: Moirang, Manipur, India
- Height: 1.70 m (5 ft 7 in)
- Position: Winger

Team information
- Current team: Goa
- Number: 21

Youth career
- 2010–2014: Tata Football Academy

Senior career*
Years	Team	Apps	(Gls)
2014–2023	Bengaluru	147	(15)
2016	→ Mumbai City (loan)	1	(0)
2023–	Goa	36	(4)

International career^{‡}
2013–2016	India U19	4	(1)
2016	India U23	4	(3)
2016–	India	55	(3)
Medal record
Men's football
Representing India
SAFF Championship
Winner	2021 Maldives
Winner	2023 India
CAFA Nations Cup
Third place	2025 Tajikistan–Uzbekistan	Team
- * Club domestic league appearances and goals as of 16:23, 7 January 2024 (UTC) ‡ National team caps and goals as of 21:30, 14 October 2025 (UTC)

Udanta Singh Kumam (Meitei: Kumam Udanta Singh, born 14 June 1996) is an Indian professional footballer who plays as a winger for Indian Super League club Goa and the India national team.

== Club career ==
=== Early career ===
Born in Moirang, Manipur, Singh started his youth career at the Tata Football Academy. While at TFA, Singh shined at the academy during the Darjeeling Gold Cup, Saras Gold Cup, and the I-League U19 in 2014. He also represented the state of Jharkhand during the 2011 National Games of India. Singh also represented India during the Nike All Asia Camp in Australia, which he, and his teammate Alen Deory, were selected for the All-Star team. Singh left Tata Football Academy, after helping his side win the 2014 I-League U19, and in the process, he became the golden-boot winner with his nine goals during the tournament.

=== Bengaluru ===
On 15 July 2014 it was announced that Singh had signed a professional contract with Bengaluru the reigning champions of the I-League, the topmost professional league in India. He made his debut for the side during the Durand Cup on 30 October 2014 against Mohammedan. He came off the bench for the start of the second half and played the full half as Bengaluru FC won the match 2–1. He then made his professional debut during the same tournament at the semi-final stage when Bengaluru FC took on Salgaocar. He once again came off the bench and scored his penalty during the penalty shoot-out but could not help his teams cause as Bengaluru FC fell on penalties 4–5. Udanta made his I-League debut in a 4–1 win against Sporting Goa on 31 March 2015, coming on as a substitute for Sean Rooney. Udanta assisted skipper Sunil Chhetri for the winner in an AFC Cup group stage game against Maldivian side Maziya on 28 April 2015, thus becoming the youngest Indian player to provide an assist in AFC competitions. He scored his first goal for Bengaluru on 12 May 2015 in an AFC Cup game, where he opened the scoring in an eventual 3–1 defeat to Persipura Jayapura, thus becoming the youngest Indian goal scorer in AFC Cup.

After the season ended, Singh was rewarded with a two-year contract extension. Udanta was excluded from the 2015 Indian Super League draft by Bengaluru FC, opting to send him on a training stint at English club Oxford United in the EFL League 2.

Udanta scored his first I-League goal of the 2015–16 season on 2 March 2016 against Shillong Lajong, in a game where he was adjudged the man of the match.

In the first league game of the 2016–17 season Udanta scored twice as Bengaluru beat Shillong Lajong 3–0. Afterwards Udanta was named man of the match with his second goals being described as a "beautiful volley." He was also named as player of the week by a newspaper for his performance in that match.

Udanta scored a goal and assisted 7 times for Bengaluru during the 2017–18 Indian Super League season during which his team finished as runners-up. He also was a regular for his team during the AFC Cup where he scored once. For the 2018–19 ISL season, Singh scored 5 times and assisted thrice as his team ran out champions of the tournament. He scored a goal in the 2018 AFC Cup as well.

== International career ==
Udanta was selected to join the India U19 team in 2013 for the AFC U-19 Championship qualification where he started all 4 of India's matches, scoring once against Turkmenistan U19s. Udanta had his senior debut on 24 March 2016 in a qualifying match against Iran.

On 1 June 2018, he scored his first goal in India's 5–0 victory over Chinese Taipei.

== Career statistics ==
=== Club ===
As of 19 March 2023

Club	Season	League			Cup		AFC		Total	
Club	Season	Division	Apps	Goals	Apps	Goals	Apps	Goals	Apps	Goals
Bengaluru	2014–15	I-League	10	0	0	0	3	1	13	1
Bengaluru	2015–16	I-League	12	1	2	0	7	0	21	1
Bengaluru	2016–17	I-League	17	3	5	1	6	0	28	4
Bengaluru	2017–18	Indian Super League	19	1	4	1	9	2	32	4
Bengaluru	2018–19	Indian Super League	19	5	1	0	2	0	21	5
Bengaluru	2019–20	Indian Super League	19	1	0	0	3	0	22	1
Bengaluru	2020–21	Indian Super League	17	1	0	0	1	0	18	1
Bengaluru	2021–22	Indian Super League	17	3	0	0	3	1	20	4
Bengaluru	2022–23	Indian Super League	17	0	10	1	0	0	27	1
Bengaluru	Total		147	15	22	3	34	4	203	22
Mumbai City (loan)	2016	Indian Super League	1	0	–	–	–	–	1	0
Career total			148	15	22	3	34	4	204	22

=== International ===
As of 14 October 2025

National team	Year	Apps	Goals
India	2016	4	0
India	2017	4	0
India	2018	7	1
India	2019	12	0
India	2021	7	0
India	2022	5	0
India	2023	9	1
India	2024	2	0
India	2025	5	1
Total		55	3

==== International goals ====
India score listed first, score column indicates score after each Udanta goal.

List of international goals scored by Udanta Singh Kumam
No.	Date	Venue	Cap	Opponent	Score	Result	Competition	Ref.
1	1 June 2018	Mumbai Football Arena, Mumbai, India	10	Chinese Taipei	3–0	5–0	2018 Intercontinental Cup	
2	21 June 2023	Sree Kanteerava Stadium, Bengaluru, India	42	Pakistan	4–0	4–0	2023 SAFF Championship	
3	8 September 2025	Hisor Central Stadium, Hisor, Tajikistan	53	Oman	1–1	1–1 (3–2 p)	2025 CAFA Nations Cup	

== Honours ==
India

- SAFF Championship: 2021
- Intercontinental Cup: 2018, 2023
- King's Cup third place: 2019

India U23

- South Asian Games silver medal: 2016

Tata Football Academy

- I-League U19: 2014

Bengaluru

- Federation Cup: 2014–15, 2016–17
- I-League: 2015–16
- AFC Cup runner-up: 2016
- Super Cup: 2018
- Indian Super League: 2018–19
- Durand Cup: 2022

Individual

- Tata Football Academy Best Gentleman Cadet
- FPAI Young Player of the Year: 2015–16
