= 2008 I-League U19 =

- Champions: Tata Football Academy
- Highest scoring: Salgaocar FC 1-5 Mohun Bagan SAIL (Group Stage)

The 2008 I-League U19 was the first edition of the I-League U19 as replacement for the National Football League (Under-19) which was folded before.

The tournament was held in September 2008 in Jamshedpur, Jharkhand with the I-League and I-League 2nd Division youth teams and academies.

All teams played the other teams in their group once and the group winners (4 group winners) and second placed (4 second placed) play in the quarterfinals. The winner qualifies for the semifinals and its winners play in the final. The Tata Football Academy won the first edition of the youth league.

== Group stage ==
The 16 participating teams were divided into four groups and played against each other. The group winner and the second placed made it to the next round.

=== Group A ===
| Team | Pld | W | D | L | GF | GA | GD | Pts |
|---|---|---|---|---|---|---|---|---|
| Mahindra United | 3 | 2 | 0 | 1 | 10 | 4 | +6 | 6 |
| SESA | 3 | 2 | 0 | 1 | 6 | 6 | 0 | 6 |
| Mohammedan | 3 | 1 | 1 | 1 | 4 | 4 | 0 | 4 |
| Vasco | 3 | 0 | 1 | 2 | 2 | 8 | −6 | 1 |

=== Group B ===
| Team | Pld | W | D | L | GF | GA | GD | Pts |
|---|---|---|---|---|---|---|---|---|
| Dempo | 3 | 2 | 1 | 0 | 6 | 2 | +4 | 7 |
| Sporting Clube de Goa | 3 | 1 | 1 | 1 | 4 | 3 | +1 | 4 |
| Chirag United | 3 | 1 | 0 | 2 | 3 | 6 | -3 | 3 |
| Pune | 3 | 0 | 2 | 1 | 2 | 4 | −2 | 2 |

=== Group C ===
| Team | Pld | W | D | L | GF | GA | GD | Pts |
|---|---|---|---|---|---|---|---|---|
| Tata | 3 | 3 | 0 | 0 | 10 | 0 | +10 | 9 |
| East Bengal | 3 | 2 | 0 | 1 | 5 | 6 | -6 | 6 |
| Mumbai | 3 | 1 | 0 | 2 | 3 | 6 | -3 | 3 |
| Churchill Brothers | 3 | 0 | 0 | 3 | 1 | 7 | −6 | 0 |

=== Group D ===
| Team | Pld | W | D | L | GF | GA | GD | Pts |
|---|---|---|---|---|---|---|---|---|
| Mohun Bagan SAIL | 3 | 3 | 0 | 0 | 8 | 2 | +6 | 9 |
| JCT | 3 | 1 | 1 | 1 | 3 | 3 | 0 | 4 |
| Salgaocar FC | 3 | 1 | 0 | 2 | 4 | 8 | -4 | 3 |
| Air India | 3 | 0 | 1 | 2 | 1 | 3 | −2 | 1 |

== Final round ==
=== Quarterfinals ===
14 September 2008

| Mahindra United | 1-2 | Sporting Clube de Goa |

14 September 2008

| Dempo | 2-1 | SESA |

15 September 2008

| Tata | 4-1 | JCT |

15 September 2008

| Mohun Bagan SAIL | 2-1 | East Bengal |

=== Semifinals ===
17 September 2008

| Sporting Clube de Goa | 3-2 | Dempo |

18 September 2008

| Tata | 1-1 (a.e.t.) | Mohun Bagan SAIL |
Penalties
| | 7-6 |

=== Finals ===
19 September 2008

| Sporting Clube de Goa | 1-3 | Tata |
|---|---|---|
| Roy Colaco 68' | | Jagdeep Singh 8'; Niroshan Mani 53'; Jagtar Singh 77' |
