= 2014–15 I-League U19 =

I-League U19
- Season: 2014–15
- Champions: AIFF Elite Academy
- Top goalscorer: Chhangte Lallianzuala (DSK Shivajians)
- All statistics correct as of 10 May 2015.

The 2014–15 I-League U19 is the seventh season of the Indian I-League U19 competition. The season began on 13 December 2014 and concluded on 6 May 2015. AIFF Elite Academy won the trophy for the first time.

== Teams ==
Group A – Kolkata	Group B – Goa	Group C – Maharashtra	Group D – Rest of India	
East Bengal U19; Mohammedan U19; Mohun Bagan U19; United U19	AIFF Elite Academy; Dempo U19; Salgaocar U19; SESA FA U19; Sporting Goa U19	DSK Shivajians U19; Kenkre U19; Mumbai U19; PIFA U19; Pune U19	Zone A: Bengaluru U19; Hindustan U19; Lonestar Kashmir U19; Tata FA U19	Zone B: Aizawl U19; Chanmari U19; Royal Wahingdoh U19; Shilong Lajong U19

== Group A – Kolkata ==
=== Table ===
Team	Pld	W	D	L	GF	GA	GD	Pts	Qualification
United U19	6	3	3	0	12	5	+7	12	Final Round
Mohun Bagan U19	6	3	2	1	6	4	+2	11	Final Round
East Bengal U19	6	2	2	2	4	3	+1	8	
Mohammedan U19	6	0	1	5	3	13	−10	1	

=== Fixtures and Results ===
13 December 2014	United U19	2–1	Mohun Bagan U19	Kalyani
14:00 IST	Babun Das 67'; Sandip Bhattacharjee 90+4'	Report	Rohit Negi 66'	Stadium: Kalyani Stadium

14 December 2014	East Bengal U19	2–0	Mohammedan U19	Kolkata
14:15 IST	Budhwa Bara 41'; Soumen Majumder 67'	Report		Stadium: East Bengal Ground

18 December 2014	Mohammedan U19	1–1	United U19	Kolkata
14:00 IST	Sujoy Mondal 90'	Report	Babun Das 67'	Stadium: Rajpur-Sonarpur Ground

19 December 2014	East Bengal U19	0–0	Mohun Bagan U19	Kolkata
14:15 IST		Report		Stadium: East Bengal Ground

23 December 2014	United U19	1–0	East Bengal U19	Kalyani
14:00 IST	Abdul Sajat 77'	Report		Stadium: Kalyani Stadium

24 December 2014	Mohammedan U19	1–2	Mohun Bagan U19	Kolkata
14:00 IST	Diptanu Das 18'	Report	Adarsh Tamang 17'; Pintu Mahata 84'	Stadium: Rajpur-Sonarpur Ground

28 December 2014	Mohammedan U19	0–1	East Bengal U19	Kolkata
14:00 IST		Report	Soumen Majumder 18'	Stadium: Rajpur-Sonarpur Ground

29 December 2014	Mohun Bagan U19	1–1	United U19	Kolkata
14:15 IST	Pintu Mahata 15'	Report	Babun Das 90+2'	Stadium: Mohun Bagan Ground

2 January 2015	Mohun Bagan U19	1–0	East Bengal U19	Kolkata
14:15 IST	Lirongthung Lotha 90+3'	Report		Stadium: Mohun Bagan Ground

3 January 2015	United U19	6–1	Mohammedan U19	Kalyani
14:00 IST	Sandip Bhattacharjee 14', 57', 79'; Babun Das 53'; Abdul Sajat 85'; Suvankar Dey 90+3'	Report	Asif Hussain 7'	Stadium: Kalyani Ground

7 January 2015	Mohun Bagan U19	1–0	Mohammedan U19	Kolkata
14:15 IST	Rohit Negi 38'	Report		Stadium: Mohun Bagan Ground

8 January 2015	East Bengal U19	1–1	United U19	Kolkata
14:15 IST	Enzamul Haque 57'	Report	Jagannath Oraon 9'	Stadium: East Bengal Ground

== Group B – Goa ==
=== Table ===
Team	Pld	W	D	L	GF	GA	GD	Pts	Qualification
AIFF Elite Academy	8	7	1	0	27	1	+26	22	Final Round
Salgaocar U19	8	4	2	2	15	5	+10	14	Final Round
Sporting Goa U19	8	2	2	4	7	13	−6	8	
SESA U19	8	2	2	4	7	14	−7	8	
Dempo U19	8	0	3	5	4	27	−23	3	

=== Fixtures and Results ===
13 December 2014	AIFF Elite Academy	3–0	SESA U19	Margao
15:30 IST	Milan Basumatary 18', 57'; Daniel Lalhimpuia 52'	Report		Stadium: Chowghule Sports Complex

14 December 2014	Salgaocar U19	2–1	Dempo U19	Cuncolim
15:45 IST	Naro Hari Shreshtha 69'; Denil D'Rebello 89'	Report	Aaron Rodrigues 49'	Stadium: Cuncolim Ground

18 December 2014	AIFF Elite Academy	5–1	Dempo U19	Cuncolim
15:30 IST	Rakesh Oram 5', 85', 90+1'; Daniel Lalhimpuia 44'; Robinson Singh 70'	Report	Jorge Rodrigues 54'	Stadium: Cuncolim Ground

19 December 2014	Sporting Goa U19	1–2	SESA U19	Panji
15:45 IST	Manuel Leon Fernandes 38'	Report	Aaren D'Silva 34'; Avrhisto Leon Fernandes 90+1'	Stadium: Don Bosco Ground

23 December 2014	AIFF Elite Academy	2–0	Sporting Goa U19	Cuncolim
15:30 IST	Kamalpreet Singh 15'; Robinson Singh 81'	Report		Stadium: Cuncolim Ground

24 December 2014	Dempo U19	1–1	SESA U19	Sanquelim
16:00 IST	Kapil Hoble 53'	Report	Sanny Ferraro 41'	Stadium: SESA Ground

28 December 2014	SESA U19	2–2	Salgaocar U19	Sanquelim
16:00 IST	Aaren D'Silva 25'; Kirtikesh Gadekar 25'	Report	Naro Hari Shreshtha 68'; Gurba Gagrai 72'	Stadium: SESA Ground

29 December 2014	Dempo U19	0–0	Sporting Goa U19	Sanquelim
16:00 IST		Report		Stadium: SESA Ground

10 January 2015	SESA U19	1–0	Dempo U19	Sanquelim
16:00 IST	Aaren D'Silva 74'	Report		Stadium: SESA Ground

15 January 2015	SESA U19	1–4	Sporting Goa U19	Sanquelim
16:00 IST	Sanny Ferraro 24'	Report	Sumit Ghosh 10', 56'; James Fernandes 19'; Manuel Leon Fernandes 90+3'	Stadium: SESA Ground

16 January 2015	Dempo U19	0–8	Salgaocar U19	Sanquelim
16:00 IST		Report	Naro Hari Shrestha 11', 21', 45'; Stefen Fernandes 25', 43', 52'; Jason Barbosa 29'; Yogesh Gouns (OG) 90+3'	Stadium: SESA Ground

20 January 2015	Sporting Goa U19	1–1	Dempo U19	Panji
15:45 IST	James Fernandes 7'	Report	Jayson Lucas 14'	Stadium: Don Bosco Ground

21 January 2015	Salgaocar U19	0–1	AIFF Elite Academy	Cuncolim
15:45 IST		Report	Delbert Fernandes 82'	Stadium: Cuncolim Ground

25 January 2015	SESA U19	0–1	AIFF Elite Academy	Sanquelim
16:00 IST		Report	Rakesh Oram 11'	Stadium: SESA Ground

26 January 2015	Salgaocar U19	1–0	Sporting Goa U19	Cuncolim
15:45 IST	Naro Hari Shrestha 7'	Report		Stadium: Cuncolim Ground

30 January 2015	Sporting Goa U19	1–0	Salgaocar U19	Panji
15:45 IST				Stadium: Don Bosco Ground

31 January 2015	Dempo U19	0–9	AIFF Elite Academy	Sanquelim
16:00 IST		Report	Daniel Lalhlimpuia 24', 29', 52'; Prasanth Karuthadathukuni 30', 31', 48'; Kamalpreet Singh 54', 85'; Amey Ranawade 84'	Stadium: SESA Ground

4 February 2015	Sporting Goa U19	0–6	AIFF Elite Academy	Panji
15:45 IST		Report	Milan Basumatary 10', 38'; Daniel Lalhlimpuia 15', 90+2'; Robinson Singh 44'; Delbert Fernandes 70'	Stadium: Don Bosco Ground

5 February 2015	Salgaocar U19	2–0	SESA U19	Cuncolim
15:45 IST	Naro Hari Shrestha 27'; Stefen Fernandes 90+2'	Report		Stadium: Cuncolim Ground

10 February 2015	AIFF Elite Academy	0–0	Salgaocar U19	Benaulim
14:30 IST				Stadium: Banaulim Ground

== Group C – Maharashtra ==
=== Table ===
Team	Pld	W	D	L	GF	GA	GD	Pts	Qualification
Pune U19	8	6	1	1	31	9	+22	19	Final Round
DSK Shivajians U19	8	6	1	1	26	7	+19	19	Final Round
Kenkre U19	8	2	3	3	10	18	−8	9	
Mumbai U19	8	2	1	5	7	18	−11	7	
PIFA U19	8	0	2	6	6	28	−22	2	

=== Fixtures and Results ===
13 December 2014	Pune U19	3–0	Mumbai U19	Pune
15:30 IST	Asheer Akhtar 9'; Dimple Bhagat 16'; Altamash Sayed 70'	Report		Stadium: Pune Training Ground

14 December 2014	DSK Shivajians U19	6–0	PIFA U19	Pune
17:00 IST	Lallianzuala 18', 31'; Rohit Kumar 24'; Jerry Mawihmingthanga 27', 55', 85'	Report		Stadium: DSK Training Ground

19 December 2014	Pune U19	1–3	DSK Shivajians U19	Pune
15:30 IST	Farukh Choudhary 39'	Report	Lallianzuala 21', 44'; Lalnunsiama 69'	Stadium: Pune Training Ground

20 December 2014	Kenkre U19	1–0	Mumbai U19	Mumbai
17:15 IST	Yash Mhatre 19'	Report		Stadium: Cooperage Ground

23 December 2014	PIFA U19	2–2	Kenkre U19	Mumbai
15:30 IST	Mohd. Atif 48'; Ronith Jain 90+2'	Report	Arif Shaikh 88'; Kenneth Fernandes 90'	Stadium: Cooperage Ground

24 December 2014	Mumbai U19	1–3	DSK Shivajians U19	Mumbai
15:30 IST	Karthik Yenurkar 30'	Report	Patrick Mascarenhas 57', 61'; Lallianzuala 77'	Stadium: Cooperage Ground

28 December 2014	DSK Shivajians U19	4–1	Kenkre U19	Pune
17:00 IST	Jerry Mawihmingthanga 18', 59'; Lallianzuala 26', 60'	Report	Arif Shaikh 40'	Stadium: DSK Training Ground

29 December 2014	Pune U19	7–1	PIFA U19	Pune
15:30 IST	Sanchayan Sammadar 10', 30'; Farukh Choudhary 14', 44', 68'; Myron Mendes 22'; Altamash Sayed 27'	Report	Arjun Mehra 59'	Stadium: Pune Training Ground

2 January 2015	Pune U19	1–1	Kenkre U19	Pune
15:30 IST	Sanchayan Samadder 18'	Report	Kunal Mhatre 90+2'	Stadium: Pune Training Ground

4 January 2015	PIFA U19	0–1	Mumbai U19	Mumbai
15:30 IST		Report	Nachiket Palav 79'	Stadium: Cooperage Ground

7 January 2015	Mumbai U19	1–6	Pune U19	Mumbai
15:30 IST	Nachiket Palav 82'	Report	Arif Shaikh 22', 63', 84'; Sannik Murmu 43'; Asheer Akhtar 72'; Dimple Bhagat 90+3'	Stadium: Cooperage Ground

9 January 2015	PIFA U19	0–3	DSK Shivajians U19	Mumbai
15:30 IST		Report	Lallianzuala 19', 47', 83'	Stadium: Cooperage Ground

12 January 2015	Mumbai U19	0–2	Kenkre U19	Mumbai
15:30 IST		Report	Rohan Dalvi 54'; Faizan Thange 90'	Stadium: Cooperage Ground

13 January 2015	DSK Shivajians U19	1–3	Pune U19	Pune
17:00 IST	Lallianzuala 7'	Report	Farukh Choudhary 41', 78'; Arif Shaikh 85'	Stadium: DSK Training Ground

17 January 2015	Kenkre U19	1–1	PIFA U19	Mumbai
15:30 IST	Rohan Dalvi 7'	Report	Pragnesh Solanki 49'	Stadium: Cooperage Ground

18 January 2015	DSK Shivajians U19	1–1	Mumbai U19	Pune
17:00 IST	Jerry Mawihmingthanga 34'	Report	Giric Khosla 9'	Stadium: DSK Training Ground

23 January 2015	PIFA U19	0–5	Pune U19	Mumbai
15:30 IST		Report	Farukh Choudhary 52', 72'; Myron Mendes 63'; Altamash Sayed 70', 83'	Stadium: Cooperage Ground

24 January 2015	Kenkre U19	0–5	DSK Shivajians U19	Mumbai
15:30 IST		Report	Rohit Kumar 58'; Jerry Mawihmingthanga 68', 80'; Lallianzuala 81'; Biaklian Paite 90+2'	Stadium: Cooperage Ground

27 January 2015	Kenkre U19	2–5	Pune U19	Mumbai
15:30 IST	Yash Mhatre 14', 46'	Report	Prakash Sarkar 8'; Arif Shaikh 23', 88'; Akshay Pashilkar 41'; Farukh Choudhary 43'	Stadium: Cooperage Ground

28 January 2015	Mumbai U19	3–2	PIFA U19	Mumbai
15:30 IST	Dig Vijay 16'; Sreeraj Nair 67'; Giric Khosla 78'	Report	Mohd. Atif 73'; Pragnesh Solanki 90+2'	Stadium: Cooperage Ground

== Group D – Rest of India ==
Rest of India were divided in Zone A and Zone B and began their games on 1 February 2015.

=== Zone A ===
==== Table ====
Team	Pld	W	D	L	GF	GA	GD	Pts	Qualification
Hindustan U19	3	2	1	0	5	0	+5	7	Final Round
TATA FA U19	3	2	1	0	5	0	+5	7	
Lonestar Kashmir U19	3	0	1	2	2	6	−4	1	
Bengaluru U19	3	0	1	2	2	8	−6	1	

Hindustan U19 qualified for the final round after the draws in their favour, as TATA FA U19 and Hindustan finished level on points, goal difference and goal scored.

==== Fixtures and Results ====
1 February 2015	Lonestar Kashmir U19	2–2	Bengaluru U19	New Delhi
10:00	Assrar Mohd. 16'; Wasiq Wani 87'	Report	Nirvair Nair 45'; Mani Vannan 82'	Stadium: Ambedkar Stadium

1 February 2015	Hindustan U19	0–0	TATA FA U19	New Delhi
14:00		Report		Stadium: Ambedkar Stadium

4 February 2015	Hindustan U19	1–0	Lonestar Kashmir U19	New Delhi
10:00	Gagandeep Singh 49'	Report		Stadium: Ambedkar Stadium

4 February 2015	Bengaluru U19	0–2	TATA FA U19	New Delhi
14:00		Report	Kupar Dohling 30'; Thiyam Chingkheingamba 74'	Stadium: Ambedkar Stadium

6 February 2015	TATA FA U19	3–0	Lonestar Kashmir U19	New Delhi
10:00	Hitesh Sharma 12', 75'; Gulshan Kumar 85' (o.g.)	Report		Stadium: Ambedkar Stadium

6 February 2015	Hindustan U19	4–0	Bengaluru U19	New Delhi
14:00	Vishal Deep 14'; Dilli Ram Sanyasi 16', 25'; Ramthing Jajo 32'	Report		Stadium: Ambedkar Stadium

=== Zone B ===
==== Table ====
Team	Pld	W	D	L	GF	GA	GD	Pts	Qualification
Chanmari U19	3	2	1	0	6	2	4+	7	Final round
Shilong Lajong U19	3	1	1	3	3	3	0	4	
Aizawl U19	3	1	1	3	3	4	−1	4	
Royal Wahingdoh U19	3	0	1	2	4	7	−3	1	

==== Fixtures and Results ====
4 February 2015	Shilong Lajong U19	0–0	Chanmari U19	Aizawl
11:00		Report		Stadium: Lammual Stadium

4 February 2015	Aizawl U19	1–1	Royal Wahingdoh U19	Aizawl
14:00		Report		Stadium: Lammual Stadium

7 February 2015	Aizawl U19	1–0	Shilong Lajong U19	Aizawl
11:00				Stadium: Lammual Stadium

7 February 2015	Chanmari U19	3–1	Royal Wahingdoh U19	Aizawl
14:00				Stadium: Lammual Stadium

11 February 2015	Royal Wahingdoh U19	2–3	Shilong Lajong U19	Aizawl
11:00				Stadium: Lammual Stadium

11 February 2015	Aizawl U19	1–3	Chanmari U19	Aizawl
14:00				Stadium: Lammual Stadium

== Final round ==
Two teams each from Kolkata, Goa and Maharashtra zone will progress to the final round, while one team each from two Rest of India zones will go to the final round.

Team	Pld	W	D	L	GF	GA	GD	Pts	Champions
AIFF Elite Academy	7	6	1	0	20	3	+17	19	Champions
Pune U19	7	5	1	1	14	8	+6	16	
Salgaocar U19	7	3	2	2	12	8	+4	11	
Chanmari U19	7	3	1	3	7	13	−6	10	
United SC U19	7	2	2	3	8	9	−1	8	
Mohun Bagan U19	7	1	3	3	6	12	−6	6	
DSK Shivajians U19	7	1	1	5	11	16	−5	4	
Hindustan U19	7	0	3	4	1	7	−6	3	

Source : I-League
Updated: 6 May 2015

=== Round 1 ===
20 April 2015	Pune U19	4–2	DSK Shivajians U19	Pune
17:15	Mohd. Ashique Kuruniyan 38'; Sanchayan Samadder 45'; Dimple Bhagat 63'; Arif Shaikh 73'	Report	Patrick Mascarenhas 26'; Chhangte Lalhriatpuia 27'	Stadium: DSK Football Field

20 April 2015	AIFF Elite Academy	2–1	Salgaocar U19	Pune
20:00	Daniel Lalhlimpuia 33'; A. Malswamzuala 85'	Report	Naro Hari Shreshta 69'	Stadium: DSK Football Field

21 April 2015	Chanmari U19	1–1	Mohun Bagan U19	Pune
17:15	R. Lalrinsanga 80' (pen.)	Report	Mahata Mundri 46'	Stadium: DSK Football Field

21 April 2015	Hindustan U19	0–0	United U19	Pune
20:00		Report		Stadium: DSK Football Field

=== Round 2 ===
22 April 2015	DSK Shivajians U19	1–4	AIFF Elite Academy	Pune
17:15	Jerry Mawihmingthang 47'	Report	Milan Basumatary 17', 39'; Daniel Lalhimpuia 40'; Robinson Singh 62'	Stadium: DSK Football Field

22 April 2015	Pune U19	0–2	Salgaocar U19	Pune
20:15		Report	Naro Hari Shreshta 3', 41'	Stadium: DSK Football Field

23 April 2015	Hindustan U19	0–0	Mohun Bagan U19	Pune
17:15		Report		Stadium: DSK Football Field

23 April 2015	United U19	2–0	Chanmari U19	Pune
20:15				Stadium: DSK Football Field

=== Round 3 ===
24 April 2015	Salgaocar U19	2–2	DSK Shivajians U19	Pune
17:15	Lalit Tariad 40'; Myron Borges 46'	Report	Lallianzuala 10'; Jerry Mawihmingthanga 43'	Stadium: DSK Football Field

24 April 2015	AIFF Elite Academy	1–1	Pune U19	Pune
20:15	Daniel Lalhlimpuia 88' (pen.)	Report	Dimple Bhagat 61'	Stadium: DSK Football Field

25 April 2015	Hindustan U19	1–2	Chanmari U19	Pune
17:15				Stadium: DSK Football Field

25 April 2015	United U19	1–1	Mohun Bagan U19	Pune
20:15				Stadium: DSK Football Field

=== Round 4 ===
27 April 2015	Chanmari U19	1–0	Salgaocar U19	Pune
17:15				Stadium: DSK Football Field

27 April 2015	United U19	2–3	Pune U19	Pune
20:15	Biswajit Sarkar 10'; Subrata Lohar 76'	Report	Altamash Sayed 39', 41'; Mohammad Ashique 45+2'	Stadium: DSK Football Field

28 April 2015	Mohun Bagan U19	3–2	DSK Shivajians U19	Pune
17:15	M Baite 11'; Suman Hazra 35' (pen.); Jerry O'Pulamte 90+2'	Report	Lallianzuala 8', 16'	Stadium: DSK Football Field

28 April 2015	AIFF Elite Academy	2–0	Hindustan U19	Pune
20:15	Milan Basumatary 10', 30'	Report		Stadium: DSK Football Field

=== Round 5 ===
29 April 2015	Chanmari U19	1–2	Pune U19	Pune
17:15	Lalawmpuia 42'	Report	Md. Yasir 54', 64'	Stadium: DSK Football Field

29 April 2015	Salgaocar U19	3–2	United U19	Pune
20:15				Stadium: DSK Football Field

30 April 2015	Hindustan U19	0–3	DSK Shivajians U19	Pune
17:15		Report	Jerry Mawihmingthanga 3', 33'; Lallianzuala 62'	Stadium: DSK Football Field

30 April 2015	Mohun Bagan U19	0–3	AIFF Elite Academy	Pune
20:15		Report	Rakesh Oram 30'; Daniel Lalhlimpuia 50'; Suman Sarkar 77'	Stadium: DSK Football Field

=== Round 6 ===
2 May 2015	Salgaocar U19	0–0	Hindustan U19	Pune
17:15				Stadium: DSK Football Field

2 May 2015	Pune U19	1–0	Mohun Bagan U19	Pune
20:15	Arif Shaikh 45+1'	Report		Stadium: DSK Football Field

4 May 2015	AIFF Elite Academy	6–0	Chanmari U19	Pune
17:15	Daniel Lalhlimpuia 15', 76'; Rakesh Oram 34'; Milan Basumatary 37', 41', 90+3'	Report		Stadium: DSK Football Field

4 May 2015	DSK Shivajians U19	0–1	United U19	Pune
20:15		Report	Jagannath Oraon 52'	Stadium: DSK Football Field

=== Round 7 ===
5 May 2015	Pune U19	3–0	Hindustan U19	Pune
17:15	Arif Shaikh 17'; Altamash Sayed 48'; Mohammed Yasir 78'	Report		Stadium: DSK Football Field

5 May 2015	Mohun Bagan U19	1–4	Salgaocar U19	Pune
20:15	Rohit Negi 21'	Report	Myron Borges 17', 48', 76'; Stephen Fernandes 45+1'	Stadium: DSK Football Field

6 May 2015	United U19	0–2	AIFF Elite Academy	Pune
17:15		Report	Mohd. Sajid Dhot 28'; Milan Basumatary 45+2'	Stadium: DSK Football Field

6 May 2015	DSK Shivajians U19	1–2	Chanmari U19	Pune
20:15	Rohit Kumar 9'	Report	10'; Jesse Laldinpuia 60'	Stadium: DSK Football Field

== Top scorers ==
Rank	Player	Team	Goals
1	Lallianzuala Chhangte	DSK Shivajians U19	16
2	Daniel Lalhlimpuia	AIFF Elite Academy	13
3	Milan Basumatary	AIFF Elite Academy	12
3	Jerry Mawihmingthanga	DSK Shivajians U19	12
5	Naro Hari Shrestha	Salgaocar U19	10
6	Altamash Sayed	Pune U19	9
6	Farukh Choudhary	Pune U19	9
