= 2014 I-League U19 =

- League: 2014 I-League U19
- Sport: Association football
- Duration: 2014
- Teams: 28

I-League U19 season
- Champions: Tata FA (2nd title)
- Top scorer: Udanta Singh (Tata FA) (9 goals)

I-League U19 seasons
- ← 2013 2014–15 →

The 2014 I-League U19 was the sixth season of the Indian I-League U19 competition. The season ran alongside the 2013–14 I-League season. Pune F.C. were defending champions, but were knocked out in zonal stage. Tata Football Academy won the league.

The League was played in a new format and had 29 teams contest for top honours in a two-tier run to the title. The five zones include, Kolkata, Mumbai, Shillong, Goa and Rest of India. The four city-named zones engaged themselves in a home-away format with the winner advancing to the final leg was held in Jamshedpur. The Rest of India zone played a single-leg in Jamshedpur that began on 8 April with the Top 2 advancing. On 8 January 2014 Mumbai Tigers U19 pulled out from the tournament. The league began on 10 February.

The Final-leg of the I-League U19, which included 6 teams was held in mid-April in Jamshedpur and played on a single-leg.

== Teams ==
Goa Zone	Kolkata Zone	Maharashtra Zone	Rest of India Zone	Shillong Zone
Churchill Brothers U19; Dempo U19; Salgaocar 19; SESA U19; Sporting Goa U19	Bhawanipore U19; East Bengal U19; Kalighat MS U19; Mohammedan U19; Mohun Bagan U19; United U19	AIFF U19; Kenkre U19; Mumbai U19; PIFA U19; Pune U19	Aizawl U19; Bengaluru U19; Eagles U19; Garhwal U19; Hindustan U19; MP United U19; Tata U19	Green Valley U19; Rangdajied United U19; Royal Wahingdoh U19; Shillong Lajong U19

== Group stage ==
=== Goa Zone ===
Team	Pld	W	D	L	GF	GA	GD	Pts	Qualification
SESA U19	8	6	2	0	20	5	+15	20	Final Round
Salgaocar U19	8	4	1	2	15	4	+11	16	
Sporting Goa U19	8	4	1	3	9	12	–3	13	
Dempo U19	8	1	1	6	9	20	–11	4	
Churchill Brothers U19	8	0	3	5	5	17	–12	3	

Date	Team 1	Score	Team 2
10/2/14	Salgaocar U19	2–0	Churchill Brothers U19
11/2/14	Dempo U19	0–5	SESA U19
14/2/14	Dempo U19	1–3	Salgaocar U19
14/2/14	Sporting Goa U19	0–1	SESA U19
18/2/14	Churchill Brothers U19	1–2	Sporting Goa U19
18/2/14	SESA U19	1–1	Salgaocar U19
21/2/14	Salgaocar U19	0–1	Sporting Goa U19
21/2/14	Dempo U19	4–0	Churchill Brothers U19
24/2/14	Dempo U19	0–1	Sporting Goa U19
24/2/14	Churchill Brothers U19	0–0	SESA U19
27/2/14	Churchill Brothers U19	0–3	Salgaocar U19
27/2/14	SESA U19	3–1	Dempo U19
7/3/14	SESA U19	5–1	Sporting Goa U19
7/3/14	Salgaocar U19	4–0	Dempo U19
10/3/14	Salgaocar U19	0–1	SESA U19
10/3/14	Sporting Goa U19	1–1	Churchill Brothers U19
14/3/14	Churchill Brothers U19	1–1	Dempo U19
14/3/14	Sporting Goa U19	0–2	Salgaocar U19
19/3/14	Sporting Goa U19	3–2	Dempo U19
19/3/14	SESA U19	4–2	Churchill Brothers U19

Source: I-League

=== Kolkata Zone ===
Team	Pld	W	D	L	GF	GA	GD	Pts	Qualification
East Bengal U19	10	7	1	2	16	5	+11	22	Final Round
United U19	10	6	2	2	17	7	+10	20	
Mohun Bagan U19	10	4	4	2	14	9	+5	16	
Kalighat MS U19	10	4	1	5	11	14	-3	13	
Bhawanipore U19	10	3	2	5	11	14	–3	11	
Mohammedan U19	10	1	0	9	8	28	-20	3	

Date	Team 1	Score	Team 2
11/2/14	United U19	2-0	Kalighat MS U19
11/2/14	Mohammedan U19	0-1	Mohun Bagan U19
12/2/14	East Bengal U19	2-0	Bhawanipore U19
14/2/14	Bhawanipore U19	1-1	Mohun Bagan U19
14/2/14	Kalighat MS U19	0-1	East Bengal U19
15/2/14	Mohammedan U19	0-2	United U19
18/2/14	Bhawanipore U19	2-1	Mohammedan U19
18/2/14	Mohun Bagan U19	3-0	Kalighat MS U19
19/2/14	East Bengal U19	0-0	United U19
21/2/14	United U19	4-1	Bhawanipore U19
21/2/14	Mohun Bagan U19	0-2	East Bengal U19
22/2/14	Mohammedan U19	4-2	Kalighat MS U19
25/2/14	Mohun Bagan U19	1-2	United U19
25/2/14	Mohammedan U19	1-2	East Bengal U19
26/2/14	Kalighat MS U19	2-1	Bhawanipore U19
28/2/14	Bhawanipore U19	1-0	United U19
28/2/14	East Bengal U19	0-1	Mohun Bagan U19
1/3/14	Kalighat MS U19	3–0	Mohammedan U19
7/3/14	Mohun Bagan U19	0-0	Bhawanipore U19
7/3/14	East Bengal U19	1-0	Kalighat MS U19
8/3/14	United U19	3–0	Mohammedan U19
11/3/14	Mohammedan U19	1–5	Bhawanipore U19
11/3/14	Kalighat MS U19	2–2	Mohun Bagan U19
14/3/14	Mohun Bagan U19	3–0	Mohammedan U19
15/3/14	Bhawanipore U19	0–2	East Bengal U19
15/3/14	Kalighat MS U19	1–0	United U19
18/3/14	United U19	2–2	Mohun Bagan U19
19/3/14	Bhawanipore U19	0–1	Kalighat MS U19
19/3/14	East Bengal U19	5–1	Mohammedan U19
20/3/14	United U19	2-1	East Bengal U19

Source: I-League

=== Maharashtra Zone ===
Team	Pld	W	D	L	GF	GA	GD	Pts	Qualification
AIFF Academy	8	7	0	1	26	7	+19	21	Final Round
Pune U19	8	5	2	1	18	11	+7	17	
Mumbai U19	8	4	0	4	18	17	+1	12	
Kenkre U19	8	2	1	5	15	27	-12	7	
PIFA U19	8	0	1	7	5	20	-15	1	

Date	Team 1	Score	Team 2
14/1/14	PIFA U19	1-2	Kenkre U19
15/1/14	AIFF Academy	4-0	Mumbai U19
17/1/14	Kenkre U19	0-3	Pune U19
18/1/14	AIFF Academy	2-0	PIFA U19
20/1/14	Pune U19	4-1	Mumbai U19
21/1/14	Kenkre U19	2-5	AIFF Academy
11/2/14	AIFF Academy	3-1	Pune U19
12/2/14	PIFA U19	1-5	Mumbai U19
14/2/14	Pune U19	0-0	PIFA U19
18/2/14	Kenkre U19	2-1	PIFA U19
19/2/14	Mumbai U19	0-2	AIFF Academy
21/2/14	Pune U19	4-4	Kenkre U19
22/2/14	PIFA U19	0-4	AIFF Academy
24/2/14	Mumbai U19	1-2	Pune U19
24/2/14	AIFF Academy	5-2	Kenkre U19
28/2/14	Pune U19	2-1	AIFF Academy
1/3/14	Mumbai U19	3-1	PIFA U19
4/3/14	Mumbai U19	4–1	Kenkre U19
7/3/14	PIFA U19	1-2	Pune U19
8/3/14	Kenkre U19	2-4	Mumbai U19

Source: I-League

=== Rest of India Zone ===
==== Zone A ====
Team	Pld	W	D	L	GF	GA	GD	Pts	Qualification
Hindustan U19	3	2	1	0	5	2	+3	7	Final Round
Bengaluru U19	3	1	1	1	5	6	–1	4	
Aizawl U19	3	0	2	1	3	4	–1	1	
Garhwal U19	3	0	2	1	1	2	–1	1	

Date	Team 1	Score	Team 2
8/4/14	Bengaluru U19	2 – 2	Aizawl U19
8/4/14	Garhwal U19	0 – 0	Hindustan U19
10/4/14	Hindustan U19	2 – 1	Aizawl U19
10/4/14	Garhwal U19	1 – 2	Bengaluru U19
12/4/14	Aizawl U19	0 – 0	Garhwal U19
12/4/14	Hindustan U19	3 – 1	Bengaluru U19

Source: I-League

==== Zone B ====
Team	Pld	W	D	L	GF	GA	GD	Pts	Qualification
Tata U19	2	2	0	0	9	1	+8	6	Final Round
MP United U19	1	0	0	1	1	5	–4	0	
Eagles U19	1	0	0	1	0	4	-4	0	

Date	Team 1	Score	Team 2
9/4/14	Tata U19	4 – 0	Eagles U19
11/4/14	MP United U19	1 – 5	Tata U19
13/4/14	Eagles U19	1 – 1	MP United U19

Source: I-League

=== North-East Zone ===
Team	Pld	W	D	L	GF	GA	GD	Pts	Qualification
Shillong Lajong U19	6	6	0	0	15	5	+10	18	Final Round
Royal Wahingdoh U19	6	4	0	2	15	4	+11	12	
Rangdajied United U19	6	1	1	4	10	13	-3	4	
Green Valley U19	6	0	1	5	4	2	-18	1	

Date	Team 1	Score	Team 2
11/2/14	Shillong Lajong U19	1-0	Rangdajied United U19
12/2/14	Royal Wahingdoh U19	2-0	Green Valley U19
18/2/14	Royal Wahingdoh U19	0-1	Shillong Lajong U19
19/2/14	Green Valley U19	0-0	Rangdajied United U19
25/2/14	Green Valley U19	1-5	Royal Wahingdoh U19
26/2/14	Rangdajied United U19	2-3	Shillong Lajong U19
4/3/14	Shillong Lajong U19	4-0	Green Valley U19
5/3/14	Rangdajied United U19	0-2	Royal Wahingdoh U19
11/3/14	Shillong Lajong U19	2-0	Royal Wahingdoh U19
12/3/14	Rangdajied United U19	7-1	Green Valley U19
17/3/14	Green Valley U19	2-3	Shillong Lajong U19
18/3/14	Royal Wahingdoh U19	5-0	Rangdajied United U19

Source: I-League

== Final round ==
Team	Pld	W	D	L	GF	GA	GD	Pts	Champions
Tata FA U19	5	4	1	0	12	3	+9	13	Champions
East Bengal U19	5	3	1	1	13	5	+8	10	
SESA U19	5	3	0	2	15	8	+7	9	
Shillong Lajong U19	5	2	0	3	9	7	+2	6	
AIFF Academy	5	2	0	3	8	12	–4	6	
Hindustan U19	5	0	0	5	3	25	–22	0	

Source: I-League

=== Round 1 ===
21 April 2014	East Bengal U19	0 – 0	Tata FA U19	JRD Tata Sports Complex, Jamshedpur

21 April 2014	SESA U19	2 – 1	Shillong Lajong U19	JRD Tata Sports Complex, Jamshedpur
	Garrison 24'; Jason 74'		Zodingliana 64'

21 April 2014	AIFF Academy	2 – 1	Hindustan U19	Keenan Stadium, Jamshedpur
	Gill 74'; Malsawmzuala 79'		Johnson 45'

=== Round 2 ===
23 April 2014	Tata FA U19	4 – 1	AIFF Academy	JRD Tata Sports Complex, Jamshedpur
	Udanta 5', 43', 67'; Samrat 58'		Suman 65'

23 April 2014	Hindustan U19	1 – 5	Shillong Lajong U19	JRD Tata Sports Complex, Jamshedpur
	Tilak 41'		Zodingliana 12'; Tlang 22'; Angaou 35'; B. Singh 50', 80'

23 April 2014	SESA U19	2 – 3	East Bengal U19	Keenan Stadium, Jamshedpur
	Jaison; Colaco		Roy; Murmu; Somnath

=== Round 3 ===
25 April 2014	Hindustan U19	1 – 7	SESA U19	JRD Tata Sports Complex, Jamshedpur
	Tilak 49'	Report	Cardozo 30', 33', 61'; Colaco 44', 57', 69', 82'

25 April 2014	Shillong Lajong U19	1 – 2	Tata FA U19	JRD Tata Sports Complex, Jamshedpur
	Lalrammuana 76'	Report	Udanta 50', 69'

25 April 2014	AIFF Academy	3 – 2	East Bengal U19	Keenan Stadium, Jamshedpur
	Gurshirmat 15', 90+3'; Milan 41'	Report	Murmu 34'; Nayek 36'

=== Round 4 ===
27 April 2014	Shillong Lajong U19	2 – 1	AIFF Academy	JRD Tata Sports Complex, Jamshedpur
	Rupert Nongrum 77'; Nim Dorjee Tamang 16'	Report	Bidyananda Singh 33' (pen.)

27 April 2014	East Bengal U19	7 – 0	HindustanU19	JRD Tata Sports Complex, Jamshedpur
	Murmu 32', 34', 53', 78'; Somnath 50'; Bag 74'; Sana 86'

27 April 2014	SESA U19	1 – 2	Tata FA U19	Keenan Stadium, Jamshedpur
	Martins 90+2'		Asil 72', 78'

=== Round 5 ===
29 April 2014	Shillong Lajong U19	0 – 1	East Bengal U19	JRD Tata Sports Complex, Jamshedpur
			Murmu 18'

29 April 2014	SESA U19	3 – 1	AIFF Academy	JRD Tata Sports Complex, Jamshedpur
	Jaison; Olvin; Estevan		Milan

29 April 2014	Tata FA U19	4 – 0	Hindustan U19	Keenan Stadium, Jamshedpur
	Udanta 36', 39', 61', 80'	Report
