= 2012 I-League U20 =

- League: 2012 I-League U20
- Sport: Association football
- Duration: 2012
- Teams: 14

I-League U20 season
- Champions: Pune
- Top scorer: Jayesh Rane (13 goals) Mumbai

I-League U20 seasons
- ← 2011 2013 →

The 2012 I-League U20 was the fourth season of the Indian I-League U20 competition. The season ran alongside the closing stages of the 2011–12 I-League season. The AIFF development team, Pailan Arrows, did not field their team in the competition as they were already an U21-Team in the I-League. The preliminary phase of the 2012 U20 league was played in three cities, Kalyani, Mumbai and within the state of Goa. The final round of the competition was held in Kalyani with Pune F.C. Academy coming out as winners.

== Teams ==
Group A	Group B	Group C
Churchill Brothers; Dempo; Salgaocar; Sporting Clube de Goa	Air India; Chirag United Kerala; HAL; Mumbai; Pune	East Bengal; Mohun Bagan; Prayag United; Shillong Lajong

== Group stage ==
=== Group A ===
Team	Pld	W	D	L	GF	GA	GD	Pts	Qualification
Churchill Brothers	3	2	0	1	4	6	−2	6	Final Round
Dempo	3	1	2	0	7	3	+4	5	Final Round
Sporting Clube de Goa	3	1	1	1	9	3	+6	4	
Salgaocar	3	0	1	2	1	9	−8	1	

16 April 2012	Dempo	5–1	Churchill Brothers	Poriat Ground, Goa
	R. Fernandes (4 goals); Serotorio	Report	M. Fernandez

17 April 2012	Sporting Clube de Goa	7–0	Salgaocar	Poriat Ground, Goa
	J. Fernandes (2 goals); Ali; Castanha; Dias; Ningthoujam; Cardozo	Report

21 April 2012	Dempo	1–1	Salgaocar	Poriat Ground, Goa
	R. Fernandes 75'	Report	G. Silva 20'

22 April 2012	Sporting Clube de Goa	1–2	Churchill Brothers	Poriat Ground, Goa
	Ningthoujam 15'	Report	R. Costa 34', 45'

25 April 2012	Dempo	1–1	Sporting Clube de Goa	Poriat Ground, Goa
	R. Fernandes 75'	Report	Ningthoujam 32'

26 April 2012	Salgaocar	0–1	Churchill Brothers	Poriat Ground, Goa
		Report	Unknown

=== Group B ===
Team	Pld	W	D	L	GF	GA	GD	Pts	Qualification
Pune	4	4	0	0	14	4	+10	12	Final Round
Mumbai	4	3	0	1	8	3	+5	9	Final Round
Air India	4	1	0	3	3	7	−4	3	
Chirag United Kerala	4	1	0	3	3	7	−4	3	
HAL	4	1	0	3	2	9	−7	0	

18 April 2012	Air India	2–0	Chirag United Kerala	Fr. Agnel Stadium, Navi Mumbai
	Khatti; Bedekar	Report

18 April 2012	Mumbai	1–0	HAL	Fr. Agnel Stadium, Navi Mumbai
	D. Rodrigues	Report

20 April 2012	Pune	5–1	HAL	Fr. Agnel Stadium, Navi Mumbai
	Haokip 26', 38', 45'; Lalrempuia 59'; T. Meetie 71'	Report	S. Kumar 7'

20 April 2012	Mumbai	3–0	Chirag United Kerala	Fr. Agnel Stadium, Navi Mumbai
	Rane 29', 90'; Tandel 43'	Report

23 April 2012	HAL	0–3	Chirag United Kerala	Fr. Agnel Stadium, Navi Mumbai
		Report	Pauly 31'; R. Raj 67', 87'

23 April 2012	Pune	4–1	Air India	Fr. Agnel Stadium, Navi Mumbai
	Haokip 53'; D. Kumar 62'; T. Meetei 67'; Lalnunfela 80'		Nayak

25 April 2012	Air India	0–2	Mumbai	Fr. Agnel Stadium, Navi Mumbai
		Report	Khanvilkar 86'; Rane 90'

25 April 2012	Chirag United Kerala	0–2	Pune	Fr. Agnel Stadium, Navi Mumbai
		Report	Lalrempuia 64'; Lalnunfela 72'

27 April 2012	HAL	1–0	Air India	Fr. Agnel Stadium, Navi Mumbai
	Kumar 43'	Report

27 April 2012	Pune	3–2	Mumbai	Fr. Agnel Stadium, Navi Mumbai
	Meetei 65'; Lalbiakzara 74'; Lalnunfela 88'	Report	Tandel 33'; Sayed 86'

=== Group C ===
Team	Pld	W	D	L	GF	GA	GD	Pts	Qualification
Shillong Lajong	3	2	0	1	2	1	+1	6	Final Round
Prayag United	3	2	0	1	2	1	+1	6	Final Round
East Bengal	3	1	0	2	3	2	+1	3	
Mohun Bagan	3	1	0	2	1	4	−3	3	

17 April 2012	Mohun Bagan	1–0	Shillong Lajong	Kalyani
	Jonunmawaya	Report

17 April 2012	East Bengal	0–1	Prayag United	Kalyani
		Report	Burman

19 April 2012	Shillong Lajong	1–0	East Bengal	Kalyani
	Shaiborlong	Report

19 April 2012	Prayag United	1–0	Mohun Bagan	Kalyani
	Oraw	Report

21 April 2012	East Bengal	3–0	Mohun Bagan	Kalyani
	Mallick 30'; Tudu 79'; Doungel 81'	Report

21 April 2012	Prayag United	0–1	Shillong Lajong	Kalyani
		Report	Tlang 76'

== Final round ==
Pos	Team	Pld	W	D	L	GF	GA	GD	Pts	Qualification or relegation
1	Pune	5	5	0	0	15	2	+13	15	Champions
2	Mumbai	5	4	0	1	18	9	+9	12	
3	Shillong Lajong	5	2	1	2	5	9	−4	7	
4	Churchill Brothers	5	1	1	3	7	13	−6	4	
5	Dempo	5	1	0	4	5	16	−11	3	
6	United SC	5	0	2	3	4	9	−5	2	

Updated to match(es) played on 21 May 2012. Source: Kolkata Footballs
Rules for classification: 1) points; 2) goal difference; 3) number of goals scored.

6 May 2012	Shillong Lajong	2–3	Mumbai	Kalyani
	Kharpan 12'; Kharumnuid 85'	Report	M. Ali; Tandal; Rane

6 May 2012	Churchill Brothers	0–3	Pune	Kalyani
		Report	G. Singh 10'; Haokip 37'; Kadam 42'

7 May 2012	Prayag United	0–1	Dempo	Kalyani
		Report	Fernandez

9 May 2012	Mumbai	3–1	Prayag United	Kalyani
	Rane (3 goals)	Report	Senna

9 May 2012	Churchill Brothers	1–2	Shillong Lajong	Kalyani
	N. Rodriguez	Report	Nongrum 50'; Tlang 76'

10 May 2012	Pune	3–1	Dempo	Kalyani
	S. Kumar 21'; Lalnunfela 40'; Lalbiakzara 83'	Report	R. Fernandes 75'

12 May 2012	Shillong Lajong	0–0	Prayag United	Kalyani
		Report

12 May 2012	Dempo	1–3	Churchill Brothers	Kalyani
	Mascarenhas 31'	Report	M. Fernandes 53', 80', 89'

13 May 2012	Pune	4–0	Mumbai	Kalyani
	Kadam 37', 39'; Lalbiakzara 69'; D. Kumar 90'	Report

15 May 2012	Pune	2–0	Shillong Lajong	Kalyani
	Kumar 21'; Lalnenfula 41'	Report

15 May 2012	Dempo	1–7	Mumbai	Kalyani
	Pires 26'	Report	Rane 10', 29', 75', 90'; Killinger 6'; Santos 35'; Tandel 38'

16 May 2012	Churchill Brothers	2–2	Prayag United	Kalyani
	M. Fenandes 40'; H D'Costa 80'	Report	Pandey 32'; Chaterjee

18 May 2012	Shillong Lajong	3–1	Dempo	Kalyani
	Jacob 23'; Kharumnuid 34'; Tlang 63'	Report	Sheriton 8'

18 May 2012	Pune	3–1	Prayag United	Kalyani
	Lalnunfela 56', 69'; Own Goal 76' (o.g.)	Report	Oraon 28'

19 May 2012	Mumbai	5–1	Churchill Brothers	Kalyani
	Rane (2 Goals); Santos (2 Goals); Tandel	Report

== Scorers ==
=== Overall ===
Rank	Player	Club	Goals
1	(India) Jayesh Rane	Mumbai	13
2	(India) Romeo Fernandes	Dempo	7
2	(India) William Lalnunfela	Pune	7
4	(India) Melvin Fernandez	Churchill Brothers	5
4	(India) Thongkhosiem Haokip	Pune	5
6	(India) Chetan Tandel	Mumbai	4
7	(India) Nikhil Kadam	Pune	3
7	(India) Thangjam Meetie	Pune	3
7	(India) David Lalbiakzara	Pune	3
7	(India) Pritam Ningthoujam	Sporting Clube de Goa	3
7	(India) Redeem Tlang	Shillong Lajong	3
7	(India) Reed Santos	Mumbai	3

=== Final round ===
==== Leading scorers ====
Updated 21 May 2012

Total	Player		Club	Goals per Game				
Total	Player		Club	1	2	3	4	5
10	(India)	Jayesh Rane	Mumbai	1	3		4	2
4	(India)	Melvin Fernandez	Churchill Brothers			3	1	
4	(India)	William Lalnunfela	Pune		1		1	2
3	(India)	Nikhil Kadam	Pune	1		2		
3	(India)	Chetan Tandel	Mumbai	1		1		1
3	(India)	Reed Santos	Mumbai				1	2
2	(India)	David Lalbiakzara	Pune		1	1		
2	(India)	Suji Kumar	Pune		1		1	
2	(India)	Norasius Kharumnuid	Shillong Lajong	1				1
2	(India)	Redeem Tlang	Shillong Lajong	1				1

==== Other Scorers ====
1 goal

- (India) Hayston D’Costa (Churchill Brothers)
- (India) Nicholas Fernandez (Churchill Brothers)
- (India) Brian Mascarenhas (Dempo)
- (India) Geovito Fernandez (Dempo)
- (India) Romeo Fernandes (Dempo)
- (India) Shallum Pires (Dempo)
- (India) Mujaffar Ali (Mumbai)
- (India) Raunak Killinger (Mumbai)
- (India) Arjun Chaterjee (Prayag United)
- (India) Suman Pandey (Prayag United)
- (India) Deepak Kumar (Pune)
- (India) Gobin Singh (Pune)
- (India) Thongkhosiem Haokip (Pune)
- (India) Rupert Nongrum (Shillong Lajong)
- (India) Shaiborlang Kharpan (Shillong Lajong)
- (India) Jacob Lalrawngbawla (Shillong Lajong)
- (India) Jagganath Oraon (Prayag United)

=== Group stage ===
==== Leading scorers ====
Updated 28 April 2012

Total	Player		Club	Goals per Game			
Total	Player		Club	1	2	3	4
6	(India)	Romeo Fernandes	Dempo	4	1	1	X
4	(India)	Thongkosiem Haokip	Pune	3	1		
3	(India)	Pritam Ningthoujam	Sporting Clube de Goa	1	1	1	X
3	(India)	Jayesh Rane	Mumbai		2	1	
3	(India)	Thangjam Meetie	Pune	1	1		1
3	(India)	William Lalnunfela	Pune		1	1	1
2	(India)	Joalan Fernandes	Sporting Clube de Goa	2			X
2	(India)	Fanai Lalrempuia	Pune	1		1	
2	(India)	Richard Costa	Churchill Brothers		2		X
2	(India)	Rahul Raj	Chirag United Kerala			2	
2	(India)	Chetan Tandel	Mumbai	1	1		

Player's team did not have a game in Round 4

==== Other scorers ====
1 goal

- Prakash Khatti (Air India)
- (India) Melvin Fernandez (Churchill Brothers)
- (India) Sanju Kumar (HAL)
- (India) David Lalbiakzara (Pune)
- (India) Jagannath Oraw (Prayag United)
- (India) Shaiborlong (Shillong Lajong)
- (India) Mohammed Ali (Sporting Clube de Goa)
- (India) Budhiram Tudu (East Bengal)
- (India) Wasim Mallick (East Bengal)
- (India) Godfrey Silva (Salgaocar)
- (India) Anoop Pauly (Chirag United Kerala)
- (India) Altamash Sayed (Mumbai)
- Sagar Bedekar (Air India)
- (India) Serotorio (Dempo)
- (India) Rickey Jonunmawaya (Mohun Bagan)
- (India) Dexter Rodrigues (Mumbai)
- (India) Rajen Burman (Prayag United)
- (India) Charles Cardozo (Sporting Clube de Goa)
- (India) Nickson Castanha (Sporting Clube de Goa)
- (India) Xavier Dias (Sporting Clube de Goa)
- (India) Seminlen Doungel (East Bengal)
- (India) Redeem Tlang (Shillong Lajong)
- (India) Deepak Kumar (Pune)
- Siddharth Nayak (Air India)
- (India) Sunil Kumar (HAL)

== See also ==
- I-League
