= DSK Shivajians FC =

Former Indian association football club

DSK Shivajians
- Full name: DSK Shivajians Football Club
- Nickname: The Shivajians
- Short name: DSFC
- Founded: 1987; 39 years ago (as Shivajians Sports Club)
- Dissolved: 2017; 9 years ago
- Ground: Shree Shiv Chhatrapati Sports Complex
- Capacity: 11,900
- Owner: DSK Group

DSK Shivajians Football Club (founded as Shivajians Sports Club) was an Indian professional football club based in Pune, Maharashtra. The club was owned by the DSK Group, and competed in the I-League, then top tier of Indian football league system. It has also participated in Pune Football League.

The club was founded as in 1987 in Shivajinagar, Pune, by Ashok Vanjari, Manoj Walvekar, Emanuel Jeevan, Moreshwar Dhumal, Viju Deshmukh and Frank Norman as a platform for entertainment and community engagement for the residents of the locality. The Club have played in the top tier of the Pune Football League since their formation in 1987, and have played the I-League from 2015–16 season. A direct entry into the League, and therefore were immune to relegation until 2018. The club is known for its youth development policy and was the first professional football club in India to have tied up with a major international football club in Liverpool FC, along with whom they run their academy.

== History ==
=== The early years: 1987–1989 ===
The club was formed on 6 August 1987, under the name Shivajians Sports Club, by the Late. Ashok Vanjari, Manoj Walvekar, Emanuel Jeevan, Moreshwar (Appa) Dhumal, Viju Deshmukh and Frank Norman. A community club, it served as a platform for competition, entertainment and engagement for locals from the Shivajinagar area in Pune. The club was affiliated with Pune District Football Association.

In 1987 itself, the club organized the first ever All India Floodlight Football Tournament, which was held in Pune in the memory of Shri B. B. Walvekar. Teams such as Central Railway zone – Bombay, Madras Tukes, Bank Of India – Bombay, Sesa Goa, State Bank of India – Hyderabad, Salsete Goa, Kampti Colonies – Nagpur, Bangalore Eleven, Kerala Police and Cochin Customs which were forces to be reckoned with in the country at the time, all participated in the tournament.

=== Two decades of local dominence: 1990–2010 ===
From 1990 until 2010, the club had dominated the Pune football scene. In this period, the club won all the prestigious tournaments held in Pune, including the Dr. Hedgewar Football Tournament, Raja Shiv Chhatrapati Football Tournament, Rupmay Chatterjee Football Tournament, Dada Saheb Chavan Memorial Cup and Guru Teg Bahadur Football Tournament. The club also won many state level and all India level football tournaments held in the nearby cities of Kolhapur, Gadhinglaj, Miraj, Indore and Akola.

Staying true to their goal of engaging the community, the Club organised many training programmes and provided scholarships to players from the economically weaker sections of society.

=== Change of ownership and DSK Shivajians FC: 2010–present ===
On 30 April 2010, Shirish Kulkarni, executive director of the DSK Group and former Shivajians SC player, was appointed as the president of the club. This was a prelude to the DSK Group's takeover of the club in 2013, which led to it being renamed as "DSK Shivajians FC".

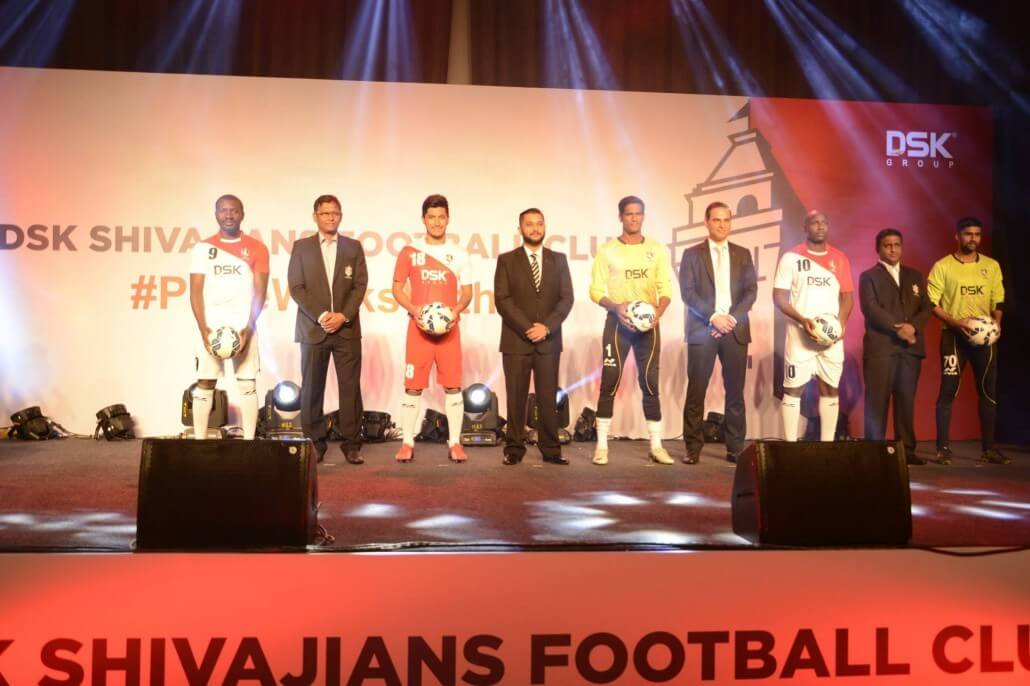
DSK Shivajians unveiling new club kits and players on 24 October 2016.

The DSK Group has invested heavily in developing infrastructure for the Club at the DSK Dream City Football Fields in Pune, where they created a state-of-the-art fully residential training facility which also houses the DSK Shivajians FC Academy, which is run in association with Liverpool FC.

In 2013, the Club played the I-League 2nd Division under Coach Pradhyum Reddy, but missed out on the Final Round by a point. They have also participated in the 2016 Durand Cup and reached the semifinals after finishing on top of the Group A with 10 points. Their campaign came to an end after losing to NEROCA FC by 3–0 in the first semifinals.

In 2015, the club got corporate entry into the I-League. Under the coaching of Derrick Pereira, they played in the 2015–16 I-League Season. In November 2016, Bosnian international Saša Kolunija was roped in as the first foreign signing. They finished 9th on the league table with 15 points.

In the 2016–17 I-League, DSK Shivajians participated for the last time before they pulled out their team and ended on 18 points, finishing on seventh position.

== Dysfunction ==
Shivajians, in existence since 1987, is what the city can, and has, referred to as its legacy team; a team from the grassroots of Pune that went from local division to local division to state and finally to the I-League, India's official premier league of football. Shivajians lasted two seasons in the I-league; 2015–16 and 2016–17 with a seventh place being their highest finish. Then the DSK financial tsunami hit the club and Shivajians could no longer afford to be in the domestic top tier.

Head of the academy, Deggie Cardozo, explains that the motivation of players has continued to remain the same. In his words; "The lads are still training with the same level of intensity and are giving it their all to better their performances, and also the team as a whole."

The club got dissolved in 2017 after announcing their pullout from the 2016–17 I-League Season.

== Stadium ==
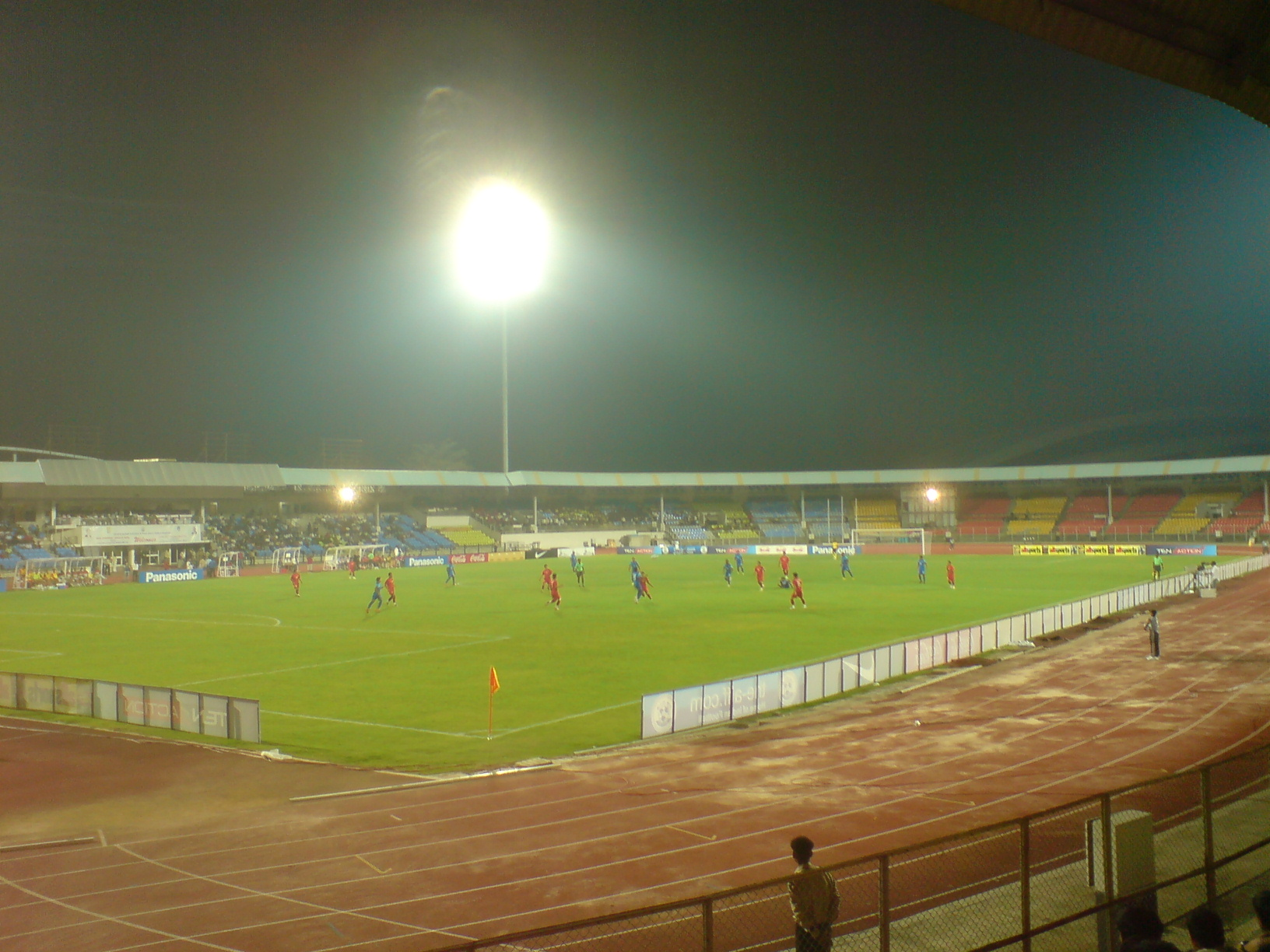
Shiv Chatrapati Sports Complex, home of DSK Shivajians.

The club used Balewadi Sports Complex Stadium as their home ground for the matches of I-League, and Pune Football League. The stadium has a capacity of nearly 10,000 spectators.

The club trained at the DSK Dream City Football Fields in Loni Kalbhor.

== Kit manufacturers and shirt sponsors ==
Period	Kit manufacturer	Shirt sponsor
2015–2017	Nivia Sports	DSK Group

== Notable players ==
For all current and former notable players of DSK Shivajians with a Wikipedia article, see: DSK Shivajians FC players.

=== Past internationals ===
The following foreign player(s) of DSK Shivajians, have been capped at senior/youth international level. Years in brackets indicate their spells at the club.

- (Liberia) Melvin Tarley (2012–2013)
- (North Korea) Kim Song-yong (2014–2015)
- (Afghanistan) Zohib Islam Amiri (2015–2016)
- (France) Jérémy Labor (2016)
- (Republic of Ireland) Shane McFaul (2016–2017)

== Affiliated clubs ==
The following club was formerly affiliated with DSK Shivajians:

- (England) Liverpool FC (2013–2015)

== Partnership and academy ==
English club Liverpool announced a partnership with DSK Shivajians in India to start their international football academy, with the partnership pertinent in the academy setup only, with academy players trained by coaches representing Liverpool playing for DSK Shivajians U18s. DSK Shivajians' U18 team played in the I-League U18, and the 2014–15 U19 I-League was the first time they were involved in national-level youth team football. Club's U-19 team participated in Maharashtra zone of 2014 I-League U19. partnering Liverpool, and played in the Maharashtra Zone of the league. Their U15 team competed in Nike Premier Cup.

DSK Shivajians had its reserve side that participated in the PDFA 1st Division League. They also took part in 2012 edition of Kedari Redekar Football Tournament in Bengaluru. The club also incorporated DSK Cup for youth development, and hosted the tournament in DSK Dream City.

== Honours ==
=== League ===
- Pune Football League
  - Champions (Record 22): 1989, 1990, 1991, 1992, 1993, 1994, 1995, 1996, 1997, 1998, 1999, 2000, 2001, 2002, 2003, 2004, 2005, 2006, 2007, 2008, 2008, 2009, 2010, 2016

=== Cup ===
- B.B. Walvekar All India Floodlight Football Tournament
  - Champions (1): 1987
- Guru Teg Bahadur Football Tournament
  - Champions (4): 1990, 1992, 1993, 2000
- VOBA Invitational Tournament (Div II)
  - Champions (1): 2014
- VOBA Invitational Tournament (Div III)
  - Champions (1): 2014
- Gadhinglaj United Cup
  - Champions (1): 2015
- DSK Invitational Cup
  - Champions (2): 2014, 2015
- Cantonment Trophy
  - Runners-up (1): 1990
- PCMC Mayor's All India Football Trophy
  - Third Place (2): 1987, 1989

== See also ==
- List of football clubs in Maharashtra
- Sports in Maharashtra
