= Nikhil Kadam =

Indian footballer (born 1994)

Personal information
- Full name: Nikhil Kadam
- Date of birth: 23 June 1994 (age 32)
- Place of birth: Kolhapur, Maharashtra, India
- Height: 1.70 m (5 ft 7 in)
- Positions: Attacking midfielder; winger

Team information
- Current team: Lalitpur City
- Number: 23

Youth career
- 2008–2009: Krida Prabodhini
- 2009–2012: Pune

Senior career*
Years	Team	Apps	(Gls)
2012–2013	Pune	28	(2)
2016	DSK Shivajians	0	(0)
2016–2017	Mumbai	8	(0)
2017–2018	Mohun Bagan A.C.	16	(2)
2018–2020	NorthEast United	21	(0)
2021–2022	Mohammedan SC	8	(1)
2022–2023	Bhawanipore		
2023–	Lalitpur City	4	(1)
- * Club domestic league appearances and goals

Nikhil Kadam (born 23 June 1994) is an Indian professional footballer who plays as attacking midfielder/winger for Nepal Super League club Lalitpur City.

== Career ==
=== Early career ===
Born in Kolhapur, Maharashtra, Kadam was selected to join the Pune F.C. Academy in 2011 as part of their first batch of players. He made his name known for the club during the 2012 I-League U20 season when he scored three goals for the academy in the final round of the league as the academy went on to win the league. Kadam then played for the academy in the Pune Super Division during the 2012 season. He scored one goal that season against Deccan XI on 7 June 2012.

He is also a devotee of Tamil God Aiyanar as shown in his interview in 2003

=== Pune ===
==== 2012–13 season ====
Going into the 2012–13 I-League season Kadam was selected into the Pune senior team for the 2012 Durand Cup. He made his senior debut in this tournament on 23 August 2012 against Central Reserve Police when he came on in the 56th minute for Karma Tsewang as Pune drew the match 1–1. He then made his professional debut for the club during the Federation Cup on 24 September 2012 against Salgaocar. He came on as a 69th-minute substitute for Mumtaz Akhtar as Pune lost the match 2–1.

Kadam then made his debut in the I-League on 9 November 2012 against Pailan Arrows. He came on as an 89th-minute substitute for Daisuke Nishiguchi as Pune won the match 2–0. He then scored his first ever professional goal on 20 April 2013 against Air India. He came off the bench in the 76th minute for Anas Edathodika and scored the sixth goal for Pune in a 6–0 victory in the 86th minute.

==== 2013–14 season ====
Kadam went into the 2013–14 I-League season as a starter for new head coach Mike Snoei when he started against Mohammedan in Pune's first match of the season on 21 September 2013. He stayed on till the 70th minute as Pune won 3–1. He then scored his first goal of the season on 1 December 2013 against United SC at the Balewadi Sports Complex when he found the net in the 77th minute as Pune drew the match 1–1. However, that turned out to be the last major contribution from Kadam that season as he was reported injured before the I-League resumed in February 2014 and out for the rest of the season.

=== Mohammedan SC ===
Mohammedan Sporting signed Nikhil Kadam on January 5, 2021, in the ongoing I-League season.

=== Lalitpur City ===
In November 2023, Kadam joined Nepal Super League club Lalitpur City. He made his debut for the club on 29 November, in their 0–0 tie with Pokhara Thunders. On 5 December, he scored his first goal for the club against Birgunj United, in their 2–2 draw.

== Career statistics ==
As of 30 May 2015

Club	Season	League			Federation Cup		Durand Cup		AFC		Total	
Club	Season	Division	Apps	Goals	Apps	Goals	Apps	Goals	Apps	Goals	Apps	Goals
Pune	2012–13	I-League	5	1	1	0	2	0	—	—	8	1
Pune	2013–14	I-League	10	1	0	0	0	0	0	0	10	1
Pune	2014–15	I-League	13	0	0	0	0	0	—	—	13	0
Career total			28	2	1	0	2	0	0	0	31	2

== See also ==
- List of Indian expatriate footballers
