= Pune FC Academy =

Pune Academy
- Full name: Pune Football Club Academy
- Nickname(s): Red Lizards
- Founded: 2011
- Dissolved: 2016
- Ground: Pune FC Training Ground, Mamurdi, Pune
- League: I-League U19
- 2014: Group Stage (Maharashtra Zone)
Home colours	Away colours	Third colours

The Pune Football Club Academy was the youth team of Pune Football Club. They played in the I-League U19, the highest level of youth football in India. The team closed operations in 2016 and were purchased by Indian Super League side FC Pune City, and rebranded it as the FC Pune City Academy.

== History ==
Pune had always operated a U19 and U17 youth team since their inception in 2007 but on 23 June 2011 it was announced that the club would open an Academy at the U20 level, thus becoming the first I-League team to do so. The initial trials for the Academy were held in Pune and were attended by around 280 hopefuls. Out of the 280 players only 25 passed the trial while five extra players were called up from the then-Pune Under-19 squad, thus creating the first group of 30 players for the 2011–12 season. The clubs first tournament was the Peninsula Pune Cup which was held in September 2011 and was a pre-season tournament for Pune, Air India, and Deccan XI. The Academies first match since founding was during that tournament on 10 September against Air India. The match ended 2–1 in favor of Air India. The Pune Academy then played their first ever foreign tournament in January 2012 when they participated in the Aaha Rara Gold Cup. They however only made the semi-finals after losing to Samsung Jawalakhel 4–0.

The Academy then participated for the first time in the 2012 I-League U20 which is the official youth tournament of the I-League. Their first match was against HAL on 20 April 2012; Pune won 5–1. The team then went on to win the I-League U20 after winning all 9 matches to go undefeated.

In 2013, the Academy won the U20 league again. This time in the final round the Pune Academy grabbed 13 points from five matches to finish on top.

On 26 August 2016, it was announced that FC Pune City of the Indian Super League had taken over the Pune FC Academy and will rebrand it under their name.

== Head coaches ==
- (India) Gift Raikhan (2011–2013)
- (India) Naushad Moosa (2013–2016)

== Honours ==
- I-League U20
  - Champions (2): 2012, 2013
- Kedari Redekar Football Tournament
  - Runners-up (1): 2012

== Notable graduates ==
This is a list of former academy graduates who have either played a match professional with Pune F.C. or any other club professionally.

- (India) Amrinder Singh
- (India) Denechandra Meitei
- (India) Dhanpal Ganesh
- (India) Fanai Lalrempuia
- (India) Nikhil Kadam
- (India) Salam Ranjan Singh
- (India) Thongkhosiem Haokip
- (India) Syed Shoaib Ahmed
