= Youth League (India) =

Youth football league system in India

- Founded: 2008; 18 years ago
- Country: India
- Divisions: AIFF Youth League; Junior League; Sub-Junior League
- Number of clubs: 121 (AIFF Youth League); 47 (Junior League); 49 (Sub-Junior League)
- Level on pyramid: 1
- Current champions: Youth: Punjab; Junior: Punjab; Sub-Junior: Minerva Academy FC
- Most championships: Youth:AIFF Elite Academy (3 titles); Junior: Minerva Academy (4 titles); Sub-Junior: Minerva Academy (4 titles)
- Website: www.the-aiff.com
- Current: 2025–26

The Youth League is a system of youth football leagues that are managed, organised and controlled by the All India Football Federation. It consists of 3 age groups competitions: U17 (AIFF Youth League), U15 (Junior League) and U13 (Sub-Junior League).

== History ==
The league was founded as the I-League U19 in 2008, which was to give youth teams of the I-League a national league to play in. 16 teams were split into four groups of four. At the end of the season, the top team from the group stage would move onto the final stage with the other group winners, and play each other once. The inaugural winners were Tata Football Academy.

The competition name was changed in 2012 to the I-League U-20, because many U-20 players in the I-League were not getting any time in the senior teams.

The U20 name only lasted for two seasons, before the All India Football Federation decided to switch the tournament format back to an under-19 format from 2014. From 2014, the tournament was divided into five zones, namely Kolkata, Mumbai, Shillong, Goa and Rest of India.

The competition once again changed format in 2015–16, played as U18 tournament. From 2017–18 season, the league was renamed as Youth League U18 and subsequently as Elite League from 2018–19.

== Structure ==
For younger categories, in most cases teams play each other in their respective zonal groups twice – home and away. At the end of the group stage, the top two teams go through to the final phase.

Those teams are divided into three groups and the group champions, along with the best second placed teams, qualify for the knockout stages.

For Youth League, the latest tournament took place across ten venues, with single round-robin format in the group and knockout stage. The 49 teams from 29 states and union territories were divided in ten groups.

== Winners ==
Season	I-League U19	-	
2008	Tata Football Academy	-	
2010	sporting Goa	-	
2011	JCT	-	
Season	I-League U20	-	
2012	Pune	-	
2013	Pune	-	
Season	I-League U19	-	
2014	Tata Football Academy	-	
2014–15	AIFF Elite Academy	-	
Season	I-League U18	I-League U15	-
2015–16	AIFF Elite Academy	Minerva Punjab	-
2016–17	AIFF Elite Academy	Minerva Punjab	-
Season	Youth League U18/Elite League U18	U-15 Junior League	U-13 Sub-Junior League
2017–18	Shillong Lajong	Minerva Punjab	Minerva Punjab
2018–19	Minerva Punjab	Minerva Punjab	RF Young Champs
2019–20	called off due to COVID-19 pandemic		
Season	U17 Youth Cup	-	
2022–23	Classic Football Academy	-	
Season	U-17 Youth League	U-15 Junior League	U-13 Sub-Junior League
2023–24	Classic Football Academy	RF Young Champs	Minerva Academy
2024–25	Punjab	Punjab	Minerva Academy
Season	U-18 Youth Elite League	U-15 Junior League	U-13 Sub-Junior League
2025–26	Punjab	Punjab	Minerva Academy

=== Performance by Clubs ===
Team	Titles						
Team	Total	U20 titles	U19 titles	U18 titles	U17 titles	U15 titles	U13 titles
Minerva Academy	9	0	0	1	0	4	4
Punjab	4	0	0	1	1	2	0
AIFF Elite Academy	3	0	1	2	0	0	0
Pune FC Academy	2	2	0	0	0	0	0
Tata Football Academy	2	0	2	0	0	0	0
Classic FA	2	0	0	0	2	0	0
RF Young Champs	2	0	0	0	0	1	1
JCT	1	0	1	0	0	0	0
Sporting Goa	1	0	1	0	0	0	0
Shillong Lajong	1	0	0	1	0	0	0

== Under-17/18 level ==
The Youth League or the AIFF Elite Youth League was previously known as Hero U-17 Youth Cup, I-League U18, I-League U19 and I-League U20. is the top level of youth football in India. It is contested between the under-18 sides of The I-League teams, Indian Super League teams, as well as other youth teams. The most successful team currently is AIFF Elite Academy, who won three titles. Minerva Punjab are the defending champions.

On 7 December 2018 AIFF decided to change its name to Hero Elite League.

== Under-15 level (9-a-side) ==
Junior League or AIFF Junior League is the under-15 level of youth football in India.

== Under-13 level (9-a-side) ==
Sub-Junior League or Hero Sub-Junior League is the under-13 level of youth football in India.

== Women's ==
The AIFF Women's Youth League, under the U17 level was initiated in 2026. It is the top level of women's youth football in India. It was followed by the U15 level.

U17 Women's Youth League
Season	Winners	Runners-up	Ref.
2026–27	HOPS	Nita	

U15 Women's Youth League
Season	Winners	Runners-up	Ref.
2026–27	Sethu	HOPS	

== See also ==
- Junior National Football Championship
- Football in India
- Indian football league system
- History of Indian football
- Reliance Foundation Development League
- Indian Arrows
- Subroto Cup
- Seven-a-side football
