= Tata Football Academy =

Indian association football academy in Jamshedpur

- Full name: Tata Football Academy
- Nickname: TFA
- Founded: 1987; 39 years ago
- Ground: JRD Tata Sports Complex; Tinplate Sports Complex
- Capacity: 24,424; 5,000
- League: Development League (Note: The players participate as a part of the Jamshedpur FC's youth team.); Indian Elite League U–18; Indian Elite League U–15; Indian Elite League U–13
- Website: www.tatafootballacademy.com

Tata Football Academy (Tata FA or TFA) is a football academy based in Jamshedpur, Jharkhand, sponsored by Tata Steel, which formerly owned ISL outfit Jamshedpur FC. It is one of the renowned and leading football academies in the country.

== History ==
Jamsetji Nusserwanji Tata envisaged not only Asia's first fully integrated Steel Plant but also the model township of Jamshedpur. He advised his son, Sir Dorab Tata, to earmark "areas for Football, hockey and Parks... ". Tata Steel's commitment to sports, in fact, preceded the building of the township. The aforesaid letter was written in 1902 and the site for Jamshedpur selected in 1907.

Indian footballers Chuni Goswami and Arun Ghosh served as directors of TFA from 1986 to 1989, 1989 to 1997 and 1997 to 2003 respectively.

In November 2017, it was announced that TFA will tie-up with La Liga giants Atlético Madrid, to enhance and strengthen its existing programmes for promoting Indian football. It was also announced that, TFA is to be renamed as Tata Atletico Football Academia.

In March 2019, Carlos Santamarina was appointed as the head coach of TFA. Santamarina has been involved with Atlético Madrid's youth coaching set up, which includes development and coaching of kids in the age group of U-15, U-14, U-13 and U-12.

== Honours ==
=== Domestic competitions ===
- National Football League II
  - Champions (1): 2005–06
- I-League U19
  - Champions (2): 2014, 2008
  - Runners-up (1): 2013
- IFA Shield
  - Champions (1): 2016
- Sikkim Governor's Gold Cup
  - Champions (1): 2003
- Independence Day Cup
  - Runners-up (1): 1999
- Bordoloi Trophy
  - Champions (1): 2000
- All Airlines Gold Cup
  - Runners-up (1): 1991
- Lal Bahadur Shastri Cup
  - Champions (1): 2004
- Darjeeling Gold Cup
  - Champions (1): 2011
- Hot Weather Football Championship
  - Runners-up (1): 2004
- Delhi Lt. Governor's Cup
  - Champions (1): 2005
- All India Sambalpur Gold Cup
  - Runners-up (1): 2009

== Partnerships ==
- (Spain) Atlético Madrid (until 2011)
- (England) Sheffield United F.C. (2011–?)

== See also ==
- Jamshedpur FC
