= 2025–26 FC Goa season =

2025–26 season of FC Goa

FC Goa
2025–26 season
- Owner: Goan Football; Club Pvt. Ltd.
- President: Akshay Tandon
- Head Coach: (Spain) Manolo Márquez
- Stadium: Fatorda Stadium (Capacity : 19,000)
- Indian Super League: 7th
- Super Cup: Champions
- ACL Two: Group stage
- Biggest win: 3–0 vs Inter Kashi (AIFF Super Cup)
- Biggest defeat: 0–4 vs (Saudi Arabia) Al-Nassr (ACL Two)
Home colours	Away colours	Third colours

The 2025–26 FC Goa season is the club's 12th season since its establishment in 2014 as well as their 12th season in 2025–26 Indian Super League. In addition to the league, they will also compete in the 2025–26 AIFF Super Cup and 2025–26 ACL Two.

== Team management ==
=== Current technical staff ===
Role	Name	Refs.
Head coach	(Spain) Manolo Márquez	
Assistant coach	(Argentina) Benito Montalvo	
Assistant coach	(India) Gouramangi Singh	
Goalkeeping coach	(Spain) Marc Gamon	
Strength & conditioning coach		
Head of performance analysis	(India) Joy Gabriel M.	

=== Management ===
Position	Name
CEO	(India) Ravi Puskur
Head of technical operations	(India) Jonathan D'Souza
Technical director	(India) Derrick Pereira
Team manager	(India) Dion Pinto

== Players ==
=== First-team squad ===
As of 17 September 2025

Note: Flags indicate national team as defined under FIFA eligibility rules; some limited exceptions apply. Players may hold more than one non-FIFA nationality.

No.	Pos.	Nation	Player
3	DF	IND	Sandesh Jhingan (Captain)
4	DF	ESP	Pol Moreno
9	FW	ESP	Javier Siverio
10	MF	IND	Mohammad Yasir
13	GK	IND	Lara Sharma
14	MF	IND	Ayush Chhetri
15	MF	IND	Sahil Tavora
17	MF	IND	Boris Singh Thangjam
18	DF	IND	Jerry Lalrinzuala
20	DF	IND	Seriton Fernandes
21	MF	IND	Udanta Singh Kumam
22	MF	IND	Prachit Vishwas
23	MF	IND	Harsh Patre

No.	Pos.	Nation	Player
26	MF	ESP	Borja Herrera
27	DF	IND	Aakash Sangwan
30	DF	IND	Nim Dorjee Tamang
34	FW	ESP	Iker Guarrotxena
35	DF	IND	Ronney Willson Kharbudon
42	MF	IND	Brison Fernandes
44	MF	IND	Muhammed Nemil
45	GK	IND	Bob Jackson
55	GK	IND	Hrithik Tiwari
71	FW	SRB	Dejan Dražić
77	FW	IND	Abdul Rabeeh

== Friendlies ==
FC Goa will play Mohun Bagan in a friendly at Kolkata on Sept 9, ahead of their 2025–26 AFC Champions League Two Campaign.

9 September 2025	Mohun Bagan	0–0	FC Goa	Kolkata, West Bengal
10:00 IST				Stadium: Kishore Bharati Krirangan

== Competitions ==
=== Overall record ===
Competition	First match	Last match	Starting round	Final position	Record							
Competition	First match	Last match	Starting round	Final position	Pld	W	D	L	GF	GA	GD	Win %
ISL	14 February 2026	18 May 2026	Matchday 1	7th	13	5	5	3	15	11	+4	38.46
ACL2	13 August 2025	24 December 2025	Preliminary stage	Group Stage	7	1	0	6	5	15	−10	14.29
Super Cup	26 October 2025	7 December 2025	Group Stage	Champions	5	3	1	1	8	3	+5	60.00
Total					25	9	6	10	28	29	−1	36.00

Source: Soccerway

=== Indian Super League ===
==== League table ====
Pos	Team	Pld	W	D	L	GF	GA	GD	Pts	Qualification
5	Jamshedpur	13	6	4	3	15	10	+5	22 (Note: Head-to-head points: Jamshedpur 3, Punjab 0.)	
6	Punjab	13	6	4	3	18	12	+6	22	
7	Goa	13	5	5	3	15	11	+4	20	Qualification for the Champions League Two qualifying playoffs (Note: Goa qualified for the AFC Champions League Two qualifying playoffs as the 2025–26 AIFF Super Cup winners.)
8	Kerala Blasters	13	5	2	6	15	17	−2	17	
9	NorthEast United	13	4	4	5	16	21	−5	16	

Source: Indian Super League
Rules for classification: 1) points; 2) goal difference; 3) number of goals scored; 4) head-to-head points; 5) head-to-head goal difference; 6) head-to-head goals scored; 7) fair play ranking; 8) drawing of lots.
(Note: Head-to-head record is used only after all the matches between the teams in question have been played).

==== Results summary ====
Overall								Home						Away					
Pld	W	D	L	GF	GA	GD	Pts	W	D	L	GF	GA	GD	W	D	L	GF	GA	GD
0	0	0	0	0	0	0	0	0	0	0	0	0	0	0	0	0	0	0	0

Source: Indian Super League

==== Matches ====
Win Draw Loss Void

=== AIFF Super Cup ===
Group stage

Pos	Team	Pld	W	D	L	GF	GA	GD	Pts	Qualification	GOA	NEU	JFC	INK
1	Goa (H)	3	2	0	1	6	2	+4	6	Advance to knockout stage		1–2	2–0	3–0
2	NorthEast United	3	1	2	0	6	5	+1	5				2–2	2–2
3	Jamshedpur	3	1	1	1	4	4	0	4					2–0
4	Inter Kashi	3	0	1	2	2	7	−5	1					

Source: AIFF
Legend: Blue = home team win; Yellow = draw; Red = away team win.
Rules for classification: 1)1) points; 2) head-to-head points; 3) head-to-head goal difference; 4) goal difference; 5) number of goals scored; 6) Penalty shoot-out if only two teams are tied and they met in the last round of the group; 7) Disciplinary points; 8) drawing of lots
(H) Hosts

==== Matches ====
Win Draw Loss Void

26 October 2025 Group Stage	Goa	2–0	Jamshedpur	Margao, Goa
19:30 IST	Siverio 45'; Drazic 66'	I-League; PDF Report		Stadium: Jawaharlal Nehru Stadium; Attendance: 327; Referee: Venkatesh Ramachandran; Man of the Match: Dejan Drazic (Goa)

29 October 2025 Group Stage	Goa	3–0	Inter Kashi	Margao, Goa
19:30 IST	Dražić 4'; Borja 38', 42'	I-League; PDF Report		Stadium: Jawaharlal Nehru Stadium; Attendance: 893; Referee: Ashwin; Man of the Match: Borja Herrera (Goa)

1 November 2025 Group Stage	Goa	1–2	North East	Margao, Goa
19:30 IST	Sahil 72'	I-League; PDF Report	Chema 68'; Robin Yadav 77'	Stadium: Jawaharlal Nehru Stadium; Attendance: 1,723; Referee: Crystal John; Man of the Match: Dipesh Chauhan (NorthEast United)

Knockout stage

Semifinals
A1	East Bengal	3
C1	Punjab	1
B1	Goa	2
D1	Mumbai City	1

Final
SF1	East Bengal	0 (5)
SF2	Goa (p)	0 (6)

4 December 2025 Semi-final	Goa	2–1	Mumbai City	Margao, Goa
19:30 IST	Brison 20'; Timor 23'	I-League; PDF Report	Brandon 59'	Stadium: Jawaharlal Nehru Stadium; Attendance: 5,000; Referee: Pratik Mondal; Man of the Match: David Timor (Goa)

7 December 2025 Final	East Bengal	0–0 (a.e.t.) (5–6 p)	Goa	Margao, Goa
19:30 IST		I-League; PDF Report		Stadium: Jawaharlal Nehru Stadium; Attendance: 9,400; Referee: Harish Kundu; Man of the Match: Hrithik Tiwari (Goa)
	Penalties
	Sibille (penalty scored); Saúl (penalty scored); Miguel (penalty scored); Rashid (penalty missed); A. Ali (penalty scored); Ahadad (penalty scored); PV Vishnu (penalty missed)		(penalty missed) Borja; (penalty scored) Siverio; (penalty scored) Dejan; (penalty scored) Nemil; (penalty scored) Timor; (penalty scored) Udanta; (penalty scored) Tavora

=== AFC Champions League Two ===
==== Matches ====
Win Draw Loss Void

Qualifying play-offs

13 August 2025 Preliminary stage	Goa (India)	2–1	(Oman) Al-Seeb	Goa, India
19:30 IST	Dražić 24'; Siverio 52'	Report	Nasser 60'	Stadium: Jawaharlal Nehru Stadium; Attendance: 12,314; Referee: Zhang Lei (China)

Group stage
(Group D)

Pos	Team	Pld	W	D	L	GF	GA	GD	Pts	Qualification	NSR	ZWR	IST	GOA
1	(Saudi Arabia) Al-Nassr	6	6	0	0	22	2	+20	18	Advance to round of 16	—	5–1	5–0	4–0
2	(Iraq) Al-Zawraa	6	3	0	3	8	11	−3	9	Advance to round of 16	0–2	—	2–1	2–1
3	(Tajikistan) Istiklol	6	3	0	3	7	13	−6	9		0–4	2–1	—	2–0
4	(India) Goa	6	0	0	6	3	14	−11	0		1–2	0–2	1–2	—

Source: ACL2
Rules for classification: Tiebreakers

17 September 2025 Group Stage	Goa (India)	0–2	(Iraq) Zawraa	Goa, India
19:30 IST		Report	Bani Hani 44'; Al-Rashdan 90+5'	Stadium: Jawaharlal Nehru Stadium; Attendance: 8,756; Referee: Baraa Aisha (Palestine)

1 October 2025 Group Stage	Istiklol (Tajikistan)	2–0	(India) Goa	Hisor, Tajikistan
19:15 IST	Soirov 46'; Dehghani 74'	Report		Stadium: Hisor Central Stadium; Attendance: 5,750; Referee: Thoriq Alkatiri (Indonesia)

22 October 2025 Group Stage	Goa (India)	1–2	(Saudi Arabia) Al-Nassr	Goa, India
19:30 IST	Fernandes 41'	Report	Ângelo 10'; Camara 27'	Stadium: Jawaharlal Nehru Stadium; Attendance: 14,389; Referee: Adel Al-Naqbi (United Arab Emirates)

6 November 2025 Group Stage	Al-Nassr (Saudi Arabia)	4–0	(India) Goa	Riyadh, Saudi Arabia
00:15 IST	Ghareeb 35', 53'; Maran 65'; João Félix 84'	Report		Stadium: Al-Awwal Park; Attendance: 6,736; Referee: Kim Hee-gon (South Korea)

26 November 2025 Group Stage	Zawraa (Iraq)	2–1	(India) Goa	Baghdad, Iraq
21:30 IST	Raad 38'; Abdulkareem 65'	Report	Ismail 51' (o.g.)	Stadium: Al Zawraa Stadium; Attendance: 8,322; Referee: Firdavs Norsafarov (Uzbekistan)

24 December 2025 Group Stage	Goa (India)	1–2	(Tajikistan) Istiklol	Goa, India
21:30 IST	Dražić 8'	Report	Komolafe 53'; Dzhuraboev 56' (pen.)	Stadium: Jawaharlal Nehru Stadium; Attendance: 1,083; Referee: Ammar Mahfoodh (Bahrain)
