= 2025–26 Mumbai City FC season =

Mumbai City FC
2025–26 season
- Director of Football: Sujay Sharma
- Head coach: (Czech Republic) Petr Kratky
- Stadium: Mumbai Football Arena
- Indian Super League: 3rd
- Indian Super Cup: Semi-finals
- Top goalscorer: League: Lallianzuala Chhangte (4); All: Lallianzuala Chhangte, Brandon Fernandes (4)
- Highest home attendance: 3,911 vs NorthEast United, Indian Super League (1 March 2026)
- Lowest home attendance: 2,190 vs SC Delhi, Indian Super League (8 March 2026)
- Biggest win: 4–0 vs Mohammedan SC, Indian Super League (15 May 2026)
- Biggest defeat: 2–0 vs FC Goa, Indian Super League (18 April 2026)
Home colours	Away colours
- All statistics correct as of 3 June 2025.

The 2025–26 season was the twelfth season in Mumbai City FC's existence, where the club will compete in the Indian Super League and Super Cup.

== Players ==
=== First-team squad ===
As of 19 February 2026

Note: Flags indicate national team as defined under FIFA eligibility rules; some limited exceptions apply. Players may hold more than one non-FIFA nationality.

No.	Pos.	Nation	Player
1	GK	IND	Phurba Lachenpa
3	DF	IND	Valpuia
4	DF	POR	Nuno Reis
6	FW	IND	Vikram Partap Singh
7	FW	IND	Lallianzuala Chhangte (captain)
8	MF	FIN	Joni Kauko
10	MF	IND	Brandon Fernandes
11	FW	ESP	Jorge Ortiz
14	MF	IND	Lalnuntluanga Bawitlung
15	DF	IND	Sanjeev Stalin
16	MF	IND	Franklin Nazareth
17	DF	IND	Bijay Chhetri
18	DF	IND	Amandeep
20	DF	IND	Dhruv Alva

No.	Pos.	Nation	Player
22	DF	IND	Halen Nongtdu
23	GK	IND	Rehenesh TP
27	DF	IND	Nathan Rodrigues
28	FW	IND	Ayush Chhikara
30	FW	ARG	Jorge Pereyra Díaz
31	DF	IND	Akash Mishra
32	GK	IND	Ahan Prakash
36	DF	IND	Sahil Panwar
39	MF	IND	Aadil Sheikh
45	MF	IND	Zothanpuia
71	MF	IND	Ishaan Shishodia
77	MF	IND	Gyamar Nikum
92	FW	IND	Noufal PN

== Transfers ==
=== In ===
==== Transfers in ====
Date of arrival	Position	Player	Previous club	Transfer fee	Ref
8 June 2025	MF	(India) Lalnuntluanga Bawitlung	(India) Sreenidi Deccan	Free Transfer	
16 June 2025	MF	(India) Zothanpuia	(India) Aizawl	Free Transfer	
17 June 2025	FW	(Argentina) Jorge Pereyra Diaz	(India) Bengaluru	Free Transfer	
9 October 2025	DF	(India) Bijay Chhetri	(Uruguay) Colón	Free Transfer	
9 October 2025	DF	(India) Dhruv Alva	(Spain) Peña Balsamaiso	Free Transfer	
9 October 2025	DF	(India) Amandeep	(India) Mohun Bagan	Free Transfer	
5 February 2026	DF	(Portugal) Nuno Reis	(Portugal) União Santarém	Free Transfer	
5 February 2026	DF	(India) Sahil Panwar	(India) Mumbai City (Note: The club had initially released Panwar at the end of his previous contract, but later announced he had re-signed with the club. Both stints were independent of each other.)	Free transfer	
10 February 2026	MF	(Finland) Joni Kauko	(Finland) KuPS	Free transfer	

==== Loans in ====
Start Date	End Date	Position	Player	From club	Ref

=== Out ===
==== Transfers Out ====
Date of departure	Position	Player	Outgoing club	Transfer Fee	Ref
26 May 2025	MF	(Netherlands) Yoell van Nieff	(Cyprus) Anorthosis Famagusta	Free Transfer	
26 May 2025	MF	(France) Jeremy Manzorro	(Serbia) FK IMT	Free Transfer	
27 May 2025	DF	(India) Hardik Bhatt	(India) Sreenidi Deccan	Free Transfer	
27 May 2025	DF	(India) Amey Ranawade	(India) Kerala Blasters	Free Transfer	
27 May 2025	DF	(India) Prabir Das	(India) Kerala Blasters	End of loan	
27 May 2025	MF	(India) Hitesh Sharma	(India) Odisha	End of loan	
27 May 2025	FW	(India) Daniel Lalhlimpuia	(India) Jamshedpur	Free Transfer	
27 May 2025	GK	(India) Vishal Joon		Free Transfer	
28 May 2025	FW	(Greece) Nikos Karelis	(Greece) Panserraikos	Free Transfer	
28 May 2025	DF	(India) Sahil Panwar	Mumbai City (Note: The club had initially released Panwar at the end of his previous contract, but later announced he had re-signed with the club. Both stints were independent of each other.)	Free Transfer	
29 May 2025	MF	(India) Jayesh Rane	(India) Jamshedpur	Free Transfer	
29 May 2025	DF	(Syria) Thaer Krouma	(Syria) Al-Karamah	Free Transfer	
31 May 2025	FW	(India) Bipin Singh	(India) East Bengal	Free Transfer	
23 August 2025	DF	(India) Mehtab Singh	(India) Mohun Bagan	Undisclosed fee	
5 January 2026	DF	(Spain) Tiri	(Indonesia) Persijap Jepara	Free transfer	
14 January 2026	MF	(Spain) Jon Toral	(Indonesia) Persik Kediri	Free transfer	

==== Loans Out ====
Start Date	End Date	Position	Player	To club	Ref
22 July 2025	31 May 2026	MF	(India) Supratim Das	Diamond Harbour	
30 July 2025	31 May 2026	MF	(India) Seilenthang Lotjem	Namdhari	

== Personnel ==
=== Corporate ===
Position	Name
Owner(s)	Mumbai City Football India Pvt Ltd (65%); Sneha Parekh & Others (25%); Ranbir Kapoor (9%); Bimal Parekh (1%)
Chairman	
Board of directors	(India) Bimal Parekh (India) Sneha Parekh
CEO	(India) Kandarp Chandra
Head of Corporate Sales	(India) Jonathan Rego
Team manager	(India) Rocky Kalan
Marketing manager	(India) Siddharth Yadav
Assistant marketing manager	(India) Dwaipayan Ghosh
Sponsorship & sales	(India) Zain Zaidi
Finance manager	(India) Megha Srivastava
Finance controller	(India) Urvashi Champaneri

=== Technical ===
Position	Name
Head coach	(Czech Republic) Petr Kratky
Assistant coach	(India) Mohan Dass
Director of football	(India) Sujay Sharma
Team manager	(India) Rocky Kalan
Goalkeeping coach	Manish Kajania
Strength & conditioning coach	(India) Adrian Dias
Performance analyst	(India) Narendra Vakare
Performance analyst	(India) Trishit Ghosh
Physiotherapist	(India) Suhas Kandekar
Physiotherapist	(India) Akhilesh
Team doctor	(India) Simarpreet Singh Kalra
Head of rehabilitation and sports medicine	(India) Sandeep Kurale
Team photographer	
Media manager	(India) Swati Kalyadapu
Kit manager	(India) Rishi Roy
Logistics Manager	(India) Tanay Narvekar
Head of youth and grassroots development	(India) Dinesh Nair

== Competitions ==
=== Indian Super League ===
Mumbai's first game in the 2025-26 Indian Super League was against Chennaiyin FC, where the club came out with a 1-0 victory at home. Pritam Kotal's own goal for Chennaiyin was the only goal of the match. The club also won their next match away against Kerala Blasters 1-0. Forward Jorge Pereyra Diaz missed a first-half penalty, but captain Lallianzuala Chhangte scoring the winning goal early in the second half.

The club drew their next two games, 1-1 against NorthEast United, and 2-2 against SC Delhi. Both games were at home.

==== League table ====
Pos	Team	Pld	W	D	L	GF	GA	GD	Pts	Qualification
1	East Bengal (C)	13	7	5	1	30	11	+19	26	Qualification for the Champions League Two qualifying playoffs (Note: As per Article 4 of entry regulations for AFC’s club competitions, each club needs to play a minimum of 24 matches per season in the domestic top division that runs for at least eight months, to receive direct slots in AFC club competitions. Since Indian clubs will play just 13 games, the ISL winners will enter the qualifying stage of the ACL2 instead of the group stage.)
2	Mohun Bagan	13	7	5	1	23	9	+14	26	
3	Mumbai City	13	7	4	2	17	9	+8	25	
4	Bengaluru	13	6	5	2	18	12	+6	23	
5	Jamshedpur	13	6	4	3	15	10	+5	22 (Note: Head-to-head points: Jamshedpur 3, Punjab 1.)	Team withdrawn from next season

Source: Indian Super League
Rules for classification: 1) points; 2) goal difference; 3) number of goals scored; 4) head-to-head points; 5) head-to-head goal difference; 6) head-to-head goals scored; 7) fair play ranking; 8) drawing of lots.
(Note: Head-to-head record is used only after all the matches between the teams in question have been played).
(C) Champions

=== Super Cup ===
After the club confirmed their participation in the Super Cup, they were drawn in Group D alongside SC Delhi (formerly Hyderabad FC), Rajasthan United, and Kerala Blasters.

Mumbai won their first match against SC Delhi 4–1, courtesy of goals from Jorge Pereyra Diaz, Jorge Ortiz, and a brace from Vikram Partap Singh. In their next match of the competition, the club lost 1–0 to I-League team Rajasthan United after a goal from Robinson Blandón in the 43rd minute.

In the group decider, Mumbai secured a 1–0 win over Kerala Blasters courtesy of a Freddy Lallawmawma own goal in the 88th minute. This meant the club finished level on points with Kerala Blasters, but progressed to the semi-final based on head-to-head.

In the semi-finals, the club lost 2–1 to defending champions FC Goa.

Group stage

Pos	Team	Pld	W	D	L	GF	GA	GD	Pts	Qualification	MUM	KER	RAJ	DEL
1	Mumbai City	3	2	0	1	5	2	+3	6 (Note: Head-to-head points: Mumbai City 3, Kerala 0.)	Advance to knockout stage		1–0	0–1	4–1
2	Kerala Blasters	3	2	0	1	4	1	+3	6				1–0	3–0
3	Rajasthan United	3	1	1	1	3	3	0	4					2–2
4	Delhi	3	0	1	2	3	9	−6	1					

Source: AIFF
Rules for classification: 1) points; 2) head-to-head points; 3) head-to-head goal difference; 4) goal difference; 5) number of goals scored; 6) Penalty shoot-out if only two teams are tied and they met in the last round of the group; 7) Disciplinary points; 8) drawing of lots

==== Matches ====
Win Draw Loss Void

27 October 2025 Group Stage	Delhi	1–4	Mumbai City	Margao, Goa
19:30 IST	Alba 75' (pen.)	I-League; PDF Report	P. Díaz 7'; V. P. Singh 9', 90+4'; Ortiz 32'	Stadium: Jawaharlal Nehru Stadium; Attendance: 272; Referee: Pratik Mondal; Man of the Match: Vikram Partap (Mumbai City)

3 November 2025 Group Stage	Rajasthan United	1–0	Mumbai City	Margao, Goa
19:30 IST	Blandón 43'	I-League; PDF Report		Stadium: Jawaharlal Nehru Stadium; Attendance: 150; Referee: Pratik Mondal; Man of the Match: Robinson Blandón (Rajasthan)

6 November 2025 Group Stage	Mumbai City	1–0	Kerala Blasters	Margao, Goa
19:30 IST	Saheef 88' (o.g.)	I-League; PDF Report		Stadium: Jawaharlal Nehru Stadium; Attendance: 488; Referee: Harish Kundu; Man of the Match: Akash Mishra (Mumbai City)

Knockout stage

Semifinals
A1	East Bengal	3
C1	Punjab	1
B1	Goa	2
D1	Mumbai City	1

Final
SF1	East Bengal	0 (5)
SF2	Goa (p)	0 (6)

4 December 2025 Semi-final	Goa	2–1	Mumbai City	Margao, Goa
19:30 IST	Brison 20'; Timor 23'	I-League; PDF Report	Brandon 59'	Stadium: Jawaharlal Nehru Stadium; Attendance: 5,000; Referee: Pratik Mondal; Man of the Match: David Timor (Goa)
