= 2025–26 AIFF Super Cup final =

Football cup tournament final for AIFF

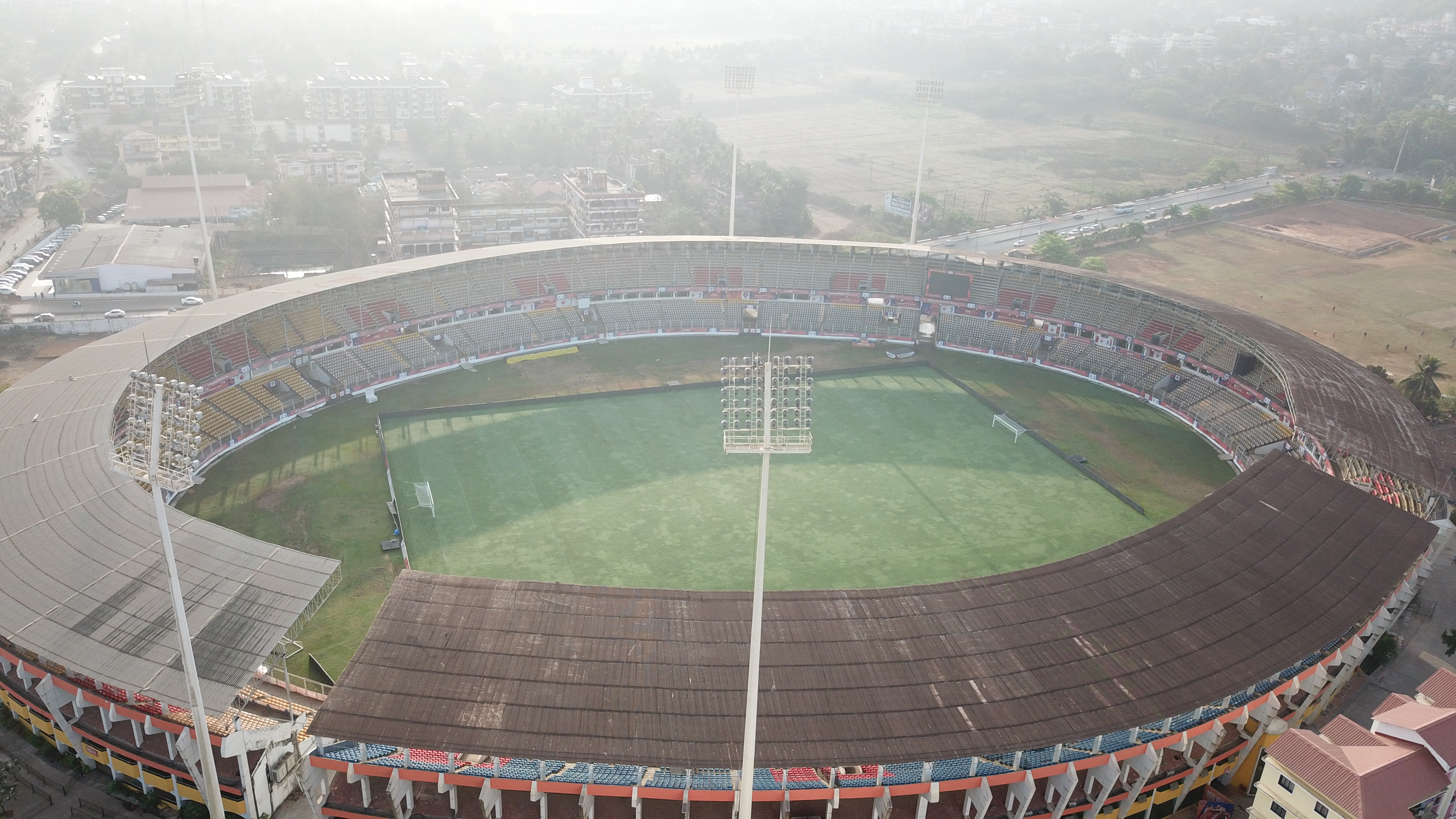
- Fatorda Stadium hosted the final on 7 December
- Event: 2025–26 AIFF Super Cup
East Bengal	FC Goa
0	0
- After extra time FC Goa won 6–5 on penalties
- Date: 7 December 2025
- Venue: Fatorda Stadium, Margao
- Player of the Match: Hrithik Tiwari (Goa)
- Referee: Harish Kundu
- Attendance: 9,400
- Weather: Warm and humid 28 °C (82 °F); 62% humidity

The 2025–26 Super Cup final was the final match of the 2025–26 AIFF Super Cup, the sixth edition of the Indian Super Cup. It was played at Fatorda Stadium in Margao on 7 December 2025 between East Bengal and Goa.

FC Goa defeated East Bengal on penalty-shootouts after the match ended in a 0–0 draw after extra time, FC Goa to win their third national cup title. As the winners, Goa have qualified for the 2026–27 AFC Champions League Two preliminary stage.

== Road to the final ==
Note: In all results below, the score of the finalist is given first.

East Bengal		Round	Goa	
Opponent	Result	Group stage	Opponent	Result
Dempo	2–2	Matchday 1	Jamshedpur	2–0
Chennaiyin	4–0	Matchday 2	Inter Kashi	3–0
Mohun Bagan	0–0	Matchday 3	NorthEast United	1–2
Group A Winners: Pos / Team / Pld / Pts; 1 / East Bengal / 3 / 5; 2 / Mohun Bagan / 3 / 5; 3 / Dempo (H) / 3 / 3; 4 / Chennaiyin / 3 / 1; Source: AIFF (H) Hosts		Final standings	Group B Winners: Pos / Team / Pld / Pts; 1 / Goa (H) / 3 / 6; 2 / NorthEast United / 3 / 5; 3 / Jamshedpur / 3 / 4; 4 / Inter Kashi / 3 / 1; Source: AIFF (H) Hosts	
Opponent	Result	Knockout stage	Opponent	Result
Punjab	3–1	Semi-finals	Mumbai City	2–1

Bracket

Semifinals
A1	East Bengal	3
C1	Punjab	1
B1	Goa	2
D1	Mumbai City	1

Final
SF1	East Bengal	0 (5)
SF2	Goa (p)	0 (6)

== Match ==
=== Details ===
7 December 2025
19:30 IST
Final

East Bengal	0–0 (a.e.t.)	Goa
	I-League; PDF Report
Penalties
Sibille (penalty scored); Saúl (penalty scored); Miguel (penalty scored); Rashid (penalty missed); A. Ali (penalty scored); Ahadad (penalty scored); PV Vishnu (penalty missed)	5–6	(penalty missed) Borja; (penalty scored) Siverio; (penalty scored) Dejan; (penalty scored) Nemil; (penalty scored) Timor; (penalty scored) Udanta; (penalty scored) Tavora

Fatorda Stadium, Fatorda
Attendance: 9,400
Referee: Harish Kundu
Man of the Match: Hrithik Tiwari (Goa)

East Bengal	Goa

Hero of the Match:
Hrithik Tiwari (Goa)

Assistant referees:
Parasuraman Vairamuthu
P. Muralitharan
Fourth official:
Aditya Purkayastha
Match commissioner:
Palliri Sujesh Rajan
Referee Assessor:
Basker Purushothaman

Match rules

- 90 minutes.
- 30 minutes of extra time if necessary.
- Penalty shoot-out if scores still level.
- Ten named substitutes
- Maximum of five substitutions, with a sixth allowed in extra time.
