= 2025–26 Chennaiyin FC season =

2024–25 season of Chennaiyin FC

Chennaiyin
2025–26 season
- Owner: Abhishek Bachchan; MS Dhoni; Vita Dani
- Head Coach: Clifford Miranda
- Stadium: Jawaharlal Nehru Stadium
- Indian Super League: 13th
- Super Cup: Group stage
- Biggest win: Chennaiyin 1–0 Delhi & Kerala Blasters (2026 ISL)
- Biggest defeat: Chennaiyin 0–4 East Bengal (2025 Super Cup)
Home colours	Away colours

The 2025–26 Chennaiyin season is the club's Twelfth season since its establishment in 2014 as well as their Twelfth season in 2025–26 Indian Super League.In addition to the league, they will also compete in the 2025–26 AIFF Super Cup edition.

== Staff Overview ==
Position	Name
Head coach	(India) Clifford Miranda
Assistant coach	(India) Noel Wilson
Goalkeeping coach	(India) Rajat Ghosh Dastidar

== Players ==
=== Squad information ===
As of 1 February 2026

Notes:

- Flags indicate national team as defined under FIFA eligibility rules. Players may hold more than one non-FIFA nationality.
- All players in this Squad were part of Indian Super League
- Chennaiyin FC Squad for Super Cup included only 24 players among this original Squad
- * denotes a player who left on Winter transfer window.
- * denotes a player who joined on Winter transfer window.

No.	Name	Nationality	Position(s)	Date of birth (age)	Signed from
Goalkeepers
1	Samik Mitra	(India)	GK	1 December 2000 (age 25)	(India) Indian Arrows
13	Mohammad Nawaz	(India)	GK	21 January 2000 (age 26)	(India) Mumbai City FC
24	Mohanraj K	(India)	GK	26 April 2004 (age 22)	(India) Chennaiyin FC II
Defenders
4	Laldinpuia	(India)	CB/RB	29 November 1996 (age 29)	(India) Jamshedpur FC
5	Elsinho	(Brazil)	CB/DM	10 April 1991 (age 35)	(India) Jamshedpur FC
6	Ankit Mukherjee	(India)	RB/CB	10 June 1996 (age 30)	(India) East Bengal FC
17	Mandar Rao Dessai	(India)	LB	18 March 1992 (age 34)	(India) East Bengal FC
20	Pritam Kotal	(India)	CB/RB	8 September 1993 (age 33)	(India) Kerala Blasters FC
23	Vignesh Dakshinamurthy	(India)	LB	5 March 1998 (age 28)	(India) Hyderabad FC
26	Laldinliana Renthlei	(India)	RB	26 August 1998 (age 28)	(India) Jamshedpur FC
42	SK Rajjak Ali	(India)	DF	1 February 2005 (age 21)	(India) Chennaiyin FC II
50	Klusner John Manuel Pereira	(India)	LB	11 February 1998 (age 28)	(India) SC de Goa
57	Raj Basfore	(India)	CB	15 March 2003 (age 23)	(India) Mohun Bagan SG II
	Eduardo Kau	(Brazil)	CB	17 January 1999 (age 27)	(Thailand) Ayutthaya United F.C.
Midfielders
8	Jitendra Singh	(India)	DM/CM/CB	13 June 2001 (age 25)	(India) Jamshedpur FC
21	Maheson Singh Tongbram	(India)	DM	26 November 2004 (age 21)	(India) Punjab FC
22	Lalrinliana Hnamte	(India)	CM/DM/RM	29 April 2003 (age 23)	(India) Mohun Bagan Super Giant
37	Jiteshwor Singh	(India)	DM/CM	10 December 2001 (age 24)	(India) NEROCA FC
44	Solaimalai R	(India)	DM	24 May 2003 (age 23)	(India) Chennaiyin FC II
45	Ngangom Raman Singh	(India)	MF	27 March 2007 (age 19)	(India) Chennaiyin FC II
46	Karthick Thirumalai	(India)	MF	21 August 2005 (age 21)	(India) Chennaiyin FC II
51	Kingsley Fernandes	(India)	CM/DM	26 January 1998 (age 28)	(India) Churchill Brothers FC
	Alberto Noguera	(Spain)	AM/CM	24 September 1989 (age 37)	(Spain) CF Rayo Majadahonda
	Mohammed Ali Bemammer	(Morocco)	DM/CM	19 November 1989 (age 36)	Without Club
Forwards
19	Irfan Yadwad	(India)	CF/LW	19 June 2001 (age 25)	(India) FC Bengaluru United
27	Daniel Chima Chukwu	(Nigeria)	CF	4 January 1991 (age 35)	(India) Jamshedpur FC
48	Vivek S	(India)	FW	27 February 2005 (age 21)	(India) Chennaiyin FC II
71	Farukh Choudhary	(India)	LW/RW	8 November 1996 (age 29)	(India) Jamshedpur FC
77	Gurkirat Singh	(India)	RW/CF/LW	16 July 2003 (age 23)	(India) Mumbai City FC
	Imran Khan	(India)	RW/LW	1 March 1995 (age 31)	Without Club
	Iñigo Martin	(Spain)	CF	24 May 1999 (age 27)	(Georgia (country)) FC Telavi

== Transfers ==
=== Incomings ===
Date	Player	Position(s)	From	Fee
24 October 2025	(India) Kingsley Fernandes	CM/DM	(India) Churchill Brothers FC	Free Transfer
24 October 2025	(India) Raj Basfore	CB	(India) Mohun Bagan SG II	Free Transfer
24 October 2025	(India) Klusner John Manuel Pereira	LB	(India) SC de Goa	Free Transfer
26 January 2026	(India) Imran Khan	RW/LW	Without Club	Free Transfer
28 January 2026	(Spain) Alberto Noguera	AM/CM	(Spain) CF Rayo Majadahonda	Free Transfer
29 January 2026	(Morocco) Mohammed Ali Bemammer	DM/CM	Without Club	Free Transfer
29 January 2026	(Spain) Iñigo Martin	CF	(Georgia (country)) FC Telavi	Free Transfer
30 January 2026	(Brazil) Eduardo Kau	CB	(Thailand) Ayutthaya United F.C.	Free Transfer
▼ Spending: ₹0

=== Outgoings ===
Date	Player	Position(s)	To	Fee
12 June 2024	(Colombia) Wilmar Jordán	CF	(Honduras) FC Motagua	Free Transfer
12 June 2024	(India) Prateek Kumar Singh	GK	(India) Sribhumi FC	Free Transfer
18 June 2024	(India) Edwin Sydney Vanspaul	DM/RB	Without Club	Other
19 June 2024	(England) Ryan Edwards	CB	Without Club	Other
20 June 2024	(Scotland) Connor Shields	AM/CM/DM	Without Club	Other
4 July 2024	(India) Kiyan Nassiri	CF/LW/RW	(India) Mohun Bagan Super Giant	₹30 lakh (US$31,000)
14 July 2024	(India) Vincy Barretto	LW/RW	(India) Jamshedpur FC	Free Transfer
10 August 2024	(Brazil) Lukas Brambilla	AM/LW/RW	(Kuwait) Al-Fahaheel SC	Free Transfer
▲ Income: ₹30 lakh (US$31,000)

== Competitions ==
=== Overall record ===
Competition	First match	Last match	Starting round	Final position	Record							
Competition	First match	Last match	Starting round	Final position	Pld	W	D	L	GF	GA	GD	Win %
Group stage	25 October 2025	31 October 2025	Group stage	Group stage	3	0	1	2	1	7	−6	0.00
Indian Super League	19 February 2026	16 May 2026	League stage	13th	13	2	3	8	7	32	−25	15.38
Total					16	2	4	10	8	39	−31	12.50

=== Super Cup ===
Chennaiyin FC will participate in the Super Cup and was grouped into Group A alongside Mohun Bagan Super Giants, East Bengal FC and Dempo SC.

==== Group stage ====
Pos	Team	Pld	W	D	L	GF	GA	GD	Pts	Qualification	EAB	MBG	DEM	CFC
1	East Bengal	3	1	2	0	6	2	+4	5	Advance to knockout stage		0–0	2–2	4–0
2	Mohun Bagan	3	1	2	0	2	0	+2	5				0–0	2–0
3	Dempo (H)	3	0	3	0	3	3	0	3					1–1
4	Chennaiyin	3	0	1	2	1	7	−6	1					

Source: AIFF
Legend: Blue = home team win; Yellow = draw; Red = away team win.
Rules for classification: 1) points; 2) head-to-head points; 3) head-to-head goal difference; 4) goal difference; 5) number of goals scored; 6) Penalty shoot-out if only two teams are tied and they met in the last round of the group; 7) Disciplinary points; 8) drawing of lots
(H) Hosts

==== Matches ====
Win Draw Loss Void

25 October 2025 Group stage	Mohun Bagan	2–0	Chennaiyin	Fatorda
19:30 IST	Jamie Maclaren 38', 67'; Anirudh Thapa (yellow card) 45+1'; Alberto Rodriguez (yellow card) 47'	AIFF; I-League	Vignesh Dakshinamurthy (yellow card) 33'	Stadium: Fatorda Stadium; Attendance: 323; Referee: TV Nagvenkar; Man of the Match: Jamie Maclaren (Mohun Bagan)

28 October 2025 Group stage	Chennaiyin	0–4	East Bengal	Bambolim
16:30 IST		I-League; PDF Report	Kevin 36'; Bipin 40', 45+1'; Hiroshi 90+4' (pen.)	Stadium: GMC Athletic Stadium; Attendance: 247; Referee: Aditya Purkayastha; Man of the Match: Naorem Mahesh Singh (East Bengal)

31 October 2025 Group stage	Dempo	1–1	Chennaiyin	Bambolim
16:30 IST	Shubham 28'	I-League; PDF Report	Samik 31'	Stadium: GMC Athletic Stadium; Attendance: 674; Referee: Pratik Mondal

=== Indian Super League ===
==== League table ====
Pos	Team	Pld	W	D	L	GF	GA	GD	Pts	Qualification
10	Inter Kashi	13	3	4	6	11	17	−6	13	
11	Odisha	13	2	5	6	14	22	−8	11 (Note: Head-to-head points: Odisha 3, Delhi 0.)	
12	Delhi	13	2	5	6	13	17	−4	11	
13	Chennaiyin	13	2	3	8	9	21	−12	9	
14	Mohammedan (R)	13	0	3	10	7	32	−25	3	Relegation to IFL

Source: Indian Super League
Rules for classification: 1) points; 2) goal difference; 3) number of goals scored; 4) head-to-head points; 5) head-to-head goal difference; 6) head-to-head goals scored; 7) fair play ranking; 8) drawing of lots.
(Note: Head-to-head record is used only after all the matches between the teams in question have been played).
(R) Relegated
