= 2025–26 AIFF Super Cup =

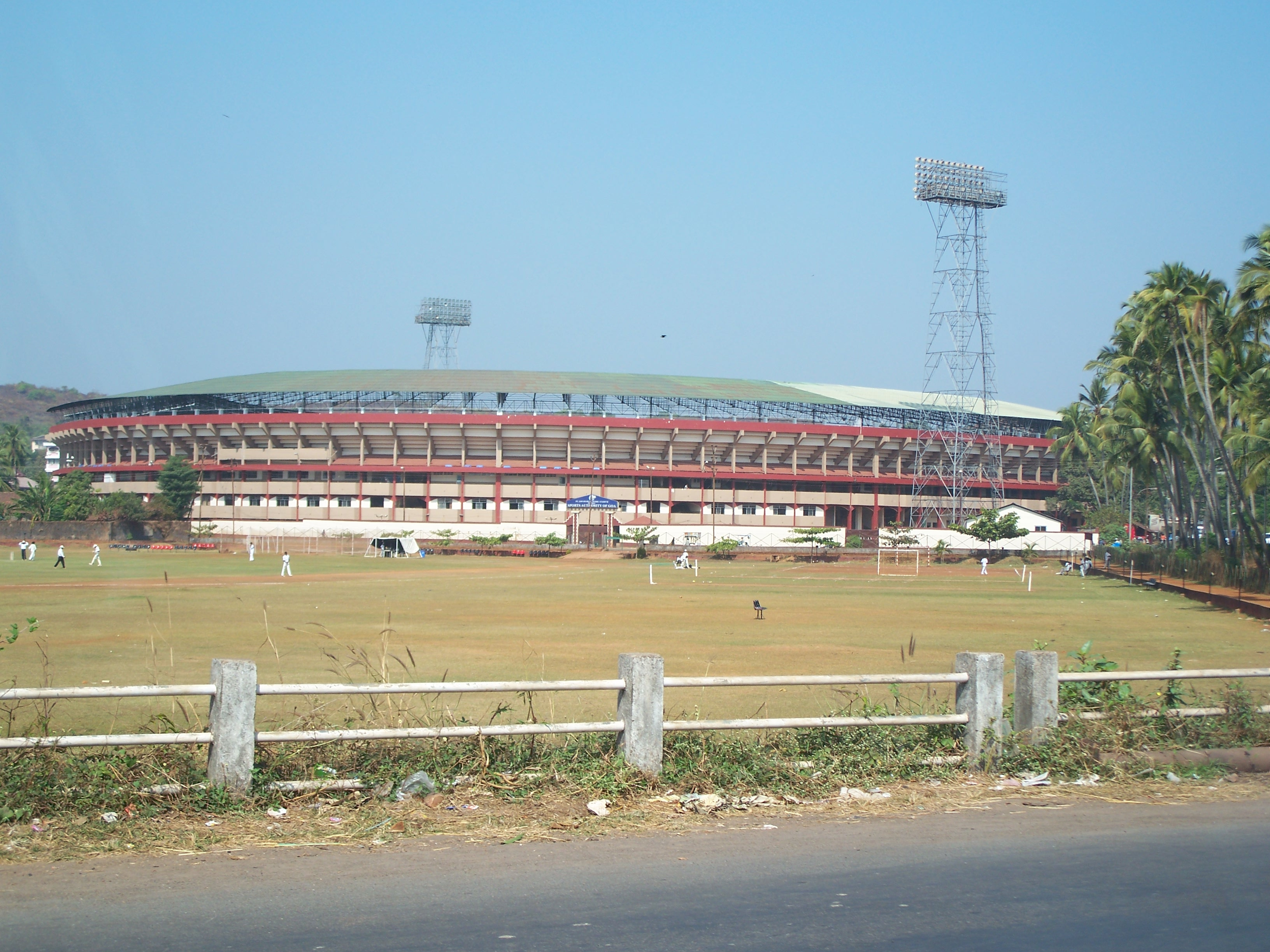
- Fatorda Stadium hosted the final on 7 December 2025

Tournament details
- Country: India
- Venue(s): Fatorda Stadium, Fatorda; GMC Athletic Stadium, Bambolim
- Dates: 25 October – 7 December 2025
- Teams: 16

Final positions
- Champions: Goa (3rd title)
- Runners-up: East Bengal
- AFC Champions League 2: Goa

Tournament statistics
- Matches played: 27
- Goals scored: 67 (2.48 per match)
- Attendance: 24,888 (922 per match)
- Top goal scorer(s): Koldo Obieta (Kerala Blasters FC) (3 goals)

The 2025–26 AIFF Super Cup was the sixth edition of the Super Cup and the 44th season of the national knockout football competition organized by the All India Football Federation (AIFF). It featured all clubs from the top-tier Indian Super League and top clubs from the second tier Indian Football League, serving as the main domestic cup competition for men's football in India. FC Goa are the defending champions, having defeated the Jamshedpur FC 3–0 in the previous edition final to win their second national cup title.

FC Goa defeated East Bengal on penalty-shootouts after the match ended in a 0–0 draw after extra time, FC Goa win their third national cup title. As the winners, Goa have qualified for the 2026–27 AFC Champions League Two preliminary stage.

== Format ==
Competition format consists of a group stage and a knock-out stage. Group stage features 16 teams across the top two divisions of Indian football. 13 from the ISL (except Odisha FC) and best top 3 from usual top standings of the I-League qualify for the group stage. The 16 qualified are drawn into four groups of four each, competing in a single round-robin format, with group winners making it through to the semi-finals.

== Teams ==
Locations of the Super Cup teams
Locations of the stadiums and clubs in Goa
Location of the Kolkata football clubs

Round of 16 entrants:
Team	League	App (last)
Bengaluru	Indian Super League	6th (2025)
Chennaiyin	Indian Super League	6th (2025)
Delhi	Indian Super League	1st
East Bengal	Indian Super League	5th (2025)
Goa	Indian Super League	6th (2025)
Jamshedpur	Indian Super League	6th (2025)
Kerala Blasters	Indian Super League	6th (2025)
Mohun Bagan	Indian Super League	5th (2025)
Mohammedan	Indian Super League	3rd (2025)
Mumbai City	Indian Super League	6th (2025)
NorthEast United	Indian Super League	6th (2025)
Punjab	Indian Super League	4th (2025)
Inter Kashi	Indian Super League	3rd (2025)
~~Real Kashmir~~; Dempo	I-League	1st
Gokulam Kerala	I-League	5th (2025)
Rajasthan United	I-League	3rd (2024)

== Schedule ==
Round	Match dates
Group stage	25 October–6 November 2025
Semi-finals	4 December 2025
Final	7 December 2025

== Venues ==
The matches were held in two different venues in Goa.

Fatorda	Bambolim
Fatorda Stadium	GMC Athletic Stadium
Capacity: 19,000	Capacity: ~3,000

== Group stage ==
16 teams were divided into 2 pots. The ISL teams were designated as Pot 1 whereas Pot 2 consisted of the I-League teams.

Pot 1	Pot 2
NorthEast United	Inter Kashi
Bengaluru	~~Real Kashmir~~
Jamshedpur	Gokulam Kerala
Mumbai City	Rajasthan United
Kerala Blasters	Dempo
Punjab	
East Bengal
Chennaiyin
Delhi
Mohammedan

Mohun Bagan and Goa were designated as two top-seeded teams and were placed in A1 and B1. The draw took place on 22 September 2025.

Real Kashmir, later withdrew due to logistical issues, and were replaced by Dempo.

=== Group A ===
Pos	Team	Pld	W	D	L	GF	GA	GD	Pts	Qualification	EAB	MBG	DEM	CFC
1	East Bengal	3	1	2	0	6	2	+4	5	Advance to knockout stage		0–0	2–2	4–0
2	Mohun Bagan	3	1	2	0	2	0	+2	5				0–0	2–0
3	Dempo (H)	3	0	3	0	3	3	0	3					1–1
4	Chennaiyin	3	0	1	2	1	7	−6	1					

Source: AIFF
Legend: Blue = home team win; Yellow = draw; Red = away team win.
Rules for classification: 1) points; 2) head-to-head points; 3) head-to-head goal difference; 4) goal difference; 5) number of goals scored; 6) Penalty shoot-out if only two teams are tied and they met in the last round of the group; 7) Disciplinary points; 8) drawing of lots
(H) Hosts

=== Group B ===
Pos	Team	Pld	W	D	L	GF	GA	GD	Pts	Qualification	GOA	NEU	JFC	INK
1	Goa (H)	3	2	0	1	6	2	+4	6	Advance to knockout stage		1–2	2–0	3–0
2	NorthEast United	3	1	2	0	6	5	+1	5				2–2	2–2
3	Jamshedpur	3	1	1	1	4	4	0	4					2–0
4	Inter Kashi	3	0	1	2	2	7	−5	1					

Source: AIFF
Legend: Blue = home team win; Yellow = draw; Red = away team win.
Rules for classification: 1)1) points; 2) head-to-head points; 3) head-to-head goal difference; 4) goal difference; 5) number of goals scored; 6) Penalty shoot-out if only two teams are tied and they met in the last round of the group; 7) Disciplinary points; 8) drawing of lots
(H) Hosts

=== Group C ===
Pos	Team	Pld	W	D	L	GF	GA	GD	Pts	Qualification	PFC	BFC	GOK	MDS
1	Punjab	3	2	1	0	6	0	+6	7 (Note: Punjab qualified after winning the penalty shoot-out.)	Advance to knockout stage		0–0	3–0	3–0
2	Bengaluru	3	2	1	0	6	0	+6	7				4–0	2–0
3	Gokulam Kerala	3	1	0	2	3	7	−4	3					3–0
4	Mohammedan	3	0	0	3	0	8	−8	0					

Source: AIFF
Legend: Blue = home team win; Yellow = draw; Red = away team win.
Rules for classification: 1) points; 2) head-to-head points; 3) head-to-head goal difference; 4) goal difference; 5) number of goals scored; 6) Penalty shoot-out if only two teams are tied and they met in the last round of the group; 7) Disciplinary points; 8) drawing of lots

=== Group D ===
Pos	Team	Pld	W	D	L	GF	GA	GD	Pts	Qualification	MUM	KER	RAJ	DEL
1	Mumbai City	3	2	0	1	5	2	+3	6 (Note: Head-to-head points: Mumbai City 3, Kerala 0.)	Advance to knockout stage		1–0	0–1	4–1
2	Kerala Blasters	3	2	0	1	4	1	+3	6				1–0	3–0
3	Rajasthan United	3	1	1	1	3	3	0	4					2–2
4	Delhi	3	0	1	2	3	9	−6	1					

Source: AIFF
Legend: Blue = home team win; Yellow = draw; Red = away team win.
Rules for classification: 1) points; 2) head-to-head points; 3) head-to-head goal difference; 4) goal difference; 5) number of goals scored; 6) Penalty shoot-out if only two teams are tied and they met in the last round of the group; 7) Disciplinary points; 8) drawing of lots

== Knockout stage ==
=== Bracket ===
Semifinals
A1	East Bengal	3
C1	Punjab	1
B1	Goa	2
D1	Mumbai City	1

Final
SF1	East Bengal	0 (5)
SF2	Goa (p)	0 (6)

=== Semi-finals ===
4 December 2025
16:00 IST
SF1

East Bengal	3–1	Punjab
Rashid 12'; Sibille 45+3'; Crespo 70'	I-League; PDF Report	Ramírez 34' (pen.)

Fatorda Stadium, Fatorda
Attendance: 300
Referee: Ashwin

4 December 2025
20:00 IST
SF2

Goa	2–1	Mumbai City
Brison 20'; Timor 23'	I-League; PDF Report	Brandon 59'

Fatorda Stadium, Fatorda
Attendance: 5,000
Referee: Pratik Mondal
Man of the Match: David Timor (Goa)

=== Final ===
7 December 2025
19:30 IST
Final

East Bengal	0–0 (a.e.t.)	Goa
	I-League; PDF Report
Penalties
Sibille (penalty scored); Saúl (penalty scored); Miguel (penalty scored); Rashid (penalty missed); A. Ali (penalty scored); Ahadad (penalty scored); PV Vishnu (penalty missed)	5–6	(penalty missed) Borja; (penalty scored) Siverio; (penalty scored) Dejan; (penalty scored) Nemil; (penalty scored) Timor; (penalty scored) Udanta; (penalty scored) Tavora

Fatorda Stadium, Fatorda
Attendance: 9,400
Referee: Harish Kundu
Man of the Match: Hrithik Tiwari (Goa)

== Top scorers ==
As of 7 December 2025

Rank	Player	Team	Goals
1	(Spain) Koldo Obieta	Kerala Blasters	3
2	(India) Ryan Williams	Bengaluru	2
2	(India) Sunil Chhetri	Bengaluru	2
2	(India) Bipin Singh	East Bengal	2
2	(Argentina) Kevin Sibille	East Bengal	2
2	(Cameroon) Messi Bouli	Jamshedpur	2
2	(Spain) Borja Herrera	Goa	2
2	(Serbia) Dejan Dražić	Goa	2
2	(Australia) Jamie Maclaren	Mohun Bagan	2
2	(India) Vikram Partap	Mumbai City	2
2	(Morocco) Alaaeddine Ajaraie	North East	2
2	(Spain) Chema	North East	2
2	(Colombia) Robinson Blandón	Rajasthan United	2
14	(India) Kelvin Singh	Bengaluru	1
14	(India) Vinith Venkatesh	Bengaluru	1
14	(India) Samik Mitra	Chennaiyin	1
14	(Brazil) Andrei Alba	Delhi	1
14	(India) Sourav K.	Delhi	1
14	(India) Alan Saji	Delhi	1
14	(India) Laximanrao Rane	Dempo	1
14	(India) Mohamed Ali	Dempo	1
14	(India) Shubham Rawat	Dempo	1
14	(Japan) Hiroshi Ibusuki	East Bengal	1
14	(Brazil) Miguel Figueira	East Bengal	1
14	(India) Naorem Mahesh	East Bengal	1
14	(Palestine) Mohammed Rashid	East Bengal	1
14	(Spain) Saúl Crespo	East Bengal	1
14	(Spain) Javier Siverio	Goa	1
14	(India) Sahil Tavora	Goa	1
14	(India) Brison Fernandes	Goa	1
14	(Spain) David Timor	Goa	1
14	(Spain) Albert Torras	Gokulam Kerala	1
14	(India) Samuel Kynshi	Gokulam Kerala	1
14	(Spain) Juan Carlos Rico Azorín	Gokulam Kerala	1
14	(India) Harmanpreet Sjngh	Inter Kashi	1
14	(India) Karthik Panicker	Inter Kashi	1
14	(India) Manvir Singh	Jamshedpur	1
14	(India) Pronay Halder	Jamshedpur	1
14	(India) Korou Singh	Kerala Blasters	1
14	(Spain) Jorge Ortiz	Mumbai City	1
14	(Argentina) Jorge Pereyra Díaz	Mumbai City	1
14	(India) Brandon Fernandes	Mumbai City	1
14	(India) Robin Yadav	North East	1
14	(Spain) Míchel Zabaco	North East	1
14	(India) Manglenthang Kipgen	Punjab	1
14	(India) Md Suhail	Punjab	1
14	(India) Nikhil Prabhu	Punjab	1
14	(India) Ninthoinganba Meetei	Punjab	1
14	(India) Princeton Rebello	Punjab	1
14	(Bosnia and Herzegovina) Samir Zeljković	Punjab	1
14	(Spain) Dani Ramírez	Punjab	1
14	(Spain) Pedro Astray	Rajasthan United	1
Own Goal			1
Total			67

== Awards ==
Award	Winner	Team	Prize
Best goalkeeper			₹ 2,50,000
Best defender			₹ 2,50,000
Best midfielder			₹ 2,50,000
Highest goalscorer	(Spain) Koldo Obieta	Kerala Blasters	₹ 2,50,000
Player of the tournament			₹ 2,50,000
Runners-up	East Bengal		₹ 15,00,000
Champions	FC Goa		₹ 25,00,000
Source: AIFF

== Broadcasting ==
The entire 2025–26 Super Cup edition will stream live on JioHotstar and Star Sports Khel for games played in Fatorda Stadium and official YouTube channel of AIFF for games played in GMC Athletic Stadium, Bambolim

== See also ==
- Men
  - 2025–26 Indian Super League (Tier I)
  - 2025–26 I-League (Tier II)
  - 2025–26 I-League 2 (Tier III)
  - 2025–26 I-League 3 (Tier IV)
  - 2025–26 Indian State Leagues (Tier V)
  - 2025 Durand Cup
  - 2025 RFD League
- 2025–26 in Indian football
- Women
  - 2025–26 Indian Women's League
  - 2025–26 Indian Women's League 2
