= 2025–26 AIFF Super Cup group stage =

Group stage of 2025–26 AIFF Super Cup

Tournament details
- Country: India
- Teams: 16

Tournament statistics
- Matches played: 24
- Goals scored: 60 (2.5 per match)
- Attendance: 10,188 (425 per match)
- Top goal scorer(s): Koldo Obieta (Kerala Blasters) (3 goals)

The 2025–26 AIFF Super Cup edition is being held in Goa from October 25 to November 22, 2025. Due to scheduling changes, it is being held at the start of the season. A total of 16 teams, consisting of 13 Indian Super League (ISL) and 3 I-League, are competing in the group stage to decide the 4 places in the knockout stage.

== Draw ==
The draw for the group stage was conducted on 25 September 2025.

All current ISL teams except Odisha participated. This included Inter Kashi, who were newly promoted to the ISL. Three other I-League teams (based on their standings in the 2024–25 I-League also participated: Gokulam Kerala, Rajasthan United and Dempo (who replaced Real Kashmir).

Mohun Bagan and FC Goa, the top two ISL teams were placed in position 1 in Groups A and B respectively. The rest of the teams were divided into two pots, with the remaining ten ISL teams placed in Pots 1, according to their points in the 2024–25 ISL. The four I-League teams were placed in Pot 2.

Predetermined	Pot 1	Pot 2
Mohun Bagan (A1); Goa (H) (B1)	Bengaluru; NorthEast United; Jamshedpur; Mumbai City; Kerala Blasters; East Bengal; Punjab; Chennaiyin; Delhi; Mohammedan	Inter Kashi; Dempo; Gokulam Kerala; Rajasthan United

== Format ==
Each group is being played in a single round-robin format. The top team advances to the knockout stage.

=== Tiebreakers ===
The teams are ranked according to points. When tied on points, tiebreakers are applied in the following order:

1. Points in head-to-head matches among participating teams;
2. Goal difference in head-to-head matches among participating teams;
3. Goals scored in head-to-head matches among participating teams;
4. If more than two teams are tied, and after applying all head-to-head criteria above, a subset of teams are still tied, all head-to-head criteria above are reapplied exclusively to the matches between the participating teams,
5. Goal difference from all group matches;
6. Goals scored from all group matches;
7. Penalty shoot-out if only two teams are tied and they met in the last round of the group;
8. Disciplinary points (yellow card = 1 point, red card as a result of two yellow cards = 3 points, direct red card = 3 points, yellow card followed by direct red card = 4 points);
9. Drawing of lots.

== Groups ==
=== Group A ===
Pos	Team	Pld	W	D	L	GF	GA	GD	Pts	Qualification	EAB	MBG	DEM	CFC
1	East Bengal	3	1	2	0	6	2	+4	5	Advance to knockout stage		0–0	2–2	4–0
2	Mohun Bagan	3	1	2	0	2	0	+2	5				0–0	2–0
3	Dempo (H)	3	0	3	0	3	3	0	3					1–1
4	Chennaiyin	3	0	1	2	1	7	−6	1					

Source: AIFF
Rules for classification: 1) points; 2) head-to-head points; 3) head-to-head goal difference; 4) goal difference; 5) number of goals scored; 6) Penalty shoot-out if only two teams are tied and they met in the last round of the group; 7) Disciplinary points; 8) drawing of lots
(H) Hosts
25 October 2025
16:30 IST
Match 1

East Bengal	2–2	Dempo
Naorem 46'; Figueira 57'	I-League; PDF Report	M. Ali 27'; Rane 89'

GMC Athletic Stadium, Bambolim
Attendance: 934
Referee: Ashwin
Man of the Match: Laximanrao Rane (Dempo)
25 October 2025
19:30 IST
Match 2

Mohun Bagan	2–0	Chennaiyin
Maclaren 38', 67'	I-League; PDF Report

Fatorda Stadium, Fatorda
Attendance: 323
Referee: TV Nagvenkar
Man of the Match: Jamie Maclaren (Mohun Bagan)
28 October 2025
16:30 IST
Match 7

Chennaiyin	0–4	East Bengal
	I-League; PDF Report	Sibille 36'; Thounaojam 40', 45+1'; Ibusuki 90+4' (pen.)

GMC Athletic Stadium, Bambolim
Attendance: 247
Referee: Aditya Purkayastha
Man of the Match: Naorem Mahesh Singh (East Bengal)
28 October 2025
19:30 IST
Match 8

Mohun Bagan	0–0	Dempo
	I-League; PDF Report

Fatorda Stadium, Fatorda
Attendance: 576
Referee: Crystal John
Man of the Match: Ashish Sibi (Dempo)
31 October 2025
16:30 IST
Match 13

Dempo	1–1	Chennaiyin
Rawat 28'	I-League; PDF Report	Mitra 31'

GMC Athletic Stadium, Bambolim
Attendance: 674
Referee: Pratik Mondal
31 October 2025
19:30 IST
Match 14

Mohun Bagan	0–0	East Bengal
	I-League; PDF Report

Fatorda Stadium, Fatorda
Attendance: 1245
Referee: Harish Kundu
Man of the Match: Alberto Rodríguez (Mohun Bagan)

=== Group B ===
Pos	Team	Pld	W	D	L	GF	GA	GD	Pts	Qualification	GOA	NEU	JFC	INK
1	Goa (H)	3	2	0	1	6	2	+4	6	Advance to knockout stage		1–2	2–0	3–0
2	NorthEast United	3	1	2	0	6	5	+1	5				2–2	2–2
3	Jamshedpur	3	1	1	1	4	4	0	4					2–0
4	Inter Kashi	3	0	1	2	2	7	−5	1					

Source: AIFF
Rules for classification: 1)1) points; 2) head-to-head points; 3) head-to-head goal difference; 4) goal difference; 5) number of goals scored; 6) Penalty shoot-out if only two teams are tied and they met in the last round of the group; 7) Disciplinary points; 8) drawing of lots
(H) Hosts
26 October 2025
16:30 IST
Match 3

NorthEast United	2–2	Inter Kashi
Ajaraie 18'; Zabaco 40'	I-League; PDF Report	H. Singh 5'; Panicker 74'

GMC Athletic Stadium, Bambolim
Attendance: 226
Referee: Harish Kundu
Man of the Match: Karthik Panicker (Inter Kashi)
26 October 2025
19:30 IST
Match 4

Goa	2–0	Jamshedpur
Siverio 45'; Dražić 66'	I-League; PDF Report

Fatorda Stadium, Fatorda
Attendance: 327
Referee: Venkatesh Ramachandran
Man of the Match: Dejan Drazic (Goa)
29 October 2025
16:30 IST
Match 9

Jamshedpur	2–2	NorthEast United
Halder 43'; Messi Bouli 89'	I-League; PDF Report	Chema 20'; Ajaraie 29'

GMC Athletic Stadium, Bambolim
Attendance: 467
Referee: Tejas Nagvenkar
29 October 2025
19:30 IST
Match 10

Goa	3–0	Inter Kashi
Dražić 4'; Herrera 38', 42'	I-League; PDF Report

Fatorda Stadium, Fatorda
Attendance: 893
Referee: Ashwin
Man of the Match: Borja Herrera (Goa)
1 November 2025
16:30 IST
Match 15

Inter Kashi	0–2	Jamshedpur
	I-League; PDF Report	Messi Bouli 38'; Manvir 82'

GMC Athletic Stadium, Bambolim
Attendance: 136
Referee: K Ramdasan
1 November 2025
19:30 IST
Match 16

Goa	1–2	NorthEast United
Tavora 72'	I-League; PDF Report	Chema 68'; Yadav 77'

Fatorda Stadium, Fatorda
Attendance: 1,723
Referee: Crystal John
Man of the Match: Dipesh Chauhan (NorthEast United)

=== Group C ===
Pos	Team	Pld	W	D	L	GF	GA	GD	Pts	Qualification	PFC	BFC	GOK	MDS
1	Punjab	3	2	1	0	6	0	+6	7 (Note: Punjab qualified after winning the penalty shoot-out.)	Advance to knockout stage		0–0	3–0	3–0
2	Bengaluru	3	2	1	0	6	0	+6	7				4–0	2–0
3	Gokulam Kerala	3	1	0	2	3	7	−4	3					3–0
4	Mohammedan	3	0	0	3	0	8	−8	0					

Source: AIFF
Rules for classification: 1) points; 2) head-to-head points; 3) head-to-head goal difference; 4) goal difference; 5) number of goals scored; 6) Penalty shoot-out if only two teams are tied and they met in the last round of the group; 7) Disciplinary points; 8) drawing of lots
Notes:
27 October 2025
19:30 IST
Match 5

Punjab	3–0	Gokulam Kerala
Suhail 2'; Prabhu 10'; Rebello 43'	I-League; PDF Report

GMC Athletic Stadium, Bambolim
Attendance: 189
Referee: K Ramdasan
30 October 2025
19:30 IST
Match 12

Bengaluru	2–0	Mohammedan
Taorem 34'; Chhetri 86' (pen.)	I-League; PDF Report

Fatorda Stadium, Fatorda
Attendance: 232
Referee: Venkatesh Ramachandran
Man of the Match: Taorem Kelvin Singh (Bengaluru)
2 November 2025
16:30 IST
Match 17

Mohammedan	0–3	Punjab
	I-League; PDF Report	Ninthoi 27'; Zeljković 43'; Kipgen 73'

GMC Athletic Stadium, Bambolim
Attendance: 123
Referee: Tejas Nagvenkar
2 November 2025
19:30 IST
Match 18

Gokulam Kerala	0–4	Bengaluru
	I-League; PDF Report	Williams 7', 47'; Vinith 44'; Chhetri 62'

Fatorda Stadium, Fatorda
Attendance: 350
Referee: Aditya Purkayastha
Man of the Match: Ryan Williams (Bengaluru)
5 November 2025
16:30 IST
Match 21

Gokulam Kerala	3–0	Mohammedan
Torras 28'; Kynshi 56'; Azorin 86'	I-League; PDF Report

GMC Athletic Stadium, Bambolim
Attendance: 100
Referee: Crystal John
5 November 2025
19:30 IST
Match 22

Bengaluru	0–0	Punjab
	I-League; PDF Report
Penalties
Wangjam (penalty scored); Bheke (penalty scored); Williams (penalty missed); Chhetri (penalty scored); Sánchez (penalty scored)	4–5	(penalty scored) Nsungusi; (penalty scored) Rebello; (penalty scored) Zeljković; (penalty scored) L.Augustine; (penalty scored) V. Rai

Fatorda Stadium, Fatorda
Attendance: 100
Referee: Ashwin
Man of the Match: Muheet Shabir (Punjab)

=== Group D ===
Pos	Team	Pld	W	D	L	GF	GA	GD	Pts	Qualification	MUM	KER	RAJ	DEL
1	Mumbai City	3	2	0	1	5	2	+3	6 (Note: Head-to-head points: Mumbai City 3, Kerala 0.)	Advance to knockout stage		1–0	0–1	4–1
2	Kerala Blasters	3	2	0	1	4	1	+3	6				1–0	3–0
3	Rajasthan United	3	1	1	1	3	3	0	4					2–2
4	Delhi	3	0	1	2	3	9	−6	1					

Source: AIFF
Rules for classification: 1) points; 2) head-to-head points; 3) head-to-head goal difference; 4) goal difference; 5) number of goals scored; 6) Penalty shoot-out if only two teams are tied and they met in the last round of the group; 7) Disciplinary points; 8) drawing of lots
Notes:
27 October 2025
19:30 IST
Match 6

Delhi	1–4	Mumbai City
Alba 75' (pen.)	I-League; PDF Report	P. Díaz 7'; V. P. Singh 9', 90+4'; Ortiz 32'

Fatorda Stadium, Fatorda
Attendance: 272
Referee: Pratik Mondal
Man of the Match: Vikram Partap (Mumbai City)
30 October 2025
16:30 IST
Match 11

Rajasthan United	0–1	Kerala Blasters
	I-League; PDF Report	Obieta 87'

GMC Athletic Stadium, Bambolim
Attendance: 213
Referee: Aditya Purkayastha
3 November 2025
16:30 IST
Match 19

Kerala Blasters	3–0	Delhi
Obieta 18', 23'; Thingujam 34'	I-League; PDF Report

GMC Athletic Stadium, Bambolim
Attendance: 100
Referee: Ashwin
3 November 2025
19:30 IST
Match 20

Rajasthan United	1–0	Mumbai City
Blandón 43'	I-League; PDF Report

Fatorda Stadium, Fatorda
Attendance: 150
Referee: Pratik Mondal
Man of the Match: Robinson Blandón (Rajasthan)
6 November 2025
16:30 IST
Match 23

Rajasthan United	2–2	Delhi
Pedro 22'; Blandón 35'	I-League; PDF Report	Sourav 61'; Saji 90+4'

GMC Athletic Stadium, Bambolim
Attendance: 100
Referee: K Ramdasan
6 November 2025
19:30 IST
Match 24

Mumbai City	1–0	Kerala Blasters
Saheef 88' (o.g.)	I-League; PDF Report

Fatorda Stadium, Fatorda
Attendance: 488
Referee: Harish Kundu
Man of the Match: Akash Mishra (Mumbai City)
