= 2025 Super Cup =

2025 Super Cup refers to multiple football tournaments in India held in the same year due to scheduling issues:

- 2025 Super Cup (India, April)
- 2025 Super Cup (India, October)
