= G.D. Santa Cruz de Alvarenga =

Portuguese football club

GDSC Alvarenga
- Full name: Grupo Desportivo Santa Cruz de Alvarenga
- Founded: 1977; 48 years ago
- Ground: Alvarenga, Arouca
- Chairman: Nuno Saraiva
- Website: www.alvarenga.club

Grupo Desportivo Santa Cruz de Alvarenga is a Portuguese association football club based in Arouca. It was founded in 1977, and currently competes in the Campeonato de Portugal, the fourth tier of Portuguese football.

== Notable players ==
- (Paraguay) Isidro Pitta (2017–2018)
- (India) Sahil Tavora (2018–2019)
