= Koldo Obieta =

Spanish footballer

Personal information
- Full name: Koldo Obieta Alberdi
- Date of birth: 8 October 1993 (age 33)
- Place of birth: Guernica, Spain
- Height: 1.87 m (6 ft 2 in)
- Position: Forward

Team information
- Current team: Kitchee
- Number: 21

Youth career
- Gernika

Senior career*
Years	Team	Apps	(Gls)
2012–2015	Gernika	75	(7)
2015–2016	Zamudio	28	(17)
2016–2017	Amorebieta	31	(11)
2017–2019	Vitoria	62	(9)
2019–2020	Tudelano	28	(4)
2020–2022	Amorebieta	64	(11)
2022–2023	Miedź Legnica	30	(3)
2022	Miedź Legnica II	1	(3)
2023–2024	Alcorcón	29	(1)
2024–2025	Real Unión	34	(4)
2025–2026	Kerala Blasters	0	(03)
2026	Borneo Samarinda	16	(9)
2026–	Kitchee	6	(3)
- * Club domestic league appearances and goals as of 21 November 2026

Koldo Obieta Alberdi (born 8 October 1993) is a Spanish professional footballer who currently plays as a forward for Hong Kong Premier League club Kitchee.

== Club career ==
Born in Guernica, Biscay, Basque Country, Obieta finished his formation with hometown side Gernika Club. After making his first team debut in the 2011–12 season, he left the club in 2015, after achieving promotion from Tercera División.

On 3 July 2015, Obieta signed for Zamudio SD also in the fourth division, and scored 17 goals during the campaign as his side also achieved promotion. On 8 July 2016, he agreed to a deal with Segunda División B side SD Amorebieta.

On 17 July 2017, Obieta moved to SD Eibar and was assigned to the farm team also in the third level. On 5 July 2019, after suffering relegation, he joined CD Tudelano in the same category.

On 10 July 2020, Obieta returned to Amorebieta, and scored four goals during the campaign as his club achieved a first-ever promotion to Segunda División. He made his professional debut at the age of 27 on 23 August 2021, coming on as a late substitute for Iñigo Orozco in a 0–2 away loss against CD Mirandés.

On 20 June 2022, after trying to secure a move to Poland in order to stay closer to his girlfriend, Obieta joined newly-promoted Ekstraklasa side Miedź Legnica on a two-year deal. He left the team by mutual consent on 31 July of the following year, and signed for AD Alcorcón in the second division just hours later.

On 10 July 2024, Obieta signed for Real Unión.

On 3 October 2025, Obieta joined Indian Super League club Kerala Blasters FC for the 2025–26 season. He scored on his debut, in the Super Cup against Rajasthan United. He scored a brace in his second game, against SC Delhi.

On 21 July 2026, Obieta joined Hong Kong Premier League club Kitchee.

== Honours ==
Individual

- AIFF Super Cup Golden Boot: 2025–26
