= Brison Fernandes =

Indian footballer

Personal information
- Full name: Brison Deuben Fernandes
- Date of birth: 17 April 2001 (age 25)
- Place of birth: Loutolim, Goa, India
- Position: Winger

Team information
- Current team: Chennaiyin
- Number: 42

Youth career
- 2013–2015: Salgaocar
- 2016–2021: Goa

Senior career*
Years	Team	Apps	(Gls)
2021–2026	Goa	59	(11)
2026–	Chennaiyin	5	(2)

International career^{‡}
2023	India U23	1	(0)
2025–	India	5	(0)
Medal record
Men's football
Representing India
SAFF Championship
Winner	2026 Bangladesh
- * Club domestic league appearances and goals as of 26 October 2026 ‡ National team caps and goals as of 12:22, 17 November 2026 (UTC)

Brison Deuben Fernandes (born 17 April 2001) is an Indian professional footballer who plays as a forward for Indian Super League club Chennaiyin and the India national team.

== Club career ==
=== FC Goa ===
Fernandes started his career at Salgaocar, where he played at under-14 level. He joined FC Goa in 2016. He played for the FC Goa Reserves in the Goa Pro League and Reliance Foundation Development League.

In September 2021, Fernandes was promoted to the senior team and named in the Goa 2021 Durand Cup squad. On 26 February 2022, he made his Indian Super League debut as a substitute for Makan Chothe in a 2–0 away loss against Mumbai City. On 3 November 2022, he scored his first ISL goal in a 3–0 home win against Jamshedpur FC.

==== 2024–25: Breakthrough season ====
On 4 January 2025, Fernandes scored twice in a 4–2 away win against Odisha FC and became the first domestic player to score consecutive braces in the ISL.

=== Chennaiyin FC ===
On 10 July, 2026, Chennaiyin signed Fernandes on a two-year contract ahead of the 2026-27 season.

== International career ==
On 9 September 2023, Fernandes made his India national under-23 team debut against China in the 2024 AFC U-23 Asian Cup qualification.

== Career statistics ==
=== Club ===
As of match played 7 November 2026

Appearances and goals by club, season and competition
Club	Season	League			Super Cup		Durand Cup		Continental		Total	
Club	Season	Division	Apps	Goals	Apps	Goals	Apps	Goals	Apps	Goals	Apps	Goal
Goa	2020–21	Indian Super League	0	0	0	0	1	0	–		1	0
Goa	2021–22	Indian Super League	2	0	0	0	0	0	—		2	0
Goa	2022–23	Indian Super League	13	3	3	0	0	0	—		16	3
Goa	2023–24	Indian Super League	8	0	3	1	2	0	—		12	1
Goa	2024–25	Indian Super League	24	7	4	1	0	0	—		28	8
Goa	2025–26	Indian Super League	12	1	4	1	0	0	7 (Note: Appearances in AFC Champions League Two)	1	23	3
Goa	Total		59	11	14	3	3	0	7	1	83	15
Chennaiyin	2026–27	Indian Super League	5	2	0	0	0	0	–		5	2
Career total			64	13	14	3	3	0	7	1	88	17

=== International ===
As of 17 November 2026

National team	Year	Apps	Goals
India	2025	2	0
India	2026	3	0
Total		5	0

== Honours ==
FC Goa

- Durand Cup: 2021
- Bandodkar Trophy: 2024
- Super Cup: 2025, 2025–26
