= 2025 AIFF Super Cup =

Football tournament

2025 Super Cup
Kalinga Super Cup
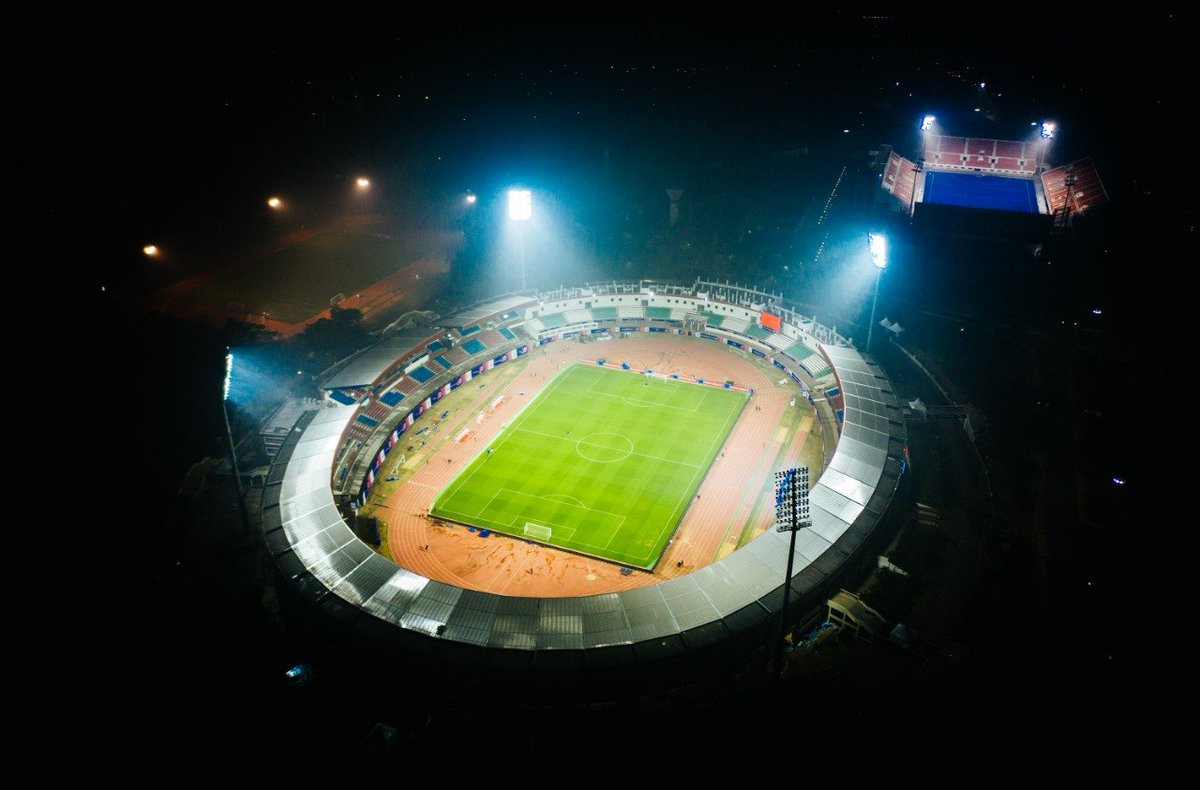
- Kalinga Stadium hosted the final on 3 May

Tournament details
- Country: India
- Venue(s): Kalinga Stadium, Bhubaneswar
- Dates: 20 April – 3 May 2025
- Teams: 15 (Note: One I-league team (Churchill Brothers) withdrew after draw.)

Final positions
- Champions: Goa (2nd title)
- Runners-up: Jamshedpur
- AFC Champions League Two: Goa

Tournament statistics
- Matches played: 14
- Goals scored: 37 (2.64 per match)
- Attendance: 33,556 (2,397 per match)
- Top goal scorer(s): (Spain) Iker Guarrotxena (Goa) (Spain) Borja Herrera (Goa) (4 goals)

Awards
- Best player: (Spain) Borja Herrera (Goa)
- Best goalkeeper: (India) Albino Gomes (Jamshedpur)

The 2025 AIFF Super Cup, officially known as the 2025 Kalinga Super Cup for sponsorship reasons, was the fifth edition of the Super Cup (India) and the 43rd season of the national knockout football competition organized by the All India Football Federation (AIFF). It featured all clubs from the top-tier Indian Super League and top clubs from the second tier I-League, serving as the main domestic cup competition for men's football in India.

FC Goa defeated the Jamshedpur FC 3–0 in the final to win their second national cup title. As the winners, Goa have qualified for the 2025–26 AFC Champions League Two preliminary stage.

== Format ==
The tournament will be played in a knockout format. The 13 ISL teams were seeded for the round of 16 according to their final league position in the 2024–25 season. Three I-League teams confirmed their participation – Churchill Brothers, Inter Kashi and Gokulam Kerala. They would face the top three ISL teams (Mohun Bagan, Goa and Bengaluru). These three match-ups were decided by a draw on Wednesday, April 9. Later Churchill Brothers announced they would withdraw from the Super Cup, citing "I-League title deciding controversy" as the reason. Mohun Bagan (No. 1 seed) were awarded a bye in the round of 16 and granted a direct entry into the quarter-finals.

In the round of 16, quarter-finals and semi-finals, no extra time will be played and any draws will be immediately resolved via penalties. In the final, if the score remains level after 90 minutes, two extra time periods of 15 minutes each will be played. If still level, the match will be decided by a penalty shootout.

== Teams ==
Locations of the Super Cup teams

Round of 16 entrants:
Team	League	App (last)
Bengaluru	Indian Super League	5th (2024)
Chennaiyin	Indian Super League	5th (2024)
East Bengal	Indian Super League	4th (2024)
Goa	Indian Super League	5th (2024)
Hyderabad	Indian Super League	3rd (2024)
Jamshedpur	Indian Super League	5th (2024)
Kerala Blasters	Indian Super League	5th (2024)
Mohun Bagan	Indian Super League	4th (2024)
Mohammedan	Indian Super League	2nd (2023)
Mumbai	Indian Super League	5th (2024)
NorthEast United	Indian Super League	5th (2024)
Odisha	Indian Super League	3rd (2024)
Punjab	Indian Super League	3rd (2024)
~~Churchill Brothers~~ (withdrew)	I-League	~~3rd (2023)~~
Inter Kashi	I-League	2nd (2024)
Gokulam Kerala	I-League	4th (2024)

== Schedule ==
Round	Match dates
Round of 16	20–24 April
Quarter-finals	26–27 April
Semi-finals	30 April
Final	3 May

== Venue ==
The matches will be held at Kalinga Stadium in Bhubaneswar, Odisha.

Bhubaneswar
Kalinga Stadium
Capacity: 15,000

== Match officials ==
The following officials were chosen for the competition.

Referees

- Aditya Purkayastha (†)
- Pratik Mondal (†)
- Harish Kundu (†)
- Venkatesh Ramachadran (†)
- Tejas Nagvenkar (†)
- Ashwin Kumar

Assistant Referees & Fourth Official

- Kennedy Sapam
- B. Nagoorkani
- Ujjal Halder
- Parasuraman Vairamuthu
- Sourav Sarkar
- Pandurangan Muralitharan
- Christopher Cladious Peter
- Sumanta Dutta

(†) : He performs both duties.

== Bracket ==
Round of 16
20 April
8	Kerala Blasters	2
9	East Bengal	0
21 April
2	Goa	3
IL4	Gokulam Kerala	0
21 April
7	Odisha	0
10	Punjab	3
23 April
3	Bengaluru	1 (3)
IL2	Inter Kashi (p)	1 (5)
23 April
6	Mumbai City	4
11	Chennaiyin	0
24 April
4	Northeast United	6
13	Mohammedan	0
24 April
5	Jamshedpur	2
12	Hyderabad	0

Quarter-finals
26 April
8	Kerala Blasters	1
1	Mohun Bagan	2
26 April
2	Goa	2
10	Punjab	1
27 April
IL2	Inter Kashi	0
6	Mumbai City	1
27 April
4	Northeast United	0 (4)
5	Jamshedpur (p)	0 (5)

Semi-finals
30 April
1	Mohun Bagan	1
2	Goa	3
30 April
6	Mumbai City	0
5	Jamshedpur	1

Final
3 May
2	Goa	3
5	Jamshedpur	0

== Round of 16 ==
Number of teams per tier in competition
ISL	I-League	Total
13 / 13	2 / 12	15 / 25

20 April 2025
20:00 IST (UTC+5:30)
Match 1

Kerala Blasters	2–0	East Bengal
Jiménez 40' (pen.); Sadaoui 64'	Report; PDF; Khel Now

Kalinga Stadium, Bhubaneswar
Attendance: 4,367
Referee: Aditya Purkayastha
Man of the Match: Noah Sadaoui (Kerala Blasters)

21 April 2025
16:30 IST (UTC+5:30)
Match 2

Goa	3–0	Gokulam Kerala
Guarrotxena 23' (pen.), 35', 71'	Report; PDF; Khel Now

Kalinga Stadium, Bhubaneswar
Attendance: 568
Referee: Pratik Mondal
Man of the Match: Iker Guarrotxena (Goa)

21 April 2025
20:00 IST (UTC+5:30)
Match 3

Odisha	0–3	Punjab
	Report; PDF; Khel Now	Suljić 14'; Vidal 69'; Nihal 90'

Kalinga Stadium, Bhubaneswar
Attendance: 4,932
Referee: Ashwin Kumar
Man of the Match: Ezequiel Vidal (Punjab)

23 April 2025
16:30 IST (UTC+5:30)
Match 4

Bengaluru	1–1	Inter Kashi
Williams 62'	Report; PDF; Khel Now	Babović 87'
Penalties
Díaz (penalty scored); Williams (penalty scored); Noguera (penalty missed); Chhetri (penalty scored)	3–5	(penalty scored) Babović; (penalty scored) Varghese; (penalty scored) Muñoz; (penalty scored) Das; (penalty scored) Stojanović

Kalinga Stadium, Bhubaneswar
Attendance: 3,216
Referee: Venkatesh Ramachadran
Man of the Match: Nikola Stojanović (Inter Kashi)

23 April 2025
20:00 IST (UTC+5:30)
Match 5

Mumbai City	4–0	Chennaiyin
Karelis 43'; Chhangte 64', 86'; B. Singh 90'	Report; PDF; Khel Now

Kalinga Stadium, Bhubaneswar
Attendance: 1,149
Referee: Harish Kundu
Man of the Match: Lallianzuala Chhangte (Mumbai City)

24 April 2025
16:30 IST (UTC+5:30)
Match 6

Northeast United	6–0	Mohammedan
Jitin 3'; Ajaraie 19', 57', 90+2' (pen.); Albiach 43'; Guillermo 66'	Report; PDF; Khel Now

Kalinga Stadium, Bhubaneswar
Attendance: 1,781
Referee: Tejas Nagvenkar
Man of the Match: Alaaeddine Ajaraie (Northeast United)

24 April 2025
20:00 IST (UTC+5:30)
Match 7

Jamshedpur	2–0	Hyderabad
Siverio 39' (pen.); Eze 64'	Report; PDF; Khel Now

Kalinga Stadium, Bhubaneswar
Attendance: 1,419
Referee: Pratik Mondal
Man of the Match: Javier Siverio (Jamshedpur)

== Quarter-finals ==
Number of teams per tier still in competition
ISL	I-League	Total
7 / 13	1 / 12	8 / 25

26 April 2025
16:30 IST (UTC+5:30)
Match 8

Kerala Blasters	1–2	Mohun Bagan SG
Sreekuttan MS 90+4'	Report; PDF; Khel Now	Sahal 22'; Suhail 51'

Kalinga Stadium, Bhubaneswar
Attendance: 1,103
Referee: Venkatesh Ramachadran
Man of the Match: Salahudheen A.K. (Mohun Bagan)

26 April 2025
20:00 IST (UTC+5:30)
Match 9

Goa	2–1	Punjab
Herrera 89'; Yasir 90+4'	Report; PDF; Khel Now	Vidal 57'

Kalinga Stadium, Bhubaneswar
Attendance: 1,159
Referee: Aditya Purkayastha
Man of the Match: Borja Herrera (Goa)

27 April 2025
16:30 IST (UTC+5:30)
Match 10

Inter Kashi	0–1	Mumbai City
	Report; PDF; Khel Now	Chhangte 72'

Kalinga Stadium, Bhubaneswar
Attendance: 1,120
Referee: Tejas Nagvenkar
Man of the Match: Jorge Ortiz (Mumbai City)

27 April 2025
20:00 IST (UTC+5:30)
Match 11

Northeast United	0–0	Jamshedpur
	Report; PDF; Khel Now
Penalties
Guillermo (penalty missed); Zabaco (penalty missed); Bemammer (penalty scored); Ajaraie (penalty scored); Albiach (penalty scored); Thoi (penalty scored); Asheer (penalty missed)	4–5	(penalty scored) Siverio; (penalty missed) Murray; (penalty scored) Hernández; (penalty scored) Tachikawa; (penalty missed) Eze; (penalty scored) Ashutosh; (penalty scored) Cirkovic

Kalinga Stadium, Bhubaneswar
Attendance: 2,163
Referee: Harish Kundu
Man of the Match: Stephen Eze (Jamshedpur)

== Semi-finals ==
Number of teams per tier still in competition
ISL	I-League	Total
4 / 13	0 / 12	4 / 25

30 April 2025
16:30 IST (UTC+5:30)
Match 12

Mohun Bagan	1–3	Goa
Suhail 23'	Report; PDF; Khel Now	Brison 20'; Guarrotxena 51' (pen.); Herrera 58'

Kalinga Stadium, Bhubaneswar
Attendance: 2,103
Referee: Harish Kundu
Man of the Match: Borja Herrera (Goa)

30 April 2025
20:00 IST (UTC+5:30)
Match 13

Mumbai City	0–1	Jamshedpur
	Report; PDF; Khel Now	Tachikawa 87'

Kalinga Stadium, Bhubaneswar
Attendance: 1,320
Referee: Pratik Mondal
Man of the Match: Rei Tachikawa (Jamshedpur)

== Final ==
Number of teams per tier still in competition
ISL	I-League	Total
2 / 13	0 / 12	2 / 25

3 May 2025
19:30 IST (UTC+5:30)
Match 14

Goa	3–0	Jamshedpur
Herrera 23', 51'; Dražić 72'	Report; PDF; Khel Now

Kalinga Stadium, Bhubaneswar
Attendance: 7,156
Referee: Venkatesh Ramachadran
Man of the Match: Borja Herrera (Goa)

== Season statistics ==
=== Goalscorers ===
Source: AIFF

Rank	Goal Scores			
Rank	Player	Club	Apps	Goals
1	(Spain) Iker Guarrotxena	Goa	4	4
1	(Spain) Borja Herrera	Goa	4	4
2	(India) Lallianzuala Chhangte	Mumbai City	3	3
2	(Morocco) Alaaeddine Ajaraie	Northeast United	2	3
3	(Argentina) Ezequiel Vidal	Punjab	2	2
3	(India) Suhail Bhat	Mohun Bagan	2	2
4
4	(Bosnia and Herzegovina) Asmir Suljić	Punjab	1	1
4	(Australia) Ryan Williams	Bengaluru	1	1
4	(Serbia) Matija Babović	Inter Kashi	1	1
4	(India) Bipin Singh	Mumbai City	1	1
4	(India) Sahal Abdul Samad	Mohun Bagan	2	1
4	(Spain) Jesús Jiménez	Kerala Blasters	2	1
4	(Morocco) Noah Sadaoui	Kerala Blasters	2	1
4	(India) Sreekuttan MS	Kerala Blasters	2	1
4	(India) Nihal Sudeesh	Punjab	2	1
4	(India) Jithin MS	Northeast United	2	1
4	(Spain) Néstor Albiach	Northeast United	2	1
4	(Spain) Guillermo Fernández	Northeast United	2	1
4	(Greece) Nikolaos Karelis	Mumbai City	3	1
4	(Spain) Javier Siverio	Jamshedpur	4	1
4	(Nigeria) Stephen Eze	Jamshedpur	4	1
4	(Japan) Rei Tachikawa	Jamshedpur	4	1
4	(Serbia) Dejan Drazic	Goa	4	1
4	(India) Mohammad Yasir	Goa	4	1
4	(India) Brison Fernandes	Goa	4	1

=== Clean Sheets ===
Rank	Clean Sheets			
Rank	Player	Club	Apps	Clean Sheets
1	(India) Albino Gomes	Jamshedpur	4	3
2	(India) Rehenesh TP	Mumbai City	3	2
2	(India) Gurmeet Singh	Northeast United	2	2
2	(India) Hrithik Tiwari	FC Goa	4	2
3	(India) Sachin Suresh	Kerala Blasters	2	1
3	(India) Muheet Shabir	Punjab	2	1

== Awards ==
Award	Winner	Team	Prize
Best goalkeeper	(India) Albino Gomes	Jamshedpur	₹ 2,50,000
Top scorer	(Spain) Iker Guarrotxena	Goa	₹ 2,50,000
Top scorer	(Spain) Borja Herrera	Goa	₹ 2,50,000
Player of the tournament	(Spain) Borja Herrera	Goa	₹ 2,50,000
Runners-up	Jamshedpur		₹ 15,00,000
Champions	Goa		₹ 25,00,000

== Broadcasting ==
The entire 2025 Kalinga Super Cup April edition was streamed live on JioHotstar, with Star Sports 3 broadcasting matches from the quarter-finals onward.

== See also ==
- Men
  - 2024–25 Indian Super League (Tier I)
  - 2024–25 I-League (Tier II)
  - 2024–25 I-League 2 (Tier III)
  - 2024–25 I-League 3 (Tier IV)
  - 2024–25 Indian State Leagues (Tier V)
  - 2024 Durand Cup
  - 2025 Durand Cup
  - 2025 RFD League
- Women
  - 2024–25 Indian Women's League
  - 2024–25 Indian Women's League 2
