= Eduardo Kau =

Brazilian footballer

Personal information
- Full name: Eduardo de Sousa Santos
- Date of birth: 17 January 1999 (age 27)
- Place of birth: Brasília, Brazil
- Height: 1.90 m (6 ft 3 in)
- Position: Centre-back

Senior career*
Years	Team	Apps	(Gls)
–2019	Avaí		
2019–2022	B-SAD	4	(0)
2021–2022	→ B-SAD U23 (loan)	5	(0)
2023	Sfîntul Gheorghe	4	(0)
2023–2024	Persikabo 1973	12	(0)
2024–2025	Xewkija Tigers	16	(1)
2025–2026	Ayutthaya United	0	(0)
2026	Chennaiyin	11	(0)
- * Club domestic league appearances and goals as of 23:11, 16 May 2026 (UTC)

Eduardo de Sousa Santos (born 17 January 1999), commonly known as Eduardo Kau, is a Brazilian professional footballer who plays as a defender.

== Club career ==
=== B-SAD ===
In 2019 season, Eduardo signed a contract with B-SAD until 2023 season, who plays in the Primeira Liga. He made his debut with the team on 25 August 2019. In that match, he played full 90 minutes. This match ended in a draw 0–0 against Santa Clara. Eduardo has suffered a ruptured anterior cruciate ligament in his left knee and will be out for around six months, the Lisbon club announced on Thursday, 19 September 2019, he is in his first season in Portugal, coming from Avaí, in Brazil, and has played in three official games, in which he has played a total of 202 minutes.

=== Sfîntul Gheorghe ===
In 2023, Eduardo signed a contract with Moldovan Super Liga club Sfîntul Gheorghe. He made his league debut with the team on 9 April 2023 in a 1–0 away lose against Moldovan champions, Sheriff Tiraspol.

=== Persikabo 1973 ===
In November 2023, Eduardo officially signed a contract with Persikabo 1973 in Liga 1. He entered the team in the second round replacing the previous foreign player from France, Messemo Bakayoko who was injured. He made his debut with the team on 3 December 2023 during the home match against Bhayangkara which ended in a 2–2 draw. He played as a substitute and came on in the 82nd minute.
