= Pedro Astray =

Spanish footballer

Personal information
- Full name: Pedro Astray López
- Date of birth: 18 March 1992 (age 34)
- Place of birth: Vitoria-Gasteiz, Spain
- Height: 1.80 m (5 ft 11 in)
- Position: Central midfielder

Youth career
- 2002–2005: Real Madrid
- 2005–2011: Atlético Madrid

Senior career*
Years	Team	Apps	(Gls)
2011–2013	Atlético Madrid C	26	(2)
2013–2014	Collado Villalba	22	(5)
2014–2016	Getafe B	50	(9)
2015	Getafe	2	(0)
2016–2017	Senica	8	(0)
2017	San Sebastián Reyes	11	(0)
2017–2018	Guadalajara	33	(6)
2018–2019	Navalcarnero	13	(2)
2019	Stuttgarter Kickers	11	(1)
2019–2020	Xerez Deportivo	17	(0)
2020	Gimnástica Segoviana	0	(0)
2020–2021	Horta	8	(2)
2021–2022	Zamora	17	(0)
2022–2023	Cerdanyola	12	(0)
2023–2025	Gimnástica Segoviana	71	(4)
2025	Bodoland	0	(0)
2025–2026	Rajasthan United	4	(2)
- * Club domestic league appearances and goals as of 22:33, 17 March 2026 (UTC)

Pedro Astray López (born 18 March 1992) is a Spanish footballer who plays as a midfielder.

== Club career ==
Born in Vitoria-Gasteiz, Álava, Basque Country Astray joined Atlético Madrid's youth setup in 2005, aged 13. He made his senior debuts with the C-team in the 2011–12 season, in Tercera División.

In August 2013, the free agent Astray signed for CU Collado Villalba, also in the fourth division. On 31 January 2014 he moved to Getafe CF B, in Segunda División B.

On 7 January 2015 Astray played his first match with the main squad, coming on as a second half substitute for Diego Castro in a 1–1 away draw against UD Almería, for the campaign's Copa del Rey.

=== Rajasthan United ===
On 28 October 2025, Astray joined Rajasthan United ahead of the 2025–26 season. He made his debut for the club on 4 November 2025 in a Super Cup group stage match against Mumbai City, contributing to a 1–0 victory. On 6 November 2025, Astray scored his first goal for the club, a header from a corner, in a match against SC Delhi.

He carried his form into the Indian Football League, scoring two goals in his first four matches of the season. During his fourth league appearance against Real Kashmir, he suffered a left foot fracture and was set to undergo surgery following medical assessment.
