= Chema (footballer, born 1997) =

Spanish footballer

Personal information
- Full name: José Manuel Núñez Martín
- Date of birth: 16 September 1997 (age 29)
- Place of birth: La Puebla del Río, Spain
- Height: 1.75 m (5 ft 9 in)
- Position: Attacking midfielder

Team information
- Current team: Murcia

Youth career
- Puebla
- Sevilla
- 2009–2011: Coria
- 2011–2013: Betis
- 2013–2014: Puebla
- 2014–2015: Coria
- 2015–2016: Almería

Senior career*
| Years | Team | Apps | (Gls) |
| 2015 | Coria | 1 | (0) |
| 2016–2018 | Almería B | 76 | (19) |
| 2018–2020 | Almería | 37 | (1) |
| 2020 | → Albacete (loan) | 12 | (0) |
| 2020–2021 | Albacete | 13 | (0) |
| 2021 | → Betis B (loan) | 10 | (1) |
| 2021–2023 | Real Unión | 39 | (2) |
| 2023–2025 | Antequera | 73 | (3) |
| 2025–2026 | NorthEast United | 0 | (0) |
| 2026 | Stal Mielec | 12 | (1) |
| 2026– | Murcia | 0 | (0) |
- * Club domestic league appearances and goals as of 20:53, 26 May 2026 (UTC)

José Manuel Núñez Martín (born 16 September 1997), commonly known as Chema or Chema Núñez, is a Spanish professional footballer who plays as a midfielder for Primera Federación – Group 2 club Murcia. Mainly an attacking midfielder, he can also play as right winger.

== Club career ==
Chema was born in La Puebla del Río, Seville, Andalusia, and represented Puebla CF (two stints), Sevilla FC, Coria CF (two stints) and Real Betis as a youth. He made his first-team debut for Coria on 28 February 2015, coming on as a late substitute in a 4–0 Tercera División away routing of UD Los Barrios.

On 15 August 2015 Chema joined UD Almería, returning to youth football. He was promoted to the reserves the following August, and scored his first senior goal on 9 October 2016 in a 4–1 home defeat of Dos Hermanas CF.

Chema was definitely promoted to the main squad in Segunda División ahead of the 2018–19 campaign, and made his professional debut on 17 August 2018, starting in a 0–1 away loss against Cádiz CF. He scored his first professional goal on 23 September, netting the last in a 2–0 away defeat of CD Numancia.

On 28 May 2019, Chema extended his contract until 2021. The following 22 January, he was loaned to Albacete Balompié for the remainder of the season.

On 17 September 2020, Chema terminated his contract with Almería, and signed a two-year contract with Alba just hours later. The following 1 February, he moved to Real Betis' B-team on loan for the remainder of the season.

== Honours ==
NorthEast United

- Durand Cup: 2025
