= David Timor =

Spanish footballer

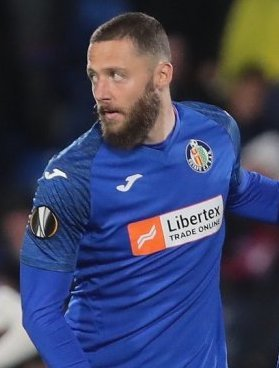
- Timor with Getafe in 2019

Personal information
- Full name: David Timor Copoví
- Date of birth: 17 October 1989 (age 37)
- Place of birth: Carcaixent, Spain
- Height: 1.85 m (6 ft 1 in)
- Position: Midfielder

Team information
- Current team: Intercity
- Number: 5

Youth career
- Valencia

Senior career*
Years	Team	Apps	(Gls)
2008–2010	Valencia B	49	(4)
2010–2011	Osasuna B	30	(7)
2011–2014	Osasuna	41	(1)
2013–2014	→ Girona (loan)	36	(7)
2014–2016	Valladolid	52	(5)
2016–2017	Leganés	41	(4)
2017–2018	Girona	19	(2)
2018–2019	Las Palmas	37	(1)
2019–2022	Getafe	59	(3)
2022–2023	Huesca	52	(0)
2023–2025	Eldense	67	(1)
2025–2026	Goa	0	(0)
2026–	Intercity	7	(0)
- * Club domestic league appearances and goals as of 16 May 2026

David Timor Copoví (born 17 October 1989) is a Spanish professional footballer who plays as a central midfielder for Segunda Federación club Intercity.

He amassed La Liga totals of 143 games and eight goals over nine seasons, with Osasuna, Leganés, Girona and Getafe. He added 261 appearances and 16 goals in the Segunda División.

== Club career ==
Born in Carcaixent, Valencian Community, Timor was a product of Valencia CF's youth ranks. He made his senior debut with the reserves, playing two seasons in the Segunda División B and suffering relegation in the second.

Timor signed for CA Osasuna in summer 2010, but spent the vast majority of his first year with the B team also in the third division. He made his debut with the main squad on 23 April 2011, playing the last ten minutes of a 2–0 La Liga away defeat against eventual champions FC Barcelona. He scored his first goal in the competition on 30 September 2012, contributing a penalty to the 4–0 home win over Levante UD.

On 16 July 2013, Timor joined Segunda División club Girona FC in a season-long loan. On 25 July of the following year, he agreed to a three-year contract with Real Valladolid also in the second tier.

Timor moved to CD Leganés on 26 January 2016, on a deal until 2018. He scored twice in 17 appearances, as they achieved top-flight promotion for the first time ever.

On 1 September 2017, Timor returned to Girona after signing a three-year contract. The following 31 August, he put pen to paper on a four-year deal with UD Las Palmas of division two.

Timor joined Getafe CF on a three-year contract on 29 August 2019, after becoming a free agent. On 21 January 2022, having featured sparingly during the campaign, he terminated his contract with the club and signed a two-and-a-half-year deal with SD Huesca just hours later.

Timor left the Estadio El Alcoraz on 5 July 2023, after his link expired, and joined CD Eldense of the same league seven days later. He totalled 70 games during his spell, scoring his only goal in the 2–1 away victory against Elche CF on 26 May 2024.

On 30 July 2025, aged 35, Timor moved abroad for the first time in his career, signing with Indian Super League side FC Goa. He returned to Spain shortly after, on a one-and-a-half-year contract at Segunda Federación's CF Intercity.

== Career statistics ==
As of match played 15 March 2026

Appearances and goals by club, season and competition
Club	Season	League			National Cup (Note: Includes Copa del Rey, AIFF Super Cup)		Continental		Other		Total	
Club	Season	Division	Apps	Goals	Apps	Goals	Apps	Goals	Apps	Goals	Apps	Goals
Valencia B	2008–09	Segunda División B	17	2	—		—		—		17	2
Valencia B	2009–10	Segunda División B	32	2	—		—		—		32	2
Valencia B	Total		49	4	—		—		—		49	4
Osasuna B	2010–11	Segunda División B	30	7	—		—		—		30	7
Osasuna	2010–11	La Liga	1	0	0	0	—		—		1	0
Osasuna	2011–12	La Liga	24	0	3	0	—		—		27	0
Osasuna	2012–13	La Liga	16	1	3	0	—		—		19	1
Osasuna	Total		41	1	6	0	—		—		47	1
Girona (loan)	2013–14	Segunda División	36	7	3	1	—		—		39	8
Valladolid	2014–15	Segunda División	34	5	3	1	—		1 (Note: Appearance in La Liga play-offs)	0	38	6
Valladolid	2015–16	Segunda División	18	0	0	0	—		—		18	0
Valladolid	Total		52	5	3	1	0	0	1	0	56	6
Leganés	2015–16	Segunda División	17	2	0	0	—		—		17	2
Leganés	2016–17	La Liga	24	2	1	0	—		—		25	2
Leganés	2017–18	La Liga	0	0	0	0	—		—		0	0
Leganés	Total		41	4	1	0	—		—		42	4
Girona	2017–18	La Liga	17	2	2	0	—		—		19	2
Girona	2018–19	La Liga	2	0	0	0	—		—		2	0
Girona	Total		19	2	2	0	—		—		21	2
Las Palmas	2018–19	Segunda División	35	1	0	0	—		—		35	1
Las Palmas	2019–20	Segunda División	2	0	0	0	—		—		2	0
Las Palmas	Total		37	1	0	0	—		—		37	1
Getafe	2019–20	La Liga	22	3	2	0	7 (Note: Appearances in UEFA Europa League)	0	—		31	3
Getafe	2020–21	La Liga	30	0	1	0	—		—		31	0
Getafe	2021–22	La Liga	7	0	1	0	—		—		8	0
Getafe	Total		59	3	4	0	7	0	—		70	3
Huesca	2021–22	Segunda División	17	0	0	0	—		—		17	0
Huesca	2022–23	Segunda División	35	0	1	0	—		—		36	0
Huesca	Total		52	0	1	0	—		—		53	0
Eldense	2023–24	Segunda División	37	1	0	0	—		—		37	1
Eldense	2024–25	Segunda División	30	0	3	0	—		—		33	0
Eldense	Total		67	1	3	0	—		—		70	1
Goa	2025–26	Indian Super League	0	0	5	1	4 (Note: Appearances in AFC Champions League Two)	0	—		9	1
Intercity	2025–26	Segunda Federación	6	0	—		—		—		6	0
Career total			489	35	28	3	11	0	1	0	529	38
