= Fatorda =

- Town
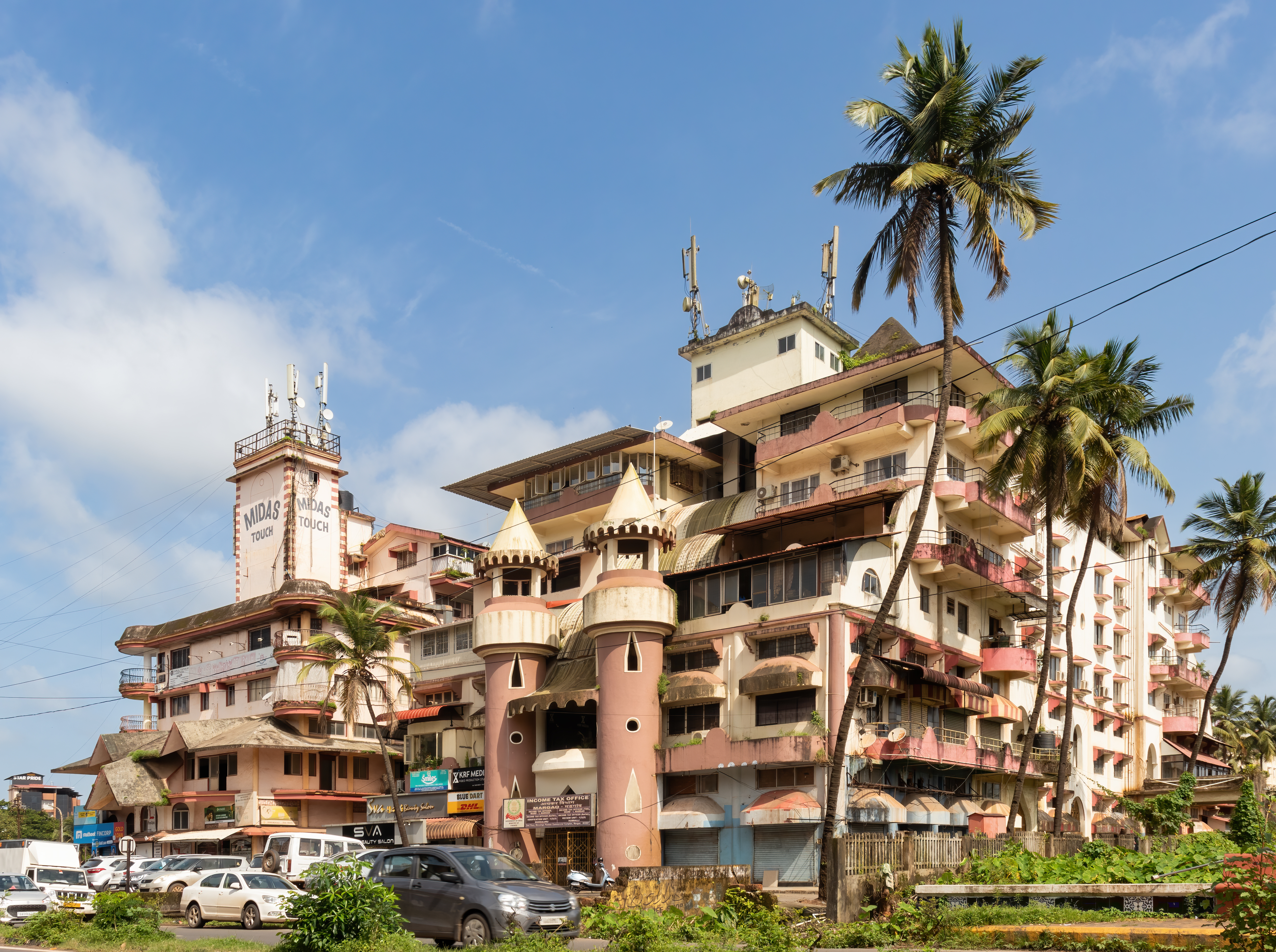
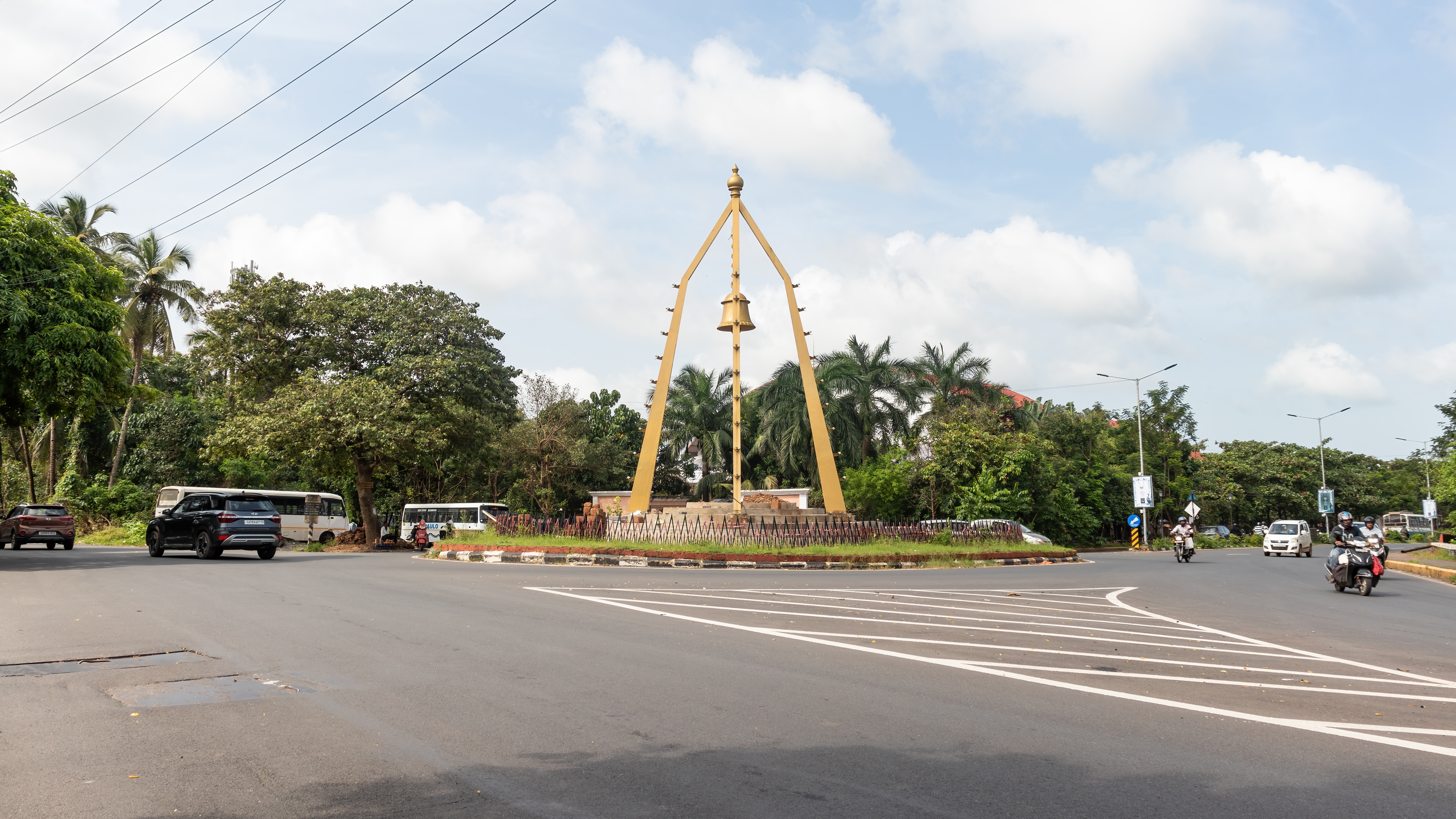
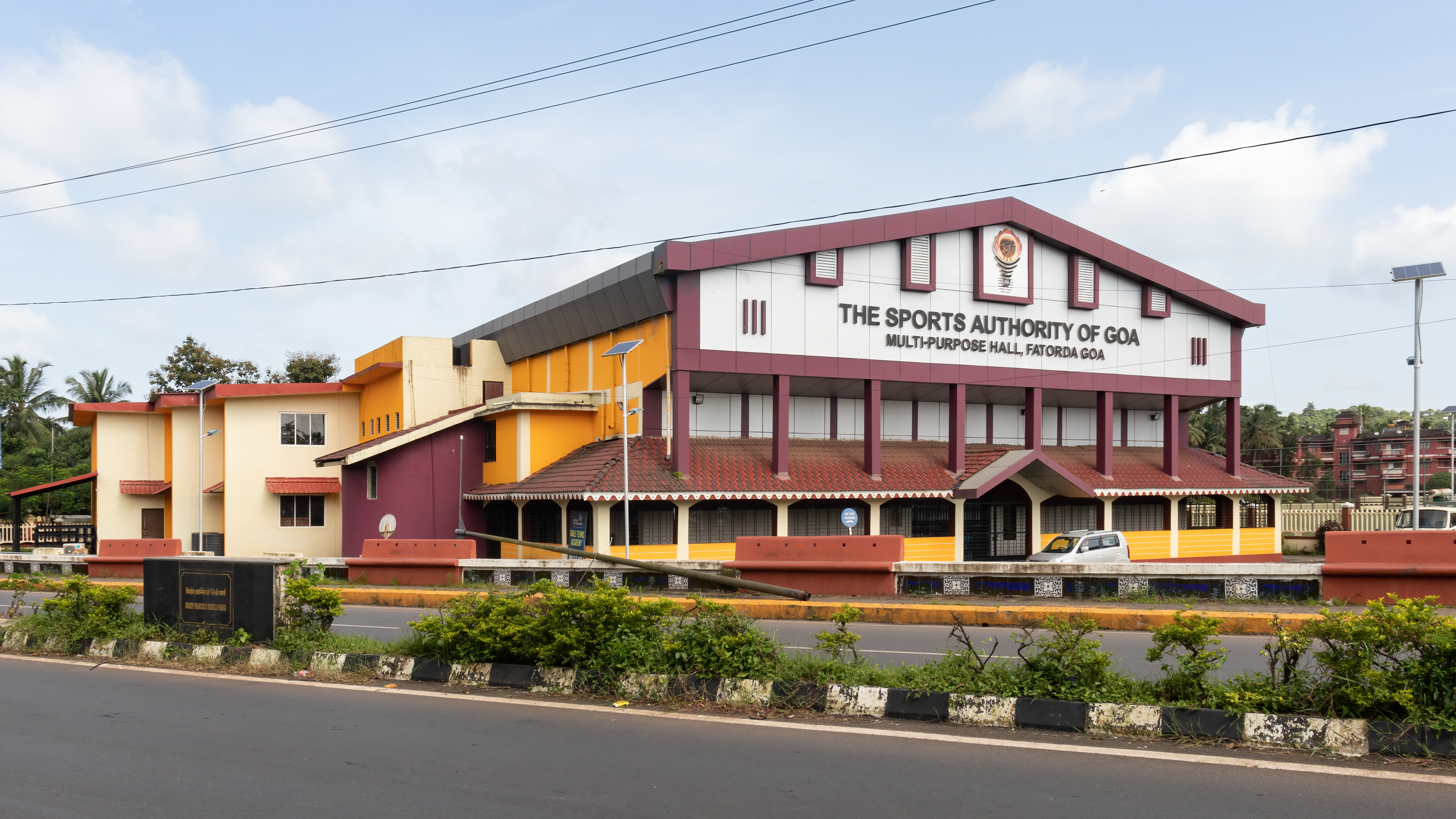
- Top to bottom: Business center of Fatorda, Shree Damodar Circle Bell and The Sports Authority of Goa building

- Location of Fatorda in Goa Fatorda (India)
- Coordinates: 15°17′28″N 73°57′45″E
- Country: India
- State: Goa
- District: South Goa
- Sub-district: Salcete
- City: Margao

Government
  - MLA: Vijai Sardesai
- Time zone: UTC+5:30 (IST)
- Postal code: 403602
- Vehicle registration: GA
- Website: www.goa.gov.in

Fatorda is a suburb of the city of Margao in Salcete, Goa. Fatorda has been originally home to the traditional Scheduled Tribe/Scheduled Caste population. The Catholic Gawda community has a very large presence in Fatorda. However, due to the increasing number of buildings in Fatorda, the population has become more diverse.

Fatorda is also a constituency (30-Fatorda) in the Goa Legislative Assembly.

== Population ==
Fatorda has a large number of people belonging to the aboriginal Gawda community. Luis Alex Cardozo, fondly known as "Mama" Cardozo, was the leader of the Gawda community and represented the Fatorda constituency in Goa state Assembly for a long time. However, the population of Fatorda has now become diverse. A number of non- Goans have now made Fatorda their home and this suburb maintains a diverse population. A multiple number of multi-storeyed residential complexes in Fatorda have led to Fatorda being a thriving suburb with a population of many communities. Although Goan Catholic Gawdas and Hindus form a dominant part of the population, there is a considerable number of Muslims in Fatorda who stay in areas such as Chandrawada.

== Education ==
Fatorda has a few government primary and high schools. There are a few private primary level schools in Fatorda.

There also exist private and aided High Schools in Fatorda. A prominent High School in Fatorda is the Diocesan Society of Education's 'Our Lady of Rosary High School'. A Higher Secondary named the Jawaharlal Nehru Higher Secondary School also exists in Fatorda.

Located in Fatorda is the Don Bosco College of Engineering www.dbcegoa.ac.in - The Fatorda Salesians Society's, which is operated by Salesian priests. It hosted the relics of St. John Bosco during its world tour, on 21 and 22 August 2011. The Parvatibai Chowgule College, Adarsh Institute of Management and the Jawaharlal Nehru Higher Secondary School are also located in Fatorda.

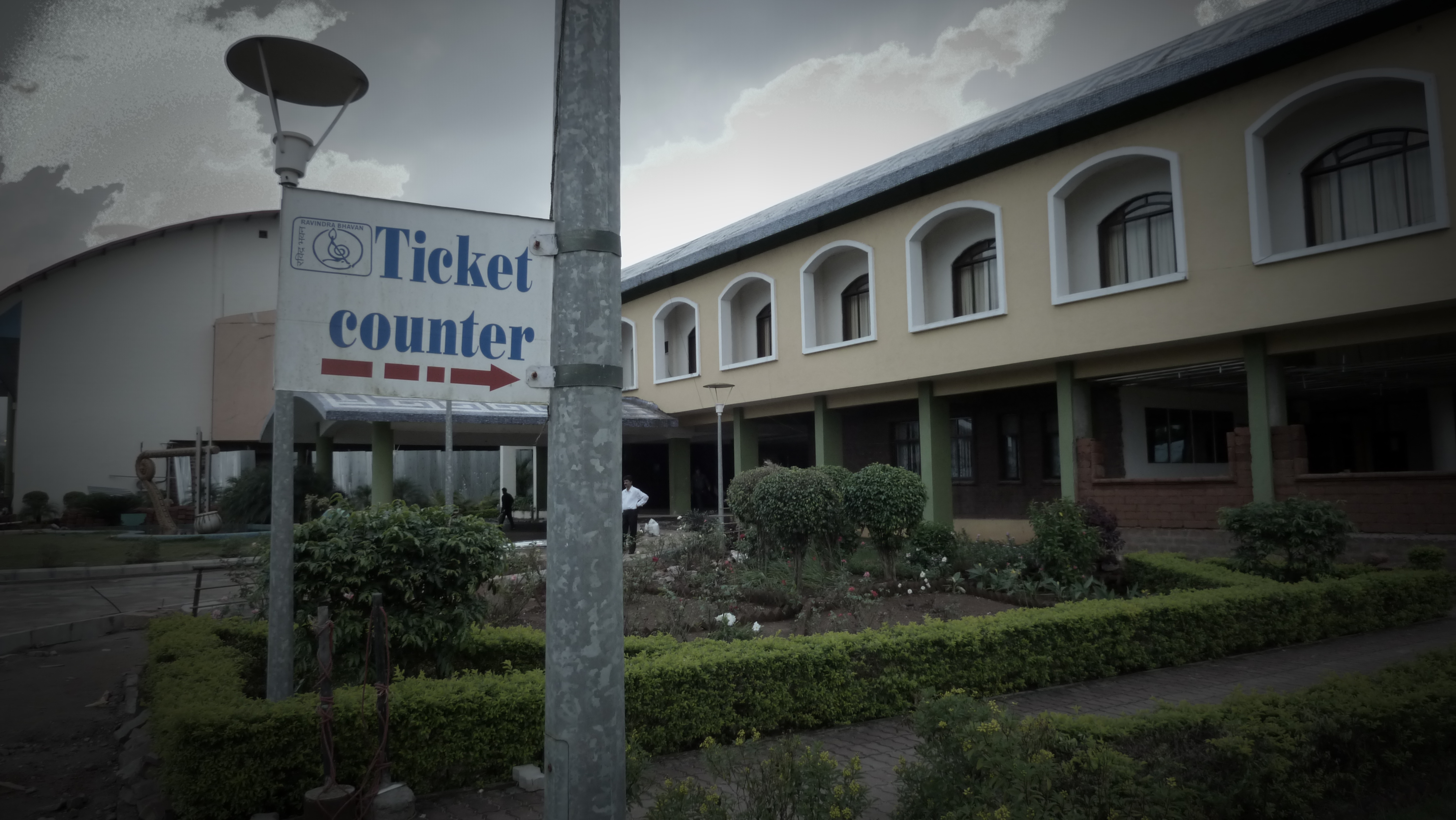
Ravindra Bhavan in Fatorda

== Landmarks ==
Fatorda Stadium, named after Jawaharlal Nehru, is a multi-purpose stadium, mainly used for football. Built in the late 1980s, this is Goa's main stadium, having a seating capacity of 19,000 and has hosted a number of international football matches and a lesser number of One Day International cricket matches. It is widely used for the Indian national football league games.

The main bus stand serving South Goa also lies in Fatorda, after being shifted out of Margão to reduce traffic congestion in the centre of Margão. Fatorda also has a few bars and multi cuisine restaurants. Housing includes villas and apartments. The South Goa District Collectorate office is also located in Fatorda.

== Governance ==
Fatorda is a part of the South Goa Lok Sabha Constituency and the Fatorda Assembly Constituency. Fatorda is under Margao Municipal Council's jurisdiction. Of the total 25 wards of the Margao Municipal Council, 11 constitute the electorate from Fatorda.

Fatorda has a police station and a post office.

== Culture ==
There is a church in Fatorda known as the Our Lady of Rosary Church and also a chapel. A school known as the Rosary School is also located in the Rosary Church Complex. One can also find a temple known as the Shree Damodar Ling Devasthan located near the Stadium. It is considered as the original abode of Lord Damodar, before he was shifted to Zambaulim. The Ravindra Bhavan Margao is also located in Fatorda. It is a cultural centre and promotes Tiatr, drama, art and culture. The 42nd International Film Festival of India was inaugurated at the Ravindra Bhavan Margao by bollywood actor Shahrukh Khan in 2011.

== Gallery ==
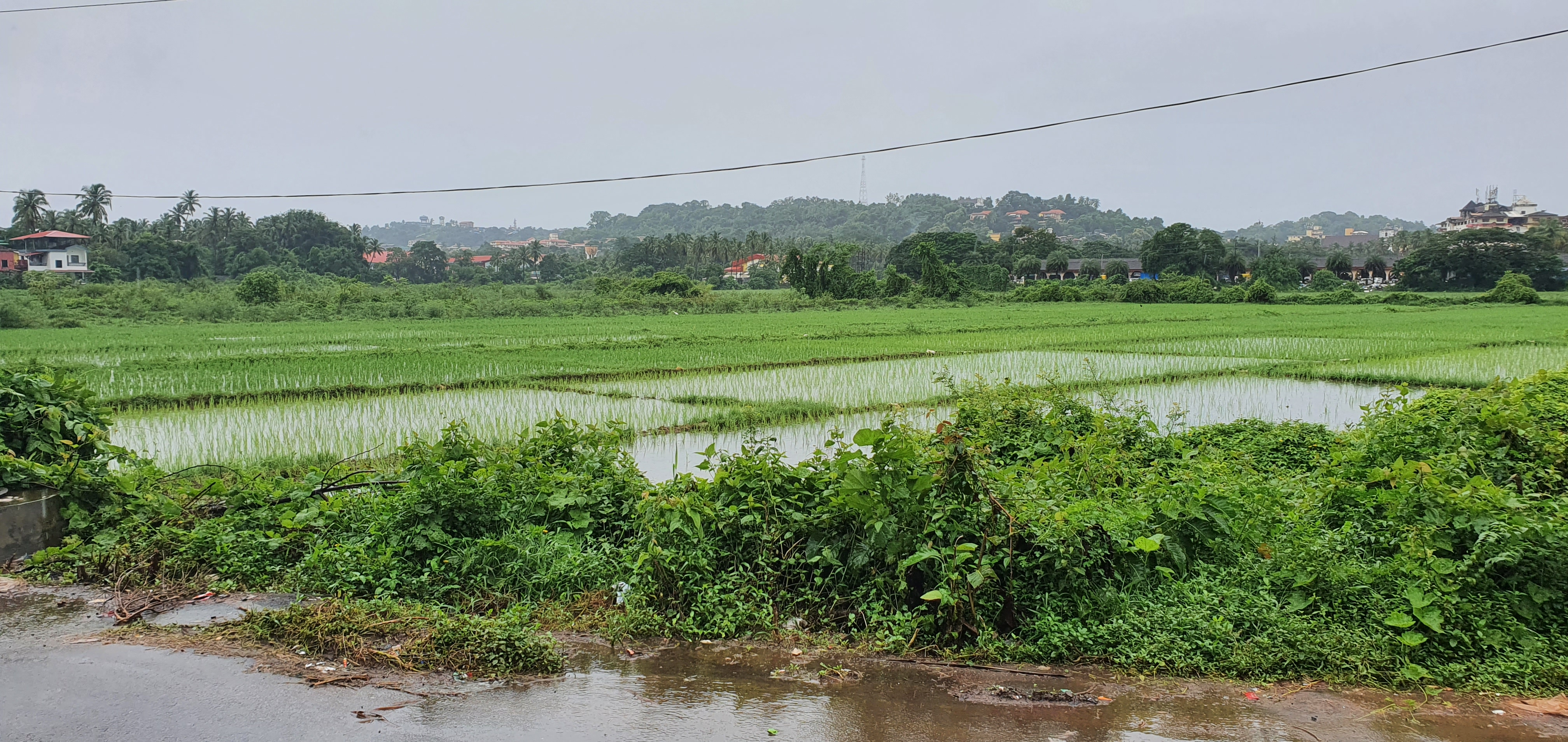
Fields of Fatorda, located near SPGDA Market
Images from Fatorda, Goa, India
