= Hrithik Tiwari =

Indian footballer (born 2002)

Personal information
- Date of birth: 10 January 2002 (age 24)
- Place of birth: Assam, India
- Height: 1.90 m (6 ft 3 in)
- Position: Goalkeeper

Team information
- Current team: Odisha

Youth career
- –2019: SAI Guwahati
- 2019-2021: Goa

Senior career*
Years	Team	Apps	(Gls)
2021–2026	Goa	30	(0)
2026–	Odisha	1	(0)
Medal record
Representing India
CAFA Nations Cup
Third place	2025 Tajikistan–Uzbekistan	Team
- * Club domestic league appearances and goals as of 16 October 2026

Hrithik Tiwari (born 10 January 2002) is an Indian professional footballer who plays as a goalkeeper for Indian Super League club Odisha.

== Club career ==
=== Early career ===
After spending his early years at SAI Guwahati, Hrithik joined the Goa youth set-up. After a season with the youth teams, Hrithik was promoted to join the club's development team. Hrithik played a pivotal part in helping Goa finish top of the Goa Zone of the Hero Elite League in 2019, before the season was cut short due to the pandemic.

=== Goa ===
After impressive performances at youth level, Hrithik was promoted to the Goa's senior team in 2021. Hritik made his senior debut for the club in the 2021 Durand Cup on 17 September 2021, playing the full 90 minutes and keeping a clean sheet against Jamshedpur II, as Goa won 5–0.

Hrithik made his senior league debut on 6 March 2022 in the final game of the 2021–22 season, at home against Kerala Blasters. The game eventually ended in a 4–4 draw.

However, Hrithik got no game time for the next two seasons, until the 2024–25 season. Following an injury to first-choice goalkeeper Laxmikant Kattimani, and second-choice goalkeeper Lara Sharma not at full fitness, Goa head coach Manolo Márquez trusted Hrithik against Bengaluru. In the game, Hrithik went on to keep a clean sheet in an eventual 3–0 win for the Gaurs. Later Hrithik kept his place in the team, remaining first-choice goalkeeper even after Lara Sharma returned to full fitness.

On February 6, 2025, Hrithik saved a penalty from Diego Mauricio, as Goa went on to beat Odisha 2–1 at home.

== Career statistics ==
=== Club ===
As of 15 February 2026

Club	Season	League			Cup		AFC		Total	
Club	Season	Division	Apps	Goals	Apps	Goals	Apps	Goals	Apps	Goals
FC Goa	2020–21	Indian Super League	0	0	1	0	–		1	0
FC Goa	2021–22	Indian Super League	1	0	0	0	–		1	0
FC Goa	2022–23	Indian Super League	0	0	4	0	–		4	0
FC Goa	2023–24	Indian Super League	0	0	1	0	–		1	0
FC Goa	2024–25	Indian Super League	16	0	3	0	–		19	0
FC Goa	2025–26	Indian Super League	1	0	4	0	—		5	0
Career total			18	0	13	0	0	0	31	0

== Honours ==
Individual

- Indian Super League Golden Glove: 2025-26
