= Sahil Tavora =

Indian footballer (born 1995)

Personal information
- Full name: Dom Sahil Krishe de Noronha Tavora
- Date of birth: 19 October 1995 (age 31)
- Place of birth: Panaji, Goa, India
- Height: 1.80 m (5 ft 11 in)
- Position: Defensive midfielder

Team information
- Current team: Kerala Blasters

Youth career
- Brasil Futebol Academia
- Sesa Football Academy
- 2013–2015: Dempo

Senior career*
Years	Team	Apps	(Gls)
2015–2016	Dempo	0	(0)
2016–2017	Goa	6	(2)
2017–2018	Mumbai City	8	(0)
2018–2019	GDSC Alvarenga	26	(1)
2019–2024	Hyderabad	62	(1)
2024	→ Punjab (loan)	10	(0)
2024–2026	Goa	30	(2)
2026–	Kerala Blasters	0	(0)

International career
2014	India U20	4	(1)
- * Club domestic league appearances and goals as of 09 October 2026

Dom Sahil Krishe de Noronha Tavora (born 19 October 1995) is an Indian professional footballer who plays as a defensive midfielder for Indian Super League club Kerala Blasters.

== Career ==
=== Earlier career ===
Born in Goa, Tavora was a part of both the Brasil Futebol Academia and Sesa Football Academy before signing with Arthur Papas managed Dempo in September 2013.

=== FC Goa ===
On 19 August 2016, it was announced that Tavora had signed with Goa of the Indian Super League. He made his professional debut for the team on 8 October 2016 against Pune City. He came on as an 82nd-minute substitute for Mandar Rao Desai.

=== GDSC Alvarenga ===
In 2018, Tavora moved abroad and signed with Campeonato de Portugal side GDSC Alvarenga on 1 July.

=== Hyderabad ===
In 2019, he came back to India after signing with Indian Super League side Hyderabad. In the 2020–21 season, after having a goalless draw against FC Goa, they narrowly missed the play-offs as they finished 5th in the league table. He scored an important goal in the Final of 2021–22 Indian Super League against Kerala Blasters and lifted the trophy through penalty-shootout.

== Career statistics ==
=== Club ===
As of 10 April 2024

Club	Season	League			Cup		AFC		Total	
Club	Season	Division	Apps	Goals	Apps	Goals	Apps	Goals	Apps	Goals
Goa	2016	Indian Super League	6	2	0	0	–		6	2
Mumbai City	2017–18	Indian Super League	8	0	2 (Note: Appearance(s) in Super Cup)	0	–		10	0
GDSC Alvarenga	2018–19	Campeonato de Portugal	26	1	–		–		26	1
Hyderabad	2019–20	Indian Super League	2	0	0	0	–		2	0
Hyderabad	2020–21	Indian Super League	10	0	0	0	–		10	0
Hyderabad	2021–22	Indian Super League	19	0	0	0	–		19	0
Hyderabad	2022–23	Indian Super League	21	0	5 (Note: Appearance(s) in Durand Cup)	0	1 (Note: Appearance in Indian club qualifiers for 2023–24 AFC competitions)	0	27	0
Hyderabad	2023–24	Indian Super League	10	0	3	0	–		13	0
Hyderabad	Total		62	1	8	0	1	0	71	1
Punjab (loan)	2023–24	Indian Super League	10	0	0	0	–		10	0
Goa	2024–25	Indian Super League	0	0	0	0	–		0	0
Career total			112	2	10	0	1	0	123	2

== Honours ==
India U20 (Goa India)

- Lusofonia Games Gold medal: 2014

Hyderabad FC

- Indian Super League: 2021–22

== See also ==
- List of Indian football players in foreign leagues
