= Borja Herrera =

Spanish footballer (born 1993)

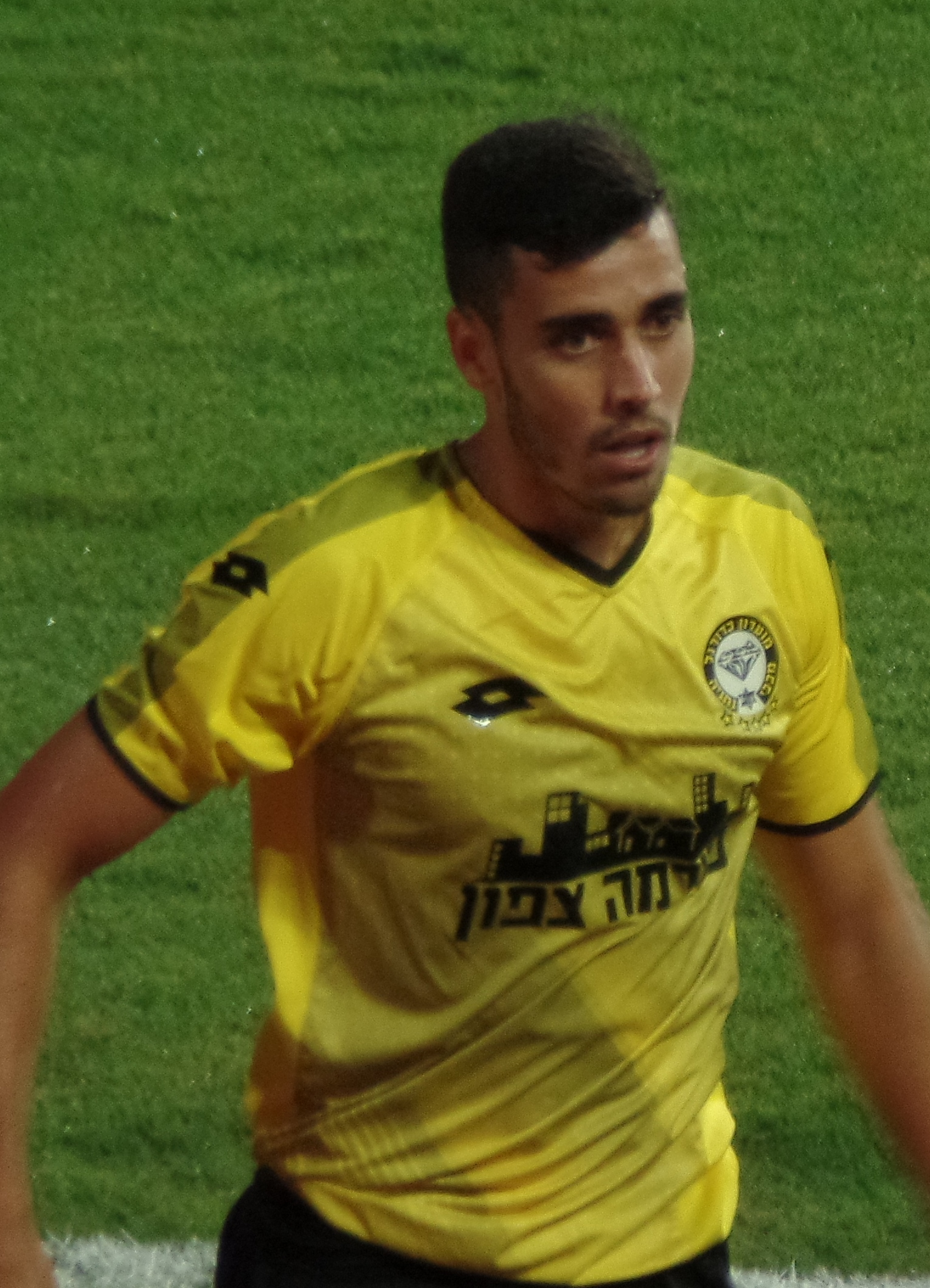
- Herrera with Maccabi Netanya 2019

Personal information
- Full name: Borja Herrera González
- Date of birth: 8 January 1993 (age 33)
- Place of birth: Las Palmas, Spain
- Height: 1.78 m (5 ft 10 in)
- Position: Midfielder

Team information
- Current team: Persijap Jepara
- Number: 88

Youth career
- 2003–2005: Las Palmas
- 2005–2012: Huracán

Senior career*
Years	Team	Apps	(Gls)
2012–2014	Unión Viera	53	(13)
2014	Tudelano	17	(1)
2014–2017	Las Palmas B	85	(19)
2017–2018	Las Palmas	3	(0)
2018	→ Real Valladolid (loan)	5	(0)
2018–2019	Reus	18	(1)
2019	Albacete	9	(0)
2019	Maccabi Netanya	5	(0)
2020–2021	Andorra	11	(0)
2021–2022	Unionistas de Salamanca	11	(0)
2022	Tamaraceite	14	(4)
2022–2023	Hyderabad	22	(4)
2023–2024	East Bengal	9	(1)
2024–2025	Goa	36	(8)
2026–	Persijap Jepara	14	(2)
- * Club domestic league appearances and goals as of 4 May 2026

Borja Herrera González (born 8 January 1993) is a Spanish professional footballer who plays as a midfielder for Super League club Persijap Jepara.

== Club career ==
Born in Las Palmas, Canary Islands, Herrera finished his formation with AD Huracán. He made his debut as a senior with CF Unión Viera during the 2012–13 season, in Tercera División.

On 31 January 2014, Herrera joined CD Tudelano in Segunda División B. On 12 July 2014 he moved to UD Las Palmas, the club he already represented as a youth, being assigned to the reserves also in the third division.

On 11 July 2016, Herrera extended his contract until 2018. The following 13 June, after helping the B-side in their promotion to the third division, he was promoted to the main squad ahead of the 2017–18 campaign.

Herrera made his first team – and La Liga – debut on 24 September 2017, starting in a 0–2 home loss against CD Leganés. The following 25 January, he was loaned to Segunda División side Real Valladolid until June.

On 31 July 2018, after achieving promotion with the Blanquivioletas and suffering relegation with the Amarillos, Herrera signed a three-year deal with CF Reus Deportiu in the second level. He scored his first professional goal the following 6 January, netting the opener in a 3–0 away defeat of Málaga CF.

On 24 January 2019, Herrera left the Catalans due to the club's poor financial situation overall. Two days later, he agreed to an 18-month contract with fellow league team Albacete Balompié.

On 19 July 2019, Herrera signed a two-year contract with Maccabi Netanya from the Israeli Premier League.

On 6 August 2020, signed in Andorra.

In July 2022, Herrera moved to India and signed with defending Indian Super League champions Hyderabad FC. He made his debut on 13 October 2022, against NorthEast United, coming on as 71st-minute substitute and scoring his debut goal two minutes later.

On 12 June 2023, Herrera joined East Bengal on a one-year deal. He won the 2024 Super Cup with East Bengal.

On 30 January 2024, Herrera joined FC Goa on loan until the end of the 2023–24 season, reuniting with his Las Palmas and Hyderabad FC coach Manolo Márquez.

=== FC Goa ===
Herrera signed a short-term contract in January 2024 with Indian Super League club FC Goa, which in-turn led to permanent deal for the 2024–25 season with the club. On 27 September 2024, he scored a hattrick against East Bengal in the league, which led his team to a 3–2 victory.

On 26 December 2025, due to uncertainty surrounding the future of the ISL, Goa confirmed they had mutually parted ways with Herrera.

=== Persijap Jepara ===
On 30 December 2025, Super League club Persijap Jepara announced the signing of Herrera on a year contract.

== Career statistics ==
=== Club ===
As of match played 7 February 2026

Appearances and goals by club, season and competition
Club	Season	League			National cup (Note: Includes Copa del Rey, Israel State Cup, Super Cup)		Continental		Other		Total	
Club	Season	Division	Apps	Goals	Apps	Goals	Apps	Goals	Apps	Goals	Apps	Goals
Tudelano	2013–14	Segunda División B	13	0	0	0	—		—		13	0
Las Palmas B	2014–15	Segunda División B	19	1	0	0	—		—		19	1
Las Palmas	2017–18	La Liga	3	0	3	0	—		—		6	0
Real Valladolid (loan)	2017–18	Segunda División	5	0	0	0	—		—		5	0
Reus	2018–19	Segunda División	18	1	1	0	—		—		19	1
Albacete	2018–19	Segunda División	9	0	0	0	—		—		9	0
Maccabi Netanya	2019–20	Israeli Premier League	4	0	1	0	—		5 (Note: Appearances in Toto Cup)	0	10	0
Andorra	2020–21	Segunda División B	11	0	1	0	—		—		12	0
Unionistas de Salamanca	2021–22	Primera División RFEF	11	0	1	0	—		—		12	0
Tamaraceite	2021–22	Segunda División RFEF	14	4	0	0	—		—		14	4
Hyderabad	2022–23	Indian Super League	22	4	3	0	—		6 (Note: Five appearances and one goal in Durand Cup, one appearance in play-offs for AFC Cup)	1	31	5
East Bengal	2023–24	Indian Super League	9	1	4	0	—		6 (Note: Appearances in Durand Cup)	0	19	1
Goa (loan)	2023–24	Indian Super League	14	2	0	0	—		0	0	14	2
Goa		Indian Super League										
Goa	2024–25	Indian Super League	22	6	4	4	—		0	0	26	10
Goa	2025–26	Indian Super League	0	0	5	2	6 (Note: Appearances in AFC Champions League Two)	0	0	0	11	2
Total			36	8	9	6	6	0	0	0	51	14
Persijap Jepara	2025–26	Super League	3	0	0	0	—		0	0	3	0
Career total			177	19	23	6	6	0	17	1	223	26

== Honours ==
East Bengal

- Super Cup: 2024

Goa

- Super Cup: 2025
- Bandodkar Trophy: 2024
