= Kevin Sibille =

Argentine footballer (born 1998)

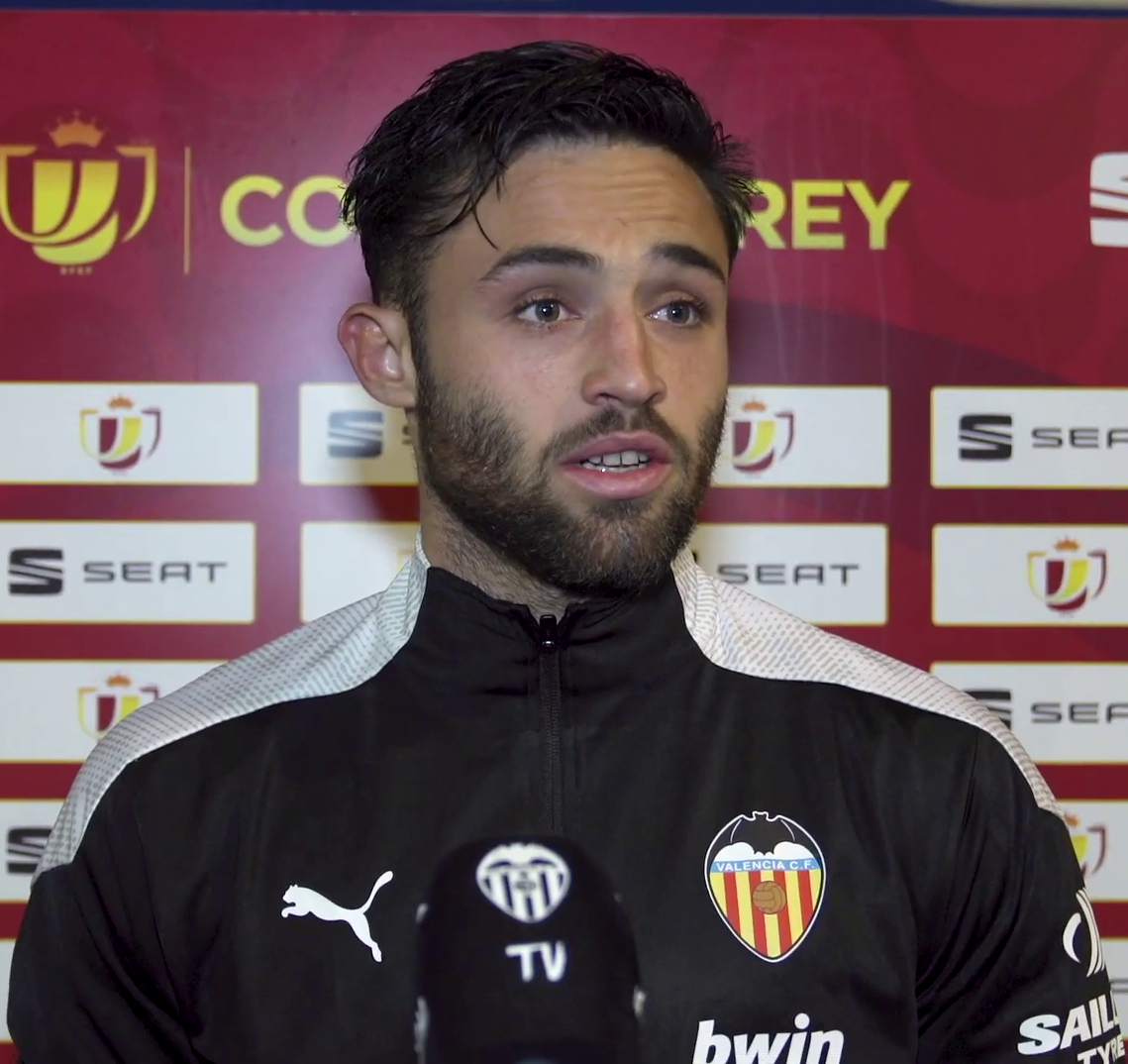
- Sibille with Valencia in 2021

Personal information
- Full name: Kevin Leonel Sibille
- Date of birth: 15 September 1998 (age 28)
- Place of birth: Buenos Aires, Argentina
- Height: 1.83 m (6 ft 0 in)
- Position: Centre-back

Team information
- Current team: Bhayangkara Presisi
- Number: 6

Youth career
- –2015: River Plate

Senior career*
Years	Team	Apps	(Gls)
2015–2020	River Plate	4	(0)
2020–2022	Valencia B	17	(0)
2021–2022	→ Castellón (loan)	33	(0)
2022–2023	Atlético Baleares	33	(0)
2023–2025	Ponferradina	58	(6)
2025–2026	East Bengal	7	(0)
2026–	Bhayangkara Presisi	8	(0)
- * Club domestic league appearances and goals as of 22:30, 19 September 2026 (UTC)

Kevin Leonel Sibille (born 15 September 1998) is an Argentine professional footballer who plays as a defender for Super League club Bhayangkara Presisi.

== Career ==
Sibille started off his career with River Plate. He was an unused substitute three times between 2015 and 2017, eventually making his first professional appearance during the 2017–18 Argentine Primera División season as River Plate lost 4–0 to Talleres; in the years prior to his first-team debut, Sibille featured for the club's U20 team - notably at the 2016 U-20 Copa Libertadores in Paraguay. He appeared three more times for them, before departing at the end of his contract in June 2020. On 6 October, Sibille moved to Spain with Valencia B. He made his Segunda División B debut on 17 October against Atzeneta.

In January 2021, after six appearances for their reserves, Sibille was promoted into Valencia's first-team for a Copa del Rey second round match away to Yeclano of Segunda División B. He was subsequently selected to start by manager Javi Gracia, with the defender playing the full duration of a 4–1 win on 7 January.

On 24 July 2021, Sibille was loaned to Primera División RFEF side CD Castellón for one year. On 18 June of the following year, he moved to fellow third-tier side CD Atlético Baleares on a two-year contract.

== Career statistics ==
As of 14 February 2021

Appearances and goals by club, season and competition
Club	Season	League			National cup (Note: Includes Copa del Rey)		League cup		Continental		Other		Total	
Club	Season	Division	Apps	Goals	Apps	Goals	Apps	Goals	Apps	Goals	Apps	Goals	Apps	Goals
River Plate	2015	Primera División	0	0	0	0	—		0	0	0	0	0	0
River Plate	2016	Primera División	0	0	0	0	—		0	0	0	0	0	0
River Plate	2016–17	Primera División	0	0	0	0	—		0	0	0	0	0	0
River Plate	2017–18	Primera División	1	0	0	0	—		0	0	0	0	1	0
River Plate	2018–19	Primera División	3	0	0	0	0	0	0	0	0	0	3	0
River Plate	2019–20	Primera División	0	0	0	0	0	0	0	0	0	0	0	0
River Plate	Total		4	0	0	0	0	0	0	0	0	0	4	0
Valencia B	2020–21	Segunda División B	8	0	—		—		—		0	0	8	0
Valencia	2020–21	La Liga	0	0	1	0	—		—		0	0	1	0
Career total			12	0	1	0	0	0	0	0	0	0	13	0

== Honours ==
East Bengal

- Indian Super League: 2025–26
