= 2026–27 Punjab FC season =

Punjab FC
2026–27 season
- Owner: RoundGlass Sports Pvt. Ltd.
- Head coach: Pavlos Dermitzakis
- Stadium: Jawaharlal Nehru Stadium, Delhi
- Indian Super League: 5th
- IFA Shield: Semi-finals
- Super Cup: TBP
- Punjab State Super League: Champions
- Oil India Gold Cup: Champions
- Highest home attendance: 4,085
- Average home league attendance: 3,375
- Biggest win: Calcutta Customs 0–7 Punjab (17 September 2026)
- Biggest defeat: Mohun Bagan SG 2–1 Punjab (31 October 2026)
| Home colours | Away colours | Third colours |
- All statistics correct as of 9 November 2026.

The 2026–27 season is the seventh season in Punjab FC's existence, their fourth consecutive season in the Indian Super League, and sixth overall season in the topflight of Indian football. In addition to the 2026–27 Indian Super League, the club is expected to participate in the national cup competition but will not participate in the 2026 Durand Cup.

== Background ==
The club finished 6th in the 2025–26 season, its best finish in the Indian Super League. However, the club's technical director since 2020, Nikolaos Topoliatis, departed Punjab in the winter to return to Olympiacos in Greece.

In a surprise move on 25 June, head coach Panagiotis Dilmperis left the club to join Mohun Bagan Super Giant. Dilmperis's staff, including assistant head coach Katsaras, also departed to the Kolkata giants.

On 13 July, Punjab FC announced the appointment of Pavlos Dermitzakis as the new head coach. He became the third consecutive Greek manager at the club after Staikos Vergetis and Panos Dilberis.

Punjab FC decided not to participate in the 2026 Durand Cup in July–August.

== Transfers ==
=== Transfers in ===
| Date | Position | Player | Previous club | Transfer fee | Ref |
|---|---|---|---|---|---|
| 30 June 2026 | CM | Mohammad Inam | Real Kashmir | | |
| 6 July 2026 | RW | (Spain) Alfred Planas | Inter Kashi | Free | |
| 26 July 2026 | CB | Nishchal Chandan | Inter Kashi | | |
| 28 July 2026 | LW | Gurkirat Singh | Chennaiyin FC | | |
| 22 August 2026 | CF | (Cameroon) Raphaël Messi Bouli | Jamshedpur FC | | |
| 26 August 2026 | CB | (Cameroon) Patrick Gérard Bahanack | (Cyprus) Ethnikos Achna FC | Free | |
| 8 September 2026 | LW | (Brazil) Diego Raposo | (Bulgaria) FC Lokomotiv Sofia | Free | |

=== Transfers out ===
| Date. | Position | Player | Outgoing club | Transfer Fee | Ref |
|---|---|---|---|---|---|
| 11 June 2026 | MF/CB | (Bosnia and Herzegovina) Samir Zeljkovic | Mohun Bagan Super Giant | None | |
| 18 June 2026 | CB | Pramveer Singh | NorthEast United | | |
| 26 June 2026 | CF | (Nigeria) Bede Osuji | (Slovenia) NK Aluminij | None | |
| 9 July 2026 | AM | (Spain) Dani Ramírez | East Bengal | None | |
| 17 July 2026 | ST | (Nigeria) Effiong Nsungusi | East Bengal | | |
| 31 July 2026 | CB | (Brazil) Pablo Santos | Free agent | | |

== Squad ==
=== Current players ===
| No. | Name | Nat. | Pos. | Age | Contract Ends |
Goalkeepers
| 1 | Arshdeep Singh | (India) | GK | 28 | 2028 |
| 25 | Aryaman Bengani | (India) | GK | 20 | 2027 |
| 37 | Ayush Deshwal | (India) | GK | 21 | 2028 |
| 78 | Muheet Shabir | (India) | GK | 24 | 2027 |
Defenders
| 30 | Thoungamba Singh | (India) | CB | 18 | 2027 |
| 3 | Bijoy Varghese | (India) | CB | 26 | 2028 |
| 74 | Suresh Meitei | (India) | CB | 32 | 2027 |
| 2 | Muhammad Uvais | (India) | LB | 28 | 2028 |
| 27 | Karish Soram | (India) | CB | 18 | 2027 |
| 5 | Patrick Gérard Bahanack | (Cameroon) | CB | 29 | 2027 |
| 44 | Mohammed Sohel Khan | (India) | RB | 20 | 2027 |
| 66 | Ngarin Shaiza | (India) | LB | 19 | 2027 |
Midfielders
| 4 | Nikhil Prabhu | (India) | DM | 25 | 2027 |
| 6 | Ricky Shabong | (India) | DM | 23 | 2027 |
| 19 | Manglenthang Kipgen | (India) | MF | 21 | 2028 |
| 8 | Mohammad Inam | (India) | CM | 25 | 2028 |
| 12 | Khaiminthang Lhungdim | (India) | RM | 26 | 2029 |
| 31 | Leon Augustine | (India) | RM | 27 | 2027 |
| 11 | Princeton Rebello | (India) | AM | 27 | 2027 |
| 21 | Singamayum Shami | (India) | AM | 19 | 2029 |
| 18 | Bishu Sharma | (India) | MF | 20 | 2028 |
| 22 | Rishikanta Meitei | (India) | MF | 19 | 2027 |
| 8 | Mohammad Inam | (India) | CM | 25 | 2028 |
Forwards
| 91 | Gurkirat Singh | (India) | LW | 23 | 2028 |
| 23 | Bikash Singh Sagolsem | (India) | LW | 25 | 2028 |
| 11 | Diego Raposo | (Brazil) | LW | 29 | 2027 |
| 10 | Alfred Planas | (Spain) | RW | 30 | 2027 |
| 7 | Ninthoi Meetei | (India) | RW | 25 | 2027 |
| 17 | Muhammad Suhail F | (India) | CF | 19 | 2029 |
| 14 | Vishal Yadav | (India) | CF | 18 | 2027 |
| 28 | Raphaël Messi Bouli | (Cameroon) | CF | 34 | 2027 |
| 99 | Konsam Sanathoi Singh | (India) | RW | 19 | 2029 |

=== Current technical staff ===
| Position | Name |
|---|---|
| Head coach | (Greece) Pavlos Dermitzakis |
| Assistant coach | (Greece) Georgios Angelidis |
| Assistant coach | (India) Sankarlal Chakraborty |
| Strength & Conditioning Coach | (Greece) Christos Vorgiatzidis |
| Team Manager | (India) Kaustuv Kashyap |

== Competitions ==
=== Overall record ===
| Competition | First match | Last match | Starting round | Final position | Record | | | | | | | |
| Competition | First match | Last match | Starting round | Final position | Pld | W | D | L | GF | GA | GD | Win % |
|---|---|---|---|---|---|---|---|---|---|---|---|---|
| Indian Super League | 14 October 2026 | | | | 5 | 2 | 2 | 1 | 8 | 7 | +1 | 40.00 |
| Super Cup | | | Group Stage | | 0 | 0 | 0 | 0 | 0 | 0 | +0 | — |
| IFA Shield | 27 September 2026 | 4 October 2026 | Group Stage | Semi Finals | 3 | 2 | 1 | 0 | 8 | 0 | +8 | 66.67 |
| Punjab State Super League (Note: Punjab fielded mostly their Reserve team for the tournament, with Praveen Kumar taking charge as the head coach.) | 10 August 2026 | TBD | Group Stage | Champions | 13 | 8 | 2 | 3 | 25 | 15 | +10 | 61.54 |
| Oil India Gold Cup | 27 September 2026 | 3 October 2026 | Quarterfinals | Champions | 3 | 2 | 1 | 0 | 8 | 5 | +3 | 66.67 |
| Total | | | | | 24 | 14 | 6 | 4 | 49 | 27 | +22 | 58.33 |

Last updated: 21 November 2026
Source: Soccerway

=== IFA Shield ===
Punjab participated in the 2026 IFA Shield and were placed in Group B alongside Calcutta Customs and East Bengal and would play their group stage matches at Kolkata. This was their first ever appearance in the tournament. Punjab started their campaign with a thumping 7–0 win against Calcutta Customs with a hattrick from Messi Bouli along with goals from Konsam Sanathoi Singh, Bishu Sharma, Alfred Planas and Gurkirat Singh. The win assured Punjab of a spot in the semi-finals played on 4 October 2026 at Kishore Bharati Krirangan against Mohun Bagan SG. The match ended 0–0 after 120 minutes of play and headed towards penalties where Punjab lost, courtesy 2 penalty saves by Vishal Kaith.

==== Table ====
| Pos | Team | Pld | W | D | L | GF | GA | GD | Pts | Qualification | PFC | EAB | CCC |
|---|---|---|---|---|---|---|---|---|---|---|---|---|---|
| 1 | Punjab | 2 | 2 | 0 | 0 | 8 | 0 | +8 | 6 | Advance to the Semi-Final | | 1–0 | 7–0 |
| 2 | East Bengal (H) | 2 | 1 | 0 | 1 | 3 | 2 | +1 | 3 | Advance to the Semi-Final | | | 3–1 |
| 3 | Calcutta Customs | 2 | 0 | 0 | 2 | 1 | 10 | −9 | 0 | | | | |

Source: IFA
Legend: Blue = home team win; Yellow = draw; Red = away team win.
Rules for classification: Group stage tiebreakers
(H) Hosts

Semi-finals
4 October – Kishore Bharati
Mohun Bagan (p) | 0 (4)
Punjab | 0 (3)
5 October – Kishore Bharati
East Bengal | 7
NorthEast United | 2

Final
8 October – Yuba Bharati
Mohun Bagan | 1
East Bengal | 0

==== Matches ====
Win Draw Loss Void

| 27 September 2026 Group stage | Calcutta Customs | 0–7 | Punjab | Barasat |
| 14:30 IST | | Report; PDF Report | Messi Bouli 6' 8' 45'; Sanathoi 20'; Bishu 30'; Planas 43'; Gurkirat 62' | Stadium: Barasat Stadium; Attendance: 1775; Referee: Sarnendu Bagchi; Man of the Match: Raphaël Messi Bouli (Punjab) |

| 30 September 2026 Group stage | East Bengal | 0–1 | Punjab | Kolkata |
| 14:30 IST | | Report; PDF Report | Raposo 41' | Stadium: East Bengal Ground; Attendance: 1,234; Referee: Pratik Mondal; Man of the Match: Diego Raposo (Punjab) |

| 4 October 2026 Semi final | Mohun Bagan SG | 0–0 (a.e.t.) (4–3 p) | Punjab | Kolkata |
| 17:00 IST | | Report; PDF Report | | Stadium: Kishore Bharati Krirangan; Attendance: 7,067; Referee: Bimalendu Mondal; Man of the Match: Vishal Kaith (Mohun Bagan SG) |
| | Penalties |
| | Bheke (penalty scored); Bose (penalty scored); Alberto (penalty scored); Dražić (penalty missed); Miguel (penalty scored) | | Messi Bouli (penalty scored); Arshvir (penalty scored); Ngarin (penalty missed); Vishal (penalty missed); Rishikanta (penalty scored) |

=== Indian Super League ===
Punjab participated in the 2026 Indian Super League and began their league journey with a home match against Odisha at Jawaharlal Nehru Stadium, Delhi on 14 October with a 2–1 win against Odisha with Messi Bouli scoring within 39 seconds and again at the dying seconds of the match to ensure a winning start to Punjab's league journey. Punjab faced Mumbai City on 19 October at Delhi as the match ended in a 1–1 draw with a late goal from Gurkirat Singh which salvaged a point for Punjab.

Punjab's league journey continued as they had an uphill task of playing 7 away matches in a row. They faced Churchill Brothers at Fatorda where they won 2–3 in a thrilling encounter as Sanathoi scored in 90+5 minutes to bag all 3 points for Punjab. Punjab travelled to Kolkata for their next match against Mohun Bagan SG where Planas scored in within 3 minutes, which didn't prove to be enough as Punjab lost 2–1.

==== Table ====
| Pos | Team | Pld | W | D | L | GF | GA | GD | Pts | Qualification |
|---|---|---|---|---|---|---|---|---|---|---|
| 3 | NorthEast United | 5 | 3 | 2 | 0 | 8 | 2 | +6 | 11 | Qualification for the knockouts |
| 4 | Delhi | 6 | 2 | 2 | 2 | 12 | 10 | +2 | 8 | Qualification for the knockouts |
| 5 | Punjab | 5 | 2 | 2 | 1 | 8 | 7 | +1 | 8 | Qualification for the knockouts |
| 6 | East Bengal | 4 | 2 | 1 | 1 | 14 | 8 | +6 | 7 | Qualification for the knockouts |
| 7 | Chennaiyin | 6 | 1 | 3 | 2 | 7 | 8 | −1 | 6 | |

Updated to match(es) played on 20 November 2026. Source: Indian Super League
Rules for classification: 1) points; 2) goal difference; 3) number of goals scored; 4) head-to-head points; 5) head-to-head goal difference; 6) head-to-head goals scored; 7) fair play ranking; 8) drawing of lots
(Note: Head-to-head record is used only after all the matches between the teams in question have been played).

==== Result summary ====
| Overall | | | | | | | | Home | | | | | | Away | | | | | |
| Pld | W | D | L | GF | GA | GD | Pts | W | D | L | GF | GA | GD | W | D | L | GF | GA | GD |
|---|---|---|---|---|---|---|---|---|---|---|---|---|---|---|---|---|---|---|---|
| 5 | 2 | 2 | 1 | 8 | 7 | +1 | 8 | 1 | 1 | 0 | 3 | 2 | +1 | 1 | 1 | 1 | 5 | 5 | 0 |

==== Results by match ====
| Match | 1 | 2 | 3 | 4 | 5 | 6 | 7 | 8 | 9 | 10 | 11 | 12 |
|---|---|---|---|---|---|---|---|---|---|---|---|---|
| Ground | H | H | A | A | A | A | A | A | A | H | A | H |
| Result | W | D | W | L | D | | | | | | | |
| Position | 3 | 3 | 2 | 4 | 5 | | | | | | | |

Updated to match(es) played on 21 November 2026. Source: indiansuperleague.com
A = Away; H = Home; W = Win; D = Draw; L = Loss

==== Matches ====
Win Draw Loss Void

| 14 October 2026 1 | Punjab | 2–1 | Odisha | New Delhi |
| 19:30 IST | Messi Bouli 1' (yellow card) 50' (goal) 90+5'; Inam (yellow card) 90+2' | Report; PDF Report | Zuidika (yellow card) 5'; Thoiba 15' | Stadium: Jawaharlal Nehru Stadium; Attendance: 2,665; Referee: Jatinder Singh; Man of the Match: Raphaël Messi Bouli (Punjab) |

| 19 October 2026 2 | Punjab | 1–1 | Mumbai City | New Delhi |
| 19:30 IST | Gurkirat 90' | Report; PDF Report | Leandro 65' (pen.) | Stadium: Jawaharlal Nehru Stadium; Attendance: 4,085; Referee: Surojit Das; Man of the Match: Lazar Ćirković (Mumbai) |

| 25 October 2026 3 | Churchill Brothers | 2–3 | Punjab | Fatorda |
| 17:00 IST | Okoli (yellow card) 0'; Gutiérrez 37' 45+2'; Dias (yellow card) 45+2'; Gaonkar (yellow card) 71' | Report; PDF Report | Messi Bouli 13' (pen.) (yellow card) 76'; Planas 40'; Lhungdim (yellow card) 88'; Sanathoi 90+5' (yellow card) 90+5' | Stadium: Jawaharlal Nehru Stadium; Attendance: 5,109; Referee: Venkatesh R Man of the Match: Konsam Sanathoi Singh (Punjab) |

| 31 October 2026 4 | Mohun Bagan SG | 2–1 | Punjab | Kolkata |
| 19:30 IST | Manvir (yellow card) 12'; Erwin 18'; Dražić 42'; Tangri (yellow card) 80'; Alberto (yellow card) 90+6' | Report; PDF Report | Messi Bouli (yellow card) 1'; Planas 3'; Bijoy (yellow card) 71'; Lhungdim (yellow card) 76'; Malsa (yellow card) 90+7' | Stadium: Vivekananda Yuba Bharati Krirangan; Attendance: 18,005; Referee: Crystal John; Man of the Match: Lee Erwin (Mohun Bagan SG) |

| 21 November 2026 5 | Chennaiyin | 1–1 | Punjab | Chennai |
| 17:00 IST | Prabhu 13' (o.g.); Nikola (yellow card) 23' | Report; PDF Report | Prabhu (yellow card) 10'; Messi Bouli 41' (yellow card) 78' | Stadium: Jawaharlal Nehru Stadium; Attendance: 5,919; Referee: Tejas Visvasrao Nagvenkar; Man of the Match: Raphaël Messi Bouli (Punjab) |

| 30 November 2026 6 | NorthEast United | – | Punjab | Guwahati |
| 19:30 IST | | Report | | Stadium: Indira Gandhi Athletic Stadium |

| 4 December 2026 7 | East Bengal | – | Punjab | Kolkata |
| 19:30 IST | | Report | | Stadium: Vivekananda Yuba Bharati Krirangan |

| 14 December 2026 8 | Kerala Blasters | – | Punjab | Kochi |
| 19:30 IST | | Report | | Stadium: Jawaharlal Nehru Stadium |

| 22 December 2026 9 | Bengaluru | – | Punjab | Bengaluru |
| 17:00 IST | | Report | | Stadium: Sree Kanteerava Stadium |

| 7 January 2027 10 | Punjab | – | Inter Kashi | New Delhi |
| 19:30 IST | | Report | | Stadium: Jawaharlal Nehru Stadium |

| 10 January 2027 11 | Delhi | – | Punjab | New Delhi |
| 19:30 IST | | Report | | Stadium: Jawaharlal Nehru Stadium |

| 15 January 2027 12 | Punjab | – | Goa | New Delhi |
| 17:00 IST | | Report | | Stadium: Jawaharlal Nehru Stadium |

| 22 January 2027 13 | Punjab | – | NorthEast United | New Delhi |
| 19:30 IST | | | | Stadium: Jawaharlal Nehru Stadium |

| 5 February 2027 14 | Punjab | – | East Bengal | New Delhi |
| 17:00 IST | | | | Stadium: Jawaharlal Nehru Stadium |

| 20 February 2027 15 | Punjab | – | Delhi | New Delhi |
| 19:30 IST | | | | Stadium: Jawaharlal Nehru Stadium |

| 27 February 2027 16 | Odisha | – | Punjab | Bhubaneswar |
| 17:00 IST | | | | Stadium: Kalinga Stadium |

| 3 March 2027 17 | Punjab | – | Kerala Blasters | New Delhi |
| 19:30 IST | | | | Stadium: Jawaharlal Nehru Stadium |

| 7 March 2027 18 | Punjab | – | Churchill Brothers | New Delhi |
| 17:00 IST | | | | Stadium: Jawaharlal Nehru Stadium |

| 12 March 2027 19 | Inter Kashi | – | Punjab | Pune |
| 19:30 IST | | | | Stadium: Balewadi Stadium |

| 16 March 2027 20 | Punjab | – | Chennaiyin | New Delhi |
| 19:30 IST | | | | Stadium: Jawaharlal Nehru Stadium |

| 20 March 2027 21 | Mumbai City | – | Punjab | Mumbai |
| 19:30 IST |

| 4 April 2027 22 | Punjab | – | Mohun Bagan | New Delhi |
| 17:00 IST | | | | Stadium: Jawaharlal Nehru Stadium |

| 9 April 2027 23 | Punjab | – | Bengaluru | New Delhi |
| 19:30 IST | | | | Stadium: Jawaharlal Nehru Stadium |

=== Oil India Gold Cup ===
==== Summary ====
Punjab FC sent mostly a reserve squad to take part in the 9th edition of the Oil India Gold Cup in Duliajan, Assam. The team started in the quarter-finals and won the competition by beating Asufii FC, Shillong Lajong and Oil India FC.

==== Bracket ====
Preliminary Round; 21–22 September 2026
ASEB SC | 0
ASUFII FA | 2
Lenruol FC | 4
NRL FA | 3

Pre-quarterfinals; 23–25 September 2026
Sudeva Delhi | 3
Naharkatia SA | 1
CISF FT | 1(2)
ASUFII FA | 1(4)
Oil India FC | 5
Duliajan FA | 1
NorthEast United II | 5
Lenruol FC | 1

Quarterfinals; 26–29 September 2026
Shillong Lajong | 1
Sudeva Delhi | 0
Punjab FC II | 3
ASUFII FA | 1
Kidderpore | 0
Oil India | 2
SC Delhi | 3
NorthEast United II | 1

Semifinals; 30 September-1 October 2026
Shillong Lajong | 3
Punjab FC II | 4
Oil India | 3
SC Delhi | 0

Final; 3 October 2026
Punjab FC II | 1(4)
Oil India | 1(2)

==== Matches ====
| 27 September 2026 Quarter-finals | Punjab | 3–1 | ASUFII FA | Duliajan |
| 19:00 IST | Benjamin Lallawmawma 28' 48'; Omang Dodum 34'; Usham Thoungamba Singh (yellow card) 56'; Ekmeet Singh (yellow card) 86' | Report | Johny Kom 37'; Wangkheirakpam John Singh (yellow card) 56'; Waikhom Arunkumar Singh (yellow card) 65' | Stadium: Nehru Maidan; Man of the Match: Aniket Yadav (Punjab) |

| 30 September 2026 Semi-finals | Punjab | 4–3 | Shillong Lajong | Duliajan |
| 18:00 IST | Omang Dodum 8' 30' 34' 65'; Ekmeet Singh (yellow card) 36'; Suraj Murmu (yellow card) 38' | Report; PDF Report | Figo Syndai 45+1'; Gladdy Nelcen Kharbuli 45+2'; Everbrightson Sana Mylliempdah 61'; Lamlallian (yellow card) 83' | Stadium: Nehru Maidan; Attendance: 10,000; Referee: Debujeet Singh Yadav; Man of the Match: Omang Dodum (Punjab) |

| 3 October 2026 Final | Punjab | 1–1 (a.e.t.) (4–2 p) | Oil India | Duliajan |
| 18:00 IST | Boby Singh Yendrembam 62'; Aniket Yadav (yellow card) 113' | Report | Akrang Narzary 33'; Dipu Gohain (yellow card) 68'; Sudem Wary (yellow card) 81' | Stadium: Nehru Maidan; Referee: Manbeer Singh Harwinder Singh Kalyan; Man of the Match: Singamayum Shami (Punjab) |
| | Penalties |
| | Aniket Yadav (penalty missed); Rishikanta (penalty scored); Subham Gurung (penalty scored); Shami Singamayum (penalty scored); Jaskaran Dub (penalty scored) | | (penalty scored) Rituraj Mohan; (penalty missed) Tupu Brahma; (penalty missed) Joydeep Gogoi; (penalty scored) Timothi Narzary |
Note: Jaskaran Dub replaced goalkeeper Aryaman Bengani for the penalty shootout.

=== Punjab State Super League ===
==== Summary ====
Punjab participated in the 40th season of the 2026–27 Punjab State Super Football League as the defending champions. They faced GHG Khalsa College FC in their opening match of the season. Punjab fielded their reserve team for the tournament, with Praveen Kumar taking charge as the head coach.

==== Table ====
| Pos | Team | Pld | W | D | L | GF | GA | GD | Pts | Qualification | RGP | IFC | GKC | RCF | SPS | DFC | NFC | KSC |
|---|---|---|---|---|---|---|---|---|---|---|---|---|---|---|---|---|---|---|
| 1 | Punjab FC | 13 | 8 | 2 | 3 | 25 | 15 | +10 | 26 | Champions | | 3–0 | 1–0 | 2–1 | 4–1 | 4–2 | 3–1 | 1–1 |
| 2 | International FC | 13 | 6 | 4 | 3 | 16 | 16 | 0 | 22 | | 0–0 | | | 0–2 | 2–1 | 1–1 | 0–2 | 1–0 |
| 3 | GHG Khalsa College FC | 13 | 6 | 3 | 4 | 24 | 22 | +2 | 21 | | 3–1 | 2–2 | | 3–3 | 0–5 | 2–0 | 2–2 | 2–0 |
| 4 | RCF FC | 13 | 5 | 3 | 5 | 16 | 19 | −3 | 18 | | | 0–2 | 0–2 | | 0–3 | 1–1 | 1–0 | 0–0 |
| 5 | Sher-e-Punjab SC | 13 | 5 | 2 | 6 | 23 | 17 | +6 | 17 | | 2–0 | 2–3 | 2–1 | 3–0 | | 2–3 | 0–0 | 0–1 |
| 6 | Dalbir FA | 13 | 4 | 4 | 5 | 24 | 28 | −4 | 16 | | 3–2 | 1–2 | 3–2 | 2–3 | 2–2 | | 0–0 | |
| 7 | Namdhari FC | 13 | 3 | 4 | 6 | 18 | 24 | −6 | 13 | | 1–3 | 1–1 | 1–2 | 1–4 | | 4–2 | | 4–3 |
| 8 | Kehar SC | 13 | 3 | 2 | 8 | 15 | 20 | −5 | 11 | Relegation (Note: Relegation to Punjab State 2nd Division) | 0–1 | 1–2 | 2–3 | 0–1 | 1–0 | 3–4 | 3–1 | |

Updated to match(es) played on 12 November 2026. Source: The Away End
Legend: Blue = home team win; Yellow = draw; Red = away team win.
Rules for classification: 1) points; 2) head-to-head points; 3) head-to-head goal difference; 4) head-to-head goals scored; 5) goal difference; 6) number of goals scored; 7) fair play ranking; 8) drawing of lots

==== Matches ====
Win Draw Loss Void

| 10 August 2026 1 | Punjab | 1–0 | GHG Khalsa College | Mohali |
| 16:30 IST | Ekmeet Singh 39' | Report; PDF Report | | Stadium: Roundglass Sports Academy; Attendance: 145; Referee: Satwant Singh; Man of the Match: Ekmeet Singh (Punjab) |

| 17 August 2026 2 | Kehar SC | 0–1 | Punjab | Chandigarh |
| 16:30 IST | | Report; PDF Report | Muhammed Shahil CK 90' | Stadium: DAV College Ground; Attendance: 100; Referee: Harkomal Singh Duhra; Man of the Match: Muhammed Shahil CK (Punjab) |

| 24 August 2026 3 | Punjab | 2–1 | RCF | Mohali |
| 16:30 IST | Jagdish Singh 15'; James Kumar 55' | Report; PDF Report | Gurveer Singh 17' | Stadium: Roundglass Sports Academy; Attendance: 170; Referee: Satwant Singh; Man of the Match: Satpal (Punjab) |

| 31 August 2026 4 | Dalbir FA | 3–2 | Punjab | Patiala |
| 16:30 IST | Akash Masih 44'; Amit Singh Chauhan 57'; Jagdish Singh 62' (o.g.) | Report; PDF Report | James Kumar 41'; Sameer 74' | Stadium: Punjabi University; Attendance: 80; Referee: Sandeep Singh Saraon; Man of the Match: Ekmeet Singh (Punjab) |

| 7 September 2026 5 | Sher-e-Punjab | 2–0 | Punjab | Rupnagar |
| 16:00 IST | Karan Singh 41'; Malkit 78' | Report; PDF Report | | Stadium: Sher-e-Punjab Stadium; Attendance: 210; Referee: Satwant Singh; Man of the Match: Ekmeet Singh (Punjab) |

| 14 September 2026 6 | Punjab | 3–0 | International FC | Mohali |
| 16:00 IST | James Kumar 2'; Jagdish Singh 14'; Ekmeet Singh 87' | Report; PDF Report | | Stadium: Roundglass Sports Academy; Attendance: 200; Referee: Harkomal Singh Duhra; Man of the Match: Arshvir Singh (Punjab) |

| 21 September 2026 7 | Punjab | 3–1 | Namdhari | Mohali |
| 16:00 IST | Satpal 13'; James Kumar 65'; Subham Gurung 79' | Report; PDF Report | Karan Kumar Sharma 89' | Stadium: Roundglass Sports Academy; Attendance: 130; Referee: Satwant Singh; Man of the Match: Arshvir Singh (Punjab) |

| 5 October 2026 8 | Punjab | 1–1 | Kehar SC | Mohali |
| 16:00 IST | Sameer 61' | Report; PDF Report | Darshanbir Singh 48' | Stadium: Roundglass Sports Academy; Attendance: 100; Referee: Satwant Singh; Man of the Match: Manas Sharma (Kehar) |

| 16 October 2026 9 | Punjab | 4–2 | Dalbir FA | Mohali |
| 15:30 IST | Benjamin Lallawmawma 38'; Tourangbam Zaithleen Singh 45'; Satpal 57', 78' | Report; PDF Report | Akash Masih 30'; Tanveer Singh 86' (pen.) | Stadium: Roundglass Sports Academy; Attendance: 50; Referee: Satwant Singh; Man of the Match: Satpal (Punjab) |

| 27 October 2026 10 | International FC | 0–0 | Punjab | Phagwara |
| 15:00 IST | | Report; PDF Report | | Stadium: Shri Hargobind Sahib Stadium; Attendance: 100; Referee: Satwant Singh |

| 31 October 2026 11 | GHG Khalsa College | 3–1 | Punjab | Ludhiana |
| 16:00 IST | Ekmeet Singh 5' (o.g.); Satnam Singh 49'; Karan Singh Chumber 74' | Report; PDF Report | Harpreet Singh 76'; Mohammad Sahil (red card) 89' | Stadium: GHG Khalsa College Ground; Attendance: 200; Referee: Sandeep Singh Saraon; Man of the Match: Harjot Singh (GHG Khalsa College) |

| 6 November 2026 12 | Namdhari | 1–3 | Punjab | Sri Bhaini Sahib |
| 15:00 IST | Manav Singh 51' (o.g.) | Report; PDF Report | Usham Thoungamba Singh 50'; Sameer 76'; Tourangbam Zaithleen Singh 83' | Stadium: Namdhari Sports Complex; Attendance: 260; Referee: Sukhchain Singh Rai |

| 9 November 2026 13 | Punjab | 4–1 | Sher-e-Punjab | Mohali |
| 15:00 IST | Sameer 26', 51'; Benjamin Lallawmawma 45+3'; Satpal 89' | Report; PDF Report | Simranjit Singh 32' | Stadium: Roundglass Sports Academy; Attendance: 125; Referee: Satwant Singh; Man of the Match: Sameer (Punjab) |

== Statistics ==
=== Senior squad appearances and goals ===
As of 21 November 2026

==== All competitions ====
| No. | Pos | Nat | Player | Total | | Indian Super League | | IFA Shield | | Super Cup | |
| No. | Pos | Nat | Player | Apps | Goals | Apps | Goals | Apps | Goals | Apps | Goals |
Goalkeepers
| 1 | GK | (India) IND | Arshdeep Singh | 8 | 0 | 5 | 0 | 3 | 0 | 0 | 0 |
| 37 | GK | (India) IND | Ayush Deshwal | 0 | 0 | 0 | 0 | 0 | 0 | 0 | 0 |
| 78 | GK | (India) IND | Muheet Shabir | 1 | 0 | 0 | 0 | 1 | 0 | 0 | 0 |
Defenders
| 2 | DF | (India) IND | Muhammad Uvais | 8 | 0 | 5 | 0 | 3 | 0 | 0 | 0 |
| 3 | DF | (India) IND | Bijoy Varghese | 5 | 0 | 5 | 0 | 0 | 0 | 0 | 0 |
| 5 | DF | (Cameroon) CMR | Patrick Bahanack | 3 | 0 | 1 | 0 | 2 | 0 | 0 | 0 |
| 12 | DF | (India) IND | Khaiminthang Lhungdim | 8 | 0 | 5 | 0 | 3 | 0 | 0 | 0 |
| 27 | DF | (India) IND | Karish Soram | 3 | 0 | 2 | 0 | 1 | 0 | 0 | 0 |
| 44 | DF | (India) IND | Mohammed Sohel Khan | 3 | 0 | 0 | 0 | 3 | 0 | 0 | 0 |
| 66 | DF | (India) IND | Ngarin Shaiza | 1 | 0 | 0 | 0 | 1 | 0 | 0 | 0 |
| 74 | DF | (India) IND | Suresh Meitei | 2 | 0 | 1 | 0 | 1 | 0 | 0 | 0 |
Midfielders
| 4 | DF | (India) IND | Nikhil Prabhu | 7 | 0 | 5 | 0 | 2 | 0 | 0 | 0 |
| 6 | MF | (India) IND | Ricky Shabong | 5 | 0 | 5 | 0 | 0 | 0 | 0 | 0 |
| 8 | MF | (India) IND | Mohammad Inam | 2 | 0 | 1 | 0 | 1 | 0 | 0 | 0 |
| 17 | MF | (India) IND | Muhammad Suhail | 8 | 0 | 5 | 0 | 3 | 0 | 0 | 0 |
| 18 | DF | (India) IND | Bishu Sharma | 7 | 1 | 4 | 0 | 3 | 1 | 0 | 0 |
| 19 | MF | (India) IND | Manglenthang Kipgen | 6 | 0 | 3 | 0 | 3 | 0 | 0 | 0 |
| 22 | MF | (India) IND | Rishikanta Meitei | 6 | 0 | 3 | 0 | 3 | 0 | 0 | 0 |
| 23 | MF | (India) IND | Bikash Singh Sagolsem | 0 | 0 | 0 | 0 | 0 | 0 | 0 | 0 |
| 31 | MF | (India) IND | Leon Augustine | 0 | 0 | 0 | 0 | 0 | 0 | 0 | 0 |
| 40 | MF | (India) IND | Arshvir Singh | 5 | 0 | 2 | 0 | 3 | 0 | 0 | 0 |
| 65 | MF | (Martinique) MTQ | Mickaël Malsa | 2 | 0 | 2 | 0 | 0 | 0 | 0 | 0 |
Forwards
| 10 | FW | (Spain) ESP | Alfred Planas | 7 | 3 | 4 | 2 | 3 | 1 | 0 | 0 |
| 11 | FW | (Brazil) BRA | Diego Raposo | 6 | 1 | 3 | 0 | 3 | 1 | 0 | 0 |
| 14 | FW | (India) IND | Vishal Yadav | 4 | 0 | 3 | 0 | 1 | 0 | 0 | 0 |
| 21 | FW | (India) IND | Shami Singamayum | 0 | 0 | 0 | 0 | 0 | 0 | 0 | 0 |
| 28 | FW | (Cameroon) CMR | Raphaël Messi Bouli | 8 | 7 | 5 | 4 | 3 | 3 | 0 | 0 |
| 91 | FW | (India) IND | Gurkirat Singh | 6 | 2 | 5 | 1 | 1 | 1 | 0 | 0 |
| 99 | FW | (India) IND | Konsam Sanathoi Singh | 5 | 2 | 4 | 1 | 1 | 1 | 0 | 0 |

=== Assists ===
| Rank | No. | Pos. | Name | Indian Super League | IFA Shield | Super Cup | Total |
|---|---|---|---|---|---|---|---|
| 1 | 28 | FW | Raphaël Messi Bouli | 1 | 3 | 0 | 4 |
| 2 | 19 | MF | Manglenthang Kipgen | 0 | 3 | 0 | 3 |
| 2 | 99 | FW | Konsam Sanathoi Singh | 2 | 1 | 0 | 3 |
| 4 | 22 | MF | Rishikanta Meitei | 0 | 1 | 0 | 1 |
| 4 | 2 | DF | Muhammad Uvais | 1 | 0 | 0 | 1 |
| 4 | 18 | DF | Bishu Sharma | 1 | 0 | 0 | 1 |

=== Yellow and Red Cards ===
| No. | Pos. | Name | Indian Super League | | | | IFA Shield | | | | Super Cup | | | |
| No. | Pos. | Name | Yellow card | (yellow card) (red card) | (yellow card) (yellow-red card) | Red card | Yellow card | (yellow card) (red card) | (yellow card) (yellow-red card) | Red card | Yellow card | (yellow card) (red card) | (yellow card) (yellow-red card) | Red card |
|---|---|---|---|---|---|---|---|---|---|---|---|---|---|---|
| 1 | GK | Arshdeep Singh | 0 | 0 | 0 | 0 | 2 | 0 | 0 | 0 | 0 | 0 | 0 | 0 |
| 3 | DF | Bijoy Varghese | 1 | 0 | 0 | 0 | 0 | 0 | 0 | 0 | 0 | 0 | 0 | 0 |
| 4 | MF | Nikhil Prabhu | 1 | 0 | 0 | 0 | 1 | 0 | 0 | 0 | 0 | 0 | 0 | 0 |
| 8 | MF | Mohammad Inam | 1 | 0 | 0 | 0 | 0 | 0 | 0 | 0 | 0 | 0 | 0 | 0 |
| 12 | MF | Khaiminthang Lhungdim | 2 | 0 | 0 | 0 | 1 | 0 | 0 | 0 | 0 | 0 | 0 | 0 |
| 28 | FW | Raphaël Messi Bouli | 4 | 0 | 0 | 0 | 0 | 0 | 0 | 0 | 0 | 0 | 0 | 0 |
| 65 | MF | Mickaël Malsa | 1 | 0 | 0 | 0 | 0 | 0 | 0 | 0 | 0 | 0 | 0 | 0 |
| 99 | FW | Konsam Sanathoi Singh | 1 | 0 | 0 | 0 | 0 | 0 | 0 | 0 | 0 | 0 | 0 | 0 |

=== Reserve Squad Appearances and Goals ===
| No. | Pos | Nat | Player | Total | | Punjab State Super League | | Oil India Gold Cup | | Others | |
| No. | Pos | Nat | Player | Apps | Goals | Apps | Goals | Apps | Goals | Apps | Goals |
Goalkeepers
| 1 | GK | (India) IND | Harpreet Singh | 9 | 1 | 9 | 1 | 0 | 0 | 0 | 0 |
| 21 | GK | (India) IND | Jaskaran Dub | 8 | 0 | 7 | 0 | 1 | 0 | 0 | 0 |
| 41 | GK | (India) IND | Aryaman Bengani | 3 | 0 | 0 | 0 | 3 | 0 | 0 | 0 |
Defenders
| 3 | DF | (India) IND | Priyoka Thounaojam | 1 | 0 | 1 | 0 | 0 | 0 | 0 | 0 |
| 4 | DF | (India) IND | Ekmeet Singh | 14 | 2 | 12 | 2 | 2 | 0 | 0 | 0 |
| 5 | DF | (India) IND | Jagdish Singh | 12 | 2 | 12 | 2 | 0 | 0 | 0 | 0 |
| 7 | FW | (India) IND | Satnam Singh | 11 | 0 | 8 | 0 | 3 | 0 | 0 | 0 |
| 13 | DF | (India) IND | Mohammad Sahil | 13 | 0 | 10 | 0 | 3 | 0 | 0 | 0 |
| | DF | (India) IND | Muhammed Shahil CK | 6 | 1 | 6 | 1 | 0 | 0 | 0 | 0 |
| | DF | (India) IND | Suraj Murmu | 3 | 0 | 0 | 0 | 3 | 0 | 0 | 0 |
| | DF | (India) IND | Arpan Das | 1 | 0 | 0 | 0 | 1 | 0 | 0 | 0 |
| | DF | (India) IND | Manav Singh | 4 | 0 | 4 | 0 | 0 | 0 | 0 | 0 |
Midfielders
| 6 | FW | (India) IND | Lovepreet Singh | 12 | 0 | 12 | 0 | 0 | 0 | 0 | 0 |
| 8 | MF | (India) IND | Arshvir Singh | 7 | 0 | 7 | 0 | 0 | 0 | 0 | 0 |
| 15 | MF | (India) IND | Sukhwinder Singh | 10 | 0 | 10 | 0 | 0 | 0 | 0 | 0 |
| 19 | MF | (India) IND | Sahil Thapa | 7 | 0 | 7 | 0 | 0 | 0 | 0 | 0 |
| 22 | MF | (India) IND | Zaithleen Singh Tourangbam | 13 | 2 | 10 | 2 | 3 | 0 | 0 | 0 |
| 24 | MF | (India) IND | Indermohan Singh | 7 | 0 | 7 | 0 | 0 | 0 | 0 | 0 |
| | MF | (India) IND | Subham Gurung | 10 | 1 | 8 | 1 | 2 | 0 | 0 | 0 |
| | MF | (India) IND | Aniket Yadav | 3 | 0 | 0 | 0 | 3 | 0 | 0 | 0 |
| | MF | (India) IND | Vikash Kusku | 2 | 0 | 0 | 0 | 2 | 0 | 0 | 0 |
| | MF | (India) IND | Thongram Rishikanta Singh | 2 | 0 | 0 | 0 | 2 | 0 | 0 | 0 |
Forwards
| | FW | (India) IND | Singamayum Shami | 3 | 0 | 0 | 0 | 3 | 0 | 0 | 0 |
| 9 | FW | (India) IND | Boby Singh Yendrembam | 5 | 1 | 2 | 0 | 3 | 1 | 0 | 0 |
| 11 | FW | (India) IND | Sameer | 7 | 4 | 7 | 4 | 0 | 0 | 0 | 0 |
| 12 | FW | (India) IND | Usham Singh Thoungamba | 10 | 1 | 7 | 1 | 3 | 0 | 0 | 0 |
| 16 | FW | (India) IND | Aris Khan | 2 | 0 | 2 | 0 | 0 | 0 | 0 | 0 |
| 18 | FW | (India) IND | Satpal | 12 | 4 | 12 | 4 | 0 | 0 | 0 | 0 |
| 19 | FW | (India) IND | Omang Dodum | 3 | 5 | 0 | 0 | 3 | 5 | 0 | 0 |
| 32 | FW | (India) IND | Benjamin Lallawmawma | 8 | 4 | 5 | 2 | 3 | 2 | 0 | 0 |
| 35 | FW | (India) IND | James Pandori | 15 | 4 | 12 | 4 | 3 | 0 | 0 | 0 |
| | FW | (India) IND | Gulraj Singh Buttar | 5 | 0 | 5 | 0 | 0 | 0 | 0 | 0 |
| | FW | (India) IND | Sayonba Moirangthem | 1 | 0 | 0 | 0 | 1 | 0 | 0 | 0 |
| | FW | (India) IND | Alicestar Thangkhiew | 1 | 0 | 0 | 0 | 1 | 0 | 0 | 0 |
