= 2025–26 Punjab FC season =

Indian football club season

Punjab FC
2025–26 season
- Owner: RoundGlass Sports Pvt. Ltd.
- Director of Football: (Greece) Nikolaos Topoliatis
- Head coach: (Greece) Panagiotis Dilmperis
- Stadium: Jawaharlal Nehru Stadium, Delhi
- Indian Super League: 5th
- Durand Cup: Group stage
- Super Cup: Semi-final
- Top goalscorer: League: All: Effiong Nsungusi
- Biggest win: 3–0 Gokulam Kerala (27 October 2025, Super Cup); 3–0 Mohammedan (1 November 2025, Super Cup)
- Biggest defeat: 1–3 East Bengal (4 December 2025, Super Cup)
Home colours	Away colours	Third colours

The 2025–26 season is the sixth season in Punjab FC's existence, the club's third consecutive season in Indian football's top-flight, and fifth overall. In addition to the league, the club will also take part in the 2025 Durand Cup and the 2025–26 Super Cup.

== Background ==
Punjab finished eighth in the 2024–25 Indian Super League. After the completion of the 2024–25 season, the club chose not to renew the contracts of any of their foreign players and opted for an overhaul in the foreign contingent. The club became active right after the end of the previous season, roping in Muhammad Uvais from Jamshedpur FC and Bijoy Varghese from Inter Kashi to strengthen the defence after departures of Abhishek Singh Tekcham, Melroy Assisi and the Croatian centre-back Ivan Novoselec. Punjab also renewed the contract of head coach Panagiotis Dilmperis for one more season keeping him at the club till the end of the 2026–27 season. The main highlight of the window for Punjab FC was the sale of fullback Abhishek Singh Tekcham to Mohun Bagan SG in a multi-crore rupees deal. Punjab bolstered their squad with the signing of 3 foreigners - Dani Ramírez, Samir Zeljković and Effiong Nsungusi. All three players have completed their medicals, penning one-year contracts after arriving on free transfers.

On 31 July, Punjab FC unveiled their new club crest, a face of a lion from front with the words "Punjab FC" below it. Nikhil Prabhu was appointed team captain before the start of the Durand Cup.

== Squad ==
=== First team ===
Note: Flags indicate national team as defined under FIFA eligibility rules; some limited exceptions apply. Players may hold more than one non-FIFA nationality.

No.	Pos.	Nation	Player
2	DF	IND	Muhammad Uvais
3	DF	IND	Bijoy Varghese
4	DF	IND	Nikhil Prabhu (captain)
6	MF	IND	Ricky Shabong
7	FW	IND	Ninthoinganba Meetei
8	MF	BIH	Samir Zeljković
9	FW	NGR	Effiong Nsungusi
10	MF	ESP	Dani Ramírez (Vice-captain)
11	MF	IND	Princeton Rebello
12	DF	IND	Khaiminthang Lhungdim (fourth captain)
13	GK	IND	Arshdeep Singh
14	FW	IND	Vishal Yadav
16	MF	IND	Vinit Rai
17	FW	IND	Muhammad Suhail F (third captain)
19	MF	IND	Manglenthang Kipgen

No.	Pos.	Nation	Player
20	FW	IND	Omang Dodum
21	FW	IND	Singamayum Shami
22	DF	IND	Manav Singh
23	MF	IND	Ashis Pradhan
24	FW	IND	Ranjeet Pandre
27	DF	BRA	Pablo Santos
28	MF	IND	Rishikanta Meitei
30	DF	IND	Usham Thoungamba Singh
31	MF	IND	Leon Augustine
33	FW	IND	Sanathoi Singh
35	DF	IND	Pramveer
37	GK	IND	Ayush Deshwal
40	FW	NGR	Bede Osuji
74	DF	IND	Suresh Meitei
78	GK	IND	Muheet Shabir
—	DF	IND	Rakesh Meitei Likmabam (on loan from Kerala Blasters)
—	FW	IND	Bikash Singh Sagolsem

== Transfers ==
=== In ===
Date	Player	Position	From	Transfer Fee	Ref.
15 June 2025	(India) Muhammad Uvais	DF	(India) Jamshedpur FC	Free transfer	
15 July 2025	(India) Bijoy Varghese	DF	(India) Inter Kashi FC	Free transfer	
6 October 2025	(Spain) Dani Ramírez	MF	(Turkey) Manisa F.K.	Free transfer	
6 October 2025	(Bosnia and Herzegovina) Samir Zeljković	MF	(Serbia) FK Radnički 1923	Free transfer	
6 October 2025	(Nigeria) Effiong Nsungusi	FW	(Romania) FC UTA Arad	Free transfer	
21 October 2025	(Brazil) Pablo Santos	DF	(Armenia) FC Noah	Free transfer	
24 October 2025	(India) Bikash Singh Sagolsem	DF	(India) Kerala Blasters	Free transfer	
24 October 2025	(India) Arshdeep Singh	GK	(India) Hyderabad	Free transfer	
25 November 2025	(Nigeria) Bede Osuji Amarachi	FW	(Turkey) Manisa F.K.	Free transfer	

=== Out ===
Date	Player	Position	To	Transfer Fee	Ref.
5 June 2025	(Greece) Petros Giakoumakis	FW	(Greece) Niki Volos F.C.	Free transfer	
6 June 2025	(Croatia) Filip Mrzljak	MF	(Russia) FC Ufa	Free transfer	
7 June 2025	(Croatia) Ivan Novoselec	DF	(Iraq) Duhok SC	Free transfer	
8 June 2025	(India) Denechandra Meitei	DF		Free transfer	
17 June 2025	(Hungary) (Bosnia and Herzegovina) Asmir Suljić	MF	(Hungary) Szeged-Csanád GA	Free transfer	
19 June 2025	(Slovenia) Luka Majcen	FW	(India) Diamond Harbour FC	Free transfer	
20 June 2025	(India) Melroy Assisi	DF	(India) Diamond Harbour FC		
9 July 2025	(Argentina) Ezequiel Pulga Vidal	FW	(Indonesia) PSIM Yogyakarta	Free transfer	
24 July 2025	(India) Abhishek Singh Tekcham	DF	(India) Mohun Bagan Super Giant		
11 November 2025	(India) Samuel Kynshi	MF	(India) Gokulam Kerala		
11 November 2025	(India) Tejas Krishna	DF	(India) Thrissur Magic FC		
4 February 2026	(India) Ravi Kumar	GK	(India) Jamshedpur FC	Free transfer	

== Preseason and Friendlies ==
Punjab played 2 friendly matches – against Namdhari and Delhi on 5 October and 19 October respectively. Punjab won both the matches comfortably by 2–1 and 4–1. Suresh Meitei and Kipgen scored for Punjab in the 2–1 victory against Namdhari. Kipgen, Ninthoi, Nikhil Prabhu and Omang scored for Punjab in the 4–1 victory against Delhi. In January the team played two more friendlies against the same opponents as the start of the league season was delayed.

=== Matches ===
5 October 2025 Friendly	Punjab	2–1	Namdhari	Sri Bhaini Sahib
10:00 IST	Suresh 79' (pen.); Kipgen 82'		Guilherme 65'	Stadium: Namdhari Football Ground; Attendance: 0 (Note: Closed door friendly match.)

19 October 2025 Friendly	Punjab	4–1	SC Delhi	Delhi
10:00 IST	Kipgen 36'; Ninthoi 42'; Nikhil 50'; Omang 85'		Saji 54'	Attendance: 0

10/11 January 2026 Friendly	Punjab FC	7–1	Namdhari FC
				Attendance: 0

19 January 2026 Friendly	Punjab FC	2–0	SC Delhi

== Competitions ==
=== Overall record ===
Competition	First match	Last match	Starting round	Final position	Record							
Competition	First match	Last match	Starting round	Final position	Pld	W	D	L	GF	GA	GD	Win %
Durand Cup	3 August 2025	9 August 2025	Group stage	Group stage	3	1	1	1	2	2	+0	33.33
Super Cup	27 October 2025	4 December 2025	Group stage	Semi-final	4	2	1	1	7	3	+4	50.00
Indian Super League	23 February 2026	21 May 2026	Round 1	6th	13	6	4	3	18	12	+6	46.15
Punjab State Super League (Note: Punjab FC fielded mostly their Reserve team for the tournament.)	1 August 2025	30 October 2025	Matchday 1	Champions	18	12	3	3	32	13	+19	66.67
Total					38	21	9	8	59	30	+29	55.26

Last updated: 4 December 2025
Source: Soccerway

=== Durand Cup ===
==== Table ====
Pos	Team	Pld	W	D	L	GF	GA	GD	Pts	Qualification	BDO	PUN	ITB	KMS
1	Bodoland (H)	3	3	0	0	7	1	+6	9	knockout stage		1–0	4–0	2–1
2	Punjab	3	1	1	1	2	2	0	4				0–0	2–1
3	ITB Police	3	1	1	1	2	5	−3	4					2–1
4	Karbi Anglong Morning Star	3	0	0	3	3	6	−3	0					

Source: DFTS
Legend: Blue = home team win; Yellow = draw; Red = away team win.
Rules for classification: Group stage tiebreakers
(H) Hosts

==== Matches ====
3 August 2025 Group stage	Morning Star	1–2	Punjab FC	Kokrajhar, Bodoland, Assam
16:00 IST	Olaleye 69'	Report	Pramveer 73'; Sanathoi 90+2'	Stadium: SAI Stadium; Attendance: 3,500; Referee: Harish Kundu; Man of the Match: Pramveer Singh (Punjab)

6 August 2025 Group stage	ITBP FT	0–0	Punjab FC	Kokrajhar, Bodoland, Assam
16:00 IST		Report		Stadium: SAI Stadium; Attendance: 1,400; Referee: Jarvish Macwan; Man of the Match: Donborlang Nongkynrih (ITBP)

9 August 2025 Group stage	Punjab FC	0–1	Bodoland	Kokrajhar, Bodoland, Assam
16:00 IST		Report	Blandon 69'	Stadium: SAI Stadium; Attendance: 12,545; Referee: Surojit Das; Man of the Match: Robinson Blandon (Bodoland)

=== Super Cup ===
Punjab participated in the Super Cup and was grouped into Group C alongside Bengaluru, Mohammedan and Gokulam Kerala.

==== Group stage ====
Pos	Team	Pld	W	D	L	GF	GA	GD	Pts	Qualification	PFC	BFC	GOK	MDS
1	Punjab	3	2	1	0	6	0	+6	7 (Note: Punjab qualified after winning the penalty shoot-out.)	Advance to knockout stage		0–0	3–0	3–0
2	Bengaluru	3	2	1	0	6	0	+6	7				4–0	2–0
3	Gokulam Kerala	3	1	0	2	3	7	−4	3					3–0
4	Mohammedan	3	0	0	3	0	8	−8	0					

Source: AIFF
Legend: Blue = home team win; Yellow = draw; Red = away team win.
Rules for classification: 1) points; 2) head-to-head points; 3) head-to-head goal difference; 4) goal difference; 5) number of goals scored; 6) Penalty shoot-out if only two teams are tied and they met in the last round of the group; 7) Disciplinary points; 8) drawing of lots

==== Bracket ====
Semifinals
A1	East Bengal	3
C1	Punjab	1
B1	Goa	2
D1	Mumbai City	1

Final
SF1	East Bengal	0 (5)
SF2	Goa (p)	0 (6)

==== Matches ====
27 October 2025 Group stage	Punjab	3–0	Gokulam Kerala	Bambolim
16:30 IST	Suhail 2'; Prabhu 10'; Princeton 43'	Report		Stadium: GMC Athletic Stadium; Attendance: 189; Referee: K Ramdasan

1 November 2025 Group stage	Mohammedan	0–3	Punjab	Bambolim
16:30 IST		Report	Ninthoi 27'; Zeljković 43'; Kipgen 73'	Stadium: GMC Athletic Stadium; Attendance: 123; Referee: Tejas Nagvenkar

5 November 2025 Group stage	Bengaluru	0–0 (4–5 p)	Punjab	Fatorda
16:30 IST		Report		Stadium: Fatorda Stadium; Attendance: 100; Referee: Ashwin; Man of the Match: Muheet Shabir (Punjab)
	Penalties
	Wangjam (penalty scored); Bheke (penalty scored); Williams (penalty missed); Chhetri (penalty scored); Sánchez (penalty scored)		(penalty scored) Nsungusi; (penalty scored) Rebello; (penalty scored) Zeljković; (penalty scored) Augustine; (penalty scored) V. Rai

4 December 2025 Semi-final	East Bengal	3–1	Punjab	Fatorda
16:30 IST	Rashid 12'; Kevin 45+3'; Saúl 70'	Report	Ramírez 34' (pen.)	Stadium: Fatorda Stadium; Attendance: 300; Referee: Ashwin

=== Indian Super League ===
==== Table ====
Pos	Team	Pld	W	D	L	GF	GA	GD	Pts	Qualification
4	Bengaluru	13	6	5	2	18	12	+6	23	
5	Jamshedpur	13	6	4	3	15	10	+5	22 (Note: Head-to-head points: Jamshedpur 3, Punjab 0.)	
6	Punjab	13	6	4	3	18	12	+6	22	
7	Goa	13	5	5	3	15	11	+4	20	Qualification for the Champions League Two qualifying playoffs (Note: Goa qualified for the AFC Champions League Two qualifying playoffs as the 2025–26 AIFF Super Cup winners.)
8	Kerala Blasters	13	5	2	6	15	17	−2	17	

Source: Indian Super League
Rules for classification: 1) points; 2) goal difference; 3) number of goals scored; 4) head-to-head points; 5) head-to-head goal difference; 6) head-to-head goals scored; 7) fair play ranking; 8) drawing of lots.
(Note: Head-to-head record is used only after all the matches between the teams in question have been played).

==== Matches ====
16 February 2026 1	Odisha FC	Postponed	Punjab FC
5:00 PM IST
Note: The match was postponed due to Odisha FC not having finalised a home venue for the season.

21 February 2026 2	Jamshedpur FC	1–0	Punjab FC	Jamshedpur
7:30 PM IST	Barretto 78'; Halder (yellow card) 50'; Mark Zo (yellow card) 87'	Report	Varghese (yellow card) 81'	Stadium: JRD Tata Sports Complex; Attendance: 7,230; Referee: Surojit Das

27 February 2026 3	Bengaluru FC	0–2	Punjab FC	Bengaluru
7:30 PM IST	Williams (yellow card) 53'; Roshan (yellow card) 90+4'	Report	Effiong 20' 32'; Shabong (yellow card) 72'; Zeljković (yellow card) 79'	Stadium: Sree Kanteerava Stadium; Attendance: 9,614; Referee: Ramachandran Venkatesh

9 March 2026 4	Punjab FC	1–1	NorthEast United	New Delhi
7:30 PM IST	Effiong 63'; Varghese (yellow card) 59'	Report	Gogoi 60'; Rinzuala (yellow card) 57'; Mayakkannan (yellow card) 84'	Stadium: Jawaharlal Nehru Stadium, Delhi; Attendance: 3,897; Referee: Harish Kundu

16 March 2026 5	Punjab FC	1–1	FC Goa	New Delhi
7:30 PM IST	Effiong 27' (red card) 48'	Report	Ayush Chhetri (yellow card) 39'; Dražić 53'; Tavora (yellow card) 85'; Raynier Fernandes (yellow card) 90+6'	Stadium: Jawaharlal Nehru Stadium, Delhi; Attendance: 3,216; Referee: Crystal John

21 March 2026 6	Kerala Blasters	1–3	Punjab FC	Kochi
7:30 PM IST	Arsh Shaikh (yellow card) 4'; Roos-Trujillo (yellow card) 56' (yellow-red card) 90+3'; Ndiaye 65'; Naocha (yellow card) 75'; Sandeep (yellow card) 82'; Ruivah (yellow card) 86'	Report	Samir Zeljković 7'; Bede Osuji 17'; Bijoy Varghese (yellow card) 21'; Dani Ramírez 38'	Stadium: Kaloor Stadium; Attendance: 2,863; Referee: Ashwin

3 April 2026 7	Punjab FC	2–1	Mohammedan SC	New Delhi
7:30 PM IST	Effiong Nsungusi 47'; Dani Ramírez 52'; Lhungdim (yellow card) 69'; Bede Osuji (yellow card) 72'	Report	Lalremsanga 29'; Yash Chickro (yellow card) 48'; Gaurav Bora (yellow card) 48'	Stadium: Jawaharlal Nehru Stadium, Delhi; Attendance: 2,906; Referee: Jamal Mohamed

12 April 2026 8	Mohun Bagan SG	3–2	Punjab FC	Kolkata
7:30 PM IST	Maclaren 29' (yellow card) 90+9'; Bose (yellow card) 40'; Sahal 73'; Cummings 90+1' (yellow card) 90+4'	Report	Dani Ramírez 12'; Pramveer (yellow card) 41'; Effiong 59' (yellow card) 67'; Likmabam (yellow card) 90'	Stadium: Salt Lake Stadium; Attendance: 12,222; Referee: Ramachandran Venkatesh

20 April 2026 9	Punjab FC	3–0	Inter Kashi	New Delhi
7:30 PM IST	Zeljković 37'; Effiong 51'; Osuji (yellow card) 54' (goal) 72'	Report	Rane (yellow card) 78'	Stadium: Jawaharlal Nehru Stadium, Delhi; Referee: Jehrul Islam

2 May 2026 11	SC Delhi	0–0	Punjab FC	New Delhi
7:30 PM IST	Sourav K. (yellow card) 73'; Hangshing (yellow card) 84'	Report	Varghese (yellow card) 70'; Effiong (yellow card) 90+2'	Stadium: Jawaharlal Nehru Stadium, Delhi; Attendance: 8,261; Referee: Surojit Das

6 May 2026 12	Punjab FC	1–0	Chennaiyin	New Delhi
7:30 PM IST	Hnamte 84' (o.g.); Lhungdim (yellow card) 89'	Report	Choudhary (yellow card) 44'	Stadium: Jawaharlal Nehru Stadium, Delhi; Referee: Aditya Purkayastha

11 May 2026 10	East Bengal	0–0	Punjab FC	Kolkata
7:30 PM IST	Souvik (yellow card) 15'; Rashid (yellow card) 31'; Miguel Figueira (yellow card) 45+1'	Report		Stadium: Salt Lake Stadium; Referee: Crystal John

16 May 2026 1	Odisha	2–3	Punjab FC	Margao
7:30 PM IST	Suhair 71'; Kartik Hantal 90+6'	Report	Kipgen 69'; Osuji 89'; Dani Ramírez 90+4'; Varghese (yellow card) 90+8'	Stadium: Fatorda Stadium; Attendance: 156; Referee: Tejas Nagvenkar

21 May 2026 13	Punjab FC	0–2	Mumbai City	New Delhi
7:30 PM IST	Uvais (yellow card) 26'; Pablo (yellow card) 44'; Augustine (yellow card) 67' (yellow-red card) 67'; Zeljković (yellow card) 83'; Pramveer (red card) 90'; Shabong (yellow card) 90+6'; Varghese (yellow card) 90+11'	Report	Valpuia 80' (yellow card) 90'; Vikram Partap 90+12' (yellow card) 90+11' (yellow-red card) 90+13'	Stadium: Jawaharlal Nehru Stadium, Delhi; Attendance: 3,967; Referee: Pratik Mondal

== Reserves and Academy ==
=== Punjab State Super League ===
Pos	Team	Pld	W	D	L	GF	GA	GD	Pts	Qualification	RGP	SPS	RCF	BSF	DFC	NFC	IFC	PP	OJS	YFC
1	Punjab FC (C)	18	12	3	3	32	13	+19	39	Champions		2–3	1–0	3–0	1–3	4–0	0–0	1–0	2–0	3–0
2	Sher-e-Punjab SC (Q)	18	10	4	4	36	27	+9	34	Qualification for I-League 3 (Note: If the top teams are already playing in national leagues, then the next highest ranked team(s) would be eligible for I-League 3.)	0–0		0–0	1–1	4–3	1–1	3–1	6–3	3–2	4–1
3	RCF FC	18	7	8	3	28	19	+9	29		2–2	4–0		2–0	2–2	0–0	3–2	0–0	1–3	0–0
4	BSF FC	18	9	2	7	25	23	+2	29		0–2	3–1	2–1		1–2	0–2	0–1	3–0	1–2	3–1
5	Dalbir FA	18	7	5	6	25	23	+2	26		0–1	1–2	0–3	3–1		0–0	2–1	0–0	0–1	1–0
6	Namdhari FC	18	7	4	7	26	21	+5	25		2–0	1–3	0–1	0–1	1–1		1–2	2–0	5–1	5–1
7	International FC	18	7	3	8	22	22	0	24		0–2	2–1	0–0	1–2	3–0	1–2		1–0	2–0	3–0
8	Punjab Police	18	6	5	7	19	26	−7	23		1–2	2–1	2–2	0–0	0–3	2–1	2–1		2–1	1–0
9	Olympian Jarnail FA (R)	18	4	3	11	25	35	−10	15	Relegation to Punjab State 2nd Division	2–3	0–1	3–4	2–3	1–1	3–2	1–1	1–1		3–1
10	Young FC (R)	18	2	1	15	12	41	−29	7	Relegation to Punjab State 2nd Division	0–3	0–2	2–3	0–3	1–3	0–1	3–0	1–3	1–0	

Source: The Away End
Legend: Blue = home team win; Yellow = draw; Red = away team win.
Rules for classification: 1) points; 2) head-to-head points; 3) head-to-head goal difference; 4) head-to-head goals scored; 5) goal difference; 6) number of goals scored; 7) fair play ranking; 8) drawing of lots
(C) Champions; (Q) Qualified for the phase indicated; (R) Relegated

== Summary ==
=== August 2025 ===
Punjab FC started their Durand Cup campaign on 3 August against Karbi Anglong Morning Star FC in Kokrajhar, Assam with an all-domestic lineup. The match ended in a 2-1 win for Punjab, courtesy goals by Pramveer and Sanathoi. Punjab then played against ITBP FT and were held to a goalless draw. In the third match on 9 August, Punjab faced resilient Bodoland FC and were handed a tough loss by them which brought an end to Punjab's Durand Cup campaign.

=== October to December 2025 ===
The AIFF decided to organise the 2025-26 Super Cup in Goa before the Indian Super League due to administrative problems between the federation and their commercial partners. The team was placed in Group C with Bengaluru FC, Mohammedan SC and Gokulam Kerala. Punjab FC started the campaign on 27 October against Gokulam Kerala, winning 3–0 with goals from Suhail, Prabhu and Princeton. This was followed by another 3–0 win over Mohammedan SC on 1 November, with Ninthoi, Samir and Kipgen scoring this time. Bengaluru FC had won its own first two matches with the same overall goal difference, which meant that the last group-stage match between these two sides would be a de-facto knockout match, with a penalty shootout in case of a draw. After a 0–0 draw in regular time, Punjab won the penalty shootout by 5–4, scoring all 5 penalties while Bengaluru's Ryan Williams missed his kick against Muheet Shabir. A month-long break split the Super Cup group stages from the knockout stage. On 4 December, Punjab travelled to Goa again to face East Bengal in the semi-final. Despite a goal from Dani, East Bengal won 3–1 and eliminated Punjab from the competition.

=== February 2026 ===
In the shortened 2025–26 Indian Super League season, all teams were to face the other teams only once, some at home and some away. Punjab FC was scheduled to play 6 matches at home and 7 matches away, although one of them against SC Delhi at the JLN Stadium of New Delhi, which was the club's home ground for this season once again. Punjab's opening league fixture away against Odisha FC on 16 February was postponed to May due to Odisha not having an arrangement for a home ground. On 21 February, Punjab travelled to the Furnace to face Jamshedpur, losing the match 1–0. On 27 February, Punjab faced Bengaluru at the Kanteerava Stadium and secured a solid 2–0 away win against one of the strong sides of the league. The new Nigerian signing Effiong Nsungusi scored both goals.

=== March 2026 ===
Punjab's first home match of the league season on 9 March against NorthEast United ended in a disappointing 1–1 draw. On 16 March, Punjab faced FC Goa at home. After scoring in the 27th minute, Effiong was sent off in the 48th minute. Goa then scored within 6 minutes of the red card and the match finished 1–1. Punjab registered a 3–1 win at Kochi against Kerala Blasters on 21 March, the third time in a row that the team has won away against the Blasters in the ISL. Bede and Dani scored their first goals for the club. Up until this match, all goals for the club in this season's league were scored by Effiong.

=== April 2026 ===
On 3 April, Punjab managed a 2–1 win against relegation favourites Mohammedan SC at home after conceding first in the first half. On 12 April, Punjab travelled to Kolkata for a huge clash against Mohun Bagan Super Giant. Dani scored early for Punjab but the score was equalised by Jamie Maclaren for the hosts in the 29th minute. Punjab re-took the lead in the second half through Effiong. Sahal Abdul Samad equalised once again for Mohun Bagan with a long-range goal. Punjab then failed to convert a couple of good chances before conceding a free kick close to the goal in added time. Jason Cummings kicked the ball into the net. The goal was allowed despite Punjab players protesting that Mohun Bagan's Tom Aldred fouled goalkeeper Arshdeep Singh during play. The incident caused Punjab to lose the match 3–2.

Punjab faced newly promoted side Inter Kashi on 20 April and recorded a 3–0 win at home with goals from Samir, Effiong and Bede.

=== May 2026 ===
Punjab drew newly-relocated SC Delhi 0–0 on 2 May at the two teams' shared ground. On 6 May at home against Chennaiyin FC, Punjab won 1–0 thanks to a late own goal from Chennaiyin's Lalrinliana Hnamte.

Punjab faced East Bengal in Kolkata on 11 May in an important clash. Despite both clubs coming very close to scoring, the match ended 0–0. On 16 May Punjab defeated Odisha FC in the re-arranged fixture from the first round, winning 3–2. Kipgen scored his first ISL goal.

Going into the league's final matchday on 21 May, Punjab had a chance to win the league depending upon the results of two other matches. Punjab would be the ISL champions if they beat Mumbai City in their last match while both East Bengal and Mohun Bagan dropped points in their respective matches. In case only East Bengal dropped points, Punjab would manage to qualify for the AFC Champions League Two qualifiers as the champions in that scenario (Mohun Bagan) were banned from competing in AFC competitions. In the four matches taking place simultaneously on 21 May, both East Bengal and Mohun Bagan conceded first. However, Punjab was unable to score in a closely contested game as Effiong and Bede missed two chances. In the second half, Leon Augustine was sent off after arguing with the referee, reducing the team to 10 men. Subsequently, Punjab conceded a goal in the 80th minute, scored by former Punjab FC player Valpuia. In the 90th minute, Pramveer was also sent off for clashing with Valpuia. The 9-men Punjab conceded another goal in the 12th minute of added time, losing 2–0 at the end. East Bengal and Mohun Bagan both eventually won their respective matches, the former winning the title.

Punjab finished 6th, the team's highest finish in the ISL, tied on points with Jamshedpur FC (to whom Punjab had lost, hence being placed below them).

== Statistics ==
=== Squad appearances and goals ===
==== All competitions ====
No.	Pos	Nat	Player	Total		Super League		Durand Cup		Super Cup	
No.	Pos	Nat	Player	Apps	Goals	Apps	Goals	Apps	Goals	Apps	Goals
Goalkeepers
13	GK	(India) IND	Arshdeep Singh	12	0	12	0	0	0	0	0
78	GK	(India) IND	Muheet Shabir Khan	5	0	1	0	0	0	4	0
	GK	(India) IND	Ravi Kumar	3	0	0	0	3	0	0	0
Defenders
2	DF	(India) IND	Muhammad Uvais	18	0	12	0	3	0	3	0
3	DF	(India) IND	Bijoy Varghese	17	0	12	0	1	0	4	0
8	DF	(Bosnia and Herzegovina) BIH	Samir Zeljković	17	3	13	2	0	0	4	1
26	DF	(India) IND	Likmabam Rakesh Meitei	2	0	2	0	0	0	0	0
27	DF	(Brazil) BRA	Pablo Santos	10	0	10	0	0	0	0	0
35	DF	(India) IND	Pramveer	13	1	9	0	2	1	2	0
74	DF	(India) IND	Suresh Meitei	12	0	5	0	3	0	4	0
Midfielders
4	DF	(India) IND	Nikhil Prabhu	9	1	2	0	3	0	4	1
6	MF	(India) IND	Ricky Shabong	20	0	13	0	3	0	4	0
10	MF	(Spain) ESP	Dani Ramírez	17	5	13	4	0	0	4	1
11	MF	(India) IND	Princeton Rebello	9	1	3	0	2	0	4	1
12	MF	(India) IND	Khaiminthang Lhungdim	18	0	12	0	3	0	3	0
16	MF	(India) IND	Vinit Rai	9	0	5	0	1	0	3	0
19	MF	(India) IND	Manglenthang Kipgen	19	2	13	1	3	0	3	1
21	MF	(India) IND	Singamayum Shami	7	0	4	0	3	0	0	0
31	MF	(India) IND	Leon Augustine	19	0	12	0	3	0	4	0
Forwards
7	FW	(India) IND	Ninthoi Meetei	11	1	5	0	3	0	3	1
9	FW	(Nigeria) NGR	Effiong Nsungusi	15	7	12	7	0	0	3	0
14	FW	(India) IND	Vishal Yadav	3	0	0	0	3	0	0	0
17	FW	(India) IND	Muhammad Suhail F	12	0	6	0	3	0	3	0
23	FW	(India) IND	Bikash Singh	5	0	4	0	0	0	1	0
24	FW	(India) IND	Ranjeet Pandre	4	0	2	0	2	0	0	0
40	FW	(Nigeria) NGR	Bede Osuji	14	3	13	3	0	0	1	0
-	FW	(India) IND	Konsam Sanathoi Singh	3	1	0	0	0	0	3	1
-	FW	(India) IND	Omang Dodum Singh	1	0	0	0	1	0	0	0

=== Most Goals ===
Sl. No.	Player	Durand Cup	Super Cup	League	Total goals
1	Effiong Nsungusi	0	0	7	7
2	Dani Ramírez	0	1	4	5
3	Samir Zeljković	0	1	2	3
3	Bede Osuji	0	0	3	3
5	Manglenthang Kipgen	0	1	1	2
6	Pramveer Singh	1	0	0	1
6	Konsam Sanathoi Singh	1	0	0	1
6	Nikhil Prabhu	0	1	0	1
6	Princeton Rebello	0	1	0	1
6	Ninthoinganba Meetei	0	1	0	1

=== Most Assists ===
Sl. No.	Player	Durand Cup	Super Cup	League	Total assists
1	Manglenthang Kipgen	0	0	3	3
1	Muhammad Suhail	0	2	1	3
1	Dani Ramírez	0	1	2	3
1	Samir Zeljković	0	0	3	3
2	Bede Osuji	0	0	2	2
2	Effiong Nsungusi	0	0	2	2
2	Muhammad Uvais	1	0	1	2
2	Leon Augustine	0	1	1	2
3	Singamayum Shami	1	0	0	1
3	Princeton Rebello	0	1	0	1
3	Ninthoinganba Meetei	0	1	0	1
3	Khaiminthang Lhungdim	0	0	1	1

=== Cleansheets ===
Sl. No.	Player	Matches played	Cleansheets kept	Cleansheet %
1	Muheet Shabir	5	4	80
2	Arshdeep Singh	12	4	33.3
3	Ravi Kumar	3	1	33.3
