= Nikhil Prabhu =

Indian footballer (born 2000)

Personal information
- Full name: Naravi Nikhil Jayantha Prabhu
- Date of birth: 2 October 2000 (age 26)
- Place of birth: Hyderabad, Telangana, India
- Positions: Defensive midfielder; centre-back

Team information
- Current team: Punjab
- Number: 4

Youth career
- –2017: Mumbai U-16
- 2017–2018: Thane Football School of India U18
- 2018–2019: Pune City U18
- 2019–2020: Hyderabad B

Senior career*
Years	Team	Apps	(Gls)
2020–2022	Hyderabad	0	(0)
2022	→ Odisha (loan)	3	(0)
2022–2023	Odisha	3	(0)
2023	Goa	2	(0)
2023–	Punjab	47	(1)

International career^{‡}
2025–	India	11	(0)
Medal record
Representing India
CAFA Nations Cup
Third place	2025 Tajikistan–Uzbekistan	Team
- * Club domestic league appearances and goals as of 16:30, 31 October 2026 (UTC) ‡ National team caps and goals as of 17 November 2026 (UTC)

Naravi Nikhil Jayantha Prabhu (born 2 October 2000) is an Indian professional footballer who plays as a defensive midfielder for Indian Super League club Punjab and the Indian national team.

== Early life ==
Prabhu was born in Hyderabad, but moved to Mumbai with his family at the age of nine.

== Club career ==
=== Youth career ===
Prabhu got into football at the age of 9 when his school had a compulsory one sport option. He continued playing, went on to represent Gujarat in state level tournaments at an early age. However, after his family shifted to Mumbai, he was signed by then-I-League club Mumbai FC's youth team, where he played for three years.

=== Senior career ===
==== Hyderabad FC ====
Prabhu signed for Indian Super League club Hyderabad FC on a three-year deal, ahead of the 2019–20 season. After a year in the reserve team, he was promoted to the senior squad ahead of the 2020–21 season. However, he failed to make a single appearance for the club throughout the season.

Prabhu remained with Hyderabad for the next season as well, but once again failed to make any appearances until he was loaned out to fellow ISL club Odisha FC.

==== Odisha FC ====
On 30 December 2021, Odisha announced the arrival of Prabhu on loan, with an option for a permanent transfer at the end of the season. He made his debut for the club, and his senior debut, on 23 January 2022 away against ATK Mohun Bagan, replacing Hector Rodas at half time. The match eventually ended 0-0. Prabhu made two further appearances that season, coming on as a substitute in the club's last two games of the season.

On 25 May 2022, Odisha confirmed that Prabhu was joining the club permanently for an undisclosed fee. He signed a 2-year contract, which had an option to extend for a further year. He made his first league appearance of the season away against East Bengal, coming on at half time as a substitute for Osama Malik with the club 2–0 down. However, Odisha came back and scored 4 goals in the second half, to win the match 4–2. Prabhu made two further appearances for Odisha, before completing a mid-season switch to FC Goa.

==== FC Goa ====
On 2 February 2023, FC Goa confirmed the signing of Prabhu on one-a-half-year contract. He made his debut for the club on 16 February 2023 at home against Chennaiyin FC, coming on as a half-time substitute for Ayush Chhetri. However, the Gaurs went on to lose the match 2–1. He played again in the club's next match, a 3–1 loss away to Bengaluru FC.

==== Punjab FC ====
===== 2023–24 season =====
Following their promotion to the ISL, Punjab FC announced Prabhu's signing on 22 June 2023, signing a three-year contract with the Shers. He made his debut for the club on 7 August 2023 in the 2023 Durand Cup, playing from the start in a 2–0 loss to Mohun Bagan. Prabhu made his ISL debut for the club on 23 September 2023, playing from the start in a 3–1 loss for the Shers. Prabhu was deployed as a defensive midfielder from the start for the first time by then-Punjab head coach Staikos Vergetis away against Jamshedpur FC, as Prabhu played the full 90 minutes in an eventual 0–0 draw.

Prabhu scored his first goal for Punjab FC, and his first senior goal away against Bengaluru FC, scoring a close-range tap-in from a freekick near the halfway line by French midfielder Madih Talal in the 19th minute. The match eventually ended in a 3–3 draw. Prabhu played 20 out of Punjab's 22 games in the 23–24 season, only missing out on home games against Chennaiyin and Goa as a result of suspension due to yellow-card accumulation. He made a total of 30 appearances for the club in all competitions, primarily as a defensive midfielder.

===== 2024–25 season =====
The following season, even after the departure of Vergetis, new Punjab head coach Panos Dilmperis continued to deploy Prabhu in defensive midfield. Prabhu made his first appearance of the season in the Durand Cup, playing the first 73 minutes against CISF Protectors in an eventual 3–0 win for Punjab.

Prabhu's first ISL appearance came against Kerala Blasters, playing the full 90 minutes at defensive midfield in an eventual 1–2 win for Punjab FC. Prabhu was named as Punjab FC captain for the first time in the reverse fixture against Kerala Blasters on 5 January 2025. Prabhu was given the armband for the match due to the regular captains Luka Majcen and Mushaga Bakenga being absent from the squad, and Filip Mrzljak being named on the bench. However, the Shers lost the match 1–0 after a Noah Sadaoui penalty in the 44th minute being the deciding goal.

Prabhu's first win as captain of Punjab came at home against Bengaluru FC on 1 February 2025. With Bakenga having retired, and both Majcen and Mrzjlak on the bench, Prabhu was given the armband again. This time though, Punjab won the game 3–2 after a late winner from Majcen. Prabhu ended the season with 21 league appearances, as Punjab finished tenth.

== International career ==
On 28 May 2025, Prabhu was called up to the India squad for the first time, for a friendly against Thailand, and an AFC Asian Cup qualifier against Hong Kong. Prabhu made his international debut on 4 June 2025 against Thailand, coming on as a 67th-minute substitute for Ayush Chhetri, as India succumbed to a 2–0 defeat.

== Career statistics ==
=== Club ===
As of 31 October 2026

Club	Season	League			Cup		AFC		Total	
Club	Season	Division	Apps	Goals	Apps	Goals	Apps	Goals	Apps	Goals
Hyderabad	2020–21	Indian Super League	0	0	0	0	—		0	0
Hyderabad	21–22	Indian Super League	0	0	0	0	—		0	0
Hyderabad	Hyderabad total		0	0	0	0	0	0	0	0
Odisha (loan)	21–22	Indian Super League	3	0	0	0	—		3	0
Odisha	22–23	Indian Super League	3	0	1 (Note: Appearance(s) in Durand Cup)	0	—		4	0
Odisha	Odisha total		6	0	1	0	0	0	7	0
Goa	22–23	Indian Super League	2	0	2	0	—		4	0
Goa	Goa total		2	0	2 (Note: Appearance(s) in Super Cup)	0	0	0	4	0
Punjab	23–24	Indian Super League	20	1	6	0	—		26	1
Punjab	24–25	Indian Super League	21	0	6	0	—		27	0
Punjab	25–26	Indian Super League	2	0	7	1	—		9	1
Punjab	26–27	Indian Super League	4	0	2 (Note: Appearances in IFA Shield)	0	—		6	0
Punjab	Punjab total		47	1	21	1	0	0	68	2
Career total			55	1	24	1	0	0	79	2

=== International ===
As of 17 November 2026

National team	Year	Apps	Goals
India	2025	8	0
India	2026	3	0
Total		11	0

== Honours ==
India

- SAFF Championship: 2026
