= Gurkirat Singh =

Indian footballer (born 2003)

Personal information
- Full name: Gurkirat Singh
- Date of birth: 16 July 2003 (age 23)
- Place of birth: Chandigarh, India
- Height: 1.75 m (5 ft 9 in)
- Positions: Striker; left winger

Team information
- Current team: Punjab
- Number: 91

Youth career
- AIFF Elite Academy

Senior career*
Years	Team	Apps	(Gls)
2018–2021	Indian Arrows	18	(1)
2021–2024	Mumbai City	28	(1)
2024–2026	Chennaiyin	15	(0)
2026–	Punjab	2	(1)

International career^{‡}
2017–2018	India U16	26	(0)
2018–2020	India U17	2	(0)
2019–2022	India U19	3	(1)
2022–	India U20	8	(11)
2023–	India U23	4	(0)
- * Club domestic league appearances and goals as of 23:44, 19 October 2026 (UTC) ‡ National team caps and goals as of 19:15, 22 March 2024 (UTC)

Gurkirat Singh (born 16 July 2003) is an Indian professional footballer who plays as a forward for Indian Super League club Punjab.

== Club career ==
=== Mumbai City ===
On September 18, 2021, Indian Super League club Mumbai City announced the signing of Gurkirat from developmental club Indian Arrows on a 3-year contract, with an option to extend the contract by an extra year. He made his ISL debut on 1 December 2021, as an 80th-minute substitute in the club's 1–5 victory over ATK Mohun Bagan (now Mohun Bagan Super Giant). More than two years after his debut, Gurkirat scored his first ISL goal on 28 December 2023 against Chennaiyin FC, with a neat finish on his left foot from outside the area in the 90th minute. This strike was the last goal of the match, which ended 3–0 to The Islanders.

=== Chennaiyin ===
On 18 June 2024, following the expiry of his Mumbai City contract, Gurkirat signed for Chennaiyin on a 2-year contract.

== International career ==
Singh has represented the India U20 national team.

== Career statistics ==
=== Club ===
As of 31 October 2026

Club	Season	League			Cup		Continental		Total	
Club	Season	Division	Apps	Goals	Apps	Goals	Apps	Goals	Apps	Goals
Indian Arrows	2018–19	I-League	3	0	0	0	–		3	0
Indian Arrows	2019–20	I-League	4	0	0	0	–		4	0
Indian Arrows	2020–21	I-League	11	1	0	0	–		11	1
Indian Arrows	Total		18	1	0	0	0	0	18	1
Mumbai City	2021–22	Indian Super League	8	0	0	0	1 (Note: Appearance(s) in AFC Champions League)	0	9	0
Mumbai City	2022–23	Indian Super League	9	0	9 (Note: Appearance(s) in Durand Cup) (Note: Appearance(s) in Super Cup)	0	–		18	0
Mumbai City	2023–24	Indian Super League	11	1	8	1	3	0	22	2
Mumbai City	Total		28	1	17	1	4	0	49	2
Chennaiyin	2024–25	Indian Super League	12	0	0	0	–		12	0
Chennaiyin	2025–26	Indian Super League	3	0	2	0	–		5	0
Chennaiyin	Total		15	0	2	0	0	0	17	0
Punjab	2026–27	Indian Super League	4	1	1 (Note: Appearance in IFA Shield)	1	–		5	2
Career total			65	3	20	2	4	0	89	5

== Honours ==
India U-20

- OFC Youth Development Tournament: 2019
- SAFF U-20 Championship: 2022

Individual

- 2022 SAFF U-20 Championship Most Valuable Player
- 2022 SAFF U-20 Championship Top Scorer (with 8 goals)

Mumbai City

- Indian Super League (Premiership): 2022–23
