= Samir Zeljković =

Bosnian footballer

Personal information
- Full name: Samir Zeljković
- Date of birth: 4 September 1997 (age 29)
- Place of birth: Sarajevo, Bosnia and Herzegovina
- Height: 1.84 m (6 ft 0 in)
- Position: Defensive midfielder

Team information
- Current team: Mohun Bagan
- Number: 8

Youth career
- 2010–2016: Sarajevo

Senior career*
| Years | Team | Apps | (Gls) |
| 2016–2017 | TOŠK Tešanj | 16 | (2) |
| 2017–2018 | Igman Konjic | 28 | (2) |
| 2018–2022 | Velež Mostar | 127 | (2) |
| 2022–2023 | Sarajevo | 3 | (0) |
| 2023–2024 | Bunyodkor | 8 | (1) |
| 2024–2025 | Radnički 1923 | 28 | (1) |
| 2025–2026 | Punjab | 13 | (2) |
| 2026– | Mohun Bagan | 12 | (1) |
- * Club domestic league appearances and goals as of 26 October 2026

Samir Zeljković (born 4 September 1997) is a Bosnian professional footballer who plays as a defensive midfielder for Indian Super League club Mohun Bagan.

== Club career ==
Zeljković made his professional debut in the Bosnian Premier League for Velež Mostar on 20 July 2019, starting in a 1–3 home loss against Mladost Doboj Kakanj.

== International career ==
In October 2020, Zeljković was called up to represent the Bosnia and Herzegovina national team, for a friendly game against Iran and for the 2020–21 UEFA Nations League games against Netherlands and Italy.

== Career statistics ==
As of match played May 2026

Appearances and goals by club, season and competition
| Club | Season | League | | | National cup (Note: Includes Bosnia and Herzegovina Cup, Uzbekistan Cup, Serbian Cup, AIFF Super Cup) | | Continental | | Others (Note: Includes Durand Cup) | | Total | |
| Club | Season | Division | Apps | Goals | Apps | Goals | Apps | Goals | Apps | Goals | Apps | Goals |
|---|---|---|---|---|---|---|---|---|---|---|---|---|
| Igman Konjic | 2017–18 | First League of FBiH | 28 | 2 | — | | — | | — | | 28 | 2 |
| Velež Mostar | 2018–19 | First League of FBiH | 26 | 0 | 0 | 0 | — | | — | | 26 | 0 |
| Velež Mostar | 2019–20 | Bosnian Premier League | 17 | 1 | 1 | 0 | — | | — | | 18 | 1 |
| Velež Mostar | 2020–21 | Bosnian Premier League | 28 | 1 | 0 | 0 | — | | — | | 28 | 1 |
| Velež Mostar | 2021–22 | Bosnian Premier League | 29 | 0 | 7 | 0 | 6 (Note: Appearance(s) in UEFA Europa Conference League) | 0 | — | | 42 | 0 |
| Velež Mostar | 2022–23 | Bosnian Premier League | 27 | 0 | 6 | 0 | 2 | 0 | — | | 35 | 0 |
| Velež Mostar | Total | | 127 | 2 | 14 | 0 | 8 | 0 | 0 | 0 | 149 | 2 |
| Sarajevo | 2023–24 | Bosnian Premier League | 3 | 0 | 1 | 0 | 2 | 0 | — | | 6 | 0 |
| Bunyodkor (loan) | 2024 | Uzbekistan Super League | 8 | 1 | 2 | 0 | — | | — | | 10 | 1 |
| Radnički 1923 | 2024–25 | Serbian SuperLiga | 28 | 1 | 2 | 0 | 1 | 0 | — | | 31 | 1 |
| Punjab FC | 2025–26 | Indian Super League | 13 | 2 | 4 (Note: Appearance(s) in AIFF Super Cup) | 1 | — | | — | | 17 | 3 |
| Mohun Bagan | 2025–26 | Indian Super League | 0 | 0 | 0 | 0 | — | | 0 | 0 | 0 | 0 |
| Career total | | | 197 | 8 | 23 | 1 | 11 | 0 | 0 | 0 | 241 | 9 |

== Honours ==
Mohun Bagan

• IFA Shield: 2026

Velež Mostar

- Bosnian Cup: 2021–22
- First League of FBiH: 2018–19
