= Alfred Planas =

Spanish footballer

Personal information
- Full name: Alfred Planas Moya
- Date of birth: 15 February 1996 (age 30)
- Place of birth: Maresme, Spain
- Height: 1.76 m (5 ft 9 in)
- Position: Winger

Team information
- Current team: Punjab

Youth career
- Atlétic Sant Pol
- 2006–2011: Damm
- 2011–2012: Calella
- 2012–2013: Espanyol
- 2013–2015: Damm
- 2015–2016: Málaga

Senior career*
Years	Team	Apps	(Gls)
2016–2017	Málaga B	21	(1)
2017–2018	Sant Andreu	34	(7)
2018–2019	Reus	19	(1)
2019–2020	Alcorcón	0	(0)
2019	→ Elche (loan)	2	(0)
2019–2020	→ Valencia B (loan)	21	(1)
2020–2021	Marbella	15	(1)
2021–2022	Sabadell	27	(0)
2022–2023	Cornellà	34	(2)
2023–2024	Unionistas	32	(1)
2024–2025	Sestao River	31	(2)
2025–2026	Gokulam Kerala	0	(0)
2026	Inter Kashi	13	(5)
2026–	Punjab	1	(0)
- * Club domestic league appearances and goals as of 14 October 2026

Alfred Planas Moya (born 15 February 1996) is a Spanish footballer who plays as a forward for Indian Super League club Punjab.

== Club career ==
Planas was born in Maresme, Barcelona, Catalonia, and represented Atlétic Sant Pol, CF Damm (two stints), FPE Calella, RCD Espanyol, CF Damm and Málaga CF as a youth. He made his senior debut with Málaga's reserve team on 24 September 2016, playing the last 15 minutes in a 5–0 Tercera División home rout of UD Dos Hermanas San Andrés.

Planas scored his first senior goal on 12 March 2017, the equalizer in a 2–2 away draw against Martos CD. On 13 July, he signed a one-year contract with UE Sant Andreu, also in the fourth division.

On 21 June 2018, Planas signed for CF Reus Deportiu and was initially assigned to the B team in the fourth division. He made his first-team debut on 19 August, starting in a 0–2 away loss against UD Las Palmas.

Planas scored his first professional goal on 15 September 2018, the only goal in an away defeat of CD Tenerife. In January 2019, as the club's financial situation worsened, he terminated his contract.

On 29 January 2019, Planas signed a two-and-a-half-year contract with AD Alcorcón, and was immediately loaned to fellow second division side Elche CF until June. On 12 July, he moved to Segunda División B side Valencia CF Mestalla also in a temporary deal.

On 17 August 2020, Planas agreed to a one-year deal with Marbella FC in division three, after terminating his contract with the Alfareros.

During 2023–24 Copa del Rey, he scored three goals for Unionistas and become 7th top scorer of the tournament alongside eleven other players. He scored a single goal in all-win matches against Gernika, Sporting Gijón, and Villarreal (via penalty), respectively throughout the tournament.

On 13 July 2024, Planas signed with Sestao River in the third tier.

On 30 September 2025, Planas joined I-League club Gokulam Kerala.

On 16 January 2025, Planas joined Indian Super League club Inter Kashi where he scored his first goal in any Asian league.
