= Muhammad Uvais =

Indian footballer

Muhammed Uvais
Personal information
- Full name: Muhammad Uvais Moyikkal
- Date of birth: 31 July 1998 (age 28)
- Place of birth: Nilambur, Kerala, India
- Height: 1.87 m (6 ft 2 in)
- Positions: Centre-back; left-back

Team information
- Current team: Punjab
- Number: 2

Youth career
- Sudeva

Senior career*
Years	Team	Apps	(Gls)
2017–2018	FC Kerala	8	(0)
2018–2019	FC Thrissur	6	(0)
2019–2020	Ozone	13	(0)
2020	Bengaluru United	7	(0)
2021	KSEB	7	(0)
2021–2022	Gokulam Kerala	18	(1)
2022–2025	Jamshedpur	44	(1)
2025–	Punjab	0	(0)

International career^{‡}
2025–	India	5	(0)
Medal record
Representing India
CAFA Nations Cup
Third place	2025 Tajikistan–Uzbekistan	Team
- * Club domestic league appearances and goals as of 16:10, 7 April 2025 (UTC) ‡ National team caps and goals as of 22:00, 9 October 2025 (UTC)

Muhammed Uvais Moyikkal (born 31 July 1998) is an Indian professional footballer who plays as a defender for Indian Super League club Punjab and the India national team.

== Club career ==
=== Gokulam Kerala ===
On 7 June 2021, Uvais joined I-League club Gokulam Kerala on a two-year contract.

=== Jamshedpur ===
Indian Super League (ISL) shield winner Jamshedpur FC has secured the services of Muhammed Uvais ahead of the upcoming season, the club announced. The Defender has joined the Red Miners on a three-year deal, which will keep him at JFC until 2025.

=== Punjab ===
Indian Super League Club Punjab announced That they are signing Jamshedpur left back Muhammad Uvais on Free transfer which will start his journey with them in ISL 25–26.

== International career ==
On 25 August 2025, Uvais was called up to the India squad for the first time by manager Khalid Jamil for the 2025 CAFA Nations Cup.

== Career statistics ==
=== Club ===
As of 3 May 2025

Club	Season	League			Cup		AFC		Total	
Club	Season	Division	Apps	Goals	Apps	Goals	Apps	Goals	Apps	Goals
Bengaluru United	2019–20	I-League 2nd Division	7	0	0	0	–		7	0
Gokulam Kerala	2021–22	I-League	18	1	8 (Note: Appearance(s) in Durand Cup) (Note: Appearance(s) in IFA Shield)	0	3 (Note: Appearance(s) in AFC Cup)	0	29	1
Jamshedpur	2022–23	Indian Super League	6	0	1 (Note: Appearance(s) in Super Cup)	0	–		7	0
Jamshedpur	2023–24	Indian Super League	11	0	4	0	–		15	0
Jamshedpur	2024–25	Indian Super League	27	1	7	0	–		34	1
Jamshedpur	Total		44	1	12	0	0	0	56	1
Punjab	2025–26	Indian Super League	0	0	3	0	0	0	3	0
Career total			69	2	23	0	3	0	95	2

=== International ===
As of 9 October 2025

National team	Year	Apps	Goals
India	2025	5	0
Total		5	0

== Honours ==
Gokulam Kerala

- I-League: 2021–22

India

- SAFF Championship: 2026
