= Ricky Shabong =

Indian footballer (born 2002)

Personal information
- Full name: Ricky John Shabong
- Date of birth: 29 December 2002 (age 23)
- Place of birth: Shillong, Meghalaya, India
- Position: Defensive midfielder

Team information
- Current team: Punjab
- Number: 6

Youth career
- Royal Wahingdoh

Senior career*
Years	Team	Apps	(Gls)
2019–2021	Indian Arrows	28	(0)
2021–2023	Mohun Bagan SG	1	(0)
2022	→ Rajasthan United (loan)	17	(0)
2023–	Punjab	47	(1)
2024	→ Punjab U-21	5	(1)

International career^{‡}
2017–2018	India U17	32	(1)
2019–	India U20	7	(1)
2026–	India	6	(0)
- * Club domestic league appearances and goals as of 19:22, 23 September 2023 (UTC) ‡ National team caps and goals as of 22:00, 6 October 2026 (UTC)

Ricky John Shabong (born 29 December 2002) is a professional footballer who plays as a defensive midfielder for Indian Super League club Punjab and the India national team.

== Career ==
Whilst playing for the Royal Wahingdoh academy, he was called up to the Indian national U-14 team in 2016. He was part of the Indian U-16 team that reached the quarterfinals of the 2018 AFC U-16 Championship in Malaysia. The midfielder was in the starting XI of each one of India's four matches.

Ricky made his professional debut for the side in the Arrow's first match of the 2019–20 season against Gokulam Kerala He started and played full match as Indian Arrows lost 0–1.He was also the captain of Punjab U21s that went on to win the 2024 Reliance Foundation Development League and he also led the same team which finished 3rd in the 2024 Next Generation Cup.

== Career statistics ==
=== Club ===
As of 21 January 2024

Club	Season	League			Cup		AFC		Total	
Club	Season	Division	Apps	Goals	Apps	Goals	Apps	Goals	Apps	Goals
Indian Arrows	2019–20	I-League	16	0	0	0	—		16	0
Indian Arrows	2020–21	I-League	12	0	0	0	—		12	0
Indian Arrows	Indian Arrows total		28	0	9	0	0	0	28	0
Mohun Bagan SG	2021–22	Indian Super League	0	0	0	0	—		0	0
Mohun Bagan SG	2022–23	Indian Super League	1	0	1 (Note: Appearance(s) in Durand Cup)	0	—		2	0
Mohun Bagan SG	Mohun Bagan total		1	0	1	0	0	0	2	0
Rajasthan United (loan)	2021–22	I-League	17	0	0	0	—		17	0
Punjab	2023–24	Indian Super League	10	0	6 (Note: Appearance(s) in Super Cup)	0	—		16	0
Punjab	2024-25	Indian Super League	24	1	2	0	—		26	1
Punjab	2025-26	Indian Super League	13	0	7	0	—		20	0
Punjab	Punjab FC total		47	1	15	0	0	0	62	1
Career total			93	1	16	0	0	0	109	1

=== International ===
As of 6 October 2026

National team	Year	Apps	Goals
India	2026	6	0
Total		6	0

== Honours ==
India U-20

- OFC Youth Development Tournament: 2019

India

- SAFF Championship: 2026
