= Punjab FC =

Association football club in Punjab, India

Punjab
- Full name: Punjab Football Club
- Nickname: The Shers
- Short name: Punjab FC
- Founded: 2020; 6 years ago (as Roundglass Punjab FC)
- Ground: Jawaharlal Nehru Stadium, Delhi
- Capacity: 60,254
- Owner: Roundglass Sports Pvt. Ltd.
- Head coach: Pavlos Dermitzakis
- Website: rgpunjabfc.com
Home colours	Away colours	Third colours

Punjab Football Club (formerly known as Roundglass Punjab FC) is an Indian professional football club founded in Mohali, Punjab. The club competes in the Indian Super League, the top flight of the Indian football league system. It was the first club to win promotion into the Indian Super League, doing so after winning the 2022–23 I-League title.

== History ==
In April 2020, Roundglass Sports Pvt. Ltd. completed the acquisition of the I-League club Minerva Punjab, rebranding it later that year as Roundglass Punjab FC. After promotion to the ISL, they changed name to Punjab FC in July 2023. On 15 June 2020, the club appointed Curtis Fleming as head coach. On 15 July, they appointed Nikolaos Topoliatis as new technical director, who would go on to play an important role in the club's progress over the next 5 years.

=== I-League (2020–2023) ===
==== 2020/21 ====
For the 2020–21 I-League season, Punjab inherited many players from the pre-takeover Punjab FC team including players like veteran defender Anwar Ali, Nepalese goalkeeper Kiran Chemjong and youngsters like Bikash Yumnam, Saurabh Bhanwalaand Ashray Bhardwaj. All matches were held in Kolkata in a bio-secure bubble due to the COVID-19 pandemic. The club's first league match since Roundglass takeover was against Aizawl which they won 1–0 thanks to a goal from Pritam Singh. In the first phase of the league, Punjab finished 2nd place with 5 wins, 3 draws and 2 losses, qualifying for the second phase (championship stage) with 18 points. In the championship stage, the team managed only 1 win from 5 matches, a 1–0 result against Real Kashmir and finished their season with a 2–3 loss to Churchill Brothers. They achieved 4th position overall with 22 points in 15 league matches. Bhutanese captain Chencho Gyeltshen was the team's top-scorer with 7 goals while Chemjong finished the season with 7 clean-sheets, the highest in the league.

==== 2021/22 ====
At the end of the 2020/21 season the club parted ways with head coach Curtis Fleming and appointed the two-time I-League winner former Bengaluru FC coach Ashley Westwood as head coach in July 2021.

Punjab started the 2021/22 season under Westwood with a 2–0 win against newly promoted Rajasthan United on 26 December. On 21 March, after a 1–1 draw against NEROCA, Westwood stepped down from his position despite the club having lost only 1 match until that point and sitting 3rd in the table. He was replaced by Technical Director for Youth Programme and experienced Dutch manager Ed Engelkes for the rest of the season. Although facing a 2–0 defeat to Real Kashmir in his first match in charge, Engelkes led the team to 4 consecutive wins immediately after to finish 3rd after the first phase with 23 points from 12 games, qualifying for the Championship Phase again. The team again managed only 1 win in the second stage, ending up on 5th position in the final table with 28 points from 18 matches. Kurtis Guthrie was the top-scorer with 13 goals. Ed Engelkes left the club at the end of the season.

==== 2022/23 ====
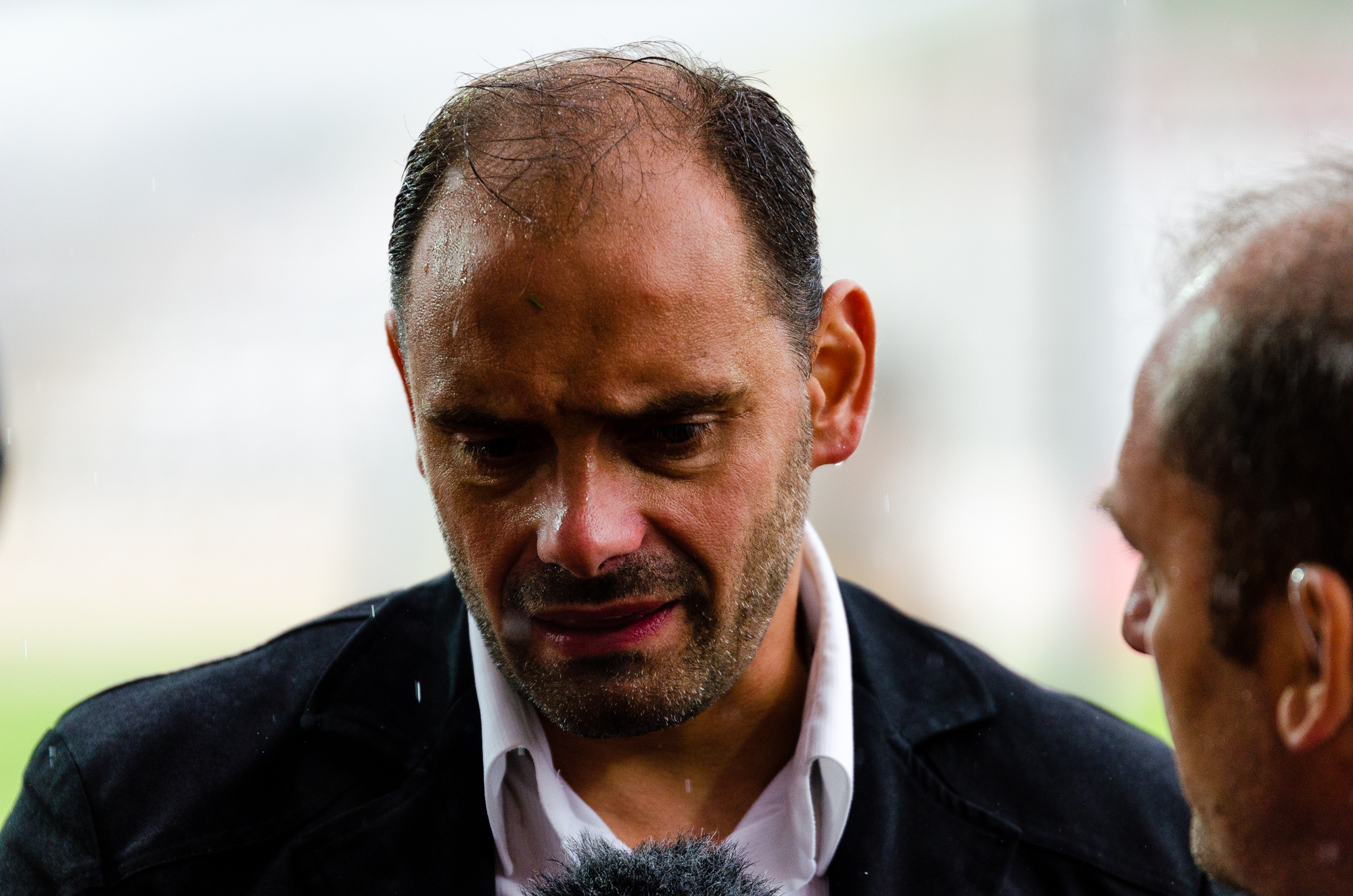
Staikos Vergetis led the club from 2022 to 2024, winning I-League and sealing promotion to the Indian Super League.

In August 2022, Staikos Vergetis was appointed as the new head coach of Roundglass Punjab FC. After winning 4–0 against Rajasthan United on 4 March 2023, the club ensued their I-League title, gaining promotion to the Indian Super League for the first time. They ended the season with 52 points in 22 league matches.

=== Indian Super League (2023–present) ===
==== 2023/24 ====
Roundglass Punjab FC later participated in the 2023 Indian Super Cup. Punjab began their 2023–24 season campaign on 23 September, in a 3–1 away defeat to Mohun Bagan, in which Luka Majcen scored club's first ever ISL goal. They secured first league point on 6 October, in an 1–1 tie with NorthEast United, in their first home match at the Jawaharlal Nehru Stadium in Delhi. On 19 December, French playmaker Madih Talal scored a goal, gave Punjab their historic first match win in the Super League as they defeated Chennaiyin by 1–0 at home. The club achieved their first away win later on 12 February 2024, defeating Kerala Blasters 3–1 in Kochi. The club registered their biggest win on 10 April defeating East Bengal 4–1, ended the league campaign with 24 points in 22 matches.

==== 2024/25 ====
In the 2024–25 Indian Super League, Punjab ended their regular season campaign in tenth place, gaining 28 points. On 22 April, the club defeated previous season's runners-up side Odisha 3–0 in Super Cup and reached quarter-finals.

== Crest, colours & kits ==
Punjab FC's home kit primarily features a vibrant orange base, often paired with black or white accents. The away kit typically comes in white with orange or black highlights, maintaining consistency with the home kit while offering a fresh look. The club's third kit may feature a contrasting color, such as navy blue, providing variety while staying aligned with the team's core colors.

Former club crest (2020–2025)

=== Kit manufacturers and shirt sponsors ===
Period	Kit manufacturer	Shirt sponsor
2020–21	T10 Sports	Roundglass
2021–22	SIX5SIX	Roundglass
2022–24	T10 Sports	Roundglass
2024–26	Shiv Naresh	DafaNews
2026–27	Shiv Naresh	Roundglass Living

== Stadiums ==
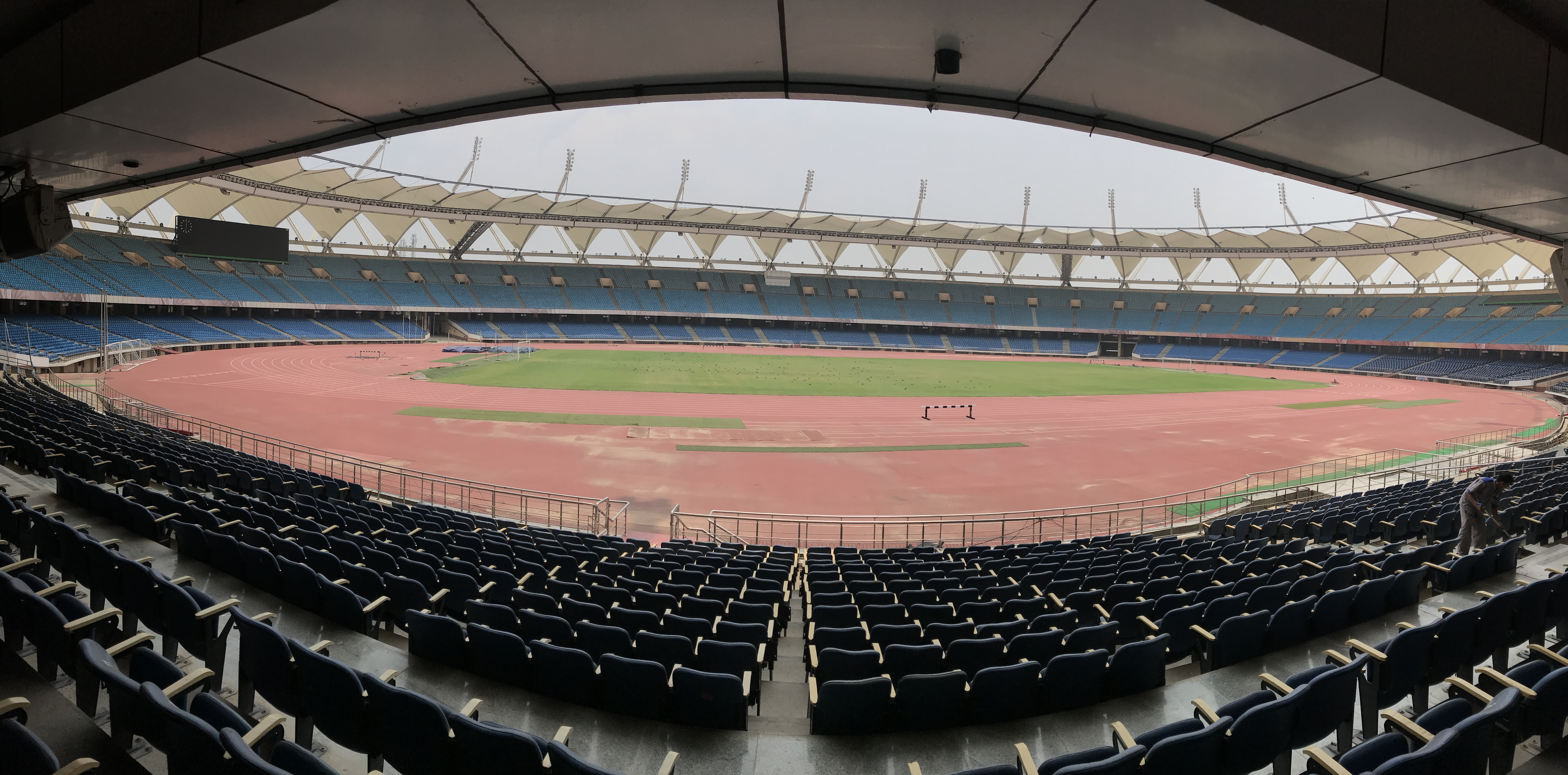
Jawaharlal Nehru Stadium, the official home ground of Punjab FC in the Indian Super League.

In September 2023, Punjab FC officially confirmed Jawaharlal Nehru Stadium in Delhi as their home venue for the 2023–24 Indian Super League.

Previously, Punjab FC played at the Tau Devi Lal Stadium in the I-League. The stadium has a capacity of 12,000 spectators. The club also has used Guru Nanak Stadium as their home ground.

In July 2026, Khalsa University in Amritsar, in collaboration with the Roundglass Foundation, laid the foundation stone for a proposed sports complex featuring a FIFA-standard football ground. The project is funded by the Roundglass Foundation, which is associated with Roundglass Sports, the organisation that owns the club.

== Players ==
=== First-team squad ===
As of 21 October 2026

Note: Flags indicate national team as defined under FIFA eligibility rules; some limited exceptions apply. Players may hold more than one non-FIFA nationality.

No.	Pos.	Nation	Player
1	GK	IND	Arshdeep Singh
2	DF	IND	Muhammad Uvais
3	DF	IND	Bijoy Varghese
4	DF	IND	Nikhil Prabhu (captain)
5	DF	CMR	Patrick Bahanack
6	MF	IND	Ricky Shabong
8	MF	IND	Mohammad Inam
10	FW	ESP	Alfred Planas
11	FW	BRA	Diego Raposo
12	DF	IND	Khaiminthang Lhungdim
14	FW	IND	Vishal Yadav
17	FW	IND	Muhammad Suhail F
18	MF	IND	Bishu Sharma
19	MF	IND	Manglenthang Kipgen

No.	Pos.	Nation	Player
21	FW	IND	Singamayum Shami
22	MF	IND	Laishram Rishikanta Meitei
23	FW	IND	Bikash Singh Sagolsem
27	DF	IND	Karish Soram
28	FW	CMR	Raphaël Messi Bouli
31	MF	IND	Leon Augustine
40	MF	IND	Arshvir Singh
65	MF	MTQ	Mickaël Malsa
66	DF	IND	Ngarin Shaiza
74	DF	IND	Suresh Meitei
78	GK	IND	Muheet Shabir
91	FW	IND	Gurkirat Singh
99	FW	IND	Konsam Sanathoi Singh

=== Out on loan ===
Note: Flags indicate national team as defined under FIFA eligibility rules; some limited exceptions apply. Players may hold more than one non-FIFA nationality.

No.	Pos.	Nation	Player

== Personnel ==
=== Current Technical Staff ===
Position	Name
Head coach	(Greece) Pavlos Dermitzakis
Assistant coach	(Greece) Konstantinos Katsaras
Indian Assistant coach	(India) Sankarlal Chakraborty
Goalkeeping Coach	
Strength & Conditioning Coach	(Greece) Giannis Papaioannou
Team Manager	(India) Kaustuv Kashyap
Football Director	(Greece) Nikolaos Topoliatis
Technical Director - Head of Youth Development	(Italy) Giuseppe Cristaldi

== Records and statistics ==
=== Overall Performance ===
Season	League				Super Cup	Durand Cup	Continental	
Season	League	No. of teams	Position	Play-offs	Super Cup	Durand Cup	Competition	Position
2020–21	I-League	11	4th	—	—	—	DNQ	
2021–22	I-League	13	5th	—	—	DNP	DNQ	
2022–23	I-League	12	1st ▲	—	Group Stage	DNP	DNQ	
2023–24	ISL	12	8th	DNQ	Group Stage	Group Stage	DNQ	
2024–25	ISL	13	10th	DNQ	Quarterfinals	Quarterfinals	DNQ	
2025–26	ISL	14	6th	—	Semifinals	Group Stage	DNQ	
2026–27	ISL	14				DNP	DNQ	

=== League statistics ===
As of 31 October 2026

Season	Division								Top scorer	
Season	Division	Position	P	W	D	L	GF	GA	Player	Goals
2020–21	I-League	4th	15	6	4	5	18	15	(Bhutan) Chencho Gyeltshen	7
2021–22	I-League	5th	18	8	4	6	33	29	(England) Kurtis Guthrie	13
2022–23	I-League	1st	22	16	4	2	45	16	(Slovenia) Luka Majcen	16
2023–24	ISL	8th	22	6	6	10	28	35	(Slovenia) Luka Majcen (Colombia) Wilmar Jordán	8
2024–25	ISL	10th	24	8	4	12	34	38	(Slovenia) Luka Majcen	10
2025–26	ISL	6th	13	6	4	3	18	12	(Nigeria) Effiong Nsungusi	7
2026–27	ISL		4	2	1	1	7	6	(Cameroon) Raphael Messi-Bouli	3

=== Managerial record ===
As of the match played on 21 May 2026

Name	Nationality	From	To	P	W	D	L	GF	GA	Win%	Ref.
Curtis Fleming	Ireland	15 June 2020	23 April 2021	15	6	4	5	18	15	40.00	
Ashley Westwood	England	21 July 2021	23 March 2022	6	3	2	1	14	8	50.00	
Ed Engelkes	Netherlands	23 March 2022	31 May 2022	12	5	2	5	19	21	41.67	
Staikos Vergetis	Greece	8 August 2022	12 June 2024	52	23	13	16	76	60	44.23	
Panagiotis Dilmperis	Greece	29 June 2024	25 June 2026	49	21	9	19	84	70	42.86	
Pavlos Dermitzakis	Greece	14 July 2026	present	7	4	2	1	15	6	57.14	

== Notable players ==
=== Internationally capped players ===
The following Roundglass Punjab FC players have been capped at senior/youth international level. Years in brackets indicate their spells at the club.

- (Bhutan) Chencho Gyeltshen (2020–2021, 2023)
- (India) Hormipam Ruivah (2020–2021)
- (India) Aakash Sangwan (2020–2022)
- (England) (Jersey) Kurtis Guthrie (2021–2022)
- (India) Sumeet Passi (2021–2022)
- (Bosnia and Herzegovina) Adnan Šećerović (2022–2023)
- (Serbia) Aleksandar Ignjatović (2022–2023)
- (India) Daniel Lalhlimpuia (2022–2024)
- (Nepal) Kiran Chemjong (2022–2024)
- (India) Abhishek Singh Tekcham (2022–2025)
- (Slovenia) Luka Majcen (2022–2025)
- (India) Mashoor Shereef (2023–2024)
- (India) Amarjit Singh Kiyam (2023–2024)
- (India) Nikhil Prabhu (2023–)
- (Croatia) Filip Mrzljak (2024–2025)
- (Norway) Mushaga Bakenga (2024)
- (Bosnia and Herzegovina) Asmir Suljić (2024–2025)
- (India) Muhammad Uvais (2025–)

=== Foreign players ===
Season	Player 1	Player 2	Player 3	Player 4	Player 5	Player 6	Other player(s)
2020–21	(Bhutan) Chencho Gyeltshen (LW)	(Senegal) Baba Diawara (ST)	(Spain) Joseba Beitia (CM)	(Nepal) Kiran Chemjong (GK)			
2021–22	(England) Josef Yarney (CB)	(England) (Jersey) Kurtis Guthrie (ST)	(Spain) Joseba Beitia (CM)	(Australia) Travis Major (CAM)			
2022–23	(Bosnia and Herzegovina) Adnan Šećerović (DM)	(Argentina) Juan Nellar (CM)	(Serbia) Aleksandar Ignjatović (CB)	(Slovenia) Luka Majcen (ST)	(Spain) Juan Mera (CAM)	(Nepal) Kiran Chemjong (GK)	(Bhutan) Chencho Gyeltshen (LW)
2023–24	(Colombia) Wilmar Jordán (ST)	(France) (Morocco) Madih Talal (CAM)	(Greece) Dimitrios Chatzisaiias (CB)	(Slovenia) Luka Majcen (ST)	(Spain) Juan Mera (CAM)	(Nepal) Kiran Chemjong (GK)	
2024–25	(Argentina) Ezequiel Pulga Vidal (CAM)	(Bosnia and Herzegovina) Asmir Suljić (LW)	(Croatia) Filip Mrzljak (DM)	(Slovenia) Luka Majcen (ST)	(Croatia) Ivan Novoselec (CB)	(Norway) Mushaga Bakenga (ST)	(Greece) Petros Giakoumakis (ST)
2025-26	(Bosnia and Herzegovina) Samir Zeljković (DM)	(Brazil) Pablo Santos (CB)	(Nigeria) Bede Osuji Amarachi (ST)	(Nigeria) Effiong Nsungusi Jr. (ST)	(Spain) Dani Ramírez (CAM)		
2026–27	(Brazil) (Portugal) Diego Raposo (LW)	(Spain) Alfred Planas Moya (RW)	(Cameroon) Patrick Bahanack (CB)	(Cameroon) Raphaël Messi Bouli (ST)	(Martinique) (France) Mickaël Malsa (DM)		

== Honours ==
=== Domestic ===
- I-League (Note: From 2017–18 season until 2021–22 season, I-League and Indian Super League shared joint top flight status. Following the Indian football roadmap, Indian Super League became the sole top-tier league in the country from 2022–23, and I-League became the second tier.)
  - Champions (1): 2022–23

== Other department(s) ==
=== Football: Reserves and academy ===
Club's youth section was at first incorporated from Minerva Academy players and started participating in various age-group competitions of the Hero Youth League. In December 2023, club's football academy gained an 'elite category' accreditation by the All India Football Federation.

Reserve side won its first Punjab State Super Football League title in 2022–23. Managed by coach Sankarlal Chakraborty, the club clinched 2024 Reliance Foundation Development League title defeating East Bengal in final, and qualified for the PL Next Gen Cup. Club's under-17 team won Administrator's Challenge Cup title in Chandigarh in 2022.

Apart from the reserve and academy sides, the club operates 15 grassroot football centres across Punjab including Pandori Ran Singh and Bibipura in Tarn Taran, Dhilwan in Kapurthala, Jaito Sarja in Gurdaspur, Sant Baba Hari Singh Model School in Mahalpur and Mustabaad in Fategharh Sahib, with plans to expand to 25 by the end of 2025.

==== Honours ====
- Punjab Super League
  - Champions (2): 2022–23‡, 2025-26‡
- JSW U-18 Youth Cup
  - Champions (1): 2022†
- JSW U-13 Youth Cup
  - Champions (1): 2023†
  - Runners-up (1): 2022†
- KBN Youth Cup
  - Champions (1): 2022†
- Administrator's Challenge Cup
  - Champions (1): 2022‡
- Dream Sports Championship
  - Champions (2): 2024, 2025
- Premier League Next Gen Cup
  - Third place (1): 2024
- AIFF U-17 Elite Youth League
  - Champions (1): 2025

^{‡} Reserve team
^{†} Academy team

=== Women's team ===
The club has a women's team that competed in the Punjab Women's League in 2026.

== See also ==
- List of football clubs in India
