= Pramveer Singh =

Indian footballer (born 2007)

Personal information
- Full name: Pramveer Ranbir Singh
- Date of birth: 20 June 2007 (age 19)
- Place of birth: Behlba, Rohtak district, Haryana, India
- Height: 1.85 m (6 ft 1 in)
- Position: Centre-back

Team information
- Current team: NorthEast United
- Number: 4

Youth career
- 2017–2024: Punjab B

Senior career*
Years	Team	Apps	(Gls)
2023–2024	Punjab B	12	(4)
2024–2026	Punjab	19	(0)
2026–	NorthEast United	5	(0)

International career^{‡}
2023	India U17	1	(0)
2024	India U20	5	(0)
2025	India U23	5	(0)
2026–	India	5	(0)
- * Club domestic league appearances and goals as of 5 November 2026 ‡ National team caps and goals as of 22:00, 6 October 2026 (UTC)

Pramveer Ranbir Singh (born 20 June 2007) is an Indian professional footballer who plays as a defender for Indian Super League club NorthEast United and the Indian national team.

== Early life ==
Born in Behlba village in Rohtak, Haryana. Pramveer began playing football in his village aged 9. Pramveer's parents were initially reluctant for him to pursue football, as they did not see a future for him in the sport. However, following a successful trial in 2017 with Minerva Punjab (now Punjab FC), he was taken into the club's academy.

== Career ==
=== Youth career ===
After working his way up the academy teams, Pramveer made his debut for the Punjab U17 team at age 16 in the 2023–24 Indian Youth League against Bunkerhill U17 on 17 December 2023, coming off the bench in the 81st minute to secure a 2–0 win for his side.

Despite not playing in the club's next match against BBFC U17, Pramveer started against Delhi FC U17, and scored in the 59th minute to secure a 3–1 win. He started and scored in the club's subsequent match as well, scoring in the 33rd minute against Sudeva Delhi U17 in a 2–2 draw.

Pramveer played three more games, against Sudeva, Delhi FC, and BBFS, scoring one more goal as Punjab finished top of their group.

Following this, Pramveer was then called up to the Punjab U21 team for RFDL 2024. There, he played every minute in all their group matches as they topped Group D, even scoring against Mumbai City U21. He then also played the full match in the semifinal against Bengaluru U21 and final against East Bengal U21, as Punjab won the tournament.

=== Club career ===
Pramveer was first named in Punjab's ISL matchday squad on 31 October 2025 against Chennaiyin, being named on the bench. However, Pramveer did not play the match.

Pramveer made his ISL debut on 26 December 2025 away against Mohun Bagan, starting the match and playing 83 minutes in a 3–1 loss for the Shers. This start, though, made him the youngest-ever starter in ISL history, starting the game at the age of 17 years and 189 days.

Following this appearance, Pramveer became a rotation player, making 10 appearances throughout the season.

In the Super Cup, Pramveer played the full 90 minutes in Punjab's 3–0 win against Odisha FC in the round of 16, as well as in the club's quarter-final loss against Goa.

=== International career ===
==== India Under-17 ====
Pramveer was called up to the India U-17 squad for the first time for two friendlies against Qatar U-17. He made his debut in the first match on 25 February 2023, aged 15 years, 8 months, and 5 days. He played the full 90 minutes, as India lost 3–1. Pramveer played full 90 minutes in the second match as well on 28 February 2023, helping India keep a clean sheet as the team secured a 3–0 win.

Pramveer was called up as part of India U-17 head coach Bibiano Fernandes's 2023 AFC U-17 Asian Cup squad. He made his debut in India's first group match on 17 June 2023 against Vietnam U-17, playing the full 90 minutes in a 1–1 draw. He played the full 90 minutes in the next game as well, a 1–0 loss to Uzbekistan U-17, on 20 June 2023. Pramveer did not play India's final group game against Japan U-17, which ended in an 8–4 loss. This loss meant India finished third in the group, and were knocked out of the tournament.

==== India Under-23 ====
On 16 June 2025, Pramveer was named as part of India U-23 head coach Naushad Moosa's India U-23 squad friendly matches against Tajikistan U-23 and Kyrgyzstan U-23. Pramveer was the youngest member of the squad, aged 17 years 11 months 27 days.

Pramveer made his U23 debut on 18 June 2025, playing the full 90 minutes at centre-back, as India U23s lost 3–2 to Tajikistan U23s.

==== Senior team ====
On 5 October 2025, senior national team head coach Khalid Jamil announced Pramveer as part of the 23-man squad for the 2027 AFC Asian Cup qualification away match against Singapore.

== Career statistics ==
=== Club ===
As of 16 September 2025

Club	Season	League			Cup		AFC		Total	
Club	Season	Division	Apps	Goals	Apps	Goals	Apps	Goals	Apps	Goals
Punjab	2024-25	Indian Super League	10	0	2 (Note: Appearance(s) in Super Cup)	0	—		12	0
Career total			10	0	2	0	0	0	12	0

=== International ===
As of 6 October 2026

National team	Year	Apps	Goals
India	2026	5	0
Total		5	0
