= Mohammad Inam =

Indian footballer (born 2000)

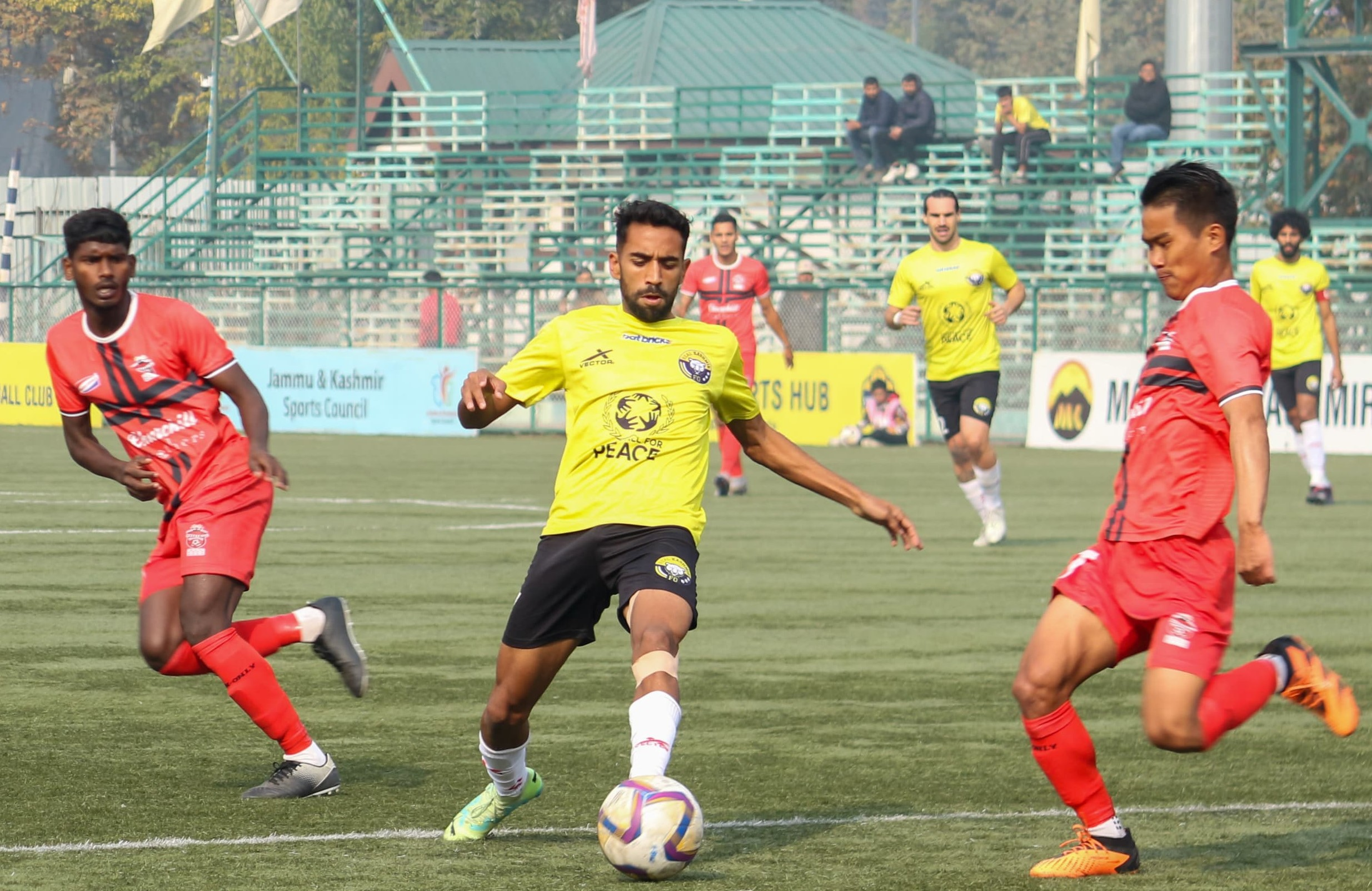
- Mohammad Inam playing for Real Kashmir

Personal information
- Date of birth: 27 October 2000 (age 26)
- Place of birth: Srinagar, Jammu and Kashmir, India
- Height: 1.73 m (5 ft 8 in)
- Position: Midfielder

Team information
- Current team: Punjab

Youth career
- Real Kashmir

Senior career*
Years	Team	Apps	(Gls)
2021	Lonestar Kashmir	6	(0)
2021–2022	Delhi	5	(0)
2022–2023	Real Kashmir	1	(0)
2022-2023	Delhi	6	(1)
2023–2024	Downtown Heroes	0	(0)
2023–2024	→ Real Kashmir (loan)	18	(2)
2024–2026	Real Kashmir	34	(4)
2026–	Punjab	1	(0)
- * Club domestic league appearances and goals as of 14 October 2026

Mohammad Inam (born 27 October 2000) is an Indian professional footballer who plays as a midfielder for Indian Super League club Punjab.

== Career ==
Born and brought up in Jammu & Kashmir, Inam started playing football at the age of 10. At the age of 15, Inam was invited by All India Football Federation for Asian Football Confederation U-16 trials. He gave the performance while representing Real Kashmir FC in U-15 years.

In September 2021, Mohammad Inam signed for Delhi FC. He featured a total of 5 matches in the I-League Qualifiers. He also featured Delhi FC in the 2021 Durand Cup.
