= Pablo Santos (footballer) =

Brazilian footballer

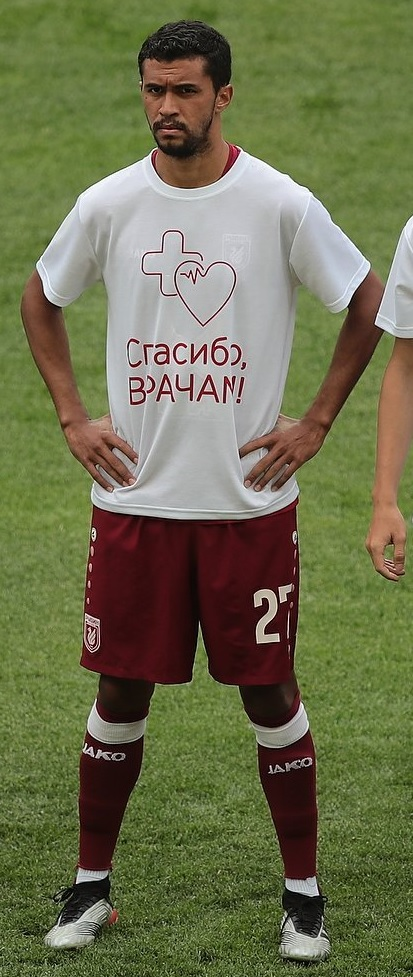
- Pablo with Rubin Kazan in 2020

Personal information
- Full name: Pablo Renan dos Santos
- Date of birth: 18 March 1992 (age 34)
- Place of birth: Tomé-Açu, Brazil
- Height: 1.85 m (6 ft 1 in)
- Position: Centre back

Senior career*
Years	Team	Apps	(Gls)
2012–2017	Paysandu	124	(8)
2017–2018	Marítimo	25	(1)
2018–2022	Braga	30	(2)
2020	→ Rubin Kazan (loan)	9	(0)
2020–2021	→ Hatayspor (loan)	36	(1)
2021–2022	→ Moreirense (loan)	14	(1)
2022–2023	Al-Raed	17	(1)
2024–2025	Noah	13	(4)
2025–2026	Punjab	10	(0)
- * Club domestic league appearances and goals as of 21 May 2026

Pablo Renan dos Santos (born 18 March 1992), sometimes known simply as Pablo, is a Brazilian professional footballer who plays as a defender.

== Football career ==
Born in Tomé-Açu, Pará, Santos began his career at Paysandu in his native state. He played six national campaigns for the club, between Campeonato Brasileiro Série B and Série C.

On 23 June 2017, he moved to Portuguese club Marítimo, on the recommendation of Raul Silva of the same state. He played 25 total games in his one season on the island of Madeira, and scored in their 3–2 home Primeira Liga win over Vitória de Guimarães on 24 February 2018.

Santos moved to Braga in the same league on 9 July 2018, on a five-year deal. In his first league game on 19 August he scored the opening goal away to Santa Clara as his new team led 3–0 at half-time, but drew the game 3–3.

On 30 January 2020, he joined Russian Premier League club Rubin Kazan on loan with an option to buy. He left Rubin upon the end of his loan term on 23 July 2020.

On 19 August 2020, Santos joined Turkish Süper Lig side Hatayspor on a season-long loan deal.

On 28 August 2021, he moved on loan to Moreirense for the 2021–22 season.

On 25 July 2022, Santos joined Saudi Pro League club Al-Raed.

On 30 January 2024, Armenian Premier League club Noah announced the signing of Santos. On 18 January 2025, Noah announced that Santos had left the club at the end of his contract.

On 21 October 2025, Santos joined Indian Super League club Punjab FC.
