= Bikash Singh Sagolsem =

Indian footballer (born 2001)

Bikash Singh
Personal information
- Full name: Bikash Singh Sagolsem
- Date of birth: 5 March 2001 (age 25)
- Place of birth: Manipur, India
- Height: 1.77 m (5 ft 10 in)
- Position: Left winger

Team information
- Current team: Punjab
- Number: 23

Youth career
- East Bengal U16
- 2017–2020: East Bengal U18

Senior career*
Years	Team	Apps	(Gls)
2021–2023	TRAU	21	(3)
2023–2025	Kerala Blasters	0	(0)
2023–2025	→ Mohammedan (loan)	43	(2)
2025–2025	Punjab	0	(0)
- * Club domestic league appearances and goals as of 16:30, 10 March 2025 (UTC)

Bikash Singh Sagolsem (Meitei: Sagolsem Bikash Singh, born 5 March 2001) is an Indian professional footballer who plays as a forward for Indian Super League club Punjab.

== Early life and career ==
Bikash was born in Manipur on 5 March 2001.

He was a youth product of East Bengal academy. He also played for their under-18 team till 2020.

=== 2021–2023 - TRAU FC ===
On 28 June 2021, Bikash was signed by I-League club TRAU. He made 21 appearances for the club, scoring three goals.

=== 2023–present - Kerala Blasters FC ===
On 26 June 2023, Indian Super League club Kerala Blasters announced that they have signed Bikash on a two-year contract till 2025, with an option to extend. Then, he was immediately loaned out to I-League club Mohammedan.

==== 2023–2024 - Mohammedan SC (loan) ====
On 29 June 2023, I-League club Mohammedan signed Bikash on a one-year loan deal from Kerala Blasters. He made 22 appearances for the club, scoring two goals and giving three assists. In September 2024, Kerala Blasters announced that Bikash's loan to Mohammedan has been extended further one more year.

== Career statistics ==
=== Club ===
As of 24 April 2025

Club	Season	League			Cup		AFC		Total	
Club	Season	Division	Apps	Goals	Apps	Goals	Apps	Goals	Apps	Goals
TRAU	2022–23	I-League	21	3	1 (Note: Appearance(s) in Super Cup)	0	–		22	3
Kerala Blasters	2023–24	Indian Super League	0	0	0	0	–		0	0
Mohammedan (loan)	2023–24	I-League	22	2	3 (Note: Appearance(s) in Durand Cup)	0	–		25	2
Mohammedan (loan)	2024–25	Indian Super League	21	0	1	0	–		22	0
Mohammedan (loan)	Total		43	2	4	0	0	0	47	2
Punjab	2025–26	Indian Super League	0	0	0	0	–		0	0
Career total			64	5	5	0	0	0	69	5
