= Muhammad Suhail F =

Indian footballer (born 2006)

Muhammad Suhail
Personal information
- Full name: Muhammad Suhail F.
- Date of birth: 12 September 2006 (age 20)
- Place of birth: Kerala, India
- Position: Forward

Team information
- Current team: Punjab
- Number: 11

Youth career
- –2019: Marhaba
- 2019–2024: Punjab

Senior career*
Years	Team	Apps	(Gls)
2024–	Punjab	19	(0)

International career^{‡}
2025–	India U23	5	(2)
2026–	India	1	(0)
- * Club domestic league appearances and goals as of 27 May 2026 ‡ National team caps and goals as of 12 November 2026

Muhammad Suhail F. (born 12 September 2006) is an Indian professional footballer who plays as a forward for Indian Super League club Punjab and the India national team.

== Career ==
Suhail first played for his local club, Marhaba, until he attended Punjab trials in Coimbatore at age 12, where he got selected. Initially, Suhail played as a centre-back, but was later shifted to a striker in the Under-13s, where he played for three years. However, when the RFDL started, Suhail was asked to play as a winger, and has remained a winger since.

Suhail made his senior debut for Punjab in the 2024 Durand Cup against Mumbai City II, coming on as a substitute for Leon Augustine in an eventual 3–0 win for the Shers.

Suhail's Indian Super League debut came on 26 December 2024 away against Mohun Bagan, coming on as a late substitute for Luka Majcen in an eventual 3–1 loss for Punjab.

Suhail's first goal contribution came on 6 March 2025, away against Hyderabad. In the 41st minute, Suhail's shot from long distance was deflected into his own net by Hyderabad defender Alex Saji. While the goal was classed as an own goal, Suhail was credited with the assist. This made him the third-youngest player to get an ISL assist, at 18 years and 175 days old. The match eventually ended 3–1 to Punjab.

== Career statistics ==
=== Club ===
As of 27 May 2026

Club	Season	League			Cup		Other		AFC		Total	
Club	Season	Division	Apps	Goals	Apps	Goals	Apps	Goals	Apps	Goals	Apps	Goals
Punjab	2024-25	Indian Super League	13	0	1 (Note: Appearance(s) in Durand Cup)	0	2 (Note: Appearance(s) in Super Cup)	0	—		16	0
Punjab	2025-26	Indian Super League	6	0	3	0	3	0	—		12	0
Career total			19	0	4	0	5	0	0	0	28	0

== Honours ==
India

- SAFF Championship: 2026
