= Muheet Shabir =

Indian footballer (born 2001)

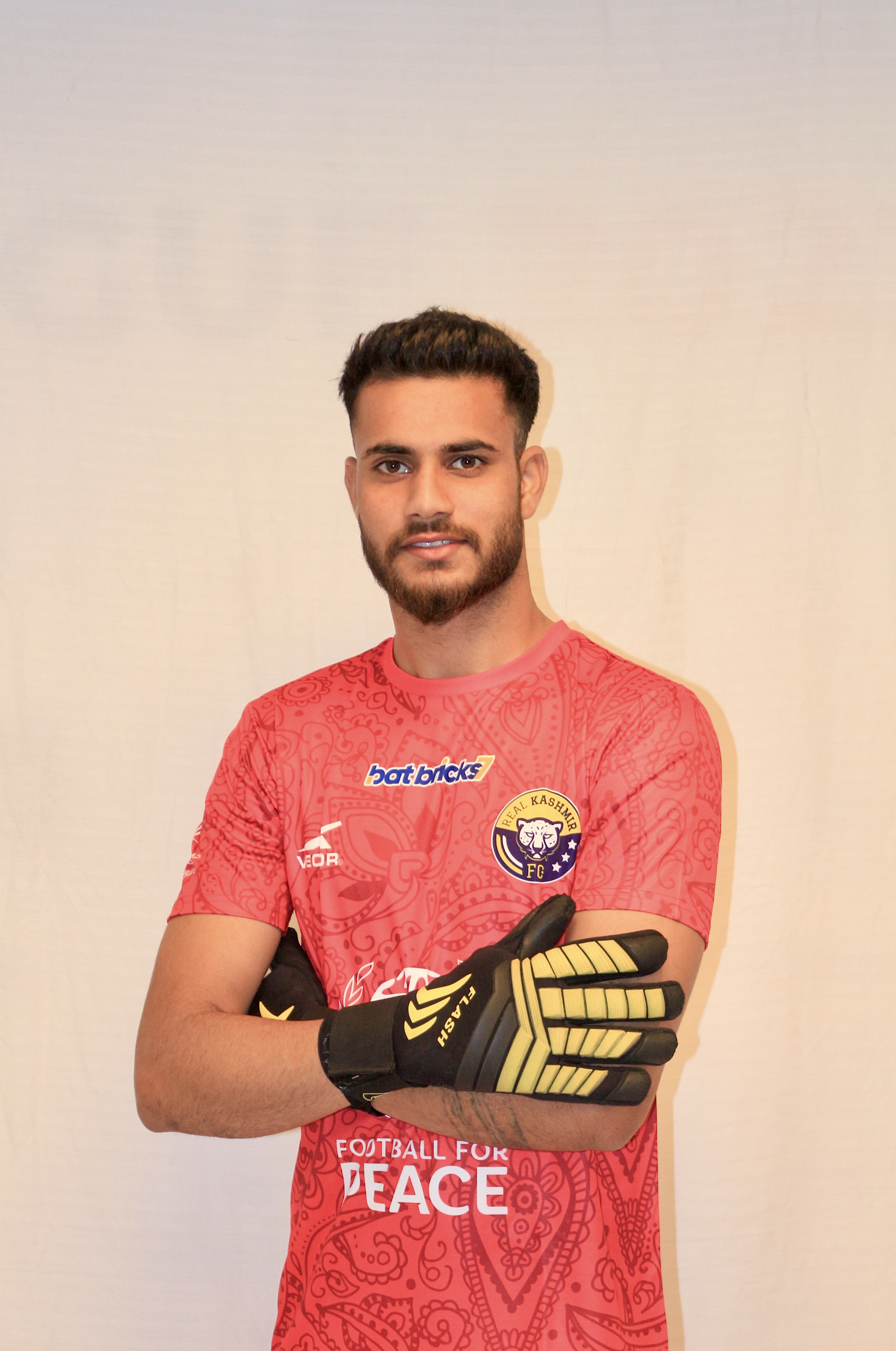
- Muheet with Real Kashmir FC in 2023

Personal information
- Full name: Muheet Shabir Khan
- Date of birth: 7 August 2001 (age 25)
- Place of birth: Srinagar, Jammu and Kashmir, India
- Height: 1.97 m (6 ft 6 in)
- Position: Goalkeeper

Team information
- Current team: Punjab

Youth career
- Kerala Blasters

Senior career*
| Years | Team | Apps | (Gls) |
| 2021–2022 | Kerala Blasters B | 0 | (0) |
| 2023–2024 | Real Kashmir | 22 | (0) |
| 2024– | Punjab | 0 | (0) |
- * Club domestic league appearances and goals as of 12:17, 30 March 2022 (UTC)

Muheet Shabir Khan (born 7 August 2001), is an Indian professional footballer who plays as a goalkeeper for Indian Super League club Punjab.

== Career ==
Muheet began his career at the Kerala Blasters FC Academy, where he was scouted through their youth setup, the KBFC Young Blasters. He progressed to the club's Reserve squad but did not make it to the senior team. Later, he joined the I-League club Real Kashmir FC, where he showcased his skills and earned the prestigious Golden Glove award for the 2023–24 season. This achievement led to his return to the Indian Super League, as he signed with Punjab FC for the 2024–25 season.

== Honors ==
Individual

Real Kashmir

  - I League Golden Glove: 2023-24
