= Bede Osuji =

Nigerian footballer (born 1996)

Personal information
- Full name: Bede Amarachi Osuji
- Date of birth: 21 January 1996 (age 30)
- Place of birth: Nigeria
- Position: Winger

Team information
- Current team: Aluminij
- Number: 11

Youth career
- 2013–2014: Gorica

Senior career*
Years	Team	Apps	(Gls)
2013–2020	Gorica	137	(23)
2014	→ Brda (loan)	11	(3)
2015	→ Tolmin (loan)	12	(6)
2020–2021	Hapoel Ra'anana	25	(2)
2021–2024	Koper	81	(19)
2024–2025	Manisa	28	(4)
2025–2026	Punjab	13	(3)
2026–	Aluminij	5	(4)
- * Club domestic league appearances and goals as of 21 August 2026

Bede Amarachi Osuji (born 21 January 1996) is a Nigerian professional footballer who plays as a winger for Slovenian PrvaLiga club Aluminij.

== Honours ==
Gorica

- Slovenian Cup: 2013–14

Koper

- Slovenian Cup: 2021–22
