= Ayush Chhetri =

Indian footballer (born 2003)

Personal information
- Full name: Ayush Dev Chhetri
- Date of birth: 16 April 2003 (age 23)
- Place of birth: Aizawl, Mizoram, India
- Height: 1.75 m (5 ft 9 in)
- Position: Defensive midfielder

Team information
- Current team: Chennaiyin

Youth career
- 2019–2020: Aizawl

Senior career*
Years	Team	Apps	(Gls)
2020–2022	Aizawl	10	(3)
2022–2026	Goa	66	(1)
2026–	Chennaiyin	3	(0)

International career^{‡}
2023–2025	India U23	10	(1)
2025–	India	3	(0)
- * Club domestic league appearances and goals as of 26 October 2026 ‡ National team caps and goals as of 22:33, 15 November 2025 (UTC)

Ayush Dev Chhetri (born 16 April 2003) is an Indian professional footballer who plays as a defensive midfielder for Indian Super League club Chennaiyin and the India national team.

== Club career ==
=== Aizawl ===
Born in Aizawl, Chhetri was a youth product of his local club Aizawl FC. He was promoted to the first team in 2020 at the age of 17 and made his senior debut in I-League.

=== Goa FC ===
On 22 July 2022, he signed for Indian Super League side Goa, signing a three-year contract. In his first season with the club, he gained a starter spot in appeared in 20 out of 22 league games.

== International career ==
=== India U23 ===
In September 2023, Chhetri was named in India U23's squad for the 2022 Asian Games. He appeared in the first two group stage games as India got knocked out in the round of 16.

On 16 June 2025, Chhetri was named as part of India U23's squad friendly matches against Tajikistan U23 and Kyrgyzstan U23. On 18 June 2025, he was sent off for a second yellow card early in the second half of a friendly against Tajikistan U23 in Tursunzoda. India U23 later lost 3–2 after conceding twice in stoppage time.

=== India ===
Chhetri made his debut for India national team on 19 March 2025 in a friendly against Maldives.

== Career statistics ==
=== Club ===
As of 22 March 2026

Club	Season	League			National Cup		League Cup		AFC		Total	
Club	Season	Division	Apps	Goals	Apps	Goals	Apps	Goals	Apps	Goals	Apps	Goals
Aizawl	2021–22	I-League	10	3	–		–		–		10	3
Goa	2022–23	Indian Super League	20	0	1 (Note: Appearance(s) in Super Cup)	0	3 (Note: Appearance(s) in Durand Cup)	0	–		24	0
Goa	2023–24	Indian Super League	11	0	3	0	3	0	–		17	0
Goa	2024–25	Indian Super League	23	1	3	0	–		–		26	1
Goa	2025–26	Indian Super League	6	0	4	0	–		5 (Note: Appearance(s) in AFC Champions League Two)	0	15	0
Goa	Total		60	1	11	0	6	0	5	0	82	1
Total			70	4	11	0	6	0	5	0	92	4

=== International ===
As of 4 June 2025

National team	Year	Apps	Goals
India	2025	3	0
Total		3	0
