= Manglenthang Kipgen =

Indian footballer (born 2005)

Personal information
- Date of birth: 3 June 2005 (age 21)
- Place of birth: Gamnomphai, Manipur, India
- Position: Midfielder

Team information
- Current team: Punjab
- Number: 17

Youth career
- 2020–21: FC Madras
- 2021–24: Punjab

Senior career*
Years	Team	Apps	(Gls)
2022–	Punjab	12	(0)

International career^{‡}
2023–24	India U20	8	(5)
2025–	India U23		
2026–	India	4	(1)
Medal record
Men's football
Representing India
SAFF Championship
Winner	2026 Bangladesh
- * Club domestic league appearances and goals as of 15:30, 24 May 2025 (UTC) ‡ National team caps and goals as of 17:45, 5 November 2026 (UTC)

Manglenthang Kipgen (born 3 June 2005) is an Indian professional footballer who plays as a midfielder for the Indian Super League club Punjab.

== Club career ==
Kipgen started playing football at a very young age of six. He used to play barefoot in his school. In 2020, he joined FC Madras at the age of 15. He remained there for one season before joining Punjab's youth team. In 2022, he played his first competitive league matches in the 2022–23 U-17 Youth Cup. However, he played 3 matches for the senior team of Punjab at the 2022–23 I-League, then second tier of Indian football league system. He won this edition of I-League with Punjab, his first senior championship title. For the next season, he played for both youth as well as senior team. He played six matches for the youth team at the 2023 Development League and scored 2 goals.

Following the championship of 2022–23 I-League, Punjab was promoted to the Indian Super League (ISL), the top-tier league of India. He made his ISL debut against Chennaiyin on 29 October 2023. He also represented the club in Super Cup and Durand Cup. In 2024, he played in the Next Gen Cup and scored highest number of goals for the youth team. He also won the 2024 Development League with the youth team, his first youth championship title.

== International career ==
Kipgen was part of the India under-19 squad that won the 2023 SAFF U-19 Championship. In the final against Pakistan, he scored a brace to help India to win the championship.

In May 2025, India under-23 head coach Naushad Moosa listed Kipgen in the 29-members probable squad for two friendlies that will be held in Tajikistan in June 2025.

== Career statistics ==
=== Club ===
As of 23 May 2025

Appearances and goals by club, season and competition
Club	Season	League			Super Cup		Durand Cup		Continental		Total	
Club	Season	Division	Apps	Goals	Apps	Goals	Apps	Goals	Apps	Goals	Apps	Goal
Punjab	2022–23	I-League	3	0	–		–		–		3	0
Punjab	Total		3	0	–		–		–		3	0
Punjab	2023–24	Indian Super League	4	0	1	0	1	0	0	0	6	0
Punjab	2024–25	Indian Super League	5	0	1	0	0	0	0	0	6	0
Punjab	Total		9	0	2	0	1	0	0	0	12	0
Career total			12	0	2	0	1	0	0	0	15	0

== Honours ==
Club

Punjab FC youth team

- Development League: 2024

Punjab FC

- I-League: 2022–23

National Team

India under-19

- SAFF U-19 Championship: 2023

India

- SAFF Championship: 2026
