= Effiong Nsungusi =

Nigerian professional footballer

Personal information
- Full name: Effiong Nsungusi Junior
- Date of birth: 4 November 1999 (age 27)
- Place of birth: Nigeria
- Height: 1.95 m (6 ft 5 in)
- Position: Striker

Team information
- Current team: East Bengal

Youth career
- 2006–2016: Inter Allies

Senior career*
Years	Team	Apps	(Gls)
2016–2020	Inter Allies	11	(4)
2019–2020	→ HB Køge (loan)	24	(12)
2020–2023	HB Køge	61	(14)
2022–2023	→ Atyrau (loan)	25	(7)
2023–2024	Neftchi Fergana	24	(7)
2024–2025	UTA Arad	6	(0)
2025–2026	Punjab	12	(7)
2026–	East Bengal	0	(0)
- * Club domestic league appearances and goals as of 23:27, 21 May 2026 (UTC)

Effiong Nsungusi Junior (born 4 November 1999) is a Nigerian professional footballer who plays as a forward for Indian Super League club East Bengal.

== Career ==
Nsungusi started his career with Ghanaian club International Allies in January 2018. He played 64 matches and scored 28 goals before leaving the club to join HB Køge.

In February 2024, there was information about the interest of the Neftchi team, a participant of the Uzbekistan Super League. On February 19, he signed a one-year contract with the Fergana team.
