= Panagiotis Dilmperis =

Greek footballer and manager

Personal information
- Full name: Panagiotis Dilmperis
- Date of birth: 28 September 1974 (age 52)
- Place of birth: Thessaloniki, Greece
- Height: 1.93 m (6 ft 4 in)
- Position: Goalkeeper

Team information
- Current team: Mohun Bagan (head coach)

Senior career*
Years	Team	Apps	(Gls)
1998–2006	Iraklis	264	(2)
2006–2010	Agrotikos Asteras	136	(2)

Managerial career
- 2011–2013: Ethnikos Gazoros
- 2013–2014: Agrotikos Asteras
- 2014–2015: Apollon Pontus
- 2015–2016: Agrotikos Asteras
- 2016–2017: Panserraikos
- 2017–2020: Rochester Super 9 Pro
- 2020–2021: Kavala
- 2021–2022: Iraklis Larissa
- 2022–2023: Agrotikos Asteras
- 2023–2024: AE Ermionidas
- 2024–2026: Punjab
- 2026–: Mohun Bagan
- * Club domestic league appearances and goals

Panagiotis Dilmperis (Greek: Παναγιώτης Διλμπέρης; born 28 September 1974) is a Greek professional football manager and former player who is currently the head coach of the Indian Super League club Mohun Bagan.
