= 2023–24 Punjab FC season =

Indian football club season

Punjab FC
2023–24 season
- Director of Football: Nikolaos Topoliatis
- Head coach: (Greece) Staikos Vergetis
- Stadium: Jawaharlal Nehru Stadium Delhi
- Indian Super League: 8th
- Indian Super Cup: Group stage
- Durand Cup: Group stage
- Top goalscorer: League: Wilmar Jordan, Luka Majcen (8 goals); All: Luka Majcen (10 goals)
- Highest home attendance: 5,992 vs Kerala Blasters
- Lowest home attendance: 2,016 vs FC Goa
- Average home league attendance: 3,755
- Biggest win: 4-1 vs East Bengal FC
- Biggest defeat: 0-4 vs Jamshedpur FC
| Home colours | Away colours |
- All statistics correct as of 2 July 2024.

The 2023–24 season is the nineteenth season in Punjab FC's existence, and club's first ever season in the Indian Super League after it was promoted to the league by winning the 2022–23 I-League.

== Personnel ==
=== Current technical staff ===
| Position | Name |
|---|---|
| Head coach | (Greece) Staikos Vergetis |
| Assistant coach | (Greece) Dimitrios Kakkos |
| Goalkeeping coach | (India) Vinay Singh |
| Strength & Conditioning coach | (Greece) Nikolaos Tsagkatakis |
| Team Manager | (India) Kamaldeep Singh |
| Technical Director | (Greece) Nikolaos Topoliatis |
| Team Doctor | (India) Sidak Dhillon |

== Players ==
=== First-team squad ===
Note: Flags indicate national team as defined under FIFA eligibility rules; some limited exceptions apply. Players may hold more than one non-FIFA nationality.

| No. | Pos. | Nation | Player |
|---|---|---|---|
| 1 | GK | IND | Ravi Kumar |
| 2 | DF | IND | Tekcham Abhishek Singh |
| 4 | DF | IND | Nikhil Prabhu |
| 5 | DF | GRE | Dimitrios Chatziisaias |
| 6 | MF | IND | Ricky Shabong |
| 7 | FW | IND | Krishananda Singh |
| 8 | MF | FRA | Madih Talal |
| 9 | FW | COL | Wilmar Jordán |
| 10 | MF | IND | Maheson Singh |
| 11 | MF | IND | Samuel Kynshi |
| 12 | DF | IND | Khaiminthang Lhungdim |
| 14 | FW | ESP | Juan Mera |
| 16 | GK | NEP | Kiran Chemjong |
| 17 | MF | IND | Manglenthang Kipgen |
| 18 | FW | IND | Sweden Fernandes (on loan from Chennaiyin) |
| 19 | FW | IND | Daniel Lalhlimpuia |
| 20 | FW | IND | Ranjeet Pandre |

| No. | Pos. | Nation | Player |
|---|---|---|---|
| 21 | GK | IND | Jaskaranbir Singh |
| 22 | MF | IND | Sahil Tavora (on loan from Hyderabad) |
| 23 | MF | IND | Ashish Pradhan |
| 24 | MF | IND | Prasanth Mohan |
| 30 | MF | IND | Kingsley Fernandes |
| 31 | MF | IND | Leon Augustine |
| 32 | DF | IND | Pramveer Singh |
| 34 | DF | IND | Melroy Assisi |
| 39 | DF | IND | Mohammed Salah |
| 41 | GK | IND | Abujam Penand Singh |
| 45 | DF | IND | Nitesh Darjee |
| 48 | MF | IND | Isaac Vanmalsawma |
| 74 | DF | IND | Suresh Meitei |
| 77 | FW | IND | Bidyashagar Singh |
| 80 | MF | IND | Amarjit Singh Kiyam |
| 81 | MF | IND | Bryce Miranda (on loan from Kerala Blasters) |
| 99 | FW | SLO | Luka Majcen (captain) |

== Transfers ==
=== In ===
| Position | Player | Previous club | Transfer fee | Date | Ref |
|---|---|---|---|---|---|
| MF | (India) Samuel Kynshi | (India) Real Kashmir | Free | 8 May 2023 | |
| DF | (India) Melroy Assisi | (India) Rajasthan United | Undisclosed | 20 July 2023 | |
| MF | (India) Kingsley Fernandes | (India) Churchill Brothers | Free | 20 July 2023 | |
| DF | (India) Nitesh Darjee | (India) Sudeva Delhi | Free | 20 July 2023 | |
| MF | (India) Ricky Shabong | (India) Mohun Bagan SG | Free | 24 July 2023 | |
| FW | (India) Ranjeet Pandre | (India) Mumbai Kenkre | Free | 24 July 2023 | |
| DF | (India) Nikhil Prabhu | (India) Goa | Free | 25 July 2023 | |
| MF | (India) Prasanth Mohan | (India) Chennaiyin | Free | 29 July 2023 | |
| MF | (France) Madih Talal | (Greece) A.E. Kifisia | Free | 12 August 2023 | |
| DF | (India) Tejas Krishna | (India) Kerala Blasters B | Free | 30 August 2023 | |
| FW | (Colombia) Wilmar Jordán | (India) NorthEast United | Free | 31 August 2023 | |
| GK | (India) Shibinraj Kunniyil | (India) Gokulam Kerala | Free | 10 September 2023 | |
| DF | (India) Suresh Meitei | (India) Army Red | Free | 10 September 2023 | |
| DF | (India) Mashoor Shereef | (India) NorthEast United | Free | 10 September 2023 | |
| DF | (Greece) Dimitrios Chatziisaias | (Greece) Atromitos | Free | 20 September 2023 | |
| MF | (India) Isaac Vanmalsawma | (India) Odisha | Free | 31 January 2024 | |
| FW | (India) Bidyashagar Singh | (India) Kerala Blasters FC | Free | 31 January 2024 | |

=== Loans In ===
| Start Date | End Date | Position | Player | From club | Transfer fee | Ref |
|---|---|---|---|---|---|---|
| 25 September 2023 | 31 May 2024 | MF | (India) Amarjit Singh Kiyam | (India) Chennaiyin | Free | |
| 10 September 2023 | 31 May 2024 | MF | (India) Sweden Fernandes | (India) Chennaiyin | Free | |
| 31 January 2024 | 31 May 2024 | MF | (India) Bryce Miranda | (India) Kerala Blasters | Free | |
| 31 January 2024 | 31 May 2024 | MF | (India) Sahil Tavora | (India) Hyderabad | Free | |

=== Loans out ===
| Start Date | End Date | Position | Player | To club | Transfer fee | Ref |
|---|---|---|---|---|---|---|
| 30 August 2023 | 31 May 2024 | DF | (India) Deepak Devrani | (India) Inter Kashi | Free | |
| 30 August 2023 | 31 May 2024 | DF | (India) Tejas Krishna | (India) Inter Kashi | Free | |

=== Out ===
| Date. | No. | Position | Player | Outgoing club | Transfer Fee | Ref |
|---|---|---|---|---|---|---|
| 1 June 2023 | 20 | MF | (Argentina) Juan Nellar | Free Agent | Free | |
| 23 June 2023 | 29 | FW | (India) Ashangbam Aphaoba Singh | (India) Odisha | Free | |
| 25 July 2023 | 14 | DF | (India) Shankar Sampingiraj | (India) Bengaluru | Free | |
| 31 August 2023 | 8 | MF | (India) Freddy Lallawmawma | (India) Kerala Blasters | Undisclosed | |
| 2 September 2023 | 27 | MF | (India) Samuel Lalmuanpuia | (India) Mohammedan | Free | |
| 16 January 2024 | 55 | MF | (Serbia) Aleksandar Ignjatović | (Bosnia and Herzegovina) Rudar Prijedor | Free | |
| 20 January 2024 | 66 | DF | (India) Mashoor Shereef | (India) Gokulam Kerala | Free | |
| 24 January 2024 | 13 | GK | (India) Shibinraj Kunniyil | Free Agent | Free | |
| 27 January 2024 | 4 | DF | (India) Tarif Akhand | (India) Kenkre | Free | |
| 31 January 2024 | 30 | MF | (India) Brandon Vanlalremdika | (India) Sreenidi Deccan | Free | |

== Competition ==
=== Overview ===
Win Draw Loss

| Competition | First match | Last match | Starting round | Final position | Record | | | | | | | |
| Competition | First match | Last match | Starting round | Final position | Pld | W | D | L | GF | GA | GD | Win % |
|---|---|---|---|---|---|---|---|---|---|---|---|---|
| Durand Cup | 7 August 2023 | 16 August 2023 | Group stage | Group stage | 3 | 0 | 1 | 2 | 0 | 3 | −3 | 0.00 |
| Super Cup | 11 January 2024 | 21 January 2024 | Group stage | Group stage | 3 | 0 | 2 | 1 | 3 | 4 | −1 | 0.00 |
| Super League | 21 September 2023 | 10 April 2024 | Matchday 1 | 8th | 22 | 6 | 6 | 10 | 28 | 35 | −7 | 27.27 |
| Total | | | | | 28 | 6 | 9 | 13 | 31 | 42 | −11 | 21.43 |

Last updated: 26 February 2024.
Source: Soccerway

=== Indian Super League ===
==== League table ====
| Pos | Team | Pld | W | D | L | GF | GA | GD | Pts | Qualification |
|---|---|---|---|---|---|---|---|---|---|---|
| 6 | Chennaiyin | 22 | 8 | 3 | 11 | 26 | 36 | −10 | 27 | Qualification for the knockouts |
| 7 | NorthEast United | 22 | 6 | 8 | 8 | 28 | 32 | −4 | 26 | |
| 8 | Punjab | 22 | 6 | 6 | 10 | 28 | 35 | −7 | 24 (Note: Head-to-head points: Punjab 4, East Bengal 1.) | |
| 9 | East Bengal | 22 | 6 | 6 | 10 | 27 | 29 | −2 | 24 | Qualification for the Champions League Two preliminary stage (Note: East Bengal qualified for the AFC Champions League Two preliminary stage by winning the 2024 Super Cup.) |
| 10 | Bengaluru | 22 | 5 | 7 | 10 | 20 | 34 | −14 | 22 | |

Source: Indian Super League
Rules for classification: 1) points; 2) head-to-head points; 3) head-to-head goal difference; 4) head-to-head goals scored; 5) goal difference; 6) number of goals scored; 7) fair play ranking

==== League results by round ====
| Match | 1 | 2 | 3 | 4 | 5 | 6 | 7 | 8 | 9 | 10 | 11 | 12 | 13 | 14 | 15 | 16 | 17 | 18 | 19 | 20 | 21 | 22 |
|---|---|---|---|---|---|---|---|---|---|---|---|---|---|---|---|---|---|---|---|---|---|---|
| Ground | A | A | H | A | A | A | H | A | A | H | H | H | H | A | H | A | H | A | H | A | H | H |
| Result | L | L | D | D | L | L | D | D | D | L | W | L | W | W | L | W | L | W | D | L | L | W |
| League Position | 12 | 12 | 12 | 12 | 12 | 12 | 12 | 12 | 12 | 12 | 11 | 11 | 9 | 9 | 8 | 8 | 7 | 6 | 7 | 8 | 11 | 8 |

Updated to match(es) played on 13 April 2024. Source: Indian Super League
A = Away; H = Home; W = Win; D = Draw; L = Loss

==== Matches ====
Note: FSDL and the Indian Super League announced the fixtures for the first half of the season on 7 September. Meanwhile, the final half of the fixtures were announced on 25 January 2024.

| 23 September 2023 1 | Mohun Bagan SG | 3-1 | Punjab | Kolkata |
| 20:00 IST | Cummings 9'; Petratos 34'; Manvir 63' | Report | Luka Majcen 52' | Stadium: Vivekananda Yuba Bharati Krirangan; Attendance: 27,325; Man of the Match: Petratos |

| 2 October 2023 2 | Goa | 1-0 | Punjab | Margao |
| 20:00 IST | Carlos Martínez 17' | | | Stadium: Fatorda Stadium |

| 6 October 2023 3 | Punjab | 1–1 | NorthEast United | New Delhi |
| 17:30 IST | Melroy Assisi 63' | | Parthib Gogoi 45+1' | Stadium: Jawaharlal Nehru Stadium |

| 22 October 2023 4 | Jamshedpur | 0–0 | Punjab | Jamshedpur |
| 20:00 IST | Chaudhari (yellow card) 62'; J. Singh (yellow card) 83' | Report | Assisi (yellow card) 43'; Chatziisaias (yellow card) 45+1'; Majcen (yellow card) 54'; Prabhu (yellow card) 90' | Stadium: JRD Tata Sports Complex; Attendance: 21,962; Referee: Senthil Nathan |

| 29 October 2023 5 | Chennaiyin | 5–1 | Punjab | Chennai |
| 17:30 IST | Ryan Edwards 24'; Connor Shields 27', 56'; Rafael Crivellaro 45+1' (pen.); Vincy Barretto 84' | | Krishananda Singh 86' | Stadium: Jawaharlal Nehru Stadium |

| 2 November 2023 6 | Mumbai City | 2-1 | Punjab | Mumbai |
| 20:00 IST | Stewart 82'; Díaz 82' | | Luka Majcen 38' | Stadium: Mumbai Football Arena |

| 23 November 2023 7 | Punjab | 1–1 | Hyderabad | New Delhi |
| 17:30 IST | Juan Mera 82' | | Jonathan Moya 90+8' | Stadium: Jawaharlal Nehru Stadium |

| 30 November 2023 8 | Bengaluru | 3–3 | Punjab | Bengaluru |
| 20:00 IST | Harsh Patre 25'; Main 45+1'; Hernández 67' | | Nikhil Prabhu 19'; Dimitrios Chatziisaias 26'; Luka Majcen 30' | Stadium: Sree Kanteerava Stadium |

| 9 December 2023 9 | East Bengal | 0–0 | Punjab | Kolkata |
| 20:00 IST | Herrera (yellow card) 38'; Chakrabarti (yellow card) 67'; Pardo (yellow card) 90+4' | Report | Nitesh Darjee (yellow card) 37'; Nikhil Prabhu N. (yellow card) 41'; Meitei (yellow card) HT | Stadium: Salt Lake Stadium; Attendance: 14,977; Referee: Venkatesh R. Man of the Match: Suresh Meitei (Punjab) |

| 14 December 2023 10 | Punjab | 0–1 | Kerala Blasters | New Delhi |
| 20:00 IST | Prabhu (yellow card) 44'; Lhungdim (yellow card) 54'; Fernandes (yellow card) 87' | Report | Azhar (yellow card) 28'; Kotal (yellow card) 43'; Diamantakos 51' (pen.); Mandal (yellow card) 90+2' | Stadium: Jawaharlal Nehru Stadium; Attendance: 5,992; Referee: Rahul Gupta; Man of the Match: Mohammed Aimen (Kerala Blasters) |

| 18 December 2023 11 | Punjab | 1–0 | Chennaiyin | New Delhi |
| 17:30 IST | Madih Talal 56' | | | Stadium: Jawaharlal Nehru Stadium |

| 26 December 2023 12 | Punjab | 0–1 | Odisha | New Delhi |
| 17:30 IST | | | Roy Krishna 21' | Stadium: Jawaharlal Nehru Stadium |

| 3 February 2024 13 | Punjab | 3–1 | Bengaluru | New Delhi |
| 17:30 IST | Wilmar Jordán 23'; Luka Majcen 71'; Madih Talal 77' | | Sunil Chhetri 15' | Stadium: Jawaharlal Nehru Stadium |

| 12 February 2024 14 | Kerala Blasters | 1–3 | Punjab | Kochi |
| 19:30 IST | Drinčić (yellow card) 26', (goal) 39'; Lallawmawma (yellow card) 90+2'; Diamantakos (yellow card) 90+4' | Report | Jordán 42', 61'; Kumar (yellow card) 88'; Majcen 88' (pen.) | Stadium: Jawaharlal Nehru Stadium; Attendance: 17,650; Referee: I Jamal Mohamed; Man of the Match: Wilmar Jordán (Punjab) |

| 15 February 2024 15 | Punjab | 0–4 | Jamshedpur | New Delhi |
| 19:30 IST | Majcen (penalty missed) 13' | | Chima 11'; Uvais (yellow card) 36'; Sanan 63'; Manzorro 83'; Manzorro 86' | Stadium: Jawaharlal Nehru Stadium; Man of the Match: Jérémy Manzorro |

| 27 February 2024 16 | Hyderabad | 0–2 | Punjab | Hyderabad |
| 17:30 IST | | | Luka Majcen 45'; Madih Talal 56' | Stadium: GMC Balayogi Athletic Stadium |

| 2 March 2024 17 | Punjab | 2-3 | Mumbai City | New Delhi |
| 20:00 IST | Madih Talal 37'; Jordán 39' | | Lallianzuala Chhangte 16'; Iker Guarrotxena 53', 64' | Stadium: Jawaharlal Nehru Stadium |

| 7 March 2024 18 | NorthEast United | 0–1 | Punjab | Guwahati |
| 17:30 IST | | | Jordán 63' (pen.) | Stadium: Indira Gandhi Athletic Stadium |

| 11 March 2024 19 | Punjab | 3-3 | Goa | New Delhi |
| 20:00 IST | Jordán 54'; Luka Majcen 61'; Juan Mera 78' | | Carl McHugh 5'; Carlos Martínez 72' (pen.); Noah Sadaoui 84' | Stadium: Jawaharlal Nehru Stadium |

| 2 April 2024 20 | Odisha | 3-1 | Punjab | Bhubaneswar |
| 19:30 IST | Diego Maurício 34', 68' (pen.); Isak Vanlalruatfela 61' | | Madih Talal 38' | Stadium: Kalinga Stadium |

| 6 April 2024 21 | Punjab | 0-1 | Mohun Bagan SG | New Delhi |
| 17:00 IST | | | Petratos 42' | Stadium: Jawaharlal Nehru Stadium (Delhi) |

| 10 April 2024 22 | Punjab | 4-1 | East Bengal | New Delhi |
| 19:30 IST | Wilmar Jordán 19', 62'; Madih Talal 43'; Luka Majcen 70' | | | Stadium: Jawaharlal Nehru Stadium |

=== Durand Cup ===
Punjab were drawn in the Group A for the 132nd edition of the Durand Cup.

==== Group stage ====
| Pos | Team | Pld | W | D | L | GF | GA | GD | Pts | Qualification | EAB | MBG | (Bangladesh) BAN | PUN |
|---|---|---|---|---|---|---|---|---|---|---|---|---|---|---|
| 1 | East Bengal (H) | 3 | 2 | 1 | 0 | 4 | 2 | +2 | 7 | Qualify for the knockout stage | — | — | 2–2 | 1–0 |
| 2 | Mohun Bagan (H) | 3 | 2 | 0 | 1 | 7 | 1 | +6 | 6 | Qualify for the knockout stage | 0–1 | — | 5–0 | 2–0 |
| 3 | Bangladesh Army | 3 | 0 | 2 | 1 | 2 | 7 | −5 | 2 | | — | — | — | — |
| 4 | Punjab | 3 | 0 | 1 | 2 | 0 | 3 | −3 | 1 | | — | — | 0–0 | — |

Source: Twitter
Rules for classification: Group stage tiebreakers
(H) Hosts

==== Matches ====
| 7 August 2023 | Mohun Bagan SG | 2–0 | Punjab | Kolkata |
| 18:00 IST | M. Assisi 23' (o.g.); Boumous 48' | Report | | Stadium: Kishore Bharati Krirangan; Referee: Venkatesh R Man of the Match: Hugo Boumous (Mohun Bagan SG) |

| 10 August 2023 | Punjab | 0–0 | Bangladesh Army | Kolkata |
| 18:00 IST | | Report | | Stadium: Vivekananda Yuba Bharati Krirangan; Man of the Match: Ashraful Islam Rana (Bangladesh Army) |

| 16 August 2023 | East Bengal | 1–0 | Punjab | Kolkata |
| 18:00 IST | Siverio 22' | Report | | Stadium: Kishore Bharati Krirangan; Man of the Match: Nandhakumar Sekar (East Bengal) |

=== Indian Super Cup ===
==== Group stage ====
The group stage draw for the 2024 Indian Super Cup was conducted on 18 December 2023 with Punjab being drawn in Group C.

| Pos | Team | Pld | W | D | L | GF | GA | GD | Pts | Qualification | MCI | CHE | PFC | GOK |
|---|---|---|---|---|---|---|---|---|---|---|---|---|---|---|
| 1 | Mumbai City | 3 | 3 | 0 | 0 | 6 | 3 | +3 | 9 | Advance to knockout stage | — | 1–0 | 3–2 | 2–1 |
| 2 | Chennaiyin | 3 | 1 | 1 | 1 | 3 | 2 | +1 | 4 | | — | — | 1–1 | 2–0 |
| 3 | Punjab | 3 | 0 | 2 | 1 | 3 | 4 | −1 | 2 | | — | — | — | 0–0 |
| 4 | Gokulam Kerala | 3 | 0 | 1 | 2 | 1 | 4 | −3 | 1 | | — | — | — | — |

Source: AIFF
Rules for classification: 1) points; 2) head-to-head points; 3) head-to-head goal difference; 4) goal difference; 5) number of goals scored; 6) drawing of lots

==== Matches ====
| 11 January 2024 1 | Chennaiyin | 1–1 | Punjab | Bhubaneswar |
| 19:30 IST | Murray 82' | Report | Jordan 4' | Stadium: Kalinga Stadium; Man of the Match: Connor Shields (Chennaiyin) |

| 16 January 2024 2 | Mumbai City | 3–2 | Punjab | Bhubaneswar |
| 19:30 IST | Ayush Chhikara 37', 56'; Seilenthang Lotjem 90+3' | Report | Majcen 28', 87' | Stadium: Kalinga Stadium; Man of the Match: Ayush Chhikara (Mumbai City) |

| 21 January 2024 3 | Punjab | 0–0 | Gokulam Kerala | Bhubaneswar |
| 14:00 IST | | Report | | Stadium: Kalinga Stadium Pitch 1 Man of the Match: Melroy Melwin Assisi (Punjab) |

== Statistics ==
=== Squad appearances and goals ===
All stats are correct as of 4 May 2024

==== All competitions ====
| No. | Pos | Nat | Player | Total | | Super League | | Durand Cup | | Super Cup | |
| No. | Pos | Nat | Player | Apps | Goals | Apps | Goals | Apps | Goals | Apps | Goals |
Goalkeepers
| 1 | GK | (India) IND | Ravi Kumar | 17 | 0 | 16 | 0 | 1 | 0 | 0 | 0 |
| 16 | GK | (Nepal) NEP | Kiran Chemjong | 11 | 0 | 6 | 0 | 2 | 0 | 3 | 0 |
| 31 | GK | (India) IND | Jaskaranvir Singh | 0 | 0 | 0 | 0 | 0 | 0 | 0 | 0 |
Defenders
| 2 | DF | (India) IND | Tekcham Abhishek Singh | 16 | 0 | 12 | 0 | 1 | 0 | 3 | 0 |
| 4 | DF | (India) IND | Nikhil Prabhu | 26 | 1 | 20 | 1 | 3 | 0 | 3 | 0 |
| 5 | DF | (Greece) GRE | Dimitrios Chatziisaias | 23 | 1 | 20 | 1 | 0 | 0 | 3 | 0 |
| 12 | DF | (India) IND | Khaiminthang Lhungdim | 21 | 0 | 17 | 0 | 2 | 0 | 2 | 0 |
| 32 | DF | (India) IND | Pramveer Singh | 0 | 0 | 0 | 0 | 0 | 0 | 0 | 0 |
| 34 | DF | (India) IND | Melroy Assisi | 14 | 1 | 10 | 1 | 3 | 0 | 1 | 0 |
| 39 | DF | (India) IND | Mohammed Salah | 17 | 0 | 13 | 0 | 2 | 0 | 2 | 0 |
| 45 | DF | (India) IND | Nitesh Darjee | 12 | 0 | 9 | 0 | 1 | 0 | 2 | 0 |
| 74 | DF | (India) IND | Suresh Meitei | 15 | 0 | 14 | 0 | 0 | 0 | 1 | 0 |
Midfielders
| 6 | MF | (India) IND | Ricky Shabong | 16 | 0 | 10 | 0 | 3 | 0 | 3 | 0 |
| 8 | MF | (France) FRA | Madih Talal | 25 | 6 | 22 | 6 | 0 | 0 | 3 | 0 |
| 10 | MF | (India) IND | Maheson Singh | 5 | 0 | 1 | 0 | 3 | 0 | 1 | 0 |
| 11 | MF | (India) IND | Samuel Kynshi | 7 | 0 | 5 | 0 | 2 | 0 | 0 | 0 |
| 14 | MF | (Spain) ESP | Juan Mera | 23 | 2 | 17 | 2 | 3 | 0 | 3 | 0 |
| 17 | MF | (India) IND | Manglenthang Kipgen | 5 | 0 | 4 | 0 | 0 | 0 | 1 | 0 |
| 18 | MF | (India) IND | Sweden Fernandes | 0 | 0 | 0 | 0 | 0 | 0 | 0 | 0 |
| 22 | MF | (India) IND | Sahil Tavora | 20 | 0 | 20 | 0 | 0 | 0 | 0 | 0 |
| 23 | MF | (India) IND | Ashis Pradhan | 21 | 0 | 17 | 0 | 3 | 0 | 1 | 0 |
| 24 | MF | (India) IND | Prasanth Mohan | 12 | 0 | 11 | 0 | 1 | 0 | 0 | 0 |
| 30 | MF | (India) IND | Kingsley Fernandes | 8 | 0 | 7 | 0 | 1 | 0 | 0 | 0 |
| 31 | MF | (India) IND | Leon Augustine | 4 | 0 | 2 | 0 | 2 | 0 | 0 | 0 |
| 48 | MF | (India) IND | Isaac Vanmalsawma | 0 | 0 | 0 | 0 | 0 | 0 | 0 | 0 |
| 80 | MF | (India) IND | Amarjit Singh Kiyam | 14 | 0 | 10 | 0 | 3 | 0 | 1 | 0 |
| 81 | MF | (India) IND | Bryce Miranda | 2 | 0 | 2 | 0 | 0 | 0 | 0 | 0 |
Forwards
| 7 | FW | (India) IND | Krishananda Singh | 14 | 1 | 11 | 1 | 2 | 0 | 1 | 0 |
| 9 | FW | (Colombia) COL | Wilmar Jordán | 18 | 9 | 15 | 8 | 0 | 0 | 3 | 1 |
| 19 | FW | (India) IND | Daniel Lalhlimpuia | 9 | 0 | 6 | 0 | 1 | 0 | 2 | 0 |
| 20 | FW | (India) IND | Ranjeet Pandre | 6 | 0 | 3 | 0 | 3 | 0 | 0 | 0 |
| 77 | FW | (India) IND | Bidyashagar Singh | 3 | 0 | 3 | 0 | 0 | 0 | 0 | 0 |
| 99 | FW | (Slovenia) SLO | Luka Majcen | 28 | 10 | 22 | 8 | 3 | 0 | 3 | 2 |

=== Goal scorers ===
As of match played 10 April 2024

| Rank | No. | Pos. | Nat. | Name | League | Durand Cup | Super Cup | Total |
|---|---|---|---|---|---|---|---|---|
| 1 | 99 | FW | (Slovenia) | Luka Majcen | 8 | 0 | 2 | 10 |
| 2 | 10 | FW | (Colombia) | Wilmar Jordán | 8 | 0 | 1 | 9 |
| 3 | 8 | MF | (France) | Madih Talal | 6 | 0 | 0 | 6 |
| 4 | 14 | MF | (Spain) | Juan Mera | 2 | 0 | 0 | 2 |
| 5 | 4 | DF | (India) | Nikhil Prabhu | 1 | 0 | 0 | 1 |
| 5 | 5 | DF | (Greece) | Dimitrios Chatziisaias | 1 | 0 | 0 | 1 |
| 5 | 7 | MF | (India) | Krishananda Singh | 1 | 0 | 0 | 1 |
| 5 | 34 | DF | (India) | Melroy Assisi | 1 | 0 | 0 | 1 |

=== Clean-sheets ===
As of match played 7 March 2024

| Rank | Name | No. | League | Durand Cup | Super Cup | Total |
|---|---|---|---|---|---|---|
| 1 | (India) Ravi Kumar | 1 | 3 | 1 | 0 | 4 |
| 2 | (Nepal) Kiran Chemjong | 16 | 2 | 0 | 1 | 3 |
