= 2024–25 Punjab FC season =

Indian football club season

Punjab FC
2024–25 season
- Director of Football: Nikolaos Topoliatis
- Head coach: Panagiotis Dilmperis
- Stadium: Jawaharlal Nehru Stadium Delhi
- Indian Super League: 10th
- Indian Super Cup: Quarterfinals
- 2024 Durand Cup: Quarterfinals
- Punjab State Super League: Runners-up
- Top goalscorer: League: Luka Majcen (10); All: Luka Majcen (14)
- Highest home attendance: 6,216 (Punjab 1-2 NorthEast United, 23 November)
- Lowest home attendance: 1,816 (Punjab 1-1 Mumbai City, 16 January)
- Average home league attendance: 3,008
- Biggest win: Mumbai City 0-3 Punjab (26 November)
- Biggest defeat: Mohun Bagan Super Giant 3-0 Punjab (5 February)
- All statistics correct as of 12 March 2025.

The 2024–25 season is the fifth season in Punjab FC's existence, and club's second season in the Indian Super League. In addition to the league, they will also compete in the 2024 Durand Cup and the 2025 Super Cup.

== Players ==
=== First-team squad ===
As of 9 January 2025

Note: Flags indicate national team as defined under FIFA eligibility rules; some limited exceptions apply. Players may hold more than one non-FIFA nationality.

| No. | Pos. | Nation | Player |
|---|---|---|---|
| 1 | GK | IND | Ravi Kumar |
| 4 | DF | IND | Nikhil Prabhu |
| 6 | MF | IND | Ricky Shabong |
| 7 | FW | BIH | Asmir Suljić |
| 10 | MF | ARG | Ezequiel Vidal |
| 12 | DF | IND | Khaiminthang Lhungdim |
| 14 | DF | IND | Melroy Assisi |
| 16 | MF | IND | Vinit Rai |
| 17 | MF | IND | Manglenthang Kipgen |
| 20 | FW | GRE | Petros Giakoumakis |
| 23 | MF | IND | Ashis Pradhan |
| 24 | MF | CRO | Filip Mrzljak |
| 25 | MF | IND | Singamayum Shami |

| No. | Pos. | Nation | Player |
|---|---|---|---|
| 26 | DF | IND | Rakesh Meitei (on loan from Kerala Blasters) |
| 27 | DF | IND | Tekcham Abhishek Singh |
| 28 | DF | IND | Denechandra Meitei |
| 31 | MF | IND | Leon Augustine |
| 33 | DF | CRO | Ivan Novoselec |
| 32 | DF | IND | Pramveer Singh |
| 44 | FW | IND | Ninthoinganba Meetei |
| 45 | DF | IND | Nitesh Darjee |
| 47 | GK | IND | Ayush Deshwal |
| 74 | DF | IND | Suresh Meitei |
| 77 | FW | IND | Nihal Sudeesh (on loan from Kerala Blasters) |
| 78 | GK | IND | Muheet Shabir |
| 99 | FW | SLO | Luka Majcen |
| — | MF | IND | Princeton Rebello |

== Transfers ==
=== In ===
| Date | Position | Player | Previous club | Transfer fee | Ref |
|---|---|---|---|---|---|
| 5 July 2024 | MF | (India) Vinit Rai | (India) Mumbai City | Free Transfer | |
| 5 July 2024 | GK | (India) Muheet Shabir | (India) Real Kashmir FC | Free Transfer | |
| 9 July 2024 | FW | (India) Ninthoinganba Meetei | (India) Chennaiyin | Free Transfer | |
| 26 July 2024 | MF | (Croatia) Filip Mrzljak | (Croatia) HNK Gorica | Free Transfer | |
| 29 July 2024 | MF | (India) Princeton Rebello | (India) Odisha | Free Transfer | |
| 4 August 2024 | DF | (Croatia) Ivan Novoselec | (Tajikistan) FC Istiklol | Free Transfer | |
| 4 August 2024 | FW | (Norway) Mushaga Bakenga | (Cyprus) Apollon Limassol | Free Transfer | |
| 20 August 2024 | FW | (Argentina) Ezequiel Vidal | (Indonesia) Persita Tangerang | Free Transfer | |
| 31 August 2024 | FW | (Bosnia and Herzegovina) Asmir Suljić | (Bosnia and Herzegovina) Velež Mostar | Free Transfer | |
| 9 January 2025 | FW | (Greece) Petros Giakoumakis | (Greece) Makedonikos Neapolis | Free Transfer | |

=== Loans In ===
| Start Date | End Date | Position | Player | From club | Transfer fee | Ref |
|---|---|---|---|---|---|---|
| 13 July 2024 | End of Season | FW | (India) Nihal Sudeesh | (India) Kerala Blasters | None | |
| 5 September 2024 | End of Season | DF | (India) Rakesh Meitei | (India) Kerala Blasters | None | |

=== Loans out ===
| Start Date | End Date | Position | Player | To club | Transfer fee | Ref |
|---|---|---|---|---|---|---|
| 27 August 2024 | End of Season | DF | (India) Tejas Krishna | (India) Rajasthan United | None | |
| 1 September 2024 | End of Season | FW | (India) Ranjeet Pandre | (India) Gokulam Kerala | | |
| 4 January 2025 | End of Season | MF | (India) Samuel Kynshi | (India) Rajasthan United | None | |

=== Out ===
| Date. | No. | Position | Player | Outgoing club | Transfer Fee | Ref |
|---|---|---|---|---|---|---|
| 13 June 2024 | 8 | MF | (France) Madih Talal | (India) East Bengal | Free Transfer | |
| 13 June 2024 | 9 | FW | (Colombia) Wilmar Jordán | (India) Chennaiyin | Free Transfer | |
| 13 June 2024 | 14 | FW | (Spain) Juan Mera | (India) Churchill Brothers | Free Transfer | |
| 13 June 2024 | 19 | FW | (India) Daniel Lalhlimpuia | (India) Mumbai City | Free Transfer | |
| 13 June 2024 | 24 | MF | (India) Prasanth Mohan | (India) Inter Kashi | Free Transfer | |
| 13 June 2024 | 39 | DF | (India) Mohammed Salah | (India) Bengaluru | Free Transfer | |
| 13 June 2024 | 48 | MF | (India) Isaac Vanmalsawma | (India) Hyderabad FC | Free Transfer | |
| 13 June 2024 | 77 | FW | (India) Bidyashagar Singh | (India) Inter Kashi | Free Transfer | |
| 13 June 2024 | 80 | MF | (India) Amarjit Singh Kiyam | (India) Mohammedan | | |
| 13 June 2024 | 18 | FW | (India) Sweden Fernandes | (India) Chennaiyin | Loan Return | |
| 13 June 2024 | 22 | MF | (India) Sahil Tavora | (India) Hyderabad | Loan Return | |
| 13 June 2024 | 81 | MF | (India) Bryce Miranda | (India) Kerala Blasters | Loan Return | |
| 13 June 2024 | 26 | MF | (India) Kingsley Fernandes | (India) Churchill Brothers | | |
| 1 August 2024 | 24 | MF | (India) Maheson Singh | (India) Punjab FC 2 | | |
| 13 August 2024 | 5 | DF | (Greece) Dimitrios Chatziisaias | (Iran) Esteghlal Khuzestan | Free Transfer | |
| 31 August 2024 | 7 | FW | (India) Krishananda Singh | (India) SC Bengaluru | Free Transfer | |
| 19 December 2024 | 9 | FW | (Norway) Mushaga Bakenga | Retired | | |

== Personnel ==
=== Current technical staff ===
| Position | Name |
|---|---|
| Head coach | (Greece) Panagiotis Dilmperis |
| Assistant coach | (Greece) Konstantinos Katsaras |
| Assistant coach | (India) Sankarlal Chakraborty |
| Goalkeeping coach | (Nepal) Manish Timsina |
| Strength & conditioning coach | (Greece) Papaioannou Ioannis |
| Team manager | (India) Kamaldeep Singh |
| Technical director | (Greece) Nikolaos Topoliatis |
| Technical director (Youth) | (Italy) Giuseppe Cristaldi |
| Team doctor | (India) Sidak Singh Dhillon |
| Chief analyst | (India) Chaitanya Kulkarni |
| Head of Scouting | (Brazil) (Italy) Luiz Greco |
| Chief Scout | (India) Anush Aathithya |

== Summary ==
August

Punjab FC were placed in Group C of the Durand Cup. They qualified for the knockouts after 2 wins and a draw against Kerala Blasters. In the quarterfinals, Punjab faced Mohun Bagan. The match ended a 3–3 draw after regular time, and it went to a penalty shootout, in which Punjab lost and were eliminated. This marked the team's best performance in any national cup competition on the senior level.

September

Punjab played their first league match of the season away against Kerala Blasters on 15 September 2024, a 2–1 win. Leon Augustine won a penalty in the final minutes of regular time, that was converted by Luka Majcen who had been subbed in. After scoring, Majcen ran to the corner flag, uprooted it and placed his jersey over it, as a response to Kerala Blasters fans chanting against him. In the second minute of stoppage time, Blasters scored an equaliser, but Luka Majcen assisted Filip Mrzljak to score from a small angle in the fifth minute of injury time to win the game for Punjab. Later, Rahul KP's challenge for the ball left Majcen with a fractured jaw, ruling him out for the next 3 games. Punjab followed this away win with two back-to-back home wins against Odisha FC and Hyderabad FC by 2-1 and 2-0 respectively. This made Panagiotis Dilmperis the first manager in the Indian Super League to win his first 3 ISL games. Pulga Vidal scored directly from a free kick against Hyderabad FC to give Punjab the lead, a match they won 2-0.

October

On 18 October, Punjab faced Bengaluru away in a top-of-table clash, narrowly losing 1-0 despite Bengaluru playing with 10 men for majority of the second half. After the first loss of the season, Punjab returned to winning ways on 31 October with a 3-2 Diwali night win over Chennaiyin FC. Chennaiyin's Wilmar Jordan Gil scored against his former club Punjab and did not celebrate. This match marked Majcen's return, who scored two goals in three minutes at the beginning of the second half.

November

From there, Punjab lost 2 games in a row against FC Goa away and NorthEast United at home, on 6 and 23 November respectively. On November 26, Punjab's away trip to Mumbai saw a 3–0 triumph over Mumbai City FC, the defending champions. Pulga Vidal scored right before the end of the first half. Filip Mrzljak won a penalty in the 52nd minute that was converted by Luka Majcen. Mushaga Bakenga scored his first and only ISL goal for the club.

December

In December, Punjab followed the Mumbai win with a 2–0 win over Mohammedan SC at home on 6 December, with goals from Majcen and Mrzljak. On 13 December, Punjab travelled to Jamshedpur and lost 2–1 at the Furnace. Pulga Vidal scored the solitary goal for Punjab, with Javier Siverio's brace winning the game for Jamshedpur. Filip Mrzljak picked up an injury at the beginning of the game. On 16 December, the trip to Kolkata ended in a horror show as Punjab went from leading 2–0 to losing 2–4 to East Bengal. Asmir Suljic and Pulga Vidal's strikes had given Punjab the two-goal lead in the first half. In the second half, Punjab conceded 4 goals within a space of 21 minutes. The equaliser for East Bengal was scored by Hijazi Maher. This also included two own goals by Suresh Meitei, one of which was awarded to East Bengal player Vishnu PV. In the 67th minute, David Lalhlansanga scored the 4th goal for East Bengal. Ivan Novoselec picked up an injury and had to be substituted out, before Khaiminthang Lhungdim was sent off due to a second yellow card. On 19 December, Mushaga Bakenga was released by the club by mutual agreement, and a day later he announced his retirement from football.

Due to Novoselec's injury and Lhungdim's suspension, the next game against Mohun Bagan at home saw Pramveer get his debut, becoming the youngest player to play in the ISL. Ricky Shabong opened the scoring in the 11th minute, a lead that Punjab maintained in the entire first half. In the second half, Alberto Rodriguez scored the equaliser for Mohun Bagan. Pulga Vidal got a yellow card for a challenge on Liston Colaco. He showed disagreement with the referee's decision by clapping sarcastically, for which the referee Rahul Kumar Gupta showed him another yellow card, sending him off the field. Soon after, Melroy Assisi's challenge on Anirudh Thapa was deemed to be enough for a penalty to be awarded to Bagan, which was scored by Jamie Maclaren. Alberto Rodriguez later scored his second goal of the game, Punjab losing 1-3.

January

For the home clash against Kerala Blasters on 5 January, only one out of the 6 foreigners was available (Asmir). Punjab lost the match 1–0 with Noah Sadaoui scoring a penalty kick for Kerala Blasters. On 9 January, Punjab announced the signing of Greek forward Petros Giakoumakis as a replacement for Mushaga Bakenga. On 10 January, Punjab played a 1–1 draw away against NorthEast United, with Lhungdim scoring a 82nd-minute equaliser, before receiving 2 yellow cards in the last minutes and being sent off. Head coach Panagiotis Dilmperis was also sent off in the 86th minute, with both the assistant coaches receiving yellow cards as well. Dilmperis moved to the stands shouting at the referee in anger. Assistant coach Sankarlal Chakraborty managed the team for the home match against Mumbai City on 16 January. Lhungdim and Nikhil Prabhu were also suspended for the fixture. The match ended 1-1, with Luka Majcen scoring for Punjab. Petros Giakoumakis made his debut in ISL. The next game at home against Jamshedpur on 28 January ended in another 2–1 loss as the club's winless streak extended to 7 games. The only goal for the home side was scored by Vidal with a magnificent strike from outside the box that curled inwards and found its way to the back of the net.

February

On 1 February, Punjab faced Bengaluru in Delhi and won their first game since 6 December with a scoreline of 3-2. The winner was scored by Majcen in injury time after an injury time equaliser for Bengaluru by Rahul Bheke. Punjab's second away trip to Kolkata of the league season for facing Mohun Bagan ended in a 3–0 loss on 5 February. Punjab played an organised game in the first half, not giving many chances to the league leaders. In the 55th minute Petros Giakoumakis hit the post from a precise pass given by Vidal. Bagan scored shortly after and later scored 2 more goals. On 10 February the team faced Odisha FC away. Giakoumakis scored his first goal for the club shortly after Rahul KP (now having moved from Blasters to Odisha FC) was sent off. Odisha equalised in the second half due to a blunder from goalkeeper Ravi Kumar and Punjab was unable to score a winner despite the one-man advantage.

On 15 February away against Chennaiyin, Punjab conceded an early penalty goal. Majcen equalised in the start of the second half and the team had several chances at goal, unable to finish. Chima Chukwu scored a late goal for Chennaiyin and Punjab failed to convert any chances afterwards, losing 2-1. The 22 February home clash against East Bengal went badly as the team went 3–0 down by the 54th minute. Vidal scored a goal in response but once again Punjab failed to find a goal out of several chances and lost 3-1. Punjab FC played their last "home" game of the season on 27 February against FC Goa, with Filip and Vidal unavailable due to injury and suspension respectively. Ivan Novoselec picked up an injury in the first half of the match and had to be subbed off. Carl McHugh scored Goa's only goal in the 45th minute. Punjab were yet again unable to score, playing with just one foreigner (Giakoumakis) for the last 30 minutes. After the game, manager Dilmperis praised the players for their hard work, tactical execution and discipline despite the bad results. He commented that Punjab's games were like "watching the same movie again and again". This 1–0 loss ended the club's chances of qualifying for the playoffs.

March

With the playoffs out of reach, the team went to March with the aim of ending the season positively. On 6 March, against 12th placed Hyderabad FC, Punjab won 3-1. Mohammed Suhail's shot hit HFC defender Alex Saji before going in, being given as an own goal. In the second half Suhail assisted Majcen to double the lead before substitute Shami Singamayum scored to make it 3–0 in the 86th minute. Shami, aged just 17 years, became the youngest player ever to score a goal in the Indian Super League. In added time, Chhunga Hmar scored a long ranger to deny Punjab the clean sheet. For the last match of the league season, Punjab travelled to Kolkata to face last-placed Mohammedan SC. Pulga Vidal opened the scoring in the 9th minute with a team goal involving him, Asmir, Majcen and Tekcham. Later in first half, Majcen missed a one-on-one chance against Mohammedan's Padam Chhetri. In the second half, Majcen scored to make it 2-0. However, Mohammedan scored two goals in succession as Punjab's defence lost concentration. The match ended 2-2, ending PFC's 2nd ISL season with 28 points, 8 wins, 4 draws, 12 losses and a goal difference of -4. Punjab finished 10th out of 13 teams.

April

Based on the ISL table, Punjab FC were drawn to face tournament hosts Odisha FC in the Round of 16 of the 2025 Super Cup. The match on 21 April saw Punjab winning 3-0, with goals from Suljic, Vidal and Nihal Sudheesh; and a good performance from goalkeeper Muheet Shabir.

== Competitions ==
| Competition | First match | Last match | Starting round | Final position | Record | | | | | | | |
| Competition | First match | Last match | Starting round | Final position | Pld | W | D | L | GF | GA | GD | Win % |
|---|---|---|---|---|---|---|---|---|---|---|---|---|
| Durand Cup | 30 July 2024 | 23 August 2024 | Group stage | Quarter-final | 4 | 2 | 2 | 0 | 10 | 4 | +6 | 50.00 |
| Indian Super League | 15 September 2024 | 10 March 2025 | Matchday 1 | 10th | 24 | 8 | 4 | 12 | 34 | 38 | −4 | 33.33 |
| Super Cup | 21 April 2025 | 26 April 2025 | Round of 16 | Quarter-final | 2 | 1 | 0 | 1 | 4 | 2 | +2 | 50.00 |
| Punjab State Super League (Note: Punjab FC fielded mostly their Reserve team for the tournament.) | 25 July 2024 | 1 April 2025 | Matchday 1 | Runner-up | 22 | 12 | 4 | 6 | 38 | 21 | +17 | 54.55 |
| Total | | | | | 52 | 23 | 10 | 19 | 86 | 65 | +21 | 44.23 |

Last updated: 30 October 2025
Source: Competitions

=== Durand Cup ===
==== Group C ====
| Pos | Team | Pld | W | D | L | GF | GA | GD | Pts | Qualification | KER | PUN | CIS | MCI |
|---|---|---|---|---|---|---|---|---|---|---|---|---|---|---|
| 1 | Kerala Blasters | 3 | 2 | 1 | 0 | 16 | 1 | +15 | 7 | Advanced to knockout stage | | 1–1 | 7–0 | |
| 2 | Punjab | 3 | 2 | 1 | 0 | 7 | 1 | +6 | 7 | Advanced to knockout stage | | | | 3–0 |
| 3 | CISF Protectors | 3 | 1 | 0 | 2 | 2 | 10 | −8 | 3 | | | 0–3 | | |
| 4 | Mumbai City | 3 | 0 | 0 | 3 | 0 | 13 | −13 | 0 | | 0–8 | | 0–2 | |

Source: Twitter
Rules for classification: Group stage tiebreakers

==== Matches ====
| 30 July 2024 | CISF Protectors | 0–3 | Punjab | Kolkata, West Bengal |
| 19:00 IST | | Report | Majcen 29' 58'; Rai 76' | Stadium: Kishore Bharati Krirangan; Attendance: 172; Referee: Williams Joy Koshy; Man of the Match: Luka Majcen (Punjab) |

| 4 August 2024 | Kerala Blasters | 1–1 | Punjab | Kolkata, West Bengal |
| 16:00 IST | Aimen 56' | Report | Majcen 45+2' | Stadium: Vivekananda Yuba Bharati Krirangan; Attendance: 351; Referee: Senthil Nathan S Man of the Match: Freddy Lallawmawma (Kerala Blasters) |

| 11 August 2024 | Punjab | 3–0 | Mumbai City | Kolkata, West Bengal |
| 16:00 IST | Bakenga 62' 90+8' (pen.); Mrzljak 90+2' | Report | | Stadium: Kishore Bharati Krirangan; Attendance: 212; Referee: Senthil Nathan S Man of the Match: Vinit Rai (Punjab FC) |

==== Knockout Stage ====
Quarter-finals
21 August – Kokrajhar
NorthEast United | 2
Indian Army | 0
21 August – Shillong
Shillong Lajong | 2
East Bengal | 1
23 August – Jamshedpur
Mohun Bagan | 3(6)
Punjab | 3(5)
23 August – Kolkata
Bengaluru | 1
Kerala Blasters | 0

Semi-finals
26 August – Shillong
NorthEast United | 3
Shillong Lajong | 0
27 August – Kolkata
Mohun Bagan | 2(4)
Bengaluru | 2(3)

Final
31 August – Kolkata
NorthEast United | 2(4)
Mohun Bagan | 2(3)

| 23 August 2024 Quarter-finals | Mohun Bagan SG | 3–3 (6–5 p) | Punjab | Jamshedpur, Jharkhand |
| 16:00 IST | Bhat 45'; Manvir 48'; Cummings 79' | Report | Majcen 17' (pen.); Mrzljak 62'; Vidal 71' | Stadium: JRD Tata Sports Complex; Attendance: 3,759; Referee: Mrutyunjay L Amatya |
| | Penalties |
| | Cummings (penalty missed); Manvir (penalty scored); Colaco (penalty scored); Petratos (penalty scored); Stewart (penalty scored); Bose (penalty scored); Aldred (penalty scored) | | (penalty scored) Rai; (penalty scored) Vidal; (penalty scored) Bakenga; (penalty scored) Mrzljak; (penalty missed) Novoselec; (penalty scored) Assisi; (penalty missed) Dene Meitei |

=== Indian Super League ===
==== League table ====
| Pos | Team | Pld | W | D | L | GF | GA | GD | Pts |
|---|---|---|---|---|---|---|---|---|---|
| 8 | Kerala Blasters | 24 | 8 | 5 | 11 | 33 | 37 | −4 | 29 |
| 9 | East Bengal | 24 | 8 | 4 | 12 | 27 | 33 | −6 | 28 (Note: Head-to-head points: East Bengal 6, Punjab 0.) |
| 10 | Punjab | 24 | 8 | 4 | 12 | 34 | 38 | −4 | 28 |
| 11 | Chennaiyin | 24 | 7 | 6 | 11 | 34 | 39 | −5 | 27 |
| 12 | Hyderabad | 24 | 4 | 6 | 14 | 22 | 47 | −25 | 18 |

Source: ISL
Rules for classification: 1) points; 2) goal difference; 3) number of goals scored; 4) head-to-head points; 5) head-to-head goal difference; 6) head-to-head goals scored; 7) fair play ranking; 8) drawing of lots
(Note: Head-to-head record is used only after all the matches between the teams in question have been played).

==== Matches ====
The league fixtures from September till December were announced by the FSDL and AIFF on 25 August 2024.

Win Draw Loss Fixtures

| 15 September 2024 1 | Kerala Blasters | 1–2 | Punjab | Kochi |
| 17:00 IST | Kotal (yellow card) 78'; Saheef (yellow card) 90'; Jiménez 90+2'; Rahul (yellow card) 90+7'; Saheef (yellow card) 90+11'; Freddy (yellow card) 90+11'; Azhar (yellow card) 90+11' | Report | Nihal (yellow card) 69'; Luka Majcen 86' (pen.), (yellow card) 87'; Kumar (yellow card) 90+1'; Mrzljak 90+5'; Bakenga (yellow card) 90+12' | Stadium: Jawaharlal Nehru Stadium; Attendance: 17,498; Referee: Ramachandran Venkatesh; Man of the Match: Nihal Sudeesh (Punjab) |
Note: Stadium capacity was reduced by 50% due to the Onam celebrations across the state.

| 20 September 2024 2 | Punjab | 2–1 | Odisha | Delhi |
| 17:00 IST | Sudeesh 28'; Augustine 89'; Rai (yellow card) 52'; Novoselec (yellow card) 90+2' | Report | Ravi Kumar 90+6' (o.g.); Vanlalruatfela (yellow card) 36' | Stadium: Jawaharlal Nehru Stadium; Attendance: 3,500; Referee: Jamal Mohamed; Man of the Match: Nihal Sudeesh (Punjab FC) |

| 25 September 2024 3 | Punjab | 2–0 | Hyderabad | Delhi |
| 19:300 IST | Vidal 35'; Mrzljak 71'; Tekcham Abhishek (yellow card) 60' | Report | D'Cunha (yellow card) 14' (yellow-red card) 78'; Murgaonkar (yellow card) 41'; Rafi (yellow card) 69' | Stadium: Jawaharlal Nehru Stadium; Attendance: 4,200; Referee: K Ramdasan; Man of the Match: Nikhil Prabhu |

| 18 October 2024 4 | Bengaluru | 1–0 | Punjab | Bangalore |
| 19:30 IST | Roshan 43'; Sana (yellow card) 33' (yellow-red card) 58'; Sandhu (yellow card) 90+6' | Report | Sudeesh (yellow card) 26'; Suljić (yellow card) 84' | Stadium: Sree Kanteerava Stadium; Attendance: 9,348; Referee: Jamal Mohamed |

| 31 October 2024 5 | Punjab | 3–2 | Chennaiyin | Delhi |
| 19:30 IST | Majcen 46' 49'; Suljić 70'; Tekcham Abhishek (yellow card) 42'; Augustine (yellow card) 80' | Report | Jordán 30'; Ravi Kumar 90+9' (o.g.) | Stadium: Jawaharlal Nehru Stadium; Attendance: 1,865; Referee: Pratik Mondal; Man of the Match: Luka Majcen (Punjab FC) |

| 6 November 2024 6 | Goa | 2–1 | Punjab | Margao |
| 19:30 IST | Sadiku 22'; Guarrotxena 49' | | Suljić 13'; Vidal (yellow card) 18'; Shabong (yellow card) 88' | Stadium: Fatorda Stadium; Attendance: 10,821; Referee: Ramachandran Venkatesh |

| 23 November 2024 7 | Punjab | 1–2 | NorthEast United | Delhi |
| 17:00 IST | Novoselec 88'; Augustine (yellow card) 3'; Prabhu (yellow card) 50'; Majcen (yellow card) 90+5'; Suljić (yellow card) 90+9' | | Fernández 15'; Albiach 18'; Dinesh Singh (yellow card) 7' (yellow-red card) 45+4'; Samte (yellow card) 71'; Regragui (yellow card) 85'; Akhtar (yellow card) 90+8' | Stadium: Jawaharlal Nehru Stadium; Attendance: 6,216; Referee: Rahul Kumar Gupta |

| 26 November 2024 8 | Mumbai City | 0–3 | Punjab | Mumbai |
| 19:30 IST | Rane (yellow card) 28'; Manzorro (yellow card) 45+1'; Nazareth (yellow card) 77' | | Vidal 45+1'; Majcen 53' (pen.); Bakenga 84'; Suresh Meitei (yellow card) 30'; Augustine (yellow card) 76'; Ninthoi Meetei (yellow card) 90+3' | Stadium: Mumbai Football Arena; Attendance: 2,549; Referee: Pratik Mondal; Man of the Match: TBD |

| 6 December 2024 9 | Punjab | 2–0 | Mohammedan | Delhi |
| 19:30 IST | Majcen 58'; Mrzljak 66'; Sudeesh (yellow card) 32'; Suresh Meitei (yellow card) 42'; Shabong (yellow card) 89' | | Mallick (yellow card) 35'; Kasimov (yellow card) 84'; Ralte (yellow card) 90+2' | Stadium: Jawaharlal Nehru Stadium; Attendance: 2,146; Referee: Harish Kundu; Man of the Match: TBD |

| 13 December 2024 10 | Jamshedpur | 2–1 | Punjab | Jamshedpur |
| 19:30 IST | Siverio 45+4' 84'; Sarangi (yellow card) 69'; Murray (yellow card) 78'; Eze (yellow card) 81' | | Vidal 46'; Majcen (yellow card) 39'; Prabhu (yellow card) 90+4' | Stadium: JRD Tata Sports Complex; Attendance: 12,440; Referee: TBD |

| 17 December 2024 11 | East Bengal | 4–2 | Punjab | Kolkata |
| 19:30 IST | Maher 46'; Vishnu 54' (yellow card) 74'; Suresh Meitei 69' (o.g.); Lalhlansanga 67'; Sekar (yellow card) 14' | | Suljić 21'; Vidal 39'; Lhungdim (yellow card) 45+3' (yellow-red card) 64'; Rai (yellow card) 57' | Stadium: Vivekananda Yuba Bharati Krirangan; Attendance: 9,989; Referee: Aditya Purkayastha |

| 26 December 2024 12 | Punjab | 1–3 | Mohun Bagan SG | Delhi |
| 19:30 IST | Shabong 12'; Vidal (yellow card) 50' (yellow-red card) 51'; Majcen (yellow card) 66' | | Rodríguez 48' 69'; Maclaren 64' (pen.); Apuia (yellow card) 20' | Stadium: Jawaharlal Nehru Stadium; Attendance: 3,458; Referee: Rahul Kumar Gupta |

| 5 January 2025 13 | Punjab | 0–1 | Kerala Blasters | Delhi |
| 19:30 IST | Prabhu (yellow card) 15'; Suhail (yellow card) 18'; Suljić (yellow card) 62'; Lhungdim (yellow card) 90' | Report | Sadaoui 44' (pen.); Drinčić (yellow card) 22' (yellow-red card) 58'; Bhat (yellow card) 49'; Dohling (red card) 74'; Suresh (yellow card) 90+5' | Stadium: Jawaharlal Nehru Stadium; Referee: Pratik Mondal |
Note: The red card to Aibanbha Dohling was changed to yellow after review by AIFF Disciplinary Committee.

| 10 January 2025 14 | NorthEast United | 1–1 | Punjab | Guwahati |
| 19:30 IST | Ajaraie 24'; Akhtar (yellow card) 31'; Jithin (yellow card) 43'; Zabaco (yellow card) 90+1' | | Lhungdim 82' (yellow card) 86' (yellow-red card) 90+2'; Pramveer (yellow card) 45'; Prabhu (yellow card) 64' | Stadium: Indira Gandhi Athletic Stadium; Attendance: 6,719; Referee: Tejas Nagvenkar; Man of the Match: Asmir Suljić (Punjab FC) |

| 16 January 2025 15 | Punjab | 1–1 | Mumbai City | Delhi |
| 19:30 IST | Majcen 45+1' (yellow card) 45+5'; Novoselec (yellow card) 30'; Pradhan (yellow card) 88' | | Karelis 58'; van Nieff (yellow card) 41'; Toral (yellow card) 88'; Fernandes (yellow card) 90' | Stadium: Jawaharlal Nehru Stadium; Attendance: 1,816; Man of the Match: Asmir Suljić (Punjab FC) |

| 28 January 2025 16 | Punjab | 1–2 | Jamshedpur | Delhi |
| 19:30 IST | Vidal 58' (yellow card) 53'; Suresh Meitei (yellow card) 45+1' | | Chaudhari 41'; Hernández 48'; Siverio (yellow card) 79' | Stadium: Jawaharlal Nehru Stadium; Attendance: 1,896; Referee: Aditya Purkayastha |

| 1 February 2025 17 | Punjab | 3–2 | Bengaluru | Delhi |
| 17:00 IST | Asmir (yellow card) 9' (goal) 55' (pen.); Nikhil (yellow card) 17'; Vidal (yellow card) 37'; Mrzlak 79'; Majcen 90+6' | Report | Méndez 49'; Bheke 90+3' | Stadium: Jawaharlal Nehru Stadium; Attendance: 3,139; Referee: Venkatesh R Man of the Match: Luka Majcen (Punjab) |

| 5 February 2025 18 | Mohun Bagan SG | 3–0 | Punjab | Kolkata |
| | Maclaren 56', 90'; Greg 63' (yellow card) 67'; Suryavanshi (yellow card) 78' | Report | Ivan (yellow card) 45+2'; Pramveer (yellow card) 72'; Lhungdim (yellow card) 90+5' | Stadium: Vivekananda Yuba Bharati Krirangan; Attendance: 28,817; Referee: Crystal John; Man of the Match: Jamie Maclaren (Mohun Bagan SG) |

| 10 February 2025 19 | Odisha | 1–1 | Punjab | Bhubaneshwar |
| 19:30 IST | Isak Ralte 52'; Rahul K. P. (red card) 44'; Gama (yellow card) 45+5' | | Giakoumakis 45+2'; Suresh Meitei (yellow card) 45'; Novoselec (yellow card) 60' | Stadium: Kalinga Stadium; Attendance: 6,814 |

| 15 February 2025 20 | Chennaiyin | 2–1 | Punjab | Chennai |
| 17:00 IST | Wilmar 19' ((P)); Chukwu 84'; Nassiri (yellow card) 9'; Jiteshwor (yellow card) 41' | | Majcen 49' | Stadium: Marina Arena; Attendance: 5,000 |

| 22 February 2025 21 | Punjab | 1–3 | East Bengal | Delhi |
| 19:30 IST | Vidal 62' (yellow card) 51'; Novoselec (yellow card) 36' | | Diamantakos 15'; Mahesh 47'; Lalchungnunga 54'; Messi Bouli (yellow card) 60' | Stadium: Jawaharlal Nehru Stadium; Attendance: 2,606; Referee: R. Venkatesh |

| 27 February 2025 22 | Punjab | 0–1 | Goa | Delhi |
| 19:30 IST | | | McHugh 45' (yellow card) 90+2'; Chhetri (yellow card) 61'; Tavora (yellow card) 89'; Nemil (yellow card) 90+3' | Stadium: Jawaharlal Nehru Stadium; Attendance: 2,128 |

| 6 March 2025 23 | Hyderabad | 1–3 | Punjab | Hyderabad |
| 19:30 IST | Chhunga Hmar 90+4' | | Alex Saji 41' (o.g.); Majcen 56'; Shami 86'; Prabhu (yellow card) 12'; Pramveer (yellow card) 48' | Stadium: G. M. C. Balayogi Athletic Stadium; Referee: Pratik Mondal; Man of the Match: Mohammed Suhail (Punjab FC) |

| 10 March 2025 24 | Mohammedan | 2–2 | Punjab | Kolkata |
| 19:30 IST | Schmerböck 58'; Hansda 66'; França (yellow card) 71' | Report | Vidal 9'; Majcen 53'; Tekcham Abhishek (yellow card) 72' | Stadium: Kishore Bharati Krirangan; Referee: Senthil Nathan; Man of the Match: França (Mohammedan SC) |

=== Super Cup ===
==== Bracket ====
Round of 16
20 April
8 | Kerala Blasters | 2
9 | East Bengal | 0
21 April
2 | Goa | 3
IL4 | Gokulam Kerala | 0
21 April
7 | Odisha | 0
10 | Punjab | 3
23 April
3 | Bengaluru | 1 (3)
IL2 | Inter Kashi (p) | 1 (5)
23 April
6 | Mumbai City | 4
11 | Chennaiyin | 0
24 April
4 | Northeast United | 6
13 | Mohammedan | 0
24 April
5 | Jamshedpur | 2
12 | Hyderabad | 0

Quarter-finals
26 April
8 | Kerala Blasters | 1
1 | Mohun Bagan | 2
26 April
2 | Goa | 2
10 | Punjab | 1
27 April
IL2 | Inter Kashi | 0
6 | Mumbai City | 1
27 April
4 | Northeast United | 0 (4)
5 | Jamshedpur (p) | 0 (5)

Semi-finals
30 April
1 | Mohun Bagan | 1
2 | Goa | 3
30 April
6 | Mumbai City | 0
5 | Jamshedpur | 1

Final
3 May
2 | Goa | 3
5 | Jamshedpur | 0

==== Matches ====
| 21 April 2025 Round of 16 | Odisha | 0–3 | Punjab | Kalinga Stadium |
| 20:00 IST | Puitea (yellow card) 67'; Boumous (yellow card) 76'; Mauricio (yellow card) 78' | Report | Prabhu (yellow card) 12'; Suljić 14'; Sudeesh (yellow card) 64' (goal) 90'; Pradhan (yellow card) 68'; Vidal 69'; Pramveer (yellow card) 84' | Man of the Match: Pulga Vidal |

| 26 April 2025 Quarter final | Goa | 2–1 | Punjab | Bhubaneswar |
| 20:00 IST (UTC+5:30) | Herrera 89'; Yasir 90+4' | Report; PDF | Vidal 57' | Stadium: Kalinga Stadium; Attendance: 1,159; Referee: Aditya Purkayastha; Man of the Match: Borja Herrera (Goa) |

=== Punjab State Super League ===
| Pos | Team | Pld | W | D | L | GF | GA | GD | Pts | Qualification or relegation |
|---|---|---|---|---|---|---|---|---|---|---|
| 1 | Namdhari FC^{IL} (C) | 22 | 13 | 5 | 4 | 43 | 25 | +18 | 44 | Champions |
| 2 | Punjab FC^{ISL} | 22 | 12 | 4 | 6 | 38 | 21 | +17 | 40 | |
| 3 | International FC | 22 | 12 | 3 | 7 | 38 | 25 | +13 | 39 | |
| 4 | Dalbir Football Academy | 22 | 11 | 5 | 6 | 30 | 22 | +8 | 38 | |
| 5 | Punjab Police FC | 22 | 10 | 6 | 6 | 32 | 28 | +4 | 36 | |
| 6 | Young FC | 22 | 10 | 5 | 7 | 28 | 23 | +5 | 35 | |
| 7 | Olympian Jarnail FA | 22 | 9 | 4 | 9 | 37 | 36 | +1 | 31 | |
| 8 | BSF FC | 22 | 8 | 5 | 9 | 30 | 31 | −1 | 29 | |
| 9 | Kehar SC (R) | 22 | 7 | 8 | 7 | 25 | 27 | −2 | 29 | Relegation to Punjab State Second Division |
| 10 | CRPF FC (R) | 22 | 5 | 5 | 12 | 20 | 39 | −19 | 20 | Relegation to Punjab State Second Division |
| 11 | Doaba United FC (R) | 22 | 3 | 4 | 15 | 17 | 38 | −21 | 13 | Relegation to Punjab State Second Division |
| 12 | JCT Academy (R) | 22 | 3 | 4 | 15 | 26 | 49 | −23 | 13 | Relegation to Punjab State Second Division |

Source: The Away End
Rules for classification: 1) points; 2) goal difference; 3) number of goals scored
(C) Champions; (R) Relegated

== Statistics ==
=== Squad appearances and goals ===
All stats are correct as of match played on 3 May 2025

==== All competitions ====
| No. | Pos | Nat | Player | Total | | Super League | | Durand Cup | | Super Cup | |
| No. | Pos | Nat | Player | Apps | Goals | Apps | Goals | Apps | Goals | Apps | Goals |
Goalkeepers
| 1 | GK | (India) IND | Ravi Kumar | 19 | 0 | 15 | 0 | 4 | 0 | 0 | 0 |
| 78 | GK | (India) IND | Muheet Shabir Khan | 11 | 0 | 9 | 0 | 0 | 0 | 2 | 0 |
Defenders
| 3 | DF | (Croatia) CRO | Ivan Novoselec | 24 | 1 | 20 | 1 | 3 | 0 | 1 | 0 |
| 4 | DF | (India) IND | Nikhil Prabhu | 27 | 0 | 21 | 0 | 4 | 0 | 2 | 0 |
| 12 | DF | (India) IND | Khaiminthang Lhungdim | 23 | 1 | 17 | 1 | 4 | 0 | 2 | 0 |
| 14 | DF | (India) IND | Melroy Assisi | 12 | 0 | 8 | 0 | 3 | 0 | 1 | 0 |
| 27 | DF | (India) IND | Tekcham Abhishek Singh | 27 | 0 | 22 | 0 | 3 | 0 | 2 | 0 |
| 28 | DF | (India) IND | Denechandra Meitei | 3 | 0 | 1 | 0 | 2 | 0 | 0 | 0 |
| 35 | DF | (India) IND | Pramveer | 12 | 0 | 10 | 0 | 0 | 0 | 2 | 0 |
| 45 | DF | (India) IND | Nitesh Darjee | 5 | 0 | 3 | 0 | 2 | 0 | 0 | 0 |
| 74 | DF | (India) IND | Suresh Meitei | 28 | 0 | 22 | 0 | 4 | 0 | 2 | 0 |
| | DF | (India) IND | Likmabam Rakesh Meitei | 5 | 0 | 5 | 0 | 0 | 0 | 0 | 0 |
Midfielders
| 6 | MF | (India) IND | Ricky Shabong | 26 | 1 | 24 | 1 | 0 | 0 | 2 | 0 |
| 11 | MF | (India) IND | Samuel Kynshi | 2 | 0 | 0 | 0 | 2 | 0 | 0 | 0 |
| 16 | MF | (India) IND | Vinit Rai | 15 | 1 | 11 | 0 | 4 | 1 | 0 | 0 |
| 17 | MF | (India) IND | Manglenthang Kipgen | 6 | 0 | 5 | 0 | 0 | 0 | 1 | 0 |
| 23 | MF | (India) IND | Ashish Pradhan | 16 | 0 | 11 | 0 | 4 | 0 | 1 | 0 |
| 24 | MF | (Croatia) CRO | Filip Mrzljak | 22 | 6 | 17 | 4 | 4 | 2 | 1 | 0 |
| 26 | MF | (India) IND | Kingsley Fernandes | 1 | 0 | 0 | 0 | 1 | 0 | 0 | 0 |
| 31 | MF | (India) IND | Leon Augustine | 25 | 1 | 20 | 1 | 3 | 0 | 2 | 0 |
| 44 | MF | (India) IND | Ninthoinganba Meetei | 10 | 0 | 9 | 0 | 1 | 0 | 0 | 0 |
| 77 | MF | (India) IND | Nihal Sudeesh | 26 | 2 | 20 | 1 | 4 | 0 | 2 | 1 |
| 25 | MF | (India) IND | Singamayum Shami | 7 | 1 | 5 | 1 | 2 | 0 | 0 | 0 |
Forwards
| 7 | FW | (Hungary) HUN | Asmir Suljić | 24 | 5 | 23 | 4 | 0 | 0 | 1 | 1 |
| 10 | FW | (Argentina) ARG | Ezequiel Pulga Vidal | 25 | 10 | 22 | 7 | 1 | 1 | 2 | 2 |
| 20 | FW | (Greece) GRE | Petros Giakoumakis | 12 | 1 | 10 | 1 | 0 | 0 | 2 | 0 |
| 29 | FW | (India) IND | Muhammad Suhail F | 16 | 0 | 13 | 0 | 1 | 0 | 2 | 0 |
| 30 | FW | (India) IND | Vishal Yadav | 1 | 0 | 1 | 0 | 0 | 0 | 0 | 0 |
| 99 | FW | (Slovenia) SLO | Luka Majcen | 24 | 14 | 20 | 10 | 4 | 4 | 0 | 0 |
| | FW | (Norway) NOR | Mushaga Bakenga | 13 | 3 | 10 | 1 | 3 | 2 | 0 | 0 |
| | FW | (India) IND | Ranjeet Pandre | 1 | 0 | 0 | 0 | 1 | 0 | 0 | 0 |

=== Goal scorers ===
As of match played on 3 May 2025.

| Rank | No. | Pos. | Nat. | Name | League | Durand Cup | Super Cup | Total |
|---|---|---|---|---|---|---|---|---|
| 1 | 99 | FW | (Slovenia) | Luka Majcen | 10 | 4 | 0 | 14 |
| 2 | 30 | MF | (Argentina) | Pulga Vidal | 7 | 1 | 2 | 10 |
| 3 | 24 | MF | (Croatia) | Filip Mrzljak | 4 | 2 | 0 | 6 |
| 4 | 7 | FW | (Hungary) (Bosnia and Herzegovina) | Asmir Suljić | 4 | 0 | 1 | 5 |
| 5 | 9 | FW | (Norway) | Mushaga Bakenga | 1 | 2 | 0 | 3 |
| 6 | 77 | MF | (India) | Nihal Sudeesh | 1 | 0 | 1 | 2 |
| 7 | 3 | DF | (Croatia) | Ivan Novoselec | 1 | 0 | 0 | 1 |
| 7 | 6 | MF | (India) | Ricky Shabong | 1 | 0 | 0 | 1 |
| 7 | 12 | DF | (India) | Khaiminthang Lhungdim | 1 | 0 | 0 | 1 |
| 7 | 16 | MF | (India) | Vinit Rai | 0 | 1 | 0 | 1 |
| 7 | 20 | FW | (Greece) | Petros Giakoumakis | 1 | 0 | 0 | 1 |
| 7 | 25 | MF | (India) | Md. Singamayum Shami | 1 | 0 | 0 | 1 |
| 7 | 31 | MF | (India) | Leon Augustine | 1 | 0 | 0 | 1 |

=== Assists ===
| Rank | No. | Pos. | Name | League | Durand Cup | Super Cup | Total |
|---|---|---|---|---|---|---|---|
| 1 | 10 | MF | Pulga Vidal | 3 | 1 | 1 | 5 |
| 1 | 24 | FW | Filip Mrzljak | 2 | 3 | 0 | 5 |
| 2 | 7 | FW | Asmir Suljić | 4 | 0 | 0 | 4 |
| 3 | 6 | MF | Ricky Shabong | 2 | 0 | 1 | 3 |
| 3 | 99 | FW | Luka Majcen | 3 | 0 | 0 | 3 |
| 4 | 4 | MF | Nikhil Prabhu | 0 | 2 | 0 | 2 |
| 4 | 12 | DF | Khaiminthang Lhungdim | 2 | 0 | 0 | 2 |
| 4 | 20 | FW | Petros Giakoumakis | 2 | 0 | 0 | 2 |
| 4 | 77 | FW | Nihal Sudeesh | 2 | 0 | 0 | 2 |
| 5 | 16 | MF | Vinit Rai | 0 | 1 | 0 | 1 |
| 5 | 17 | MF | Manglenthang Kipgen | 0 | 0 | 1 | 1 |
| 5 | 29 | FW | Mohammed Suhail F | 1 | 0 | 0 | 1 |
| 5 | 44 | FW | Ninthoinganba Meetei | 1 | 0 | 0 | 1 |
| 5 | 9 | FW | Mushaga Bakenga | 1 | 0 | 0 | 1 |

=== Clean sheets ===
| Rank | No. | Name | League | Durand Cup | Super Cup | Total |
|---|---|---|---|---|---|---|
| 1 | 1 | Ravi Kumar | 2 | 2 | 0 | 4 |
| 2 | 78 | Muheet Shabir | 1 | 0 | 1 | 2 |
