= 2022–23 RoundGlass Punjab FC season =

Indian football club season

RoundGlass Punjab
2022–23 season
- Director of Football: Nikolaos Topoliatis
- Head coach: (Greece) Staikos Vergetis
- Stadium: Tau Devi Lal Stadium, Panchkula, Haryana
- I-League: 1st (promoted)
- Super Cup: Group stage
- Top goalscorer: League: Luka Majcen (16 goals); All: Luka Majcen (16 goals)
- Highest home attendance: 6,327 (vs TRAU)
- Lowest home attendance: 200 (vs Gokulam Kerala)
- Average home league attendance: 1,347
- Biggest win: 8–0 (vs Sudeva Delhi (H), 26 February 2023, I-League)
- Biggest defeat: 4–0 (vs Sreenidi Deccan (A), 17 January 2023, I-League)
Home colours	Away colours	Third colours
- All statistics correct as of 16 April 2023.

The 2022–23 season was the eighteenth season in RoundGlass Punjab FC's existence, and their seventh consecutive season in I-League. This season of the I-League witnessed the return of the home-away format of the matches similar to that of the 2019–20 I-League season after a break of two years due to the COVID-19 pandemic in the country.

With a 4–0 away win over Rajasthan United on 4 March 2023, RoundGlass Punjab became the first club to secure promotion to the Indian Super League, from the I-League. On the same day, RoundGlass Punjab were confirmed as champions. RoundGlass Punjab finished with 52 points from 22 matches, becoming the first champion side to cross the 50-point mark since Churchill Brothers in 2012–13.

== Managerial changes ==
During pre-season, it was announced that Ed Engelkes would leave as role as interim first team manager and replaced on 8 August 2022 by Staikos Vergetis. The club later announced Ed Engelkes would return to his role as Technical Director of Youth Affairs.

== Personnel ==
=== Current technical staff ===
Position	Name
Head coach	(Greece) Staikos Vergetis
Assistant coach	(Greece) Dimitrios Kakkos
Goalkeeping coach	(India) Vinay Singh
Strength & Conditioning coach	(Greece) Nikolaos Tsagkatakis
Team Manager	(India) Kamaldeep Singh
Technical Director	(Greece) Nikolaos Topoliatis
Team Doctor	(India) Sidak Dhillon

== Transfers ==
=== In ===
No.	Position	Player	Previous club	Transfer fee	Date	Ref
	GK	(India) Ravi Kumar	(India) Odisha	Free		
	DF	(India) Tarif Akhand	(India) Rajasthan United	Free		
	MF	(India) Krishananda Singh	(India) TRAU	Free		
	FW	(India) Ronaldo Oliveira	(India) Goa B	Free		

=== Out ===
No.	Position	Player	Outgoing club	Ref
03	DF	(India) Saurabh Bhanwala	(India) Rajasthan United	
06	DF	(India) Bikramjit Singh	(India) Real Kashmir	
10	MF	(Spain) Joseba Beitia	(India) Rajasthan United	
12	MF	(India) Rupert Nongrum	(India) NorthEast United	
19	DF	(India) Denzil Kharshandi		
27	MF	(India) Aakash Sangwan	(India) Chennaiyin	
31	DF	(India) Ashray Bhardwaj	(India) Sudeva Delhi	
33	FW	(India) Sumeet Passi	(India) East Bengal	
	MF	(India) Kean Lewis	(India) Mohammedan	
	FW	(India) Robin Singh	(India) SC Bengaluru	
	GK	(India) Lalthuammawia Ralte	(India) Odisha	
9	FW	(England) Kurtis Guthrie	(Scotland) Livingston	
11	FW	(Australia) Travis Major	(Australia) Blacktown City	

== Competition ==
=== Overview ===
Win Draw Loss

Competition	First match	Last match	Starting round	Record							
Competition	First match	Last match	Starting round	Pld	W	D	L	GF	GA	GD	Win %
Super Cup	8 April 2023	16 April 2023	Group stage	3	1	0	2	2	5	−3	33.33
I-League	14 November 2022	12 March 2023	Matchday 1	22	16	4	2	45	16	+29	72.73
Total				25	17	4	4	47	21	+26	68.00

Last updated: 16 April 2023
Source: Soccerway

=== I-League ===
==== League table ====
Pos	Team	Pld	W	D	L	GF	GA	GD	Pts	Qualification
1	RoundGlass Punjab (C, P)	22	16	4	2	45	16	+29	52	Champions, Promotion to 2023–24 Indian Super League
2	Sreenidi Deccan	22	13	3	6	44	29	+15	42	
3	Gokulam Kerala	22	12	3	7	26	14	+12	39	
4	TRAU	22	11	2	9	34	34	0	35	
5	Real Kashmir	22	9	7	6	27	25	+2	34	

Source: I-League
Rules for classification: 1) points; 2) head-to-head points; 3) head-to-head goal difference; 4) goal difference; 5) number of goals scored; 6) drawing of lots
(C) Champions; (P) Promoted

==== League Results by Round ====
Match	1	2	3	4	5	6	7	8	9	10	11	12	13	14	15	16	17	18	19	20	21	22
Ground	H	H	H	H	A	A	A	H	H	H	A	A	H	A	A	A	A	A	H	H	A	H
Result	W	W	D	W	L	W	D	W	W	W	L	W	W	D	D	W	W	W	W	W	W	W
League Position	1	2	2	2	3	5	3	4	2	2	1	2	1	1	2	2	2	2	1	1	1	1

Updated to match(es) played on 12 March 2023. Source: I-League
A = Away; H = Home; W = Win; D = Draw; L = Loss

=== Matches ===
Note: I-League announced the fixtures for the 2022–23 season on 1 November 2022.

14 November 2022 1	RoundGlass Punjab	2–1	Sreenidi Deccan	Panchkula, Haryana
19.00 IST	Majcen 23'; Sampingiraj (yellow card) 31'; Lalmuanpuia 42'; Šećerović (yellow card) 90+3'	Report	Shayesteh (yellow card) 24'; S. Khan 58'	Stadium: Tau Devi Lal Stadium; Attendance: 1,321; Referee: Lalit Singh Rawat; Man of the Match: Samuel Lalmuanpuia (RoundGlass Punjab)

20 November 2022 2	RoundGlass Punjab	1–0	Mohammedan	Panchkula, Haryana
16.30 IST	Majcen 3'; Devrani (yellow card) 83'	Report	Joseph (yellow card) 22'; Faiaz (yellow card) 38'; Shaheen (yellow card) 40'; Roy (yellow card) 78'; Vaz (yellow card) 83'	Stadium: Tau Devi Lal Stadium; Attendance: 1,420; Referee: Akashkumar Kamleshkumar Mehta; Man of the Match: Luka Majcen (RoundGlass Punjab)

23 November 2022 3	RoundGlass Punjab	1–1	Rajasthan United	Panchkula, Haryana
16.30 IST	Lalhlimpuia 13'; Ignjatović (yellow card) 17'; Šećerović (yellow card) 65'	Report	Mambetaliev (yellow card) 45+3'; Cháves (yellow card) 77'; Nikum 90+1'; Marong (yellow card) 90+2'	Stadium: Tau Devi Lal Stadium; Attendance: 1,137; Referee: Lakshay; Man of the Match: Daniel Lalhlimpuia (RoundGlass Punjab)

28 November 2022 4	RoundGlass Punjab	2–1	Aizawl	Panchkula, Haryana
19.00 IST	Majcen 16' (pen.); Šećerović (yellow card) 57'; Ignjatović (yellow card) 76'; Devrani (yellow card) 76' (goal) 77'	Report	Lalchhawnkima (yellow card) 15' (penalty missed); R. Lalthanmawia 26'; V. Lakhbir Singh (yellow card) 60'	Stadium: Tau Devi Lal Stadium; Attendance: 850; Referee: Tanmoy Dhar; Man of the Match: Deepak Devrani (RoundGlass Punjab)

8 December 2022 5	TRAU	2–0	RoundGlass Punjab	Imphal, Manipur
16.30 IST	B. Samte 25'; S. Johnson Singh 54'; Vieira (yellow card) 72'	Report	Naocha (yellow card) 17'; Chemjong (yellow card) 24'	Stadium: Khuman Lampak Main Stadium; Attendance: 2,150; Referee: Dipu Roy; Man of the Match: Buanthanglun Samte (TRAU)

12 December 2022 6	Real Kashmir	0–1	RoundGlass Punjab	Srinagar, Jammu and Kashmir
14.00 IST	Akashdeep (yellow card) 5' (yellow-red card) 49'; Moro (yellow card) 27' (yellow-red card) 76'; Bawitlung (yellow card) 60'	Report	Bhumij 21'; K. Lhungdim (yellow card) 65'	Stadium: TRC Turf Ground; Attendance: 3,446; Referee: Jatinder Singh; Man of the Match: Brandon Vanlalremdika (RoundGlass Punjab)

16 December 2022 7	Churchill Brothers	0–0	RoundGlass Punjab	Vasco da Gama, Goa
19.00 IST	Vanlalduatsanga (yellow card) 66'; Fernandes (yellow card) 90'	Report	F. Lallawmawma (yellow card) 45+3'	Stadium: Tilak Maidan; Attendance: 3,475; Referee: Williams Joy Koshy; Man of the Match: Joseph Clemente (Churchill Brothers)

21 December 2022 8	RoundGlass Punjab	1–0	Gokulam Kerala	Panchkula, Haryana
19.00 IST	Majcen 75'; Šećerović (yellow card) 84'	Report	Noor (yellow card) 55'	Stadium: Tau Devi Lal Stadium; Attendance: 200; Referee: Ashish Tiwari; Man of the Match: Luka Majcen (RoundGlass Punjab)

8 January 2023 9	RoundGlass Punjab	3–1	NEROCA	Panchkula, Haryana
14.00 IST	Majcen 12'; Vanlalremdika 15'; Devrani (yellow card) 62'; Krishananda 77'	Report	Fletcher (yellow card) 40'; Gopi Singh 44'	Stadium: Tau Devi Lal Stadium; Attendance: 1,100; Referee: Surojit Das; Man of the Match: Brandon Vanlalremdika (RoundGlass Punjab)

14 January 2023 10	RoundGlass Punjab	3–0	Mumbai Kenkre	Panchkula, Haryana
16.30 IST	Mera 3', 27'; K. Lhungdim (yellow card) 76'; Majcen 84'	Report		Stadium: Tau Devi Lal Stadium; Attendance: 1,100; Referee: Joyshing Monsang Thumli; Man of the Match: Juan Mera (RoundGlass Punjab)

17 January 2023 11	Sreenidi Deccan	4–0	RoundGlass Punjab	Hyderabad, Telangana
14.00 IST	S. Khan 12'; Castañeda 30', 88'; Awal (yellow card) 45+4'; Dinesh 62'	Report	Majcen (yellow card) 45+4'; Naocha (yellow card) 71'; Krishananda (yellow card) 83'	Stadium: Deccan Arena; Attendance: 500; Referee: Mrutyunjay L Amatya; Man of the Match: David Castañeda (Sreenidi Deccan)

22 January 2023 12	Mohammedan	0–4	RoundGlass Punjab	Kolkata, West Bengal
16.30 IST	Ambekar (yellow card) 25'	Report	Mera 17', 75' (yellow card) 61'; Majcen 40', 51' (yellow card) 72'	Stadium: Kishore Bharati Krirangan; Attendance: 2,876; Referee: Lakshay; Man of the Match: Luka Majcen (RoundGlass Punjab)

27 January 2023 13	RoundGlass Punjab	2–0	Real Kashmir	Panchkula, Haryana
16.30 IST	Mera 41'; Vanlalremdika 63'; Krishananda (yellow card) 65'; Valpuia (yellow card) 79'	Report	Agyemang (yellow card) 40'; Akashdeep (yellow card) 55'; George (yellow card) 73'; Kamalpreet (yellow card) 74'; Davronov (yellow card) 80'	Stadium: Tau Devi Lal Stadium; Attendance: 300; Referee: K Ramdasan; Man of the Match: Brandon Vanlalremdika (RoundGlass Punjab)

1 February 2023 14	Mumbai Kenkre	3–3	RoundGlass Punjab	Mumbai, Maharashtra
19.00 IST	Pandre 3', 40' (yellow card) 40'; A. Gaikwad 5'; K. Pandre (yellow card) 37'; P. Chettri (yellow card) 40'; S. Negi (yellow card) 44' (yellow-red card) 52'; A. Rajan (yellow card) 50'	Report	Gyeltshen (yellow card) 15' (goal) 26'; Pradhan (yellow card) 24'; Naocha 27'; Nongkhlaw 39' (o.g.); K. Lhungdim (yellow card) 44'; Devrani (yellow card) 90+8'	Stadium: Cooperage Ground; Attendance: 853; Referee: Dipu Roy; Man of the Match: Ranjeet Pandre (Mumbai Kenkre)

5 February 2023 15	Sudeva Delhi	1–1	RoundGlass Punjab	New Delhi, Delhi
14.00 IST	Lalmuanpuia (yellow card) 68'; Majcen 79'; Naocha (yellow card) 90' (red card) 90+8'	Report	Abioye (yellow card) 90'; S. Sadhu 90+6'	Stadium: Chhatrasal Stadium; Attendance: 150; Referee: Akashkumar Kamleshkumar Mehta; Man of the Match: Sujit Sadhu (Sudeva Delhi)

9 February 2023 16	Gokulam Kerala	1–2	RoundGlass Punjab	Calicut, Kerala
16.30 IST	Zaman (yellow card) 32'; S. Adhikari (yellow card) 44'; Saini (yellow card) 60'; Noor 73' (yellow card) 76'; Kumar (yellow card) 84'	Report	J. Nellar (yellow card) 9'; Kumar 39' (o.g.); Majcen 70'	Stadium: EMS Stadium; Attendance: 1,285; Referee: Lalit Singh Rawat; Man of the Match: Luka Majcen (RoundGlass Punjab)

13 February 2023 17	Aizawl	0–1	RoundGlass Punjab	Aizawl, Mizoram
16.30 IST		Report	T. Abhishek Singh (yellow card) 50'; Gyeltshen 53'	Stadium: Rajiv Gandhi Stadium; Attendance: 2,210; Referee: Tanmay Dhar; Man of the Match: Kiran Chemjong (RoundGlass Punjab)

20 February 2023 18	NEROCA	0–1	RoundGlass Punjab	Imphal, Manipur
19.00 IST	Bayi (yellow card) 38'; Tondomba (yellow card) 48'; M. Kosimov (yellow card) 90+4'	Report	Chhetri 34' (yellow card) 35'; F. Lallawmawma (yellow card) 38'; Chemjong (yellow card) 82'; Meitei (yellow card) 85'	Stadium: Khuman Lampak Main Stadium; Attendance: 3,700; Referee: Surojit Das; Man of the Match: Kiran Chemjong (RoundGlass Punjab)

26 February 2023 19	RoundGlass Punjab	8–0	Sudeva Delhi	Panchkula, Haryana
16.30 IST	Mera 21', 33', 75'; Majcen 28', 69'; T. Abhishek Singh 78'; J. Nellar 84'; Maheson 90+3'	Report	Gómez (yellow card) 45+2'	Stadium: Tau Devi Lal Stadium; Attendance: 500; Referee: Mrutyunjay Amatya; Man of the Match: Juan Mera (RoundGlass Punjab)

1 March 2023 20	RoundGlass Punjab	3–1	Churchill Brothers	Panchkula, Haryana
19.00 IST	Mera (yellow card) 20' (goal) 79'; Majcen 26'; Meitei (yellow card) 52'; Gyeltshen 55'; Chhetri (yellow card) 56'	Report	Mukhammad (yellow card) 20'; Cháves 83'	Stadium: Tau Devi Lal Stadium; Attendance: 560; Referee: Jehrul Islam; Man of the Match: Juan Mera (RoundGlass Punjab)

4 March 2023 21	Rajasthan United	0–4	RoundGlass Punjab	New Delhi, Delhi
17.30 IST	Gurung (yellow card) 15'; Amangeldiev (yellow card) 62'; Amritpal (yellow card) 90+1'; M. Assisi (yellow card) 90+4'	Report	Y. Tripathi 16' (o.g.); Majcen 41'; Mera 76' (yellow card) 77'; Meitei (yellow card) 85'; Valpuia 90+2'	Stadium: Ambedkar Stadium; Attendance: 500; Referee: Pratik Mondal; Man of the Match: Chencho Gyeltshen (RoundGlass Punjab)

12 March 2023 22	RoundGlass Punjab	2–0	TRAU	Panchkula, Haryana
19.00 IST	Valpuia (yellow card) 31'; Majcen 36', 49' (yellow card) 50'; Ravi (yellow card) 84'; Sampingiraj (yellow card) 90+3'	Report	Fernandinho (yellow card) 31'; Williams (yellow card) 42'	Stadium: Tau Devi Lal Stadium; Attendance: 6,327; Referee: Aditya Purkayastha; Man of the Match: Luka Majcen (RoundGlass Punjab)

=== Super Cup ===
RoundGlass Punjab were drawn in the Group A for the 3rd edition of the Super Cup along with two ISL clubs and one I-League club.

==== Group stage ====
Pos	Team	Pld	W	D	L	GF	GA	GD	Pts		BEN	SRD	KER	RGP
1	Bengaluru	3	1	2	0	4	2	+2	5	Advance to knockout stage	—	1–1	1–1	—
2	Sreenidi Deccan	3	1	1	1	3	2	+1	4 (Note: Head-to-head points: Sreenidi Deccan 3, Kerala Blasters 0.)		—	—	2–0	—
3	Kerala Blasters	3	1	1	1	4	4	0	4		—	—	—	3–1
4	Punjab	3	1	0	2	2	5	−3	3		0–2	1–0	—	—

Source: AIFF
Rules for classification: 1) points; 2) head-to-head points; 3) head-to-head goal difference; 4) goal difference; 5) number of goals scored; 6) drawing of lots

==== Matches ====
Win Draw Loss

==== Group stage ====
8 April 2023 1	Kerala Blasters	3–1	RoundGlass Punjab	Calicut, Kerala
20.30 IST	Diamantakos 41' (pen.); Kumar 54'; Praveen 90+5'	Report	Vanlalremdika (yellow card) 50'; Mera (yellow card) 65'; Krishananda 73'	Stadium: EMS Stadium; Attendance: 11,562; Referee: Tejas Visvasrao Nagvenkkar; Man of the Match: Nishu Kumar (Kerala Blasters)

12 April 2023 2	RoundGlass Punjab	0–2	Bengaluru	Calicut, Kerala
20:30 IST	K. Lhungdim (yellow card) 35'; Naocha (yellow card) 54' (yellow-red card) 78'	Report	Kumar (yellow card) 39'; Shrivas (yellow card) 40'; Jhingan (yellow card) 53'; Udanta 67'; Hernández 90+6' (pen.)	Stadium: EMS Stadium; Attendance: 2,375; Referee: Pratik Mondal; Man of the Match: Sandesh Jhingan (Bengaluru)

16 April 2023 3	RoundGlass Punjab	1–0	Sreenidi Deccan	Manjeri, Kerala
20:30 IST	Valpuia (yellow card) 7' (goal) 41'; F. Lallawmawma (yellow card) 71'	Report	Bagui (yellow card) 45+4'	Stadium: Payyanad Stadium; Attendance: 2,023; Referee: I Jamal Mohamed; Man of the Match: Kiran Chemjong (RoundGlass Punjab)

== Statistics ==
All stats are correct as of 16 April 2023

=== Squad appearances and goals ===
==== All competitions ====
No.	Pos	Nat	Player	Total		I-League		Super Cup	
No.	Pos	Nat	Player	Apps	Goals	Apps	Goals	Apps	Goals
Goalkeepers
1	GK	(India) IND	Ravi Kumar	1	0	1	0	0	0
16	GK	(Nepal) NEP	Kiran Chemjong	24	0	21	0	3	0
31	GK	(India) IND	Jaskaranvir Singh	1	0	0+1	0	0	0
Defenders
2	DF	(India) IND	Tekcham Abhishek Singh	4	1	2+2	1	0	0
4	DF	(India) IND	Tarif Akhand	0	0	0	0	0	0
5	DF	(India) IND	Valpuia	18	2	13+2	1	3	1
12	DF	(India) IND	Khaiminthang Lhungdim	23	0	20	0	3	0
14	DF	(India) IND	Shankar Sampingiraj	4	0	1+3	0	0	0
26	DF	(India) IND	Deepak Devrani	8	1	8	1	0	0
39	DF	(India) IND	Mohammed Salah	10	0	7	0	2+1	0
50	DF	(India) IND	Naocha Singh	17	1	15	1	1+1	0
55	DF	(Serbia) SRB	Aleksandar Ignjatović	21	0	13+6	0	0+2	0
74	DF	(India) IND	Suresh Meitei	13	0	9+1	0	3	0
Midfielders
6	MF	(India) IND	Ajay Chhetri	21	1	14+5	1	1+1	0
8	MF	(India) IND	Freddy Lallawmawma	22	0	17+2	0	3	0
10	MF	(India) IND	Maheson Singh	11	1	1+9	1	1	0
20	MF	(Argentina) ARG	Juan Nellar	9	1	2+4	1	3	0
23	MF	(India) IND	Ashis Pradhan	10	0	6+3	0	0+1	0
27	MF	(India) IND	Samuel Lalmuanpuia	8	1	5+3	1	0	0
30	MF	(India) IND	Brandon Vanlalremdika	23	2	19+1	2	2+1	0
42	MF	(India) IND	Manglenthang Kipgen	3	0	0+3	0	0	0
Forwards
7	FW	(India) IND	Krishananda Singh	21	2	6+12	1	2+1	1
11	FW	(Spain) ESP	Juan Mera	21	10	14+4	10	3	0
19	FW	(India) IND	Daniel Lalhlimpuia	19	1	6+10	1	0+3	0
21	FW	(India) IND	Pranjal Bhumij	11	1	6+4	1	0+1	0
29	FW	(India) IND	Ashangbam Aphaoba Singh	0	0	0	0	0	0
99	FW	(Slovenia) SLO	Luka Majcen	23	16	19+1	16	3	0
Players who have made an appearance or had a squad number this season but have left the club
9	FW	(India) IND	Ronaldo Oliveira	0	0	0	0	-	-
13	DF	(India) IND	Bikash Yumnam	0	0	0	0	-	-
15	MF	(India) IND	Bidyananda Singh	1	0	0+1	0	-	-
17	MF	(India) IND	Telem Suranjit Singh	0	0	0	0	-	-
22	MF	(Bosnia and Herzegovina) BIH	Adnan Šećerović	8	0	7+1	0	-	-
77	FW	(Bhutan) BHU	Chencho Gyeltshen	12	3	10+2	3	-	-

=== Clean-sheets ===
Rank	Name	No.	League	Super Cup	Total
1	(Nepal) Kiran Chemjong	16	11	1	12
2	(India) Ravi Kumar	1	1	0	1
2	(India) Jaskaranvir Singh	31	1	0	1
