= 2023 AIFF Super Cup group stage =

Group stage of 2023 Super Cup

The 2023 Hero Super Cup group stage was played from 8th to 19th April. A total of 16 teams, consisting of 11 ISL and 5 I-League, competed in the group stage to decide the 4 places in the knockout stage.

== Draw ==
The draw for the group stage was held at the AIFF headquarters, Football House in New Delhi on Tuesday, March 7, 2023. The 16 teams were drawn into four groups of four. For the draw, the teams were seeded into four pots, each of four teams, based on the following principles:

- Pot 1 contained the top four finishers in the 2022–23 Indian Super League.
- Pot 2 contained 5th- to 8th-placed teams in the 2022–23 Indian Super League.
- Pot 3 contained the remaining 3 teams in the ISL and 2022–23 I-League champions.
- Pot 4 contained the 4 winners of the qualifying round.

Pot 1	Pot 2	Pot 3	Pot 4
Mumbai City FC; Hyderabad FC; Mohun Bagan SG; Bengaluru FC	Kerala Blasters FC; Odisha FC; FC Goa; Chennaiyin FC	East Bengal FC; Jamshedpur FC; NorthEast United FC; RoundGlass Punjab FC	Qualifier 1 winner Qualifier 2 winner Qualifier 3 winner Qualifier 4 winner

== Format ==
Each group was played in a single round-robin format. The top team advanced to the knockout stage.

=== Tiebreakers ===
The teams were ranked according to points (3 points for a win, 1 point for a draw, 0 points for a loss). When tied on points, tiebreakers were applied in the following order:

1. Points in head-to-head matches among tied teams;
2. Goal difference in head-to-head matches among tied teams;
3. Goals scored in head-to-head matches among tied teams;
4. If more than two teams are tied, and after applying all head-to-head criteria above, a subset of teams are still tied, all head-to-head criteria above are reapplied exclusively to this subset of teams;
5. Goal difference in all group matches;
6. Goals scored in all group matches;
7. Drawing of lots.

== Centralised venues ==
On 7 March, the AIFF announced that for the first time the tournament would be played in Kerala, across two cities— Kozhikode and Manjeri.

- Group A, C: EMS Stadium
- Group B, D: Payyanad Stadium

== Groups ==
=== Group A ===
Pos	Team	Pld	W	D	L	GF	GA	GD	Pts		BEN	SRD	KER	RGP
1	Bengaluru	3	1	2	0	4	2	+2	5	Advance to knockout stage	—	1–1	1–1	—
2	Sreenidi Deccan	3	1	1	1	3	2	+1	4 (Note: Head-to-head points: Sreenidi Deccan 3, Kerala Blasters 0.)		—	—	2–0	—
3	Kerala Blasters	3	1	1	1	4	4	0	4		—	—	—	3–1
4	Punjab	3	1	0	2	2	5	−3	3		0–2	1–0	—	—

Source: AIFF
Rules for classification: 1) points; 2) head-to-head points; 3) head-to-head goal difference; 4) goal difference; 5) number of goals scored; 6) drawing of lots

==== Matches ====
8 April 2023 1	Bengaluru	1–1	Sreenidi Deccan	Kozhikode
17:00 IST	Hernández 10'	Report	Shayesteh 21'; Dinesh (yellow card) 24'	Stadium: EMS Stadium; Attendance: 3,214; Referee: Rowan Arumughan; Man of the Match: Bijay Chhetri (Sreenidi Deccan)

8 April 2023 2	Kerala Blasters	3–1	Punjab FC	Kozhikode
20:30 IST	Diamantakos 41' (pen.); Nishu 54'; Rahul 90+5'	Report	Vanlalremdika (yellow card) 50'; Mera (yellow card) 65'; Krishananda 73'	Stadium: EMS Stadium; Attendance: 11,562; Referee: Tejas Visvasrao Nagvenkar; Man of the Match: Nishu Kumar (Kerala Blasters)

12 April 2023 3	Sreenidi Deccan	2–0	Kerala Blasters	Kozhikode
17:30 IST	Hassan 17'; Castañeda 44'; Dinesh (yellow card) 64'	Report	Adhikari (yellow card) 16'; Jeakson (yellow card) 59'; Diamantakos (yellow card) 89'	Stadium: EMS Stadium; Attendance: 7,458; Referee: Aditya Purkayastha; Man of the Match: Phalguni Singh (Sreenidi Deccan)

12 April 2023 4	Punjab FC	0–2	Bengaluru	Kozhikode
20:30 IST	K. Lhungdim (yellow card) 35'; Naocha (yellow card) 54' (yellow-red card) 78'	Report	Kumar (yellow card) 39'; Shrivas (yellow card) 40'; Jhingan (yellow card) 53'; Udanta 67'; Hernández 90+6' (pen.)	Stadium: EMS Stadium; Attendance: 2,375; Referee: Pratik Mondal; Man of the Match: Sandesh Jhingan (Bengaluru)

16 April 2023 5	Punjab FC	1–0	Sreenidi Deccan	Manjeri
20:30 IST	Valpuia (yellow card) 7' (goal) 41'; F. Lallawmawma (yellow card) 71'	Report	Bagui (yellow card) 45+4'	Stadium: Payyanad Stadium; Attendance: 2,023; Referee: I Jamal Mohamed; Man of the Match: Kiran Chemjong (RoundGlass Punjab)

16 April 2023 6	Bengaluru	1–1	Kerala Blasters	Kozhikode
20:30 IST	Krishna 23' (yellow card) 45'	Report	Lešković (yellow card) 35'; Diamantakos 77'	Stadium: EMS Stadium; Attendance: 22,565; Referee: Rahul Kumar Gupta; Man of the Match: Javi Hernández (Bengaluru)

=== Group B ===
Pos	Team	Pld	W	D	L	GF	GA	GD	Pts	Qualification	OFC	HYD	EAB	AIZ
1	Odisha	3	2	1	0	6	2	+4	7	Advance to knockout stage	—	—	1–1	—
2	Hyderabad	3	1	1	1	6	6	0	4		1–2	—	—	2–1
3	East Bengal	3	0	3	0	6	6	0	3		—	3–3	—	2–2
4	Aizawl	3	0	1	2	3	7	−4	1		0–3	—	—	—

Source: AIFF
Rules for classification: 1) points; 2) head-to-head points; 3) head-to-head goal difference; 4) goal difference; 5) number of goals scored; 6) drawing of lots

==== Matches ====
9 April 2023 1	Hyderabad	2–1	Aizawl	Manjeri
17:00 IST	Chianese 17'; Mohammed (yellow card) 36'; Victor 51' (pen.)	Report	Lalramsanga (yellow card) 11'; Lalchhawnkima (yellow card) 90'; Veras 90+6'	Stadium: Payyanad Stadium; Attendance: 452; Referee: Harish Kundu; Man of the Match: Joel Chianese (Hyderabad)

9 April 2023 2	Odisha	1–1	East Bengal	Manjeri
20:30 IST	Mawihmingthanga (yellow card) 45'; Rebello (yellow card) 54'; Sekar 73'	Report	Rahman 38'	Stadium: Payyanad Stadium; Attendance: 3,412; Referee: Rahul Kumar Gupta; Man of the Match: Diego Maurício (Odisha)

13 April 2023 3	Aizawl	0–3	Odisha	Manjeri
17:00 IST		Report	Maurício 47'; Rodríguez 55'; Sekar 90+2'	Stadium: Payyanad Stadium; Attendance: 272; Referee: Venkatesh R Man of the Match: Aniket Jadhav (Odisha)

13 April 2023 4	East Bengal	3–3	Hyderabad	Manjeri
20:30 IST	Mahesh 4', 45'; Suhair 17'; Jervis (yellow card) 42'; Kamaljit (yellow card) 73'	Report	Siverio 11', 71' (yellow card) 90'; Rabeeh 83'	Stadium: Payyanad Stadium; Attendance: 3,772; Referee: Rowan Arumughan; Man of the Match: Javier Siverio (Hyderabad)

17 April 2023 5	East Bengal	2–2	Aizawl	Manjeri
17:00 IST	Mahesh 17' (yellow card) 49'; Passi 22'; Golui (yellow card) 61'; Silva (yellow card) 90+6'	Report	H. Lalhruaitluanga 42'; Lalramsanga (yellow card) 45'; D. Lalhlansanga 48'	Stadium: Payyanad Stadium; Attendance: 113; Referee: Venkatesh R Man of the Match: David Lalhlansanga (Aizawl)

17 April 2023 6	Hyderabad	1–2	Odisha	Manjeri
20:30 IST	Siverio 11'; Poojari (yellow card) 39'; Sana (yellow card) 45+3'; Gurmeet (red card) 90+6'	Report	Maurício 55'; Panwar (yellow card) 57'; Rodríguez 86'	Stadium: Payyanad Stadium; Attendance: 1,860; Referee: Pranjal Banerjee; Man of the Match: Diego Maurício (Odisha)

=== Group C ===
Pos	Team	Pld	W	D	L	GF	GA	GD	Pts	Qualification	JAM	FCG	AMB	GOK
1	Jamshedpur	3	3	0	0	11	5	+6	9	Advance to knockout stage	—	—	3–0	3–2
2	Goa	3	2	0	1	5	5	0	6		3–5	—	—	—
3	ATK Mohun Bagan	3	1	0	2	5	5	0	3		—	0–1	—	5–1
4	Gokulam Kerala (H)	3	0	0	3	3	9	−6	0		—	1–0	—	—

Source: AIFF
Rules for classification: 1) points; 2) head-to-head points; 3) head-to-head goal difference; 4) goal difference; 5) number of goals scored; 6) drawing of lots
(H) Hosts

==== Matches ====
10 April 2023 1	ATK Mohun Bagan	5–1	Gokulam Kerala	Kozhikode
17:00 IST	Colaco 6', 27'; Boumous 45'; Manvir 63'; Bose (yellow card) 70'; Nassiri 90+4'	Report	Jassim (yellow card) 38'; Mendigutxia 72'; Bouba (yellow card) 87'	Stadium: EMS Stadium; Attendance: 1,743; Referee: Venkatesh R Man of the Match: Liston Colaco (Mohun Bagan SG)

10 April 2023 2	Goa	3–5	Jamshedpur	Kozhikode
20:30 IST	Sadaoui 6', 70'; Guarrotxena 61'	Report	Chaudhari 11'; Crivellaro 27', 59'; Halder (yellow card) 28'; Arnaout 45+4' (o.g.); Sawyer 82'; Chukwu (yellow card) 90+2'	Stadium: EMS Stadium; Attendance: 2,247; Referee: I Jamal Mohamed; Man of the Match: Rafael Crivellaro (Jamshedpur)

14 April 2023 3	Gokulam Kerala	0–1	Goa	Kozhikode
17:00 IST	Sreekuttan (yellow card) 45+1'; Zaman (yellow card) 72'	Report	Gama (yellow card) 43'; Guarrotxena 90'	Stadium: EMS Stadium; Attendance: 1,274; Referee: Harish Kundu; Man of the Match: Noah Sadaoui (Goa)

14 April 2023 4	Jamshedpur	3–0	ATK Mohun Bagan	Kozhikode
20:30 IST	Boris 22', 43' (yellow card) 66'; Chukwu (yellow card) 33'; Renthlei (yellow card) 58'; Crivellaro (yellow card) 66'; Sabiá (yellow card) 66'; Sawyer 90+3'	Report	Damjanović (yellow card) 36'; Martins (yellow card) 43'	Stadium: EMS Stadium; Attendance: 2,225; Referee: Tejas Visvasrao Nagvenkar; Man of the Match: Pratik Chaudhari (Jamshedpur)

18 April 2023 5	Jamshedpur	3–2	Gokulam Kerala	Kozhikode
17:00 IST	Sawyer 40'; Choudhary 59'; Pandita 69'	Report	S. Konney 33', 62'; Saini (yellow card) 57'; D'Silva (yellow card) 71'	Stadium: EMS Stadium; Attendance: 1,123; Referee: Senthil Nathan Sekaran; Man of the Match: Harry Sawyer (Jamshedpur)

18 April 2023 6	ATK Mohun Bagan	0–1	Goa	Kozhikode
20:30 IST	McHugh (yellow card) 60'; Martins (yellow card) 62'; Khawlhring (yellow card) 87'	Report	Guarrotxena (yellow card) 12'; Tlang (yellow card) 17'; Arnaout 89'	Stadium: EMS Stadium; Attendance: 2,156; Referee: Rowan Arumughan; Man of the Match: Fares Arnaout (Goa)

=== Group D ===
Pos	Team	Pld	W	D	L	GF	GA	GD	Pts	Qualification	NEU	MCI	CHE	CHB
1	NorthEast United	3	2	0	1	10	8	+2	6 (Note: Head-to-head points: NorthEast United 3, Mumbai City 0.)	Advance to knockout stage	—	2–1	—	6–3
2	Mumbai City	3	2	0	1	4	3	+1	6		—	—	1–0	2–1
3	Chennaiyin	3	1	1	1	4	3	+1	4		4–2	—	—	—
4	Churchill Brothers	3	0	1	2	4	8	−4	1		—	—	0–0	—

Source: AIFF
Rules for classification: 1) points; 2) head-to-head points; 3) head-to-head goal difference; 4) goal difference; 5) number of goals scored; 6) drawing of lots

==== Matches ====
11 April 2023 1	Mumbai City	2–1	Churchill Brothers	Manjeri
17:00 IST	Mehtab 27'; Chhangte 90+3' (pen.)	Report	Kromah 9'; A. Gaonkar (yellow card) 26'; Hangshing (yellow card) 84'	Stadium: Payyanad Stadium; Attendance: 553; Referee: Senthil Nathan Sekaran; Man of the Match: Rowllin Borges (Mumbai City)

11 April 2023 2	Chennaiyin	4–2	NorthEast United	Manjeri
20:30 IST	Ali 17', 82' (yellow card) 83'; Jiteshwor (yellow card) 24'; Vanspaul 33'; Düker 50'; Diagne (yellow card) 73'	Report	Saji (yellow card) 22'; Rochharzela 42'; Irshad (yellow card) 68'; Ralte 90+3'	Stadium: Payyanad Stadium; Attendance: 3,264; Referee: Pranjal Banerjee; Man of the Match: Aakash Sangwan (Chennaiyin)

15 April 2023 3	Churchill Brothers	0–0	Chennaiyin	Manjeri
17:00 IST	Costa (yellow card) 66' (yellow-red card) 85'; Hangshing (yellow card) 90+4'	Report	Das (yellow card) 29'; Vanspaul (yellow card) 71'	Stadium: Payyanad Stadium; Attendance: 2,225; Referee: Aditya Purkayastha; Man of the Match: Joseph Clemente (Churchill Brothers)

15 April 2023 4	NorthEast United	2–1	Mumbai City	Manjeri
20:30 IST	Jordán 32' (pen.), 50'; Zoherliana (yellow card) 34'; Tondonba (yellow card) 44'; Benny (yellow card) 71'; Michu (yellow card) 80'	Report	Gurkirat (yellow card) 68'; Apuia 85'; Vikram (yellow card) 89'	Stadium: Payyanad Stadium; Attendance: 4,329; Referee: Pratik Mondal; Man of the Match: Wilmar Jordán (NorthEast United)

19 April 2023 5	NorthEast United	6–3	Churchill Brothers	Kozhikode
20:30 IST	Jordán 27', 43', 51', 70'; A. Kholmurodov (yellow card) 59'; Nigam 78'; Jithin 90+1'	Report	Fernandes 55'; Cháves 60' (yellow card) 71'; Irshad 83' (o.g.); D'Souza (yellow card) 86'	Stadium: EMS Stadium; Attendance: 828; Referee: Rahul Kumar Gupta; Man of the Match: Wilmar Jordán (NorthEast United)

19 April 2023 6	Mumbai City	1–0	Chennaiyin	Manjeri
20:30 IST	A. Chhikara 33'; Apuia (yellow card) 60'; Vikram (yellow card) 72'	Report	Hakhamaneshi (yellow card) 40'; Diagne (yellow card) 45+1'; Karikari (yellow card) 90+1'; Rafique (yellow card) 90+7'	Stadium: Payyanad Stadium; Attendance: 4,617; Referee: Harish Kundu; Man of the Match: Mehtab Singh (Mumbai City)
