= Juan Mera =

Juan Mera may refer to-

- Juan León Mera, Ecuadorian essayist, novelist, politician and painter
- Juan Mera González, Spanish footballer
