= Naocha Singh Huidrom =

Indian footballer

Naocha Singh
Personal information
- Full name: Naocha Singh Huidrom
- Date of birth: 24 August 1999 (age 27)
- Place of birth: Imphal, Manipur, India
- Height: 1.68 m (5 ft 6 in)
- Position: Left-back

Team information
- Current team: Kerala Blasters
- Number: 50

Senior career*
Years	Team	Apps	(Gls)
2017–2018	TRAU	1	(1)
2018–2019	NEROCA	7	(0)
2019–2021	Gokulam Kerala	29	(0)
2021–2024	Mumbai City	0	(0)
2022	→ East Bengal (loan)	5	(0)
2022–2023	→ Punjab (loan)	15	(1)
2023–2024	→ Kerala Blasters (loan)	16	(0)
2024–	Kerala Blasters	33	(0)
- * Club domestic league appearances and goals as of 31 October 2026

Naocha Singh Huidrom (Meitei: Huidrom Naocha Singh, born 24 August 1999) is an Indian professional footballer who plays as a left back for Indian Super League club Kerala Blasters.

== Club career ==
=== TRAU ===
In 2017, he shifted his base from NEROCA to TRAU, who were playing in the second division league.

=== Gokulam Kerala ===
On 6 August 2019, it was announced that Singh signed for Gokulam Kerala in the I-League. He left the club in 2021 after playing for them in two seasons.

=== Mumbai City ===
In 2021, Naocha joined the Indian Super League club Mumbai City FC. He was sent on loan to SC East Bengal in 2022, where he played for them in five games.

=== Roundglass Punjab (loan) ===
In 2022, he was sent on loan to RoundGlass Punjab FC. He emerged as one of the top defenders in the I-League season.

=== Kerala Blasters ===
In July 2023, Naocha was sent on loan to the Indian Super League club Kerala Blasters FC ahead of the 2023–24 season. He made his debut for the club on 13 August 2023 in a 4–3 loss against Gokulam Kerala in the 2023 Durand Cup. On 21 October, he made his debut for the club in the Indian Super League against NorthEast United FC at home which ended in 1–1 draw. Naocha featured in 10 ISL matches in the 2024–25 season, delivering two assists.

In the following season, Naocha was signed on a permanent contract by the Blasters on a one-year deal. He would score his debut goal in the 2024 Durand Cup match against CISF Protectors on 10 August, where he scored the fifth of the night for the team, as the Blasters defeated the CISF 7–0 at 90 minutes. On 12 December, the Blaster s announced the extension of Naocha's contract for three years until 2028.

== Career statistics ==
=== Club ===
As of 12 August 2024

Club	Season	League			Cup		Continental		Others		Total	
Club	Season	Division	Apps	Goals	Apps	Goals	Apps	Goals	Apps	Goals	Apps	Goals
TRAU	2017–18	I-League 2nd Division	0	0	0	0	—		—		0	0
NEROCA	2018–19	I-League	7	0	0	0	—		—		7	0
Gokulam Kerala	2019–20	I-League	14	0	0	0	4 (Note: Appearance(s) in Sheikh Kamal International Club Cup)	0	5 (Note: Appearance(s) in Durand Cup)	0	23	0
Gokulam Kerala	2020–21	I-League	15	0	0	0	—		3 (Note: Appearance(s) in IFA Shield)	0	18	0
Gokulam Kerala	Gokulam Kerala total		29	0	0	0	4	0	8	0	41	0
Mumbai City	2021–22	Indian Super League	0	0	0	0	—		—		0	0
East Bengal (loan)	2021–22	Indian Super League	5	0	0	0	—		—		5	0
RoundGlass Punjab (loan)	2022–23	I-League	15	1	2 (Note: Appearance(s) in Super Cup)	0	—		—		17	1
Kerala Blasters (loan)	2023–24	Indian Super League	16	0	3	0	—		2	0	21	0
Kerala Blasters	2024–25	Indian Super League	22	0	0	0	—		3	1	25	1
Kerala Blasters	2025–26	Indian Super League	9	0	0	0	—		0	0	9	0
Kerala Blasters	Kerala Blasters total		47	0	3	0	—		5	1	55	1
Career total			103	1	13	0	4	0	13	1	133	2

== Honours ==
=== Club ===
Gokulam Kerala

- Durand Cup: 2019
- I-League: 2020–21

Punjab FC

- I-League: 2022–23
