= Juan Nellar =

Argentine footballer (born 1994)

Personal information
- Full name: Juan Carlos Nellar
- Date of birth: 23 January 1994 (age 32)
- Place of birth: San Luis, Argentina
- Height: 1.80 m (5 ft 11 in)
- Position: Midfielder

Team information
- Current team: FC Jove Español San Vicente

Youth career
- –2019: Sportivo Estudiantes

Senior career*
Years	Team	Apps	(Gls)
2019–2020	Vanløse IF	1	(0)
2020	Lorca	8	(0)
2020–2021	Acquedolci		
2021	Fasano	16	(0)
2021–2022	Crema	1	(0)
2022	Sancolombano	18	(3)
2022–2023	Gokulam Kerala	9	(0)
2023	RoundGlass Punjab	6	(1)
2023–2024	Mohammedan	5	(0)
2026-	FC Jove Español San Vicente		
- * Club domestic league appearances and goals as of 14:13, 26 March 2026 (IST)

Juan Carlos Nellar (born 23 January 1994) is an Argentine professional footballer who plays as a midfielder for FC Jove Español San Vicente.

== Club career ==
Born in Argentina, Nellar made his senior debut with Spanish side Lorca FC in the 2019–20 season in the Tercera División RFEF of Spain. He made eight appearances for his side in that season.

Nellar first came to play in India, when he signed for Gokulam Kerala in August 2022. He made nine appearances in the I-League for them before switching to Round Glass Punjab FC in January.

Nellar was given the jersey number 5 in Round Glass Punjab FC. He scored one goal and one assist in the I-League and provided solidity at the middle of the park to the club as they became champions of the 2022–23 I-League.

On 30 November 2023, Nellar joined fellow I-League club Mohammedan.
