= Maheson Singh Tongbram =

Indian footballer (born 2004)

Maheson Singh
Personal information
- Full name: Maheson Mairu
- Date of birth: 26 November 2004 (age 21)
- Place of birth: Manipur, India
- Height: 1.70 m (5 ft 7 in)
- Position: Attacking midfielder

Team information
- Current team: Chennaiyin
- Number: 21

Senior career*
| Years | Team | Apps | (Gls) |
| 2020 | Minerva Punjab B | 3 | (1) |
| 2021–2025 | Punjab | 30 | (2) |
| 2025– | Chennaiyin | 1 | (0) |

International career^{‡}
| 2019 | India U15 | 1 | (0) |
| 2021 | India U16 | 2 | (0) |
| 2022– | India U20 | | |
- * Club domestic league appearances and goals as of 05:00, 18 March 2025 (UTC) ‡ National team caps and goals as of 22:44, 26 January 2022 (UTC)

Maheson Singh Tongbram (Meitei: Tongbram Maheson Singh, born 26 November 2004) is an Indian footballer who plays as a midfielder for Indian Super League club Chennaiyin.

== Career statistics ==
=== Club ===
As of 8 April 2023

| Club | Season | League | | | Cup | | AFC | | Total | |
| Club | Season | Division | Apps | Goals | Apps | Goals | Apps | Goals | Apps | Goals |
|---|---|---|---|---|---|---|---|---|---|---|
| Minerva Punjab B | 2020 | I-League 2nd Division | 3 | 1 | 0 | 0 | — | | 3 | 1 |
| RoundGlass Punjab | 2020–21 | I-League | 1 | 0 | 0 | 0 | — | | 1 | 0 |
| RoundGlass Punjab | 2021–22 | I-League | 18 | 1 | 0 | 0 | — | | 18 | 1 |
| RoundGlass Punjab | 2022–23 | I-League | 10 | 1 | 1 (Note: Appearance(s) in Super Cup) | 0 | — | | 11 | 1 |
| RoundGlass Punjab | 2023–24 | Indian Super League | 0 | 0 | 0 | 0 | — | | 0 | 0 |
| RoundGlass Punjab | Total | | 29 | 2 | 1 | 0 | 0 | 0 | 30 | 2 |
| Career total | | | 32 | 3 | 1 | 0 | 0 | 0 | 33 | 3 |

== Honours ==
India U20

- SAFF U-20 Championship: 2022
