= Staikos Vergetis =

Greek footballer

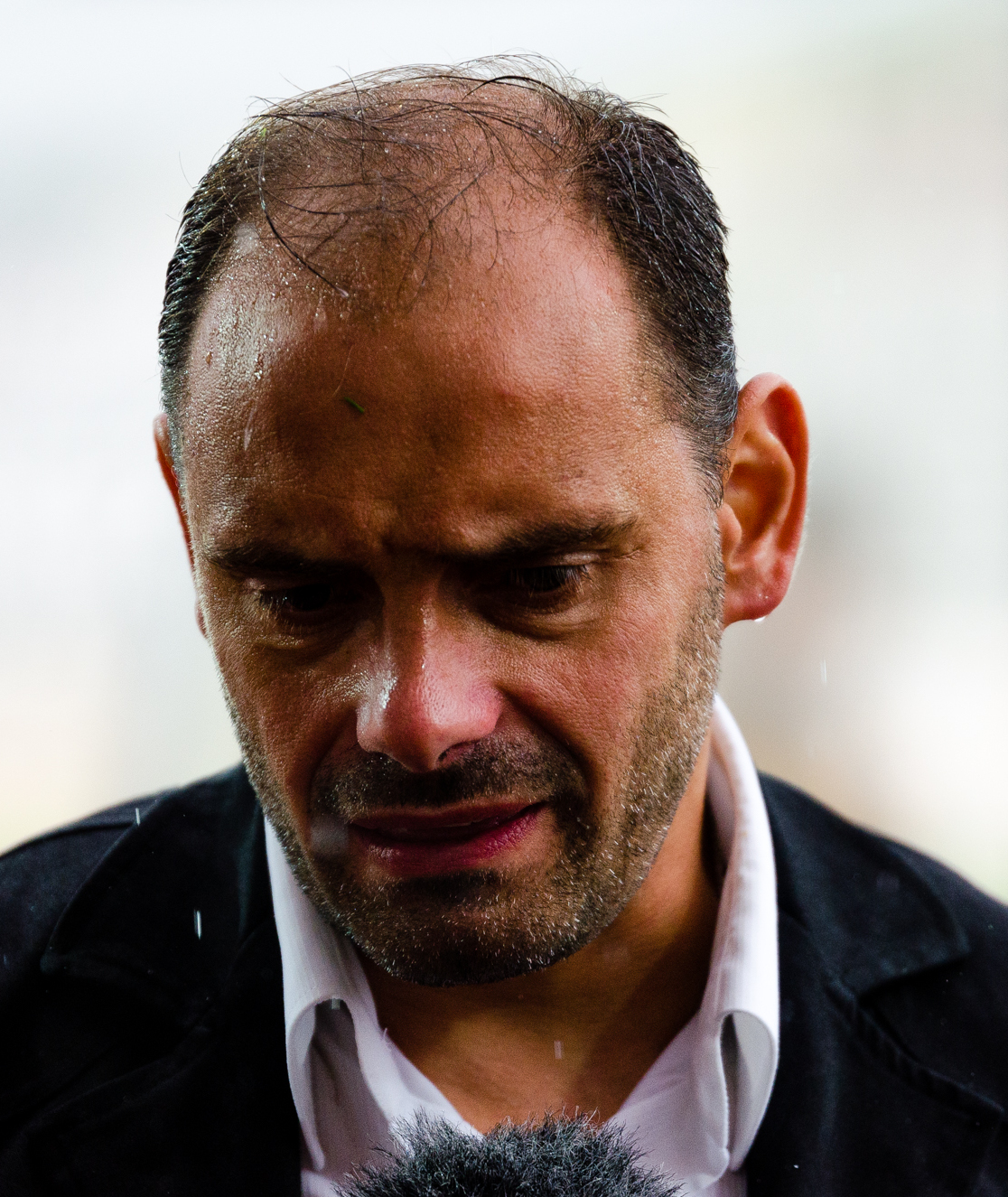
- Vergetis in 2014

Personal information
- Date of birth: 11 July 1976 (age 50)
- Place of birth: Tripoli, Greece

Team information
- Current team: Asteras Tripolis B

Managerial career
- Years: Team
- 2013–2016: Asteras Tripolis
- 2016–2017: Nea Salamina
- 2017–2018: Asteras Tripolis
- 2018–2019: Doxa Drama
- 2019–2021: Niki Volos
- 2021–2022: O.F. Ierapetra
- 2022–2024: Punjab
- 2024–2025: Asteras Tripolis B
- 2025–2026: Asteras Tripolis
- 2026–: Asteras Tripolis B

Staikos Vergetis (Greek: Στάικος Βεργέτης; born 11 July 1976) is a Greek professional football manager.

Vergetis mostly managed Asteras Tripolis in the Super League Greece from 2013 to 2016, having taken the club to the UEFA Europa League group stage twice. He won the I-League with Punjab and became the first head coach to achieve promotion to the Indian Super League.

== Managerial career ==
=== Early career ===
Vergetis graduated in physical education from the University of Athens in 2000. He later oversaw the youth squad of Panelefsiniakos before moving to Asteras Tripolis in a similar role in 2006. He was then promoted to the club's senior set-up after six months with the youth side. He held multiple coaching roles at Asteras and also worked as a multilingual interpreter and game analyst until 2013.

=== Asteras Tripolis ===
Vergetis was appointed as the manager of Asteras Tripolis in October 2013. Asteras finished 5th in the 2013–14 Super League Greece, qualifying for the 2014–15 UEFA Europa League second qualifying round. They won both the second and third qualifying rounds against RoPS and Mainz 05 and qualified for the group stage. Asteras was drawn into Group C with Tottenham Hotspur, Partizan and Beşiktaş. On 2 October 2014, their first ever UEFA Europa League group stage win came against Partizan, as they beat the Serbian club 2–0 at home and briefly topped the group.

Under Vergetis, Asteras achieved their best finish in the Super League Greece, finishing third in the 2014–15 season and directly qualifying for the 2015–16 UEFA Europa League group stage for the first time in the club's history. They finished third in the group stage with one home win against APOEL.

=== OF Ierapetra ===
On 29 June 2021, Greek Football League club OF Ierapetra announced Vergetis as the new manager of the club.

=== Punjab ===
On 8 August 2022, I-League club Punjab FC appointed Vergetis as head coach. He led the club to the 2022–23 I-League title, which ensured their promotion to the 2023–24 Indian Super League. Punjab exited the 2023 Super Cup in the group stage with one win and two losses.

On 19 December 2023, he guided Punjab to their historic first match win in the Indian Super League as they defeated Chennaiyin by 1–0 at home. On 12 February 2024, Punjab achieved their first away win, beating Kerala Blasters 3–1.

He was succeeded by fellow Greek manager Panagiotis Dilmperis for the post in Punjab.

== Managerial statistics ==
As of match played 13 November 2024

Managerial record by team and tenure
Team	Nat	From	To	Record					Ref.
Team	Nat	From	To	P	W	D	L	Win %	Ref.
Asteras Tripolis	(Greece)	3 September 2013	28 January 2016	125	56	30	39	44.80	
Nea Salamina	(Cyprus)	20 September 2016	7 March 2017	25	9	5	11	36.00	
Asteras Tripolis	(Greece)	9 March 2017	10 September 2017	10	1	6	3	10.00	
Doxa Drama	(Greece)	27 July 2018	24 February 2019	19	6	5	8	31.58	
Niki Volos	(Greece)	7 November 2019	13 May 2021	27	10	12	5	37.04	
O.F. Ierapetra	(Greece)	1 July 2021	3 May 2022	32	10	7	15	31.25	
Punjab	(India)	8 August 2022	12 June 2024	50	22	13	15	44.00	
Asteras Tripolis B	(Greece)	8 July 2024	13 November 2024	8	0	3	5	0.00	
Asteras Tripolis (caretaker)	(Greece)	4 September 2024	15 September 2024	1	0	0	1	0.00	
Asteras Tripolis B	(Greece)	4 March 2026	18 June 2026	3	0	1	2	0.00	
Total				300	114	82	104	38.00	

== Honours ==
Punjab FC

- I-League: 2022–23
