= Ashis Pradhan =

Indian footballer (born 1999)

Personal information
- Date of birth: 5 June 1999 (age 27)
- Place of birth: Mellibazar, Sikkim, India
- Position: Central midfielder

Team information
- Current team: Gokulam Kerala
- Number: 11

Youth career
- Namchi Sports Hostel
- 2012–2014: AIFF Regional Academy
- 2014–2017: Jamshedpur

Senior career*
Years	Team	Apps	(Gls)
2018	Indian Arrows	1	(0)
2018–2020	ATK	0	(0)
2020–2021	Garhwal	5	(0)
2021–2026	Punjab	38	(0)
2026–	Gokulam Kerala	0	(0)
- * Club domestic league appearances and goals as of 18:23, 4 March 2023 (UTC)

Ashis Pradhan (born 5 June 1999) is an Indian professional footballer who plays as a central midfielder for Gokulam Kerala.

== Career ==
Born in Sikkim, he hails from a Nepali Newar family. Pradhan started his career in his home state with the Namchi Sports Hostel. In 2012, he was selected to join the AIFF Regional Academy after being successful in a trial. After two years, Pradhan moved to the Tata Football Academy where he graduated from in 2018.

On 2 January 2018, Pradhan appeared on the bench for the first time in his professional career for Indian Arrows, an All India Football Federation I-League development club. On 23 February 2018, Pradhan made his professional debut for the Arrows in a league match against Aizawl. He came on as an 85th-minute substitute for Suresh Singh Wangjam as Indian Arrows lost 3–0.

For the 2018–19 season, Pradhan joined the ATK Reserves before being promoted to the senior squad.

== International ==
Pradhan has been selected for the India under-20 side.

== Career statistics ==
=== Club ===
As of 8 April 2023

Club	Season	League			Cup		AFC		Total	
Club	Season	Division	Apps	Goals	Apps	Goals	Apps	Goals	Apps	Goals
Indian Arrows	2017–18	I-League	1	0	0	0	—		1	0
ATK	2018–19	Indian Super League	0	0	0	0	—		0	0
ATK	2019–20	Indian Super League	0	0	3 (Note: Appearance(s) in Durand Cup)	1	—		3	1
ATK	ATK total		0	0	3	1	0	0	3	1
Garhwal	2020	I-League 2nd Division	5	0	0	0	—		5	0
RoundGlass Punjab	2022–23	I-League	9	0	1 (Note: Appearance(s) in Super Cup)	0	—		10	0
Career total			15	0	4	1	0	0	19	1
