= Suresh Meitei Nongmeikapam =

Indian footballer (born 1994)

Suresh Meitei
Personal information
- Full name: Suresh Meitei Nongmeikapam
- Date of birth: 30 March 1994 (age 32)
- Place of birth: Manipur, India
- Position: Centre-back

Team information
- Current team: Punjab
- Number: 74

Senior career*
Years	Team	Apps	(Gls)
2019–2023	Army Red		
2019–2022	Churchill Brothers	36	(0)
2022–	Punjab	35	(0)
- * Club domestic league appearances and goals as of 19:55, 17 December 2024 (UTC)

Suresh Meitei Nongmeikapam (Meitei: Nongmeikapam Suresh Meitei, born 30 March 1994) is an Indian professional footballer who plays as a centre-back for Indian Super League club Punjab.

== Early life ==
Suresh was born on 30 March 1994 in Indian state of Manipur.

== Career ==
=== Army Red ===
Suresh had featured for Army Red in the 2019 Durand Cup. He served as the captain of the club. Suresh played his first match against I-League side East Bengal on 3 August 2019. The match ended 2–0 in favour of East Bengal. Suresh played his second match against the reserve team of Indian Super League side Bengaluru FC on 5 August 2019. The match finished with the scoreline 1–1 draw. Suresh played his third match for the team against the reserve team of Indian Super League side Jamshedpur FC on 9 August 2019. Suresh scored a brace in the match. The game ended 2–2 after final whistle. Suresh played three matches for Army Red and scored 2 goals for the team.

=== Churchill Brothers ===
==== 2019-20 ====
Suresh signed for I-League side Churchill Brothers on 2019. He featured for the club in 2019-20 I-League season. Suresh played his debut match on 26 January 2020 against Gokulam Kerala F.C. The match ended 1–0 in favour of Gokulam Kerala. Suresh again started in the next match against NEROCA FC on 2 February 2020. The match ended 4–1 with Churchill Brothers taking the victory. He played his third match against Chennai City FC on 9 February 2020. The match ended with scoreline 1–2 with Chennai City taking the victory. Suresh played his last match of the season against Kolkata giants East Bengal on 29 February 2019 where he started as a substitute for Glan Martins in the 66th minute of the game. Suresh was booked in the stoppage time. The match ended in a 1–1 draw. Suresh appeared in 4 matches in total for Churchill Brothers at the end of the season.

==== 2020-21 ====
Suresh stayed at Churchill Brothers for the 2020-21 I-League season. Suresh started in the lineup in the clubs' first match of the season against Indian Arrows on 10 January 2021, which they ended up winning 2–5.

== Career statistics ==
=== Club ===
As of 17 December 2024

Club	Season	League			Cup		AFC		Total	
Club	Season	Division	Apps	Goals	Apps	Goals	Apps	Goals	Apps	Goals
Army Red	2019	–	0	0	3 (Note: Appearance(s) in Durand Cup)	2	–		3	2
Army Red	2021	–	0	0	3	1	–		3	1
Army Red	2022	–	0	0	4	1	–		4	1
Army Red	2023	–	0	0	4	1	–		4	1
Army Red	Total		0	0	14	5	0	0	14	5
Churchill Brothers	2019–20	I-League	4	0	0	0	–		4	0
Churchill Brothers	2020–21	I-League	15	0	0	0	–		15	0
Churchill Brothers	2021–22	I-League	17	0	0	0	–		17	0
Churchill Brothers	Total		36	0	0	0	0	0	36	0
Punjab	2022–23	I-League	10	0	3 (Note: Appearance(s) in Super Cup)	0	–		13	0
Punjab	2023–24	Indian Super League	14	0	2	0	–		16	0
Punjab	2024–25	Indian Super League	11	0	4	0	–		15	0
Punjab	Total		35	0	9	0	0	0	44	0
Career total			71	0	23	5	0	0	94	5
