= Brandon Vanlalremdika =

Indian footballer (born 1994)

Personal information
- Date of birth: 28 January 1994 (age 32)
- Place of birth: Mizoram, India
- Positions: Attacking midfielder; winger

Team information
- Current team: Sreenidi Deccan

Senior career*
Years	Team	Apps	(Gls)
2016–2017	Aizawl	25	(4)
2017–2020	East Bengal	40	(3)
2021	Aizawl	12	(3)
2021–2022	Mohammedan	18	(2)
2022–2024	Punjab	30	(2)
2024–	Sreenidi Deccan	0	(0)
- * Club domestic league appearances and goals as of 23:33, 26 December 2023 (UTC)

Brandon Vanlalremdika (born 28 January 1994) is an Indian professional footballer who plays as a midfielder or winger for I-League club Sreenidi Deccan.

== Club career ==
Born in Mizoram, Vanlalremdika started his career with Aizawl. He was one of the goalscorers in the I-League 2nd Division match that saw Aizawl promoted to the I-League when they beat Chanmari 4–2.

Vanlalremdika made his professional debut for Aizawl in the I-League on 9 January 2016 against the reigning champions, Mohun Bagan. He played 80 minutes before coming off as Aizawl lost 3–1.

In 2021, he joined Kolkata-side Mohammedan Sporting. Under Nikola Stojanović's captaincy, Brandon and his team Mohammedan for the first time, ran for their maiden national league title in 2021–22 I-League season, but finished as runners-up after a 2–1 defeat to Gokulam Kerala at the end.

== Career statistics ==
=== Club ===
As of 21 January 2024

Club	Season	League			Cup		Other		AFC		Total	
Club	Season	Division	Apps	Goals	Apps	Goals	Apps	Goals	Apps	Goals	Apps	Goals
Aizawl	2015–16	I-League	11	1	1 (Note: Appearance(s) in Super Cup)	0	—		—		12	1
Aizawl	2016–17	I-League	14	3	3	0	—		—		17	3
Aizawl	Total		25	4	4	0	0	0	0	0	29	4
East Bengal	2017–18	I-League	9	1	0	0	8 (Note: Appearance(s) in Calcutta Football League)	2	—		17	3
East Bengal	2018–19	I-League	19	1	0	0	9	1	—		28	2
East Bengal	2019–20	I-League	12	1	4 (Note: Appearance(s) in Durand Cup)	0	7	0	—		23	1
East Bengal	Total		40	3	4	0	24	3	0	0	68	6
Aizawl	2020–21	I-League	12	3	0	0	—		—		12	3
Mohammedan	2021–22	I-League	18	2	6	2	—		—		24	4
Punjab	2022–23	I-League	20	2	3	0	—		—		23	2
Punjab	2023–24	Indian Super League	10	0	2	0	2	0	—		14	0
Punjab	Total		30	2	5	0	2	0	0	0	37	2
Sreenidi Deccan	2023–24	I-League	0	0	0	0	—		—		0	0
Career total			125	14	19	2	26	3	0	0	170	19

== Honours ==
Aizawl FC

- I-League
  - Champions (1): 2016–17

Mohammedan Sporting

- Calcutta Football League: 2021
- I-League
  - Runners up (1): 2021–22

Punjab FC

- I-League
  - Champions (1): 2022-23
