= Ranjeet Pandre =

Indian footballer (born 1995)

Personal information
- Full name: Ranjeet Singh Pandre
- Date of birth: 4 January 1995 (age 31)
- Place of birth: Rajnandgaon, Chhattisgarh, India
- Height: 1.78 m (5 ft 10 in)
- Position: Striker

Youth career
- Union Bank of India

Senior career*
Years	Team	Apps	(Gls)
2018–2021	Chennai City	17	(1)
2021–2023	Mumbai Kenkre	43	(7)
2023	Church Boys United	0	(0)
2023–2026	Punjab	5	(0)
2024–2025	→ Gokulam Kerala (loan)	9	(1)
- * Club domestic league appearances and goals as of 23:22, 2 May 2026 (UTC)

Ranjeet Singh Pandre (born 4 January 1995) is an Indian professional footballer who plays as a forward.

== Career ==
=== India ===
Ranjeet lanky striker, joined Union Bank of India (UBI) 2017–18 season. Ranjeet played an instrumental role in UBI's terrific season who also finished as the runner-up in the RCF Nadkarni Cup 2018, losing to Air India in the last minute. Ranjeet also went out to represent Maharashtra football team in the Santosh Trophy where he was their top-scorer. Ranjeet's superb form and consistency earned him the best striker award for the MDFA Elite Division in the MDFA Awards Night 2018.

He made his professional debut for the Chennai City against Aizawl on 18 January 2019, He was brought in the 90th minute as Chennai City won 4–3.

=== Nepal ===
In March 2023, Pandre moved abroad and joined Nepali Martyr's Memorial A-Division League club Church Boys United. He was part of the team that clinched Simara Gold Cup in April.

== Career statistics ==
=== Club ===
As of 11 March 2023

Club	Season	League			Cup		AFC		Total	
Club	Season	Division	Apps	Goals	Apps	Goals	Apps	Goals	Apps	Goals
Chennai City	2018–19	I-League	5	0	1 (Note: Appearance(s) in Super Cup)	0	–		6	0
Chennai City	2019–20	I-League	5	0	3 (Note: Appearance(s) in Durand Cup)	0	1 (Note: Appearance(s) in AFC Champions League)	0	9	0
Chennai City	2020–21	I-League	7	1	0	0	–		7	1
Chennai City	Total		17	1	4	0	1	0	22	1
Mumbai Kenkre	2021	I-League 2nd Division	6	1	0	0	–		6	1
Mumbai Kenkre	2021–22	I-League	15	3	0	0	–		15	3
Mumbai Kenkre	2022–23	I-League	22	3	0	0	–		22	3
Mumbai Kenkre	Total		43	7	0	0	0	0	43	7
Punjab	2023–24	Indian Super League	0	0	0	0	–		0	0
Career total			60	8	4	0	1	0	65	8

== Honours ==
Church Boys United

- Simara Gold Cup: 2023
