= Krishananda Singh Khungdongbam =

Indian footballer (born 1996)

Krishananda Singh
Personal information
- Full name: Krishananda Singh Khungdongbam
- Date of birth: 1 February 1996 (age 30)
- Place of birth: Heirok, Manipur, India
- Height: 1.78 m (5 ft 10 in)
- Position: Winger

Team information
- Current team: SC Bengaluru
- Number: 7

Senior career*
| Years | Team | Apps | (Gls) |
| 2018–2021 | TRAU | 38 | (3) |
| 2021 | Gokulam Kerala | | |
| 2021–2022 | TRAU | 16 | (1) |
| 2022–2024 | Punjab | 29 | (2) |
| 2024– | SC Bengaluru | 3 | (0) |
- * Club domestic league appearances and goals as of 16:20, 6 December 2024 (IST)

Krishananda Singh Khungdongbam (Meitei: Khungdongbam Krishananda Singh, born 1 February 1996) is an Indian professional footballer who plays as a winger for an I-League club, SC Bengaluru.

== Career ==
=== TRAU ===
Singh started his career with I-League 2nd Division side TRAU in 2018.

=== Gokulam Kerala FC ===
On 25 June 2021, it was announced that Singh signed for Gokulam Kerala in the I-League.

== Career statistics ==
=== Club ===
As of 6 December 2024

| Club | Season | League | | | Cup | | AFC | | Total | |
| Club | Season | Division | Apps | Goals | Apps | Goals | Apps | Goals | Apps | Goal |
|---|---|---|---|---|---|---|---|---|---|---|
| TRAU | 2018–19 | I-League 2nd Division | 14 | 0 | 0 | 0 | – | | 14 | 0 |
| TRAU | 2019–20 | I-League | 16 | 3 | 2 (Note: Appearance(s) in Durand Cup) | 0 | – | | 18 | 3 |
| TRAU | 2020–21 | I-League | 8 | 0 | 0 | 0 | – | | 8 | 0 |
| TRAU | TRAU total | | 38 | 3 | 2 | 0 | 0 | 0 | 40 | 3 |
| Gokulam Kerala | 2021–22 | I-League | 0 | 0 | 0 | 0 | – | | 0 | 0 |
| TRAU | 2021–22 | I-League | 16 | 1 | 0 | 0 | – | | 16 | 1 |
| Punjab | 2022–23 | I-League | 18 | 1 | 3 (Note: Appearance(s) in Super Cup) | 1 | – | | 21 | 2 |
| Punjab | 2023–24 | Indian Super League | 11 | 1 | 3 | 0 | – | | 14 | 1 |
| Punjab | Total | | 29 | 2 | 6 | 1 | 0 | 0 | 35 | 3 |
| SC Bengaluru | 2024-25 | I-League | 3 | 0 | | | | | | |
| Career total | | | 83 | 6 | 8 | 1 | 0 | 0 | 91 | 7 |

== Honours ==
TRAU

- I-League 2nd Division

Champions (gold) : 2018–19
