= Kingslee Fernandes =

Indian footballer (born 1998)

Personal information
- Date of birth: 26 January 1998 (age 28)
- Place of birth: Betalbatim, Goa, India
- Height: 1.67 m (5 ft 5 1/2 in)
- Position: Attacking midfielder

Team information
- Current team: Churchill Brothers
- Number: 8

Youth career
- Vasco

Senior career*
| Years | Team | Apps | (Gls) |
| 2015–2016 | Vasco | | |
| 2016–2017 | Churchill Brothers | 5 | (0) |
| 2017–2020 | Goa B | 19 | (0) |
| 2020–2023 | Churchill Brothers | 53 | (1) |
| 2023–2024 | Punjab | 7 | (0) |
| 2024–2025 | Churchill Brothers | 16 | (1) |
| 2025 | Chennaiyin | 0 | (0) |
| 2026 | Gokulam Kerala | 6 | (0) |
| 2026– | Churchill Brothers | 3 | (0) |
- * Club domestic league appearances and goals as of 5 November 2026

Kingslee Fernandes (born 26 January 1998) is an Indian professional footballer who plays as a midfielder for Indian Super League club Churchill Brothers.

== Career ==
Born in Goa, Fernandes started his career with Vasco, playing for their youth side. Fernandes also played for the Vasco senior side in the Goa Professional League. Fernandes was also selected for the Goa side that would participate in the Santosh Trophy but for unknown reasons, did not appear at training camp.

=== Churchill Brothers ===
In December 2016 it was revealed that Fernandes had signed with Churchill Brothers for the club's return to the I-League. He made his professional debut for the side on 8 January 2017 in their opening match against Mohun Bagan. Despite his side losing 1–0, Fernandes still played the full match and earned the Hero of the Match award for his performance.

=== FC Goa ===
Fernandes then joined the reserves side of FC Goa.

He was promoted to the senior team in the year 2019.

== Career statistics ==
=== Club ===
As of 31 August 2025

| Club | Season | League | | | Cup | | Other | | AFC | | Total | |
| Club | Season | Division | Apps | Goals | Apps | Goals | Apps | Goals | Apps | Goals | Apps | Goals |
|---|---|---|---|---|---|---|---|---|---|---|---|---|
| Churchill Brothers | 2016–17 | I-League | 5 | 0 | 0 | 0 | – | | – | | 5 | 0 |
| Goa B | 2017–18 | I-League 2nd Division | 10 | 0 | 0 | 0 | – | | – | | 10 | 0 |
| Goa B | 2018–19 | I-League 2nd Division | 8 | 0 | 0 | 0 | – | | – | | 8 | 0 |
| Goa B | 2019–20 | I-League 2nd Division | 1 | 0 | 0 | 0 | – | | – | | 1 | 0 |
| Goa B | Total | | 19 | 0 | 0 | 0 | 0 | 0 | 0 | 0 | 19 | 0 |
| Goa | 2019–20 | Indian Super League | 0 | 0 | 3 (Note: Appearance(s) in Durand Cup) | 0 | – | | – | | 3 | 0 |
| Churchill Brothers | 2020–21 | I-League | 15 | 0 | 0 | 0 | – | | – | | 15 | 1 |
| Churchill Brothers | 2021–22 | I-League | 17 | 1 | 0 | 0 | – | | – | | 17 | 1 |
| Churchill Brothers | 2022–23 | I-League | 21 | 0 | 4 (Note: Appearance(s) in Super Cup) | 1 | 3 (Note: Appearance(s) in Baji Rout Cup) | 1 | – | | 28 | 2 |
| Churchill Brothers | Total | | 53 | 1 | 4 | 1 | 3 | 1 | 0 | 0 | 60 | 3 |
| Punjab | 2023–24 | Indian Super League | 7 | 0 | 1 | 0 | – | | – | | 8 | 0 |
| Punjab | 2024–25 | Indian Super League | 0 | 0 | 1 | 0 | – | | – | | 1 | 0 |
| Punjab | Total | | 7 | 0 | 2 | 0 | 0 | 0 | 0 | 0 | 9 | 0 |
| Churchill Brothers | 2024–25 | I-League | 16 | 1 | 0 | 0 | – | | – | | 16 | 1 |
| Chennaiyin | 2025–26 | Indian Super League | 0 | 0 | 3 | 0 | – | | – | | 3 | 0 |
| Career total | | | 100 | 2 | 12 | 1 | 3 | 1 | 0 | 0 | 115 | 4 |

== Honours ==
Churchill Brothers

- Baji Rout Cup runner-up: 2022
