= Juan Mera (footballer) =

Spanish footballer (born 1993)

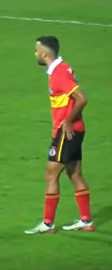
- Mera with East Bengal in 2019

Personal information
- Full name: Juan Mera González
- Date of birth: 22 November 1993 (age 32)
- Place of birth: Gijón, Spain
- Height: 1.74 m (5 ft 8 1/2 in)
- Positions: Attacking midfielder; winger

Youth career
- 2001–2002: Antonio Machado
- 2002–2003: Roces
- 2003–2010: Sporting Gijón

Senior career*
Years	Team	Apps	(Gls)
2010–2016	Sporting B	155	(21)
2016–2017	Celta B	34	(3)
2017–2018	Racing Ferrol	23	(1)
2018–2019	Teruel	11	(0)
2019	Leioa	7	(0)
2019–2020	East Bengal	16	(2)
2020–2021	Lealtad	20	(0)
2021–2022	NEROCA	10	(2)
2022–2024	Punjab	35	(12)
2024–2025	Churchill Brothers	5	(0)
2025	Dempo	7	(2)
2026	Persiraja Banda Aceh	9	(3)
2026	Persis Solo	0	(0)
- * Club domestic league appearances and goals as of 19 April 2026

Juan Mera González (born 22 November 1993) is a Spanish professional footballer who plays as an attacking midfielder.

== Club career ==
=== Spain ===
Born in Gijón, Asturias, he made his senior debut with Sporting de Gijón B in the 2010–11 season. Juan played his first match on 29 August 2010 against Gimnástica Torrelavega He played for Sporting B, in Segunda División B, till 2015–16 season. He scored 21 goals. In 2016–17, he was promoted to Sporting Gijón.

After that he joined Celta Vigo B, Racing Ferrol, Teruel, and Leioa in Spain till 2018–19 and played in Segunda División B.

=== India ===
On 24 August 2019, Juan pursued a one-year deal and moved to Indian club, East Bengal FC. On 12 September, he played his first match for the club in Calcutta Football League, against Kalighat MS.

He made his professional league debut on 4 December 2019 in I-League, in match against Real Kashmir FC He assisted a goal and was also named Man of the Match.

In 2021, he moved to another I-League side NEROCA and made his debut for the club on 27 December in their 3–2 win against Sreenidi Deccan.

In September 2022, he signed for another I-League club RoundGlass Punjab. The club later clinched its second I-League title in 2022–23 season and gained promotion to 2023–24 Indian Super League.

== Career statistics ==
=== Club ===
As of 19 April 2026

Club	Season	League			National cup (Note: Includes Copa del Rey, Super Cup)		Other		Total	
Club	Season	Division	Apps	Goals	Apps	Goals	Apps	Goals	Apps	Goals
Sporting B	2010–11	Segunda División B	26	1	—		—		26	1
Sporting B	2011–12	Segunda División B	13	0	—		—		13	0
Sporting B	2012–13	Segunda División B	20	1	—		—		20	1
Sporting B	2013–14	Segunda División B	27	8	—		—		27	8
Sporting B	2014–15	Segunda División B	35	7	—		—		35	7
Sporting B	2015–16	Segunda División B	34	4	—		—		34	4
Sporting B	Total		155	21	0	0	0	0	155	21
Celta B	2016–17	Segunda División B	32	2	—		2 (Note: Appearance(s) in Promotion Playoffs)	1	34	3
Racing Ferrol	2017–18	Segunda División B	23	1	1	0	—		24	1
Teruel	2018–19	Segunda División B	11	0	1	0	—		12	0
Leioa	2018–19	Segunda División B	7	0	0	0	—		7	0
East Bengal	2019–20	I-League	16	2	0	0	5 (Note: Appearance(s) in Calcutta Football League)	0	21	2
CD Lealtad	2020–21	Segunda División B	20	0	1	0	—		21	0
NEROCA	2021–22	I-League	10	2	0	0	—		10	2
Punjab	2022–23	I-League	18	10	3	0	—		21	10
Punjab	2023–24	Indian Super League	17	2	3	0	3 (Note: Appearance(s) in Durand Cup)	0	23	2
Punjab	Total		35	12	6	0	3	0	44	12
Churchill Brothers	2024–25	I-League	5	0	0	0	—		5	0
Dempo SC	2024–25	I-League	7	2	0	0	—		7	2
Persiraja Banda Aceh	2025–26	Championship	9	3	0	0	—		9	3
Career total			329	45	9	0	10	1	349	45

== Honours ==
RoundGlass Punjab

- I-League: 2022–23

Individual

- I-League Best Midfielder of the Season: 2022–23
