= 2026–27 Kerala Blasters FC season =

Kerala Blasters
2026–27 season
- Owner: Al Fursan Sports Investment
- Chairman: Ahmad bin Faisal Al Qasimi
- Head coach: Ashley Westwood
- Stadium: Jawaharlal Nehru Stadium, Kochi
- Indian Super League: 9th
- Top goalscorer: Vibin Mohanan; Andre Green; Momo Yansané (1)
- Average home league attendance: 40,014
- Biggest win: Inter Kashi 0–2 Kerala Blasters (11 October 2026)
- Biggest defeat: NorthEast United 4–1 Kerala Blasters (18 October 2026)
Home colours	Away colours	Third colours
- All statistics correct as of 31 October 2026.

The 2026–27 season is the thirteenth season in Kerala Blasters FC's existence, as well as their thirteenth season in the Indian Super League. The season began in October 2026, with the club competing in the Indian Super League.

This season marks the beginning of a new era for Kerala Blasters following the agreement by UAE-based Al Fursan Sports Investment to acquire the club from Magnum Sports Private Limited. Following the change in management, the club underwent a significant squad rebuild. Former captain Adrián Luna returned after spending the previous season away on loan, while Ashley Westwood continued as head coach.

== Background ==
Kerala Blasters entered the 2026–27 season following a heavily disrupted 2025–26 campaign, which was affected by prolonged uncertainty surrounding Indian football. The crisis began with the expiry of the commercial agreement between the All India Football Federation (AIFF) and Football Sports Development Limited (FSDL). The resulting uncertainty affected clubs across the country, contributing to financial difficulties, the suspension of team operations and the departure of several foreign players from Indian football.

Kerala Blasters were also affected by the crisis, with several key players leaving the club. Captain Adrián Luna and Noah Sadaoui departed on loan during the season, while further transfers and replacements took place during the mid-season transfer window.

The club also endured a difficult campaign on the pitch. Under head coach David Català, Kerala Blasters failed to progress beyond the group stage of the Super Cup, despite making a strong start to the competition. The delayed 2025–26 Indian Super League season proved particularly challenging, with the team earning just one point from its first seven matches. Following six matches under Català, he was dismissed and replaced by Ashley Westwood.

Although Westwood lost his first match in charge, Kerala Blasters subsequently went unbeaten in their final six league matches, recording five wins and one draw. The club finished eighth in the league table with 17 points, of which 16 were earned during its final six matches.

== Pre-season ==
=== Financial difficulties and ownership change ===
Kerala Blasters faced financial and organisational uncertainty ahead of the 2026–27 season. In July 2026, the club's owners, Magnum Sports Private Limited, were reported to be seeking a buyer amid financial difficulties. The situation was accompanied by significant changes to the playing squad, with several foreign and domestic players leaving the club ahead of the new campaign. Departures included Noah Sadaoui as well as important domestic players including Sachin Suresh and Nihal Sudeesh.

On 29 September 2026, Kerala Blasters announced that Magnum Sports had entered into a definitive agreement to sell its entire stake in the club to UAE-based Al Fursan Sports Investment Group. The transfer of ownership would take place in phases over eight months. As part of the transition, Kerala-based sports management company Ofioh Sporty India Private Limited was appointed as the club's operational partner, overseeing its day-to-day commercial and operational activities.

=== Squad rebuilding and pre-season preparations ===
Following the ownership announcement, Kerala Blasters undertook a major restructuring of their playing squad. Ashley Westwood, who had been appointed head coach in March 2026, continued in the role for the new season. The team began its pre-season preparations at the FC Madras facility in Mahabalipuram on 30 September 2026.

The club signed four foreign players ahead of the campaign: English winger Andre Green, English defender James Bolton, Guinean striker Momo Yansané and Montenegrin midfielder Nebojša Kosović. The club also recruited Indian players including goalkeeper Amrinder Singh, midfielder Mohammad Yasir and forward Mohammed Sanan, among others.

Former captain Adrián Luna returned after spending the previous season on loan at Persik Kediri. The club also announced contract extensions for defenders Aiban Dohling and Fallou Ndiaye. Ebindas Yesudasan's contract was also extended till 2028.. The club also appointed former Manchester United academy manager Hasney Aljofree as assistant coach.

== Season overview ==

The Blasters' starting line-up for their first home match of the league season against Mumbai City on 25 October 2026.

=== Winning start ===
Kerala Blasters began their 2026–27 season with a 2–0 away win against the all-Indian Inter Kashi side on 11 October 2026. Vibin Mohanan, who captained the side, scored the club's first goal of the season from an assist by Korou Singh. Andre Green, making his debut for both Kerala Blasters and in the Indian Super League, scored the second goal, assisted by fellow debutant Mohammed Sanan. Sumit Sharma, James Bolton, Nebojša Kosović, Paul Ramfangzauva and Momo Yansané also made their first appearances for the club in the match.

=== Winless run ===
However, Kerala Blasters could not maintain their winning form, falling 4–1 to NorthEast United FC on 18 October 2026, with Alaaeddine Ajaraie scoring a brace for the hosts. Momo Yansané scored his first goal for the club in his first start, assisted by Adrián Luna, who made his first appearance for Kerala Blasters since returning from his loan spell. The defeat ended the Blasters' seven-match unbeaten run in the league.

Kerala Blasters played their first home match of the 2026–27 season against Mumbai City on 25 October 2026, in front of a sold-out crowd of 40,014 spectators at the Jawaharlal Nehru Stadium in Kochi. The attendance marked the club's highest home attendance since the 2016 Indian Super League final. Despite a combined 30 shots from both teams, the match ended in a goalless draw. Amrinder Singh made his first appearance for Kerala Blasters, kept a clean sheet and was named Player of the Match.

Kerala Blasters travelled to Chennai to face Chennaiyin FC in the Southern Derby on 31 October 2026. The match ended in another goalless draw, with Adrián Luna missing a penalty in the 51st minute after his effort struck the post. Both teams were reduced to ten men in stoppage time after Chennaiyin's Emmanuel Imanishimwe and Kerala Blasters' Andre Green were sent off following an on-field altercation.

== Players ==
As of 31 October 2026

=== First-team squad ===
Notes:

- Table below mentions the squad registered by the club for the 2026–27 Indian Super League season.
- Flags indicate national team as defined under FIFA eligibility rules. Players may hold more than one non-FIFA nationality.

No.	Name	Nat.	Pos.	Footedness	Date of Birth (Age)	Height	Last Club	Transfer Fee	Signed	Contract Till
Goalkeepers
1	Amrinder Singh	(India)	GK	Right	27 May 1993 (age 33)	1.87 m	(India) Odisha	Free transfer	2026	2027
31	Arsh Anwer Shaikh	(India)	GK	Right	9 July 2002 (age 24)	1.88 m	(India) Mohun Bagan	Free transfer	2025	2028
81	Alsabith ST	(India)	GK	Right	1 July 2007 (age 19)	1.80 m	Youth System	N/A	N/A	2027
Defenders
3	Sandeep Singh	(India)	RB/CB/LB	Right	1 March 1995 (age 31)	1.79 m	(India) TRAU FC	Free transfer	2020	2027
4	Hormipam Ruivah	(India)	CB	Right	25 January 2001 (age 25)	1.83 m	(India) RoundGlass Punjab FC	Free transfer	2021	2027
5	Sumit Sharma	(India)	CB	Right	5 March 2007 (age 19)	1.83 m	(India) Classic FA	Free transfer	2025	2028
13	James Bolton	(England)	CB	Right	13 August 1994 (age 32)	1.88 m	(England) Fleetwood Town	Free transfer	2026	2027
19	Jaganath Jayan	(India)	LB/RB	Right	27 June 2005 (age 21)		Youth System	NA	2026	2027
27	Aibanbha Dohling	(India)	LB/CB	Right	23 March 1996 (age 30)	1.76 m	(India) FC Goa	₹1.45 crore (US$174,000)	2023	2027
33	Bikash Yumnam	(India)	CB	Right	6 September 2003 (age 23)	1.83 m	(India) Chennaiyin	Free transfer	2025	2029
44	Fallou Ndiaye	(Senegal)	CB	Right	10 November 2001 (age 25)	1.98 m	(Finland) SJK	Free transfer	2026	2027
50	Naocha Singh	(India)	LB	Left	24 August 1999 (age 27)	1.68 m	(India) Mumbai City FC	Free transfer	2023	2028
55	Amey Ranawade	(India)	RB	Right	7 March 1998 (age 28)	1.67 m	(India) Mumbai City FC	Free transfer	2025	2030
Midfielders
6	Freddy Lallawmawma	(India)	CDM	Right	27 July 2002 (age 24)	1.71 m	(India) Punjab FC	Undisclosed fee	2023	2027
8	Vibin Mohanan	(India)	CM	Right	6 February 2003 (age 23)	1.73 m	Youth System	N/A	2022	2029
10	Adrián Luna (Captain)	(Uruguay)	AM/LW/CM/CF	Right	12 March 1992 (age 34)	1.67 m (5 ft 6 in)	(Australia) Melbourne City FC	Free transfer	2021	2027
15	Sahil Tavora	(India)	DM	Right	19 October 1995 (age 31)	1.80 m	(India) Goa	Free transfer	2026	2027
16	Paul Ramfangzauva	(India)	CM	Right	26 March 1999 (age 27)	1.78 m	(India) Diamond Harbour	Free transfer	2026	2028
23	Nebojša Kosović	(Montenegro)	CM	Right	24 February 1995 (age 31)	1.78 m	(Thailand) Bangkok United	Free transfer	2026	2027
24	Joel Lalramengmawia	(India)	MF	Right	1 August 2006 (age 20)		(India) Chanmari	Free transfer	2026	2029
47	Ebindas Yesudasan	(India)	AM	Right	19 April 2005 (age 21)	1.75 m	Youth System	NA	2026	2028
Forwards
7	Korou Singh	(India)	LM/LW	Right	3 December 2006 (age 19)	1.67 m	Youth System	N/A	2024	2029
9	Andre Green	(England)	FW	Right	26 June 1998 (age 28)	1.80 m	AVS	Free Transfer	2026	2027
11	Mohammed Sanan	(India)	WF	Right	5 April 2004 (age 22)	1.66 m	Jamshedpur	Free Transfer	2026	2029
32	Mohammad Yasir	(India)	AM	Left	14 April 1998 (age 28)	1.69 m	FC Goa	Free Transfer	2026	2027
45	Sreekuttan M.S.	(India)	CF	Right	30 November 2004 (age 21)	1.81 m	Youth System	N/A	2023	2027
46	Ramhlunchhunga	(India)	WF	Right	24 April 2001 (age 25)	1.69 m	SC Delhi	Free Transfer	2026	2028
99	Momo Yansané	(Guinea)	FW	Right	29 July 1997 (age 29)	1.83 m	Pyunik	Free Transfer	2026	2027

=== Squad composition ===
Position	Number of players					
Position	Home grown	Non-home grown	Local	Domestic	Foreign	Total
Goalkeepers	1	2	1	2	0	3
Defenders	1	9	1	7	2	10
Midfielders	2	6	2	4	2	8
Forwards	2	5	2	3	2	7
All	6	22	6	16	6	28

== Transfers ==
=== Transfers In ===
Date	Player	No.	Position(s)	Last Club	Contract Length	Transfer window	Fee	Refs.
03 October 2026	(India) Amrinder Singh	1	GK	(India) Odisha	1 year	Pre-season	Free transfer	
04 October 2026	(India) Mohammad Yasir	32	AM	(India) Goa	1 year	Pre-season	Free transfer	
04 October 2026	(India) Ramhlunchhunga	46	WF	(India) SC Delhi	2 years	Pre-season	Free transfer	
05 October 2026	(India) Mohammed Sanan	11	WF	(India) Jamshedpur	3 years	Pre-season	Free transfer	
06 October 2026	(India) Paul Ramfangzauva	16	CM	(India) Diamond Harbour	2 years	Pre-season	Free transfer	
06 October 2026	(England) Andre Green	9	FW	(Portugal) AVS	1 year	Pre-season	Free transfer	
07 October 2026	(England) James Bolton	13	CB	(England) Fleetwood Town	1 year	Pre-season	Free transfer	
07 October 2026	(Montenegro) Nebojša Kosović	23	CM	(Thailand) Bangkok United	1 year	Pre-season	Free transfer	
08 October 2026	(India) Joel Lalramengmawia	24	MF	(India) Chanmari	3 years	Pre-season	Free transfer	
08 October 2026	(Guinea) Momo Yansané	99	FW	(Armenia) Pyunik	1 year	Pre-season	Free transfer	
09 October 2026	(India) Sahil Tavora	15	DM	(India) Goa	1 year	Pre-season	Free transfer	

=== Loan Returns ===
Player	No.	Position(s)	From
(India) Likmabam Rakesh	—	LB	(India) Punjab FC
(India) Mohammed Arbaz	21	GK	(India) Diamond Harbour
(Morocco) Noah Sadaoui	7	WF	(Indonesia) Dewa United
(Uruguay) Adrián Luna	10	MF	(Indonesia) Persik Kediri
(India) Amey Ranawade	55	DF	(India) Mohun Bagan

=== Contract Extensions ===
Date	Player	No.	Position(s)	Contract Till	Refs.
8 October 2026	(India) Ebindas Yesudasan	47	AM	2028	
9 October 2026	(Senegal) Fallou Ndiaye	44	CB	2027	
10 October 2026	(India) Aibanbha Dohling	27	LB/CB	2027	

=== Transfers Out ===
Exit Date	Player	No.	Position(s)	To	Transfer window	Fee	Refs.
26 June 2026	(Germany) Marlon Roos-Trujillo	10	AM	(Germany) Posavina Frankfurt	Pre-season	Free transfer	
9 July 2026	(India) Danish Farooq Bhat	13	LM	(India) East Bengal	Pre-season	Free transfer	
26 July 2026	(India) Muhammed Saheef	5	LB	(India) Chennaiyin	Pre-season	Free transfer	
26 July 2026	(Spain) Víctor Bertomeu	7	CF	(Iceland) Þór Akureyri	Pre-season	Free transfer	
29 July 2026	(Argentina) Franchu	23	AM	(India) Goa	Pre-season	Free transfer	
1 August 2026	(India) Muhammad Ajsal	19	CF	(India) Mumbai City	Pre-season	Free transfer	
24 August 2026	(Morocco) Noah Sadaoui	7	WF	(Indonesia) Dewa United	Pre-season	Free transfer	
8 September 2026	(Spain) Matías Hernández	21	DM	(Maldives) New Radiant	Pre-season	Free transfer	
9 September 2026	(India) Sachin Suresh	1	GK	(India) Odisha	Pre-season	Free transfer	
10 September 2026	(India) Nihal Sudeesh	17	RW	(India) Odisha	Pre-season	Free transfer	
14 September 2026	(India) Mohammed Arbaz	21	GK	(India) Malappuram	Pre-season	Free transfer	
13 October 2026	(India) Lalthanmawia Renthlei		FW	(India) Samaleswari	Pre-season	Free transfer	

== Club Personnel ==
=== First-team coaching staff ===
Role	Nationality	Name	Year Appointed	Previous Team	Refs.
Head Coach/Manager	England	Ashley Westwood	2026	Hong Kong (as head coach)	
Assistant Coach	England	Hasney Aljofree	2026	Singapore (as Head of Coach Education & Development)	
Assistant Coach	India	Amit Rana	2026	(India) Kerala Blasters Reserves (as Head Coach)	
Goalkeeping Coach	India	Felix D'Souza	2026	(India) East Bengal (Goalkeeping Coach)	
Strength and Conditioning Coach	England	Alfy Perry	2026	(England) AFC Bournemouth (as Resident Performance Coach)	

=== Management Team ===
Management team
Position	Nationality	Name	Refs.
Chairman	United Arab Emirates	Ahmad bin Faisal Al Qasimi	
Chief Executive Officer	India	Abhik Chatterjee	
Sporting Director		Vacant	
Chief Operating Officer	India	Shushen Vashishth	
Chief Financial Officer	India	Mohit Thadi	
Head of Administrative Operations	India	Thameem Anvar Sadiq	
Marketing Officer	India	Antony Manu	
Revenue Officer	India	Joby Joseph	
Director of Academy		Vacant	

Last updated: 9 October 2026
Source: Kerala Blasters FC

== Competitions ==
=== Overview ===
Competition	First match	Last match	Starting round	Final position	Record							
Competition	First match	Last match	Starting round	Final position	Pld	W	D	L	GF	GA	GD	Win %
Super League	11 October 2026		Matchday 1	TBD	4	1	2	1	3	4	−1	25.00
Federation Cup			Group Stage	TBD	0	0	0	0	0	0	+0	—
Total					4	1	2	1	3	4	−1	25.00

Last updated: 31 October 2026
Source: Soccerway

=== Indian Super League ===
==== League Table ====
Pos	Team	Pld	W	D	L	GF	GA	GD	Pts
7	Goa	4	1	2	1	5	5	0	5
8	Chennaiyin	5	1	2	2	6	7	−1	5
9	Kerala Blasters	4	1	2	1	3	4	−1	5
10	Churchill Brothers	4	1	0	3	4	10	−6	3
11	Mumbai City	4	0	2	2	4	6	−2	2

Updated to match(es) played on 7 November 2026. Source: Indian Super League
Rules for classification: 1) points; 2) goal difference; 3) number of goals scored; 4) head-to-head points; 5) head-to-head goal difference; 6) head-to-head goals scored; 7) fair play ranking; 8) drawing of lots
(Note: Head-to-head record is used only after all the matches between the teams in question have been played).

==== Results summary ====
Overall								Home						Away					
Pld	W	D	L	GF	GA	GD	Pts	W	D	L	GF	GA	GD	W	D	L	GF	GA	GD
4	1	2	1	3	4	−1	5	0	1	0	0	0	0	1	1	1	3	4	−1

Last updated: 31 October 2026.
Source: Indian Super League

==== Results by match ====
Match	1	2	3	4	5	6	7	8	9	10	11	12	13	14	15	16	17	18	19	20	21	22	23	24
Ground	A	A	H	A	A	H	H	H	A	A	A	H	H	H	H	H	A	A	A	H	H	A	A	H
Result	W	L	D	D																				
Position	1	6	5	6																				

Updated to match(es) played on 31 October 2026. Source: indiansuperleague.com
A = Away; H = Home; W = Win; D = Draw; L = Loss
; = Champions/Challenge League Preliminary stage/Knockout; = SAFF Club Championship/Knockout; = Knockout; = Eliminate
Notes: Position indicates Kerala Blasters' position in the league table immediately after each match.

==== Matches ====
Win Draw Loss Fixtures

11 October 2026 1	Inter Kashi	0-2	Kerala Blasters	Pune
17:00 IST (UTC+5:30)		Report	Vibin 18'; Green 90+4'	Stadium: Shree Shiv Chhatrapati Sports Complex; Attendance: 3,459; Man of the Match: Vibin Mohanan

18 October 2026 2	NorthEast United	4-1	Kerala Blasters	Guwahati
19:30 IST	Ajaraie 15', 70'; Moyano 45+4'; Aman 82'	Report	Momo 60'	Stadium: Sarusajai Stadium; Attendance: 9,837; Man of the Match: Alaaeddine Ajaraie

25 October 2026 3	Kerala Blasters	0-0	Mumbai City	Kochi
19:30 IST		Report		Stadium: Jawaharlal Nehru Stadium; Attendance: 40,014; Man of the Match: Amrinder Singh

31 October 2026 4	Chennaiyin	0-0	Kerala Blasters	Chennai
17:00 IST	Emmanuel (yellow card) 88' (red card) 90+3'	Report	Green (red card) 90+3'	Stadium: Marina Arena; Attendance: 9,321; Man of the Match: Nikola Stojanović

29 November 2026 5	Goa	v	Kerala Blasters	Margao
17:00 IST				Stadium: Fatorda Stadium

6 December 2026 6	Kerala Blasters	v	Churchill Brothers	Kochi
19:30 IST				Stadium: Jawaharlal Nehru Stadium; Attendance: TBD; Referee: TBD; Man of the Match: TBD

10 December 2026 7	Kerala Blasters	v	Delhi	Kochi
17:00 IST				Stadium: Jawaharlal Nehru Stadium; Attendance: TBD; Referee: TBD; Man of the Match: TBD

14 December 2026 8	Kerala Blasters	v	Punjab	Kochi
19:30 IST				Stadium: Jawaharlal Nehru Stadium; Attendance: TBD; Referee: TBD; Man of the Match: TBD

20 December 2026 9	Odisha	v	Kerala Blasters	Bhubaneswar
19:30 IST				Stadium: Kalinga Stadium

3 January 2027 10	Bengaluru	v	Kerala Blasters	Bengaluru
19:30 IST				Stadium: Sree Kanteerava Stadium

10 January 2027 11	Mohun Bagan SG	v	Kerala Blasters	Kolkata
17:00 IST				Stadium: Vivekananda Yuba Bharati Krirangan

16 January 2027 12	Kerala Blasters	v	East Bengal	Kochi
19:30 IST				Stadium: Jawaharlal Nehru Stadium; Attendance: TBD; Referee: TBD; Man of the Match: TBD

== Statistics ==
All stats are correct as of 31 October 2026

=== Squad appearances and goals ===
Note: This list includes players registered by the club for the 2026–27 season in any tournament.

No.	Pos	Nat	Player	Total		Super League		Federation Cup	
No.	Pos	Nat	Player	Apps	Goals	Apps	Goals	Apps	Goals
Goalkeepers
1	GK	(India) IND	Amrinder Singh	2	0	2+0	0	0+0	0
31	GK	(India) IND	Arsh Anwer Shaikh	2	0	2+0	0	0+0	0
81	GK	(India) IND	Alsabith ST	0	0	0+0	0	0+0	0
Defenders
3	DF	(India) IND	Sandeep Singh	2	0	0+2	0	0+0	0
4	DF	(India) IND	Hormipam Ruivah	4	0	4+0	0	0+0	0
5	DF	(India) IND	Sumit Sharma	3	0	2+1	0	0+0	0
13	DF	(England) ENG	James Bolton	4	0	4+0	0	0+0	0
19	DF	(India) IND	Jaganath Jayan	0	0	0+0	0	0+0	0
27	DF	(India) IND	Aibanbha Dohling	4	0	4+0	0	0+0	0
33	DF	(India) IND	Bikash Yumnam	0	0	0+0	0	0+0	0
44	DF	(Senegal) SEN	Fallou Ndiaye	1	0	0+1	0	0+0	0
50	DF	(India) IND	Naocha Singh	2	0	2+0	0	0+0	0
55	DF	(India) IND	Amey Ranawade	1	0	1+0	0	0+0	0
Midfielders
6	MF	(India) IND	Freddy Lallawmawma	4	0	4+0	0	0+0	0
8	MF	(India) IND	Vibin Mohanan	4	1	2+2	1	0+0	0
10	MF	(Uruguay) URU	Adrián Luna	3	0	3+0	0	0+0	0
15	MF	(India) IND	Sahil Tavora	0	0	0+0	0	0+0	0
16	MF	(India) IND	Paul Ramfangzauva	1	0	0+1	0	0+0	0
23	MF	(Montenegro) MNE	Nebojša Kosović	4	0	3+1	0	0+0	0
24	MF	(India) IND	Joel Lalramengmawia	0	0	0+0	0	0+0	0
47	MF	(India) IND	Ebindas Yesudasan	2	0	0+2	0	0+0	0
Forwards
7	FW	(India) IND	Korou Singh	4	0	3+1	0	0+0	0
9	FW	(England) ENG	Andre Green	4	1	3+1	1	0+0	0
11	FW	(India) IND	Mohammed Sanan	4	0	2+2	0	0+0	0
32	FW	(India) IND	Mohammad Yasir	0	0	0+0	0	0+0	0
45	FW	(India) IND	Sreekuttan M.S.	3	0	1+2	0	0+0	0
46	FW	(India) IND	Ramhlunchhunga	0	0	0+0	0	0+0	0
99	FW	(Guinea) GUI	Momo Yansané	4	1	2+2	1	0+0	0

=== Goal contributions ===
Note: The following table ranks the players based on their goal contributions during the 2026–27 campaign.

SL No.	Nation	Player	Position(s)	Matches	Goals	Assists	Total
1	(India)	Vibin Mohanan	CM	4	1	0	1
2	(England)	Andre Green	FW	4	1	0	1
3	(Guinea)	Momo Yansané	FW	4	1	0	1
4	(India)	Korou Singh Thingujam	RW	4	0	1	1
5	(India)	Mohammed Sanan	WF	4	0	1	1
6	(Uruguay)	Adrián Luna	AM	3	0	1	1

=== Clean-sheets ===
Rank	Nation	Name	No.	Matches	League	Cup	Total
1	(India)	Amrinder Singh	1	2	2	0	2
2	(India)	Arsh Anwer Shaikh	31	2	1	0	1

=== Disciplinary record ===
No.	Position(s)	Nation	Name	League			Cup			Total		
No.	Position(s)	Nation	Name	Yellow card	Second yellow card	Red card	Yellow card	Second yellow card	Red card	Yellow card	Second yellow card	Red card
9	FW	(England)	Andre Green	0	0	1	0	0	0	0	0	1
5	CB	(India)	Sumit Sharma	1	0	0	0	0	0	1	0	0
27	CB	(India)	Aibanbha Dohling	1	0	0	0	0	0	1	0	0
99	FW	(Guinea)	Momo Yansané	1	0	0	0	0	0	1	0	0

=== Captains ===
Note: The following table mentions all the players who wore the captain's armband for the Blasters throughout the season across all competitions.

Order	No.	Position(s)	Player	League	Cup	Total	Ref.
1	8	CM	(India) Vibin Mohanan	2	0	2	
2	6	CDM	(India) Freddy Lallawmawma	2+2	0	2+2	

=== Injury record ===
No.	Pos.	Nat.	Name	Type	Status	Source	Match	Inj. Date	Ret. Date
33	CB	(India)	Bikash Yumnam	Calf Injury		Pre-Match Press Conference	in pre-season camp	11 October 2026	29 November 2026
10	MF	(Uruguay)	Adrián Luna	Heel blisters		Post-Match Press Conference	in pre-season camp	11 October 2026	18 October 2026
46	CM	(India)	Ramhlunchhunga				in training camp	31 October 2026	29 November 2026

- Player is injured
- Player has recovered from injury
Last updated: 31 October 2026
Source: Kerala Blasters FC

== Awards ==
=== Indian Super League ===
==== Player of the Match ====
Note: The Indian Super League Player of the Match awards are awarded after each matchday to the players by the league based on their performances on that day.

Matchday No.	Player	Opponent	Date	Refs.
Matchday 1	(India) Vibin Mohanan	Inter Kashi	11 October 2026	
Matchday 3	(India) Amrinder Singh	Mumbai City	25 October 2026	

== Milestones ==
All stats are correct as of 31 October 2026

Keys
Final score	The score at full-time; Blasters' listed first.	No.	Squad number	Pos.	Position
(H)	The Blasters were the home team.	(A)	The Blasters were the away team.		

=== Players ===
==== Debuts ====
Note: The following players made their competitive debuts for the Blasters' first team during the campaign.

Win Draw Loss

Date	No.	Pos.	Player	Final score	Opponent	Competition	Refs.
11 October 2026	5	CB	(India) Sumit Sharma	2–0 (A)	Inter Kashi	League	
11 October 2026	13	CB	(England) James Bolton	2–0 (A)	Inter Kashi	League	
11 October 2026	23	CM	(Montenegro) Nebojša Kosović	2–0 (A)	Inter Kashi	League	
11 October 2026	9	FW	(England) Andre Green	2–0 (A)	Inter Kashi	League	
11 October 2026	16	CM	(India) Paul Ramfangzauva	2–0 (A)	Inter Kashi	League	
11 October 2026	99	FW	(Guinea) Momo Yansané	2–0 (A)	Inter Kashi	League	
11 October 2026	11	WF	(India) Mohammed Sanan	2–0 (A)	Inter Kashi	League	
25 October 2026	1	GK	(India) Amrinder Singh	0–0 (H)	Mumbai City	League	

==== First goals ====
Note: The following players scored their first goals for the Blasters' first team during the campaign.

Win Draw Loss

Date	No.	Pos.	Player	Final score	Opponent	Competition	Refs.
11 October 2026	9	FW	(England) Andre Green	2–0 (A)	Inter Kashi	League	
18 October 2026	99	FW	(Guinea) Momo Yansané	1–4 (A)	NorthEast United	League	

== Attendance ==
=== Indian Super League ===
Opponent	Home	Away
Inter Kashi		3,459
NorthEast United		9,837
Mumbai City	40,014	
Chennaiyin		9,321
Goa		
Churchill Brothers		
Delhi		
Punjab		
Odisha		
Bengaluru		
Mohun Bagan SG		
East Bengal		
Average	40,014	7,539

Legend: Highest Lowest

== See also ==
- Kerala Blasters FC
- List of Kerala Blasters FC seasons
- Indian Super League
- 2026–27 Indian Super League season
