= 2025–26 Kerala Blasters FC season =

Kerala Blasters
2025–26 season
- Owner: Magnum Sports Private Limited
- Director Chief Executive Officer: Nikhil Bhardwaj; Abhik Chatterjee
- Head coach: David Català (until 27 March 2026); Ashley Westwood (remainder of season)
- Stadium: Jawaharlal Nehru Stadium, Kochi
- Indian Super League: 8th out of 13
- Indian Super Cup: Group Stage
Home colours	Away colours	Third colours
- All statistics correct as of 6 November 2025, 20:00 (UTC).

The 2025–26 season was the twelfth season in Kerala Blasters FC's existence, as well as their twelfth season in the Indian Super League. It began in April 2025 with the Indian Super Cup and was heavily disrupted by the prolonged uncertainty surrounding the Indian Super League season, which was delayed following the expiry of the commercial agreement between the All India Football Federation (AIFF) and Football Sports Development Limited (FSDL). The resulting crisis affected clubs across the country, leading to financial uncertainty, suspension of team operations, and the departure of several foreign players from Indian football. After a prolonged delay, the 2025–26 Indian Super League began in February 2026.

Following the 2024–25 campaign in which the club failed to qualify for the playoffs, Kerala Blasters appointed Spanish coach David Català as their head coach. Despite a promising start in the Super Cup, where the Blasters won two of their three group-stage matches, they were eliminated after a defeat to Mumbai City FC.

The crisis in Indian football led to the exit of several key players. Club captain Adrián Luna departed on loan to Indonesian side Persik Kediri after spending four seasons, while Moroccan winger Noah Sadaoui also left on loan during the season. Owing to the poor performance of the team, Catala was sacked and was replaced by Ashley Westwood as head coach for the remainder of the season.

== Background ==
Entering the 2025-26 campaign, Kerala Blasters were coming off a disappointing 2024-25 season where they failed to qualify for the ISL playoffs. Furthermore, the club encountered a major administrative setback: they were denied the Premier 1 club licence by the AIFF for the 2025-26 season due to compliance failures. This licence issue raised concerns about stadium safety standards and other governance/infra matters at the home venue.

== Season overview ==
=== Super Cup ===
Kerala Blasters began their 2025–26 AIFF Super Cup campaign strongly under new head coach David Català. Drawn into Group D alongside Rajasthan United, Sporting Club Delhi and Mumbai City, the Blasters registered back-to-back wins.

The Blasters opened their tournament with a narrow 1–0 victory over Rajasthan United. New Spanish forward Koldo Obieta marked his debut goal for the club, scoring the only goal late in the match to secure all three points. The result also gave Català a winning start in his first official competitive fixture in charge.

Kerala Blasters followed up with a 3–0 win over Sporting Club Delhi. Obieta continued his fine form with a brace, while Korou Singh Thingujam added the third. All three goals came in the first half, signalling a strong performance. But Kerala Blasters' final group-stage match ended in disappointment as they suffered a narrow 1–0 defeat to Mumbai City FC, which knocked them out of the tournament.

== Club Personnel ==
As of 7 October 2025

=== First-team coaching staff ===
Role	Nationality	Name	Year Appointed	Previous club	Refs.
Head Coach/Manager	England	Ashley Westwood	2026	Hong Kong (as head coach)	
Assistant Coach	India	Chinta Chandrashekar Rao	2026	(India) Sporting Bengaluru (as head coach)	
Assistant Coach	England	Peter Hartley	2026	(Scotland) St. Mirren FC B (as assistant coach)	

=== First-team squad ===
Notes:

- Table below mentions the squad registered by the club for the 2025–26 season.
- Flags indicate national team as defined under FIFA eligibility rules. Players may hold more than one non-FIFA nationality.
- ^{*} Players who joined the club permanently or on loan during the season.
- ^{†} Players who were not registered by the club for the 2025–26 season.

No.	Name	Nat.	Pos.	Footedness	Date of Birth (Age)	Height	Last Club	Transfer Fee	Signed	Contract Till
Goalkeepers
1	Sachin Suresh	(India)	GK	Right	18 January 2001 (age 25)	1.83 m	Youth System	N/A	2021	2026
31	Arsh Anwer Shaikh	(India)	GK	Right	9 July 2002 (age 24)	1.88 m	(India) Mohun Bagan	Free transfer	2025	2028
81	Alsabith ST	(India)	GK	Right	1 July 2007 (age 19)	1.80 m	Youth System	N/A	N/A	2027
Defenders
3	Sandeep Singh	(India)	RB/CB/LB	Right	1 March 1995 (age 31)	1.79 m	(India) TRAU FC	Free transfer	2020	2027
4	Hormipam Ruivah	(India)	CB	Right	25 January 2001 (age 25)	1.83 m	(India) RoundGlass Punjab FC	Free transfer	2021	2027
5	Muhammed Saheef	(India)	LB	Left	7 February 2003 (age 23)	1.84 m	(India) Gokulam Kerala FC	Loan Return	2022	2026
15	Jagannath Jayan	(India)	CB	Right	27 June 2005 (age 21)		Youth System	NA	2026	2027
27	Aibanbha Dohling	(India)	LB/CB	Right	23 March 1996 (age 30)	1.76 m	(India) FC Goa	₹1.45 crore (US$174,000)	2023	2026
30	Sumit Sharma	(India)	CB	Right	5 March 2007 (age 19)	1.83 m	(India) Classic FA	Free transfer	2025	2028
44	Fallou Ndiaye	(Senegal)	CB	Right	10 November 2001 (age 25)	1.98 m	(Finland) SJK	Free transfer	2026	2027
50	Naocha Singh	(India)	LB	Left	24 August 1999 (age 27)	1.68 m	(India) Mumbai City FC	Free transfer	2023	2025
63	Bikash Yumnam	(India)	CB	Right	6 September 2003 (age 23)	1.83 m	(India) Chennaiyin	Free transfer	2025	2029
Midfielders
6	Freddy Lallawmawma	(India)	CDM	Right	27 July 2002 (age 24)	1.71 m	(India) Punjab FC	Undisclosed fee	2023	2027
8	Vibin Mohanan	(India)	CM	Right	6 February 2003 (age 23)	1.73 m	Youth System	N/A	2022	2029
10	Marlon Roos-Trujillo	(Germany)	AM	Right	16 August 2003 (age 23)	1.80 m		Free transfer	2026	2026
13	Danish Farooq Bhat	(India)	LM	Right	9 May 1996 (age 30)	1.85 m	(India) Bengaluru FC	₹25 lakhs (US$30,000)	2023	2026
21	Matías Hernández	(Spain)	DM	Right	23 June 1996 (age 30)	1.86 m	(India) Gokulam Kerala	Free transfer	2026	2026
22	Rowllin Borges	(India)	DM	Right	5 June 1992 (age 34)	1.82 m		Free transfer	2026	2026
23	Franchu	(Argentina)	AM	Right	12 May 1998 (age 28)	1.72 m	(Cyprus) Karmiotissa	Free transfer	2026	2026
25	Karim Benarif	(Morocco)	CM	Right	20 January 1993 (age 33)	1.76 m	(Iraq) Karbala	Free transfer	2026	2026
39	Kévin Yoke	(France)	LM	Both	23 June 1996 (age 30)	1.82 m	(Greece) Chania	Free transfer	2026	2026
47	Ebindas Yesudasan	(India)	AM	Right	19 April 2005 (age 21)		Youth System	NA	2026	2027
94	R. Lalthanmawia	(India)	LW/RW	Both	9 May 2002 (age 24)	1.71 m	(India) Aizawl FC	Free transfer	2024	2027
Forwards
7	Víctor Bertomeu	(Spain)	CF	Right	19 October 1992 (age 34)	1.85 m		Free transfer	2026	2026
9	Jai Quitongo	(Scotland)	ST	Right	14 September 1997 (age 29)	1.80 m		Free transfer	2026	2026
11	Korou Singh	(India)	LM/LW	Right	3 December 2006 (age 19)	1.67 m	Youth System	N/A	2024	TBC
17	Nihal Sudeesh	(India)	RW	Right	18 June 2001 (age 25)	1.72 m	Youth System	N/A	2022	2026
14	Salahudheen Adnan	(India)	CF	Right	26 May 2001 (age 25)		Mohun Bagan B	NA	2026	2027
19	Muhammad Ajsal	(India)	CF	Right	28 March 2003 (age 23)		Youth System	NA	2026	2027
45	Sreekuttan MS	(India)	CF	Right	30 November 2004 (age 21)	1.81 m	Youth System	N/A	2023	2027

=== Contract Extensions ===
Date	Player	No.	Position(s)	Contract Till	Refs.
21 July 2025	(India) Sreekuttan MS	45	CF	2027	

== Transfers ==
=== Transfers In ===
Date	Player	No.	Position(s)	Last Club	Contract Length	Transfer window	Fee	Refs.
1 June 2025	(India) Amey Ranawade	55	RB	(India) Mumbai City	5 years	Pre-season	Free transfer	
14 June 2025	(India) Arsh Anwer Shaikh	31	GK	(India) Mohun Bagan	3 years	Pre-season	Free transfer	
7 July 2025	(India) Sumit Sharma	30	CB	(India) Classic FA	3 years	Pre-season	Free transfer	
3 October 2025	(Spain) Koldo Obieta	9	CF	(Spain) Real Unión	1 year	Pre-season	Free transfer	
8 October 2025	(Portugal) Tiago Alves	77	CF	Free Agent	1 year	Pre-season	Free transfer	
9 October 2025	(Spain) Juan Rodríguez	22	CB	(Spain) Lugo	1 year	Pre-season	Free transfer	
25 January 2026	(India) Rowllin Borges	22	DM	Free Agent	1 year	Mid-season	Free transfer	
25 January 2026	(Germany) Marlon Roos-Trujillo	10	AM	Free Agent	1 year	Mid-season	Free transfer	
26 January 2026	(France) Kévin Yoke	39	LW	(Greece) Chania	1 year	Mid-season	Free transfer	
27 January 2026	(Spain) Matías Hernández	21	DM	(India) Gokulam Kerala	1 year	Mid-season	Free transfer	
29 January 2026	(Spain) Víctor Bertomeu	7	CF	Free Agent	1 year	Mid-season	Free transfer	
30 January 2026	(Guinea) Oumar Bah	2	CB	Free Agent	1 year	Mid-season	Free transfer	
02 February 2026	(India) Salahudheen Adnan		CF	(India) Mohun Bagan B	1 year	Mid-season	Free transfer	
21 February 2026	(Scotland) Jai Quitongo	9	ST	(Malta) Marsaxlokk	1 year	Mid-season	Free transfer	
04 March 2026	(Senegal) Fallou Ndiaye		CB	(Finland) SJK	1 year	Mid-season	Free transfer	
30 March 2026	(Morocco) Karim Benarif		CM	(Iraq) Karbala	1 year	Mid-season	Free transfer	
10 April 2026	(Argentina) Francisco Feuillassier		WF	Free Agent	1 year	Mid-season	Free transfer	

=== Promoted from Reserves ===
No.	Name	Nationality	Position(s)	Date of Birth (Age)	Refs.
44	Muhammad Ajsal	(India)	LW	28 March 2003 (age 23)	
	Jagannath Jayan	(India)	DF	27 June 2005 (age 21)	
	Ebindas Yesudasan	(India)	AM	3 December 2006 (age 19)	
	Alsabith ST	(India)	GK	1 July 2007 (age 19)	

=== Transfers Out ===
Exit Date	Player	No.	Position(s)	To	Transfer window	Fee	Refs.
17 June 2025	(Montenegro) Miloš Drinčić	15	CB/LB	(Thailand) BG Pathum United	Pre-season	Free transfer	
3 July 2025	(Ghana) Kwame Peprah	14	ST	(Cambodia) PKR Svay Rieng	Pre-season	Free transfer	
4 July 2025	(India) Saurav Mandal	17	RM/RW	TBA	Pre-season	Free transfer	
11 July 2025	(Spain) Jesús Jiménez	9	CF	(Poland) Bruk-Bet Termalica Nieciecza	Pre-season	Free transfer	
1 July 2025	(India) Ishan Pandita	26	CF	(India) TBA	Pre-season	Free transfer	
22 August 2025	(India) Bryce Miranda	18	LM/LW	(India) Diamond Harbour	Pre-season	Free transfer	
22 October 2025	(India) Sagolsem Bikash Singh	23	LW	(India) Punjab	Pre-season	Free transfer	
22 October 2025	(India) Prabir Das	33	RB	(India) Inter Kashi	Pre-season	Free transfer	
30 December 2025	(Portugal) Tiago Alves	77	CF	(Cambodia) PKR Svay Rieng	Mid-season	Free transfer	
14 January 2026	(Spain) Juan Rodríguez	22	CB	(Spain) Marbella	Mid-season	Free transfer	
24 January 2026	(Spain) Koldo Obieta	9	CF	(Indonesia) Borneo Samarinda	Mid-season	Free transfer	
24 January 2026	(Montenegro) Dušan Lagator	94	DM	(Indonesia) PSM Makassar	Mid-season	Free transfer	
24 January 2026	(India) Mohammed Aimen	19	LW	(India) SC Delhi	Mid-season	Free transfer	
24 January 2026	(India) Mohammed Azhar	19	MF	(India) SC Delhi	Mid-season	Free transfer	
08 February 2026	(India) Nora Fernandes	20	GK	(India) SC Delhi	Mid-season	Free transfer	
04 March 2026	(Guinea) Oumar Bah	2	CB	TBD	Mid-season	Free transfer	
14 March 2026	(India) Yoihenba Meitei		CM	(India) Morning Star FC	Mid-season	Free transfer	

=== Loan Returns ===
Player	No.	Position(s)	From
(India) Nihal Sudeesh	77	RW	(India) Punjab FC
(India) Likmabam Rakesh	—	LB	(India) Punjab FC
(India) Sagolsem Bikash Singh	23	LW	(India) Mohammedan SC
(India) Thomas Cherian	—	CB	(India) Churchill Brothers FC Goa
(India) Muhammad Ajsal	44	LW	(India) Gokulam Kerala FC
(India) Mohammed Arbaz	21	GK	(India) Real Kashmir FC

=== Loan Outs ===
Exit Date	Player	No.	Position(s)	To	Transfer window	Refs.
16 July 2025	(India) Likmabam Rakesh	—	LB	(India) Punjab FC	Pre-season	
19 August 2025	(India) Mohammed Arbaz	21	GK	(India) Diamond Harbour	Pre-season	
3 January 2026	(Morocco) Noah Sadaoui	7	WF	(Indonesia) Dewa United	Mid-season	
08 January 2026	(Uruguay) Adrián Luna	10	MF	(Indonesia) Persik Kediri	Mid-season	
08 February 2026	(India) Amey Ranawade	55	DF	(India) Mohun Bagan	Mid-season	

== Pre-season and friendlies ==
Win Draw Loss Fixtures

18 October 2025 Friendly	(India) Chennaiyin FC	0–1	Kerala Blasters	Goa, India
TBC IST		Report	Danish (TBC)	Attendance: TBC; Referee: TBC; Man of the Match: N/A

4 February 2026 Friendly	(India) Kerala Blasters	1-0	Gokulam Kerala	The Sanctuary, Thripunithura, Kerala
TBC IST	Amawia (TBC)	Report		Attendance: TBC; Referee: TBC; Man of the Match: N/A

9 February 2026 Friendly	(India) Kerala Blasters	3-1	Gokulam Kerala	The Sanctuary, Thripunithura, Kerala
TBC IST	Victor Bertomeu (TBC); Rowllin Borges (TBC); Ebindas Yesudas (TBC)	Report	TBC (TBC)	Attendance: TBC; Referee: TBC; Man of the Match: N/A

== Competitions ==
=== Overview ===
Competition	First match	Last match	Starting round	Final position	Record							
Competition	First match	Last match	Starting round	Final position	Pld	W	D	L	GF	GA	GD	Win %
Super Cup	30 October 2025	6 November 2025	Group Stage	Group Stage	3	2	0	1	4	1	+3	66.67
Super League	14 February 2026	18 May 2026	Matchday 1	8th	13	5	2	6	15	17	−2	38.46
Total					16	7	2	7	19	18	+1	43.75

Source: Soccerway

=== Indian Super League ===
==== League table ====
Pos	Team	Pld	W	D	L	GF	GA	GD	Pts	Qualification
6	Punjab	13	6	4	3	18	12	+6	22 (Note: Head-to-head points: Jamshedpur 3, Punjab 0.)	
7	Goa	13	5	5	3	15	11	+4	20	Qualification for the Champions League Two qualifying playoffs (Note: Goa qualified for the AFC Champions League Two qualifying playoffs as the 2025–26 AIFF Super Cup winners.)
8	Kerala Blasters	13	5	2	6	15	17	−2	17	
9	NorthEast United	13	4	4	5	16	21	−5	16	
10	Inter Kashi	13	3	4	6	11	17	−6	13	

Source: Indian Super League
Rules for classification: 1) points; 2) goal difference; 3) number of goals scored; 4) head-to-head points; 5) head-to-head goal difference; 6) head-to-head goals scored; 7) fair play ranking; 8) drawing of lots.
(Note: Head-to-head record is used only after all the matches between the teams in question have been played).

==== Results by match ====
Match	1	2	3	4	5	6	7	8	9	10	11	12	13
Ground	A	H	H	H	A	H	A	A	H	H	H	H	H
Result	L	L	L	L	D	L	L	W	D	W	W	W	W
Position	13	12	12	12	12	13	13	13	11	9	9	8	8

Updated to match(es) played on 18 May 2026. Source: indiansuperleague.com
A = Away; H = Home; W = Win; D = Draw; L = Loss

==== Matches ====
14 February 2026 1	Mohun Bagan	2–0	Kerala Blasters	Kolkata
17:00 IST	Maclaren 36'; Alberto (yellow card) 51'; Aldred 90+5'	Report	Farooq (yellow card) 30'; Naocha (yellow card) 48'; Bikash (yellow card) 82'	Stadium: Vivekananda Yuba Bharati Krirangan; Attendance: 29,110; Referee: Aditya Purkayastha; Man of the Match: Jamie Maclaren (Mohun Bagan)

22 February 2026 2	Kerala Blasters	0-1	Mumbai City FC	Kochi
19:30 IST		Report	Lallianzuala Chhangte 48'	Stadium: Jawaharlal Nehru Stadium; Attendance: 16,243; Referee: TBD; Man of the Match: TBD

28 February 2026 3	Kerala Blasters	1-2	Inter Kashi	Kochi
17:00 IST	Víctor 84'	Report	Petkevičius 34'; Alfred 78'	Stadium: Jawaharlal Nehru Stadium; Attendance: 7,856; Referee: TBD; Man of the Match: Alfred Planas (Inter Kashi)

7 March 2026 4	Kerala Blasters	0-1	Chennaiyin FC	Kochi
17:00 IST		Report		Stadium: Jawaharlal Nehru Stadium; Attendance: TBD; Referee: TBD; Man of the Match: TBD

14 March 2026 5	East Bengal	1–1	Kerala Blasters	Kolkata
17:00 IST	Ezzejjari 10' (pen.)	Report	Dohling (yellow card) 10'; Ndiaye (yellow card) 86'; Ajsal 90+6'	Stadium: Salt Lake Stadium; Attendance: 13,379; Referee: Harish Kundu; Man of the Match: Muhammad Ajsal (Kerala Blasters)

21 March 2026 6	Kerala Blasters	1-3	Punjab	Kochi
19:30 IST	Ndiaye 65'			Stadium: Jawaharlal Nehru Stadium; Attendance: TBD; Referee: TBD; Man of the Match: TBD

5 April 2026 7	SC Delhi	2-0	Kerala Blasters	Delhi
17:00 IST				Stadium: Jawaharlal Nehru Stadium; Attendance: TBD; Referee: TBD; Man of the Match: TBD

11 April 2026 8	Bengaluru	1-2	Kerala Blasters	Bengaluru
17:00 IST			Víctor 61'; Franchu 78'	Stadium: Sree Kanteerava Stadium; Attendance: TBD; Referee: TBD; Man of the Match: TBD

15 April 2026 9	Kerala Blasters	1-1	NorthEast United	Kochi
19:30 IST				Stadium: Jawaharlal Nehru Stadium; Attendance: TBD; Referee: TBD; Man of the Match: TBD

18 April 2026 10	Kerala Blasters	2-0	Jamshedpur	Kochi
17:00 IST	Nihal 12'; Vibin 36'			Stadium: Jawaharlal Nehru Stadium; Attendance: TBD; Referee: TBD; Man of the Match: TBD

23 April 2026 11	Kerala Blasters	2-1	Odisha	Kochi
19:30 IST	Víctor 12'; Matías 90+4'			Stadium: Jawaharlal Nehru Stadium; Attendance: TBD; Referee: TBD; Man of the Match: TBD

10 May 2026 12	Kerala Blasters	3-1	Mohammedan	Kochi
17:00 IST	Franchu 44'; Víctor 59'; Sreekuttan MS 74'		M.Roy 42'	Stadium: Jawaharlal Nehru Stadium; Attendance: TBD; Referee: TBD; Man of the Match: TBD

17 May 2026 13	Kerala Blasters	2-1	Goa	Kochi
19:00 IST				Stadium: Jawaharlal Nehru Stadium; Attendance: TBD; Referee: TBD; Man of the Match: TBD

=== Super Cup ===
==== Group D ====
Pos	Team	Pld	W	D	L	GF	GA	GD	Pts	Qualification	MUM	KER	RAJ	DEL
1	Mumbai City	3	2	0	1	5	2	+3	6 (Note: Head-to-head points: Mumbai City 3, Kerala 0.)	Advance to knockout stage		1–0	0–1	4–1
2	Kerala Blasters	3	2	0	1	4	1	+3	6				1–0	3–0
3	Rajasthan United	3	1	1	1	3	3	0	4					2–2
4	Delhi	3	0	1	2	3	9	−6	1					

Source: AIFF
Legend: Blue = home team win; Yellow = draw; Red = away team win.
Rules for classification: 1) points; 2) head-to-head points; 3) head-to-head goal difference; 4) goal difference; 5) number of goals scored; 6) Penalty shoot-out if only two teams are tied and they met in the last round of the group; 7) Disciplinary points; 8) drawing of lots

==== Matches ====
30 October 2025 1	Rajasthan United	0-1	Kerala Blasters	Bambolim
16:30 IST		I-League; PDF Report	Obieta 87'	Stadium: GMC Athletic Stadium; Attendance: 213; Referee: Aditya Purkayastha

3 November 2025 2	Kerala Blasters	3–0	Sporting Delhi	Bambolim
16:30 IST	Obieta 18', 23'; Thingujam 34'	I-League; PDF Report		Stadium: GMC Athletic Stadium; Attendance: 100; Referee: Ashwin

6 November 2025 3	Mumbai City	1–0	Kerala Blasters	Fatorda
19:30 IST	Saheef 88' (o.g.)	I-League; PDF Report		Stadium: Fatorda Stadium; Attendance: 488; Referee: Harish Kundu; Man of the Match: Akash Mishra (Mumbai City)

== Statistics ==
All stats are correct as of 10 May 2026

=== Goalscorers ===
Rank	Nation	Name	No.	Position(s)	League	Super Cup	Total
1	(Spain)	Víctor Bertomeu	7	CF	4	0	4
2	(Spain)	Koldo Obieta	~~9~~	CF	0	3	3
3	(Argentina)	Franchu	23	AM	2	0	2
3	(Senegal)	Fallou Ndiaye	44	CB	2	0	2
5	(India)	Vibin Mohanan	8	MF	1	0	1
5	(India)	Korou Singh	11	WF	0	1	1
5	(India)	Nihal Sudeesh	17	WF	1	0	1
5	(India)	Muhammad Ajsal	19	WF	1	0	1
5	(Spain)	Matías Hernández	21	DM	1	0	1
5	(France)	Kévin Yoke	39	WF	1	0	1
5	(India)	Sreekuttan MS	45	AM	1	0	1
Own Goals					1	0	1
Total					15	4	19

Source: Indian Super League

=== Assists ===
Rank	Nation	Name	No.	Position(s)	League	Super Cup	Total
1	(India)	Ebindas Yesudasan	47	CM	4	0	4
2	(Argentina)	Franchu	23	AM	3	0	3
3	(France)	Kévin Yoke	39	WF	2	0	2
4	(India)	Vibin Mohanan	8	MF	1	0	1
4	(Scotland)	Jai Quitongo	~~9~~	CM	1	0	1
4	(Uruguay)	Adrián Luna	~~10~~	CM	0	1	1
4	(India)	Nihal Sudeesh	17	WF	0	1	1
4	(Spain)	Juan Rodríguez	~~22~~	CB	0	1	1
4	(Morocco)	Karim Benarif	23	CM	1	0	1
Total					12	3	15

=== Clean-sheets ===
Rank	Nation	Name	No.	League	Super Cup	Total
1	(India)	Nora Fernandes	22	0	2	2
Total				0	2	2

=== Appearances ===
Players with no appearances are not included on the list.

As of 28 February 2026

No.	Pos.	Nat.	Name	Super League		Indian Super Cup		Total	
No.	Pos.	Nat.	Name	Apps	Starts	Apps	Starts	Apps	Starts
1	GK	(India)	Sachin Suresh	1	1	0	0	1	1
2	DF	(Guinea)	Oumar Bah	3	3	0	0	3	3
3	DF	(India)	Sandeep Singh	2	2	3	3	5	5
5	DF	(India)	Muhammed Saheef	2	2	3	3	5	5
6	MF	(India)	Freddy Lallawmawma	0	0	2	0	2	0
~~7~~	WF	(Morocco)	Noah Sadaoui	0	0	3	2	3	2
7	FW	(Spain)	Víctor Bertomeu	3	3	0	0	3	3
8	MF	(India)	Vibin Mohanan	3	1	2	1	5	2
~~9~~	FW	(Spain)	Koldo Obieta	0	0	3	3	3	3
9	FW	(Scotland)	Jai Quitongo	1	0	0	0	1	0
~~10~~	MF	(Uruguay)	Adrián Luna	0	0	3	3	3	3
10	MF	(Germany)	Marlon Roos-Trujillo	3	1	0	0	3	1
11	WF	(India)	Korou Singh	3	3	3	3	6	6
13	MF	(India)	Danish Farooq	3	3	3	1	6	4
17	WF	(India)	Nihal Sudeesh	2	2	3	2	5	4
~~19~~	WF	(India)	Mohammed Aimen	0	0	2	0	2	0
19	WF	(India)	Muhammad Ajsal	2	0	0	0	2	0
~~20~~	GK	(India)	Nora Fernandes	0	0	3	3	3	3
21	MF	(Spain)	Matías Hernández	2	1	0	0	2	1
~~22~~	DF	(Spain)	Juan Rodríguez	0	0	3	3	3	3
22	MF	(India)	Rowllin Borges	2	2	0	0	2	2
27	DF	(India)	Aibanbha Dohling	1	1	2	0	3	1
31	GK	(India)	Arsh Anwer Shaikh	2	2	0	0	2	2
39	MF	(France)	Kévin Yoke	3	1	0	0	3	1
45	FW	(India)	Sreekuttan MS	1	0	0	0	1	0
47	MF	(India)	Ebindas Yesudasan	3	1	0	0	3	1
50	DF	(India)	Naocha Singh	3	2	1	0	4	2
~~55~~	DF	(India)	Amey Ranawade	0	0	1	0	1	0
63	DF	(India)	Bikash Yumnam	3	2	3	3	6	5
~~77~~	CF	(Portugal)	Tiago Alves	0	0	2	1	2	1
~~94~~	MF	(Montenegro)	Dušan Lagator	0	0	2	2	2	2
97	MF	(India)	Lalthanmawia Renthlei	0	0	1	0	1	0

=== Disciplinary record ===
No.	Position(s)	Nation	Name	League			Super Cup			Total		
No.	Position(s)	Nation	Name	Yellow card	Second yellow card	Red card	Yellow card	Second yellow card	Red card	Yellow card	Second yellow card	Red card
2	CB	(Guinea)	Oumar Bah	1	0	0	0	0	0	1	0	0
3	RB	(India)	Sandeep Singh	0	0	0	2	1	0	2	1	0
5	LB	(India)	Muhammed Saheef	1	0	0	1	0	0	2	0	0
~~10~~	CM	(Uruguay)	Adrián Luna	0	0	0	1	0	0	1	0	0
10	AM	(Germany)	Marlon Roos-Trujillo	1	0	0	0	0	0	1	0	0
11	WF	(India)	Korou Singh	0	0	0	1	0	0	1	0	0
13	CM	(India)	Danish Farooq	1	0	0	0	0	0	1	0	0
50	LB	(India)	Naocha Singh	2	0	0	0	0	0	2	0	0
63	CB	(India)	Bikash Yumnam	1	0	0	0	0	0	1	0	0
97	CM	(India)	Lalthanmawia Renthlei	0	0	0	1	0	0	1	0	0
Total				7	0	0	6	1	0	13	1	0
