= 2025–26 Indian Super League =

12th season of the Indian Football League

Indian Super League
- Season: 2025–26
- Dates: 14 February – 21 May 2026
- Teams: 14
- Champions: East Bengal; 1st ISL title 4th Indian title
- Relegated: Mohammedan
- AFC Champions League 2: East Bengal; Goa (as AIFF Super Cup winners)
- Matches: 91
- Goals: 221 (2.43 per match)
- Best player: Miguel Figueira
- Top goalscorer: Youssef Ezzejjari (11 goals)
- Best goalkeeper: Hrithik Tiwari (5 clean sheets)
- Biggest home win: East Bengal 7–0 Mohammedan (23 March 2026)
- Biggest away win: Mohammedan 0–4 Mumbai City (15 May 2026)
- Highest scoring: East Bengal 7–0 Mohammedan (23 March 2026)
- Longest winning run: 4 matches Jamshedpur; Mohun Bagan; Kerala Blasters
- Longest unbeaten run: 10 matches East Bengal
- Longest winless run: 13 matches Mohammedan
- Longest losing run: 7 matches Mohammedan
- Highest attendance: 62,201; Mohun Bagan 1–1 East Bengal (17 May 2026)
- Lowest attendance: 156; Odisha 2–3 Punjab FC (16 May 2026)
- Total attendance: 768,450
- Average attendance: 8,634

The 2025–26 Indian Super League was the 12th season of the Indian Super League (ISL) and the 30th season of top-tier Indian football. The season commenced on 14 February and concluded on 21 May 2026.

Mohun Bagan are the defending champions, having won their second Indian Super League title.

East Bengal won their first ISL title and fourth overall Indian title, ending a 22-year league drought.

== Background ==
=== Developments ===
- In June 2025, the FSDL formally informed the ISL clubs and the AIFF that the 2025–26 season was on hold due to unresolved contractual issues, ahead of the expiry of the Master Rights Agreement in December. After the intervention of the Supreme Court of India, which requested both parties to resolve the issues between them and start the 2025–26 season as quickly as they could, both parties promised that the new season would start in December.
- The season was delayed even further after no bids came in for a tender for commercial partners floated by the AIFF on 16 October 2025.
- On 6 January 2026, after discussions with the stake holders, sports minister Mansukh Mandaviya confirmed that ISL would begin on 14 February, and would be played in a single leg home-and-away format for a total of 91 matches.
- On 12 January 2026, all 14 clubs confirmed their participation in this season. The AIFF outlined a total proposed budget of ₹24.26 crore for the season, a significant reduction from the previous seasons. The federation will contribute ₹9.77 crore upfront, while each participating club will provide ₹1 crore. The remaining expenses will be managed through allocated federation resources as the league progresses.
- The Asian Football Confederation granted India a one-season exemption from the mandatory 24-match league requirement. Hence, both the ISL champions and Super Cup winners will be eligible to participate in the 2026–27 AFC Champions League Two qualifiers next season.
- Following a media rights tender by the AIFF in January 2026, OTT sports streaming platform FanCode were announced as winners of the broadcasting rights and will be the official streaming partner of the 2025–26 season, while KPS Studios won the bid for production rights. The Indian Super League (ISL) 2025–26 season will be broadcast on the Sony Sports Network after FanCode sublicensed the linear TV rights to the media conglomerate.

=== Changes from last season ===
- This is the first season without the post-season ISL Cup playoffs. The 14 participating clubs will compete in a single-leg round-robin format, with each team playing 13 matches. The table toppers at the end of the league will be crowned champions.
- The AIFF will implement relegation this season onwards, despite objections from all 14 clubs, who cited the shortened season as their primary concern.

== Teams ==
14 teams from 12 cities are competing in the 12th season of Indian Super League – thirteen from the previous season and one promoted from the I-League. Churchill Brothers were initially declared the provisional champions of the I-League by AIFF, but the decision was later overturned by the Court of Arbitration for Sport who declared Inter Kashi as champions.

On 7 October 2025, Hyderabad FC announced its relocation to Delhi and rebranded to SC Delhi.

Promoted from I-League

- Inter Kashi ▲

Rebranded clubs

- Hyderabad FC shifted its base to Delhi and rebranded as Sporting Club Delhi.

=== Stadiums and locations ===
Locations of Indian Super League teams
Location of the Kolkata football club tents and stadiums

Team	Location	Stadium	Capacity
Bengaluru	Bengaluru	Sree Kanteerava Stadium	25,810
Chennaiyin	Chennai	Marina Arena	40,000
Delhi	New Delhi	Jawaharlal Nehru Stadium	60,254
East Bengal	Kolkata	Vivekananda Yuba Bharati Krirangan	85,000
Goa	Margao	Fatorda Stadium	19,000
Inter Kashi (Note: The club is based in Varanasi, Uttar Pradesh, but will play its home games in Kishore Bharati Krirangan at Kolkata due to ongoing construction on their own stadium getting built in Varanasi, Uttar Pradesh.)	Varanasi	Kishore Bharati Krirangan, Kolkata	12,000
Jamshedpur	Jamshedpur	JRD Tata Sports Complex	24,424
Kerala Blasters	Kochi	Jawaharlal Nehru Stadium	40,000
Mohammedan	Kolkata	Kishore Bharati Krirangan	12,000
Mohun Bagan	Kolkata	Vivekananda Yuba Bharati Krirangan	85,000
Mumbai City	Mumbai	Mumbai Football Arena	7,000
NorthEast United	Guwahati	IG Athletic Stadium	21,600
Odisha	Bhubaneswar	Kalinga Stadium	15,000
Punjab (Note: The club is based in Mohali, Punjab, but played its home games in New Delhi.)	Mohali	Jawaharlal Nehru Stadium, New Delhi	60,254

== Personnel and kits ==
Team	Head coach	Captain(s)	Kit manufacturer	Shirt sponsor
Bengaluru	(Spain) Pep Muñoz	(India) Sunil Chhetri	Puma	JSW
Chennaiyin	(India) Clifford Miranda	(Spain) Alberto Noguera	Six5Six	ISGL.in
Delhi	(Poland) Tomasz Tchórz	(India) Lamgoulen Hangshing	Six5Six	Universal Sompo General Insurance
East Bengal	(Spain) Óscar Bruzón	(Spain) Saúl Crespo	Trak Only	Emami
Goa	(Spain) Manolo Márquez	(India) Sandesh Jhingan	Six5Six	ISGL.in
Inter Kashi	(India) Abhijit Mondal	(Spain) Sergio Llamas	Hummel	RDB Group
Jamshedpur	(Republic of Ireland) Owen Coyle	(Nigeria) Stephen Eze	Nivia	Tata Steel
Kerala Blasters	(England) Ashley Westwood	(India) Danish Farooq (India) Bikash Yumnam (India) Aibanbha Dohling	Six5Six	White Gold
Mohammedan	(India) Mehrajuddin Wadoo	(India) Gaurav Bora	Rocky Sports	Merlin Group
Mohun Bagan	(Spain) Sergio Lobera	(India) Subhasish Bose	Skechers	CESC
Mumbai City	(Czech Republic) Petr Kratky	(India) Lallianzuala Chhangte	Puma	Etihad Airways
NorthEast United	(Spain) Juan Pedro Benali	(Spain) Michel Zabaco	Reebok	Meghalaya Tourism
Odisha	(India) TG Purushothaman	(Spain) Carlos Delgado	Kaidos Sports	Odisha Tourism
Punjab	(Greece) Panagiotis Dilberis	(India) Nikhil Prabhu	Shiv Naresh	DafaNews

== Managerial changes ==
Team	Outgoing manager	Manner of departure	Date of vacancy	Position	Incoming manager	Date of appointment
Kerala Blasters	(India) T. G. Purushothaman	End of interim spell	25 March 2025	Pre-season	(Spain) David Català	25 March 2025
Delhi	(India) Shameel Chembakath	End of interim spell	31 May 2025	Pre-season	(Poland) Tomasz Tchórz	19 October 2025
Chennaiyin	(Republic of Ireland) Owen Coyle	Mutual consent	17 July 2025	Pre-season	(India) Clifford Miranda	12 September 2025
Jamshedpur	(India) Khalid Jamil	Signed by India	13 August 2025	Pre-season	(Republic of Ireland) Owen Coyle	24 January 2026
Odisha	(Spain) Sergio Lobera	Mutual consent	26 November 2025	Pre-season	(India) TG Purushothaman	5 February 2026
Mohun Bagan	(Spain) José Francisco Molina	Sacked	26 November 2025	Pre-season	(Spain) Sergio Lobera	26 November 2025
Bengaluru	(Spain) Gerard Zaragoza	Mutual consent	14 November 2025	Pre-season	(India) Renedy Singh	14 November 2025
Bengaluru	(India) Renedy Singh	Mutual consent	25 March 2026	5th	(Spain) Pep Muñoz	25 March 2026
Kerala Blasters	(Spain) David Català	Sacked	27 March 2026	13th	(England) Ashley Westwood	27 March 2026
Inter Kashi	(Spain) Antonio López Habas	Mutual consent	11 May 2026	10th	(India) Abhijit Mondal	11 May 2026

== Foreign players ==
The AIFF allows teams to register a maximum of six foreign players. A maximum of four can be fielded in a match at a time.

Due to the uncertainty surrounding Indian football, a number of foreign players exited their clubs before the start of the shortened season.

Team	Player 1	Player 2	Player 3	Player 4	Player 5	Player 6	Unregistered player(s)	Former player(s)
Bengaluru	(Argentina) Braian Sánchez	(Uzbekistan) Sirozhiddin Kuziev						
Chennaiyin	(Brazil) Eduardo Kau	(Brazil) Elsinho	(Morocco) Mohammed Ali Bemammer	(Nigeria) Daniel Chima Chukwu	(Spain) Alberto Noguera	(Spain) Iñigo Martin		
Delhi	(Paraguay) Julio Rivas	(Brazil) Rafael Ribeiro	(France) Ousmane Fané	(Ghana) Abdul Halik Hudu	(Ghana) Ebenezer Amoh	(Serbia) Matija Babović		
East Bengal	(Argentina) Kevin Sibille	(Brazil) Miguel Figueira	(Denmark) Anton Søjberg	(Palestine) Mohammed Rashid	(Spain) Saúl Crespo	(Spain) Youssef Ezzejjari		
Goa	(Serbia) Dejan Dražić	(Spain) Pol Moreno						
Inter Kashi	(Lithuania) Nauris Petkevičius	(Spain) Alfred Planas	(Spain) David Humanes	(Spain) Lluis Tarrés	(Spain) Mario Barco	(Spain) Sergio Llamas		
Jamshedpur	(Cameroon) Raphaël Messi Bouli	(France) Madih Talal	(Japan) Rei Tachikawa	(Nigeria) Stephen Eze	(Serbia) Lazar Ćirković	(Serbia) Nikola Stojanović		
Kerala Blasters	(Argentina) Franchu	(France) Kévin Yoke	(Morocco) Karim Benarif	(Senegal) Fallou Ndiaye	(Spain) Matías Hernández	(Spain) Víctor Bertomeu	(Scotland) Jai Quitongo (Germany) Marlon Roos-Trujillo	(Guinea) Oumar Bah
Mohammedan								
Mohun Bagan	(Australia) Dimitri Petratos	(Australia) Jamie Maclaren	(Australia) Jason Cummings	(Brazil) Robinho	(Scotland) Tom Aldred	(Spain) Alberto Rodríguez		
Mumbai City	(Argentina) Jorge Pereyra Díaz	(Finland) Joni Kauko	(Portugal) Nuno Reis	(Spain) Jorge Ortiz				
NorthEast United	(Spain) Andy Rodríguez	(Spain) Jairo Samperio	(Spain) Míchel Zabaco					
Odisha	(Spain) Carlos Delgado							
Punjab	(Bosnia and Herzegovina) Samir Zeljkovic	(Brazil) Pablo Santos	(Nigeria) Bede Osuji	(Nigeria) Effiong Nsungusi	(Spain) Dani Ramírez			

== League table ==
Pos	Team	Pld	W	D	L	GF	GA	GD	Pts	Qualification
1	East Bengal (C)	13	7	5	1	30	11	+19	26	Champions and Qualification for the Champions League Two qualifying playoffs (Note: As per Article 4 of entry regulations for AFC’s club competitions, each club needs to play a minimum of 24 matches per season in the domestic top division that runs for at least eight months, to receive direct slots in AFC club competitions. Since Indian clubs will play just 13 games, the ISL winners will enter the qualifying stage of the ACL2 instead of the group stage.)
2	Mohun Bagan	13	7	5	1	23	9	+14	26	
3	Mumbai City	13	7	4	2	17	9	+8	25	
4	Bengaluru	13	6	5	2	18	12	+6	23	
5	Jamshedpur	13	6	4	3	15	10	+5	22 (Note: Head-to-head points: Jamshedpur 3, Punjab 0.)	
6	Punjab	13	6	4	3	18	12	+6	22	
7	Goa	13	5	5	3	15	11	+4	20	Qualification for the Champions League Two qualifying playoffs (Note: Goa qualified for the AFC Champions League Two qualifying playoffs as the 2025–26 AIFF Super Cup winners.)
8	Kerala Blasters	13	5	2	6	15	17	−2	17	
9	NorthEast United	13	4	4	5	16	21	−5	16	
10	Inter Kashi	13	3	4	6	11	17	−6	13	
11	Odisha	13	2	5	6	14	22	−8	11 (Note: Head-to-head points: Odisha 3, Delhi 0.)	
12	Delhi	13	2	5	6	13	17	−4	11	
13	Chennaiyin	13	2	3	8	9	21	−12	9	
14	Mohammedan (R)	13	0	3	10	7	32	−25	3	Relegation to IFL

Source: Indian Super League
Rules for classification: 1) points; 2) goal difference; 3) number of goals scored; 4) head-to-head points; 5) head-to-head goal difference; 6) head-to-head goals scored; 7) fair play ranking; 8) drawing of lots.
(Note: Head-to-head record is used only after all the matches between the teams in question have been played).
(C) Champions; (R) Relegated

== Results ==
=== Match by match ===
Home \ Away	BEN	CHE	DEL	EAB	GOA	INK	JAM	KEB	MMD	MBG	MCI	NEU	ODI	PUN
Bengaluru			2–0					1–2		0–0	0–0	1–1		0–2
Chennaiyin	1–2		1–0	1–3	1–1	1–2			0–0					
Delhi						0–0	1–1	2–0	2–2				1–2	0–0
East Bengal	3–3		4–1		0–0		1–2	1–1	7–0			3–0	3–0	0–0
Goa	0–2		1–0			1–1				1–1	2–0		3–1	
Inter Kashi	1–3			1–2					1–0		1–2			
Jamshedpur	0–1	4–1			2–0	1–0			1–0	1–1	1–1		0–0	1–0
Kerala Blasters		0–1			2–1	1–2	2–0		3–1		0–1	1–1	2–1	1–3
Mohammedan	1–2				0–2						0–4			
Mohun Bagan		2–0	2–1	1–1		0–0		2–0	5–1		0–1		5–1	3–2
Mumbai City		1–0	2–2	1–2								1–1	1–0	
NorthEast United		4–1	0–3		0–2	3–2	2–1		2–0	0–1			1–4	
Odisha	1–1	1–1				0–0			1–1					2–3
Punjab		1–0			1–1	3–0			2–1		0–2	1–1		

Source: ISL Fixtures
Legend: Blue = home team win; Yellow = draw; Red = away team win.

=== Form ===
Team ╲ Round	1	2	3	4	5	6	7	8	9	10	11	12	13
Bengaluru	W	D	L	W	D	W	W	L	D	D	D	W	W
Chennaiyin	L	L	D	W	D	L	L	W	D	L	L	L	L
Delhi	L	L	L	D	D	W	W	L	D	D	L	D	L
East Bengal	W	W	L	D	D	W	W	D	W	W	D	D	W
Goa	D	W	W	D	D	D	L	W	W	W	L	D	L
Inter Kashi	D	D	W	L	L	L	W	W	L	L	D	D	L
Jamshedpur	W	W	W	W	L	D	D	D	L	W	W	L	D
Kerala Blasters	L	L	L	L	D	L	L	W	D	W	W	W	W
Mohammedan	L	L	L	L	L	L	L	D	D	D	L	L	L
Mohun Bagan	W	W	W	W	D	L	D	W	W	D	D	D	W
Mumbai City	W	W	D	D	W	W	W	D	L	D	L	W	W
NorthEast United	L	D	D	D	W	L	L	D	L	L	W	W	W
Odisha	D	D	L	W	L	L	D	L	L	D	W	L	D
Punjab	L	W	D	D	W	W	L	W	D	W	D	W	L

Source: ISL
W = Win; D = Draw; L = Lose

=== Position by round ===
Team ╲ Round	1	2	3	4	5	6	7	8	9	10	11	12	13
East Bengal	1	1	5	5	5	4	5	4	4	6	5	1	1
Mohun Bagan	2	2	1	1	1	2	2	2	1	1	2	2	2
Mumbai City	4	3	4	4	3	1	1	1	2	3	4	5	3
Bengaluru	3	5	7	6	6	5	3	5	5	5	6	3	4
Jamshedpur	5	4	2	2	2	3	4	3	6	4	1	6	5
Punjab	8	10	8	8	8	7	6	7	7	7	7	4	6
Goa	6	6	3	3	4	6	7	6	3	2	3	7	7
Kerala Blasters	13	12	12	13	12	13	13	13	11	9	9	8	8
NorthEast United	14	9	10	10	7	8	9	10	12	12	11	10	9
Inter Kashi	7	7	6	7	9	11	8	8	8	8	8	9	10
Odisha	8	8	9	11	11	9	10	11	13	13	13	12	11
Delhi	12	14	13	12	13	12	12	9	10	10	10	11	12
Chennaiyin	11	11	11	9	10	10	11	12	9	11	12	13	13
Mohammedan	10	13	14	14	14	14	14	14	14	14	14	14	14

Source: Indian Super League
= Champions; = Relegation

== Season statistics ==
As of 21 May 2026

=== Top scorers ===
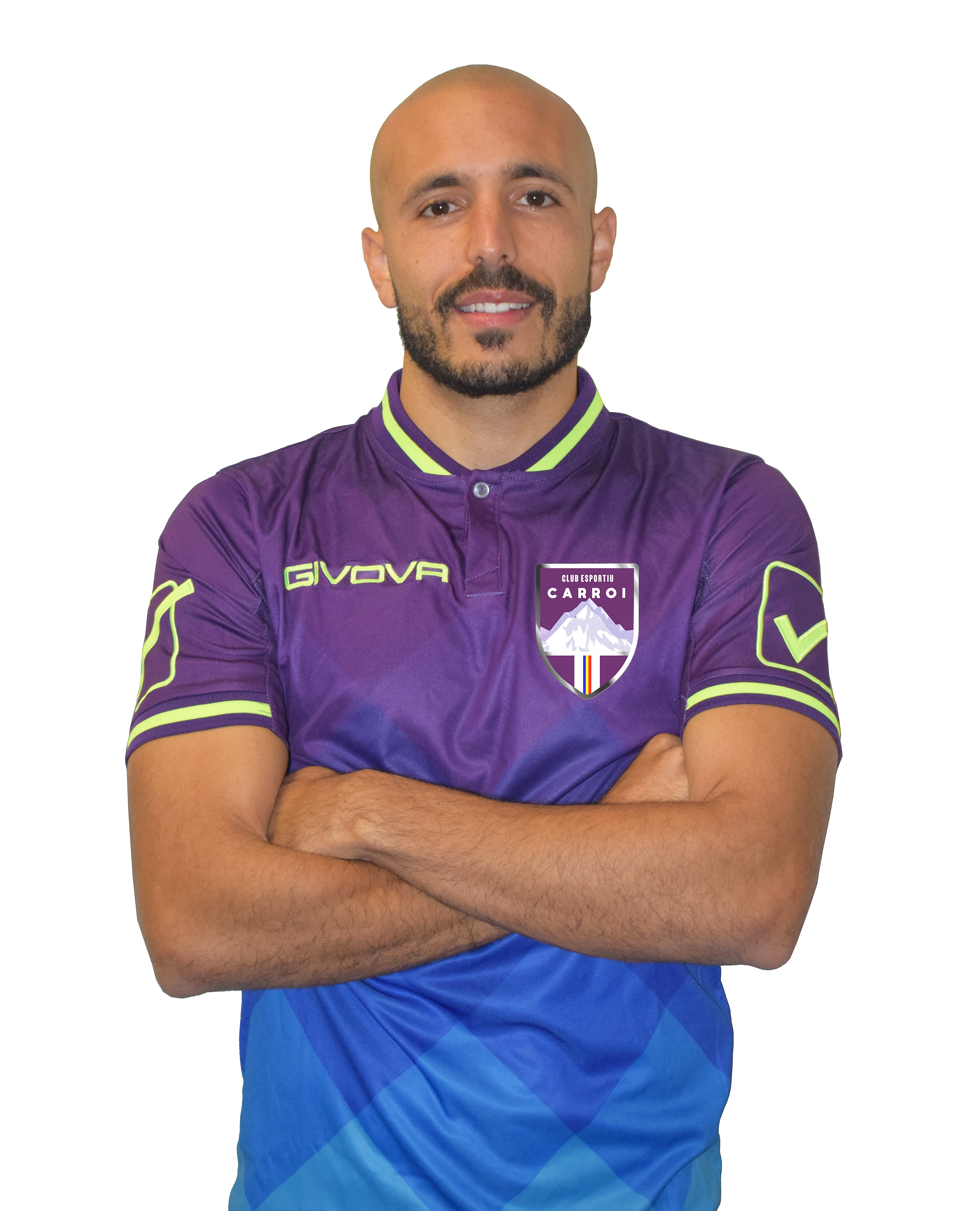
Youssef Ezzejjari won the Indian Super League Golden Boot with 11 goals.

Rank	Player	Team	Goals
1	(Spain) Youssef Ezzejjari	East Bengal	11
2	(Australia) Jamie Maclaren	Mohun Bagan	10
3	(Nigeria) Effiong Nsungusi	Punjab	7
4	(Serbia) Dejan Dražić	Goa	6
5	(Spain) Alfred Planas	Inter Kashi	5
5	(Serbia) Matija Babović	SC Delhi	5
7	(Spain) Dani Ramírez	Punjab	4
7	(India) Ryan Williams	Bengaluru	4
7	(Spain) Víctor Bertomeu	Kerala Blasters	4
7	(India) Edmund Lalrindika	East Bengal	4
7	(Argentina) Braian Sánchez	Bengaluru	4
7	(India) Lallianzuala Chhangte	Mumbai City	4

=== Top assists ===
Rank	Player	Team	Assists
1	(Brazil) Miguel Figueira	East Bengal	5
2	(India) Liston Colaco	Mohun Bagan	4
2	(India) Ebindas Yesudasan	Kerala Blasters	4
2	(India) Lalremtluanga Fanai	Bengaluru	4
5	(Argentina) Franchu	Kerala Blasters	3
5	(Spain) Alberto Noguera	Chennayin	3
5	(India) Subhasish Bose	Mohun Bagan	3
5	(Serbia) Dejan Dražić	Goa	3
5	(India) Vishnu PV	East Bengal	3
5	(Bosnia and Herzegovina) Samir Zeljković	Punjab	3
5	(Australia) Dimitri Petratos	Mohun Bagan	3
5	(India) Bipin Singh	East Bengal	3
5	(India) Lalthathanga Khawlhring	Odisha	3
5	(India) K Lalrinfela	Odisha	3

=== Clean sheets ===
Rank	Player	Team	Clean sheets
1	(India) Hrithik Tiwari	Goa	6
1	(India) Phurba Lachenpa	Mumbai City	6
1	(India) Vishal Kaith	Mohun Bagan	6
1	(India) Albino Gomes	Jamshedpur	6
1	(India) Prabhsukhan Singh Gill	East Bengal	6
1	(India) Gurpreet Singh Sandhu	Bengaluru	6
7	(India) Nora Fernandes	SC Delhi	4
7	(India) Arshdeep Singh	Punjab	4
9	(India) Shubham Dhas	Inter Kashi	3
9	(India) Mohammad Nawaz	Chennaiyin	3

=== Discipline ===
==== Player ====
- Most yellow cards: 6
  - Bijoy Varghese (Punjab)
- Most red cards: 1
  - 18 players

==== Club ====
- Most yellow cards: 39
  - NorthEast United
- Most red cards: 3
  - Punjab

== Awards ==
Award	Winner	Team	Ref.
Golden Ball	(Brazil) Miguel Figueira	East Bengal	
Golden Boot	(Spain) Youssef Ezzejjari	East Bengal	
Golden Glove	(India) Hrithik Tiwari	Goa	

== Attendance ==
As of 21 May 2026

=== Regular season ===
Pos	Team	Total	High	Low	Average	Change
1	Mohun Bagan	229,801	62,201	12,222	25,533	−28.6%
2	Bengaluru	92,235	21,714	9,614	15,373	+29.9%
3	East Bengal	130,408	22,899	233	14,490	−21.4%
4	Kerala Blasters	70,853	16,243	2,863	7,873	−50.5%
5	Jamshedpur	69,591	12,789	4,341	7,732	−45.9%
6	Delhi	44,517	10,087	3,523	7,420	+389.1%^{ǂ}
7	Inter Kashi	8,327	8,112	215	4,164	+502.6%^{†}
8	NorthEast United	32,358	7,473	1,739	4,045	−61.6%
9	Chennaiyin	21,956	6,389	2,623	3,659	−48.5%
10	Mumbai City	16,850	3,911	2,190	3,370	−9.7%
11	Goa	18,680	5,160	1,577	3,113	−69.8%
12	Punjab	19,257	3,897	2,534	3,210	+6.7%
13	Odisha	8,690	3,218	156	1,738	−77.3%
14	Mohammedan	4,927	4,240	340	1,642	−59.9%
	League total	768,450	62,201	156	8,634	−22.1%

Notes:
^{†}Inter Kashi played in the I-League in the 2024–25 season.
^{ǂ}SC Delhi played in the 2024–25 season as Hyderabad FC.

=== By home matches ===
Team \ Home Game	1	2	3	4	5	6	7	8	9	Total
Mohun Bagan	29,110	22,765	30,047	19,727	26,997	12,222	20,004	62,201	26,732	229,801
East Bengal	18,636	20,386	22,899	12,853	13,379	11,213	13,244	233 (Note: The matches were played in Goa)	17,565	130,408
Bengaluru	12,347	13,623	9,614	20,214	21,714	14,723	—N/a			92,235
Kerala Blasters	16,243	7,586	6,435	2,863	3,621	3,213	7,548	9,827	13,517	70,853
Jamshedpur	4,341	7,230	7,856	12,789	10,236	6,339	5,699	8,032	7,069	69,591
Delhi	6,732	8,153	7,761	8,261	3,523	10,087	—N/a			44,517
NorthEast United	7,473	6,379	3,564	3,847	3,221	3,342	1,739	2,793	—N/a	32,358
Chennaiyin	6,389	2,966	2,947	2,623	2,894	4,137	—N/a			21,956
Punjab	3,897	3,216	2,906	2,737	2,534	3,967	—N/a			19,257
Goa	1,577	5,160	2,532	2,237	4,820	2,354	—N/a			18,680
Mumbai City	3,426	3,911	2,190	3,674	3,649	—N/a				16,850
Odisha	2,421	3,218	2,678	217	156	—N/a				8,690
Inter Kashi	N/A (Note: The matches were played behind closed doors)	N/A	215	8,112	—N/a					8,327
Mohammedan	4,240	340	347	—N/a						4,927

Legend: Highest Lowest

== See also ==
- Men
  - 2025–26 Indian Football League (Tier II)
  - 2025–26 I-League 2 (Tier III)
  - 2025–26 I-League 3 (Tier IV)
  - 2025–26 Indian State Leagues (Tier V)
  - 2025–26 AIFF Super Cup
  - 2025 Durand Cup
  - 2026 Reliance Foundation Development League
- Women
  - 2025–26 Indian Women's League (Tier I)
  - 2025–26 Indian Women's League 2 (Tier II)
