= Mohammed Sanan =

Indian footballer (born 2004)

Mohammed Sanan K
Personal information
- Full name: Mohammed Sanan Kundoyi
- Date of birth: 5 April 2004 (age 22)
- Place of birth: Malappuram, Kerala, India
- Height: 1.66 m (5 ft 5 in)
- Position: Winger

Team information
- Current team: Kerala Blasters
- Number: 11

Youth career
- 2016–2023: RFYC

Senior career*
Years	Team	Apps	(Gls)
2023–2026	Jamshedpur	60	(8)
2026––	Kerala Blasters	3	(0)

International career^{‡}
2024–	India U23	9	(1)
2025–	India	7	(0)
- * Club domestic league appearances and goals as of 11 October 2026 ‡ National team caps and goals as of 22:00, 6 October 2026 (UTC)

Mohammed Sanan Kundoyi (born 5 April 2004) is an Indian professional footballer who plays as a winger for Indian Super League club Kerala Blasters and the India national football team.

== Early life ==
Sanan was born in Malappuram.

== Career ==
=== Reliance Foundation Young Champs ===
Sanan represented Reliance Foundation Young champs at 2022 Reliance Foundation Development League where he made six appearances and provided assist for opening goal against Mumbai City B. He again represented the club at 2023 Reliance Foundation Development League where scored four goals in fourteen appearances as RFYC topped their regional and national group but finished fourth overall which sealed their qualification spot for Next Gen Cup.

=== Jamshedpur ===
On 3 August 2023, He penned a three-year deal with Jamshedpur. 5 days later, he made his debut in a 5–0 loss to Mumbai City at 2023 Durand Cup where he played the full first half. On 25 September, Sanan made his Indian Super League debut coming in as a substitute in a goalless draw against East Bengal. On 1 November, he made his first league start against Mohun Bagan Super Giant and scored his first goal in an eventual 3–2 loss.

=== Kerala Blasters ===
In October 2026, Kerala Blasters announced the signing of Sanan on a three-year deal. He made his debut for the club on 11 October 2026 against Inter Kashi FC. He assisted Andre Green's second goal in the injury time of the second half and helped in a 2–0 victory.

== Career statistics ==
=== Club ===
As of match played 17 August 2026

Appearances and goals by club, season and competition
Club	Season	League			AIFF Super Cup		AFC		Other		Total	
Club	Season	Division	Apps	Goals	Apps	Goals	Apps	Goals	Apps	Goals	Apps	Goals
Jamshedpur	2023–24	Indian Super League	20	2	3	1	—		1 (Note: Appearance(s) in Durand Cup)	0	24	3
Jamshedpur	2024–25	Indian Super League	27	3	4	0	—		3	2	34	5
Jamshedpur	2025–26	Indian Super League	13	3	3	0	—		4	1	20	4
Jamshedpur	2026–27	— (Note: The club refused to participate in the league due to the decision of stopping senior team operations)	—		—		—		4	1	4	1
Jamshedpur	Total		60	8	10	1	—		12	4	82	13
Kerala Blasters	2026–27	Indian Super League	0	0	0	0	—		—		0	0
Career total			60	8	10	1	0	0	12	4	82	13

=== International ===
As of 6 October 2026

National team	Year	Apps	Goals
India	2025	1	0
India	2026	6	0
Total		7	0
