= Arrúa =

Arrúa is a surname of Basque origins. Notable people with the surname include:

- Saturnino Arrúa (born 1949) Paraguayan retired footballer
- Matías Arrúa (born 1983) Argentine footballer
- José Arrúa (born 1988) Paraguayan footballer
- Luis Arrúa (born 1988) Uruguay cantautor
