= List of Inter Kashi FC seasons =

Inter Kashi is an Indian association football club based in Varanasi, Uttar Pradesh, which competes in the Indian Super League, the top tier of Indian football. The club was formed in 2023 and it remains as the first professional club from Uttar Pradesh to compete at the national-level league. Inter Kashi started playing in the I-league. In 2026, they qualified for Indian Super League.

== Key ==
The symbols and colours used below:

- P = Played
- W = Games won
- D = Games drawn
- L = Games lost
- F = Goals for
- A = Goals against
- Pts. = Points
- Pos. = Final position
- IL = I-League
- ISL = Indian Super League
- F = Final
- Group = Group stage
- R16 = Round of 16
- QF = Quarter-finals
- DNQ = Did not qualify
- Em-dash (—) = Inter Kashi did not participate
- R1 = Round 1
- R2 = Round 2
- R3 = Round 3
- R4 = Round 4
- R5 = Round 5
- R6 = Round 6
- SF = Semi-finals
- 1st or W = Winners
- 2nd or RU = Runners-up
- 3rd or 2nd RU = Third place
- ↑ = Promoted
- ↓ = Relegated
- * = Top scorer in division
