= 2026–27 FC Goa season =

2026–27 season of FC Goa

FC Goa
2026–27 season
- Owner: Goan Football; Club Pvt. Ltd.
- President: Akshay Tandon
- Head Coach: (India) Gouramangi Singh
- Stadium: Fatorda Stadium (Capacity : 19,000)
- Indian Super League: 6th
- Federation Cup: TBD
- ACL Two: Preliminary round
- Challenge League: Group stage
| Home colours | Away colours | Third colours |
- All statistics correct as of 7 October 2026.

The 2026–27 FC Goa season is the club's 13th season since its establishment in 2014 as well as their 13th season in 2026–27 Indian Super League. In addition to the league, they will also compete in the 2027 Federation Cup, 2026–27 Challenge and ACL Two.

== Players ==
=== First-team squad ===
As of 7 October 2026

Note: Flags indicate national team as defined under FIFA eligibility rules; some limited exceptions apply. Players may hold more than one non-FIFA nationality.

| No. | Pos. | Nation | Player |
|---|---|---|---|
| 3 | DF | IND | Sandesh Jhingan (Captain) |
| 5 | MF | ESP | Álex Vallejo |
| 9 | FW | ESP | Christian Borrego |
| 7 | FW | ESP | Jorge Ortiz |
| 8 | MF | IND | Tomba Singh |
| 14 | DF | IND | Aakash Sangwan |
| 15 | DF | ESP | Álex Zalaya |
| 19 | FW | IND | Isak Ralte |
| 21 | MF | IND | Udanta Singh Kumam |
| 22 | MF | IND | Prachit Vishwas |
| 23 | MF | IND | Harsh Patre |
| 28 | MF | ARG | Franchu |
| 29 | DF | IND | Nim Dorjee |

| No. | Pos. | Nation | Player |
|---|---|---|---|
| 33 | GK | IND | Lionel Rymmei |
| 35 | DF | IND | Ronney Willson Kharbudon |
| 40 | FW | IND | Haodamlian Vaiphei |
| 41 | DF | IND | Sitroy Carvalho |
| 44 | FW | IND | Muhammed Nemil |
| 45 | GK | IND | Bob Jackson |
| 46 | MF | IND | Vellington Fernandes |
| 48 | DF | IND | Akash Singh |
| 72 | GK | IND | Lara Sharma |
| — | DF | IND | Rudra Ved |
| — | DF | IND | Saveme Tariang |
| — | MF | IND | Mervin Fernandes |
| — | FW | IND | KC Malsawmsanga |

=== Player stats ===
Key:
‡ On loan from another club * First appearance(s) for the club

- # = Squad number
- Pos = Playing position
- P = Number of games played
- G = Number of goals scored
- GK = Goalkeeper
- DF = Defender
- MF = Midfielder
- FW = Forward
- = Yellow cards
- = Red cards
- † Permanent player left club during the season
- ¤ Loaned to another club for part or all of season

Correct as of 10 October 2026. Starting appearances are listed first, followed by substitute appearances in parentheses where applicable.

| No. | Pos | Name | P | G | P | G | P | G | P | G | A yellow card | A red card | Notes |
| No. | Pos | Name | League | | Durand Cup | | League Cup | | Total | | Discipline | | Notes |
|---|---|---|---|---|---|---|---|---|---|---|---|---|---|
| 3 | DF | Sandesh Jhingan | 1 | 0 | 0 | 0 | 0 | 0 | 1 | 0 | 0 | 0 | |
| 5 | MF | Álex Vallejo | 1 | 0 | 0 | 0 | 0 | 0 | 1 | 0 | 0 | 0 | |
| 9 | FW | Christian Borrego | 1 | 1 | 0 | 0 | 0 | 0 | 1 | 1 | 0 | 0 | |
| 7 | FW | Jorge Ortiz | 1 | 0 | 0 | 0 | 0 | 0 | 1 | 0 | 0 | 0 | |
| 8 | MF | Tomba Singh | 1 | 0 | 0 | 0 | 0 | 0 | 1 | 0 | 0 | 0 | |
| 14 | DF | Aakash Sangwan | 1 | 0 | 0 | 0 | 0 | 0 | 1 | 0 | 0 | 0 | |
| 15 | DF | Álex Zalaya | 1 | 0 | 0 | 0 | 0 | 0 | 1 | 0 | 0 | 0 | |
| 19 | FW | Isak Vanlalruatfela | 1 | 0 | 0 | 0 | 0 | 0 | 1 | 0 | 0 | 0 | |
| 21 | MF | Udanta Singh Kumam | 1 | 0 | 0 | 0 | 0 | 0 | 1 | 0 | 0 | 0 | |
| 22 | MF | Prachit Vishwas | 1 | 0 | 0 | 0 | 0 | 0 | 1 | 0 | 0 | 0 | |
| 23 | MF | Harsh Patre | 1 | 0 | 0 | 0 | 0 | 0 | 1 | 0 | 0 | 0 | |
| 28 | MF | Franchu | 1 | 0 | 0 | 0 | 0 | 0 | 1 | 0 | 0 | 0 | |
| 29 | DF | Nim Dorjee Tamang | 0 | 0 | 0 | 0 | 0 | 0 | 0 | 0 | 0 | 0 | |
| 33 | GK | Lionel Rymmei | 0 | 0 | 0 | 0 | 0 | 0 | 0 | 0 | 0 | 0 | |
| 35 | DF | Ronney Willson Kharbudon | 1 | 0 | 0 | 0 | 0 | 0 | 1 | 0 | 0 | 0 | |
| 40 | FW | Haodamlian Vaiphei | 0 | 0 | 0 | 0 | 0 | 0 | 0 | 0 | 0 | 0 | |
| 41 | DF | Sitroy Carvalho | 0 | 0 | 0 | 0 | 0 | 0 | 0 | 0 | 0 | 0 | |
| 44 | FW | Muhammed Nemil | 1 | 0 | 0 | 0 | 0 | 0 | 1 | 0 | 1 | 0 | |
| 45 | GK | Bob Jackson | 1 | 0 | 0 | 0 | 0 | 0 | 1 | 0 | 0 | 0 | |
| 46 | MF | Vellington Fernandes | 0 | 0 | 0 | 0 | 0 | 0 | 0 | 0 | 0 | 0 | |
| 48 | DF | Akash Singh | 1 | 0 | 0 | 0 | 0 | 0 | 1 | 0 | 1 | 0 | |
| 72 | GK | Lara Sharma | 0 | 0 | 0 | 0 | 0 | 0 | 0 | 0 | 0 | 0 | |
