= Sumit Sharma Brahmacharimayum =

Indian football player

Sumit Sharma
Personal information
- Full name: Sumit Sharma Brahmacharimayum
- Date of birth: 5 March 2007 (age 19)
- Place of birth: Manipur, India
- Height: 1.83 m (6 ft 0 in)
- Position: Centre-back

Team information
- Current team: Kerala Blasters
- Number: 30

Youth career
- –2025: Classic FA

Senior career*
Years	Team	Apps	(Gls)
2025–	Kerala Blasters	2	(0)

International career
2025–	India U20	10	(0)
2025–	India U23	2	(0)
- * Club domestic league appearances and goals as of 11 October 2026

Sumit Sharma Brahmacharimayum (Meitei: Brahmacharimayum Sumit Sharma, 05 March 2007) is an Indian professional footballer who plays as a centre-back for Indian Super League club Kerala Blasters and captains the India national under-20 football team.

== Career ==
=== Club career ===
Sumit is the youth product of Classic Football Academy, Imphal, Manipur. On 7 July 2025, he was signed by the Indian Super League club Kerala Blasters on a multi-year deal. Sumit made his debut for the club on 11 October 2026 against Inter Kashi FC in a 2–0 victory.

=== International career ===
On 24 January 2025, Sumit debuted for the India U20 team. He also became the captain of the team. He also debuted for the India U23 team, on 13 October 2025.
