= Vibin Mohanan =

Indian footballer (born 2003)

Personal information
- Full name: Vibin Mohanan
- Date of birth: 6 February 2003 (age 23)
- Place of birth: Thrissur, Kerala, India
- Height: 1.73 m (5 ft 8 in)
- Positions: Central midfielder; defensive midfielder

Team information
- Current team: Kerala Blasters
- Number: 8

Youth career
- 2012–2017: Kerala Police Academy
- 2017–2020: Kerala Blasters

Senior career*
| Years | Team | Apps | (Gls) |
| 2020–2023 | Kerala Blasters B | 9 | (0) |
| 2020–2022 | → Indian Arrows (loan) | 29 | (1) |
| 2022– | Kerala Blasters | 60 | (3) |

International career^{‡}
| 2022 | India U20 | 4 | (0) |
| 2023–2025 | India U23 | 9 | (3) |
| 2024 | India | 1 | (0) |
Medal record
Men's football
Representing India
SAFF U-20 Championship
| Winner | 2022 India |
- * Club domestic league appearances and goals as of 18 October 2026 ‡ National team caps and goals as of 22:32, 18 November 2024 (UTC)

Vibin Mohanan (born 6 February 2003) is an Indian professional footballer who plays as a midfielder and captains for Indian Super League club Kerala Blasters.

== Club career ==
=== Kerala Blasters ===
==== Youth and early career ====
When he was nine, Vibin joined the Kerala Police Football Academy in 2012 where he was trained under I.M. Vijayan. In 2017, Vibin was selected into the Kerala Blasters U-15 team where he played for the side in the Hero Junior League. Vibin made his first professional appearance for Indian Arrows on 10 January 2021 against Churchill Brothers by coming as a substitute on second half. He scored his first goal for the Arrows on 2 April 2022 against Real Kashmir.

==== 2022–2023: Rise to the first team ====
After spending two seasons on loan with Indian Arrows, Vibin returned to the Blasters. In August 2022, with the first team preparing for the 2022–23 Indian Super League season, Kerala Blasters fielded their reserves for the 2022 Durand Cup, where Vibin was also included in the squad for the tournament. He made his debut for the side on 19 August 2022 against Sudeva Delhi FC which ended in a draw. He made five appearances for the side and provided one assist during the tournament.

In October 2022, Vibin got promoted into the senior team after he was included in the Blasters squad for the 2022–23 Indian Super League season. He made his first team debut for the Blasters when he came on in the 84th minute during a 4–0 loss against Mumbai City on 8 January 2023.

Vibin was included in the Blasters' starting eleven for the first time against Hyderabad on 26 February, which the Blasters lost 1–0, where he played for the entire 90 minutes. In July 2023, the club sent Vibin to Greece for a one-month training stint with the Greek First Division club OFI.

==== 2023–2024: mainstay at the club ====
On 18 August 2023, Vibin provided his first ever assist for the senior team during the 2023 Durand cup group stage in a match against Bengaluru FC reserves, which ended in 2–2 draw. In the next match against Indian Air Force on 21 August, he provided two assists, helping the Blasters in a 5–0 victory.

Vibin played his first match of the 2023–24 Indian Super League season on 9 September against Bengaluru FC by coming as a substitute in the injury time. In the absence of Jeakson Singh, who suffered a shoulder injury in October, Vibin cemented his place in the team.

In December 2023, Vibin was awarded the Indian Super League's Emerging Player of the Month for November. He executed 112 successful passes, maintaining an 84.9% success rate, including 18 successful long passes, the second-highest among outfield players during this period. Vibin also won possession 25 times, more than any other player in November, and triumphed in 13 duels.

He has been also crucial for the Blasters’ midfield, which has lacked creativity due to the absence of Adrian Luna at the beginning of the season. Vibin sustained an injury during the Blasters' home win against Mumbai City FC on 24 December. He came back to action on 24 February 2024 against FC Goa in a 4–0 victory. Vibin scored his first goal for the Blasters on 13 March against Mohun Bagan SG in a 3–4 loss at home.

==== 2024–present: Contract extension and club captaincy ====
After an impressive individual season, Vibin signed a four-year contract extension with the Blasters' till 2029 on 18 September 2024. On 11 October 2026, in the absence of Adrian Luna, Vibin captained the Blasters for the first time in the first match of the 2026–27 Indian Super League season against Inter Kashi. He scored the opening goal for the Blasters and helped them in a 2–0 victory. Ahead of the match against Mumbai City on 25 October, manager Ashley Westwood announced that Vibin would succeed Adrián Luna as club captain for the 2026–27 season, citing his preference for an Indian captain as a mark of respect for Indian football.

== International career ==
=== Youth ===
In June 2022, Vibin was included in the final 23-member squad of the Indian under-20 national team to participate in the 2022 SAFF U-20 Championship. He made his debut for the side on 27 July in a 2–0 loss against Bangladesh. He made four appearances in the tournament and helped his side to win the title for the fourth time in its history.

In September 2023, Vibin was included in the squad of the Indian under-23 national team to participate in the 2024 AFC U-23 Asian Cup qualification. He made his debut against China on 9 September 2023 in a 2–1 loss.

=== Senior ===
In May 2024, Vibin was called up for the Indian national senior team, but he withdrew due to personal reasons. On 4 November 2024, he was included in the 26-member squad for the friendly match against Malaysia on 18 November. He made his debut by coming as a substitute for Brandon Fernandes in the final minutes of the injury time of the game which ended in 1–1 draw.

== Style of play ==
Though primarily plays as a box-to-box midfielder, Vibin is known for his versatility. He can also play as a defensive midfielder playing in a deeper role and is capable of operating in both single-pivot and double-pivot systems.

== Career statistics ==
=== Club ===
As of match played till 11 October 2026

Club statistics
| Club | Season | League | | | National Cup | | Continental | | Other | | Total | |
| Club | Season | Division | Apps | Goals | Apps | Goals | Apps | Goals | Apps | Goals | Apps | Goals |
|---|---|---|---|---|---|---|---|---|---|---|---|---|
| Indian Arrows | 2020–21 | I-League | 12 | 0 | 0 | 0 | — | | — | | 12 | 0 |
| Indian Arrows | 2021–22 | I-League | 17 | 1 | 0 | 0 | — | | — | | 17 | 1 |
| Indian Arrows | Total | | 29 | 1 | 0 | 0 | 0 | 0 | 0 | 0 | 29 | 1 |
| Kerala Blasters | 2022–23 | Indian Super League | 4 | 0 | 2 | 0 | — | | 0 | 0 | 6 | 0 |
| Kerala Blasters | 2023–24 | Indian Super League | 19 | 1 | 0 | 0 | — | | 2 | 0 | 21 | 1 |
| Kerala Blasters | 2024–25 | Indian Super League | 20 | 0 | 0 | 0 | — | | 0 | 0 | 20 | 0 |
| Kerala Blasters | 2025–26 | Indian Super League | 13 | 1 | 0 | 0 | — | | 0 | 0 | 13 | 1 |
| Kerala Blasters | 2026–27 | Indian Super League | 1 | 1 | 0 | 0 | — | | 0 | 0 | 1 | 1 |
| Kerala Blasters | Total | | 57 | 3 | 2 | 0 | 0 | 0 | 2 | 0 | 61 | 3 |
| Career totals | | | 86 | 4 | 2 | 0 | 0 | 0 | 2 | 0 | 90 | 4 |

=== International ===
As of 18 November 2024

| National team | Year | Apps | Goals |
|---|---|---|---|
| India | 2024 | 1 | 0 |
| Total | | 1 | 0 |

== Honours ==
India U20

- SAFF U-20 Championship: 2022

Individual

- Indian Super League Emerging Player of the Month: November 2023
