= Matías Arrúa =

Argentine footballer

Personal information
- Full name: Matías Nicolás Arrúa
- Date of birth: 16 April 1983 (age 43)
- Place of birth: Mar del Plata, Argentina
- Height: 1.70 m (5 ft 7 in)
- Position: Attacking midfielder

Senior career*
Years	Team	Apps	(Gls)
2003–2004	Quilmes MdP	0	(0)
2005–2006	Alvarado	5	(0)
2006	Amigos Unidos	0	(0)
2006–2007	Cadetes de San Martín	30	(10)
2007–2010	Unión Santa Fe	41	(2)
2010–2011	Unión MdP	29	(6)
2011–2012	Boca Río Gallegos	29	(4)
2012	Unión Sunchales	13	(5)
2013–2014	Curicó Unido	41	(4)
2014–2015	Deportes Temuco	26	(2)
2015–2016	Unión La Calera	25	(4)
2016–2017	San Marcos	17	(2)
2017–2018	Ñublense	6	(0)
2019	Ferro General Pico	4	(0)
- * Club domestic league appearances and goals

Matías Nicolás Arrúa (born 16 April 1983) is an Argentine former professional footballer who played as an attacking midfielder.

== Teams ==
- (Argentina) Quilmes de Mar del Plata 2003–2004
- (Argentina) Alvarado 2005–2006
- (Argentina) Amigos Unidos de Balcarce 2006
- (Argentina) Cadetes de San Martín 2006–2007
- (Argentina) Unión de Santa Fe 2007–2010
- (Argentina) Unión de Mar del Plata 2010–2011
- (Argentina) Boca Río Gallegos 2011–2012
- (Argentina) Unión de Sunchales 2012
- (Chile) Curicó Unido 2013–2014
- (Chile) Deportes Temuco 2014–2015
- (Chile) Unión La Calera 2015–2016
- (Chile) San Marcos de Arica 2016–2017
- (Chile) Ñublense 2017–2018
- (Argentina) Ferro Carril Oeste (General Pico) 2019
