= Andre Green =

English footballer (born 1998)

Personal information
- Full name: Andre Jay Green
- Date of birth: 26 July 1998 (age 28)
- Place of birth: Solihull, England
- Height: 5 ft 11 in (1.80 m)
- Positions: Winger; forward

Team information
- Current team: Kerala Blasters
- Number: 9

Youth career
- 2006–2016: Aston Villa

Senior career*
Years	Team	Apps	(Gls)
2015–2020	Aston Villa	40	(2)
2018–2019	→ Portsmouth (loan)	6	(1)
2019–2020	→ Preston North End (loan)	4	(0)
2019–2020	→ Charlton Athletic (loan)	13	(2)
2021	Sheffield Wednesday	13	(0)
2021–2023	Slovan Bratislava	51	(11)
2023–2025	Rotherham United	22	(3)
2025–2026	Panserraikos	11	(0)
2026	AVS	5	(0)
2026–	Kerala Blasters	3	(1)

International career
2013–2014	England U16	4	(0)
2015	England U17	3	(0)
2016	England U18	4	(0)
2016	England U19	3	(0)
2017	England U20	2	(0)
- * Club domestic league appearances and goals as of 11 October 2026

Andre Jay Green (born 26 July 1998) is an English professional footballer who plays as a winger or forward for Indian Super League club Kerala Blasters. He played internationally for England, up to under-20 level.

== Club career ==
=== Aston Villa ===
Green joined Aston Villa at the age of nine and progressed through the club's academy. He made his club and Premier League debut on 13 March 2016, coming off the bench for Jordan Veretout in a 2–0 loss to Tottenham Hotspur. In doing so, he became the fifth youngest player to ever represent the club, behind only Jimmy Brown, Rushian Hepburn-Murphy, Gareth Barry and Jonathan Bewers.

Following Aston Villa's relegation the season before, Green was linked with a move to a host of Premier League clubs but opted to sign a new three-year contract with Aston Villa in August 2016. Green made his first league start for the club at home against Preston in January 2017. He scored his first goal for Aston Villa in a 4-2 win against Norwich City on 19 August 2017.

==== Loan to Portsmouth ====
After struggling with an injury that kept him out of much of the 2017–18 season, Green found it difficult to get into the Aston Villa first team, and on 29 August 2018, he signed for Portsmouth on a season-long loan, dropping down a division to League 1. After missing two months through injury, he scored his first goal for Portsmouth in an EFL Trophy tie against Tottenham Hotspur Under 23s on 13 November 2018. On 5 January 2019, Green scored a last minute winner as Portsmouth won 1–0 to upset EFL Championship leaders Norwich City FC in the FA Cup third round at Carrow Road. On 17 January 2019, Green was recalled from his loan spell.

=== Return to Aston Villa ===
In January 2019, Green was recalled to Aston Villa. Portsmouth manager Kenny Jackett said that he believed that new Villa coach Dean Smith wanted to increase the quota of homegrown players in the squad. His first appearance back was against Hull City in a 2–2 draw. Green scored the third goal in a comeback against Sheffield United at Villa Park, Sheffield United had a 3–0 lead with 8 minutes, plus injury time remaining – before Villa scored three goals in quick succession with Green scoring in injury time.

==== Loans to Preston North End and Charlton Athletic ====
On 1 August 2019, Green joined Championship side Preston North End on a season-long loan deal. On 13 August 2019, Green scored his first goal for the club on his first team debut against Bradford City in the EFL Cup.

On 2 January 2020, Green joined Championship side Charlton Athletic on a loan until the end of the 2019–20 season. Green scored his first goal for Charlton in a 2–1 away defeat to Preston North End.

On 25 June 2020, it was announced that Green would be released by Aston Villa, signing a contract extension with them to allow him to complete his loan spell at Charlton.

=== Sheffield Wednesday ===
On 14 January 2021, he joined Sheffield Wednesday, signing an 18-month contract. He would make his debut in a FA Cup game against Everton, where he would only play the opening half of the match.

=== Slovan Bratislava ===
On 19 August 2021, Green was named in the Slovan Bratislava squad registered on the UEFA website for a Europa League tie against Olympiacos. He did not travel with the club to their away leg of the game - but Sheffield Wednesday confirmed later that night that Green had joined the Slovak First Football League side for an undisclosed fee. He became the first Englishman to feature for Slovakia's most successful club.

Green made his Fortuna Liga debut on 22 August 2021, in a 1–0 away victory over Sereď. He scored his first goal for the club on 26 August 2021, in a 2–2 Europa League draw to Olympiacos. He would score his first career hattrick in a 7–0 cup victory over Jednota Malinec. On 3 April 2022, Slovan defeated Spartak Trnava to effectively seal the Slovak First Football League title, Green's first major trophy. Green stated that this justified his decision to leave England and pursue a career in Slovakia.

=== Rotherham United ===
On 2 August 2023, Green returned to England signing with Championship club Rotherham United on a free transfer, following the expiry of his Slovan Bratislava contract. In October 2023, Green suffered a ruptured Achilles tendon in a training session, which was estimated to keep him out for around a year.

Green departed the club at the end of the 2024–25 season.

=== Panserraikos ===
On 8 July 2025, Green joined Super League Greece club Panserraikos on a two-year deal.

=== AVS ===
On 2 February 2026, Green joined Primeira Liga side AVS on a free transfer, signing a contract to the end of the season with an option for another year.

=== Kerala Blasters ===
On 6 October 2026, Green joined the Indian Super League side Kerala Blasters on a free transfer. He signed the contract till the end of 2026–27 season. Green made his debut for the club on 11 October 2026 against Inter Kashi. He played the entire 90 minutes and also scored the second goal of the match helping the Blasters in a 2–0 victory.

== International career ==
Green represented England at under-17 level.

== Career statistics ==
As of match played 16 May 2026

Appearances and goals by club, season and competition
Club	Season	League			National cup		League cup		Other		Total	
Club	Season	Division	Apps	Goals	Apps	Goals	Apps	Goals	Apps	Goals	Apps	Goals
Aston Villa	2015–16	Premier League	2	0	0	0	0	0	—		2	0
Aston Villa	2016–17	Championship	15	0	1	0	1	0	–		17	0
Aston Villa	2017–18	Championship	5	1	1	0	1	0	—		7	1
Aston Villa	2018–19	Championship	18	1	0	0	1	0	3 (Note: Three appearances in the Championship play-offs)	0	22	1
Aston Villa	2019–20	Premier League	0	0	0	0	0	0	—		0	0
Aston Villa	Total		40	2	2	0	3	0	3	0	48	2
Portsmouth (loan)	2018–19	League One	6	1	2	2	0	0	4 (Note: Four appearances in the EFL Trophy)	2	12	5
Preston North End (loan)	2019–20	Championship	4	0	0	0	2	1	—		6	1
Charlton Athletic (loan)	2019–20	Championship	13	2	1	0	—		—		14	2
Sheffield Wednesday	2020–21	Championship	11	0	1	0	—		—		12	0
Sheffield Wednesday	2021–22	League One	2	0	0	0	1	0	0	0	3	0
Sheffield Wednesday	Total		13	0	1	0	1	0	0	0	15	0
Slovan Bratislava	2021–22	Slovak First Football League	26	5	6	2	—		7 (Note: One appearance and one goal in UEFA Europa League, six appearances and four goals in UEFA Europa Conference League)	5	35	12
Slovan Bratislava	2022–23	Slovak First Football League	25	6	5	3	—		12 (Note: Three appearances in UEFA Champions League, two appearances and two goals in UEFA Europa League and seven appearances in UEFA Europa Conference League)	2	42	11
Slovan Bratislava	Total		51	11	11	5	—		19	7	77	23
Rotherham United	2023–24	Championship	9	0	0	0	1	0	—		10	0
Rotherham United	2024–25	League One	13	3	0	0	0	0	3 (Note: Two appearances in the EFL Trophy)	0	16	3
Rotherham United	Total		22	3	0	0	1	0	3	0	26	3
Panserraikos	2025–26	Super League Greece	11	0	1	0	—		—		12	0
AVS	2025–26	Primeira Liga	5	0	0	0	—		—		5	0
Kerala Blasters	2026–27	Indian Super League	1	1	0	0	—		—		1	1
Career total			165	19	18	7	7	1	29	9	215	36

== Honours ==
Aston Villa Under-23s

- Premier League Cup: 2017–18

Aston Villa

- EFL Championship play-offs: 2019

Slovan Bratislava

- Fortuna Liga: 2021–22, 2022–23
