= Fallou Ndiaye =

Senegalese footballer (born 2001)

Personal information
- Date of birth: 10 November 2001 (age 25)
- Place of birth: Thiaroye, Senegal
- Height: 1.98 m (6 ft 6 in)
- Position: Centre-back

Team information
- Current team: Kerala Blasters
- Number: 44

Youth career
- –2021: AS Douanes
- 2021–2022: Gent

Senior career*
Years	Team	Apps	(Gls)
2022–2023	Arles	8	(0)
2023	FC Haka	22	(2)
2024–2026	SJK	23	(4)
2026–	Kerala Blasters	10	(2)
- * Club domestic league appearances and goals as of 18 October 2026

Fallou Ndiaye (born 10 November 2001) is a Senegalese professional footballer who plays as a centre-back for Indian Super League club Kerala Blasters.

== Career ==
=== Youth career ===
In 2021, Ndiaye joined the youth setup of Belgian club Gent. During his time at Gent, he continued his development as a central defender and gained experience in European football environments.

=== Arles ===
Ndiaye began his senior professional career with French club AC Arles in 2022. During the 2022–23 season he made eight appearances for the club in league competition, gaining his first experience in senior professional football.

=== FC Haka ===
In 2023, Ndiaye moved to Finland to join FC Haka in the Veikkausliiga, the top tier of Finnish football. He quickly became a regular starter in defence and made 22 league appearances during the season. Ndiaye also scored two goals, demonstrating his effectiveness during set pieces due to his height and aerial ability.

=== SJK ===
In 2024, Ndiaye signed with SJK. During the season he played an important role in the team's defensive line and made 23 league appearances, scoring four goals. On 4 October 2024, Ndiaye was given a two-match ban by the disciplinary committee of the Finnish FA, for hitting Martti Haukioja in the head in a Veikkausliiga match between SJK Seinäjoki and VPS on 28 September 2024. At the end of the season, SJK exercised their option but Ndiaye refused to renew his visa and return to the team.

=== Kerala Blasters ===
After his spell in Finland, Ndiaye joined Kerala Blasters FC in the Indian Super League.

== Career statistics ==
As of 18 May 2026

Appearances and goals by club, season and competition
Club	Season	League			National cup (Note: Includes Suomen Cup)		League cup (Note: Includes Finnish League Cup)		Continental		Total	
Club	Season	Division	Apps	Goals	Apps	Goals	Apps	Goals	Apps	Goals	Apps	Goals
Arlés	2022–23	Régional 1	8	0	—		—		—		8	0
Haka	2023	Veikkausliiga	22	2	1	1	5	0	1 (Note: Appearance(s) in UEFA Conference League)	0	29	3
SJK Seinäjoki	2024	Veikkausliiga	23	4	4	1	—		—		27	5
Kerala Blasters	2025–26	Indian Super League	9	2	0	0	—		—		9	2
Kerala Blasters	2026–27	Indian Super League	0	0	0	0	—		—		0	0
Career total			62	8	5	2	5	0	1	0	73	10
