= Sreekuttan M. S. =

Indian footballer (born 2004)

Personal information
- Full name: Sreekuttan Manikandan Sreedevi
- Date of birth: 30 November 2004 (age 21)
- Place of birth: Thiruvananthapuram, Kerala, India
- Height: 1.81 m (5 ft 11 in)
- Position: Forward

Team information
- Current team: Kerala Blasters

Youth career
- –2022: Kerala Blasters

Senior career*
Years	Team	Apps	(Gls)
2022–2024	Kerala Blasters B	12	(2)
2022–	Kerala Blasters	6	(1)

International career^{‡}
2025–	India U23	8	(0)
- * Club domestic league appearances and goals as of 10 October 2026 ‡ National team caps and goals as of 22:00, 6 October 2026 (UTC)

Sreekuttan Manikandan Sreedevi is an Indian professional footballer who plays as a forward for the Indian Super League club Kerala Blasters FC.

== Club career ==
=== Youth career ===
In 2022, Sreekuttan joined the reserve team of Kerala Blasters. He played in different competitions for the reserve team including the Reliance Foundation Development League.

=== Kerala Blasters ===
Sreekuttan was promoted to the first team for the 2022–23 Indian Super League season, but did not made any appearance during the season. Sreekuttan made his official senior-team debut on 8 August 2024 in the 2024 Durand Cup against Central Industrial Security Force football team by coming as a substitute. Sreekutan scored his first goal for Kerala Blasters against Mohun Bagan Super Giant on 26 April 2025. In July 2025, Kerala Blasters announced that Sreekuttan had signed a contract extension keeping him at the club until May 2027. Sreekuttan made his Indian Super League debut on 14 February 2026 against Mohun Bagan Super Giant. He scored his first ever ISL goal by coming off the bench in a 3–1 victory against Mohammedan SC at home on 10 May 2026.
