= Franchu =

Argentine footballer (born 1998)

Personal information
- Full name: Francisco Feuillassier Abalo
- Date of birth: 12 May 1998 (age 28)
- Place of birth: Mar del Plata, Argentina
- Height: 1.72 m (5 ft 8 in)
- Positions: Attacking midfielder; winger

Team information
- Current team: Goa

Youth career
- 2003–2008: Cadetes San Martín
- 2009–2011: Real Madrid
- 2011–2016: Rayo Vallecano
- 2016–2017: Real Madrid

Senior career*
Years	Team	Apps	(Gls)
2016–2020	Real Madrid B	61	(6)
2017–2021	Real Madrid	0	(0)
2020–2021	→ Fuenlabrada (loan)	32	(1)
2021–2023	Eibar	8	(0)
2022–2023	→ Cartagena (loan)	27	(2)
2023–2025	Diósgyőr	27	(3)
2025–2026	Karmiotissa	8	(0)
2026	Kerala Blasters	6	(1)
2026–	Goa	2	(0)
- * Club domestic league appearances and goals as of 28 October 2026

Francisco Feuillassier Abalo (born 12 May 1998), commonly known as Franchu, is an Argentinian professional footballer who plays as an attacking midfielder or winger for Indian Super League club Goa.

== Club career ==
Born in Mar del Plata, Franchu joined Real Madrid's La Fábrica in March 2009 at the age of ten, from Cadetes de San Martín. Released by the club in 2011, he spent five years at Rayo Vallecano before rejoining Los Blancos in July 2016.

Franchu made his senior debut with the reserves on 3 September 2016, coming on as a late substitute for goalscorer Sergio Díaz in a 3–2 Segunda División B home win against SD Amorebieta. Definitely promoted to Castilla ahead of the 2017–18 season, he became a regular starter in Santiago Solari's side.

Franchu made his first team debut for Real Madrid on 26 October 2017, replacing fellow youth graduate Achraf Hakimi in a 2–0 away success over CF Fuenlabrada, for the season's Copa del Rey; he also featured in the second leg, starting and playing 60 minutes in a 2–2 draw at the Santiago Bernabéu Stadium. The following 7 April he scored his first senior goals, netting a brace for Castilla in a 4–2 home win against CCD Cerceda.

On 8 September 2020, Franchu joined Segunda División side CF Fuenlabrada on loan for the 2020–21 season. He made his professional debut on 13 September, replacing Mikel Iribas late into a 2–0 Segunda División home win against CD Lugo. Franchu scored his first goal for the club on 17 October, in a 1–1 draw away against FC Cartagena.

On 9 July 2021, Franchu joined second division side SD Eibar on a free transfer, signing a three-year deal. On 28 July of the following year, after featuring rarely, he was loaned to fellow league team Cartagena for one year. Upon returning, he terminated his link with the Armeros on 2 September 2023.

On 8 September 2023, Franchu joined Diósgyőri on a free transfer.

On 10 April 2026, Franchu joined Indian Super League club Kerala Blasters on a contract until the end of the season. On 11 April 2026, he made his debut for the club, scoring the winner in a 2–1 league win against Bengaluru FC.

== Personal life ==
Franchu's older brother Santiago is also a footballer. A midfielder, plays for Völsungur, he also played for Real Madrid and Rayo Vallecano before.

== Career statistics ==
=== Club ===
As of match played 18 May 2026

Appearances and goals by club, season and competition
Club	Season	League			National cup (Note: Includes Copa del Rey, Magyar Kupa)		Continental		Total	
Club	Season	Division	Apps	Goals	Apps	Goals	Apps	Goals	Apps	Goals
Real Madrid B	2016–17	Segunda División B	1	0	—		—		1	0
Real Madrid B	2017–18	Segunda Division B	32	2	—		—		32	2
Real Madrid B	2018–19	Segunda Division B	13	3	—		—		13	3
Real Madrid B	2019–20	Segunda Division B	15	1	—		—		15	1
Real Madrid B	Total		61	6	0	0	0	0	61	6
Real Madrid	2017–18	La Liga	0	0	2	0	0	0	2	0
Real Madrid	2018–19	La Liga	0	0	0	0	0	0	0	0
Real Madrid	Total		0	0	2	0	0	0	2	0
Fuenlabrada (loan)	2020–21	Segunda División	32	1	2	0	—		34	1
Eibar	2021–22	Segunda División	8	0	0	0	—		8	0
Cartagena (loan)	2022–23	Segunda División	27	0	2	1	—		29	1
Diósgyőri	2023–24	Nemzeti Bajnokság 1	13	2	2	1	—		15	3
Diósgyőri	2024–25	Nemzeti Bajnokság 1	14	1	1	0	—		15	1
Diósgyőri	Total		27	3	3	1	0	0	30	4
Karmiotissa	2024–25	Cypriot First Division	8	0	0	0	—		8	0
Kerala Blasters	2025–26	Indian Super League	6	1	0	0	—		6	1
Goa	2026–27	Indian Super League	0	0	0	0	—		0	0
Career total			169	11	9	2	0	0	178	13
