= Kévin Yoke =

French footballer (born 1996)

Personal information
- Date of birth: 23 June 1996 (age 30)
- Place of birth: Clamart, France
- Height: 1.82 m (6 ft 0 in)
- Position: Winger

Youth career
- –2018: Paris Saint-Germain

Senior career*
Years	Team	Apps	(Gls)
2018–2020	Paris Saint-Germain B	22	(4)
2020–2021	Le Mans	7	(0)
2022	Apollon Larissa	0	(0)
2022–2023	Trikala		
2023–2024	Aiolikos	32	(3)
2024–2025	Levadiakos	4	(0)
2025–2026	Chania	9	(0)
2026	Kerala Blasters	13	(1)
- * Club domestic league appearances and goals as of 18 May 2026

Kévin Yoke (born 23 June 1996) is a French professional footballer who plays as a winger. A two-footed attacker, he has played for clubs in France, Greece, and India.

== Club career ==
=== France ===
Yoke started his career at Paris Saint-Germain FC, where he played for the club's B team from 2018 to 2020. He then moved to Le Mans FC.

=== Greece ===
He moved to Greece during the 2021–2022 season. He played for Apollon Larissa F.C. and Aiolikos F.C. in Super League Greece 2. For the 2024–2025 season, he transferred to Levadiakos F.C. playing in Super League Greece. He continued to play in the second division of Greek football on loan to P.A.E. Chania. His record during his three seasons in Greece was three goals and 11 assists.

=== India ===
On 26 January 2026, Yoke joined Indian Super League club Kerala Blasters on a free transfer for the 2025–2026 season.

== Career statistics ==
As of match played 21 April 2025

Club	Season	League			Cup		Continental		Total	
Club	Season	Division	Apps	Goals	Apps	Goals	Apps	Goals	Apps	Goals
Paris Saint-Germain B	2018–19	National 2	9	1	–		–		9	1
Paris Saint-Germain B	2019–20	National 3	13	3	–		–		13	3
Paris Saint-Germain B	Total		22	4	–		–		22	4
Le Mans FC B	2020–21	National 3	1	0	–		–		1	0
Le Mans FC	2020–21	National	6	0	2 (Note: Appearances in Coupe de France)	0	–		8	0
Apollon Larissa	2022–23	Super League Greece 2	0	0	–		–		0	0
Trikala	2022–23	Gamma Ethniki	0	0	–		–		0	0
Aiolikos	2023–24	Super League Greece 2	32	3	–		–		32	3
Levadiakos	2024–25	Super League Greece	4	0	–		–		4	0
Panachaiki F.C.	2024–25	Super League Greece 2	8	0	–		–		8	0
P.A.E. Chania	2025–26	Super League Greece 2	9	0	–		–		9	0
Kerala Blasters	2025–26	Indian Super League	13	1	–		–		13	1
Career total			95	8	2	0	0	0	97	8
