= Emmanuel Imanishimwe =

Rwandan footballer

Personal information
- Date of birth: 1 January 1995 (age 31)
- Place of birth: Kigali, Rwanda
- Height: 1.80 m (5 ft 11 in)
- Position: Left-back

Team information
- Current team: Chennaiyin

Senior career*
Years	Team	Apps	(Gls)
2014–2015	Rayon Sports		
2015–2021	APR		
2021–2024	AS FAR	67	(0)
2024–2026	AEL Limassol	33	(0)
2026–	Chennaiyin	3	(0)

International career^{‡}
2016–	Rwanda	31	(0)
- * Club domestic league appearances and goals as of 26 October 2026 ‡ National team caps and goals as of 11:51, 30 January 2022 (UTC)

Emmanuel Imanishimwe (born 2 February 1995) is a Rwandan professional footballer who plays as a left-back for Indian Super League club Chennaiyin and Rwanda national team.

== Club career ==
In August 2021, he joined Moroccan club AS FAR on a three-year contract for a fee of 130 million Rwandan francs.
