= Cadetes de San Martín =

Argentine football club

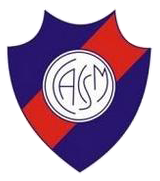
- Full name: Club Atlético Cadetes de San Martín
- Founded: 9 April 1939; 85 years ago
- Ground: Estadio José María Minella; Mar Del Plata, Argentina
- Capacity: 35,354
- League: Liga Marplatense de Fútbol
- Website: http://www.clubcadetes.com.ar/
Home colours	Away colours

Cadetes de San Martín is an Argentine football club, based in Mar Del Plata, Buenos Aires Province. The club currently plays at Liga Marplatense de Fútbol, the league where teams from General Pueyrredón Partido take part off

Cadetes had a brief run on Torneo Argentino C although the team was soon relegated to lower divisions.

== Titles ==
- Liga Marplatense: 2

2003, 2009
