= Ebindas Yesudasan =

Indian footballer

Personal information
- Date of birth: 19 April 2005 (age 21)
- Place of birth: Thiruvananthapuram, Kerala, India
- Positions: Midfielder; winger

Team information
- Current team: Kerala Blasters
- Number: 47

Youth career
- 2018–2019: Gokulam Kerala
- 2019–2022: Little Flower FA
- 2022: Kerala Blasters

Senior career*
Years	Team	Apps	(Gls)
2022–2025	Kerala Blasters B	6	(0)
2025–	Kerala Blasters	14	(0)
2025	→ Kannur Warriors (loan)	11	(1)

International career
2026–	India U23	2	(0)
- * Club domestic league appearances and goals as of 11 October 2026

Ebindas Yesudasan (born 19 April 2005) is an Indian professional footballer who plays as an midfielder or winger for Indian Super League club Kerala Blasters.

== Club career ==
=== Youth career ===
Born on Thiruvananthapuram, Ebindas started his football career at the age of 13, by joining Gokulam Kerala Academy at 2018. Next year, he joined Little Flower FA, Thiruvananthapuram and spent three years at the academy till 2022.

=== Kerala Blasters ===
==== 2022–2025: Kerala Blasters B and senior team debut ====
In March 2022, Ebindas was signed by the Indian Super League club Kerala Blasters. He was put in their reserve side, and played for them in the Reliance Foundation Development League. In August 2022, with the first team preparing for the 2022–23 Indian Super League season in UAE, Kerala Blasters fielded their reserves for the 2022 Durand Cup, where Ebindas was also included in the squad. He played four matches in the tournament. In April 2025, Ebindas was included in the Kerala Blasters' squad for the 2025 Super Cup. He made his official senior team debut for the club on 26 April 2025 against Mohun Bagan SG in a 2–1 defeat.

==== Loan to Kannur Warriors ====
On 11 November 2025 Ebindas was loaned to Super League Kerala club Kannur Warriors. He scored one goal for the club, played a pivotal role and helped them in becoming the 2025 Super League Kerala champions.

==== 2025–2026: Breakthrough season ====
After finishing the loan stint with Kannur Warriors, Ebindas returned to Kerala Blasters in December 2025. On 26 January 2026, he was promoted to the club's senior team on a permanent basis. He was included in the Blasters' squad for the 2025–26 Indian Super League season alongside other Blasters academy graduates Muhammad Ajsal and Jaganath Jayan. Ebindas made his Indian Super League debut for Kerala Blasters on 14 February 2026, starting in the club's 2–0 defeat against Mohun Bagan SG. He delivered his first assist for the club on March 14 against East Bengal FC helping to secure a 1–1 draw. Ebindas became crucial for the Blasters’ midfield and was a standout performer for the club amid their poor season. He registered five assists in his twelve appearances and equalled with Miguel Figueira as the top assist provider of the season.

==== 2026–present: Contract extension ====
On 8 October 2026, Kerala Blasters announced that Ebindas has signed a two-year contract extension with the club, that would keep him with them until 2028.

== International career ==
=== India Under-23 ===
On 22 March 2026, India U-23 head coach Naushad Moosa listed Ebindas in the 24-members squad for the 2026 Tri-Nation Series.

== Honours ==
India

- SAFF Championship: 2026
