= Karim Benarif =

Moroccan footballer

Personal information
- Date of birth: 20 January 1993 (age 33)
- Place of birth: Rabat, Morocco
- Height: 1.76 m (5 ft 9 in)
- Position: Central midfielder

Youth career
- –2012: AS FAR

Senior career*
Years	Team	Apps	(Gls)
2012–2016	AS FAR	59	(4)
2016–2022	FUS Rabat	85	(6)
2022–2023	MC Oujda	25	(2)
2023–2024	Al-Najaf	20	(0)
2024–2026	Karbala	31	(1)
2026	Kerala Blasters	3	(0)
- * Club domestic league appearances and goals as of 21:30, 22 May 2026 (UTC)

Karim Benarif (Arabic: كريم بنعريف; born 20 January 1993) is a Moroccan professional footballer who plays as a central midfielder. He had previously played in the Moroccan domestic league, Indian league, as well as the Iraqi league.

In 2014, he was called up for the Morocco national under-23 football team.

== Career ==
Benarif started his career in the Moroccan domestic league playing for several clubs, such as AS FAR, Fath Union Sport and MC Oujda.

=== FUS Rabat ===
Benarif joined FUS Rabat in July 2016.

He scored the only goal for Fath Union (FUS Rabat) against CS Sfaxien in the first leg of the quarter final of the 2017 CAF Confederation Cup. His team ended up qualifying to the semi-final then losing to TP Mazembe.

In 2018, he was on a loan transfer to Olympique Safi for a single season.

In December 2018, he had to undergo a surgery, for a knee ligament injury he suffered during a match against his former team, AS FAR. He then had to retire for the rest of the 2018–19 season. He had previously been excluded from the first team by the then coach Walid Regragui due to poor performance, and played for a while with the second team.

In August 2021, his contract with FUS was extended by another two years.

=== MC Oujda ===
In August 2022, he signed with MC Oujda.

=== Al-Najaf ===
On 30 September 2023 he moved to Iraqi side Al-Najaf SC.

=== Kerala Blasters ===
On 29 March 2026, Indian Super League club Kerala Blasters announced the signing of Benarif on a contract until the end of the season.
