= Bikash Yumnam =

Indian footballer (born 2003)

Personal information
- Date of birth: 6 September 2003 (age 23)
- Place of birth: Lilong Chajing, Manipur, India
- Height: 1.83 m (6 ft 0 in)
- Position: Centre-back

Team information
- Current team: Kerala Blasters
- Number: 63

Youth career
- –2017: Chajing Inat
- 2017–2019: Minerva Punjab

Senior career*
Years	Team	Apps	(Gls)
2019–2023	RoundGlass Punjab	20	(1)
2020	→ Indian Arrows (loan)	9	(0)
2023–2025	Chennaiyin	31	(0)
2025–	Kerala Blasters	12	(0)

International career^{‡}
2017–2018	India U16	25	(5)
2019–2022	India U19	18	(2)
2024–2025	India U23	8	(0)
- * Club domestic league appearances and goals as of 15:30 22 May 2026 (UTC) ‡ National team caps and goals as of 20:33, 13 October 2025 (UTC)

Bikash Yumnam (Meitei: Yumnam Bikash, born 6 September 2003) is an Indian professional footballer who plays as a defender for Indian Super League club Kerala Blasters.

== Club career ==
Yumnam was included in The Guardian's 2020 edition of their list of 60 footballers for the next generation in October 2020. He made his I-League professional debut for Indian Arrows on 5 February 2020, at Tilak Maidan against NEROCA FC, he started and played full match as they drew 0–0.

On 16 January 2023, Yumnam joined Indian Super League side Chennaiyin on a permanent deal. He made total 38 appearances for the club across two seasons before leaving it in January 2025.

=== Kerala Blasters ===
On 19 January 2025, Kerala Blasters announced the signing of Yumnam from on a long-term deal, which would keep him at the club until 2029. He made his debut for the club on 22 February 2025 in 2–0 loss against FC Goa by coming as a substitute in the 76th minute. In February 2026, in the absence of club captain Adrian Luna, Yumnam was appointed as the stand-in-captain of the club, thus becoming one of the youngest captains in ISL.

== International career ==
Bikash was part of the Indian U-16 team that reached the quarterfinals of the 2018 AFC U-16 Championship in Malaysia. They were eliminated in the quarterfinals by South Korea.

== Career statistics ==
=== Club ===
As of 13 May 2022

Club	Season	League			Cup		AFC		Total	
Club	Season	Division	Apps	Goals	Apps	Goals	Apps	Goals	Apps	Goals
RoundGlass Punjab	2019–20	I-League	0	0	0	0	–		0	0
RoundGlass Punjab	2020–21	I-League	9	0	0	0	–		9	0
RoundGlass Punjab	2021–22	I-League	11	1	0	0	–		11	1
RoundGlass Punjab	RoundGlass Punjab total		20	1	0	0	0	0	20	1
Indian Arrows (loan)	2019–20	I-League	9	0	0	0	–		9	0
Chennaiyin	2022–23	Indian Super League	0	0	0	0	–		0	0
Kerala Blasters	2024–25	Indian Super League	3	0	0	0	–		3	0
Kerala Blasters	2025–26	Indian Super League	9	0	0	0	–		9	0
Kerala Blasters	Total		12	0	0	0	–		12	0
Career total			41	1	0	0	0	0	41	1

== Honours ==
India youth

- SAFF U-15 Championship: 2017
- SAFF U-20 Championship: 2022
