= Marlon Roos-Trujillo =

German footballer

Personal information
- Date of birth: 16 August 2003 (age 23)
- Place of birth: Frankfurt, Germany
- Height: 1.80 m (5 ft 11 in)
- Position: Attacking midfielder

Team information
- Current team: FC Posavina Frankfurt

Youth career
- –2013: Eintracht Frankfurt
- 2013–2020: Mainz 05

Senior career*
Years	Team	Apps	(Gls)
2022–2023	Mainz 05 II	11	(1)
2023–2025	Vukovar 1991	59	(2)
2026	Kerala Blasters	6	(0)
2026–	FC Posavina Frankfurt	0	(0)
- * Club domestic league appearances and goals as of 21:30, 22 February 2026 (UTC)

Marlon Roos-Trujillo (born 16 August 2003) is a German professional footballer who plays as a midfielder for the Kreisoberliga Frankfurt club FC Posavina Frankfurt.

== Early life and career ==
Born on 16 August, 2003 in Frankfurt, Roos-Trujillo is of half-Colombian descent.

On 25 January 2026, he was signed by Indian Super League club Kerala Blasters.
