= David Català =

Spanish footballer (born 1980)

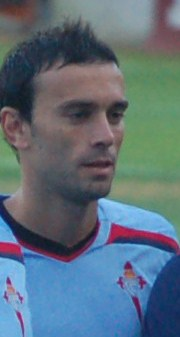
- Català as a Celta player in 2009

Personal information
- Full name: David Català Jiménez
- Date of birth: 3 May 1980 (age 46)
- Place of birth: Barcelona, Spain
- Height: 1.85 m (6 ft 1 in)
- Position: Centre-back

Youth career
- Espanyol

Senior career*
Years	Team	Apps	(Gls)
1999–2003	Espanyol B	114	(5)
2000–2003	Espanyol	7	(0)
2003–2004	Xerez	36	(3)
2004–2005	Lleida	37	(3)
2005–2006	Albacete	16	(0)
2006–2007	Lorca Deportiva	26	(1)
2007–2009	Salamanca	82	(3)
2009–2012	Celta	77	(5)
2012–2019	AEK Larnaca	204	(18)
Total		599	(38)

Managerial career
- 2021–2022: AEK Larnaca
- 2022-2023: Apollon Limassol
- 2023–2024: Istra 1961
- 2024–2025: Sabadell
- 2025–2026: Kerala Blasters
- * Club domestic league appearances and goals

David Català Jiménez (born 3 May 1980) is a Spanish former professional footballer who played as a central defender. He is currently a manager.

After beginning his career at Espanyol, he spent most of it in the Segunda División, representing six teams over nine seasons, mostly Salamanca and Celta. He totalled 274 games and 15 goals in that tier.

Català retired following a seven-year spell at AEK Larnaca in Cyprus, where he began his managerial career.

== Playing career ==
Born in Barcelona, Catalonia, Català began his career at hometown club Espanyol. He made his senior debut on 16 May 1999, playing the entirety of the reserves' 3–0 home win over Palamós in the Segunda División B. He first appeared in La Liga with the first team the following 6 May, as a 43rd-minute substitute for Cristóbal in a 2–0 away loss against Numancia.

After leaving for Xerez of Segunda División in 2003, Català spent each of the next four seasons at a different team in that level, culminating in Lorca Deportiva's relegation in 2007. He stayed for five years in the same league, with Salamanca and Celta de Vigo; he was recommended to the latter by Miguel Torrecilla, the sporting director who made the same move earlier, and was the second player to be acquired that window after Cristian Bustos, agreeing to a three-year deal on 23 June 2009.

Català scored in the Galician derby on 15 April 2012 seven minutes after entering in place of Hugo Mallo, albeit in a 3–2 loss to Deportivo de La Coruña at the Balaídos Stadium. The campaign nonetheless ended in top-flight promotion, with him contributing 18 games and two goals to the feat.

On 28 July 2012, after recently signing a new contract, Català rescinded it and moved abroad for the first time, signing a three-year deal at AEK Larnaca of the Cypriot First Division. He helped the side win the 2017–18 Cypriot Cup at the age of 38, and retired the following year.

== Coaching career ==
Català was appointed manager of his last club in May 2021, replacing Sofronis Avgousti on a two-year contract. He was dismissed on 23 March 2022.

On 12 August 2022, Català continued in the same league by signing a one-year deal with Apollon Limassol. He was sacked three months later.

On 14 August 2023, Català was hired at Istra 1961 of the Croatian Football League, for one season with the option of a further year; he took over from Mislav Karoglan, who had taken one point from three games. He was relieved of his duties the following 7 February, with five wins from 19 matches.

Català was appointed at Sabadell in Spain's Segunda Federación on 10 June 2024, on a one-year contract. He was dismissed on 12 January 2025, after seven games without a win.

On 25 March 2025, Indian Super League club Kerala Blasters announced the appointment of Català on a one-year deal. He made his debut on 20 April, achieving a 2–0 victory over defending champions East Bengal in the Super Cup. He was sacked in March 2026 after only one point in six league matches, becoming the first manager in the competition's history to be shown the door without a win.

== Career statistics ==
As of 4 October 2015

Appearances and goals by club, season and competition
Club	Season	League			Cup		Other		Total	
Club	Season	Division	Apps	Goals	Apps	Goals	Apps	Goals	Apps	Goals
Espanyol	1999–2000	La Liga	1	0	0	0	0	0	1	0
Espanyol	2001–02	La Liga	6	0	0	0	0	0	6	0
Espanyol	Total		7	0	0	0	0	0	7	0
Xerez	2003–04	Segunda División	36	3	2	0	—		38	3
Lleida	2004–05	Segunda División	37	3	2	0	—		39	3
Albacete	2005–06	Segunda División	16	0	2	0	—		18	0
Lorca Deportiva	2006–07	Segunda División	26	1	1	0	—		27	1
Salamanca	2007–08	Segunda División	42	3	1	0	—		43	3
Salamanca	2008–09	Segunda División	40	0	2	0	—		42	0
Salamanca	Salamanca Total		82	3	3	0	—		85	3
Celta	2009–10	Segunda División	22	1	0	0	—		22	1
Celta	2010–11	Segunda División	37	2	1	0	1 (Note: Appearance in La Liga play-offs)	0	39	2
Celta	2011–12	Segunda División	18	2	4	0	—		22	2
Celta	Total		77	5	5	0	1	0	63	5
AEK Larnaca	2012–13	Cypriot First Division	28	1	5	0	—		33	1
AEK Larnaca	2013–14	Cypriot First Division	31	2	3	0	—		33	2
AEK Larnaca	2014–15	Cypriot First Division	30	4	6	1	—		36	5
AEK Larnaca	2015–16	Cypriot First Division	6	0	0	0	2 (Note: Appearances in UEFA Europa League)	0	8	0
AEK Larnaca	Total		95	7	14	1	2	0	111	8
Career total			370	21	27	1	3	0	400	22

== Managerial statistics ==
As of match played 21 March 2026

Managerial record by team and tenure
Team	Nat	From	To	Record								Ref
Team	Nat	From	To	G	W	D	L	GF	GA	GD	Win %	Ref
AEK Larnaca	(Cyprus)	21 May 2021	21 March 2022	29	13	11	5	50	25	+25	44.83	
Apollon Limassol	(Cyprus)	13 August 2022	9 November 2022	18	6	7	5	16	18	−2	33.33	
Istra 1961	(Croatia)	13 August 2023	7 February 2024	19	5	4	10	17	27	−10	26.32	
Sabadell	(Spain)	10 June 2024	12 January 2025	23	9	11	3	31	20	+11	39.13	
Kerala Blasters	(India)	25 March 2025	27 March 2026	9	2	1	6	7	11	−4	22.22	
Total				98	35	34	29	125	93	+32	35.71	—

== Honours ==
=== Player ===
AEK Larnaca

- Cypriot Cup: 2017–18
- Cypriot Super Cup: 2018
