= List of Indian Super League players =

Since the Indian Super League's inaugural season in 2014, 37 players have accrued 100 or more appearances in the Indian Super League. The first player to reach the milestone was defender Mandar Rao Dessai, in representation of Goa and Mumbai City; his 100th match was Mumbai City's 3–0 win over East Bengal on 1 December 2020. Spanish defender Tiri is the first foreign player to make 100 appearances. Sunil Chhetri is the first player to make 100 appearance for a single club with Bengaluru and Edu Bedia is the first foreign player to do so with Goa.

Pritam Kotal is the first player to make 150 appearances in the Indian Super League.

== List of players ==
Players are initially listed by number of appearances. If number of appearances are equal, the players are then listed chronologically by the year of first appearance. Current Indian Super League players and their current clubs are shown in bold.

Statistics are updated as of 29 December 2023.

Indian Super League players with at least 100 appearances
Rank	Player	Nat	Pos	App	First	Last	Club(s)
1	**Pritam Kotal**	(India)	DF	155	2014	2023	Mohun Bagan SG 68, ATK 39, Delhi Dynamos 24, **Kerala Blasters** 12, Pune City 12
2	**Amrinder Singh**	(India)	GK	150	2015	2022	Mumbai City 82, **Odisha** 33, Mohun Bagan SG 22, Atlético de Kolkata 13
3	**Mandar Rao Dessai**	(India)	DF	148	2014	2023	Goa 97, Mumbai City 41, **East Bengal** 10
4	**Lenny Rodrigues**	(India)	MF	147	2014	2023	Goa 53, Mohun Bagan SG 37, Pune City 29, Bengaluru 17, **Odisha** 11
5	**Sunil Chhetri**	(India)	FW	145	2015	2023	**Bengaluru** 128, Mumbai City 17
6	**Sandesh Jhingan**	(India)	DF	139	2014	2023	Kerala Blasters 76, Mohun Bagan SG 31, Bengaluru 22, **Goa** 10
7	**Rahul Bheke**	(India)	DF	137	2015	2023	Bengaluru 70, **Mumbai City** 45, Kerala Blasters 12, Pune City 10
8	**Harmanjot Khabra**	(India)	DF	135	2014	2023	Bengaluru 68, Chennaiyin 34, Kerala Blasters 26, **East Bengal** 7
9	**Narayan Das**	(India)	DF	132	2014	2022	**Goa** 42, Delhi Dynamos 35, Chennaiyin 25, East Bengal 17, Pune City 13
10	**Lallianzuala Chhangte**	(India)	FW	130	2016	2023	Chennaiyin 53, Delhi Dynamos 36, **Mumbai City** 40, NorthEast United 1
11	**Gurpreet Singh Sandhu**	(India)	GK	128	2017	2023	**Bengaluru**
12	**Subhasish Bose**	(India)	DF	127	2017	2023	**Mohun Bagan SG** 75, Mumbai City 34, Bengaluru 18
13	**Jerry Lalrinzuala**	(India)	DF	125	2016	2023	Chennaiyin 94, East Bengal 19, **Odisha** 12
14	**Ahmed Jahouh**	(Morocco)	MF	124	2017	2023	Goa 56, Mumbai City 56, **Odisha** 12
15	**Rehenesh TP**	(India)	GK	123	2014	2023	**Jamshedpur** 61, NorthEast United 49, Kerala Blasters 13
16	**Tiri**	(Spain)	DF	120	2015	2022	Jamshedpur 48, Mohun Bagan SG 38, Atlético de Kolkata 24, **Mumbai City** 10
16	**Seriton Fernandes**	(India)	DF	120	2017	2023	**Goa**
18	**Souvik Chakrabarti**	(India)	MF	119	2014	2022	Delhi Dynamos 35, Hyderabad 26, Mumbai City 25, Jamshedpur 18, **East Bengal** 15
18	**Seiminlen Doungel**	(India)	FW	119	2014	2023	**Jamshedpur** 47, NorthEast United 25, Goa 22, Kerala Blasters 18, Delhi Dynamos 7
18	**Udanta Singh Kumam**	(India)	FW	119	2016	2023	Bengaluru 108, **Goa** 10, Mumbai City 1
21	**Manvir Singh**	(India)	FW	118	2017	2023	**Mohun Bagan SG** 71, Goa 47
22	**Prabir Das**	(India)	DF	113	2014	2023	ATK 46, Mohun Bagan SG 39, Bengaluru 20, **Kerala Blasters** 7, Goa 1
22	Reagan Singh	(India)	DF	113	2015	2023	NorthEast United 69, Chennaiyin 36, Hyderabad 8
22	**Jerry Mawihmingthanga**	(India)	FW	113	2016	2023	**Odisha** 84, Jamshedpur 28, NorthEast United 1
25	**Anirudh Thapa**	(India)	MF	112	2016	2023	Chennaiyin 103, **Mohun Bagan SG** 9
26	**Halicharan Narzary**	(India)	MF	111	2014	2023	Hyderabad 44, NorthEast United 28, Kerala Blasters 26, **Bengaluru** 8, Goa 3, Chennaiyin 2
26	**Jayesh Rane**	(India)	MF	111	2014	2023	ATK 49, Chennaiyin 20,Bengaluru 18, Mohun Bagan SG 16, **Mumbai City** 8
28	**Rowllin Borges**	(India)	MF	110	2016	2023	Mumbai City 55, NorthEast United 48, **Goa** 7
29	**Mourtada Fall**	(Senegal)	DF	107	2018	2023	Mumbai City 59, Goa 40, **Odisha** 8
29	**Bipin Singh**	(India)	FW	107	2017	2023	**Mumbai City** 95, ATK 12
31	Edu Bedia	(Spain)	MF	105	2017	2023	Goa
31	**Pratik Chaudhari**	(India)	DF	105	2016	2023	**Jamshedpur** 37, Bengaluru 32, Mumbai City 17, Delhi Dynamos 11, Kerala Blasters 8
33	**Vishal Kaith**	(India)	GK	104	2017	2023	Chennaiyin 49, **Mohun Bagan SG** 34, Pune City 21
34	**Hugo Boumous**	(France)	DF	103	2018	2023	**Mohun Bagan SG** 45, Goa 42, Mumbai City 16
35	Arindam Bhattacharya	(India)	GK	100	2014	2023	ATK 38, Mohun Bagan SG 23, Pune City 16, East Bengal 11, NorthEast United 10, Mumbai City 2
35	Eli Sabiá	(Brazil)	DF	100	2016	2023	Chennaiyin 67, Jamshedpur 33
35	**Raynier Fernandes**	(India)	MF	100	2018	2023	Mumbai City 70, Odisha 20, **Goa** 10

== Most appearances by club ==
Current Indian Super League clubs and players who hold the record for the club are shown in bold.

As of matches played on 29 December 2023.

Rank	Club	Player	Nat	Apps	First	Last
1	**Bengaluru**	**Sunil Chhetri** **Gurpreet Singh Sandhu**	(India)	128	2017	2023
2	**Goa**	**Seriton Fernandes**	(India)	120	2017	2023
3	**Chennaiyin**	Anirudh Thapa	(India)	103	2016	2023
4	**Mumbai City**	**Bipin Singh Thounaojam**	(India)	95	2018	2023
5	**Kerala Blasters**	Sahal Abdul Samad	(India)	92	2017	2023
6	**Odisha**	**Jerry Mawihmingthanga**	(India)	84	2019	2023
7	**Hyderabad**	**Mohammad Yasir**	(India)	80	2019	2023
8	**Mohun Bagan SG**	Subashish Bose	(India)	75	2020	2023
9	**NorthEast United**	Reagan Singh	(India)	69	2016	2020
10	**Jamshedpur**	**Ricky Lallawmawma**	(India)	67	2020	2023
11	ATK	Jayesh Rane	(India)	49	2017	2020
12	**East Bengal**	**Naorem Mahesh Singh**	(India)	47	2021	2023
13	Pune City	Jonatan Lucca	(Brazil)	35	2016	2018
14	**Punjab**	**Luka Majcen** **Madih Talal**	(Slovenia) (France)	22	2023	2024

== See also ==
- List of Indian Super League records and statistics
