= 2024–25 Mumbai City FC season =

Mumbai City FC
2024–25 season
- Director of Football: Sujay Sharma
- Head coach: (Czech Republic) Petr Kratky
- Stadium: Mumbai Football Arena
- Indian Super League: 6th
- Indian Super Cup: Semi-finals
- Durand Cup: Group Stage
- Top goalscorer: League: Nikos Karelis (10); All: Nikos Karelis (10)
- Average home league attendance: 3,725
- Biggest win: 3–0 vs Mohammedan SC, Indian Super League
- Biggest defeat: 8–0 vs Kerala Blasters, Durand Cup
Home colours	Away colours

The 2024–25 season was the eleventh season in Mumbai City FC's existence, where the club competed in the Indian Super League, Durand Cup, and Super Cup.

== Players ==
=== First-team squad ===
As of 25 January 2025

Note: Flags indicate national team as defined under FIFA eligibility rules; some limited exceptions apply. Players may hold more than one non-FIFA nationality.

No.	Pos.	Nation	Player
1	GK	IND	Phurba Lachenpa
3	DF	IND	Valpuia
4	DF	ESP	Tiri
5	DF	IND	Mehtab Singh
6	FW	IND	Vikram Partap Singh
7	FW	IND	Lallianzuala Chhangte (captain)
8	MF	NED	Yoell van Nieff
9	FW	GRE	Nikolaos Karelis
10	MF	IND	Brandon Fernandes
11	FW	ESP	Jorge Ortiz
13	DF	SYR	Thaer Krouma
14	MF	FRA	Jérémy Manzorro
15	DF	IND	Sanjeev Stalin
16	MF	IND	Franklin Nazareth
17	MF	IND	Supratim Das

No.	Pos.	Nation	Player
18	MF	IND	Hitesh Sharma (on loan from Odisha)
19	FW	IND	Daniel Lalhlimpuia
20	MF	IND	Jayesh Rane
21	MF	ESP	Jon Toral
22	DF	IND	Halen Nongtdu
23	GK	IND	Rehenesh TP
27	DF	IND	Nathan Rodrigues
28	FW	IND	Ayush Chhikara
29	FW	IND	Bipin Singh
31	DF	IND	Akash Mishra
32	GK	IND	Ahan Prakash
33	DF	IND	Prabir Das (on loan from Kerala Blasters)
36	DF	IND	Sahil Panwar
71	MF	IND	Ishaan Shishodia
77	MF	IND	Gyamar Nikum
92	FW	IND	Noufal PN

== Transfers ==
=== In ===
==== Transfers in ====
Date of arrival	Position	Player	Previous club	Transfer fee	Ref
1 June 2024	MF	(India) Brandon Fernandes	(India) Goa	Free Transfer	
15 June 2024	MF	(India) Noufal PN	(India) Gokulam Kerala	Free Transfer	
18 June 2024	GK	(India) Rehenesh TP	(India) Jamshedpur	Free Transfer	
20 June 2024	MF	(India) Jayesh Rane	(India) Bengaluru	Free Transfer	
25 June 2024	MF	(France) Jeremy Manzorro	(India) Jamshedpur	Free Transfer	
2 July 2024	MF	(Spain) Jon Toral	(Greece) OFI	Free Transfer	
8 July 2024	FW	(India) Daniel Lalhlimpuia	(India) Punjab	Free Transfer	
11 July 2024	FW	(Greece) Nikos Karelis	(Greece) Panetolikos	Free Transfer	
15 July 2024	DF	(India) Sahil Panwar	(India) Odisha	Free Transfer	
17 July 2024	DF	(India) Hardik Bhatt	(India) Rajasthan United	Free Transfer	
23 January 2025	FW	(Spain) Jorge Ortiz	(China) Shenzhen Peng	Free Transfer	
29 January 2025	GK	(India) Vishal Joon	(India) Calicut FC	Free Transfer	

==== Loans in ====
Start Date	End Date	Position	Player	From club	Ref
13 July 2024	End of Season	MF	(India) Hitesh Sharma	(India) Odisha	
2 January 2025	End of Season	DF	(India) Prabir Das	(India) Kerala Blasters	

=== Out ===
==== Transfers Out ====
Date of departure	Position	Player	Outgoing club	Transfer Fee	Ref
25 May 2024	GK	(India) Bhaskar Roy	(India) Mohammedan	Free Transfer	
25 May 2024	FW	(India) Gurkirat Singh	(India) Chennaiyin	Free Transfer	
25 May 2024	FW	(Spain) Iker Guarrotxena	(India) Goa	Free Transfer	
25 May 2024	FW	(Slovakia) Jakub Vojtus	(Romania) Unirea Slobozia	Free Transfer	
25 May 2024	GK	(India) Mohammad Nawaz	(India) Chennaiyin	Free Transfer	
25 May 2024	DF	(India) Naocha Singh	(India) Kerala Blasters	Free Transfer	
25 May 2024	MF	(India) Rowllin Borges	(India) Goa	Free Transfer	
25 May 2024	MF	(India) Tondomba Singh	(India) Delhi FC	Free Transfer	
27 May 2024	MF	(Spain) Alberto Noguera	(India) Bengaluru	Free Transfer	
28 May 2024	MF	(India) Vinit Rai	(India) Punjab	Free Transfer	
29 May 2024	FW	(Argentina) Jorge Pereyra Diaz	(India) Bengaluru	Free Transfer	
31 May 2024	DF	(India) Rahul Bheke	(India) Bengaluru	Free Transfer	
24 June 2024	MF	(India) Apuia	(India) Mohun Bagan SG	Rs. 1.6 crore	

==== Loans Out ====
Start Date	End Date	Position	Player	To club	Ref
8 July 2024	End Of Season	DF	(India) Amey Ranawade	(India) Odisha	
25 July 2024	End Of Season	MF	(India) Seilenthang Lotjem	(India) Sreenidi Deccan	
15 January 2025	End Of Season	DF	(India) Hardik Bhatt	(India) Sreenidi Deccan	
31 January 2025	End Of Season	DF	(India) Halen Nongtdu	(India) Gokulam Kerala	

== Personnel ==
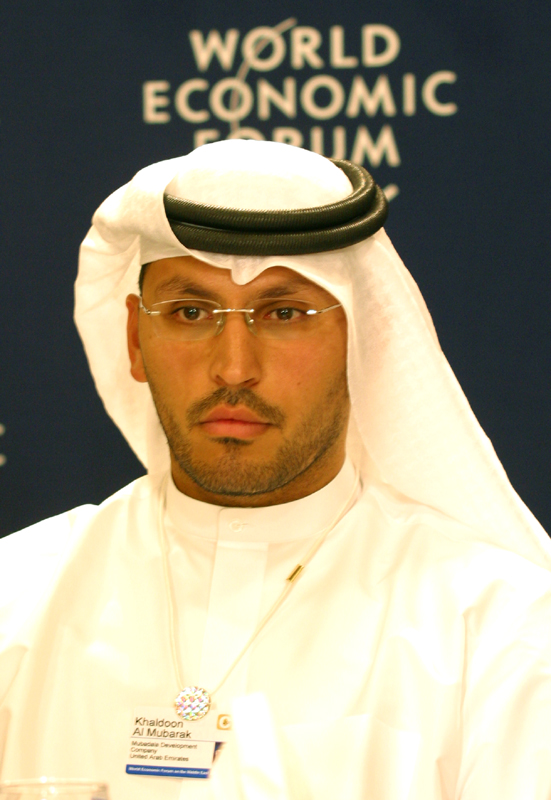
Chairman Khaldoon Al Mubarak

=== Corporate ===
Position	Name
Owner(s)	(England) City Football Group (65%) (India) Ranbir Kapoor (18%) (India) Bimal Parekh (17%)
Chairman	(United Arab Emirates) Khaldoon Al Mubarak
Board of directors	(India) Ranbir Kapoor (India) Bimal Parekh
CEO	(India) Kandarp Chandra
Senior executive(s)
Senior executive(s)	(India) Tanay Narvekar
Team manager	(India) Rocky Kalan
Marketing manager	(India) Siddharth Yadav
Assistant marketing manager	(India) Dwaipayan Ghosh
Sponsorship & sales	(India) Ganeshaya Sodha
Senior finance manager	(India) Pankti Mehta
Finance controller	(India) Ankit Agrawal

=== Technical ===
Position	Name
Head coach	(Czech Republic) Petr Kratky
Assistant coach	(Portugal) Mário Lemos
Assistant coach	(India) Clifford Miranda
Director of football	(India) Sujay Sharma
Team manager	(India) Rocky Kalan
Goalkeeping coach	(England) David Preece
Strength & conditioning coach	(Czech Republic) Denis Kavan
Strength & conditioning coach	(India) Adrian Dias
Performance analyst	(India) Narendra Vakare
Performance analyst	(India) Trishit Ghosh
Physiotherapist	(India) Suhas Kandekar
Physiotherapist	(India) Akhilesh
Team doctor	(India) Simarpreet Singh Kalra
Head of rehabilitation and sports medicine	(India) Sandeep Kurale
Team photographer	(India) Abhinav Ashish Aind
Media manager	(India) Annujj Palaye
Kit manager	(India) Rishi Roy
Head of youth and grassroots development	(India) Dinesh Nair

== Summary ==
=== Durand Cup ===
Mumbai City officially began the 2024–25 season with the 2024 Durand Cup, where the club were placed in Group C, alongside Kerala Blasters, CISF Protectors, and Punjab FC. However, with the club choosing to conduct the squad's pre-season training abroad in Thailand, the senior team skipped the competition. The Mumbai City reserve team ended up competing for the club in the competition.

In the competition, the Mumbai reserve team lost all three of their games, and were knocked out in the group stage.

== Competitions ==
=== Durand Cup ===
==== Group C ====
Pos	Team	Pld	W	D	L	GF	GA	GD	Pts	Qualification	KER	PUN	CIS	MCI
1	Kerala Blasters	3	2	1	0	16	1	+15	7	Advanced to knockout stage		1–1	7–0	
2	Punjab	3	2	1	0	7	1	+6	7	Advanced to knockout stage				3–0
3	CISF Protectors	3	1	0	2	2	10	−8	3			0–3		
4	Mumbai City	3	0	0	3	0	13	−13	0		0–8		0–2	

Source: Twitter
Rules for classification: Group stage tiebreakers

=== Indian Super League ===
==== League table ====
Pos	Team	Pld	W	D	L	GF	GA	GD	Pts	Qualification
4	NorthEast United	24	10	8	6	46	29	+17	38 (Note: Head-to-head points: Bengaluru 7, NorthEast 7, Jamshedpur 3; Head-to-head goal difference: Bengaluru +2, NorthEast -2.)	Qualification for the knockouts
5	Jamshedpur	24	12	2	10	37	43	−6	38	Qualification for the knockouts
6	Mumbai City	24	9	9	6	29	28	+1	36	Qualification for the knockouts
7	Odisha	24	8	9	7	44	37	+7	33	
8	Kerala Blasters	24	8	5	11	33	37	−4	29	

Source: ISL
Rules for classification: 1) points; 2) goal difference; 3) number of goals scored; 4) head-to-head points; 5) head-to-head goal difference; 6) head-to-head goals scored; 7) fair play ranking; 8) drawing of lots
(Note: Head-to-head record is used only after all the matches between the teams in question have been played).

=== Super Cup ===
Round of 16
20 April
8	Kerala Blasters	2
9	East Bengal	0
21 April
2	Goa	3
IL4	Gokulam Kerala	0
21 April
7	Odisha	0
10	Punjab	3
23 April
3	Bengaluru	1 (3)
IL2	Inter Kashi (p)	1 (5)
23 April
6	Mumbai City	4
11	Chennaiyin	0
24 April
4	Northeast United	6
13	Mohammedan	0
24 April
5	Jamshedpur	2
12	Hyderabad	0

Quarter-finals
26 April
8	Kerala Blasters	1
1	Mohun Bagan	2
26 April
2	Goa	2
10	Punjab	1
27 April
IL2	Inter Kashi	0
6	Mumbai City	1
27 April
4	Northeast United	0 (4)
5	Jamshedpur (p)	0 (5)

Semi-finals
30 April
1	Mohun Bagan	1
2	Goa	3
30 April
6	Mumbai City	0
5	Jamshedpur	1

Final
3 May
2	Goa	3
5	Jamshedpur	0
