= 2023–24 Mumbai City FC season =

10th season in existence of Mumbai City FC

Mumbai City FC
2023–24 season
- Owner: City Football Group (65%); Ranbir Kapoor (18%); Bimal Parekh (17%)
- Chairman: Khaldoon Al Mubarak
- Manager: Petr Kratky
- Stadium: Mumbai Football Arena; Shree Shiv Chhatrapati Sports Complex (for ACL matches)
- Indian Super League: 2nd
- Durand Cup: Quarter-finals
- Super Cup: semi-finals
- ISL Playoffs: Champions
- AFC Champions League: Group Stages
- Average home league attendance: 4,203
Home colours	Away colours

The 2023–24 season was the 10th season in the history of Mumbai City Football Club and the club's 7th consecutive season in the top flight of Indian football. In addition to the domestic league, Mumbai City will compete in this season's editions of the Durand Cup, Super Cup and AFC Champions League. The season covers the period from 1 August 2023 to 31 May 2024.

== Pre-season overview ==
=== May ===
On 17 May, the Islanders announced that they have extended the contract of the Australian centre-back Rostyn Griffiths till the end of the 2023–24 season.

On 18 May, the Islanders announced that they have been granted ICLS Premier 1 license by the All India Football Federation — the governing body of association football in India.

On 23 May, the Islanders announced the contract extension of Spanish central midfielder Alberto Noguera till the end of the 2023–24 season.

On 26 May, the Islanders announced the contract extension of Argentine striker Jorge Pereyra Díaz till the end of the 2023–24 season.

On 28 May, the Islanders announced the departure of their Indian left-back Mandar Rao Dessai after spending three years at the club.

On 29 May, the Islanders announced the departure of their club captain, Senegalese centre-back Mourtada Fall after three years with the club.

On 30 May, the Islanders announced the departure of their Moroccan defensive midfielder Ahmed Jahouh after spending three years at the club.

On 31 May, the Islanders announced the departures of Hardik Bhatt (on loan), Gursimrat Singh Gill and Raynier Fernandes from the club as their contracts ended on the same day.

=== June ===
On 1 June, the Islanders welcomed back Spaniard Juanma Cruz as their new first-team goalkeeping coach till the end of the 2023–24 season.

On 3 June, the Islanders announced the contract extension of Indian right-back Rahul Bheke till the end of the 2023–24 season.

On 7 June, the Islanders announced the contract extension of Indian right winger Vikram Partap Singh till 2026 on a three-year contract.

On 11 June, the Islanders announced that Rowllin Borges has been loaned out to FC Goa till the end of the 2023–24 season.

On 12 June, the Islanders announced the contract extension of Indian centre-back Mehtab Singh till 2026 on a three-year contract.

On 16 June, the Islanders announced the contract extension of Indian striker Ayush Chhikara till 2026 on a three-year contract.

On 18 June, the Islanders announced the departure of Naorem Tondomba Singh to Delhi FC on a season-long loan deal.

On 19 June, the Islanders announced the signing of Indian left-back Akash Mishra from Hyderabad FC for an undisclosed transfer fee till 2028 on a five-year deal.

On 24 June, the Islanders announced the permanent signing of Vinit Rai from Odisha FC following his loan spell till the end of the 2023–24 season.

On 27 June, the Islanders announced that Amey Ranawade has been loaned out to Odisha FC till the end of the 2023–24 season.

On 28 June, the Islanders announced the contract extension of Indian goalkeeper Phurba Lachenpa till 2026 on a three-year contract.

=== July ===
On 6 July, the Islanders announced the signing of the Spanish centre-back Tiri till the end of the 2023–24 season.

On 8 July, the Islanders announced the signings of centre-back Nathan Rodrigues and midfielder Franklin Nazareth from RFYC. The two 19 year-olds joined Mumbai City till 2027 on a four-year deal.

On 10 July, the Islanders announced the departure Indian left-back Vignesh Dakshinamurthy to Hyderabad FC for an undisclosed fee after spending five years at the club.

On 12 July, the Islanders announced the signing of Dutch defensive midfielder Yoell van Nieff until 2025.

On 13 July, the Islanders announced the departure of left-back Naocha Singh to Kerala Blasters on a season-long loan deal.

On 14 July, Mumbai City unveiled the club's new crest ahead of the 2023–24 season, a landmark 10th season of the club's history. The new Puma 2023–24 home kit was also revealed – the first kit in the Islanders new era to feature the new crest.

On 16 July, the Islanders announced that they would travel to Thailand on a pre-season tour in preparation for the Durand Cup campaign in August.

On 17 July, the Islanders were drawn in Group B for the 132nd edition of the Durand Cup, alongside Indian Navy, Jamshedpur FC and Mohammedan SC.

On 22 July, the Islanders announced the signing of Indian attacking midfielder Jayesh Rane on a season-long loan from Bengaluru FC.

On 23 July, the Durand Cup announced the fixtures of the Islanders and the participating clubs.

On 30 July, the Islanders played their first tour pre-season friendly match against Thai League 1 side PT Prachuap, which they won 3–0.

== Season Overview ==
=== August ===
On 4 August, the Islanders announced a 29-member squad for the 2023 Durand Cup.

On 5 August, the Islanders played their first group stage match in the Durand Cup against I-League side Mohammedan SC, which ended in a 1–3 win.

On 8 August, the Islanders played their second group stage match in the Durand Cup against Jamshedpur FC, which they won 0–5.

On 14 August, the Islanders announced the departure of striker Mustafa Shaikh to Sporting Club Bengaluru on a season-long loan deal.

On 14 August, the Islanders announced the departure of Indian midfielder, Mohammed Asif Khan, to Inter Kashi for an undisclosed fee after spending five years at the club from the age of 14.

On 19 August, the Islanders played their third group stage match in the Durand Cup against Indian Navy FT, which they won 4–0, making it three wins out of three in Group B and qualifying for the quarter-finals.

On 22 August, the Islanders were drawn against Mohun Bagan SG in the quarter-finals of the Durand Cup. The match is scheduled to play on 27 August.

On 22 August, the Islanders announced that they will be playing their home games in the AFC Champions League at the Shree Shiv Chhatrapati Sports Complex in Pune, due to the present infrastructural setup at the Mumbai Football Arena which makes the venue ineligible to host games.

== First team ==
=== First-team coaching staff ===
Position	Name	Nationality	Year appointed	Last club/team	References
Manager	Petr Kratky	Czech Republic	2023	(Australia) Melbourne City (as assistant coach)	
Assistant Coaches	Hiroshi Miyazawa	Japan	2021	(New Zealand) Auckland United	
Assistant Coaches	Anthony Fernandes	India	2018		
Goalkeeping Coach	Juanma Cruz	Spain	2023	(China) Sichuan Jiuniu (as goalkeeping coach)	

=== First-team squad ===
Notes:

- Players and squad numbers last updated on 8 September 2023.
- Appearances and goals last updated on 19 August 2023, including all competitions for senior teams.
- Flags indicate national team as defined under FIFA eligibility rules. Players may hold more than one non-FIFA nationality.
- Player^{*} – Player who joined the club permanently or on loan during the season.
- Player^{†} – Player who departed the club permanently or on loan during the season.

No.	Player	Nat.	Position(s) (Footedness)	Date of birth (age)	Signed		Transfer fee	Apps.	Goals
No.	Player	Nat.	Position(s) (Footedness)	Date of birth (age)	In	From	Transfer fee	Apps.	Goals
Goalkeepers
1	Phurba Lachenpa	IND	GK (R)	4 February 1998 (age 28)	2020	(India) Real Kashmir	Free transfer	43	0
13	Mohammad Nawaz	IND	GK (R)	21 January 2000 (age 26)	2021	(India) Goa	Free transfer	21	0
22	Bhaskar Roy	IND	GK (R)	5 January 1994 (age 32)	2022	(India) Rajasthan United	Free transfer	0	0
32	Ahan Prakash	IND	GK (R)	20 August 2004 (age 21)	2023	(India) Indian Arrows	Free transfer	0	0
Defenders
2	Rahul Bheke (captain)	IND	RB / CB (R)	6 December 1990 (age 35)	2021	(India) Bengaluru	Free transfer	50	3
3	Valpuia	IND	CB / LB (L)	31 May 2000 (age 26)	2019	(India) Aizawl	Free transfer	6	0
4	Tiri^{*}	ESP	CB (L)	14 July 1991 (age 34)	2023	(India) Mohun Bagan SG	Free transfer	0	0
5	Mehtab Singh	IND	CB (R)	5 June 1998 (age 27)	2020	(India) East Bengal	Free transfer	64	5
17	Sanjeev Stalin	IND	LB (L)	17 January 2001 (age 25)	2022	(India) Kerala Blasters	Free transfer	20	0
18	Rostyn Griffiths	AUS	CB (R)	10 March 1988 (age 38)	2022	(Australia) Melbourne City	Free transfer	25	2
27	Nathan Rodrigues^{*}	IND	CB (L)	2 February 2004 (age 22)	2023	(India) RFYC	Free transfer	1	1
31	Akash Mishra^{*}	IND	LB (L)	27 November 2001 (age 24)	2023	(India) Hyderabad	Undisclosed	1	0
44	Halen Nongtdu	IND	CB (R)	2 February 2004 (age 22)	2022	(India) Indian Arrows	Free transfer	3	0
Midfielders
8	Yoell van Nieff^{*}	NED	DM / CB (L)	17 June 1993 (age 32)	2023	(Hungary) Puskas AFC	Free transfer	3	1
10	Alberto Noguera	ESP	AM / CM (R)	24 September 1989 (age 36)	2022	(India) Goa	Free transfer	31	6
16	Vinit Rai^{*}	IND	DM / CM / LB (R)	10 October 1997 (age 28)	2022	(India) Odisha	Free transfer	35	2
20	Jayesh Rane^{*}	IND	CM / AM (R)	20 February 1993 (age 33)	2023	(India) Bengaluru	Loan transfer	0	0
45	Lalengmawia Ralte (Apuia)	IND	CM / DM (R)	17 October 2000 (age 25)	2021	(India) NorthEast United	₹20m	53	5
60	Franklin Nazareth^{*}	IND	DM (R)	3 January 2004 (age 22)	2023	(India) RFYC	Free transfer	1	0
77	Gyamar Nikum	IND	RM / CM (R/L)	26 October 2004 (age 21)	2023	(India) Rajasthan United	₹6m	1	0
Attackers
6	Vikram Pratap Singh	IND	RW (R)	16 January 2002 (age 24)	2020	(India) Indian Arrows	₹5m	63	9
7	Lallianzuala Chhangte	IND	RW (L)	8 June 1997 (age 28)	2022	(India) Chennaiyin	Free transfer	48	19
11	Gurkirat Singh	IND	ST / LW (L)	16 July 2003 (age 22)	2021	(India) Indian Arrows	Free transfer	30	1
21	Seilenthang Lotjem^{*}	IND	LW (R)	12 April 2004 (age 22)	2023	(India) Sudeva Delhi	Free transfer	0	0
23	Nasser El Khayati^{*}	NED	LW (R)	7 February 1989 (age 37)	2023	(India) Chennaiyin	Free transfer	0	0
24	Greg Stewart	SCO	CF / AM (L)	17 March 1990 (age 36)	2022	(India) Jamshedpur	Free transfer	31	15
28	Ayush Chhikara	IND	ST (R)	28 July 2002 (age 23)	2022	(India) Mumbai City Academy	N/A	10	1
29	Bipin Singh	IND	LW (R)	10 March 1995 (age 31)	2018	(India) ATK	Free transfer	107	22
30	Jorge Pereyra Díaz	ARG	ST (R)	5 August 1990 (age 35)	2022	(Argentina) Platense	Free transfer	28	16
Out on loan
4	Amey Ranawade^{†}	IND	RB (R)	7 March 1998 (age 28)	2020	(India) Bengaluru United	Free transfer	40	0
14	Rowllin Borges^{†}	IND	DM / CM (R)	5 June 1992 (age 33)	2019	(India) NorthEast United	Free transfer	60	4
18	Naocha Singh^{†}	IND	LB / CB (L)	24 August 1999 (age 26)	2021	(India) Gokulam Kerala	Free transfer	0	0
28	Naorem Tondomba Singh^{†}	IND	DM / CM (R)	1 February 1999 (age 27)	2020	(India) East Bengal	Free transfer	0	0

==== Squad number changes ====
Notes:

- Players and squad numbers last updated on 31 August 2023.
- The list is sorted by new squad number.
- Player^{*} – Player who joined Mumbai City permanently or on loan during the season.
- Player^{†} – Player who departed Mumbai City permanently or on loan during the season.

Player	Pos.	Prev. No.	New No.	Previous player to wear number	Notes
(India) Valpuia	DF	31	3	(India) Tondonba Singh^{†}	Mishra took the number 31 shirt
(Spain) Tiri^{*}	DF	—	4	(India) Amey Ranawade^{†}	Ranawade departed the club on loan
(Netherlands) Yoell van Nieff^{*}	MF	—	8	(Spain) Alberto Noguera	Noguera took the number 10 shirt
(Spain) Alberto Noguera	MF	8	10	(Morocco) Ahmed Jahouh^{†}	Jahouh departed the club
(India) Gurkirat Singh	FW	9	11	(India) Raynier Fernandes^{†}	Fernandes departed the club
(India) Sanjeev Stalin	DF	15	17	(India) Mandar Rao Dessai^{†}	Dessai departed the club
(India) Jayesh Rane^{*}	MF	—	20	(India) Jackichand Singh^{†}	—
(India) Nathan Rodrigues^{*}	DF	—	27	(India) Farukh Choudhary^{†}	—
(India) Akash Mishra^{*}	DF	—	31	(India) Valpuia	Valpuia took the number 3 shirt
(India) Franklin Nazareth^{*}	MF	—	60	—	—
(India) Seilenthang Lotjem^{*}	FW	—	21	(India) Ravi Kumar^{†}	—

== New contracts and transfers ==
=== New contracts ===
Date	No.	Pos.	Nat.	Player	Ref.
17 May 2023	18	DF	(Australia)	Rostyn Griffiths	
23 May 2023	10	MF	(Spain)	Alberto Noguera	
26 May 2023	30	FW	(Argentina)	Jorge Pereyra Díaz	
3 June 2023	2	DF	(India)	Rahul Bheke	
7 June 2023	6	FW	(India)	Vikram Pratap Singh	
12 June 2023	5	DF	(India)	Mehtab Singh	
16 June 2023	28	FW	(India)	Ayush Chhikara	
28 June 2023	1	GK	(India)	Phurba Lachenpa	

=== Transfers in ===
Date	No.	Pos.	Nat.	Player	Transferred from	Fee	Ref.
19 June 2023	31	DF	(India)	Akash Mishra	(India) Hyderabad (Indian Super League)	Undisclosed	
24 June 2023	16	MF	(India)	Vinit Rai	(India) Odisha (Indian Super League)	Free transfer	
6 July 2023	4	DF	(Spain)	Tiri	(India) Mohun Bagan SG (Indian Super League)	Free transfer	
8 July 2023	27	DF	(India)	Nathan Rodrigues	(India) RFYC (Youth leagues)	Free transfer	
8 July 2023	60	MF	(India)	Franklin Nazareth	(India) RFYC (Youth leagues)	Free transfer	
12 July 2023	8	MF	(Netherlands)	Yoell van Nieff	(Hungary) Puskas AFC (NB I)	Free transfer	
22 July 2023	20	MF	(India)	Jayesh Rane	(India) Bengaluru (Indian Super League)	Loan transfer	
31 August 2023	21	FW	(India)	Seilenthang Lotjem	(India) Sudeva Delhi (I-League)	Free transfer	
8 September 2023		FW	(Netherlands)	Nasser El Khayati	(India) Chennaiyin (Indian Super League)	Free transfer	

=== Transfers out ===
Date	No.	Pos.	Nat.	Player	Transferred to	Fee	Ref.
28 May 2023	17	DF	(India)	Mandar Rao Dessai	(India) East Bengal (Indian Super League)	Free transfer	
29 May 2023	25	DF	(Senegal)	Mourtada Fall	(India) Odisha (Indian Super League)	Free transfer	
30 May 2023	10	MF	(Morocco)	Ahmed Jahouh	(India) Odisha (Indian Super League)	Free transfer	
31 May 2023	93	DF	(India)	Hardik Bhatt	(India) Rajasthan United (I-League)	End of loan	
31 May 2023	33	DF	(India)	Gursimrat Singh Gill	(India) East Bengal (Indian Super League)	Free transfer	
31 May 2023	11	MF	(India)	Raynier Fernandes	(India) Goa (Indian Super League)	Free transfer	
10 July 2023	23	DF	(India)	Vignesh Dakshinamurthy	(India) Hyderabad (Indian Super League)	Undisclosed	
14 August 2023	36	MF	(India)	Mohammed Asif Khan	(India) Inter Kashi (I-League)	Undisclosed	

=== Loans out ===
Date	No.	Pos.	Nat.	Player	Loaned to	On loan until	Ref.
11 June 2023	14	MF	(India)	Rowllin Borges	(India) Goa (Indian Super League)	31 May 2024	
18 June 2023	28	MF	(India)	Naorem Tondomba Singh	(India) Delhi (I-League)	31 May 2024	
27 June 2023	4	DF	(India)	Amey Ranawade	(India) Odisha (Indian Super League)	31 May 2024	
13 July 2023	18	DF	(India)	Naocha Singh	(India) Kerala Blasters (Indian Super League)	31 May 2024	
14 August 2023	26	FW	(India)	Mustafa Shaikh	(India) SC Bengaluru (Regional League)	31 May 2024	

== Kits ==
Supplier: Puma / Sponsor: Stake News

Home

This is Puma's fourth year supplying Mumbai City kit, having taken over from Sqad Gear at the beginning of the 2020–21 season.

== Pre-season friendlies ==
On 16 July 2023, Mumbai City announced that they would travel to Thailand on a pre-season tour in preparation for the Durand Cup campaign in August. The team will set up their base in Alpine Football Camp, Bangkok, from 15 July to 1 August. On 30 July, the first tour friendly was confirmed against Thai League 1 side PT Prachuap.

=== Friendlies ===
Win Draw Loss Fixtures

30 July 2023 Friendly	Mumbai City (India)	3–0	(Thailand) PT Prachuap	Bangkok, Thailand
18:00 ICT; 16:30 IST	Díaz 25'; B. Singh 26'; Rai 48'	Report

== Competitions ==
=== Overall record ===
Competition	First match	Last match	Starting round	Final position	Record							
Competition	First match	Last match	Starting round	Final position	Pld	W	D	L	GF	GA	GD	Win %
Indian Super League	24 September 2023	TBD	Matchday 1	TBD	8	4	4	0	13	6	+7	50.00
Durand Cup	5 August 2023	27 August 2023	Group stage	Quarter Final	4	3	0	1	13	4	+9	75.00
Super Cup	11 January 2024	TBD	Group stage	TBD	3	3	0	0	6	3	+3	100.00
AFC Champions League	18 September 2023	4 December 2023	Group stage	Group stage	6	0	0	6	1	17	−16	0.00
Total					21	10	4	7	33	30	+3	47.62

Source: Soccerway

=== Indian Super League ===
==== League table ====
Pos	Team	Pld	W	D	L	GF	GA	GD	Pts	Qualification
1	Mohun Bagan (C)	22	15	3	4	47	26	+21	48	Qualification for the Champions League Two group stage and semi-finals
2	Mumbai City (W)	22	14	5	3	42	19	+23	47	Qualification for the semi-finals
3	Goa	22	13	6	3	39	21	+18	45	Qualification for the knockouts
4	Odisha	22	11	6	5	35	23	+12	39	Qualification for the knockouts
5	Kerala Blasters	22	10	3	9	32	31	+1	33	Qualification for the knockouts

Source: Indian Super League
Rules for classification: 1) points; 2) head-to-head points; 3) head-to-head goal difference; 4) head-to-head goals scored; 5) goal difference; 6) number of goals scored; 7) fair play ranking
(C) Champions; (W) ISL Cup winners

==== Results summary ====
Overall								Home						Away					
Pld	W	D	L	GF	GA	GD	Pts	W	D	L	GF	GA	GD	W	D	L	GF	GA	GD
2	1	1	0	4	3	+1	4	0	0	0	0	0	0	1	1	0	4	3	+1

Last updated: pre-season.
Source: Indian Super League

==== League Results by Round ====
Round	1	2	3	4	5	6	7	8	9	10	11	12	13	14	15	16	17	18	19	20	21	22
Ground	A	A	H	H	H	A	A	H	H	A	H											
Result	W	D	W	D	W	W	D	D														
Position	4	4																				

Source: Indian Super League
A = Away; H = Home; W = Win; D = Draw; L = Loss
Notes: Positions show the situation at the end of the corresponding Game Weeks (GW), not the position at the conclusion of matches or game days.

The first eleven league fixtures were announced on 7 September 2023.

Win Draw Loss Fixtures

24 September 2023 1	NorthEast United	1–2	Mumbai City	Guwahati
20:00 IST	Gogoi 32'; Bemammer (yellow card) 40'	Report	Díaz 26', 38'; Mishra (yellow card) 29'; van Nieff (yellow card) 45+3'; Stewart (yellow card) 86'	Stadium: Indira Gandhi Athletic Stadium; Attendance: 7,259

28 September 2023 2	Odisha	2–2	Mumbai City	Bhubaneswar
20:00 IST	Puitea (yellow card) 27'; Delgado (yellow card) 41'; Mawihmingthanga 45+1'; Krishna 76' (pen.)	Report	Griffiths 47'; Díaz 88'; Apuia (yellow card) 90+2'; El Khayati (yellow card) 90+8'	Stadium: Kalinga Stadium; Attendance: 7,150; Referee: Pranjal Banerjee

8 October 2023 3	Mumbai City	2-1	Kerala Blasters	Mumbai
20:00 IST	Díaz 45+4'; Ralte 66'; Nieff (yellow card) 82' (red card) 90+15'; Gurkirat (yellow card) 90+9'; Khayati (yellow card) 90+12'		Jeakson (yellow card) 44'; Luna (yellow card) 45+5'; Danish 57'; Freddy (yellow card) 90+7'; Sandeep (yellow card) 90+9'; Das (yellow card) 90+15'; Drinčić (red card) 90+15'	Stadium: Mumbai Football Arena; Attendance: 6,911; Referee: Pratik Mondal; Man of the Match: Jorge Pereyra Díaz (Mumbai City)

28 October 2023 4	Mumbai City	1-1	Hyderabad	Mumbai
17:30 IST	Manoj Mohammed 76' (OG)		Tiri 90+6' (OG)	Stadium: Mumbai Football Arena

2 November 2023 5	Mumbai City	2-1	Punjab	Mumbai
20:00 IST	Stewart 82'; Díaz 82'		Luka Majcen 38'	Stadium: Mumbai Football Arena

8 December 2023 6	Bengaluru	0-4	Mumbai City	Bengaluru
20:00 IST			El Khayati 11'; Akash Mishra 30'; Díaz 57' (P); Lallianzuala Chhangte 61' (P)	Stadium: Sree Kanteerava Stadium

12 December 2023 7	Goa	0-0	Mumbai City	Margao
20:00 IST				Stadium: Fatorda Stadium

16 December 2023 8	Mumbai City	0-0	East Bengal	Mumbai
20:00 IST				Stadium: Mumbai Football Arena

20 December 2023 9	Mumbai City	v	Mohun Bagan SG	Mumbai
20:00 IST				Stadium: Mumbai Football Arena

24 December 2023 10	Kerala Blasters	v	Mumbai City	Kochi
20:00 IST				Stadium: Jawaharlal Nehru Stadium

28 December 2023 11	Mumbai City	v	Chennaiyin	Mumbai
20:00 IST				Stadium: Mumbai Football Arena

=== Durand Cup ===
==== Group stage ====
Pos	Team	Pld	W	D	L	GF	GA	GD	Pts	Qualification	MCI	MSC	JAM	INV
1	Mumbai City	3	3	0	0	12	1	+11	9	Qualify for the knockout stage	—	—	5–0	4–0
2	Mohammedan (H)	3	2	0	1	9	4	+5	6		1–3	—	6–0	2–1
3	Jamshedpur	3	1	0	2	1	11	−10	3		—	—	—	1–0
4	Indian Navy	3	0	0	3	1	7	−6	0		—	—	—	—

Source: Twitter
Rules for classification: Group stage tiebreakers
(H) Hosts

The fixtures were announced on 22 July 2023. Mumbai City were drawn in Group B for the 132nd edition of the Durand Cup.

Win Draw Loss

5 August 2023 1	Mohammedan	1–3	Mumbai City	Kolkata, West Bengal
16:45 IST	D. Lalhlansanga 42'; Mallick (yellow card) 69'	Report	Griffiths 12'; Díaz 24'; Chhangte 35'	Stadium: Kishore Bharati Krirangan; Attendance: 3,652; Referee: Harish Kundu; Man of the Match: Alberto Noguera (Mumbai City)

8 August 2023 2	Mumbai City	5–0	Jamshedpur	Kolkata, West Bengal
18:00 IST	Díaz 8', 14'; Noguera 40'; van Nieff 47'; V. Singh 55'	Report		Stadium: Vivekananda Yuba Bharati Krirangan; Referee: Pranjal Banerjee; Man of the Match: Lalengmawia Ralte (Mumbai City)

19 August 2023 3	Mumbai City	4–0	Indian Navy	Kolkata, West Bengal
14:30 IST	Díaz 34'; Stewart 62'; G. Singh 74'; van Nieff (yellow card) 85'; N. Rodrigues 90+4'	Report		Stadium: Vivekananda Yuba Bharati Krirangan; Attendance: 216; Referee: I Jamal Mohamed; Man of the Match: Bipin Singh (Mumbai City)

==== Knockout phase ====
As a result of finishing top of the group, Mumbai City advanced directly to the quarter-finals. The draw for knockout stages was held on 22 August 2023.

27 August 2023 Quarter-finals	Mumbai City	1–3	Mohun Bagan SG	Kolkata, West Bengal
18:00 IST	Bheke (yellow card) 12'; Díaz 28' (yellow card) 56'; Stewart (yellow card) 43'; V. Singh (yellow card) 90+5'; Griffiths (yellow card) 90+9'	Report	Cummings 9' (pen.); M. Singh 30'; Samad (yellow card) 36'; Kuruniyan (yellow card) 49'; A. Ali 63'	Stadium: Vivekananda Yuba Bharati Krirangan; Attendance: 19,735; Referee: R. Venkatesh; Man of the Match: Hugo Boumous (Mohun Bagan SG)

=== AFC Champions League ===
==== Group stage ====
Pos	Team	Pld	W	D	L	GF	GA	GD	Pts	Qualification	HIL	NAV	NAS	MUM
1	(Saudi Arabia) Al-Hilal	6	5	1	0	16	2	+14	16	Advance to round of 16	—	1–1	2–1	6–0
2	(Uzbekistan) Navbahor	6	4	1	1	11	6	+5	13	Advance to round of 16	0–2	—	2–1	3–0
3	(Iran) Nassaji Mazandaran	6	2	0	4	7	10	−3	6		0–3	1–3	—	2–0
4	(India) Mumbai City	6	0	0	6	1	17	−16	0		0–2	1–2	0–2	—

Source: AFC
Rules for classification: Tiebreakers

Win Draw Loss

18 September 2023 1	Mumbai City (India)	0–2	(Iran) Nassaji Mazandaran	Pune, India
19:30 IST	Apuia (yellow card) 45+7'; Díaz (yellow card) 65'; van Nieff (yellow card) 66'	Report	Hosseini 34'; Azadi 62'; Mohammadzadeh (yellow card) 65'; Abdi (yellow card) 90+6'	Stadium: Shree Shiv Chhatrapati Sports Complex; Attendance: 1,529; Referee: Shaun Evans (Australia)

3 October 2023 2	Navbahor (Uzbekistan)	3–0	(India) Mumbai City	Namangan, Uzbekistan
19:00 UZT (19:30 IST)	Iskanderov 52'; Yakhshiboev 58'; Yuldoshev (yellow card) 62'; Abdumannopov 88'; Akhmedov (yellow card) 90+6'	Report	Stewart (penalty missed) 43'; Díaz (yellow card) 66'	Stadium: Markaziy Stadium; Attendance: 8,230; Referee: Nazmi Nasaruddin (Malaysia)

23 October 2023 3	Al-Hilal (Saudi Arabia)	6–0	(India) Mumbai City	Riyadh, Saudi Arabia
21:00 UTC+3	Mitrović 5', 67', 80'; Milinković-Savić 75'; Al-Breik 82'; Al-Malki 90+5'	Report		Stadium: King Fahd International Stadium; Attendance: 10,046; Referee: Muhammad Taqi (Singapore)

6 November 2023 4	Mumbai City (India)	0–2	(Saudi Arabia) Al-Hilal	Navi Mumbai, India
19:30 UTC+5:30		Report	Michael 62'; Mitrović 85'	Stadium: DY Patil Stadium, Navi Mumbai; Referee: Adham Makhadmeh (Jordan)

28 November 2023 5	Nassaji Mazandaran (Iran)	2-0	(India) Mumbai City	Tehran, Iran
19:30 IRST (21:30 IST)	Reza Azadi 14'; Nongtdu 32' (o.g.)	Report		Stadium: Azadi Stadium; Attendance: 375; Referee: Hanna Hattab (Syria)

4 December 2023	Mumbai City (India)	1–2	(Uzbekistan) Navbahor	Pune, India
21:30 UTC+5:30	El Khayati 15'	Report	Iskanderov 29'; Đokić 45+3'	Stadium: Shree Shiv Chhatrapati Sports Complex, Pune; Referee: Nazmi Nasaruddin (Malaysia)

== Statistics ==
Keys
No.	Squad number	Pos.	Position
Player^{*}	Player who joined the club permanently or on loan during the season		
Player^{†}	Player who departed the club permanently or on loan during the season		

=== Appearances ===
Includes all competitions for senior teams.

As of 3 October 2023

2023–24 season								Club total
No.	Pos.	Player	Indian Super League	Super Cup	Durand Cup	Champions League	Total	Club total
1	GK	(India) Phurba Lachenpa	0	0	4	2	6	46
2	DF	(India) Rahul Bheke	2	0	4	1	7	54
3	DF	(India) Valpuia	0	0	1	0	1	6
4	DF	(Spain) Tiri^{*}	1+1	0	0	2	3+1	4
5	DF	(India) Mehtab Singh	1	0	4	1	6	67
6	FW	(India) Vikram Partap Singh	0+2	0	2+2	1+1	3+5	68
7	FW	(India) Lallianzuala Chhangte	2	0	3	2	7	53
8	MF	(Netherlands) Yoell van Nieff^{*}	1+1	0	3+1	2	6+2	8
10	MF	(Spain) Alberto Noguera	0	0	4	0	4	32
11	FW	(India) Gurkirat Singh	0	0	0+4	0+2	0+6	33
13	GK	(India) Mohammad Nawaz	2	0	0+1	0	2+1	24
16	MF	(India) Vinit Rai^{*}	1+1	0	0+2	0	1+3	37
17	DF	(India) Sanjeev Stalin	0	0	0+2	0	0+2	20
18	DF	(Australia) Rostyn Griffiths	2	0	1+1	2	5+1	30
20	DF	(India) Jayesh Rane^{*}	0+1	0	0	0	0+1	1
22	GK	(India) Bhaskar Roy	0	0	0	0	0	0
21	FW	(India) Seilenthang Lotjem	0	0	0	0	0	0
23	FW	(Netherlands) Nasser El Khayati	0+2	0	0	0+1	0+3	3
24	FW	(Scotland) Greg Stewart	2	0	4	2	8	36
27	DF	(India) Nathan Rodrigues^{*}	0	0	0+1	0	0+1	1
28	FW	(India) Ayush Chhikara	0	0	0+2	0	0+2	10
29	FW	(India) Bipin Singh	2	0	4	1+1	7+1	112
30	FW	(Argentina) Jorge Pereyra Díaz	2	0	4	2	8	33
31	DF	(India) Akash Mishra^{*}	2	0	2	2	6	6
32	GK	(India) Ahan Prakash	0	0	0	0	0	0
44	DF	(India) Halen Nongtdu	0	0	0+1	0	0+1	3
45	MF	(India) Lalengmawia Ralte (Apuia)	2	0	4	2	8	58
60	MF	(India) Franklin Nazareth^{*}	0	0	0+1	0	0+1	1
77	MF	(India) Gyamar Nikum	0	0	0	0	0	1

=== Goals ===
Includes all competitions for senior teams. The list is sorted by squad number when season-total goals are equal. Players with no goals are not included in the list.

As of 4 November 2023

2023–24 season									Club total
Rk.	No.	Pos.	Player	Indian Super League	Super Cup	Durand Cup	Champions League	Total	Club total
1	30	FW	(Argentina) Jorge Pereyra Díaz	6	0	5	0	11	23
2	7	FW	(India) Lallianzuala Chhangte	1	0	1	0	2	20
2	18	DF	(Australia) Rostyn Griffiths	1	0	1	0	2	3
2	23	FW	(Netherlands) Nasser El Khayati	1	0	0	1	2	2
2	24	FW	(Scotland) Greg Stewart	1	0	1	0	2	16
5	6	FW	(India) Vikram Partap Singh	0	0	1	0	1	9
5	8	MF	(Netherlands) Yoell van Nieff	0	0	1	0	1	1
5	10	MF	(Spain) Alberto Noguera	0	0	1	0	1	6
5	11	FW	(India) Gurkirat Singh	0	0	1	0	1	1
5	27	DF	(India) Nathan Rodrigues	0	0	1	0	1	1
5	31	DF	(India) Akash Mishra	1	0	0	0	1	1
5	47	MF	(India) Lalengmawia	1	0	0	0	1	-
Own goal(s)				1	0	0	0	1	—
Total				13	0	13	1	27	—

=== Assists ===
Includes all competitions. The list is sorted by squad number when total assists are equal. Players with no assists are not included in the list.

As of 3 October 2023

Rk.	No.	Pos.	Player	Indian Super League	Super Cup	Durand Cup	Champions League	Total
1	24	FW	(Scotland) Greg Stewart	1	0	3	0	4
2	10	MF	(Spain) Alberto Noguera	0	0	3	0	3
3	5	DF	(India) Mehtab Singh	1	0	1	0	2
3	6	FW	(India) Vikram Partap Singh	1	0	1	0	2
3	7	FW	(India) Lallianzuala Chhangte	1	0	1	0	2
3	29	FW	(India) Bipin Singh	0	0	2	0	2
3	30	FW	(Argentina) Jorge Pereyra Díaz	0	0	2	0	2
Total				4	0	13	0	17

=== Clean sheets ===
Includes all competitions. The list is sorted by squad number when total clean sheets are equal. Numbers in parentheses represent games where both goalkeepers participated and both kept a clean sheet; the number in parentheses is awarded to the goalkeeper who was substituted on, whilst a full clean sheet is awarded to the goalkeeper who was on the field at the start of play. Goalkeepers with no clean sheets not included in the list.

As of 3 October 2023

Rk.	No.	Goalkeeper	Indian Super League	Super Cup	Durand Cup	Champions League	Total
1	1	(India) Phurba Lachenpa	0	0	2	0	2
Total			0	0	2	0	2
