= Petr Krátký =

Czech football manager (born 1981)

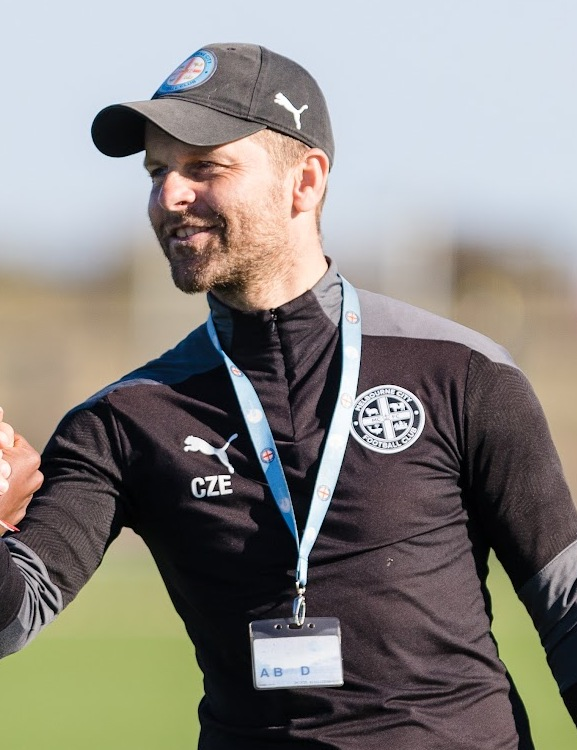
- Krátký with Melbourne City in 2021

Personal information
- Date of birth: 8 October 1981 (age 45)
- Place of birth: Prostějov, Czechoslovakia
- Height: 1.78 m (5 ft 10 in)
- Position: Right-back

Team information
- Current team: Melbourne City (assistant coach)

Senior career*
Years	Team	Apps	(Gls)
2001–2002	Prostějov	34	(6)
2002–2007	Mladá Boleslav	230	(16)
2005–2006	→ Brno (loan)	36	(4)
2007–2009	Slovan Liberec	56	(6)
2009–2015	Heidelberg United	184	(14)
Total		540	(46)

Managerial career
- 2017–2021: Melbourne City (youth)
- 2021–2023: Melbourne City (assistant)
- 2023–2026: Mumbai City
- 2026–: Melbourne City (assistant)
- * Club domestic league appearances and goals

Petr Krátký (born 8 October 1981) is a Czech professional football coach and former player who played as a right back. He is currently the assistant coach of A-League club Melbourne City.

== Playing career ==
Petr Krátký played as a right-back. He was raised in 1. SK Prostějov in his hometown. He spent large part of his playing career in FK Mladá Boleslav, with which he was promoted to the Czech First League in 2004. He then played 33 matches in the first league, 26 of which for Mladá Boleslav. In 2009, he left the Czech Republic and joined Heidelberg United FC in Australia, where he ended his active career in 2015.

== Coaching career ==
=== Melbourne City ===
In October 2021, Krátký was promoted to the role of Assistant Coach of A-League side Melbourne City, having previously served as their development coach. As assistant coach, he helped to guide the team to consecutive A-League Men's Premiers titles in 2021–22 and 2022–23 seasons. During his tenure, he served as an assistant under managers like Patrick Kisnorbo, Rado Vidosic and Aurelio Vidmar.

=== Mumbai City ===
==== 2023–24 season ====
On 9 December 2023, Krátký was appointed as the new head coach of Mumbai City after previous manager Des Buckingham parted ways with the club mid-season to join EFL League One side Oxford United. His first game ended in a 0–0 draw away to FC Goa on 12 December 2023. His first win came on 20 December 2023, in a fiery 2–1 win over Mohun Bagan SG, which included 11 yellow cards and seven red cards.

In the 2024 Super Cup, despite being allowed to play six foreign players, Krátký regularly fielded lineups with fewer foreigners. Despite this, Mumbai won all three games and qualified for the semi-final, but lost to Odisha FC following a goal from ex-Mumbai striker Diego Mauricio.

In Mumbai's first game after the Super Cup, the team lost 3–2 at home to Jamshedpur FC. However, Mumbai went on a 9-match unbeaten run after that match, consisting of 7 wins and 2 draws to put the club on top of the table going into the final day. On the final day of the season, Mumbai played against Mohun Bagan Super Giant, with the winner of the match winning the ISL League Shield as well. However, in the match between the two sides on 15 April 2024, Mohun Bagan emerged victorious, winning 2–1.

Going into the ISL playoffs, in the semi-final first leg on 24 April, Mumbai were 2–0 down away at FC Goa in the last few minutes of the match. However, Krátký continued his trust in Indian players, replacing Jakub Vojtus with Bipin Singh in the 65th minute, and then Yoell van Nieff and Tiri for Gurkirat Singh and Sanjeev Stalin in the 88th minute.

Playing with a single foreigner, Syrian defender Thaer Krouma, on the pitch, Mumbai mounted a late comeback with a brace from Lallianzuala Chhangte and a goal from Vikram Partap Singh. Krátký's substitutes played a crucial part in all three goals, with 64th-minute substitute Jayesh Rane assisting both of Chhangte's goals, and Vikram's goal coming from a rebound from a long-range shot from substitute Gurkirat Singh.

All three goals came extremely late, with Chhangte's first goal being in the 90th minute, Vikram's goal being in the 91st minute, and Chhangte's second goal being in the 96th minute. In the second leg back in Mumbai, the club won 2–0 with goals from Jorge Pereyra Diaz and Lallianzuala Chhangte to progress to the ISL Cup Final.

In the final, Mumbai were to face off against Mohun Bagan again, aiming to stop their opponents from winning the ISL Shield and ISL Cup double. This time, though, Krátký was able to get a win as Mumbai won 3–1 with goals from Jorge Pereyra Diaz, Bipin Singh, and Jakub Vojtus. This secured the second ISL Cup in the club's history, and the first trophy for Krátký as a head coach.

==== 2024–25 season ====
Following pre-season abroad, Mumbai began the 2024–25 season with a 2–2 draw away against Mohun Bagan Super Giant, with Thaer Krouma scoring a late equalizer.

=== Return to Melbourne City ===
After his departure from Mumbai City, Krátký returned to Melbourne City as an assistant coach.

== Managerial statistics ==
As of match played 4 May 2024

Managerial record by team and tenure
Team	Nat	From	To	Record								Ref.
Team	Nat	From	To	M	W	D	L	GF	GA	GD	Win %	Ref.
Mumbai City	(India)	9 December 2023	18 July 2026	68	36	16	16	100	67	+33	52.94	
Total				68	36	16	16	100	67	+33	52.94	

== Honours ==
Mumbai City

- ISL Cup: 2023–24
