= Hmingthanmawia Ralte =

Indian footballer

Valpuia Ralte
Personal information
- Full name: Hmingthanmawia Ralte
- Date of birth: 31 May 2000 (age 26)
- Place of birth: Aizawl, Mizoram, India
- Height: 1.78 m (5 ft 10 in)
- Positions: Right-back; centre-back

Team information
- Current team: Mumbai City
- Number: 3

Youth career
- –2017: Aizawl

Senior career*
Years	Team	Apps	(Gls)
2017–2019	Aizawl	25	(0)
2019–2025	Mumbai City	49	(0)
2022–2023	→ RoundGlass Punjab (loan)	16	(1)

International career^{‡}
2024–	India	8	(0)
Medal record
Representing India
CAFA Nations Cup
Third place	2025 Tajikistan–Uzbekistan	Team
- * Club domestic league appearances and goals as of 16:50, 18 April 2026 (UTC) ‡ National team caps and goals as of 22:30, 6 October 2026 (UTC)

Hmingthanmawia Ralte (born 31 May 2000), commonly known by his nickname Valpuia, is an Indian professional footballer who plays as a defender for Indian Super League club Mumbai City and the India national team.

== Club career ==
=== Aizawl ===
Born in Aizawl, Mizoram. Valpuia started playing football at the age of 8. After representing Mizoram in sub juniors, Valpuia was selected by Aizawl FC junior team. He was the main defender for junior team for two seasons. In September 2017, Valpuia was promoted to Aizawl F.C. senior team for Mizoram Premier League and I-League.

=== Mumbai City ===
==== Early years ====
On 10 June 2019, Valpuia signed for ISL club Mumbai City FC on a two-year contract. He made four ISL appearances in his debut season, as Mumbai finished fifth. Despite not playing a single game in the ISL in the club's 2020-21 double-winning season, Valpuia signed a fresh four-year contract until 2025.

==== Loan spell at Punjab ====
On August 10, 2022, Mumbai City FC announced that Valpuia would go on loan to I-League club Roundglass Punjab (now Punjab FC). In the I-League, he played regularly and shone, even scoring his first senior goal while at the club. His loan spell ended with him having made 15 appearances in the club's successful 2022–23 I-League season, as Punjab became the first ever club to get promoted into the ISL.

==== Return to Mumbai City ====
===== 2023/24 season =====
Following his loan spell, he was kept at the club by manager Des Buckingham. He made his Mumbai debut in the Durand Cup, playing the full 90 minutes in Mumbai's 5–0 defeat of Jamshedpur FC. He also made his AFC Champions debut, playing in an all-Indian line-up away against F.C. Nassaji Mazandaran, due to visa issues for the club's foreign players preventing them from travelling to Iran. However, Valpuia never made a league appearance under Buckingham, and was regularly left on the bench.

Although, when Buckingham left to go to EFL League One side Oxford United, Mumbai appointed Petr Kratky as their new head coach, Valpuia was given a chance in the first team. In Kratky's third match against Mohun Bagan, following an early red card for Akash Mishra, Valpuia was substituted onto the pitch in the 17th minute, playing until the 68th minute when he was substituted back off for winger Vikram Partap Singh. Due to a suspension to regular right-back Rahul Bheke at the end of the match, Kratky trusted Valpuia to start the two games Bheke was banned for. They were away versus Kerala Blasters, which ended in a 2–0 loss, and at home in a 3–0 win over Chennaiyin FC.

With the season breaking for the 2023 AFC Asian Cup, and the Kalinga Super Cup being played at the same time, players called up for the Indian national team for the Asian Cup could not play for their clubs in the Super Cup. With Bheke called up for India, the Super Cup presented a chance to Valpuia for regular game time, which he was given by Kratky. He started all 3 group stage games for The Islanders. Despite having thought he scored his first goal for the club versus Gokulam Kerala FC, the referee controversially ruled it out. He scored his first goal for the club against Chennaiyin FC, with a towering header from a Yoell van Nieff free kick. This goal was crucial, as it was the winning goal that ensured Mumbai's passage to the Super Cup semi-final ahead of the aforementioned Chennaiyin. He played in the semi-final as well, but Mumbai lost to Odisha FC, thanks to a 42nd-minute penalty from ex-Mumbai forward Diego Maurício.

Valpuia continued competing with Rahul Bheke, and occasionally Mehtab Singh for the right back spot for the rest of the season, eventually ending in Mumbai reaching and winning the ISL final over Mohun Bagan.

On 12 June 2024, Valpuia signed a contract extension until 2027 with Mumbai City FC.

===== 2024/25 season =====
Valpuia began the season as Mumbai's first choice right-back following the contract expiry and departure of Rahul Bheke to Bengaluru FC. He made his first appearance of the season against Mohun Bagan Super Giant in an entertaining 2–2 draw.

== International career ==
On November 5, Valpuia was called up to the India squad for the first time by manager Manolo Márquez for a friendly against Malaysia. Valpuia started on the bench, but came on to make his international debut as a 76th-minute substitute for Rahul Bheke, as the match ended 1–1.

== Career statistics ==
=== Club ===
As of 16 April 2023

Club	Season	League			Cup		AFC		Total	
Club	Season	Division	Apps	Goals	Apps	Goals	Apps	Goals	Apps	Goals
Aizawl	2017–18	I-League	10	0	2 (Note: Appearance(s) in Super Cup)	0	5 (Note: Appearance(s) in AFC Cup)	0	17	0
Aizawl	2018–19	I-League	15	0	0	0	—		15	0
Aizawl	Aizawl total		25	0	2	0	5	0	32	0
Mumbai City	2019–20	Indian Super League	4	0	0	0	—		4	0
Mumbai City	2020–21	Indian Super League	0	0	0	0	—		0	0
Mumbai City	2021–22	Indian Super League	1	0	0	0	—		1	0
Mumbai City	Mumbai City total		5	0	0	0	0	0	5	0
RoundGlass Punjab (loan)	2022–23	I-League	15	1	3	1	—		18	2
Career total			45	1	5	1	5	0	55	2

=== International ===
As of 6 October 2026

National team	Year	Apps	Goals
India	2024	1	0
India	2025	5	0
India	2026	2	0
Total		8	0

== Honours ==
India

- SAFF Championship: 2026
