= Yoëll van Nieff =

Dutch footballer

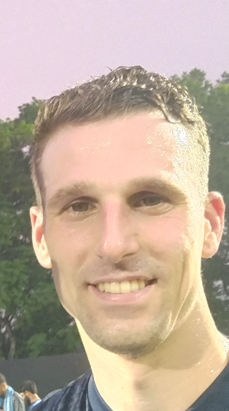
- van Nieff in 2023

Personal information
- Full name: Yoëll van Nieff
- Date of birth: 17 June 1993 (age 33)
- Place of birth: Groningen, Netherlands
- Height: 1.80 m (5 ft 11 in)
- Position: Defensive midfielder

Team information
- Current team: Anorthosis Famagusta
- Number: 8

Youth career
- Groningen

Senior career*
Years	Team	Apps	(Gls)
2013–2018	Groningen	84	(2)
2016–2018	Jong Groningen	3	(0)
2013–2014	→ Dordrecht (loan)	21	(9)
2015–2016	→ Excelsior (loan)	5	(0)
2018–2019	Heracles Almelo	15	(0)
2019–2023	Puskás AFC	104	(3)
2023–2025	Mumbai City	42	(3)
2025–	Anorthosis Famagusta	0	(0)
2025–2026	→ Omonia Aradippou (loan)	0	(0)

International career
2009–2010	Netherlands U17	3	(0)
2010–2011	Netherlands U18	5	(0)
- * Club domestic league appearances and goals as of 13:08, 29 March 2025 (UTC)

Yoëll van Nieff (born 17 June 1993) is a Dutch professional footballer who plays as a defensive midfielder for Cypriot First Division club Anorthosis Famagusta.

Van Nieff formerly played on loan for FC Dordrecht and Excelsior and for Heracles Almelo. Besides the Netherlands, he has played in Hungary, India, and Cyprus.

== Club career ==
=== Mumbai City FC ===
==== 2023-24 ====
On 12 July 2023, Mumbai City FC announced that they had signed Yoëll on a two-year deal, following his release from Puskás Akadémia FC. He made his debut for the club in the 2023 Durand Cup in the club's first match of the tournament, versus Mohammedan SC as a substitute. In the club's next match vs Jamshedpur FC on 8 August 2023, he scored his first Mumbai City FC goal with a half-volley from a corner, the fourth goal in an eventual 5–0 victory for Mumbai.

He made his ISL debut in the club's first match of the season, away versus NorthEast United FC on 24 September 2023. He played 68 minutes in midfield until he was replaced by another new signing, Tiri. In the club's first home ISL match of the season versus Kerala Blasters, Yoëll was shown a red card alongside Blasters player Miloš Drinčić for their part in a fight during injury time at the end of the match, which concluded in a 2–1 victory for Mumbai.

On 12 March 2024, Van Nieff scored his first ISL goal. After Akash Mishra won a penalty in first-half stoppage time, Van Nieff stepped up and scored. This penalty was the third goal, in an eventual 4–1 win for Mumbai City. This match was exceptional for Van Nieff, as he also got an assist for the first goal of the game with a pinpoint aerial pass to Vikram Partap Singh.

Van Nieff won his first trophy in India at the end of the season, winning the ISL Final over Mohun Bagan to win the ISL Cup. However, van Nieff was suspended for the final due to yellow card accumulation.

==== 2024-25 ====
Following pre-season abroad, van Nieff made his first appearance of the season in a thrilling 2–2 draw away against Mohun Bagan. He scored his first goal of the season away against Jamshedpur FC with a curling long shot into the top corner. It was Mumbai's second goal of the match, but was not enough to prevent a 3–2 loss for the club.

He scored his second goal of the season away against FC Goa, picking up the ball near the centre circle, dribbling forward, and taking a long shot that went past FC Goa goalkeeper Laxmikant Kattimani and into the bottom corner. This was Mumbai's first win of the season as well.

On 1 March 2025, Van Nieff put in a man of the match display at home against Mohun Bagan, in an eventual 2–2 draw.

On 26 May 2025, Mumbai City confirmed that van Nieff was going to be leaving the club following the expiry of his contract.

== Career statistics ==
=== Club ===
As of match played 2 March 2025

Appearances and goals by club, season and competition
Club	Season	League			National cup (Note: Includes KNVB Cup, Magyar Kupa, Super Cup)		Continental		Other		Total	
Club	Season	Division	Apps	Goals	Apps	Goals	Apps	Goals	Apps	Goals	Apps	Goals
Groningen	2012–13	Eredivisie	1	0	0	0	—		—		1	0
Groningen	2013–14	Eredivisie	15	0	0	0	0	0	—		15	0
Groningen	2014–15	Eredivisie	24	1	5	2	1 (Note: Appearance(s) in UEFA Europa League)	0	—		30	3
Groningen	2015–16	Eredivisie	0	0	0	0	0	0	—		0	0
Groningen	2016–17	Eredivisie	23	0	2	0	0	0	—		25	0
Groningen	2017–18	Eredivisie	21	1	0	0	0	0	—		21	1
Groningen	Total		84	2	7	2	1	0	—		92	4
Dordrecht (loan)	2013–14	Eerste Divisie	21	9	1	0	0	0	—		22	9
Excelsior (loan)	2015–16	Eredivisie	5	0	0	0	0	0	—		5	0
Heracles Almelo	2018–19	Eredivisie	15	0	0	0	0	0	—		15	0
Puskás AFC	2019–20	NB I	28	2	5	2	0	0	—		33	4
Puskás AFC	2020–21	NB I	24	0	4	0	0	0	—		28	0
Puskás AFC	2021–22	NB I	28	0	2	0	4 (Note: Appearance(s) in UEFA Europa Conference League)	1	—		34	1
Puskás AFC	2022–23	NB I	24	1	4	0	2	0	—		30	1
Puskás AFC	Total		104	3	15	2	6	1	—		125	6
Mumbai City	2023–24	Indian Super League	19	1	4	0	5 (Note: Appearance(s) in AFC Champions League)	0	4 (Note: Appearance(s) in Durand Cup)	1	32	2
Mumbai City	2024–25	Indian Super League	20	2	-	-	-	-	-	-	2	1
Career statistics			257	16	23	4	11	1	4	1	295	22

== Honours ==
Groningen

- KNVB Cup: 2014–15

Mumbai City

- ISL Cup: 2023–24
