= Bipin Singh Thounaojam =

Indian footballer (born 1995)

Bipin Singh
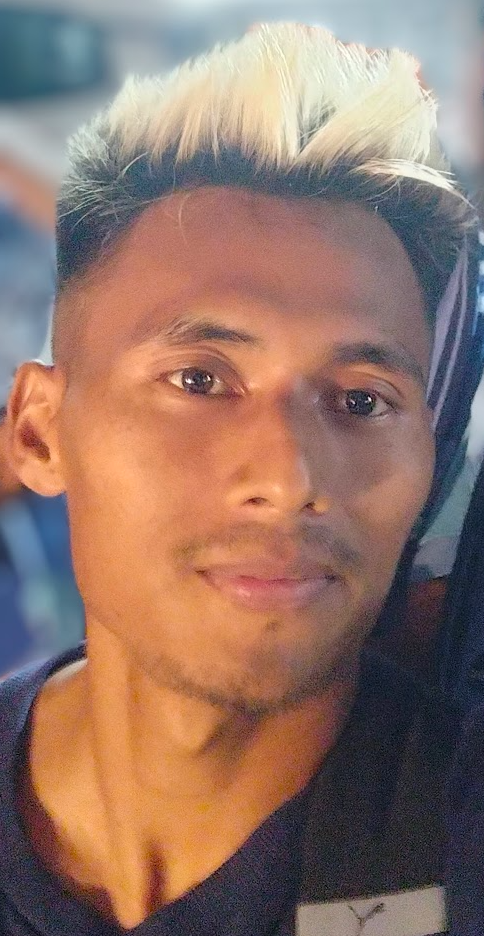
- Bipin with Mumbai City in 2024

Personal information
- Full name: Bipin Singh Thounajam
- Date of birth: 10 March 1995 (age 31)
- Place of birth: Wangoi, Manipur, India
- Height: 1.76 m (5 ft 9 in)
- Position: Winger

Team information
- Current team: East Bengal
- Number: 29

Youth career
- 2008–2011: Wafa Wangoi Club
- 2011–2012: Manipur Police Sports Club
- 2012–2013: Shillong Lajong

Senior career*
Years	Team	Apps	(Gls)
2012–2017	Shillong Lajong	38	(1)
2017–2018	ATK	12	(2)
2018–2025	Mumbai City	129	(25)
2025–	East Bengal	10	(4)

International career^{‡}
2021–	India	7	(0)
- * Club domestic league appearances and goals as of 10:00, 29 March 2025 (UTC) ‡ National team caps and goals as of 17:42, 05 September 2021 (UTC)

Bipin Singh Thounaojam (Meitei: Thounaojam Bipin Singh, born 10 March 1995) is an Indian professional footballer who plays as a winger for Indian Super League club East Bengal and the India national team.

== Club career ==
=== Youth career ===
At the age of 13, Bipin joined one of Manipur's most famous youth clubs called Wafa Wangoi Club where he stayed for three years. He then moved on to Manipur Police Sports Club where he further honed his skills.

=== Shillong Lajong ===
After years of consistent displays, a 17-year-old Bipin found his way the senior setup of Shillong Lajong for the 2012–13 I-League season. He made his professional debut for Shillong Lajong in the I-League on 22 December 2012 against ONGC at the Jawaharlal Nehru Stadium when he came on as an 81st-minute substitute for Gbeneme Friday as Shillong Lajong lost the match 3–0. For the first three seasons, he mostly came on as a substitute to replace tired legs or for a change of tactics. He only became a first teamer for the club from the 2015–16 I-League under the stewardship of head coach Thangboi Singto. It took him over 4 years to score his first professional goal of his career and the club, against Chennai City on 19 February 2017, when he curled a sublime effort into the top corner, giving the opposition goalkeeper absolutely no chance to save it. He made 38 appearances for the club in the I-League, scoring a solitary goal in the process.

=== ATK ===
Bipin was picked up by ATK during the player draft ahead of the 2017–18 Indian Super League season. He made his debut for the club on 17 November 2017, when he came on as a 74th-minute substitute against Kerala Blasters in a match which finished 0-0. He scored his first goal for the club in only his second appearance, when he curled in a brilliant free-kick which kissed the crossbar and went in. Though Bipin's goal was a mere consolation as ATK lost 4–1 to Pune City. He finished the season with 2 ISL goals in 12 appearances. He showed flashes of brilliance and an impressive work rate.

=== 2018-2020: Initial seasons at Mumbai City ===
On 1 August 2018, the Islanders completed the signing of Bipin on a two-year contract. He made his debut for the club against Jamshedpur on 2 October 2018, which ended in a 2–0 loss. Bipin was used as a reserve player by then-Mumbai head coach Jorge Costa, only making seven appearances throughout the season, with five of those seven being off the bench.

Bipin made his first appearance of the 2019–20 season away against Chennaiyin FC in a 0–0 draw. He scored his first goal for the club at home against Odisha FC, scoring the last goal of the match in an eventual 4–2 loss, with his cross going into the goal after a touch from goalkeeper Francisco Dorronsoro. The goal was credited to Bipin, rather than going down as an own goal. He scored his second goal of the season on 12 February 2020 against Goa in a 5–2 loss. This season, though, Bipin was afforded more playing time, making four starts out of a total of 15 appearances.

=== Breakthrough 2020-21 season under Sergio Lobera ===
It wasn't until the 2020–21 Indian Super League, with Spaniard Sergio Lobera in charge of the club, that Bipin finally came alive. He made his first appearance of the season away against FC Goa, coming off the bench in a 1–0 win for The Islanders. He scored his first goal of the season away against Bengaluru FC, scoring Mumbai's second goal in an eventual 3–1 win for the club.

Throughout the season, Bipin scored six goals, including a hat-trick against Odisha on the penultimate date of the 2020–21 Indian Super League regular season. This hat-trick was also the first hat-trick of the season. In the playoffs, Bipin went on to score a dream match winning goal in the 2021 Indian Super League final against ATK Mohun Bagan, as the Islanders won the Indian Super League Winners Shield and the League title for the first time. This was also the first time, and till date the only time, a club has won both trophies in a single season.

On 19 April 2021, Bipin signed a new four-year contract with Mumbai City, keeping him at the club until May 2025.

=== 2021-2023: Key player under Des Buckingham ===
Following the departure of Sergio Lobera to Chinese club Sichuan Jiuniu, Mumbai appointed Des Buckingham as the club's new head coach. Bipin remained a regular in the team, making his first appearance of the season on 22 November 2021 in a 3–0 win against FC Goa. Bipin scored his first goal of the season in a 5–1 win against ATK Mohun Bagan, scoring Mumbai's fifth goal in the 51st minute of the match. Bipin started all 20 games of the season, contributing six goals and three assists from the left wing.

On 14 September 2022, Bipin became the all-time joint goalscorer for Mumbai City alongside Modou Sougou, when he scored a 90th-minute winner against Mohammedan in the semi-finals of the Durand Cup. On 15 October, Bipin became the all-time top scorer for the club, scoring Mumbai's second goal at home against Odisha FC, with the match ending 2–0.

Bipin went on a 3-game scoring streak as well, scoring against Chennaiyin FC, Bengaluru FC, and NorthEast United FC. He remained a key part of the team, as the club went on a record-breaking 18-match unbeaten run to win the ISL Shield.

In the playoffs, despite scoring a goal in the semi-final second leg versus Bengaluru FC, the Islanders eventually lost 9–8 in a penalty shootout, ending their hopes of replicating their 20-21 ISL double. Bipin made 22 appearances throughout the season, scoring 7 goals and providing 2 assists.

=== 2023-24 season: Record-breaker at Mumbai City FC ===
Bipin made his first appearance of the 2023–24 season on 21 September 2023 away against NorthEast United FC. playing from the start in a 2–1 win for Mumbai. He scored his first goal of the season at home against Mohun Bagan Super Giant, scoring Mumbai's second goal in an eventual 2–1 win. He also got the assist for Mumbai's first goal with a pinpoint cross to Mumbai attacking midfielder Greg Stewart. However, the game gained attention due to the number of cards awarded, with the referee showing 11 yellow cards and 7 red cards.

On 2 March 2024, Bipin became the first-ever Indian player to make 100 appearances for Mumbai City FC, following his appearance in a 3–2 away win against Punjab FC.

During this season, Bipin was used as a rotation player, due to the form of Vikram Partap Singh meaning he played ahead of Bipin at left-wing. This led to him occasionally being used as a right-winger as well.

Eventually, following a loss on the final day, Mumbai lost the ISL Shield to Mohun Bagan. However, the club took revenge in the ISL Cup final. Bipin once again scored in an ISL Cup final against Mohun Bagan, getting Mumbai's second goal with a tap-in from close range. This led to an eventual 3–1 win, securing the second ISL Cup in the club's history, and of Bipin's career.

=== 2024-25: Final season and departure ===
Bipin made his first appearance of the 2024–25 season away against Mohun Bagan on September 13, playing from the start in a 2–2 draw. On 26 January 2025, Bipin made his 150th appearance for Mumbai City in all competitions, playing from the start in a 3–0 win at home vs Mohammedan SC. In this match, Bipin played a key role in Mumbai's first goal, with Mohammedan defender Gaurav Bora attempting to head Bipin's cross back to the keeper Padam Chhetri, who couldn't prevent the ball from going into the net.

Bipin scored his only goal of the 2024–25 season away against NorthEast United on 7 February 2025. Playing from the start as a left-winger, Bipin headed in a Brandon Fernandes cross in the 41st minute, which was the first goal in an eventual 2–0 win for Mumbai.

On 31 March 2025, Mumbai City FC announced that they would be parting ways with Bipin, bringing his 7-year stint with the club to an end. Mumbai City announced that they would retire his jersey number 29 to honour his contributions and carry forward his legacy at the club.

=== East Bengal ===
On 3 July 2025, fellow ISL club East Bengal announced the signing of Bipin on a two-year contract, valid until the end of the 2026–27 season.

== International career ==
On 2 March 2021, Bipin Singh got selected for the 35-man-squad national camp ahead of India national team's friendlies against Oman and UAE. On 25 March, he made his debut against Oman, which ended as 1–1.

== Career statistics ==
=== Club ===
As of 23 July 2025

Club	Season	League			National Cup (Note: Includes Federation Cup, Super Cup)		AFC		Other		Total	
Club	Season	Division	Apps	Goals	Apps	Goals	Apps	Goals	Apps	Goals	Apps	Goals
Shillong Lajong	2012–13	I-League	5	0	0	0	–		–		5	0
Shillong Lajong	2013–14	I-League	2	0	0	0	–		–		2	0
Shillong Lajong	2014–15	I-League	0	0	0	0	–		–		0	0
Shillong Lajong	2015–16	I-League	15	0	0	0	–		–		15	0
Shillong Lajong	2016–17	I-League	16	1	3	0	–		–		19	1
Shillong Lajong	Total		38	1	3	0	–		–		41	1
ATK	2017–18	Indian Super League	12	2	2	0	–		–		14	2
Mumbai City	2018–19	Indian Super League	7	0	1	0	–		–		8	0
Mumbai City	2019–20	Indian Super League	15	1	0	0	–		–		15	1
Mumbai City	2020–21	Indian Super League	22	6	0	0	–		–		22	6
Mumbai City	2021–22	Indian Super League	20	6	0	0	6 (Note: Appearances in AFC Champions League)	0	–		26	6
Mumbai City	2022–23	Indian Super League	22	7	3	0	—		8 (Note: Seven appearances and one goal in Durand Cup, one appearance in play-offs for AFC Champions League)	1	33	8
Mumbai City	2023–24	Indian Super League	22	4	0	0	6	0	4 (Note: Appearance(s) in Durand Cup)	0	32	4
Mumbai City	2024–25	Indian Super League	21	1	1	1	–		–		22	2
Mumbai City	Total		129	25	5	1	12	0	12	1	158	27
East Bengal	2025–26	Indian Super League	0	0	0	0	–		1	2	1	1
Career total			179	28	10	1	12	0	13	2	214	31

=== International ===
As of 22 March 20231

Appearances and goals by national team, year and competition
Team	Year	Competitive		Friendly		Total	
Team	Year	Apps	Goals	Apps	Goals	Apps	Goals
India	2021	3	0	3	0	6	0
India	2023	0	0	1	0	1	0
Total		3	0	4	0	7	0

== Honours ==
Shillong Lajong

- Golaghat All-India Invitational Cup: 2013
- Shillong Premier League: 2015
- Meghalaya Invitation Football Tournament: 2016

Mumbai City

- Indian Super League Cup: 2020–21, 2023–24
- Indian Super League League Shield: 2020–21, 2022–23
- Durand Cup runner-up: 2022

East Bengal FC

- Indian Super League: 2025–26

India

- Tri-Nation Series: 2023

Individual

- Indian Super League Hero of the Month: November 2022
