= Mumbai City FC =

Association football club in India

Mumbai City
- Full name: Mumbai City Football Club
- Nickname: The Islanders
- Short name: MCFC
- Founded: 30 August 2014; 12 years ago
- Ground: Mumbai Football Arena
- Capacity: 7,000
- Owner(s): Ranbir Kapoor (50%); Bimal Parekh (50%)
- Head coach: Ashvir Singh Johal
- League: Indian Super League
- 2025–26: Indian Super League, 3rd of 14
- Website: mumbaicityfc.com
Home colours	Away colours

Mumbai City FC is an Indian professional football club based in Mumbai, Maharashtra. They compete in the Indian Super League, the top tier of the Indian football league system. Founded on 30 August 2014, Mumbai City is one of the most successful clubs in Indian Super League history, jointly holding the record with Mohun Bagan Super Giant for the most major ISL honours, having won two ISL League Winners Shields and two ISL Cups. The club became the first in ISL history to win both the League Winners Shield and the ISL Cup in the same season, achieving the feat in the 2020–21 season campaign.

== History ==
In early 2014, it was announced that the All India Football Federation, the national federation for Football in India, and IMG-Reliance would be accepting bids for ownership of eight of nine selected cities for the upcoming Indian Super League, an eight-team franchise league modeled along the lines of the Indian Premier League, the country's professional cricket league.

=== First season (2014) under Peter Reid ===
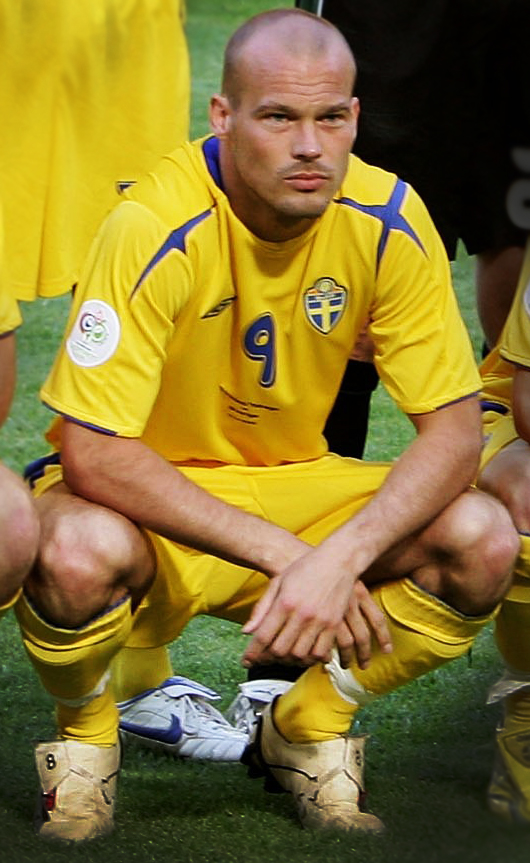
Swedish international Freddie Ljungberg, club's first marquee player.

On 15 September 2014, the club signed Nicolas Anelka, a former French international who had been a free agent since his departure from West Bromwich Albion earlier in the year. Three days later, former Swedish international Freddie Ljungberg was signed as the team's first marquee player, returning from two years of retirement. Englishman Peter Reid was appointed as the team's first ever head coach.

Mumbai were the visitors in the first ever ISL match on 12 October 2014, at Atlético de Kolkata's Salt Lake Stadium. Without Anelka and Ljungberg, the side lost 3–0. On 18 October 2014, the club registered their first-ever ISL victory, defeating FC Pune City 5–0 at the DY Patil Stadium. In this match, Brazilian forward André Moritz registered the first ever hat-trick of the ISL. The team finished seventh out of eight in the table, and did not qualify for the playoffs.

=== Second season (2015) under Nicolas Anelka ===
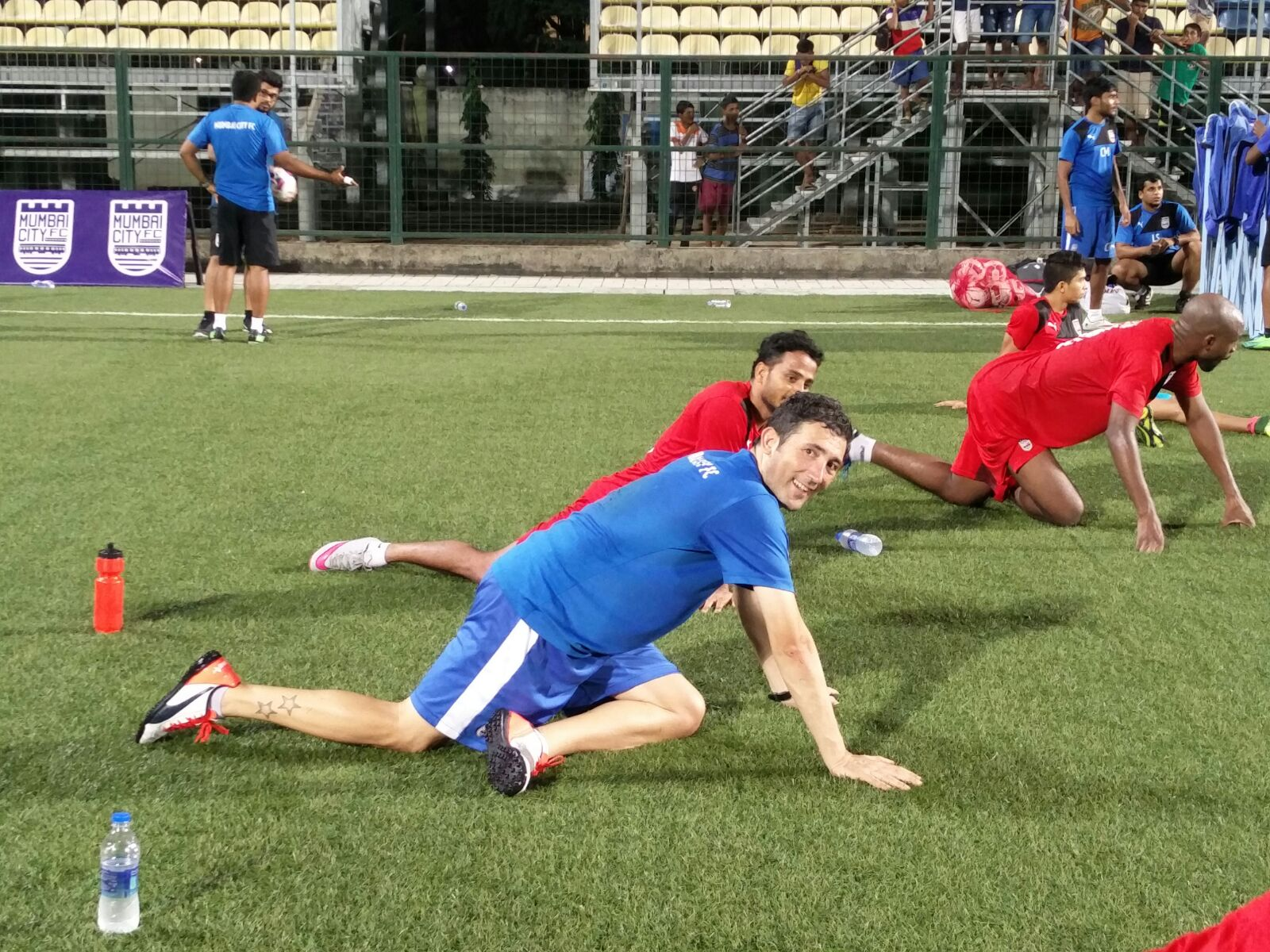
Mumbai City players in practice at the Cooperage Ground in December 2015

In July 2015, Nicolas Anelka became player-manager, replacing Peter Reid. Frantz Bertin was appointed captain at the beginning of the season. The club then roped in then-India captain Sunil Chhetri for a domestic record-breaking deal of ₹1.2 crore, alongside signing the 2015 I-League Player of the Year Sony Norde of Haiti. Sunil Chhetri was the top scorer for the team, scoring seven goals including a hat-trick against NorthEast United FC. Mumbai only won four matches and lost six to finish in sixth position in the league table. Due to such results, Anelka opted not to renew his contract and left his position at the end of the season.

=== Alexandre Guimarães era (2016–2018) ===
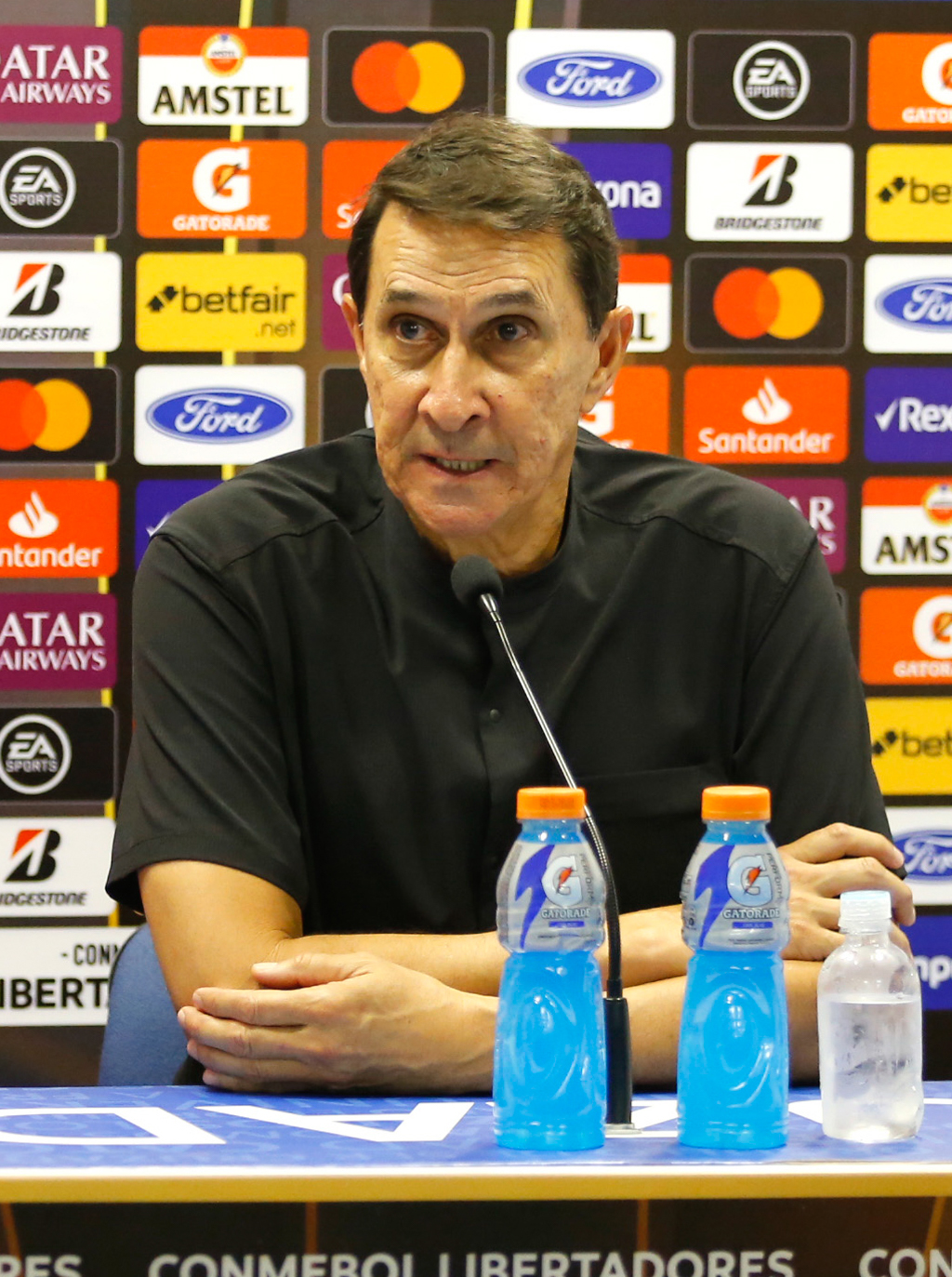
Alexandre Guimarães was appointed as head coach of Mumbai City for the 2016–17 season

After the first two seasons, Mumbai City's management made big changes by appointing Alexandre Guimarães, a former Costa Rica international, as the head coach for the 2016 ISL season. The club moved into their new home stadium, the Mumbai Football Arena, at Andheri. The club also signed 2010 FIFA World Cup Golden Ball winner Diego Forlán on a three-month deal, with the option to extend for another year as a marquee player for the season.

The arrival of the Uruguayan changed the dynamics of the struggling Mumbai team to title contenders. Forlán scored the first hat-trick of the Hero ISL 2016 season as The Islanders beat Kerala Blasters 5–0 at Mumbai Football Arena on 19 November 2016. It was also the first hat-trick of any marquee player in the history of the ISL. The team conceded the fewest goals (8) of all teams in the league, whilst Lucian Goian finished with the most tackles (67). Alexandre's team kept eight clean sheets in the group stage, making it a record across all three tournament editions. As a result, Mumbai City finished the 14 rounds at the top of the table, with six wins, five draws, and three losses. However, the club lost to ATK in the two-legged semi-finals.

In 2017, the ISL announced another auction in order to make way for new entrants Jamshedpur FC & Bengaluru FC, which led other clubs to start the squad rebuilding process once again. While Mumbai City missed their star performers, including the club's all-time top goalscorer Sunil Chhetri, the club managed to retain Alexandre Guimarães after he guided the club to their first-ever playoffs in three seasons. The club also managed to retain captain & goalkeeper Amrinder Singh for 12 million INR after he was awarded the best goalkeeper in the previous season, while keeping a record number of clean sheets for the club. They also retained the services of midfielder Sehnaj Singh who was instrumental in the club's success in the previous season. In the foreign department, they retained the defensive duo of Goian and Gerson Vieira, alongside Brazilian midfielder Léo Costa. They also retained Rakesh Oram, a player under the U-21 player quota.

However, the club's new signings did not perform at their best, as they finished the season in 7th position, failing to qualify for the playoffs, with the coach being criticized for overly defensive tactics. After the ISL season had concluded, Mumbai City FC also took part in the inaugural edition of the Super Cup. They kicked off proceedings smoothly by defeating Indian Arrows by a scoreline reading 2–1 in the qualifier round. However, they were defeated by East Bengal FC in the Round of 16. On 14 August 2018, The club stated that they and Alexandre Guimarães had parted company by mutual consent. This ended the Guimarães Era, with the Brazilian-born Costa Rican manager being with the Islanders since 2016.

=== Jorge Costa era (2018–2020) ===
After the announcement that Mumbai City FC had parted ways with Guimarães, the Islanders announced they had appointed former Portugal international Jorge Costa as the club's new head coach. The club also signed Indian Internationals Alen Deory and Subhasish Bose along with foreign players such as Modou Sougou, Rafael Bastos, Arnold Issoko and Paulo Machado.

The team started the season with a 2–0 loss at home to Jamshedpur FC, followed by a 1–1 draw to Kerala Blasters. The team then recorded a 2–0 win against FC Pune City, then lost 5–0 to rivals FC Goa. After that run of results, Jorge Costa made tactical changes, which led to the club's best unbeaten run in history at the time (9 games unbeaten). The team ended December with a 6–1 win against Kerala Blasters, with Modou Sougou scoring 4 of the team's six goals in the match, which was a record-breaking tally as Sougou became the first player in the league to score four goals in a single match. It was Mumbai's best-ever victory against any club. They also managed to break league leaders Bengaluru FC's unbeaten run at Mumbai Football Arena in January 2019.

The club managed to secure a play-off finish with a 3–1 victory against ATK on 22 February 2019 with a game in hand, thanks to Modou Sougou's second hat-trick in the league. The 3rd-place finish saw them face off against FC Goa, which resulted in a 5–1 defeat at home despite Mumbai opening the scoring. They managed to bounce back and beat Goa 1-0 in the away fixture, but it wasn't enough to overturn the deficit. Even though Mumbai lost in the Play-offs, Arnold Issoko won the DHL Winning Pass of the League Award for getting the most assists in the league (8), and Modou Sougou became the joint-second top scorer with 12 goals. Fan favorite Amrinder Singh ended the league with the most saves and joint-highest number of clean sheets (6). On 19 March 2019, the club confirmed that Jorge Costa had extended his stay for one year.

The next task for Jorge Costa and his side was the 2019 Super Cup, with the Islanders drawn to play Chennaiyin FC in the Round of 16. They were eliminated with a 2–0 defeat.

==== 2019–20 season ====
After announcing the departure of club captain Lucian Goian, Mumbai brought in Mato Grgic, Sèrge Kevyn, Amine Chermiti, Diego Carlos, and Mohamed Larbi, with the first game of the 2019–20 season resulting in a 1–0 win over Kerala Blasters. On 28 November 2019, City Football Group, a subsidiary of Abu Dhabi United Group, acquired a major stake in Mumbai City FC. This was the first time European club had acquired a majority stake in an Indian club. There were ups and downs for Jorge Costa's team, but injuries to the mainstays of the team hampered Mumbai City FC's good run. In the end, they fell short of the final playoff spot by just three points by losing to Chennaiyin FC.

The Islanders had a record 12 different playing scoring the team's 25 goals. They also became the first team to do a league double over Bengaluru FC in ISL history. After finishing fifth, and with the City Football Group ownership coming into full effect, Jorge Costa's reign at the club ended.

=== Acquisition by CFG and success under Sergio Lobera (2020–2021) ===

2021 Indian Super League final Lineup

Under the new ownership, the club signed former FC Goa coach Sergio Lobera. The club signed Hugo Boumous after paying a release clause of ₹1.6 crores, a record fee in Indian football. Along with Boumous, they signed some core players from Goa, including Fall, Jahouh, Mandar, and Jackichand. During the first phase of the league, Mumbai City got 25 points which included eight wins, one draw, and one loss. A win against Mohun Bagan in the final match of the league stage made them the winners of the League Shield, thus qualifying for the 2022 AFC Champions League group stage. By doing so, they became the second Indian club after FC Goa to play in the Champions League.

The Islanders had earlier sealed their playoff berth with a 3–3 draw against FC Goa. Their first semifinal leg against FC Goa at Fatorda ended in a 2–2 draw. The second leg ended in a goalless draw. In the shootout, they beat FC Goa 6–5, where Rowllin Borges scored the decisive penalty. In their final against ATK Mohun Bagan at the Fatorda Stadium, they won the game 2–1, with Bipin Singh scoring the decisive goal in the 90th minute. Thus, Mumbai City became the first club to win the League Winners' Shield and the ISL Trophy in the same season.

=== Des Buckingham era (2021–2023) ===

Air Force Club 1-2 Mumbai City FC 2022 AFC Champions League Group B - Matchday 2 lineup

==== 2021–22 season ====
On 8 October 2021, Mumbai City appointed English Des Buckingham as head coach on a two-year contract. The club began its 2021–22 season campaign with a 3–0 win on 22 November against FC Goa. At the end of the season, Mumbai City finished in fifth place, meaning they failed to qualify for the playoffs.

Ahead of the continental campaign, the club went to Abu Dhabi and defeated Emirati giants Al Ain 2–1 in a friendly match. Under Buckingham, Mumbai City became the first Indian club to win a match in the AFC Champions League, as they defeated Al-Quwa Al-Jawiya of Iraq by 2–1.

==== 2022–23 season ====
On 4 January 2023, Mumbai City extended Buckingham's contract for 2 years. The club made a historic run at 2022–23 Indian Super League by becoming League winners for the second time. They broke records with the most points (46), most wins (14), least defeats (2), most goals scored (54), goal difference (+33), and longest unbeaten streak (18 matches). However, they were beaten in the last two league games, followed by a third defeat to Bengaluru in the 1st leg of the semifinals. Although they defeated them in the 2nd leg with a scoreline of 1–2 in regulation time, they lost on penalties.

==== 2023–24 season ====
The club began the 23–24 season with the 2023 Durand Cup, where Mumbai were drawn in a group with Jamshedpur FC, Mohammedan SC, and the Indian Navy football team. Mumbai went on to win all three games, but ended up losing in the quarter-final to Mohun Bagan SG on 28 August. Mumbai's next match came in the 2023–24 AFC Champions League against F.C. Nassaji Mazandaran on 18 September 2023, where Mumbai were defeated 2–0. Mumbai played their first ISL match on 24 September away against NorthEast, winning 2–1 with Jorge Pereyra Díaz securing the win.

Mumbai's first home match of the season came against Kerala Blasters, with Mumbai winning 2-1 with goals from Pereyra Díaz and Apuia. Buckingham's last match as Mumbai coach came on 6 November, in a 2–0 loss at home to Saudi club Al-Hilal. Ten days later, Mumbai confirmed Buckingham had departed the club to join Oxford United.

=== Petr Krátký era (2023–2026) ===

2024 Indian Super League final Lineup

==== 2023–24 season ====
On 9 December 2023, Petr Krátký was appointed as the new head coach. His first game ended in a 0–0 draw away to FC Goa on 12 December 2023. His first win came on 20 December, a 2–1 win over Mohun Bagan SG, which included 11 yellow and seven red cards. Going into the final league match against second-placed Mohun Bagan, Mumbai were two points clear at the top of the table and only needed a draw to win the ISL Shield. However, Mumbai lost 2-1, allowing Mohun Bagan to lift the trophy.

Going into the ISL playoffs, Mumbai pulled off a late comeback against Goa in the semifinal first leg to win 2-3, with all three of Mumbai's goals coming after the 90th minute. A 2-0 win in the second leg meant Mumbai had reached the ISL Final. In the final, Mumbai took revenge against Mohun Bagan, winning 3-1 with goals from Jorge Pereyra Díaz, Bipin Singh, and Jakub Vojtuš. This secured the second ISL Cup in the club's history.

==== 2024–25 season ====
The club opted to conduct the squad's pre-season training in Thailand, therefore the 2024 Durand Cup was subsequently contested by the Mumbai City youth team. The first match of the new season was away against Mohun Bagan SG on 13 September, which eventually ended in a 2-2 draw with goals from Tiri and Thaer Krouma. In the club's next match, away against Jamshedpur, despite going 1-0 up following a long-range goal from Nikos Karelis, Mumbai eventually lost 3-2. The early winless streak continued, with a 0-0 draw at home against Bengaluru. The club finally got their first win away against Goa, with goals from Nikos Karelis and Yoëll van Nieff.

On 7 February 2025, after a 0-2 win away against NorthEast United, Mumbai became the first team to achieve 100 Indian Super League wins. At the end of the league stage of the season, Mumbai City finished 6th with 36 points, qualifying for the playoffs. However, their playoff run ended in the knockout round with a 5–0 defeat to Bengaluru, one of the heaviest losses in ISL playoff history. Nikolaos Karelis finished as the club’s top scorer with 11 goals. Young full-back Nathan Rodrigues, given his debut and regular game time due to Akash Mishra's unavailability, emerged as a breakthrough player, recording 3 goals. In the 2025 Super Cup, Mumbai City reached the semi-final but were knocked out by Jamshedpur.

==== 2025–26 season and CFG exit ====
Mumbai City did not participate in the 2025 Durand Cup. After a period of uncertainty, Mumbai City confirmed their participation in the Super Cup. They were confirmed to be in pot A of the Super Cup draw. The club was drawn in Group D alongside SC Delhi, Rajasthan United, and Kerala Blasters. Mumbai won their first match 4-1 against Delhi, but lost 1-0 against Rajasthan United. Mumbai then defeated Kerala Blasters 1-0 to secure their berth on head-to-head record. However, the club lost 2-1 to Goa in the semi-final.

After a commercial review, City Football Group announced the divesting of its shares. This meant a return of complete ownership to the founding owners. In the shortened 13-game season, Mumbai secured a third-place finish, behind eventual champions East Bengal, and defending champions Mohun Bagan. Kratky left the club at the end of the season following the expiry of his contract.

=== Manolo Marquez era (2026) ===
==== 2026–27 season ====
On 18 July 2026, following the departure of Petr Kratky, Mumbai City announced the appointment of Spaniard Manolo Márquez as the club's new head coach. Soon after, the club opted against taking part in the 2026 Durand Cup.

On 6 November 2026, following a four-game winless start to the season, the club announced they and Márquez had agreed to part ways.

=== Ashvir Singh Johal era ===
On 14 November 2026, following Márquez's departure, the club announced the appointment of Englishman Ashvir Singh Johal as the club's new head coach.

== Club crest and kits ==
=== Club crest ===
Mumbai City FC crest (2014–23)

When the club was founded in 2014, the club crest predominantly featured a fortress representing the resilience of the city, seven stars to represent the Seven Islands of Bombay, and the Mumbai local train.

In 2023, three years after their takeover in 2020 by the City Football Group, the club redesigned their crest. The new crest was made in collaboration with the fans, who voted on a new design featuring iconic landmarks of Mumbai. The final crest chosen was a circular crest resembling other CFG teams, featuring the Bandra-Worli Sea Link, the Mumbai train network, the Arabian Sea, and two fortresses to symbolize the city's resilience.

=== Colours ===
When the club was founded in 2014, the main club colour was royal blue. In 2020, when the City Football Group purchased the club's majority share, they changed the primary colours into sky blue following the pathway of their flagship club Manchester City.

In the early years, the club's away kit was a white kit with royal blue featuring on the collar and sleeves. In 2018, the club changed the away colors into an all golden yellow kit.

=== Kit manufacturers and shirt sponsors ===
Period	Kit manufacturer	Main Shirt sponsor	Back sponsor
2014–15		Jabong.com	IDBI Bank
2015–16	Puma	Ace Group	UltraTech Cement
2016–17	Puma	Ace Group	
2017–18	T10 Sports	Ace Group	Infinix Mobile
2018–19	Sqad Gear	Ace Group	
2019–20	Sqad Gear	SportsAdda	
2020–21	Puma	DafaNews	Etihad Airways
2021–22	Puma	Expo 2020	DafaNews
2022–23	Puma	Stake News	
2023–24	Puma	Stake News	Cliky
2024–25	Puma	Etihad Airways	DafaNews
2025–26	Puma	Etihad Airways	ISGL
2026–27	Puma		ISGL

=== Kit evolution ===
2014–15	2015–16	2016–20	2020–21	2021–22	2022–23	2023–24	2024–26

== Stadium ==
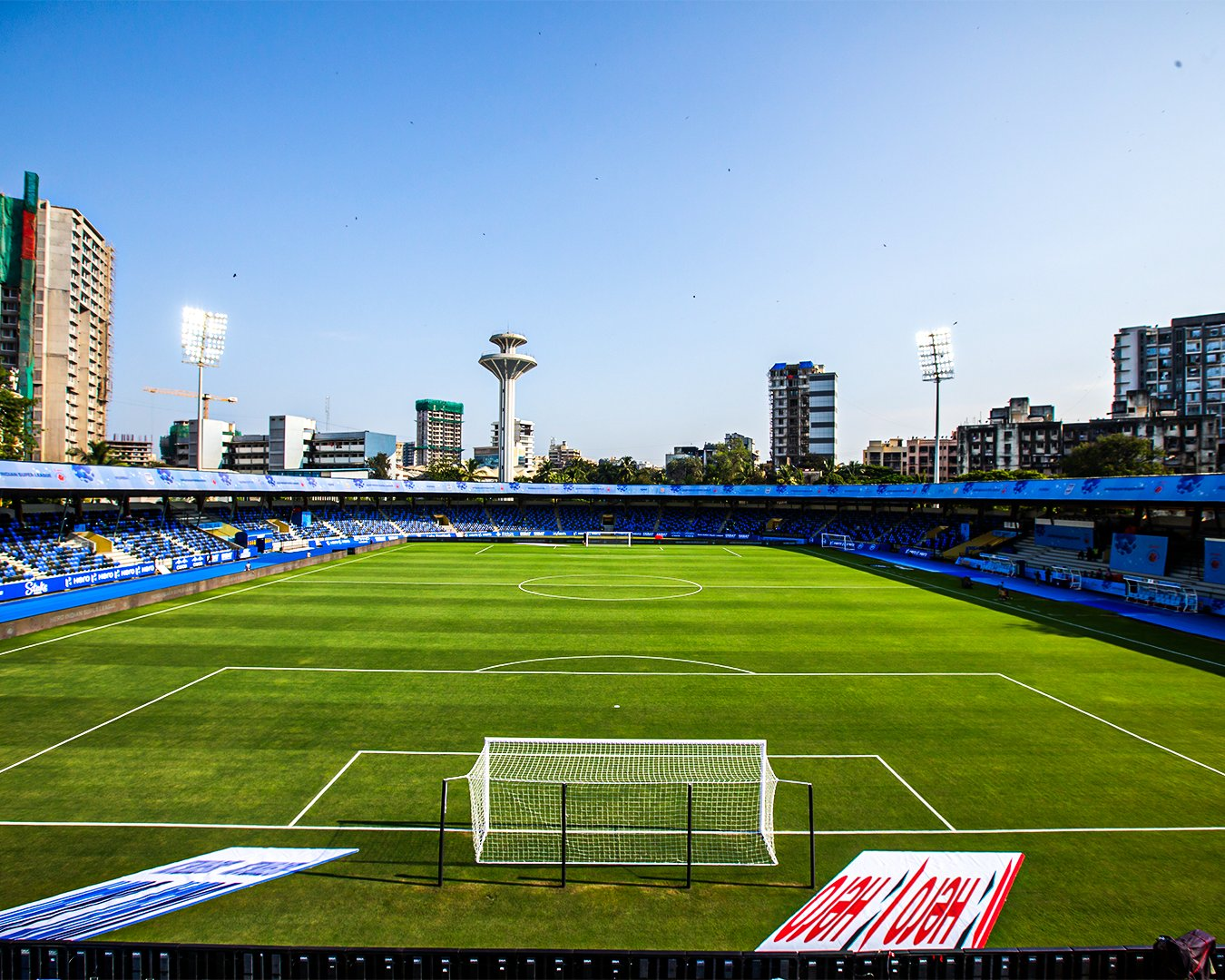
Mumbai Football Arena, on an ISL matchday in 2022

The Islanders played their home games at the DY Patil Stadium in Navi Mumbai in the first 2 seasons. They shifted their home base to the Mumbai Football Arena in Andheri from the third season of the ISL, as their previous home stadium, the DY Patil Stadium, was allotted to go under construction for 2017 FIFA U-17 World Cup, and have continued playing there ever since.

Mumbai also used the Balewadi Stadium in Pune, and the aforementioned DY Patil Stadium to play their 2023–24 AFC Champions League home games. This was since the infrastructural set up in the Mumbai Football Arena made it ineligible to host AFC Champions League matches.

== Supporters ==
Mumbai City FC is reputed to have one of India's most vocal fan bases. The West Coast Brigade is one of the notable fan club of Mumbai City FC, which is known for its support to the team at both home and away matches. West Coast Brigade has a dedicated stand during the home matches at the Mumbai Football Arena.

The players and the coach have often acknowledged the fans' support of the success and always engaged in fan interaction and promotional activities. In 2017, Mumbai City FC became the first club in ISL history to announce a special section for away fans as a progressive step toward football fan culture.

== Rivalries ==
=== West Coast Derby ===
Mumbai City has a rivalry with their neighborhood club FC Goa, against whom they contest the West Coast Derby or western rivalry. The root of the rivalry between Mumbai City FC and FC Goa can be traced back since the appointment of Jorge Costa as Mumbai City's head coach in 2018. There were traces of the rivalry before, but it started gaining momentum once the Portuguese – a Jose Mourinho ideologist, was appointed. It was natural that Sergio Lobera, whose philosophy is based on Pep Guardiola's Barcelona, would rise as one of the main threats to the Islanders. The two sides played several interesting battles throughout the 2018–19 and 2019–20 campaigns.

Mumbai City's three worst losses in Hero ISL history have come from FC Goa's hands. A 7–0 loss in November 2015, A 5–0 loss in October 2018, and a 5–1 loss in March 2019.

But there is more to this rivalry than just on-field results. Before the start of 2020–21 season, Mumbai City FC, under new ownership of CFG, raided FC Goa and signed five key players from the Gaurs in Ahmed Jahouh, Mourtada Fall, Hugo Boumous, Mandar Rao Dessai and Amey Ranawade. The Islanders also roped in head coach Sergio Lobera, who had been sacked by Goa just a season before adding more spice to the rivalry.

In the 2023-24 season, Mumbai faced Goa in the ISL semi-final playoff. In the first leg, Goa were winning 2-0 until the 90th minute, where Lallianzuala Chhangte scored a brace, and Vikram Partap Singh scored once, to secure a 2-3 comeback. Mumbai midfielder Jayesh Rane played a crucial part in the win, assisting two out of the three Mumbai goals.

=== Rivalry with Mohun Bagan ===
Mumbai City have also developed a competitive rivalry with Mohun Bagan SG, with the sides considered to be two of the strongest teams in the league. The 2023-24 season saw the rivalry increase, with Mumbai City and Mohun Bagan battling each other for both the ISL Championship and the ISL Cup. Mohun Bagan won the ISL shield, beating Mumbai on the final day. In the ISL Final, Mumbai avenged the loss and secured a 3-1 win.

Ahead of the 2024-25 season, Mohun Bagan made headlines by signing Apuia, one of Mumbai's star players. Both clubs played out the first match of the 2024-25 season, ending in a 2-2 draw with Mumbai's Syrian defender Thaer Krouma scoring a last-minute equalizer.

== Ownership ==
On 13 April 2014, ISL announced that actor Ranbir Kapoor had won the bidding for the Mumbai team to be the eighth team in the inaugural season of the League with Bimal Parekh as co-owner.

=== City Football Group ===
On 28 November 2019, it was revealed that City Football Group, a subsidiary of Abu Dhabi United Group, had bought a 65% stake in the club, adding Mumbai City FC as the eighth club under the City Group. On 26 December 2025, the City Group divested their stake in the club, returning it to the founding owners.

== Players ==
=== First-team squad ===
As of 12 November 2026

Note: Flags indicate national team as defined under FIFA eligibility rules; some limited exceptions apply. Players may hold more than one non-FIFA nationality.

No.	Pos.	Nation	Player
2	DF	IND	Dhruv Alva
3	DF	IND	Valpuia (4th captain)
4	DF	SRB	Lazar Ćirković
5	DF	ESP	Carlos Delgado (vice-captain)
6	FW	IND	Vikram Partap Singh
7	FW	IND	Farukh Choudhary
8	MF	ESP	Sergio Llamas
9	FW	COL	Wilmar Jordán Gil
10	MF	IND	Brandon Fernandes (3rd captain)
11	MF	BRA	Hadrian dos Santos
14	MF	IND	Lalnuntluanga Bawitlung
16	MF	IND	Franklin Nazareth
17	DF	IND	Bijay Chhetri
18	DF	IND	Amandeep
19	MF	IND	Hridaya Jain
20	FW	URU	Leandro Otormín

No.	Pos.	Nation	Player
21	MF	IND	Ishaan Shishodia
22	FW	IND	Muhammad Ajsal
23	GK	IND	Rehenesh TP
24	MF	IND	Supratim Das
27	DF	IND	Nathan Rodrigues
31	DF	IND	Akash Mishra (Captain)
32	GK	IND	Ahan Prakash
36	DF	IND	Sahil Panwar
39	MF	IND	Aadil Sheikh
45	MF	IND	Zothanpuia
49	FW	IND	Yuvraj Kadam
89	GK	IND	Ashish Sibi
92	FW	IND	Noufal PN
99	FW	SLO	Luka Majcen
—	DF	IND	Steiner D'Souza
—	GK	IND	Harsh Kadam

== Reserves and academy ==
Mumbai City fielded a reserve team in the 2019–20 I-League 2nd Division. Players like Mohammed Kaif and Nakul Shelke were promoted to the first team for the Super Cup after their performances in the 2nd Division. In late November 2019, academy graduate Asif Khan signed his first professional contract with Mumbai City until 2024, making him the first Mumbai City academy player to sign a professional contract with the club.

Ahead of the 2024–25 season, with the club opting to conduct pre-season training in Thailand, the reserves contested the 2024 Durand Cup. However, the team lost all three matches, and were knocked out in the group stage.

== Personnel ==
=== Corporate ===
Position	Name
Owner(s)	(India) Ranbir Kapoor (50%) (India) Bimal Parekh (50%)
Board of directors	(India) Bimal Parekh (India) Sneha Parekh
CEO	(India) Kandarp Chandra
Head of corporate sales	(India) Jonathan Rego
Marketing manager	(India) Siddharth Yadav
Finance manager	(India) Megha Srivastava

=== Technical ===
Position	Name
Head coach	(England) Ashvir Singh Johal
Assistant coach	(India) Anthony Fernandes
Director of football	(India) Sujay Sharma
Team manager	(India) Rocky Kalan
Goalkeeping coach	(Serbia) Milos Petrovic
Strength & conditioning coach	(India) Jeriah Prasad
Performance analyst	(India) Narendra Vakare
Performance analyst	(India) Trishit Ghosh
Physiotherapist	(India) Suhas Kandekar
Physiotherapist	(India) Akhilesh
Team doctor	(India) Simarpreet Singh Kalra
Head of rehabilitation and sports medicine	(India) Sandeep Kurale
Media manager	(India) Swati Kalyadapu
Kit manager	(India) Rishi Roy
Head of youth and grassroots development	(India) Dinesh Nair

== Statistics and records ==
=== All-time performance record ===
As of 25th August 2024

Competition	MP	W	D	L	GF	GA	Win%
Indian Super League	190	92	43	55	304	239	48.42
Super Cup	10	6	0	4	13	12	60.00
Durand Cup	14	7	1	6	33	29	50.00
AFC Champions League	12	2	1	9	4	28	16.67
Total	226	107	45	74	354	308	47.35

=== Managerial ===
As of 30th April 2025

Name	Nationality	From	To	P	W	D	L	GF	GA	Win%
Peter Reid	England	4 September 2014	2014	14	4	4	6	12	21	28.57
Nicolas Anelka	France	3 July 2015	2015	14	4	4	6	16	26	28.57
Alexandre Guimarães	Costa Rica	19 April 2016	2018	34	13	8	13	43	37	38.24
Jorge Costa	Portugal	14 August 2018	2020	38	17	8	13	52	26	44.74
Sergio Lobera	Spain	12 October 2020	2021	23	14	5	4	39	21	60.87
Des Buckingham	England	8 October 2021	16 November 2023	72	39	12	21	144	104	54.17
Anthony Fernandes (interim)	India	28 November 2023	8 December 2023	3	1	0	2	5	4	33.33
Petr Krátký	Czech Republic	9 December 2023	18 July 2026	68	36	16	16	100	67	52.94
Manolo Márquez	Spain	18 July 2026	6 November 2026	4	0	2	2	4	6	0.00
Ashvir Singh Johal	England	11 November 2026	Present	0	0	0	0	0	0	—

== Honours ==
=== Domestic ===
- ISL League Shield
  - Winners (2): 2020–21, 2022–23
- ISL Cup
  - Winners (2): 2020–21, 2023–24

== Continental record ==
Season	Competition	Round	Club	Home	Away	Position
2022	AFC Champions League	Group stage	(Saudi Arabia) Al-Shabab	0–3	0–6	2nd (in Group B)
2022	AFC Champions League	Group stage	(Iraq) Al-Quwa Al-Jawiya	1–0	2–1	2nd (in Group B)
2022	AFC Champions League	Group stage	(United Arab Emirates) Al Jazira	0–0	0–1	2nd (in Group B)
2023–24	AFC Champions League	Group stage	(Iran) Nassaji Mazandaran	0–2	0–2	4th (in Group D)
2023–24	AFC Champions League	Group stage	(Uzbekistan) Navbahor	1–2	0–3	4th (in Group D)
2023–24	AFC Champions League	Group stage	(Saudi Arabia) Al Hilal	0–2	0–6	4th (in Group D)

=== Statistics by AFC competitions ===
Competition	Apps	Pld	W	L	D	GF	GA	GD	Win%
Champions League Elite	2	12	2	9	1	4	28	–24	16.66%
Total	2	12	2	1	9	4	28	–24	16.66%

== See also ==
- List of football clubs in India
- 2026 SAFF Club Championship

== Notes ==
1. All group-stage games were played in Saudi Arabia due to COVID-19 pandemic.
