= Jayesh Rane =

Indian footballer (born 1993)

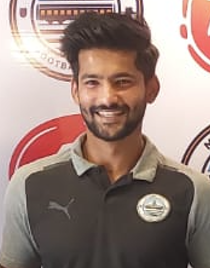
- Jayesh with Mumbai City in 2023

Personal information
- Full name: Jayesh Dilip Rane
- Date of birth: 20 February 1993 (age 33)
- Place of birth: Mumbai, India
- Height: 1.73 m (5 ft 8 in)
- Position: Midfielder

Youth career
- 2008–2012: Mumbai

Senior career*
Years	Team	Apps	(Gls)
2012–2016	Mumbai	64	(4)
2014–2015	→ Chennaiyin (loan)	12	(0)
2016–2017	→ Chennaiyin (loan)	8	(1)
2017	→ Aizawl (loan)	18	(2)
2017–2020	ATK	49	(3)
2020–2021	Mohun Bagan	16	(0)
2021–2024	Bengaluru	18	(1)
2023–2024	→ Mumbai City (loan)	20	(0)
2024–2025	Mumbai City	21	(0)
2025	Jamshedpur	0	(0)
2026	Inter Kashi	6	(0)
2026–	Samaleswari	1	(0)

International career^{‡}
2015–2016	India U23	6	(1)
- * Club domestic league appearances and goals as of 11:33, 8 November 2026 (UTC) ‡ National team caps and goals as of 10 March 2020

Jayesh Dilip Rane (born 20 February 1993) is an Indian professional footballer who plays as a midfielder for Indian Football League club Samaleswari.

== Club career ==
=== Mumbai ===
Born in Mumbai, Maharashtra, Rane joined the Mumbai youth team in 2008. During the 2012 I-League U20, Rane ended as the league top scorer with thirteen goals. Rane was then called up to the first-team for the Federation Cup but did not see the field during the tournament due to Mumbai being knocked-out early. Rane did eventually make his debut for Mumbai in the I-League on 3 November 2012 against Salgaocar. He came on as a 90th-minute substitute for Subhas Chakrobarty as Mumbai lost 1–0. Rane then scored his first professional goal for the club the next season on 18 October 2013, also against Salgaocar. His 85th-minute strike was the only one though for Mumbai as the club lost 3–1.

=== Chennaiyin ===
==== 2014 season ====
In July 2014, it was announced that Rane would be among 84 Indian players who would be a part of the 2014 ISL Inaugural Domestic Draft, being available on loan from Mumbai. On 23 July 2014, he was drafted in the ninth round of the draft by Chennaiyin. He made his debut for Chennaiyin on 25 October 2014 against Delhi Dynamos. He came on as a halftime substitute for Balwant Singh as Chennaiyin lost 3–1.

==== 2015 season ====
Rane returned to Chennaiyin for the 2015 season. On 20 December 2015, Rane came on as a 68th-minute substitute for Jeje Lalpekhlua in the 2015 Indian Super League final against Goa. In the end, Chennaiyin won the match 3–2, scoring two goals in stoppage time, to win the Indian Super League final.

==== 2016 season ====
The 2016 season began well for Rane. He started the club's first match of the season against the 2014 champions, Atlético de Kolkata, and he scored his first goal for the club which tied the match at the time 1–1. In the end, Chennaiyin could only come away from the match with a 2–2 draw. His performance during the match lead to Rane being named the "Emerging Player of the Match".

=== Aizawl FC (loan) ===
Following the appointment of former Mumbai FC head coach Khalid Jamil to Aizawl FC, Rane was signed by the club on loan from Mumbai FC for the 2016-17 I-League season, with the deal being confirmed on 5 January 2017. He made his debut for the club in a 1–1 draw away against East Bengal FC. He scored his first Aizawl FC goal in the Northeast Derby against Shillong Lajong, the eventual match-winning goal in the 63rd minute, sending the club to the top of the table.

The club stayed at the top of the table, eventually winning the I-League after a 1–1 draw against Shillong Lajong in the final game of the season. This was a momentous occasion not just for the club, but for the entire region, as Aizawl became the first club from the north-east to win the I-League title. Rane was a key part of the team, playing every game of the season either in midfield, or out wide as a winger.

=== ATK ===
Rane was bought by Atletico de Kolkata in the draft for the 2017 season in ISL. He played 13 games in the season without registering a goal or an assist. He signed a contract extension on 20 March 2018 with the club. On 2 December, in the match against Chennaiyin FC he scored his first goal for his club ATK.

=== Bengaluru FC ===
In July 2021, Rane moved to Bengaluru FC and debuted on 15 August in a 1–0 win over Maldivian side Club Eagles, in 2021 AFC Cup playoffs. In that match, he scored the winner.

==== Mumbai City (loan) ====
On 22 July 2023, Rane joined Mumbai City on a season-long loan. Coincidentally, this was his second stint at a Mumbai-based club, having made 64 appearances for the now-defunct Mumbai FC. He made his debut for Mumbai away versus Odisha FC, in a thrilling 2–2 draw as a 74th-minute substitute for Vinit Rai. He got his first assist for Mumbai City in the club's determined 2-1 fightback victory at home versus Punjab FC, laying the ball off to Greg Stewart, who scored from long range. He also played a brilliant through ball to Lallianzuala Chhangte after the ball was won back from Punjab's kick-off, who then passed to Jorge Pereyra Diaz, who scored the go-ahead goal, and what was eventually the winning goal. Both goals were scored within a remarkable 52 seconds of each other, with Stewart's strike coming at 81:03, and Diaz's finish going into the net at 81:55.

He made his first AFC Champions League appearance of his career away against Al-Hilal SFC as an 80th-minute substitute for Jorge Pereyra Diaz, in an eventual 6–0 loss for The Islanders.

The crowning moment of Rane's stint came during the first leg of ISL Playoff semi-final away against FC Goa. Coming on as a substitute in the 64th minute with Mumbai 2–0 down, Jayesh assisted Lallianzuala Chhangte twice, in the 90th minute and the 96th minute, as Mumbai came back to win 2–3. After a 2–0 win in the second leg at home, Mumbai played against Mohun Bagan SG in the ISL final, where they won 3–1. Jayesh started the game, eventually coming off in the 76th minute for Vinit Rai.

This win secured him the record of becoming the only Indian footballer to win the ISL trophy with three different teams, following his wins with Chennaiyin FC in the 2015 season, and with ATK in 2019–20 season.

=== Mumbai City ===
On 20 June 2024, Mumbai City FC announced that Jayesh Rane had joined the club permanently on a one-year deal, following the expiry of his Bengaluru FC contract.

== International career ==
In March 2015, Rane was called up to the India under-23 side which would take part in the 2016 AFC U-23 Championship qualifiers. Rane made his international debut with the side on 27 March 2016 against Uzbekistan U23. He started the match and played the full 90 minutes as India lost 2–0.

== Career statistics ==
=== Club ===
As of 17 August 2025

Club	Season	League			Cup		AFC		Total	
Club	Season	Division	Apps	Goals	Apps	Goals	Apps	Goals	Apps	Goals
Mumbai	2012–13	I-League	18	0	0	0	—		18	0
Mumbai	2013–14	I-League	17	1	1 (Note: Appearance(s) in Federation Cup)	0	—		18	1
Mumbai	2014–15	I-League	16	1	4	0	—		20	1
Mumbai	2015–16	I-League	13	2	2	0	—		15	2
Mumbai	Total		64	4	7	0	0	0	71	4
Chennaiyin (loan)	2014	Indian Super League	5	0	0	0	—		5	0
Chennaiyin (loan)	2015	Indian Super League	7	0	0	0	—		7	0
Chennaiyin	2016	Indian Super League	8	1	0	0	—		8	1
Chennaiyin	Total		20	1	0	0	0	0	20	1
Aizawl (loan)	2016–17	I-League	18	2	3	0	—		21	2
ATK	2017–18	Indian Super League	13	0	0	0	—		13	0
ATK	2018–19	Indian Super League	18	2	3 (Note: Appearance(s) in Super Cup)	0	—		21	2
ATK	2019–20	Indian Super League	18	1	0	0	—		18	1
ATK	Total		49	3	3	0	0	0	52	3
Mohun Bagan	2020–21	Indian Super League	16	0	0	0	—		14	0
Bengaluru	2021–22	Indian Super League	9	1	0	0	4 (Note: Appearance(s) in AFC Cup)	1	13	2
Bengaluru	2022–23	Indian Super League	9	0	8 (Note: Appearance(s) in Durand Cup)	1	—		17	1
Bengaluru	Total		18	1	8	1	4	1	30	3
Mumbai City (loan)	2023–24	Indian Super League	20	0	4	0	3 (Note: Appearance(s) in AFC Champions League)	0	27	0
Mumbai City	2024–25	Indian Super League	21	0	0	0	—		21	0
Jamshedpur	2025–26	Indian Super League	0	0	4	0	—		4	0
Inter Kashi	2025-26	Indian Super League	0	0	0	0	—		0	0
Career total			226	11	29	1	7	1	262	13

== Honours ==
Aizawl

- I-League: 2016–17

Chennaiyin

- Indian Super League: 2015

ATK

- Indian Super League: 2019–20

- Durand Cup: 2022
- Super Cup runner-up: 2023

Mumbai City FC

- Indian Super League: 2023–24

India U23

- South Asian Games Silver medal: 2016

Individual

- FPAI Fans Player of the Year: 2015
