= Tiri (footballer) =

Spanish footballer

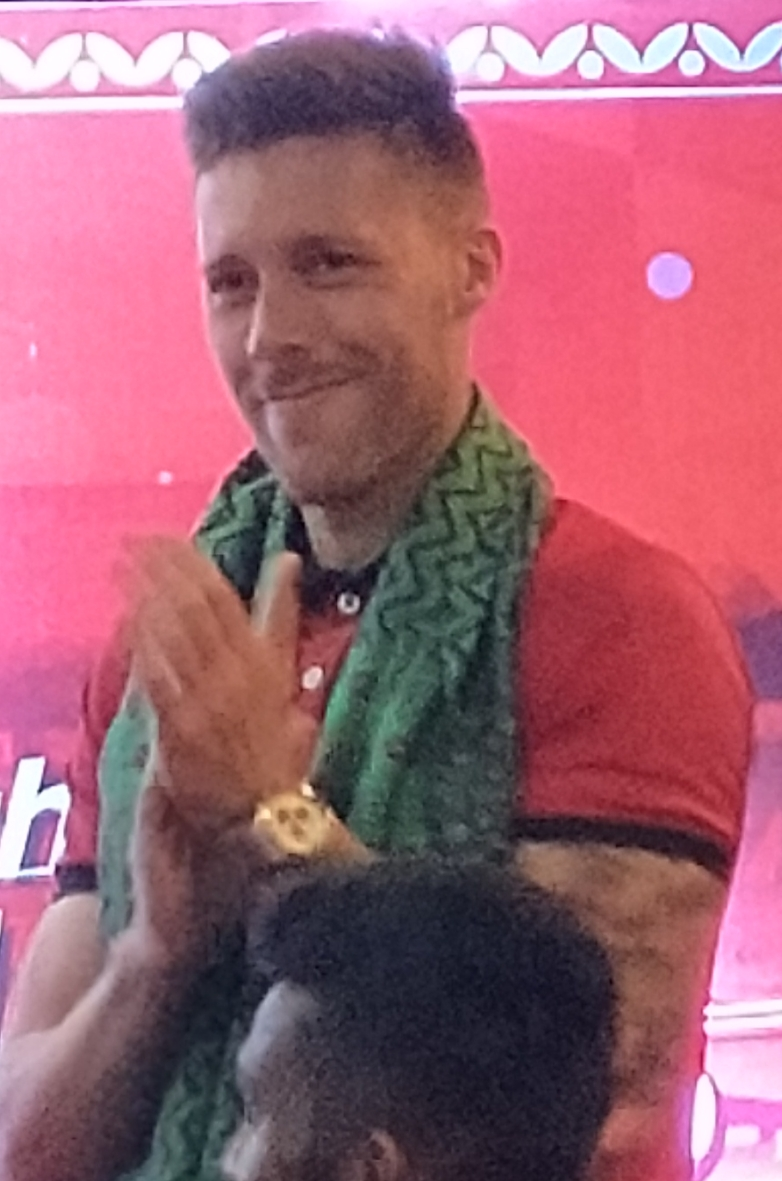
- Tiri in 2019

Personal information
- Full name: José Luis Espinosa Arroyo
- Date of birth: 14 July 1991 (age 35)
- Place of birth: Los Barrios, Spain
- Height: 1.86 m (6 ft 1 in)
- Position: Centre-back

Team information
- Current team: Persijap Jepara
- Number: 4

Youth career
- Cádiz

Senior career*
Years	Team	Apps	(Gls)
2009–2012	Cádiz B	49	(0)
2009–2010	Cádiz	1	(0)
2012–2015	Atlético Madrid B	83	(0)
2015	ATK	13	(0)
2016	Atlético Madrid B	9	(0)
2016	ATK	11	(0)
2017	Marbella	6	(0)
2017–2020	Jamshedpur	48	(3)
2020–2023	ATK Mohun Bagan	38	(0)
2023–2025	Mumbai City	44	(2)
2026–	Persijap Jepara	20	(0)
- * Club domestic league appearances and goals as of 22:00, 7 November 2026 (UTC)

José Luis Espinosa Arroyo (born 14 July 1991), commonly known as Tiri, is a Spanish professional footballer who plays as a centre-back for Super League club Persijap Jepara.

He never played any higher than Segunda División B in his own country, where he made 90 appearances for three clubs. He played 154 matches in the Indian Super League for ATK, Jamshedpur, ATK Mohun Bagan and Mumbai City, winning the title with the first team in 2016 and the fourth in 2023–24 and being at one point the most-capped foreign player in the history of the competition.

== Club career ==
=== Cádiz ===
Born in Los Barrios, Province of Cádiz, Tiri began his career at Cádiz CF. He was mostly associated to the reserves during his spell and only collected two first-team appearances, the first occurring on 10 May 2009 at the age of 17 as he played the final 25 minutes of a 2–1 Segunda División B away win against CD Guadalajara.

On 1 September 2010, Tiri played the full 90 minutes of a 3–1 home defeat of CE L'Hospitalet in the first round of the Copa del Rey, at the Estadio Ramón de Carranza.

=== Atlético Madrid ===
Tiri transferred to Atlético Madrid in 2012, being assigned to their B side also in the third tier. He was first choice during his three-year spell, being relegated to Tercera División in his last season.

=== ATK ===
On 18 June 2015, Tiri signed for Indian Super League defending champions ATK at the same time as compatriot Jaime Gavilán, joining Borja Fernández and Josemi in the club's Spanish contingent. An unused substitute for their first two matches of the campaign, he made his debut on 7 October by playing the entirety of a 1–1 draw at FC Goa in place of Arnab Mondal, who was away playing internationally for India.

Tiri totalled 1,170 minutes of action, in an eventual elimination in the semi-finals by Chennaiyin FC.

=== Return to Atlético B ===
Tiri returned to Atlético Madrid and its B team on 1 February 2016. However, before playing a game for them, on 16 March he agreed terms to go back to Kolkata for the next season.

=== ATK return ===
Tiri played 11 matches in his second spell at the Salt Lake Stadium. One of those was in the ISL final, a penalty shootout victory over Kerala Blasters FC on 18 December 2016, thus winning his first league title.

=== Marbella ===
On 24 January 2017, Tiri returned to Spain's third division, signing with Marbella FC in his native Andalusia. In the second of his six appearances, he was sent off in a 2–1 home loss to Lorca FC.

=== Jamshedpur ===
Tiri returned to the Indian top flight in July 2017, joining expansion team Jamshedpur FC. He played every minute as they finished fifth, one place off the playoffs, and scored in a 3–2 home win against Delhi Dynamos FC on 21 January 2018.

=== ATK Mohun Bagan ===
On 12 September 2020, Tiri moved to newly merged ATK Mohun Bagan FC. He made his official debut on 20 November, in a 1–0 away defeat of Kerala Blasters.

Tiri missed the vast majority of the 2022–23 campaign, due to injury.

=== Mumbai City ===
On 6 July 2023, Tiri signed a one-year contract with Mumbai City FC as a free agent. He scored his first goal on 4 February 2024 against his former club Jamshedpur, heading from a free kick in a 2–3 home loss. He won his second league title at the end of the season.

On 7 February 2025, away against NorthEast United FC, Tiri made his 150th ISL appearance, becoming the second foreigner to achieve this after Morocco's Ahmed Jahouh. In June, he agreed to a one-year extension.

Tiri left in January 2026, by mutual consent.

== Career statistics ==
As of 7 November 2026

Club	Season	League			Cup		Other		Total	
Club	Season	Division	Apps	Goals	Apps	Goals	Apps	Goals	Apps	Goals
Cádiz B	2009–10	Tercera División	13	0	—		—		13	0
Cádiz B	2010–11	Tercera División	9	0	—		—		9	0
Cádiz B	2011–12	Tercera División	26	0	—		—		26	0
Cádiz B	Total		48	0	—		—		48	0
Cádiz	2009–10	Segunda División B	1	0	—		—		1	0
Cádiz	2010–11	Segunda División B	0	0	1	0	—		1	0
Cádiz	Total		1	0	1	0	—		2	0
Atlético Madrid B	2012–13	Segunda División B	29	0	—		—		23	1
Atlético Madrid B	2013–14	Segunda División B	25	0	—		2 (Note: Appearances in Segunda División B relegation play-offs)	0	27	0
Atlético Madrid B	2014–15	Segunda División B	29	0	—		—		29	0
Atlético Madrid B	Total		83	0	—		2	0	85	0
ATK	2015	Indian Super League	13	0	—		—		13	0
Atlético Madrid B	2015–16	Tercera División	9	0	—		—		9	0
ATK	2016	Indian Super League	11	0	—		—		11	0
Marbella	2016–17	Segunda División B	6	0	—		—		6	0
Jamshedpur	2017–18	Indian Super League	18	1	—		—		18	1
Jamshedpur	2018–19	Indian Super League	18	1	—		—		18	1
Jamshedpur	2019–20	Indian Super League	12	1	—		—		12	1
Jamshedpur	Total		48	3	—		—		48	3
ATK Mohun Bagan	2020–21	Indian Super League	21	0	—		—		21	0
ATK Mohun Bagan	2021–22	Indian Super League	17	0	—		—		17	0
ATK Mohun Bagan	2022–23	Indian Super League	0	0	2 (Note: Appearances in Super Cup)	0	—		2	0
ATK Mohun Bagan	Total		38	0	2	0	—		40	0
Mumbai City	2023–24	Indian Super League	23	1	—		5 (Note: Appearances in AFC Champions League)	0	28	1
Mumbai City	2024–25	Indian Super League	21	1	—		—		21	1
Mumbai City	Total		44	2	0	0	5	0	49	2
Persijap Jepara	2025–26	Super League	15	0	—		—		15	0
Persijap Jepara	2026–27	Super League	5	0	—		—		5	0
Career total			321	5	3	0	7	0	331	5

== Honours ==
ATK

- Indian Super League: 2016

Mumbai City

- Indian Super League: 2023–24
