= Vikram Partap Singh =

Indian footballer (born 2002)

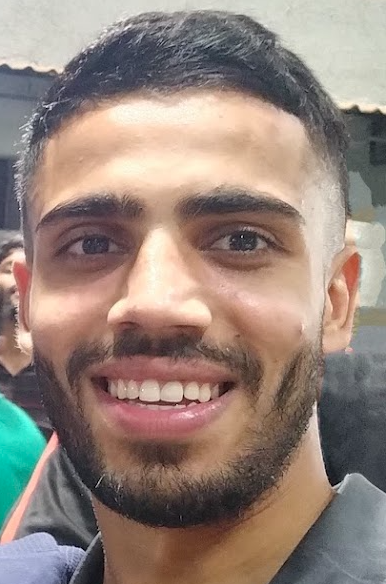
- Vikram with Mumbai City FC in 2023

Personal information
- Full name: Vikram Partap Singh Sandhu
- Date of birth: 16 January 2002 (age 24)
- Place of birth: Chandigarh, India
- Height: 1.73 m (5 ft 8 in)
- Position: Forward

Team information
- Current team: Mumbai City
- Number: 6

Youth career
- 2011–2017: Chandigarh Football Academy
- 2017–2018: Minerva Punjab

Senior career*
Years	Team	Apps	(Gls)
2018–2020	Indian Arrows	27	(5)
2020–	Mumbai City	98	(14)

International career^{‡}
2017–2018	India U17	33	(15)
2019–2021	India U20	14	(3)
2021	India U23	3	(1)
2024–	India	16	(1)
Medal record
Representing India
CAFA Nations Cup
Third place	2025 Tajikistan–Uzbekistan	Team
- * Club domestic league appearances and goals as of 16:50, 18 April 2026 (UTC) ‡ National team caps and goals as of 22:00, 3 October 2026 (UTC)

Vikram Partap Singh Sandhu (born 16 January 2002) is an Indian professional footballer who plays as a forward for Indian Super League club Mumbai City and the India national team.

== Club career ==
Vikram started his youth career at the Chandigarh Football Academy. He also had a brief stint with Minerva Punjab.

=== Indian Arrows ===
In 2018, Vikram joined I-League club Indian Arrows. He made his debut on 25 November 2018 in a 2–0 defeat against Real Kashmir in the I-League. He scored his first professional goal on 13 January 2019 in a 3–0 win over Shillong Lajong.

=== Mumbai City ===
On 14 October 2020, Indian Super League club Mumbai City announced the signing of Vikram on a three-year deal with an option to extend for a further year. On 20 December 2020, he made his debut in a 2–0 win against Hyderabad FC in the ISL, coming on as a substitute for Vignesh Dakshinamurthy in the 88th minute. On 1 December 2021, he scored his first goal for the club, a brace against ATK Mohun Bagan in their 5–1 win. He was later included in the club's 2022 AFC Champions League squad. On 19 January 2023, he played his 50th match for Mumbai City when he came on as 59th-minute substitute in a 4–0 win over NorthEast United.

On 7 June 2023, Vikram signed a contract extension with Mumbai City until 2026. On 28 October 2023, he started in his 50th ISL match against Hyderabad FC which was also his first start of the season, but it was cut short when he was substituted off in the 8th minute for Mohammad Nawaz after goalkeeper Phurba Lachenpa was sent off. On 18 February 2024, he scored his second league brace against Bengaluru FC in a 2–0 home win. On 2 March 2024, he won the February 2024 ISL Emerging Player of the Month award.

On 12 March 2024, Vikram scored his first ISL hat-trick in a 4–1 win against NorthEast United. This was the second hat-trick in the 2023-24 season after Daniel Chima Chukwu's hat-trick versus Hyderabad on 21 December 2023, and the first hat-trick by an Indian of the season. This hat-trick also made Vikram to become only the sixth Indian to score an Indian Super League hat-trick, and the second youngest player to do so, after Kiyan Nassiri's hat-trick versus East Bengal FC in the 21-22 ISL season.

== International career ==
=== Youth career ===
On 21 September 2018, Vikram scored for the India under-16s in the 2018 AFC U-16 Championship group stage match against Vietnam, securing the quarterfinal spot.

With the India under-20 team, Vikram took part in the 2019 OFC Youth Development Tournament held in Vanuatu, and they emerged champions as he scored twice in the tournament, including one in the final, to become top scorer.

On 24 October 2021, Vikram made his debut for the India under-23 team against Oman in the first match of the 2022 AFC U-23 Asian Cup qualification. He scored in the 37th minute to give India a 2–0 lead. India went on to win the match 2–1.

=== Senior career ===
In December 2023, Vikram was called up to the India senior squad for the 2023 AFC Asian Cup. He made his debut as an 89th-minute substitute against Australia on 13 January 2024, in their 2–0 defeat.

== Style of play ==
Vikram mainly plays as a winger, but he can play anywhere up front. He is known for his pace, ball control and defensive inputs as a winger.

== Career statistics ==
=== Club ===
As of match played 1 June 2025

Appearances and goals by club, season and competition
Club	Season	League			National cup (Note: Includes Super Cup)		AFC		Other		Total	
Club	Season	Division	Apps	Goals	Apps	Goals	Apps	Goals	Apps	Goals	Apps	Goals
Indian Arrows	2018–19	I-League	13	1	0	0	–		–		13	1
Indian Arrows	2019–20	I-League	14	4	0	0	–		–		14	4
Indian Arrows	Total		27	5	0	0	0	0	0	0	27	5
Mumbai City	2020–21	Indian Super League	11	0	0	0	–		–		11	0
Mumbai City	2021–22	Indian Super League	16	3	0	0	6 (Note: Appearances in AFC Champions League)	0	–		22	3
Mumbai City	2022–23	Indian Super League	19	2	3	0	–		5 (Note: Four appearances and two goals in Durand Cup, one appearance and one goal in Indian club qualifiers for 2023–24 AFC competitions)	3	27	5
Mumbai City	2023–24	Indian Super League	23	8	0	0	6	0	4 (Note: Appearances in Durand Cup)	1	33	9
Mumbai City	2024–25	Indian Super League	21	1	3	0	0	0	0	0	5	1
Mumbai City	Total		90	14	6	0	12	0	9	4	117	18
Career total			117	19	6	0	12	0	9	4	144	23

=== International ===
As of 3 October 2026

National team	Year	Apps	Goals
India	2024	5	0
India	2025	5	0
India	2026	6	1
Total		16	1

India score listed first, score column indicates score after each Singh goal

List of international goals scored by Vikram Partap Singh
No.	Date	Venue	Opponent	Score	Result	Competition
1.	9 June 2026	Hisor Central Stadium, Hisor, Tajikistan	Tajikistan	1–0	1–1	Friendly

== Honours ==
Mumbai City

- Indian Super League: 2020–21
- Indian Super League Winners' Shield: 2020–21, 2022–23
- ISL Cup: 2023–24
- Durand Cup runner-up: 2022

India U15

- SAFF U-15 Championship: 2017

India U20

- OFC Youth Development Tournament: 2019
- SAFF U-18 Championship: 2019

Individual

- Indian Super League Emerging Player of the League: 2023–24
- AIFF Emerging Player of the Year: 2021–22
- 2017 SAFF U-15 Championship Player of the tournament
- 2019 OFC Youth Development Tournament Top goalscorer
- Indian Super League Emerging Player of the League: February 2024, March 2024
