= 2024–25 Jamshedpur FC season =

Jamshedpur FC
2024–25 season
- Chairman: Chanakya Chaudhary
- Manager: Khalid Jamil
- Stadium: JRD Tata Sports Complex
- Indian Super League: 5th of 13, Playoffs: Semi-final
- Durand Cup: Group Stage
- Super Cup: Runners-up
- Average home league attendance: 14,284
Home colours	Away colours

The 2024–25 season is the 8th season in the history of Jamshedpur Football Club and the club's 8th consecutive season in the top flight of Indian football. In addition to the domestic league, Jamshedpur will compete in this season's editions of the Durand Cup and Super Cup. The season covers the period from 1 June 2024 to 31 May 2025.

== First team ==
=== First-team coaching staff ===
Position	Name	Nationality	Year appointed	Last club/team	References
Manager	Khalid Jamil	India	2023	Bengaluru United	
Assistant Coach	Steven Dias	India	2023	Jamshedpur B	
Goalkeeping Coach	Harshad Meher	India	2023	Real Kashmir (as goalkeeping coach)	

=== First-team squad ===
No.	Player	Nat.	Position(s) (Footedness)	Date of birth (age)	Signed		Transfer fee	Apps.	Goals
No.	Player	Nat.	Position(s) (Footedness)	Date of birth (age)	In	From	Transfer fee	Apps.	Goals
Goalkeepers
1	Rakshit Dagar	IND	GK (R)	16 October 1992 (age 34)	2022	(India) Gokulam Kerala	Free transfer	0	0
31	Vishal Yadav	IND	GK (R)	5 May 2002 (age 24)	2021	(India) Jamshedpur Reserves	Free transfer	13	0
Defenders
6	Ricky Lallawmawma	IND	LB (L)	9 September 1991 (age 35)	2020	(India) ATK	Free transfer	67	0
16	Muhammad Uvais	IND	LB / CB (L)	31 July 1998 (age 28)	2022	(India) Gokulam Kerala	Free transfer	7	0
21	Wungngayam Muirang^{*}	IND	CB (L)	16 February 1999 (age 27)	2023	(India) Bengaluru	Free transfer	0	0
24	Pratik Chaudhari	IND	CB (R)	4 October 1989 (age 37)	2022	(India) Bengaluru	Free transfer	22	1
44	Saphaba Singh Telem	IND	CB / LB (L)	3 January 2003 (age 23)	2021	(India) Jamshedpur Reserves	N/A	7	0
77	Nikhil Barla	IND	RB / ST (R)	5 August 2003 (age 23)	2021	(India) Jamshedpur Reserves	N/A	8	0
Midfielders
7	Len Doungel	IND	RM (R)	3 January 1994 (age 32)	2021	(India) Goa	Free transfer	40	2
8	Rei Tachikawa^{*}	JPN	CM (R)	18 January 1998 (age 28)	2023	(Malta) Sirens	Free transfer	1	0
14	Pronay Halder	IND	DM (R)	25 February 1993 (age 33)	2023	(India) Mohun Bagan SG	Free transfer	10	0
17	Imran Khan^{*}	IND	RM / CM (L)	1 March 1995 (age 31)	2023	(India) NorthEast United	Free transfer	1	0
27	Emil Benny^{*}	IND	CM / AM (R)	19 September 2000 (age 26)	2023	(India) NorthEast United	Free transfer	1	0
27	Sk Sahil^{†}	IND	CM (R)	28 April 2000 (age 26)	2022	(India) Mohun Bagan SG	Free transfer	4	0
28	Germanpreet Singh	IND	CM / DM (R)	24 June 1996 (age 30)	2022	(India) Chennaiyin	Free transfer	6	0
Attackers
11	Sanan Mohammed K^{*}	IND	LW (R)	5 April 2004 (age 22)	2023	(India) RFYC	Free transfer	2	0
18	Ritwik Das	IND	LW (R)	14 December 1996 (age 29)	2021	(India) Kerala Blasters	Free transfer	39	10
19	Semboi Haokip^{*}	IND	ST (R)	13 March 1993 (age 33)	2023	(India) East Bengal	Free transfer	1	0
30	Nongdamba Naorem^{*}	IND	LW (R)	2 January 2000 (age 26)	2023	(India) Mohun Bagan SG	Free transfer	1	0

=== New Contracts ===
Date	No.	Pos.	Nat.	Player	Contract Until	Ref.
26 June 2024	8	MF	(Japan)	Rei Tachikawa	2026	
01 July 2024	12	FW	(India)	Len Doungel	2025	
12 July 2024	77	FW	(India)	Nikhil Barla	2028	
19 July 2024	14	MF	(India)	Pronay Halder	2025	

== New contracts and transfers ==
=== Transfers in ===
Date	Pos.	Nat.	Player	Transferred from	Fee	Ref.
27 June 2024	GK	(India)	Amrit Gope	(India) Bengaluru	Free	
30 June 2024	MF	(India)	Sreekuttan VS	(India) Gokulam Kerala	Free	
04 July 2024	FW	(Spain)	Javier Siverio	(India) East Bengal	Free	
06 July 2024	FW	(Australia)	Jordan Murray	(India) Chennaiyin	Free	
13 July 2024	GK	(India)	Albino Gomes	(India) Sreenidi Deccan	Free	
16 July 2024	DF	(India)	Nishchal Chandan	(India) Churchill Brothers	Free transfer	
23 July 2024	DF	(Nigeria)	Stephen Eze	(Vietnam) Quang Nam	Free transfer	
25 July 2024	MF	(Spain)	Javi Hernández	(India) Bengaluru	Free	
26 July 2024	FW	(India)	Aniket Jadhav	(India) Odisha	Free	
26 July 2024	DF	(India)	Shubham Sarangi	(India) Odisha	Free	
27 July 2024	DF	(India)	Ashutosh Mehta		Free transfer	
27 July 2024	MF	(India)	Sourav Das	(India) Chennaiyin	Free	

=== Transfers out ===
Date	No.	Pos.	Nat.	Player	Transferred to	Fee	Ref.
3 June 2024	03	MF	(India)	Jitendra Singh	(India) Chennaiyin	Free transfer	
5 June 2024	91	DF	(Brazil)	Elsinho	(India) Chennaiyin	Free transfer	
7 June 2024	4	DF	(India)	Laldinpuia	(India) Chennaiyin	Free transfer	
9 June 2024	99	FW	(Nigeria)	Daniel Chima Chukwu	(India) Chennaiyin	Free transfer	
9 June 2024	32	GK	(Nigeria)	Rehenesh TP	(India) Mumbai City	Free transfer	
9 June 2024	10	MF	(France)	Jeremy Manzorro	(India) Mumbai City	Free transfer	
2 July 2024	12	DF	(India)	Provat Lakra	(India) Mumbai City	Free transfer	
29 July 2024	11	FW	(India)	Komal Thatal	(India) Chennaiyin	Free transfer	
29 July 2024	20	FW	(Serbia)	Alen Stevanović	TBD	Free transfer	

== Competitions ==
=== Overall record ===
Competition	First match	Last match	Starting round	Final position	Record							
Competition	First match	Last match	Starting round	Final position	Pld	W	D	L	GF	GA	GD	Win %
Indian Super League	TBD	TBD	Matchday 1	TBD	0	0	0	0	0	0	+0	—
Durand Cup	28 July 2024	TBD	Group stage	TBD	2	2	0	0	5	1	+4	100.00
Super Cup	TBD	TBD	TBD	TBD	0	0	0	0	0	0	+0	—
Total					2	2	0	0	5	1	+4	100.00

Source: Soccerway

=== Indian Super League ===
Pos	Team	Pld	W	D	L	GF	GA	GD	Pts	Qualification
3	Bengaluru	24	11	5	8	40	31	+9	38 (Note: Head-to-head points: Bengaluru 7, NorthEast 7, Jamshedpur 3; Head-to-head goal difference: Bengaluru +2, NorthEast -2.)	Qualification for the knockouts
4	NorthEast United	24	10	8	6	46	29	+17	38	Qualification for the knockouts
5	Jamshedpur	24	12	2	10	37	43	−6	38	Qualification for the knockouts
6	Mumbai City	24	9	9	6	29	28	+1	36	Qualification for the knockouts
7	Odisha	24	8	9	7	44	37	+7	33	

Source: ISL
Rules for classification: 1) points; 2) goal difference; 3) number of goals scored; 4) head-to-head points; 5) head-to-head goal difference; 6) head-to-head goals scored; 7) fair play ranking; 8) drawing of lots
(Note: Head-to-head record is used only after all the matches between the teams in question have been played).

=== Super Cup ===
Round of 16
20 April
8	Kerala Blasters	2
9	East Bengal	0
21 April
2	Goa	3
IL4	Gokulam Kerala	0
21 April
7	Odisha	0
10	Punjab	3
23 April
3	Bengaluru	1 (3)
IL2	Inter Kashi (p)	1 (5)
23 April
6	Mumbai City	4
11	Chennaiyin	0
24 April
4	Northeast United	6
13	Mohammedan	0
24 April
5	Jamshedpur	2
12	Hyderabad	0

Quarter-finals
26 April
8	Kerala Blasters	1
1	Mohun Bagan	2
26 April
2	Goa	2
10	Punjab	1
27 April
IL2	Inter Kashi	0
6	Mumbai City	1
27 April
4	Northeast United	0 (4)
5	Jamshedpur (p)	0 (5)

Semi-finals
30 April
1	Mohun Bagan	1
2	Goa	3
30 April
6	Mumbai City	0
5	Jamshedpur	1

Final
3 May
2	Goa	3
5	Jamshedpur	0

==== Final ====
Number of teams per tier still in competition
ISL	I-League	Total
2 / 13	0 / 12	2 / 25

3 May 2025
19:30 IST (UTC+5:30)
Match 14

Goa	3–0	Jamshedpur
Herrera 23', 51'; Dražić 72'	Report; PDF; Khel Now

Kalinga Stadium, Bhubaneswar
Attendance: 7,156
Referee: Venkatesh Ramachadran
Man of the Match: Borja Herrera (Goa)

=== Durand Cup ===
==== Group stage ====
Pos	Team	Pld	W	D	L	GF	GA	GD	Pts	Qualification	ARM	JAM	CHN	ASR
1	Army Red	3	3	0	0	7	2	+5	9	Advanced to knockout stage				3–0
2	Jamshedpur (H)	3	2	0	1	7	4	+3	6		2–3		2–1	3–0
3	Chennaiyin	3	1	0	2	3	4	−1	3		0–1			2–1
4	Assam Rifles	3	0	0	3	1	8	−7	0					

Source: Twitter
Rules for classification: Group stage tiebreakers
(H) Hosts

==== Goals ====
The list is sorted by squad number when season-total goals are equal. Players with no goals are not included in the list.

As of 04 August 2024

2024–25 season
Rk.	No.	Pos.	Player	Indian Super League	Durand Cup	Total
1	11	FW	(India) Mohammed Sanan K	0	2	2
2	7	MF	(India) Imran Khan	0	1	1
2	17	FW	(Australia) Jordan Murray	0	1	1
2	21	DF	(India) Wungngayam Muirang	0	1	1
Total				0	5	5
