= 2024–25 Indian Super League =

Indian football league season

Indian Super League
- Season: 2024–25
- Dates: 13 September 2024 – 12 March 2025 (league); 29 March – 12 April 2025 (playoffs)
- Champions: Mohun Bagan; 2nd ISL Shield; 7th Indian title
- ISL Cup Winners: Mohun Bagan; 2nd ISL Cup title
- AFC Champions League Two: Mohun Bagan; Goa (as Super Cup winners)
- Matches: 163
- Goals: 468 (2.87 per match)
- Top goalscorer: Alaeddine Ajaraie (23 goals)
- Best goalkeeper: Vishal Kaith (15 clean sheets)
- Biggest home win: NorthEast United 5–0 Jamshedpur (26 October 2024); Bengaluru 5–0 Mumbai City (29 March 2025)
- Biggest away win: Hyderabad 0–6 Odisha (25 November 2024)
- Highest scoring: Hyderabad 2–5 NorthEast United (23 December 2024); Chennaiyin 5–2 Jamshedpur (9 March 2025)
- Longest winning run: 5 matches Mohun Bagan; Goa
- Longest unbeaten run: 12 matches Mohun Bagan; Goa
- Longest winless run: 11 matches Mohammedan
- Longest losing run: 6 matches East Bengal
- Highest attendance: 61,591; Mohun Bagan 2–0 Goa (8 March 2025)
- Lowest attendance: 350; Hyderabad 1–3 Punjab (6 March 2025)
- Total attendance: 1,934,882
- Average attendance: 11,870

The 2024–25 Indian Super League was the 11th season of the Indian Super League (ISL) and the 29th season of top-tier Indian football.

Mohun Bagan were the defending champions who won the shield last season. This season Mohun Bagan became the first team to successfully defend the title by winning their second ISL title and seventh Indian title overall by topping the regular season table with a record 56 points. Mumbai City were the defending cup winners who won the ISL cup last season. Mohun Bagan also won their second ISL Cup, defeating Bengaluru 2–1 in the final.

== Changes from last season ==
- This is the first season where it is no longer mandatory to include at least one player from a member association of the Asian Football Confederation (AFC).
- Besides doing away with the Asian quota, the ISL has also increased the salary cap from ₹16.5 crore (US$1.8 million) to ₹18 crore (US$1.9 million), with two players, either domestic or international, outside the salary cap. Until last season, only a marquee player's salary was outside the cap. The new guidelines will allow teams to spend freely on international players.
- As per the Asian Football Confederation roadmap, relegation was to start in the ISL from 2024–25, but the AIFF decided not to implement it this season.
- New home grown player category has been added – up to 3 of whom can be excluded from the salary cap. The homegrown players are U-23 players who have been registered with a team for consecutive 3 years.
- Maximum of one concussion substitution in a match per team, correspondingly the opposing team will receive an additional substitution opportunity.
- Claim for wrongful dismissals for direct red cards has been introduced by the AIFF.

== Teams ==
Thirteen teams are competing in the 11th season of Indian Super League – twelve from the previous season and one promoted from the I-League.

Promoted from I-League

- Mohammedan ▲

Mohammedan are promoted from the I-League after won the title and they are playing in the league for the first time in their history.

=== Stadiums and locations ===
Locations of Indian Super League teams
Location of the Kolkata football club tents and stadiums

Team	State	City	Stadium	Capacity
Bengaluru	Karnataka	Bengaluru	Sree Kanteerava Stadium	25,810
Chennaiyin	Tamil Nadu	Chennai	Marina Arena	40,000
Goa	Goa	Margao	Fatorda Stadium	19,000
Hyderabad	Telangana	Hyderabad	GMC Balayogi Athletic Stadium	30,000
Jamshedpur	Jharkhand	Jamshedpur	JRD Tata Sports Complex	24,424
Kerala Blasters	Kerala	Kochi	Kaloor Stadium	41,000
Mohammedan (Note: The club played its home derbies against East Bengal and Mohun Bagan at the Vivekananda Yuba Bharati Krirangan)	West Bengal	Kolkata	Kishore Bharati Krirangan	12,000
East Bengal	West Bengal	Kolkata	Vivekananda Yuba Bharati Krirangan	68,000
Mohun Bagan (Note: Mohun Bagan played the Kolkata Derby against East Bengal at the Indira Gandhi Athletic Stadium, Guwahati due to security concerns in Kolkata during the Gangasagar Mela.)	West Bengal	Kolkata	Vivekananda Yuba Bharati Krirangan	68,000
Mumbai City	Maharashtra	Mumbai	Mumbai Football Arena	7,000
NorthEast United (Note: The club played three home games in Jawaharlal Nehru Stadium in Shillong.)	Assam	Guwahati	Indira Gandhi Athletic Stadium	21,600
NorthEast United	Assam	Guwahati	Jawaharlal Nehru Stadium, Shillong	20,000
Odisha	Odisha	Bhubaneswar	Kalinga Stadium	15,000
Punjab (Note: The club is based in Mohali, Punjab, but played its home games in New Delhi.)	Punjab	Mohali	Jawaharlal Nehru Stadium, Delhi	60,254

== Personnel and kits ==
Team	Head coach	Captain (s)	Kit manufacturer	Shirt sponsor
Bengaluru	(Spain) Gerard Zaragoza	(India) Sunil Chhetri	Puma	JSW
Chennaiyin	(Republic of Ireland) Owen Coyle	(England) Ryan Edwards	Six5Six	MelBat
East Bengal	(Spain) Óscar Bruzón	(Brazil) Cleiton Silva	Trak-Only	
Goa	(Spain) Manolo Márquez	(Spain) Odei Onaindia	Six5Six	Wolf777News
Hyderabad	(India) Shameel Chembakath (interim)	(India) Alex Saji	Hummel	
Jamshedpur	(India) Khalid Jamil	(Spain) Javi Hernández	Nivia	Tata Steel
Kerala Blasters	(India) T. G. Purushothaman (interim)	(Uruguay) Adrián Luna	Reyaur	Medhaa
Mohammedan	(India) Mehrajuddin Wadoo	(India) Zodingliana Ralte	Six5Six	DafaNews
Mohun Bagan	(Spain) José Francisco Molina	(India) Subashish Bose	Skechers	1XBat
Mumbai City	(Czech Republic) Petr Kratky	(India) Lallianzuala Chhangte	Puma	Etihad Airways
NorthEast United	(Spain) Juan Pedro Benali	(Spain) Míchel Zabaco	Trak-Only	Meghalaya Tourism
Odisha	(Spain) Sergio Lobera	(India) Amrinder Singh	Trak-Only	Odisha Tourism
Punjab	(Greece) Panagiotis Dilmperis	(Slovenia) Luka Majcen	Shiv Naresh	DafaNews

=== Managerial changes ===
Team	Outgoing manager	Manner of departure	Date of vacancy	Ref.	Position in the table	Incoming manager	Date of appointment	Ref.
Kerala Blasters	(Serbia) Ivan Vukomanović	Mutual consent	26 April 2024		Pre-season	(Sweden) Mikael Stahre	23 May 2024	
Mohun Bagan	(Spain) Antonio López Habas	End of contract	26 April 2024		Pre-season	(Spain) José Francisco Molina	11 June 2024	
Punjab	(Greece) Staikos Vergetis	End of contract	13 June 2024		Pre-season	(Greece) Panagiotis Dilmperis	29 June 2024	
East Bengal	(Spain) Carles Cuadrat	Resigned	30 September 2024		12th	(Spain) Óscar Bruzón	8 October 2024	
Kerala Blasters	(Sweden) Mikael Stahre	Sacked	15 December 2024		10th	(India) T. G. Purushothaman (interim)	16 December 2024	
Hyderabad	(India) Thangboi Singto	Sacked	18 December 2024		12th	(India) Shameel Chembakath (interim)	18 December 2024	
Mohammedan	(Russia) Andrey Chernyshov	Resigned	29 January 2025		13th	(India) Mehrajuddin Wadoo	13 February 2025	

== Foreign players ==
The AIFF allows teams to register a maximum of six foreign players. A maximum of four can be fielded in a match at a time.

Bold suggests the player was signed during the mid-season transfer window.

Team	Player 1	Player 2	Player 3	Player 4	Player 5	Player 6	Unregistered player(s)	Former player(s)
Bengaluru	(Argentina) Jorge Pereyra Díaz	(Australia) Aleksandar Jovanovic	(Australia) Ryan Williams	(Spain) Alberto Noguera	(Spain) Édgar Méndez	(Spain) Pedro Capó		
Chennaiyin	(Brazil) Elsinho	(Brazil) Lukas Brambilla	(Colombia) Wilmar Jordán	(England) Ryan Edwards	(Nigeria) Daniel Chima Chukwu	(Scotland) Connor Shields		
East Bengal	(Brazil) Cleiton Silva	(Cameroon) Raphaël Messi Bouli	(Greece) Dimitrios Diamantakos	(Spain) Héctor Yuste	(Spain) Saúl Crespo	(Venezuela) Richard Celis	(France) Madih Talal^{INJ} (Jordan) Hijazi Maher^{INJ}	
Goa	(Albania) Armando Sadiku	(Republic of Ireland) Carl McHugh	(Serbia) Dejan Dražić	(Spain) Borja Herrera	(Spain) Iker Guarrotxena	(Spain) Odei Onaindia		
Hyderabad	(Brazil) Allan Paulista	(Brazil) Andrei Alba	(Guinea-Bissau) Edmilson Correia	(Japan) Cy Goddard	(Serbia) Stefan Šapić			
Jamshedpur	(Australia) Jordan Murray	(Japan) Rei Tachikawa	(Nigeria) Stephen Eze	(Serbia) Lazar Ćirković	(Spain) Javi Hernández	(Spain) Javier Siverio		
Kerala Blasters	(Ghana) Kwame Peprah	(Montenegro) Dušan Lagator	(Montenegro) Miloš Drinčić	(Morocco) Noah Sadaoui	(Spain) Jesús Jiménez	(Uruguay) Adrián Luna		(France) Alexandre Coeff
Mohammedan	(Argentina) Alexis Gómez	(Austria) Marc Andre Schmerböck	(Brazil) França	(France) Florent Ogier	(Ghana) Joseph Adjei	(Uzbekistan) Mirjalol Kasimov	(Ghana) Mohammed Kadiri^{INJ}	(Central African Republic) César Lobi Manzoki
Mohun Bagan	(Australia) Dimitri Petratos	(Australia) Jamie Maclaren	(Australia) Jason Cummings	(Scotland) Greg Stewart	(Scotland) Tom Aldred	(Spain) Alberto Rodríguez	(Portugal) Nuno Reis	
Mumbai City	(Greece) Nikos Karelis	(Netherlands) Yoëll van Nieff	(Spain) Jon Toral	(Spain) Jorge Ortiz	(Spain) Tiri	(Syria) Thaer Krouma	(France) Jérémy Manzorro^{INJ}	
NorthEast United	(Morocco) Alaaeddine Ajaraie	(Morocco) Hamza Regragui	(Morocco) Mohammed Ali Bemammer	(Spain) Guillermo Fernández	(Spain) Míchel Zabaco	(Spain) Néstor Albiach		
Odisha	(Brazil) Diego Maurício	(Brazil) Dori	(France) Hugo Boumous	(Senegal) Mourtada Fall	(Spain) Carlos Delgado		(Fiji) Roy Krishna^{INJ}	(Morocco) Ahmed Jahouh
Punjab	(Argentina) Ezequiel Vidal	(Bosnia and Herzegovina) Asmir Suljić	(Croatia) Filip Mrzljak	(Croatia) Ivan Novoselec	(Greece) Petros Giakoumakis	(Slovenia) Luka Majcen		(Norway) Mushaga Bakenga

== League table ==
Pos	Team	Pld	W	D	L	GF	GA	GD	Pts	Qualification
1	Mohun Bagan (C, W)	24	17	5	2	47	16	+31	56	Qualification for the Champions League Two group stage and semi-finals
2	Goa	24	14	6	4	43	27	+16	48	Qualification for the Champions League Two preliminary stage and semi-finals (Note: Goa qualified for the AFC Champions League Two preliminary stage by winning the 2025 Super Cup.)
3	Bengaluru	24	11	5	8	40	31	+9	38 (Note: Head-to-head points: Bengaluru 7, NorthEast 7, Jamshedpur 3; Head-to-head goal difference: Bengaluru +2, NorthEast -2.)	Qualification for the knockouts
4	NorthEast United	24	10	8	6	46	29	+17	38	Qualification for the knockouts
5	Jamshedpur	24	12	2	10	37	43	−6	38	Qualification for the knockouts
6	Mumbai City	24	9	9	6	29	28	+1	36	Qualification for the knockouts
7	Odisha	24	8	9	7	44	37	+7	33	
8	Kerala Blasters	24	8	5	11	33	37	−4	29	
9	East Bengal	24	8	4	12	27	33	−6	28 (Note: Head-to-head points: East Bengal 6, Punjab 0.)	
10	Punjab	24	8	4	12	34	38	−4	28	
11	Chennaiyin	24	7	6	11	34	39	−5	27	
12	Hyderabad	24	4	6	14	22	47	−25	18	
13	Mohammedan	24	2	7	15	12	43	−31	13	

Source: ISL
Rules for classification: 1) points; 2) goal difference; 3) number of goals scored; 4) head-to-head points; 5) head-to-head goal difference; 6) head-to-head goals scored; 7) fair play ranking; 8) drawing of lots
(Note: Head-to-head record is used only after all the matches between the teams in question have been played).
(C) Champions; (W) ISL Cup winners

== Results ==
Home \ Away	BEN	CHE	EAB	GOA	HYD	JAM	KER	MMD	MSG	MCI	NEU	OFC	PFC
Bengaluru	—	1–0	1–0	2–2	3–0	3–0	4–2	0–1	3–0	0–2	2–2	2–3	1–0
Chennaiyin	2–4	—	0–2	2–2	1–0	5–2	1–3	0–1	0–0	1–1	0–3	2–2	2–1
East Bengal	1–1	0–3	—	2–3	2–0	1–0	2–1	0–0	0–2	2–3	1–0	1–2	4–2
Goa	3–0	2–0	1–0	—	1–1	1–2	2–0	2–0	2–1	1–2	3–3	2–1	2–1
Hyderabad	1–1	0–0	1–1	0–2	—	3–2	1–1	3–1	0–2	0–0	2–5	0–6	1–3
Jamshedpur	2–1	1–5	2–0	3–1	2–1	—	1–0	3–1	1–1	3–2	0–2	2–3	2–1
Kerala Blasters	1–3	3–0	2–1	0–1	1–2	1–1	—	3–0	0–3	1–0	0–0	3–2	1–2
Mohammedan	1–2	2–2	1–3	1–1	0–4	0–2	1–2	—	0–4	0–1	0–1	0–0	2–2
Mohun Bagan	1–0	1–0	1–0	2–0	3–0	3–0	3–2	3–0	—	2–2	3–2	1–0	3–0
Mumbai City	0–0	1–0	0–0	1–3	1–0	0–3	4–2	3–0	2–2	—	0–3	1–1	0–3
NorthEast United	0–2	2–3	4–0	1–1	4–1	5–0	1–1	0–0	0–2	0–2	—	3–2	1–1
Odisha	4–2	2–3	2–1	2–4	3–1	2–1	2–2	0–0	1–1	0–0	2–2	—	1–1
Punjab	3–2	3–2	1–3	0–1	2–0	1–2	0–1	2–0	1–3	1–1	1–2	2–1	—

Source: ISL Fixtures
Legend: Blue = home team win; Yellow = draw; Red = away team win.

=== Form ===
Team ╲ Round	1	2	3	4	5	6	7	8	9	10	11	12	13	14	15	16	17	18	19	20	21	22	23	24
Bengaluru	W	W	W	D	W	W	L	D	W	L	W	D	W	L	L	D	L	L	L	W	W	W	D	L
Chennaiyin	W	L	D	W	D	L	W	D	L	L	L	W	L	L	D	D	D	L	L	W	W	L	L	W
East Bengal	L	L	L	L	L	L	D	W	W	L	W	W	D	L	L	L	W	D	L	W	W	W	D	L
Goa	L	D	W	D	L	D	W	W	W	W	D	W	W	D	D	W	W	L	W	W	W	W	W	L
Hyderabad	L	L	D	L	W	L	W	L	L	L	L	L	D	L	D	D	W	L	W	L	D	L	L	D
Jamshedpur	W	W	L	W	W	L	L	L	W	W	L	W	W	W	D	L	W	W	L	L	W	D	L	L
Kerala Blasters	L	W	D	D	W	L	L	L	W	L	L	L	W	L	W	W	D	L	W	L	L	D	W	D
Mohammedan	L	D	W	L	L	L	D	L	L	L	L	L	D	D	W	D	L	L	L	L	L	D	L	D
Mohun Bagan	D	W	L	W	W	W	D	W	W	W	W	L	W	W	W	D	D	W	W	W	W	W	D	W
Mumbai City	D	L	D	W	D	W	D	L	W	D	W	W	L	W	L	D	W	D	W	L	D	D	L	W
NorthEast United	W	L	D	D	L	W	W	D	W	L	L	W	W	D	D	D	D	W	D	L	W	L	W	W
Odisha	L	L	W	D	W	D	L	D	W	W	D	W	D	L	D	L	W	D	L	D	W	L	D	W
Punjab	W	W	W	L	W	L	L	W	W	L	L	L	L	D	D	L	W	L	D	L	L	L	W	D

Source: ISL
W = Win; D = Draw; L = Lose

=== Positions by round ===
Round	1	2	3	4	5	6	7	8	9	10	11	12	13	14	15	16	17	18	19	20	21	22	23	24	25	26
Bengaluru	4	1	1	1	1	1	1	1	1	2	2	2	2	2	2	2	3	3	5	4	5	5	4	4	3	3
Chennaiyin	1	5	9	8	6	6	6	4	7	9	9	9	9	9	10	10	10	10	11	11	10	10	8	10	11	11
East Bengal	12	12	12	13	13	13	13	13	13	13	11	11	11	11	11	11	11	11	10	10	11	11	9	8	8	9
Goa	10	9	4	5	8	10	7	5	6	6	4	4	3	3	3	4	2	2	2	3	2	2	2	2	2	2
Hyderabad	8	13	13	12	12	11	11	11	11	11	12	12	12	12	12	13	13	12	12	12	12	12	12	12	12	12
Jamshedpur	2	2	3	3	2	2	4	7	8	7	7	6	8	5	4	3	4	4	3	2	3	3	3	3	4	5
Kerala Blasters	11	6	5	7	5	8	10	10	9	10	10	10	10	10	9	9	8	8	8	8	8	8	10	9	9	8
Mohammedan	13	10	7	10	11	12	12	12	12	12	13	13	13	13	13	12	12	13	13	13	13	13	13	13	13	13
Mohun Bagan	7	4	8	4	3	3	2	2	2	1	1	1	1	1	1	1	1	1	1	1	1	1	1	1	1	1
Mumbai City	6	8	11	11	7	9	8	8	10	8	8	7	4	7	5	6	6	5	6	6	6	6	6	5	7	6
NorthEast United	5	7	6	6	9	5	5	3	3	4	6	8	6	4	6	5	5	6	5	6	4	4	5	6	5	4
Odisha	9	11	10	9	10	7	9	9	5	3	5	3	5	6	7	7	7	7	7	7	7	7	7	7	6	7
Punjab	3	3	2	2	4	4	3	6	4	5	3	5	7	8	8	8	9	9	9	9	9	9	11	11	10	10

Qualification to 2025–26 AFC Champions League Two and 2024–25 Indian Super League Semi Final
Qualification to 2024–25 Indian Super League Semi Final and possible qualification for the Champions League Two preliminary stage
Qualification to 2024–25 Indian Super League Playoffs

Source: ISL

== Season statistics ==
As of 12 April 2025

=== Top scorers ===
Rank	Player	Team	Goals
1	(Morocco) Alaaeddine Ajaraie	NorthEast United	23
2	(India) Sunil Chhetri	Bengaluru	14
3	(Australia) Jamie Maclaren	Mohun Bagan	12
4	(Spain) Jesús Jiménez	Kerala Blasters	11
5	(Slovenia) Luka Majcen	Punjab	10
5	(Albania) Armando Sadiku	Goa	10
5	(Greece) Nikos Karelis	Mumbai City	10
5	(Colombia) Wilmar Jordan	Chennaiyin	10
9	(Brazil) Diego Mauricio	Odisha	9
9	(Spain) Édgar Méndez	Bengaluru	9
9	(Spain) Javi Hernández	Jamshedpur	9

==== Hat-tricks ====
Player	For	Against	Result	Date	Ref
(Spain) Borja Herrera	Goa	East Bengal	3–2 (A)	27 September 2024	
(India) Sunil Chhetri	Bengaluru	Kerala Blasters	4–2 (H)	7 December 2024	

=== Top assists ===
Rank	Player	Team	Assists
1	(Scotland) Connor Shields	Chennaiyin	8
2	(France) Hugo Boumous	Odisha	7
2	(Morocco) Alaeddine Ajaraie	NorthEast United	7
4	(Australia) Jason Cummings	Mohun Bagan	6
4	(Brazil) Diego Maurício	Odisha	6
4	(Uruguay) Adrián Luna	Kerala Blasters	6
7	(Scotland) Greg Stewart	Mohun Bagan	5
7	(Brazil) Lukas Brambilla	Chennaiyin	5
7	(Morocco) Noah Sadaoui	Kerala Blasters	5
7	(India) Jithin MS	NorthEast United	5

=== Clean sheets ===
Rank	Player	Team	Clean sheets
1	(India) Vishal Kaith	Mohun Bagan	15
2	(India) Phurba Lachenpa	Mumbai City	8
2	(India) Gurpreet Singh Sandhu	Bengaluru	8
4	(India) Hrithik Tiwari	Goa	7
4	(India) Gurmeet Singh	NorthEast United	7
6	(India) Prabhsukhan Singh Gill	East Bengal	6
7	(India) Albino Gomes	Jamshedpur	5
7	(India) Padam Chettri	Mohammedan	5
9	(India) Sachin Suresh	Kerala Blasters	4
9	(India) Amrinder Singh	Odisha	4

=== Discipline ===
==== Player ====
- Most yellow cards: 9
  - (Uzbekistan) Mirjalol Kasimov (Mohammedan)
- Most red cards: 3
  - (Morocco) Ahmed Jahouh (Odisha)
  - (India) Lalchungnunga (East Bengal)

==== Club ====
- Most yellow cards: 72
  - Mohun Bagan
- Most red cards: 10
  - East Bengal

== Attendances ==
=== Regular season ===
Pos	Team	Total	High	Low	Average	Change
1	Mohun Bagan	428,933	61,591	2,567	35,744	+2.7%
2	East Bengal	221,169	59,872	9,987	18,431	+13.2%
3	Kerala Blasters	190,727	34,490	3,567	15,894	−42.2%
4	Jamshedpur	171,413	20,257	10,177	14,284	−4.7%
5	Bengaluru	142,057	22,302	7,367	11,838	+46.9%
6	NorthEast United	126,311	15,379	5,795	10,526	+94.8%
7	Goa	123,548	13,341	5,205	10,296	+19.1%
8	Odisha	91,816	10,814	5,461	7,651	+29.5%
9	Chennaiyin	85,217	11,201	3,312	7,101	+15.5%
10	Mohammedan	49,141	10,189	894	4,095	−13.9%^{†}
11	Mumbai City	44,755	6,928	1,772	3,730	−11.3%
12	Punjab	36,093	6,216	1,816	3,008	−19.9%
13	Hyderabad	18,209	3,317	350	1,517	−30.2%
	League total	1,729,389	61,591	350	11,086	−3.5%

Notes:
^{†}Mohammedan played in the I-League in the 2023–24 season

=== Attendances by match ===
Team \ Home Game	1	2	3	4	5	6	7	8	9	10	11	12	Total
Mohun Bagan	41,002	23,055	40,001	31,035	29,456	35,598	36,889	2,567 (Note: Mohun Bagan played the Kolkata Derby against East Bengal at the Indira Gandhi Athletic Stadium, Guwahati due to security concerns in Kolkata during the Gangasagar Mela.)	41,925	28,817	56,997	61,591	428,933
East Bengal	11,312	59,872	21,119	12,819	13,422	9,989	16,564	16,899	14,431	16,791	9,987	17,964	221,169
Kerala Blasters	17,498	24,911	34,940	15,416	16,980	17,714	15,715	9,854	10,432	19,311	4,389	3,567	190,727
Jamshedpur	16,311	20,257	19,726	16,672	11,890	12,440	13,776	12,109	13,875	12,303	10,177	11,877	171,413
Bengaluru	11,923	7,823	15,323	9,348	13,783	22,302	15,441	10,789	9,881	10,154	7,367	7,923	142,057
NorthEast	9,739	9,237	7,897	10,039	15,379	8,193	6,719	5,795	14,897	14,288	14,201	9,927	126,311
Goa	7,240	5,205	11,824	9,641	10,821	13,263	11,671	10,832	13,341	9,479	11,858	8,373	123,548
Odisha	7,287	8,227	8,719	7,649	10,814	9,014	7,827	7,223	7,134	6,814	5,647	5,461	91,816
Chennaiyin	9,791	8,497	9,473	8,427	4,871	10,007	4,719	5,974	11,201	5,147	3,798	3,312	85,217
Mohammedan	4,936	4,188	6,203	5,276	2,541	3,183	2,177	2,167	10,189	6,126	1,261	894	49,141
Mumbai City	6,928	4,921	6,137	2,549	2,993	2,847	2,993	2,232	1,772	2,068	3,741	5,574	44,755
Punjab	3,500	4,200	1,865	6,216	2,146	3,458	3,123	1,816	1,896	3,139	2,606	2,128	36,093
Hyderabad	1,753	3,317	1,206	1,446	1,358	1,463	2,072	1,027	1,031	1,483	350	1,703	18,209

Legend: Highest Lowest

==== Playoffs ====
Match		Attendance
Knockout 1 (Kanteerava)		16,123
Knockout 2 (JNS Shillong)		14,849
Semi-final 1	First Leg (Kanteerava)	19,443
Semi-final 1	Second Leg (Fatorda)	16,875
Semi-final 2	First Leg (JRD TSC)	20,968
Semi-final 2	Second Leg (VYBK)	58,123
Final (VYBK)		59,112
Total		205,493
Average		29,356

== Awards ==
Award	Winner	Team
Player of the league	(Morocco) Alaaeddine Ajaraie	NorthEast United
Golden boot	(Morocco) Alaaeddine Ajaraie	NorthEast United
Golden glove	(India) Vishal Kaith	Mohun Bagan
Emerging player of the league	(India) Brison Fernandes	Goa
Grassroots award	Jamshedpur	
Best elite youth program	Punjab	
Source: ISL

Team of the season
Goalkeeper	Defenders	Midfielders	Forwards	Coach	Ref.
(India) Vishal (Mohun Bagan)	(India) Bose (Mohun Bagan) (C) (Spain) Alberto (Mohun Bagan) (India) Sandesh (Goa) (India) Bheke (Bengaluru)	(Spain) Javi (Jamshedpur) (Spain) Noguera (Bengaluru) (Scotland) Shields (Chennaiyin)	(Morocco) Ajaraie (NorthEast United) (India) Chhetri (Bengaluru) (Australia) Cummings (Mohun Bagan)	(Spain) José Molina (Mohun Bagan)	

Fan's team of the season
Goalkeeper	Defenders	Midfielders	Forwards	Coach
(India) Vishal (Mohun Bagan)	(India) Bose (Mohun Bagan) (LB) (Spain) Alberto (Mohun Bagan) (LCB) (Scotland) Tom (Mohun Bagan) (RCB) (India) Boris (Goa) (RB)	(Spain) Javi (Jamshedpur) (LCM) (India) Apuia (Mohun Bagan) (CM) (Scotland) Stewart (Mohun Bagan) (RCM)	(Morocco) Ajaraie (NorthEast United) (LW) (Australia) Maclaren (Mohun Bagan) (ST) (India) Manvir Singh (Mohun Bagan) (RW)	(Spain) José Molina (Mohun Bagan)
Fan's Goal of the Season
(Australia) Jason Cummings (Mohun Bagan)
Source: Instagram

=== Monthly awards ===
Player of the month
Month	Player	Team	Ref.
September	(Morocco) Alaeddine Ajaraie	NorthEast United	
October	(Morocco) Alaeddine Ajaraie	NorthEast United	
November	(Morocco) Alaeddine Ajaraie	NorthEast United	
December	(Australia) Ryan Williams	Bengaluru	
January	(India) Vishal Kaith	Mohun Bagan	
February	(Australia) Jamie Maclaren	Mohun Bagan	

Emerging player of the month
Month	Player	Team	Ref.
September	(India) Vinith Venkatesh	Bengaluru	
October	(India) Parthib Gogoi	NorthEast United	
November	(India) Nathan Rodrigues	Mumbai City	
December	(India) PV Vishnu	East Bengal	
January	(India) Brison Fernandes	Goa	
February	(India) Dippendu Biswas	Mohun Bagan	
March	(India) Irfan Yadwad	Chennaiyin	

=== Weekly awards ===
Team of Matchweek
Matchweek	Goalkeeper	Defenders	Midfielders	Forwards	Coach	Ref.
1	(India) Gurpreet (Bengaluru) (C)	(Nigeria) Eze (Jamshedpur) (Spain) Tiri (Mumbai City) (Spain) Alberto (Mohun Bagan)	(India) Noufal (Mumbai City) (Morocco) Bemammer (NorthEast United) (India) Farukh (Chennaiyin) (Scotland) Shields (Chennaiyin) (India) Vinith (Bengaluru)	(Slovenia) Luka (Punjab) (Australia) Murray (Jamshedpur)	(India) Khalid Jamil (Jamshedpur)	
2	(India) Kattimani (Goa)	(India) Bose (Mohun Bagan) (India) Dippendu (Mohun Bagan) (India) Bheke (Bengaluru) (India) Zuidika (Mohammedan)	(Morocco) Noah (Kerala Blasters) (Argentina) Alexis (Mohammedan) (Spain) Javi (Jamshedpur) (India) Nihal (Punjab)	(Morocco) Ajaraie (NorthEast United) (India) Chhetri (Bengaluru) (C)	(Greece) Panagiotis Dilmperis (Punjab)	
3	(India) Gurpreet (Bengaluru)	(India) Bora (Mohammedan) (Senegal) Fall (Odisha) (India) Poojary (Bengaluru)	(Spain) Borja (Goa) (France) Boumous (Odisha) (Croatia) Mrzljak (Punjab) (Morocco) Noah (Kerala Blasters)	(Spain) Mendez (Bengaluru) (India) Chhetri (Bengaluru) (C) (Brazil) Mauricio (Odisha)	(Spain) Gerard Zaragoza (Bengaluru)	
4	(India) Albino (Jamshedpur)	(India) Bose (Mohun Bagan) (C) (India) Saji (Hyderabad) (Nigeria) Eze (Jamshedpur) (India) Bheke (Bengaluru)	(Scotland) Stewart (Mohun Bagan) (Morocco) Jahouh (Odisha) (Spain) Nestor (Punjab)	(Morocco) Noah (Kerala Blasters) (Morocco) Ajaraie (NorthEast United) (Albania) Sadiku (Goa)	(Spain) José Molina (Mohun Bagan)	
5	(India) Albino (Jamshedpur)	(India) Roshan (Bengaluru) (Nigeria) Eze (Jamshedpur) (Scotland) Tom (Mohun Bagan) (India) Mehtab (Mumbai City)(C)	(India) Vibin (Kerala Blasters) (Scotland) Stewart (Mohun Bagan) (Netherlands) Nieff (Mumbai City)	(Spain) Jimenez (Kerala Blasters) (Australia) Maclaren (Mohun Bagan) (Colombia) Jordan (Chennaiyin)	(Sweden) Mikael Stahre (Kerala Blasters)	
6	(India) Biaka (Hyderabad)	(India) Rafi (Hyderabad) (Spain) Zabaco (NorthEast United) (C) (Senegal) Fall (Odisha FC)	(India) Samte (NorthEast United) (Scotland) Shields (Chennaiyin) (India) Mayakkannan (NorthEast United) (India) Parag (Hyderabad)	(Morocco) Ajaraie (NorthEast United) (Brazil) Paulista (Hyderabad) (Spain) Mendez (Bengaluru)	(India) Thangboi Singto (Hyderabad)	
7	(India) Vishal (Mohun Bagan)	(India) Bose (Mohun Bagan) (C) (India) Sandesh (Goa) (India) Nathan (Mumbai City)	(India) Chhangte (Mumbai City) (Brazil) Elsinho (Chennaiyin) (Morocco) Bemammer (NorthEast United) (Scotland) Shields (Chennaiyin)	(India) Irfan (Chennaiyin) (Slovenia) Luka (Punjab) (Morocco) Ajaraie (NorthEast United)	(Czech Republic) Petr Kratky (Mumbai City)	
8	(India) Prabhsukhan (East Bengal)	(India) Nathan (Mumbai City) (Jordan) Hijazi (East Bengal) (Senegal) Fall (Odisha) (C) (India) Saji (Hyderabad)	(Spain) Guarrotxena (Goa) (Brazil) Alba (Hyderabad) (Spain) Noguera (Bengaluru) (Scotland) Shields (Chennaiyin) (India) Boris (Goa)	(Morocco) Ajaraie (NorthEast United)	(India) Thangboi Singto (Hyderabad)	
9	(India) Amrinder (Odisha) (C)	(India) Abhishek (Punjab) (Spain) Zabaco (NorthEast) (Senegal) Fall (Odisha) (India) Amey (Odisha)	(Morocco) Noah (Kerala Blasters) (India) Mayakkannan (NorthEast) (Australia) Dimi (Mohun Bagan) (India) Manvir (Mohun Bagan)	(Brazil) Mauricio (Odisha) (Spain) Jimenez (Kerala Blasters)	(Spain) Sergio Lobera (Odisha)	
10	(India) Albino (Jamshedpur)	(India) Mehtab (Mumbai) (Nigeria) Eze (Jamshedpur) (Senegal) Fall (Odisha) (C) (India) Boris (Goa)	(Scotland) Stewart (Mohun Bagan) (Republic of Ireland) McHugh (Goa) (France) Talal (East Bengal)	(India) Sanan (Jamshedpur) (Greece) Diamantakos (East Bengal) (Brazil) Mauricio (Odisha)	(Spain) Sergio Lobera (Odisha)	
11	(India) Vishal (Mohun Bagan)	(India) Roshan (Bengaluru) (Scotland) Tom (Mohun Bagan) (Spain) Odei (Goa) (India) Ashish (Mohun Bagan)	(India) Liston (Mohun Bagan) (Netherlands) Nieff (Mumbai) (India) Manvir (Mohun Bagan)	(Slovenia) Luka (Punjab) (India) Chhetri (Bengaluru) (C) (Australia) Ryan (Bengaluru)	(Spain) José Molina (Mohun Bagan)	
12	(India) Nawaz (Chennaiyin)	(India) Naocha (Kerala Blasters) (Spain) Alberto (Mohun Bagan) (India) Sandesh (Goa) (C) (India) Ashish (Mohun Bagan)	(Morocco) Jahouh (Odisha) (France) Boumous (Odisha) (India) Sahil (Goa)	(India) Vikram (Mumbai) (Spain) Siverio (Jamshedpur) (Australia) Ryan (Bengaluru)	(Spain) José Molina (Mohun Bagan)	
13	(India) Rehenesh (Mumbai City)	(Montenegro) Drinčić (Kerala Blasters) (Spain) Odei (Goa) (C) (Spain) Tiri (Mumbai City)	(India) Brison (Goa) (India) Hnamte (Chennaiyin) (India) Anwar (East Bengal) (Morocco) Noah (Kerala Blasters)	(India) Vishnu (East Bengal) (Guinea-Bissau) Correia (Hyderabad) (Spain) Guillermo (NorthEast United)	(Spain) Óscar Bruzón (East Bengal)	
14	(India) Albino (Jamshedpur)	(India) Uvais (Jamshedpur) (Spain) Alberto (Mohun Bagan) (C) (India) Asheer (NorthEast United) (India) Barla (Jamshedpur)	(Argentina) Alexis (Mohammedan) (India) Mayakkannan (NorthEast United) (India) Macarton (NorthEast United)	(Argentina) Diaz (Bengaluru) (Morocco) Ajaraie (NorthEast United) (Australia) Ryan (Bengaluru)	(Spain) Pedro Benali (NorthEast United)	
15	(India) Vishal (Mohun Bagan)	(India) Bose (Mohun Bagan) (C) (India) Hormipam (Kerala Blasters) (France) Ogier (Mohammedan)	(India) Uvais (Jamshedpur) (India) Brison (Goa) (Spain) Borja (Goa) (India) Liston (Mohun Bagan) (India) Redeem (NorthEast United)	(Greece) Nikolaos (Mumbai City) (Australia) Murray (Jamshedpur)	(India) Khalid Jamil (Jamshedpur)	
16	(India) Padam (Mohammedan)	(India) Bose (Mohun Bagan) (C) (India) Meitei (Punjab) (France) Ogier (Mohammedan) (India) Barla (Jamshedpur)	(India) Manvir (Mohun Bagan) (India) Hnamte (Chennaiyin) (Uzbekistan) Kasimov (Mohammedan) (Scotland) Shields (Chennaiyin)	(Albania) Sadiku (Goa) (Colombia) Jordan (Chennaiyin)	(India) Khalid Jamil (Jamshedpur)	
17	(India) Hrithik (Goa)	(India) Abhishek (Punjab) (Nigeria) Eze (Jamshedpur) (India) Sandesh (Goa) (India) Bose (Mohun Bagan) (C)	(India) Brison (Goa) (Spain) Javi (Jamshedpur) (Scotland) Shields (Chennaiyin)	(India) Manvir (Mohammedan) (India) Chhetri (Bengaluru) (Ghana) Peprah (Kerala Blasters)	(India) T. G. Purushothaman (Kerala Blasters)	
18	(India) Nawaz (Chennaiyin)	(India) Aakash (Goa) (Jordan) Hijazi (East Bengal) (India) Sandesh (Goa) (C) (India) Manoj (Hyderabad)	(Brazil) Alba (Hyderabad) (Spain) Guarrotxena (Goa) (Spain) Jon (Mumbai City)	(India) Mahesh (East Bengal) (Brazil) Mauricio (Odisha) (India) Ramhlunchhunga (Hyderabad)	(Spain) Manolo Márquez (Goa)	
19	(India) Vishal (Mohun Bagan)	(India) Uvais (Jamshedpur) (Scotland) Tom (Mohun Bagan) (Spain) Tiri (Mumbai City) (India) Pratik (Jamshedpur)	(Uruguay) Luna (Kerala Blasters) (Morocco) Bemammer (NorthEast United) (Spain) Javi (Jamshedpur) (C)	(India) Liston (Mohun Bagan) (Morocco) Ajaraie (NorthEast United) (India) Korou (Kerala Blasters)	(India) T. G. Purushothaman (Kerala Blasters)	
20	(India) Vishal (Mohun Bagan)	(India) Bose (Mohun Bagan) (C) (Scotland) Tom (Mohun Bagan) (India) Pratik (Jamshedpur) (India) Abhishek (Punjab)	(Australia) Cummings (Mohun Bagan) (Spain) Javi (Jamshedpur) (India) Isak (Odisha)	(Morocco) Ajaraie (NorthEast United) (Spain) Siverio (Jamshedpur) (India) Manvir (Mohun Bagan)	(India) Khalid Jamil (Jamshedpur)	
21	(India) Lachenpa (Mumbai City)	(India) Valpuia (Mumbai City) (India) Mehtab (Mumbai City) (Spain) Delgado (Odisha) (C) (India) Dippendu (Mohun Bagan)	(India) Ramhlunchhunga (Hyderabad) (Spain) Noguera (Bengaluru) (Netherlands) Nieff (Mumbai City) (India) Irfan (Chennaiyin)	(Brazil) Paulista (Hyderabad) (Australia) Maclaren (Mohun Bagan)	(Spain) José Molina (Mohun Bagan)	
22	(India) Hrithik (Goa)	(India) Bose (Mohun Bagan) (C) (Senegal) Fall (Odisha) (Spain) Alberto (Mohun Bagan)	(India) Boris (Goa) (Spain) Guarrotxena (Goa) (France) Boumous (Odisha) (India) Redeem (NorthEast United)	(Morocco) Ajaraie (NorthEast United) (Australia) Maclaren (Mohun Bagan) (India) Mahesh (East Bengal)	(Spain) Manolo Márquez (Goa)	
23	(India) Arshdeep (Hyderabad)	(India) Uvais (Jamshedpur) (Spain) Delgado (Odisha) (C) (Serbia) Šapić (Hyderabad) (India) Rakip (East Bengal)	(India) Mahesh (East Bengal) (Republic of Ireland) McHugh (Goa) (Spain) Noguera (Bengaluru)	(Australia) Petratos (Mohun Bagan) (Greece) Diamantakos (East Bengal) (Spain) Guarrotxena (Goa)	(Spain) José Molina (Mohun Bagan)	
24	(India) Prabhsukhan (East Bengal)	(India) Sandesh (Goa) (C) (India) Chinglensana (Bengaluru) (India) Bheke (Bengaluru)	(Argentina) Alexis (Mohammedan) (Republic of Ireland) McHugh (Goa) (Spain) Noguera (Bengaluru) (Netherlands) Nieff (Mumbai City) (India) Udanta (Goa)	(Cameroon) Messi Bouli (East Bengal) (India) Korou (Kerala Blasters)	(Spain) Gerard Zaragoza (Bengaluru)	
25	(India) Gurmeet (NorthEast United)	(India) Thoiba (Odisha) (Montenegro) Drinčić (Kerala Blasters) (Montenegro) Lagator (Kerala Blasters)	(Serbia) Dražić (Goa) (France) Boumous (Odisha) (Argentina) Vidal (Punjab) (India) Suhail (Punjab)	(Spain) Guarrotxena (Goa) (Morocco) Ajaraie (NorthEast United) (C) (India) Jithin (NorthEast United)	(India) T. G. Purushothaman (Kerala Blasters)	
26	(India) Samik (Chennaiyin)	(India) Ashique (Mohun Bagan) (India) Laldinpuia (Chennaiyin) (Spain) Alberto (Mohun Bagan) (C) (India) Lhungdim (Punjab)	(India) Irfan (Chennaiyin) (Morocco) Bemammer (NorthEast United) (Scotland) Stewart (Mohun Bagan) (India) Chhangte (Mumbai City)	(Nigeria) Chima (Chennaiyin) (Morocco) Alaaeddine (NorthEast United)	(Spain) José Molina (Mohun Bagan)	

Fans' Goal of the Week
Matchweek	Player	Team	Ref.
1	(Spain) Alberto Rodríguez	Mohun Bagan	
2	(Morocco) Noah Sadaoui	Kerala Blasters	
3	(Morocco) Noah Sadaoui	Kerala Blasters	
4	(Spain) Jesus Jimenez	Kerala Blasters	
5	(Australia) Jamie Maclaren	Mohun Bagan	
6	(Morocco) Alaeddine Ajaraie	NorthEast United	
7	(Morocco) Alaeddine Ajaraie	NorthEast United	
8	(Morocco) Alaeddine Ajaraie	NorthEast United	
9	(India) Liston Colaco	Mohun Bagan	
10	(Greece) Dimitrios Diamantakos	East Bengal	
11	(India) Jeakson Singh	East Bengal	
12	(Spain) Alberto Rodríguez	Mohun Bagan	
13	(India) David Lalhlansanga	East Bengal	
14	(Spain) Alberto Rodríguez	Mohun Bagan	
15	(India) David Lalhlansanga	East Bengal	
16	(Uzbekistan) Mirjalol Kasimov	Mohammedan	
17	(Ghana) Kwame Peprah	Kerala Blasters	
18	(India) P.V. Vishnu	East Bengal	
19	(Spain) Jesus Jimenez	Kerala Blasters	
20	(India) Manvir Singh	Mohun Bagan	
21	(Australia) Jamie Maclaren	Mohun Bagan	
22	(Australia) Jamie Maclaren	Mohun Bagan	
23	(Australia) Dimitri Petratos	Mohun Bagan	
24	(India) Korou Singh	Kerala Blasters	
25	(Cameroon) Messi Bouli	East Bengal	
26	(Scotland) Greg Stewart	Mohun Bagan	

=== Match awards ===
Player of the Match
Match	Player of the Match		Match	Player of the Match		Match	Player of the Match		Match	Player of the Match	
Match	Player	Club	Match	Player	Club	Match	Player	Club	Match	Player	Club
1	(Spain) Tiri	Mumbai City	40	(Morocco) Alaeddine Ajaraie (2)	NorthEast United	79	(Spain) Alberto Rodríguez	Mohun Bagan	118	(Spain) Javier Siverio (2)	Jamshedpur
2	(India) Farukh Choudhary	Chennaiyin	41	(India) Lallianzuala Chhangte	Mumbai City	80	(Argentina) Alexis Gómez	Mohammedan	119	(Morocco) Alaeddine Ajaraie (4)	NorthEast United
3	(India) Vinith Venkatesh	Bengaluru	42	(India) Irfan Yadwad	Chennaiyin	81	(Guinea-Bissau) Edmilson Correia	Hyderabad	120	(Australia) Jamie Maclaren (2)	Mohun Bagan
4	(India) Nihal Sudeesh	Punjab	43	(Spain) Iker Guarrotxena	Goa	82	(Australia) Ryan Williams (2)	Bengaluru	121	(India) Brison Fernandes (3)	Goa
5	(India) Jithin M. S.	NorthEast United	44	(Brazil) Andrei Alba	Hyderabad	83	(Nigeria) Stephen Eze (2)	Jamshedpur	122	(India) Mehtab Singh	Mumbai City
6	(Nigeria) Stephen Eze	Jamshedpur	45	(Morocco) Alaeddine Ajaraie (3)	NorthEast United	84	(India) Macarton Nickson	NorthEast United	123	(Brazil) Allan Paulista (2)	Hyderabad
7	(India) Sunil Chhetri	Bengaluru	46	(India) Nathan Rodrigues	Mumbai City	85	(India) Liston Colaco	Mohun Bagan	124	(India) Irfan Yadwad (4)	Chennaiyin
8	(India) Nihal Sudeesh (2)	Punjab	47	(India) Lalchungnunga	East Bengal	86	(France) Florent Ogier	Mohammedan	125	(Spain) Alberto Noguera	Bengaluru
9	(Spain) Javi Hernández	Jamshedpur	48	(India) Apuia	Mohun Bagan	87	(India) Brison Fernandes (2)	Goa	126	(France) Hugo Boumous	Odisha
10	(Brazil) França	Mohammedan	49	(Spain) Michel Zabaco	NorthEast United	88	(Australia) Jordan Murray	Jamshedpur	127	(India) Udanta Singh	Goa
11	(Morocco) Noah Sadaoui	Kerala Blasters	50	(India) Manvir Singh (2)	Mohun Bagan	89	(India) Freddy Lallawmawma	Kerala Blasters	128	(Morocco) Alaeddine Ajaraie (5)	NorthEast United
12	(Scotland) Greg Stewart	Mohun Bagan	51	(Morocco) Noah Sadaoui (5)	Kerala Blasters	90	(India) Lallianzuala Chhangte (2)	Mumbai City	129	(France) Hugo Boumous (2)	Odisha
13	(India) Nikhil Prabhu	Punjab	52	(Brazil) Diego Mauricio	Odisha	91	(Serbia) Dejan Dražić (2)	Goa	130	(Scotland) Connor Shields (4)	Chennaiyin
14	(India) Lalremsanga Fanai	Mohammedan	53	(India) Abhishek Singh	Punjab	92	(Scotland) Connor Shields (3)	Chennaiyin	131	(Australia) Jamie Maclaren (3)	Mohun Bagan
15	(Spain) Borja Herrera	Goa	54	(India) Sunil Chhetri (2)	Bengaluru	93	(Bosnia and Herzegovina) Asmir Suljić	Punjab	132	(India) Naorem Mahesh Singh (2)	East Bengal
16	(India) Isak Vanlalruatfela	Odisha	55	(India) Boris Singh	Goa	94	(France) Florent Ogier (2)	Mohammedan	133	(India) Arshdeep Singh	Hyderabad
17	(Spain) Édgar Méndez	Bengaluru	56	(France) Madih Talal	East Bengal	95	(Australia) Jamie Maclaren	Mohun Bagan	134	(India) Muhammad Uvais	Jamshedpur
18	(Morocco) Noah Sadaoui (2)	Kerala Blasters	57	(Syria) Thaer Krouma	Mumbai City	96	(India) Nikhil Barla	Jamshedpur	135	(Spain) Alberto Noguera (2)	Bengaluru
19	(India) Alex Saji	Hyderabad	58	(Scotland) Greg Stewart (3)	Mohun Bagan	97	(Morocco) Noah Sadaoui (7)	Kerala Blasters	136	(India) Lalchungnunga (2)	East Bengal
20	(India) Rahul Bheke	Bengaluru	59	(Brazil) Diego Mauricio (2)	Odisha	98	(Republic of Ireland) Carl McHugh	Goa	137	(Spain) Iker Guarrotxena (3)	Goa
21	(Morocco) Noah Sadaoui (3)	Kerala Blasters	60	(India) Mohammed Sanan (2)	Jamshedpur	99	(India) Lalremsanga Fanai (2)	Mohammedan	138	(Australia) Dimitri Petratos	Mohun Bagan
22	(Spain) Néstor Albiach	NorthEast United	61	(Spain) Iker Guarrotxena (2)	Goa	100	(India) Abhishek Singh (3)	Punjab	139	(India) Rahul Bheke (2)	Bengaluru
23	(India) Albino Gomes	Jamshedpur	62	(India) Jerry Lalrinzuala	Odisha	101	(Nigeria) Stephen Eze (3)	Jamshedpur	140	(Cameroon) Raphaël Messi Bouli	East Bengal
24	(India) Subhasish Bose	Mohun Bagan	63	(India) Abhishek Singh (2)	Punjab	102	(India) Devendra Murgaonkar	Hyderabad	141	(Republic of Ireland) Carl McHugh (3)	Goa
25	(Scotland) Connor Shields	Chennaiyin	64	(India) P.V. Vishnu	East Bengal	103	(India) Korou Singh	Kerala Blasters	142	(France) Florent Ogier (3)	Mohammedan
26	(India) Naorem Roshan Singh	Bengaluru	65	(India) Sunil Chhetri (3)	Bengaluru	104	(India) Sandesh Jhingan	Goa	143	(Netherlands) Yoëll van Nieff (2)	Mumbai City
27	(Netherlands) Yoëll van Nieff	Mumbai City	66	(India) Asish Rai	Mohun Bagan	105	(India) Irfan Yadwad (3)	Chennaiyin	144	(India) Korou Singh (2)	Kerala Blasters
28	(Scotland) Greg Stewart (2)	Mohun Bagan	67	(India) Irfan Yadwad (2)	Chennaiyin	106	(Brazil) Diego Mauricio (3)	Odisha	145	(India) Souvik Chakrabarti	East Bengal
29	(Morocco) Noah Sadaoui (4)	Kerala Blasters	68	(India) Isak Vanlalruatfela (2)	Odisha	107	(India) Ramhlunchhunga	Hyderabad	146	(Morocco) Alaeddine Ajaraie (6)	NorthEast United
30	(India) Mohammed Sanan	Jamshedpur	69	(Spain) Javier Siverio	Jamshedpur	108	(India) P.V. Vishnu (3)	East Bengal	147	(Spain) Iker Guarrotxena (4)	Goa
31	(Senegal) Mourtada Fall	Odisha	70	(Australia) Ryan Williams	Bengaluru	109	(Republic of Ireland) Carl McHugh (2)	Goa	148	(France) Hugo Boumous (3)	Odisha
32	(Scotland) Connor Shields (2)	Chennaiyin	71	(India) Ashique Kuruniyan	Mohun Bagan	110	(Spain) Jon Toral	Mumbai City	149	(India) Muhammad Suhail	Punjab
33	(Spain) Édgar Méndez (2)	Bengaluru	72	(India) Vikram Partap Singh	Mumbai City	111	(India) Apuia (2)	Mohun Bagan	150	(India) Mohammed Aimen	Kerala Blasters
34	(Morocco) Alaeddine Ajaraie	NorthEast United	73	(India) David Lalhlansanga	East Bengal	112	(India) Pratik Chaudhari	Jamshedpur	151	(Morocco) Alaeddine Ajaraie (7)	NorthEast United
35	(Brazil) Allan Paulista	Hyderabad	74	(India) Brison Fernandes	Goa	113	(India) Mayakkannan	NorthEast United	152	(Scotland) Tom Aldred	Mohun Bagan SG
36	(India) Amrinder Singh	Odisha	75	(Spain) Tiri (2)	Mumbai City	114	(Uruguay) Adrián Luna	Kerala Blasters	153	(India) Irfan Yadwad (5)	Chennaiyin
37	(India) Manvir Singh	Mohun Bagan	76	(India) P.V. Vishnu (2)	East Bengal	115	(India) Naorem Mahesh Singh	East Bengal	154	(Brazil) França (2)	Mohammedan
38	(Slovenia) Luka Majcen	Punjab	77	(Morocco) Noah Sadaoui (6)	Kerala Blasters	116	(Slovenia) Luka Majcen (2)	Punjab	155	(India) Lallianzuala Chhangte (3)	Mumbai City
39	(Serbia) Dejan Dražić	Goa	78	(Spain) Guillermo Fernández	NorthEast United	117	(Australia) Jason Cummings	Mohun Bagan	156	(India) Ayush Adhikari	Hyderabad

=== Match awards (Playoffs) ===
Player of the Match
Match	Player of the Match	
Match	Player	Club
Knockout 1	(India) Suresh Singh	Bengaluru
Knockout 2	(India) Pronay Halder	Jamshedpur
Semi Final 1 (Leg 1)	(India) Namgyal Bhutia	Bengaluru
Semi Final 2 (Leg 1)	(Spain) Javi Hernández (2)	Jamshedpur
Semi Final 1 (Leg 2)	(India) Sunil Chhetri (4)	Bengaluru
Semi Final 2 (Leg 2)	(India) Apuia (3)	Mohun Bagan
Final	(Australia) Jamie Maclaren (4)	Mohun Bagan

== ISL Cup Playoffs ==
The ISL Cup Play-offs is a knockout tournament held after the regular league season.

- Format:
  - Top six teams from the league qualify for the playoffs.
  - The top two teams advance directly to the two-legged semi-finals.
  - Teams ranked 3rd to 6th play a single-legged knockout round, hosted by the higher-ranked team.
- Progression:
  - Winners of the knockout stage join the top two teams in the semi-finals.
  - Semi-finals are played over two legs to determine the finalists.
  - The tournament culminates in a single-leg final hosted by the higher-ranked league side to crown the ISL Cup winner.

=== Bracket ===
Knockout
4	NorthEast United	0
5	Jamshedpur	2
3	Bengaluru	5
6	Mumbai City	0

Semifinals
1	Mohun Bagan	1	2	3
5	Jamshedpur	2	0	2
2	Goa	0	2	2
3	Bengaluru	2	1	3

Finals
1	Mohun Bagan (a.e.t.)	2
3	Bengaluru	1

=== Knockout ===
Team 1	Score	Team 2
Bengaluru	5–0	Mumbai City
NorthEast United	0–2	Jamshedpur

=== Semi-finals ===
Team 1	Agg.	Team 2	1st leg	2nd leg
Mohun Bagan	3–2	Jamshedpur	1–2	2–0
Goa	2–3	Bengaluru	0–2	2–1

=== ISL Cup Final ===
12 April 2025
19:30 IST
Final

Mohun Bagan	2–1 (a.e.t.)	Bengaluru
Cummings 72' (pen.); Maclaren 96'	ISL; AIFF; I-League	Alberto 49' (o.g.)

Vivekananda Yuba Bharati Krirangan, Kolkata
Attendance: 59,112
Referee: Senthil Nathan S

== See also ==
- Men
  - 2024–25 I-League (Tier II)
  - 2024–25 I-League 2 (Tier III)
  - 2024–25 I-League 3 (Tier IV)
  - 2024–25 Indian State Leagues (Tier V)
  - 2025 Super Cup (April)
  - 2024 Durand Cup
  - 2025 Reliance Foundation Development League
- Women
  - 2024–25 Indian Women's League
  - 2024–25 Indian Women's League 2
