= 2023–24 Jamshedpur FC season =

7th season in existence of Jamshedpur FC

Jamshedpur FC
2023–24 season
- Chairman: Chanakya Chaudhary
- Manager: Scott Cooper till 29 Dec 2023; Khalid Jamil from 31 Dec 2023
- Stadium: JRD Tata Sports Complex
- Indian Super League: Matchday 1
- Durand Cup: Group stage
- Federation Cup: Group stage
- Super Cup: Semi-final
- Average home league attendance: 14,996
Home colours	Away colours

The 2023–24 season is the 7th season in the history of Jamshedpur Football Club and the club's 7th consecutive season in the top flight of Indian football. In addition to the domestic league, Jamshedpur will compete in this season's editions of the Durand Cup and Super Cup. The season covers the period from 1 June 2023 to 31 May 2024.

== Pre-season overview ==
=== May ===
On 18 May, the Men of Steel announced that they have been granted ICLS Premier 1 license by the All India Football Federation — the governing body of association football in India.

=== June ===
On 21 June, the Men of Steel announced the departures of Indian players, Farukh Choudhary, Laldinliana Renthlei, Boris Singh and Ishan Pandita from the club as their contracts ended on the same day.

On 29 June, the Men of Steel announced the departures of foreign recruits, Harry Sawyer, Jay Emmanuel-Thomas, Rafael Crivellaro and Dylan Fox from the club.

=== July ===
On 9 July, the Men of Steel announced the departure of their Brazilian centre-back Eli Sabiá after spending two years at the club.

On 14 July, the Men of Steel announced that they have appointed English manager Scott Cooper as the club's new head coach until 2025.

On 15 July, the Men of Steel announced that they have brought in Hezirdan Ramadani as the new assistant coach and Dragan Draskovic as the new goalkeeper coach for the 2023–24 season.

On 17 July, the Islanders were drawn in Group B for the 132nd edition of the Durand Cup, alongside Indian Navy, Jamshedpur FC and Mohammedan SC.

On 17 July, the Men of Steel announced the signing of Serbian left winger Alen Stevanović till 2025 on a two-year deal.

On 19 July, the Men of Steel announced the signing of Indian right winger Imran Khan till 2025 on a two-year deal.

On 21 July, the Men of Steel announced the signing of the French attacking midfielder Jérémy Manzorro till the end of the 2023–24 season.

On 23 July, the Durand Cup announced the fixtures of the Men of Steel and the participating clubs. Their first match of the tournament would be against Mumbai City on 8 August.

On 24 July, the Men of Steel announced the signing of the Japanese central midfielder Rei Tachikawa till the end of the 2023–24 season.

On 26 July, the Men of Steel announced the signing of Indian right back Provat Lakra till the end of the 2023–24 season.

On 29 July, the Men of Steel announced the signing of Brazilian centre-back Elsinho on a one-year contract till the end of the 2023–24 season.

=== August ===
On 1 August, the Men of Steel announced the signing of Croatian striker Petar Sliskovic on a one-year contract till the end of the 2023–24 season.

On 3 August, the Men of Steel announced the signing of Indian left winger Mohammed Sanan K from RFYC. The 19 year-old joined Jamshedpur till 2026 on a three-year deal.

On 4 August, the Men of Steel announced a 28-member reserves squad for the 2023 Durand Cup.

On 6 August, the Men of Steel announced the signing of Indian centre-back Wungngayam Muirang.

On 7 August, the Men of Steel senior team begun its pre-season at home in JFC Flatlet, Jamshedpur. The club also announced it is set to play 6-8 pre-season friendly games in preparation for the Indian Super League season.

On 8 August, the Men of Steel played their first group stage match in the Durand Cup against the reigning Indian Super League premiers Mumbai City FC, which they lost 0–5.

On 17 August, the Men of Steel played their second group stage match in the Durand Cup against Indian Navy FT, which they won 1–0. Ashley Alban Koli scored the winning goal from a header in the 70th minute, assisted by Rosangzuala.

On 17 August, the Men of Steel played their first pre-season friendly match against I-League side Gokulam Kerala, which they won 2–0. The match was abandoned due to heavy rain around the 75th-minute mark.

On 20 August, the Men of Steel played their third group stage match in the Durand Cup against Mohammedan SC, which they lost 6–0, which confirmed their exit from the tournament.

=== September ===
On 25 September, the Men of Steel played their 1st ISL match of the season at Vivekananda Yuba Bharati Krirangan against East Bengal FC that ended in a 0–0 stalemate.

=== October ===
On 5 October, the Men of Steel played their 1st home match in the JRD Tata Sports Complex against Hyderabad FC which was also their first win of the season.

On 9 October, the Men of Steel announced the departure of Croatian striker Petar Sliskovic on mutual terms.

On 9 October, the Men of Steel announced the arrival of striker Steve Ambri who played for France U20 team in 2018 Toulon Tournament. He debuted with the Guinea-Bissau national team in a 0–0 2022 FIFA World Cup qualification tie with Guinea on 12 November 2021.

=== December ===
On 30 December, the Men of Steel parted ways with Head Coach Scott Cooper. Also, they let go of assistant coach Hezirdan Ramadani and Goalkeeping coach Dragan Draskovic.

On 31 December, the Men of Steel announced that they have appointed Indian manager Khalid Jamil as the club's new head coach for the remainder of the season.

== till 29 Dec 2023 ==
Position	Name	Nationality	Year appointed	Last club/team	References
Manager	Scott Cooper	England	2023	(Thailand) Port	
Assistant Coach	Hezirdan Ramadani	Serbia	2023	Philippines U23 (as assistant coach)	
Goalkeeping Coach	Dragan Draskovic	Montenegro	2023	(Montenegro) Lovćen (as goalkeeping coach)	

== from 31 Dec 2023 ==
Position	Name	Nationality	Year appointed	Last club/team	References
Manager	Khalid Jamil	India	2023	Bengaluru United	
Assistant Coach	Steven Dias	India	2023	Jamshedpur B	
Goalkeeping Coach	Harshad Meher	India	2023	Real Kashmir (as goalkeeping coach)	

=== First-team squad ===
Notes:

- Players and squad numbers last updated on 14 September 2023.
- Appearances and goals last updated on 25 September 2023, including all competitions for senior teams.
- Flags indicate national team as defined under FIFA eligibility rules. Players may hold more than one non-FIFA nationality.
- Player^{*} – Player who joined the club permanently or on loan during the season.
- Player^{†} – Player who departed the club permanently or on loan during the season.

No.	Player	Nat.	Position(s) (Footedness)	Date of birth (age)	Signed		Transfer fee	Apps.	Goals
No.	Player	Nat.	Position(s) (Footedness)	Date of birth (age)	In	From	Transfer fee	Apps.	Goals
Goalkeepers
1	Rakshit Dagar	IND	GK (R)	16 October 1992 (age 34)	2022	(India) Gokulam Kerala	Free transfer	0	0
31	Vishal Yadav	IND	GK (R)	5 May 2002 (age 24)	2021	(India) Jamshedpur Reserves	Free transfer	13	0
32	Rehenesh TP	IND	GK (R)	13 February 1993 (age 33)	2020	(India) Kerala Blasters	Free transfer	54	0
Defenders
4	Laldinpuia	IND	CB / DM (R)	29 November 1996 (age 29)	2021	(India) Aizawl	Free transfer	16	0
6	Ricky Lallawmawma	IND	LB (L)	9 September 1991 (age 35)	2020	(India) ATK	Free transfer	67	0
12	Provat Lakra^{*}	IND	RB / LB (R)	12 August 1997 (age 29)	2023	(India) NorthEast United	Free transfer	0	0
16	Muhammad Uvais	IND	LB / CB (L)	31 July 1998 (age 28)	2022	(India) Gokulam Kerala	Free transfer	7	0
21	Wungngayam Muirang^{*}	IND	CB (L)	16 February 1999 (age 27)	2023	(India) Bengaluru	Free transfer	0	0
24	Pratik Chaudhari	IND	CB (R)	4 October 1989 (age 37)	2022	(India) Bengaluru	Free transfer	22	1
44	Saphaba Singh Telem	IND	CB / LB (L)	3 January 2003 (age 23)	2021	(India) Jamshedpur Reserves	N/A	7	0
77	Nikhil Barla	IND	RB / ST (R)	5 August 2003 (age 23)	2021	(India) Jamshedpur Reserves	N/A	8	0
91	Elsinho^{*}	BRA	CB / DM (R)	10 April 1991 (age 35)	2023	(Brazil) Portuguesa Santista	Free transfer	1	0
Midfielders
3	Jitendra Singh	IND	DM (R)	13 June 2001 (age 25)	2019	(India) Indian Arrows	Free transfer	55	1
7	Len Doungel	IND	RM (R)	3 January 1994 (age 32)	2021	(India) Goa	Free transfer	40	2
8	Rei Tachikawa^{*}	JPN	CM (R)	18 January 1998 (age 28)	2023	(Malta) Sirens	Free transfer	1	0
10	Jeremy Manzorro^{*}	FRA	AM (R)	11 November 1991 (age 35)	2023	(Poland) Sandecja	Free transfer	1	0
14	Pronay Halder	IND	DM (R)	25 February 1993 (age 33)	2023	(India) Mohun Bagan SG	Free transfer	10	0
17	Imran Khan^{*}	IND	RM / CM (L)	1 March 1995 (age 31)	2023	(India) NorthEast United	Free transfer	1	0
27	Emil Benny^{*}	IND	CM / AM (R)	19 September 2000 (age 26)	2023	(India) NorthEast United	Free transfer	1	0
28	Germanpreet Singh	IND	CM / DM (R)	24 June 1996 (age 30)	2022	(India) Chennaiyin	Free transfer	6	0
Attackers
9	Petar Sliskovic^{*}	CRO	ST (R)	21 February 1991 (age 35)	2023	(India) Chennaiyin	Free transfer	0	0
11	Komal Thatal	IND	LW (R)	18 September 2000 (age 26)	2021	(India) Mohun Bagan SG	Free transfer	8	1
15	Sanan Mohammed K^{*}	IND	LW (R)	5 April 2004 (age 22)	2023	(India) RFYC	Free transfer	2	0
18	Ritwik Das	IND	LW (R)	14 December 1996 (age 29)	2021	(India) Kerala Blasters	Free transfer	39	10
19	Semboi Haokip^{*}	IND	ST (R)	13 March 1993 (age 33)	2023	(India) East Bengal	Free transfer	1	0
20	Alen Stevanović^{*}	SRB	LW (R)	7 January 1991 (age 35)	2023	(Serbia) IMT	Free transfer	1	0
30	Nongdamba Naorem^{*}	IND	LW (R)	2 January 2000 (age 26)	2023	(India) Mohun Bagan SG	Free transfer	1	0
39	Steve Ambri^{*}	GNB	LW / ST (L)	12 August 1997 (age 29)	2023	(France) Nîmes	Free transfer	4	1
99	Daniel Chima Chukwu	NGA	ST (R)	4 April 1991 (age 35)	2022	(India) East Bengal	Free transfer	34	12
Out on loan
27	Sk Sahil^{†}	IND	CM (R)	28 April 2000 (age 26)	2022	(India) Mohun Bagan SG	Free transfer	4	0

== New contracts and transfers ==
=== Transfers in ===
Date	No.	Pos.	Nat.	Player	Transferred from	Fee	Ref.
17 July 2023	20	FW	(Serbia)	Alen Stevanović	(Serbia) IMT (Serbian SuperLiga)	Free transfer	
19 July 2023	17	MF	(India)	Imran Khan	(India) NorthEast United (Indian Super League)	Free transfer	
21 July 2023	10	MF	(France)	Jeremy Manzorro	(Poland) Sandecja (II liga)	Free transfer	
24 July 2023	8	MF	(Japan)	Rei Tachikawa	(Malta) Sirens (Maltese Premier League)	Free transfer	
26 July 2023	12	DF	(India)	Provat Lakra	(India) NorthEast United (Indian Super League)	Free transfer	
29 July 2023	91	DF	(Brazil)	Elsinho	(Brazil) Portuguesa Santista (Paulista Série A2)	Free transfer	
1 August 2023	9	FW	(Croatia)	Petar Sliskovic	(India) Chennaiyin (Indian Super League)	Free transfer	
3 August 2023	15	MF	(India)	Sanan Mohammed K	(India) RFYC (Youth leagues)	Free transfer	
6 August 2023	21	DF	(India)	Wungngayam Muirang	(India) Bengaluru (Indian Super League)	Free transfer	
1 September 2023	27	MF	(India)	Emil Benny	(India) NorthEast United (Indian Super League)	Free transfer	
14 September 2023	30	FW	(India)	Nongdamba Naorem	(India) Mohun Bagan SG (Indian Super League)	Free transfer	
14 September 2023	21	FW	(India)	Semboi Haokip	(India) East Bengal (Indian Super League)	Free transfer	
9 October 2023	39	FW	(Guinea-Bissau)	Steve Ambri	(France) Nîmes (Championnat National)	Free transfer	

=== Transfers out ===
Date	No.	Pos.	Nat.	Player	Transferred to	Fee	Ref.
21 June 2023	26	DF	(India)	Laldinliana Renthlei	(India) Odisha (Indian Super League)	Free transfer	
21 June 2023	2	FW	(India)	Boris Singh	(India) Goa (Indian Super League)	Free transfer	
21 June 2023	9	FW	(India)	Ishan Pandita	(India) Kerala Blasters (Indian Super League)	Free transfer	
21 June 2023	17	FW	(India)	Farukh Choudhary	(India) Chennaiyin (Indian Super League)	Free transfer	
29 June 2023	8	FW	(Australia)	Harry Sawyer	(Finland) VPS (Veikkausliiga)	Free transfer	
29 June 2023	10	MF	(England)	Jay Emmanuel-Thomas		Free transfer	
29 June 2023	50	MF	(Brazil)	Rafael Crivellaro	(India) Chennaiyin (Indian Super League)	Free transfer	
29 June 2023	12	DF	(Australia)	Dylan Fox		Free transfer	
9 July 2023	13	DF	(Brazil)	Eli Sabiá	(India) Sreenidi Deccan (I-League)	Free transfer	
16 September 2023	89	MF	(India)	Phijam Vikash Singh	(India) Inter Kashi (I-League)	Free transfer	
16 September 2023	46	MF	(India)	Angelo Singh Keisam	(India) Inter Kashi (I-League)	Free transfer	

== Pre-season and friendlies ==
On 7 August 2023, Jamshedpur announced that they would play 6-8 pre-season friendly games in preparation for the Indian Super League season in September. The team will set up their base in JFC Flatlets, Jamshedpur, from 7 August.

=== Friendlies ===
Win Draw Loss Fixtures

17 August 2023 Friendly	Jamshedpur	2–0	Gokulam Kerala	Jamshedpur, Jharkhand
18:00 IST	Tachikawa; Stevanović	Report		Stadium: Flatlets Training Ground
Note: The match was abandoned due to heavy rain around the 75th-minute mark.

29 August 2023 Friendly	Sreenidi Deccan	2–1	Jamshedpur	Hyderabad, Telangana
15:30 IST	Lewis 40'; Sissoko 65'	Report	I. Khan 13'	Stadium: Deccan Arena

1 September 2023 Friendly	Bengaluru	3–2	Jamshedpur	Hyderabad, Telangana
IST	Bhutia; (o.g.); R. Yadav	Report	Chaudhari; Das (pen.)	Stadium: Deccan Arena

9 September 2023 Friendly	Jamshedpur	1–0	NorthEast United	Jamshedpur, Jharkhand
18:00 IST	Semboi	Report		Stadium: Flatlets Training Ground
Note: Thongkhosiem Haokip was on trial with Jamshedpur.

11 September 2023 Friendly	Jamshedpur	2–2	NorthEast United	Jamshedpur, Jharkhand
17:00 IST	Doungel; Semboi	Report	B. Oram; M. Singh	Stadium: Flatlets Training Ground
Note: Thongkhosiem Haokip was on trial with Jamshedpur.

19 September 2023 Friendly	Jamshedpur	10–0	Sikkim Aakraman	Jamshedpur, Jharkhand
IST		Report		Stadium: Flatlets Training Ground

== Competitions ==
=== Overall record ===
Competition	First match	Last match	Starting round	Final position	Record							
Competition	First match	Last match	Starting round	Final position	Pld	W	D	L	GF	GA	GD	Win %
Indian Super League	25 September 2023	TBD	Matchday 1	TBD	22	5	6	11	27	32	−5	22.73
Durand Cup	8 August 2023	20 August 2023	Group stage	Group stage	3	1	0	2	1	11	−10	33.33
Super Cup	10 January 2024	24 January 2024	Group stage	Semi-finals	4	3	0	1	7	5	+2	75.00
Total					29	9	6	14	35	48	−13	31.03

Source: Soccerway

=== Durand Cup ===
==== Group stage ====
Pos	Team	Pld	W	D	L	GF	GA	GD	Pts	Qualification	MCI	MSC	JAM	INV
1	Mumbai City	3	3	0	0	12	1	+11	9	Qualify for the knockout stage	—	—	5–0	4–0
2	Mohammedan (H)	3	2	0	1	9	4	+5	6		1–3	—	6–0	2–1
3	Jamshedpur	3	1	0	2	1	11	−10	3		—	—	—	1–0
4	Indian Navy	3	0	0	3	1	7	−6	0		—	—	—	—

Source: Twitter
Rules for classification: Group stage tiebreakers
(H) Hosts

==== Matches ====
The fixtures were announced on 22 July 2023. Jamshedpur were drawn in Group B for the 132nd edition of the Durand Cup.

Win Draw Loss

8 August 2023 Group stage	Mumbai City	5–0	Jamshedpur	Kolkata, West Bengal
18.00 IST	Díaz 8', 14'; Noguera 40'; van Nieff 47'; V. Singh 55'	Report		Stadium: Vivekananda Yuba Bharati Krirangan; Referee: Pranjal Banerjee; Man of the Match: Lalengmawia Ralte (Mumbai City)

17 August 2023 Group stage	Jamshedpur	1–0	Indian Navy	Kolkata, West Bengal
15.00 IST	L. Chawngthu (penalty missed) 42'; A. Koli 70'	Report	Jijo F (yellow card) 71'; Britto (yellow card) 73'; S. Singh (yellow card) 89'	Stadium: Mohun Bagan Ground; Attendance: 56; Referee: Aditya Purkayastha; Man of the Match: Ashley Alban Koli (Jamshedpur)

20 August 2023 Group stage	Mohammedan	6–0	Jamshedpur	Kolkata, West Bengal
16.45 IST	Lalremsanga 10', 16'; D. Lalhlansanga 28', 69', 82', 89'; Mallick (yellow card) 74'	Report	A. Koli (penalty missed) 65'; Sahil (yellow card) 90+4'	Stadium: Kishore Bharati Krirangan; Attendance: 3,297; Referee: K Ramdasan; Man of the Match: David Lalhlansanga (Mohammedan)

=== Indian Super League ===
==== League table ====
Pos	Team	Pld	W	D	L	GF	GA	GD	Pts	Qualification
8	Punjab	22	6	6	10	28	35	−7	24 (Note: Head-to-head points: Punjab 4, East Bengal 1.)	
9	East Bengal	22	6	6	10	27	29	−2	24	Qualification for the Champions League Two preliminary stage (Note: East Bengal qualified for the AFC Champions League Two preliminary stage by winning the 2024 Super Cup.)
10	Bengaluru	22	5	7	10	20	34	−14	22	
11	Jamshedpur	22	5	6	11	27	32	−5	21	
12	Hyderabad	22	1	5	16	10	43	−33	8	

Source: Indian Super League
Rules for classification: 1) points; 2) head-to-head points; 3) head-to-head goal difference; 4) head-to-head goals scored; 5) goal difference; 6) number of goals scored; 7) fair play ranking

==== Results summary ====
Overall								Home						Away					
Pld	W	D	L	GF	GA	GD	Pts	W	D	L	GF	GA	GD	W	D	L	GF	GA	GD
18	5	5	8	23	23	0	20	2	4	2	9	9	0	3	1	6	14	14	0

Last updated: 1 December 2023.
Source: Indian Super League

==== League results by round ====
Round	1	2	3	4	5	6	7	8	9	10	11	12	13	14	15	16	17	18	19	20	21	22
Ground	A	A	H	H	A	H	A	H	H	A	A	A	H	A	H	A	H	A	H	H	A	H
Result	D	L	W	D	L	L	L	L	D	L	W	L	D	W	D	W	W	L	L	D	L	L
Position	6	8	8	6	8	9	10	10	10	10	10	10	11	6	8	6	6	8	11	11	11	11
Points	1	1	4	5	5	5	5	5	6	6	9	9	10	13	14	17	20	20	20	21	21	21

Source: Indian Super League
A = Away; H = Home; W = Win; D = Draw; L = Loss
Notes: Positions show the situation at the end of the corresponding Game Weeks (GW), not the position at the conclusion of matches or game days.

The first twelve league fixtures were announced on 7 September 2023.

Win Draw Loss Fixtures

25 September 2023 1	East Bengal	0–0	Jamshedpur	Kolkata, West Bengal
20:00 IST	Chakrabarti (yellow card) 30'; Crespo (yellow card) 90+6'	Report	Halder (yellow card) 26'; Naorem (yellow card) 41'; Barla (yellow card) 80'; Benny (yellow card) 90+6'	Stadium: Vivekananda Yuba Bharati Krirangan; Attendance: 11,143; Referee: I Jamal Mohamed

1 October 2023 2	Kerala Blasters	1–0	Jamshedpur	Kochi, Kerala
20:00 IST	J. Singh (yellow card) 60'; Luna 74'; Dohling (yellow card) 90+5'	Report	Doungel (yellow card) 37'; Lallawmawma (yellow card) 66'; Halder (yellow card) 82'	Stadium: Jawaharlal Nehru Stadium; Attendance: 34,518; Referee: R Venkatesh

5 October 2023 3	Jamshedpur	1–0	Hyderabad	Jamshedpur, Jharkhand
20:00 IST	Halder (yellow card) 13'; Stevanović (yellow card) 60'; Tachikawa 76'	Report	N. Dorjee (yellow card) 75'	Stadium: JRD Tata Sports Complex; Attendance: 21,238; Referee: Harish Kundu

22 October 2023 4	Jamshedpur	0–0	Punjab	Jamshedpur, Jharkhand
20:00 IST	Chaudhari (yellow card) 62'; J. Singh (yellow card) 83'	Report	Assisi (yellow card) 43'; Chatziisaias (yellow card) 45+1'; Majcen (yellow card) 54'; Prabhu (yellow card) 90'	Stadium: JRD Tata Sports Complex; Attendance: 21,962; Referee: Senthil Nathan

26 October 2023 5	NorthEast United	2–1	Jamshedpur	Guwahati, Assam
20:00 IST	Zabaco 90+4'; Melo 90+9' (pen.)	Report	Chaudhari (yellow card) 9'; Chukwu (penalty missed) 19' 19'; Stevanović (yellow card) 85'; Barla (yellow card) 87'	Stadium: Indira Gandhi Athletic Stadium; Attendance: 7,739; Referee: Pratik Mondal

1 November 2023 6	Jamshedpur	2–3	Mohun Bagan SG	Jamshedpur, Jharkhand
20:00 IST	Sanan 6'; Barla (yellow card) 45+4'; Chukwu (yellow card) 54'; J. Singh (yellow card) 64'; Rehenesh (red card) 67'; Semboi (yellow card) 82'; Benny (yellow card) 84'; Ambri 86' (pen.)	Report	Sadiku 29' (yellow card) 69'; M. Singh (yellow card) 40'; Colaco 48'; Nassiri 80'; Yuste (yellow card) 85'	Stadium: JRD Tata Sports Complex; Attendance: 23,190; Referee: Aditya Purkayastha

27 November 2023 7	Goa	1–0	Jamshedpur	Margao, Goa
20:00 IST	Fernandes (yellow card) 26'; Rodríguez 82' (yellow card) 84'	Report	Chaudhari (yellow card) 49'; Ambri (yellow card) 61'; Laldinpuia (yellow card) 69'; Manzorro (yellow card) 84'	Stadium: Fatorda Stadium; Attendance: 8,127; Referee: Harish Kundu

1 December 2023 8	Jamshedpur	0–1	Odisha	Jamshedpur, Jharkhand
20:00 IST	Elsinho (yellow card) 64'	Report	Krishna 56' (yellow card) 79'	Stadium: JRD Tata Sports Complex; Attendance: 19,296; Referee: Rahul Kumar Gupta

7 December 2023 9	Jamshedpur	2–2	Chennaiyin	Jamshedpur, Jharkhand
20:00 IST	Laldinpuia 45+4'; Daniel Chima Chukwu 90'		Farukh Choudhary 9'; Meitei 40'	Stadium: JRD Tata Sports Complex; Attendance: 7,134

16 December 2023 10	Bengaluru	1–0	Jamshedpur	Bengaluru, Karnataka
17:30 IST				Stadium: Sree Kanteerava Stadium

21 December 2023 11	Hyderabad	0–5	Jamshedpur	Hyderabad, Goa
20:00 IST				Stadium: GMC Balayogi Athletic Stadium

29 December 2023 12	Odisha	4–1	Jamshedpur	Bhubaneswar, Odisha
17:30 IST				Stadium: Kalinga Stadium

31 January 2024 13	Jamshedpur	1–1	NorthEast United	Jamshedpur, Jharkhand
19:30 IST	Imran 33'; Lakra (yellow card) 70'; Tachikawa (yellow card) 74'; Sanan (yellow card) 85'	Report	Akhtar (yellow card) 30'; Bemammer 66'	Stadium: JRD Tata Sports Complex; Attendance: 10,132

4 February 2024 14	Mumbai	2–3	Jamshedpur	Mumbai, Maharashtra
19:30 IST	Tiri 14'; Yoell van Nieff (yellow card) 24'; Noguera 32'; Noguera (yellow card) 54'; Mehtab (yellow card) 90+10'	Report	Len (yellow card) 36'; Tachikawa (yellow card) 41'; Lakra (yellow card) 50'; Imran 55'; Manzorro 59'; Manzorro 87' (pen.)	Stadium: Mumbai Football Arena; Attendance: 2,087; Man of the Match: Jérémy Manzorro

11 February 2024 15	Jamshedpur	1–1	Bengaluru	Jamshedpur, Jharkhand
19:30 IST	Siverio 70'; Imran (yellow card) 45'; Yamboi (yellow card) 66'; Pratik (yellow card) 82'; Siverio (yellow card) 90+8'	Report	Suresh 14'; Suresh (yellow card) 40'; Rohit (yellow card) 74'; Gurpreet (yellow card) 90+8'	Stadium: JRD Tata Sports Complex; Attendance: 12,605; Man of the Match: Imran Khan

15 February 2024 16	Punjab	0–4	Jamshedpur	New Delhi, Delhi
19:30 IST	Majcen (penalty missed) 13'		Chima 11'; Uvais (yellow card) 36'; Sanan 63'; Manzorro 83'; Manzorro 86'	Stadium: Jawaharlal Nehru Stadium; Man of the Match: Jérémy Manzorro

22 February 2024 17	Jamshedpur	2–1	East Bengal	Jamshedpur, Jharkhand
19:30 IST	Len (yellow card) 66'; Rei 81'; Manzorro 90+7'		Nandhakumar 45'; Ajay Chhetri (yellow card) 55'; Mahesh (yellow card) 83'; Rakip (yellow card) 90+5'	Stadium: JRD Tata Sports Complex; Attendance: 15,611; Referee: Crystal John; Man of the Match: Jérémy Manzorro

1 March 2024 18	Mohun Bagan	3-0	Jamshedpur	Kolkata, West Bengal
19:30 IST				Stadium: Vivekananda Yuba Bharati Krirangan

8 March 2024 19	Jamshedpur	0-3	Mumbai	Jamshedpur, Jharkhand
19:30 IST				Stadium: JRD Tata Sports Complex

30 March 2024 20	Jamshedpur	1–1	Kerala Blasters	Jamshedpur, Jharkhand
19:30 IST	Chaudhari (yellow card) 7'; Siverio 45'; Stevanović (yellow card) 90+4'	Report	Diamantakos 23'; Justine (yellow card) 30'; Lešković (yellow card) 52'; Danish (yellow card) 60'; Rahul (yellow card) 75'; Drinčić (yellow card) 81'	Stadium: JRD Tata Sports Complex; Attendance: 10,331; Referee: Pratik Mondal; Man of the Match: Javier Siverio (Jamshedpur)

4 April 2024 21	Chennaiyin	2-1	Jamshedpur	Chennai
17:30 IST				Stadium: Jawaharlal Nehru Stadium

9 April 2024 22	Jamshedpur	2-3	Mumbai	Jamshedpur, Jharkhand
19:30 IST				Stadium: JRD Tata Sports Complex

=== Super Cup ===
==== Group stage ====
Pos	Team	Pld	W	D	L	GF	GA	GD	Pts	Qualification	JAM	NEU	KER	SHL
1	Jamshedpur	3	3	0	0	7	3	+4	9	Advance to knockout stage	—	2–1	2–3	2–0
2	NorthEast United	3	2	0	1	7	4	+3	6		—	—	4–1	2–1
3	Kerala Blasters	3	1	0	2	6	8	−2	3		—	—	—	3–1
4	Shillong Lajong	3	0	0	3	2	7	−5	0		—	—	—	—

Source: AIFF
Rules for classification: 1) points; 2) head-to-head points; 3) head-to-head goal difference; 4) goal difference; 5) number of goals scored; 6) drawing of lots

==== Matches ====
Win Draw Loss

==== Group stage ====
10 January 2024 1	NorthEast United	1–2	Jamshedpur	Bhubaneswar
19:30 IST	Néstor 17'	Report	Chima 68'; Steve 89'	Stadium: Kalinga Stadium; Man of the Match: Jérémy Manzorro (Jamshedpur)

15 January 2024 2	Kerala Blasters	2–3	Jamshedpur	Bhubaneswar
19:30 IST	Diamantakos 29' (pen.), 61' (pen.)	Report	Chima 33', 57'; Manzorro 69' (pen.)	Stadium: Kalinga Stadium; Man of the Match: Chima (Jamshedpur)

20 January 2024 3	Jamshedpur	2–0	Shillong Lajong	Bhubaneswar
14:00 IST	Sanan Mohammed K. 45+1'; Haokip 73'	Report		Stadium: Kalinga Stadium Pitch 1 Man of the Match: Sanan Mohammed K. (Jamshedpur)

=== Semi-finals ===
24 January 2024 SF1	East Bengal	2–0	Jamshedpur	Bhubaneswar
19:30 IST	Maher 17'; Siverio 47'	Report		Stadium: Kalinga Stadium

== Statistics ==
Keys
No.	Squad number	Pos.	Position
Player^{*}	Player who joined the club permanently or on loan during the season		
Player^{†}	Player who departed the club permanently or on loan during the season		

=== Appearances ===
Includes all competitions for senior teams.

As of 25 September 2023

Note: Jamshedpur fielded their reserve side for the Durand Cup, with head coach Steven Dias at the helm. As a result, the lists below include the stats of players who featured for the club in different sections of the Indian Super League, Federation Cup and the Durand Cup.

2023–24 season						Club total
No.	Pos.	Player	Indian Super League	Federation Cup	Total	Club total
1	GK	(India) Rakshit Dagar	0	0	0	0
3	MF	(India) Jitendra Singh	0	0	0	55
4	DF	(India) Laldinpuia	1	0	1	16
6	DF	(India) Ricky Lallawmawma	0+1	0	0+1	67
7	MF	(India) Len Doungel	0	0	0	40
8	MF	(Japan) Rei Tachikawa^{*}	0+1	0	0+1	1
9	FW	(Croatia) Petar Sliskovic^{*}	0	0	0	0
10	MF	(France) Jeremy Manzorro^{*}	1	0	1	1
11	FW	(India) Komal Thatal	0	0	0	8
12	DF	(India) Provat Lakra^{*}	0	0	0	0
14	MF	(India) Pronay Halder	1	0	1	10
15	FW	(India) Sanan Mohammed K^{*}	0+1	0	0+1	2
16	DF	(India) Muhammad Uvais	0	0	0	7
17	MF	(India) Imran Khan^{*}	1	0	1	1
18	FW	(India) Ritwik Das	0	0	0	39
19	FW	(India) Semboi Haokip^{*}	0+1	0	0+1	1
20	FW	(Serbia) Alen Stevanovic^{*}	1	0	1	1
21	DF	(India) Wungngayam Muirang^{*}	0	0	0	0
24	DF	(India) Pratik Chaudhari	1	0	1	22
27	MF	(India) Emil Benny^{*}	0+1	0	0+1	1
28	MF	(India) Germanpreet Singh	0	0	0	6
30	FW	(India) Nongdamba Naorem^{*}	1	0	1	1
31	GK	(India) Vishal Yadav	0	0	0	13
32	GK	(India) Rehenesh TP	1	0	1	54
44	DF	(India) Saphaba Singh Telem	0	0	0	7
77	DF	(India) Nikhil Barla	1	0	1	8
91	DF	(Brazil) Elsinho^{*}	1	0	1	1
99	FW	(Nigeria) Daniel Chima Chukwu	1	0	1	34
–	FW	(Guinea-Bissau) Steve Ambri^{*}	0	0	0	0

==== Durand Cup ====
2023–24 season					Club total
No.	Pos.	Player	Durand Cup	Total	Club total
15	MF	(India) Sanan Mohammed K	1	1	1
19	MF	(India) Armash Ansari	0+3	0+3	3
22	MF	(India) Ashley Alban Koli	3	3	3
23	DF	(India) Johnson Mathews	2	2	2
25	DF	(India) Kishan Sardar	0+1	0+1	1
27	MF	(India) Sk Sahil	3	3	4
30	FW	(India) Sadhu Marndi	1+1	1+1	2
46	FW	(India) Bivan Jyoti Laskar	2+1	2+1	3
47	GK	(India) Mohit Singh Dhami	2+1	2+1	8
48	GK	(India) Ayush Jena	1	1	1
49	MF	(India) Sonam Tsewang Lhokham	0	0	0
54	FW	(India) Alvies Bastin	0	0	0
57	MF	(India) Amzard Khan	2+1	2+1	3
59	MF	(India) Moirangthem Marjit Singh	2+1	2+1	3
60	DF	(India) Sairem Sital Singh	3	3	3
62	DF	(India) Pallujam Rohan Singh	3	3	3
64	MF	(India) Bhaskar Chhetri	0+1	0+1	1
66	DF	(India) Meraimayum Raju	0+1	0+1	1
67	MF	(India) Asem Maingou Singh	1+2	1+2	3
68	MF	(India) Lalriathpuia Chawngthu	1+1	1+1	2
69	DF	(India) Rosangzuala	3	3	3
71	MF	(India) Laishram Rameshor Meetei	0+1	0+1	1
72	MF	(India) Ningthoujam Mahesh Singh	0	0	0
73	DF	(India) Zonunpuia	2	2	2
81	FW	(India) Lawmsangzuala	0	0	0
89	MF	(India) Phijam Vikash Singh	1	1	12
97	GK	(India) Luckystar Lawai	0	0	0
99	GK	(India) Raj Boro	0	0	0

==== Goals ====
The list is sorted by squad number when season-total goals are equal. Players with no goals are not included in the list.

As of 5 October 2023

2023–24 season							Club total
Rk.	No.	Pos.	Player	Indian Super League	Durand Cup	Total	Club total
1	8	MF	(Japan) Rei Tachikawa	1	–	1	1
1	22	MF	(India) Ashley Alban Koli	0	1	1	1
Own goal(s)				0	0	0	—
Total				1	1	2	2

==== Assists ====
The list is sorted by squad number when total assists are equal. Players with no assists are not included in the list.

As of 5 October 2023

2023–24 season						Club total
Rk.	No.	Pos.	Player	Durand Cup	Total	Club total
1	69	DF	(India) Rosangzuala	1	1	1
Total				1	1	1

=== Clean sheets ===
Includes all competitions. The list is sorted by squad number when total clean sheets are equal. Numbers in parentheses represent games where both goalkeepers participated and both kept a clean sheet; the number in parentheses is awarded to the goalkeeper who was substituted on, whilst a full clean sheet is awarded to the goalkeeper who was on the field at the start of play. Goalkeepers with no clean sheets not included in the list.

As of 22 October 2023

Rk.	No.	Goalkeeper	Indian Super League	Federation Cup	Durand Cup	Total
1	32	(India) Rehenesh TP	3	0	0	3
2	47	(India) Mohit Singh Dhami	0	0	0 (1)	0 (1)
2	48	(India) Ayush Jena	0	0	1	1
Total			3	0	1	4
