= Wungngayam Muirang =

Indian footballer

Personal information
- Date of birth: 16 February 1999 (age 27)
- Place of birth: Ukhrul, Manipur
- Height: 1.84 m (6 ft 1/2 in)
- Position: Centre-back

Team information
- Current team: Gokulam Kerala
- Number: 21

Senior career*
Years	Team	Apps	(Gls)
2017–2018	Pune City B	7	(0)
2018–2020	Gokulam Kerala	11	(0)
2020–2023	Bengaluru	7	(0)
2023–2025	Jamshedpur	11	(0)
2025–2026	Diamond Harbour		
2026–	Gokulam Kerala	0	(0)

International career
2018	India U23		
- * Club domestic league appearances and goals as of 12:56, 28 January 2025 (UTC)

Wungngayam Muirang (born 16 February 1999), also known as Yamboi Muirang, is an Indian footballer who plays as a defender for Indian Football League club Gokulam Kerala.

== Career ==
=== Gokulam Kerala ===
In October 2018, it was announced that Wungngayam Muirang signed for Gokulam Kerala in the I-League.

== International ==
On 13 February 2019, Muirang was called up to the India under-23 side which participated in the 2020 AFC U-23 Championship qualifiers.

== Career statistics ==
=== Club ===
As of 28 January 2025

Club	Season	League			Cup		Continental		Total	
Club	Season	Division	Apps	Goals	Apps	Goals	Apps	Goals	Apps	Goals
Pune City B	2017–18	I-League 2nd Division	7	0	0	0	—		7	0
Gokulam Kerala	2018–19	I-League	5	0	0	0	—		5	0
Gokulam Kerala	2019–20	I-League	6	0	0	0	2 (Note: Appearance(s) in Sheikh Kamal International Club Cup)	0	8	0
Gokulam Kerala	Total		11	0	0	0	2	0	13	0
Bengaluru	2020–21	Indian Super League	2	0	0	0	—		2	0
Bengaluru	2021–22	Indian Super League	5	0	5 (Note: Appearance(s) in Durand Cup)	1	—		10	1
Bengaluru	2022–23	Indian Super League	0	0	2	0	—		2	0
Bengaluru	Total		7	0	7	1	0	0	14	1
Jamshedpur	2023–24	Indian Super League	5	0	3 (Note: Appearance(s) in Super Cup)	0	—		8	0
Jamshedpur	2024–25	Indian Super League	6	0	3	1	—		9	1
Jamshedpur	Total		11	0	6	1	0	0	17	1
Diamond Harbour	2025–26	I-League	0	0	0	0	—		0	0
Career total			36	0	13	2	2	0	51	2

== Honours ==
Gokulam Kerala

- Durand Cup: 2019

Bengaluru

- Durand Cup: 2022
