= Jérémy Manzorro =

French footballer (born 1991)

Personal information
- Full name: Jérémy Philippe Bernad Manzorro
- Date of birth: 11 November 1991 (age 35)
- Place of birth: Villeurbanne, France
- Height: 1.73 m (5 ft 8 in)
- Positions: Midfielder; winger

Youth career
- Gueugnon

Senior career*
Years	Team	Apps	(Gls)
2009–2012	Stade Reims B	54	(14)
2010–2012	Stade Reims	2	(0)
2012–2013	Bourg-Péronnas	18	(0)
2013–2014	Chernomorets Burgas	30	(3)
2014–2016	Slavia Sofia	45	(11)
2016	→ Anorthosis (loan)	8	(0)
2017	Paykan	1	(0)
2017	Sūduva	10	(0)
2018	Žalgiris	25	(2)
2019	Irtysh Pavlodar	26	(6)
2020	Shakhter Karagandy	3	(1)
2020–2021	Tobol	35	(6)
2022–2023	Astana	19	(0)
2023	Sandecja Nowy Sącz	5	(0)
2023–2024	Jamshedpur	20	(5)
2024–2025	Mumbai City	9	(0)
2026	IMT	1	(0)
- * Club domestic league appearances and goals as of 11:50, 1 February 2026 (UTC)

Jérémy Philippe Bernad Manzorro (born 11 November 1991) is a French professional footballer who plays as a midfielder.

== Career ==
Born in Villeurbanne, Manzorro started his senior career at Stade de Reims. He made his first-team debut on 13 May 2011, coming on as a second-half substitute in a 1–1 away draw against Clermont Foot in the Ligue 2. In 2012, Manzorro joined Bourg-Péronnas in the Championnat National.

=== Chernomorets Burgas ===
In July 2013, after a successful trial, Manzorro signed for Bulgarian side Chernomorets Burgas. In the 2013–14 season, he earned 30 appearances in the Bulgarian A group, scoring three goals. Manzorro's contract was terminated at the end of the season after Chernomorets finished in 11th place and relegated to B group.

=== Slavia Sofia ===
On 9 June 2014, Manzorro signed for Slavia Sofia as a free agent. His first goal for Slavia came on 3 December when he scored in a 2–2 home draw against Cherno More Varna in the Bulgarian Cup. On 13 December, he scored his first hat-trick in Bulgaria, scoring all three of his team's goals in a 3–1 home league win over Levski Sofia.

=== Irtysh Pavlodar ===
On 13 January 2019, Manzorro signed for Irtysh Pavlodar.

=== Shakhter Karagandy ===
On 12 February 2020, Manzorro signed for Shakhter Karagandy, before signing for FC Tobol on 4 August 2020.

=== Astana ===
On 16 February 2022, Astana announced the signing of Manzorro. In January 2023, the contract was terminated by mutual agreement.

=== Sandecja Nowy Sącz ===
On 14 March 2023, Manzorro joined Polish I liga side Sandecja Nowy Sącz until the end of the season, with an option to extend his deal for another year.

=== Jamshedpur FC ===
On 21 July 2023, Manzorro joined Indian Super League club Jamshedpur FC on a one-year deal. On 15 February 2024, he scored two free-kicks in a 4–0 away win against Punjab FC in the league. On 22 February 2024, he scored the winner in a 2–1 league home win against East Bengal.

=== Mumbai City FC ===
On 25 June 2024, fellow ISL club Mumbai City FC announced the signing of Manzorro on a one-year contract. He made his debut in the first match of the season against Mohun Bagan SG, coming off the bench in the first half of the match, replacing another new signing, Jon Toral. However, he was substituted off in the 85th minute, making way for Brandon Fernandes.

=== IMT ===
After leaving Mumbai City upon the expiry of his contract, Manzorro signed for Serbian SuperLiga club IMT on 6 January 2026.

== Career statistics ==
As of match played 9 November 2024

Appearances and goals by club, season and competition
Club	Season	League			National cup (Note: Includes Coupe de France, Bulgarian Cup, Cypriot Cup, Lithuanian Football Cup, Kazakhstan Cup, Super Cup)		Continental		Other		Total	
Club	Season	Division	Apps	Goals	Apps	Goals	Apps	Goals	Apps	Goals	Apps	Goals
Stade de Reims B	2009–10	CFA 2	11	4	—		—		—		11	4
Stade de Reims B	2010–11	CFA 2	15	5	—		—		—		15	5
Stade de Reims B	2011–12	CFA 2	28	5	—		—		—		28	5
Stade de Reims B	Total		54	14	—		—		—		54	14
Stade de Reims	2010–11	Ligue 2	2	0	0	0	—		—		2	0
Stade de Reims	2011–12	Ligue 2	0	0	1	0	—		—		1	0
Stade de Reims	Total		2	0	1	0	—		—		3	0
Bourg-Péronnas	2012–13	National	18	0	0	0	—		—		18	0
Chernomorets Burgas	2013–14	Parva liga	30	3	2	0	—		—		32	3
Slavia Sofia	2014–15	Parva liga	30	8	2	1	—		—		32	9
Slavia Sofia	2015–16	Parva liga	15	3	1	1	—		—		16	4
Slavia Sofia	Total		45	11	3	2	—		—		48	13
Anorthosis Famagusta (loan)	2015–16	Cypriot First Division	8	0	1	0	—		—		9	0
Paykan	2016–17	Persian Gulf Pro League	1	0	0	0	—		—		1	0
Sūduva	2017	A Lyga	10	0	2	1	2 (Note: Appearances in UEFA Europa League)	0	—		14	1
Žalgiris	2018	A Lyga	25	2	5	0	6	0	—		36	2
Irtysh Pavlodar	2019	Kazakhstan Premier League	26	6	1	0	—		—		27	6
Shakhter Karagandy	2020	Kazakhstan Premier League	3	1	0	0	—		—		3	1
Tobol	2020	Kazakhstan Premier League	15	4	0	0	—		—		15	4
Tobol	2021	Kazakhstan Premier League	20	2	5	1	2 (Note: Appearances in UEFA Europa Conference League)	0	2 (Note: Appearances in Kazakhstan Super Cup)	0	29	3
Tobol	Total		35	6	5	1	2	0	2	0	44	7
Astana	2022	Kazakhstan Premier League	19	0	4	3	2	0	—		25	3
Sandecja Nowy Sącz	2022–23	I liga	5	0	—		—		—		5	0
Jamshedpur	2023–24	Indian Super League	20	5	4	1	—		—		24	6
Mumbai City	2024–25	Indian Super League	6	0	0	0	—		—		6	0
Career total			307	48	28	8	12	0	2	0	349	56

== Honours ==
Sūduva

- A Lyga: 2017

Žalgiris

- Lithuanian Football Cup: 2018

Tobol

- Kazakhstan Premier League: 2021
- Kazakhstan Super Cup: 2021

Astana

- Kazakhstan Premier League: 2022
