= Rei Tachikawa =

Japanese footballer

Personal information
- Date of birth: 18 January 1998 (age 28)
- Place of birth: Kannami, Shizuoka, Japan
- Height: 1.78 m (5 ft 10 in)
- Position: Central midfielder

Youth career
- 2013–2015: Júbilo Iwata

College career
Years	Team	Apps	(Gls)
2016–2018	Osaka University HSS		

Senior career*
Years	Team	Apps	(Gls)
2018–2019	Perafita	?	(?)
2019	Felgueiras 1932	6	(1)
2019–2021	Santa Lucia	32	(9)
2021–2023	Sirens	31	(2)
2023–2026	Jamshedpur	62	(9)
2026–	PT Prachuap	0	(0)
- * Club domestic league appearances and goals as of 23:00, 21 May 2026 (UTC)

Rei Tachikawa (Japanese: 立川玲; born 18 January 1998) is a Japanese professional footballer who plays as a midfielder for Thai League 1 club PT Prachuap.

He started his career at Osaka Uni H&SS in his native Japan and then went on to play for European clubs like FC Perafita, Felgueiras 1932, and Santa Lucia.

== Club career ==
=== Jamshedpur ===
On 24 June 2023, Indian Super League club Jamshedpur announced the signing of Tachikawa on a one-year deal. On 26 June 2024, he extended his contract with the club until 2026.

== Career statistics ==
=== Club ===
As of match played 15 February 2026

Appearances and goals by club, season and competition
Club	Season	League			National cup (Note: Includes Maltese FA Trophy, AIFF Super Cup)		Continental		Other		Total	
Club	Season	Division	Apps	Goals	Apps	Goals	Apps	Goals	Apps	Goals	Apps	Goals
F.C. Felgueiras 1932	2018–19	Campeonato de Portugal	6	1	—		—		—		6	1
Santa Lucia	2019–20	Maltese Premier League	15	6	2	0	—		—		17	6
Santa Lucia	2020–21	Maltese Premier League	17	3	2	0	—		—		19	3
Santa Lucia	Total		32	9	4	0	—		—		36	9
Sirens	2021–22	Maltese Premier League	8	0	—		—		—		8	0
Sirens	2022–23	Maltese Premier League	23	2	2	0	—		—		25	2
Sirens	Total		31	2	2	0	0	0	0	0	33	2
Jamshedpur	2023–24	Indian Super League	22	5	4	0	—		—		26	5
Jamshedpur	2024–25	Indian Super League	27	3	4	1	—		2 (Note: Appearances in Durand Cup)	0	33	4
Jamshedpur	2025–26	Indian Super League	13	1	2	0	—		2	0	17	1
Jamshedpur	Total		62	9	10	1	0	0	4	0	76	10
PT Prachaup	2026–27	Thai League 1	0	0	0	0	—		—		0	0
Career total			131	21	16	1	0	0	4	0	151	22

== Honours ==
Jamshedpur FC

- Super Cup runner-up: 2025 (April)
