= Nikhil Barla =

Indian footballer (born 2003)

Personal information
- Full name: Nikhil Barla
- Date of birth: 5 August 2003 (age 23)
- Place of birth: Khunti, Jharkhand, India
- Height: 1.70 m (5 ft 7 in)
- Position: Right-back

Team information
- Current team: NorthEast United

Youth career
- 2018–2021: Tata Football Academy
- 2021–2022: Jamshedpur B

Senior career*
Years	Team	Apps	(Gls)
2021–2022	Jamshedpur B	7	(1)
2022–2026	Jamshedpur	55	(1)
2026–	NorthEast United	4	(0)

International career^{‡}
2025–	India U23	1	(0)
2026–	India	3	(0)
- * Club domestic league appearances and goals as of 30 October 2026 ‡ National team caps and goals as of 20:00, 9 June 2026 (UTC)

Nikhil Barla (born 5 August 2003) is an Indian professional footballer who plays as a defender for Indian Super League club NorthEast United and the India national team.

== Club career ==
Barla joined the Tata Football Academy in 2018, where he remained until joining Jamshedpur in 2021. He began his professional career with Jamshedpur in 2021. In the 2020–21 season, he played three matches at the 2021 Durand Cup.

In the following season, he did not play for the senior team, instead playing at the 2022 Development League for the youth team. In a match against Bengaluru he scored a goal, his first in his career. Since the 2022–23 season, he became an important part of the Jamshedpur senior team, having played in almost every matches in the ISL.

== International career ==
In May 2025, India under-23 head coach Naushad Moosa listed Barla in the 29-members probable squad for two friendlies that will be held in Tajikistan in June 2025.

== Career statistics ==
=== Club ===
As of 3 May 2025

Club	Season	League			National Cup		League Cup		Continental		Total	
Club	Season	Division	Apps	Goals	Apps	Goals	Apps	Goals	Apps	Goals	Apps	Goal
Jamshedpur B	2022	RFDL	7	1	–		–		–		7	1
Jamshedpur	2021–22	Indian Super League	0	0	–		3 (Note: Appearance(s) in Durand Cup)	0	–		3	0
Jamshedpur	2022–23	Indian Super League	1	0	–		3	0	–		4	0
Jamshedpur	2023–24	Indian Super League	19	0	2 (Note: Appearance(s) in Super Cup)	0	–		–		21	0
Jamshedpur	2024–25	Indian Super League	22	1	3	0	2	0	–		27	1
Jamshedpur	Total		42	1	5	0	8	0	0	0	55	1
Total			49	2	5	0	8	0	0	0	62	2

=== International ===
As of 9 June 2026

National team	Year	Apps	Goals
India	2026	3	0
Total		3	0
