= Javier Siverio =

Spanish footballer (born 1997)

Personal information
- Full name: Javier Siverio Toro
- Date of birth: 14 November 1997 (age 28)
- Place of birth: Santa Cruz de Tenerife, Spain
- Height: 1.82 m (6 ft 0 in)
- Position: Forward

Team information
- Current team: PSMS Medan
- Number: 9

Youth career
- Laguna
- 2015–2016: Las Palmas

Senior career*
Years	Team	Apps	(Gls)
2015	Laguna		
2016–2018	Las Palmas C	7	(3)
2017	Las Palmas B	14	(3)
2018–2020	Racing Santander B	48	(40)
2019–2021	Racing Santander	9	(2)
2021	Las Palmas B	16	(3)
2021–2023	Hyderabad	45	(12)
2023–2024	East Bengal	10	(0)
2024	→ Jamshedpur (loan)	8	(3)
2024–2025	Jamshedpur	26	(7)
2025	Goa	0	(0)
2026	Ethnikos	14	(0)
2026–	PSMS Medan	7	(11)
- * Club domestic league appearances and goals as of 25 October 2026

Javier Siverio Toro (born 14 November 1997) is a Spanish professional footballer who plays as a forward for Championship club PSMS Medan.

== Club career ==
Siverio was born in Santa Cruz de Tenerife, Canary Islands, and joined Las Palmas' youth setup in 2015, after already having made his senior debut with Laguna de Tenerife. He finished his formation in the following year, being initially assigned to the C-team in the regional leagues; during the season, he also appeared sparingly with the reserves, helping in their promotion to Segunda División B.

In July 2018, Siverio moved to another reserve team, Rayo Cantabria in Tercera División. On 18 November, he scored a hat-trick in a 4–3 home win against Barreda Balompié, and repeated the feat the following 17 March, in a 3–0 home success over Benzana.

Siverio made his first team debut for Racing Santander on 19 May 2019, coming on as a second-half substitute for Quique Rivero and scoring the equalizer in a 2–2 home draw against Logroñés. He also featured in a further two matches for the main squad during the play-offs as his side returned to Segunda División after a four-year absence.

On 30 June 2020, after scoring a career-best 24 goals during the campaign for the B's, Siverio signed a new contract with Racing until 2022. He made his professional debut on 4 July 2020, replacing Sergio Ruiz in a 1–2 Segunda División home loss against Elche, which ensured his team's relegation.

On 30 August 2021, Siverio joined Indian Super League side Hyderabad FC ahead of the 2021–22 ISL season.

== Personal life ==
Siverio's older brother Marco is also a footballer and a forward. He notably represented the University of Delaware's Delaware Fightin' Blue Hens and EMF Atlético Unión Güímar.

== Career statistics ==
As of match played 31 January 2026

Appearances and goals by club, season and competition
Club	Season	League			National cup (Note: Includes Copa del Rey, Super Cup, Cypriot Cup)		Continental (Note: Includes AFC Champions League Two)		Other		Total	
Club	Season	Division	Apps	Goals	Apps	Goals	Apps	Goals	Apps	Goals	Apps	Goals
Las Palmas B	2016–17	Tercera División	14	3	—		—		—		14	3
Las Palmas C	2017–18	Tercera División	7	3	—		—		—		7	3
Racing Santander B	2018–19	Tercera División	22	16	—		—		—		22	16
Racing Santander B	2019–20	Tercera División	26	24	—		—		—		26	24
Racing Santander B	Total		48	40	—		—		—		48	40
Racing Santander	2018–19	Segunda División B	1	1	—		—		2 (Note: Appearances in promotion playoffs)	0	3	1
Racing Santander	2019–20	Segunda División	5	1	—		—		—		5	1
Racing Santander	2020–21	Segunda División B	3	0	1	0	—		—		4	0
Racing Santander	Total		9	2	1	0	—		2	0	12	2
Las Palmas B	2020–21	Segunda División B	16	3	—		—		—		16	3
Hyderabad	2021–22	Indian Super League	23	7	—		—		—		23	7
Hyderabad	2022–23	Indian Super League	22	5	3	3	—		6 (Note: Appearances in Durand Cup)	1	31	9
Hyderabad	Total		45	12	3	3	—		6	1	54	16
East Bengal	2023–24	Indian Super League	10	0	5	2	—		6	2	21	4
Jamshedpur (loan)	2023–24	Indian Super League	8	3	0	0	—		0	0	8	3
Jamshedpur	2024–25	Indian Super League	26	7	4	1	—		2	2	32	10
Jamshedpur	Total		34	10	4	1	—		2	2	40	13
Goa	2025–26	Indian Super League	0	0	4	1	6	1	0	0	10	2
Ethnikos	2025–26	Cypriot First Division	4	0	1	0	—		0	0	5	0
Career total			187	73	18	7	6	1	16	5	227	86

== Honours ==
Hyderabad

- Indian Super League: 2021–22

East Bengal

- Super Cup: 2024
