= Rehenesh T. P. =

Indian footballer (born 1993)

Rehenesh TP
Personal information
- Full name: Rehenesh Thumbirumbu Paramba
- Date of birth: 13 February 1993 (age 33)
- Place of birth: Kozhikode, Kerala, India
- Height: 1.80 m (5 ft 11 in)
- Position: Goalkeeper

Team information
- Current team: Mumbai City

Youth career
- SAI Thiruvananthapuram
- Golden Threads F.C.
- Chirag United Club Kerala

Senior career*
Years	Team	Apps	(Gls)
2012–2013	ONGC	18	(0)
2013–2014	Mumbai Tigers	20	(0)
2014	→ 1 United (loan)	17	(0)
2014–2015	Shillong Lajong	15	(0)
2014	→ NorthEast United (loan)	12	(0)
2015–2019	NorthEast United	37	(0)
2016	→ East Bengal (loan)	18	(0)
2017	→ East Bengal (loan)	15	(0)
2019–2020	Kerala Blasters	13	(0)
2020–2024	Jamshedpur	70	(0)
2024–	Mumbai City	4	(0)

International career^{‡}
2015–2016	India U23	12	(0)
- * Club domestic league appearances and goals as of 09:00, 31 December 2024 (UTC) ‡ National team caps and goals as of 3 June 2019

Rehenesh Thumbirumbu Paramba (born 13 February 1993) is an Indian professional footballer who plays as a goalkeeper for Indian Super League club Mumbai City.

== Early life and career ==
He got inspired to become a footballer through his grandfather Swami, who was a goalkeeper in the local team. Before joining the Sports Authority of India, an amateur football club, Rehenesh had participated in some age group tournaments in his home state. He had also captained Sports Authority for Subroto Cup, playing as a central defender.

== Club career ==
=== Golden Threads ===
He played his first professional game in the 2011 I-League 2nd Division tournament for Golden Threads FC.

=== Chirag United Kerala ===
He joined Chirag United Club Kerala and played in a 3–0 loss against Sporting Club de Goa on 5 February 2012 which was also possibly his debut.

=== ONGC ===
Rehenesh made his professional debut for ONGC in the I-League against Pailan Arrows on 1 December 2012 coming on as a 56th-minute substitute for Bimal Minz after number one goalkeeper Prosenjit Ghosh was red carded. He made his start in next game against Sporting Club de Goa which ended in a 2–2 draw on 8 December. 6 days later, he kept his first cleansheet against Salgaocar in a goalless draw. He continued in goal for remaining league games and ended his season with six cleansheets in eighteen appearances.

=== Mumbai Tigers ===
On 14 July 2013, Rehenesh joined newly formed Mumbai Tigers who were about to compete in I-League after coach Bimal Ghosh convinced him. He made his debut at 2013 Durand Cup where he kept a cleansheet in a 4–0 win over Assam Regimental Centre.

=== Rangdajied United(loan) ===
On 14 January 2014, it was announced that Rehenesh had signed for Rangdajied United on loan for the rest of the season. He made his debut in the I-League on 11 February 2014 against Churchill Brothers at the Tilak Maidan Stadium in which he started and played the whole match as Rangdajied lost the match 1–0. He made seven appearances and kept two cleansheets.

=== Shillong Lajong ===
On 14 June 2014, it was announced that Rehenesh had signed for Shillong Lajong on a one-year deal.

==== NorthEast United(loan) ====
Rehenesh joined NorthEast United FC on loan Shillong Lajong for 2014 Indian Super League season. He made his debut in a 1–1 draw with FC Goa on 19 October 2014. He kept his first ISL cleansheet in next game against Mumbai City in a 2–0 win, which was followed by another cleansheet against Delhi Dynamos in a 0–0 stalemate. He kept five cleansheets in 12 games in inaugural ISL season.

==== 2014-15: I-League ====
He made his debut for Lajong in opening game of 2014-15 I-League season in a 2–1 loss to newly promoted Royal Wahingdoh on 18 January 2015. A week later, he kept his first cleansheet in a 1–0 victory over Mumbai. He played his last game of the season in a 2–1 loss to Sporting Goa. He kept five cleansheets for The Reds in fifteen appearances.

=== NorthEast United FC ===
In 2015, Rehenesh signed for NorthEast United on a permanent deal of one year. He made his first appearance of the season in a 3–1 loss to Kerala Blasters on 6 October. In 2015 ISL, although NorthEast United missed the semi-final berth, TP Rehenesh emerged as a more skilled and prolific player, making total number of 47 saves, more than any other goalkeeper in the tournament and kept 4 cleansheets.

==== East Bengal(loan) ====
On 19 December 2015, Rehenesh joined East Bengal FC on loan from NorthEast United FC for rest of the season. He made his debut in a 3–1 win over Sporting Goa in opening game of 2015-16 I-League on 11 January 2016. He made 10 appearances for The Torchbearers and kept 2 cleansheets.

==== 2016-17: Gametime Reduction ====
On 26 May 2016, Rehenesh signed another one-year contract extension with NorthEast. Due to the arrival of former India International Subrata Paul, Rehenesh was demoted to the role of second choice keeper. His first appearance of the season did not come before 26 November, when he came off the bench to replace an injured Paul in a 3–3 draw against Chennaiyin. Due to Paul's injury, he managed to get starts in last two games of the season as NorthEast once again failed to qualify for playoffs as they finished fifth in league stage.

==== East Bengal(loan) ====
On 28 October 2016, East Bengal had announced Rehenesh will join them for a second loan stint. He made his first appearance in opening game of 2016-17 I-League against Aizawl FC in a 1–1 draw. He was adjudged with man of the match award in Kolkata Derby against Mohun Bagan which ended in a 0–0 stalemate on 12 February 2017. He kept 5 cleansheets in 16 appearances.

==== 2017—19: Dip in form, Suspension and Departure ====
On 7 July 2017, he signed a 2-year extension with NorthEast United FC. He started the season with a cleansheet against newly formed Jamshedpur FC in a goalless draw on 18 November. On 15 December, he was sent off in a match against Kerala Blasters where he brought down Mark Sifneos in 42th minute in a 1–0 loss. He ended the season in a 2–0 loss to Gokulam Kerala in inaugural Super Cup. He managed to keep only 2 cleansheets in 18 games.

He started the 2018–19 Indian Super League in a 2–2 draw against FC Goa on 1 October. 3 days later, he kept his first cleansheet in a 1–0 victory over ATK. In the fifth minute of this game, Rehenesh punched ATK player Gerson Vieira during a corner but on-field referee and his assistants missed the incident but later it was spotted in the match footage and Rehenesh was suspended for next game against Chennaiyin. Later, he was suspended for next matches against Jamshedpur and Delhi Dynamos as well. He started in his 50th game for NorthEast against Bengaluru FC in a 2–1 loss on 30 January 2019. 8 days later, he started in his 50th ISL game against Delhi Dynamos which ended in a 1–1 draw but in the 84th minute of the game, while trying to punch away a cross from Romeo Fernandes he injured himself which ruled him out of the remaining season. He made only 6 appearances and kept 2 cleansheets in the season. After the expiration of his contract, he departed NorthEast United after spending 5 seasons at the club and making 51 appearances, which is still the most by any keeper at the club.

=== Kerala Blasters ===
On 24 July 2019, TP Rehenesh joined Kerala Blasters on a one-year deal. He made his debut on 2 November 2019 in a 2–1 loss to new entrants Hyderabad FC. 6 days later, he kept his first cleansheet in a goalless draw to another newbies Odisha FC. He had a disappointing season as he conceded 6 goals in a 6–3 loss to Chennaiyin on 1 February where he gave away the opening goal to Rafael Crivellaro and was very unsure with his decision-making throughout the match. After the game, a teary-eyed TP Rehenesh apologetically stood in front of the Kerala Blasters supporters who were present at the Jawaharlal Nehru Stadium after a heavy defeat.

=== Jamshedpur FC ===
On 8 September 2020, TP Rehenesh signed for Jamshedpur FC. He made his debut in a 2–1 loss to Chennaiyin on 24 November 2020. 5 days later, in a match against Odisha he was sent off in 74th minute for handling the ball outside his box which helped open the door for Odisha's comeback as the match drew 2–2 with late goals from Diego Mauricio. He made 54 saves and kept 9 cleansheets during the season and was one of the best players for the Men of Steel in the Indian Super League 2020–21.

On 9 August 2021, Rehenesh signed a contract extension with Jamshedpur till 2024.

=== Mumbai City FC ===
Following the expiry of his Jamshedpur FC contract, Rehenesh signed a 3-year contract with Mumbai City FC on 18 June 2024. He made his debut against Kerala Blasters FC on 3 November 2024, coming on as a 78th-minute substitute for Phurba Lachenpa, who had picked up an injury. Rehenesh made his full debut for Mumbai against Mohammedan SC, keeping a clean sheet in a routine 1–0 win for The Islanders.

Rehenesh played again in the club's following match, at home against Chennaiyin FC, making four saves and keeping a clean sheet in a 1–0 win for Mumbai. In the club's next match, at home against NorthEast United FC, despite Mumbai conceding in the first minute to Alaaeddine Ajaraie, Rehenesh saved a penalty from Ajaraie in the 25th minute. This was the fourth penalty that Rehenesh had saved in the ISL, and his first penalty save for Mumbai. However, Mumbai conceded twice in the last five minutes of the match to make the result a 3–0 loss for The Islanders.

== Career statistics ==
As of 31 December 2024

Club	Season	League			Domestic Cup		Continental		Total	
Club	Season	Division	Apps	Goals	Apps	Goals	Apps	Goals	Apps	Goals
Golden Threads	2010–11	I-League 2	?	0	—		—		0	0
Chirag United	2011–12	I-League	1	0	0	0	—		1	0
ONGC	2012–13	I-League	18	0	0	0	—		18	0
Mumbai Tigers	2013–14	Elite Division	17	0	3 (Note: Appearances in Durand Cup)	0	—		20	0
Rangdajied United (loan)	2013–14	I-League	7	0	0	0	—		7	0
Shillong Lajong	2014–15	I-League	15	0	0	0	—		15	0
NorthEast United (loan)	2014	Indian Super League	12	0	—		—		12	0
NorthEast United	2015	Indian Super League	12	0	—		—		12	0
NorthEast United	2016	Indian Super League	3	0	—		—		3	0
NorthEast United	2017–18	Indian Super League	17	0	1 (Note: Appearances in Super Cup)	0	—		18	0
NorthEast United	2018–19	Indian Super League	6	0	0	0	—		5	0
NorthEast United	Total		50	0	1	0	0	0	51	0
East Bengal (loan)	2015–16	I-League	8	0	2 (Note: Appearances in Federation Cup)	0	—		10	0
East Bengal (loan)	2016–17	I-League	15	0	1 (Note: Appearance in Federation Cup)	0	—		16	0
East Bengal (loan)	Total		23	0	3	0	0	0	26	0
Kerala Blasters	2019–20	Indian Super League	13	0	0	0	—		13	0
Jamshedpur	2020–21	Indian Super League	19	0	0	0	—		19	0
Jamshedpur	2021–22	Indian Super League	20	0	0	0	—		20	0
Jamshedpur	2022–23	Indian Super League	11	0	3	0	1 (Note: Appearance in Qualification for AFC Champions League group stage)	0	15	0
Jamshedpur	2023–24	Indian Super League	20	0	3	0	—		23	0
Jamshedpur	Total		70	0	6	0	0	0	76	0
Mumbai City	2024–25	Indian Super League	4	0	0	0	—		4	0
Career total			218	0	13	0	1	0	232	0

== Honours ==
Jamshedpur

- Indian Super League premiership: 2021–22

India U23

- South Asian Games silver medal: 2016
