= Khalid Jamil =

Indian footballer and manager

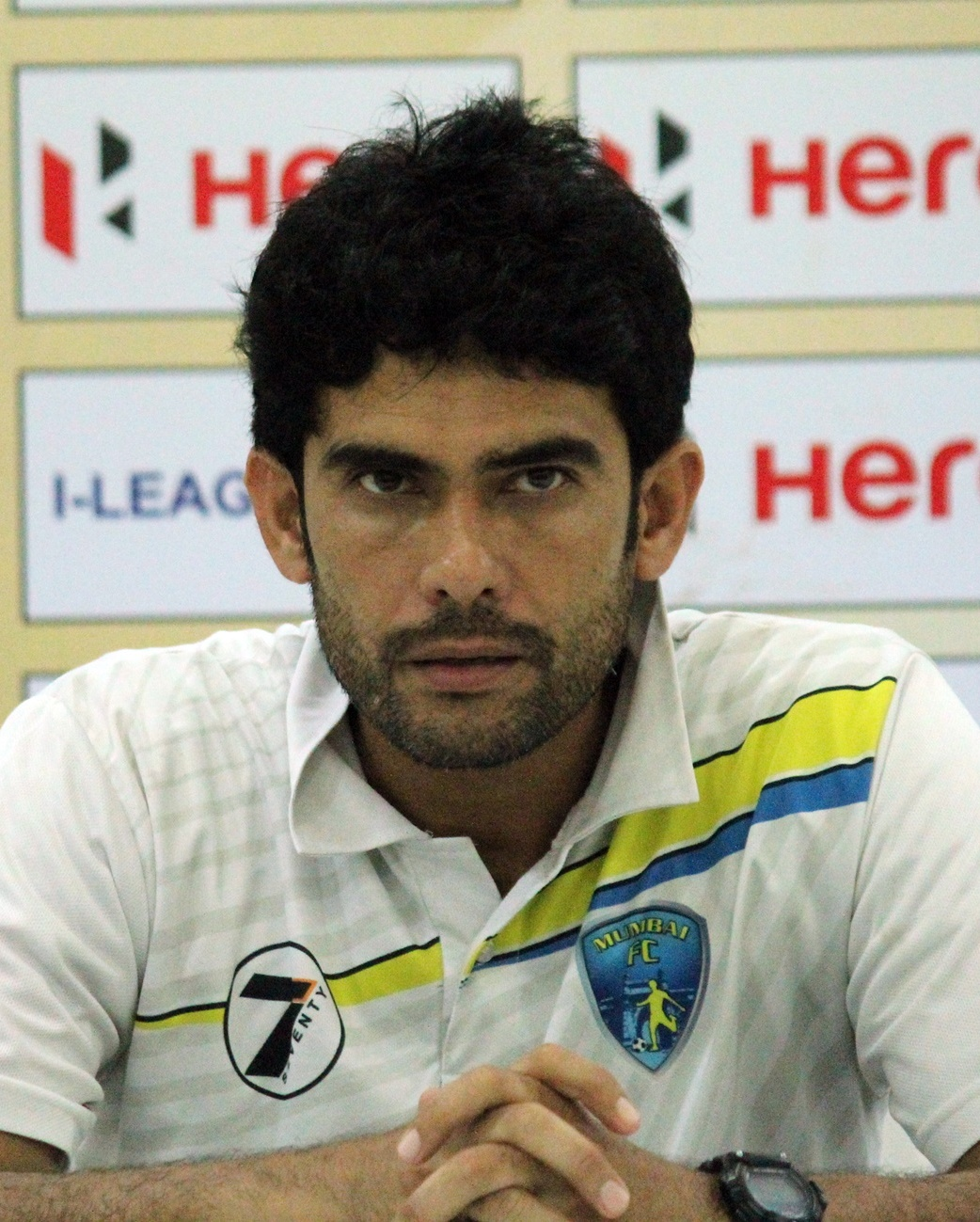
- Jamil with Mumbai in 2015

Personal information
- Full name: Khalid Ahmed Jamil
- Date of birth: 21 April 1977 (age 49)
- Place of birth: Kuwait City, Kuwait
- Height: 1.82 m (6 ft 0 in)
- Position: Midfielder

Team information
- Current team: India (head coach)

Senior career*
Years	Team	Apps	(Gls)
1997–1998	Mahindra United	38	(10)
1998–2001	Air India	78	(4)
2001–2007	Mahindra United	220	(25)
2007–2009	Mumbai	42	(6)
Total		378	(45)

International career
1998–2006	India	40	(4)

Managerial career
- 2009–2015: Mumbai
- 2016–2017: Aizawl
- 2017–2018: East Bengal
- 2018–2019: Mohun Bagan
- 2019–2020: NorthEast United (assistant)
- 2020–2021: NorthEast United (interim)
- 2021–2022: NorthEast United
- 2022–2023: Bengaluru United
- 2023: Chitwan
- 2023–2025: Jamshedpur
- 2025–: India
Medal record
Men's football
Representing India (as manager)
CAFA Nations Cup
Third place	2025 Tajikistan–Uzbekistan	Team
- * Club domestic league appearances and goals

Khalid Ahmed Jamil (born 21 April 1977) is a professional football manager and former player who is currently the head coach of the India national team. Born in Kuwait, he represented the Indian national team on 40 occasions and after taking an early retirement in 2009 due to injuries, he pursued a career in football management. Jamil spent most of his playing career at Mahindra United, Air India and Mumbai.

He started his managerial career with Mumbai and went on to manage several top-tier Indian football clubs like Mohun Bagan, East Bengal, Aizawl, Mumbai, NorthEast United and Jamshedpur, notably winning the I-League with Aizawl.

He is the first Indian coach to be appointed as a permanent head coach of an ISL club and the only Indian coach to qualify for the ISL playoffs, which he achieved with NorthEast United in the 2020–21 season.

In August 2025, he was appointed as the head coach of the India national team.

== Early career ==
Jamil was born on 21 April 1977 in Kuwait City, Kuwait to Indian parents. While in Kuwait, Jamil went to an under-14 camp and met Michel Platini who was then the France national football team's coach. Platini has been Jamil's favorite player ever since. He moved to India later and was offered a contract from East Bengal and Mohun Bagan but rejected them as the clubs were sponsored by an alcohol company.

== Club career ==
Jamil started his professional career with Mahindra United of the National Football League in 1997 but did not play during the 1997–98 season and left for Air India in 1998. During the 2000–01 season Jamil made his first professional appearances with Air India and reportedly got an offer to join a football club from Brunei but rejected the offer, which he still regrets. He then went back to Mahindra United in 2002 but barely played due to many injuries which eventually led to early retirement. He then joined Mumbai in 2007 but did not play a single game with them during his two years with the club. In 2009 Jamil announced his retirement.

== International career ==
Jamil made his international debut in a friendly match against Uzbekistan in 1998. He later appeared in 2002 World Cup Qualifiers, where they defeated teams like United Arab Emirates, Brunei and Yemen. India secured 11 points from 6 matches, same as Yemen, but finished behind them due to an inferior goal difference.

He represented the India national team in 40 matches, between 1998 and 2006.

== Managerial career ==
=== Mumbai ===
After retiring from playing, Jamil went straight into management and started with his last playing club Mumbai of the I-League in 2009. Mumbai managed to finish at 11th in the table, over relegation zone in the 2009–10 I-League, regarded as a great outcome considering the limited financial resources at his disposal. Jamil led Mumbai to 7th in 2010–11 I-League, and back-to-back 6th placed finishes in 2014-15 and 2015-16, keeping the club in the top-flight for straight seven seasons while lacking financial back-up.

=== Aizawl ===
On 1 January 2017, Jamil was appointed as the head coach of Aizawl. He led the club to 2016–17 I-League title while scripting history as the first club from Northeast India to win the Indian title.

=== East Bengal ===
After the title-winning season with Aizawl, Jamil joined East Bengal as the head coach on 1 July 2017 ahead of the 2017–18 I-League season won a record breaking ₹12.5 million deal, making him the then highest paid Indian coach in the history of India's top-tier leagues.

=== Mohun Bagan ===
On 7 January 2019, Jamil joined Mohun Bagan as the head coach, succeeding Sankarlal Chakraborty for the remainder of the season.

=== NorthEast United ===
On 19 June 2019, Jamil was appointed as head of the academy and assistant coach of the Indian Super League club NorthEast United on a three-year deal. Towards the end of 2019–20 Indian Super League season, NorthEast United dismissed head coach Robert Jarni and appointed Jamil as interim for remaining matches.

Jamil was handed over the interim role again in the 2020–21 season after head coach Gerard Nus parted ways with club mid-season NorthEast United went on a ten-game unbeaten run under him and advanced to 2021 Indian Super League playoffs, only for the second time in club's history, and Jamil became the first Indian coach to reach the ISL playoffs.

On 23 October 2021, Jamil was appointed as the head coach of NorthEast United, making him the first Indian permanent head coach of an ISL club. Under his guidance, NorthEast began its 2021–22 Indian Super League campaign on 20 November with a 4–2 loss to Bengaluru FC.

=== Bengaluru United ===
On 30 May 2022, Bengaluru United announced the appointment of Khalid Jamil as their head coach for the upcoming season. Later in 2023, the club participated in prestigious Stafford Challenge Cup, in which they clinched title defeating Chennaiyin FC Reserves in final. On 13 March, he was succeeded by Spanish coach Fernando Santiago Varela in the post.

=== Chitwan ===
On 29 September 2023, it was announced that Jamil has been roped in as new head coach by Nepal Super League club Chitwan.

=== Jamshedpur ===
On 31 December 2023, it was announced that Jamil had been appointed as the head coach of Jamshedpur for the remainder of the season after their previous coach, Scott Cooper, parted ways with the club.

Jamil's first match as Jamshedpur head coach came on January 10 in the 2024 Super Cup group stage, against former club NorthEast United. Jamshedpur won the match 2–1, thanks to a late goal from forward Steve Ambri. Following wins against Kerala Blasters and Shillong Lajong, Jamshedpur finished first in their group. However, they were then knocked out in the semi-final, following a 2–0 loss to East Bengal.

His first ISL match with Jamshedpur again came against NorthEast United, this time ending in a 1–1 draw. In their first half-season under Jamil, Jamshedpur finished in 11th.

=== India ===
On 1 August 2025, Jamil was announced as the head coach of the India national team. He became the first Indian to be appointed head coach of the national team in 13 years, succeeding Savio Medeira, whose tenure ended in 2012. On 13 August 2025, he signed a two-year contract, with an option to extend for another year.

On 25 August 2025, Jamil announced India's 23-man squad for their debut appearance in the CAFA Nations Cup. He led India to a 2–1 victory over Tajikistan in his debut game, marking the team's first win against Tajikistan in 17 years. In the third place match vs Oman, the score ended 1–1 with India winning on penalties 3–2. This marked India's first victory in 31 years, and winning India the third place medal.

== Managerial statistics ==
As of match played 15 November 2026

Managerial record by club and tenure
Team	From	To	Record					Ref.
Team	From	To	M	W	D	L	Win %	Ref.
Mumbai	1 July 2009	30 June 2016	164	44	58	62	26.83	
Aizawl	1 January 2017	30 June 2017	18	11	4	3	61.11	
East Bengal	1 July 2017	30 June 2018	22	11	7	4	50.00	
Mohun Bagan	8 January 2019	30 June 2019	9	4	2	3	44.44	
NorthEast United (interim)	10 February 2020	25 February 2020	3	0	1	2	0.00	
NorthEast United (interim)	12 January 2021	9 March 2021	11	6	4	1	54.55	
NorthEast United	23 October 2021	31 May 2022	20	3	5	12	15.00	
Bengaluru United	1 June 2022	30 June 2023	23	19	3	1	82.61	
Jamshedpur	31 December 2023	13 August 2025	48	24	6	18	50.00	
India	1 August 2025	Present	17	2	5	10	11.76	
Total			335	124	95	116	37.01	

== Honours ==
=== Player ===
Mahindra United

- National Football League: 2005–06
- Federation Cup: 2003, 2005
- Durand Cup: 2001
- IFA Shield: 2006

Maharashtra

- Santosh Trophy: 1999–2000

India

- SAFF Championship: 1997

=== Manager ===
Aizawl

- I-League: 2016–17

Jamshedpur

- Super Cup runner-up: 2025

India

- CAFA Cup third place: 2025

Individual

- AIFF Men's Coach of the Year: 2023–24, 2024–25
- I-League Syed Abdul Rahim Best Coach Award: 2016–17
- FPAI Indian Football awards: Coach of the Year (2020–21)

== See also ==
- List of India international footballers born outside India
