= Pratik Chaudhari =

Indian footballer (born 1989)

Personal information
- Full name: Pratik Prabhakar Chaudhari
- Date of birth: 4 October 1989 (age 37)
- Place of birth: Kolkata, India
- Height: 1.86 m (6 ft 1 in)
- Position: Centre-back

Team information
- Current team: Inter Kashi
- Number: 4

Youth career
- Bank of India
- Union Bank of India

Senior career*
| Years | Team | Apps | (Gls) |
| 2011–2013 | Air India | 23 | (0) |
| 2013–2014 | Rangdajied United | 7 | (0) |
| 2014–2015 | Mohun Bagan | 0 | (0) |
| 2016 | Mumbai | 13 | (0) |
| 2016 | Kerala Blasters | 8 | (0) |
| 2017 | Mumbai | 9 | (0) |
| 2017–2018 | Delhi Dynamos | 11 | (0) |
| 2018–2019 | Jamshedpur | 9 | (0) |
| 2019–2020 | Mumbai City | 17 | (1) |
| 2020–2022 | Bengaluru | 32 | (1) |
| 2022–2026 | Jamshedpur | 73 | (2) |
| 2026– | Inter Kashi | 2 | (0) |
- * Club domestic league appearances and goals as of 17 October 2026

Pratik Prabhakar Chaudhari (Bengali: প্রতীক চৌধুরী; born 4 October 1989) is an Indian professional footballer who plays as a defender for Indian Super League club Inter Kashi.

== Career ==
=== Early career ===
Born in Sabarkantha, Gujarat, Chaudhari began his football career while still a student and while working as a call-center employee. While working the night shift, Chaudhari would play football for Bank of India and Union Bank of India. He soon joined professional I-League side Air India in 2011.

In 2013, Chaudhari moved to another I-League side, Rangdajied United. He made his debut for the club on 22 September 2013 during their season opener against Prayag United. Chaudhari started and played 72 minutes as Rangdajied United lost 2–0. After the season ended, Chaudhari moved to Mohun Bagan, another I-League side.

=== Mumbai and Kerala Blasters ===
Prior to the 2015–16 season, Chaudhari returned to his birth city to play for I-League club Mumbai. During the season, he formed a formidable partnership with Son Min-chol.

After the season concluded, on 13 July 2016, Chaudhari signed with the Kerala Blasters of the Indian Super League. He made his debut for the club on 5 October 2016 against Atlético de Kolkata. He started and played the whole match as Kerala Blasters fell 1–0. Chaudhari then returned to Mumbai after the ISL season concluded on 24 December 2016.

=== Delhi Dynamos ===
On 23 July 2017, Chaudhari was selected in the 6th round of the 2017–18 ISL Players Draft by the Delhi Dynamos for the 2017–18 Indian Super League. He made his debut for the club during their opening match against Pune City on 22 November 2017. Partnering with Gabriel Cichero, the Dynamos managed to come out 3–2 winners.

=== Jamshedpur ===
After spending a season with Delhi Dynamos, Chaudhari signed for fellow ISL side Jamshedpur on 17 April 2018.

=== Mumbai City ===
On 22 August 2019 he joined Mumbai City FC. After one season he left the club on 2 June 2020.

=== Bengaluru FC ===
On 3 June 2020 he signed for ISL club Bengaluru FC.

== Honours ==
Mohun Bagan

- I-League: 2014–15
