= Elsinho (footballer, born 1991) =

Brazilian footballer

Personal information
- Full name: Elson José Dias Júnior
- Date of birth: 10 April 1991 (age 35)
- Place of birth: Uberaba, Brazil
- Height: 1.92 m (6 ft 4 in)
- Positions: Defensive midfielder; centre-back

Senior career*
Years	Team	Apps	(Gls)
2013	Votuporanguense	11	(1)
2014	Nacional	0	(0)
2015	Matonense	19	(0)
2015	Oeste	1	(0)
2016	Rio Claro	13	(0)
2016–2020	Juárez	113	(10)
2020	→ Celaya (loan)	8	(0)
2020–2021	Racing de Ferrol	24	(4)
2023	Portuguesa Santista	8	(0)
2023–2024	Jamshedpur	22	(0)
2024–2026	Chennaiyin	28	(1)
- * Club domestic league appearances and goals as of 11 April 2026

Elson José Dias Júnior (born 10 April 1991), known as Elsinho, is a Brazilian professional footballer who plays as a midfielder or defender.

On 29 July 2023, Jamshedpur announced the signing of Elsinho on a one-year deal.
