= List of Mumbai City FC seasons =

Mumbai City Football Club is an Indian professional football club based in Mumbai, Maharashtra that competes in the Indian Super League, the top flight of Indian football. The club was founded in August 2014, during the inaugural season of the Indian Super League (ISL).

Mumbai City is the first club to win both the ISL title and League Winners Shield, which it did in the 2020–21 season. Also, Mumbai City is the first club from India to win an AFC Champions League group stage match.

== Key ==
Key to league competitions:

- Indian Super League – Rebranded India's Top Tier Football League, Established In 2014

Key to colours and symbols:

1st or W	Winners
2nd or RU	Runners-up
3rd or 4th	Third or Fourth
⭐	Top scorer in division
♦	Top Indian scorer in division

Key to league record:

- Season = The year and article of the season
- Finals = Final position
- P = Games played
- W = Games won
- D = Games drawn
- L = Games lost
- GF = Goals for
- GA = Goals against
- Pts = Points

Key to cup record:

- En-dash (–) = The Islanders did not participate or cup not held
- GS =Group Stage
- R32 = Round of 32
- R16 = Round of 16
- QF = Quarter-finals
- SF = Semi-finals
- RU = Runners-up
- W = Winners

== Seasons ==
The Islanders started to play in the Indian Super League from its inception in 2014. They were one of the eight founding teams of the league. From 2017–18 season onwards, two more teams were added into the league. The Super Cup did not exist for the first three seasons until it was introduced in 2017. In 2020, one more club joined the league.

In August 2022, the Islanders announced their participation in Durand Cup, which is the oldest existing football tournament in Asia and 3rd oldest existing professional club football tournament in the world.

In the 2022–23 season, the club went on a record-breaking streak on their way to winning the ISL Shield, breaking the records for:

- Highest Points tally in the Indian Super League (47 Points)
- Quickest League Shield winners in Indian Super League history (18) Games
- Most no. of goals scored by a team in a single season (54) Goals
- Most no. of goals scored by Indian players in a single season (25) Goals
- Longest winning streak in an ISL season:11
- Longest unbeaten streak in an ISL season:18

Seasons of Mumbai City FC
Season	League								Finals	Super Cup	Durand Cup	Asian club competition		Top scorer(s)	
Season	Pld	W	D	L	GF	GA	Pts	Pos	Finals	Super Cup	Durand Cup	Asian club competition		Player(s)	Goals
2014	14	4	4	6	12	21	16	7th	DNQ	Did not exist ▼	DNP	No Qualification from ISL		(Brazil) André Moritz	3
2015	14	4	4	6	16	26	16	6th	DNQ	Did not exist ▼	—	No Qualification from ISL		(India) Sunil Chhetri	6♦
2016	14	6	5	3	16	8	23	1st	SF	Did not exist ▼	DNP	No Qualification from ISL		(Uruguay) Diego Forlán	5
2017–18	18	7	2	9	25	29	23	7th	DNQ	R16	—	DNQ		(Brazil) Éverton Santos	8
2018–19	18	9	3	6	25	20	30	3rd	SF	R16	—	DNQ		(Senegal) Modou Sougou	12
2019–20	18	7	5	6	25	29	26	5th	DNQ	Tournament Suspended ▼	DNP	DNQ		(Tunisia) Amine Chermiti	6
2020–21	20	12	4	4	35	18	40	1st	W	Tournament Suspended ▼	—	DNQ		(England) Adam Le Fondre	11
2021–22	20	9	4	7	36	31	31	5th	DNQ	Tournament Suspended ▼	DNP	AFC Champions League	2nd of 4 (Group Stage)	(Spain) Igor Angulo	10
2022–23	20	14	4	2	54	21	46	1st	SF	GS	RU	AFC Champions League	2nd of 4 (Group Stage)	(India) Lallianzuala Chhangte	18♦
2023–24	22	14	5	3	42	19	47	2nd	W	SF	QF	AFC Champions League	4th of 4 (Group Stage)	(Argentina) Jorge Pereyra Díaz	15
2024–25	24	9	9	6	29	28	36	6th	Knockout round	SF	GS	DNQ		(Greece) Nikos Karelis	10
2025–26	13	7	4	2	17	9	25	3rd	—	SF	DNP	DNQ		(India) Brandon Fernandes	4
2026–27	0	0	0	0	0	0	0	TBD	TBD	TBD	DNP	DNQ		TBD	TBD

As of 7th August 2026

== See also ==
- Mumbai City FC
- Mumbai City FC Reserves and Academy
- List of Mumbai City FC records and statistics
- List of Mumbai City FC players
