= 2014 Mumbai City FC season =

2014 football season for Mumbai City Football Club

Mumbai City FC
2014 season
- Head coach: Peter Reid
- Stadium: DY Patil Stadium
- ISL: 5th
- Top goalscorer: André Moritz (3)
- Highest home attendance: 28,000 (vs Pune City, 18 October 2014)
- Average home league attendance: 28,000
Home colours	Away colours	Third colours

The 2014 Season is Mumbai City FC's 1st season in existence in the Indian Super League.

== Background ==
In early 2014, it was announced that the All India Football Federation, the National Federation for Football in India, and IMG-Reliance would be accepting bids for ownership of eight of nine selected cities for the upcoming Indian Super League, an eight-team franchise league modeled along the lines of the Indian Premier League cricket tournament.

Mumbai were the visitors in the first ever ISL match on 12 October 2014, at Atlético de Kolkata's Salt Lake Stadium. With both Nicolas Anelka and Freddie Ljungberg absent, the side lost 3–0.

== Signings ==
=== Foreign signings ===
#	Position:	Player	Last club	Date	Source
4	MF	(Portugal) Tiago Ribeiro	(Switzerland) Grasshopper		
5	DF	(Germany) Manuel Friedrich	(Germany) Borussia Dortmund	22 August 2014	
8	MF	(Sweden) Freddie Ljungberg	Retirement	2 September 2014	
21	MF	(Brazil) André Moritz	(England) Bolton Wanderers	10 October 2014	
39	FW	(France) Nicolas Anelka	(England) West Bromwich Albion	15 September 2014	

=== Drafted domestic players ===
Round	Position	Player	Last Club
1	GK	(India) Subrata Pal	(Denmark) Vestsjælland
2	MF	(India) Lalrindika Ralte	East Bengal
3	DF	(India) Syed Rahim Nabi	Mohammedan
4	DF	(India) Raju Gaikwad	East Bengal
5	FW	(India) Subhash Singh	Shillong Lajong
6	MF	(India) Ram Malik	Mohun Bagan
7	DF	(India) Deepak Mondal	United Sports Club
8	MF	(India) Rohit Mirza	Mumbai
9	GK	(India) Ishan Debnath	United Sports Club
10	FW	(India) Nadong Bhutia	United Sikkim
11	MF	(India) Asif Kottayil	United Sports Club
12	DF	(India) Peter Costa	Mumbai
13	MF	(India) Lalrin Fela	Mohun Bagan
14	FW	(India) Sushil Kumar Singh	Eagles

=== Drafted foreign players ===
Round	Position	Player	Last Club
1	FW	(Argentina) Diego Nadaya	(Argentina) Almirante Brown
2	MF	(Czech Republic) Jan Štohanzl	(Czech Republic) Mladá Boleslav
3	MF	(Spain) Javi Fernandez	(Spain) Algeciras
4	DF	(Czech Republic) Pavel Čmovš	(Bulgaria) Levski Sofia
5	DF	(France) Johan Letzelter	(France) Chamois Niortais
6	GK	(Portugal) André Preto	(Portugal) Vitória de Guimarães
7	DF	(Greece) Ilias Pollalis	(Greece) Glyfada

== Players and staff ==
=== Squad ===
Note: Flags indicate national team as defined under FIFA eligibility rules; some limited exceptions apply. Players may hold more than one non-FIFA nationality.

No.	Pos.	Nation	Player
1	GK	IND	Subrata Paul
2	DF	FRA	Johan Letzelter
3	DF	IND	Raju Gaikwad
4	MF	POR	Tiago Ribeiro
5	DF	GER	Manuel Friedrich (vice captain)
6	MF	CZE	Jan Štohanzl
7	MF	IND	Rohit Mirza
8	MF	SWE	Freddie Ljungberg
9	FW	IND	Abhishek Yadav
10	FW	ARG	Diego Nadaya
11	MF	ESP	Javi Fernández
12	FW	IND	Singam Subash Singh
13	MF	IND	Ram Malik
14	FW	IND	Nadong Bhutia

No.	Pos.	Nation	Player
15	MF	IND	Asif Kottayil
16	DF	IND	Peter Costa
17	DF	IND	Deepak Mondal
18	FW	IND	Sushil Kumar Singh
19	DF	IND	Syed Rahim Nabi (captain)
20	MF	IND	Lalrindika Ralte
21	MF	BRA	André Moritz
23	FW	IND	Lalrin Fela
26	DF	GRE	Ilias Pollalis
27	DF	CZE	Pavel Čmovš
31	GK	IND	Ishan Debnath
39	FW	FRA	Nicolas Anelka
41	GK	POR	André Preto

Note:Numbers are referenced from those posted by the official ISL app.

=== Coaching staff ===
Position	Name
Head coach	(England) Peter Reid
Assistant coach	(England) Steve Darby

== Indian Super League ==
=== League table ===
Pos	Team	Pld	W	D	L	GF	GA	GD	Pts
5	Delhi Dynamos	14	4	6	4	16	14	+2	18
6	Pune City	14	4	4	6	12	17	−5	16
7	Mumbai City	14	4	4	6	12	21	−9	16
8	NorthEast United	14	3	6	5	11	13	−2	15

Source: Soccerway
Rules for classification: 1) points; 2) goal difference; 3) number of goals scored

=== Results summary ===
Overall								Home						Away					
Pld	W	D	L	GF	GA	GD	Pts	W	D	L	GF	GA	GD	W	D	L	GF	GA	GD
14	4	4	6	12	21	−9	16	4	1	2	9	6	+3	0	3	4	3	15	−12

Last updated: 1 September 2014.
Source: Matches

=== Results by round ===
Round	1	2	3	4	5	6	7	8	9	10	11	12	13	14
Ground	A	H	H	A	H	H	A	A	H	H	A	A	H	A
Result	L	W	L	L	W	W	D	D	D	L	L	L	W	D

Updated to match(es) played on 1 September 2014. Source: Matches
A = Away; H = Home; W = Win; D = Draw; L = Loss

=== Matches ===
12 October 2014 1	Atlético de Kolkata	3–0	Mumbai City	Kolkata
19:00 IST (UTC+5:30)	Teferra (yellow card) 25' (goal) 27'; Nato (yellow card) 32'; Borja 69'; Arnal 90+3' (yellow card) 90+3'	Report	Nabi (yellow card) 2'; Gaikwad (yellow card) 19'; Štohanzl (yellow card) 29'	Stadium: Salt Lake Stadium; Referee: Chris Penso

18 October 2014 2	Mumbai City	5–0	Pune City	Mumbai
19:00 IST (UTC+5:30)	Costa (yellow card) 3'; Moritz 12', 27', 71'; Singh 37'; Štohanzl (yellow card) 51'; Letzelter 85'	Report	Rodrigues (yellow card) 4'; Kotal (yellow card) 49'; Cirillo (yellow card) 70'; Rodríguez (yellow card) 85'	Stadium: DY Patil Stadium; Referee: Chris Penso

24 October 2014 3	Mumbai City	0–2	NorthEast United	Mumbai
19:00 IST (UTC+5:30)	Letzelter (yellow card) 45+2'; Čmovš (yellow card) 52' (yellow-red card) 75'	Report	Mtonga 57'; Batata 90+2'	Stadium: DY Patil Stadium; Referee: David Gantar

28 October 2014 4	Chennaiyin	5–1	Mumbai City	Chennai
19:00 IST (UTC+5:30)	Elano 9' (pen.), 69'; Lalpekhlua 26'; Mendoza 41', 44'; Khabra (yellow card) 55'; Djordjic (yellow card) 77'	Report	Letzelter (yellow card) 52'; Nabi 88'	Stadium: Jawaharlal Nehru Stadium; Referee: David Gantar

2 November 2014 5	Mumbai City	1–0	Kerala Blasters	Mumbai
19:00 IST (UTC+5:30)	Anelka 45'; Letzelter (yellow card) 83'	Report	Chettri (yellow card) 83'; Pearson (yellow card) 90+2'	Stadium: DY Patil Stadium; Referee: Jarred Gillett

5 November 2014 6	Mumbai City	1–0	Delhi Dynamos	Mumbai
19:00 IST (UTC+5:30)	Moritz (yellow card) 53'; Anelka 59'	Report	Bruno (yellow card) 55'	Stadium: DY Patil Stadium; Referee: Pranjal Banerji

9 November 2014 7	Goa	0–0	Mumbai City	Goa
16:30 IST (UTC+5:30)	N.Das (yellow card) 24'; Bengelloun (yellow card) 45+5'; Singh (yellow card) 66'	Report	Costa (yellow card) 27'; Štohanzl (yellow card) 74'	Stadium: Fatorda Stadium; Referee: Jarred Gillett

12 November 2014 8	Kerala Blasters	0–0	Mumbai City	Kochi
19:00 IST (UTC+5:30)		Report		Stadium: Jawaharlal Nehru Stadium; Referee: Pranjal Banerji

17 November 2014 9	Mumbai City	0–0	Goa	Mumbai
19:00 IST (UTC+5:30)	Čmovš (yellow card) 73'	Report	Desai (yellow card) 28'; Grégory (yellow card) 71'	Stadium: DY Patil Stadium; Referee: Muringothumalil Bhaskaran Santosh Kumar

23 November 2014 14	Mumbai City	0–3	Chennaiyin	Mumbai
19:00 IST (UTC+5:30)	Costa (yellow card) 80'; Letzelter (yellow card) 87'	Report	Djemba-Djemba (yellow card) 22'; Pelissari 71'; D.Singh 81'; Cristian 89'; Bracigliano (yellow card) 90+1'	Stadium: DY Patil Stadium; Referee: Anthony Simoes

28 November 2014 11	Delhi Dynamos	4–1	Mumbai City	Delhi
19:00 IST (UTC+5:30)	Houben (yellow card) 26'; Mulder 44'; Junker 50'; Marmentini 60'; Bhargav (yellow card) 89' (goal) 90+3'	Report	Štohanzl (yellow card) 62'; Yadav 86'	Stadium: Jawaharlal Nehru Stadium; Referee: Coimbatore Ramaswamy Srikrishna

3 December 2014 12	Pune City	2–0	Mumbai City	Pune
19:00 IST (UTC+5:30)	Cirillo (yellow card) 39'; Rodrigues (yellow card) 61'; Dudu 66', 80'	Report	Ribeiro (yellow card) 64'; Friedrich (yellow card) 64'	Stadium: Shree Shiv Chhatrapati Sports Complex; Referee: Baldomero Toledo

7 December 2014 13	Mumbai City	2–1	Atlético de Kolkata	Mumbai
19:00 IST (UTC+5:30)	Štohanzl (yellow card) 18'; Ralte (yellow card) 31' (goal) 40'; Yadav (yellow card) 35'; Friedrich 76'; Kottayil (yellow card) 90+8'	Report	Sahni 60'; Nato (yellow card) 86'	Stadium: DY Patil Stadium; Referee: Muringothumalil Bhaskaran Santosh Kumar

10 December 2014 10	NorthEast United	1–1	Mumbai City	Guwahati
19:00 IST (UTC+5:30)	Koke 34' (pen.)	Report	Ribeiro (yellow card) 8'; Čmovš (yellow card) 10'; Mondal (yellow card) 33'; Štohanzl (yellow card) 76'; Singh 84'	Stadium: Indira Gandhi Athletic Stadium; Referee: Ranjit Bakshi

== Squad statistics ==
As of Match played 10 December 2014

=== Appearances and goals ===
No.	Pos	Nat	Player	Total		Indian Super League	
No.	Pos	Nat	Player	Apps	Goals	Apps	Goals
1	GK	(India) IND	Subrata Pal	14	0	14	0
2	DF	(France) FRA	Johan Letzelter	13	1	13	1
3	DF	(India) IND	Raju Gaikwad	3	0	3	0
4	MF	(Portugal) POR	Tiago Ribeiro	11	0	9+2	0
5	DF	(Germany) GER	Manuel Friedrich	14	1	14	1
6	MF	(Czech Republic) CZE	Jan Štohanzl	13	0	13	0
7	MF	(India) IND	Rohit Mirza	1	0	0+1	0
8	MF	(Sweden) SWE	Freddie Ljungberg	4	0	1+3	0
9	FW	(India) IND	Abhishek Yadav	4	1	3+1	1
10	FW	(Argentina) ARG	Diego Nadaya	2	0	1+1	0
11	MF	(Spain) ESP	Javi Fernandez	4	0	0+4	0
12	FW	(India) IND	Subhash Singh	12	1	9+3	1
13	MF	(India) IND	Ram Malik	1	0	0+1	0
14	FW	(India) IND	Nadong Bhutia	11	0	3+8	0
15	MF	(India) IND	Asif Kottayil	3	0	1+2	0
16	DF	(India) IND	Peter Costa	10	0	8+2	0
17	DF	(India) IND	Deepak Mondal	12	0	11+1	0
18	FW	(India) IND	Sushil Kumar Singh	5	1	3+2	1
19	DF	(India) IND	Syed Rahim Nabi	8	1	8	1
20	MF	(India) IND	Lalrindika Ralte	14	1	12+2	1
21	MF	(Brazil) BRA	André Moritz	9	3	8+1	3
23	MF	(India) IND	Lalrin Fela	1	0	0+1	0
27	DF	(Czech Republic) CZE	Pavel Čmovš	13	0	13	0
39	FW	(France) FRA	Nicolas Anelka	7	2	7	2
41	GK	(Portugal) POR	André Preto	1	0	0+1	0

=== Goal scorers ===
Place	Position	Nation	Number	Name	Indian Super League	Total
1	MF	(Brazil)	21	André Moritz	3	3
2	FW	(France)	39	Nicolas Anelka	2	2
3	FW	(India)	12	Subhash Singh	1	1
3	DF	(France)	2	Johan Letzelter	1	1
3	DF	(India)	19	Syed Rahim Nabi	1	1
3	FW	(India)	9	Abhishek Yadav	1	1
3	MF	(India)	20	Lalrindika Ralte	1	1
3	DF	(Germany)	5	Manuel Friedrich	1	1
3	FW	(India)	18	Sushil Kumar Singh	1	1
				TOTALS	12	12

=== Disciplinary record ===
Number	Nation	Position	Name	Indian Super League		Total	
Number	Nation	Position	Name	Yellow card	Red card	Yellow card	Red card
2	(France)	DF	Johan Letzelter	4	0	4	0
3	(India)	DF	Raju Gaikwad	1	0	1	0
4	(Portugal)	MF	Tiago Ribeiro	2	0	2	0
5	(Germany)	DF	Manuel Friedrich	1	0	1	0
6	(Czech Republic)	MF	Jan Štohanzl	6	0	6	0
9	(India)	FW	Abhishek Yadav	1	0	1	0
15	(India)	MF	Asif Kottayil	1	0	1	0
16	(India)	DF	Peter Costa	3	0	3	0
17	(India)	DF	Deepak Mondal	1	0	1	0
19	(India)	DF	Syed Rahim Nabi	1	0	1	0
20	(India)	MF	Lalrindika Ralte	1	0	1	0
21	(Brazil)	MF	André Moritz	1	0	1	0
27	(Czech Republic)	DF	Pavel Čmovš	4	1	4	1
			TOTALS	27	1	27	1

== See also ==
- 2014 Indian Super League
