= List of Mumbai City FC players =

Mumbai City Football Club is an Indian professional football club based in Mumbai, Maharashtra that competes in Indian Super League, the top-tier league of Indian football. The club was founded on 30 August 2014 during the inaugural season of Indian Super League. Former England international Peter Reid managed the club during the first season with Freddie Ljungberg being the marquee player.

== List of players ==
As of 31 December 2020

The list includes all the players registered under a Mumbai City FC contract. Some players might not have featured in a professional game for the club.

Name	Nat	Pos^{[NB]}	Mumbai City FC career	Apps	Goals	Ref
André Preto	(Portugal)	Goalkeeper	2014	1	0	
Subrata Pal	(India)	Goalkeeper	2014–15	26	0	
Ishan Debnath	(India)	Goalkeeper	2014	0	0	
Manuel Friedrich	(Germany)	Defender	2014	14	1	
Pavel Čmovš	(Czech Republic)	Defender	2014–16	11	0	
Johan Letzelter	(France)	Defender	2014	13	1	
Ilias Pollalis	(Greece)	Defender	2014	0		
Peter Costa	(India)	Defender	2014	10	0	
Deepak Mondal	(India)	Defender	2014	12	0	
Syed Rahim Nabi	(India)	Defender	2014	8	1	
Raju Gaikwad	(India)	Defender	2014, 2017–18	18	0	
Tiago Ribeiro	(Portugal)	Midfielder	2014	11	0	
Freddie Ljungberg	(Sweden)	Midfielder	2014	4	0	
Nicolas Anelka	(France)	Midfielder	2014–15	13	2	
Javi Fernández	(Spain)	Midfielder	2014	4	0	
Jan Štohanzl	(Czech Republic)	Midfielder	2014	13	0	
Lalrin Fela	(India)	Midfielder	2014–16	1	0	
Asif Kottayil	(India)	Midfielder	2014	3	0	
Rohit Mirza	(India)	Midfielder	2014	0	0	
Ram Malik	(India)	Midfielder	2014	1	0	
Diego Nadaya	(Argentina)	Forward	2014	2	0	
Sushil Kumar Singh	(India)	Forward	2014	5	1	
Nadong Bhutia	(India)	Forward	2014	13	2	
Subhash Singh	(India)	Forward	2014–16	22	1	
Ashutosh Mehta	(India)	Defender	2015–17	16	0	
Brandon Fernandes	(India)	Midfielder	2015–17	2	0	
Pratesh Shirodkar	(India)	Midfielder	2015	7	0	
Keegan Pereira	(India)	Defender	2015–16	6	0	
Lalchhuanmawia	(India)	Defender	2015	9	0	
Debjit Majumder	(India)	Goalkeeper	2015	2	0	
Albino Gomes	(India)	Goalkeeper	2015–16	5	0	
Kingshuk Debnath	(India)	Defender	2015	3	0	
Rowilson Rodrigues	(India)	Defender	2015	4	0	
Gabriel Fernandes	(India)	Midfielder	2015	5	0	
Thangjam Singh	(India)	Midfielder	2015	1	0	
Sunil Chhetri	(India)	Forward	2015–16	11	7	
Frantz Bertin	(Haiti)	Defender	2015	11	1	
Frédéric Piquionne	(France)	Forward	2015	12	3	
Cristian Bustos	(Spain)	Defender	2015	12	0	
Selim Benachour	(Tunisia)	Midfielder	2015	11	1	
Juan Aguilera	(Tunisia)	Midfielder	2015	9	1	
Sony Norde	(Haiti)	Forward	2015–16	23	4	
Aitor	(Spain)	Defender	2015	4	0	
Darren O'Dea	(Republic of Ireland)	Defender	2015	9	0	
Matías Defederico	(Argentina)	Forward	2016–17	14	3	
Aiborlang Khongjee	(India)	Defender	2016–18	32	0	
Boithang Haokip	(India)	Defender	2016–17	3	0	
Jackichand Singh	(India)	Midfielder	2016	8	1	
Amrinder Singh	(India)	Goalkeeper	2016–	66	0	
Roberto Volpato	(Brazil)	Goalkeeper	2016	3	0	
Anwar Ali	(India)	Defender	2016, 2017–18	16	0	
Facundo Cardozo	(Argentina)	Defender	2016	6	0	
Gerson Vieira	(Brazil)	Midfielder	2016, 2017–18	31	2	
Sena Ralte	(India)	Defender	2016–17	16	0	
Lucian Goian	(Romania)	Defender	2016–19	50	2	
Lalchhuanmawia Fania	(India)	Defender	2016	1	0	
Facundo Cardozo	(Argentina)	Defender	2016	6	0	
Munmun Lugun	(India)	Defender	2016	0	0	
Krisztián Vadócz	(Hungary)	Midfielder	2016	16	3	
Léo Costa	(Brazil)	Midfielder	2016	11	2	
Pronay Halder	(India)	Midfielder	2016	5	0	
