= List of Mumbai City FC records and statistics =

Mumbai City Football Club is an Indian professional football club based in Mumbai, Maharashtra. The club was established on 30 August 2014 and began their first competitive season in the Indian Super League a few months later on 2014.

== Club ==
=== All-time performance record ===
As of 18th March 2025

Competition	MP	W	D	L	GF	GA	Win%
Indian Super League	214	101	52	61	333	267	47.20
Super Cup	10	6	0	4	13	12	60.00
Durand Cup	14	7	1	6	33	29	50.00
AFC Champions League	12	2	1	9	4	28	16.67
Total	250	116	54	80	383	336	46.40

=== Season by season record ===
Correct as of 18 March 2025, during the 2024–25 season.

Seasons of Mumbai City FC
Season	League								Finals	Super Cup	Durand Cup	Asian club competition		Top scorer(s)	
Season	Pld	W	D	L	GF	GA	Pts	Pos	Finals	Super Cup	Durand Cup	Asian club competition		Player(s)	Goals
2014	14	4	4	6	12	21	16	7th	DNQ	Did not exist ▼	DNP	No Qualification from ISL		(Brazil) André Moritz	3
2015	14	4	4	6	16	26	16	6th	DNQ	Did not exist ▼	—	No Qualification from ISL		(India) Sunil Chhetri	6♦
2016	14	6	5	3	16	8	23	1st	SF	Did not exist ▼	DNP	No Qualification from ISL		(Uruguay) Diego Forlán	5
2017–18	18	7	2	9	25	29	23	7th	DNQ	R16	—	DNQ		(Brazil) Éverton Santos	8
2018–19	18	9	3	6	25	20	30	3rd	SF	R16	—	DNQ		(Senegal) Modou Sougou	12
2019–20	18	7	5	6	25	29	26	5th	DNQ	Tournament Suspended ▼	DNP	DNQ		(Tunisia) Amine Chermiti	6
2020–21	20	12	4	4	35	18	40	1st	W	Tournament Suspended ▼	—	DNQ		(England) Adam Le Fondre	11
2021–22	20	9	4	7	36	31	31	5th	DNQ	Tournament Suspended ▼	DNP	AFC Champions League	2nd of 4 (Group Stage)	(Spain) Igor Angulo	10
2022–23	20	14	4	2	54	21	46	1st	SF	GS	RU	AFC Champions League	2nd of 4 (Group Stage)	(India) Lallianzuala Chhangte	18♦
2023–24	22	14	5	3	42	19	47	2nd	W	SF	QF	AFC Champions League	4th of 4 (Group Stage)	(Argentina) Jorge Pereyra Díaz	15
2024–25 (ongoing)	24	9	9	6	29	28	36	6th	TBD	TBD	GS	DNQ		(Greece) Nikos Karelis	10*

=== General ===
Note: When scores are mentioned, score Mumbai City FC are given first.

- First match: 0–3 (vs ATK, 12 October 2014)
- First win: 5–0 (vs Pune City, Indian Super League, 18 October 2014)
- Biggest win (in Indian Super League):
  - 6–1 (vs Kerala Blasters FC, 16 December 2018)
  - 6–1 (vs Odisha FC, 24 February 2021)
- Biggest loss (in Indian Super League):
  - 0–7 (vs FC Goa, 17 November 2015)
- Highest scoring draw:
  - 3–3 (vs FC Goa, 8 February 2021 )
  - 3–3 (vs Hyderabad FC, 9 October 2022)
- Biggest win (in Super Cup): 2–1 (vs Indian Arrows, 16 March 2018)
- Biggest loss (in Super Cup): 0–2 (vs Chennaiyin FC, 2019)
- Biggest win (in Durand Cup): 5-0 (vs Jamshedpur FC, 8 August 2023)
- Biggest loss (in Durand Cup): 0–8 (vs Kerala Blasters FC, 1 August 2024)
- Biggest win (in AFC Champions League):
  - 2–1 (vs Al-Quwa Al-Jawiya, 11 April 2022)
  - 1–0 (vs Al-Quwa Al-Jawiya, 26 April 2022)
- Biggest loss (in AFC Champions League): 0–6 (vs Al Shabab FC), 18 April 2022)
- Most wins in an ISL season:14 (out of 20 games), during the 2022–23 season
- Fewest wins in an ISL season:4 (out of 14 games), during the 2014 and 2015 season
- Most defeats in an ISL season:9 (out of 18 matches), during the 2017–18 season
- Fewest defeats in an ISL season:2 (out of 20 matches), during the 2022–23 season
- Most goals scored in an ISL season:54 goals in 20 games, during the 2022–23 season
- Fewest goals scored in an ISL season:14 goals in 14 games, during the 2014 season
- Most goals conceded in an ISL season:32 goals in 18 games, during the 2019–20 season
- Fewest goals conceded in an ISL season:11 goals in 14 games, during the 2014 season
- Highest goal difference in a single ISL season:+33 in 20 games, during the 2022–23 season
- Most points in an ISL season:46 in 20 games, during the 2022–23 season
- Fewest points in an ISL season:16 in 14 games, during the 2014 and 2015 seasons
- Highest attendance: 30,023 (vs Al Hilal SFC, 6 November 2023)
- Highest average home attendance in a season :22,712 (2015)

=== Team Records ===
- League winners (2016) (2020–21) (2022–23)
- Fewest goals conceded in a season: (11), Mumbai City (2016) (2020–21)
- Highest Points tally in the Indian Super League (47 Points) (2022–23)
- Quickest League Shield winners in Indian Super League history (18) Games (2022–23)
- Quickest semi-final qualification in Indian Super League history (15) Games (2020–21)
- Scored in (28) successive ISL games between 2021–22 and 2022–23 ISL seasons
- Most no. of goals scored by a team in a single season (54) Goals Mumbai City (2022–23)
- Most no. of goals scored by Indian players in a single season (25) Goals Mumbai City (2022–23)
- Most Number of Wins in Indian Super League (100 Wins) (as of 7 February 2025)
- First team to 100 Indian Super League wins
- Most consecutive away wins in a single Indian Super League season (8 Wins)
- Longest winning streak in an ISL season (11), during the 2022–23 season
- Longest unbeaten streak in an ISL season (18), during the 2022–23 season
- Record no. of Goalscorers from a single team Mumbai City (15) (2023–24)
- First team to score 5 goals in a single game v/s FC Pune City on 18 October 2014 at DY Patil Stadium
- Most Clean Sheets in Indian Super League by a Club (66) (as of 16 April 2024)
- Biggest Away Win in Indian Super League v/s Odisha FC (1–6 victory) on 24 February 2021
- Most passes by a Team in Indian Super League (807 Passes) v/s Odisha FC on 24 February 2021
- Most Passes completed by a Team in Indian Super League (714 Passes) v/s Odisha FC on 24 February 2021

== Players ==
As of 6 February 2025

=== Appearances ===
- Most appearances: Bipin Singh (151*)
- Most appearances as captain: Amrinder Singh (53)

=== Goals ===
- Youngest goalscorer: Nathan Rodrigues (19 Years 6 Months 17 Days) versus Indian Navy on 19 August 2023 (Durand Cup)
- Oldest goalscorer : Diego Forlán (37 years 06 months) v/s Kerala Blasters FC on 19 November 2016 (ISL)
- Most goals scored overall: Lallianzuala Chhangte (32*)
- Most goals scored in a season: 18, Lallianzuala Chhangte (2022–23)
- Most goals scored in single ISL season: Modou Sougou (12) in ISL 2018–29

=== Assists ===
- Most assists overall: Lallianzuala Chhangte (19*)
- Most assists in a single season: Greg Stewart (12) in 2022–23
- Most assists in a single ISL season: Hugo Boumous (9) in 2020–21

=== Clean Sheets ===
- Most clean sheets: Phurba Lachenpa (32*)
- Most clean sheets in a single season: Phurba Lachenpa (15) in 2023–24
- Most clean sheets in a single ISL season: Phurba Lachenpa (12) in ISL 2023–24

== Managerial ==
As of 6 February 2025

Name	Nationality	From	To	P	W	D	L	GF	GA	Win%
Peter Reid	England	4 September 2014	2014	14	4	4	6	12	21	28.57
Nicolas Anelka	France	3 July 2015	2015	14	4	4	6	16	26	28.57
Alexandre Guimarães	Costa Rica	19 April 2016	2018	34	13	8	13	43	37	38.24
Jorge Costa	Portugal	14 August 2018	2020	38	17	8	13	52	26	44.74
Sergio Lobera	Spain	12 October 2020	2021	23	14	5	4	39	21	60.87
Des Buckingham	England	8 October 2021	16 November 2023	72	39	12	21	144	104	54.17
Anthony Fernandes (interim)	India	28 November 2023	8 December 2023	3	1	0	2	5	4	33.33
Petr Kratky	Czech Republic	9 December 2023	Present	41	23	10	8	65	42	56.10

== See also ==
- Mumbai City FC
- Mumbai City FC Reserves and Academy
- List of Mumbai City FC players
- List of Mumbai City FC seasons
