= 2026–27 Mumbai City FC season =

Mumbai City FC
2026–27 season
- Director of Football: Sujay Sharma
- Head coach: Ashvir Singh Johal
- Stadium: Mumbai Football Arena
- Indian Super League: 11th
- Durand Cup: DNP
- Super Cup: TBD
- Top goalscorer: League: Sergio Llamas (1*); All: Sergio Llamas (1*)
- Biggest defeat: 2–0 vs Bengaluru, Indian Super League (21 November 2026)
Home colours	Away colours
- All statistics correct as of 10 October 2026.

The 2026–27 season is the thirteenth season in Mumbai City FC's existence, where the club will compete in the Indian Super League and Super Cup.

=== First-team squad ===
As of 12 November 2026

Note: Flags indicate national team as defined under FIFA eligibility rules; some limited exceptions apply. Players may hold more than one non-FIFA nationality.

No.	Pos.	Nation	Player
2	DF	IND	Dhruv Alva
3	DF	IND	Valpuia (4th captain)
4	DF	SRB	Lazar Ćirković
5	DF	ESP	Carlos Delgado (vice-captain)
6	FW	IND	Vikram Partap Singh
7	FW	IND	Farukh Choudhary
8	MF	ESP	Sergio Llamas
9	FW	COL	Wilmar Jordán Gil
10	MF	IND	Brandon Fernandes (3rd captain)
11	MF	BRA	Hadrian dos Santos
14	MF	IND	Lalnuntluanga Bawitlung
16	MF	IND	Franklin Nazareth
17	DF	IND	Bijay Chhetri
18	DF	IND	Amandeep
19	MF	IND	Hridaya Jain
20	FW	URU	Leandro Otormín

No.	Pos.	Nation	Player
21	MF	IND	Ishaan Shishodia
22	FW	IND	Muhammad Ajsal
23	GK	IND	Rehenesh TP
24	MF	IND	Supratim Das
27	DF	IND	Nathan Rodrigues
31	DF	IND	Akash Mishra (Captain)
32	GK	IND	Ahan Prakash
36	DF	IND	Sahil Panwar
39	MF	IND	Aadil Sheikh
45	MF	IND	Zothanpuia
49	FW	IND	Yuvraj Kadam
89	GK	IND	Ashish Sibi
92	FW	IND	Noufal PN
99	FW	SLO	Luka Majcen
—	DF	IND	Steiner D'Souza
—	GK	IND	Harsh Kadam

== Transfers ==
=== In ===
==== Transfers in ====
Date of arrival	Position	Player	Previous club	Transfer fee	Ref
1 August 2026	FW	(India) Muhammad Ajsal	(India) Kerala Blasters	Free Transfer	
2 August 2026	GK	(India) Ashish Sibi	(India) Dempo	Free Transfer	
22 August 2026	DF	(Spain) Carlos Delgado	(India) Odisha	Free Transfer	
23 August 2026	MF	(Spain) Sergio Llamas	(India) Inter Kashi	Free Transfer	
23 August 2026	FW	(Uruguay) Leandro Otormín	(Bolivia) Oriente Petrolero	Free Transfer	
25 August 2026	FW	(Colombia) Wilmar Jordán Gil	(Malaysia) Immigration F.C.	Free Transfer	
4 September 2026	MF	(India) Hridaya Jain	(Slovenia) NK Brinje Grosuplje	Free Transfer	
8 September 2026	DF	(Serbia) Lazar Ćirković	(India) Jamshedpur	Free Transfer	
1 October 2026	FW	(India) Farukh Choudhary	(India) Chennaiyin	Free Transfer	
11 November 2026	MF	(Brazil) Hadrian dos Santos	(Brazil) Barcelona-BA	Free Transfer	
12 November 2026	FW	(Slovenia) Luka Majcen	(India) Diamond Harbour	Free Transfer	

==== Loans in ====
Start Date	End Date	Position	Player	From club	Ref

=== Out ===
==== Transfers Out ====
Date of departure	Position	Player	Outgoing club	Transfer Fee	Ref
7 July 2026	GK	(India) Phurba Lachenpa	(India) East Bengal	Free Transfer	
10 July 2026	FW	(India) Lallianzuala Chhangte	(India) Mohun Bagan	Free Transfer	
15 July 2026	FW	(India) Ayush Chhikara	(India) Inter Kashi	Free Transfer	
15 July 2026	DF	(India) Sanjeev Stalin		Free Transfer	
15 July 2026	DF	(India) Halen Nongtdu		Free Transfer	
15 July 2026	FW	(India) Seilenthang Lotjem		Free Transfer	
15 July 2026	FW	(Portugal) Nuno Reis	(India) Chennaiyin	Free Transfer	
22 August 2026	MF	(Finland) Joni Kauko	(Finland) SalPa	Free Transfer	
22 August 2026	FW	(Spain) Jorge Ortiz	(India) Goa	Free Transfer	
22 August 2026	FW	(Argentina) Jorge Pereyra Díaz	(India) Samaleswari	Free Transfer	
1 October 2026	MF	(India) Gyamar Nikum	(India) Gokulam Kerala	Free Transfer	

==== Loans Out ====
Start Date	End Date	Position	Player	To club	Ref

== Personnel ==
=== Corporate ===
Position	Name
Owner(s)	(India) Ranbir Kapoor (50%) (India) Bimal Parekh (50%)
Board of directors	(India) Bimal Parekh (India) Sneha Parekh
CEO	(India) Kandarp Chandra
Head of corporate sales	(India) Jonathan Rego
Marketing manager	(India) Siddharth Yadav
Finance manager	(India) Megha Srivastava

=== Technical ===
Position	Name
Head coach	(England) Ashvir Singh Johal
Assistant coach	(India) Anthony Fernandes
Director of football	(India) Sujay Sharma
Team manager	(India) Rocky Kalan
Goalkeeping coach	(Serbia) Milos Petrovic
Strength & conditioning coach	(India) Jeriah Prasad
Performance analyst	(India) Narendra Vakare
Performance analyst	(India) Trishit Ghosh
Physiotherapist	(India) Suhas Kandekar
Physiotherapist	(India) Akhilesh
Team doctor	(India) Simarpreet Singh Kalra
Head of rehabilitation and sports medicine	(India) Sandeep Kurale
Media manager	(India) Swati Kalyadapu
Kit manager	(India) Rishi Roy
Head of youth and grassroots development	(India) Dinesh Nair

== Competitions ==
=== Indian Super League ===
Mumbai City's first game of the season was an away fixture against league debutants Churchill Brothers. However, the Islanders lost the fixture 2–1, with Gaurav Bora and Sebastian Gutierrez scoring for Churchill Brothers. Mumbai's only goal came through a last-minute penalty from Sergio Llamas.

After the first four games of the season, the club announced they had mutually parted ways with Márquez.
