= Jakub Vojtuš =

Slovak footballer (born 1993)

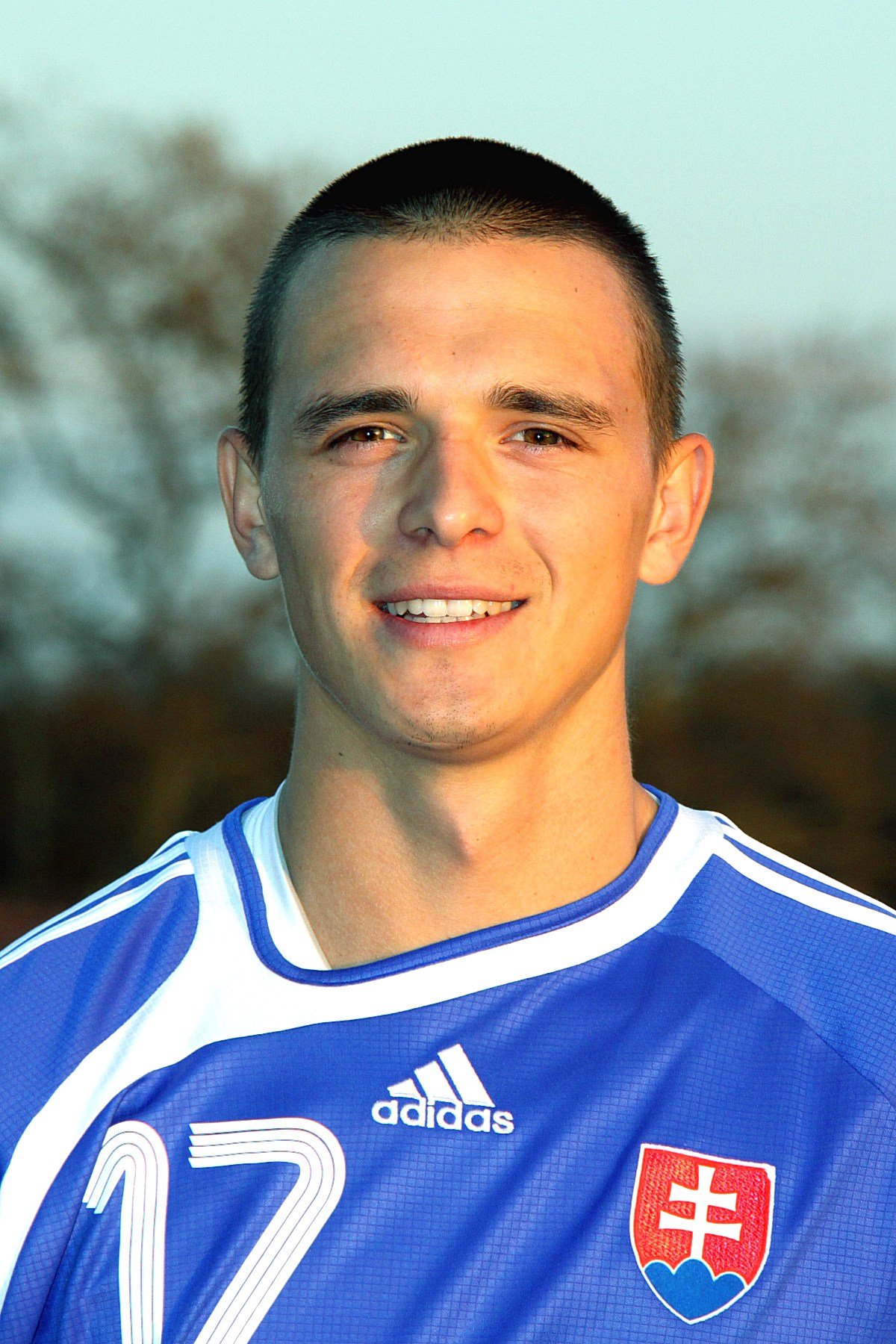
- Vojtuš with Slovakia U21 in 2012

Personal information
- Date of birth: 22 October 1993 (age 33)
- Place of birth: Spišská Nová Ves, Slovakia
- Height: 1.86 m (6 ft 1 in)
- Position: Striker

Team information
- Current team: Farul Constanța
- Number: 25

Youth career
- –2006: Spišská Nová Ves
- 2006–2010: Žilina
- 2010–2013: Inter Milan
- 2011: → Chievo Verona (loan)

Senior career*
Years	Team	Apps	(Gls)
2009–2010	Žilina	1	(0)
2012–2013	Inter Milan	0	(0)
2012–2013	→ NK Zagreb (loan)	15	(2)
2013–2014	Olhanense	15	(0)
2015	Spartak Trnava	28	(2)
2016	Universitatea Cluj	13	(5)
2016–2018	Miedź Legnica	31	(13)
2018	→ GKS Tychy (loan)	11	(2)
2018–2019	GKS Tychy	24	(6)
2019–2020	Academica Clinceni	33	(9)
2020–2021	CFR Cluj	7	(0)
2021–2022	Mezőkövesd	25	(2)
2022–2023	Rapid București	19	(4)
2023–2024	Politehnica Iași	21	(3)
2024	Mumbai City	6	(1)
2025	Unirea Slobozia	11	(2)
2025–	Farul Constanța	23	(1)

International career
2008	Slovakia U15	1	(0)
2009	Slovakia U17	3	(0)
2011–2012	Slovakia U19	4	(1)
2011–2014	Slovakia U21	6	(0)
- * Club domestic league appearances and goals as of 30 August 2026

Jakub Vojtuš (born 22 October 1993) is a Slovak professional footballer who plays as a striker for Liga I club Farul Constanța.

== Club career ==
Born in Spišská Nová Ves, Vojtuš began playing in the local club Spišská Nová Ves, until he was transferred to Žilina in 2006. He made his senior debut for them on 24 October 2009, in a league match against Senica.

Inter Milan signed Vojtuš in March 2010. He was sent on 1–year loan to NK Zagreb during 2012–13 season.

In August 2013, he was signed by Olhanense, managed by Abel Xavier, and played for 1 year in Portuguese Primeira Liga.

In January 2015, Spartak Trnava signed Vojtuš as a free agent. He made his league debut for them against Spartak Myjava on 28 February 2015.

In August 2020, CFR Cluj signed Vojtuš from Academica Clinceni, as a free agent. He played 7 times in the league for Cluj, as well as making 3 UEFA Europa League and 1 Hungarian Cup appearance, but failed to score. He subsequently transferred to Mezőkövesd of Hungary in January 2021. Vojtuš stayed with Mezőkövesd for a year, during which time he scored twice in 25 league matches. In January 2022 he returned to the Romanian league, signing a one-and-a-half-year contract to play for Rapid București.

On 18 March 2024, Indian Super League club Mumbai City announced they had agreed terms with Vojtuš, signing to be concluded post medicals. Vojtus played a crucial role in the ISL Cup Final: coming on as a substitute, Vojtus assisted Mumbai's second goal and scored their third goal, in an eventual 3–1 win over Mohun Bagan. Vojtus left the club in May 2024 following the expiry of his contract.

== Career statistics ==
As of match played 30 August 2026

Appearances and goals by club, season and competition
Club	Season	League			National cup (Note: Includes Croatian Cup, Taça de Portugal, Slovak Cup, Polish Cup, Cupa României, Magyar Kupa)		Europe		Other		Total	
Club	Season	Division	Apps	Goals	Apps	Goals	Apps	Goals	Apps	Goals	Apps	Goals
Žilina	2009–10	Slovak Superliga	1	0	–		–		–		1	0
NK Zagreb (loan)	2012–13	1. HNL	15	2	2	2	–		–		17	4
Olhanense	2013–14	Primeira Liga	15	2	1	0	–		1 (Note: Appearance in Taça da Liga)	0	1	0
Spartak Trnava	2015–16	Slovak First League	14	1	1	0	–		–		15	1
Spartak Trnava	2015–16	Slovak First League	14	1	2	0	3 (Note: Appearances in UEFA Europa League)	1	–		18	1
Spartak Trnava	Total		28	2	3	0	3	1	–		34	3
Universitatea Cluj	2015–16	Liga II	13	5	–		–		–		13	5
Miedź Legnica	2016–17	I liga	12	7	0	0	–		–		12	7
Miedź Legnica	2017–18	I liga	19	6	1	0	–		–		20	6
Miedź Legnica	Total		31	13	1	0	–		–		32	13
GKS Tychy (loan)	2017–18	I liga	11	2	–		–		–		11	2
GKS Tychy	2018–19	I liga	24	6	1	0	–		–		25	6
GKS Tychy	Total		35	8	1	0	–		–		36	8
Academica Clinceni	2019–20	Liga I	33	9	3	0	–		–		36	9
Academica Clinceni	2020–21	Liga I	0	0	–		–		–		0	0
Academica Clinceni	Total		33	9	3	0	–		–		36	9
CFR Cluj	2020–21	Liga I	7	0	1	0	3	0	–		11	0
Mezőkövesd	2020–21	Nemzeti Bajnokság I	15	1	3	0	–		–		18	1
Mezőkövesd	2021–22	Nemzeti Bajnokság I	10	1	1	0	–		–		11	1
Mezőkövesd	Total		25	2	4	0	–		–		29	2
Rapid București	2021–22	Liga I	14	4	–		–		–		11	0
Rapid București	2022–23	Liga I	5	0	3	1	–		–		8	1
Rapid București	Total		19	4	3	1	–		–		22	5
Politehnica Iași	2022–23	Liga II	10	2	–		–		–		10	2
Politehnica Iași	2023–24	Liga I	11	1	1	0	–		–		12	1
Politehnica Iași	Total		21	3	1	0	–		–		22	3
Mumbai City	2023–24	Indian Super League	6	1	–		–		–		6	1
Unirea Slobozia	2024–25	Liga I	11	2	–		–		2 (Note: Appearances in Liga I promotion/relegation play-offs)	1	13	3
Farul Constanța	2025–26	Liga I	21	1	2	0	–		1	0	24	1
Farul Constanța	2026–27	Liga I	2	0	1	0	–		–		3	0
Farul Constanța	Total		23	1	3	0	–		1	0	27	1
Career Total			283	54	23	3	6	1	4	1	316	59

== Honours ==
Politehnica Iași

- Liga II: 2022–23

Mumbai City

- ISL Cup: 2023–24
