= Madih Talal =

French footballer (born 1997)

Personal information
- Full name: Madih Talal
- Date of birth: 17 August 1997 (age 29)
- Place of birth: Paris, France
- Height: 1.78 m (5 ft 10 in)
- Position: Attacking midfielder

Team information
- Current team: Chennaiyin

Youth career
- 2014–2017: Angers

Senior career*
Years	Team	Apps	(Gls)
2014–2017	Angers B	23	(4)
2017–2020	Amiens B	16	(6)
2018–2020	Amiens	2	(0)
2018–2019	→ L'Entente SSG (loan)	24	(9)
2020–2021	Las Rozas	6	(1)
2021	Red Star	5	(0)
2021–2022	Avranches	31	(5)
2022–2023	A.E. Kifisia	23	(6)
2023–2024	Punjab	22	(6)
2024–2025	East Bengal	10	(1)
2025–2026	Jamshedpur	9	(2)
2026–	Chennaiyin	3	(0)
- * Club domestic league appearances and goals as of 26 October 2026

Madih Talal (born 17 August 1997) is a French professional footballer who plays as an attacking midfielder for Indian Super League club Chennaiyin.

== Career ==
Talal joined the academy of Angers SCO in 2014, after playing in various youth sides in Paris.

In June 2017, Talal joined Amiens SC from Angers, signing a three-year deal. He immediately joined Amiens reserve side, becoming an essential member of the side scoring 4 goals in 10 games. Talal made his professional debut with Amiens in a 6–0 Coupe de France loss to Sochaux on 7 January 2018.

In August 2018, Talal joined L'Entente SSG on loan for the 2018–19 season.

Released at the end of his Amiens SC contract, Talal signed for Spanish Segunda División B side Las Rozas CF in August 2020. After half a year in Spain he returned to France with Red Star in January 2021.

In July 2022, Talal joined A.E. Kifisia in Greece.

On 12 August 2023, Talal joined Indian Super League club Punjab FC. On 19 December, he scored his league goal for the club, helped the team winning their historic first match in the Super League, defeating Chennaiyin 1–0 at home.

Talal joined East Bengal for the 2024–25 season in the Indian Super League and played his first league match for the club against Bengaluru FC in September 2024.

== Personal life ==
Born in France, Talal is of Moroccan descent, and has citizenship of both countries.

== Career statistics ==
As of match played 10 April 2024

Appearances and goals by club, season and competition
Club	Season	League			Cup (Note: Includes Coupe de France, Coupe de la Ligue, Greek Football Cup, Copa Federación, Super Cup)		Continental		Total	
Club	Season	Division	Apps	Goals	Apps	Goals	Apps	Goals	Apps	Goals
Angers B	2014–15	CFA 2	7	0	—		—		7	0
Angers B	2015–16	CFA 2	2	1	—		—		2	1
Angers B	2016–17	CFA 2	14	3	—		—		14	3
Angers B	Total		23	4	0	0	—		23	4
Amiens B	2017–18	National 3	16	6	0	0	—		16	6
Amiens	2017–18	Ligue 1	0	0	1	0	—		1	0
Amiens	2019–20	Ligue 1	2	0	2	0	—		4	0
Amiens	Total		2	0	3	0	—		5	0
Entente SSG (loan)	2018–19	National	24	9	4	1	—		28	10
Las Rozas	2020–21	Segunda División B	6	1	2	0	—		8	1
Red Star	2020–21	National	5	0	2	0	—		7	0
Avranches	2021–22	National	31	5	0	0	—		31	5
A.E. Kifisia	2022–23	Super League Greece 2	23	6	4	0	—		27	6
Punjab	2023–24	Indian Super League	22	6	3	0	—		25	6
East Bengal	2024–25	Indian Super League	10	1	3	1	4	1	17	3
Career total			162	38	20	2	4	1	186	41

== Honours ==
Individual

- Indian Super League Player of the Month: February 2024
