= 2024 Indian Super League playoffs =

2023–24 ISL Cup playoffs
Tournament details
- Country: India
- Teams: 6

Final positions
- Champions: Mumbai City; 2nd title
- Runners-up: Mohun Bagan SG
- Semifinalists: Odisha; Goa

Tournament statistics
- Matches played: 7
- Goals scored: 22 (3.14 per match)

The 2024 Indian Super League Cup playoffs was the post-season knockout tournament of the 2023–24 Indian Super League to determine the ISL Cup winners. It was the 10th edition of the Indian Super League playoffs. The playoffs began on 29 March 2025 and concluded with the ISL Cup final on 12 April 2025.

The top two teams in regular season, Mumbai City and Mohun Bagan SG automatically qualified for the semi-finals. Teams finishing 3rd to 6th featured in a single-leg play-off to determine the other two semi-finalists, with Goa and Odisha advancing. The semi-finals was played over two legs whilst the final was a single-legged match which took place at the Vivekananda Yuba Bharati Krirangan Stadium in Kolkata, eventually won by Mumbai City against Mohun Bagan SG. Mumbai City became the first club to win the ISL Cup through winning all knockout matches.

== Season table ==
Pos	Team	Pld	W	D	L	GF	GA	GD	Pts	Qualification
1	Mohun Bagan (C)	22	15	3	4	47	26	+21	48	Qualification for the Champions League Two group stage and semi-finals
2	Mumbai City (W)	22	14	5	3	42	19	+23	47	Qualification for the semi-finals
3	Goa	22	13	6	3	39	21	+18	45	Qualification for the knockouts
4	Odisha	22	11	6	5	35	23	+12	39	Qualification for the knockouts
5	Kerala Blasters	22	10	3	9	32	31	+1	33	Qualification for the knockouts
6	Chennaiyin	22	8	3	11	26	36	−10	27	Qualification for the knockouts
7	NorthEast United	22	6	8	8	28	32	−4	26	
8	Punjab	22	6	6	10	28	35	−7	24 (Note: Head-to-head points: Punjab 4, East Bengal 1.)	
9	East Bengal	22	6	6	10	27	29	−2	24	Qualification for the Champions League Two preliminary stage (Note: East Bengal qualified for the AFC Champions League Two preliminary stage by winning the 2024 Super Cup.)
10	Bengaluru	22	5	7	10	20	34	−14	22	
11	Jamshedpur	22	5	6	11	27	32	−5	21	
12	Hyderabad	22	1	5	16	10	43	−33	8	

Source: Indian Super League
Rules for classification: 1) points; 2) head-to-head points; 3) head-to-head goal difference; 4) head-to-head goals scored; 5) goal difference; 6) number of goals scored; 7) fair play ranking
(C) Champions; (W) ISL Cup winners

== Teams ==
Automatically qualified for semi-finals

- Mohun Bagan SG
- Mumbai City

Qualified for the knockout play-offs

- Goa
- Odisha
- Kerala
- Chennaiyin

== Bracket ==
Knockout
4	Odisha (a.e.t.)	2
5	Kerala	1
3	Goa	2
6	Chennaiyin	1

Semifinals
1	Mohun Bagan SG	1	2	3
4	Odisha	2	0	2
2	Mumbai City	3	2	5
3	Goa	2	0	2

Finals
1	Mohun Bagan SG	1
2	Mumbai City	3

=== Knockout play-offs ===
Team 1	Score	Team 2
Odisha	2–1 (a.e.t.)	Kerala Blasters
Goa	2–1	Chennaiyin

=== Semi-finals ===
Team 1	Agg.	Team 2	1st leg	2nd leg
Mohun Bagan SG	3–2	Odisha	1–2	2–0
Mumbai City	5–2	Goa	3–2	2–0

== Knockout play-offs ==
19 April 2024
19:30 UTC+5:30/ IST

Odisha	2–1 (a.e.t.)	Kerala
Mauricio 87'; Isak 98'	ISL; AIFF; I-League	Černych 67'

Kalinga Stadium, Bhubaneswar
Attendance: 7,431
Referee: Harish Kundu

20 April 2024
19:30 UTC+5:30/ IST

Goa	2–1	Chennaiyin
Sadaoui 36'; Fernandes 45'	ISL; AIFF; I-League	Ćirković 45+4'

Pandit Jawaharlal Nehru Stadium, Margao
Attendance: 12,469
Referee: Crystal John

== Semi-finals ==
=== Semi-finals 1st legs ===
23 April 2024
19:30 UTC+5:30/IST

Odisha	2–1	Mohun Bagan SG
Carlos 11'; Krishna 39'	ISL; AIFF; I-League	Manvir 3'

Kalinga Stadium, Bhubaneswar
Attendance: 9,417
Referee: Tejas Visvasrao Nagvenkar
24 April 2024
19:30 UTC+5:30/IST

Goa	2–3	Mumbai City
Thangjam 16'; Fernandes 56'	ISL; AIFF; I-League	Chhangte 90', 90+6'; Vikram 90+1'

Pandit Jawaharlal Nehru Stadium, Margao
Attendance: 17,216
Referee: Pratik Mondal

=== Semi-finals 2nd legs ===
28 April 2024
19:30 UTC+5:30/ IST

Mohun Bagan SG	2–0	Odisha
Cummings 22'; Samad 90+3'	ISL; AIFF; I-League

Vivekananda Yuba Bharati Krirangan, Kolkata
Attendance: 62,007
Referee: Crystal John

Mohun Bagan SG won 3-2 on aggregate.

29 April 2024
19:30 UTC+5:30/ IST

Mumbai City	2–0	Goa
Pereyra 69'; Chhangte 83'	ISL; AIFF; I-League

Mumbai Football Arena, Mumbai
Attendance: 6,953
Referee: Harish Kundu

Mumbai City won 5-2 on aggregate.

== Final ==
Final Match
Team 1	Score	Team 2
Mohun Bagan SG	1–3	Mumbai City

4 May 2024
19:30 IST

Mohun Bagan SG	1–3	Mumbai City
Cummings 44'	Report	Pereyra Díaz 53'; Bipin 81'; Vojtuš 90+7'

Vivekananda Yuba Bharati Krirangan, Kolkata
Attendance: 62,007
Referee: Venkatesh R
