= Indian Super League playoffs =

Annual postseason elimination tournament of the Indian Super League

- Founded: 2014
- Region: India
- Teams: 6
- Current champions: Mohun Bagan (2nd title)
- Most championships: ATK (3 titles)
- 2027 ISL Cup playoffs

The ISL Cup playoffs is the annual postseason elimination tournament of the Indian Super League (ISL). Unde the current format adopted for the 2022–23 season, six teams qualify based on their regular-season standings. The top two teams advance directly to the semi-finals, while the remaining four compete in single-leg eliminators. The winner of the final is awarded the ISL Cup. Until the 2021–22 Indian Super League season, the ISL Cup winners were awarded the ISL championship title.

From the 2022–23 Indian Super League season onward, the regular-season League Shield Winners are awarded the championship title in the Indian Super League.

== History ==
Seasons	League teams	Playoff teams	% of teams	Matches played
2014	8	4	50%	5
2015	8	4	50%	5
2016	8	4	50%	5
2017–2018	10	4	40%	5
2018–2019	10	4	40%	5
2019–2020	10	4	40%	5
2020–2021	11	4	36.3%	5
2021–2022	11	4	36.3%	5
2022–2023	11	6	54.5%	7
2023–2024	12	6	50%	7
2024–2025	13	6	46.1%	7

== Playoffs system ==
The top two clubs after the regular season automatically progress to the ISL playoffs. The playoffs culminate with the ISL Final, where the winner is presented with the ISL Cup. In the qualifiers, the third-through-sixth ranked teams play a single-elimination match hosted at the higher-ranked team's venue, with the two winners joining the first and second-ranked teams in two-legged semifinals played over two weeks (since 2022–23). The two winners eventually met in the final hosted at a pre-decided venue, but from 2023–24 onwards, the final is played at the higher-ranked team's venue.

== Qualification ==
After the regular season, the team with the most points is declared the Champions and presented with the League Winners Shield, automatically qualifying for the playoffs along with the runners-up. At the same time, the next best four teams qualify to qualifying playoffs. The position of each team is determined by the highest number of points accumulated during the regular season. If two or more teams are level on points, the following criteria are applied in order until one of the teams can be determined as the higher ranked:

1. Highest number of points accumulated in matches between the teams concerned;
2. Highest goal difference in matches between the teams concerned;
3. Highest number of goals scored in matches between the teams concerned;
4. Highest goal difference
5. Highest number of goals scored
6. Lowest number of red cards accumulated;
7. Lowest number of yellow cards accumulated;
8. Toss of a coin.

== List of finals ==
Season	Venue	Cup Winners (Number of titles)	Score	Runners–up
2014	Navi Mumbai, Maharashtra	Atlético de Kolkata	1–0	Kerala Blasters
2015	Margao, Goa	Chennaiyin	3–2	Goa
2016	Kochi, Kerala	Atlético de Kolkata (2)	1–1 (a.e.t) (4–3 p)	Kerala Blasters
2017–18	Bangalore, Karnataka	Chennaiyin (2)	3–2	Bengaluru
2018–19	Mumbai, Maharashtra	Bengaluru	1–0	Goa
2019–20	Margao, Goa	ATK (3)	3–1	Chennaiyin
2020–21	Margao, Goa	Mumbai City	2–1	Mohun Bagan
2021–22	Margao, Goa	Hyderabad	1–1 (a.e.t) (3–1 p)	Kerala Blasters
2022–23	Margao, Goa	Mohun Bagan	2–2 (a.e.t) (4–3 p)	Bengaluru
2023–24	Kolkata, West Bengal	Mumbai City (2)	3–1	Mohun Bagan
2024–25	Kolkata, West Bengal	Mohun Bagan (2)	2–1 (a.e.t)	Bengaluru
2025–26	Not held			
2026–27				

== Appearances by club ==
Bold indicates they won the ISL Cup that year. Team names in italics indicates the club is defunct or a former Indian Super League member.

Rank	Club	App	Year
1	Goa	8	2014, 2015, 2018, 2019, 2020, 2021, 2024, 2025
2	Chennaiyin	5	2014, **2015**, **2018**, 2020, 2024
2	Kerala Blasters	5	2014, 2016, 2022, 2023, 2024
2	Mumbai City	5	2016, 2019, **2021**, 2023, **2024**, 2025
5	ATK	4	**2014**, 2015, **2016**, **2020**
5	Mohun Bagan	4	2021, 2022, **2023**, 2024, **2025**
5	Odisha (Note: The team played as Delhi Dynamos till 2018–19 season, after which the club was relocated from Delhi to Odisha and rebranded as Odisha FC)	4	2015, 2016, 2023, 2024
5	Bengaluru	4	2018, **2019**, 2020, 2023, 2025
9	Hyderabad	2	**2022**, 2023
9	NorthEast United	2	2019, 2021, 2025
11	Jamshedpur	1	2022, 2025
11	Pune City	1	2018

== See also ==
- AFC Champions League Two
