= Hridaya Jain =

Indian footballer (born 2005)

Personal information
- Date of birth: 19 December 2005 (age 20)
- Place of birth: Karnataka, India
- Positions: Midfielder; forward

Team information
- Current team: Mumbai City
- Number: 19

Senior career*
Years	Team	Apps	(Gls)
2023–2024	Techtro Swades United FC	5	(0)
2024	→ FC Bengaluru United (loan)	2	(0)
2024–2025	Delhi FC	21	(4)
2025–2026	NK Brinje Grosuplje	1	(0)
2026–	Mumbai City	0	(0)
- * Club domestic league appearances and goals as of 10:45, 4 September 2026 (UTC)

Hridaya Jain (born 19 December 2005) is an Indian professional footballer who plays as a midfielder or forward for Indian Super League club Mumbai City.

== Early life ==
Jain was born on 19 December 2005. Born in Bangalore, Karnataka, India. To a Sindhi mother and Marwari father.

== Career ==
Jain started his career with Indian side Techtro Swades United FC. Subsequently, he was sent on loan to Indian side FC Bengaluru United.

Ahead of the 2024–25 season, he signed for I-League side Delhi FC. In his sole season at the club, he made twenty-one league appearances and scored four goals, winning the I-League Emerging Player award.

Following his stint there, he signed for Slovenian side NK Brinje Grosuplje during the summer of 2025.

== Style of play ==
Jain plays as a midfielder or forward. Indian news website Khel Now wrote in 2025 that he "is a versatile talent who can play anywhere in the attack... impressed... with his ability to take on defenders, create chances, deceive compact defenses, and convert some of those chances with finesse".
