= Gerard Zaragoza =

Spanish football player/manager

Personal information
- Full name: Gerard Zaragoza Mulet
- Date of birth: 20 February 1982 (age 44)
- Place of birth: Sant Jaume, Spain

Youth career
- Years: Team
- Gimnàstic

Managerial career
- 2012–2013: Locomotive Tbilisi
- 2013–2014: Torpedo Kutaisi
- 2014–2015: Amposta
- 2015–2016: Locomotive Tbilisi
- 2028–2021: Shabab Al-Ahli
- 2021–2022: Panserraikos
- 2022–2023: Khor Fakkan
- 2023–2025: Bengaluru
- 2025–2026: Panserraikos

Gerard Zaragoza Mulet (born 20 February 1982) is a Spanish professional football manager.

== Career ==
Born in Sant Jaume d'Enveja, Tarragona, Catalonia, Zaragoza played youth football for Dertusa, Cambrils and Gimnàstic de Tarragona as a youth, but retired due to an injury. He started his career at the Escola de Veterans de Cambrils, and subsequently went on to work with the Catalonia national team, taking over the under-14 and under-16s while also working as a scout for the Qatari branch of the Aspire Academy.

In 2010, Zaragoza moved to the Senegal branch of the Aspire, being manager of the under-16s. In 2011, he returned to his home country, being named in charge of Espanyol's Cadete squad.

Zaragoza moved abroad in September 2012, initially in the backroom staff of Georgian Erovnuli Liga 2 side Locomotive Tbilisi. He subsequently took over as manager in November, and led the club to the second position of the East group, achieving promotion to the top tier. In May 2013, he took over Torpedo Kutaisi of the Erovnuli Liga, leaving the club the following January.

On 20 March 2014, Zaragoza returned to his home country and was appointed manager of Amposta in the Primera Catalana. In July, he was named Michael Laudrup's assistant at Lekhwiya, but returned to Locomotive in October 2015.

Zaragoza left the Georgian side in October 2016, and immediately rejoined Laudrup's staff at Al-Rayyan. In 2018–19, he acted as Carles Cuadrat's assistant coach at Indian Super League side Bengalaru, ending the season as champions.

In November 2019, Zaragoza returned to the United Arab Emirates after being appointed as manager of Shabab Al-Ahli's under-21s. The following 8 March, he was named first team manager until the end of the campaign, after the sacking of Rodolfo Arruabarrena.

Zaragoza made his debut as manager of Shabab Al-Ahli on 13 March 2020, in a 5–2 away defeat of Ajman Club. At the end of the year, Zaragoza left the club after a poor start of the season, despite only losing once.

On 14 December 2023, it was officially announced by the Indian Super League club Bengaluru that they had appointed Zaragoza as their new head coach. On 14 November 2025, the club announced his departure under mutual terms.

== Managerial statistics ==
As of match played 21 May 2026

Managerial record by team and tenure
Team	From	To	Record							
Team	From	To	M	W	D	L	GF	GA	GD	Win %
(Georgia (country)) Locomotive Tbilisi	29 November 2012	26 May 2013	15	11	3	1	36	12	+24	73.33
(Georgia (country)) Torpedo Kutaisi	1 June 2013	1 January 2014	22	6	7	9	27	34	−7	27.27
(Georgia (country)) Locomotive Tbilisi	16 October 2015	24 October 2016	33	8	10	15	30	46	−16	24.24
(United Arab Emirates) Shabab Al Ahli	8 March 2020	15 December 2020	16	7	8	1	31	15	+16	43.75
(Greece) Panserraikos	1 July 2021	2 January 2022	8	3	3	2	12	12	+0	37.50
(United Arab Emirates) Khor Fakkan	29 September 2023	28 October 2023	3	1	1	1	8	8	+0	33.33
(India) Bengalaru	14 December 2023	14 November 2025	46	20	8	18	75	64	+11	43.48
(Greece) Panserraikos	16 November 2025	5 June 2026	26	6	6	14	18	48	−30	23.08
Total			128	43	40	45	162	179	−17	33.59
