= Javi Fernández (footballer, born 1988) =

Spanish footballer

Personal information
- Full name: Francisco Javier Fernández Luque
- Date of birth: 22 February 1988 (age 38)
- Place of birth: Torre del Mar, Spain
- Height: 1.71 m (5 ft 7 in)
- Position: Winger

Team information
- Current team: Vélez

Youth career
- Málaga

Senior career*
Years	Team	Apps	(Gls)
2006–2007	Málaga B	8	(1)
2007–2008	Vélez	38	(10)
2008–2009	Almería B	33	(5)
2009–2010	Vélez	19	(7)
2010–2012	Toledo	62	(11)
2012–2013	Ronda	13	(1)
2013–2014	Algeciras	41	(2)
2014	Mumbai City	4	(0)
2015	Europa	2	(0)
2016–2017	Vélez	12	(0)
2017	San Roque	18	(2)
2017	St Joseph's	6	(0)
2018–2020	Vélez	36	(5)
2020–2021	Rincón		
2022–2024	Torre del Mar	76	(8)
- * Club domestic league appearances and goals as of 26 May 2024

Francisco Javier 'Javi' Fernández Luque (born 22 February 1988) is a Spanish footballer who plays as a left winger.

== Football career ==
Born in Torre del Mar, Province of Málaga, Andalusia, Fernández was a Málaga CF youth graduate. He made his senior debut for the reserves on 3 December 2006 by starting in a 0–2 Segunda División B away loss against AD Ceuta, and scored his first goal the following 25 February in a 2–1 win at CF Villanovense.

Fernández left the club in the summer of 2007, and subsequently resumed his career in the third level but also in Tercera División, representing Vélez CF (two stints), UD Almería B, CD Toledo, CD Ronda and Algeciras CF. He experienced two promotions and three relegations with Toledo and Algeciras, notably netting ten times for the former team in the 2010–11 campaign.

In August 2014, Fernández was included in the inaugural draft of the newly-formed Indian Super League. Picked up by Mumbai City FC, he made his professional debut on 9 November by replacing Tiago Ribeiro in a 0–0 away draw against FC Goa.

Fernández left India at the end of the season, and joined Gibraltarian side Europa F.C. on 18 July 2015. He played twice in the league and featured in their UEFA Europa League run, before being sidelined due to a testicular cancer.

Back to full fitness in July 2016, Fernández returned to Vélez before moving to fellow fourth tier club CD San Roque the following January. In July 2017 he signed for St Joseph's F.C. also from the Gibraltar top flight, and made his full debut with the Saints on 14 October by coming on as an 87th-minute substitute in a 1–0 defeat of Glacis United FC.

On 1 December 2017, Fernández rejoined Vélez for a fourth spell.
