= Ishaan Shishodia =

Indian footballer (born 2005)

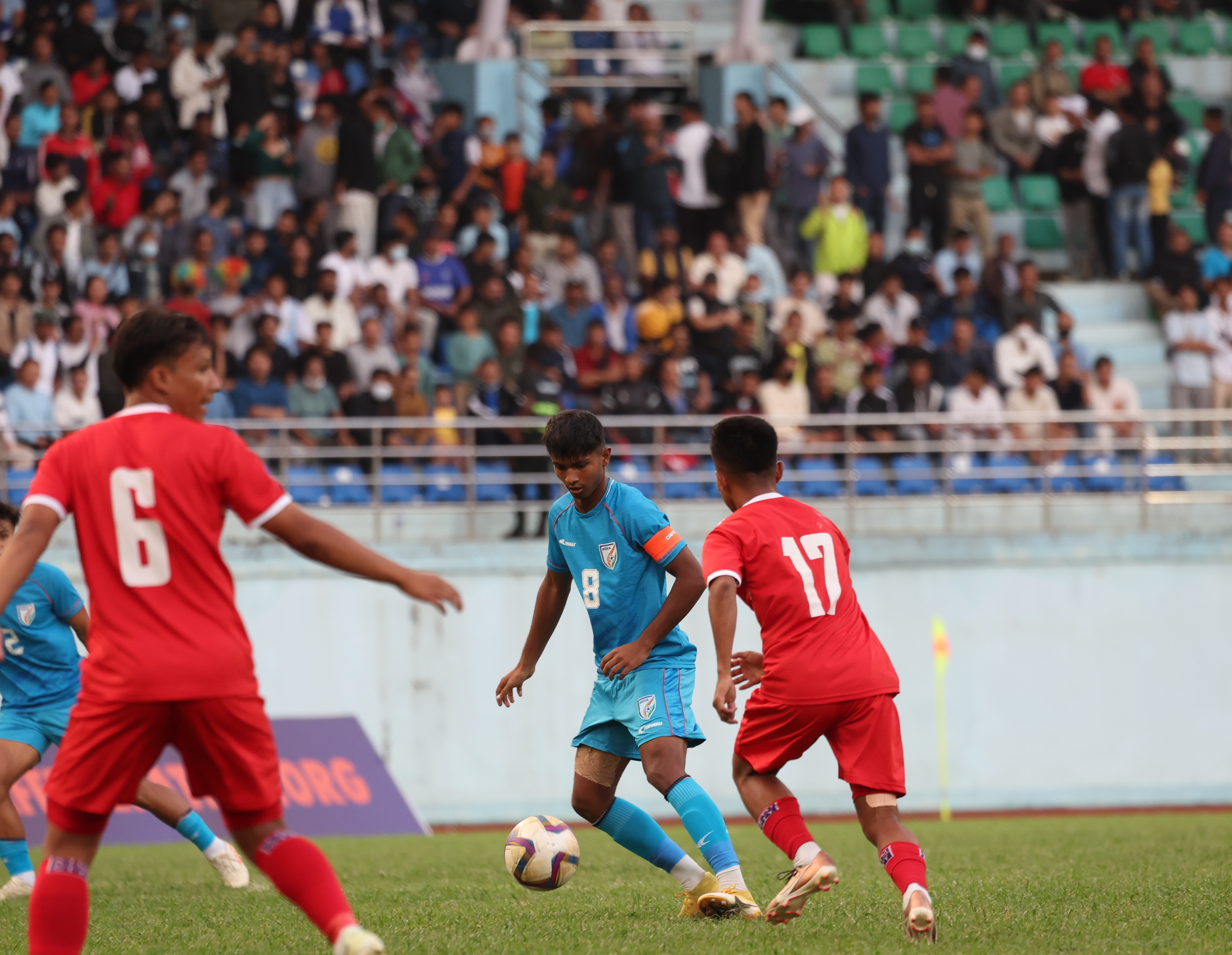
- Shishodia with India U19 at the 2023 SAFF U19 Championship

Personal information
- Full name: Ishaan Shishodia
- Date of birth: 31 August 2005 (age 21)
- Place of birth: Ghaziabad, India
- Position: Midfielder

Team information
- Current team: Mumbai City
- Number: 21

Youth career
- 2015–2024: Odisha
- 2024–: Mumbai City

Senior career*
Years	Team	Apps	(Gls)
2024–	Mumbai City	0	(0)

International career^{‡}
2023–	India U19	3	(0)
- * Club domestic league appearances and goals as of 11:24, 27 January, 2025 (UTC) ‡ National team caps and goals as of 11:24, 13 January, 2024 (UTC)

Ishaan Shishodia (born 31 August 2005) is an Indian professional footballer who plays as a midfielder for Indian Super League club Mumbai City and the India under-19 national team.

== Club career ==
=== Mumbai City ===
On 13 January 2024, Ishaan signed for retaining ISL shield winners Mumbai City FC on a three-and-a-half-year deal, until the end of the 2026–27 season.

== International career ==
=== India under-19 ===
Ishaan Shishodia made his national debut for the Indian U19 football team on 21 September 2023. This debut occurred during a match against the Bangladesh U19 football team in the SAFF U-19 Cup. SAFF (South Asian Football Federation) Cup is a prestigious regional tournament in South Asia that provides a platform for emerging talent to showcase their skills on the international stage. He also was the member of India U-15 team back in 2019. India emerged victorious in the SAFF U19 Championship, with Ishaan serving as the team's captain at the time.

== Career statistics ==
As of 30 September 2023

National team	Season	League			SAFF U19		Durand Cup		AFC		Total	
National team	Season	Tournament	Apps	Goals	Apps	Goals	Apps	Goals	Apps	Goals	Apps	Goals
India national under-20 football team	2022–213	SAFF U19	—	—	3	0	0	0	—	—	3	0
Career total			0	0	3	0	0	0	0	0	3	0

== Honours ==
India U19

- SAFF U-20 Championship: 2023
