= 2023–24 Indian Super League =

10th season of the Indian Super League

Indian Super League
- ISL 10th anniversary logo
- Season: 2023–24
- Dates: League: 21 September 2023 – 15 April 2024; Playoffs: 19 April 2024 - 4 May 2024
- Champions: Mohun Bagan; 1st ISL Shield title 6th Indian title
- ISL Cup Winners: Mumbai City; 2nd ISL Cup title
- AFC Champions League Two: Mohun Bagan (Indian Super League winners); East Bengal (Super Cup winners)
- Matches: 139
- Goals: 384 (2.76 per match)
- Top goalscorer: Dimitrios Diamantakos; Roy Krishna (13 goals)
- Best goalkeeper: Phurba Lachenpa; Amrinder Singh; Vishal Kaith (9 clean sheets)
- Biggest home win: East Bengal 5–0 NorthEast United (4 December 2023)
- Biggest away win: Hyderabad 0–5 Jamshedpur (21 December 2023)
- Highest scoring: Kerala Blasters 3–4 Mohun Bagan (13 March 2024)
- Longest winning run: 5 matches Mohun Bagan; Mumbai City; Goa
- Longest unbeaten run: 13 matches Odisha
- Longest winless run: 18 matches Hyderabad
- Longest losing run: 8 matches Hyderabad
- Highest attendance: 62,007; Mohun Bagan 2–0 Odisha (28 April 2024); Mohun Bagan 1–3 Mumbai City (4 May 2024)
- Total attendance: 1,686,631
- Average attendance: 12,311 (excluding matches played behind closed doors)

The 2023–24 Indian Super League was the 10th season of the Indian Super League (ISL) and the 28th season of the top-tier Indian football. It commenced on 21 September 2023 and concluded with the ISL Cup final on 4 May 2024.

Mumbai City were the defending champions whilst Mohun Bagan were the defending cup winners.

Mohun Bagan became champions by winning their first ISL shield and sixth Indian title overall by topping the league table with a record 48 points. Mumbai City won their second ISL Cup, defeating Mohun Bagan 3–1 in the final. Also Mumbai City became the first club to win to ISL Cup through winning all knockout matches.

== Changes from last season ==
- This was the first season where the promoted I-League winner competed, thereby increasing the number of participating teams to 12. Punjab FC was promoted to the Indian Super League by winning the 2022–23 I-League.
- The league lasted for around eight months–the longest in its history, primarily due to the breaks taken during the 2023 AFC Asian Cup and 2026 World Cup qualification matches.
- As per the new AFC Club Competitions Ranking structure, ISL clubs will not be eligible for a slot in the AFC Champions League; instead, the league champions will qualify for the AFC Cup group stage, rebranded as AFC Champions League Two.
- From this season onwards, defending League Shield winners wear the champions badge instead of the defending cup winners.
- From this season onwards, no star is used in the tournament logo of the club jersey based on the number of ISL title of that club.

== Teams ==
Twelve teams competed in the league: eleven from the previous season and one promoted from the 2022–23 I-League.

Promoted from 2022–23 I-League

- Punjab ▲

== Stadiums and locations ==
Locations of the Indian Super League teams

Team	State	City	Stadium	Capacity
Bengaluru	Karnataka	Bengaluru	Sree Kanteerava Stadium	25,810
Chennaiyin	Tamil Nadu	Chennai	Jawaharlal Nehru Stadium Chennai	40,000
East Bengal	West Bengal	Kolkata	Vivekananda Yuba Bharati Krirangan	68,000
Goa	Goa	Margao	Fatorda Stadium	19,000
Hyderabad	Telangana	Hyderabad	GMC Balayogi Athletic Stadium	30,000
Jamshedpur	Jharkhand	Jamshedpur	JRD Tata Sports Complex	24,424
Kerala Blasters	Kerala	Kochi	Jawaharlal Nehru Stadium Kochi	41,000
Mohun Bagan	West Bengal	Kolkata	Vivekananda Yuba Bharati Krirangan	68,000
Mumbai City	Maharashtra	Mumbai	Mumbai Football Arena	6,600
NorthEast United	Assam	Guwahati	Indira Gandhi Athletic Stadium	24,627
Odisha	Odisha	Bhubaneswar	Kalinga Stadium	12,000
Punjab (Note: The club is based in Mohali, Punjab, but played its home games in New Delhi.)	Punjab	Mohali	Jawaharlal Nehru Stadium Delhi	60,000

=== Personnel and kits ===
Team	Head coach	Captain (s)	Kit manufacturer	Shirt main sponsor
Bengaluru	(Spain) Gerard Zaragoza	(India) Sunil Chhetri	Puma	JSW
Chennaiyin	(Scotland) Owen Coyle	(England) Ryan Edwards	Nivia	Melbat
East Bengal	(Spain) Carles Cuadrat	(Brazil) Cleiton Silva	Trak-Only	Batery AI
Goa	(Spain) Manolo Márquez	(India) Brandon Fernandes	SIX5SIX	Parimatch News
Hyderabad	(India) Thangboi Singto	(Brazil) João Victor	Hummel	Stake News
Jamshedpur	(India) Khalid Jamil	(Nigeria) Daniel Chima Chukwu	Nivia	Tata Steel
Kerala Blasters	(Serbia) Ivan Vukomanović	(Uruguay) Adrián Luna	SIX5SIX	BYJU'S
Mohun Bagan	(Spain) Antonio López Habas	(India) Subhasish Bose	Nivia	1XBAT
Mumbai City	(Czech Republic) Petr Kratky	(India) Rahul Bheke	Puma	Stake News
NorthEast United	(Spain) Juan Pedro Benali	(France) Romain Philippoteaux	Trak-Only	Meghalaya Tourism
Odisha	(Spain) Sergio Lobera	(India) Amrinder Singh	Trak-Only	Odisha Tourism
Punjab	(Greece) Staikos Vergetis	(Slovenia) Luka Majcen	T10 Sports	Roundglass

=== Managerial changes ===
Team	Outgoing manager	Manner of departure	Date of vacancy	Ref.	Position in the table	Incoming manager	Date of appointment	Ref.
East Bengal	(England) Stephen Constantine	Sacked	17 April 2023		Pre-season	(Spain) Carles Cuadrat	25 April 2023	
NorthEast United	(India) Floyd Pinto	End of interim spell	22 April 2023		Pre-season	(Spain) Juan Pedro Benali	22 May 2023	
Goa	(Spain) Carlos Peña	Sacked	23 April 2023		Pre-season	(Spain) Manolo Márquez	3 June 2023	
Odisha	(India) Clifford Miranda	End of interim spell	25 April 2023		Pre-season	(Spain) Sergio Lobera	17 May 2023	
Hyderabad	(Spain) Manolo Márquez	End of contract	31 May 2023		Pre-season	(India) Thangboi Singto	7 July 2023	
Jamshedpur	(England) Aidy Boothroyd	End of contract	31 May 2023		Pre-season	(England) Scott Cooper	14 July 2023	
Chennaiyin	(Germany) Thomas Brdarić	Mutual consent	10 June 2023		Pre-season	(Scotland) Owen Coyle	16 July 2023	
Mumbai City	(England) Des Buckingham	Signed by Oxford United	16 November 2023		4th	(Czech Republic) Petr Kratky	9 December 2023	
Bengaluru	(England) Simon Grayson	Mutual consent	9 December 2023		9th	(Spain) Gerard Zaragoza	14 December 2023	
Jamshedpur	(England) Scott Cooper	Mutual consent	29 December 2023		10th	(India) Khalid Jamil	31 December 2023	
Mohun Bagan	(Spain) Juan Ferrando	Sacked	3 January 2024		5th	(Spain) Antonio López Habas	3 January 2024	

== Foreign players ==
The AIFF allows clubs to register a maximum of six foreign players, including one AFC quota player. A maximum of four can be fielded in a match at a time.

Bold suggests the player was signed during the mid-season winter transfer window.

Team	Player 1	Player 2	Player 3	Player 4	Player 5	AFC player	Unregistered player(s)	Former player(s)
Bengaluru	(Australia) Ryan Williams	(Denmark) Oliver Drost	(Montenegro) Slavko Damjanović	(Netherlands) Keziah Veendorp	(Spain) Javi Hernández	(Australia) Aleksandar Jovanovic		(England) Curtis Main
Chennaiyin	(Brazil) Rafael Crivellaro	(England) Ryan Edwards	(Italy) Cristian Battocchio	(Scotland) Connor Shields	(Serbia) Lazar Ćirković	(Australia) Jordan Murray		
East Bengal	(Brazil) Cleiton Silva	(Costa Rica) Felicio Brown Forbes	(Serbia) Aleksandar Pantić	(Spain) Saúl Crespo	(Spain) Víctor Vázquez	(Jordan) Hijazi Maher	(Australia) Jordan Elsey	(Spain) Borja Herrera (Spain) José Antonio Pardo (Spain) Javier Siverio
Goa	(Republic of Ireland) Carl McHugh	(Morocco) Noah Sadaoui	(Spain) Borja Herrera	(Spain) Carlos Martínez	(Spain) Odei Onaindia	(Australia) Paulo Retre	(Spain) Víctor Rodríguez	
Hyderabad	(Brazil) João Victor							(Australia) Joe Knowles (Brazil) Felipe Amorim (Costa Rica) Jonathan Moya (Finland) Petteri Pennanen (Mexico) Oswaldo Alanís
Jamshedpur	(Brazil) Elsinho	(France) Jérémy Manzorro	(Nigeria) Daniel Chima Chukwu	(Serbia) Alen Stevanović	(Spain) Javier Siverio	(Japan) Rei Tachikawa		(Croatia) Petar Slišković (Guinea-Bissau) Steve Ambri
Kerala Blasters	(Croatia) Marko Lešković	(Greece) Dimitrios Diamantakos	(Lithuania) Fedor Černych	(Montenegro) Miloš Drinčić	(Uruguay) Adrián Luna	(Japan) Daisuke Sakai	(Australia) Jaushua Sotirio (Ghana) Kwame Peprah (Nigeria) Justine Emmanuel	
Mohun Bagan	(Albania) Armando Sadiku	(Australia) Brendan Hamill	(Australia) Dimitri Petratos	(Finland) Joni Kauko	(Spain) Héctor Yuste	(Australia) Jason Cummings	(France) Hugo Boumous	
Mumbai City	(Argentina) Jorge Pereyra Díaz	(Netherlands) Yoëll van Nieff	(Slovakia) Jakub Vojtuš	(Spain) Alberto Noguera	(Spain) Tiri	(Syria) Thaer Krouma	(Spain) Iker Guarrotxena	(Australia) Rostyn Griffiths (Netherlands) Abdenasser El Khayati (Scotland) Greg Stewart
NorthEast United	(France) Romain Philippoteaux	(Morocco) Hamza Regragui	(Morocco) Mohammed Ali Bemammer	(Spain) Míchel Zabaco	(Spain) Néstor Albiach	(Australia) Tomi Juric		(Brazil) Ibson Melo (Palestine) Yaser Hamed
Odisha	(Brazil) Diego Maurício	(Fiji) Roy Krishna	(Morocco) Ahmed Jahouh	(Senegal) Mourtada Fall	(Spain) Carlos Delgado	(Japan) Cy Goddard		
Punjab	(Colombia) Wilmar Jordán	(France) Madih Talal	(Greece) Dimitrios Chatziisaias	(Slovenia) Luka Majcen	(Spain) Juan Mera	(Nepal) Kiran Chemjong		

== League table ==
Pos	Team	Pld	W	D	L	GF	GA	GD	Pts	Qualification
1	Mohun Bagan (C)	22	15	3	4	47	26	+21	48	Qualification for the Champions League Two group stage and semi-finals
2	Mumbai City (W)	22	14	5	3	42	19	+23	47	Qualification for the semi-finals
3	Goa	22	13	6	3	39	21	+18	45	Qualification for the knockouts
4	Odisha	22	11	6	5	35	23	+12	39	Qualification for the knockouts
5	Kerala Blasters	22	10	3	9	32	31	+1	33	Qualification for the knockouts
6	Chennaiyin	22	8	3	11	26	36	−10	27	Qualification for the knockouts
7	NorthEast United	22	6	8	8	28	32	−4	26	
8	Punjab	22	6	6	10	28	35	−7	24 (Note: Head-to-head points: Punjab 4, East Bengal 1.)	
9	East Bengal	22	6	6	10	27	29	−2	24	Qualification for the Champions League Two preliminary stage (Note: East Bengal qualified for the AFC Champions League Two preliminary stage by winning the 2024 Super Cup.)
10	Bengaluru	22	5	7	10	20	34	−14	22	
11	Jamshedpur	22	5	6	11	27	32	−5	21	
12	Hyderabad	22	1	5	16	10	43	−33	8	

Source: Indian Super League
Rules for classification: 1) points; 2) head-to-head points; 3) head-to-head goal difference; 4) head-to-head goals scored; 5) goal difference; 6) number of goals scored; 7) fair play ranking
(C) Champions; (W) ISL Cup winners

== Results ==
Home \ Away	BEN	CHE	EAB	GOA	HYD	JAM	KER	MBG	MCI	NEU	OFC	PFC
Bengaluru	—	1–0	2–1	0–0	2–1	1–0	1–0	0–4	0–4	1–1	0–0	3–3
Chennaiyin	2–0	—	1–1	0–3	0–1	2–1	1–0	1–3	0–2	2–1	2–1	5–1
East Bengal	2–1	1–0	—	1–2	2–1	0–0	1–2	1–3	0–1	5–0	0–0	0–0
Goa	2–1	4–1	1–0	—	4–0	1–0	1–0	0–1	0–0	0–2	3–2	1–0
Hyderabad	1–1	0–1	0–1	0–2	—	0–5	1–3	0–2	0–3	2–2	0–3	0–2
Jamshedpur	1–1	2–2	2–1	2–3	1–0	—	1–1	2–3	0–3 (Note: Jamshedpur was handed a 3–0 defeat against Mumbai City in their match on March 8, which ended 1–1, due to fielding an ineligible player.)	1–1	0–1	0–0
Kerala Blasters	2–1	3–3	2–4	4–2	1–0	1–0	—	3–4	2–0	1–1	2–1	1–3
Mohun Bagan SG	1–0	2–3	2–2	1–4	2–0	3–0	0–1	—	2–1	4–2	2–2	3–1
Mumbai City	2–0	3–0	0–0	1–1	1–1	2–3	2–1	2–1	—	4–1	2–1	2–1
NorthEast United	1–1	3–0	3–2	1–1	1–1	2–1	2–0	1–3	1–2	—	3–0	0–1
Odisha	3–2	2–0	2–1	1–1	3–0	4–1	2–1	0–0	2–2	1–0	—	3–1
Punjab	3–1	1–0	4–1	3–3	1–1	0–4	0–1	0–1	2–3	1–1	0–1	—

Source: Indian Super League
Legend: Blue = home team win; Yellow = draw; Red = away team win.

=== Form ===
Team ╲ Round	1	2	3	4	5	6	7	8	9	10	11	12	13	14	15	16	17	18	19	20	21	22
Bengaluru	L	L	W	D	L	D	D	D	L	L	W	D	L	W	D	L	W	W	L	D	L	L
Chennaiyin	L	L	L	W	W	L	D	D	D	W	L	L	L	W	L	L	W	L	W	W	W	L
East Bengal	D	W	L	L	L	D	W	D	D	D	D	L	L	W	L	W	L	L	L	W	W	L
Goa	W	W	W	D	W	W	W	D	W	D	W	D	L	L	L	D	W	D	W	W	W	W
Hyderabad	L	L	L	D	D	D	L	L	D	L	L	L	L	L	L	L	L	D	W	L	L	L
Jamshedpur	D	L	W	D	L	L	L	L	D	L	W	L	D	W	D	W	W	L	L	D	L	L
Kerala Blasters	W	W	L	D	W	W	W	D	L	W	W	W	L	L	L	W	L	L	D	L	L	W
Mohun Bagan SG	W	W	W	W	W	D	W	L	L	L	D	W	W	W	D	W	W	W	L	W	W	W
Mumbai City	W	D	W	D	W	W	D	D	W	L	W	L	W	W	W	D	W	W	W	W	W	L
NorthEast United	L	W	D	D	W	L	D	L	D	L	D	D	D	W	L	W	D	L	L	W	L	W
Odisha	W	D	L	L	W	W	W	D	W	D	W	W	W	W	D	D	W	L	D	W	L	L
Punjab	L	L	D	D	L	L	D	D	D	L	W	L	W	W	L	W	L	W	D	L	L	W

Source: Indian Super League
W = Win; D = Draw; L = Lose

== Charity match ==
The Mizoram Football Association in collaboration with Mizo Professional Footballers Association held a charity football match on 21 June 2024. This match featured ISL vs I-League players from Mizoram to raise funds for Cyclone Remal victims.

21 June 2024
17:00 IST

ISL XI (Mizo)	2–2	I-League XI (Mizo)
	Report

Rajiv Gandhi Stadium, Aizawl

== Season statistics ==
As of 4 May 2024

=== Top scorers ===
Rank	Player	Team	Goals
1	(Greece) Dimitrios Diamantakos	Kerala Blasters	13
1	(Fiji) Roy Krishna	Odisha	13
3	(Australia) Jason Cummings	Mohun Bagan SG	12
4	(Brazil) Diego Maurício	Odisha	11
4	(Morocco) Noah Sadaoui	Goa	11
6	(Argentina) Jorge Pereyra Díaz	Mumbai City	10
6	(Spain) Carlos Martínez	Goa	10
6	(India) Lallianzuala Chhangte	Mumbai City	10
6	(Australia) Dimitri Petratos	Mohun Bagan SG	10
10	(Colombia) Wilmar Jordán	Punjab	8
10	(Albania) Armando Sadiku	Mohun Bagan SG	8
10	(India) Vikram Partap Singh	Mumbai City	8
10	(Brazil) Cleiton Silva	East Bengal	8
10	(Slovenia) Luka Majcen	Punjab	8

==== Hat-tricks ====
Player	For	Against	Result	Date	Ref
(Nigeria) Daniel Chima Chukwu	Jamshedpur	Hyderabad	5–0 (A)	21 December 2023	
(India) Vikram Partap Singh	Mumbai City	NorthEast United	4–1 (H)	12 March 2024	
(Morocco) Noah Sadaoui	Goa	Hyderabad	4–0 (H)	5 April 2024	

=== Top assists ===
Rank	Player	Team	Assists
1	(France) Madih Talal	Punjab	10
2	(Brazil) Rafael Crivellaro	Chennaiyin	7
2	(India) Manvir Singh	Mohun Bagan SG	7
2	(Australia) Dimitri Petratos	Mohun Bagan SG	7
5	(India) Lallianzuala Chhangte	Mumbai City	6
5	(India) Amey Ranawade	Odisha	6
7	(India) Mohammad Yasir	Goa	5
7	(Morocco) Noah Sadaoui	Goa	5
9	(India) Jayesh Rane	Mumbai City	4
9	(Uruguay) Adrian Luna	Kerala Blasters	4
9	(Finland) Joni Kauko	Mohun Bagan SG	4
9	(India) Sahal Abdul Samad	Mohun Bagan SG	4
9	(India) Parthib Gogoi	NorthEast United	4
9	(India) Vikram Partap Singh	Mumbai City	4
9	(India) Liston Colaco	Mohun Bagan SG	4
9	(India) Brandon Fernandes	Goa	4
9	(Morocco) Ahmed Jahouh	Odisha	4

=== Clean sheets ===
Rank	Player	Team	Clean sheets
1	(India) Phurba Lachenpa	Mumbai City	9
1	(India) Amrinder Singh	Odisha	9
1	(India) Vishal Kaith	Mohun Bagan SG	9
4	(India) Arshdeep Singh	Goa	7
4	(India) Prabhsukhan Singh Gill	East Bengal	7
6	(India) Rehenesh T. P.	Jamshedpur	5
6	(India) Gurpreet Singh Sandhu	Bengaluru	5
8	(India) Ravi Kumar	Punjab	3
8	(India) Mirshad Michu	NorthEast United	3
8	(India) Debjit Majumder	Chennaiyin	3

=== Discipline ===
==== Player ====
- Most yellow cards: 11
  - (India) Deepak Tangri
- Most red cards: 2
  - (India) Suresh Singh Wangjam
  - (India) Naorem Roshan Singh

==== Club ====
- Most yellow cards: 69
  - East Bengal
- Most red cards: 6
  - Mumbai City

== Attendances ==
=== Regular season ===
Pos	Team	Total	High	Low	Average	Change
1	Mohun Bagan SG	382,695	61,777	22,048	34,790	+38.8%^{†}
2	Kerala Blasters	302,707	34,981	17,650	27,519	−1.1%
3	East Bengal	179,130	59,845	1,500	16,285	+12.8%
4	Jamshedpur	164,957	23,190	7,134	14,996	+2.3%
5	Goa	95,064	12,706	5,326	8,642	−15.4%
6	Bengaluru	88,644	27,923	2,323	8,059	−29.1%
7	Chennaiyin	67,607	8,463	3,521	6,146	−29.4%
8	Odisha	64,978	7,624	4,102	5,907	−4.7%
9	NorthEast United	59,443	10,193	2,893	5,404	+119.9%
10	Mumbai City	46,236	6,911	1,816	4,203	−15.4%
11	Punjab	33,795	5,992	2,016	3,755	+178.8%^{††}
12	Hyderabad	23,899	7,209	380	2,173	−69.8%
	League total	1,509,131	61,777	380	11,489	−5.0%

Updated to games played on 15 April 2024
Source: espn.in
Notes:
^{†}Mohun Bagan SG played as ATK Mohun Bagan FC in the previous season.
^{††}Punjab played in the I-League in the 2022–23 season

=== Attendances by match ===
Team \ Home Game	1	2	3	4	5	6	7	8	9	10	11	Total
Mohun Bagan SG	27,325	29,552	22,048	29,984	30,015	57,983	30,899	29,888	31,332	31,892	61,777	382,695
Kerala Blasters	34,911	34,518	33,830	26,901	30,311	22,715	34,981	17,650	18,857	24,615	23,418	302,707
East Bengal	11,143	11,577	1,500 (Note: Due to the celebration of Durga Puja in Kolkata, East Bengal played their home match against Goa at the Kalinga Stadium, Bhubaneswar)	16,575	6,973	14,977	12,226	11,172	13,153	59,845	19,989	179,130
Jamshedpur	21,238	21,962	23,190	19,296	7,134	10,132	12,605	15,611	14,826	10,331	8,632	164,957
Goa	8,734	8,923	8,127	12,706	11,745	8,674	7,321	5,856	7,384	5,326	10,268	95,064
Bengaluru	5,913	7,143	5,923	7,641	5,282	5,233	4,231	2,323	27,923	7,823	9,239	88,644
Chennaiyin	8,463	6,523	7,254	6,329	5,924	8,162	5,133	3,521	5,297	4,107	6,894	67,607
Odisha	4,102	7,120	7,624	6,817	6,447	5,746	4,748	5,543	5,236	7,348	4,247	64,978
NorthEast United	7,329	5,379	7,739	10,193	4,773	4,379	4,739	3,597	4,397	4,025	2,893	59,443
Mumbai City	6,911	3,327	1,816	3,488	6,282	3,839	2,087	5,866	4,271	3,118	5,231	46,236
Punjab	5,914	3,946	5,992	2,876	3,734	3,945	2,230	3,142	2,016	N/A (Note: Matches were played behind closed doors)	N/A	33,795
Hyderabad	4,676	7,209	1,650 (Note: Due to the 2023 Telangana Legislative Assembly election, Hyderabad played their home match against Mohun Bagan SG at the Kalinga Stadium, Bhubaneswar)	2,128	380	838	1,348	468	426	3,111	1,665	23,899

Legend: Highest Lowest

==== Playoffs ====
Match		Attendance
Knockout 1 (Kalinga)		7,431
Knockout 2 (Fatorda)		12,469
Semi-final 1	First Leg (Kalinga)	9,417
Semi-final 1	Second Leg (VYBK)	62,007
Semi-final 2	First Leg (Fatorda)	17,216
Semi-final 2	Second Leg (MFA)	6,953
Final (VYBK)		62,007
Total		1,77,500
Average		25,357

== Awards ==
Award	Winner	Team
Player of the league	(Australia) Dimitrios Petratos	Mohun Bagan SG
Golden boot	(Greece) Dimitrios Diamantakos	Kerala Blasters
Golden glove	(India) Phurba Lachenpa	Mumbai City
Emerging player of the league	(India) Vikram Partap Singh	Mumbai City
Best pitch	Jamshedpur	
Grassroots award	Goa	
Best elite youth program	Bengaluru	
Source: ISL

Fan's team of the season
Goalkeeper	Defenders	Midfielders	Forwards	Coach
(India) Vishal Kaith (Mohun Bagan SG)	(India) Subhasish Bose (Mohun Bagan SG) (LB/LCB) (Spain) Hector Yuste (Mohun Bagan SG) (CB) (India) Rahul Bheke (Mumbai) (RB/RCB)	(Morocco) Ahmed Jahouh (Odisha) (CM 1) (India) Vibin Mohanan (Kerala Blasters) (CM 2) (France) Madih Talal (Punjab) (RM) (Morocco) Noah Sadaoui (Goa) (LM)	(Australia) Dimitri Petratos (Mohun Bagan SG) (LF) (India) Manvir Singh (Mohun Bagan SG) (RF) (Greece) Dimitrios Diamantakos (Kerala Blasters) (CF)	(Spain) Antonio Habas (Mohun Bagan SG)
Fan's Goal of the Season
(Uruguay) Adrián Luna (Kerala Blasters)
Source: ISL

=== Monthly awards ===
Player of the month
Month	Player	Team	Ref.
October	(Uruguay) Adrián Luna	Kerala Blasters	
November	(Uruguay) Adrián Luna	Kerala Blasters	
December	(Fiji) Roy Krishna	Odisha	
February	(France) Madih Talal	Punjab	
March	(Australia) Dimi Petratos	Mohun Bagan SG	
April	(Australia) Dimi Petratos	Mohun Bagan SG	

Emerging player of the month
Month	Player	Team	Ref.
October	(India) Jay Gupta	Goa	
November	(India) Vibin Mohanan	Kerala Blasters	
December	(India) Isak Vanlalruatfela	Odisha	
February	(India) Vikram Partap Singh	Mumbai City	
March	(India) Vikram Partap Singh	Mumbai City	
April	(India) Abhishek Suryavanshi	Mohun Bagan SG	

=== Weekly awards ===
Team of matchweek
Matchweek	Goalkeeper	Defenders	Midfielders	Forwards	Coach	Ref.
1	(India) Rehenesh T. P. (Jamshedpur)	(India) Amey Ranawade (Odisha) (Brazil) Elsinho (Jamshedpur) (Senegal) Mourtada Fall (Odisha)	(India) Sahal Abdul Samad (Mohun Bagan SG) (India) Lenny Rodrigues (Odisha) (Spain) Saúl Crespo (East Bengal) (Uruguay) Adrián Luna (Kerala Blasters)	(India) Parthib Gogoi (NorthEast United) (Argentina) Jorge Pereyra Díaz (Mumbai City) (Australia) Dimitri Petratos (Mohun Bagan SG)	(Spain) Sergio Lobera (Odisha)	
2	(India) Sachin Suresh (Kerala Blasters)	(Montenegro) Miloš Drinčić (Kerala Blasters) (Australia) Rostyn Griffiths (Mumbai City) (India) Asheer Akhtar (NorthEast United)	(India) Parthib Gogoi (NorthEast United) (India) Phalguni Singh (NorthEast United) (India) Hitesh Sharma (Hyderabad) (France) Hugo Boumous (Mohun Bagan SG)	(Uruguay) Adrián Luna (Kerala Blasters) (Brazil) Cleiton Silva (East Bengal) (Spain) Carlos Martínez (Goa)	(Spain) Juan Pedro Benali (NorthEast United)	
3	(India) Rehenesh T. P. (Jamshedpur)	(India) Jay Gupta (Goa) (Senegal) Mourtada Fall (Odisha) (India) Laldinpuia (Jamshedpur)	(Morocco) Noah Sadaoui (Goa) (Spain) Javi Hernández (Bengaluru) (India) Sahal Abdul Samad (Mohun Bagan SG) (Japan) Rei Tachikawa (Jamsedpur)	(India) Parthib Gogoi (NorthEast United) (Australia) Dimitri Petratos (Mohun Bagan SG) (India) Mahesh Naorem (East Bangal)	(Spain) Juan Ferrando (Mohun Bagan SG)	
4	(India) Ravi Kumar (Punjab)	(India) Sandesh Jhingan (Goa) (Spain) Míchel Zabaco (NorthEast United) (India) Nikhil Poojary (Hyderabad)	(Uruguay) Adrián Luna (Kerala Blasters) (Japan) Rei Tachikawa (Jamsedpur) (India) Amarjit Kiyam (Punjab) (India) Danish Farooq (Kerala Blasters) (Spain) Víctor Rodríguez (Goa)	(Spain) Néstor Albiach (NorthEast United) (Scotland) Connor Shields (Chennaiyin)	(Spain) Manolo Márquez (Goa)	
5	(India) Gurpreet Singh Sandhu (Bengaluru)	(India) Jay Gupta (Goa) (Spain) Míchel Zabaco (NorthEast United) (Montenegro) Slavko Damjanović (Bengaluru) (India) Sandeep Singh (Kerala Blasters)	(Uruguay) Adrián Luna (Kerala Blasters)(C) (Italy) Cristian Battocchio (Chennaiyin) (Brazil) Rafael Crivellaro (Chennaiyin) (Australia) Joe Knowles (Hyderabad)	(Scotland) Connor Shields (Chennaiyin) (Greece) Dimitrios Diamantakos (Kerala Blasters)	(Scotland) Owen Coyle (Chennaiyin)	
6	(India) Sachin Suresh (Kerala Blasters)	(India) Jay Gupta (Goa) (India) Amey Ranawade (Odisha) (India) Nikhil Poojary (Hyderabad)	(India) Rowllin Borges (Goa) (India) Apuia (Mumbai City) (India) Puitea (Odisha) (Uruguay) Adrián Luna (Kerala Blasters)(C)	(India) Liston Colaco (Mohun Bagan SG) (Argentina) Jorge Pereyra Díaz (Mumbai City) (Australia) Ryan Williams (Bengaluru)	(Spain) Sergio Lobera (Odisha)	
7	(India) Gurpreet Singh Sandhu (Bengaluru)	(India) Jay Gupta (Goa) (India) Sandesh Jhingan (Goa)(C) (Montenegro) Miloš Drinčić (Kerala Blasters) (India) Nikhil Poojary (Hyderabad)	(Uruguay) Adrián Luna (Kerala Blasters) (Brazil) Rafael Crivellaro (Chennaiyin) (India) Rowllin Borges (Goa) (India) Boris Singh (Goa)	(Spain) Víctor Rodríguez (Goa) (India) Mahesh Naorem (East Bangal)	(Spain) Manolo Márquez (Goa)	
8	(India) Arshdeep Singh (Goa)	(India) Jay Gupta (Goa) (Australia) Brendan Hamill (Mohun Bagan SG) (Spain) Odei Onaindia (Goa) (India) Asish Rai (Mohun Bagan SG)	(India) Nandhakumar Sekar (East Bangal) (Morocco) Ahmed Jahouh (Odisha) (India) Mahesh Naorem (East Bangal)	(Brazil) Cleiton Silva (East Bengal)(C) (Greece) Dimitrios Diamantakos (Kerala Blasters) (Australia) Jordan Murray (Chennaiyin)	(Spain) Carles Cuadrat (East Bengal)	
9	(India) Phurba Lachenpa (Mumbai City)	(India) Akash Mishra (Mumbai City) (India) Suresh Meitei (Punjab) (India) Laldinpuia (Jamshedpur) (India) Nishu Kumar (East Bengal)	(Morocco) Ahmed Jahouh (Odisha)(C) (Scotland) Greg Stewart (Mumbai City)	(Finland) Petteri Pennanen (Hyderabad) (Netherlands) El Khayati (Mumbai City) (India) Ninthoi (Chennaiyin) (Albania) Armando Sadiku (Mohun Bagan SG)	(India) Anthony Fernandes (Mumbai City)	
10	(India) Phurba Lachenpa (Mumbai City)	(India) Naocha Singh (Kerala Blasters) (India) Subhasish Bose (Mohun Bagan SG) (Jordan) Hijazi Maher (East Bengal) (Senegal) Mourtada Fall (Odisha) (India) Amey Ranawade (Odisha)	(India) Mohammed Aimen (Kerala Blasters) (Morocco) Ahmed Jahouh (Odisha) (Brazil) Rafael Crivellaro (Chennaiyin)	(Fiji) Roy Krishna (Odisha)(C) (Spain) Javi Hernández (Bengaluru)	(Spain) Sergio Lobera (Odisha)	
11	(India) Amrinder Singh (Odisha)	(India) Jessel Carneiro (Bengaluru) (Greece) Dimitrios Chatziisaias (Punjab) (Croatia) Marko Lešković (Kerala Blasters)(C) (India) Laldinpuia (Jamshedpur)	(Scotland) Greg Stewart (Mumbai City) (France) Madih Talal (Punjab) (Morocco) Noah Sadaoui (Goa)	(Ghana) Kwame Peprah (Kerala Blasters) (Nigeria) Daniel Chima (Jamshedpur) (Greece) Dimitrios Diamantakos (Kerala Blasters)	(England) Scott Cooper (Jamshedpur)	
12	(India) Amrinder Singh (Odisha)	(Spain) Tiri (Mumbai) (Croatia) Marko Lešković (Kerala Blasters)(C) (Montenegro) Miloš Drinčić (Kerala Blasters)	(India) Isak Ralte (Odisha) (India) Apuia (Mumbai) (Morocco) Ahmed Jahouh (Odisha) (India) Mohammed Azhar (Kerala Blasters) (India) Vikram Partap Singh (Mumbai)	(Greece) Dimitrios Diamantakos (Kerala Blasters) (Fiji) Roy Krishna (Odisha)	(Serbia) Ivan Vukomanović (Kerala Blasters)	
13	(India) Amrinder Singh (Odisha)	(India) Jay Gupta (Goa) (Greece) Dimitrios Chatziisaias (Punjab) (India) Provat Lakra (Jamshedpur)	(India) Imran Khan (Jamshedpur) (France) Madih Talal (Punjab) (France) Jérémy Manzorro (Jamshedpur) (India) Ajay Chhetri (East Bengal)	(Australia) Dimitri Petratos (Mohun Bagan SG) (Spain) Carlos Martinez (Goa) (Fiji) Roy Krishna (Odisha)(C)	(India) Khalid Jamil (Jamshedpur)	
14	(India) Gurpreet Singh Sandhu (Bengaluru)	(India) Jay Gupta (Goa) (India) Subhasish Bose (Mohun Bagan SG)(C) (India) Nikhil Poojary (Bengaluru)	(Spain) Néstor Albiach (NorthEast United) (India) Suresh Wangjam (Bengaluru) (Morocco) Ahmed Jahouh (Odisha) (India) Manvir Singh (Mohun Bagan SG)	(Fiji) Roy Krishna (Odisha) (Australia) Tomi Juric (NorthEast United) (Brazil) Diego Mauricio (Odisha)	(Spain) Gerard Zaragoza (Bengaluru)	
15	(India) Rehenesh T. P. (Jamshedpur)	(India) Aakash Sangwan (Chennaiyin) (England) Ryan Edwards (Chennaiyin)(C) (India) Rahul Bheke (Mumbai)	(India) Mohammed Sanan (Jamshedpur) (France) Jérémy Manzorro (Jamshedpur) (Finland) Joni Kauko (Mohun Bagan SG) (India) Vikram Partap (Mumbai)	(Australia) Dimitri Petratos (Mohun Bagan SG) (Colombia) Wilmar Jordán (Punjab) (Spain) Iker Guarrotxena (Mumbai)	(Spain) Antonio Lopez Habas (Mohun Bagan SG)	
16	(India) Mirshad Michu (NorthEast United)	(India) Subhasish Bose (Mohun Bagan SG) (India) Asheer Akhtar (NorthEast United) (India) Provat Lakra (Jamshedpur)	(Spain) Alberto Noguera (Mumbai) (India) Deepak Tangri (Mohun Bagan SG) (France) Jérémy Manzorro (Jamshedpur) (Spain) Javi Hernández (Bengaluru)	(Japan) Daisuke Sakai (Kerala Blasters) (Greece) Dimitrios Diamantakos (Kerala Blasters)(C) (India) Bipin Singh (Mumbai)	(Serbia) Ivan Vukomanović (Kerala Blasters)	
17	(India) Prabhsukhan Singh Gill (East Bengal)	(India) Subhasish Bose (Mohun Bagan SG)(C) (Jordan) Hijazi Maher (East Bengal) (Greece) Dimitrios Chatziisaias (Punjab)	(India) Nandhakumar Sekar (East Bangal (India) Mohammad Yasir (Goa) (Morocco) Ahmed Jahouh (Odisha) (India) Manvir Singh (Mohun Bagan SG)	(India) Vikram Partap (Mumbai) (El Salvador) Luka Majcen (Punjab) (France) Madih Talal (Punjab)	(Spain) Antonio Lopez Habas (Mohun Bagan SG)	
18	(India) Debjit Majumder (Chennaiyin)	(India) Muhammad Uvais (Jamshedpur) (Australia) Aleksandar Jovanovic (Bengaluru) (India) Ankit Mukherjee (Chennaiyin)	(France) Madih Talal (Punjab) (Brazil) Rafael Crivellaro (Chennaiyin) (Brazil) João Victor (Hyderabad)(C) (Spain) Javi Hernández (Bengaluru)	(India) Makan Chothe (Hyderabad) (Spain) Iker Guarrotxena (Mumbai) (India) Lallianzuala Chhangte (Mumbai)	(Spain) Gerard Zaragoza (Bengaluru)	
19	(India) Laxmikant Kattimani (Hyderabad)(C)	(India) Alex Saji (Hyderabad) (Spain) Odei Onaindia (Goa) (India) Sajad Parray (Hyderabad)	(India) Vikram Partap (Mumbai) (India) Vibin Mohanan (Kerala Blasters) (Netherlands) Yoëll van Nieff (Mumbai) (France) Madih Talal (Punjab)	(Albania) Armando Sadiku (Mohun Bagan SG) (Slovenia) Luka Majcen (Punjab) (Australia) Dimitri Petratos (Mohun Bagan SG)	(India) Thangboi Singto (Hyderabad)	
20	(India) Debjit Majumder (Chennaiyin)	(England) Ryan Edwards (Chennaiyin)(C) (India) Mehtab Singh (Mumbai) (Senegal) Mourtada Fall (Odisha)	(India) Isak Vanlalruatfela (Odisha) (Finland) Joni Kauko (Mohun Bagan) (Spain) Saúl Crespo (East Bengal) (India) Lallianzuala Chhangte (Mumbai City)	(India) Irfan Yadwad (Chennaiyin) (Brazil) Diego Mauricio (Odisha) (India) Naorem Mahesh Singh (East Bengal)	(Scotland) Owen Coyle (Chennaiyin)	
21	(India) Debjit Majumder (Chennaiyin)	(India) Aakash Sangwan (Chennaiyin) (India) Asheer Akhtar (NorthEast United) (India) Ankit Mukherjee (Odisha)	(Morocco) Noah Sadaoui (Goa) (India) Brandon Fernandes (Goa)(C) (Spain) Saúl Crespo (East Bengal) (India) Lallianzuala Chhangte (Mumbai)	(India) Mohammad Yasir (Goa) (India) Rahim Ali (Chennaiyin) (India) Jithin MS (NorthEast United)	(Scotland) Owen Coyle (Chennaiyin)	
22	(India) Mirshad Michu (NorthEast United)	(India) Subhasish Bose (Mohun Bagan SG) (Spain) Hector Yuste (Mohun Bagan SG) (India) Bekey Oram (NorthEast United)	(India) Saurav Mandal (Kerala Blasters) (India) Mohammed Aimen (Kerala Blasters) (India) Brandon Fernandes (Goa)(C) (India) Anirudh Thapa (Mohun Bagan SG) (France) Madih Talal (Punjab)	(Spain) Carlos Martinez (Goa) (Australia) Dimitri Petratos (Mohun Bagan SG)	(Spain) Antonio Habas (Mohun Bagan SG)	

Fan's goal of the week
Matchweek	Player	Team	Ref.
1	(India) Parthib Gogoi	NorthEast United	
2	(Uruguay) Adrián Luna	Kerala Blasters	
3	(Spain) Javi Hernández	Bengaluru	
4	(India) Naorem Mahesh Singh	East Bengal	
5	(Uruguay) Adrián Luna	Kerala Blasters	
6	(India) Puitea	Odisha	
7	(India) Ninthoi	Chennaiyin	
8	(Greece) Dimitrios Diamantakos	Kerala Blasters	
9	(India) Akash Mishra	Mumbai City	
10	(India) Phalguni Singh	NorthEast United	
11	(Australia) Dimitri Petratos	Mohun Bagan SG	
12	(Greece) Dimitrios Diamantakos	Kerala Blasters	
13	(Albania) Armando Sadiku	Mohun Bagan SG	
14	(Australia) Tomi Juric	NorthEast United	
15	(India) Liston Colaco	Mohun Bagan SG	
16	(Japan) Daisuke Sakai	Kerala Blasters	
17	(Australia) Dimitri Petratos	Mohun Bagan SG	
18	(India) Parthib Gogoi	NorthEast United	
19	(India) Vibin Mohanan	Kerala Blasters	
20	(India) Naorem Mahesh Singh	East Bengal	
21	(Australia) Dimitri Petratos	Mohun Bagan SG	
22	(India) Mohammed Aimen	Kerala Blasters	

=== Match awards ===
Dimitri Petratos has won the most Player of the Match awards (5)

Player of the Match
Match	Player of the Match		Match	Player of the Match		Match	Player of the Match		Match	Player of the Match	
Match	Player	Club	Match	Player	Club	Match	Player	Club	Match	Player	Club
1	(Uruguay) Adrián Luna	Kerala Blasters	40	(India) Suresh Singh Wangjam	Bengaluru	79	(India) Manvir Singh	Mohun Bagan SG	118	(Spain) Saúl Crespo	East Bengal
2	(India) Jerry Mawihmingthanga	Odisha	41	(Morocco) Ahmed Jahouh	Odisha	80	(India) Imran Khan	Jamshedpur	119	(Scotland) Connor Shields (4)	Chennaiyin
3	(Australia) Dimitri Petratos	Mohun Bagan SG	42	(Australia) Brendan Hamill	Mohun Bagan SG	81	(Colombia) Wilmar Jordán	Punjab	120	(Morocco) Noah Sadaoui (3)	Goa
4	(Argentina) Jorge Pereyra Díaz	Mumbai City	43	(India) Sandesh Jhingan (2)	Goa	82	(Spain) Iker Guarrotxena	Mumbai City	121	(India) Abhishek Suryavanshi	Mohun Bagan SG
5	(Brazil) Elsinho	Jamshedpur	44	(India) Nandhakumar Sekar	East Bengal	83	(Australia) Dimitri Petratos (3)	Mohun Bagan SG	122	(Spain) Néstor Albiach (2)	NorthEast United
6	(France) Hugo Boumous	Mohun Bagan SG	45	(Morocco) Ahmed Jahouh (2)	Odisha	84	(France) Jérémy Manzorro (2)	Jamshedpur	123	(India) Prabhsukhan Singh Gill	East Bengal
7	(Argentina) Jorge Pereyra Díaz (2)	Mumbai City	46	(India) Laldinpuia	Jamshedpur	85	(India) Aakash Sangwan	Chennaiyin	124	(India) Lallianzuala Chhangte (3)	Mumbai City
8	(Spain) Néstor Albiach	NorthEast United	47	(Scotland) Greg Stewart	Mumbai City	86	(Finland) Joni Kauko	Mohun Bagan SG	125	(Morocco) Noah Sadaoui (4)	Goa
9	(Brazil) Cleiton Silva	East Bengal	48	(India) Suresh Meitei	Punjab	87	(Brazil) Cleiton Silva (2)	East Bengal	126	(India) Ankit Mukherjee	Chennaiyin
10	(Uruguay) Adrián Luna (2)	Kerala Blasters	49	(Finland) Petteri Pennanen	Hyderabad	88	(India) Vikram Partap Singh (2)	Mumbai City	127	(France) Madih Talal (4)	Punjab
11	(Spain) Odei Onaindia	Goa	50	(Australia) Rostyn Griffiths	Mumbai City	89	(Spain) Míchel Zabaco (3)	NorthEast United	128	(India) Manvir Singh (2)	Mohun Bagan SG
12	(Australia) Ryan Williams	Bengaluru	51	(Brazil) Rafael Crivellaro (2)	Chennaiyin	90	(France) Jérémy Manzorro (3)	Jamshedpur	129	(India) Mohammed Aimen (2)	Kerala Blasters
13	(Japan) Rei Tachikawa	Jamshedpur	52	(India) Mohammed Aimen	Kerala Blasters	91	(India) Bipin Singh	Mumbai City	130	(India) Parthib Gogoi	NorthEast United
14	(Morocco) Mohammed Ali Bemammer	NorthEast United	53	(India) Anirudh Thapa	Mohun Bagan SG	92	(India) Subhasish Bose	Mohun Bagan SG	131	(Spain) Carlos Martínez (2)	Goa
15	(Morocco) Noah Sadaoui	Goa	54	(Spain) Javi Hernández	Bengaluru	93	(India) Sivasakthi Narayanan	Bengaluru	132	(Australia) Dimitri Petratos (5)	Mohun Bagan SG
16	(India) Sahal Abdul Samad	Mohun Bagan SG	55	(Jordan) Hijazi Maher	East Bengal	94	(Greece) Dimitrios Diamantakos	Kerala Blasters	133 (KO1)	(Morocco) Ahmed Jahouh (3)	Odisha
17	(Argentina) Jorge Pereyra Díaz (3)	Mumbai City	56	(India) Isak Vanlalruatfela	Odisha	95	(India) Nandhakumar Sekar (2)	East Bengal	134 (KO2)	(India) Brandon Fernandes	Goa
18	(Spain) Víctor Rodríguez	Goa	57	(France) Madih Talal	Punjab	96	(France) Madih Talal (3)	Punjab	135 (SF1)	(Fiji) Roy Krishna (3)	Odisha
19	(Spain) Míchel Zabaco	NorthEast United	58	(Scotland) Greg Stewart (2)	Mumbai City	97	(Spain) Tiri	Mumbai City	136 (SF2)	(India) Lallianzuala Chhangte (4)	Mumbai City
20	(India) Ravi Kumar	Punjab	59	(Nigeria) Daniel Chima Chukwu	Jamshedpur	98	(India) Princeton Rebello	Odisha	137 (SF1)	(India) Manvir Singh (3)	Mohun Bagan SG
21	(Scotland) Connor Shields	Chennaiyin	60	(India) Souvik Chakrabarti	East Bengal	99	(India) Manvir Singh (2)	Mohun Bagan SG	138 (SF2)	(India) Rahul Bheke	Mumbai City
22	(India) Jay Gupta	Goa	61	(Republic of Ireland) Carl McHugh	Goa	100	(India) Jayesh Rane	Mumbai City	139 (F)	(India) Apuia (2)	Mumbai City
23	(Spain) Míchel Zabaco (2)	NorthEast United	62	(India) Asheer Akhtar	NorthEast United	101	(Spain) Javi Hernández (2)	Bengaluru			
24	(Uruguay) Adrián Luna (3)	Kerala Blasters	63	(Ghana) Kwame Peprah	Kerala Blasters	102	(Scotland) Connor Shields (3)	Chennaiyin			
25	(India) Apuia	Mumbai City	64	(India) Isak Vanlalruatfela (2)	Odisha	103	(India) Makan Chothe	Hyderabad			
26	(Scotland) Connor Shields (2)	Chennaiyin	65	(Croatia) Marko Lešković	Kerala Blasters	104	(Morocco) Noah Sadaoui (2)	Goa			
27	(India) Amey Ranawade	Odisha	66	(India) Vikram Partap Singh	Mumbai City	105	(Greece) Dimitrios Chatziisaias	Punjab			
28	(India) Liston Colaco	Mohun Bagan SG	67	(Fiji) Roy Krishna	Odisha	106	(Spain) Alberto Noguera	Mumbai City			
29	(India) Lallianzuala Chhangte	Mumbai City	68	(Palestine) Yaser Hamed	NorthEast United	107	(India) Alex Saji	Hyderabad			
30	(Spain) Carlos Delgado	Odisha	69	(India) Asheer Akhtar (2)	NorthEast United	108	(Australia) Dimitri Petratos (4)	Mohun Bagan SG			
31	(Australia) Ryan Williams (2)	Bengaluru	70	(Spain) Carlos Martínez	Goa	109	(Republic of Ireland) Carl McHugh (2)	Goa			
32	(India) Sachin Suresh	Kerala Blasters	71	(Fiji) Roy Krishna (2)	Odisha	110	(India) Vikram Partap Singh (3)	Mumbai City			
33	(India) Jay Gupta (2)	Goa	72	(France) Madih Talal (2)	Punjab	111	(Albania) Armando Sadiku	Mohun Bagan SG			
34	(Spain) Juan Mera	Punjab	73	(Australia) Dimitri Petratos (2)	Mohun Bagan SG	112	(India) Boris Singh	Goa			
35	(Brazil) Rafael Crivellaro	Chennaiyin	74	(France) Jérémy Manzorro	Jamshedpur	113	(India) Shankar Sampingiraj	Bengaluru			
36	(Montenegro) Miloš Drinčić	Kerala Blasters	75	(Brazil) Diego Maurício	Odisha	114	(Spain) Javier Siverio	Jamshedpur			
37	(Morocco) Mohammed Ali Bemammer (2)	NorthEast United	76	(India) Sunil Chhetri	Bengaluru	115	(Australia) Jordan Murray (2)	Chennaiyin			
38	(India) Sandesh Jhingan	Goa	77	(Spain) Odei Onaindia (2)	Goa	116	(India) Lallianzuala Chhangte (2)	Mumbai City			
39	(Australia) Jordan Murray	Chennaiyin	78	(Australia) Tomi Juric	NorthEast United	117	(Brazil) Diego Maurício (2)	Odisha			

== ISL Cup Playoffs ==
The ISL Cup/ISL Play-offs is a knockout tournament held after the regular league season.

- Format:
  - Top six teams from the league qualify for the play-offs.
  - The top two teams advance directly to the two-legged semi-finals.
  - Teams ranked 3rd to 6th play a single-legged knockout round, hosted by the higher-ranked team.
- Progression:
  - Winners of the knockout stage join the top two teams in the semi-finals.
  - Semi-finals are played over two legs to determine the finalists.
  - The tournament culminates in a single-leg final hosted by the higher-ranked league side to crown the ISL Cup winner.

=== Bracket ===
Knockout
4	Odisha (a.e.t.)	2
5	Kerala	1
3	Goa	2
6	Chennaiyin	1

Semifinals
1	Mohun Bagan SG	1	2	3
4	Odisha	2	0	2
2	Mumbai City	3	2	5
3	Goa	2	0	2

Finals
1	Mohun Bagan SG	1
2	Mumbai City	3

=== Knockout ===
Team 1	Score	Team 2
Odisha	2–1 (a.e.t.)	Kerala Blasters
Goa	2–1	Chennaiyin

=== Semi-finals ===
Team 1	Agg.	Team 2	1st leg	2nd leg
Mohun Bagan SG	3–2	Odisha	1–2	2–0
Mumbai City	5–2	Goa	3–2	2–0

=== Final ===
4 May 2024
19:30 IST

Mohun Bagan SG	1–3	Mumbai City
Cummings 44'	Report	Pereyra Díaz 53'; Bipin 81'; Vojtuš 90+7'

Vivekananda Yuba Bharati Krirangan, Kolkata
Attendance: 62,007
Referee: Venkatesh R

== See also ==
- Men
  - 2024 Super Cup
  - 2023–24 I-League (Tier II)
  - 2023–24 I-League 2 (Tier III)
  - 2023–24 I-League 3 (Tier IV)
  - 2023–24 Indian State Leagues (Tier V)
  - 2023–24 AFC Champions League (Asia Tier I)
  - 2023–24 AFC Cup (Asia Tier II)
  - 2023 Durand Cup
  - 2024 Reliance Foundation Development League
- Women
  - 2023–24 Indian Women's League
  - 2023–24 Indian Women's League 2
