= André Preto =

Portuguese footballer

Personal information
- Full name: André Matos Dias Pereira
- Date of birth: 18 April 1993 (age 33)
- Place of birth: Guimarães, Portugal
- Height: 1.80 m (5 ft 11 in)
- Position: Goalkeeper

Team information
- Current team: Pevidém

Youth career
- 2002–2003: Pevidém
- 2003–2012: Vitória de Guimarães

Senior career*
Years	Team	Apps	(Gls)
2011–2013	Vitória Guimarães	1	(0)
2013–2014	Vitória Guimarães B	6	(0)
2014	Mumbai City	1	(0)
2015–2016	Varzim II	17	(0)
2016–2017	Tirsense	33	(0)
2017–	Pevidém	88	(0)

International career^{‡}
2008	Portugal U16	2	(0)
2009–2010	Portugal U17	15	(0)
2010	Portugal U18	3	(0)
2011	Portugal U19	3	(0)
2013	Portugal U20	3	(0)
- * Club domestic league appearances and goals as of 5 September 2021 ‡ National team caps and goals as of 18:50, 16 June 2014 (UTC)

André Matos Dias Pereira (born 18 April 1993), also known as Preto, is a Portuguese footballer who plays for Pevidém as a goalkeeper.
