= Jan Štohanzl =

Czech footballer

Personal information
- Date of birth: 20 March 1985 (age 41)
- Place of birth: Třebíč, Czechoslovakia
- Height: 1.74 m (5 ft 9 in)
- Position: Midfielder

Team information
- Current team: Aritma Prague

Youth career
- 1991–1996: Slavoj Polná
- 1996–2004: Vysočina Jihlava

Senior career*
Years	Team	Apps	(Gls)
2005	Vysočina Jihlava	13	(0)
2006–2009	Teplice	51	(2)
2009–2011	Bohemians 1905	52	(9)
2011–2016	Mladá Boleslav	83	(8)
2014	→ Mumbai City (loan)	13	(0)
2015–2016	→ Slavia Prague (loan)	10	(0)
2016–2017	Zbrojovka Brno	11	(0)
2017–2018	MAS Táborsko	13	(2)
2018	Oberlausitz Neugersdorf	6	(1)
2019–	Aritma Prague		

International career
2004	Czech Republic U19	7	(0)
2006	Czech Republic U21	2	(0)
- * Club domestic league appearances and goals as of 14:42, 21 May 2019 (UTC)

Jan Štohanzl (born 20 March 1985) is a Czech football midfielder who plays for SK Aritma Prague.

== Career ==
In 2019, Štohanzl joined SK Aritma Prague.
