= Ishan Debnath =

Indian footballer (born 1991)

Personal information
- Date of birth: 7 June 1991 (age 35)
- Place of birth: Belgharia, West Bengal, India
- Height: 1.78 m (5 ft 10 in)
- Position: Goalkeeper

Youth career
- 2007–2010: Tata FA

Senior career*
Years	Team	Apps	(Gls)
2011–2012	Mumbai	6	(0)
2012–2017	Prayag United	6	(0)
2014	→Mumbai City (loan)	0	(0)
2015	→Delhi Dynamos (loan)	0	(0)
2017–2018	NorthEast United	0	(0)
2018–2020	Southern Samity	0	(0)
- * Club domestic league appearances and goals

Ishan Debnath (Bengali: ঈশান দেবনাথ; born 7 June 1991) is an Indian footballer who plays as a goalkeeper.

== Career ==
Born in West Bengal, Debnath joined Tata FA in 2007 and graduated in 2010.

=== Mumbai ===
==== 2011–12 ====
The 2011–12 football year got off to a good start for Ishan as he made his debut for Mumbai F.C. in the 2011 Indian Federation Cup against Salgaocar. He then made his I-League debut for Mumbai in Mumbai's 4–0 loss to Dempo S.C. on 28 October 2011.

=== Prayag United ===
Debnath signed for Prayag on 3 June 2012.

== Career statistics ==
=== Club ===
As of 9 December 2013

Club	Season	League			Domestic Cups			International			Total		
Club	Season	Apps	G.C.	C.S.	Apps	G.C.	C.S.	Apps	G.C.	C.S.	Apps	G.C.	C.S.
Mumbai	2011–12	6	10	0	3	3	1	-	-	-	9	13	1
Prayag United	2012–13	1	3	0	0	0	0	-	-	-	1	3	0
2013–14	5	9	0	0	0	0	-	-	-	5	9	0	
Career total		12	21	0	3	3	1	0	0	0	15	25	1

Apps – Appearances; G.C. – Goals conceded; C.S. – Clean sheets.
