= Johan Letzelter =

French footballer (born 1984)

Personal information
- Full name: Johan Letzelter
- Date of birth: 19 September 1984 (age 42)
- Place of birth: Montreuil-sous-Bois, France
- Height: 1.78 m (5 ft 10 in)
- Position: Defender

Youth career
- 2000–2004: Chamois Niortais

Senior career*
Years	Team	Apps	(Gls)
2004–2006	Moulins	38	(0)
2006–2009	Calais	93	(5)
2009–2014	Chamois Niortais	136	(1)
2014	Mumbai City	13	(1)
2015–2016	Othellos Athienou	24	(0)
2016–2017	Alki Oroklini	23	(2)
2017–2018	Chauray	5	(0)
- * Club domestic league appearances and goals as of 09:29, 29 May 2017 (UTC)

Johan Letzelter (born 19 September 1984) is a French professional footballer who plays as a defender.
