= Diego Nadaya =

Argentine footballer

Personal information
- Full name: Diego Fernando Nadaya
- Date of birth: 15 September 1989 (age 37)
- Place of birth: Córdoba, Argentina
- Height: 1.78 m (5 ft 10 in)
- Position: Forward

Senior career*
Years	Team	Apps	(Gls)
2006–2009	Instituto	40	(15)
2009–2010	Platense	17	(6)
2010–2011	San Martín SJ	5	(4)
2011	Universidad San Martín	15	(5)
2012	Olmedo	6	(9)
2012	CS Constantine	15	(4)
2013	Cobresal	13	(5)
2013	Olympiacos Volos	15	(8)
2013–2014	Almirante Brown	26	(5)
2014	Mumbai City	10	(7)
2015	Independiente Rivadavia	13	(3)
2016–2017	Amicale	18	(20)
2017–2018	Villa del Rosario		
- * Club domestic league appearances and goals

Diego Fernando Nadaya (born 15 September 1989) is an Argentine footballer.

== Career ==
Nadaya previously played for Instituto Atlético Central Córdoba and Club Atlético Platense.

=== San Martín de San Juan ===
In 2010, he moved to San Martín de San Juan. He made his debut against San Martín de Tucumán in a 0–0 home draw. He completed 5 appearances but he did not manage to score any goal in the league.

=== CD Universidad San Martín ===
In 2011, he moved to CD Universidad San Martín. On 19 February, Nadaya capped his debut with a goal, scoring San Martín's first goal in a 2–1 home win against Universidad César Vallejo Club de Fútbol. He completed 15 appearances having scored 5 goals.

=== Centro Deportivo Olmedo ===
In 2012, he moved to Centro Deportivo Olmedo. He made his debut against Técnico Universitario in a 0–3 home loss. He scored his first goal against Deportivo Quito in a 4–4 win. He completed 10 appearances having scored 1 goal.

=== Olympiacs Volos ===
On 8 February 2013 he moved to Olympiacos Volos His first goal came against Anagennisi Giannitsa in a 1–0 home win. His next goal came three days later against Doxa Drama F.C. He also scored against Thrasyvoulos F.C. in a 3–1 home win.

=== Amicale FC ===
In February 2016, Diego sign for Vanuatu side Amicale FC.
