= Ilias Pollalis =

Greek footballer

Personal information
- Date of birth: 19 November 1992 (age 33)
- Place of birth: Athens, Greece
- Height: 1.89 m (6 ft 2 in)
- Position: Defender

Senior career*
Years	Team	Apps	(Gls)
2012–2013	FK Čáslav	15	(0)
2013–2014	Glyfada	8	(0)
2014	Mumbai City	0	(0)
2015	Royal Géants Athois	0	(0)
2016	Chalkida	0	(0)
- * Club domestic league appearances and goals as of 29 October 2015

Ilias Pollalis (Greek: Ηλίας Πολλάλης; born 19 November 1992) is a Greek football defender who started from Olympiacos's and Panionios's Academies. Ilias is a left footed center back and left back also. He last played for Chalkida.
