= 2022–23 Mumbai City FC season =

Mumbai City
2022–23 season
- Owners: City Football Group (65%); Ranbir Kapoor (18%); Bimal Parekh (17%)
- President: Khaldoon Al Mubarak
- Head coach: Des Buckingham
- Stadium: Mumbai Football Arena
- Indian Super League: 1st
- ISL Play-offs: Semi-finals
- Super Cup: Group Stage
- Durand Cup: Runners-up
- Top goalscorer: League: Jorge Pereyra Díaz (11); All: Lallianzuala Chhangte (18)
- Highest home attendance: 6,407 (vs Kerala Blasters, 8 January 2023)
- Lowest home attendance: 3,187 (vs Northeast United FC, 19 January 2023)
- Average home league attendance: 5071
Home colours	Away colours
- All statistics correct as of 23 October 2022.

The 2022–23 season was the 9th season in the existence of Mumbai City Football Club and their 6th season in the top flight of India football.

Mumbai City FC started their campaign undefeated, with two draws and a 2-0 home win against Odisha FC.

Mumbai City had a near-exemplary Durand Cup in their maiden campaign and became runner-ups. With two big wins, despite a draw and a defeat, they managed to qualify for the top spot in Group and then They earn hard-fought victories in the quarter-final and semi-final against Chennaiyin FC and Mohammedan SC respectively to secure their first-ever spot in a Durand Cup final. They lost against Bengaluru FC in the final.

Lallianzuala Chhangte is the club's top scorer with eighteen goals in all competitions, followed by Jorge Pereyra Díaz who has twelve goals to his name. So far from the home league matches, the club attracted an average attendance at Mumbai Football Arena of only 5,071, an 3.2% decrease from 2019–20 season (Note: ISL played in neutral venue for past two seasons due to COVID-19 pandemic.). The highest attendance recorded was 6,407 for their home match against Kerala Blasters.

== Review and events ==
=== Preseason and Durand Cup ===
After an impressive AFC Champions League campaign, Mumbai City FC strengthened their squad with the right number of signings but also by retentions from last year. They made only six changes to their Durand Cup squad from the AFC Champions League squad. The Islanders made their Durand Cup debut in Group B. They had a near exemplary group stage, as they won 5-1 and 4-1 against Rajasthan United FC and the Indian Navy respectively.

== Player Details ==
As of 14 August 2022

Note: Flags indicate national team as defined under FIFA eligibility rules; some limited exceptions apply. Players may hold more than one non-FIFA nationality.

No.	Pos.	Nation	Player
1	GK	IND	Phurba Lachenpa
2	DF	IND	Rahul Bheke
4	DF	IND	Amey Ranawade
5	DF	IND	Mehtab Singh
6	FW	IND	Vikram Partap Singh Sandhu
7	MF	IND	Lallianzuala Chhangte
8	MF	ESP	Alberto Noguera
9	FW	IND	Gurkirat Singh
10	MF	MAR	Ahmed Jahouh
13	GK	IND	Mohammad Nawaz
14	MF	IND	Rowllin Borges (vice-captain)
15	DF	IND	Sanjeev Stalin
16	MF	IND	Vinit Rai (on loan from Odisha)

No.	Pos.	Nation	Player
17	DF	IND	Mandar Rao Desai
18	DF	AUS	Rostyn Griffiths
22	GK	IND	Bhaskar Roy
23	DF	IND	Vignesh Dakshinamurthy
24	FW	SCO	Greg Stewart
25	DF	SEN	Mourtada Fall (captain)
28	FW	IND	Ayush Chhikara
29	FW	IND	Bipin Singh
30	FW	ARG	Jorge Pereyra Díaz
33	DF	IND	Gursimrat Singh Gill
36	MF	IND	Asif Khan
45	MF	IND	Lalengmawia
