= 2024 Indian Super League final =

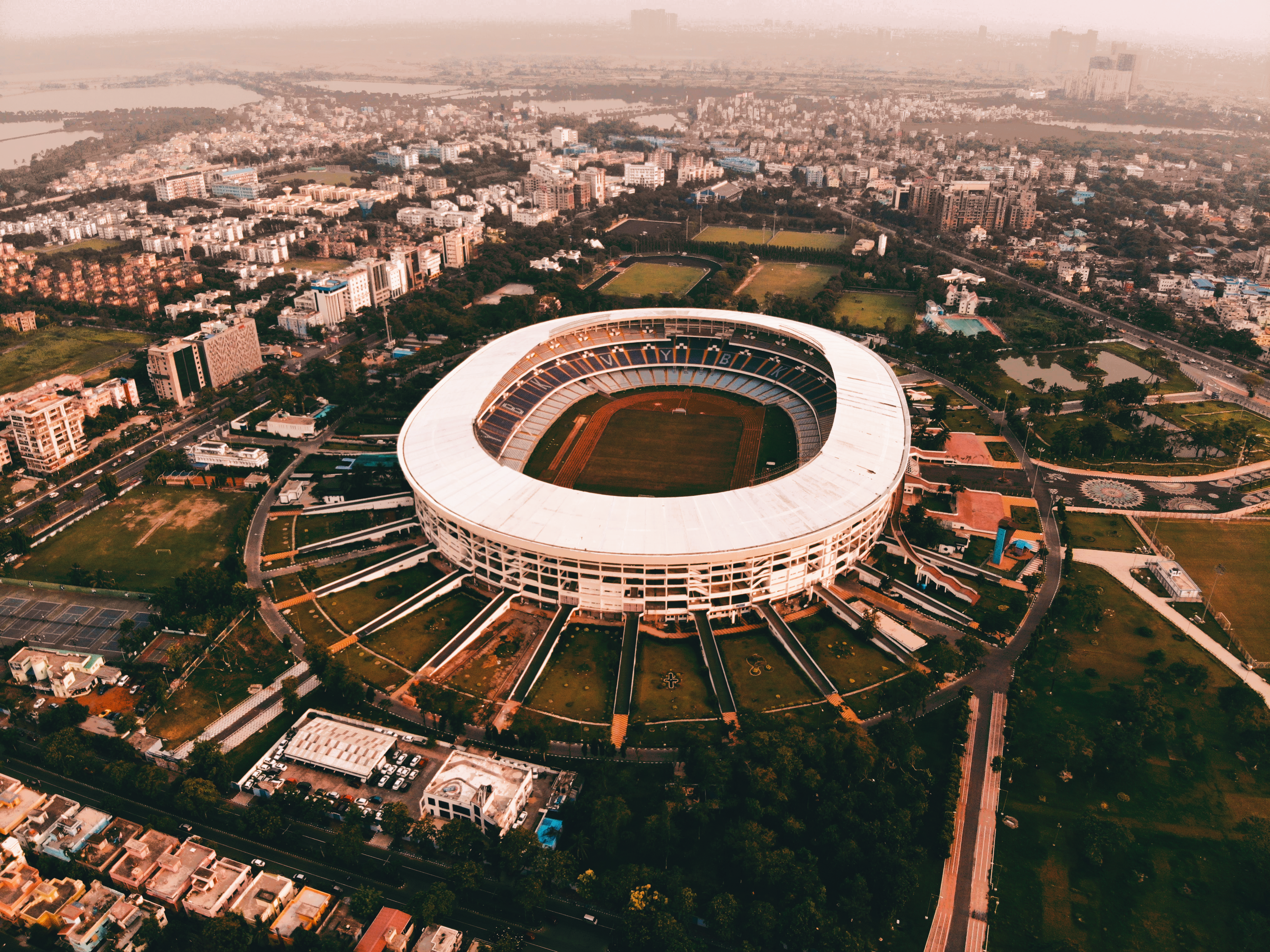
- Yuva Bharati Krirangan in Kolkata had hosted the match.
- Event: 2023–24 Indian Super League
Mohun Bagan SG	Mumbai City
1	3
- Date: 4 May 2024
- Venue: Vivekananda Yuba Bharati Krirangan, Kolkata
- Player of the Match: Lalengmawia Ralte (Mumbai City)
- Referee: Venkatesh R
- Attendance: 62,007

The 2024 Indian Super League cup final was the final match of the 2024 ISL Cup playoffs. It was played on 4 May 2024 between Mohun Bagan SG and Mumbai City at the Vivekananda Yuba Bharati Krirangan in Kolkata.

Mohun Bagan SG played their third final and Mumbai City played their second final. Mumbai City won the match 3–1 to secure their second ISL Cup.

== Background ==
Mohun Bagan SG finished first in the regular season table and won 3–2 aggregate against Odisha in the playoff semi-final to qualify for the final.

Mumbai City FC finished second in the regular season table and won 5–2 aggregate against Goa in the playoff semi-final to qualify for the final.

== Match ==
4 May 2024
19:30 IST

Mohun Bagan SG	1–3	Mumbai City
Cummings 44'	Report	Pereyra Díaz 53'; Bipin 81'; Vojtuš 90+7'

Vivekananda Yuba Bharati Krirangan, Kolkata
Attendance: 62,007
Referee: Venkatesh R

Mohun Bagan SG	Mumbai City

GK	1	(India) Vishal Kaith
DF	15	(India) Subhasish Bose
DF	26	(Spain) Héctor Yuste
DF	4	(India) Anwar Ali
MF	17	(India) Liston Colaco	(yellow card) 90+10'
MF	22	(India) Deepak Tangri		(substituted off) 84'
MF	8	(Finland) Joni Kauko
MF	11	(India) Manvir Singh
FW	7	(India) Anirudh Thapa		(substituted off) 70'
FW	35	(Australia) Jason Cummings
FW	9	(Australia) Dimitri Petratos
Substitutes:
DF	45	(India) Amandeep Bhan
DF	32	(India) Dippendu Biswas
DF	5	(Australia) Brendan Hamill
MF	14	(India) Lalrinliana Hnamte
MF	33	(India) Glan Martins
FW	25	(India) Kiyan Nassiri		(substituted on) 84'
MF	27	(India) Sahal Abdul Samad	(yellow card) 90+2'	(substituted on) 70'
GK	31	(India) Arsh Shaikh
MF	16	(India) Abhishek Suryavanshi
Head coach:
(Spain) Antonio López

GK	1	(India) Phurba Lachenpa
DF	5	(India) Mehtab Singh
DF	4	(Spain) Tiri
DF	35	(Syria) Thaer Krouma
DF	2	(India) Rahul Bheke
MF	45	(India) Lalengmawia Ralte
MF	20	(India) Jayesh Rane	(yellow card) 70'	(substituted off) 78'
MF	10	(Spain) Alberto Noguera		(substituted off) 69'
FW	6	(India) Vikram Partap Singh	(yellow card) 65'
FW	30	(Argentina) Jorge Pereyra Díaz		(substituted off) 72'
FW	7	(India) Lallianzuala Chhangte
Substitutes:
GK	13	(India) Mohammad Nawaz
MF	60	(India) Franklin Nazareth
MF	16	(India) Vinit Rai		(substituted on) 78'
DF	3	(India) Hmingthanmawia
DF	27	(India) Nathan Rodrigues
FW	11	(India) Gurkirat Singh
FW	29	(India) Bipin Singh		(substituted on) 69'
DF	17	(India) Sanjeev Stalin
FW	9	(Slovakia) Jakub Vojtuš	(yellow card) 90+9'	(substituted on) 72'
Head coach:
(Czech Republic) Petr Kratky

Player of the Match

- Lalengmawia Ralte (Mumbai City)

Match rules

- 90 minutes.
- 30 minutes of extra time if necessary.
- Penalty shoot-out if scores still level.
- Nine named substitutes.
- Maximum of five substitutions.
