= Tiago Ribeiro (footballer, born 1992) =

Portuguese footballer

Personal information
- Full name: Tiago Manuel Fernandes Ribeiro
- Date of birth: 15 June 1992 (age 34)
- Place of birth: Zürich, Switzerland
- Height: 1.82 m (6 ft 0 in)
- Position: Midfielder

Youth career
- 2006–2007: Grasshoppers
- 2007–2010: Benfica
- 2010–2011: Braga

Senior career*
Years	Team	Apps	(Gls)
2011–2012	Vizela	3	(0)
2012–2013	Braga B	21	(0)
2013–2014	Grasshoppers B	9	(0)
2014	Mumbai City	11	(0)
2015	Os Turn		
2015–2017	Dietikon	21	(1)
2017–2018	Freienbach	22	(0)
2018–2019	RM Hamm Benfica	0	(0)
2019–2020	Freienbach		

International career
2007–2008	Portugal U16	6	(0)
2008–2009	Portugal U17	11	(1)
2010	Portugal U18	3	(0)
- * Club domestic league appearances and goals as of 16 December 2018

Tiago Manuel Fernandes Ribeiro (born 15 June 1992 in Zürich, Switzerland) is a Portuguese footballer who plays as a defensive midfielder. He also holds Swiss citizenship.
