= 2024 AIFF Super Cup group stage =

Football results

The 2024 Kalinga Super Cup held in Odisha from January 9 to 28, 2024. A total of 16 teams, consisting of 12 ISL and 4 I-League, compete in the group stage to decide the 4 places in the knockout stage.

== Draw ==
The draw for the group stage was conducted at the AIFF Football House in New Delhi on Monday, December 18, 2023.

The teams were divided into four pots, with the 12 Indian Super League teams placed in Pots 1–3, according to their points per match in the ISL 2023-24 as of December 17, 2023. The three I-League teams were in Pot 4.

Five I-League teams confirmed their participation in the Kalinga Super Cup – Gokulam Kerala FC, Sreenidi Deccan FC, Shillong Lajong FC, Inter Kashi, and Rajasthan United FC. The top three of these teams, as per the I-League 2023-24 standings after the matches on December 24, 2023, qualified directly for the Kalinga Super Cup group stage as I-League 1, I-League 2, and I-League 3, respectively. The bottom two teams contested a single-leg qualifying play-off on January 9 to determine the fourth and final I-League team in the group stage. This team, known as I-League 4, was not included in the draw pot and automatically got placed in Group D at Position D4.

Pot 1	Pot 2	Pot 3	Pot 4
Mumbai City; Goa; Mohun Bagan; Kerala Blasters	Odisha; Chennaiyin; East Bengal; NorthEast United	Bengaluru; Jamshedpur; Hyderabad; Punjab	I-League 1 I-League 2 I-League 3

== Format ==
Each group was played in a single round-robin format. The top team advanced to the knockout stage.

=== Tiebreakers ===
The teams were ranked according to points. When tied on points, tiebreakers were applied in the following order:

1. Points in head-to-head matches among tied teams;
2. Goal difference in head-to-head matches among tied teams;
3. Goals scored in head-to-head matches among tied teams;
4. If more than two teams are tied, and after applying all head-to-head criteria above, a subset of teams are still tied, all head-to-head criteria above are reapplied exclusively to this subset of teams;
5. Goal difference in all group matches;
6. Goals scored in all group matches;
7. Drawing of lots.

== Groups ==
=== Group A ===
Pos	Team	Pld	W	D	L	GF	GA	GD	Pts	Qualification	EAB	MBG	SRD	HYD
1	East Bengal	3	3	0	0	8	4	+4	9	Advance to knockout stage	—	3–1	2–1	3–2
2	Mohun Bagan	3	2	0	1	5	5	0	6		—	—	2–1	2–1
3	Sreenidi Deccan	3	1	0	2	6	5	+1	3		—	—	—	4–1
4	Hyderabad	3	0	0	3	4	9	−5	0		—	—	—	—

Source: AIFF
Rules for classification: 1) points; 2) head-to-head points; 3) head-to-head goal difference; 4) goal difference; 5) number of goals scored; 6) drawing of lots

==== Matches ====
9 January 2024 1	East Bengal	3–2	Hyderabad	Bhubaneswar
14:00 IST	Silva 33', 54'; Saúl 80'	Report	Ramhlunchhunga 45'; Nim 79' (pen.)	Stadium: Kalinga Stadium Pitch 1 Man of the Match: Cleiton Silva (East Bengal)

9 January 2024 1	Mohun Bagan	2–1	Sreenidi Deccan	Bhubaneswar
19:30 IST	Cummings 40'; Sadiku 72'	Report	William 30' (pen.)	Stadium: Kalinga Stadium; Man of the Match: Asish Rai (Mohun Bagan)

14 January 2024 2	Mohun Bagan	2–1	Hyderabad	Bhubaneswar
14:00 IST	Zohminghlua 88' (o.g.); Petratos 90+2'	Report	Ramhlunchhunga 7'	Stadium: Kalinga Stadium Pitch 1 Man of the Match: Ramhlunchhunga (Hyderabad)

14 January 2024 2	East Bengal	2–1	Sreenidi Deccan	Bhubaneswar
19:30 IST	Maher 12'; Siverio 32'	Report	William 90+1' (pen.)	Stadium: Kalinga Stadium; Man of the Match: Hijazi Maher (East Bengal)

19 January 2024 3	Hyderabad	1–4	Sreenidi Deccan	Bhubaneswar
14:00 IST	Chothe 83'	Report	Sissoko 5'; Sabiá 7'; Lalromawia 10'; Lewis 36'	Stadium: Kalinga Stadium Pitch 1 Man of the Match: Lalromawia (Sreenidi Deccan)

19 January 2024 3	Mohun Bagan	1–3	East Bengal	Bhubaneswar
19:30 IST	Yuste 19'	Report	Silva 24', 80'; Sekar 63'	Stadium: Kalinga Stadium; Man of the Match: Cleiton Silva (East Bengal)

=== Group B ===
Pos	Team	Pld	W	D	L	GF	GA	GD	Pts	Qualification	JAM	NEU	KER	SHL
1	Jamshedpur	3	3	0	0	7	3	+4	9	Advance to knockout stage	—	2–1	2–3	2–0
2	NorthEast United	3	2	0	1	7	4	+3	6		—	—	4–1	2–1
3	Kerala Blasters	3	1	0	2	6	8	−2	3		—	—	—	3–1
4	Shillong Lajong	3	0	0	3	2	7	−5	0		—	—	—	—

Source: AIFF
Rules for classification: 1) points; 2) head-to-head points; 3) head-to-head goal difference; 4) goal difference; 5) number of goals scored; 6) drawing of lots

==== Matches ====
10 January 2024 1	Kerala Blasters	3–1	Shillong Lajong	Bhubaneswar
14:00 IST	Peprah 15', 27'; Aimen 46'	Report	Paulino 30' (pen.)	Stadium: Kalinga Stadium Pitch 1 Man of the Match: Kwame Peprah (Kerala Blasters)

10 January 2024 1	NorthEast United	1–2	Jamshedpur	Bhubaneswar
19:30 IST	Néstor 17'	Report	Chima 68'; Ambri 89'	Stadium: Kalinga Stadium; Man of the Match: Jérémy Manzorro (Jamshedpur)

15 January 2024 2	NorthEast United	2–1	Shillong Lajong	Bhubaneswar
14:00 IST	Néstor 59', 67' (pen.)	Report	Tardin 17'	Stadium: Kalinga Stadium Pitch 1 Man of the Match: Néstor Albiach (NorthEast United)

15 January 2024 2	Kerala Blasters	2–3	Jamshedpur	Bhubaneswar
19:30 IST	Diamantakos 29' (pen.), 61' (pen.)	Report	Chima 33', 57'; Manzorro 69' (pen.)	Stadium: Kalinga Stadium; Man of the Match: Chima

20 January 2024 3	Jamshedpur	2–0	Shillong Lajong	Bhubaneswar
14:00 IST	Sanan 45+1'; Haokip 73'	Report		Stadium: Kalinga Stadium Pitch 1 Man of the Match: Sanan Mohammed K (Jamshedpur)

20 January 2024 3	Kerala Blasters	1–4	NorthEast United	Bhubaneswar
19:30 IST	Diamantakos 70'	Report	P. Gogoi 2'; Bemammer 68'; Tlang 75'; Jithin 79'	Stadium: Kalinga Stadium; Man of the Match: Mohammed Ali Bemammer (NorthEast United)

=== Group C ===
Pos	Team	Pld	W	D	L	GF	GA	GD	Pts	Qualification	MCI	CHE	PFC	GOK
1	Mumbai City	3	3	0	0	6	3	+3	9	Advance to knockout stage	—	1–0	3–2	2–1
2	Chennaiyin	3	1	1	1	3	2	+1	4		—	—	1–1	2–0
3	Punjab	3	0	2	1	3	4	−1	2		—	—	—	0–0
4	Gokulam Kerala	3	0	1	2	1	4	−3	1		—	—	—	—

Source: AIFF
Rules for classification: 1) points; 2) head-to-head points; 3) head-to-head goal difference; 4) goal difference; 5) number of goals scored; 6) drawing of lots

==== Matches ====
11 January 2024 1	Mumbai City	2–1	Gokulam Kerala	Bhubaneswar
14:00 IST	Ayush Chhikara 76'; El Khayati 90+7' (pen.)	Report	Sánchez 23'	Stadium: Kalinga Stadium Pitch 1 Man of the Match: Abdenasser El Khayati (Mumbai City)

11 January 2024 1	Chennaiyin	1–1	Punjab	Bhubaneswar
19:30 IST	Murray 82'	Report	Jordan 4'	Stadium: Kalinga Stadium; Man of the Match: Connor Shields (Chennaiyin)

16 January 2024 2	Chennaiyin	2–0	Gokulam Kerala	Bhubaneswar
14:00 IST	Shields 25'; Irfan Yadwad 64'	Report		Stadium: Kalinga Stadium Pitch 1 Man of the Match: Connor Shields (Chennaiyin)

16 January 2024 2	Mumbai City	3–2	Punjab	Bhubaneswar
19:30 IST	Ayush Chhikara 37', 56'; Seilenthang Lotjem 90+3'	Report	Majcen 28', 87'	Stadium: Kalinga Stadium; Man of the Match: Ayush Chhikara (Mumbai City)

21 January 2024 3	Punjab	0–0	Gokulam Kerala	Bhubaneswar
14:00 IST		Report		Stadium: Kalinga Stadium Pitch 1 Man of the Match: Melroy Melwin Assisi (Punjab)

21 January 2024 3	Mumbai City	1–0	Chennaiyin	Bhubaneswar
19:30 IST	Valpuia 24'	Report		Stadium: Kalinga Stadium; Man of the Match: Phurba Lachenpa (Mumbai City)

=== Group D ===
Pos	Team	Pld	W	D	L	GF	GA	GD	Pts	Qualification	OFC	FCG	BEN	IKA
1	Odisha	3	3	0	0	7	2	+5	9	Advance to knockout stage	—	3–2	1–0	3–0
2	Goa	3	2	0	1	5	4	+1	6		—	—	1–0	2–1
3	Bengaluru	3	0	1	2	1	3	−2	1		—	—	—	1–1
4	Inter Kashi	3	0	1	2	2	6	−4	1		—	—	—	—

Source: AIFF
Rules for classification: 1) points; 2) head-to-head points; 3) head-to-head goal difference; 4) goal difference; 5) number of goals scored; 6) drawing of lots

==== Matches ====
12 January 2024 1	Goa	2–1	Inter Kashi	Bhubaneswar
14:00 IST	Noah 58'; Martínez 66'	Report	Nikum 78'	Stadium: Kalinga Stadium Pitch 1 Man of the Match: Noah Sadaoui (Goa)

12 January 2024 1	Odisha	1–0	Bengaluru	Bhubaneswar
19:30 IST	Jahouh 21'	Report		Stadium: Kalinga Stadium; Man of the Match: Ahmed Jahouh (Odisha)

17 January 2024 2	Goa	1–0	Bengaluru	Bhubaneswar
14:00 IST	Brison Fernandes 90+3'	Report		Stadium: Kalinga Stadium Pitch 1 Man of the Match: Brison Fernandes (Goa)

17 January 2024 2	Odisha	3–0	Inter Kashi	Bhubaneswar
19:30 IST	Puitea 45+2'; Maurício 59'; Vanlalruatfela 79'	Report		Stadium: Kalinga Stadium; Man of the Match: Diego Maurício (Odisha)

22 January 2024 3	Bengaluru	1–1	Inter Kashi	Bhubaneswar
14:00 IST	Javi 58' (pen.)	Report	Edmund 15'	Stadium: Kalinga Stadium Pitch 1 Man of the Match: Ryan Williams (Bengaluru

21 January 2024 3	Goa	2–3	Odisha	Bhubaneswar
19:30 IST	Martínez 75', 86'	Report	Jahouh 51' (pen.); Fall 61', 66'	Stadium: Kalinga Stadium; Man of the Match: Mourtada Fall (Odisha)
