= 2023–24 Mohun Bagan Super Giant season =

Indian football club season

Mohun Bagan Super Giant
2023–24 season
- Head coach: Juan Ferrando (until 3 January); Antonio Lopez Habas (From 4 January)
- Stadium: Vivekananda Yuba Bharati Krirangan; Mohun Bagan Ground
- Indian Super League: 1st
- ISL Cup: Runners-up
- AFC Cup: Group stage
- Super Cup: Group Stage
- Durand Cup: Champions
- Top goalscorer: League: Jason Cummings (12); All: Jason Cummings (19)
- Highest home attendance: 62,007 vs Odisha FC (ISL)
- Lowest home attendance: 2,892 vs Machhindra (AFC Cup)
- Average home league attendance: 37,058
- Biggest win: 5–0 vs FCI (East Zone) CFL
- Biggest defeat: 5–2 vs Odisha FC AFC Cup 1–4 Goa Indian Super League 1–3 East Bengal Super Cup 1–3 Mumbai City Indian Super League
Home colours	Away colours

The 2023–24 Mohun Bagan Super Giant season was the club's 4th season in Indian Super League and 134th season since its establishment in 1889. The principle team owner, Sanjeev Goenka, announced after winning the 2023 Indian Super League final that ATK Mohun Bagan will be rebranded as Mohun Bagan Super Giant from this season.

On 3 May 2023 Mohun Bagan confirmed 2023–24 AFC Cup preliminary round slot after a 3–1 win via penalties over Hyderabad FC The season formally began on 5 July 2023, with 2023 Calcutta Premier Division, wherein the club fielded a squad of players from the senior team and the youth teams. On 3 September 2023 Mohun Bagan won their 17th Durand Cup title after defeating their arch rivals Emami East Bengal FC 1–0 in the final.

On 15 April 2024 Mohun Bagan became champions by winning their first ISL Shield, overall 6th League trophy after defeating Mumbai City FC 2–1 and finishing the league with 48 points, though they couldn't finish the domestic treble winning the ISL Cup by losing to Mumbai City in the ISL final.

== Squad ==
As of 13 September 2023

First team players
No.	Name	Nat	Date of birth (Age)	Since	Ends	App	Goals	Transfer notes
Goalkeepers
1	Vishal Kaith	(India)	22 July 1996 (age 30)	2022	2025	37	0	Signed from Chennaiyin FC
23	Debnath Mondal	(India)	2 June 1997 (age 29)	2022	2024	0	0	Signed from Churchill Brothers FC Goa
31	Arsh Anwer Shaikh	(India)	9 July 2002 (age 24)	2020	2025	14	0	Signed from ATK
24	Syed Zahid	(India)	16 April 2003 (age 23)	2023	2027	6	0	Signed from Indian Arrows
Defenders
2	Sumit Rathi	(India)	26 August 2001 (age 25)	2020	2025	30	1	Signed from ATK
4	Anwar Ali	(India)	28 August 2000 (age 26)	2023	2027	7	3	Signed from Delhi FC
5	Brendan Hamill	(Australia)	18 September 1992 (age 34)	2022	2024	27	0	Signed from Melbourne Victory FC
15	Subhasish Bose (Captain)	(India)	15 August 1995 (age 31)	2020	2025	108	4	Signed from Mumbai City FC
44	Asish Rai	(India)	27 January 1999 (age 27)	2022	2025	35	0	Signed from Hyderabad FC
26	Héctor Yuste	(Spain)	12 January 1988 (age 38)	2023	2024	4	0	Signed as a free agent
77	Ravi Rana	(India)	15 October 2002 (age 24)	2021	2025	20	0	Signed from Jamshedpur FC
Midfielders
7	Anirudh Thapa	(India)	15 January 1998 (age 28)	2023	2028	9	0	Signed from Chennaiyin FC
	Joni Kauko	(Finland)	12 July 1990 (age 36)	2021	2024	36	9	Signed from Esbjerg
13	Ningomba Engson Singh	(India)	2 January 2003 (age 23)	2020	2024	30	10	Signed from ATK
14	Lalrinliana Hnamte	(India)	29 April 2003 (age 23)	2022	2024	30	1	Signed from East Bengal FC
16	Abhishek Suryavanshi	(India)	12 March 2001 (age 25)	2021	2025	30	1	Youth system
18	Sahal Abdul Samad	(India)	1 April 1997 (age 29)	2023	2029	10	0	Signed from Kerala Blasters FC
33	Glan Martins	(India)	1 July 1994 (age 32)	2023	2025	23	0	Signed from FC Goa
Attackers
9	Dimitri Petratos	(Australia)	10 November 1992 (age 34)	2022	2024	32	14	Signed from Al Wehda FC
11	Manvir Singh	(India)	6 November 1995 (age 31)	2020	2027	88	20	Signed from FC Goa
17	Liston Colaco	(India)	12 November 1998 (age 28)	2021	2027	68	18	Signed from Hyderabad FC
19	Ashique Kuruniyan	(India)	14 June 1997 (age 29)	2022	2027	27	1	Signed from Bengaluru FC
25	Kiyan Nassiri	(India)	17 November 2002 (age 23)	2021	2024	60	9	Youth system
27	Md. Fardin Ali Molla	(India)	10 April 2002 (age 24)	2021	2025	31	5	Signed from Mohammedan SC
35	Jason Cummings	(Australia)	1 August 1995 (age 31)	2023	2026	3	1	Signed from Central Coast Mariners FC
99	Armando Sadiku	(Albania)	27 May 1991 (age 35)	2023	2025	3	0	Signed from Cartagena FC
72	Suhail Bhat	(India)	8 April 2005 (age 21)	2023	2025	16	17	Signed from Indian Arrows

Reserve team players (from Mohun Bagan Super Giant Reserves and Academy)
No.	Name	Date of birth (Age)	Since	Ends	App	Goals	Transfer note
Goalkeepers
	Abhisek Balowary	7 July 2003 (age 23)	2022	2023	0	0	Youth system
	Nandan Roy	27 February 2008 (age 18)	2022	2023	0	0	Youth system
Defenders
3	Raj Basfore	15 March 2003 (age 23)	2022	2025	8	1	Joined from United SC
	Chandan Yadav	18 September 2006 (age 20)	2022	2023	0	0	Youth system
	Dippendu Biswas	24 April 2003 (age 23)	2022	2023	7	1	Youth system
	Balraj Singh	1 January 2004 (age 22)	2022	2023	0	0	Youth system
45	Amandeep Vrish Bhan	3 August 2004 (age 22)	2022	2025	8	0	Joined from Indian Arrows
	Arkaprabha Das	27 August 2003 (age 23)	2023	2023	1	0	Youth system
	Rahul Kumar	25 December 2003 (age 22)	2022	2023	0	0	Joined from Rainbow AC
36	Brijesh Giri	7 January 2003 (age 23)	2022	2025	6	0	Joined from Indian Arrows
Midfielders
	Sibajit Singh	23 July 2004 (age 22)	2022	2025	8	0	Joined from Indian Arrows
	Satvik Sharma	6 November 2004 (age 22)	2022	2023	0	0	Joined from Indian Arrows
	Babai Jana	6 September 2004 (age 22)	2022	2023	0	0	Youth system
	Thumsol Togsin	28 February 2005 (age 21)	2022	2023	3	0	Joined from TRAU FC
	Shiba Mandi	17 August 2006 (age 20)	2022	2023	0	0	Youth system
	Swarnadip Das	10 August 2006 (age 20)	2022	2023	0	0	Youth system
	Milan Mandi	22 August 2006 (age 20)	2022	2023	0	0	Youth system
30	Taison Singh	11 August 2004 (age 22)	2022	2025	9	2	Joined from Indian Arrows
50	Satgougun Kipgen	10 January 2005 (age 21)	2023	2023	2	0	Youth system
Attackers
	Akash Mondal	18 May 2003 (age 23)	2022	2023	1	0	Youth system
	Shubho Paul	4 March 2004 (age 22)	2023	2026	2	0	Joined from Sudeva Delhi FC
	Uttam Hansda	27 January 2003 (age 23)	2022	2023	3	0	Youth system
	Vian Vinay Murgod	20 January 2004 (age 22)	2023	2024	4	2	Joined from Reliance Foundation Youth Champs
	Anup Singh	17 September 2003 (age 23)	2023	2023	1	0	Youth system

Other first team players under contract
No.	Pos	Nat	Name	Date of birth (Age)	Since	Ends	App	Goals	Note
22	DM	(India)	Deepak Tangri	1 February 1999 (age 27)	2021	2026	40	0	Out due to knee injury

== Transfers ==
=== In ===
No.	Pos.	Player	Transferred from	Fee	Date
4	CB	(India) Anwar Ali	(India) Delhi FC	Loan transfer	9 May 2023
35	CF	(Australia) Jason Cummings	(Australia) Central Coast Mariners FC	Free transfer	4 June 2023
7	CM	(India) Anirudh Thapa	(India) Chennaiyin FC	Undisclosed (Note: Media reports indicate ₹3,00,00,000 had been paid as the transfer fee.)	15 June 2023
99	CF	(Albania) Armando Sadiku	(Spain) Cartagena FC	Free transfer	25 June 2023
18	AMF	(India) Sahal Abdul Samad	(India) Kerala Blasters FC	Swap deal + Undisclosed (Note: Media reports indicate ₹90,00,000 had been paid as a part of the swap deal.)	12 July 2023
26	CB	(Spain) Héctor Yuste	(Cyprus) AC Omonia	Free transfer	2 August 2023

=== Out ===
No.	Pos.	Player	Transferred to	Fee	Date
4	CB	(Spain) Tiri	(India) Mumbai City FC	Contract expiration	31 May 2023
3	CB	(Montenegro) Slavko Damjanović	(India) Bengaluru FC	Contract expiration	31 May 2023
21	AMF	(Uruguay) Federico Gallego	(Uruguay) Sud América	Contract expiration	31 May 2023
29	DM	(India) Ricky Shabong	(India) Punjab FC	Mutual termination	31 May 2023
32	DM	(India) Puitea	(India) Odisha FC	Undisclosed	29 June 2023
20	RB	(India) Pritam Kotal	(India) Kerala Blasters FC	Swap deal	12 July 2023
2	DM	(Republic of Ireland) Carl McHugh	(India) FC Goa	Mutual termination	28 July 2023
6	CB	(Guinea) Florentin Pogba	Free agent	Mutual termination	19 August 2023
12	GK	(India) Avilash Paul	(India) Gokulam Kerala FC	Mutual termination	31 August 2023
17	LW	(India) Nongdamba Naorem	(India) Jamshedpur FC	Contract expiration	31 August 2023
10	CM	(France) Hugo Boumous	Free Agent	Mutual termination	10 February 2024

== Competitions ==
=== Overview ===
Competition	First match (round)	Latest match (round)	Final position
CFL Premier Division	5 July; Round 1	17 September; Round 1	Super Six(5th Position)
AFC Cup	16 August; Preliminary round	11 December; Group stage	Group Stage(3rd Position)
Durand Cup	3 August; Group stage	3 September; Final	Champions
Indian Super League	23 September; Matchday 1	15 April; Matchday 22	Champions (1st of 12)
Indian Super League Playoffs	23 April; Semi Final Leg 1	4 May; ISL Cup Final	Runners-up
Super Cup	9 January Group Stage	19 January Group Stage	Group Stage(2nd Position)

Competition	Record							
Competition	Pld	W	D	L	GF	GA	GD	Win %
CFL	15	8	3	4	33	16	+17	53.33
AFC Cup	8	4	1	3	17	13	+4	50.00
Durand Cup	6	5	0	1	13	3	+10	83.33
Indian Super League	25	16	3	6	51	31	+20	64.00
Super Cup	3	2	0	1	5	5	+0	66.67
Total	57	35	7	15	119	68	+51	61.40

Last updated: 4 May 2024
Source: Competitions

=== Durand Cup ===
==== Group Stage ====
Pos	Team	Pld	W	D	L	GF	GA	GD	Pts	Qualification	EAB	MBG	(Bangladesh) BAN	PUN
1	East Bengal (H)	3	2	1	0	4	2	+2	7	Qualify for the knockout stage	—	—	2–2	1–0
2	Mohun Bagan (H)	3	2	0	1	7	1	+6	6	Qualify for the knockout stage	0–1	—	5–0	2–0
3	Bangladesh Army	3	0	2	1	2	7	−5	2		—	—	—	—
4	Punjab	3	0	1	2	0	3	−3	1		—	—	0–0	—

Source: Twitter
Rules for classification: Group stage tiebreakers
(H) Hosts

3 August 2023 1	Mohun Bagan SG	5–0	Bangladesh Army	Kolkata, India
17:45 IST	Colaco 14'; Manvir 29' (pen.); Bhat 39'; Hnamte 58'; Nassiri 89'	Report	Mijanur (red card) 45+3'	Stadium: Vivekananda Yuba Bharati Krirangan; Attendance: 11,195; Referee: Rahul Kumar Gupta; Man of the Match: Liston Colaco

7 August 2023 2	Mohun Bagan SG	2–0	Punjab	Kolkata, India
18:00 IST	Melwin 23' (o.g.); Boumous 48'	Report		Stadium: Kishore Bharati Krirangan; Referee: Ramachandran Venkatesh; Man of the Match: Hugo Boumous

12 August 2023 3	Mohun Bagan SG	0–1	East Bengal	Kolkata, India
16:45 IST		Report	Nandhakumar 60'	Stadium: Vivekananda Yuba Bharati Krirangan; Attendance: 55,000; Referee: Harish Kundu; Man of the Match: Nandhakumar Sekar

==== Knockout ====
27 August 2023 Quarter-final	Mohun Bagan SG	3–1	Mumbai City	Kolkata, India
18:00 IST	Cummings 9' (pen.); Manvir 30'; Ali 63'	Report	Díaz 28'	Stadium: Vivekananda Yuba Bharati Krirangan; Attendance: 19,775; Man of the Match: Hugo Boumous

31 August 2023 Semi-final	Goa	1–2	Mohun Bagan SG	Kolkata, India
18:00 IST	Sadoui 23'	Report	Cummings 42' (pen.); Sadiku 61'	Stadium: Vivekananda Yuba Bharati Krirangan; Attendance: 19,000(approx.); Referee: Ashwin; Man of the Match: Armando Sadiku

3 September 2023 Final	East Bengal	0–1	Mohun Bagan SG	Kolkata, India
16:00 IST		Report	Thapa (red card) 62'; Petratos 71'	Stadium: Vivekananda Yuba Bharati Krirangan; Attendance: 59,751; Referee: Rahul Kumar Gupta; Man of the Match: Vishal Kaith

=== AFC Cup ===
==== Qualifying play-offs ====
16 August 2023 Preliminary round 2	Mohun Bagan SG (India)	3–1	(Nepal) Machhindra	Kolkata, India
19:00 UTC+5:30	Ali 39', 86'; Cummings 59'; Martins (yellow card) 75'	Report	Omolaja (yellow card) 60'; Oloumou 78'	Stadium: Vivekananda Yuba Bharati Krirangan; Attendance: 2,892; Referee: (United Arab Emirates) Ahmed Eisa Mohamed; Man of the Match: Anwar Ali

22 August 2023 Play-off round	Mohun Bagan SG (India)	3–1	(Bangladesh) Dhaka Abahani	Kolkata, India
19:00 UTC+5:30	Cummings 37' (pen.); Bose (yellow card) 52'; Soleimani 58' (o.g.); Sadiku 60'	Report	Stewart 17'; Bablu (yellow card) 9'; Muzaffarov (yellow card) 25'; Sushanto (yellow card) 36'; Yousef (yellow card) 69'; Soleimani (yellow card) 71'	Stadium: Vivekananda Yuba Bharati Krirangan; Attendance: 10,625; Referee: (Iran) Bijan Heydari; Man of the Match: Jason Cummings

==== Group Stage ====
Pos	Team	Pld	W	D	L	GF	GA	GD	Pts	Qualification	ODI	BDK	MBSG	MAZ
1	(India) Odisha	6	4	0	2	17	12	+5	12	Inter-zone play-off semi-finals	—	1–0	0–4	6–1
2	(Bangladesh) Bashundhara Kings	6	3	1	2	10	10	0	10		3–2	—	2–1	2–1
3	(India) Mohun Bagan SG	6	2	1	3	11	11	0	7		2–5	2–2	—	2–1
4	(Maldives) Maziya	6	2	0	4	9	14	−5	6		2–3	3–1	1–0	—

Source: AFC
Rules for classification: Group stage tiebreakers

19 September 2023 1	Odisha (India)	0–4	(India) Mohun Bagan SG	Bhubaneswar, India
19:30 IST	Fall (yellow card) 10' (yellow-red card) 42'; Jahouh (yellow card) 42'; Jadhav (yellow card) 85'	Report	Sahal 46'; Yuste (yellow card) 66'; Petratos 68', 82'; Colaco 79'	Stadium: Kalinga Stadium; Attendance: 5,218; Referee: (Oman) Omar Mubarak Mazaroua Al-Yaqoubi; Man of the Match: Dimitri Petratos

3 October 2023 2	Mohun Bagan SG (India)	2–1	(Maldives) Maziya	Kolkata, India
19:30 IST	Cummings 28', 90+2'	Report	Tomoki Wada 45'	Stadium: Vivekananda Yuba Bharati Krirangan; Attendance: 26,794; Man of the Match: Cummings

24 October 2023 3	Mohun Bagan SG (India)	2–2	(Bangladesh) Bashundhara Kings	Bhubaneswar, India (Note: This match was originally scheduled to be player in Kolkata but shifted out of the state to Bhubaneswar, Odisha due to the clashing with Vijayadashami, where huge amount of Durga idols are immersed in the waters.)
21:30 IST	Petratos 29'; Rai 54'	Report	Dorielton 33'; Robinho 70'	Stadium: Kalinga Stadium; Attendance: 150; Referee: Clifford Postanes Daypuyat (Philippines)

7 November 2023 4	Bashundhara Kings (Bangladesh)	2–1	(India) Mohun Bagan SG	Dhaka, Bangladesh
19:00 IST				Stadium: Bashundhara Kings Arena

27 November 2023 5	Mohun Bagan SG (India)	2–5	(India) Odisha	Kolkata, India
19:30 IST	Boumous 17'; Nassiri 63'		Krishna 29'; Diego Maurício 32'; Goddard 41'; Jadhav 90+2'; Vanlalruatfela 90+5'	Stadium: Vivekananda Yuba Bharati Krirangan; Attendance: 15000; Referee: Gamini Nivon Robesh (Sri Lanka)

12 December 2023 6	Maziya (Maldives)	1–0	(India) Mohun Bagan SG	Malé, Maldives
19:00 IST	Raif 40'			Stadium: National Football Stadium

=== Indian Super League ===
==== League table ====
Pos	Team	Pld	W	D	L	GF	GA	GD	Pts	Qualification
1	Mohun Bagan (C)	22	15	3	4	47	26	+21	48	Qualification for the Champions League Two group stage and semi-finals
2	Mumbai City (W)	22	14	5	3	42	19	+23	47	Qualification for the semi-finals
3	Goa	22	13	6	3	39	21	+18	45	Qualification for the knockouts
4	Odisha	22	11	6	5	35	23	+12	39	Qualification for the knockouts
5	Kerala Blasters	22	10	3	9	32	31	+1	33	Qualification for the knockouts

Source: Indian Super League
Rules for classification: 1) points; 2) head-to-head points; 3) head-to-head goal difference; 4) head-to-head goals scored; 5) goal difference; 6) number of goals scored; 7) fair play ranking
(C) Champions; (W) ISL Cup winners

==== Result summary ====
Overall								Home						Away					
Pld	W	D	L	GF	GA	GD	Pts	W	D	L	GF	GA	GD	W	D	L	GF	GA	GD
25	16	3	6	51	31	+20	51	7	2	4	25	19	+6	9	1	2	26	12	+14

==== Results by round ====
Round	1	2	3	4	5	6	7	8	9	10	11	12	13	14	15	16	17	18	19	20	21	22
Position	1	1	1	1	3	3	3	3	3	5	4	4	3	2	3	2	1	2	2	2	2	1

Updated to match(es) played on 4 June 2023. Source: Indian Super League
A = Away; H = Home; W = Win; D = Draw; L = Loss

==== Matches ====
23 September 2023 1	Mohun Bagan SG	3–1	Punjab FC	Kolkata, India
20:00 IST	Cummings 9'; Petratos 34'; Manvir 63'; Glan Martins (yellow card) 42'; Abhishek Suryavanshi (yellow card) 90'	Report	Luka Majcen 52'; Madih Talal (yellow card) 39'	Stadium: Vivekananda Yuba Bharati Krirangan; Attendance: 27,325; Man of the Match: Petratos

27 September 2023 2	Mohun Bagan SG	1–0	Bengaluru FC	Kolkata, India
20:00 IST	Hugo Boumous 68'	Report		Stadium: Vivekananda Yuba Bharati Krirangan; Attendance: 29,552; Referee: Haris Kundu; Man of the Match: Hugo Boumous

7 October 2023 3	Chennaiyin FC	1–3	Mohun Bagan SG	Chennai, India
20:00 IST	Rafael Crivellaro 54'	Report	Petratos 22'; Cummings 45+3'; Manvir 56'	Stadium: Jawaharlal Nehru Stadium (Chennai); Referee: Ashwin; Man of the Match: Sahal Abdul Samad

1 November 2023 4	Jamshedpur FC	2–3	Mohun Bagan SG	Jamshedpur, India
20:00 IST	Sanan Mohammed 6'; Steve Ambri 86'	Report	Armando Sadiku 29'; Liston Colaco 48'; Kiyan Nassiri 80'	Stadium: JRD Tata Sports Complex; Attendance: 23,190; Man of the Match: Liston Colaco

2 December 2023 5	Hyderabad FC	0–2	Mohun Bagan SG	Hyderabad, India
20:00 IST		Report	Brendan Hamill 85'; Asish Rai 90+6'	Stadium: G. M. C. Balayogi Athletic Stadium

6 December 2023 6	Mohun Bagan SG	2–2	Odisha FC	Kolkata, India
20:00 IST	Armando Sadiku 58', 90+4'	Report	Ahmed Jahouh 31' (pen.), 45+3'	Stadium: Vivekananda Yuba Bharati Krirangan; Attendance: 22048

15 December 2023 7	Northeast United FC	1–3	Mohun Bagan SG	Guwahati, India
20:00 IST	Konsam Phalguni Singh 04'	Report	Deepak Tangri 14'; Cummings 28'; Subhasish Bose 71'	Stadium: Indira Gandhi Athletic Stadium

20 December 2023 8	Mumbai City FC	2–1	Mohun Bagan SG	Mumbai, India
20:00 IST	Greg Stewart 44'; Bipin Singh 73'	Report	Jason Cummings 25'	Stadium: Mumbai Football Arena

23 December 2023 9	Mohun Bagan SG	1–4	FC Goa	Kolkata, India
20:00 IST	Dimi Petratos 45+7'	Report	Noah Sadaoui 10' (pen.) 45+3'; Víctor Rodríguez 42'; Carlos Martínez 90+1' (pen.)	Stadium: Vivekananda Yuba Bharati Krirangan; Attendance: 29984

27 December 2023 10	Mohun Bagan SG	0–1	Kerala Blasters FC	Kolkata, India
20:00 IST		Report	Dimitrios Diamantakos 09'	Stadium: Vivekananda Yuba Bharati Krirangan; Attendance: 30015

3 February 2024 11	Mohun Bagan SG	2–2	East Bengal FC	Kolkata, India
19:30 IST	Armando Sadiku 17'; Dimi Petratos 87'	Report	Ajay Chettri 03'; Cleiton Silva 55' (pen.)	Stadium: Vivekananda Yuba Bharati Krirangan; Attendance: 57983

10 February 2024 12	Mohun Bagan SG	2–0	Hyderabad FC	Kolkata, India
19:30 IST	Anirudh Thapa 12'; Jason Cummings 45+2'	Report		Stadium: Vivekananda Yuba Bharati Krirangan; Attendance: 30899

14 February 2024 13	Mohun Bagan SG	1–0	FC Goa	Margao, India
19:30 IST		Report	Dimi Petratos 74'	Stadium: Fatorda Stadium

17 February 2024 14	Mohun Bagan SG	4–2	Northeast United FC	Kolkata, India
17:00 IST	Liston Colaco 45+1'; Jason Cummings 45+4'; Dimi Petratos 53'; Sahal Abdul Samad 57'	Report	Tomi Juric 6' (pen.) 50'	Stadium: Vivekananda Yuba Bharati Krirangan; Attendance: 29888

24 February 2024 15	Odisha FC	0–0	Mohun Bagan SG	Odisha, India
17:00 IST		Report		Stadium: Kalinga Stadium

1 March 2024 16	Mohun Bagan SG	3–0	Jamshedpur FC	Kolkata, India
19:30 IST	Dimi Petratos 7'; Jason Cummings 68'; Armando Sadiku 80'	Report		Stadium: Vivekananda Yuba Bharati Krirangan; Attendance: 31332

10 March 2024 17	East Bengal FC	1–3	Mohun Bagan SG	Kolkata, India
19:30 IST	Saul Crespo 53'	Report	Jason Cummings 27'; Liston Colaco 36'; Dimi Petratos 45+3' (pen.)	Stadium: Vivekananda Yuba Bharati Krirangan

13 March 2024 18	Kerala Blasters FC	3–4	Mohun Bagan SG	Kochi, India
19:30 IST	Vibin Mohanan 54'; Dimitrios Diamantakos 63', 90+9'	Report	Armando Sadiku 4', 60'; Deepak Tangri 68'; Jason Cummings 90+7'	Stadium: Jawaharlal Nehru Stadium (Kochi)

31 March 2024 19	Mohun Bagan SG	2–3	Chennaiyin FC	Kolkata, India
19:30 IST	Joni Kauko 29'; Dimi Petratos 90+4' (pen.)	Report	Jordan David Murray 72'; Ryan Christopher Edwards 80'; Irfan Yadwad 90+7'	Stadium: Vivekananda Yuba Bharati Krirangan

6 April 2024 20	Punjab FC	0–1	Mohun Bagan SG	Delhi, India
17:00 IST		Report	Dimi Petratos 42'	Stadium: Jawaharlal Nehru Stadium (Delhi)

11 April 2024 21	Bengaluru FC	0–4	Mohun Bagan SG	Bengaluru , India
19:30 IST			Hector Yutse 17'; Manvir Singh 51'; Anirudh Thapa 54'; Armando Sadiku 59'	Stadium: Sree Kanteerava Stadium

14 April 2024 22	Mohun Bagan SG	2-1	Mumbai City FC	Kolkata , India
19:30 IST	Liston Colaco 28'; Jason Cummings 80'	Report	Lallianzuala Chhangte 89'	Stadium: Vivekananda Yuba Bharati Krirangan

=== ISL Playoffs ===
==== Semifinals ====
23 April 2024 Leg 1	Odisha	2–1	Mohun Bagan	Bhubaneswar
19:30 UTC+5:30/IST	Carlos 11'; Krishna 39'	ISL; AIFF; I-League	Manvir 3'	Stadium: Kalinga Stadium; Attendance: 9,417; Referee: Tejas Visvasrao Nagvenkar

28 April 2024 Leg 2	Mohun Bagan	2–0 (3–2 agg.)	Odisha	Kolkata
19:30 UTC+5:30/ IST	Cummings 22'; Samad 90+3'	ISL; AIFF; I-League		Stadium: Vivekananda Yuba Bharati Krirangan; Attendance: 62,007; Referee: Crystal John

==== Final ====
4 May 2024 Final	Mohun Bagan SG	1–3	Mumbai City	Kolkata
19:30 UTC+5:30/IST	Cummings 44'	ISL; I-League	Diáz 53' Bipin 81' Vojtuš 90+7'	Stadium: Vivekananda Yuba Bharati Krirangan; Attendance: 62,007; Referee: R Venkatesh

=== Super Cup ===
==== Group Stage ====
Pos	Team	Pld	W	D	L	GF	GA	GD	Pts	Qualification	EAB	MBG	SRD	HYD
1	East Bengal	3	3	0	0	8	4	+4	9	Advance to knockout stage	—	3–1	2–1	3–2
2	Mohun Bagan	3	2	0	1	5	5	0	6		—	—	2–1	2–1
3	Sreenidi Deccan	3	1	0	2	6	5	+1	3		—	—	—	4–1
4	Hyderabad	3	0	0	3	4	9	−5	0		—	—	—	—

Source: AIFF
Rules for classification: 1) points; 2) head-to-head points; 3) head-to-head goal difference; 4) goal difference; 5) number of goals scored; 6) drawing of lots

9 January 2024 1	Mohun Bagan SG	2–1	Sreenidi Deccan	Bhubaneswar
19:30 IST	Cummings 40'; Sadiku 72'	Report	William Alves 30' (pen.)	Stadium: Kalinga Stadium Main Pitch; Attendance: 200; Referee: Aditya Purkayastha; Man of the Match: Asish Rai

14 January 2024 1	Mohun Bagan SG	2–1	Hyderabad	Bhubaneswar
14:00 IST	Zohminghlua 88' (o.g.); Petratos 90+2' (pen.)	Report	Ramhlunchhunga 7'	Stadium: Kalinga Pitch 1 Attendance: 200; Referee: K Ramdasan; Man of the Match: Ramhlunchhunga

19 January 2024 3	Mohun Bagan SG	1–3	East Bengal	Bhubaneshwar
19:30 IST		Report		Stadium: Kalinga Stadium Main Pitch

== Players statistics ==
=== Appearances ===
As of 14 May 2024

Players with no appearances are not included in the list.

No.	Pos.	Nat.	Name	Durand Cup		Indian Super League		Super Cup		CFL Premier Division		AFC Cup		Total	
No.	Pos.	Nat.	Name	Apps	Starts	Apps	Starts	Apps	Starts	Apps	Starts	Apps	Starts	Apps	Starts
Goalkeepers
1	GK	(India)	Vishal Kaith	5	5	25	25	—				7	7	37	37
23	GK	(India)	Debnath Mondal	—				0	0	3	2	—		3	2
31	GK	(India)	Arsh Anwer Shaikh	1	1	0	0	3	3	7	7	1	1	12	12
41	GK	(India)	Syed Zahid Bukhari	0	0	—				4	4	1	0	5	4
Defenders
2	LB	(India)	Sumit Rathi	2	1	4	2	2	1	8	8	1	1	17	13
3	CB	(India)	Raj Basfore	1	1	0	0	3	3	11	11	1	1	16	16
4	CB	(India)	Anwar Ali	5	5	16	15	—				5	5	26	25
5	CB	(Australia)	Brendan Hamill	4	2	14	9	2	2	—		6	6	26	19
15	LB	(India)	Subhasish Bose	5	5	25	25	—				7	5	37	35
26	CB	(Spain)	Héctor Yuste	3	3	24	23	3	3	—		6	6	36	35
28	DF	(India)	N Rohen Singh	—				0	0	4	4	—		4	4
32	CB	(India)	Dippendu Biswas	0	0	5	2	0	0	10	10	—		15	12
36	LB	(India)	Brijesh Giri	1	0	—				7	2	—		8	2
44	RB	(India)	Asish Rai	3	3	18	10	3	3	—		7	5	31	21
45	LB	(India)	Amandeep Vrish Bhan	1	1	3	2	—		11	11	1	1	16	15
77	RB	(India)	Ravi Rana	2	2	2	0	2	0	9	7	1	1	16	10
44	DF	(India)	Arkaprabha Das	—						1	0	—		1	0
Midfielders
7	CM	(India)	Anirudh Thapa	23	17	4	4	—				7	4	34	25
8	CM	(India)	Sibajit Singh	0	0	—		1	0	13	11	—		14	11
9	AMF	(Australia)	Dimitri Petratos	5	2	23	21	3	3	—		4	3	35	29
10	CM	(France)	Hugo Boumous	5	5	8	5	3	3	—		7	7	23	20
13	AMF	(India)	Thumsol Tongsin	—						2	0	—		2	0
14	CM	(India)	Lalrinliana Hnamte	2	1	13	0	0	0	9	9	3	1	27	11
16	CM	(India)	Abhishek Suryavanshi	2	2	12	9	2	2	8	6	1	1	27	20
18	AMF	(India)	Sahal Abdul Samad	4	3	15	13	—				7	6	26	20
22	DM	(India)	Deepak Tangri	—		18	13	—		1	1	2	1	21	15
33	DM	(India)	Glan Martins	4	2	8	4	2	2	—		7	4	21	12
50	MF	(India)	Satgougun Kipgen	1	0	—				3	1	—		4	1
Attackers
9	CF	(India)	Akash Mondal	—						2	0	—		2	0
10	RW	(India)	Taison Singh	1	1	—		1	0	13	11	1	1	16	13
11	CF	(India)	Manvir Singh	6	4	23	19	—				5	2	34	25
13	RW	(India)	Ningomba Engson Singh	1	0	0	0	2	0	9	5	1	1	13	6
15	CF	(India)	Shubho Paul	—						2	0	—		2	0
17	LW	(India)	Liston Colaco	6	3	19	16	—				7	5	32	24
18	ST	(India)	Vian Vinay Murgod	—						8	4	—		8	4
19	LW	(India)	Ashique Kuruniyan	4	3	—						2	1	6	4
24	ST	(India)	Anup Singh	—						1	0	—		1	0
27	CF	(India)	Md. Fardin Ali Molla	1	0	0	0	—		13	5	1	0	15	5
35	CF	(Australia)	Jason Cummings	4	2	23	16	3	2	—		7	6	37	26
72	CF	(India)	Suhail Bhat	3	2	7	0	3	1	10	9	2	1	25	13
99	CF	(Albania)	Armando Sadiku	4	3	22	12	2	2	—		7	5	35	22
11	CF	(India)	Uttam Hansda	—						3	0	—		3	0
10	ST	(India)	Serto Kom	—						2	0	—		2	0
Players who left the club during the season
40	LW	(India)	Nongdamba Naorem	0	0	—				9	9	—		9	9

=== Goalscorers ===
As of 4 May 2024

Pos	Name	CFL	Durand Cup	AFC Cup	ISL	Super Cup	Total
1	(Australia) Jason Cummings	0	2	4	12	1	19
2	(Australia) Dimitri Petratos	0	1	3	10	1	15
3	(Albania) Armando Sadiku	0	1	1	8	1	11
4	(India) Suhail Bhat	8	1	0	0	1	9
5	(India) Liston Colaco	0	1	2	4	0	7
6	(India) Manvir Singh	0	2	0	4	0	6
7	(India) Kiyan Nassiri	2	1	1	1	0	5
8	(India) Lalrinliana Hnamte	3	1	0	0	0	4
9	(India) Anwar Ali	0	1	2	0	0	3
9	(India) Nongdamba Naorem	3	0	0	0	0	3
9	(India) Sahal Abdul Samad	0	0	1	2	0	3
9	(India) Ningomba Engson Singh	3	0	0	0	0	3
9	(India) Taison Singh	3	0	0	0	0	3
9	(France) Hugo Boumous	0	1	1	1	0	3
10	(India) Deepak Tangri	0	0	0	2	0	2
10	(India) Md. Fardin Ali Molla	2	0	0	0	0	2
10	(India) Vian Vinay Murgod	2	0	0	0	0	2
10	(Spain) Héctor Yuste	0	0	0	1	1	2
10	(India) Anirudh Thapa	0	0	0	2	0	2
10	(India) Ashish Rai	0	0	1	1	0	2
11	(India) Sumit Rathi	1	0	0	0	0	1
11	(India) Raj Basfore	1	0	0	0	0	1
11	(India) Dippendu Biswas	1	0	0	0	0	1
11	(India) Rohen Singh	1	0	0	0	0	1
11	(Finland) Joni Kauko	0	0	0	1	0	1
11	(Australia) Brendan Hamill	0	0	0	1	0	1
11	(India) Subhasish Bose	0	0	0	1	0	1

=== Clean sheets ===
As of 4 May 2024

Pos	Name	CFL	Durand Cup	AFC Cup	ISL	Super Cup	Total
1	(India) Vishal Kaith	0	2	1	9	0	12
2	(India) Arsh Anwer Shaikh	2	1	0	0	0	3
3	(India) Syed Zahid Bukhari	1	0	0	0	0	1

=== Assists ===
As of 4 May 2024

Pos	Name	Durand Cup	AFC Cup Qualifiers	AFC Cup	ISL	Super Cup	Total
1	(Australia) Dimitri Petratos	0	2	1	7	1	11
2	(India) Manvir Singh	1	0	2	7	0	10
3	(India) Sahal Abdul Samad	0	0	1	4	0	5
3	(India) Liston Colaco	1	0	0	4	0	5
4	(India) Joni Kauko	0	0	0	4	0	4
4	(Australia) Jason Cummings	1	0	1	2	0	4
4	(France) Hugo Boumous	1	1	2	0	0	4
5	(Spain) Héctor Yuste	0	0	0	1	0	1
5	(India) Kiyan Nassiri	0	0	0	1	0	1
5	(Albania) Armando Sadiku	0	0	0	1	0	1
5	(Australia) Brendan Hamill	0	0	0	1	0	1
5	(India) Ashique Kuruniyan	1	0	0	0	0	1
5	(India) Asish Rai	0	0	0	0	1	1
5	(India) Anwar Ali	0	0	0	1	0	1

=== Hattricks ===
As of 27 August 2023

Player	Against	Result	Date	Competition
(India) Lalrinliana Hnamte	Tollygunge Agragami	1–5	12 July 2023	2023 CFL Premier Division
(India) Suhail Bhat	Dalhousie	5–2	16 July 2023	2023 CFL Premier Division

== Youth team ==
=== U13 ===
==== AIFF Sub Junior League 2023–24 ====
Pos	Team	Pld	W	D	L	GF	GA	GD	Pts	
1	East Bengal FC	10	8	1	1	56	24	+32	25	Next round
2	BIDHANNAGAR MUNICIPAL SA	10	8	0	2	50	22	+28	24	Next round
3	Mohun Bagan	10	5	2	3	32	22	+10	17	
4	Bengal FA	10	4	1	5	27	33	−6	13	
5	Mohammedan SC	10	2	0	8	22	58	−36	6	
6	United SC	10	1	0	9	18	46	−28	3	

Source: AIFF

=== U15 ===
==== AIFF Junior League 2023–24 ====
===== Zonal Round, Group B =====
Pos	Team	Pld	W	D	L	GF	GA	GD	Pts	
1	Bengal FA	10	7	3	0	24	3	+21	24	Next round
2	Mohun Bagan	10	7	2	1	18	4	+14	23	Next round
3	BIDHANNAGAR MUNICIPAL SA	10	5	1	4	16	20	−4	16	
4	United SC	10	4	0	6	13	19	−6	12	
5	East Bengal FC	10	3	1	6	12	16	−4	10	
6	Mohammedan SC	10	0	1	9	7	28	−21	1	

Source: AIFF

===== Final Group D =====
Pos	Team	Pld	W	D	L	GF	GA	GD	Pts	
1	Punjab FC Reserves and Academy	3	3	0	0	8	2	+6	9	Next round
2	Mohun Bagan	3	2	0	1	7	4	+3	6	Next round
3	Bengal FA	3	1	0	2	4	3	+1	3	
4	Corbett FC	3	0	0	3	1	11	−10	0	

Source: AIFF

===== Knockout Stage =====
21 May 2024 FR1	Football 4 Change Academy u15	5-1	Mohun Bagan u15	Ludhiana, India
7:00 UTC+5:30	Kamgouhao Doungel 18', 37', 57'; Chonminngam Khongsai 82', 90+6'		Rintu Malik 72'	Stadium: Guru Nanak Stadium

=== U17 ===
Note: Flags indicate national team as defined under FIFA eligibility rules; some limited exceptions apply. Players may hold more than one non-FIFA nationality.

No.	Pos.	Nation	Player
1	GK	IND	Aditya Dey
31	GK	IND	Rohon Patra
51	GK	IND	Nandan Roy
2	DF	IND	Showmik Dey
3	DF	IND	Snehmoy Bhumij
4	DF	IND	Joy Das
5	DF	IND	Jayanta Mondal
17	DF	IND	Pabitra Mandi
19	DF	IND	Pradip singh
20	DF	IND	Sagun Marndi
21	DF	IND	Rupam Naskar

No.	Pos.	Nation	Player
6	MF	IND	Suraj Soren
7	MF	IND	Sainak Ghosh
8	MF	IND	Samir Balmiki
11	MF	IND	Keshab Khatik
12	MF	IND	Sahil Kar
18	MF	IND	Pabitra Biswas
23	MF	IND	Irfan Sekh
27	MF	IND	Dev Mal
9	FW	IND	Pritam Gain
14	FW	IND	Aditya Halder
15	FW	IND	Samim SK
22	FW	IND	Akash Singh

=== Group B ===
Pos	Team	Pld	W	D	L	GF	GA	GD	Pts	Qualification	EBFC	MBSG	USC	OFC	MSC	SOD
1	East Bengal Club	10	8	1	1	27	9	+18	25	Disqualified (Note: Disqualified from league on grounds of age fraud.)	—	0–0	3–2	3–2	3–2	6–0
2	Mohun Bagan SG	10	7	1	2	13	6	+7	22	Final round	0–4	—	1–0	3–0	1–0	2–0
3	United SC	10	6	2	2	18	9	+9	20	Final round	2–1	2–0	—	2–2	3–0	1–1
4	Odisha FC	10	4	1	5	16	18	−2	13		0–3	0–2	1–2	—	2–1	5–2
5	Mohammedan SC	10	2	0	8	8	19	−11	6		0–2	0–1	0–3	0–2	—	3–1
6	Sports Odisha	10	0	1	9	6	27	−21	1		1–2	0–3	0–1	0–2	1–2	—

Updated to match(es) played on 14 January 2024. Source: AIFF

==== Group Stage ====
13 December 2023 1	Mohun Bagan u17	1–0	United SC u17	Kolkata, India
8:00 UTC+5:30	Pritam Gain 54'			Stadium: Mohun Bagan Ground

16 December 2023 2	Mohun Bagan u17	3–0	East Bengal u17	Kolkata, India
11:00 UTC+5:30				Stadium: Mohun Bagan Ground

20 December 2023 3	Odisha Football Academy	0–3	Mohun Bagan u17	Odisha, India
12:00 UTC+5:30			Sahil Kar 50'; Rupam Naskar 61'; Pritam Gain 70'

23 December 2023 4	Odisha FC u17	0–2	Mohun Bagan u17	Odisha, India
14:30 UTC+5:30			Akash Singh 54'; Dev Mal 83'	Stadium: Capital Ground

4 January 2024 5	Mohun Bagan u17	1–0	Mohammedan SC u17	Kolkata, India
11:00 UTC+5:30	Pritam Gain 31'			Stadium: Mohun Bagan Ground

7 January 2024 6	Mohun Bagan u17	2–0	Odisha Football Academy	Kolkata, India
11:00 UTC+5:30	Dev Mal 7'; *Sujay Soren 90+1'			Stadium: Mohun Bagan Ground

9 January 2024 7	East Bengalu17	0–0	Mohun Bagan u17	West Bengal, India
13:30 UTC+5:30				Stadium: Eastbengal Ground

14 January 2024 8	Mohammedan SC u17	0–1	Mohun Bagan u17	West Bengal, India
14:30 UTC+5:30			Akash Singh 45+3'	Stadium: Mhommedan sc Ground

17 January 2024 9	Mohun Bagan u17	3–0	Odisha FC u17	Kolkata, India
11:00 UTC+5:30	Aditya Halder 30'; Akash Singh 61'; Pritam Gain 86'			Stadium: Mohun Bagan Ground

20 January 2024 10	United SC u17	2–0	Mohun Bagan u17	West Bengal, India
14:30 UTC+5:30	Shohel Mondal 24'; Joy Deep Bogi 40'			Stadium: Kalyani Stadium

=== Final Group A ===
Pos	Team	Pld	W	D	L	GF	GA	GD	Pts	Qualification	SUD	PUN	MBSG	RAJ
1	Sudeva Delhi FC	3	3	0	0	5	1	+4	9	Knockouts	—	1–0	—	—
2	Punjab FC	3	1	1	1	6	3	+3	4	Knockouts	—	—	2–2	4–0
3	Mohun Bagan SG	3	0	2	1	5	7	−2	2		0–2	—	—	—
4	Rajasthan United	3	0	1	2	4	9	−5	1		1–2	—	3–3	—

Updated to match(es) played on 30 April 2024. Source: AIFF

==== Group Stage ====
14 May 2024 FR1	Rajasthan United FC u17	3-3	Mohun Bagan u17	Vasco da Gama, India
7:30 UTC+5:30	Donboklang Kharjana 40'; Shougrakpam Narendra Singh 55'; Roman Mra 64'		Akash Singh 19', 28', 43'	Stadium: Tilak Maidan

16 May 2024 FR2	Mohun Bagan u17	0-2	Sudeva Delhi FC u17	Vasco da Gama, India
16:30 UTC+5:30			Sumit 44'; Md Mahmad Sami 80'	Stadium: Tilak Maidan

18 May 2024 FR3	Mohun Bagan u17	2-2	Punjab FC u17	Vasco da Gama, India
7:30 UTC+5:30	Akash Singh 30', 71'		Vikash Kisku 39'; Vishal Yadav 45'	Stadium: Tilak Maidan

=== Top Goalscorers ===
As of 20 May 2024

Pos	Name	Goal
1	Akash Singh	8
2	Pritam Gain	4
3	Dev Mal	2
4	Sahil Kar	1
4	Rupan Naskar	1
4	Aditya Halder	1
4	Sujoy Soren	1

=== Top Cleansheets ===
As of 8 March 2024

Pos	Name	Cleen sheets
1	Nandan Roy	7

=== CFL Premier Division ===
==== Round 1 ====
Pos	Team	Pld	W	D	L	GF	GA	GD	Pts	Qualification
1	Mohammedan SC	12	9	2	1	33	9	+24	29	Qualified for the Super Six round
2	Diamond Harbour FC	12	9	2	1	26	5	+21	29	Qualified for the Super Six round
3	Mohun Bagan SG	12	7	3	2	30	13	+17	24	Qualified for the Super Six round
4	Kalighat MS	12	7	3	2	21	8	+13	24	
5	Army Red	12	5	6	1	18	11	+7	21	

Source: The Away End
Rules for classification: 1) points; 2) head-to-head points; 3) head-to-head goal difference; 4) goal difference; 5) number of goals scored; 6) drawing of lots

5 July 2023 Match 1	Pathachakra	1–3	Mohun Bagan SG	Naihati, India
15.30 IST	Surajit 90+4'	Report	Rathi 11'; Engson 20'; Taison 90'	Stadium: Bankimanjali Stadium; Attendance: 2000; Referee: Dipu Roy; Man of the Match: Suhail Ahmad Bhat

12 July 2023 Match 2	Tollygunge Agragami	1–5	Mohun Bagan SG	Barrackpore, India
15.30 IST	Manash 6'	Report	Naorem 24'; Hnamte 48', 78', 81' (pen.); Bhat 52'	Stadium: Bibhutibhushan Bandopadhyay Stadium; Attendance: 2000; Referee: Nripen Halder; Man of the Match: Lalrinliana Hnamte

16 July 2023 Match 3	Mohun Bagan SG	5–2	Dalhousie	Kolkata, India
15.30 IST	Sibahari 66'; Kundu 90+2'	Report	Bhat 26', 43', 49' (pen.); Molla 60', 85'	Stadium: Mohun Bagan Ground; Attendance: 8000; Referee: Pranjal Banerjee; Man of the Match: Suhail Ahmad Bhat

26 July 2023 Match 4	Mohun Bagan SG	1–1	Kalighat MS	Kolkata, India
15.30 IST	Bhat 44' (pen.)	Report	Murmu 29' (pen.)	Stadium: Mohun Bagan Ground; Referee: Surajit Das; Man of the Match: Umer Mukhtar

31 July 2023 Match 5	Calcutta	1–4	Mohun Bagan SG	Barrackpore, India
15.30 IST	Alex 40'	Report	Bhat 31', 45'; Engson 68', 79'	Stadium: Bibhutibhushan Bandopadhyay Stadium; Referee: Bimalendu Mondal; Man of the Match: Umer Mukhtar

5 August 2023 Match 6	Mohun Bagan SG	2–0	United	Kolkata, India
15.30 IST	Naorem 28'; Bhat 87'	Report		Stadium: Mohun Bagan Ground; Referee: Subhankar Khamri; Man of the Match: Nongdamba Naorem

10 August 2023 Match 7	Mohun Bagan SG	5–0	FCI (East Zone)	Kolkata, India
15.30 IST	Basfore 27'; Murgod 45+3'; Naorem 57'; Biswas 84'; Taison 90+2'	Report		Stadium: Mohun Bagan Ground; Man of the Match: Abhishek Suryavanshi

15 August 2023 Match 8	Army Red	2–2	Mohun Bagan SG	Kalyani, India
15.30 IST	Sukhpreet 47'; Somarajan 90+3'	Report	Vian 21'; Nassiri 59'	Stadium: Kalyani Stadium; Man of the Match: Kiyan Nassiri

20 August 2023 Match 9	Mohun Bagan SG	0–2	Southern Samity	Kolkata, India
15.30 IST		Report	Sougata 19', 28'	Stadium: Mohun Bagan Ground; Man of the Match: Sougata Hansda

10 September 2023 Match 10	Mohun Bagan SG	1–0	Peerless SC	Kolkata, India
15.00 IST	Rohen 22'	Report		Stadium: Mohun Bagan Ground; Man of the Match: Rohen Singh

14 September 2023 Match 11	Mohammedan	2–2	Mohun Bagan SG	Kalyani, India
15.00 IST	Lalremsanga 20'; Faiaz 90+6'	Report	Nassiri 58'; Taison 80'	Stadium: Kalyani Stadium; Man of the Match: Kiyan Nassiri

17 September 2023 Match 12	Diamond Harbour FC	1–0	Mohun Bagan SG	Naihati, India
15.00 IST	Pandit 1'; A. Mondal (red card) 36'	Report		Stadium: Naihati Stadium; Man of the Match: Susnata Malik

==== Super Six ====
Pos	Team	Pld	W	D	L	GF	GA	GD	Pts	Qualification
1	Mohammedan (C)	17	14	2	1	44	11	+33	44	Champions
2	East Bengal	17	13	3	1	50	10	+40	42	
3	Diamond Harbour (Q)	16	10	3	3	32	12	+20	33	Eligible for 2024–25 I-League 3 (Note: If the top teams are already playing in national leagues, then the next highest ranked team(s) would be eligible for I-League 3.)
4	Bhawanipore	16	8	4	4	26	18	+8	28	Eligible for 2024–25 I-League 3
5	Mohun Bagan SG	15	8	3	4	33	18	+15	25 (Note: Mohun Bagan Super Giant was deducted 2 points for not fielding a team against East Bengal on 30 November 2023.)	
6	Kidderpore	15	8	1	6	17	29	−12	25	

Source: The Away End
Rules for classification: 1) points; 2) goal difference; 3) number of goals scored; 4) head-to-head points; 5) head-to-head goal difference; 6) fair play ranking; 7) drawing of lots
(C) Champions; (Q) Qualified for the phase indicated
Notes:

29 September 2023 Match 13	Mohammedan	2–0	Mohun Bagan SG	Kolkata, India
15:00 IST	David 13'; Lalremsanga 37'	Report		Stadium: Kishore Bharati Krirangan; Man of the Match: David Lalhlansanga

=== RFDL ===
==== Regional Qualifiers ====
Pos	Team	Pld	W	D	L	GF	GA	GD	Pts	Qualification
1	East Bengal	10	5	3	2	17	12	+5	18	Advance to National group stage
2	Mohun Bagan SG	10	4	3	3	22	13	+9	15	Advance to National group stage
3	Adamas United SA	10	3	4	3	9	13	−4	13	Advance to National group stage
4	Jamshedpur	10	2	6	2	15	13	+2	12	
5	United SC	7	2	3	2	10	8	+2	9	
6	Mohammedan	7	2	2	3	7	10	−3	8	
7	Kalighat MS	7	2	2	3	5	7	−2	8	
8	Odisha	7	1	3	3	7	16	−9	6	

Source: RFDL

3 March 2024 Match 1	Kalighat Milan Sangha	0–2	Mohun Bagan SG	Barrackpore
14.30 IST				Stadium: Barrackpore stadium

6 March 2024 Match 2	Mohammedan	2–2	Mohun Bagan SG	Barrackpore
14.30 IST				Stadium: Barrackpore stadium

8 March 2024 Match 3	Mohun Bagan SG	1–2	Adamas United SA	Kolkata
14.30 IST				Stadium: Rabindra Sarobar Stadium

11 March 2024 Match 4	Jamshedpur	3–0	Mohun Bagan SG	Barrackpore
14.30 IST				Stadium: Barrackpore stadium

15 March 2024 Match 5	Odisha	0–7	Mohun Bagan SG	Barrackpore
14.30 IST				Stadium: Barrackpore stadium

18 March 2024 Match 6	Mohun Bagan SG	5–1	East Bengal	Barrackpore
14.30 IST				Stadium: Barrackpore stadium

21 March 2024 Match 7	Mohun Bagan SG	2–2	United SC	Kolkata
14.30 IST				Stadium: Rabindra Sarobar Stadium

24 March 2024 Match 8	Mohun Bagan SG	0–2	East Bengal	Barrackpore
15.00 IST				Stadium: Barrackpore stadium

27 March 2024 Match 9	Mohun Bagan SG	1–1	Jamshedpur	Kolkata
15.00 IST				Stadium: Rabindra Sarobar Stadium

29 March 2024 Match 10	Adamas United SA	0–2	Mohun Bagan SG	Kolkata
15.00 IST				Stadium: Rabindra Sarobar Stadium

==== National Group ====
Pos	Team	Pld	W	D	L	GF	GA	GD	Pts	Qualification	PFC	SUD	MBS	MCI	PAX
1	Punjab FC (Q)	4	3	1	0	11	1	+10	10	Advance to National championship stage	—	1–1	2–0	5–0	—
2	Sudeva Delhi	4	3	1	0	13	4	+9	10		—	—	3–1	—	7–1
3	Mohun Bagan SG	4	2	0	2	6	6	0	6		—	—	—	2–1	3–0
4	Mumbai City	4	1	0	3	4	10	−6	3		—	1–2	—	—	2–1
5	Pax of Nagoa SC (H)	4	0	0	4	2	15	−13	0		0–3	—	—	—	—

Source: RFDL
Rules for classification: 1) Points; 2) Goal difference; 3) Head-to-head points; 4) Head-to-head goal difference
(H) Hosts; (Q) Qualified for the phase indicated

14 April 2024 Match 1	Punjab FC	2–0	Mohun Bagan SG	Mapusa
16.00 IST				Stadium: Duler Football Stadium

17 April 2024 Match 2	Mohun Bagan SG	2–1	Mumbai City	Mapusa
16.00 IST				Stadium: Duler Football Stadium

20 April 2024 Match 3	Sudeva Delhi	3–1	Mohun Bagan SG	Mapusa
16.00 IST				Stadium: Duler Football Stadium

23 April 2024 Match 4	Mohun Bagan SG	3–0	Pax of Nagoa SC	Mapusa
16.00 IST				Stadium: Duler Football Stadium
