= 2023–24 FC Goa season =

10th season in existence of FC Goa

Goa
2023–24 season
- Owner: Goan Football Club Pvt. Ltd.
- President: Akshay Tandon
- Head coach: Manolo Márquez
- Stadium: Fatorda Stadium, Margao
- Indian Super League: 1st
- Indian Super Cup: TBD
- Durand Cup: Semi-finals
Home colours	Away colours	Third colours

The 2023–24 season is the tenth season in FC Goa's existence, as well as their tenth season in the Indian Super League. It began in April 2023 with the 2023 Durand Cup. FC Goa drew an average home attendance of 8,642 in the 2023-24 ISL.

== Players ==
=== First-team squad ===
As of 1 September 2023

Note: Flags indicate national team as defined under FIFA eligibility rules; some limited exceptions apply. Players may hold more than one non-FIFA nationality.

No.	Pos.	Nation	Player
1	GK	IND	Dheeraj Singh
2	DF	IND	Sanson Pereira
3	DF	IND	Sandesh Jhingan
4	MF	IRL	Carl McHugh
5	DF	IND	Narayan Das
6	DF	IND	Leander D'Cunha
7	FW	MAR	Noah Sadaoui
8	MF	IND	Raynier Fernandes
9	FW	ESP	Carlos Martínez
10	MF	IND	Brandon Fernandes (captain)
13	GK	IND	Arshdeep Singh
14	MF	IND	Ayush Chhetri
15	MF	IND	Udanta Singh

No.	Pos.	Nation	Player
16	DF	ESP	Odei Onaindia
17	MF	IND	Boris Singh
18	MF	IND	Rowllin Borges (on loan from Mumbai City)
20	DF	IND	Seriton Fernandes (vice-captain)
21	DF	IND	Saviour Gama
28	MF	AUS	Paulo Retre
29	FW	IND	Devendra Murgaonkar
32	MF	ESP	Víctor Rodríguez
41	DF	IND	Jay Gupta
42	MF	IND	Brison Fernandes
44	MF	IND	Muhammed Nemil
45	DF	IND	Rayan Menezes
55	GK	IND	Hrithik Tiwari

== Competitions ==
=== Overview ===
Win Draw Loss

Competition	First match	Last match	Starting round	Final position	Record							
Competition	First match	Last match	Starting round	Final position	Pld	W	D	L	GF	GA	GD	Win %
Durand Cup	8 August 2023	31 August 2023	Group stage	Semi-finals	5	3	1	1	16	5	+11	60.00
Super Cup	TBD	TBD	TBD	TBD	0	0	0	0	0	0	+0	—
Super League	21 September 2023	TBD	Matchday 1	TBD	8	6	2	0	12	3	+9	75.00
Total					13	9	3	1	28	8	+20	69.23

Last updated: 11 December 2023.
Source: Soccerway

=== Durand Cup ===
==== Group stage ====
Pos	Team	Pld	W	D	L	GF	GA	GD	Pts	Qualification	GOA	NEU	SHI	DTH
1	Goa	3	2	1	0	11	2	+9	7	Qualify for the knockout stage	—	—	6–0	3–0
2	NorthEast United (H)	3	2	1	0	9	3	+6	7	Qualify for the knockout stage	2–2	—	4–0	3–1
3	Shillong Lajong	3	1	0	2	2	11	−9	3		—	—	—	—
4	Downtown Heroes	3	0	0	3	2	8	−6	0		—	—	1–2	—

Source: Twitter
Rules for classification: Group stage tiebreakers
(H) Hosts

===== Matches =====
8 August 2023	Goa	6–0	Shillong Lajong	Guwahati
15.00 IST	Borges 15'; Sadaoui 20', 27', 86'; Rodríguez 68'; Martínez 83'	Report		Stadium: Indira Gandhi Athletic Stadium; Man of the Match: Noah Sadaoui (Goa)

12 August 2023	NorthEast United	2–2	Goa	Guwahati
14.30 IST	M. Singh 24'; Jhingan 52' (o.g.)	Report	Borges 45+4'; Sadaoui 80' (pen.)	Stadium: Indira Gandhi Athletic Stadium; Man of the Match: Seriton Fernandes (Goa)

16 August 2023	Goa	3–0	Downtown Heroes	Guwahati
15.00 IST	Nemil 19'; Martínez 38'; Murgaokar 90+6'	Report		Stadium: Indira Gandhi Athletic Stadium; Man of the Match: Carlos Martínez (Goa)

==== Knockout stage ====
Quarter-finals
24 August – Guwahati
Indian Army	0
NorthEast United	1
25 August – Kolkata
East Bengal	2
Gokulam Kerala	1
26 August – Guwahati
Goa	4
Chennaiyin	1
27 August – Kolkata
Mumbai City	1
Mohun Bagan	3

Semi-finals
29 August – Kolkata
NorthEast United	2(3)
East Bengal	2(5)
31 August – Kolkata
Goa	1
Mohun Bagan	2

Final
3 September – Kolkata
East Bengal	0
Mohun Bagan	1

===== Matches =====
26 August 2023	Goa	4–1	Chennaiyin	Guwahati
18:00 IST	Carl McHugh 29'; Carlos Martínez 37'; Noah Sadaoui 90+2'; Víctor Rodríguez 90+4'	Report	Bikash Yumnam 5'	Stadium: Indira Gandhi Athletic Stadium

31 August 2023	Goa	1–2	Mohun Bagan SG	Kolkata
18:00 IST	Noah Sadaoui 23'	Report	Jason Cummings 42' (pen.); Armando Sadiku 61'	Stadium: Vivekananda Yuba Bharati Krirangan

=== Indian Super League ===
==== League table ====
Pos	Team	Pld	W	D	L	GF	GA	GD	Pts	Qualification
1	Mohun Bagan (C)	22	15	3	4	47	26	+21	48	Qualification for the Champions League Two group stage and semi-finals
2	Mumbai City (W)	22	14	5	3	42	19	+23	47	Qualification for the semi-finals
3	Goa	22	13	6	3	39	21	+18	45	Qualification for the knockouts
4	Odisha	22	11	6	5	35	23	+12	39	Qualification for the knockouts
5	Kerala Blasters	22	10	3	9	32	31	+1	33	Qualification for the knockouts

Source: Indian Super League
Rules for classification: 1) points; 2) head-to-head points; 3) head-to-head goal difference; 4) head-to-head goals scored; 5) goal difference; 6) number of goals scored; 7) fair play ranking
(C) Champions; (W) ISL Cup winners

==== Results summary ====
Overall								Home						Away					
Pld	W	D	L	GF	GA	GD	Pts	W	D	L	GF	GA	GD	W	D	L	GF	GA	GD
8	6	2	0	11	3	+8	20	4	1	0	6	2	+4	2	1	0	5	1	+4

Last updated: 12 December 2023.
Source: Indian Super League
