= 2023 Durand Cup group stage =

Group stage of 2023 Durand Cup

Tournament details
- Country: India
- Teams: 24

The 2023 IndianOil Durand Cup group stage will be played from 3 August to 22 August 2023. A total of 24 teams, consisting of 12 ISL clubs, 5 I-League clubs, 1 I-League 2 club, 1 regional league team, 3 Indian Armed Forces teams and 2 Foreign armed force teams, compete in the group stage to decide the 8 places in the knockout stage.

== Format ==
In the group stage, each group is played on a single round-robin format. The table-toppers from each group & two best second-placed teams from group stage advances to the knockout stage.

=== Tiebreakers ===
The teams are ranked according to points (3 points for a win, 1 point for a draw, 0 points for a loss). If tied on points, tiebreakers are applied in the following order:

1. Points in head-to-head matches among tied teams;
2. Goal difference in head-to-head matches among tied teams;
3. Goals scored in head-to-head matches among tied teams;
4. If more than two teams are tied, and after applying all head-to-head criteria above, a subset of teams are still tied, all head-to-head criteria above are reapplied exclusively to this subset of teams;
5. Goal difference in all group matches;
6. Goals scored in all group matches;
7. Drawing of lots.

== Centralised venues ==
On 10 July, Durand Cup Organising Committee announced that the tournament would be played across more than one city—3 cities—Kolkata, Guwahati and Kokrajhar. The six groups were assigned one or more than one centralised venue, with four out of the six groups having at least one of the teams in the group based from the host city, except Group C and Group E.

- Group A: Kolkata, West Bengal (Vivekananda Yuba Bharati Krirangan and Kishore Bharati Krirangan)
- Group B: Kolkata, West Bengal (Vivekananda Yuba Bharati Krirangan, Kishore Bharati Krirangan and Mohun Bagan Ground)
- Group C: Kolkata, West Bengal (Kishore Bharati Krirangan, Mohun Bagan Ground and East Bengal Ground)
- Group D: Guwahati, Assam and Kokrajhar, Assam (Indira Gandhi Athletic Stadium and SAI Stadium)
- Group E: Guwahati, Assam and Kokrajhar, Assam (Indira Gandhi Athletic Stadium and SAI Stadium)
- Group F: Kokrajhar, Assam (SAI Stadium)

== Group A ==
Pos	Team	Pld	W	D	L	GF	GA	GD	Pts	Qualification	EAB	MBG	(Bangladesh) BAN	PUN
1	East Bengal (H)	3	2	1	0	4	2	+2	7	Qualify for the knockout stage	—	—	2–2	1–0
2	Mohun Bagan (H)	3	2	0	1	7	1	+6	6	Qualify for the knockout stage	0–1	—	5–0	2–0
3	Bangladesh Army	3	0	2	1	2	7	−5	2		—	—	—	—
4	Punjab	3	0	1	2	0	3	−3	1		—	—	0–0	—

Source: Twitter
Rules for classification: Group stage tiebreakers
(H) Hosts

=== Matches ===
3 August 2023	Mohun Bagan	5–0	Bangladesh Army	Kolkata
17:45 IST	Colaco 15'; M. Singh 30' (pen.); Bhat 40'; Hnamte 58'; Nassiri 89'	Report	M. Rahman (yellow card) 10' (yellow-red card) 45+3'	Stadium: Vivekananda Yuba Bharati Krirangan; Attendance: 11,195; Referee: Rahul Kumar Gupta; Man of the Match: Liston Colaco (Mohun Bagan)

6 August 2023	East Bengal	2–2	Bangladesh Army	Kolkata
16:45 IST	Crespo 34' (pen.); Siverio 45+4'; N. Kumar (red card) 67'	Report	Emon 88'; M. Pradhan 90+6'	Stadium: Vivekananda Yuba Bharati Krirangan; Attendance: 9,820; Referee: I Jamal Mohamed; Man of the Match: Harmanjot Singh Khabra (East Bengal)

7 August 2023	Mohun Bagan	2–0	Punjab	Kolkata
18:00 IST	M. Assisi 23' (o.g.); Boumous 48'	Report		Stadium: Kishore Bharati Krirangan; Referee: Venkatesh R Man of the Match: Hugo Boumous (Mohun Bagan SG)

10 August 2023	Punjab	0–0	Bangladesh Army	Kolkata
18:00 IST		Report		Stadium: Vivekananda Yuba Bharati Krirangan; Man of the Match: Ashraful Islam Rana (Bangladesh Army)

12 August 2023	Mohun Bagan	0–1	East Bengal	Kolkata
16:45 IST		Report	Sekar 61'	Stadium: Vivekananda Yuba Bharati Krirangan; Attendance: 56,833; Man of the Match: Nandhakumar Sekar (East Bengal)

16 August 2023	East Bengal	1–0	Punjab	Kolkata
18:00 IST	Siverio 22'	Report		Stadium: Kishore Bharati Krirangan; Man of the Match: Nandhakumar Sekar (East Bengal)

== Group B ==
Pos	Team	Pld	W	D	L	GF	GA	GD	Pts	Qualification	MCI	MSC	JAM	INV
1	Mumbai City	3	3	0	0	12	1	+11	9	Qualify for the knockout stage	—	—	5–0	4–0
2	Mohammedan (H)	3	2	0	1	9	4	+5	6		1–3	—	6–0	2–1
3	Jamshedpur	3	1	0	2	1	11	−10	3		—	—	—	1–0
4	Indian Navy	3	0	0	3	1	7	−6	0		—	—	—	—

Source: Twitter
Rules for classification: Group stage tiebreakers
(H) Hosts

=== Matches ===
5 August 2023	Mohammedan	1–3	Mumbai City	Kolkata
16.45 IST	D. Lalhlansanga 42'	Report	Griffiths 12'; Díaz 24'; Chhangte 35'	Stadium: Kishore Bharati Krirangan; Attendance: 3,652; Referee: Harish Kundu; Man of the Match: Alberto Noguera (Mumbai City)

8 August 2023	Mumbai City	5–0	Jamshedpur	Kolkata
18.00 IST	Díaz 8', 14'; Noguera 40'; van Nieff 47'; V. Singh 55'	Report		Stadium: Vivekananda Yuba Bharati Krirangan; Referee: Pranjal Banerjee; Man of the Match: Lalengmawia Ralte (Mumbai City)

11 August 2023	Mohammedan	2–1	Indian Navy	Kolkata
15.00 IST	D. Lalhlansanga 50'; Lalremsanga 69'; D. Moirangthem (yellow card) 88' (yellow-red card) 90+5'	Report	Britto 90+7' (pen.)	Stadium: Kishore Bharati Krirangan

17 August 2023	Jamshedpur	1–0	Indian Navy	Kolkata
15.00 IST	A. Koli 70'	Report		Stadium: Mohun Bagan Ground; Man of the Match: Ashley Alban Koli (Jamshedpur)

19 August 2023	Mumbai City	4–0	Indian Navy	Kolkata
14.30 IST	Díaz 34'; Stewart 62'; G. Singh 74'; N. Rodrigues 90+4'	Report		Stadium: Vivekananda Yuba Bharati Krirangan; Referee: I Jamal Mohamed; Man of the Match: Bipin Singh (Mumbai City)

20 August 2023	Mohammedan	6–0	Jamshedpur	Kolkata
16.45 IST	Lalremsanga 10', 16'; D. Lalhlansanga 28', 69', 82', 89'	Report		Stadium: Kishore Bharati Krirangan; Man of the Match: David Lalhlansanga (Mohammedan)

== Group C ==
Pos	Team	Pld	W	D	L	GF	GA	GD	Pts	Qualification	GOK	BEN	KER	IAF
1	Gokulam Kerala	3	2	0	1	6	5	+1	6	Qualify for the knockout stage	—	—	—	2–0
2	Bengaluru	3	1	2	0	5	3	+2	5		2–0	—	2–2	1–1
3	Kerala Blasters	3	1	1	1	10	6	+4	4		3–4	—	—	5–0
4	Indian Air Force	3	0	1	2	1	8	−7	1		—	—	—	—

Source: Twitter
Rules for classification: Group stage tiebreakers

=== Matches ===
9 August 2023	Gokulam Kerala	2–0	Indian Air Force	Kolkata
16.45 IST	Sourav 36'; Sreekuttan 67'	Report		Stadium: Kishore Bharati Krirangan; Referee: K Ramdasan

13 August 2023	Kerala Blasters	3–4	Gokulam Kerala	Kolkata
14.30 IST	J. Emmanuel 35'; Das 54'; Luna 77'	Report	Bouba 17'; Sreekuttan 43'; N. Singh 45+1' (o.g.); Abhijith 47'	Stadium: Mohun Bagan Ground; Attendance: 234; Man of the Match: Nili Perdomo (Gokulam Kerala)

14 August 2023	Bengaluru	1–1	Indian Air Force	Kolkata
18.00 IST	S. Johnson Singh 58'	Report	V. Kumar 20'	Stadium: Kishore Bharati Krirangan; Man of the Match: Vivek Kumar (Indian Air Force)

18 August 2023	Bengaluru	2–2	Kerala Blasters	Kolkata
18.00 IST	Lalrindika 38'; A. Jha 51'	Report	J. Emmanuel 14'; Ruivah (yellow card) 42' (yellow-red card) 85'; M. Aimen 84'	Stadium: Kishore Bharati Krirangan; Man of the Match: Bekey Oram (Bengaluru)

21 August 2023	Kerala Blasters	5–0	Indian Air Force	Kolkata
15.00 IST	M. Aimen 9'; B. Singh 12', 61', 82'; Farooq 57'	Report		Stadium: East Bengal Ground; Man of the Match: Bidyashagar Singh (Kerala Blasters)

22 August 2023	Bengaluru	2–0	Gokulam Kerala	Kolkata
18.00 IST	R. Yadav 58'; Lalpekhlua 89'	Report		Stadium: Kishore Bharati Krirangan; Man of the Match: Robin Yadav (Bengaluru)

== Group D ==
Pos	Team	Pld	W	D	L	GF	GA	GD	Pts	Qualification	GOA	NEU	SHI	DTH
1	Goa	3	2	1	0	11	2	+9	7	Qualify for the knockout stage	—	—	6–0	3–0
2	NorthEast United (H)	3	2	1	0	9	3	+6	7	Qualify for the knockout stage	2–2	—	4–0	3–1
3	Shillong Lajong	3	1	0	2	2	11	−9	3		—	—	—	—
4	Downtown Heroes	3	0	0	3	2	8	−6	0		—	—	1–2	—

Source: Twitter
Rules for classification: Group stage tiebreakers
(H) Hosts

=== Matches ===
4 August 2023	NorthEast United	4–0	Shillong Lajong	Guwahati
18.00 IST	Gogoi 26', 65', 70'; Philippoteaux 35' (pen.)	Report		Stadium: Indira Gandhi Athletic Stadium; Attendance: 13,450; Referee: Senthil Nathan Sekaran; Man of the Match: Parthib Gogoi (NorthEast United)

8 August 2023	Goa	6–0	Shillong Lajong	Guwahati
15.00 IST	Borges 15'; Sadaoui 20', 27', 86'; Rodríguez 68'; Martínez 83'	Report		Stadium: Indira Gandhi Athletic Stadium; Man of the Match: Noah Sadaoui (Goa)

12 August 2023	NorthEast United	2–2	Goa	Guwahati
14.30 IST	M. Singh 24'; Jhingan 52' (o.g.)	Report	Borges 45+4'; Sadaoui 80' (pen.)	Stadium: Indira Gandhi Athletic Stadium; Man of the Match: Seriton Fernandes (Goa)

13 August 2023	Downtown Heroes	1–2	Shillong Lajong	Kokrajhar
16.45 IST	R. Kharbudon 24' (o.g.)	Report	N. Haokip (red card) 10'; R. Kharbudon 36', 52'	Stadium: SAI Stadium; Man of the Match: Ronney Kharbudon (Shillong Lajong)

16 August 2023	Goa	3–0	Downtown Heroes	Guwahati
15.00 IST	Nemil 19'; Martínez 38'; Murgaokar 90+6'	Report		Stadium: Indira Gandhi Athletic Stadium; Man of the Match: Carlos Martínez (Goa)

20 August 2023	NorthEast United	3–1	Downtown Heroes	Guwahati
14.30 IST	Melo 48'; Philippoteaux 52'; Gogoi 78'	Report	P. Bhuiya 9'	Stadium: Indira Gandhi Athletic Stadium; Man of the Match: Romain Philippoteaux (NorthEast United)

== Group E ==
Pos	Team	Pld	W	D	L	GF	GA	GD	Pts	Qualification	CHN	HYD	DEL	(Nepal) TRI
1	Chennaiyin	3	3	0	0	8	2	+6	9	Qualify for the knockout stage	—	—	—	3–0
2	Hyderabad	3	1	1	1	5	4	+1	4		1–3	—	—	3–0
3	Delhi	3	0	2	1	3	4	−1	2		1–2	1–1	—	1–1
4	(Nepal) Tribhuvan Army	3	0	1	2	1	7	−6	1		—	—	—	—

Source: Twitter
Rules for classification: Group stage tiebreakers

=== Matches ===
6 August 2023	Delhi	1–1	Hyderabad	Guwahati
14.30 IST	Jangra 6'	Report	Ramhlunchhunga 57'	Stadium: Indira Gandhi Athletic Stadium; Attendance: 1,253; Referee: Crystal John; Man of the Match: Ramhlunchhunga (Hyderabad)

9 August 2023	Delhi	1–1	(Nepal) Tribhuvan Army	Kokrajhar
14.30 IST	Kuntal 88'	Report	D. Henjan 39'	Stadium: SAI Stadium; Referee: Ashwin; Man of the Match: Girik Khosla (Delhi)

10 August 2023	Hyderabad	1–3	Chennaiyin	Guwahati
15.00 IST	Sana 4' (pen.)	Report	Saji 6' (o.g.); Shields 15'; Murray 47'	Stadium: Indira Gandhi Athletic Stadium; Referee: Crystal John; Man of the Match: Connor Shields (Chennaiyin)

14 August 2023	Chennaiyin	3–0	(Nepal) Tribhuvan Army	Guwahati
15.00 IST	Choudhary 23'; R. Ali 40'; Crivellaro 84'	Report		Stadium: Indira Gandhi Athletic Stadium; Man of the Match: Rafael Crivellaro (Chennaiyin)

18 August 2023	Delhi	1–2	Chennaiyin	Guwahati
15.00 IST	Gassama 54'	Report	Crivellaro 38'; Barretto 51'	Stadium: Indira Gandhi Athletic Stadium; Man of the Match: Vanlalhriatzuala K (Delhi)

22 August 2023	Hyderabad	3–0	(Nepal) Tribhuvan Army	Guwahati
15.00 IST	A. D'Silva 16', 24', 69'	Report		Stadium: Indira Gandhi Athletic Stadium; Man of the Match: Aaren D'Silva (Hyderabad)

== Group F ==
Pos	Team	Pld	W	D	L	GF	GA	GD	Pts	Qualification	ARM	RJU	BDO	OFC
1	Indian Army	3	2	1	0	3	1	+2	7	Qualify for the knockout stage	—	—	—	—
2	Rajasthan United	3	1	1	1	2	2	0	4		0–0	—	—	—
3	Bodoland (H)	3	1	0	2	3	4	−1	3		1–2	0–1	—	2–1
4	Odisha	3	1	0	2	3	4	−1	3		0–1	2–1	—	—

Source: Twitter
Rules for classification: Group stage tiebreakers
(H) Hosts

=== Matches ===
5 August 2023	Bodoland	0–1	Rajasthan United	Kokrajhar
14.30 IST		Report	Pauliankhum 47'	Stadium: SAI Stadium; Attendance: 9,246; Referee: Ashwin; Man of the Match: William Pauliankhum (Rajasthan United)

7 August 2023	Odisha	0–1	Indian Army	Kokrajhar
15.00 IST		Report	L. Shil 43' (red card) 77'	Stadium: SAI Stadium; Man of the Match: Bhabindra Malla Thakuri (Indian Army)

11 August 2023	Odisha	2–1	Rajasthan United	Kokrajhar
18.00 IST	C. Murmu 49'; A. Aphaoba Singh 64' (pen.)	Report	R. Denzell 52'	Stadium: SAI Stadium; Man of the Match: Ashangbam Aphaoba Singh (Odisha)

17 August 2023	Bodoland	1–2	Indian Army	Kokrajhar
18.00 IST	J. Aidoo 90+11'	Report	S. Murmu 6'; S. Meitei 90+4' (pen.); B. Thakuri (yellow card) 88' (yellow-red card) 90+11'	Stadium: SAI Stadium; Man of the Match: Suresh Meitei (Indian Army)

19 August 2023	Bodoland	2–1	Odisha	Kokrajhar
16.45 IST	M. Mushahary 80'; Z. Mbenda 90'	Report	P. Lapung 62'	Stadium: SAI Stadium; Man of the Match: Zacharie Mbenda (Bodoland)

21 August 2023	Rajasthan United	0–0	Indian Army	Kokrajhar
18.00 IST		Report		Stadium: SAI Stadium; Man of the Match: Sairuat Kima (Rajasthan United)
