= Asish Rai =

Indian footballer (born 1999)

Personal information
- Full name: Asish Rai
- Date of birth: 27 January 1999 (age 27)
- Place of birth: Pakyong, Sikkim, India
- Height: 1.75 m (5 ft 9 in)
- Position: Right-back

Team information
- Current team: Mohun Bagan
- Number: 44

Youth career
- Pune
- Pune City

Senior career*
Years	Team	Apps	(Gls)
2017–2019	Pune City B	6	(1)
2017–2019	→ Indian Arrows (loan)	29	(1)
2019–2022	Hyderabad	48	(0)
2022–	Mohun Bagan	66	(1)

International career^{‡}
2017–2019	India U20	2	(1)
2019–2021	India U23	4	(0)
2023–	India	6	(0)
- * Club domestic league appearances and goals as of 06:51, 24 September 2023 (UTC) ‡ National team caps and goals as of 10 June 2025 (UTC)

Asish Rai (born 27 January 1999) is an Indian professional footballer who plays as a defender for Indian Super League club Mohun Bagan and the India national team.

== Club career ==
=== Early life and youth career ===
Rai was born in Pakyong, a small village in Sikkim. He always liked to play football, even as a kid. He got interested in the game by his uncle, who played football himself.

He was selected by a local academy in his state at the age of 12. He travelled to Delhi to play in the Subroto Cup, spent a couple of years there before joining the Pune Academy which was later converted into the Pune City Academy. Since, Pune City already had experienced players in the right-back position, they loaned him out to Indian Arrows.

=== Indian Arrows ===
==== 2017–18 season ====
On 29 November 2017, Rai was selected to play for the Indian Arrows, an All India Football Federation owned team that would consist of India under-20 players to give them playing time. He made his professional debut for the side on 26 December 2017, against Shillong Lajong. He started and played the full match as Indian Arrows won 3–0.

In his debut season, Rai made ten appearances, one in the 2018 Indian Super Cup for the Arrows. Although they finished bottom of the table in the I-League, they impressed with their gameplay and football.

==== 2018–19 season ====
On 5 November 2018, he scored his first goal for the club in only his second appearance of the season against Shillong Lajong, which eventually was the winning goal as the Arrows won 1–0. He featured in all 20 matches of the 2018–19 I-League campaign and also a couple in the 2019 Indian Super Cup, as he became a permanent fixture in the right full-back position. The team improved from the season before and picked up 21 points to finish eighth in the points table.

=== Hyderabad ===
==== 2019–20 season ====
Rai went back to the reserves team of Pune City, and when the club was dissolved in the summer of 2019, their replacement club Hyderabad signed him for their first team. He made his professional debut for the club on 25 October 2019, against ATK in a 5–0 loss. On 8 December 2019, Hyderabad head coach Phil Brown heaped praise on Rai after he put in a splendid display in the right-back position, in their narrow 1–0 defeat against Goa.

The debut season of Hyderabad was a devastating one for the club and the fans, most of the Indian players didn't play in their preferred position and one of them was Rai. He played as a left-back, right-back and on the wings, too. He played 14 games for them in the 2019–20 Indian Super League. Due to the unstableness in the squad, tactics and many other factors, he wasn't able to perform up to the mark and couldn't give his best.

On 17 February 2020, Rai signed a three-year extension with the club, till May 2023.

==== 2020–21 season ====
Rai and Hyderabad set the stage alight in the 2020–21 League season, under the stewardship of Manolo Márquez. The second season was a huge improvement for the outfit from the inaugural 2019-20 campaign, where they had finished last in the standings. Despite staying in contention for the playoffs throughout, the Nizams missed out on qualification on the final day due to a string of draws and dropped points.

Rai was in sensational form throughout the season until he picked up a season-ending knee injury against Kerala Blasters, on 16 February 2021. The right-back's industry on the flank and constant threat in the attacking third made him a tough operator for the opposition to contain. He featured in 18 matches of the 2020–21 Indian Super League campaign and also racked up two assists in the process. Head coach Márquez called Rai "the most improved player" of last season.

=== Mohun Bagan ===
Rai moved to another Indian Super League side Mohun Bagan in 2022. He made his debut for the club on 20 August against Rajasthan United at the 131st edition of Durand Cup and they were defeated by 3–2.

== Career statistics ==
=== Club ===
As of 28 October 2025

Club	Season	League			Super Cup		Durand Cup		AFC		Other(s)		Total	
Club	Season	Division	Apps	Goals	Apps	Goals	Apps	Goals	Apps	Goals	Apps	Goals	Apps	Goals
Pune City B	2017–18	I-League 2nd Division	6	0	—								6	0
Pune City B	Pune City Total		6	0	0	0	0	0	0	0	0	0	6	0
Indian Arrows (loan)	2017–18	I-League	9	0	1 (Note: Appearance(s) in Super Cup)	0	—						10	0
Indian Arrows (loan)	2018–19	I-League	20	1	2	0	—						22	1
Indian Arrows (loan)	Indian Arrows total		29	1	3	0	0	0	0	0	0	0	32	1
Hyderabad	2019–20	Indian Super League	14	0	0	0	—						14	0
Hyderabad	2020–21	Indian Super League	18	0	0	0	—						18	0
Hyderabad	2021–22	Indian Super League	16	0	0	0	—						16	0
Hyderabad	Hyderabad total		48	0	0	0	0	0	0	0	0	0	48	0
Mohun Bagan	2022–23	Indian Super League	24	0	2 (Note: 2 Appearance(s) in Super Cup)	0	3 (Note: 3 Appearance(s) in 2022 Durand Cup)	0	1 (Note: Appearance(s) in AFC Cup)	0	0	0	30	0
Mohun Bagan	2023–24	Indian Super League	18	1	3 (Note: 3 Appearance(s) in Super Cup)	0	3 (Note: 3 Appearance(s) in 2023 Durand Cup)	0	7	1	0	0	31	2
Mohun Bagan	2024–25	Indian Super League	24	0	0	0	5 (Note: 5 Appearance(s) in 2024 Durand Cup)	0	1 (Note: Appearances in ACL Two)	0	0	0	30	0
Mohun Bagan	2025–26	Indian Super League	0	0	1	0	3	0	1	0	2 (Note: Appearance(s) in IFA Shield)	0	7	0
Mohun Bagan	Total		66	1	6	0	14	0	10	1	2	0	98	2
Career total			149	2	9	0	14	0	10	1	2	0	184	3

=== International ===
As of 19 June 2025

National team	Year	Apps	Goals
India	2023	1	0
India	2024	3	0
India	2025	2	0
Total		6	0

== Honours ==
Mohun Bagan

- Durand Cup: 2023
- Indian Super League Cup: 2022–23, 2024-25
- Indian Super League Shield: 2023–24, 2024-25
- IFA Shield: 2025, 2026
- Calcutta Football League: 2026

Hyderabad

- Indian Super League Cup: 2021–22
