= Héctor Yuste =

Spanish footballer (born 1988)

Personal information
- Full name: Héctor Yuste Cantón
- Date of birth: 12 January 1988 (age 38)
- Place of birth: Cartagena, Spain
- Height: 1.91 m (6 ft 3 in)
- Positions: Centre-back; defensive midfielder

Youth career
- Fuente Álamo
- Murcia
- 2006–2007: Cartagena

Senior career*
Years	Team	Apps	(Gls)
2007–2010	Cartagena	31	(0)
2007–2008	→ Las Palas (loan)	31	(0)
2010–2011	Salamanca	38	(1)
2011–2015	Granada	6	(0)
2011–2012	→ Cádiz (loan)	32	(3)
2012–2013	→ Racing Santander (loan)	34	(1)
2013–2014	→ Hércules (loan)	39	(0)
2015	→ Mallorca (loan)	17	(0)
2015–2017	Mallorca	77	(1)
2017–2021	Apollon Limassol	91	(10)
2021–2023	Omonia	41	(2)
2023–2024	Mohun Bagan	24	(1)
2024–2025	East Bengal	18	(0)
Total		479	(19)
- * Club domestic league appearances and goals

Héctor Yuste Cantón (born 12 January 1988) is a Spanish former professional footballer who played as a centre-back or a defensive midfielder.

== Club career ==
=== Spain ===
Born in Cartagena, Yuste started out at local clubs Fuente Álamo and Real Murcia CF. He finished his youth career with neighbours FC Cartagena.

Yuste returned to Cartagena after one year at loan at amateurs AD Las Palas, helping them return to Segunda División in 2008–09 and finishing the season in the starting XI after a coaching move. The following campaign, as the Region of Murcia side nearly promoted again, he contributed 18 games.

From 2010–11 to 2013–14, Yuste was relegated three times from the second division, successively with UD Salamanca, Racing de Santander and Hércules CF. For the 2014–15 season he returned to Granada CF who had loaned him to the latter two teams, making his La Liga debut on 23 August 2014 by playing the first half of a 2–1 home win against Deportivo de La Coruña (0–1 at half-time).

Yuste returned to the second tier late into the 2015 January transfer window, being loaned to RCD Mallorca; in the summer, the move was made permanent. He scored his first goal for the Balearic Islands club on 27 March 2016, helping to a 1–1 draw at UD Almería.

=== Abroad ===
Following Mallorca's relegation in 2017, Yuste signed with Apollon Limassol FC in the Cypriot First Division, where he shared teams with his compatriot Adrián Sardinero. After leaving, he spent two seasons at AC Omonia in the same country, winning the Cypriot Cup twice and the 2021 Cypriot Super Cup; he also played in the UEFA Europa League and UEFA Europa Conference League group stages.

Before retiring in 2025 aged 37, Yuste competed in the Indian Super League with Mohun Bagan Super Giant and East Bengal FC.

== Honours ==
Omonia

- Cypriot Cup: 2021–22, 2022–23
- Cypriot Super Cup: 2021

Mohun Bagan

- Indian Super League Shield: 2023–24
- Durand Cup: 2023
