= Ashraful Islam Rana =

Bangladeshi footballer (born 1988)

Ashraful Rana
Personal information
- Full name: Mohamed Ashraful Islam Rana
- Date of birth: 1 May 1988 (age 38)
- Place of birth: Manikganj, Bangladesh
- Height: 1.80 m (5 ft 11 in)
- Position: Goalkeeper

Senior career*
Years	Team	Apps	(Gls)
2003–2023	Bangladesh Army	0	(0)
2015–2016	Mohammedan SC		(0)
2016–2018	Chittagong Abahani	42	(0)
2018	→ Saif SC (loan)	0	(0)
2018–2023	Sheikh Russel KC	86	(0)
2023–2024	Chittagong Abahani	16	(0)
2024–2025	Brothers Union	8	(0)

International career
2018	Bangladesh U23 (wildcard)	4	(0)
2015–2022	Bangladesh	25	(0)

Managerial career
- 2025–: Brothers Union (goalkeeping coach)
- 2026–: Bangladesh (goalkeeping coach)
- * Club domestic league appearances and goals

Ashraful Islam Rana (Bengali: আশরাফুল ইসলাম রানা; born 1 May 1988), commonly known as Ashraful Rana, is a retired Bangladeshi professional footballer who played as a goalkeeper. He last played for Bangladesh Premier League club Brothers Union and also represented the Bangladesh national team from 2015 to 2022.

== Club career ==
=== Early career ===
Rana joined the Bangladesh Army in 2003 and played numerous local tournaments for the Bangladesh Army football team over the next decade and more.

=== Mohammedan SC ===
He started his professional league career with Mohammedan SC in 2015, after leaving his job in the Army. Having made his league debut at the age of 27, Rana became a regular face with both the club and country within a year.

=== Chittagong Abahani ===
In 2016 he moved to Chittagong Abahani where he won the 2016 Independence Cup.

=== Sheikh Russel KC ===
In September 2018, Ashraful Rana joined Sheikh Russel KC for 2018–19 season. As of unofficial sources, his salary that season was 5.5 million taka. He was also named captain of the team. Under his captaincy, Sheikh Russel became runners-up in the 2018-19 Independence Cup. It was Russel's first final after five years. Rana kept 4 clean sheets in 5 matches of the tournament. He kept 18 clean sheets in the 2018–19 season. Rana remained the club's captain for the 2021–22 season.

In 2023, Rana returned to the Bangladesh Army football team as a guest player to participate in the 2023 Durand Cup.

== International career ==
Rana made his debut for national side in an International friendly against Nepal on 19 December 2015 at Bangabandhu National Stadium. He made ten saves against UAE during an International friendly match which Bangladesh lost 1–6, on 18 March 2016. He played full 90 minutes when Bangladesh got trashed 0–8 by Jordan during the 2018 FIFA World Cup qualification – AFC second round. On 4 September 2016, Bangladesh Football Federation announced his name as the new captain of the national team. On 6 September 2016, he played his first and only match as Bangladesh captain in a goalless draw against Bhutan in the 2019 AFC Asian Cup qualification – play-off round. His penalty save in the second leg could not prevent Bangladesh from crashing out of the play-offs with an aggregate scoreline of 1–3 in the favour of Bhutan.

== Career statistics ==
=== International ===
Appearances and goals by national team and year
National team	Year	Apps	Goals
Bangladesh	2015	1	0
Bangladesh	2016	7	0
Bangladesh	2018	4	0
Bangladesh	2019	8	0
Bangladesh	2020	4	0
Bangladesh	2021	1	0
Total		25	0
