= 2023 Durand Cup =

132nd edition of the Durand Cup

IndianOil Durand Cup
- Logo of the 132nd Durand Cup, 2023

Tournament details
- Country: India
- Venue(s): Kolkata, Guwahati and Kokrajhar
- Dates: 3 August – 3 September
- Teams: 24

Final positions
- Champions: Mohun Bagan (17th title)
- Runners-up: East Bengal

Tournament statistics
- Matches played: 43
- Goals scored: 131 (3.05 per match)
- Top goal scorer(s): David Lalhlansanga; Noah Sadaoui (6 goals each)

The 2023 Durand Cup (also known as IndianOil Durand Cup due to sponsorship ties with the Indian Oil Corporation) was the 132nd edition of Durand Cup, the oldest football tournament in Asia, and the second edition since it was supported by the Asian Football Confederation. The tournament is hosted by the Durand Football Tournament Society in co-operation with the AIFF, Eastern Command of the Indian Armed Forces and the Government of West Bengal, supported by the Government of Assam.

This year for the second time the tournament will be played in more than one city. This will be the second season of the tournament wherein all 12 clubs in the top tier Indian Super League have been mandated to participate, along with invited clubs from I-League, I-League 2 and regional league, and teams representing armed forces.

Bengaluru FC were the defending champions, having defeated Mumbai City FC in the 2022 final. The 2023 IndianOil Durand Cup final saw the Kolkata club Mohun Bagan win their 17th Durand Cup title by defeating their arch-rivals East Bengal by 1–0.

== Teams ==
The organization committee announced an increase in the number of teams from the previous edition. 19 Indian clubs and 5 services teams, from India, Nepal, and Bangladesh will play in this edition. This is the first time in 27 years a foreign team participates in the tournament.

The teams have been drawn into six groups of four each. Six group winners and the two best second-placed sides will make the knockout stage.

Locations of the participating teams in the Durand Cup

Team	Head coach	Captain	Location
Indian Super League teams
Bengaluru	(India) Bibiano Fernandes	(India) Parag Shrivas	Bengaluru, Karnataka
East Bengal	(Spain) Carles Cuadrat	(India) Harmanjot Singh Khabra	Kolkata, West Bengal
Chennaiyin	(Scotland) Owen Coyle	(Australia) Jordan Murray	Chennai, Tamil Nadu
Goa	(Spain) Manolo Márquez	(India) Brandon Fernandes	Margao, Goa
Hyderabad	(India) Thangboi Singto	(India) Chinglensana Singh	Hyderabad, Telangana
Jamshedpur	(India) Steven Dias	(India) Sk Sahil	Jamshedpur, Jharkhand
Kerala Blasters	(Belgium) Frank Dauwen	(Uruguay) Adrián Luna	Kochi, Kerala
Mohun Bagan	(Spain) Juan Ferrando	(India) Subhasish Bose	Kolkata, West Bengal
Mumbai City	(England) Des Buckingham	(India) Rahul Bheke	Mumbai, Maharashtra
NorthEast United	(Spain) Juan Pedro Benali	(India) Gaurav Bora	Guwahati, Assam
Odisha	(India) Amit Rana	(India) Rakesh Oram	Bhubaneswar, Odisha
Punjab	(Greece) Staikos Vergetis	(Slovenia) Luka Majcen	Ludhiana, Punjab
I-League teams
Delhi	(India) Anish Krishna Shetty	(India) Bali Gagandeep	New Delhi, Delhi
Gokulam Kerala	(Spain) Domingo Oramas	(Spain) Álex Sánchez	Kozhikode, Kerala
Mohammedan	(India) Mehrajuddin Wadoo	(India) Samad Ali Mallick	Kolkata, West Bengal
Rajasthan United	(India) Pushpender Kundu	(India) Hardik Bhatt	Jaipur, Rajasthan
Shillong Lajong	(India) Bobby Nongbet	(India) Hardy Nongbri	Shillong, Meghalaya
State leagues team
Downtown Heroes	(India) Hilal Rasool Parray	(India) Shahid Nazir	Srinagar, Jammu & Kashmir
Bodoland	(India) Daimalu Basumatary	(India) Didwm Hazowary	Kokrajhar, Assam
Indian Armed Forces teams
Indian Air Force	(India) Priya Darshan	(India) Mandeep S Singh	New Delhi, Delhi
Indian Army	(India) L Antony Ramesh	(India) Bhabindra Malla Thakuri	New Delhi, Delhi
Indian Navy	(India) Abhilash Vasantha	(India) VK Vishnu	New Delhi, Delhi
Foreign armed forces teams
Bangladesh Army	(Bangladesh) Abdur Razzaque	(Bangladesh) Md. Samimul Haque	Dhaka, Bangladesh
Tribhuvan Army	(Nepal) Megh Raj KC	(Nepal) Bharat Khawas	Kathmandu, Nepal

== Venues ==
Initially, Imphal was drafted as a host city. However, due to the 2023 Manipur unrest, Guwahati was set as the replacement. A total of 43 matches are being played across 3 cities — Kolkata, Guwahati and Kokrajhar. 23 matches will be played in Kolkata, including the final, 11 matches in Guwahati, and 9 matches in Kokrajhar.

Kolkata		Guwahati
Vivekananda Yuba Bharati Krirangan	Kishore Bharati Krirangan	Indira Gandhi Athletic Stadium
Capacity: 68,000	Capacity: 12,000	Capacity: 30,000
Kolkata		Kokrajhar
Mohun Bagan Ground	East Bengal Ground	SAI Stadium
Capacity: 22,000	Capacity: 23,500	Capacity: 10,000

== Trophy tour ==
Like the preceding season, the Durand Football Tournament Society (DFTS) organized a trophy tour across 15 cities before the beginning of the tournament but with much more grandiosity. The tour was flagged off on 30 June from Manekshaw Centre in Delhi Cantonment in the presence of Gen. Manoj Pande, ACM VR Chaudhari and the AIFF President Kalyan Chaubey and toured upon Kartavya Path from India Gate to Rashtrapati Bhavan, later reaching Indian Military Academy in Dehradun on 2 July. The tour continued to Udhampur on 4 July, then to Pune on 6 July, where a grand reception was organized by the officers and cadets at National Defence Academy.

The trophies were received by the Army Officers Institute in Mumbai on 8 July and was publicly showcased at the Gateway of India and the Marine Drive. The tour continued to Jaipur on 9 July, where public showcasing was done at Amber Fort, Hawa Mahal, Jal Mahal, Albert Hall Museum and Jaipur Vidhan Sabha. The trophies were then unveiled at Indian Naval Academy in Ezhimala on 13 July. The tour in Kerala continued with the trophies being sailed on INS Vikrant at Southern Naval Command, Kochi in the presence of Rear Admiral Susheel Menon and IM Viajayan on 15 July. The trophies reached one of the host cities—Guwahati on 16 July. They were received by the Sports Minister of Assam Nandita Gorlosa and Lt. Gen. Rana Pratap Kalita.

The tour continued to Bangalore on 18 July, following to Shillong on 19 July, where the trophies were sailed across Umiam Lake and Orchid Lake and then brought to Kibithu as a part of tribute offering to India's first Chief of Defence Staff—Gen. Bipin Rawat at General Bipin Rawat Garrison. The trophies traveled to Hyderabad, visiting the Air Force Academy on 20 July and then on 22 July, the trophies reached another host city—Kokrajhar in the presence of Chaubey, the CEM of the BTC Pramod Boro and Maj. Gen. Dinesh Hooda. The trophy tour was flagged in on 25 July in Kolkata which was commemorated by first ever BASE jump in the city taking place from the top of The 42, led by Lt. Col. Satyandra Verma and Gp. Capt. Kamal Singh Oberh.

== Official song ==
On 10 August 2023, Durand Cup Official theme song and a music video featuring Vicky Kaushal were released. The song was titled "Bhide" in Hindi which was sung by Arijit Singh, and Divine, composed by Arijit Singh and written by Amitabh Bhattacharya & Divine.

== Broadcasting ==
Sony Sports Network have acquired the broadcasting rights of Durand Cup for three editions, starting from 2023. The 2023 edition will be live streamed on the network's OTT platform SonyLIV as well as TV channels Sony Ten 2 and Sony Ten 2 HD.

== Group stage ==
=== Group A ===
Pos	Team	Pld	W	D	L	GF	GA	GD	Pts	Qualification	EAB	MBG	(Bangladesh) BAN	PUN
1	East Bengal (H)	3	2	1	0	4	2	+2	7	Qualify for the knockout stage	—	—	2–2	1–0
2	Mohun Bagan (H)	3	2	0	1	7	1	+6	6	Qualify for the knockout stage	0–1	—	5–0	2–0
3	Bangladesh Army	3	0	2	1	2	7	−5	2		—	—	—	—
4	Punjab	3	0	1	2	0	3	−3	1		—	—	0–0	—

Source: Twitter
Rules for classification: Group stage tiebreakers
(H) Hosts

=== Group B ===
Pos	Team	Pld	W	D	L	GF	GA	GD	Pts	Qualification	MCI	MSC	JAM	INV
1	Mumbai City	3	3	0	0	12	1	+11	9	Qualify for the knockout stage	—	—	5–0	4–0
2	Mohammedan (H)	3	2	0	1	9	4	+5	6		1–3	—	6–0	2–1
3	Jamshedpur	3	1	0	2	1	11	−10	3		—	—	—	1–0
4	Indian Navy	3	0	0	3	1	7	−6	0		—	—	—	—

Source: Twitter
Rules for classification: Group stage tiebreakers
(H) Hosts

=== Group C ===
Pos	Team	Pld	W	D	L	GF	GA	GD	Pts	Qualification	GOK	BEN	KER	IAF
1	Gokulam Kerala	3	2	0	1	6	5	+1	6	Qualify for the knockout stage	—	—	—	2–0
2	Bengaluru	3	1	2	0	5	3	+2	5		2–0	—	2–2	1–1
3	Kerala Blasters	3	1	1	1	10	6	+4	4		3–4	—	—	5–0
4	Indian Air Force	3	0	1	2	1	8	−7	1		—	—	—	—

Source: Twitter
Rules for classification: Group stage tiebreakers

=== Group D ===
Pos	Team	Pld	W	D	L	GF	GA	GD	Pts	Qualification	GOA	NEU	SHI	DTH
1	Goa	3	2	1	0	11	2	+9	7	Qualify for the knockout stage	—	—	6–0	3–0
2	NorthEast United (H)	3	2	1	0	9	3	+6	7	Qualify for the knockout stage	2–2	—	4–0	3–1
3	Shillong Lajong	3	1	0	2	2	11	−9	3		—	—	—	—
4	Downtown Heroes	3	0	0	3	2	8	−6	0		—	—	1–2	—

Source: Twitter
Rules for classification: Group stage tiebreakers
(H) Hosts

=== Group E ===
Pos	Team	Pld	W	D	L	GF	GA	GD	Pts	Qualification	CHN	HYD	DEL	(Nepal) TRI
1	Chennaiyin	3	3	0	0	8	2	+6	9	Qualify for the knockout stage	—	—	—	3–0
2	Hyderabad	3	1	1	1	5	4	+1	4		1–3	—	—	3–0
3	Delhi	3	0	2	1	3	4	−1	2		1–2	1–1	—	1–1
4	(Nepal) Tribhuvan Army	3	0	1	2	1	7	−6	1		—	—	—	—

Source: Twitter
Rules for classification: Group stage tiebreakers

=== Group F ===
Pos	Team	Pld	W	D	L	GF	GA	GD	Pts	Qualification	ARM	RJU	BDO	OFC
1	Indian Army	3	2	1	0	3	1	+2	7	Qualify for the knockout stage	—	—	—	—
2	Rajasthan United	3	1	1	1	2	2	0	4		0–0	—	—	—
3	Bodoland (H)	3	1	0	2	3	4	−1	3		1–2	0–1	—	2–1
4	Odisha	3	1	0	2	3	4	−1	3		0–1	2–1	—	—

Source: Twitter
Rules for classification: Group stage tiebreakers
(H) Hosts

=== Ranking of second-placed teams ===
Pos	Grp	Team	Pld	W	D	L	GF	GA	GD	Pts	Qualification
1	D	NorthEast United	3	2	1	0	9	3	+6	7	Advance to Knockout stage
2	A	Mohun Bagan	3	2	0	1	7	1	+6	6	Advance to Knockout stage
3	B	Mohammedan	3	2	0	1	9	4	+5	6	
4	C	Bengaluru	3	1	2	0	5	3	+2	5	
5	E	Hyderabad	3	1	1	1	5	4	+1	4	
6	F	Rajasthan United	3	1	1	1	2	2	0	4	

Updated to match(es) played on unknown. Source:

== Knockout stage ==
=== Qualified teams ===
Group	Winners
A	East Bengal
B	Mumbai City
C	Gokulam Kerala
D	Goa
E	Chennaiyin
F	Indian Army

Group	Best second-placed teams
D	NorthEast United
A	Mohun Bagan

In the knockout stage matches (quarter-finals, semi-finals, and final), no extra time would be played and for any draws, matches would be directly decided by a penalty shootout.

=== Bracket ===
Quarter-finals
24 August – Guwahati
Indian Army	0
NorthEast United	1
25 August – Kolkata
East Bengal	2
Gokulam Kerala	1
26 August – Guwahati
Goa	4
Chennaiyin	1
27 August – Kolkata
Mumbai City	1
Mohun Bagan	3

Semi-finals
29 August – Kolkata
NorthEast United	2(3)
East Bengal	2(5)
31 August – Kolkata
Goa	1
Mohun Bagan	2

Final
3 September – Kolkata
East Bengal	0
Mohun Bagan	1

=== Quarter-finals ===
24 August 2023
18:00 IST

Indian Army	0–1	NorthEast United
	Report	Phalguni Singh 51'

Indira Gandhi Athletic Stadium, Guwahati

25 August 2023
18:00 IST

East Bengal	2–1	Gokulam Kerala
Jordan Elsey 1'; Aminou Bouba 80' (o.g.)	Report	Aminou Bouba 57'

Vivekananda Yuba Bharati Krirangan, Kolkata

26 August 2023
18:00 IST

Goa	4–1	Chennaiyin
Carl McHugh 29'; Carlos Martínez 37'; Noah Sadaoui 90+2'; Víctor Rodríguez 90+4'	Report	Bikash Yumnam 5'

Indira Gandhi Athletic Stadium, Guwahati

27 August 2023
18:00 IST

Mumbai City	1–3	Mohun Bagan
Jorge Pereyra Díaz 28'	Report	Jason Cummings 9' (pen.); Manvir Singh 30'; Anwar Ali 63'

Vivekananda Yuba Bharati Krirangan, Kolkata
Attendance: 19,735

=== Semi-finals ===
29 August 2023
18:00 IST

NorthEast United	2–2	East Bengal
Míchel Zabaco 22'; Phalguni Singh 57'	Report	Naorem Mahesh Singh 77'; Nandhakumar Sekar 90+7'
Penalties
	3–5

Vivekananda Yuba Bharati Krirangan, Kolkata
Attendance: 21,567

31 August 2023
18:00 IST

Goa	1–2	Mohun Bagan
Noah Sadaoui 23'	Report	Jason Cummings 42' (pen.); Armando Sadiku 61'

Vivekananda Yuba Bharati Krirangan, Kolkata

=== Final ===
3 September 2023
16:00 IST

East Bengal	0–1	Mohun Bagan
	Report	Dimitri Petratos 71'

Vivekananda Yuba Bharati Krirangan, Kolkata
Attendance: 55,423
Referee: Rahul Kumar Gupta

== Statistics ==
As of 3 September 2023

=== Top scorers ===
Key
‡	Golden Boot Winner

Rank	Player	Club	Goals
1	(India) David Lalhlansanga ^{‡}	Mohammedan	6
1	(Morocco) Noah Sadaoui	Goa	6
3	(Argentina) Jorge Pereyra Díaz	Mumbai City	5
4	(India) Parthib Gogoi	NorthEast United	4
5	(India) Lalremsanga Fanai	Mohammedan	3
5	(India) Bidyashagar Singh	Kerala Blasters	3
5	(India) Aaren D'Silva	Hyderabad	3
5	(Spain) Carlos Martínez	Goa	3
9	(India) Rowllin Borges	Goa	2
9	(India) Sreekuttan VS	Gokulam Kerala	2
9	(India) Ronney Kharbudon	Shillong Lajong	2
9	(Spain) Javier Siverio	East Bengal	2
9	(Cameroon) Aminou Bouba	Gokulam Kerala	2
9	(Brazil) Rafael Crivellaro	Chennaiyin	2
9	(France) Romain Philippoteaux	NorthEast United	2
9	(Spain) Victor Rodriguez	Goa	2
9	(Nigeria) Justine Emmanuel	Kerala Blasters	2
9	(India) Mohammed Aimen	Kerala Blasters	2
9	(Australia) Jason Cummings	Mohun Bagan	2
9	(India) Nandha Kumar Sekar	East Bengal	2
9	(India) Phalguni Singh	NorthEast United	2
9	(India) Manvir Singh	Mohun Bagan	2

=== Hat-tricks ===
Player	For	Against	Result	Date	Ref
(India) Parthib Gogoi	NorthEast United	Shillong Lajong	4–0	4 August 2023	
(Morocco) Noah Sadaoui	Goa	Shillong Lajong	6–0	8 August 2023	
(India) David Lalhlansanga^{4}	Mohammedan	Jamshedpur	6–0	20 August 2023	
(India) Bidyashagar Singh	Kerala Blasters	Indian Air Force	5–0	21 August 2023	
(India) Aaren D'Silva	Hyderabad	(Nepal) Tribhuvan Army	3–0	22 August 2023	

Notes

^{4} Player scored 4 goals

=== Clean sheets ===
Key
†	Golden Glove Winner

Rank	Player	Club	Clean sheets
1	(India) Vishal Kaith ^{†}	Mohun Bagan	2
1	(India) Sayad Bin Abdul Kadir	Indian Army	2
1	(India) Bhabindra Malla Thakuri	Indian Army	2
1	(India) Prabhsukhan Singh Gill	East Bengal	2
1	(India) Phurba Lachenpa	Mumbai City	2
1	(India) Sachin Jha	Rajasthan United	2
1	(India) Mirshad Michu	NorthEast United	2
8	(India) Arsh Anwer Shaikh	Mohun Bagan	1
8	(India) Arshdeep Singh	Goa	1
8	(India) Zothanmawia	Gokulam Kerala	1
8	(India) Ravi Kumar	Punjab	1
8	(Bangladesh) Ashraful Islam Rana	Bangladesh Army	1
8	(India) Debjit Majumder	Chennaiyin	1
8	(India) Hrithik Tiwari	Goa	1
8	(India) Lalbiakhlua Jongte	Mohammedan	1
8	(India) Sachin Suresh	Kerala Blasters	1
8	(India) Sahil Poonia	Bengaluru	1
8	(India) Gurmeet Singh	Hyderabad	1
8	(India) Ayush Jena	Jamshedpur	1
8	(India) Mohammad Nawaz	Mumbai City	1
8	(Bangladesh) Md Alamgir Hossen	Bangladesh Army	1
8	(India) Ngamsanglena Haokip	Shilong Lajong	1
8	(India) Niraj Kumar	Odisha	1
8	(India) Mohit Singh Dhami	Jamshedpur	1

=== Discipline ===
==== Player ====
- Most yellow cards: 2
  - (Bangladesh) Md. Mizanur Rahman
- Most red cards: 1
  - (Bangladesh) Md. Mizanur Rahaman
  - (India) Nishu Kumar
  - (India) Liton Shil
  - (India) Dettol Moirangthem
  - (India) Ngamsanglena Haokip
  - (India) Bhabindra Malla Thakuri
  - (India) Hormipam Ruivah
  - (India) Anirudh Thapa

==== Club ====
- Most yellow cards: 3
  - Bangladesh Army
- Most red cards: 2
  - (India) Indian Army

== Awards ==
=== Prize money ===
The total pool of prize money for the 2023 edition is ₹1 crore (US$100,000).

Prize	Recipient	Amount
Champions	Mohun Bagan	₹60 lakh (US$62,000)
Runner-up	East Bengal	₹30 lakh (US$31,000)
Golden glove	Vishal Kaith	₹3 lakh (US$3,100)
Golden boot	David Lalhlansanga	₹3 lakh (US$3,100)
Golden ball	Nandhakumar Sekar	₹4 lakh (US$4,200)

=== Man of the Match awards ===
Match	Man of the Match		Match	Man of the Match		Match	Man of the Match	
Match	Player	Club	Match	Player	Club	Match	Player	Club
Match 1	(India) Liston Colaco	Mohun Bagan	Match 16	(India) Ashangbam Aphaoba Singh	Odisha	Match 31	(France) Romain Philippoteaux	NorthEast United
Match 2	(India) Parthib Gogoi	NorthEast United	Match 17	(India) Seriton Fernandes	Goa	Match 32	(India) David Lalhlansanga	Mohammedan
Match 3	(India) William Pauliankhum	Rajasthan United	Match 18	(India) Nandhakumar Sekar	East Bengal	Match 33	(India) Bidyashagar Singh	Kerala Blasters
Match 4	(Spain) Alberto Noguera	Mumbai City	Match 19	(Spain) Nili Perdomo	Gokulam Kerala	Match 34	(India) Sairuat Kima	Rajasthan United
Match 5	(India) Ramhlunchhunga	Hyderabad	Match 20	(India) Ronney Kharbudon	Shillong Lajong	Match 35	(India) Aaren D'Silva	Hyderabad
Match 6	(India) Harmanjot Singh Khabra	East Bengal	Match 21	(Brazil) Rafael Crivellaro	Chennaiyin	Match 36	(India) Robin Yadav	Bengaluru
Match 7	(India) Bhabindra Malla Thakuri	Indian Army	Match 22	(India) Vivek Kumar	Indian Air Force	Match 37		
Match 8	(France) Hugo Boumous	Mohun Bagan	Match 23	(Spain) Carlos Martínez	Goa	Match 38		
Match 9	(Morocco) Noah Sadaoui	Goa	Match 24	(India) Nandhakumar Sekar	East Bengal	Match 39		
Match 10	(India) Lalengmawia Ralte	Mumbai City	Match 25	(India) Ashley Alban Koli	Jamshedpur	Match 40		
Match 11	(India) Girik Khosla	Delhi	Match 26	(India) Suresh Meitei	Indian Army	Match 41		
Match 12	(India) Shibinraj Kunniyil	Indian Air Force	Match 27	(India) Vanlalhriatzuala K	Delhi	Match 42		
Match 13	(Scotland) Connor Shields	Chennaiyin	Match 28	(India) Bekey Oram	Bengaluru	Match 43		
Match 14	(Bangladesh) Ashraful Islam Rana	Bangladesh Army	Match 29	(India) Bipin Singh	Mumbai City			
Match 15	(Argentina) Alexis Gómez	Mohammedan	Match 30	(Cameroon) Zacharie Mbenda	Bodoland			

== See also ==
- Men
  - 2023–24 Indian Super League (Tier I)
  - 2023–24 I-League (Tier II)
  - 2023–24 I-League 2 (Tier III)
  - 2023–24 I-League 3 (Tier IV)
  - 2023–24 Indian State Leagues (Tier V)
  - 2024 Super Cup
  - 2024 Reliance Foundation Development League
- Women
  - 2023–24 Indian Women's League
  - 2023–24 Indian Women's League 2
