= Manolo Márquez =

Spanish footballer & coach (born 1968)

Personal information
- Full name: Manuel Manolo Márquez Roca
- Date of birth: 7 September 1968 (age 58)
- Place of birth: Barcelona, Spain
- Position: Defender

Youth career
- 1978–1987: Las Palmas

Senior career*
Years	Team	Apps	(Gls)
1987–1988	Prat	38	(6)
1988–1987	Santfeliuenc	34	(4)
1987–1991	Montañesa	118	(12)
1991–1992	Sant Andreu	32	(4)
1992–1995	Martinenc	94	(8)
1995–1996	Horta	36	(6)
1996–1997	Badalona	34	(4)
1997–1999	Sant Andreu	62	(6)

Managerial career
- 2002–2003: Martinenc
- 2003–2006: Prat
- 2006–2007: Europa
- 2007–2009: Prat
- 2010–2012: Badalona
- 2013–2014: Espanyol B
- 2014–2015: Prat
- 2015–2016: Sant Andreu
- 2016–2017: Las Palmas B
- 2017–2018: Las Palmas
- 2018–2019: Istra 1961
- 2019–2020: Ratchaburi Mitr Phol
- 2020–2023: Hyderabad
- 2023–2026: Goa
- 2024–2025: India
- 2026: Mumbai City
- * Club domestic league appearances and goals

Manuel "Manolo" Márquez Roca (born 7 September 1968) is a Spanish professional football manager and former player.

== Playing career ==
Born in Barcelona, Catalonia, Márquez represented Cerdanyola, Santfeliuenc, Montañesa, Granollers, Martinenc, Horta, Badalona and Penya Barcelonista Anguera as a player, retiring professionally at the age of 28.

== Managerial career ==
Márquez started his career with his last club Anguera in 2002, as manager. After two spells at Prat and one season at Tercera División side Europa, he was appointed manager of Segunda División B club Badalona on 5 June 2010.

Márquez took Badalona to the play-offs during his two seasons in charge, missing out promotion in both, however. On 31 January 2013, he was appointed in charge of Espanyol B.

Márquez was sacked by the Pericos on 21 January 2014, being replaced by his assistant Sergio. On 4 November, he returned to Prat for a third stint, but was relieved from his duties at the end of the season after failing to achieve promotion.

On 29 June 2015, Márquez was named at the helm of Sant Andreu, also in the fourth division. He was dismissed on 26 October, and only returned to coaching duties the following 16 June, after being named as manager of Las Palmas B.

Márquez achieved promotion to the third tier as champions with the B-team, and on 3 July 2017 he was appointed manager of the main squad in La Liga, after agreeing to a one-year contract. His first match in charge occurred on 18 August 2017, a 0–1 away loss against Valencia.

On 26 September 2017, after just six league matches in charge, Márquez resigned as manager after overseeing a 0–2 home defeat against Leganés just two days earlier.

In June 2018, Márquez signed with Croatian side Istra 1961 for one campaign. However, he was sacked on 18 September after winning only one of the first seven games.

At the end of 2018, Márquez agreed to manage Ratchaburi Mitr Phol in the Thai Premier League. He left a month later for personal reasons, before taking charge of a single game.

In March 2020, Márquez tested positive for COVID-19. He recovered 12 days later.

On 31 August 2020, Márquez was appointed as the head coach of Indian Super League club Hyderabad. On 10 February 2021, he penned down a two-year contract extension, that tied him with the club till 2023. The announcement came after he had led the team in the 2020–21 season to a fifth-place finish on the league table, failing to qualify for the playoff by two points. Márquez led Hyderabad to their first ever ISL title in the 2021–22 season. The club qualified for the playoffs again in the 2022–23 season but lost to Mohun Bagan in the semi-final. On 28 March 2023, Hyderabad announced that Márquez would leave them at the end of the season.

On 2 June 2023, Márquez was appointed as the head coach of Goa on a multi-year deal.

On 20 July 2024, Márquez was appointed as the head coach of Indian Football Team succeeding the post of Igor Stimac, who was replaced by the AIFF. As per his contract, Marquez would see out his Goa role by continuing as the head coach of the club concurrently with the national team job, before assuming the national team role on a full-time basis after the conclusion of the 2024–25 season.

Alongside Marquez, Benito Montalvo was appointed as assistant coach, and Jose Carlos Barroso was appointed as the strength and conditioning coach. Both were also at Goa, and similar to Marquez, would do both jobs until the end of the season, before solely working for the national team.

Marquez's first match with the national team was a 0-0 draw against Mauritius, which Marquez himself described as "a boring game". After a 3-0 loss to Syria, the first goal of Marquez's tenure as Indian head coach came against Vietnam, with attacker Farukh Choudhary scoring a chip over Vietnam goalkeeper Filip Nguyen. This was the equalizing goal, as India went on to draw the game 1-1.

Marquez's first win with the Indian national team came on 19 March 2025, with a 3-0 win against Maldives, after goals from Rahul Bheke, Liston Colaco, and Sunil Chhetri. This win ended the nation's 489-day winless streak.

On 2 July 2025, following an AIFF Technical Committee meeting, a mutual termination of Márquez's contract was announced. It was later announced that Márquez would return to his earlier role of Goa head coach for the 2025-26 season.

== Managerial statistics ==
As of match played 1 November 2026

Managerial record by team and tenure
Team	From	To	Record								Ref
Team	From	To	G	W	D	L	GF	GA	GD	Win %	Ref
Anguera	1 July 2002	30 June 2003	34	17	6	11	66	42	+24	50.00	
Prat	1 July 2003	30 June 2006	114	51	31	32	162	104	+58	44.74	
Europa	1 July 2006	30 June 2007	38	12	8	18	51	48	+3	31.58	
Prat	1 July 2007	30 June 2009	76	35	23	18	99	71	+28	46.05	
Badalona	5 June 2010	20 June 2012	87	39	27	21	99	66	+33	44.83	
Espanyol B	30 January 2013	21 January 2014	38	14	10	14	42	40	+2	36.84	
Prat	4 November 2014	21 May 2015	27	14	10	3	39	19	+20	51.85	
Sant Andreu	29 June 2015	26 October 2015	10	2	3	5	8	16	−8	20.00	
Las Palmas B	16 June 2016	3 July 2017	40	31	7	2	97	21	+76	77.50	
Las Palmas	3 July 2017	26 September 2017	6	2	0	4	5	10	−5	33.33	
Istra 1961	15 June 2018	18 September 2018	7	1	2	4	7	15	−8	14.29	
Ratchaburi Mitr Phol	27 December 2018	22 January 2019	0	0	0	0	0	0	+0	—	
Hyderabad	31 August 2020	31 May 2023	75	36	24	15	128	71	+57	48.00	
Goa	2 June 2023	18 June 2026	87	48	17	22	152	100	+52	55.17	
India	20 July 2024	2 July 2025	8	1	4	3	5	8	−3	12.50	
Mumbai City	18 July 2026	6 November 2026	4	0	2	2	4	6	−2	0.00	
Total			647	303	172	172	960	631	+329	46.83	

== Honours ==
Hyderabad

- Indian Super League: 2021–22

Goa

- Super Cup: 2025

Individual

- ESPN India's Coach of the Year: 2022
