= Noah Sadaoui =

Moroccan footballer (born 1993)

Personal information
- Full name: Noah Wail Jacob Sadaoui
- Date of birth: 14 September 1993 (age 33)
- Place of birth: Casablanca, Morocco
- Height: 1.80 m (5 ft 11 in)
- Position: Winger

Team information
- Current team: Dewa United Banten
- Number: 77

Youth career
- 1998–2004: Wydad AC
- 2005–2007: New York Red Bulls
- 2007–2011: Saint Benedict's
- 2011–2014: Saint Peter's

Senior career*
Years	Team	Apps	(Gls)
2013–2014	Maccabi Haifa	0	(0)
2013	→ Hapoel Kfar Saba (loan)	7	(0)
2013–2014	→ Nazareth Illit (loan)	11	(0)
2014–2015	Ajax Cape Town	2	(1)
2016	Miami United		
2016	Real España	0	(0)
2016–2017	Al-Khaburah		
2017–2018	Mirbat		
2018–2019	ENPPI	15	(2)
2019–2020	MC Oujda	44	(13)
2020–2021	Raja CA	18	(2)
2021–2022	AS FAR	15	(1)
2022–2024	Goa	43	(20)
2024–2026	Kerala Blasters	19	(7)
2026	→ Dewa United Banten (loan)	13	(1)
2026–	Dewa United Banten	4	(1)

International career^{‡}
2021	Morocco	4	(0)
Medal record
Men's football
Representing Morocco
African Nations Championship
Winner	2020 Cameroon
- * Club domestic league appearances and goals as of 31 October 2026 ‡ National team caps and goals as of 7 February 2021

Noah Wail Jacob Sadaoui (born 14 September 1993) is a Moroccan professional footballer who plays as a winger for Super League club Dewa United Banten.

== Club career ==
=== Early life and career ===
Sadaoui was born in Morocco where he started his career in the youth ranks of Wydad Casablanca, before emigrating to the United States with his parents at age 11 to join the youth team of New York Red Bulls playing in the PDA Academy. Growing up in Bayonne, New Jersey, he attended Saint Benedict's Preparatory School, where he won 2011 Prep Player of the Year and was All-Prep First Team in his junior and senior years. He was leading goal scorer that year with 24 overall, taking his team to the playoffs and the national championship. Following his University-preparatory school career he joined the Saint Peter's College, finishing his first season with the Peacocks with 2011–12 All-MAAC Second Team and All-MAAC Rookie Team honors.

=== Maccabi Haifa ===
Sadaoui joined Israeli Premier League side Maccabi Haifa on 7 February 2013 after two seasons at Saint Peter's. Not making his debut in the first team, he was loaned to Hapoel Kfar Saba on a 6-month loan spell for the second half of the 2012–13 Liga Leumit season, making his professional debut in the second tier of professional football in Israel on 15 February 2013 in a 3–0 win against Hapoel Petah Tikva coming on as a 42-minute substitute. The following season saw Sadaoui serving a second loan spell with Hapoel Nazareth Illit for the entire season, parting ways with Maccabi Haifa after the season.

=== Ajax Cape Town ===
The summer of 2014 saw Sadaoui transfer to South African Premier Soccer League side Ajax Cape Town playing under newly appointed manager Roger De Sá. He scored three goals in three matches for Ajax Cape Town, winning the 2015 MTN 8, before parting ways with the club in October.

=== Miami United ===
Following his season with Ajax CT in South Africa, Sadaoui joined National Premier Soccer League side Miami United, helping the club from Southern Florida to their second league championship, before departing for Honduras, signing with top flight club Real España.

=== Real España ===
Sadaoui joined Real España in the Summer of 2016. Just days after arriving in Honduras it was announced by head coach Mauro Reyes that Sadaoui would no longer be training with the team, being waived from the squad. He was again free to search for a new club.

=== Al-Khaburah ===
On 6 September 2016 it was announced that Sadaoui had joined Al-Khaburah from Oman, competing in the Omantel Professional League.

=== Raja CA ===
On 5 August 2020 it was announced that Raja CA and Sadaoui had agreed to terms on a 3-year contract.

=== AS FAR ===
In 2021, Sadaoui joined FAR.

=== FC Goa ===
On 19 July 2022, Sadaoui signed for Indian Super League club FC Goa.

=== Kerala Blasters ===
On 2 July 2024, Sadaoui joined Kerala Blasters on a two-year contract. On 1 August 2024, he scored a hat-trick on his debut in a 8–0 win against Mumbai City in the 2024 Durand Cup. On 10 August 2024, he scored his second hat-trick against CISF Protectors. After netting 6 goals throughout the entirety of the tournament, Sadaoui would win the Golden Boot award for topping the goal-scoring charts in that year's Durand Cup. His first league goal for the club came against East Bengal FC on 22 September, where he scored the equalizer as the Blasters won the match 2–1 at home. On the next week, Noah would score the equalizing goal for the Blasters against NorthEast United FC as they drew the match by the score of 1–1. Noah would score in his third consecutive league game on 3 August against Odisha FC, where he scored the second goal for the Blasters in a 2–2 draw.

==== Loan to Dewa United ====
On 22 January 2026, Sadaoui was loaned to Indonesian club Dewa United until the end of the season.

== International career ==
Sadaoui holds both American and Moroccan passports and was eligible to represent either on international level. He was included in Morocco national football team for the 2020 African Nations Championship. He made his debut for the team in the opening group game against Togo on 18 January 2021, he substituted Zakaria Hadraf in the 80th minute. He started both the semi-final against Cameroon and the final against Mali, as Morocco won the tournament.

== Career statistics ==
=== Club ===
As of match played 31 October 2026

Appearances and goals by club, season and competition
Club	Season	League			National cup (Note: Includes Nedbank Cup, Egypt Cup, Moroccan Throne Cup, Super Cup)		Continental		Other		Total	
Club	Season	Division	Apps	Goals	Apps	Goals	Apps	Goals	Apps	Goals	Apps	Goals
Maccabi Haifa	2012–13	Israeli Premier League	0	0	0	0	—		—		0	0
Hapoel Kfar Saba (loan)	2012–13	Liga Leumit	7	0	0	0	—		—		7	0
Hapoel Nof HaGalil (loan)	2013–14	Liga Leumit	11	0	0	0	—		—		11	0
Ajax Cape Town	2014–15	South African Premier Division	2	1	1	2	—		—		3	3
ENPPI	2018–19	Egyptian Premier League	15	2	2	2	—		—		17	4
MC Oujda	2018–19	Botola	17	1	0	0	—		—		17	1
MC Oujda	2019–20	Botola	27	12	0	0	—		—		27	12
MC Oujda	Total		44	13	0	0	0	0	0	0	44	13
Raja CA	2020–21	Botola	18	2	2	0	9 (Note: Two appearances in CAF Champions League, seven appearances and two goals in CAF Confederation Cup)	2	1 (Note: Appearance in Arab Club Champions Cup)	0	30	4
AS FAR	2021–22	Botola	15	1	0	0	2 (Note: Appearances in CAF Confederation Cup)	0	—		17	1
Goa	2022–23	Indian Super League	20	9	3	2	—		—		23	11
Goa	2023–24	Indian Super League	23	11	3	1	—		5 (Note: Appearance(s) in Durand Cup)	6	31	18
Goa	Total		43	20	6	3	0	0	5	6	54	29
Kerala Blasters	2024–25	Indian Super League	19	7	2	1	—		4	6	24	14
Kerala Blasters	2025–26	Indian Super League	0	0	3	0	—		—		3	0
Kerala Blasters	Total		19	7	5	1	0	0	4	6	27	14
Dewa United Banten (loan)	2025–26	Super League	13	1	0	0	2 (Note: Appearances in AFC Challenge League)	0	—		15	1
Dewa United Banten	2026–27	Super League	4	1	0	0	0	0	—		4	1
Career total			191	48	16	8	13	2	10	12	229	70

=== International ===
As of matches played till 7 February 2021

National team	Year	Apps	Goals
Morocco	2021	4	0
Total		4	0

== Honours ==
Ajax Cape Town

- MTN 8: 2015

Miami United

- NPSL Conference Champions: 2016

Raja CA

- CAF Confederation Cup: 2020–21

Morocco

- African Nations Championship: 2020

Individual

- 2010 All-Prep First Team
- 2011 All-Prep First Team
- 2011 Prep Player of the Year
- 2011–12 All-MAAC Second Team
- 2011–12 All-MAAC Rookie team
- Durand Cup Golden Boot: 2024
