= Carlos Martínez (footballer, born June 1986) =

Spanish footballer

Personal information
- Full name: Carlos Martínez Rodríguez
- Date of birth: 27 June 1986 (age 40)
- Place of birth: Barcelona, Spain
- Height: 1.85 m (6 ft 1 in)
- Position: Striker

Team information
- Current team: Goa
- Number: 9

Youth career
- 1996–1998: Mataró
- 1998–2002: Barcelona
- 2002–2005: Premià

Senior career*
Years	Team	Apps	(Gls)
2005–2006	Badalona B	15	(8)
2006	Cerdanyola	6	(2)
2006–2007	Sant Celoni	10	(6)
2007	Rubí	16	(5)
2007–2009	Gramenet B	87	(47)
2009–2010	Gramenet	15	(4)
2010–2012	Terrassa	71	(34)
2012–2015	Olot	114	(52)
2015–2017	Villarreal B	74	(35)
2017–2018	Tokyo Verdy	30	(2)
2018–2020	Hércules	54	(17)
2020–2023	Andorra	93	(35)
2023–2024	Goa	23	(10)
- * Club domestic league appearances and goals as of 03:09, 1 May 2024 (UTC)

Carlos Martínez Rodríguez (Spanish pronunciation: [ˈkaɾlos maɾˈtineθ roˈðɾiɣeθ]; born 27 June 1986), sometimes known as Carlitos [kaɾˈlitos], is a former Spanish professional footballer who played as a striker.

== Club career ==
Born in Barcelona, Catalonia, Martínez made his senior debut with CF Badalona's reserves in Primera Catalana, and subsequently represented EF UE Cerdanyola, CE Sant Celoni, UE Rubí and UDA Gramenet's B-team in the regional leagues. In 2011, after playing for the main squad of Gramenet in Tercera División, he signed for Terrassa FC of the same tier.

In May 2012, Martínez signed with UE Olot also in division four. He scored 31 goals during the season, which included a hat-trick against Arandina CF and five goals in the promotion play-offs, as the club achieved promotion to the Segunda División B.

On 3 July 2015, Martínez signed for the reserve team of Villarreal after having scored 57 goals for Olot. On 30 August, he scored for the first time for his new club by finding the net twice in a 2–0 victory against his former club Olot.

On 23 July 2017, after two years with Villarreal B, Martínez moved abroad and joined Japanese J2 League club Tokyo Verdy managed by Miguel Ángel Lotina. On 3 July 2018, he returned to Spain and joined Hércules CF.

On 16 January 2020, Martínez moved to fellow third division side FC Andorra, and helped the side in their first-ever promotion to Segunda División in 2022. He left the club on 20 June 2023 after scoring 35 goals in 101 matches, and subsequently signed for Indian Super League club FC Goa. With Goa, Martínez made his debut on 2 October against Punjab, in which he scored the lone goal.
