= List of NorthEast United FC players =

NorthEast United FC is a professional association football club based in Guwahati, Assam, India, that plays in Indian Super League. The club was formed in 2014 and played its first competitive match on 13 October 2014 and won against Kerala Blasters FC 1–0.

== List of Indian players ==
As of 10 September 2022.

Appearance and goal totals only include matches in Indian Super League, which was first established in 2014. Substitute appearances are included.

Name	Nat	Pos^{[NB]}	NorthEast United career	League appearances	League goals	Ref
Rehenesh TP	(India)	Goalkeeper	2014—2019	49	0	
Kunzang Bhutia	(India)	Goalkeeper	2014	0	0	
Aiborlang Khongjee	(India)	Defender	2014—2015	21	0	
Robin Gurung	(India)	Defender	2014—2016	24	0	
Jibon Singh	(India)	Defender	2014	0	0	
Zodingliana Ralte	(India)	Midfielder	2014	10	0	
Milan Singh	(India)	Midfielder	2014; 2019—20	18	0	
Boithang Haokip	(India)	Midfielder	2014—2015	12	1	
David Ngaihte	(India)	Midfielder	2014	2	0	
Seiminlen Doungel	(India)	Midfielder	2014; 2017—18	25	5	
Redeem Tlang	(India)	Midfielder	2014; 2018—2020	36	4	
Durga Boro	(India)	Forward	2014	11	1	
Alen Deory	(India)	Forward	2014—2015	7	0	
Lalthuammawia Ralte	(India)	Goalkeeper	2015	0	0	
Zohmingliana Ralte	(India)	Defender	2015	2	0	
Yumnam Raju	(India)	Defender	2015	10	0	
Marlangki Suting	(India)	Defender	2015	1	0	
Reagan Singh	(India)	Defender	2015—2020	69	0	
Sanju Pradhan	(India)	Midfielder	2015	11	0	
Halicharan Narzary	(India)	Midfielder	2015—2018	28	0	
Siam Hanghal	(India)	Midfielder	2015	12	0	
Seityasen Singh	(India)	Midfielder	2015—2016, 2018—19	15	3	
Subrata Pal	(India)	Goalkeeper	2016	11	0	
Nirmal Chettri	(India)	Defender	2016—2018	24	0	
Shouvik Ghosh	(India)	Defender	2016, 2018—2020	10	1	
Salam Ranjan Singh	(India)	Defender	2016	2	0	
Rowllin Borges	(India)	Midfielder	2016—2019	48	4	
Fanai Lalrempuia	(India)	Midfielder	2015—2021	17	0	
Lallianzuala Chhangte	(India)	Midfielder	2016	1	0	
Jerry Mawihmingthanga	(India)	Midfielder	2016	1	0	
Sumeet Passi	(India)	Forward	2016	4	0	
Ravi Kumar	(India)	Goalkeeper	2017–2018	2	0	
Ishan Debnath	(India)	Goalkeeper	2017–2018	0	0	
Robert Lalthlamuana	(India)	Defender	2017–2019	23	0	
Gursimrat Singh Gill	(India)	Defender	2017–2018	5	0	
Abdul Hakku	(India)	Defender	2017–2018	4	0	
Sushil Meitei	(India)	Midfielder	2017–2019	1	0	
Lalrindika Ralte	(India)	Midfielder	2017–2018	1	0	
Malemngamba Meitei	(India)	Forward	2017–2018	8	0	
Pawan Kumar	(India)	Goalkeeper	2018–2020	17	0	
Gurmeet Singh	(India)	Goalkeeper	2018–2021	9	0	
Pawan kumar	(India)	Defender	2018–2019	0	0	
Keegan Pereira	(India)	Defender	2018–2019	15	0	
Gurwinder Singh	(India)	Defender	2018–2019	12	0	
Provat Lakra	(India)	Defender	2018–2023	36	0	
Rupert Nongrum	(India)	Midfielder	2018–2020; 2022–2023	5	0	
Nikhil Kadam	(India)	Midfielder	2018–2020	22	0	
Lalthathanga Khawlhring	(India)	Midfielder	2018–2020	29	0	
Girik Mahesh Khosla	(India)	Forward	2018–2019	1	0	
Subhasish Roy Chowdhury	(India)	Goalkeeper	2019–2022	40	0	
Soram Poirei	(India)	Goalkeeper	2019–2020	2	0	
Wayne Vaz	(India)	Defender	2019–2021	10	0	
Rakesh Pradhan	(India)	Defender	2019–2021	16	0	
Nim Dorjee Tamang	(India)	Defender	2019–2021	12	0	
Alfred Lalroutsang	(India)	Midfielder	2019–2020; 2022–	1	0	
Lalengmawia	(India)	Midfielder	2019–2021	32	1	
Ninthoinganba Meetei	(India)	Forward	2019–2021	24	0	
Dipu Mirdha	(India)	Forward	2019–2020; 2022–	2	0	
Sanjiban Ghosh	(India)	Goalkeeper	2020–2022	0	0	
Nikhil Deka	(India)	Goalkeeper	2020–present	0	0	
Ponif Vaz	(India)	Defender	2020–2021	0	0	
Gurjinder Kumar	(India)	Defender	2020–2023	45	0	
Ashutosh Mehta	(India)	Defender	2020–2021	18	1	
Nabin Rabha	(India)	Defender	2020–2022	0	0	
Mashoor Shereef	(India)	Defender	2020–2023	34	1	
Rochharzela	(India)	Midfielder	2020–present	37	4	
Imran Khan	(India)	Midfielder	2020–2023	37	2	
Pragyan Gogoi	(India)	Midfielder	2020–present	31	0	
Britto PM	(India)	Forward	2020–2021	11	0	
Lalkhawpuimawia	(India)	Forward	2020–2022	12	0	
V.P. Suhair	(India)	Forward	2020–2022	38	7	
Mirshad Michu	(India)	Goalkeeper	2021–present	21	0	
Joe Zoherliana	(India)	Defender	2021–present	21	0	
Tondonba Singh	(India)	Defender	2021–present	17	0	
Jestin George	(India)	Defender	2021–2022	5	0	
Mohammed Irshad	(India)	Defender	2021–present	25	2	
Emanuel Lalchhanchhuaha	(India)	Midfielder	2021–present	9	0	
Pragyan Medhi	(India)	Midfielder	2021–present	0	0	
Sehnaj Singh	(India)	Midfielder	2021–2023	11	0	
Laldanmawia Ralte	(India)	Forward	2021–present	19	4	
William Lalnunfela	(India)	Forward	2021–2022	2	0	
Gani Nigam	(India)	Forward	2021–present	14	0	
Manvir Singh Jr.	(India)	Forward	2021–2022	5	0	
Jithin MS	(India)	Midfielder	2022–	16	1	
Emil Benny	(India)	Midfielder	2022–	16	0	
Arindam Bhattacharya	(India)	Goalkeeper	2022–2023	10	0	
Parthib Gogoi	(India)	Forward	2022–	18	3	
Gaurav Bora	(India)	Defender	2022–	14	0	
Khoirom Singh	(India)	Goalkeeper	2022–	0	0	
Hira Mondal	(India)	Defender	2023–	6	0	
Alex Saji	(India)	Defender	2023	7	0	

== List of overseas players ==
- Appearance and goal totals only include matches in Indian Super League, which was first established in 2014. Substitute appearances are included.
- The list includes all the overseas players registered under a NorthEast United FC contract. Some players might not have featured in a professional game for the club.

Name	Nat	Pos^{[NB]}	NorthEast United career	League appearances	League goals	Ref
Alexandros Tzorvas	(Greece)	Goalkeeper	2014–2015	2	0	
Joan Capdevila	(Spain)	Defender	2014–2015	12	0	
Massamba Sambou	(Senegal)	Defender	2014–2015	6	2	
Tomáš Josl	(Czech Republic)	Defender	2014–2015	16	0	
Miguel Garcia	(Portugal)	Defender	2014–2016	13	0	
Kondwani Mtonga	(Zambia)	Midfielder	2014–2016	13	2	
Isaac Chansa	(Zambia)	Midfielder	2014–2015	8	0	
Guilherme Batata	(Brazil)	Midfielder	2014–2015	10	1	
Do Dong-hyun	(South Korea)	Forward	2014–2015	8	0	
James Keene	(England)	Forward	2014–2015	10	0	
Leo Bertos	(New Zealand)	Forward	2014–2015	4	0	
Luis Yanes	(Colombia)	Forward	2014–2015	6	0	
Koke	(Spain)	Forward	2014–2015	12	4	
Gennaro Bracigliano	(France)	Goalkeeper	2015–2016	2	0	
Cédric Hengbart	(France)	Defender	2015–2016	12	0	
André Bikey	(Cameroon)	Defender	2015–2016	9	1	
Carlos Javier López	(Argentina)	Defender	2015–2016	9	0	
Simão Sabrosa	(Portugal)	Midfielder	2015–2016	10	3	
Silas	(Portugal)	Midfielder	2015–2018	12	1	
Nicolás Vélez	(Argentina)	Forward	2015–2017	25	8	
Diomansy Kamara	(Senegal)	Forward	2015–2016	12	3	
Francis Dadzie	(Ghana)	Forward	2015–2016	11	1	
Victor Mendy	(Senegal)	Forward	2015–2016	4	1	
Wellington Gomes	(Brazil)	Goalkeeper	2016–2017	2	0	
Wellington Priori	(Brazil)	Defender	2016–2017	12	0	
Gustavo Lazzaretti	(Brazil)	Defender	2016–2017	11	0	
Maílson Alves	(Brazil)	Defender	2016–2017	9	0	
Didier Zokora	(Ivory Coast)	Midfielder	2016–2017	14	0	
Katsumi Yusa	(Japan)	Midfielder	2016–2017	14	1	
Romaric	(Ivory Coast)	Midfielder	2016–2017	12	2	
Sasha Aneff	(Uruguay)	Forward	2016–2017	1	0	
Emiliano Alfaro	(Uruguay)	Forward	2016–2017	13	5	
Robert Cullen	(Japan)	Forward	2016–2017	8	0	
Sambinha	(Guinea-Bissau)	Defender	2017–2018	14	1	
José Gonçalves	(Portugal)	Defender	2017–2018	15	0	
Martín Díaz	(Uruguay)	Defender	2017–2018	16	0	
Adilson Goiano	(Brazil)	Midfielder	2017–2018	4	0	
Marcinho	(Brazil)	Midfielder	2017–2018	15	4	
Hélio Pinto	(Portugal)	Midfielder	2017–2018	3	0	
Maic Sema	(Sweden)	Forward	2017–2018	7	0	
Odaïr Fortes	(Cape Verde)	Forward	2017–2018	4	0	
John Mosquera	(Colombia)	Forward	2017–2018	8	1	
Luis Alfonso Páez	(Colombia)	Forward	2017–2018	6	0	
Danilo	(Brazil)	Forward	2017–2018	18	1	
Janeiler Rivas Palacios	(Colombia)	Defender	2018–2019	4	0	
Mislav Komorski	(Croatia)	Defender	2018–2020	23	0	
Mato Grgić	(Croatia)	Defender	2018–2019	19	0	
José David Leudo	(Colombia)	Midfielder	2018–2020	33	1	
Federico Gallego	(Uruguay)	Midfielder	2018–2022	47	9	
Augustine Okrah	(Ghana)	Midfielder	2018–2019	4	0	
Panagiotis Triadis	(Greece)	Midfielder	2018–2020	14	2	
Juan Cruz Mascia	(Uruguay)	Forward	2018–2019	15	3	
Bartholomew Ogbeche	(Nigeria)	Forward	2018–2019	18	12	
Asamoah Gyan	(Ghana)	Forward	2019–2020	8	4	
Andy Keogh	(Republic of Ireland)	Forward	2019–2020	7	1	
Martín Cháves	(Uruguay)	Forward	2019–2020	18	3	
Dylan Fox	(Australia)	Defender	2020–2021	21	0	
Benjamin Lambot	(Belgium)	Defender	2020–2021	21	2	
Khassa Camara	(Mauritania)	Midfielder	2020–2022	28	1	
Luís Machado	(Portugal)	Forward	2020–2021	22	7	
Kwesi Appiah	(Ghana)	Forward	2020–2021	8	3	
Idrissa Sylla	(Guinea)	Forward	2020–2021	12	3	
Deshorn Brown	(Jamaica)	Forward	2021–2022	22	12	
Patrick Flottmann	(Australia)	Defender	2021–2022	15	1	
Hernán Santana	(Spain)	Midfielder	2021–2022	17	1	
Mathias Coureur	(Martinique)	Forward	2021–2022	10	1	
Zakaria Diallo	(Senegal)	Defender	2022	7	0	
Marcelinho	(Brazil)	Forward	2022	8	1	
Marco Sahanek	(Austria)	Forward	2022	7	1	
Michael Jakobsen	(Denmark)	Defender	2022–2023	10	0	
Aaron Evans	(Australia)	Defender	2022–2023	18	2	
Alisher Kholmurodov	(Tajikistan)	Defender	2023	0	0	
Jon Gaztañaga	(Spain)	Midfielder	2022–2023	13	0	
Joseba Beitia	(Spain)	Midfielder	2023	5	0	
Romain Philippoteaux	(France)	Midfielder	2022–	18	2	
Sylvester Igboun	(Nigeria)	Forward	2022	1	0	
Matt Derbyshire	(England)	Forward	2022–2023	8	1	
Wilmar Jordán	(Colombia)	Forward	2023	11	8	
Kule Mbombo	(Democratic Republic of the Congo)	Forward	2023	6	0	

== Notable former players ==
- Players who have represented their nations in FIFA World Cup.
- (Greece) Alexandros Tzorvas
- (Spain) Joan Capdevila
- (Trinidad and Tobago) Cornell Glen
- (New Zealand) Leo Bertos
- (Portugal) Simão Sabrosa
- (Ivory Coast) Didier Zokora
- (Ivory Coast) Romaric
- (Nigeria) Bartholomew Ogbeche
- (Ghana) Asamoah Gyan
