= 2024–25 NorthEast United FC season =

2024–25 season of NorthEast United FC

NorthEast United
2024–25 season
- CEO: Mandar Tamhane
- Head Coach: Juan Pedro Benali
- Stadium: Indira Gandhi Athletic Stadium, Guwahati
- Indian Super League: Regular season: 4th Play-offs: Knockouts
- Super Cup: Quarter-finals
- Durand Cup: Champions
- Average home league attendance: 10,526
Home colours	Away colours	Third colours

The 2024–25 season was the club's 11th season in Indian Super League since its establishment in 2014. In addition to the league, they also competed in the Durand Cup and AIFF Super Cup. On 31 August 2024, NorthEast United won their 1st Durand Cup title after defeating Mohun Bagan SG in the final by tie-breakers.

== Personnel ==
=== Current technical staff ===
As of 1 June 2024

Role	Name	Refs.
Head coach	(Spain) Juan Pedro Benali	
Assistant coach	(India) Naushad Moosa	
Goalkeeping coach	(Spain) Manuel Diez Aznar	
Strength and Conditioning coach	(Spain) Javier Caballero	
Team analyst	(India) Amogh Adige	
Physiotherapists	(India) Kapil Sharma (India) Dileep Kumar Jagadesan (India) Sony Chittilappilly Sunny	
Club doctor	(India) Dr Abhinav	
Reserves and U-18 head coach	(India) Suhel Nair	

== Players ==
=== Current squad ===
As of 1 August 2024

Note: Flags indicate national team as defined under FIFA eligibility rules; some limited exceptions apply. Players may hold more than one non-FIFA nationality.

No.	Pos.	Nation	Player
1	GK	IND	Gurmeet Singh
2	DF	IND	Dinesh Singh
3	DF	IND	Tondonba Singh
4	DF	ESP	Míchel Zabaco
5	DF	MAR	Hamza Regragui
6	MF	MAR	Mohammed Ali Bemammer
9	FW	ESP	Guillermo Fernández
10	FW	ESP	Néstor Albiach
11	FW	IND	Parthib Gogoi
12	DF	IND	Asheer Akhtar
13	MF	IND	Mayakkannan
14	FW	MAR	Alaeddine Ajaraie
15	MF	IND	Macarton Nickson

No.	Pos.	Nation	Player
16	FW	IND	Ankith Padmanabhan
17	DF	IND	Robin Yadav
18	MF	IND	Jithin MS
19	MF	IND	Huidrom Thoi Singh
20	GK	IND	Dipesh Chauhan
22	MF	IND	Redeem Tlang
23	MF	IND	Bekey Oram
26	MF	IND	Phalguni Singh
32	GK	IND	Mirshad Michu
33	MF	IND	Shighil Nambrath
36	MF	IND	Shajan Franklin
66	FW	IND	Fredy Chawngthansanga
77	DF	IND	Buanthanglun Samte

== Transfers ==
=== In ===
Position	Player	Transferred From	Fee	Date	Ref.
MF	(India) Mayakkannan	(India) Sreenidi Deccan	Free transfer	26 June 2024	
FW	(Spain) Guillermo Fernández	(Spain) Cultural Leonesa	Free transfer	7 July 2024	
DF	(India) Robin Yadav	(India)	Free transfer	12 July 2024	
FW	(India) Ankith Padmanabhan	(India) Bengaluru	Free transfer	12 July 2024	

=== Out ===
Pos.	Player	Transferred to	Fee	Date	Source
FW	(India) Manvir Singh		End of contract	1 June 2024	
FW	(India) Gani Nigam		End of contract	1 June 2024	
DF	(India) Gaurav Bora		End of contract	1 June 2024	
DF	(India) Hira Mondal		End of contract	1 June 2024	
MF	(India) Rochharzela		End of contract	1 June 2024	
MF	(France) Romain Philippoteaux	Retired	End of contract	1 June 2024	

== Competitions ==
=== Durand Cup ===
==== Group stage ====
Pos	Team	Pld	W	D	L	GF	GA	GD	Pts	Qualification	NEU	BDO	OFC	BSF
1	NorthEast United	3	3	0	0	11	1	+10	9	Advanced to knockout stage			5–1	4–0
2	Bodoland (H)	3	2	0	1	6	5	+1	6		0–2		2–0	4–3
3	Odisha	3	1	0	2	6	7	−1	3					5–0
4	BSF	3	0	0	3	3	13	−10	0					

Source: Twitter
Rules for classification: Group stage tiebreakers
(H) Hosts

30 July 2024	Bodoland	0–2	NorthEast United	Kokrajhar, Assam
15:00 IST		Report	Jithin 49'; Ankith P. 90+2'	Stadium: SAI Stadium; Attendance: 12,210; Referee: I Jamal Mohamed; Man of the Match: Jithin Madathil Subran (NorthEast United)

9 August 2024	NorthEast United	4–0	BSF	Kokrajhar, Assam
19:00 IST	Guillermo 8', 48'; Jithin 20'; Alaeddine 90+7'	Report		Stadium: SAI Stadium; Attendance: 1,635; Referee: Surojit Das; Man of the Match: Guillermo Fernández (NorthEast United FC)

16 August 2024	NorthEast United	5–1	Odisha	Kokrajhar, Assam
19:00 IST	Jithin M. S. 17', 20'; Tankadhar (o.g.) 56'; Guillermo 76'; Thoi 85'	Report	Singson 64'	Stadium: SAI Stadium; Attendance: 3,240; Referee: I Jamal Mohamed; Man of the Match: Jithin M. S. (NorthEast United FC)

==== Knockout stage ====
Quarter-finals
21 August – Kokrajhar
NorthEast United	2
Indian Army	0
21 August – Shillong
Shillong Lajong	2
East Bengal	1
23 August – Jamshedpur
Mohun Bagan	3(6)
Punjab	3(5)
23 August – Kolkata
Bengaluru	1
Kerala Blasters	0

Semi-finals
26 August – Shillong
NorthEast United	3
Shillong Lajong	0
27 August – Kolkata
Mohun Bagan	2(4)
Bengaluru	2(3)

Final
31 August – Kolkata
NorthEast United	2(4)
Mohun Bagan	2(3)

21 August 2024 Quarter-finals	NorthEast United	2–0	Indian Army	Kokrajhar
16:00	Néstor 54'; Guillermo 73'	Report		Stadium: SAI Stadium; Attendance: 7,290; Referee: Surojit Das; Man of the Match: Néstor Albiach (NorthEast United)

26 August 2024 Semi-finals	NorthEast United	3–0	Shillong Lajong	Shillong
17:30	Thoi Singh 13'; Ajaraie 32'; Parthib 90+3'	Report		Stadium: Jawaharlal Nehru Stadium; Attendance: 15,915; Referee: Crystal John; Man of the Match: Huidrom Thoi Singh (NorthEast United)

31 August 2024 Final	Mohun Bagan	2–2 (3–4 p)	NorthEast United	Kolkata
17:30	Cummings 11' (pen.); Sahal 45+5'	Report	Ajaraie 55'; Guillermo 58'	Stadium: Salt Lake Stadium; Attendance: 52,391; Referee: Harish Kundu; Man of the Match: Gurmeet Singh (NorthEast United)
	Penalties
	Cummings (penalty scored); Manvir (penalty scored); Colaco (penalty missed); Petratos (penalty scored); Subhasish (penalty missed)		Guillermo (penalty scored); Zabaco (penalty scored); Parthib (penalty scored); Ajaraie (penalty scored)

=== Indian Super League ===
==== League table ====
Pos	Team	Pld	W	D	L	GF	GA	GD	Pts	Qualification
2	Goa	24	14	6	4	43	27	+16	48	Qualification for the Champions League Two preliminary stage and semi-finals (Note: Goa qualified for the AFC Champions League Two preliminary stage by winning the 2025 Super Cup.)
3	Bengaluru	24	11	5	8	40	31	+9	38 (Note: Head-to-head points: Bengaluru 7, NorthEast 7, Jamshedpur 3; Head-to-head goal difference: Bengaluru +2, NorthEast -2.)	Qualification for the knockouts
4	NorthEast United	24	10	8	6	46	29	+17	38	Qualification for the knockouts
5	Jamshedpur	24	12	2	10	37	43	−6	38	Qualification for the knockouts
6	Mumbai City	24	9	9	6	29	28	+1	36	Qualification for the knockouts

Source: ISL
Rules for classification: 1) points; 2) goal difference; 3) number of goals scored; 4) head-to-head points; 5) head-to-head goal difference; 6) head-to-head goals scored; 7) fair play ranking; 8) drawing of lots
(Note: Head-to-head record is used only after all the matches between the teams in question have been played).

==== Result summary ====
Overall								Home						Away					
Pld	W	D	L	GF	GA	GD	Pts	W	D	L	GF	GA	GD	W	D	L	GF	GA	GD
24	10	8	6	46	29	+17	38	4	4	4	21	16	+5	6	4	2	25	13	+12

=== ISL Playoffs ===
Knockout
4	NorthEast United	0
5	Jamshedpur	2
3	Bengaluru	5
6	Mumbai City	0

Semifinals
1	Mohun Bagan	1	2	3
5	Jamshedpur	2	0	2
2	Goa	0	2	2
3	Bengaluru	2	1	3

Finals
1	Mohun Bagan (a.e.t.)	2
3	Bengaluru	1

30 March 2025	NorthEast United FC	0–2	Jamshedpur	Shillong
19:30 IST		ISL; AIFF; I-League	Stephen 29'; Hernández 90+10'	Stadium: Jawaharlal Nehru Stadium; Attendance: 14,849; Referee: Senthil Nathan Sekaran

=== Super Cup ===
Round of 16
20 April
8	Kerala Blasters	2
9	East Bengal	0
21 April
2	Goa	3
IL4	Gokulam Kerala	0
21 April
7	Odisha	0
10	Punjab	3
23 April
3	Bengaluru	1 (3)
IL2	Inter Kashi (p)	1 (5)
23 April
6	Mumbai City	4
11	Chennaiyin	0
24 April
4	Northeast United	6
13	Mohammedan	0
24 April
5	Jamshedpur	2
12	Hyderabad	0

Quarter-finals
26 April
8	Kerala Blasters	1
1	Mohun Bagan	2
26 April
2	Goa	2
10	Punjab	1
27 April
IL2	Inter Kashi	0
6	Mumbai City	1
27 April
4	Northeast United	0 (4)
5	Jamshedpur (p)	0 (5)

Semi-finals
30 April
1	Mohun Bagan	1
2	Goa	3
30 April
6	Mumbai City	0
5	Jamshedpur	1

Final
3 May
2	Goa	3
5	Jamshedpur	0

24 April 2025 Round of 16	Northeast United	6–0	Mohammedan	Bhubaneswar
16:30 IST (UTC+5:30)	Jitin 3'; Ajaraie 19', 57', 90+2' (pen.); Albiach 43'; Guillermo 66'	Report; PDF; Khel Now		Stadium: Kalinga Stadium; Attendance: 1,781; Referee: Tejas Nagvenkar; Man of the Match: Alaaeddine Ajaraie (Northeast United)

27 April 2025 Quarter-finals	Northeast United	0–0 (4–5 p)	Jamshedpur	Bhubaneswar
20:00 IST (UTC+5:30)		Report; PDF; Khel Now		Stadium: Kalinga Stadium; Attendance: 2,163; Referee: Harish Kundu; Man of the Match: Stephen Eze (Jamshedpur)
	Penalties
	Guillermo (penalty missed); Zabaco (penalty missed); Bemammer (penalty scored); Ajaraie (penalty scored); Albiach (penalty scored); Thoi (penalty scored); Asheer (penalty missed)		(penalty scored) Siverio; (penalty missed) Murray; (penalty scored) Hernández; (penalty scored) Tachikawa; (penalty missed) Eze; (penalty scored) Ashutosh; (penalty scored) Cirkovic

== Statistics ==
=== Squad statistics ===
As of 30 December 2024

No.	Pos	Nat	Player	Total		Indian Super League		Durand Cup		Super Cup	
No.	Pos	Nat	Player	Apps	Goals	Apps	Goals	Apps	Goals	Apps	Goals
Goalkeepers
1	GK	(India) IND	Gurmeet Singh	17	0	13	0	4	0	0	0
32	GK	(India) IND	Mirshad Michu	1	0	0	0	1	0	0	0
20	GK	(India) IND	Dipesh Chauhan	1	0	0	0	1	0	0	0
Defenders
2	DF	(India) IND	Dinesh Singh	15	0	10	0	5	0	0	0
3	DF	(India) IND	Tondonba Singh	11	0	7	0	4	0	0	0
4	DF	(Spain) ESP	Míchel Zabaco	15	1	11	1	4	0	0	0
5	DF	(Morocco) MAR	Hamza Regragui	15	0	9	0	6	0	0	0
12	DF	(India) IND	Asheer Akhtar	18	0	13	0	5	0	0	0
17	DF	(India) IND	Robin Yadav	6	0	3	0	3	0	0	0
77	DF	(India) IND	Buanthanglun Samte	14	0	10	0	4	0	0	0
Midfielders
6	MF	(Morocco) MAR	Mohammed Ali Bemammer	17	1	11	1	6	0	0	0
13	MF	(India) IND	Mayakkannan	18	0	13	0	5	0	0	0
15	MF	(India) IND	Macarton Nickson	13	2	10	2	3	0	0	0
23	MF	(India) IND	Bekey Oram	4	0	3	0	1	0	0	0
26	MF	(India) IND	Phalguni Singh	4	0	2	0	2	0	0	0
17	MF	(India) IND	Danny Meitei	0	0	0	0	0	0	0	0
33	MF	(India) IND	Shighil Nambrath	2	0	0	0	2	0	0	0
Forwards
9	FW	(Spain) ESP	Guillermo Fernández	17	9	11	4	6	5	0	0
10	FW	(Spain) ESP	Néstor Albiach	19	5	13	4	6	1	0	0
11	FW	(India) IND	Parthib Gogoi	16	3	12	2	4	1	0	0
14	FW	(Morocco) MAR	Alaeddine Ajaraie	18	17	13	14	5	3	0	0
16	FW	(India) IND	Ankith Padmanabhan	7	1	3	0	4	1	0	0
18	FW	(India) IND	Jithin MS	19	4	13	0	6	4	0	0
19	FW	(India) IND	Huidrom Thoi Singh	10	2	5	0	5	2	0	0
22	FW	(India) IND	Redeem Tlang	9	0	5	0	4	0	0	0
66	FW	(India) IND	Fredy Chawngthansanga	1	0	1	0	0	0	0	0

=== Goalscorers ===
Rank	No.	Pos.	Player	League	Durand Cup	Super Cup	Total
1	14	FW	(Morocco) Alaeddine Ajaraie	14	3	0	17
2	9	FW	(Spain) Guillermo Fernández	4	5	0	9
3	10	FW	(Spain) Néstor Albiach	4	1	0	5
4	18	FW	(India) Jithin M. S.	0	4	0	4
5	11	FW	(India) Parthib Gogoi	2	1	0	3
6	15	MF	(India) Macarton Nickson	2	0	0	2
6	19	MF	(India) Huidrom Thoi Singh	0	2	0	2
7	6	MF	(Morocco) Mohammed Ali Bemammer	1	0	0	1
7	16	FW	(India) Ankith Padmanabhan	0	1	0	1

Source : World Football

=== Assists ===
Rank	No.	Pos.	Player	League	Durand Cup	Super Cup	Total
1	18	FW	(India) Jithin MS	5	3	0	8
2	14	Fw	(Morocco) Alaaeddine Ajaraie	4	2	0	4
2	11	FW	(India) Parthib Gogoi	3	1	0	4
3	77	DF	(India) Buanthanglun Samte	2	0	0	2
3	5	DF	(Morocco) Hamza Regragui	1	1	0	2
3	9	FW	(Spain) Guillermo Fernández	0	2	0	2
3	19	FW	(India) Huidrom Thoi Singh	1	1	0	2
4	15	MF	(India) Macarton Nickson	1	0	0	1
4	6	MF	(Morocco) Mohammed Ali Bemammer	1	2	0	1
4	4	DF	(Spain) Míchel Zabaco	1	0	0	1
4	2	DF	(India) Dinesh Singh	1	0	0	1
4	22	FW	(India) Redeem Tlang	0	1	0	1
4	13	MF	(India) Mayakkannan	0	1	0	1

=== Disciplinary record ===
As of 15 January 2023

No.	Pos.	Nation	Name	League			Durand Cup			Super Cup			Total		
No.	Pos.	Nation	Name	Booked	(yellow card) (yellow-red card)	Sent off (straight red)	Booked	(yellow card) (yellow-red card)	Sent off (straight red)	Booked	(yellow card) (yellow-red card)	Sent off (straight red)	Booked	(yellow card) (yellow-red card)	Sent off (straight red)
	MF	(India)	Basanta Boro	0	0	0	2	0	0	0	0	0	2	0	0
	DF	(India)	Chiranjeet Gogoi	0	0	0	1	0	0	0	0	0	1	0	0
13	DF	(India)	Gaurav Bora	2	0	0	0	0	0	0	0	0	2	0	0
8	MF	(India)	Imran Khan	1	0	0	0	0	0	0	0	0	1	0	0
22	FW	(India)	Gani Nigam	1	0	0	0	0	0	0	0	0	1	0	0
91	MF	(Spain)	Jon Gaztañaga	6	0	0	0	0	0	0	0	0	6	0	0
7	MF	(India)	Rochharzela	3	0	0	0	0	0	0	0	0	3	0	0
2	DF	(Denmark)	Michael Jakobsen	2	0	0	0	0	0	0	0	0	2	0	0
32	GK	(India)	Mirshad Michu	2	0	0	0	0	0	0	0	0	2	0	0
43	MF	(India)	Pragyan Gogoi	2	0	0	0	0	0	0	0	0	2	0	0
14	DF	(India)	Joe Zoherliana	2	0	0	0	0	0	0	0	0	2	0	0
16	MF	(India)	Mohammed Irshad	2	0	0	0	0	0	0	0	0	2	0	0
6	DF	(India)	Mashoor Shereef	2	0	0	0	0	0	0	0	0	2	0	0
10	MF	(France)	Romain Philippoteaux	1	0	0	0	0	0	0	0	0	1	0	0
24	DF	(Australia)	Aaron Evans	1	0	0	0	0	0	0	0	0	1	0	0
11	FW	(India)	Parthib Sundar Gogoi	1	0	0	0	0	0	0	0	0	1	0	0
29	GK	(India)	Arindam Bhattacharya	1	0	0	0	0	0	0	0	0	1	0	0
45	DF	(India)	Alex Saji	1	0	0	0	0	0	0	0	0	1	0	0
