= 2022–23 NorthEast United FC season =

2022–23 season of NorthEast United FC

NorthEast United
2022–23 season
- Head Coach: Marco Balbul (until 7 December 2022); Vincenzo Alberto Annese (from 8 December 2022, until 28 February 2023); Floyd Pinto (interim, from 1 March 2023)
- Stadium: Indira Gandhi Athletic Stadium, Guwahati
- Indian Super League: 11th
- Super Cup: Semi-final
- Durand Cup: Group stage
- Top goalscorer: League: Wilmar Jordán (8 goals); All: Wilmar Jordán (15 goals)
- Highest home attendance: 8,627 vs Hyderabad (13 October 2022)
- Lowest home attendance: 361 vs Goa (15 January 2023)
- Average home league attendance: 2,971
- Biggest win: NorthEast United 6–3 Churchill Brothers
- Biggest defeat: NorthEast United 0–6 Odisha
Home colours	Away colours	Third colours

The 2022–23 season is the club's ninth season in Indian Super League since its establishment in 2014. In addition to the league, they will also compete in the 2022 Durand Cup and AIFF Super Cup.

== Season overview ==
On 11 August, NorthEast United announced the signing of Marco Balbul as their manager for the upcoming season.

On 12 August, NorthEast United announced the signing of Paul Groves as their assistant manager for the upcoming season. The Highlanders also appoint Floyd Pinto as Indian assistant manager.

On 13 August, NorthEast United announced the appointment of Niall Clark as their strength and conditioning coach for the upcoming season.

On 14 August, the Highlanders announced the contract extension of goalkeepers Mirshad Michu and Nikhil Deka for the upcoming season.

On 15 August, NorthEast United announced the retention of defenders Gurjinder Kumar, Mashoor Shereef, Joe Zoherliana and Provat Lakra for the upcoming season.

On 16 August, NorthEast United announced the retention of midfielders Imran Khan, Pragyan Medhi, Mohammed Irshad, Emanuel Lalchhanchhuaha, Pragyan Gogoi and forwards Rochharzela, Laldanmawia Ralte, Gani Nigam for the upcoming season.

On 17 August, NorthEast United lost 0–6 against Odisha FC in their first match of 2022 Durand Cup.

On 18 August, NorthEast United announced the signing of Jithin MS for the upcoming season.

On 20 August, NorthEast United announced the signing of attacking midfielder Emil Benny for the upcoming season.

On 21 August, NorthEast United lost 1–3 against Army Green in their second match of Durand Cup. Dipu Mirdha scored for the Highlanders in the last minute for a late consolation.

On 23 August, NorthEast United confirmed the signing of Arindam Bhattacharya on its social media and various other platforms for the upcoming season.

On 27 August, NorthEast United lost 0–3 against Kerala Blasters in their 3rd match of Durand Cup.

On 5 September, NorthEast United sign young forward Parthib Sundar Gogoi on a multiyear deal. On this day Highlanders promoted Dipu Mirdha and Alfred Lalroutsang to the first team from reserve team due to their outstanding performance in 2022 Durand Cup.

On 6 September, NorthEast United announced the signing of Spanish midfielder Jon Gaztañaga from Cultural Leonesa for the upcoming season.

== Players ==
=== Squad ===
As of 19 January 2023

Note: Flags indicate national team as defined under FIFA eligibility rules; some limited exceptions apply. Players may hold more than one non-FIFA nationality.

No.	Pos.	Nation	Player
1	GK	IND	Nikhil Deka
3	DF	IND	Tondonba Singh
4	DF	IND	Provat Lakra
5	DF	IND	Gurjinder Kumar (3rd captain)
6	DF	IND	Mashoor Shereef
7	MF	IND	Rochharzela
8	MF	IND	Imran Khan
9	FW	COL	Wilmar Jordán (captain)
10	MF	FRA	Romain Philippoteaux
11	FW	IND	Parthib Gogoi
13	DF	IND	Gaurav Bora (4th captain)
14	DF	IND	Joe Zoherliana
15	MF	IND	Emil Benny
16	DF	IND	Mohammed Irshad
17	FW	IND	Laldanmawia Ralte

No.	Pos.	Nation	Player
18	MF	IND	Jithin MS
19	FW	IND	Dipu Mirdha
20	DF	IND	Hira Mondal
22	FW	IND	Gani Nigam
23	GK	IND	Khoirom Singh
24	DF	AUS	Aaron Evans
25	FW	COD	Kule Mbombo
26	MF	IND	Sehnaj Singh
28	MF	IND	Emanuel Lalchhanchhuaha
29	GK	IND	Arindam Bhattacharya (vice-captain)
30	FW	IND	Alfred Lalroutsang
32	GK	IND	Mirshad Michu
33	DF	TJK	Alisher Kholmurodov
43	MF	IND	Pragyan Gogoi
45	DF	IND	Alex Saji (on loan from Hyderabad)
90	MF	ESP	Joseba Beitia

== Transfers ==
=== In ===
Position	Player	Transferred From	Fee	Date	Ref.
DF	(India) Jirjar Terang	(India) Calangute	Free transfer, will join NorthEast United B	17 August 2022	
MF	(India) Jithin MS	(India) Gokulam Kerala	Free transfer	18 August 2022	
MF	(India) Emil Benny	(India) Gokulam Kerala	Free transfer	20 August 2022	
GK	(India) Arindam Bhattacharya	(India) East Bengal	Free transfer	23 August 2022	
DF	(India) Gaurav Bora	(India) Odisha	Free transfer	25 August 2022	
FW	(India) Dipu Mirdha	(India) NorthEast United B	—	5 September 2022	
FW	(India) Alfred Lalroutsang	(India) NorthEast United B	—	5 September 2022	
GK	(India) Khoirom Singh	(India) NorthEast United B	–	5 October 2022	
FW	(India) Parthib Gogoi	(India) Indian Arrows	Free transfer	5 September 2022	
MF	(Spain) Jon Gaztañaga	(Spain) Cultural Leonesa	Free transfer	6 September 2022	
DF	(Denmark) Michael Jakobsen	(Australia) Adelaide United	Free transfer	8 September 2022	
FW	(England) Matt Derbyshire	(Cyprus) AEK Larnaca	Free transfer	11 September 2022	
DF	(Australia) Aaron Evans	(Indonesia) Persis Solo	Free transfer	20 September 2022	
FW	(Nigeria) Sylvester Igboun	(Russia) Pari Nizhny Novgorod	Free transfer	20 September 2022	
MF	(India) Rupert Nongrum	(India) RoundGlass Punjab	Free transfer	22 October 2022	
FW	(Colombia) Wilmar Jordán	(Venezuela) Portuguesa	Free transfer	21 November 2022	
DF	(India) Hira Mondal	(India) Bengaluru	Free transfer	1 January 2023	
FW	(Democratic Republic of the Congo) Kule Mbombo	(Lithuania) FK Sūduva	Free transfer	11 January 2023	
MF	(Spain) Joseba Beitia	Rajasthan United	Free transfer	25 January 2023	
DF	(Tajikistan) Alisher Kholmurodov	FK Fayzkand	Free transfer	24 March 2023	

=== Loans in ===
Position	Player	Loaned From	Fee	Date	On loan until	Source
DF	(India) Alex Saji	Hyderabad	Undisclosed	4 January 2023	End of Season	

=== Out ===
Pos.	Player	Transferred to	Fee	Date	Source
MF	(Spain) Hernán Santana	(China) Sichuan Jiuniu	Free transfer	10 March 2022	
FW	(Brazil) Marcelinho	(India) Rajasthan United	Loan return	24 March 2022	
MF	(Austria) Marco Sahanek	(Austria) SV Stripfing	Free transfer	1 July 2022	
FW	(India) Lalkhawpuimawia	(India) Churchill Brothers	Free transfer	8 July 2022	
FW	(Jamaica) Deshorn Brown	(United States) Sacramento Republic	Free transfer	22 July 2022	
DF	(France) Zakaria Diallo	(France) AC Le Havre	Free transfer	26 July 2022	
FW	(India) William Lalnunfela	(India) Rajasthan United	Free transfer	1 June 2022	
FW	(India) V.P. Suhair	(India) East Bengal	Undisclosed (Note: Reported as ₹75 Lakhs)	3 August 2022	
GK	(India) Subhasish Roy Chowdhury	(India) Real Kashmir	Free Transfer	1 June 2022	
GK	(India) Sanjiban Ghosh	Free agent	Released	14 August 2022	
DF	(India) Nabin Rabha	(India) Bengaluru United	Free transfer	15 July 2022	
MF	(Uruguay) Federico Gallego	(Uruguay) Sud América	Free transfer	3 September 2022	
DF	(Australia) Patrick Flottmann	Free agent	Released	15 August 2022	
FW	(Nigeria) Sylvester Igboun	Free agent	Contract termination	23 October 2022	
FW	(England) Matt Derbyshire	Free agent	Released	Unknown	
DF	(Denmark) Michael Jakobsen	Free agent	Released	Unknown	
MF	(Spain) Jon Gaztañaga	Free agent	Released	15 January 2023	
MF	(India) Rupert Nongrum	(India) Real Kashmir	Free Transfer	11 January 2023	

=== Loans out ===
Position	Player	Loaned to	Fee	Date	On loan until	Source
DF	(India) Jestin George	Real Kashmir	None	5 September 2022	End of Season	
FW	(India) Manvir Singh	Bengaluru United	None	1 June 2022	End of Season	

== Pre-season and friendlies ==
14 September 2022 Friendly	NorthEast United	0-0	Mawlai SC	Guwahati
				Stadium: Indira Gandhi Athletic Stadium

20 September 2022 Friendly	NorthEast United	6-0	Rangdajied United	Guwahati
	Derbyshire; Mirdha; Benny; Chhara; Nigam	Report		Stadium: Indira Gandhi Athletic Stadium

28 September 2022 Friendly	NorthEast United	4-3	TRAU FC	Guwahati
15:30 IST	Romain; Bora; Evans; Pragyan	Report		Stadium: Indira Gandhi Athletic Stadium

1 October 2022 Friendly	NorthEast United	2-0	NEROCA FC	Guwahati
15:15 IST	Jithin 13'; Nigam 89'	Report		Stadium: Indira Gandhi Athletic Stadium

== Competitions ==
=== Overall record ===
Competition	First match	Last match	Starting round	Final position	Record							
Competition	First match	Last match	Starting round	Final position	Pld	W	D	L	GF	GA	GD	Win %
Durand Cup	17 August 2022	2 September 2022	Matchday 2	Group stage	4	1	0	3	3	12	−9	25.00
Super League	8 October 2022	24 February 2023	Matchday 2	11th	20	1	2	17	20	55	−35	5.00
Super Cup	11 April 2023	22 April 2023	Matchday 1	Semi-final	4	2	0	2	11	11	+0	50.00
Total					28	4	2	22	34	78	−44	14.29

Last updated: 22 April 2023.
Source: Soccerway

=== Indian Super League ===
This season of the Indian Super League will be played across the country in home and away formats after two seasons of hosting it in Goa due to the COVID-19 pandemic.

==== League table ====
Pos	Team	Pld	W	D	L	GF	GA	GD	Pts
7	Goa	20	8	3	9	36	35	+1	27 (Note: Head-to-head points: Goa 3, Chennaiyin 3. Head-to-head goal difference: Goa +1, Chennaiyin -1.)
8	Chennaiyin	20	7	6	7	36	37	−1	27
9	East Bengal	20	6	1	13	22	38	−16	19 (Note: Head-to-head points: East Bengal 3, Jamshedpur 3. Head-to-head goal difference: East Bengal +1, Jamshedpur -1.)
10	Jamshedpur	20	5	4	11	21	32	−11	19
11	NorthEast United	20	1	2	17	20	55	−35	5

Source: Indian Super League
Rules for classification: 1) points; 2) head-to-head points; 3) head-to-head goal difference; 4) head-to-head goals scored; 5) goal difference; 6) number of goals scored; 7) fair play ranking; 8) drawing of lots

==== League Results by round ====
Match	1	2	3	4	5	6	7	8	9	10	11	12	13	14	15	16	17	18	19	20
Ground	A	H	H	A	H	A	H	A	H	A	H	A	H	H	A	A	H	A	H	A
Result	L	L	L	L	L	L	L	L	L	L	W	L	L	D						
League Position	10	10	11	11	11	11	11	11	11	11	11	11	11	11	11					

Updated to match(es) played on 25 December 2022. Source: Indian Super League
A = Away; H = Home; W = Win; D = Draw; L = Loss

===== Matches =====
The fixtures for the 2022–23 season of ISL were announced on 1 September. NorthEast United were set to face Bengaluru on 8 October.

8 October 2022 1	Bengaluru	1–0	NorthEast United	Bengaluru
19:30 IST	Alan 87'	Report	Bora (yellow card) 60'; Gani (yellow card) 81'; Imran (yellow card) 86'	Stadium: Sree Kanteerava Stadium; Referee: Rahul Kumar Gupta; Man of the Match: Alan Costa (Bengaluru)

13 October 2022 2	NorthEast United	0–3	Hyderabad	Guwahati
19:30 IST		Report	Ogbeche 13'; Narzary 69'; Borja 73'	Stadium: Indira Gandhi Athletic Stadium; Attendance: 8,627; Referee: Mondal P.

20 October 2022 3	NorthEast United	1–3	East Bengal	Guwahati
19:30 IST	Derbyshire 90+2'	Report	Silva 11'; Kyriakou 52'; Haokip (yellow card) 68'; O'Doherty 84'	Stadium: Indira Gandhi Athletic Stadium; Attendance: 7,315; Referee: Ashwin; Man of the Match: Charalambos Kyriakou (East Bengal)

30 October 2022 4	Jamshedpur	1–0	NorthEast United FC	Jamshedpur
19:30 IST	Hartley 30'	Report	Gogoi (yellow card) 88'	Stadium: JRD Tata Sports Complex; Attendance: 22,389; Referee: I Jamal Mohamed; Man of the Match: Peter Hartley (Jamshedpur)

5 November 2022 5	NorthEast United	0–3	Kerala Blasters	Guwahati
19:30 IST	Rochharzela (yellow card) 89'	Report	Nishu (yellow card) 36'; Diamantakos 56'; Sahal 85', 90+5'	Stadium: Indira Gandhi Athletic Stadium; Attendance: 4,867; Referee: Crystal John; Man of the Match: Rahul KP (Kerala Blasters)

10 November 2022 6	ATK Mohun Bagan	2–1	NorthEast United	Kolkata
19:30 IST	Liston 35'; Petratos (yellow card) 57'; Hamill (yellow card) 78'; Kauko (yellow card) 85'; Subhasish 90'	Report	Jakobsen (yellow card) 52'; Mashoor (yellow card) 58'; Evans (yellow card) 60' (goal) 81'; Gaztañaga (yellow card) 67'	Stadium: Vivekananda Yuba Bharati Krirangan; Referee: Tejas Nagavenkar; Man of the Match: Subhasish Bose (ATK Mohun Bagan)

25 November 2022 7	NorthEast United FC	1–3	Mumbai City	Guwahati
19:30 IST	Parthib Gogoi 17'; Michael Jakobsen (yellow card) 35'	Report	Jahouh 10' (pen.); Bipin Singh 27'; Jorge Pereyra Díaz 46'	Stadium: Indira Gandhi Athletic Stadium; Attendance: 851; Referee: Senthil Nathan S Man of the Match: Greg Stewart (Mumbai City)

2 December 2022 8	Odisha	2–1	NorthEast United	Bhubaneswar
19:30 IST	Nandha 24'; Jerry 78'; Pedro Martín (yellow card) 90+6'	Report	Rochharzela 60'	Stadium: Kalinga Stadium; Attendance: 7,716; Referee: Umesh Bora; Man of the Match: Saúl Crespo (Odisha)

10 December 2022 9	NorthEast United	3–7	Chennaiyin	Guwahati
19:30 IST	Wilmar Jordán 36' (pen.); Mashoor Shereef (yellow card) 67'; Romain Philippoteaux 73'; Rochharzela 90+5'	Report	Nasser El Khayati 11', 40', 48'; Petar Slišković 45', 57'; Julius Düker 68'; Joe Zoherliana 45' (o.g.)	Stadium: Indira Gandhi Athletic Stadium; Referee: Umesh Bora; Man of the Match: Nasser El Khayati (Chennaiyin)

17 December 2022 10	Goa	2–1	NorthEast United FC	Margao
19:30 IST	Edu Bedia 10'; Iker Guarrotxena 20'		Mirshad Michu (yellow card) 19'; Joe Zoherliana (yellow card) 19'; Wilmar Jordán 90+5' (pen.)	Stadium: Pandit Jawaharlal Nehru Stadium; Attendance: 11,307; Referee: Ashwin; Man of the Match: Anwar Ali (Goa)

24 December 2022 11	NorthEast United	1–0	ATK Mohun Bagan	Guwahati, Assam
19:30 IST	Pragyan (yellow card) 34'; Jordán 70'; Arindam (yellow card) 56'; Chhara (yellow card) 68'; Gazta (yellow card) 82'	Report		Stadium: Indira Gandhi Athletic Stadium; Attendance: 504; Referee: Aditya Purkayastha; Man of the Match: Wilmar Jordán (NEUFC)

29 December 2022 12	Hyderabad	6–1	NorthEast United	Hyderabad
19:30 IST	Siverio 8', 73'; Herrera 24'; Onaindia 30'; Chianese 77'; Bora 80' (o.g.)	Report	Evans 36'; Zoherliana (yellow card) 55'; Philippoteaux (yellow card) 90+3'	Stadium: G. M. C. Balayogi Athletic Stadium; Attendance: 5,907; Referee: I Jamal Mohamed; Man of the Match: Siverio (Hyderabad)

6 January 2023 13	NorthEast United	1-2	Bengaluru	Guwahati
19:30 IST				Stadium: Indira Gandhi Athletic Stadium

15 January 2023 14	NorthEast United	2-2	Goa	Guwahati
19:30 IST		Report		Stadium: Indira Gandhi Athletic Stadium; Attendance: 361; Man of the Match: Wilmar Jordán (NEUFC)

19 January 2023 15	Mumbai City	4-0	NorthEast United	Mumbai
19:30 IST				Stadium: Mumbai Football Arena

29 January 2023 16	Kerala Blasters	2–0	NorthEast United	Kochi, Kerala
19:30 IST	Diamantakos (yellow card) 9', (goal) 42', 44'; Rahul (yellow card) 52'	Report	Saji (yellow card) 6'; Evans (yellow card) 32'; Gurjinder (yellow card) 33'	Stadium: Jawaharlal Nehru Stadium; Referee: Umesh Bora; Man of the Match: Dimitrios Diamantakos (Kerala Blasters)

=== Durand Cup ===
NorthEast United were drawn in the Group D for the 131st edition of the Durand Cup along with two other ISL sides.

==== Group stage ====
Pos	Team	Pld	W	D	L	GF	GA	GD	Pts	Qualification	ODI	KER	ARG	NEU	SDE
1	Odisha	4	4	0	0	11	0	+11	12	Qualify for the Knockout stage	—	2–0	—	6–0	3–0
2	Kerala Blasters	4	2	1	1	6	3	+3	7	Qualify for the Knockout stage	—	—	2–0	—	—
3	Army Green	4	1	1	2	3	4	−1	4		0–1	—	—	—	0–0
4	NorthEast United (H)	4	1	0	3	3	12	−9	3		0–6	0–3	1–3	—	2–0
5	Sudeva Delhi	4	0	2	2	1	6	−5	2		—	1–1	—	—	—

Source: Sportstar
Rules for classification: 1) points; 2) head-to-head points; 3) head-to-head goal difference; 4) goal difference; 5) number of goals scored; 6) drawing of lots
(H) Hosts

==== Matches ====
Win Draw Loss Void

17 August 2022 Group stage	NorthEast United	0–6	Odisha	Guwahati, Assam
17:30 IST		Report	Jerry 14', 38'; Sekar 26'; Panwar (yellow card) 34'; Isak 81'; Maurício 88'; Thoiba 90+1'	Stadium: Indira Gandhi Athletic Stadium; Referee: Pranjal Banerjee; Man of the Match: Jerry Mawihmingthanga (Odisha)

21 August 2022 Group stage	NorthEast United	1–3	Army Green	Guwahati
15:00 IST	Mirdha 90+1'	Report	PC Lallawmkima 9', 55' (yellow card) 45+3'; Somesh Kothari 24'; Sebin Varghese (yellow card) 46'	Stadium: Indira Gandhi Athletic Stadium; Man of the Match: PC Lallawmkima (Army Green)

27 August 2022 Group stage	NorthEast United	0–3	Kerala Blasters	Guwahati
18.00 IST	Boro (yellow card) 35'; Gogoi (yellow card) 62'	Report	Aimen 28', 90'; Ajsal 55'; Kankonkar (yellow card) 66'; Gigi (yellow card) 81'	Stadium: Indira Gandhi Athletic Stadium; Referee: Pranjal Banerjee; Man of the Match: Mohammed Aimen (Kerala Blasters)

2 September 2022 Group stage	NorthEast United	2–0	Sudeva Delhi	Guwahati
15.00 IST	Boro (yellow card) 31'; Mirdha 64'; Nigam 90+6'	Report		Stadium: Indira Gandhi Athletic Stadium; Man of the Match: Dipu Mirdha (NorthEast United)

=== Super Cup ===
==== Group Stage ====
Pos	Team	Pld	W	D	L	GF	GA	GD	Pts	Qualification	NEU	MCI	CHE	CHB
1	NorthEast United	3	2	0	1	10	8	+2	6 (Note: Head-to-head points: NorthEast United 3, Mumbai City 0.)	Advance to knockout stage	—	2–1	—	6–3
2	Mumbai City	3	2	0	1	4	3	+1	6		—	—	1–0	2–1
3	Chennaiyin	3	1	1	1	4	3	+1	4		4–2	—	—	—
4	Churchill Brothers	3	0	1	2	4	8	−4	1		—	—	0–0	—

Source: AIFF
Rules for classification: 1) points; 2) head-to-head points; 3) head-to-head goal difference; 4) goal difference; 5) number of goals scored; 6) drawing of lots

===== Matches =====
11 April 2023 1	Chennaiyin	4–2	NorthEast United	Manjeri
20.30 IST	Ali 17', 82' (yellow card) 83'; Jiteshwor (yellow card) 24'; Vanspaul 33'; Düker 50'; Diagne (yellow card) 73'	Report	Saji (yellow card) 22'; Rochharzela 42'; Irshad (yellow card) 68'; Ralte 90+3'	Stadium: Payyanad Stadium; Attendance: 3,264; Referee: Pranjal Banerjee; Man of the Match: Aakash Sangwan (Chennaiyin)

15 April 2023 4	NorthEast United	2–1	Mumbai City	Manjeri
20.30 IST	Jordán 32' (pen.), 50'; Zoherliana (yellow card) 34'; Tondonba (yellow card) 44'; Benny (yellow card) 71'; Michu (yellow card) 80'	Report	Gurkirat (yellow card) 68'; Apuia 85'; Vikram (yellow card) 89'	Stadium: Payyanad Stadium; Attendance: 4,329; Referee: Pratik Mondal; Man of the Match: Wilmar Jordán (NorthEast United)

19 April 2023 3	NorthEast United	6–3	Churchill Brothers	Kozhikode
20:30 IST	Jordán 27', 43', 51', 70'; A. Kholmurodov (yellow card) 59'; Nigam 78'; Jithin 90+1'	Report	Fernandes 55'; Cháves 60' (yellow card) 71'; Irshad 83' (o.g.); D'Souza (yellow card) 86'	Stadium: EMS Stadium; Attendance: 828; Referee: Rahul Kumar Gupta; Man of the Match: Wilmar Jordán (NorthEast United)

==== Semi Final ====
22 April 2023 SF2	Odisha	3–1	NorthEast United	Manjeri
19:00 IST	Sekar 10', 63'; Maurício 86'	Report	Jordán 2'; Jithin (yellow card) 28'	Stadium: Payyanad Stadium; Attendance: 6,234; Referee: Senthil Nathan S Man of the Match: Nandhakumar Sekar (Odisha)

== Statistics ==
=== Squad statistics ===
As of 22 April 2023

No.	Pos	Nat	Player	Total		Indian Super League		Durand Cup		Super Cup	
No.	Pos	Nat	Player	Apps	Goals	Apps	Goals	Apps	Goals	Apps	Goals
Goalkeepers
1	GK	(India) IND	Nikhil Deka	2	0	0	0	2	0	0	0
23	GK	(India) IND	Khoirom Singh	2	0	0	0	2	0	0	0
29	GK	(India) IND	Arindam Bhattacharya	10	0	10	0	0	0	0	0
32	GK	(India) IND	Mirshad Michu	14	0	10	0	0	0	4	0
Defenders
3	DF	(India) IND	Tondonba Singh	13	0	6+2	0	0+1	0	4	0
4	DF	(India) IND	Provat Lakra	0	0	0	0	0	0	0	0
5	DF	(India) IND	Gurjinder Kumar	13	0	10+1	0	0	0	0+2	0
6	DF	(India) IND	Mashoor Shereef	11	0	6+2	0	0	0	2+1	0
13	DF	(India) IND	Gaurav Bora	14	0	12+2	0	0	0	0	0
14	DF	(India) IND	Joe Zoherliana	16	0	9+3	0	0+1	0	3	0
20	DF	(India) IND	Hira Mondal	7	0	5+1	0	0	0	0+1	0
24	DF	(Australia) AUS	Aaron Evans	18	2	15+3	2	0	0	0	0
33	DF	(Tajikistan) TJK	Alisher Kholmurodov	4	0	0	0	0	0	4	0
45	DF	(India) IND	Alex Saji	11	0	7	0	0	0	3+1	0
—	DF	(India) IND	Bishnu Rabha	4	0	0	0	4	0	0	0
—	DF	(India) IND	Sampow Rongmei	4	0	0	0	4	0	0	0
—	DF	(India) IND	Bimol Singh	2	0	0	0	2	0	0	0
—	DF	(India) IND	Chiranjeet Gogoi	3	0	0	0	3	0	0	0
—	DF	(India) IND	Joni Rabha	4	0	0	0	2+2	0	0	0
—	DF	(India) IND	Jirjar Terang	3	0	0	0	1+2	0	0	0
—	DF	(India) IND	Lanchenba Maibam	1	0	0	0	0+1	0	0	0
Midfielders
8	MF	(India) IND	Imran Khan	15	1	4+10	1	0	0	0+1	0
10	MF	(France) FRA	Romain Philippoteaux	21	2	16+2	2	0	0	2+1	0
15	MF	(India) IND	Emil Benny	20	0	10+6	0	0+1	0	2+1	0
16	MF	(India) IND	Mohammed Irshad	15	0	6+5	0	0	0	4	0
18	MF	(India) IND	Jithin MS	21	2	12+4	1	0+1	0	3+1	1
26	MF	(India) IND	Sehnaj Singh	1	0	1	0	0	0	0	0
28	MF	(India) IND	Emanuel Lalchhanchhuaha	9	0	4+5	0	0	0	0	0
43	MF	(India) IND	Pragyan Gogoi	18	0	12+4	0	0	0	0+2	0
90	MF	(Spain) ESP	Joseba Beitia	9	0	5	0	0	0	4	0
—	MF	(India) IND	Denis Bodo	3	0	0	0	3	0	0	0
—	MF	(India) IND	Basanta Boro	4	0	0	0	4	0	0	0
—	MF	(India) IND	Muktasana Gotimayum	3	0	0	0	3	0	0	0
—	MF	(India) IND	Madhujya Bora	3	0	0	0	3	0	0	0
—	MF	(India) IND	Ningthoujam Binan Singh	4	0	0	0	1+3	0	0	0
—	MF	(India) IND	Sandeep Thapa	3	0	0	0	1+2	0	0	0
—	MF	(India) IND	Anupam Borgohain	1	0	0	0	0+1	0	0	0
—	MF	(India) IND	Dinesh Bhagat	1	0	0	0	0+1	0	0	0
—	MF	(India) IND	Jianchun Rongmei	1	0	0	0	1	0	0	0
Forwards
7	FW	(India) IND	Rochharzela	18	3	7+7	2	0	0	2+2	1
9	FW	(Colombia) COL	Wilmar Jordán	15	15	9+2	8	0	0	4	7
11	FW	(India) IND	Parthib Gogoi	20	3	9+9	3	0	0	0+2	0
17	FW	(India) IND	Laldanmawia Ralte	8	1	0+6	0	0	0	0+2	1
19	FW	(India) IND	Dipu Mirdha	4	2	0	0	4	2	0	0
22	FW	(India) IND	Gani Nigam	13	2	2+6	0	0+1	1	3+1	1
25	FW	(Democratic Republic of the Congo) COD	Kule Mbombo	6	0	6	0	0	0	0	0
30	FW	(India) IND	Alfred Lalroutsang	4	0	0	0	4	0	0	0
—	FW	(India) IND	Jwangbla Brahma	1	0	0	0	0+1	0	0	0
Players who left the club during the season
44	FW	(Nigeria) NGR	Sylvester Igboun	1	0	0+1	0	0	0	0	0
27	FW	(England) ENG	Matt Derbyshire	8	1	6+2	1	0	0	0	0
91	MF	(Spain) ESP	Jon Gaztañaga	13	0	11+2	0	0	0	0	0
12	MF	(India) IND	Rupert Nongrum	1	0	0+1	0	0	0	0	0
2	DF	(Denmark) DEN	Michael Jakobsen	10	0	10	0	0	0	0	0

=== Goalscorers ===
Rank	No.	Pos.	Player	League	Durand Cup	Super Cup	Total
1	9	FW	(Colombia) Wilmar Jordán	8	0	7	15
2	11	FW	(India) Parthib Gogoi	3	0	0	3
2	7	FW	(India) Rochharzela	2	0	1	3
3	24	DF	(Australia) Aaron Evans	2	0	0	2
3	10	MF	(France) Romain Philippoteaux	2	0	0	2
3	18	MF	(India) Jithin M. S.	1	0	1	2
3	19	FW	(India) Dipu Mirdha	0	2	0	2
3	22	FW	(India) Gani Nigam	0	1	1	2
4	27	FW	(England) Matt Derbyshire	1	0	0	1
4	17	FW	(India) Laldanmawia Ralte	0	0	1	1
4	8	MF	(India) Imran Khan	1	0	0	1
Totals				22	3	11	36

Source : World Football

=== Assist ===
Rank	No.	Pos.	Player	League	Durand Cup	Super Cup	Total
1	15	MF	(India) Emil Benny	3	0	0	3
2	10	MF	(France) Romain Philippoteaux	2	0	0	2
2	22	FW	(India) Gani Nigam	2	0	0	2
3	71	MF	(Spain) Jon Gaztañaga	1	0	0	1
3	5	DF	(India) Gurjinder Kumar	1	0	0	1
3	8	MF	(India) Imran Khan	1	0	0	1
3	30	FW	(India) Alfred Lalroutsang	0	1	0	1
3	18	MF	(India) Jithin MS	0	1	0	1
3	43	MF	(India) Pragyan Gogoi	1	0	0	1
3	11	FW	(India) Parthib Gogoi	1	0	0	1
Totals				12	2	0	9

=== Disciplinary record ===
As of 15 January 2023

No.	Pos.	Nation	Name	League			Durand Cup			Super Cup			Total		
No.	Pos.	Nation	Name	Yellow card	(yellow card) (yellow-red card)	Red card	Yellow card	(yellow card) (yellow-red card)	Red card	Yellow card	(yellow card) (yellow-red card)	Red card	Yellow card	(yellow card) (yellow-red card)	Red card
	MF	(India)	Basanta Boro	0	0	0	2	0	0	0	0	0	2	0	0
	DF	(India)	Chiranjeet Gogoi	0	0	0	1	0	0	0	0	0	1	0	0
13	DF	(India)	Gaurav Bora	2	0	0	0	0	0	0	0	0	2	0	0
8	MF	(India)	Imran Khan	1	0	0	0	0	0	0	0	0	1	0	0
22	FW	(India)	Gani Nigam	1	0	0	0	0	0	0	0	0	1	0	0
91	MF	(Spain)	Jon Gaztañaga	6	0	0	0	0	0	0	0	0	6	0	0
7	MF	(India)	Rochharzela	3	0	0	0	0	0	0	0	0	3	0	0
2	DF	(Denmark)	Michael Jakobsen	2	0	0	0	0	0	0	0	0	2	0	0
32	GK	(India)	Mirshad Michu	2	0	0	0	0	0	0	0	0	2	0	0
43	MF	(India)	Pragyan Gogoi	2	0	0	0	0	0	0	0	0	2	0	0
14	DF	(India)	Joe Zoherliana	2	0	0	0	0	0	0	0	0	2	0	0
16	MF	(India)	Mohammed Irshad	2	0	0	0	0	0	0	0	0	2	0	0
6	DF	(India)	Mashoor Shereef	2	0	0	0	0	0	0	0	0	2	0	0
10	MF	(France)	Romain Philippoteaux	1	0	0	0	0	0	0	0	0	1	0	0
24	DF	(Australia)	Aaron Evans	1	0	0	0	0	0	0	0	0	1	0	0
11	FW	(India)	Parthib Sundar Gogoi	1	0	0	0	0	0	0	0	0	1	0	0
29	GK	(India)	Arindam Bhattacharya	1	0	0	0	0	0	0	0	0	1	0	0
45	DF	(India)	Alex Saji	1	0	0	0	0	0	0	0	0	1	0	0

== Coaching staff ==
Role	Name	Refs.
Head coach	(Italy) Vincenzo Alberto Annese	
Assistant coach	(England) Paul Groves	
Assistant coach	(India) Floyd Pinto	
Goalkeeping coach	(India) Dipankar Choudhury	
Strength and Conditioning coach	(Italy) Riccardo Proietti	

== See also ==
- List of NorthEast United FC seasons
