= 2023–24 NorthEast United FC season =

2023–24 season of NorthEast United FC

NorthEast United
2023–24 season
- CEO: Mandar Tamhane
- Head Coach: Juan Pedro Benali
- Stadium: Indira Gandhi Athletic Stadium, Guwahati
- Indian Super League: 7th
- Super Cup: Group stage
- Durand Cup: Semi-finals
- Top goalscorer: League: (Australia) Tomi Juric (India) Parthib Gogoi (Spain) Néstor Albiach (5 goals); All: (India) Parthib Gogoi (10 goals)
- Highest home attendance: 10,193
- Lowest home attendance: 2,893
- Average home league attendance: 5,404
- Biggest win: NorthEast United 4–0 Shillong Lajong
- Biggest defeat: NorthEast United 0–5 East Bengal
Home colours	Away colours	Third colours

The 2023–24 season will be the club's 10th season in Indian Super League since its establishment in 2014. In addition to the league, they will also compete in the Durand Cup and AIFF Super Cup.

== Personnel ==
=== Current technical staff ===
As of 1 June 2023

Role	Name	Refs.
Head coach	(Spain) Juan Pedro Benali	
Assistant coach	(India) Naushad Moosa	
Goalkeeping coach	(Spain) Manuel Diez Aznar	
Strength and Conditioning coach	(Spain) Javier Caballero	
Team analyst	(India) Meet Mandavia	
Physiotherapists	(India) Kapil Sharma (India) Dileep Kumar Jagadesan (India) Sony Chittilappilly Sunny	
Club doctor	(India) Dr Abhinav	
Reserves and U-18 head coach	(India) Subam Rabha	

== Players ==
=== Current squad ===
As of 1 September 2023

Note: Flags indicate national team as defined under FIFA eligibility rules; some limited exceptions apply. Players may hold more than one non-FIFA nationality.

No.	Pos.	Nation	Player
1	GK	IND	Dipesh Chauhan
2	DF	IND	Dinesh Singh
3	DF	IND	Tondonba Singh
4	DF	ESP	Míchel Zabaco
6	MF	MAR	Mohammed Ali Bemammer
7	MF	IND	Rochharzela
8	FW	ESP	Néstor Albiach
10	MF	FRA	Romain Philippoteaux (captain)
11	FW	IND	Parthib Gogoi
12	DF	IND	Asheer Akhtar
13	DF	IND	Gaurav Bora (vice-captain)
14	MF	IND	Pragyan Gogoi (vice-captain)
15	MF	IND	Macarton Louis Nickson
17	FW	IND	Gani Nigam
18	MF	IND	Jithin MS

No.	Pos.	Nation	Player
21	FW	IND	Manvir Singh
22	MF	IND	Redeem Tlang
23	MF	IND	Bekey Oram
25	MF	IND	Huidrom Thoi Singh
26	MF	IND	Phalguni Singh
31	GK	IND	Khoirom Jackson Singh
32	GK	IND	Mirshad Michu
33	MF	IND	Shighil Nambrath
36	MF	IND	Shajan Franklin
44	GK	IND	Nikhil Deka
66	FW	IND	Fredy Chawngthansanga
71	FW	BRA	Ibson Melo
77	DF	IND	Buanthanglun Samte
97	DF	PLE	Yaser Hamed

== Transfers ==
=== In ===
Position	Player	Transferred From	Fee	Date	Ref.
DF	(India) Jestin George	Real Kashmir	Loan return	1 June 2023	
FW	(India) Manvir Singh	Delhi FC	Loan return	1 June 2023	
MF	(India) Phalguni Singh	Sreenidi Deccan	Free transfer	3 July 2023	
FW	(Brazil) Ibson Melo	(Thailand) Khon Kaen United	Free transfer	7 July 2023	
FW	(India) Redeem Tlang	Goa	Free transfer	15 July 2023	
DF	(India) Buanthanglun Samte	TRAU	Free transfer	17 July 2023	
DF	(Spain) Míchel Zabaco	(Spain) Burgos CF	Free transfer	20 July 2023	
DF	(India) Dinesh Singh	Sreenidi Deccan	Free transfer	22 July 2023	
FW	(Spain) Néstor Albiach	(Spain) Rayo Majadahonda	Free transfer	25 July 2023	
MF	(India) Shighil Nambrath	Bengaluru B	Undisclosed	27 July 2023	
FW	(India) Fredy Chawngthansanga	Bengaluru B	Free transfer	27 July 2023	

=== Out ===
Pos.	Player	Transferred to	Fee	Date	Source
FW	(Democratic Republic of the Congo) Kule Mbombo	(Georgia (country)) FC Telavi	End of contract	17 June 2023	
FW	(Colombia) Wilmar Jordán		End of contract	17 June 2023	
DF	(Australia) Aaron Evans		End of contract	17 June 2023	
MF	(Spain) Joseba Beitia		End of contract	17 June 2023	
DF	(Tajikistan) Alisher Kholmurodov	(Tajikistan) Regar-TadAZ Tursunzoda	End of contract	17 June 2023	
FW	(India) Laldanmawia Ralte		End of contract	17 June 2023	
MF	(India) Sehnaj Singh		End of contract	17 June 2023	
GK	(India) Arindam Bhattacharya		End of contract	16 June 2023	
MF	(India) Imran Khan	Jamshedpur	End of contract	16 June 2023	
DF	(India) Gurjinder Kumar		End of contract	16 June 2023	
DF	(India) Mashoor Shereef		End of contract	16 June 2023	
DF	(India) Provat Lakra	Jamshedpur		16 June 2023	

== Competitions ==
=== Overall record ===
Competition	First match	Last match	Starting round	Final position	Record							
Competition	First match	Last match	Starting round	Final position	Pld	W	D	L	GF	GA	GD	Win %
Super League	24 September 2023	TBA	Matchday 1	TBD	8	2	3	3	9	12	−3	25.00
Durand Cup	4 August 2023	29 August 2023	Group Stage	Semi Final	5	3	2	0	12	5	+7	60.00
Super Cup	TBD	TBD	TBD	TBD	0	0	0	0	0	0	+0	—
Total					13	5	5	3	21	17	+4	38.46

Source: Soccerway

=== Indian Super League ===
Pos	Team	Pld	W	D	L	GF	GA	GD	Pts	Qualification
5	Kerala Blasters	22	10	3	9	32	31	+1	33	Qualification for the knockouts
6	Chennaiyin	22	8	3	11	26	36	−10	27	Qualification for the knockouts
7	NorthEast United	22	6	8	8	28	32	−4	26	
8	Punjab	22	6	6	10	28	35	−7	24 (Note: Head-to-head points: Punjab 4, East Bengal 1.)	
9	East Bengal	22	6	6	10	27	29	−2	24	Qualification for the Champions League Two preliminary stage (Note: East Bengal qualified for the AFC Champions League Two preliminary stage by winning the 2024 Super Cup.)

Source: Indian Super League
Rules for classification: 1) points; 2) head-to-head points; 3) head-to-head goal difference; 4) head-to-head goals scored; 5) goal difference; 6) number of goals scored; 7) fair play ranking

==== Matches ====
The first eleven league fixtures were announced on 7 September 2023.

Win Draw Loss Fixtures

24 September 2023 1	NorthEast United	1–2	Mumbai City	Guwahati
20:00 IST	Gogoi 32'; Bemammer (yellow card) 40'	Report	Díaz 26', 38'; Mishra (yellow card) 29'; van Nieff (yellow card) 45+3'; Stewart (yellow card) 86'	Stadium: Indira Gandhi Athletic Stadium; Attendance: 7,259

29 September 2023 2	NorthEast United	3–0	Chennaiyin	Guwahati
19:30 IST	Parthib Gogoi 42'; Phalguni Singh 48'; Asheer Akhtar 90+10'			Stadium: Indira Gandhi Athletic Stadium

6 October 2023 3	Punjab FC	1–1	NorthEast United	New Delhi
17:30 IST	Melroy Assisi 63'		Parthib Gogoi 45+1'	Stadium: Jawaharlal Nehru Stadium

21 October 2023 4	Kerala Blasters	1–1	NorthEast United	Kochi
20:00 IST	Danish 49'; Rahul (yellow card) 90+6'	Report	Néstor 12'; Akhtar (yellow card) 21'; Hamed (yellow card) 42'; Bemammer (yellow card) 60'; Parthib (yellow card) 72'	Stadium: Jawaharlal Nehru Stadium; Attendance: 33,830; Referee: Harish Kundu; Man of the Match: Míchel Zabaco (NorthEast United)

26 October 2023 5	NorthEast United	2–1	Jamshedpur	Guwahati
20:00 IST	Zabaco 90+4'; Melo 90+9' (pen.)	Report	Chaudhari (yellow card) 9'; Chukwu (penalty missed) 19' 19'; Stevanović (yellow card) 85'; Barla (yellow card) 87'	Stadium: Indira Gandhi Athletic Stadium; Attendance: 7,739; Referee: Pratik Mondal

3 November 2023 6	Odisha	1–0	NorthEast United	Bhubaneswar
20:00 IST	Diego Maurício 37'			Stadium: Kalinga Stadium; Attendance: 33,830

26 November 2023 7	NorthEast United	1-1	Bengaluru	Guwahati
20:00 IST	Aleksandar Jovanović 45+3' (o.g.)		Chhetri 36' (pen.)	Stadium: Indira Gandhi Athletic Stadium

4 December 2023 8	East Bengal	5–0	NorthEast United	Kolkata
20:00 IST	Herrera 14'; Silva 24', 66' (yellow card) 45+1'; Naorem Mahesh Singh (yellow card) 44'; Sekar 62', 81'; Rakip (yellow card) 90+3'	Report	Singh (yellow card) 70'; Macarton Louis Nickson (yellow card) 77'; Tlang (yellow card) 90+3'	Stadium: Salt Lake Stadium; Attendance: 6,973; Referee: Aditya Purkayastha; Man of the Match: Nandhakumar Sekar (East Bengal)

=== Durand Cup ===
Group C

Pos	Team	Pld	W	D	L	GF	GA	GD	Pts	Qualification	GOA	NEU	SHI	DTH
1	Goa	3	2	1	0	11	2	+9	7	Qualify for the knockout stage	—	—	6–0	3–0
2	NorthEast United (H)	3	2	1	0	9	3	+6	7	Qualify for the knockout stage	2–2	—	4–0	3–1
3	Shillong Lajong	3	1	0	2	2	11	−9	3		—	—	—	—
4	Downtown Heroes	3	0	0	3	2	8	−6	0		—	—	1–2	—

Source: Twitter
Rules for classification: Group stage tiebreakers
(H) Hosts

==== Matches ====
4 August 2023	NorthEast United	4–0	Shillong Lajong	Guwahati
18.00 IST	Gogoi 26', 65', 70'; Philippoteaux 35' (pen.)	Report		Stadium: Indira Gandhi Athletic Stadium; Attendance: 13,450; Referee: Senthil Nathan S Man of the Match: Parthib Gogoi (NorthEast United)

12 August 2023	NorthEast United	2–2	Goa	Guwahati
14.30 IST	M. Singh 24'; Jhingan 52' (o.g.)	Report	Borges 45+4'; Sadaoui 80' (pen.)	Stadium: Indira Gandhi Athletic Stadium; Man of the Match: Seriton Fernandes (Goa)

20 August 2023	NorthEast United	3–1	Downtown Heroes	Guwahati
14.30 IST	Melo 48'; Philippoteaux 52'; Gogoi 78'	Report	P. Bhuiya 9'	Stadium: Indira Gandhi Athletic Stadium; Man of the Match: Romain Philippoteaux (NorthEast United)

=== Quarter-finals ===
24 August 2023	Indian Army	0–1	NorthEast United	Guwahati
18:00 IST		Report	Phalguni Singh 51'	Stadium: Indira Gandhi Athletic Stadium; Man of the Match: Phalguni Singh

=== Semi-final ===
29 August 2023	NorthEast United	2–2 (3–5 p)	East Bengal	Kolkata
18:00 IST	Míchel Zabaco 22'; Phalguni Singh 57'	Report	Naorem Mahesh Singh 77'; Nandhakumar Sekar 90+7'	Stadium: Vivekananda Yuba Bharati Krirangan; Attendance: 21,567

=== Goalscorers ===
Rank	No.	Pos.	Player	League	Durand Cup	Super Cup	Total
1	11	FW	(India) Parthib Gogoi	3	4	0	7
2	26	MF	(India) Phalguni Singh	1	2	0	3
3	4	DF	(Spain) Míchel Zabaco	1	1	0	2
3	10	MF	(France) Romain Philippoteaux	0	2	0	2
3	71	FW	(Brazil) Ibson Melo	1	1	0	2
6	8	FW	(Spain) Néstor Albiach	1	0	0	1
6	12	DF	(India) Asheer Akhtar	1	0	0	1
6	21	FW	(India) Manvir Singh	0	1	0	1
Own goals				1	1	0	2
Totals				9	12	0	21

Source : World Football
