= 2021–22 NorthEast United FC season =

2021–22 season of NorthEast United FC

NorthEast United
2021–22 season
- Owner: John Abraham
- Head Coach: (India) Khalid Jamil
- Stadium: Fatorda Stadium, Goa (Note: Due to the COVID-19 pandemic in India, the 2021–22 Indian Super League would be entirely held in Goa, inside closed doors and NorthEast United FC has been allotted the Fatorda Stadium as their home ground for the season.)
- Indian Super League: 10th
- Super Cup: Cancelled
- Top goalscorer: League: Deshorn Brown (7); All: Deshorn Brown (7)
- Biggest win: NorthEast United 2–0 East Bengal
- Biggest defeat: NorthEast United 0–5 Hyderabad
Home colours	Away colours	Third colours

The 2021–22 season was the club's eight season in Indian Super League since its establishment in 2014. The 2021–22 Indian Super League started from 19 November 2021.

== Season overview ==
The Highlanders are all set rope in Spanish midfielder Hernan Santana and Sehnaj Singh and have extended Khassa Camara’s contract, as reported earlier by Khel Now. The club has also signed Joe Zoherliana, Jestin George, and Mohammed Irshad under the guidance of Khalid Jamil who is set to continue as head coach.

On 27 October 2021, NorthEast United are completed the signing of Australian defender Patrick Flottmann from Sydney FC on a free transfer. The Highlanders first signed South Korean defender Ahn Byung-keon, but couldn’t register him due to some issues.

On 29 October 2021, NorthEast United have completed the signing of Gani Ahmed Nigam.

On 31 October 2021, NorthEast United have completed the signing of Manvir Singh. The striker played for Sudeva FC in the last I-League season and has signed a 3-year-deal with the Highlanders.

=== November ===
On 7 November 2021, NorthEast United FC confirmed the signing of Pragyan Medhi on its social media and various other platforms for the upcoming season. He has signed with NorthEast United on a four–year deal.

On 17 November 2021, NorthEast United announced BKT as their Official Partner for the upcoming season.

On 18 November 2021, NorthEast United announced their partnership with Amrit Cement as their Principal sponsor.

On 19 November, the NorthEast United launched their away-kit and third kit for the upcoming season.

On 20 November 2021, NorthEast United lost 2–4 against Bengaluru FC in their first Indian Super League match of the season. Deshorn Brown and Mathias Coureur are the Goalscorer for the Highlanders.

On 25 November, the NorthEast United played their second match against Kerala Blasters FC, which ended in a 0–0 draw.

On 27 November 2021, NorthEast United announced Health Vit as their Official Nutrition Partner for the upcoming season.

On 29 November 2021, NorthEast United lost 1–2 against Chennaiyin FC in their third Indian Super League match of the season. V.P. Suhair is the Goalscorer for the Highlanders.

=== December ===
On 1 December 2021, NorthEast United announced Akshar Foundation as their Official Partner for the upcoming season.

On 4 December 2021, NorthEast United defeated FC Goa 2–1 at home match. Goal from Rochharzela and Khassa Camara ensured their first victory of the season.

On 10 December 2021, NorthEast United lost 0–1 against Odisha FC at away match.

On 13 December 2021, NorthEast United lost 1–5 against Hyderabad FC. Laldanmawia Ralte is the only goalscorer for the Highlanders.

On 17 December 2021, NorthEast United defeated East Bengal 2–0 at home match. Goals from V.P. Suhair and Patrick Flottman ensured victory for Highlanders.

On 21 December 2021, NorthEast United lost 2–3 against ATK Mohun Bagan. VP Suhair and Mashoor Shereef are the goalscorer for the Highlanders.

On 27 November 2021, the NorthEast United played their home match against Mumbai City, which ended in a 3–3 draw. Deshorn Brown is the Goalscorer for NorthEast United who Scored a hat-trick.

On 29 December 2021, NorthEast United assistant manager Alison Kharsyntiew left the club due to family issue.

=== January ===
On 6 January 2022, NorthEast United sign Indian Super League golden boot winner Marcelinho from Rajasthan United on loan deal. NorthEast United lost 2–3 against Jamshedpur. Brown scored two goals for the Highlanders.

On 13 January 2022, Khelnow confirmed that NorthEast United signed Senegalese defender Zakaria Diallo for the rest of the season. NorthEast United also terminate their contract with Khassa Camara due to his engagements with AFCON that rules him out for a majority of matches in the second phase of Indian Super League.

On 14 January 2022, NorthEast United drew 1–1 with Goa at away match. Hernán scored first for the Highlanders, but Goa equalized shortly after, courtesy of Airam Cabrera.

On 18 January 2022, NorthEast United lost to Odisha 2–0 at home match. Daniel Lalhlimpuia and Aridai Cabrera scored for Odisha.

On 21 January 2022, NorthEast United confirmed the signing of Marco Sahanek on its social media and various other platforms for the rest of the season.

On 22 January 2022, NorthEast United lost to Chennaiyin 1–2 in away match. Danmawia score a goal in 35 minutes for the Highlanders.

On 25 January 2022, NorthEast United drew 1–1 against Mumbai City at away match. Ahmed Jahouh scored a penalty for the Islanders, but Mohammed Irshad equalized the score in 79th minutes.

On 31 January 2022, NorthEast United lost to Hyderabad 0–5 at home match.

=== February ===
On 4 February 2022, NorthEast United lost to Kerala Blasters in 1–2 at away match, with Jorge Pereyra Díaz and Álvaro Vázquez scoring for the Blasters. Mohammed Irshad scored in the last minute for a late consolation.

On 12 February, NorthEast United lost 1–3 against ATK Mohun Bagan.

On 18 February, the Highlanders defeated Bengaluru 2–1. Deshorn Brown and Danmawia scored for Highlanders.

On 25 February, NorthEast United lost 2–3 against Jamshedpur. Danamawia and Marcelinho are the goalscorer for NorthEast United.

On 28 February, NorthEast United drew 1–1 with East Bengal in their last match of the Indian Super League season. Marco Sahanek scored for the Highlanders and Antonio Perošević equalising in the second half for East Bengal.

== Players ==
Current squad of the club:

Squad No.	Name	Nationality	Position(s)	Date of Birt deh (Age)
Goalkeepers
1	Subhasish Roy Chowdhury	(India)	GK	27 September 1986 (age 39)
32	Mirshad Michu	(India)	GK	3 February 1994 (age 32)
33	Sanjiban Ghosh	(India)	GK	6 July 1991 (age 34)
44	Nikhil Deka	(India)	GK	13 October 2002 (age 23)
Defenders
2	Patrick Flottmann	(Australia)	CB	19 April 1997 (age 29)
3	Tondonba Singh	(India)	LB	29 March 1997 (age 29)
4	Provat Lakra	(India)	LB / RB	12 August 1997 (age 28)
5	Gurjinder Kumar	(India)	LB	10 October 1990 (age 35)
16	Mohammed Irshad	(India)	CB / DM	26 December 1994 (age 31)
23	Jestin George	(India)	CB	7 February 1998 (age 28)
24	Joe Zoherliana	(India)	RB	10 May 1999 (age 27)
25	Nabin Rabha	(India)	CB	11 December 1996 (age 29)
66	Mashoor Shereef	(India)	CB	5 January 1993 (age 33)
79	Zakaria Diallo (Winter)	(Senegal) / (France)	CB	13 August 1986 (age 39)
Midfielders
7	Rochharzela	(India)	AM / LM / LW	15 April 1998 (age 28)
8	Imran Khan	(India)	DM / CM / AM / LW	1 March 1995 (age 31)
11	Marco Sahanek (Winter)	(Austria)	AM / LM / RM	27 January 1990 (age 36)
12	Pragyan Medhi	(India)	CM	8 January 2004 (age 22)
13	Emanuel Lalchhanchhuaha	(India)	AM	6 February 2002 (age 24)
14	Hernán Santana (C)	(Spain)	CM / CB	26 August 1990 (age 35)
29	Sehnaj Singh	(India)	CM/DM	19 July 1993 (age 32)
43	Pragyan Gogoi	(India)	CM	25 January 1999 (age 27)
Forward
15	V.P. Suhair	(India)	CF / RW / RM	27 July 1992 (age 33)
17	Laldanmawia Ralte	(India)	LW / CF / RW	19 December 1992 (age 33)
21	Manvir Singh	(India)	CF / RM	15 June 2001 (age 25)
22	Gani Nigam	(India)	LW / LM	1 May 1998 (age 28)
26	Deshorn Brown	(Jamaica)	CF	22 December 1990 (age 35)
27	Lalkhawpuimawia	(India)	CF / LM	8 January 1992 (age 34)
40	Marcelinho (Winter)	(Brazil)	LW / AM	22 June 1987 (age 39)
49	William Lalnunfela	(India)	CF	6 July 1995 (age 30)

== Transfers ==
=== In ===
No.	Pos.	Player	From	Fee	Date	Source
17	FW	(India) Laldanmawia Ralte	Hyderabad	Free transfer	3 September 2021	
29	MF	(India) Sehnaj Singh	East Bengal	Free transfer	6 September 2021	
3	DF	(India) Tondonba Singh	Mumbai City	Undisclosed	7 September 2021	
13	MF	(India) Emanuel Lalchhanchhuaha	Bengaluru	Undisclosed (Note: Fee reported to be ₹10,00,000)	8 September 2021	
24	DF	(India) Joe Zoherliana	Bengaluru	Free transfer	9 September 2021	
14	MF	(Spain) Hernán Santana	(Spain) Sporting de Gijón	Free transfer	10 September 2021	
49	FW	(India) William Lalnunfela	Jamshedpur FC	Free transfer	11 September 2021	
16	DF	(India) Mohammed Irshad	East Bengal	Free transfer	15 September 2021	
23	DF	(India) Jestin George	Gokulam Kerala	Free transfer	16 September 2021	
19	FW	(Martinique) Mathias Coureur	(Turkey) Samsunspor	Free transfer	18 September 2021	
32	GK	(India) Mirshad Michu	East Bengal	Free transfer	1 October 2021	
2	DF	(Australia) Patrick Flottmann	(Australia) Sydney FC	Free transfer	27 October 2021	
22	FW	(India) Gani Nigam	Mohammedan SC	Free transfer	29 October 2021	
21	FW	(India) Manvir Singh	Sudeva FC	Undisclosed	31 October 2021	
12	MF	(India) Pragyan Medhi	Indian Arrows	Free transfer	7 November 2021	
11	MF	(Austria) Marco Sahanek	(Thailand) Nakhon Ratchasima	Free transfer	6 January 2021	
79	DF	(Senegal) Zakaria Diallo	(Kuwait) Al-Shabab	Free transfer	13 January 2021	

=== Contract Extensions ===
No	Player	Position	Contract Till	Ref.
1	(India) Subhasish Roy Chowdhury	GK	2022	
4	(India) Provat Lakra	DF	2022	
26	(Jamaica) Deshorn Brown	FW	2022	
6	(Mauritania) Khassa Camara	MF	2022	
10	(Uruguay) Federico Gallego	MF	2022	

=== Out ===
No.	Pos.	Player	To	Fee	Date	Source
20	WF	(Portugal) Luís Machado	(Poland) Radomiak	Free transfer	24 June 2021	
19	DF	(Belgium) Benjamin Lambot	(Belgium) RFC Liège	Free transfer	2 July 2021	
12	DF	(India) Ashutosh Mehta	ATK Mohun Bagan FC	Free transfer	5 July 2021	
29	DF	(India) Nim Dorjee Tamang	Hyderabad	Undisclosed	30 July 2021	
31	GK	(India) Gurmeet Singh	Hyderabad	Free transfer	30 July 2021	
2	DF	(India) Wayne Vaz	Mohammedan SC	Free transfer	2 August 2021	
45	MF	(India) Lalengmawia	Mumbai City	₹19.04m	13 August 2021	
33	DF	(India) Rakesh Pradhan	Mohammedan SC	Free transfer	15 August 2021	
9	FW	(Ghana) Kwesi Appiah	(England) Crawley Town	Free transfer	16 August 2021	
11	FW	(Guinea) Idrissa Sylla	–	Free transfer	–	
50	FW	(India) Britto PM	Released		28 August 2021	
16	DF	(Australia) Dylan Fox	FC Goa	₹2.82m	31 August	
54	DF	(India) Ponif Vaz	Real Kashmir	Undisclosed	31 August	
7	FW	(India) Ninthoinganba Meetei	Chennaiyin FC	Undisclosed	31 August 2021	
19	FW	(Martinique) Mathias Coureur	Released		7 January 2022	
6	MF	(Mauritania) Khassa Camara	Free agent	Contract termination	13 January 2022	

=== Loans in ===
No	Position	Player	Loaned from	Fee	Date	On loan until	Source
40	FW	(Brazil) Marcelinho	Rajasthan United	None	6 January 2022	End of Season	

== Competitions ==
=== Pre-season and friendlies ===
27 October 2021 Friendly	NorthEast United	0-2	Jamshedpur	Panjim
16:00 IST (UTC+05:30)		Report	Murray 5', 30'	Stadium: Don Bosco Ground

8 November 2021 Friendly	NorthEast United	1–1	Hyderabad	Goa
16:00 IST	Mathias	Report	Narzary

=== Indian Super League ===
Pos	Team	Pld	W	D	L	GF	GA	GD	Pts
7	Odisha	20	6	5	9	31	43	−12	23
8	Chennaiyin	20	5	5	10	17	35	−18	20
9	Goa	20	4	7	9	29	35	−6	19
10	NorthEast United	20	3	5	12	25	43	−18	14
11	East Bengal	20	1	8	11	18	36	−18	11

Source: Indian Super League
Rules for classification: 1) points; 2) head-to-head points; 3) head-to-head goal difference; 4) head-to-head goals scored; 5) goal difference; 6) number of goals scored; 7) fair play ranking; 8) drawing of lots

==== Result summary ====
Overall								Home						Away					
Pld	W	D	L	GF	GA	GD	Pts	W	D	L	GF	GA	GD	W	D	L	GF	GA	GD
20	3	5	12	25	43	−18	14	3	2	5	14	20	−6	0	3	7	11	23	−12

==== Results by round ====
Round	1	2	3	4	5	6	7	8	9	10	11	12	13	14	15	16	17	18	19	20
Ground	A	H	H	H	A	A	H	H	H	A	A	H	A	A	H	A	H	A	H	A
Result	L	D	L	W	L	L	W	L	D	L	D	L	L	D	L	L	L	W	L	D
Position	11	9	9	8	9	10	7	9	9	10	10	11	11	10	10	11	11	10	10	10

Updated to match(es) played on 28 February 2022. Source: indiansuperleague.com
A = Away; H = Home; W = Win; D = Draw; L = Loss

==== Matches ====
The season fixtures for the first 10 matches were released on 13 September. NorthEast United began their campaign against Bengaluru FC on 20 November 2021.

Win Draw Loss

20 November 2021 1	Bengaluru	4–2	NorthEast United	Bambolim
19:30 IST	Silva 14'; Shereef 22' (o.g.); Rane 42'; Silva (yellow card) 45'; Ibara 82'	Report	Brown 17'; Coureur 25'; Kumar (yellow card) 67'	Stadium: GMC Athletic Stadium; Attendance: Closed doors Referee: Rahul Kumar Gupta; Man of the Match: Udanta Singh (BFC)

25 November 2021 2	NorthEast United	0–0	Kerala Blasters	Margao, Goa
19:30 IST	Kumar (yellow card) 22'; Lakra (yellow card) 87'	Report	Sipović (yellow card) 26'	Stadium: Fatorda Stadium; Attendance: Closed doors Referee: Aditya Purkayastha; Man of the Match: Hernán Santana (NEUFC)

29 November 2021 3	NorthEast United	1–2	Chennaiyin	Margao, Goa
19:30 IST	Camara (yellow card) 35'; Flottmann (yellow card) 38'; Suhair 50'; Shereef (yellow card) 78'	Report	Chhangte 41'; Singh (yellow card) 55'; Thapa 74'	Stadium: Fatorda Stadium; Attendance: Closed doors Referee: Ashwin; Man of the Match: Lallianzuala Chhangte (CFC)

4 December 2021 4	NorthEast United	2–1	FC Goa	Margao, Goa
19:30 IST	Lakra (yellow card) 6'; Charra 10'; Camara (yellow card) 39'; Subhasish (yellow card) 89'; Camara 90+3'	Report	Jeauraj 13'	Stadium: Fatorda Stadium; Attendance: Closed doors Referee: Rahul Kumar Gupta; Man of the Match: Hernán Santana (NEUFC)

10 December 2021 5	Odisha	1–0	NorthEast United	Vasco da Gama, Goa
19:30 IST	Rai (yellow card) 68'; Jonathas 81'; Aridai (yellow card) 90'	Report		Stadium: Tilak Maidan Stadium; Attendance: Closed doors Referee: Senthil Nathan S Man of the Match: Jonathas de Jesus (BFC)

13 December 2021 6	Hyderabad	5–1	NorthEast United	Bambolim
19:30 IST	Sana 12'; Ogbeche 27', 78'; Tavora (yellow card) 82'; Kattimani (yellow card) 90'; Jadhav 90'; Siverio 90+4'	Report	Flottmann (yellow card) 6'; Danmawia 43'; Santana (yellow card) 80'; Shereef (yellow card) 90+2'	Stadium: GMC Athletic Stadium; Attendance: Closed doors Referee: Ashwin; Man of the Match: Asish Rai (HFC)

17 December 2021 7	NorthEast United	2–0	East Bengal	Margao, Goa
19:30 IST	Rochharzela (yellow card) 41'; Lalkhawpuimawia (yellow card) 46'; Suhair 60'; Flottmann 68'; Danmawia (yellow card) 90+4'	Report	Naorem (yellow card) 45+2'; Perošević (red card) 90+2'	Stadium: Fatorda Stadium; Attendance: 0 (Note: Match was played behind closed doors due to government restrictions regarding the COVID-19 pandemic in India.); Referee: Rahul Kumar Gupta; Man of the Match: Khassa Camara (NEUFC)

21 December 2021 8	NorthEast United	2–3	ATK Mohun Bagan	Fatorda, Goa
19:30 IST	Suhair 2'; Shereef 87'	Report	Colaco 45+2'; Boumous 52', 76'	Stadium: Fatorda Stadium; Attendance: 0 Referee: Harish Kundu; Man of the Match: Liston Colaco (ATKMB)

27 December 2021 9	NorthEast United	3–3	Mumbai City	Fatorda, Goa
19:30 IST	Gogoi (yellow card) 18'; Brown 29', 55', 80'; Hernán (yellow card) 90+5'	Report	Angulo 33', 52'; Singh 40', (yellow card) 71'	Stadium: Fatorda Stadium; Attendance: 0 Referee: Rowan Arumughan; Man of the Match: Deshorn Brown (NEUFC)

6 January 2022 10	Jamshedpur	3–2	NorthEast United	Bambolim
19:30 IST	Murray 44'; Boris 56'; Pandita 90+3'	Report	Brown 4', 90+1'; Shereef (yellow card) 70'	Stadium: GMC Athletic Stadium; Attendance: 0 Referee: Rowan Arumughan; Man of the Match: Ishan Pandita (NEUFC)

14 January 2022 11	Goa	v	NorthEast United	Bambolim
19:30 IST				Stadium: GMC Athletic Stadium; Attendance: 0

18 January 2022 12	NorthEast United	v	Odisha	Fatorda, Goa
19:30 IST				Stadium: Fatorda Stadium; Attendance: 0

22 January 2022 13	Chennaiyin	v	NorthEast United	Fatorda, Goa
19:30 IST				Stadium: Fatorda Stadium; Attendance: 0

25 January 2022 14	Mumbai City	v	NorthEast United	Fatorda, Goa
19:30 IST				Stadium: Fatorda Stadium; Attendance: 0

31 January 2022 15	NorthEast United	0–5	Hyderabad	Margao
19:30 IST	Sahanek (yellow card) 26'; Khan (yellow card) 45+1'; Kumar (yellow card) 59'; Marcelinho (yellow card) 74'; Diallo (yellow card) 90+4'	Report	Ogbeche 3', 60'; Mishra 45+3'; Poojari 84'; García 88'	Stadium: Fatorda Stadium; Referee: R Venkatesh; Man of the Match: Ogbeche (HFC)

4 February 2022 16	Kerala Blasters	2–1	NorthEast United	Vasco da Gama, Goa
19:30 IST	Adhikari (yellow card) 47' (yellow-red card) 70'; Díaz 62' (yellow card) 67'; Vázquez 82'	Report	Gogoi (yellow card) 15'; Roy (yellow card) 55'; Lakra (yellow card) 74'; Sahanek (yellow card) 80'; Irshad 90+6'	Stadium: Tilak Maidan Stadium; Attendance: 0 Referee: Pratik Mondal; Man of the Match: Álvaro Vázquez (KBFC)
Note: Match was rescheduled.

12 February 2022 17	ATK Mohun Bagan	3–1	NorthEast United	Fatorda, Goa
19:30 IST	Kauko 22'; Colaco 45'; M Singh 52'	Report	Suhair 17'; Kumar (yellow card) 44'; Santana (yellow card) 68'	Stadium: PJN Stadium; Attendance: 0 Referee: Ramachandran Venkatesh; Man of the Match: Joni Kauko (ATK Mohun Bagan)
Note: Match was rescheduled.

18 February 2022 18	Northeast United	2–1	Bengaluru	Margao
19:30 IST	Lakra (yellow card) 23'; Irshad (yellow card) 23'; Santana (yellow card) 62'; Brown 74'; Danmawia 80'; T. Singh (yellow card) 90'	Report	Farooq (yellow card) 54'; Silva 66' (yellow card) 90'	Stadium: Fatorda Stadium; Attendance: 0 Referee: R Venkatesh; Man of the Match: Joe Zoherliana (NEUFC)
Note: Match was rescheduled.

27 February 2022 19	NorthEast United	v	Jamshedpur
19:30 IST				Attendance: 0

28 February 2022 20	East Bengal	1–1	NorthEast United	Vasco da Gama, Goa
19:30 IST	Perošević 55'	Report	Khan (yellow card) 24'; Sahanek 45'; Diallo (yellow card) 58'	Stadium: Tilak Maidan Stadium; Attendance: 0 Referee: Tejas Nagvenkar; Man of the Match: Joe Zoherliana (NEUFC)
Note: Match was rescheduled.

== Statistics ==
=== Squad statistics ===
As of 28 February 2022

No.	Pos	Nat	Player	Total		Indian Super League	
No.	Pos	Nat	Player	Apps	Goals	Apps	Goals
Goalkeepers
1	GK	(India) IND	Subhasish Roy Chowdhury	10	0	9+1	0
32	GK	(India) IND	Mirshad Michu	11	0	11	0
33	GK	(India) IND	Sanjiban Ghosh	0	0	0	0
44	GK	(India) IND	Nikhil Deka	0	0	0	0
Defenders
2	DF	(Australia) AUS	Patrick Flottmann	15	1	13+2	1
3	DF	(India) IND	Tondonba Singh	9	0	3+6	0
4	DF	(India) IND	Provat Lakra	16	0	15+1	0
5	DF	(India) IND	Gurjinder Kumar	16	0	16	0
16	DF	(India) IND	Mohammed Irshad	14	2	9+5	2
23	DF	(India) IND	Jestin George	5	0	2+3	0
24	DF	(India) IND	Joe Zoherliana	9	0	6+3	0
25	DF	(India) IND	Nabin Rabha	0	0	0	0
66	DF	(India) IND	Mashoor Shereef	15	1	11+4	1
79	DF	(Senegal) SEN	Zakaria Diallo	7	0	7	0
Midfielders
7	MF	(India) IND	Rochharzela	11	1	5+6	1
8	MF	(India) IND	Imran Khan	17	0	13+4	0
11	MF	(Austria) AUT	Marco Sahanek	7	1	6+1	1
12	MF	(India) IND	Pragyan Medhi	0	0	0	0
14	MF	(Spain) ESP	Hernán Santana	17	1	17	1
29	MF	(India) IND	Sehnaj Singh	10	0	8+2	0
43	MF	(India) IND	Pragyan Gogoi	13	0	9+4	0
Forwards
15	FW	(India) IND	V.P. Suhair	19	4	19	4
17	FW	(India) IND	Laldanmawia Ralte	13	4	5+8	4
21	FW	(India) IND	Manvir Singh	5	0	0+5	0
22	FW	(India) IND	Gani Nigam	6	0	0+6	0
26	FW	(Jamaica) JAM	Deshorn Brown	12	7	9+3	7
27	FW	(India) IND	Lalkhawpuimawia	12	0	5+7	0
40	FW	(Brazil) BRA	Marcelinho	8	1	4+4	1
49	FW	(India) IND	William Lalnunfela	2	0	0+2	0
Players who left the club during the season
13	MF	(India) IND	Emanuel Lalchhanchhuaha	0	0	0	0
10	MF	(Uruguay) URU	Federico Gallego	1	0	1	0
6	MF	(Mauritania) MTN	Khassa Camara	7	1	7	1
19	FW	(Martinique) MTQ	Mathias Coureur	10	1	9+1	1

=== Goalscorers ===
Rank	No.	Pos.	Player	League	Super Cup	Total
1	26	FW	(Jamaica) Deshorn Brown	7	0	7
2	15	FW	(India) V.P. Suhair	4	0	4
2	17	FW	(India) Laldanmawia Ralte	4	0	4
4	16	DF	(India) Mohammed Irshad	2	0	2
5	19	FW	(Martinique) Mathias Coureur	1	0	1
5	7	MF	(India) Rochharzela	1	0	1
5	6	MF	(Mauritania) Khassa Camara	1	0	1
5	2	DF	(Australia) Patrick Flottmann	1	0	1
5	66	DF	(India) Mashoor Shereef	1	0	1
5	14	MF	(Spain) Hernan Santana	1	0	1
5	11	FW	(Austria) Marco Sahanek	1	0	1
5	40	FW	(Brazil) Marcelinho	1	0	1
Totals				25	0	25

Last updated: 28 February 2022.
Source: Fbref

=== Hat-tricks ===
Player	Against	Result	Date	Competition	Ref
(Jamaica) Deshorn Brown	Mumbai City	3–3 (H)	27 December 2021	Indian Super League	

(H) – Home; (A) – Away

=== Assist ===
Rank	No.	Pos.	Name	League	Super Cup	Total
1	8	MF	(India) Imran Khan	3	0	3
2	19	FW	(Martinique) Mathias Coureur	2	0	2
2	15	FW	(India) V.P. Suhair	2	0	2
2	66	DF	(India) Mashoor Shereef	2	0	2
2	17	MF	(Spain) Hernan Santana	2	0	2
3	26	FW	(Jamaica) Deshorn Brown	1	0	1
3	17	FW	(India) Laldanmawia Ralte	1	0	1
3	2	DF	(Australia) Patrick Flottmann	1	0	1
3	40	DF	(Brazil) Marcelinho	1	0	1
3	43	MF	(India) Pragyan Gogoi	1	0	1
3	24	DF	(India) Joe Zoherliana	1	0	1
Totals				17	0	17

Last updated: 28 February 2022.
Source: Fbref

=== Clean sheets ===
Rank	No.	Name	League	Super Cup	Total
1	1	(India) Subhasish Roy Chowdhury	1	0	1
1	32	(India) Mirshad Michu	1	0	1
Totals			2	0	2

Last updated: 28 February 2022.
Source: Fbref

=== Disciplinary record ===
No.	Pos.	Nation	Name	League			Super Cup			Total		
No.	Pos.	Nation	Name	Yellow card	Second yellow card	Red card	Yellow card	Second yellow card	Red card	Yellow card	Second yellow card	Red card
14	MF	(Spain)	Hernán Santana	7	0	0	0	0	0	7	0	0
4	DF	(India)	Provat Lakra	5	0	0	0	0	0	5	0	0
5	DF	(India)	Gurjinder Kumar	5	0	0	0	0	0	5	0	0
66	DF	(India)	Mashoor Shereef	4	0	0	0	0	0	4	0	0
40	FW	(Brazil)	Marcelinho	3	0	0	0	0	0	3	0	0
79	DF	(Senegal)	Zakaria Diallo	3	0	0	0	0	0	3	0	0
8	MF	(India)	Imran Khan	2	0	0	0	0	0	2	0	0
16	DF	(India)	Mohammed Irshad	2	0	0	0	0	0	2	0	0
6	MF	(Mauritania)	Khassa Camara	2	0	0	0	0	0	2	0	0
2	DF	(Australia)	Patrick Flottmann	2	0	0	0	0	0	2	0	0
15	FW	(India)	V.P. Suhair	2	0	0	0	0	0	2	0	0
1	GK	(India)	Subhasish Roy Chowdhury	2	0	0	0	0	0	2	0	0
43	MF	(India)	Pragyan Gogoi	2	0	0	0	0	0	2	0	0
11	MF	(Austria)	Marco Sahanek	2	0	0	0	0	0	2	0	0
7	MF	(India)	Rochharzela	1	0	0	0	0	0	1	0	0
27	FW	(India)	Lalkhawpuimawia	1	0	0	0	0	0	1	0	0
17	FW	(India)	Laldanmawia Ralte	1	0	0	0	0	0	1	0	0
29	MF	(India)	Sehnaj Singh	1	0	0	0	0	0	1	0	0

=== Injury record ===
N	P	Nat.	Name	Type	Status	Source	Match	Inj. Date	Ret. Date
8	MF	(India)	Imran Khan	unknown injury			in training	Pre-Season	4 December 2021
13	MF	(India)	Emanuel Lalchhanchhuaha	leg injury			in training	Pre-Season	Pre-Season
49	FW	(India)	William Lalnunfela	Unknown injury			vs Bengaluru	20 November 2021	27 December 2021
26	FW	(Jamaica)	Deshorn Brown	hamstring injury			vs Kerala Blasters	25 November 2021	4 December 2021
10	MF	(Uruguay)	Federico Gallego	left knee injury		thenewsmill.com	vs Chennaiyin	29 November 2021	Unknown
26	FW	(Jamaica)	Deshorn Brown	hamstring injury			vs Odisha	10 December 2021	27 December 2021
7	MF	(India)	Rochharzela	shoulder injury			vs Goa	14 January 2022	Pre-Season
26	FW	(Jamaica)	Deshorn Brown	hamstring injury			vs Goa	14 January 2022	4 February 2022

- Player is injured
- Player has recovered from injury
Last updated: 28 February 2022
Source: NorthEast United FC

== See also ==
- NorthEast United FC
- Indian Super League
- 2021–22 Indian Super League
