= Thoi Singh Huidrom =

Indian footballer (born 2004)

Thoi Singh
Personal information
- Full name: Thoi Singh Huidrom
- Date of birth: 4 May 2004 (age 22)
- Place of birth: Manipur, India
- Position: Winger

Team information
- Current team: Inter Kashi
- Number: 20

Youth career
- 2015–2021: Young Champs Academy
- 2021–2023: Bengaluru Youth
- 2023–2025: NorthEast United Youth

Senior career*
| Years | Team | Apps | (Gls) |
| 2022–2023 | Bengaluru B | 17 | (6) |
| 2023–2026 | NorthEast United | 28 | (0) |
| 2026– | Inter Kashi | 2 | (1) |

International career^{‡}
| 2025– | India U23 | 1 | (0) |
- * Club domestic league appearances and goals as of 17 October 2026 ‡ National team caps and goals as of 10 October 2025 (UTC)

Thoi Singh Huidrom (Meitei: Huidrom Thoi Singh, born 4 May 2004) is an Indian professional footballer who plays as a forward for Indian Super League club Inter Kashi.

== Club career ==
=== Bengaluru ===
Since 2015, Thoi Singh was trained at the Young Champs Academy. He played for five years at the academy before joining Bengaluru FC. From 2021 to 2023 he represented the youth team of Bengaluru in the Development League. He won the 2022 and 2023 Development League with Bengaluru. He was also part of the main team of Bengaluru for the 2022–23 Indian Super League but did not play any match in the top-tier league. However, he represented Bengaluru reserve team in six matches at the 2022–23 I-League 2nd Division, the third-tier league of Indian football. He scored his first senior goal in this season.

=== NorthEast United ===
For the 2023–24 season he signed Indian Super League (ISL) club NorthEast United FC. In the same season he won the 2024 Durand Cup with NorthEast United. For the 2023–24 season he played thirteen matches for the club in the ISL. NorthEast United reached the playoffs of the 2024–25 Indian Super League. Though he is a part of the main team of NorthEast United, he also played in the Development league for the club from 2023 to 2025.

== International career ==
In May 2025, India under-23 head coach Naushad Moosa listed Thoi Singh in the 29-members probable squad for two friendlies that will be held in Tajikistan in June 2025.

== Career statistics ==
=== Club ===
As of 22 May 2025

Appearances and goals by club, season and competition
| Club | Season | League | | | Super Cup | | Durand Cup | | Continental | | Total | |
| Club | Season | Division | Apps | Goals | Apps | Goals | Apps | Goals | Apps | Goals | Apps | Goal |
|---|---|---|---|---|---|---|---|---|---|---|---|---|
| Bengaluru B | 2022–23 | I-League 2 | 6 | 1 | – | | 3 | 1 | – | | 9 | 2 |
| Bengaluru B | Total | | 6 | 1 | – | | 3 | 1 | – | | 9 | 2 |
| NorthEast United | 2023–24 | Indian Super League | 5 | 0 | 1 | 0 | 1 | 0 | 0 | 0 | 7 | 0 |
| NorthEast United | 2024–25 | Indian Super League | 13 | 0 | 2 | 0 | 5 | 2 | 0 | 0 | 20 | 2 |
| NorthEast United | Total | | 18 | 0 | 3 | 0 | 6 | 2 | 0 | 0 | 27 | 2 |
| Career total | | | 24 | 1 | 3 | 0 | 9 | 3 | 0 | 0 | 36 | 4 |

== Honours ==
Bengaluru FC B

- Development League: 2022, 2023

NorthEast United FC

- Durand Cup: 2024, 2025
