= Parthib Gogoi =

Indian footballer (born 2003)

Personal information
- Full name: Parthib Sundar Gogoi
- Date of birth: 30 January 2003 (age 23)
- Place of birth: Sivasagar, Assam, India
- Height: 1.75 m (5 ft 9 in)
- Position: Forward

Team information
- Current team: NorthEast United
- Number: 11

Youth career
- Ozone

Senior career*
Years	Team	Apps	(Gls)
2019–2022	Indian Arrows	28	(3)
2022–	NorthEast United	63	(11)

International career^{‡}
2022	India U20	8	(5)
2023–2025	India U23	12	(1)
2026–	India	1	(0)
- * Club domestic league appearances and goals as of 17:05, 20 March 2026 (UTC) ‡ National team caps and goals as of 23:59, 6 June 2026 (UTC)

Parthib Sundar Gogoi (Assamese: পার্থিব সুন্দৰ গগৈ; born 30 January 2003) is an Indian professional footballer who plays as a forward for Indian Super League club NorthEast United and the India national team.

== Club career ==
=== Indian Arrows ===
Prior to the 2020–21 season, Parthib was announced as part of I-League side Indian Arrows, the development team for the All India Football Federation. He scored a goal against Aizawl.

=== NorthEast United ===
On 5 September, NorthEast United signed Parthib from Indian Arrows on a multiyear deal. On 4 August, Gogoi scored his first senior hat-trick against Shillong Lajong in the Durand Cup, in a 4–0 win.

On 6 October 2023, Gogoi scored the opener from a long ranger in their 1–1 tie with debutant Punjab at the Jawaharlal Nehru Stadium in Delhi.

== International career ==
Gogoi was part of Shanmugam Venkatesh managed India U20 national team during their campaign in 2022 SAFF U-20 Championship. In that edition, they clinched title defeating Bangladesh 5–2 in final. He also made it to the team's 2023 AFC U-20 Asian Cup qualification squad.

== Personal life ==
Gogoi hails from Assam's Nazira, a town situated in the district of Sivasagar. His elder brother Pragyan Gogoi is also a professional footballer.

== Career statistics ==
=== Club ===
As of match played 24 April 2025

Appearances and goals by club, season and competition
Club	Season	League			Cup		Continental		Other		Total	
Club	Season	Division	Apps	Goals	Apps	Goals	Apps	Goals	Apps	Goals	Apps	Goals
Indian Arrows	2020–21	I-League	11	1	0	0	—		—		11	1
Indian Arrows	2021–22	I-League	17	2	0	0	—		2 (Note: Appearance(s) in IFA Shield)	0	19	2
Indian Arrows	Total		28	3	0	0	—		2	0	30	3
NorthEast United	2022–23	Indian Super League	18	3	1	0	—		—		19	3
NorthEast United	2023–24	Indian Super League	17	5	3	1	—		4 (Note: Appearance(s) in Durand Cup)	4	24	10
NorthEast United	2024–25	Indian Super League	22	2	1	0	—		4	1	27	3
NorthEast United	Total		57	10	5	1	—		8	5	70	16
Career total			85	13	5	1	—		10	5	100	19

=== International ===
As of 5 June 2026

National team	Year	Apps	Goals
India	2026	1	0
Total		1	0

== Honours ==
India U20

- SAFF U-20 Championship: 2022

NorthEast United

- Durand Cup: 2024, 2025
