= Alfred Lalruotsang =

Indian footballer

Alfred Lalruotsang Hmar
Personal information
- Date of birth: 26 June 2003 (age 23)
- Place of birth: Hmarkhawlien, Cachar, Assam, India
- Height: 1.77 m (5 ft 9 1/2 in)
- Position: Forward

Team information
- Current team: NorthEast United
- Number: 30

Youth career
- Bengaluru
- 2019: NorthEast United

Senior career*
Years	Team	Apps	(Gls)
2020	NorthEast United	1	(0)
2021–22	FC Areacode	?	(?)
2022	Lenruol FC	?	(?)
2022–	NorthEast United B	2	(4)
2022–	NorthEast United	1	(0)
- * Club domestic league appearances and goals as of 5 September 2022

Alfred Lalruotsang Hmar (born 26 June 2003) is an Indian professional footballer who plays as a forward for Indian Super League club NorthEast United. He is the youngest-ever player to play in the Indian Super League at the age of 16 years and 240 days.

== Club career ==
=== NorthEast United ===
Lalroutsang made his debut for NorthEast United in February 2020 after multiple injuries to the starting squad, becoming the youngest-ever player to play in the ISL at the age of 16 years. In 2022 Durand Cup, Alfred plays 4 games for NorthEast United B and provided one assist in the end of the tournament. Due to his impressive performance Alfred is promoted to the senior team for 2022–23 Indian Super League season.

== Career statistics ==
As of match played 2 September 2022

Appearances and goals by club, season and competition
Club	Season	League			Cup		Continental		Other		Total	
Club	Season	Division	Apps	Goals	Apps	Goals	Apps	Goals	Apps	Goals	Apps	Goals
NorthEast United	2019–20	Indian Super League	1	0	—		—		—		1	0
NorthEast United B	2022	GSA C Division	2	4	4 (Note: Appearance(s) in Durand Cup)	0	—		—		6	4
NorthEast United	2022–23	Indian Super League	0	0	—		—		—		0	0
Career total			3	4	4	0	0	0	0	0	7	4

== Honours ==
NorthEast United B

- GSA C Division: 2022
