= Mirshad Michu =

Indian footballer

Personal information
- Full name: Mirshad Koottappunna
- Date of birth: 3 February 1994 (age 32)
- Place of birth: Kasaragod, Kerala, India
- Height: 1.81 m (5 ft 11 in)
- Position: Goalkeeper

Team information
- Current team: Calicut
- Number: 32

Youth career
- Kerala

Senior career*
Years	Team	Apps	(Gls)
2016−2017	FC Bardez Goa	29	(0)
2017	→ Gokulam Kerala (loan)	32	(0)
2017−2021	East Bengal	11	(0)
2021−2025	NorthEast United	40	(0)
2025−2026	Diamond Harbour	0	(0)
2026−	Calicut	1	(0)
- * Club domestic league appearances and goals as of 21:45, 26 September 2026 (UTC)

Mirshad Koottappunna (born 3 February 1994), commonly known as Mirshad Michu, is an Indian professional footballer who plays as a goalkeeper for Calicut.

== Career ==
=== East Bengal ===
While Playing in KPL for Gokulam Kerala, Mirshad was spotted by East Bengal scout Alvito D'Cunha and signed up for the 2017-18 season. In East Bengal, He joined with other Kerala Players Ubaid CK, Suhair V P, Jobi Justin who were also part the squad.

=== NorthEast United ===
On 1 October 2021, NorthEast United confirmed the signing of Mirshad on its social media and various other platforms for the 2021–22 Indian Super League season. He made his debut for the club on 10 December, in their 0–1 defeat to Odisha. Mirshad kept his first clean-sheet on 17 December against the East Bengal in a 2–0 victory.

== Career statistics ==
=== Club ===
As of 8 March 2025

Club	Season	League			Cup		Continental		Total	
Club	Season	Division	Apps	Goals	Apps	Goals	Apps	Goals	Apps	Goals
East Bengal	2017–18	I-League	3	0	0	0	—		3	0
East Bengal	2018–19	I-League	0	0	0	0	—		0	0
East Bengal	2019–20	I-League	7	0	2 (Note: Appearance(s) in Durand Cup)	0	—		9	0
East Bengal	2020–21	Indian Super League	1	0	0	0	—		1	0
East Bengal	Total		11	0	2	0	0	0	13	0
NorthEast United	2021–22	Indian Super League	11	0	—		—		11	0
NorthEast United	2022–23	Indian Super League	10	0	4 (Note: Appearance(s) in Super Cup)	0	—		14	0
NorthEast United	2023–24	Indian Super League	18	0	5	0	—		23	0
NorthEast United	2024–25	Indian Super League	1	0	1	0	—		2	0
NorthEast United	Total		40	0	10	0	0	0	50	0
Career total			51	0	12	0	0	0	63	0

== Honours ==
East Bengal

- Calcutta Football League: 2017–18

NorthEast United

- Durand Cup: 2024
