= Joe Zoherliana =

Indian footballer

Personal information
- Full name: Joe Zoherliana
- Date of birth: 10 May 1999 (age 27)
- Place of birth: Lengpui, Mizoram, India
- Height: 1.71 m (5 ft 7 1/2 in)
- Position: Right back

Team information
- Current team: Mohammedan

Youth career
- Shillong Lajong
- Pune City B

Senior career*
Years	Team	Apps	(Gls)
2018–2020	Aizawl	17	(2)
2020–2021	Bengaluru	0	(0)
2021–2023	NorthEast United	21	(0)
2023–2024	Aizawl	16	(4)
2024–	Mohammedan		
- * Club domestic league appearances and goals as of 21:33, 18 March 2024 (UTC)

Joe Zoherliana (born 10 May 1999) is an Indian professional footballer who plays as a defender for Indian Super League club Mohammedan.

== Club career ==
He was born to Zohmangaiha. Joe started to play locally in Mizoram before moving to the Shillong Lajong F.C. Academy in Meghalaya, where he also made his senior debut in the Shillong Premier League. Thereafter he returned to his home state to play for Mizoram Premier League side Chanmari F.C. of Aizawl before joining Indian Super League outfit FC Pune City.

He was signed by Aizawl F.C. in 2018. He made his professional debut for the Aizawl against East Bengal F.C. on 14 November 2018, he started and played full match as Aizawl won 3–2.

=== NorthEast United ===
On 9 September 2021, NorthEast United announced that they had completed the signing of Joe on a three-year deal. He made his debut against Goa on 4 December, which ended in a 2–1 win as a substitute for Provat Lakra in the 17th minute of the game. He won the Hero of the match at two matches for the club in the 2021–22 season. He ended the season as one of the best NorthEast player in that season, in which the club only managed 14 points from 20 matches. At the last match of NorthEast United in 2021–22 season, his father was the 12th man to support the club.

== Career statistics ==
=== Club ===
As of 18 March 2024

Club	Season	League			Cup		AFC		Total	
Club	Season	Division	Apps	Goals	Apps	Goals	Apps	Goals	Apps	Goals
Aizawl	2018–19	I-League	2	1	0	0	—		2	1
Aizawl	2019–20	I-League	15	1	0	0	—		15	1
Aizawl	Total		17	2	0	0	0	0	17	2
Bengaluru	2020–21	Indian Super League	0	0	0	0	—		0	0
NorthEast United	2021–22	Indian Super League	9	0	—		—		9	0
NorthEast United	2022–23	Indian Super League	12	0	4 (Note: Appearance(s) in Durand Cup) (Note: Appearance(s) in Super Cup)	0	—		16	0
NorthEast United	Total		21	0	4	0	0	0	25	0
Aizawl	2023–24	I-League	16	4	0	0	—		16	4
Career total			54	6	4	0	0	0	58	6
