= Imran Khan (footballer) =

Indian footballer

Personal information
- Date of birth: 1 March 1995 (age 31)
- Place of birth: Manipur, India
- Height: 1.70 m (5 ft 7 in)
- Position: Winger

Team information
- Current team: Odisha

Senior career*
Years	Team	Apps	(Gls)
2013–2016	Mohammedan	2	(0)
2018–2020	Goa	0	(0)
2019	→ Gokulam Kerala (loan)	9	(0)
2019	→ Mohun Bagan (loan)	0	(0)
2020	NEROCA	11	(1)
2020–2023	NorthEast United	37	(2)
2023–2025	Jamshedpur	43	(2)
2026	Chennaiyin	10	(1)
2026–	Odisha	0	(0)
- * Club domestic league appearances and goals as of 10:00, 28 January 2026 (UTC)

Imran Khan (born 1 March 1995) is an Indian professional footballer who plays as a forward for Indian Super League club Odisha.

== Club career ==
Born in Manipur, Khan began his career with Mohammedan in the I-League. He made his professional debut for the club on 15 December 2013 in a league match against Churchill Brothers. He came on as a 90th-minute substitute for Ashim Biswas as Mohammedan lost 3–1.

In 2017, Khan joined I-League 2nd Division side Fateh Hyderabad. After impressing for Hyderabad during the 2017–18 season, Khan joined Indian Super League club Goa. However, due to the Khan struggling to find time with Goa's first-team, he joined I-League club Gokulam Kerala on loan in January 2019. He made his debut for the club on 4 January 2019 in Gokulam's match against Chennai City. He came on as a 67th-minute substitute for Rajesh S as Gokulam Kerala lost 3–2.

=== NEROCA ===
On 7 January 2020, it was announced that Khan had joined I-League club NEROCA. Khan made his debut for the club on 14 January 2020 in a 1–0 victory against Real Kashmir.

=== NorthEast United ===
In 2020, Imran was signed by NorthEast United on a two-year deal. He scored his first goal in Indian Super League and for the club against Chennaiyin FC on 18 February 2021. In the 2020–21 season he made six appearances for NorthEast United and scored a goal.

He played his first match of the 2021–22 Indian Super League season on 4 December 2021, which ended in a 2–1 win as a substitute for Rochharzela in the 95th minute of the game. In the end of the season he made 17 appearances for the club and provides three assists and became the highest assist provider in the 2021–22 season for NorthEast United.

== Legacy ==
Bosnian footballer Enes Sipović's wife Nejra gave birth of a baby boy on 27 May 2022, and decided to name their newborn after the Highlanders' midfielder Imran, having watched him play on television during the 2021–22 ISL season.

== Career statistics ==
=== Club ===
As of 9 April 2024

Club	Season	League			Cup		AFC		Total	
Club	Season	Division	Apps	Goals	Apps	Goals	Apps	Goals	Apps	Goals
Goa	2017–18	Indian Super League	0	0	0	0	—		0	0
Gokulam Kerala (loan)	2018–19	I-League	9	0	0	0	—		9	0
Mohun Bagan (loan)	2019–20	I-League	0	0	2 (Note: Appearance(s) in Durand Cup)	0	—		2	0
NEROCA	2019–20	I-League	11	1	0	0	—		11	1
NorthEast United	2020–21	Indian Super League	6	1	—		—		6	1
NorthEast United	2021–22	Indian Super League	17	0	—		—		17	0
NorthEast United	2022–23	Indian Super League	14	1	1 (Note: Appearance(s) in Super Cup)	0	—		15	1
NorthEast United	Total		37	2	1	0	0	0	38	2
Jamshedpur	2023–24	Indian Super League	19	2	4	0	—		23	2
Career total			76	5	7	0	0	0	83	5
