= Lalkhawpuimawia =

Indian footballer

Personal information
- Date of birth: 22 January 1992 (age 34)
- Place of birth: Mizoram, India
- Height: 1.75 m (5 ft 9 in)
- Position: Striker

Team information
- Current team: Bengaluru United
- Number: 16

Senior career*
| Years | Team | Apps | (Gls) |
| ????–2018 | Chhinga Veng | | |
| 2018–2019 | Aizawl | 25 | (9) |
| 2019–2020 | Churchill Brothers | 13 | (5) |
| 2020–2022 | NorthEast United | 12 | (0) |
| 2022–2023 | Churchill Brothers | 13 | (2) |
| 2023–2024 | Chanmari | | |
| 2024– | Bengaluru United | 13 | (2) |
| 2024–25 | Chanmari | 13 | (3) |
- * Club domestic league appearances and goals

Lalkhawpuimawia (born 22 January 1992), commonly known by his nickname Mapuia, is an Indian professional footballer who plays as a forward.

== Career ==
Prior to 2017 Lalkhawpuimawia was playing football in the Mizoram semi-professional lower leagues with Chhinga Veng FC. He signed with Aizawl in January 2018.

On 23 February 2018 Lalkhawpuimawia scored his first professional goals, a brace in a 3–0 win over Indian Arrows.

=== NorthEast United ===
In 2020, Lalkhawpuimawia joined Indian Super League club NorthEast United on a two-year deal. Unfortunately he did not get debut for NorthEast United in 2020–21 Indian Super League season.

In 2021–22 Season he made his debut against Kerala Blasters FC on 25 November in a 0–0 draw.

== Career statistics ==
=== Club ===
As of 5 June 2023

| Club | Season | League | | | Cup | | Others | | AFC | | Total | |
| Club | Season | Division | Apps | Goals | Apps | Goals | Apps | Goals | Apps | Goals | Apps | Goals |
|---|---|---|---|---|---|---|---|---|---|---|---|---|
| Aizawl | 2017–18 | I-League | 8 | 3 | 2 (Note: Appearance(s) in Super Cup) | 0 | — | | 6 (Note: Appearance(s) in AFC Champions League) (Note: Appearance(s) in AFC Cup) | 0 | 16 | 3 |
| Aizawl | 2018–19 | I-League | 17 | 6 | 0 | 0 | — | | — | | 17 | 6 |
| Aizawl | Aizawl total | | 25 | 9 | 2 | 0 | 0 | 0 | 6 | 0 | 33 | 9 |
| Churchill Brothers | 2019–20 | I-League | 13 | 5 | 0 | 0 | — | | — | | 13 | 5 |
| NorthEast United | 2020–21 | Indian Super League | 0 | 0 | 0 | 0 | — | | — | | 0 | 0 |
| NorthEast United | 2021–22 | Indian Super League | 12 | 0 | 0 | 0 | — | | — | | 12 | 0 |
| NorthEast United | NorthEast total | | 12 | 0 | 0 | 0 | 0 | 0 | 0 | 0 | 12 | 0 |
| Churchill Brothers | 2022–23 | I-League | 13 | 2 | 0 | 0 | 2 (Note: Appearance(s) in Baji Rout Cup) | 1 | — | | 15 | 3 |
| Career total | | | 63 | 16 | 2 | 0 | 2 | 1 | 6 | 0 | 73 | 17 |
