= Nabin Rabha =

Indian footballer

Personal information
- Full name: Nabin Rabha
- Date of birth: 11 December 1996 (age 29)
- Place of birth: Boko, Assam, India
- Height: 1.70 m (5 ft 7 in)
- Position: Defender

Youth career
- SAI Guwahati Centre
- Kamrupa Football Coaching Centre

Senior career*
Years	Team	Apps	(Gls)
2017–2018	Fateh Hyderabad	10	(0)
2018–2020	Shillong Lajong	14	(0)
2020–2022	NorthEast United	0	(0)
- * Club domestic league appearances and goals as of 17:36, 28 February 2022 (UTC)

Nabin Rabha (born 11 December 1996) is an Indian professional footballer who lastly played as a defender for NorthEast United in the Indian Super League.

== Career ==
=== Early career ===
Born in Boko, Kamrup rural district, Rabha began his career with Kamrupa Football Coaching Centre at Boko. Later he joined SAI (Sports Authority of India), Guwahati Centre. He represented Meghalaya state team for the U-14 national (at Goa) and also selected for U-17 national team. He also played at Fateh Hyderabad AFC in the 2017–18 I-League 2nd Division.

=== Shillong Lajong F.C. ===
On 3 November 2018, Rabha rejoined Shillong Lajong F.C. from Fateh Hyderabad AFC for 2018–19 I-League season. He won the Meghalaya State League and the Shillong Premier League with Shillong Lajong FC in the 2019–20 season.

=== NorthEast United ===
On 10 June 2020, Nabin Rabha joined NorthEast United FC from Shillong Lajong.

== Career statistics ==
As of 28 February 2022

Club	Season	League			Cup		Continental		Total	
Club	Season	Division	Apps	Goals	Apps	Goals	Apps	Goals	Apps	Goals
Fateh Hyderabad	2017–18	I-League 2nd Division	10	0	0	0	0	0	10	0
Shillong Lajong	2018–19	I-League	14	0	0	0	0	0	14	0
Shillong Lajong	2019–20	I-League	0	0	0	0	0	0	0	0
Shillong Lajong	Total		14	0	0	0	0	0	14	0
NorthEast United	2020–21	Indian Super League	0	0	–		–		0	0
NorthEast United	2021–22	Indian Super League	0	0	–		–		0	0
Career total			24	0	0	0	0	0	24	0
