= Wilmar Jordán =

Colombian footballer (born 1990)

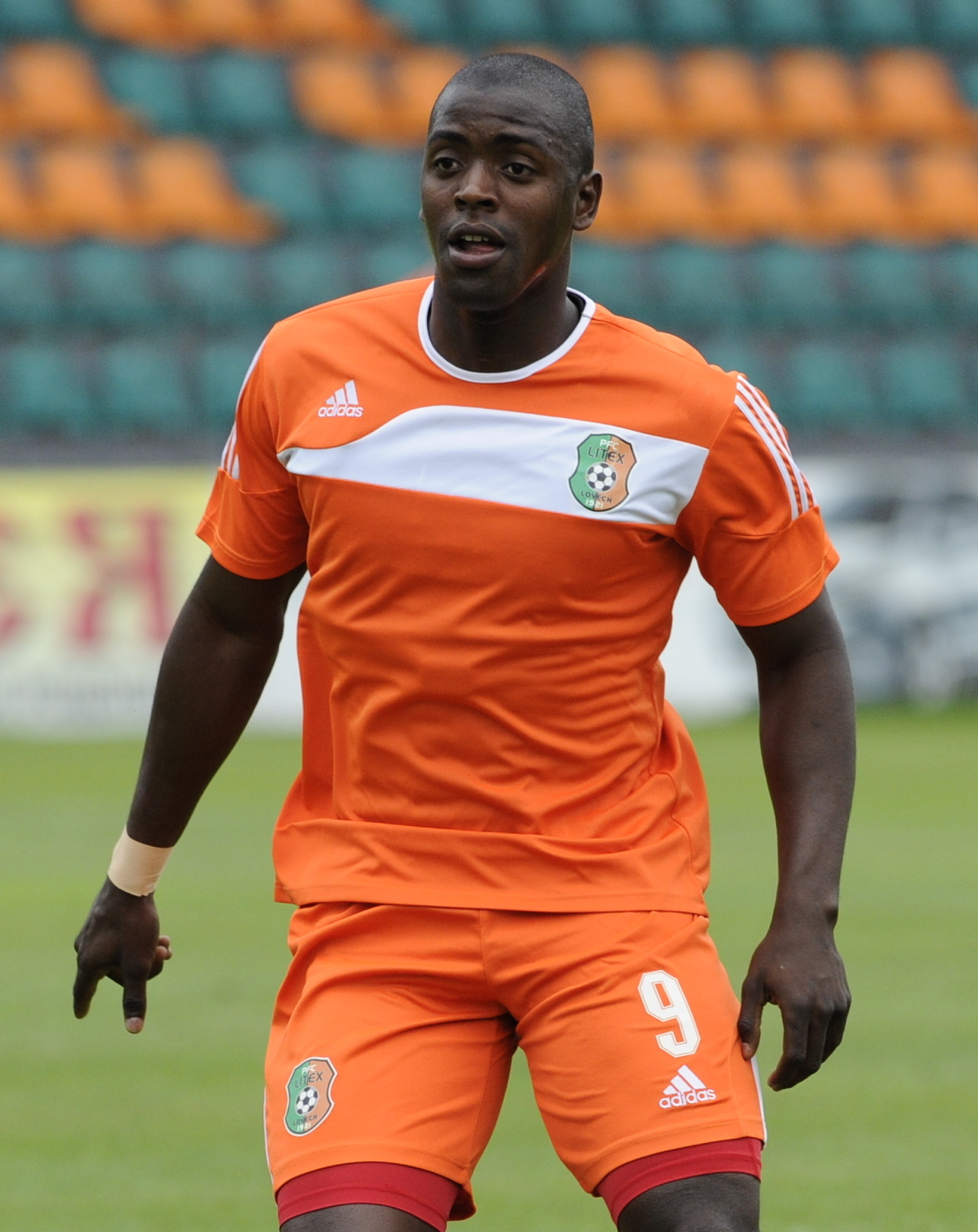
- Jordán with Litex Lovech in 2013

Personal information
- Full name: Wilmar Jordán Gil
- Date of birth: 17 October 1990 (age 36)
- Place of birth: Medellín, Colombia
- Height: 1.80 m (5 ft 11 in)
- Position: Striker

Team information
- Current team: Mumbai City
- Number: 9

Senior career*
Years	Team	Apps	(Gls)
2010–2011	Monagas	35	(19)
2011–2012	Gyeongnam	32	(5)
2013	Seongnam Ilhwa Chunma	2	(0)
2013–2015	Litex Lovech	54	(29)
2015–2016	Tianjin Teda	11	(1)
2015–2016	→ Emirates Club (loan)	13	(3)
2016	CSKA Sofia	3	(0)
2017–2018	Chaves	2	(0)
2018	→ Famalicão (loan)	3	(0)
2018	Leones	13	(3)
2019	Atlético Huila	11	(4)
2019–2020	Envigado	18	(3)
2021	Portuguesa	2	(0)
2022	Portuguesa	24	(5)
2022–2023	NorthEast United	11	(8)
2023–2024	Punjab	15	(8)
2024–2025	Chennaiyin	23	(10)
2025	Motagua	3	(0)
2025–2026	Immigration	21	(11)
2026–	Mumbai City	1	(0)
- * Club domestic league appearances and goals as of 13:23, 12 October 2026 (UTC)

Wilmar Jordán Gil (born 17 October 1990) is a Colombian professional footballer who plays as a striker for Indian Super League club Mumbai City.

== Career ==
Jordán started his senior career with Monagas in Venezuela. He made 35 appearances during the 2010–11 season in the Venezuelan Primera División finishing as the club's top scorer with 20 goals.

On 1 July 2011, Jordán joined Gyeongnam FC in South Korea. On 16 July, he marked his K League debut with a goal in a 7–1 victory over Daejeon Citizen. On 16 October, Jordán scored a brace as Gyeongnam beat Daegu 3–0.

In the summer of 2013 Jordán signed with Bulgarian side Litex Lovech. On 14 December 2013, he scored his first hat-trick for the team, in a 5–2 away league win over Lokomotiv Plovdiv. Jordán finished his first season in Bulgaria as leading A PFG goalscorer with 20 goals, together with Martin Kamburov.

On 27 February 2015, he joined Chinese Super League club Tianjin Teda.

On 18 August 2015, he joined U.A.E side Emirates Club on loan. Jordán scored a hat trick in a 4–3 win against Al Dhafra.

In May 2017, Jordán became part of the ranks of Portuguese club Chaves.

In early 2019, he signed a contract with Colombian side Atlético Huila.

In November 2022, Jordán signed for Indian Super League club NorthEast United.

On 31 August 2023, Jordán joined another ISL outfit, this time new promoted Punjab FC. He scored a brace on 12 February 2024, helped the team winning their first away win, defeating Kerala Blasters 3–1 in Kochi. On 10 April, he scored a brace for the club in their last league match against East Bengal in their biggest margin win (4–1).

In June 2024, Jordán signed a two-year deal with ISL club Chennaiyin FC. Wilmar debuted for the club as substitute on 14 September against Odisha FC.

On 12 June 2025, Liga Hondubet club Motagua announced Jordán had signed for the club.

Following a stint at Immigration F.C. of the Malaysian Super League, Jordán returned to the ISL to sign for Mumbai City on a one-year deal, valid until the end of the 2026-27 season.

== Career statistics ==
=== Club ===
As of match played 23 April 2025

Appearances and goals by club, season and competition
Club	Season	League			Cup (Note: Includes Bulgarian Cup, UAE League Cup, Taça da Liga, Copa Colombia, Super Cup)		Continental		Total	
Club	Season	Division	Apps	Goals	Apps	Goals	Apps	Goals	Apps	Goals
Monagas	2010–11	Primera División	35	19	0	0	—		35	19
Gyeongnam	2011	K League	10	3	0	0	—		10	3
Gyeongnam	2012	K League	22	2	0	0	—		22	2
Gyeongnam	Total		32	5	0	0	—		32	5
Seongnam Ilhwa Chunma	2013	K League	2	0	0	0	0	0	2	0
Litex Lovech	2013–14	A Group	35	20	3	1	—		38	21
Litex Lovech	2014–15	A Group	19	9	3	2	4 (Note: Appearances in UEFA Europa League)	3	26	14
Litex Lovech	Total		54	29	6	3	4	3	64	35
Tianjin Teda	2015	Chinese Super League	11	1	0	0	—		11	1
Emirates Club (loan)	2015–16	UAE Pro-League	13	3	4	3	—		17	6
CSKA Sofia	2016–17	First League	3	0	1	0	—		4	0
Chaves	2017–18	Primeira Liga	2	0	1	0	—		3	0
Famalicão (loan)	2017–18	LigaPro	3	0	0	0	—		3	0
Leones	2018	Categoría Primera A	13	3	2	0	—		15	3
Atlético Huila	2019	Categoría Primera A	11	4	2	1	—		13	5
Envigado	2019	Categoría Primera A	15	3	0	0	—		15	3
Envigado	2020	Categoría Primera A	3	0	0	0	—		3	0
Envigado	Total		18	3	0	0	—		18	3
Portuguesa	2022	Série D	2	0	0	0	—		2	0
Portuguesa	2022	Primera División	24	5	0	0	—		24	5
NorthEast United	2022–23	Indian Super League	11	8	4	7	—		15	15
Punjab	2023–24	Indian Super League	15	8	3	1	—		18	9
Chennaiyin	2024–25	Indian Super League	23	10	1	0	—		24	10
Immigration	2025–26	Malaysia Super League	21	11	5	1	—		26	12
Career Total			292	108	29	16	4	3	325	127

== Honours ==
Individual

- Bulgarian A Football Group – top scorer: 2013–14 (20 goals)
- Indian Super Cup top scorer: 2023
