= Pragyan Gogoi =

Indian footballer

Personal information
- Full name: Pragyan Sundar Gogoi
- Date of birth: 25 January 1999 (age 27)
- Place of birth: Simaluguri, Assam, India
- Position: Midfielder

Team information
- Current team: Kannur Warriors FC
- Number: 43

Youth career
- 2017: Shillong Lajong U18
- 2017–18: Kerala Blasters U18

Senior career*
Years	Team	Apps	(Gls)
2018–2020	Kerala Blasters B	13	(3)
2020–2024	NorthEast United	37	(0)
2024–2025	Kannur Warriors	10	(1)
2025	Namdhari	8	(0)
2025	United Kolkata		
2025–2026	Rajasthan United	2	(0)
- * Club domestic league appearances and goals as of September 2026

Pragyan Sundar Gogoi (born 25 January 1999) is an Indian professional footballer who plays as a midfielder.

== Career ==
Born in Sivasagar, Assam, Pragyan Gogoi started his football career with Shillong Lajong U18 and then moved to Kerala Blasters U-18. He also captained Kerala Blasters U-18 to the final of 2017–18 Youth League U18. He was then promoted to the Kerala Blasters Reserves to play in I-League 2nd Division. During 2019–20 Kerala Premier League season, He captained Kerala Blasters Reserves to their first ever Kerala Premier League title.

=== NorthEast United ===
On 15 October 2020, Pragyan Gogoi joined NorthEast United on a three-year deal. He made his debut for the club on 30 January 2021 against Mumbai City FC. He came on as a 92nd-minute substitute for Federico Gallego as NorthEast United won game for 2–1.

== Personal life ==
Gogoi hails from Assam's Nazira, a town situated in the district of Sivasagar. His younger brother Parthib Gogoi is also a professional footballer.

== Career statistics ==
=== Club ===
As of 4 December 2023

Club	Season	League			Cup		AFC		Total	
Club	Season	Division	Apps	Goals	Apps	Goals	Apps	Goals	Apps	Goals
Kerala Blasters B	2017–18	I-League 2nd Division	3	0	0	0	—		3	0
Kerala Blasters B	2018–19	I-League 2nd Division	7	3	0	0	—		7	3
Kerala Blasters B	2019–20	I-League 2nd Division	3	0	0	0	—		3	0
Kerala Blasters B	Total		13	3	0	0	0	0	13	3
NorthEast United	2020–21	Indian Super League	2	0	0	0	—		2	0
NorthEast United	2021–22	Indian Super League	13	0	0	0	—		13	0
NorthEast United	2022–23	Indian Super League	16	0	3 (Note: Appearance(s) in Super Cup)	0	—		19	0
NorthEast United	2023–24	Indian Super League	6	0	4 (Note: Appearance(s) in Durand Cup)	0	—		10	0
NorthEast United	Total		37	0	7	0	0	0	44	0
Career total			50	3	7	0	0	0	57	3
