= Alex Saji =

Indian footballer

Personal information
- Date of birth: 9 May 2000 (age 26)
- Place of birth: Wayanad, Kerala, India
- Height: 1.87 m (6 ft 2 in)
- Position: Centre-back

Team information
- Current team: Mohun Bagan

Youth career
- 2008–2015: Redstar Football Academy
- 2015–2017: Kerala Blasters B

Senior career*
Years	Team	Apps	(Gls)
2017–2019	Kerala Blasters	1	(0)
2019–2022	Gokulam Kerala	16	(0)
2022–2025	Hyderabad	31	(0)
2022–2023	→ NorthEast United (loan)	7	(0)
2025–2026	SC Delhi	7	(0)
2026–	Mohun Bagan	0	(0)

International career
2021–2023	India U23	0	(0)
- * Club domestic league appearances and goals as of 20:21, 26 April 2026 (UTC)

Alex Saji (born 9 May 2000) is an Indian professional footballer who plays as a defender for Indian Super League club Mohun Bagan.

== Club career ==
=== Gokulam Kerala ===
In July 2019 Saji joined I-League club Gokulam Kerala FC on a season-long contract.

He then promoted to the main team which goes to kolkata for 2020–21 I-League season.

=== Hyderabad ===
On 15 July 2022, Hyderabad completed the signing of Saji on a three-year deal.

== International career ==
On 2 October 2021, Saji was selected for 2022 AFC U-23 Asian Cup Qualification matches which were scheduled to be played between 23 and 31 October 2021.

== Career statistics ==
=== Club ===
As of 26 October 2024

Club	Season	League			Cup		AFC		Total	
Club	Season	Division	Apps	Goals	Apps	Goals	Apps	Goals	Apps	Goals
Kerala Blasters B	2017–18	I-League 2nd Division	1	0	0	0	—		1	0
Gokulam Kerala	2020–21	I-League	5	0	0	0	—		5	0
Gokulam Kerala	2021–22	I-League	11	0	8 (Note: Appearance(s) in Durand Cup) (Note: Appearance(s) in IFA Shield)	0	3 (Note: Appearance(s) in AFC Cup)	0	22	0
Gokulam Kerala	Total		16	0	8	0	3	0	27	0
Hyderabad	2022–23	Indian Super League	0	0	2	0	—		2	0
Hyderabad	2023–24	Indian Super League	10	0	6 (Note: Appearance(s) in Super Cup)	0	—		16	0
Hyderabad	2024–25	Indian Super League	5	0	0	0	—		5	0
Hyderabad	Total		15	0	8	0	0	0	23	0
NorthEast United (loan)	2022–23	Indian Super League	7	0	4	0	—		11	0
Career total			39	0	20	0	3	0	62	0

== Honours ==
Gokulam Kerala

- I-League: 2020–21, 2021–22

Mohun Bagan

- Calcutta Football League: 2026
- IFA Shield: 2026
