= Rochharzela =

Indian association footballer (born 1998)

Personal information
- Full name: Rochharzela
- Date of birth: 15 April 1998 (age 28)
- Place of birth: Mizoram, India
- Height: 1.72 m (5 ft 7 1/2 in)
- Position: Winger

Team information
- Current team: Sreenidi Decan

Youth career
- –2017: Aizawl U18

Senior career*
Years	Team	Apps	(Gls)
2017–2020	Aizawl	28	(7)
2020–2024	NorthEast United	38	(5)
2024–2026	Mohammedan	9	(0)
2026–	Sreenidi Decan	0	(0)
- * Club domestic league appearances and goals as of 15:33, 21 October 2023 (UTC)

Rochharzela (born April 15, 1998), popularly known as Chhara, is an Indian professional footballer who plays as a winger for Indian Football League club Sreenidi Decan.

== Club career ==
=== Aizawl FC ===
Born in India, Rochharzela made his senior debut with I-League club Aizawl F.C., during the 2017–18 season.

In the 2019–20 season, Rochharzela was the top Aizawl Football Club goal scorer, scoring the greatest goal tally by an Indian during the season. He helped Aizawl come back to tie a game against Real Kashmir,⁣ who took a lead of 2–0 after Mason Robertson and Kallum Higginbotham scored. Rochharzela's goal helped the team finish the game with a final score of 2–2.

Rochharzela also plays for the club in the Mizoram Premier League and won Skynet Young Player Of The Year in Mizoram in the 2017–18 season.

=== NorthEast United ===
In 2020, Rochharzela joined Indian Super League club NorthEast United on a three-year deal. Rochharzela scored 1 goal in 12 appearances in the 2020–21 Indian Super League.

He played his first match of the 2021–22 Indian Super League on 20 November 2021, as a substitute for V.P. Suhair in the 66th minute of the game which ended in a 2–4 loss. He scored a goal for NorthEast United on 4 December against FC Goa in their 2–1 win.

== Career statistics ==
=== Club ===
As of 15 January 2023

Club	Season	League			Cup		AFC		Total	
Club	Season	Division	Apps	Goals	Apps	Goals	Apps	Goals	Apps	Goals
Aizawl	2017–18	I-League	7	0	0	0	1 (Note: Appearances in the AFC Champions League)	0	8	0
Aizawl	2018–19	I-League	6	1	0	0	–		7	1
Aizawl	2019–20	I-League	15	6	0	0	–		15	6
NorthEast United	2020–21	Indian Super League	12	1	—		—		12	1
NorthEast United	2021–22	Indian Super League	11	1	0	0	—		11	1
NorthEast United	2022–23	Indian Super League	12	2	1	1	—		13	3
Career total			63	11	0	0	1	0	65	12
