= Gani Nigam =

Indian footballer

Personal information
- Full name: Gani Ahmed Nigam
- Date of birth: 1 May 1998 (age 28)
- Place of birth: Nadapuram, Kozhikode, Kerala, India
- Height: 1.75 m (5 ft 9 in)
- Position: Winger

Team information
- Current team: Calicut
- Number: 11

Senior career*
Years	Team	Apps	(Gls)
2017−2018	Pune City (R)	2	(1)
2018	Pune City	0	(0)
2018−2019	Gokulam Kerala	5	(1)
2019−2020	Hyderabad FC	5	(0)
2019–2020	Hyderabad FC (R)	5	(2)
2020–2021	Mohammedan	7	(1)
2021–2024	NorthEast United	19	(0)
2024–2025	Calicut	11	(4)
2025	Diamond Harbour	3	(0)
2025–2026	Malappuram	5	(0)
2026–	Calicut	1	(0)
- * Club domestic league appearances and goals as of 8 March 2026

Gani Ahmmed Nigam (born 1 May 1998) is an Indian professional footballer who plays as a winger for the Super League Kerala club Calicut.

== Club career ==
=== Gokulam Kerala ===
He was signed by his hometown club Gokulam Kerala FC and got some game time at the top division league, playing in 5 I-League matches and notching up one goal against Shillong Lajong.

=== Hyderabad FC ===
In 2019 he was picked up by Hyderabad FC, and over the course of the season he got only one start in ISL 2019-20 and 4 appearances as a substitute.

=== Mohammedans SC ===
Gani Ahmed Nigam has joined Mohammedan Sporting as the 129 year old club aims for a resurgence in the national stage.

=== NorthEast United ===
On 29 October 2021, Gani joined Indian Super League club NorthEast United. He made his debut for the club on 10 December, in their 1–0 defeat to Odisha. By the end of the season he made six appearances for the NorthEast United.

Gani extends his contract with NorthEast United for the 2022–23 season. He scored his first goal for Highlanders against Sudeva Delhi in 2022 Durand Cup.

=== Malappuram FC ===
2025: In mid-August, Gani Nigam joined Malappuram FC, ahead of the new Super League Kerala season.

== Career statistics ==
As of 24 December 2022

Club	Season	League			League Cup		Domestic Cup		Continental		Total	
Club	Season	Division	Apps	Goals	Apps	Goals	Apps	Goals	Apps	Goal	Apps	Goal
Pune City (R)	2017–18	I-League 2nd Division	2	1	0	0	0	0	0	0	2	1
Pune City	2017–18	Indian Super League	0	0	0	0	0	0	0	0	0	0
Gokulam Kerala	2018–19	I-League	5	1	0	0	0	0	0	0	5	1
Hyderabad	2019–20	Indian Super League	5	0	0	0	0	0	0	0	5	0
Hyderabad (R)	2019–20	I-League 2nd	5	2	0	0	0	0	0	0	5	2
Mohammedan	2019–20	I-League 2nd	5	1	0	0	0	0	0	0	5	1
Mohammedan	2020–21	I-League	2	0	0	0	4 (Note: Appearances in IFA Shield)	2	0	0	6	2
Mohammedan	Total		7	1	0	0	4	2	0	0	11	3
NorthEast United	2021–22	Indian Super League	6	0	0	0	—		—		6	0
NorthEast United	2022–23	Indian Super League	4	0	0	0	1 (Note: Appearance(s) in Durand Cup)	1	—		5	1
NorthEast United	2023–24	Indian Super League	9	0	3 (Note: Appearance(s) in Super Cup)	0	4	0	–		16	0
Career total			43	5	3	0	9	3	0	0	55	8

== Honours ==
Mohammedan Sporting

- I-League 2nd Division: 2019–20

Calicut FC

- Super League Kerala: 2024

== Personal ==
On 21 September 2026 suffered serioues injuries during a motorcycle crash on Gandhi Road, near Malabar Christian College in Kozhikode in which his teammate Rijohn Jose died.
