= 2019–20 NorthEast United FC season =

2019–20 season of NorthEast United FC

NorthEast United
2019–20 season
- Owner: John Abraham
- Head Coach: Robert Jarni (until 10 February 2020); Khalid Jamil (interim)
- Stadium: Indira Gandhi Athletic Stadium, Guwahati
- ISL: 9th
- Super Cup: Tournament Suspended
- Top goalscorer: League: Asamoah Gyan (4); All: Asamoah Gyan (4)
- Highest home attendance: 17,942
- Lowest home attendance: 1,000
- Average home league attendance: 8,253
Home colours	Away colours	Third colours

The 2019–20 NorthEast United FC season was the club's sixth season since its establishment in 2014 and their sixth season in the Indian Super League.

== Players ==
=== Current squad ===
Squad No.	Name	Nationality	Position(s)	Date of Birth (Age)
Goalkeepers
1	Pawan Kumar	(India)	GK	1 July 1990 (age 35)
16	Soram Anganba	(India)	GK	24 December 1992 (age 32)
24	Subhasish Roy Chowdhury	(India)	GK	27 September 1986 (age 38)
Defenders
5	Provat Lakra	(India)	LB / RB	12 August 1997 (age 27)
15	Mislav Komorski	(Croatia)	CB	17 April 1992 (age 33)
14	Kai Heerings	(Netherlands)	CB	12 January 1990 (age 35)
26	Shouvik Ghosh	(India)	LB	5 November 1992 (age 32)
2	Wayne Vaz	(India)	CB / RB / DM	28 July 1994 (age 31)
29	Nim Dorjee Tamang	(India)	CB / RB	28 October 1995 (age 29)
33	Rakesh Pradhan	(India)	RB / LB	2 August 1997 (age 28)
12	Reagan Singh	(India)	LB	1 April 1991 (age 34)
34	Pawan Kumar	(India)	LB	12 May 1995 (age 30)
Midfielders
32	Lalthathanga Khawlhring	(India)	CM / DM	30 March 1998 (age 27)
8	Milan Singh	(India)	CM / DM / AM	15 May 1992 (age 33)
22	Redeem Tlang	(India)	RM / RW / AM	22 February 1995 (age 30)
10	Federico Gallego	(Uruguay)	AM / RM / LM	13 June 1990 (age 35)
23	Nikhil Kadam	(India)	RW / LW	23 June 1993 (age 32)
6	José David Leudo	(Colombia)	CM	9 November 1993 (age 31)
13	Fanai Lalrempuia	(India)	CM	11 May 1996 (age 29)
21	Rupert Nongrum	(India)	RM / RB / CM	21 August 1996 (age 28)
7	Ninthoinganba Meetei	(India)	RW / LW	13 July 2001 (age 24)
30	Lalengmawia	(India)	CM / AM / LW	17 October 2000 (age 24)
Strikers
11	Martín Cháves	(Uruguay)	CF / LW / RW	12 May 1998 (age 27)
9	Andrew Keogh	(Republic of Ireland)	CF	16 May 1986 (age 39)
–	Simon Lundevall	(Sweden)	LW / RW	23 September 1988 (age 36)

== Transfers ==
=== Loan return and Retained players ===
Date	Pos.	Name	From	Type	Ref.
24 May 2019	MF	(India) Redeem Tlang	-	Retained	
30 May 2019	MF	(India) Lalthathanga Khawlhring	-	Retained	
31 May 2019	FW	(India) Kivi Zhimomi	TRAU	Loan return	
5 June 2019	MF	(India) Nikhil Kadam	-	Retained	
6 June 2019	MF	(India) Fanai Lalrempuia	-	Retained	
7 June 2019	GK	(India) Pawan Kumar	-	Retained	
10 June 2019	DF	(India) Provat Lakra	-	Retained	
11 June 2019	GK	(India) Gurmeet Singh	-	Retained	
13 June 2019	MF	(India) Rupert Nongrum	-	Retained	
18 June 2019	DF	(India) Shouvik Ghosh	-	Retained	

=== In ===
-- If anyone knows the transfer fee update it here -->
No.	Pos.	Name	From	Date	Type	Ref.
TBD	MF	(India) Lalengmawia	Indian Arrows	23 May 2019	Free	
TBD	MF	(India) Ninthoinganba Meetei	Indian Arrows	31 May 2019	Free	
TBD	DF	(India) Wayne Vaz	FC Pune City	3 June 2019	Free	

== Management ==
As of 24 July 2019.

Position	Name
Head Coach	(India) Khalid Jamil (interim)
Assistant Coach	(Croatia) Sasa Glavas
Assistant Coach and Head of Academy	(India) Khalid Jamil
Goalkeeping Coach	(India) Sandip Nandy
Technical Advisor	(Israel) Avram Grant
Strength and conditioning coach	(Spain) Jose Carlos Barosso
Strength and conditioning coach	(Croatia) Ivica Vrgoc
Physiotherapist	(India) Arvind Yadav

== Competitions ==
=== Indian Super League ===
==== League table ====
Pos	Team	Pld	W	D	L	GF	GA	GD	Pts
6	Odisha	18	7	4	7	28	31	−3	25
7	Kerala Blasters	18	4	7	7	29	32	−3	19
8	Jamshedpur	18	4	6	8	22	35	−13	18
9	NorthEast United	18	2	8	8	16	30	−14	14
10	Hyderabad	18	2	4	12	21	39	−18	10

Source: Indian Super League
Rules for classification: 1) points; 2) head-to-head points; 3) head-to-head goal difference; 4) head-to-head goals scored; 5) goal difference; 5) number of goals scored; 6) fair play ranking; 6) drawing of lots

==== Results summary ====
Overall								Home						Away					
Pld	W	D	L	GF	GA	GD	Pts	W	D	L	GF	GA	GD	W	D	L	GF	GA	GD
18	2	8	8	16	30	−14	14	1	5	3	12	20	−8	1	3	5	4	10	−6

Last updated: 20 February 2020.
Source: Matches

==== Results by matchday ====
Matchday	1	2	3	4	5	6	7	8	9	10	11	12	13	14	15	16	17	18
Ground	A	H	H	A	H	A	H	H	A	A	A	A	A	H	H	A	H	H
Result	D	W	D	W	D	D	L	L	D	L	L	L	L	D	D	L	L	D
Position	3	3	4	3	4	4	5	6	8	9	9	9	9	9	9	9	9	9

Updated to match(es) played on 25 February 2020. Source: soccerway
A = Away; H = Home; W = Win; D = Draw; L = Loss

==== Fixtures ====
League stage

21 October 2019 1	Bengaluru	0–0	NorthEast United	Bengaluru
19:30 IST (UTC+05:30)		Report	Chowdhury (yellow card) 66'	Stadium: Sree Kanteerava Stadium; Attendance: 15,971; Referee: Venkatesh; Man of the Match: Augusto (Kerala)

26 October 2019 2	NorthEast United	2–1	Odisha	Guwahati
19:30 IST (UTC+05:30)	Tlang 2' (yellow card) 89'; Triadis (yellow card) 38'; Chowdhury (yellow card) 45+1'; Gyan (yellow card) 45+2' (goal) 84'; Vaz (yellow card) 71'	Report	Sarangi (yellow card) 21'; Hernández 71'; Delgado (red card) 73'; Kumar (yellow card) 90'	Stadium: Indira Gandhi Athletic Stadium; Attendance: 14,672; Referee: Baksi; Man of the Match: Gyan (NorthEast)

1 November 2019 3	NorthEast United	2–2	Goa	Guwahati
19:30 IST (UTC+05:30)	Pradhan (yellow card) 33'; Leudo (yellow card) 37'; Gyan 54'; Tlang (yellow card) 58' (goal) 74'; Heerings (yellow card) 90+5'	Report	Boumous 31'; Doungel (red card) 90+3'; Singh 90+6'	Stadium: Indira Gandhi Athletic Stadium; Attendance: 17,273; Referee: Srikrishna; Man of the Match: Tlang (NorthEast)

6 November 2019 4	Hyderabad	0–1	NorthEast United	Hyderabad
19:30 IST (UTC+05:30)	Singh (yellow card) 13'; Halder (yellow card) 76'; Sampingiraj (yellow card) 85'; Kilgallon (yellow card) 89'; Singh (yellow card) 90+5'	Report	Vaz (yellow card) 85'; Barreiro 86' (pen.); Singh (yellow card) 90+2'; Chowdhury (yellow card) 90+4'	Stadium: G. M. C. Balayogi Athletic Stadium; Attendance: 8,190; Referee: Thakur; Man of the Match: Barreiro (NorthEast)

27 November 2019 5	NorthEast United	2–2	Mumbai City	Guwahati
19:30 IST (UTC+05:30)	Triadis 9'; Gyan 42'	Report	Chermiti 23', 32' (yellow card) 50'; Sougou (yellow card) 50'; Bose (yellow card) 80'	Stadium: Indira Gandhi Athletic Stadium; Attendance: 17,942; Referee: Thakur; Man of the Match: Gyan (NorthEast)

2 December 2019 6	Jamshedpur	1–1	NorthEast United	Jamshedpur
19:30 IST (UTC+05:30)	Castel 28'; Gurung (yellow card) 87'	Report	Cháves (yellow card) 22'; Triadis 90' (yellow card) 90+1'	Stadium: JRD Tata Sports Complex; Attendance: 20,633; Referee: Nathan; Man of the Match: Choudhary (Jamshedpur)

7 December 2019 7	NorthEast United	0–3	ATK	Guwahati
19:30 IST (UTC+05:30)	Triadis (yellow card) 48'; Leudo (yellow card) 70'; Khawlhring (yellow card) 83'	Report	Williams 11'; Krishna 35', 90+4'; Das (yellow card) 71'; Singh (yellow card) 76'; Bhattacharya (yellow card) 86'	Stadium: Indira Gandhi Athletic Stadium; Attendance: 13,393; Referee: Alkhudhayr; Man of the Match: Williams (ATK)

18 December 2019 8	NorthEast United	0–2	Bengaluru	Guwahati
18:00 IST (UTC+05:30)	Tlang (yellow card) 41'	Report	Paartalu (yellow card) 42'; Chhetri 68' (pen.); Serrán 81'	Stadium: Indira Gandhi Athletic Stadium; Referee: Bora; Man of the Match: Juanan (Bengaluru)

28 December 2019 9	Kerala Blasters	1-1	NorthEast United	Kochi
19:30 IST (UTC+05:30)	Singh (yellow card) 37'; Ogbeche 43' (pen.); Jessel (yellow card) 52'	Report	Chowdhury (yellow card) 42'; Gyan 50' (pen.) (yellow card) 53'; Lalengmawia (yellow card) 62'	Stadium: Jawaharlal Nehru Stadium; Attendance: 12,168; Referee: Rahul Kumar Gupta; Man of the Match: Mario Arques (Kerala)

8 January 2020 10	Goa	2-0	NorthEast United	Goa
19:30 IST (UTC+05:30)	Brandon Fernandes (yellow card) 38'; Mislav Komorski 69' (og.); Mandar (yellow card) 77'; Coro 82' (pen.)	Report	Reagan Singh (yellow card) 31'; Leudo (red card) 80'; Gallego (yellow card) 81'	Stadium: Jawaharlal Nehru Stadium; Attendance: 12,744; Referee: Crystal John; Man of the Match: Lenny Rodrigues (FC Goa)

16 January 2020 11	Chenniyin	2-0	NorthEast United	Chennai
19:30 IST (UTC+05:30)	Rafael Crivellaro 57'; Nerijus Valskis 60'	Report		Stadium: Jawaharlal Nehru Stadium; Attendance: 8,250; Referee: Kasimov Sherzod; Man of the Match: Rafael Crivellaro (Chennaiyin)

27 January 2020 12	ATK	1-0	NorthEast United	Kolkata
19:30 IST (UTC+05:30)	Victor Mongil (yellow card) 53'; Roy (yellow card) 66'; Balwant Singh 90'	Report	Chowdhury (yellow card) 75'; Reagan Singh (yellow card) 87'	Stadium: Vivekananda Yuba Bharati Krirangan; Attendance: 15,101; Referee: Crystal John; Man of the Match: Balwant Singh (ATK)

31 January 2020 13	Mumbai City FC	1-0	NorthEast United	Mumbai
19:30 IST (UTC+05:30)	Diego Carlos (yellow card) 7'; Mohammed Rafique (yellow card) 19'; Diego Carlos 44'; Modou Sougou (yellow card) 79'	Report	Reagan Singh (yellow card) 87+90' (red card) 90'; Nikhil Kadam (yellow card) 90'	Stadium: Mumbai Football Arena; Attendance: 4,563; Referee: R Venkatesh; Man of the Match: Diego Carlos (Mumbai)

7 February 2020 14	NorthEast United	0-0	Kerala Blasters	Guwahati
19:30 IST (UTC+05:30)	Milan Singh (yellow card) 12'; Rakesh Pradhan (yellow card) 21'; Wayne Vaz (yellow card) 44'; Gallego (yellow card) 81'	Report	Ogbeche (yellow card) 35'; Moustapha Gning (yellow card) 90'	Stadium: Indira Gandhi Athletic Stadium; Referee: Ranjit Baksi; Man of the Match: Lalengmawia (NorthEast United)

10 February 2020 15	NorthEast United	3-3	Jamshedpur	Guwahati
19:30 IST (UTC+05:30)	Gallego 5' (yellow card) 90'; Heerings (yellow card) 55'; Tlang 77'; Lalengmawia (yellow card) 87'; Leudo 88' (yellow card) 90'; Chaves (yellow card) 90'	Report	Grande 45'; Choudhary (yellow card) 67+87' (red card) 87'; Acosta (yellow card) 76' (goal) 82'; Memo 85'; Mandi (yellow card) 90'	Stadium: Indira Gandhi Athletic Stadium; Referee: Dingert Christian; Man of the Match: Leudo (NorthEast United)

14 February 2020 16	Odisha	2-1	NorthEast United	Bhubaneswar
19:30 IST (UTC+05:30)	Sarangi (yellow card) 29'; Vinit Rai (yellow card) 31'; Manuel Onwu 46' (yellow card) 84'; Martín Pérez Guedes 72' (yellow card) 90'	Report	Redeem Tlang (yellow card) 19'; Cháves 24'; Leudo (yellow card) 35'; Rakesh Pradhan (yellow card) 37'; Wayne Vaz (yellow card) 84'	Stadium: Kalinga Stadium; Attendance: 6,456; Referee: Muhammad Taqi Aljaafari Bin Jahari; Man of the Match: Xisco Hernández (Odisha FC)

20 February 2020 17	NorthEast United	1-5	Hyderabad	Guwahati
19:30 IST (UTC+05:30)	Keogh 34'; Gallego (yellow card) 57'; Chaves (yellow card) 78'	Report	Colaco 12' 41'; Marcelinho 13' 87'; Panwar (yellow card) 45'; Yasir 55'	Stadium: Indira Gandhi Athletic Stadium; Man of the Match: Colaco (Hyderabad FC)

25 February 2020 18	NorthEast United	2-2	Chennaiyin	Guwahati
19:30 IST (UTC+05:30)	Chaves 43' (pen.) 71'	Report	Saighani 17'; German (yellow card) 32'; Singh (red card); Chhangte 90+2'	Stadium: Indira Gandhi Athletic Stadium; Man of the Match: Chaves (NorthEast United)

== Squad statistics ==
=== Goalscorers ===
Rank	No.	Pos.	Player	League	Super Cup	Total
1	3	FW	(Ghana) Asamoah Gyan	4	0	4
2	22	FW	(India) Redeem Tlang	3	0	3
2	11	FW	(Uruguay) Martin Chaves	3	0	3
4	21	FW	(Greece) Panagiotis Triadis	2	0	2
5	9	FW	(Republic of Ireland) Andrew Keogh	1	0	1
5	20	FW	(Argentina) Maximiliano Barreiro	1	0	1
5	10	MF	(Uruguay) Federico Gallego	1	0	1
5	6	MF	(Colombia) José David Leudo	1	0	1
Totals				16	0	16
