= 2018–19 NorthEast United FC season =

2018–19 season of NorthEast United FC

NorthEast United
2018–19 season
- Owner: John Abraham
- Head Coach: Eelco Schattorie
- Stadium: Indira Gandhi Athletic Stadium, Guwahati
- ISL: 4th (semi-finalists)
- Super Cup: Quarter-finals
- Top goalscorer: League: Bartholomew Ogbeche (12); All: Bartholomew Ogbeche (12)
- Highest home attendance: 22,567
- Lowest home attendance: 9,134
- Average home league attendance: 17,656
Home colours	Away colours	Third colours

The 2018–19 NorthEast United FC season was the club's fifth season since its establishment in 2014 and their fifth season in the Indian Super League.

== Players ==
=== Current squad ===
Squad no.	Name	Nationality	Position(s)	Date of birth (age)
Goalkeepers
13	Rehenesh TP	(India)	GK	13 February 1993 (age 33)
1	Pawan Kumar	(India)	GK	1 July 1990 (age 36)
31	Gurmeet Singh	(India)	GK	3 December 1999 (age 26)
Defenders
2	Janeiler Rivas	(Colombia)	CB	18 May 1988 (age 38)
12	Reagan Singh	(India)	RB / CB	1 April 1991 (age 35)
19	Robert Lalthlamuana	(India)	LB / RB / LM	4 September 1988 (age 38)
5	Provat Lakra	(India)	LB / RB	12 August 1997 (age 29)
4	Pawan Kumar	(India)	CB / RB	12 May 1995 (age 31)
16	Gurwinder Singh	(India)	CB / DM	16 April 1986 (age 40)
20	Keegan Pereira	(India)	LB	7 November 1987 (age 39)
3	Mislav Komorski	(Croatia)	CB / LB / DM	17 April 1992 (age 34)
18	Mato Grgić	(Croatia)	CB	27 September 1987 (age 39)
TBD	Shouvik Ghosh	(India)	LB	5 November 1992 (age 34)
Midfielders
7	Fanai Lalrempuia	(India)	CM	11 May 1996 (age 30)
9	Federico Gallego	(Uruguay)	AM / RW / LW	13 June 1990 (age 36)
6	José David Leudo	(Colombia)	CM	9 November 1993 (age 33)
21	Rupert Nongrum	(India)	RM / RB / CM	21 August 1996 (age 30)
11	Simranjit Singh	(India)	RM / CM / RB / CB / DM	25 January 1992 (age 34)
32	Lalthathanga Khawlhring	(India)	CM / DM	30 March 1998 (age 28)
22	Redeem Tlang	(India)	RM / RW / AM	22 February 1995 (age 31)
14	Rowllin Borges	(India)	DM	5 June 1992 (age 34)
TBD	Seityasen Singh	(India)	RM / LM	12 March 1992 (age 34)
27	Panagiotis Triadis	(Greece)	LW / SS / RW	9 September 1992 (age 34)
23	Nikhil Kadam	(India)	RW / LW	23 June 1993 (age 33)
Strikers
15	Kivi Zhimomi	(India)	CF / SS	3 May 1996 (age 30)
8	Girik Khosla	(India)	CF / LW / RW	4 January 1995 (age 31)
24	Juan Cruz Mascia	(Uruguay)	CF	3 January 1994 (age 32)
10	Bartholomew Ogbeche (C)	(Nigeria)	CF / LW / RW	1 October 1984 (age 42)

== Transfers ==
=== Loan return and Retained players ===
Date	Pos.	Name	From	Type	Ref.
28 July 2018	MF	(India) Lalthathanga Khawlhring	Aizawl F.C.	Loan return	
21 July 2018	MF	(India) Rowllin Borges	–	Retained	
21 July 2018	MF	(India) Rehenesh TP	–	Retained	
21 July 2018	MF	(India) Fanai Lalrempuia	–	Retained	
21 July 2018	MF	(India) Reagan Singh	–	Retained	
9 August 2018	MF	(India) Robert Lalthlamuana	–	Retained	

=== In ===
No.	Pos.	Name	From	Date	Type	Ref.
TBD	MF	(India) Seityasen Singh	Delhi Dynamos	1 August 2018	Free	
22	MF	(India) Redeem Tlang	Shillong Lajong	31 July 2018	Free	
23	MF	(India) Nikhil Kadam	Mohun Bagan	24 July 2018	Free	
1	GK	(India) Pawan Kumar	Chennaiyin	25 July 2018	Free	
5	DF	(India) Provat Lakra	Pathachakra	6 August 2018	Free	
16	DF	(India) Gurwinder Singh	East Bengal	25 July 2018	Free	
4	DF	(India) Pawan Kumar	FC Pune City	25 July 2018	Free	
15	FW	(India) Kivi Zhimomi	Gokulam	24 July 2018	Free	
8	FW	(India) Girik Khosla	Minerva Punjab	3 August 2018	Free	
11	MF	(India) Simranjit Singh	Delhi Dynamos	16 August 2018	Free	
21	MF	(India) Rupert Nongrum	ATK	16 August 2018	Free	
10	FW	(Nigeria) Bartholomew Ogbeche	Willem II	26 August 2018	Free	
24	FW	(Uruguay) Juan Cruz Mascia	Plaza Colonia	27 August 2018	Free	
17	MF	(Ghana) Augustine Okrah	Al-Hilal	30 August 2018	Free	
6	MF	(Colombia) José David Leudo	Atlético Huila	29 August 2018	Free	
18	DF	(Croatia) Mato Grgić	NK Inter Zaprešić	1 September 2018	Free	
3	DF	(Croatia) Mislav Komorski	NK Inter Zaprešić	1 September 2018	Free	
9	MF	(Uruguay) Federico Gallego	Boston River	5 September 2018	Loan	
27	MF	(Greece) Panagiotis Triadis	Apollon Smyrnis	17 January 2019	Free	
TBD	DF	(India) Shouvik Ghosh	Mumbai City FC	18 January 2019	Free	

== Pre-season and friendlies ==
NorthEast United was rumoured to travel to Sweden for its preseason. The tour was cancelled and the club continued their preparations in India itself playing against teams like I-League champion Minerva Punjab and runner up NEROCA.

3 September 2018 1	NorthEast United	6–0	Guwahati Town	Guwahati, Assam
	Borges; Ogbeche Mascia; Khosla; Simranjit	Report

8 September 2018 2	NorthEast United	4–0	Laban S.C.	Guwahati, Assam
	Ogbeche; Borges; Okrah; Mascia	Report

15 September 2018 3	NEROCA	1–0	NorthEast United	Imphal, Manipur
14:00	Aryn 25'	Report		Stadium: Khuman Lampak Main Stadium

21 September 2018 4	Rainbow	0–4	NorthEast United	Kolkata, West Bengal
15:30		Report	Gallego; 13'; Ogbeche; 16' 21'; Leudo 44'	Stadium: Salt Lake training ground

25 September 2018 5	NorthEast United	1–0	Minerva Punjab	Guwahati, Assam
15:00 IST	Mascia 71' (pen.)	Report		Stadium: Indira Gandhi Athletic Stadium

6 October 2018 6	NorthEast United	5–1	Assam Police Blues	Guwahati, Assam
15:00 IST	Puia; Mascia; Khosla; Okrah	Report		Stadium: Indira Gandhi Athletic Stadium

16 November 2018 7	NorthEast United	2-0	Morning Star	Guwahati, Assam
15:00 IST	Okrah 28'; Khosla 88'	Report		Stadium: Indira Gandhi Athletic Stadium

== Indian Super League ==
Pos	Team	Pld	W	D	L	GF	GA	GD	Pts	Qualification
2	Goa	18	10	4	4	36	20	+16	34 (Note: Head-to-head standings: Bengaluru 6 pts, Goa 0 pts.)	Advance to ISL Playoffs
3	Mumbai City	18	9	3	6	25	20	+5	30	Advance to ISL Playoffs
4	NorthEast United	18	7	8	3	22	18	+4	29	Advance to ISL Playoffs
5	Jamshedpur	18	6	9	3	29	21	+8	27	
6	ATK	18	6	6	6	18	22	−4	24	

Source: Indian Super League
Rules for classification: 1) points; 2) head-to-head points; 3) head-to-head goal difference; 4) head-to-head goals scored; 5) goal difference; 5) number of goals scored; 6) fair play ranking; 6) drawing of lots

=== Results summary ===
Overall								Home						Away					
Pld	W	D	L	GF	GA	GD	Pts	W	D	L	GF	GA	GD	W	D	L	GF	GA	GD
18	7	8	3	22	18	+4	29	2	6	1	9	8	+1	5	2	2	13	10	+3

Last updated: 01 March 2019.
Source: Matches

=== 1st Half: Results by round ===
Round	1	2	3	4	5	6	7	8	9	10	11	12
Ground	H	A	A	H	A	H	H	A	A	H	H	A
Result	D	W	W	D	W	L	W	W	D	D	D	L

A = Away; H = Home; W = Win; D = Draw; L = Loss

=== 2nd Half: Results by round ===
Round	1	2	3	4	5	6
Ground	H	A	H	A	H	A
Result	W	L	D	W	D	D

A = Away; H = Home; W = Win; D = Draw; L = Loss

=== 1st Half: Matches ===
1 October 2018 1	NorthEast United	2–2	Goa	Guwahati
19:30 IST (UTC+5:30)	Gallego 8'; Bart 53'; Pereira (yellow card) 56'; Tlang (yellow card) 90'	Report	Coro 14', 39'; Jahouh (yellow card) 30'	Stadium: Indira Gandhi Athletic Stadium; Attendance: 18,321; Referee: R Venkatesh; Man of the Match: Ferran Corominas (Goa)

4 October 2018 2	ATK	0–1	NorthEast United	Kolkata
19:30 IST (UTC+5:30)	Halder (yellow card) 9'; Ralte (yellow card) 19' (yellow-red card) 32'; Johnson (yellow card) 55'; Lanza (yellow card) 76'	Report	Leudo (yellow card) 20'; Grgiç (yellow card) 44'; Borges 89'	Stadium: Vivekananda Yuba Bharati Krirangan; Attendance: 19,853; Referee: Tejas Nagvenkar; Man of the Match: John Johnson (ATK)

18 October 2018 3	Chennaiyin	3–4	NorthEast United	Chennai
19:30 IST (UTC+5:30)	Borges 5' (o.g.); Thoi 15', 32'; Calderón (yellow card) 82'	Report	Gallego (yellow card) 23'; Bart 29', 37', 39'; Borges 54'	Stadium: Jawaharlal Nehru Stadium; Attendance: 14,293; Referee: Umesh Bora; Man of the Match: Bartholomew Ogbeche (NEUFC)

25 October 2018 4	NorthEast United	1-1	Jamshedpur	Guwahati
19:30 IST (UTC+5:30)	Bart 20'; Borges (yellow card) 29'; Komorski (red card) 45'; Tlang (yellow card) 61'	Report	Farukh 49'	Stadium: Indira Gandhi Athletic Stadium; Attendance: 16,992; Referee: R Palmson Moses; Man of the Match: Farukh Choudhary (Jamshedpur)

30 October 2018 5	Delhi Dynamos	0-2	NorthEast United	Delhi
20:00 IST (UTC+5:30)	Tebar (yellow card) 59'; Kotal (yellow card) 64'	Report	Gallego 82'; Bart 90+3'	Stadium: Jawaharlal Nehru Stadium; Attendance: 12,342; Referee: Senthil Nathan S Man of the Match: Federico Gallego (NEUFC)

9 November 2018 6	NorthEast United	0-1	Mumbai City	Guwahati
20:00 IST (UTC+5:30)	Robert (yellow card) 45'; Grgić (yellow card) 68'	Report	Issoko 4'; Goian (yellow card) 9'; Singh (yellow card) 15'; Bose (yellow card) 85'; Mirabaje (yellow card) 90'	Stadium: Indira Gandhi Athletic Stadium; Attendance: 13,941; Referee: A Rowan; Man of the Match: Arnold Issoko (MCFC)

23 November 2018 7	NorthEast United	2-1	Kerala Blasters	Guwahati
20:00 IST (UTC+5:30)	Reagan (yellow card) 39'; Ogbeche 90+3'; Mascia 90+5'	Report	Pešić (yellow card) 35'; Poplatnik 73' (yellow card) 88'; Dheeraj (yellow card) 88'; Lalruatthara (yellow card) 90+4'	Stadium: Indira Gandhi Athletic Stadium; Attendance: 9,134; Referee: R Gupta; Man of the Match: Sandesh Jhingan (KBFC)

27 November 2018 8	Pune City	0-2	NorthEast United	Pune
20:00 IST (UTC+5:30)	Marcelinho (yellow card) 55'; Ashutosh Mehta (yellow card) 61'; Sahil Panwar (yellow card) 90'	Report	Bartholomew Ogbeche 23'; Provat Lakra (yellow card) 75'; Mascia 90+1'	Stadium: Shree Shiv Chhatrapati Sports Complex; Attendance: 2,941; Referee: Muhammad Taqi Aljaafari Bin Jahari; Man of the Match: Federico Gallego (NEUFC)

1 December 2018 9	Jamshedpur	0-0	NorthEast United	Jamshedpur
20:00 IST (UTC+5:30)		Report	Mislav Komorski (yellow card) 42'; Redeem Tlang (yellow card) 45'	Stadium: JRD Tata Sports Complex; Attendance: 21,847; Referee: R Venkatesh; Man of the Match: José David Leudo (NEUFC)

5 December 2018 10	NorthEast United	1-1	Bengaluru	Guwahati
20:00 IST (UTC+5:30)	Federico Gallego 64'; Bartholomew Ogbeche (yellow card) 71'	Report	Gurpreet Singh Sandhu (yellow card) 66'; Chencho Gyeltshen 90+2'	Stadium: Indira Gandhi Athletic Stadium; Attendance: 12,371; Referee: Coimbatore Ramaswamy Srikrishna; Man of the Match: Chencho Gyeltshen (Bengaluru)

8 December 2018 11	NorthEast United	0-0	ATK	Guwahati
20:00 IST (UTC+5:30)	Reagan Singh (yellow card) 72'	Report	Ankit Mukherjee (yellow card) 10'	Stadium: Indira Gandhi Athletic Stadium; Attendance: 10,231; Referee: Crystal John; Man of the Match: José David Leudo (NEUFC)

14 December 2018 12	Goa	5-1	NorthEast United	Goa
20:00 IST (UTC+5:30)	Ferran Corominas 59', 84'; Edu Bedia 69'; Hugo Boumous 71'; Miguel Palanca 90+1'	Report	Robert Lalthlamuana (yellow card) 24'; Reagan Singh (yellow card) 34'; Rowllin Borges (yellow card) 43'; Bartholomew Ogbeche 90'	Stadium: Fatorda Stadium; Attendance: 17,385; Referee: Coimbatore Ramaswamy Srikrishna; Man of the Match: Ferran Corominas (FC Goa)

=== 2nd Half: Matches ===
26 January 2019 13	NorthEast United	1-0	Chennaiyin	Guwahati
19:30 IST (UTC+5:30)	Komorski (yellow card) 12'; Ogbeche 87'	Report	Orlandi (yellow card) 6'	Stadium: Indira Gandhi Athletic Stadium; Attendance: 8,563; Referee: Mb Santhosh Kumar; Man of the Match: Bartholomew Ogbeche (NEUFC)

30 January 2019 14	Bengaluru	2-1	NorthEast United	Bengaluru
19:30 IST (UTC+5:30)	Komorski 14' (o.g.); Chencho 71'; Bheke (yellow card) 74'	Report	Grgić (yellow card) 28'; Leudo (yellow card) 45'; Gallego 60'	Stadium: Sree Kanteerava Stadium; Attendance: 11,970; Referee: Coimbatore Ramaswamy Srikrishna; Man of the Match: Gurpreet Singh Sandhu (Bengaluru)

7 February 2019 15	NorthEast United	1-1	Delhi Dynamos	Guwahati
19:30 IST (UTC+5:30)	Robert (yellow card) 61'; Ogbeche 71' (pen.)	Report	Tebar 67'; Gianni (yellow card) 90'	Stadium: Indira Gandhi Athletic Stadium; Attendance: 6,873; Referee: Pranjal Banerjee; Man of the Match: Panagiotis Triadis (NEUFC)

13 February 2019 16	Mumbai City	0-2	NorthEast United	Mumbai
19:30 IST (UTC+5:30)	Bastos (yellow card) 45'; Rafique (yellow card) 45'; Milan (yellow card) 69'	Report	Borges 4'; Ogbeche 33'; Ogbeche (yellow card) 37'; Leudo (yellow card) 56'; Gallego (yellow card) 81'	Stadium: Mumbai Football Arena; Attendance: 3,627; Referee: Adham Mohammad Tumah Makhadmeh; Man of the Match: Rowllin Borges (NEUFC)

20 February 2019 17	NorthEast United	1-1	Pune City	Guwahati
19:30 IST (UTC+5:30)	Gurwinder Singh (yellow card) 22'; Borges 47'; José David Leudo (yellow card) 88'; José David Leudo (red card) 89'; Mato Grgić (yellow card) 90'	Report	Martín Díaz (yellow card) 53'; Adil Khan (yellow card) 54'; Adil Khan 69'; Sahil Panwar (yellow card) 90'	Stadium: Indira Gandhi Athletic Stadium; Attendance: 11,473; Referee: Tejas Nagvenkar; Man of the Match: Rowllin Borges (NEUFC)

1 March 2019 18	Kerala Blasters	0-0	NorthEast United	Kochi
19:30 IST (UTC+5:30)	Jhingan (yellow card) 32'; Prasanth (yellow card) 84'	Report	Gurwinder (red card) 23'	Stadium: Jawaharlal Nehru; Attendance: 6,651; Referee: Rahul Kumar Gupta; Man of the Match: Lalthathanga Khawlhring (NEUFC)

=== Semi-finals ===
==== Leg-1 ====
7 March 2019 1	NorthEast United	2-1	Bengaluru	Guwahati
20:00 IST (UTC+5:30)	Tlang 20' (yellow card) 61'; Mascia (P) 90+4'	Report	Miku (yellow card) 41'; Xisco 82'; Khabra (yellow card) 90'	Stadium: Indira Gandhi Athletic Stadium; Attendance: 21,768; Referee: Mb Santhosh Kumar; Man of the Match: Jose Leudo (NEUFC)

==== Leg-2 ====
11 March 2019 2	Bengaluru	3-0 (Agg 4-2)	NorthEast United	Bengaluru
19:30 IST (UTC+5:30)	Bheke (yellow card) 63'; Miku 72'; Dimas (yellow card) 79' (goal) 87'; Luisma (yellow card) 86'; Chhetri 90'	Report	Tlang (yellow card) 90'	Stadium: Sree Kanteerava Stadium; Attendance: 21,636; Referee: Hamad Ali Yousef Abdulla Alali; Man of the Match: Miku (Bengaluru)

== Indian Super Cup ==
=== Round of 16 ===
April 2019 1	NorthEast United	Walkover	NEROCA	Bhubaneswar, Odisha
20:30 IST (UTC+5:30)				Stadium: Kalinga Stadium

=== Quarter-finals ===
April 2019 2	NorthEast United	1-2	Chennaiyin	Bhubaneswar, Odisha
20:30 IST (UTC+5:30)	Borges 9'	Report	Mailson 33'; Thapa 40'	Stadium: Kalinga Stadium

== Management ==
As of 17 August 2018.

Position	Name
Head Coach	(Netherlands) Eelco Schattorie
Assistant Coach	(Australia) Shaun Ontong
Goalkeeping Coach	(India) Joseph Sidy
Technical Advisor	(Israel) Avram Grant
Strength and conditioning coach	(Portugal) Mauro André Claro Martins
Physiotherapist	(India) Arvind Yadav

== Squad statistics ==
No.	Pos	Nat	Player	Total		Indian Super League		Indian Super Cup	
No.	Pos	Nat	Player	Apps	Goals	Apps	Goals	Apps	Goals
1	GK	(India) IND	Pawan Kumar	16	0	15+1	0	0	0
2	DF	(Colombia) COL	Janeiler Rivas	5	0	3+1	0	1	0
4	DF	(India) IND	Pawan Kumar	0	0	0	0	0	0
5	DF	(India) IND	Provat Lakra	6	0	2+4	0	0	0
6	MF	(Colombia) COL	José David Leudo	20	0	19	0	1	0
7	MF	(India) IND	Fanai Lalrempuia	2	0	2	0	0	0
8	FW	(India) IND	Girik Khosla	2	0	1	0	0+1	0
9	MF	(Uruguay) URU	Federico Gallego	20	4	20	4	0	0
10	FW	(Nigeria) NGR	Bartholomew Ogbeche	18	12	18	12	0	0
11	DF	(India) IND	Simranjit Singh	0	0	0	0	0	0
12	MF	(India) IND	Reagan Singh	19	0	17+1	0	1	0
13	GK	(India) IND	Rehenesh TP	5	0	5	0	0	0
14	MF	(India) IND	Rowllin Borges	20	5	19	4	1	1
16	DF	(India) IND	Gurwinder Singh	12	0	5+7	0	0	0
18	DF	(Croatia) CRO	Mato Grgić	20	0	19	0	1	0
19	DF	(India) IND	Robert Lalthlamuana	14	0	13+1	0	0	0
20	DF	(India) IND	Keegan Pereira	15	0	5+9	0	0+1	0
21	MF	(India) IND	Rupert Nongrum	0	0	0	0	0	0
22	MF	(India) IND	Redeem Tlang	19	1	17+2	1	0	0
23	MF	(India) IND	Nikhil Kadam	13	0	4+8	0	1	0
24	FW	(Uruguay) URU	Juan Cruz Mascia	16	3	7+8	3	1	0
27	MF	(Greece) GRE	Panagiotis Triadis	8	0	5+2	0	1	0
31	GK	(India) IND	Gurmeet	1	0	0	0	1	0
32	MF	(India) IND	Lalthathanga Khawlhring	21	0	13+7	0	1	0
-	MF	(India) IND	Seityasen Singh	0	0	0	0	0	0
26	DF	(India) IND	Shouvik Ghosh	3	0	1+1	0	1	0
Players who left NorthEast United during the season:
3	DF	(Croatia) CRO	Mislav Komorski (Injury)	10	0	10	0	0	0
15	FW	(India) IND	Kivi Zhimomi (on loan at TRAU F.C.)	0	0	0	0	0	0
17	MF	(Ghana) GHA	Augustine Okrah (Injury)	4	0	0+4	0	0	0

=== Top scorers ===
Rnk	No.	Nation	Player	Pos	Indian Super League	Indian Super Cup	Total
1	10	(Nigeria)	Bartholomew Ogbeche	FW	12	0	12
2	9	(Uruguay)	Federico Gallego	MF	4	0	4
3	14	(India)	Rowllin Borges	MF	4	1	5
4	24	(Uruguay)	Juan Cruz Mascia	MF	3	0	3
5	22	(India)	Redeem Tlang	MF	1	0	1
Totals					24	1	25

=== Disciplinary record ===
No.	Nation	Player	Pos	Yellow Card	Red Card
20	(India)	Keegan Pereira	DF	1	0
19	(India)	Robert Lalthlamuana	DF	3	0
12	(India)	Reagan Singh	DF	3	0
14	(India)	Rowllin Borges	MF	2	0
22	(India)	Redeem Tlang	MF	5	0
9	(Uruguay)	Federico Gallego	MF	2	0
5	(India)	Provat Lakra	DF	1	0
6	(Colombia)	José David Leudo	MF	4	1
6	(Nigeria)	Bartholomew Ogbeche	FW	2	0
18	(Croatia)	Mislav Komorski	DF	2	1
18	(Croatia)	Mato Grgić	DF	4	0
16	(India)	Gurwinder Singh	DF	1	1
Totals				30	3
