= 2016 NorthEast United FC season =

2016 season of NorthEast United FC

NorthEast United
2016 season
- Owner: John Abraham
- Head Coach: Nelo Vingada
- Stadium: Indira Gandhi Athletic Stadium
- ISL: 5th
- Top goalscorer: League: Emiliano Alfaro (5); All: Emiliano Alfaro (5)
- Highest home attendance: 32,844 vs Chennaiyin (20 October 2016)
- Lowest home attendance: 18,673 vs Pune City (22 November 2016)
- Average home league attendance: 26,729
Home colours	Away colours	Third colours

The 2016 NorthEast United FC season was the club's third season since its establishment in 2014 and their third season in the Indian Super League.

== Background ==
After the end of the 2014 ISL season, NorthEast United parted ways with their inaugural season head coach, Ricki Herbert. Soon after, César Farías, was named as the new head coach for the 2015 season. The season began for NorthEast United with a 3–1 loss to the Kerala Blasters on 6 October. The team ended the season with six wins through fourteen matches and almost qualified for the finals but were two points short.

== Transfers ==
=== Pre-season ===
==== In ====
Date	Position	Nationality	Name	From	Fee	Ref.
25 May 2016	GK	(India)	Subrata Pal	Mumbai City	Free	
25 May 2016	DF	(India)	Nirmal Chettri		Free	
25 May 2016	DF	(India)	Sumeet Passi	Sporting Goa	Free	
25 May 2016	MF	(India)	Rowllin Borges	Sporting Goa	?	
31 May 2016	DF	(Brazil)	Maílson	Voltaço	Free	
6 June 2016	FW	(Brazil)	Morais	São Bento	Free	
23 June 2016	MF	(India)	Fanai Lalrempuia	Pune City	Free	
24 June 2016	FW	(Uruguay)	Sasha Aneff	Syrianska	Free	
2 August 2016	DF	(Brazil)	Gustavo	Água Santa	Free	
3 August 2016	MF	(Brazil)	Wellington Priori	Gwangju	Free	
14 August 2016	MF	(Ivory Coast)	Romaric	Omonia	Free	
27 August 2016	FW	(Uruguay)	Emiliano Alfaro	Buriram United	Free	
30 August 2016	DF	(Brazil)	Fábio Neves	Gwangju	Free	
30 September 2016	FW	(Japan)	Robert Cullen	Seoul E-Land	Free	

==== Out ====
Date	Position	Nationality	Name	To	Fee	Ref.
1 January 2016	DF	(Argentina)	Carlos Javier López	Deportivo Anzoátegui	Free	
21 June 2016	MF	(India)	Boithang Haokip	Shillong Lajong	Loan return	
21 June 2016	DF	(India)	Aiborlang Khongjee	Shillong Lajong	Loan return	
5 July 2016	FW	(India)	Sanju Pradhan	Pune City	Free	
5 July 2016	DF	(India)	Yumnam Raju	Pune City	Free	
26 July 2016	MF	(Spain)	Bruno	Atlético Baleares	Free	
26 July 2016	DF	(Cameroon)	André Bikey	Pune City	Free	
2 August 2016	MF	(India)	Siam Hanghal	Bengaluru	Loan return	
16 August 2016	DF	(France)	Cédric Hengbart	Kerala Blasters	Free	
	GK	(France)	Gennaro Bracigliano			
	MF	(Portugal)	Silas	Cova da Piedade	Free	
	MF	(Portugal)	Simão			
	FW	(Ghana)	Francis Dadzie	Sporting Goa	Free	
	FW	(Senegal)	Diomansy Kamara			
	FW	(Senegal)	Victor Mendy			

==== Loan in ====
No.	Pos	Player	From	Start	End	Source
10	MF	(Japan) Katsumi Yusa	(India) Mohun Bagan	30 May 2016	31 December 2016	
20	MF	(India) Jerry Mawihmingthanga	(India) DSK Shivajians	1 July 2016	31 December 2016	
17	FW	(India) Lallianzuala Chhangte	(India) DSK Shivajians	1 July 2016	31 December 2016	
26	DF	(India) Shouvik Ghosh	(India) Mohun Bagan	1 July 2016	31 December 2016	
21	GK	(Brazil) Wellington de Lima Gomes	(Portugal) Marítimo	1 July 2016	31 December 2016	
37	DF	(India) Salam Ranjan Singh	(India) Bengaluru FC	30 August 2016	31 December 2016	

==== Released ====
Date	Position	Nationality	Name	Joined	Date
30 August 2016	FW	(Brazil)	Morais	Free Agent	

=== End-season ===
==== Out ====
List of players transferred or released from the club after 2016 Indian Super League season.

No.	Pos	Player	Transferred To	Fee	Date	Source
19	FW	(Argentina) Nicolás Vélez	(Thailand) Suphanburi	Free	1 January 2017	
22	DF	(Brazil) Gustavo Lazzaretti	(Brazil) Brusque	Undisclosed	1 January 2017	
5	MF	(Ivory Coast) Didier Zokora	Free Agent/Released		1 January 2017	
6	MF	(Ivory Coast) Romaric	Free Agent/Released		1 January 2017	
30	FW	(Japan) Robert Cullen	Free Agent/Released		1 January 2017	
7	FW	(Uruguay) Sasha Aneff	Free Agent/Released		1 January 2017	
—	MF	(Brazil) Fábio Neves	Free Agent/Released		1 January 2017	
3	MF	(Brazil) Wellington Priori	(Thailand) Pattaya United	Free	5 January 2017	
27	DF	(Brazil) Maílson Alves	(Brazil) Volta Redonda	Free	13 January 2017	
9	FW	(Uruguay) Emiliano Alfaro	(United Arab Emirates) Al-Fujairah	Free	18 January 2017	

==== Loan out ====
After the end of 2016 Indian Super League season majority of domestic players from NorthEast United were loaned by I-League clubs for 2016–17 season.

No.	Pos	Player	To	Start	End	Source
18	FW	(India) Holicharan Narzary	(India) DSK Shivajians	12 January 2017	30 June 2017	
1	GK	(India) Subrata Pal	(India) DSK Shivajians	12 January 2017	30 June 2017	
4	DF	(India) Nirmal Chettri	(India) DSK Shivajians	12 January 2017	30 June 2017	
15	FW	(India) Sumeet Passi	(India) DSK Shivajians	12 January 2017	30 June 2017	
11	MF	(India) Seityasen Singh	(India) DSK Shivajians	12 January 2017	30 June 2017	
12	DF	(India) Reagan Singh	(India) Mumbai F.C.	12 January 2017	30 June 2017	
13	GK	(India) Rehenesh TP	(India) East Bengal	12 January 2017	30 June 2017	
14	MF	(India) Rowllin Borges	(India) East Bengal	12 January 2017	30 June 2017	
16	DF	(India) Robin Gurung	(India) East Bengal	12 January 2017	30 June 2017	
45	MF	(India) Fanai Lalrempuia	(India) Minerva Punjab	12 January 2017	30 June 2017	

== Squad ==
Note: Flags indicate national team as defined under FIFA eligibility rules; some limited exceptions apply. Players may hold more than one non-FIFA nationality.

No.	Pos.	Nation	Player
1	GK	IND	Subrata Pal
3	MF	BRA	Wellington Priori
4	DF	IND	Nirmal Chettri
5	MF	CIV	Didier Zokora
6	MF	CIV	Romaric
7	FW	URU	Sasha Aneff
9	FW	URU	Emiliano Alfaro
10	MF	JPN	Katsumi Yusa (on loan from Mohun Bagan)
11	MF	IND	Seityasen Singh
12	DF	IND	Reagan Singh
13	GK	IND	Rehenesh TP
14	MF	IND	Rowllin Borges
15	FW	IND	Sumeet Passi

No.	Pos.	Nation	Player
16	DF	IND	Robin Gurung
17	FW	IND	Lallianzuala Chhangte (on loan from DSK Shivajians)
18	MF	IND	Holicharan Narzary
19	FW	ARG	Nicolás Vélez
20	MF	IND	Jerry Mawihmingthanga (on loan from DSK Shivajians)
21	GK	BRA	Wellington de Lima Gomes (on loan from Marítimo)
22	DF	BRA	Gustavo Lazzaretti
26	DF	IND	Shouvik Ghosh
27	DF	BRA	Mailson Alves
30	FW	JPN	Robert Cullen
37	DF	IND	Salam Ranjan Singh
45	MF	IND	Fanai Lalrempuia

== Indian Super League ==
Pos	Team	Pld	W	D	L	GF	GA	GD	Pts	Qualification
3	Delhi Dynamos	14	5	6	3	27	17	+10	21	Advance to ISL Play-offs
4	Atlético de Kolkata (C)	14	4	8	2	16	14	+2	20	Advance to ISL Play-offs
5	NorthEast United	14	5	3	6	14	14	0	18	
6	Pune City	14	4	4	6	13	16	−3	16	
7	Chennaiyin	14	3	6	5	20	25	−5	15	

Source: Indian Super League
Rules for classification: 1) points; 2) head-to-head points; 3) head-to-head goal difference; 4) goal difference; 5) number of goals scored; 6) play-off match
(C) Champions

=== Results summary ===
Overall								Home						Away					
Pld	W	D	L	GF	GA	GD	Pts	W	D	L	GF	GA	GD	W	D	L	GF	GA	GD
14	5	3	6	14	14	0	18	4	0	3	7	5	+2	1	3	3	7	9	−2

Last updated: 5 December 2016.
Source: Matches

=== Results by round ===
Round	1	2	3	4	5	6	7	8	9	10	11	12	13	14
Ground	H	H	A	A	A	H	H	H	A	A	H	A	H	A
Result	W	W	L	W	D	L	L	L	L	D	W	D	W	L

Updated to match(es) played on 5 December 2016. Source: Matches
A = Away; H = Home; W = Win; D = Draw; L = Loss

=== Matches ===
1 October 2016 1	NorthEast United	1–0	Kerala Blasters	Guwahati
19:00 IST (UTC+5:30)	Borges (yellow card) 34'; Yusa 55'	Report	Belfort (yellow card) 60'	Stadium: Indira Gandhi Athletic Stadium; Attendance: 27,629; Referee: Pranjal Banerji

4 October 2016 2	NorthEast United	2–0	Goa	Guwahati
19:00 IST (UTC+5:30)	Alfaro 20', 62' (yellow card) 32'; Lazzaretti (yellow card) 60'; Gurung (yellow card) 76'; Yusa (yellow card) 78'	Report	Desai (yellow card) 51'	Stadium: Indira Gandhi Athletic Stadium; Attendance: 27,816; Referee: CR Srikrishna

7 October 2016 3	Mumbai City	1–0	NorthEast United	Mumbai
19:00 IST (UTC+5:30)	Forlán 55' (pen.); Halder (yellow card) 70'	Report	Borges (yellow card) 34'; Nicolás Vélez (yellow card) 83'	Stadium: Mumbai Football Arena; Attendance: 6,147; Referee: Fernando Guerrero Ramirez

12 October 2016 4	Pune City	0–1	NorthEast United	Pune
19:00 IST (UTC+5:30)	Ferreira (yellow card) 15' (yellow-red card) 71'	Report	Vélez (yellow card) 7'; Chettri (red card) 36'; Alfaro 79'	Stadium: Balewadi Stadium; Attendance: 7,911; Referee: Fernando Guerrero Ramirez

15 October 2016 5	Delhi Dynamos	1–1	NorthEast United	Delhi
19:00 IST (UTC+5:30)	Rubén (yellow card) 7'; Lewis 38'; Gadze (yellow card) 45+2'; Tébar (yellow card) 53'	Report	Yusa (yellow card) 18'; Romaric (yellow card) 36'; Zokora (yellow card) 37'; Alfaro 51' (yellow card) 58'; Pal (yellow card) 86'	Stadium: Jawaharlal Nehru Stadium; Attendance: 27,463; Referee: Ali Abdulnabi

20 October 2016 6	NorthEast United	0–1	Chennaiyin	Guwahati
19:00 IST (UTC+5:30)	Wellington.P (yellow card) 59'	Report	Mendy (yellow card) 35'; Succi 49'; Lalrinzuala (yellow card) 83'	Stadium: Indira Gandhi Athletic Stadium; Attendance: 32,844; Referee: Umesh Bora

28 October 2016 7	NorthEast United	1–2	Atlético de Kolkata	Guwahati
19:00 IST (UTC+5:30)	Alfaro 39' (yellow card) 45+1'	Report	Borja (yellow card) 27'; Pearson (yellow card) 43'; Mondal (yellow card) 55'; Postiga 63'; Belencoso 82'; Lalthlamuana (yellow card) 90+1'	Stadium: Indira Gandhi Athletic Stadium; Attendance: 30,033; Referee: Sandro Ricci

5 November 2016 8	NorthEast United	0–1	Mumbai City	Guwahati
19:00 IST (UTC+5:30)	Zokora (yellow card) 50'; Yusa (yellow card) 50'; Alfaro (yellow card) 63'; Chettri (yellow card) 90+1'	Report	J.Singh 45'; Ralte (yellow card) 49'; Gomes (yellow card) 90'	Stadium: Indira Gandhi Athletic Stadium; Attendance: 29,989; Referee: O.P. Thakur

11 November 2016 9	Goa	2–1	NorthEast United	Goa
19:00 IST (UTC+5:30)	Tavora (yellow card) 53' (yellow-red card) 72'; Almeida (yellow card) 61'; Singh 62'; Fernandes 90+4' (yellow card) 90+5'	Report	S.Singh 50'; Narzary (yellow card) 64'	Stadium: Fatorda Stadium; Attendance: 16,317; Referee: Santhosh Kumar

17 November 2016 10	Atlético de Kolkata	1–1	NorthEast United	Kolkata
19:00 IST (UTC+5:30)	Vélez 5'; Borges (yellow card) 32'; Chettri (yellow card) 84'; Pal (yellow card) 90+5'	Summary	Hume 90'	Stadium: Rabindra Sarobar Stadium; Attendance: 12,426; Referee: Umesh Bora

22 November 2016 11	NorthEast United	1–0	Pune City	Guwahati
19:00 IST (UTC+5:30)	Romaric (yellow card) 45' (goal) 81'; Borges (yellow card) 54'; Zokora (yellow card) 55'	Summary	Jonatan (yellow card) 45+2'; Sissoko (yellow card) 45+3'; Izumi (yellow card) 52'	Stadium: Indira Gandhi Athletic Stadium; Attendance: 18,673; Referee: Nick Waldron

26 November 2016 12	Chennaiyin	3–3	NorthEast United	Chennai
19:00 IST (UTC+5:30)	Dudu 34', 45+1', 81'; Hanghal (yellow card) 88'; Wadoo (yellow card) 90'	Summary	Vélez 38', 51' (yellow card) 90'; Romaric (yellow card) 90+1'; Ghosh 90+6'	Stadium: Jawaharlal Nehru Stadium; Attendance: 25,235; Referee: Muhd Jahari

30 November 2016 13	NorthEast United	2-1	Delhi Dynamos	Guwahati
19:00 IST (UTC+5:30)	Se.Singh 60'; Romaric 71'; TP (yellow card) 88'; Alfaro (yellow card) 90+4'	Summary	Rubén (yellow card) 31'; Edathodika (yellow card) 62'; Marcelinho (yellow card) 90+1' (goal) 90+3'	Stadium: Indira Gandhi Athletic Stadium; Attendance: 20,120; Referee: CR Srikrishna

4 December 2016 14	Kerala Blasters	1-0	NorthEast United	Kochi
19:00 IST (UTC+5:30)	Vineeth (yellow card) 30' (goal) 66'; Anto (yellow card) 33'; Ahmed (yellow card) 41'; Jhingan (yellow card) 61'; Belfort (yellow card) 79'	Summary	Chettri (yellow card) 36'; Alfaro (yellow card) 61'; Romaric (yellow card) 89'; Singh (yellow card) 90'	Stadium: Jawaharlal Nehru Stadium; Attendance: 55,148; Referee: Muhad Jahari

== Squad statistics ==
As of Match played 4 December 2016

=== Appearances and goals ===
No.	Pos	Nat	Player	Total		Indian Super League	
No.	Pos	Nat	Player	Apps	Goals	Apps	Goals
1	GK	(India) IND	Subrata Pal	11	0	11	0
2	DF	(India) IND	Salam Ranjan Singh	2	0	2	0
3	MF	(Brazil) BRA	Wellington Priori	12	0	3+9	0
4	DF	(India) IND	Nirmal Chettri	8	0	7+1	0
5	MF	(Ivory Coast) CIV	Didier Zokora	14	0	11+3	0
6	MF	(Ivory Coast) CIV	Romaric	12	2	11+1	2
7	FW	(Uruguay) URU	Sasha Aneff	1	0	0+1	0
8	FW	(Japan) JPN	Robert Cullen	8	0	2+6	0
9	FW	(Uruguay) URU	Emiliano Alfaro	13	5	13	5
10	MF	(Japan) JPN	Katsumi Yusa	14	1	13+1	1
11	MF	(India) IND	Seityasen Singh	9	2	7+2	2
12	DF	(India) IND	Reagan Singh	8	0	5+3	0
13	GK	(India) IND	Rehenesh TP	3	0	2+1	0
14	MF	(India) IND	Rowllin Borges	13	0	13	0
15	FW	(India) IND	Sumeet Passi	4	0	1+3	0
16	DF	(India) IND	Robin Gurung	8	0	8	0
17	FW	(India) IND	Lallianzuala Chhangte	1	0	0+1	0
18	MF	(India) IND	Holicharan Narzary	12	0	8+4	0
19	FW	(Argentina) ARG	Nicolás Vélez	11	3	10+1	3
20	MF	(India) IND	Jerry Mawihmingthanga	1	0	0+1	0
21	GK	(Brazil) BRA	Wellington de Lima Gomes	2	0	1+1	0
22	DF	(Brazil) BRA	Gustavo	11	0	11	0
26	DF	(India) IND	Shouvik Ghosh	6	1	5+1	1
27	DF	(Brazil) BRA	Maílson	9	0	9	0
45	MF	(India) IND	Fanai Lalrempuia	2	0	1+1	0
Players who left NorthEast United due to injury during the season:

=== Goal scorers ===
Place	Position	Nation	Number	Name	Indian Super League	Total
1	FW	(Uruguay)	9	Emiliano Alfaro	5	5
2	FW	(Argentina)	19	Nicolás Vélez	3	3
3	MF	(India)	11	Seityasen Singh	2	2
3	MF	(Ivory Coast)	6	Romaric	2	2
5	MF	(Japan)	10	Katsumi Yusa	1	1
5	DF	(India)	26	Shouvik Ghosh	1	1
				TOTALS	14	14

=== Disciplinary record ===
Number	Nation	Position	Name	Indian Super League		Total	
Number	Nation	Position	Name	Yellow card	Red card	Yellow card	Red card
9	(Uruguay)	FW	Emiliano Alfaro	6	0	6	0
6	(Ivory Coast)	MF	Romaric	4	0	4	0
14	(India)	MF	Rowllin Borges	4	0	4	0
4	(India)	DF	Nirmal Chettri	3	1	3	1
5	(Ivory Coast)	MF	Didier Zokora	3	0	3	0
10	(Japan)	MF	Katsumi Yusa	3	0	3	0
19	(Argentina)	FW	Nicolás Vélez	3	0	3	0
1	(India)	GK	Subrata Pal	2	0	2	0
3	(Brazil)	DF	Wellington Priori	1	0	1	0
12	(India)	DF	Reagan Singh	1	0	1	0
13	(India)	GK	Rehenesh TP	1	0	1	0
16	(India)	DF	Robin Gurung	1	0	1	0
18	(India)	MF	Holicharan Narzary	1	0	1	0
22	(Brazil)	DF	Gustavo	1	0	1	0
			TOTALS	34	1	34	1
