= 2020–21 NorthEast United FC season =

2020–21 season of NorthEast United FC

NorthEast United
2020–21 season
- Owner: John Abraham
- Head Coach: Gerard Nus (until 12 February 2021); Khalid Jamil (interim)
- Stadium: Tilak Maidan Stadium, Goa (Note: Due to the COVID-19 pandemic in India, the 2020–21 Indian Super League would be entirely held in Goa, inside closed doors and NorthEast United FC has been allotted the Tilak Maidan Stadium as their home ground for the season.)
- Indian Super League: 3rd
- Play-offs: Semi-final
- Super Cup: Cancelled
- Top goalscorer: League: Luís Machado (7); All: Luís Machado (7)
Home colours	Away colours	Third colours

The 2020–21 NorthEast United FC season was the club's seventh season since its establishment in 2014 and their seventh season in the Indian Super League.

== Players ==
Current squad of the club:

Squad No.	Name	Nationality	Position(s)	Date of Birth (Age)
Goalkeepers
1	Subhasish Roy Chowdhury	(India)	GK	27 September 1986 (age 39)
31	Gurmeet Singh	(India)	GK	3 December 1999 (age 26)
44	Nikhil Deka	(India)	GK	13 October 2002 (age 23)
51	Sanjiban Ghosh	(India)	GK	6 July 1991 (age 34)
Defenders
2	Wayne Vaz	(India)	CB / RB / DM	28 July 1994 (age 31)
16	Dylan Fox	(Australia) / (Northern Ireland)	CB / DM	15 April 1994 (age 32)
19	Benjamin Lambot	(Belgium)	CB / DM	2 May 1987 (age 39)
25	Nabin Rabha	(India)	CB / DM	11 December 1996 (age 29)
29	Nim Dorjee Tamang	(India)	CB / RB	28 October 1995 (age 30)
66	Mashoor Shereef	(India)	CB / CF / RW / LB / LM / CM	1 April 1991 (age 35)
4	Provat Lakra	(India)	LB / RB	12 August 1997 (age 28)
5	Gurjinder Kumar	(India)	LB / CB	10 October 1990 (age 35)
12	Ashutosh Mehta	(India)	RB / RM / RW	21 February 1992 (age 34)
29	Ponif Vaz	(India)	RB	4 October 1992 (age 33)
33	Rakesh Pradhan (On loan at Odisha FC)	(India)	RB / LB	2 August 1997 (age 28)
Midfielders
6	Khassa Camara	(Mauritania) / (France)	DM / CM / RB	22 October 1992 (age 33)
8	Imran Khan	(India)	DM / CM	1 March 1995 (age 31)
10	Federico Gallego	(Uruguay)	AM / RM / LM	13 June 1990 (age 35)
77	Rochharzela	(India)	AM / LM	15 April 1998 (age 28)
23	Fanai Lalrempuia	(India)	CM	11 May 1996 (age 30)
43	Pragyan Gogoi	(India)	CM	25 January 1999 (age 27)
45	Lalengmawia	(India)	CM / AM / LW	17 October 2000 (age 25)
Forwards
7	Ninthoinganba Meetei	(India)	RW / LW	13 July 2001 (age 24)
50	Britto PM	(India)	RW / RM	15 March 1993 (age 33)
20	Luís Machado	(Portugal)	LW / RW / AM	4 November 1992 (age 33)
11	Idrissa Sylla	(Guinea)	CF / RW / LW	13 December 1990 (age 35)
15	V.P. Suhair	(India)	CF / RW / RM	27 July 1992 (age 33)
27	Lalkhawpuimawia	(India)	CF / LM	8 January 1992 (age 34)
26	Deshorn Brown	(Jamaica)	FW	22 December 1990 (age 30)

== Transfers ==
=== In ===
No.	Pos.	Player	From	Fee
11	FW	(Guinea) Idrissa Sylla	(Belgium) SV Zulte Waregem	Free agent
26	FW	(Jamaica) Deshorn Brown	Bengaluru FC	Free agent
20	FW	(Portugal) Luís Machado	(Portugal) Moreirense FC	Free agent
19	DF	(Belgium) Benjamin Lambot	(Cyprus) Nea Salamina Famagusta	Free agent
16	DF	(Australia) Dylan Fox	(Australia) Central Coast Mariners	Free agent
9	FW	(Ghana) Kwesi Appiah	(England) AFC Wimbledon	Free agent
6	MF	(Mauritania) Khassa Camara	(Greece) Xanthi	Free agent
8	MF	(India) Imran Khan	NEROCA FC	Free agent
77	MF	(India) Rochharzela	Aizawl FC	Free agent
15	FW	(India) V.P. Suhair	Mohun Bagan	Free agent
5	DF	(India) Gurjinder Kumar	Mohun Bagan	Free agent
12	DF	(India) Ashutosh Mehta	Mohun Bagan	Free agent
50	FW	(India) Britto PM	Mohun Bagan	Free agent
27	FW	(India) Lalkhawpuimawia	Churchill Brothers FC	Free agent
29	DF	(India) Ponif Vaz	Churchill Brothers FC	Free agent
25	DF	(India) Nabin Rabha	Shillong Lajong	Free agent
66	DF	(India) Mashoor Shereef	Chennai City FC	Free agent
51	GK	(India) Sanjiban Ghosh	Chennaiyin FC	Free agent
43	MF	(India) Pragyan Gogoi	Kerala Blasters	Free agent
44	GK	(India) Nikhil Deka	NorthEast United U18	Free agent

== Competitions ==
=== Pre-season and friendlies ===
11 November 2020 Friendly	NorthEast United	0–0	Jamshedpur	Candolim
16:00 IST (UTC+05:30)				Stadium: Candolim Panchayat Ground

14 November 2020 Friendly	NorthEast United	2–1	Hyderabad	Candolim
16:00 IST (UTC+05:30)	Appiah; Machado	Report	Santana	Stadium: Candolim Panchayat Ground

=== Indian Super League ===
==== League table ====
Pos	Team	Pld	W	D	L	GF	GA	GD	Pts	Qualification
1	Mumbai City (L, C)	20	12	4	4	35	18	+17	40	Qualification to ISL playoffs and 2022 AFC Champions League group stage
2	ATK Mohun Bagan (Note: As the Premiers Mumbai City won the ISL playoffs, the regular season runners-up qualified for 2022 AFC Cup play-off round.)	20	12	4	4	28	15	+13	40	Qualification to ISL playoffs and 2022 AFC Cup play-off round
3	NorthEast United	20	8	9	3	31	25	+6	33	Qualification to ISL playoffs
4	Goa	20	7	10	3	31	23	+8	31	Qualification to ISL playoffs
5	Hyderabad	20	6	11	3	27	19	+8	29	

Source: Indian Super League
Rules for classification: 1) points; 2) head-to-head points; 3) head-to-head goal difference; 4) head-to-head goals scored; 5) goal difference; 6) number of goals scored; 7) fair play ranking; 8) drawing of lots
(C) Champions; (L) League Winners' Shield Winners

==== Results summary ====
Overall								Home						Away					
Pld	W	D	L	GF	GA	GD	Pts	W	D	L	GF	GA	GD	W	D	L	GF	GA	GD
20	8	9	3	31	25	+6	33	5	3	2	15	10	+5	3	6	1	16	15	+1

==== Results by matchday ====
Matchday	1	2	3	4	5	6	7	8	9	10	11	12	13	14	15	16	17	18	19	20
Ground	H	A	A	H	A	H	H	A	A	H	H	A	H	A	H	A	H	A	A	H
Result	W	D	D	W	D	D	L	D	L	L	D	W	W	W	D	D	W	D	W	W

Updated to match(es) played on 26 February 2021. Source: Indian Super League
A = Away; H = Home; W = Win; D = Draw; L = Loss

==== Matches ====
21 November 2020 1	NorthEast United	1–0	Mumbai City	Vasco
19:30 IST (UTC+05:30)	Appiah 49' (pen.); Mehta (yellow card) 84'; Gallego (yellow card) 90'	Report	Golui (yellow card) 37'; Jahouh (red card) 43'; Cy (yellow card) 90'	Stadium: Tilak Maidan Stadium; Referee: R Venkatesh; Man of the Match: Khassa Camara

26 November 2020 2	Kerala Blasters	2–2	NorthEast United	Bambolim
19:30 IST (UTC+05:30)	Cido 5'; Rohit (yellow card) 37'; Hooper 45' (pen.); Seityasen (yellow card) 49'	Report	Appiah 51'; Gurjinder (yellow card) 72'; Sylla 90'	Stadium: GMC Athletic Stadium; Referee: Ranjit Baksi; Man of the Match: Dylan Fox (NorthEast United)

30 November 2020 3	Goa	1–1	NorthEast United	Margao
19:30 IST	Angulo 43'	Report	Sylla 40' (pen.); Camara (yellow card) 88'	Stadium: Fatorda Stadium; Attendance: 0 Referee: Crystal John; Man of the Match: Lalengmawia (NorthEast United)

5 December 2020 4	NorthEast United	2–0	SC East Bengal	Vasco
19:30 IST (UTC+05:30)	Mehta (yellow card) 2'; Surchandra 33' (o.g.); Chhara 90'	Report	Lyngdoh (yellow card) 84'; Sehnaj (yellow card) 88'	Stadium: Tilak Maidan Stadium; Referee: Santosh Kumar; Man of the Match: Benjamin Lambot (NorthEast United)

8 December 2020 5	Bengaluru FC	2–2	NorthEast United	Fatorda, Goa
19:30 IST (UTC+05:30)	Juanan 13'; Bheke (yellow card) 21'; Paartalu (yellow card) 26'; Singh 70'	Report	Machado 4', 78'; Chhara (yellow card) 32'; Gurjinder (yellow card) 36'; Camara (yellow card) 73'; Ninthoi (yellow card) 80'; Gurmeet (yellow card) 83'; Britto (yellow card) 90'	Stadium: Fatorda Stadium; Referee: Tejas Nagvenkar; Man of the Match: Luis Machado (NorthEast United)

13 December 2020 6	Northeast United	0–0	Chennaiyin	Vasco
17:00 IST	Machado (yellow card) 36'; Lambot (yellow card) 81'	Report		Stadium: Tilak Maidan Stadium; Referee: Tejas Nagvenkar; Man of the Match: Khassa Camara (Northeast United)

18 December 2020 7	NorthEast United	0–1	Jamshedpur	Vasco
19:30 IST (UTC+05:30)	Camara (yellow card) 43'; Mehta (yellow card) 85'	Report	Jadhav 53'; Rahman (yellow card) 64'; Hartley (yellow card) 68'; Mandi (yellow card) 90'; Lallawmawma (yellow card) 90'	Stadium: Tilak Maidan Stadium; Referee: A Rowan; Man of the Match: Hartley (Jamshedpur)

22 December 2020 7	Odisha	2–2	NorthEast United	Bambolim
19:30 IST	Maurício (yellow card) 19' (goal) 23'; Onwu (yellow card) 32'; Vinit (yellow card) 42'; Arshdeep (yellow card) 65'; Cole 67'	Report	Fox (yellow card) 17'; Lambot 45'; Gurjinder (yellow card) 55'; Appiah 65' (pen.); Ninthoi (yellow card) 84'	Stadium: GMC Athletic Stadium; Referee: Pratik Mondal; Man of the Match: Cole (Odisha)

3 January 2021 9	ATK Mohun Bagan	2–0	NorthEast United	Margao, Goa
19:30 IST	Williams (yellow card) 25'; Bose (yellow card) 39'; McHugh (yellow card) 45+2'; Krishna 51'; Lambot 57' (o.g.); Das (yellow card) 58'; Halder (yellow card) 68'	Report	Gallego (yellow card) 62'	Stadium: Fatorda Stadium; Attendance: 0 (Note: Match was played behind closed doors due to government restrictions regarding the COVID-19 pandemic in India.); Referee: Tejas Nagvenkar; Man of the Match: Roy Krishna (ATK Mohun Bagan)

8 January 2021 10	NorthEast United	2–4	Hyderabad	Vasco
19:30 IST (UTC+05:30)	Shereef (yellow card) 6'; Machado (yellow card) 40'; Gallego 45' (pen.); Lambot 45+1'	Report	Santana 3'; Chianese 36'; Rai (yellow card) 41'; Narzary (yellow card) 44'; Mishra (yellow card) 63'; Colaco 85', 90+3'; Onaindia (yellow card) 88'	Stadium: Tilak Maidan Stadium; Attendance: 0 Referee: Rahul Kumar Gupta; Man of the Match: Chianese (Hyderabad)

12 January 2021 11	NorthEast United	1–1	Bengaluru	Vasco
19:30 IST	Machado 27'	Report	Paartalu (yellow card) 29'; Bheke 50'	Stadium: Tilak Maidan Stadium; Attendance: 0 Referee: Tejas Nagvenkar; Man of the Match: Lalengmawia (NorthEast United)

17 January 2021 12	Jamshedpur	1–2	NorthEast United	Vasco
19:30 IST	Amarjit (yellow card) 19'; Mobashir (yellow card) 62'; Gahlot (yellow card) 71'; Hartley 89'; Valskis (yellow card) 90'	Report	Mehta 36'; Brown 61' (yellow card) 65'; Apuia (yellow card) 69'	Stadium: Tilak Maidan Stadium; Attendance: 0 Referee: Crystal John; Man of the Match: Federico Gallego (NEUFC)

26 January 2021 13	NorthEast United	2–1	ATK Mohun Bagan	Margao, Goa
19:30 IST	Gurjinder (yellow card) 49'; Machado 60'; Gallego 81'; Nim (yellow card) 90'	Report	Krishna 72'; Pronay (yellow card) 73'	Stadium: Fatorda Stadium; Attendance: 0 Referee: Crystal John; Man of the Match: Federico Gallego (NEUFC)

30 January 2021 14	Mumbai City	1–2	NorthEast United	Bambolim
19:30 IST	Ogbeche (yellow card) 51'; Ahmed Jahouh (yellow card) 55'; Golui (yellow card) 73'; Le Fondre 85'	Report	Brown 6' 9'; Lakra (yellow card) 48'; Nim (yellow card) 71'; Luis Machado (yellow card) 90'	Stadium: GMC Athletic Stadium; Referee: Tejas Nagvenkar; Man of the Match: Deshorn Brown (NEUFC)

4 February 2021 15	NorthEast United	2–2	Goa	Margao
19:30 IST	Gallego 41' (pen.), pen.'; Mehta (yellow card) 66'; Camara (yellow card) 84'; Sylla (yellow card) 90+4'	Report	Jesuraj 21'; Kumar 80' (o.g.)	Stadium: Fatorda Stadium; Attendance: 0 Referee: Rowan Arumughan

7 February 2021 16	Hyderabad	0–0	NorthEast United	Vasco
19:30 IST (UTC+05:30)	Sandaza (yellow card) 20'; Mishra (yellow card) 84'	Report		Stadium: Tilak Maidan Stadium; Attendance: 0 Referee: Harish Kundu; Man of the Match: Lalengmawia (NorthEast United)

14 February 2021 17	NorthEast United	3–1	Odisha	Vasco
17:00 IST	Machado 9', 24'; Brown 19'; Kumar (yellow card) 71' (yellow-red card) 85'	Report	Bora (yellow card) 7'; Tratt (yellow card) 16'; Dhot (yellow card) 30'; Inman 45+1'; Mawihmingthanga (yellow card) 85'; Maurício (yellow card) 90+1'	Stadium: Tilak Maidan Stadium; Attendance: 0 Referee: Banerjee Pranjal

18 February 2021 18	Chennaiyin	3–3	NorthEast United	Bambolim
19:30 IST	Chhangte 8', 51'; Manuel Lanzarote 50' (pen.)	Report	Khan 14'; Brown 43'; Luís Machado 90+4' (pen.)	Stadium: GMC Athletic Stadium; Attendance: 0 Referee: Banerjee Pranjal

23 February 2021 19	East Bengal	1–2	NorthEast United	Margao
19:30 IST	Gaikwad (yellow card) 45' (yellow-red card) 71'; Neville (yellow card) 45'; Rafique (yellow card) 69'; Mukherjee (yellow card) 84'; Golui 87'	Report	Suhair 48'; Golui 55' (o.g.)	Stadium: Fatorda Stadium; Attendance: 0 Referee: Rahul Kumar Gupta; Man of the Match: V.P. Suhair (NorthEast United)

26 February 2021 20	NorthEast United	2–0	Kerala Blasters	Vasco
19:30 IST	Suhair 34'; Lalengmawia 45+1'; Khan (yellow card) 60'; Britto (yellow card) 65'	Report		Stadium: Tilak Maidan Stadium; Attendance: 0 Referee: Crystal John

==== Play-offs ====
6 March 2021 Semi-finals 1st leg	NorthEast United	1–1	ATK Mohun Bagan	Bambolim
19:30 IST	Ashutosh (yellow card) 82'; Sylla 90+4'	Report	Williams 34'; Hernández (yellow card) 81'	Stadium: GMC Stadium; Attendance: 0 Referee: Crystal John

9 March 2021 Semi-finals 2nd leg	ATK Mohun Bagan	2–1 (3–2 agg.)	NorthEast United	Margao
19:30 IST	Williams 38'; Singh 68'	Report	Mashoor (yellow card) 30'; Suhair 74'; Machado (penalty missed) 83'	Stadium: Fatorda Stadium; Attendance: 0 Referee: Rahul Kumar Gupta

== Squad statistics ==
=== Appearance and goals ===
No.	Pos	Nat	Player	Total		Indian Super League	
No.	Pos	Nat	Player	Apps	Goals	Apps	Goals
1	GK	(India) IND	Subhasish Roy Chowdhury	15	0	15	0
3	DF	(India) IND	Wayne Vaz	0	0	0	0
4	DF	(India) IND	Provat Lakra	11	0	11	0
6	DF	(India) IND	Gurjinder Kumar	18	0	18	0
6	MF	(Mauritania) MTN	Khassa Camara	21	0	21	0
7	FW	(India) IND	Ninthoinganba Meetei	13	0	13	0
8	MF	(India) IND	Imran Khan	6	1	6	1
10	MF	(Uruguay) URU	Federico Gallego	16	4	16	4
11	FW	(Guinea) GUI	Idrissa Sylla	18	3	18	3
12	DF	(India) IND	Ashutosh Mehta	18	1	18	1
15	FW	(India) IND	V.P. Suhair	18	3	18	3
16	DF	(Australia) AUS	Dylan Fox	21	0	21	0
19	DF	(Belgium) BEL	Benjamin Lambot	21	2	21	2
20	FW	(Portugal) POR	Luís Machado	22	7	22	7
23	MF	(India) IND	Fanai Lalrempuia	9	0	9	0
25	DF	(India) IND	Nabin Rabha	0	0	0	0
26	FW	(Jamaica) JAM	Deshorn Brown	10	5	10	5
27	FW	(India) IND	Lalkhawpuimawia	0	0	0	0
29	DF	(India) IND	Nim Dorjee Tamang	7	0	7	0
31	GK	(India) IND	Gurmeet Singh	8	0	8	0
43	MF	(India) IND	Pragyan Gogoi	2	0	2	0
44	GK	(India) IND	Nikhil Deka	0	0	0	0
45	MF	(India) IND	Lalengmawia	22	1	22	1
50	FW	(India) IND	Britto PM	11	0	11	0
51	GK	(India) IND	Sanjiban Ghosh	0	0	0	0
54	DF	(India) IND	Ponif Vaz	0	0	0	0
66	DF	(India) IND	Mashoor Shereef	11	0	11	0
77	MF	(India) IND	Rochharzela	12	1	12	1
Players who left NorthEast United during the season
–	FW	(Ghana) GHA	Kwesi Appiah(injured)	8	3	6+2	3
–	DF	(India) IND	Rakesh Pradhan(On loan at Odisha FC)	1	0	1	0

=== Goal scorers ===
Rank	No.	Pos.	Player	Indian Super League	Play-offs	Total
1	20	FW	(Portugal) Luis Machado	7	0	7
2	20	FW	(Jamaica) Deshorn Brown	5	0	5
3	10	MF	(Uruguay) Federico Gallego	4	0	4
6	9	FW	(Ghana) Kwesi Appiah	3	0	3
6	11	FW	(Guinea) Idrissa Sylla	2	1	3
6	15	FW	(India) V.P. Suhair	2	1	3
7	19	DF	(Belgium) Benjamin Lambot	2	0	2
11	8	MF	(India) Imran Khan	1	0	1
11	12	DF	(India) Ashutosh Mehta	1	0	1
11	45	MF	(India) Lalengmawia	1	0	1
11	77	MF	(India) Rochharzela	1	0	1
Own goals				2	0	2
Total				31	2	33

Last updated: 9 March 2021.
Source: Fbref

=== Assists ===
Rank	No.	Pos.	Player	Indian Super League	Play-offs	Total
1	10	MF	(Uruguay) Federico Gallego	6	0	6
2	12	DF	(India) Ashutosh Mehta	2	0	2
2	77	MF	(India) Rochharzela	2	0	2
2	20	FW	(Portugal) Luis Machado	1	1	2
3	5	DF	(India) Gurjinder Kumar	1	0	1
3	15	FW	(India) V.P. Suhair	1	0	1
3	29	DF	(India) Nim Dorjee Tamang	1	0	1
3	25	FW	(Jamaica) Deshorn Brown	1	0	1
3	20	DF	(Australia) Dylan Fox	1	0	1
3	6	MF	(Mauritania) Khassa Camara	1	0	1
Total				17	1	18

Last updated: 9 March 2021.
Source: Fbref

=== Clean sheets ===
Rank	No.	Pos.	Player	Indian Super League	Play-offs	Total
1	1	GK	(India) Subhasish Roy	3	0	3
2	31	GK	(India) Gurmeet Singh	2	0	2
Total				5	0	5

Last updated: 9 March 2021.
Source: Fbref

=== Disciplinary record ===
No.	Nation	Player	Pos	League		
No.	Nation	Player	Pos	Booked	(yellow card) (yellow-red card)	Sent off (straight red)
12	(India)	Ashutosh Mehta	DF	5	0	0
5	(India)	Gurjinder Kumar	DF	4	1	0
6	(Mauritania)	Khassa Camara	MF	4	0	0
20	(Portugal)	Luís Machado	FW	3	0	0
66	(India)	Mashoor Shereef	DF	3	0	0
7	(India)	Ninthoinganba Meetei	MF	2	0	0
29	(India)	Nim Dorjee Tamang	DF	2	0	0
10	(Uruguay)	Federico Gallego	MF	2	0	0
31	(India)	Gurmeet Singh	GK	1	0	0
50	(India)	Britto PM	MF	1	0	0
4	(India)	Provat Lakra	DF	1	0	0
45	(India)	Lalengmawia	MF	1	0	0
26	(Jamaica)	Deshorn Brown	FW	1	0	0
77	(India)	Rochharzela	MF	1	0	0
16	(Australia)	Dylan Fox	DF	1	0	0
19	(Belgium)	Benjamin Lambot	DF	1	0	0
Totals				36	1	0
