= Lalthathanga Khawlhring =

Indian footballer

Puitea
Personal information
- Full name: Lalthathanga Khawlhring
- Date of birth: 30 March 1998 (age 28)
- Place of birth: Aizawl, Mizoram, India
- Height: 1.69 m (5 ft 7 in)
- Position: Central midfielder

Team information
- Current team: Odisha
- Number: 7

Youth career
- 2016: Bethlehem Vengthlang
- 2016–2017: DSK Shivajians

Senior career*
Years	Team	Apps	(Gls)
2016–2017	DSK Shivajians	4	(0)
2017–2020	NorthEast United	29	(0)
2017–2018	→ Aizawl (loan)	17	(1)
2020–2022	Kerala Blasters	36	(1)
2023	ATK Mohun Bagan	8	(1)
2023–	Odisha	35	(2)
- * Club domestic league appearances and goals as of 12:33, 12 December 2024 (UTC)

Lalthathanga Khawlhring (born 30 March 1998), commonly known as Puitea, is an Indian professional footballer who plays as a midfielder for Indian Super League club Odisha, which he captains.

== Club career ==
=== Bethlehem Vengthlang ===
Born in Mizoram, Lalthathanga began his career with Bethlehem Vengthlang in the Mizoram Premier League before joining DSK Shivajians's academy. After the 2015–16 season, Lalthathanga was named as the best midfielder in the league.

=== DSK Shivajians ===
On 8 January 2017 Lalthathanga made his professional debut for DSK Shivajians in their opening I-League fixture of the 2016–17 season against Mumbai. He started and played the full match despite DSK Shivajians falling 1–0 at the Cooperage Ground.

=== North East United ===
==== Loan to Aizawl ====
On 29 July 2017, NorthEast United announced that they had completed a transfer for Lalthathanga, who signed a three-year contract but was immediately loaned to Aizawl for the 2017–18 season. He was a mainstay for Aizawl during the season, and would finish the season with a solitary goal.

==== Return to North East United ====
After successful season with Aizawl, Lalthathanga came back to NorthEast United for season 2018–19 season. On 1 October 2018, he made his debut against Goa. He played one more season there and made a total of 29 appearances for the club.

=== Kerala Blasters ===
On 16 September, he was signed by Kerala Blasters FC on a three-year deal. He made his debut for the Blasters against ATK Mohun Bagan on 20 November 2020, coming as a substitute in the 47th minute, where the match ended 1–0 in favour of ATK Mohun Bagan. He scored his first-ever goal in Indian Super League and for the club against Bengaluru FC on 20 January 2021, coming on as a 46th-minute substitute for Jordan Murray and the match ended 2–1 in favour for Kerala Blasters.

Puitea was included in the Kerala Blasters squad for the 2021 Durand Cup, and played all three matches for the club in the tournament. He played his first match of the 2021–22 Indian Super League on 25 November 2021, which ended in a 0–0 draw as a substitute for Ayush Adhikari in the 60th minute of the game. Puitea played a fundamental role in Kerala Blasters 3–1 victory over Mumbai City FC on 2 March 2022, and was chosen as the man of the match in the post-match conference. He formed a solid partnership with Jeakson Singh in the midfield and helped the Blasters to reach the finals, which they lost to Hyderabad on penalties.

=== ATK Mohun Bagan ===
On 29 December 2022, Puitea was announced to have agreed to join ATK Mohun Bagan for an undisclosed fee subject to the player completing a medical. On 18 March 2023, he won the 2022–23 Indian Super League trophy as ATK Mohun Bagan FC beat Bengaluru FC in the final on penalties.

== Career statistics ==
=== Club ===
As of 12 December 2024

Club	Season	League			National Cup		AFC		Other		Total	
Club	Season	Division	Apps	Goals	Apps	Goals	Apps	Goals	Apps	Goals	Apps	Goals
DSK Shivajians	2016–17	I-League	4	0	0	0	—		—		4	0
NorthEast United	2018–19	Indian Super League	20	0	1 (Note: Appearance(s) in Super Cup)	0	—		—		21	0
NorthEast United	2019–20	Indian Super League	9	0	0	0	—		—		9	0
NorthEast United	Total		29	0	1	0	0	0	0	0	30	0
Aizawl (loan)	2017–18	I-League	17	1	1	0	7 (Note: Appearance(s) in AFC Champions League) (Note: Appearance(s) in AFC Cup)	0	—		25	1
Kerala Blasters	2020–21	Indian Super League	10	1	0	0	—		—		10	1
Kerala Blasters	2021–22	Indian Super League	20	0	0	0	—		3 (Note: Appearance(s) in Durand Cup)	0	23	0
Kerala Blasters	2022–23	Indian Super League	6	0	0	0	—		—		6	0
Kerala Blasters	Total		36	1	0	0	0	0	3	0	39	1
ATK Mohun Bagan	2022–23	Indian Super League	8	0	2	0	—		—		10	0
Odisha	2023–24	Indian Super League	23	1	5	1	7	1	—		35	3
Odisha	2024–25	Indian Super League	12	1	0	0	—		—		12	1
Odisha	Total		35	2	5	1	7	1	3	0	47	4
Career total			129	4	9	1	14	1	3	0	155	6

== Honours ==
ATK Mohun Bagan

- Indian Super League: 2022–23

Kerala Blasters

- Indian Super League runner up: 2021–22.

Individual

- Mizoram Premier League Best Midfielder: 2015–16
