= Mashoor Shereef =

Indian footballer (born 1993)

Personal information
- Full name: Mashoor Shereef Thangalakath
- Date of birth: 5 January 1993 (age 33)
- Place of birth: Malappuram, Kerala, India
- Height: 1.81 m (5 ft 11 1/2 in)
- Position: Centre-back

Team information
- Current team: Malappuram FC
- Number: 3

Senior career*
Years	Team	Apps	(Gls)
2017–2020	Chennai City	31	(3)
2020–2023	NorthEast United	34	(1)
2023–2024	Punjab	3	(0)
2024–2026	Gokulam Kerala	20	(1)

International career^{‡}
2021	India	2	(0)
- * Club domestic league appearances and goals ‡ National team caps and goals as of 25 March 2021

Mashoor Shereef Thangalakath (born 5 January 1993) is an Indian professional footballer who plays as a defender.

== Club career ==
=== Chennai City ===
He made his professional debut for the Chennai City against Indian Arrows on 29 November 2017. He was brought in the 26th minute as Chennai City lost 3–0.

=== NorthEast United ===
In 2020, Mashoor joined Indian Super League club NorthEast United. He made 11 appearances in 2020–21 Indian Super League. He scored his first goal for NorthEast United on 21 December 2021 against ATK Mohun Bagan.

== International career ==
On 2 March 2021, Shereef got selected for the 35-man-squad national camp ahead of India national team's friendlies against Oman and UAE. On 29 March 2021, Shereef made his international debut for India against UAE.

== Career statistics ==
=== Club ===
As of 12 February 2025

Club	Season	League			Cup		AFC		Total	
Club	Season	Division	Apps	Goals	Apps	Goals	Apps	Goals	Apps	Goals
Chennai City	2017–18	I-League	5	1	1 (Note: Appearance(s) in Super Cup)	0	–		6	1
Chennai City	2018–19	I-League	11	0	0	0	–		11	0
Chennai City	2019–20	I-League	15	2	2 (Note: Appearance(s) in Durand Cup)	2	2 (Note: Appearance(s) in AFC Champions League) (Note: Appearance(s) in AFC Cup)	0	19	4
Chennai City	Total		31	3	3	2	2	0	36	5
NorthEast United	2020–21	Indian Super League	11	0	–		–		11	0
NorthEast United	2021–22	Indian Super League	15	1	–		–		15	1
NorthEast United	2022–23	Indian Super League	8	0	3	0	–		11	0
NorthEast United	Total		34	1	3	0	0	0	37	1
Punjab	2023–24	Indian Super League	3	0	0	0	–		3	0
Gokulam Kerala	2023–24	I-League	3	0	0	0	–		3	0
Gokulam Kerala	2024–25	I-League	12	0	0	0	–		12	0
Gokulam Kerala	2025–26	I-League	0	0	0	0	–		0	0
Career total			83	3	6	2	2	0	91	5

=== International ===
: As of 25 February 2021[6]

National team	Year	Apps	Goals
India	2021	2	0
Total		2	0
