= Girik Khosla =

Indian footballer (born 1995)

Personal information
- Date of birth: 4 January 1995 (age 31)
- Place of birth: GTB Nagar, Mumbai
- Height: 1.72 m (5 ft 7 1/2 in)
- Position: Attacking midfielder

Team information
- Current team: Calicut
- Number: 60

Senior career*
Years	Team	Apps	(Gls)
2016–2018	Minerva Punjab	19	(3)
2018–2019	NorthEast United		
2019–2020	Minerva Punjab	7	(2)
2020–2021	East Bengal		
2021–2022	Sreenidi Deccan	13	(1)
2022–2023	Real Kashmir	16	(0)
2023–2024	Delhi	9	(0)
2024–2026	Diamond Harbour	24	(7)
2026–	Calicut		
- * Club domestic league appearances and goals

Girik Khosla (born 4 January 1995) is an Indian professional footballer who plays as a midfielder for Calicut.

== Career ==
Born in Mumbai, Girik Khosla started his footballing journey with the youth setup of Mumbai FC where he captained the U14 and U17 teams before moving to the state team of Chandigarh. He caught the eyes of Minerva Punjab after guiding his state team Chandigarh to qualify for the final stages of the Santosh Trophy.

He made his senior debut for Minerva Punjab in the 2016-17 I-League season against DSK Shivajians as he came on as a substitute. He was part of the 2017-18 I-League winning team where he made 12 appearances and scored one goal.

His performance caught the eyes of Indian Super League side NorthEast United FC and he joined them for the 2018–19 Indian Super League, however he made just one appearance for the Highlanders and failed to get any gametime.

Girik Khosla returned to Minerva Punjab in the 2016–17 I-League season and got some gametimes, as he scored two goals in seven appearances.

== Career statistics ==
=== Club ===
As of 16 February 2025

Club	Season	League			Cup		AFC		Total	
Club	Season	Division	Apps	Goals	Apps	Goals	Apps	Goals	Apps	Goals
Minerva Punjab	2016–17	I-League	8	2	0	0	–		8	2
Minerva Punjab	2017–18	I-League	12	1	1 (Note: Appearance(s) in Super Cup)	0	–		13	1
Minerva Punjab	Minerva Punjab total		20	3	1	0	0	0	21	3
NorthEast United	2018–19	Indian Super League	1	0	1	0	–		2	0
Minerva Punjab	2019–20	I-League	7	2	0	0	–		7	2
East Bengal	2020–21	Indian Super League	0	0	0	0	–		0	0
Sreenidi Deccan	2021–22	I-League	13	1	0	0	–		13	1
Real Kashmir	2022–23	I-League	16	0	1	0	–		17	0
Delhi	2023–24	I-League	8	0	3 (Note: Appearance(s) in Durand Cup)	0	–		11	0
Diamond Harbour	2024–25	I-League 3	7	2	0	0	–		7	2
Diamond Harbour	2024–25	I-League 2	4	3	0	0	–		4	3
Diamond Harbour	Diamond Harbour total		11	5	0	0	0	0	11	5
Career total			76	11	6	0	0	0	82	11

== Honours ==
Minerva Punjab

- I-League: 2017–18

Delhi

- Ladakh Climate Cup: 2023
