= Didier Zokora =

Ivorian footballer (born 1980)

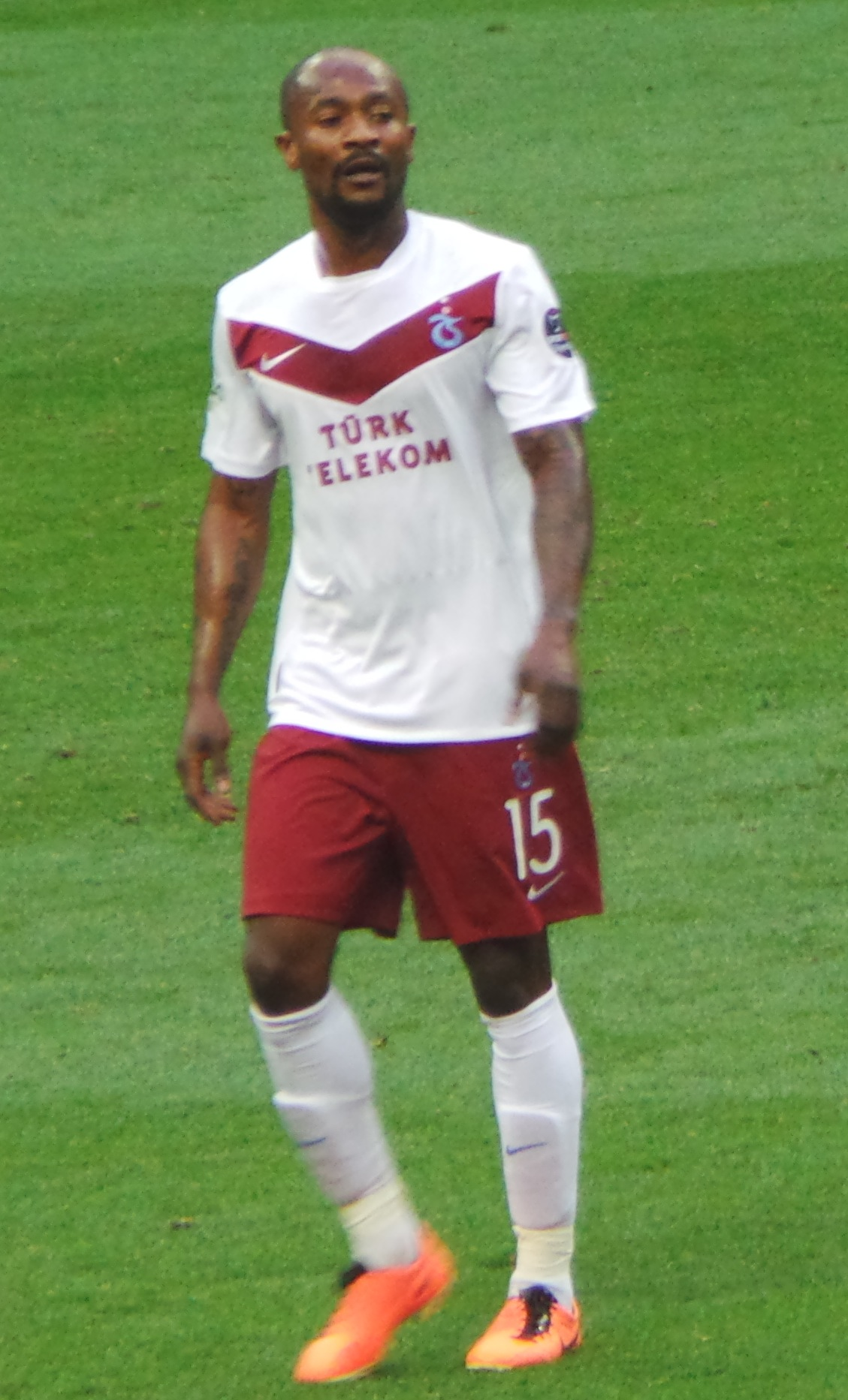
- Zokora playing for Trabzonspor in 2012

Personal information
- Full name: Déguy Alain Didier Zokora
- Date of birth: 14 December 1980 (age 45)
- Place of birth: Abidjan, Ivory Coast
- Height: 1.79 m (5 ft 10 in)
- Position: Defensive midfielder· Centre-back

Team information
- Current team: AFAD Djékanou (assistant manager)

Youth career
- 1994–1999: Académie MimoSifcom

Senior career*
Years	Team	Apps	(Gls)
1999–2000	ASEC Mimosas	1	(0)
2000–2004	Racing Genk	124	(1)
2004–2006	Saint-Étienne	66	(0)
2006–2009	Tottenham Hotspur	88	(0)
2009–2011	Sevilla	49	(0)
2011–2014	Trabzonspor	78	(0)
2014–2015	Akhisarspor	25	(0)
2015–2016	Pune City	13	(0)
2016–2017	North East United	14	(0)
2017	Semen Padang	18	(1)
Total		468	(2)

International career
2000–2014	Ivory Coast	123	(1)
Medal record
Representing Ivory Coast
Men's football
Africa Cup of Nations
Runner-up	2012 Eguatorial Guinea-Gabon
Runner-up	2006 Egypt
- * Club domestic league appearances and goals

Déguy Alain Didier Zokora (born 14 December 1980) is an Ivorian former professional footballer who played as a defensive midfielder. He represented the Ivory Coast national team for 14 years, beginning in 2000, and is currently the nation's most capped player. He now serves as an assistant manager at AFAD Djékanou.

== Club career ==
=== Early career ===
Zokora was born in Abidjan, and started his career at Académie MimoSifcom. He was offered a professional contract along with his younger brother, Armando, with Ivorian club ASEC Mimosas. Tragedy struck though as Armando drowned to death celebrating at the beach in Grand-Bassam; in memory of his brother and hero, Zokora has Armand tattooed on his right forearm.

In the summer of 2000, Zokora moved abroad to play for Belgian side K.R.C. Genk, replacing sweeper and club icon Domenico Olivieri who moved to La Louvière upon winning the 1999–2000 Belgian Cup. Zokora won the Jupiler League during the 2001–02 campaign, as manager Sef Vergoossen was named Coach of the Year and Wesley Sonck won top goal-scorer honors in the league. Playing as a centre-back, Zokora went on to feature in 126 matches for the club and was memorably part of the squad that recorded a 1–1 home draw with Real Madrid on 12 November 2002.

In the summer of 2004, he joined Saint-Étienne in the French Ligue 1.

=== Tottenham Hotspur ===
Zokora joined Tottenham Hotspur in the summer of 2006 following his performances for the Ivory Coast at the 2006 FIFA World Cup in Germany. The deal was reported by media as being worth £8.2 million. Shortly after joining the Premier League club, it was announced on 24 October 2006 that Zokora had contracted malaria after falling ill on the morning of a UEFA Cup group match against Beşiktaş in Istanbul. Zokora was in the hospital for four days and then spent a period of two weeks recovering, missing the win over Beşiktaş, two Premier League matches and a League Cup fixture as well. It was announced on 31 October that Zokora had returned to training with first-team.

Zokora won the 2007–08 League Cup with Tottenham, their first major title in nine years, as a header from Jonathan Woodgate's face secured a 2–1 extra time victory over London rivals Chelsea. He was also part of the Tottenham side which returned to Wembley Stadium the following year to play in the League Cup final, this time against Manchester United. Tottenham lost this game on penalties after the sides drew 0–0 after extra time, with Zokora playing the full 120 minutes. Zokora managed to score a penalty in the shoot-out against PSV in the UEFA Cup.

On 30 August 2008, Zokora signed a new four-year deal with Spurs that tied him to White Hart Lane until the summer of 2012. In January 2009, however, the club signed Honduran defensive midfielder Wilson Palacios from Wigan Athletic; the signing relegated Zokora to the substitutes' bench, and he played the full 90 minutes just three times after January. On 15 March, Zokora started at right back for Spurs to try and curtail the pace and trickery of Aston Villa winger Ashley Young. In the match, Zokora picked up an early booking and was substituted off after 30 minutes for defender Vedran Ćorluka.

=== Sevilla ===
During the 2009 summer transfer window, Zokora signed for Spanish La Liga side Sevilla for an undisclosed fee, including a reported €30 million release clause.

Zokora made his debut on 30 August 2009 in the first round of the 2009–10 La Liga season in a 2–0 loss to Valencia, entering as a 21st-minute substitute for his injured compatriot Romaric. In his first season in Andalusia, Zokora managed to help take Sevilla back into the UEFA Champions League after finishing La Liga in fourth position. In addition to the Liga success, he helped his side claim their fifth Copa del Rey title by defeating 2010 UEFA Europa League winners Atlético Madrid 2–0 in the final at Camp Nou.

On 29 January 2011, Zokora came on as a 77th-minute substitute for Federico Fazio and provided his only assist of the season to Álvaro Negredo, as Sevilla battled back from 2–0 down to claim a 3–3 draw with Deportivo de La Coruña.

=== Trabzonspor ===
Zokora joined Turkish side Trabzonspor on 2 June 2011 on a four-year deal. The Turkish club announced that the transfer fee was €5 million, with the player earning €1.625 million per season. He made his debut on 10 September 2011 against Manisaspor.

During a 2–0 loss on 15 April 2012 to reigning league champions Fenerbahçe, Zokora was racially abused by their midfielder Emre Belözoğlu. Zokora was quoted as saying that Emre called him a "fucking nigger!"; national papers, including Hürriyet, criticised Emre, and he was later convicted of an insult crime over the incident, receiving a two-and-a-half-month suspended prison sentence, as well as a two-match ban by the Turkish Football Federation. Zokora dished out his own retribution against the former Newcastle United midfielder when the two clubs met again on 6 May in Trabzonspor's 3–1 loss, kicking Emre "with the full force of his right boot" into his crotch with Zokora receiving a yellow card for the challenge. On 17 June 2014, Belözoğlu was sentenced to a two-and-a-half-month suspended prison sentence

On 29 April 2014, Zokora left Trabzonspor.

=== Pune City ===
In July 2015, Zokora signed for Indian Super League side FC Pune City. He debuted for the side against Delhi Dynamos FC.

=== North East United ===
Zokora signed for the Indian Super League side NorthEast United in August 2016. He made his debut coming on as a substitute against Kerala Blasters in a 1–0 win in October 2016. He had his first assist against Delhi Dynamos on 30 November 2016. He received 3 yellow cards in 14 matches; his first against Delhi Dynamos then vs Mumbai City FC and lastly against FC Pune City. He played mainly as a centre back that season and also captained his side to up to 8 games of the season out of 14.

=== Semen Padang ===
Zokora joined Indonesian club side, Semen Padang as a marquee signing on Monday, 24 April 2017. He signed a one-year deal contract. Zokora was one of the biggest transfers in Indonesian football during the 2017 season, after Michael Essien, Carlton Cole, Peter Odemwingie, Shane Smeltz and Mohamed Sissoko all joined the competition. In moving to Indonesia, Zokora became one of a growing number of high-profile players to opt for the Liga 1 late in their career. He was released in August, four months later.

== International career ==
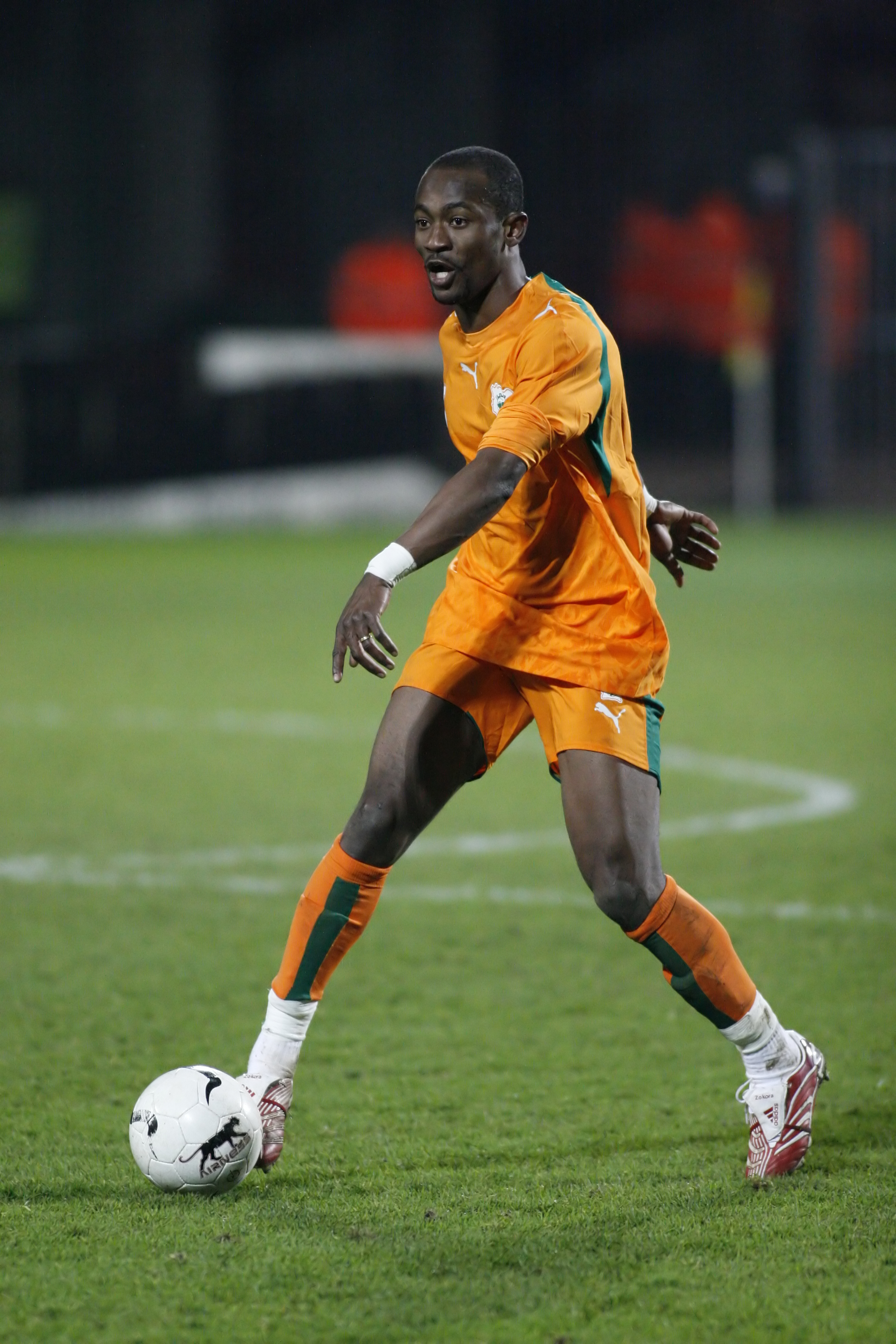
Zokora playing for the Ivory Coast in 2007

Zokora has played 123 international matches for the Ivory Coast and is their most capped player of all time. He scored his only goal at the international level in a 4–0 defeat of Botswana on 22 June 2008 that moved the Ivory Coast to the top of their group in 2010 FIFA World Cup qualifiers.

During his 12 years with the national side, Zokora helped Les Éléphants to their first two FIFA World Cup finals appearances, in 2006 and 2010. On both occasions, the Ivory Coast were drawn into the so-called "Group of Death", bowing out in third place each time. In the 2010 edition of the tournament, Zokora was forced to play in a new position, centre back, against Portugal to bolster and compact the defence against the strong attacking side; Zokora helped his side earn a 0–0 draw.

During the 2012 Africa Cup of Nations in Gabon and Equatorial Guinea, Zokora said he would retire from international football should the Ivory Coast win the title. Zokora did in fact retire from international football on 28 February 2012, following the end of the tournament, but Les Elephants went down in an 8–7 penalty shoot-out loss to Zambia in the Africa Cup of Nations final.

Despite earlier announcing his retirement, on 1 June 2014 Zokora was included by manager Sabri Lamouchi in the Ivory Coast's 23-man squad for the 2014 World Cup in Brazil.

On 8 September 2014, Zokora announced his second retirement from the national team.

== Career statistics ==
=== Club ===
Appearances and goals by club, season and competition
Club	Season	League			National cup (Note: Includes FA Cup, Copa del Rey, Turkish Cup)		League cup (Note: Includes Football League Cup)		Europe		Other		Total	
Club	Season	Division	Apps	Goals	Apps	Goals	Apps	Goals	Apps	Goals	Apps	Goals	Apps	Goals
Tottenham Hotspur	2006–07	Premier League	31	0	5	0	2	0	9 (Note: Appearances in UEFA Cup)	0	–		47	0
Tottenham Hotspur	2007–08	Premier League	28	0	1	0	4	0	10	0	–		43	0
Tottenham Hotspur	2008–09	Premier League	29	0	2	0	6	0	7	0	–		44	0
Tottenham Hotspur	Total		88	0	8	0	12	0	26	0	–		134	0
Sevilla	2009–10	La Liga	26	0	3	0	–		8 (Note: Appearances in UEFA Champions League)	0	–		37	0
Sevilla	2010–11	La Liga	23	0	8	0	–		9 (Note: Two appearances in UEFA Champions League, seven appearances in UEFA Europa League)	0	2 (Note: Appearances in Supercopa de España)	0	42	0
Sevilla	Total		49	0	11	0	–		17	0	2	0	79	0
Trabzonspor	2011–12	Süper Lig	27	0	1	0	–		9 (Note: Eight appearances in UEFA Champions League, one appearance in UEFA Europa League)	0	–		37	0
Trabzonspor	2012–13	Süper Lig	27	0	6	0	–		2 (Note: Appearances in UEFA Europa League)	0	–		35	0
Trabzonspor	2013–14	Süper Lig	24	0	0	0	–		9	0	–		33	0
Trabzonspor	Total		78	0	7	0	–		20	0	–		105	0
Akhisarspor	2014–15	Süper Lig	25	0	5	0	–		–		–		30	0
Pune City	2015	Indian Super League	13	0	–		–		–		–		13	0
NorthEast United	2016	Indian Super League	14	0	–		–		–		–		14	0
Semen Padang	2017	Liga 1	11	0	–		–		–		–		11	0
Career total			278	0	31	0	12	0	63	0	2	0	386	0

=== International ===
No.	Date	Venue	Opponent	Score	Result	Competition
1	22 June 2008	Abidjan, Ivory Coast	Botswana	4–0	Won	2010 FIFA World Cup qualification

== Honours ==
ASEC Mimosas

- CAF Super Cup: 1999

Genk

- Belgian First Division A: 2001–02

Tottenham Hotspur

- Football League Cup: 2007–08; runner-up: 2008–09

Sevilla

- Copa del Rey: 2009–10

Ivory Coast

- Africa Cup of Nations runner-up: 2006, 2012

Individual

- CAF Team of the Year: 2005, 2006

== See also ==
- List of men's footballers with 100 or more international caps
