= Federico Gallego =

Uruguayan footballer (born 1990)

Personal information
- Full name: Federico Gallego Revetria
- Date of birth: 13 June 1990 (age 36)
- Place of birth: Montevideo, Uruguay
- Height: 1.77 m (5 ft 10 in)
- Position: Attacking midfielder

Youth career
- Sud América

Senior career*
Years	Team	Apps	(Gls)
2011–2016	Sud América	110	(11)
2015	→ Argentinos Juniors (loan)	24	(1)
2017	Comunicaciones	18	(0)
2017	Liverpool Montevideo	11	(0)
2018–2019	Boston River	19	(2)
2018–2019	→ NorthEast United (loan)	18	(4)
2019–2022	NorthEast United	27	(5)
2022	Sud América	2	(0)
2022-2023	Mohun Bagan	12	(0)
2023-	Sud América	1	(1)
- * Club domestic league appearances and goals as of 12:00, 10 September 23 (UTC)

Federico "Fede" Gallego Revetria (born 13 June 1990) is a former Uruguayan professional footballer who played as an attacking midfielder. He is now the assistant coach of Deportivo Maldonado.

== Career ==
=== NorthEast United ===
Gallego was loaned from Boston River to NorthEast United for the 2018–19 Indian Super League. He scored a goal on his debut for NorthEast United against Goa. Along with teammate Bartholomew Ogbeche, he formed one of the best attacking combinations for the club. Gallego won the Fans' Player of the Month award for October in an online poll conducted by the league.

On 21 September 2020, Gallego signed a contract extension, keeping him at NorthEast United until the end of the 2020–21 season. Gallego won the Hero of the Month award for January in an online poll conducted by the league. He finished the season with 4 goals and 6 assists in all competitions, becoming NorthEast United's all-time single-season top assist provider.

On 29 September 2021, NorthEast United and Gallego agreed to a one-year contract extension for the upcoming season. On November 29, Gallego was drafted in the starting XI for the first time this season against Chennaiyin FC. In this match, Gallego was involved in a clash with Chennaiyin FC’s Narayan Das. Gallego had his knee injured in the coming together and was carried out on a stretcher. He was ruled out from the season due to his knee injury. For the 2022–23 season NEUFC decided not to retain Gallego after the club wanted to create a new policy. Fans call him as the "King of the Highlands" for his successful contributions to the club.

=== Sud América ===
On 3 September 2022, Gallego joined Uruguayan Segunda División club Sud América.

== Career statistics ==
=== Club ===
As of 3 May 2023

Club	Season	League			Cup		International		Total	
Club	Season	Division	Apps	Goals	Apps	Goals	Apps	Goals	Apps	Goals
Sud America	2011-12	Uruguayan Segunda División	25	0	0	0	0	0	25	0
Sud America	2012-13	Uruguayan Segunda División	20	3	0	0	0	0	20	3
Sud America	2013-14	Uruguayan Primera División	27	2	0	0	0	0	27	2
Sud America	Total		70	5	0	0	0	0	70	5
Argentinos Juniors	2015-16	Argentine Primera División	24	1	0	0	0	0	24	1
Argentinos Juniors	Total		24	1	0	0	0	0	24	1
Sud America	2016-17	Uruguayan Primera División	26	5	0	0	0	0	26	5
Sud America	Total		26	5	0	0	0	0	26	5
Comunicaciones F.C.	2017-18	Liga Nacional de Fútbol de Guatemala	19	1	0	0	0	0	19	1
Comunicaciones F.C.	Total		19	1	0	0	0	0	19	1
Liverpool F.C. (Montevideo)	2017	Uruguayan Primera División	11	0	0	0	0	0	11	0
Liverpool F.C. (Montevideo)	Total		11	0	0	0	0	0	11	0
Boston River	2018	Uruguayan Primera División	19	2	0	0	2	0	19	2
Boston River	Total		19	2	0	0	2	0	21	2
NorthEast United	2018–19	Indian Super League	20	4	0	0	0	0	20	4
NorthEast United	2019–20	Indian Super League	10	1	0	0	0	0	10	1
NorthEast United	2020–21	Indian Super League	16	4	–		–		16	4
NorthEast United	2021–22	Indian Super League	1	0	–		–		1	0
NorthEast United	Total		47	9	0	0	0	0	47	9
Sud America	2022	Uruguayan Segunda División	2	0	0	0	0	0	2	0
Sud America	Total		2	0	0	0	0	0	2	0
ATK Mohun Bagan	2022–23	Indian Super League	12	0	3 (Note: Appearance(s) in Super Cup)	0	1 (Note: Appearance(s) in Qualifier for AFC Cup qualifying play-off)	0	16	0
ATK Mohun Bagan	Total		12	0	3	0	1	0	16	0
Career total			230	23	3	0	3	0	236	23

== Honours ==
Sud América

- Uruguayan Segunda División: 2012–13

ATK Mohun Bagan

- Indian Super League: 2022–23

Individual

- Indian Super League Fans' Player of the Month: October 2018
- Indian Super League Hero of the Month: January 2021
