= Rupert Nongrum =

Indian footballer (born 1996)

Personal information
- Full name: Rupert Lamlang Nongrum
- Date of birth: 21 August 1996 (age 30)
- Place of birth: Meghalaya, India
- Height: 1.79 m (5 ft 10 1/2 in)
- Position: Winger

Team information
- Current team: Real Kashmir
- Number: 23

Youth career
- 2010–2015: Shillong Lajong

Senior career*
Years	Team	Apps	(Gls)
2015–2017	Shillong Lajong	22	(1)
2016	→ Delhi Dynamos (loan)	5	(0)
2017–2018	ATK	15	(0)
2018–2020	NorthEast United	4	(0)
2020–2022	RoundGlass Punjab	23	(4)
2022–2023	NorthEast United	1	(0)
2023–	Real Kashmir	0	(0)

International career
2013	India U19	2	(0)
- * Club domestic league appearances and goals as of 5 November 2022

Rupert Lamlang Nongrum (born 21 August 1996) is an Indian professional footballer who plays as a winger for Real Kashmir in the I-League.

== Career ==
=== Shillong Lajong ===
Born in Malki Meghalaya, Nongrum joined Shillong Lajong as a youth player in 2010. While with Lajong, Nongrum participated in the Subroto Cup with his high school team, Myngken Christian HSS. He eventually made it up to the under-19 team where he played for the club in the I-League U19. After good performances with the under-19 side, Nongrum was promoted to the reserve side for Shillong Lajong that participated and won the Shillong Premier League. He scored a brace for Lajong in the game that clinched the title for his club against Langsning on 29 November 2014.

His performance for the club in the Shillong Premier League earned Nongrum a promotion to the first-team. He made his senior debut for the club on 14 February 2015 in the I-League against Bengaluru FC. He started the match but could not prevent Shillong Lajong losing 2–0. On 21 January 2017, Rupert scored his first goal for Shillong Lajong against Minerva Punjab FC and won the match 2–1.

==== Delhi Dynamos (loan) ====
on 29 July 2016, ISL club Delhi Dynamos announced the signing of Rupert Nongrum on loan from Shillong Lajong. Rupert played as winger under head coach Gianluca Zambrotta in Delhi Dynamos entire season.

=== ATK ===
On 23 July 2017, Nongrum has been picked up by Kolkata club ATK.

== International ==
Nongrum was called up to the India U19 side in 2013. He was in the India U19 for the 2014 AFC U-19 Championship Qualifiers and made his debut for India U19 against Uzbekistan by coming-on as 46th-minute substitute for Gurba Gagrai.

== Career statistics ==
As of 29 December 2022

Club	Season	League			Cup		AFC		Total	
Club	Season	Division	Apps	Goals	Apps	Goals	Apps	Goals	Apps	Goals
Shillong Lajong	2014–15	I-League	2	0	0	0	—		2	0
Shillong Lajong	2015–16	I-League	9	0	0	0	—		9	0
Delhi Dynamos (Loan)	2016	Indian Super League	5	0	0	0	—		5	0
Shillong Lajong	2016–17	I-League	12	1	0	0	—		12	1
ATK	2017–18	Indian Super League	13	0	0	0	—		13	0
NorthEast United	2018–19	Indian Super League	0	0	0	0	—		0	0
NorthEast United	2019–20	Indian Super League	4	0	0	0	—		4	0
Roundglass Punjab	2020–21	I-League	8	2	0	0	—		8	2
Roundglass Punjab	2021–22	I-League	15	2	0	0	—		15	2
NorthEast United	2022–23	Indian Super League	1	0	0	0	—		1	0
Career total			76	5	0	0	0	0	76	5

== Honours ==
Shillong Lajong

- Shillong Premier League: 2015
