= Reagan Singh Keisham =

Indian footballer

Reagan Singh
Personal information
- Full name: Reagan Singh Keisham
- Date of birth: 1 April 1991 (age 35)
- Place of birth: Manipur, India
- Height: 1.70 m (5 ft 7 in)
- Position: Right back

Senior career*
Years	Team	Apps	(Gls)
2012–2015	Royal Wahingdoh	19	(1)
2015	→ NorthEast United (loan)	11	(0)
2016	Salgaocar	11	(0)
2016–2020	NorthEast United	58	(0)
2017	→ Mumbai (loan)	18	(0)
2020–2022	Chennaiyin	36	(0)
2022–2023	→ Hyderabad (loan)	8	(0)
2024	Southern Sporting Union	2	(0)
2025–	NEROCA FC	1	
- * Club domestic league appearances and goals as of 19:59, 28 January 2025 (IST) ‡ National team caps and goals as of 20:01, 28 January 2025 (IST)

Reagan Singh Keisham (Meitei: Keisham Reagan Singh, born 1 April 1991) is an Indian professional footballer who plays as a defender. He currently plays for I-League 2 club NEROCA.

== Career ==
=== Royal Wahingdoh ===
Reagan Singh started his senior career at Royal Wahingdoh in 2012 and was part of their squad in the I-League 2nd Division from the same year. He also participated in the Shillong Premier League in 2012, 2013 and 2014 and won the title in 2012. He played for the side in the 2014 I-League 2nd Division which earned promotion to I-League and scored a goal in a 1–1 draw against Kalighat on 31 March 2014.

He started his first game since Royal Wahingdoh's promotion to the I-League on 28 December 2014 in the Federation Cup against Mumbai in a 2–1 win and also started in remaining three matches. He made his I-League debut on 18 January 2015 in a 2–1 win over Shillong Lajong. He scored his first ever I-League goal on 3 April 2015 in a 3–3 draw to Bengaluru FC. Breaking onto the scene with newly promoted side Royal Wahingdoh FC in the 2015 edition of the I-League, his no nonsense defending was essential in helping the team finish third in the league. This also saw him rewarded with a callup to the India for the World Cup Qualifiers.

==== NorthEast United (loan) ====
In July 2015, Reagan was drafted to play for NorthEast United in the second edition of Indian Super League. He made his debut on 6 October 2015 in a 3–1 loss to Kerala Blasters. He made eleven appearances for the Highlanders in the season.

=== Salgaocar ===
On 7 January 2016, Salgaocar confirmed that they have signed Royal Wahingdoh's star right back till the end of season. On 28 January, he made his debut against Shillong Lajong in a 1–0 loss. He made thirteen appearances for the Goan club.

=== NorthEast United ===
On 25 May 2016, Regan signed on a permanent basis for NorthEast United with a contract till the end of the season. He made his first appearance of the season in a 1–0 win over Kerala Blasters where he started the game but he made only six more appearances in the season.

==== Loan to Mumbai FC ====
In January 2017, Reagan signed for Mumbai FC on loan for 2016-17 I-League season. He made his debut on 8 January 2017 in a 1–0 win over DSK Shivajians. He started and played every minute of his team's campaign making eighteen appearances.

==== 2017–20 ====
On 23 July 2017, Reagan extended his contract with Northeast till the end of the season. He made his first appearance of 2017–18 Indian Super League in a 2–0 win over Delhi Dynamos after being benched for first two games. He made sixteen appearances in the season including 2–0 loss to Gokulam Kerala in inaugural Super Cup. He was used more as a left back rather than a right back during the season. On 21 July 2018, he extended his contract for a further season.

The following season, he started as a right back in the opening game of the season against Goa which ended in a 2–2 draw. On 13 February, he provided his first ever assist to Bartholomew Ogbeche's goal against Mumbai City in a 2–0 win. A week later, he made his 50th Appearance for the Highlanders when he started in the 1–1 draw to FC Pune City. Northeast finished fourth and managed to qualify for playoffs. The first leg of semifinal against Bengaluru FC ended in a 2–1 victory which was also Reagan's 50th ISL game. But things turned around in second leg as Bengaluru won it 3–0. He made 18 appearances in the season all of which were starts including the 2–1 loss to Chennaiyin in the quarterfinals of Super Cup.

On 29 July 2019, he extended his contract till the end of the season. He started the season in 0–0 stalemate against Bengaluru on 21 October. On 27 January 2020, he captained his side for the first time in 1–0 defeat to ATK where also received a yellow card. 4 days later, he was sent off after receiving a second yellow card in 90th minute in 1–0 loss to Mumbai City. He ended the season with 17 appearances which were all starts, just one short of his team's entire season due to red card suspension. He still has the record for most appearances for Northeast United.

=== Chennaiyin FC ===
In September 2020, Reagan signed a one-year deal with Chennaiyin FC. He made his debut in 2–1 win over Jamshedpur at 2020–21 Indian Super League on 24 November. He provided an assist to Lallianzuala Chhangte through a cross on 13 February 2021 in a 2–2 draw against Goa. He ended the season with 18 appearances. On 26 June 2021, he extended his contract till 2023. He started the next season in a 1–0 win over Hyderabad on 23 November. He made his 100th ISL appearance when he came on as a half time substitute in 5–0 loss to Goa on 9 February 2022. He ended the season with another 18 appearances but his gametime got reduced.

=== Hyderabad FC ===
On deadline day of 31 August 2022, he joined Hyderabad FC on loan. 3 days later, he made his debut at Durand Cup in a 1–0 loss to Army Red coming as a substitute at half time. He picked up an injury during the tournament and missed the starting six league games. He finally made his league debut for The Nizams on 19 November coming as substitute in a 1–0 loss to Kerala Blasters. He made only eight league appearances as Hyderabad lost to Mohun Bagan in semifinal 4–3 on penalties. He ended the season only with 13 appearances.

== Career statistics ==
=== Club ===
As of 3 February 2024

Club	Season	League			Cup		AFC		Other		Total	
Club	Season	Division	Apps	Goals	Apps	Goals	Apps	Goals	Apps	Goals	Apps	Goals
Royal Wahingdoh	2012–13	I-League 2			0	0	—					
Royal Wahingdoh	2013–14	I-League 2	2	1	—		—		1 (Note: Appearance in Shillong Premier League)	1	3	1
Royal Wahingdoh	2014–15	I-League	19	1	4 (Note: Appearance(s) in Federation Cup)	0	—				20	1
Royal Wahingdoh	Total		21	2	4	0	0	0	1	1	26	2
Salgaocar	2015–16	I-League	11	0	2	0	—		—		13	0
NorthEast United (loan)	2015	Indian Super League	11	0	0	0	—		—		11	0
NorthEast United	2016	Indian Super League	8	0	0	0	—		—		8	0
NorthEast United	2017–18	Indian Super League	15	0	1 (Note: Appearance(s) in Super Cup)	0	—		—		16	0
NorthEast United	2018–19	Indian Super League	17	0	1	0	—		—		18	0
NorthEast United	2019–20	Indian Super League	17	0	0	0	—		—		17	0
NorthEast United	Total		68	0	2	0	0	0	0	0	70	0
Mumbai (loan)	2016–17	I-League	18	0	0	0	—		—		18	0
Chennaiyin	2020–21	Indian Super League	18	0	0	0	—		—		18	0
Chennaiyin	2021–22	Indian Super League	18	0	0	0	—		—		18	0
Chennaiyin	Total		36	0	0	0	0	0	0	0	36	0
Hyderabad (loan)	2022–23	Indian Super League	8	0	4 (Note: 1 Appearance in Durand Cup and 3 in Indian Super Cup)	0	—		1 (Note: Appearance(s) in play-offs for AFC Cup)	0	13	0
Career total			162	2	12	0	0	0	2	1	176	3
