= Redeem Tlang =

Indian footballer

Personal information
- Date of birth: 22 February 1992 (age 34)
- Place of birth: Shillong, Meghalaya, India
- Height: 1.57 m (5 ft 2 in)
- Position: Winger

Team information
- Current team: NorthEast United
- Number: 22

Youth career
- 2009–2013: Shillong Lajong

Senior career*
Years	Team	Apps	(Gls)
2013–2018	Shillong Lajong	46	(3)
2014	→ NorthEast United (loan)	1	(0)
2018–2020	NorthEast United	35	(4)
2020–2023	Goa	29	(4)
2022	→ Odisha (loan)	8	(1)
2023–	NorthEast United	17	(0)
- * Club domestic league appearances and goals as of 12:33, 23 February 2022 (UTC)

Redeem Tlang (born 22 February 1992) is an Indian professional footballer who plays as a winger for Indian Super League club NorthEast United.

== Career ==
=== Shillong Lajong ===
A product of the Shillong Lajong youth academy, forward Tlang had risen to prominence during 2013 Shillong First Division League, the second tier in Shillong’s football league structure, where he had scored goals for fun for his club, compelling coach Singto to bring him into the senior side. He made his professional debut for Shillong Lajong in the I-League on 28 October 2013 against Churchill Brothers at the Nehru Stadium; in which he came on as a substitute for Seikhohau Tuboi in the 78th minute; as Shillong Lajong drew the match 2-2. He scored his first senior team goal for Lajong in the 4-0 thrashing of Salgaocar in the 2014 Federation Cup.

Tlang would spend a total of 9 years at the club including youth years.

=== NorthEast United ===
Tlang was loaned to NorthEast United from Shillong Lajong for the Inaugural Indian Super League season. He would only make one appearance, coming on as a substitute in a 3-0 win against Chennaiyin.

Tlang would then join NorthEast on a permanent basis starting 2018–19 Indian Super League. He scored his first goal in the Indian Super league against Bengaluru in a 2-1 win. He was a regular during the season, making 19 appearances on the wing.

He scored his first goal of the 2019–20 against newly formed Odisha in a 2-1 win for his team. His second goal of the season came against Goa from the edge of the box in what proved to be a 2-2 stalemate on the 1st of November 2019.

== Career statistics ==
=== Club ===
As of 18 April 2023

Club	Season	League			Cup		Continental		Total	
Club	Season	Division	Apps	Goals	Apps	Goals	Apps	Goals	Apps	Goals
Shillong Lajong	2013–14	I-League	9	0	3 (Note: Appearance(s) in Federation Cup)	1	–		12	1
Shillong Lajong	2014–15	I-League	1	0	4	0	–		5	0
Shillong Lajong	2015–16	I-League	5	0	0	0	–		5	0
Shillong Lajong	2016–17	I-League	16	1	3	1	–		19	2
Shillong Lajong	2017–18	I-League	15	2	0	0	–		15	2
Shillong Lajong	Total		46	3	10	2	0	0	56	5
NorthEast United (loan)	2014	Indian Super League	1	0	0	0	–		1	0
NorthEast United	2018–19	Indian Super League	19	1	0	0	–		19	1
NorthEast United	2019–20	Indian Super League	16	3	0	0	–		16	3
NorthEast United	Total		35	4	0	0	0	0	35	4
Goa	2020–21	Indian Super League	10	1	0	0	3 (Note: Appearance(s) in AFC Champions League)	0	13	1
Goa	2021–22	Indian Super League	1	0	5 (Note: Appearance(s) in Durand Cup)	1	–		6	1
Goa	2022–23	Indian Super League	18	3	3 (Note: Appearance(s) in Super Cup)	0	–		21	3
Goa	Total		29	4	8	1	3	0	40	5
Odisha (loan)	2021–22	Indian Super League	8	1	0	0	–		8	1
NorthEast United	2023–24	Indian Super League	0	0	0	0	–		0	0
Career total			119	12	18	3	3	0	140	15

== Honours ==
Shillong Lajong

- Meghalaya Invitation Cup: 2016

Goa

- Durand Cup: 2021

NorthEast United

- Durand Cup: 2024, 2025
