= Maximiliano Barreiro =

Argentine forward

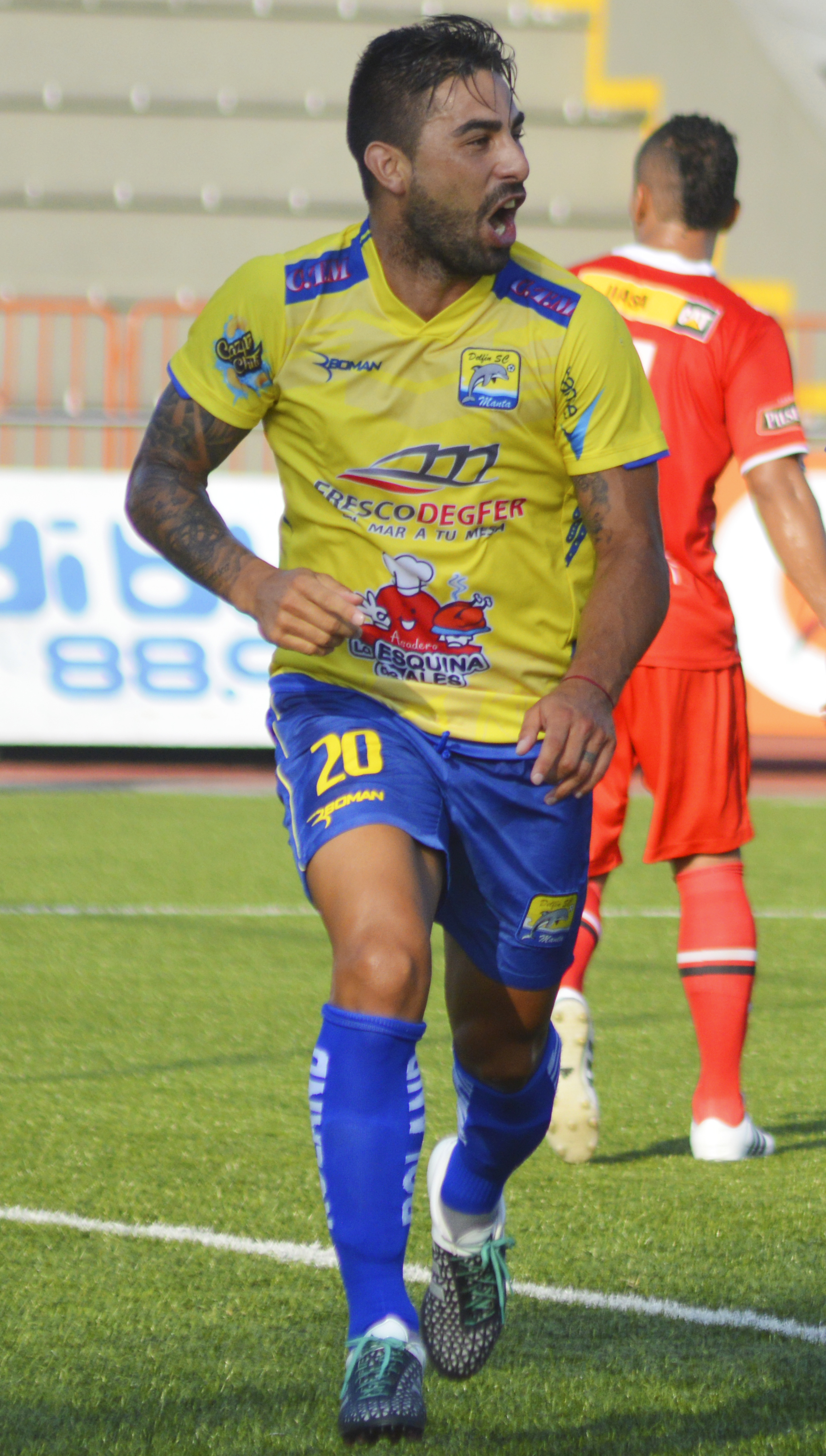

Personal information
- Full name: Maximiliano Fabián Barreiro
- Date of birth: 16 March 1985 (age 41)
- Place of birth: Mendoza, Argentina
- Height: 1.74 m (5 ft 9 in)
- Position: Forward

Youth career
- Godoy Cruz
- Talleres
- –2006: Independiente

Senior career*
Years	Team	Apps	(Gls)
2006–2008	Real Arroyo Seco		
2008–2010	Deportivo Merlo	39	(13)
2010–2011	San Martín	26	(2)
2011–2012	Deportivo Merlo	33	(11)
2012–2013	Instituto de Córdoba	20	(1)
2013	Atlético Tucumán	12	(1)
2014	Mushuc Runa	38	(13)
2015	Defensor Sporting	10	(0)
2015	Mushuc Runa	19	(5)
2016	Delfín	44	(26)
2017	Necaxa	16	(2)
2017–2018	Independiente DV	36	(12)
2018	Atlético Huila	8	(1)
2019	Aucas	18	(5)
2019	NorthEast United FC	7	(1)
2020	LDU Portoviejo	4	(2)
2020	Aucas	16	(5)
2021	Cusco FC	9	(0)
2021	Academia Cantolao	5	(1)
- * Club domestic league appearances and goals as of 21:40, 6 November 2019 (IST)

Maximilian Barreiro (Mendoza, Argentina, 16 March 1985) is an Argentine forward.
