= Gustavo Lazzaretti =

Brazilian footballer (born 1984)

Personal information
- Full name: Gustavo Lazzaretti de Araújo
- Date of birth: 9 March 1984 (age 42)
- Place of birth: Curitiba, Brazil
- Height: 1.86 m (6 ft 1 in)
- Position: Centre back

Youth career
- 1999–2003: J. Malucelli

Senior career*
| Years | Team | Apps | (Gls) |
| 2002–2003 | J. Malucelli | | |
| 2003 | Chelsea | 0 | (0) |
| 2004–2006 | Botafogo | 33 | (1) |
| 2005 | → Udinese (loan) | 1 | (0) |
| 2005–2006 | → Treviso (loan) | 26 | (1) |
| 2006–2012 | Atlético-PR | 41 | (1) |
| 2009–2010 | → Vitória Guimarães (loan) | 26 | (1) |
| 2010 | → Sport (loan) | 0 | (0) |
| 2010–2011 | → Al-Sharjah (loan) | 16 | (1) |
| 2012–2014 | Ponte Preta | 6 | (0) |
| 2015 | J. Malucelli | 9 | (0) |
| 2015 | Portuguesa | 0 | (0) |
| 2016 | Água Santa | 9 | (0) |
| 2016–2017 | NorthEast United FC | 11 | (0) |
| 2017 | Brusque | 0 | (0) |
| Total | | 178 | (5) |
- * Club domestic league appearances and goals

Gustavo Lazzaretti de Araújo, known as Gustavo (born 9 March 1984 in Curitiba), is a Brazilian retired footballer who played as a central defender. He also holds an Italian passport.
