= Ponif Vaz =

Indian footballer (born 1992)

Personal information
- Date of birth: 4 October 1992 (age 34)
- Place of birth: Fatorda, Goa, India
- Height: 1.82 m (5 ft 11 1/2 in)
- Position: Right back

Team information
- Current team: Churchill Brothers
- Number: 5

Youth career
- Salcete FC
- 2008—2012: Sesa

Senior career*
| Years | Team | Apps | (Gls) |
| 2012–2015 | Sesa | | |
| 2015–2016 | Sporting Goa | | |
| 2016–2019 | Fateh Hyderabad | 19 | (0) |
| 2019–2020 | Churchill Brothers | 13 | (1) |
| 2020–2021 | NorthEast United | | |
| 2022 | Real Kashmir | 10 | (0) |
| 2022– | Churchill Brothers | 24 | (0) |
- * Club domestic league appearances and goals as of 15 March 2024

Ponif Vaz (born 4 October 1992) is an Indian professional footballer who plays as a defender.

== Career ==
Ponif joined Sesa Football Academy at 16 and has got years of experience playing in the Goa Professional League. The highlight of his career was winning the gold medal at the 2014 Lusophony Games with the Goa-India team. Ponif started his youth career with Salcete FC and has been part of the Goa football team for Santosh Trophy for the years. In 2015 after sesa withdraw their first team vaz jointed sporting goa.

He made his professional debut for Churchill Brothers at Fatorda Stadium against Punjab F.C. on 1 December 2019. Churchill Brothers won by 3–0.

== Honours ==
- Lusofonia Games gold medal: 2014
