= Mislav Komorski =

Croatian footballer

Personal information
- Date of birth: 17 April 1992 (age 34)
- Place of birth: Zagreb, Croatia
- Height: 1.90 m (6 ft 3 in)
- Position: Centre back

Team information
- Current team: Kustošija
- Number: 6

Youth career
- 2003–2010: Dinamo Zagreb

Senior career*
Years	Team	Apps	(Gls)
2010	Dinamo Zagreb	0	(0)
2010–2013	Lokomotiva	48	(2)
2013–2015	Hrvatski Dragovoljac	30	(2)
2015–2018	Inter Zaprešić	77	(0)
2018–2020	NorthEast United	23	(0)
2020—2021	Sesvete	18	(0)
2022	Orijent	4	(0)
2022-	Kustošija	5	(0)

International career^{‡}
2007	Croatia U15	6	(0)
2008	Croatia U16	5	(1)
2008–2009	Croatia U17	11	(2)
2010	Croatia U18	6	(0)
2010–2011	Croatia U19	12	(0)
2011–2012	Croatia U20	3	(0)
- * Club domestic league appearances and goals as of 25 September 2022 ‡ National team caps and goals as of 30 August 2015

Mislav Komorski (born 17 April 1992) is a Croatian professional footballer who plays for Croatian Club Kustošija.

== Club career ==
A product of Dinamo Zagreb Academy, Komorski signed a professional contract with the club in June 2010, before having it rescinded a month later, to sign an equally long contract with NK Lokomotiva until 2017, Dinamo's farm team as means of getting around the "6 loaned players maximum" rule. He has since become a fixture in the Lokomotiva first team.

Komorski has since 21 February 2013, been on a trial with the Danish Superliga side SønderjyskE.

After a two-season stint at NK Hrvatski Dragovoljac, Komorski signed in the summer of 2015 for NK Inter Zaprešić.

Komorski signed for Indian club Northeast United for the 2018–19 season. He played an important role in team's defense. He got injured during the team's match against Bengaluru and was unable to play the remainder of the season.

== International career ==
Internationally, Komorski represented Croatia at all youth levels and was a regular member of the Croatia under-19 team.
