= José David Leudo =

Colombian footballer (born 1993)

Personal information
- Full name: José David Leudo Romaña
- Date of birth: 9 November 1993 (age 33)
- Place of birth: Apartadó, Colombia
- Height: 1.82 m (6 ft 0 in)
- Position: Midfielder

Team information
- Current team: Inter de Palmira
- Number: 16

Senior career*
Years	Team	Apps	(Gls)
2009	Boyacá Chicó	1	(0)
2010–2011	Fénix	0	(0)
2012–2014	Estudiantes	0	(0)
2014–2015	Colón	0	(0)
2015	→ Once Caldas (loan)	12	(0)
2015–2017	Deportivo Pasto	42	(0)
2017	Veracruz	0	(0)
2017–2018	Atlético Huila	23	(0)
2018–2020	NorthEast United	33	(1)
2021–2023	Patriotas Boyacá	51	(0)
2022–2023	→ Rosario Central (loan)	0	(0)
2023	Águilas Doradas	11	(0)
2023	Llaneros	22	(0)
2024–	Inter de Palmira	28	(0)

International career
2013	Colombia U20	13	(0)
2013	Colombia U21	3	(0)
2016	Colombia U23	1	(0)
- * Club domestic league appearances and goals as of 19:21, 9 November 2024 (UTC)

José David Leudo Romaña (born 9 November 1993) is a Colombian footballer who plays as a midfielder for Colombian Categoría Primera B side Inter de Palmira.

== Club career ==
=== Early career ===
Leudo made his professional debut with Boyacá Chicó on 14 March 2009, in a 1–1 away draw against América de Cali.

In 2010, Leudo joined Uruguayan Primera División side CA Fénix, but failed to make an appearance for the club; the following year he joined Argentine Primera División club Estudiantes de La Plata, after an unsuccessful trial at Boca Juniors.

After another spell without playing at Estudiantes, Leudo joined Argentine Nacional B side Colón, signing an 18-month contract.

In January 2015, he joined Colombia side Once Caldas on loan.

=== Deportivo Pasto ===
In the summer of 2015, Leudo joined Deportivo Pasto.

=== Veracruz ===
On 19 January 2017, Leudo joined Liga MX club Veracruz.

=== Atlético Huila ===
In June 2017, Leudo returned to Colombia, joining Categoría Primera A club Atlético Huila.

=== NorthEast United FC ===
On 28 August 2018, Leudo moved abroad and joined Indian Super League franchise NorthEast United FC. On 1 December 2018 he was awarded as the hero of the match due to his passing accuracy.

=== Patriotas Boyacá ===
In January 2021 he joined Patriotas Boyacá for the 2021 season.

=== Rosario Central ===
On 20 June 2022, Leudo joined Rosario Central on a free transfer.

=== Águilas Doradas ===
On 19 January 2023, he returned to Colombia joining Categoría Primera A club Águilas Doradas.

=== Llaneros ===
On 5 July 2023, Leudo joined Categoría Primera B side Llaneros.
