= Shouvik Ghosh =

Indian footballer (born 1992)

Personal information
- Full name: Shouvik Debkumar Ghosh
- Date of birth: 5 November 1992 (age 34)
- Place of birth: Uttarpara, West Bengal, India
- Height: 1.81 m (5 ft 11 in)
- Position: Left back

Team information
- Current team: Rajasthan United
- Number: 3

Senior career*
Years	Team	Apps	(Gls)
2010–2013	Pailan Arrows	42	(0)
2013–2016	Mohun Bagan	21	(0)
2014	→ Delhi Dynamos (loan)	13	(0)
2016	NorthEast United	6	(1)
2017	→ Mohun Bagan (loan)	2	(0)
2017	Jamshedpur	10	(0)
2018	Mumbai City	3	(0)
2018–2019	NorthEast United	4	(0)
2020–2021	TRAU	0	(0)
2021–2022	BSS Sporting Club		
2022–2023	Peerless SC		
2023–	Rajasthan United	0	(0)

International career^{‡}
2009–2011	India U19	7	(0)
2012	India U23	5	(0)
- * Club domestic league appearances and goals as of 15:10, 28 June 2021 (UTC) ‡ National team caps and goals as of 11:01, 1 March 2016 (UTC)

Shouvik Debkumar Ghosh (Bengali: সৌভিক দেবকুমার ঘোষ; born 5 November 1992) is an Indian footballer who plays as a defender for Rajasthan United in the I-League.

== Career ==
=== Pailan Arrows ===
Ghosh joined Arrows in 2010 when it was formed as AIFF XI. After making only two appearances in his first season for Pailan Arrows, he established himself as a regular player next season playing in 16 matches in 2011–12.

On 10 October 2012, Ghosh was named the captain of the outfit.

=== Mohun Bagan ===
After spending three years with Pailan Arrows it was confirmed on 22 October 2013 that Ghosh had signed for Mohun Bagan.

He made his debut in the I-League on 23 October 2013 against Salgaocar at the Salt Lake Stadium in which he came on as a substitute for Ravinder Singh in the 46th minute as Mohun Bagan won the match 2–1.

=== Delhi Dynamos (loan) ===
Shouvik represented Delhi Dynamos FC in the 2014 Indian Super League and was a regular for them at left back.

=== NorthEast United ===
On 25 May 2016, ISL club NorthEast United FC signed Ghosh from Mohun Bagan for the third edition of Hero ISL. He netted his first goal for the club on 26 November during the extra times costing a draw against Chennaiyan FC.

=== Jamshedpur ===
On 23 July 2017, Ghosh was selected in the 8th round of the 2017–18 ISL Players Draft by Jamshedpur for the 2017–18 Indian Super League. He made his debut for the club during the first ever match on 18 November 2017 against NorthEast United. He started the match and played 80 minutes as Jamshedpur drew 0–0.

== International ==
Ghosh has played for the India U19 team during the AFC U-19 qualifying campaigns. Ghosh made his India U23 debut against Lebanon U23 on 23 June 2012 during the qualifiers for the 2013 AFC U-22 Asian Cup, playing the whole 90 minutes as India won 5–2.

== Career statistics ==
=== Club ===
Statistics accurate as of 26 March 2015

Club	Season	League			Federation Cup		Durand Cup		AFC		Total	
Club	Season	Division	Apps	Goals	Apps	Goals	Apps	Goals	Apps	Goals	Apps	Goals
Pailan Arrows	2010–11	I-League	2	0	0	0	0	0	—	—	2	0
Pailan Arrows	2011–12	I-League	16	0	0	0	0	0	—	—	16	0
Pailan Arrows	2012–13	I-League	24	0	1	0	2	0	—	—	27	0
Mohun Bagan	2013–14	I-League	18	0	4	0	0	0	—	—	22	0
Delhi Dynamos FC (loan)	2014	ISL	13	0	—	—	—	—	—	—	13	0
Mohun Bagan	2014–15	I-League	4	0	0	0	0	0	—	—	4	0
Mohun Bagan	2016–17	I-League	3	0	0	0	0	0	—	—	3	0
NorthEast United FC (loan)	2016	ISL	6	1	—	—	—	—	—	—	6	1
Career total			86	0	5	0	2	0	0	0	89	1
