= Fanai Lalrempuia =

Indian footballer (born 1996)

Personal information
- Date of birth: 11 May 1996 (age 30)
- Place of birth: Lunglei, Mizoram, India
- Height: 1.72 m (5 ft 7 1/2 in)
- Position: Central midfielder

Youth career
- Bazarveng FC
- 2010: Maomit High School
- 2011–2013: Pune

Senior career*
Years	Team	Apps	(Gls)
2013–2015	Pune	27	(2)
2015	Pune City	3	(0)
2017	→ Minerva Punjab (loan)	5	(0)
2016–2021	NorthEast United	17	(0)

International career
2013–2014	India U19	4	(0)
- * Club domestic league appearances and goals

Fanai Lalrempuia (born 11 May 1996) is an Indian former professional footballer who played as a central midfielder. He was known for his superb ball control, accurate passing and speed.

== Career ==
=== Early career ===
Born in Lunglei, Mizoram, Lalrempuia started to play football from the age of 11 for his local side Bazarveng FC. Under the coaching of Flalbiakchhunga, his head coach at Bazarveng FC, Lalrempuia started to improve as a player. Eventually he was selected to join the Maomit High School under-14 side that was to compete in the Subroto Cup in 2010. While playing in the Subroto Cup Lalrempuia was spotted by Pune F.C. Academy assistant coach Gift Raikhan who then selected Fanai to trial at the academy. After the trial Lalrempuia was selected to join the academy. During his two seasons with the academy, Lalrempuia won the I-League U19 twice in 2012 and 2013 while also scoring a total of six goals during that time.

=== Pune ===
Then at the age of only 16, Lalrempuia made his professional debut for Pune in the I-League on 20 April 2013 against Air India at the Balewadi Sports Complex. He came on in the 55th minute of the match as a substitute for Velington Rocha as Pune went on to win the match 6–0. Lalrempuia scored his first goal in the I-League on 4 April 2015 against Bharat FC in the first ever Pune derby.

=== NorthEast United ===
In 2016, Lalrenpuia has signed with Indian Super League club NorthEast United.

== International ==
On 28 September 2013, it was announced that Lalrempuia had been selected into the 23-man squad for the India U19 side during the 2014 AFC U-19 Championship qualifiers. He then made his international debut for the country at the U19 level in India's first match of qualifiers against Qatar U20 on 4 October 2013. He started the match and lasted the full 90 minutes as India lost 2–0.

== Career statistics ==
As of 20 March 2021

Club	Season	League			Cup		AFC		Total	
Club	Season	Division	Apps	Goals	Apps	Goals	Apps	Goals	Apps	Goals
Pune	2012–13	I-League	3	0	0	0	—	—	3	0
Pune	2013–14	I-League	11	0	2	0	4	0	17	0
Pune	2014–15	I-League	13	2	0	0	—	—	13	2
Pune City	2015	Indian Super League	3	0	0	0	—	—	3	0
Minerva Punjab (loan)	2016–17	I-League	5	0	0	0	—	—	5	0
NorthEast United	2016	Indian Super League	2	0	—		—		2	0
NorthEast United	2017—18	Indian Super League	3	0	1 (Note: Appearances in the Super Cup)	0	—		4	0
NorthEast United	2018–19	Indian Super League	2	0	0	0	_		3	0
NorthEast United	2019–20	Indian Super League	1	0	—		_		1	0
NorthEast United	2020–21	Indian Super League	9	0	—		_		9	0
NorthEast United	Total		17	0	1	0	—		18	0
Career total			57	2	3	0	4	0	64	2
