= 2025–26 Diamond Harbour FC season =

Diamond Harbour
2025–26 season
- CEO: Abhishek Banerjee
- Head coach: (Spain) Kibu Vicuña
- Stadium: Naihati Stadium
- Indian Football League: Champions (Promotion)
- Calcutta Football League: Super Six
- Durand Cup: Runners-up
- Oil India Gold Cup: Winners
- Sikkim Gold Cup: Semi-final
- Biggest win: 8–1 BSF FT (1 August 2025, Durand Cup)
- Biggest defeat: 6–1 NorthEast United (23 August 2025, Durand Cup)
| Home colours | Away colours | Third colours |

The 2025–26 season was the 5th season of Diamond Harbour in existence and 1st in the Indian Football League and Durand Cup.

== Personnel ==
=== Current technical staff ===
As of July 2025

| Title | Name |
|---|---|
| Owner | (India) Abhishek Banerjee |
| Head coach | (Spain) Kibu Vicuña |
| Assistant coach | (India) Dipankur Sharma |
| Assistant coach | (India) Nitesh Singh |
| Assistant coach | (India) Kartick Biswas |
| Assistant coach | (India) Chiranjit Malakar |
| Assistant coach | (India) Sandeep Nandy |

== Players ==
=== First team squad ===
As of 1 October 2025

Note: Flags indicate national team as defined under FIFA eligibility rules; some limited exceptions apply. Players may hold more than one non-FIFA nationality.

| No. | Pos. | Nation | Player |
|---|---|---|---|
| 1 | GK | IND | Arit Hazra |
| 4 | DF | ESP | Mikel Kortazar |
| 5 | MF | IND | Lalliansanga Renthlei |
| 8 | MF | IND | Wahengbam Angousana |
| 9 | FW | BRA | Clayton |
| 12 | DF | IND | Nayan Tudu |
| 13 | FW | IND | Shaiborlang Kharpan |
| 14 | MF | IND | Paul Ramfangzauva |
| 16 | DF | IND | Rabilal Mandi |
| 17 | DF | IND | Wungngayam Muirang |
| 18 | MF | IND | Supriya Pandit |
| 19 | DF | IND | Sairuat Kima |
| 21 | GK | IND | Susnata Malik Aakash |
| 22 | FW | IND | Jobby Justin (captain) |
| 23 | DF | IND | Melroy Assisi |
| 24 | FW | IND | Thanglalsoun Gangte |
| 25 | DF | IND | Bikramjit Singh |
| 26 | MF | IND | Suprodip Hazra |

| No. | Pos. | Nation | Player |
|---|---|---|---|
| 28 | MF | IND | Akash Hemram |
| 29 | FW | IND | Naro Hari Shrestha |
| 30 | MF | IND | Malsawmzuala |
| 31 | GK | IND | Subrata Santra |
| 32 | GK | IND | Mirshad Michu |
| 33 | DF | IND | Ajith Kumar |
| 37 | MF | IND | Samuel Lalmuanpuia |
| 60 | MF | IND | Girik Khosla |
| 67 | FW | IND | Tharpuia |
| 91 | FW | IND | Halicharan Narzary (on loan from Bengaluru) |
| 95 | DF | IND | Naresh Singh Yendrembam |
| 99 | FW | SLO | Luka Majcen |
| — | DF | IND | Aqib Nawab |
| — | MF | IND | Supratim Das (on loan from Mumbai City) |
| — | GK | IND | Mohammed Arbaz (on loan from Kerala Blasters) |
| — | MF | IND | Bryce Miranda |
| — | FW | NGR | Bright Enobakhare |
| — | MF | NGR | Sunday Afolabi |

== Competitions ==
=== Overall record ===
| Competition | First match | Last match | Starting round | Final position | Record | | | | | | | |
| Competition | First match | Last match | Starting round | Final position | Pld | W | D | L | GF | GA | GD | Win % |
|---|---|---|---|---|---|---|---|---|---|---|---|---|
| I-League | 27 February 2026 | 23 May 2026 | First stage | Champions | 14 | 9 | 2 | 3 | 31 | 20 | +11 | 64.29 |
| Durand Cup | 23 July 2025 | 23 August 2025 | Group stage | Runners-up | 6 | 4 | 0 | 2 | 16 | 14 | +2 | 66.67 |
| CFL | 27 June 2025 | 22 September 2025 | Group stage | Super Six | 15 | 8 | 4 | 3 | 21 | 10 | +11 | 53.33 |
| Oil India Gold Cup | 26 October 2025 | 30 October 2025 | Quarter-final | Winners | 3 | 3 | 0 | 0 | 7 | 1 | +6 | 100.00 |
| Sikkim Gold Cup | 18 November 2025 | 27 November 20275 | Pre-Quarter-final | Semi-final | 3 | 2 | 0 | 1 | 6 | 4 | +2 | 66.67 |
| Total | | | | | 41 | 26 | 6 | 9 | 81 | 49 | +32 | 63.41 |

Source: Soccerway

=== Calcutta Football League ===
==== Group stage (Group B) ====
| Pos | Team | Pld | W | D | L | GF | GA | GD | Pts | Qualification | UTD | DIH | UKS | BHA | PRL | RNB | SRB | KID | WAR | ARY | MDS | CPC | SOU |
|---|---|---|---|---|---|---|---|---|---|---|---|---|---|---|---|---|---|---|---|---|---|---|---|
| 1 | United SC | 12 | 8 | 3 | 1 | 18 | 6 | +12 | 27 | Super Six round | | | 0–1 | | 1–1 | 2–1 | | | 2–0 | 2–1 | 3–0 | 2–1 | |
| 2 | Diamond Harbour | 12 | 7 | 4 | 1 | 16 | 5 | +11 | 25 | Super Six round | 0–2 | | 0–0 | | | | 0–0 | 2–0 | 1–0 | 1–0 | 1–0 | 4–0 | |
| 3 | United Kolkata SC | 12 | 7 | 3 | 2 | 21 | 7 | +14 | 24 | Super Six round | | | | 1–2 | | 1–0 | | | | 3–0 | 1–1 | | |
| 4 | Bhawanipore | 12 | 6 | 4 | 2 | 21 | 7 | +14 | 22 | | 0–0 | 0–1 | | | | | | 5–0 | 3–0 | | | | |
| 5 | Peerless | 12 | 5 | 6 | 1 | 14 | 6 | +8 | 21 | | | 1–1 | 1–0 | 0–0 | | | 4–0 | | | | | | 2–1 |

Source: The Away End
Legend: Blue = home team win; Yellow = draw; Red = away team win.
Rules for classification: 1) points; 2) head-to-head points; 3) head-to-head goal difference; 4) goal difference; 5) number of goals scored; 6) drawing of lots

==== Super Six ====
| Pos | Team | Pld | W | D | L | GF | GA | GD | Pts | Qualification | EAB^{(EAB)} | UTD^{(UTD)} | SUS | DIH^{(DIH)} | UKS | CCU |
|---|---|---|---|---|---|---|---|---|---|---|---|---|---|---|---|---|
| 2 | United SC^{(IL2)} | 3 | 1 | 1 | 1 | 5 | 4 | +1 | 4 | | 1–2 | | 2–2 | | | |
| 3 | Suruchi Sangha (Q) | 3 | 1 | 1 | 1 | 5 | 6 | −1 | 4 | Eligible for I-League 3 (Note: If the top teams are already playing in national leagues, then the next highest ranked team(s) would be eligible for I-League 3.) | | | | 0–4 | | |
| 4 | Diamond Harbour^{(IL)} | 3 | 1 | 0 | 2 | 5 | 5 | 0 | 3 | | | | | | | 0–2 |
| 5 | United Kolkata (Q) | 3 | 1 | 0 | 2 | 5 | 6 | −1 | 3 | Eligible for I-League 3 (Note: If the top teams are already playing in national leagues, then the next highest ranked team(s) would be eligible for I-League 3.) | | | 0–3 | | | |
| 6 | Calcutta Customs | 3 | 1 | 0 | 2 | 2 | 7 | −5 | 3 | | | 0–2 | | | 0–5 | |

Source: The Away End
Legend: Blue = home team win; Yellow = draw; Red = away team win.
Rules for classification: 1) points; 2) head-to-head points; 3) head-to-head goal difference; 4) goal difference; 5) number of goals scored; 6) drawing of lots
(Q) Qualified for the phase indicated

=== Durand Cup ===
Group stage (Group B)

| Pos | Team | Pld | W | D | L | GF | GA | GD | Pts | Qualification | MBG | DIH | MSC | BSF |
|---|---|---|---|---|---|---|---|---|---|---|---|---|---|---|
| 1 | Mohun Bagan (H) | 3 | 3 | 0 | 0 | 12 | 2 | +10 | 9 | knockout stage | | 5–1 | 3–1 | 4–0 |
| 2 | Diamond Harbour | 3 | 2 | 0 | 1 | 11 | 7 | +4 | 6 | knockout stage | | | 2–1 | 8–1 |
| 3 | Mohammedan (H) | 3 | 1 | 0 | 2 | 5 | 5 | 0 | 3 | | | | | 3–0 |
| 4 | Border Security Force | 3 | 0 | 0 | 3 | 1 | 15 | −14 | 0 | | | | | |

Source: DFTS
Legend: Blue = home team win; Yellow = draw; Red = away team win.
Rules for classification: Group stage tiebreakers
(H) Hosts

==== Matches ====
Win Draw Loss Void

| 28 July 2025 Group stage | Mohammedan | 1–2 | Diamond Harbour | Kolkata |
| 19:00 IST | T. Adison 36' | Report | S. Kima 51'; Majcen 90+10' | Stadium: Salt Lake Stadium; Attendance: 1,925; Referee: Lakshay; Man of the Match: Sairuat Kima (Diamond Harbour) |

| 1 August 2025 Group stage | Diamond Harbour | 8–1 | BSF FT | Kolkata |
| 19:00 IST | Clayton 2', 35', 72', 90+3'; Majcen 7', 37'; Ramfangzauva 53'; J. Justin 67' | Report | Kishori 90' | Stadium: Kishore Bharati Krirangan; Attendance: 182; Referee: Shantan Agrawal; Man of the Match: Clayton (Diamond Harbour) |

| 9 August 2025 Group stage | Diamond Harbour | 1–5 | Mohun Bagan | Kolkata |
| 19:00 IST | Majcen 24'; Melroy Assisi (yellow card) 40'; Paul Ramfangzauva (yellow card) 45'; Naresh Singh (red card) 50'; Lalliansanga Renthlei (yellow card) 90+2' | Report | Thapa 19'; Maclaren 35'; Apuia (yellow card) 38'; Liston 51' (pen.); Sahal 64'; Cummings 80' | Stadium: Salt Lake Stadium; Attendance: 8,592; Referee: Ashwin; Man of the Match: Liston Colaco (Mohun Bagan) |

==== Knockout stage ====
Quarter-finals
16 Aug – Shillong
Shillong Lajong | 2
Indian Navy | 1
16 Aug – Kokrajhar
Bodoland | 0
NorthEast United | 4
17 Aug – Jamshedpur
Jamshedpur | 0
Diamond Harbour | 2
17 Aug – Kolkata
East Bengal | 2
Mohun Bagan | 1

Semi-finals
19 Aug – Shillong
Shillong Lajong | 0
NorthEast United | 1
20 Aug – Kolkata
Diamond Harbour | 2
East Bengal | 1

Final
23 Aug – Kolkata
NorthEast United | 6
Diamond Harbour | 1

| 17 August 2025 Quarter-final | Jamshedpur | 0–2 | Diamond Harbour | Jamshedpur |
| 16:00 IST | | Report | Sairuat Kima 3', 41' | Stadium: JRD Tata Sports Complex; Attendance: 11,472; Referee: Lakshay; Man of the Match: Sairuat Kima (Diamond Harbour) |

| 20 August 2025 Semi-final | Diamond Harbour | 2–1 | East Bengal | Kolkata |
| 19:00 IST | Sairuat Kima (yellow card) 23'; Melroy Assisi (yellow card) 66'; Mikel Kortazar 66'; Jobby 83' | Report | Lalchungnunga (yellow card) 33'; Anwar 67' | Stadium: Salt Lake Stadium; Attendance: 18,960; Referee: Harish Kundu; Man of the Match: Mirshad Michu (Diamond Harbour) |

| 23 August 2025 Final | NorthEast United | 6–1 | Diamond Harbour | Kolkata |
| 17:30 IST | Asheer 30'; Parthib 45+1'; Tondonba 50'; Samperio 81'; Andy 85'; Ajaraie 90+3' (pen.) | Report | Majcen 68' | Stadium: Salt Lake Stadium; Attendance: 16,920; Referee: Venkatesh Ramachadran; Man of the Match: Alaaeddine Ajaraie (NorthEast United) |

=== I-League ===
League stage

| Pos | Team | Pld | W | D | L | GF | GA | GD | Pts | Qualification |
|---|---|---|---|---|---|---|---|---|---|---|
| 1 | Diamond Harbour | 9 | 7 | 1 | 1 | 22 | 12 | +10 | 22 | Promotion round |
| 2 | Shillong Lajong | 9 | 5 | 2 | 2 | 16 | 9 | +7 | 17 (Note: Tied on head-to-head result and head-to-head goal difference. Total goal difference: Shillong Lajong +7, Rajasthan United +3.) | Promotion round |
| 3 | Rajasthan United | 9 | 5 | 2 | 2 | 13 | 10 | +3 | 17 | Promotion round |
| 4 | Sreenidi Deccan | 9 | 4 | 3 | 2 | 10 | 8 | +2 | 15 | Promotion round |
| 5 | Chanmari | 9 | 3 | 2 | 4 | 14 | 15 | −1 | 11 | Promotion round |

Source: IFL
Rules for classification: 1) Points; 2) Head-to-head points; 3) Head-to-head goal difference; 4) Total goal difference; 5) Total number of goals scored; 6) drawing of lots
(Note: Head-to-head record is used only after all the matches between the teams in question have been played)
Notes:

Promotion Round

| Pos | Team | Pld | W | D | L | GF | GA | GD | Pts | Promotion |
|---|---|---|---|---|---|---|---|---|---|---|
| 1 | Diamond Harbour (C, P) | 14 | 9 | 2 | 3 | 31 | 20 | +11 | 29 | Promotion to ISL |
| 2 | Shillong Lajong | 14 | 8 | 4 | 2 | 28 | 12 | +16 | 28 | |
| 3 | Sreenidi Deccan | 14 | 7 | 5 | 2 | 18 | 13 | +5 | 26 | |
| 4 | Rajasthan United | 14 | 5 | 3 | 6 | 20 | 24 | −4 | 18 | |
| 5 | Chanmari | 14 | 4 | 3 | 7 | 19 | 25 | −6 | 15 | |

Source: IFL
Rules for classification: 1) Points; 2) Head-to-head points; 3) Head-to-head goal difference; 4) Total goal difference; 5) Total number of goals scored; 6) drawing of lots
(Note: Head-to-head record is used only after all the matches between the teams in question have been played)
(C) Champions; (P) Promoted

=== Oil India Gold Cup ===
Diamond Harbour also participated in the 8th Oil India Challenge Gold Cup held at Duliajan, Assam and fielded mostly their reserve squad for the tournament. They started the tournament directly from the quarter-final.

==== Bracket ====
Quarter-finals
24 Oct
Shillong Lajong | 3
Assam Police | 1
25 Oct
East Bengal II | 0
Oil India | 1
23 Oct
NorthEast United II | 0
United Chirang Duar | 4
26 Oct
Diamond Harbour | 1
TRAU | 0

Semi-finals
27 Oct
Shillong Lajong | 1
Oil India | 0
28 Oct
United Chirang Duar | 1
Diamond Harbour | 4

Final
30 Oct
Shillong Lajong | 0
Diamond Harbour | 2

| 26 October 2025 Quarter-final | Diamond Harbour | 1–0 | TRAU | Duliajan |
| 17:30 IST | Bright 57' (pen.) | Report | | Stadium: Nehru Maidan; Man of the Match: Mikel Kortazar (Diamond Harbour) |

| 28 October 2025 Semi-final | United Chirang Duar | 1—4 | Diamond Harbour | Duliajan |
| 17:30 IST | Biliphang 25' | Report | Bright 17'; Justin 71', 88'; Lalliansanga 77' | Stadium: Nehru Maidan; Referee: Baju Tussoh; Man of the Match: Lalliansanga Renthlei (Diamond Harbour) |

| 30 October 2025 Final | Shillong Lajong | 0–2 | Diamond Harbour | Duliajan |
| 17:30 IST | | Report | Bright 8'; Justin 17' | Stadium: Nehru Maidan; Referee: Abdul Mazid Choudhury; Man of the Match: Bright Enobakhare (Diamond Harbour) |

=== Sikkim Gold Cup ===
Diamond Harbour also participated in the 41st Sikkim Gold Cup held at Paljor Stadium, Gangtok and fielded mostly their reserve squad for the tournament. Diamond Harbour started the tournament directly from the pre-quarter-final.

==== Bracket ====
Pre-Qualifying
(India) Sikkim Brotherhood | 1
(India) Sikkim Himalayan | 3
(Tibet) Tibetan NFA | 0
(India) Sikkim Dragons | 4
(India) GTA XI | 1
(India) Sikkim Police | 3
(India) Services | 3
(India) Sikkim Aakraman | 0

Pre-Quarter
(India) Rajasthan United | 3
(India) Sikkim Himalayan | 0
(India) Sikkim Dragons | 2
(India) NEROCA | 0
(India) Diamond Harbour | 3
(India) Sikkim Police | 1
(India) Services | 1
(India) Sudeva Delhi | 0

Quarterfinals
(Nepal) Church Boys United | 1
(India) Rajasthan United | 3
(India) Sikkim Dragons | 2
(India) NorthEast United (R) | 1
(India) Inter Kashi | 1
(India) Diamond Harbour | 3
(India) Services | 1
(India) East Bengal (R) | 0

Semifinals
(India) Rajasthan United | 3
(India) Sikkim Dragons | 2
(India) Diamond Harbour | 0
(India) Services | 2

Final
(India) Rajasthan United | 1
(India) Services | 0

| 18 November 2025 Pre-Quarter-final | Diamond Harbour | 3–1 | Sikkim Police | Gangtok |
| 14:00 IST | | | | Stadium: Paljor Stadium |

| 22 November 2025 Quarter-final | Inter Kashi (India) | 1–3 | Diamond Harbour | Gangtok |
| 14:00 IST | | | | Stadium: Paljor Stadium |

| 27 November 2025 Semi-final | Diamond Harbour | 0–2 | Services | Gangtok |
| 16:30 IST | | | | Stadium: Paljor Stadium |
