= 2025–26 NorthEast United FC season =

2025–26 season of NorthEast United FC

NorthEast United
2025–26 season
- CEO: Mandar Tamhane
- Head Coach: Juan Pedro Benali
- Stadium: Indira Gandhi Athletic Stadium, Guwahati
- Indian Super League: 9th
- Super Cup: Group stage
- Durand Cup: Champions
- Biggest win: 6–1 DHFC (Durand Cup)
- Biggest defeat: 0–4 United Chirang Duar (Oil Gold Cup)
Home colours	Away colours	Third colours

The 2025–26 season was the club's 12th season in Indian Super League since its establishment in 2014. In addition to the league, they also competed in the Durand Cup and AIFF Super Cup. On 23 August 2025, NorthEast United won their 2nd Durand Cup title after defeating Diamond Harbour in the final. This was their consecutive Durand Cup title.

== Personnel ==
As of 1 July 2025

Position	Name	Refs.
Head coach	(Spain) Juan Pedro Benali	
Assistant coach	(Spain) Sergio Sesi	
Assistant coach	(India) Naushad Moosa	
Goalkeeping coach	(Spain) Manuel Diez Aznar	
Strength and Conditioning coach	(Spain) Javier Caballero	
Team analyst	(India) Amogh Adige	
Physiotherapists	(India) Kapil Sharma (India) Dileep Kumar Jagadesan (India) Sony Chittilappilly Sunny	
Club doctor	(India) Dr Abhinav	
Reserves and U-18 head coach	(India)	

== Players ==
As of 13 July 2025

Note: Flags indicate national team as defined under FIFA eligibility rules; some limited exceptions apply. Players may hold more than one non-FIFA nationality.

No.	Pos.	Nation	Player
1	GK	IND	Gurmeet Singh
2	DF	IND	Dinesh Singh Soraisham
3	DF	IND	Tondonba Singh Ngasepam
4	DF	ESP	Míchel Zabaco (captain)
7	FW	ESP	Jairo Samperio
11	FW	IND	Parthib Gogoi
12	DF	IND	Asheer Akhtar
13	MF	IND	Mayakkannan
15	MF	IND	Macarton Nickson
16	FW	IND	Ankith Padmanabhan
17	DF	IND	Robin Yadav

No.	Pos.	Nation	Player
18	MF	ESP	Andy Rodríguez
19	MF	IND	Thoi Singh Huidrom
20	GK	IND	Dipesh Chauhan
21	FW	IND	Lalrinzuala Lalbiaknia
22	MF	IND	Redeem Tlang
23	MF	IND	Bekey Oram
24	FW	IND	Lalbiakdika Vanlalvunga
29	MF	IND	Mohammed Arshaf
30	MF	IND	Danny Meitei Laishram
35	GK	IND	Arman Tamang
66	FW	IND	Fredy Chawngthansanga
77	DF	IND	Buanthanglun Samte
80	FW	IND	Jithin MS

== Competitions ==
Competition	First match	Last match	Starting round	Final position	Record							
Competition	First match	Last match	Starting round	Final position	Pld	W	D	L	GF	GA	GD	Win %
Durand Cup	2 August 2025	23 August 2025	Group stage	Winners	6	5	1	0	18	5	+13	83.33
Super Cup	26 October 2025	1 November 2025	Group stage	Group stage	3	1	2	0	6	5	+1	33.33
Indian Super League	16 February 2026	19 May 2026	League stage	9th	13	4	4	5	16	21	−5	30.77
Oil India Challenge Gold Cup (Note: NorthEast United fielded their Reserve squad for the tournament.)	23 October 2025	23 October 2025	Quarter-final	Quarter-final	1	0	0	1	0	4	−4	0.00
Total					23	10	7	6	40	35	+5	43.48

Source: Competitions

=== Durand Cup ===
==== Group stage ====
Pos	Team	Pld	W	D	L	GF	GA	GD	Pts	Qualification	NEU	SHI	(Malaysia) MAS	RDU
1	NorthEast United	3	2	1	0	7	4	+3	7	knockout stage		2–1	3–1	2–2
2	Shillong Lajong (H)	3	2	0	1	10	3	+7	6	knockout stage			6–0	3–1
3	(Malaysia) Armed Forces	3	1	0	2	2	9	−7	3					1–0
4	Rangdajied United (H)	3	0	1	2	3	6	−3	1					

Source: DFTS
Rules for classification: Group stage tiebreakers
(H) Hosts

2 August 2025 Match 16	NorthEast United	3–1	(Malaysia) Armed Forces	Shillong, Meghalaya
19:00 IST	Ajaraie 23', 29', 70'	Report; PDF Report	Amir 88'	Stadium: Jawaharlal Nehru Stadium; Attendance: 3,000; Referee: Senthil Nathan S Man of the Match: Alaaeddine Ajaraie (NorthEast United)

8 August 2025 Match 28	Shillong Lajong	1–2	NorthEast United	Shillong, Meghalaya
19:00 IST	Figo Syndai 81'	Report; PDF Report	Ajaraie 5', 83'	Stadium: Jawaharlal Nehru Stadium; Attendance: 13,900; Referee: Pratik Mondal; Man of the Match: Alaaeddine Ajaraie (NorthEast United)

11 August 2025 Match 34	NorthEast United	2–2	Rangdajied United	Shillong, Meghalaya
19:00 IST	Oram 24'; Jairo 76'	Report; PDF Report	Iawphniaw 32'; Danzel 44'	Stadium: Jawaharlal Nehru Stadium; Attendance: 4,439; Referee: Senthil Nathan S Man of the Match: Manbhakupar Iawphniaw (Rangdajied United)

==== Knockout stage ====
Quarter-finals
16 Aug – Shillong
Shillong Lajong	2
Indian Navy	1
16 Aug – Kokrajhar
Bodoland	0
NorthEast United	4
17 Aug – Jamshedpur
Jamshedpur	0
Diamond Harbour	2
17 Aug – Kolkata
East Bengal	2
Mohun Bagan	1

Semi-finals
19 Aug – Shillong
Shillong Lajong	0
NorthEast United	1
20 Aug – Kolkata
Diamond Harbour	2
East Bengal	1

Final
23 Aug – Kolkata
NorthEast United	6
Diamond Harbour	1

16 August 2025 Match 38 (2nd Quarter-finals)	Bodoland	0–4	NorthEast United	Kokrajhar (BTR), Assam
19:00 IST		Report; PDF Report	Ajaraie 29', 61'; Andy 53'; Parthib 90+1'	Stadium: SAI Stadium; Attendance: 14,970; Referee: Surajit Das; Man of the Match: Alaaeddine Ajaraie (NorthEast United)

19 August 2025 Match 41 (1st Semi-finals)	Shillong Lajong	0–1	NorthEast United	Shillong, Meghalaya
19:00 IST		Report; PDF Report	Tlang 36'	Stadium: Jawaharlal Nehru Stadium; Attendance: 14,911; Referee: Senthil Nathan (sub. Lalit Singh Rawat); Man of the Match: Redeem Tlang (NorthEast United)

23 August 2025 Final	NorthEast United	6–1	Diamond Harbour	Kolkata, West Bengal
17:30 IST	Akhtar 30'; Gogoi 45+1'; Ngasepam 50'; Samperio 81'; Rodríguez 85'; Ajaraie 90+3' (pen.)	Report; PDF Report	Majcen 68'	Stadium: Vivekananda Yuba Bharati Krirangan; Attendance: 16,920; Referee: Venkatesh Ramachadran; Man of the Match: Alaaeddine Ajaraie (NorthEast United)

=== AIFF Super Cup ===
The virtual official draw ceremony of the Super Cup was held on Sept 25 at 4pm.

Group stage

Pos	Team	Pld	W	D	L	GF	GA	GD	Pts	Qualification	GOA	NEU	JFC	INK
1	Goa (H)	3	2	0	1	6	2	+4	6	Advance to knockout stage		1–2	2–0	3–0
2	NorthEast United	3	1	2	0	6	5	+1	5				2–2	2–2
3	Jamshedpur	3	1	1	1	4	4	0	4					2–0
4	Inter Kashi	3	0	1	2	2	7	−5	1					

Source: AIFF
Rules for classification: 1)1) points; 2) head-to-head points; 3) head-to-head goal difference; 4) goal difference; 5) number of goals scored; 6) Penalty shoot-out if only two teams are tied and they met in the last round of the group; 7) Disciplinary points; 8) drawing of lots
(H) Hosts

26 October 2025 Group Stage	NorthEast United	2–2	Inter Kashi	Bambolim
16:30 IST	Ajaraie 18'; Zabaco 40'	I-League; PDF Report	Harmanpreet 5'; Karthik 74'	Stadium: GMC Athletic Stadium; Attendance: 226; Referee: Harish Kundu; Man of the Match: Karthik Panicker (Inter Kashi)

29 October 2025 Group Stage	NorthEast United	2–2	Jamshedpur	Bambolim
16:30 IST	Chema 20'; Ajaraie 29'}	I-League; PDF Report	Halder 43'; Messi Bouli 89'	Stadium: GMC Athletic Stadium; Attendance: 467; Referee: Tejas Nagvenkar

1 November 2025 Group Stage	Goa	1–2	NorthEast United	Margao, Goa
19:30 IST	Sahil 72'	I-League; PDF Report	Chema 68'; Robin Yadav 77'	Stadium: Jawaharlal Nehru Stadium; Attendance: 1,723; Referee: Crystal John; Man of the Match: Dipesh Chauhan (NorthEast United)

=== Indian Super League ===
==== League table ====
Pos	Team	Pld	W	D	L	GF	GA	GD	Pts	Qualification
7	Goa	13	5	5	3	15	11	+4	20	Qualified for the Champions League Two qualifying playoffs (Note: Goa qualified for the AFC Champions League Two qualifying playoffs as the 2025–26 AIFF Super Cup winners.)
8	Kerala Blasters	13	5	2	6	15	17	−2	17	
9	NorthEast United	13	4	4	5	16	21	−5	16	
10	Inter Kashi	12	3	4	5	10	15	−5	13	
11	Delhi	12	2	5	5	12	15	−3	11	

Updated to match(es) played on 19 May 2026. Source: Indian Super League
Rules for classification: 1) points; 2) goal difference; 3) number of goals scored; 4) head-to-head points; 5) head-to-head goal difference; 6) head-to-head goals scored; 7) fair play ranking; 8) drawing of lots.
(Note: Head-to-head record is used only after all the matches between the teams in question have been played).

=== Oil India Challenge Gold Cup ===
NorthEast United also participated in the 8th Oil India Challenge Gold Cup held at Duliajan, Assam and fielded mostly their reserve squad for the tournament. They started the tournament directly from the quarter-final.

==== Bracket ====
Quarter-finals
24 Oct
Shillong Lajong	3
Assam Police	1
25 Oct
East Bengal II	0
Oil India	1
23 Oct
NorthEast United II	0
United Chirang Duar	4
26 Oct
Diamond Harbour	1
TRAU	0

Semi-finals
27 Oct
Shillong Lajong	1
Oil India	0
28 Oct
United Chirang Duar	1
Diamond Harbour	4

Final
30 Oct
Shillong Lajong	0
Diamond Harbour	2

23 October 2025 Quarter-final	NorthEast United	0–4	United Chirang Duar	Duliajan
17:30 IST		Report	Timothi ?'; Jehova ?'; Kaushik ?'; Uttam ?'	Stadium: Nehru Maidan

== Statistics ==
=== Goalscorers ===
Rank	Nat.	Player	Durand Cup	Super Cup	ISL	Total
1	(Morocco)	Alaaeddine Ajaraie	8	1	0	9
2	(Spain)	Jairo Samperio	2	0	0	2
3	(India)	Parthib Gogoi	2	0	0	2
4	(Spain)	Andy Rodríguez	2	0	0	2
5	(India)	Redeem Tlang	1	0	0	1
6	(India)	Asheer Akhtar	1	0	0	1
7	(India)	Bekey Oram	1	0	0	1
8	(India)	Tondonba Singh Ngasepam	1	0	0	1
9	(Spain)	Míchel Zabaco	0	1	0	1
