= 2025 Durand Cup final =

Final of the 134th edition of the Durand Cup

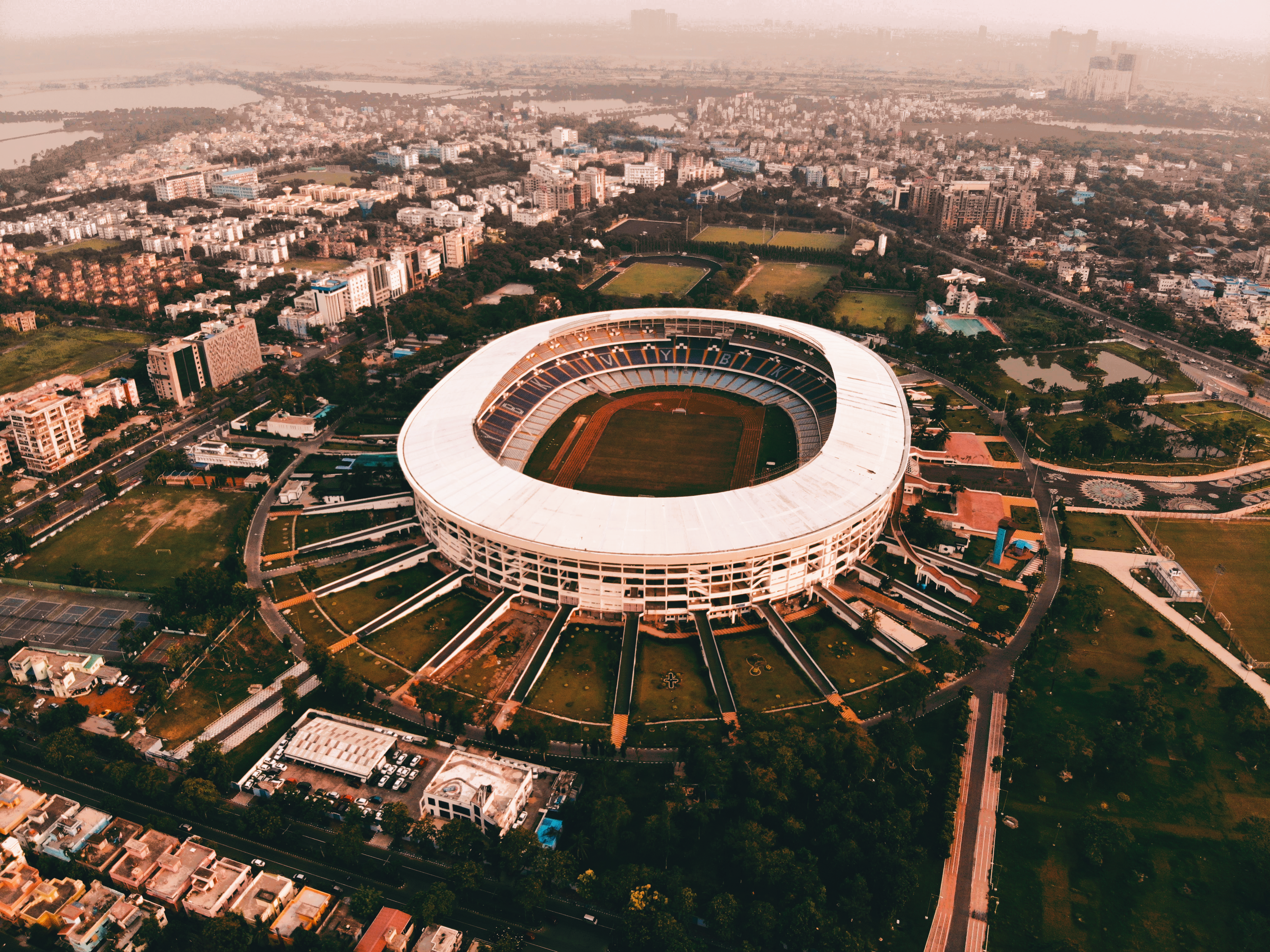
- The final match was held at the Vivekananda Yuba Bharati Krirangan in Kolkata.
- Event: 2025 Durand Cup
NorthEast United	Diamond Harbour
6	1
- Date: 23 August 2025
- Venue: Vivekananda Yuba Bharati Krirangan, Kolkata
- Man of the Match: (Morocco) Alaaeddine Ajaraie (NorthEast United)
- Referee: Venkatesh Ramachadran
- Attendance: 16,920
- Weather: Partly clear Cloudy; 27 °C (81 °F); 94% humidity

The 2025 Durand Cup final was the final match of the 2025 Durand Cup, the 134th edition of Asia's oldest football tournament. The tournament was organised by the Durand Football Tournament Society (DFTS) in co-operation with the AIFF, Eastern Command of the Indian Armed Forces and the Government of West Bengal, supported by the governments Assam, Meghalaya, Manipur and Jharkhand. It was held on 23 August 2025 at the Vivekananda Yuba Bharati Krirangan in Kolkata, West Bengal, India.

== Route to the final ==
Note: In all results below, the score of the finalist is given first.

NorthEast United		Round	Diamond Harbour	
Opponent	Result	Group stage	Opponent	Result
Armed Forces	3–1	Matchday 1	Mohammedan	2–1
Shillong Lajong	2–1	Matchday 2	BSF FT	8–1
Rangdajied United	2–2	Matchday 3	Mohun Bagan	1–5
Group E Winners: Pos / Team / Pld / Pts; 1 / NorthEast United / 3 / 7; 2 / Shillong Lajong (H) / 3 / 6; 3 / (Malaysia) Armed Forces / 3 / 3; 4 / Rangdajied United (H) / 3 / 1; Source: DFTS (H) Hosts		Final standings	Group B runner-up: Pos / Team / Pld / Pts; 1 / Mohun Bagan (H) / 3 / 9; 2 / Diamond Harbour / 3 / 6; 3 / Mohammedan (H) / 3 / 3; 4 / Border Security Force / 3 / 0; Source: DFTS (H) Hosts	
Opponent	Result	Knockout stage	Opponent	Result
Bodoland	4–0	Quarter-finals	Jamshedpur	2–0
Shillong Lajong	1–0	Semi-finals	East Bengal	2–1

Bracket

Quarter-finals
16 Aug – Shillong
Shillong Lajong	2
Indian Navy	1
16 Aug – Kokrajhar
Bodoland	0
NorthEast United	4
17 Aug – Jamshedpur
Jamshedpur	0
Diamond Harbour	2
17 Aug – Kolkata
East Bengal	2
Mohun Bagan	1

Semi-finals
19 Aug – Shillong
Shillong Lajong	0
NorthEast United	1
20 Aug – Kolkata
Diamond Harbour	2
East Bengal	1

Final
23 Aug – Kolkata
NorthEast United	6
Diamond Harbour	1

== Match ==
23 August 2025
17:30 IST

NorthEast United	6–1	Diamond Harbour
Akhtar 30'; Gogoi 45+1'; Ngasepam 50'; Samperio 81'; Rodríguez 85'; Ajaraie 90+3' (pen.)	Report; PDF	Majcen 68'

Vivekananda Yuba Bharati Krirangan, Kolkata, West Bengal
Attendance: 16,920

NEUFC	Diamond Harbour

Man of the Match:
Alaaeddine Ajaraie (NorthEast United)
Assistant referees:
Parasuraman Vairamuthu
P. Muralitharan
Fourth official:
Ashwin Kumar
Match commissioner:
Palliri Sujesh Rajan
Referee assessor:
Walter Edward Pereira
Media officer:
Sujesh Rajan Palliri

== See also ==
- 2025 Indian Super League final
- 2025 Kalinga Super Cup final
