= 2026–27 Mohammedan SC (Kolkata) season =

Indian football club season

Mohammedan
2025–26 season
- Owner: Mohammedan Sporting Club Private Limited (100%)
- Chairman: Gulam Ashraf
- Head coach: Mehrajuddin Wadoo
- Stadium: Salt Lake Stadium; Kishore Bharati Krirangan
- Indian Super League: 14th (Relegated)
- Super Cup: Group stage
- 2025 Durand Cup: Group stage
- Calcutta Football League: Relegation Round
- Biggest win: Mohammedan 6–1 Railway (2025 CFL)
- Biggest defeat: East Bengal 7–0 Mohammedan (2026 ISL)
Home colours	Away colours

The 2025–26 season was the 133rd season in the existence of Mohammedan and their second season in the Indian Super League following promotion from I-League, they also compete in the Durand Cup and Indian Super Cup.

At the first of the season, Mohammedan management faced huge issues regarding investor protocols as Bunkerhill Private Limited cut all ties with the club. So, club management decided to bring new investors by the start of ISL. Moreover, FIFA handed player registration ban on Mohammedan due to not fulfilling the payments of foreign players of previous season, thus forcing all foreigners to leave the club immediately. With huge debt on head, the club has fielded their all-Indian squad in Durand Cup, Calcutta Football League and AIFF Super Cup at their own costs.

In the Calcutta Football League, for the first time in history of 133 years, Mohammedan finished in the bottom six of Premier Division league and got relieved from relegation with slight difference in points.

== Players ==
As of February 2025

Note: Flags indicate national team as defined under FIFA eligibility rules; some limited exceptions apply. Players may hold more than one non-FIFA nationality.

No.	Pos.	Nation	Player
1	GK	IND	Padam Chettri
4	DF	IND	Pukhrambam Dinesh Meitei (captain)
5	DF	IND	Gaurav Bora
6	MF	IND	Abhishek Halder
7	FW	IND	Rochharzela
8	MF	IND	Amarjit Singh Kiyam
10	MF	IND	Tangva Ragui
13	MF	IND	Sajal Bag
14	DF	IND	Zodingliana Ralte (vice-captain)
16	DF	IND	Mohammed Irshad
17	FW	IND	Thokchom Adison Singh
18	MF	IND	Jeremy Laldinpuia

No.	Pos.	Nation	Player
19	FW	IND	Makan Chothe
22	FW	IND	Ashley Alban Koli
24	DF	IND	Joe Zoherliana
27	GK	IND	Bhaskar Roy
29	FW	IND	Lalremsanga Fanai
34	DF	IND	Vanlalzuidika
55	DF	IND	Mohammed Jassim
66	DF	IND	Sajad Hussain Parray
71	GK	IND	Subhajit Bhattacharjee
75	FW	IND	Soraisam Robinson Singh
—	GK	IND	Nikhil Deka

== Personnel ==
=== Technical staff ===
As of February 2025

Position	Name
Head coach	(India) Mehrajuddin Wadoo
Assistant coach	(India) Alison Kharsyntiew
Goalkeeping coach	(India) Lalit Thapa
Physio	(India) Soumya Bhattacharjee
Physio	(India) Md. Belal Qureshi
Strength & conditioning coach	(India) Arsalan Mirza
Performance analyst	(India) Devrup J. Gupta
Masseur	(India) Samir Biswas

== Competitions ==
Competition	First match	Last match	Starting round	Final position	Record							
Competition	First match	Last match	Starting round	Final position	Pld	W	D	L	GF	GA	GD	Win %
Durand Cup	28 July 2025	7 August 2025	Group stage	Group stage	3	1	0	2	5	5	+0	33.33
Super Cup	30 October 2025	5 November 2025	Group stage	Group stage	3	0	0	3	0	8	−8	0.00
Indian Super League	15 February 2026	19 May 2026	Regular season	14th (Relegated)	13	0	3	10	7	32	−25	0.00
Calcutta Football League (Note: Mohammedan fielded mostly their reserve squad for the tournament, with Alison Kharsyntiew taking charge as the head coach.)	27 June 2025	14 September 2025	Group stage	Relegation Round	13	4	2	7	20	20	+0	30.77
Total					32	5	5	22	32	65	−33	15.63

Source: Competitions

=== Durand Cup ===
==== Group stage ====
Pos	Team	Pld	W	D	L	GF	GA	GD	Pts	Qualification	MBG	DIH	MSC	BSF
1	Mohun Bagan (H)	3	3	0	0	12	2	+10	9	knockout stage		5–1	3–1	4–0
2	Diamond Harbour	3	2	0	1	11	7	+4	6	knockout stage			2–1	8–1
3	Mohammedan (H)	3	1	0	2	5	5	0	3					3–0
4	Border Security Force	3	0	0	3	1	15	−14	0					

Source: DFTS
Legend: Blue = home team win; Yellow = draw; Red = away team win.
Rules for classification: Group stage tiebreakers
(H) Hosts

28 July 2025 Match 6	Mohammedan	1–2	Diamond Harbour	Kolkata, West Bengal
19:00 IST	T. Adison 36'	Report; PDF Report	S. Kima 51'; Majcen 90+10'	Stadium: Vivekananda Yuba Bharati Krirangan; Attendance: 1,925; Referee: Lakshay; Man of the Match: Sairuat Kima (Diamond Harbour)

31 July 2025 Match 12	Mohun Bagan	3–1	Mohammedan	Kolkata, West Bengal
19:00 IST	Colaco 23', 90+6' (pen.); Apuia (red card) 43'; S. Bhat 63'	Report; PDF Report	A. Koli 50'	Stadium: Vivekananda Yuba Bharati Krirangan; Attendance: 6,584; Referee: Aditya Purkayastha; Man of the Match: Liston Colaco (Mohun Bagan)

7 August 2025 Match 26	BSF FT	0–3	Mohammedan	Kolkata, West Bengal
19:00 IST		Report; PDF Report	Sajal 5'; Maxiom 21', 30'	Stadium: Kishore Bharati Krirangan; Attendance: 348; Referee: Kishor Gangaram Choudhari; Man of the Match: Maharabam Maxiom (Mohammedan)

=== Calcutta Football League ===
==== Group stage ====
Pos	Team	Pld	W	D	L	GF	GA	GD	Pts	Qualification	UTD	DIH	UKS	BHA	PRL	RNB	SRB	KID	WAR	ARY	MDS	CPC	SOU
9	Wari	12	4	1	7	10	26	−16	13				0–5		1–1	0–4	1–5			3–2			1–0
10	Aryan	12	4	0	8	9	18	−9	12					1–0	1–0		0–1					1–0	3–1
11	Mohammedan	12	3	2	7	14	19	−5	11	Relegation round				1–2	0–1				1–2	1–0			
12	Calcutta Police Club	12	1	1	10	8	28	−20	4	Relegation round			0–1	0–4	0–2				1–2		2–2		
13	Southern Samity	12	0	2	10	10	28	−18	0 (Note: Southern Samity were deducted 2 points as punishment for not playing match vs Diamond Harbour.)	Relegation round	0–2	0–3 (Note: Southern Samity gave walkover, resulting a 0–3 victory for Diamond Harbour.)	3–4	0–2		0–0	2–2	2–6			1–2	0–1	

Source: The Away End
Legend: Blue = home team win; Yellow = draw; Red = away team win.
Rules for classification: 1) points; 2) head-to-head points; 3) head-to-head goal difference; 4) goal difference; 5) number of goals scored; 6) drawing of lots
Notes:

Relegation Round

Pos	Team	Pld	W	D	L	GF	GA	GD	Pts	Qualification	MDS	KMS	RLY	CPC	SOU (Note: Southern Samity gave walkover against Mohammedan and Kalighat MS respectively and subsequently withdrew from competition after no chance of exempting relegation; IFA cancelled all other remaining matches.)	AR (Note: Army Red didn't field their team in Relegation stage, thus IFA gave free 3 points to all other teams of Group A with 3–0 victory.)
1	Mohammedan	14	5	2	7	23	20	+3	17			ABN	6–1	ABN	3–0	
2	Kalighat MS	13	4	3	6	15	16	−1	15				ABN	ABN	3–0	
3	Railway FC	13	1	4	8	5	26	−21	7					0–0	ABN	
4	Calcutta Police Club	13	1	2	10	8	28	−20	5						ABN	
5	Southern Samity (Note: Southern Samity gave walkover against Mohammedan and Kalighat MS respectively and subsequently withdrew from competition after no chance of exempting relegation; IFA cancelled all other remaining matches.) (R)	14	0	2	12	10	34	−24	0 (Note: Southern Samity were deducted 2 points as punishment for not playing match vs Diamond Harbour.)	Relegated to First Division						

Source: The Away End
Legend: Blue = home team win; Yellow = draw; Red = away team win.
Rules for classification: 1) points; 2) head-to-head points; 3) head-to-head goal difference; 4) goal difference; 5) number of goals scored; 6) drawing of lots
(R) Relegated

=== Super Cup ===
==== Group stage ====
Pos	Team	Pld	W	D	L	GF	GA	GD	Pts	Qualification	PFC	BFC	GOK	MDS
1	Punjab	3	2	1	0	6	0	+6	7 (Note: Punjab qualified after winning the penalty shoot-out.)	Advance to knockout stage		0–0	3–0	3–0
2	Bengaluru	3	2	1	0	6	0	+6	7				4–0	2–0
3	Gokulam Kerala	3	1	0	2	3	7	−4	3					3–0
4	Mohammedan	3	0	0	3	0	8	−8	0					

Source: AIFF
Legend: Blue = home team win; Yellow = draw; Red = away team win.
Rules for classification: 1) points; 2) head-to-head points; 3) head-to-head goal difference; 4) goal difference; 5) number of goals scored; 6) Penalty shoot-out if only two teams are tied and they met in the last round of the group; 7) Disciplinary points; 8) drawing of lots
Notes:

30 October 2025 Match 12	Bengaluru	2–0	Mohammedan	Fatorda
19:30 IST	Taorem 34'; Chhetri 86' (pen.)	I-League; PDF Report		Stadium: Fatorda Stadium; Attendance: 232; Referee: Venkatesh Ramachandran; Man of the Match: Taorem Kelvin Singh (Bengaluru)

2 November 2025 Match 17	Mohammedan	0–3	Punjab	Bambolim
16:30 IST		I-League; PDF Report	Ninthoi 27'; Zeljković 43'; Kipgen 73'	Stadium: GMC Athletic Stadium; Attendance: 123; Referee: Tejas Nagvenkar

5 November 2025 Match 21	Gokulam Kerala	3–0	Mohammedan	Bambolim
16:30 IST	Torras 28'; Kynshi 56'; Azorin 86'	I-League; PDF Report		Stadium: GMC Athletic Stadium; Attendance: 100; Referee: Crystal John

=== Indian Super League ===
==== League table ====
Pos	Team	Pld	W	D	L	GF	GA	GD	Pts	Qualification
10	Inter Kashi	13	3	4	6	11	17	−6	13	
11	Odisha	13	2	5	6	14	22	−8	11 (Note: Head-to-head points: Odisha 3, Delhi 0.)	
12	Delhi	13	2	5	6	13	17	−4	11	
13	Chennaiyin	13	2	3	8	9	21	−12	9	
14	Mohammedan (R)	13	0	3	10	7	32	−25	3	Relegation to IFL

Source: Indian Super League
Rules for classification: 1) points; 2) goal difference; 3) number of goals scored; 4) head-to-head points; 5) head-to-head goal difference; 6) head-to-head goals scored; 7) fair play ranking; 8) drawing of lots.
(Note: Head-to-head record is used only after all the matches between the teams in question have been played).
(R) Relegated
