= List of NorthEast United FC seasons =

NorthEast United FC is an Indian professional football club based in Guwahati, Assam. The club was founded on 13 April 2014 during the inaugural season of Indian Super League. NorthEast United represent the 8 states of India known as North East India which consist Assam, Nagaland, Manipur, Meghalaya, Sikkim, Arunachal Pradesh, Tripura and Mizoram.

== Key ==
Key to colours and symbols:

C	Champions
RU	Runners-up
SF	Semi-finals
⭐	Top scorer in division
🇮🇳	Top Indian scorer in division

Key to league record:

- Season = The year and article of the season
- Finals = Final position
- KO = Knockouts
- SF = Semi-finals
- RU = Runners-up
- C = Champions
- Pld = Matches played
- W = Matches won
- D = Matches drawn
- L = Matches lost
- GF = Goals scored
- GA = Goals against
- Pts = Point

Key to cup record:

- En-dash (–) = NorthEast United did not participate or cup not held
- GS = Group stage
- R32 = Round of 32
- R16 = Round of 16
- QF = Quarter-finals
- SF = Semi-finals
- RU = Runners-up
- C = Champions

== Seasons ==
As of 21 May 2026

Season	League										Super Cup	Durand Cup	Asia	League top scorer(s)	
Season	Pld	W	D	L	GF	GA	GD	Pts	Position	Playoffs	Super Cup	Durand Cup	Asia	Player(s)	Goals
2014	14	3	6	5	11	13	-2	15	8th	DNQ	Did not exist	Did not exist for ISL clubs	No Qualification from ISL	(Spain) Koke	4
2015	14	6	2	6	18	23	-5	20	5th	DNQ	Did not exist	Did not exist for ISL clubs	No Qualification from ISL	(Argentina) Nicolás Vélez	5
2016	14	5	3	6	14	14	0	18	5th	DNQ	Did not exist	Did not exist for ISL clubs	No Qualification from ISL	(Uruguay) Emiliano Alfaro	5
2017–18	18	3	2	13	12	27	-15	11	10th	DNQ	Qualification round	–	No Qualification from ISL	(India) Len Doungel & (Brazil) Marcinho	4
2018–19	18	7	8	3	22	18	+4	29	4th	SF	QF	–	No Qualification from ISL	(Nigeria) Bart Ogbeche	12
2019–20	18	2	8	8	16	30	-14	13	9th	DNQ	–	–	DNQ	(Ghana) Asamoah Gyan	4
2020–21	20	8	9	3	31	25	+6	33	3rd	SF	–	–	DNQ	(Portugal) Luís Machado	7
2021–22	20	3	5	12	25	43	-18	14	10th	DNQ	–	–	DNQ	(Jamaica) Deshorn Brown	7
2022–23	20	1	2	17	20	55	-35	5	11th	DNQ	SF	GS	DNQ	(Colombia) Wilmar Jordán	8
2023–24	22	6	8	8	28	32	-4	26	7th	DNQ	GS	SF	DNQ	(Spain) Néstor Albiach, (India) Parthib Gogoi & (Australia) Tomi Juric	5
2024–25	24	10	8	6	46	29	+17	38	4th	KO	QF	C	DNQ	(Morocco) Alaaeddine Ajaraie	23
2025–26	13	4	4	5	16	21	-5	16	9th	–	GS	C	DNQ	(Spain) Andy Rodríguez	3
2026–27												SF			
