= 2025 Durand Cup group stage =

Group stage of 2025 Durand Cup

Tournament details
- Country: India
- Teams: 24

Tournament statistics
- Matches played: 36
- Goals scored: 124 (3.44 per match)
- Attendance: 298,433 (8,290 per match)
- Top goal scorer(s): (Morocco) Alaaeddine Ajaraie (NorthEast United) (India) Liston Colaco (Mohun Bagan) (5 goals)

The 2025 IndianOil Durand Cup group stage was played from 23 July to 12 August. A total of 6 ISL, 4 I-League, 2 I-League 2, 5 regional league, 5 Indian Armed Forces, and 2 foreign armed forces teams competed in the group stage to decide the 8 places in the knockout stage.

== Teams ==
The following teams have confirmed their participation.

Initially, Indonesian Army had assured to participate in this tournament but later on they withdrew their name and was replaced by Malaysian Army.

Team	Location
Indian Super League teams
East Bengal	Kolkata, West Bengal
Jamshedpur	Jamshedpur, Jharkhand
Mohammedan	Kolkata, West Bengal
Mohun Bagan	Kolkata, West Bengal
NorthEast United	Guwahati, Assam
Punjab	Mohali, Punjab
I-League teams
Shillong Lajong	Shillong, Meghalaya
Namdhari	Ludhiana, Punjab
Real Kashmir	Srinagar, Jammu & Kashmir
Diamond Harbour	Diamond Harbour, West Bengal
I-League 2 teams
NEROCA	Imphal, Manipur
Morning Star	Diphu, Assam
State league teams
1 Ladakh	Leh, Ladakh
Rangdajied United	Shillong, Meghalaya
TRAU	Imphal, Manipur
Bodoland	Kokrajhar (BTR), Assam
South United	Bengaluru, Karnataka
Indian Armed Forces teams
Indian Air Force	New Delhi, Delhi
Indian Army	New Delhi, Delhi
Indian Navy	Kochi, Kerala
ITB Police	Baddowal, Punjab
Border Security Force	Jalandhar, Punjab
Guest invitees/Foreign armed forces teams
(Malaysia) Armed Forces	Kuala Lumpur, Malaysia
(Nepal) Tribhuvan Army	Kathmandu, Nepal

== Format ==
Each group is played on a single round-robin format. The table-toppers & two best second-placed teams advance to the knockout stage.

== Centralised venues ==
On 4 July, Durand Cup organising committee announced that the tournament would be played across 5 cities : Kolkata, Jamshedpur, Imphal, Shillong, and Kokrajhar (BTR).

The six groups were assigned one centralised venue.

- Groups A & B: Vivekananda Yuba Bharati Krirangan, Kishore Bharati Krirangan
- Group C: JRD Tata Sports Complex
- Group D: SAI Stadium
- Group E: Jawaharlal Nehru Stadium
- Group F: Khuman Lampak Main Stadium

== Group A ==
Pos	Team	Pld	W	D	L	GF	GA	GD	Pts	Qualification	EAB	NAM	IAF	SOU
1	East Bengal (H)	3	3	0	0	12	1	+11	9	knockout stage		1–0	6–1	5–0
2	Namdhari	3	2	0	1	6	3	+3	6				4–2	2–0
3	Indian Air Force	3	0	1	2	5	12	−7	1					3–3
4	South United	3	0	1	2	3	10	−7	1					

Source: DFTS
Rules for classification: Group stage tiebreakers
(H) Hosts

=== Matches ===
23 July 2025 Match 1	East Bengal	5–0	South United	Kolkata, West Bengal
17:30 IST	Lalchungnunga 12'; Crespo 38' (pen.); B. Singh 80'; Diamantakos 88'; N. Mahesh 90'	Report; PDF Report		Stadium: Vivekananda Yuba Bharati Krirangan; Attendance: 18,546; Referee: Aditya Purkayastha; Man of the Match: Mahesh Singh (East Bengal)

27 July 2025 Match 5	Indian Air Force	3–3	South United	Kolkata, West Bengal
19:00 IST	Aqib 26'; Cyril 49'; Sankit Singh 90+6'	Report; PDF Report	Daniyal 4', 23', 84'	Stadium: Kishore Bharati Krirangan; Attendance: 258; Referee: Ajay Krishnan; Man of the Match: Makakmayum Daniyal (South United)

30 July 2025 Match 10	Namdhari	2–0	South United	Kolkata, West Bengal
19:00 IST	B. Singh 79'; Dé 85'	Report; PDF Report		Stadium: Kishore Bharati Krirangan; Attendance: 250; Referee: Kishor Gangaram Choudhari; Man of the Match: Sunil Singh (South United)

3 August 2025 Match 17	Namdhari	4–2	Indian Air Force	Kolkata, West Bengal
16:00 IST	Dé 38'; A. Singh 45'; D. Singh 60'; Lotjem 74'	Report; PDF Report	Vanlalpeka 7'; Sankit Singh 78'	Stadium: Vivekananda Yuba Bharati Krirangan; Attendance: 214; Referee: Ajay Krishnan; Man of the Match: Dé (Namdhari)

6 August 2025 Match 24	East Bengal	1–0	Namdhari	Kolkata, West Bengal
19:00 IST	Hamid 68'	Report; PDF Report		Stadium: Vivekananda Yuba Bharati Krirangan; Attendance: 6,292; Referee: Lakshay; Man of the Match: Mohammed Rashid (East Bengal)

10 August 2025 Match 32	East Bengal	6–1	Indian Air Force	Kolkata, West Bengal
19:00 IST	Hamid 7'; Bipin 26'; Anwar 64'; Rashid 68'; Saúl 85'; David 90+1'	Report PDF Report	Aman Khan 36'	Stadium: Kishore Bharati Krirangan; Attendance: 8,395; Referee: Shantan Agrawal; Man of the Match: Subhajit Basu (Indian Air Force)

== Group B ==
Pos	Team	Pld	W	D	L	GF	GA	GD	Pts	Qualification	MBG	DIH	MSC	BSF
1	Mohun Bagan (H)	3	3	0	0	12	2	+10	9	knockout stage		5–1	3–1	4–0
2	Diamond Harbour	3	2	0	1	11	7	+4	6	knockout stage			2–1	8–1
3	Mohammedan (H)	3	1	0	2	5	5	0	3					3–0
4	Border Security Force	3	0	0	3	1	15	−14	0					

Source: DFTS
Rules for classification: Group stage tiebreakers
(H) Hosts

=== Matches ===
28 July 2025 Match 6	Mohammedan	1–2	Diamond Harbour	Kolkata, West Bengal
19:00 IST	T. Adison 36'	Report; PDF Report	S. Kima 51'; Majcen 90+10'	Stadium: Vivekananda Yuba Bharati Krirangan; Attendance: 1,925; Referee: Lakshay; Man of the Match: Sairuat Kima (Diamond Harbour)

31 July 2025 Match 12	Mohun Bagan	3–1	Mohammedan	Kolkata, West Bengal
19:00 IST	Colaco 23', 90+6' (pen.); Apuia (red card) 43'; S. Bhat 63'	Report; PDF Report	A. Koli 50'	Stadium: Vivekananda Yuba Bharati Krirangan; Attendance: 6,584; Referee: Aditya Purkayastha; Man of the Match: Liston Colaco (Mohun Bagan)

1 August 2025 Match 14	Diamond Harbour	8–1	BSF FT	Kolkata, West Bengal
19:00 IST	Clayton 2', 35', 72', 90+3'; Majcen 7', 37'; Ramfangzauva 53'; J. Justin 67'	Report; PDF Report	Kishori 90'	Stadium: Kishore Bharati Krirangan; Attendance: 182; Referee: Shantan Agrawal; Man of the Match: Clayton (Diamond Harbour)

4 August 2025 Match 20	Mohun Bagan	4–0	BSF FT	Kolkata, West Bengal
19:00 IST	Manvir 24'; Liston 53', 58'; Sahal 61'	Report; PDF Report		Stadium: Kishore Bharati Krirangan; Attendance: 3,121; Referee: Ashwin; Man of the Match: Liston Colaco (Mohun Bagan)

7 August 2025 Match 26	BSF FT	0–3	Mohammedan	Kolkata, West Bengal
19:00 IST		Report; PDF Report	Sajal 5'; Maxiom 21', 30'	Stadium: Kishore Bharati Krirangan; Attendance: 348; Referee: Kishor Gangaram Choudhari; Man of the Match: Maharabam Maxiom (Mohammedan)

9 August 2025 Match 30	Diamond Harbour	1–5	Mohun Bagan	Kolkata, West Bengal
19:00 IST	Majcen 24'; Yendrembam (red card) 50'	Report; PDF Report	Thapa 19'; Maclaren 35'; Liston 51' (pen.); Sahal 64'; Cummings 80'	Stadium: Vivekananda Yuba Bharati Krirangan; Attendance: 8,592; Referee: Ashwin; Man of the Match: Liston Colaco (Mohun Bagan)

== Group C ==
Pos	Team	Pld	W	D	L	GF	GA	GD	Pts	Qualification	JAM	ARM	(Nepal) TRA	LAD
1	Jamshedpur (H)	3	3	0	0	6	2	+4	9	knockout stage		1–0	3–2	2–0
2	Indian Army	3	2	0	1	5	3	+2	6				1–0	4–2
3	(Nepal) Tribhuvan Army	3	0	1	2	3	5	−2	1					1–1
4	1 Ladakh	3	0	1	2	3	7	−4	1					

Source: DFTS
Rules for classification: Group stage tiebreakers
(H) Hosts

=== Matches ===
24 July 2025 Match 2	Jamshedpur	3–2	(Nepal) Tribhuvan Army	Jamshedpur, Jharkhand
17:30 IST	Golui 4'; M. Singh 31'; Barla 71'	Report; PDF Report	Karki 26'; Tamang 64'	Stadium: JRD Tata Sports Complex; Attendance: 17,791; Referee: Mrityunjay L Amatya; Man of the Match: Manvir Singh (Jamshedpur)

29 July 2025 Match 7	Jamshedpur	1–0	Indian Army	Jamshedpur, Jharkhand
16:00 IST	Sanan 52'	Report; PDF Report	S. Kadir (red card) 90+2'	Stadium: JRD Tata Sports Complex; Attendance: 11,867; Referee: K Ramdasan; Man of the Match: Mohammed Sanan K (Jamshedpur)

2 August 2025 Match 15	Tribhuvan Army (Nepal)	1–1	1 Ladakh	Jamshedpur, Jharkhand
16:00 IST	Nirajan 40'	Report; PDF Report	Siju S 23'	Stadium: JRD Tata Sports Complex; Attendance: 1,263; Referee: Jehrul Islam; Man of the Match: Prajal Tushir (1 Ladakh)

5 August 2025 Match 21	Indian Army	1–0	(Nepal) Tribhuvan Army	Jamshedpur, Jharkhand
16:00 IST	Kamei 21'	Report; PDF Report		Stadium: JRD Tata Sports Complex; Attendance: 1,343; Referee: Jehrul Islam; Man of the Match: P Christopher Kamei (Indian Army)

8 August 2025 Match 27	Jamshedpur	2–0	1 Ladakh	Jamshedpur, Jharkhand
16:00 IST	Siju S 29' (o.g.); Praful Kumar 46'	Report; PDF Report		Stadium: JRD Tata Sports Complex; Attendance: 5,917; Referee: K Ramdasan; Man of the Match: Praful Kumar (Jamshedpur)

11 August 2025 Match 33	Indian Army	4–2	1 Ladakh	Jamshedpur, Jharkhand
16:00 IST	Somananda 41'; Abhishekh 45'; Kamei 51'; Rahul 55'	Report; PDF Report	P Kamalesh 23' (pen.); Vignesh 37'	Stadium: JRD Tata Sports Complex; Attendance: 1,074; Referee: Mrutyunjay L Amatya; Man of the Match: Abhishekh Shankar Powar (Indian Army)

== Group D ==
Pos	Team	Pld	W	D	L	GF	GA	GD	Pts	Qualification	BDO	PUN	ITB	KMS
1	Bodoland (H)	3	3	0	0	7	1	+6	9	knockout stage		1–0	4–0	2–1
2	Punjab	3	1	1	1	2	2	0	4				0–0	2–1
3	ITB Police	3	1	1	1	2	5	−3	4					2–1
4	Karbi Anglong Morning Star	3	0	0	3	3	6	−3	0					

Source: DFTS
Rules for classification: Group stage tiebreakers
(H) Hosts

=== Matches ===
27 July 2025 Match 4	ITBP FT	2–1	Morning Star	Kokrajhar (BTR), Assam
16:00 IST	Daimary 45'; Bhujel 60'	Report; PDF Report	B. Quansah (red card) 22'; L. Haokip 30'	Stadium: SAI Stadium; Attendance: 14,000; Referee: Jarvish Macwan; Man of the Match: Hemraj Bhujel (ITBP FT)

31 July 2025 Match 11	Bodoland	2–1	Morning Star	Kokrajhar (BTR), Assam
16:00 IST	Gayary 37'; Blandon 60'	Report; PDF Report	Olaleye 25'	Stadium: SAI Stadium; Attendance: 13,500; Referee: Surojit Das; Man of the Match: Robinson Blandon (Bodoland)

3 August 2025 Match 18	Morning Star	1–2	Punjab	Kokrajhar (BTR), Assam
19:00 IST	Olaleye 69'	Report; PDF Report	Pramveer 73'; Konsam 90+3'	Stadium: SAI Stadium; Attendance: 3,500; Referee: Harish Kundu; Man of the Match: Pramveer Singh (Punjab)

6 August 2025 Match 23	ITBP FT	0–0	Punjab	Kokrajhar (BTR), Assam
16:00 IST		Report; PDF Report		Stadium: SAI Stadium; Attendance: 500; Referee: Jarvish Macwan; Man of the Match: Donborlang Nongkynrih (ITBP FT)

9 August 2025 Match 29	Bodoland	1–0	Punjab	Kokrajhar (BTR), Assam
16:00 IST	Blandon 69'	Report; PDF Report		Stadium: SAI Stadium; Attendance: 12,545; Referee: Surojit Das; Man of the Match: Robinson Blandon (Bodoland)

12 August 2025 Match 36	ITBP FT	0–4	Bodoland	Kokrajhar (BTR), Assam
19:00 IST		Report; PDF Report	Timothi 25'; Pedro 37' (pen.); Gwgwmsar 40'; Abdul 82'	Stadium: SAI Stadium; Attendance: 12,540; Referee: Harish Kundu; Man of the Match: Pranjal Bhumij (Bodoland)

== Group E ==
Pos	Team	Pld	W	D	L	GF	GA	GD	Pts	Qualification	NEU	SHI	(Malaysia) MAS	RDU
1	NorthEast United	3	2	1	0	7	4	+3	7	knockout stage		2–1	3–1	2–2
2	Shillong Lajong (H)	3	2	0	1	10	3	+7	6	knockout stage			6–0	3–1
3	(Malaysia) Armed Forces	3	1	0	2	2	9	−7	3					1–0
4	Rangdajied United (H)	3	0	1	2	3	6	−3	1					

Source: DFTS
Rules for classification: Group stage tiebreakers
(H) Hosts

=== Matches ===
26 July 2025 Match 3	Shillong Lajong	6–0	(Malaysia) Armed Forces	Shillong, Meghalaya
16:00 IST	E. Sana 11', 66'; Buam 47', 49'; Lamurong 73'; Tongper 90+5'	Report; PDF Report		Stadium: Jawaharlal Nehru Stadium; Attendance: 6,000; Referee: Pratik Mondal; Man of the Match: Phrangki Buam (Shillong Lajong)

29 July 2025 Match 8	Shillong Lajong	3–1	Rangdajied United	Shillong, Meghalaya
19:00 IST	E. Sana 45+1'; Lyngdoh 66'; G. Kharbuli 80'	Report; PDF Report	Kurkalang 59'	Stadium: Jawaharlal Nehru Stadium; Attendance: 8,500; Referee: Lalit Singh Rawat; Man of the Match: Gladdy Nelcen Kharbuli (Shillong Lajong)

2 August 2025 Match 16	NorthEast United	3–1	(Malaysia) Armed Forces	Shillong, Meghalaya
19:00 IST	Ajaraie 23', 29', 70'	Report; PDF Report	Amir 88'	Stadium: Jawaharlal Nehru Stadium; Attendance: 3,000; Referee: Senthil Nathan S Man of the Match: Alaaeddine Ajaraie (NorthEast United)

5 August 2025 Match 22	Rangdajied United	0–1	(Malaysia) Armed Forces	Shillong, Meghalaya
19:00 IST		Report ]	Yasa 68'	Stadium: Jawaharlal Nehru Stadium; Man of the Match: Nasir Yasa (Armed Forces)

8 August 2025 Match 28	Shillong Lajong	1–2	NorthEast United	Shillong, Meghalaya
19:00 IST	Figo Syndai 81'	Report; PDF Report	Ajaraie 5', 83'	Stadium: Jawaharlal Nehru Stadium; Attendance: 13,900; Referee: Pratik Mondal; Man of the Match: Alaaeddine Ajaraie (NorthEast United)

11 August 2025 Match 34	NorthEast United	2–2	Rangdajied United	Shillong, Meghalaya
19:00 IST	Oram 24'; Jairo 76'	Report; PDF Report	Iawphniaw 32'; Danzel 44'	Stadium: Jawaharlal Nehru Stadium; Attendance: 4,439; Referee: Senthil Nathan S Man of the Match: Manbhakupar Iawphniaw (Rangdajied United)

== Group F ==
Pos	Team	Pld	W	D	L	GF	GA	GD	Pts	Qualification	NVY	RKS	NER	TRA
1	Indian Navy	3	2	1	0	4	2	+2	7	knockout stage		2–1	0–0	2–1
2	Real Kashmir	3	2	0	1	6	4	+2	6				3–1	2–1
3	NEROCA (H)	3	0	2	1	2	4	−2	2					1–1
4	TRAU (H)	3	0	1	2	3	5	−2	1					

Source: DFTS
Rules for classification: Group stage tiebreakers
(H) Hosts

=== Matches ===
30 July 2025 Match 9	TRAU	1–1	NEROCA	Imphal, Manipur
16:00 IST	K. Raj 58'; D. Mutum (yellow card) 26' (yellow-red card) 77'	Report; PDF Report	K. Arunkumar 90+7'	Stadium: Khuman Lampak Main Stadium; Attendance: 24,820; Referee: I Jamal Mohamed; Man of the Match: Sapam Nongpoknganba Singh (TRAU)

1 August 2025 Match 13	Indian Navy	2–1	Real Kashmir	Imphal, Manipur
16:00 IST	Marandi 6'; Sreyas 70'	Report; PDF Report	Sessegnon 70'	Stadium: Khuman Lampak Main Stadium; Attendance: 6,782; Referee: Dipu Roy; Man of the Match: Bhaskar Roy (Indian Navy)

4 August 2025 Match 19	TRAU	1–2	Real Kashmir	Imphal, Manipur
16:00 IST	Afridi 27'	Report; PDF Report	Marat 25'; Rohen 64'	Stadium: Khuman Lampak Main Stadium; Attendance: 20,180; Referee: Venkatesh Ramachadran; Man of the Match: Rohen Singh (Real Kashmir)

7 August 2025 Match 25	NEROCA	0–0	Indian Navy	Imphal, Manipur
16:00 IST	Zlex Khangjrakpam Mangang (red card) 90+6'	Report; PDF Report		Stadium: Khuman Lampak Main Stadium; Attendance: 18,150; Referee: Dipu Roy; Man of the Match: Adersh Mattummal (Indian Navy)

10 August 2025 Match 31	NEROCA	1–3	Real Kashmir	Imphal, Manipur
16:00 IST	Lucas; 67'	Report; PDF Report	Ranjan; 32': Marat 70'; Mbengue 82'	Stadium: Khuman Lampak Main Stadium; Attendance: 22,380; Referee: I Jamal Mohamed; Man of the Match: Ranjan Singh (Real Kashmir)

12 August 2025 Match 35	TRAU	1–2	Indian Navy	Imphal, Manipur
16:00 IST	Nelson 29'	Report; PDF Report	Pintu Mahata 87'; Sreyas Gopalan 90+2'	Stadium: Khuman Lampak Main Stadium; Attendance: 19,735; Referee: Venkatesh Ramachadran; Man of the Match: Sreyas Gopalan (Indian Navy)

== Ranking of 2nd placed teams ==
Pos	Grp	Team	Pld	W	D	L	GF	GA	GD	Pts	Qualification
1	E	Shillong Lajong	3	2	0	1	10	3	+7	6	knockout stage
2	B	Diamond Harbour	3	2	0	1	11	7	+4	6	knockout stage
3	A	Namdhari	3	2	0	1	6	3	+3	6	
4	F	Real Kashmir	3	2	0	1	6	4	+2	6	
5	C	Indian Army	3	2	0	1	5	3	+2	6	
6	D	Punjab	3	1	1	1	2	2	0	4	

Source: DFTS

== Statistics ==
=== Top scorers ===
Rank	Player	Team	Goals
1	(Morocco) Alaaeddine Ajaraie	NorthEast United	5
1	(India) Liston Colaco	Mohun Bagan	5
3	(Slovenia) Luka Majcen	Diamond Harbour	4
3	(Brazil) Clayton Silva	Diamond Harbour	4
5	(India) Makakmayum Daniyal	South United	3
5	(India) Everbrightson Sana	Shillong Lajong	3
7	(India) Phrangki Buam	Shillong Lajong	2
7	(Brazil) Dé	Namdhari	2
7	(Morocco) Hamid Ahadad	East Bengal	2
7	(Nigeria) Joseph Olaleye	KAMS	2
7	(India) Sankit Singh	Indian Air Force	2
7	(India) Sahal Abdul Samad	Mohun Bagan	2
7	(Colombia) Robinson Blandón	Bodoland	2
7	(Spain) Saúl Crespo	East Bengal	2
7	(India) Bipin Singh	East Bengal	2
7	(India) P Christopher Kamei	Indian Army	2
7	(India) Maharabam Maxion	Mohammedan	2
7	(Russia) Marat Tareck	Real Kashmir	2

=== Hat-tricks ===
Player	For	Against	Result	Date	Ref
(India) Makakmayum Daniyal	South United	Indian Air Force	3–3	27 July 2025	
(Brazil) Clayton Silva (4)	Diamond Harbour	BSF FT	8–1	1 August 2025	
(Morocco) Alaaeddine Ajaraie	NorthEast United	(Malaysia) Armed Forces	3–1	2 August 2025	

=== Top assists ===
Rank	Player	Team	Assists
1	(India) Sahal Abdul Samad	Mohun Bagan	4
2	(India) Girik Khosla	Diamond Harbour	3
2	(India) Samuel Lalmuanpuia	Diamond Habour	3
2	(India) Vincy Barretto	Jamshedpur FC	3
5	(Brazil) Miguel Figueira	East Bengal	2
5	(India) Tangva Ragui	Mohammedan	2
5	(India) Lalthankima	Mohammedan	2
5	(India) Roshan Panna	Indian Navy	2
5	(India) Yumnam Monis Singh	TRAU	2
5	(India) Treimiki Lamurong	Shillong Lajong	2
5	(Senegal) Seila Troure	Real Kashmir	2
5	(India) Joby Justin	Diamond Harbour	2
5	(India) N Rohen Singh	Real Kashmir	2
5	(Brazil) Clayton Silva	Diamond Harbour	2

=== Clean sheets ===
Rank	Player	Team	Clean sheets
1	(India) Amrit Gope	Jamshedpur	2
2	(India) Debjit Majumder	East Bengal	1
2	(India) Prabhsukhan Singh Gill	East Bengal	1
2	(India) Ravi Kumar	Punjab	1
2	(India) Siwel Rymbai	Shillong Lajong	1
2	(India) Gagandeep Singh	Army Red	1
2	(India) Niraj Kumar	Namdhari	1
2	(India) Jetli Sorokhaibam	NEROCA	1
2	(Malaysia) Mohammad Azarulhisham	(Malaysia) Armed Forces	1
2	(India) Bhaskar Roy	Indian Navy	1
2	(India) Vishal Kaith	Mohun Bagan	1
2	(Nepal) Samit Shrestha	(Nepal) Tribhuvan Army	1
2	(India) Subhajit Bhattacharjee	Mohammedan	1
