= 2025 Durand Cup knockout stage =

Football competition stage in India

Tournament details
- Country: India
- Teams: 8

Tournament statistics
- Matches played: 7
- Goals scored: 23 (3.29 per match)
- Attendance: 144,246 (20,607 per match)

The 2025 Durand Cup knockout stage began with the quarter-finals on 16 August, and concluded with the final match on 23 August 2025 at the Vivekananda Yuba Bharati Krirangan in Kolkata, West Bengal. A total of 8 teams competed in the knockout stage.

== Qualified teams ==
The top-placed team and the two best runners-up from each of the six groups will qualify for the knockout stage.

| Group | Winners | Best Runners-up (Best two qualify) |
|---|---|---|
| Group A | East Bengal | —N/a |
| Group B | Mohun Bagan | Diamond Harbour |
| Group C | Jamshedpur | —N/a |
| Group D | Bodoland | —N/a |
| Group E | NorthEast United | Shillong Lajong |
| Group F | Indian Navy | —N/a |

=== Ranking of second-placed teams ===
| Pos | Grp | Team | Pld | W | D | L | GF | GA | GD | Pts | Qualification |
|---|---|---|---|---|---|---|---|---|---|---|---|
| 1 | E | Shillong Lajong | 3 | 2 | 0 | 1 | 10 | 3 | +7 | 6 | knockout stage |
| 2 | B | Diamond Harbour | 3 | 2 | 0 | 1 | 11 | 7 | +4 | 6 | knockout stage |
| 3 | A | Namdhari | 3 | 2 | 0 | 1 | 6 | 3 | +3 | 6 | |
| 4 | F | Real Kashmir | 3 | 2 | 0 | 1 | 6 | 4 | +2 | 6 | |
| 5 | C | Indian Army | 3 | 2 | 0 | 1 | 5 | 3 | +2 | 6 | |
| 6 | D | Punjab | 3 | 1 | 1 | 1 | 2 | 2 | 0 | 4 | |

Source: DFTS

== Schedule ==
The schedule was as follows.

| Round | Dates |
|---|---|
| Quarter-finals | 16–17 August 2025 |
| Semi-finals | 19–20 August 2025 |
| Final | 23 August 2025 |

== Bracket ==
In the knockout stage, for any draws matches would be directly decided by a penalty shootout.

Quarter-finals
16 Aug – Shillong
Shillong Lajong | 2
Indian Navy | 1
16 Aug – Kokrajhar
Bodoland | 0
NorthEast United | 4
17 Aug – Jamshedpur
Jamshedpur | 0
Diamond Harbour | 2
17 Aug – Kolkata
East Bengal | 2
Mohun Bagan | 1

Semi-finals
19 Aug – Shillong
Shillong Lajong | 0
NorthEast United | 1
20 Aug – Kolkata
Diamond Harbour | 2
East Bengal | 1

Final
23 Aug – Kolkata
NorthEast United | 6
Diamond Harbour | 1

== Quarter-finals ==
16 August 2025
16:00 IST
Match 37

| Shillong Lajong | 2–1 | Indian Navy |
|---|---|---|
| Lyngdoh 69' (pen.); Everbrightson 80' | Report; PDF Report | Vijay Marandi 38' |

Jawaharlal Nehru Stadium, Shillong, Meghalaya
Attendance: 8,337
Referee: Pratik Mondal
Man of the Match: Everbrightson Mylliempdah (Shillong Lajong)

16 August 2025
19:00 IST
Match 38

| Bodoland | 0–4 | NorthEast United |
|---|---|---|
| | Report; PDF Report | Ajaraie 29', 61'; Andy 53'; Parthib 90+1' |

SAI Stadium, Kokrajhar (BTR), Assam
Attendance: 14,970
Referee: Surajit Das
Man of the Match: Alaaeddine Ajaraie (NorthEast United)

17 August 2025
16:00 IST
Match 39

| Jamshedpur | 0–2 | Diamond Harbour |
|---|---|---|
| | Report; PDF Report | Sairuat Kima 3', 41' |

JRD Tata Sports Complex, Jamshedpur, Jharkhand
Attendance: 11,472
Referee: Lakshay
Man of the Match: Sairuat Kima (Diamond Harbour)

17 August 2025
19:00 IST
Match 40

| East Bengal | 2–1 | Mohun Bagan |
|---|---|---|
| Diamantakos 38' (pen.), 52' | Report; PDF Report | Thapa 68' |

Vivekananda Yuba Bharati Krirangan, Kolkata, West Bengal
Attendance: 58,676
Referee: Venkatesh Ramachandran
Man of the Match: Dimitrios Diamantakos (East Bengal)

== Semi-finals ==
19 August 2025
19:00 IST
Match 41

| Shillong Lajong | 0–1 | NorthEast United |
|---|---|---|
| | Report; PDF Report | Tlang 36' |

Jawaharlal Nehru Stadium, Shillong, Meghalaya
Attendance: 14,911
Referee: Senthil Nathan (sub. Lalit Singh Rawat)
Man of the Match: Redeem Tlang (NorthEast United)

20 August 2025
19:00 IST
Match 42

| Diamond Harbour | 2–1 | East Bengal |
|---|---|---|
| Kortazar 66'; Justin 83' | Report; PDF Report | Anwar 67' |

Vivekananda Yuba Bharati Krirangan, Kolkata, West Bengal
Attendance: 18,960
Referee: Harish Kundu
Man of the Match: Mirshad Michu (Diamond Harbour)
