= Bekey Oram =

Indian footballer

Personal information
- Date of birth: 23 December 2003 (age 22)
- Place of birth: Chituapada, Jharsuguda, Odisha, India
- Position: Midfielder

Team information
- Current team: Samaleswari

Youth career
- 2016–2017: Odisha U17
- 2017–2020: Bengaluru B

Senior career*
Years	Team	Apps	(Gls)
2020–2023	Bengaluru B	8	(0)
2023–2026	NorthEast United	16	(0)
2026–	Samaleswari		

International career^{‡}
2017–2018	India U17		
2025–	India U23	2	(0)
- * Club domestic league appearances and goals as of 29 November 2024 ‡ National team caps and goals as of 10 October 2025

Bekey Oram (born 23 December 2003) is an Indian professional footballer who plays as a midfielder for the Indian Football League club Samaleswari. He has also represented India at the youth level internationally.

== Club career ==
Born in Chituapada, Odisha, Oram's football career started at an early age when he represented the Odisha state football team in the sub-junior and junior categories. In 2017, he joined the Bengaluru FC Academy where he progressed through the age groups, eventually joining the reserve team. He was part of the squad that clinched the Reliance Foundation Development League for two consecutive years.

=== NorthEast United ===
In 2023, Oram joined the NorthEast United squad for the 2023–24 Indian Super League season. He made his professional debut for the team on 4 October 2024 against Goa. He was part of the reserve squad which won the 2024 Sikkim Gold Cup.

== International career ==
Oram has represented India at the under-17 level. Oram was called up for the India under-23 team against Indonesia for the international friendlies in October 2025.

== Personal life ==
Oram's brother, Rakesh Oram, is also a professional footballer who plays for Sports Odisha and has represented India at the under-15 and under-19 levels.

== Career statistics ==
As of 20 March 2026

Club	Season	League			Cup		Others		Continental		Total	
Club	Season	Division	Apps	Goals	Apps	Goals	Apps	Goals	Apps	Goals	Apps	Goals
Bengaluru B	2019–20	I-League 2nd Division	6	2	0	0	0	0	—		6	2
Bengaluru B	2020–21	I-League 2nd Division	0	0	0	0	2 (Note: Appearance(s) in Durand Cup)	0	—		2	0
Bengaluru B	2022–23	I-League 2nd Division	2	0	0	0	0	0	—		2	0
NorthEast United	2023–24	Indian Super League	9	0	1 (Note: Appearance(s) in Super Cup)	0	3	0	—		13	0
NorthEast United	2024–25	Indian Super League	7	0	0	0	1	0	—		8	0
NorthEast United	2025–26	Indian Super League	2	0	1	0	3	1	—		6	1
Career total			26	2	2	0	9	1	0	0	37	3

== Honours ==
NorthEast United

- Durand Cup: 2024, 2025
- Sikkim Gold Cup: 2024

Karnataka

- Santosh Trophy: 2022–23
