= 2025 Durand Cup =

Football competition in India

IndianOil Durand Cup
- Logo of the 134th Durand Cup, 2025

Tournament details
- Country: India
- Venue(s): Imphal, Kokrajhar, Kolkata, Shillong, Jamshedpur
- Dates: 23 July – 23 August
- Teams: 24

Final positions
- Champions: NorthEast United (2nd title)
- Runners-up: Diamond Harbour

Tournament statistics
- Matches played: 43
- Goals scored: 147 (3.42 per match)
- Attendance: 442,679 (10,295 per match)
- Top goal scorer(s): (Morocco) Alaaeddine Ajaraie (NorthEast United) (8 goals)

The 2025 Durand Cup (also known as the IndianOil Durand Cup due to sponsorship ties with the Indian Oil Corporation) was the 134th edition of the Durand Cup, the oldest football tournament in Asia, and the fourth edition since it was supported by the Asian Football Confederation. The tournament is hosted by the Durand Football Tournament Society in co-operation with the AIFF, Eastern Command of the Indian Armed Forces and the Government of West Bengal, supported by the governments Assam, Meghalaya, Manipur and Jharkhand.

NorthEast United was the defending champions, having defeated Mohun Bagan in the 2024 final.

== Teams ==
The following teams had confirmed their participation. Initially, the Indonesian Army had assured to participate, but withdrew and was replaced by the Malaysian Armed Forces-MAFFA.

Locations of the participating teams
Location of the Kolkata teams tents and stadiums

Team	Head coach	Captain	Location
Indian Super League teams
East Bengal	(Spain) Oscar Bruzon	(India) Naorem Mahesh Singh	Kolkata, West Bengal
Jamshedpur	(India) Khalid Jamil	(India) Pronoy Halder	Jamshedpur, Jharkhand
Mohammedan	(India) Mehrajuddin Wadoo	(India) Pukhrambam Dinesh Meitei	Kolkata, West Bengal
Mohun Bagan	(Spain) José Francisco Molina	(India) Vishal Kaith	Kolkata, West Bengal
NorthEast United	(Spain) Juan Pedro Benali	(Spain) Míchel Zabaco	Guwahati, Assam
Punjab	(Greece) Panagiotis Dilmperis	(India) Nikhil Prabhu	Mohali, Punjab
I-League teams
Shillong Lajong	(India) Birendra Thapa	(India) Kenstar Kharshong	Shillong, Meghalaya
Namdhari	(India) Harpreet Singh	(Ghana) Lamine Moro	Ludhiana, Punjab
Real Kashmir	(India) Ishfaq Ahmed	(India) Shahid Nazir	Srinagar, Jammu and Kashmir
Diamond Harbour	(Spain) Kibu Vicuna	(India) Jobby Justin	Diamond Harbour, West Bengal
I-League 2 teams
NEROCA	(India) Gyan Moyon	(India) Angom Kinesh Singh	Imphal, Manipur
Morning Star	(India) CA Laldinsang Pudaite	(India) Komalson Rongphar	Diphu, Assam
State league teams
1 Ladakh	(India) Rajan Mani	(India) Karthik Govindswamy	Leh, Ladakh
Rangdajied United	(India) Aiborlang Khongjee	(India) Balamlynti Khongjee	Shillong, Meghalaya
TRAU	(India) Thangjam Saran Singh	(India) Shitaljit Atom	Imphal, Manipur
Bodoland	(India) Vikash Panthi	(India) Didwm Hazowary	Kokrajhar (BTR), Assam
South United	(India) Kaja Bhadussa	(India) Noel S.	Bengaluru, Karnataka
Indian Armed Forces teams
Indian Air Force	(India) Priya Darshan	(India) Shibinraj Kunniyil	New Delhi, Delhi
Indian Army	(India) Manish Wahi	(India) Sunil B.	New Delhi, Delhi
Indian Navy	(India) Raman Rai	(India) Bhaskar Roy	Kochi, Kerala
ITB Police	(India) Surojit Kumar Prodhani	(India) Subhendu Mandi	Baddowal, Punjab
Border Security Force	(India) Gurjit Singh Atwal	(India) Md. Aasif	Jalandhar, Punjab
Guest invitees/Foreign armed forces teams
(Malaysia) Armed Forces	(Malaysia) Mohd Khairil Hafiz Zanggi	(Malaysia) Affiq Asri	Kuala Lumpur, Malaysia
(Nepal) Tribhuvan Army	(Nepal) Meghraj KC	(Nepal) George Prince Karki	Kathmandu, Nepal

== Venues ==
Kolkata		Jamshedpur
Vivekananda Yuba Bharati Krirangan	Kishore Bharati Krirangan	JRD Tata Sports Complex
Capacity: 68,000	Capacity: 12,000	Capacity: 24,424
Shillong	Kokrajhar	Imphal
Jawaharlal Nehru Stadium	SAI Stadium	Khuman Lampak Main Stadium
Capacity: 17,500	Capacity: 10,000	Capacity: 35,285

== Group stage ==
=== Group A ===
Pos	Team	Pld	W	D	L	GF	GA	GD	Pts	Qualification	EAB	NAM	IAF	SOU
1	East Bengal (H)	3	3	0	0	12	1	+11	9	knockout stage		1–0	6–1	5–0
2	Namdhari	3	2	0	1	6	3	+3	6				4–2	2–0
3	Indian Air Force	3	0	1	2	5	12	−7	1					3–3
4	South United	3	0	1	2	3	10	−7	1					

Source: DFTS
Legend: Blue = home team win; Yellow = draw; Red = away team win.
Rules for classification: Group stage tiebreakers
(H) Hosts

=== Group B ===
Pos	Team	Pld	W	D	L	GF	GA	GD	Pts	Qualification	MBG	DIH	MSC	BSF
1	Mohun Bagan (H)	3	3	0	0	12	2	+10	9	knockout stage		5–1	3–1	4–0
2	Diamond Harbour	3	2	0	1	11	7	+4	6	knockout stage			2–1	8–1
3	Mohammedan (H)	3	1	0	2	5	5	0	3					3–0
4	Border Security Force	3	0	0	3	1	15	−14	0					

Source: DFTS
Legend: Blue = home team win; Yellow = draw; Red = away team win.
Rules for classification: Group stage tiebreakers
(H) Hosts

=== Group C ===
Pos	Team	Pld	W	D	L	GF	GA	GD	Pts	Qualification	JAM	ARM	(Nepal) TRA	LAD
1	Jamshedpur (H)	3	3	0	0	6	2	+4	9	knockout stage		1–0	3–2	2–0
2	Indian Army	3	2	0	1	5	3	+2	6				1–0	4–2
3	(Nepal) Tribhuvan Army	3	0	1	2	3	5	−2	1					1–1
4	1 Ladakh	3	0	1	2	3	7	−4	1					

Source: DFTS
Legend: Blue = home team win; Yellow = draw; Red = away team win.
Rules for classification: Group stage tiebreakers
(H) Hosts

=== Group D ===
Pos	Team	Pld	W	D	L	GF	GA	GD	Pts	Qualification	BDO	PUN	ITB	KMS
1	Bodoland (H)	3	3	0	0	7	1	+6	9	knockout stage		1–0	4–0	2–1
2	Punjab	3	1	1	1	2	2	0	4				0–0	2–1
3	ITB Police	3	1	1	1	2	5	−3	4					2–1
4	Karbi Anglong Morning Star	3	0	0	3	3	6	−3	0					

Source: DFTS
Legend: Blue = home team win; Yellow = draw; Red = away team win.
Rules for classification: Group stage tiebreakers
(H) Hosts

=== Group E ===
Pos	Team	Pld	W	D	L	GF	GA	GD	Pts	Qualification	NEU	SHI	(Malaysia) MAS	RDU
1	NorthEast United	3	2	1	0	7	4	+3	7	knockout stage		2–1	3–1	2–2
2	Shillong Lajong (H)	3	2	0	1	10	3	+7	6	knockout stage			6–0	3–1
3	(Malaysia) Armed Forces	3	1	0	2	2	9	−7	3					1–0
4	Rangdajied United (H)	3	0	1	2	3	6	−3	1					

Source: DFTS
Legend: Blue = home team win; Yellow = draw; Red = away team win.
Rules for classification: Group stage tiebreakers
(H) Hosts

=== Group F ===
Pos	Team	Pld	W	D	L	GF	GA	GD	Pts	Qualification	NVY	RKS	NER	TRA
1	Indian Navy	3	2	1	0	4	2	+2	7	knockout stage		2–1	0–0	2–1
2	Real Kashmir	3	2	0	1	6	4	+2	6				3–1	2–1
3	NEROCA (H)	3	0	2	1	2	4	−2	2					1–1
4	TRAU (H)	3	0	1	2	3	5	−2	1					

Source: DFTS
Legend: Blue = home team win; Yellow = draw; Red = away team win.
Rules for classification: Group stage tiebreakers
(H) Hosts

=== Ranking of second-placed teams ===
Pos	Grp	Team	Pld	W	D	L	GF	GA	GD	Pts	Qualification
1	E	Shillong Lajong	3	2	0	1	10	3	+7	6	knockout stage
2	B	Diamond Harbour	3	2	0	1	11	7	+4	6	knockout stage
3	A	Namdhari	3	2	0	1	6	3	+3	6	
4	F	Real Kashmir	3	2	0	1	6	4	+2	6	
5	C	Indian Army	3	2	0	1	5	3	+2	6	
6	D	Punjab	3	1	1	1	2	2	0	4	

Source: DFTS

== Knockout stage ==
In the knockout stage, any draw matches would be directly decided by a penalty shootout.

Bracket

Quarter-finals
16 Aug – Shillong
Shillong Lajong	2
Indian Navy	1
16 Aug – Kokrajhar
Bodoland	0
NorthEast United	4
17 Aug – Jamshedpur
Jamshedpur	0
Diamond Harbour	2
17 Aug – Kolkata
East Bengal	2
Mohun Bagan	1

Semi-finals
19 Aug – Shillong
Shillong Lajong	0
NorthEast United	1
20 Aug – Kolkata
Diamond Harbour	2
East Bengal	1

Final
23 Aug – Kolkata
NorthEast United	6
Diamond Harbour	1

=== Quarter-finals ===
16 August 2025
16:00 IST
Match 37

Shillong Lajong	2–1	Indian Navy
Lyngdoh 69' (pen.); Everbrightson 80'	Report; PDF Report	Vijay Marandi 38'

Jawaharlal Nehru Stadium, Shillong, Meghalaya
Attendance: 8,337
Referee: Pratik Mondal
Man of the Match: Everbrightson Mylliempdah (Shillong Lajong)

16 August 2025
19:00 IST
Match 38

Bodoland	0–4	NorthEast United
	Report; PDF Report	Ajaraie 29', 61'; Andy 53'; Parthib 90+1'

SAI Stadium, Kokrajhar (BTR), Assam
Attendance: 14,970
Referee: Surajit Das
Man of the Match: Alaaeddine Ajaraie (NorthEast United)

17 August 2025
16:00 IST
Match 39

Jamshedpur	0–2	Diamond Harbour
	Report; PDF Report	Sairuat Kima 3', 41'

JRD Tata Sports Complex, Jamshedpur, Jharkhand
Attendance: 11,472
Referee: Lakshay
Man of the Match: Sairuat Kima (Diamond Harbour)

17 August 2025
19:00 IST
Match 40

East Bengal	2–1	Mohun Bagan
Diamantakos 38' (pen.), 52'	Report; PDF Report	Thapa 68'

Vivekananda Yuba Bharati Krirangan, Kolkata, West Bengal
Attendance: 58,676
Referee: Venkatesh Ramachandran
Man of the Match: Dimitrios Diamantakos (East Bengal)

=== Semi-finals ===
19 August 2025
19:00 IST
Match 41

Shillong Lajong	0–1	NorthEast United
	Report; PDF Report	Tlang 36'

Jawaharlal Nehru Stadium, Shillong, Meghalaya
Attendance: 14,911
Referee: Senthil Nathan (sub. Lalit Singh Rawat)
Man of the Match: Redeem Tlang (NorthEast United)

20 August 2025
19:00 IST
Match 42

Diamond Harbour	2–1	East Bengal
Kortazar 66'; Justin 83'	Report; PDF Report	Anwar 67'

Vivekananda Yuba Bharati Krirangan, Kolkata, West Bengal
Attendance: 18,960
Referee: Harish Kundu
Man of the Match: Mirshad Michu (Diamond Harbour)

=== Final ===
23 August 2025
17:30 IST

NorthEast United	6–1	Diamond Harbour
Akhtar 30'; Gogoi 45+1'; Ngasepam 50'; Samperio 81'; Rodríguez 85'; Ajaraie 90+3' (pen.)	Report; PDF	Majcen 68'

Vivekananda Yuba Bharati Krirangan, Kolkata, West Bengal
Attendance: 16,920

== Statistics ==
=== Top scorers ===
As of 17 August 2025

Rank	Player	Team	Goals
1	(Morocco) Alaaeddine Ajaraie	NorthEast United	8
2	(India) Liston Colaco	Mohun Bagan	5
2	(Slovenia) Luka Majcen	Diamond Harbour	5
4	(Brazil) Clayton Silva	Diamond Harbour	4
4	(India) Everbrightson Sana	Shillong Lajong	4
6	(India) Makakmayum Daniyal	South United	3
6	(Greece) Dimitrios Diamantakos	East Bengal	3
6	(India) Sairuat Kima	Diamond Harbour	3
9	(India) Phrangki Buam	Shillong Lajong	2
9	(India) Anirudh Thapa	Mohun Bagan	2
9	(Brazil) Dé	Namdhari	2
9	(Morocco) Hamid Ahadad	East Bengal	2
9	(Nigeria) Joseph Olaleye	KAMS	2
9	(India) Sankit Singh	Indian Air Force	2
9	(India) Sahal Abdul Samad	Mohun Bagan	2
9	(Colombia) Robinson Blandón	Bodoland	2
9	(Spain) Saúl Crespo	East Bengal	2
9	(India) Bipin Singh	East Bengal	2
9	(India) P Christopher Kamei	Indian Army	2
9	(India) Maharabam Maxion	Mohammedan	2
9	(Russia) Marat Tareck	Real Kashmir	2

=== Hat-tricks ===
Player	For	Against	Result	Date	Ref
(India) Makakmayum Daniyal	South United	Indian Air Force	3–3	27 July 2025	
(Brazil) Clayton Silva (4)	Diamond Harbour	BSF FT	8–1	1 August 2025	
(Morocco) Alaaeddine Ajaraie	NorthEast United	(Malaysia) Armed Forces	3–1	2 August 2025	

=== Top assists ===
As of 12 August 2025

Rank	Player	Team	Assists
1	(India) Sahal Abdul Samad	Mohun Bagan	4
2	(India) Girik Khosla	Diamond Harbour	3
2	(India) Samuel Lalmuanpuia	Diamond Habour	3
2	(India) Vincy Barretto	Jamshedpur	3
5	(Brazil) Miguel Figueira	East Bengal	2
5	(India) Tangva Ragui	Mohammedan	2
5	(India) Lalthankima	Mohammedan	2
5	(India) Roshan Panna	Indian Navy	2
5	(India) Yumnam Monis Singh	TRAU	2
5	(India) Treimiki Lamurong	Shillong Lajong	2
5	(Senegal) Seila Troure	Real Kashmir	2
5	(India) Joby Justin	Diamond Harbour	2
5	(India) N Rohen Singh	Real Kashmir	2
5	(Brazil) Clayton Silva	Diamond Harbour	2

=== Clean sheets ===
As of 8 August 2025

Rank	Player	Team	Clean sheets
1	(India) Amrit Gope	Jamshedpur	2
2	(India) Debjit Majumder	East Bengal	1
2	(India) Prabhsukhan Singh Gill	East Bengal	1
2	(India) Ravi Kumar	Punjab	1
2	(India) Siwel Rymbai	Shillong Lajong	1
2	(India) Gagandeep Singh	Army Red	1
2	(India) Niraj Kumar	Namdhari	1
2	(India) Jetli Sorokhaibam	NEROCA	1
2	(Malaysia) Mohammad Azarulhisham	(Malaysia) Armed Forces	1
2	(India) Bhaskar Roy	Indian Navy	1
2	(India) Vishal Kaith	Mohun Bagan	1
2	(Nepal) Samit Shrestha	(Nepal) Tribhuvan Army	1
2	(India) Subhajit Bhattacharjee	Mohammedan	1

== Awards ==
=== Prize money ===
The total pool of prize money for the 2025 edition is ₹3 crore (US$310,000)

Prize	Recipient	Amount
Champions	NorthEast United	₹1.21 crore (US$130,000)
Runner-up	Diamond Harbour	₹60 lakh (US$62,000)
Golden glove	(India) Gurmeet Singh (NorthEast United)	₹3 lakh (US$3,100)
Golden boot	(Morocco) Alaaeddine Ajaraie (NorthEast United)	₹3 lakh (US$3,100) & a Car
Golden ball	(Morocco) Alaaeddine Ajaraie (NorthEast United)	₹3 lakh (US$3,100) & a Car
Quarter-finalists	Bodoland; Indian Navy; Jamshedpur; Mohun Bagan	₹15 lakh (US$16,000)
Semifinalists	East Bengal; Shillong Lajong	₹25 lakh (US$26,000)

=== Man of the match ===
Match	Man of the match		Match	Man of the match		Match	Man of the match	
Match	Player	Team	Match	Player	Team	Match	Player	Team
Match 1	(India) Mahesh Singh	East Bengal	Match 16	(Morocco) Alaaeddine Ajaraie	NorthEast United	Match 31	(India) Ranjan Singh	Real Kashmir
Match 2	(India) Manvir Singh	Jamshedpur	Match 17	(Brazil) Dé	Namdhari	Match 32	(India) Subhajit Basu	Indian Air Force
Match 3	(India) Phrangki Buam	Shillong Lajong	Match 18	(India) Pramveer Singh	Punjab	Match 33	(India) Abhishekh Shankar Powar	Indian Army
Match 4	(India) Hemraj Bhujel	ITBP	Match 19	(India) Rohen Singh	Real Kashmir	Match 34	(India) Manbhakupar Iawphniaw	Rangdajied United
Match 5	(India) Makakmayum Daniyal	South United	Match 20	(India) Liston Colaco	Mohun Bagan	Match 35	(India) Sreyas Gopalan	Indian Navy
Match 6	(India) Sairuat Kima	Diamond Harbour	Match 21	(India) P Christopher Kamei	Indian Army	Match 36	(India) Pranjal Bhumij	Bodoland
Match 7	(India) Mohammed Sanan K	Jamshedpur	Match 22	(Malaysia) Nasir Yasa	(Malaysia) Armed Forces	Match 37	(India) Everbrightson Mylliempdah	Shillong Lajong
Match 8	(India) Gladdy Nelcen Kharbuli	Shillong Lajong	Match 23	(India) Donborlang Nongkynrih	ITBP	Match 38	(Morocco) Alaaeddine Ajaraie	NorthEast United
Match 9	(India) Sapam Nongpoknganba Singh	TRAU	Match 24	(Palestine) Mohammed Rashid	East Bengal	Match 39	(India) Sairuat Kima	Diamond Harbour
Match 10	(India) Sunil Singh	South United	Match 25	(India) Adersh Mattummal	Indian Navy	Match 40	(Greece) Dimitrios Diamantakos	East Bengal
Match 11	(Colombia) Robinson Blandon	Bodoland	Match 26	(India) Maharabam Maxiom	Mohammedan	Match 41	(India) Redeem Tlang	NorthEast United
Match 12	(India) Liston Colaco	Mohun Bagan	Match 27	(India) Praful Kumar	Jamshedpur	Match 42	(India) Mirshad Michu	Diamond Harbour
Match 13	(India) Bhaskar Roy	Indian Navy	Match 28	(Morocco) Alaaeddine Ajaraie	NorthEast United	Match 43	(Morocco) Alaaeddine Ajaraie	NorthEast United
Match 14	(Brazil) Clayton Silva	Diamond Harbour	Match 29	(Colombia) Robinson Blandon	Bodoland			
Match 15	(India) Prajal Tushir	1 Ladakh	Match 30	(India) Liston Colaco	Mohun Bagan			

== Broadcasting ==
Sony Sports Network have acquired the broadcasting rights starting from 2023. The 2025 edition is being live streamed on the network's OTT platform SonyLIV as well as TV channels Sony Ten 2 and Sony Ten 2 HD.

== See also ==
- Men
  - 2025–26 ISL
  - 2025–26 I-League
  - 2025–26 I-League 2
  - 2025–26 I-League 3
  - 2025–26 Indian State Leagues
  - 2025 Kalinga Super Cup (April)
  - 2025 Super Cup (October)
  - 2026 RFD League
- Women
  - 2025–26 IWL
  - 2025–26 IWL 2
