= 2025 Indian Super Cup final =

2025 Indian Super Cup final refers to multiple football tournament finals in India held in the same year due to scheduling issues:

- 2025 Indian Super Cup final (April)
- 2025 Indian Super Cup final (October)
