= Mikel Kortazar =

Spanish football player

Personal information
- Full name: Mikel Kortazar Idiákez
- Date of birth: 10 March 1999 (age 27)
- Place of birth: Ondarroa, Spain
- Height: 1.87 m (6 ft 2 in)
- Positions: Center-back; left-back

Team information
- Current team: Gokulam Kerala

Youth career
- Athletic Bilbao
- 2015–2016: Athletic Bilbao U18
- 2016–2017: Athletic Bilbao U19

Senior career*
Years	Team	Apps	(Gls)
2017–2020	Basconia	1	(0)
2018–2019	→ Santutxu (loan)	?	(?)
2020–2022	Bilbao Athletic	49	(0)
2022–2023	Logroñés	14	(0)
2023	Calahorra	18	(0)
2023–2024	Tarazona	31	(0)
2024–2025	Amorebieta	32	(1)
2025–2026	Diamond Harbour	18	(1)
2026–	Gokulam Kerala	0	(0)
- * Club domestic league appearances and goals as of 16:30, 14 February 2026 (UTC)

Mikel Kortazar Idiákez (born 10 March 1999) is a Spanish professional footballer who plays as a centre-back or left-back for Indian Football League club Gokulam Kerala.

== Career ==
=== 2025–2026 - Diamond Harbour FC ===
On 23 July 2025, Kortazar was signed by Indian Football League club Diamond Harbour. He was an integral part of the club, as he helped them to be the runner-ups of the 2025 Durand Cup, and helped the club win the 2025–26 Indian Football League season, and thus earning the club a promotion to Indian Super League.

=== 2026–present - Gokulam Kerala FC ===
On 30 August 2026, Indian Football League club Gokulam Kerala completed the signing of Kortazar on a multi-year deal.
