= Sunday Afolabi (footballer) =

Nigerian footballer (born 1999)

Personal information
- Full name: Sunday Kolawole Afolabi
- Date of birth: 10 July 1999 (age 27)
- Place of birth: Abuja, Nigeria
- Height: 1.88 m (6 ft 2 in)
- Position: Defensive midfielder

Team information
- Current team: Diamond Harbour
- Number: 2

Senior career*
Years	Team	Apps	(Gls)
2017	Osun United		
2018	Rivers United		
2019	Universidad de San Martín	26	(2)
2021	União de Leiria	6	(0)
2021	Púchov	6	(0)
2022–2025	Perak		
2025–	Diamond Harbour		
- * Club domestic league appearances and goals

Sunday Kolawole Afolabi (born 10 July 1999) is a Nigerian professional footballer who plays as a defensive midfielder for Diamond Harbour.

== Career ==
Before the 2017 season, Afolabi signed for Nigerian second tier side Osun United. Before the 2018 season, he signed for Rivers United in the Nigerian top flight. Before the 2019 season, Afolabi signed for Peruvian club San Martín, where he made 26 league appearances and scored 2 goals. On 16 February 2019, he debuted for San Martín during a 1–1 draw with UTC. On 24 March 2019, Afolabi scored his first goal for San Martín during a 1–0 win over Mannucci.

Before the second half of 2020–21, he signed for Leiria in Portugal. In 2021, Afolabi signed for Slovak second tier team Púchov. Before the second half of 2021–22, he signed for Žižkov B in the Czech fifth tier.

== Honours ==
Individual

- Fallon d'Floor': 2022
