= Karthik Govindswamy =

Indian footballer (born 1993)

Personal information
- Full name: Karthik Govindswamy
- Date of birth: 3 November 1993 (age 33)
- Place of birth: Karnataka, India
- Position: Midfielder

Team information
- Current team: ARA
- Number: 7

Youth career
- Pune

Senior career*
Years	Team	Apps	(Gls)
2013	Hindustan Eagles		
- Viva Chennai
2016–2017	Ozone		
2017–2018	Churchill Brothers	2	(0)
2018–2019	Chennai City	6	(0)
2020–2022	ARA	7	(0)
2022-	FC Bengaluru United		(8)
- * Club domestic league appearances and goals as of 05:35, 18 July 2020 (UTC)

Karthik Govindswamy (born 3 November 1993) is an Indian professional footballer who plays as a midfielder for I-League 2nd Division side ARA.

== Club career ==
Born in Karnataka, Govindswamy began his career in the youth squad of I-League side Pune. After failing to make a professional appearance for the club, Govindswamy left Pune in 2013 to join CFA Senior Division League side Hindustan Eagles. Govindswamy would eventually join another local Chennai based side, Viva Chennai, before signing with Ozone in Bangalore in 2016. While with Ozone, Govindswamy participated in both the local Bangalore Super Division and I-League 2nd Division. He was also selected to be part of the Karnataka side which participated in the Santosh Trophy.

After spending some time with Ozone, Govindswamy signed with I-League side Churchill Brothers. He made his professional debut for the club on 2 December 2017 against Shillong Lajong. He started and played 55 minutes as Churchill Brothers were defeated 2–0. He stayed with the club for one season before joining Chennai City for the 2018–19 season. He made his debut for the club on 26 October 2018 against Indian Arrows, coming on as a 90th-minute substitute as Chennai City won 4–1. He ended the season having played six matches for Chennai City as the club won the I-League title.

The next season, in January 2020, Govindswamy signed with I-League 2nd Division club ARA. He made his debut for the club on 25 January 2020 against Mumbai City Reserves. He started and played the whole match as ARA won 5–0.

== Career statistics ==
=== Club ===
As of match played 6 March 2020

Appearances and goals by club, season and competition
Club	Season	League			Cup		Continental		Total	
Club	Season	Division	Apps	Goals	Apps	Goals	Apps	Goals	Apps	Goals
Churchill Brothers	2017–18	I-League	2	0	—	—	—	—	2	0
Chennai City	2018–19	I-League	6	0	—	—	—	—	6	0
ARA	2019–20	I-League 2nd Division	7	0	—	—	—	—	7	0
Career total			15	0	0	0	0	0	15	0

== Honours ==
Chennai City

- I-League: 2018–19
