= Ladakh FC =

Indian association football club based in Leh

- Full name: One Ladakh Football Club
- Short name: 1 Ladakh
- Founded: 4 April 2023; 3 years ago
- Ground: Astro Turf Football Stadium
- Capacity: 15,000
- Owner: Tshering Angmo
- Head coach: Rajan Mani
- Website: www.ladakhfc.com
| Home colours | Away colours |

Ladakh Football Club, also known as 1 Ladakh FC, is an Indian professional football club based in Leh, Ladakh. The club last competed in Ladakh Super League, one of the Indian State Leagues & also national youth leagues. It is the first professional club from the state of Ladakh. The principal of the club is to play for awareness on climate change. They play home matches at the 11,000 feet Astro Turf Football Stadium. The club organises Ladakh Climate Cup, a preseason competition with participants from different parts of India.

== Crest ==
The crest consists of a black-necked crane, a bird found in Ladakh. The primary colour of the club is orange. 1 Ladakh FC launched their first ever home kit on 6 July 2023, on the birthday occasion of the Tibetan spiritual leader Dalai Lama.

== See also ==
- List of football clubs in India
- Ladakh Football Association
