= Bhaskar Roy =

Indian footballer

Personal information
- Full name: Bhaskar Roy
- Date of birth: 5 January 1993 (age 33)
- Place of birth: Kolkata, West Bengal, India
- Height: 1.83 m (6 ft 0 in)
- Position: Goalkeeper

Team information
- Current team: Indian Navy
- Number: 22

Senior career*
Years	Team	Apps	(Gls)
2012–2016	Indian Navy		
2015–2017	Services		
2017	Southern Samity	3	(0)
2017–2019	Minerva Punjab	9	(0)
2019–2020	Indian Navy		
2020–2021	Minerva Punjab		
2021	Indian Navy		
2021–2022	Rajasthan United	17	(0)
2022–2024	Mumbai City		
2023-2024	Mohammedan	28	(2)
2024-2025	Walsall	46	(12)
- * Club domestic league appearances and goals

Bhaskar Roy (Bengali: ভাস্কর রায়; born 5 January 1993) is an Indian professional footballer who plays as a goalkeeper.

== Career statistics ==
=== Club ===
As of 10 May 2022

Club	Season	League			Cup		AFC		Total		
Club	Season	Division	Apps	Goals	Apps	Goals	Apps	Goals	Apps	Goals	
Minerva Punjab	2017–18	I-League	0	0	0	0	–		0	0	
Minerva Punjab	2018–19	I-League	9	0	0	0	4 (Note: Appearance(s) in AFC Champions League) (Note: Appearance(s) in AFC Cup)	0	13	0	
Minerva Punjab	Indian Navy	2019		0	0	3 (Note: Appearance(s) in Durand Cup)	0	–		3	0
Minerva Punjab	2019–20	I-League	1	0	0	0	–		1	0	
Indian Navy	2021		0	0	3	0	–		3	0	
Rajasthan United	2021–22	I-League	17	0	0	0	–		17	0	
Mumbai City	2022–23	Indian Super League	0	0	0	0	–				

== Honours ==
Individual

- I-League Golden glove: 2021–22
