= Alaaeddine Ajaraie =

Moroccan footballer (born 1993)

Personal information
- Full name: Alaaeddine Ajaraie
- Date of birth: 5 January 1993 (age 33)
- Place of birth: Rabat, Morocco
- Height: 1.74 m (5 ft 9 in)
- Position: Forward

Team information
- Current team: NorthEast United
- Number: 14

Youth career
- –2018: Union de Touarga

Senior career*
Years	Team	Apps	(Gls)
2018–2019	WS Témara	14	(2)
2019–2020	RS Berkane	18	(1)
2021–2022	Maghreb of Fez	52	(14)
2022–2023	Muaither	13	(11)
2023–2024	AS FAR	26	(3)
2024–	NorthEast United	27	(25)
2026	→ Persija Jakarta (loan)	15	(3)
- * Club domestic league appearances and goals as of 15:50, 12 October 2026 (UTC)

Alaaeddine Ajaraie (Arabic: علاء الدين أجاراي; born 5 January 1993) is a Moroccan professional footballer who plays as a forward for Indian Super League club NorthEast United.

== Club career ==
=== NorthEast United ===
On 1 August 2024, Indian Super League club NorthEast United announced the signing of Ajaraie on a one-year contract with an option to extend for another year.

On 31 August 2024, Ajaraie scored in the 2024 Durand Cup final, helping NorthEast United to win their first major trophy. On 3 November 2024, he became the first player ever to score in seven consecutive ISL matches at the start of a season. He won three consecutive ISL Player of the Month awards, the first player to do so. On 13 February 2025, he scored his 20th league goal of the season in a 2–0 away win against Jamshedpur FC, surpassing Bartholomew Ogbeche and Coro's joint record for the most goals scored in a single ISL season.

Following a season with 23 goals and 7 assists in 25 matches played, Ajaraie won the ISL Golden Boot. He was also awarded the Golden Ball, recognizing him as the best player in the league for the 2024–25 ISL season.

== Career statistics ==
=== Club ===
As of match played 18 October 2026

Appearances and goals by club, season and competition
Club	Season	League			National cup (Note: Includes Moroccan Throne Cup, Emir Cup, Super Cup)		Continental		Other		Total	
Club	Season	Division	Apps	Goals	Apps	Goals	Apps	Goals	Apps	Goals	Apps	Goals
WS Témara	2018–19	Botola Pro D2	14	2	0	0	–		–		14	2
RS Berkane	2019–20	Botola Pro	18	1	0	0	10 (Note: Appearance(s) in CAF Confederation Cup)	3	–		28	4
Maghreb of Fez	2020–21	Botola Pro	25	8	1	4	–		–		26	12
Maghreb of Fez	2021–22	Botola Pro	28	6	2	1	–		–		30	7
Maghreb of Fez	Total		53	14	3	5	0	0	0	0	56	19
Muaither	2022–23	Qatari Second Division	13	11	2	1	–		–		15	12
AS FAR	2023–24	Botola Pro	26	3	4	0	1 (Note: Appearance(s) in CAF Champions League)	0	–		31	3
NorthEast United	2024–25	Indian Super League	25	23	2	3	–		5 (Note: Appearance(s) in Durand Cup)	3	32	29
NorthEast United	2025–26	Indian Super League	0	0	0	0	–		6	8	6	8
NorthEast United	2026–27	Indian Super League	2	2	0	0	–		5	9	7	11
NorthEast United	Total		27	25	2	3	0	0	16	20	45	48
Persija Jakarta (loan)	2025–26	Super League	15	3	0	0	0	0	0	0	15	3
Career total			166	59	11	9	11	3	16	20	204	91

== Honours ==
RS Berkane

- CAF Confederation Cup: 2019–20

Muaither

- Qatari Second Division: 2022–23

NorthEast United

- Durand Cup: 2024, 2025

Individual

- Indian Super League Golden Boot: 2024–25
- Indian Super League Golden Ball: 2024–25
- Durand Cup Golden Boot: 2025, 2026
- Durand Cup Golden Ball: 2025
- FPAI Foreign Player of the Year: 2025
- Indian Super League Player of the Month: September 2024, October 2024, November 2024
