= Andy Rodríguez =

Spanish footballer

Personal information
- Full name: José Andrés Rodríguez Gaitán
- Date of birth: 30 January 1990 (age 36)
- Place of birth: Almuñécar, Spain
- Height: 1.85 m (6 ft 1 in)
- Position: Midfielder

Youth career
- 1996–2006: AD Almuñécar 77
- 2006–2009: Real Madrid

Senior career*
| Years | Team | Apps | (Gls) |
| 2009–2012 | Real Madrid B | 95 | (13) |
| 2012–2014 | Levante | 74 | (20) |
| 2014–2018 | Ponferradina | 130 | (16) |
| 2018–2021 | Logroñés | 107 | (22) |
| 2021–2024 | Burgos | 56 | (1) |
| 2024–2025 | Cartagena | 57 | (6) |
| 2025–2026 | NorthEast United | 13 | (3) |
- * Club domestic league appearances and goals as of 16:46, 2 May 2026 (UTC)

José Andrés Rodríguez Gaitán, commonly known as Andy Rodríguez (born 30 January 1990), is a Spanish professional footballer who plays as a midfielder.

== Club career ==
Born in Almuñécar, Granada, Andalusia, Andy finished his graduation at Real Madrid's youth setup, and started playing as a senior with the C-team in the 2009–10 campaign, in Tercera División. On 5 August 2012 he moved to Levante UD, being assigned to the reserves in Segunda División B.

On 8 July 2014, after scoring a career-best 11 goals, Andy signed a one-year deal with Segunda División's SD Ponferradina. He played his first match as a professional on 24 August, starting in a 1–0 home win against CD Tenerife.

Andy scored his first professional goal on 13 September 2014, netting his side's second in a 3–1 away win against CD Numancia. He ended the season with six goals, being an ever-present figure as his side finished one point shy of the play-offs.

On 3 July 2018, free agent Andy signed for UD Logroñés in division three, and helped in their first-ever promotion to the second division in 2020. On 3 July 2021, after the club's relegation, he moved to Burgos CF also in the second tier.

On 3 January 2024, Andy left the Burgaleses on a mutual agreement, and signed a short-term deal with fellow second division team FC Cartagena just hours later.

== Personal life ==
Andy's younger brother Fran is also a footballer. A right back, he too was trained at Real Madrid.

== Honours ==
NorthEast United

- Durand Cup: 2025
