= JRD Tata Sports Complex =

Stadium in Jamshedpur, India

Coordinates: 22°48′21.68″N 86°11′36.73″E

JRD Tata Sports Complex Stadium
- The Furnace
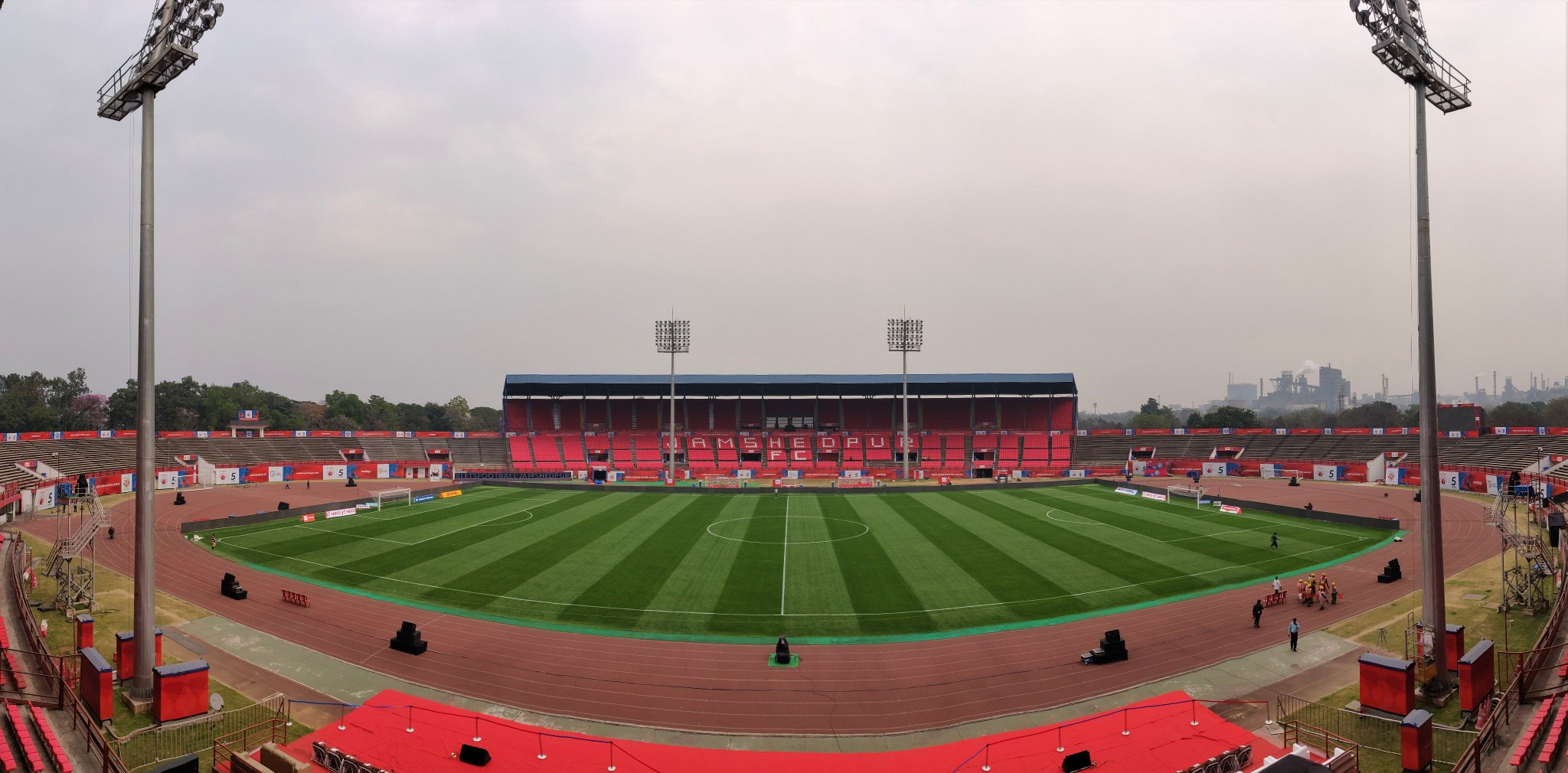
- Panoramic view of the stadium
- Interactive map of JRD Tata Sports Complex Stadium
- Full name: Jehangir Ratanji Dadabhoy Tata Sports Complex
- Location: Jamshedpur, Jharkhand
- Owner: Tata Steel
- Operator: Jamshedpur FC
- Capacity: 24,424 (for ISL games)
- Surface: Bermuda Grass
- Field size: 105 m × 68 m (344 ft × 223 ft)

Construction
- Opened: 1991
- Renovated: 2017
- Cost: INR ₹ 400 Million (renovation cost)

Tenants
- Jamshedpur FC; Jamshedpur Reserves; Jamshedpur Youths; India football team (selected matches); Jharkhand football team Jharkhand women's football team JSA League

The JRD Tata Sports Complex Stadium, also known as The Furnace, is a 40,000-capacity (often limited to 24,424) stadium in Jamshedpur, India. It is used mostly for association football matches and athletics competitions. It has been the home stadium of Jamshedpur FC since the 2017–18 season. The stadium holds 24,424–40,000 spectators for sports matches (depending on the event).

== History ==
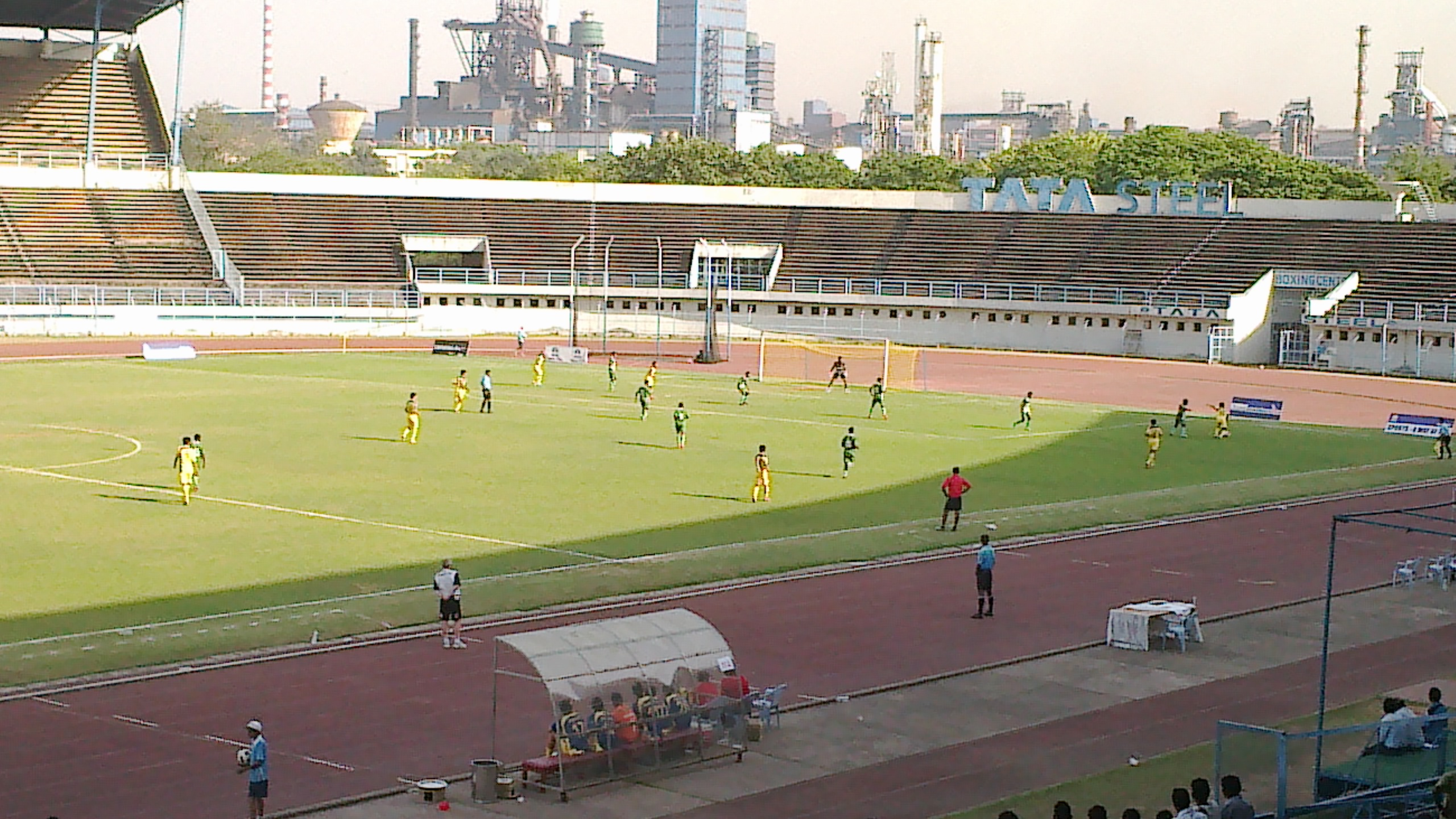
JRD Tata Sports Complex before renovation, in 2013.

The JRD Tata Sports Complex is the largest sports arena in Jamshedpur. The sports complex is also used for conducting the annual sports day events of many reputed schools in Jamshedpur.

On 5 January 2007, the stadium was also a venue of having prominent performers, such as, Shankar Mahadevan, Ehsaan Noorani, Loy Mendonsa, and Mahalaxmi Iyer, performed to mark the final day of Tata Steel's four-day celebration of its centenary year, event known as 'Shatrang'.

Apart from that a significant exhibition football match was played between São Paulo FC from Brazil and Mohammedan SC from India in 2007.

Currently, it is the home ground for Indian Super League club Jamshedpur FC. This stadium also holds the record of 2nd highest average home attendance for Jamshedpur FC in the 2017–18 season of the Indian Super League. It holds the record for 1st highest average home attendance for Jamshedpur FC in 2018–19 ISL season. It holds the record of 2nd highest average home attendance for Jamshedpur FC in 2019–20 ISL season and also holds the record of 3rd highest average home attendance for Jamshedpur FC in 2022–23 ISL season.

== Facilities ==
As a multi-use stadium, it provides athletes facilities to board, train and compete in the same sports arena. The complex has an international size football pitch with an eight-lane mono-synthetic running track around the field.

It is primarily used for football and athletics but it has facilities for various other sports including Archery, Basketball, Field Hockey, Handball, swimming, Table Tennis, Tennis, Volleyball. It has a full service fitness center which is free for resident athletes and is accessible to the citizens of Jamshedpur for a fee. The sports complex is also the headquarters for the Tata Chess Centre and Tata Archery Academy. It also has a world class swimming pool in it complex.

- Archery
- Basketball
- Field Hockey
- Football
- Handball
- Table Tennis
- Tennis
- Track and Field
- Swimming
- Volleyball
- Relay
- Marching
- Kabaddi
- Shooting
- Boxing
- Martial arts
- Chess
- Yoga
- Karate
- Athletics
- Badminton
- Others

== Average attendances ==
Tenants	League season	Home games	Average attendance
Jamshedpur FC	2023–24	11	14,996
Jamshedpur FC	2022–23	10	14,652

== See also ==
- List of football stadiums in India
- Lists of stadiums
