= Bodoland FC =

Indian association football club

Bodoland
- Full name: Bodoland Football Club
- Short name: BFC; BDFC
- Founded: 2022; 4 years ago
- Ground: SAI Stadium, Kokrajhar
- Capacity: 12,000
- Head coach: Vikash Panthi
| Home colours | Away colours | Third colours |

Bodoland Football Club is an Indian professional football club based in Kokrajhar, Bodoland, Assam. It is the first club from Bodoland Territorial Region (BTR) to participate in the Durand Cup.

== History ==
Bodoland FC was established in 2022 to uplift the standard of football in Bodoland Territorial Region (BTR). They won the Inter Sixth Schedule Council Premier Football League tournament (ISPL) in 2022, by defeating Lai Autonomous District Council of Mizoram. In the same year, it also participated in the Baji Rout Cup in Odisha. The club has entered into national football map through its participation in the 2023 Durand Cup.
