= Indian Navy Sports Club =

Football club of Indian Navy

Indian Navy
- Full name: Indian Navy Sports Club
- Nickname: The Sailors
- Short name: INFT; INDNAV
- Ground: Various
- Owner(s): Services Sports Control Board; Indian Navy
- Head coach: Akash Kamble
Home colours	Away colours

Indian Navy Sports Club is best known as football section of the Indian Navy. The INFT used to compete in the MDFA Elite League. It regularly participates in the Durand Cup and as guests on various regional tournaments. It consists of the Indian Navy officials. They also have a cricket section.

== Honours ==
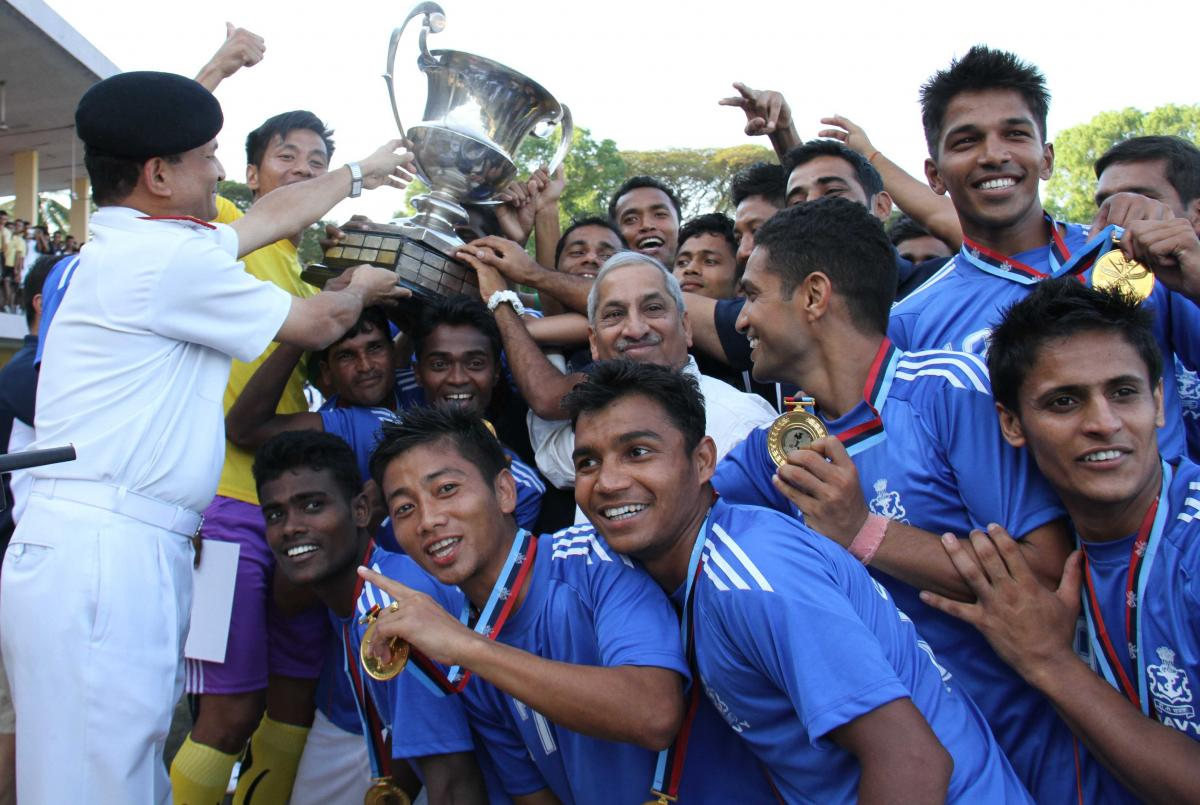
Indian Navy players celebrating with Services Cup trophy in 2013

=== League ===
- Mumbai Football League
  - Champions (2): 1954, 1957
- Kerala Premier League
  - Champions (1): 2018–19

=== Cup ===
- IFA Shield
  - Runners-up (1): 1960
- Nadkarni Cup
  - Champions (1): 1957
  - Runners-up (1): 1962
- Services Cup
  - Champions (1): 2013
- GV Raja all-India football tournament
  - Champions (2): 2015, 2016
  - Runners-up (1): 2017

== See also ==
- Army Red
- Army Green
- Indian Air Force
- Services football team
- Railways football team
- Assam Rifles
- Central Reserve Police Force SC
- CISF Protectors football team
- Indian Army Service Corps
