= Diamond Harbour FC =

Association football club in West Bengal, India

Diamond Harbour
- Full name: Diamond Harbour Football Club
- Nickname: The Harbour Boys
- Short name: DHFC
- Founded: 2020; 6 years ago
- Ground: Naihati Stadium; Kalyani Stadium
- Capacity: 25,000; 20,000
- Owner: Diamond Harbour Sports Pvt. Ltd.
- President: Abhishek Banerjee
- League: Indian Football League
- 2025–26: Indian Football League, 1st of 10 (promoted)
Home colours	Away colours	Third colours

Diamond Harbour Football Club (DHFC) is a professional football club based in Diamond Harbour, West Bengal, India. The club last competed in the Indian Football League, the second tier of the Indian football league system.

The club plays its home matches mostly at the Naihati Stadium, which has a seating capacity of 25,000 spectators. The team's colours are primarily navy blue, red and white, reflecting the maritime heritage of Diamond Harbour.

== History ==
Diamond Harbour Football Club was established in 2020 and approved by the Indian Football Association (IFA) in 2022 to participate in the Calcutta Football League (CFL) First Division, the third tier of the state league structure. Spanish coach Kibu Vicuña, previously associated with Mohun Bagan and Kerala Blasters, was appointed as the club's first head coach.

In 2023, the Indian Football Association introduced a new format by merging the CFL Premier Divisions A and B into a single competition. DHFC was placed in Group I and qualified for the Super Six stage of the tournament. Later in the year, the club was nominated to represent West Bengal in the inaugural season of the I-League 3, the new fourth tier in the Indian league system.

In 2024, Diamond Harbour FC took part in the Sikkim Gold Cup held in Gangtok, reflecting its growing participation in national-level competitions. The club won the I-League 2 and was promoted to the I-League in the same year. Diamond Harbour made their Durand Cup debut in 2025, where they reached the final by beating Indian Super League clubs Jamshedpur FC and East Bengal FC. However, they lost the final 6–1 to NorthEast United FC and finished runners up. Diamond Harbour won the 2025–26 Indian Football League and was promoted to the 2026–27 Indian Super League, until withdrawal due to financial reasons.

== Players ==
=== First team squad ===
As of July 2026

Note: Flags indicate national team as defined under FIFA eligibility rules; some limited exceptions apply. Players may hold more than one non-FIFA nationality.

No.	Pos.	Nation	Player
1	GK	IND	Dheeraj Singh
2	MF	NGR	Sunday Afolabi
6	MF	IND	Mohit Mittal
8	MF	IND	Wahengbam Angousana
11	MF	IND	Bryce Miranda
12	MF	IND	Amzard Khan
14	MF	IND	Paul Ramfangzauva
16	DF	IND	Robilal Mandi
17	FW	IND	Sahil Harijan
21	GK	IND	Susnata Malik

No.	Pos.	Nation	Player
24	GK	IND	Mohammed Arbaz (on loan from Kerala Blasters)
27	MF	IND	Pintu Mahata
28	MF	IND	Akash Hemram
33	DF	IND	Ajith Kumar
37	MF	IND	Samuel Lalmuanpuia
42	FW	NGR	Bright Enobakhare
45	FW	IND	Aimar Adam
55	DF	IND	Nitesh Darjee
60	MF	IND	Girik Khosla
99	FW	SLO	Luka Majcen

== Technical staff ==
As of July 2026

Title	Name
Owner	(India) Abhishek Banerjee
Head coach	
Assistant coach	(India) Dipankur Sharma (India) Abhishek Das
Team manager	(India) Pritam Saha
Goalkeeper coach	(India) Abhishek Das
Performance analyst	(India) Gaurav Mukherjee
Physio	(India) Vikas Kumar
Kitman	(India) Arghya Bhattacharya

== Honours ==
=== Domestic ===
League

- Indian Football League
  - Champions (1): 2025–26
- I-League 2
  - Champions (1): 2024–25
- I-League 3
  - Champions (1): 2024–25
- Calcutta Football League
  - Runners-up (1): 2024–25

Cup

- Durand Cup
  - Runners-up (1): 2025
- Oil India Gold Cup
  - Winners (1): 2025
- Bodousa Cup
  - Winners (1): 2025

== See also ==
- Football in India
- History of Indian football
- Indian football league system
- List of football clubs in Kolkata
- List of football clubs in West Bengal
- State football leagues in India
