= List of NorthEast United FC records and statistics =

NorthEast United FC is an Indian professional football club based in Guwahati, Assam that competes in the Indian Super League, the top flight of Indian football. The club was founded on 13 April 2014 during the inaugural season of Indian Super League. NorthEast United represent the 8 states of India known as North East India which consist Assam, Nagaland, Manipur, Meghalaya, Sikkim, Arunachal Pradesh, Tripura and Mizoram.

== Honours ==
=== Domestic ===
- Durand Cup
  - Winners (2): 2024, 2025
- Sikkim Gold Cup
  - Winners (1): 2024
- Bordoloi Trophy
  - Runners-up (1): 2025

== Team records ==
=== All time performance record ===
As of 21 August 2026

Competition	MP	W	D	L	GF	GA	GD	Pts	Best Performance
Indian Super League	220	59	66	94	265	341	-76	243	League: 3rd (2020–21) Playoffs: Semi-finals (2018–19, 2020–21)
Super Cup	11	5	0	6	25	19	5	15	Semi-finals (2023)
Durand Cup	26	19	2	5	69	29	40	59	Champions (2024, 2025)
Total	257	83	68	105	359	389	-30	317	

=== General ===
Note: When scores are mentioned, score NorthEast United are given first.

==== Indian Super League ====
- First Match: 1–0 (vs Kerala Blasters, 13 October 2014)
- First Win: 1–0 (vs Kerala Blasters, 13 October 2014)
- Biggest win: 5–0 (vs Jamshedpur, 26 October 2024)
- Biggest loss:
  - 0–5 (vs Pune City, 30 December 2017)
  - 0–5 (vs Hyderabad, 31 January 2022)
- Highest scoring draw:
  - 3–3 (vs Jamshedpur ,10 February 2020)
  - 3–3 (vs Chennaiyin ,18 February 2021)
  - 3–3 (vs Mumbai City, 27 December 2021)
- Longest winning run: 3 games, during 2020–21
- Longest unbeaten run: 11 games, during 2020–21
- Longest losing run: 10 games, during 2022–23

Seasonal Records
Stat	Best	Season	Worst	Season
Points	38	2024–25	5	2022–23
Wins	10	2024–25	1	2022–23
Losses	3	2018–19, 2020–21	17	2022–23
Goals scored	46	2024–25	11	2014
Goals conceded	13	2014	55	2022–23
Goal difference	+17	2024–25	-35	2022–23

==== Super Cup ====
- First Win: 2–1 (vs Mumbai City ,15 April 2023)
- Biggest win: 6–0 (vs Mohammedan, 24 April 2025)
- Biggest loss: 1–3 (vs Odisha, 23 April 2023)

==== Durand Cup ====
- First Win: 2–0 (vs Sudeva Delhi, 2 September 2022)
- Biggest win: 6–0 (vs Bodoland, 1 August 2026)
- Biggest loss: 0–6 (vs Odisha, 17 August 2022)

==== Attendance ====
- Highest home attendance:
  - Guwahati: 32,844 (vs Chennaiyin, 20 October 2016)
  - Shillong: 14,849 (vs Jamshedpur, 30th March 2025)
- Lowest home attendance:
  - Guwahati: 361 (vs Goa, 15 January 2023)
  - Shillong: 9,927 (vs East Bengal, 8th March 2025)

Home grounds
Stadium	Location	Seasons
Indira Gandhi Athletic Stadium	Guwahati, Assam	2014–2020, 2022–present
Tilak Maidan	Vasco da Gama, Goa	2020–21 (due to COVID-19)
Fatorda Stadium	Margao, Goa	2021–22 (due to COVID-19)
Jawaharlal Nehru Stadium	Shillong, Meghalaya	2024–2025 (selected matches)
Khuman Lampak Main Stadium	Imphal, Manipur	2026–2027(selected matches)

== Players Records ==
=== Most Appearances ===
==== All competitions ====
As of match played 21 May 2026

Bold denotes players still playing for the club.

Italics denotes players still playing professional football.

Ranking	Name	Nationality	Years	League	Cup	Total	Ref.
1	**Redeem Tlang**	(India)	2018–2020; 2023–present	**81**	18	99	
2	**Jithin MS**	(India)	2022–present	71	**27**	98	
3	**Parthib Gogoi**	(India)	2022–present	70	21	91	
4	**Asheer Akhtar**	(India)	2023–present	53	20	73	
5	Reagan Singh	(India)	2015–2020	68	2	70	
6	**Tondonba Singh**	(India)	2021–present	46	22	68	
7	**Míchel Zabaco**	(Spain)	2023–present	48	19	67	
8	**Dinesh Singh**	(India)	2023–present	45	19	64	
9	**Macarton Nickson**	(India)	2023–present	48	15	63	
10	**Gurmeet Singh**	(India)	2018–2021 2024–present	49	13	62	

- Most appearance in all competitions: **86** – Redeem Tlang
- Most appearances in Indian Super League: **70** – Redeem Tlang
- Most appearances in Super Cup: **9** – Jithin MS
- Most appearances in Durand Cup: **16** – Jithin MS
- Youngest player (also ISL record): Alfred Lalroutsang – 16 years 235 days
- Youngest foreign player: Francis Dadzie – 20 years and 91 days
- Oldest player: Silas – 39 years and 90 days
- Oldest Indian player: Subhasish Roy Chowdhury – 35 years and 136 days

=== Top goalscorers ===
==== All competitions ====
As of match played 21 May 2026

Bold denotes players still playing for the club.

Italics denotes players still playing professional football.

Ranking	Name	Nationality	Years	League	Cup	Total
1	Alaaeddine Ajaraie	(Morocco)	2024–2025	**23**	**14**	37
2	**Parthib Gogoi**	(India)	2022–present	12	8	20
3	**Jithin M. S.**	(India)	2022–present	9	7	16
3	Néstor Albiach	(Spain)	2023–2025	11	5	16
5	Wilmar Jordán	(Colombia)	2023	8	7	15
6	Bartholomew Ogbeche	(Nigeria)	2018–2019	12	0	12
6	Deshorn Brown	(Jamaica)	2021–2022	12	0	12
8	Guillermo Fernández	(Spain)	2024–present	5	6	11
9	Federico Gallego	(Uruguay)	2018–2022	9	0	9
10	Nicolás Vélez	(Argentina)	2015–2016	8	0	8

- All time top scorer: **37** – (Morocco) Alaaeddine Ajaraie
- First goalscorer: (Spain) Koke (vs Kerala Blasters, 13 October 2014)
- First Indian goalscorer: Seiminlen Doungel (vs Chennaiyin, 8 November 2014)
- First Hat trick: Seiminlen Doungel - (vs Chennaiyin on 19 January 2018)
- Fastest hat-trick: **10 minutes** – (Nigeria) Bartholomew Ogbeche (vs Chennaiyin, 18 October 2018)
- Oldest goalscorer: (Portugal) Silas (vs Chennaiyin, 11 November 2015)
- Youngest goalscorer: (India) Parthib Gogoi (vs Mumbai City, 25 November 2022)
- Fastest goal: **46 seconds** – (Morocco) Alaaeddine Ajaraie (vs Mumbai City, 30 December 2024)
- Most goals in a match: **4** – (Colombia) Wilmar Jordán (vs Churchill Brothers, 19 April 2023)

==== Indian Super League ====
- Most goals all times: **23** - (Morocco) Alaaeddine Ajaraie
- Most goals by an Indian: **10** – Parthib Gogoi
- Most goals in a single ISL season (ISL record): **23** – (Morocco) Alaaeddine Ajaraie (2024-25)
- Most goals in a single ISL season by an Indian: **5** – Parthib Gogoi (2023–24)

==== Super Cup ====
- First goalscorer: Rowllin Borges (vs Chennaiyin, 2 April 2019)
- Most goals all times: **7** – (Colombia) Wilmar Jordán
- Most goals in a single Super Cup: **7** – (Colombia) Wilmar Jordán (2023)

==== Durand Cup ====
- First goalscorer: Dipu Mirdha (vs Army Green, 21 August 2022)
- Most goals all times: **11** – (Morocco) Alaaeddine Ajaraie
- Most goals in a single Durand Cup: **8** – (Morocco) Alaaeddine Ajaraie (2025)

==== Club Hat-tricks ====
Player	Total Goals	Opponent	Final score	Venue	Date (Season)	Notes
(India) Seiminlen Doungel	3	Chennaiyin	**3**–1	Indira Gandhi Athletic Stadium, Guwahati	19 January 2018 (2017–18)	
(Nigeria) Bartholomew Ogbeche	3	Chennaiyin	**4**–3	Jawaharlal Nehru Stadium, Chennai	18 October 2018 (2018–19)	
(Jamaica) Deshorn Brown	3	Mumbai City	**3**–3	Fatorda Stadium, Goa	27 December 2021 (2021–22)	
(Colombia) Wilmar Jordán	4	Churchill Brothers	**6**–3	EMS Stadium, Kozhikode	19 April 2023 (2022–23)	
(India) Parthib Gogoi	3	Shillong Lajong	**4**–0	Indira Gandhi Athletic Stadium, Guwahati	4 August 2023 (2023–24)	
(Morocco) Alaaeddine Ajaraie	3	Mohammedan	**6**–0	Kalinga Stadium, Bhubaneswar	24 April 2025 (2024–25)	
(Morocco) Alaaeddine Ajaraie	3	Malaysian Armed Forces	**3**–1	SAI Stadium, Kokrajhar	2 August 2025 (2025–26)	

=== Assists ===
==== Most assists ====
As of 23 August 2025
Bold denotes players still playing for the club.
Italics denotes players still playing professional football.

Rank	Player	Assists
1	(India) **Jithin MS**	17
2	(Morocco) **Alaaeddine Ajaraie**	14
3	(Uruguay) Federico Gallego	12
4	(India) **Parthib Gogoi**	9
5	(Spain) Néstor Albiach	5
5	**(India) Thoi Singh Huidrom**	5

- Most assists in all competitions: **17** – (India) Jithin MS
- First assist: (Spain) Koke (vs Mumbai City, 24 October 2014)
- Most assists in a single ISL season: **6** – Federico Gallego, (2020-21)

=== Clean sheets ===
==== All competitions ====
As of 23 August 2025
Bold denotes players still playing for the club.
Italics denotes players still playing professional football.

Rank	Player	Appearances	Clean Sheets			Total
Rank	Player	Appearances	League	Cup	AFC	Total
1	(India) **Gurmeet Singh**	48	12	7	-	19
2	(India) Rehenesh TP	51	13	0	-	13
3	(India) Mirshad Michu	50	6	2	-	8
3	(India) Subhasish Roy Chowdhury	40	8	0	-	8
4	(India) Pawan Kumar	18	7	0	-	7
5	(India) Subrata Paul	11	4	-	-	4

- Most clean sheets in all competitions: **19** – Gurmeet Singh
- First clean sheet: Alexandros Tzorvas (vs Kerala Blasters FC, 13 October 2014)
- Most clean sheets in a single ISL season : **7** – Gurmeet Singh, (2024-25)

== Players' individual honours and awards while playing with NorthEast United ==
- NorthEast United players that have won the Indian Super League Emerging Player of the League award:
  - (India) Lalengmawia (1) - 2020–21
- NorthEast United players that have won the Indian Super League Player of the League award:
  - (Morocco) Alaaeddine Ajaraie (1) - 2024–25
- NorthEast United players that have won the Indian Super League Golden Boot Award:
  - (Morocco) Alaaeddine Ajaraie (1) - 2024–25
- NorthEast United players that have won the Super Cup Golden Boot award
  - (Colombia) Wilmar Jordan (1) - 2023
- NorthEast United players that have won the Durand Cup Golden Ball award:
  - (India) Jithin MS (1) - 2024
  - (Morocco) Alaaeddine Ajaraie (1) - 2025
- NorthEast United players that have won the Durand Cup Golden Boot award:
  - (Morocco) Alaaeddine Ajaraie (2) - 2025, 2026
- NorthEast United players that have won the Durand Cup Golden Glove award:
  - (India) Gurmeet Singh (2) - 2024, 2025
- NorthEast United players that have won FPAI Foreign Player of the Year award:
  - (Morocco) Alaaeddine Ajaraie (1) - 2025

== Managerial records ==
Note: Interim managers and caretakers have been excluded from the list

As of 24 August 2025

- Most Matches Managed: (Spain) Juan Pedro Benali – 67
- Least Matches Managed: (Brazil) Sérgio Farias – 0
- Most Wins: (Spain) Juan Pedro Benali – 32
- Most Defeats: (Spain) Juan Pedro Benali – 18
- Highest Win Percentage: (Spain) Juan Pedro Benali – 47.76
- Least Win Percentage: (Israel) Marco Balbul – 0.00
- Most Matches as Assistant Manager: (India) Naushad Moosa

=== List of NorthEast United FC managers ===
Name	Nationality	From	To	P	W	D	L	GF	GA	Win%
Ricki Herbert	New Zealand	19 August 2014	20 December 2014	14	3	6	5	11	13	21.43
César Farías	Venezuela	1 July 2015	2 December 2015	14	6	2	6	18	23	42.86
Sérgio Farias	Brazil	16 May 2016	16 July 2016	0	0	0	0	0	0	—
Nelo Vingada	Portugal	16 July 2016	4 December 2016	14	5	3	6	14	14	35.71
João de Deus	Portugal	17 July 2017	2 January 2018	8	2	1	5	4	13	25.00
Avram Grant	Israel	2 January 2018	15 March 2018	10	1	1	8	8	14	10.00
Eelco Schattorie	Netherlands	17 August 2018	11 March 2019	20	8	8	4	24	21	40.00
Robert Jarni	Croatia	5 August 2019	10 February 2020	15	2	7	6	12	21	13.33
Khalid Jamil (interim)	India	10 February 2020	25 February 2020	3	0	1	2	4	9	0.00
Gerard Nus	Spain	25 August 2020	12 January 2021	11	2	6	3	13	15	18.18
Khalid Jamil (interim)	India	12 January 2021	9 March 2021	11	6	4	1	20	13	54.55
Khalid Jamil	India	23 October 2021	29 May 2022	20	3	5	12	25	43	15.00
Marco Balbul	Israel	11 August 2022	7 December 2022	8	0	0	8	4	18	0.00
Vincenzo Alberto Annese	Italy	8 December 2022	1 March 2023	12	1	2	9	16	37	8.33
Juan Pedro Benali	Spain	22 May 2023	Present	67	32	17	18	138	87	47.76

== See also ==
- List of NorthEast United FC seasons
