= List of NorthEast United FC managers =

NorthEast United Football Club is an Indian professional football club based in Guwahati, Assam. The club was established on 13 April 2014 and competes in the Indian Super League, the top division league of Indian football. They play their home matches at the Indira Gandhi Athletic Stadium in Guwahati.

== Managerial history ==
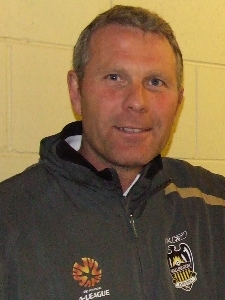
Ricki Herbert is the first manager of the club

The current manager of the club is Juan Pedro Benali.

=== 2014 season ===
On 19 August 2014, former New Zealand international defender, Ricki Herbert was appointed as the first head coach of Highlanders. The Highlanders finished 8th in the league table in their first season.

=== 2015 season ===
After the 2014 season, it was announced that Ricki Herbert would not return to the club as head coach. On 1 July 2015, it was announced that former Venezuela head coach César Farías would take over as the Highlanders head coach. He guided the team to team to 5th in the table for the first time.

=== 2016 season ===
After 2015 season, it was announced that César Farías wouldn't return as the head coach. On 13 May 2016, NorthEast United announced Sérgio Farias as the club's new head coach. However, Sérgio Farias joined his former club Suphanburi FC, during season forcing Highlanders to search for another manager. On 23 July 2016, NorthEast United announced Nelo Vingada as the club's new head coach.

=== 2017–18 season ===
On 17 July 2017, the Highlanders appointed João de Deus as the new head coach for the season. On 2 January 2018, club sacked him due to the poor performance from the team. The team appointed technical advisor Avram Grant as their new caretaker manager.

=== 2018–19 season ===
For 2018–19 season, the highlanders named their assistant coach Eelco Schattorie as the new head coach. He led the team towards 2019 Indian Super League playoffs. They lost to Bengaluru FC in the second leg of semi-finals.

=== 2019–20 season ===
On 5 August 2019, the highlanders announced former Croatian footballer Robert Jarni as their new head coach. After a winless streak of 11 games, Robert Jarni was sacked by the club on 11 February 2021 and Khalid Jamil was appointed as the interim head coach for the season.

=== 2020–21 season ===
On 25 August 2020, the highlanders appointed Gerard Nus as their new head coach. On 13 January 2021, the club sacked Gerrad Nus for not maintaining club's philosophy and vision and installed Khalid Jamil as the interim coach. Under Khalid Jamil the team played their second-ever semifinals and lost to ATK Mohun Bagan in the second leg of playoffs.

=== 2021–22 season ===
On 23 October 2021, NorthEast United appointed Khalid Jamil as their new head coach for the upcoming season.He becomes the first permanent Indian manager in Indian Super League. Under his guidance, NorthEast began its 2021–22 Indian Super League campaign on 20 November with a 4–2 loss to Bengaluru FC. NorthEast United FC had a forgetful 2021-22 season after the highs of the 2020-21 season. They had a sluggish start to the season as injuries and issues off the pitch dictated their on field performances. The ISL’s first ever Indian head coach Khalid Jamil failed to live up to everyone’s expectations as the Highlanders finished 10th on the league standings.

=== 2022–23 season ===
On 11 August 2022, NorthEast United announced the signing of Marco Balbul as their manager for the upcoming season. On 8 December 2022, Vincenzo Alberto Annese joined Indian Super League club NorthEast United as the new head coach after the club sacked Marco Balbul mid-season.

=== 2023-24 season ===
On 22 May 2023, the Club appointed Juan Pedro Benali as the team’s Head Coach on a 1+1 year deal.

== Managers and statistics ==
As of 21 May 2026

Only competitive matches are taken into account.

Table headers

- Nationality – If the manager played international football as a player, the country/countries he played for are shown. Otherwise, the manager's nationality is given as their country of birth.
- From – The year of the manager's first game for NorthEast United.
- To – The year of the manager's last game for NorthEast United.
- M – The number of games managed for NorthEast United.
- W – The number of games won as a manager.
- D – The number of games draw as a manager.
- L – The number of games lost as a manager.
- GF – The number of goals scored under his management.
- GA – The number of goals conceded under his management.
- Win% – The total winning percentage under his management.

List of NorthEast United FC managers
Name	Nationality	From	To	M	W	D	L	GF	GA	Win%	Honours
Ricki Herbert	New Zealand	19 August 2014	20 December 2014	14	3	6	5	11	13	21.43	
César Farías	Venezuela	1 July 2015	2 December 2015	14	6	2	6	18	23	42.86	
Sérgio Farias	Brazil	16 May 2016	16 July 2016	0	0	0	0	0	0	—	
Nelo Vingada	Portugal	16 July 2016	4 December 2016	14	5	3	6	14	14	35.71	
João de Deus	Portugal	17 July 2017	2 January 2018	8	2	1	5	4	13	25.00	
Avram Grant	Israel	2 January 2018	15 March 2018	10	1	1	8	8	14	10.00	
Eelco Schattorie	Netherlands	17 August 2018	11 March 2019	20	8	8	4	24	21	40.00	
Robert Jarni	Croatia	5 August 2019	10 February 2020	15	2	7	6	12	21	13.33	
Khalid Jamil (interim)	India	10 February 2020	25 February 2020	3	0	1	2	4	9	0.00	
Gerard Nus	Spain	25 August 2020	12 January 2021	11	2	6	3	13	15	18.18	
Khalid Jamil (interim)	India	12 January 2021	9 March 2021	11	6	4	1	20	13	54.55	
Khalid Jamil	India	23 October 2021	May 2022	20	3	5	12	25	43	15.00	
Marco Balbul	Israel	11 August 2022	7 December 2022	8	0	0	8	4	18	0.00	
Vincenzo Alberto Annese	Italy	8 December 2022	1 March 2023	12	1	2	9	16	37	8.33	
Juan Pedro Benali	Spain	22 May 2023	Present*	83	37	23	23	154	108	44.58	Durand Cup (2024, 2025)

== Managerial Records ==
Note: Interim managers and caretakers have been excluded from the list

As of 21 May 2026

- Most Matches Managed: (Spain) Juan Pedro Benali –83
- Least Matches Managed: (Brazil) Sérgio Farias –0
- Most Honours: (Spain) Juan Pedro Benali
- Most Wins: (Spain) Juan Pedro Benali –37
- Most Defeats: (Spain) Juan Pedro Benali –23
- Highest Win Percentage: (Spain) Juan Pedro Benali –44.58
- Least Win Percentage: (Israel) Marco Balbul –0.00
- Most Goals Scored: (Spain) Juan Pedro Benali –154
- Most Goals Conceded: (Spain) Juan Pedro Benali –108
- Most Matches as Assistant Manager: (India) Naushad Moosa

=== Coaches individual awards while coaching NorthEast United ===
- NorthEast United coaches that have won the FPAI Coach of the Year award: (India) Khalid Jamil: (1) 2020–21

== Assistant Managers ==
The following is a list of all the persons who worked as an Assistant Manager for the club.

- (India) Thangboi Singto (2014)
- (Venezuela) Guillermo Sanchez (2015)
- (India) Santosh Kashyap (2015)
- (Portugal) Arnaldo Carvalho (2016)
- (India) Francisco Bruto Da Costa (2016)
- (Portugal) João Carlos Malhante de Pinho (2017–18)
- (Netherlands) Eelco Schattorie (2017–18)
- (Australia) Shaun Ontong (2018–19)
- (Australia) Arthur Papas (2018–19)
- (India) Khalid Jamil (2019–20)
- (Croatia) Sasa Glavas (2019–20)
- (Spain) Ivan Piñol (2020–21)
- (India) Alison Kharsyntiew (2020–2022)
- (England) Paul Groves (2022–2023)
- (India) Floyd Pinto (2022–2023)
- (India) Naushad Moosa (2023–)
- (Spain) Sergio Sesi (2025–)

== Goalkeeping Coach ==
The following is a list of all the persons who worked as a Goalkeeping Coach for the club.

- (France) Gennaro Bracigliano (2015)
- (Portugal) Luís Matos (2016)
- (India) Joseph Sidy (2017–19)
- (India) Sandip Nandy (2019–20)
- (Spain) Asier Rey Santín (2020–2022)
- (Romania) Christian Patru (2021)
- (India) Dipankar Choudhury (2022–2024)
- (Spain) Manuel Diez Aznar (2024–)

== See also ==
- NorthEast United
- NorthEast United FC Reserves and Academy
- List of NorthEast United FC players
