= Selorm =

Selorm is a given name. It is most commonly used amongst the Ewe people of Togo and Ghana. The name comes from the Ewe language expression, selɔ̃mí, meaning "God loves me". Notable people with the name include:

- Selorm Adadevoh, Ghanaian business executive
- Selorm Geraldo (born 1996), Ghanaian footballer
- Selorm Galley, who goes by the nickname Selly, Ghanian actress and presenter
