= Yakubu Mohammed (footballer, born 1996) =

DR Congolese footballer

Personal information
- Full name: Yakubu Mohammed
- Date of birth: 7 June 1996 (age 30)
- Place of birth: Accra, Ghana
- Height: 1.78 m (5 ft 10 in)
- Position: Defender

Team information
- Current team: Azam

Senior career*
Years	Team	Apps	(Gls)
2011–2012	Red Bull Ghana		
2012	D'International		
2012–2015	Ashanti Gold		
2015–2016	Union Aït Melloul		
2016	Raja Casablanca		
2016	Aduana Stars		
2016–	Azam		

International career^{‡}
2015–2020	Ghana	2	(0)
- * Club domestic league appearances and goals as of 12 March 2021 ‡ National team caps and goals as of 12 March 2021

Yakubu Mohammed (born 7 June 1996) is a Ghanaian professional footballer who plays as a defender for the Tanzanian club Azam. He represents the Ghana national team.

== Career ==
Mohammed began his career in Ghana with Red Bull Ghana, D'International and Ashanti Gold. He moved to Morocco in 2015 with Union Aït Melloul and Raja Casablanca, before returning to Ghana with Aduana Stars. He moved to Tanzania in 2016 with Azam.

== International career ==
Mohammed made his debut with the Ghana national team in a 2–1 2015 COSAFA Cup win over Madagascar on 25 May 2015.
