= Eelco Schattorie =

Dutch football manager (born 1971)

Personal information
- Date of birth: 18 December 1971 (age 54)
- Place of birth: Swalmen, Netherlands

Team information
- Current team: Al-Shabab (manager)

Managerial career
- Years: Team
- 2007–2008: Al-Riffa
- 2008–2009: Muscat
- 2009–2010: Fanja
- 2010–2011: Al-Khaleej
- 2011–2012: Red Bull Ghana
- 2012–2014: United
- 2015–2016: East Bengal
- 2016–2017: Al-Ettifaq
- 2017–2018: Al-Ettifaq (caretaker)
- 2018–2019: NorthEast United
- 2019–2020: Kerala Blasters
- 2024–2026: Al-Safa
- 2026–: Al-Shabab

Eelco Schattorie (born 18 December 1971) is a Dutch professional football manager.

== Career ==
Born in Swalmen, Schattorie started as a youth and assistant coach, later becoming the caretaker manager and finally Technical Director for Youth Development with Dutch club VVV-Venlo. In 1996, he served as the club's head coach on a caretaker basis for four matches after former head coach, Jan Versleijen, left the club. During his 3 league games and single cup game in charge, he earned the unusual record of being the club's only undefeated coach in history, an achievement he still retains. This run started with a 0-1 victory at FC Dordrecht, another victory against FC Emmen at home and a draw at FC den Bosch. One of his biggest achievements during his twelve-year stay at VVV Venlo was successfully bringing a lot of talents from the youth academy to the first team.

In 1999, he successfully obtained the highest tier UEFA PRO license at the age of 28. He was the youngest coach ever to obtain the UEFA PRO License under the official guidelines of the Dutch Football Association, the KNVB. Over the course of his career, Eelco maintained a win rate of over 53.4% as head coach.

In 2002, Schattorie moved to the United Arab Emirates to rejoin Jan Versleljen as assistant manager and U-18 manager at Al Jazira. After spending a season in the UAE, Schattorie followed Versleijen to Saudi Arabia to again work as an assistant with Al-Ettifaq. He also later worked as assistant coach to Versleijen at another Emirati club, Al-Shaab. Schattorie returned to Al-Ettifaq in 2008 as U-23 head coach and helped the side win the Prince Faisal bin Fahd Cup. Schattorie then moved to Oman where he served as Technical Director at Muscat Club.

Schattorie became the head coach of Bahraini club, Al-Riffa before returning to Muscat Club as their head coach in 2007. After joining the club when they were bottom of the table, Schattorie managed to help the capital side finish eighth in the division, saving them from relegation. He then stayed with the club until February 2009, when he became the head coach of Omani side, Fanja. After going undefeated for most of the 2009–10 season, Fanja were eventually defeated in the promotion play-offs against Al-Oruba. Despite the season going very well for Schattorie, he was still let go by the club. Schattorie soon moved back to Saudi Arabia, where he became head coach of Al-Khaleej in 2010. After spending years in the Middle-East, Schattorie moved to Africa, where he signed as head coach of Red Bull Ghana from 2011 to 2012.

=== Red Bull Ghana: 2011–2012 ===
Eelco Schattorie joined the Red Bull Salzburg establishment in February 2011. He was appointed head coach at the Red Bull Ghana Academy in Africa. On his arrival, the first team had 5 games to go and had to be saved from relegation. Eelco managed to preserve the team's league status and started the new season building a team with the next new talents.

In his brief time in Ghana, Eelco was able to assess and develop a number of young prospects. One of them was Patrick Twumasi, who went on to receive 2 caps from the Ghana national football team. Eelco parted ways with the club when Red Bull pulled the plug because of organizational reasons, and the club's subsequent merger with Feyenoord from the Netherlands.

=== Prayag United: 2012–2014 ===
On 9 November 2012, it was announced that Schattorie would become the new head coach of Prayag United of the I-League in India, taking over on matchday 6 of the 2012-13 season.

He managed his first game on 10 November 2012, when he led Prayag United to a 10–1 victory over newly promoted United Sikkim. Schattorie won his first and only cup for the side on 20 March 2013 when Prayag United defeated East Bengal in the IFA Shield final 1–0 through a Ranti Martins goal. Eelco eventually finished the campaign, leading Prayag United to a fourth-place finish.

Entering the 2013–14 season, Prayag United were hit hard financially by the chit fund scam. After successfully dealing with the trouble given to him by sponsors, Eelco left the club in January 2014.

=== East Bengal: 2015 ===
On 19 February 2015 it was announced that Schattorie would return to the I-League to manage East Bengal. He lost his first match in charge by four goals to one in an AFC Cup match, against Johor Darul Ta'zim of Malaysia. Schattorie then managed the club in the I-League for the first time on 1 March 2015 against Dempo at the Fatorda Stadium. Five goals from Ranti Martins saw East Bengal come out as 5–1 winners.

After the season ended, Schattorie left the club and was replaced by Biswajit Bhattacharya.

=== Al-Ettifaq: 2016-2017 ===
In August 2016, Eelco joined Al-Ettifaq for the 4th time, with an ambition to promote their Olympic Team to the highest division of Saudi Arabian football. On 29 October 2016 Eelco replaced Tunisian head coach Djamel Belkacem and defeated Al Taawoun 3-0 in his first game in charge. Eelco would step back to the Olympic Team, and Spanish coach Juan Carlos Garrido took over the rest of the season. On 18 February 2017 Garrido was sacked after 12 games without a win, and so Eelco was once again called upon as caretaker coach until the end of the season. Eelco was in charge of the last 9 games and saved the team from relegation.

=== NorthEast United ===
On 4 January 2018 Eelco was appointed as the assistant coach of Avram Grant in Northeast United. On 17 August 2018 it was announced that Eelco had been promoted as the head coach for the 2018-19 season. Under him, NorthEast United would reachto the playoffs for the first time in the club's history.

=== Kerala Blasters ===
On 19 May 2019 Eelco was announced as the head coach of Kerala Blasters. Even though Eelco was a fan favorite in Kerala for his style of play, he would only help the club to a 7th place finish. After the season, Kerala Blasters parted ways with Eelco on 22 April 2020. Under him, the club registered their best ever victory against Hyderabad FC, winning the match by a scoreline of 5-1.

Al Seeb Club

On 25 September 2021 Eelco was announced as the head coach of Oman Professional League club Al Seeb SC.

On 8 December 2021, for personal reasons, he announced that he resigned as the manager of Al Seeb.

=== Al-Safa ===
On 18 October 2024, Schattorie was appointed as manager of Al-Safa. He resigned from his position on 6 December 2024.

== Managerial statistics ==
=== Managerial record ===
As of match played 12 January 2021

Managerial record by team and tenure
| Team | Country | From | To | Record | | | | |
| Team | Country | From | To | P | W | D | L | Win % |
|---|---|---|---|---|---|---|---|---|
| Al-Riffa | Bahrain | 20 March 2007 | 30 June 2008 | 22 | 11 | 7 | 4 | 50.0 |
| Fanja | Oman | 03 March 2010 | 15 May 2010 | 11 | 3 | 6 | 2 | 27.3 |
| East Bengal | India | 20 February 2015 | 30 June 2015 | 20 | 8 | 4 | 8 | 40.0 |
| Al-Ettifaq | Saudi Arabia | 18 February 2017 | 4 May 2017 | 7 | 1 | 2 | 4 | 14.3 |
| NorthEast United | India | 17 August 2018 | 19 May 2019 | 20 | 8 | 8 | 4 | 40.0 |
| Kerala Blasters | India | 19 May 2019 | 22 April 2020 | 18 | 4 | 7 | 7 | 22.2 |
| Al-Seeb SC | Oman | 25 September 2021 | 8 December 2021 | 0 | 0 | 0 | 0 | — |
| Al-Safa | Saudi Arabia | 18 October 2024 | 6 December 2024 | 6 | 3 | 0 | 3 | 50.0 |
| Total | | | | 104 | 38 | 34 | 32 | 36.5 |
