= Joshua Otoo =

Ghanaian professional footballer

Personal information
- Full name: Joshua Otoo Opoku
- Date of birth: 6 April 1990 (age 36)
- Place of birth: Accra, Greater Accra, Ghana
- Height: 1.90 m (6 ft 3 in)
- Position: Defender

Team information
- Current team: Hearts of Oak
- Number: 20

Youth career
- 2001–2003: Vision Soccer Academy
- 2004–2008: Auroras F.C.

Senior career*
Years	Team	Apps	(Gls)
2008	Hearts of Oak		
2009–2010	Red Bull Ghana		
2010–2015	Wa All Stars		
2016	Gandzasar Kapan	3	(0)
2016–	Hearts of Oak		

International career^{‡}
2009–	Ghana	1	(0)
- * Club domestic league appearances and goals as of 10 August 2016 ‡ National team caps and goals as of 10 August 2016

Joshua Otoo Opoku (born 6 April 1990), simply known as Joshua Otoo, is a Ghanaian professional footballer who plays as a right-back, for Hearts of Oak.

== Career ==
=== Club ===
Otoo's began his career club career in the Vision Soccer Academy and signed in January 2004 with Auroras FC. After four-and-a-half years with Auroras FC Otoo left the club to sign on 11 June 2008 for Accra Hearts of Oak SC. On 1 December 2009, Otoo joined Ghana Football Leagues club Red Bull Ghana prior to joining on 1 July 2010 Ghana Premier League club Wa All Stars in the 2010–2011 Ghanaian Premier League season.

In January 2016, Otoo joined Armenian side Gandzasar Kapan, having previously agreed a deal with Hearts of Oak.

=== International ===
Otoo's first call-up in the Ghana national football team for a friendly match against Argentina national football team, and Otoo earned his debut in the match on 1 October 2009. Otoo was included in the Ghana preliminary team for the 2014 African Nations Championship, and finished as runner-up.

== Career statistics ==
=== Club ===
As of match played 22 May 2016

Appearances and goals by club, season and competition
Club	Season	League			National Cup		Continental		Total	
Club	Season	Division	Apps	Goals	Apps	Goals	Apps	Goals	Apps	Goals
Gandzasar Kapan	2015–16	Armenian Premier League	3	0	0	0	–		3	0
Career total			3	0	0	0	-	-	3	0

=== International ===
Ghana
Year	Apps	Goals
2009	1	0
Total	1	0

Statistics accurate as of match played 30 September 2009
