= Red Bull Ghana =

- Full name: Red Bull Ghana
- Nickname: Red Bulls
- Founded: 2008
- Dissolved: 2014
- Ground: Red Bull Academy Stadium; Sogakope, South Tongu District, Ghana
- Capacity: 1,000
- Owner: (Austria) Red Bull GmbH
- Chairman: (Austria) Stefan Kozak
- Manager: (Netherlands) Sipke Hulshoff
- League: Division One League Zone 3B
Home colours	Away colours

Red Bull Ghana was a Ghanaian professional football club and academy based in Sogakope, South Tongu District, Ghana, which was founded in 2008 and closed in 2014. The club was owned by Red Bull and last played in Division One League Zone 3B.

== History ==
Founded in 2008, the academy associated with the team has gone on to produce coaches and players alike. The team reached the second highest league in Ghana in 2009. Red Bull Ghana was relegated to Division Two in 2013. In August 2014 Red Bull closed the academy and the club and it was merged with Feyenoord Academy to West African Football Academy.

Red Bull Ghana U17s lost 2–3 on penalties in the final of an International Tournament in Croix, France.

== Head coaches ==
- (Germany) Daniel Heidemann (2008–2010)
- (Denmark) Henrik Pedersen (2010)
- (Netherlands) Eelco Schattorie (2011–2012)
- (Netherlands) Sipke Hulshoff (2012–2014)

== Technical directors ==
- (Netherlands) Petrus In 't Groen (2010–2014)

== Notable players ==
=== FIFA World Cup participants ===
- (Ghana) Lawrence Ati-Zigi (2022, 2026)

=== Africa Cup of Nations participants ===
- (Ghana) Samuel Owusu (2019, 2021)
- (Ghana) Lawrence Ati-Zigi (2019, 2021, 2023)

=== Other national team representants ===
- (Ghana) Raphael Dwamena
- (Nigeria) Olarenwaju Kayode
- (Ghana) Fatawu Mohammed
- (Ghana) Yakubu Mohammed
- (Ghana) Augustine Okrah
- (Ghana) Joshua Otoo
- (Ghana) Patrick Twumasi

=== Other players ===
- (Ghana) Reuben Acquah
- (Ghana) Felix Adjei
- (Ghana) Prince Agyemang
- (Ghana) Joseph Cudjoe
- (Ghana) Selorm Geraldo
- (Ghana) Abass Mohammed
- (Ghana) Seth Paintsil
- (Ghana) Abdul-Aziz Yakubu

== See also ==
- RB Leipzig
- New York Red Bulls
- FC Red Bull Salzburg
- FC Liefering
- Red Bull Bragantino
- Red Bull Brasil
