= 2009–10 Oman First Division League =

Oman First Division League
- Season: 2009–10
- Matches played: 62
- Goals scored: 168 (2.71 per match)

The 2009-10 Oman First Division League (known as the Omantel First Division League for sponsorship reasons) was the 34th edition of the second-highest division overall football league in Oman. The season began on 3 March 2010 and concluded on 12 May 2010.

== Group stage ==
As of 15 April 2010

=== Group A ===
Team	Pld	W	D	L	GF	GA	GD	Pts
(Oman) Ahli Sidab	7	5	1	1	9	3	+6	16
(Oman) Fanja	7	3	4	0	7	3	+4	13
(Oman) Al-Musannah	7	3	3	1	15	12	+3	12
(Oman) Bahla	7	3	2	2	11	10	+1	11
(Oman) Mirbat	7	2	3	2	11	11	0	9
(Oman) Al-Bashaer	7	2	2	3	9	10	−1	8
(Oman) Sohar	7	1	2	4	5	9	−4	5
(Oman) Ja'lan	7	0	1	6	5	14	−9	1

=== Group B ===
Team	Pld	W	D	L	GF	GA	GD	Pts
(Oman) Salalah	7	5	2	0	12	3	+9	17
(Oman) Al-Ittihad	7	5	1	1	21	14	+7	16
(Oman) Al-Mudhaibi	7	4	2	1	17	8	+9	14
(Oman) Al-Wahda	7	2	5	0	12	9	+3	11
(Oman) Sur	7	3	1	3	14	14	0	10
(Oman) Samail	7	2	1	4	11	13	−2	7
(Oman) Majees	7	0	1	6	4	14	−10	1
(Oman) Al-Salam	7	0	1	6	5	21	−16	1

== Semifinals ==
4 teams played a knockout tie. 2 ties were played over two legs. The first match was played between Fanja SC and Salalah SC on 28 April 2010.

=== 1st Legs ===
28 April 2010	Fanja	2 - 2	Salalah	Nizwa Sports Complex, Nizwa, Oman
19:30 UTC+4

28 April 2010	Al-Ittihad	2 - 2	Ahli Sidab	Al-Saada Stadium, Salalah, Oman
19:30 UTC+4

=== 2nd Legs ===
3 May 2010	Salalah	1 - 0	Fanja	Al-Saada Stadium, Salalah, Oman
19:30 UTC+4

3 May 2010	Ahli Sidab	1 - 1	Al-Ittihad	Al-Seeb Stadium, Al-Seeb, Oman
19:30 UTC+4

== 3/4th Place match ==
8 May 2010	Fanja	3 - 1	Al-Ittihad	Al-Seeb Stadium, Al-Seeb, Oman
19:30 UTC+4

== Finals ==
12 May 2010	Ahli Sidab	1 - 0	Salalah	Al-Seeb Stadium, Al-Seeb, Oman
19:30 UTC+4	Naif 85'

== Promotion/relegation play-off ==
=== 1st leg ===
18 May 2010
19:30 UTC+4

Al-Oruba	2 - 1	Fanja
Andreas Haddad 8', 89'	Report	Haitham Al-Alawi 17'

Sur Sports Complex, Sur, Oman

=== 2nd leg ===
13 May 2010
19:30 UTC+4

Fanja	0 - 0	Al-Oruba
	Report

Seeb Stadium, Seeb, Al Batinah, Oman

Al Oruba secured promotion after winning 2:1 on aggregate
