= César Farías =

Venezuelan football player (born 1973)

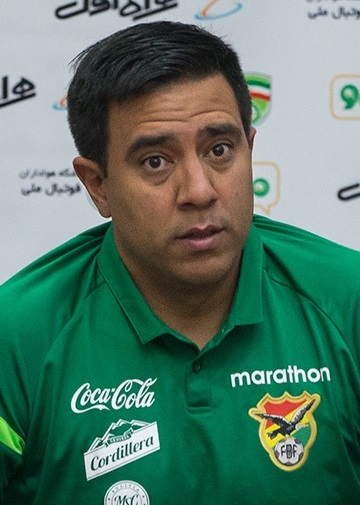
- Farías with the Bolivia national team in 2018

Personal information
- Full name: César Alejandro Farías Acosta
- Date of birth: 7 March 1973 (age 53)
- Place of birth: Güiria, Venezuela
- Height: 1.69 m (5 ft 6 1/2 in)

Managerial career
- Years: Team
- 1998: Nueva Cádiz
- 2002: Trujillanos
- 2003–2005: Deportivo Táchira
- 2005–2006: Mineros de Guayana
- 2007: Deportivo Anzoátegui
- 2007–2013: Venezuela
- 2008–2009: Venezuela U20
- 2013–2014: Tijuana
- 2015: NorthEast United
- 2016: Cerro Porteño
- 2016–2017: The Strongest
- 2018–2019: Bolivia (caretaker)
- 2018–2019: The Strongest
- 2019–2022: Bolivia
- 2019–2022: Bolivia U23
- 2022–2023: Aucas
- 2023: Águilas Doradas
- 2024: América de Cali
- 2024–2025: Junior
- 2026: Barcelona SC

César Alejandro Farías Acosta (born 7 March 1973) is a Venezuelan football manager.

Farías is known for having coached Deportivo Táchira, Mineros de Guayana, Deportivo Anzoátegui and the Venezuelan U-20 team. He is the first and only manager to ever have taken Venezuela to the semi-final stage of the Copa America. In 2009, he was in charge of Venezuela's U-20 team as it qualified for the first time in its history to the FIFA U-20 World Cup.

== Managerial career ==
=== Early career ===
Farías was born in Guiria. In 1998, he started his managerial career in Nueva Cádiz FC; that same year, his team went on to win the Venezuelan Segunda División. In 2002, he had his debut in the Venezuelan Primera División as the manager of Trujillanos FC. In 2003, he was appointed coach of Deportivo Táchira. In 2005, he was fired by the administrative board of Deportivo Tachira but was then hired, shortly after, by Mineros de Guayana.

In 2007, after having had a very good season with Mineros de Guayana, he was hired by Deportivo Anzoátegui. That same year, the team went on to finish first within the Venezuelan Primera Division.

=== Venezuelan national U-20 football team ===
In April 2008, he was appointed coach of the Venezuelan U-20 team. The team went on to qualify for the first time ever to the FIFA U-20 World Cup in 2009.

=== Venezuela national football team ===
On 26 November 2007, the Venezuelan Football Federation announced the departure of Richard Páez as coach of the Venezuela national football team. After weeks of negotiations with several coaches, the Venezuelan Football Federation officially announced that Farías would replace Páez as coach.

On 3 February 2008, Farías debuted as coach of the Venezuela national team with a 1–0 win over Haiti. Several months later, on June 6, during a friendly match in preparation for the FIFA World Cup qualification, Venezuela defeated Brazil for the first time in its history with a final score of 2–0.

On 18 June 2008, Farías debuted in the FIFA World Cup qualifiers with a 1–1 draw against Uruguay at the Estadio Centenario of Montevideo. He nearly achieved qualification to the 2010 FIFA World Cup, after finishing only two points away from a highly disputed 5th place qualification spot.

In the 2011 Copa América held in Argentina, he became the second coach to ever guide Venezuela to the knockout stages of the tournament. He saw his team advance to the knockout stages following draws with Brazil (0–0) and Paraguay (3–3) and a victory over Ecuador (1–0). He also became the first coach to take Venezuela to the semi-final stage of the Copa America after his team defeated Chile 2–1 in the quarter finals.

=== Tijuana ===
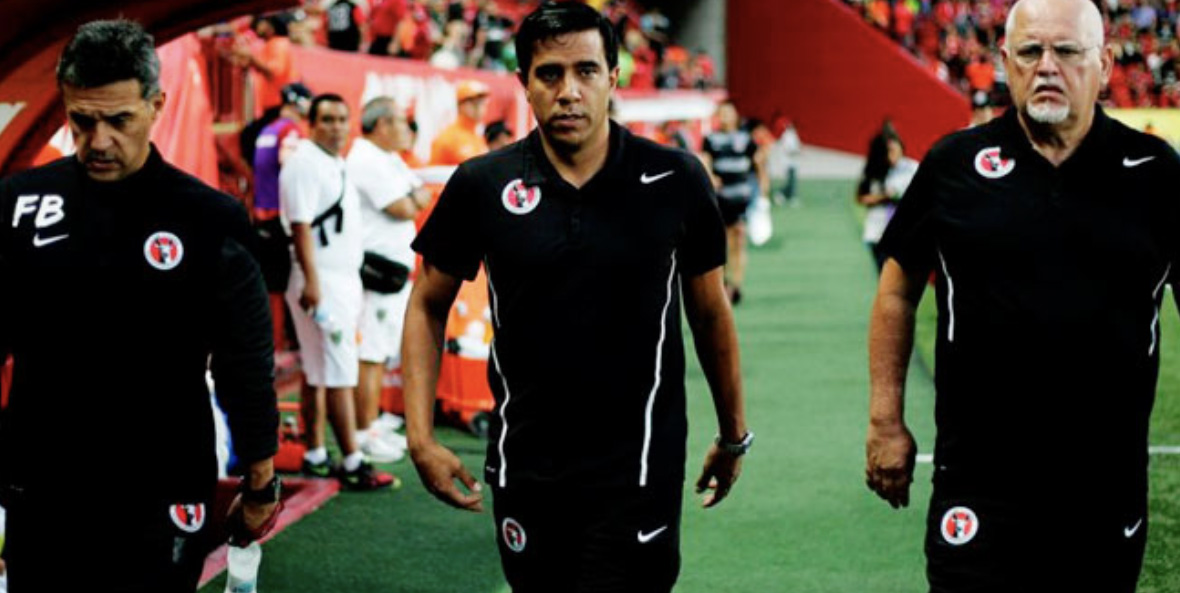
Fabian Bazan (left), Cesar Farias (middle), Lino Alonso (right)

Cesar Farias became Xolos manager in December 2013. In his first season in the Liga MX, he reached the playoffs only to be eliminated by Toluca in the quarter-finals. On April 9, 2014, in the Concacaf Champions League, his team was eliminated in the semi-finals by eventual winners, Cruz Azul. At the end of the game as things were heating up, Farias came over to Jerónimo Amione but quickly snapped as he shoved him, then Armando Perea who tried to calm him down and also David Stringel. Then he exchanged hands with the Cruz Azul doctor, Alfonso Jimenez who he knocked him onto the ground. 8 days later on April 17, CONCACAF decided to punish Farias 2 games for his participation in the fracas, fining the club (Tijuana) and his player Hernan Pellerano receiving the worse punishment of 6 games for spitting (5 games) at Jesus Corona and the red card (1 game) he picked up in the end of the game.

=== NorthEast United ===
On 1 July 2015, Farías signed as the manager of Indian Super League club NorthEast United FC. He took the bottom placed team to the 5th position finish in the league, despite injury to some of his key players at the start of the tournament.

=== Bolivia ===
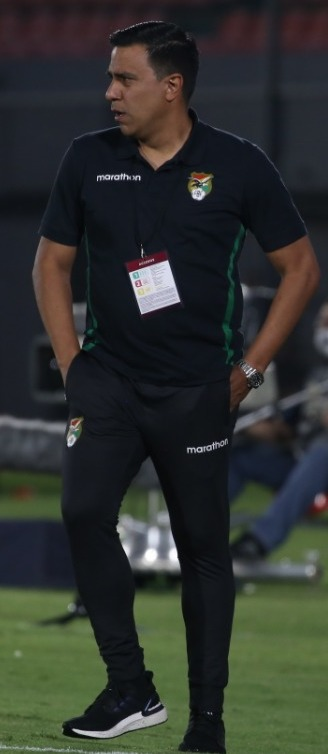
Farías with the Bolivia national team in 2020

César Farías arrived in Bolivia in 2016 to manage The Strongest of La Paz. Later he was appointed as caretaker coach of the national team, following Bolivia's failure to qualify for the 2018 FIFA World Cup. As a caretaker coach, he went on an Asian tour, where he managed only one win over Myanmar 3–0, but also only suffered one minimal loss against Iran. After the tour, he returned to coach The Strongest.

After the 2019 Copa América, in which Bolivia had a disappointing campaign (with three straight defeats), Farías was officially appointed as coach of Bolivia, tasked with helping Bolivia to qualify for the 2022 FIFA World Cup. He was in charge of the under-23 team as well.

In his first major competition for Bolivia as coach, for the 2020 CONMEBOL Pre-Olympic Tournament, the Bolivian team would have an outstanding performance, including two shock wins over powerhouses Uruguay and Peru; however, Bolivia did not place in the final round due to ultimately losing to the Brasil team.

=== Aucas ===
Farías became Aucas manager in 2022. In his first season with the Ecuadorian team, he won undefeated the second stage of the 2022 Ecuadorian Serie A and eventually ended the trophy drought for Aucas by beating Barcelona in the final. With their first Ecuadorian Serie A championship, Aucas automatically qualified for the 2023 Copa Libertadores. On 5 April 2023, Aucas defeated the incumbent Copa Libertadores champions, Flamengo 2–1. Not only was this Aucas's Copa Libertadores debut, but it was the first time a defending champion lost their first Copa Libertadores game.

On 11 June 2023, during a league game against Delfín, Farías assaulted two Delfín players when he was allegedly pushed accidentally, pushing one to the ground as they covered their head with their hands. Another player could be seen restraining Farías. He was sent off in the 14th minute, and received more severe sanctions from the Ecuadorian League. Ultimately, Farías was suspended for 14 months and would not be eligible to manage Aucas until September 2024. On 15 June, Aucas announced that the Venezuelan manager would no longer be in charge of the team.

=== Águilas Doradas ===
On 28 June 2023, Farías arrived in Colombia as he was presented as the new manager of Águilas Doradas, in the country's top tier. In the 2023 Finalización, Farías led Águilas to become the first team to go unbeaten in the first stage of the Colombian league tournament, but the team was eliminated in the semifinals. He resigned from the club on 29 December 2023.

=== América de Cali ===
On 23 January 2024, Farías signed as the new manager of América de Cali, but he left the club by mutual agreement four months later after failing to reach the semifinals of the 2024 Apertura.

=== Junior ===
On 3 September 2024, Farías became manager of fellow Primera A club Junior, replacing Arturo Reyes. He was fired from Junior on 20 June 2025, after the club failed to advance to the group stage of the 2025 Copa Sudamericana, losing to Farías's former club América de Cali on penalties, and only collected one point in six matches of the 2025 Apertura's semifinal stage.

== Personal life ==
Farías's younger brother Daniel Farías was also a footballer.

== Honours ==
Nueva Cádiz

- Venezuelan Segunda División: 1998

Aucas

- Ecuadorian Serie A: 2022

The Strongest

- División Profesional: 2016-A

Venezuela U20

- Copa Gobernación del Zulia: 2009
- L'Alcúdia youth tournament runner-up 2009

Individual

- 2009 L'Alcúdia youth tournament: Best coach
