= Venezuela at the Copa América =

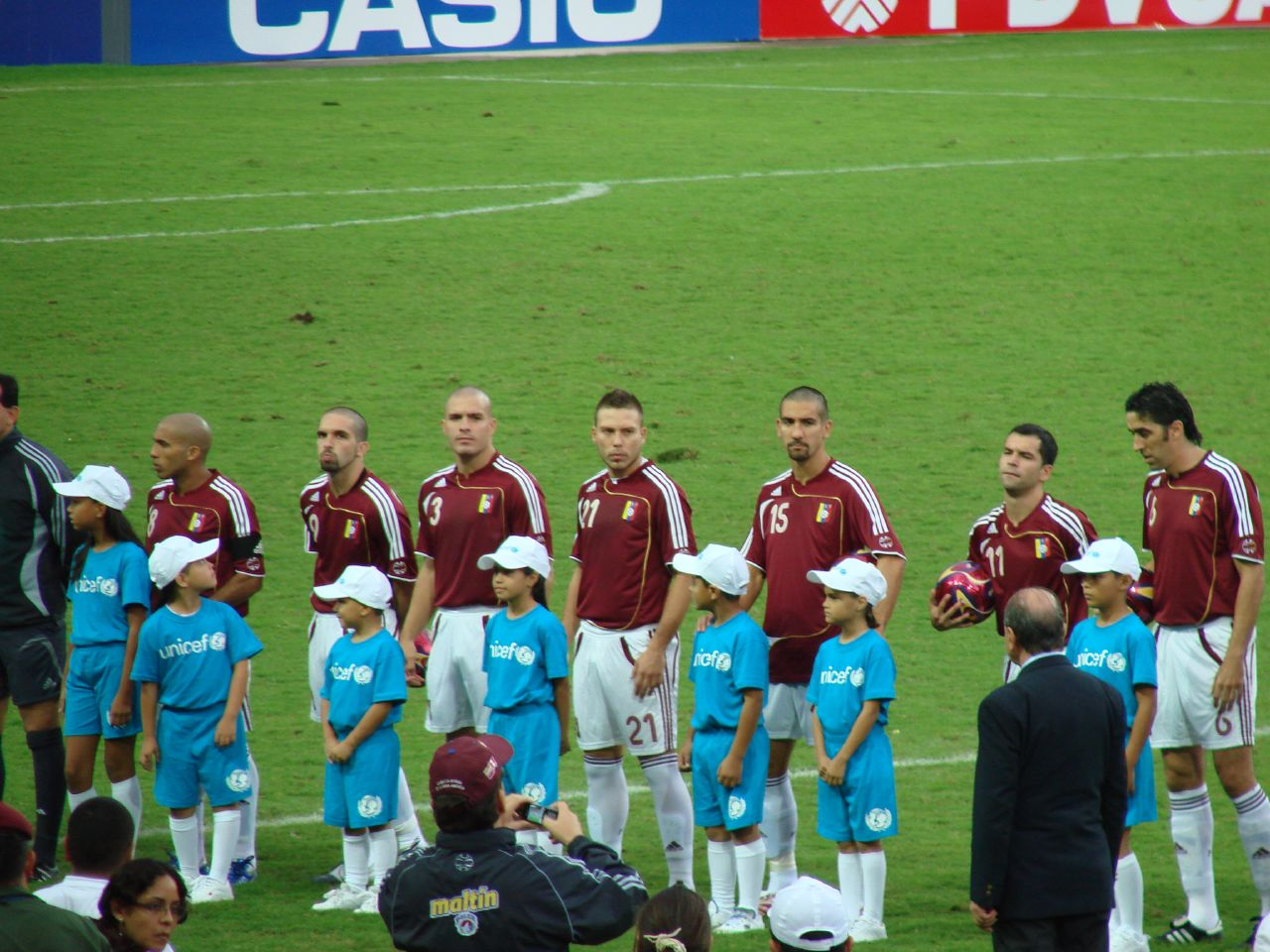
Venezuela lining up for their group match against Peru in 2007. It would become their first victory since the introduction of the modern Copa América in 1975.

The Copa América is South America's major tournament in senior men's football and determines the continental champion. It is the oldest continental championship in the world with its first edition held in 1916. Until 1967, the tournament was known as South American Championship. It was that last edition of the old format when Venezuela participated for the first time.

Venezuela did not win a match in twelve consecutive participations from 1975 to 2004. They have never been in the top three, and are the only CONMEBOL member to be outside the top ten of the Copa América's all-time table, because regular invitee Mexico surpassed them.

== Overall record ==
South American Championship / Copa América record
Year	Round	Position	Pld	W	D	L	GF	GA	Squad
(Argentina) 1916	Not a CONMEBOL member								
(Uruguay) 1917	Not a CONMEBOL member								
(Brazil) 1919	Not a CONMEBOL member								
(Chile) 1920	Not a CONMEBOL member								
(Argentina) 1921	Not a CONMEBOL member								
(Brazil) 1922	Not a CONMEBOL member								
(Uruguay) 1923	Not a CONMEBOL member								
(Uruguay) 1924	Not a CONMEBOL member								
(Argentina) 1925	Not a CONMEBOL member								
(Chile) 1926	Not a CONMEBOL member								
(Peru) 1927	Not a CONMEBOL member								
(Argentina) 1929	Not a CONMEBOL member								
(Peru) 1935	Not a CONMEBOL member								
(Argentina) 1937	Not a CONMEBOL member								
(Peru) 1939	Not a CONMEBOL member								
(Chile) 1941	Not a CONMEBOL member								
(Uruguay) 1942	Not a CONMEBOL member								
(Chile) 1945	Not a CONMEBOL member								
(Argentina) 1946	Not a CONMEBOL member								
(Ecuador) 1947	Not a CONMEBOL member								
(Brazil) 1949	Not a CONMEBOL member								
(Peru) 1953	Did not participate								
(Chile) 1955	Did not participate								
(Uruguay) 1956	Did not participate								
(Peru) 1957	Did not participate								
(Argentina) 1959	Did not participate								
(Ecuador) 1959	Did not participate								
(Bolivia) 1963	Did not participate								
(Uruguay) 1967	Fifth place	5th	5	1	0	4	7	16	Squad
1975	Group stage	10th	4	0	0	4	1	26	Squad
1979	Group stage	10th	4	0	2	2	1	12	Squad
1983	Group stage	10th	4	0	1	3	1	10	Squad
(Argentina) 1987	Group stage	10th	2	0	0	2	1	8	Squad
(Brazil) 1989	Group stage	10th	4	0	1	3	4	11	Squad
(Chile) 1991	Group stage	10th	4	0	0	4	1	15	Squad
(Ecuador) 1993	Group stage	11th	3	0	2	1	6	11	Squad
(Uruguay) 1995	Group stage	12th	3	0	0	3	4	10	Squad
(Bolivia) 1997	Group stage	12th	3	0	0	3	0	5	Squad
(Paraguay) 1999	Group stage	12th	3	0	0	3	1	13	Squad
(Colombia) 2001	Group stage	12th	3	0	0	3	0	7	Squad
(Peru) 2004	Group stage	11th	3	0	1	2	2	5	Squad
(Venezuela) 2007	Quarter-finals	6th	4	1	2	1	5	6	Squad
(Argentina) 2011	Fourth place	4th	6	2	3	1	7	8	Squad
(Chile) 2015	Group stage	9th	3	1	0	2	2	3	Squad
(United States) 2016	Quarter-finals	6th	4	2	1	1	4	5	Squad
(Brazil) 2019	Quarter-finals	7th	4	1	2	1	3	3	Squad
(Brazil) 2021	Group stage	9th	4	0	2	2	2	6	Squad
(United States) 2024	Quarter-finals	5th	4	3	1	0	7	2	Squad
Total	Fourth place	20/48	74	11	18	45	59	182	—

== Record by opponent ==
Copa América matches (by team)
Opponent	W	D	L	Pld	GF	GA
Argentina	0	0	6	6	3	30
Bolivia	2	2	1	5	9	5
Brazil	0	2	7	9	2	30
Canada	0	1	0	1	1	1
Chile	1	2	7	10	4	25
Colombia	1	2	4	7	3	11
Ecuador	2	1	2	5	6	13
Jamaica	2	0	0	2	4	0
Mexico	1	1	2	4	4	7
Paraguay	0	2	4	6	8	19
Peru	1	2	6	9	6	17
United States	0	1	0	1	3	3
Uruguay	1	2	6	9	6	21
Total	11	18	45	74	59	182

== Record players ==
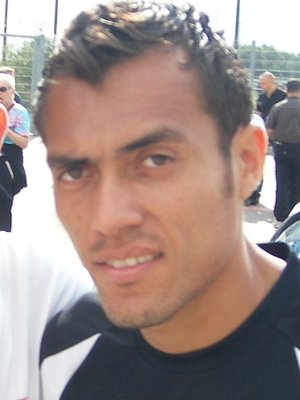
Juan Arango has represented Venezuela the second-most times at continental championships.

Rank	Player	Matches	Tournaments
1	Salomón Rondón	21	2011, 2015, 2016, 2019 and 2024
2	Juan Arango	20	1999, 2001, 2004, 2007, 2011 and 2015
3	Tomás Rincón	19	2011, 2015, 2016, 2019 and 2024
4	José Manuel Rey	18	1997, 1999, 2001, 2004, 2007 and 2011
5	Roberto Rosales	16	2011, 2015, 2016, 2019 and 2021
6	Luis Mendoza	13	1967, 1975 and 1979
6	Pedro Acosta	13	1979, 1983, 1987 and 1989
8	Stalin Rivas	12	1989, 1991, 1993 and 1995
8	Renny Vega	12	1999, 2007 and 2011
8	Oswaldo Vizcarrondo	12	2011, 2015 and 2016

== Top goalscorers ==
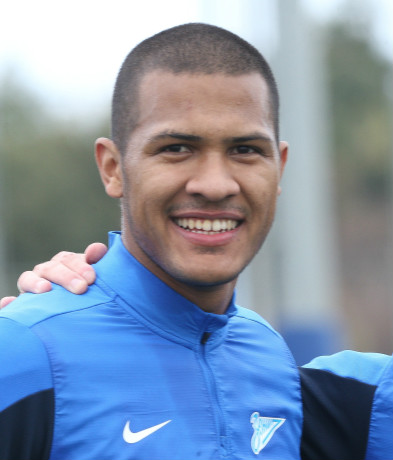
Salomón Rondón is Venezuela's only player to score at four separate Copa América tournaments.

With four goals, José Luis Dolgetta became the top scorer of the 1993 tournament and thus the only Venezuelan ever to receive a reward at a continental competition.

In 2007, Carlos Maldonado's son Giancarlo also scored a Copa América goal.

Rank	Player	Goals	Tournaments (goals)
1	Salomón Rondón	7	2011, 2015, 2016 (2) and 2024 (3)
2	José Luis Dolgetta	6	1991 (2) and 1993 (4)
3	Carlos Maldonado	4	1989
4	Rafael Santana	3	1967
5	Antonio Ravelo	2	1967
5	Juan Arango	2	2007 and 2011
5	Gabriel Cichero	2	2007 and 2011
5	Miku	2	2011 and 2015
5	Josef Martínez	2	2016 and 2019
5	Darwin Machís	2	2019
5	Eduard Bello	2	2024
