= NorthEast United FC =

Association football club in Guwahati, India

NorthEast United
- Full name: NorthEast United Football Club
- Nickname: The Highlanders
- Short name: NEUFC
- Founded: 2014
- Ground: Indira Gandhi Athletic Stadium; Jawaharlal Nehru Stadium (Shillong)
- Capacity: 21,600; 15,100
- Owner(s): John Abraham; Jaya Balan; Dr. George John
- Chairperson: Priya Runchal
- Head coach: Juan Pedro Benali
- League: Indian Super League
- 2025–26: Indian Super League, 9th of 14
- Website: neutdfc.com
Home colours	Away colours

NorthEast United Football Club is an Indian professional football club based in Northeast India, that competes in the Indian Super League (ISL), the top flight of Indian football. The club was founded on 13 April 2014 during the inaugural season of Indian Super League. NorthEast United represents the 8 states of North East India, consisting of Assam, Nagaland, Manipur, Meghalaya, Sikkim, Arunachal Pradesh, Tripura and Mizoram.

== History ==
=== Formation ===
In early 2014, it was announced that the All India Football Federation, the national federation for football in India, and IMG-Reliance would be accepting bids for ownership of eight of nine selected cities for the upcoming Indian Super League, an eight-team franchise league modeled along the lines of the Indian Premier League cricket tournament. On 13 April 2014, it was announced that the Bollywood actor John Abraham and Shillong Lajong Football Club had won the bidding for the franchise.

On 16 July 2014, the club signed Joan Capdevila, a European Championship and World Cup winning defender with Spain, as its marquee player. He said: "India is a huge country and it should be a privilege for me to be a small part in popularizing this global game here and working with the young talented footballers of North East India".

On 19 August the club hired its first manager, New Zealander Ricki Herbert, who had represented his nation at the 1982 World Cup and managed New Zealand at the 2010 World Cup.

=== 2014 season: Inaugural season ===
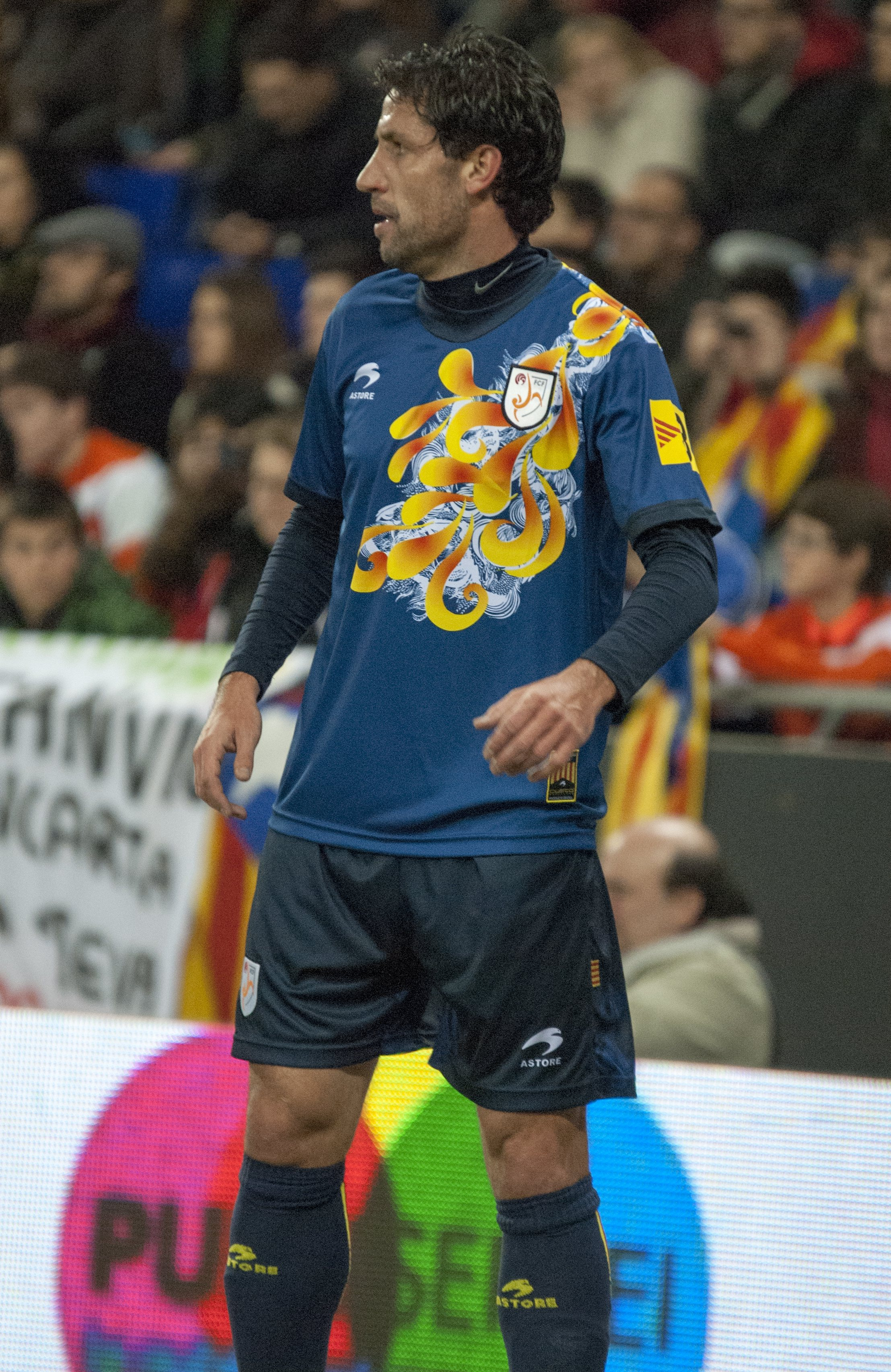
Spain international Joan Capdevila, club's first marquee player.

On 13 October 2014, the team won their first ISL match at the Indira Gandhi Stadium, with Spaniard Koke scoring the only goal of the game to defeat Kerala Blasters. The team did not make the end-of-season play-offs, finishing in last place among the eight teams.

=== 2015 season: Narrowly missed play-offs ===
For their second season, NorthEast United signed former Portugal international Simão Sabrosa as their new marquee signing. On 1 July 2015, the team announced their manager for the 2015 season, former Venezuela national coach, César Farías. The team lost all three of their opening matches with Simão absent through injury, but then earned a 2–0 home win over Chennaiyin FC in which the marquee player won and dispatched an added-time penalty kick to open the scoring. The club entered the top-four for semi-finals by the end of the season but lost their position to Chennaiyin, who defeated Pune City to gain 3 points and secure the spot.

=== 2016 season: Nelo Vingada, Velez, Alfaro era ===
On 13 May 2016, NorthEast United announced Sérgio Farias as the club's new manager. However, Farias joined his former club Suphanburi FC for a second stint forcing NorthEast United to look for a new coach. On 9 July 2016, NorthEast United officially announced Sérgio Farias' exit. On 23 July 2016, NorthEast United announced Nelo Vingada as the club's new manager. The club also appointed Francisco Bruto Da Costa as their assistant manager. The club again got a chance to enter the top-four for semi-finals if they defeat Kerala Blasters, but lost and hence, losing their semi-final chance. The club scored 14 goals and conceded 14 goals in that season. More than half of the goals (8) were scored by the South American duo Nicholas Velez and Emiliano Alfaro with 3 and 5 goals respectively.

=== 2017–18 season: A forgettable campaign ===
On 17 July 2017, in hope for a great season NorthEast United signed the young Portuguese manager Joao Carlos Pires de Deus. After playing its preseason games in Antalya, Turkey. The team began its season against the ISL debutants Jamshedpur FC. The game ended in a draw with neither side managing to find the back of the net despite NorthEast playing against a 10 men Jamshedpur in the last 20 minutes. Next they played Chennaiyin FC in Chennai, where they failed to keep the record of never losing in Chennai after losing 3–0. NorthEast witnessed their first win of the season where they defeated Delhi Dynamos 0–2 in the opponent's ground. The first goal of the match came from Marcinho in the 17th minute, when a cross by Halicharan Narzary from the left flank found him unmarked inside the box. The second goal came from the striker Danilo in the 22nd minute, when he pressured the Delhi custodian Albino Gomes and made him make error inside his own box, leaving an open goal for Danilo to score his first and last goal of the season and, 500th goal of the league. It was followed by a 4 match losing streak right after which the Portuguese manager was sacked. The team management brought in the ex-Chelsea boss Avram Grant as a technical advisor who acted as a caretaker manager in the absence of Joao. He was later promoted to head coach on 12 January 2018, after the team released an official statement about Joao's sacking. The team won 2 out of the first 3 games under Grant, where they defeated FC Goa 2–1 and Chennaiyin FC 3–1 at home. Seiminlen Doungel scored the first ever hat-trick for NorthEast United in that match. The team failed to win a single match after that, ending the season in a long 8 match winless streak in which they drew 1 match and lost all other matches. During the league season, they managed to win only 3 matches with a total score of 12, and they finished at the lowest position in the league points table. This had happened once before, in the inaugural season, but their score that time had been better. Thus, this was the worst season for the club in its existence.

On 19 February 2018, the All India Football Federation (AIFF) announced the Indian Super Cup as a replacement for the Federation Cup. It will be played between 16 teams, the top 6 teams of ISL and I-League and the remaining 4 will be picked through a qualifier played between the bottom 4 from both league. NorthEast United participated in the Cup Qualifiers for the 4 remaining spots. NorthEast United played their qualifier match against Gokulam Kerala on 15 March 2018 which they lost 2–0 and got eliminated.

=== 2018–19 season: Eelco Schatorrie era, maiden play-offs ===
2018-19 is the fifth season of the club's existence. The season started with a positive start under coach Eelco Schatorrie with NorthEast United drawing with Goa and two consecutive wins over ATK and defending champions Chennaiyin. Against Chennaiyin, NorthEast United made a thrilling comeback after down 3–1 in 35th minute to 3–3 in first half and winning the match 4–3. After Some thrilling victories against Kerala Blasters and Chennaiyan the club strengthened its way to the playoffs. After playing 17 matches and getting 28 points Northeast United finally qualified for the playoffs with Jamshedpur losing a chance to the playoffs with a draw against Chennaiyan FC and also for Super Cup. They lost the fewest matches and conceded the fewest goals of any team in the league. They also made a club record of 29 points. Former Nigerian international Bartholomew Ogbeche became the highest goalscorer of the club scoring 12 goals. NorthEast United became a major force in the league driven by the trio of Borges-Ogbeche-Gallego. They defeated Bengaluru in the first leg of semi-finals with 'Boot Jolokia' Mascia scoring in the dying moments in the game. Northeast United lost their second leg against Bengaluru which also saw Federico Gallego getting injured. The aggregate score was 4–2.

In the Super Cup, the team reached quarter-finals after fellow northeastern club NEROCA didn't play the match in round of 16 hence, giving them a walkover. In the quarter-finals, they lost to Chennaiyin by 1–2. After a successful season, the team was 'dismantled'. Head Coach Schattorie and top-scorer Ogbeche moving to Kerala Blasters, Borges moving to Mumbai City.

=== 2019–20 season ===
The club appointed Robert Jarni, as their head coach and also signed the Ghanaian legend Asamoah Gyan and Indian U17 youngsters Ninthoi Meetei and Lalengmawia. The season started well for the club and they managed to stay unbeaten for 6 games and on the top half of the table. But the club failed to carry on the momentum and remained winless for the rest of the season. The club also lost their scoring boots not managing to score in 6 matches out of 7 matches that followed and losing its Marquee striker Asamoah Gyan to an injury in the early half of the season. The head coach Robert Jarni was sacked in the later half of the season and replaced by assistant manager and head of academy Khalid Jamil. Robert Jarni managed his final match against Jamshedpur which ended in a 3–3 draw. The club failed to reach the play-offs, and were at 9th place at the end of the season.

=== 2020–22 season: Khalid Jamil era ===
The club appointed Gerard Nus, a Spanish manager as their head coach and also signed the Mauritanian international Khassa Camara, Ghanaian striker Kwesi Appiah and Belgian defender Benjamin Lambot. The club announced the retention of their star goalkeeper Subashish Roy and some local Indian players. They also retained Uruguayan midfielder Federico Gallego. They signed some Indian players including Rocharzella, Imran, Ashutosh Mehta and Gurjinder Kumar. They signed Luis Machado, Idrissa Sylla and Dylan Fox as their AFC player. The team played their first match of the season against Mumbai City and won it by 1-0 as Kwesi Appiah scored a penalty. The club parted ways with coach Gerard Nus after 11 matches in the ISL season. He was replaced by Khalid Jamil as interim head coach. Under Khalid, the club saw a nine match unbeaten run, which also helped in reaching the play-offs for second time in their history. On road to play-off, they also made a ten match unbeaten run, their longest ever. The club drew 1–1 with ATK Mohun Bagan in first leg of semi-final and lost the second leg 1–2, thus ending their campaign with 2–3 on aggregate and 11 game unbeaten run.

On 23 October 2021, Jamil was appointed as the head coach of NorthEast United, making him the first Indian permanent head coach of an ISL club. Under his guidance, NorthEast began its 2021–22 Indian Super League campaign on 20 November with a 4–2 loss to Bengaluru FC. NorthEast United FC had a forgetful 2021–22 season after the highs of the 2020–21 season. They had a sluggish start to the season as injuries and issues off the pitch dictated their on field performances. The ISL's first ever Indian head coach Khalid Jamil failed to live up to everyone's expectations as the Highlanders finished 10th on the league standings.

=== 2022–23 season ===
On 11 August 2022, NorthEast United announced the signing of Marco Balbul as their manager for the upcoming season. NorthEast United appointed Paul Groves and Floyd Pinto as their assistant manager for the upcoming season. On 8 December 2022, Vincenzo Alberto Annese joined NorthEast United as the new head coach after the club sacked Marco Balbul mid-season.

=== 2023–2025: Juan Pedro Benali era, the rise and first silverware ===
On 22 May 2023, NorthEast United appointed Juan Pedro Benali as the team's Head Coach on a 1+1 year deal. The highlight of the 2024-25 season came on August 31, 2024, when NorthEast United clinched their first Durand Cup title. In a thrilling final against Mohun Bagan SG, the match was decided by a penalty shootout, with NorthEast United emerging victorious. This was the first major silverware win in the club's history. In the ongoing Indian Super League, NorthEast United has demonstrated a mix of results. A standout performance was their commanding 5–0 victory over Jamshedpur FC on October 26, 2024, marking their biggest win in ISL history.

In the 2025 Durand Cup, NorthEast United had a campaign—starting with a strong 3-1 win over Malaysian Armed Forces where Alaaeddine Ajaraie scored a hat-trick. They followed up with performances (including a 4-0 win over Bodoland FC in the quarterfinals) and reached the final by defeating Shillong Lajong 1-0 in the semis. In the final, they thrashed debutants Diamond Harbour FC 6-1—becoming the first team in over three decades to defend the Durand Cup—with six different goalscorers and a commanding display of depth.

=== 2026–present ===
The 2025–26 Indian Super League season started late due to the expiration of the rights agreement between FSDL and AIFF. NorthEast United lost their first match 0–3 against East Bengal, followed by three consecutive draws. They secured their first home victory in Guwahati in over 400 days with a 2–1 win against Jamshedpur. The club also paid tribute to Zubeen Garg, who had passed away six months earlier. In their subsequent match against Odisha, the team printed the names of several prominent athletes, including Olympic medalists and former footballers from the region, to raise awareness against identity–based discrimination faced by people from Northeast India.

== Crest, colors and kits ==
The crest of NorthEast United FC is featured with 8 stars at the top representing each state of Northeast India. The crest is designed with red, black and white applications, with the club name written in bold letters between the main crest and the stars. The club changed the crest with an entirely gold crest for its third season of ISL. It was changed back to the original color after the end of the season.

=== Kit manufacturers and shirt sponsors ===
Period	Kit manufacturer	Shirt sponsor	Back sponsor
2014–15	Adidas	HTC	
2015–16	Performax	HTC	
2016–17	Performax	HTC	Payism
2017–18	Performax	McDowell's No.1	Jio
2018–19	Performax	McDowell's No.1	GNC
2019–20	Performax	Federal Bank	Stihl
2020–21	Performax	JA Entertainment	Stihl
2021–22	SIX5SIX	Amrit Cement	
2022–23	SIX5SIX	Meghalaya Tourism	Parcos
2023–24	Trak-Only	Meghalaya Tourism	IndianOil
2024–25	Trak-Only	Meghalaya Tourism	Coal India
2025–27	Reebok	Meghalaya Tourism	Coal India

=== Kit evolution ===
2014-15	2015-16	2016–18	2018–19	2019–21

2021–22	2022–23	2023–24	2024–25	2025–26

== Stadium ==
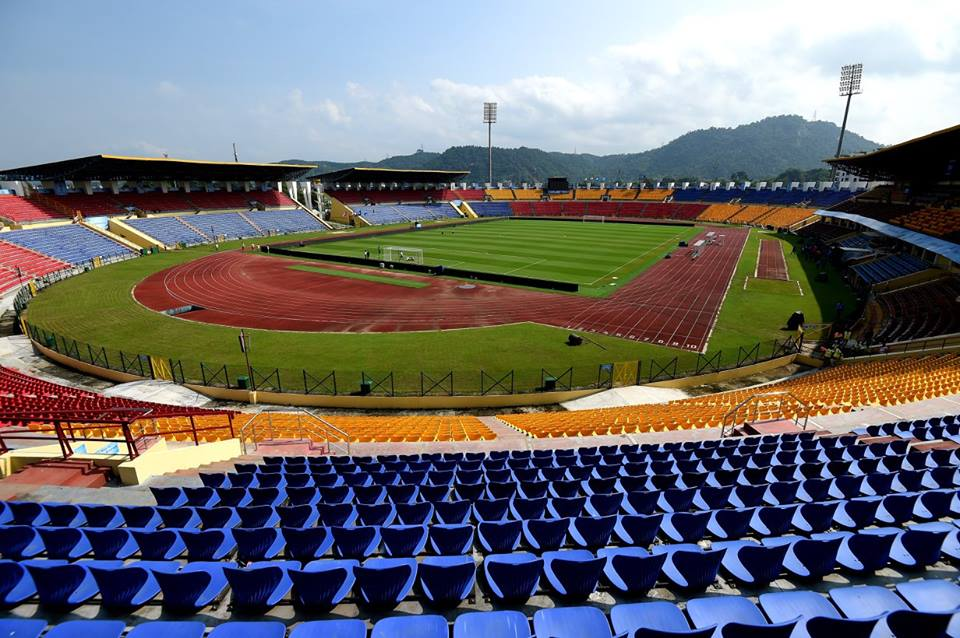
Indira Gandhi Athletic Stadium in Guwahati, Assam, home of NorthEast United.

NorthEast United FC plays their home matches at the Indira Gandhi Athletic Stadium, Guwahati. In 2014, to meet FIFA regulations, the stadium was renovated and its capacity was increased from 12,000 to 35,000. Indira Gandhi Athletic Stadium hosted the opening ceremony of ISL 2016.

NorthEast had the highest attendance on 20 October 2016, when a record attendance of 32,844 turned up to witness the match between NorthEast United and Chennaiyin FC. The capacity was again reduced to 23,850 after the installation of bucket seats for the 2017 FIFA U-17 World Cup. The stadium saw the lowest attendance in the history of ISL when only 361 fans turned up to witness the match played between NorthEast United and FC Goa on 15 January 2023.

From 2020 to 2022, due to COVID-19 pandemic, all the games were played in the state of Goa. NorthEast played their home games at Tilak Maidan Stadium, Vasco da Gama for 2020–21 season and Fatorda Stadium, Margao for 2021–22 season.

During the 2024–25 season, NorthEast played their last three home games in the Jawaharlal Nehru Stadium, Shillong, Meghalaya.

== Supporters ==
The unofficial supporters group of the club is "Highlander Brigade". The fan club can be traced back to its roots where it was merely a WhatsApp group formed out of a handful of followers of a Facebook page "NorthEast United FC Fans". They not only support NorthEast United but also support the Indian team.

Before the fourth season of the Indian Super League, keeping an eye on the occasion, a major chunk of the group members decided to meet and attempt to do something big. And under the tutelage of key members helming certain responsibilities, the Brigade grew and spread out rapidly.

The Highlander Brigade host football-related events in the city. To ensure that the football culture remains proactive in the city, the brigade plans to indulge in more fan activities in the future as well.

== Players ==
=== First-team squad ===
As of 31 August 2026

Note: Flags indicate national team as defined under FIFA eligibility rules; some limited exceptions apply. Players may hold more than one non-FIFA nationality.

No.	Pos.	Nation	Player
1	GK	IND	Gurmeet Singh
2	DF	IND	Dinesh Singh Soraisham
3	DF	IND	Tondonba Singh Ngasepam
4	DF	IND	Pramveer Singh
7	MF	IND	Abdul Rabeeh
8	MF	ESP	Antonio Moyano
9	FW	ESP	Ethyan González
10	MF	SRB	Nikola Ninković
11	FW	IND	Parthib Gogoi
12	DF	IND	Asheer Akhtar
13	MF	IND	Mayakkannan Muthu
14	FW	MAR	Alaeddine Ajaraie
15	MF	IND	Macarton Nickson
18	FW	IND	Lalrinzuala Lalbiaknia

No.	Pos.	Nation	Player
19	DF	ESP	Eneko Satrústegui
20	GK	IND	Dipesh Chauhan
21	DF	IND	Robin Yadav
22	MF	IND	Redeem Tlang
29	MF	IND	Mohammed Arshaf
30	MF	IND	Danny Meitei Laishram
35	GK	IND	Arman Tamang
77	DF	IND	Buanthanglun Samte
80	FW	IND	Jithin MS
—	GK	IND	Mohanraj K
—	DF	IND	Mark Zothanpuia
—	DF	IND	Nikhil Barla
27	FW	IND	Aman CK

=== Out on loan ===
Note: Flags indicate national team as defined under FIFA eligibility rules; some limited exceptions apply. Players may hold more than one non-FIFA nationality.

No.	Pos.	Nation	Player
—	FW	IND	Lalbiakdika Vanlalvunga (at Sreenidi Deccan until 31 May 2027)
—	MF	IND	Bekey Oram (at Samaleswari until 31 May 2027)

No.	Pos.	Nation	Player
—	FW	IND	Ankith Padmanabhan (at Samaleswari until 31 May 2027)
—	FW	IND	Fredy Chawngthansanga (at Samaleswari until 31 May 2027)

== Ownership ==
NorthEast United is owned by John Abraham, who is an Indian Bollywood actor, producer and former model. They also have Jaya Balan, a perfume businessman as their partner and co-owner.

The consortium that bid for the franchise also included then Meghalaya based I-League club Shillong Lajong FC and their owner Larsingh Ming Sawyan, and Guwahati-based businessman Sanjiv Narain. Sanjiv Narain exited before the start of the first season, while Shillong Lajong exited the partnership by the end of second season.

During his younger days, John had an ambition for playing football for India before becoming an actor. When he got the opportunity for investing in a football club during the formation of ISL, instead of investing in his hometown of Mumbai, he invested in Northeast India, a football hotbed in the country. His wife Priya Runchal is the chairperson of the club.

== Personnel ==
=== Management ===
Position	Name	Refs.
Owner(s)	(India) John Abraham (90%) (India) Jaya Balan (5%) (India) Dr. George John (5%)	
Chairperson	(United States) Priya Runchal	
CEO	(India) Mandar Tamhane	
Head of Academy	(India) Naushad Moosa	
Senior Manager	(India) Shahashad Muhammed	
Lead, Operations	(India) Rohit Thorat	
Lead, Strategy & Operations	(India) Rajat Bhakare	

=== Current technical staff ===
As of 1 July 2025

Position	Name	Refs.
Head coach	(Spain) Juan Pedro Benali	
Assistant coach	(Spain) Sergio Sesi	
Assistant coach	(India) Naushad Moosa	
Goalkeeping coach	(Spain) Manuel Diez Aznar	
Strength and Conditioning coach	(Spain) Javier Caballero	
Team analyst	(India) Amogh Adige	
Physiotherapists	(India) Kapil Sharma (India) Dileep Kumar Jagadesan (India) Sony Chittilappilly Sunny	
Club doctor	(India) Dr Abhinav	
Reserves and U-18 head coach	(India) Naushad Moosa	

== Reserves and academy ==
Note: Flags indicate national team as defined under FIFA eligibility rules; some limited exceptions apply. Players may hold more than one non-FIFA nationality.

No.	Pos.	Nation	Player
1	GK	IND	Khoirom Jackson Singh
2	DF	IND	Joni Rabha
4	DF	IND	Sampow Rongmei
5	DF	IND	Lanchenba Maibam
6	MF	IND	Basanta Boro
8	MF	IND	Denis Bodo
9	FW	IND	Dipu Mirdha
10	MF	IND	Muktasana Gotimayum
11	MF	IND	Madhujya Bora
12	FW	IND	Alfred Lalroutsang
14	MF	IND	Ningthoujam Binan Singh

No.	Pos.	Nation	Player
16	DF	IND	Chiranjeet Gogoi
17	DF	IND	Bimol Singh
19	DF	IND	Bishnu Rabha
20	MF	IND	Anupam Borgohain
27	MF	IND	Sandeep Thapa
28	DF	IND	Jirjar Terang
36	FW	IND	Jwangbla Brahma
—	MF	IND	Pragyan Medhi
—	MF	IND	Laishram Danny Meitei
—	DF	IND	Mukul Panwar

=== Statistics and records ===
==== Season-by-season ====
As of 17 July 2022

Season	GSA C Division									Top Scorer	
Season	P	W	D	L	GF	GA	Pts	Position	Playoffs	Player	Goals
2022	4	4	0	0	33	1	12	1st (Group B)	Champions	(India) Jitu Ahmed	6

== Women's team ==
The club also has a women's team that competes in the Indian Women's League 2 (IWL 2).

== Honours ==
=== Domestic ===
- Durand Cup
  - Winners (2): 2024, 2025
- Sikkim Gold Cup
  - Winners (1): 2024
- Bordoloi Trophy
  - Runners-up (1): 2025

== Esports ==
The organizers of ISL introduced eISL, a FIFA video game tournament, for the ISL playing clubs, each represented by two players. NorthEast United FC hosted a series of qualifying games for all the participants wanting to represent the club in eISL. NorthEast United FC’s Saransh Jain and Emaad Jameel Ahmed won the second season of the eISL after defeating Bengaluru FC’s Sagnik Banerjee and Charanjot Singh 2–1 in the finals.

=== Roster ===
NorthEast United eSports FIFA roster
Players
Coaches

Handle	Name	Nationality
Emaadrox	Ahmed, Emaad Jameel	India
saranshjain12	Jain, Saransh	India

Head coach

George Cork

Legend:
- (I) Inactive
- (S) Suspended
- Substitute
- (injured) Injury / Illness

Latest roster transaction: 27 April 2023.

=== Honours ===
==== E-ISL ====
- Champions: 2023, 2024

== See also ==
- List of NorthEast United FC managers
- List of NorthEast United FC players
- List of NorthEast United FC records and statistics
- List of NorthEast United FC seasons
- List of football clubs in India
