= Selorm Geraldo =

Ghanaian footballer

Personal information
- Date of birth: 23 June 1996 (age 30)
- Place of birth: Ghana
- Height: 1.70 m (5 ft 7 in)
- Position: Forward

Youth career
- Red Bull Ghana

Senior career*
Years	Team	Apps	(Gls)
2013-2014	Liberty Professionals	20	(6)
2013	Al-Ahli Tripoli	15	(6)
2015-2017	BA Stars F.C.	14	(4)
2017-2018	Golden Kicks	16	(9)
2018-2019	TP Mazembe	0	(0)
2019-	CS Don Bosco	13	(1)
- * Club domestic league appearances and goals

Selorm Geraldo (born June 23, 1996, in Ghana) is a Ghanaian footballer who plays for CS Don Bosco in the DR Congolese Linafoot.

== Career ==
Geraldo began his soccer career at Redbull Ghana. He joined Liberty Professionals 2013 and scored a match winner against Real Tamale United on March 3, 2013.

Joined Al-Ahli Tripoli on a three-year deal August 7, 2013.

He later moved to BA Stars F.C. in the winter.

Just a season at Golden Kicks, he joined TP Mazembe in August 2019 but was loaned to satellite club CS Don Bosco.

== International career ==
Whilst playing domestic football in Ghana, Selorm represented Ghana U20
