= Gerard Nus =

Spanish association football manager

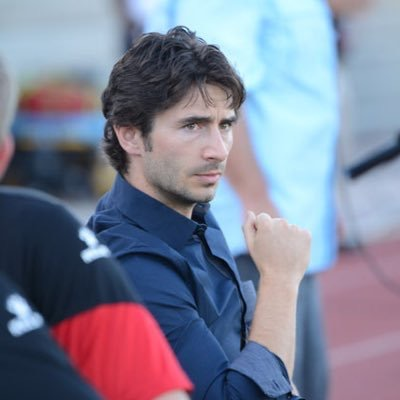
- Nus on the touchline for Rayo OKC in 2016

Personal information
- Full name: Gerard Nus Casanova
- Date of birth: 31 January 1985 (age 41)
- Place of birth: Tarragona, Spain

Team information
- Current team: Paju Frontier (manager from 2026)

Managerial career
- Years: Team
- 2007–2010: Liverpool (academy)
- 2010–2011: Chunnam Dragons (assistant)
- 2012–2013: Brighton & Hove Albion (academy)
- 2013–2014: Melbourne Heart (assistant)
- 2014–2017: Ghana (assistant)
- 2015–2016: Elche (technical director)
- 2016–2017: Rayo Vallecano (technical director)
- 2016: Rayo OKC
- 2017–2018: Irtysh Pavlodar
- 2018–2019: Eskilstuna (technical director)
- 2020–2021: NorthEast United
- 2022–2024: Greece (assistant)
- 2025: Al-Gharafa SC (youth director)
- 2026–: Paju Frontier

Gerard Nus Casanova (born 31 January 1985) is a Spanish UEFA Pro license football manager, who is manager of the Paju Frontier from 2026 season.

After retiring as a player at a young age and completing a Sports Science Degree at INEFC Lleida, Nus started his coaching career at Liverpool's academy. After his first year, he was promoted to Rafael Benítez's coaching staff, ending the 2008–09 Premier League season in second place and advancing to the quarterfinals of the FA Cup and the UEFA Champions League.

After his time in England and with the end of Benitez's period in Liverpool, Nus moved to the K League with the Chunnam Dragons, where he was appointed as assistant coach under Jung Hae Soung. During his year in South Korea, the team finished the league season in seventh place and advanced to the quarterfinals of the FA Cup and the Rush Cup.

In addition, he has worked with Brighton & Hove Albion (English Premier League), Melbourne Heart (A-League), Ghana National Football Team (Africa), Elche (La Liga), Rayo Vallecano (La Liga Smartbank), Rayo OKC (NASL), Irtysh Pavlodar (Kazakhstan Premier League), and Eskilstuna (Allsvenskan).

== Early career and education ==
Nus' football journey began at age 14 as an assistant coach at Espanyol's training camps. By 16, he had Level 1 and 2 coaching certificates. At 18, he started a Sports Science degree. At 22, he secured his Level 3 coaching certificate (equivalent to UEFA Pro license) in Huesca, Spain. An ankle injury ended his playing career at Reus Deportiu, leading him to focus solely on coaching. At 21, he became assistant coach at Gimnàstic de Tarragona for the under-19 team.

=== Liverpool and international experiences ===
In 2007, Nus decided to move to England to work as a youth coach at the academy of Liverpool. One year later, Nus was promoted to the first team coaching staff, where he worked under the guidance of Rafael Benítez. On 18 March 2009, the team registered a 4–0 victory over Real Madrid. The 2008–09 season was a successful campaign for Liverpool, ending in second place in the Premier League and advancing to the quarter-finals of the FA Cup and the UEFA Champions League. During this experience, Nus had the opportunity to work with world-renowned players such as Steven Gerrard, Javier Mascherano, Xabi Alonso and Pepe Reina.

=== Chunnam Dragons ===
After three years in the UK, Nus moved to Asia to work for the Chunnam Dragons in the top-tier division of the South Korea K League. He was appointed as the assistant coach of Jung Hae-seong. During the 2011-12 campaign, Nus was able to coach players such as Ji Dong-won, who later signed with Sunderland, and Yun Suk-young, who signed for Queens Park Rangers.

=== Brighton & Hove Albion ===
The following season (2012–13), Nus was appointed as head of academy coaching at Brighton & Hove Albion, where he oversaw the development of the club's young players and played a role in the process of promoting players to the first team, which was managed by Gus Poyet.

=== Melbourne Heart ===
In 2013, Nus decided to join John Aloisi's coaching staff at Melbourne Heart – currently named Melbourne City. Nus' integration to the A-League was facilitated by his relationship with Aloisi, who previously played for two La Liga teams, Osasuna and Deportivo Alaves. The 2013–14 season did not start upright for Melbourne Heart, and on 28 December 2013, Aloisi was sacked as the team manager after having played only 10 games. The technical director, John Van’t Schip, took charge of the team and Nus was automatically promoted to first assistant coach.

At the conclusion of the campaign, Nus rejected the club's offer to renew his contract, ending his time in Australia.

=== Ghana national team ===
In December 2014, Nus was appointed as assistant coach at the Ghana Football Association with the main goal to prepare the 2015 Africa Cup of Nations, the 30th staging organized by the Confederation of African Football (CAF) in Equatorial Guinea.

On 19 January 2015, Ghana started the tournament with a loss against Senegal. However, the team managed to beat Algeria 1–0 on 23 January and South Africa 2–1. Ghana advanced to the knockout stage in first position. The Black Stars were able to comfortably defeat Guinea. Ghana played Equatorial Guinea for a place in the final. The match was played at Estadio de Malabo and the final score was a 3–0 victory. On 8 February 2015, the final ended goalless. Following extra time and after a 9-8 penalty shoot-out, Ivory Coast defeated Ghana.

Nus also oversaw the development of the Black Stars and the future generations of the country. In March 2015, Nus travelled to Senegal to supervise the 20th edition of the biennial international youth football tournament, 2015 African U-20 Championship, organized by the Confederation of African Football (CAF) for players aged 20 and below. Ghana lost in the semi-finals of the tournament but qualified for the 2015 FIFA U-20 World Cup.

Nus decided to stay as assistant coach of the Black Stars to compete at the 2017 Africa Cup of Nations, which was the 31st edition of the tournament, and was hosted by Gabon. This event was also part of the Africa Cup of Nations 60th Anniversary. Nus' team advanced to the knockout stage, and was able to fight for a final spot with Cameroon. On February 2 the Black Stars were defeated 2-0 by the tournament winners, Cameroon; ending the competition in fourth position. After more than two years with the Ghana national team, Nus decided to not renew his contract with the country's federation.

=== Elche ===
In the summer of 2015, Nus was appointed as a technical director of Elche in La Liga, and worked under the supervision of sporting director Ramon Planes. This new role allowed Nus to continue with his position as assistant coach of the national team of Ghana. At Elche, Nus built a pathway to link the youth teams with the first team. Also, he oversaw the training sessions of the first team, assisted in the scouting procedures and helped in the creation of the 15/16 squad. Elche finished the 14/15 campaign with enough points to remain in La Liga. However, off the field issues and the important economic crisis that the club faced, forced the team to drop to a lower division. As a result, many players decided to leave the club. With a limited budget, Elche were however competitive and fought to get into playoff positions during the season.

The club created a specific area of sports performance and detailed training, controlled and monitored by Nus. This new section of the club was designed to allow all the players of the club, from the academy teams to the development squad – under 23 –, to improve the fundamental areas of their game and monitor their constant progress.

On summer 2016, with the conclusion of the season and the consequent departure of Ramon Planes to Rayo Vallecano, Nus did not sign a new contract and moved to Madrid, where he was appointed as the new technical director of Rayo Vallecano.

=== Rayo Vallecano ===
In July 2016, Nus was hired by Rayo Vallecano as deputy technical director, to assist sporting director Ramon Planes. At Rayo Vallecano, Nus faced similar circumstances as in Elche, as the club was relegated to the Segunda División after finishing 18th in the 2015–16 La Liga season. Rayo's first season back in the Segunda Division was difficult, and the team ended in 12th position. At the start of the 2017–18 season, the club appointed David Cobeño as the new sporting director, with the consequent departure of Ramon Planes.

With the club's goal to build a roster to return to La Liga, Nus decided to remain at the club and played an important role designing the 17/18 squad, with players such as Fran Beltrán, Roberto Trashorras, Óscar Trejo, Bebé, Adrián Embarba, Raúl de Tomás and Unai López. Rayo secured their return to La Liga with a 1–0 victory over Lugo on the 41st game of the season.

=== Rayo OKC ===
In August 2016, Nus was named head coach of Rayo Oklahoma City, a football club owned by Rayo Vallecano. The team based in Oklahoma City, joined the North American Soccer League – the second tier of the American soccer pyramid. They were able to achieve the NASL Championship semifinal after a ten-game unbeaten run with five straight wins.

On November 7, 2016, following the conclusion of the 2016 NASL playoffs, Nus stepped down and returned to Spain to continue his role as technical director for Rayo Vallecano. A few months later, the American club ceased operations due to the instability of the league.

=== Irtysh Pavlodar ===
On 21 December 2017, Nus was appointed as the new manager of Irtysh Pavlodar on a two-year contract. On 28 April 2018, with the club in the middle of the table, Nus and Irtysh Pavlodar announced that they had mutually agreed to part ways.

=== Eskilstuna ===
Just a few months later, Nus was appointed as the technical director of Eskilstuna in the Allsvenskan, the Swedish top-tier division. His main goal was to oversee the development of the club and establish the key fundamentals of the team. In addition, Nus created a structure from the academy to the first team to assist the development of young players.

=== NorthEast United ===
On 25 August 2020, Nus was appointed as the new manager of Indian Super League side NorthEast United, a professional football club based in Guwahati, Assam, that competes in the top tier league of India. The club signed the Mauritian international Khassa Camara, Ghanaian striker Kwesi Appiah, Belgium defender Benjamin Lambot, Australian Dylan Fox and Guinean Idrissa Sylla.

With the appointment of the Spanish manager, the club went on a 6-game unbeaten run. In addition, the team was able to defeat Mumbai City– owned by the Football City group – in their opening game of the 2020/21 season by 1–0, as Kwesi Appiah scored his first goal of the campaign. NorthEast United parted ways with Nus after eleven matches in charge and the club three points off the playoff positions.

== Others ==
=== Efficiency Match Sports ===
Gerard Nus is the co-founder of Efficiency Match Sports, software designed to organize training sessions, manage teams, create animations, control data and scout players.

=== TV3 ===
Nus has worked for the Catalan TV (Esports 3 / TV3), analysing the Barcelona games from La Liga and the Champions League.

== Managerial career ==
On 22 October 2025, Nus announce official manager of Paju Frontier from 2026 season for participating in K League 2 marking return to South Korea after 14 years.

== Managerial statistics ==
=== Managerial record ===
As of the start from 2026 season.

Managerial record by team and tenure
Team	From	To	Record					Ref
Team	From	To	P	W	D	L	Win %	Ref
Rayo OKC	1 August 2016	7 November 2016	16	6	5	5	37.5	
Irtysh Pavlodar	21 December 2017	28 April 2018	7	3	1	3	42.9	2018 Season
NorthEast United	1 September 2020	12 January 2021	11	2	6	3	18.2	2020–21 season
Paju Frontier	22 October 2025	present	0	0	0	0	—	2026 season
Total			34	11	12	11	32.4	—
