= Marco Balbul =

Israeli footballer and manager

Marco Balbul מרקו בלבול
Personal information
- Date of birth: 13 July 1967 (age 59)
- Place of birth: Tirat Carmel, Israel
- Height: 1.79 m (5 ft 10 in)
- Position: Defender

Youth career
- –1986: Maccabi Haifa

Senior career*
Years	Team	Apps	(Gls)
1986–1998	Maccabi Haifa	213	(2)
1998–2000	Maccabi Tel Aviv	43	(0)
2000–2002	Maccabi Haifa	3	(0)
Total		259	(2)

International career
1990–1995	Israel	9	(0)

Managerial career
- 2002–2003: Maccabi Haifa (assistant)
- 2006: Maccabi Netanya (assistant)
- 2007–2008: Hapoel Be'er Sheva
- 2008–2009: Maccabi Tel Aviv (assistant)
- 2009–2010: Bnei Sakhnin
- 2011: Maccabi Petah Tikva
- 2012: Partizan (assistant)
- 2013–2014: Bnei Sakhnin
- 2014: BEC Tero Sasana (assistant)
- 2014–2015: Maccabi Haifa
- 2016–2018: Israel U21
- 2018–2020: Maccabi Haifa
- 2022: NorthEast United
- 2023–2024: Zambia (assistant)
- 2024–: Maccabi Netanya
- * Club domestic league appearances and goals

Marco Balbul (Hebrew: מרקו בלבול; born 13 July 1967) is an Israeli football manager and former player who is the coach of Maccabi Netanya.

== Early life ==
Balbul was born in Tirat Carmel, Israel as the youngest child of Egyptian Jews immigrant parents who immigrated from Egypt to Israel in the 50s. Aged 9, he was accepted to the youth system of Maccabi Haifa.

== Playing career ==
Babul made his first team debut for Maccabi Haifa in 1986. Spending most of his career at the club, he won several honours including the Israeli Premier League and the Israel State Cup.

He made his Israel national team debut against Greece in 1990. He has 5 appearance in the UEFA Euro 1996 qualifying.

== Managerial career ==
On 28 December 2014, Balbul was appointed the new manager of Maccabi Haifa, replacing Aleksandar Stanojević who resigned from the job.

On 11 August 2022, Balbul was announced as the head coach of Indian Super League club NorthEast United. But on 8 December 2022 he was sacked after the club failed to register a single win in the league. He is currently third assistant coach for the Zambia National team.

== Honours ==
=== Player ===
Maccabi Haifa

- Israeli Premier League: 1988–89, 1990–91, 1993–94
- State Cup: 1991, 1993, 1995

=== Manager ===
Maccabi Haifa

- Israeli Premier League runner-up: 2018–19, 2019–20
- Toto Cup runner-up: 2014–15
