= João de Deus (footballer) =

Portuguese footballer and manager

Personal information
- Full name: João Carlos Pires de Deus
- Date of birth: 6 November 1976 (age 49)
- Place of birth: Setúbal, Portugal
- Height: 1.80 m (5 ft 11 in)
- Position: Left back

Team information
- Current team: Portugal FC (assistant)

Youth career
- 1991–1992: Pelezinhos
- 1992–1995: Vitória Setúbal

Senior career*
Years	Team	Apps	(Gls)
1995–1996	Vitória Setúbal	0	(0)
1996–1997	Desportivo Beja	9	(0)
1997–1998	Seixal	16	(0)
1998–1999	Estoril	6	(0)
1999–2001	Lusitano Évora	34	(0)
2001–2003	Barreirense	64	(2)
2003–2004	Vitória Setúbal	8	(0)
Total		137	(2)

Managerial career
- 2008–2010: Cape Verde
- 2010: Ceuta
- 2010–2011: Farense
- 2011–2012: Atlético
- 2012–2013: Oliveirense
- 2013–2014: Gil Vicente
- 2014–2017: Sporting B
- 2017: Nacional
- 2017–2018: NorthEast United
- 2018: Ermis
- 2018–2019: Al-Hilal (assistant)
- 2019–2020: Flamengo (assistant)
- 2019: Flamengo (interim)
- 2020–2021: Benfica (assistant)
- 2022–2023: Fenerbahçe (assistant)
- 2023–2025: Al-Hilal (assistant)
- 2026-: Portugal FC (assistant)
- * Club domestic league appearances and goals

João Carlos Pires de Deus (born 6 November 1976) is a Portuguese retired footballer who played as a left back, and a manager. He is currently assistant manager of Portugal National football team.

Having played no higher than the second tier, he began managing at age 31 with the Cape Verde national team. He led Gil Vicente and Nacional in the Primeira Liga and was assistant to Jorge Jesus at several clubs.

== Playing career ==
Born in Setúbal, de Deus spent several years associated to local Vitória Futebol Clube, joining its youth system at the age of 15 and making his senior debut in 1995.

During his nine-year senior career, he never competed in higher than the second tier, and represented C.D. Beja, Seixal FC, Lusitano G.C. and F.C. Barreirense, before retiring with his first club Vitória at the end of the 2003–04 season, at only 27.

== Coaching career ==
De Deus started working as a coach immediately after retiring, working with Vitória de Setúbal in the fitness department under José Couceiro and José Rachão; he also had a spell with G.D. Interclube in Angola, again as a fitness coach. His first job as a manager was with the Cape Verde national team, which he left after an unsuccessful qualification campaign for the 2010 FIFA World Cup; shortly before the tournament, he led the team to a goalless friendly draw against Portugal in Covilhã.

In the summer of 2010, and without permission from the Cape Verdean Football Federation, de Deus was appointed at Segunda División B club AD Ceuta. He was sacked by the Spaniards before the end of the year, however, returning to Portugal and joining S.C. Farense, which he could not prevent from being relegated from the third level in spite of an incredible comeback.

From 2011 to 2013, de Deus worked in Portugal's second tier, with Atlético Clube de Portugal and U.D. Oliveirense. For the 2013–14 campaign he was appointed at Gil Vicente FC, thus making his debut in the Primeira Liga.

After a poor start to 2014–15, which saw the team lose the first three league matches, de Deus was relieved of his duties. On 6 October, he was hired by Sporting CP B on a one-year contract with the option of a second. He was sacked on 15 February 2017, after a 2–1 home loss to Varzim S.C. put the reserves into second-last place.

On 21 March 2017, de Deus returned to the top flight with C.D. Nacional, becoming the third manager of the season for the last-placed side. He left on 24 May, after their relegation in the same position.

De Deus was hired at Indian Super League franchise NorthEast United FC on 17 July 2017. The team from Guwahati dismissed him the following 2 January, having won once and scored twice in seven games.

Having already assisted him at Al Hilal SFC in Saudi Arabia, de Deus was one of six compatriots that Portuguese manager Jorge Jesus named in his staff at Brazilian club Clube de Regatas do Flamengo in June 2019, being appointed assistant along with Tiago Oliveira. In November, as Jesus was suspended, he led the team in the 3–1 home win against Esporte Clube Bahia for the Série A as an interim, being chosen the round's best coach.

De Deus followed Jesus to S.L. Benfica in 2020; the following 28 January he covered the ill manager's absence in a 3–1 home win over B-SAD in the quarter-finals of the Taça de Portugal. In 2022, they moved to Fenerbahçe SK.

On July 1, 2023, Al-Hilal announced the reappointment of Jorge Jesus as their manager for the 2023–24 season. The coach's staff members, including João de Deus, accompanied the coach in his return to the Arab team.

== Managerial statistics ==
As of match played 1 December 2019

Managerial record by team and tenure
Team	Period	Record							
Team	Period	P	W	D	L	GF	GA	GD	Win %
Cape Verde	2008–10	11	6	2	3	16	10	+6	54.55
(Spain) Ceuta	2010	2	0	0	2	1	7	−6	0.00
(Portugal) Farense	2010–11	17	7	5	5	19	22	−3	41.18
(Portugal) Atlético	2011–12	24	8	8	8	21	25	−4	33.33
(Portugal) Oliveirense	2012–13	49	19	13	17	61	56	+5	38.78
(Portugal) Gil Vicente	2013–14	41	10	11	20	36	55	−19	24.39
(Portugal) Sporting B	2014–17	110	43	27	40	149	153	−4	39.09
(Portugal) Nacional	2017	8	1	1	6	5	15	−10	12.50
(India) NorthEast United	2017–18	8	2	1	5	4	13	−9	25.00
(Cyprus) Ermis	2018	8	1	2	5	10	14	−4	12.50
(Brazil) Flamengo (interim)	2019	1	1	0	0	3	1	+2	100.00
Total		280	99	70	111	328	372	−44	35.36
