= Juan Pedro Benali =

Spanish footballer and manager (born 1969)

Personal information
- Full name: Juan Pedro Benali Hammou
- Date of birth: 25 March 1969 (age 57)
- Place of birth: Madrid, Spain

Team information
- Current team: NorthEast United (head coach)

Managerial career
- Years: Team
- 1997–1998: Las Rozas
- 1998–1999: Ittihad Khemisset
- 1999–2000: SCC Mohammédia
- 2000–2001: Al-Gharafa
- 2001–2002: CO Transports
- 2002–2003: Sharjah
- 2003–2005: Al-Khaleej
- 2006–2014: Vissel Kobe (assistant)
- 2017–2018: Chabab Rif Al Hoceima
- 2018–2019: Chabab Rif Al Hoceima
- 2020–2021: Ittihad Tanger
- 2021–2022: RS Berkane
- 2022–2023: Ittihad Tanger
- 2023–: NorthEast United

Juan Pedro Benali Hammou (born 25 March 1969) is a Spanish professional football manager and executive who is the currently the head coach of Indian Super League club NorthEast United.

He spent his managerial and football executive careers in Spain, Morocco, Qatar, Tunisia, the UAE, Japan, Finland and India.

== Career ==
Benali made his coaching debut at Madrid-based club Las Rozas in 1997. In 1999, he joined Atlético Madrid as a technical assistant to Claudio Ranieri. From 2000 to 2001, he managed Ittihad Khemisset and SCC Mohammédia in the Moroccan top tier.

In 2001, Benali joined Al-Gharafa in Qatar. After a short stint with CO Transports in Tunisia, he joined UAE Football League club Sharjah FC in 2001. He won the 2002–2003 UAE President's Cup with the club. In 2003, Benali joined Al-Khaleej Sports & Cultural Club and continued with the club till 2005.

In 2006, Benali joined Japanese club Vissel Kobe as an assistant to Stuart Baxter. He served as a technical assistant at Racing de Santander from 2007 to 2008. Later he joined the coaching team of Baxter with the Finland national team until 2009. From 2009 to 2011, he served as the CEO of Maghreb de Fès in Morocco and director of football at Al Dhafra in the UAE. He oversaw the Spanish Sports Academy in the UAE from 2010 to 2014. Later, he headed the La Manga Club high performance soccer centre for two years.

In 2016, Benali returned to Morocco as the sporting director of Botola club Moghreb Tétouan. Between 2017 and 2019, he served as the manager of Chabab Rif Al Hoceima in two stints. Later, until 2020, he had a short stint as the sporting director of Moghreb Tétouan again.

In January 2020, Benali was appointed as the manager of Botola club Ittihad Tanger and remained in charge until the end of the 2019–20 season.

On 18 March 2021, Benali was appointed as the manager of Botola club RS Berkane. He was sacked on 23 June after a loss against Wydad AC

On 18 April 2022, Benali was shortly re-appointed as the manager of Ittihad Tanger.

=== NorthEast United ===
On 22 May 2023, Benali was appointed as the head coach of Indian Super League club NorthEast United on a one-year deal with an option to extend for another year. He led NorthEast to the semifinals of the 2023 Durand Cup but lost to East Bengal on penalties. On 3 January 2024, NorthEast United extended his contract until the end of the 2024–25 season with an option to extend for a further season.

==== 2024 Durand Cup ====
On 31 August 2024, NorthEast defeated Mohun Bagan SG 4–3 on penalties in the 2024 Durand Cup final. Benali became the first head coach to win a major trophy for the club.

== Personal life ==
Born in Spain, Benali is of Spanish-Moroccan descent.

== Managerial statistics ==
As of match played 23 August 2025

Managerial record by team and tenure
Team	From	To	Record					Ref.
Team	From	To	M	W	D	L	Win %	Ref.
Chabab Rif Al Hoceima	1 July 2017	1 February 2018	15	5	6	4	33.33	
Chabab Rif Al Hoceima	12 September 2018	8 April 2019	21	5	6	10	23.81	
Ittihad Tanger	26 January 2020	6 November 2020	17	5	7	5	29.41	
RS Berkane	18 March 2021	23 June 2021	20	6	6	8	30.00	
Ittihad Tanger	18 April 2022	11 July 2022	9	1	6	2	11.11	
NorthEast United	22 May 2023	Present	69	32	21	16	46.38	
Total			151	54	52	45	35.76	

== Honours ==
NorthEast United

- Durand Cup: 2024, 2025
