= 2024–25 Kerala Blasters FC season =

Kerala Blasters
2024–25 season
- Owner: Magnum Sports Private Limited
- Director Chief Executive Officer: Nikhil Bhardwaj; Abhik Chatterjee
- Head coach: Mikael Stahre (until 16 December 2024); Tomasz Tchórz, T. G. Purushothaman (remainder of ISL season); David Català (till 2025 AIFF Super Cup)
- Stadium: Jawaharlal Nehru Stadium, Kochi, Kerala
- Indian Super League: 8th
- Indian Super Cup: Quarter-final
- Durand Cup: Quarter-final
- ISL Playoffs: Did not qualify
- Top goalscorer: League: Jesús Jiménez (11); All: Noah Sadaoui (14)
- Highest home attendance: 34,490 vs Bengaluru (25 October 2024)
- Lowest home attendance: 3,567 vs Mumbai City (7 March 2025)
- Average home league attendance: 15,894
- Biggest win: 0–8 (vs Mumbai City (N), 1 August 2024, 2024 Durand Cup)
- Biggest defeat: 4–2 (vs Bengaluru FC (N) 7 December 2024, 2024–25 Indian Super League)
Home colours	Away colours	Third colours

The 2024–25 season was the eleventh season in Kerala Blasters's existence, as well as their eleventh season in the Indian Super League.

Following the conclusion of the 2023–24 season, the Blasters started preparations for the new season right away, as just one week after their elimination from the 2023–24 league playoffs, the Blasters announced the departure of their head coach Ivan Vukomanović, who left after his three years at the club as the most successful head coach in the history of the club. Vukomanović was replaced by the Swedish manager Mikael Stahre, who joined the club on a two-year contract in May 2024. The Blasters also bid farewell to their all-time top-scorer and the golden-boot winner, Dimitrios Diamantakos, who left the club in May for a new contract with East Bengal FC. In the following days, the club would announce the departures of more of their foreign players from the previous season as the likes of Daisuke Sakai, Marko Lešković (who signed in the 2021–22 season), and Fedor Černych were released from the club following the end of their contracts. Amidst their Thailand tour ahead of the new season, the club's then longest-serving player at that time, Jeakson Singh was sold to East Bengal for a reported transfer fee of ₹3.2 crores (US$382,300) plus add-ons, with the Blasters receiving the highest transfer fee ever for an Indian player in the nation's football history.

Following their Thailand tour during the pre-season, the Blasters began their 2024–25 campaign with an 8–0 win over Mumbai City in the 2024 Durand Cup in their first competitive match of the season. This victory broke the club record for the biggest win in the Blasters' history and tied the record for the biggest win in the tournament's history, matching the score of the 1889 Durand Cup final. After going unbeaten in the next two group stage matches, the Blasters qualified for the quarter-finals, and met their rivals Bengaluru FC in the fixture, which they lost 1–0 resulting in their elimination from the tournament.

== Background ==
After a rather disappointing 2023–24 season, the Kerala Blasters' quest for their first ever silverware led them to 2024–25 season. The Blasters' 2023–24 season was marked by a roller-coaster journey consisting of injuries and suspensions. Ahead the 2023–24 campaign, the Blasters ended their six-year association with their then-most-capped player at the time, Sahal Abdul Samad, who was involved in a swap-deal with Mohun Bagan for the transfer of Pritam Kotal; with the Blasters receiving a reported transfer fee of ₹90 lakhs (US$108,000). The club went to the United Arab Emirates for their final pre-season camp ahead of the league season. The Blasters began their 2023–24 season with the 2023 Durand Cup, in which they were knocked-out of the tournament after finishing third in the group of four. Following the end of his ten-match ban, the then manager of the Blasters, Ivan Vukomanović, returned to the dugout on 27 October 2023 in the match against Odisha FC. The Blasters had a satisfactory end to the first half of the league, as by the winter-breaks in December, the Blasters reigned at the top of the table, spending 45 days at the spot. During the international breaks in January 2024, the Blasters took part in the 2024 Indian Super Cup, but was disqualified from the tournament for yet again finishing third in the group table. Coming into the second-phase of the league, an injury plagued Blasters' side coupled with dozens of suspensions, lost their winning momentum, as they ended the regular season fifth on the table. However, the Blasters qualified for the league playoffs for a third consecutive time, meeting Odisha FC in Kalinga Stadium on 19 April 2024, who put an end to the Blasters' season, as the Blasters lost the match two goals to one, thus ending a yet another season without a trophy.

== Pre-season overview ==
=== 2024 ===
==== April ====
On 26 April 2024, the Blasters announced that they had mutually parted ways with their head coach Ivan Vukomanović, after his three season at the club. Vukomanović left the club as the most capped and successful head coach in the history of the club with a win percentage of 44.8% across the league, surpassing his predecessors at the club. He also held the club record for the highest points-per-game ratio (1.58) in the league, as well as was the first Blasters' head coach to take the side to three consecutive playoffs, and left the team as the only Blasters manager to have a positive goal-difference during his tenure at the club.

On 30 April, it was reported by the Times of India reporter Marcus Mergulhao, a prominent sports journalist in India, that the Blasters had signed the Moroccan winger Noah Sadaoui from FC Goa on a two-year deal till 2026.

==== May ====
On 6 May, it was reported by Marcus Mergulhao that the Blasters had imposed a fine of Indian rupees 1 crore (US$120,000) to their then head coach Ivan Vukomanović following the infamous walk-out incident in the 2022–23 season league playoffs. Although not being formally announced by the club, the figure was disclosed in the Blasters' appeal to the Court of Arbitration for Sport against the All India Football Federation on various charges.

On 12 May, it was reported by Marcus Mergulhao that the Blasters had signed the Indian goalkeeper Nora Fernandes from Aizawl FC on a multi-year deal till 2027. In the following day, the Blasters announced the contract extension of their Indian full-back Naocha Singh, who signed a one-year permanent contract, after representing the club in the previous season as a loanee from Mumbai City FC.

On 16 May, the AIFF announced that the Blasters (along with three other clubs in the league) had failed to secure the ICLS Premier 1 club licensing for the 2024–25 season. As per the reports, the Blasters were denied the club licensing due to the safety concerns raised by the AFC General Secretary, Windsor John, over the Blasters' home ground Jawaharlal Nehru Stadium in Kochi. The clubs, who were denied the Premier 1 club licensing were given with an option to seek an exemption to participate in the national competitions by 22 May 2024 by the national federation.

On 18 May, the Blasters announced the contract extension of their club captain and their Uruguayan midfielder, Adrián Luna, on a three-year deal until 2027. Just two days following Luna's contract extension, the Blasters' striker Dimitrios Diamantakos announced that he would be leaving the side after his two-year stint at the club. Diamantakos left the club as their all-time top-scorer across all competitions, having scored 28 goals in 43 games, and after becoming the first player in the Blasters' history to win the league's Golden Boot award, after having scored 13 goals of 17 matches in the 2023–24 season.

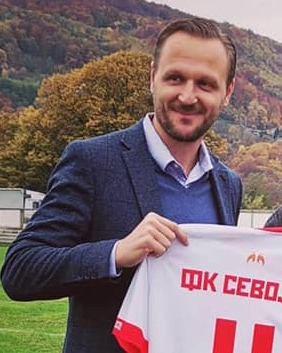
Ivan Vukomanović left the Blasters after his three seasons at the club.

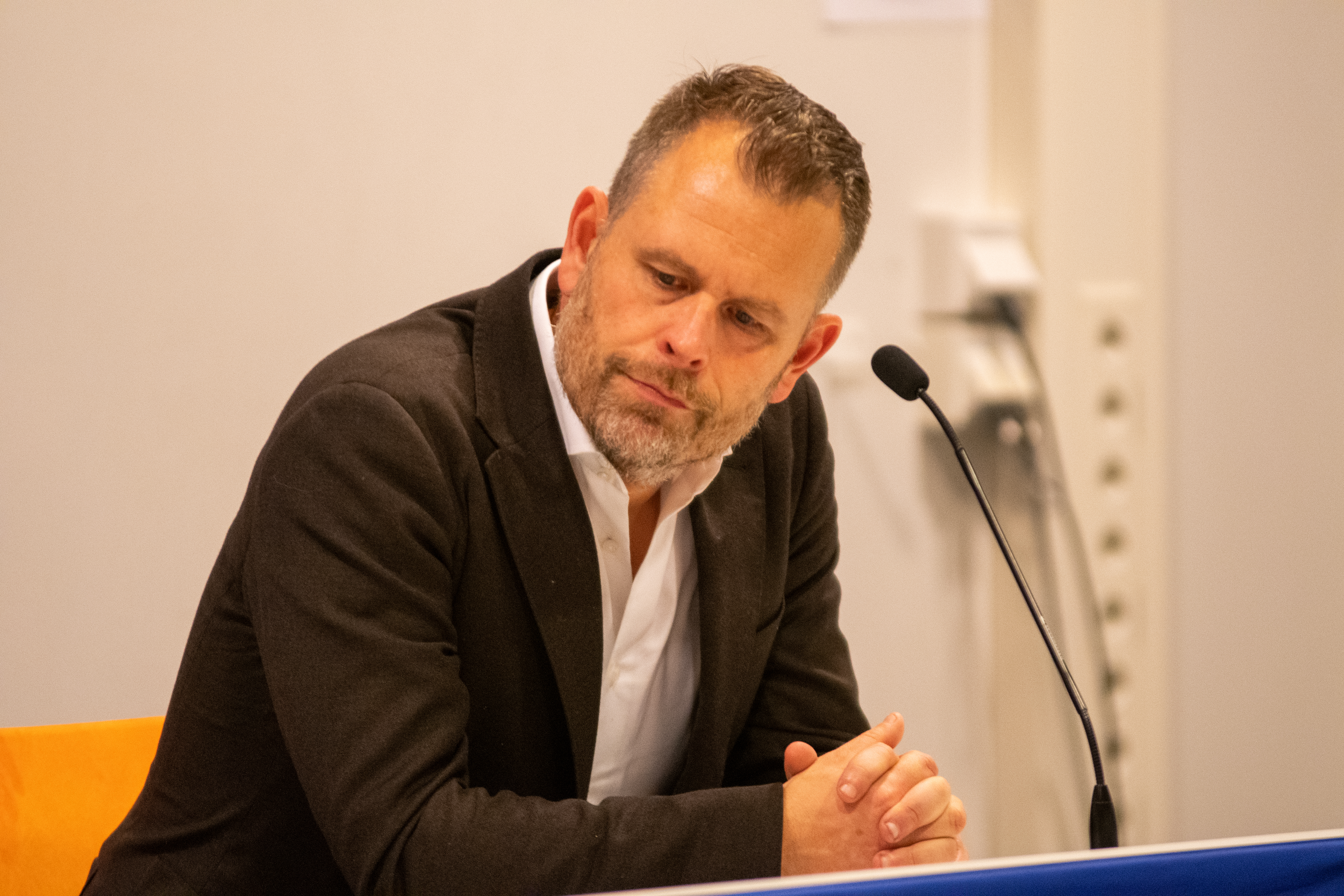
Mikael Stahre replaced Vukomanović as the Blasters head coach in May 2024.

On 23 May, the Blasters announced the appointment of the Swede, Mikael Stahre as their new head coach on a two-year deal till 2026, replacing the Serbian, Ivan Vukomanović.

Kerala Blasters FC
(@KeralaBlasters)
tweeted:

ഒരേ വികാരവും ഒരേ വിചാരവുമായി പത്തു വർഷങ്ങൾ 💛
#KBFC #KeralaBlasters #10YearsOfKBFC @IndSuperLeague

May 27, 2024

On 27 May, the Blasters celebrated their ten-year anniversary since their first season in 2014. On the same day, it was reported that the Blasters full-back Nishu Kumar, who had played the previous season on loan for East Bengal FC, had signed a permanent contract with the same side, leaving the Blasters after his four-year association with the club.

On 30 May, the Blasters forward Fedor Černych was called up to the Lithuania national team for the 2024 Baltic Cup squad.

On 31 May, the Blasters would announce a series of departures from the club, starting with the departure of their assistant coach Frank Dauwen, who served as the assistant to Vukomanović. They would then formally announce the departure of their striker Dimitrios Diamantakos following the end of his contract, with the latter joining the East Bengal FC. The Blasters would also then bid farewell to their experienced custodian Karanjit Singh following the end of his contract, along with their alternate goalkeeper, Lara Sharma, who also left the club.

==== June ====
On 1 June, the Blasters announced the departure of their Japanese winger Daisuke Sakai after his one-year stint at the club, followed by that the departure of their Croatian centre-back Marko Lešković, who left the club after his three-years at the club, leaving Luna as the only remaining foreign player from the famous 2021–22 batch. On the same day, the Blasters thanked all of their partners and sponsors from the previous season.

On 3 June, the Blasters announced the departure of their forward and Lithuania national team captain, Fedor Černych, who was signed in early 2024 as an injury replacement for Luna.

On 7 June, the Blasters announced the signing of Swede, Björn Wesström as their new assistant coach, replacing Frank Dauwen. Along with Björn, the Blasters also announced the signing of the 36 year-old Portuguese, Frederico Pereira Morais, as their assistant coach for set-pieces. The club would also announce the retaining of their Indian assistant coach, T. G. Purushothaman, as well as their goalkeeping coach, Slaven Progoveki for the 2024–25 season.

On 8 June, Onmanorama reported that the Blasters will travel to Thailand on the first-week of July for a two-week pre-season camp ahead of the 2024 Durand Cup tournament. The next day, the Blasters confirmed the retaining of their Strength and Conditioning Coach Werner Martens through a social media post.

On 12 June, the Blasters announced the signing of the young Indian goalkeeper, Som Kumar, from Slovenian club NK Olimpija Ljubljana on a four-year deal till 2028, becoming the first Blasters' signing under Stahre.

On 15 June, the Blasters announced that they would be travelling to Thailand for their pre-season preparations; a news which was earlier reported by Onmanorama a week prior to the official announcement. The club announced that they would set up their camp in Chonburi, Thailand from 3 July to 22 July, with the players directly reporting to the Pattana Sports Complex. The Blasters also stated that the team would play at least three friendlies against top-tier Thai clubs during their three weeks at the country ahead of the Durand Cup tournament, which would commence on 26 July 2024.

On 18 June, the Blasters announced the signing of the twenty-one year old Indian full-back, Likmabam Rakesh on a three-year deal till 2027; who signed from the recently relegated I-League club, NEROCA FC.

On 24 June, the Blasters announced the signing of Indian winger R. Lalthanmawia from I-League club Aizawl FC, on a three-year contract until 2027. Three days later, the Blasters officially announced the arrival of the Indian goalkeeper Nora Fernandes, who was also signed from Aizawl on a three-year deal. The club also further stated that both the players would join the squad in Thailand for their pre-season camp on 3 July.

On 28 June, the Blasters' youth team players by the likes of Ebindas Yesudasan and Thomas Cherian, along with Korou Singh were called up to the India national under-20 football team's 36-men probable squad for the 2024 SAFF U-20 Championship.

==== July ====
On 1 July, the Blasters announced FREEMANS - Measuring Tools as their main sponsors on a five-year sponsorship deal. On the next day, following the months of speculation, the Blasters officially announced the signing of the Moroccan winger Noah Sadaoui, who signed a two-year contract following his spell at FC Goa. The Blasters confirmed the arrival of the team in Thailand for their pre-season preparations on 3 July, and subsequently announced their squad for the pre-season camp. The club also stated that the players who were injured in the last season, along with some players who were sent on loan during the previous season would also be training with the first-team; with Korou Singh to join the camp following his India U-20 national team commitment.

On 9 July, the Blasters announced the loan departure of their young Indian winger Nihal Sudeesh on a season long loan-deal to the fellow ISL club Punjab FC. The following day, the Blasters were drawn in to the Group C for the 2024 Durand Cup tournament. The club played their first pre-season friendly-match against the Thai League 2 club Pattaya United on 11 July behind closed doors, which they would lose 2–1, with Yoihenba Meitei scoring the consolation goal for the Blasters.

On 17 July, the Blasters played their second pre-season friendly against Thai League 2 club Samut Prakan City, which they won 1–3. The Blasters took a two-nil lead with Muhammad Saheef and Kwame Peprah finding the back of the net by the end of the first-half. Samut Prakan City pulled one back in the second-half, however a third goal for the Blasters by Ishan Pandita secured the team their first win in their pre-season tour in Thailand. On the following day, the Blasters would announce the departure of their longest-serving player Jeakson Singh, who ended his six years association with the club, after the club reached an agreement with East Bengal FC for the transfer of the player for a reported record Indian transfer fee of ₹3.2 cores plus add-ons.

On 20 July, the Blasters played their third pre-season friendly in Thailand against Thai League 1 club Ratchaburi FC which they won 1–4, with Mohammed Aimen, Kwame Peprah, Lalthanmawia, and Muhammad Saheef finding themselves in the score-sheet for the Blasters.

On 24 July, the Blasters announced the signing of the French defender Alexandre Coeff on a one-year contract, following his stint at the Ligue 2 club Stade Malherbe Caen.

On 26 July, the Blasters would announce the game tech platform, Batery AI as their presenting sponsor for the upcoming season. The next day, the club announced the contract extension of their Montenegrin defender Miloš Drinčić on a two-year deal till 2026.

On 30 July, the Blasters announced the contract extension of their Indian defender Sandeep Singh till 2027 on a three-year contract. Later that day, the Blasters' young full-back Aritra Das announced his departure from the club following his four years at the club via an Instagram post.

On 31 July, the Blasters would provide a statement which stated that Aritra will be joining the I-League club Inter Kashi FC as part of a transfer agreement which includes a buy-back clause in his contract to Inter Kashi. With the club's Durand Cup campaign set to begin on 1 August, the Blasters announced their kit and squad for the Durand Cup tournament on the same date. The club also announced that their forward Jaushua Sotirio was out of the Durand Cup squad after sustaining an injury during their pre-season tour in Thailand, and their midfielder Vibin Mohanan was also under rehabilitation with the team after sustaining an injury during the same tour. The Blasters also stated that their defender Prabir Das was also out of the squad as the latter returned home due to personal reasons, and the club further clarified that their goalkeeper Sachin Suresh and the newly signed defender Alexandre Coeff would join the squad in due time. Following the recent landslides in Wayanad, Kerala, the Blasters announced that their players would wear black armbands during their opening group fixture of the Durand Cup to show solidarity with those affected by the disaster.

== Season overview ==
=== 2024 ===
==== August ====

The Blasters' starting line-up for their first Durand Cup match of the season against Mumbai City FC on 1 August 2024, in which the Blasters recorded a historic 8–0 win.

On 1 August, the Blasters played their first competitive match of the season in the Durand Cup against Mumbai City FC, which they won with a record-breaking score of 0–8. Mumbai City's defence was under relentless attack from early on in the match, and the Blasters' Noah Sadaoui had one goal disallowed for an offside in the first half of the game. However, Noah would find the net just one minute later, scoring his debut goal for the club and opening the scoresheet for the Blasters. In the 39th minute, Kwame Peprah would double the lead for the Blasters, and would subsequently complete a brace just five minutes later following a rebounded ball from Noah in front of the opposition net. Blasters were leading three-nil while coming into the second-half. Noah would score his second of the night in the 50th minute with a header from a Mohammed Aimen's cross from the wing. Just two minute after Noah's brace, Peprah would complete his hat-trick to score the fifth goal of the night for the Blasters. This was not the only hat-trick by a Blasters' player in the match, as Noah would also score his third of the night with a 76th-minute goal, thereby completing his hat-trick in his debut match for the club. Ishan Pandita was subbed in for the hat-trick hero Kwame Peprah. Pandita would score his debut goal for the Blasters in the 86th minute, and would complete a brace just one minute later to further stretch the scoreline. The match ended 8–0 to the Blasters following Pandita's brace. This match broke several records as it became the highest-win ever in the history of the Blasters, and would also become the joint-biggest win in the Durand Cup history by sharing the record with the 1889 Durand Cup final between Highland Light Infantry and Shimla Rifles, which also ended 8–0 at full-time.

On 4 August, the Blasters played their second group stage match in the Durand Cup against Punjab FC, which ended in a 1–1 draw. Both the sides started with their main-eleven with Punjab taking the lead through Luka Majcen, who scored by overcoming an offside trap set by the Blasters defence just before the half-time in the added time. Aimen, who came in as a substitute for Yoihenba Meitei ahead of the second-half scored the equalizer for the Blasters from a Peprah's cutting pass across goal in the 56th minute, as the latter made no mistake and tapped the ball into the goal to seal the draw for the Blasters as the match ended in a 1–1 draw in the Salt Lake Stadium.

On 10 August, the Blasters officially announced Reyaur Sports as their kitting and merchandise partner for the upcoming season.

On 10 August, the Blasters would play their last group stage match of the Durand Cup against CISF Protectors FT, which they won 7–0. The Blasters were quick to attack as they netted an early goal through a header from Peprah in the 6th minute of the game. Within just two minutes, Noah would double the lead for the 'Yellow Army' with a half-volleyed goal. The Blasters' third goal of the night came from Aimen, who slotted the ball into the bottom left corner of the net in the 16th minute. It did not take so long for the Blasters to score their fourth of the night as Noah would complete his brace just four minutes after Aimen tripled the lead. The goal-scoring spree continued for the Blasters, as both Naocha Singh and Mohammed Azhar (the twin brother of third goal-scorer, Aimen) would score their debut goals for the club in the 25th and 44th minutes respectively as the Blasters led by six goals to nil by the end of the first-half. The Blasters continued their relentless attack into the opposition defence but were not entirely able to capitalize on the goal-scoring chances in the later-half. In the 88th minute, Bryce Miranda was brought down in the penalty-box by a CISF defender, and the match referee Crystal John would award the Blasters with a penalty. However, Noah Sadaoui would chip the ball above the crossbar. Noah was quick to redeem himself, as just one minute after his missed penalty, he would score from an open-play and would subsequently complete his second hat-trick of the 2024 Durand Cup. Noah's hat-trick was the final blow to the opposition as the Blasters defeated the CISF Protectors by a 7–0 scoreline, thus solidifying their spot at the top of the group table.

Following the 3–0 win of Punjab against Mumbai City on 11 August, the Blasters qualified for the quarter-finals of the Durand Cup for the second time in their history due their +15 goal-difference, despite having the same points as Punjab in the group table.

On 14 August, the Blasters' youth division players: Ebindas Yesudasan and Thomas Cherian, along with Korou Singh were called up to the India under-20 football team's final 23-member squad for the 2024 SAFF U-20 Championship.

The Blasters' starting line-up for their quarter-final fixture in the Durand Cup against their arch-rivals Bengaluru FC on 23 August 2024. This was the first Southern Derby of the season.

On 23 August, the Blasters played their quarter-final match of the 2024 Durand Cup against rivals Bengaluru FC, which they lost 1–0. Thirty seconds into the match, the Blasters' goalkeeper Som Kumar was injured and was taken-off the pitch due to a head-on-head collision with ex-Blasters player and Bengaluru forward Jorge Pereyra Díaz. Following a goalless first-half, the match seemed to go towards a penalty-shootout but a last second goal by Pereyra Díaz resulted in the elimination of the Blasters, as they fell short 1–0 at regular-time resulting in their disqualification. The next day, the club provided a statement on the injury sustained by Som on their X handle, where they stated that he was in a stable condition after undergoing treatment for his head injury.

On 29 August, it was heavily reported by the media that the Blasters had signed the Spanish forward Jesús Jiménez on a two-year deal. The next day, the Blasters officially announced the arrival of Jiménez on a two-year contract till 2026 from the Greek club OFI. Jiménez arrived at the club after having taken part in OFI pre-season training for the upcoming season. Jiménez would mutually terminate his contract with OFI before joining the Blasters.

On 31 August, following the conclusion of the 2024 Durand Cup Final, Noah Sadaoui won the Golden Boot award for topping the goal-scoring chart with 6 goal throughout the tournament.

==== September ====
On 3 September, the Blasters' chairman Nikhil Bhardwaj issued his statement via an X post, addressing the concerns and dissatisfaction raised by their supporters in the social media and by their fan group Manjappada for having an 'underwhelming' preparation for the upcoming league campaign. Later that day, the club would announce the loan departures of Likmabam Rakesh (to Punjab FC), Bikash Singh (to Mohammedan SC), Thomas Cherian (to Churchill Brothers FC Goa), Muhammad Ajsal (to Gokulam Kerala FC) and Mohammed Arbaz (to Real Kashmir FC) for the upcoming season.

On 5 September, the Blasters announced their away-kit for the upcoming league campaign.

On 7 September, the Blasters announced Medhaa Corporate Advisors as their principal sponsors for the upcoming season, replacing previous sponsors, BYJU'S.

On 8 September, the Blasters would announce their home-kit for the upcoming season, along with the three-year contract extension of their Indian midfielder Freddy Lallawmawma with an option for further extension. Later that day, the club announced that their captain Adrián Luna has been granted a short-term personal leave to attend the birth of his baby, with the latter joining the squad back in one week time.

On 9 September, the Blasters announced the departure of their Nigerian forward Justine Emmanuel following a mutual agreement for the termination of the player's contract. They also announced that they had played a friendly match against the newly promoted ISL side, Mohammedan SC on the previous day, which they won 2–0.

On 10 September, the Blasters' management met with Chief Minister of Kerala, Pinarayi Vijayan, to donate ₹25 lakhs to the Chief Minister's Distress Relief Fund (CMDRF) for the rehabilitation of the people affected by the landslides in Wayanad in the month of July. The Blasters' also launched a 'Goal for Wayanad" initiative by which the club plans to contribute ₹1 lakh for every goal scored by the Blasters in the upcoming league season to the CMDRF. They further stated that along with the ₹25 lakhs cheque to CM's relief fund, the co-owners of the Blasters has donated an additional ₹1.25 crore for the rehabilitation process. Later that same day, the club announced Adrián Luna and Miloš Drinčić as the club's captain and vice-captains respectively for the upcoming league campaign, following which they announced Salpido as their official audio partner for the season.

On 11 September. the Blasters announced their third kit for the upcoming season. On the same day, the Blasters announced the extension of their association with Kalliyath TMT as their associate sponsor for the 7th season.

On 13 September, the Blasters announced KCare of Kalliyath Group as one of their official sponsors for the season, and following which the club announced that they have reduced the stadium capacity by 50 per cent for their season opener against Punjab due to Onam celebrations across the state of Kerala. The club would further announce Futureace Hospital as their official medical partner for the league season.

On 14 September, the Blasters announced the contract extension of their Indian midfielder Yoihenba Meitei till 2027 with an option to extend. They also announced their squad for the league season, followed by the announcement of VIP as their associate sponsor for the season.

The Blasters' starting line-up for their first Indian Super League match of the season against Punjab FC on 15 September 2024.

On 15 September, the Blasters played their first league match of the season against Punjab FC, which they lost 1–2 at home. A closely competed first-half saw neither teams taking a lead. Momentum of the match remained unchanged until the final ten minutes of the regular time, as a penalty goal by Punjab's Luka Majcen in the 86h minute gave the visitors a late lead. The Blasters' new signing, Jesús Jiménez would level the match for the Blasters with a headed ball from a Pritam Kotal's cross just two minutes into the injury time, putting the Blasters back into the match with his debut goal for the club. When the match seemed to lean towards a draw, Filip Mrzljak of Punjab would score the winner for the visitors in the final minutes of the injury time, as the Blasters lost their first match of the season.

On 18 September, the Blasters announced the contract extension of their Indian midfielder Vibin Mohanan on a new four-year contract till 2029.

On 22 September, the Blasters played their second league match of the season against East Bengal FC, which they won 2–1 at home. Neither sides would break the deadlock in the first half of the game, but the first act of the match came in the form of an opener from the visitors, as Vishnu Puthiya Valappill scored the opening goal for East Bengal in the 59th minute of the match. The Blasters were quick to retaliate as Noah would level the match in the 63rd minute with a shot between the legs of the East Bengal keeper, Prabhsukhan Gill to restore the match for the Blasters. Later into the second-half, Peprah would come in as a substitute for Jiménez, who would prove to be pivotal for the Yellow Army as he scored the winner for the Blasters with an edge of the box shot into near post in the 88th minute, as the Blasters won their first league match of the season.

On 29 September, the Blasters played their third league match of the season against NorthEast United FC, which ended in a 1–1 draw on the road. Just like the previous two matchdays, neither two sides scored by the end of first 45 minutes.NorthEast United received a free-kick some yards outside the penalty box, which was fired in by Alaeddine Ajaraie in the 58th minute as Sachin Suresh lost the ball between his legs, allowing it to pass the goal line after stopping the free-kick. However, the Blasters' equalized through Noah, whose left-footed strike from outside the box found the right bottom corner of net in the 67th minute. A tightly contested match concluded with a red card for Asheer Akhtar, who was sent-off due to challenge on Noah, as the Blasters' registered their first draw of the season.

==== October ====
On 1 October, the Blasters appointed Abhik Chatterjee as their new Chief Executive Officer (CEO), with Chatterjee assuming the position from 3 October. The next day, the club provided a statement on the injury sustained by their defender Aibanbha Dohling following a successful arthroscopic surgery on his knee.

On 3 October, the Blasters played their fourth league match of the season against Odisha FC, which ended in a 2–2 draw on the road. A fast-paced first-half saw the Blasters open the scoresheet through Noah Sadaoui, whose left-footed curler found the back of the net in the 18th minute. Having assisted for Noah just three minutes before, Jiménez would score his second of the league from a Noah's assist as they doubled the lead in just 21 minutes into the first-half. After the Blasters' keeper failed to stop an Ahmed Jahouh's ball, a late clearance by Coeff resulted in the Blasters conceding an own goal in the latter's name just 8 minutes after the Blasters doubled their lead. Odisha would finally score an equalizer in the 36th minute through Diego Maurício, who levelled the score-line before going into the second-half. Both the sides failed to capitalize on their goal scoring chances during the second-half with the Blasters missing out on a potential penalty on their favour, as the match ended in a 2–2 draw with both sides taking a point.

On 15 October 2024, the Blasters announced the arrival of Englishman, Cole Carter as their reserve side's new goalkeeping coach.

On 20 October, the Blasters played their fifth league match of the season against newly promoted Mohammedan SC, which they won 1–2 on the road. Having a weak start to the to first-half, the Blasters went down by a goal after Mohammedan's Mirjalol Kasimov converted a penalty following a foul by the keeper Som Kumar in the eighteen-yard box in the 23rd minute. Mikael Stahre would sub in Peprah during the second-half who proved to be pivotal, as he scored the equalizer for the Yellow Army in the 67th minute from a Noah's assist. It did not take the Blasters long to score the winning goal as a cross from Naocha Singh was met by a header from Jiménez, who slotted the ball in the back of the net to ensure the three points for the Blasters. Following the winner, the Blasters' players and travelling fans were met with aggression from Mohammedan fans, who pelted the Blasters' fans with bottles and stones and threw other projectiles into the pitch, causing the referee to temporarily suspend the game. After the crowd was contained, the referee resumed the match, and the Blasters' won their second league match of the season with a comeback.

On 21 October, the Blasters provided a statement on the crowd incident during their match Mohammedan on the previous day, and their complaints lodged to the Kolkata authorities and to the league.

On 25 October, the Blasters played their sixth league match of the season in derby match against Bengaluru FC at home, which they lost 1–3. A sold-out Jawaharlal Nehru Stadium in Kochi saw the Blasters going down by an early goal by Jorge Pereyra Díaz, who chipped the ball into the goal following a defensive error by Pritam Kotal. The Blasters had their fair share of chances to equalize during the first-half, and it came to be fruitful as the Blasters received a penalty-kick in the last minute of the injury time after Peprah was brought down by Rahul Bheke in the box. Jesús Jiménez would make no mistake as he put the ball in the back of the net to pull the Blasters back into the game ahead of the later half. However, Bengaluru would claim their lead back through Édgar Méndez in the 74th minute, who capitalized from yet another defensive mistake by the Blasters. Édgar would score his second of the night in the injury time of the second-half, as the Blasters lost their second match of the season.

==== November ====
On 3 November, the Blasters played their seventh league match of the season against Mumbai City FC, which they lost 4–2 on the road. Nikos Karelis's brace across 9th and a 55th-minute penalty would give Mumbai City a two-goal lead. However, Jiménez would capitalize on a penalty for the Blasters in the 57th minute to give them their first goal of the night. In the 71st minute, Peprah's headed goal would give the equalizer for the Blasters, but he was sent-off with a second-yellow due to player removing his jersey till his head whilst celebrating the goal. Mumbai would take advantage of the ten-man Blasters side, as they scored two more goals in the 75th and 90th minutes respectively through Nathan Rodrigues and Lallianzuala Chhangte, as the Blasters lost their third match of the season.

On 5 November, the Blasters' midfielder Vibin Mohanan was called up for national team for the first-time in his career, after being named in the 26-men probables for a friendly match against Malaysia.

On 7 November, the Blasters played their eighth league match of the season against Hyderabad FC, which they lost 1–2 at home. Jiménez scored in his fifth continuous game for the Blasters to give them an early lead in the 13th minute from a Korou Singh's assist. With that assist, Korou would become the youngest player in the league to provide an assist. The visitors would equalize through Andrei Alba in the 43rd minute, who would then go on the score a winner for Hyderabad after successfully converting a penalty-kick in the second-half, as the Blasters lost their fourth match of the season in a match riddled controversial refereeing decisions.

On 24 November, the Blasters played their ninth match of the season against Chennaiyin FC in the derby match, which they won 3–0 at home. Neither sides scored by the end of the first 45 minutes. The opening goal of the match was scored by Jiménez, who scored in his sixth consecutive game for the Blasters as he shot a close range ball into the bottom right corner in the 55th minute. Fourteen minutes later, Noah Sadaoui would double the lead for the Tuskers as he made no mistake and converted a Luna's ball into the back of net. The Blasters would secure their three points and bragging rights of the derby through a final goal by Rahul K. P. who capitalized on a Noah's solo assist in the added-time of the later-half, as the Blasters won their third match of the season. This was also the club's clean-sheet in 18 league games.

On 28 November, Blasters played their tenth league match against FC Goa, losing their sixth home match at Kochi for 1–0. Goa scored the only goal of the match through Boris Singh Thangjam at 40th minute. Blasters failed to score an equalizer in the second half as the match ended in a 1–0 loss for Kerala Blasters.

After the loss, Blasters faced Bengaluru FC once again on 7 December. The match took place at Bengaluru's home ground Sree Kanteerava Stadium. After early misses from both sides, Sunil Chhetri scored an early lead for Bengaluru at the 8th minute. Ryan Williams doubled the lead on 38th minute and both team farewelled for the halftime in the score 2–0. After the kick off for the second half, Jesus Jimenez and Freddy Lallawmawma scored the comeback goals for Blasters, equalizing the score. After promising sequences for Blasters, Chhetri regained their lead in the 73rd minute, assisted by Pereyra Diaz. Despite constant attempts, Bengaluru managed to score another goal through Chhetri, making him the oldest ISL player to score a hat-trick. He also became the first player to score a hat-trick this season. The final whistle came on the 98th minute, securing a win for Bengaluru and yet another loss for Blasters.

Despite consecutive losses and inconsistent performance, Blasters faced Mohun Bagan Super Giant in an away game at the Salt Lake stadium, Kolkata with 4 changes in their starting line up. The game began with kick off touch from Adrián Luna. After consecutive attacks and aggression from the visitors, Vishal Kaith managed to keep the post clear. Mohun Bagan managed to score the opening goal in the 33rd minute from a gripping mistake from goalkeeper Sachin Suresh through Jamie Maclaren. The second half began with the equaliser from Blasters, in the 51st minute through Jesús Jiménez. After several attempts from the away side, Miloš Drinčić managed to direct the ball to the goal for the comeback from free kick, following an accident drop from Vishal. Mohun Bagan yet managed to equilize the score in the 86th minute. Mohun Bagan scored a stunning victory with the last minute goal from Alberto in the 95th minute with a 5-minute injury time.

As of 11 December 2024

=== First-team squad ===
Notes:

- Table below mentions the squad registered by the club for the 2024–25 season.
- Flags indicate national team as defined under FIFA eligibility rules. Players may hold more than one non-FIFA nationality.
- Player^{*} – Players who joined the club permanently or on loan during the season.
- Player^{†} – Players who were not registered by the club for the 2024–25 season.

No.	Name	Nat.	Pos.	Footedness	Date of birth (age)	Height	Last Club	Transfer Fee	Signed	Contract Till	Win%	Notes
Goalkeepers
1	Sachin Suresh	(India)	GK	Right	18 January 2001 (age 25)	1.83 m (6 ft 0 in)	Youth System	N/A	2021	2026	33.33%	N/A
2	Nora Fernandes	(India)	GK	Right	18 June 1998 (age 28)	1.92 m (6 ft 3 in)	(India) Aizawl FC	Free transfer	2024	2027	100%	N/A
31	Som Kumar	(India)	GK	Right	27 February 2005 (age 21)	1.91 m (6 ft 2 in)	(Slovenia) NK Olimpija Ljubljana	Free transfer	2024	2028	37.5%	N/A
Defenders
3	Sandeep Singh	(India)	RB/CB/LB	Right	1 March 1995 (age 31)	1.79 m (5 ft 10 in)	(India) TRAU FC	Free transfer	2020	2027	40%	N/A
4	Hormipam Ruivah	(India)	CB	Right	25 January 2001 (age 25)	1.83 m (6 ft 0 in)	(India) RoundGlass Punjab FC	Free transfer	2021	2027	40%	N/A
5	Muhammed Saheef	(India)	LB	Left	7 February 2003 (age 23)	1.84 m (6 ft 0 in)	(India) Gokulam Kerala FC	Loan Return	2022	2026	40%	N/A
15	Miloš Drinčić (Vice-Captain)	(Montenegro)	CB/LB	Right	14 February 1999 (age 27)	1.95 m (6 ft 5 in)	(Belarus) FC Shakhtyor Soligorsk	Free transfer	2023	2026	36.36%	N/A
20	Pritam Kotal	(India)	CB/RB	Right	9 September 1993 (age 33)	1.80 m (5 ft 11 in)	(India) Mohun Bagan Super Giant	Swap deal + ₹90 lakhs (Note: Swap deal with Mohun Bagan SG for Sahal Abdul Samad in the 2023–24 season.)	2023	2026	30%	N/A
27	Aibanbha Dohling	(India)	LB/CB	Right	23 March 1996 (age 30)	1.76 m (5 ft 9^{1}/_{2} in)	(India) FC Goa	₹1.45 crore (US$174,000)	2023	2026	40%	N/A
29	Alexandre Coeff	(France)	CB/CDM	Right	20 February 1992 (age 34)	1.85 m (6 ft 1 in)	(France) Stade Malherbe Caen	Free transfer	2024	2025	22.22%	N/A
33	Prabir Das	(India)	RB	Right	20 December 1993 (age 32)	1.72 m (5 ft 8 in)	(India) Bengaluru FC	Free transfer	2023	2026	0%	N/A
50	Naocha Singh	(India)	LB	Left	24 August 1999 (age 27)	1.68 m (5 ft 6 in)	(India) Mumbai City FC	Free transfer	2023	2025	41.67%	N/A
Midfielders
6	Freddy Lallawmawma	(India)	CDM	Right	27 July 2002 (age 24)	1.71 m (5 ft 7 in)	(India) Punjab FC	Undisclosed fee	2023	2027	50%	N/A
8	Vibin Mohanan	(India)	CM	Right	6 February 2003 (age 23)	1.73 m (5 ft 7 in)	Youth System	N/A	2022	2029	33.33%	N/A
10	Adrián Luna (Captain)	(Uruguay)	AM/LW/CM/CF	Right	12 March 1992 (age 34)	1.67 m (5 ft 6 in)	(Australia) Melbourne City FC	Free transfer	2021	2027	36.36%	N/A
13	Danish Farooq Bhat	(India)	LM	Right	9 May 1996 (age 30)	1.85 m (6 ft 1 in)	(India) Bengaluru FC	₹25 lakhs (US$30,000)	2023	2026	40%	N/A
17	Saurav Mandal	(India)	RM/RW	Both	6 November 2000 (age 26)	1.75 m (5 ft 9 in)	(India) Churchill Brothers FC Goa	Undisclosed fee	2022	2025	0%	N/A
18	Bryce Miranda	(India)	LM/LW	Left	23 September 1999 (age 27)	1.75 m (5 ft 9 in)	(India) Churchill Brothers FC Goa	Undisclosed fee	2022	2026	50%	N/A
22	Yoihenba Meitei	(India)	CM	Right	7 February 2004 (age 22)	1.55 m (5 ft 1 in)	Youth System	N/A	2023	2027	50%	N/A
25	Korou Singh	(India)	LM/LW	Right	3 December 2006 (age 19)	1.67 m (5 ft 5 in)	Youth System	N/A	2024	TBC	33.33%	N/A
32	Mohammed Azhar	(India)	CM	Right	20 January 2003 (age 23)	1.73 m (5 ft 7 in)	Youth System	N/A	2023	2026	57.14%	N/A
97	R. Lalthanmawia	(India)	LW/RW	Both	9 May 2002 (age 24)	TBC	(India) Aizawl FC	Free transfer	2024	2027	0%	N/A
Forwards
7	Rahul K. P.	(India)	RW/CF	Right	16 March 2000 (age 26)	1.66 m (5 ft 5 in)	(India) Indian Arrows	Free transfer	2019	2025	50%	N/A
9	Jesús Jiménez	(Spain)	CF	Right	5 November 1993 (age 33)	1.83 m (6 ft 0 in)	(Greece) OFI	Free transfer	2024	2026	33.33%	N/A
14	Kwame Peprah	(Ghana)	ST	Left	16 December 2000 (age 25)	1.83 m (6 ft 0 in)	(Israel) Hapoel Hadera F.C.	Free transfer	2023	2025	41.67%	N/A
19	Mohammed Aimen	(India)	CF/LW	Right	20 January 2003 (age 23)	1.73 m (5 ft 7 in)	Youth System	N/A	2023	2026	33.33%	N/A
26	Ishan Pandita	(India)	CF	Right	26 May 1998 (age 28)	1.83 m (6 ft 0 in)	(India) Jamshedpur FC	Free transfer	2023	2025	100%	N/A
45	Sreekuttan MS	(India)	CF	Right	30 November 2004 (age 21)	1.81 m (5 ft 11 in)	Youth System	N/A	2023	2025	100%	N/A
77	Noah Sadaoui	(Morocco)	LW	Right	14 September 1993 (age 33)	1.80 m (5 ft 11 in)	(India) FC Goa	Free transfer	2024	2026	50%	N/A
Unregistered foreign players
11	Jaushua Sotirio	(Australia)	RW/LW/CF	Right	11 October 1995 (age 31)	1.75 m (5 ft 9 in)	(Australia) Newcastle Jets FC	Undisclosed fee	2023	2025	0%	N/A

Note:

Position	Number of players								Average age	Average height
Position	Home grown	Non-home grown	Senior	Reserves	Left-footed	Right-footed	Both-footed	Total	Average age	Average height
Goalkeepers	1	2	3	0	0	3	0	3	25 years, 112 days	1.89 m (6 ft 1 in)
Defenders	1	8	9	0	2	7	0	9	29 years, 270 days	1.80 m (5 ft 11 in)
Midfielders	2	8	8	2	1	7	2	10	25 years, 271 days	1.71 m (5 ft 7 in)
Attackers (Note: Excluding Jaushua Sotirio)	3	4	6	1	1	6	0	7	27 years, 206 days	1.78 m (5 ft 10 in)
All	7	22	26	3	4	23	2	29	27 years, 32 days	1.79 m (5 ft 11 in)

==== Squad number changes ====
Notes:

- Players and squad numbers last updated on 12 September 2024.
- The list is sorted by new squad number.
- Player^{*} – Player who joined Kerala Blasters permanently or on loan during the season.
- Player^{†} – Player who departed Kerala Blasters permanently or on loan during the season

Player	Position(s)	Prev. No.	New No.	Prev. Player	Notes	Refs.
(India) Sachin Suresh	GK	31	1	(India) Karanjit Singh	Karanjit retired after the previous season	
(India) Nora Fernandes	GK	—	2	(India) Muhammed Saheef	Saheef opted for number 12 shirt	
(India) Muhammed Saheef	LB	12	5	(India) Jeakson Singh	Saheef opted for number 5 shirt following the 2024 Durand Cup	
(Spain) Jesús Jiménez	CF	—	9	(Greece) Dimitrios Diamantakos	Diamantakos departed the club	
(India) Muhammed Saheef	LB	2	12	(India) Mohammad Rakip	Rakip departed the club	
(India) Bryce Miranda	LW	81	18	(India) Sahal Abdul Samad	Sahal departed the club	
(India) Mohammed Arbaz	GK	99	21	(India) Bijoy Varghese	Bijoy was left out of Durand Cup squad and Arbaz was given the number 21 shirt	
(India) Sagolsem Bikash Singh	LW	—	23	(India) Lara Sharma	Returned from loan	
(France) Alexandre Coeff	CB/RB	—	29	(Netherlands) Mark Sifneos	Sifneos departed the club	
(India) Som Kumar	GK	—	31	(India) Sachin Suresh	Sachin opted for number 1 shirt	
(India) Muhammad Ajsal	LW	—	44	(Brazil) Rodrigo Arroz	Returned from loan	
(Morocco) Noah Sadaoui	LW	—	77	(India) Nihal Sudeesh^{†}	Nihal departed the club on loan	
(India) R. Lalthanmawia	LW/RW	—	97	None	Lalthanmawia is the first player to opt number 97 shirt	
(India) Likmabam Rakesh	LB	—	—	N/A		

== Transfers ==
=== Transfers In ===
Date	Player	No.	Position(s)	Last Club	Contract Length	Transfer window	Fee	Refs.
12 May 2024	(India) Naocha Singh	50	LB	(India) Mumbai City FC	1 year	Pre-season	Free transfer	
12 June 2024	(India) Som Kumar	31	GK	(Slovenia) NK Olimpija Ljubljana	4 years	Pre-season	Free transfer	
18 June 2024	(India) Likmabam Rakesh	—	LB	(India) NEROCA FC	3 years	Pre-season	Free transfer	
24 June 2024	(India) R. Lalthanmawia	97	LW/RW	(India) Aizawl FC	3 years	Pre-season	Free transfer	
27 June 2024	(India) Nora Fernandes	2	GK	(India) Aizawl FC	3 years	Pre-season	Free transfer	
2 July 2024	(Morocco) Noah Sadaoui	77	LW	(India) FC Goa	2 years	Pre-season	Free transfer	
24 July 2024	(France) Alexandre Coeff	12	CB/RB	(France) Stade Malherbe Caen	1 year	Pre-season	Free transfer	
30 August 2024	(Spain) Jesús Jiménez	9	CF	(Greece) OFI	2 years	Pre-season	Free transfer	

=== Loan Returns ===
Player	No.	Position(s)	From
(India) Nishu Kumar	22	RB/LB	(India) East Bengal FC
(India) Sagolsem Bikash Singh	23	LW	(India) Mohammedan SC
(India) Muhammad Ajsal	44	LW	(India) Inter Kashi FC
(India) Bijoy Varghese	21	CB	(India) Inter Kashi FC
(India) Givson Singh	11	CM	(India) Odisha FC
(India) Muhammad Saheef	2	LB	(India) Gokulam Kerala FC
(India) Bryce Miranda	81	LW	(India) Punjab FC

=== Promoted from Reserves ===
Player	No.	Position(s)	Date of birth (age)	Refs.
(India) Sreekuttan MS	45	CF	30 November 2004 (age 21)	

=== Contract Extensions ===
Date	Player	No.	Position(s)	Contract Till	Refs.
12 May 2024	(India) Naocha Singh	50	LB	2025	
18 May 2024	(Uruguay) Adrián Luna	10	AM/LW/CM/CF	2027	
27 July 2024	(Montenegro) Miloš Drinčić	15	CB/LB	2026	
30 July 2024	(India) Sandeep Singh	3	RB/CB/LB	2027	
7 September 2024	(India) Freddy Lallawmawma	6	CDM	2027	
14 September 2024	(India) Yoihenba Meitei	22	CM	2027	
18 September 2024	(India) Vibin Mohanan	8	CM	2029	

=== Loan Outs ===
Exit Date	Player	No.	Position(s)	To	Transfer window	Refs.
9 July 2024	(India) Nihal Sudeesh	77	RW	(India) Punjab FC	Pre-season	
3 September 2024	(India) Likmabam Rakesh	—	LB	(India) Punjab FC	Pre-season	
3 September 2024	(India) Sagolsem Bikash Singh	23	LW	(India) Mohammedan SC	Pre-season	
3 September 2024	(India) Thomas Cherian	—	CB	(India) Churchill Brothers FC Goa	Pre-season	
3 September 2024	(India) Muhammad Ajsal	44	LW	(India) Gokulam Kerala FC	Pre-season	
3 September 2024	(India) Mohammed Arbaz	21	GK	(India) Real Kashmir FC	Pre-season	

=== Transfers Out ===
Exit Date	Player	No.	Position(s)	To	Transfer window	Fee	Refs.
20 May 2024	(Greece) Dimitrios Diamantakos	9	ST	(India) East Bengal FC	Pre-season	Free transfer	
27 May 2024	(India) Nishu Kumar	22	RB/LB	(India) East Bengal FC	Pre-season	Free transfer	
31 May 2024	(India) Karanjit Singh	1	GK	(India) Hyderabad FC	Pre-season	Free transfer	
31 May 2024	(India) Lara Sharma	23	GK	(India) FC Goa	Pre-season	Free transfer	
1 June 2024	(Japan) Daisuke Sakai	21	RW/LW/AM	(Indonesia) PSM Makassar	Pre-season	Free transfer	
1 June 2024	(Croatia) Marko Lešković	55	CB	(Croatia) NK Slaven Belupo	Pre-season	Free transfer	
3 June 2024	(Lithuania) Fedor Černych	91	RW/LW/SS	(Lithuania) FK Kauno Žalgiris	Pre-season	Free transfer	
18 July 2024	(India) Jeakson Singh Thounaojam	5	CDM	(India) East Bengal FC	Pre-season	₹3.3 crores	
30 July 2024	(India) Aritra Das	66	LB	(India) Inter Kashi FC	Pre -season	Undisclosed fee + Buy-back clause	

=== Transfer summary ===
Note:

- This list is based on some of the transfer fees as reported by the media.
- This list may not involve every transfer fees involved in the Blasters' transfer window.

Expenditure ▼

Summer: ₹0

Winter: ₹TBD

Total expenditure: ₹TBD

Income ▲

Summer: ₹3,20,00,000

Winter: ₹TBD

Total income: ₹TBD

Net Total

Summer: ▲₹3,20,00,000

Winter: ₹TBD

Total: ▲₹TBD

== Club Personnel ==
As of 18 April 2025

=== First-team coaching staff ===
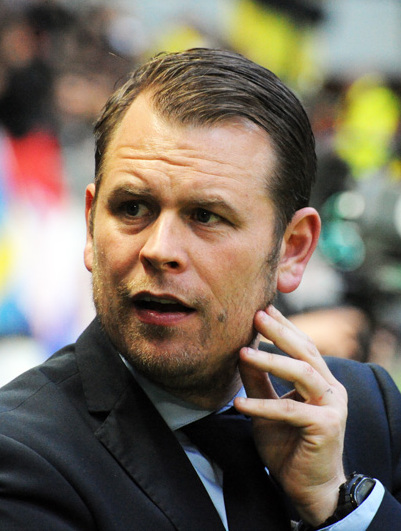
Mikael Stahre, the Blasters' head coach who was sacked mid-season due to the team's poor performance.

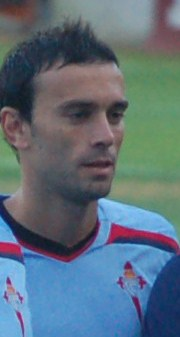
David Català, the new Kerala Blasters head coach appointed in March 2025.

Role	Nationality	Name	Year Appointed	Previous club	Refs.
Head Coach/Manager	Spain	David Català	2025	(Spain) CE Sabadell FC (as head coach)	
Assistant Coach	India	T. G. Purushothaman	2023	(India) Kerala Blasters U18 (as manager)	
Assistant Coach - Set Pieces	Portugal	Frederico Pereira Morais	2024	(Norway) Sarpsborg 08 FF (as youth team manager)	
Strength and Conditioning Coach	Belgium	Werner Martens	2021	(Slovakia) AS Trenčín (as assistant coach)	
Goalkeeping Coach	Serbia	Slaven Progovecki	2021	(Serbia) Red Star Belgrade U19 (as goalkeeping coach)	

=== Board and management team ===
Kerala Blasters Board
Position	Nationality	Name	Refs.
Co-chairman & Director	India	(India) Nikhil Bhardwaj	
Co-chairman	India	(India) Nimmagadda Prasad	
Co-chairman	India	(India) Chiranjeevi	
Co-chairman	India	(India) Allu Aravind	
Co-chairman	India	(India) Anil Yerramreddy	

Management team
Position	Nationality	Name	Refs.
Chief Executive Officer	India	(India) Abhik Chatterjee	
Sporting Director	Lithuania	(Lithuania) Karolis Skinkys	
Chief Operating Officer	India	(India) Shushen Vashishth	
Chief Revenue Officer	India	(India) Joby Joseph	
Chief Marketing Officer	India	(India) Antony Manu	
Director of academy	India	(India) Rajah Rizwan	

== Kits ==
Supplier: Reyaur Sports / Principal Sponsor: Medhaa / Sleeve Sponsor: Polycab

Home	Home alt.	Away	Third
Home	Home alt.	Away	Third	Home & Away^{DC}

Goalkeeper^{1}	Goalkeeper^{2}	Goalkeeper^{3}	Goalkeeper^{DC}

=== Kit usage ===
Kit	Combination	Usage
Home	Yellow-blue body, yellow sleeves, blue shorts and yellow socks.	Used in all home games; Indian Super League: used against TBD
Home alt.	Yellow-blue body, yellow sleeves, yellow shorts and yellow socks.	Indian Super League: used against TBD; Indian Super Cup: used against TBD
Away	Navy blue body, navy blue sleeves, navy blue shorts and navy blue socks.	Indian Super League: used at away against TBD; Indian Super Cup: used against TBD
Third	White body, white sleeves, white shorts and white socks.	Indian Super League: used at away against NorthEast United, Odisha, Mohammedan, and Mumbai City; Indian Super Cup: used against TBD
Goalkeeper^{1}	Maroon body, maroon sleeves, maroon shorts and maroon socks.	Indian Super League: Used at home against Punjab, East Bengal, and Hyderabad Used at away against Mumbai City Indian Super Cup: used against TBD
Goalkeeper^{2}	Orange body, orange sleeves, orange shorts and orange socks.	Indian Super League: used at away against TBD; Indian Super Cup: used against TBD
Goalkeeper^{3}	Sky blue body, sky blue sleeves, sky blues horts and sky blue socks.	Indian Super League: used at away against NorthEast United, Odisha, Mohammedan, and Bengaluru
Home & Away^{DC}	Yellow body, yellow sleeves, yellow shorts and yellow socks.	Used in all games
Goalkeeper^{DC}	Black body, black sleeves, black shorts and black socks.	Used in all games

== Pre-season and friendlies ==
In early June 2024, it was reported that the Blasters would travel to Thailand in the first-week of July for a two-week season camp in the country ahead of the Durand Cup. The following news was officially confirmed by the club in mid-June, with the Blasters camping in Pattana Sports Complex in Chonburi, Thailand from 3 July to 22 July. The Blasters announced their first pre-season friendly on their Thailand tour on 11 July on the matchday against Thai club Pattaya United F.C., which ended in a 2–1 defeat for the Blasters. They played the Thai club Samut Prakan City F.C. next on 17 July which they won 1–3 at full-time, winning their first match of the pre-season friendlies. The Blasters met the Thai League 1 club Ratchaburi F.C. next in their Thailand tour, with the Blasters winning the match by the tally of 1–4. Following the Ratchaburi game, Thai League 3 club Maraleina F.C. announced in Facebook that they would be playing the Blasters on 26 July. However, neither sides announced the scores of the friendly match. Later on, the Blasters' assistant coach Björn Wesström would confirm via an Instagram post that the team had indeed played a fourth friendly match in Thailand before returning to India for the Durand Cup tournament. Following their Durand Cup exit, the Blasters would play their first Indian opponent in a friendly fixture ahead of the league campaign against the newly promoted side Mohammedan SC on 8 September, where the Blasters came out on top with a 2–0 win with Sadaoui and Yoihenba striking the net.

Win Draw Loss Fixtures

11 July 2024 Friendly	(Thailand) Pattaya United	2–1	Kerala Blasters	Si Racha, Chonburi, Thailand
14:30 IST	TBC 4'; TBC 77'	Report	Sadaoui 88'	Stadium: Pattana Sports Club Stadium; Attendance: Closed Doors; Referee: TBC; Man of the Match: N/A
Note: The goal-scorers of Pattaya United were not officially announced.

17 July 2024 Friendly	(Thailand) Samut Prakan City	1–3	Kerala Blasters	Si Racha, Chonburi, Thailand
14:30 IST	TBC (TBC)	Report	Saheef (TBC); Peprah (TBC); Pandita (TBC)	Stadium: Pattana Sports Club Stadium; Attendance: Closed Doors; Referee: TBC; Man of the Match: N/A
Note: The goal-scorers of Samut Prakan City were not officially announced, along with the time of goals for the both sides.

20 July 2024 Friendly	(Thailand) Ratchaburi	1–4	Kerala Blasters	Nonthaburi, Bangkok, Thailand
14:30 IST	TBC (TBC)	Report	Aimen (TBC); Peprah (TBC); Lalthanmawia (TBC); Saheef (TBC)	Stadium: Galaxy Health & Sports Club; Attendance: Closed Doors; Referee: TBC; Man of the Match: N/A
Note: The goal-scorers of Ratchaburi were not officially announced, along with the time of goals for the both sides.

26 July 2024 Friendly	(Thailand) Maraleina	TBC–1	Kerala Blasters	Nong Khai, Thailand
14:30 IST			Pandita (TBC)	Stadium: True Arena Hua Hin; Attendance: Closed Doors; Referee: TBC; Man of the Match: N/A
Note: The matchday score was announced by neither of the clubs. However, media reported a goal for the Blasters by Ishan Pandita.

8 September 2024 Friendly	(India) Mohammedan	0–2	Kerala Blasters	Kalyani, West Bengal, India
17:30 IST		Report	Sadaoui (TBC); Yoihenba (TBC)	Stadium: Kalyani Stadium; Attendance: TBC; Referee: TBC; Man of the Match: N/A

== Competitions ==
=== Overview ===
Competition	First match	Last match	Starting round	Final position	Record							
Competition	First match	Last match	Starting round	Final position	Pld	W	D	L	GF	GA	GD	Win %
Durand Cup	1 August 2024	23 August 2024	Group stage	Quarter-final	4	2	1	1	16	2	+14	50.00
Super Cup	20 April 2025	26 April 2025	Round of 16	Quarter-final	2	1	0	1	3	2	+1	50.00
Super League	15 September 2024	12 March 2025	Matchday 3	8th	14	4	2	8	22	25	−3	28.57
Total					20	7	3	10	41	29	+12	35.00

Last updated: 2 January 2025.
Source: Soccerway

=== Durand Cup ===
==== Group stage ====
The Blasters were drawn in to the Group C on the group-stage draw conducted on 10 July, after the President on India, Droupadi Murmu, flagged-off the trophy tour of the tournament. All the group stage matches of the Blasters were played in Kolkata since all the Group C matches were drawn to be held in the region. The club has participated in the tournament since 2021, and has qualified for the knockout rounds only once in its history.

Pos	Team	Pld	W	D	L	GF	GA	GD	Pts	Qualification	KER	PUN	CIS	MCI
1	Kerala Blasters	3	2	1	0	16	1	+15	7	Advanced to knockout stage		1–1	7–0	
2	Punjab	3	2	1	0	7	1	+6	7	Advanced to knockout stage				3–0
3	CISF Protectors	3	1	0	2	2	10	−8	3			0–3		
4	Mumbai City	3	0	0	3	0	13	−13	0		0–8		0–2	

Source: Twitter
Rules for classification: Group stage tiebreakers

==== Matches ====
The fixtures of the 133rd edition of the Durand Cup was announced by the organising committee on 12 July, with the Blasters starting their campaign with the match against Mumbai City FC on 1 August 2024. The Blasters would then qualify for the knockout stages with seven points and with a superior goal-difference as compared to the second-placed Punjab FC. They would meet Bengaluru FC in the first Southern Derby of the season in the quarter-finals fixture, which ended in a 1–0 defeat for the latter, resulting in their disqualification from the Durand Cup.

Win Draw Loss Fixtures

1 August 2024 1	Mumbai City	0–8	Kerala Blasters	Santoshpur, Kolkata, West Bengal
19:00 IST	Tanush (yellow card) 35'	Report	Noah 32', 50', 76'; Peprah 39', 45', 52'; Pandita 86', 87'	Stadium: Kishore Bharati Krirangan; Attendance: 145; Referee: Ramachandran Venkatesh; Man of the Match: Noah Sadaoui (Kerala Blasters)

4 August 2024 2	Kerala Blasters	1–1	Punjab	Bidhannagar, Kolkata, West Bengal
16:00 IST	Aimen 56'	Report	Majcen 45+3'; Rai (yellow card) 51'; Mrzljak (yellow card) 90+3'; Novoselec (yellow card) 90+3'	Stadium: Salt Lake Stadium; Attendance: 351; Referee: Senthil Nathan; Man of the Match: Freddy Lallawmawma (Kerala Blasters)

10 August 2024 3	Kerala Blasters	7–0	CISF Protectors	Bidhannagar, Kolkata, West Bengal
19:00 IST	Peprah 6'; Noah 9', 20', 90'; Aimen 16'; Naocha 25'; Azhar 44'	Report		Stadium: Salt Lake Stadium; Attendance: 346; Referee: Crystal John; Man of the Match: Noah Sadaoui (Kerala Blasters)

==== Knockout stage ====
23 August 2024 Quarter-final	Bengaluru	1–0	Kerala Blasters	Bidhannagar, Kolkata, West Bengal
19:00 IST	Poojary (yellow card) 45+5'; Noguera (yellow card) 64'; Díaz 90+5'	Report	Drinčić (yellow card) 38'; Naocha (yellow card) 90+3'	Stadium: Salt Lake Stadium; Attendance: 638; Referee: Aditya Purkayastha; Man of the Match: Jorge Pereyra Díaz (Bengaluru)

=== Indian Super League ===
==== League table ====
Pos	Team	Pld	W	D	L	GF	GA	GD	Pts	Qualification
6	Mumbai City	24	9	9	6	29	28	+1	36	Qualification for the knockouts
7	Odisha	24	8	9	7	44	37	+7	33	
8	Kerala Blasters	24	8	5	11	33	37	−4	29	
9	East Bengal	24	8	4	12	27	33	−6	28 (Note: Head-to-head points: East Bengal 6, Punjab 0.)	
10	Punjab	24	8	4	12	34	38	−4	28	

Source: ISL
Rules for classification: 1) points; 2) goal difference; 3) number of goals scored; 4) head-to-head points; 5) head-to-head goal difference; 6) head-to-head goals scored; 7) fair play ranking; 8) drawing of lots
(Note: Head-to-head record is used only after all the matches between the teams in question have been played).

==== Results summary ====
Overall								Home						Away					
Pld	W	D	L	GF	GA	GD	Pts	W	D	L	GF	GA	GD	W	D	L	GF	GA	GD
9	3	2	4	15	16	−1	11	2	0	3	8	8	0	1	2	1	7	8	−1

Last updated: 30 October 2024.
Source: Indian Super League

==== Matches ====
The league fixtures from September till December were announced by the FSDL and AIFF on 25 August 2024. For the first time since 2016 season, the Blasters were not involved in the league's opening fixture, with the latter playing their first match of the season at home against Punjab FC on 15 September 2024. The fixtures for the later part of the season was announced during October.

Win Draw Loss Fixtures

15 September 2024 1	Kerala Blasters	1–2	Punjab	Kochi, Kerala
17:00 IST	Kotal (yellow card) 78'; Saheef (yellow card) 90'; Jiménez 90+2'; Rahul (yellow card) 90+7'; Saheef (yellow card) 90+11'; Freddy (yellow card) 90+11'; Azhar (yellow card) 90+11'	Report	Nihal (yellow card) 69'; Luka Majcen 86' (pen.), (yellow card) 87'; Kumar (yellow card) 90+1'; Mrzljak 90+5'; Bakenga (yellow card) 90+12'	Stadium: Jawaharlal Nehru Stadium; Attendance: 17,498; Referee: Ramachandran Venkatesh; Man of the Match: Nihal Sudeesh (Punjab)
Note: Stadium capacity was reduced by 50% due to the Onam celebrations across the state.

22 September 2024 2	Kerala Blasters	2–1	East Bengal	Kochi, Kerala
17:00 IST	Drinčić (yellow card) 45+3'; Sadaoui 63'; Peprah 88'	Report	Mahesh (yellow card) 37'; Diamantakos (yellow card) 48'; Vishnu 59'; Crespo (yellow card) 63'	Stadium: Jawaharlal Nehru Stadium; Attendance: 24,911; Referee: Tejas Nagvenkar; Man of the Match: Noah Sadaoui (Kerala Blasters)

29 September 2024 3	NorthEast United	1–1	Kerala Blasters	Guwahati, Assam
17:00 IST	Ajaraie 58'; Asheer Akhtar (red card) 82'	Report	Coeff (yellow card) 38'; Peprah (yellow card) 53'; Sadaoui 67'	Stadium: Indira Gandhi Athletic Stadium; Attendance: 9,739; Referee: Pranjal Banerjee; Man of the Match: Noah Sadaoui (Kerala Blasters)

3 October 2024 4	Odisha	2–2	Kerala Blasters	Bhubaneswar, Odisha
17:00 IST	Coeff 29' (o.g.); Maurício 36'; Puitea (yellow card) 40'; Boumous (yellow card) 45+2'	Report	Sadaoui 18'; Jiménez 21'	Stadium: Kalinga Stadium; Attendance: 8,719; Referee: Harish Kundu; Man of the Match: Noah Sadaoui (Kerala Blasters)

20 October 2024 5	Mohammedan	1–2	Kerala Blasters	Kolkata, West Bengal
17:00 IST	Chhakchhuak (yellow card) 11'; Kasimov 28' (pen.); França (yellow card) 66'; Gómez (yellow card) 69'; Mallick (yellow card) 90+6'	Report	Azhar (yellow card) 23'; Luna (yellow card) 45+3'; Peprah 67'; Jiménez 75'; Som (yellow card) 90+3'; Naocha (yellow card) 90+3'	Stadium: Kishore Bharati Krirangan; Attendance: 6,203; Referee: Ashwin Kumar; Man of the Match: Noah Sadaoui (Kerala Blasters)

25 October 2024 6	Kerala Blasters	1–3	Bengaluru	Kochi, Kerala
17:00 IST	Danish (yellow card) 3'; Luna (yellow card) 3'; Jiménez 45+2' (pen.); Coeff (yellow card) 79'; Naocha (yellow card) 86'	Report	Díaz 8'; Bheke (yellow card) 45'; Poojary (yellow card) 50'; Méndez 74', 90+4'	Stadium: Jawaharlal Nehru Stadium; Attendance: 34,940; Referee: Tejas Nagvenkar; Man of the Match: Édgar Méndez (Bengaluru)

3 November 2024 7	Mumbai City	4–2	Kerala Blasters	Mumbai, Maharashtra
17:00 IST	Karelis 9', 55' (pen.); Nieff (yellow card) 25'; Nathan 75'; Chhangte 90' (pen.)	Report	Peprah (yellow card) 8' (yellow-red card) 72', (goal) 71'; Danish (yellow card) 33'; Naocha (yellow card) 55'; Jiménez 57' (pen.); Vibin (yellow card) 89'	Stadium: Mumbai Football Arena; Attendance: 6,137; Referee: Senthil Nathan; Man of the Match: Lallianzuala Chhangte (Mumbai City)

7 November 2024 8	Kerala Blasters	1–2	Hyderabad	Kochi, Kerala
17:00 IST	Jiménez 13'; Korou (yellow card) 47'; Ruivah (yellow card) 68'	Report	Alba 43', 70' (pen.); Shrivas (yellow card) 53'; Jongte (yellow card) 90+6'	Stadium: Jawaharlal Nehru Stadium; Attendance: 15,416; Referee: Surojit Das; Man of the Match: Andrei Alba (Hyderabad)

24 November 2024 9	Kerala Blasters	3–0	Chennaiyin	Kochi, Kerala
17:00 IST	Jiménez 56'; Sachin (yellow card) 59'; Noah 70', (yellow card) 90+1'; Rahul 90+2'	Report	Edwards (yellow card) 31'	Stadium: Jawaharlal Nehru Stadium; Attendance: 16,980; Referee: Tejas Nagvenkar; Man of the Match: Noah Sadaoui (Kerala Blasters)

28 November 2024 10	Kerala Blasters	0–1	Goa	Kochi, Kerala
17:00 IST		Report		Stadium: Jawaharlal Nehru Stadium; Attendance: TBD; Referee: TBD; Man of the Match: TBD

7 December 2024 11	Bengaluru	4–2	Kerala Blasters	Bangalore, Karnataka
17:00 IST		Report		Stadium: Sree Kanteerava Stadium; Attendance: TBD; Referee: TBD; Man of the Match: TBD

14 December 2024 12	Mohun Bagan	3–2	Kerala Blasters	Kolkata, West Bengal
17:00 IST		Report		Stadium: Salt Lake Stadium; Attendance: TBD; Referee: TBD; Man of the Match: TBD

22 December 2024 13	Kerala Blasters	3–0	Mohammedan	Kochi, Kerala
17:00 IST		Report		Stadium: Jawaharlal Nehru Stadium; Attendance: TBD; Referee: TBD; Man of the Match: TBD

29 December 2024 14	Jamshedpur	1–0	Kerala Blasters	Jamshedpur, Jharkhand
17:00 IST		Report		Stadium: JRD Tata Sports Complex; Attendance: TBD; Referee: TBD; Man of the Match: TBD

5 January 2025 15	Punjab	0–1	Kerala Blasters	New Delhi
17:00 IST		Report		Stadium: Jawaharlal Nehru Stadium; Attendance: TBD; Referee: TBD; Man of the Match: TBD

13 January 2025 16	Kerala Blasters	2–1	Odisha	Kochi, Kerala
17:00 IST		Report		Stadium: Jawaharlal Nehru Stadium; Attendance: TBD; Referee: TBD; Man of the Match: TBD

18 January 2025 17	Kerala Blasters	0–0	NorthEast United	Kochi, Kerala
17:00 IST		Report		Stadium: Jawaharlal Nehru Stadium; Attendance: TBD; Referee: TBD; Man of the Match: TBD

24 January 2025 18	East Bengal	2–1	Kerala Blasters	Kolkata, West Bengal
17:00 IST		Report		Stadium: Salt Lake Stadium; Attendance: TBD; Referee: TBD; Man of the Match: TBD

30 January 2025 19	Chennaiyin	1–3	Kerala Blasters	Chennai, Tamil Nadu
17:00 IST		Report		Stadium: Jawaharlal Nehru Stadium; Attendance: TBD; Referee: TBD; Man of the Match: TBD

15 February 2025 20	Kerala Blasters	0–3	Mohun Bagan	Kochi, Kerala
17:00 IST		Report		Stadium: Jawaharlal Nehru Stadium; Attendance: TBD; Referee: TBD; Man of the Match: TBD

22 February 2025 21	Goa	2–0	Kerala Blasters	Margao, Goa
17:00 IST		Report		Stadium: Jawaharlal Nehru Stadium; Attendance: TBD; Referee: TBD; Man of the Match: TBD

1 March 2025 22	Kerala Blasters	1–1	Jamshedpur	Kochi, Kerala
17:00 IST		Report		Stadium: Jawaharlal Nehru Stadium; Attendance: TBD; Referee: TBD; Man of the Match: TBD

7 March 2025 23	Kerala Blasters	1–0	Mumbai City	Kochi, Kerala
17:00 IST		Report		Stadium: Jawaharlal Nehru Stadium; Attendance: TBD; Referee: TBD; Man of the Match: TBD

12 March 2025 24	Hyderabad	1–1	Kerala Blasters	Hyderabad, Telangana
17:00 IST		Report		Stadium: G. M. C. Balayogi Athletic Stadium; Attendance: TBD; Referee: TBD; Man of the Match: TBD

=== Super Cup ===
Round of 16
20 April
8	Kerala Blasters	2
9	East Bengal	0
21 April
2	Goa	3
IL4	Gokulam Kerala	0
21 April
7	Odisha	0
10	Punjab	3
23 April
3	Bengaluru	1 (3)
IL2	Inter Kashi (p)	1 (5)
23 April
6	Mumbai City	4
11	Chennaiyin	0
24 April
4	Northeast United	6
13	Mohammedan	0
24 April
5	Jamshedpur	2
12	Hyderabad	0

Quarter-finals
26 April
8	Kerala Blasters	1
1	Mohun Bagan	2
26 April
2	Goa	2
10	Punjab	1
27 April
IL2	Inter Kashi	0
6	Mumbai City	1
27 April
4	Northeast United	0 (4)
5	Jamshedpur (p)	0 (5)

Semi-finals
30 April
1	Mohun Bagan	1
2	Goa	3
30 April
6	Mumbai City	0
5	Jamshedpur	1

Final
3 May
2	Goa	3
5	Jamshedpur	0

20 April 2025 Round of 16	Kerala Blasters	2–0	East Bengal	Bhubaneswar
20:00 IST (UTC+5:30) (Rescheduled) (Note: The original time for this match was UTC 16:30. After Mohun Bagan vs Churchill Brothers match was cancelled, the match was rescheduled.)	Jiménez 40' (pen.); Sadaoui 64'	AIFF; I-League; PDF		Stadium: Kalinga Stadium; Attendance: 4,367; Referee: Aditya Purkayastha; Man of the Match: Noah Sadaoui (Kerala Blasters)

26 April 2025 Quarter-finals	Kerala Blasters FC	1–2	Mohun Bagan	Bhubaneswar, Odisha, India
16:30 IST (UTC+05:30)	Sreekuttan M S 90+4'; Milos Drincic (yellow card) 89'	AIFF; I-League	Sahal Abdul Samad 22'; Suhail 51'; Ashique Kuruniyan (yellow card) 45'; Saurabh Bhanwala (yellow card) 90+5'	Stadium: Kalinga Stadium; Attendance: 1,103; Referee: Venkatesh Ramachadran; Man of the Match: Salahudheen Adnan (Mohun Bagan SG)

== Statistics ==
All stats are correct as of 25 November 2024

=== Squad appearances and goals ===
Note: This list includes every contracted Blasters' players.

No.	Pos	Nat	Player	Total		Super League		Super Cup		Durand Cup	
No.	Pos	Nat	Player	Apps	Goals	Apps	Goals	Apps	Goals	Apps	Goals
Goalkeepers
1	GK	(India) IND	Sachin Suresh	19	0	16+0	0	2+0	0	0+1	0
2	GK	(India) IND	Nora Fernandes	4	0	3+0	0	0+0	0	0+1	0
31	GK	(India) IND	Som Kumar	8	0	4+0	0	0+0	0	4+0	0
31	GK	(India) IND	Kamaljit Singh	1	0	1+0	0	0+0	0	0+0	0
Defenders
3	DF	(India) IND	Sandeep Singh	21	0	17+3	0	0+0	0	0+1	0
4	DF	(India) IND	Ruivah Hormipam	23	0	13+5	0	2+0	0	2+1	0
12	DF	(India) IND	Muhammed Saheef	9	0	2+1	0	0+2	0	3+1	0
15	DF	(Montenegro) MNE	Miloš Drinčić	27	1	19+2	1	2+0	0	4+0	0
20	DF	(India) IND	Pritam Kotal	17	0	11+3	0	0+0	0	2+1	0
21	DF	(India) IND	Bikash Yumnam	5	0	0+3	0	2+0	0	0+0	0
27	DF	(India) IND	Aibanbha Dohling	17	0	7+5	0	0+2	0	3+0	0
29	DF	(France) FRA	Alexandre Coeff	14	1	10+3	1	0+0	0	0+1	0
33	DF	(India) IND	Prabir Das	1	0	0+1	0	0+0	0	0+0	0
50	DF	(India) IND	Naocha Singh	28	1	22+0	0	2+0	0	2+2	1
94	DF	(Montenegro) MNE	Dušan Lagator	9	1	4+3	1	2+0	0	0+0	0
Midfielders
6	MF	(India) IND	Freddy Lallawmawma	22	1	11+6	1	0+1	0	4+0	0
8	MF	(India) IND	Vibin Mohanan	22	0	16+4	0	2+0	0	0+0	0
10	MF	(Uruguay) URU	Adrián Luna	27	0	20+2	0	1+0	0	4+0	0
13	MF	(India) IND	Danish Farooq	25	1	13+7	1	2+0	0	3+0	0
17	MF	(India) IND	Saurav Mandal	0	0	0+0	0	0+0	0	0+0	0
18	MF	(India) IND	Bryce Miranda	2	0	0+0	0	0+0	0	0+2	0
22	MF	(India) IND	Yoihenba Meitei	6	0	1+2	0	0+0	0	1+2	0
25	MF	(India) IND	Korou Singh	17	2	15+2	2	0+0	0	0	0
32	MF	(India) IND	Mohammed Azhar	9	1	1+5	0	0+0	0	1+2	1
47	MF	(India) IND	Ebindas Yesudasan	1	0	0+0	0	0+1	0	0+0	0
97	MF	(India) IND	R. Lalthanmawia	11	0	3+8	0	0+0	0	0+0	0
Forwards
7	MF	(India) IND	Rahul K. P.	11	1	6+5	1	0+0	0	0+0	0
9	FW	(Spain) ESP	Jesús Jiménez	20	12	15+3	11	2+0	1	0+0	0
14	FW	(Ghana) GHA	Kwame Peprah	29	10	13+10	6	0+2	0	4+0	4
19	FW	(India) IND	Mohammed Aimen	15	2	5+5	0	1+0	0	3+1	2
26	FW	(India) IND	Ishan Pandita	4	2	1+2	0	0+0	0	0+1	2
45	FW	(India) IND	Sreekuttan MS	3	1	0+0	0	0+2	1	0+1	0
77	FW	(Morocco) MAR	Noah Sadaoui	25	14	15+4	7	2+0	1	4+0	6

=== Squad statistics ===
Factors		League	Super Cup	Durand Cup	Total
Games played		9	0	4	13
Games Won		3	0	2	5
Games Drawn		2	0	1	3
Games Lost		4	0	1	5
Goals scored		15	0	16	31
Goals scored	Per-game	1.66	0	4	2.38
Goals scored	In first-half	4	0	9	13
Goals scored	In second-half	11	0	7	18
Goals Conceded		16	0	2	18
Goals Conceded	Per-game	1.77	0	0.5	1.38
Goals Conceded	In first-half	7	0	1	8
Goals Conceded	In second-half	9	0	1	10
Goal Difference		-1	0	+14	+13
Clean Sheets		1	0	2	3
Goals by Substitutes		4	0	3	7
Yellow Cards		23	0	2	25
Red Cards		1	0	0	1

Players Used: 26

Source: FootyStats, World Football

=== Goalscorers ===
Rank	Nation	Name	No.	Position(s)	Played	League	Super Cup	Durand Cup	Total	Per game	Goal %
1	(Morocco)	Noah Sadaoui	77	LW	11	4	0	6	10	0.90	90.91%
2	(Spain)	Jesús Jiménez	9	CF	9	7	0	0	7	0.77	77.78%
2	(Ghana)	Kwame Peprah	14	ST	12	3	0	4	7	0.58	58.33%
4	(India)	Ishan Pandita	26	CF	1	0	0	2	2	2.00	200%
4	(India)	Mohammed Aimen	19	CF/LW	9	0	0	2	2	0.22	22.22%
6	(India)	Mohammed Azhar	32	CM	7	0	0	1	1	0.14	14.29%
6	(India)	Rahul K. P.	7	RW/CF	8	1	0	0	1	0.12	12.5%
6	(India)	Naocha Singh	50	LB	12	0	0	1	1	0.08	8.33%
Total						15	0	16	31		

Source: Indian Super League

=== Assist ===
Rank	Nation	Name	No.	Position(s)	Played	League	Super Cup	Durand Cup	Total	Per game	Assist %
1	(Morocco)	Noah Sadaoui	77	LW	11	3	0	2	5	0.45	45.45%
2	(India)	Mohammed Aimen	19	CF/LW	9	2	0	2	4	0.44	44.44%
2	(Uruguay)	Adrián Luna	10	AM/LW/CM/CF	11	2	0	2	4	0.36	36.36%
2	(Ghana)	Kwame Peprah	14	ST	12	0	0	4	4	0.33	33.33%
5	(India)	Korou Singh	25	LM/LW	3	2	0	0	2	0.66	66.67%
5	(India)	Danish Farooq Bhat	13	LM	10	0	0	2	2	0.20	20%
5	(India)	Naocha Singh	50	LB	12	2	0	0	2	0.16	16.67%
8	(India)	Yoihenba Meitei	22	CM	3	0	0	1	1	0.33	33.33%
8	(India)	Aibanbha Dohling	27	LB/CB	5	0	0	1	1	0.20	20%
8	(Spain)	Jesús Jiménez	9	CF	9	1	0	0	1	0.11	11.11%
8	(India)	Pritam Kotal	20	CB/RB	11	1	0	0	1	0.09	9.09%
Total						13	0	14	27		

Source: Indian Super League

=== Hat-tricks ===
Rank	Nation	Name	No.	Position	Against	Result	Date	Competition	Refs.
1	(Morocco)	Noah Sadaoui	77	LW	(India) Mumbai City FC	0–8 (N)	2 August 2024	Durand Cup	
1	(Morocco)	Noah Sadaoui	77	LW	CISF Protectors	7–0 (N)	10 August 2024	Durand Cup	
2	(Ghana)	Kwame Peprah	14	ST	(India) Mumbai City FC	0–8 (N)	2 August 2024	Durand Cup	

=== Goal contributions ===
Note: The following table ranks the players based on their goal contributions during the 2024–25 campaign.

Rank	Nation	Player	Position(s)	Goals	Assists	Total
1	(Morocco)	Noah Sadaoui	LW	13	7	20
2	(Ghana)	Kwame Peprah	ST	8	4	12
3	(Spain)	Jesús Jiménez	CF	10	1	11
4	(India)	Mohammed Aimen	CF/LW	2	4	6
5	(Uruguay)	Adrián Luna	AM/LW/CM/CF	0	4	4
6	(India)	Korou Singh	LB	0	4	'4
7	(India)	Naocha Singh	CF	1	2	3
7	(India)	Ishan Pandita	LM	2	0	2
7	(India)	Danish Farooq	LM/LW	0	2	2
10	(India)	Mohammed Azhar	CM	1	0	1
10	(India)	Aibanbha Dohling	LB/CB	0	1	1
10	(India)	Yoihenba Meitei	CM	0	1	1
10	(India)	Pritam Kotal	CB/RB	0	1	1
10	(India)	Rahul K. P.	RW/CF	1	0	1

=== Clean-sheets ===
Rank	Nation	Name	No.	League	Super Cup	Durand Cup	Total
1	(India)	Som Kumar	31	0	0	2	2
2	(India)	Nora Fernandes	2	0	0	1	1
2	(India)	Sachin Suresh	1	1	0	0	1

Source: Indian Super League

=== Disciplinary record ===
No.	Position(s)	Nation	Name	League			Super Cup			Durand Cup			Total		
No.	Position(s)	Nation	Name	Yellow card	Second yellow card	Red card	Yellow card	Second yellow card	Red card	Yellow card	Second yellow card	Red card	Yellow card	Second yellow card	Red card
15	CB/LB	(Montenegro)	Miloš Drinčić	1	–	–	–	–	–	1	0	0	2	0	0
50	LB	(India)	Naocha Singh	3	–	–	–	–	–	1	0	0	4	0	0
20	CB/RB	(India)	Pritam Kotal	1	–	–	–	–	–	0	0	0	1	0	0
5	LB	(India)	Muhammed Saheef	1	–	–	–	–	–	0	0	0	1	0	0
7	RW/CF	(India)	Rahul K. P.	1	–	–	–	–	–	0	0	0	1	0	0
6	CDM	(India)	Freddy Lallawmawma	1	–	–	–	–	–	0	0	0	1	0	0
32	CM	(India)	Mohammed Azhar	2	–	–	–	–	–	0	0	0	2	0	0
29	CB/CDM	(France)	Alexandre Coeff	2	–	–	–	–	–	0	0	0	2	0	0
14	ST	(Ghana)	Kwame Peprah	1	1	–	–	–	–	0	0	0	1	1	0
10	AM/LW/CM/CF	(Uruguay)	Adrián Luna	2	–	–	–	–	–	0	0	0	2	0	0
31	GK	(India)	Som Kumar	1	–	–	–	–	–	0	0	0	1	0	0
13	CDM	(India)	Danish Farooq Bhat	2	–	–	–	–	–	0	0	0	2	0	0
8	CM	(India)	Vibin Mohanan	1	–	–	–	–	–	0	0	0	1	0	0
4	CB	(India)	Hormipam Ruivah	1	–	–	–	–	–	0	0	0	1	0	0
25	LM/LW	(India)	Korou Singh	1	–	–	–	–	–	0	0	0	1	0	0
1	GK	(India)	Sachin Suresh	1	–	–	–	–	–	0	0	0	1	0	0
77	LW	(Morocco)	Noah Sadaoui	1	–	–	–	–	–	0	0	0	1	0	0
Total				23	1	–	–	–	–	2	0	0	25	1	0

Source: World Football

=== Captains ===
Note: The following table mentions all the players that donned the captain's armband for the Blasters throughout the season across all competitions.

Rank	No.	Position(s)	Player	League	Super Cup	Durand Cup	Total	Ref.
1	10	AM/LW/CM/CF	(Uruguay) Adrián Luna	5	0	4	9	
2	15	CB/LB	(Montenegro) Miloš Drinčić	4	0	0	4	
3	20	RB	(India) Pritam Kotal	0	0	0	0	N/A

=== Suspensions ===
Note: This table includes all suspensions that were concluded during this season, as well as the suspensions that was concluded during this season.

Suspension Date	Name	For	Total Matches	Return Date	Refs.
TBD

=== Matchday Statistics ===
Matches held in neutral stadium

S.No.	Matchday No.	Against	Date	Formation	Possession	Shots on Goal	Shot Attempts	Fouls	Yellow Cards	Red Cards	Corner Kicks	Saves	Attendance (Out of 39,000)	Refs.
Indian Super League
1	Matchday 1	Punjab FC	15 September 2024	4-2-3-1	58%	4	6	11	5	0	1	1	17,498/19,500 (Note: During this matchday, the club reduced their stadium capacity by 50% due to the Onam celebrations across the state of Kerala.)	
2	Matchday 2	East Bengal FC	22 September 2024	4-3-3	46%	2	10	10	1	0	3	3	24,911	
3	Matchday 3	NorthEast United FC	29 September 2024	4-3-3	59%	5	14	11	2	0	7	1	Away	
4	Matchday 4	Odisha FC	3 October 2024	4-2-3-1	49%	3	16	9	0	0	9	3	Away	
5	Matchday 5	Mohammedan SC	20 October 2024	4-3-3	56%	4	10	10	4	0	6	1	Away	
6	Matchday 6	Bengaluru FC	25 October 2024	3-4-1-2	57%	6	15	17	4	0	5	0	34,940	
7	Matchday 7	Mumbai City FC	3 November 2024	3-4-1-2	55%	2	14	9	3	1	4	1	Away	
8	Matchday 8	Hyderabad FC	7 November 2024	4-2-3-1	65%	2	15	11	2	0	8	1	15,416	
9	Matchday 9	Chennaiyin FC	24 November 2024	4-2-3-1	62%	4	17	14	2	0	4	2	16,980	
10	Matchday 10	FC Goa	28 November 2024	TBD									TBD	TBD
11	Matchday 11	Bengaluru FC	7 December 2024	TBD									Away	TBD
12	Matchday 12	Mohun Bagan SG	14 December 2024	TBD									Away	TBD
13	Matchday 13	Mohammedan SC	22 December 2024	TBD									TBD	TBD
14	Matchday 14	Jamshedpur FC	29 December 2024	TBD									Away	TBD
15	Matchday 15	Punjab FC	5 November 2025	TBD									Away	TBD
16	Matchday 16	Odisha FC	13 January 2025	TBD									TBD	TBD
17	Matchday 17	NorthEast United FC	18 January 2025	TBD									TBD	TBD
18	Matchday 18	East Bengal FC	24 January 2025	TBD									Away	TBD
19	Matchday 19	Chennaiyin FC	30 January 2025	TBD									Away	TBD
20	Matchday 20	Mohun Bagan SG	15 February 2025	TBD									TBD	TBD
21	Matchday 21	FC Goa	22 February 2025	TBD									Away	TBD
22	Matchday 22	Jamshedpur FC	1 March 2025	TBD									TBD	TBD
23	Matchday 23	Mumbai City FC	7 March 2025	TBD									TBD	TBD
24	Matchday 24	Hyderabad FC	12 March 2025	TBD									Away	TBD
Super League total				N/A	56.33% (Note: Mentions the average possession held across the league matches.)	32	117	102	23	1	47	13	109,745 (Note: Mentions the average home game attendances across the league matches.)	
Indian Super Cup
1	TBD			TBD									TBD	TBD
2	TBD			TBD									TBD	TBD
3	TBD			TBD									TBD	TBD
Super Cup total				N/A	TBD (Note: Mentions the average possession held across the Super Cup matches.)	TBD	TBD	TBD	TBD	TBD	TBD	TBD	TBD (Note: Mentions the average home attendances of the Blasters across the Super Cup, where the team was designated as 'Team-A'.)	
Durand Cup
1	Matchday 5	Mumbai City FC	1 August 2024	4-3-3	65%	13	25	8	0	0	12	0	Team-B	
2	Matchday 8	Punjab FC	4 August 2024	4-4-2	55%	3	12	6	0	0	8	4	351	
3	Matchday 14	CISF Protectors	10 August 2024	4-3-3	63%	11	35	5	0	0	11	3	346	
4	Quarter-final	Bengaluru FC	23 August 2024	4-3-3	38%	3	8	16	2	0	4	6	Team-B	
Durand Cup total				N/A	55.2% (Note: Mentions the average possession held across the Durand Cup matches.)	30	80	35	2	0	35	13	697 (Note: Mentions the average home attendances of the Blasters across the Durand Cup, where the team was designated as 'Team-A'.)	
Grand total				N/A	55.76% (Note: Mentions the average possession held across all competitions .)	62	197	137	25	1	82	26	110,442 (Note: Mentions the average home attendances of the Blasters across all competitions.)	

=== Most minutes ===
Note: The following table mentions the top-eleven players with most minutes under their belt during this season.

Rank	Player	League	Super Cup	Durand Cup	Total
1	(Morocco) Noah Sadaoui	585'	0'	360'	945'
2	(India) Naocha Singh	720'	0'	210'	930'
3	(Montenegro) Miloš Drinčić	549'	0'	333'	882'
4	(India) Pritam Kotal	643'	0'	225'	868'
5	(Uruguay) Adrián Luna	479'	0'	345'	824'
6	(India) Vibin Mohanan	750'	0'	0'	750'
7	(Spain) Jesús Jiménez	730'	0'	0'	730'
8	(India) Sandeep Singh	686'	0'	33'	719'
9	(India) Danish Farooq Bhat	371'	0'	270'	641'
10	(Ghana) Kwame Peprah	303'	0'	307'	610'

Source: Competitions

=== Longest serving players ===
Note: The following table mentions the top-ten longest serving players in the Blasters' senior squad until the end of this season.

Rank	Name	Since	Duration	Refs.
1	(India) Rahul K. P.	20 June 2019	7 years, 144 days	
2	(India) Sandeep Singh	22 August 2020	6 years, 81 days	
3	(India) Hormipam Ruivah	8 April 2021	5 years, 217 days	
4	(Uruguay) Adrián Luna	22 July 2021	5 years, 132 days	
5	(India) Sachin Suresh	2 November 2021	5 years, 9 days	
6	(India) Saurav Mandal	23 June 2022	4 years, 141 days	
7	(India) Vibin Mohanan	17 August 2022	4 years, 86 days	
7	(India) Mohammed Aimen	17 August 2022	4 years, 86 days	
7	(India) Mohammed Azhar	17 August 2022	4 years, 86 days	
10	(India) Danish Farooq Bhat	31 January 2023	3 years, 284 days	

=== International call-ups ===
Note: The following table consists of the Blasters' players (excluding the players who departed the club permanently or on loan) who were called up for their countries' senior and junior squads for the international fixtures during the season.

National team	Player	Pos.	Debut	Caps	Goals	Latest call-up	Tournament	Refs.
India	(India) Jeakson Singh (Note: Jeakson is present in this list as a result of the club announcing his departure following his international call-up, and his subsequent international appearances.)	CDM	25 March 2021	21	0	23 May 2024	2026 FIFA World Cup Qualifiers (Probables); 2026 FIFA World Cup Qualifiers	
India	(India) Vibin Mohanan	CM	9 September 2023	0	0	4 May 2024	2026 FIFA World Cup Qualifiers (Probables)	
India	(India) Rahul K. P.	RW/CF	24 September 2022	6	0	4 May 2024	2026 FIFA World Cup Qualifiers (Probables)	
Lithuania	(Lithuania) Fedor Černych (Note: Černych is present in this list as a result of the club announcing his departure following his international call-up.)	RW/LW/SS	14 November 2012	91	15	30 May 2024	2024 Baltic Cup	
India U20	(India) Korou Singh	CM	Maiden call-up	0	0	14 August 2024	2024 SAFF U-20 Championship (Probables); 2024 SAFF U-20 Championship	
India	(India) Vibin Mohanan	CM	Maiden call-up	0	0	5 November 2024	International Friendly vs Malaysia (Probables); International Friendly vs Malaysia	
Reserves
India U20	(India) Ebindas Yesudas	CM	Maiden call-up	0	0	14 August 2024	2024 SAFF U-20 Championship (Probables); 2024 SAFF U-20 Championship	
India U20	(India) Thomas Cherian	CB	Maiden call-up	0	0	14 August 2024	2024 SAFF U-20 Championship (Probables); 2024 SAFF U-20 Championship	

=== Injury record ===
No.	Pos.	Nat.	Name	Type	Status	Source	Match	Inj. Date	Ret. Date
11	FW	(Australia)	Jaushua Sotirio	Achilles tendon rupture		KBFC.in	in pre-season camp in 2023–24 season	16 July 2023	2024–25 pre-season
27	DF	(India)	Aibanbha Dohling	ACL tear		ISL.com	vs Mumbai City FC in 2023–24 season	8 October 2023	1 August 2024
14	FW	(Ghana)	Kwame Peprah	Groin injury		BRIDGE.in	vs Jamshedpur FC in the 2024 Indian Super Cup	15 January 2024	1 August 2024
31	GK	(India)	Sachin Suresh	Shoulder injury		KBFC (X.COM)	vs Chennaiyin FC in 2023–24 season	16 February 2024	3 August 2024
11	FW	(Australia)	Jaushua Sotirio	Unknown injury		KBFC.in	in pre-season camp	July 2024	TBD
8	FW	(India)	Vibin Mohanan	Unknown injury		KBFC.in	in pre-season camp	July 2024	15 September 2024
31	GK	(India)	Som Kumar	Head injury		KBFC (X.COM)	vs Bengaluru FC in the 2024 Durand Cup	23 August 2024	20 October 2024
27	DF	(India)	Aibanbha Dohling	Knee injury		KBFC (X.COM)	during training	September 2024	2025

- Player is injured
- Player has recovered from injury
Last updated: 24 October 2024
Source: Kerala Blasters FC

== Seasonal awards ==
=== Durand Cup ===
- 2024 Durand Cup Golden Boot: (Morocco) Noah Sadaoui

== Club awards ==
=== Indian Super League ===
==== Player of the Match ====
Note: The Indian Super League Player of the Match awards are awarded after each matchday to the players by the league based on their performances on that day.

Matchday No.	Nat.	Player	Opponent	Date	Refs.
Matchday 2	(Morocco)	Noah Sadaoui (1)	(India) East Bengal FC	22 September 2024	
Matchday 3	(Morocco)	Noah Sadaoui (2)	(India) NorthEast United FC	29 September 2024	
Matchday 4	(Morocco)	Noah Sadaoui (3)	(India) Odisha FC	3 October 2024	
Matchday 5	(Morocco)	Noah Sadaoui (4)	(India) Mohammedan SC	20 October 2024	
Matchday 9	(Morocco)	Noah Sadaoui (5)	(India) Chennaiyin FC	24 November 2024	

==== Team of the Matchweek ====
Note: The Indian Super League Team of the Matchweek awards are awarded after each matchday to the players by the league based on their performances on that matchweek.

Matchweek No.	Nat.	Player/Manager	Opponent	Refs.
Matchweek 2	(Morocco)	Noah Sadaoui (1)	(India) East Bengal FC	
Matchweek 3	(Morocco)	Noah Sadaoui (2)	(India) NorthEast United FC	
Matchweek 4	(Morocco)	Noah Sadaoui (3)	(India) Odisha FC	
Matchweek 5	(India) (Spain) (Sweden)	Vibin Mohanan (1); Jesús Jiménez (1); Manager: Mikael Stahre (1)	(India) Mohammedan SC	

==== Goal of the Week ====
Note: The Indian Super League Goal of the Week awards are awarded after each matchweek to the players by the league based on a fan-expert voting system.

Matchweek No.	Nat.	Player	Score	Opponents	Date	Refs.
Matchweek 2	(Morocco)	Noah Sadaoui (1)	1–1 (2–1)	(India) East Bengal FC	22 September 2024	
Matchweek 3	(Morocco)	Noah Sadaoui (2)	1–1 (1–1)	(India) NorthEast United FC	29 September 2024	
Matchweek 4	(Spain)	Jesús Jiménez (1)	0–2 (2–2)	(India) Odisha FC	3 October 2024	

=== Durand Cup ===
==== Player of the Match ====
Note: The Durand Cup Player of the Match awards is awarded after each matchday to the players by the Durand Cup based on their performances on that day.

Matchday No.	Nat.	Player	Opponent	Date	Refs.
Matchday 5	(Morocco)	Noah Sadaoui (1)	(India) Mumbai City FC	1 August 2024	
Matchday 8	(India)	Freddy Lallawmawma (1)	(India) Punjab FC	4 August 2024	
Matchday 14	(Morocco)	Noah Sadaoui (2)	CISF Protectors	10 August 2024	

=== Club ===
==== Fans' Player of the Month ====
Note: The KBFC Fans' Player of the Month award is awarded after each month to the players by the club as chosen by the fans via a poll.

Month	Nat.	Player	Refs.
September	(Morocco)	Noah Sadaoui (1)	
October	(Ghana)	Kwame Peprah (1)	
November	TBD	TBD	N/A
December	TBD	TBD	N/A
January	TBD	TBD	N/A
February	TBD	TBD	N/A
March	TBD	TBD	N/A

==== Fans' Goal of the Month ====
Note: The KBFC Fans' Goal of the Month award is awarded after each month to the players by the club as chosen by the fans via a poll.

Month	Nat.	Player	Score	Opponent	Refs.
September	(Morocco)	Noah Sadaoui (1)	1–1 (2–1)	(India) East Bengal FC	
October	(Ghana)	Kwame Peprah (1)	1–1 (1–2)	(India) Mohammedan SC	
November	TBD	TBD	TBD	TBD	N/A
December	TBD	TBD	TBD	TBD	N/A
January	TBD	TBD	TBD	TBD	N/A
February	TBD	TBD	TBD	TBD	N/A
March	TBD	TBD	TBD	TBD	N/A

== Milestones ==
All stats are correct as of 3 October 2024

Keys
Final score	The score at full-time; Blasters' listed first.	No.	Squad number	Pos.	Position
Opponent	The opponent team without a flag is English.	(N)	The game was played at a neutral site.		
(H)	The Blasters were the home team.	(A)	The Blasters were the away team.		
Player^{*}	Player who joined the Blasters permanently or on loan during the season				
Player^{†}	Player who departed the Blasters permanently or on loan during the season				
Player^{#}	Player from the Blasters's reserve's squad				

=== Players ===
==== Debuts ====
Note: The following players made their competitive debuts for the Blasters' first team during the campaign.

Win Draw Loss

As of 15 September 2024

Date	No.	Pos.	Player	Final score	Opponent	Competition	Refs.
1 August 2024	77	LW	(Morocco) Noah Sadaoui	8–0 (N)	(India) Mumbai City FC	Durand Cup	
1 August 2024	31	GK	(India) Som Kumar	8–0 (N)	(India) Mumbai City FC	Durand Cup	
10 August 2024	2	GK	(India) Nora Fernandes	7–0 (N)	CISF Protectors	Durand Cup	
10 August 2024	45	CF	(India) Sreekuttan MS	7–0 (N)	CISF Protectors	Durand Cup	
23 August 2024	29	CB/RB	(France) Alexandre Coeff	0–1 (N)	(India) Bengaluru FC	Durand Cup	
15 September 2024	9	CF	(Spain) Jesús Jiménez	1–2 (H)	(India) Punjab FC	Indian Super League	

==== First goals ====
Note: The following players scored their first goals for the Blasters first team during the campaign.

Win Draw Loss

As of 15 September 2024

Date	No.	Pos.	Player	Final score	Opponent	Competition	Refs.
1 August 2024	77	LW	(Morocco) Noah Sadaoui	8–0 (N)	(India) Mumbai City FC	Durand Cup	
1 August 2024	26	CB	(India) Ishan Pandita	8–0 (N)	(India) Mumbai City FC	Durand Cup	
10 August 2024	50	LB	(India) Naocha Singh	7–0 (N)	CISF Protectors	Durand Cup	
10 August 2024	32	CM	(India) Mohammed Azhar	7–0 (N)	CISF Protectors	Durand Cup	
15 September 2024	9	CF	(Spain) Jesús Jiménez	1–2 (H)	(India) Punjab FC	Indian Super League	

==== First assists ====
Note: The following players registered their first assists for the Blasters' first team during the campaign.

Win Draw Loss

As of 25 November 2024

Date	No.	Pos.	Player	Final score	Opponent	Competition	Refs.
1 August 2024	27	LB/CB	(India) Aibanbha Dohling	8–0 (N)	(India) Mumbai City FC	Durand Cup	
1 August 2024	22	CM	(India) Yoihenba Meitei	8–0 (N)	(India) Mumbai City FC	Durand Cup	
10 August 2024	77	AM/LW/CM/CF	(Morocco) Noah Sadaoui	7–0 (N)	CISF Protectors	Durand Cup	
15 September 2024	20	CB/RB	(India) Pritam Kotal	1–2 (H)	(India) Punjab FC	Indian Super League	
22 September 2024	50	LB	(India) Naocha Singh	2–1 (H)	(India) East Bengal FC	Indian Super League	
3 October 2024	9	CF	(Spain) Jesús Jiménez	2–2 (A)	(India) Odisha FC	Indian Super League	
7 November 2024	25	LM/LW	(India) Korou Singh	1–2 (H)	(India) Hyderabad FC	Indian Super League	

=== Historical ===
The following table lists the historical achievements of the club, and the Blasters' players during the season.

Player/Club	Event	Date	Match	Tournament	Refs.
Kerala Blasters FC	Set a new club record for the highest win in their history, as well as equaling the tournament record for the biggest win, with an 8–0 victory.	1 August 2024	(India) Mumbai City FC	Durand Cup	
(Morocco) Noah Sadaoui	Became the first Kerala Blasters player to record multiple hat-tricks in a single season and the first to achieve multiple hat-tricks for the club.	1 August 2024; 10 August 2024	(India) Mumbai City FC; CISF Protectors FT	Durand Cup	
(India) Korou Singh	Became the youngest player to register an assist in the league's history at the age of 17 years, 11 months and 4 days.	7 November 2024	(India) Hyderabad FC	Indian Super League	

== See also ==
- Kerala Blasters FC
- List of Kerala Blasters FC seasons
- Indian Super League
- 2024–25 Indian Super League season
