= Som Kumar =

Indian footballer (born 2005)

Personal information
- Date of birth: 27 February 2005 (age 21)
- Place of birth: Bangalore, India
- Height: 1.91 m (6 ft 3 in)
- Position: Goalkeeper

Team information
- Current team: Slovan
- Number: 16

Youth career
- 2018: Bengaluru
- 2018–2019: Boca Juniors Academy
- 2019–2020: BYFL Academy
- 2020–2021: Bravo
- 2021–2022: Krka
- 2022: Bravo
- 2022–2023: Krka
- 2023–2024: Olimpija Ljubljana

Senior career*
Years	Team	Apps	(Gls)
2024–2025	Kerala Blasters	4	(0)
2025–2026	Radomlje	0	(0)
2025–2026	→ Slovan (loan)	0	(0)
2026–	Slovan	13	(0)

International career
2020–2022	India U17	11	(0)
2023–2024	India U20	4	(0)
- * Club domestic league appearances and goals as of 20:47, 8 March 2026 (UTC)

Som Kumar (born 27 February 2005) is an Indian professional footballer who plays as a goalkeeper for Slovenian Second League club Slovan.

== Club career ==
=== Early and youth career ===
Som Kumar began his playing career in hometown Bangalore, at the age of 13. In 2018, he appeared with U13 side of Bengaluru. He then played for Boca Juniors U-13, and BYFL Academy team. Kumar's competitive club career began in 2020, when he travelled to Slovenia. At first, he signed with U17 team of NK Bravo. With Bravo, he took part in an U15 summer tournament in Italy. In that competition, he became prominent in a match against Bologna U17 in their 1–1 draw, in which he saved multiple penalties. He was then loaned out to another NextGen Liga club NK Krka, signing with their U17 team. He helped the team achieving third place in the league. He later appeared with U19 teams of both NK Bravo and NK Krka until moving to Olimpija Ljubljana.

In February 2023, Som signed a contract with U19 side of NK Olimpija Ljubljana. He joined the team as their third-choice goalkeeper in mid-season transfer. After training with an Indian club, he joined Olimpija Ljubljana denying a move to the Indian Super League, stating "That was a good experience for me; it helped me understand how an ISL team works, and they offered me a contract. It's nothing that I have against the club or the ISL, but at the moment, I think my focus is to stay in Europe and train in Europe." He made his official league debut on 28 July, against NK Aluminij. He soon became regular starter for the club after showcasing his goalkeeping abilities in 2022–23 NextGen Liga. He also made it to the team's UEFA European Under-19 Championship squad, alongside friendly tour to Austria in June. In July, Som was called up to the senior squad, but remained uncapped in Slovenian PrvaLiga.

=== Kerala Blasters ===
In June 2024, Som was signed by the Indian Super League club Kerala Blasters on a four-year deal, till 2028. He was the first Blasters' signing under new coach Mikael Stahre. Som made his senior debut on 1 August with Kerala Blasters in the 2024 Durand Cup match against Mumbai City FC, where he kept a clean-sheet as the Blasters won the match with a record-breaking score of 8–0. He then kept two more consecutive clean sheets against Punjab and CISF Protectors. On 23 August, in the Durand Cup quarter finals against Bengaluru, Som collided with Bengaluru striker Jorge Pereyra Díaz within eight seconds into the game, resulting in a head injury and was stretchered off after sustaining a severe cut. Som made his Indian Super League debut on 20 October in a 2–1 win against Mohammedan Sporting.

=== Radomlje ===
On 3 February 2025, Slovenian PrvaLiga club Radomlje announced that they had signed a contract with Kumar. He made his debut for the club on 6 July in a friendly match against Croatian side HNK Hajduk Split.

=== ND Slovan ===
On 8 September 2025, Kumar joined Slovenian Second League club ND Slovan on loan from Radomlje for the remainder of the first half of the 2025–26 season. After returning to Radomlje following the expiry of his loan in January 2026, he completed a permanent transfer to ND Slovan on 27 February 2026.

== International career ==
Som is a former member of both Indian national under-16 and under-17 teams. He was part of India under-16 team's tour to the United Arab Emirates, in which he appeared in their 4–2 win against Sharjah U18 on 36 January 2021, coming as a substitute for Lionel Daryl Rymmei on 62nd minute. He later earned call-up to the Shanmugam Venkatesh managed India under-20 team to participate at the 2022 SAFF U-20 Championship in Odisha. He made crucial saves in their semi-final win against the Maldives. At the final on 5 August, they clinched title defeating Bangladesh 5–2. He won best goalkeeper award in that edition.

Som was also included in India's 2023 AFC U-20 Asian Cup qualification squad. They travelled to Kuwait in October, faced Australia, Iraq and Kuwait, winning a single match, against hosts. He also being called up for international friendlies vs Brazil,Uruguay and Panama in 2026

== Personal life ==
Som was born and grew up in Bangalore. His parents Vivek Kumar and Shama Kittur, both are former national-level badminton players.

== Career statistics ==
Club	Season	Division	League Apps	League Goals	Cup Apps	Cup Goals	Other Apps	Other Goals	Total Apps	Total Goals
Kerala Blasters	2024–25	Indian Super League	4	0	0	0	4	0	8	0
Kerala Blasters	Total	—	4	0	0	0	4	0	8	0
NK Radomlje	2025–26	Slovenian PrvaLiga	0	0	0	0	2	0	2	0
NK Radomlje	Total	—	0	0	0	0	2	0	2	0
ND Slovan	2025–26	Slovenian Second League	12	0	1	0	0	0	13	0
ND Slovan	Total	—	12	0	1	0	0	0	13	0

== Honours ==
NK Krka U-17

- NextGen Liga third place: 2021–22

India U-20

- SAFF U-20 Championship: 2022, 2023

Individual

- SAFF U-20 Championship Best Goalkeeper: 2022

== See also ==
- List of Indian expatriate footballers
