= Korou Singh Thingujam =

Indian footballer

Korou Singh
Personal information
- Full name: Korou Singh Thingujam
- Date of birth: 3 December 2006 (age 19)
- Place of birth: Chairel Manjil, Manipur, India
- Height: 1.67 m (5 ft 6 in)
- Positions: Winger; attacking midfielder; centre forward

Team information
- Current team: Kerala Blasters
- Number: 25

Youth career
- 2020–2023: Sudeva Delhi

Senior career*
Years	Team	Apps	(Gls)
2023–2024	Kerala Blasters B	18	(8)
2024–	Kerala Blasters	25	(2)

International career^{‡}
2021-2023	India U17	16	(4)
2024–	India U20	6	(4)
2025–	India U23	3	(0)
- * Club domestic league appearances and goals as of 18 October 2026 ‡ National team caps and goals as of 20:10, 10 October 2025 (UTC)

Korou Singh Thingujam (Meitei: Thingujam Korou Singh, born 3 December 2006) is an Indian professional footballer who plays as a winger for Indian Super League club Kerala Blasters.

== Club career ==
=== Early life and career ===
Born in Manipur to a family of farmers, Korou began his youth career with the under-18 division of Sudeva Delhi FC, after capitalizing on a youth contract following a successful trials with the club in Imphal. In 2021, Korou was named in Sudeva's squad for the 2021 Durand Cup, and started in their first group stage match against Jamshedpur FC on 6 September, which they lost 1–0. He started again in the next match on 13 September against FC Goa, where he had an improved role in the game, but Sudeva lost yet again (2–1) by a single goal deficit resulting in their elimination from the tournament.

Korou also represented them in the 2021–22 FD Senior Division, and scored a goal in their 3–1 win over Delhi United FC on 30 October 2021, which earned him the man of the match award. Korou also had a brief stint with the Sudeva's futsal team, where he represented them in the 2021–22 Futsal Club Championship, and scored his first goal of the tournament against Classic FA on 8 November 2021 in a 6–1 defeat. He would then go on to score a brace in his final match for the futsal team in the tournament on 10 November against Real Kashmir, as Sudeva won the match 9–5 at full-time. Korou would then leave Sudeva Delhi in 2023 after he was signed by the Indian Super League club Kerala Blasters FC.

=== Kerala Blasters ===
In August 2023, Korou was signed by the Indian Super League club Kerala Blasters FC following his performance in the 2023 AFC U-17 Asian Cup, on an undisclosed transfer fee. He was initially registered for the club's reserve team, whom he would represent in the 2023–24 Kerala Premier League. He made his debut for the reserve team in the same tournament against Kerala Police on 26 November 2023, in which he scored his debut goal in the 46th minute but the Blasters' went down 1–2 in the campaign opener. Korou scored his second of the tournament against MK Sporting Club on 13 December, where he scored in the 70th minute as the Blasters won the match with a high margin of 8–0.

Whilst playing for the reserves, Korou was called up for the Blasters' senior-team's camp in Kolkata for 2024 Indian Super Cup tournament. He made it to the squad for the club's match against Jamshedpur FC on 15 January 2024, but was benched for the entirety of the match. However, his senior-team debut would come on the next matchday on 20 January against NorthEast United FC, where he came in as a substitute for the Japanese midfielder Daisuke Sakai in the 77th minute, but the Blasters lost the match 1–4 at full-time. At 17 years and 47 days, he became the youngest player to make a senior team debut for the Blasters, a record previously held by Dheeraj Singh. Korou made his Indian Super League debut for the club on 6 April in a 2–0 loss against NorthEast United by coming as a substitute in the 77th minute. On 7 November, he provided his first assist for the club against Hyderabad and became the youngest player in the Indian Super League to provide an assist. On 30 January 2025, Korou scored his first goal for the Blasters against Chennaiyin FC, helping them in a 3–1 win. This also made him the youngest goalscorer for the club and the second youngest goalscorer in Indian Super League at the age of 18 years and 58 days. He scored his second goal in the league against Jamshedpur FC on 1 March, which ended in 1–1 draw.

== International career ==
=== Youth ===
On 1 September 2022, Korou was called up for India U-17 squad for the 2022 SAFF U-17 Championship. He then made his under-17 debut against Bhutan U-17 on 5 September 2022, which they won 0–3. Korou would score his debut goal in the tournament's final on 14 September against Nepal U-17, where he scored in the 30th minute to double the lead, as India won the final 4–0 at full-time, thus helping the nation to lift their fourth SAFF U-17 title. Korou then travelled to Oman for the under-17's preparatory friendly match ahead of the 2023 AFC U-17 Asian Cup qualifiers, and started in the match against Oman U-17, where his performance was applauded as India won the match by the score of 1–3. He scored his second goal for the junior team against Kuwait U-17 on 5 October 2022 in the 2023 AFC U-17 Asian Cup qualifiers, where he scored the second goal of the match in the 66th minute, as India took the three points with a 3–0 win. Korou was then called up for the under-17 squad that travelled to Ballari, Karnataka, to play three friendlies against Bengaluru FC U-18s, in which he scored one goal each in the last two friendlies on 15 and 18 December. Korou captained the Indian side for the first time in a friendly match against Qatar U-17 on 28 February 2023, where he scored the final goal for India in the injury-time of the second-half, as the Blue Colts won the match 3–0 at full-time. He was then called up for the under-17 squad that travelled to Spain and Germany to play preparatory friendlies ahead of the 2023 AFC U-17 Asian Cup. During their Spanish tour, Korou would score once and provide two assists in their 1–4 win over Atlético Madrid U-16 on 19 April 2023, and would then score India's only goal in their 1–3 defeat on 10 May against Getafe CF U-18s, before heading to Germany for the rest of the European tour. On 30 May, Korou was named in the 23-member squad that travelled to Thailand for the 2023 AFC U-17 Asian Cup, and was subsequently announced as the captain of the Indian side for the tournament by the coach Bibiano Fernandes. He started in all three group stage matches, and then scored in India's last match of the tournament against Japan U-17 on 23 June 2023, where he scored India's fourth goal of the match in the 79th, but the match ended with India losing by an 8–4 defeat.

== Personal life ==
Born in the village of Chairel Mangjil in Manipur, Korou started playing football at the age of nine. His parents, who were farmers, died after being washed away by the high tides of a nearby river when Korou was just ten years old, and following which he lived in his cousins' household in Chairel Mangjil. He has also expressed his admiration for the England international Phil Foden, whom he considers as his favourite football player.

== Career statistics ==
=== Club ===
As of matches played till 11 October 2026

Club	Season	League			Cup		AFC		Other		Total	
Club	Season	Division	Apps	Goals	Apps	Goals	Apps	Goals	Apps	Goal	Apps	Goals
Sudeva Delhi FC	2021–22	I-League	0	0	0	0	–		2	0	2	0
Kerala Blasters FC B	2023–24	Kerala Premier League	8	2	0	0	–		–		8	2
Kerala Blasters FC	2023–24	Indian Super League	1	0	1	0	–		–		2	0
Kerala Blasters FC	2024-25	Indian Super League	17	2	0	0	-		-		17	2
Kerala Blasters FC	2025-26	Indian Super League	3	0	3	1	-		-		6	1
Kerala Blasters FC	2026-27	Indian Super League	1	0	0	0	-		-		1	0
Career total			30	4	4	1	–		2	0	36	5

== Honours ==
India U17

- SAFF U-17 Championship: 2022
