= Yoihenba Meitei Sukham =

Indian footballer

Yoihenba Meitei
Personal information
- Full name: Yoihenba Meitei Sukham
- Date of birth: 7 February 2004 (age 22)
- Place of birth: Thoubal, Manipur, India
- Height: 1.75 m (5 ft 9 in)
- Position: Central midfielder

Team information
- Current team: Kerala Blasters
- Number: 22

Youth career
- 2017–2018: NEROCA
- 2018–2020: Kerala Blasters B

Senior career*
Years	Team	Apps	(Gls)
2020–2024	Kerala Blasters B	7	(0)
2023–2026	Kerala Blasters	5	(0)
2026–	Karbi Anglong Morning Star FC	0	(0)
- * Club domestic league appearances and goals as of 13:30, 15 September 2024 (UTC)

Yoihenba Meitei Sukham (Meitei: Sukham Yoihenba Meitei, born 7 February 2004) is an Indian professional footballer who plays as a midfielder for the Assam State Premier League club Karbi Anglong Morning Star FC.

== Club career ==
=== Early life and career ===
Born in Thoubal, Manipur, Yoihenba started his youth career with the under-16 division of NEROCA FC, whom he represented in the U15 Hero Junior League in 2017. He would then sign for the U15 team of the Indian Super League side Kerala Blasters FC, whom he represented in the 2019 Hero Junior League and the Subroto Cup, before signing to the reserve side of Kerala Blasters.

=== Kerala Blasters ===
==== 2018–2024: Kerala Blasters reserves and senior team debut ====
Yoihenba signed his first senior contract for the reserves team of the Indian Super League side Kerala Blasters FC. He was then included in the Blasters' reserve squad that played the 2020–21 Kerala Premier League. Under the new senior team gaffer Ivan Vukomanović, Yoihenba was one among the six reserve team players that was called up for 2021 pre-season camp of Kerala Blasters, and was then named in the Blasters' squad for the 2021 Durand Cup by Vukomanović. He also represented the reserves in the 2021–22 Kerala Premier League season. During the 2023–24 season, Yoihenba was chosen in the Blasters' reserves' squad for the 2023 Reliance Foundation Development League's national phase, and was again called up for the pre-season camp, and 2023 Durand Cup squad. After making it to the senior squad for the 2023–24 Indian Super League season, his senior career debut would come against Mohun Bagan Super Giant on 27 December 2023, where he came in as a substitute for Mohammed Azhar in the injury time of the second half and played just one minute, as the Blasters would win the match 0–1 at full-time.

==== 2024–2026: Rise to the first team and contract extension ====
On 14 September 2024, Kerala Blasters announced that Yoihenba has signed a new contract with the club, that would keep him with them until 2027 with an option to extend.

== International career ==
Yoihenba was called up for the India under-15 national team on 25 July 2019 for the preparatory friendlies in Thailand for the 2020 AFC U-16 Championship qualifiers, and played his first match against Bangkok Glass FC on 30 July 2019, which they won 4–2. He assisted for Sridarth Nongmeikapam goal against Assumption United FC on the final match of the preparatory friendlies on 9 August 2019, as India won the match by the score of 2–0. On 19 November 2020, Yoihenba was called up for the India under-16's training camp in Goa as a part of the preparation for the 2020 AFC U-16 Championship.

== Career statistics ==
=== Club ===
As of matches played till 31 December 2023

Club	Season	League			Cup		AFC		Other		Total	
Club	Season	Division	Apps	Goals	Apps	Goals	Apps	Goals	Apps	Goals	Apps	Goals
Kerala Blasters FC B	2023	RF Development League	4	0	–		–		–		4	0
Kerala Blasters FC	2023–24	Indian Super League	2	0	2	0	–		–		4	0
Kerala Blasters FC	2024–25	Indian Super League	1	0	0	0	–		3	0	4	0
Kerala Blasters FC	Kerala Blasters total		3	0	2	0	–		3	0	8	0
Career total			7	0	2	0	–		3	0	12	0
