= Aibanbha Dohling =

Indian professional footballer

Personal information
- Full name: Aibanbha Kupar Dohling
- Date of birth: 23 March 1996 (age 30)
- Place of birth: Sohra, Meghalaya, India
- Height: 1.76 m (5 ft 9 1/2 in)
- Positions: Left back; right back; centre back

Team information
- Current team: Kerala Blasters
- Number: 27

Youth career
- Shillong Lajong
- 2011–2015: Tata FA

Senior career*
Years	Team	Apps	(Gls)
2016–2019	Shillong Lajong	25	(1)
2019–2023	Goa	44	(2)
2023–	Kerala Blasters	28	(0)
- * Club domestic league appearances and goals as of 18 October 2026

Aibanbha Kupar Dohling (born 23 March 1996) commonly known as Aiban, is an Indian professional footballer who plays as a defender for Indian Super League club Kerala Blasters. Primarily a left-back, he is also capable of playing as a centre-back.

== Club career ==
=== Early career ===
Born in Sohra, Meghalaya, Aiban started his career in the youth ranks of Shillong Lajong. He was a part of the under-15 side that qualified for the final rounds of the Manchester United Premier Cup in 2010. Aiban then moved to the Tata Football Academy in 2011. While with Tata FA, Aiban played for the academy in various tournaments, including the I-League U19. He also represented Jharkhand in the Santosh Trophy.

After impressing for Tata against Bengaluru FC's under-19 side in the under-19 league, Aiban was offered a trial with the I-League club.

=== Shillong Lajong ===
On 4 January 2016, it was announced that Aiban returned to his former club, Shillong Lajong, before the I-League season. He made his professional debut for the club on 17 February 2016 against Mohun Bagan. He came on as an 83rd-minute substitute as Shillong Lajong drew the match 1–1. In the seasons that followed, Aiban became an essential part of Lajong's system and was also appointed the club's second captain ahead of the I-League 2018–19 season. He made 19 appearances for the club that season.

=== FC Goa ===
On 26 July 2019, Indian Super League club FC Goa confirmed the signing of Aiban, after a successful season with Shillong Lajong. He only made one appearance in the Indian Super League during the 2019–20 season, which limited his game time. Aiban then would go on to make further appearances in the 2020–21 and 2021–22 seasons. Aiban also won the 2019–20 Indian Super League Premiers and the 2021 Durand Cup with the club. He totally made 44 league appearances for the club across four seasons, scoring two goals besides having numerous assists.

=== Kerala Blasters ===
On 29 August 2023, Kerala Blasters announced the signing of Aiban on a three-year deal with an option to extend one more year. The Blasters reportedly paid FC Goa a reported fee of ₹1.45 crores for the transfer of Aiban, making it the most expensive signing in its history. He made his debut for the club on 21 September, in the season opener against Bengaluru FC at home, which the Blasters won 2–1. In the first away game of the season against Mumbai City on 8 October, Aiban was substituted in the 41st minute of the match after suffering an injury. On 11 October, the Blasters announced that the injury is expected to keep him out for the rest of the season.

Aiban would make his return to the pitch in the next season for the club's first competitive match of season in the 2024 Durand Cup match against Mumbai City FC on 1 August, which the Blasters won with a record-breaking score of 8–0.

== Career statistics ==
=== Club ===
As of matches finished till 11 October 2026

Club	Season	League			Cup		AFC		Other		Total	
Club	Season	Division	Apps	Goals	Apps	Goals	Apps	Goals	Apps	Goals	Apps	Goals
Shillong Lajong	2015–16	I-League	1	0	0	0	–		–		1	0
Shillong Lajong	2016–17	I-League	5	1	0	0	–		–		5	1
Shillong Lajong	2017–18	I-League	19	0	0	0	–		–		19	0
Shillong Lajong	Total		25	1	0	0	–				25	1
Goa	2019–20	Indian Super League	1	0	0	0	–		–		1	0
Goa	2020–21	Indian Super League	8	0	0	0	1 (Note: Appearances in the AFC Champions League)	0	–		9	0
Goa	2021–22	Indian Super League	16	1	0	0	–		6 (Note: Appearances in the Durand Cup)	0	22	1
Goa	2022–23	Indian Super League	19	1	2	0	–				19	1
Goa	2023	Indian Super League	0	0	0	0	–		2	0	2	0
Goa	Total		44	2	2	0	1	0	8	0	53	2
Kerala Blasters	2023–24	Indian Super League	3	0	0	0	–		0	0	3	0
Kerala Blasters	2024–25	Indian Super League	12	0	0	0	–		2	0	14	0
Kerala Blasters	2025–26	Indian Super League	9	0	0	0	–		0	0	9	0
Kerala Blasters	2026–27	Indian Super League	1	0	0	0	–		0	0	1	0
Kerala Blasters	Total		25	0	0	0	–		2	0	27	0
Career total			94	3	2	0	1	0	10	0	107	3

== Honours ==
Goa

- Indian Super League Premiers: 2019–20
- Durand Cup: 2021
