= 2021–22 Sudeva Delhi FC season =

2021–2022 Sudeva Delhi football season

Sudeva Delhi
2021–22 season
- President: Anuj Gupta
- Head coach: Chencho Dorji
- Highest home attendance: N/A
- Lowest home attendance: N/A
- Average home league attendance: N/A

The 2021–22 season is the 7th season of Sudeva Delhi Football Club in existence and 2nd season in I-League.

== Team ==
=== First-team squad ===
Note: Flags indicate national team as defined under FIFA eligibility rules; some limited exceptions apply. Players may hold more than one non-FIFA nationality.

| No. | Pos. | Nation | Player |
|---|---|---|---|
| 3 | DF | IND | Augustin Fernandes |
| 4 | DF | IND | Lalliansanga Renthlei |
| 5 | DF | IND | Gursimrat Singh Gill |
| 6 | DF | IND | Ngaraipam Kasomwung |
| 7 | MF | IND | Pintu Mahata |
| 9 | FW | IND | Manvir Singh |
| 11 | MF | IND | Vanlalzahawma |
| 12 | FW | IND | Shaiborlang Kharpan |
| 13 | DF | IND | Akashdeep Singh Kahlon |
| 15 | DF | IND | Mohit Singh |
| 16 | MF | IND | William Pauliankhum |
| 17 | MF | IND | Mohit Mittal |
| 18 | MF | IND | Sinam Maicheal Singh |
| 19 | DF | IND | Sairuat Kima |
| 21 | MF | IND | Ngangbam Naocha |
| 22 | FW | IND | Phairembam Rostam Singh |

| No. | Pos. | Nation | Player |
|---|---|---|---|
| 32 | MF | IND | Lunkim Seigoulun Khongsai |
| 35 | GK | IND | Sachin Jha |
| 36 | GK | IND | Ashish Sibi |
| 77 | MF | IND | Ansh Gupta |
| 99 | MF | IND | Ishan Rozario |
| — | FW | IND | Shubho Paul |
| — | MF | IND | Vanlaltlankima Blakmawla |
| — | MF | IND | Abhijith Elippatta |
| — | MF | IND | Aryav Sharma |
| — | MF | IND | Aneesudheen Abdul Azeez |
| — | DF | IND | Amandeep P Singh |
| — | MF | IND | Tarun Taneja |
| — | MF | IND | Vikram Singh Gill |
| — | MF | IND | Akbar Khan |

== Transfers ==
=== Transfers in ===
| Date | Player | Position | No. | Last Club | Fee | Ref. |
|---|---|---|---|---|---|---|
| 1 August 2021 | (India) Shaiborlang Kharpan | FW | 12 | (India) Kerala Blasters | Free transfer | |
| 1 September 2021 | (India) Akbar Khan | MF | | (India) Gokulam Kerala FC | Free transfer | |

=== Transfers out ===
| Exit Date | Player | Position | No. | To | Fee | Ref. |
|---|---|---|---|---|---|---|
| 30 March 2021 | (India) Naorem Mahesh Singh | FW | 33 | (India) Kerala Blasters FC | Loan Return | |
| 30 March 2021 | (India) Ajay Singh | FW | 10 | (India) NEROCA | Free transfer | |
| 30 March 2021 | (India) Johny K.v.I Muanpuia | MF | | | Released | |
| 30 March 2021 | (India) Suji Kumar M | MF | | | Released | |
| 30 March 2021 | (India) Amandeep | MF | | | Released | |
| 30 March 2021 | (India) R. Lallawmawma | MF | | | Released | |
| 30 March 2021 | (India) Waris Rashid | MF | | | Released | |
| 30 March 2021 | (India) Gopi Kannan | MF | | | Released | |
| 30 March 2021 | (India) H Lalhmingchhuanga | MF | | | Released | |
| 30 March 2021 | (India) Eddie Fung | MF | | | Released | |
| 30 March 2021 | (India) Wallace J Martins | DF | | | Released | |
| 30 March 2021 | (India) Sanjib Das | MF | | | Released | |
| 30 March 2021 | (India) Anirban Yadav | GK | | | Released | |
| 30 May 2021 | (India) Ayush Chhikara | FW | 33 | (India) Mumbai City FC | Loan Return | |
| 1 July 2021 | (India) Kamal Choudhary | DF | 14 | (India) Rajasthan United FC | Free transfer | |
| 3 July 2021 | (India) Lalramhmunmawia | DF | 39 | (India) Mohammedan | Free transfer | |
| 9 July 2021 | (India) Rakshit Dagar | GK | 40 | (India) Gokulam Kerala FC | Free transfer | |
| 2 August 2021 | (India) Kean Lewis | MF | 8 | (India) Punjab FC | Free transfer | |
| 30 August 2021 | (India) Lovepreet Singh | GK | 1 | (India) Delhi | Free transfer | |
| 1 September 2021 | (India) Prashant Narayan Choudhary | DF | 20 | (India) Rajasthan United FC | Free transfer | |

== Technical staff ==
| Position | Name |
|---|---|
| Head coach | (Bhutan) Chencho Dorji |
| Assistant Coach | (India) Pushpender Kundu |
| Technical Director | (Nigeria) Afolabi Rabiu |
| Physiotherapist | (India) Mohammed Arshak. AT |
| Coach U18 | (Nigeria) Hakim Ssegendo |
| Coach U15 | (India) PS Lalngaihzuala |
| Coach U13 | (Nigeria) Franklin Onalega |

=== Overview ===
| Competition | First match | Last match | Final position | Record | | | | | | | |
| Competition | First match | Last match | Final position | Pld | W | D | L | GF | GA | GD | Win % |
|---|---|---|---|---|---|---|---|---|---|---|---|
| I League | TBD | TBD | | 0 | 0 | 0 | 0 | 0 | 0 | +0 | — |
| Durand Cup | 12 September 2021 | 17 September 2021 | | 3 | 0 | 0 | 3 | 1 | 4 | −3 | 0.00 |
| Super Cup | TBD | TBD | - | 0 | 0 | 0 | 0 | 0 | 0 | +0 | — |
| Total | | | | 3 | 0 | 0 | 3 | 1 | 4 | −3 | 0.00 |

Last updated: 23 September 2021.
Source: Competitions

== I-League ==
=== League table ===
| Pos | Team | Pld | W | D | L | GF | GA | GD | Pts | Qualification |
|---|---|---|---|---|---|---|---|---|---|---|
| 9 | TRAU | 12 | 3 | 3 | 6 | 12 | 15 | −3 | 12 | Relegation stage |
| 10 | Aizawl | 12 | 4 | 0 | 8 | 15 | 19 | −4 | 12 | Relegation stage |
| 11 | Sudeva Delhi | 12 | 2 | 4 | 6 | 9 | 16 | −7 | 10 | Relegation stage |
| 12 | Indian Arrows | 12 | 2 | 3 | 7 | 6 | 20 | −14 | 9 | Relegation stage |
| 13 | Kenkre | 12 | 0 | 2 | 10 | 6 | 24 | −18 | 2 | Relegation stage |

Source: Hero I-League
Rules for classification: 1) points; 2) head-to-head points; 3) head-to-head goal difference; 4) goal difference; 5) number of goals scored; 6) drawing of lots

| Pos | Team | Pld | W | D | L | GF | GA | GD | Pts | Qualification |
|---|---|---|---|---|---|---|---|---|---|---|
| 1 | Gokulam Kerala | 18 | 13 | 4 | 1 | 44 | 15 | +29 | 43 | Champions and qualification for the play–offs for 2023–24 AFC Cup group stage spot |
| 2 | Mohammedan | 18 | 11 | 4 | 3 | 34 | 18 | +16 | 37 | |
| 3 | Sreenidi Deccan | 18 | 9 | 5 | 4 | 27 | 19 | +8 | 32 | |
| 4 | Churchill Brothers | 18 | 9 | 3 | 6 | 24 | 22 | +2 | 30 | |
| 5 | RoundGlass Punjab | 18 | 8 | 4 | 6 | 33 | 29 | +4 | 28 | |
| 6 | Rajasthan United | 18 | 5 | 7 | 6 | 16 | 16 | 0 | 22 | |
| 7 | NEROCA | 18 | 4 | 8 | 6 | 21 | 30 | −9 | 20 | |

Source: Hero I-League
Rules for classification: 1) points; 2) head-to-head points; 3) head-to-head goal difference; 4) goal difference; 5) number of goals scored; 6) drawing of lots

| Pos | Team | Pld | W | D | L | GF | GA | GD | Pts |
|---|---|---|---|---|---|---|---|---|---|
| 2 | TRAU | 17 | 4 | 6 | 7 | 15 | 17 | −2 | 18 |
| 3 | Indian Arrows | 17 | 4 | 5 | 8 | 10 | 23 | −13 | 17 (Note: Head-to-head standings: Indian Arrows 4 points, Sudeva Delhi 1 point.) |
| 4 | Sudeva Delhi | 17 | 4 | 5 | 8 | 13 | 23 | −10 | 17 |
| 5 | Real Kashmir | 17 | 2 | 8 | 7 | 23 | 31 | −8 | 14 |
| 6 | Kenkre | 17 | 3 | 3 | 11 | 11 | 25 | −14 | 12 |

Source: Hero I-League
Rules for classification: 1) points; 2) head-to-head points; 3) head-to-head goal difference; 4) goal difference; 5) number of goals scored; 6) drawing of lots
Notes:

| Pos | Team | Pld | W | D | L | GF | GA | GD | Pts |
|---|---|---|---|---|---|---|---|---|---|
| 9 | TRAU | 17 | 4 | 6 | 7 | 15 | 17 | −2 | 18 |
| 10 | Indian Arrows | 17 | 4 | 5 | 8 | 10 | 23 | −13 | 17 |
| 11 | Sudeva Delhi | 17 | 4 | 5 | 8 | 13 | 23 | −10 | 17 |
| 12 | Real Kashmir | 17 | 2 | 8 | 7 | 23 | 31 | −8 | 14 |
| 13 | Kenkre | 17 | 3 | 3 | 11 | 11 | 25 | −14 | 12 |

Source: Hero I-League
Rules for classification: 1) points; 2) head-to-head points; 3) head-to-head goal difference; 4) goal difference; 5) number of goals scored; 6) drawing of lots

=== League Results by round ===
| Round | 1 | 2 | 3 | 4 | 5 | 6 | 7 | 8 | 9 | 10 | 11 | 12 | 13 | 14 | 15 | 16 | 17 | 18 | 19 | 20 |
|---|---|---|---|---|---|---|---|---|---|---|---|---|---|---|---|---|---|---|---|---|
| Result | | | | | | | | | | | | | | | | | | | | |
| League Position | | | | | | | | | | | | | | | | | | | | |

Updated to match(es) played on 19 January 2021. Source: Matchday
W = Win; D = Draw; L = Loss

=== Group B ===
| Pos | Team | Pld | W | D | L | GF | GA | GD | Pts | Qualification |
|---|---|---|---|---|---|---|---|---|---|---|
| 1 | Goa | 3 | 3 | 0 | 0 | 9 | 1 | +8 | 9 | Knockout stage |
| 2 | Army Green | 3 | 2 | 0 | 1 | 4 | 3 | +1 | 6 | Knockout stage |
| 3 | Jamshedpur | 3 | 1 | 0 | 2 | 2 | 8 | −6 | 3 | |
| 4 | Sudeva Delhi | 3 | 0 | 0 | 3 | 1 | 4 | −3 | 0 | |

Rules for classification: 1) points; 2) head-to-head points; 3) head-to-head goal difference; 4) goal difference; 5) number of goals scored; 6) drawing of lots

==== Matches ====
| 6 September 2021 1 | Jamshedpur | 1–0 | Sudeva Delhi | Kolkata |
| 15.00 IST | Lalruatmawia 33'; J Singh (yellow card) 45+1'; P Singh (yellow card) 86'; Yadav (yellow card) 88' | Report | Singh (yellow card) 90+3' | Stadium: Mohun Bagan Ground; Attendance: 0 Man of the Match: Vishal Yadav (Jamshedpur FC) |

| 13 September 2021 2 | Goa | 2–1 | Sudeva Delhi | Kolkata |
| 15.00 IST | Nemil 45+2'; Fernandes (yellow card) 46'; Ortiz 80' | Report | Kima (yellow card) 18'; Vanlalzuidika (yellow card) 33'; Khan (yellow card) 80'; Pauliankhum 90+8' (pen.) | Stadium: Vivekananda Yuba Bharati Krirangan; Attendance: 0 Man of the Match: Seriton Fernandes (FC Goa) |

| 17 September 2021 3 | Army Green | 1–0 | Sudeva Delhi | Kolkata |
| 15.00 IST | Lallawmkima (yellow card) 34'; Rana (yellow card) 42'; Singh 51' | Report | Kima (yellow card) 54'; Kharpan (yellow card) 88' | Stadium: Mohun Bagan Ground; Attendance: 0 Man of the Match: Deepak Singh (Army Green) |

== Statistics ==
=== Goalscorers ===
| Name | No. | Pos. | 2021–22 I-League | Durand Cup | Super Cup | Total |
|---|---|---|---|---|---|---|
| (India) William Pauliankhum | 16 | AM | 0 | 1 | 0 | 1 |
