= Slovenian Junior League =

- Founded: 1990; 36 years ago
- Country: Slovenia
- Divisions: 1
- Number of clubs: 16
- Current champions: Bravo (2nd title) (2025–26)
- Most championships: Maribor (8 titles)
- Broadcaster(s): Sportklub
- Website: nzs.si

The Slovenian Junior League (Slovenian: Slovenska mladinska liga), currently known as the EON NextGen Liga due to sponsorship reasons, is the top level of Slovenian youth football in its age category. The league is contested among the under-19 sides of Slovenian football clubs and is governed by the Football Association of Slovenia. Maribor is the most successful team with eight titles.

== Current teams ==
As of the 2026–27 season

- Aluminij
- Beltinci
- Bravo
- Brežice 1919
- Brinje Grosuplje
- Celje
- Fužinar
- Ilirija 1911
- Jadran Dekani
- Koper
- Maribor
- Mura
- Olimpija Ljubljana
- Radomlje
- Rudar Velenje
- Triglav Kranj

== List of winners ==
Season	Champions
1990–91	Slovan
1991–92	Slovan
1992–93	Olimpija
1993–94	Mura
1994–95	Mura
1995–96	Olimpija
1996–97	Triglav Kranj
1997–98	Maribor Branik
1998–99	Olimpija
1999–2000	Mura
2000–01	Rudar Velenje
2001–02	Olimpija
2002–03	Maribor Branik
2003–04	Maribor
2004–05	Gorica
2005–06	Gorica
2006–07	Koper
2007–08	Maribor
2008–09	Interblock
2009–10	Maribor
2010–11	Maribor
2011–12	Gorica
2012–13	Gorica
2013–14	Domžale
2014–15	Domžale
2015–16	Domžale
2016–17	Triglav Kranj
2017–18	Maribor
2018–19	Domžale
2019–20	No winners
2020–21	No winners
2021–22	Domžale
2022–23	Ilirija 1911
2023–24	Maribor
2024–25	Bravo
2025–26	Bravo

Club	Titles	Years won
Maribor	8	1998, 2003, 2004, 2008, 2010, 2011, 2018, 2024
Domžale	5	2014, 2015, 2016, 2019, 2022
Olimpija	4	1993, 1996, 1999, 2002
Gorica	4	2005, 2006, 2012, 2013
Mura	3	1994, 1995, 2000
Slovan	2	1991, 1992
Triglav Kranj	2	1997, 2017
Bravo	2	2025, 2026
Rudar Velenje	1	2001
Koper	1	2007
Interblock	1	2009
Ilirija 1911	1	2023
