= Rakesh Meitei Likmabam =

Indian footballer (born 2003)

Rakesh Meitei
Personal information
- Full name: Rakesh Meitei Likmabam
- Date of birth: 6 February 2003 (age 23)
- Place of birth: Imphal, Manipur, India
- Position: Left-back

Team information
- Current team: Kerala Blasters

Youth career
- 2017-2018: NEROCA U16
- 2018–2022: Bengaluru

Senior career*
Years	Team	Apps	(Gls)
2022-2024	NEROCA	42	(0)
2024–	Kerala Blasters	0	(0)
2024–2026	→ Punjab (loan)	7	(0)
- * Club domestic league appearances and goals as of 19:00, 21 May 2026 (UTC)

Rakesh Meitei Likmabam (Meitei: Likmabam Rakesh Meitei, born 6 February 2003), is an Indian professional footballer who plays as a defender for Indian Super League club Kerala Blasters.

== Early life and career ==
Rakesh was born in Imphal, Manipur on 6 February 2003. He mainly plays as a left-back, but he is also capable to play as a centre-back.

He began his youth career by joining the NEROCA under-16 academy.

=== 2024–present - Kerala Blasters FC ===
On 18 June 2024, Indian Super League club Kerala Blasters, announced that they have signed Rakesh on a three-year contract, till 2027.
