= Lalthanmawia Renthlei =

Indian footballer (born 2002)

Personal information
- Full name: Lalthanmawia Renthlei
- Date of birth: 9 May 2002 (age 24)
- Place of birth: Aizawl, Mizoram, India
- Height: 1.71 m (5 ft 7 in)
- Position: Winger

Team information
- Current team: Samaleswari

Youth career
- 2015–2021: Aizawl

Senior career*
Years	Team	Apps	(Gls)
2021–2024	Aizawl	42	(5)
2024–2026	Kerala Blasters	11	(0)
2026–	Samaleswari	0	(0)
- * Club domestic league appearances and goals as of 15:40, 12 March 2025 (UTC)

Lalthanmawia Renthlei (born 9 May 2002), commonly known as Amawia, is an Indian professional footballer who plays as a forward for Indian Football League club Samaleswari.

== Early life and career ==
Amawia was born in Aizawl, Mizoram on 9 May 2002.

=== 2015–2024 - Aizawl FC ===
In 2015, he joined Aizawl FC under-14 academy. After six years of impressive performance in the academy, he was promoted to their senior team in 2021. He made 42 appearances for the club, scoring five goals and giving eight assists. On 14 May 2024, he announced his departure from Aizawl FC via his Instagram account, ending a nine-year stint with the club.

=== 2024–present - Kerala Blasters FC ===
On 24 June 2024, Indian Super League outfit Kerala Blasters, announced that they have signed Amawia on a three-year deal, which will keep him with the club till 2027.
