= Muhammed Saheef =

Indian football player

Personal information
- Full name: Muhammed Saheef AP
- Date of birth: 7 February 2003 (age 23)
- Place of birth: Malappuram, Kerala, India
- Height: 1.85 m (6 ft 1 in)
- Positions: Left-back; centre-back

Team information
- Current team: Chennaiyin

Youth career
- Parappur FC
- Kerala

Senior career*
Years	Team	Apps	(Gls)
2022–2023	Kerala Blasters B	4	(0)
2023–2026	Kerala Blasters	12	(0)
2023–2024	→ Gokulam Kerala (loan)	21	(0)
2026–	Chennaiyin	3	(0)

International career^{‡}
2025–	India U23	5	(0)
- * Club domestic league appearances and goals as of 26 October 2026 ‡ National team caps and goals as of 10 October 2025

Muhammed Saheef AP (born 7 February 2003) is an Indian professional footballer who plays as a defender for Indian Super League club Chennaiyin. He has represented the India U-23 football team.

== Club career ==
=== Youth and early career ===
Saheef spent his youth career with Parappur FC. He gained prominence through performances in the 2021–22 Kerala Premier League with them. Saheef was then selected by the Kerala State Team to play for them in the Santosh Trophy in the 2021–22 season and won the tournament with them.

=== Kerala Blasters ===
==== 2022–2023: Kerala Blasters reserves and senior team debut ====
Saheef was noted for his performance in the Santosh Trophy, by the scouts of Kerala Blasters, a Kochi based Indian Super League club. After the trials, he was offered his first ever professional contract by the Blasters, which he signed. Saheef was put into the club's reserve team, and played for them in the 2022–23 Kerala Premier League and the 2023 RFDL. Saheef got his first national level exposure by playing in the 2022 Durand Cup. Kerala Blasters fielded its reserve team as the primary squad for the tournament, in which Saheef was also included. He made one appearance in the tournament, by coming as a substitute against Mohammedan SC, on 9 September 2022.

In April 2023, Saheef was included in the Kerala Blasters squad for the 2023 Super Cup. He made his official Kerala Blasters senior team debut on 12 April 2023, by coming as a substitute against Sreenidi Deccan FC in the 72nd minute. Saheef also started in the game against Bengaluru FC and played for 58 minutes.

==== 2023–2024: Contract extension and loan to Gokulam ====
On 9 May 2023, Kerala Blasters announced the extension of Saheef's contract until 2026. He was then included in club's 2023 Durand Cup squad and made appearances in all the three games.

On 1 September, Kerala Blasters announced that Saheef has been loaned out to Gokulam Kerala on a season long deal to get some first team experience. He started in most of the matches for Gokulam, making 21 appearances in the 2023–24 I-League and also made one assist. Saheef also made two appearances in the 2024 Super Cup with them.

==== 2024–2026: Return to Kerala Blasters and rise to the first team ====
Saheef returned to Kerala Blasters and made his Indian Super League debut for the club on 15 September 2024 in a 1–2 loss against Punjab FC.

=== Chennaiyin FC ===
Saheef joined regional rivals Chennaiyin ahead of the 2026-27 season.

== Career statistics ==
As of match played 07 April 2024

Appearances and goals by club, season and competition
Club	Season	League			Domestic cup (Note: Includes Durand Cup, Super Cup)		Total	
Club	Season	Division	Apps	Goals	Apps	Goals	Apps	Goals
Kerala Blasters	2022-23	Super League	0	0	3 (Note: One appearance in Durand Cup; two appearances in Super Cup)	0	3	0
Kerala Blasters	2023-24	Super League	0	0	3 (Note: Appearances in Durand Cup)	0	3	0
Kerala Blasters	Total		0	0	6	0	6	0
Gokulam Kerala (loan)	2023-24	I-League	20	0	2 (Note: Appearance(s) in Super Cup)	0	22	0
Career total			20	0	8	0	28	0

== Honours ==
Kerala

- Santosh Trophy: 2021–22
