= Marcus Mergulhao =

Indian sports journalist

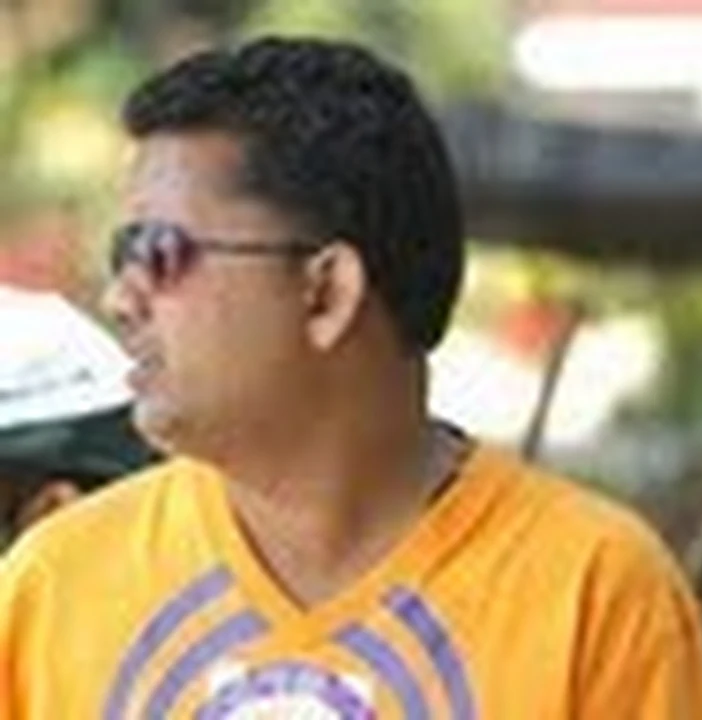
- Mergulhao during the 2010s
- Born: Anthony Marcus Mergulhao; 30 November
- Citizenship: India
- Occupation: Sports journalist
- Years active: 1999–present
- Employer: The Times of India

Anthony Marcus Mergulhao is an Indian sports journalist for The Times of India. He is best known for his coverage on the Indian Super League. In November 2023, he penned the script for a documentary featuring fellow Goan footballer Brahmanand Sankhwalkar.

== Career ==
In April 2018, former Navelim MLA Avertano Furtado assumed the presidency of the Association for the Wellbeing of Elder Sportspersons (AWES) without opposition during the organization's annual general body meeting. Alongside Ashley Furtado, Mergulhao served as an assistant general secretary within the committee.

In February 2023, at The Best FIFA Football Awards 2022, Mergulhao, known as a "trusted journalist in the country," was privileged to participate in the voting process for the women's category. When casting his votes for The Best FIFA Women's Player, Mergulhao selected Beth Mead, Sam Kerr, and Alexia Putellas. Similarly, in The Best FIFA Women's Goalkeeper category, his choices were Christiane Endler, Mary Earps, and Merle Frohms. For The Best FIFA Women's Coach, Mergulhao voted for Sarina Wiegman, Sonia Bompastor, and Pia Sundhage.

On 8 November 2023, the Chief Minister of Goa, Pramod Sawant, announced the upcoming release of a documentary named Famously Found @15 centered around the footballer Brahmanand Sankhwalkar, a football figure in the state of Goa. The documentary, under the direction of Savio Noronha, explores the key figures who have had a substantial impact on Brahmanand Sankhwalkar's career development. In the creation of the documentary, Mergulhao was responsible for developing the script, Norman Fernandes managed the cinematography, and Uday Kamat offered expertise in production.

On 16 November 2023, as a component of the National Press Day observance, Mergulhao engaged in a participatory discussion session titled "Challenges and Opportunities in Journalism in the Ever-Increasing Digital, Mobile, and Social Media Environment." The session, held at the Institute Menezes Braganza in Panjim, included other participants such as Mahesh Ghadi, a senior reporter from Prudent Media; Niraj Naik from Digital Goa; and Shripad Merchant, an associate professor at Dnyanprassarak Mandal's College.

== Personal life ==
Anthony Marcus Mergulhao was born on 30 November. He hails from the seaport city of Mormugao, Goa.

== Awards ==
On 16 November 2017, Mergulhao was honored for his significant contribution to sports reporting due to his article titled "Beginning of the end." He was a recipient of the Goa State Journalists Awards during the National Press Day function held at the Institute Menezes Braganza in Panaji. This recognition was bestowed upon him by the Department of Information and Publicity, which organized the event.

On 16 November 2020, the Goa State Journalists Awards recipients were announced by the Department of Information and Publicity, following the selection process conducted by the State Journalists Awards Committee. Mergulhao was acknowledged for his work in sport reporting, specifically for his report titled "Dumped in GFA godown." The award ceremony took place during the National Press Day function.

On 26 July 2023, Mergulhao's work was once again recognized. He was among the journalists who were honored with the Goa Union of Journalists (GUJ) awards for the years 2021 and 2022. His contributions to sports reporting earned him the award in the sports category. The award ceremony was held during the 46th GUJ Foundation Day at the Institute Menezes Braganza in Panaji.

On 16 November 2023, Mergulhao was once again named a recipient of the Goa State Journalists Awards. The State Journalists Awards Committee acknowledged his work in sports reporting for his report titled "Blinded by fate, 17-year-old champion athlete from Usgao sets sights on international stage." The award was presented during the National Press Day celebration in Panaji.

== Select bibliography ==
- Mergulhao, Marcus (18 May 2016). Footprints In The Sand: History of Salgaocar FC (1956–2016). Vasco, Goa: Salgaocar FC.
- Mergulhao, Marcus; Sarkar, Dhiman; Saxena, Siddharth (1 January 2022). Basu, Jaydeep; Mukherjee, Sayan (eds.). Box to Box: 75 years of the Indian football team. IMH. ISBN 978-8185983127.
