= 2021–22 Kerala Blasters FC season =

8th season in existence of Kerala Blasters FC

Kerala Blasters
2021–22 season
- Chairman: Nikhil Bhardwaj
- Head coach: Ivan Vukomanović
- Stadium: Tilak Maidan Stadium
- Indian Super League: 4th
- AIFF Super Cup: Cancelled
- Durand Cup: Group stage
- ISL Playoffs: Runner-up
- Top goalscorer: League: Álvaro Vázquez; Pereyra Díaz (8 each); All: Álvaro Vázquez; Pereyra Díaz (8 each)
- Average home league attendance: 🔒 Closed Doors (spectators were allowed in the finals) (Note: Due to the COVID-19 pandemic in India, the 2021–22 Indian Super League season would be held entirely in Goa, behind closed doors, and Kerala Blasters was allotted the Tilak Maidan Stadium as their home ground for the season.)
- Biggest win: 0–3 (vs Mumbai City (A), 19 December 2021, Indian Super League) (vs Chennaiyin (A), 22 December 2021, Indian Super League); 3–0 (vs Chennaiyin (H), 26 February 2022, Indian Super League)
- Biggest defeat: 3–0 (vs Jamshedpur (A), 10 February 2022, Indian Super League)
| Home colours | Away colours | Third colours |
- All statistics correct as of 20 March 2022.

The 2021–22 season was the eighth season in Kerala Blasters FC's existence, as well as their eighth season in Indian Super League. The 2021–22 Indian Super League season began on 19 November 2021, and it ended on 20 March 2022 with all the matches held in Goa across three venues, same like the previous season due to the COVID-19 pandemic in India.

The Blasters played the most number of pre-season friendlies among all ISL clubs prior to the start of league season. In this season, the Blasters made their debut in the Durand Cup by participating in the tournament's 2021 edition, but was knocked out in the group stages of the tournament. The club had a serious change in the rosters, as they appointed Ivan Vukomanović as their new manager for the season, and released all the foreign players from the last season and recruited the likes of Adrián Luna, Jorge Pereyra Díaz, Álvaro Vázquez, Enes Sipović and Chencho Gyeltshen. They also signed several young Indian players and the experienced players like Harmanjot Khabra and Karanjit Singh from the summer and winter transfer windows respectively.

The Blasters played their first match in the league in the opening match of the season against ATK Mohun Bagan, which they ended up losing 4–2. Since their defeat in the opening match of the season, the Blasters went unbeaten for the next ten matches until they were beaten by the southern rivals Bengaluru in January 2022. In between the unbeaten run, the Blasters moved to the top spot in league table for the first time in seven years during the middle of the season following their 2–0 victory over Odisha in the same month. In the same season, the Blasters qualified for the playoffs of the ISL for the first time since 2016, after the Blasters' place in the fourth position was sealed after the Mumbai City lost their deciding match against Hyderabad in the month of March. At the end of the regular season, the Blasters broke several club records like the most number of wins and clean-sheets in a season, most number of points-per-game, most number of points in a season, and ended the season with a positive goal difference for the first time in the club's history.

The Blasters played the league winners Jamshedpur in the both legs of the semi-finals. They played the first leg of the semi-final on 11 March, which the Kerala Blasters won after Sahal Abdul Samad scored the only goal in the match, as the Blasters won 0–1 at full-time. They progressed through to the finals, as the second leg ended in a 1–1 draw and the Blasters qualified with an aggregate score of 2–1 on 15 March.

Kerala Blasters met Hyderabad in the final on 20 March. The Blasters found the lead through Rahul KP's goal in the 68th minute, but Hyderabad equalised the goal in the 88th minute of the game. After the match went goalless in the injury time and the extra time, the match went to penalty shoot-out, and the Blasters lost the shoot-out by 3–1. The Blasters thus became the runner-ups for the third time in their history.

== Season overview ==
=== March, April and May ===
On 19 March 2021, Kerala Blasters announced the signing of left-back Sanjeev Stalin from Portuguese third division club C.D. Aves on a three-year deal.

On 8 April, the Blasters announced the signing of young center-back Ruivah Hormipam from I-League club Punjab FC on a three-year deal.

On 6 May, the Blasters announced the contract extension of Denechandra Meitei until 2024.

=== June ===
On 4 June, the Blasters announced the departure of Lalruatthara.

On 6 June, the Blasters announced Ritwik Das, Rohit Kumar and Shaiborlang Kharpan have left the club as their contract ran out.

On 12 June, the Blasters announced that Gary Hooper, Jordan Murray, Costa Nhamoinesu, Bakary Koné, Facundo Pereyra and Vicente Gómez, the six foreign players has left the club as their contract came to an end.

On 17 June, the Blasters roped in Ivan Vukomanović as their new head coach and Patrick Van Kets from Waasland-Beveren as the new assistant coach.

=== July ===
On 1 July, the Blasters announced SIX5SIX as the official kit and merchandise partner on a three-year deal.

On 8 July, the Blasters announced the signing of Vincy Barretto on a three-year deal for an undisclosed transfer fee.

On 10 July, the Blasters announced Werner Martens as their new strength and conditioning coach and Slaven Progoveki as their goalkeeping coach respectively.

On 15 July, the Blasters announced the signing of Harmanjot Khabra on a two-year deal.

On 21 July, the Blasters announced their 29-men squad for the pre-season camp starting on 31 July in Kochi.

On 22 July, the Blasters announced the signing of Adrián Luna as their first foreign signing of the season on a two-year deal.

On 31 July, the Blasters announced the signing of Enes Sipović on a one–year deal. He thus became the first Bosnian player to play for the club.

=== August ===
On 19 August, the Blasters announced the contract extension of Givson Singh until 2024.

On 20 August, the Blasters played their first pre-season friendly match against Kerala United FC, where they lost it 0–1.

On 24 August, the Blasters confirmed their participation in the 2021 Durand Cup. This was the club's debut Durand Cup campaign.

On 27 August, the Blasters played their second pre-season friendly match against Kerala United FC, which ended up in a 3–3 draw.

On 27 August, the Blasters announced the loan signing of Jorge Pereyra Díaz on a season long deal.

On 30 August, the Blasters announced the signing of Álvaro Vázquez on a one-year deal.

On 31 August, the Blasters announced the departure of Subha Ghosh to SC East Bengal on a season long loan deal.

On 31 August, the Blasters announced the signing of Chencho Gyeltshen as their AFC affiliated player of the season.

On 31 August, the Blasters announced the departure of Naorem Mahesh Singh to East Bengal on a season long loan deal.

=== September ===
On 1 September, the Blasters announced that they have mutually parted ways with Bilal Khan.

On 1 September, the Blasters announced their 29-men squad for the 2021 Durand Cup.

On 3 September, the Blasters played their third pre-season friendly match against J&K Bank Football Club, which they won 2–0.

On 10 September, the Blasters announced their partnership with PhonePe as their official payments partner.

On 11 September, the Blasters played their debut match in the Durand Cup against Indian Navy, which they won 0–1 after Adrián Luna netted a penalty in the 71st minute of the game.

On 13 September, the FSDL announced the fixtures for first 11 rounds of the 2021–22 Indian Super League season. Once again, it was determined that the season opener would feature a match between ATK Mohun Bagan and the Blasters.

On 14 September, the Blasters announced their extension of association with Byju's as their title sponsor of for the upcoming season.

On 15 September, the Blasters played their second match in the Durand Cup against rivals Bengaluru FC, which they lost 2–0, after going down to 8-men after a series of red cards.

On 16 September, the Blasters announced the signing of Croatian, Marko Lešković, as their last foreign player of the season on a one-year deal.

On 16 September, the Blasters announced their partnership with the Government of Kerala for operating the Sports Kerala Elite Residential Football Academy in Thiruvananthapuram on a five-year deal.

On 20 September, the Blasters launched their home-kit for the upcoming season. The jersey was a homage to the Kerala football team that won the 1973 Santosh Trophy

On 21 September, the Blasters played Delhi FC in their last match in the group stages of the 2021 Durand Cup, which they lost 1–0, resulting in their elimination from the tournament.

On 23 September, the Blasters announced their returning date to Kochi from Kolkata after their Durand Cup exit, and their plans to continue pre-season games and trainings ahead of the upcoming season.

On 26 September, the Blasters launched their away-kit for the upcoming season. The jersey was a homage to the fans of the club.

=== October ===
On 2 October, the Blasters announced rest of their friendly matches in the pre-season happening in Kochi.

On 8 October, the Blasters played their fourth pre-season friendly match against Indian Navy, which they won 2–0.

On 12 October, the Blasters played their fifth pre-season friendly match against MA Football Academy, which they won 3–0.

On 14 October, the Blasters announced rest of their fixtures in the pre-season.

On 15 October, the Blasters was supposed to play their first pre-season friendly in Goa against FC Goa, which was cancelled due to bad weather.

On 19 October, the Blasters announced their extension of association with Ather Energy as one of their official partners for the upcoming season.

On 25 October, the Blasters launched their third-kit for the upcoming season.

=== November ===
On 1 November, the Blasters played their sixth pre-season friendly match against Odisha FC, which they won 2–1.

On 2 November, the Blasters announced their squad for the 2021–22 Indian Super League season.

On 3 November, the Blasters announced their extension of association with BodyFirst as the team's official Nutrition Partner for the upcoming season.

On 5 November, the Blasters played their seventh pre-season friendly match against Chennaiyin FC, which they won 2–1.

On 9 November, the Blasters played their eighth pre-season friendly match against Jamshedpur FC, which they lost 0–3.

On 12 November, the Blasters played their final pre-season friendly match against Jamshedpur FC, which ended in a 1–1 draw.

On 13 November, the Blasters announced Jessel Carneiro as the club captain ahead of the new season.

On 14 November, the Blasters announced Stéphane van der Heyden as their assistant coach.

On 15 November, the Blasters announced Sporjo as their recruitment partner for the upcoming season.

On 16 November, the Blasters announced Exchange22 as their main sponsor for the upcoming season.

On 18 November, the Blasters announced Floki Inu as their sleeve sponsor for the upcoming season.

On 19 November, the Blasters announced Socios as their fan token partner in a multi-year partnership.

On 19 November, the Blasters played their first match of the 2021–22 Indian Super League season against ATK Mohun Bagan, which they lost 4–2.

On 22 November, the Blasters announced that Rahul K. P. would exit the bio-bubble in Goa, after he was contracted with an injury in the match against ATK Mohun Bagan.

On 25 November, the Blasters played their second match of the season against NorthEast United FC, which ended in a 0–0 draw.

On 28 November, the Blasters played their third match of the season against arch-rivals Bengaluru FC, which ended in a 1–1 draw.

=== December ===
On 4 December, the Blasters announced MOURI Tech as one of their partners for the occurring season.

On 5 December, the Blasters registered their first victory of the season against Odisha FC by a score of 2–1.

On 11 December, the Blasters announced that the goalkeeper Albino Gomes has been ruled out indefinitely due to injury that he sustained during the match against Odisha.

On 12 December, the Blasters played their fifth match of the season against SC East Bengal, which ended in a 1–1 draw.

On 13 December, the Blasters gave a statement on the complaint they filed to AIFF regarding the poor refereeing measures in the past two fixtures.

On 17 December, the Blasters provided a statement on the injuries sustained by Enes Sipović and Harmanjot Khabra.

On 19 December, the Blasters won their second game of season against defending champions Mumbai City FC with a score of 0–3.

On 20 December, the Blasters announced Suguna Foods' brand, Delfrez as their associate partner for the occurring season.

On 21 December, the Blasters announced the signing of Karanjit Singh as a replacement for the injured keeper Albino Gomes.

On 22 December, the Blasters won their third game of the season against rivals Chennaiyin FC on 22 December with a score of 0–3.

On 23 December, the Blasters announced the loan departure of Sreekuttan V. S. and Abdul Hakku to Gokulam Kerala FC for the 2021–22 I-League season.

On 26 December, the Blasters played their eight match of the season against Jamshedpur FC, which ended in a 1–1 draw.

On 29 December, the Blasters announced the loan departure of Seityasen Singh to Hyderabad FC for the rest of the season.

=== January ===
On 2 January, the Blasters played their ninth match of the season against FC Goa, which ended in a dramatic 2–2 draw.

On 9 January, the Blasters won their fourth game of the season against Hyderabad FC, which ended in a climactic 1–0 victory.

On 10 January, the Blasters gave a statement on the injury sustained by the captain Jessel Carneiro during the match against Hyderabad on the previous day.

On 11 January, the Blasters announced their association with Nestlé Munch as their official crunch partner for the occurring season.

On 12 January, the Blasters won their fifth game of the season in their second match of the season against Odisha, which they won 2–0 and reclaimed the first spot in the table.

On 16 January, the Blasters second match against Mumbai City were postponed due to the COVID-19 outbreak in the bio-bubble.

On 19 January, it was announced that the Blasters' match against ATK Mohun Bagan in the next day was postponed due to them being unable to field a team as a result of the COVID-19 outbreak in the camp.

On 30 January, the Blasters played their second game of the season against Bengaluru in the Southern Derby, which they lost 0–1, thus giving an end their 10-match unbeaten streak.

=== February ===
On 4 February, the Blasters won their sixth match of the season against NorthEast United, which ended in a dramatic 2–1 victory.

On 10 February, the Blasters played their second match of the season against Jamshedpur, which they lost 3–0.

On 12 February, the Blasters gave a statement on the injury sustained by Ruivah Hormipam during the match against Jamshedpur, two days back.

On 14 February, the Blasters won their seventh match of the season against East Bengal, which they won 1–0.

On 19 February, the Blasters played their rescheduled match against ATK Mohun Bagan, which ended in a 2–2 draw.

On 23 February, the Blasters forward Pereyra Díaz was charged with violent conduct by the All India Football Federation Disciplinary Committee for his actions after being substituted in the match against ATK Mohun Bagan four days back.

On 23 February, the Blasters played their second match of the season against Hyderabad, which they lost 2–1.

On 26 February, the Blasters won their eighth match of the season against Chennaiyin, which they won 3–0.

=== March ===
On 2 March, the Blasters defender Harmanjot Khabra was charged with violent conduct and was fined ₹1.5 lakh by the All India Football Federation Disciplinary Committee for 'hitting an opponent' in the match against Hyderabad in February.

On 2 March, the Blasters won their ninth match of the season against Mumbai City, which they won 3–1.

On 5 March, the Blasters qualified for the league playoffs for the first time since 2016 following the Mumbai City's 2–1 defeat over Hyderabad.

On 6 March, the Blasters played their last match of the regular season against Goa, which ended in a dramatic 4–4 draw.

On 11 March, the Blasters won the first leg of their semi-final match against Jamshedpur, which ended in a 0–1 victory.

On 15 March, the Blasters drew the second leg of their semi-final match against Jamshedpur, which ended in a 1–1 draw, and the Blasters qualified for the ISL finals for the first time in 6 years.

On 20 March, the Blasters played the final against Hyderabad, which they lost 3–1 in penalty shoot-out.

== Players ==
Note: The list contains all the players who were registered by the club for the 2021–22 Indian Super League season.

As of 10 January 2022

| No. | Name | Nationality | Position(s) | Date of birth (age) |
Goalkeepers
| 1 | Karanjit Singh | (India) | GK | 8 January 1986 (age 40) |
| 13 | Prabhsukhan Singh Gill | (India) | GK | 2 January 2001 (age 25) |
| 31 | Sachin Suresh | (India) | GK | 18 January 2001 (age 25) |
| 32 | Albino Gomes | (India) | GK | 7 February 1994 (age 32) |
| 78 | Muheet Shabir | (India) | GK | 7 August 2001 (age 25) |
Defenders
| 2 | Enes Sipović | (Bosnia and Herzegovina) | CB | 11 September 1990 (age 36) |
| 3 | Sandeep Singh | (India) | CB | 1 March 1995 (age 31) |
| 4 | Ruivah Hormipam | (India) | CB | 25 January 2001 (age 25) |
| 5 | Nishu Kumar | (India) | RB/LB | 5 October 1997 (age 29) |
| 14 | Jessel Carneiro (Captain) | (India) | LB | 14 July 1990 (age 36) |
| 15 | Sanjeev Stalin | (India) | LB/LW | 17 January 2001 (age 25) |
| 19 | Denechandra Meitei | (India) | LB | 28 January 1994 (age 32) |
| 26 | Abdul Hakku | (India) | CB | 6 October 1994 (age 32) |
| 34 | Bijoy Varghese | (India) | CB | 14 March 2000 (age 26) |
| 55 | Marko Lešković | (Croatia) | CB | 27 April 1991 (age 35) |
Midfielders
| 7 | Puitea | (India) | CM/RW/CDM | 30 March 1998 (age 28) |
| 8 | Ayush Adhikari | (India) | CM | 30 July 2000 (age 26) |
| 10 | Harmanjot Khabra | (India) | RB/CM | 18 December 1988 (age 32) |
| 11 | Givson Singh | (India) | CM/AM | 5 June 2001 (age 25) |
| 17 | Rahul K. P. | (India) | RW | 16 March 2000 (age 26) |
| 18 | Sahal Samad | (India) | CM/AM | 1 April 1997 (age 29) |
| 20 | Adrián Luna | (Uruguay) | AM | 12 March 1992 (age 34) |
| 22 | Seityasen Singh | (India) | RW/RM | 12 March 1992 (age 34) |
| 24 | Prasanth Karuthadathkuni | (India) | RW/RM/RB | 24 June 1997 (age 29) |
| 25 | Jeakson Singh | (India) | CDM/CB | 21 June 2001 (age 25) |
| 47 | Vincy Barretto | (India) | RW | 8 December 1999 (age 26) |
Forwards
| 30 | Jorge Pereyra Díaz | (Argentina) | ST | 5 August 1990 (age 36) |
| 77 | Chencho Gyeltshen | (Bhutan) | FW/LW | 10 May 1996 (age 30) |
| 99 | Álvaro Vázquez | (Spain) | ST | 27 April 1991 (age 35) |

== Transfers ==
=== Transfers In ===
| Date | Player | Position | No. | Last club | Fee | Ref. |
|---|---|---|---|---|---|---|
| 19 March 2021 | (India) Sanjeev Stalin | LB/LW | 15 | (Portugal) Aves | Free transfer | |
| 8 April 2021 | (India) Ruivah Hormipam | CB | 4 | (India) Punjab | Free transfer | |
| 8 July 2021 | (India) Vincy Barretto | RW | 47 | (India) Gokulam Kerala | Undisclosed fee | |
| 15 July 2021 | (India) Harmanjot Khabra | RB/DM/CM | 10 | (India) Bengaluru | Free transfer | |
| 22 July 2021 | (Uruguay) Adrián Luna | AM/SS | 20 | (Australia) Melbourne City | Free transfer | |
| 31 July 2021 | (Bosnia and Herzegovina) Enes Sipović | CB | 2 | (India) Chennaiyin | Free transfer | |
| 27 August 2021 | (Argentina) Jorge Pereyra Díaz | ST | 30 | (Argentina) Atlético Platense | Loan transfer | |
| 30 August 2021 | (Spain) Álvaro Vázquez | ST | 99 | (Spain) Sporting de Gijón | Free transfer | |
| 31 August 2021 | (Bhutan) Chencho Gyeltshen | FW/LW | 77 | (India) Punjab | Free transfer | |
| 16 September 2021 | (Croatia) Marko Lešković | CB | 55 | (Croatia) Dinamo Zagreb | Free transfer | |
| 21 December 2021 | (India) Karanjit Singh | GK | 1 | (India) Chennaiyin | Free transfer | |

=== Loan Returns ===
| Position | No. | Player | From |
|---|---|---|---|
| FW | 23 | (India) Naorem Mahesh Singh | (India) Sudeva Delhi |

=== Promoted from Kerala Blasters FC Reserves ===
| No. | Name | Nationality | Position(s) | Date of birth (age) | Ref. |
|---|---|---|---|---|---|
| 31 | Sachin Suresh | (India) | GK | 18 January 2001 (age 25) | |
| 34 | Bijoy Varghese | (India) | CB | 14 March 2000 (age 26) | |

=== Contract Extensions ===
| No | Player | Position | Contract Till | Ref. |
|---|---|---|---|---|
| 45 | (India) Denechandra Meitei | LB | 2024 | |
| 11 | (India) Givson Singh | AM | 2024 | |

=== Loan Outs ===
| Position | No. | Player | To | Ref. |
|---|---|---|---|---|
| CF | 49 | (India) Subha Ghosh | (India) East Bengal | |
| CF | 23 | (India) Naorem Mahesh Singh | (India) East Bengal | |
| RW | 33 | (India) Sreekuttan V. S. | (India) Gokulam Kerala | |
| CB | 26 | (India) Abdul Hakku | (India) Gokulam Kerala | |
| RW | 22 | (India) Seityasen Singh | (India) Hyderabad | |

=== Transfers Out ===
| Exit Date | Player | Position | No. | To | Fee | Ref. |
|---|---|---|---|---|---|---|
| 4 June 2021 | (India) Lalruatthara | LB/RB | 39 | (India) Odisha | Free transfer | |
| 6 June 2021 | (India) Ritwik Das | RW | 23 | (India) Jamshedpur | Free transfer | |
| 6 June 2021 | (India) Rohit Kumar | CM/DM | 13 | (India) Bengaluru | Free transfer | |
| 6 June 2021 | (India) Shaiborlang Kharpan | FW | 19 | (India) Sudeva Delhi | Free transfer | |
| 11 June 2021 | (Argentina) Facundo Pereyra | AM/SS | 10 | (Argentina) CA Estudiantes | Free transfer | |
| 11 June 2021 | (Spain) Vicente Gómez Umpiérrez | DM | 4 | (Greece) Xanthi | Free transfer | |
| 11 June 2021 | (Burkina Faso) Bakary Koné | CB | 3 | Free Agent | Free transfer | |
| 11 June 2021 | (Australia) Jordan Murray | FW | 25 | (India) Jamshedpur | Free transfer | |
| 11 June 2021 | (Zimbabwe) Costa Nhamoinesu | CB/LB | 26 | (Poland) Podbeskidzie Bielsko-Biała | Free transfer | |
| 11 June 2021 | (England) Gary Hooper | FW | 88 | (New Zealand) Wellington Phoenix | Free transfer | |
| 1 September 2021 | (India) Bilal Khan | GK | 1 | (India) Real Kashmir | Free transfer | |

== Management ==
As of 14 November 2021

| Role | Name | Refs. |
|---|---|---|
| Head Coach/Manager | (Serbia) Ivan Vukomanović | |
| Assistant Coach | (Belgium) Stéphane van der Heyden | |
| Assistant Coach | (India) Ishfaq Ahmed | |
| Strength and conditioning coach | (Belgium) Werner Martens | |
| Goalkeeping Coach | (Serbia) Slaven Progovecki | |
| Reserves & U18 Head Coach | (India) T. G. Purushothaman | |
| Scouting Head | (India) Ishfaq Ahmed | |

== Pre-season and friendlies ==
In July, the Blasters announced their squad for the pre-season camp in Kochi.

Win Draw Loss Cancelled

| 20 August 2021 Friendly | (India) Kerala Blasters | 0–1 | (India) Kerala United | Kochi, Kerala |
| 16:00 IST | | Report | Bujair 42' | Stadium: Panampilly Nagar Ground; Attendance: Closed doors |

| 27 August 2021 Friendly | (India) Kerala Blasters | 3–3 | (India) Kerala United | Kochi, Kerala |
| 16:00 IST | Sreekuttan 12'; Ghosh 18'; Adhikari 71' | Report | Bujair 15'; Shafnad 53'; Adarsh 69' | Stadium: Panampilly Nagar Ground; Attendance: Closed doors |

| 3 September 2021 Friendly | (India) Kerala Blasters | 2–0 | (India) Jammu & Kashmir XI | Kochi, Kerala |
| 16:00 IST | Seityasen 43'; Stalin 83' | Report | | Stadium: Panampilly Nagar Ground; Attendance: Closed doors |

| 5 October 2021 Friendly | (India) Kerala Blasters | 2–0 | (India) Indian Navy | Kochi, Kerala |
| 16:00 IST | Gyeltshen 10'; Vázquez 88' | Report | | Stadium: Panampilly Nagar Ground; Attendance: Closed doors |

| 12 October 2021 Friendly | (India) Kerala Blasters | 3–0 | (India) MA Football Academy | Kochi, Kerala |
| 16:00 IST | Pereyra Díaz 15'; Lešković 70'; Vázquez 74' | Report | | Stadium: Panampilly Nagar Ground; Attendance: Closed doors |

| 15 October 2021 Friendly | (India) Goa | Cancelled | (India) Kerala Blasters | Parra, Goa |
| 16:00 IST | | Match Cancelled | | Stadium: Parra Ground |
Note: Match was called-off due to bad weather

| 1 November 2021 Friendly | (India) Kerala Blasters | 2–1 | (India) Odisha | Parra, Goa |
| 16:00 IST | Prasanth K; Vázquez | Report | Hernández | Stadium: Parra Ground; Attendance: Closed doors |
Note: Time of goals are not given due to the match not being recorded as per the ISL regulations.

| 5 November 2021 Friendly | (India) Kerala Blasters | 2–1 | (India) Chennaiyin | Parra, Goa |
| 16:00 IST | Puitea 34'; Luna 67' | Report | Koman 30' | Stadium: Parra Ground; Attendance: Closed doors |
Note: The match was totally played for 120 minutes, with 4 quarters of 30 minutes.

| 9 November 2021 Friendly | (India) Kerala Blasters | 0–3 | (India) Jamshedpur | Parra, Goa |
| 16:00 IST | | Report | Thangjam 18', 30'; Valskis 33' | Stadium: Parra Ground; Attendance: Closed doors |

| 12 November 2021 Friendly | (India) Kerala Blasters | 1–1 | (India) Jamshedpur | Parra, Goa |
| 16:00 IST | Díaz 18'; Barretto (yellow card) (yellow-red card); Lešković (yellow card) (yellow-red card) | Report | Thatal 78'; Hartley (yellow card) (yellow-red card); Rahman (yellow card) (yellow-red card) | Stadium: Parra Ground; Attendance: Closed doors Referee: Crystal John |

== Competitions ==
=== Overview ===
Win Draw Loss

| Competition | First match | Last match | Starting round | Record | | | | | | | |
| Competition | First match | Last match | Starting round | Pld | W | D | L | GF | GA | GD | Win % |
|---|---|---|---|---|---|---|---|---|---|---|---|
| Super League | 19 November 2021 | 20 March 2022 | Matchday 1 | 23 | 10 | 9 | 4 | 37 | 26 | +11 | 43.48 |
| Durand Cup | 11 September 2021 | 21 September 2021 | Matchday 7 | 3 | 1 | 0 | 2 | 1 | 3 | −2 | 33.33 |
| Total | | | | 26 | 11 | 9 | 6 | 38 | 29 | +9 | 42.31 |

Last updated: 25 July 2022.
Source: Soccerway

=== Durand Cup ===
Group stage

| Pos | Team | Pld | W | D | L | GF | GA | GD | Pts | Qualification |
|---|---|---|---|---|---|---|---|---|---|---|
| 1 | Bengaluru | 3 | 2 | 1 | 0 | 9 | 5 | +4 | 7 | Knockout stage |
| 2 | Delhi | 3 | 1 | 1 | 1 | 4 | 4 | 0 | 4 | Knockout stage |
| 3 | Kerala Blasters | 3 | 1 | 0 | 2 | 1 | 3 | −2 | 3 | |
| 4 | Indian Navy | 3 | 1 | 0 | 2 | 5 | 7 | −2 | 3 | |

Source: Khel Now
Rules for classification: 1) points; 2) head-to-head points; 3) head-to-head goal difference; 4) goal difference; 5) number of goals scored; 6) drawing of lots

==== Matches ====
| 11 September 2021 Group stage | Kerala Blasters | 1–0 | Indian Navy | Kolkata, West Bengal |
| 15.00 IST | Luna 71' (pen.); Khabra (yellow card) 84' | Report | Sarbjith (yellow card) 54'; Dalraj (yellow card) 69' | Stadium: Salt Lake Stadium; Attendance: Closed doors Man of the Match: Adrian Luna (Kerala Blasters) |

| 15 September 2021 Group stage | Bengaluru | 2–0 | Kerala Blasters | Kolkata, West Bengal |
| 15.00 IST | Shrivas (yellow card) 37'; Bhutia 45'; Augustine 71' | Report | Singh (yellow card) 42' (yellow-red card) 83'; Hormipam (yellow card) 48' (yellow-red card) 62'; Meitei (yellow card) 83' (yellow-red card) 85' | Stadium: Salt Lake Stadium; Attendance: Closed doors Man of the Match: Lara Sharma (Bengaluru) |

| 21 September 2021 Group stage | Delhi | 1–0 | Kerala Blasters | Kalyani, West Bengal |
| 15.00 IST | Plaza 53' | Report | Sipović (yellow card) 38' | Stadium: Kalyani Stadium; Referee: Closed doors Man of the Match: Anwar Ali (Delhi) |

=== Indian Super League ===
==== League table ====
| Pos | Team | Pld | W | D | L | GF | GA | GD | Pts | Qualification |
|---|---|---|---|---|---|---|---|---|---|---|
| 2 | Hyderabad (Note: Hyderabad qualified for Playoffs for 2023–24 AFC Cup qualifying playoffs by winning the ISL playoffs) (C) | 20 | 11 | 5 | 4 | 43 | 23 | +20 | 38 | Qualification to ISL playoffs and Playoffs for 2023–24 AFC Cup qualifying playoffs |
| 3 | ATK Mohun Bagan | 20 | 10 | 7 | 3 | 37 | 26 | +11 | 37 | Qualification to ISL playoffs |
| 4 | Kerala Blasters | 20 | 9 | 7 | 4 | 34 | 24 | +10 | 34 | Qualification to ISL playoffs |
| 5 | Mumbai City | 20 | 9 | 4 | 7 | 36 | 31 | +5 | 31 | |
| 6 | Bengaluru | 20 | 8 | 5 | 7 | 32 | 27 | +5 | 29 | |

Source: Indian Super League
Rules for classification: 1) points; 2) head-to-head points; 3) head-to-head goal difference; 4) head-to-head goals scored; 5) goal difference; 6) number of goals scored; 7) fair play ranking; 8) drawing of lots
(C) Champions

==== League Results by Round ====
| Match | 1 | 2 | 3 | 4 | 5 | 6 | 7 | 8 | 9 | 10 | 11 | 12 | 13 | 14 | 15 | 16 | 17 | 18 | 19 | 20 |
|---|---|---|---|---|---|---|---|---|---|---|---|---|---|---|---|---|---|---|---|---|
| Ground | A | A | A | H | A | A | A | H | H | H | A | H | H | A | H | H | A | H | H | A |
| Result | L | D | D | W | D | W | W | D | D | W | W | L | W | L | W | D | L | W | W | D |
| League Position | 11 | 8 | 8 | 6 | 7 | 5 | 3 | 3 | 3 | 1 | 1 | 3 | 2 | 5 | 3 | 4 | 5 | 4 | 4 | 4 |

Updated to match(es) played on 6 March 2022. Source: Indian Super League
A = Away; H = Home; W = Win; D = Draw; L = Loss

==== Matches ====
Note: The initial fixtures were announced in September 2021, and the rest of the matches in December. But the fixtures were revised in January 2022 after a series of COVID-19 cases led to the postponement of several matches.

| 19 November 2021 1 | ATK Mohun Bagan | 4–2 | Kerala Blasters | Margao, Goa |
| 19:30 IST | Boumous 2', 27'; Krishna 27' (pen.); McHugh (yellow card) 38'; Colaco 50'; Tangri (yellow card) 82' | Report | Sahal 24'; Gomes (yellow card) 26'; Khabra (yellow card) 55'; Díaz 69' | Stadium: Fatorda Stadium; Attendance: Closed doors Referee: Harish Kundu; Man of the Match: Hugo Boumous (ATK Mohun Bagan) |

| 25 November 2021 2 | NorthEast United | 0–0 | Kerala Blasters | Margao, Goa |
| 19:30 IST | Gurjinder (yellow card) 22'; Lakra (yellow card) 87' | Report | Sipović (yellow card) 26' | Stadium: Fatorda Stadium; Attendance: Closed doors Referee: Aditya Purkayastha; Man of the Match: Hernán Santana (NorthEast United) |

| 28 November 2021 3 | Bengaluru | 1–1 | Kerala Blasters | Bambolim, Goa |
| 19:30 IST | Chaudhari (yellow card) 22'; Kuruniyan 84' | Report | Khabra (yellow card) 90'; Kuruniyan 88' (o.g.) | Stadium: GMC Athletic Stadium; Attendance: Closed doors Referee: Pranjal Banerjee; Man of the Match: Harmanjot Khabra (Kerala Blasters) |

| 5 December 2021 4 | Kerala Blasters | 2–1 | Odisha | Vasco da Gama, Goa |
| 19:30 IST | Lešković (yellow card) 49'; Vázquez 62'; Jeakson (yellow card) 99'; Prasanth 85' | Report | Moirangthem (yellow card) 16'; Lalruatthara (yellow card) 88'; Raj 90+5' | Stadium: Tilak Maidan Stadium; Attendance: Closed doors Referee: R Venkatesh; Man of the Match: Adrián Luna (Kerala Blasters) |

| 12 December 2021 5 | East Bengal | 1–1 | Kerala Blasters | Vasco da Gama, Goa |
| 19:30 IST | Haokip (yellow card) 11'; Kiyam (yellow card) 22'; Mrcela 37'; Hnamte (yellow card) 65' | Report | Vázquez 44' | Stadium: Tilak Maidan Stadium; Attendance: Closed doors Referee: R Venkatesh; Man of the Match: Adrián Luna (Kerala Blasters) |

| 19 December 2021 6 | Mumbai City | 0–3 | Kerala Blasters | Margao, Goa |
| 19:30 IST | Fall (yellow card) 36' (yellow-red card) 50' | Report | Vázquez (yellow card) 5'; Sahal 27'; Vázquez 47'; Díaz 51' (pen.) | Stadium: Fatorda Stadium; Attendance: Closed doors Referee: Pranjal Banerjee; Man of the Match: Álvaro Vázquez (Kerala Blasters) |

| 22 December 2021 7 | Chennaiyin | 0–3 | Kerala Blasters | Vasco da Gama, Goa |
| 19:30 IST | | Report | Díaz 9'; Sahal 38'; Puitea (yellow card) 56'; Luna 79' | Stadium: Tilak Maidan Stadium; Attendance: Closed doors Referee: Crystal John; Man of the Match: Adrián Luna (Kerala Blasters) |

| 26 December 2021 8 | Kerala Blasters | 1–1 | Jamshedpur | Vasco da Gama, Goa |
| 19:30 IST | Díaz (yellow card) 19'; Sahal 27'; Vázquez (yellow card) 90+3' | Report | Stewart 14' (yellow card) 48' | Stadium: Tilak Maidan Stadium; Attendance: Closed doors Referee: Pratik Mondal; Man of the Match: Greg Stewart (Jamshedpur) |

| 2 January 2022 9 | Kerala Blasters | 2–2 | Goa | Vasco da Gama, Goa |
| 19:30 IST | Jeakson 10'; Luna 20'; Lešković (yellow card) 43'; Puitea (yellow card) 67' | Report | Ortiz 24' (yellow card) 58'; Bedia 38'; Martins (yellow card) 43'; Fernandes (yellow card) 76' | Stadium: Tilak Maidan Stadium; Attendance: Closed doors Referee: C. R. Srikrishna; Man of the Match: Jorge Ortiz (Goa) |

| 9 January 2022 10 | Kerala Blasters | 1–0 | Hyderabad | Vasco da Gama, Goa |
| 19:30 IST | Khabra (yellow card) 7'; Vázquez 42'; Sandeep (yellow card) 64'; Carneiro (yellow card) 83'; Gill (yellow card) 90+2' | Report | Ogbeche (yellow card) 10'; Tavora (yellow card) 66'; Siverio (yellow card) 74'; Danu (yellow card) 83'; Juanan (yellow card) 85' | Stadium: Tilak Maidan Stadium; Attendance: Closed doors Referee: Pranjal Banerjee; Man of the Match: Álvaro Vázquez (Kerala Blasters) |

| 12 January 2022 11 | Odisha | 0–2 | Kerala Blasters | Vasco da Gama, Goa |
| 19:30 IST | Antonay (yellow card) 29'; Lalruatthara (yellow card) 42' | Report | Sipović (yellow card) 15'; Nishu 28'; Khabra 40'; Puitea (yellow card) 81'; Díaz (yellow card) 90+4' | Stadium: Tilak Maidan Stadium; Attendance: Closed doors Referee: Senthil Nathan; Man of the Match: Harmanjot Khabra (Kerala Blasters) |

| ~~16 January 2022~~ ~~12~~ | Kerala Blasters | Postponed | Mumbai City | Vasco da Gama, Goa |
| 19:30 IST | | | | Stadium: Tilak Maidan Stadium; Attendance: Closed doors |
Note: This match was postponed due to the COVID-19 cases in the camp prior to the game.

| ~~20 January 2022~~ ~~13~~ | Kerala Blasters | Postponed | ATK Mohun Bagan | Vasco da Gama, Goa |
| 19:30 IST | | | | Stadium: Tilak Maidan Stadium; Attendance: Closed doors |
Note: This match was postponed due to the COVID-19 cases in the camp, one day prior to the match.

| 30 January 2022 12 | Kerala Blasters | 0–1 | Bengaluru | Vasco da Gama, Goa |
| 19:30 IST | Puitea (yellow card) 41'; Vázquez (yellow card) 62' | Report | Ibara (yellow card) 11'; Roshan 56' | Stadium: Tilak Maidan Stadium; Attendance: Closed doors Referee: Harish Kundu; Man of the Match: Naorem Roshan Singh (Bengaluru) |

| 4 February 2022 13 | Kerala Blasters | 2–1 | NorthEast United | Vasco da Gama, Goa |
| 19:30 IST | Adhikari (yellow card) 47' (yellow-red card) 70'; Díaz 62' (yellow card) 67'; Vázquez 82' | Report | Gogoi (yellow card) 15'; Roy (yellow card) 55'; Lakra (yellow card) 74'; Sahanek (yellow card) 80'; Irshad 90+6' | Stadium: Tilak Maidan Stadium; Attendance: Closed doors Referee: Pratik Mondal; Man of the Match: Álvaro Vázquez (Kerala Blasters) |

| 10 February 2022 14 | Jamshedpur | 3–0 | Kerala Blasters | Bambolim, Goa |
| 19:30 IST | Chima (yellow card) 20' (goal) 53'; Stewart 45' (pen.), 48' (pen.); Hartley (yellow card) 83' | Report | Lešković (yellow card) 46'; Luna (yellow card) 53'; Sandeep (yellow card) 81'; Khabra (yellow card) 82' | Stadium: GMC Athletic Stadium; Attendance: Closed doors Referee: Ashwin; Man of the Match: Greg Stewart (Jamshedpur) |

| 14 February 2022 15 | Kerala Blasters | 1–0 | East Bengal | Vasco da Gama, Goa |
| 19:30 IST | Sipović 49'; Sandeep Singh (yellow card) 60'; Díaz (yellow card) 90+6' | Report | Naocha (yellow card) 80'; Mondal (yellow card) 89' | Stadium: Tilak Maidan Stadium; Attendance: Closed doors Referee: Aditya Purkayastha; Man of the Match: Puitea (Kerala Blasters) |

| 19 February 2022 16 | Kerala Blasters | 2–2 | ATK Mohun Bagan | Vasco da Gama, Goa |
| 19:30 IST | Luna 7', 64' (yellow card) 51'; Lešković (yellow card) 35'; Puitea (yellow card) 56'; Díaz (yellow card) 84'; Sandeep (yellow card) 86'; Vázquez (yellow card) 90+4' | Report | David Williams 8'; Kauko (yellow card) 56', (goal) 90+7' | Stadium: Tilak Maidan Stadium; Attendance: Closed doors Referee: Rahul Kumar Gupta; Man of the Match: Adrián Luna (Kerala Blasters) |

| 23 February 2022 17 | Hyderabad | 2–1 | Kerala Blasters | Bambolim, Goa |
| 19:30 IST | Juanan (yellow card) 25'; Ogbeche 28'; Chakrabarti (yellow card) 45+1'; Siverio 87' | Report | Rahul (yellow card) 83'; Barretto 90+5'; Khabra (yellow card) 90+6' | Stadium: GMC Athletic Stadium; Attendance: Closed doors Referee: Harish Kundu; Man of the Match: Juanan (Hyderabad) |

| 26 February 2022 18 | Kerala Blasters | 3–0 | Chennaiyin | Vasco da Gama, Goa |
| 19:30 IST | Barretto (yellow card) 24'; Díaz 52', 55'; Puitea (yellow card) 71'; Luna 90' | Report | Koman (yellow card) 58'; Ali (yellow card) 75' | Stadium: Tilak Maidan Stadium; Attendance: Closed doors Referee: Pratik Mondal; Man of the Match: Sanjeev Stalin (Kerala Blasters) |

| 2 March 2022 19 | Kerala Blasters | 3–1 | Mumbai City | Vasco da Gama, Goa |
| 19:30 IST | Sahal 19'; Vázquez 45+2' (pen.), 60'; Gill (yellow card) 72' | Report | Bheke (yellow card) 25'; Chhangte (yellow card) 49'; Maurício 71' (pen.); Gabriel (yellow card) 79' | Stadium: Tilak Maidan Stadium; Attendance: Closed doors Referee: Rahul Kumar Gupta; Man of the Match: Puitea (Kerala Blasters) |

| 6 March 2022 20 | Goa | 4–4 | Kerala Blasters | Bambolim, Goa |
| 19:30 IST | Tiwari (yellow card) 25'; Cabrera 49', 63' (pen.), 82'; Dohling 79'; Bedia (yellow card) 90+2' | Report | Díaz 10', 25' (pen.); Adhikari (yellow card) 41'; Barretto 88'; Vázquez 90' | Stadium: GMC Athletic Stadium; Attendance: Closed doors Referee: Aditya Purkayastha; Man of the Match: Airam Cabrera (Goa) |

=== Indian Super League Playoffs ===
==== Matches ====
| 11 March 2022 Semi-finals 1st leg | Jamshedpur | 0–1 | Kerala Blasters | Margao, Goa |
| 19:30 IST | Lima (yellow card) 87' | Report | Sahal 38', (yellow card) 81'; Vázquez (yellow card) 63' | Stadium: Fatorda Stadium; Attendance: Closed doors Referee: Tejas Nagvenkar; Man of the Match: Ruivah Hormipam (Kerala Blasters) |

| 15 March 2022 Semi-finals 2nd leg | Kerala Blasters | 1–1 (2–1 agg.) | Jamshedpur | Vasco da Gama, Goa |
| 19:30 IST | Luna 18'; Adhikari (yellow card) 32'; Jeakson (yellow card) 57'; Puitea (yellow card) 82'; Gill (yellow card) 87' | Report | Halder 50'; Lallawmawma (yellow card) 90+4' | Stadium: Tilak Maidan Stadium; Attendance: Closed doors Referee: Harish Kundu; Man of the Match: Adrián Luna (Kerala Blasters) |

Kerala Blasters defeated Jamshedpur on the aggregate score of 2–1.

| 20 March 2022 Final | Hyderabad | 1–1 (a.e.t.) (3–1 p) | Kerala Blasters | Margao, Goa |
| 19:30 IST | Tavora 88' | Report | Sandeep (yellow card) 4'; Rahul 68'; Díaz (yellow card) 81'; Ayush (yellow card) 114' | Stadium: Fatorda Stadium; Attendance: 11,500; Referee: Crystal John; Man of the Match: Laxmikant Kattimani (Hyderabad) |
| | Penalties |
| | Victor (penalty scored); Siverio (penalty missed); Camara (penalty scored); Narzary (penalty scored) | | Lešković (penalty missed); Nishu (penalty missed); Ayush (penalty scored); Jeakson (penalty missed) |

== Statistics ==
All stats are correct as of 20 March 2022

=== Squad appearances and goals ===
| No. | Pos | Nat | Player | Total | | Super League | | Durand Cup | |
| No. | Pos | Nat | Player | Apps | Goals | Apps | Goals | Apps | Goals |
Goalkeepers
| 1 | GK | (India) IND | Karanjit Singh | 0 | 0 | 0 | 0 | 0 | 0 |
| 13 | GK | (India) IND | Prabhsukhan Singh Gill | 21 | 0 | 19+1 | 0 | 1 | 0 |
| 31 | GK | (India) IND | Sachin Suresh | 0 | 0 | 0 | 0 | 0 | 0 |
| 32 | GK | (India) IND | Albino Gomes | 6 | 0 | 4 | 0 | 2 | 0 |
| 78 | GK | (India) IND | Muheet Shabir | 0 | 0 | 0 | 0 | 0 | 0 |
Defenders
| 2 | DF | (Bosnia and Herzegovina) BIH | Enes Sipovic | 17 | 1 | 8+6 | 1 | 3 | 0 |
| 3 | DF | (India) IND | Sandeep Singh | 16 | 0 | 7+7 | 0 | 2 | 0 |
| 4 | DF | (India) IND | Ruivah Hormipam | 16 | 0 | 13+1 | 0 | 1+1 | 0 |
| 5 | DF | (India) IND | Nishu Kumar | 11 | 1 | 4+7 | 1 | 0 | 0 |
| 14 | DF | (India) IND | Jessel Carneiro | 13 | 0 | 10 | 0 | 2+1 | 0 |
| 15 | DF | (India) IND | Sanjeev Stalin | 9 | 0 | 6+2 | 0 | 1 | 0 |
| 19 | DF | (India) IND | Denechandra Meitei | 4 | 0 | 1+2 | 0 | 1 | 0 |
| 26 | DF | (India) IND | Abdul Hakku | 2 | 0 | 0+1 | 0 | 1 | 0 |
| 34 | DF | (India) IND | Bijoy Varghese | 6 | 0 | 5 | 0 | 0+1 | 0 |
| 55 | DF | (Croatia) CRO | Marko Lešković | 21 | 0 | 21 | 0 | 0 | 0 |
Midfielders
| 7 | MF | (India) IND | Puitea | 23 | 0 | 19+1 | 0 | 2+1 | 0 |
| 8 | MF | (India) IND | Ayush Adhikari | 20 | 0 | 8+9 | 0 | 1+2 | 0 |
| 10 | MF | (India) IND | Harmanjot Khabra | 21 | 1 | 19 | 1 | 2 | 0 |
| 11 | MF | (India) IND | Givson Singh | 5 | 0 | 1+3 | 0 | 1 | 0 |
| 17 | MF | (India) IND | Rahul K. P. | 10 | 1 | 3+4 | 1 | 3 | 0 |
| 18 | MF | (India) IND | Sahal Abdul Samad | 22 | 6 | 20+1 | 6 | 0+1 | 0 |
| 20 | MF | (Uruguay) URU | Adrián Luna | 25 | 7 | 22+1 | 6 | 2 | 1 |
| 22 | MF | (India) IND | Seityasen Singh | 6 | 0 | 0+3 | 0 | 2+1 | 0 |
| 24 | MF | (India) IND | K Prasanth | 18 | 1 | 1+14 | 1 | 2+1 | 0 |
| 25 | MF | (India) IND | Jeakson Singh | 22 | 1 | 17+2 | 1 | 3 | 0 |
| 47 | MF | (India) IND | Vincy Barretto | 19 | 2 | 5+12 | 2 | 0+2 | 0 |
Forwards
| 30 | FW | (Argentina) ARG | Jorge Pereyra Díaz | 21 | 8 | 18+3 | 8 | 0 | 0 |
| 33 | FW | (India) IND | Sreekuttan VS | 2 | 0 | 0 | 0 | 1+1 | 0 |
| 77 | FW | (Bhutan) BHU | Chencho Gyeltshen | 19 | 0 | 2+16 | 0 | 0+1 | 0 |
| 99 | FW | (Spain) ESP | Álvaro Vázquez | 23 | 8 | 21+2 | 8 | 0 | 0 |

Source: World Football

=== Squad statistics ===
| Factors | League | Durand Cup | Super Cup | Total |
|---|---|---|---|---|
| Games Played | 23 | 3 | 0 | 26 |
| Games Won | 10 | 1 | 0 | 11 |
| Games Drawn | 8 | 0 | 0 | 8 |
| Games Lost | 5 | 2 | 0 | 7 |
| Goals Scored | 37 | 1 | 0 | 38 |
| Goals Conceded | 26 | 3 | 0 | 29 |
| Goal Difference | +11 | -2 | 0 | +9 |
| Clean Sheets | 8 | 1 | 0 | 9 |
| Goals by Substitutes | 4 | 0 | 0 | 4 |
| Yellow Cards | 50 | 2 | 0 | 52 |
| Red Cards | 2 | 3 | 0 | 5 |

Players Used: 27

=== Goalscorers ===
| Rank | Name | No. | Pos. | League | Durand Cup | Super Cup | Total |
|---|---|---|---|---|---|---|---|
| 1 | (Argentina) Jorge Pereyra | 30 | ST | 8 | 0 | 0 | 8 |
| 1 | (Spain) Álvaro Vázquez | 99 | ST | 8 | 0 | 0 | 8 |
| 2 | (Uruguay) Adrián Luna | 20 | AM | 6 | 1 | 0 | 7 |
| 3 | (India) Sahal Abdul | 18 | AM | 6 | 0 | 0 | 6 |
| 4 | (India) Vincy Barretto | 47 | RW | 2 | 0 | 0 | 2 |
| 5 | (India) Prasanth K | 24 | RM | 1 | 0 | 0 | 1 |
| 5 | (India) Jeakson Singh | 25 | CDM | 1 | 0 | 0 | 1 |
| 5 | (India) Nishu Kumar | 5 | LB | 1 | 0 | 0 | 1 |
| 5 | (India) Harmanjot Khabra | 10 | RB | 1 | 0 | 0 | 1 |
| 5 | (Bosnia and Herzegovina) Enes Sipović | 2 | CB | 1 | 0 | 0 | 1 |
| 5 | (India) Rahul K. P. | 17 | RW | 1 | 0 | 0 | 1 |
| Total | | | | 36 | 1 | 0 | 37 |

Source: Indian Super League

=== Assist ===
| Rank | No. | Pos. | Nation | Name | League | Durand Cup | Super Cup | Total |
|---|---|---|---|---|---|---|---|---|
| 1 | 20 | AM | (Uruguay) | Adrián Luna | 7 | 0 | 0 | 7 |
| 2 | 7 | CM | (India) | Puitea | 3 | 0 | 0 | 3 |
| 3 | 17 | RW | (India) | Rahul K. P. | 2 | 0 | 0 | 2 |
| 3 | 99 | ST | (Spain) | Álvaro Vázquez | 2 | 0 | 0 | 2 |
| 3 | 25 | CDM | (India) | Jeakson Singh | 2 | 0 | 0 | 2 |
| 4 | 14 | LB | (India) | Jessel Carneiro | 1 | 0 | 0 | 1 |
| 4 | 30 | ST | (Argentina) | Jorge Pereyra | 1 | 0 | 0 | 1 |
| 4 | 10 | RB | (India) | Harmanjot Khabra | 1 | 0 | 0 | 1 |
| 4 | 18 | AM | (India) | Sahal Abdul | 1 | 0 | 0 | 1 |
| 4 | 77 | LW | (Bhutan) | Chencho Gyeltshen | 1 | 0 | 0 | 1 |
| 4 | 24 | RM | (India) | Prasanth K | 1 | 0 | 0 | 1 |
| Total | | | | | 22 | 0 | 0 | 22 |

Source: Indian Super League

=== Clean-sheets ===
| Rank | Name | No. | League | Durand Cup | Super Cup | Total |
|---|---|---|---|---|---|---|
| 1 | (India) Prabhsukhan Gill | 13 | 7 | 0 | 0 | 7 |
| 2 | (India) Albino Gomes | 32 | 2 (Note: Substituted in one game while holding a clean-sheet) | 1 | 0 | 3 |
| Total | | | 8 | 1 | 0 | 9 |

Source: Indian Super League

=== Disciplinary record ===
| No. | Pos. | Nation | Name | League | | | Durand Cup | | | Super Cup | | | Total | | |
| No. | Pos. | Nation | Name | Yellow card | Second yellow card | Red card | Yellow card | Second yellow card | Red card | Yellow card | Second yellow card | Red card | Yellow card | Second yellow card | Red card |
|---|---|---|---|---|---|---|---|---|---|---|---|---|---|---|---|
| 10 | MF | (India) | Harmanjot Khabra | 5 | 0 | 0 | 1 | 0 | 0 | 0 | 0 | 0 | 6 | 0 | 0 |
| 4 | DF | (India) | Ruivah Hormipam | 0 | 0 | 0 | 0 | 1 | 0 | 0 | 0 | 0 | 0 | 1 | 0 |
| 3 | DF | (India) | Sandeep Singh | 5 | 0 | 0 | 0 | 1 | 0 | 0 | 0 | 0 | 5 | 1 | 0 |
| 19 | DF | (India) | Denechandra Meitei | 0 | 0 | 0 | 0 | 1 | 0 | 0 | 0 | 0 | 0 | 1 | 0 |
| 2 | DF | (Bosnia and Herzegovina) | Enes Sipović | 2 | 0 | 0 | 1 | 0 | 0 | 0 | 0 | 0 | 3 | 0 | 0 |
| 32 | GK | (India) | Albino Gomes | 1 | 0 | 0 | 0 | 0 | 0 | 0 | 0 | 0 | 1 | 0 | 0 |
| 55 | DF | (Croatia) | Marko Lešković | 5 | 0 | 0 | 0 | 0 | 0 | 0 | 0 | 0 | 5 | 0 | 0 |
| 25 | MF | (India) | Jeakson Singh | 2 | 0 | 0 | 0 | 0 | 0 | 0 | 0 | 0 | 2 | 0 | 0 |
| 99 | FW | (Spain) | Álvaro Vázquez | 5 | 0 | 0 | 0 | 0 | 0 | 0 | 0 | 0 | 5 | 0 | 0 |
| 7 | MF | (India) | Puitea | 7 | 0 | 0 | 0 | 0 | 0 | 0 | 0 | 0 | 7 | 0 | 0 |
| 30 | MF | (Argentina) | Pereyra Díaz | 6 | 0 | 1 | 0 | 0 | 0 | 0 | 0 | 0 | 6 | 0 | 1 |
| 14 | DF | (India) | Jessel Carneiro | 1 | 0 | 0 | 0 | 0 | 0 | 0 | 0 | 0 | 1 | 0 | 0 |
| 13 | GK | (India) | Prabhsukhan Gill | 3 | 0 | 0 | 0 | 0 | 0 | 0 | 0 | 0 | 3 | 0 | 0 |
| 8 | MF | (India) | Ayush Adhikari | 3 | 1 | 0 | 0 | 0 | 0 | 0 | 0 | 0 | 3 | 1 | 0 |
| 20 | MF | (Uruguay) | Adrián Luna | 2 | 0 | 0 | 0 | 0 | 0 | 0 | 0 | 0 | 2 | 0 | 0 |
| 17 | MF | (India) | Rahul K. P. | 1 | 0 | 0 | 0 | 0 | 0 | 0 | 0 | 0 | 1 | 0 | 0 |
| 47 | MF | (India) | Vincy Barretto | 1 | 0 | 0 | 0 | 0 | 0 | 0 | 0 | 0 | 1 | 0 | 0 |
| 18 | MF | (India) | Sahal Samad | 1 | 0 | 0 | 0 | 0 | 0 | 0 | 0 | 0 | 1 | 0 | 0 |
| Total | | | | 50 | 1 | 1 | 2 | 3 | 0 | 0 | 0 | 0 | 52 | 4 | 1 |

Source: World Football

=== Injury record ===
| N | P | Nat. | Name | Type | Status | Source | Match | Inj. Date | Ret. Date |
| 18 | MF | (India) | Sahal Abdul | unknown | | KBFC.in | in national team camp | Pre-season | 7 October 2021 |
| 17 | DF | (India) | Abdul Hakku | hamstring injury | | KBFC.in | vs Indian Navy | 11 September 2021 | 12 December 2021 |
| 17 | RW | (India) | Rahul K. P. | torn groin muscle | | KBFC.in | vs ATK Mohun Bagan | 19 November 2021 | 14 February 2022 |
| 32 | GK | (India) | Albino Gomes | knee injury | | KBFC.in | vs Odisha | 5 December 2021 | 2022–23 season |
| 10 | MF | (India) | Harmanjot Khabra | muscle pull | | KBFC.in | in training | 12 December 2021 | 19 December 2021 |
| 2 | DF | (Bosnia and Herzegovina) | Enes Sipović | quadricep injury | | KBFC.in | vs East Bengal | 12 December 2021 | 26 December 2021 |
| 14 | DF | (India) | Jessel Carneiro | acromioclavicular joint injury | | KBFC.in | vs Hyderabad | 9 January 2022 | 2022–23 season |
| 4 | DF | (India) | Ruivah Hormipam | nasal bone fracture | | KBFC.in | vs Jamshedpur | 10 February 2022 | 26 February 2022 |

- Player is injured
- Player has recovered from injury
Last updated: 12 May 2022
Source: Kerala Blasters FC

== Seasonal awards ==
=== Indian Super League ===
- 2021–22 Indian Super League Golden Glove: Prabhsukhan Gill.

=== Kerala Blasters ===
- Kerala Blasters Fans' Player of the Season: Adrián Luna.

== Club awards ==
=== Indian Super League ===
==== ISL Hero of the Month award ====
This is awarded after the voting done by the fans and the experts in the Indian Super League.

| Month | Nat. | Player | % Votes |
|---|---|---|---|
| March | (India) | Ruivah Hormipam | 80.86% |

==== ISL Emerging Player of the Month award ====
This is awarded after the voting done by the experts in the Indian Super League.

| Month | Nat. | Player | Refs. |
|---|---|---|---|
| February | (India) | Prabhsukhan Gill | |
| March | (India) | Ruivah Hormipam | |

==== ISL Fans' Goal of the Week award ====
This is awarded weekly to the players chosen by fans voting at the Indian Super League website.

| Week | Nat. | Player | Score | Opponents | Date | % Votes |
|---|---|---|---|---|---|---|
| Week 1 | (India) | Sahal Samad | 1–1 | ATK Mohun Bagan | 19 November 2021 | 83.2% |
| Week 4 | (India) | Prasanth K | 2–0 | Odisha | 5 December 2021 | 53.2% |
| Week 7 | (Spain) | Álvaro Vázquez | 0–2 | Mumbai City | 19 December 2021 | 71.5% |
| Week 8 | (Uruguay) | Adrián Luna | 0–3 | Chennaiyin | 22 December 2021 | 61.9% |
| Week 10 | (Uruguay) | Adrián Luna | 2–0 | Goa | 2 January 2022 | 91.1% |
| Week 11 | (Spain) | Álvaro Vázquez | 1–0 | Hyderabad | 9 January 2022 | 91.3% |
| Week 12 | (India) | Nishu Kumar | 0–1 | Odisha | 12 January 2022 | 93.8% |
| Week 16 | (Spain) | Álvaro Vázquez | 2–0 | NorthEast United | 4 February 2022 | 88.7% |
| Week 19 | (Uruguay) | Adrián Luna | 2–1 | ATK Mohun Bagan | 19 February 2021 | 93.8% |
| Week 20 | (India) | Vincy Barretto | 2–1 | Hyderabad | 23 February 2022 | 63.7% |
| Week 21 | (India) | Sahal Samad | 1–0 | Mumbai City | 2 March 2022 | 92.5% |
| Week 22 | (Spain) | Álvaro Vázquez | 4–4 | Goa | 6 March 2022 | 66.0% |

==== ISL MVP of the Week award ====
This is awarded weekly to the players chosen by the Indian Super League.

| Week | Nat. | Player | Refs. |
|---|---|---|---|
| Week 9 | (India) | Harmanjot Khabra | |
| Week 14 | (Uruguay) | Adrián Luna | |
| Week 15 | (Argentina) | Jorge Pereyra Díaz | |
| Week 17 | (Uruguay) | Adrián Luna | |

=== Kerala Blasters ===
==== Kerala Blasters Fans' Player of the Month award ====
Note: This is awarded monthly to the players of Kerala Blasters as chosen by the fans via voting in their social media platforms.

| Month | Nat. | Player | Refs. |
|---|---|---|---|
| December | (Croatia) | Marko Lešković | |
| January | (Uruguay) | Adrián Luna | |
| February | (Uruguay) | Adrián Luna | |

==== Kerala Blasters Fans' Goal of the Month award ====
Note: This is awarded monthly to the players of Kerala Blasters as chosen by the fans via voting in their social media platforms.

| Month | Nat. | Player | Score | Opponents | Date | Refs. |
|---|---|---|---|---|---|---|
| December | (Spain) | Álvaro Vázquez | 0–2 | Mumbai City | 19 December 2021 | |
| January | (Uruguay) | Adrián Luna | 2–0 | Goa | 2 January 2022 | |
| February | (Spain) | Álvaro Vázquez | 2–0 | NorthEast United | 4 February 2022 | |

== See also ==
- Kerala Blasters FC
- List of Kerala Blasters FC seasons
- Indian Super League
- 2021–22 Indian Super League season
