= 2022 Indian Super League final =

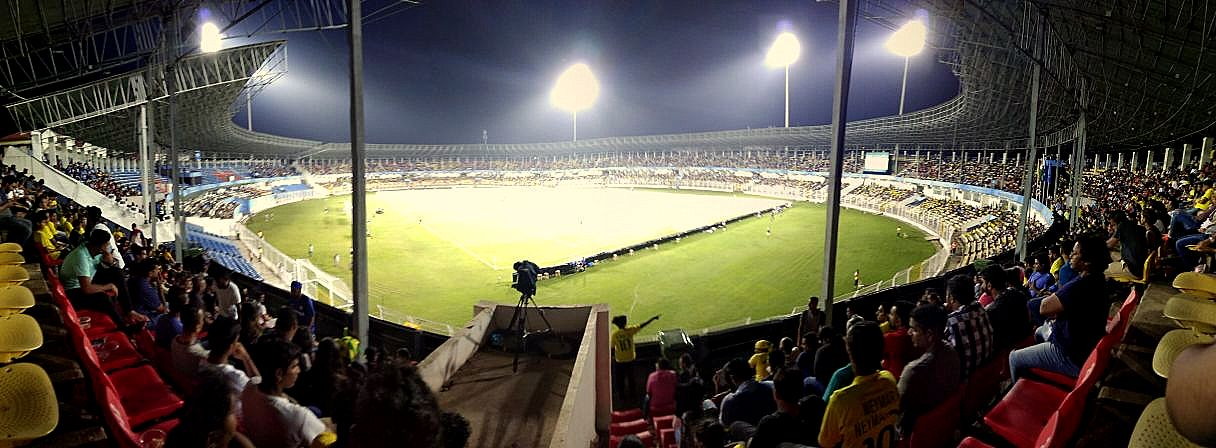
- Fatorda Stadium in Margao, Goa hosted the match.
- Event: 2021–22 Indian Super League
| Hyderabad | Kerala Blasters |
| 1 | 1 |
- Hyderabad won 3–1 on penalties
- Date: 20 March 2022
- Venue: Fatorda Stadium, Margao, Goa
- Hero of the Match: Laxmikant Kattimani
- Referee: Crystal John
- Attendance: 11,500

The 2022 Indian Super League final was the eighth Indian Super League final match, played to determine the champions of the 2021–22 Indian Super League season. It was played on 20 March 2022 between Hyderabad and Kerala Blasters at the Fatorda Stadium in Margao, Goa. The match had spectators attending for the first time after two years.

The match ended 1–1 after extra time, with Hyderabad winning 3–1 on penalties to secure their first Indian Super League title.

== Background ==
Hyderabad finished second in the regular season table and won 3–2 aggregate against ATK Mohun Bagan in the playoff semi-final to qualify for the final for the first time in club history.

Kerala Blasters finished fourth in the regular season table and won 2–1 aggregate against league premiers Jamshedpur in the playoff semi-final to qualify for their third appearance in the final.

== Match ==
20 March 2022
19:30 IST

| Hyderabad | 1–1 (a.e.t.) | Kerala Blasters |
|---|---|---|
| Tavora 88' | Report | Rahul KP 68' |
Penalties
| João MJT (penalty scored); Siverio (penalty missed); K. Camara (penalty scored); Hali (penalty scored) | 3–1 | Lešković (penalty missed); Nishu (penalty missed); Ayush (penalty scored); Jeakson (penalty missed) |

Fatorda Stadium, Margao, Goa
Attendance: 11,500
Referee: Crystal John

| Hyderabad | Kerala Blasters |

| GK | 25 | (India) Laxmikant Kattimani |
| DF | 44 | (India) Asish Rai |
| DF | 4 | (India) Chinglensana Singh |
| DF | 5 | (Spain) Juanan | (substituted off) 86' |
| DF | 31 | (India) Akash Mishra |
| MF | 8 | (Brazil) João Victor |
| MF | 23 | (India) Souvik Chakrabarti | (substituted off) 71' |
| MF | 10 | (India) Yasir Mohammad | (substituted off) 86' |
| MF | 9 | (India) Aniket Jadhav | (substituted off) 71' |
| FW | 7 | (Australia) Joel Chianese | (substituted off) 39' |
| FW | 20 | (Nigeria) Bartholomew Ogbeche |
Substitutes:
| GK | 1 | (India) Gurmeet Singh |
| DF | 29 | (India) Nim Dorjee |
| MF | 6 | (Mauritania) Khassa Camara | (substituted on) 86' |
| MF | 14 | (India) Sahil Tavora | (substituted on) 71' |
| MF | 18 | (India) Hitesh Sharma |
| MF | 19 | (India) Halicharan Narzary | (substituted on) 71' |
| MF | 88 | (India) Mark Zothanpuia |
| Fw | 12 | (India) Aaren D'Silva | (substituted on) 86' |
| MF | 99 | (Spain) Javier Siverio | (substituted on) 39' |
Head coach:
(Spain) Manolo Márquez

| GK | 13 | (India) Prabhsukhan Gill |
| DF | 4 | (India) Ruivah Hormipam |
| DF | 55 | (Croatia) Marko Lešković |
| DF | 3 | (India) Sandeep Singh | (yellow card) 5' |
| MF | 10 | (India) Harmanjot Khabra |
| MF | 25 | (India) Jeakson Singh |
| MF | 20 | (Uruguay) Adrián Luna |
| MF | 7 | (India) Lalthathanga Khawlhring | | (substituted off) 98' |
| FW | 17 | (India) Rahul KP | | (substituted off) 82' |
| FW | 99 | (Spain) Álvaro Vázquez | | (substituted off) 115' |
| FW | 30 | (Argentina) Jorge Pereyra Díaz | (yellow card) 81' | (substituted off) 92' |
Substitutes:
| GK | 1 | (India) Karanjit Singh |
| DF | 2 | (Bosnia and Herzegovina) Enes Sipović |
| DF | 5 | (India) Nishu Kumar | | (substituted on) 82' |
| MF | 34 | (India) Bijoy V |
| DF | 15 | (India) Sanjeev Stalin |
| MF | 8 | (India) Ayush Adhikari | (yellow card) 113' | (substituted on) 98' |
| MF | 24 | (India) Prasanth Karuthadathkuni |
| MF | 47 | (India) Vincy Barretto | | (substituted on) 115' |
| FW | 77 | (Bhutan) Chencho Gyeltshen | | (substituted on) 92' |
Head coach:
(Serbia) Ivan Vukomanovic

Hero of the Match

- Laxmikant Kattimani (Hyderabad)

Match rules

- 90 minutes.
- 30 minutes of extra time if necessary.
- Penalty shoot-out if scores still level.
- Nine named substitutes.
- Maximum of five substitutions.
