= Sachin Suresh =

Indian football player

Personal information
- Full name: Sachin Ammanath Suresh
- Date of birth: 18 January 2001 (age 25)
- Place of birth: Thrissur, Kerala, India
- Height: 1.83 m (6 ft 0 in)
- Position: Goalkeeper

Team information
- Current team: Odisha

Youth career
- 2008–2017: SEPT
- 2017–2020: FC Kerala

Senior career*
Years	Team	Apps	(Gls)
2020	FC Kerala	7	(0)
2020–2023	Kerala Blasters B	8	(0)
2021–2026	Kerala Blasters	32	(0)
2026–	Odisha	0	(0)
- * Club domestic league appearances and goals as of 16:30, 14 February 2026 (UTC)

Sachin Ammanath Suresh (born 18 January 2001) is an Indian professional footballer who plays as a goalkeeper for Indian Super League club Odisha.

== Club career ==
=== Youth and early career ===
Sachin's early football lessons were at the Farook Higher Secondary School, Kozhikode. He began his football career at the age of seven with Sports and Education Promotion Trust (SEPT), a local academy in Kerala, where he began to train under his father. He represented them in Dubai Super Cup at the age of eleven in 2012.

Sachin was also a regular starter for the Thrissur district team and played for them in the U-10, U-12, U-14, U-16 age groups. He also represented Kerala team in the U-14, U-16, U-18 age groups. In 2017, Sachin was scouted by the coaching staff of FC Kerala, who selected him to play for their U-18 team. Sachin eventually earned promotion to the club's senior team in 2019 and played for them in the 2019–20 I-League 2nd Division. He also represented the Kerala football team in the 2018–19 Santosh Trophy.

=== Kerala Blasters FC ===
==== 2020–2023: Rise to the first team ====
In August 2020, Sachin was signed by the Indian Super League club Kerala Blasters. He was put in their reserve side, and played for them in the 2020–21 Kerala Premier League. Sachin was then promoted to the club's senior team ahead of the 2021–22 season along with Bijoy Varghese. He was included in the Blasters' squad for the 2021 Durand Cup as their third choice keeper, and was benched during the game against Delhi on 21 September 2021.

Sachin was then included in the Blasters squad to train with them on a developmental role for the 2021–22 Indian Super League season. When Albino Gomes was injured mid-way of the season, Sachin became the second choice goalkeeper for the Blasters. He was then included in the matchday squad for the first time in the league game on 12 December 2021 against SC East Bengal. He remained mostly as an unused substitute throughout the season without making any appearance.

During the same season, he also played for the reserves in the 2021–22 Kerala Premier League. Sachin then played for the reserves in the 2022 RFDL, held from 2022 April to May, where the team emerged as the runners-up and qualified for the Next Gen Cup. He played for the side in the Next Gen Cup held in United Kingdom in July 2022 and received positive reception for his performance throughout the tournament.

In August 2022, with the first team preparing for the 2022–23 Indian Super League season in UAE, Kerala Blasters fielded their reserves for the 2022 Durand Cup, where Sachin was appointed as the captain of the team. He played five matches in the tournament, where he conceded six goals and kept two clean sheets.

For the 2022–23 Indian Super League season, Sachin was the third choice keeper of the first team. He only made it to the matchday squad on two occasions during the season. He mostly played for the reserve team in the 2022–23 Kerala Premier League and the 2023 RFDL during the season. He was the regular captain for the team in both the tournaments.

In April 2023, Sachin was included in the Kerala Blasters squad for the 2023 Super Cup. He finally made his official first team debut for the Blasters on 8 April 2023 in the group stage match against Punjab (then RoundGlass Punjab FC) which the Blasters won 3–1. He also started for the Blasters in their remaining two more matches in the tournament before their exit from the group stage.

==== 2023–2024: Contract extension, league debut and injury ====
On 17 July 2023, Kerala Blasters announced that Sachin has signed a three-year contract extension with the club, that would keep him with them until 2026. He made his first appearance of the season against Gokulam Kerala FC on 13 August in the 2023 Durand Cup, which they lost 3–4 at full-time. Sachin kept his first official clean-sheet for the senior team on 21 August against the Indian Air Force in a 0–5 victory.

He made his Indian Super League debut for the club on 21 September in the season opener against Bengaluru FC at home, which the Blasters won 2–1. Sachin kept his first clean-sheet in the league on 1 October against Jamshedpur. He also made some crucial saves in the second half and helped in a 1–0 victory.

Sachin was pivotal in the Blasters' 2–1 victory over Odisha FC on 27 October, in which he saved a penalty kick and a rebound ball followed by the penalty, and helped the Blasters to win the match 2–1 with an all-Indian defence unit for the match. Sachin's heroics continued in the next game against East Bengal on 5 November, as he saved another penalty-kick taken by Cleiton Silva during the 84th minute, denying East Bengal their equalizer and helped the Blasters' in a 2–1 win.

He also became the first goalkeeper in the history of ISL to save penalties in consecutive matches. Sachin kept his second clean-sheet against Hyderabad FC on 25 November. He then made his third clean sheet on 14 December against Punjab FC and went on to keep two consecutive clean sheets against Mumbai City FC and Mohun Bagan SG. This also made him the first goalkeeper in the club's history to keep three consecutive clean-sheets in the league.

On 16 February 2024, Sachin sustained a shoulder injury in the away game against Chennaiyin FC. The club soon announced that he would miss the remaining season. In April, Sachin undergone a successful surgery on his shoulder.

==== 2024–2026 ====
After being sidelined for six months, Sachin came back to action on 23 August against Bengaluru FC in the 2024 Durand cup quarter finals by coming as a substitute for the injured Som Kumar in the 5th minute.

=== Odisha FC ===
On 9 September 2026, Sachin was signed by Indian Super League side Odisha on a two-year deal.

== International career ==
Sachin has represented India at the U-17 and U-20 levels. He was part of the India U-20 team that defeated Argentina U-20 team in the COTIF Cup held in Valencia on 7 August 2020. He was then included in the 50-men probables of the U-23 squad amidst the rumours of India's participation in the 2023 Asian Games.

== Personal life ==
Sachin was born on 18 January 2001 in the Indian state of Kerala. His father, Suresh A. M. who also had a footballing background was a former goalkeeper and his mother was a school headmistress. He was also a playmate of his current Kerala Blasters teammate, Rahul K. P. during his time at a local football nursery. Sachin moved to the middle-east along with his family before returning to Kerala to complete his schooling at Farook Higher Secondary School in Farook College, Kozhikode, and completed his graduation at Sri Vyasa NSS College in Wadakkancherry. At schooling level, Sachin secured an A-plus in all subjects for both SSLC and higher secondary public examinations.

== Career statistics ==
=== Club ===
As of matches played till 4 November 2023

Club	Season	League			Super Cup		Continental		Durand Cup		Total	
Club	Season	Division	Apps	Goals	Apps	Goals	Apps	Goals	Apps	Goals	Apps	Goals
FC Kerala	2019–20	I-League 2nd Division	7	0	—		—		—		7	0
Kerala Blasters B	2020–21	Kerala Premier League	5	0	—		—		—		5	0
Kerala Blasters B	2022	RFD League	6	0	—		—		—		6	0
Kerala Blasters B	2023	RFD League	2	0	—		—		—		2	0
Kerala Blasters B	Total		13	0	—		—		—		13	0
Kerala Blasters	2021–22	Indian Super League	0	0	—		—		0	0	0	0
Kerala Blasters	2022–23	Indian Super League	0	0	3	0	—		5	0	8	0
Kerala Blasters	2023–24	Indian Super League	6	0	—		—		2	0	8	0
Kerala Blasters	Total		6	0	3	0	—		7	0	16	0
Career total			26	0	3	0	0	0	7	0	36	0

== Honours ==
Kerala Blasters

- Indian Super League runner-up: 2021–22
