= 2022 Indian Super League playoffs =

Tournament details
- Country: India
- Teams: 4

Final positions
- Champions: Hyderabad
- Runners-up: Kerala Blasters
- Semifinalists: Jamshedpur; ATK Mohun Bagan

Tournament statistics
- Matches played: 5
- Goals scored: 10 (2 per match)

The 2022 Indian Super League playoffs was the eighth playoffs series of the Indian Super League, one of the top Indian professional football leagues. The playoffs began on 11 March 2022 and concluded with the final on 20 March in Goa.

The top four teams from the 2021–22 ISL regular season had qualified for the playoffs. The semi-finals took place over two legs while the final was a one-off match at the Fatorda Stadium in Margao, Goa.

== Season table ==
Pos	Team	Pld	W	D	L	GF	GA	GD	Pts	Qualification
1	Jamshedpur (L)	20	13	4	3	42	21	+21	43	Qualification to ISL playoffs and Playoffs for 2023–24 AFC Champions League group stage
2	Hyderabad (Note: Hyderabad qualified for Playoffs for 2023–24 AFC Cup qualifying playoffs by winning the ISL playoffs) (C)	20	11	5	4	43	23	+20	38	Qualification to ISL playoffs and Playoffs for 2023–24 AFC Cup qualifying playoffs
3	ATK Mohun Bagan	20	10	7	3	37	26	+11	37	Qualification to ISL playoffs
4	Kerala Blasters	20	9	7	4	34	24	+10	34	Qualification to ISL playoffs
5	Mumbai City	20	9	4	7	36	31	+5	31	
6	Bengaluru	20	8	5	7	32	27	+5	29	
7	Odisha	20	6	5	9	31	43	−12	23	
8	Chennaiyin	20	5	5	10	17	35	−18	20	
9	Goa	20	4	7	9	29	35	−6	19	
10	NorthEast United	20	3	5	12	25	43	−18	14	
11	East Bengal	20	1	8	11	18	36	−18	11	

Source: Indian Super League
Rules for classification: 1) points; 2) head-to-head points; 3) head-to-head goal difference; 4) head-to-head goals scored; 5) goal difference; 6) number of goals scored; 7) fair play ranking; 8) drawing of lots
(C) Champions; (L) League Winners' Shield Winners

== Teams ==
- Jamshedpur
- ATK Mohun Bagan
- Hyderabad
- Kerala Blasters

== Bracket ==
Semi-finals
1	Jamshedpur	0	1	1
4	Kerala Blasters	1	1	2
2	Hyderabad	3	0	3
3	ATK Mohun Bagan	1	1	2

Final
4	Kerala Blasters	1 (1)
2	Hyderabad (p)	1 (3)

=== Semi-finals ===
Team 1	Agg.	Team 2	1st leg	2nd leg
Jamshedpur	1–2	Kerala Blasters	0–1	1–1
Hyderabad	3–2	ATK Mohun Bagan	3–1	0–1

== Semi-finals ==
11 March 2022
19:30 IST

Jamshedpur	0–1	Kerala Blasters
	Report	Sahal 38'

Fatorda Stadium, Margao, Goa
Attendance: 0
Referee: Tejas Nagvenkar
15 March 2022
19:30 IST

Kerala Blasters	1–1	Jamshedpur
A. Luna 18'	Report	Pronay 50'

Tilak Maidan Stadium, Vasco da Gama, Goa
Attendance: 0
Referee: Harish Kundu

Kerala Blasters won 2–1 on aggregate.

12 March 2022
19:30 IST

Hyderabad	3–1	ATK Mohun Bagan
Ogbeche 45+2'; Yasir 58'; Siverio 64'	Report	Krishna 18'

GMC Athletic Stadium, Bambolim
Attendance: 0
Referee: Rahul Kumar Gupta
16 March 2022
19:30 IST

ATK Mohun Bagan	1–0	Hyderabad
Krishna 79'	Report

GMC Athletic Stadium, Bambolim
Attendance: 0
Referee: R Venkatesh

Hyderabad won 3–2 on aggregate.

== Final ==
20 March 2022
19:30 IST

Hyderabad	1–1 (a.e.t.)	Kerala Blasters
Tavora 88'	Report	Rahul KP 68'
Penalties
João MJT (penalty scored); Siverio (penalty missed); K. Camara (penalty scored); Hali (penalty scored)	3–1	Lešković (penalty missed); Nishu (penalty missed); Ayush (penalty scored); Jeakson (penalty missed)

Fatorda Stadium, Margao, Goa
Attendance: 11,500
Referee: Crystal John
