= 2019 Santosh Trophy final =

- Event: 2018–19 Santosh Trophy
Services	Punjab
(India)	(India)
1	0
- Date: 21 April 2019
- Venue: Guru Nanak Stadium, Ludhiana, Punjab
- Referee: Harish Kundu
- Attendance: 3,262
- Weather: Hot; 33 °C (91 °F)

The 2019 Santosh Trophy final was a match between Services and Punjab on 21 April 2019 in Ludhiana, Punjab. The match was a culmination of the 2018–19 Santosh Trophy, the 73rd edition of the football competition contested by regional state associations and government institutions under the All India Football Federation.

Services won their sixth title by defeating Punjab 1–0.

== Match ==
21 April 2019
15:30 IST

Services	1–0	Punjab
Bikash Thapa 61'	Report

Guru Nanak Stadium, Ludhiana
Attendance: 3,262
Referee: Harish Kundu

Man of the Match:
Bikash Thapa

Assistant referees:
Kishan chand Joshi
Vijayasankar
Fourth official:
Ashwin

Match rules

- 90 minutes.
- 30 minutes of extra time if necessary.
- Penalty shoot-out if scores still level.
