= Sanjeev Stalin =

Indian footballer (born 2001)

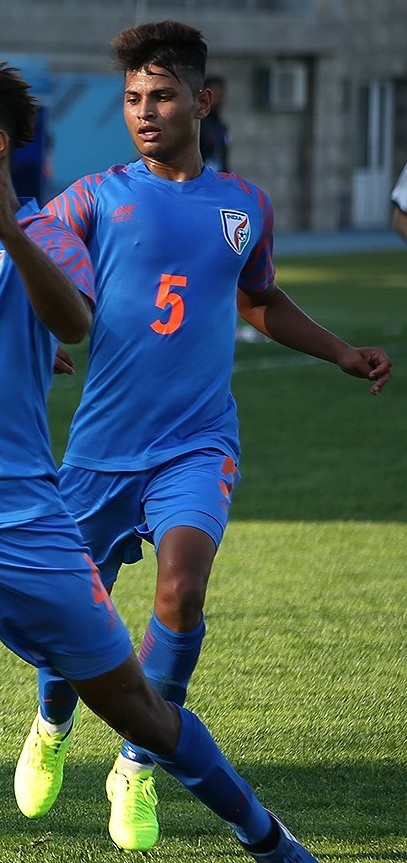

Personal information
- Full name: Sanjeev Stalin
- Date of birth: 17 January 2001 (age 25)
- Place of birth: Bengaluru, Karnataka, India
- Height: 1.66 m (5 ft 5 1/2 in)
- Position: Left back

Youth career
- AIFF Elite Academy

Senior career*
Years	Team	Apps	(Gls)
2017–2020	Indian Arrows	28	(0)
2020	Aves B	45	(0)
2020–2021	Sertanense	35	(0)
2021–2022	Kerala Blasters	8	(0)
2022	Kerala Blasters B	7	(0)
2022–2026	Mumbai City	18	(0)

International career^{‡}
2015–2016	India U16	20	(2)
2016–2017	India U17	12	(1)
2017–2019	India U19	6	(0)
2017–2021	India U20	6	(0)
2023	India U23	2	(0)
- * Club domestic league appearances and goals as of 14:30, 15 March 2026 (UTC) ‡ National team caps and goals as of 14:28, 4 July 2022 (UTC)

Sanjeev Stalin (born 17 January 2001) is an Indian professional footballer who plays as a defender. He has represented India at various youth international levels including in the 2017 FIFA U-17 World Cup. He began his senior career with the Indian Arrows before playing for Portuguese clubs Aves B and Sertanense.

== Club career ==
=== Youth and early career ===
==== Indian Arrows ====
Stalin was part of the AIFF Elite Academy batch that was preparing for the 2017 FIFA U-17 World Cup to be hosted in India. After the tournament, Stalin was selected to play for the Indian Arrows, an All India Football Federation-owned team that would consist of India under-20 players to give them playing time. He made his professional debut for the side in the Arrow's first match of the season against Chennai City. He started and helped the team keep the clean sheet as Indian Arrows won 3–0.

==== C.D. Aves ====
On 11 February 2020, Stalin signed a two-year deal at Portuguese Primeira Liga club C.D. Aves, where played for the club's U-19 and U-23 squads.

==== Sertanense ====
On 24 August 2020, Stalin joined Portuguese third division club Sertanense for the 2020–21 season.

=== Kerala Blasters ===
On 18 March 2021, Indian Super League club Kerala Blasters FC announced the signing of Stalin on a 3-year deal. He made his debut for the club in the 2021 Durand Cup match against arch-rivals Bengaluru FC on 15 September, which they lost 2–0. Stalin made his Indian Super League debut in the match against Hyderabad FC on 9 January 2022 as substitute for injured Jessel Carneiro, which the Blasters won 1–0. On 26 February, in the match against their southern rivals Chennaiyin FC, he was awarded with the man of the match award for his performance, as the Blasters won 3–0 at full-time.

==== Mumbai City FC ====
On 14 July 2022, Mumbai City FC announced the signing of Stalin on a four-year contract for an undisclosed transfer fee. He made his debut away against Hyderabad FC, coming on as a 76th-minute substitute for Mandar Rao Dessai in a 3–3 draw.

== International career ==
Stalin represented the India under-17 side which participated in the 2017 FIFA U-17 World Cup which was hosted in India. On 9 October 2017, he assisted Jeakson Singh to score India's first ever goal in a FIFA tournament against Colombia. He was also a part of the India under-20 team and made appearances for the side.

== Personal life ==
Sanjeev Stalin was born to his father, Stalin, and mother Parameshwari, in Bangalore, Karnataka. His parents run a small garment shop and his mother is a Burmese Indian who emigrated back to India to help her nephew. At the age of 10 Stalin was spotted by Indo-Iranian coach Jamshid Nassiri who recommended that he should join a football academy.

== Career statistics ==
As of 30 July 2023

Club	Season	League			National cup		League cup		Continental		Other		Total	
Club	Season	Division	Apps	Goals	Apps	Goals	Apps	Goals	Apps	Goals	Apps	Goals	Apps	Goals
Indian Arrows	2017–18	I-League	17	0	1 (Note: Appearance(s) in Super Cup (India))	0	—		—		—		18	0
Indian Arrows	2018–19	I-League	11	0	2	0	—		—		—		13	0
Aves	2019–20	Primeira Liga	0	0	—		—		—		—		0	0
Sertanense	2020–21	Campeonato de Portugal	0	0	—		—		—		—		0	0
Kerala Blasters	2021–22	Indian Super League	8	0	—		1 (Note: Appearance(s) in Durand Cup)	0	—		7 (Note: Appearance(s) in Reliance Foundation Development League)	0	16	0
Mumbai City	2022–23	Indian Super League	11	0	—		7	0	—		0	0	18	0
Career total			47	0	3	0	8	0	0	0	7	0	65	0

== Honours ==
Mumbai City

- ISL League Winners Shield: 2022–23

== See also ==
- List of Indian football players in foreign leagues
