= Denechandra Meitei Yendrembam =

Indian footballer (born 1994)

Denechandra Meitei
Personal information
- Full name: Denechandra Meitei Yendrembam
- Date of birth: 28 March 1994 (age 32)
- Place of birth: Manipur, India
- Height: 1.73 m (5 ft 8 in)
- Position: Left-back

Youth career
- 2008–2009: Mohun Bagan
- 2009: Sambhalpur Academy
- 2011–2013: Pune

Senior career*
Years	Team	Apps	(Gls)
2013–2014	Pune	1	(0)
2016–2017	Ozone	1	(0)
2017	Sagolband United		
2017–2018	Churchill Brothers	15	(0)
2018–2019	NEROCA	4	(0)
2019–2020	TRAU	12	(0)
2020–2023	Kerala Blasters	9	(0)
2022–2023	→ Odisha (loan)	14	(0)
2023–2025	Punjab	0	(0)

International career
- India U23
- * Club domestic league appearances and goals as of 21:34, 4 March 2023 (UTC)

Denechandra Meitei Yendrembam (Meitei: Yendrembam Denechandra Meitei, born 28 March 1994) is an Indian professional footballer who plays as a defender.

== Club career ==
=== Early career ===
Born in Manipur, Meitei started playing football from the age of 10 years. He initially trained at a local stadium to improve his technical ability. He eventually managed to make it into his district team and then the Manipur football team in the youth nationals. Then in 2008 he was signed by Mohun Bagan A.C. to join their academy. After a one-year stay at the academy, Meitei joined the Sambhalpur Academy in Orissa. However, due to problems with both academies in terms of how they taught academics, Meitei dropped out of both. He then went back to Manipur to play for a local club.

Then, after going back to Manipur, James Singh of Mumbai F.C. recommended Meitei to trial at Pune F.C. for a spot in the Pune F.C. Academy. Meitei trialed for the spot in the academy and passed. While with the Pune F.C. Academy Meitei had won the I-League U19 twice.

=== Pune Football Club ===
On 10 October 2013, Meitei made his professional debut for Pune F.C. in the I-League against Mohun Bagan A.C. at the Balewadi Sports Complex in which he came on in the 89th minute for Pierre Douhou as Pune won the match 2–0.

=== Kerala Blasters ===
On 5 August 2020, it was announced that Meitei would join Kerala Blasters from TRAU FC. He made his first appearance for the club on 29 November 2021, against Chennaiyin FC. On 6 May 2021, Metei signed a new three-year contract with Kerala Blasters, keeping him at the club until 2024.

Meitei was included in the Kerala Blasters squad for the 2021 Durand Cup, and played his first match against arch-rivals Bengaluru FC on 15 September, where he received a red card and the match ended in a 2–0 defeat for the Blasters. He played his first match of the 2021–22 Indian Super League season as a substitute for Nishu Kumar against Bengaluru itself in the 88th minute of the, which they lost 0–1.

=== Odisha FC (loan) ===
On 6 July 2022, Odisha FC announced the signing of Meitei on a season long loan deal from the Blasters.

== International career ==
Meitei has represented India at the under-23 level in which he played for them in a tournament held at Bangladesh.

== Career statistics ==
=== Club ===
As of 23 August 2024

Club	Season	League			Cup		AFC		Total	
Club	Season	Division	Apps	Goals	Apps	Goals	Apps	Goals	Apps	Goals
Pune	2013–14	I-League	1	0	0	0	—		1	0
Ozone	2016–17	I-League 2nd Division	1	0	0	0	—		1	0
Churchill Brothers	2017–18	I-League	15	0	2 (Note: Appearance(s) in Super Cup)	0	—		17	0
NEROCA	2018–19	I-League	4	0	0	0	—		4	0
TRAU	2019–20	I-League	12	0	0	0	—		12	0
Kerala Blasters	2020–21	Indian Super League	6	0	0	0	—		6	0
Kerala Blasters	2021–22	Indian Super League	3	0	1 (Note: Appearance(s) in Durand Cup)	0	—		4	0
Kerala Blasters	Total		9	0	1	0	0	0	10	0
Odisha (loan)	2022–23	Indian Super League	14	0	4	0	1 (Note: Appearance(s) in play-offs for AFC Cup)	0	19	0
Punjab	2023–24	Indian Super League	0	0	0	0	—		0	0
Punjab	2024–25	Indian Super League	0	0	2	0	—		2	0
Punjab	Total		0	0	2	0	0	0	2	0
Career total			56	0	9	0	1	0	66	0

== Honours ==
=== Club ===
==== Kerala Blasters FC ====
- Indian Super League runner up: 2021–22.
