= Stephan Van Der Heyden =

Belgian footballer

Personal information
- Date of birth: 3 July 1969 (age 57)
- Place of birth: Sint-Gillis-Waas, Belgium
- Height: 1.84 m (6 ft 0 in)
- Position: Midfielder

Team information
- Current team: Norwich City (assistant head coach)

Senior career*
Years	Team	Apps	(Gls)
1987–1991	Beveren		
1991–1996	Club Brugge	130	(15)
1996–1997	Roda JC	27	(2)
1997–1998	Lille	16	(1)
1998–1999	Roda JC	25	(1)
1999–2001	Germinal Beerschot		

International career
1991–1994	Belgium	4	(0)

Managerial career
- 2010–2011: Sporting Lokeren (assistant manager)
- 2011–2013: Club Brugge (scout)
- 2013–2017: Club Brugge (assistant manager)
- 2017–2018: Vardar Skopje (assistant manager)
- 2018–2021: Jordan (assistant manager)
- 2021–2022: Kerala Blasters (assistant manager)
- 2023–2025: Rangers (assistant manager)
- 2025–: Norwich City (assistant manager)
- * Club domestic league appearances and goals

Stephan Van Der Heyden (born 3 July 1969) is a Belgian professional football coach and former player, who is the current assistant head coach of EFL Championship club Norwich City.

== Playing career ==
A midfielder during his playing career, Van Der Heyden has played for various clubs including Beveren, Club Brugge, Germinal Beerschot and Royal Cappellen in Belgium, Roda JC in the Netherlands, South Melbourne in Australia and Lille in France. He has also made a handful of appearances for the Belgian national teams in the junior and senior levels. He was in the Belgium squad for the 1994 FIFA World Cup.

== Coaching career ==
After retiring from professional football in 2003, he returned to the game as a coach in 2010. He started his coaching career at Sporting Lokeren before returning to former club Club Brugge. At Brugge, He began as part of their scouting team. In June 2013, he was appointed as the club’s assistant coach and continued with them for the next four years. In 2017, he signed with Macedonian club Vardar Skopje to take on the role of assistant coach once again. The following year, he started working with Jordan national team head coach Vital Borkelmans as his assistant.

On 14 October 2021, it was announced that Van Der Heyden has been appointed as the assistant coach of the Indian Super League club Kerala Blasters ahead of the 2021–22 season. Kerala Blasters reached the Play-Offs ànd the ISL Final. They only lost after extra time and penalties to Hyderabad fc. On 20 October 2023, Van Der Heyden joined Scottish Premiership side Rangers as assistant manager to Philippe Clement. Van Der Heyden left Rangers in February 2025 when Clement was sacked.

== Honours ==
=== Player ===
National Military Team

- Bronze medal with Belgium on WC in Naples Italy: 1987

KSK Beveren

- Belgian Second Division: 1990–1991

Club Brugge

- Belgian First Division: 1991–92, 1995–96
- Belgian Cup: 1994–95, 1995–96
- Belgian Super Cup: 1991, 1992, 1996

Roda JC

- KNVB Cup: 1996–97

=== Assistant Coach ===
Club Brugge

- Belgian Cup: 2014–15
- Belgian Pro League: 2015–16
- Belgian Super Cup: 2016

Rangers

- Scottish League Cup: 2023–24
