= Vincy Barretto =

Indian footballer

Personal information
- Date of birth: 8 December 1999 (age 26)
- Place of birth: Goa, India
- Height: 1.70 m (5 ft 7 in)
- Position: Winger

Team information
- Current team: Churchill Brothers
- Number: 47

Youth career
- Dempo

Senior career*
Years	Team	Apps	(Gls)
2017–2020	Goa B	9	(0)
2020–2021	Gokulam Kerala	13	(0)
2021–2022	Kerala Blasters	17	(2)
2022–2025	Chennaiyin	52	(5)
2025–2026	Jamshedpur	11	(1)
2026–	Churchill Brothers	4	(0)

International career^{‡}
2023	India U23	4	(0)
- * Club domestic league appearances and goals as of 5 November 2026 ‡ National team caps and goals as of 23:44, 28 September 2023 (UTC)

Vincy Barretto (born 8 December 1999) is an Indian professional footballer who plays as a forward for Indian Super League club Churchill Brothers.

== Club career ==
=== Early life and career ===
Born in Goa, India, Barretto did his youth career at the academy of Dempo SC where he featured for the club in the under-18 division.

=== FC Goa Reserves ===
Barretto signed his first senior contract with the reserve team of ISL side FC Goa in 2017. He was drafted for the first team for the 2018–19 Goa Professional League, which they emerged as champions. He also featured for them in seventeen different occasions in the domestic league and nine times in the I-League 2nd Division in the 2018–19 season. He left the team after the 2019–20 season, after he materialised a contract after a successful trial with I-League club Gokulam Kerala.

=== Gokulam Kerala FC ===
Barretto signed for I-League club Gokulam Kerala in 2020. He played his debut match for the club in the club's first match of season against Chennai City FC on 9 January 2021 as a starter in lineup, which ended 1–2 to Chennai City. He made thirteen appearances for the club and won the 2020–21 I-League title with the club.

=== Kerala Blasters ===
On 8 July 2021, Indian Super League club Kerala Blasters announced the signing of Barretto by paying an undisclosed transfer fee on a three-year deal. He made his debut for the club on 11 September 2021 against Indian Navy in the 2021 Durand Cup, which they won 1–0. Barretto made his ISL debut in the 2021–22 Indian Super League season match on 25 November 2021 against NorthEast United FC, which ended up in a goalless draw. On 23 February 2022, he scored his first career debut goal with the Blasters through a volley from outside the box in their 2–1 defeat to Hyderabad FC. He scored his second goal, again as a substitute against FC Goa on 7 March, which ended in a high-scoring 4–4 draw.

== Career statistics ==
=== Club ===
As of 3 March 2025

Club	Season	League			Cup		AFC		Total	
Club	Season	Division	Apps	Goals	Apps	Goals	Apps	Goals	Apps	Goals
Goa B	2017–18	I-League 2nd Division	5	0	0	0	—		5	0
Goa B	2018–19	I-League 2nd Division	2	0	0	0	—		2	0
Goa B	2019–20	I-League 2nd Division	2	0	0	0	—		2	0
Goa B	Total		9	0	0	0	0	0	9	0
Gokulam Kerala	2020–21	I-League	13	0	0	0	—		13	0
Kerala Blasters	2021–22	Indian Super League	17	2	2 (Note: Appearance(s) in Durand Cup)	0	—		19	2
Chennaiyin	2022–23	Indian Super League	16	3	0	0	—		16	3
Chennaiyin	2023–24	Indian Super League	20	1	5 (Note: Appearance(s) in Super Cup)	1	—		25	2
Chennaiyin	2024–25	Indian Super League	16	1	3	1	—		19	2
Chennaiyin	Total		52	5	8	2	0	0	60	7
Jamshedpur	2025–26	Indian Super League	0	0	0	0	—		0	0
Career total			91	7	10	2	0	0	101	9

== Honours ==
FC Goa Reserves

- Goa Professional League: 2018–19

Gokulam Kerala

- I-League: 2020–21

Kerala Blasters

- Indian Super League runner-up: 2021–22.
