= Jessel Carneiro =

Indian footballer (born 1990)

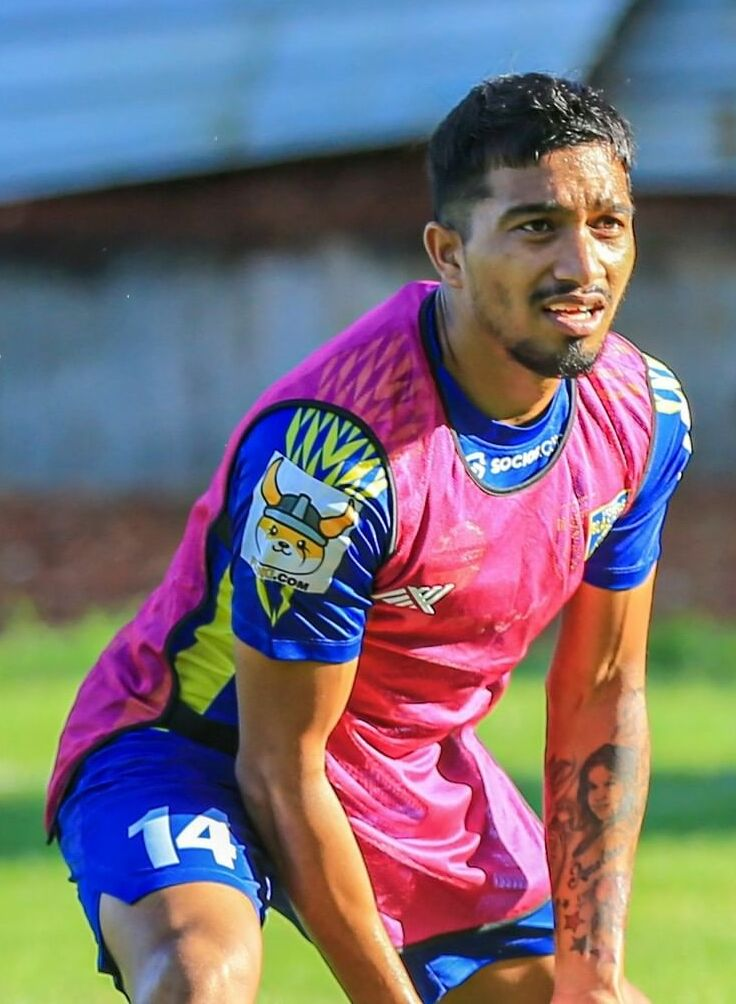
- Carneiro with Kerala Blasters in 2021

Personal information
- Full name: Jessel Allan Carneiro
- Date of birth: 14 July 1990 (age 36)
- Place of birth: Curtorim, Goa, India
- Height: 1.62 m (5 ft 4 in)
- Position: Left-back

Youth career
- Raya Football Club
- Curtorim Gymkhana

Senior career*
Years	Team	Apps	(Gls)
2012–2014	Dempo		
2014–2015	→ Pune (loan)		
2016–2018	FC Bardez	10	(5)
2018–2019	Dempo	13	(12)
2019–2023	Kerala Blasters	63	(0)
2023–2025	Bengaluru	8	(0)
- * Club domestic league appearances and goals as of 21:34, 14 March 2024 (UTC)

Jessel Allan Carneiro (born 14 July 1990) is an Indian professional footballer who plays as a left-back.

== Club career ==
=== Youth career ===
Jessel was born in Curtorim, a town in South Goa, India. He began his youth career with Raya Football Club and later played for his local team, Curtorim Gymkhana.

=== Early career ===
In 2012, Jessel signed with Dempo S.C., where he spent two seasons before joining Pune F.C. on loan for the 2014–15 season. In 2016, he joined FC Bardez, a club competing in the Goa Professional League. He returned to Dempo S.C. in 2018.

During the 2018–19 Santosh Trophy, Jessel captained the Goa football team, leading them to the semi-finals. He was also one of the standout performers for Dempo S.C. during the 2018–19 Goa Professional League, helping the team finish in second place.

=== Kerala Blasters ===
==== 2019–2020 : ISL debut ====
Jessel joined Kerala Blasters following an impressive spell with Dempo SC in the Goa Professional League and a strong showing for the Goa football team in the Santosh Trophy. Reportedly, the Blasters paid a transfer fee of approximately ₹18 lakh to Dempo SC to secure his services.

He made his debut for the Blasters on 20 October 2019 against ATK in the season opener, where the team won 2–1. While the Blasters had a modest 2019–20 season in the Indian Super League, Jessel emerged as one of the standout performers.

He was a consistent presence in defence, contributing five assists and recording 78 clearances, 28 tackles, 22 blocks, and 22 interceptions. Jessel also completed 746 passes—the highest among all Blasters players—with an average of 41.44 passes per match and an accuracy of 72.65%. He was the only player in the squad to play every minute of the season.

==== 2020–2023 ====
On 1 July 2020, Kerala Blasters officially announced that Jessel had extended his contract with the club until 2023. On 18 November 2020, he was named one of the vice-captains of the team. Jessel captained Kerala Blasters for the first time on 27 December 2020 in a 2–0 victory over Hyderabad FC. He led the team in most of the remaining matches of the season after first-choice captain Sergio Cidoncha was ruled out due to an ankle injury.

Jessel was included in the squad for the 2021 Durand Cup and played all three matches for the club. On 13 November 2021, he was appointed as the permanent club captain ahead of the 2021–22 season. He featured in the season opener against ATK Mohun Bagan FC, which ended in a 4–2 defeat.

On 9 January 2022, during a 1–0 win over Hyderabad FC, Jessel sustained an injury in stoppage time and had to be stretchered off the pitch. The following day, the club confirmed that he had suffered a shoulder injury and would be sidelined for an extended period. On 19 January, he underwent successful surgery on his left AC joint.

Jessel returned to action in the season opener of the 2022–23 ISL season on 7 October 2022, helping Kerala Blasters to a 3–1 victory over East Bengal. However, following the fifth league match against Mumbai City FC on 28 October—which the Blasters lost 2–0—he was largely used as a substitute. He returned to the starting lineup on 26 December in a home fixture against Odisha FC, which the Blasters won 1–0.

=== Bengaluru ===
On 25 July 2023, Bengaluru FC announced the signing of Jessel Carneiro on a two-year deal. He made his debut for the club on 21 September 2023 in the season opener against his former side Kerala Blasters, which Bengaluru lost 2–1.

== Career statistics ==
As of matches played till 10 April 2023

Club	Season	League			Cup		Durand Cup		Total	
Club	Season	Division	Apps	Goals	Apps	Goals	Apps	Goals	Apps	Goals
Kerala Blasters FC	2019–20	Indian Super League	18	0	0	0	–	–	18	0
Kerala Blasters FC	2020–21	Indian Super League	16	0	0	0	–	–	16	0
Kerala Blasters FC	2021–22	Indian Super League	10	0	0	0	3	0	13	0
Kerala Blasters FC	2022–23	Indian Super League	19	0	0	0	–	–	19	0
Kerala Blasters FC	Kerala Blasters total		63	0	0	0	3	0	66	0
Career total			63	0	0	0	3	0	66	0

== Honours ==
=== Club ===
==== Kerala Blasters FC ====
- Indian Super League runner up: 2021–22.

== External sources ==
- Jessel Carneiro at Soccerway

Sporting positions
Preceded by Bartholomew Ogbeche	Kerala Blasters FC; Captain; 2020–2023	Succeeded by Adrián Luna
