= Parra, Goa =

Village in Goa, India

Parra
- Village
- Location in Goa, India Parra (India)
- Coordinates: 15°34′0″N 73°47′0″E
- Country: India
- State: Goa
- District: North Goa

Languages
  - Official: Konkani
- Time zone: UTC+5:30 (IST)
- PIN: 403510
- Vehicle registration: GA
- Nearest city: Mapusa

Parra is a village on the outskirts of Mapusa town Bardez sub-district, North Goa, India. It has traditionally been known as a village that has grown luscious watermelons. In recent times, the village is facing considerable urbanisation and social change.

== Location ==
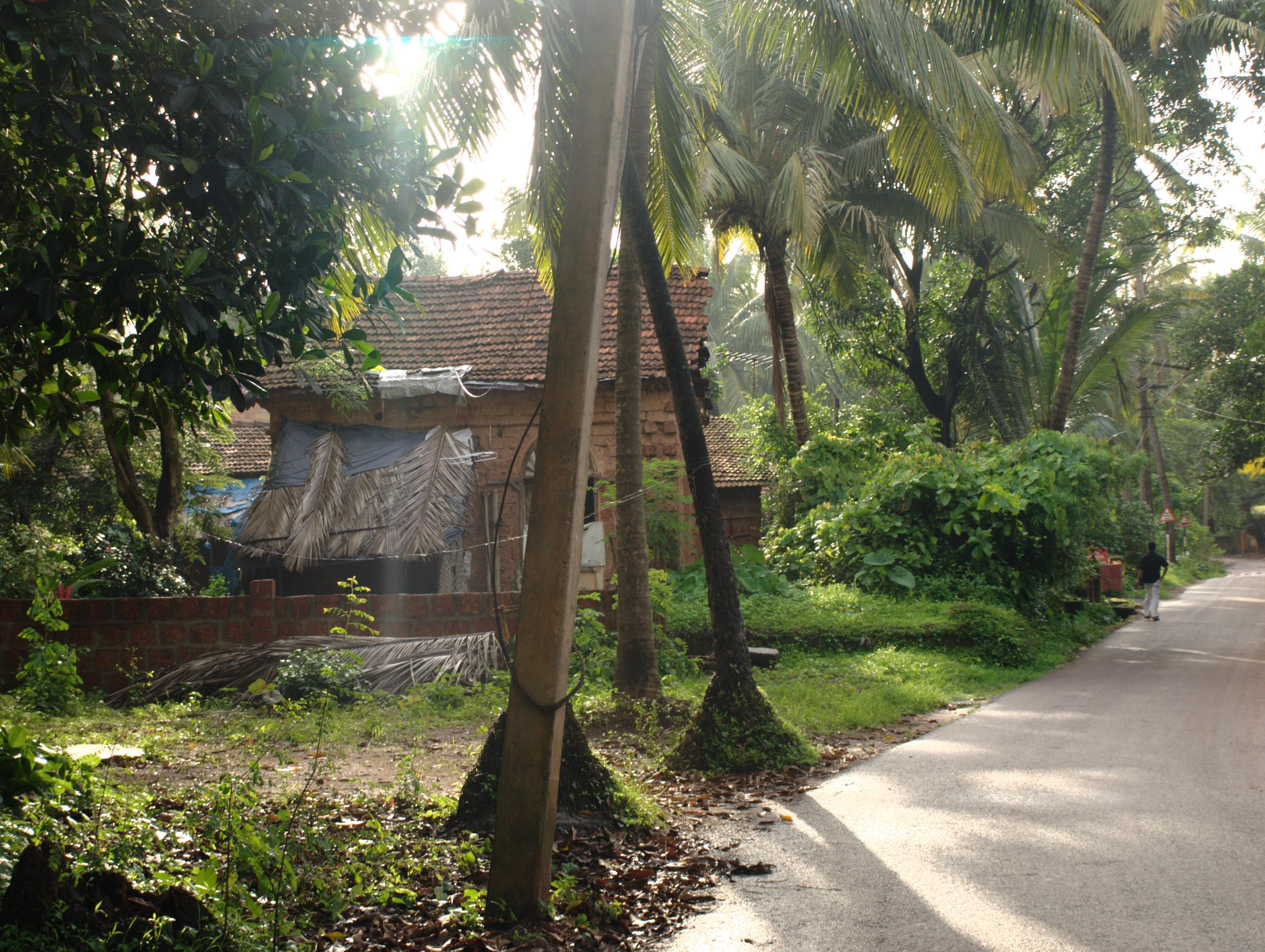
Road in Parra, Goa (Parra)

It is close to the town of Mapusa and the villages of Saligao, Calangute, Assagao, Anjuna and Vagator. And has rice fields

== Village church ==
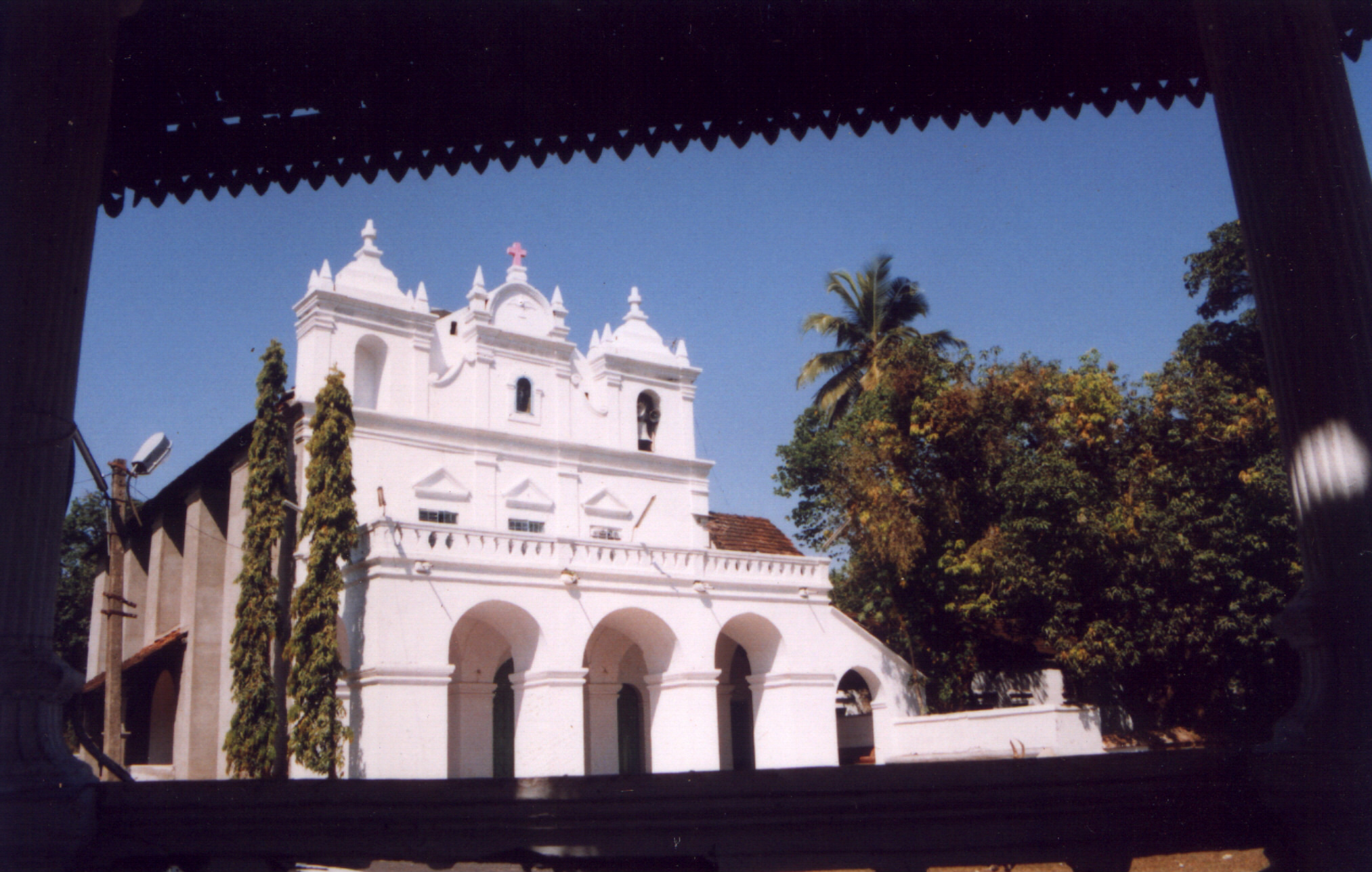
Church at Parra, Goa (Parra)

The Parra church is dedicated to St. Anne. According to José Lourenço, the Parra church, dedicated to St. Anne (Santa Ana or Santana), was built in 1649 and its feast is celebrated on the Sunday on or after July 26 each. year. By way of history, the rectorate of St Anne was established to cover the villages of Parra, Canca and Verla, all adjoining villages in the same locality. Earlier, the village was affiliated to the Nagoa Church, in another adjoining village. The first church was destroyed in 1683, but rebuilt with a vault in 1688. Its cemetery is said to have a "fine Rococo facade".

This church is built in the Mannerist Neo-Roman style. It is of large size with three bays and three storeys. A gable wall is visible behind the frontispiece. There are twin bell turrets which have "pagoda like" roofs. The finials are of a spear type. A curved pediment crowns the apex. There is a large porch with arched openings which has a flat roof with a balustrade.

=== History ===
The Parra Church was earlier home to the Franciscan Rectorate of St Anne. It covered the neighbouring villages of Parra, Cança and Verla, and was established between 1650 and 1653. It was initially affiliated to the Parish of Nagoa.

Parra's first church was burnt down by the Marathas in 1683, and rebuilt in 1688, as currently existing.

== Religious orders ==
Parra is today home to a number of religious Orders and congregations of religious women. These include:

- Salesians of Don Bosco (SDB), based at the Don Bosco Youth Welfare Centre, Naikavaddo.
- Society of the Catholic Apostolate of Pallottines (SAC), at the Villa de Palloti, Silva Waddo.
- Franciscan Sisters of St Mary of the Angels at Jyoti Nivas, D'Mello Vaddo Canca.
- Fatima Sisters, at Pereira Social Welfare Centre, Colcondem, Verla and at Xavier Dhaam, Colcondem, Verla.

Other institutions include chapels without chaplains in the parish:

- Our Lady of the Rosary Chapel, Verla
- Our Lady of Piety Chapel, Parra

== Village structure ==
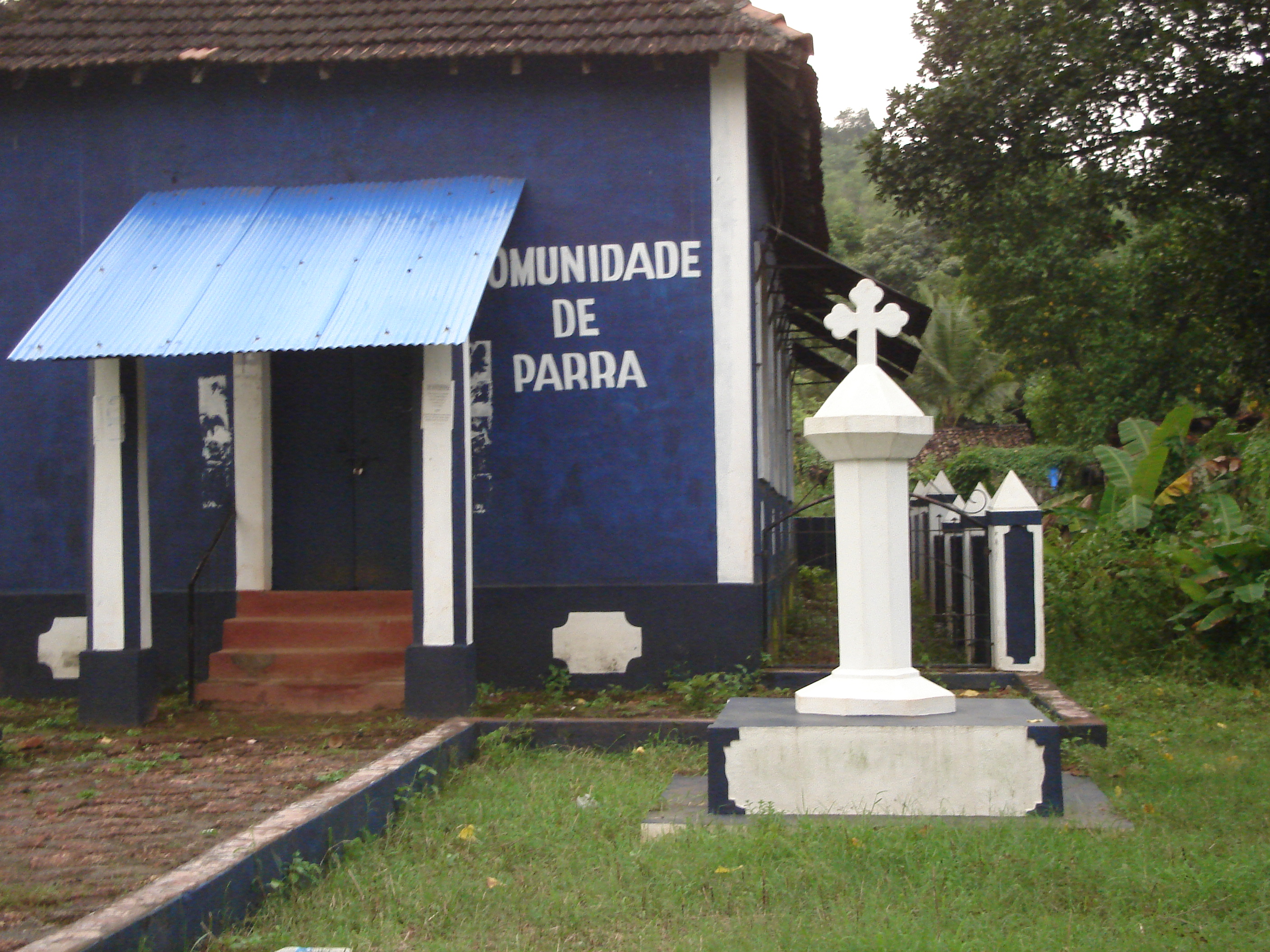
Comunidade office at Parra in Goa (Parra)

Parra covers a fairly vast land area, but most of it is agricultural land with pockets of residential land. A resident of Parra is popularly known as a "Porrikar". Parra used to be famous for sweet, red watermelons.

== Issues linked to Parra ==
A controversy broke out in 2019 over "cleanliness tax" imposed on tourists clicking photographs on one of the scenic roads of the village. Meanwhile, a court case emerged over the lack of footpaths following the expansion of the Parra-Mapusa main road in Parra.

== Connection with former CM ==
Former Goa chief minister and ex-Defence Minister of India Manohar Parrikar was a most notable person who traced his ancestral roots to Parra, as reflected in his surname.

== Trivia ==
Parra's Catholic population is estimated at 4000, and the Feast of St Anne Church is celebrated on the Sunday that falls on or after July 26 each year.

Parra's PIN (postal index number) code is 403510.
