= Milan Basumatary =

Indian footballer (born 1997)

Personal information
- Date of birth: 2 September 1997 (age 29)
- Place of birth: Kokrajhar, Assam, India
- Position: Midfielder

Youth career
- Kokrajhar Football Academy
- AIFF Kalyani Regional Academy
- AIFF Elite Academy

Senior career*
Years	Team	Apps	(Gls)
2016–2018	Shillong Lajong		
2018	Oil India		

International career
- India U16
- India U19
- * Club domestic league appearances and goals

Milan Basumatary (born 2 September 1997) is an Indian professional footballer who plays as a midfielder.

== Career ==
=== Early career ===
Born in Kokrajhar, Assam, Basumatary started playing football in his village for the Kokrajhar Football Academy as part of the Sports Authority of India. In 2012, Basumatary led the Assam U15 side to the Mir Iqbal Hussain Trophy championship, being named as the tournament's top scorer and most valuable player. After his impressive performance, Basumatary joined the All India Football Federation Regional Academy in Kalyani and the AIFF Elite Academy. In 2014, Basumatary was a part of the Aspire Academy All-Stars and earned a trial at Dutch club, PSV Eindhoven.

=== Shillong Lajong ===
In January 2016, it was announced that Basumatary signed with I-League side, Shillong Lajong. On 24 January 2016, Basumatary made his professional debut for the club against Bengaluru FC. He came on as an 87th-minute substitute for Bipin Singh as Shillong Lajong lost 3–0.

=== Oil India ===
In 2018, he was signed by Duliajan-based club Oil India.

== International ==
Basumatary has represented India at the under-16 and under-19 sides.

== Career statistics ==
As of 5 February 2017

Club	Season	League			League Cup		Domestic Cup		Continental		Total	
Club	Season	Division	Apps	Goals	Apps	Goals	Apps	Goals	Apps	Goals	Apps	Goals
Shillong Lajong	2015–16	I-League	1	0	—	—	0	0	—	—	1	0
Shillong Lajong	2016–17	I-League	1	0	—	—	0	0	—	—	1	0
Career total			2	0	0	0	0	0	0	0	2	0

== Honours ==
Shillong Lajong

- Shillong Premier League: 2016, 2019
- Bodousa Cup: 2016
