= 2018–19 Santosh Trophy =

Tournament details
- Country: India
- Venue(s): Ludhiana, Punjab
- Dates: Qualifiers: 2–16 February 2019; Main: 8–21 April 2019
- Teams: Qualifiers: 35; Main: 10

Final positions
- Champions: Services (6th title)
- Runners-up: Punjab

Tournament statistics
- Matches played: 23
- Goals scored: 78 (3.39 per match)
- Top goal scorer(s): Ayush Adhikari (Delhi); Arif Shaikh (Maharashtra) (6 Goals)
- All statistics correct as of 21 April 2019.

The 2018–19 Santosh Trophy was the 73rd edition of the Santosh Trophy, the premier competition in India for teams representing their regional and state football associations.

Kerala were the defending champions, having defeated West Bengal in the final during the 2017–18 season, but both teams failed to qualify for the main round.

== Qualifiers ==
Following Ten teams have qualified :

- Assam
- Delhi
- Goa
- Karnataka
- Maharashtra
- Meghalaya
- Odisha
- Punjab
- Services
- Sikkim

== Group stage ==
=== Group A ===
Pos	Team	Pld	W	D	L	GF	GA	GD	Pts	Qualification
1	Services	4	3	1	0	10	2	+8	10	Advance to Semi-finals
2	Goa	4	3	1	0	9	5	+4	10	Advance to Semi-finals
3	Delhi	4	2	0	2	6	7	−1	6	
4	Meghalaya	4	1	0	3	4	10	−6	3	
5	Odisha	4	0	0	4	4	9	−5	0	

Source: soccerway
Rules for classification: 1) points; 2) head-to-head points; 3) head-to-head goal difference; 4) goal difference; 5) number of goals scored; 6) drawing of lots

8 April 2019	Goa	1–1	Services	Ludhiana
8:30 AM IST	Lalawmpuia Ralte 51'		Lallawmkima PC 54'	Stadium: Guru Nanak Stadium; Attendance: 100; Referee: Ashwin

8 April 2019	Delhi	1–0	Meghalaya	Ludhiana
4:00 PM IST	Adhikari 18'			Stadium: Guru Nanak Stadium

10 April 2019	Meghalaya	3–2	Odisha	Ludhiana
8:30 AM IST	Raikutshisha Buam 40', 73'; Enester Malngiang 45+2'		Chandra Muduli 7'; Prasanta Srihari 54'	Stadium: Guru Nanak Stadium

10 April 2019	Delhi	1–2	Services	Ludhiana
4:00 PM IST	Adhikari 28'		8' Bikash Thapa; 68' (pen.) Suresh Meitei	Stadium: Guru Nanak Stadium

12 April 2019	Delhi	2–4	Goa	Ludhiana
8:30 AM IST	Adhikari 78' (pen.), 87' (pen.)		Chaitan Komarpant 31'; Glan Martins 54'; Lalawmpuia Ralte 68'; Stendly Fernandes 90+4'	Stadium: Guru Nanak Stadium

12 April 2019	Odisha	0–2	Services	Ludhiana
4:00 PM IST			72' (pen.) Suresh Meitei; 87' Harikrishna	Stadium: Guru Nanak Stadium

14 April 2019	Meghalaya	0–5	Services	Ludhiana
8:30 AM IST			28', 44', 45+1' Lallawmkima PC; 73' Sabir Khan; 80'Sushil Shah	Stadium: Guru Nanak Stadium

14 April 2019	Goa	2–1	Odisha	Ludhiana
4:00 PM IST	Jessel Carneiro 14'; Sarineo Fernandes 17'		Arbin Lakra 54'	Stadium: Guru Nanak Stadium

16 April 2019	Delhi	2–1	Odisha	Ludhiana
8:30 AM IST	Adhikari 25', 66' (pen.)		10' Chandra Muduli	Stadium: Guru Nanak Stadium

16 April 2019	Goa	2–1	Meghalaya	Ludhiana
4:00 PM IST	Chaitan Komarpant 40'; Victorino Fernandes 58'		30' (pen.) Donborlang Nongkynrih	Stadium: Guru Nanak Stadium

=== Group B ===
Pos	Team	Pld	W	D	L	GF	GA	GD	Pts	Qualification
1	Punjab	4	3	0	1	8	5	+3	9	Advance to Semi-finals
2	Karnataka	4	2	1	1	12	7	+5	7	Advance to Semi-finals
3	Maharashtra	4	2	1	1	11	6	+5	7	
4	Assam	4	2	0	2	7	10	−3	6	
5	Sikkim	4	0	0	4	1	11	−10	0	

Source: soccerway
Rules for classification: 1) points; 2) head-to-head points; 3) head-to-head goal difference; 4) goal difference; 5) number of goals scored; 6) drawing of lots

9 April 2019	Assam	0–2	Punjab	Ludhiana
8:30 AM IST			46' (o.g.) Subhakshan Rabha; 87' Rajbir Singh	Stadium: Guru Nanak Stadium

9 April 2019	Karnataka	2–2	Maharashtra	Ludhiana
4:00 PM IST	Manvir Singh 30'; M Nikhil Raj 90+1'		18' Rohan Harish Shukla; 56' Sanket Salokhe	Stadium: Guru Nanak Stadium

11 April 2019	Karnataka	2–0	Sikkim	Ludhiana
8:30 AM IST	Gunashekar Vignesh 66'; Namgyal Bhutia 84'			Stadium: Guru Nanak Stadium

11 April 2019	Assam	3–2	Maharashtra	Ludhiana
4:00 PM IST	Bishnu Bordoloi 12'; Milan Basumatary 78'; Akrang Narzary 90+4'		54', 76' Arif Shaikh	Stadium: Guru Nanak Stadium

13 April 2019	Sikkim	1–3	Assam	Ludhiana
8:30 AM IST	Sonam Zangpo Bhutia 33' (pen.)		3' Milan Basumatary; 85' Sirandeep Moran; 90+2' Bishnu Bordoloi	Stadium: Guru Nanak Stadium

13 April 2019	Punjab	1–2	Maharashtra	Ludhiana
4:00 PM IST	Sukhpreet Singh 39'		78' (pen.), 90+4' Arif Shaikh	Stadium: Guru Nanak Stadium

15 April 2019	Karnataka	5–1	Assam	Ludhiana
8:30 AM IST	Biswa Kr Darjee 16'; Naorem Roshan Singh 18', 23'; Gunashekar Vignesh 25'; Mahesh Selva 31'		37' Bishnu Bordoloi	Stadium: Guru Nanak Stadium

15 April 2019	Punjab	1–0	Sikkim	Ludhiana
4:00 PM IST	Taranjit Singh 20'			Stadium: Guru Nanak Stadium

17 April 2019	Maharashtra	5–0	Sikkim	Ludhiana
8:30 AM IST	Aman Gaikwad 15'; Vinodkumar Chandrakishor Pandey 26'; Leander Dharmai 45'; Arif Shaikh 52', 54'			Stadium: Guru Nanak Stadium

17 April 2019	Karnataka	3–4	Punjab	Ludhiana
4:00 PM IST	Magnesh Silva 13'; Johan Peter 33'; Nikhil Raj 60'		Sukhpreet Singh 16'; Vikrant Singh 31', 43'; Amandeep Singh 73'	Stadium: Guru Nanak Stadium

== Knockout stage ==
=== Bracket ===
Semi-finals
19 April 2019
Services	1(4)
Karnataka	1(3)
19 April 2019
Punjab	2
Goa	1

Final
21 April 2019
Services	1
Punjab	0

=== Semi-finals ===
19 April 2019
15:45 IST

Services	1–1 (a.e.t.)	Karnataka
Lallawmkima PC 7'		Nikhil Raj 84'
Penalties
	4–3

Guru Nanak Stadium, Ludhiana
Attendance: 500
Referee: Williams Joy Koshy

19 April 2019
08:30 IST

Punjab	2–1	Goa
Jaspreet Singh 13'; Harjinder Singh 90+1'	Report	89' Ronaldo Oliveira

Guru Nanak Stadium, Ludhiana
Attendance: 500
Referee: M Sugandar

=== Final ===
21 April 2019
15:30 IST

Services	1–0	Punjab
Bikash Thapa 61'	Report

Guru Nanak Stadium, Ludhiana
Attendance: 3,262
Referee: Harish Kundu

== Goalscorers ==
6 goals

- Ayush Adhikari (Delhi)
- Arif Shaikh (Maharashtra)

5 goals

- Lallawkima PC (Services)

3 goals

- Bishnu Bordoloi (Assam)
- M Nikhil Raj (Karnataka)

2 goals

- Raikut Shisha Buam (Meghalaya)
- Milan Basumatary (Assam)
- Lalawmpuia Ralte (Goa)
- Chaitan Komarpant (Goa)
- Suresh Meitei (Services)
- Gunashekar Vignesh (Karnataka)
- Mahesh Selva (Karnataka)
- Naorem Roshan Singh (Karnataka)
- Chandra Muduli (Odisha)
- Sukhpreet Singh (Punjab)
- Vikrant Singh (Punjab)
- Bikash Thapa (Services)

1 Goal

- Glan Martins (Goa)
- Stendly Fernandes (Goa)
- Jessel Carneiro (Goa)
- Sarineo Fernandes (Goa)
- Victorino Fernandes (Goa)
- Ronaldo Oliveira (Goa)
- Prasanta Srihari (Odisha)
- Arvin Lakra (Odisha)
- Enestar Malngiang (Meghalaya)
- Donborlang Nongkynrih (Meghalaya)
- Manvir Singh (Karnataka)
- Namgyal Bhutia (Karnataka)
- Biswa Kr Darjee (Karnataka)
- Johan Peter (Karnataka)
- Rohan Shukla (Maharashtra)
- Sanket Salokhe (Maharashtra)
- Aman Gaikwad (Maharashtra)
- Vinodkumar Chandrakishor Pandey (Maharashtra)
- Lenader Dharmai (Maharashtra)
- Rajbir Singh (Punjab)
- Taranjit Singh (Punjab)
- Amandeep Singh (Punjab)
- Jaspreet Singh (Punjab)
- Harjinder Singh (Punjab)
- Harikrishna (Services)
- Sabir Khan (Services)
- Sushil Shah (Services)
- Bikash Thapa (Services)
- Akrang Narzary (Assam)
- Sirandeep Moran (Assam)
- Sonam Zangpo Bhutia (Sikkim)
