= Nikhil Raj =

Indian footballer

Personal information
- Full name: Nikhil Raj Murugesh Kumar
- Date of birth: 12 January 2001 (age 25)
- Place of birth: Bengaluru, Karnataka, India
- Position: Forward

Team information
- Current team: Kickstart
- Number: 21

Youth career
- 2016–2017: Roots FC

Senior career*
Years	Team	Apps	(Gls)
2017–	Kickstart		
2020	→ Indian Arrows (loan)	9	(0)
2021–2022	→ Odisha (loan)	6	(1)

International career^{‡}
2021	India U-23	1	(0)
- * Club domestic league appearances and goals as of 12:00, 31 December 2022 (UTC) ‡ National team caps and goals as of 12:00, 31 December 2022 (UTC)

Nikhil Raj Murugesh Kumar (born 12 January 2001) is an Indian professional footballer who plays as a forward for Kickstart in the Bangalore Super Division and I-League 2.

== Club career ==
Born in Bengaluru, Karnataka, Nikhil Raj made his senior debut with Indian Super League side Odisha.

=== Indian Arrows ===
In 2020, Nikhil Raj was loaned from Kickstart FC to Indian Arrows. On 26 January 2020, Nikhil made his debut for I- League side Indian Arrows against Real Kashmir. He played entire 90 minutes of the game, as they lost by 2–0.

=== Odisha ===
On 22 May 2020, Nikhil Raj joined Indian Super League club Odisha FC. On 5 December 2021, Nikhil made his debut for against Kerala Blasters and scored a goal in injury time. The match ended in a 1–2 victory for Kerala Blasters.
