= Ayush Adhikari =

Indian footballer (born 2000)

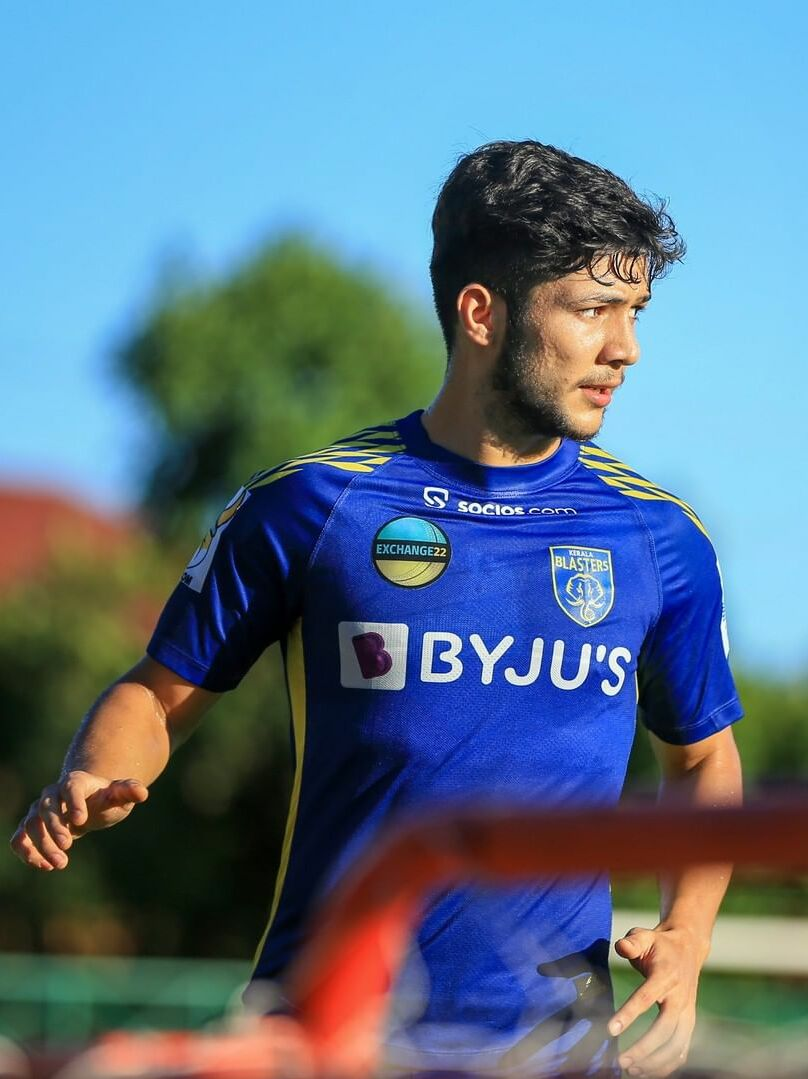
- Adhikari with Kerala Blasters in 2021

Personal information
- Full name: Ayush Adhikari
- Date of birth: 30 July 2000 (age 26)
- Place of birth: New Delhi, Delhi, India
- Height: 1.63 m (5 ft 4 in)
- Positions: Central midfielder; attacking midfielder

Team information
- Current team: Gokulam Kerala

Youth career
- 2014–2018: U Dream FA

Senior career*
Years	Team	Apps	(Gls)
2018–2019	Ozone	7	(0)
2019	Kerala Blasters B	0	(0)
2019–2020	→ Indian Arrows (loan)	13	(0)
2020–2023	Kerala Blasters	25	(0)
2023–2024	Chennaiyin	20	(0)
2024–2026	SC Delhi	22	(0)
2026–	Gokulam Kerala	0	(0)
- * Club domestic league appearances and goals as of 21:08, 17 May 2026 (UTC)

Ayush Adhikari (born 30 July 2000) is an Indian professional footballer who plays as a midfielder for Indian Football League club Gokulam Kerala.

== Club career ==
=== Youth and early career ===
After impressing for Delhi state team during the U14 nationals, Ayush was selected for the U Dream Football programme in Germany, where he spent almost four years. On his return to India, Ayush signed for Ozone FC. During the 2018–19 Santosh Trophy, Ayush finished as the top scorer with 6 goals despite his side failing to make the knockouts.

=== Kerala Blasters ===
In July 2019, he was signed by Kerala Blasters for their reserves side. However, he was loaned out to Indian Arrows in I-League.

He made his I-League professional debut for Indian Arrows on 28 December 2019 at Fatorda Stadium against Churchill Brothers, he started the match and was substituted in 86th minute as they won 1–2.

In 2020, Ayush was promoted into the senior side of the Blasters. He made his debut for the club against Hyderabad FC on 16 February 2021, by coming on as a substitute for Gary Hooper.

Ayush was named in the Blasters squad for the 2021 Durand Cup, where he appeared for the club in all the three matches of the tournament. He played his first match of the 2021–22 Indian Super League season in the season opener against ATK Mohun Bagan FC on 19 November 2021, which they lost 4–2. The following game, Adhikari made his first start for the Blasters in Indian Super League, on 25 November 2021, in a 0–0 draw to NorthEast United FC before being substituted for Puitea. On 4 February 2022, Ayush saw two yellows, resulting in a sent-off in his second start of the season against NorthEast United, which they also won with the score of 2–1 at full-time.

In April 2022, Ayush was included in the Kerala Blasters' reserve team and was appointed as their captain to participate in the inaugural edition of the Reliance Foundation Development League. Under his captaincy, they became runners up of the tournament and qualified for the NextGen Cup, which took place in United Kingdom. He also captained the side in the NextGen Cup.

=== Chennaiyin FC ===
In August 2023, Chennaiyin FC announced the signing of Ayush Adhikari ahead of the 2023-24 Indian Super League season. Chennaiyin paid a reported transfer fee of ₹50 lakhs to sign Ayush.

=== Hyderabad FC ===
On 18 August 2024, Ayush joined Hyderabad FC on a long-term contract. He debuted for the club on 19 September 2024, in an ISL league stage match against Bengaluru FC .

== Career statistics ==
=== Club ===
As of matches played till 12 April 2023

Appearances and goals by club, season and competition
Club	Season	League			Cup		Continental		Durand Cup		Total	
Club	Season	Division	Apps	Goals	Apps	Goals	Apps	Goals	Apps	Goals	Apps	Goals
Ozone	2018–19	I-League	7	0	0	0	—	—	—	—	7	0
Indian Arrows	2019–20	I-League	13	0	0	0	—	—	—	—	13	0
Kerala Blasters	2020–21	Indian Super League	1	0	—	—	—	—	—	—	1	0
Kerala Blasters	2021–22	Indian Super League	17	0	—	—	—	—	3	0	20	0
Kerala Blasters	2022–23	Indian Super League	7	0	2	0	—	—	—	—	9	0
Kerala Blasters	Kerala Blasters total		25	0	2	0	0	0	3	0	30	0
Total			45	0	2	0	0	0	3	0	50	0

== Honours ==
Kerala Blasters

- Indian Super League runner up: 2021–22
