= Rahul K. P. =

Indian association football player (born 2000)

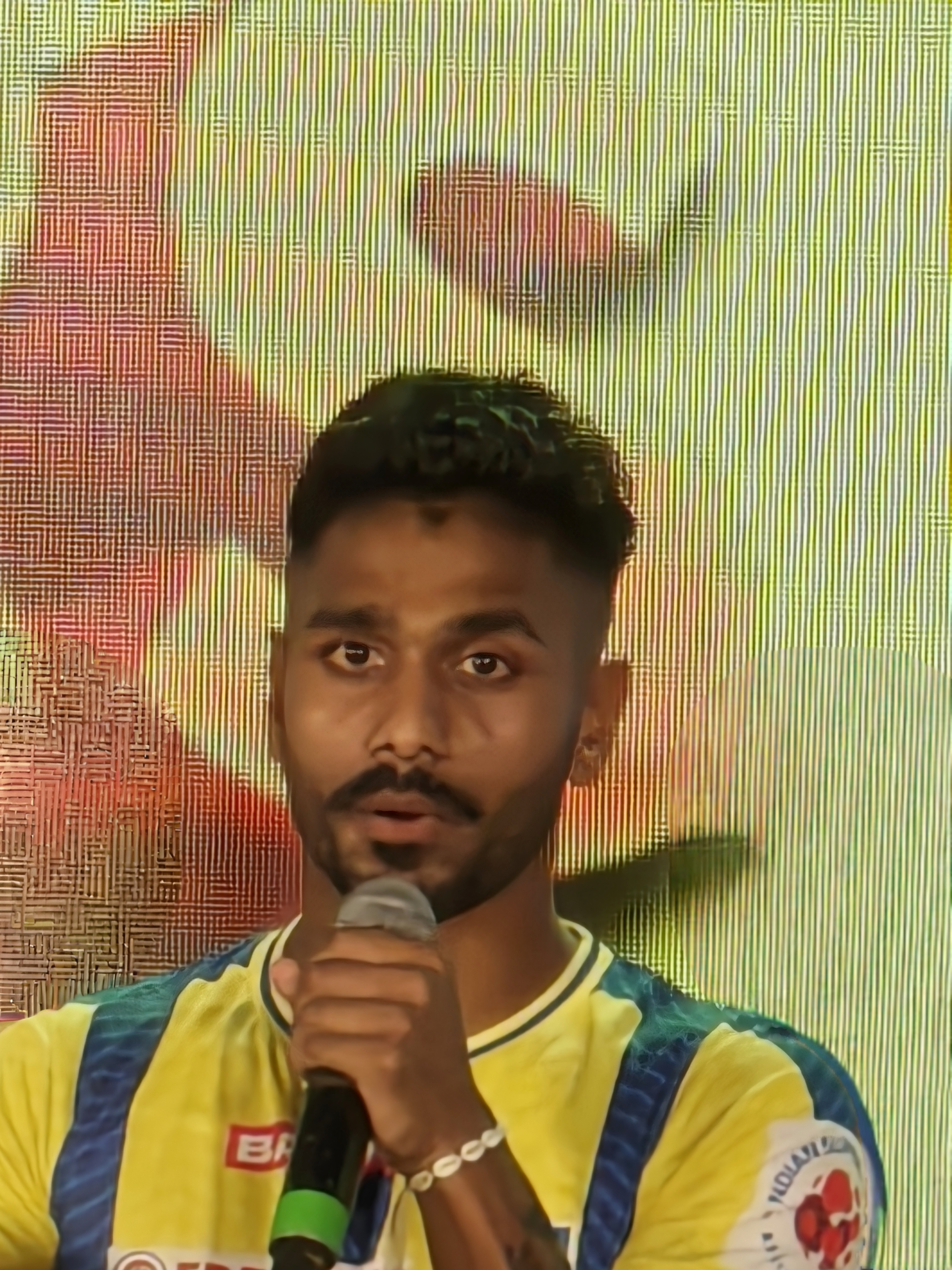
- Rahul with Kerala Blasters in 2024

Personal information
- Full name: Rahul Kannoly Praveen
- Date of birth: 16 March 2000 (age 26)
- Place of birth: Thrissur, Kerala, India
- Height: 1.67 m (5 ft 6 in)
- Position: Winger

Team information
- Current team: Odisha
- Number: 10

Youth career
- Kerala State Football Team
- AIFF Elite Academy

Senior career*
Years	Team	Apps	(Gls)
2017–2019	Indian Arrows	37	(5)
2019–2025	Kerala Blasters	81	(8)
2025–	Odisha	12	(3)

International career^{‡}
2015–2018	India U17	7	(0)
2017–2019	India U20	3	(0)
2019–2023	India U23	8	(1)
2022–2024	India	7	(0)
- * Club domestic league appearances and goals as of 16:30, 20 March 2026 (UTC) ‡ National team caps and goals as of 15:53, 18 January 2024 (UTC)

Rahul Kannoly Praveen (born 16 March 2000) is an Indian professional footballer who plays as a forward for Indian Super League club Odisha.

== Club career ==
=== Youth and early career ===
Born in Thrissur, Kerala, Rahul played for the Thrissur district under-14 football team and later for the Kerala football team in the same age group. He was the top goalscorer in the under-14 category of the national championship held at Kolkata in 2013. Following that performance, he was selected into the AIFF Elite Academy who was preparing for the 2017 FIFA U-17 World Cup to be hosted in India. After playing in the tournament, Rahul was selected to play for the Indian Arrows, an All India Football Federation-owned team that would consist of U-20 players to give them playing time. He made his professional debut for the side in the Arrows' first match of the season against Chennai City. He started and played the whole match as Indian Arrows won 3–0.

A month later, on 26 December, Rahul scored his first professional goal against Shillong Lajong. His 91st-minute goal was the last for the Arrows in a 3–0 victory. He scored again for the club in their next match against Mohun Bagan on 29 December. This time, his 33rd-minute goal was the equalizer as the Indian Arrows drew the match 1–1. He became the first Indian player to score in the Indian Super Cup 2019 by scoring against Mumbai City FC during the qualification round.

=== Kerala Blasters: 2019–2025 ===
On 19 March 2019, he signed for Indian Super League club Kerala Blasters. He made his debut on October 24, 2019, coming off the bench in the 54th minute as Kerala lost 1–0 to Mumbai City. On November 22 he scored his first competitive goal for the club in the 34th minute of the match against Hyderabad from the assist of Sahal as Kerala Blasters lost 2-1 and became the second youngest goalscorer for the club after Deependra Negi. Even though he was ruled out in most matches due to injuries, Rahul made a total of eight appearances during the season.

In September 2020, Rahul extended his contract with the Blasters until 2025. On 13 December, he scored his first goal of the 2020-21 season in the South Indian Derby against Bengaluru. Rahul once again scored against Bengaluru FC on 20 January 2021. He scored the crucial winner in the 94th minute of the game, sealing the victory for Blasters.

In 2021, he was named in the Kerala Blasters squad for 2021 Durand Cup, where he played all three matches for the club in the tournament. Rahul played his first match of the 2021–22 Indian Super League season on 19 November in the season opener against ATK Mohun Bagan and assisted for the goal scored by Sahal Abdul Samad, before being substituted due to an injury. The Blasters later confirmed that Rahul had suffered a partial tear on the groin muscle and would be out of action for minimum four weeks. He came back to pitch in the match against Hyderabad on 23 February 2022, where he assisted to the only goal scored by the Blasters in their 2–1 defeat against the Nizams. Rahul scored his first goal of the season in the final match of the 2021–22 ISL season against Hyderabad on 20 March, where his goal gave the lead for the Blasters initially, but the Blasters lost in penalty shoot-out after Hyderabad equalized in the last moments of the regular 90 minutes.

On 25 November 2022, Rahul assisted Sahal for a goal in the 85th minute in a 3–0 away win against NorthEast United FC and won the Hero of the Match Award. He scored his first goal of the season against ATK Mohun Bagan on 16 October, where he scored a long-range goal in the 81st minute, but the Blasters lost the match 2–5 at full-time. His second goal of the season was the winner against Chennaiyin FC on 7 February 2023, which the Blasters won 2–1 after Rahul's goal helped the Blasters to secure a comeback in the Southern Derby. Rahul was sent-off after receiving a second yellow against ATK Mohun Bagan in the returning fixture on 18 February, as the Blasters lost the match by a score of 2–1. After the Blasters' elimination from the ISL season, Rahul was included in the Blasters' squad for the 2023 Indian Super Cup. He played his first match of the tournament on 8 April as a substitute against RoundGlass Punjab FC for the Greek striker Dimitrios Diamantakos in the 67th minute, which they won 3–1 after Rahul scored the last goal for the Blasters in the last seconds of the additional time.

Rahul began his 2023–24 season with the match against Gokulam Kerala FC on 13 August 2023 in the 2023 Durand Cup tournament, where he came in as a substitute for Nihal Sudeesh, but they lost by the score of 3–4 at full-time.

After making 89 appearances and scoring 9 goals across all competition for the Blasters for, Rahul left the Blasters in the 2025 winter transfer window, ending his more than five years stint at the club. He was the second most-capped Blasters' player at the time of his departure only behind Sahal.

=== Odisha ===
On 6 January 2025, Odisha FC announced the signing of Rahul on a two-year deal until 2027.

==== West Ham United – TST ====
On 23 May 2025, West Ham United announced that Rahul would represent the club at the 2025 edition of The Soccer Tournament (TST), a seven-a-side competition. In doing so, he became the first Indian player ever to be selected by a Premier League club for this event.

On 4 June 2025, he made his debut for West Ham United's TST side in a 3–1 group stage win over Brown Ballers FC. He showcased impressive nimble footwork on the right wing. He featured in all three of the team's group stage matches, playing against Brown Ballers FC, Villarreal, and Tenfifteen FC.

== International career ==
=== Youth ===
Rahul represented the India under-17 team which participated in the 2017 FIFA U-17 World Cup for which India was the host nation. He made his debut in the U-17 World Cup on 6 October 2022 in a 3–0 loss against the United States. Rahul later went on to play for the India under-20 team and the India under-23 team.

=== Senior ===
On 20 September 2022, Rahul was named in India's squad for the Hung Tinh Friendly football tournament in Vietnam. He made his first senior appearance for India on 24 September 2022 in a 1–1 draw against Singapore by coming as a substitute for Ashique Kuruniyan in the 68th minute. He was a member of the Indian team for the 2022 Asian Games. He was the only goal scorer in a 1–5 loss against China.

== Personal life ==
In May 2021, Rahul was signed as the first ever South-Indian brand ambassador of MyFitness, India's first U.S. FDA registered Peanut Butter brand.

== Style of play ==
Rahul primarily plays as a right-winger and can be also deployed as a left-winger. He is naturally right-footed and is known for his speed, explosiveness, dribbling and work rate. Rahul has also been deployed as a striker on several games.

== Career statistics ==
=== Club statistics ===
As of matches played till 16 August 2023

Club	Season	League			Super Cup		Continental		Other		Total	
Club	Season	Division	Apps	Goals	Apps	Goals	Apps	Goals	Apps	Goals	Apps	Goals
Indian Arrows	2017–18	I-League	17	2	1	1	–		–		18	3
Indian Arrows	2018–19	I-League	20	3	2	0	–		–		22	3
Indian Arrows	Total		37	5	3	1	0	0	0	0	40	6
Kerala Blasters	2019–20	Indian Super League	8	1	0	0	–		–		8	1
Kerala Blasters	2020–21	Indian Super League	17	3	0	0	–		–		17	3
Kerala Blasters	2021–22	Indian Super League	7	1	0	0	–		3	0	10	1
Kerala Blasters	2022–23	Indian Super League	19	2	3	1	–		–		22	3
Kerala Blasters	2023–24	Indian Super League	19	0	–		–		2	0	21	0
Kerala Blasters	2024–25	Indian Super League	11	1	–		–		–		11	1
Kerala Blasters	Total		81	8	3	1	0	0	5	0	89	9
Odisha FC	2024–25	Indian Super League	8	1	1	0	–		–		9	1
Odisha FC	2025–26	Indian Super League	8	2	–		–		–		8	2
Odisha FC	Total		16	3	1	0	0	0	0	0	17	3
Career total			134	16	7	2	0	0	5	0	146	18

=== International ===
As of 21 November 2023

National team	Year	Apps	Goals
India	2022	2	0
India	2023	4	0
India	2024	1	0
Total		7	0

== Honours ==
Kerala Blasters

- ISL Cup runner-up: 2021–22
