= Nihal Sudeesh =

Indian footballer (born 2001)

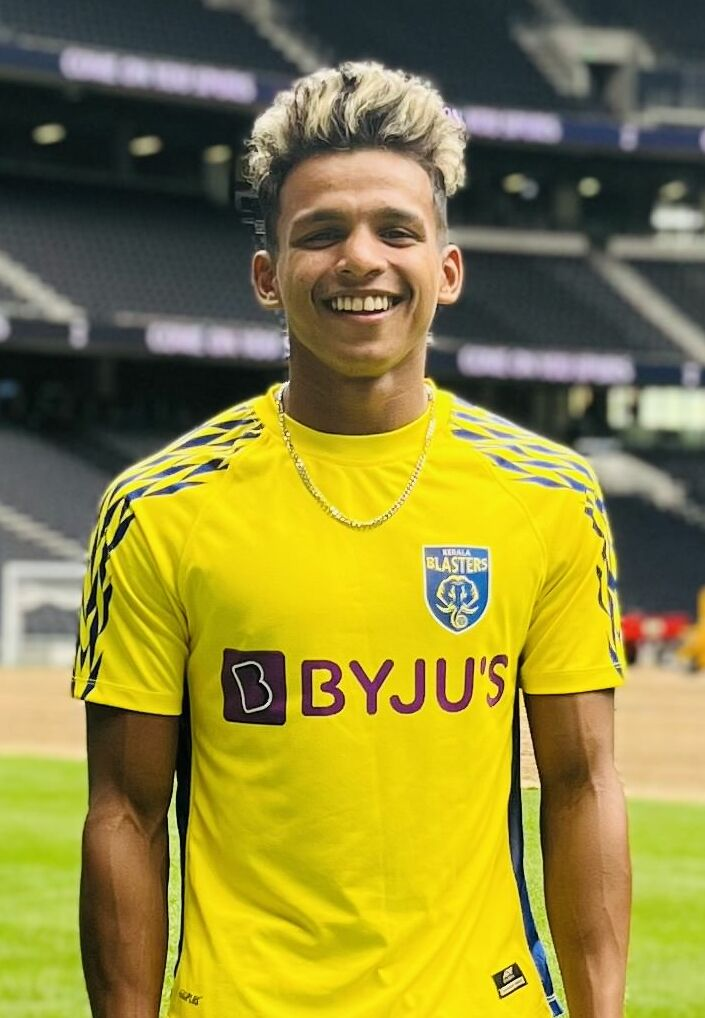
- Nihal with Kerala Blasters in 2022

Personal information
- Full name: Nihal Sudeesh
- Date of birth: 18 June 2001 (age 25)
- Place of birth: Kochi, Kerala, India
- Height: 1.72 m (5 ft 8 in)
- Position: Winger

Team information
- Current team: Odisha

Youth career
- FA Cochin
- Kerala Blasters

Senior career*
| Years | Team | Apps | (Gls) |
| 2019–2021 | Kerala Blasters B | 2 | (0) |
| 2022–2026 | Kerala Blasters | 23 | (2) |
| 2024–2025 | → Punjab (loan) | 20 | (1) |
| 2026– | Odisha | 2 | (0) |
- * Club domestic league appearances and goals as of 17 October 2026

Nihal Sudeesh (born 18 June 2001) is an Indian professional footballer who plays as a forward for Indian Super League club Odisha.

== Club career ==
=== Early life and career ===
Nihal was born in Kochi, Kerala on 18 June 2001. Nihal joined the reserve squad of the Kerala Blasters FC in 2019 and represented the side in the 2019–20 I-League 2nd Division season before leaving the club for the Durand Cup side Indian Navy in 2021. After quitting his job at Indian Navy, Nihal signed again for the Blasters' B team, where his performance in the 2022 Reliance Foundation Development League and in the 2022 Next Gen Cup earned him a promotion to the senior squad of Kerala Blasters.

=== Kerala Blasters FC ===
==== 2022–23: Debut season ====
In 2022, Nihal was included in the Kerala Blasters squad for the 2022–23 Indian Super League season. He was one among the seven native players for the club for the season. Nihal made his debut for the Blasters senior team in the Indian Super League on 23 October 2022 against Odisha FC by coming in as a substitute for Hormipam Ruivah in the 64th minute, but the Blasters lost the match 2–1 at full-time. He remained as an unused substitute for two months, and made his second appearance on 26 December in the returning fixture against Odisha as a substitute for Rahul KP in the 70th minute, which the Blasters won 1–0. Nihal was acclaimed by the media and fans for his short-performance against Odisha.

==== 2023–24: Contract extension ====
After an impressive debut season, Nihal signed a thee-year contract extension with the Blasters till 2026. He played his first match of the 2023–24 season on 13 August 2023 against Gokulam Kerala FC in the 2023 Durand Cup, which they lost by the score of 3–4 at full-time. On 12 April 2024, Nihal scored his first goal for the club in a 3–1 win against Hyderabad FC, after coming as a substitute in the 63rd minute.

==== 2024–2025: Loan to Punjab FC ====
On 9 July 2024, the Blasters announced that Nihal has been loaned to Punjab for a season long loan deal. On his second game for the club on 20 September, Nihal scored his first goal of the season against Odisha FC, helping Punjab in a 2–1 win. He was then named as the player of the match.

== Career statistics ==
As of 16 August 2023

Appearances and goals by club, season and competition
| Club | Season | League | | | Federation Cup/Super Cup | | Durand Cup | | AFC | | Total | |
| Club | Season | Division | Apps | Goals | Apps | Goals | Apps | Goals | Apps | Goals | Apps | Goals |
|---|---|---|---|---|---|---|---|---|---|---|---|---|
| Kerala Blasters FC B | 2019–20 | I-League 2 | 2 | 0 | — | — | — | — | — | — | 2 | 0 |
| Kerala Blasters FC B | 2022 | RFD League | 7 | 4 | — | — | — | — | — | — | 7 | 4 |
| Kerala Blasters FC B | Kerala Blasters B total | | 9 | 4 | — | — | — | — | — | — | 9 | 4 |
| Kerala Blasters | 2022–23 | Indian Super League | 5 | 0 | 1 | 0 | — | — | — | — | 6 | 0 |
| Kerala Blasters | 2023–24 | Indian Super League | — | — | — | — | 1 | 0 | — | — | 1 | 0 |
| Kerala Blasters | Kerala Blasters total | | 5 | 0 | 1 | 0 | 1 | 0 | — | — | 7 | 0 |
| Career total | | | 14 | 4 | 1 | 0 | 1 | 0 | — | — | 16 | 4 |
