= 2023–24 Kerala Blasters FC season =

10th season in existence of Kerala Blasters FC

Kerala Blasters
2023–24 season
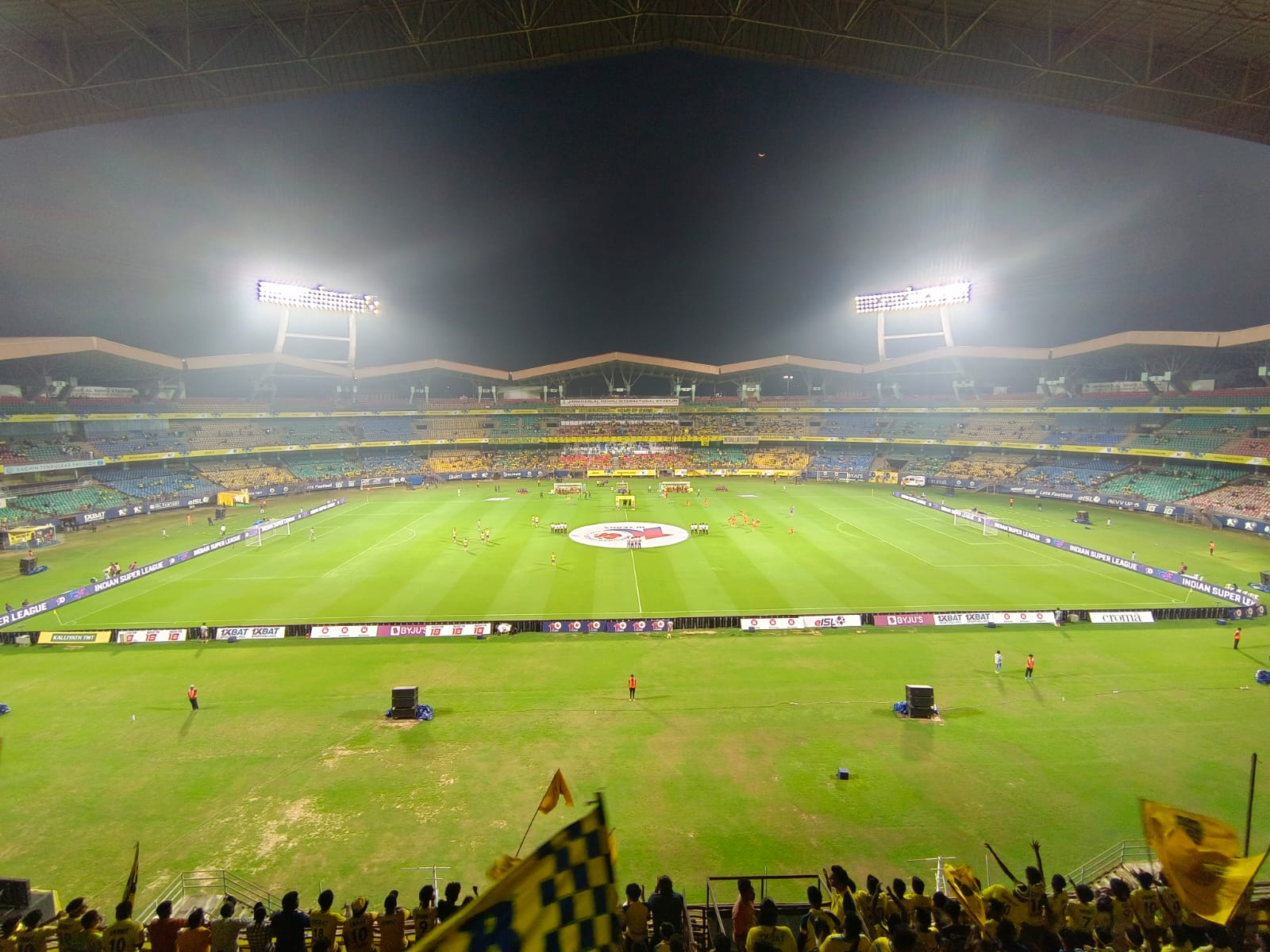
- Jawaharlal Nehru Stadium during a league match during the season.
- Owner: Magnum Sports Private Limited
- Chairman: Nikhil Bhardwaj
- Head coach: Ivan Vukomanović
- Stadium: Jawaharlal Nehru Stadium, Kochi, Kerala
- Indian Super League: 5th
- Indian Super Cup: Group stage
- Durand Cup: Group stage
- ISL Playoffs: Knockout
- Top goalscorer: League: Dimitrios Diamantakos (13); All: Dimitrios Diamantakos (16)
- Highest home attendance: 34,981; Kerala Blasters 2–0 Mumbai City FC, 24 December 2023
- Lowest home attendance: 17,650; Kerala Blasters 1–3 Punjab FC, 12 February 2024
- Average home league attendance: 27,518
- Biggest win: 5–0 (vs Indian Air Force (N), 21 August 2023, 2023 Durand Cup)
- Biggest defeat: 1–4 (vs NorthEast United FC (N), 20 January 2024, 2024 Indian Super Cup)
Home colours	Away colours	Third colours
- All statistics correct as of 3 May 2024, 13:52 (UTC).

The 2023–24 season was the tenth season in Kerala Blasters FC's existence, as well as their tenth season in the Indian Super League. It began in August 2023 with the 2023 Durand Cup and ended in April 2024 with the 2024 Indian Super League playoffs.

Following the 2022–23 season, the Blasters parted ways with their long-time assistant coach Ishfaq Ahmed, captain Jessel Carneiro, and their then-most-capped player, Sahal Abdul Samad. The club also made their most expensive signing its history by paying FC Goa a reported fee of ₹1.45 crores for the transfer of Aibanbha Dohling on a three-year contract. The Blasters played three friendly matches during their pre-season camp in Kerala, before travelling to United Arab Emirates for playing out three friendly matches against UAE Pro League sides.

The Blasters began their season with the 2023 Durand Cup. They played their first match of the season against Gokulam Kerala FC on 13 August in a 3–4 loss. With their 5–0 win over the Indian Navy FT in the tournament, the Blasters registered the highest win in their history, before getting eliminated from the competition after finishing third in the group with just four points. During the international breaks in January 2024, the Blasters took part in the 2024 Indian Super Cup. However, the Blasters were disqualified from the tournament following the two defeats in the rest of the group stage matches.

After finishing the regular season with 33 points at 5th spot in the table, the Blasters qualified for the league playoffs for the third consecutive time. They were subsequently knocked out of the knockout play-offs by Odisha FC. By the end of the football season, the Blasters had over a dozen injuries in their squad throughout the season coupled with a dozen suspensions, as the Blasters ended their 2023–24 season without silverware.

In the 3–3 draw against Chennaiyin FC in November, the Blasters's striker Diamantakos scored a brace and thus became the all-time top scorer for the Blasters with 16 goals across all competitions, surpassing the joint-record set by Ogbeche and Luna. The 2–0 win against Mumbai City at home on 24 December registered the highest match attendance of the season with 34,981 spectators. After netting 13 goals for the Blasters throughout the entire league season, Dimitrios Diamantakos won the league's Golden Boot award for topping the goal-scoring chart, and thus became the first Blasters player to win the award.

== Background ==
Kerala Blasters came into the 2023–24 season after a dramatic 2022–23 season. The club came into the 2022–23 season after becoming the runner-ups of the 2021–22 IndIan Super League season, but failed to register any trophies to their name at the end of the season. The season began with the Blasters sending their youth squad as their first team to the Durand Cup who was knocked out in the quarter-finals. This particular season was remarked by the Blasters' walk-off from the league's knockout stage match against their arch-rivals Bengaluru FC following their disagreement on the free-kick goal scored by Sunil Chhetri during the extra-time. The Blasters were eventually disqualified from the league's knockout stages, and were penalized by the All India Football Federation as a result of their walk-off. They ended their 2022–23 campaign with the group stage disqualification from the 2023 Indian Super Cup tournament, in which they failed to qualify for the knockout stages as a result of ending up third in the group stage.

== Pre-season overview ==
=== 2023 ===
==== April ====
On 18 April 2023, the Blasters announced that they have mutually parted ways with their assistant coach Ishfaq Ahmed.

On 24 April, the Blasters announced their squad for the Reliance Foundation Development League's national phase.

==== May ====
On 4 May, the Blasters announced that they have extended the contract of the Greek striker Dimitrios Diamantakos till the end of the 2023–24 season.

On 9 May, the Blasters announced the contract extension of youngsters Muhammad Saheef, Mohammed Azhar and Mohammed Aimen until 2026.

On 12 May, the Blasters announced the contract extension of the Indian midfielder Nihal Sudeesh till 2026 on a three-year contract.

On 16 May, the Blasters announced the signing of the Australian winger Jaushua Sotirio on a two-year deal after reaching an agreement with Newcastle Jets FC for an undisclosed transfer fee.

On 18 May, the Blasters announced that they have been granted ICLS Premier 1 license by the All India Football Federation.

On 19 May, AIFF announced the final Indian squad for the 2023 Intercontinental Cup and 2023 SAFF Championship, which consisted of the Blasters' players; Pritam Kotal (who was signed after the tournament), Jeakson Singh, and then Sahal Abdul Samad (whom would later leave the club during the pre-season).

On 19 May, the Blasters announced the contract extension of assistant coach Frank Dauwen till 2025.

On 21 May, the Blasters announced the contract extension of the Indian defender Hormipam Ruivah till 2027 on a four-year long-term contract.

On 30 May, the Blasters announced the departure of their club captain, Jessel Carneiro after four years with the club.

On 31 May, the Blasters announced the departures of Víctor Mongil, Apostolos Giannou, Ivan Kalyuzhnyi, Harmanjot Khabra and Muheet Shabir from the club as their contracts ended on the same day.

==== June ====
On 1 June, the Blasters announced the signing of the Indian right-back Prabir Das till 2026 on a three-year deal from their rivals Bengaluru FC.

On 2 June, the All India Football Federation's Appeal Committee rejected the Blasters' and their coach Ivan Vukomanović's appeal against their Indian rupees four crore's fine for abandonment of the last season's league knockout stage match against Bengaluru, and rejected Vukumanovic's appeal against the fine of Indian rupees five lakhs and 10-game ban imposed by the All India Football Federation's Disciplinary committee for calling the players off from the pitch amidst the game.

On 6 June, the Blasters announced that they have temporarily shut down their women's team after the men's side were fined by AIFF for their walk-off from the playoff match last season.

On 13 June, the Blasters announced the departure of their Indian left-back Denechandra Meitei after spending three years at the club.

On 14 June, the Blasters announced the loan departure of their Indian wing-back Nishu Kumar to East Bengal Club for the upcoming season.

On 16 June, the Blasters announced the one-year contract extension of their Indian goalkeeper Karanjit Singh till 2024.

On 22 June, the Blasters was ranked 70th in the CIES Football Observatory's weekly post of top 100 clubs in world with most social media followers, with the Blasters being the only club from India being featured in the list with 6.7 million followers across Twitter, Instagram and Facebook by the time of the release of the rankings.

On 24 June, it was announced that the Blasters have taken the appeal of the AIFF's sanctions on them as a result of their walk-off in the last season's knockout stage match against Bengaluru to the Court of Arbitration for Sport based in Switzerland.

On 26 June, the Blasters announced the signing of the Indian winger Bikash Singh Sagolsem till 2025 on a two-year contract with an option to extend, and was subsequently sent on loan to Mohammedan SC for the upcoming season.

==== July ====
On 1 July, the Blasters announced that their Indian midfielder Vibin Mohanan would travel to Greece for a one-month training stint with the Super League Greece club OFI Crete FC ahead of the season.

On 10 July, the Blasters appointed T. G. Purushothaman as their new first-team assistant head coach ahead of new season on a three-year contract till 2026.

On 11 July, the Blasters announced that the player arrivals for the pre-season camp of new season had begun in Kochi from 10 July 2023.

On 12 July, the Blasters announced the departure of their first-choice goalkeeper Prabhsukhan Singh Gill to East Bengal Club for an undisclosed transfer fee.

On 13 July, the Blasters announced the loan signing of the Indian left-back Naocha Singh from Mumbai City FC until the end of the season.

On 14 July, the Blasters announced the departure of their most-capped player and their Indian midfielder Sahal Abdul Samad to Mohun Bagan Super Giant, who bought the latter for an undisclosed transfer fee in a swap deal with the Blasters acquiring the services of the Indian right-back Pritam Kotal from Mohun Bagan Super Giant on a three-year deal.

On 14 July, the Blasters announced that the Nigerian forward Justine Ojoka Emmanuel has joined their pre-season camp on a trial.

On 16 July, the Blasters announced that their Uruguayan midfielder Adrián Luna as their new number 10 ahead of the upcoming season.

On 17 July, the Blasters announced the contract extension of their Indian goalkeeper Sachin Suresh till 2026 on a three-year contract.

On 19 July, the Blasters provided a statement on the ankle injury sustained by their Australian winger Jaushua Sotirio during the training session in their pre-season camp and ruled him out of action till 2024 depending upon on the degree of the injury.

On 20 July, the Blasters announced the departure of their Indian central midfielder Ayush Adhikari after reaching an agreement with an unknown club for an undisclosed transfer fee.

On 25 July, the Blasters announced that their Australian winger Jaushua Sotirio has undergone a surgery following his injury in the pre-season camp.

On 28 July, the Blasters played their first pre-season friendly match against Maharaja's College football team, which they won 8–0. The match played at the training facility of the Blasters in Panampilly Nagar saw Bijoy Varghese and Bidyashagar Singh complete their respective braces in the first half and Rahul K. P.'s second-half brace and a single goal each from Dimitrios Diamantakos and Adrián Luna in the second-half stretched the final score 8–0 in favour of the Blasters.

==== August ====
On 1 August, the Blasters announced the loan signing of Indian goalkeeper Lara Sharma from Bengaluru FC till the end of the season.

On 8 August, the Blasters played their second pre-season friendly match against the Kerala Premier League club Kovalam FC, which they won 5–0 at 120 minutes. Jeakson Singh scored the first goal followed by a brace from the Nigerian forward Justine Emmanuel, who completed his brace. Later, a single scored by both Nihal Sudeesh and Muhammad Ajsal sealed a five-nil victory for the Blasters at full time for the match held in their training facility in Panampilly Nagar.

On 9 August, the Blasters announced their squad for the 2023 Durand Cup tournament.

On 10 August, the Blasters announced the signing of the Indian forward Ishan Pandita on a two-year deal with an option to extend for an additional year, and also confirmed his participation for the club in the 2023 Durand Cup tournament, which was hinted by the club during the squad announcement the previous day.

On 11 August, the Blasters announced the launching of their away-kit for the upcoming season.

== Season overview ==
=== 2023 ===
==== August ====

The Blasters' starting line-up for their first Durand Cup match of the season against Gokulam Kerala FC on 13 August 2023.

On 13 August, the Blasters played their first competitive match of the season against Gokulam Kerala FC in the Durand Cup, which they lost 3–4. Gokulam took the lead through Aminou Bouba but the Blasters retaliated through their trial player Justine Emmanuel who drew level with a goal resulted from a corner kick in the 35th minute. Sreekuttan V. S. restored the lead for Gokulam, who put the ball in goal with a header, and an own goal by the Blasters defender Naocha Singh gave Gokulam a two goal lead before half-time. Gokulam netted their fourth goal of the match through Abhijith K just two minutes after the resumption of the second-half. Blasters scored their second goal through Prabir Das, who scored his debut goal in his debut match in the 54th minute. Even though Adrián Luna scored the third goal for the Blasters in the 77th minute, they could not avoid a defeat as the Blasters began their season with a 3–4 defeat at full-time.

On 14 August, the Blasters announced the signing of the Montenegrin centre-back Miloš Drinčić on a one-year deal.

On 16 August, the Blasters announced that they would be flying to United Arab Emirates from 5 September to 16 September as a part of their pre-season preparations.

On 16 August, the Blasters announced their fixtures for their pre-season tour in UAE.

On 17 August, the Blasters announced the departure of the Indian forward Muhammad Ajsal to I-League side Inter Kashi FC on a season-long loan deal.

On 18 August, the Blasters played their second group stage match of the 2023 Durand Cup tournament against rivals Bengaluru FC, which ended in a 2–2 draw. The Blasters took an early lead through Justine, who found the edge of the net in the 14th minute. Edmund Lalrindika's long-range ball in the 38th minute helped Bengaluru to find their equalizer and they took the lead just after the half-time through Ashish Jha, who completed a counter-attack by the Bengaluru to score the second goal of the night for Bengaluru in the 52nd minute of the match. Even though Bengaluru took the lead, the Blasters scored their second of the night through the substitute player Mohammed Aimen, who scored his debut goal for the Blasters in the 82nd minute. Hormipam Ruivah was shown a second-yellow and sent-off from the pitch due to a foul on the Bengaluru's forward Monirul Molla in the 86th minute, but the Blasters avoided a defeat, as the Southern Derby ended in a thrilling 2–2 draw, which resulted in their elimination from the tournament.

On 20 August, the Blasters announced the signing of the Ghanaian striker Kwame Peprah on a two-year deal.

The Blasters' starting line-up for their Durand Cup match against Indian Air Force FT on 21 August 2023.

On August 21, the Blasters played their last match of the 2023 Durand Cup against Indian Air Force which they won 5–0. The Blasters swiftly took control as Aimen opened the scoring in the 9th minute through a long-range shot. Just three minutes later, Bidyashagar Singh capitalized on an assist from Danish Farooq Bhat to double the advantage. The momentum continued into the second half, and Danish Farooq extended the Blasters' lead by finding the back of the net in the 57th minute. However, the spotlight remained on Bidyashagar, as he completed his hat-trick with two more goals in the 61st and 82nd minutes respectively to secure the three-points for the Blasters in what was a brief moment of success for the club in an otherwise disappointing tournament.

On 25 August, the Blasters announced the Indian multinational paint company, Asian Paints as their official paint partners for the upcoming season.

On 26 August, the Blasters announced that they would be playing a friendly match against Punjab FC in AIFF Centre of Excellence in Kolkata on 27 August.

On 27 August, the Blasters played their third friendly match of the season against the newly promoted ISL side Punjab FC, which they lost 2–3. Punjab scored an early goal, but Bidyashagar scored the equalizer for the Blasters from a Naocha Singh's ball before the half-time to level the game. Punjab were quick to retaliate as they scored two more goal in succession to give them a two goal lead. The Blasters scored their second of the evening through Drinčić, who came in a substitute for Ruivah in the 75th minute to head in a ball from a corner-kick, but it could not prove to be a vital goal as the Blasters lost the match 2–3 at the end of the day.

On 29 August, the Blasters announced the signing of Aibanbha Dohling from FC Goa on a three-year contract till 2026 for an undisclosed transfer fee, with the transfer subjecting to medicals.

On 29 August, AIFF announced the Indian squad for the 2023 King's Cup, in which two Blasters' players: Jeakson Singh and Rahul K. P. were included in the list.

On 31 August, the Blasters announced the signing of the Indian midfielder Freddy Lallawmawma from Punjab FC on a three-year contract till 2026 for an undisclosed transfer fee.

==== September ====
On 1 September, the Blasters announced the loan departures of Bijoy Varghese to Inter Kashi, Givson Singh to Odisha FC and Justine Emmanuel and Muhammed Saheef going to Gokulam Kerala respectively.

On 1 September, the Blasters announced that 1xBat SportingLines will continue as their presenting partners for the upcoming season.

On 2 September, the Blasters announced the signing of the Japanese winger Daisuke Sakai as their final foreign signing of the season in replacement for injured Jaushua Sotirio on a one-year deal till 2024.

On 2 September, the Blasters unveiled their home-kit for the upcoming season.

On 5 September, the Blasters announced Futureace Hospital as their medical partner for the upcoming season.

On 7 September, FSDL and the Indian Super League announced the fixtures for the first half of the 2023–24 ISL season, and it was decided that the Blasters would face their rivals Bengaluru FC in Kochi on 21 September in the opening match of the season.

On 7 September, the Blasters unveiled their third-kit for the upcoming season. An all green kit was unveiled replacing the traditional white third-kit.

On 8 September, the Blasters announced that they would be playing their friendlies against Sharjah FC and Shabab Al Ahli Club in closed doors, with only the match against Al Wasl F.C. being ticketed to the spectators.

On 9 September, the Blasters played their fourth friendly match of the season and the first match of their UAE tour against Al Wasl F.C., which they lost 0–6. Al Wasl scored two goals in succession through Nicolás Giménez and Adama Diallo, whom scored the opening two goals for the latter in the 19th and the 20th minutes respectively. However, it was not the end of scoring for both the players as Giménez and Diallo completed their braces before half-time to give Al Wasl a four-goal lead coming into the second-half. They would go on to extend the score-line as the Blasters conceded two more goals as Siaka Sidibe and Ali Salmeen found the net for Wasl in the second half to hand the Blasters a humiliating defeat in their first match of the UAE tour ahead of the season.

On 12 September, the Blasters announced Aifer Education as one of their partners for the upcoming season.

On 12 September, the Blasters played their fifth friendly match of the season and the second match of their UAE tour Sharjah FC, which they won 2–1. Daisuke Sakai opened the scoresheet for the Blasters, who netted a free-kick to give the Blasters their opening goal, and Kwame Peprah's goal some minutes later doubled the lead for the Blasters. Sharjah pulled one goal back before the half-time but a goalless second-half helped the Blasters to win their first match of the UAE tour by the score of 2–1 at full-time.

On 13 September, the AIFF announced the Indian squad for the 19th Asian Games, as two Blasters players: Rahul K. P. and Bryce Miranda were named in the list.

On 14 September, the Blasters announced that they would be playing their last match of the UAE tour against Al Jazirah Al Hamra Club instead of Shabab Al Ahli Club on the next day due to the changes in the UAE Pro League schedule.

On 15 September, Blasters played their sixth and last friendly match of the season against Al Jazirah Al Hamra, which they won 2–0. Bidyashagar's put the Blasters in front with a 35th-minute goal to give the Blasters a one-goal lead before the half-time. Pritam Kotal secured the win for the Blasters with a late goal, that resulted from a corner-kick in the injury-time of the second-half, as the Blasters ended their pre-season with a 2–0 win.

On 16 September, the Blasters announced Malayala Manorama as their media partner for the upcoming season.

On 19 September, the Blasters announced Kalliyath TMT as one of their associate sponsors for the upcoming season.

On 19 September, the Blasters announced ELANCE Learning Provider as one of their partners for the upcoming season.

On 19 September, the Blasters announced Revv Up as their fashion partner for the upcoming season.

On 20 September, the Blasters announced that ClubW would remain as their travel partner for the upcoming season.

On 20 September, the Blasters announced their squad for the upcoming league season.

On 20 September, the Blasters announced that their Uruguayan midfielder Adrián Luna would captain the side for the 2023–24 season.

The Blasters' starting line-up for their first league match of the season against rivals Bengaluru FC on 21 September 2023.

On 21 September, the Blasters played their first league match of the season in the season opener against the rivals Bengaluru FC, which they won 2–1. Bengaluru had the possession in the first-half but neither sides could find the net in the first forty-five minutes. The Blasters had the breakthrough in the 52nd minute when Bengaluru's midfielder Keziah Veendorp out the ball in his own net to give the Blasters their first goal of the match. The Blasters' captain Luna were quick to double the lead for the latter as he capitalized on a goalkeeping error committed by the opposition goalkeeper Gurpreet Singh Sandhu in the 69th minute. Even though the Blasters conceded a goal through Curtis Main in the 90th minute, the Blasters held on to the game till the last minute, as they won the Southern Derby 2–1 at full-time.

On 22 September, the Blasters released a statement regarding a 'derogatory action' made by a Bengaluru FC player towards one of their own players in the opening match of the league. They also announced that they had lodged a complaint with higher officials to initiate an investigation into the incident.

On 29 September, AIFF announced the Indian squad for the 2023 Merdeka Cup, in which only one Blasters' player, Jeakson Singh was included in the list.

On 30 September, the Blasters announced the launching of the youth development and grassroot centre under the banner of 'Young Blasters Sporthood Academy' in partnership with Blaster Sports Centre in the country of Qatar.

==== October ====
On 1 October, the Blasters played their second league match of the season against Jamshedpur FC, which they won 1–0. The match was characterized by a tightly contested battle for ball possession between both teams during the first half, resulting in no goals being scored. The score remained unchanged for the majority of the second-half, until the Blasters' captain, Luna, made a significant impact by scoring the only goal of the match in the 74th minute, with an assist from Dimitrios Diamantakos. This win marked a historic moment for the Blasters, as they secured consecutive victories in their first two games of the season, an accomplishment unprecedented in the club's history.

On 8 October, the Blasters played their third league match of the season against Mumbai City FC, which they lost 2–1. Mumbai City took the lead through the ex-Blasters player Jorge Pereyra Díaz, who put the ball in the Blasters' goal in the added time of the first-half. The Blasters levelled the score in the 57th minute through Danish Farooq Bhat, who headed in a well-placed ball from Sandeep Singh, but Mumbai City was soon to retaliate as Lalengmawia Ralte capitalized on a defensive error by the Blasters to give them a two goals to one lead in the 66th minute. Tensions rose among both the sides during the final minutes of the second-half which resulted in the Blasters' defender Miloš Drinčić and the Mumbai City's midfielder Yoell van Nieff to be sent-off in the added-time of the second-half, as the Blasters lost their first game of the season.

On 11 October, the Blasters released a statement on the injury sustained by their defender Aibanbha Dohling during the match against Mumbai City, which would rule him out for the rest of the season.

On 18 October, it was reported that the AIFF Disciplinary Committee has banned the Blasters' defender Miloš Drinčić for the next three matches following his sent-off in the match against Mumbai City.

On 18 October, the Blasters announced that their Indian defender Aibanbha Dohling has undergone a surgery following his injury during the match against Mumbai City FC.

On 20 October, it was reported that the AIFF Disciplinary Committee has banned the Blasters' defender Prabir Das for the next three matches due to the latter's 'aggressive actions against the referee' during the match against Mumbai City FC.

On 21 October, the Blasters played their fourth league match of the season against NorthEast United FC, which ended in a 1–1 draw. Blasters fell short early in the first-half when Néstor Albiach scored the opening goal for the NorthEast in the 12th minute of the match. Blasters responded to the goal in the second-half when Danish Farooq, who scored his second league goal of the season, drew level for the latter in the 49th minute from a Luna's assist that resulted from a free-kick. The match concluded with the both teams playing out in a 1–1 draw, as the Blasters drew their first match of the season.

On 27 October, the Blasters played their fifth league match of the season against Odisha FC which they won 2–1. Odisha took an early lead through Diego Maurício, who put the ball in the back of the net in the 15th minute of the game. Odisha received in a penalty just seven minute after their first goal but Sachin Suresh came to rescue for the Blasters as he saved the penalty taken by Maurício to deny Odisha a two goal lead. Odisha maintained their one goal lead up to the half-time, but Dimitrios Diamantakos, who came in as a substitute for Rahul K. P. scored the equalizer for the Blasters in the 66th minute. to score his first goal of the season from Daisuke Sakai's assist. Blasters took the lead in the 84th minute through Luna, who chipped one past the Odisha's goalkeeper Amrinder Singh to give the Blasters the lead, as the Blasters completed a comeback to win their third match of the season. This match was also marked by the return of the Blasters' head coach Ivan Vukomanović, who returned to the dugout for the first time this season after his ten-match ban imposed by AIFF-DC due to his actions in the last season.

==== November ====
On 3 November, the Blasters announced that their Indian midfielder Jeakson Singh has undergone a shoulder surgery following an injury sustained by the player during the match against Mumbai City FC on 8 October.

On 3 November, AIFF announced the 28-men probable squad for the first two matches of Round 2 of the 2026 FIFA World Cup and 2027 AFC Asian Cup Preliminary Joint Qualifiers as two Blasters' players: Ishan Pandita and Rahul K. P. were included in the list.

On 4 November, the Blasters played their sixth league match of the season against East Bengal FC which they won 1–2. Blasters took the lead in the 32nd minute through their Japanese midfielder Daisuke Sakai, who scored his debut goal to give the Blasters a one goal lead before the end of the first-half. The match was equally contested by both the sides throughout the second-half, and East Bengal was awarded with a penalty in the 85th minute which was saved by Sachin Suresh, who repeated his feat during the previous match against Odisha to deny the equalizer for East Bengal. Blasters were quick to retaliate as Diamantakos doubled the lead for the Blasters in the 88th minute and was subsequently sent-off due to receiving a second-yellow as a result of celebrating without the jersey. Even though East Bengal pulled one back through another penalty by Cleiton Silva in the end of the additional time, it could not stop them from losing as the Blasters won their fourth match of the season.

On 10 November, the Blasters announced the extension of their association with Dil Se India as their social change partner for the occurring season.

On 13 November, Blasters provided a statement on the bike accident sustained by their Indian midfielder Freddy Lallawmawma on 9 November during the international breaks while riding a motorcycle at Kundannoor, Kochi, which resulted in him getting admitted to a hospital after sustaining multiple injuries.

On 25 November, the Blasters played their seventh league match of the season against Hyderabad FC, which they won 1–0. The match was dominated by the Blasters throughout the first-half as their results paid-off in the 41st minute when the Blasters' defender Miloš Drinčić, who came back from a three-match suspension put the Blasters in front with his debut goal from a Luna's assist. Both the sides had their fare share of chances in the second-half but the Blasters were able to hold on to their lead as they won their fifth match of the season to move back to the top of the table.

On 29 November, the Blasters played their eighth league match of the season against the rivals Chennaiyin FC, which ended in a 3–3 draw. Chennaiyin took a quick early lead in the first minute through Rahim Ali's goal, but Blasters equalized through Diamantakos, who put the ball in the back of the net from the spot in the 11th minute. Chennaiyin were quick to react as they won a penalty just two minutes after the Blasters' drew level as the ex-Blasters' player Jordan Murray did no mistake and retained the lead for the visitors. Murray would complete his brace in the 24th minute to further extend their lead but Kwame Peprah's debut goal for the Blasters in the 38th minute proved to be crucial as the Blasters now trailed for only one goal by the end of the first-half. The deeply contested match between both the sides would witness its final act in the 59th minute, as Diamantakos scored his second of the night for the Blasters as they drew level with Chennaiyin for the second time in the game as the match ended 3–3 at full-time. With his second goal, Dimitrios Diamantakos became the all-time top scorer for the Blasters in their history with 16 goals, surpassing the joint-record of 15 goals set by Bartholomew Ogbeche and Adrián Luna.

==== December ====
On 3 December, the Blasters played their ninth match of the season against FC Goa, which they lost 1–0. The Blasters were in possession during the early moments of the match but could not capitalize their chances as they went one goal down just before the half-time in the added time when Rowllin Borges netted the ball to give Goa a one goal lead before going into the second-half. Neither sides would score on the second-half as the Blasters lost their second match of the season.

On 11 December, the AIFF-DC suspended the Blasters' coach Ivan Vukomanović for one-match and imposed a fine of ₹50,000 following his comments against the referees in a post-match press-conference on 29 November after the match against Chennaiyin FC.

On 13 December, the media outlets reported that the Blasters' captain Adrián Luna has been injured on his knee during the training session ahead of the match against Punjab FC and would be out for an indefinite amount of time, and would be subjected to a surgery in Mumbai, potentially ruling him out for the rest of the season.

On 14 December, the Blasters played their tenth match of the season against Punjab FC, which they won 0–1. Both the teams had their fare share of chances but none of them was able to capitalize on their chances ahead of the first-half. The match saw its only goal in the 51st minute, when the Blasters' Greek forward Diamantakos netted in a penalty which resulted from a foul on Mohammed Aimen in the penalty box. The Blasters held their momentum till the last minute as they won their sixth match of the season.

On 16 December, the Blasters released an official statement on the injury sustained by the Blasters' captain Adrián Luna, which mentioned that Luna underwent a minor arthroscopic surgery for the a chondral knee injury, which he sustained during a training session ahead of a matchday.

On 18 December, the draw for the group stage of the 2024 Indian Super Cup was conducted by the AIFF, in which the Blasters were drawn in the Group B alongside NorthEast United FC, Jamshedpur FC and the I-League's second spot finisher after the matches on 24 December 2023.

On 20 December, the AIFF announced the fixtures for the 2024 Indian Super Cup, in which the Blasters would start their campaign on 10 January 2024 against the I-League 2nd ranked team.

On 24 December, the Blasters played their eleventh match of the season in the returning fixture against Mumbai City FC, which they won 2–0. The last home match of the Blasters in 2023 saw them take the lead in the 11th minute through Diamantakos, who beat Jayesh Rane and Phurba Lachenpa of Mumbai City from a low cross from Peprah to take them ahead in the match. The Blasters fans, who came in numbers unveiled a tifo that read 'Recharge Luna' in the 10th minute as a tribute for their injured captain, Adrián Luna. The Blasters had their share of chances in the first-half, with Rahul K. P. coming close to scoring in the added time, but the Blasters would double their lead through Peprah, who was assisted back by Diamantakos in the injury time of the first-half, as the Blasters went to the second-half with a two goal lead. The team held on to their lead in the second-half as the Blasters won their seventh match of the season, which recorded the biggest match attendance of the season.

The Blasters' starting line-up for their first ever win against Mohun Bagan Super Giant on 27 December 2023.

On 27 December, the Blasters played their twelfth match of the season against Mohun Bagan Super Giant, which they won 0–1. Blasters took the lead in their last match of the year through their talisman Diamantakos, who scored his seventh goal of the season in the 9th minute of the match after dribbling past three Mohun Bagan defenders to give them an early lead. The Blasters dominated the first-half, and was able to retain their one goal lead till the last minute of the second-half, as they won their eighth match of the season, and also registered their first win over Mohun Bagan and Juan Ferrando in their history.

On 30 December, AIFF announced the 26-member Indian squad for the 2023 AFC Asian Cup, which consisted of the Blasters' players; Pritam Kotal, Ishan Pandita, and Rahul K. P.

On 31 December, the ISL named Pritam Kotal and Adrián Luna as two of the 'Best Players of the Year' in 2023, along with Dimitrios Diamantakos. who was named in the honorable mentions.

=== 2024 ===
==== January ====
On 1 January 2024, the ISL named the Blasters' win against Mohun Bagan Super Giant on 27 December 2023 as one of the 'Best Moments of the Year' in 2023.

On 9 January, the Blasters announced their squad for the 2024 Indian Super Cup.

On 10 January, the Blasters announced the signing of the Lithuania national team captain Fedor Černych on the winter transfer-window till the end of the season.

On 10 January, the Blasters played their first match of the Super Cup against Shillong Lajong FC, which they won 3–1. The Blasters took an early lead through Peprah, who scored his first of the match in the 14th minute to give them an early lead. Peprah was soon to complete his brace as he chested in a lobbing ball from Prabir Das in the 26th minute, as the Blasters doubled their lead. Just two minutes later, a tackle by the Blasters' goalkeeper Sachin Suresh on Karim Samb of Shillong resulted in the Blasters conceding a penalty, and Renan Paulino did no mistake and scored the only goal for Shillong Lajong in the match. The Blasters went in to the second-half with a single goal lead, and they further extended their lead through Aimen, who headed in a cross from Sakai to put the game to bed, as the Blasters won their first match of the tournament.

On 12 January, the Blasters announced that their reserve team players: Ebindas Yesudas, Korou Singh, Marvan Hussain and Aritra Das have started their training with the senior team in the Super Cup camp in Odisha.

On 15 January, the Blasters played their second match of the Super Cup against Jamshedpur FC, which they lost 2–3. The Blasters took the lead in the 29th minute through Diamantakos's penalty, who netted the ball in the back of the net, from a foul on Sakai. Jamshedpur would equalize through Daniel Chima Chukwu, who scored just minutes after the Blasters opened the scoresheet. Chukwu would complete his brace in the 57th minute to give Jamshedpur a lead, but the foul on Marko Lešković in the penalty-box in the 62nd minute helped Diamantakos to complete his brace, as the Blasters drew level after going one goal down, but the relief was short-lived as Jamshedpur found the net for the third time through Jérémy Manzorro, who scored a penalty in the 69th minute from a foul by Lešković, as the Blasters lost their first match of the tournament, and was also knocked out of the tournament.

On 20 January, the Blasters played their last match of the Super Cup against NorthEast United FC, which they lost 1–4. Parthib Gogoi gave an early lead for NorthEast in the second minute, followed by a second-half goal by Mohammed Ali Bemammer who doubled the lead for the latter. Diamantakos scored his third goal of the tournament to pull one goal back for the Blasters in the 70th minute, but Redeem Tlang and the former Blaster Jithin M. S. would two more goals for the NorthEast, as the Blasters suffered a painful 1–4 defeat in their last match of the tournament. This match also witnessed Korou Singh make his senior-team debut for the Blasters.

On 27 January, the Blasters released a statement on the injury sustained by their striker Kwame Peprah during the match against Jamshedpur in the Super Cup, which would rule him out for the rest of the season.

On 29 January, the Blasters announced that they have recalled their Nigerian forward Justine Emmanuel from his loan spell at I-League club Gokulam Kerala FC after the long-term injury sustained by their Ghanaian striker Kwame Peprah.

On 31 January, the Blasters announced the departure of the Indian foraward Bidyashagar Singh to Punjab FC, and the loan departure of the Indian winger Bryce Miranda to Punjab for the rest of the season.

On 31 January, the Blasters promoted the youngsters: Korou Singh and Aritra Das to the senior squad for the second-half of the league season.

==== February ====
On 2 February, the Blasters played their thirteenth match of the season against Odisha FC in the returning fixture, which they lost 2–1. Blasters took an early lead through Diamantakos, who scored his eighth league goal of the season in the 11th minute from Nihal Sudeesh's assist. The Blasters held on their lead up to the end of the first-half, but Roy Krishna of Odisha would complete a brace in the 54th and 58th minute, as the Blasters lost their third match of the season. This match was also the debut match for the Blasters' new signing, Fedor Černych.

On 12 February, the Blasters played their fourteenth match of the season against Punjab FC in the returning fixture, which they lost 1–3. The Blasters opened the scoresheet in the 39th minute through Drinčić, who scored a narrow goal off the crossbar to put the Blasters in the lead. Punjab were quick to react Wilmar Jordán levelled the match for Punjab just three minutes after the Blasters' goal. Jordán completed his brace in the 61st minute to take them ahead of the game, and a penalty goal by Luka Majcen in the 88th minute for Punjab led to the Blasters losing their first home game match of the season.

On 16 February, the Blasters played their fifteenth match of the season against Chennaiyin FC in the returning fixture, which they lost 1–0. After a goal-less first-half, a 60th-minute goal by Aakash Sangwan for the Chennaiyin led to the Blasters lose their fifth match of the season.

On 20 February, the Blasters provided a statement on the shoulder injury sustained by their goalkeeper Sachin Suresh during the match against Chennaiyin, and ruled him out for a significant duration.

The Blasters' starting line-up for their highest-scoring league match of the season against FC Goa on 25 February 2024.

On 25 February, the Blasters played their sixteenth match of the season against FC Goa in the returning fixture, which they won 4–2. Goa drew the first blood when they scored an early goal in the match in the 7th minute through Rowllin Borges, and just ten minutes later, they would double their lead through Mohammad Yasir as Blasters went down by two goals by the end of the first-half. Following a foul on Diamantakos in the 50th minute, the Blasters were awarded with a free-kick near the penalty box which was put into the net by Sakai in the 51st minute. Sakai himself would pave the way for the equalizer for the Blasters, as his cross to find Černych made contact with Goa's Carl McHugh's hand in the penalty box in the 81st minute, and Diamantakos made no mistake and levelled the game for the Blasters. Diamantakos would complete his brace just three minute after the equalizer in the 84th minute, as he capitalized on a spilt ball by Goa's goalkeeper to put the Blasters ahead of the game. An emphatic comeback was completed when the new signing Černych scored his debut goal in the 88th minute from Diamantakos's assist, as the Blasters scored three goals in the last ten minute to win their ninth match of the season, as well as to win their first match after five continuous defeats across cup and the league.

==== March ====
On 2 March, the Blasters played their seventeenth match of the season against Bengaluru FC in the returning fixture, which they lost 1–0. Neither side scored a goal in the first-half, but an 89th-minute goal by Javi Hernández for Bengaluru led the Blasters to lose their sixth match of the season.

On 13 March, the Blasters played their eighteenth match of the season against Mohun Bagan Super Giant in the returning fixture, which they lost 3–4. Armando Sadiku gave Mohun Bagan an early one-goal lead through a 4th-minute goal, as the visitors held the upper-hand by the end of the first-half. The Blasters drew level through Vibin Mohanan in the second-half, who scored his debut goal for the Blasters in the 54th minute of the game. Just six minutes later, Sadiku completed his brace to restore Mohun Bagan's lead, but the Blasters were quick to react as Diamantakos scored his 12th goal of the season to level the match once again for the Blasters in the 63rd minute. Deepak Tangri scored the third goal for Mohun Bagan just three minutes after Diamantakos levelled the match for the Blasters, and their lead was further doubled by an injury-time goal (90+7 minutes) by Jason Cummings. Blasters would score their final goal of the match through Diamantakos, who completed his brace just two minutes after Cummings' goal, but the last kick of the match was not enough to save the Blasters, as they lost their seventh match of the season in a seven-goal thriller.

On 30 March, the Blasters played their nineteenth match of the season against Jamshedpur FC in the returning fixture, which they drew 1–1. In a deeply contested match, the Blasters opened the scoresheet in the 23rd minute, where their marksman Diamantakos capitalized on a deflected pass from Justine to give them a lead. However, Jamshedpur would equalize in the 45th minute through Javier Siverio, and a goal-less second half following the Jamshedpur's equalizer led the match to end in a draw, resulting in a third draw of the season for the Blasters.

==== April ====
On 2 April, following Punjab FC's defeat over Odisha FC, the Blasters qualified for the playoffs for the fifth time in their history, as well as for the third consecutive time under Ivan Vukomanović.

On 3 April, the Blasters announced that their goalkeeper Sachin Suresh has successfully undergone a surgery following his injury during the second match against Chennaiyin FC.

On 3 April, the Blasters played their twentieth match of the season against East Bengal FC in the returning fixture, which they lost 2–4. Černych put the Blasters in front with an open post goal in 23rd minute. Jeakson Singh, who was yellow carded 29th minute received a second yellow, and was sent-off in the 45th minute, and East Bengal would equalize on a penalty-kick which in the additional time of the first-half, which resulted of a Karanjit Singh's foul on the East Bengal, as the match remained in deadlock going into the second-half. Later, Saúl Crespo would score his second of the night in the 71st minute to give the visitors the lead, and just three minutes later, the Blasters fell down to nine men as Naocha Singh was red carded for head-butting Aman CK. East Bengal they would double their lead through Naorem Mahesh Singh in 82nd minute, as the Blasters fell down by two goals. Hijazi Maher of East Bengal would score an own-goal in 84th minute for the Blasters from a miss-clearance of Sandeep's cross, Naorem Mahesh would complete his brace in the 87th minute to score the fourth goal for the visitors, as the Blasters lost their eighth match of the season. This match also saw the youngster Aritra Das making his senior team debut for the Blasters.

Following the match against East Bengal, Naocha Singh, who was red-carded after the head-butting incident was suspended for three match and was fined for Indian rupees 20,000 by the AIFF-DC.

On 6 April, the Blasters played their twenty first match of the season against NorthEast United FC in the returning fixture, which they lost 2–0. After a goal-less first-half, NorthEast United would score two late goals in 84th minute and during injury time through Néstor Albiach and Jithin M. S. respectively as the Blasters lost their tenth match of the season.

On 12 April, the Blasters played their twenty second and their last regular season match against Hyderabad FC in the returning fixture, which they won 1–3. The Blasters held the upper-hand in the G. M. C. Balayogi Athletic Stadium as Mohammed Aimen broke the deadlock in the 34th minute from a Saurav Mandal's cross to give the Blasters the lead. It was also the debut league goal for Aimen. The Blasters went into the second-half with a one-goal lead, and a goal from Daisuke Sakai, who scored from a low cross from Saurav himself, in the 51st minute doubled the lead for the Blasters. It took the Blasters another thirty more minutes to triple their lead, as the substitute Nihal Sudeesh scored his debut goal for the club in the 81st minute from an Aimen's assist. The Blasters could not keep a clean-sheet as João Victor scored the consolation goal for Hyderabad in the 88th minute, but the Blasters held their momentum till the final whistle and won their tenth match of the season, thus ending the regular season with a win. The win against Hyderabad also meant that the Blasters would play Odisha FC in the knockout play-offs in the Kalinga Stadium.

On 19 April, the Blasters played the knockout play-offs match against Odisha FC in the Kalinga Stadium, which they lost 2–1. The Blasters held the upper hand in the first-half, but ended the half with a lot of uncapitalized chances. It was not until 67th minute, when Fedor Černych opened the score-sheet and gave the lead for the Blasters from an assist from Aimen.However, the Blasters could not defend their lead, as Diego Maurício scored the equalizer for the home side in the 87th minute. The match went into the extra-time, and Isak Vanlalruatfela scored the winner for the Odisha in the 98th minute, as the Blasters exited the league, and ended their 2023–24 season without a trophy. This match also saw the return of their captain Luna following his injury in the first-half of the season.

On 4 May, following the league's final match, Dimitrios Diamantakos won the league's Golden Boot after having scored thirteen goals across the season from seventeen matches. He thus became the first player in the club history to win a Golden Boot award.

== Players ==
As of 2 February 2024

=== First-team squad ===
Notes:

- Table below mentions the squad registered by the club for the 2023–24 Indian Super League season.
- Flags indicate national team as defined under FIFA eligibility rules. Players may hold more than one non-FIFA nationality.
- Player^{*} – Players who joined the club permanently or on loan during the season.
- Player^{†} – Players who were not registered by the club for the 2023–24 season.

No.	Name	Nat.	Pos.	Footedness	Date of birth (age)	Height	Last Club	Transfer Fee	Year	Till	Notes
Goalkeepers
1	Karanjit Singh	(India)	GK	Right	8 January 1986 (age 40)	1.86 m (6 ft 1 in)	(India) Chennaiyin FC	Free transfer	2021	2024	N/A
23	Lara Sharma*	(India)	GK	Right	1 October 1999 (age 27)	1.92 m (6 ft 4 in)	(India) Bengaluru FC	Loan transfer	2023	2024	N/A
31	Sachin Suresh	(India)	GK	Right	18 January 2001 (age 25)	1.83 m (6 ft 0 in)	Youth System	N/A	2021	2026	N/A
99	Mohammed Arbaz	(India)	GK	TBC	20 January 2003 (age 23)	TBC	(India) Sreenidi Deccan FC	Free transfer	2023	TBC	Left out of the Durand Cup squad.
Defenders
3	Sandeep Singh	(India)	RB/CB/LB	Right	1 March 1995 (age 31)	1.79 m (5 ft 10 in)	(India) TRAU FC	Free transfer	2020	2025	N/A
4	Hormipam Ruivah	(India)	CB	Right	25 January 2001 (age 25)	1.83 m (6 ft 0 in)	(India) RoundGlass Punjab FC	Free transfer	2021	2027	N/A
15	Miloš Drinčić	(Montenegro)	CB/LB	Right	14 February 1999 (age 27)	1.95 m (6 ft 5 in)	(Belarus) FC Shakhtyor Soligorsk	Free transfer	2023	2024	Signed after the Durand Cup squad was announced.
20	Pritam Kotal	(India)	CB/RB	Right	9 September 1993 (age 33)	1.80 m (5 ft 11 in)	(India) Mohun Bagan Super Giant	Swap deal (Note: Swap deal with Mohun Bagan SG for Sahal Abdul Samad.)	2023	2026	N/A
27	Aibanbha Dohling	(India)	LB/CB	Right	23 March 1996 (age 30)	1.76 m (5 ft 9^{1}/_{2} in)	(India) FC Goa	₹1.45 crore	2023	2026	Left out of Super Cup squad due to an injury.
33	Prabir Das	(India)	RB	Right	20 December 1993 (age 32)	1.72 m (5 ft 8 in)	(India) Bengaluru FC	Free transfer	2023	2026	N/A
50	Naocha Singh*	(India)	LB	Left	24 August 1999 (age 27)	1.68 m (5 ft 6 in)	(India) Mumbai City FC (on loan)	Loan transfer	2023	2024	N/A
55	Marko Lešković	(Croatia)	CB	Right	27 April 1991 (age 35)	1.88 m (6 ft 2 in)	(Croatia) GNK Dinamo Zagreb	Free transfer	2021	2024	N/A
66	Aritra Das	(India)	LB	Right	27 May 2003 (age 23)		Youth System	N/A	2024	TBC	Promoted from the reserve team during the Super Cup.
Midfielders
5	Jeakson Singh	(India)	CDM	Right	21 June 2001 (age 25)	1.86 m (6 ft 1 in)	Youth System	N/A	2019	2025	N/A
6	Freddy Lallawmawma	(India)	CDM	Right	27 July 2002 (age 24)	1.71 m (5 ft 7 in)	(India) Punjab FC	Undisclosed fee	2023	2026	Signed after the Durand Cup squad was announced.
8	Vibin Mohanan	(India)	CM	Right	6 February 2003 (age 23)	1.73 m (5 ft 8 in)	Youth System	N/A	2022	2024	N/A
10	Adrián Luna (Captain)	(Uruguay)	AM/LW/CM/CF	Right	12 March 1992 (age 34)	1.67 m (5 ft 6 in)	(Australia) Melbourne City FC	Free transfer	2021	2024	Left out of Super Cup squad due to an injury.
13	Danish Farooq Bhat	(India)	LM	Right	9 May 1996 (age 30)	1.85 m (6 ft 1 in)	(India) Bengaluru FC	₹25 lakhs	2023	2026	N/A
17	Saurav Mandal	(India)	RM/RW	Both	6 November 2000 (age 26)	1.75 m (5 ft 9 in)	(India) Churchill Brothers FC Goa	Undisclosed fee	2022	2025	N/A
22	Yoihenba Meitei	(India)	CM	Right	7 February 2004 (age 22)	1.55 m (5 ft 1 in)	Youth System	N/A	2023	2024	N/A
25	Korou Singh	(India)	LM/LW	Right	3 December 2006 (age 19)	TBC	Youth System	N/A	2024	TBC	Promoted from the reserve team during the Super Cup.
32	Mohammed Azhar	(India)	CM	Right	20 January 2003 (age 23)	1.73 m (5 ft 8 in)	Youth System	N/A	2023	2026	N/A
77	Nihal Sudeesh	(India)	RW	Right	18 June 2001 (age 25)	1.72 m (5 ft 8 in)	Youth System	N/A	2022	2026	N/A
81	Bryce Miranda	(India)	LW	Left	23 September 1999 (age 27)	1.75 m (5 ft 9 in)	(India) Churchill Brothers FC Goa	Undisclosed fee	2022	2026	Left the club on loan during the winter transfer-window.
Forwards
7	Rahul K. P.	(India)	RW/CF	Right	16 March 2000 (age 26)	1.66 m (5 ft 5 in)	(India) Indian Arrows	Free transfer	2019	2025	N/A
9	Dimitrios Diamantakos	(Greece)	ST	Left	5 March 1993 (age 33)	1.82 m (6 ft 0 in)	(Croatia) HNK Hajduk Split	Free transfer	2022	2024	N/A
14	Kwame Peprah	(Ghana)	ST	Left	16 December 2000 (age 25)	1.83 m (6 ft 0 in)	(Israel) Hapoel Hadera F.C.	Free transfer	2023	2025	Signed after the Durand Cup squad was announced.
19	Mohammed Aimen	(India)	CF/LW	Right	20 January 2003 (age 23)	1.73 m (5 ft 8 in)	Youth System	N/A	2023	2026	N/A
21	Daisuke Sakai	(Japan)	RW/LW/AM	Right	18 January 1997 (age 29)	1.67 m (5 ft 6 in)	(Thailand) Customs United F.C.	Free transfer	2023	2024	Signed after the Durand Cup squad was announced.
26	Ishan Pandita	(India)	CF	Right	26 May 1998 (age 28)	1.83 m (6 ft 0 in)	(India) Jamshedpur FC	Free transfer	2023	2025	N/A
30	Bidyashagar Singh	(India)	CF	Right	11 March 1998 (age 28)	1.73 m (5 ft 8 in)	(India) Bengaluru FC	Free transfer	2022	2024	Left the club during the winter transfer-window.
91	Fedor Černych	(Lithuania)	RW/LW/SS	Both	21 May 1991 (age 35)	1.83 m (6 ft 0 in)	(Cyprus) AEL Limassol	Free transfer	2024	2024	Signed after the Super Cup squad was announced.
24	Justine Emmanuel	(Nigeria)	RW	Right	13 April 2003 (age 23)	1.73 m (5 ft 8 in)	None	N/A	2023	2024	Named in the Durand Cup squad; later loaned out to Gokulam Kerala FC, before getting recalled midway the league season.
Unregistered Players
11	Jaushua Sotirio	(Australia)	RW/LW/CF	Right	11 October 1995 (age 31)	1.75 m (5 ft 9 in)	(Australia) Newcastle Jets FC	Undisclosed fee	2023	2025	Left out of season due to an injury.

Note:

Position	Number of players							Average age	Average height
Position	Home grown	Non-home grown	Senior	Reserves	Left-footed	Right-footed	Total	Average age	Average height
Goalkeepers	1	3	3	1	0	4	4	27 years, 13 days	1.87 m (6 ft 1 in)
Defenders	0	9	8	1	1	8	9	27 years, 201 days	1.80 m (5 ft 10 in)
Midfielders	3	8	5	6	1	10	11	23 years, 137 days	1.75 m (5 ft 8 in)
Attackers	3	7	9	1	2+1	7+1	10	25 years, 167 days	1.75 m (5 ft 8 in)
All	7	27	25	9	34		32	25 years, 144 days	1.79 m (5 ft 10 in)

==== Squad number changes ====
Notes:

- Players and squad numbers last updated on 2 February 2024.
- The list is sorted by new squad number.
- Player^{*} – Player who joined Kerala Blasters permanently or on loan during the season.
- Player^{†} – Player who departed Kerala Blasters permanently or on loan during the season

Player	Position(s)	Prev. No.	New No.	Prev. Player	Notes
(India) Lara Sharma*	GK	—	23	(Spain) Víctor Mongil	Mongil departed the club
(India) Mohammed Arbaz	GK	—	99	(Australia) Apostolos Giannou	Giannou departed the club
(India) Pritam Kotal	CB/RB	—	20	(Uruguay) Adrián Luna	Luna took the number 10 shirt
(India) Aibanbha Dohling	LB/CB	—	27	(India) Saurav Mandal	Saurav took the number 17 shirt
(India) Prabir Das	RB	—	33	(India) Vibin Mohanan	Vibin took the number 8 shirt
(India) Jeakson Singh	CDM	25	5	(India) Tejas Krishna S	Tejas departed the club
(India) Freddy Lallawmawma	CDM	—	6	(India) Danish Farooq Bhat	Danish took the number 13 shirt
(India) Vibin Mohanan	CM	33	8	(India) Ayush Adhikari	Adhikari departed the club
(Uruguay) Adrián Luna	AM/LW/CM/CF	20	10	(India) Harmanjot Singh Khabra	Khabra departed the club
(India) Danish Farooq Bhat	LM	6	13	(India) Prabhsukhan Singh Gill	Gill departed the club
(India) Saurav Mandal	RM/RW	27	17	(India) Rahul K. P.	Rahul took the number 7 shirt
(India) Yoihenba Meitei	CM	—	22	(India) Nishu Kumar^{†}	Nishu departed the club on loan
(India) Nihal Sudeesh	RW	28	77	(Ukraine) Ivan Kalyuzhnyi	Ivan departed the club after loan term
(India) Rahul K. P.	RW/CF	17	7	(India) Puitea	Puitea departed the club
(Ghana) Kwame Peprah	ST	—	14	(India) Jessel Carneiro	Carneiro departed the club
(Japan) Daisuke Sakai	RW/LW/AM	—	21	(India) Bijoy Varghese^{†}	Bijoy departed the club on loan
(India) Ishan Pandita	CF	—	26	(India) Abdul Hakku Nediyodath	Hakku departed the club
(Australia) Jaushua Sotirio	RW/LW/CF	—	11	(India) Givson Singh^{†}	Givson departed the club on loan
(Lithuania) Fedor Černych	RW/LW/SS	—	91	None	No played opted for number 91 prior to Černych
(India) Artira Das	LB	—	66	(India) Peter Carvalho	Carvalho departed the club
(India) Korou Singh	LM/LW	—	25	(India) Jeakson Singh	Jeakson took the number 5 shirt
(Nigeria) Justine Emmanuel	RW	14	24	(India) Prasanth Karuthadathkuni	Justine used number 14 during the Durand Cup, and then opted for number 24 after getting recalled from loan during the winter transfer-window

== Transfers ==
=== Transfers In ===
Date	Player	No.	Position(s)	Last Club	Contract Length	Transfer window	Fee	Refs.
16 May 2023	(Australia) Jaushua Sotirio	11	RW/LW/CF	(Australia) Newcastle Jets FC	2 years	Pre-season	Undisclosed fee	
1 June 2023	(India) Prabir Das	20	RB	(India) Bengaluru FC	3 years	Pre-season	Free transfer	
26 June 2023	(India) Sagolsem Bikash Singh	–	LW	(India) TRAU FC	2 years + Option to extend	Pre-season	Free transfer	
1 July 2023	(India) Mohammed Arbaz	99	GK	(India) Sreenidi Deccan FC	TBC	Pre-season	Free transfer	
13 July 2023	(India) Naocha Singh	50	LB	(India) Mumbai City FC	1 year (till the end of the season)	Pre-season	Loan transfer	
14 July 2023	(India) Pritam Kotal	20	CB/RB	(India) Mohun Bagan Super Giant	3 years	Pre-season	Swap deal with Sahal Abdul Samad	
1 August 2023	(India) Lara Sharma	23	GK	(India) Bengaluru FC	1 year (till the end of the season)	Pre-season	Loan transfer	
10 August 2023	(India) Ishan Pandita	26	CF	(India) Jamshedpur FC	2 years + 1 year	Pre-season	Free transfer	
14 August 2023	(Montenegro) Miloš Drinčić	15	CB/LB	(Belarus) FC Shakhtyor Soligorsk	1 year	Pre-season	Free transfer	
20 August 2023	(Ghana) Kwame Peprah	14	ST	(Israel) Hapoel Hadera F.C.	2 years	Pre-season	Free transfer	
29 August 2023	(India) Aibanbha Dohling	27	LB/CB	(India) FC Goa	3 years + 1 year	Pre-season	Undisclosed fee	
31 August 2023	(India) Freddy Lallawmawma	6	CDM	(India) Punjab FC	3 years	Pre-season	Undisclosed fee	
2 September 2023	(Japan) Daisuke Sakai	21	RW/LW/AM	(Thailand) Customs United F.C.	1 year	Pre-season	Free transfer	
10 January 2024	(Lithuania) Fedor Černych	91	RW/LW/CF	(Cyprus) AEL Limassol	6 months	Winter transfer	Free transfer	

=== Loan Returns ===
Player	No.	Position	From
(India) Denechandra Meitei	19	LB	(India) Odisha FC
(India) Givson Singh	11	CM	(India) Chennaiyin FC
(Nigeria) Justine Emmanuel	24	RW	(India) Gokulam Kerala FC

=== Promoted from Reserves ===
No.	Name	Nationality	Position(s)	Date of birth (age)	Refs.
22	Yoihenba Meitei	(India)	CM	7 February 2004 (age 22)	
31	Sachin Suresh	(India)	GK	18 January 2001 (age 25)	
66	Aritra Das	(India)	LB	27 May 2003 (age 23)	
25	Korou Singh	(India)	LM/LW	3 December 2006 (age 19)	

=== Contract Extensions ===
No.	Position(s)	Player	Contract Till	Refs.
9	ST	(Greece) Dimitrios Diamantakos	2024	
2	CB	(India) Muhammad Saheef	2026	
32	CM	(India) Mohammed Azhar	2026	
19	CF/LW	(India) Mohammed Aimen	2026	
28	RW	(India) Nihal Sudeesh	2026	
4	CB	(India) Hormipam Ruivah	2027	
1	GK	(India) Karanjit Singh	2024	
31	GK	(India) Sachin Suresh	2026	

=== Loan Outs ===
No.	Position(s)	Player	To	Transfer window	Refs.
22	RB/LB	(India) Nishu Kumar	(India) East Bengal Club	Pre-season	
–	LW	(India) Sagolsem Bikash Singh	(India) Mohammedan SC	Pre-season	
–	LW	(India) Muhammad Ajsal	(India) Inter Kashi FC	Pre-season	
21	CB	(India) Bijoy Varghese	(India) Inter Kashi FC	Pre-season	
11	CM	(India) Givson Singh	(India) Odisha FC	Pre-season	
14	RW	(Nigeria) Justine Emmanuel	(India) Gokulam Kerala FC	Pre-season	
2	LB	(India) Muhammad Saheef	(India) Gokulam Kerala FC	Pre-season	
81	LW	(India) Bryce Miranda	(India) Punjab FC	Winter transfer	

=== Transfers Out ===
Exit Date	Player	No.	Position(s)	To	Transfer window	Fee	Refs.
30 May 2023	(India) Jessel Carneiro	14	LB	(India) Bengaluru FC	Pre-season	Free transfer	
31 May 2023	(Spain) Víctor Mongil	23	CB/CDM	TBC	Pre-season	Contract expired	
31 May 2023	(Australia) Apostolos Giannou	99	ST	TBC	Pre-season	Contract expired	
31 May 2023	(Ukraine) Ivan Kalyuzhnyi	77	CM	(Ukraine) FC Oleksandriya	Pre-season	End of loan term	
31 May 2023	(India) Harmanjot Khabra	10	RB/CM	(India) East Bengal Club	Pre-season	Free transfer	
31 May 2023	(India) Muheet Shabir	78	GK	(India) Real Kashmir FC	Pre-season	Contract expired	
13 June 2023	(India) Denechandra Meitei	19	LB	TBC	Pre-season	Contract termination	
12 July 2023	(India) Prabhsukhan Gill	13	GK	(India) East Bengal Club	Pre-season	Undisclosed fee	
14 July 2023	(India) Sahal Abdul Samad	18	CM/AM	(India) Mohun Bagan Super Giant	Pre-season	Undisclosed fee + Pritam Kotal	
20 July 2023	(India) Ayush Adhikari	8	CM	(India) Chennaiyin FC	Pre-season	Undisclosed fee	
31 January 2024	(India) Bidyashagar Singh	30	CF	(India) Punjab FC	Winter transfer	Free transfer	

=== Transfer summary ===
Note:

- This list is based on some of the transfer fee's as reported by the media.
- This list may not involve every transfer fee's involved in the Blasters' transfer window.

Expenditure ▼

Summer: ₹1,45,00,000

Winter: ₹0

Total expenditure: ₹1,45,00,000

Income ▲

Summer: ₹2,60,00,000

Winter: ₹0

Total income: ₹2,60,00,000

Net Total

Summer: ▲₹1,15,00,000

Winter: ₹0

Total: ▲₹1,15,00,000

== Management ==
As of 11 July 2023

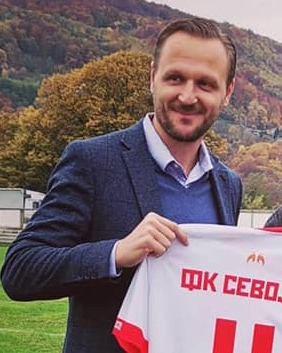
The Blasters' head coach, Ivan Vukomanović

Role	Nationality	Name	Year Appointed	Previous club	Refs.
Head coach/Manager	Serbia	Ivan Vukomanović	2021	(Cyprus) Apollon Limassol FC (as interim coach)	
Assistant Coach	Belgium	Frank Dauwen	2022	(Belgium) K Beerschot VA (as assistant coach)	
Assistant Coach	India	T. G. Purushothaman	2023	(India) Kerala Blasters U18 (as manager)	
Strength and Conditioning Coach	Belgium	Werner Martens	2021	(Slovakia) AS Trenčín (as assistant coach)	
Goalkeeping Coach	Serbia	Slaven Progovecki	2021	(Serbia) Red Star Belgrade U19 (as goalkeeping coach)	

== Pre-season and friendlies ==
The Blasters did not announce their pre-season friendly schedule prior to the matchday but they announced on 28 July 2023 that they would be playing against the football team of Maharajas College from Ernakulam. Their friendly match against Kovalam FC was not formally announced by the Blasters but the score-line was published by the latter at the end of the full-time. On 16 August, in the midst of the 2023 Durand Cup tournament, the Blasters announced that they would be travelling to United Arab Emirates between 5 September to 16 September for their pre-season preparations, and announced their fixtures in the UAE tour against the UAE Pro League clubs Al Wasl F.C., Sharjah FC, and also against their reigning league champions Shabab Al Ahli Club. After the club's elimination from the 2023 Durand Cup, the Blasters announced that they would playing a friendly match against the newly promoted ISL side Punjab FC on 27 August, ahead of their UAE tour. During the UAE tour, the Blasters were originally scheduled to play Shabab Al Ahli on 15 September in their last pre-season friendly match ahead of the ISL season, but they pulled-out of the friendly as a result of their change in the schedule in the UAE Pro League, and as a result, the Blasters replaced Shabab Al Ahli with the UAE's second tier club Al Jazirah Al Hamra Club, against whom they played the game on the scheduled date.

28 July 2023 1	Kerala Blasters	8–0	(India) Maharaja's College	Kadavanthra, Kochi, Kerala
16:00 IST	Bidyashagar TBC', TBC'; Bijoy TBC', TBC'; Luna TBC'; Diamantakos TBC'; Rahul TBC', TBC'	Report		Stadium: Panampilly Nagar Ground; Attendance: Null; Referee: TBC; Man of the Match: Null

8 August 2023 2	Kerala Blasters	5–0	(India) Kovalam	Kadavanthra, Kochi, Kerala
16:00 IST	Jeakson TBC'; Justine TBC'; Sudeesh TBC'; Ajsal TBC'	Report		Stadium: Panampilly Nagar Ground; Attendance: Null; Referee: TBC; Man of the Match: Null
Note: According to Kovalam FC's Twitter handle, the match was played for 120 minutes with the Blasters scoring only 2 goals in the regular 90 minutes.

27 August 2023 3	Kerala Blasters	2–3	(India) Punjab	New Town, Kolkata
15:30 IST	Bidyashagar TBC'; Drinčić TBC'	Report	TBC TBC'; TBC TBC'; TBC TBC'	Stadium: AIFF National Center of Excellence; Attendance: Null; Referee: TBC; Man of the Match: Null

9 September 2023 4	Kerala Blasters	0–6	(United Arab Emirates) Al Wasl	Dubai, United Arab Emirates
20:30 IST; 19:00 GST		Report	Giménez 16', 22'; Diallo 19', 38'; Sidibe 60'; Salmeen 82'	Stadium: Zabeel Stadium; Attendance: TBC; Referee: TBD; Man of the Match: Null

12 September 2023 5	Kerala Blasters	2–1	(United Arab Emirates) Sharjah	Sharjah, United Arab Emirates
20:30 IST; 19:00 GST	Sakai TBC'; Peprah TBC'	Report	TBC TBC'	Stadium: Sharjah Stadium; Attendance: Closed doors Referee: TBC; Man of the Match: Null

15 September 2023 6	Kerala Blasters	2–0	(United Arab Emirates) Al Jazirah Al Hamra	Dubai, United Arab Emirates
19:15 IST; 17:45 GST	Bidyashagar 35'; Kotal 90+1'	Report		Stadium: Rashid Stadium; Attendance: Closed doors Referee: TBC; Man of the Match: Null
Note: The Blasters were originally scheduled to play the UAE's first tier club Shabab Al Ahli Club on 15 September, but they pulled-out of the friendly as a result of their change in schedule in the UAE Pro League.

== Competitions ==
=== Overview ===
Win Draw Loss

Competition	First match	Last match	Starting round	Final position	Record							
Competition	First match	Last match	Starting round	Final position	Pld	W	D	L	GF	GA	GD	Win %
Durand Cup	13 August 2023	21 August 2023	Group stage	Group stage	3	1	1	1	10	6	+4	33.33
Super Cup	10 January 2024	20 January 2024	Group stage	Group stage	3	1	0	2	6	8	−2	33.33
Super League	21 September 2023	12 April 2024	Matchday 1	5th	22	10	3	9	32	31	+1	45.45
Super League Playoffs	19 April 2024	19 April 2024	Knockout play-offs	Knockout play-offs	1	0	0	1	1	2	−1	0.00
Total					29	12	4	13	49	47	+2	41.38

Last updated: 1 May 2024.
Source: Soccerway

=== Durand Cup ===
Kerala Blasters were drawn in the Group C for the 132nd edition of the Durand Cup alongside their arch-rivals Bengaluru FC.

==== Group stage ====
Pos	Team	Pld	W	D	L	GF	GA	GD	Pts	Qualification	GOK	BEN	KER	IAF
1	Gokulam Kerala	3	2	0	1	6	5	+1	6	Qualify for the knockout stage	—	—	—	2–0
2	Bengaluru	3	1	2	0	5	3	+2	5		2–0	—	2–2	1–1
3	Kerala Blasters	3	1	1	1	10	6	+4	4		3–4	—	—	5–0
4	Indian Air Force	3	0	1	2	1	8	−7	1		—	—	—	—

Source: Twitter
Rules for classification: Group stage tiebreakers

==== Matches ====
Durand Cup fixtures were announced in early July 2023 with the Blasters facing Gokulam Kerala, a club from their own state, and their rivals Bengaluru and the Indian Air Force team respectively.

13 August 2023 1	Kerala Blasters	3–4	Gokulam Kerala	Maidan, Kolkata, West Bengal
14:00 IST	Emmanuel 35'; Luna (yellow card) 45', 77'; Das 54'; Azhar (yellow card) 72'	Report	Bouba 17'; Sreekuttan 43'; Naocha 45+1' (o.g.); Abhijith 47'	Stadium: Mohun Bagan Ground; Attendance: 397; Referee: Rahul Gupta; Man of the Match: Nili Perdomo (Gokulam Kerala)

18 August 2023 2	Bengaluru	2–2	Kerala Blasters	Santoshpur, Kolkata. West Bengal
18.00 IST	Lalrindika 38'; Jha 51'	Report	Emmanuel 14'; Ruivah (yellow card) 42' (yellow-red card) 85'; Aimen 84'	Stadium: Kishore Bharati Krirangan; Attendance: 412; Referee: Ramachandran Venkatesh; Man of the Match: Bekey Oram (Bengaluru FC)

21 August 2023 3	Kerala Blasters	5–0	Indian Air Force	Maidan, Kolkata, West Bengal
15.00 IST	Aimen 9'; Bidyashagar 12', 61', 82'; Mandal (yellow card) 41'; Farooq 57'	Report		Stadium: East Bengal Ground; Attendance: 97; Referee: Aditya Purkayastha; Man of the Match: Bidyashagar Singh (Kerala Blasters)

=== Indian Super League ===
==== League table ====
Pos	Team	Pld	W	D	L	GF	GA	GD	Pts	Qualification
3	Goa	22	13	6	3	39	21	+18	45	Qualification for the knockouts
4	Odisha	22	11	6	5	35	23	+12	39	Qualification for the knockouts
5	Kerala Blasters	22	10	3	9	32	31	+1	33	Qualification for the knockouts
6	Chennaiyin	22	8	3	11	26	36	−10	27	Qualification for the knockouts
7	NorthEast United	22	6	8	8	28	32	−4	26	

Source: Indian Super League
Rules for classification: 1) points; 2) head-to-head points; 3) head-to-head goal difference; 4) head-to-head goals scored; 5) goal difference; 6) number of goals scored; 7) fair play ranking

==== Results summary ====
===== League =====
Overall								Home						Away					
Pld	W	D	L	GF	GA	GD	Pts	W	D	L	GF	GA	GD	W	D	L	GF	GA	GD
22	10	3	9	32	31	+1	33	6	2	3	22	19	+3	4	1	6	10	12	−2

Last updated: 12 April 2024.
Source: Indian Super League

===== Playoffs =====
Overall								Home						Away					
Pld	W	D	L	GF	GA	GD	Pts	W	D	L	GF	GA	GD	W	D	L	GF	GA	GD
1	0	0	1	1	2	−1	0	0	0	0	0	0	0	0	0	1	1	2	−1

Last updated: 1 May 2024.
Source: Indian Super League

==== League results by round ====
Match	1	2	3	4	5	6	7	8	9	10	11	12	13	14	15	16	17	18	19	20	21	22
Ground	H	H	A	H	H	A	H	H	A	A	H	A	A	H	A	H	A	H	A	H	A	A
Result	W	W	L	D	W	W	W	D	L	W	W	W	L	L	L	W	L	L	D	L	L	W
League Position	1	2	4	4	2	1	1	1	2	2	2	1	3	4	5	4	5	5	5	5	5	5
Points	3	6	6	7	10	13	16	17	17	20	23	26	26	26	26	29	29	29	30	30	30	33

Updated to match(es) played on 12 April 2024. Source: Indian Super League
A = Away; H = Home; N = Neutral; W = Win; D = Draw; L = Loss

==== Matches ====
Note: FSDL and the Indian Super League announced the fixtures for the first half of the season on 7 September. Meanwhile, the final half of the fixtures were announced on 25 January 2024.

21 September 2023 1	Kerala Blasters	2–1	Bengaluru	Kochi, Kerala
20:00 IST	Veendorp 52' (o.g.); Luna 69', (yellow card) 90+7'	Report	Carneiro (yellow card) 26'; Main 90'	Stadium: Jawaharlal Nehru Stadium; Attendance: 34,911; Referee: Rahul Gupta; Man of the Match: Adrián Luna (Kerala Blasters)

1 October 2023 2	Kerala Blasters	1–0	Jamshedpur	Kochi, Kerala
20:00 IST	Jeakson (yellow card) 60'; Luna 74'; Aiban (yellow card) 90+6'	Report	Doungel (yellow card) 37'; Lallawmawma (yellow card) 66'; Halder (yellow card) 82'	Stadium: Jawaharlal Nehru Stadium; Attendance: 34,518; Referee: Ramachandran Venkatesh; Man of the Match: Adrián Luna (Kerala Blasters)

8 October 2023 3	Mumbai City	2–1	Kerala Blasters	Mumbai, Maharashtra
20:00 IST	Díaz 45+4'; Ralte 66'; Nieff (yellow card) 82' (red card) 90+15'; Gurkirat (yellow card) 90+9'; Khayati (yellow card) 90+12'	Report	Jeakson (yellow card) 44'; Luna (yellow card) 45+5'; Danish 57'; Freddy (yellow card) 90+7'; Sandeep (yellow card) 90+9'; Das (yellow card) 90+15'; Drinčić (red card) 90+15'	Stadium: Mumbai Football Arena; Attendance: 6,911; Referee: Pratik Mondal; Man of the Match: Jorge Pereyra Díaz (Mumbai City)

21 October 2023 4	Kerala Blasters	1–1	NorthEast United	Kochi, Kerala
20:00 IST	Danish 49'; Rahul (yellow card) 90+6'	Report	Néstor 12'; Akhtar (yellow card) 21'; Hamed (yellow card) 42'; Bemammer (yellow card) 60'; Parthib (yellow card) 72'	Stadium: Jawaharlal Nehru Stadium; Attendance: 33,830; Referee: Harish Kundu; Man of the Match: Míchel Zabaco (NorthEast United)

27 October 2023 5	Kerala Blasters	2–1	Odisha	Kochi, Kerala
20:00 IST	Naocha (yellow card) 21'; Danish (yellow card) 45+3'; Diamantakos 66'; Luna 84', (yellow card) 90+7'	Report	Maurício 15', (yellow card) 63'; Jadhav (yellow card) 45+2'; Amrinder (yellow card) 67'; Jahouh (yellow card) 68'	Stadium: Jawaharlal Nehru Stadium; Attendance: 26,901; Referee: Senthil Nathan; Man of the Match: Adrián Luna (Kerala Blasters)

4 November 2023 6	East Bengal	1–2	Kerala Blasters	Kolkata, West Bengal
20:00 IST	Pardo (yellow card) 18'; Khabra (yellow card) 22'; Siverio (yellow card) 74'; Silva 90+9' (pen)	Report	Danish (yellow card) 13'; Kotal (yellow card) 24'; Sakai 32'; Ruivah (yellow card) 48'; Diamantakos 88', (yellow card) 87' (yellow-red card) 89'	Stadium: Vivekananda Yuba Bharati Krirangan; Attendance: 16,575; Referee: Ashwin Kumar; Man of the Match: Sachin Suresh (Kerala Blasters)

25 November 2023 7	Kerala Blasters	1–0	Hyderabad	Kochi, Kerala
20:00 IST	Drinčić (yellow card) 9', 41'; Danish (yellow card) 50'; Rahul (yellow card) 90+5'	Report	Pennanen (yellow card) 31'; Chinglensana (yellow card) 71'	Stadium: Jawaharlal Nehru Stadium; Attendance: 30,311; Referee: I Jamal Mohamed; Man of the Match: Miloš Drinčić (Kerala Blasters)

29 November 2023 8	Kerala Blasters	3–3	Chennaiyin	Kochi, Kerala
20:00 IST	Diamantakos 11' (pen.), 59'; Peprah 24'; Naocha (yellow card) 81'	Report	Ali 1'; Murray 13' (pen.), 24'	Stadium: Jawaharlal Nehru Stadium; Attendance: 22,715; Referee: Aditya Purkayastha; Man of the Match: Jordan Murray (Chennaiyin)

3 December 2023 9	Goa	1–0	Kerala Blasters	Margao, Goa
20:00 IST	Borges 45+1'; Onaindia (yellow card) 54'; Rodríguez (yellow card) 68'	Report	Naocha (yellow card) 45'; Vibin (yellow card) 90+1'; Danish (yellow card) 90+3'	Stadium: Fatorda Stadium; Attendance: 12,706; Referee: Senthil Nathan; Man of the Match: Sandesh Jhingan (Goa)

14 December 2023 10	Punjab	0–1	Kerala Blasters	New Delhi
20:00 IST	Prabhu (yellow card) 44'; Lhungdim (yellow card) 54'; Fernandes (yellow card) 87'	Report	Azhar (yellow card) 28'; Kotal (yellow card) 43'; Diamantakos 51' (pen.); Mandal (yellow card) 90+2'	Stadium: Jawaharlal Nehru Stadium; Attendance: 5,992; Referee: Rahul Gupta; Man of the Match: Mohammed Aimen (Kerala Blasters)

24 December 2023 11	Kerala Blasters	2–0	Mumbai City	Kochi, Kerala
20:00 IST	Diamantakos 11'; Peprah 45+5'; Rahul (yellow card) 76'; Danish (yellow card) 90+4'	Report		Stadium: Jawaharlal Nehru Stadium; Attendance: 34,981; Referee: Harish Kundu; Man of the Match: Kwame Peprah (Kerala Blasters)

27 December 2023 12	Mohun Bagan SG	0–1	Kerala Blasters	Kolkata, West Bengal
20:00 IST	Tangri (yellow card) 43'	Report	Diamantakos 9', (yellow card) 75'; Kotal (yellow card) 22'; Peprah (yellow card) 85'; Azhar (yellow card) 90'; Rahul (yellow card) 90+6'	Stadium: Vivekananda Yuba Bharati Krirangan; Attendance: 30,015; Referee: R Venkatesh; Man of the Match: Marko Lešković (Kerala Blasters)

2 February 2024 13	Odisha	2–1	Kerala Blasters	Bhubaneswar, Odisha
19:30 IST	Krishna 53', 57'; Rebello (yellow card) 79'; Ralte (yellow card) 80'; Gahlot (yellow card) 90+3'	Report	Diamantakos 19'; Danish (yellow card) 63'; Lešković (yellow card) 83'	Stadium: Kalinga Stadium; Attendance: TBC; Referee: Harish Kundu; Man of the Match: Roy Krishna (Odisha)

12 February 2024 14	Kerala Blasters	1–3	Punjab	Kochi, Kerala
19:30 IST	Drinčić (yellow card) 26', 39'; Lallawmawma (yellow card) 90+2'; Diamantakos (yellow card) 90+4'	Report	Jordán 42', 61'; Kumar (yellow card) 88'; Majcen 88' (pen.)	Stadium: Jawaharlal Nehru Stadium; Attendance: 17,650; Referee: I Jamal Mohamed; Man of the Match: Wilmar Jordán (Punjab)

16 February 2024 15	Chennaiyin	1–0	Kerala Blasters	Chennai, Tamil Nadu
19:30 IST	Sangwan (yellow card) 52', 60'; Ankit (yellow card) 54' (yellow-red card) 81'; Majumder (yellow card) 90+4'; Shields (yellow card) 90+7'	Report	Naocha (yellow card) 44'; Pandita (yellow card) 55'; Hormipam (yellow card) 80'; Černych (yellow card) 89'	Stadium: Jawaharlal Nehru Stadium; Attendance: TBC; Referee: TBC; Man of the Match: Aakash Sangwan (Chennaiyin)

25 February 2024 16	Kerala Blasters	4–2	Goa	Kochi, Kerala
19:30 IST	Sandeep (yellow card) 15'; Sakai 51'; Diamantakos 81' (pen.), 84', (yellow card) 84'; Drinčić (yellow card) 82'; Černych 88'	Report	Borges 7', (yellow card) 36'; Seriton (yellow card) 9'; Yasir 17'; Tamang (yellow card) 56'; McHugh (yellow card) 80'; Gupta (yellow card) 84'	Stadium: Jawaharlal Nehru Stadium; Attendance: 18,857; Referee: Pranjal Banerjee; Man of the Match: Dimitrios Diamantakos (Kerala Blasters)

2 March 2024 17	Bengaluru	1–0	Kerala Blasters	Bangalore, Karnataka
19:30 IST	Fanai (yellow card) 85'; Javi Hernández 89'; Chinglensana (yellow card) 90+4'	Report	Sandeep (yellow card) 34'; Naocha (yellow card) 59'; Hormipam (yellow card) 72'	Stadium: Sree Kanteerava Stadium; Attendance: 27,923; Referee: Ramachandran Venkatesh; Man of the Match: Javi Hernández (Bengaluru)

13 March 2024 18	Kerala Blasters	3–4	Mohun Bagan SG	Kochi, Kerala
19:30 IST	Mohanan 54'; Diamantakos 63', 90+9'	Report	Sadiku 4', 60'; Tangri 68'; Manvir (yellow card) 87'; Cummings 90+7'	Stadium: Jawaharlal Nehru Stadium; Attendance: 24,615; Referee: Harish Kundu; Man of the Match: Armando Sadiku (Mohun Bagan Super Giant)

30 March 2024 19	Jamshedpur	1–1	Kerala Blasters	Jamshedpur, Jharkhand
19:30 IST	Chaudhari (yellow card) 7'; Siverio 45'; Stevanović (yellow card) 90+4'	Report	Diamantakos 23'; Justine (yellow card) 30'; Lešković (yellow card) 52'; Danish (yellow card) 60'; Rahul (yellow card) 75'; Drinčić (yellow card) 81'	Stadium: JRD Tata Sports Complex; Attendance: 10,331; Referee: Pratik Mondal; Man of the Match: Javier Siverio (Jamshedpur)

3 April 2024 20	Kerala Blasters	2–4	East Bengal	Kochi, Kerala
19:30 IST	Ruivah (yellow card) 12'; Naocha (yellow card) 20', (red card) 74'; Černych 23'; Jeakson (yellow card) 29' (yellow-red card) 45'; Maher 84' (o.g.)	Report	Crespo 45+5' (pen.), 71'; Naorem 82', 87'	Stadium: Jawaharlal Nehru Stadium

6 April 2024 21	NorthEast United	2–0	Kerala Blasters	Guwahati, Assam
19:30 IST	Dinesh (yellow card) 63'; Albiach 84'; Jithin 90+1', (yellow card) 90+3'	Report	Mandal (yellow card) 48'	Stadium: Indira Gandhi Athletic Stadium; Attendance: 4,025; Referee: Rahul Gupta; Man of the Match: Néstor Albiach (NorthEast United)

12 April 2024 22	Hyderabad	1–3	Kerala Blasters	Hyderabad, Telangana
19:30 IST	Rafi (yellow card) 60'; Victor 88'; Saji (yellow card) 90+2'	Report	Aimen 34'; Ruivah (yellow card) 39'; Lešković (yellow card) 45+2'; Sakai 51'; Nihal 81'; Danish (yellow card) 90+2'	Stadium: G. M. C. Balayogi Athletic Stadium; Attendance: TBC; Referee: Tejas Nagvenkar; Man of the Match: Mohammed Aimen (Kerala Blasters)

===== Knockout stage =====
19 April 2024 Knockout play-offs	Odisha	2–1 (a.e.t.)	Kerala Blasters	Bhubaneswar, Odisha
19:30 IST	Delgado (yellow card) 76'; Maurício 87'; Isak 98'	Report	Drinčić (yellow card) 22'; Lara (yellow card) 29'; Lešković (yellow card) 42'; Černych 67'; Sandeep (yellow card) 102'	Stadium: Kalinga Stadium; Attendance: 7,431; Referee: Harish Kundu; Man of the Match: Ahmed Jahouh (Odisha)

=== Indian Super Cup ===
==== Group stage ====
The group stage draw for the 2024 Indian Super Cup was conducted on 18 December 2023 with the Blasters being drawn in Group B after the club was chosen from Pot 1.

Pos	Team	Pld	W	D	L	GF	GA	GD	Pts	Qualification	JAM	NEU	KER	SHL
1	Jamshedpur	3	3	0	0	7	3	+4	9	Advance to knockout stage	—	2–1	2–3	2–0
2	NorthEast United	3	2	0	1	7	4	+3	6		—	—	4–1	2–1
3	Kerala Blasters	3	1	0	2	6	8	−2	3		—	—	—	3–1
4	Shillong Lajong	3	0	0	3	2	7	−5	0		—	—	—	—

Source: AIFF
Rules for classification: 1) points; 2) head-to-head points; 3) head-to-head goal difference; 4) goal difference; 5) number of goals scored; 6) drawing of lots

==== Matches ====
Note: The group stage fixtures to the tournament was announced on 20 December 2023 by the AIFF.

10 January 2024 1	Kerala Blasters	3–1	Shillong Lajong	Bhubaneshwar, Odisha
14:00 IST	Peprah 15', 27'; Danish (yellow card) 24'; Aimen 46'; Sandeep (yellow card) 90+2'	Report	Wahlang (yellow card) 24'; Paulinho 29' (pen)	Stadium: Kalinga Stadium (Pitch 1); Attendance: 150; Referee: Mrutyunjay Lingaraj Amatya; Man of the Match: Kwame Peprah (Kerala Blasters)

15 January 2024 2	Kerala Blasters	2–3	Jamshedpur	Bhubaneshwar, Odisha
19:30 IST	Diamantakos 29' (pen), 62' (pen), (yellow card) 37'; Aimen (yellow card) 42'; Lešković (yellow card) 82'; Naocha (yellow card) 88'	Report	Elsinho (yellow card) 3'; Germanpreet (yellow card) 19'; Chukwu 33', 57', (red card) 90+4'; Chaudhari (yellow card) 50'; Lakra (yellow card) 63'; Jérémy Manzorro 69' (pen)	Stadium: Kalinga Stadium (Main Pitch); Attendance: 500; Referee: Ramachandran Venkatesh; Man of the Match: Daniel Chima Chukwu (Jamshedpur)

20 January 2024 3	Kerala Blasters	1–4	NorthEast United	Bhubaneshwar, Odisha
19:30 IST	Yoihenba (yellow card) 7'; Lešković (yellow card) 29'; Diamantakos (yellow card) 57', 70'; Sandeep (yellow card) 90+2'	Report	Gogoi 2', (yellow card) 8'; Philippoteaux (yellow card) 39'; Regragui (yellow card) 65'; Bemammer 68'; Tlang 75'; Jithin 79'	Stadium: Kalinga Stadium (Main Pitch); Attendance: 300; Referee: Ashwin Kanojia; Man of the Match: Mohammed Ali Bemammer (NorthEast United)

== Statistics ==
All stats are correct as of 1 May 2024

=== Squad appearances and goals ===
No.	Pos	Nat	Player	Total		Super League		Super Cup		Durand Cup	
No.	Pos	Nat	Player	Apps	Goals	Apps	Goals	Apps	Goals	Apps	Goals
Goalkeepers
1	GK	(India) IND	Karanjit Singh	7	0	5+2	0	0	0	0	0
23	GK	(India) IND	Lara Sharma	3	0	3	0	0	0	0	0
31	GK	(India) IND	Sachin Suresh	21	0	15	0	3	0	3	0
99	GK	(India) IND	Mohammed Arbaz	0	0	0	0	0	0	0	0
Defenders
3	DF	(India) IND	Sandeep Singh	18	0	10+5	0	1+2	0	0	0
4	DF	(India) IND	Ruivah Hormipam	17	0	12+1	0	2	0	1+1	0
15	DF	(Montenegro) MNE	Miloš Drinčić	22	2	19	2	2+1	0	0	0
20	DF	(India) IND	Pritam Kotal	22	0	15+4	0	0	0	3	0
27	DF	(India) IND	Aibanbha Dohling	3	0	3	0	0	0	0	0
33	DF	(India) IND	Prabir Das	13	1	5+3	0	1+1	0	3	1
50	DF	(India) IND	Naocha Singh	21	0	16	0	3	0	2	0
55	DF	(Croatia) CRO	Marko Lešković	14	0	9+3	0	2	0	0	0
66	DF	(India) IND	Aritra Das	2	0	0+2	0	0	0	0	0
Midfielders
5	MF	(India) IND	Jeakson Singh	12	0	8+2	0	0	0	1+1	0
6	MF	(India) IND	Freddy Lallawmawma	10	0	3+7	0	0	0	0	0
8	MF	(India) IND	Vibin Mohanan	21	1	16+3	1	0	0	2	0
10	MF	(Uruguay) URU	Adrián Luna	12	4	9+1	3	0	0	2	1
13	MF	(India) IND	Danish Farooq	26	3	16+4	2	3	0	2+1	1
17	MF	(India) IND	Saurav Mandal	11	0	3+5	0	0+1	0	1+1	0
22	MF	(India) IND	Yoihenba Meitei	5	0	0+2	0	1+1	0	1	0
25	MF	(India) IND	Korou Singh	2	0	0+1	0	0+1	0	0	0
32	MF	(India) IND	Mohammed Azhar	21	0	6+10	0	2+1	0	2	0
77	MF	(India) IND	Nihal Sudeesh	13	1	3+5	1	1+1	0	1+2	0
81	MF	(India) IND	Bryce Miranda	4	0	0	0	0+2	0	1+1	0
Forwards
7	MF	(India) IND	Rahul K. P.	21	0	10+9	0	0	0	1+1	0
9	FW	(Greece) GRE	Dimitrios Diamantakos	20	16	15+2	13	3	3	0	0
14	FW	(Ghana) GHA	Kwame Peprah	14	4	11+1	2	2	2	0	0
19	FW	(India) IND	Mohammed Aimen	27	4	13+8	1	2+1	1	2+1	2
21	FW	(Japan) JPN	Daisuke Sakai	24	3	17+4	3	3	0	0	0
24	FW	(Nigeria) NGR	Justine Emmanuel	9	2	1+5	0	0	0	2+1	2
26	FW	(India) IND	Ishan Pandita	17	0	3+12	0	0	0	1+1	0
30	FW	(India) IND	Bidyashagar Singh	6	3	0+1	0	1+2	0	1+1	3
91	FW	(Lithuania) LTU	Fedor Černych	10	3	8+2	3	0	0	0	0
Players with appearances that left the club on loan
2	DF	(India) IND	Muhammed Saheef	3	0	0	0	0	0	1+2	0
21	DF	(India) IND	Bijoy Varghese	2	0	0	0	0	0	2	0
Unregistered players
11	FW	(Australia) AUS	Jaushua Sotirio	0	0	0	0	0	0	0	0

=== Goalscorers ===
Rank	Nation	Name	No.	Position(s)	Played	League	Super Cup	Durand Cup	Total	Per game	Goal %
1	(Greece)	Dimitrios Diamantakos	9	ST	20	13	3	–	16	0.80	80%
2	(Uruguay)	Adrián Luna	10	AM/LW/CM/CF	12	3	–	1	4	0.33	33.33%
2	(Ghana)	Kwame Peprah	14	ST	14	2	2	–	4	0.28	28.57%
2	(India)	Mohammed Aimen	19	CF/LW	27	1	1	2	4	0.14	14.81%
5	(India)	Bidyashagar Singh	30	CF	6	–	–	3	3	0.50	50%
5	(Lithuania)	Fedor Černych	91	RW/LW/SS	10	3	–	–	3	0.30	30%
5	(Japan)	Daisuke Sakai	21	RW/LW/AM	24	3	–	–	3	0.12	12.5%
5	(India)	Danish Farooq Bhat	13	LM	26	2	–	1	3	0.11	11.54%
9	(Nigeria)	Justine Emmanuel	24	RW	9	–	–	2	2	0.22	22.22%
9	(Montenegro)	Miloš Drinčić	15	CB/LB	22	2	–	–	2	0.09	9.09%
11	(India)	Prabir Das	33	RB	13	–	–	1	1	0.07	7.69%
11	(India)	Nihal Sudeesh	77	RW	13	1	–	–	1	0.07	7.69%
11	(India)	Vibin Mohanan	8	CM	21	1	–	–	1	0.04	4.76%
Own Goals Received (Note: Scored by the opposition team.)						2	–	–	2		
Total						33	6	10	49		

=== Hat-tricks ===
Rank	Nation	Name	No.	Position	Against	Result	Date	Competition	Refs.
1	(India)	Bidyashagar Singh	30	CF	(India) Indian Air Force	5–0 (N)	21 August 2023	Durand Cup	

=== Assist ===
Rank	Nation	Name	No.	Position(s)	Played	League	Super Cup	Durand Cup	Total	Per game	Assist %
1	(Uruguay)	Adrián Luna	10	AM/LW/CM/CF	12	4	–	1	5	0.41	41.67%
2	(Greece)	Dimitrios Diamantakos	9	ST	20	3	1	–	4	0.20	20%
3	(India)	Saurav Mandal	11	RM/RW	11	2	–	1	3	0.27	27.27%
3	(India)	Vibin Mohanan	8	CM	21	–	–	3	3	0.14	14.29%
3	(India)	Mohammed Aimen	19	CF/LW	27	2	–	1	3	0.11	11.11%
6	(Japan)	Daisuke Sakai	21	RW/LW/AM	24	1	1	–	2	0.08	8.33%
6	(India)	Danish Farooq Bhat	13	LM	26	1	–	1	2	0.07	7.69%
8	(India)	Bidyashagar Singh	30	CF	6	–	–	1	1	0.16	16.67%
8	(Nigeria)	Justine Emmanuel	24	RW	9	1	–	–	1	0.11	11.11%
8	(Lithuania)	Fedor Černych	91	RW/LW/SS	10	1	–	–	1	0.10	10%
8	(India)	Prabir Das	33	RB	12	–	1	–	1	0.09	8.33%
8	(India)	Nihal Sudeesh	77	RW	13	1	–	–	1	0.07	7.69%
8	(Ghana)	Kwame Peprah	14	ST	14	1	–	–	1	0.07	7.14%
8	(India)	Rahul K. P.	7	RW/CF	21	1	–	–	1	0.04	4.76%
Total						18	3	8	29		

=== Goal contributions ===
Note: The following table ranks the players based on their goal contributions during the campaign.

Rank	Nation	Player	Position(s)	Goals	Assists	Total
1	(Greece)	Dimitrios Diamantakos	ST	16	4	20
2	(Uruguay)	Adrián Luna	AM/LW/CM/CF	4	5	9
3	(India)	Mohammed Aimen	CF/LW	4	3	7
4	(India)	Danish Farooq Bhat	LM	3	2	5
4	(Ghana)	Kwame Peprah	ST	4	1	5
4	(Japan)	Daisuke Sakai	RW/LW/AM	3	2	5
7	(Lithuania)	Fedor Černych	RW/LW/SS	3	1	4
7	(India)	Bidyashagar Singh	CF	3	1	4
7	(India)	Vibin Mohanan	CM	1	3	4
10	(Nigeria)	Justine Emmanuel	RW	2	1	3
10	(India)	Saurav Mandal	RM/RW	0	3	3
12	(India)	Prabir Das	RB	1	1	2
12	(Montenegro)	Miloš Drinčić	CB/LB	2	0	2
12	(India)	Nihal Sudeesh	RW	1	1	2
15	(India)	Rahul K. P.	RW/CF	0	1	1

=== Clean-sheets ===
Rank	Nation	Name	No.	League	Super Cup	Durand Cup	Total
1	(India)	Sachin Suresh	31	5	–	1	6

=== Disciplinary record ===
No.	Position(s)	Nat.	Name	League			Super Cup			Durand Cup			Total		
No.	Position(s)	Nat.	Name	Yellow card	Second yellow card	Red card	Yellow card	Second yellow card	Red card	Yellow card	Second yellow card	Red card	Yellow card	Second yellow card	Red card
10	AM/LW/CM/CF	(Uruguay)	Adrián Luna	3	0	0	0	0	0	1	0	0	4	0	0
5	CDM	(India)	Jeakson Singh	2	1	0	0	0	0	0	0	0	2	1	0
27	LB/CB	(India)	Aibanbha Dohling	1	0	0	0	0	0	0	0	0	1	0	0
19	CF/LW	(India)	Mohammed Aimen	1	0	0	1	0	0	1	0	0	3	0	0
4	CB	(India)	Hormipam Ruivah	5	0	0	0	0	0	0	1	0	5	1	0
11	RM/RW	(India)	Saurav Mandal	2	0	0	0	0	0	1	0	0	3	0	0
33	RB	(India)	Prabir Das	1	0	0	0	0	0	0	0	0	1	0	0
11	CB/LB	(Montenegro)	Miloš Drinčić	5	0	1	0	0	0	0	0	0	5	0	1
3	RB/CB/LB	(India)	Sandeep Singh	4	0	0	2	0	0	0	0	0	6	0	0
6	CDM	(India)	Freddy Lallawmawma	2	0	0	0	0	0	0	0	0	2	0	0
7	RW/CF	(India)	Rahul K. P.	4	0	0	0	0	0	0	0	0	4	0	0
50	LB	(India)	Naocha Singh	5	0	1	1	0	0	0	0	0	6	0	1
13	LM	(India)	Danish Farooq Bhat	8	0	0	1	0	0	0	0	0	9	0	0
9	ST	(Greece)	Dimitrios Diamantakos	3	1	0	2	0	0	0	0	0	5	1	0
20	CB/RB	(India)	Pritam Kotal	3	0	0	0	0	0	0	0	0	3	0	0
8	CM	(India)	Vibin Mohanan	1	0	0	0	0	0	0	0	0	1	0	0
32	CM	(India)	Mohammed Azhar	3	0	0	0	0	0	0	0	0	3	0	0
14	ST	(Ghana)	Kwame Peprah	1	0	0	0	0	0	0	0	0	1	0	0
55	CB	(Croatia)	Marko Lešković	4	0	0	2	0	0	0	0	0	6	0	0
22	CM	(India)	Yoihenba Meitei	0	0	0	1	0	0	0	0	0	1	0	0
91	RW/LW/CF	(Lithuania)	Fedor Černych	1	0	0	0	0	0	0	0	0	1	0	0
26	ST	(India)	Ishan Pandita	1	0	0	0	0	0	0	0	0	1	0	0
24	RW	(Nigeria)	Justine Emmanuel	1	0	0	0	0	0	0	0	0	1	0	0
23	GK	(India)	Lara Sharma	1	0	0	0	0	0	0	0	0	1	0	0
Total				62	2	2	10	0	0	3	1	0	75	3	2

=== Suspensions ===
Note: This table includes all suspensions that were concluded during this season.

Suspension Date	Name	For	Total Matches	Return Date	Refs.
2022–23 season	(Serbia) Ivan Vukomanović	Suspended for ten games by the AIFF due to the 'walk-off' from the knockout stage match from the previous season (Vukomanović would spend the last seven matches of his suspension during this season).	10 matches	27 October 2023	
8 October 2023	(Montenegro) Miloš Drinčić	Suspended for three games by the AIFF following a red card against Mumbai City FC.	3 matches	25 November 2023	
8 October 2023	(India) Prabir Das	Suspended for three games by the AIFF for protesting against the referee during the match against Mumbai City FC.	3 matches	25 November 2023	
3 December 2023	(India) Danish Farooq Bhat	Suspended for one game due to the accumulation of four yellow cards.	1 match	24 December 2023	
11 December 2023	(Serbia) Ivan Vukomanović	Suspended for one game by the AIFF due to his comments against the referees during a post-match press conference.	1 match	24 December 2023	
27 December 2023	(India) Rahul K. P.	Suspended for one game due to the accumulation of four yellow cards.	1 match	12 February 2024	
2 March 2024	(India) Naocha Singh	Suspended for one game due to the accumulation of four yellow cards.	1 match	30 March 2024	
30 March 2024	(Montenegro) Miloš Drinčić	Suspended for one game due to the accumulation of four yellow cards.	1 match	6 April 2024	
30 March 2024	(India) Danish Farooq Bhat	Suspended for one game due to the accumulation of seven yellow cards.	1 match	6 April 2024	
3 April 2024	(India) Hormipam Ruivah	Suspended for one game due to the accumulation of four yellow cards.	1 match	12 April 2024	
3 April 2024	(India) Jeakson Singh	Suspended for one game following a second yellow against East Bengal FC, along with a fine of Indian rupees 20,000.	1 match	12 April 2024	
3 April 2024	(India) Naocha Singh	Suspended for two games following a red card against East Bengal FC.	3 match	2024–25 season	
19 April 2024	(Croatia) Marko Lešković	Suspended for one game due to the accumulation of four yellow cards.	1 match	Left the club next season before serving the suspension	
19 April 2024	(India) Sandeep Singh	Suspended for one game due to the accumulation of four yellow cards.	1 match	2024–25 season	

=== Matchday Statistics ===
==== Indian Super League ====
S.No.	Matchday No.	Date	Against	Shots on Goal	Shot Attempts	Fouls	Yellow Cards	Red Cards	Corner Kicks	Saves	Refs.
1	Matchday 1	21 September 2023	Bengaluru FC	5	9	7	1	0	5	4	
2	Matchday 2	1 October 2023	Jamshedpur FC	3	9	11	2	0	1	3	
3	Matchday 3	8 October 2023	Mumbai City FC	4	11	9	5	1	9	2	
4	Matchday 4	21 October 2023	NorthEast United FC	1	13	7	1	0	8	0	
5	Matchday 5	27 October 2023	Odisha FC	4	18	13	3	0	7	4	
6	Matchday 6	4 November 2023	East Bengal FC	3	10	19	3	1	5	3	
7	Matchday 7	25 November 2023	Hyderabad FC	2	11	13	3	0	8	3	
8	Matchday 8	29 November 2023	Chennaiyin FC	5	15	15	1	0	5	1	
9	Matchday 9	3 December 2023	FC Goa	3	10	9	3	0	9	3	
10	Matchday 10	14 December 2023	Punjab FC	3	14	12	3	0	4	0	
11	Matchday 11	24 December 2023	Mumbai City FC	3	10	14	2	0	2	1	
12	Matchday 12	27 December 2023	Mohun Bagan Super Giant	5	16	12	5	0	8	2	
13	Matchday 13	2 February 2024	Odisha FC	6	8	10	2	0	7	4	
14	Matchday 14	12 February 2024	Punjab FC	3	11	10	3	0	6	3	
15	Matchday 15	16 February 2024	Chennaiyin FC	2	8	10	4	0	4	3	
16	Matchday 16	25 February 2024	FC Goa	7	14	15	3	0	6	1	
17	Matchday 17	2 March 2024	Bengaluru FC	1	5	12	3	0	4	1	
18	Matchday 18	13 March 2024	Mohun Bagan Super Giant	5	9	9	0	0	3	3	
19	Matchday 19	30 March 2024	Jamshedpur FC	3	20	16	5	0	3	2	
20	Matchday 20	3 April 2024	East Bengal FC	4	8	7	2	2	2	4	
21	Matchday 21	6 April 2024	NorthEast United FC	3	14	7	1	0	6	3	
22	Matchday 22	12 April 2024	Hyderabad FC	6	14	12	3	0	10	6	
23	Knockout play-off	19 April 2024	Odisha FC	6	17	11	4	0	7	3	
Total				87	274	260	62	4	129	59	

==== Indian Super Cup ====
S.No.	Matchday No.	Date	Against	Shots on Goal	Shot Attempts	Fouls	Yellow Cards	Red Cards	Corner Kicks	Saves	Refs.
1	Matchday 2	10 January 2024	Shillong Lajong FC	3	10	4	2	0	4	1	
2	Matchday 6	15 January 2024	Jamshedpur FC	7	13	6	4	0	1	3	
3	Matchday 10	20 January 2024	NorthEast United FC	2	8	8	4	0	6	2	
Total				12	31	18	10	0	11	6	

==== Durand Cup ====
S.No.	Matchday No.	Date	Against	Shots on Goal	Shot Attempts	Fouls	Yellow Cards	Red Cards	Corner Kicks	Refs.
1	Matchday 11	13 August 2023	Gokulam Kerala FC	5	16	2	2	0	4	
2	Matchday 15	18 August 2023	Bengaluru FC	5	16	2	1	1	12	
3	Matchday 18	21 August 2023	Indian Air Force	12	23	1	1	0	9	
Total				22	55	5	4	1	25	

=== International call-ups ===
Note: The following table consists of the Blasters' players (excluding the players who departed the club permanently or on loan) who were called-up for their countries' senior and junior squads for the international fixtures during the season.

National team	Player	Pos.	Debut	Caps	Goals	Latest call-up	Tournament	Refs.
India U17	(India) Korou Singh	CM	5 September 2022	2	0	1 September 2023	2022 SAFF U-17 Championship; International friendlies	
India U23	(India) Hormipam Ruivah	CB	22 March 2024	0	0	14 March 2024	2024 AFC U-23 Asian Cup Qualifiers; International friendlies	
India U23	(India) Vibin Mohanan	CM	9 September 2023	2	0	14 March 2024	2024 AFC U-23 Asian Cup Qualifiers; International friendlies	
India	(India) Jeakson Singh	CDM	25 March 2021	17	0	15 March 2024	2023 Merdeka Cup; 2026 FIFA World Cup Qualifiers	
Lithuania	(Lithuania) Fedor Černych (Note: Černych was not contracted with the Blasters during the Euro qualifiers' call-up and has been added to the list on the basis of being called-up for national team during the 2023–24 calendar year and then later signing for the Blasters during the winter transfer-window.)	RW/LW/SS	14 November 2012	89	14	13 March 2024	International friendlies UEFA Euro 2024 Qualifiers; 2022–23 UEFA Nations League C Play-Offs	
India	(India) Pritam Kotal	CB/RB	12 March 2015	49	0	30 December 2023	2023 Intercontinental Cup; 2023 SAFF Championship; 2023 AFC Asian Cup	
India	(India) Rahul K. P.	RW/CF	24 September 2022	6	0	30 December 2023	2023 King's Cup; 2023 AFC Asian Cup	
India	(India) Ishan Pandita	CF	25 March 2021	7	1	30 December 2023	2023 AFC Asian Cup	
India U23	(India) Mohammed Aimen	CF/LW	22 March 2024	0	0	14 March 2024	International friendlies	
Reserves
India U20	(India) Ebindas Yesudasan	CM	30 September 2023	0	0	8 September 2023	2023 SAFF U-19 Championship	

=== Injury record ===
No.	Pos.	Nat.	Name	Type	Status	Source	Match	Inj. Date	Ret. Date
11	FW	(Australia)	Jaushua Sotirio	Achilles tendon rupture		KBFC.in	in pre-season camp	16 July 2023	2024–25 season
9	FW	(Greece)	Dimitrios Diamantakos	Unknown injury		ISL.com	in pre-season camp	1 September 2023	1 October 2023
55	DF	(Croatia)	Marko Lešković	Muscle injury		SAMAYAM.com	vs Sharjah FC in a pre-season friendly game	12 September 2023	25 November 2023
27	DF	(India)	Aibanbha Dohling	ACL tear		ISL.com	vs Mumbai City FC	8 October 2023	2024–25 season
5	MF	(India)	Jeakson Singh	Shoulder injury		BRIDGE.in	vs Mumbai City FC	8 October 2023	10 January 2024
6	MF	(India)	Freddy Lallawmawma	Shoulder and jaw bone injury		KBFC.in	in a bike accident during international breaks	9 November 2023	12 February 2024
10	MF	(Uruguay)	Adrián Luna	Chondral knee injury		KBFC.in	in training	12 December 2023	19 April 2024
8	MF	(India)	Vibin Mohanan	Unknown injury		SAMAYAM.com	vs Mumbai City FC	24 December 2023	25 February 2024
14	FW	(Ghana)	Kwame Peprah	Groin injury		BRIDGE.in	vs Jamshedpur FC in the Indian Super Cup	15 January 2024	2024–25 season
31	GK	(India)	Sachin Suresh	Shoulder injury		KBFC (X.COM)	vs Chennaiyin FC	16 February 2024	2024–25 season
9	FW	(Greece)	Dimitrios Diamantakos	Unknown injury		ISL.com	vs East Bengal FC	3 April 2024	2024–25 season (left the club next season)
24	FW	(Nigeria)	Justine Emmanuel	Unknown injury		MANORAMA.com	vs East Bengal FC	3 April 2024	2024–25 season
23	GK	(India)	Lara Sharma	Unknown injury		MANORAMA.com	vs Odisha FC	19 April 2024	2024–25 season (left the club next season)

- Player is injured
- Player has recovered from injury
Last updated: 31 May 2024
Source: Kerala Blasters FC

== Seasonal awards ==
=== Indian Super League ===
- 2023–24 Indian Super League Golden Boot: Dimitrios Diamantakos

== Club awards ==
The Indian Super Cup Player of the Match awards is awarded after each matchday to the players by the Super Cup based on their performances on that day.

Matchday No.	Nat.	Player	Opponents	Date	Refs.
Matchday 2	(Ghana)	Kwame Peprah (1)	Shillong Lajong FC	10 January 2024	

The Durand Cup Player of the Match award is awarded after each matchday to the players by the Durand Cup based on their performances on that day.

Matchday No.	Nat.	Player	Opponents	Date	Refs.
Matchday 18	(India)	Bidyashagar Singh (1)	Indian Air Force	21 August 2023	

== Milestones ==
Keys
Final score	The score at full time; Blasters' listed first.	No.	Squad number	Pos.	Position
Opponent	The opponent team without a flag is English.	(N)	The game was played at a neutral site.		
(H)	The Blasters were the home team.	(A)	The Blasters were the away team.		
Player^{*}	Player who joined the Blasters permanently or on loan during the season				
Player^{†}	Player who departed the Blasters permanently or on loan during the season				
Player^{#}	Player from the Blasters's reserve's squad				

=== Players ===
==== Debuts ====
Note: The following players made their competitive debuts for the Blasters' first team during the campaign.

As of 6 April 2024

Date	No.	Pos.	Player	Final score	Opponent	Competition	Refs.
13 August 2023	20	CB/RB	(India) Pritam Kotal	3–4 (N)	Gokulam Kerala FC	Durand Cup	
13 August 2023	33	RB	(India) Prabir Das	3–4 (N)	Gokulam Kerala FC	Durand Cup	
13 August 2023	50	LB	(India) Naocha Singh*	3–4 (N)	Gokulam Kerala FC	Durand Cup	
13 August 2023	24	RW	(Nigeria) Justine Emmanuel^{†}	3–4 (N)	Gokulam Kerala FC	Durand Cup	
18 August 2023	26	CF	(India) Ishan Pandita	1–1 (N)	Bengaluru FC II	Durand Cup	
21 September 2023	27	LB/CB	(India) Aibanbha Dohling	2–1 (H)	Bengaluru FC	Indian Super League	
21 September 2023	6	CDM	(India) Freddy Lallawmawma	2–1 (H)	Bengaluru FC	Indian Super League	
21 September 2023	14	ST	(Ghana) Kwame Peprah	2–1 (H)	Bengaluru FC	Indian Super League	
21 September 2023	21	RW/LW/AM	(Japan) Daisuke Sakai	2–1 (H)	Bengaluru FC	Indian Super League	
27 December 2023	22	CM	(India) Yoihenba Meitei^{#}	0–1 (A)	Mohun Bagan Super Giant	Indian Super League	
20 January 2024	25	CM	(India) Korou Singh^{#}	1–4 (N)	Indian Super Cup	Indian Super Cup	
2 February 2024	91	RW/LW/CF	(Lithuania) Fedor Černych	2–1 (A)	Odisha FC	Indian Super League	
3 April 2024	66	LB/LM	(India) Aritra Das^{#}	2–4 (H)	East Bengal FC	Indian Super League	
6 April 2024	23	GK	(India) Lara Sharma	2–0 (H)	NorthEast United FC	Indian Super League	

==== 50th appearances ====
Note: The following players made their 50th appearances for the Blasters' first team during the campaign.

As of 31 March 2024

Date	No.	Pos.	Player	Final score	Opponent	Competition	Refs.
8 October 2023	10	AM/LW/CM/CF	(Uruguay) Adrián Luna	2–1 (A)	Mumbai City FC	Indian Super League	
20 January 2024	3	RB/CB/ LB	(India) Sandeep Singh	1–4 (N)	Indian Super Cup	Indian Super League	
25 February 2024	4	CB	(India) Hormipam Ruivah	4–2 (H)	FC Goa	Indian Super League	
30 March 2024	55	CB	(Croatia) Marko Lešković	1–1 (H)	Jamshedpur FC	Indian Super League	

==== First goals ====
Note: The following players scored their first goals for the Blasters first team during the campaign.

As of 30 March 2024

Date	No.	Pos.	Player	Final score	Opponent	Competition	Refs.
13 August 2023	24	RW	(Nigeria) Justine Emmanuel^{†}	3–4 (N)	Gokulam Kerala FC	Durand Cup	
13 August 2023	33	RB	(India) Prabir Das	3–4 (N)	Gokulam Kerala FC	Durand Cup	
21 August 2023	22	CM	(India) Bidyashagar Singh	5–0 (N)	Indian Airforce	Durand Cup	
21 August 2023	13	LM	(India) Danish Farooq Bhat	5–0 (N)	Indian Airforce	Durand Cup	
4 November 2023	21	RW/LW/AM	(Japan) Daisuke Sakai	1–2 (A)	East Bengal FC	Indian Super League	
25 November 2023	15	CB/LB	(Montenegro) Miloš Drinčić	1–0 (H)	Hyderabad FC	Indian Super League	
29 November 2023	14	ST	(Ghana) Kwame Peprah	3–3 (H)	Chennaiyin FC	Indian Super League	
25 February 2024	91	RW/LW/CF	(Lithuania) Fedor Černych	4–2 (H)	FC Goa	Indian Super League	
13 March 2024	8	CM	(India) Vibin Mohanan	3–4 (H)	Mohun Bagan Super Giant	Indian Super League	
12 April 2024	77	RW	(India) Nihal Sudeesh	1–3 (A)	Hyderabad FC	Indian Super League	

==== First assists ====
Note: The following players registered their first assists for the Blasters' first team during the campaign.

As of 30 March 2024

Date	No.	Pos.	Player	Final score	Opponent	Competition	Refs.
21 August 2023	17	RM/RW	(India) Saurav Mandal	5–0 (N)	Indian Airforce	Durand Cup	
21 August 2023	13	LM	(India) Danish Farooq Bhat	5–0 (N)	Indian Airforce	Durand Cup	
21 August 2023	8	CM	(India) Vibin Mohanan	5–0 (N)	Indian Airforce	Durand Cup	
27 October 2023	21	RW/LW/AM	(Japan) Daisuke Sakai	2–1 (H)	Odisha FC	Indian Super League	
13 August 2023	22	CM	(India) Bidyashagar Singh	3–4 (N)	Gokulam Kerala FC	Durand Cup	
24 December 2023	14	ST	(Ghana) Kwame Peprah	2–0 (H)	Mumbai City FC	Indian Super League	
10 January 2024	33	RB	(India) Prabir Das	3–1 (N)	Shillong Lajong FC	Indian Super Cup	
2 February 2024	77	RW	(India) Nihal Sudeesh	2–1 (A)	Odisha FC	Indian Super League	
13 March 2024	91	RW/LW/CF	(Lithuania) Fedor Černych	3–4 (H)	Mohun Bagan Super Giant	Indian Super League	
13 March 2024	24	RW	(Nigeria) Justine Emmanuel^{†}	3–4 (H)	Mohun Bagan Super Giant	Indian Super League	

==== First starts as captain ====
Note: The following players made their first starts as captain of the Blasters first team during the campaign.

As of 6 April 2024

Date	No.	Pos.	Player	Final score	Opponent	Competition	Refs.
13 August 2023	10	AM/LW/CM/CF	(Uruguay) Adrián Luna	3–4 (N)	Gokulam Kerala FC	Durand Cup	
21 August 2023	20	RB	(India) Pritam Kotal	5–0 (N)	Indian Air Force	Durand Cup	
14 December 2023	55	CB	(Croatia) Marko Lešković	0–1 (A)	Punjab FC	Indian Super League	
10 January 2024	9	ST	(Greece) Dimitrios Diamantakos	3–1 (N)	Shillong Lajong FC	Indian Super Cup	
6 April 2024	15	CB/LB	(Montenegro) Miloš Drinčić	2–0 (H)	NorthEast United FC	Indian Super League	

=== Historical ===
The following table lists the historical achievements of the Blasters' players during the season.

Player	Event	Date	Match	Tournament	Refs.
(Uruguay) Adrián Luna	Became the first foreign player to play 50 matches for the club.	8 October 2023	Mumbai City FC	Indian Super League	
(Greece) Dimitrios Diamantakos	Became the top goal-scorer in the history of the club after surpassing the former tally of 15 goals set by Luna and Bartholomew Ogbeche.	29 November 2023	Chennaiyin FC	Indian Super League	
(Greece) Dimitrios Diamantakos	Became the first Kerala Blasters player to win the Indian Super League Golden Boot.	4 May 2024	Season Awards	Indian Super League	

== See also ==
- Kerala Blasters FC
- List of Kerala Blasters FC seasons
- Indian Super League
- 2023–24 Indian Super League season
