= Freddy Lallawmawma =

Indian footballer (born 2002)

Personal information
- Date of birth: 27 July 2002 (age 24)
- Place of birth: Mizoram, India
- Position: Defensive midfielder

Team information
- Current team: Kerala Blasters
- Number: 6

Senior career*
Years	Team	Apps	(Gls)
2021–2023	Punjab	35	(1)
2023–	Kerala Blasters	39	(1)
- * Club domestic league appearances and goals as of 18 October 2026

Freddy Lallawmawma (born 27 July 2002) is an Indian professional footballer who plays as a midfielder for the Indian Super League club Kerala Blasters.

== Club career ==
=== Punjab FC ===
Lallawmawma joined I-League club Roundglass Punjab in 2021. In his debut season with the club, he made total ten appearances for the club in the league. In the following 2022-23 season, he became an integral part of the club, making a total of 22 appearances for them in both the league and Super Cup. He won the 2022-23 I league with Punjab, helping them to earn promotion into Indian Super League.

=== Kerala Blasters ===
On 31 August 2023, Indian Super League club Kerala Blasters announced the signing of Lallawmawma from Punjab for an undisclosed transfer fee on a three-year deal until 2026. He made his debut for the club on 21 September in the season opener against Bengaluru FC at home, by coming as a substitute in the 79th minute, which the Blasters won 2–1. On 11 November, Lallawmawma met with a bike accident and suffered a serious shoulder and jaw bone injury. He came back from injury on 12 February 2024 in a 1–3 loss against Punjab FC, by coming as a substitute in the 92nd minute. On 7 September, Kerala Blasters announced that Freddy has signed a new contract with the club, which would keep him until 2027 with an option to extend.

== Career statistics ==
=== Club ===
As of match played 18 October 2026

Appearances and goals by club, season and competition
Club	Season	League			National cup (Note: Includes AIFF Super Cup)		Continental		Others		Total	
Club	Season	Division	Apps	Goals	Apps	Goals	Apps	Goals	Apps	Goals	Apps	Goals
RoundGlass Punjab	2021–22	I-League	16	1	—		—		—		16	1
RoundGlass Punjab	2022–23	I-League	19	0	3	0	—		—		22	0
RoundGlass Punjab	Total		35	1	3	0	0	0	0	0	38	1
Kerala Blasters	2023–24	Indian Super League	10	0	0	0	—		0	0	10	0
Kerala Blasters	2024–25	Indian Super League	17	1	1	0	—		4 (Note: Appearances in Durand Cup)	0	22	1
Kerala Blasters	2025–26	Indian Super League	8	0	2	0	—		—		10	0
Kerala Blasters	2026–27	Indian Super League	2	0	0	0	—		—		1	0
Kerala Blasters	Total		37	1	3	0	0	0	4	0	44	1
Career total			72	2	6	0	0	0	4	0	82	2

== Honours ==
RoundGlass Punjab

- I-League: 2022–23
