= Mohammed Azhar =

Indian football player

Personal information
- Date of birth: 20 January 2003 (age 23)
- Place of birth: Lakshadweep, India
- Height: 1.73 m (5 ft 8 in)
- Positions: Central midfielder; defensive midfielder; right-back

Team information
- Current team: SC Delhi

Youth career
- Don Bosco FA
- 2018–2022: Kerala Blasters

Senior career*
Years	Team	Apps	(Gls)
2022–2023	Kerala Blasters B	7	(0)
2022–2026	Kerala Blasters	22	(0)
2026–	SC Delhi	6	(0)
- * Club domestic league appearances and goals as of 15:44, 30 January 2025 (UTC)

Mohammed Azhar (born 20 January 2003) is an Indian professional footballer who plays as a midfielder for Indian Super League club SC Delhi. He is the twin brother of Mohammed Aimen.

== Club career ==
=== Kerala Blasters ===
==== Youth and early career ====
Azhar joined the Kerala Blasters Academy in 2018 at the age of fifteen, along with his twin brother Aimen, after a short spell in the Don Bosco football academy. The twins had moved to Kerala from Lakshadweep for their schooling and attended the Kerala Blasters U-15 trials, getting selected in the process. Azhar came up through the ranks along with his brother and played for the under-15 and under-18 teams of Kerala Blasters. He eventually played for the Kerala Blasters in the 2022 RFDL. He played 3 games in the tournament, which was held from 2022 April to May, where the team emerged as the runners-up and qualified for the Next Gen Cup. Azhar then played for the side in the Next Gen Cup held in United Kingdom in July 2022.

==== 2022–2023: Rise to the first team ====
In August 2022, with the first team preparing for the 2022–23 Indian Super League season in UAE, Kerala Blasters fielded their reserves for the 2022 Durand Cup, where Azhar was included in the squad. He played the entire 90 minutes in all the five games and made two assists, which includes one to his own brother in the competition. Azhar was then promoted to the club's senior team ahead of the 2022–23 season along with Aimen, to train with the first team on a developmental role during the 2022–23 Indian Super League season. During the season, he played for the reserve team in the 2022–23 Kerala Premier League and the 2023 RFDL. In November 2022, the twins were sent to Poland for a three-week training stint with the Polish top-tier club Rakow Czestochowa.

In April 2023, Azhar was included in the Kerala Blasters squad for the 2023 Super Cup. He was in the match-day squad for the group stage match against Bengaluru FC on 16 April, where he remained in the bench as an unused substitute.

==== 2023–2024: Contract extension and league debut ====
On 9 May 2023, Kerala Blasters announced that Azhar has signed a three-year contract extension with the club, that would keep him with them until 2026. He finally made his official debut for the Blasters senior team on 13 August 2023 in the first group match of 2023 Durand Cup against Gokulam Kerala, which the Blasters lost 3–4, where he played for the entire 90 minutes in the central midfield position. Azhar played one more game in the tournament on 21 August against Indian Air Force, where he played majority of the time as a right back.

On 27 October, Azhar made his debut for the club in the Indian Super League against Odisha FC in a 2–1 win at home, by coming as a substitute in the 79th minute. He was included in the Blasters' starting eleven during a league game for the first time against Punjab FC on 14 December, which the Blasters won 1–0, where he played for the entire 90 minutes.

==== 2024–present ====
Azhar was named one among the Blasters' players to take part in the 2024 Durand Cup tournament. He would score his senior debut goal on 10 August against CISF Protectors, where he scored the sixth of the night for the Blasters, as they won the match 7–0 at full-time.

== Personal life ==
Azhar's twin brother Aimen is also a professional footballer; both twins joined Kerala Blasters academy at the same time in 2018. Born in Lakshadweep, the twins later grew up in Kochi, Kerala, as their father worked at the Lakshadweep Communication in Kochi.

== Career statistics ==
=== Club ===
As of matches played 30 January 2025

Club	Season	League			Cup (Note: Includes Super Cup)		Continental		Other (Note: includes Durand Cup)		Total	
Club	Season	Division	Apps	Goals	Apps	Goals	Apps	Goals	Apps	Goals	Apps	Goals
Kerala Blasters B	2022	RFDL	3	0	—		—		—		3	0
Kerala Blasters B	2023	RFDL	4	0	—		—		—		4	0
Kerala Blasters B	Total		7	0	0	0	0	0	0	0	7	0
Kerala Blasters	2022–23	Indian Super League	0	0	0	0	—		5	0	5	0
Kerala Blasters	2023–24	Indian Super League	16	0	3	0	—		2	0	21	0
Kerala Blasters	2024–25	Indian Super League	6	0	1	0	—		3	1	10	1
Kerala Blasters	Total		22	0	4	0	0	0	10	1	36	1
SC Delhi	2025–26	Indian Super League	0	0	0	0	—		0	0	0	0
Career total			29	0	4	0	0	0	10	1	43	1
