= Miloš Drinčić =

Montenegrin footballer

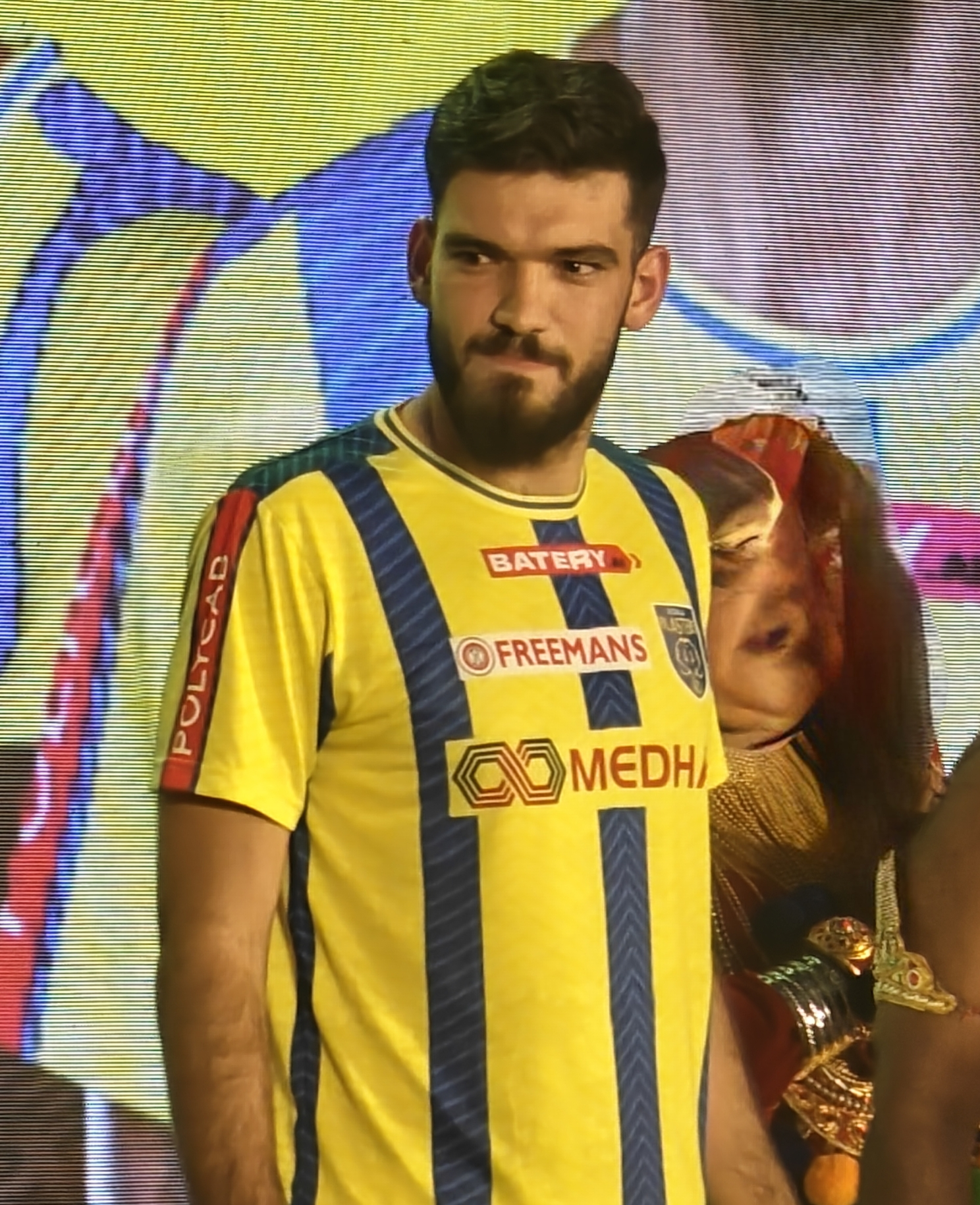
- Miloš in 2024 with Kerala Blasters

Personal information
- Date of birth: 14 February 1999 (age 27)
- Place of birth: Podgorica, Montenegro, FR Yugoslavia
- Height: 1.95 m (6 ft 5 in)
- Position: Centre-back

Team information
- Current team: Hougang United
- Number: 15

Youth career
- 2015–2016: Budućnost

Senior career*
Years	Team	Apps	(Gls)
2016–2021	Iskra Danilovgrad	152	(7)
2021–2022	Sutjeska Nikšić	53	(0)
2023	Shakhtyor Soligorsk	0	(0)
2023–2025	Kerala Blasters	40	(3)
2025–2026	BG Pathum United	10	(0)
2026	Budućnost	7	(0)
2026–	Hougang United	3	(0)

International career
2015–2017	Montenegro U17	6	(0)
2016–2018	Montenegro U19	8	(1)
2016–2020	Montenegro U21	16	(1)
- * Club domestic league appearances and goals as of 17 June 2026

Miloš Drinčić (Serbian Cyrillic: Милош Дринчић; born 14 February 1999) is a Montenegrin professional footballer who plays primarily as a centre-back for Singapore Premier League club Hougang United.

== Club career ==
=== Iskra Danilovgrad ===
Drinčić started his professional career with Iskra Danilovgrad in 2016 as a 16-years old. He make his professional debut on 20 August 2016 playing the entire match against Petrovac in a 4–0 win. On 17 September, he scored the only goal in the match to secure a 3 points in a league win against Bokelj Kotor. Drinčić was then named as the club captain ahead of the 2018–19 season at 18-years old. He established himself as a key starter at the club, making over 160 games and tallying seven goals.

=== Sutjeska Nikšić ===
Drinčić left Iskra Danilovgrad in 2021 to join Sutjeska Niksic, where he made 62 appearances in two years. He played in the UEFA Champions League qualifiers, Europa League qualifiers, and Europa Conference League qualifiers during his stay with the club. He also won the 2021–22 Montenegrin First League with the club.

=== Shakhtyor Soligorsk ===
In January 2023, during the winter transfer window, Drinčić was transferred to Belarusian Premier League club Shakhtyor Soligorsk for an undisclosed transfer fee. He suffered an injury that kept him sidelined for a prolonged period. He only made one appearance for the club across all the competition in the Belarusian Cup. With the club, Drinčić won the 2023 Belarusian Super Cup.

=== Kerala Blasters ===
On 14 August 2023, Drinčić completed a move to the Indian Super League club Kerala Blasters. He signed a one-year contract with the Blasters and became the first Montenegrin player to sign for the club. He made his debut for the club on 21 September, in the season opener against Bengaluru at home, which the Blasters won 2–1. In Kerala Blasters' 2–1 loss against Mumbai City on 8 October, Drinčić was sent off after pushing Yoell van Nieff from side in the ensuing melée, during the final minutes of the injury time in the second half. He was later handed a three-match suspension. Drinčić scored his first goal for the club in his comeback game against Hyderabad on 25 November, helping the Blasters in a 1–0 win. He would score his second goal of the season on 12 February 2024 against Punjab, where he scored the only goal for the team, as the Blasters lost the match 1–2 at full-time.

Following a impressive debut season, Drinčić signed a two-year contract extension with the Blasters till 2026 in July 2024. In September, he was appointed as the vice-captain of the club. He played his first match as the captain in club's opening game against Punjab on 15 September when Adrian Luna missed the game due to sickness, where the Blasters suffered 1–2 loss.

=== BG Pathum United ===
On 17 June 2025, Drinčić completed a move to Thai League 1 club BG Pathum United.

== International career ==
Drinčić was a part of the Montenegro's under-17, under-19 and under-21 teams. He has also captained the under-21 team during the 2019 UEFA European Under-21 Championship qualification.

== Career statistics ==
=== Club ===
As of match played 27 July 2024

Club	Season	League			Cup		Continental		Others		Total	
Club	Season	Division	Apps	Goals	Apps	Goals	Apps	Goals	Apps	Goals	Apps	Goals
FK Iskra Danilovgrad	2016–17	Montenegrin First League	29	1	4	0	—		—		33	1
FK Iskra Danilovgrad	2017–18	Montenegrin First League	31	2	—		—		—		31	2
FK Iskra Danilovgrad	2018–19	Montenegrin First League	33	1	—		—		—		33	1
FK Iskra Danilovgrad	2019–20	Montenegrin First League	27	0	2	0	—		—		29	0
FK Iskra Danilovgrad	2020–21	Montenegrin First League	32	3	2	0	2 (Note: Appearances in 2020–21 UEFA Europa League First Qualifying Round)	0	—		36	3
FK Iskra Danilovgrad	Iskra Danilovgrad total		152	7	8	0	2	0	—		162	7
FK Sutjeska Nikšić	2021–22	Montenegrin First League	34	0	3	1	4 (Note: Appearances in 2021–22 UEFA Europa Conference League qualifying round)	0	—		41	1
FK Sutjeska Nikšić	2022–23	Montenegrin First League	19	0	1	0	4 (Note: Appearances in 2022–23 UEFA Champions League qualifying round and 2022–23 UEFA Europa Conference League qualifying round)	0	—		24	0
FK Sutjeska Nikšić	Sutjeska Nikšić total		53	0	4	1	8	0	—		65	1
FC Shakhtyor Soligorsk	2023	Belarusian Premier League	0	0	0	0	0	0	—		0	0
Kerala Blasters FC	2023–24	Indian Super League	19	2	3	0	—		—		22	2
Kerala Blasters FC	2024–25	Indian Super League	—		—		—		—		—	
Kerala Blasters FC	Kerala Blasters total		19	2	3	0	—		—		22	2
Career total			224	9	15	1	10	0	—		249	10

== Honours ==
Sutjeska Nikšić

- Montenegrin First League: 2021–22

Shakhtyor Soligorsk

- Belarusian Super Cup: 2023
