= Mohammed Aimen =

Indian football player

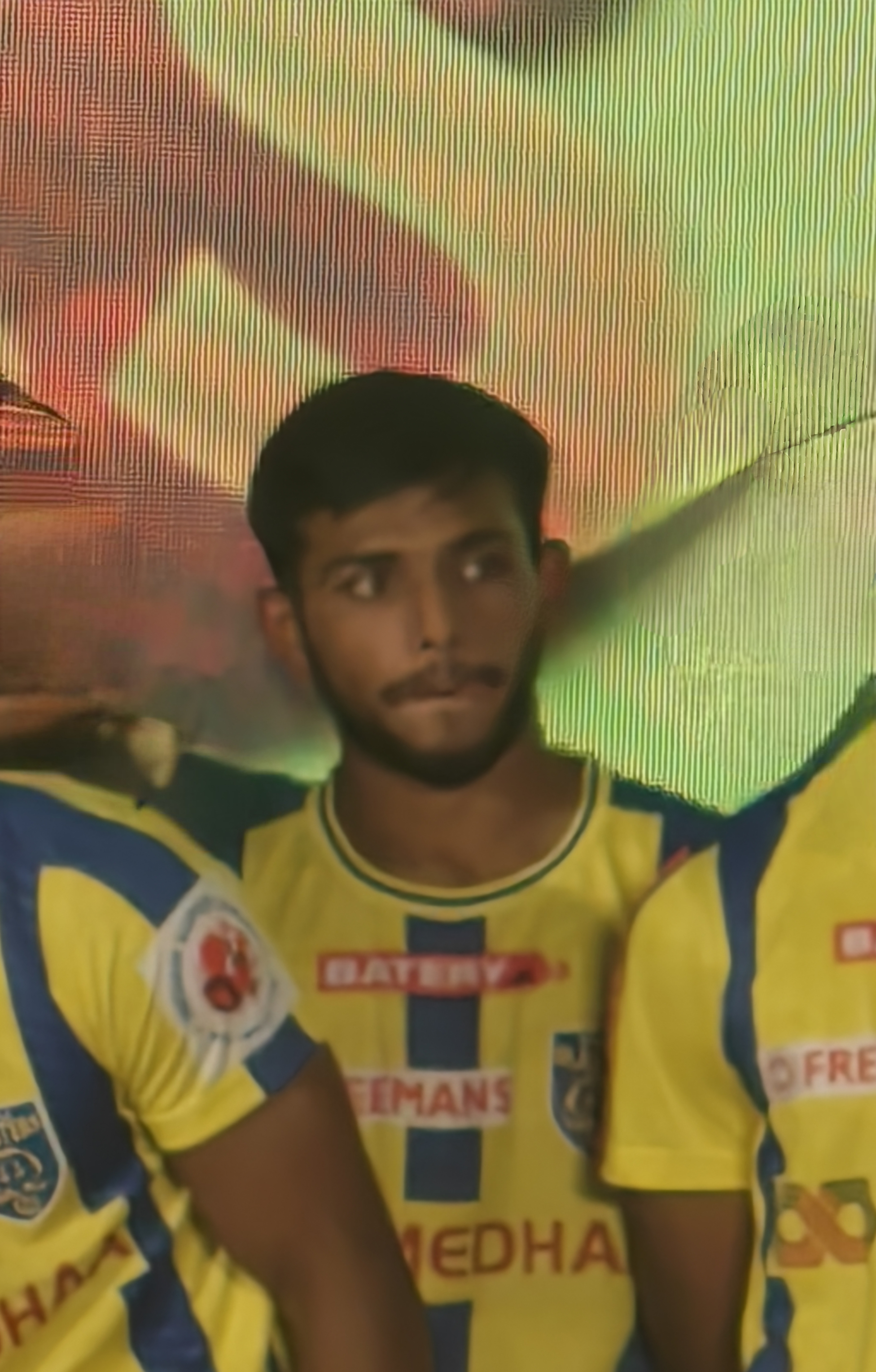
- Aimen in 2024

Personal information
- Date of birth: 20 January 2003 (age 23)
- Place of birth: Lakshadweep, India
- Height: 1.73 m (5 ft 8 in)
- Position: Midfielder

Team information
- Current team: SC Delhi
- Number: 23

Youth career
- Don Bosco FA
- 2018–2022: Kerala Blasters

Senior career*
| Years | Team | Apps | (Gls) |
| 2021–2022 | Kerala Blasters B | 11 | (2) |
| 2022–2026 | Kerala Blasters | 31 | (1) |
| 2026– | SC Delhi | 6 | (2) |

International career^{‡}
| 2024–2025 | India U23 | 10 | (2) |
- * Club domestic league appearances and goals as of 17:30, 10 April 2026 (UTC) ‡ National team caps and goals as of 19:00, 10 October 2025 (UTC)

Mohammed Aimen (born 20 January 2003) is an Indian professional footballer who plays as a midfielder for Indian Super League club SC Delhi.

== Club career ==
=== Kerala Blasters ===
==== Youth and early career ====
Aimen, along with his twin brother Azhar joined the Kerala Blasters Academy in 2018 at the age of fifteen, after a short spell in the Don Bosco football academy. The twins had moved to Kerala from Lakshadweep for their schooling and attended the Kerala Blasters U-15 trials, getting selected in the process. Aimen then rose through the ranks along with his brother and played for the under-15 and under-18 teams of the Blasters. Aimen eventually made it to Kerala Blasters reserves and played for them in the 2022 RFDL. He played 7 games in the tournament, which was held from 2022 April to May, where the team emerged as the runners-up and qualified for the Next Gen Cup. Aimen then played for the side in the Next Gen Cup held in United Kingdom in July 2022.

==== 2022–2023: Rise to the first team ====
In August 2022, with the first team preparing for the 2022–23 Indian Super League season in UAE, Kerala Blasters fielded their reserves for the 2022 Durand Cup, where Aimen was included in the squad. He scored three goals, including a brace against NorthEast United and registered one assist, from five appearances during the tournament. Aimen was then promoted to the club's senior team ahead of the 2022–23 season along with Azhar, to train with them on a developmental role for the 2022–23 Indian Super League season. During the season, he played for the reserve team in the 2022–23 Kerala Premier League and the 2023 RFDL. In November 2022, Aimen and Azhar were sent to Poland for a three-week training stint with the Polish top-tier club Raków Częstochowa.

In April 2023, Aimen was included in the Kerala Blasters squad for the 2023 Super Cup. He finally made his official first team debut for Kerala Blasters on 16 April 2023 in the group stage match against Bengaluru FC, by coming as a substitute in the 77th minute for Rahul K.P, where the match ended in a draw.

==== 2023–present: Contract extension and league debut ====
On 9 May 2023, Kerala Blasters announced that Aimen has signed a three-year contract extension with the club, that would keep him with them until 2026. Aimen was included in the Blasters' starting eleven for the first time against on 13 August 2023 in the first game of 2023 Durand Cup against Gokulam Kerala, which the Blasters lost 3–4, where he played for the entire 90 minutes. In the match, he gave a stunning assist for Prabir Das' goal. Aimen scored his first official goal for Kerala Blasters senior team on 18 August against Bengaluru reserves, after coming as a substitute in the 67th minute. On 21 August, he scored his second goal of the tournament against Indian Air Force, which was also his fifth goal in Durand cup overall.

Aimen made his Indian Super League debut for the club on 21 September in the season opener at home, against Bengaluru FC, which the Blasters won 2–1. He also became the first player from Lakshadweep to play in the Indian Super League. On 14 December, Aimen produced a player-of-the-match display against Punjab FC. He earned a penalty in the 51st minute, which Diamantakos successfully converted into a goal, and helped the Blasters in a 1–0 win.

After assisting in the Blasters' first competitive match of the 2024–25 season against Mumbai City FC in the 2024 Durand Cup, Aimen came in as a substitute against Punjab FC on 4 August in the same tournament and scored the equalizer for the Blasters to seal them a 1–1 draw. He would score his second of the tournament in the next match against CISF Protectors, which they won 7–0.

== International career ==
=== Youth career ===
In March 2024, Aimen was included in the final 23-member squad of the Indian national under-23 team to play two friendlies against Malaysia. He made his debut for the side on 22 March in a 1–2 loss, where he played for 87 minutes.

== Personal life ==
Aimen's twin brother Mohammed Azhar is also a professional footballer; both twins joined Kerala Blasters academy at the same time in 2018. Born in Lakshadweep, the twins later grew up in Kochi, Kerala, as their father worked at the Lakshadweep Communication in Kochi.

== Career statistics ==
=== Club ===
As of matches played 3 November 2025

| Club | Season | League | | | Cup (Note: Includes Super Cup) | | Continental | | Other (Note: includes Durand Cup) | | Total | |
| Club | Season | Division | Apps | Goals | Apps | Goals | Apps | Goals | Apps | Goals | Apps | Goals |
|---|---|---|---|---|---|---|---|---|---|---|---|---|
| Kerala Blasters B | 2022 | RFDL | 7 | 0 | — | | — | | — | | 7 | 0 |
| Kerala Blasters B | 2023 | RFDL | 4 | 2 | — | | — | | — | | 4 | 2 |
| Kerala Blasters B | Total | | 11 | 2 | 0 | 0 | 0 | 0 | 0 | 0 | 11 | 2 |
| Kerala Blasters | 2022–23 | Indian Super League | 0 | 0 | 1 | 0 | — | | 5 | 3 | 6 | 3 |
| Kerala Blasters | 2023–24 | Indian Super League | 21 | 1 | 3 | 1 | — | | 3 | 2 | 27 | 4 |
| Kerala Blasters | 2024–25 | Indian Super League | 10 | 0 | 1 | 0 | — | | 4 | 2 | 15 | 2 |
| Kerala Blasters | 2025–26 | Indian Super League | 0 | 0 | 2 | 0 | — | | 0 | 0 | 2 | 0 |
| Kerala Blasters | Total | | 31 | 1 | 7 | 1 | 0 | 0 | 12 | 7 | 50 | 9 |
| SC Delhi | 2025–26 | Indian Super League | 0 | 0 | 0 | 0 | — | | 0 | 0 | 0 | 0 |
| Career total | | | 42 | 3 | 7 | 1 | 0 | 0 | 12 | 7 | 61 | 11 |
