= Suguna =

Suguna may refer to:

== People ==
- Suguna Purushothaman (1941–2015), Indian vocalist
- Suguna Varadachari, Indian vocalist
- M. Suguna (born 1952), Indian politician
- Chellamalla Suguna Kumari (born 1955), Indian parliamentarian

== Other uses ==
- Suguna Foods, Indian food products company
- Suguna Holdings, Indian poultry group
- Suguna Vilasa Sabha, club in India
- Keraliya Suguna Bodhini, Indian magazine
