= 2022–23 Kerala Blasters FC season =

9th season in existence of Kerala Blasters FC

Kerala Blasters
2022–23 season
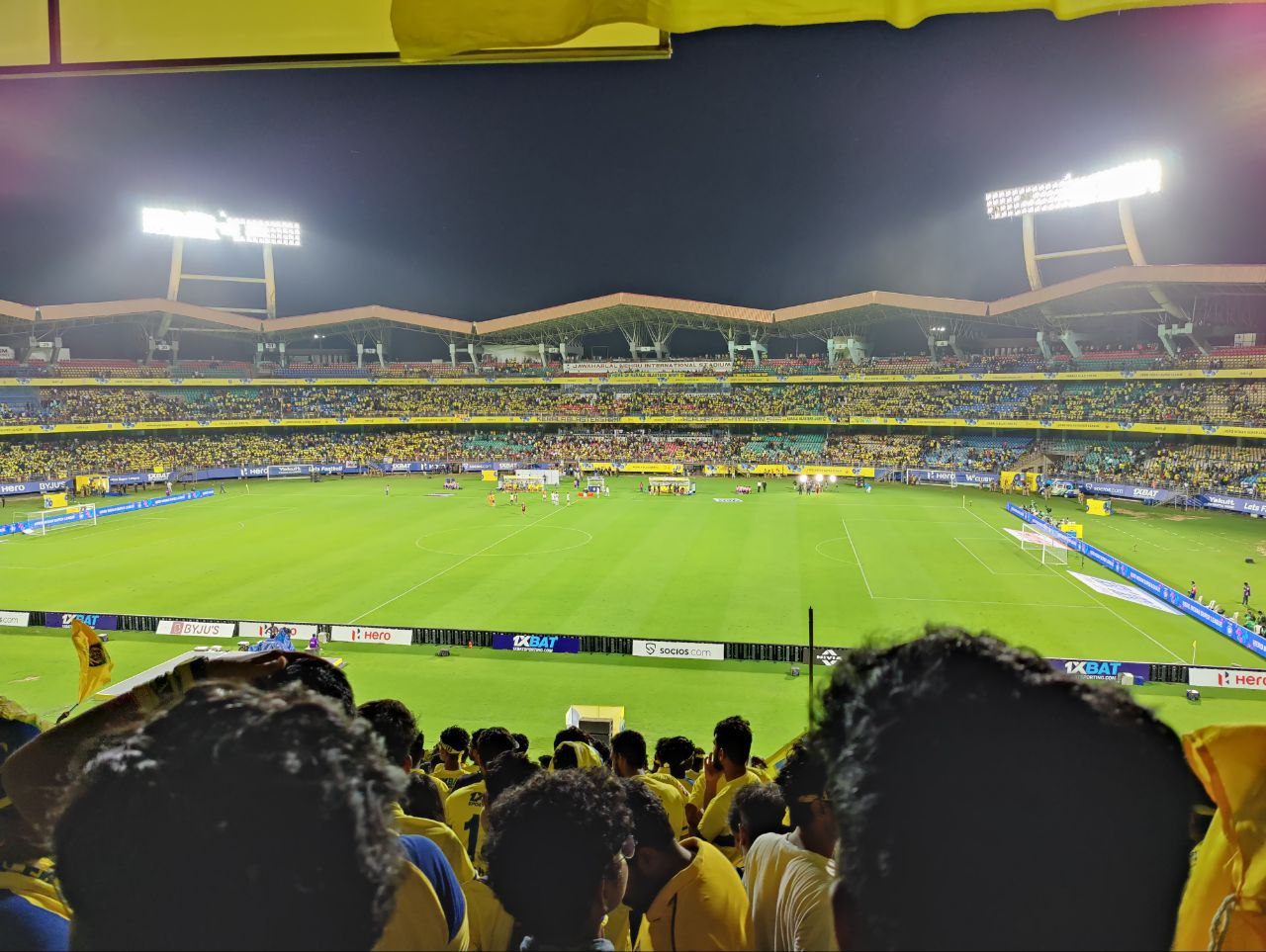
- Owner: Magnum Sports Private Limited
- Chairman: Nikhil Bhardwaj
- Head coach: Ivan Vukomanović; Frank Dauwen (Note: When AIFF imposed a 10 match ban on Ivan Vukomanović from AIFF held tournaments, assistant coach Frank Dauwen was in charge of the team for the 2023 Indian Super Cup.)
- Stadium: Jawaharlal Nehru Stadium, Kochi, Kerala
- Indian Super League: 5th
- Indian Super Cup: Group-stage
- Durand Cup: Quarter-finals
- ISL Playoffs: Knockout
- Top goalscorer: League: Dimitrios Diamantakos (10); All: Dimitrios Diamantakos (12)
- Highest home attendance: 34,984; Kerala Blasters 2–5 ATK Mohun Bagan FC, 16 October 2022
- Lowest home attendance: 18,018; Kerala Blasters 2–0 NorthEast United FC, 29 January 2023
- Average home league attendance: 28,057
- Biggest win: 3–1 (vs East Bengal FC (H), 7 October 2022, Indian Super League) (vs FC Goa (H), 12 November 2022, Indian Super League) (vs Jamshedpur FC (H), 22 January 2023, Indian Super League) (vs RoundGlass Punjab FC (H), 8 April 2023, Indian Super Cup)
- Biggest defeat: 4–0 (vs Mumbai City FC (A), 8 January 2023, Indian Super League)
Home colours	Away colours	Third colours
- All statistics correct as of 16 April 2023.

The 2022–23 season was the ninth season in Kerala Blasters FC's existence, as well as their ninth season in the Indian Super League. This season of the ISL witnessed the return of the home-away format of the matches similar to that of the 2019–20 Indian Super League season after a break of two years due to the COVID-19 pandemic in the country.

In this season, the Blasters travelled to United Arab Emirates for their pre-season preparations, but were forced to cancel all of their friendlies in UAE after AIFF received a ban from FIFA for 'third party intervention'. But the ban was revoked by FIFA just ten days later and Blasters played one friendly each in UAE and in Kerala ahead of the league season. When the Blasters' main team flew to UAE for their pre-season preparations, the Blasters sent their reserve team for the 2022 Durand Cup, and reached the quarter-finals after advancing to the knockout stage as group runner-ups, but was knocked out by Mohammedan SC from the tournament. After the 2021–22 season, the Blasters only retained Marko Lešković and Adrián Luna as their foreigner players on two year contracts, and replaced the departed foreigners with Apostolos Giannou, Víctor Mongil, Ivan Kalyuzhnyi and Dimitrios Diamantakos. The Blasters retained sixteen players from the previous squad and included seven local players from the state for the upcoming ISL season.

Same like the previous season, the Blasters played the opening match of the ISL season on 7 October 2022, but this time against East Bengal FC, which they won 3–1 at full-time. After the opening match, the Blasters went on a three match losing streak, but they came back to their winning ways against NorthEast United FC on 5 November by 0–3 away from home. After the Blasters lost three consecutive matches after the opening match, the Blasters went on a five match winning streak, which became a new club record, and went on an eight match unbeaten streak, until 8 January 2023, where the Blasters met Mumbai City FC, as the Islander handed the Blasters their worst defeat of the season by the score of 4–0. Following the match against Mumbai City, the Blasters only won only two of their remaining league stage matches, and stood 5th in the table at the end of the regular season and qualified for the knockout stages of the tournament. This was the first time the Blasters managed to qualify for the ISL knockout stages for a second consecutive year and it was their fourth appearance in the knockout stages in their history.

With the arrival of a new format to ISL playoffs, the Blasters met arch-rivals Bengaluru FC in the first knockout stage match. The match that took place on 3 March was subjected to immense controversy and is known for the Blasters' walk-off. The Blasters players forfeited the match in the extra-time following the controversy around the legitimacy of the free-kick goal scored by the Sunil Chhetri for Bengaluru in the 96th minute of the extra-time. When the referee rejected the argument of the players and staff members of the free-kick being taken before the Blasters players set themselves in their defensive positions, coach Ivan Vukomanović called-off the players from the pitch into the dressing room. The match referee blew the final whistle and Bengaluru was awarded the win following a discussion with the match commissioner, resulting in the elimination of the Blasters from the tournament. The Blasters management then appealed to the AIFF for the match to be replayed and demanded for the match referee Crystal John to banned from refereeing. A separate panel of AIFF disciplinary committee was met three days later to decide on the sanctions on the Blasters for forfeiting the game, and the disciplinary committee rejected the Blasters' protest to replay the match. The AIFF disciplinary committee that met later that month imposed a fine of rupees 4 crores on the Blasters for abandoning the game and asked them to issue a public apology within a week, failing which the club would have to pay a fine of rupees 6 crores. The disciplinary committee also imposed a 10-match ban on Vukomanović from taking part in any AIFF held tournaments along with a fine of rupees 5 lakhs, and directed the latter to issue a public apology within a week, same as that of the club, failing which the fine would be increased, doubling to rupees 10 lakhs. The club and Vukomanović then issued their apologies and 'regrets' as directed by the AIFF DC as a part of their verdict.

After the ISL season, the Blasters took part in the 2023 Indian Super Cup, which took place in Kozhikode, Kerala. The Blasters were drawn in Group A alongside Bengaluru FC. They won their first group stage match of the tournament on 8 April against RoundGlass Punjab FC by 3–1, but lost the next match against Sreenidi Deccan FC by 2–0 just four days later. They met again versus Bengaluru FC in a must-win match on 16 April, but the match ended in a 1–1 draw, and the Blasters were eliminated from the tournament that took place in their home state, and the Blasters ended yet another season without bagging a silverware.

== Kits ==
Supplier: SIX5SIX / Shirt front sponsor: BYJU'S / Shirt back sponsor: 1xBat Sporting Lines / Sleeve sponsor: Yakult & Denwud

Home	Away	Third

== Season overview ==
=== April ===
On 4 April 2022, the Blasters announced the three-year contract extension of head coach Ivan Vukomanović until 2025.

On 6 April, it was confirmed that the 10 home matches of the Blasters will be held in the Jawaharlal Nehru Stadium in Kochi.

On 7 April, the Blasters confirmed the participation of their youth squad in the first ever Reliance Foundation Development League.

On 10 April, the Blasters announced their squad for the inaugural season of the Reliance Foundation Development League.

On 21 April, the Blasters announced the three-year contract extension of defender Bijoy Varghese until 2025. The club also brought back their jersey number 21, which was retired in 2020 after Sandesh Jhingan, who previously donned the shirt left the club.

On 25 April, the Blasters announced the three-year contract extension of midfielder Jeakson Singh until 2025.

=== May ===
On 5 May, the Blasters announced the two-year contract extension of defender Marko Lešković until 2024.

On 11 May, the Blasters announced the two-year contract extension of goalkeeper Prabhsukhan Gill until 2024.

On 30 May, the Blasters announced the one-year contract extension of goalkeeper Karanjit Singh until 2023.

On 31 May, the Blasters announced the departure of the Spanish striker Álvaro Vázquez.

=== June ===
On 1 June, the Blasters announced the departure of the winger Vincy Barretto to Chennaiyin FC after reaching an agreement with the latter.

On 2 June, the Blasters announced the three-year contract extension of goalkeeping coach Slaven Progovecki, and the strength and conditioning coach Werner Martens until 2025.

On 2 June, the Blasters announced the appointment of Rajah Rizwan as the club's academy and women's team director.

On 2 June, the Blasters announced the departure of the Bhutanese forward Chencho Gyeltshen.

On 3 June, the Blasters announced the departures of the goalkeeper Albino Gomes and the winger Seityasen Singh.

On 4 June, the Blasters announced the three-year contract extension of defender Sandeep Singh until 2025.

On 15 June, the Blasters announced signing of Bryce Miranda from Churchill Brothers FC Goa for an undisclosed transfer fee on a four-year deal.

On 23 June, the Blasters announced that they have reached an agreement with Churchill Brothers for the transfer of Saurav Mandal with the transfer remaining subject to the medical.

On 24 June, the Blasters announced the departure of Bosnian defender Enes Sipović.

On 28 June, the Blasters announced the signing of Saurav Mandal from Churchill Brothers for an undisclosed transfer fee on a three-year deal.

=== July ===
On 4 July, the Blasters announced that they have reached an agreement with Mumbai City FC for the transfer of defender Sanjeev Stalin to Mumbai City.

On 6 July, the Blasters announced the departure of defender Denechandra Meitei to Odisha FC on a season long loan deal.

On 8 July, the Blasters announced the signing of Apostolos Giannou as their first foreign singing of the season with the transfer remaining subject to medical.

On 11 July, the Blasters announced the departure of the Argentine forward Jorge Pereyra Díaz.

On 13 July, the Blasters announced the signing of Víctor Mongil as their second foreign signing of the season in a one-year contract with an option to extend.

On 18 July, the Blasters announced the signing of Ivan Kalyuzhnyi as their third foreign signing of the season on a season long loan deal with the transfer remaining subject to medical.

On 18 July, the Blasters were drawn in the Group D of the 2022 Durand Cup tournament.

On 21 July, the Durand Cup announced the fixtures of the Blasters and the participating clubs.

On 21 July, the Blasters announced that they will be travelling to United Arab Emirates on 17 August until 29 August as a part of their pre-season preparations.

On 21 July, the Blasters announced the fixtures of their pre-season friendlies in UAE.

On 22 July, the Blasters announced the two-year contract extension of midfielder Adrián Luna until 2024.

On 23 July, the Blasters announced their squad for the 2022 Next Gen Cup in United Kingdom.

On 25 July, the Blasters announced the formation of their women's team and the appointment of Shereef Khan as the team's head coach for the upcoming season of the Kerala Women's League.

On 25 July, the fixtures of the 2022 Next Gen Cup was announced after the Blasters were drawn in the Group B (London Group) along with the Premier League sides Crystal Palace FC, Tottenham Hotspur FC and West Ham United FC.

=== August ===
On 3 August, the Blasters announced it has reached an agreement for the transfer of Naorem Mahesh Singh to East Bengal Club.

On 4 August, the Blasters announced the signing of Frank Dauwen as their assistant manager for the upcoming season.

On 16 August, the Blasters announced their squad for the 2022 Durand Cup tournament.

On 17 August, the Blasters announced the squad for their pre-season friendlies in UAE.

On 17 August, the Blasters announced the signing of the forward Bidyashagar Singh on a season long loan deal from Bengaluru FC.

On 17 August, the Blasters released the club statement on the cancellation of all of their pre-season friendlies in UAE due to the ban imposed by FIFA on AIFF.

On 18 August, the Blasters announced Yakult as one of their associate partners for the upcoming season.

On 18 August, the Blasters announced 1XBat Sporting Lines as their presenting sponsors for the upcoming season.

On 19 August, the Blasters played their first group-stage match in the Durand Cup against Sudeva Delhi FC which ended in a 1–1 draw. Ajsal opened the scoresheet for the Blasters in the 42nd minute, but Sudeva pulled one back through Kuki right at the stroke of half-time.

On 23 August, the Blasters played their second group-stage match in the Durand Cup against Odisha FC which they lost 2–0. Isaac Vanmalsawma scored the opening goal for Odisha followed by a goal scored by Saúl Crespo which resulted in the Blasters losing their second match in the group-stage.

On 25 August, the Blasters announced the signing of the Greek forward Dimitrios Diamantakos as their final foreign signing of the season.

On 27 August, the Blasters played their third group-stage match in the Durand Cup against NorthEast United FC, which they won 0–3, thus registering their first win in the 2022 Durand Cup. The Blasters found early lead through Mohammed Aimen, which was followed by the goal scored by Ajsal in the 55th minute. Aimen completed his brace in the 90th minute after his twin brother Mohammed Azhar assisted him which helped Azhar to complete his second assist of the game after he assisted to the goal scored by Ajsal.

On 28 August, after the FIFA ban on AIFF was revoked, the Blasters announced that they would play a friendly match against the UAE First Division League side Al Jazira Al Hamra Club on the same day.

On 28 August, the Blasters played their first pre-season friendly match of the season against the Emirati club Al Jazira Al Hamra, which they won 1–5 after Rahul, Mandal, Sahal, Diamantakos and the captain Jessel scored for the Blasters in contrast to the only goal scored by Al Jazira Al Hamra through a free-kick.

On 29 August, the Blasters announced the departures of Sreekuttan VS, Abdul Hakku and Anil Gaonkar from the club.

On 31 August, the Blasters played their final group-stage match in the Durand Cup against Army Green, which they won 2–0. Muhammed Aimen scored the first goal for the Blasters and Aritra Das scored the final goal for the latter, which helped the Blasters to qualify for the knockout stages of the Durand Cup for the first time in their history.

=== September ===
On 1 September, FSDL and the Indian Super League announced the fixtures for the 2022–23 ISL season, and it was decided that the Blasters would face East Bengal in Kochi on 7 October in the season opener.

On 9 September, the Blasters played their quarter-final match in the Durand Cup against Mohammedan SC, which they lost 3–0. Mohammedan netted their first goal through S. K. Faiaz, which was followed by a brace scored by the Nigerian Abiola Dauda in the second-half, which resulted in the elimination of the Blasters from the 131st edition of Durand Cup.

On 17 September, the Blasters played a friendly match against MA College Kothamangalam which they won 3–0 after Lešković, Dimitrios, and Mandal scored a goal each to secure the victory for the Blasters.

On 18 September, the Blasters launched their third-kit for the upcoming season, which was designed to pay tribute to those people residing in the coast lines of Kerala.

On 19 September, the Blasters announced that they have reached an agreement to mutually part ways with Prasanth Mohan, who left the club after spending 6 years for the Blasters.

On 21 September, the Blasters launched their away-kit for the upcoming season.

On 22 September, the Blasters announced Denwud as their associate partner for the upcoming season.

On 25 September, the Blasters announced ClubW as their travel partner for the upcoming season.

On 26 September, the Blasters launched their home-kit for the upcoming season.

On 26 September, the Blasters announced BodyFirst as their official nutrition partner for the upcoming season.

On 29 September, the Blasters announced Kalliyath TMT as one of their official partners for the upcoming season.

On 30 September, the Blasters announced their extension of association with the Suguna Foods' brand, DelFrez as their associate partner for the upcoming season.

=== October ===
On 3 October, the Blasters announced their extension of association with Ather Energy as one of their official partners for the upcoming season.

On 4 October, the Blasters announced the subsidiary of the Tata Group, Cromā as their official electronics partner for the upcoming season.

On 5 October, the Blasters announced ChicKing as their food partner for the upcoming season.

On 5 October, the Blasters announced their squad for the 2022–22 Indian Super League season.

On 6 October, the Blasters announced Bingo! as their snacking partner for the upcoming season.

On 7 October, the Blasters played the opening match of 2022–22 Indian Super League season against East Bengal Club, which they won 3–1. The match took place in JLN Kochi, and the first half ended with neither side scoring a goal. The opening goal of the match was scored by Adrián Luna, who netted a volley after receiving a long ball from Harmanjot Khabra in the 72nd minute. The Blasters found their next goal through Ivan Kalyuzhnyi, who came in as substitute for Apostolos Giannou and scored a solo goal, taking the score to 2–0. East Bengal pulled one back through a goal scored by Alex Lima, but Kalyuzhnyi completed his brace by a long-range volley just one minute after East Bengal found the net and took the scoreline to end with 3–1.

On 10 October, the Blasters announced Amaron as one of their official partners for the occurring season.

On 11 October, the Blasters announced that the BYUJ'S will continue as their principal partner for the next two seasons.

On 13 October, the Blasters announced KIWI Ice Cream as one of their official partner for the occurring season.

On 14 October, the Blasters announced Welcare Hospital as their official medical partner for the occurring season.

On 16 October, the Blasters played their second match of the season against ATK Mohun Bagan FC, which they lost 2–5. Kalyuzhnyi's goal gave the Blasters an early lead in 6th minute of the match, but was equalized by ATK Mohun Bagan through a goal scored by Dimitri Petratos in the 26th minute, who would soon go on the complete his hat-trick with two more goals coming in the second half. Joni Kauko and Lenny Rodrigues scored the other two goals for ATKMB in the first half and second-half respectively, while the Blasters found their second goal through a goal scored by Rahul KP in the 81st minute, who came in as a substitute for Sahal Abdul Samad later in the game, which ended in a disastrous defeat for the Blasters in Kochi.

On 23 October, the Blasters played their third match of the season against Odisha FC, which they lost 2–1. The Blasters opened the score-sheet through Harmanjot Khabra, who netted the ball set-up by Luna by a header in the first-half. The game was snatched by Odisha in the second-half when they pulled two goals back through the goals scored by Jerry Mawihmingthanga, and a late goal scored by the substitute Pedro Martín, which saw the Blasters losing their second-consecutive match of the season.

On 28 October, the Blasters played their fourth match of the season against Mumbai City FC, which they lost 0–2. Mumbai found their first goal in the 21st minute by Mehtab Singh, which was followed by the goal scored by the ex-Blasters player Jorge Pereyra Díaz, who netted the ball in the 31st minute of the match, as the Blasters lost their third-consecutive match of the season.

=== November ===
On 5 November, the Blasters played their fifth match of the season against NorthEast United FC, which they won 0–3. The first-half on the match held in Indira Gandhi Athletic Stadium went goalless, but the Blasters found their first goal of the match when Dimitrios Diamantakos shook the net after receiving a ball from Saurav Mandal from the wing in the 56th minute. Sahal Abdul Samad came in as a substitute for Mandal in the 65th minute of the match, who scored a brace in the last moments of the match as the Blasters won their second match of the season.

On 12 November, the Blasters announced Bank of Baroda as their official banking partner for the occurring season.

On 13 November, the Blasters played their sixth match of the season against FC Goa, which they won 3–1. The majority of the first-half passed with neither side scoring a goal, until Luna's goal in the 42nd minute gave the Blasters a 1–0 lead. Blasters extended their lead in the added time of the first-half, as Diamantakos scored a penalty right before the half-time. The Blasters found their third goal of the match through Kalyuzhnyi, who netted a long-ranger in the 52nd minute of the match. Goa pulled one back through Noah Sadaoui in the 67th minute, but the Blasters managed to win their third match of the season.

On 19 November, the Blasters played their seventh match of the season against Hyderabad FC, which they won 0–1. The sole goal of the match in the G. M. C. Balayogi Athletic Stadium was scored by Diamantakos in the 18th minute of the game, who scored in his third-consecutive match, as the Blasters defeated the reigning championship winners putting an end to their unbeaten-streak and winning their fourth match of the season. It was also the first time ever that the club made three consecutive win in its history.

=== December ===
On 4 December 2022, the Blasters played their eighth match of the season against Jamshedpur FC which they won 0–1. Diamantakos scored in his fourth-consecutive match in the 17th minute after tapping in a Luna's freekick which served as the only goal as the Blasters won their fourth-consecutive match by defeating the reigning league champions away from home.

On 11 December, the Blasters played their ninth match of the season against the southern rivals Bengaluru FC, which they won 3–2. Bengaluru scored the opening goal through a penalty scored by Sunil Chettri in the 14th minute, but the Blasters equalized through Marko Lešković, who scored his debut goal in the 25th minute of the match. Diamantakos, who scored in his fifth-consecutive match gave the Blasters lead for the first time in the game when he slotted in a ball assisted by Luna in the 43rd minute right before the half-time. Apostolos Giannou scored the third goal of the night for the Blasters, who came in as a substitute for Kalyuzhnyi and scored his debut goal in the 70th minute. Javi Hernández scored the second goal for Bengaluru in the 81st minute but the Blasters managed to win the match by full-time thereby winning their fifth-consecutive match of the season.

On 19 December, the Blasters played their tenth match of the season against the older southern rivals Chennaiyin FC, which ended in a 1–1 draw. The Blasters scored the first goal of the night through Sahal, who scored for the Blasters in the 23rd minute but Chennaiyin levelled the match three minutes into the second-half through the former Blasters man Vincy Barretto, who netted the ball as the match ended in a 1–1 draw.

On 26 December, the Blasters played their eleventh match of the season in the Boxing Day match against Odisha FC, which they won 1–0. The first-half ended with neither sides finding the net, but the Blasters took their lead in the 86th minute through Sandeep Singh, who scored a header from a Bryce Miranda assist as the sole goal from Sandeep helped the Blasters to win their seventh match of the season and to move to the third spot in the table.

On 29 December, the Blasters announced that they have reached an agreement for the transfer of Puitea to ATK Mohun Bagan for an undisclosed transfer fee.

=== January ===
On 3 January 2023, the Blasters played their twelfth match of the season against Jamshedpur FC, which they won 3–1. Giannou's backheel flick in the 9th minute put the Blasters in a 1–0 early lead, but Jamshedpur found the level through Daniel Chima Chukwu in the 17th minute. Diamantakos, who scored his sixth goal of the season put the Blasters ahead when he scored from the spot in the 31st minute, which was followed by a second-half goal netted by Luna in the 65th minute. This was also the 200th goal for the club in the Indian Super League and became the fourth team to do so, as the Blasters won their eighth match of the season.

On 9 January, the Blasters played their thirteenth match of the season against Mumbai City FC, which they lost 4–0. The Blasters conceded all four goal in the first-half as the ex-Blasters player Jorge Pereyra Díaz scored a brace, along with a goal each by both Greg Stewart and Bipin Singh. This defeat marked the end of the Blasters' eight match unbeaten streak.

On 20 January, it was announced that the twins; Muhammed Aimen and Mohammed Azhar, who represented the club in the 2022 Durand Cup and in the ongoing Kerala Premier League season, were promoted to the first-team.

On 22 January, the Blasters played their fourteenth match of the season against FC Goa, which they lost 3–1. Iker Guarrotxena gave the lead to Goa through a penalty which was doubled by Noah Sadaoui in the first-half. Blasters pulled one back through Diamantakos, who scored his seventh goal of the season in the 51st minute of the match but Redeem Tlang scored the third goal of the night for Goa, as the Blasters lost their fifth game of the season.

On 24 January, the Blasters provided a statement on the injury sustained by Sandeep Singh during the match against FC Goa on 22 January. He sustained a fracture in his ankle during impact after a collision with Goa's Saviour Gama and had to get stitches in his head before being taken out from the match. The club statement further added that Sandeep would undergo a surgery for the same.

On 29 January, the Blasters played their fifteenth match of the season against NorthEast United FC, which they won 2–0. The match was goalless until the 42nd minute where Diamantakos scored a header from an assist from Bryce Miranda, and he completed his brace just two minutes after in the 44th minute, when Luna assisted for the Greek striker as he scored an open-goal thereby doubling their lead before the half-time. The match witnessed no goal in the second-half but the first-half brace from Diamantakos helped the Blasters to win their ninth match of the season.

On 30 January, the Blasters announced that Givson Singh has been loaned-out to Chennaiyin FC for the rest of the season.

On 31 January, the Blasters announced that they have signed midfielder Danish Farooq Bhat from rivals Bengaluru FC on a three-and-a-half-year contract for an undisclosed fee until 2026.

=== February ===
On 3 February, the Blasters played their sixteenth match of the season against East Bengal Club, which they lost 1–0. Cleiton Silva scored the only goal of the match for East Bengal as the Blasters lost their sixth match of the season.

On 6 February, the Blasters announced Indian cricketer Sanju Samson as their new brand ambassador.

On 7 February, the Blasters played their seventeenth match of the season against Chennaiyin FC, which they won 2–1. Abdenasser El Khayati scored an early goal for Chennaiyin but the Blasters levelled the goal when Luna netted the ball in the 38th minute of the game. Rahul broke the deadlock and won the match for the Blasters as he scored the second goal for the Blasters in the 64th minute and the Blasters won their tenth game of the season, edging near the qualification to knockout stages of the season.

On 11 February, the Blasters played their eighteenth match of the season against Bengaluru FC, which they lost 1–0. Roy Krishna put Bengaluru in front in the 32nd minute of the match as the Blasters lost their seventh match of the season.

On 16 February, the Blasters qualified for the ISL playoffs for the second consecutive time following the 1–2 defeat of FC Goa over Chennaiyin FC. This was the Blasters' fourth qualification to the ISL playoffs in their history.

On 18 February, the Blasters played their nineteenth match of the season against ATK Mohun Bagan FC, which they lost 2–1. Diamantakos scored his tenth goal of the season in the 16th minute of the match to put the Blasters in front, but ATK Mohun Bagan levelled through Carl McHugh in the 23rd minute and scored his second goal in the 71st minute. Rahul was sent-off for a second yellow in the 64th minute as the Blasters lost their eighth match of the season.

On 22 February, the Blasters launched 'House of KBFC', a consumer-focused initiative of the football club.

On 23 February, the Blasters announced the contract extension of their sporting director Karolis Skinkys on a five-year contract till 2028.

On 26 February, the Blasters played their twentieth and last match of the league stage against Hyderabad FC, which they lost 0–1. The only goal of the match was scored by Borja Herrera, who put Hyderabad in front inn the first-half, as the Blasters lost their ninth match of the season.

=== March ===
On 3 March, the Blasters played their knockout match in the playoffs against rivals Bengaluru FC, which was subjected to immense controversy. The match went to extra-time after the first ninety minutes ended in a goalless draw. The match was subjected to controversy when the Bengaluru skipper Sunil Chhetri scored a 'free-kick' goal in the 96th minute. Following the goal, the Blasters players walked-off the pitch after coach Ivan Vukomanović called them off from the pitch. The incident occurred when Chhetri scored a free-kick before the Blasters players set themselves in their defensive positions. The goal was given for Bengaluru and the Blasters players walked-off from the pitch in the Sree Kanteerava Stadium. The match was later stopped by the match officials and Bengaluru was awarded the win and qualification the semi-finals. The Blasters later alleged that the referee asked Luna to move away from the ball and hence the free kick should have only been allowed following a whistle. The club sought a rematch and a ban on the referee Crystal John, who controlled the match.

On 6 March, the AIFF disciplinary committee rejected the Blasters' protest to replay the controversial knockout stage match against Bengaluru FC and to ban the match referee Crystal John. The separate panel of the AIFF DC that met on the day rejected the case of the Blasters citing that the case did not fall in the exception mentioned in the Article 70.5 of the AIFF disciplinary code, and further issued a notice to the Blasters for the violation of the Article 58.1 of the AIFF disciplinary code by walking-out of the match.

On 7 March, the AIFF announced the draw for the 2023 Indian Super Cup that is to be held in Kerala from 3 April, and the Blasters was drawn in the Group A alongside the rivals Bengaluru FC.

On 28 March, the Times of India sports journalist Marcus Megulhao reported that the Blasters would be penalized upto rupees 5 crores by the AIFF DC for walking-out of the playoff match against Bengaluru.

On 29 March, the Blasters announced that Adrián Luna will not be part of the Blasters squad for the upcoming Super Cup, as he was granted extended leave for personal reasons.

On 31 March, AIFF DC imposed a fine of rupees 4 crores on the Blasters for walking off the pitch in the playoff match against Bengaluru on 3 March, and also imposed a 10-match ban and a fine of rupees 5 lakhs on coach Ivan Vukomanović and directed both the parties to issue a public apology within a week. The committee also stated that if the Blasters and Vukomanović fails to issue their public apologies within a week, the fine would be raised to rupees 6 crores to the Blasters management and rupees10 lakhs to Vukomanović.

=== April ===
On 2 April, the Blasters and the coach Ivan Vukomanović issued their apologies for the walk-off in the match against Bengaluru on March, as demanded by the AIFF DC two days before in their verdict on the issue.

On 3 April, the Blasters announced their squad for the 2023 Indian Super Cup. Eleven local Kerala players were added to the squad for the tournament.

On 8 April, the Blasters played their first group stage match in the Super Cup against the reigning I-League champions RoundGlass Punjab FC, which they won 3–1. The Blasters ended the first-half in a 1–0 lead when Diamantakos netted the penalty in the 41st minute, as a result of a foul on Saurav Mandal in the penalty box. The Blasters doubled their lead in the 54th minute when Nishu Kumar scored his first goal of the season from a ball by Sahal. Krishananda Singh pulled one back for Punjab in the 73rd minute, but Rahul K. P. who came in as a substitute for Diamantakos sealed the victory for the Blasters in the final seconds of the additional time from a miss pass from the Punjab player Juan Mera as the Blasters won the match 3–1 at full-time. This was the first ever victory for the club in the Indian Super Cup. This game also marked the first team debut for the Blasters' goalkeeper Sachin Suresh.

On 12 April, the Blasters played their second group stage match in the Super Cup against Sreenidi Deccan FC, which they lost 2–0. Sreenidi opened the scoresheet in the 17th minute through Rilwan Hassan and doubled their lead by a volley before the half-time through David Castañeda in the 44th minute, as the Blasters lost their first match of the tournament.

On 16 April, the Blasters played their last group stage match in the Super Cup against the rivals Bengaluru FC, which ended in a 1–1 draw. Roy Krishna put Bengaluru in front in the 23rd minute of the first-half, but Diamantakos scored a 77th minute header to level the match, but the Blasters were eliminated from the tournament as they finished third in the table.

== Players ==
=== Indian Super League Squad ===
No.	Name	Nationality	Position(s)	Date of Birth (Age)
Goalkeepers
1	Karanjit Singh	(India)	GK	8 January 1986 (age 40)
13	Prabhsukhan Singh Gill	(India)	GK	2 January 2001 (age 25)
31	Sachin Suresh	(India)	GK	18 January 2001 (age 25)
78	Muheet Shabir	(India)	GK	7 August 2001 (age 25)
Defenders
3	Sandeep Singh	(India)	CB/LB/RB	1 March 1995 (age 31)
4	Ruivah Hormipam	(India)	CB	25 January 2001 (age 25)
10	Harmanjot Khabra	(India)	RB/CM	18 December 1988 (age 37)
14	Jessel Carneiro (Captain)	(India)	LB	14 July 1990 (age 36)
21	Bijoy Varghese	(India)	CB	14 March 2000 (age 26)
22	Nishu Kumar	(India)	RB/LB	5 October 1997 (age 29)
23	Víctor Mongil	(Spain)	CB/CDM	21 July 1992 (age 34)
55	Marko Lešković	(Croatia)	CB	27 April 1991 (age 35)
Midfielders
6	Danish Farooq Bhat	(India)	LM	9 May 1996 (age 30)
8	Ayush Adhikari	(India)	CM	30 July 2000 (age 26)
18	Sahal Samad	(India)	CM/AM	1 April 1997 (age 29)
20	Adrián Luna (Vice-captain)	(Uruguay)	AM/LW/RW/CM/CF	12 March 1992 (age 34)
25	Jeakson Singh	(India)	CDM/CB	21 June 2001 (age 25)
27	Saurav Mandal	(India)	LM/LW	6 November 2000 (age 26)
28	Nihal Sudeesh	(India)	RW	18 June 2001 (age 25)
32	Mohammed Azhar	(India)	CM	20 January 2003 (age 23)
33	Vibin Mohanan	(India)	CM	6 February 2003 (age 23)
77	Ivan Kalyuzhnyi	(Ukraine)	CM	21 January 1998 (age 28)
81	Bryce Miranda	(India)	LW	23 September 1999 (age 27)
Forwards
9	Dimitrios Diamantakos	(Greece)	ST	5 March 1993 (age 33)
17	Rahul K. P.	(India)	RW/CF	16 March 2000 (age 26)
19	Mohammed Aimen	(India)	CF	20 January 2003 (age 23)
30	Bidyashagar Singh	(India)	CF	11 March 1998 (age 28)
45	Sreekuttan M S	(India)	CF	30 November 2004 (age 21)
99	Apostolos Giannou	(Australia)	ST	25 January 1990 (age 36)

=== Durand Cup Squad ===
No.	Name	Nationality	Position(s)	Date of Birth (Age)
Goalkeepers
1	Sachin Suresh (Captain)	(India)	GK	18 January 2001 (age 25)
13	Muhammed Murshad	(India)	GK	22 March 2004 (age 22)
77	Muhammed Jaseen	(India)	GK	5 January 2004 (age 22)
Defenders
3	Marvaan Hussain	(India)	DF	14 May 2004 (age 22)
5	Tejas Krishna S	(India)	DF	9 June 2001 (age 25)
12	Muhammed Basith	(India)	DF	15 August 2002 (age 24)
19	Sherin Salari	(India)	DF	8 February 2004 (age 22)
20	Abhiram K	(India)	DF	3 November 2004 (age 22)
33	Muhammed Saheef	(India)	DF	7 February 2003 (age 23)
55	Adhil Ashraf	(India)	DF	25 July 2004 (age 22)
66	Aritra Das	(India)	DF	27 May 2003 (age 23)
Midfielders
6	Mohammed Azhar	(India)	MF	20 January 2003 (age 23)
8	Vibin Mohanan	(India)	MF	6 February 2003 (age 23)
10	Gaurav Kankonkar	(India)	MF	17 November 1996 (age 29)
16	Alkesh A. S.	(India)	MF	20 April 2004 (age 22)
18	Muhammed Jasim	(India)	MF	19 April 2005 (age 21)
30	Ebindas Yesudasan	(India)	MF	19 April 2005 (age 21)
80	Roshan Gigi	(India)	MF	1 October 2000 (age 26)
Forwards
9	Muhammed Ajsal	(India)	FW	28 March 2003 (age 23)
11	Mohammed Aimen	(India)	FW	20 January 2003 (age 23)
15	Subha Ghosh	(India)	FW	22 December 2000 (age 25)

=== Super Cup Squad ===
No.	Name	Nationality	Position(s)	Date of Birth (Age)
Goalkeepers
1	Karanjit Singh	(India)	GK	8 January 1986 (age 40)
13	Prabhsukhan Singh Gill	(India)	GK	2 January 2001 (age 25)
31	Sachin Suresh	(India)	GK	18 January 2001 (age 25)
78	Muheet Shabir	(India)	GK	7 August 2001 (age 25)
Defenders
3	Sandeep Singh	(India)	CB/LB/RB	1 March 1995 (age 31)
4	Ruivah Hormipam	(India)	CB	25 January 2001 (age 25)
5	Tejas Krishna S	(India)	DF	9 June 2001 (age 25)
14	Jessel Carneiro (Captain)	(India)	LB	14 July 1990 (age 36)
21	Bijoy Varghese	(India)	CB	14 March 2000 (age 26)
22	Nishu Kumar	(India)	RB/LB	5 October 1997 (age 29)
23	Víctor Mongil	(Spain)	CB/CDM	21 July 1992 (age 34)
55	Marko Lešković	(Croatia)	CB	27 April 1991 (age 35)
–	Muhammed Saheef	(India)	CB	7 February 2003 (age 23)
Midfielders
6	Danish Farooq Bhat	(India)	LM	9 May 1996 (age 30)
8	Ayush Adhikari	(India)	CM	30 July 2000 (age 26)
25	Jeakson Singh	(India)	CDM/CB	21 June 2001 (age 25)
32	Mohammed Azhar	(India)	CM	20 January 2003 (age 23)
33	Vibin Mohanan	(India)	CM	6 February 2003 (age 23)
77	Ivan Kalyuzhnyi	(Ukraine)	CM	21 January 1998 (age 28)
Forwards
9	Dimitrios Diamantakos	(Greece)	ST	5 March 1993 (age 33)
17	Rahul K. P.	(India)	RW/CF	16 March 2000 (age 26)
18	Sahal Samad	(India)	LW/CM/AM	1 April 1997 (age 29)
19	Mohammed Aimen	(India)	CF	20 January 2003 (age 23)
27	Saurav Mandal	(India)	LW/LM	6 November 2000 (age 26)
28	Nihal Sudeesh	(India)	RW	18 June 2001 (age 25)
30	Bidyashagar Singh	(India)	CF	11 March 1998 (age 28)
45	Sreekuttan M S	(India)	CF	30 November 2004 (age 21)
81	Bryce Miranda	(India)	LW	23 September 1999 (age 27)
99	Apostolos Giannou	(Australia)	ST	25 January 1990 (age 36)

== Transfers ==
=== Transfers In ===
Date	Player	Position	No.	Last Club	Fee	Ref.
15 June 2022	(India) Bryce Miranda	LW	81	(India) Churchill Brothers FC Goa	Undisclosed fee	
28 June 2022	(India) Saurav Mandal	LM	27	(India) Churchill Brothers FC Goa	Undisclosed fee	
8 July 2022	(Australia) Apostolos Giannou	ST	99	(Australia) Macarthur FC	Free transfer	
13 July 2022	(Spain) Víctor Mongil	CB	23	(India) Odisha FC	Free transfer	
18 July 2022	(Ukraine) Ivan Kalyuzhnyi	CM	77	(Ukraine) FC Oleksandriya	Loan transfer	
17 August 2022	(India) Bidyashagar Singh	CF	30	(India) Bengaluru FC	Loan transfer	
25 August 2022	(Greece) Dimitrios Diamantakos	CF	9	(Croatia) HNK Hajduk Split	Free transfer	
31 January 2023	(India) Danish Farooq Bhat	LM	6	(India) Bengaluru FC	Undisclosed fee	

=== Loan Returns ===
Position	No.	Player	From
CF	49	(India) Subha Ghosh	(India) East Bengal
CF	23	(India) Naorem Mahesh Singh	(India) East Bengal
RW	33	(India) Sreekuttan VS	(India) Gokulam Kerala
CB	26	(India) Abdul Hakku	(India) Gokulam Kerala
RW	22	(India) Seityasen Singh	(India) Hyderabad

=== Promoted from Kerala Blasters FC Reserves ===
No.	Name	Nationality	Position(s)	Date of Birth (Age)	Ref.
28	Nihal Sudeesh	(India)	RW	18 June 2001 (age 25)	
33	Vibin Mohanan	(India)	CM	6 February 2003 (age 23)	
19	Mohammed Aimen	(India)	FW	20 January 2003 (age 23)	
32	Mohammed Azhar	(India)	MF	20 January 2003 (age 23)	
2	Muhammed Saheef	(India)	DF	7 February 2003 (age 23)	
9	Muhammad Ajsal	(India)	FW	28 March 2003 (age 23)	

=== Contract Extensions ===
No	Player	Position	Contract Till	Ref.
21	(India) Bijoy Varghese	CB	2025	
25	(India) Jeakson Singh	CDM	2025	
55	(Croatia) Marko Lešković	CB	2024	
13	(India) Prabhsukhan Gill	GK	2024	
1	(India) Karanjit Singh	GK	2023	
3	(India) Sandeep Singh	CB	2025	
20	(Uruguay) Adrián Luna	AM	2024	

=== Loan Outs ===
Position	No.	Player	To	Ref.
LB	19	(India) Denechandra Meitei	(India) Odisha FC	
CM	11	(India) Givson Singh	(India) Chennaiyin FC	

=== Transfers Out ===
Exit Date	Player	Position	No.	To	Fee	Ref.
31 May 2022	(Spain) Álvaro Vázquez	ST	99	(India) FC Goa	Free transfer	
1 June 2022	(India) Vincy Barretto	RW	47	(India) Chennaiyin FC	Undisclosed fee	
2 June 2022	(Bhutan) Chencho Gyeltshen	FW/LW	77	(Bhutan) Paro FC	Free transfer	
3 June 2022	(India) Albino Gomes	GK	32	(India) Churchill Brothers FC Goa	End of contract	
3 June 2022	(India) Seityasen Singh	RW/RM	22	TBD	End of contract	
24 June 2022	(Bosnia and Herzegovina) Enes Sipović	CB	2	(Kuwait) Al-Jahra SC	Free transfer	
4 July 2022	(India) Sanjeev Stalin	LB/LW	15	(India) Mumbai City FC	Undisclosed fee	
11 July 2022	(Argentina) Jorge Pereyra Díaz	ST	30	(India) Mumbai City FC	End of loan period	
3 August 2022	(India) Naorem Mahesh Singh	CF	23	(India) East Bengal Club	Undisclosed fee	
29 August 2022	(India) Sreekuttan VS	RW/ST	33	(India) Gokulam Kerala FC	End of contract	
29 August 2022	(India) Abdul Hakku	CB	24	(India) Real Kashmir FC	End of contract	
29 August 2022	(India) Anil Gaonkar	CF	37	(Bhutan) FC Takin	End of contract	
4 September 2022	(India) Subha Ghosh	CF	49	(India) Gokulam Kerala	Contract terminated	
19 September 2022	(India) Prasanth Mohan	RW/RM/RB	24	(India) Chennaiyin FC	Contract terminated	
29 December 2022	(India) Puitea	CM/RW/CDM	7	(India) ATK Mohun Bagan FC	Undisclosed fee	

== Management ==
As of 4 August 2022

Role	Name	Refs.
Head coach/Manager	(Serbia) Ivan Vukomanović	
Assistant coach	(Belgium) Frank Dauwen	
Assistant coach	(India) Ishfaq Ahmed	
Strength and conditioning Coach	(Belgium) Werner Martens	
Goalkeeping coach	(Serbia) Slaven Progovecki	
Reserves and U18 Head Coach	(India) T. G. Purushothaman	
Academy & Women's Team Director	(India) Rajah Rizwan	
Scouting Head	(India) Ishfaq Ahmed	

== Pre-season and friendlies ==
Shortly after announcing their fixtures in the Durand Cup, on 21 July 2022, the Blasters announced the fixtures of their friendly matches against three UAE clubs after announcing their plans to begin their pre-season preparations in UAE. They cancelled all of their friendlies in UAE on 16 August 2022 after FIFA suspended AIFF due to “third party intervention”. On 27 August, FIFA revoked the ban on AIFF, and the Blasters announced a friendly match against the Emirati club Al Jazira Al Hamra to be played on 28 August, just one day after the ban was lifted by FIFA.

Note: The Blasters' unofficial friendly match results are not included.

Win Draw Loss Void

~~20 August 2022~~ Friendly	(United Arab Emirates) Al-Nasr	Cancelled	(India) Kerala Blasters	Dubai, United Arab Emirates
TBA		Match Cancelled		Stadium: Al Maktoum Stadium
Note: The match was called-off due to ban imposed by FIFA on AIFF in August 2022.

~~25 August 2022~~ Friendly	(United Arab Emirates) Dibba Al Fujairah	Cancelled	(India) Kerala Blasters	Fujairah, United Arab Emirates
TBA		Match Cancelled		Stadium: Dibba Stadium
Note: The match was called-off due to ban imposed by FIFA on AIFF in August 2022.

~~28 August 2022~~ Friendly	(United Arab Emirates) Hatta	Cancelled	(India) Kerala Blasters	Hatta, United Arab Emirates
TBA		Match Cancelled		Stadium: Hamdan Bin Rashid Stadium
Note: The match was called-off due to ban imposed by FIFA on AIFF in August 2022.

28 August 2022 Friendly	(United Arab Emirates) Al Jazira Al Hamra Club	1–5	(India) Kerala Blasters	Ras al Khaimah, United Arab Emirates
20:30 IST	TBC		Rahul; Mandal; Sahal; Diamantakos; Carneiro	Stadium: Al Jazirah Al Hamra Stadium; Attendance: To be confirmed

28 August 2022 Friendly	(India) Kerala Blasters	3–0	(India) MA College Kothamangalam	Kochi, Kerala
TBC	Lešković; Diamantakos; Mandal	Report		Stadium: Panampilly Nagar Ground; Attendance: Closed doors

== Competitions ==
=== Overview ===
Win Draw Loss

Competition	First match	Last match	Starting round	Final position	Record							
Competition	First match	Last match	Starting round	Final position	Pld	W	D	L	GF	GA	GD	Win %
Durand Cup	19 August 2022	9 September 2022	Group stage	Quarter-finals	5	2	1	2	6	6	+0	40.00
Super Cup	8 April 2023	16 April 2023	Group stage	Group stage	3	1	1	1	4	4	+0	33.33
Super League	7 October 2022	3 March 2023	Matchday 1	5th	21	10	1	10	28	29	−1	47.62
Total					29	13	3	13	38	39	−1	44.83

Last updated: 26 April 2023.
Source: Soccerway

=== Durand Cup ===
Kerala Blasters were drawn in the Group D for the 131st edition of the Durand Cup along with two other ISL sides.

==== Group stage ====
Pos	Team	Pld	W	D	L	GF	GA	GD	Pts	Qualification	ODI	KER	ARG	NEU	SDE
1	Odisha	4	4	0	0	11	0	+11	12	Qualify for the Knockout stage	—	2–0	—	6–0	3–0
2	Kerala Blasters	4	2	1	1	6	3	+3	7	Qualify for the Knockout stage	—	—	2–0	—	—
3	Army Green	4	1	1	2	3	4	−1	4		0–1	—	—	—	0–0
4	NorthEast United (H)	4	1	0	3	3	12	−9	3		0–6	0–3	1–3	—	2–0
5	Sudeva Delhi	4	0	2	2	1	6	−5	2		—	1–1	—	—	—

Source: Sportstar
Rules for classification: 1) points; 2) head-to-head points; 3) head-to-head goal difference; 4) goal difference; 5) number of goals scored; 6) drawing of lots
(H) Hosts

==== Matches ====
Win Draw Loss Void

19 August 2022 Group stage	Sudeva Delhi	1–1	Kerala Blasters	Guwahati, Assam
18:00 IST	Kuki 45' (yellow card) 78'; Basit (yellow card) 85'	Report	Tejas (yellow card) 37'; Ajsal 42'; Jasim (yellow card) 70'	Stadium: Indira Gandhi Athletic Stadium; Attendance: Closed doors

23 August 2022 Group stage	Odisha	2–0	Kerala Blasters	Guwahati, Assam
15:00 IST	Isaac 52'; Crespo 74'	Report	Azhar (yellow card) 66'	Stadium: Indira Gandhi Athletic Stadium; Attendance: Closed doors

27 August 2022 Group stage	NorthEast United	0–3	Kerala Blasters	Guwahati, Assam
18:00 IST	Boro (yellow card) 35'; Gogoi (yellow card) 62'	Report	Aimen 28', 90'; Ajsal 55'; Gaurav (yellow card) 66'; Gigi (yellow card) 81'	Stadium: Indira Gandhi Athletic Stadium; Attendance: Closed doors

31 August 2022 Group stage	Kerala Blasters	2–0	Army Green	Guwahati, Assam
15:00 IST	Aimen 25'; Das 45+3'; Vibin (yellow card) 81'	Report	Chhetri (yellow card) 17'; Lallawmkima (yellow card) 41'	Stadium: Indira Gandhi Athletic Stadium; Attendance: Closed doors

==== Knockout stage ====
9 September 2022 Quarter-final	Mohammedan SC	3–0	Kerala Blasters	Kolkata, West Bengal
18:00 IST	Faiaz 17'; Dauda 59', 84'	Report	Basith (yellow card) 86'; Gigi (yellow card) 89'	Stadium: Vivekananda Yuba Bharati Krirangan; Attendance: Closed doors

=== Indian Super League ===
This season of the Indian Super League was played across the country in home and away formats after two seasons of hosting it in Goa due to the COVID-19 pandemic.

==== League table ====
Pos	Team	Pld	W	D	L	GF	GA	GD	Pts	Qualification
3	ATK Mohun Bagan (W)	20	10	4	6	24	17	+7	34 (Note: Head-to-head points: ATK Mohun Bagan 3, Bengaluru 3. Head-to-head goal difference: ATK Mohun Bagan 0, Bengaluru 0. Head-to-head goal scored: ATK Mohun Bagan 4, Bengaluru 4. Goal difference: ATK Mohun Bagan +7, Bengaluru +4.)	ISL Cup Knockouts, Playoffs for 2023–24 AFC Cup qualifiers (Note: Qualified via winning the 2023 Indian Super League playoffs) and 2023–24 AFC Cup qualifiers (Note: Qualified via winning the Indian club qualifiers for 2023–24 AFC competitions) (Note: It was announced by AIFF that 2022-23 will be the last season in which the reigning Cup Winners will wear the Champions badge. Starting from 2023-24 season it will be the reigning League Shield Winners that will wear the Champions badge thereafter.)
4	Bengaluru	20	11	1	8	27	23	+4	34	ISL Cup Knockouts
5	Kerala Blasters	20	10	1	9	28	28	0	31	ISL Cup Knockouts
6	Odisha	20	9	3	8	30	32	−2	30	ISL Cup Knockouts, Playoffs for 2023–24 AFC Cup group stage (Note: Qualified via winning the 2023 Super Cup) and 2023–24 AFC Cup group stage (Note: Qualified via winning the Indian club qualifiers for 2023–24 AFC competitions)
7	Goa	20	8	3	9	36	35	+1	27 (Note: Head-to-head points: Goa 3, Chennaiyin 3. Head-to-head goal difference: Goa +1, Chennaiyin -1.)	

Source: Indian Super League
Rules for classification: 1) points; 2) head-to-head points; 3) head-to-head goal difference; 4) head-to-head goals scored; 5) goal difference; 6) number of goals scored; 7) fair play ranking; 8) drawing of lots
(W) ISL Cup winners

==== League results by round ====
Match	1	2	3	4	5	6	7	8	9	10	11	12	13	14	15	16	17	18	19	20
Ground	H	H	A	H	A	H	A	A	H	A	H	H	A	A	H	A	H	A	A	H
Result	W	L	L	L	W	W	W	W	W	D	W	W	L	L	W	L	W	L	L	L
League Position	1	7	9	9	7	5	3	5	4	4	3	3	3	3	3	3	3	3	5	5

Updated to match(es) played on 26 February 2023. Source: Indian Super League
A = Away; H = Home; W = Win; D = Draw; L = Loss

===== Matches =====
Note: Indian Super League announced the fixtures for the 2022–23 season on 1 September 2022 with the fixture between the Blasters and East Bengal on 7 October serving as the opening match of the season.

7 October 2022 1	Kerala Blasters	3–1	East Bengal	Kochi, Kerala
19:30 IST	Luna 72'; Ruivah (yellow card) 78'; Kalyuzhnyi 82', 89'	Report	Chungnunga (yellow card) 60'; Ankit Mukherjee (yellow card) 63'; Lima 88'	Stadium: Jawaharlal Nehru Stadium; Attendance: 34,978; Referee: C. R. Srikrishna; Man of the Match: Ivan Kalyuzhnyi (Kerala Blasters)

16 October 2022 2	Kerala Blasters	2–5	ATK Mohun Bagan	Kochi, Kerala
19:30 IST	Kalyuzhnyi 6'; Khabra (yellow card) 43'; Rahul 81'	Report	Petratos 26', 62', 90+2'; Kauko 38'; Kaith 79'; Rodrigues 88'	Stadium: Jawaharlal Nehru Stadium; Attendance: 34,984; Referee: R. Venkatesh; Man of the Match: Dimitri Petratos (ATK Mohun Bagan)

23 October 2022 3	Odisha	2–1	Kerala Blasters	Bhubaneswar, Odisha
19:30 IST	Mawihmingthanga 54'; Martín 86'	Report	Khabra 35'; Kalyuzhnyi (yellow card) 42'; Mongil (yellow card) 88'	Stadium: Kalinga Stadium; Attendance: 5,217; Referee: L Priyobarta Singh; Man of the Match: Pedro Martín (Odisha)

28 October 2022 4	Kerala Blasters	0–2	Mumbai City	Kochi, Kerala
19:30 IST	Kalyuzhnyi (yellow card) 83'	Report	Mehtab Singh 21'; Díaz 31'; Noguera (yellow card) 72'	Stadium: Jawaharlal Nehru Stadium; Attendance: 33,121; Referee: Aditya Purkayastha; Man of the Match: Mehtab Singh (Mumbai City)

5 November 2022 5	NorthEast United	0–3	Kerala Blasters	Guwahati, Assam
19:30 IST	Rochharzela (yellow card) 89'	Report	Nishu (yellow card) 36'; Diamantakos 56'; Sahal 85', 90+5'	Stadium: Indira Gandhi Athletic Stadium; Attendance: 4,867; Referee: Crystal John; Man of the Match: Rahul KP (Kerala Blasters)

12 November 2022 6	Kerala Blasters	3–1	Goa	Kochi, Kerala
19:30 IST	Lešković (yellow card) 27'; Luna 42'; Diamantakos 45+1'; Sandeep (yellow card) 50'; Kaliuzhnyi 52'	Report	Ali (yellow card) 45'; Sadaoui 67'	Stadium: Jawaharlal Nehru Stadium; Attendance: 29,347; Referee: Rahul Kumar Gupta; Man of the Match: Ivan Kaliuzhnyi (Kerala Blasters)

19 November 2022 7	Hyderabad	0–1	Kerala Blasters	Hyderabad, Telangana
19:30 IST	Jeakson (yellow card) 69'; Mandal (yellow card) 89'; Rahul (yellow card) 90'; Gill (yellow card) 90+3'	Report	Diamantakos 18'; Chinglensana (yellow card) 77'	Stadium: G. M. C. Balayogi Athletic Stadium; Attendance: 11,834; Referee: Pranjal Banerjee; Man of the Match: Ivan Kalyuzhnyi (Kerala Blasters)

4 December 2022 8	Jamshedpur	0–1	Kerala Blasters	Jamshedpur, Jharkhand
19:30 IST	Chukwu (yellow card) 31'	Report	Diamantakos 17'; Luna (yellow card) 45+2'; Nishu (yellow card) 67'; Sandeep (yellow card) 72'	Stadium: JRD Tata Sports Complex; Attendance: 16,417; Referee: Tejas Nagvenkar; Man of the Match: Marko Lešković (Kerala Blasters)

11 December 2022 9	Kerala Blasters	3–2	Bengaluru	Kochi, Kerala
19:30 IST	Lešković 25'; Diamantakos 43'; Giannou 70'; Gill (yellow card) 90+4'	Report	Chhetri 14' (pen.); Jhingan (yellow card) 24'; Hernández 81'	Stadium: Jawaharlal Nehru Stadium; Attendance: 25,184; Referee: I Jamal Mohamed; Man of the Match: Dimitrios Diamantakos (Kerala Blasters)

19 December 2022 10	Chennaiyin	1–1	Kerala Blasters	Chennai, Tamil Nadu
19:30 IST	Barretto 48'; Das (yellow card) 90+6'	Report	Sahal 23'; Rahul (yellow card) 69'; Kalyuzhnyi (yellow card) 72'	Stadium: Jawaharlal Nehru Stadium; Attendance: 11,132; Referee: Harish Kundu; Man of the Match: Adrián Luna (Kerala Blasters)

26 December 2022 11	Kerala Blasters	1–0	Odisha	Kochi, Kerala
19:30 IST	Gill (yellow card) 30'; Sandeep (yellow card) 30', (goal) 86'; Lešković (yellow card) 43'; Rahul (yellow card) 45+1'; Luna (yellow card) 76'; Kalyuzhnyi (yellow card) 90+6'	Report	Nanda (yellow card) 30'; Gahlot (yellow card) 82'	Stadium: Jawaharlal Nehru Stadium; Attendance: 31,712; Referee: Pratik Mondal; Man of the Match: Sandeep Singh (Kerala Blasters)

3 January 2023 12	Kerala Blasters	3–1	Jamshedpur	Kochi, Kerala
19:30 IST	Giannou 9'; Diamantakos 31' (pen.); Carneiro (yellow card) 45+1'; Sandeep (yellow card) 54'; Luna 65'	Report	Chukwu 17'; Choudhary (yellow card) 90+3'	Stadium: Jawaharlal Nehru Stadium; Attendance: 24,117; Referee: Ashwin; Man of the Match: Adrián Luna (Kerala Blasters)

8 January 2023 13	Mumbai City	4–0	Kerala Blasters	Mumbai, Maharashtra
19:30 IST	Díaz 4', 22', (yellow card) 35'; Greg Stewart 10'; Ahmed Jahouh (yellow card) 12'; Bipin 16'	Report	Rahul (yellow card) 45'; Khabra (yellow card) 76'	Stadium: Mumbai Football Arena; Attendance: 6,407; Referee: C. R. Srikrishna; Man of the Match: Jorge Pereyra Díaz (Mumbai City)

22 January 2023 14	Goa	3–1	Kerala Blasters	Margao, Goa
19:30 IST	Guarrotxena 35' (pen.); Sadaoui 43'; Fernandes (yellow card) 50'; Tlang 69'	Report	Jeakson (yellow card) 36'; Diamantakos 51'; Luna (yellow card) 61'; Ruivah (yellow card) 61'; Kalyuzhnyi (yellow card) 85'	Stadium: Fatorda Stadium; Attendance: 8,608; Referee: C. R. Srikrishna; Man of the Match: Brandon Fernandes (Goa)

29 January 2023 15	Kerala Blasters	2–0	NorthEast United	Kochi, Kerala
19:30 IST	Diamantakos (yellow card) 9', (goal) 42', 44'; Rahul (yellow card) 52'	Report	Saji (yellow card) 6'; Evans (yellow card) 32'; Gurjinder (yellow card) 33'	Stadium: Jawaharlal Nehru Stadium; Attendance: 18,018; Referee: Umesh Bora; Man of the Match: Dimitrios Diamantakos (Kerala Blasters)

3 February 2023 16	East Bengal	1–0	Kerala Blasters	Kolkata, West Bengal
19:30 IST	Lima (yellow card) 45'; Rahman (yellow card) 48' (yellow-red card) 90+5'; Suhair (yellow card) 70'; Silva 77'; Passi (yellow card) 86'	Report	Jeakson (yellow card) 53'; Khabra (yellow card) 58'; Nishu (yellow card) 90+3'	Stadium: Vivekananda Yuba Bharati Krirangan; Attendance: 2,575; Referee: Ashwin; Man of the Match: Cleiton Silva (East Bengal)

7 February 2023 17	Kerala Blasters	2–1	Chennaiyin	Kochi, Kerala
19:30 IST	Luna 38'; Sahal (yellow card) 56'; Rahul 64'	Report	Khayati 2'	Stadium: Jawaharlal Nehru Stadium; Attendance: 21,049; Referee: Crystal John; Man of the Match: Adrián Luna (Kerala Blasters)

11 February 2023 18	Bengaluru	1–0	Kerala Blasters	Bangalore, Karnataka
19:30 IST	Shrivas (yellow card) 14'; Krishna 32'. (yellow card) 70'; Sandhu (yellow card) 79'	Report	Kalyuzhnyi (yellow card) 42'; Rahul (yellow card) 73'; Luna (yellow card) 75'	Stadium: Sree Kanteerava Stadium; Attendance: 28,001; Referee: Tejas Nagvenkar; Man of the Match: Rohit Kumar (Bengaluru FC)

18 February 2023 19	ATK Mohun Bagan	2–1	Kerala Blasters	Kolkata, West Bengal
19:30 IST	Bose (yellow card) 21'; McHugh 23', 71'	Report	Diamantakos 16', (yellow card) 49'; Rahul (yellow card) 26' (yellow-red card) 64'	Stadium: Vivekananda Yuba Bharati Krirangan; Referee: Rahul Kumar Gupta; Man of the Match: Carl McHugh (ATK Mohun Bagan)

26 February 2023 20	Kerala Blasters	0–1	Hyderabad	Kochi, Kerala
19:30 IST	Mohanan (yellow card) 41'; Kalyuzhnyi (yellow card) 51'	Report	Poojari (yellow card) 17'; Herrera 29'	Stadium: Jawaharlal Nehru Stadium; Attendance: 25,743; Referee: R Venkatesh; Man of the Match: Joel Chianese (Hyderabad)

==== Knockout stage ====
3 March 2023 Knockout stage	Bengaluru	1–0 (a.e.t.)	Kerala Blasters	Bangalore, Karnataka
19:30 IST	Chhetri 96'	Report	Lešković (yellow card) 64'	Stadium: Sree Kanteerava Stadium; Attendance: 20,301; Referee: Crystal John; Man of the Match: Sunil Chhetri (Kerala Blasters)
Note: The Blasters forfeited the match in the 96th minute following the controversy around the legitimacy of the goal scored by Bengaluru.

=== Super Cup ===
Kerala Blasters were drawn in the Group A of the 3rd edition of the Super Cup on 7 March in the same group alongside the arch-rivals Bengaluru FC, just four days after the controversial knockout stage match between both the sides in the league phase.

==== Group stage ====
Pos	Team	Pld	W	D	L	GF	GA	GD	Pts		BEN	SRD	KER	RGP
1	Bengaluru	3	1	2	0	4	2	+2	5	Advance to knockout stage	—	1–1	1–1	—
2	Sreenidi Deccan	3	1	1	1	3	2	+1	4 (Note: Head-to-head points: Sreenidi Deccan 3, Kerala Blasters 0.)		—	—	2–0	—
3	Kerala Blasters	3	1	1	1	4	4	0	4		—	—	—	3–1
4	Punjab	3	1	0	2	2	5	−3	3		0–2	1–0	—	—

Source: AIFF
Rules for classification: 1) points; 2) head-to-head points; 3) head-to-head goal difference; 4) goal difference; 5) number of goals scored; 6) drawing of lots

==== Matches ====
8 April 2023 1	Kerala Blasters	3–1	RoundGlass Punjab	Kozhikode, Kerala
20:30 IST	Diamantakos 41' (pen.); Nishu 54'; Rahul 90+5'	Report	Brandon (yellow card) 50'; Mera (yellow card) 65'; Krishananda 73'	Stadium: EMS Stadium; Attendance: 11, 562; Referee: Tejas Nagvenkar; Man of the Match: Nishu Kumar (Kerala Blasters)

12 April 2023 2	Sreenidi Deccan	2–0	Kerala Blasters	Kozhikode, Kerala
17:00 IST	Hassan 17'; Castañeda 44'; Dinesh (yellow card) 64'	Report	Adhikari (yellow card) 16'; Jeakson (yellow card) 59'; Diamantakos (yellow card) 89'	Stadium: EMS Stadium; Attendance: 7,458; Referee: Aditya Purkayastha; Man of the Match: Konsam Phalguni Singh (Sreenidi Deccan)

16 April 2023 3	Bengaluru	1–1	Kerala Blasters	Kozhikode, Kerala
20:30 IST	Krishna 23', (yellow card) 45'	Report	Lešković (yellow card) 35'; Diamantakos 77'	Stadium: EMS Stadium; Attendance: 22, 565; Referee: Rahul Kumar Gupta; Man of the Match: Javi Hernández (Bengaluru FC)

== Statistics ==
All stats are correct as of 16 April 2023

=== Squad appearances and goals ===
Note: Kerala Blasters fielded their reserve side as their first team for the Durand Cup. As a result, the lists below include the stats of players who featured for the club in different sections of the ISL and the Durand Cup.

==== Indian Super League and Indian Super Cup ====
No.	Pos	Nat	Player	Total		Super League		Super Cup	
No.	Pos	Nat	Player	Apps	Goals	Apps	Goals	Apps	Goals
Goalkeepers
1	GK	(India) IND	Karanjit Singh	2	0	2	0	0	0
13	GK	(India) IND	Prabhsukhan Gill	19	0	19	0	0	0
31	GK	(India) IND	Sachin Suresh	3	0	0	0	3	0
78	GK	(India) IND	Muheet Shabir	0	0	0	0	0	0
Defenders
3	DF	(India) IND	Sandeep Singh	9	1	9	1	0	0
4	DF	(India) IND	Ruivah Hormipam	22	0	19+1	0	1+1	0
5	DF	(India) IND	Tejas Krishna S	0	0	0	0	0	0
10	DF	(India) IND	Harmanjot Khabra	7	1	7	1	0	0
14	DF	(India) IND	Jessel Carneiro	19	0	14+5	0	0	0
21	DF	(India) IND	Bijoy Varghese	2	0	0+1	0	1	0
22	DF	(India) IND	Nishu Kumar	20	1	11+6	0	3	1
23	DF	(Spain) ESP	Víctor Mongil	22	0	9+10	0	2+1	0
55	DF	(Croatia) CRO	Marko Lešković	18	1	14+1	1	2+1	0
2	DF	(India) IND	Muhammed Saheef	2	0	0	0	1+1	0
Midfielders
6	MF	(India) IND	Danish Farooq	9	0	1+5	0	2+1	0
8	MF	(India) IND	Ayush Adhikari	9	0	1+6	0	2	0
11	MF	(India) IND	Givson Singh	0	0	0	0	0	0
18	MF	(India) IND	Sahal Abdul Samad	23	3	16+4	3	1+2	0
20	MF	(Uruguay) URU	Adrián Luna	20	4	20	4	0	0
25	MF	(India) IND	Jeakson Singh	23	0	20	0	1+2	0
27	MF	(India) IND	Saurav Mandal	15	0	2+11	0	2	0
28	MF	(India) IND	Nihal Sudeesh	6	0	0+5	0	0+1	0
33	MF	(India) IND	Vibin Mohanan	6	0	2+2	0	2	0
77	MF	(Ukraine) UKR	Ivan Kalyuzhnyi	19	4	15+3	4	1	0
81	MF	(India) IND	Bryce Miranda	14	0	4+8	0	1+1	0
—	MF	(India) IND	Muhammed Azhar	0	0	0	0	0	0
Forwards
9	FW	(Greece) GRE	Dimitrios Diamantakos	24	12	21	10	3	2
17	MF	(India) IND	Rahul K. P.	22	3	16+3	2	2+1	1
30	FW	(India) IND	Bidyashagar Singh	8	0	0+6	0	0+2	0
45	FW	(India) IND	Sreekuttan M S	0	0	0	0	0	0
99	FW	(Australia) AUS	Apostolos Giannou	20	2	5+12	2	3	0
—	FW	(India) IND	Muhammed Aimen	1	0	0	0	0+1	0
Players who left during the season but made an appearance
7	MF	(India) IND	Puitea	6	0	4+2	0	0	0

==== Durand Cup ====
No.	Pos	Nat	Player	Total		Durand Cup	
No.	Pos	Nat	Player	Apps	Goals	Apps	Goals
Goalkeepers
1	GK	(India) IND	Sachin Suresh	5	0	5	0
13	GK	(India) IND	Muhammed Murshad	0	0	0	0
77	GK	(India) IND	Muhammed Jaseen	0	0	0	0
Defenders
3	DF	(India) IND	Marvaan Hussain	5	0	5	0
5	DF	(India) IND	Tejas Krishna S	5	0	5	0
12	DF	(India) IND	Muhammed Basith	5	0	5	0
19	DF	(India) IND	Sherin Salari	0	0	0	0
20	DF	(India) IND	Abhiram K	0	0	0	0
33	DF	(India) IND	Muhammed Saheef	1	0	0+1	0
55	DF	(India) IND	Adhil Ashraf	4	0	0+4	0
66	DF	(India) IND	Aritra Das	5	1	5	1
Midfielders
6	MF	(India) IND	Muhammed Azhar	5	0	5	0
8	MF	(India) IND	Vibin Mohanan	5	0	5	0
10	MF	(India) IND	Gaurav Kankonkar	5	0	5	0
16	MF	(India) IND	Alkesh A. S.	3	0	1+2	0
18	MF	(India) IND	Muhammed Jasim	5	0	0+5	0
30	MF	(India) IND	Ebindas Yesudasan	4	0	0+4	0
80	MF	(India) IND	Roshan Gigi	5	0	5	0
Forwards
9	FW	(India) IND	Muhammed Ajsal	5	2	5	2
11	FW	(India) IND	Muhammed Aimen	5	3	5	3
15	FW	(India) IND	Subha Ghosh	2	0	0+2	0

=== Squad statistics ===
Factors	League	Durand Cup	Super Cup	Total
Games Played	21	5	3	29
Games Won	10	2	1	13
Games Drawn	1	1	1	3
Games Lost	10	2	1	13
Goals Scored	28	6	4	38
Goals Conceded	29	6	4	39
Goal Difference	-1	0	0	-1
Clean Sheets	5	2	0	7
Goals by Substitutes	6	0	1	7
Yellow Cards	46	8	4	58
Red Cards	1	0	0	1

Players Used: 41

=== Goalscorers ===
Rank	Name	No.	Pos.	League	Durand Cup	Super Cup	Total
1	(Greece) Dimitrios Diamantakos	9	FW	10	0	2	12
2	(Ukraine) Ivan Kalyuzhnyi	77	MF	4	0	0	4
2	(Uruguay) Adrián Luna	20	MF	4	0	0	4
3	(India) Sahal Abdul Samad	18	MF	3	0	0	3
3	(India) Rahul KP	17	MF	2	0	1	3
3	(India) Mohammed Aimen	11 (Durand Cup)	FW	0	3	0	3
4	(Australia) Apostolos Giannou	99	FW	2	0	0	2
4	(India) Mohammed Ajsal	9 (Durand Cup)	FW	0	2	0	2
5	(India) Harmanjot Khabra	10	DF	1	0	0	1
5	(Croatia) Marko Lešković	55	DF	1	0	0	1
5	(India) Sandeep Singh	3	DF	1	0	0	1
5	(India) Nishu Kumar	22	DF	0	0	1	1
5	(India) Aritra Das	66 (Durand Cup)	DF	0	1	0	1
Total				28	6	4	38

Source: Indian Super League

=== Assist ===
Rank	No.	Pos.	Nation	Name	League	Durand Cup	Super Cup	Total
1	20	MF	(Uruguay)	Adrián Luna	6	0	0	6
2	9	FW	(Greece)	Dimitrios Diamantakos	3	0	0	3
2	18	MF	(India)	Sahal Abdul Samad	2	0	1	3
3	81	MF	(India)	Bryce Miranda	2	0	0	2
3	99	FW	(Australia)	Apostolos Giannou	2	0	0	2
3	6 (Durand Cup)	MF	(India)	Mohammed Azhar	0	2	0	2
4	10	DF	(India)	Harmanjot Khabra	1	0	0	1
4	30	FW	(India)	Bidyashagar Singh	1	0	0	1
4	22	DF	(India)	Nishu Kumar	1	0	0	1
4	27	MF	(India)	Saurav Mandal	1	0	0	1
4	17	FW	(India)	Rahul KP	1	0	0	1
4	3	DF	(India)	Sandeep Singh	1	0	0	1
4	77	MF	(Ukraine)	Ivan Kalyuzhnyi	1	0	0	1
4	10 (Durand Cup)	MF	(India)	Gaurav Kankonkar	0	1	0	1
4	8 (Durand Cup)	FW	(India)	Vibin Mohanan	0	1	0	1
4	11 (Durand Cup)	MF	(India)	Mohammed Aimen	0	1	0	1
Total					22	5	1	28

Source: Indian Super League

=== Clean-sheets ===
Rank	Name	No.	League	Durand Cup	Super Cup	Total
1	(India) Prabhsukhan Singh Gill	13	4	0	0	4
2	(India) Sachin Suresh	31 (Durand Cup: 1)	0	2	0	2
3	(India) Karanjit Singh	1	1	0	0	1
Total			5	2	0	7

Source: Indian Super League

=== Disciplinary record ===
No.	Pos.	Nat.	Name	League			Durand Cup			Super Cup			Total		
No.	Pos.	Nat.	Name	Yellow card	Second yellow card	Red card	Yellow card	Second yellow card	Red card	Yellow card	Second yellow card	Red card	Yellow card	Second yellow card	Red card
5 (Durand Cup)	DF	(India)	Tejas Krishna	0	0	0	1	0	0	0	0	0	1	0	0
18 (Durand Cup)	DF	(India)	Muhammed Jasim	0	0	0	1	0	0	0	0	0	1	0	0
10 (Durand Cup)	MF	(India)	Gaurav Kankonkar	0	0	0	1	0	0	0	0	0	1	0	0
80 (Durand Cup)	MF	(India)	Roshan Gigi	0	0	0	2	0	0	0	0	0	2	0	0
6 (Durand Cup)	MF	(India)	Muhammed Azhar	0	0	0	1	0	0	0	0	0	1	0	0
8 (Durand Cup)	MF	(India)	Vibin Mohanan	1	0	0	1	0	0	0	0	0	2	0	0
12 (Durand Cup)	DF	(India)	Muhammed Basith	0	0	0	1	0	0	0	0	0	1	0	0
4	DF	(India)	Hormipam Ruivah	3	0	0	0	0	0	0	0	0	3	0	0
10	DF	(India)	Harmanjot Singh	3	0	0	0	0	0	0	0	0	3	0	0
77	MF	(Ukraine)	Ivan Kalyuzhnyi	7	0	0	0	0	0	0	0	0	7	0	0
23	DF	(Spain)	Víctor Mongil	1	0	0	0	0	0	0	0	0	1	0	0
22	DF	(India)	Nishu Kumar	3	0	0	0	0	0	0	0	0	3	0	0
55	DF	(Croatia)	Marko Lešković	4	0	0	0	0	0	1	0	0	5	0	0
25	MF	(India)	Jeakson Singh	3	0	0	0	0	0	1	0	0	4	0	0
27	MF	(India)	Saurav Mandal	1	0	0	0	0	0	0	0	0	1	0	0
17	MF	(India)	Rahul KP	6	1	0	0	0	0	0	0	0	6	1	0
13	GK	(India)	Prabhsukhan Singh Gill	3	0	0	0	0	0	0	0	0	3	0	0
20	MF	(Uruguay)	Adrián Luna	4	0	0	0	0	0	0	0	0	4	0	0
3	DF	(India)	Sandeep Singh	3	0	0	0	0	0	0	0	0	3	0	0
14	DF	(India)	Jessel Carneiro	1	0	0	0	0	0	0	0	0	1	0	0
9	FW	(Greece)	Dimitrios Diamantakos	2	0	0	0	0	0	1	0	0	3	0	0
18	MF	(India)	Sahal Abdul Samad	1	0	0	0	0	0	0	0	0	1	0	0
8	MF	(India)	Ayush Adhikari	0	0	0	0	0	0	1	0	0	1	0	0
Total				46	1	0	8	0	0	4	0	0	58	1	0

Source: World Football

=== Injury record ===
No.	Pos.	Nat.	Name	Type	Status	Source	Match	Inj. Date	Ret. Date
3	DF	(India)	Sandeep Singh	ankle fracture		KBFC.in	vs FC Goa	22 January 2023	2023–24 season

- Player is injured
- Player has recovered from injury
Last updated: 24 January 2023
Source: Kerala Blasters FC

== Seasonal awards ==
=== Indian Super League ===
- Best Pitch: Kerala Blasters FC (Jawaharlal Nehru Stadium, Kochi)

=== Kerala Blasters ===
- Kerala Blasters Fans' Player of the Season: Adrián Luna.

== Club awards ==
=== Indian Super League ===
==== ISL Fans' Goal of the Week award ====
This is awarded weekly to the players chosen by fans voting at the Indian Super League website.

Week	Nat.	Player	Score	Opponents	Date	% Votes
Week 1	(Uruguay)	Adrián Luna	1–0	East Bengal Club	7 October 2022	47.8%
Week 6	(Ukraine)	Ivan Kalyuzhnyi	3–0	FC Goa	13 November 2022	97.2%
Week 13	(Uruguay)	Adrián Luna	3–1	Jamshedpur FC	3 January 2023	51.6%
Week 19	(Uruguay)	Adrián Luna	1–1	Chennaiyin FC	7 February 2023	52.3%

=== Kerala Blasters ===
==== Kerala Blasters Fans' Player of the Month award ====
Note: This is awarded monthly to the players of Kerala Blasters as chosen by the fans via voting in their social media platforms.

Month	Nat.	Player	Refs.
October	(India)	Rahul K. P.	
November	(India)	Rahul K. P.	
December	(Uruguay)	Adrián Luna	
January	(Uruguay)	Adrián Luna	
February	(Uruguay)	Adrián Luna	

==== Kerala Blasters Fans' Goal of the Month award ====
Note: This is awarded monthly to the players of Kerala Blasters as chosen by the fans via voting in their social media platforms.

Month	Nat.	Player	Score	Opponents	Date	Refs.
October	(Uruguay)	Adrián Luna	1–0	East Bengal Club	7 October 2022	
November	(Ukraine)	Ivan Kalyuzhnyi	3–0	FC Goa	13 November 2022	
December	(Australia)	Apostolos Giannou	3–1	Bengaluru FC	11 December 2023	
January	(Uruguay)	Adrián Luna	3–1	Jamshedpur FC	3 January 2023	
February	(Uruguay)	Adrián Luna	1–1	Chennaiyin FC	7 February 2023	

== See also ==
- Kerala Blasters FC
- List of Kerala Blasters FC seasons
- Indian Super League
- 2022–23 Indian Super League
