= Soundararajan Bangarusamy =

Indian businessman

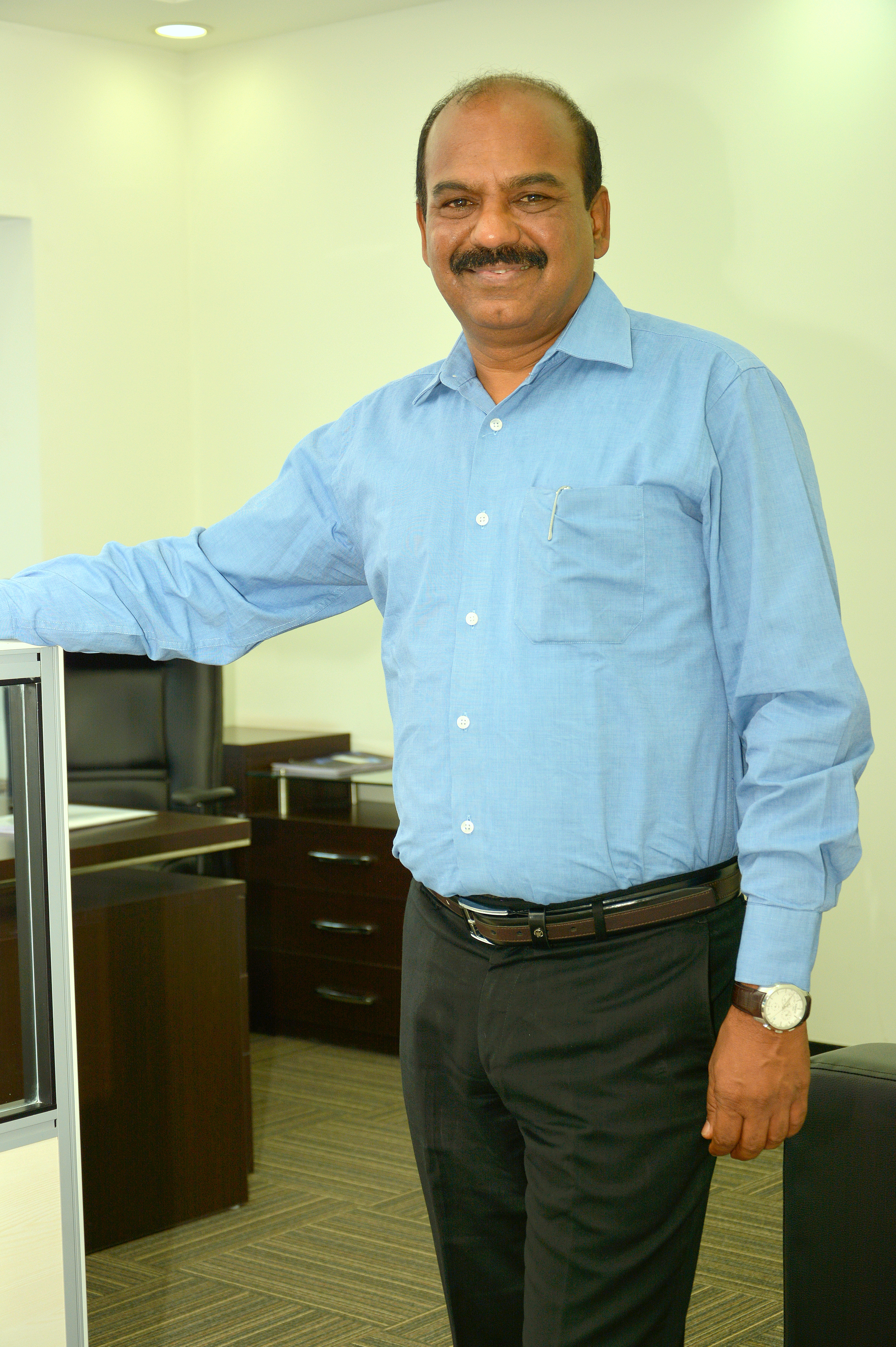
- Born: 12 April 1961 (age 65); Udumalpet
- Occupations: Chairman of Suguna Foods & Suguna Holdings
- Spouse: Vasanthamani
- Children: Aarthi Soundararajan; Vignesh Soundararajan
- Parent(s): Bangarusamy; Kamalam
- Relatives: Sundararajan Bangarusamy (Brother); Manonmani Bangarusamy (Sister)

Soundararajan Bangarusamy is an Indian businessman and the managing director of Suguna Holdings Private Limited (SHPL), the holding company for the Suguna group of companies.

== Personal life ==
Soundararajan is married to Vasantha Mani and has two children, Aarthi Soundararajan and Vignesh Soundararajan both are married. They live in Coimbatore.
