= Saurav Mandal =

Indian footballer

Personal information
- Full name: Saurav Mandal
- Date of birth: 6 November 2000 (age 26)
- Place of birth: Jalandhar, Punjab, India
- Height: 1.75 m (5 ft 9 in)
- Positions: Left winger; right winger

Youth career
- JCT
- 2018: East Bengal

Senior career*
Years	Team	Apps	(Gls)
2018–2019	Rainbow	?	(?)
2019–2020	ATK B	8	(0)
2020–2022	Churchill Brothers	14	(1)
2022–2025	Kerala Blasters	21	(0)
2025	→ Gokulam Kerala (loan)	7	(0)
- * Club domestic league appearances and goals as of 13:30, 12 February 2025 (UTC)

Saurav Mandal (born 6 November 2000) is an Indian professional footballer who plays as a forward for club.

== Club career ==
=== Early life and career ===
Saurav was born in Jalandhar, Punjab on 6 November 2000. He began his youth career in the JCT Football Academy, from where he joined East Bengal's under-18 setup in 2018. He signed his first senior contract with Rainbow AC, whom he represented in the 2018–19 I-League 2nd Division season, and then signed for the ATK Reserves for the 2019–20 I-League 2nd Division season before leaving the latter to sign for Churchill Brothers in 2020.

=== Churchill Brothers ===
In 2020, Saurav signed for the I-League side Churchill Brothers FC Goa ahead of the 2020–21 I-League season. Despite making it to the squad, Saurav failed to make any appearance for the club in his debut season. Saurav played his debut match for Churchill in the 2021–22 I-League season in the match against TRAU FC on 12 March 2022, where he came in as substitute for Asif Ali Molla in the 53rd minute but Churchill end up losing the game 2–0 at full-time. He scored his debut goal on 1 April 2022 against NEROCA FC, where he was a starter and scored the opening goal in the 8th minute of the game as Churchill won the match 2–4.

After playing 14 matches and scoring a single goal, Saurav left the club in 2022.

=== Kerala Blasters ===
On 23 June 2022, the Indian Super League club Kerala Blasters FC announced that they have reached an agreement with Churchill Brothers FC Goa for the transfer of Saurav, with the transfer remaining subject to the medical. On 28 June 2022, the Blasters confirmed that they have signed Mandal on a three-year deal until 2025 for an undisclosed transfer fee. Saurav made his debut for the Blasters on 23 October 2022 in a 2–1 loss against Odisha FC by coming as a substitute in the 87th minute. On 5 November 2022, Sourav made his first start for the club in a 3–0 away win against NorthEast United FC, where provided the first assist for Dimitrios Diamantakos in the 56th minute. He was named in the Blasters squad for the 2023 Indian Super Cup. Sourav played his first match in the first group stage match against RoundGlass Punjab FC from the starting lineup on 8 April 2023, which they won 3–1 at full-time. He was praised for his performance in the match by the media.

== Career statistics ==
=== Club ===
As of 12 February 2025

Club	Season	League			Cup		AFC		Total	
Club	Season	Division	Apps	Goals	Apps	Goals	Apps	Goals	Apps	Goals
ATK Reserves	2019–20	I-League 2nd Division	8	0	0	0	–		8	0
Churchill Brothers	2020–21	I-League	0	0	0	0	–		0	0
Churchill Brothers	2021–22	I-League	14	1	0	0	–		14	1
Churchill Brothers	Total		14	1	0	0	0	0	14	1
Kerala Blasters	2022–23	Indian Super League	13	0	2 (Note: Appearance(s) in Super Cup)	0	–		15	0
Kerala Blasters	2023–24	Indian Super League	8	0	3 (Note: Appearance(s) in Durand Cup)	0	–		11	0
Kerala Blasters	Total		21	0	5	0	0	0	26	0
Gokulam Kerala (loan)	2024–25	I-League	7	0	0	0	–		7	0
Career total			50	1	5	0	0	0	55	1
