= Suguna Purushothaman =

Indian singer

Suguna Purushothaman சுகுணா புருசோத்தமன்
- Born: Suguna Sarasa Chakravarthi; 4 April 1941; Ponvilainthakalathur, Chengalpattu, Madras Presidency, British India
- Died: 25 February 2015 (aged 74) Chennai, Tamil Nadu, India
- Genre: Carnatic music
- Occupations: Vocalist, composer and teacher

Suguna Purushothaman (4 April 1941–25 February 2015) was an Indian Carnatic music vocalist, composer and teacher. She was awarded the Sangeet Natak Akademi Award for Carnatic music vocals in 2010.

Suguna was born in Ponvilainthakalathur in Chengalpattu (now in Tamil Nadu) in 1941. In the 1960s, she received a Central Government scholarship and trained under Musiri Subramania Iyer, alongside students Mani Krishnasamy, Suguna Varadachari, Padma Narayanasamy and Rukmini Ramani. She received special training under the illustrious Semmangudi Srinivasa Iyer. She also learnt layam from the mridangist Thinniyam Venkatrama Iyer, who also introduced her to Musiri Subramania Iyer.

Under the guidance of Shri Thinniyam Venkatrama Iyer, Suguna was inspired to compose and perform difficult Pallavis taking precocious interest in Pallavis in rare talams. Her layam training also enthused her to master the "Dwi Tala Avadhana" maintaining two talams of different gathis simultaneously in two hands while singing Pallavis that match both these talams. For her mastery in this format she was known popularly as "Pallavi Suguna". Her contribution in reviving the practice of singing pallavis in talams like the "Sarabanandanam" and “Simhanandanam” and the Dwitala Pallavis brought her wide acclaim.

From since she was a little child, Suguna was a fan of Mirabai and carried around a doll. She was also a voracious reader from a young age. With the twin influences of music and writing, Suguna naturally turned to composing songs at a young age. One of her earliest compositions was on Sadguru Tyagaraja composed on the banks of Kaveri, near the great composer's samadhi in her teens. As a student of Professor Sambhamurthi at Govt. college of Music, Chennai she started taking avid interest in the lost art of singing complex pallavis. Many of these historical pallavis were set to long talas and required Suguna to create lyrics for the same.

Fuelled by Tamil cinema's appetite for carnatic based songs as well as the freedom movement, there was a new culture of composing in Tamil. Writing new kritis for the carnatic stage however was generally frowned upon and discouraged. It was considered taboo to compose unless one achieved the vision the Trinity of Carnatic music were believed to have been bestowed upon by divine grace. Unfazed by the absence of recent predecessors among woman composers or songwriting tutelage, Suguna started creating compositions for her own satisfaction. She neither performed nor taught these out of deference for the largely accepted tradition of performing established composers’ works.

Her first collection of songs ’Kadambam’ was finally published in the year 1999, two decades after they were composed. The Madras Music Academy recognised her work in creating new music for the carnatic genre in the year 2006, with the ‘Vaggeyakara’ award. She published her second volume of compositions ‘Manolahari’ in 2011. For the Ramayana Dance drama commissioned by the Cleveland Thyagaraja Festival, Suguna composed the songs of 'Ayodhya Kanda’. Featuring the turning point of the epic where the crown prince Rama is banished to the forest, this work represents Suguna's ability to portray dramatic emotions in accessible lyric.

In all she wrote around 200+ compositions across musical forms ranging from swarajati, chauka kala kriti, varnam, ragamalika, thillana and tukkada.

Suguna trained several noted Carnatic musicians including K. Gayathri, Kaushik Lakshminarayanan, Anusha Thyagarajan, Sharanya Krishnan, Karthik Lakshminarayanan and Srinidhi Chidambaram.

Suguna died aged 74 in Chennai, Tamil Nadu on 25 February 2015 following a long battle with cancer. According to Rajeswari Thyagarajan, a family friend and wife of Thyagarajan, the grandson of Musiri Subramania Iyer, "She wanted to listen to something in the hospital. I had, on my mobile phone, Musiri Subramania Iyer's Nadupai in Madhyamavathi and Marivere in Shanmugapriya and her daughter played the songs for her. She opened her eyes for a second, and the end came." She was survived by her husband and two daughters.

Writer Lalitharam paid tribute to Suguna stating, "Suguna had a great flair for layam and could use her hands to keep two different thalams even as she sang. An expert in pallavi singing, she could even render simma nanthana pallavi (128 counts) in a way that appealed to a lay rasika."

== Awards ==
- Sangeetha Choodamani (2004)
- Kalaimamani, (2006)
- Vaggeyakara Award, (2006) from the Madras Music Academy
- Sangeet Natak Akademi Award for Carnatic vocal music (2010)
- Vellore Gopalachariar Award (2012)
