= Musiri Subramania Iyer =

Indian Carnatic classical vocalist

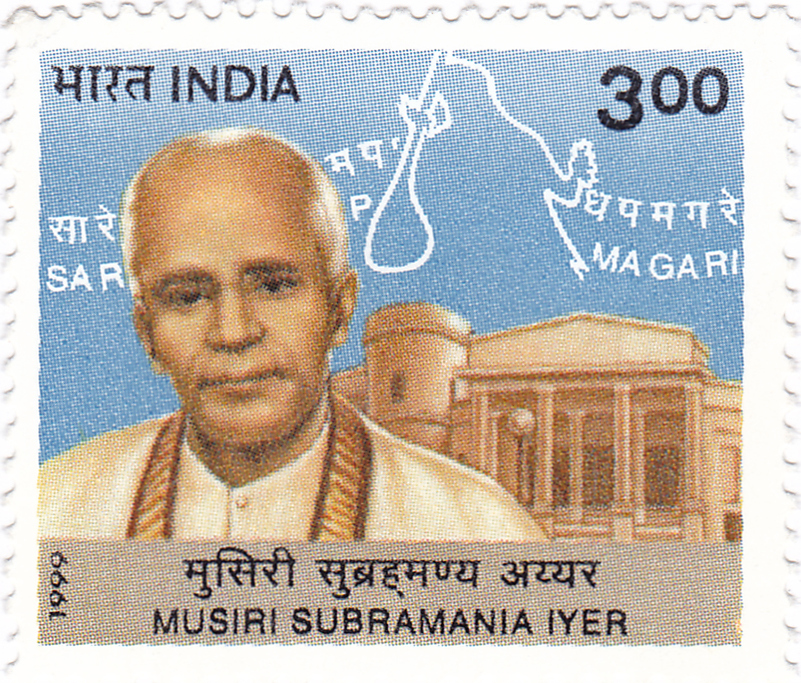
- Iyer on a 1999 stamp of India
- Born: 9 April 1899; Bommalapalayam, Trichy district, Tamil Nadu
- Died: 25 March 1975 (aged 75)
- Occupation: Carnatic Vocalist
- Spouse: Nagalakshmi
- Parent(s): Sankara Sastri, Seethalakshmi

Musiri Subramanian Iyer (9 April 1899 – 25 March 1975) was a Carnatic vocalist whose stage performing career spanned the 1920s to the 1940s. After retirement from the stage, he remained an iconic figure in Carnatic music as a dedicated teacher and leader in the Carnatic community. His bhava-laden renditions of Carnatic songs have become the measuring stick for generations of Carnatic vocalists. Musiri Subramania Iyer is considered one of the giants of Carnatic music in the twentieth century.

== Early life and career ==
Musiri Subramania Iyer was born in Bommalapalayam in the Trichy district of Tamil Nadu. His father, Sankara Sastry was a Sanskrit pandit. He lost his mother, Seethalakshmi (who had two siblings), as a boy and his sister Rajathi died when she was but a child. His family was poor—in later life Musiri seldom spoke about those early years. He married Nagalakshmi when he was 14 years old.

Musiri Subramania Iyer learned to fluently speak, read and write in English when he was 17. Inspired by the singing of a popular acting star of those days, S. G. Kittappa, he decided to become a musician. Like Kittappa, Musiri had a strong vocal range in the higher octaves, and could imitate the former's hit songs with ease.

Musiri Subramania Iyer's initial training in music was under S. Narayanaswamy Iyer for two years, before moving to Chennai for more serious studies with violinist Karur Chinnaswami Iyer. Due to a lack of time to devote to teaching, Chinnaswami sent him to become the disciple of renowned vocal teacher T.S. Sabhesa Iyer who lived in Purasawalkam. Musiri Subramania Iyer trained with him for 9 years in the guru shishya parampara, learning his guru's particular way of performing neraval that Musiri Subramania Iyer would later become famous for.

He made his debut in Chennai in 1920. His name was announced as "Subramania Iyer of Musiri" and the name stuck. (As per tradition in India, the town the artist hails from is sometimes added as a prefix to ones name, honoring the town while simultaneously giving a distinction of a specific geographical nature to the artist, such as Chembai Vaidyanatha Bhagavatar, etc.) Given that Musiri was not born in Musiri, accounts differ as to why the name Musiri was added to his name. Musiri once stated that it was simply because Musiri was a more well known location than Musiri's home town of Bommalapalayam, and easier to say as a prefix. Whatever the case, Musiri Subramania Iyer was a prolific and expert performer, and within 10 years his reputation as a master musician across India was sealed.

In his career, the popularity of Musiri and his name reached every corner of India. His 78 rpm gramophone records were successful to the point that the audience would sometimes demand he sing songs in the exact way as heard on the record. Beginning with the krithi Nagumomu, everything Musiri recorded were best sellers. Nagumomu was a song that, previous to Musiri, was only sung in the Abheri raga, as India's Trinity composer Tyagaraja is thought to have composed it in Abheri. However, Musiri Subramania Iyer felt that the song sounded more emotional in the Karnataka Devagandhari raga, (a similar but subtly different raga) and he sang and recorded Nagumomu with Karnataka Devagandhari. Carnatic music is an exacting music that places large importance on tradition. Therefore, Musiri Subramania Iyer's rendition of the song in a different raga than it was originally written caused outrage in many Carnatic musical purists. But Musiri stuck to his decision. Given that Musiri was a devotee of Tyagaraja, taking liberty with Tyagaraja's song was out of freedom of spontaneous expression and not out of irreverence.

As a point of fact, Nagumomu sounded so suited to Karnataka Devagandhari raga that musicians began to perform it in the "Musiri Subramania Iyer way", artists such as Bangalore Nagarathnamma, M. S. Subbulakshmi, and Bhanumathi Ramakrishna. Other songs that became popular and became recognizable through Musuri's signature touch were Enta vetukondu in Saraswathi Manohari raga, Enthu daginado in todi raga, Tiruvadi caranam in Kambhoji, Enraikki shiva kripai in Mukhari, and Vritta shenjadai ada, a ragamala.

Musiri Subramania Iyer acted in the role of Sant Tukaram in the eponymous film. Though the film is out of print, Musiri Subramania Iyer 's songs in the film have stood the test of time. Musiri Subramania Iyer did not like acting in the film, citing that acting with women, make up and bright lights made him uncomfortable. Musiri Subramania Iyer 's guru also warned him against acting in the film, knowing that Musiri Subramania Iyer had struggled with lung illness in the past, and the damp climate in Coimbatore might affect his health. For financial reasons, Musiri accepted the acting part. The exertions he underwent during the making of the film is thought to have resulted in lifelong lung trouble for Musiri Subramania Iyer, forcing his early retirement from live performance in 1945 at 46 years of age.

Though retired from the concert circuit, Musiri Subramania Iyer was active in many Carnatic music affairs throughout India. He was appointed as the first principal of the Central College of Carnatic Music, Chennai in 1949. During his tenure, he influenced a whole generation of musicians, retiring in 1965. He was also the Honorary Secretary and Treasurer of Sri Tyagaraja Brahma Mahotsava Sabha, and was responsible for organizing the annual aradhana of Tyagaraja's passing, at his samādhi in Thiruvaiyaru. The annual celebration of Tyagaraja's music is the largest musical gathering in India, and continues to this day. Musiri Subramania Iyer is also credited for his key role in the unification of various factions associated with the Aradhana.

"Musiri Subramania Iyer was also known for his sense of humor. A single anecdote, which he himself was fond of repeating, would suffice. Once, Musiri Subramania Iyer and several other vidwans had assembled at a village for a wedding. While playing cards in the afternoon, Musiri Subramania Iyer felt thirsty and woke up his host's cook and asked for some warm water. The old woman, annoyed at having been disturbed in her siesta, muttered loud enough for him to hear "Does he think he is M. S. Subbulakshmi? Why does he need warm water?"

— The Hindu, Musiri Subramania Iyer for Bhava

In another instance, during a function, Ganesan Iyer, a leading lawyer during that time in Dindukkal also an ardent Karnatic rasika happened to sing in the presence of Musiri Subramania Iyeri. After he completed his song, someone had asked Musiri Subramania Iyer to rate the performance. Not quite impressed by the performance, Musiri Subramania Iyer wittily said his singing was comparable to how Musiri Subramania Iyer would have performed as an advocate. This was quoted by Ganesan Iyer on many occasions.

== Place in Carnatic music ==
Renowned for his high pitched voice and tonal purity (known in Carnatic music as sruti), Musiri Subramania Iyer was considered a great exponent of bhava, bringing out the full emotional content of each krithi that he sang. His patanthara of several krithis has his special stamp, which can be easily recognized when they are rendered by his disciples. He was a specialist in neraval singing and also vilamba sangitham, a slower tempo song designed to exude tranquility and bring out the full emotional content of the ragas and krithis that he rendered. Semmangudi Srinivasa Iyer, who was a contemporary of Musiri Subramania Iyer, said "Musiri Subramania Iyer brought gauravam (dignity) to our profession." He also heralded Musiri's dedication to bhava by saying "He used to be so lost in bhava that he never thought of evoking any response."

"Bhava was the keynote of his music represented by a leisurely portrayal of the raga. While singing, he identified himself with the spirit of the composition. He was one of those musicians who could invest their music with emotional appeal."

— The Hindu, Musiri Subramania Iyer for Bhava

In the All India Radio archives catalog, this introduction was written: "Vocalist of mesmerizing melodies Musiri Subramania Iyer, was the repository of pathos, piety and poignancy. He was more at home in the pristine heights of upper octave than at any other. The enlightened and the lay had always rushed to the concert hall to hear the soulful melody of Musiri Subramania Iyer which had become the subject to talk in innumerable households. His audience got soaked in emotions and feelings that were at once human and divine."

Musiri Subramania Iyer was not only a respected musician but also a sought-after teacher. In fact his shishya parampara is so well recognized, his style of rendering krithis has come to be known as the Musiri School. His disciples include M S Subbulakshmi, N. Rajam, Musiri M.R.Gopala Rathnam, T. K. Govinda Rao, Bombay Sisters C. Saroja & C. Lalitha, Thylamba Krishnan, Mani Krishnaswamy, K. S. Venkataraman, Suguna Purushothaman and Suguna Varadachari. The Musiri Subramania Iyer Bani is carried out to the next generation by these Vidwans and Vidushis. Some of the students under Musiri Subramania Iyer Bani are Vocalists Kum K. Gayatri, Kum. Vidya Kalyanaraman, Sakuntala Narasimhan, Sri. Prasanna Venkatraman, Jayam Venkateshwaran and others.

== Awards ==
Before the Sangeetha Kalanidhi award existed, the highest honor possible in 1939 was to be invited as the President of the Annual Conference by the Madras Music Academy. Musiri Subramania Iyer was invited to be President of the Annual Conference that year, and was awarded the Sangeetha Kalanidhi by the Music Academy of Chennai as soon as the award came into being in 1942. Musiri Subramania Iyer was only 40 when he received it, a record that was bested by Semmangudi who received the award at the age of 39 in 1947. In 1963 he was awarded the Isai Perarignar from the Tamizh Isai Sangam. The Indian Fine Arts gave him the Sangita Kala Shikhamani in 1966. In 1967, he was made a Fellow of the Sangit Natak Academy. The President honored him with the Padma Bhushan in 1971. Roads have been named after him in Tamil Nadu, and national postage stamps were issued bearing his portrait in 1999.
