= Suguna Holdings =

Indian poultry company

Suguna Holdings Private Limited
- Type: Private
- Industry: Investment Management
- Founded: 2008
- Founder: B Soundararajan; G B Sundararajan
- Headquarters: Coimbatore, Tamil Nadu, India
- Area served: India
- Key people: B Soundararajan (Chairman); G B Sundararajan (MD)
- Products: Broiler Chicken, vaccines, Healthcare Product, Education
- Revenue: ₹5.2 billion (US$54 million) (2013–14)
- Number of employees: 5,500
- Website: www.sugunaholdings.com

Suguna Holdings Private Limited is an Indian multinational poultry group headquartered in Coimbatore, India. The company was started in 2008 and its involved in broiler farming, vaccines, healthcare products, feeds and educational institute for poultry. It markets and exports broiler chicken, vaccines for poultry, and healthcare products for animals. It is the largest poultry group in India.
