= Frank Dauwen =

Belgian footballer and coach

Personal information
- Date of birth: 3 November 1967 (age 58)
- Place of birth: Geel, Belgium
- Height: 1.98 m (6 ft 6 in)
- Position: Midfielder

Senior career*
Years	Team	Apps	(Gls)
1985–1990	Lierse	131	(5)
1990–2000	Gent	219	(21)
2000–2003	Westerlo	75	(2)

International career
1991–1992	Belgium	5	(0)

Managerial career
- 2008–2009: Westerlo (assistant)
- 2012–2013: Westerlo
- 2013–2015: Al Ahli (youth)
- 2018–2022: K Beerschot (assistant)
- 2022–2024: Kerala Blasters (assistant)
- * Club domestic league appearances and goals

Frank Dauwen (born 3 November 1967) is a Belgian professional football coach and former player, who was worked as the assistant coach of Indian Super League club Kerala Blasters.

== Playing career ==
Douwen, who played as a midfielder has made five appearances for the Belgium national team. He had a club career from 1985–2003 during which he won the Belgian Cup once. At the club level, he has played around in 340 matches.

== Managerial career ==
Dauwen has served as assistant coach for various clubs in Belgium and Saudi Arabia. He served as the head coach of a club for the first time in 2012, when he was appointed as the head coach of Belgian side K.V.C. Westerlo. He remained at the club until 2013.

=== Kerala Blasters ===
In 2022, he was appointed as the assistant to Ivan Vukomanović at the Indian Super League club Kerala Blasters FC. In April 2023, when Vukomanovic was banned for 10 matches, Dauwen was chosen to head coach the team for the 2023 Indian Super Cup, in the absence of Vukomanovic. Under Dauwen, the Blasters won their first game in the 2023 Hero Super Cup against Roundglass Punjab with a score of 3–1 on 8 April 2023. On 19 May, the Blasters announced a two-year contract extension for Dauwen till 2025 after he led the club in the previous season's Super Cup.
