= Suguna Varadachari =

Indian Carnatic vocalist

- Born: 20 December 1945 (age 80); Dharapuram, Tamil Nadu, British India
- Occupations: Singer, music teacher
- Awards: Sangeet Natak Akademi Award; Sangita Kala Acharya
- Musical career
- Genres: Carnatic music
- Instruments: Vocals, Veena

Suguna Varadachari is a Carnatic vocalist and Carnatic music teacher from Tamil Nadu, India. She is also a Veena artist. She received several awards including Sangeet Natak Akademi Award and Sangita Kala Acharya Award by Madras Music Academy.

== Life and career ==
Suguna Varadachari was born on 20 December 1945, in Dharapuram in present-day Thirupur district of Tamil Nadu. She first studied Carnatic music under P.K. Rajagopala Iyer. Suguna passed Sangita Vidwan course at the Central College of Carnatic Music, Chennai, and later received advanced training from Musiri Subramania Iyer with the Government of India Cultural Scholarship, in 1967.

Suguna, an A-Top artist in All India Radio, Chennai, who has performed in many programs of AIR and was a Carnatic music teacher in the series Isai Payirchi, has also sung in many recordings for the AIR Archives. She has participated in numerous national and international seminars and presented numerous lectures on music. Her notable recordings include Melodies of Musiri, Adarsha, Sri Venkatesha and Compositions of Dandapani Desikar.

From 1984 to 2004, Suguna worked as faculty at University of Madras. She held several other positions including board member of the Central University of Performing Arts, Chennai and expert committee member of the Madras Music Academy, Chennai. In 2011, she was awarded the title Sangeet Kala Acharya. Her disciples include V. Bharath Kumar, Brindha Manickavasakan, Aishwarya Shankar, Vidya Kalyanaraman, and Aravind Sundar (Chicago).

== Personal life ==
She lives in Raja Annamalaipuram in Chennai.She has two sons and her grandson is a Carnatic vocal singer

== Awards and honors ==
- Sangeet Natak Akademi Award 2015
- Kalajyoti by Suswaraa 2007
- Acharya Ratnakara Award 2011 at the Cleveland Tyagaraja Festival
- Sangita Kala Acharya Award 2011 by Music Academy, Chennai
- Sangeet Pracharya Award 2014 by Shanmukhananda Fine Arts, Mumbai
