= Suguna Foods =

India-based food company

Suguna Foods Private Limited
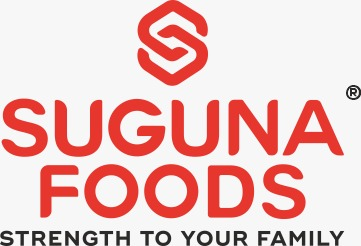
- Type: Private
- Industry: Poultry
- Founded: 1984
- Founder: B Soundararajan; G B Sundararajan
- Headquarters: Coimbatore, Tamil Nadu, India
- Area served: India
- Key people: B.Soundararajan (Chairman), G.B.Sundararajan (Director), S.Vignesh Soundararajan (MD)
- Products: Chicken meat, Delfrez Eggs, Delfrez, Suguna Feeds, Mother's Delight,
- Brands: Suguna Chicken; Suguna Feeds; Delfrez; Mother's Delight; MICROZE
- Number of employees: 8000+
- Website: www.sugunafoods.com

Suguna Foods Private Limited is an Indian agribusiness company headquartered in Coimbatore, Tamil Nadu. Established in 1984 by B. Soundararajan and G. B. Sundararajan, the company operates an integrated poultry business involving breeding, hatcheries, feed production, contract farming and poultry processing.

== History ==
=== Origin ===
Suguna Foods was established in 1984 by brothers B. Soundararajan and G.B. Sundararajan in Tamil Nadu. The company initially operated in poultry farming and trading before expanding into an integrated poultry production model. During the 1980s, poultry farming in India was largely fragmented, with farmers independently sourcing chicks, feed, veterinary services and other inputs. Suguna developed a contract farming model under which the company provided inputs such as chicks, feed and technical support, while participating farmers provided the infrastructure and labour required for rearing the birds. The contract farming model was subsequently expanded to other parts of India. The company developed operations covering breeding and hatcheries, feed manufacturing, contract farming and poultry processing.

== Expansion ==
During the 1990s and 2000s, Suguna expanded its poultry infrastructure and farmer network across India. The company subsequently diversified into related areas of agribusiness, including feed production, poultry processing, animal healthcare and retail. Suguna has also expanded its business activities outside India, including in Bangladesh, Sri Lanka and Kenya.

== Business operations ==
Suguna's operations cover several stages of the poultry production and distribution chain, including:

- Breeding and hatcheries, including the production of poultry breeding stock and day-old chicks.
- Feed manufacturing, producing feed for poultry and livestock.
- Contract farming, through which the company works with poultry farmers and provides production-related inputs and technical support.
- Poultry processing, including the processing and distribution of chicken products.
- Food and retail, through businesses operating in the fresh and processed food segments.
- Animal healthcare, including products related to poultry and livestock health.

Under its contract farming system, participating farmers receive production inputs and technical support from the company, while providing land, poultry sheds and labour for bird rearing. The birds are subsequently transferred to the company for sale or further processing.

== Brands ==
Suguna operates brands across poultry, animal nutrition and food products.

- Suguna Chicken is a poultry meat brand operated by the company.
- Suguna Feeds operates in the animal-feed segment, producing feed for poultry and livestock.
- Delfrez is a retail food brand offering fresh and processed meat products.
- Mother's Delight is associated with the company's soya-processing and edible-oil business.
- Microze operates in the animal healthcare segment, with products including veterinary pharmaceuticals, feed additives and nutritional products.

Suguna has presence in Bangladesh, Kenya and Sri Lanka.

== Awards and recognition ==
Suguna Foods and members of its leadership have received recognition from industry and business organisations. In 2022, Vignesh Soundararajan, Managing Director of Suguna Foods, received the Hurun Industry Achievement Award.
